= Fougères =

Fougères Foujerr (Gallo) Felger (Breton)
- Subprefecture and commune
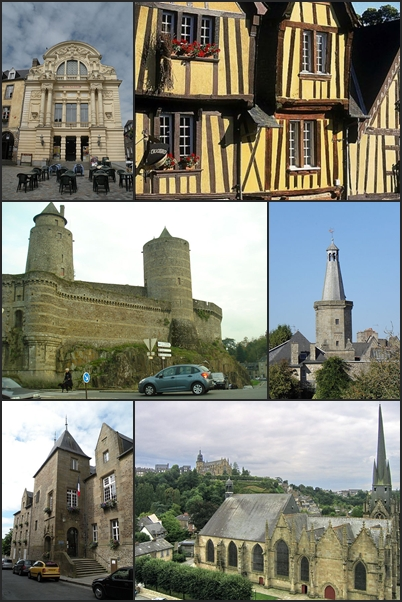
- From left to right and top to bottom: 1. Victor Hugo Theatre, 2. Timbered house, 3. The château, 4. The belfry, 5. The Hôtel de Ville, 6. The Church of St. Sulpice

- Flag Coat of arms
- Location of Fougères
- Location within France Location within Brittany
- Coordinates: 48°21′09″N 1°11′55″W
- Country: France
- Region: Brittany
- Department: Ille-et-Vilaine
- Arrondissement: Fougères-Vitré
- Canton: Fougères-1 and 2
- Intercommunality: Fougères Agglomération

Government
  - Mayor (2020–2026): Louis Feuvrier (DVG)
- Area^{1}: 10.46 km^{2} (4.04 sq mi)
- Elevation: 97 m (318 ft)
- Highest elevation: 171 m (561 ft)
- Lowest elevation: 62 m (203 ft)
- Population (2023): 20,307
  - Density: 1,941/km^{2} (5,028/sq mi)
- Time zone: UTC+01:00 (CET)
  - Summer (DST): UTC+02:00 (CEST)
- INSEE/Postal code: 35115 /35300
- ^{1} French Land Register data, which excludes lakes, ponds, glaciers > 1 km^{2} (0.386 sq mi or 247 acres) and river estuaries.

Fougères (French: [fuʒɛʁ]; Breton: Felger; Gallo: Foujerr) is a commune and a sub-prefecture of the Ille-et-Vilaine department, located in Brittany, northwestern France. As of 2023, Fougères had 20,307 inhabitants. The Fougères area comprises approximately 88,000 inhabitants and is currently growing, unlike the town centre.

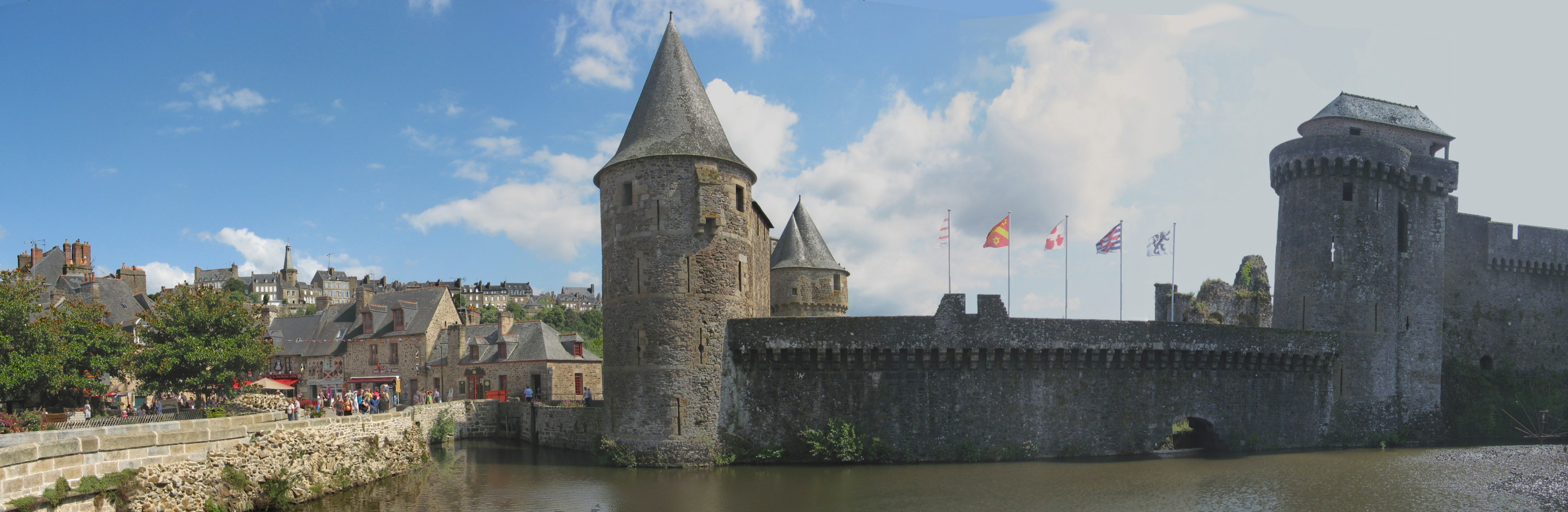
Panorama of the castle of Fougères seen from Raoul-II Square

== History ==
=== Toponymy ===
Fougères is a town on the edge of Brittany, Maine and Normandy and is named after the french term for a fern (see also fougère), or from fous which means fossé ("gap").

The town of Fougères is mentioned in the chorus of the song La Blanche Hermine by Gilles Servat. The author uses it as a symbol of the Breton resistance where it is adjacent to the town of Clisson in the Loire-Atlantique.

Fougères is historically, since the arrival of Latin in Armorica, a region where Gallo is spoken. In Gallo, Fougères translates to Foujerr while its Breton name is Felger. Entry signs to the agglomeration have carried the Breton name for several years. One of the two bagad of the city takes this name: Bagad Bro Felger and the Diwan school, opened in 2013, is also called Skol Diwan bro Felger.

=== Prehistory ===
The presence of many megalithic monuments, particularly in the Forest of Fougères, suggests that the area was already inhabited in the Neolithic era (5000 to 2000 years BC).

=== Middle Ages ===
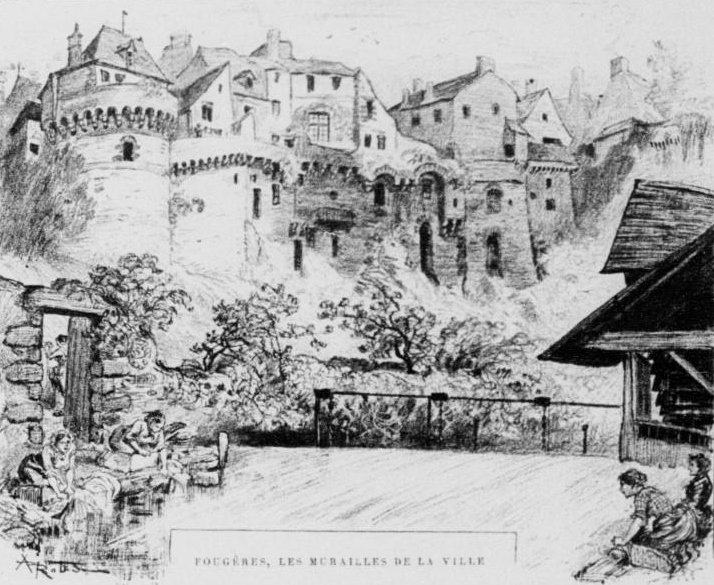
Fougères: The walls of the city (lithography by Albert Robida, 1900)

The creation of Fougères dates back to the Middle Ages. The Château de Fougères was first mentioned around the end of the 10th century. At the time, it was a simple wooden fortification located on a rocky ridge, whose position favourably dominated the Nançon Valley and the surrounding marshes. Fougères was at the crossing of two Roman roads, one from Chartres to Carhaix and the other from Avranches to Nantes. From the 12th century, the population moved away from the shore of the Nançon and the city grew in size, divided into two parishes: Saint-Sulpice for the lower town and Saint-Léonard for the upper town. Since the Middle Ages, crafts developed around tannery, weavers and drapers in the lower town.

Built in the 11th century by the lords of Fougères, the first fortification, defended by Raoul II (1130–1194), was taken by Henry II of England in 1166 and destroyed. Raoul II stubbornly rebuilt a more imposing structure and it became a stronghold defending the borders of Brittany from Mont Saint-Michel to Nantes. However, the geographical position and the interests of the lords of Fougères often tipped in favour of the Kingdom of France. When Raoul III offered its possession to Louis IX of France, the Breton prince Pierre Mauclerc captured the city in 1231, which was re-captured by the king. The daughter of Raoul III, Jeanne de Fougères, who married Hugh XII of Lusignan, undertook new fortification work and beautified the city. The end of the 13th century was a period of peace and prosperity for Fougères.

In 1307, Philip IV of France bought the domain but the Kingdom of France was not interested and did not maintain it. After various fights and reversals of alliances, Bertrand du Guesclin entered in 1373, but the situation did not improve. Abandoned and ravaged by pillaging, the population of Fougères requested assistance from the Duchy of Brittany and the town joined the duchy in 1428, sold by John II of Alençon. However, in 1449, a man named François de Surienne, an Aragonese mercenary at the service of the English, captured and sacked the town in an attempt to force Brittany to ally with England. There were many massacres, which caused a reaction from Francis I, Duke of Brittany, determined to get rid of the English. The Duke of Brittany allied with Charles VII of France and attacked the south of Normandy, laying siege to Fougères. Surienne and his men were, however, able to resist and surrendered on the condition of being able to walk free. This episode announced the Battle of Formigny. Finally, the French general La Trémoille seized Fougères in 1488, during the Mad War.

=== Early modern ===
In the 16th century, the town lost its defensive role. Crafts continued to develop, including the craft of tin (in Rue de la Pinterie). During the Wars of Religion, the town remained Catholic while Vitré was affected by clashes with the Huguenots.

Until 1775, Fougères was barely mentioned. The Marquis de La Rouërie, a young man of high standing, then moved to the United States to fight with American insurgents. Back in France, after having been imprisoned for a month for leading the Breton conspiracy, he was greeted as a hero in his homeland.

=== French Revolution ===
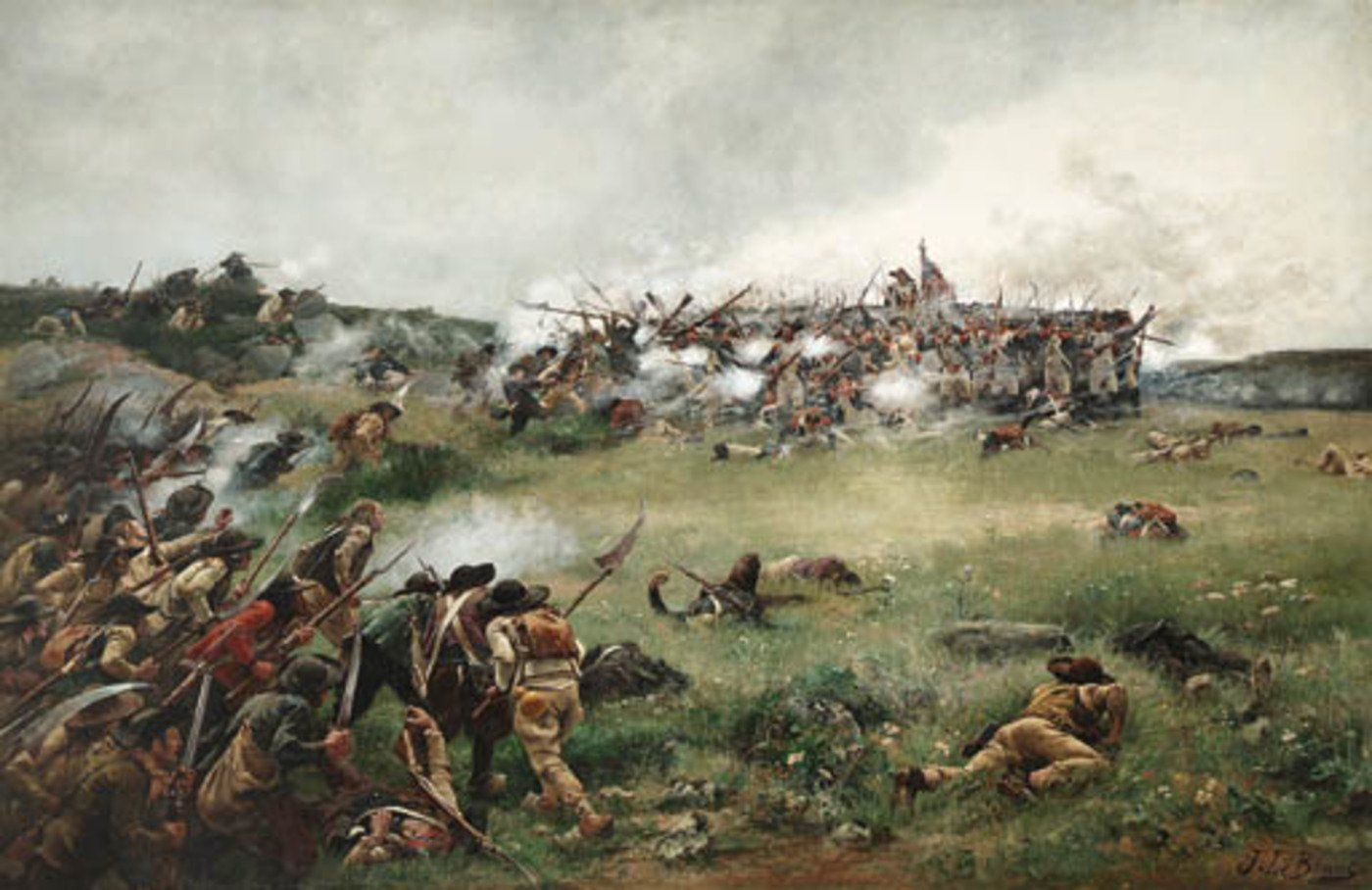
The battalion square - Affair of Fougères, 1793, oil on canvas by Julien Le Blant, 1880. Brigham Young University, University of Provo, Utah

During the French Revolution, the province of Brittany disappeared along with its privileges. The first changes were originally welcomed by the population. However, over time the Civil Constitution of the Clergy of the priests and the Levée en masse triggered a rebellion, the Chouannerie. In 1793, during the Virée de Galerne, the Vendéens and Chouans seized the town which was taken a few weeks later by the Republicans. For eight years, the town and its region passed from hand to hand, with many massacres and looting occurring. The leader of the Chouans of the Fougères area was the young general Aimé du Boisguy.

The Organization of the Revolutionary Celebrations reflected a favourable feeling from the population to the new regime:

- The victories of the Republican armies were celebrated, including the Siege of Toulon against the Anglo-royalists
- The feast of 26 messidor (14 July), established in 1794, was celebrated in Fougères
- The anniversary of the execution of Louis XVI, accompanied by an oath of hatred to royalty and anarchy, was celebrated (from 1795)
- Other Republican festivals followed, such as the anniversary of the Republic up to the year VIII (22 September, 1 Vendémiaire), the celebration of youth (10 Germinal, on 30 March), and the Festival of Recognition (the 10 prairial) or the Festival of Agriculture (the 10 messidor).

=== 20th century ===
==== Early 20th century industry ====
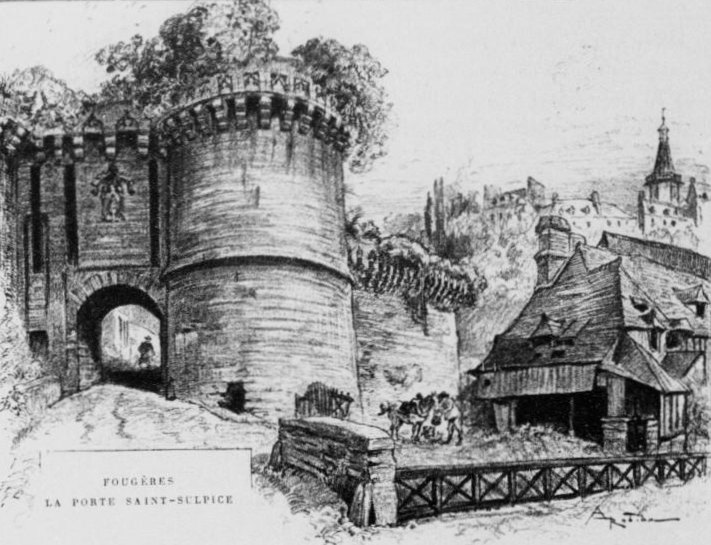
Fougères: The Saint-Sulpice Gate (lithography by Albert Robida, 1900)

Little by little, industry replaced crafts and Fougères saw the establishment of shoe manufacturers. In the winter of 1906–07, workers went on strike in the shoe factories and in response, managers organised a lockout. Solidarity was very strong in the city ("Communist" soups to feed the strikers without family income) but also beyond: Children were welcomed by Rennes and Parisian families during conflicts. Jean Jaurès came to Fougères to support the movement.

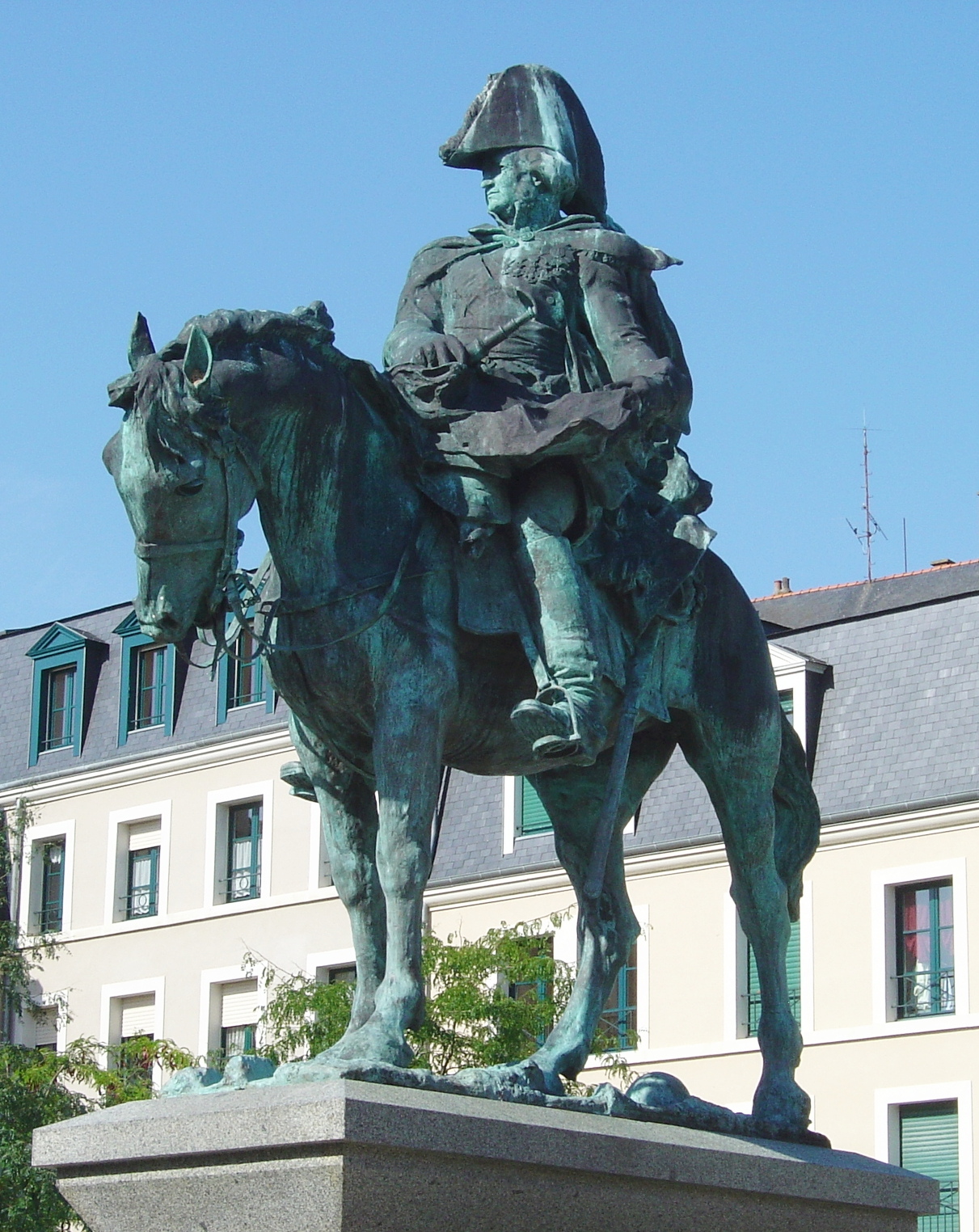
Statue of the general Jean Ambroise Baston de Lariboisière

Glassware production had also existed in the Fougères area since the arrival of Italian glass masters in the 16th and 17th centuries. The installation of this industry is explained by the presence of a sandy soil (since sand is the main component of glass), a forest (since sand needs to be melted) and ferns (soda-rich plants). A glass factory existed on the outskirts of the town (Laignelet), which flourished in the 19th century. However, following social demands in 1921, religious unionism was mobilized and a new Fougères glass factory: La Cristallerie Fougeraise, was founded by Abbot Bridel, as well as a working town later in 1922, designed by the architect Hyacinthe Perrin, to accommodate staff.

The 20th century was marked by the British and American bombings on 8 June 1944, during Operation Overlord, which killed 300 people, injured twice as many, and destroyed most of the public and industrial facilities. This bombing was in preparation to liberate France after surrendering to Nazi Germany on June 22 1940. Since then, the town has largely been open to tourism, thanks to its medieval castle and its historic districts. From the 1970s, industry has been diverse: food processing, furniture, mechanical, glass, electronics, computing, and robotics.

Fougères also organizes an important cattle market.

==== World War I ====
640 names are engraved in a monument to commemorate the death of soldiers from Fougères that fought for France during World War I. Fougères also welcomed many war wounded soldiers in its hospital and the monument mention 148 additional names of soldiers that died in Fougères but were not originating from the city.

=== Recent sports events ===
On 11 July 2013, Fougères hosted the Tour de France as a departure town. When the Tour de France returned on 10 July 2015, Fougères was the finish town for stage 7 (Livarot-Fougères). It was a stage victory for the British cyclist Mark Cavendish. Cycling came back to the town on 4 July 2016, where Fougères was a race-through town in the stage Granville-Angers.

Fougères is also one of the control points for the Paris–Brest–Paris (PBP) bicycle event. PBP is an ultra-marathon event where cyclists are expected to complete the 1,200 km (746 miles) course in under 90 hours, and occurs the year before a Summer Olympic year. Fougères is a control point both out bound to Brest as well as back to Paris.

== Emblems ==
=== Heraldry ===
Arms of Fougères	The arms of Fougères are blazoned : Or to the fern plant three parts of vert, pulled away from sable, chief welded argent charged with three sable ermine spots. The town of Fougeres as from 11 November 1948, holder of the Croix de guerre 1939–45, this decoration accompanies since the figuration of its weapons.

== Pays de Fougères ==
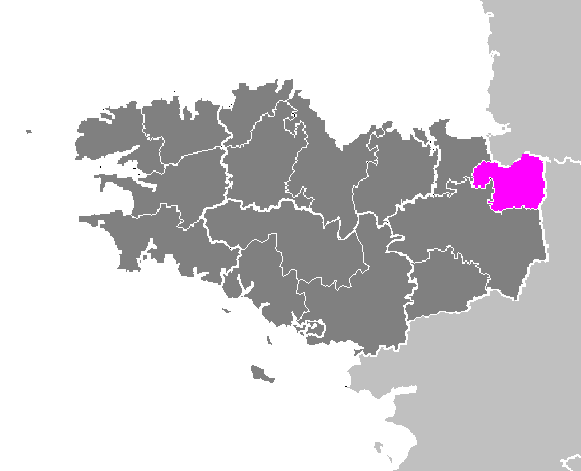
Pays de Fougères

Located northeast of Ille-et-Vilaine, the Pays de Fougères has 83,000 inhabitants. This population continues to grow and represents 11.77% of the population of the Department covering 977,449 inhabitants and seven Pays. The Pays is composed of 58 communes, divided into five communities:

- Community of communes of the canton of Antrain
- Community of communes of Coglais
- Fougères community
- Louvigné community
- Community of communes of the Pays de Saint-Aubin-du-Cormier

== Heritage ==
Fougères is classified as a town of art and history since 1985. It houses 24 historical monuments and 87 buildings surveyed.

Fougères has the label tourisme et handicap, since July 2011.

=== Castle ===
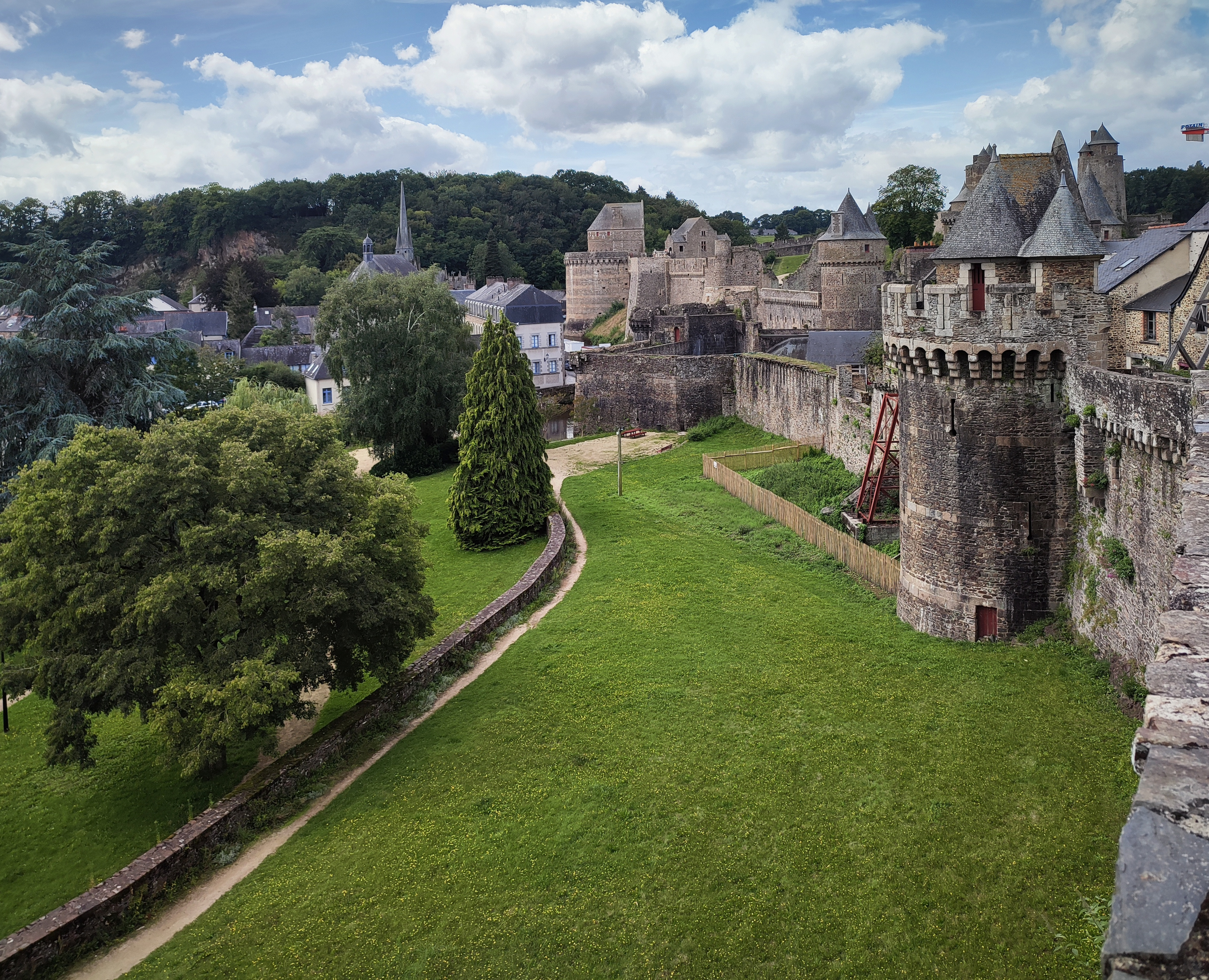
Château de Fougères

Fougères' most visited attraction is the Château de Fougères, a medieval stronghold built atop a granite ledge, which was part of the Duchy of Brittany's ultimately unsuccessful defence against French aggression, and part of a tripartite with Vitré.

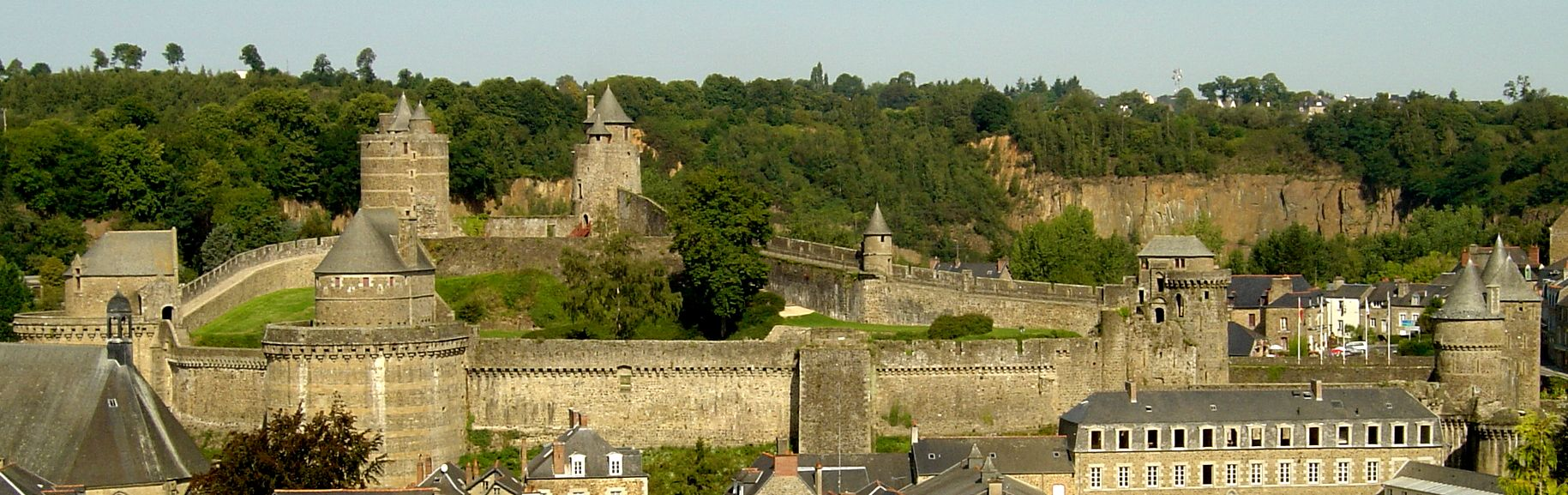
A general view of the château

The castle is one of the most impressive French castles, occupying an area of 2 hectares (4.9 acres), or even for some "the largest medieval fortress of Europe." It consists of three enclosures whose walls have been preserved. Although the seigniorial is ruined, the thirteen towers still rise with majesty. Some of these towers can be visited (the Hallay Tower and Tower of the Hague (12th century), Raoul Tower (15th century) and the Mélusine Tower, erected in 1242 by Hugues of Lusignan). At the entrance, is a triple watermill. Access to the west curtain wall allows observation of the upper town (48°21′13″N 1°12′34″W).

The castle and its surroundings has been classified as a historic monument by list of 1862, by order of 4 July 1928 and by order of 26 February 1953.

A postage stamp representing the castle was issued on 18 January 1960.

=== The belfry ===
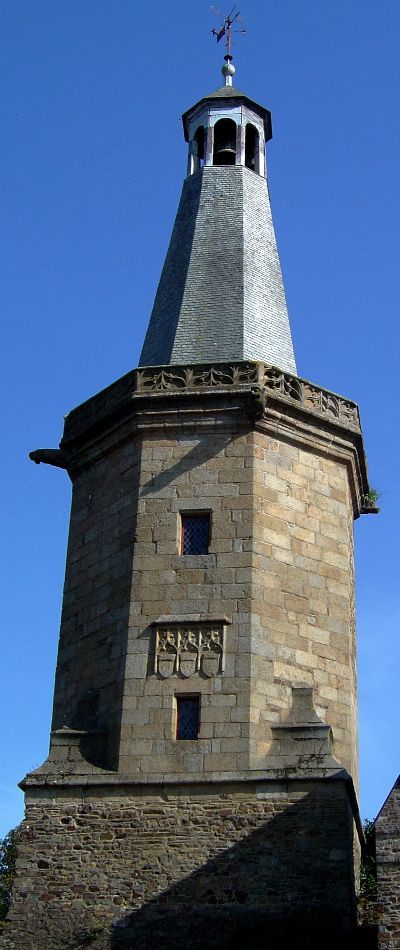
The belfry

This was the first to be built in Brittany, in 1397, and also one of only three belfries in Brittany. The location serves as the centre of the weekend market. It symbolised the dynamism of a small-scale civil society seeking independence. Funded by local merchants, it allowed ordinary people access to timekeeping, previously the preserve of the church and nobility. Its architecture was inspired by the Flemish models which the drapers of Fougères discovered during their travels in Flanders. Engraved on the Bell is the inscription: In 1397 the market town of Fougères made me and my name is Roland Chapelle.

The belfry was classified as a historical monument by Decree of 1 September 1922.

=== The Notre-Dame Gate ===
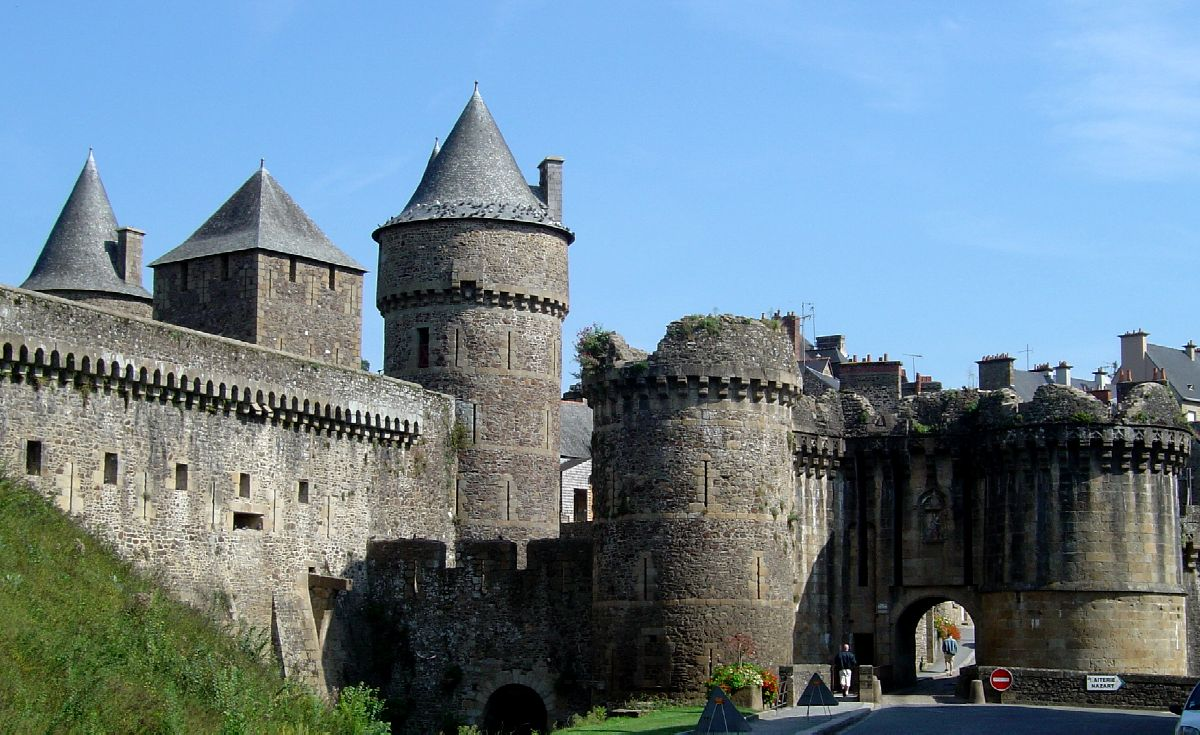
The Notre-Dame Gate, to the west of the town

A sizable section of the town wall survives, stretching from the château in the lower town, up the hill to surround the upper town. Medieval citizens in the lower town were outside the fortifications and had to retreat into the fortress in times of trouble. The gate of the 15th century with a double drawbridge presents many defenses including moats, embrasures, machicolations, etc., and a protective Virgin turned outwards. It is the only fortified town gate which is left.

The Notre-Dame Gate was listed a historical monument by Decree of 9 December 1946, with the south and west of the city walls.

=== The Saint-Sulpice Church ===
The Church of Saint-Sulpice dates in part from the 15th century. It was classified as a historical monument by Decree of 26 September 1910. There are two remarkable medieval altarpieces of monumental granite with carved decoration: The altarpiece of the Tanners and the altarpiece of Notre-Dame-des-Marais.

=== The Church of Saint-Léonard ===
The Church of Saint-Léonard also dates from the 15th century. It was listed a historical monument by Decree of 15 March 1949. Located at the top of the upper town, it offers a panoramic view of the city.

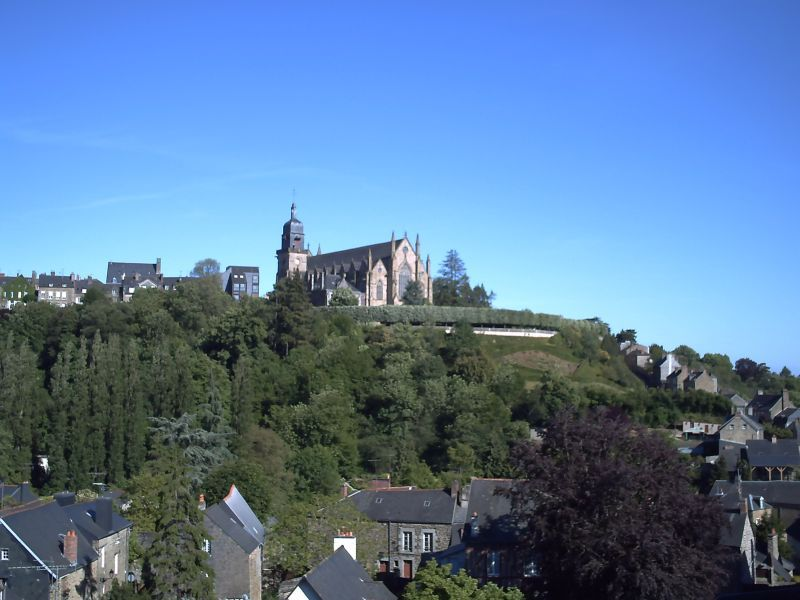
The Church of Saint-Léonard at Fougères

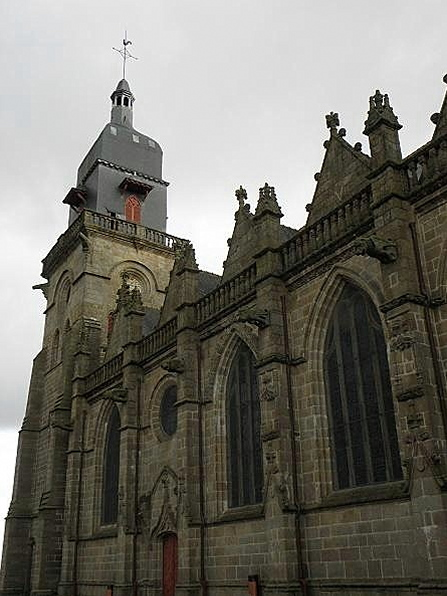
The Church of Saint-Léonard, north side

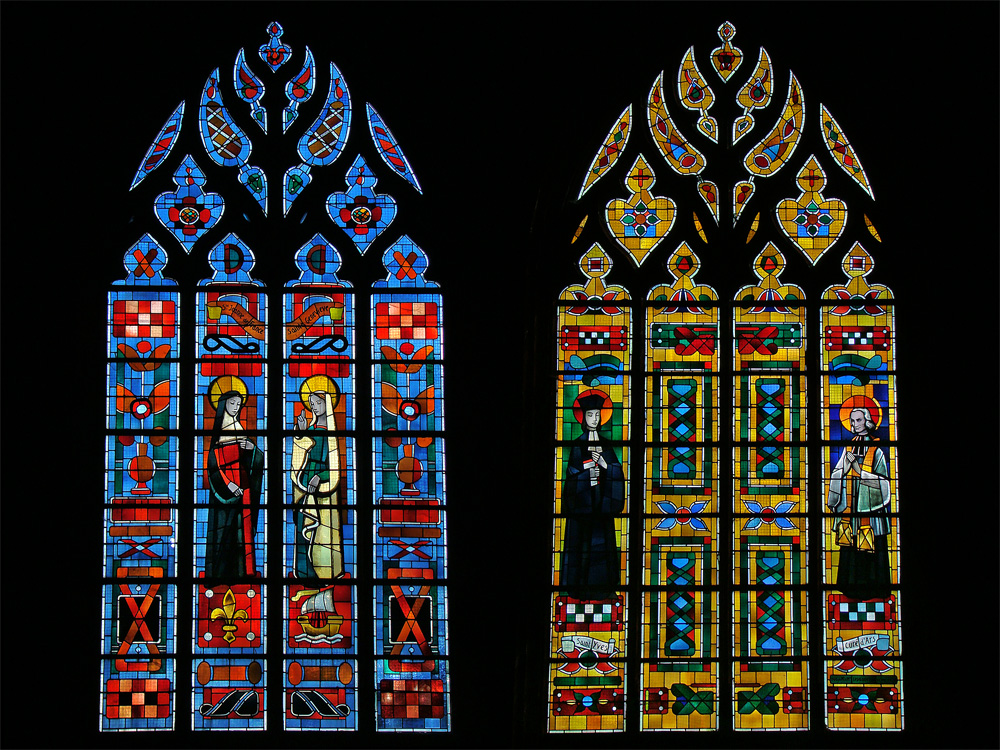
Stained-glass windows of the Church of Saint-Léonard

=== Religious and civil heritage ===
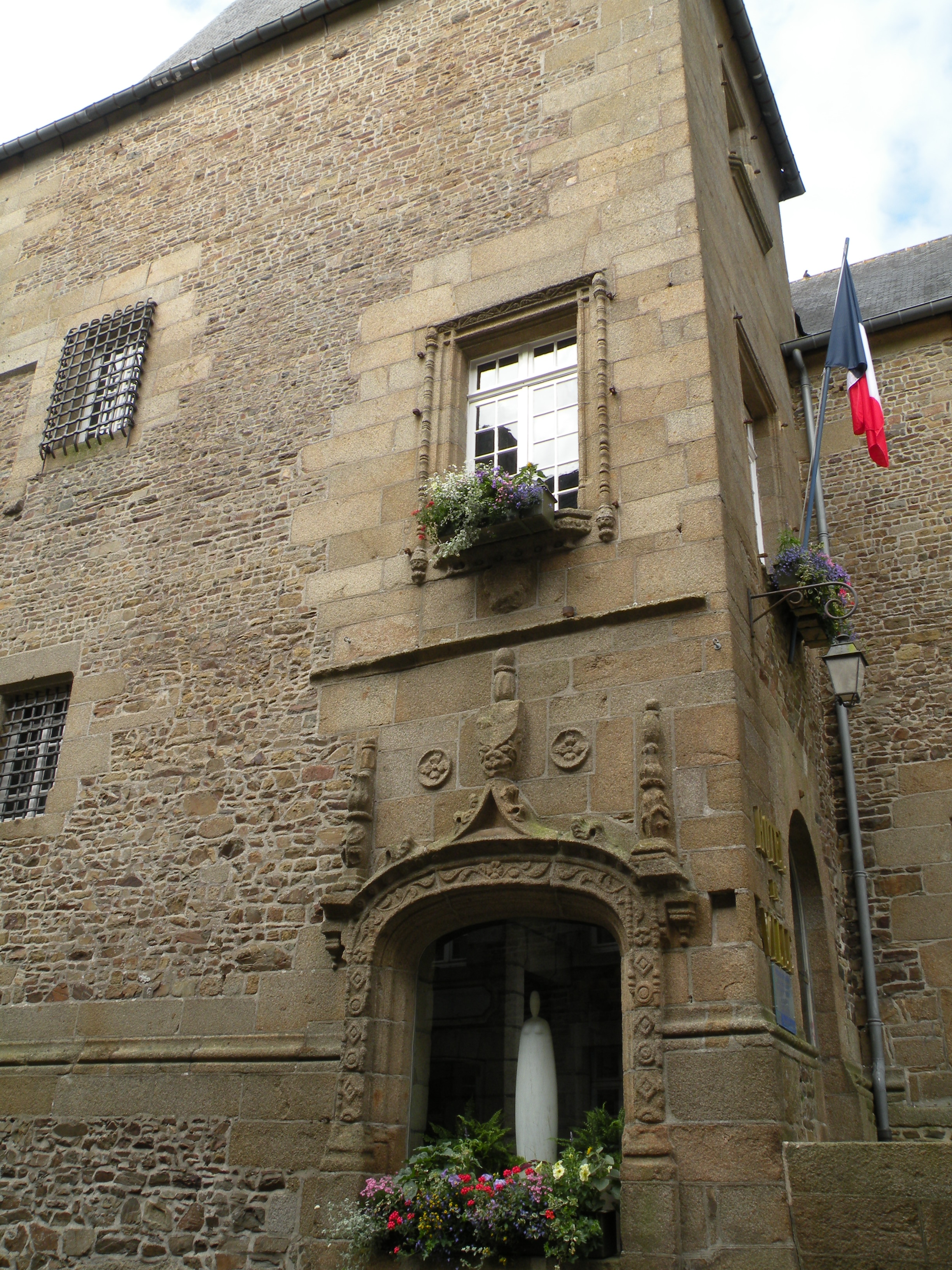
Façade of the Hôtel de Ville

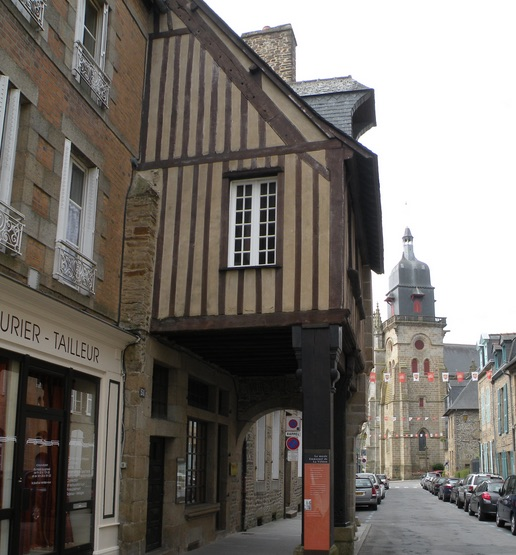
The museum of Emmanuel-de-la-Villéon

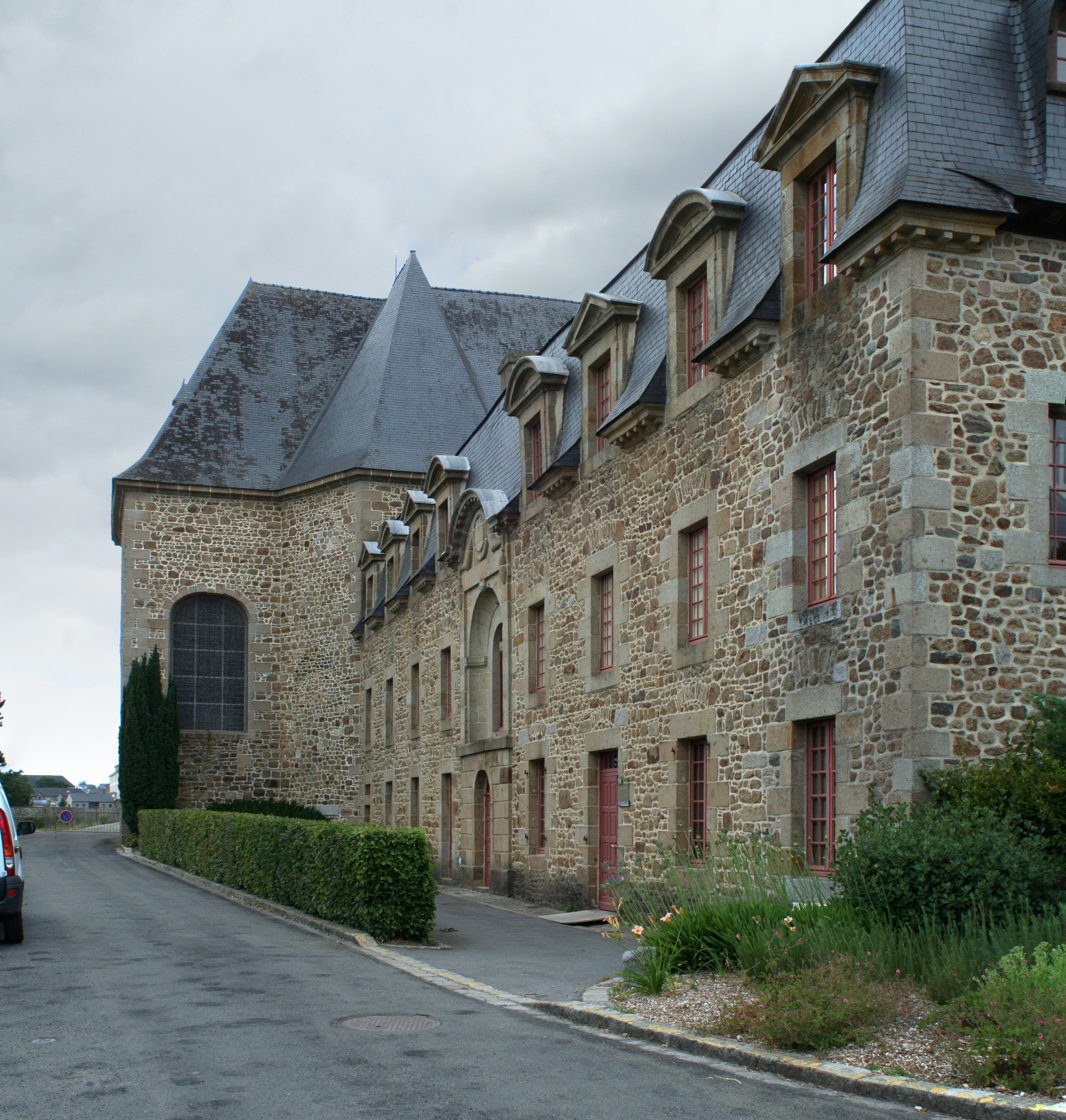
The convent of the Clarisses Urbanists

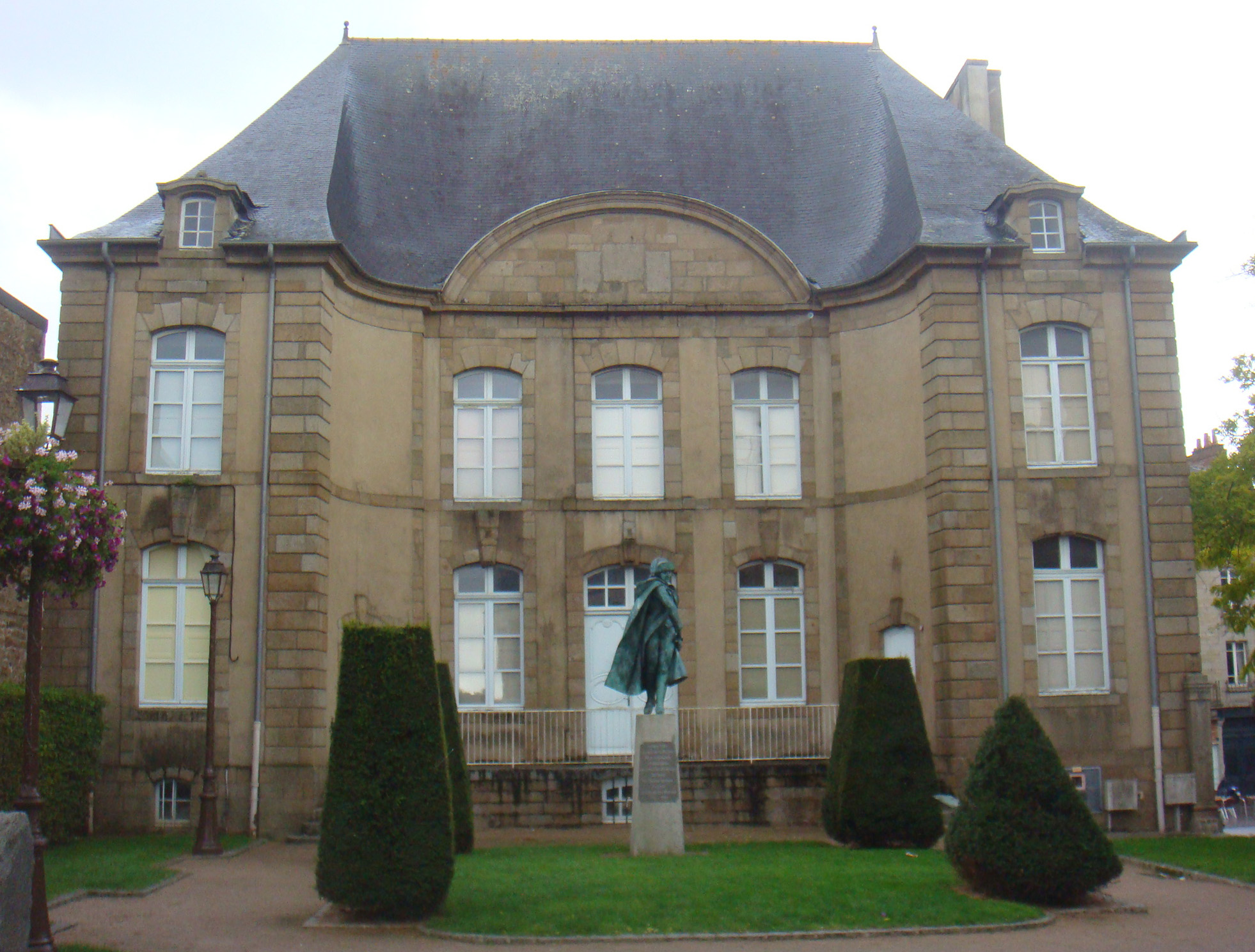
Belinaye Hotel

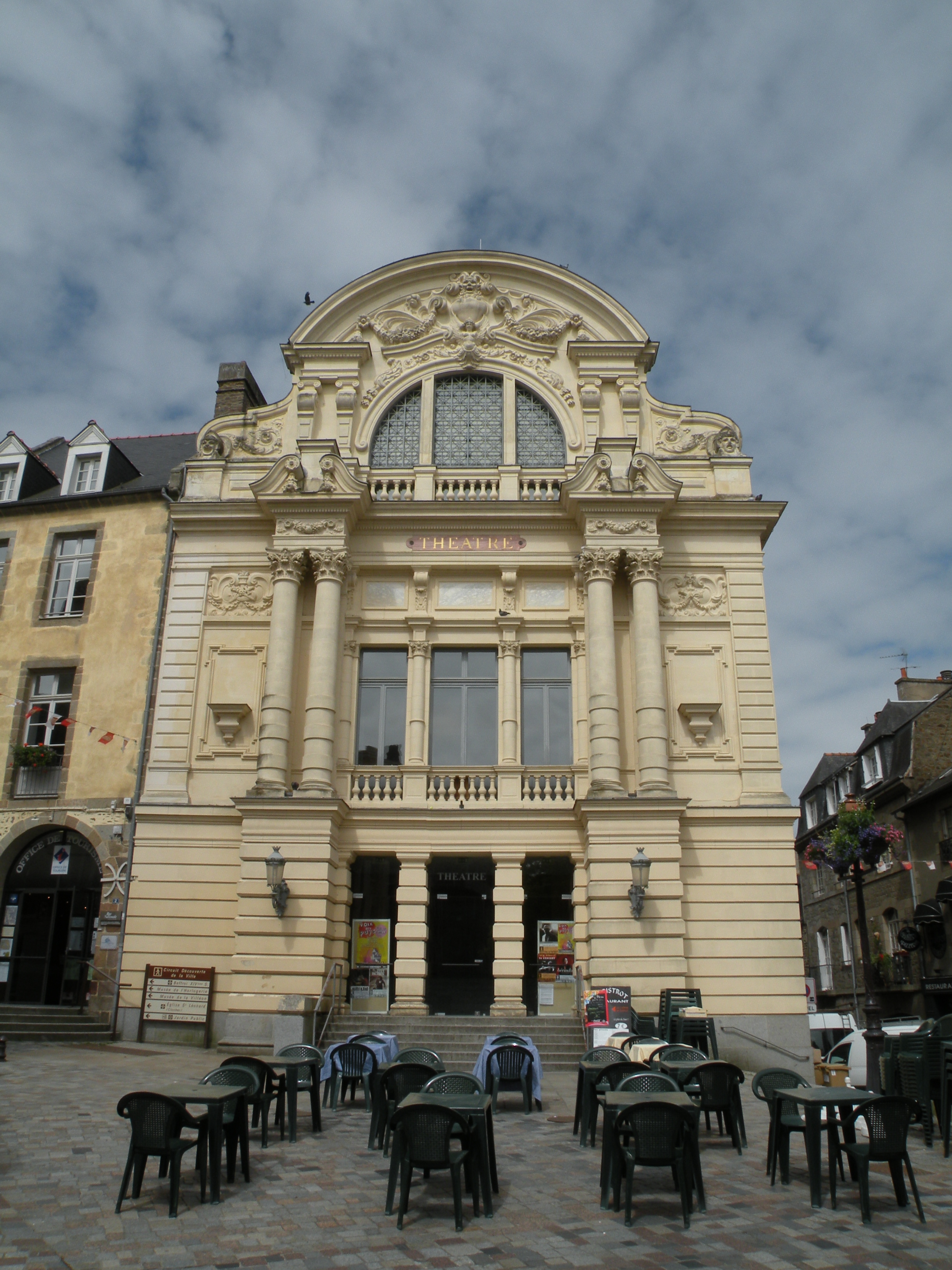
Façade of the municipal theatre
- One part of the medieval fortifications, when the town was one of the strongest places on the Normandy frontier, is a 15th-century gateway known as the Porte St Sulpice.
- The Hôtel de Ville was completed in 1535. It was listed as a monument historique by order of 14 October 1926.
- The Emmanuel-de-la-Villéon Museum; house porch built in the 16th century near the Saint-Léonard Church. It has been listed by order of 13 May 1929.
- The former Convent of the Clarisses planners, built in 1680 and partly destroyed by fire in 1794, now houses a cultural centre after being used as a prison and then as barracks. Scored by order of 15 July 1965.
- The Hôtel de la Belinaye, built in 1740, is the birthplace of the marquis Armand Tuffin de La Rouërie. It now houses the city court. Its front garden was listed by order of 3 February 1928.
- The Victor-Hugo theatre, one of the last Italian theatres, built in 1888 by Jean-Marie Laloy, listed by order of 1 June 1988; its façade was ranked by order of 1 March 1990.

The Tower of Papegaud, place where the plot of the novel Les Chouans by de Balzac unravels.

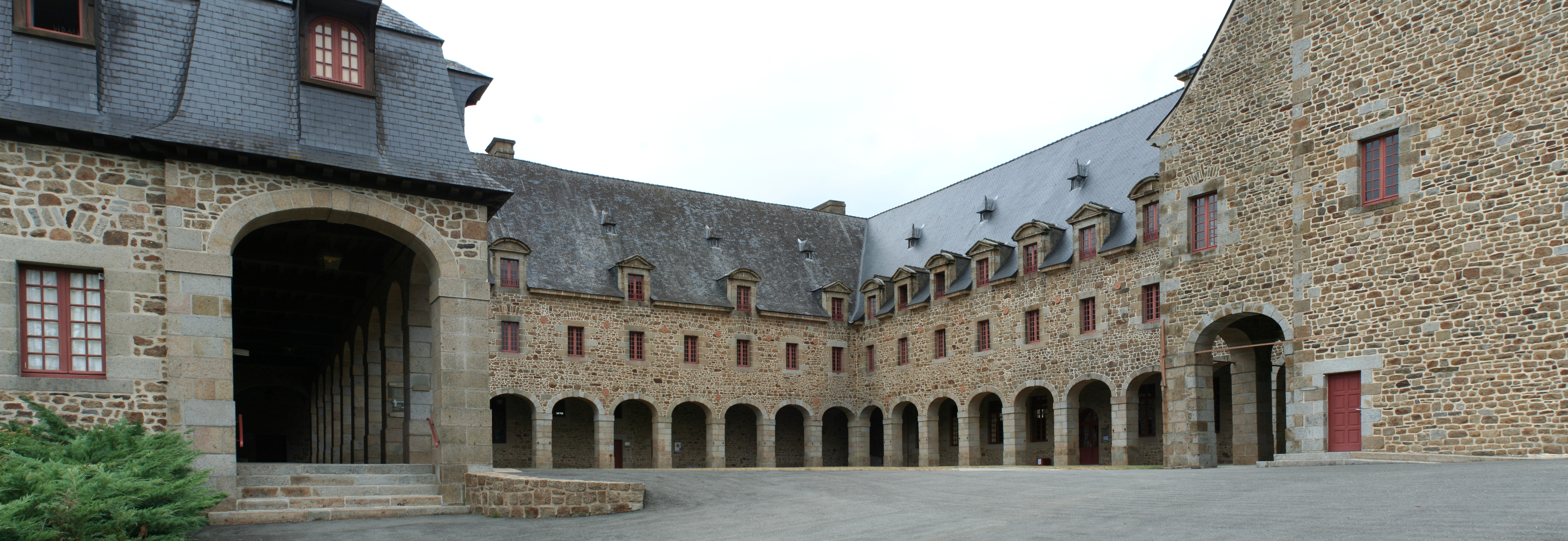
Convent of the clarisses urbanists of Fougères

- Abbey of Saint-Pierre de Rillé. Originally a collegiate church of Augustinian regular canons. It was founded in 1143 and in the seventeenth century became the Abbey of Sainte-Geneviève. It was rebuilt once between 1724 and 1750, and again in the 19th century. Of the former building, visible in its entirety on the 1756 plan, it remains the only stair tower topped by an imperial roof.
- Crystal glass factory built in 1922 by architect Hyacinthe Perrin, restored, now houses administrative buildings.
- Church Notre-Dame-de-Bonabry of Fougères
- Saint-Brice hotel
- Hotel Marigny

== Geography ==
=== Geology ===
Fougères is situated in the Cadomian chain. The oldest buildings use readily available stone: la cornéenne. A metamorphic rock, difficult to cut and of very different appearance, it is very solid. Later came the use of Louvigné granite, which is more homogeneous. Most of the buildings of the town are built with these local materials. It took the arrival of the railway to import other stones (late 19th century). In military strategy, note that the castle is not on high, but on a deposit of la cornéenne, which prevents the risk of attacks by mining and from underground.

=== Location ===
Fougères is situated:

- 330 kilometres (210 mi) from Paris
- 40 kilometres (25 mi) from Rennes
- 58 kilometres (36 mi) from Mont-Saint-Michel
- 81 kilometres (50 mi) from Saint-Malo
- 290 kilometres (180 mi) from Brest
- 140 kilometres (87 mi) from Nantes
- 149 kilometres (93 mi) from Caen
- 130 kilometres (81 mi) from Angers
- 54 kilometres (34 mi) from Laval
- 52 kilometres (32 mi) from Avranches
- 111 kilometres (69 mi) from Alençon

== Climate ==
Climate data for Fougères (1991–2014 normals, extremes 1966–present)
Month	Jan	Feb	Mar	Apr	May	Jun	Jul	Aug	Sep	Oct	Nov	Dec	Year
Record high °C (°F)	15.6 (60.1)	19.4 (66.9)	23.0 (73.4)	26.7 (80.1)	30.5 (86.9)	41.3 (106.3)	39.1 (102.4)	37.2 (99.0)	33.7 (92.7)	29.4 (84.9)	19.8 (67.6)	17.5 (63.5)	41.3 (106.3)
Mean daily maximum °C (°F)	8.1 (46.6)	9.1 (48.4)	12.3 (54.1)	14.9 (58.8)	18.3 (64.9)	21.3 (70.3)	23.3 (73.9)	23.4 (74.1)	20.6 (69.1)	16.3 (61.3)	11.4 (52.5)	8.3 (46.9)	15.6 (60.1)
Daily mean °C (°F)	5.7 (42.3)	6.1 (43.0)	8.5 (47.3)	10.6 (51.1)	14.0 (57.2)	16.9 (62.4)	18.6 (65.5)	18.6 (65.5)	16.2 (61.2)	12.9 (55.2)	8.6 (47.5)	5.8 (42.4)	11.9 (53.4)
Mean daily minimum °C (°F)	3.2 (37.8)	3.0 (37.4)	4.7 (40.5)	6.4 (43.5)	9.7 (49.5)	12.4 (54.3)	13.8 (56.8)	13.9 (57.0)	11.7 (53.1)	9.4 (48.9)	5.8 (42.4)	3.2 (37.8)	8.1 (46.6)
Record low °C (°F)	−15.2 (4.6)	−10.6 (12.9)	−6.8 (19.8)	−4.2 (24.4)	−1.0 (30.2)	3.0 (37.4)	6.2 (43.2)	3.9 (39.0)	2.7 (36.9)	−1.6 (29.1)	−5.7 (21.7)	−9.0 (15.8)	−15.2 (4.6)
Average precipitation mm (inches)	95.8 (3.77)	76.4 (3.01)	67.6 (2.66)	64.9 (2.56)	70.7 (2.78)	60.4 (2.38)	63.6 (2.50)	61.7 (2.43)	69.2 (2.72)	93.4 (3.68)	104.1 (4.10)	111.3 (4.38)	939.1 (36.97)
Average precipitation days (≥ 1.0 mm)	15.0	12.6	11.6	11.4	10.2	8.8	9.2	9.2	9.8	12.6	14.5	15.4	140.2
Source: Meteociel

== Politics and administration ==
=== List of mayors ===
List of mayors of Fougères
Start	End	Name	Party	Other details
2 March 1893	3 May 1902	Alfred Marie Pierre Victor Bazillon	Progressive Republicans	Member of Ille-et-Vilaine from 8 May 1898 to 31 May 1902
1945	March 1965	Hippolyte Réhault	MRP	Industrial - Senator (1946–48)
March 1965	March 1971	Jean Madelain	UDF	Senator (1980-1998); General councillor of the Canton of Fougères-Nord (1964–88)
March 1971	March 1983	Michel Cointat	RPR	Agronomist; MP (1967–93)
March 1983	29 June 2007	Jacques Faucheux	PS	Social worker - regional advisor (1986–2004)
29 June 2007	In progress	Louis Feuvrier	DVG	General councillor of the Canton of Fougères-Nord (until 1994); President of Fougères communauté (1983–2014)

=== International relations ===
Fougères is twinned with:

- Ashford, Kent, United Kingdom, since 1984
- Bad Münstereifel, Germany, since 1967

These two towns have also been paired together since 1964.

- Ouargaye, Burkina Faso
- Somoto, Nicaragua
- Śrem, Poland

==== Map of twin towns ====
A map of the world with Fougères and its twin towns highlighted

== Demography ==
Fougères is an industrial town and its typical demographic trends show very well. In the 1850s, the Brittany town was "moving in the manufacture of leather shoes to solve a crisis in the shoe industry." Success followed (the Cordier factory, for example) and Fougères saw its population increase by 124% from 9,344 inhabitants in 1856 to 20,952 in 1901, an increase of 11,608 people in less than 50 years (or more than the population of Vitré). At the beginning of the 20th century, Fougères became the capital of female footwear: "...more than 12,000 workers are distributed in 40 factories. In 1946, they manufacture 10.7% of French production for town and fancy use and 7% of work shoes" (Jérôme Cucarull).

The crisis of the 1930s put what must be called an industrial district into difficulty (Florent Le Bot). The mass-closure of SMEs and the concentration of employment into fewer companies (mainly Réhault, JB Martin and Morel et Gâté) provided a second wind to the Fougères industry (4,500 employees in 1966). The slowdown in growth during the second half of the 1960s, then the oil shock in 1973, caused a massacre in the footwear sector, particularly in February–March 1976, with the closure of three companies (Réhault, Morel et Gâté and Maunoir) and the dismissal of 1,140 employees. Since 2008 and the closure of Hasley, only the JB Martin company maintains the tradition of footwear production in Fougères (F. Le Bot, Laurence Héry).

Historical population

Year	Pop.	±% p.a.
1793	7,177	—
1800	7,297	+0.24%
1806	7,443	+0.33%
1821	7,600	+0.14%
1831	7,677	+0.10%
1836	9,384	+4.10%
1841	9,182	−0.43%
1846	9,931	+1.58%
1851	9,083	−1.77%
1856	9,344	+0.57%
1861	9,470	+0.27%
1866	9,580	+0.23%
1872	11,201	+2.64%

Year	Pop.	±% p.a.
1876	11,873	+1.47%
1881	14,325	+3.83%
1886	15,578	+1.69%
1891	18,221	+3.18%
1896	20,735	+2.62%
1901	20,952	+0.21%
1906	23,537	+2.35%
1911	22,178	−1.18%
1921	21,167	−0.47%
1926	21,061	−0.10%
1931	21,033	−0.03%
1936	20,432	−0.58%
1946	19,281	−0.58%

Year	Pop.	±% p.a.
1954	23,151	+2.31%
1962	24,279	+0.60%
1968	26,045	+1.18%
1975	26,610	+0.31%
1982	24,362	−1.25%
1990	22,239	−1.13%
1999	21,779	−0.23%
2007	20,678	−0.65%
2012	20,040	−0.62%
2017	20,418	+0.37%
2023	20,307	−0.09%

Population without double counting from 1962 to 1999; municipal population from 2006
Source: Ldh/EHESS/Cassini until 1999 then INSEE from 2007

Since the end of World War II, the Trente Glorieuses boosted Fougères and the town increased its population until the 1975 census, arriving at almost 27,000 inhabitants.

By 1975, the town had suffered deeply from the oil crisis of 1973 and had been hit. The town was devastated by successive closures of factories from a crisis in the shoe sector, and refused the implantation of the Citroën company on its territory. The city struggled to recover and saw its population fall. The town went from a population of 26,610 in 1975 to 19,820 in 2008, a 26% decline in population in 34 years, although suburbanisation offset this decline. Today the shoe sector has a few hundred jobs in the town: For example, the JB Martin company remains in Fougères, even though it has completely relocated its production to Asia. The town is growing in relation to Rennes since the inauguration of the Autoroute des Estuaires in 2000, which provides access to Rennes in 30 minutes, and has achieved a satisfactory development based on the growth of more diversified economic activities. More than 30 hectares (74 acres) of business parks, between the motorway and the city centre, give an economic attractiveness to the area.

The urban area of Fougères has 20 communes gathering 42,818 inhabitants (2009) including 46% of this population which is in the town centre. This makes the Fougères urban area the 164th of 241 large urban areas of France.

Inhabitants of Fougères are called Fougerais (male) and Fougeraise (female) in French.

== Economy ==
There used to be an important shoemaking industry which is now almost extinct. There was also an important glass making industry.

During the Middle Ages, salt was heavily taxed and was imported from the Breton regions to the rest of France. Fougères was made a stronghold for "salt smugglers", who would creep along the wall of the city with confiscated salt, to sell in other regions. There is a communal garden in modern Fougères that commemorates this interesting and little-known fact.

Fougères was the seat of the Chamber of commerce and industry of the Pays de Fougères until 2011, replaced since by a delegation from the Chamber of commerce and industry of Saint-Malo-Fougères after the merger of these.

In 2008, the major employers in Fougères were the Centre hospitalier de Fougères, Sagem-Safran Group (through the company now called Safran Electronics & Defense), Carl Zeiss Vision, the town of Fougères, the Transports Gélin, Carrefour (Sofodis), the Association Jean-Baptiste Le Taillandier (AREP and the Notre-Dame-des-Marais, Edmond Michelet, Saint-Joseph, and Beau-site schools), the Jean Guéhenno city school, the Groupe Royer, and Groom, as well as Otima.

== Health ==
The central hospital of Pays de Fougères has just completed its renovation in 2013: It offers access to 13 care services, emergency, maternity, 16 specialties and 440 beds.

The elderly have two suitable facilities: The Henri Rebuffé sheltered housing, opened in 1987 in the former premises of the Morel et Gaté firm in the Bonabry quarter, and the Cotterêts sheltered housing.

== Teaching ==
Higher education is present at Fougères, notably in the field of health:

- Institute of nursing training (hospital)
- Bertin school of hearing aids (CCI Fougères training hub)
- Fizeau graduate school of Optics (CCI Fougères training hub)
- Charles-Edouard-Guillaume School of Fine Watchmaking (CCI Fougères training hub)
- The Fougères CCI Training Institute

== Planning and living environment ==
The town has 38 designated remarkable trees. Several specimens, including sweet chestnut, tulip trees, sequoias, and Araucaria, can be seen in a private park along Boulevard Saint-Germain.

=== Quarters ===
In Fougères, five councils of quarters have been implemented:

- Centre-ville - Urbanistes
- Forairie - Cotterêts
- Paron-Orieres - Écartelée - Bonabry
- Montaubert - Rillé - Saint-Sulpice
- Madeleine - Sermandiere - Chattiere

=== Parks and green spaces ===
- The public garden: Located in the upper town, it offers a remarkable panoramic view of the town, overlooking the castle and the medieval quarter around Saint-Sulpice church.
- The Val Nançon: A landscaped garden which offers many ambiances to be discovered and measured. An exhibition of contemporary works including L'Œuvre à la Vie of Louis-Marie Catta has been present since 2000.
- The Orières Park: Extended more than 4 hectares (9.9 acres), the stream of Groslay joins a small pond and a playground. There is also a sporting course.
- René-Gallais Park: In front of the Juliette Drouet cultural centre.

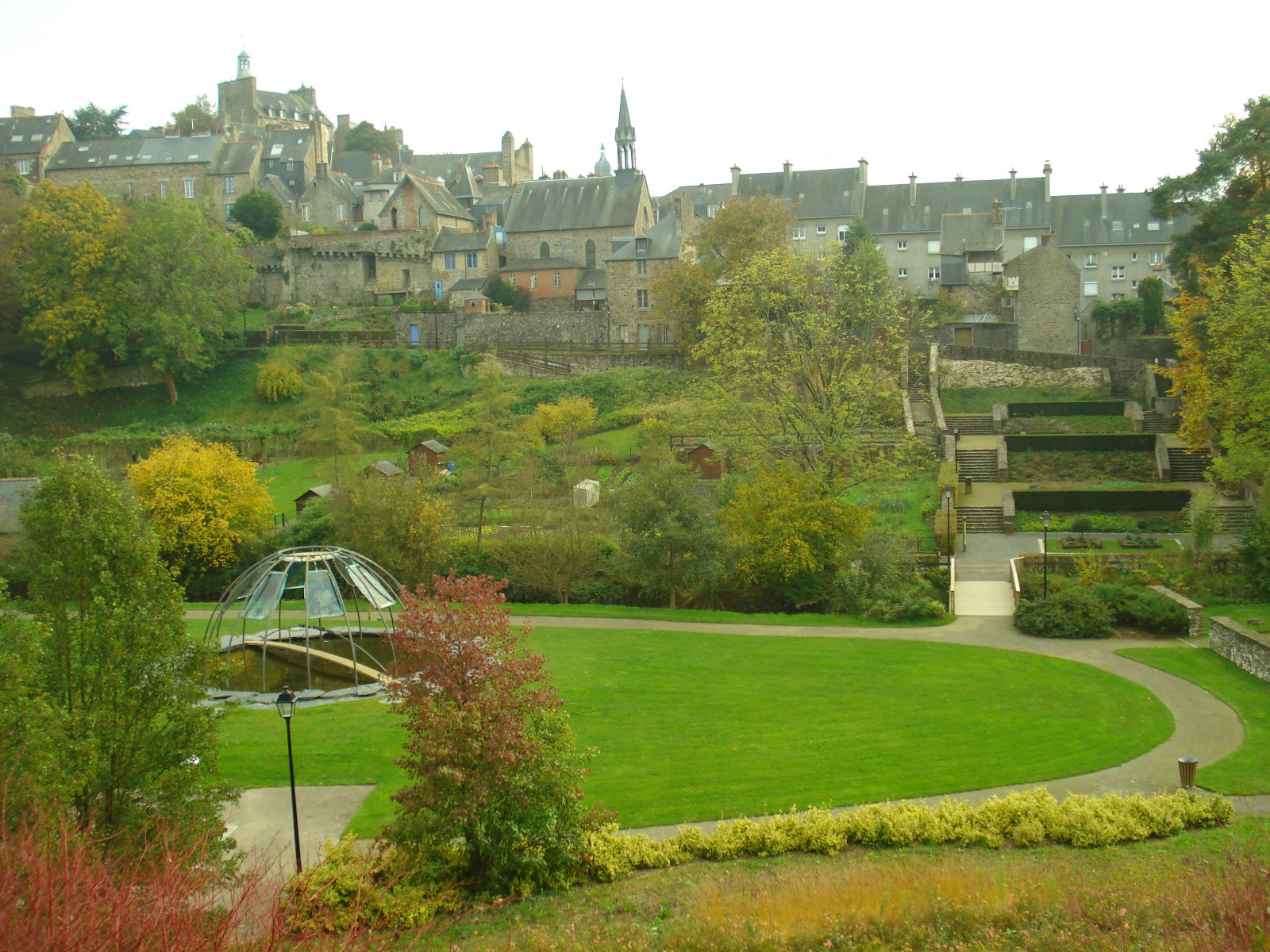
The Val Nançon

- La carrière du Rocher Coupé [the quarry of cut rock], nicknamed the Carrière de Californie [California Quarry], is an exceptional place to walk near the castle. A lake now replaces the former corneal shale operation which ran until 1999 and was acquired from the town. At 60 metres (200 ft) depth, the lake is more a place of underwater diving training.
- Pedestrian paths marked out on the ground, allow for the discovery of the upper and the lower town, as well as its many monuments. The walk along the old railway, from the bridge of the slaughterhouse, leads to the forest of Fougères.

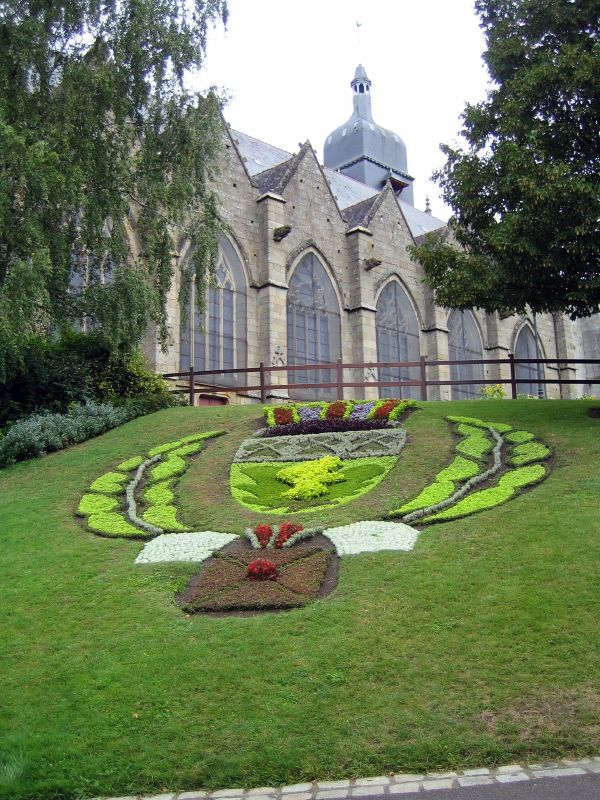
A view of the public garden and the Church of Saint-Léonard

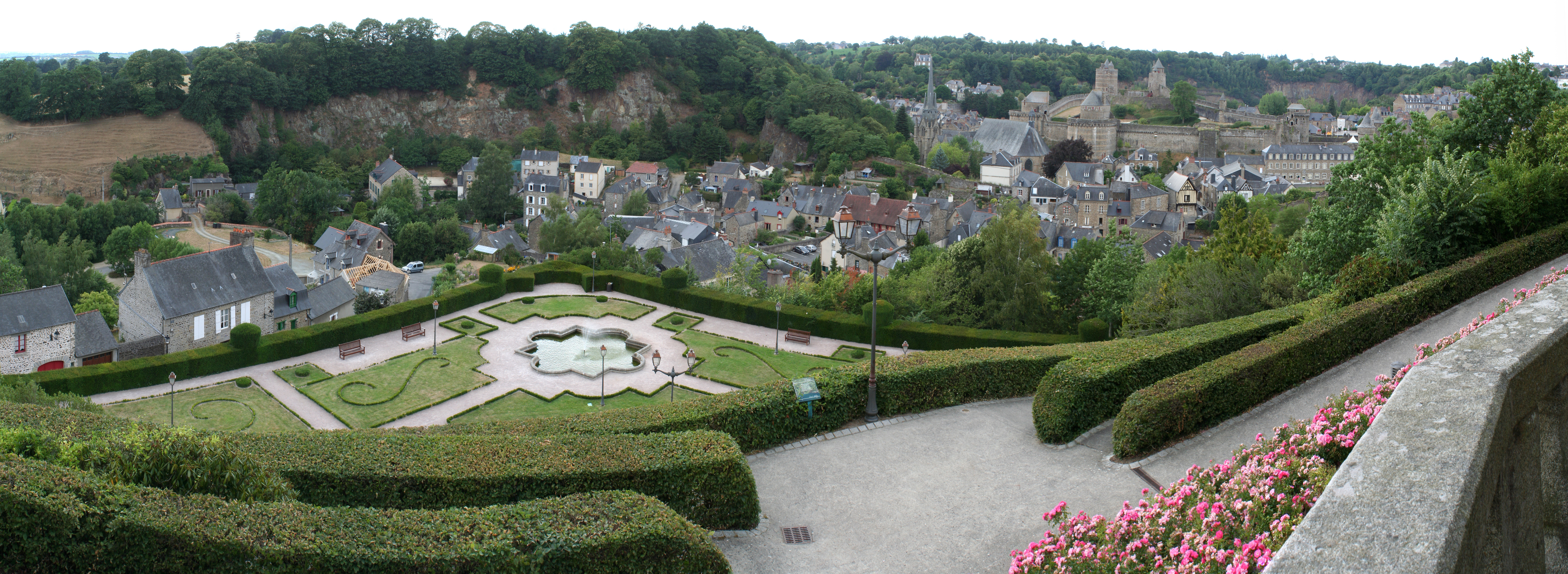
The public garden

=== Flowers ===
Fougères participates in the contest of flowery cities and villages and has the label of four flowers (220 cities rewarded in France) and five in Ille-et-Vilaine for the quality of its planning and management of the landscaped areas. The signs are located at all entrances of the city.

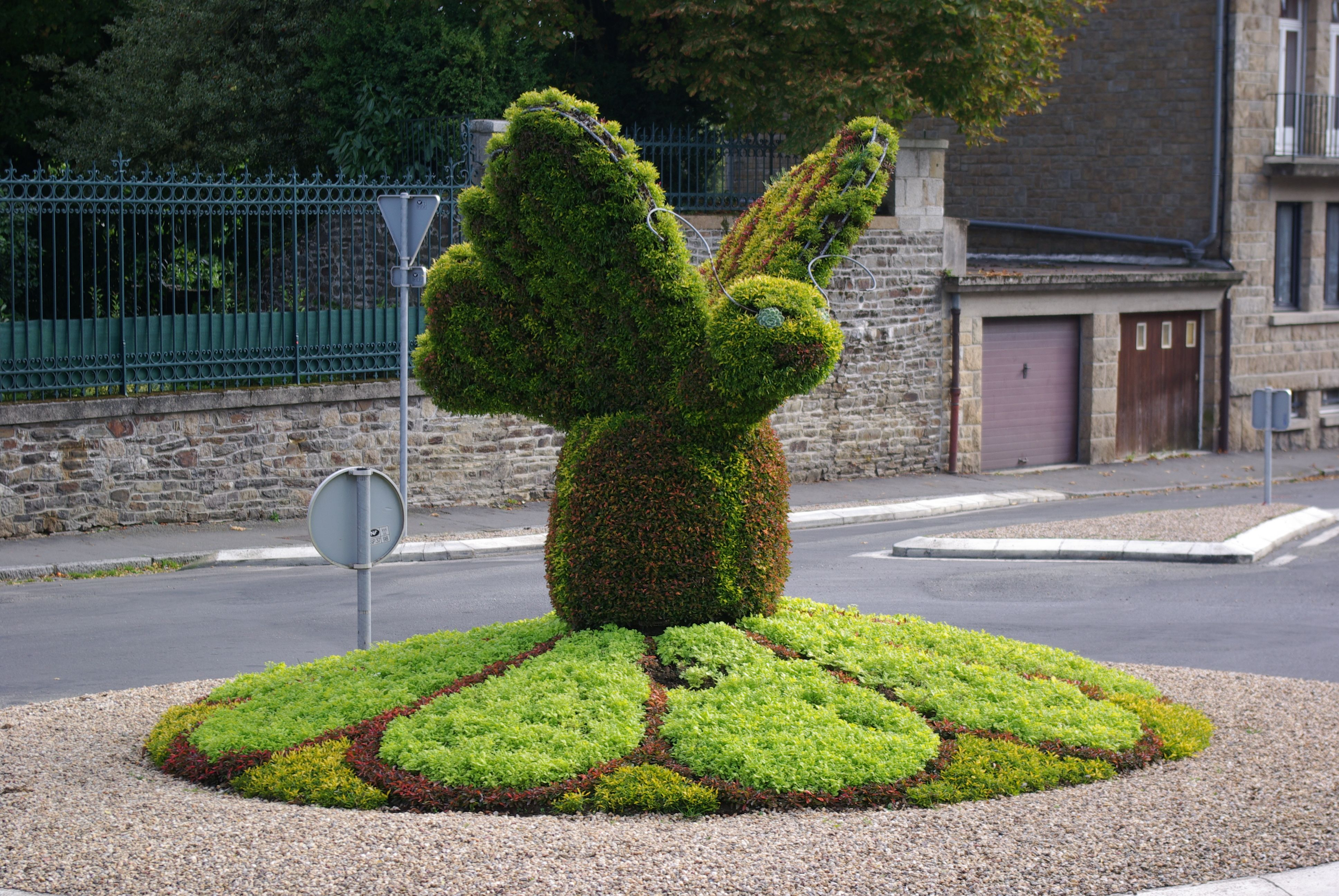
A Fougères roundabout

== Transport ==
=== Public transport ===
Route	Main stops
1	Guénaudière - Carnot - Guénaudière
2	Lécousse Bellevue - Carnot - Javené Fressynet
3	Piscine - Carnot - Verrerie
4	Javené Croix Guérin - Carnot - Cotterêts
5	Javené Bioagropolis - Carnot - Lécousse Pilais

Fougères is also served by the Illenoo interurban network.

- Route 9a Rennes <> Liffré <> Fougères
- Route 13 Fougères <> Vitré
- Route 17b Fougères <> Pontorson
- Route 18 Fougères <> Louvigné-du-Désert <> Saint-Georges-de-Reintembault

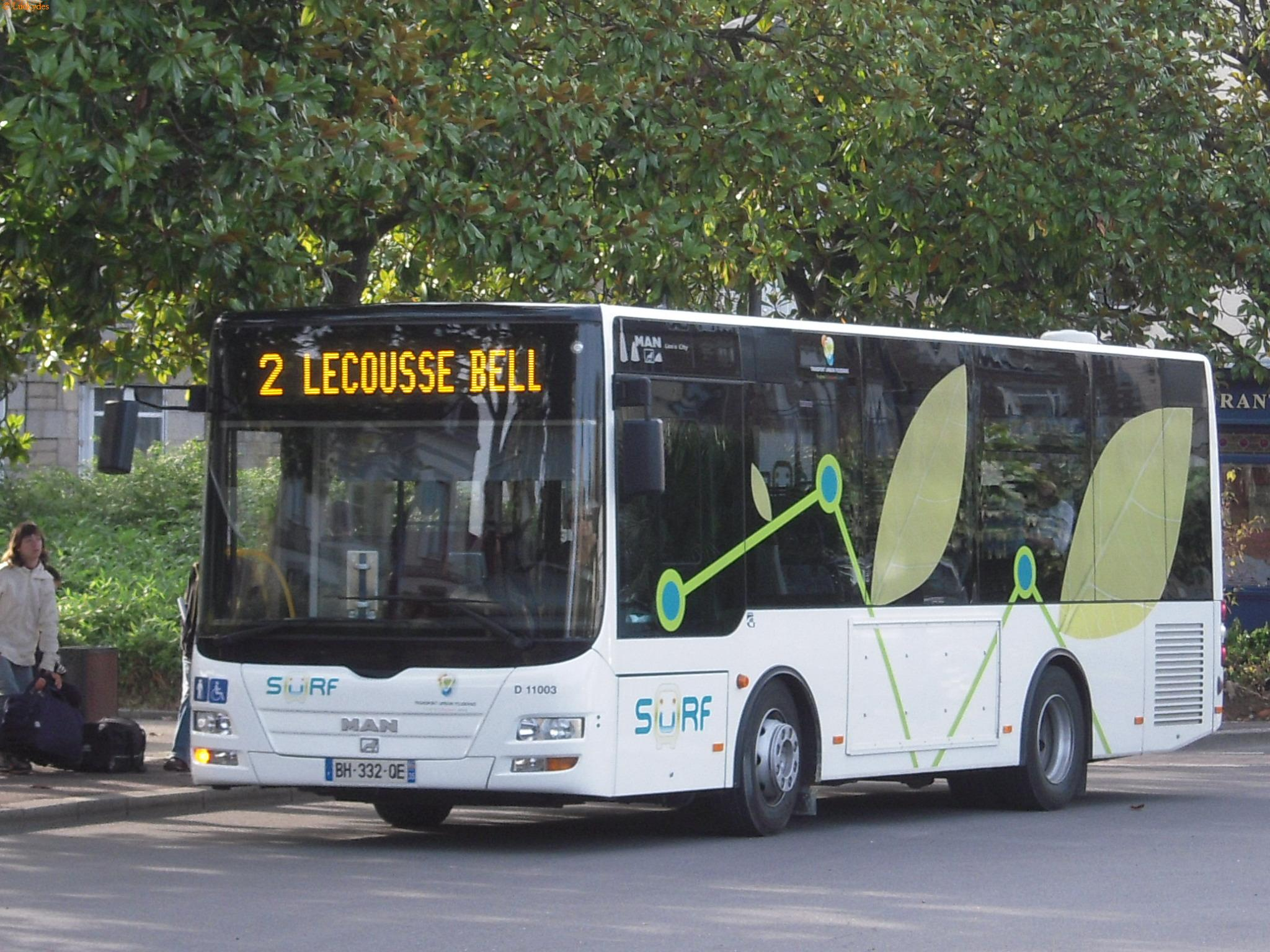
Surf-branded bus

=== Road ===
Fougères is served by the A84 autoroute linking Caen to Rennes.

=== Railway ===
Since the cessation of regular passenger traffic between Fougères and Vitré in 1972, only freight and some special trains continued to circulate until 1991, when Fougères station closed. Subsequently, the building served as an SNCF point of sale, until its demolition in 2001 to make way for a shopping complex in the town centre.

For some time, the idea of the return of trains to Fougères has risen in some minds, but eluded most of the local elected representatives.

== Sports and recreation ==
In the former Réhault factory, renovated and renamed Les Ateliers, near the glassworks factory, houses many associations as well as the Maison des associations. More than 100 associations are listed in the field of sport and recreation in particular.

The town will host the start of stage 7 of the 2018 Tour de France.

=== Sports facilities ===
The town has numerous municipal sports facilities to allow the people to practice their sport in the best possible conditions:

- Paron Sports Complex: Football fields and gymnasium
- Jean-Manfredi Sports Complex (Paron South): Football pitches, rugby, athletics track, velodrome, golf driving range, skating rings, tennis courts
- Berthelot Municipal Stadium: Football field
- Justy-Speker Gymnasium
- Madeleine Stadium: football pitch and athletics track
- The Cotterêts multi-sport gymnasium
- The Chattière Sports Centre gymnasium

Other complementing facilities:

- Aquatis aquatic centre, Fougères community, inaugurated in May 2010: sports pool and ditch diving (Interior) and fun (Interior and exterior), aquaboggan, jacuzzi, Turkish bath, sauna, water games.
- Chênedet outdoor base (Fougères community) on the edge of the forest of Fougères, on the road to Louvigné-du-désert
- CRAPA (Rustic Circuit of physical activity) in Chenedet, near the pond

Private sports centres also exist:

- Montaubert equestrian centre
- Dojo of the Pays de Fougères
- Fougerais Tennis Club
- Salle de l'Espérance
- Shooting range

=== Sports clubs ===
- AGL-Drapeau Football (since September 2011) is a new club born from the fusion of two historic associations of the town.
  - AGL Football (until May 2011) which has been organising the Mondialito (mini World Cup bringing together 32 clubs from Brittany and neighbouring departments). These 32 clubs accounted for a weekend the 32 nations qualified for the world in Germany. They have also, for the occasion, worn the complete outfit of the country, offered by the AGL Football.
  - Le Drapeau Football (until May 2011)
- AGL Handball
- Pays de Fougères Basket basketball club
- Espérance Fougères Tennis & Tennis Club fougerais (TCF)
- Fougères Volley Ball
- Fougerais swimming club and water polo since the 1970s
- Fougères Rugby-Club-AGL
- BCPF Badminton Club of the Pays de Fougères
- Vigilant Fougères athletics
- ASPTT Fougères athletics

=== International women's basketball tournament ===
Each year the town of Fougères invites four nations to participate in a basketball tournament. This tournament concerns U17 (under 17 years old) or U16 (under 16) female competitors. For three nights (Thursday, Friday and Saturday), each nation competes. In addition to the matches, a 3-point contest is held where the basketball players from each nation must score as many 3-point baskets as possible.

After three matches, the player who has scored the most points is titled "best scorer of the tournament".

The first tournament was in 1993, won by Russia. France has had the most wins (7) ahead of Russia (6) and Australia (3).

== Culture ==
Fougères is a town of Art and History (Villes et Pays d'Art et d'Histoire), a designation assigned to historic areas by the French Ministry of Culture and Communication. The town was involved in the rebellion against the French Revolution in 1793. A skirmish near Fougères was the subject of the French painter Julien Le Blant's (1851–1933) most famous work Le Bataillon Carré, Affaire de Fougères 1793, which won a Gold Medal in the Exposition Universelle in 1889. This large work is now located in the United States, at the Lee Library on the campus of Brigham Young University.

=== L'association de formation et d'animation populaire ===
L'association de formation et d'animation populaire [The association of training and popular animation] - or AFAP - is an association created in 1976 whose objective is "to bring together persons wishing to experience and develop traditional cultures in the pays de Fougères (music, dance and singing)." With nearly 200 members, it annually organises the Froger-Ferron prize, whose 25th anniversary in 2011 was marked by the presence of Graeme Allwright.

=== Bagad Bro Felger ===
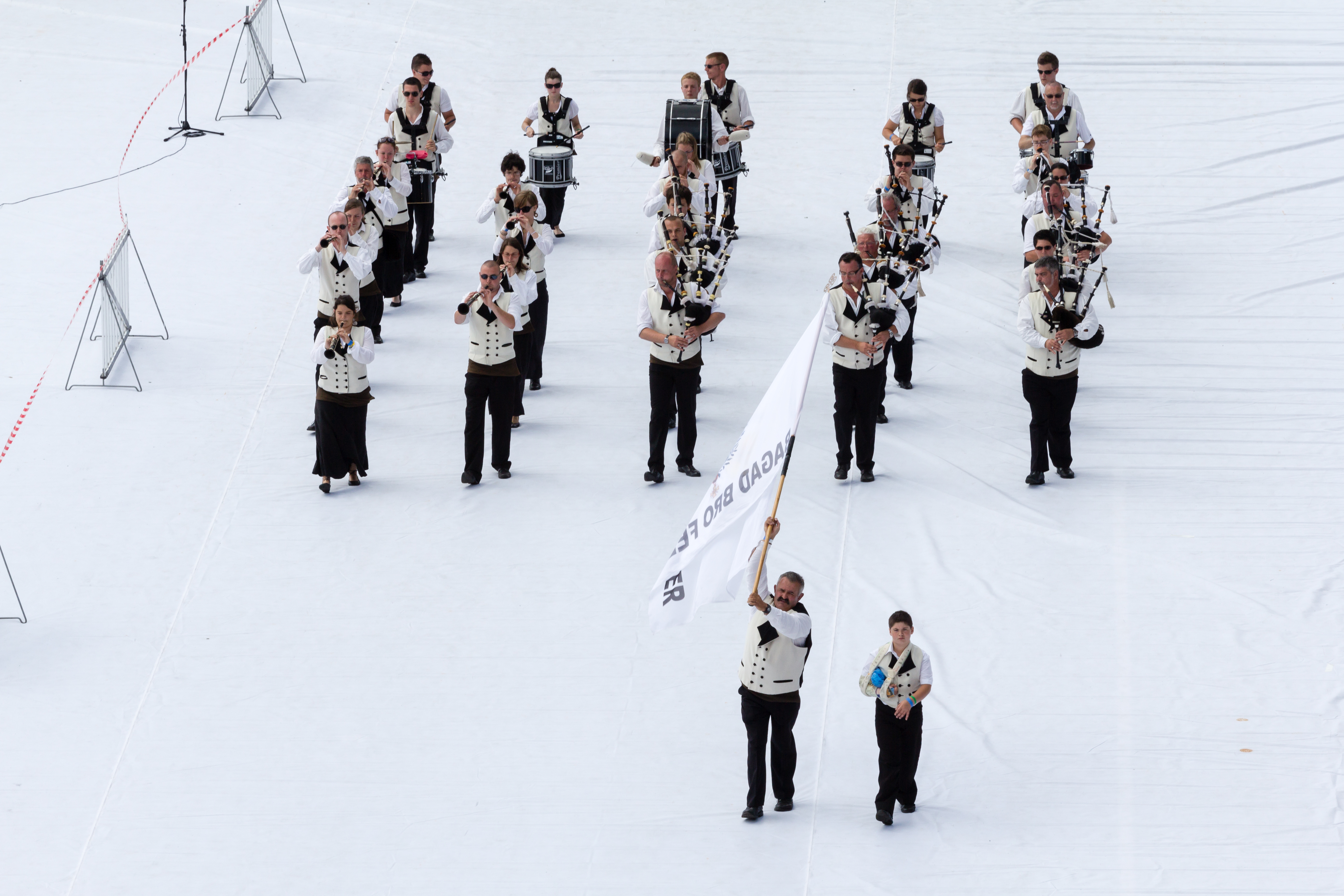
The Bagad Bro Felger during the big parade of the Festival interceltique de Lorient in 2012, arriving in the Moustoir Stadium.

The Bagad Bro Felger is an ensemble of traditional Breton music from the lands of Fougères, created in the autumn of 2002 at Fougères. A member of the Bodadeg ar Sonerion federation, it currently competes in 2nd category of the national championship of the bagadou and is present at many festivals in France.

=== Bagad Raoul II ===
Still active to date, it is the first bagad of the town and one of the first of Brittany, created in 1954, it quickly took the name of Raoul II in honour of the founder of the town of Fougères.

=== Breton language ===
A Diwan school was opened in September 2013, where 14 children are enrolled, or 0.7% of the commune's primary schoolchildren.

=== Festival Voix de Pays ===
Every year in July, the Festival des Voix de Pays [Festival of the Country Voices] is held within the walls of the castle, organized by the Juliette-Drouet de Fougères Community cultural centre. This event has taken place for more than twenty years,

== Media ==
The newspapers and journals of Fougères are:

- The daily edition of Ouest-France of Fougères.
- The La Chronique Républicaine weekly (most 77,000 readers) appears every Thursday and speaks mainly of Fougères news but also of all of the Pays (Antrain, Saint-Brice-en-Coglès, Louvigné-du-Désert, Liffré, etc.) and also of the Pays de Vitré, northern Mayenne, and the south of Manche. Founded in 1837, it has changed title several times to become La Chronique Républicaine in 1944.
- Le Pays de Fougères, a quarterly journal created in 1975, describes the history, economy, traditions, arts and literature of the Pays de Fougères. Published for thirty-two years, it disappeared in 2007.

There are local information magazines published on the metropolitan area, such as La Lettre of the Fougères community.

Several free radio stations have existed in Fougères, namely:

- Radio des Marches de Bretagne (RMB): 20 December 1983 – 1986. Its premises were located at 41 Rue Nationale. Its slogan was la radio fruitée [fruity radio]. At the end of the 1980s, the RMB team ended up split into two. One group decided to merge with RCV (Radio Cité Vitré) to give birth to FPB (Fréquence des Portes de Bretagne). The other team, meanwhile, created Galaxie.
- Fréquence des Portes de Bretagne (BPF): 1986–97
- Radio Mélusine: 1984-1992: Its premises were located at 1 Rue Nationale, on the floor of the current Victor-Hugo theatre, abandoned at the time.
- Radio Galaxie: 1986-1992: Its slogan was l'onde magique [the magic wave], sung by the Costa brothers who made the broadcast design of the station.
- Radio Mélusine Galaxie: 1992–97
- Radio des Trois Provinces - Crystal FM - Sensation

== Notable people ==
=== People from Fougères ===
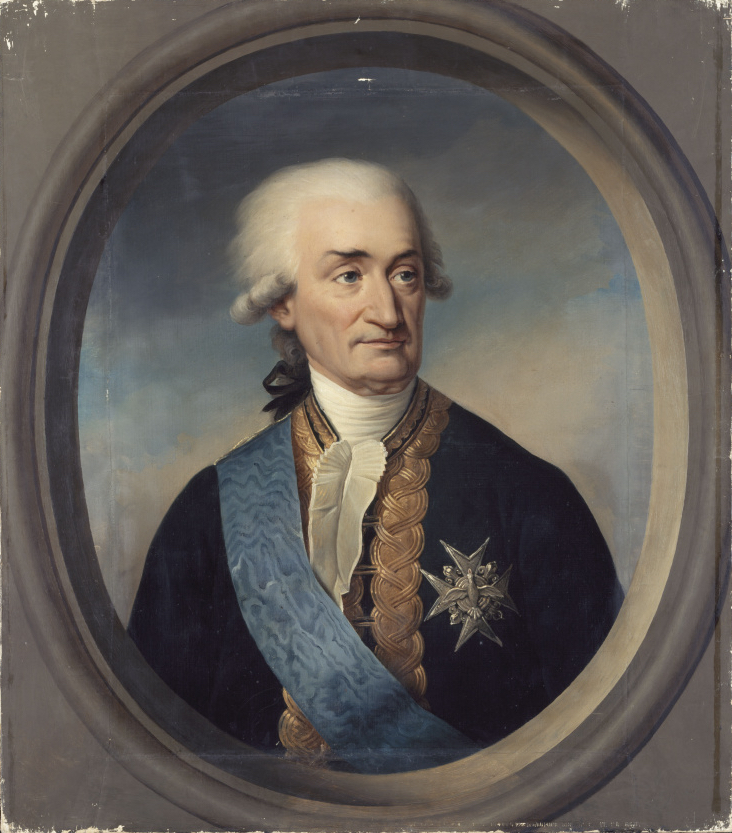
Luc Urbain du Bouëxic de Guichen

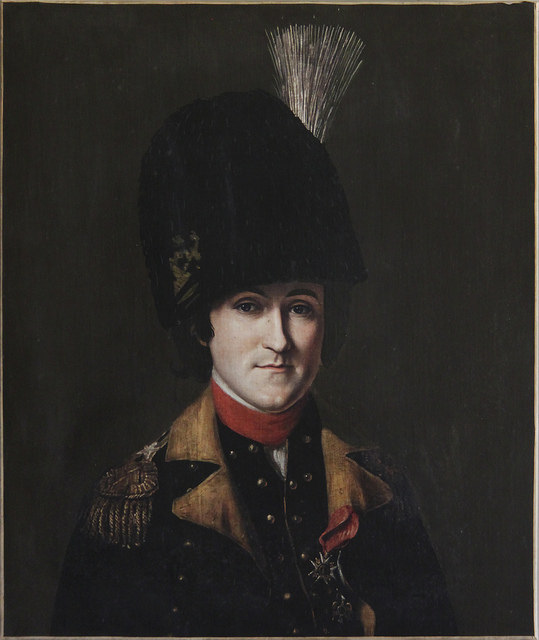
Armand Tuffin de La Rouërie

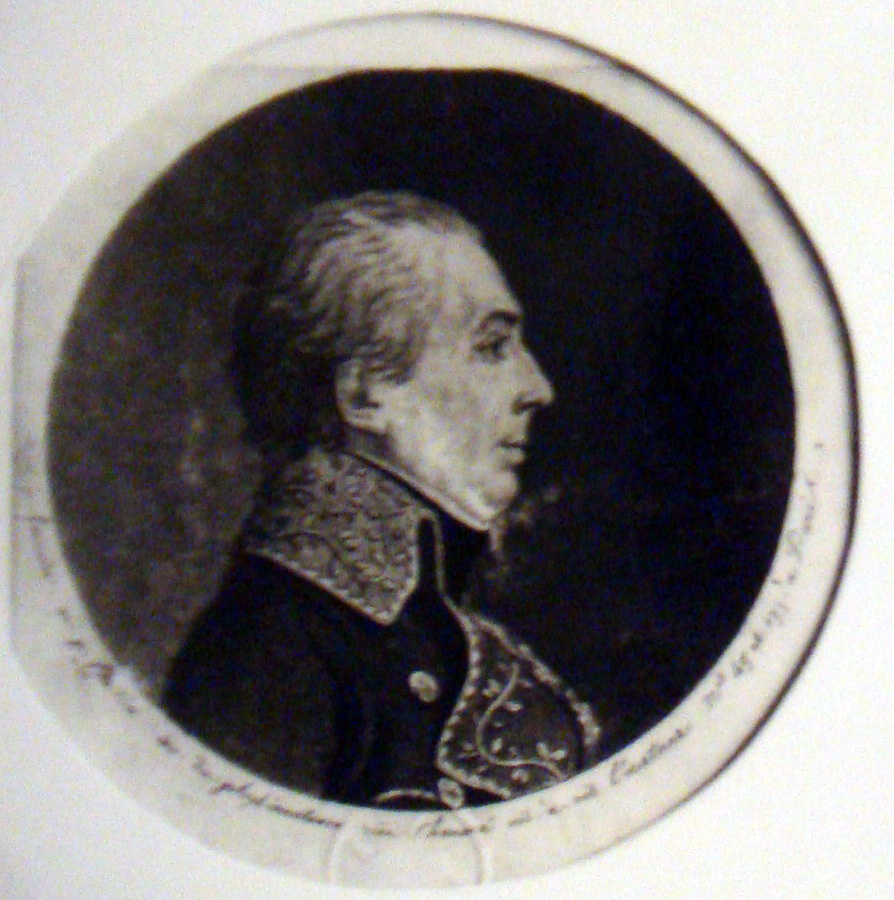
François René Jean de Pommereul

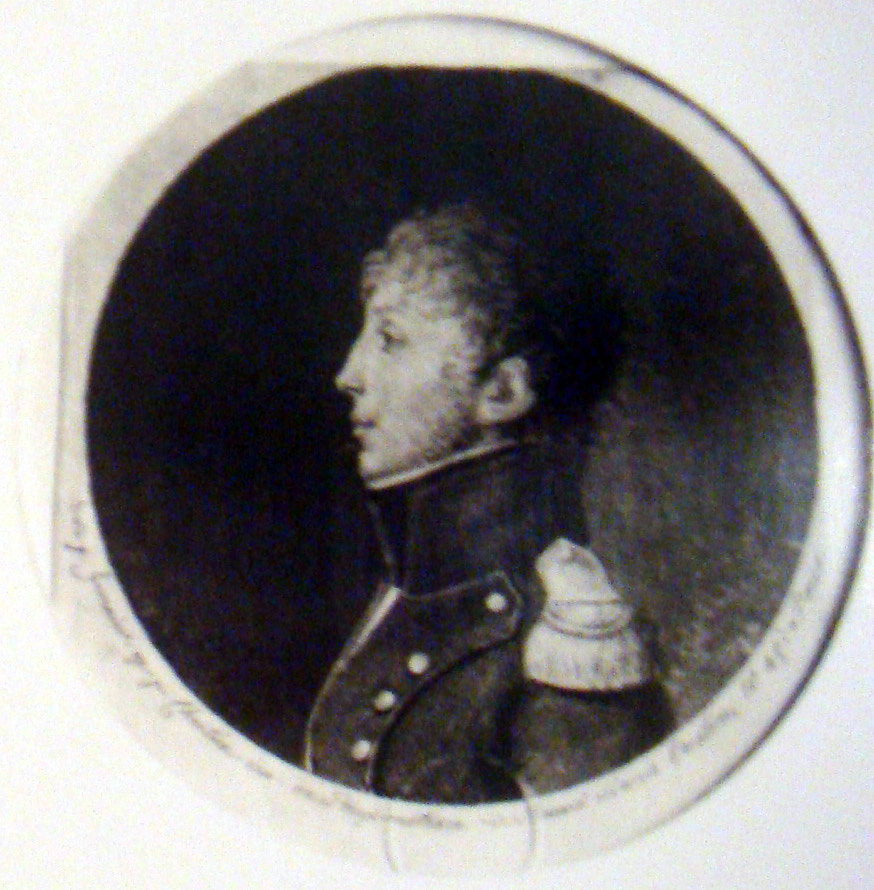
Gilbert de Pommereul

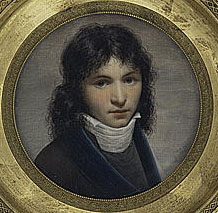
Aimé Picquet du Boisguy

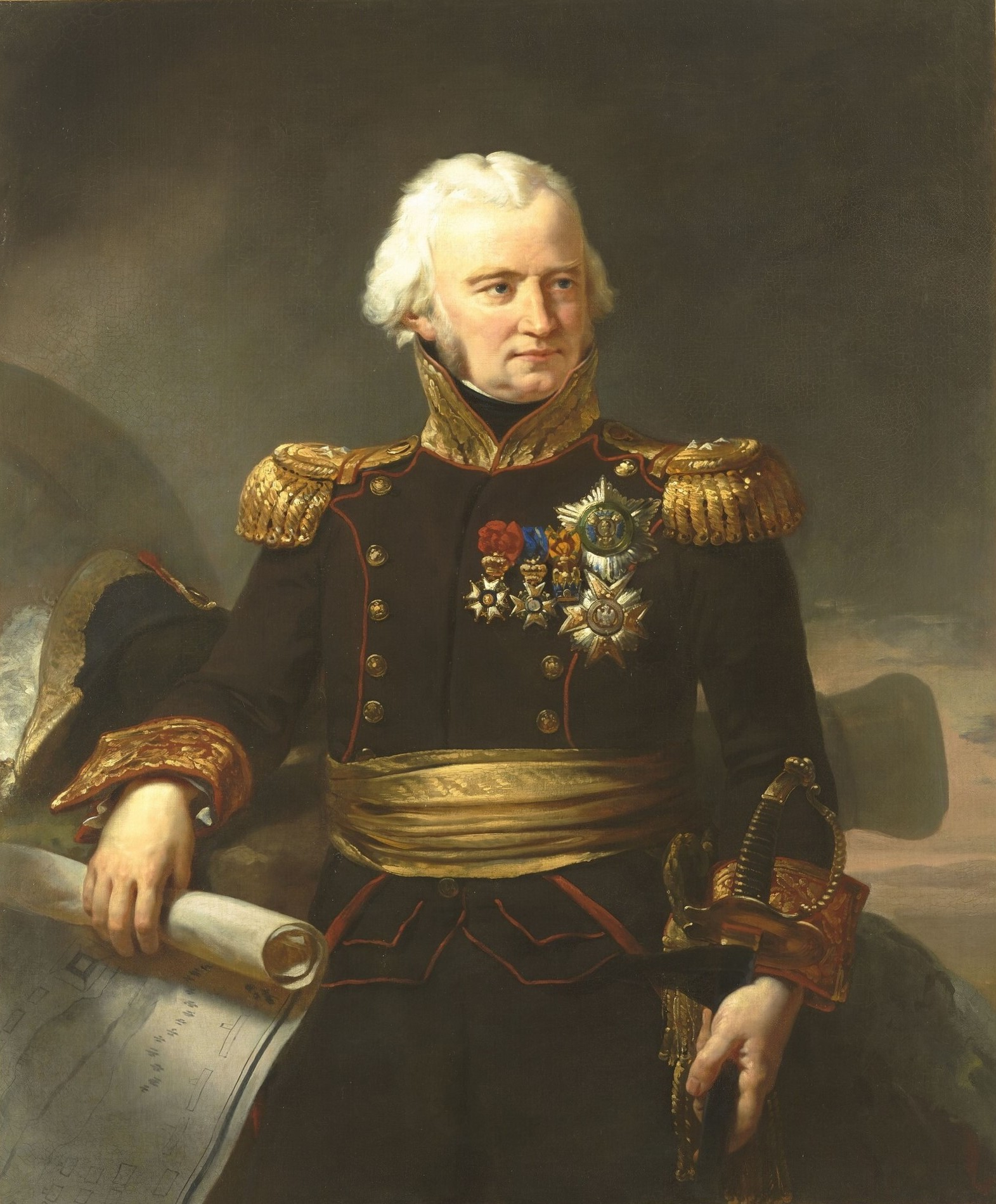
Jean Ambroise Baston de Lariboisière

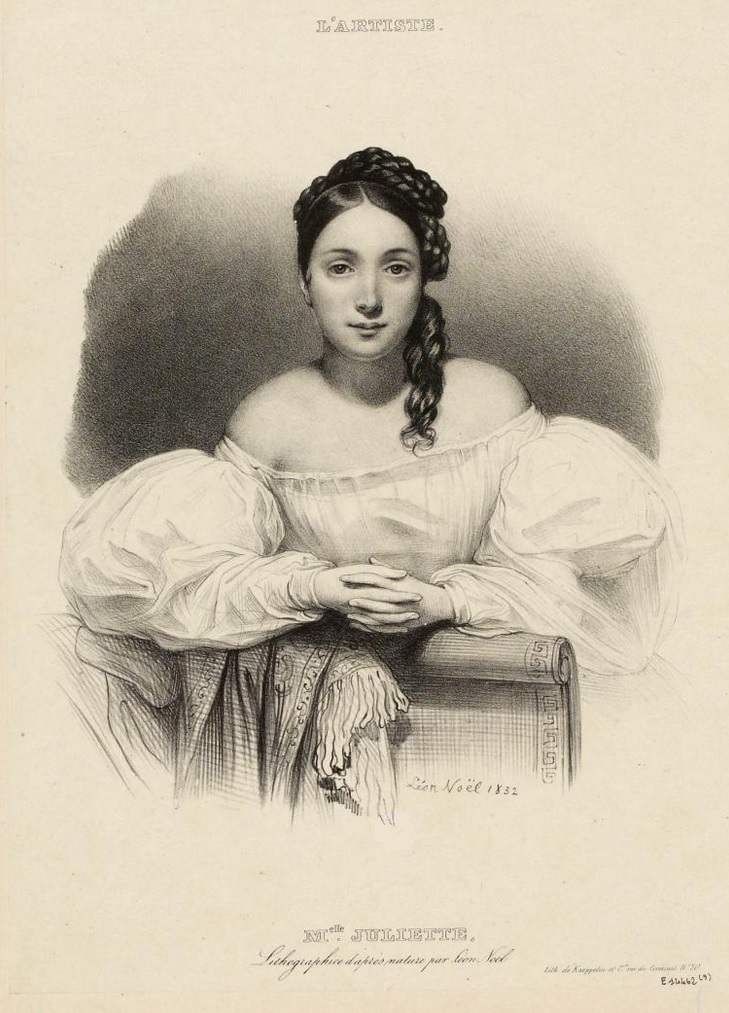
Juliette Drouet

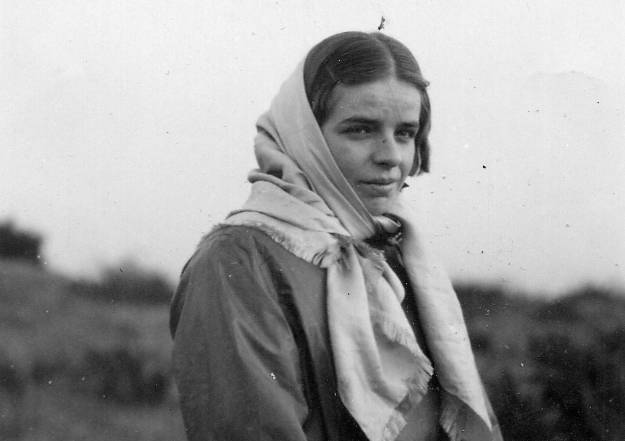
Thérèse Pierre
- Eolia, mummy
- Hardouin de Chartres, intellectual and Breton professor, conducted a school in the 11th century.
- Yves Bachelot (1700–1779), religious.
- Luc Urbain de Bouëxic, comte de Guichen (1712–1790), lieutenant general of the naval armies under Louis XV and Louis XVI.
- Charles Armand Tuffin, marquis de la Rouërie, known as "Colonel Armand" (1751–1793), general of the army during the American War of Independence, head of the Breton Association under the French Revolution.
- Julien-Jean-François Loysel (born 1751), magistrate and politician.
- Thérèse de Moëlien Trojolif (1759–1793), cousin of La Rouërie, Member of the Breton Association.
- Aimé Picquet du Boisguy (1776–1839), general of the Chouans of Fougères and Vitré, Maréchal de camp under the Restoration.
- Louis Picquet du Boisguy (1774–1804), Chouan officer, brother of the former.
- Guy Picquet du Boisguy (1772–1795), Chouan officer, brother of previous.
- Jean Ambroise Baston de Lariboisière (1759–1812): general and baron of the Empire, inspector-general of artillery under the First Empire.
- François René Jean de Pommereul (1745–1823): general and baron of the Empire, prefect of Indre-et-Loire, then prefect of Nord under the First Empire.
- Gilbert de Pommereul (1774–1860), general of the Empire, son of the former.
- Jean-Marie Bachelot La Pylaie (1786–1856), botanist and explorer.
- Juliette Drouet (1806–1883), actress, mistress of Victor Hugo. She gave her name to the Juliette-Drouet cultural centre.
- Hyacinthe du Pontavice de Heussey (1814–1876), poet.
- Pierre Heude (1836–1902), zoologist.
- Jean-Marie Laloy (1851–1927), architect.
- Eugène Filâtre de Longchamps (1852–1927), magistrate, vice-président of the Mixed Courts of Alexandria, Egypt 1884-1902.
- Emmanuel Auguste Victor Marie de La Villéon (1858–1944), painter.
- Lucien Haudebert (1877–1963), composer
- The Abbé Louis Bridel (1880–1933).
- Georges Le Rumeur (1882–1941), nationalist Breton and Breton language poet.
- Constant Duclos (1885–1962), first French military parachutist.
- Jean Guéhenno (1890–1978), writer, journalist and academic. He has given his name to two public schools.
- Théophile Briant (1891–1956), poet.
- Charles Berthelot (1901–1940), professional football player.
- Thérèse Pierre (1908–1943), resistant, responsible for the Arrondissement of Fougères where it participated actively in the Organization of the FTP, she was captured by the Gestapo and killed at the Jacques-Cartier Prison in Rennes. A public college bears her name in Fougères.
- Georges Franju (1912–1987), filmmaker and director.
- Yak Rivais (born 1939), author of children's literature.
- Philippe Nogrix (born 1942), politician.
- Christian Georgeault (born 1955), Breton independence of Emgann.
- Bruno Bertin (born in 1963), comic writer and artist.
- Pascale Fonteneau (born 1963), journalist and novelist.
- Hervé Coudray (born in 1965), basketball coach.
- Laurent Huard (born 1973), former professional football player for Stade Rennais, AS Saint-Étienne and CS Sedan Ardennes. He is now a coach at Stade Rennais training centre.
- Samuel Buquet (born 1976), illustrator.
- Laurent Despas (born 1977), journalist, founder of the Pan-African media Koaci.com.
- Frédéric Molas (born 1982) and Sébastien Rassiat (born 1982), creators of the Joueur du Grenier YouTube web series
- Fabien Lemoine (born 1987), professional football player trained at Stade Rennais, evolving from 2011 at AS Saint-Étienne.
- Paul Lapeira, (born 2000), professional cyclist

=== People who have stayed in Fougères ===
- François-René de Chateaubriand: he often came to Fougères where one of his sisters lived. He did not keep a very good memory of the place:

At my sisters, the province was in the middle of the fields. We went dancing neighbours as neighbours, playing the comedy which I was sometimes a bad actor. In winter, it was necessary to suffer the small town society at Fougères, dances, meetings, dinners.

— François-René de Chateaubriand

- Balzac: After having discovered Fougères in 1828, he wrote the novel Les Chouans. (Read the novel in French on Wikisource). A hotel on Rue Nationale bears his name.
- Victor Hugo stayed in Fougères with his mistress Juliette Drouet in June 1836.
- Joueur du grenier is living in Fougères with his staff.

== Gallery ==
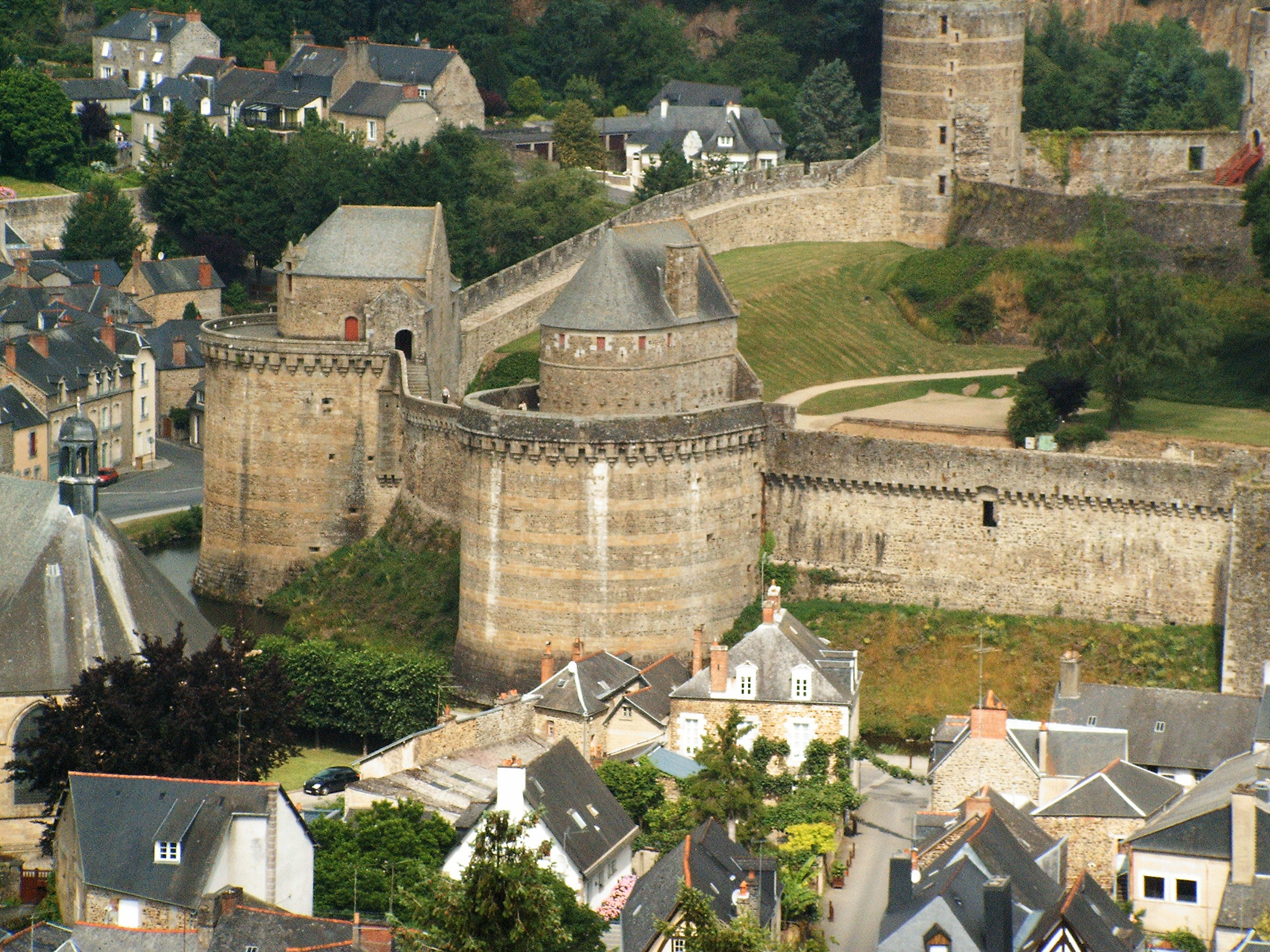
A view of the château

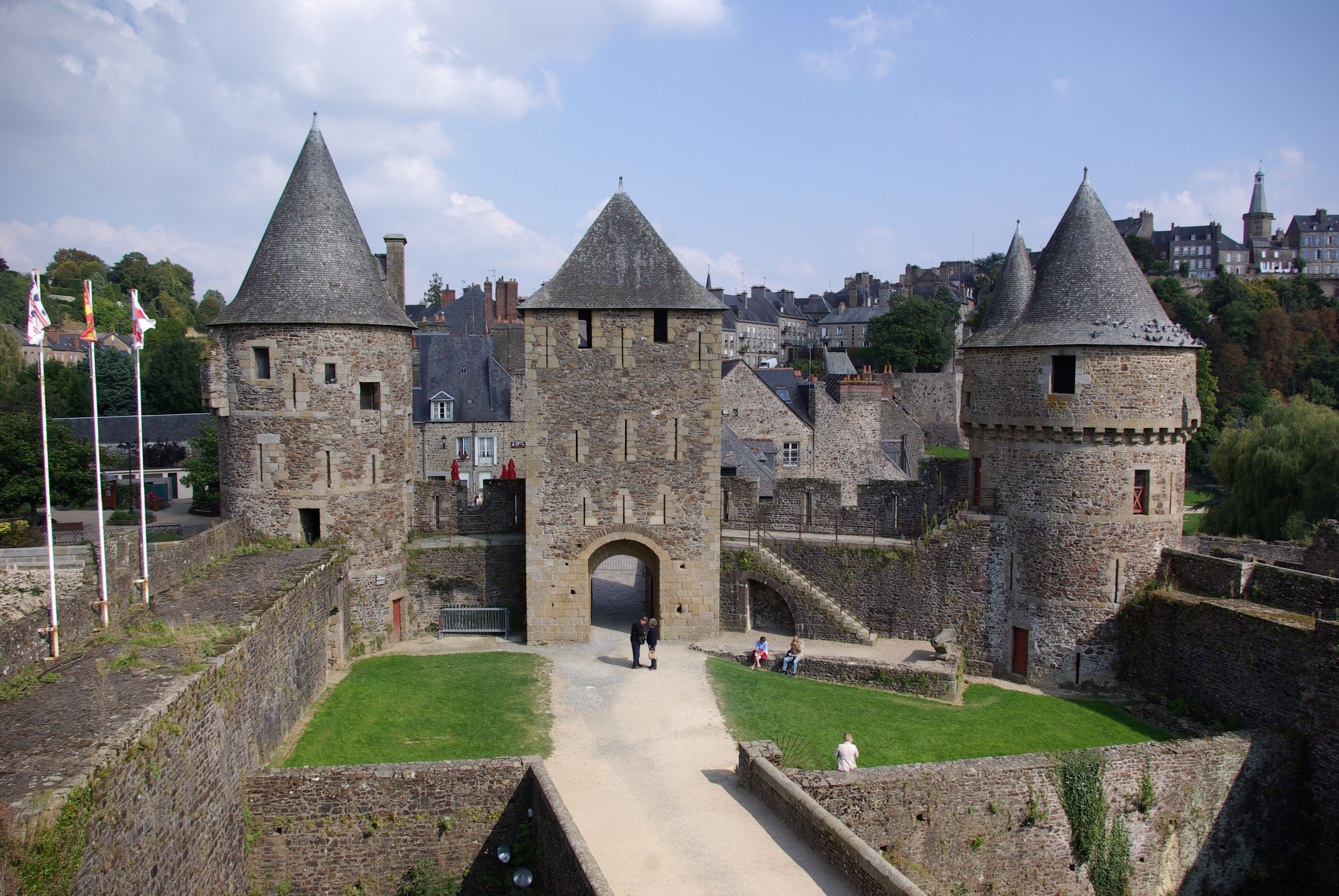
The château

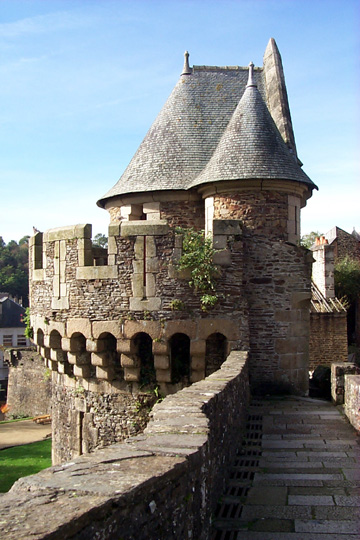
Tour Nichot and the ramparts of the upper town

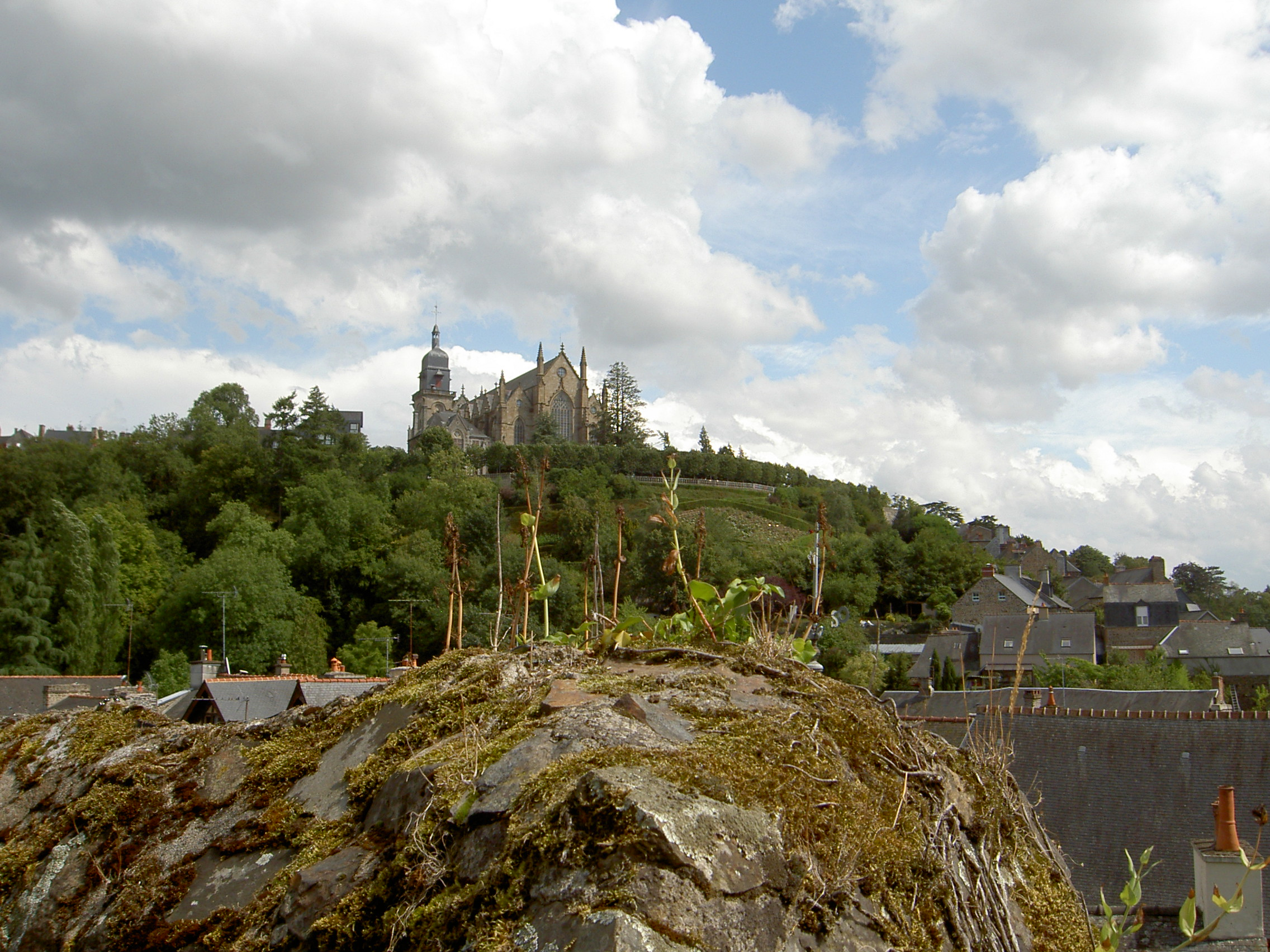
Upper town: Public garden and Church of Saint-Léonard

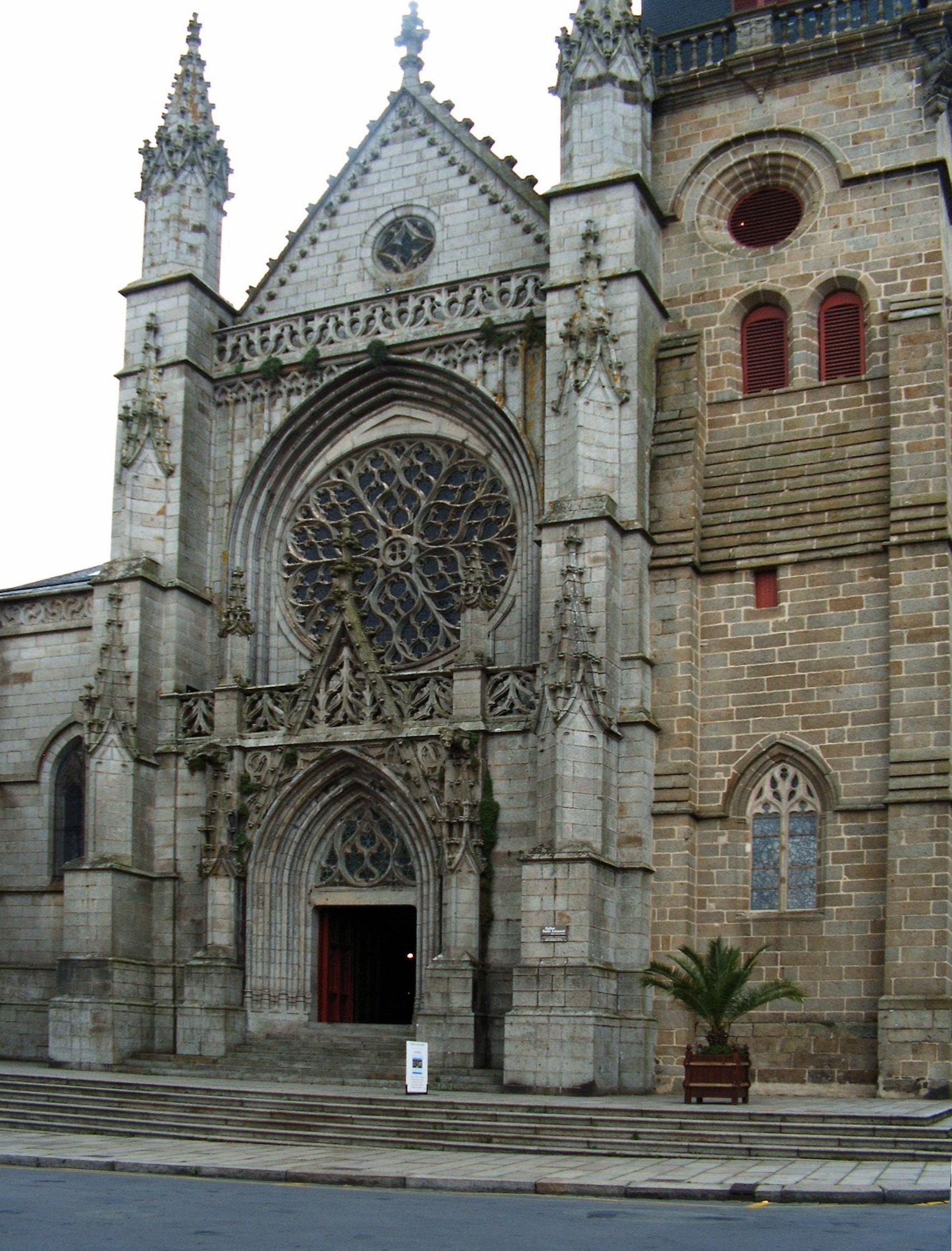
The Church of Saint-Léonard

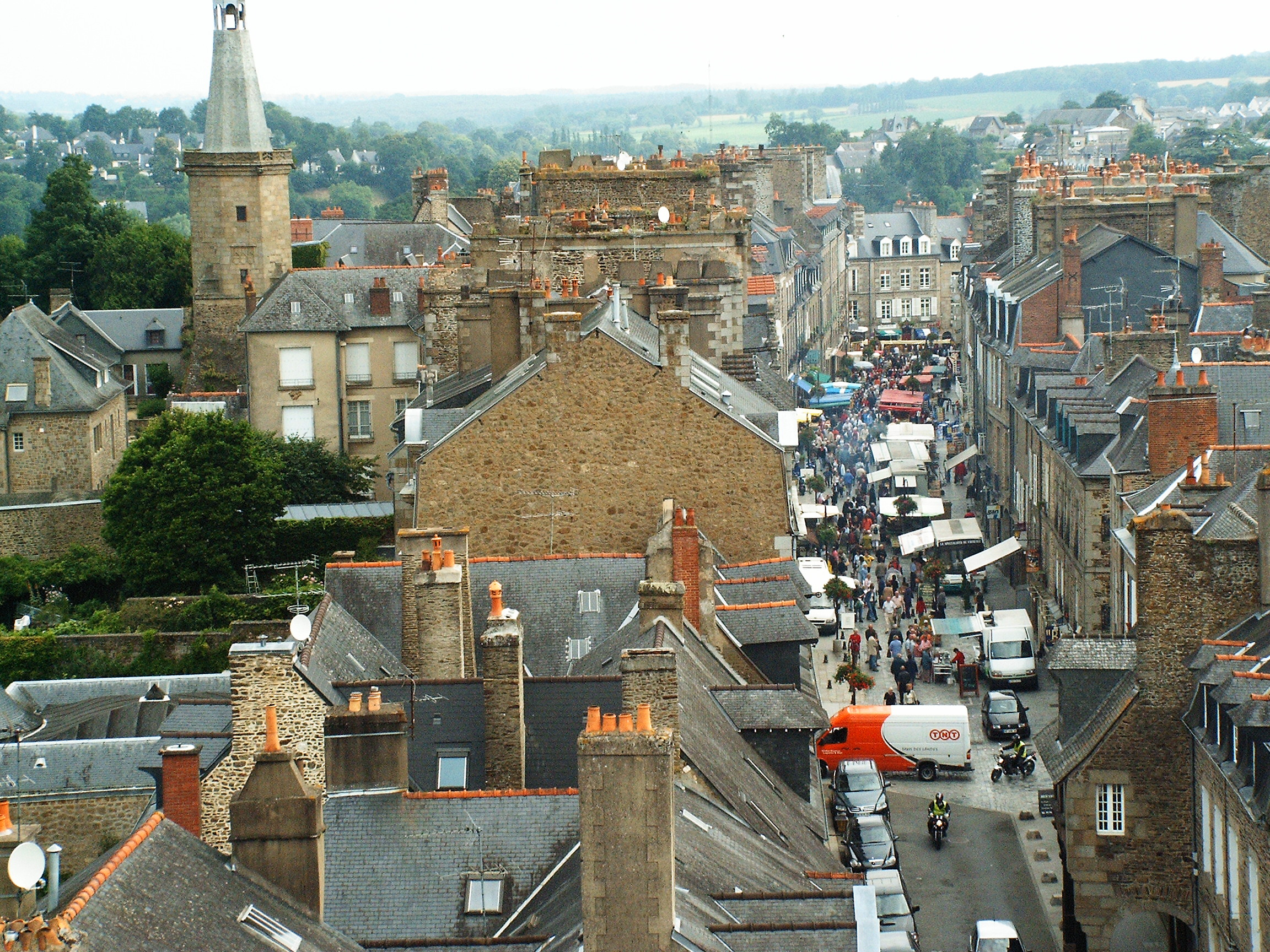
A view from the Church of Saint-Léonard

== See also ==
- Communes of the Ille-et-Vilaine department
- The works of Jean Fréour. Sculptor of Armand Tuffin de La Rouërie statue
- Le Pays de Fougères
- L'Œuvre à la Vie
- List of historic monuments of Fougères

== Bibliography ==
- Dagnet, Amand (1890). Le Patois fougerais (dialecte haut-breton), essai de grammaire. Comprenant : remarques sur la prononciation des sons et articulations, règles sur les équivalences ou mutations des sons et articulations du français au fougerais, notes philologiques, étymologiques…, les 10 parties du discours et 16 modèles de conjugaison. Suivi d'un vocabulaire français-fougerais et fougerais-français, d'une anecdote et d'une chanson en fougerais [The Patois Fougères (haut-Breton dialect), grammar test. Including: remarks on the pronunciation of sounds and articulations, rules on standing or mutations sounds and articulations of French in Fougères, philological notes, etymological ... 10 parts of speech and 16 conjugation patterns. Followed by a French-Fougères and Fougères-French vocabulary, a story and a song in Fougères] (in French). Laval : impr. This book won the literary and archaeological contest 1889 Rennes Grand Honor Prize offered by the President of the Republic Sadi Carnot.
- Dagnet, Amand (1899). Croyances populaires du pays fougerais. Au pays fougerais : il était une fois [Popular beliefs of Fougères country. In Fougères lands: Once upon a time] (in French) (1 dans la Chronique de Fougères ed.). Rennes. ISBN 2-906064-07-6. Réédité en 1923, Rebuffé, Fougères; Réédité en 1988, Rue des scribes.
- Dagnet, Amand (1901). La Fille de la Brunelas [Daughter of Brunelas] (in French). Fougères: Louis Tiercelin. then published in three acts and four tables in 1918. His performances in 1927 under the auspices of the Regionalist Federation of Britain and, from 1936 through the circle Fougères "Art and Folklore" of Gaït Corvaisier, did enter the dialect in the theaters of cities.
- Badault, D.; Chevrinais, J.-C. (1994). Mémoire en images: Fougères [Memories in images: Fougères] (in French). Rennes: A. Sutton.
- Cucarull, Jérôme (2001). L'Enquête orale, source de l'histoire industrielle et technique. L'exemple des ouvriers de la chaussure de Fougères [Oral Survey, the source of industrial and technical history. The example of the workers of the Fougères Shoe] (in French). Rennes: Presses Universitaires de Rennes. pp. 131–146. in Geslin (C.) (dir.). La Vie industrielle en Bretagne, une mémoire à conserver.
- Heudré, Bernard (1980). Fougères : le pays et les hommes [Fougères: the land and the men] (in French). Coutances. 216 p.
- Le Bot, Florent (2006). LESCURE (Michel) (ed.). Les ressorts du développement du district fougerais de la chaussure, XIX-XXe siècle [The springs of the development of Fougères district of the shoe, nineteenth - twentieth century] (in French). Paris: CHEFF. pp. 139–166. La mobilisation du territoire. Les districts industriels en Europe occidentale du XVIIe au XXe siècles.
- Le Bot, Florent; Héry, Laurence (2009). La chaussure en France au XXe siècle : la fin d'une industrie ? Comparaison du SPL fougerais et de l'entreprise Noël à Vitré, face aux crises des années 1930 et des années 1970-1980 [Footwear in France in the twentieth century: the end of an industry? Comparison of SPL Fougères and Noël à Vitré company, faced with the crises of 1930 and 1970-1980] (in French). A. and J. Picard. pp. 217–234. Pierre Lamard, Nicolas Stoskopf, Actes du colloque « Une décennie de désindustrialisation (1974-1984).
- Le Bouteiller, C. (1912). Notes dur l'histoire de la ville et du pays de Fougères [Notes of the history of the town and the lands of Fougeres] (in French). Rennes. 4 vol.
- Pitois, Jean-Marie (1998). L'Industrie de Fougères au XIXe siècle, Mœurs et coutumes - Souvenirs d'un vieux fougerais [Fougeres industry in the nineteenth century, Manners and customs - Memories of an old Fougères] (in French). Lécousse: Imprimerie Labbé. edited and narrated by Daniel Bouffort, Jérôme Cucarull et Daniel Heudré.
- Stéphan, Gaston (1908). Le Lock-out de Fougères - novembre 1906-février 1907 [The lock-out of Fougères - November 1906-February 1907] (in French). Rennes: Imprimerie bretonne. PhD thesis.
- Hérisset, Jean; Lemancel, Marc (2010). Le Pays de Fougères [The lands of Fougères] (in French). éditions Ouest France.
- Badault, Dominique; Chevrinais, Jean-Claude (2006). Fougères, Mémoire en images de poche [Fougères, memories in handheld images] (in French). Saint-Cyr-sur-Loire: éditions Alan Sutton.
- "Fougères et sa forêt" [Fougères and its forest]. Itinéraires découvertes (in French) (1189). Ouest France. 30 July 1996.
