= Château de Fougères =

Castle in Brittany, France

- Fougères, France
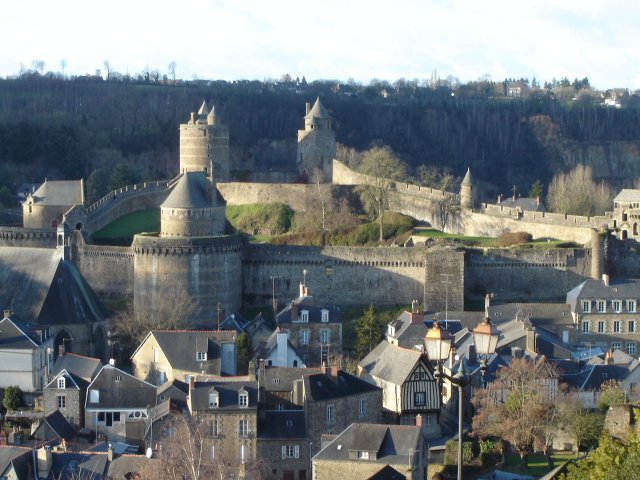
- Château de Fougères

Location
- Coordinates: 48.3536°N 1.209444°W

The Château de Fougères is a castle in the commune of Fougères in the Ille-et-Vilaine département of France. The castle was built on a naturally protected site, a rock emerging from a swamp surrounded by a loop of the Nançon river acting as a natural moat. It had three different enclosures: the first for defensive purposes; the second for day to day usages in peacetime and for safety of the surrounding populations in times of siege; and the last for the protection of the keep. In all it has an impressive 13 towers.

== History ==
The first wooden fort was built by the House of Amboise in the eleventh century. It was destroyed in 1166 after it was besieged and taken by King Henry II of England. It was immediately rebuilt by Raoul II Baron de Fougères, who used to keep his donkeys there – and to this day their successors can often be seen grazing in the castle courtyard. Fougères was not involved in the Hundred Years' War until 1449, when the castle was taken by surprise by an English mercenary. In 1488, the French troops won the castle back after a siege and the castle lost its military role. Today the castle belongs to the municipality and is one of Europe's largest medieval fortresses.
