= Hôtel de Ville, Fougères =

Town hall in Fougères, France

Hôtel de Ville
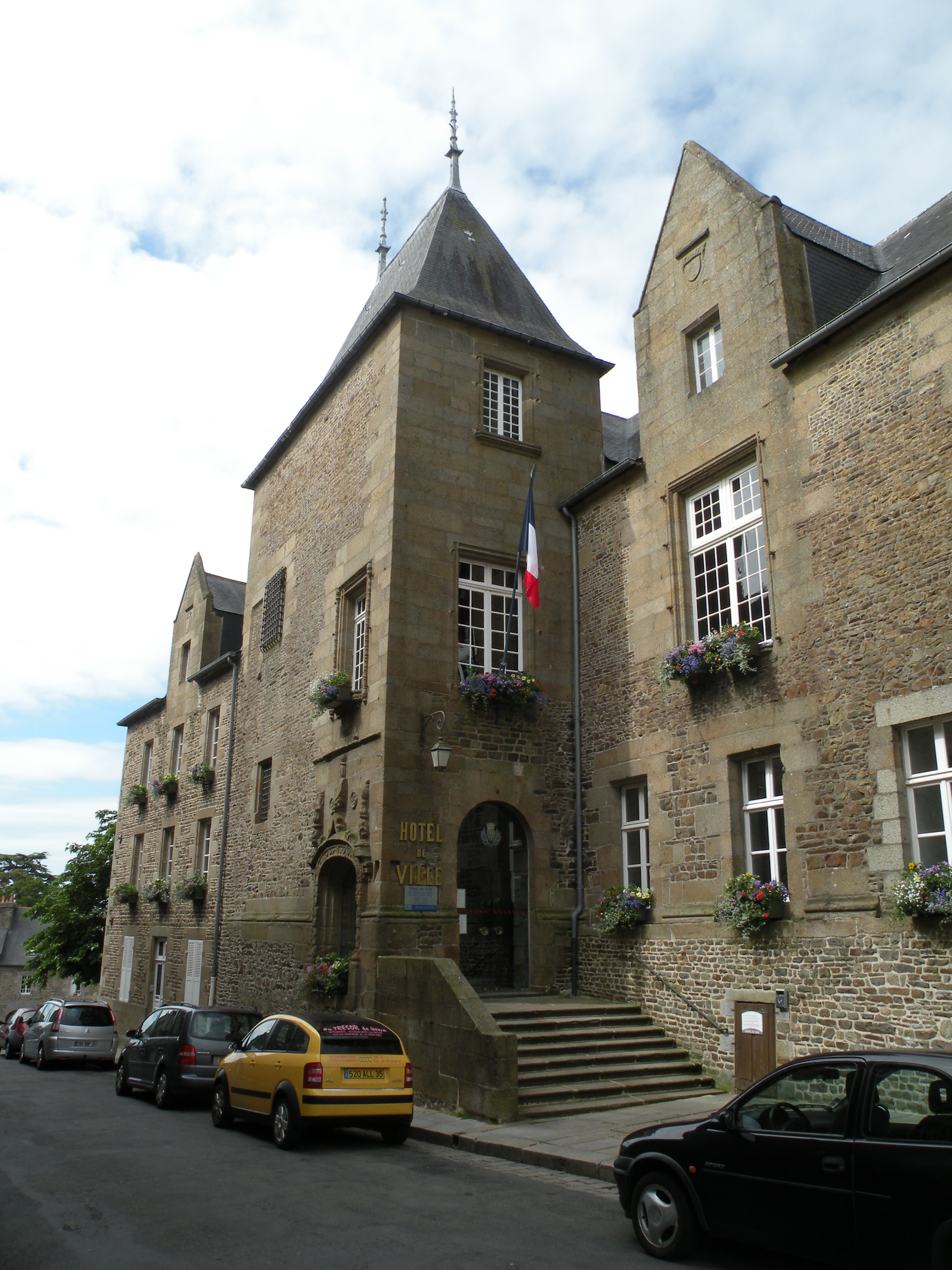
- The main frontage of the Hôtel de Ville in June 2010

General information
- Type: City hall
- Architectural style: Medieval style
- Location: Fougères, France
- Coordinates: 48.3515°N 1.2045°W
- Completed: 1535

The Hôtel de Ville (French pronunciation: [otɛl də vil], City Hall) is a municipal building in Fougères, Ille-et-Vilaine, in northwestern France, standing on Rue Porte Saint-Léonard. It was designated a monument historique by the French government in 1926.

== History ==
The white lady

The first municipal building in Fougères was the belfry on Rue du Boële (now Rue de Beffroi) in the northwest of the town. It was designed in the medieval style, built in metamorphic rock and was completed in 1397. The design involved a two-stage tower surmounted by a spire. The building was used for "assemblées de paroisse" (parish assemblies) at which the burghers would discuss municipal business.

In the early 1530s, as the town developed around the Church of Saint-Léonard, the burghers decided to establish a new town hall in that area. The site they selected was adjacent to the church and was occupied by a building containing an old vaulted chamber dating back to the 12th century. The vaulted chamber was incorporated into the new building which was designed in the medieval style, built in rubble masonry and was completed in 1535.

The design involved an asymmetrical main frontage in two sections facing onto the street (the central and the right-hand parts of the current complex). The left-hand section of two bays, which was projected forward, formed a tower with a pyramid-style roof; it was fenestrated by a segmental-headed opening in the right-hand bay and by an casement window above. The right-hand section of three bays was fenestrated by three casement windows on the ground floor and by a larger casement window on the second floor; it also featured a gabled attic floor above the central bay. The complex was enlarged in the 19th century when an extra section of three bays was added on the left (i.e. to the south): this section was fenestrated by casement windows in a regular pattern on three floors with a gabled attic floor above the central bay. On the south-facing wall of the tower, an external staircase was added leading up to a round-headed opening which became the main entrance. Internally, the principal rooms included the Salle des Mariages (wedding room) which was originally conceived as a ballroom and featured two fine fireplaces.

Works of art in the building include a marble sculpture of a young boy sitting on a panther: it was created by the sculpter, Louis Martin, in 1899. There is also a copy of the painting by Isidore Pils entitled "Rouget de l'isle chantant la Marseillaise pour la première fois", the original of which is in the Musée historique de Strasbourg. A marble statue of a ghostly white lady created by the sculptor, Sophia, was installed inside the segmental-headed opening in the tower in 1993: it recalls the Dame blanche of French folklore.
