= Thérèse de Moëlien =

Thérèse de Moëlien (1759–1793) was a French counter-revolutionary and agent during the French Revolution.

She was the cousin of the counter revolutionary Charles Armand Tuffin, marquis de la Rouërie. She was a member and financier of the counter-revolutionary organisation Association Bretonne and active in gaining supporters for it. After the arrest of Tuffin she was arrested and executed by guillotine.
