= Mathis Valin =

French motocross racer

- Nationality: French
- Born: 18 August 2006 (age 20) La Roche-sur-Yon, France

Motocross career
- Years active: 2025-Present
- Teams: •Kawasaki Racing Team MX2 (2025-Present)
- Championships: •2023 FIM 125cc; •2024 EMX 250cc
- Wins: •MX2: 1
- GP debut: 2025 GP of Argentina, MX2
- First GP win: 2026 GP of Germany, MX2

Mathis Valin (born 18 August 2006) is a French professional Motocross racer. Valin has competed full-time in the MX2 class of the Motocross World Championship since the 2025 season.

During the 2026 FIM Motocross World Championship, Valin took his first overall grand prix win, when he won the MXGP of Germany in the MX2 class.

Prior to racing in MX2, Valin won the 2023 FIM Motocross Junior World Championship in the 125 class and the 2024 European Motocross Championship in the EMX250 class.

Valin represented France at the 2025 and 2026 Motocross des Nations, forming part of the team that finished third overall in the event at the former.

In France, Valin is a three-time champion in the French Elite Motocross Championship, winning the Elite MX2 class in 2024. When he won the Junior 125 class in 2023, he recorded a perfect season, winning every race in the series.

== Career ==
=== Junior career ===
Valin progressed through the highest levels of the junior structure in his native France. After finishing fourth in the previous year, he won the Minivert 65 class in 2017, victorious in all but four races across the seven round series. In addition, Valin competed in the EMX65 class of the 2017 European Motocross Championship, scoring six points to finish in 21st overall. After moving up to compete on an 85cc motorcycle in 2018, he had an injury it season. Making a comeback at national-level in 2019, he finished 16th in the 85 Espoirs class. Alongside this he finished fourth in the 85 class of the French Supercross Championship, winning both finals at the second round.

During the COVID-19 pandemic-impacted 2020 season, Valin finished second in the Espoirs 85 class behind Sacha Coenen, taking one race win and one overall win. Staying on an 85 for the 2021 season, Valin dominated the Espoirs class, winning four out of six rounds with maximum points scores.

EMX125

Staying with the 737 Performance team, Valin stepped up to compete on a 125cc motorcycle in 2022. Adapting quickly, he finished fourth in the final standings of the Junior 125 class in France, winning the final round of the championship. The team also entered him into EMX125 class of the 2022 European Motocross Championship, finishing 12th in the final standings, with two top-six race finishes. Travelling to the FIM Motocross Junior World Championship, Valin finished sixth in the opening race but did not score in the second race, giving him an overall position of 14th. He represented France at the Motocross of European Nations, forming part of the team that won the event overall. In addition, Valin dominated the Junior 125 class in the French Supercross Championship, winning every final across the three rounds to record a perfect score.

Valin started the 2023 European Motocross Championship by winning the opening round of the EMX125 class, thus becoming the championship leader. After losing the lead at the second round, he would win four more races and two overalls across the rest of the championship, ending as runner-up to Jānis Reišulis. Valin resumed his battle with Reišulis at the FIM Motocross Junior World Championship, staged in Romania, this time gaining the upper hand in the one-off event and being crowned World Champion in the 125 class. In the 2023 French Elite Motocross Championship, Valin recorded a perfect season in the Junior 125 class, winning every race in the seven rounds series.

=== 250 Career ===
EMX250

Valin moved into the EMX250 class for the 2024 European Motocross Championship, leaving the 737 Performance team to join BUD Racing Kawasaki. He was an immediate challenger at the front of the class, winning the second race at the opening round. After a double race win in his native France, Valin took the championship lead from Valerio Lata, before winning three more overall wins and seven race wins to win the title at his first attempt. He combined his European title with winning the Elite MX2 class in the 2024 French Elite Motocross Championship, winning six individual races and three overall rounds.

MX2

After a rapid and successful rise through the EMX ranks, Valin joined Kawasaki's factory team in the MX2 class of the 2025 FIM Motocross World Championship, as the manufacturer returned to the class after a period out. He again adapted to the new class well, finishing fourth in the second race at the opening round. At the following round, Valin sustained a hand injury, which caused him to miss the fourth, fifth and sixth rounds of the championship. Upon his return, he was a consistent figure within the top-ten, with a breakout weekend at the Czech round resulting in Valin winning the Saturday qualifying race and recording his first overall podium. After finishing the season in tenth in the standings, he was called up to represent France at the 2025 Motocross des Nations. In his first appearance at the event, Valin finished eighth in his individual qualifier and recorded a ninth in the first main race, as France finished third overall.

Consistent results across the first four rounds of the 2026 FIM Motocross World Championship were followed by his first podium of the season in Trentino, with third overall. At the following round in his native France, Valin won the qualifying race and again finished third overall. A week later in Germany, Valin took his first race and overall grand prix win on the hard pack track at Teutschenthal. A further podium followed at the Latvian round and after the series resumed following a one week break, Valin won his second qualifying race of the year in Italy. However, one week later in Portugal, Valin had a big crash at the start of the qualifying race, picking up a wrist injury and neck compression that ruled him out for the rest of the season. He returned to represent France at the 2026 Motocross des Nations, held in front of his home crowd. Valin won his qualifying race but in the first main race had a crash down one of the big descents on the Ernée track. After pulling out of that race, he finished eleventh in his second race but with issues facing his team mate Tom Vialle, the French team would finish tenth in the event overall.

== Honours ==
Motocross des Nations

- Team Overall: 2025 (France) (bronze)
- Individual Overall: 2025 MX2 (bronze)

FIM Motocross Junior World Championship

- 125: 2023 (gold)

Motocross of European Nations

- Team Overall: 2022 (France) (gold)

European Motocross Championship

- EMX250: 2024 (gold)
- EMX125: 2023 (silver)

French Elite Motocross Championship

- Elite MX2: 2024 (gold)
- Juniors: 2023 (gold)
- Espoirs: 2021 (gold) , 2020 (silver)

French Supercross Championship

- Junior 125: 2022 (gold)

French Motocross Championship

- Minivert 65: 2017 (gold)

== Career statistics ==
=== Motocross des Nations ===
Year	Location	Nation	Class	Teammates	Team Overall	Individual Overall
2025	(United States) Ironman	FRA	MX2	Romain Febvre; Maxime Renaux	3rd	3rd
2026	(France) Ernée	FRA	MX2	Romain Febvre; Tom Vialle	10th	12th

=== FIM Motocross World Championship ===
==== By season ====
Season	Class	Number	Motorcycle	Team	Race	Race Wins	Overall Wins	Race Top-3	Overall Podium	Pts	Plcd
2025	MX2	317	Kawasaki	Kawasaki Racing Team MXGP	33	0	0	2	1	467	10th
2026	MX2	317	Kawasaki	Kawasaki Racing Team MXGP	18	1	1	6	4	352	12th
Total					51	1	1	8	5	819	

==== Grand Prix wins ====
GP wins
GP-win count	Date	Grand Prix	Place
MX2-class
1	31 May 2026	Germany	Teutschenthal

== MXGP Results ==
Year	Rnd 1	Rnd 2	Rnd 3	Rnd 4	Rnd 5	Rnd 6	Rnd 7	Rnd 8	Rnd 9	Rnd 10	Rnd 11	Rnd 12	Rnd 13	Rnd 14	Rnd 15	Rnd 16	Rnd 17	Rnd 18	Rnd 19	Rnd 20	Average Finish	Podium Percent	Place
2026 MX2	6 ARG (Argentina)	4 AND (Andalusia)	11 SUI (Switzerland)	13 SAR (Sardinia)	3 TRE	3 FRA (France)	1 GER (Germany)	3 LAT (Latvia)	5 ITA (Italy)	OUT POR (Portugal)	OUT RSA (South Africa)	OUT GBR (United Kingdom)	OUT CZE (Czech Republic)	OUT FLA (Flanders)	OUT SWE (Sweden)	OUT NED (Netherlands)	OUT TUR (Turkey)	OUT CHN (China)	OUT AUS (Australia)	-	5.44	44%	12th
