= 2024 French Elite Motocross Championship =

French Motocross Competition in 2024

The 2024 French Elite Motocross Championship season was the 76th French Motocross Championship season.

The series consisted of seven rounds across the country, running from late February to June. Swiss rider Valentin Guillod was the reigning champion in the Elite MX1 class, after winning his first title in 2023. Guillod was unable to defend his title, finishing runner-up to Maxime Desprey, who took his fourth senior French Elite crown.

Pierre Goupillon was the reigning champion in Elite MX2, after he won his third title in a row in 2023. He did not defend his title however, as he moved up to the Elite MX1 class. In his first year in the class, reigning FIM Motocross Junior World Champion Mathis Valin won the Elite MX2 championship .

The opening round of the series, scheduled to take place on 25 February in Lacapelle-Marival was ultimately cancelled due to adverse weather conditions.

== Race calendar and results ==
=== Elite MX1 ===
| Round | Date | Location | Race 1 Winner | Race 2 Winner | Round Winner |
|---|---|---|---|---|---|
| 1 | 25 February | (Occitania) Lacapelle-Marival | Cancelled | | |
| 2 | 17 March | (Normandy) Basly | (France) Maxime Desprey | (France) Maxime Desprey | (France) Maxime Desprey |
| 3 | 31 March | (Occitania) Castelnau-de-Lévis | (France) Maxime Desprey | (France) Gregory Aranda | (France) Maxime Desprey |
| 4 | 21 April | (Brittany) Romagné | (Switzerland) Valentin Guillod | (Norway) Kevin Horgmo | (Switzerland) Valentin Guillod |
| 5 | 5 May | (Grand Est) Bitche | (Belgium) Jeremy Van Horebeek | (France) Bogdan Krajewski | (Belgium) Jeremy Van Horebeek |
| 6 | 26 May | (Bourgogne-Franche-Comté) Villars-sous-Écot | (France) Maxime Desprey | (France) Maxime Desprey | (France) Maxime Desprey |
| 7 | 16 June | (Pays de la Loire) Ernée | (France) Jordi Tixier | (France) Gregory Aranda | (France) Gregory Aranda |

=== Elite MX2 ===
| Round | Date | Location | Race 1 Winner | Race 2 Winner | Round Winner |
|---|---|---|---|---|---|
| 1 | 25 February | (Occitania) Lacapelle-Marival | Cancelled | | |
| 2 | 17 March | (Normandy) Basly | (France) Mathys Boisramé | (France) Mathys Boisramé | (France) Mathys Boisramé |
| 3 | 31 March | (Occitania) Castelnau-de-Lévis | (France) Mathis Valin | (France) Mathys Boisramé | (France) Mathis Valin |
| 4 | 21 April | (Brittany) Romagné | (France) Mathis Valin | (France) Mathis Valin | (France) Mathis Valin |
| 5 | 5 May | (Grand Est) Bitche | (France) Thibault Maupin | (France) Toni Giorgessi | (France) Toni Giorgessi |
| 6 | 26 May | (Bourgogne-Franche-Comté) Villars-sous-Écot | (France) Mathis Valin | (France) Mathys Boisramé | (France) Mathys Boisramé |
| 7 | 16 June | (Pays de la Loire) Ernée | (France) Mathis Valin | (France) Mathis Valin | (France) Mathis Valin |

=== Circuit locations ===
2024 French Elite Motocross Championship locations

== Elite MX1 ==
=== Participants ===
| Team | Constructor | No | Rider | Rounds |
|---|---|---|---|---|
| Team Ship to Cycle Honda Motoblouz SR | Honda | 1 | (Switzerland) Valentin Guillod | 2–4, 6 |
| Team Ship to Cycle Honda Motoblouz SR | Honda | 24 | (Norway) Kevin Horgmo | 2–4, 6 |
| Team Ship to Cycle Honda Motoblouz SR | Honda | 89 | (Belgium) Jeremy Van Horebeek | 5 |
| Yamaha Racing Switzerland | Yamaha | 4 | (Switzerland) Arnaud Tonus | 6 |
| De Baets Yamaha MX Team | Yamaha | 6 | (France) Benoît Paturel | 2 |
| Team LB Racing | KTM | 14 | (France) Arnaud Aubin | 7 |
| Schmicker Racing | KTM | 17 | (Norway) Cornelius Tøndel | 3 |
| Team GSM HBI Dafy Michelin Yamaha | Yamaha | 20 | (France) Gregory Aranda | 2–7 |
| Team GSM HBI Dafy Michelin Yamaha | Yamaha | 72 | (France) Lucas Imbert | 4–7 |
| Team GSM HBI Dafy Michelin Yamaha | Yamaha | 141 | (France) Maxime Desprey | 2–7 |
| Yamaha Auto-Motos Saint-Dizier | Yamaha | 34 | (France) Bogdan Krajewski | 2–7 |
| DAM Racing Gas Gas Benelux | Gas Gas | 46 | (Belgium) Mike Roose | 3 |
| Team Castro MX | Kawasaki | 51 | (Spain) Sergio Castro | 3 |
| KTM Tech 32 Racing | KTM | 57 | (France) Pierre Goupillon | 2–5 |
| Pneu S1 | Yamaha | 61 | (Belgium) Pako Destercq | 2–5 |
| Team Berryli4ni | Gas Gas | 68 | (France) Romain Pape | 4 |
| Team Berryli4ni | Kawasaki | 817 | (France) Jason Clermont | 4 |
| MM85/CBO/Kawasaki Agen | Kawasaki | 85 | (France) Cédric Soubeyras | 5 |
| Team VHR Racing | Gas Gas | 100 | (France) Scotty Verhaeghe | 2–4 |
| Team VHR Racing | Gas Gas | 156 | (France) Maxime Sot | 2, 5–6 |
| | Honda | 109 | (France) Antoine Bordron | 3 |
| | Honda | 117 | (France) Gaetan Pich | 5 |
| Team TMX Competition | Yamaha | 131 | (France) Adrien Malaval | 2–7 |
| KMP Honda Racing powered by Krettek | Honda | 145 | (Germany) Pascal Jungmann | 5 |
| KMP Honda Racing powered by Krettek | Honda | 911 | (France) Jordi Tixier | 3, 5, 7 |
| KTM Metz | KTM | 169 | (France) Victor Krompholtz | 5–7 |
| | KTM | 191 | (France) Nicolas Leblanc | 2 |
| | Honda | 223 | (France) Alexandre Viltard | 2, 4 |
| KMP MX Shop | Honda | 241 | (Germany) Leopold Lichey | 5 |
| | Honda | 243 | (France) Kévin Bouhelier | 6 |
| | Honda | 254 | (France) Raphaël Gouley | 2 |
| Team Cassard | Husqvarna | 256 | (France) Maxence Cassard | 6 |
| Team WID Motorsport | KTM | 258 | (France) Alan Guyot | 4, 7 |
| Team WID Motorsport | KTM | 320 | (France) Dorian Werlé | 4, 7 |
| Team WID Motorsport | KTM | 720 | (France) Ilann Werlé | 4, 7 |
| Team WID Motorsport | KTM | 838 | (France) Raphaël Dauphinot | 7 |
| Andrey Cycle Shop/KTM Switzerland | KTM | 301 | (France) Noah Vampa | 6 |
| Team BHM Racing | Kawasaki | 323 | (France) Nicolas Cottenet | 2 |
| Team BHM Racing | Kawasaki | 758 | (France) Raffaël Blond | 2, 4 |
| | KTM | 328 | (France) Enzo Douaud | 4 |
| | Honda | 338 | (France) David Herbreteau | 4 |
| | KTM | 348 | (France) Remy Amand | 6 |
| | KTM | 364 | (France) Logan Huguenote | 6 |
| | KTM | 390 | (France) Eliott Lambert | 4 |
| | Honda | 400 | (France) Florent Becker | 5 |
| | Kawasaki | 407 | (France) Enzo Solo | 2 |
| | Honda | 410 | (France) Vincent Corre | 4 |
| | Honda | 433 | (France) Gregory Puech | 3 |
| Yamaha Motor Schweiz | Yamaha | 453 | (Switzerland) Flavio Wolf | 5 |
| | Honda | 454 | (France) Steven Gougeon | 7 |
| | Honda | 475 | (France) Maxime Maille | 5 |
| KTM Metz | KTM | 504 | (France) Damien Sanzey | 5–6 |
| | KTM | 530 | (France) Anthony Blanchet | 7 |
| 2F MX VPS Développement | Yamaha | 533 | (France) Tom Provost | 4 |
| JDM Motos | Husqvarna | 544 | (France) Quentin Boudot | 6 |
| Team MX 85 | KTM | 546 | (France) Victor Legeard | 4, 7 |
| Motoland Amiens | KTM | 577 | (France) Antonin Léonard | 2 |
| | Fantic | 648 | (France) Jordan Robidou | 4 |
| Honda France | Honda | 700 | (Netherlands) Lars van Berkel | 5 |
| B.R. Motos Husqvarna | Husqvarna | 709 | (Spain) Nil Bussot | 3 |
| HotMotorbike Gas Gas | Gas Gas | 710 | (Belgium) Adrien Wagener | 2–3 |
| Floride Moto/GVP Marseille | Kawasaki | 725 | (France) Antonin Mille | 2–7 |
| Krismotos Challans | Yamaha | 752 | (France) Julien Pelletier | 2, 4, 6–7 |
| GCC Swiss Racing Team | Husqvarna | 760 | (Switzerland) Nicolas Bender | 5 |
| Espace Aubade/GBMX | KTM | 766 | (France) Jimmy Noirot | 6 |
| | Honda | 804 | (France) Samuel Lecossier | 4 |
| | KTM | 811 | (France) Enzo Gregori Garrido | 6 |
| JB Racing Team | Gas Gas | 831 | (France) Brice Maylin | 2–6 |
| RFK Racing | Honda | 844 | (France) Quentin Sans | 3 |
| | Honda | 858 | (France) Tom Petithory | 3–4, 6–7 |
| | KTM | 877 | (France) Guillaume Pouget | 7 |
| KTM Faktory | KTM | 940 | (France) Antoine Cossé | 2–4, 6 |
| Auto Motos Saint Dizier | Yamaha | 946 | (Belgium) Daymond Martens | 5 |
| | Yamaha | 971 | (France) Tino Basso | 7 |
| | KTM | 995 | (France) Luidji Couvert | 7 |

=== Riders Championship ===
Points are awarded to finishers of the main races, in the following format:

| Position | 1st | 2nd | 3rd | 4th | 5th | 6th | 7th | 8th | 9th | 10th | 11th | 12th | 13th | 14th | 15th | 16th | 17th | 18th | 19th | 20th |
| Points | 25 | 22 | 20 | 18 | 16 | 15 | 14 | 13 | 12 | 11 | 10 | 9 | 8 | 7 | 6 | 5 | 4 | 3 | 2 | 1 |

| Pos | Rider | Bike | BAS (Normandy) | | CAS (Occitania) | | ROM (Brittany) | | BIT (Grand Est) | | VIL (Bourgogne-Franche-Comté) | | ERN (Pays de la Loire) | | Points |
|---|---|---|---|---|---|---|---|---|---|---|---|---|---|---|---|
| 1 | (France) Maxime Desprey | Yamaha | 1 | 1 | 1 | 2 | 2 | 6 | 2 | 3 | 1 | 1 | 3 | 7 | 260 |
| 2 | (Switzerland) Valentin Guillod | Honda | 3 | 2 | 2 | 3 | 1 | 3 | | | 4 | 3 | | | 251 |
| 3 | (France) Gregory Aranda | Yamaha | 2 | 4 | 5 | 1 | 3 | 2 | 4 | 5 | 2 | 2 | 2 | 1 | 248 |
| 4 | (Norway) Kevin Horgmo | Honda | 5 | 3 | 8 | 5 | 5 | 1 | | | 3 | 4 | | | 216 |
| 5 | (France) Adrien Malaval | Yamaha | 10 | 8 | 7 | 7 | 4 | 4 | 6 | 11 | 6 | 5 | 4 | 3 | 182 |
| 6 | (France) Bogdan Krajewski | Yamaha | 4 | 10 | 11 | 11 | 9 | 8 | 11 | 1 | 8 | 7 | 6 | 5 | 167 |
| 7 | (France) Pierre Goupillon | KTM | 6 | 7 | 4 | 6 | 7 | 5 | 3 | 4 | | | | | 130 |
| 8 | (France) Brice Maylin | Gas Gas | 7 | 6 | 6 | 8 | Ret | 10 | 8 | 10 | 7 | 19 | | | 108 |
| 9 | (France) Lucas Imbert | Yamaha | | | | | 11 | 11 | 19 | 7 | 10 | 8 | 5 | 4 | 94 |
| 10 | (France) Antonin Mille | Kawasaki | 16 | 17 | 18 | 12 | 12 | 14 | 13 | DNS | 11 | 9 | 9 | 9 | 91 |
| 11 | (France) Jordi Tixier | Honda | | | 3 | 4 | | | 20 | DNS | | | 1 | 2 | 86 |
| 12 | (France) Antoine Cossé | KTM | 9 | 9 | 9 | 9 | 10 | 9 | | | 9 | Ret | | | 83 |
| 13 | (France) Julien Pelletier | Yamaha | 14 | 12 | | | 14 | 15 | | | 12 | 10 | 8 | 8 | 75 |
| 14 | (Belgium) Jeremy Van Horebeek | Honda | | | | | | | 1 | 2 | | | | | 47 |
| 15 | (France) Scotty Verhaeghe | Gas Gas | 11 | 11 | 10 | 10 | DNS | DNS | | | | | | | 42 |
| 16 | (France) Tom Petithory | Honda | | | 15 | 15 | 21 | 25 | | | 16 | 16 | 13 | 13 | 38 |
| 17 | (France) Maxime Sot | Gas Gas | 15 | 13 | | | | | 10 | DNS | 20 | 11 | | | 36 |
| 18 | (Belgium) Pako Destercq | Yamaha | 13 | 15 | 12 | 13 | Ret | 17 | DNS | DNS | | | | | 35 |
| 19 | (France) Raffaël Blond | Kawasaki | 12 | 14 | | | 13 | 13 | | | | | | | 32 |
| 20 | (Switzerland) Arnaud Tonus | Yamaha | | | | | | | | | 5 | 6 | | | 31 |
| 21 | (France) Cédric Soubeyras | Kawasaki | | | | | | | 5 | 8 | | | | | 29 |
| 22 | (France) Benoît Paturel | Yamaha | 8 | 5 | | | | | | | | | | | 29 |
| 23 | (France) Arnaud Aubin | KTM | | | | | | | | | | | 7 | 6 | 29 |
| 24 | (France) Romain Pape | Gas Gas | | | | | 6 | 7 | | | | | | | 29 |
| 25 | (Netherlands) Lars van Berkel | Honda | | | | | | | 9 | 6 | | | | | 27 |
| 26 | (Belgium) Daymond Martens | Yamaha | | | | | | | 7 | 9 | | | | | 26 |
| 27 | (Belgium) Adrien Wagener | Gas Gas | 17 | 16 | 14 | 14 | | | | | | | | | 23 |
| 28 | (France) Jason Clermont | Kawasaki | | | | | 8 | 12 | | | | | | | 22 |
| 29 | (France) Tino Basso | Yamaha | | | | | | | | | | | 10 | 10 | 22 |
| 30 | (France) Raphaël Dauphinot | KTM | | | | | | | | | | | 11 | 11 | 20 |
| 31 | (Switzerland) Nicolas Bender | Husqvarna | | | | | | | 12 | 12 | | | | | 18 |
| 32 | (France) Quentin Boudot | Husqvarna | | | | | | | | | 13 | 12 | | | 17 |
| 33 | (France) Victor Krompholtz | KTM | | | | | | | 18 | DNS | 19 | 18 | 17 | 17 | 16 |
| 34 | (France) Maxime Maille | Honda | | | | | | | 14 | 13 | | | | | 15 |
| 35 | (France) Damien Sanzey | KTM | | | | | | | DNS | DNS | 14 | 14 | | | 14 |
| 36 | (France) Alexandre Viltard | Honda | 18 | 18 | | | 16 | 18 | | | | | | | 14 |
| 37 | (France) Guillaume Pouget | KTM | | | | | | | | | | | 15 | 14 | 13 |
| 38 | (France) Alan Guyot | KTM | | | | | 23 | 26 | | | | | 14 | 15 | 13 |
| 39 | (France) Florent Becker | KTM | | | | | | | 15 | 14 | | | | | 13 |
| 40 | (France) Ilann Werlé | KTM | | | | | 18 | 21 | | | | | 12 | DNS | 12 |
| 41 | (France) Kévin Bouhelier | Honda | | | | | | | | | 15 | 15 | | | 12 |
| 42 | (France) Quentin Sans | Honda | | | 13 | 18 | | | | | | | | | 11 |
| 43 | (France) David Herbreteau | Honda | | | | | 15 | 16 | | | | | | | 11 |
| 44 | (France) Victor Legeard | KTM | | | | | 20 | 22 | | | | | Ret | 12 | 10 |
| 45 | (France) Gaetan Pich | Honda | | | | | | | 17 | 15 | | | | | 10 |
| 46 | (France) Luidji Couvert | KTM | | | | | | | | | | | 16 | 16 | 10 |
| 47 | (France) Antoine Bordron | Honda | | | 16 | 16 | | | | | | | | | 10 |
| 48 | (France) Enzo Gregori Garrido | KTM | | | | | | | | | Ret | 13 | | | 8 |
| 49 | (France) Logan Huguenote | KTM | | | | | | | | | 17 | 17 | | | 8 |
| 50 | (France) Gregory Puech | Honda | | | 17 | 17 | | | | | | | | | 8 |
| 51 | (France) Dorian Werlé | KTM | | | | | 17 | 19 | | | | | 20 | DNS | 7 |
| 52 | (Switzerland) Flavio Wolf | Yamaha | | | | | | | 16 | DNS | | | | | 5 |
| 53 | (France) Steven Gougeon | Honda | | | | | | | | | | | 19 | 18 | 5 |
| 54 | (France) Remy Amand | KTM | | | | | | | | | 18 | 20 | | | 4 |
| 55 | (France) Anthony Blanchet | KTM | | | | | | | | | | | 18 | DNS | 3 |
| 56 | (France) Antonin Léonard | KTM | 19 | 20 | | | | | | | | | | | 3 |
| 57 | (France) Samuel Lecossier | Honda | | | | | 19 | 24 | | | | | | | 3 |
| 58 | (France) Nicolas Cottenet | Kawasaki | Ret | 19 | | | | | | | | | | | 2 |
| 59 | (France) Enzo Douaud | KTM | | | | | Ret | 20 | | | | | | | 1 |
| 60 | (France) Nicolas Leblanc | KTM | 20 | 22 | | | | | | | | | | | 1 |
| | (France) Raphaël Gouley | Honda | 21 | 23 | | | | | | | | | | | 0 |
| | (France) Enzo Solo | Kawasaki | Ret | 21 | | | | | | | | | | | 0 |
| | (France) Jordan Robidou | Fantic | | | | | 22 | 23 | | | | | | | 0 |
| | (France) Vincent Corre | Honda | | | | | Ret | DNS | | | | | | | 0 |
| | (France) Maxence Cassard | Husqvarna | | | | | | | | | Ret | DNS | | | 0 |
| | (France) Jimmy Noirot | KTM | | | | | | | | | Ret | DNS | | | 0 |
| | (France) Noah Vampa | KTM | | | | | | | | | Ret | DNS | | | 0 |
| | (France) Tom Provost | Yamaha | | | | | DNS | DNS | | | | | | | 0 |
| | (France) Eliott Lambert | KTM | | | | | DNS | DNS | | | | | | | 0 |
| | (Germany) Pascal Jungmann | Honda | | | | | | | DNS | DNS | | | | | 0 |
| | (Germany) Leopold Lichey | Honda | | | | | | | DNS | DNS | | | | | 0 |
Riders not eligible to score championship points
| | (Spain) Sergio Castro | Kawasaki | | | 14 | 12 | | | | | | | | | 0 |
| | (Spain) Nil Bussot | Husqvarna | | | 13 | 14 | | | | | | | | | 0 |
| | (Belgium) Mike Roose | Gas Gas | | | 20 | 16 | | | | | | | | | 0 |
| | (Norway) Cornelius Tøndel | KTM | | | Ret | DNS | | | | | | | | | 0 |
| Pos | Rider | Bike | BAS (Normandy) | | CAS (Occitania) | | ROM (Brittany) | | BIT (Grand Est) | | VIL (Bourgogne-Franche-Comté) | | ERN (Pays de la Loire) | | Points |

== Elite MX2 ==
=== Participants ===
| Team | Constructor | No | Rider | Rounds |
|---|---|---|---|---|
| Team TMX Competition | KTM | 11 | (France) Calvin Fonvieille | 2–7 |
| Team TMX Competition | Yamaha | 389 | (France) Jules Pietre | 2–6 |
| Team TMX Competition | Yamaha | 751 | (France) Germain Jamet | 4–6 |
| | KTM | 14 | (France) Arnaud Aubin | 2–5 |
| | KTM | 19 | (France) Sacha Chauviré | 4 |
| 737 Performance Gas Gas | Gas Gas | 31 | (France) Tom Guyon | 2–5, 7 |
| Team MB MX School | Husqvarna | 41 | (France) Nicolas Duhamel | 2–7 |
| Team MB MX School | Husqvarna | 172 | (France) Mathys Boisramé | 2–7 |
| Team VRT Yamaha Racing | Yamaha | 47 | (Latvia) Kārlis Reišulis | 2, 4 |
| Team VRT Yamaha Racing | Yamaha | 430 | (Netherlands) Ivano van Erp | 2, 4 |
| Team VRT Yamaha Racing | Yamaha | 772 | (Latvia) Jānis Reišulis | 2 |
| Team New Bike Yamaha | Yamaha | 55 | (France) Mathis Barthez | 2–6 |
| Team New Bike Yamaha | Yamaha | 259 | (France) Julien Lebeau | 2–4 |
| Team New Bike Yamaha | Yamaha | 274 | (Belgium) Amandine Verstappen | 2, 4 |
| Team VHR Racing | Gas Gas | 83 | (France) Maxime Grau | 2–3 |
| Team VHR Racing | Gas Gas | 144 | (France) Mathilde Martinez | 2 |
| Team Ride Innovation Development | Husqvarna | 95 | (France) Enzo Casat | 2–7 |
| Team Ride Innovation Development | Husqvarna | 166 | (France) Loan Bourroumana | 3 |
| DJ1 | KTM | 97 | (France) Dorian Juin | 2, 4 |
| | KTM | 104 | (France) Mickael Jamshidi | 5 |
| Chave Motos | Honda | 113 | (France) Enzo Dubois | 6 |
| Team OB1 Motorsport | Husqvarna | 118 | (France) Nicolas Aubin | 2 |
| Hall de la Moto Brest | Honda | 122 | (France) Julien Duhamel | 4, 7 |
| | Yamaha | 130 | (France) Leo Lecuyer | 2 |
| Team Dafy Dunlop Wonderbike | Honda | 133 | (France) Tom Caneele | 2–6 |
| Lucchini Motos Honda | Honda | 158 | (France) Jean-Mathieu Lucchini | 3 |
| Team LB Racing | Husqvarna | 194 | (France) Florian Bertin | 2, 4 |
| | Honda | 202 | (France) Corentin Normand | 6 |
| Triumph Lausanne | Triumph | 208 | (France) Axel Billottet | 6 |
| | KTM | 211 | (France) Kevin Vandeleene | 3 |
| Team GT Racing | KTM | 217 | (France) Jean-Paul Piacentini | 3 |
| Team GT Racing | KTM | 287 | (France) Lisandru Torre | 3 |
| Team Giorgio | Gas Gas | 220 | (France) Toni Giorgessi | 2–7 |
| | Honda | 226 | (Switzerland) Arthur Steffen | 4–6 |
| Kuttler Motos KTM | KTM | 228 | (France) Florian Schertzinger | 6 |
| | Honda | 232 | (France) Constant Zordan | 6 |
| TMX Powersport | Yamaha | 233 | (France) Oscar Ciret | 2 |
| | KTM | 235 | (France) Théo Marchand | 2 |
| | Husqvarna | 240 | (France) Johan Briand | 2, 4 |
| | Yamaha | 242 | (France) Tristan Mayzou | 3 |
| | KTM | 255 | (France) Fabio Fenouillet | 3 |
| Pro Factory Racing Team | Honda | 264 | (France) Diego Haution | 3 |
| Motoland Amiens/Tip Top Competition | Yamaha | 268 | (France) Thibault Maupin | 2–7 |
| | Yamaha | 269 | (France) Sacha de Monmahou | 6 |
| | Yamaha | 270 | (France) Matthis James | 2 |
| | Yamaha | 280 | (France) Jimmy van Walleghem | 2 |
| Team MXStart The Shop Competition | Honda | 312 | (France) Matheo Albarello | 3 |
| BUD Racing Kawasaki | Kawasaki | 317 | (France) Mathis Valin | 2–4, 6–7 |
| BUD Racing Kawasaki | Kawasaki | 339 | (Chile) Benjamín Garib | 2–4, 6–7 |
| Team CRC Motostyl Husqvarna | Husqvarna | 324 | (France) Maxime Charlier | 2–3 |
| | Honda | 344 | (France) Enzo Vilet | 7 |
| | Yamaha | 346 | (France) Alex Dietre | 6 |
| JSL 83 Kawasaki Toulon | Kawasaki | 371 | (France) Paolo Maschio | 2–3, 7 |
| Motocross Sainte Austreberthe | KTM | 398 | (France) Josselin Mioque | 7 |
| KMP Honda Racing powered by Krettek | Honda | 408 | (Netherlands) Scott Smulders | 5 |
| Team FourOneOne Suzuki France | Suzuki | 411 | (France) Nicolas Dercourt | 2–7 |
| | Yamaha | 426 | (Belgium) Tias Callens | 5–7 |
| | Honda | 434 | (France) Chad De Clercq | 5 |
| | Husqvarna | 442 | (France) Théo Ragot | 6 |
| Yamaha Motor France | Yamaha | 446 | (France) Adrien Petit | 2–7 |
| Osička MX Team | KTM | 451 | (Czech Republic) Julius Mikula | 4 |
| MR Motorsport Academy | KTM | 471 | (France) Elwan Van de Wouw | 2–6 |
| Cap Motos 25 | KTM | 485 | (France) Alexis Schmitt | 6 |
| RC Motorsport | Husqvarna | 496 | (France) Romain Seranon | 6 |
| FB Factory Motorsport | Husqvarna | 505 | (France) Dorian Koch | 3 |
| FB Factory Motorsport | Husqvarna | 598 | (New Caledonia) Ethan Lepigeon | 2, 4 |
| FB Factory Motorsport | Husqvarna | 965 | (France) Hugo Manzato | 3 |
| AGMX Racing | Honda | 510 | (Switzerland) Luca Diserens | 4, 6 |
| | Kawasaki | 523 | (France) Pierre Colin | 5 |
| Dafy Moto St Quentin | Gas Gas | 527 | (France) Evan Demeester | 5–7 |
| | Yamaha | 558 | (France) Enzo Audouy-Schneider | 3 |
| | Yamaha | 571 | (France) Matéo Bouly | 2, 4 |
| | TM | 575 | (France) Kevan Schillinger | 5 |
| WRT Globex | KTM | 589 | (France) Kiliann Poll | 2–6 |
| MoTec Zweirad GmbH | Kawasaki | 594 | (France) Léo Buttet | 6 |
| MoTec Zweirad GmbH | Kawasaki | 857 | (France) Hugo Vauthier | 2, 6 |
| KTM Nordic Keljon Konehuolto FI | KTM | 596 | (Finland) Eliel Lehtinen | 3 |
| HR Team | KTM | 597 | (France) Alan Harnois | 4 |
| | Fantic | 619 | (France) Hugo Stiennes | 2, 4–6 |
| | Honda | 638 | (France) Mateo Chastel | 4, 7 |
| | Gas Gas | 642 | (France) Jules Ammer | 2–7 |
| 101 Team | Gas Gas | 701 | (France) Martin Outrequin | 2 |
| JB Racing Team | KTM | 708 | (France) Kivers Lefebvre | 2, 5–6 |
| | Honda | 712 | (France) Pierrick Castan | 3, 6–7 |
| SM Action Fantic Racing Team | Fantic | 717 | (France) Alexis Fueri | 6 |
| TCL Bossi Motorsport | Husqvarna | 726 | (France) Loïc Kiffer | 6 |
| | Kawasaki | 747 | (France) Maximin Mille | 2–7 |
| MotoTeam81 | Yamaha | 749 | (France) Julian Blanc | 3 |
| | Suzuki | 761 | (France) Marvyn Vigny | 3 |
| | KTM | 780 | (France) Zachary Pervier | 4, 7 |
| Team FR25 Honda | Honda | 790 | (France) Victor Mauresa | 2–3, 6 |
| | Fantic | 796 | (France) Remy Anger | 4, 7 |
| | Gas Gas | 800 | (France) Maxime Simon | 6 |
| | KTM | 840 | (France) Léandre Chauviré | 4 |
| | KTM | 851 | (France) Clément Briatte | 3–4 |
| | KTM | 861 | (France) Etienne Vignon | 6 |
| Auto Motos Saint Dizier | Yamaha | 879 | (France) Edgard Moncel | 5 |
| T Tec Moto | KTM | 883 | (France) Loric Liegeois | 5 |
| | KTM | 884 | (France) Leo Bordini | 2, 4, 7 |
| | KTM | 895 | (France) François Rigollot | 2, 5 |
| Minisini Construction/Kuttler Motos | KTM | 908 | (France) Esteban Minisini | 6 |
| TCP Racing 83 | Fantic | 919 | (France) Loris Rebuttini | 6 |
| | Gas Gas | 923 | (France) Michaël Bridier | 2, 7 |
| | Gas Gas | 928 | (France) Julien Couvat | 6 |
| LF Motorsport | Fantic | 934 | (France) Marc Pardonnet | 6 |
| | Kawasaki | 937 | (France) Jean Collignon | 5–6 |
| | Yamaha | 942 | (France) Kévin Bulfet | 6 |
| | Husqvarna | 951 | (France) Steven Baltenweck | 6 |
| LMX Racing | Honda | 952 | (France) Ludovic Macler | 5 |
| | Honda | 955 | (France) Lilian Henry | 4–5 |
| GCC Swiss Racing Team | Husqvarna | 983 | (France) Alex Acquistapace | 5 |
| | KTM | 992 | (France) Esteban Douaud | 2, 4 |

=== Riders Championship ===
Points are awarded to finishers of the main races, in the following format:

| Position | 1st | 2nd | 3rd | 4th | 5th | 6th | 7th | 8th | 9th | 10th | 11th | 12th | 13th | 14th | 15th | 16th | 17th | 18th | 19th | 20th |
| Points | 25 | 22 | 20 | 18 | 16 | 15 | 14 | 13 | 12 | 11 | 10 | 9 | 8 | 7 | 6 | 5 | 4 | 3 | 2 | 1 |

| Pos | Rider | Bike | BAS (Normandy) | | CAS (Occitania) | | ROM (Brittany) | | BIT (Grand Est) | | VIL (Bourgogne-Franche-Comté) | | ERN (Pays de la Loire) | | Points |
|---|---|---|---|---|---|---|---|---|---|---|---|---|---|---|---|
| 1 | (France) Mathis Valin | Kawasaki | 12 | 2 | 1 | 4 | 1 | 1 | | | 1 | 2 | 1 | 1 | 265 |
| 2 | (France) Mathys Boisramé | Husqvarna | 1 | 1 | 6 | 1 | 7 | 6 | 7 | 3 | 2 | 1 | 2 | 2 | 244 |
| 3 | (France) Thibault Maupin | Yamaha | 4 | 11 | 12 | 8 | 6 | 8 | 1 | 4 | 7 | 4 | 4 | 7 | 185 |
| 4 | (France) Adrien Petit | Yamaha | 3 | 7 | 5 | 7 | 4 | DNS | 17 | 2 | 5 | 3 | 6 | 5 | 175 |
| 5 | (Chile) Benjamín Garib | Kawasaki | 8 | 3 | 2 | 3 | 3 | 5 | | | 6 | 7 | 7 | 4 | 172 |
| 6 | (France) Tom Guyon | Gas Gas | 5 | 4 | 13 | 2 | 5 | 3 | 6 | 9 | | | 5 | 3 | 163 |
| 7 | (France) Calvin Fonvieille | KTM | 11 | 25 | 3 | 6 | 13 | 17 | 5 | 8 | 4 | 8 | 3 | 6 | 152 |
| 8 | (France) Toni Giorgessi | Gas Gas | 25 | 16 | 15 | 13 | 8 | 7 | 2 | 1 | 9 | 14 | 9 | 8 | 137 |
| 9 | (France) Nicolas Dercourt | Suzuki | 14 | 10 | 7 | 9 | Ret | 11 | 4 | 5 | 11 | 11 | Ret | DNS | 108 |
| 10 | (France) Kiliann Poll | KTM | 21 | 18 | 10 | 15 | 14 | 10 | 10 | 14 | 8 | 6 | | | 84 |
| 11 | (France) Nicolas Duhamel | Husqvarna | 15 | 12 | 33 | 14 | 11 | 9 | Ret | DNS | 12 | 12 | 10 | 17 | 77 |
| 12 | (France) Mathis Barthez | Yamaha | 16 | 15 | 16 | 10 | 17 | 19 | 16 | 6 | 10 | 9 | | | 76 |
| 13 | (France) Jules Pietre | Yamaha | 26 | 17 | 4 | 5 | 16 | 12 | Ret | DNS | 13 | 10 | | | 71 |
| 14 | (Latvia) Kārlis Reišulis | Yamaha | 7 | 5 | | | 12 | 4 | | | | | | | 57 |
| 15 | (France) Arnaud Aubin | KTM | 18 | 14 | 9 | 11 | 10 | 16 | DNS | DNS | | | | | 48 |
| 16 | (France) Maxime Charlier | Husqvarna | 6 | 13 | 8 | 12 | | | | | | | | | 45 |
| 17 | (Czech Republic) Julius Mikula | KTM | | | | | 2 | 2 | | | | | | | 44 |
| 18 | (Belgium) Tias Callens | Yamaha | | | | | | | 8 | 11 | 28 | 25 | 11 | 12 | 42 |
| 19 | (Netherlands) Ivano van Erp | Yamaha | 10 | 9 | | | 9 | 14 | | | | | | | 42 |
| 20 | (France) Julien Duhamel | Honda | | | | | 15 | 13 | | | | | 8 | 9 | 39 |
| 21 | (France) Maxime Grau | Gas Gas | 2 | 8 | Ret | 18 | | | | | | | | | 38 |
| 22 | (France) Alexis Fueri | Fantic | | | | | | | | | 3 | 5 | | | 36 |
| 23 | (Netherlands) Scott Smulders | Honda | | | | | | | 3 | 7 | | | | | 34 |
| 24 | (France) Pierrick Castan | Honda | | | 25 | 22 | | | | | 15 | 15 | 12 | 11 | 31 |
| 25 | (Latvia) Jānis Reišulis | Yamaha | 9 | 6 | | | | | | | | | | | 27 |
| 26 | (France) Julien Lebeau | Yamaha | 13 | 21 | 14 | 17 | 19 | 15 | | | | | | | 27 |
| 27 | (France) Maximin Mille | Kawasaki | 31 | Ret | 21 | Ret | 27 | 28 | Ret | 13 | 30 | 29 | 13 | 14 | 23 |
| 28 | (France) Tom Caneele | Honda | 29 | 30 | 27 | 26 | 20 | 21 | 11 | 15 | 16 | 26 | | | 22 |
| 29 | (Switzerland) Arthur Steffen | Honda | | | | | 18 | 20 | 13 | 17 | 17 | 20 | | | 21 |
| 30 | (France) Hugo Stiennes | Fantic | 30 | 28 | | | 21 | 22 | 12 | 12 | 27 | 28 | | | 18 |
| 31 | (France) Mateo Chastel | Honda | | | | | 28 | Ret | | | | | 15 | 10 | 17 |
| 32 | (France) Alex Acquistapace | Husqvarna | | | | | | | 9 | 19 | | | | | 14 |
| 33 | (France) Lilian Henry | Honda | | | | | DNQ | DNQ | 18 | 10 | | | | | 14 |
| 34 | (France) Paolo Maschio | Kawasaki | 23 | 20 | 11 | 19 | | | | | | | DNS | DNS | 13 |
| 35 | (France) Remy Anger | Fantic | | | | | DNQ | DNQ | | | | | 16 | 13 | 13 |
| 36 | (France) Alexis Schmitt | KTM | | | | | | | | | 18 | 13 | | | 11 |
| 37 | (Switzerland) Luca Diserens | Honda | | | | | Ret | Ret | | | 14 | 17 | | | 11 |
| 38 | (France) Edgard Moncel | Yamaha | | | | | | | 14 | 18 | | | | | 10 |
| 39 | (France) Jules Ammer | Gas Gas | 35 | 29 | 29 | 33 | 33 | 31 | Ret | 16 | 35 | 30 | Ret | 16 | 10 |
| 40 | (France) Hugo Vauthier | Kawasaki | 19 | 19 | | | | | | | 20 | 16 | | | 10 |
| 41 | (France) Diego Haution | Honda | | | 17 | 16 | | | | | | | | | 9 |
| 42 | (France) Evan Demeester | Gas Gas | | | | | | | Ret | 20 | 32 | 32 | 17 | 18 | 8 |
| 43 | (France) Enzo Casat | Husqvarna | Ret | 32 | 22 | 29 | 30 | Ret | Ret | DNS | 29 | Ret | 14 | Ret | 7 |
| 44 | (France) Leo Bordini | KTM | DNQ | DNQ | | | DNQ | DNQ | | | | | Ret | 15 | 6 |
| 45 | (France) Kevan Schillinger | TM | | | | | | | 15 | 21 | | | | | 6 |
| 46 | (France) Zachary Pervier | KTM | | | | | DNQ | DNQ | | | | | 18 | 19 | 5 |
| 47 | (France) Victor Mauresa | Honda | 24 | 24 | 19 | 21 | | | | | 21 | 18 | | | 5 |
| 48 | (France) Nicolas Aubin | Husqvarna | 17 | Ret | | | | | | | | | | | 4 |
| 49 | (New Caledonia) Ethan Lepigeon | Husqvarna | 32 | 33 | | | 25 | 18 | | | | | | | 3 |
| 50 | (France) Hugo Manzato | Husqvarna | | | 18 | Ret | | | | | | | | | 3 |
| 51 | (France) Michaël Bridier | Gas Gas | DNQ | DNQ | | | | | | | | | 19 | 20 | 3 |
| 52 | (France) Julien Couvat | Gas Gas | | | | | | | | | Ret | 19 | | | 2 |
| 53 | (France) Axel Billottet | Triumph | | | | | | | | | 19 | 21 | | | 2 |
| 54 | (France) Pierre Colin | Kawasaki | | | | | | | 19 | DNS | | | | | 2 |
| 55 | (France) Elwan Van de Wouw | KTM | 36 | 22 | 23 | 20 | Ret | 27 | 20 | DNS | 26 | 22 | | | 2 |
| 56 | (France) Enzo Vilet | Gas Gas | | | | | | | | | | | 20 | DNS | 1 |
| 57 | (France) Dorian Koch | Husqvarna | | | 20 | 24 | | | | | | | | | 1 |
| 58 | (France) Matéo Bouly | Yamaha | 20 | DSQ | | | 29 | 26 | | | | | | | 1 |
| | (France) Johan Briand | Husqvarna | 22 | 23 | | | DNS | Ret | | | | | | | 0 |
| | (France) Léo Buttet | Kawasaki | | | | | | | | | 22 | 27 | | | 0 |
| | (France) Alan Harnois | KTM | | | | | 22 | 30 | | | | | | | 0 |
| | (France) Clément Briatte | KTM | | | 26 | 36 | 23 | 23 | | | | | | | 0 |
| | (France) Fabio Fenouillet | KTM | | | 24 | 23 | | | | | | | | | 0 |
| | (France) Enzo Dubois | Honda | | | | | | | | | 25 | 23 | | | 0 |
| | (France) Romain Seranon | Husqvarna | | | | | | | | | 23 | Ret | | | 0 |
| | (France) Florian Bertin | Husqvarna | 28 | Ret | | | 24 | 24 | | | | | | | 0 |
| | (France) Loris Rebuttini | Fantic | | | | | | | | | 24 | 24 | | | 0 |
| | (France) Esteban Douaud | KTM | 27 | 27 | | | 26 | 25 | | | | | | | 0 |
| | (France) Jean-Paul Piacentini | KTM | | | 28 | 25 | | | | | | | | | 0 |
| | (France) François Rigollot | KTM | Ret | 26 | | | | | DNS | DNS | | | | | 0 |
| | (France) Loan Bourroumana | Husqvarna | | | 35 | 27 | | | | | | | | | 0 |
| | (Finland) Eliel Lehtinen | KTM | | | 30 | 28 | | | | | | | | | 0 |
| | (France) Dorian Juin | KTM | 34 | Ret | | | Ret | 29 | | | | | | | 0 |
| | (France) Julien Blanc | Yamaha | | | 31 | 30 | | | | | | | | | 0 |
| | (France) Loïc Kiffer | Husqvarna | | | | | | | | | 31 | 31 | | | 0 |
| | (France) Léandre Chauviré | KTM | | | | | 31 | 32 | | | | | | | 0 |
| | (France) Martin Outrequin | Gas Gas | 33 | 31 | | | | | | | | | | | 0 |
| | (France) Matheo Albarello | Honda | | | 34 | 31 | | | | | | | | | 0 |
| | (Belgium) Amandine Verstappen | Yamaha | DNQ | DNQ | | | 32 | 34 | | | | | | | 0 |
| | (France) Enzo Audouy-Schneider | Yamaha | | | 37 | 32 | | | | | | | | | 0 |
| | (France) Kevin Vandeleene | KTM | | | 32 | Ret | | | | | | | | | 0 |
| | (France) Sacha Chauviré | KTM | | | | | 34 | 33 | | | | | | | 0 |
| | (France) Constant Zordan | Honda | | | | | | | | | 33 | 34 | | | 0 |
| | (France) Esteban Minisini | KTM | | | | | | | | | 34 | 33 | | | 0 |
| | (France) Tristan Mayzou | Yamaha | | | 36 | 34 | | | | | | | | | 0 |
| | (France) Léo Lecuyer | Yamaha | Ret | 34 | | | | | | | | | | | 0 |
| | (France) Marvyn Vigny | Suzuki | | | 38 | 35 | | | | | | | | | 0 |
| | (France) Kivers Lefebvre | KTM | Ret | Ret | | | | | Ret | DNS | Ret | DNS | | | 0 |
| | (France) Germain Jamet | Yamaha | | | | | Ret | DNS | Ret | DNS | Ret | DNS | | | 0 |
| | (France) Lisandru Torre | KTM | | | Ret | Ret | | | | | | | | | 0 |
| | (France) Chad De Clercq | Gas Gas | | | | | | | Ret | DNS | | | | | 0 |
| | (France) Ludovic Macler | Kawasaki | | | | | | | Ret | DNS | | | | | 0 |
| | (France) Mickael Jamshidi | KTM | | | | | | | Ret | DNS | | | | | 0 |
| | (France) Marc Pardonnet | Fantic | | | | | | | | | Ret | DNS | | | 0 |
| | (France) Josselin Mioque | KTM | | | | | | | | | | | Ret | DNS | 0 |
| | (France) Jean Collignon | Kawasaki | | | | | | | DNS | DNS | DNQ | DNQ | | | 0 |
| | (France) Loric Liegeois | KTM | | | | | | | DNS | DNS | | | | | 0 |
| | (France) Kévin Bulfet | Yamaha | | | | | | | | | DNS | DNS | | | 0 |
| | (France) Mathilde Martinez | KTM | DNQ | DNQ | | | | | | | | | | | 0 |
| | (France) Oscar Ciret | Yamaha | DNQ | DNQ | | | | | | | | | | | 0 |
| | (France) Matthis James | Yamaha | DNQ | DNQ | | | | | | | | | | | 0 |
| | (France) Théo Marchand | KTM | DNQ | DNQ | | | | | | | | | | | 0 |
| | (France) Jimmy van Walleghem | Yamaha | DNQ | DNQ | | | | | | | | | | | 0 |
| | (France) Jean-Mathieu Lucchini | Honda | | | DNQ | DNQ | | | | | | | | | 0 |
| | (France) Alex Dietre | Yamaha | | | | | | | | | DNQ | DNQ | | | 0 |
| | (France) Corentin Normand | Honda | | | | | | | | | DNQ | DNQ | | | 0 |
| | (France) Etienne Vignon | KTM | | | | | | | | | DNQ | DNQ | | | 0 |
| | (France) Florian Schertzinger | KTM | | | | | | | | | DNQ | DNQ | | | 0 |
| | (France) Sacha de Monmahou | Yamaha | | | | | | | | | DNQ | DNQ | | | 0 |
| | (France) Théo Ragot | Husqvarna | | | | | | | | | DNQ | DNQ | | | 0 |
| | (France) Steven Baltenweck | Husqvarna | | | | | | | | | DNQ | DNQ | | | 0 |
| | (France) Maxime Simon | Gas Gas | | | | | | | | | DNQ | DNQ | | | 0 |
| Pos | Rider | Bike | BAS (Normandy) | | CAS (Occitania) | | ROM (Brittany) | | BIT (Grand Est) | | VIL (Bourgogne-Franche-Comté) | | ERN (Pays de la Loire) | | Points |
