= 2024 European Motocross Championship =

Motocross Competition in 2024

The 2024 European Motocross Championship was the 36th European Motocross Championship season since it was revived in 1988. It included 14 events and 6 different classes. It started in Spain on 24 March, and ended at a different location in Spain on 29 September. All rounds acted as support classes at the European rounds of the 2024 MXGP.

== EMX250 ==
A 11-round calendar for the 2024 season was announced on 12 October 2023. EMX250 is for riders competing on 2-stroke and 4-stroke motorcycles between 175cc-250cc. Only riders under the age of 21 are allowed to compete.

=== Calendar ===
Round	Date	Grand Prix	Location	Race 1 Winner	Race 2 Winner	Round Winner	Report
1	24 March	Spain	intu Xanadú	(Italy) Valerio Lata	(France) Mathis Valin	(Italy) Valerio Lata	
2	14 April	Trentino	Pietramurata	(Italy) Valerio Lata	(Italy) Valerio Lata	(Italy) Valerio Lata	
3	5 May	Portugal	Águeda	(Netherlands) Cas Valk	(Netherlands) Cas Valk	(Netherlands) Cas Valk	
4	19 May	France	Saint-Jean-d'Angély	(France) Mathis Valin	(France) Mathis Valin	(France) Mathis Valin	
5	2 June	Germany	Teutschenthal	(Italy) Valerio Lata	(France) Mathis Valin	(France) Mathis Valin	
6	9 June	Latvia	Ķegums	(Netherlands) Cas Valk	(Italy) Valerio Lata	(Netherlands) Cas Valk	
7	28 July	Flanders	Lommel	(France) Mathis Valin	(Netherlands) Cas Valk	(Italy) Valerio Lata	
8	11 August	Sweden	Uddevalla	(Netherlands) Cas Valk	(Italy) Valerio Lata	(Netherlands) Ivano van Erp	
9	25 August	Switzerland	Frauenfeld	(Italy) Valerio Lata	(France) Mathis Valin	(Italy) Valerio Lata	
10	8 September	Turkey	Afyonkarahisar	(France) Mathis Valin	(France) Mathis Valin	(France) Mathis Valin	
11	29 September	Castilla-La Mancha	Cózar	(France) Mathis Valin	(France) Mathis Valin	(France) Mathis Valin	

=== Entry list ===
Team	Constructor	No	Rider	Rounds
Wozniak MX Racing Team	Yamaha	2	(Denmark) Nicolai Skovbjerg	1–4, 7–9
Wozniak MX Racing Team	Yamaha	256	(Denmark) Magnus Smith	1–6, 8–9
KTM Sarholz Racing Team	Husqvarna	3	(Germany) Linus Jung	5
RFME MX Junior Team	Gas Gas	6	(Spain) Elias Escandell	All
RFME MX Junior Team	Gas Gas	29	(Spain) Francisco García	1–7
RGS MX Team	Husqvarna	7	(Belgium) Junior Bal	7
Chambers Racing	KTM	10	(United Kingdom) Harvey Cashmore	7
Chambers Racing	KTM	731	(United Kingdom) Alfie Jones	2–4, 7
Team Castellari	Gas Gas	11	(Italy) Giacomo Bosi	11
Team Castellari	Gas Gas	62	(Italy) Davide Zampino	9, 11
Schmicker Racing	KTM	12	(Netherlands) Dave Kooiker	1
Team Giorgio	Gas Gas	20	(France) Toni Giorgessi	1, 4
KTM Motofavorīts MX Team	Gas Gas	21	(Latvia) Rauls Blūmfelds	2
Yamaha Motor Scandinavia	Yamaha	22	(Sweden) Hugo Forsgren	7–8
KTM Cavamotor Team	KTM	23	(Italy) Tommaso Sarasso	2, 4
	Husqvarna	24	(Switzerland) Thomas Oechslin	9
	Gas Gas	26	(Turkey) Ahmed Geren	10
Boutaca Racing Team	KTM	28	(Portugal) Pedro Rino	3
Binário Motorsport	Gas Gas	32	(Portugal) Martim Espinho	3, 11
	Gas Gas	35	(Turkey) Aras Yıldırım	10
Cat Moto Bauerschmidt Husqvarna	Husqvarna	36	(Switzerland) Nico Greutmann	All
Cat Moto Bauerschmidt Husqvarna	Husqvarna	304	(Australia) Liam Owens	1, 5–6
Cat Moto Bauerschmidt Husqvarna	Husqvarna	363	(Liechtenstein) Lyonel Reichl	3–5, 9
Sturm STC Racing Team	Gas Gas	43	(Latvia) Roberts Lūsis	6–7
Star Racing Team	KTM	46	(Turkey) Eren Defineci	10
Team VRT Yamaha Racing	Yamaha	47	(Latvia) Kārlis Reišulis	1–6
Team VRT Yamaha Racing	Yamaha	115	(United States) Gavin Towers	5–8, 10–11
Team VRT Yamaha Racing	Yamaha	432	(Netherlands) Ivano van Erp	All
Team VRT Yamaha Racing	Yamaha	772	(Latvia) Jānis Reišulis	1
AIT Racing Team	KTM	50	(France) Xavier Cazal	1–4
Beddini Gas Gas Factory Juniors	Gas Gas	51	(Denmark) Mads Fredsøe	All
Beddini Gas Gas Factory Juniors	Gas Gas	53	(Italy) Valerio Lata	All
	Yamaha	52	(Belgium) Emile De Baere	1, 7, 9
KMP Honda Racing	Honda	57	(Latvia) Edvards Bidzāns	1–3
Pardi Racing Team	KTM	59	(Italy) Andrea Roberti	7
	Gas Gas	60	(Turkey) Akil Ulusan	10
	Yamaha	66	(Turkey) Baran Kocaman	10
KTM Kosak Team	KTM	70	(Germany) Valentin Kees	1–5
KTM Kosak Team	KTM	75	(Netherlands) Bradley Mesters	1, 6–9, 11
KTM Kosak Team	KTM	428	(Germany) Henry Obenland	5
Team Seven Motorsport	KTM	79	(Italy) Nicola Salvini	2–5, 7
Team Seven Motorsport	KTM	212	(Italy) Alfio Pulvirenti	1–4
MaxBart Motorsport	Husqvarna	212	(Italy) Alfio Pulvirenti	9, 11
MaxBart Motorsport	Husqvarna	669	(Italy) Luca Ruffini	1–8, 11
	Husqvarna	81	(Switzerland) Samuel Oechslin	9
Team VHR Racing	Gas Gas	384	(Spain) Gerard Congost	4–5
Team VHR Racing	Gas Gas	83	(France) Maxime Grau	1
WZ Racing KTM	KTM	83	(France) Maxime Grau	2–6
WZ Racing KTM	KTM	262	(Australia) Ryan Alexanderson	1–6, 8, 10–11
Momento TT	Husqvarna	85	(Portugal) Alex Almeida	3
JRT MX Team	Honda	88	(Italy) Matteo Luigi Russi	9
	Honda	94	(Belgium) Arne Tielens	7
110 Racing	KTM	110	(Estonia) Richard Paat	2, 6, 8, 11
Twenty Racing Suspension Gas Gas	Gas Gas	111	(Netherlands) Damian Knuiman	7
Vema Beton	Gas Gas	114	(Belgium) Nicolas Vennekens	1–3
	Honda	117	(Norway) Theo Hansen	8
Tekyıldız Group	KTM	122	(Turkey) Mehmet Emin Musaoğlu	10
Husqvarna Motorcycles Slovenia	Husqvarna	123	(Slovenia) Jaka Peklaj	1, 3–5
Dream Team	Fantic	125	(Italy) Mattia Barbieri	8–9
MX For Life Stara Gwardia	KTM	131	(Poland) Damian Zdunek	7
CEC Racing	Husqvarna	140	(Sweden) Nike Korsbeck	1, 8
Best Matic Team	Kawasaki	148	(Italy) Tommaso Lodi	2–3, 10
	KTM	151	(Turkey) Mehmet Yiğit Kara	10
Gabriel SS24 KTM	KTM	172	(Netherlands) Cas Valk	All
	Yamaha	183	(Turkey) Ahmet İdrisoğlu	5
AG MX Racing	Honda	200	(Switzerland) Luca Diserens	9
AG MX Racing	Honda	226	(Switzerland) Arthur Steffen	9
HTS KTM	KTM	214	(Hungary) Bence Pergel	2, 9
Klok Dakkapellen/Arcabo	Yamaha	215	(Netherlands) Svenn Borger	7
KTM Estonia	KTM	220	(Estonia) Martin Michelis	2–3, 6–9
	KTM	221	(Turkey) Efe Kemal Hıd	10
Alf Graarud Motor/Tomax Sports Norway	Honda	232	(Norway) Leander Thunshelle	8
YRC High Performance	Yamaha	259	(Norway) Martin Bredesen	8
	KTM	280	(Turkey) Salih Yiğit Teker	10
SixtySeven Racing Team	Husqvarna	282	(Germany) Jakob Zweiacker	5
MS Motorcycles	Husqvarna	290	(Germany) Joshua Völker	9
Motos VR Yamaha	Yamaha	311	(Portugal) Sandro Lobo	3
Namura Bikes	KTM	315	(Spain) David Beltrán	1–4, 7, 9
BUD Racing Kawasaki	Kawasaki	317	(France) Mathis Valin	All
BUD Racing Kawasaki	Kawasaki	339	(Chile) Benjamín Garib	All
Ljunggrens Motor	KTM	320	(Sweden) Sebastian Sundman	6–8
Ghidinelli Racing	Yamaha	329	(Italy) Maurizio Scollo	All
Ghidinelli Racing	Yamaha	744	(Morocco) Saad Soulimani	All
Yamaha Johansson MPE	Yamaha	332	(United States) Myles Monty	8
Team Fix Racing	TM	333	(Italy) Samuele Casadei	9
Yamaha Motor Slovenia	Yamaha	342	(Slovenia) Žan Oven	2
RG3 Suspension Scandinavia	KTM	357	(Norway) Odin Ramseng Haseth	8
KTM Silve Racing	KTM	358	(Finland) Nico Stenberg	6
MOTS Pro	Gas Gas	362	(Spain) Marco Alonso	1
JSL 83 Kawasaki Toulon	Kawasaki	371	(France) Paolo Maschio	1, 4, 7, 9, 11
Mx119 Factory Racing	Gas Gas	382	(Spain) Manuel López	1, 3
Gas Gas Spain	Gas Gas	384	(Spain) Gerard Congost	1, 3
RT400	Husqvarna	400	(Netherlands) Roan Tolsma	4–5, 7, 9
AVT Campers	KTM	410	(United Kingdom) James Barker	1–2
Joyride MX	KTM	417	(Belgium) Hugo Buchelot	4
	Yamaha	418	(United Kingdom) Drew Stock	7
426 Motorsport	KTM	419	(United Kingdom) Joe Brookes	1–10
	KTM	420	(Italy) Andrea Rossi	1–8
East MX	Gas Gas	422	(Finland) Kimi Koskinen	1–7
	Yamaha	426	(Belgium) Tias Callens	7
Q Racing Team	Gas Gas	437	(Czech Republic) Martin Venhoda	2, 5
RGS MX Team	KTM	440	(Sweden) Linus Persson	8
Bike It Kawasaki MX2 Racing Team	Kawasaki	441	(United Kingdom) Billy Askew	1–5, 8–9
MX-Handel Racing	Husqvarna	444	(Estonia) Sebastian Leok	6, 8–9
Yamaha Motor France	Yamaha	446	(France) Adrien Petit	1–2
MotorSpeed	KTM	456	(Norway) Mathias Kjørstad	8
Grizzly Racing Service	KTM	469	(Netherlands) Ryan de Beer	7
Grizzly Racing Service	KTM	505	(Israel) Ben Almagor	7
Next Level Motocross Team	Yamaha	478	(Norway) Adrian Bølviken	8
De Baets Yamaha MX Team	Yamaha	484	(Belgium) Yirre Saenen	7
JM Honda Racing	Honda	494	(Germany) Maximilian Werner	All
MRA Racing Team	Gas Gas	499	(Slovakia) Jaroslav Katriňák	2–5, 9
	Kawasaki	511	(Norway) Martine Hughes	8
RX Moto Oy	Husqvarna	524	(Finland) Miro Varjonen	6
Circuito Saloio Team	Husqvarna	525	(Portugal) Afonso Simões	3
Maddii Racing Fantic by Milwaukee	Fantic	555	(United Kingdom) Cole McCullough	7
MoenREC Racing by Forsell Motor	Husqvarna	567	(Sweden) Rasmus Moen	1–2, 6, 8
NR-Service Racing Team	Gas Gas	586	(Denmark) Lucas Søndergaard	1–4, 7–9, 11
	Gas Gas	587	(Italy) Brando Polato	5, 10
KTM Nordic	KTM	595	(Finland) Eliel Lehtinen	2
FB Factory Motorsport	Husqvarna	598	(France) Ethan Lepigeon	4
MX Moduls	Husqvarna	601	(Latvia) Mairis Pumpurs	1–2, 6–8
	Gas Gas	611	(Latvia) Markuss Kokins	6
Pol Motors	Gas Gas	612	(Estonia) Joosep Pärn	2, 5–6, 8
K-Tech Aristo Cars Racing	KTM	616	(United Kingdom) Ollie Colmer	2–9
Team Rhino Racing	Yamaha	633	(Denmark) Jakob Frandsen	1
Vision Design	KTM	634	(Switzerland) Remo Schudel	9
SM Action Fantic Racing Team	Fantic	717	(France) Alexis Fueri	1–9, 11
	KTM	726	(Netherlands) Xander Vossebeld	7
Carlssons Motor	Husqvarna	743	(Sweden) Filip Hagdahl	8
MQ World Factory Racing Team	KTM	753	(Italy) Patrick Busatto	2, 9
	KTM	763	(Norway) Jan Arve Gramstad	8
	Honda	848	(Denmark) Emil Gjedde	8
Dirt Store Kawasaki	Kawasaki	912	(United Kingdom) Joel Rizzi	7
Maggiora Park Racing Team	KTM	928	(Italy) Vincenzo Bove	2, 9
Mecamotor KTM	KTM	938	(Brazil) Rodolfo Bicalho	1–5, 7–8, 11
GT Racing KTM	KTM	961	(Sweden) August Frisk	2–8

=== Riders Championship ===
Pos	Rider	Bike	ESP (Spain)		TRE		POR (Portugal)		FRA (France)		GER (Germany)		LAT (Latvia)		FLA (Flanders)		SWE (Sweden)		SUI (Switzerland)		TUR (Turkey)		CAS		Points
1	(France) Mathis Valin	Kawasaki	3	1	4	4	2	4	1	1	5	1	5	5	1	4	3	3	4	1	1	1	1	1	470
2	(Italy) Valerio Lata	Gas Gas	1	2	1	1	3	2	25	13	1	11	4	1	2	2	4	1	1	2	2	4	6	2	436
3	(Netherlands) Cas Valk	KTM	4	19	2	2	1	1	7	3	4	3	1	3	4	1	1	6	2	6	4	3	3	6	424
4	(Netherlands) Ivano van Erp	Yamaha	5	3	11	10	6	3	15	5	7	17	3	4	6	3	2	2	3	19	3	2	4	Ret	331
5	(Morocco) Saad Soulimani	Yamaha	25	9	7	5	5	5	3	8	13	6	8	23	5	9	6	20	Ret	10	6	11	11	7	247
6	(Switzerland) Nico Greutmann	Husqvarna	Ret	10	14	6	11	6	11	11	11	5	Ret	8	16	18	7	9	7	4	24	13	5	14	214
7	(Chile) Benjamín Garib	Kawasaki	22	12	Ret	9	31	22	18	21	9	9	10	7	12	Ret	5	5	6	5	10	7	2	4	204
8	(Germany) Maximilian Werner	Honda	24	6	Ret	13	7	Ret	21	12	10	19	9	9	9	12	10	7	33	3	9	6	14	4	201
9	(Denmark) Mads Fredsøe	Gas Gas	16	21	9	14	25	Ret	5	6	17	24	18	14	17	25	Ret	29	5	12	7	8	8	8	151
10	(Spain) Francisco García	Gas Gas	9	14	3	3	8	10	16	9	8	Ret	11	22	7	8									150
11	(Latvia) Kārlis Reišulis	Yamaha	2	Ret	13	Ret	30	11	12	2	3	7	2	2											149
12	(Spain) Elias Escandell	Gas Gas	11	8	16	20	29	27	32	Ret	25	20	6	Ret	20	16	8	10	8	8	8	9	9	12	147
13	(France) Maxime Grau	Gas Gas	7	Ret																					144
13	(France) Maxime Grau	KTM			5	34	4	12	2	4	2	4	14	Ret											144
14	(United States) Gavin Towers	Yamaha									6	2	Ret	18	Ret	11	Ret	4			5	5	12	3	129
15	(Netherlands) Bradley Mesters	KTM	10	5									15	6	3	6	15	14	Ret	Ret			10	13	115
16	(France) Alexis Fueri	Fantic	12	7	8	8	Ret	DNS	13	Ret	12	8	Ret	Ret	Ret	Ret	9	16	Ret	13			15	Ret	110
17	(Denmark) Nicolai Skovbjerg	Yamaha	21	17	20	11	19	14	23	18					10	5	11	15	10	7					95
18	(Denmark) Magnus Smith	Yamaha	17	30	12	12	12	7	20	7	16	21	17	10			Ret	11	17	Ret					94
19	(United Kingdom) Joe Brookes	KTM	Ret	DNS	28	Ret	10	Ret	35	Ret	32	12	7	12	Ret	30	12	8	14	Ret	11	14			89
20	(Australia) Ryan Alexanderson	KTM	23	24	DNQ	DNQ	9	15	22	Ret	20	14	28	24			Ret	12			12	10	7	10	80
21	(Sweden) August Frisk	KTM			10	15	22	8	17	16	15	18	16	11	8	20	Ret	DNS							77
22	(United Kingdom) Billy Askew	Kawasaki	19	15	DNS	DNS	16	9	9	10	DNS	DNS					14	13	16	17					72
23	(Italy) Andrea Rossi	KTM	18	13	DNS	DNS	13	16	10	14	14	Ret	21	19	Ret	14	13	17							70
24	(Italy) Maurizio Scollo	Yamaha	26	33	18	21	Ret	18	19	23	26	16	27	29	Ret	28	DNS	DNS	18	28	13	12	16	11	53
25	(Italy) Alfio Pulvirenti	KTM	Ret	Ret	15	17	23	21	30	DNS															49
25	(Italy) Alfio Pulvirenti	Husqvarna																	9	18			13	5	49
26	(Italy) Luca Ruffini	Husqvarna	15	32	23	16	Ret	20	4	15	27	26	Ret	DNS	DNQ	DNQ	Ret	DNS					18	15	45
27	(Latvia) Mairis Pumpurs	Husqvarna	33	22	21	Ret							12	13	11	10	Ret	26							38
28	(Hungary) Bence Pergel	KTM			6	7													15	Ret					35
29	(Latvia) Jānis Reišulis	Yamaha	6	4																					33
30	(Italy) Nicola Salvini	KTM			25	22	14	13	24	17	18	13			30	Ret									30
31	(Slovakia) Jaroslav Katriňák	GasGas			27	18			8	24	21	32							Ret	11					26
32	(United Kingdom) Ollie Colmer	KTM			33	29	17	Ret	26	31	24	22	20	27	15	15	23	23	18	15					26
33	(Spain) Gerard Congost	Gas Gas	8	27			20	24	39	19	Ret	15													22
34	(United Kingdom) Joel Rizzi	Kawasaki													14	7									21
35	(Switzerland) Luca Diserens	Honda																	12	9					21
36	(France) Toni Giorgessi	Gas Gas	31	16					6	25															20
37	(Estonia) Martin Michelis	KTM			34	25	Ret	29					Ret	15	19	17	17	19	Ret	DNS					18
38	(Australia) Liam Owens	Husqvarna	20	25							Ret	10	22	17											16
39	(Germany) Valentin Kees	KTM	14	23	17	23	24	19	DNS	DNS	19	Ret													15
40	(Latvia) Markuss Kokins	Gas Gas											13	16											13
41	(Finland) Kimi Koskinen	Gas Gas	Ret	37	26	Ret	15	26	14	28	DNS	DNS	Ret	DNS	Ret	DNS									13
42	(Italy) Brando Polato	Gas Gas									35	31									14	15			13
43	(France) Paolo Maschio	Kawasaki	Ret	11					37	26					23	23			24	20			Ret	20	12
44	(France) Adrien Petit	Yamaha	13	20	19	31																			11
45	(Italy) Tommaso Lodi	Kawasaki			DNQ	DNQ	DNQ	DNQ													15	16			11
46	(Italy) Matteo Luigi Russi	Honda																	11	29					10
47	(Netherlands) Damian Knuiman	KTM													13	19									10
48	(Turkey) Efe Kemal Hıd	KTM																			16	17			9
49	(United Kingdom) Cole McCullough	Fantic													28	13									8
50	(Switzerland) Thomas Oechslin	Husqvarna																	21	14					7
51	(Italy) Giacomo Bosi	Gas Gas																					19	16	7
52	(Spain) David Beltrán	KTM	DNS	DNS	22	28	18	17	27	22					22	27			25	21					7
53	(Estonia) Sebastian Leok	Husqvarna											Ret	26			18	18	20	27					7
54	(Switzerland) Samuel Oechslin	Husqvarna																	23	16					5
55	(Sweden) Linus Persson	KTM															16	Ret							5
56	(Turkey) Mehmet Emin Musaoğlu	KTM																			19	18			5
57	(Turkey) Akil Ulusan	Gas Gas																			18	19			5
58	(Italy) Davide Zampino	Gas Gas																	22	Ret			21	17	4
59	(Estonia) Richard Paat	KTM			DNQ	DNQ							24	28			27	34					17	Ret	4
60	(Turkey) Mehmet Yiğit Kara	KTM																			17	21			4
61	(Portugal) Martim Espinho	Gas Gas					35	36															20	18	4
62	(Belgium) Junior Bal	Husqvarna													18	22									3
63	(Netherlands) Dave Kooiker	KTM	29	18																					3
64	(Denmark) Lucas Søndergaard	Gas Gas	DNQ	DNQ	DNQ	DNQ	34	35	38	34					DNQ	DNQ	31	35	DNQ	30			23	19	2
65	(Latvia) Edvards Bidzāns	Honda	30	31	24	19	Ret	DNS																	2
66	(Sweden) Hugo Forsgren	Yamaha													Ret	24	19	32							2
67	(Finland) Nico Stenberg	KTM											19	25											2
68	(Switzerland) Arthur Steffen	Honda																	19	DNS					2
69	(Turkey) Aras Yıldırım	Gas Gas																			20	20			2
70	(Liechtenstein) Lyonel Reichl	Husqvarna					21	30	29	20	23	Ret							32	Ret					1
71	(Finland) Miro Varjonen	Husqvarna											25	20											1
72	(Norway) Adrian Bølviken	Yamaha															20	Ret							1
	(Netherlands) Roan Tolsma	Husqvarna							DNQ	32	31	29			21	21			28	25					0
	(Sweden) Rasmus Moen	Husqvarna	32	34	DNQ	DNS							29	30			21	22							0
	(Turkey) Ahmed Geren	Gas Gas																			21	22			0
	(Estonia) Joosep Pärn	Gas Gas			DNQ	DNQ					Ret	28	23	32			32	21							0
	(Latvia) Roberts Lūsis	Gas Gas											26	21	26	Ret									0
	(Czech Republic) Martin Venhoda	Gas Gas			31	24					22	23													0
	(Turkey) Eren Defineci	KTM																			22	24			0
	(Italy) Mattia Barbieri	Fantic															26	25	29	22					0
	(Brazil) Rodolfo Bicalho	KTM	34	38	29	30	DNQ	DNQ	33	Ret	34	30			DNQ	DNQ	Ret	27					22	Ret	0
	(Norway) Leander Thunshelle	Honda															22	Ret							0
	(Turkey) Salih Yiğit Teker	KTM																			23	23			0
	(United Kingdom) Alfie Jones	KTM			DNQ	DNQ	28	23	31	27					29	33									0
	(Italy) Vincenzo Bove	KTM			35	33													27	23					0
	(Sweden) Nike Korsbeck	Husqvarna	DNQ	DNQ													25	24							0
	(Netherlands) Ryan de Beer	KTM													24	26									0
	(Sweden) Sebastian Sundman	KTM											30	31	31	Ret	24	28							0
	(Belgium) Emile De Baere	Yamaha	DNQ	DNQ											Ret	Ret			Ret	24					0
	(Slovenia) Jaka Peklaj	Husqvarna	28	28			32	25	DNS	DNS	28	25													0
	(Turkey) Baran Kocaman	Yamaha																			25	25			0
	(Israel) Ben Almagor	KTM													25	29									0
	(France) Xavier Cazal	KTM	Ret	29	DNQ	26	26	28	28	29															0
	(Germany) Joshua Völker	Husqvarna																	30	26					0
	(Italy) Patrick Busatto	KTM			32	32													26	DNS					0
	(Italy) Tommaso Sarasso	KTM			30	27			36	30															0
	(Germany) Henry Obenland	KTM									30	27													0
	(Spain) Manuel López	Gas Gas	27	35			33	31																	0
	(Italy) Andrea Roberti	KTM													27	31									0
	(Belgium) Nicolas Vennekens	Gas Gas	DNQ	DNQ	DNQ	DNQ	27	33																	0
	(United States) Myles Monty	Yamaha															28	Ret							0
	(Sweden) Filip Hagdahl	Husqvarna															29	31							0
	(Germany) Linus Jung	Husqvarna									29	Ret													0
	(Norway) Mathias Kjørstad	KTM															30	30							0
	(Switzerland) Remo Schudel	KTM																	31	Ret					0
	(Belgium) Yirre Saenen	Yamaha													32	32									0
	(Portugal) Sandro Lobo	Yamaha					DNQ	32																	0
	(Germany) Jakob Zweiacker	Husqvarna									33	33													0
	(France) Ethan Lepigeon	Husqvarna							34	33															0
	(Norway) Odin Ramseng Haseth	KTM															DNQ	33							0
	(Italy) Samuele Casadei	TM																	34	Ret					0
	(Portugal) Pedro Rino	KTM					DNQ	34																	0
	(Belgium) Tias Callens	Yamaha													DNQ	34									0
	(United Kingdom) James Barker	KTM	DNQ	DNQ	36	Ret																			0
	(Spain) Marco Alonso	GasGas	DNQ	36																					0
	(Turkey) Ahmet İdrisoğlu	Yamaha									DNS	DNS													0
	(Norway) Martine Hughes	Kawasaki															DNQ	DNQ							0
	(Norway) Martin Bredesen	Yamaha															DNQ	DNQ							0
	(Norway) Theo Hansen	Honda															DNQ	DNQ							0
	(Norway) Jan Arve Gramstad	KTM															DNQ	DNQ							0
	(Denmark) Emil Gjedde	Honda															DNQ	DNQ							0
	(Netherlands) Svenn Borger	Yamaha													DNQ	DNQ									0
	(Poland) Damian Zdunek	KTM													DNQ	DNQ									0
	(United Kingdom) Drew Stock	Yamaha													DNQ	DNQ									0
	(Netherlands) Xander Vossebeld	KTM													DNQ	DNQ									0
	(Belgium) Arne Tielens	Honda													DNQ	DNQ									0
	(United Kingdom) Harvey Cashmore	KTM													DNQ	DNQ									0
	(Belgium) Hugo Buchelot	KTM							DNQ	DNQ															0
	(Portugal) Alex Almeida	Husqvarna					DNQ	DNQ																	0
	(Portugal) Afonso Simões	Husqvarna					DNQ	DNQ																	0
	(Finland) Eliel Lehtinen	KTM			DNQ	DNQ																			0
	(Latvia) Rauls Blūmfelds	Gas Gas			DNQ	DNQ																			0
	(Slovenia) Žan Oven	Yamaha			DNQ	DNQ																			0
	(Denmark) Jakob Frandsen	Yamaha	DNQ	DNQ																					0
Pos	Rider	Bike	ESP (Spain)		TRE		POR (Portugal)		FRA (France)		GER (Germany)		LAT (Latvia)		FLA (Flanders)		SWE (Sweden)		SUI (Switzerland)		TUR (Turkey)		CAS		Points

=== Manufacturers Championship ===
Pos	Bike	ESP (Spain)		TRE		POR (Portugal)		FRA (France)		GER (Germany)		LAT (Latvia)		FLA (Flanders)		SWE (Sweden)		SUI (Switzerland)		TUR (Turkey)		CAS		Points
1	Kawasaki	3	1	4	4	2	4	1	1	5	1	5	5	1	4	3	3	4	1	1	1	1	1	470
2	Gas Gas	1	2	1	1	3	2	5	6	1	11	4	1	2	2	4	1	1	2	2	4	6	2	459
3	KTM	4	5	2	2	1	1	2	3	2	3	1	3	3	1	1	6	2	6	4	3	3	6	452
4	Yamaha	2	3	7	5	5	3	3	2	3	2	2	2	5	3	2	2	3	7	3	2	4	3	430
5	Husqvarna	15	10	14	6	11	6	4	11	11	5	12	8	11	10	7	9	7	4	24	13	5	5	259
6	Honda	24	6	24	13	7	Ret	21	12	10	19	9	9	9	12	10	7	11	3	9	6	14	4	211
7	Fantic	12	7	8	8	Ret	DNS	13	Ret	12	8	Ret	Ret	28	13	9	16	Ret	13			15	Ret	118
	TM																	34	Ret					0
Pos	Bike	ESP (Spain)		TRE		POR (Portugal)		FRA (France)		GER (Germany)		LAT (Latvia)		FLA (Flanders)		SWE (Sweden)		SUI (Switzerland)		TUR (Turkey)		CAS		Points

== EMX125 ==
A 11-round calendar for the 2024 season was announced on 12 October 2023. EMX125 is for riders competing on 2-stroke motorcycles of 125cc.

=== Calendar ===
Round	Date	Grand Prix	Location	Race 1 Winner	Race 2 Winner	Round Winner	Report
1	7 April	Sardinia	Riola Sardo	(Netherlands) Gyan Doensen	(Hungary) Noel Zanócz	(Hungary) Noel Zanócz	
2	14 April	Trentino	Pietramurata	(Italy) Simone Mancini	(Italy) Francesco Bellei	(Italy) Simone Mancini	
3	5 May	Portugal	Águeda	(Hungary) Noel Zanócz	(Netherlands) Gyan Doensen	(Netherlands) Gyan Doensen	
4	12 May	Galicia	Lugo	(Spain) Salvador Pérez	(Netherlands) Dani Heitink	(Italy) Simone Mancini	
5	19 May	France	Saint-Jean-d'Angély	(Italy) Simone Mancini	(Hungary) Noel Zanócz	(Italy) Simone Mancini	
6	9 June	Latvia	Ķegums	(Spain) Salvador Pérez	(Austria) Maximilian Ernecker	(Hungary) Noel Zanócz	
7	16 June	Italy	Maggiora	Race Cancelled	(Netherlands) Gyan Doensen	(Netherlands) Gyan Doensen	
8	11 August	Sweden	Uddevalla	(Netherlands) Dani Heitink	(Hungary) Noel Zanócz	(Italy) Francesco Bellei	
9	18 August	Netherlands	Arnhem	(Netherlands) Gyan Doensen	(Netherlands) Gyan Doensen	(Netherlands) Gyan Doensen	
10	25 August	Switzerland	Frauenfeld	(Italy) Simone Mancini	(Italy) Nicolò Alvisi	(Italy) Nicolò Alvisi	
11	29 September	Castilla-La Mancha	Cózar	(Hungary) Noel Zanócz	(Italy) Francesco Bellei	(Hungary) Noel Zanócz	

=== Entry list ===
Team	Constructor	No	Rider	Rounds
RFME MX Junior Team	Gas Gas	3	(Spain) Carlos Salvador	1–4, 8–10
RFME MX Junior Team	Gas Gas	300	(Spain) Salvador Pérez	All
RFME MX Junior Team	Gas Gas	351	(Spain) Carlos Prat	All
Steels Dr. Jack TM Racing	TM	5	(Italy) Brando Rispoli	1–9, 11
Gas Gas Colombia	Gas Gas	6	(Colombia) Miguel Ángel Rojas	9–11
Insubria Team Motocross	Yamaha	7	(Italy) Niccolò Mannini	8–11
Insubria Team Motocross	Yamaha	148	(Italy) Davide Onoscuri	8–9
KMR Treize	KTM	8	(France) Ilyes Ortiz	5
	KTM	9	(Italy) Mattia Piredda	1
	KTM	29	(Italy) Samuele Piredda	1
	Gas Gas	10	(France) Amaury Maindru	1–4, 6–7
	Yamaha	12	(Italy) Riccardo Perrone	9–10
Team Gas Gas Pepiteria13	Gas Gas	13	(Venezuela) César Aponte	3–4, 11
Wozniak MX Racing Team	Yamaha	15	(Denmark) Frederik Rahn Stampe	1–2, 6, 8–9
	KTM	16	(Norway) Edgar Bjerkeli	8
DVS Junior Racing	TM	17	(Indonesia) Angga Lubis	3–5
DVS Junior Racing	TM	99	(France) Enzo Lefebvre	3–4
DVS Junior Racing	TM	268	(South Africa) Ryan Adler	1–2
DVS Junior Racing	TM	356	(Spain) Bruno Puerto	1–4
DVS Junior Racing	TM	529	(Belgium) Maxime Lucas	7–9
Tech32 Racing MX	KTM	529	(Belgium) Maxime Lucas	2, 5
Dreams Racing	KTM	18	(Italy) Alessandro Gaspari	1–2, 4–11
Dreams Racing	KTM	141	(Italy) Francesco Bellei	All
Sturm STC Racing Team	Gas Gas	19	(Latvia) Raivo Laicāns	6
Racestore KTM Factory Rookies	KTM	20	(Italy) Nicolò Alvisi	1–2, 6–11
Racestore KTM Factory Rookies	KTM	574	(Netherlands) Gyan Doensen	All
ADAC Hessen-Thüringen	KTM	21	(Germany) Anthony Caspari	2, 6–7, 9–10
	Gas Gas	23	(Belgium) Seppe Giuliani	2, 9
Polaris Nordmøre KTM	KTM	25	(Norway) Marius Nordbø	11
Team Race Engine Diforte	Gas Gas	26	(France) Kylian Maallem	5
Dirtbike Racing Team	Husqvarna	27	(Israel) Ofir Casey Tzemach	All
Voss KTM Racing Team	KTM	28	(Netherlands) Dean Gregoire	1–3, 7
Voss KTM Racing Team	KTM	407	(United Kingdom) Jake Davies	2–3, 8–9
Motovation Motorsport	KTM	28	(Netherlands) Dean Gregoire	8–11
Motovation Motorsport	KTM	480	(Finland) Kasimir Hindersson	1–6
Motovation Motorsport	KTM	592	(Sweden) Freddie Bartlett	1–7
Leon Sagaert By Xavier Beel	Gas Gas	32	(Belgium) Seth Priem	2–5, 7–10
	KTM	34	(Slovenia) Lukas Osek	2, 7
F4E Gas Gas Racing Team	Gas Gas	36	(Belgium) Arthur Decouter	2, 9–10
F4E Gas Gas Racing Team	Gas Gas	100	(Belgium) Harry Seel	1–10
F4E Gas Gas Racing Team	Gas Gas	474	(Belgium) Ian Ampoorter	3, 8
F4E Gas Gas Racing Team	Gas Gas	919	(Austria) Maximilian Ernecker	1–10
KTM South Africa	KTM	37	(South Africa) Trey Cox	5, 10
MX-Handel Racing	Husqvarna	40	(Estonia) Travis Leok	2, 6, 8, 10
	Yamaha	42	(Poland) Dawid Zaremba	2, 8
CTM Motorhomes	Yamaha	46	(Belgium) Thybe Ceulemans	8–9
	Yamaha	49	(Netherlands) Sem Taspinar	9
	Fantic	51	(Italy) Giovanni Ciampi	2
	Yamaha	52	(Belgium) Emile De Baere	7, 9
Pardi Racing KTM	KTM	59	(Italy) Andrea Roberti	7
Team Ride Innovation Development	Husqvarna	66	(France) Yannis Lopez	1–2, 4–5, 10
Team Ride Innovation Development	KTM	151	(Switzerland) Eliot Vidalenc	5
Ykkös-mp Oy	KTM	71	(Finland) Arttu Sahlstén	6
Boutaca Racing Team	Husqvarna	78	(Portugal) Gonçalo Cardoso	1, 3–5, 8–9, 11
	Gas Gas	80	(Hungary) Péter Varga	1
AIT Racing Team	Gas Gas	81	(Bulgaria) Vencislav Toshev	1–2, 8–11
MJR Racing Team	Gas Gas	83	(Spain) Enzo Badenas	2–4, 10–11
MSN Service	KTM	90	(Finland) Onni Jaakonsaari	6, 8
SDM Corse Fantic Racing	Fantic	97	(Italy) Simone Mancini	All
SDM Corse Fantic Racing	Fantic	518	(Belgium) Douwe Van Mechgelen	All
SDM Corse Fantic Racing	Fantic	716	(Hungary) Noel Zanócz	All
MTA MX Racing	KTM	102	(Italy) Filippo Mantovani	3–7, 11
BvZ Racing Team	KTM	103	(Andorra) Martin Kettlitz	1–2, 4
	KTM	107	(Italy) Riccardo Marchini	11
AMX Racing	Husqvarna	112	(Denmark) Jacob Bloch	8–9
Jezyk Racing Team	KTM	117	(Spain) Juan Izaguirre	3–5, 7, 9–11
Jezyk Racing Team	KTM	238	(France) Tom Brunet	All
Jezyk Racing Team	KTM	371	(Spain) Marc Roma	3–4
Ambiance Moto	Gas Gas	118	(France) Emerick Vergote	5
Namura Bikes	KTM	122	(Spain) Valentino Vázquez	3–5, 11
Moto FM Saúde	KTM	123	(Portugal) Filipe Saúde	3
Dream Team	Fantic	125	(Italy) Mattia Barbieri	1–2, 4–7
Dream Team	Fantic	228	(Italy) Michael Conte	All
Dream Team	Fantic	500	(Italy) Francesco Zoriaco	1–10
Moto Fundador	Yamaha	139	(Portugal) Bernardo Pinto	3
Kenneth Gundersen MX Team	Husqvarna	147	(Norway) Theodor Imenes	8
Meyer Racing	Yamaha	153	(Germany) Max Meyer	7, 10
Motos VR Yamaha	Yamaha	158	(Portugal) Vasco Salgado	3
Motosports Racing Team	Husqvarna	161	(Latvia) Alberts Knapšis	6
CSR Racing Team	KTM	172	(Italy) Andrea de Luca	7
	Yamaha	184	(United Kingdom) Jamie Keith	9
	Yamaha	185	(Portugal) Rodrigo Barros	3
Polned KTM	KTM	188	(Netherlands) Rizan Hartman	3, 9–10
Becker Racing	Gas Gas	194	(Germany) Jonathan Frank	1–7
	Gas Gas	199	(Spain) Unai Samper	1
	Beta	200	(Italy) Davide Zanone	7, 10
KTM Switzerland	KTM	202	(Switzerland) Ryan Oppliger	10–11
Team 3RG	KTM	204	(France) Raphaël Darne	5
Yamaha E. Castro	Yamaha	205	(Spain) Alejandro Torres	11
Yamaha E. Castro	Yamaha	217	(Argentina) Juan Felipe García	11
MCV Motorsport ABF Italia	Fantic	211	(Italy) Riccardo Pini	1–2, 8–11
3MX Motorsport Team	Gas Gas	213	(Italy) Federico Salvi	1–2, 7, 9–10
	Yamaha	215	(Norway) Brede Gultvedt	8
El Motorista/Dentalife	Gas Gas	218	(Spain) Marino Villar	11
Team Vola Racing	KTM	219	(Italy) Yuri Lombardo	2
	Husqvarna	220	(Norway) Brian Hellestø	8
JT911 KTM Racing Team	KTM	225	(France) Nicolas Clément	2
	Gas Gas	229	(Poland) Michał Psiuk	2
	Yamaha	231	(France) Elvis Gaulon	10
Team Seven Motorsport	KTM	240	(Chile) César Paine Díaz	1–7, 10
TSantos Racing	Gas Gas	247	(Portugal) Tomás Santos	3
	Yamaha	259	(France) Félix Cardineau	3–5
Motos Arribas Racing Team	Husqvarna	270	(Spain) Oscar Quiros	9–11
JK Racing Yamaha	Yamaha	284	(Italy) Giorgio Orlando	1, 7–10
JK Racing Yamaha	Yamaha	312	(Switzerland) Noe Zumstein	1, 3–4, 7, 10
Team Yamaha Europe MJC	Yamaha	295	(France) Mano Fauré	1–7
Team Yamaha Europe MJC	Yamaha	499	(Netherlands) Dani Heitink	All
Team Yamaha Europe MJC	Yamaha	503	(Belgium) Jarne Bervoets	1–9, 11
Team Dyno MX	Husqvarna	299	(France) Dylan Conti	5
Team WID Motorsport	KTM	301	(France) Liam Bruneau	1–7
VHM Racing Products/GMS Sports	KTM	305	(Sweden) Pontus Girmalm	6
	KTM	321	(Italy) Alessandro Traversini	1–5, 8–11
Superior Moto Gas Gas	Gas Gas	331	(Switzerland) Noryn Polsini	10
Motocross Center	Gas Gas	337	(Spain) Bruno Miró	2–5, 7, 10
Team Stombergs Racing	KTM	349	(Sweden) William Lidnert	8
	Yamaha	350	(France) Sleny Goyer	11
Yamaha Motor Slovenia	Yamaha	355	(Slovenia) Gal Geršak	2
	Gas Gas	370	(Spain) Xavier Camps	1–4, 6–7
Ausió Racing Team	Yamaha	374	(Spain) Oleguer Riba	4, 7
MB Motocross Team	KTM	390	(Norway) Isak Engelin	8
MB Motocross Team	KTM	431	(Norway) Markus Sommerstad	8–9
MB Motocross Team	KTM	979	(Norway) Edvard Hestvik	8
	Fantic	412	(Belgium) Liam Pölöskei	5, 9
Van de Laar Racing	Yamaha	417	(Netherlands) Jayson van Drunen	All
	Yamaha	418	(United Kingdom) Drew Stock	2, 5, 9
GripMesser Racing Team	Gas Gas	427	(Netherlands) Mick Kennedy	1–2, 5, 9–10
	Yamaha	429	(Belgium) Emerick Pansaerts	2
De Baets Yamaha MX Team	Yamaha	438	(Belgium) Brent Van de Walle	5–7, 9–10
De Baets Yamaha MX Team	Yamaha	484	(Netherlands) Dex Kooiker	1–6
De Baets Yamaha MX Team	Yamaha	589	(Belgium) Tyla Van de Poel	1–2, 8–11
MP Racing Oy	Husqvarna	450	(Finland) Simo Koskinen	6, 8
La Foce Racing Team	KTM	452	(Italy) Alex Gruber	1–2, 9–10
KTL Racing Klubi	Gas Gas	454	(Finland) Jan Jasper Kõiv	6
	KTM	462	(Norway) Terje Bystrøm	8
MotoClub Cremona	KTM	466	(Czech Republic) Václav Janout	1–2, 5, 9–10
Husqvarna Scandinavia	Husqvarna	471	(Norway) Pelle Gundersen	1–8
SJP Moto	KTM	478	(United Kingdom) Josh Vail	1, 5
KTM Nordic/Motopalvelu	KTM	480	(Finland) Kasimir Hindersson	8
813 Motorsport/KGMX Team	KTM	483	(Norway) Andre Marthinsen	8
Team Ortíz Motos	Gas Gas	494	(Spain) Pablo Lara	3–5, 11
Forsell Motor	Husqvarna	496	(Sweden) Alve Callemo	8
KTM Israel	KTM	505	(Israel) Ben Almagor	5, 7
MX Stroma Gas Gas Racing Team	Gas Gas	512	(Belgium) Uwe De Waele	2, 9
	Fantic	522	(Slovenia) Miha Vrh	2, 7, 10
LF Motorsport	Yamaha	530	(France) Simon de Ruyter	1–2, 8–9
BRS Racing Team	Fantic	531	(Sweden) Hugo Bergqvist	6, 8
Fastlane Racing Team	Yamaha	537	(Denmark) Emil Gordon Rohmann	8
Team Pol Motors	Gas Gas	551	(Netherlands) Mike Visser	9
Maddii Fantic Racing by Milwaukee	Fantic	555	(Republic of Ireland) Cole McCullough	All
	KTM	611	(Sweden) Gustav Johnsson	9
MXMagmum	Gas Gas	641	(Latvia) Tomass Šaicāns	1–2, 6, 9
ANFI/Canary Factory	Fantic	646	(Spain) José Hernández	All
KMP Honda Racing	Gas Gas	701	(Lithuania) Marius Adomaitis	6, 9–10
Yamaha Motor Switzerland	Yamaha	710	(Switzerland) Tristan Blanc	10
	Fantic	712	(Germany) Toni Ziemer	10
MX Moduls	Gas Gas	714	(Latvia) Markuss Ozoliņš	1–8
Bloms MX Racing Team	Husqvarna	717	(Sweden) Otto Gustavsson	6, 8
Yamaha Latvija	Yamaha	724	(Latvia) Jēkabs Kubuliņš	3, 6, 8–10
DMX Celestini Motorsport	Fantic	737	(Italy) Luca Colonnelli	1–2, 7
DMX Celestini Motorsport	Fantic	911	(Italy) Gennaro Utech	1–2, 7
	KTM	745	(France) Jules Blanchard	10
MX For Live - Stara Gwardia	Husqvarna	761	(Poland) Maciej Chlewiński	6
AMB Racing Team	KTM	784	(Estonia) Kaspar Uibu	1–2
	Gas Gas	799	(Latvia) Ralfs Spila	6
	Yamaha	803	(Italy) Angelo Mosè Cirignotta	7
Team HTS KTM	KTM	817	(Hungary) Áron Katona	All
	Gas Gas	828	(Belgium) Tom Dukerts	2, 9–10
Turci Racing Team	KTM	831	(Italy) Paolo Martorano	2
CEC Racing	Husqvarna	884	(Sweden) Casper Lindmark	1–6, 8, 10–11
SLH Team	Yamaha	917	(Switzerland) Dany Henzer	10
PowerbyJJ Racing Team	Gas Gas	920	(Sweden) Sandro Sols	6, 8–9
BvZ.de Racing Team	Gas Gas	939	(Denmark) Emil Lodal	2, 5, 8–10
Karlströms Motor	Gas Gas	981	(Sweden) Gustav Axelsson	8
SpeedCity	Yamaha	999	(Portugal) Miguel Caridade	3

=== Riders Championship ===
Pos	Rider	Bike	SAR		TRE		POR (Portugal)		GAL		FRA (France)		LAT (Latvia)		ITA (Italy)		SWE (Sweden)		NED (Netherlands)		SUI (Switzerland)		CAS		Points
1	(Hungary) Noel Zanócz	Fantic	2	1	13	2	1	2	12	9	3	1	2	3	C	8	6	1	2	6	Ret	3	1	2	389
2	(Netherlands) Gyan Doensen	KTM	1	4	7	9	2	1	3	17	8	3	10	2	C	1	4	4	1	1	6	5	5	4	382
3	(Italy) Simone Mancini	Fantic	17	Ret	1	3	15	3	2	2	1	2	3	4	C	3	Ret	2	6	2	1	13	2	3	358
4	(Italy) Francesco Bellei	KTM	15	12	5	1	4	10	4	3	13	5	9	8	C	11	2	3	19	16	3	4	3	1	314
5	(Spain) Salvador Pérez	Gas Gas	13	3	2	6	3	4	1	20	4	18	1	12	C	13	11	13	18	22	2	9	10	10	269
6	(Netherlands) Dani Heitink	Yamaha	9	2	12	16	13	13	16	1	19	13	16	13	C	6	1	10	5	3	15	11	19	20	223
7	(Hungary) Áron Katona	KTM	8	10	3	7	5	20	7	Ret	7	24	5	7	C	Ret	7	8	14	18	8	18	12	17	199
8	(Austria) Maximilian Ernecker	Gas Gas	Ret	18	6	4	10	16	10	11	Ret	Ret	18	1	C	10	16	9	7	5	7	2			195
9	(France) Mano Fauré	Yamaha	3	6	9	10	6	7	5	5	2	4	15	10	C	12									185
10	(Italy) Brando Rispoli	TM	DNQ	DNQ	10	5	9	6	20	10	17	8	12	20	C	2	9	25	DNS	DNS			6	8	155
11	(Italy) Nicolò Alvisi	KTM	20	11	Ret	DNS							20	17	C	9	3	14	3	11	5	1	14	5	149
12	(Latvia) Markuss Ozoliņš	Gas Gas	5	15	Ret	8	12	12	6	4	Ret	7	4	11	C	17	5	Ret							148
13	(Republic of Ireland) Cole McCullough	Fantic	Ret	Ret	4	Ret	Ret	9	Ret	8	14	Ret	24	Ret	C	14	12	26	8	7	9	7	18	11	132
14	(Belgium) Jarne Bervoets	Yamaha	6	8	16	14	14	5	21	14	5	25	6	9	C	7	Ret	DNS	Ret	20			20	Ret	129
15	(Belgium) Douwe Van Mechgelen	Fantic	4	7	DNQ	DNQ	Ret	11	15	24	9	10	14	14	C	19	23	11	11	9	16	Ret	DNS	DNS	124
16	(Italy) Alessandro Gaspari	KTM	12	14	DNQ	DNQ			Ret	22	10	15	8	34	C	5	19	17	23	29	4	6	7	13	123
17	(France) Tom Brunet	KTM	Ret	25	DNQ	DNQ	8	15	13	6	6	Ret	33	27	C	4	18	18	28	15	Ret	10	8	15	117
18	(Finland) Kasimir Hindersson	KTM	Ret	5	15	Ret	Ret	18	8	15	Ret	11	7	5			Ret	16							89
19	(Netherlands) Dean Gregoire	KTM	11	13	DNQ	29	Ret	DNS							C	DNS	17	30	9	8	26	8	11	12	79
20	(Spain) Carlos Prat	Gas Gas	14	16	18	Ret	11	14	11	19	23	19	Ret	23	C	20	15	23	21	Ret	10	23	13	Ret	72
21	(Italy) Niccolò Mannini	Yamaha															13	5	20	10	DSQ	20	4	6	70
22	(Sweden) Freddie Bartlett	KTM	Ret	21	17	18	7	8	18	7	16	14	25	15	C	22									69
23	(Italy) Filippo Mantovani	KTM					Ret	30	14	12	12	9	DNQ	19	C	15							9	9	69
24	(Sweden) Sandro Sols	Gas Gas											11	6			8	6	24	12					62
25	(Latvia) Jēkabs Kubuliņš	Yamaha					16	23					17	16			10	21	10	4	20	15			61
26	(Netherlands) Jayson van Drunen	Yamaha	Ret	Ret	27	15	Ret	Ret	19	21	Ret	34	Ret	18	C	36	Ret	7	13	Ret	17	16	Ret	7	56
27	(Norway) Pelle Gundersen	Husqvarna	10	17	8	13	23	Ret	Ret	13	DNS	DNS	13	22	C	DNQ	DNS	DNS							52
28	(Israel) Ofir Casey Tzemach	Husqvarna	Ret	Ret	11	20	22	Ret	Ret	16	20	21	21	Ret	C	23	20	22	22	14	11	Ret	15	18	44
29	(Netherlands) Dex Kooiker	Yamaha	16	35	Ret	12	21	Ret	9	31	Ret	6	Ret	Ret											41
30	(Chile) César Paine Díaz	KTM	18	26	34	34	DNQ	DNQ	23	18	11	17	DNQ	DNQ	C	31					14	14			34
31	(Italy) Gennaro Utech	Fantic	Ret	9	19	17									C	18									21
32	(United Kingdom) Josh Vail	KTM	7	Ret							21	16													19
33	(United Kingdom) Jamie Keith	Yamaha																	4	Ret					18
34	(France) Amaury Maindru	Gas Gas	21	20	22	11	18	21	Ret	DNS			28	30	C	26									14
35	(Italy) Riccardo Pini	Fantic	DNQ	24	30	28											32	29	27	17	Ret	Ret	11	11	14
36	(Sweden) Casper Lindmark	Husqvarna	30	33	DNQ	DNQ	DNQ	25	29	34	DNQ	DNQ	32	Ret			Ret	12			27	26	17	25	13
37	(Spain) Bruno Miró	Gas Gas			23	22	19	19	28	29	DNQ	DNQ			C	33					12	Ret			13
38	(Belgium) Maxime Lucas	KTM			DNQ	31					Ret	26													13
38	(Belgium) Maxime Lucas	TM													C	29	14	15	Ret	30					13
39	(France) Félix Cardineau	Yamaha					24	26	DNQ	DNQ	18	12													12
40	(Germany) Jonathan Frank	Gas Gas	19	23	25	24	17	Ret	17	25	Ret	32	19	31	C	21									12
41	(Latvia) Tomass Šaicāns	Gas Gas	Ret	34	21	Ret							Ret	33					12	Ret					9
42	(Italy) Francesco Zoriaco	Fantic	DNQ	DNQ	28	32	27	24	DNQ	30	Ret	36	DNQ	DNQ	C	32	DNQ	DNQ	DNQ	DNQ	24	12			9
43	(Czech Republic) Václav Janout	KTM	DNQ	DNQ	14	27					DNQ	DNQ							26	26	19	Ret			9
44	(Netherlands) Mick Kennedy	Gas Gas	27	29	20	23					DNQ	DNQ							15	21	22	19			9
45	(Belgium) Tyla Van de Poel	Yamaha	24	19	Ret	DNS											Ret	Ret	16	Ret	DSQ	22	21	19	9
46	(Sweden) Gustav Johnsson	KTM																	25	13					8
47	(Switzerland) Ryan Oppliger	KTM																			13	Ret	Ret	33	8
48	(Italy) Alessandro Traversini	KTM	23	27	DNQ	DNQ	20	22	27	27	DNQ	DNQ					DNQ	DNQ	30	23	Ret	Ret	24	14	8
49	(France) Kylian Maallem	Gas Gas									15	22													6
50	(Spain) Carlos Salvador	Gas Gas	22	30	26	19	31	17	Ret	DNS							31	32	DNQ	DNQ	Ret	Ret			6
51	(Italy) Andrea Roberti	KTM													C	16									5
52	(South Africa) Trey Cox	KTM									25	28									25	17			4
53	(Lithuania) Marius Adomaitis	Gas Gas											31	25					17	Ret	Ret	Ret			4
54	(Italy) Giorgio Orlando	Yamaha	Ret	DNS											C	24	DNS	34	29	28	18	Ret			3
55	(Finland) Onni Jaakonsaari	KTM											23	24			25	19							2
56	(Belgium) Emile De Baere	Yamaha													C	DNQ			Ret	19					2
57	(France) Yannis Lopez	Husqvarna	26	28	DNQ	DNQ			26	23	24	20									21	21			1
58	(Finland) Simo Koskinen	Husqvarna											Ret	28			22	20							1
	(France) Liam Bruneau	KTM	DNQ	DNQ	24	21	30	Ret	22	Ret	Ret	27	DNQ	DNQ	C	DNQ									0
	(Italy) Mattia Barbieri	Fantic	DNQ	DNQ	Ret	25			DNQ	DNQ	22	Ret	29	21	C	25									0
	(Spain) Marino Villar	Gas Gas																					22	21	0
	(Sweden) Hugo Bergqvist	Fantic											27	Ret			21	27							0
	(Estonia) Travis Leok	Husqvarna			29	35							22	29			29	Ret			23	27			0
	(Spain) Pablo Lara	Gas Gas					29	Ret	25	26	28	33											26	22	0
	(Denmark) Frederik Rahn Stampe	Yamaha	25	22	DNQ	DNQ							DNQ	DNQ			28	Ret	DNQ	DNQ					0
	(Israel) Ben Almagor	KTM									26	23			C	27									0
	(Bulgaria) Vencislav Toshev	Gas Gas	DNQ	DNQ	DNQ	DNQ											27	28	Ret	DNS	DNQ	DNQ	DSQ	23	0
	(Norway) Marius Nordbø	KTM																					23	Ret	0
	(Spain) Juan Izaguirre	KTM					26	28	Ret	32	Ret	35			C	DNQ			DNQ	DNQ	DNQ	DNQ	25	24	0
	(Sweden) Otto Gustavsson	Husqvarna											26	26			26	24							0
	(Spain) Enzo Badenas	Gas Gas			32	26	Ret	29	24	Ret											DSQ	Ret	Ret	30	0
	(Denmark) Jacob Bloch	Husqvarna															DNQ	DNQ	Ret	24					0
	(Sweden) Alve Callemo	Husqvarna															24	Ret							0
	(Italy) Riccardo Perrone	Yamaha																	DNQ	DNQ	DSQ	24			0
	(Belgium) Harry Seel	Gas Gas	DNQ	DNQ	31	30	25	Ret	31	28	DNQ	DNQ	DNQ	DNQ	C	Ret	DNQ	DNQ	DNQ	DNQ	Ret	Ret			0
	(Italy) Michael Conte	Fantic	DNQ	DNQ	DNQ	DNQ	DNQ	DNQ	DNQ	DNQ	DNQ	DNQ	DNQ	DNQ	C	30	DNQ	DNQ	DNQ	DNQ	DNQ	25	33	35	0
	(Belgium) Brent Van de Walle	Yamaha									DNQ	DNQ	DNQ	DNQ	C	DNQ			32	25	DNQ	DNQ			0
	(Venezuela) César Aponte	Gas Gas					DNQ	DNQ	DNQ	DNQ													31	26	0
	(Spain) Valentino Vázquez	KTM					DNQ	27	Ret	33	29	31											28	Ret	0
	(France) Sleny Goyer	Yamaha																					27	29	0
	(Colombia) Miguel Ángel Rojas	Gas Gas																	DNQ	DNQ	DNQ	DNQ	30	27	0
	(France) Ilyes Ortiz	KTM									27	30													0
	(Netherlands) Sem Taspinar	Yamaha																	DNQ	27					0
	(Switzerland) Noe Zumstein	Yamaha	29	31			28	Ret	30	Ret					C	28					DNQ	DNQ			0
	(Spain) Alejandro Torres	Yamaha																					29	28	0
	(Spain) Unai Samper	Gas Gas	28	32																					0
	(Germany) Max Meyer	Yamaha													C	DNQ					28	DNS			0
	(Switzerland) Eliot Vidalenc	KTM									Ret	29													0
	(Switzerland) Noryn Polsini	Gas Gas																			29	Ret			0
	(Poland) Dawid Zaremba	Yamaha			DNQ	DNQ											30	31							0
	(Finland) Jan Jasper Kõiv	Gas Gas											30	Ret											0
	(Spain) Xavier Camps	Gas Gas	DNQ	DNQ	35	Ret	32	31	Ret	DNS			34	32	C	DNQ									0
	(France) Simon de Ruyter	Yamaha	DNQ	DNQ	DNQ	DNQ											DNQ	DNQ	31	Ret					0
	(Argentina) Juan Felipe García	Yamaha																					Ret	31	0
	(Portugal) Gonçalo Cardoso	Husqvarna	DNQ	DNQ			DNQ	DNQ	DNQ	35	DNQ	DNQ					DNQ	DNQ	DNQ	DNQ			32	34	0
	(Italy) Riccardo Marchini	KTM																					Ret	32	0
	(Belgium) Seth Priem	Gas Gas			DNQ	DNQ	DNQ	DNQ	DNQ	DNQ	DNQ	DNQ			C	34	33	33	DNQ	DNQ	DNQ	DNQ			0
	(Spain) Bruno Puerto	TM	DNQ	DNQ	33	33	DNQ	DNQ	DNQ	DNQ															0
	(Spain) José Hernández	Fantic	DNQ	DNQ	DNQ	DNQ	DNQ	DNQ	DNQ	DNQ	DNQ	DNQ	DNQ	DNQ	C	DNQ	DNQ	DNQ	DNQ	DNQ	DNQ	DNQ	34	36	0
	(Italy) Davide Zanone	Beta													C	35					DNQ	DNQ			0
	(Slovenia) Miha Vrh	Fantic			DNQ	DNQ									C	37					DNQ	DNQ			0
	(Spain) Oleguer Riba	Yamaha							DNQ	DNQ					C	38									0
	(Belgium) Ian Ampoorter	Gas Gas					Ret	DNS									Ret	DNS							0
	(Belgium) Tom Dukerts	Gas Gas			DNQ	DNQ													Ret	Ret	DNQ	DNQ			0
	(Netherlands) Mike Visser	Gas Gas																	Ret	Ret					0
	(Norway) Markus Sommerstad	KTM															DNQ	DNQ	Ret	DNS					0
	(Finland) Arttu Sahlstén	KTM											Ret	DNS											0
	(Denmark) Emil Lodal	Gas Gas			DNQ	DNQ					DNQ	DNQ					DNQ	DNQ	DNQ	DNQ	DNQ	DNQ			0
	(Italy) Federico Salvi	Gas Gas	DNQ	DNQ	DNQ	DNQ									C	DNQ			DNQ	DNQ	DNQ	DNQ			0
	(Germany) Anthony Caspari	KTM			DNQ	DNQ							DNQ	DNQ	C	DNQ			DNQ	DNQ	DNQ	DNQ			0
	(Italy) Alex Gruber	KTM	DNQ	DNQ	DNQ	DNQ													DNQ	DNQ	DNQ	DNQ			0
	(United Kingdom) Jake Davies	KTM			DNQ	DNQ	DNQ	DNQ									DNQ	DNQ	DNQ	DNQ					0
	(Andorra) Martin Kettlitz	KTM	DNQ	DNQ	DNQ	DNQ			DNQ	DNQ															0
	(United Kingdom) Drew Stock	Yamaha			DNQ	DNQ					DNQ	DNQ							DNQ	DNQ					0
	(Belgium) Arthur Decouter	Gas Gas			DNQ	DNQ													DNQ	DNQ	DNQ	DNQ			0
	(Netherlands) Rizan Hartman	KTM					DNQ	DNQ											DNQ	DNQ	DNQ	DNQ			0
	(Indonesia) Angga Lubis	TM					DNQ	DNQ	DNQ	DNQ	DNQ	DNQ													0
	(Spain) Oscar Quiros	Husqvarna																	DNQ	DNQ	DNQ	DNQ	DNQ	DNQ	0
	(Italy) Luca Colonnelli	Fantic	DNQ	DNQ	DNQ	DNQ									C	DNQ									0
	(Estonia) Kaspar Uibu	KTM	DNQ	DNQ	DNQ	DNQ																			0
	(South Africa) Ryan Adler	TM	DNQ	DNQ	DNQ	DNQ																			0
	(Belgium) Uwe De Waele	Gas Gas			DNQ	DNQ													DNQ	DNQ					0
	(Belgium) Seppe Giuliani	Gas Gas			DNQ	DNQ													DNQ	DNQ					0
	(France) Enzo Lefebvre	TM					DNQ	DNQ	DNQ	DNQ															0
	(Spain) Marc Roma	KTM					DNQ	DNQ	DNQ	DNQ															0
	(Belgium) Liam Pölöskei	Fantic									DNQ	DNQ							DNQ	DNQ					0
	(Italy) Davide Onoscuri	Yamaha															DNQ	DNQ	DNQ	DNQ					0
	(Belgium) Thybe Ceulemans	Yamaha															DNQ	DNQ	DNQ	DNQ					0
	(Slovenia) Lukas Osek	KTM			DNQ	DNQ									C	DNQ									0
	(Germany) Toni Ziemer	Fantic																			DNQ	DNQ			0
	(France) Elvis Gaulon	Yamaha																			DNQ	DNQ			0
	(Switzerland) Tristan Blanc	Yamaha																			DNQ	DNQ			0
	(France) Jules Blanchard	KTM																			DNQ	DNQ			0
	(Switzerland) Dany Henzer	Yamaha																			DNQ	DNQ			0
	(Sweden) William Lidnert	KTM															DNQ	DNQ							0
	(Sweden) Gustav Axelsson	Gas Gas															DNQ	DNQ							0
	(Denmark) Emil Gordon Rohmann	Yamaha															DNQ	DNQ							0
	(Norway) Andre Marthinsen	KTM															DNQ	DNQ							0
	(Norway) Edvard Hestvik	KTM															DNQ	DNQ							0
	(Norway) Theodor Imenes	Husqvarna															DNQ	DNQ							0
	(Norway) Isak Engelin	KTM															DNQ	DNQ							0
	(Norway) Brede Gultvedt	Yamaha															DNQ	DNQ							0
	(Norway) Edgar Bjerkeli	KTM															DNQ	DNQ							0
	(Norway) Brian Hellestø	Husqvarna															DNQ	DNQ							0
	(Norway) Terje Bystrøm	KTM															DNQ	DNQ							0
	(Latvia) Alberts Knapšis	Husqvarna											DNQ	DNQ											0
	(Sweden) Pontus Girmalm	KTM											DNQ	DNQ											0
	(Latvia) Ralfs Spila	Gas Gas											DNQ	DNQ											0
	(Poland) Maciej Chlewiński	Husqvarna											DNQ	DNQ											0
	(Latvia) Raivo Laicāns	Gas Gas											DNQ	DNQ											0
	(France) Emerick Vergote	Gas Gas									DNQ	DNQ													0
	(France) Dylan Conti	Husqvarna									DNQ	DNQ													0
	(France) Raphaël Darne	KTM									DNQ	DNQ													0
	(Portugal) Tomás Santos	Gas Gas					DNQ	DNQ																	0
	(Portugal) Bernardo Pinto	Yamaha					DNQ	DNQ																	0
	(Portugal) Rodrigo Barros	Yamaha					DNQ	DNQ																	0
	(Portugal) Filipe Saúde	KTM					DNQ	DNQ																	0
	(Portugal) Vasco Salgado	Yamaha					DNQ	DNQ																	0
	(Portugal) Miguel Caridade	Yamaha					DNQ	DNQ																	0
	(Slovenia) Gal Geršak	Yamaha			DNQ	DNQ																			0
	(Poland) Michał Psiuk	Gas Gas			DNQ	DNQ																			0
	(France) Nicolas Clément	KTM			DNQ	DNQ																			0
	(Italy) Paolo Martorano	KTM			DNQ	DNQ																			0
	(Italy) Yuri Lombardo	KTM			DNQ	DNQ																			0
	(Italy) Giovanni Ciampi	Fantic			DNQ	DNQ																			0
	(Belgium) Emerick Pansaerts	Yamaha			DNQ	DNQ																			0
	(Italy) Mattia Piredda	KTM	DNQ	DNQ																					0
	(Hungary) Péter Varga	Gas Gas	DNQ	DNQ																					0
	(Italy) Samuele Piredda	KTM	DNQ	DNQ																					0
	(Italy) Angelo Mosè Cirignotta	Yamaha													C	DNQ									0
	(Italy) Andrea de Luca	KTM													C	DNQ									0
Pos	Rider	Bike	SAR		TRE		POR (Portugal)		GAL		FRA (France)		LAT (Latvia)		ITA (Italy)		SWE (Sweden)		NED (Netherlands)		SUI (Switzerland)		CAS		Points

=== Manufacturers Championship ===
Pos	Bike	SAR		TRE		POR (Portugal)		GAL		FRA (France)		LAT (Latvia)		ITA (Italy)		SWE (Sweden)		NED (Netherlands)		SUI (Switzerland)		CAS		Points
1	Fantic	2	1	1	2	1	2	2	2	1	1	2	3	C	3	6	1	2	2	1	3	1	2	473
2	KTM	1	4	3	1	2	1	3	3	6	3	5	2	C	1	2	3	1	1	3	1	3	1	455
3	Gas Gas	5	3	2	4	3	4	1	4	4	7	1	1	C	10	5	6	7	5	2	2	10	10	377
4	Yamaha	3	2	9	10	6	5	5	1	2	4	6	9	C	6	1	5	4	3	15	11	4	6	347
5	TM	DNQ	DNQ	10	5	9	6	20	10	17	8	12	20	C	2	9	15	Ret	30			6	8	161
6	Husqvarna	10	17	8	13	22	25	26	13	20	20	13	22	C	23	20	12	22	14	11	21	15	18	90
	Beta													C	35					DNQ	DNQ			0
Pos	Bike	SAR		TRE		POR (Portugal)		GAL		FRA (France)		LAT (Latvia)		ITA (Italy)		SWE (Sweden)		NED (Netherlands)		SUI (Switzerland)		CAS		Points

== EMXOpen ==
A 1-round calendar for the 2024 season was announced on 12 October 2023. EMXOpen is for riders competing on 2-stroke and 4-stroke motorcycles up to 450cc.

=== Calendar ===
Round	Date	Grand Prix	Location	Race 1 Winner	Race 2 Winner	Round Winner	Report
1	28 July	Flanders	Lommel	(Netherlands) Micha-Boy de Waal	(Finland) Jere Haavisto	(Czech Republic) Jakub Terešák	

=== Entry list ===
Team	Constructor	No	Rider
	Yamaha	6	(Netherlands) Lars Looman
Mills Racing	Yamaha	7	(United Kingdom) Christopher Mills
Moto-Cycle Racing	Gas Gas	10	(Republic of Ireland) Jason Meara
Millionaire Racing Team	Honda	22	(Italy) Giuseppe Tropepe
JP Xtreme Xperience	Yamaha	29	(Norway) Sander Agard-Michelsen
SV Motorsport	Yamaha	32	(United Kingdom) Marcus-Lee Soper
JH-MX Service	Gas Gas	34	(Netherlands) Micha-Boy de Waal
Racing Center Antwerpen	Husqvarna	35	(Belgium) Brent Aerden
JT Construction Motoextreme Honda	Honda	37	(Estonia) Gert Krestinov
Camping Cupido	Yamaha	38	(Netherlands) Marcel Conijn
KTM Silve Racing	KTM	43	(Finland) Matias Vesterinen
KTM Silve Racing	KTM	142	(Finland) Jere Haavisto
Osička MX Team	KTM	45	(Slovakia) Tomáš Kohút
Van Dijck MX Products	Kawasaki	47	(Netherlands) Bram van den Hoek
	KTM	54	(Italy) Simone D'Agata
VisuAlz Production	Husqvarna	66	(Germany) Tim Koch
Sahkar Racing	KTM	75	(Estonia) Hardi Roosiorg
Buitenhuis Racing	Yamaha	77	(Netherlands) Kevin Buitenhuis
DCN-Laurense Motors-Kawasaki	Kawasaki	94	(Netherlands) Sven van der Mierden
Chambers Racing	Husqvarna	95	(United Kingdom) Dan Thornhill
Chambers Racing	Gas Gas	300	(United Kingdom) Ben Franklin
Becker Racing	KTM	101	(Czech Republic) Václav Kovář
Becker Racing	Gas Gas	260	(Germany) Nico Koch
DAM Racing	KTM	108	(Belgium) Dean America
	Husqvarna	113	(Belgium) Jammy Cornil
Van der Velden Motoren	KTM	118	(Netherlands) Joël van Mechelen
Pro-Race Ferro Recycling Team	Husqvarna	121	(Netherlands) Mitchel van den Essenburg
Husqvarna SKS Racing	Husqvarna	128	(Netherlands) Jorn Weeren
MotoLand Seclin	KTM	134	(Belgium) Mattéo Puffet
MX88 Motorsport	KTM	188	(Netherlands) Freek van der Vlist
	Husqvarna	198	(Sweden) Jesper Hansson
Sigmans Yamaha	Yamaha	217	(Netherlands) Teun Cooymans
MX 477	Honda	223	(France) Alexandre Viltard
Enduro Koch Racing	Husqvarna	224	(Czech Republic) Jakub Terešák
Yamaha Auto-Motos Saint-Dizier	Yamaha	234	(France) Bogdan Krajewski
A-Team Neustrelitz	KTM	244	(Germany) Max Bülow
Lexa MX Racing Team	Husqvarna	249	(United Kingdom) John Adamson
MS Motorcycles	Husqvarna	290	(Germany) Joshua Völker
Nobis MX Team	KTM	303	(Netherlands) Krijn van Vroenhoven
Team 101%	Yamaha	411	(Estonia) Erki Kahro
Twenty Racing Suspension Gas Gas	Gas Gas	444	(Netherlands) Jeremy Knuiman
Brouwer Motors	KTM	537	(Netherlands) Damian Wedage
KTM Eesti	KTM	651	(Estonia) Meico Vettik
MX-Handel Racing	Husqvarna	733	(Estonia) Kaarel Tilk
Laurense Motors	Kawasaki	841	(Netherlands) Robert Fobbe
APM Metaalservice	Yamaha	867	(Belgium) Dimitri Van de Sanden
	Gas Gas	911	(Netherlands) Henk Pater

=== Riders Championship ===
Pos	Rider	Motorcycle	FLA (Flanders)		Points
1	(Czech Republic) Jakub Terešák	Husqvarna	4	2	40
2	(Finland) Jere Haavisto	KTM	8	1	38
3	(Estonia) Meico Vettik	KTM	3	4	38
4	(Estonia) Gert Krestinov	Honda	6	3	35
5	(Netherlands) Freek van der Vlist	KTM	2	9	34
6	(Netherlands) Sven van der Mierden	Kawasaki	5	6	31
7	(Germany) Nico Koch	Gas Gas	9	5	28
8	(Belgium) Mattéo Puffet	KTM	10	7	25
9	(Netherlands) Micha-Boy de Waal	Gas Gas	1	Ret	25
10	(Netherlands) Jeremy Knuiman	KTM	7	12	23
11	(Slovakia) Tomáš Kohút	KTM	13	8	21
12	(Germany) Tim Koch	Husqvarna	12	10	20
13	(Netherlands) Joël van Mechelen	KTM	14	11	17
14	(Finland) Matias Vesterinen	KTM	15	16	11
15	(Belgium) Brent Aerden	Husqvarna	11	Ret	10
16	(Netherlands) Marcel Conijn	Yamaha	Ret	13	8
17	(United Kingdom) John Adamson	Husqvarna	17	17	8
18	(Estonia) Kaarel Tilk	Husqvarna	Ret	14	7
19	(United Kingdom) Dan Thornhill	Husqvarna	20	15	7
20	(Norway) Sander Agard-Michelsen	Yamaha	16	19	7
21	(Republic of Ireland) Jason Meara	Gas Gas	19	18	5
22	(Netherlands) Damian Wedage	KTM	18	20	4
	(Estonia) Hardi Roosiorg	KTM	Ret	21	0
	(France) Bogdan Krajewski	Yamaha	21	Ret	0
	(Belgium) Dimitri Van de Sanden	Yamaha	23	22	0
	(Estonia) Erki Kahro	Yamaha	22	25	0
	(Netherlands) Bram van den Hoek	Kawasaki	24	23	0
	(United Kingdom) Ben Franklin	Gas Gas	DNQ	24	0
	(Italy) Giuseppe Tropepe	Honda	25	Ret	0
	(Sweden) Jesper Hansson	Husqvarna	28	26	0
	(Netherlands) Robert Fobbe	Kawasaki	26	Ret	0
	(Netherlands) Kevin Buitenhuis	Yamaha	27	28	0
	(France) Alexandre Viltard	Honda	30	27	0
	(Netherlands) Teun Cooymans	Yamaha	29	30	0
	(Germany) Max Bülow	KTM	31	29	0
	(Netherlands) Jorn Weeren	Husqvarna	Ret	31	0
	(United Kingdom) Marcus-Lee Soper	Yamaha	32	32	0
	(Czech Republic) Václav Kovář	KTM	Ret	Ret	0
	(Netherlands) Lars Looman	Yamaha	Ret	Ret	0
	(United Kingdom) Christopher Mills	Yamaha	Ret	DNS	0
	(Netherlands) Henk Pater	Gas Gas	DNQ	Ret	0
	(Netherlands) Mitchel van den Essenburg	Husqvarna	DSQ	DNS	0
	(Netherlands) Krijn van Vroenhoven	KTM	DNQ	DNQ	0
	(Belgium) Jammy Cornil	Husqvarna	DNQ	DNQ	0
	(Germany) Joshua Völker	Husqvarna	DNQ	DNQ	0
	(Belgium) Dean America	KTM	DNQ	DNQ	0
	(Italy) Simone d'Agata	KTM	DNQ	DNQ	0
Pos	Rider	Motorcycle	FLA (Flanders)		Points

=== Manufacturers Championship ===
Pos	Motorcycle	FLA (Flanders)		Points
1	KTM	2	1	47
2	Gas Gas	1	5	41
3	Husqvarna	4	2	40
4	Honda	6	3	35
5	Kawasaki	5	6	31
6	Yamaha	16	13	13
Pos	Motorcycle	FLA (Flanders)		Points

== EMX2T ==
A 1-round calendar for the 2024 season was announced on 12 October 2023. EMX2T is for riders competing on 2-stroke motorcycles of 250cc.

=== Calendar ===
Round	Date	Grand Prix	Location	Race 1 Winner	Race 2 Winner	Round Winner	Report
1	21 July	Czech Republic	Loket	(Austria) Marcel Stauffer	(Austria) Marcel Stauffer	(Austria) Marcel Stauffer	

=== Entry list ===
Team	Constructor	No	Rider
Top Cross TCS Racing Team	KTM	11	(Romania) Zoltan Ördög
Bloms MX Racing Team	Husqvarna	13	(Sweden) Adam Fridlund
Motosports Racing Team	Husqvarna	16	(Latvia) Kārlis Sabulis
Team Castellari	Gas Gas	18	(Italy) Giacomo Bosi
Team Castellari	Gas Gas	62	(Italy) Davide Zampino
JP Xtreme Xperience	Yamaha	29	(Norway) Sander Agard-Michelsen
	Yamaha	32	(Czech Republic) Šimon Řezníček
	KTM	34	(Italy) Iacopo Fabbri
Hofstede MX Team	Husqvarna	38	(Netherlands) Karl Timmerman
Ghidinelli Racing	Yamaha	39	(Italy) Maurizio Scollo
Ghidinelli Racing	Yamaha	744	(Morocco) Saad Soulimani
	KTM	44	(Czech Republic) Marek Krejčí
	Yamaha	52	(Belgium) Emile De Baere
Steels Dr. Jack TM Racing	TM	70	(Italy) Brando Rispoli
Luke's Racing - Hertrampf Gruppe	KTM	72	(Lithuania) Neilas Pecatauskas
Team SevenSevenSix MX School	Husqvarna	85	(Germany) Lorenz Föhlisch
JG Moto Action MotoproX Team	KTM	90	(Czech Republic) Jiří Hendrych
JG Moto Action MotoproX Team	KTM	117	(Czech Republic) Jan Wagenknecht
JG Moto Action MotoproX Team	KTM	191	(Czech Republic) Jaromír Romančík
JG Moto Action MotoproX Team	KTM	420	(Italy) Andrea Rossi
JG Moto Action MotoproX Team	KTM	531	(Austria) Florian Hellrigl
	KTM	98	(Netherlands) Dylan Kroon
Becker Racing	KTM	101	(Czech Republic) Václav Kovář
MX110Racing	KTM	110	(Estonia) Richard Paat
Orion Racing Team	KTM	111	(Czech Republic) Petr Bartoš
MX Team Znojmo SD Install Racing	Husqvarna	119	(Czech Republic) Jiří Matějec
Team Fix Racing	TM	127	(Italy) Micol Pacini
Team Fix Racing	TM	330	(Italy) Samuele Casadei
Team Lillemans MC	Yamaha	142	(Sweden) Franz Löfquist
Terrapro Racing	TM	162	(Czech Republic) Tomáš Ptáček
HTS KTM	KTM	214	(Hungary) Bence Pergel
	Beta	263	(Italy) Alfredo Memoli
Q Racing Team	Gas Gas	271	(Czech Republic) Stanislav Vašíček
JK Racing Yamaha	Yamaha	284	(Italy) Giorgio Orlando
Mulderen FlevoTrans B.V. Tollebeek	Husqvarna	400	(Netherlands) Roan Tolsma
Osička MX Team	KTM	401	(Austria) Marcel Stauffer
ZL N2P	KTM	472	(Czech Republic) Martin Závrský
Mqworld Factory Racing Team	KTM	753	(Italy) Patrick Busatto
AMIC Energy MX Team by Kowalski	Gas Gas	841	(Poland) Jakub Kowalski
KTM Kosak Team	Fantic	881	(Germany) Cedric Schick
Mecamotor KTM	KTM	938	(Brazil) Rodolfo Bicalho
Austria Suspension Racing by Motorrad Waldmann	Fantic	991	(Austria) Marvin Salzer

=== Riders Championship ===
Pos	Rider	Motorcycle	CZE (Czech Republic)		Points
1	(Austria) Marcel Stauffer	KTM	1	1	50
2	(Hungary) Bence Pergel	KTM	2	2	44
3	(Czech Republic) Václav Kovář	KTM	6	3	35
4	(Austria) Florian Hellrigl	KTM	4	7	32
5	(Latvia) Kārlis Sabulis	Husqvarna	5	6	31
6	(Czech Republic) Jan Wagenknecht	KTM	11	4	28
7	(Sweden) Adam Fridlund	Husqvarna	7	9	26
8	(Italy) Brando Rispoli	TM	12	5	25
9	(Italy) Andrea Rossi	KTM	9	8	25
10	(Morocco) Saad Soulimani	Yamaha	3	Ret	20
11	(Czech Republic) Jiří Matějec	Husqvarna	14	11	17
12	(Czech Republic) Petr Bartoš	KTM	13	15	14
13	(Czech Republic) Jaromír Romančík	KTM	8	Ret	13
14	(Italy) Iacopo Fabbri	KTM	18	12	12
15	(Austria) Marvin Salzer	Fantic	23	10	11
16	(Italy) Alfredo Memoli	Beta	10	Ret	11
17	(Norway) Sander Agard-Michelsen	Yamaha	24	13	8
18	(Estonia) Richard Paat	KTM	17	17	8
19	(Italy) Patrick Busatto	KTM	31	14	7
20	(Italy) Davide Zampino	Gas Gas	19	16	7
21	(Italy) Maurizio Scollo	Yamaha	15	Ret	6
22	(Czech Republic) Jiří Hendrych	KTM	16	Ret	5
23	(Italy) Micol Pacini	TM	25	18	3
24	(Belgium) Emile De Baere	Yamaha	38	19	2
25	(Czech Republic) Stanislav Vašíček	Gas Gas	20	20	2
	(Netherlands) Roan Tolsma	Husqvarna	21	24	0
	(Brazil) Rodolfo Bicalho	KTM	Ret	21	0
	(Italy) Giorgio Orlando	Yamaha	26	22	0
	(Romania) Zoltan Ördög	KTM	22	27	0
	(Sweden) Franz Löfquist	Yamaha	27	23	0
	(Italy) Giacomo Bosi	Gas Gas	28	25	0
	(Netherlands) Karl Timmerman	Husqvarna	35	26	0
	(Netherlands) Dylan Kroon	KTM	30	28	0
	(Czech Republic) Tomáš Ptáček	TM	29	30	0
	(Czech Republic) Marek Krejčí	KTM	32	29	0
	(Italy) Samuele Casadei	TM	36	31	0
	(Germany) Cedric Schick	Fantic	34	32	0
	(Poland) Jakub Kowalski	Gas Gas	33	Ret	0
	(Lithuania) Neilas Pecatauskas	Gas Gas	37	DNS	0
	(Czech Republic) Martin Závrský	KTM	DSQ	Ret	0
	(Germany) Lorenz Föhlisch	Husqvarna	DNQ	DNQ	0
	(Czech Republic) Šimon Řezníček	Yamaha	DNQ	DNQ	0
Pos	Rider	Motorcycle	CZE (Czech Republic)		Points

=== Manufacturers Championship ===
Pos	Motorcycle	CZE (Czech Republic)		Points
1	KTM	1	1	50
2	Husqvarna	5	6	31
3	Yamaha	3	13	28
4	TM	12	5	25
5	Fantic	23	10	11
6	Beta	10	Ret	11
7	Gas Gas	19	16	7
Pos	Motorcycle	CZE (Czech Republic)		Points

== EMX85 ==
A 1-round calendar for the 2024 season was announced on 12 October 2023. EMX85 is for riders competing on 2-stroke motorcycles of 85cc.

=== Calendar ===
Round	Date	Grand Prix	Location	Race 1 Winner	Race 2 Winner	Round Winner	Report
1	21 July	Czech Republic	Loket	(France) Sleny Goyer	(Latvia) Jēkabs Hudolejs	(France) Sleny Goyer	

=== Participants ===
Riders qualified for the championship by finishing in the top 10 in one of the 4 regional 85cc championships.

No	Rider	Motorcycle
9	(Serbia) Ana Kolnookov	Gas Gas
21	(Romania) Sami Alexandru Dumitru	KTM
25	(Hungary) Márk Szőke Eross	Husqvarna
200	(France) Louis Morette	Husqvarna
203	(Italy) Pietro Riganti	Husqvarna
213	(Colombia) Jacobo Roman Velásquez	Gas Gas
214	(France) Léo Diss-Fenard	KTM
224	(Switzerland) Jarno Jansen	Gas Gas
227	(France) Arno Cazet	Gas Gas
265	(Italy) Francesco Assini	Gas Gas
275	(Italy) Edoardo Riganti	Husqvarna
281	(Italy) David Cracco	KTM
292	(Austria) Ricardo Bauer	KTM
306	(Spain) Jordi Alba	KTM
309	(France) Eliot Buysschaert	KTM
315	(France) Rafael Mennillo	KTM
324	(Italy) Michele Piccoli	KTM
326	(France) Kenzo Ferez	KTM
350	(France) Sleny Goyer	Gas Gas
353	(Italy) Andrea Uccellini	Husqvarna
367	(Spain) Pau Caudet Ruíz	Husqvarna
385	(Spain) Jorge Salvador	KTM
397	(Slovenia) Alex Novak	KTM
400	(Netherlands) Kenzo Jaspers	Husqvarna
402	(Denmark) Casey Karstrøm	KTM
410	(Netherlands) Jeremy Bouchee	Husqvarna
415	(United Kingdom) Blake Ward-Clarke	KTM
464	(Denmark) Bertram Thorius	Yamaha
466	(Germany) Simon Hahn	KTM
516	(Germany) Luca Frank	KTM
520	(Slovakia) Maxim Zimmerman	Husqvarna
548	(United Kingdom) Hayden Statt	KTM
549	(Denmark) Storm Maymann	Yamaha
577	(Finland) Viktor Leppälä	KTM
578	(Germany) Neo Nindelt	Gas Gas
584	(Netherlands) Jannes Vos	KTM
597	(Germany) Raphael Hellmuth	Husqvarna
602	(Estonia) Aston Allas	Husqvarna
609	(Sweden) Milo Brännström	Husqvarna
611	(Estonia) Lucas Leok	Husqvarna
712	(Latvia) Rainers Grasis	Husqvarna
722	(Latvia) Jēkabs Hudolejs	Gas Gas
732	(Latvia) Sebastians Olsens	KTM
748	(Sweden) Wilhelm Löfgren	KTM
751	(Latvia) Martins Cīrulis	Husqvarna
757	(Latvia) Toms Dankerts	Husqvarna
771	(Latvia) Patriks Cīrulis	Husqvarna
775	(Estonia) Marten Raud	Husqvarna

=== Riders Championship ===
Pos	Rider	Motorcycle	CZE (Czech Republic)		Points
1	(France) Sleny Goyer	Gas Gas	1	5	41
2	(Latvia) Jēkabs Hudolejs	Gas Gas	11	1	35
3	(Italy) Edoardo Riganti	Husqvarna	3	7	34
4	(Estonia) Lucas Leok	Husqvarna	7	4	32
5	(Italy) Andrea Uccellini	Husqvarna	10	3	31
6	(Italy) David Cracco	KTM	2	13	30
7	(France) Léo Diss-Fenard	KTM	5	8	29
8	(Austria) Ricardo Bauer	KTM	4	10	29
9	(Estonia) Aston Allas	KTM	9	9	24
10	(Spain) Jordi Alba	KTM	36	2	22
11	(Spain) Pau Caudet	Husqvarna	16	6	20
12	(France) Kenzo Ferez	KTM	13	12	17
13	(Finland) Viktor Leppälä	KTM	6	23	15
14	(France) Rafael Mennillo	KTM	17	11	14
15	(Spain) Jorge Salvador	KTM	8	22	13
16	(Denmark) Storm Maymann	Yamaha	15	15	12
17	(Denmark) Bertram Thorius	Yamaha	12	18	12
18	(Netherlands) Kenzo Jaspers	Husqvarna	22	14	7
19	(France) Eliot Buysschaert	KTM	14	Ret	7
20	(Latvia) Toms Dankerts	Husqvarna	25	16	5
21	(Italy) Pietro Riganti	Husqvarna	38	17	4
22	(Germany) Neo Nindelt	Gas Gas	18	35	3
23	(Denmark) Casey Karstrøm	KTM	23	19	2
24	(Germany) Simon Hahn	KTM	19	29	2
25	(Latvia) Patriks Cīrulis	Husqvarna	33	20	1
26	(Switzerland) Jarno Jansen	Gas Gas	20	32	1
	(Italy) Michele Piccoli	KTM	21	21	0
	(France) Arno Cazet	Gas Gas	24	27	0
	(Italy) Francesco Assini	Gas Gas	28	24	0
	(Netherlands) Jannes Vos	KTM	27	25	0
	(Latvia) Rainers Grasis	Husqvarna	26	31	0
	(United Kingdom) Hayden Statt	KTM	37	26	0
	(Sweden) Wilhelm Löfgren	KTM	35	28	0
	(Slovakia) Maxim Zimmerman	Husqvarna	29	34	0
	(United Kingdom) Blake Ward-Clarke	KTM	40	30	0
	(Germany) Raphael Hellmuth	Husqvarna	30	Ret	0
	(Slovenia) Alex Novak	KTM	31	37	0
	(France) Louis Morette	Husqvarna	32	33	0
	(Romania) Sami Alexandru Dumitru	KTM	34	36	0
	(Sweden) Milo Brännström	Husqvarna	39	38	0
	(Latvia) Martins Cīrulis	Husqvarna	DNQ	DNQ	0
	(Estonia) Marten Raud	Husqvarna	DNQ	DNQ	0
	(Germany) Luca Frank	KTM	DNQ	DNQ	0
	(Netherlands) Jeremy Bouchee	Husqvarna	DNQ	DNQ	0
	(Sweden) Jack Ljungnér	Husqvarna	DNQ	DNQ	0
	(Hungary) Márk Szőke Eross	Husqvarna	DNQ	DNQ	0
	(Germany) Hannes Lorenz	Gas Gas	DNQ	DNQ	0
	(Colombia) Jacobo Roman	Gas Gas	DNQ	DNQ	0
	(Serbia) Ana Kolnookov	Gas Gas	DNQ	DNQ	0
	(Latvia) Sebastians Olsens	KTM	DNQ	DNQ	0
Pos	Rider	Motorcycle	CZE (Czech Republic)		Points

=== Manufacturers Championship ===
Pos	Motorcycle	CZE (Czech Republic)		Points
1	Gas Gas	1	1	50
2	KTM	2	2	44
3	Husqvarna	3	3	40
4	Yamaha	12	15	15
Pos	Motorcycle	CZE (Czech Republic)		Points

== EMX65 ==
A 1-round calendar for the 2024 season was announced on 12 October 2023. EMX65 is for riders competing on 2-stroke motorcycles of 65cc.

=== Calendar ===
Round	Date	Grand Prix	Location	Race 1 Winner	Race 2 Winner	Round Winner	Report
1	21 July	Czech Republic	Loket	(Croatia) Roko Ivandić	(Croatia) Roko Ivandić	(Croatia) Roko Ivandić	

=== Participants ===
Riders qualified for the championship by finishing in the top 10 in one of the 4 regional 65cc championships.

No	Rider	Motorcycle
5	(Serbia) Viktor Kolnookov	KTM
12	(Bulgaria) Nikolay Pavlov	Gas Gas
25	(Bulgaria) Nikola Mutafchiev	KTM
46	(Bulgaria) Georgi Iliev	Gas Gas
74	(Slovakia) Peter Janci	KTM
209	(Italy) Adriano Carbonara	KTM
210	(Spain) Tomás Gallardo	Husqvarna
214	(Austria) Elias Eder	KTM
216	(France) Timoteï Cez	Gas Gas
220	(France) Liam Morette	Husqvarna
224	(Italy) Nicolo' Fratacci	KTM
243	(Croatia) Roko Ivandić	KTM
252	(France) Conrad Pinchon	Yamaha
263	(Slovenia) Svit Vižintin	KTM
277	(Italy) Luigi Perotti	Husqvarna
295	(Italy) Antony Montoneri	KTM
298	(Italy) Lucas Croci	Gas Gas
302	(France) Arthur Annelot	Gas Gas
355	(France) Mathys Aguillo	KTM
356	(Italy) Achille Esposito	Husqvarna
357	(Croatia) Stefan Lenče	Yamaha
360	(Slovenia) Tim Repnik	Husqvarna
372	(Spain) Eleu José	Gas Gas
381	(France) Jordan Valsesia	KTM
394	(France) Timéo Desbordes	Gas Gas
414	(Netherlands) Brett Kastelijn	Yamaha
420	(United Kingdom) Jett Gardiner	KTM
465	(Denmark) Lucas Taylor	Yamaha
474	(Denmark) Willads Gordon	Yamaha
475	(United Kingdom) Cohen Jagielski	Gas Gas
493	(Belgium) Xen Temmerman	Gas Gas
500	(Netherlands) Kash van Hamond	Gas Gas
513	(Germany) Marlo Rach	Gas Gas
525	(Czech Republic) Dominik Hasoň	KTM
537	(Slovakia) Matej Masár	KTM
588	(Germany) Paris Konstantinidis	Gas Gas
591	(Germany) Luca Nierychlo	Husqvarna
599	(Netherlands) Scott van den Boomen	KTM
622	(Estonia) Rasmus Naar	KTM
624	(Latvia) Dominiks Sēlis	Husqvarna
629	(Estonia) Mikk Mihkel Sepp	Husqvarna
632	(Estonia) Kristofer Valk	Gas Gas
688	(Estonia) Erki Raudnagel	KTM
700	(Estonia) Theo Kolts	Gas Gas
708	(Poland) Tymoteusz Dąbrowski	KTM
722	(Finland) Mikke Lindström	Husqvarna
732	(Latvia) Ričards Jurčenko	Husqvarna
748	(Finland) Sami Oinonen	Gas Gas
777	(Estonia) Karl Kristman	Yamaha
792	(Latvia) Georgs Fridrihsons	Husqvarna

=== Riders Championship ===
Pos	Rider	Motorcycle	CZE (Czech Republic)		Points
1	(Croatia) Roko Ivandić	KTM	1	1	50
2	(Estonia) Theo Kolts	Gas Gas	3	2	42
3	(Germany) Luca Nierychlo	Husqvarna	2	4	40
4	(Netherlands) Kash van Hamond	Gas Gas	5	6	31
5	(Estonia) Erki Raudnagel	KTM	4	8	31
6	(Austria) Elias Eder	KTM	14	3	27
7	(France) Liam Morette	Husqvarna	8	7	27
8	(Slovenia) Svit Vižintin	KTM	10	9	23
9	(France) Timoteï Cez	Gas Gas	9	11	22
10	(Denmark) Willads Gordon	Yamaha	6	14	22
11	(United Kingdom) Cohen Jagielski	Gas Gas	Ret	5	16
12	(United Kingdom) Jett Gardiner	KTM	16	10	16
13	(France) Mathys Agullo	KTM	7	19	16
14	(Spain) Eleu José	Gas Gas	13	15	14
15	(Spain) Tomás Gallardo	Husqvarna	12	16	14
16	(Slovenia) Tim Repnik	Husqvarna	18	12	12
17	(Estonia) Rasmus Naar	KTM	17	13	12
18	(France) Conrad Pinchon	Yamaha	11	25	10
19	(Belgium) Xen Temmerman	Gas Gas	15	23	6
20	(Italy) Luigi Perotti	Husqvarna	24	17	4
21	(Italy) Achille Esposito	Husqvarna	26	18	3
22	(Latvia) Ričards Jurčenko	Husqvarna	19	22	2
23	(France) Jordan Valsesia	KTM	32	20	1
24	(Czech Republic) Dominik Hasoň	KTM	20	21	1
	(Latvia) Dominiks Sēlis	Husqvarna	21	39	0
	(Italy) Lucas Croci	Gas Gas	22	29	0
	(Latvia) Georgs Fridrihsons	Husqvarna	23	32	0
	(Poland) Tymoteusz Dąbrowski	KTM	27	24	0
	(Italy) Antony Montoneri	KTM	25	DNS	0
	(Finland) Mikke Lindström	Husqvarna	39	26	0
	(Denmark) Lucas Taylor	Yamaha	37	27	0
	(Croatia) Stefan Lenče	Yamaha	28	31	0
	(Slovakia) Peter Janci	KTM	33	28	0
	(Netherlands) Scott van den Boomen	KTM	29	30	0
	(Finland) Sami Oinonen	Gas Gas	30	36	0
	(Italy) Nicoló Fratacci	KTM	31	34	0
	(Germany) Marlo Rach	Gas Gas	34	33	0
	(France) Timéo Desbordes	Gas Gas	35	Ret	0
	(Estonia) Karl Kristman	Yamaha	DNQ	35	0
	(Italy) Adriano Carbonara	KTM	36	37	0
	(Estonia) Kristofer Valk	Gas Gas	38	38	0
	(France) Arthur Annelot	Gas Gas	DNQ	DNQ	0
	(Slovakia) Matej Masár	KTM	DNQ	DNQ	0
	(Estonia) Mikk Mihkel Sepp	Husqvarna	DNQ	DNQ	0
	(Netherlands) Brett Kastelijn	Yamaha	DNQ	DNQ	0
	(Bulgaria) Georgi Iliev	Gas Gas	DNQ	DNQ	0
	(Germany) Paris Konstantinidis	Gas Gas	DNQ	DNQ	0
	(Serbia) Viktor Kolnookov	KTM	DNQ	DNQ	0
	(Bulgaria) Nikolay Pavlov	Gas Gas	DNQ	DNQ	0
	(Bulgaria) Nikola Mutafchiev	KTM	DNQ	DNQ	0
Pos	Rider	Motorcycle	CZE (Czech Republic)		Points

=== Manufacturers Championship ===
Pos	Motorcycle	CZE (Czech Republic)		Points
1	KTM	1	1	50
2	Gas Gas	3	2	42
3	Husqvarna	2	4	40
4	Yamaha	6	14	22
Pos	Motorcycle	CZE (Czech Republic)		Points
