= Canton of Louvigné-du-Désert =

Coordinates: 48°28′56″N 1°12′05″W

Louvigné-du-Désert
- Former canton
- Interactive map of Louvigné-du-Désert
- Country: France
- Region: Brittany
- Department: Ille-et-Vilaine
- No. of communes: {{{nbcomm}}}
- Disbanded: 2015
- Area: 159 km^{2} (61 sq mi)
- Population (2012): 8,596
  - Density: 54.1/km^{2} (140/sq mi)

The Canton of Louvigné-du-Désert is a former canton of France, in the Ille-et-Vilaine département, in the northeast of the department. It had 8,596 inhabitants (2012). It was disbanded following the French canton reorganisation which came into effect in March 2015. It consisted of 8 communes, which joined the canton of Fougères-2 in 2015.

The canton contained the following communes:

- Louvigné-du-Désert
- Saint-Georges-de-Reintembault
- La Bazouge-du-Désert
- Mellé
- Le Ferré
- Poilley
- Villamée
- Monthault
