= Canton of Fougères-Nord =

Coordinates: 48°21′29″N 1°08′14″W

Fougères-Nord
- Former canton
- Interactive map of Fougères-Nord
- Country: France
- Region: Brittany
- Department: Ille-et-Vilaine
- No. of communes: {{{nbcomm}}}
- Disbanded: 2015
- Population (2012): 22,494

The Canton of Fougères-Nord is a former canton of France, in the Ille-et-Vilaine département. It had 22,494 inhabitants (2012). It was disbanded following the French canton reorganisation which came into effect in March 2015.

The canton comprised the following communes:

- Beaucé
- La Chapelle-Janson
- Fleurigné
- Fougères (fraction)
- Laignelet
- Landéan
- Le Loroux
- Luitré
- Parigné
- La Selle-en-Luitré
