= La Chapelle-Fleurigné =

La Chapelle-Fleurigné Chapel-Flurinieg
- Commune
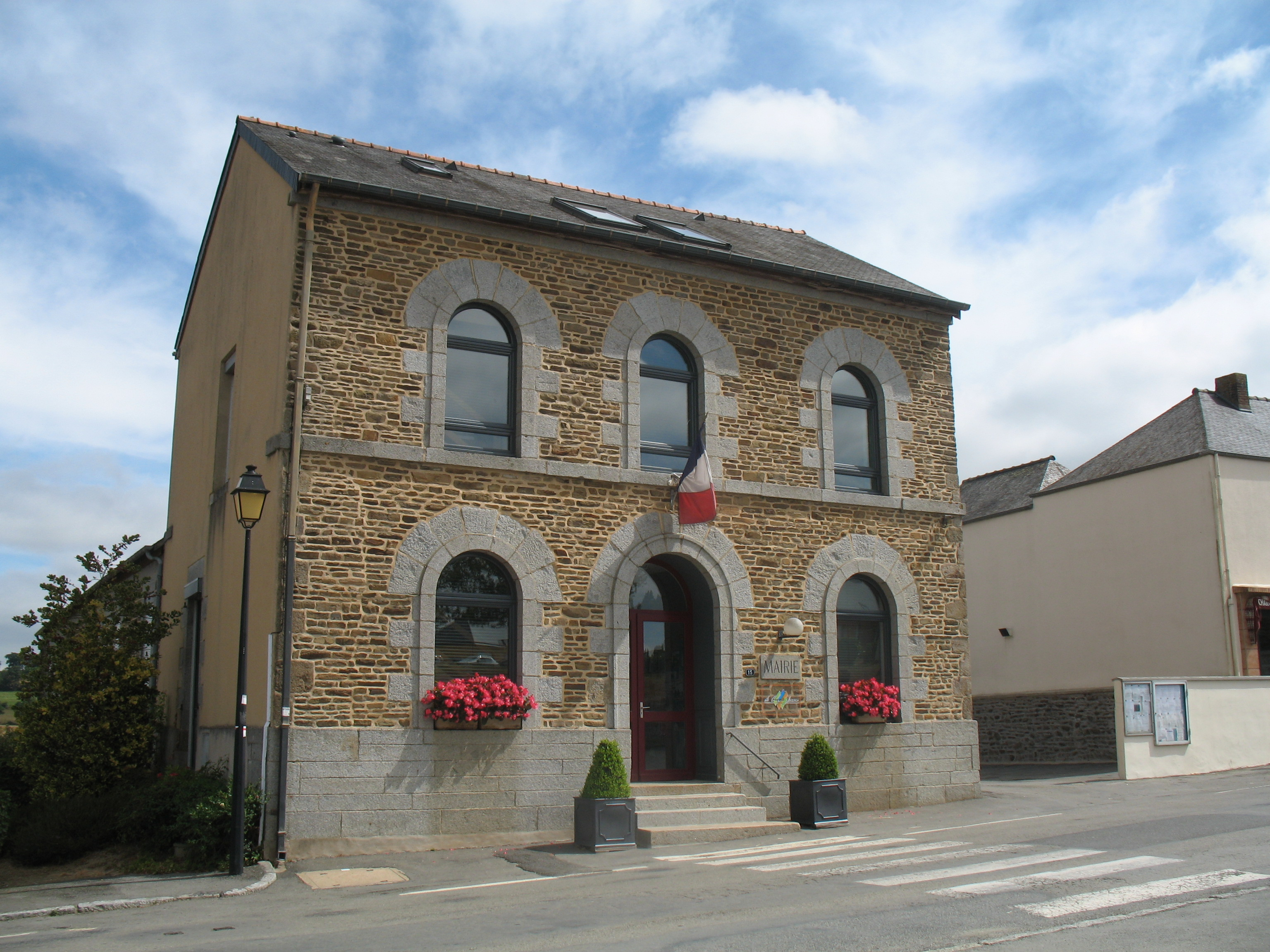
- Town hall
- Location of La Chapelle-Fleurigné
- Location within France Location within Brittany
- Coordinates: 48°20′54″N 1°06′03″W
- Country: France
- Region: Brittany
- Department: Ille-et-Vilaine
- Arrondissement: Fougères-Vitré
- Canton: Fougères-2
- Intercommunality: Fougères Agglomération

Government
  - Mayor (2024–2026): Alain Forêt
- Area^{1}: 45.13 km^{2} (17.42 sq mi)
- Highest elevation: 249 m (817 ft)
- Lowest elevation: 79 m (259 ft)
- Population (2023): 2,451
  - Density: 54.31/km^{2} (140.7/sq mi)
- Time zone: UTC+01:00 (CET)
  - Summer (DST): UTC+02:00 (CEST)
- INSEE/Postal code: 35062 /35133
- ^{1} French Land Register data, which excludes lakes, ponds, glaciers > 1 km^{2} (0.386 sq mi or 247 acres) and river estuaries.

La Chapelle-Fleurigné (French pronunciation: [la ʃapɛl flœʁiɲe]; Breton: Chapel-Flurinieg; Gallo: La Chapèll-Floereinyaè) is a commune in the Ille-et-Vilaine department of Brittany in north-western France. It was established on 1 January 2024, with the merger of the communes of La Chapelle-Janson and Fleurigné.

== History ==
On 1 January 2024, La Chapelle-Janson and Fleurigné merged to create the new commune of La Chapelle Fleurigné, albeit without hyphen contrary to the rules for spelling official names of communes in France. An amending decree was published on 5 October 2023 to comply with it by fixing the toponym La Chapelle-Fleurigné with a hyphen.

== Geography ==
La Chapelle-Fleurigné is located in the northeastearn part of Ille-et-Vilaine, on the border of the department of Mayenne, in the small agricultural region of Fougères. It is located 50.3 km (31.3 mi) from Rennes, the prefecture of the department, and 7 km (4.3 mi) from the sub-prefecture of Fougères. The commune is also part of the Fougères living area. The closest communes are Beaucé (4.1 km), Laignelet (4.3 km), La Selle-en-Luitré (4.5 km), La Pellerine (5.1 km), Le Loroux (5.9 km), Luitré (7.2 km) and Larchamp (7.8 km). The area of La Chapelle-Fleurigné is 45.13 km^{2} (17.42 sq mi) and the altitude of the commune varies from 79 to 249 meters.

The commune passes through the Motte d'Yné river, a right bank tributary of the Couesnon.

=== Climate ===
La Chapelle-Fleurigné features an oceanic climate. This type of climate results in mild temperatures and relatively abundant rainfall (in connection with disturbances coming from the Atlantic Ocean), distributed throughout the year with a slight maximum from October to February.

== Population ==
Population data refer to the commune in its geography as of January 2025.

Historical population
Year	Pop.	±% p.a.
1968	1,782	—
1975	1,717	−0.53%
1982	1,952	+1.85%
1990	2,085	+0.83%
1999	2,052	−0.18%
2007	2,259	+1.21%
2012	2,443	+1.58%
2017	2,424	−0.16%
2023	2,451	+0.18%
Source: INSEE

== See also ==
- Communes of the Ille-et-Vilaine department
