= Marie-Joseph Bissonnier =

French dental surgeon and politician (1940–2023)

Marie-Josep Bissonnier
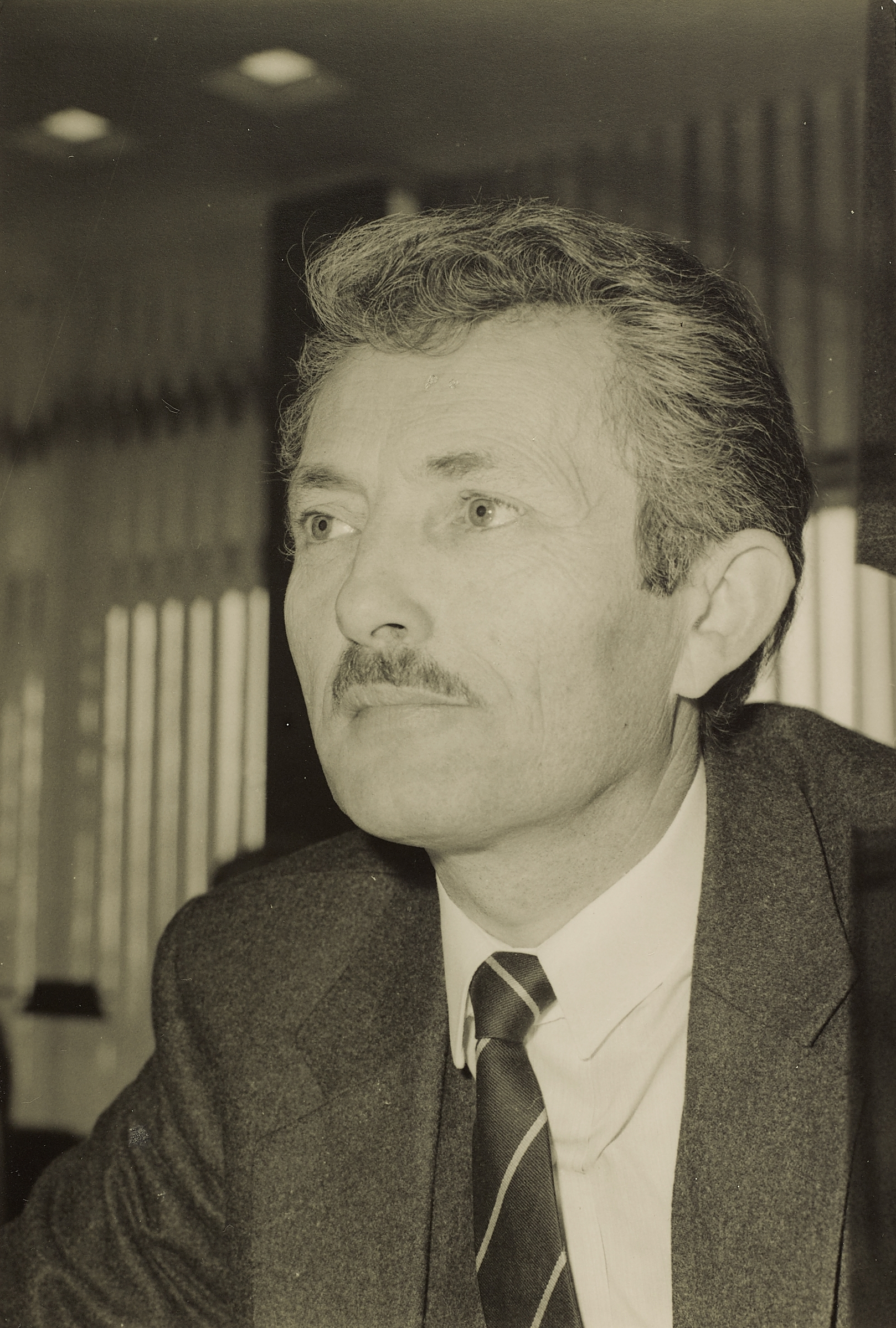
- Bissonnier in 1985

President of the General Council of Ille-et-Vilaine
- In office 23 March 2001 – 1 April 2004
- Preceded by: Pierre Méhaignerie
- Succeeded by: Jean-Louis Tourenne

Member of the General Council of Ille-et-Vilaine
- In office 1979–2004
- Preceded by: Pierre de Rémond du Chelas
- Succeeded by: Rozenn Geffroy
- Constituency: Canton of Plélan-le-Grand

Mayor of Plélan-le-Grand
- In office March 1977 – June 1995
- Preceded by: M. Pinson
- Succeeded by: Joël Turquety

Personal details
- Born: 25 December 1940 Cerdon, Loiret, German-occupied France
- Died: 27 June 2023 (aged 82)
- Party: RPR; UMP
- Education: University of Nantes
- Occupation: Dental surgeon

Marie-Joseph Bissonnier (25 December 1940 – 27 June 2023) was a French dental surgeon and politician of the Rally for the Republic (RPR) and the Union for a Popular Movement (UMP). In the 2001 French cantonal elections, he became President of the General Council of Ille-et-Vilaine, succeeding Pierre Méhaignerie.

== Biography ==
Born in Cerdon, Loiret, Bissonnier was a dental surgeon by profession. He was elected to the General Council of Ille-et-Vilaine from the Canton of Plélan-le-Grand in 1979. He was also Mayor of Plélan-le-Grand from 1977 to 1995. He ran in the 1998 French Senate election on a list with Claude Champaud, Georges Magnant, and Marie Daugan, but was unsuccessful against the preferred right-wing list of Patrick Lassourd, Michel Esneu, Philippe Nogrix, and Yves Fréville.

Bissonnier was elected President of the General Council of Ille-et-Vilaine in 2001, serving until 1 April 2004. He was chosen by his predecessor, Pierre Méhaignerie. In 2004, he was defeated in his re-election bid in the Canton of Plélan-le-Grand by Rozenn Geffroy of the Socialist Party. He was succeeded as President of the Departmental Council by socialist Jean-Louis Tourenne.

Marie-Joseph Bissonnier died on 27 June 2023, at the age of 82.

== Distinctions ==
- Knight of the Legion of Honour (2004)
- Knight of the Order of Agricultural Merit
