= List of senators of Ille-et-Vilaine =

Location of Ille-et-Vilaine in France

Following is a list of senators of Ille-et-Vilaine, people who have represented the department of Ille-et-Vilaine in the Senate of France.

== Third Republic ==
Senators for Ille-et-Vilaine under the French Third Republic were:

- Robert Bellanger (1933–1941)
- Eugène Brager de La Ville-Moysan (1904–1933)
- Alphonse de Callac (1888–1893)
- Paul Garnier (1920–1933)
- Georges Garreau (1897–1906)
- Alphonse Gasnier-Duparc (1932–1941)
- Louis Grivart (1876–1901)
- Henri Guérin (1897–1904)
- Léon Jenouvrier (1907–1932)
- Pierre Jouin (1879–1885)
- Henri de Kergariou (1876–1878)
- Ferdinand Baston de La Riboisière (1906–1919)
- Edgar Le Bastard (1879–1888)
- Alexandre Lefas (1933–1941)
- René Le Hérissé (1913–1920)
- Jean Lemaistre (1933–1941)
- Louis Lemarié (1907–1932)
- Charles Loysel (1876–1879)
- Eugène Pinault (1901–1913)
- André Porteu de la Morandière (1920–1932)
- Théophile Roger-Marvaise (1879–1888)
- Adolphe de Saint-Germain (1901–1907)
- Charles Stourm (1932–1940)
- Auguste Véron (1885–1897)
- Pierre-Marie Frain de La Villegontier (1888–1897)

== Fourth Republic ==
Senators for Ille-et-Vilaine under the French Fourth Republic were:

In office	Name	Party
1946–1948	Hippolyte Réhault	Popular Republican Movement (MRP)
1946–1948	Victor Janton	Popular Republican Movement (MRP)
1946–1948	Eugène Quessot	French Section of the Workers' International (SFIO)
1948–1955	Yves Estève	Union for the New Republic (UNR)
1948–1955	Paul Robert	Républicains indépendants (RI)
1948–1955	Marcel Rupied	Rally of the French People (RPF)
1955–1959	Yves Estève	Union for the New Republic (UNR)
1955–1959	Paul Robert	Républicains indépendants (RI)
1955–1959	Marcel Rupied	Rally of the French People (RPF)

== Fifth Republic ==
Senators for Ille-et-Vilaine under the French Fifth Republic:

In office	Name	Party or group	Notes
1959–1962	Roger du Halgouët	Union for the New Republic (UNR)	
1959–1962	Jean Noury	Centrist Union of Democrats for Progress (UCDP)	
1959–1962	Yves Estève	Union for the New Republic (UNR)	
1962–1971	Roger du Halgouët	Union for the New Republic (UNR)	
1962–1971	Jean Noury	Centrist Union of Democrats for Progress (UCDP)	
1962–1971	Yves Estève	Union for the New Republic (UNR)	
1971–1980	Louis de La Forest	Independent Republicans (RI)	
1971–1980	Henri Fréville	Centrist Union of Democrats for Progress (UCDP)	
1971–1980	Yves Estève	Rally for the Republic (RPR)	
1980–1989	Louis de La Forest	Independent Republicans (RI)	
1980–1989	Jean Madelain	Centrist Union group (UC)	
1980–1989	Marcel Daunay	Centrist Union group (UC)	
1980–1989	Yvon Bourges	Rally for the Republic (RPR)	
1989–1998	Jean Madelain	Centrist Union group (UC)	
1989–1998	André Egu	Centrist Union group (UC)	
1989–1998	Marcel Daunay	Centrist Union group (UC)	
1989–1998	Yvon Bourges	Rally for the Republic (RPR)	
1998–2008	Michel Esneu	Union for a Popular Movement (UMP)	
1998–2008	Yves Fréville	Union for a Popular Movement (UMP) (allied)	
1998–2008	Philippe Nogrix (fr)	Centrist Union group (UC)	
1998–2008	Patrick Lassourd	Union for a Popular Movement (UMP)	Died 28 August 2003
1998–2008	Yannick Texier	Union for a Popular Movement (UMP)	Replaced Patrick Lassourd on 29 August 2003
2008–2014	Dominique de Legge	Union for a Popular Movement (UMP)	
2008–2014	Edmond Hervé	Socialist and Republican group (SOC)	
2008–2014	Virginie Klès	Socialist and Republican group (SOC)	
2008–2014	Jacky Le Menn	Socialist and Republican group (SOC)	
From 2014	Dominique de Legge	Union for a Popular Movement (UMP)	
From 2014	Françoise Gatel	Centrist Union group (UDI)	
From 2014	Jean-Louis Tourenne	Socialist and Republican group (SOC)	
From 2014	Sylvie Robert	Socialist and Republican group (SOC)	

== Sources ==
- Liste des anciens sénateurs de la IIIème République par circonscription (in French), Sénat de France
- Liste des anciens sénateurs de la IVème République par circonscription (in French), Sénat de France
- Liste des anciens sénateurs de la Vème République par circonscription (in French), Sénat de France
- Liste par département – Ille-et-Vilaine (in French), Sénat de France
