= Albert Bouvet =

French cyclist (1930–2017)

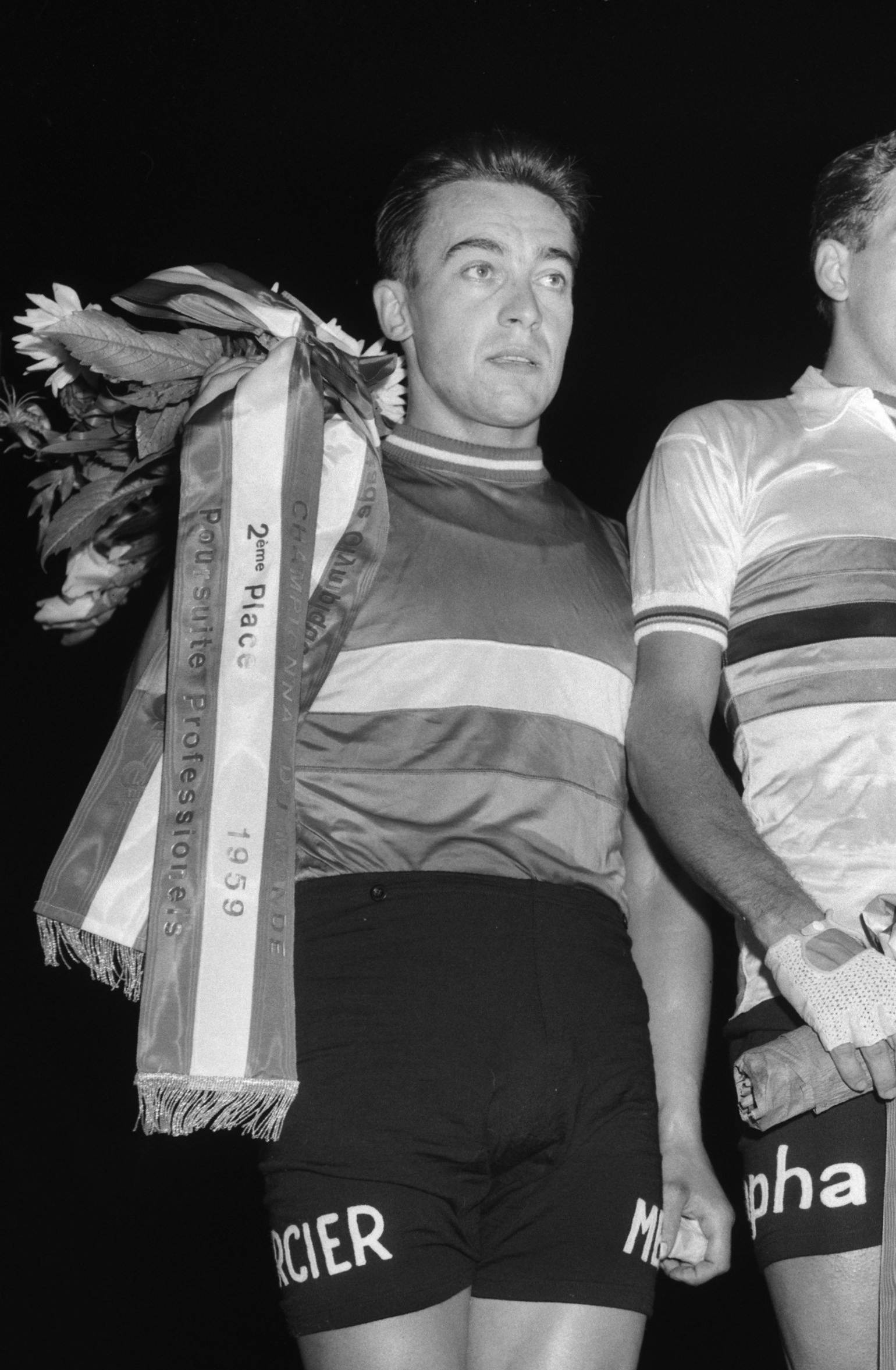
- Bouvet at the 1959 World Championships

Personal information
- Born: 28 February 1930 Mellé, Ille-et-Vilaine, France
- Died: 20 May 2017 (aged 87)

Sport
- Sport: Cycling
Medal record
Representing France
World championships (track, professionals)
Silver medal – second place	1957 Rocourt	Individual pursuit
Silver medal – second place	1959 Amsterdam	Individual pursuit

Albert Bouvet (French: [albɛʁ buvɛ]; 28 February 1930 – 20 May 2017) was a French professional cyclist. He won Paris–Tours in 1956 and remained the last Frenchman to win until Jacky Durand won in 1998. His name is also associated with Paris–Roubaix, as an organiser and discoverer of new sections of pavé.

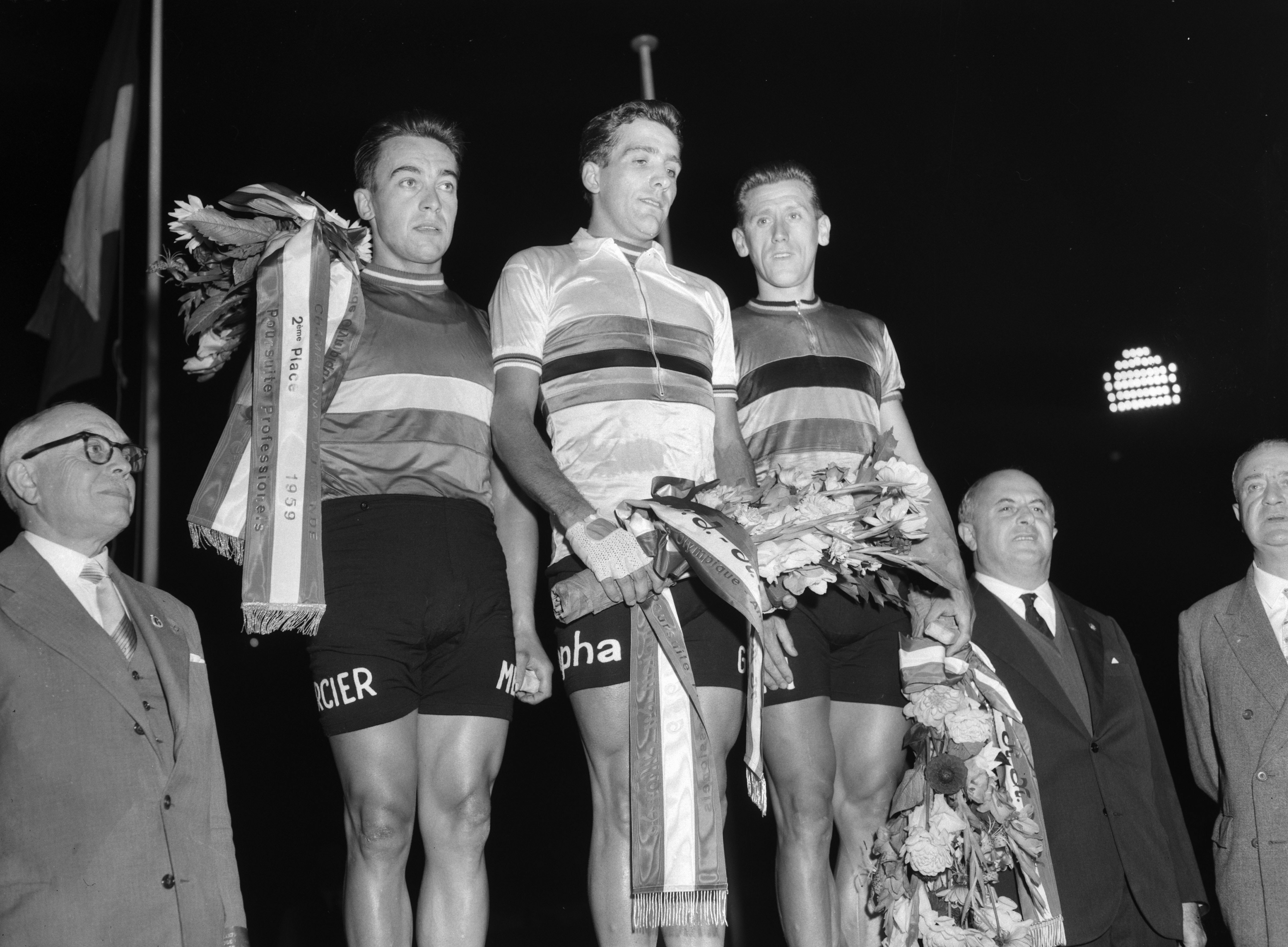
Albert Bouvet with Jean Brankart at the 1959 UCI Track Cycling World Championships

The Albert Bouvet Trophy is a race between Saint Gregory and Saint-Georges-de-Reintembault in Ille et Vilaine.

== Palmarès ==
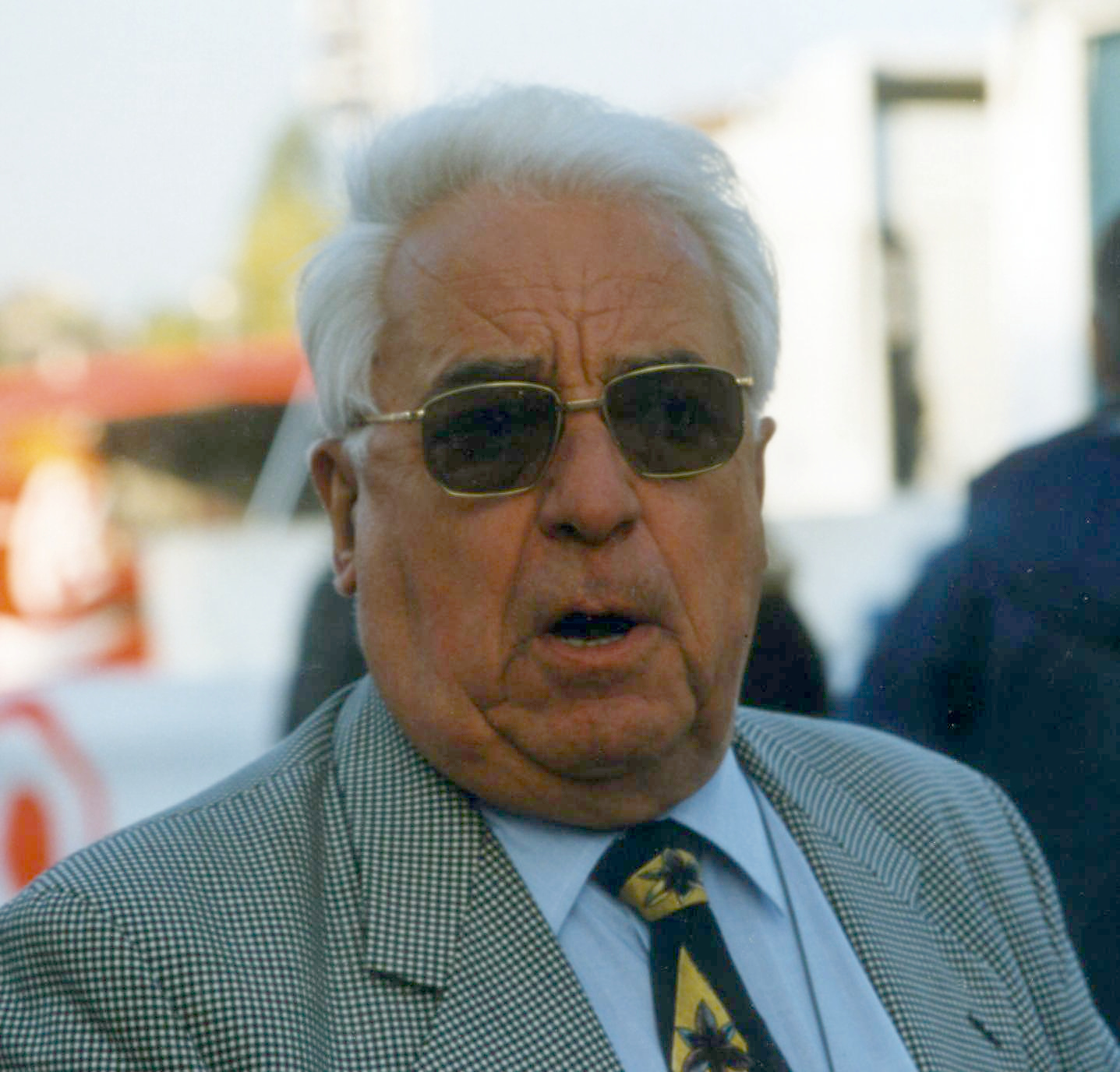
Albert Bouvet at 1997 Paris–Tours

=== Wins ===
- Champion of France, Individual pursuit: 1958, 1959, 1960, 1962, 1963 (2nd: 1961)
- Champion of France, Individual pursuit (for Winter): 1957
- Paris–Tours: 1956
- Circuit Boucles de la Seine: 1955
- Circuit Finistère: 1956
- Boucles du Bas-Limousin: 1955
- Tour de l'Orne: 1954
- Manche-Océan: 1954 (2nd: 1955, 1957 3rd: 1956)
- Grand Prix de France (as an amateur): 1953

=== Other significant results ===
- 2nd Individual pursuit World Championships: 1957, 1959
- 2nd Grand Prix des Nations: 1955, 1956
- 2nd Tour de Champagne: 1955
- 2nd Grand Prix de Suisse (TT): 1955
- 2nd Grand Prix de Cannes: 1960
- 2nd Boucles de l'Aulne: 1957
- 2nd l'Omnium des Nations à Daumesnil: 1958 (with Louison Bobet)
- 3rd Four Days of Dunkirk: 1956
- 3rd Grand Prix de Lugano: 1956
- 3rd Grand Prix de Fourmies: 1959
- 3rd Grand Prix of Algiers: 1959
- 3rd Grand Prix Longines (TT): 1959
- 3rd Grand Prix Parisien (TT): 1962
- 3rd Boucles Roquevairoises: 1960
- 4th Bordeaux–Paris: 1957
