= Cerdon =

Cerdon is the name of several communes in France:

- Cerdon, in the Ain département
- Cerdon, in the Loiret département

It is also a pink sparkling wine from grapes originating in the village of the Ain department.
