= Beauce =

Beauce may refer to:

- Beauce, France, a natural region in north-central France
- Beaucé, a commune in the Ille-et-Vilaine department, Brittany, France
- Beauce, Quebec, a historical and cultural region of Canada
  - Beauce (federal electoral district), a federal electoral district in Quebec
  - Beauce (provincial electoral district), a defunct provincial electoral district now split into Beauce-Nord and Beauce-Sud
  - Beauce (Province of Canada), a defunct pre-Confederation electoral district
