= Fleurigné =

Commune in Ille-et-Vilaine, France

Fleurigné Floereinyaè (Gallo) Flurinieg (Breton)
- Part of La Chapelle-Fleurigné
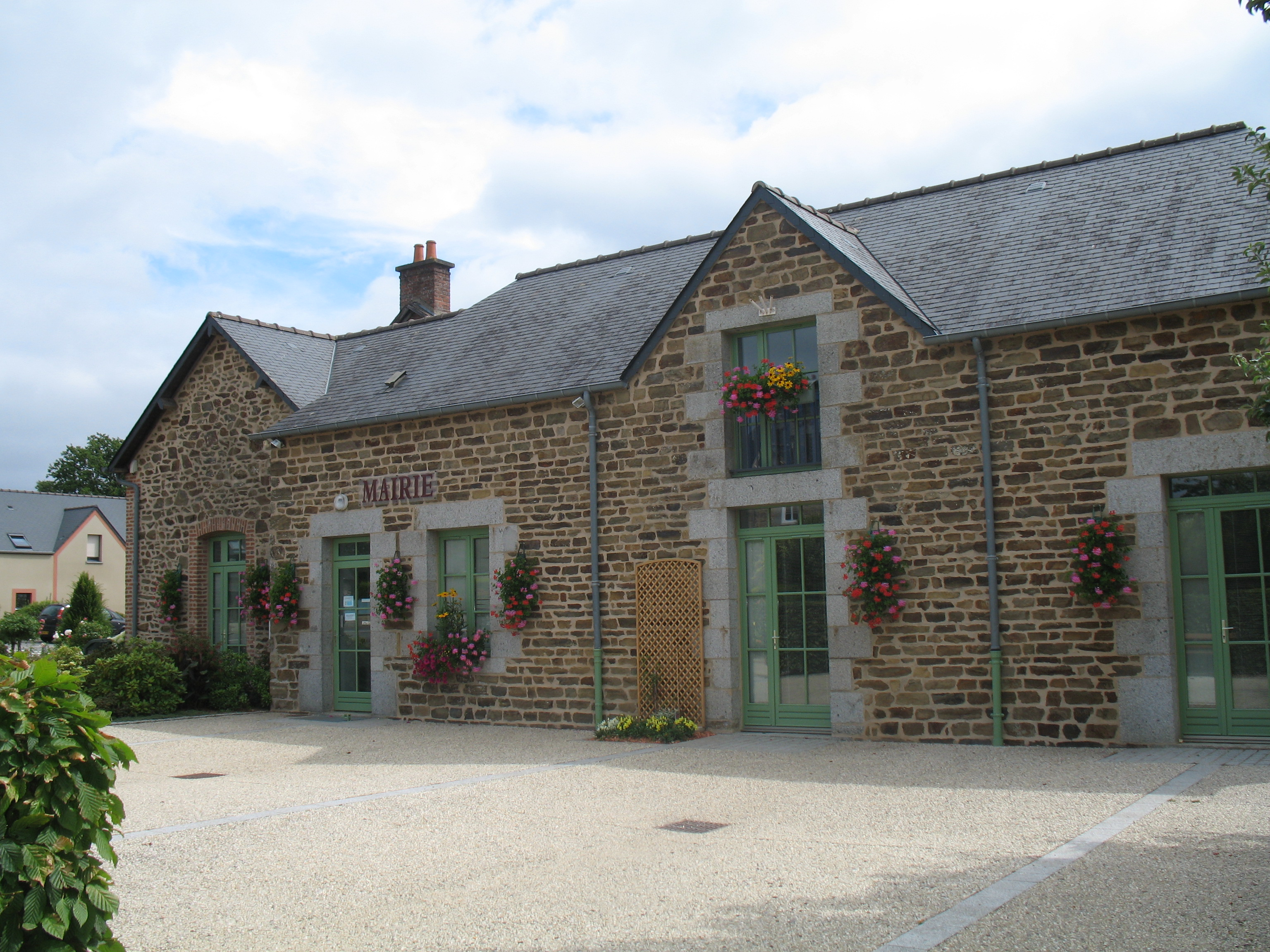
- Town hall
- Location of Fleurigné
- Location within France Location within Brittany
- Coordinates: 48°20′10″N 1°07′11″W
- Country: France
- Region: Brittany
- Department: Ille-et-Vilaine
- Arrondissement: Fougères-Vitré
- Canton: Fougères-2
- Commune: La Chapelle-Fleurigné
- Area^{1}: 18.17 km^{2} (7.02 sq mi)
- Highest elevation: 233 m (764 ft)
- Lowest elevation: 79 m (259 ft)
- Population (2021): 917
  - Density: 50.5/km^{2} (131/sq mi)
- Time zone: UTC+01:00 (CET)
  - Summer (DST): UTC+02:00 (CEST)
- Postal code: 35133
- ^{1} French Land Register data, which excludes lakes, ponds, glaciers > 1 km^{2} (0.386 sq mi or 247 acres) and river estuaries.

Fleurigné (French pronunciation: [flœʁiɲe]; Breton: Flurinieg; Gallo: Floereinyaè) is a former commune in the Ille-et-Vilaine department in Brittany in northwestern France. It was merged with La Chapelle-Janson to form La Chapelle-Fleurigné on 1 January 2024.

== Population ==
Historical population
| Year | Pop. | ±% p.a. |
|---|---|---|
| 1968 | 674 | — |
| 1975 | 676 | +0.04% |
| 1982 | 812 | +2.65% |
| 1990 | 841 | +0.44% |
| 1999 | 896 | +0.71% |
| 2009 | 1,032 | +1.42% |
| 2014 | 1,022 | −0.19% |
| 2020 | 927 | −1.61% |
Source: INSEE

Inhabitants of Fleurigné are called Fleurignéens in French.

== See also ==
- Communes of the Ille-et-Vilaine department
