= Jean Madelain =

French politician (1924–2023)

Member of the French Senate for Ille-et-Vilaine
- In office 28 September 1980 – 30 September 1998

Member of the General Council of Ille-et-Vilaine
- In office 1964–1988
- Preceded by: Pierre-Henri Teitgen
- Succeeded by: Marie-Thérèse Boisseau
- Constituency: Canton of Fougères-Nord

Mayor of Fougères
- In office 1965–1971
- Preceded by: Hippolyte Réhault
- Succeeded by: Michel Cointat

Personal details
- Born: 9 January 1924
- Died: 17 May 2023 (aged 99)
- Party: CDS

Jean Madelain (9 January 1924 – 17 May 2023) was a French politician of the Centre of Social Democrats (CDS).

== Biography ==
Born on 9 January 1924, Madelain began his career as Director of the Cristallerie de Fougères. He was elected to the Senate in 1980 to represent Ille-et-Vilaine. He was re-elected to a second term in 1989. In the Senate, he notably served on the Committee of Social Affairs.

Madelain served as Mayor of Fougères from 1965 to 1971. He also represented the Canton of Fougères-Nord in the General Council of Ille-et-Vilaine from 1964 to 1988. He was succeeded in this position by Marie-Thérèse Boisseau.

Jean Madelain died on 17 May 2023, at the age of 99.
