= La Chapelle-Janson =

La Chapelle-Janson Chapel-Yent
- Part of La Chapelle-Fleurigné
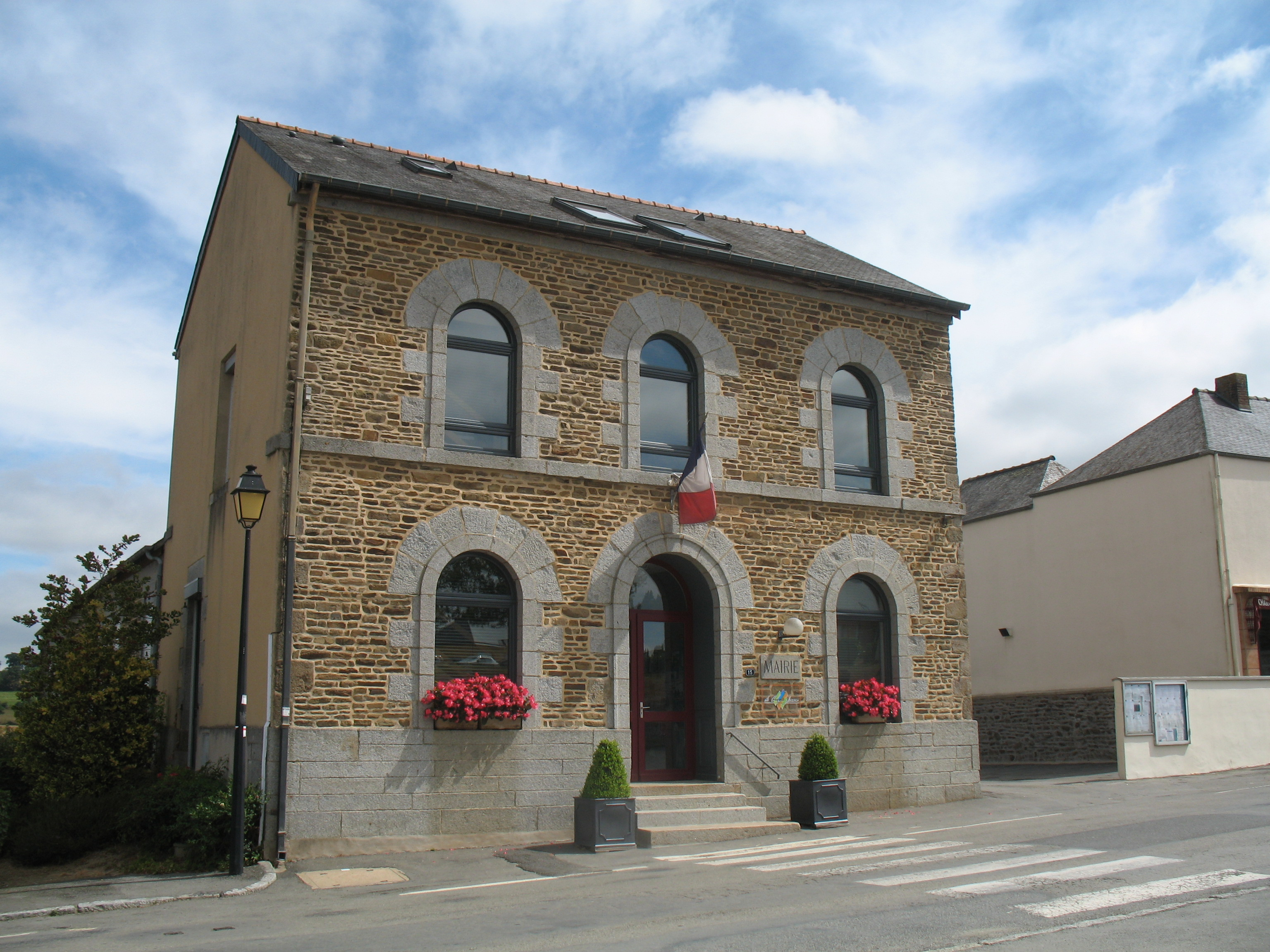
- Town hall
- Location of La Chapelle-Janson
- Location within France Location within Brittany
- Coordinates: 48°20′54″N 1°06′03″W
- Country: France
- Region: Brittany
- Department: Ille-et-Vilaine
- Arrondissement: Fougères-Vitré
- Canton: Fougères-2
- Commune: La Chapelle-Fleurigné
- Area^{1}: 26.96 km^{2} (10.41 sq mi)
- Highest elevation: 249 m (817 ft)
- Lowest elevation: 79 m (259 ft)
- Population (2021): 1,492
  - Density: 55.34/km^{2} (143.3/sq mi)
- Time zone: UTC+01:00 (CET)
  - Summer (DST): UTC+02:00 (CEST)
- Postal code: 35133
- ^{1} French Land Register data, which excludes lakes, ponds, glaciers > 1 km^{2} (0.386 sq mi or 247 acres) and river estuaries.

La Chapelle-Janson (French pronunciation: [la ʃapɛl ʒɑ̃sɔ̃]; Breton: Chapel-Yent; Gallo: La Chapèll-Janczon) is a former commune in the Ille-et-Vilaine department of Brittany in north-western France. It was merged with Fleurigné to form La Chapelle-Fleurigné on 1 January 2024.

== Population ==
Historical population
Year	Pop.	±% p.a.
1968	1,108	—
1975	1,041	−0.89%
1982	1,140	+1.31%
1990	1,244	+1.10%
1999	1,156	−0.81%
2009	1,309	+1.25%
2014	1,426	+1.73%
2020	1,483	+0.66%
Source: INSEE

Inhabitants of La Chapelle-Janson are called Jansonnais in French.

== See also ==
- Communes of the Ille-et-Vilaine department
