= Luitré-Dompierre =

Luitré-Dompierre Loezherieg-Dompêr (Breton)
- Commune
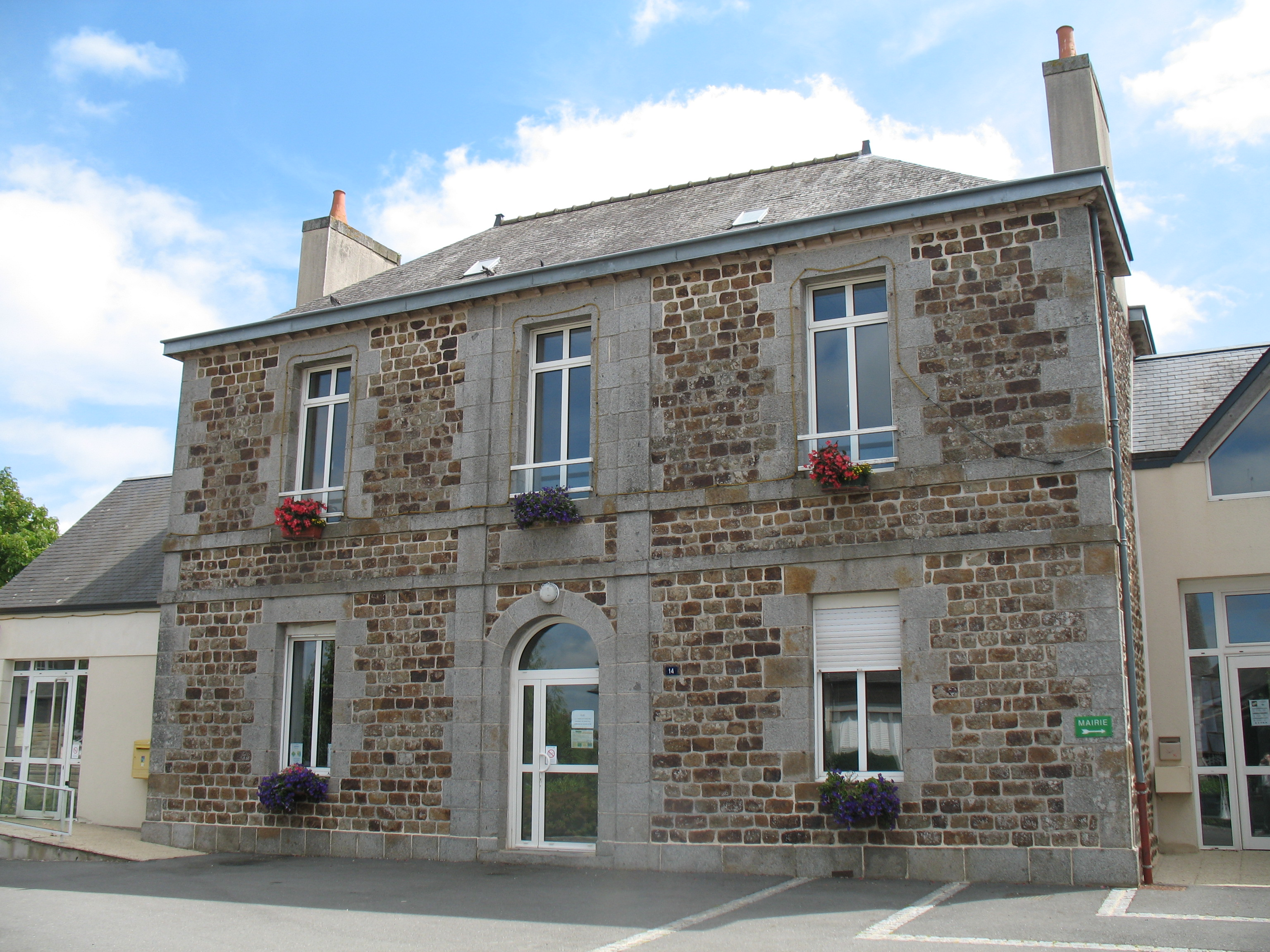
- The town hall of Luitré
- Location of Luitré-Dompierre
- Location within France Location within Brittany
- Coordinates: 48°17′03″N 1°07′02″W
- Country: France
- Region: Brittany
- Department: Ille-et-Vilaine
- Arrondissement: Fougères-Vitré
- Canton: Fougères-2
- Intercommunality: Fougères Agglomération

Government
  - Mayor (2020–2026): Michel Balluais
- Area^{1}: 38.83 km^{2} (14.99 sq mi)
- Highest elevation: 201 m (659 ft)
- Lowest elevation: 78 m (256 ft)
- Population (2023): 1,868
  - Density: 48.11/km^{2} (124.6/sq mi)
- Time zone: UTC+01:00 (CET)
  - Summer (DST): UTC+02:00 (CEST)
- INSEE/Postal code: 35163 /35133
- ^{1} French Land Register data, which excludes lakes, ponds, glaciers > 1 km^{2} (0.386 sq mi or 247 acres) and river estuaries.

Luitré-Dompierre (French pronunciation: [lɥitʁe dɔ̃pjɛʁ]; Breton: Loezherieg-Dompêr) is a commune in the Ille-et-Vilaine department in Brittany in northwestern France. It was established on 1 January 2019 by merger of the former communes of Luitré (the seat) and Dompierre-du-Chemin.

== See also ==
- Communes of the Ille-et-Vilaine department
