= Dompierre-du-Chemin =

Dompierre-du-Chemin Dompêr-an-Hent
- Part of Luitré-Dompierre
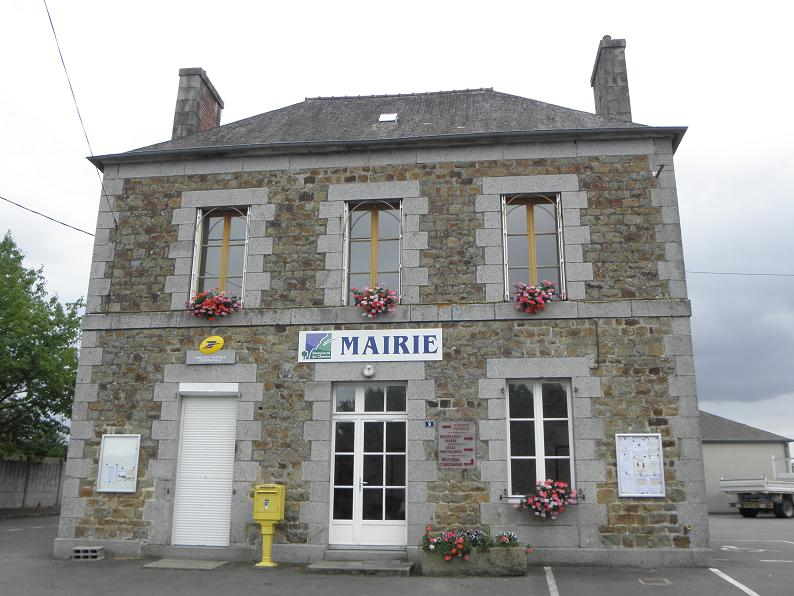
- Town hall
- Location of Dompierre-du-Chemin
- Location within France Location within Brittany
- Coordinates: 48°16′04″N 1°08′33″W
- Country: France
- Region: Brittany
- Department: Ille-et-Vilaine
- Arrondissement: Fougères-Vitré
- Canton: Fougères-1
- Commune: Luitré-Dompierre
- Area^{1}: 9.68 km^{2} (3.74 sq mi)
- Highest elevation: 182 m (597 ft)
- Lowest elevation: 93 m (305 ft)
- Population (2023): 563
  - Density: 58.2/km^{2} (151/sq mi)
- Time zone: UTC+01:00 (CET)
  - Summer (DST): UTC+02:00 (CEST)
- Postal code: 35210
- ^{1} French Land Register data, which excludes lakes, ponds, glaciers > 1 km^{2} (0.386 sq mi or 247 acres) and river estuaries.

Dompierre-du-Chemin (French pronunciation: [dɔ̃pjɛʁ dy ʃəmɛ̃]; Breton: Dompêr-an-Hent; Gallo: Donpièrr) is a former commune in the Ille-et-Vilaine department in Brittany in northwestern France. On 1 January 2019, it was merged into the new commune Luitré-Dompierre. Inhabitants of Dompierre-du-Chemin are called Dompierrais in French.

== See also ==
- Communes of the Ille-et-Vilaine department
