= Fougères Agglomération =

- Communauté d'agglomération
- Interactive map of Fougères Agglomération
- Coordinates: 48°21′N 01°10′W
- Country: France
- Region: Brittany
- Department: Ille-et-Vilaine
- No. of communes: {{{nbcomm}}}
- Established: 2017
- Area: 538.7 km^{2} (208.0 sq mi)
- Population (2019): 55,874
  - Density: 103.7/km^{2} (268.6/sq mi)
- Website: fougeres-agglo.bzh

Fougères Agglomération is the communauté d'agglomération, an intercommunal structure, centred on the town of Fougères. It is located in the Ille-et-Vilaine department, in the Brittany region, northwestern France. Created in 2017, its seat is in La Selle-en-Luitré. Its area is 538.7 km^{2}. Its population was 55,874 in 2019, of which 20,595 in Fougères proper.

== Composition ==
The communauté d'agglomération consists of the following 28 communes:

1. La Bazouge-du-Désert
2. Beaucé
3. Billé
4. La Chapelle-Fleurigné
5. La Chapelle-Saint-Aubert
6. Combourtillé
7. Le Ferré
8. Fougères
9. Javené
10. Laignelet
11. Landéan
12. Lécousse
13. Le Loroux
14. Louvigné-du-Désert
15. Luitré-Dompierre
16. Mellé
17. Monthault
18. Parcé
19. Parigné
20. Poilley
21. Rives-du-Couesnon
22. Romagné
23. Saint-Christophe-de-Valains
24. Saint-Georges-de-Reintembault
25. Saint-Ouen-des-Alleux
26. Saint-Sauveur-des-Landes
27. La Selle-en-Luitré
28. Villamée
