= Villamée =

Villamée Vilaemaé (Gallo) Gwilavez (Breton)
- Commune
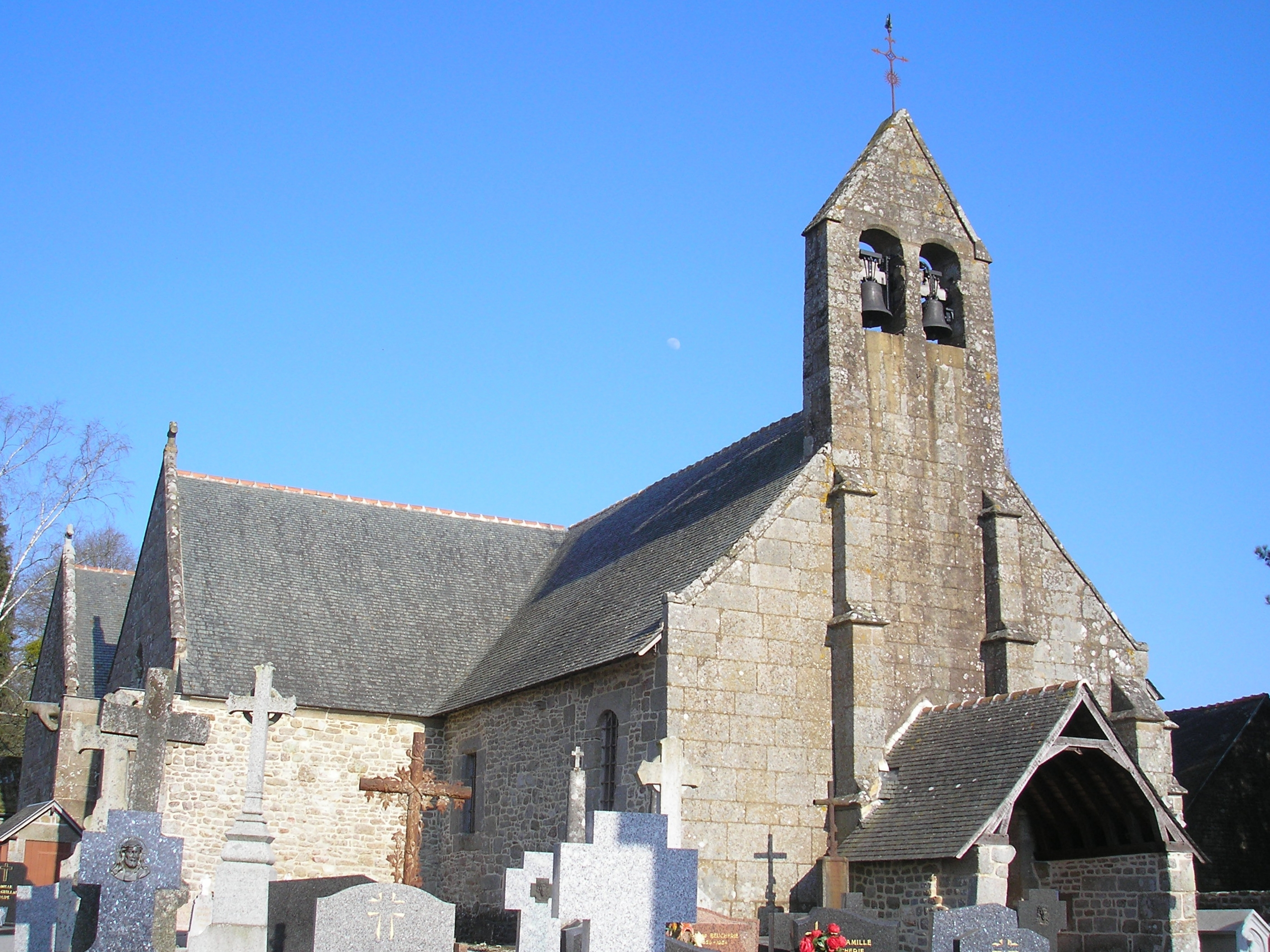
- The church in Villamée

- Coat of arms
- Location of Villamée
- Location within France Location within Brittany
- Coordinates: 48°27′42″N 1°13′14″W
- Country: France
- Region: Brittany
- Department: Ille-et-Vilaine
- Arrondissement: Fougères-Vitré
- Canton: Fougères-2
- Intercommunality: Fougères Agglomération

Government
  - Mayor (2020–2026): Laurence Cherel
- Area^{1}: 10.66 km^{2} (4.12 sq mi)
- Highest elevation: 171 m (561 ft)
- Lowest elevation: 134 m (440 ft)
- Population (2023): 301
  - Density: 28.2/km^{2} (73.1/sq mi)
- Time zone: UTC+01:00 (CET)
  - Summer (DST): UTC+02:00 (CEST)
- INSEE/Postal code: 35357 /35420
- ^{1} French Land Register data, which excludes lakes, ponds, glaciers > 1 km^{2} (0.386 sq mi or 247 acres) and river estuaries.

Villamée (French pronunciation: [vilame]; Breton: Gwilavez; Gallo: Vilaemaé) is a commune in the Ille-et-Vilaine department of Brittany in northwestern France.

== Population ==
Inhabitants of Villamée are called Villaméens in French.

Historical population
Year	Pop.	±% p.a.
1968	470	—
1975	417	−1.69%
1982	377	−1.43%
1990	334	−1.50%
1999	314	−0.68%
2007	320	+0.24%
2012	329	+0.56%
2017	313	−0.99%
2023	301	−0.65%
Source: INSEE

== See also ==
- Communes of the Ille-et-Vilaine department
