= Parigné =

Parigné Paraenyaè/Parinyaè (Gallo) Parinieg (Breton)
- Commune
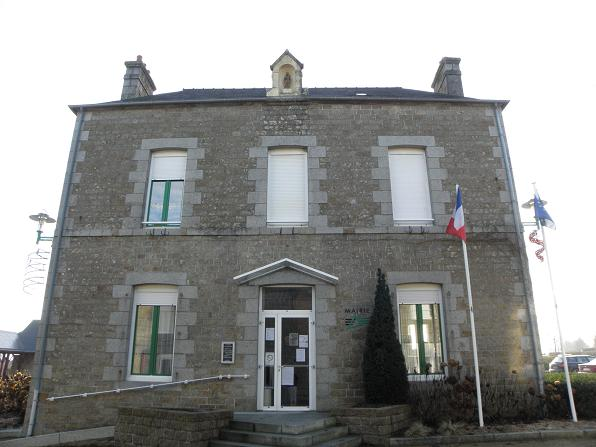
- The town hall of Parigné

- Coat of arms
- Location of Parigné
- Location within France Location within Brittany
- Coordinates: 48°25′43″N 1°11′25″W
- Country: France
- Region: Brittany
- Department: Ille-et-Vilaine
- Arrondissement: Fougères-Vitré
- Canton: Fougères-2
- Intercommunality: Fougères Agglomération

Government
  - Mayor (2020–2026): Hervé Guillard
- Area^{1}: 20.72 km^{2} (8.00 sq mi)
- Highest elevation: 182 m (597 ft)
- Lowest elevation: 109 m (358 ft)
- Population (2023): 1,286
  - Density: 62.07/km^{2} (160.7/sq mi)
- Time zone: UTC+01:00 (CET)
  - Summer (DST): UTC+02:00 (CEST)
- INSEE/Postal code: 35215 /35133
- ^{1} French Land Register data, which excludes lakes, ponds, glaciers > 1 km^{2} (0.386 sq mi or 247 acres) and river estuaries.

Parigné (French pronunciation: [paʁiɲe]; Breton: Parinieg; Gallo: Paraenyaè, Parinyaè) is a commune in the Ille-et-Vilaine department of Brittany in northwestern France.

== Population ==
Inhabitants of Parigné are called in French parignéens.

Historical population
Year	Pop.	±% p.a.
1968	965	—
1975	911	−0.82%
1982	1,046	+1.99%
1990	1,068	+0.26%
1999	1,133	+0.66%
2007	1,274	+1.48%
2012	1,299	+0.39%
2017	1,336	+0.56%
2023	1,286	−0.63%
Source: INSEE

== See also ==
- Communes of the Ille-et-Vilaine department
