= Jean-Louis Tourenne =

French politician

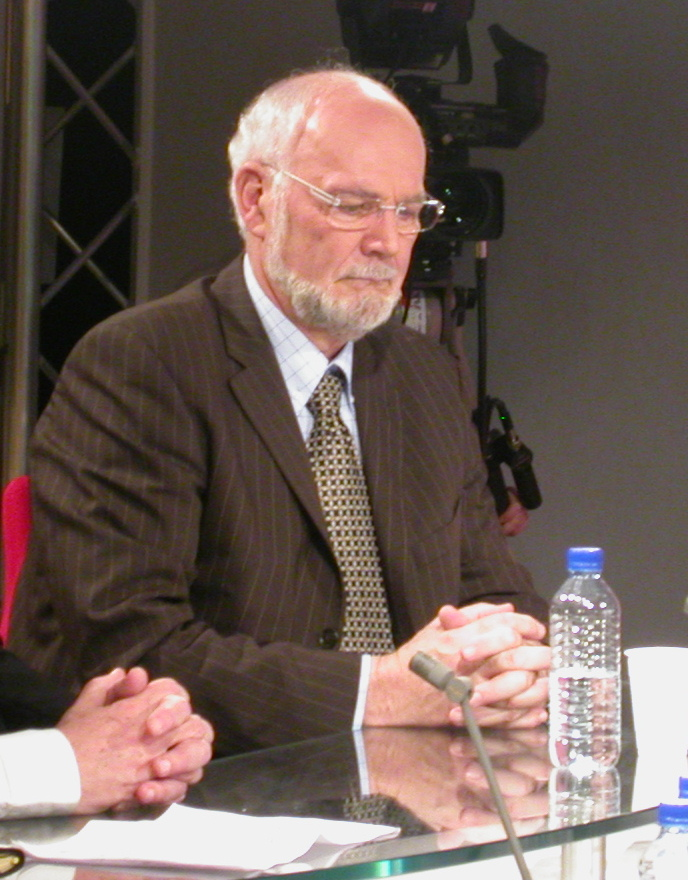

Member of the French Senate for Ille-et-Vilaine
- Incumbent
- Assumed office 1 October 2014

President of the general council of Ille-et-Vilaine
- In office 2004–2015
- Preceded by: Marie-Joseph Bissonnier
- Succeeded by: Jean-Luc Chenut

Personal details
- Born: 25 August 1944 (age 81) La Mézière, France
- Party: Socialist Party
- Profession: Teacher

Jean-Louis Tourenne (born 1944 in La Mézière) is a French politician and the former President of the general council of Ille-et-Vilaine. He is a member of the Socialist Party.

He became the first PS President of the general council of Ille-et-Vilaine since 1848 following the 2004 French cantonal elections, when the left gained the department from the right. He was reelected in 2011.
