= Landéan =

Landéan Lanyen (Gallo) Landean (Breton)
- Commune
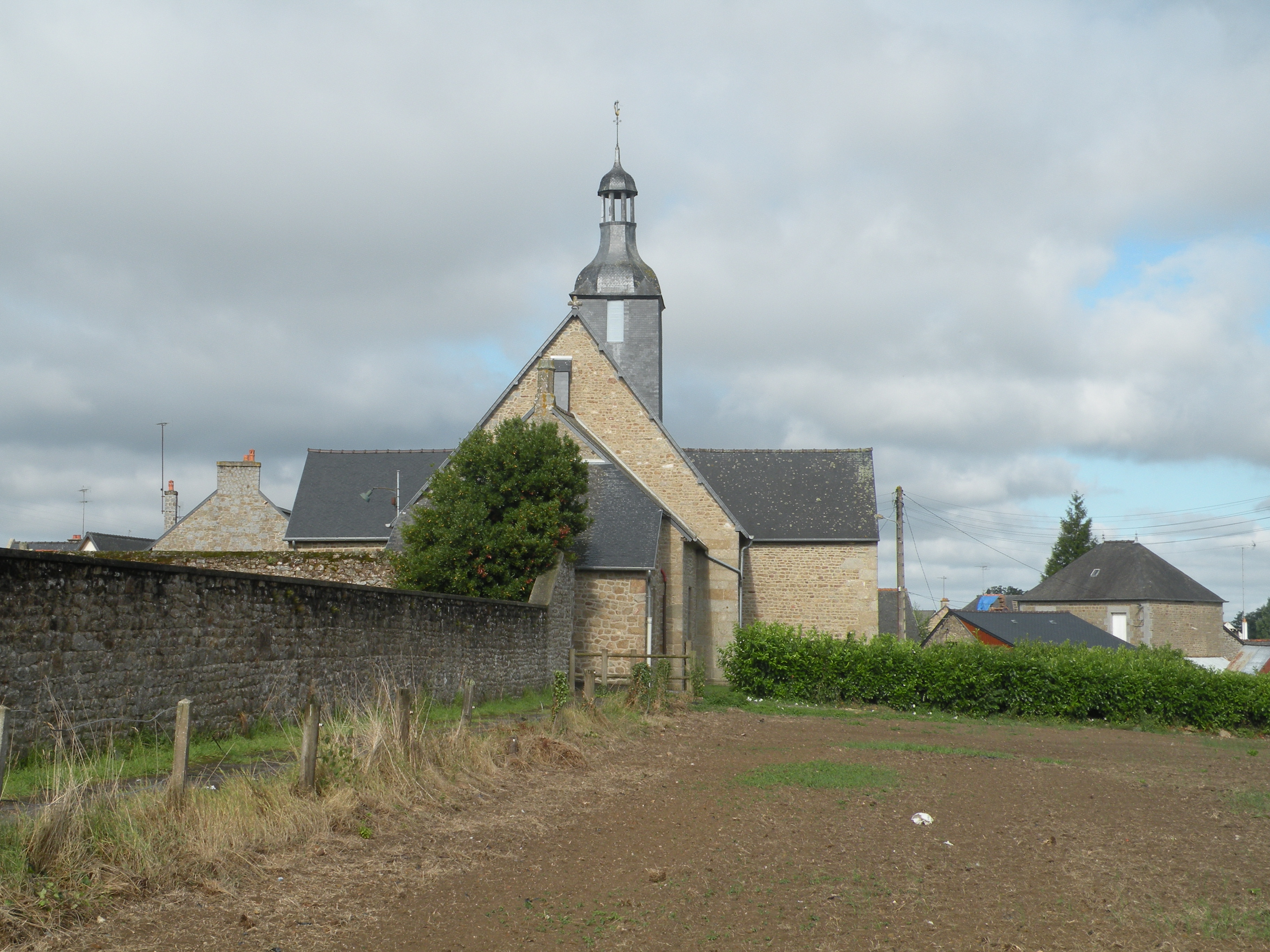
- The church of Saint-Pierre
- Location of Landéan
- Location within France Location within Brittany
- Coordinates: 48°24′50″N 1°09′05″W
- Country: France
- Region: Brittany
- Department: Ille-et-Vilaine
- Arrondissement: Fougères-Vitré
- Canton: Fougères-2
- Intercommunality: Fougères Agglomération

Government
  - Mayor (2020–2026): Franck Esnault
- Area^{1}: 27.31 km^{2} (10.54 sq mi)
- Highest elevation: 208 m (682 ft)
- Lowest elevation: 107 m (351 ft)
- Population (2023): 1,250
  - Density: 45.8/km^{2} (119/sq mi)
- Time zone: UTC+01:00 (CET)
  - Summer (DST): UTC+02:00 (CEST)
- INSEE/Postal code: 35142 /35133
- ^{1} French Land Register data, which excludes lakes, ponds, glaciers > 1 km^{2} (0.386 sq mi or 247 acres) and river estuaries.

Landéan (French pronunciation: [lɑ̃deɑ̃]; Gallo: Lanyen, Breton: Landean) is a commune in the Ille-et-Vilaine department of Brittany in northwestern France.

== Population ==
Inhabitants of Landéan are called in French landéanais .

Historical population
| Year | Pop. | ±% p.a. |
|---|---|---|
| 1968 | 917 | — |
| 1975 | 920 | +0.05% |
| 1982 | 1,129 | +2.97% |
| 1990 | 1,199 | +0.75% |
| 1999 | 1,166 | −0.31% |
| 2007 | 1,257 | +0.94% |
| 2012 | 1,263 | +0.10% |
| 2017 | 1,205 | −0.94% |
| 2023 | 1,250 | +0.61% |
Source: INSEE

== See also ==
- Communes of the Ille-et-Vilaine department
