= Le Ferré =

Le Ferré Ferred (Breton)
- Commune
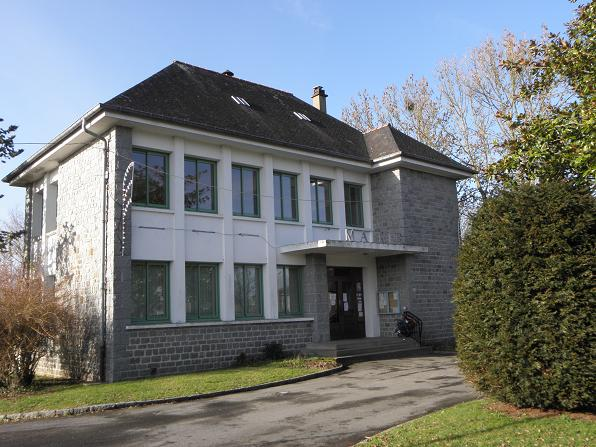
- Town hall
- Location of Le Ferré
- Location within France Location within Brittany
- Coordinates: 48°29′36″N 1°17′34″W
- Country: France
- Region: Brittany
- Department: Ille-et-Vilaine
- Arrondissement: Fougères-Vitré
- Canton: Fougères-2
- Intercommunality: Fougères Agglomération

Government
  - Mayor (2020–2026): Louis Pautrel
- Area^{1}: 16.92 km^{2} (6.53 sq mi)
- Highest elevation: 172 m (564 ft)
- Lowest elevation: 90 m (300 ft)
- Population (2023): 732
  - Density: 43.3/km^{2} (112/sq mi)
- Time zone: UTC+01:00 (CET)
  - Summer (DST): UTC+02:00 (CEST)
- INSEE/Postal code: 35111 /35420
- ^{1} French Land Register data, which excludes lakes, ponds, glaciers > 1 km^{2} (0.386 sq mi or 247 acres) and river estuaries.

Le Ferré (French pronunciation: [lə fɛʁe]; Breton: Ferred) is a commune in the Ille-et-Vilaine department in Brittany in northwestern France.

== Population ==
Inhabitants of Le Ferré are called Ferréens in French.

Historical population
| Year | Pop. | ±% p.a. |
|---|---|---|
| 1968 | 788 | — |
| 1975 | 733 | −1.03% |
| 1982 | 663 | −1.42% |
| 1990 | 619 | −0.85% |
| 1999 | 585 | −0.63% |
| 2007 | 588 | +0.06% |
| 2012 | 717 | +4.05% |
| 2017 | 687 | −0.85% |
| 2023 | 732 | +1.06% |
Source: INSEE

== See also ==
- Communes of the Ille-et-Vilaine department
