= Luitré =

Commune in Ille-et-Vilaine, France

Luitré Loezherieg
- Part of Luitré-Dompierre
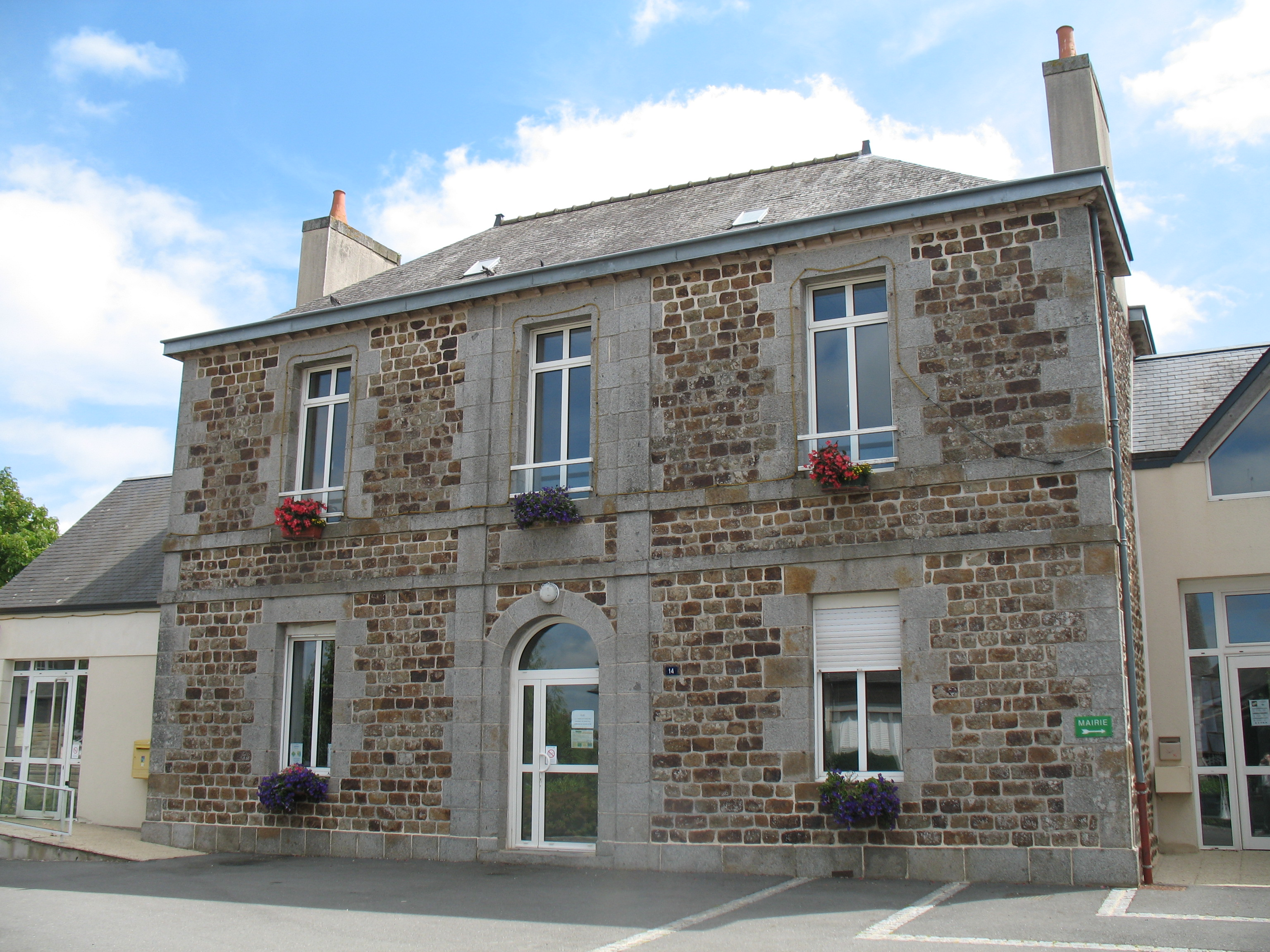
- The town hall of Luitré
- Location of Luitré
- Location within France Location within Brittany
- Coordinates: 48°17′03″N 1°07′02″W
- Country: France
- Region: Brittany
- Department: Ille-et-Vilaine
- Arrondissement: Fougères-Vitré
- Canton: Fougères-2
- Commune: Luitré-Dompierre
- Area^{1}: 29.15 km^{2} (11.25 sq mi)
- Highest elevation: 201 m (659 ft)
- Lowest elevation: 78 m (256 ft)
- Population (2022): 1,289
  - Density: 44.22/km^{2} (114.5/sq mi)
- Time zone: UTC+01:00 (CET)
  - Summer (DST): UTC+02:00 (CEST)
- Postal code: 35133
- ^{1} French Land Register data, which excludes lakes, ponds, glaciers > 1 km^{2} (0.386 sq mi or 247 acres) and river estuaries.

Luitré (French pronunciation: [lɥitʁe]; Breton: Loezherieg; Gallo: Lutraé) is a former commune in the Ille-et-Vilaine department in Brittany in northwestern France. On 1 January 2019, it was merged into the new commune Luitré-Dompierre.

Amenities: Pharmacy, Doctor, Mairie, small Post Office, carwash, Automat laundry, Technique Controle - repair garage, boulangerie, charcuterie, bar, public toilets, fishing lake

== Population ==
Inhabitants of Luitré are called Luitréens in French.

Historical population
Year	Pop.	±% p.a.
1962	1,191	—
1968	1,154	−0.52%
1975	1,010	−1.89%
1982	1,160	+2.00%
1990	1,258	+1.02%
1999	1,186	−0.65%
2006	1,277	+1.06%
2022	1,289	+0.06%
Source: EHESS and INSEE

== See also ==
- Communes of the Ille-et-Vilaine department
