= Poilley, Ille-et-Vilaine =

Poilley Polhaé (Gallo) Polieg (Breton)
- Commune
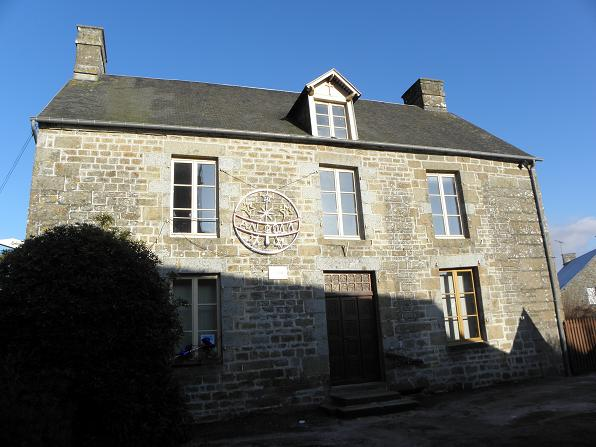
- The town hall in Poilley

- Coat of arms
- Location of Poilley
- Location within France Location within Brittany
- Coordinates: 48°27′57″N 1°15′40″W
- Country: France
- Region: Brittany
- Department: Ille-et-Vilaine
- Arrondissement: Fougères-Vitré
- Canton: Fougères-2
- Intercommunality: Fougères Agglomération

Government
  - Mayor (2020–2026): Noël Demazel
- Area^{1}: 10.78 km^{2} (4.16 sq mi)
- Highest elevation: 184 m (604 ft)
- Lowest elevation: 115 m (377 ft)
- Population (2023): 394
  - Density: 36.5/km^{2} (94.7/sq mi)
- Time zone: UTC+01:00 (CET)
  - Summer (DST): UTC+02:00 (CEST)
- INSEE/Postal code: 35230 /35420
- ^{1} French Land Register data, which excludes lakes, ponds, glaciers > 1 km^{2} (0.386 sq mi or 247 acres) and river estuaries.

Poilley (French pronunciation: [pɔjɛ]; Gallo: Polhaé, Breton: Polieg) is a commune in the Ille-et-Vilaine department of Brittany in northwestern France.

== Population ==
Historical population
Year	Pop.	±% p.a.
1968	572	—
1975	554	−0.46%
1982	468	−2.38%
1990	419	−1.37%
1999	384	−0.96%
2007	404	+0.64%
2012	389	−0.75%
2017	378	−0.57%
2023	394	+0.69%
Source: INSEE

== See also ==
- Communes of the Ille-et-Vilaine department
