= Monthault =

Monthault Montaut (Gallo) Brennaod (Breton)
- Commune
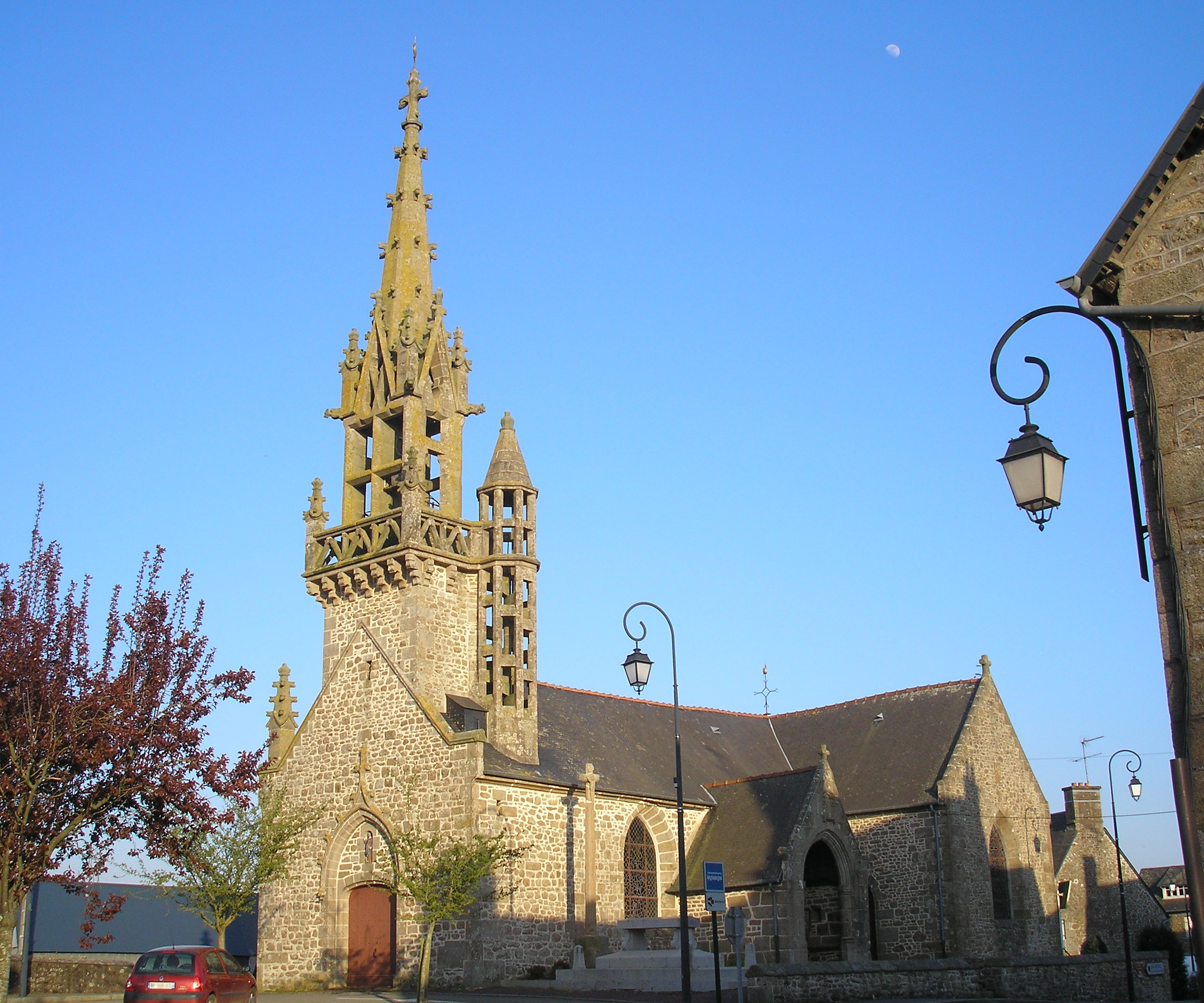
- The church of Saint-Pierre
- Location of Monthault
- Location within France Location within Brittany
- Coordinates: 48°30′43″N 1°10′48″W
- Country: France
- Region: Brittany
- Department: Ille-et-Vilaine
- Arrondissement: Fougères-Vitré
- Canton: Fougères-2
- Intercommunality: Fougères Agglomération

Government
  - Mayor (2020–2026): Roger Buffet
- Area^{1}: 8.20 km^{2} (3.17 sq mi)
- Highest elevation: 197 m (646 ft)
- Lowest elevation: 114 m (374 ft)
- Population (2023): 248
  - Density: 30.2/km^{2} (78.3/sq mi)
- Time zone: UTC+01:00 (CET)
  - Summer (DST): UTC+02:00 (CEST)
- INSEE/Postal code: 35190 /35420
- ^{1} French Land Register data, which excludes lakes, ponds, glaciers > 1 km^{2} (0.386 sq mi or 247 acres) and river estuaries.

Monthault (French pronunciation: [mɔ̃to]; Breton: Brennaod; Gallo: Montaut) is a commune in the Ille-et-Vilaine department in Brittany in northwestern France.

== Population ==
Inhabitants of Monthault are called Monthaltais in French.

Historical population
| Year | Pop. | ±% p.a. |
|---|---|---|
| 1968 | 452 | — |
| 1975 | 387 | −2.19% |
| 1982 | 338 | −1.92% |
| 1990 | 293 | −1.77% |
| 1999 | 249 | −1.79% |
| 2007 | 250 | +0.05% |
| 2012 | 257 | +0.55% |
| 2017 | 265 | +0.61% |
| 2023 | 248 | −1.10% |
Source: INSEE

== Notable people ==
Eustace de Montaut, Anglo-Norman baron in England

== See also ==
- Communes of the Ille-et-Vilaine department
