= La Bazouge-du-Désert =

La Bazouge-du-Désert La Bazój-du-Dezèrt (Gallo) Bazeleg-an-Dezerzh (Breton)
- Commune
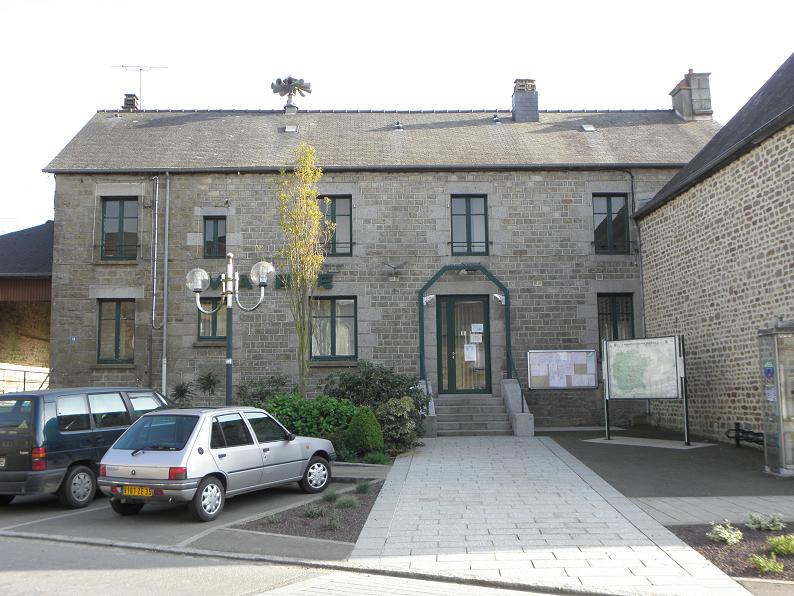
- Town hall

- Coat of arms
- Location of La Bazouge-du-Désert
- Location within France Location within Brittany
- Coordinates: 48°26′38″N 1°06′13″W
- Country: France
- Region: Brittany
- Department: Ille-et-Vilaine
- Arrondissement: Fougères-Vitré
- Canton: Fougères-2
- Intercommunality: Fougères Agglomération

Government
  - Mayor (2020–2026): Joseph Boivent
- Area^{1}: 24.60 km^{2} (9.50 sq mi)
- Highest elevation: 193 m (633 ft)
- Lowest elevation: 113 m (371 ft)
- Population (2023): 1,095
  - Density: 44.51/km^{2} (115.3/sq mi)
- Time zone: UTC+01:00 (CET)
  - Summer (DST): UTC+02:00 (CEST)
- INSEE/Postal code: 35018 /35420
- ^{1} French Land Register data, which excludes lakes, ponds, glaciers > 1 km^{2} (0.386 sq mi or 247 acres) and river estuaries.

La Bazouge-du-Désert (French pronunciation: [la bazuʒ dy dezɛʁ]; Breton: Bazeleg-an-Dezerzh, Gallo: La Bazój-du-Dezèrt) is a commune in the Ille-et-Vilaine department in Brittany in northwestern France.

== Population ==
Historical population
Year	Pop.	±% p.a.
1968	1,340	—
1975	1,280	−0.65%
1982	1,158	−1.42%
1990	1,074	−0.94%
1999	1,012	−0.66%
2007	1,048	+0.44%
2012	1,104	+1.05%
2017	1,087	−0.31%
2023	1,095	+0.12%
Source: INSEE

Inhabitants of La Bazouge-du-Désert are called Bazougeais in French.

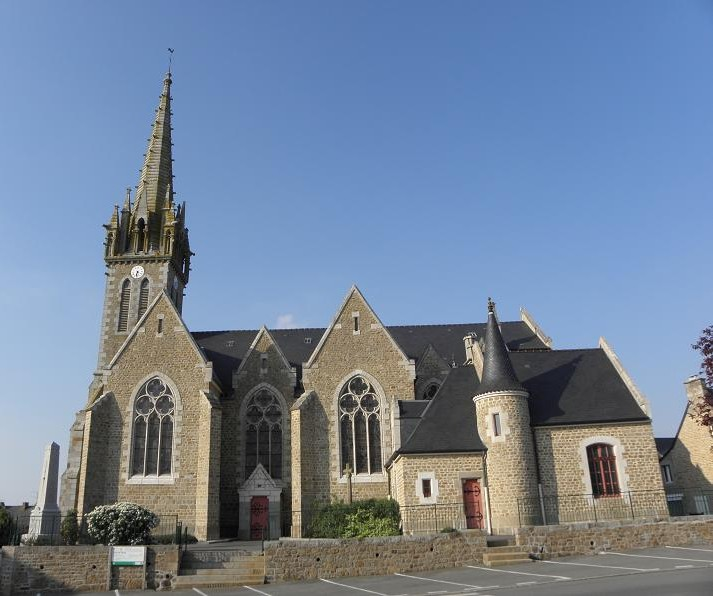
Church of Bazouge du Désert

== See also ==
- Communes of the Ille-et-Vilaine department
