= Yves Fréville =

French politician and academic (1934–2025)

- Born: 1 December 1934; Rennes, France
- Died: 13 December 2025 (aged 91); Rennes, France
- Occupations: Politician, academic

Yves Fréville (1 December 1934 – 13 December 2025) was a French politician and academic.

== Life and career ==
Yves Fréville was born in Rennes, France on 1 December 1934. He was the son of Henri Fréville, former member of parliament and centrist mayor of Rennes.

In 1985, he was a general councillor, elected in the canton of Rennes-Centre-Ouest as well as a municipal councillor for Rennes, sitting in the opposition, from 1983 to 1995.

In 1998, Fréville became a member of parliament of Ille-et-Vilaine.

Fréville died on 13 December 2025, at the age of 91.
