= Louvigné-du-Désert =

Louvigné-du-Désert Louvigneg-an-Dezerzh (Breton)
- Commune
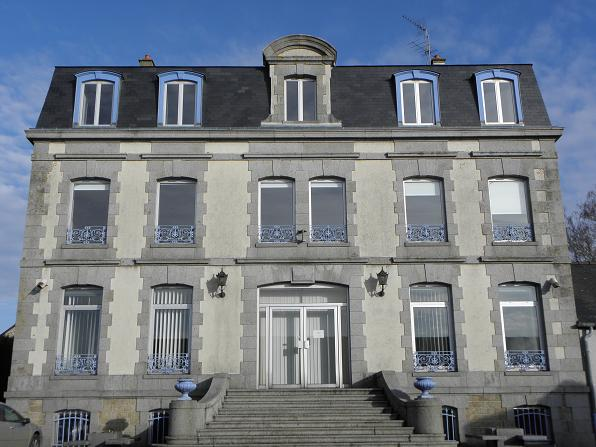
- The town hall of Louvigné-du-Désert
- Location of Louvigné-du-Désert
- Location within France Location within Brittany
- Coordinates: 48°28′57″N 1°07′23″W
- Country: France
- Region: Brittany
- Department: Ille-et-Vilaine
- Arrondissement: Fougères-Vitré
- Canton: Fougères-2
- Intercommunality: Fougères Agglomération

Government
  - Mayor (2020–2026): Jean-Pierre Oger
- Area^{1}: 41.66 km^{2} (16.09 sq mi)
- Highest elevation: 198 m (650 ft)
- Lowest elevation: 97 m (318 ft)
- Population (2023): 3,346
  - Density: 80.32/km^{2} (208.0/sq mi)
- Time zone: UTC+01:00 (CET)
  - Summer (DST): UTC+02:00 (CEST)
- INSEE/Postal code: 35162 /35420
- ^{1} French Land Register data, which excludes lakes, ponds, glaciers > 1 km^{2} (0.386 sq mi or 247 acres) and river estuaries.

Louvigné-du-Désert (French pronunciation: [luviɲe dy dezɛʁ]; Breton: Louvigneg-an-Dezerzh) is a commune in the Ille-et-Vilaine department in Brittany in northwestern France.

== Population ==
Inhabitants of Louvigné-du-Désert are called Louvignéens in French.

Historical population
Year	Pop.	±% p.a.
1968	3,983	—
1975	4,298	+1.09%
1982	4,445	+0.48%
1990	4,260	−0.53%
1999	4,034	−0.60%
2007	3,797	−0.75%
2012	3,524	−1.48%
2017	3,374	−0.87%
2023	3,346	−0.14%
Source: INSEE

== See also ==
- Communes of the Ille-et-Vilaine department
