= Louis Grivart =

French lawyer and politician

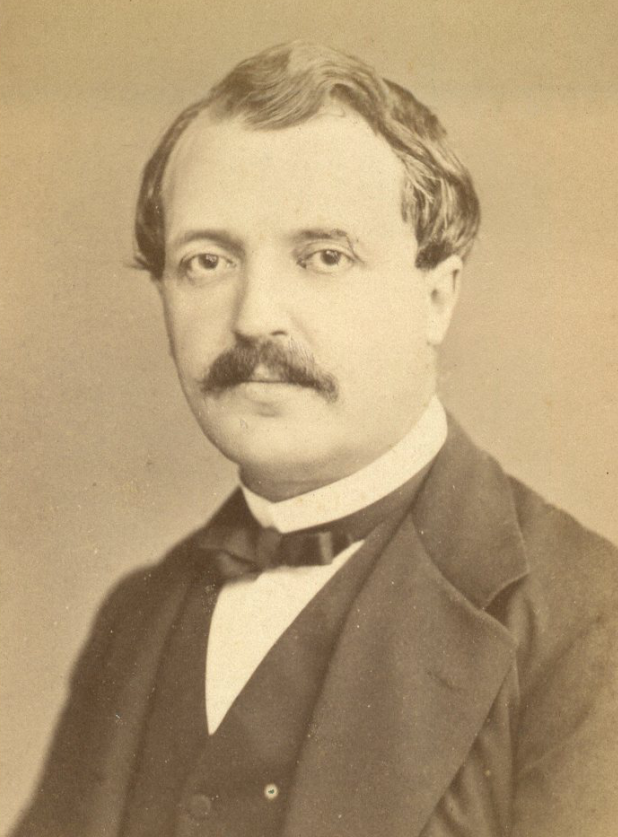

Louis Grivart (30 July 1829 – 3 August 1901) was a French lawyer and politician. He was Minister of Agriculture and of Commerce in Ernest Courtot de Cissey's government from May 1874 until March 1875.
