= Cerdon, Loiret =

Cerdon
- Commune
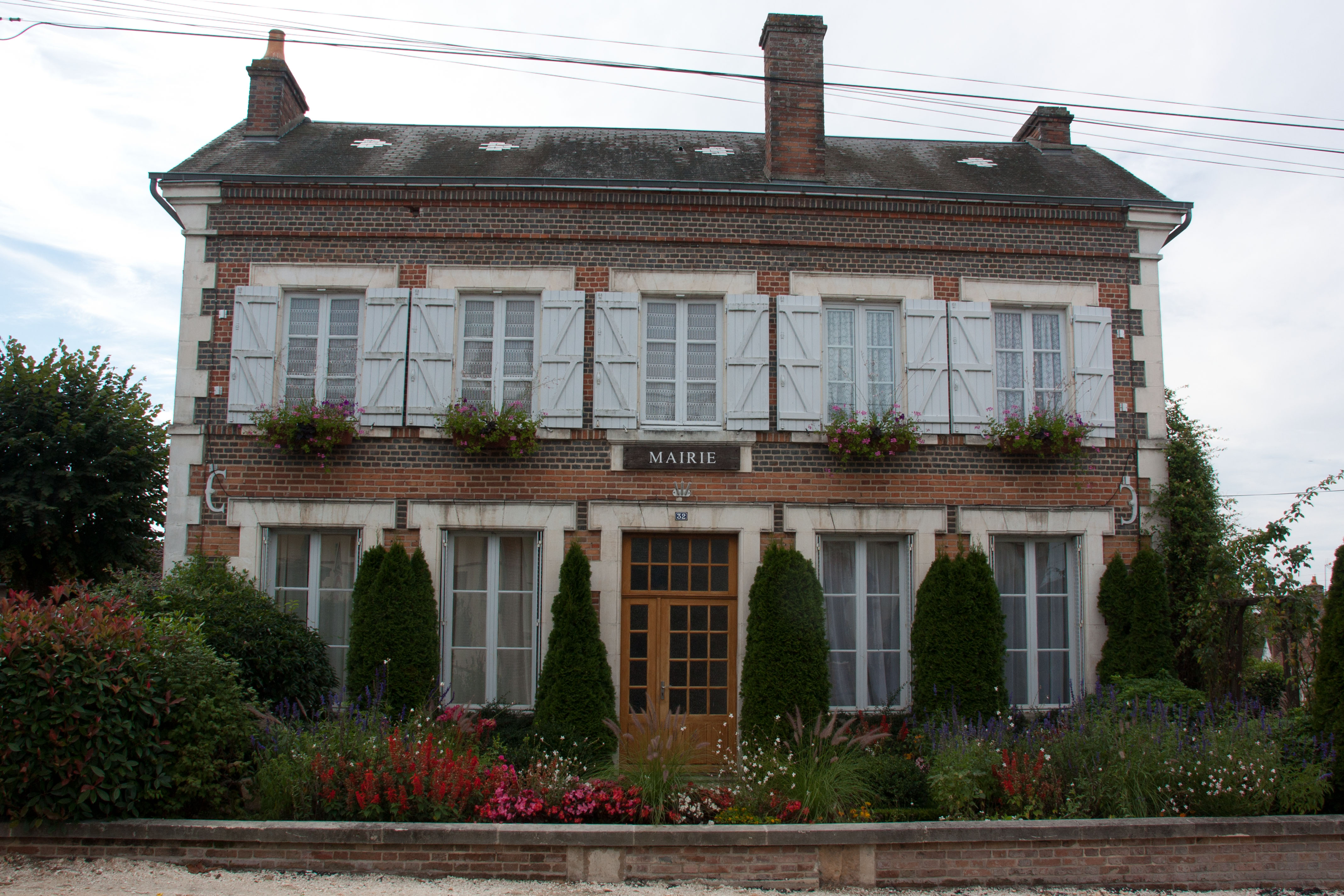
- The town hall in Cerdon

- Coat of arms
- Location of Cerdon
- Location within France Location within Centre-Val de Loire
- Coordinates: 47°38′15″N 2°21′45″E
- Country: France
- Region: Centre-Val de Loire
- Department: Loiret
- Arrondissement: Orléans
- Canton: Sully-sur-Loire

Government
  - Mayor (2020–2026): Alain Mottais
- Area^{1}: 67.3 km^{2} (26.0 sq mi)
- Highest elevation: 172 m (564 ft)
- Lowest elevation: 132 m (433 ft)
- Population (2023): 880
  - Density: 13/km^{2} (34/sq mi)
- Demonym: Cerdonnais
- Time zone: UTC+01:00 (CET)
  - Summer (DST): UTC+02:00 (CEST)
- INSEE/Postal code: 45063 /45620
- ^{1} French Land Register data, which excludes lakes, ponds, glaciers > 1 km^{2} (0.386 sq mi or 247 acres) and river estuaries.

Cerdon (French pronunciation: [sɛʁdɔ̃]) is a commune in the Loiret department in north-central France.

== See also ==
- Communes of the Loiret department
