= Mellé, Ille-et-Vilaine =

Mellé Mèlae (Gallo) Melleg (Breton)
- Commune
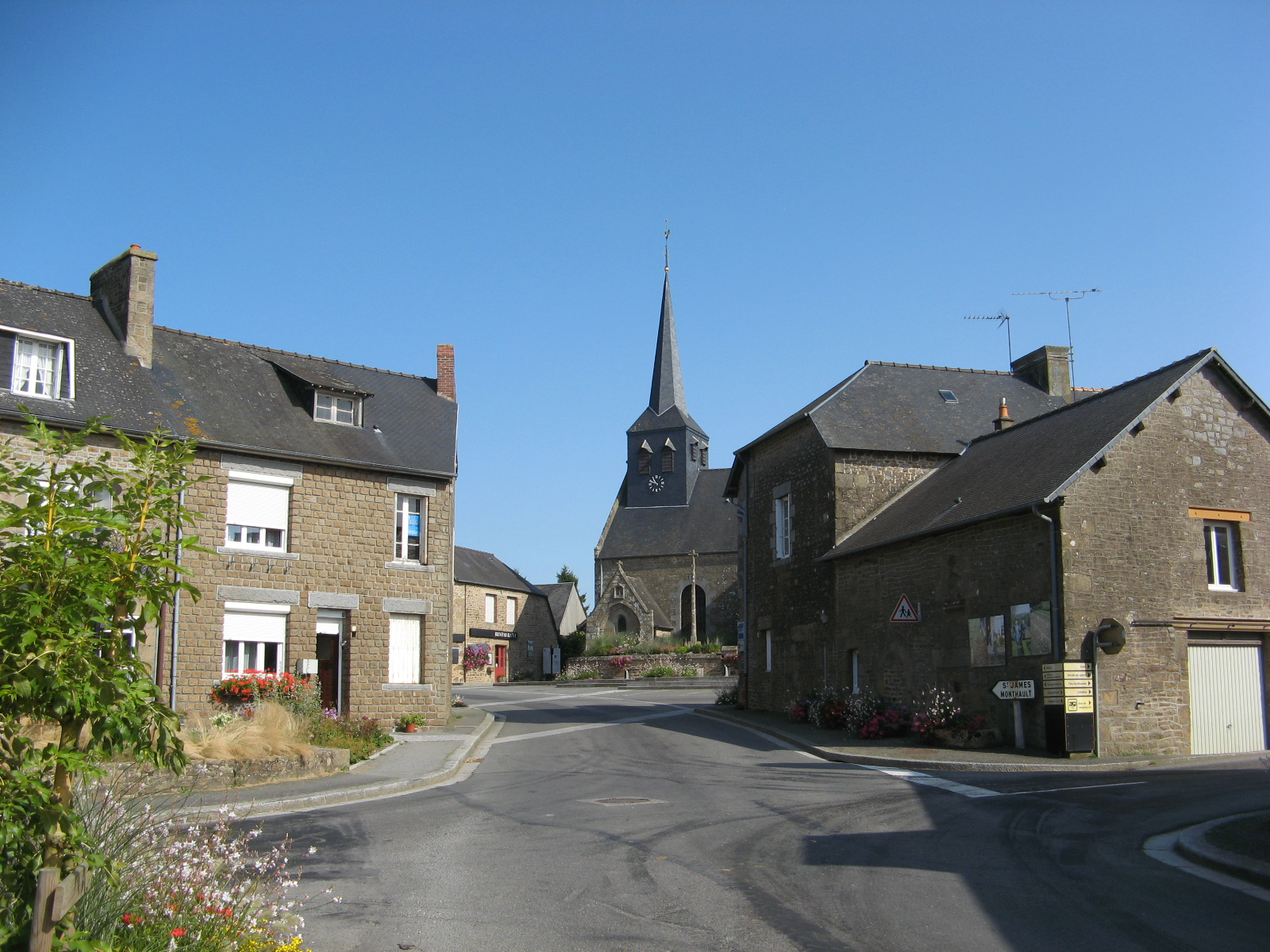
- The village of Mellé
- Location of Mellé
- Location within France Location within Brittany
- Coordinates: 48°29′20″N 1°11′15″W
- Country: France
- Region: Brittany
- Department: Ille-et-Vilaine
- Arrondissement: Fougères-Vitré
- Canton: Fougères-2
- Intercommunality: Fougères Agglomération

Government
  - Mayor (2020–2026): Olivier Poste
- Area^{1}: 15.50 km^{2} (5.98 sq mi)
- Highest elevation: 196 m (643 ft)
- Lowest elevation: 129 m (423 ft)
- Population (2023): 651
  - Density: 42.0/km^{2} (109/sq mi)
- Time zone: UTC+01:00 (CET)
  - Summer (DST): UTC+02:00 (CEST)
- INSEE/Postal code: 35174 /35420
- ^{1} French Land Register data, which excludes lakes, ponds, glaciers > 1 km^{2} (0.386 sq mi or 247 acres) and river estuaries.

Mellé (French pronunciation: [mɛle]; Gallo: Mèlae, Breton: Melleg) is a commune in the Ille-et-Vilaine department in Brittany in northwestern France. It is about 50 km northeast of Rennes.

== Population ==
Inhabitants of Mellé are called Melléens in French.

Historical population
| Year | Pop. | ±% p.a. |
|---|---|---|
| 1968 | 885 | — |
| 1975 | 806 | −1.33% |
| 1982 | 738 | −1.25% |
| 1990 | 706 | −0.55% |
| 1999 | 678 | −0.45% |
| 2007 | 673 | −0.09% |
| 2012 | 668 | −0.15% |
| 2017 | 651 | −0.51% |
| 2023 | 651 | +0.00% |
Source: INSEE

== See also ==
- Communes of the Ille-et-Vilaine department
