= Saint-Georges-de-Reintembault =

Saint-Georges-de-Reintembault Sant-Jord-Restembaod (Breton)
- Commune
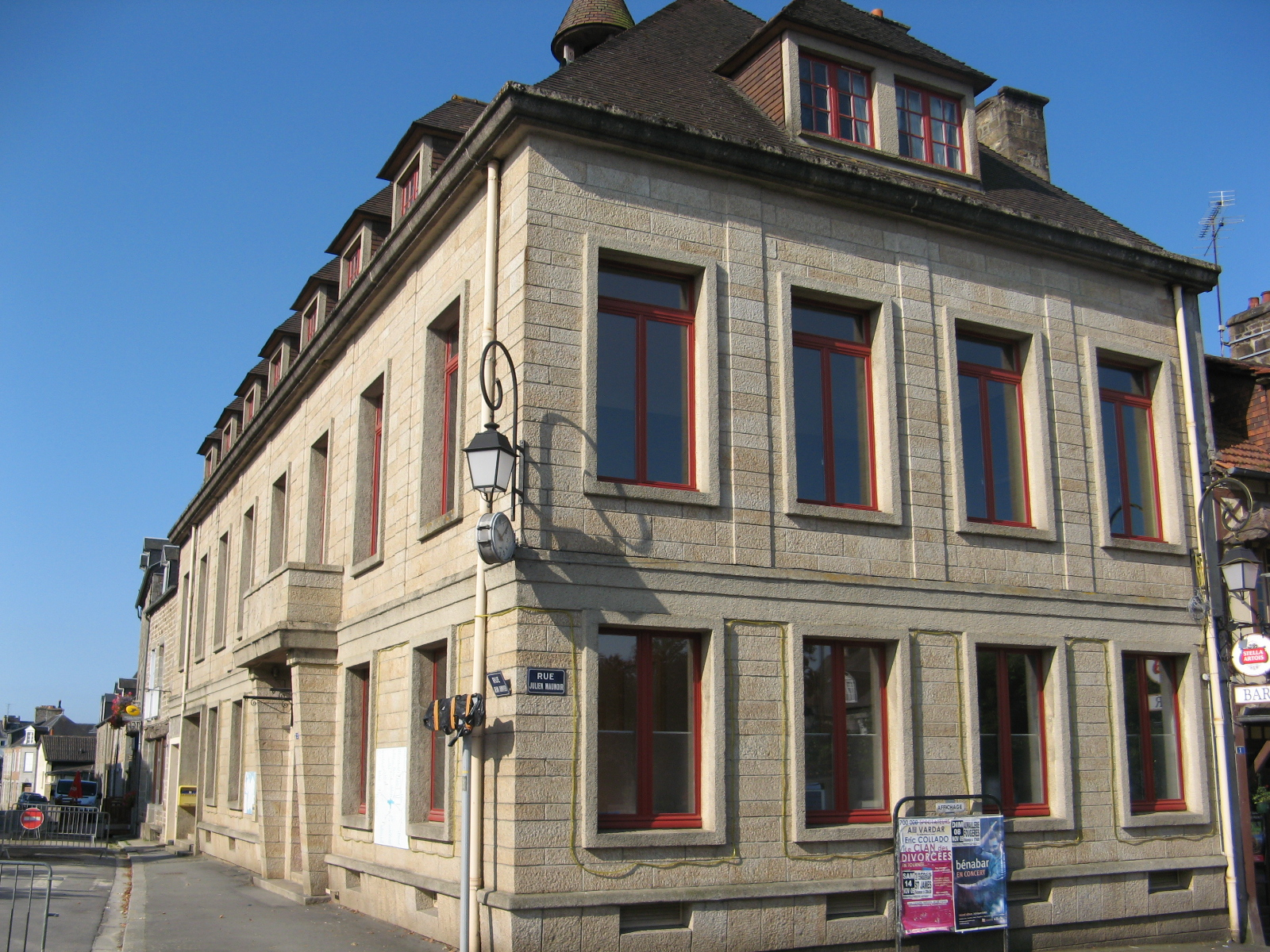
- The town hall of Saint-Georges-de-Reintembault

- Coat of arms
- Location of Saint-Georges-de-Reintembault
- Location within France Location within Brittany
- Coordinates: 48°30′33″N 1°14′32″W
- Country: France
- Region: Brittany
- Department: Ille-et-Vilaine
- Arrondissement: Fougères-Vitré
- Canton: Fougères-2
- Intercommunality: Fougères Agglomération

Government
  - Mayor (2020–2026): Marie-Claire Boucher
- Area^{1}: 31.02 km^{2} (11.98 sq mi)
- Highest elevation: 180 m (590 ft)
- Lowest elevation: 94 m (308 ft)
- Population (2023): 1,541
  - Density: 49.68/km^{2} (128.7/sq mi)
- Time zone: UTC+01:00 (CET)
  - Summer (DST): UTC+02:00 (CEST)
- INSEE/Postal code: 35271 /35420
- ^{1} French Land Register data, which excludes lakes, ponds, glaciers > 1 km^{2} (0.386 sq mi or 247 acres) and river estuaries.

Saint-Georges-de-Reintembault (French pronunciation: [sɛ̃ ʒɔʁʒ də ʁɛ̃tɑ̃bo]; Breton: Sant-Jord-Restembaod) is a commune in the Ille-et-Vilaine department of Brittany in northwestern France.

== Population ==
Inhabitants of Saint-Georges-de-Reintembault are called reintembaultois in French.

Historical population
Year	Pop.	±% p.a.
1968	2,049	—
1975	1,818	−1.69%
1982	1,795	−0.18%
1990	1,747	−0.34%
1999	1,682	−0.42%
2007	1,626	−0.42%
2012	1,608	−0.22%
2017	1,498	−1.41%
2023	1,541	+0.47%
Source: INSEE

== See also ==
- Communes of the Ille-et-Vilaine department
