= La Selle-en-Luitré =

La Selle-en-Luitré Kell-Loezherieg (Breton)
- Commune
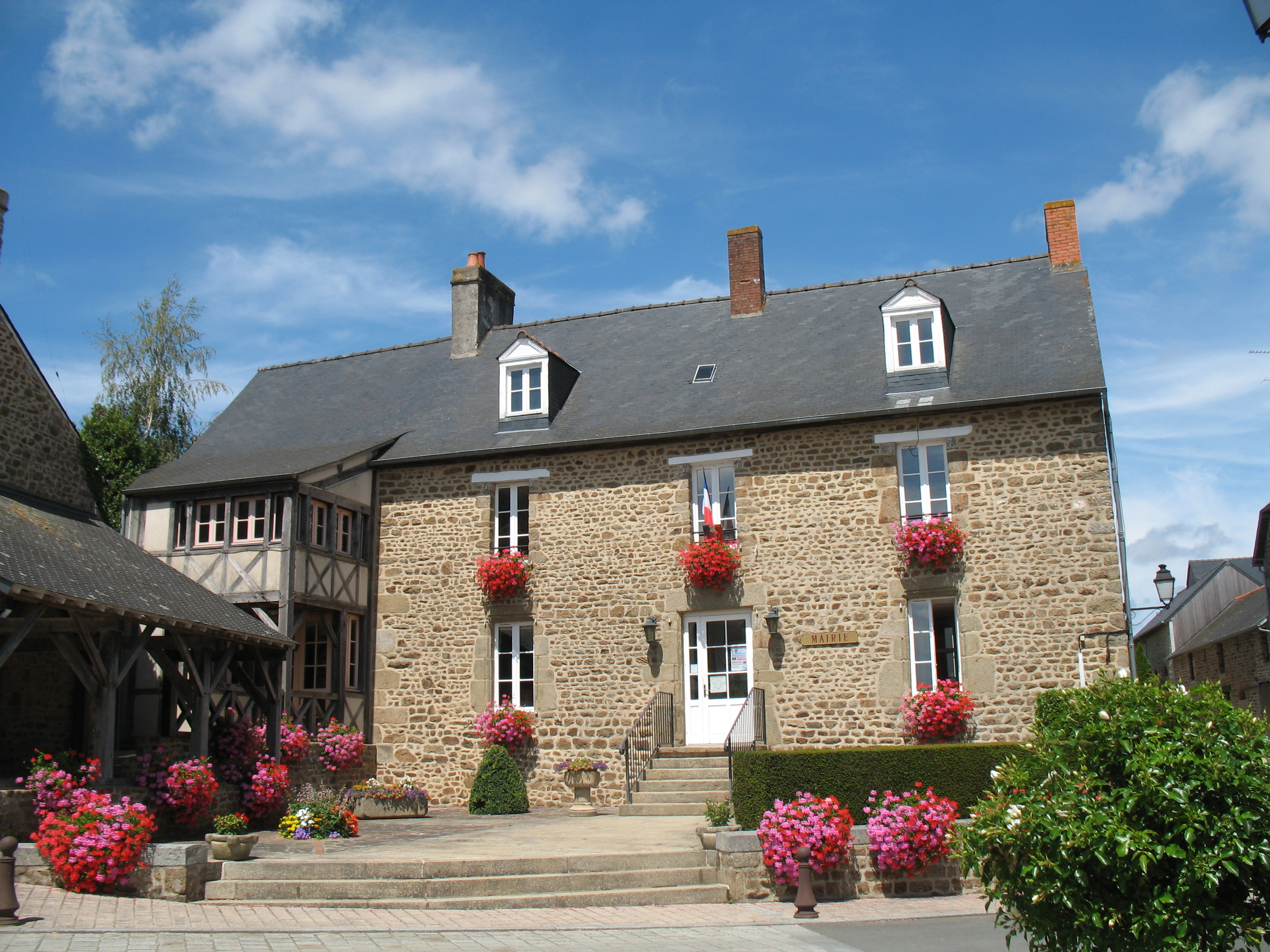
- Town hall

- Coat of arms
- Location of La Selle-en-Luitré
- Location within France Location within Brittany
- Coordinates: 48°18′41″N 1°07′36″W
- Country: France
- Region: Brittany
- Department: Ille-et-Vilaine
- Arrondissement: Fougères-Vitré
- Canton: Fougères-2
- Intercommunality: Fougères Agglomération

Government
  - Mayor (2020–2026): Denis Chopin
- Area^{1}: 7.32 km^{2} (2.83 sq mi)
- Highest elevation: 122 m (400 ft)
- Lowest elevation: 70 m (230 ft)
- Population (2023): 582
  - Density: 79.5/km^{2} (206/sq mi)
- Time zone: UTC+01:00 (CET)
  - Summer (DST): UTC+02:00 (CEST)
- INSEE/Postal code: 35324 /35133
- ^{1} French Land Register data, which excludes lakes, ponds, glaciers > 1 km^{2} (0.386 sq mi or 247 acres) and river estuaries.

La Selle-en-Luitré (French pronunciation: [la sɛl ɑ̃ lɥitʁe]; Breton: Kell-Loezherieg) is a commune in the Ille-et-Vilaine department in Brittany in northwestern France.

== Population ==
Inhabitants of La Selle-en-Luitré are called Sellois in French.

Historical population
Year	Pop.	±% p.a.
1968	350	—
1975	323	−1.14%
1982	347	+1.03%
1990	385	+1.31%
1999	425	+1.10%
2007	532	+2.85%
2012	582	+1.81%
2017	613	+1.04%
2023	582	−0.86%
Source: INSEE

== See also ==
- Communes of the Ille-et-Vilaine department
