= Le Loroux =

Le Loroux Lavreer-an-Dezerzh (Breton)
- Commune
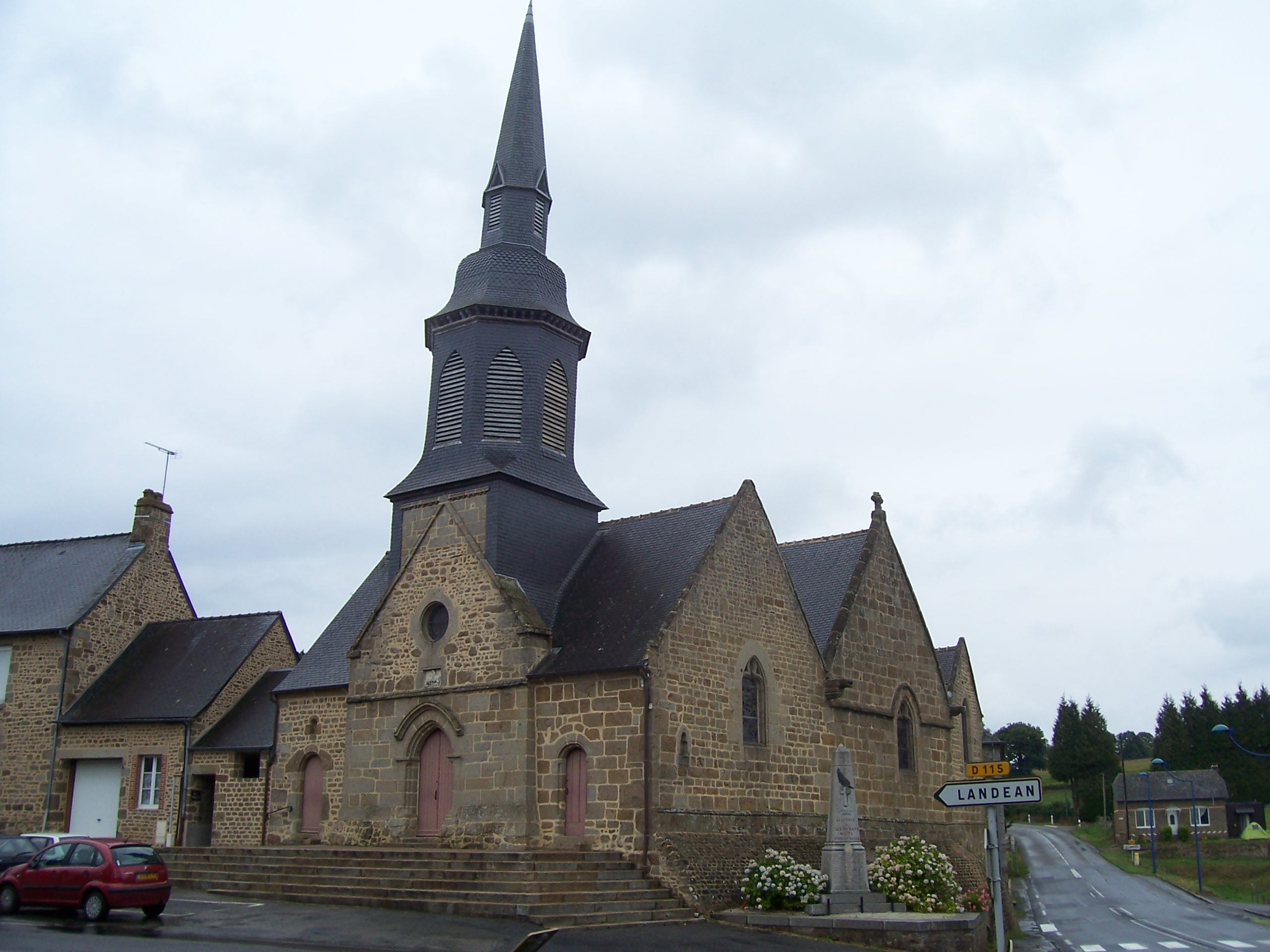
- The church of Saint-Martin, in Loroux
- Location of Le Loroux
- Location within France Location within Brittany
- Coordinates: 48°23′44″N 1°03′47″W
- Country: France
- Region: Brittany
- Department: Ille-et-Vilaine
- Arrondissement: Fougères-Vitré
- Canton: Fougères-2
- Intercommunality: Fougères Agglomération

Government
  - Mayor (2020–2026): Jean-Claude Brard
- Area^{1}: 11.56 km^{2} (4.46 sq mi)
- Highest elevation: 244 m (801 ft)
- Lowest elevation: 148 m (486 ft)
- Population (2023): 621
  - Density: 53.7/km^{2} (139/sq mi)
- Time zone: UTC+01:00 (CET)
  - Summer (DST): UTC+02:00 (CEST)
- INSEE/Postal code: 35157 /35133
- ^{1} French Land Register data, which excludes lakes, ponds, glaciers > 1 km^{2} (0.386 sq mi or 247 acres) and river estuaries.

Le Loroux (French pronunciation: [lə lɔʁu]; Breton: Lavreer-an-Dezerzh) is a commune in the Ille-et-Vilaine department in Brittany in northwestern France.

== Population ==
Inhabitants of Le Loroux are called Lorousiens in French.

Historical population
Year	Pop.	±% p.a.
1968	628	—
1975	566	−1.47%
1982	548	−0.46%
1990	515	−0.77%
1999	520	+0.11%
2007	531	+0.26%
2012	659	+4.41%
2017	653	−0.18%
2023	621	−0.83%
Source: INSEE

== See also ==
- Communes of the Ille-et-Vilaine department
