= 2004 French cantonal elections =

Cantonal elections to elect half the membership of the general councils of France's 100 departments were held on 21 and 28 March 2004. These elections coincided with the left's landslide in the regional elections held at the same time and also resulted in strong performances by the Socialist Party (PS) and its allies on the left, leaving the Socialists in control of a majority of departments.

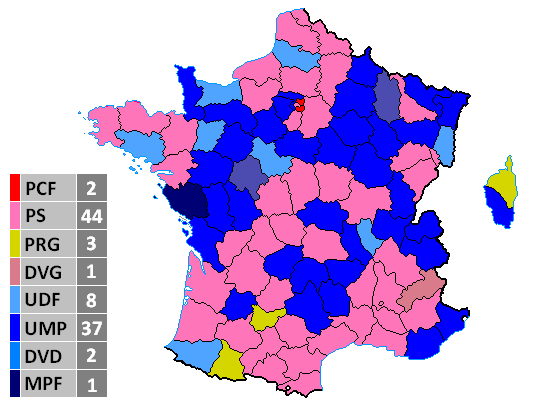
Map showing the political affiliations of general council presidencies in the departments of metropolitan France following the cantonal elections of 2004

== Electoral system ==
The cantonal elections use a two-round system similar to that employed in the country's legislative elections.

- Councillors are elected from single-member constituencies (the cantons).
- A candidate securing the votes of at least 25% of the canton's registered voters and more than 50% of the total number of votes actually cast in the first round of voting is thereby elected. If no candidate satisfies these conditions, then a second round of voting is held one week later.
- Entitled to present themselves in the second round are the two candidates who received the highest number of votes in the first round, plus any other candidate or candidates who received the votes of at least 10% of those registered to vote in the canton.
- In the second round, the candidate receiving the highest number of votes is elected.

== Change in control ==
=== From right to left ===
- Hautes-Alpes (DVG)
- Charente (PS)
- Cher (PS)
- Doubs (PS)
- Drôme(PS)
- Ille-et-Vilaine (PS)
- Loire-Atlantique (PS)
- Oise (PS)
- Saône-et-Loire (PS)
- Seine-Maritime (PS)
- Seine-et-Marne (PS)

=== From left to right ===
- Corse-du-Sud (UMP)

== National results ==
Party/Alliance	General council Presidencies	Votes	% (first round)	Votes	% (second round)
PS	44	3,226,525	26.25%	4,010,716	38.56%
UMP	37	2,574,331	20.94%	2,831,478	27.22%
UDF	8	584,587	4.76%	484,204	4.65%
PRG	3	156,305	1.27%	134,365	1.29%
PCF	2	957,223	7.80%	492,815	4.74%
Miscellaneous Left	2	740,521	6.02%	616,631	5.93%
Miscellaneous Right	2	1,396,741	11.36%	1,103,938	10.61%
MPF	1	see DVD	see DVD	see DVD	see DVD
Miscellaneous	1	132,883	1.08%	83,622	0.80%
FN	0	1,490,315	12.13%	502,973	4.84%
Les Verts	0	502,142	4.09%	101,434	0.98%
Far-Left	0	367,817	2.99%	6,271	0.06%
Regionalists	0	50,143	0.41%	13,180	0.13%
Ecologists	0	48,838	0.40%	4,588	0.04%
MNR	0	44,251	0.36%	11,620	0.11%
CPNT	0	17,786	0.14%	4,358	0.04%

== Sources ==
E-P

Ministry of the Interior results
