= Laignelet =

Laignelet Leingelaé (Gallo) Kernoanig (Breton)
- Commune
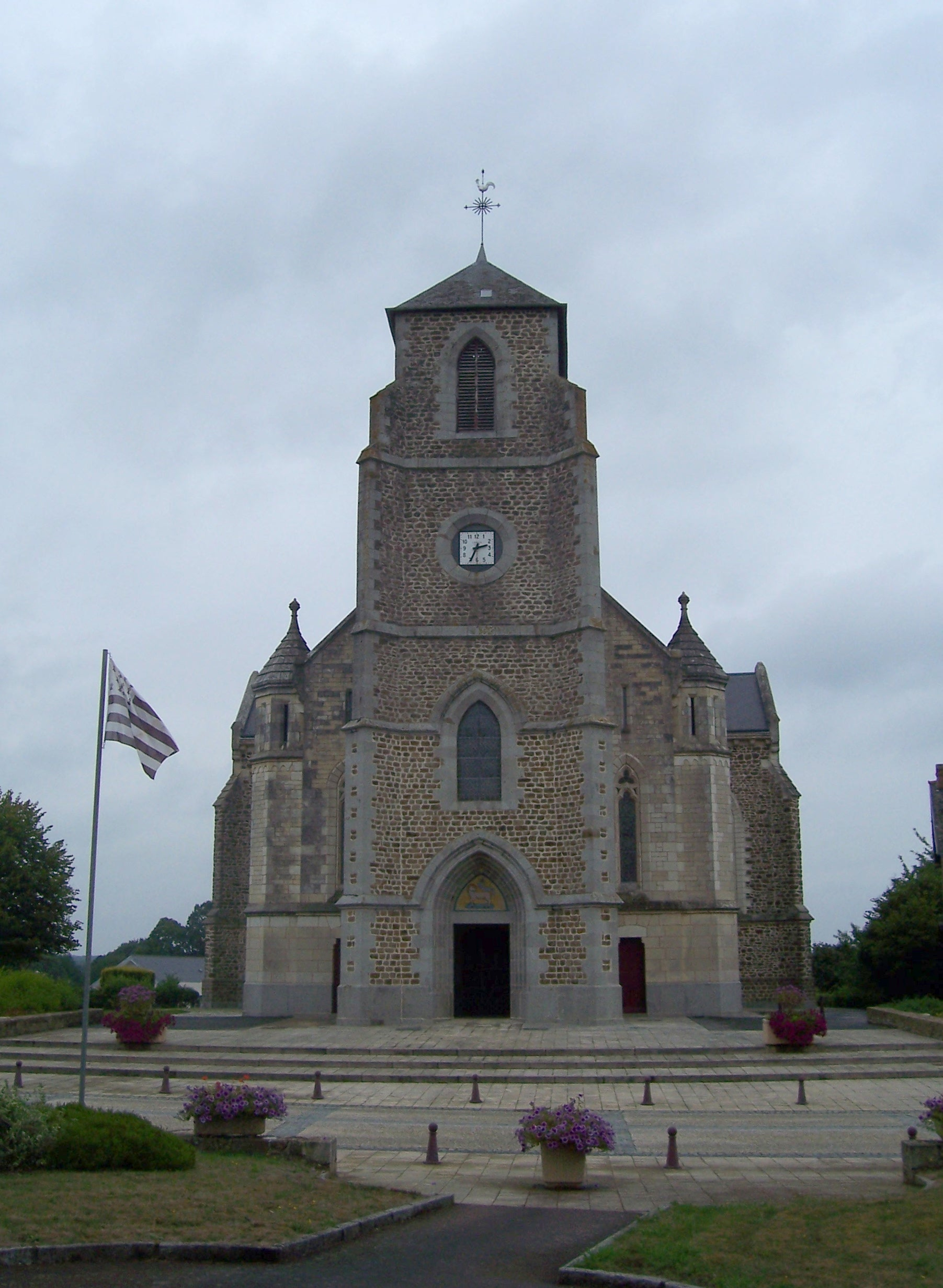
- The church of Saint-Martin

- Coat of arms
- Location of Laignelet
- Location within France Location within Brittany
- Coordinates: 48°22′18″N 1°08′55″W
- Country: France
- Region: Brittany
- Department: Ille-et-Vilaine
- Arrondissement: Fougères-Vitré
- Canton: Fougères-2
- Intercommunality: Fougères Agglomération

Government
  - Mayor (2020–2026): André Philipot
- Area^{1}: 14.83 km^{2} (5.73 sq mi)
- Highest elevation: 231 m (758 ft)
- Lowest elevation: 104 m (341 ft)
- Population (2023): 1,234
  - Density: 83.21/km^{2} (215.5/sq mi)
- Time zone: UTC+01:00 (CET)
  - Summer (DST): UTC+02:00 (CEST)
- INSEE/Postal code: 35138 /35133
- ^{1} French Land Register data, which excludes lakes, ponds, glaciers > 1 km^{2} (0.386 sq mi or 247 acres) and river estuaries.

Laignelet (French pronunciation: [lɛɲlɛ]; Gallo : Leingelaé, Breton: Kernoanig) is a commune in the Ille-et-Vilaine department of Brittany in north-western France.

== Population ==
Inhabitants of Laignelet are called Agnelais in French.

Historical population
Year	Pop.	±% p.a.
1968	479	—
1975	601	+3.29%
1982	641	+0.92%
1990	727	+1.59%
1999	789	+0.91%
2007	862	+1.11%
2012	1,083	+4.67%
2017	1,163	+1.44%
2023	1,234	+0.99%
Source: INSEE

== See also ==
- Communes of the Ille-et-Vilaine department
