= Beaucé =

Beaucé Bauczaé (Gallo) Belzeg (Breton)
- Commune
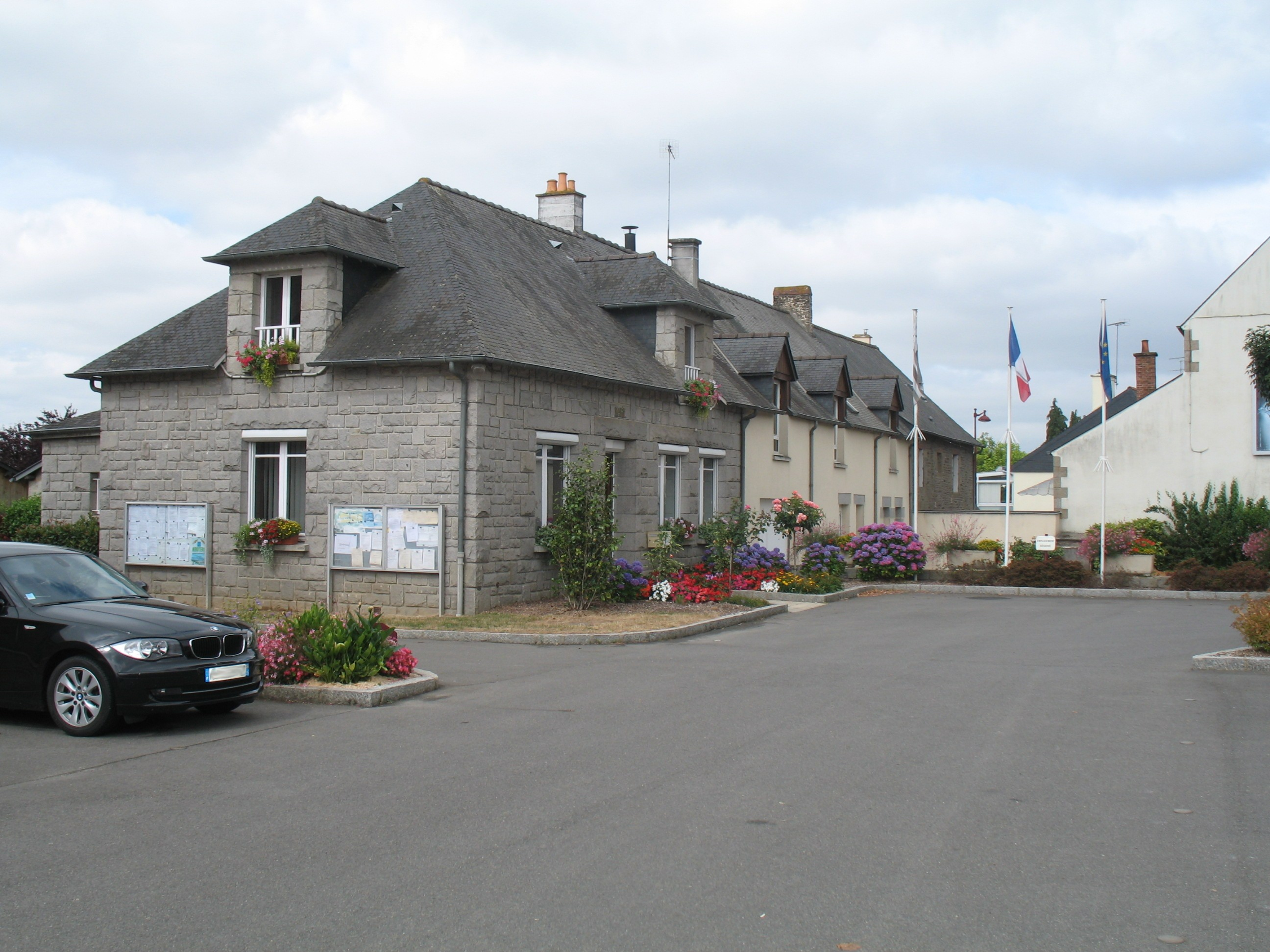
- Town hall

- Coat of arms
- Location of Beaucé
- Location within France Location within Brittany
- Coordinates: 48°20′20″N 1°09′20″W
- Country: France
- Region: Brittany
- Department: Ille-et-Vilaine
- Arrondissement: Fougères-Vitré
- Canton: Fougères-2
- Intercommunality: Fougères Agglomération

Government
  - Mayor (2020–2026): Stéphane Idlas
- Area^{1}: 8.17 km^{2} (3.15 sq mi)
- Elevation: 94 m (308 ft)
- Highest elevation: 188 m (617 ft)
- Lowest elevation: 70 m (230 ft)
- Population (2023): 1,256
  - Density: 154/km^{2} (398/sq mi)
- Time zone: UTC+01:00 (CET)
  - Summer (DST): UTC+02:00 (CEST)
- INSEE/Postal code: 35021 /35133
- ^{1} French Land Register data, which excludes lakes, ponds, glaciers > 1 km^{2} (0.386 sq mi or 247 acres) and river estuaries.

Beaucé (French pronunciation: [bose]; Breton: Belzeg, Gallo: Bauczaé) is a commune in the Ille-et-Vilaine department in Brittany in northwestern France.

== Population ==
Historical population
Year	Pop.	±% p.a.
1968	400	—
1975	632	+6.75%
1982	974	+6.37%
1990	1,055	+1.00%
1999	1,056	+0.01%
2007	1,161	+1.19%
2012	1,283	+2.02%
2017	1,365	+1.25%
2023	1,256	−1.38%
Source: INSEE

Inhabitants of Beaucé are called Beaucéens in French.

== See also ==
- Communes of the Ille-et-Vilaine department
