= Canton of Fougères-2 =

Coordinates: 48.36°N 1.19°W

- Canton
- Country: France
- Region: Brittany
- Department: Ille-et-Vilaine
- No. of communes: {{{nbcomm}}}
- Population (2023): 32,899
- INSEE code: 35 09

The canton of Fougères-2 is an administrative division of the Ille-et-Vilaine department, in northwestern France. It was created at the French canton reorganisation which came into effect in March 2015. Its seat is in Fougères. The Canton of Fougères-2 covers specific areas and municipalities within the Fougères Agglomération and is represented by elected officials who serve on the departmental council. These officials are responsible for addressing local issues, representing the interests of their constituents, and participating in decision-making processes at the departmental level.

It consists of the following communes:

1. La Bazouge-du-Désert
2. Beaucé
3. La Chapelle-Fleurigné
4. Le Ferré
5. Fougères (partly)
6. Laignelet
7. Landéan
8. Le Loroux
9. Louvigné-du-Désert
10. Luitré-Dompierre
11. Mellé
12. Monthault
13. Parigné
14. Poilley
15. Saint-Georges-de-Reintembault
16. La Selle-en-Luitré
17. Villamée
