= Canton of Saint-Aubin-du-Cormier =

Coordinates: 48°17′46″N 1°22′48″W

Saint-Aubin-du-Cormier
- Former canton
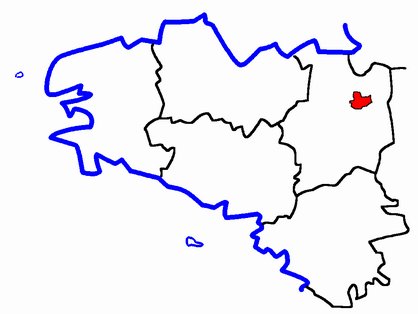
- Country: France
- Region: Brittany
- Department: Ille-et-Vilaine
- No. of communes: {{{nbcomm}}}
- Disbanded: 2015
- Area: 147 km^{2} (57 sq mi)
- Population (2012): 11,636
  - Density: 79.2/km^{2} (205/sq mi)

The canton of Saint-Aubin-du-Cormier is a former canton of France, located in the arrondissement of Fougères-Vitré, in the Ille-et-Vilaine département, Brittany region of France. It had 11,636 inhabitants (2012). It was disbanded following the French canton reorganisation which came into effect in March 2015. It consisted of 10 communes, which joined the canton of Fougères-1 in 2015.

== Composition ==
The canton comprised the following communes:

- La Chapelle-Saint-Aubert
- Gosné
- Mézières-sur-Couesnon
- Saint-Aubin-du-Cormier
- Saint-Christophe-de-Valains
- Saint-Georges-de-Chesné
- Saint-Jean-sur-Couesnon
- Saint-Marc-sur-Couesnon
- Saint-Ouen-des-Alleux
- Vendel
