= Canton of Fougères-Sud =

Coordinates: 48°18′52″N 1°13′39″W

Fougères-Sud
- Former canton
- Interactive map of Fougères-Sud
- Country: France
- Region: Brittany
- Department: Ille-et-Vilaine
- No. of communes: {{{nbcomm}}}
- Disbanded: 2015
- Population (2012): 19,008

The Canton of Fougères-Sud is a former canton of France, in the Ille-et-Vilaine département. It had 19,008 inhabitants (2012). It was disbanded following the French canton reorganisation which came into effect in March 2015.

The canton comprised the following communes:

- Billé
- Combourtillé
- Dompierre-du-Chemin
- Fougères (fraction)
- Javené
- Lécousse
- Parcé
- Romagné
- Saint-Sauveur-des-Landes
