= Saint-Georges-de-Chesné =

Saint-Georges-de-Chesné Sant-Jord-Kadeneg
- Part of Rives-du-Couesnon
- The church of Saint-Georges, in Saint-Georges-de-Chesné
- Location of Saint-Georges-de-Chesné
- Location within France Location within Brittany
- Coordinates: 48°16′28″N 1°17′24″W
- Country: France
- Region: Brittany
- Department: Ille-et-Vilaine
- Arrondissement: Fougères-Vitré
- Canton: Fougères-1
- Commune: Rives-du-Couesnon
- Area^{1}: 11.62 km^{2} (4.49 sq mi)
- Elevation: 90 m (300 ft)
- Highest elevation: 122 m (400 ft)
- Lowest elevation: 58 m (190 ft)
- Population (2023): 704
  - Density: 60.6/km^{2} (157/sq mi)
- Time zone: UTC+01:00 (CET)
  - Summer (DST): UTC+02:00 (CEST)
- Postal code: 35140
- ^{1} French Land Register data, which excludes lakes, ponds, glaciers > 1 km^{2} (0.386 sq mi or 247 acres) and river estuaries.

Saint-Georges-de-Chesné (French pronunciation: [sɛ̃ ʒɔʁʒ də ʃɛne]; Breton: Sant-Jord-Kadeneg) is a former commune in the Ille-et-Vilaine department in Brittany in northwestern France. On 1 January 2019, it was merged into the new commune Rives-du-Couesnon.

== Geography ==
Saint-Georges-de-Chesné is located 38 km (24 mi) northeast of Rennes and 49 km (30 mi) south of the Mont Saint-Michel.

The adjacent communes are Vendel, Billé, Combourtillé, Mecé, Livré-sur-Changeon, Saint-Aubin-du-Cormier, and Saint-Jean-sur-Couesnon.

== See also ==
- Communes of the Ille-et-Vilaine department
