= 2023 French Elite Motocross Championship =

French Motocross Competition in 2023

The 2023 French Elite Motocross Championship season was the 75th French Motocross Championship season.

The series consisted of seven rounds across the country, running from March to July. Milko Potisek was the reigning champion in the Elite MX1, after winning his first title in 2022. However, it would be Swiss grand prix rider Valentin Guillod who would be crowned champion for the first time.

Pierre Goupillon was the reigning champion in Elite MX2 after he won his second title in the previous season. Goupillon was able to successfully defend his title again, winning it with two rounds to spare.

== Race calendar and results ==
=== Elite MX1 ===
Round	Date	Location	Race 1 Winner	Race 2 Winner	Round Winner
1	5 March	(Occitania) Lacapelle-Marival	(Netherlands) Jeffrey Herlings	(Netherlands) Jeffrey Herlings	(Netherlands) Jeffrey Herlings
2	19 March	(Occitania) Castelnau-de-Lévis	(France) Stephen Rubini	(France) Gregory Aranda	(France) Stephen Rubini
3	2 April	(Brittany) Romagné	(Netherlands) Jeffrey Herlings	(Netherlands) Jeffrey Herlings	(Netherlands) Jeffrey Herlings
4	23 April	(Bourgogne-Franche-Comté) Vesoul	(France) Xavier Boog	(Switzerland) Valentin Guillod	(France) Stephen Rubini
5	7 May	(Grand Est) Bitche	(Germany) Max Nagl	(France) Milko Potisek	(France) Milko Potisek
6	18 June	(Normandy) Rauville-la-Place	(Switzerland) Valentin Guillod	(France) Xavier Boog	(France) Anthony Bourdon
7	2 July	(Brittany) Iffendic	(France) Stephen Rubini	(France) Xavier Boog	(France) Stephen Rubini

=== Elite MX2 ===
Round	Date	Location	Race 1 Winner	Race 2 Winner	Round Winner
1	5 March	(Occitania) Lacapelle-Marival	(Belgium) Lucas Coenen	(Belgium) Lucas Coenen	(Belgium) Lucas Coenen
2	19 March	(Occitania) Castelnau-de-Lévis	(France) Pierre Goupillon	(France) Quentin Prugnières	(France) Pierre Goupillon
3	2 April	(Brittany) Romagné	(France) Pierre Goupillon	(France) Marc-Antoine Rossi	(France) Marc-Antoine Rossi
4	23 April	(Bourgogne-Franche-Comté) Vesoul	(France) Pierre Goupillon	(France) Pierre Goupillon	(France) Pierre Goupillon
5	7 May	(Grand Est) Bitche	(France) Pierre Goupillon	(France) Pierre Goupillon	(France) Pierre Goupillon
6	18 June	(Normandy) Rauville-la-Place	(France) Florian Miot	(France) Maxime Desprey	(France) Quentin Prugnières
7	2 July	(Brittany) Iffendic	(France) Quentin Prugnières	(France) Pierre Goupillon	(France) Quentin Prugnières

=== Circuit locations ===
2023 French Elite Motocross Championship locations

== Elite MX1 ==
Five time world champion Jeffrey Herlings competed in the opening round of the series as preparation for the 2023 FIM Motocross World Championship.

=== Participants ===
Team	Constructor	No	Rider	Rounds
KMP Honda Racing powered by Krettek	Honda	12	(Germany) Max Nagl	5
KMP Honda Racing powered by Krettek	Honda	107	(Netherlands) Lars van Berkel	5
KMP Honda Racing powered by Krettek	Honda	952	(France) Ludovic Macler	5
Roussaly Racing Team	Yamaha	15	(France) Hugo Roussaly	1
Team GSM Dafy Michelin Yamaha	Yamaha	20	(France) Gregory Aranda	All
Team GSM Dafy Michelin Yamaha	Yamaha	121	(France) Xavier Boog	All
Team TMX Competition	Yamaha	31	(France) Adrien Malaval	All
MP32 Yamaha Drag'On Tek	Yamaha	32	(France) Milko Potisek	1–5
Holeshot2Roo	Honda	38	(France) Pierre Moine	1
Sky Motos/Kawa Passion	Kawasaki	70	(France) Shaun Vinel	1
Team Berryli4ni	Kawasaki	74	(France) Romain Pape	1, 3
Team Berryli4ni	Kawasaki	817	(France) Jason Clermont	3, 6–7
Red Bull KTM Factory Racing	KTM	84	(Netherlands) Jeffrey Herlings	1, 3
	Yamaha	86	(France) Alexandre Grondin	3
	KTM	91	(France) Mathieu Letellier	6
Team Ship to Cycle Honda Motoblouz SR	Honda	92	(Switzerland) Valentin Guillod	1–4, 6
Team Ship to Cycle Honda Motoblouz SR	Honda	105	(Belgium) Cyril Genot	5–6
Team Ship to Cycle Honda Motoblouz SR	Honda	138	(France) Stephen Rubini	All
Team Ship to Cycle Honda Motoblouz SR	Honda	225	(France) Charles Lefrançois	3
Team FT103	Honda	103	(France) Fabien Touffet	3
Team LMSens	Yamaha	145	(France) Loic Rombaut	5
Team VHR Racing	Gas Gas	156	(France) Maxime Sot	All
	Gas Gas	169	(France) Martin Dubois	1, 4–5
	Kawasaki	171	(France) Melvrick Eblin	2
Team MB172	Husqvarna	172	(France) Mathys Boisramé	1–4, 6–7
Team Bauerschmidt MB33	Husqvarna	188	(Germany) Stefan Ekerold	5
	Sherco	191	(France) Jimmy Auvray	6
LeBlockPass	Husqvarna	195	(France) Loïs Carlier	3
L2H Design Armor Moto	Kawasaki	212	(France) Julien Cabioch	7
	Husqvarna	218	(France) Gregory Gavard	5
Team KB Academy	Yamaha	221	(France) Kevin Ballanger	2
NG Kit Deco/MotoTeam81	KTM	248	(France) Ludovic Bompar	2
Yam Sand Racing	Yamaha	249	(France) Mathéo Miot	6
Team WID Motorsport	KTM	320	(France) Dorian Werlé	3, 6–7
Team BHM Racing	Honda	323	(France) Nicolas Cottenet	1–2
Vrignon Construction	KTM	338	(France) David Herbreteau	1–3, 6
LF Motorsport	Honda	376	(France) Adrien Lamour	1, 6
	Honda	392	(France) Josselin Cochennec	7
	KTM	400	(France) Florent Becker	5
JSM	Honda	410	(France) Vincent Corre	3, 7
Yamaha Motor France Drag'On Tek	Yamaha	424	(France) Valentin Madoulaud	5
	Yamaha	433	(France) Tom Provost	3
Couleurs Moto/47Design	KTM	448	(France) Tony Seignobos	1–2, 4
	Yamaha	486	(France) Thomas Le Bihan	7
JSL 83 Kawasaki Toulon	Kawasaki	519	(France) William Dho	1–5
Mekanik Annecy	Honda	520	(France) Jimmy Clochet	1–5
	Honda	530	(France) Anthony Blanchet	6
	Kawasaki	544	(France) Quentin Boudot	1, 4
	KTM	546	(France) Victor Legeard	7
	KTM	547	(France) Alexandre Lejeune	4
	Honda	557	(France) Julien Roussel	4
Podium Motos	Kawasaki	571	(France) Matéo Bouly	3, 6–7
	Honda	646	(France) Jordan Robidou	7
	KTM	699	(France) Mathis Anne	6
Floride Moto/GVP Marseille	Kawasaki	725	(France) Antonin Mille	All
	Honda	740	(France) Benjamin Poissonnier	4
Krismotos Challans	Yamaha	752	(France) Julien Pelletier	1, 3, 6–7
Almax Motos	Husqvarna	758	(France) Raffael Blond	2, 4, 6
GCC Swiss Racing Team	Husqvarna	760	(Switzerland) Nicolas Bender	5
STS Stocker	Yamaha	783	(France) Enzo Toriani	5, 7
	Gas Gas	808	(France) Jeremy Hauquier	5
Team Bonnaudin Racing	Kawasaki	821	(France) Julien Bonnaudin	1–2
737 Performance Gas Gas Oxmoto	Gas Gas	831	(France) Brice Maylin	All
	Honda	838	(France) Raphael Dauphinot	6–7
	Kawasaki	859	(France) Dany Vassel	1–2
KTM Metz	KTM	873	(France) Victor Krompholtz	5
Team Green MoTec	Kawasaki	875	(Switzerland) Kim Schaffter	1–2, 5
	Suzuki	886	(France) Paul Gautronet	4
	Fantic	889	(France) Francis Ortega	2
	Yamaha	898	(France) Alexis Laurent	2, 4
	Honda	904	(France) Pierrick Paget	6
	Yamaha	933	(Belgium) Ugo Moors	5
KTM Faktory	KTM	940	(France) Antoine Cossé	2
9MM Energy Drink BUD Racing	Kawasaki	945	(France) Anthony Bourdon	1–6
	Yamaha	986	(France) Damien Carcreff	3
Monster Energy Yamaha France Drag'On Tek	Yamaha	998	(United Kingdom) Todd Kellett	5
	Husqvarna	999	(France) Josselin Pecout	2

=== Riders Championship ===
Points are awarded to finishers of the main races, in the following format:

Position	1st	2nd	3rd	4th	5th	6th	7th	8th	9th	10th	11th	12th	13th	14th	15th	16th	17th	18th	19th	20th
Points	25	22	20	18	16	15	14	13	12	11	10	9	8	7	6	5	4	3	2	1

Pos	Rider	Bike	LAC (Occitania)		CAS (Occitania)		ROM (Brittany)		VES (Bourgogne-Franche-Comté)		BIT (Grand Est)		RAU (Normandy)		IFF (Brittany)		Points
1	(Switzerland) Valentin Guillod	Honda	3	4	4	3	2	5	4	1			1	8			273
2	(France) Stephen Rubini	Honda	6	Ret	1	2	9	3	2	2	4	3	2	5	1	2	261
3	(France) Xavier Boog	Yamaha	4	5	3	7	6	6	1	5	6	6	7	1	4	1	251
4	(France) Gregory Aranda	Yamaha	2	2	6	1	4	4	5	4	9	10	6	4	3	19	232
5	(France) Mathys Boisramé	Husqvarna	5	3	5	4	5	2	17	DNS			5	2	2	3	192
6	(France) Anthony Bourdon	Kawasaki	8	8	8	8	8	7	9	8	7	7	3	3			172
7	(France) Adrien Malaval	Yamaha	9	6	11	11	7	Ret	7	7	15	14	12	9	5	4	157
8	(France) Brice Maylin	Gas Gas	10	10	12	10	13	10	8	9	14	15	8	7	8	5	155
9	(France) Milko Potisek	Yamaha	Ret	DNS	7	5	3	8	3	6	2	1					145
10	(France) Jimmy Clochet	Honda	12	7	2	6	12	Ret	6	3	17	12					117
11	(France) Maxime Sot	Gas Gas	15	13	13	12	18	15	12	11	18	18	9	11	11	10	108
12	(Netherlands) Jeffrey Herlings	KTM	1	1			1	1									100
13	(France) Antonin Mille	Kawasaki	21	19	14	15	17	13	11	14	22	20	13	12	12	9	83
14	(Belgium) Cyril Genot	Honda									3	2	4	6			75
15	(France) David Herbreteau	KTM	7	9	10	9	10	9					DNS	DNS			72
16	(France) William Dho	Kawasaki	14	12	Ret	13	16	Ret	10	10	10	11					72
17	(France) Jason Clermont	Kawasaki					14	14					10	10	7	20	51
18	(France) Julien Pelletier	Yamaha	16	15			19	17					17	DNS	10	8	45
19	(Germany) Max Nagl	Honda									1	5					41
20	(France) Romain Pape	Kawasaki	13	11			11	11									38
21	(France) Raffael Blond	Husqvarna			17	DNS			14	13			11	14			36
22	(United Kingdom) Todd Kellett	Yamaha									5	4					34
23	(France) Enzo Toriani	Yamaha									19	Ret			6	6	32
24	(France) Vincent Corre	Honda					20	16							9	7	32
25	(France) Matéo Bouly	Kawasaki					22	18					19	13	13	11	31
26	(France) Dorian Werlé	KTM					24	19					14	15	14	12	31
27	(Netherlands) Lars van Berkel	Honda									8	8					26
28	(France) Tony Seignobos	KTM	17	Ret	18	17			13	15							25
29	(Switzerland) Kim Schaffter	Kawasaki	18	17	16	14					20	17					24
30	(Germany) Stefan Ekerold	Husqvarna									11	9					22
31	(France) Raphael Dauphinot	Honda											15	16	16	15	22
32	(France) Jeremy Hauquier	Gas Gas									13	13					16
33	(France) Charles Lefrançois	Honda					15	12									15
34	(France) Antoine Cossé	KTM			9	19											14
35	(France) Julien Cabioch	Kawasaki													15	13	14
36	(France) Josselin Cochennec	Honda													17	14	11
37	(France) Julien Bonnaudin	Kawasaki	Ret	16	15	Ret											11
38	(France) Hugo Roussaly	Yamaha	11	Ret													10
39	(France) Quentin Boudot	Kawasaki	22	20					15	18							10
40	(France) Valentin Madoulaud	Yamaha									16	16					10
41	(France) Benjamin Poissonnier	Honda							16	16							10
42	(France) Ludovic Macler	Honda									12	Ret					9
43	(France) Alexandre Lejeune	KTM							Ret	12							9
44	(France) Thomas Le Bihan	Yamaha													18	16	8
45	(France) Adrien Lamour	Honda	Ret	14									DNS	DNS			7
46	(France) Melvrick Eblin	Kawasaki			19	16											7
47	(France) Anthony Blanchet	Honda											18	17			7
48	(France) Alexis Laurent	Yamaha			DNS	DNS			18	17							7
49	(France) Pierrick Paget	Honda											16	DNS			5
50	(France) Jordan Robidou	Honda													20	17	5
51	(France) Victor Legeard	KTM													19	18	5
52	(France) Pierre Moine	Honda	19	18													5
53	(France) Josselin Pecout	Husqvarna			20	18											4
54	(France) Martin Dubois	Gas Gas	24	22					20	19	DNS	DNS					3
55	(Switzerland) Nicolas Bender	Husqvarna									21	19					2
56	(France) Paul Gautronet	Suzuki							19	Ret							2
57	(France) Nicolas Cottenet	Honda	20	Ret	21	20											2
58	(France) Mathis Anne	KTM											20	DNS			1
59	(France) Julien Roussel	Honda							21	20							1
60	(France) Loïs Carlier	Husqvarna					21	20									1
	(France) Shaun Vinel	Kawasaki	23	21													0
	(France) Tom Provost	Yamaha					25	21									0
	(France) Florent Becker	KTM									Ret	21					0
	(France) Victor Krompholtz	KTM									24	22					0
	(France) Damien Carcreff	Yamaha					27	22									0
	(France) Fabien Touffet	Honda					26	23									0
	(France) Alexandre Grondin	Yamaha					23	Ret									0
	(France) Gregory Gavard	Husqvarna									23	DNS					0
	(France) Dany Vassel	Kawasaki	DNS	DNS	Ret	DNS											0
	(France) Loic Rombaut	Yamaha									Ret	DNS					0
	(Belgium) Ugo Moors	Yamaha									Ret	DNS					0
	(France) Kevin Ballanger	Yamaha			DNS	DNS											0
	(France) Ludovic Bompar	KTM			DNS	DNS											0
	(France) Francis Ortega	Fantic			DNS	DNS											0
	(France) Mathéo Miot	Yamaha											DNS	DNS			0
	(France) Mathieu Letellier	KTM											DNS	DNS			0
	(France) Jimmy Auvray	Sherco											DNQ	DNQ			0
Pos	Rider	Bike	LAC (Occitania)		CAS (Occitania)		ROM (Brittany)		VES (Bourgogne-Franche-Comté)		BIT (Grand Est)		RAU (Normandy)		IFF (Brittany)		Points

== Elite MX2 ==
=== Participants ===
Team	Constructor	No	Rider	Rounds
Team OB1 Motorsport	Husqvarna	3	(France) Nicolas Aubin	1–3, 7
Team FR25 Honda	Honda	14	(France) Arnaud Aubin	1–4, 6
	Honda	17	(France) Paul Brunet	6
	KTM	22	(France) Mickaël Lamarque	1–2
	Husqvarna	24	(France) Paul Stauder	1
GT Racing KTM	KTM	34	(France) Bogdan Krajewski	All
	KTM	37	(France) Arthur Vial	2, 5
Nestaan Husqvarna Factory Racing	Husqvarna	39	(Netherlands) Roan van de Moosdijk	1
Nestaan Husqvarna Factory Racing	Husqvarna	93	(Belgium) Lucas Coenen	1
KTM Tech 32 Racing	KTM	57	(France) Pierre Goupillon	All
STS Stoker Racing	Fantic	61	(Belgium) Pako Destercq	1–2
Team New Bike Yamaha	Yamaha	72	(France) Lucas Imbert	1–5
Team New Bike Yamaha	Yamaha	527	(Belgium) Amandine Verstappen	3, 5
Team VRT KTM Veritise	KTM	73	(Italy) Ferruccio Zanchi	1
Team VRT KTM Veritise	KTM	282	(France) Marc-Antoine Rossi	1, 3, 6
	KTM	78	(France) Axel Louis	1
Red Bull KTM Factory Racing	KTM	79	(Belgium) Sacha Coenen	1
Team RID	Husqvarna	95	(France) Enzo Casat	1–2
	KTM	99	(France) Jimmy Grajwoda	1–3
Team VHR Racing	Gas Gas	100	(France) Scotty Verhaeghe	6
Team VHR Racing	Gas Gas	207	(France) Xavier Cazal	1–4, 6
	Yamaha	104	(France) Matis Mercieux	7
	Gas Gas	117	(France) Gaetan Pich	5
	Honda	122	(France) Julien Duhamel	1, 3, 6–7
Team Ship to Cycle Honda Motoblouz SR	Honda	125	(Finland) Emil Weckman	1–2, 4
Yamaha Motor France/Bud Racing	Yamaha	129	(France) Joey Nuques	1–2
Aldo MX Services	Yamaha	130	(France) Leo Lecuyer	6
	Yamaha	135	(France) Baptiste Ligier	4
Team GSM Dafy Michelin Yamaha	Yamaha	141	(France) Maxime Desprey	6
	KTM	151	(Sweden) Pontus Lindblad	2, 5
	Yamaha	179	(France) Enzo Siroutot	4
Team LB Racing	Kawasaki	194	(France) Florian Bertin	3, 6
Team LB Racing	KTM	606	(France) Killian Vincent	All
AGMX Racing	Honda	200	(Switzerland) Luca Diserens	1, 3
	Honda	202	(France) Corentin Normand	4
AG Motorsport Oxmoto	Gas Gas	205	(France) Evan Lhommedé	3
	KTM	211	(France) Kevin Vandeleene	2
	KTM	214	(France) Timothe Bellot	6
Bloody Harry Energy Drink RGS MX Team	Husqvarna	217	(Belgium) Junior Bal	5
Team Giorgio	Gas Gas	220	(France) Toni Giorgessi	4, 7
	Gas Gas	223	(France) Alexandre Viltard	6–7
	Honda	230	(France) Lucas Caron	7
AG Motorsport	Kawasaki	236	(France) Anthony Grosjean	4
	Gas Gas	241	(France) Nicolas Duhamel	3, 6–7
Yam Sand Racing	Yamaha	247	(France) Florian Miot	1–6
Yam Sand Racing	Yamaha	249	(France) Mathéo Miot	1–3, 5
	KTM	255	(France) Kevan Schillinger	1–3, 5
TRP Moto	KTM	258	(France) Ethan Franzoni	7
LF Motorsport	Yamaha	267	(France) Theo Anseur	1–6
Motoland Amiens	KTM	268	(France) Thibault Maupin	All
AC Motorsports	KTM	272	(France) Andreas Carrico	1, 3
Team JP Concept	Husqvarna	276	(France) Jeremy Bonneau	1–2
	KTM	286	(France) Axel Briand	1
JHR Racing	Honda	292	(France) Theo Aubanel	1
Couleurs Moto	Husqvarna	300	(France) Alex Poulain D'Andecy	All
Yamaha Motor France/LF Motorsport	Yamaha	301	(France) Noah Vampa	All
	KTM	316	(France) Guerlin Delarue	7
	KTM	318	(France) Tejy Krismann	1, 3, 6
9MM Energy Drink BUD Racing	Kawasaki	319	(France) Quentin Prugnières	1–3, 6–7
9MM Energy Drink BUD Racing	Kawasaki	339	(Chile) Benjamin Garib	1–2
Team CRC Motostyl	Husqvarna	324	(France) Maxime Charlier	1–3
Milwaukee Tools France	Husqvarna	335	(France) Enzo Polias	1–4
Rbike Motos	Kawasaki	343	(France) Yannis Blivet	1
Husqvarna BT Racing Team	Husqvarna	359	(France) Maxime Grau	6
Team MB2	Fantic	361	(France) Yann Borie	1
Team MB2	Fantic	636	(France) Damien Borie	1–2
	Honda	364	(France) Logan Huguenote	4
	Yamaha	367	(France) Karim Boukrouba-Le Meitour	3
	Honda	368	(Switzerland) Arthur Steffen	5
JSL 83 Kawasaki Toulon	Kawasaki	371	(France) Paolo Maschio	1, 3–4, 6–7
BenTech	Fantic	397	(France) Simon Depoers	5
KMP Honda Racing powered by Krettek	Honda	408	(Netherlands) Scott Smulders	5
KTM France	KTM	411	(France) Nicolas Dercourt	All
Yamaha Motor France Drag'On Tek	Yamaha	424	(France) Valentin Madoulaud	1–4
	Fantic	431	(France) Jeremy Joineau	2
	KTM	437	(France) Loïc Manteau	1
	Honda	439	(France) Tom Rajaonia	1–2
Yamaha Motor France/LF Motorsport	Yamaha	446	(France) Adrien Petit	All
	KTM	455	(France) Lucas Wautier	1, 6
	Gas Gas	456	(France) Jules Boucheron	6–7
	KTM	471	(France) Elwan van de Wouw	1–4, 6–7
	KTM	474	(France) Yannis Bleuze	6–7
	Fantic	483	(France) Kevin Deniset	4
	Kawasaki	485	(France) Alexis Schmitt	2, 4–5
	Fantic	495	(France) Laures Delamare	6
RC Motorsport Husqvarna	Husqvarna	496	(France) Romain Seranon	1–2, 4, 6–7
Espace 2 Roues 84	KTM	505	(France) Dorian Koch	1–2, 4
	KTM	507	(France) Luka Lecoq	7
	KTM	525	(France) Pierre-Louis Deroyer	3
	KTM	541	(France) Jules Lejeune	4
	Yamaha	566	(France) Killian Thetiot	3, 7
	Fantic	584	(France) Kévin Bouhelier	4
R2A Junior Team	KTM	597	(France) Alan Harnois	6–7
	Gas Gas	598	(New Caledonia) Ethan Lepigeon	1–2, 4, 6–7
	Fantic	619	(France) Hugo Stiennes	6
	Yamaha	638	(France) Mateo Chastel	7
	Gas Gas	642	(France) Jules Ammer	2, 5
	KTM	648	(France) Jules Almayrac	1–2
	Honda	652	(France) Arthur Clerc	5
	Gas Gas	701	(France) Martin Outrequin	6
Workshop 30	Husqvarna	712	(France) Pierrick Castan	1–2, 6–7
EHR Racing	Husqvarna	718	(South Africa) Calum Marriott	7
	KTM	744	(France) Saad Soulimani	1–6
Young Motion powered by Resa	Yamaha	744	(France) Saad Soulimani	7
C2 Sport	KTM	746	(France) Arthur Levallois	6
	Kawasaki	747	(France) Maximin Mille	2–7
Team TMX Competition	Yamaha	751	(France) Germain Jamet	All
Maison Chazal	Honda	766	(France) Jimmy Noirot	4
	Fantic	790	(France) Victor Mauresa	All
STT Racing	Yamaha	796	(France) Remy Anger	1, 3
Pro Factory Racing Team	Honda	798	(France) Arnaud Colson	1–4, 6–7
	Husqvarna	802	(France) Benjamin Gerber	1–2, 7
Team LMX Racing	Yamaha	810	(France) Yann Crnjanski	1–2, 5
	KTM	811	(France) Evan Guerry	3
	KTM	812	(France) Enzo Gregori Garrido	1–2
	Yamaha	820	(France) Louis Trelluyer	3, 7
Team Coquard 826	KTM	826	(France) Romain Coquard	4, 6
	KTM	840	(France) Léandre Chauviré	3
	KTM	887	(France) Matteo Robert	1, 5
	KTM	889	(France) Jules Gourribon	1
	KTM	895	(France) François Rigollot	6–7
Almax Motos	Gas Gas	923	(France) Michaël Bridier	3, 7
	Husqvarna	925	(France) Mathis Declemy	1–6
	Yamaha	934	(France) Marc Pardonnet	4
	Husqvarna	939	(France) Lucas Mas	1–2
	Yamaha	955	(France) Lilian Henry	1, 4–5
FB Factory Motorsport	Husqvarna	965	(France) Hugo Manzato	1–4
	Yamaha	971	(France) Tino Basso	1–2
	KTM	978	(France) Dorian Juin	6–7

=== Riders Championship ===
Points are awarded to finishers of the main races, in the following format:

Position	1st	2nd	3rd	4th	5th	6th	7th	8th	9th	10th	11th	12th	13th	14th	15th	16th	17th	18th	19th	20th
Points	25	22	20	18	16	15	14	13	12	11	10	9	8	7	6	5	4	3	2	1

Pos	Rider	Bike	LAC (Occitania)		CAS (Occitania)		ROM (Brittany)		VES (Bourgogne-Franche-Comté)		BIT (Grand Est)		RAU (Normandy)		IFF (Brittany)		Points
1	(France) Pierre Goupillon	KTM	3	2	1	2	1	2	1	1	1	1	3	4	16	1	304
2	(France) Bogdan Krajewski	KTM	15	12	2	3	12	DNS	7	8	2	3	12	12	6	6	183
3	(France) Nicolas Dercourt	KTM	20	10	Ret	7	13	6	5	3	9	6	4	5	4	4	182
4	(France) Saad Soulimani	KTM	7	8	9	8	4	4	Ret	DNS	3	4	18	13			177
4	(France) Saad Soulimani	Yamaha													3	3	177
5	(France) Quentin Prugnières	Kawasaki	Ret	3	3	1	DNQ	DNQ					2	2	1	2	156
6	(France) Adrien Petit	Yamaha	18	18	6	21	6	9	4	13	7	2	13	9	Ret	15	136
7	(France) Germain Jamet	Yamaha	Ret	13	20	10	Ret	12	3	4	12	10	8	Ret	5	7	130
8	(France) Lucas Imbert	Yamaha	8	9	19	27	5	3	6	5	10	7					119
9	(France) Florian Miot	Yamaha	12	Ret	7	6	DNS	DNS	11	6	4	9	1	Ret			118
10	(France) Marc-Antoine Rossi	KTM	4	7			2	1					5	3			115
11	(France) Maxime Charlier	Husqvarna	11	11	8	5	3	5									85
12	(France) Arnaud Colson	Honda	Ret	DNS	12	12	18	13	10	Ret			14	10	8	11	81
13	(Finland) Emil Weckman	Honda	Ret	DNS	4	4			2	2							80
14	(France) Arnaud Aubin	Honda	23	Ret	5	15	10	8	15	Ret			7	8			79
15	(France) Nicolas Aubin	Husqvarna	6	DNS	Ret	9	9	10							2	Ret	72
16	(France) Xavier Cazal	Gas Gas	14	15	Ret	DNS	7	7	12	9			11	Ret			72
17	(France) Thibault Maupin	KTM	19	22	Ret	Ret	8	Ret	9	7	Ret	Ret	10	14	Ret	9	71
18	(Belgium) Lucas Coenen	Husqvarna	1	1													50
19	(France) Alex Poulain D'Andecy	Husqvarna	29	23	DNQ	DNQ	Ret	21	14	11	15	Ret	17	Ret	9	10	50
20	(France) Noah Vampa	Yamaha	28	25	DNQ	DNQ	16	18	20	15	16	13	23	11	14	20	46
21	(France) Matheo Miot	Yamaha	10	16	Ret	Ret	DNS	DNS			6	8					44
22	(France) Maxime Desprey	Yamaha											6	1			40
23	(France) Hugo Manzato	Husqvarna	21	Ret	10	11	Ret	Ret	13	10							40
24	(Netherlands) Roan van de Moosdijk	Husqvarna	2	5													38
25	(France) Enzo Polias	Husqvarna	22	17	14	13	14	14	22	17							37
26	(France) Julien Duhamel	Honda	25	21			11	11					Ret	DNS	22	5	36
27	(Italy) Ferruccio Zanchi	KTM	5	4													34
28	(France) Nicolas Duhamel	Gas Gas					Ret	20					15	DNS	7	8	34
29	(Netherlands) Scott Smulders	Honda									5	5					32
30	(France) Alexis Schmitt	Kawasaki			11	14			16	16	20	17					32
31	(France) Toni Giorgessi	Gas Gas							17	12					11	13	31
32	(France) Maxime Grau	Husqvarna											9	6			27
33	(Chile) Benjamin Garib	Kawasaki	9	6	Ret	DNS											27
34	(France) Elwan van de Wouw	KTM	DNQ	DNQ	Ret	18	20	16	24	18			Ret	DNS	13	17	24
35	(France) Victor Mauresa	Fantic	DNQ	DNQ	17	16	24	22	26	22	23	15	21	15	25	18	24
36	(France) Alan Harnois	KTM											Ret	DNS	10	12	20
37	(France) Valentin Madoulaud	Yamaha	16	20	Ret	26	Ret	DNS	8	21							19
38	(France) Lilian Henry	Yamaha	DNQ	DNQ					19	20	14	12					19
39	(France) Killian Vincent	KTM	DNQ	DNQ	22	Ret	22	19	21	19	18	11	Ret	DNS	Ret	DNS	17
40	(France) Paolo Maschio	Kawasaki	DNQ	DNQ			21	Ret	18	25			26	17	12	21	16
41	(France) Yann Crnjanski	Yamaha	13	14	DNQ	DNQ					Ret	DNS					15
42	(France) Scotty Verhaeghe	Gas Gas											Ret	7			14
43	(France) Simon Depoers	Fantic									8	Ret					13
44	(France) Dorian Koch	KTM	DNQ	DNQ	15	25			25	14							13
45	(France) François Rigollot	KTM											16	18	18	22	11
46	(Belgium) Junior Bal	Husqvarna									11	21					10
47	(France) Tino Basso	Yamaha	26	19	13	22											10
48	(France) Tejy Krismann	KTM	24	Ret			17	15					Ret	DNS			10
49	(Switzerland) Luca Diserens	Honda	Ret	Ret			15	17									10
50	(New Caledonia) Ethan Lepigeon	Gas Gas	DNQ	DNQ	DNQ	DNQ			23	27			19	Ret	Ret	14	9
51	(France) Yannis Bleuze	KTM											25	DNS	17	16	9
52	(France) Mathis Declemy	Husqvarna	DNQ	DNQ	DNQ	DNQ	25	24	27	24	17	16	DNQ	DNQ			9
53	(France) Arthur Vial	KTM			Ret	24					13	Ret					8
54	(Sweden) Pontus Lindblad	KTM			23	Ret					21	14					7
55	(France) Dorian Juin	KTM											Ret	DNS	15	Ret	6
56	(France) Hugo Stiennes	Fantic											22	16			5
57	(France) Theo Anseur	Yamaha	DNQ	DNQ	16	23	30	30	32	23	Ret	DNS	DNQ	DNQ			5
58	(France) Jeremy Bonneau	Husqvarna	17	Ret	Ret	20											5
59	(France) Joey Nuques	Yamaha	DNQ	DNQ	21	17											4
60	(France) Jules Ammer	Gas Gas			DNQ	DNQ					22	18					3
61	(France) Damien Borie	Fantic	DNQ	DNQ	18	Ret											3
62	(France) Florian Bertin	Kawasaki					19	23					20	Ret			3
63	(France) Alexandre Viltard	Gas Gas											Ret	DNS	Ret	19	2
64	(France) Romain Seranon	Husqvarna	27	24	Ret	DNS			28	Ret			Ret	22	19	26	2
65	(France) Laures Delamare	Fantic											Ret	19			2
66	(France) Maximin Mille	Kawasaki			DNQ	DNQ	26	27	29	29	24	19	Ret	21	30	29	2
67	(Switzerland) Arthur Steffen	Honda									19	23					2
68	(France) Mickaël Lamarque	KTM	Ret	DNS	Ret	19											2
69	(France) Louis Trelluyer	Yamaha					27	28							20	24	1
70	(France) Pierrick Castan	Husqvarna	DNQ	DNQ	24	28							24	20	23	23	1
71	(Belgium) Amandine Verstappen	Yamaha					DNQ	DNQ			25	20					1
	(France) Guerlin Delarue	KTM													21	Ret	0
	(France) Gaetan Pich	Gas Gas									26	22					0
	(France) Remy Anger	Yamaha	DNQ	DNQ			23	26									0
	(France) Benjamin Gerber	Husqvarna	DNQ	DNQ	DNQ	DNQ									24	27	0
	(France) Kevan Schillinger	KTM	DNQ	DNQ	DNQ	DNQ	DNQ	DNQ			Ret	24					0
	(France) Evan Lhommedé	Gas Gas					28	25									0
	(France) Mateo Chastel	Yamaha													Ret	25	0
	(South Africa) Calum Marriott	Husqvarna													26	28	0
	(France) Jules Lejeune	KTM							30	26							0
	(France) Ethan Franzoni	KTM													27	Ret	0
	(France) Arthur Clerc	Honda									27	DNS					0
	(France) Anthony Grosjean	Kawasaki							31	28							0
	(France) Matis Mercieux	Yamaha													28	Ret	0
	(France) Pierre-Louis Deroyer	KTM					32	29									0
	(France) Lucas Caron	Honda													29	Ret	0
	(France) Andreas Carrico	KTM	DNQ	DNQ			29	DNS									0
	(France) Michaël Bridier	Gas Gas					DNQ	DNQ							31	30	0
	(France) Corentin Normand	Honda							36	30							0
	(France) Léandre Chauviré	KTM					31	31									0
	(France) Romain Coquard	KTM							34	31			Ret	DNS			0
	(France) Luka Lecoq	KTM													Ret	31	0
	(France) Killian Thetiot	Yamaha					DNQ	DNQ							32	Ret	0
	(France) Kévin Bouhelier	Fantic							Ret	32							0
	(France) Jimmy Noirot	Honda							33	33							0
	(France) Kevin Deniset	Fantic							35	Ret							0
	(France) Enzo Gregori Garrido	KTM	Ret	Ret	Ret	Ret											0
	(Belgium) Pako Destercq	Fantic	Ret	Ret	Ret	DNS											0
	(France) Jules Almayrac	KTM	DNQ	DNQ	Ret	Ret											0
	(France) Jules Gourribon	KTM	Ret	Ret													0
	(France) Enzo Siroutot	Yamaha							Ret	Ret							0
	(France) Jules Boucheron	Gas Gas											Ret	DNS	Ret	DNS	0
	(France) Jimmy Grajwoda	KTM	DNQ	DNQ	DNQ	DNQ	Ret	DNS									0
	(France) Matteo Robert	KTM	DNQ	DNQ							Ret	DNS					0
	(Belgium) Sacha Coenen	KTM	Ret	DNS													0
	(France) Axel Louis	KTM	Ret	DNS													0
	(France) Jeremy Joineau	Fantic			Ret	DNS											0
	(France) Baptiste Ligier	Yamaha							Ret	DNS							0
	(France) Timothe Bellot	KTM											Ret	DNS			0
	(France) Enzo Casat	Husqvarna	DNQ	DNQ	DNQ	DNQ											0
	(France) Tom Rajaonia	Honda	DNQ	DNQ	DNQ	DNQ											0
	(France) Lucas Mas	Husqvarna	DNQ	DNQ	DNQ	DNQ											0
	(France) Lucas Wautier	KTM	DNQ	DNQ									DNQ	DNQ			0
	(France) Theo Aubanel	Honda	DNQ	DNQ													0
	(France) Loïc Manteau	KTM	DNQ	DNQ													0
	(France) Paul Stauder	Husqvarna	DNQ	DNQ													0
	(France) Axel Briand	KTM	DNQ	DNQ													0
	(France) Yann Borie	Fantic	DNQ	DNQ													0
	(France) Yannis Blivet	Kawasaki	DNQ	DNQ													0
	(France) Kevin Vandeleene	KTM			DNQ	DNQ											0
	(France) Evan Guerry	KTM					DNQ	DNQ									0
	(France) Karim Boukrouba-Le Meitour	Yamaha					DNQ	DNQ									0
	(France) Marc Pardonnet	Yamaha							DNQ	DNQ							0
	(France) Logan Huguenote	Honda							DNQ	DNQ							0
	(France) Martin Outrequin	Gas Gas											DNQ	DNQ			0
	(France) Arthur Levallois	KTM											DNQ	DNQ			0
	(France) Paul Brunet	Honda											DNQ	DNQ			0
	(France) Leo Lecuyer	Yamaha											DNQ	DNQ			0
Pos	Rider	Bike	LAC (Occitania)		CAS (Occitania)		ROM (Brittany)		VES (Bourgogne-Franche-Comté)		BIT (Grand Est)		RAU (Normandy)		IFF (Brittany)		Points
