= Saint-Marc-sur-Couesnon =

Saint-Marc-sur-Couesnon Sant-Marzh-ar-C'houenon
- Part of Rives-du-Couesnon
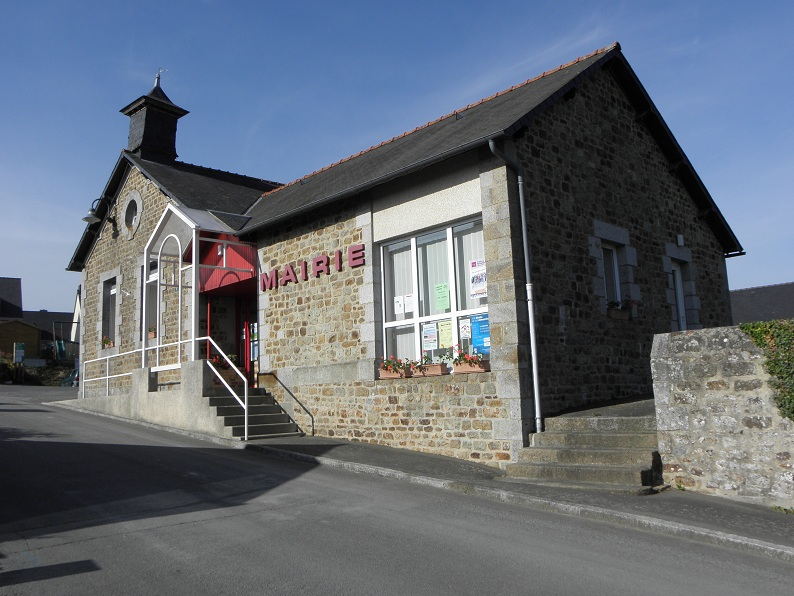
- The town hall of Saint-Marc-sur-Couesnon

- Coat of arms
- Location of Saint-Marc-sur-Couesnon
- Location within France Location within Brittany
- Coordinates: 48°18′16″N 1°21′51″W
- Country: France
- Region: Brittany
- Department: Ille-et-Vilaine
- Arrondissement: Fougères-Vitré
- Canton: Fougères-1
- Commune: Rives-du-Couesnon
- Area^{1}: 12.05 km^{2} (4.65 sq mi)
- Highest elevation: 117 m (384 ft)
- Lowest elevation: 42 m (138 ft)
- Population (2023): 552
  - Density: 45.8/km^{2} (119/sq mi)
- Time zone: UTC+01:00 (CET)
  - Summer (DST): UTC+02:00 (CEST)
- Postal code: 35140
- ^{1} French Land Register data, which excludes lakes, ponds, glaciers > 1 km^{2} (0.386 sq mi or 247 acres) and river estuaries.

Saint-Marc-sur-Couesnon (French pronunciation: [sɛ̃ maʁk syʁ kwenɔ̃], literally Saint-Marc on Couesnon; Breton: Sant-Marzh-ar-C'houenon) is a former commune in the Ille-et-Vilaine department in Brittany in northwestern France. On 1 January 2019, it was merged into the new commune Rives-du-Couesnon. Inhabitants of Saint-Marc-sur-Couesnon are called médardais in French.

== Geography ==
Saint-Marc-sur-Couesnon is located 35 km (22 mi) northeast of Rennes and 43 km (27 mi) south of Mont Saint-Michel.

The neighboring communes are Saint-Hilaire-des-Landes, Saint-Sauveur-des-Landes, La Chapelle-Saint-Aubert, Saint-Jean-sur-Couesnon, Mézières-sur-Couesnon, and Saint-Ouen-des-Alleux.

== See also ==
- Communes of the Ille-et-Vilaine department
