= La Chapelle-Saint-Aubert =

La Chapelle-Saint-Aubert La Chapèll-Saent-Aubèrt (Gallo) Chapel-Sant-Alverzh (Breton)
- Commune
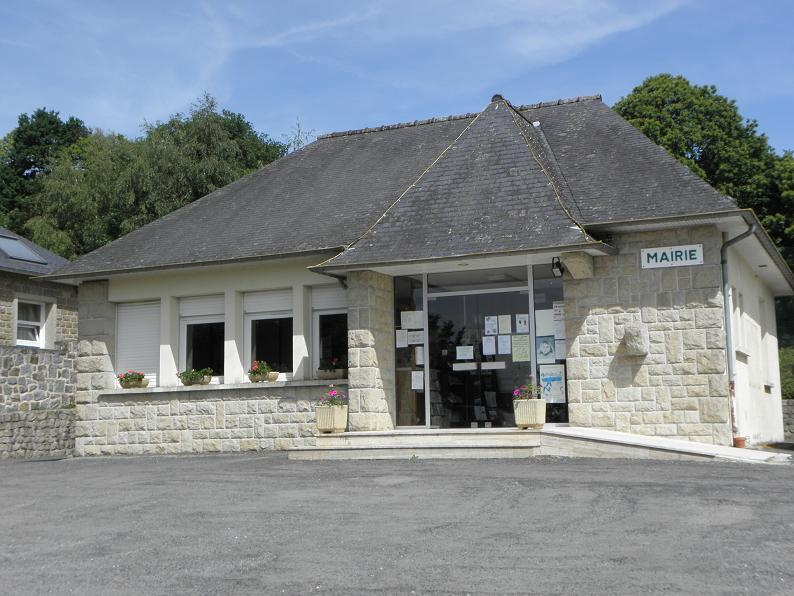
- Town hall
- Location of La Chapelle-Saint-Aubert
- Location within France Location within Brittany
- Coordinates: 48°18′52″N 1°18′23″W
- Country: France
- Region: Brittany
- Department: Ille-et-Vilaine
- Arrondissement: Fougères-Vitré
- Canton: Fougères-1
- Intercommunality: Fougères Agglomération

Government
  - Mayor (2020–2026): Christian Galle
- Area^{1}: 9.77 km^{2} (3.77 sq mi)
- Highest elevation: 128 m (420 ft)
- Lowest elevation: 51 m (167 ft)
- Population (2023): 479
  - Density: 49.0/km^{2} (127/sq mi)
- Time zone: UTC+01:00 (CET)
  - Summer (DST): UTC+02:00 (CEST)
- INSEE/Postal code: 35063 /35140
- ^{1} French Land Register data, which excludes lakes, ponds, glaciers > 1 km^{2} (0.386 sq mi or 247 acres) and river estuaries.

La Chapelle-Saint-Aubert (French pronunciation: [la ʃapɛl sɛ̃.t‿obɛʁ]; Gallo: La Chapèll-Saent-Aubèrt, Breton: Chapel-Sant-Alverzh) is a commune in the Ille-et-Vilaine department in Brittany in northwestern France.

== Geography ==
La Chapelle-Saint-Aubert is located at 39 km (24 mi) in the North-East of Rennes and at 43 km (27 mi) in the south of the Mont Saint-Michel.

The communes bordering are Saint-Sauveur-des-Landes, Romagné, Billé, Vendel, Saint-Jean-sur-Couesnon and Saint-Marc-sur-Couesnon.

== Population ==
Historical population
Year	Pop.	±% p.a.
1968	399	—
1975	352	−1.77%
1982	377	+0.99%
1990	387	+0.33%
1999	359	−0.83%
2007	405	+1.52%
2012	424	+0.92%
2017	439	+0.70%
2023	479	+1.46%
Source: INSEE

== See also ==
- Communes of the Ille-et-Vilaine department
