= Rives-du-Couesnon =

Rives-du-Couesnon Glannoù-ar-C'houenon (Breton)
- Commune
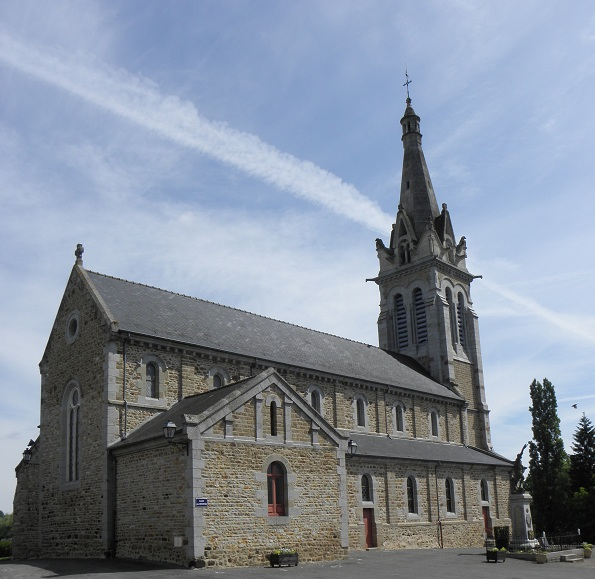
- The church of Saint-Jean-Baptiste, in Saint-Jean-sur-Couesnon
- Location of Rives-du-Couesnon
- Location within France Location within Brittany
- Coordinates: 48°17′29″N 1°21′57″W
- Country: France
- Region: Brittany
- Department: Ille-et-Vilaine
- Arrondissement: Fougères-Vitré
- Canton: Fougères-1
- Intercommunality: Fougères Agglomération

Government
  - Mayor (2020–2026): David Lebouvier
- Area^{1}: 48.36 km^{2} (18.67 sq mi)
- Highest elevation: 122 m (400 ft)
- Lowest elevation: 42 m (138 ft)
- Population (2023): 2,927
  - Density: 60.53/km^{2} (156.8/sq mi)
- Time zone: UTC+01:00 (CET)
  - Summer (DST): UTC+02:00 (CEST)
- INSEE/Postal code: 35282 /35140
- ^{1} French Land Register data, which excludes lakes, ponds, glaciers > 1 km^{2} (0.386 sq mi or 247 acres) and river estuaries.

Rives-du-Couesnon (French pronunciation: [ʁiv dy kwenɔ̃], literally Banks of the Couesnon; Breton: Glannoù-ar-C'houenon) is a commune in the Ille-et-Vilaine department in Brittany in northwestern France. It was established on 1 January 2019 by merger of the former communes of Saint-Jean-sur-Couesnon (the seat), Saint-Georges-de-Chesné, Saint-Marc-sur-Couesnon and Vendel.

== Population ==
Population data refer to the commune in its geography as of January 2025.

Historical population
Year	Pop.	±% p.a.
1968	2,038	—
1975	1,826	−1.56%
1982	1,807	−0.15%
1990	1,838	+0.21%
1999	1,998	+0.93%
2007	2,453	+2.60%
2012	2,708	+2.00%
2017	2,858	+1.08%
2023	2,927	+0.40%
Source: INSEE

== See also ==
- Communes of the Ille-et-Vilaine department
