= Saint-Jean-sur-Couesnon =

Saint-Jean-sur-Couesnon Sant-Yann-ar-C'houenon
- Part of Rives-du-Couesnon
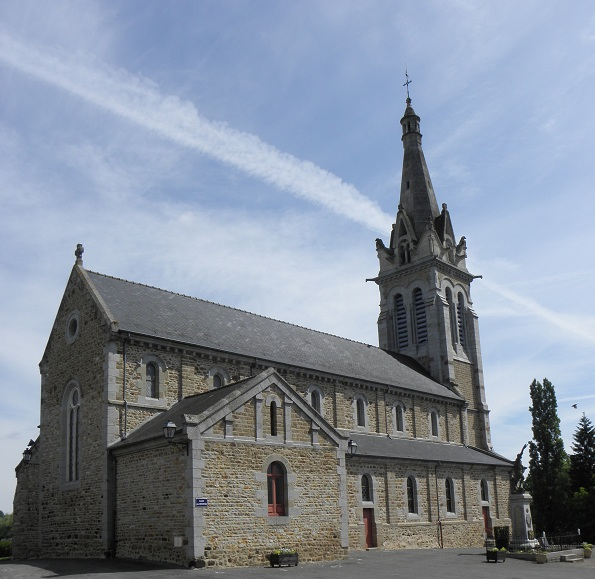
- The church of Saint-Jean-Baptiste, in Saint-Jean-sur-Couesnon
- Location of Saint-Jean-sur-Couesnon
- Location within France Location within Brittany
- Coordinates: 48°17′29″N 1°21′57″W
- Country: France
- Region: Brittany
- Department: Ille-et-Vilaine
- Arrondissement: Fougères-Vitré
- Canton: Fougères-1
- Commune: Rives-du-Couesnon
- Area^{1}: 18.32 km^{2} (7.07 sq mi)
- Highest elevation: 122 m (400 ft)
- Lowest elevation: 47 m (154 ft)
- Population (2022): 1,279
  - Density: 69.81/km^{2} (180.8/sq mi)
- Time zone: UTC+01:00 (CET)
  - Summer (DST): UTC+02:00 (CEST)
- Postal code: 35140
- ^{1} French Land Register data, which excludes lakes, ponds, glaciers > 1 km^{2} (0.386 sq mi or 247 acres) and river estuaries.

Saint-Jean-sur-Couesnon (French pronunciation: [sɛ̃ ʒɑ̃ syʁ kwenɔ̃], literally Saint-Jean on Couesnon; Breton: Sant-Yann-ar-C'houenon) is a former commune in the Ille-et-Vilaine department in Brittany in northwestern France. On 1 January 2019, it was merged into the new commune Rives-du-Couesnon.

== Geography ==
Saint-Jean-sur-Couesnon is located 33 km (21 mi) northeast of Rennes and 45 km (28 mi) south of Mont Saint-Michel.

The neighboring communes are Saint-Marc-sur-Couesnon, La Chapelle-Saint-Aubert, Vendel, Saint-Georges-de-Chesné, Saint-Aubin-du-Cormier, and Mézières-sur-Couesnon.

== Population ==
Historical population
Year	Pop.	±% p.a.
1962	895	—
1968	826	−1.33%
1975	745	−1.46%
1982	729	−0.31%
1990	729	+0.00%
1999	863	+1.89%
2006	987	+1.94%
2022	1,279	+1.63%
Source: EHESS and INSEE

== See also ==
- Communes of the Ille-et-Vilaine department
