= Vendel, Ille-et-Vilaine =

Vendel Gwennel
- Part of Rives-du-Couesnon
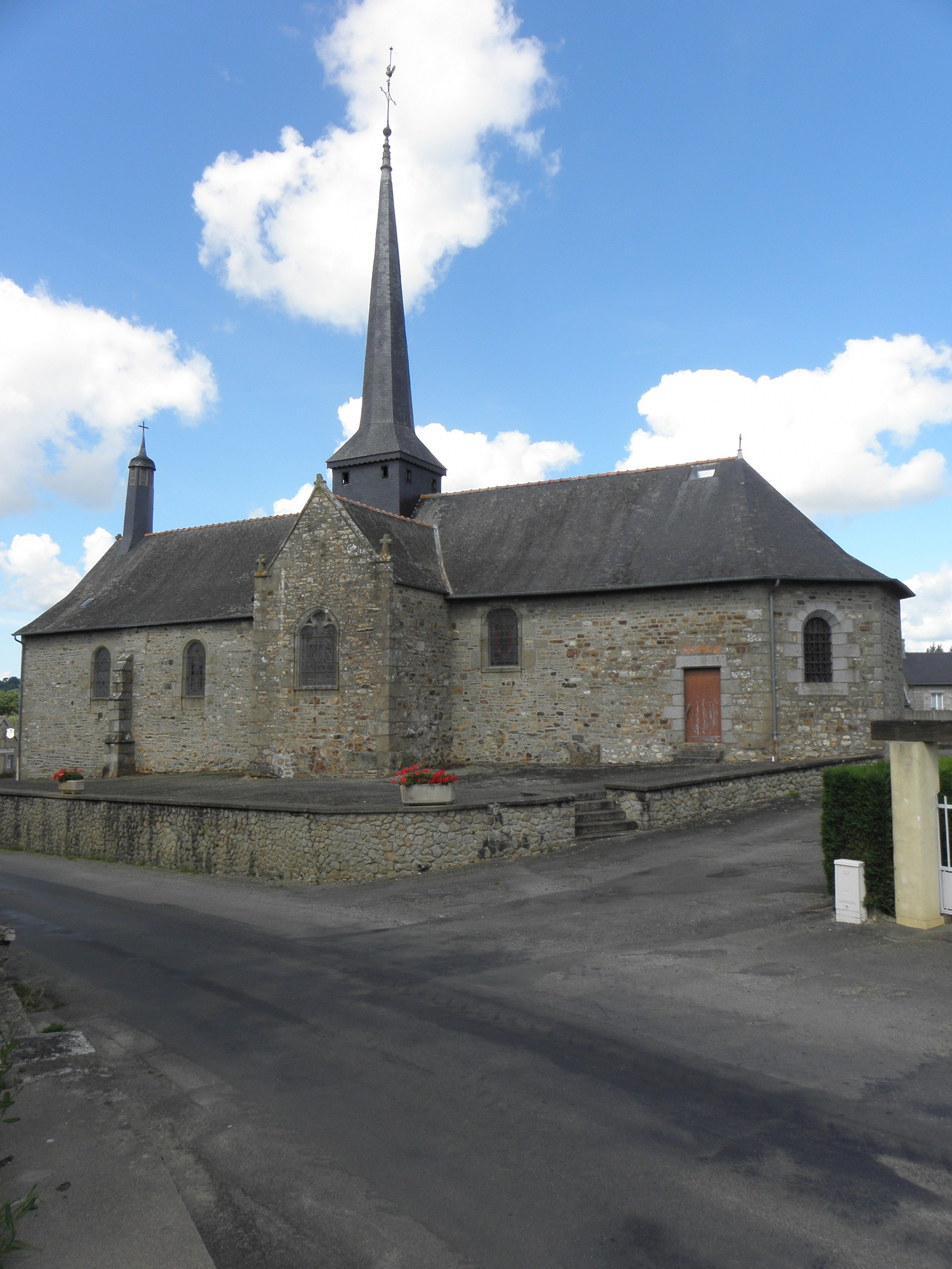
- The church in Vendel

- Coat of arms
- Location of Vendel
- Location within France Location within Brittany
- Coordinates: 48°18′00″N 1°18′37″W
- Country: France
- Region: Brittany
- Department: Ille-et-Vilaine
- Arrondissement: Fougères-Vitré
- Canton: Fougères-1
- Commune: Rives-du-Couesnon
- Area^{1}: 6.37 km^{2} (2.46 sq mi)
- Highest elevation: 105 m (344 ft)
- Lowest elevation: 50 m (160 ft)
- Population (2023): 389
  - Density: 61.1/km^{2} (158/sq mi)
- Time zone: UTC+01:00 (CET)
  - Summer (DST): UTC+02:00 (CEST)
- Postal code: 35140
- ^{1} French Land Register data, which excludes lakes, ponds, glaciers > 1 km^{2} (0.386 sq mi or 247 acres) and river estuaries.

Vendel (French pronunciation: [vɑ̃dɛl]; Breton: Gwennel; Gallo: Vandèu) is a former commune in the Ille-et-Vilaine department in Brittany in northwestern France. On 1 January 2019, it was merged into the new commune Rives-du-Couesnon. Inhabitants of Vendel are called Vendelais in French.

== Geography ==
Vendel is located 38 km (24 mi) northeast of Rennes and 45 km (28 mi) south of Mont Saint-Michel.

The adjacent communes are La Chapelle-Saint-Aubert, Billé, Saint-Georges-de-Chesné, and Saint-Jean-sur-Couesnon.

== See also ==
- Communes of the Ille-et-Vilaine department
