= Mézières-sur-Couesnon =

Mézières-sur-Couesnon Maézierr (Gallo) Magoerioù-ar-C'houenon (Breton)
- Commune
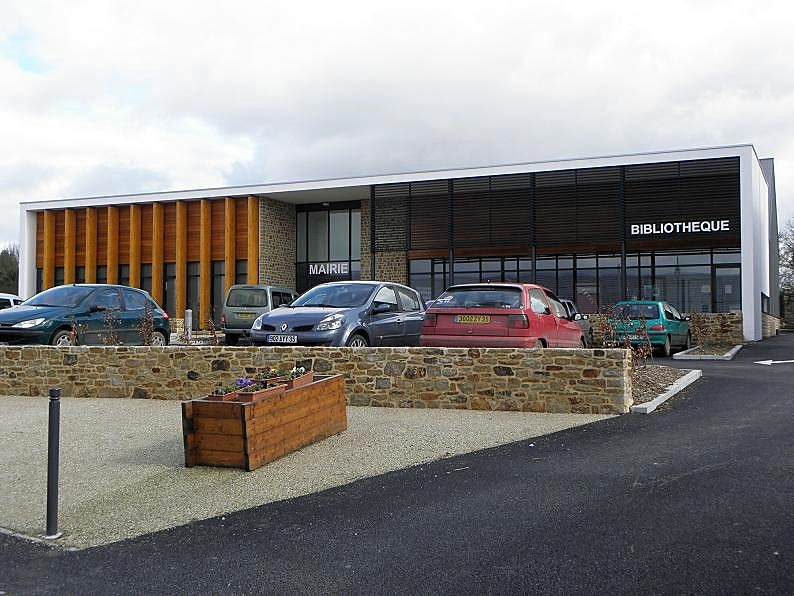
- The town hall and library of Mézières-sur-Couesnon
- Location of Mézières-sur-Couesnon
- Location within France Location within Brittany
- Coordinates: 48°17′47″N 1°25′54″W
- Country: France
- Region: Brittany
- Department: Ille-et-Vilaine
- Arrondissement: Rennes
- Canton: Fougères-1

Government
  - Mayor (2020–2026): Olivier Barbette
- Area^{1}: 24.74 km^{2} (9.55 sq mi)
- Elevation: 90 m (300 ft)
- Highest elevation: 121 m (397 ft)
- Lowest elevation: 35 m (115 ft)
- Population (2023): 1,734
  - Density: 70.09/km^{2} (181.5/sq mi)
- Time zone: UTC+01:00 (CET)
  - Summer (DST): UTC+02:00 (CEST)
- INSEE/Postal code: 35178 /35140
- ^{1} French Land Register data, which excludes lakes, ponds, glaciers > 1 km^{2} (0.386 sq mi or 247 acres) and river estuaries.

Mézières-sur-Couesnon (French pronunciation: [mezjɛʁ syʁ kwenɔ̃], literally Mézières on Couesnon; Breton: Magoerioù-ar-C'houenon; Gallo: Maézierr) is a commune in the Ille-et-Vilaine department in Brittany in northwestern France.

== Geography ==
Mézières-sur-Couesnon is located 30 km (19 mi) northeast of Rennes and 42 km (26 mi) south of Mont Saint-Michel. As its name indicates, it is situated on the Couesnon River.

The bordering communes are Saint-Ouen-des-Alleux, Saint-Marc-sur-Couesnon, Saint-Jean-sur-Couesnon, Saint-Aubin-du-Cormier, Gahard, and Vieux-Vy-sur-Couesnon.

== Population ==
Inhabitants of Mézières-sur-Couesnon are called Mézièrais in French.

Historical population
Year	Pop.	±% p.a.
1968	962	—
1975	881	−1.25%
1982	816	−1.09%
1990	807	−0.14%
1999	822	+0.20%
2007	1,187	+4.70%
2012	1,551	+5.50%
2017	1,752	+2.47%
2023	1,734	−0.17%
Source: INSEE

== See also ==
- Communes of the Ille-et-Vilaine department
