= Saint-Aubin-du-Cormier =

Saint-Aubin-du-Cormier Grand'Saent Aubin (Gallo) Sant-Albin-an-Hiliber (Breton)
- Commune
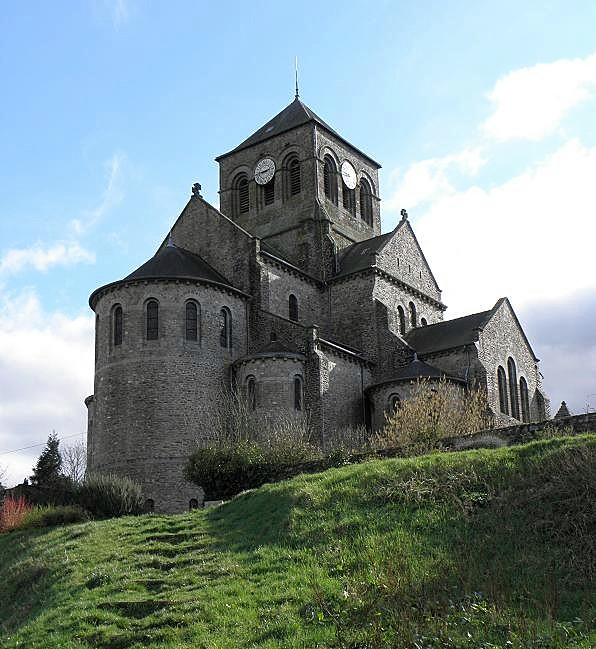
- The church of Saint-Aubin, in Saint-Aubin-du-Cormier

- Coat of arms
- Location of Saint-Aubin-du-Cormier
- Location within France Location within Brittany
- Coordinates: 48°15′37″N 1°23′51″W
- Country: France
- Region: Brittany
- Department: Ille-et-Vilaine
- Arrondissement: Rennes
- Canton: Fougères-1

Government
  - Mayor (2020–2026): Jérôme Bégasse
- Area^{1}: 27.41 km^{2} (10.58 sq mi)
- Elevation: 117 m (384 ft)
- Highest elevation: 123 m (404 ft)
- Lowest elevation: 54 m (177 ft)
- Population (2023): 4,203
  - Density: 153.3/km^{2} (397.1/sq mi)
- Time zone: UTC+01:00 (CET)
  - Summer (DST): UTC+02:00 (CEST)
- INSEE/Postal code: 35253 /35140
- ^{1} French Land Register data, which excludes lakes, ponds, glaciers > 1 km^{2} (0.386 sq mi or 247 acres) and river estuaries.

Saint-Aubin-du-Cormier (French pronunciation: [sɛ̃.t‿obɛ̃ dy kɔʁmje]; Gallo: Grand'Saent Aubin, Breton: Sant-Albin-an-Hiliber) is a commune in the Ille-et-Vilaine department in Brittany in northwestern France.

== Geography ==
Saint-Aubin-du-Cormier is located at 29 km (18 mi) northeast of Rennes and 49 km (30 mi) south of Mont Saint-Michel.

The bordering communes are Mézières-sur-Couesnon, Saint-Jean-sur-Couesnon, Saint-Georges-de-Chesné, Mecé, Livré-sur-Changeon, Liffré, Gosné, Ercé-près-Liffré, and Gahard.

== History ==
The area is most notable for the 1488 Battle of Saint-Aubin-du-Cormier, the decisive conflict of the guerre folle between the Duke of Brittany, at the time still independent, and the French king. The Duke Of Brittany Francois II was openly pro England and sought to resist the King of France’s repeated attempts to put an end to Brittany’s independence. Brittany’s forces were defeated, paving the way for the subsequent integration of Brittany into the French kingdom (through the forced marriage of Duchess Anne to the king of France).

The area was also the site of conflict during the Chouannerie, anti-Revolutionary insurrections in the 1790s.

== Population ==
Inhabitants of Saint-Aubin-du-Cormier are called saint-aubinais in French.

Historical population
| Year | Pop. | ±% p.a. |
|---|---|---|
| 1968 | 1,714 | — |
| 1975 | 1,776 | +0.51% |
| 1982 | 2,235 | +3.34% |
| 1990 | 2,040 | −1.13% |
| 1999 | 2,746 | +3.36% |
| 2007 | 3,608 | +3.47% |
| 2012 | 3,570 | −0.21% |
| 2017 | 3,837 | +1.45% |
| 2023 | 4,203 | +1.53% |
Source: INSEE

== See also ==
- Communes of the Ille-et-Vilaine department
