= Parcé =

Parcé Parczaé (Gallo) Parzieg (Breton)
- Commune
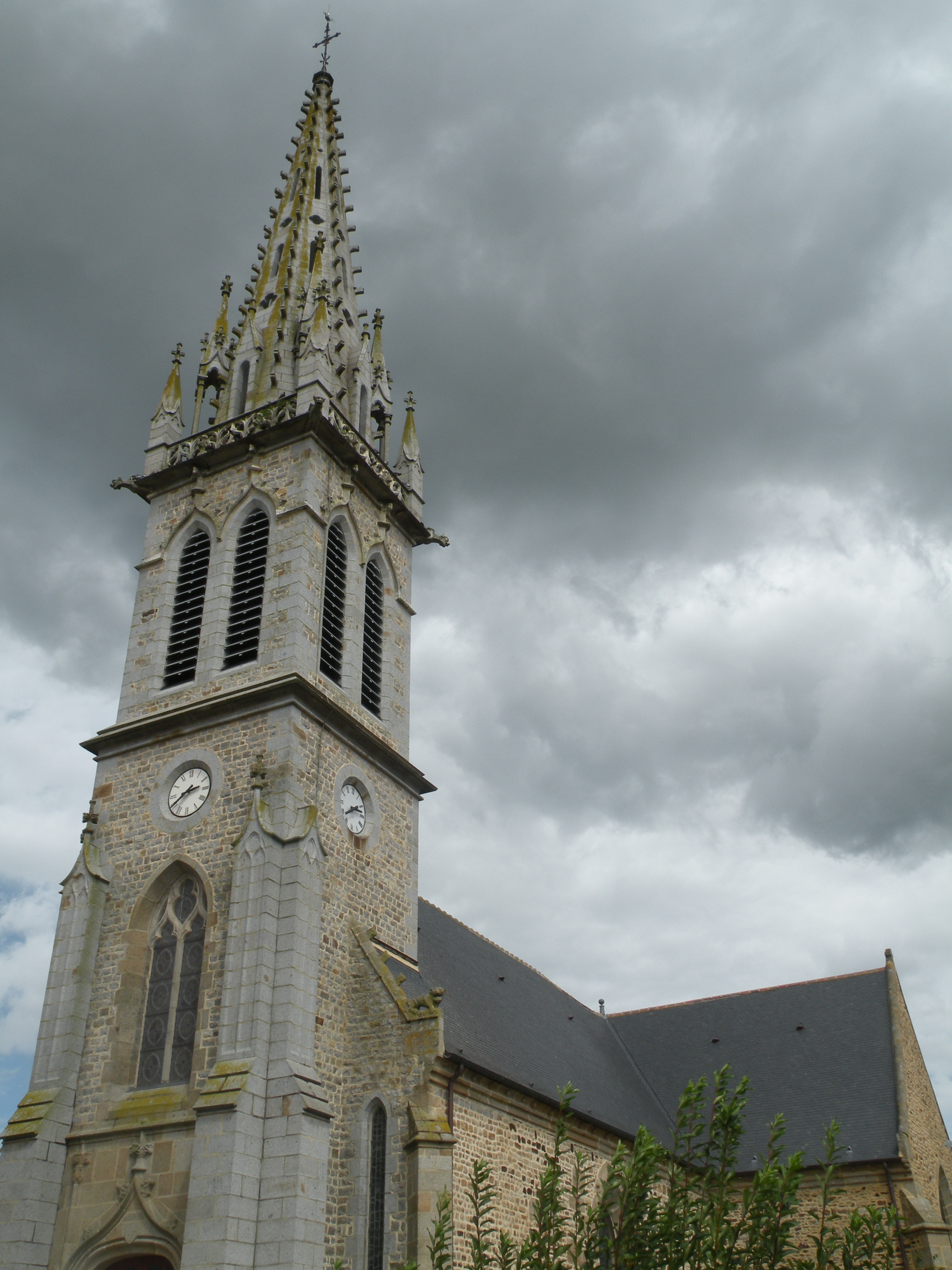
- The church of Saint-Pierre
- Location of Parcé
- Location within France Location within Brittany
- Coordinates: 48°16′26″N 1°11′57″W
- Country: France
- Region: Brittany
- Department: Ille-et-Vilaine
- Arrondissement: Fougères-Vitré
- Canton: Fougères-1
- Intercommunality: Fougères Agglomération

Government
  - Mayor (2020–2026): Laurent Legendre
- Area^{1}: 16.88 km^{2} (6.52 sq mi)
- Highest elevation: 166 m (545 ft)
- Lowest elevation: 73 m (240 ft)
- Population (2023): 657
  - Density: 38.9/km^{2} (101/sq mi)
- Time zone: UTC+01:00 (CET)
  - Summer (DST): UTC+02:00 (CEST)
- INSEE/Postal code: 35214 /35210
- ^{1} French Land Register data, which excludes lakes, ponds, glaciers > 1 km^{2} (0.386 sq mi or 247 acres) and river estuaries.

Parcé (French pronunciation: [paʁse]; Breton: Parzieg; Gallo: Parczaé) is a commune in the Ille-et-Vilaine department of Brittany in northwestern France.

== Population ==
Inhabitants of Parcé are called Parcéens in French.

Historical population
Year	Pop.	±% p.a.
1968	622	—
1975	568	−1.29%
1982	546	−0.56%
1990	562	+0.36%
1999	602	+0.77%
2007	641	+0.79%
2012	643	+0.06%
2017	650	+0.22%
2023	657	+0.18%
Source: INSEE

== See also ==
- Communes of the Ille-et-Vilaine department
