= Lécousse =

Lécousse Eskuz (Breton)
- Commune
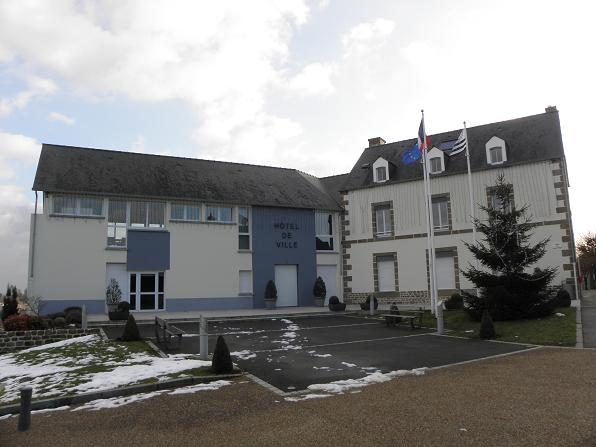
- Town hall

- Coat of arms
- Location of Lécousse
- Location within France Location within Brittany
- Coordinates: 48°22′06″N 1°12′58″W
- Country: France
- Region: Brittany
- Department: Ille-et-Vilaine
- Arrondissement: Fougères-Vitré
- Canton: Fougères-1
- Intercommunality: Fougères Agglomération

Government
  - Mayor (2020–2026): Anne Perrin
- Area^{1}: 11.06 km^{2} (4.27 sq mi)
- Highest elevation: 181 m (594 ft)
- Lowest elevation: 62 m (203 ft)
- Population (2023): 3,530
  - Density: 319/km^{2} (827/sq mi)
- Time zone: UTC+01:00 (CET)
  - Summer (DST): UTC+02:00 (CEST)
- INSEE/Postal code: 35150 /35133
- ^{1} French Land Register data, which excludes lakes, ponds, glaciers > 1 km^{2} (0.386 sq mi or 247 acres) and river estuaries.

Lécousse (French pronunciation: [lekus]; Breton: Eskuz) is a commune in the Ille-et-Vilaine department of Brittany in north-western France.

== Population ==
Inhabitants of Lécousse are called in French lecoussais.

Historical population
Year	Pop.	±% p.a.
1968	1,129	—
1975	1,347	+2.55%
1982	2,472	+9.06%
1990	2,827	+1.69%
1999	2,826	−0.00%
2007	2,914	+0.38%
2012	2,987	+0.50%
2017	3,233	+1.60%
2023	3,530	+1.48%
Source: INSEE

== See also ==
- Communes of the Ille-et-Vilaine department
