= Gosné =

Gosné Gosnae (Gallo) Goneg (Breton)
- Commune
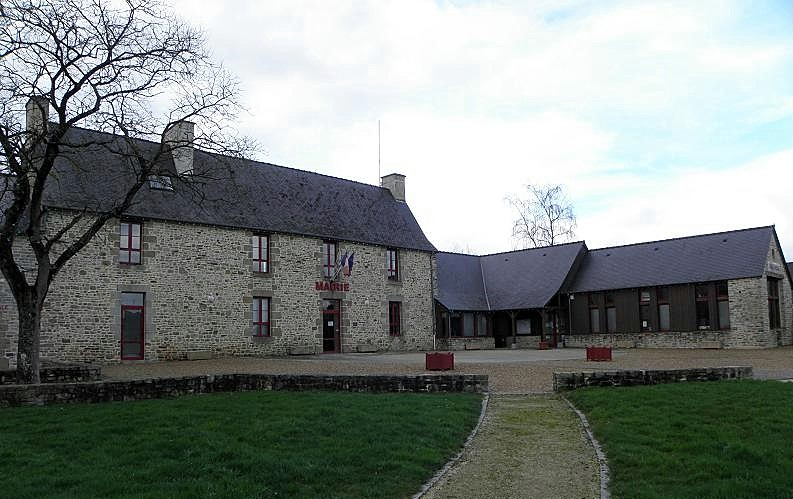
- Town hall
- Location of Gosné
- Location within France Location within Brittany
- Coordinates: 48°14′49″N 1°27′49″W
- Country: France
- Region: Brittany
- Department: Ille-et-Vilaine
- Arrondissement: Rennes
- Canton: Fougères-1
- Intercommunality: Liffré-Cormier Communauté

Government
  - Mayor (2020–2026): Jean Dupire
- Area^{1}: 18.14 km^{2} (7.00 sq mi)
- Highest elevation: 114 m (374 ft)
- Lowest elevation: 53 m (174 ft)
- Population (2023): 2,145
  - Density: 118.2/km^{2} (306.3/sq mi)
- Time zone: UTC+01:00 (CET)
  - Summer (DST): UTC+02:00 (CEST)
- INSEE/Postal code: 35121 /35140
- ^{1} French Land Register data, which excludes lakes, ponds, glaciers > 1 km^{2} (0.386 sq mi or 247 acres) and river estuaries.

Gosné (French pronunciation: [ɡone]; Breton: Goneg; Gallo: Gosnae) is a commune in the Ille-et-Vilaine department in Brittany in northwestern France.

== International relations ==
It is twinned with Ballyheigue in County Kerry, Ireland.

== Population ==
Inhabitants of Gosné are called Gosnéens in French.

Historical population

Year	Pop.	±% p.a.
1793	976	—
1800	886	−1.37%
1806	906	+0.37%
1821	976	+0.50%
1831	1,025	+0.49%
1836	1,025	+0.00%
1841	1,002	−0.45%
1846	1,101	+1.90%
1851	1,197	+1.69%
1856	1,237	+0.66%
1861	1,257	+0.32%
1866	1,297	+0.63%
1872	1,270	−0.35%
1876	1,225	−0.90%
1881	1,198	−0.44%
1886	1,221	+0.38%
1891	1,213	−0.13%
1896	1,161	−0.87%
1901	1,178	+0.29%

Year	Pop.	±% p.a.
1906	1,203	+0.42%
1911	1,176	−0.45%
1921	1,033	−1.29%
1926	1,017	−0.31%
1931	986	−0.62%
1936	950	−0.74%
1946	949	−0.01%
1954	935	−0.19%
1962	918	−0.23%
1968	817	−1.92%
1975	875	+0.98%
1982	1,014	+2.13%
1990	1,195	+2.07%
1999	1,380	+1.61%
2007	1,622	+2.04%
2012	1,851	+2.68%
2017	1,991	+1.47%
2023	2,145	+1.25%

Source: EHESS and INSEE (1968-2023)

== Geography ==
Gosné is located at 24 km (15 mi) in the North-East of Rennes and at 49 km (30 mi) in the south of the Mont Saint-Michel.

The bordering communes are Saint-Aubin-du-Cormier, Liffré, and Ercé-près-Liffré.

== See also ==
- Communes of the Ille-et-Vilaine department
