= Javené =

Javené Javenaé (Gallo) Yaoueneg (Breton)
- Commune
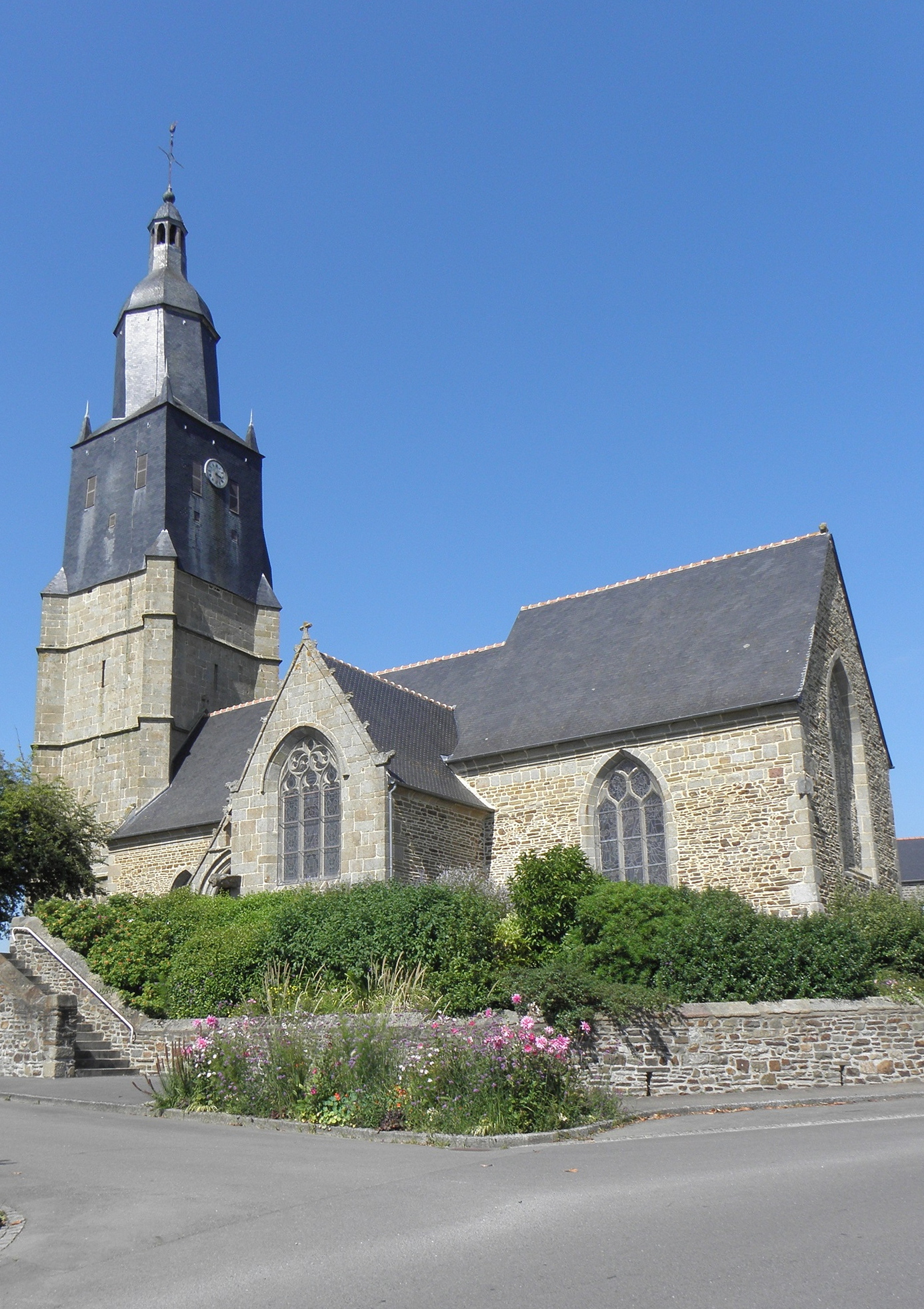
- The church of Saint-Martin
- Location of Javené
- Location within France Location within Brittany
- Coordinates: 48°19′12″N 1°12′52″W
- Country: France
- Region: Brittany
- Department: Ille-et-Vilaine
- Arrondissement: Fougères-Vitré
- Canton: Fougères-1
- Intercommunality: Fougères Agglomération

Government
  - Mayor (2020–2026): Bernard Delaunay
- Area^{1}: 18.45 km^{2} (7.12 sq mi)
- Highest elevation: 109 m (358 ft)
- Lowest elevation: 60 m (200 ft)
- Population (2023): 2,205
  - Density: 119.5/km^{2} (309.5/sq mi)
- Time zone: UTC+01:00 (CET)
  - Summer (DST): UTC+02:00 (CEST)
- INSEE/Postal code: 35137 /35133
- ^{1} French Land Register data, which excludes lakes, ponds, glaciers > 1 km^{2} (0.386 sq mi or 247 acres) and river estuaries.

Javené (French pronunciation: [ʒavne]; Breton: Yaoueneg; Gallo: Javenaé) is a commune in the Ille-et-Vilaine department in Brittany in northwestern France.

== Population ==
The inhabitants of Javené are known as Javenéens in French.

Historical population
Year	Pop.	±% p.a.
1968	736	—
1975	856	+2.18%
1982	1,168	+4.54%
1990	1,268	+1.03%
1999	1,517	+2.01%
2007	1,814	+2.26%
2012	1,973	+1.69%
2017	2,067	+0.94%
2023	2,205	+1.08%
Source: INSEE

== See also ==
- Communes of the Ille-et-Vilaine department
