= Rauville-la-Place =

- Commune
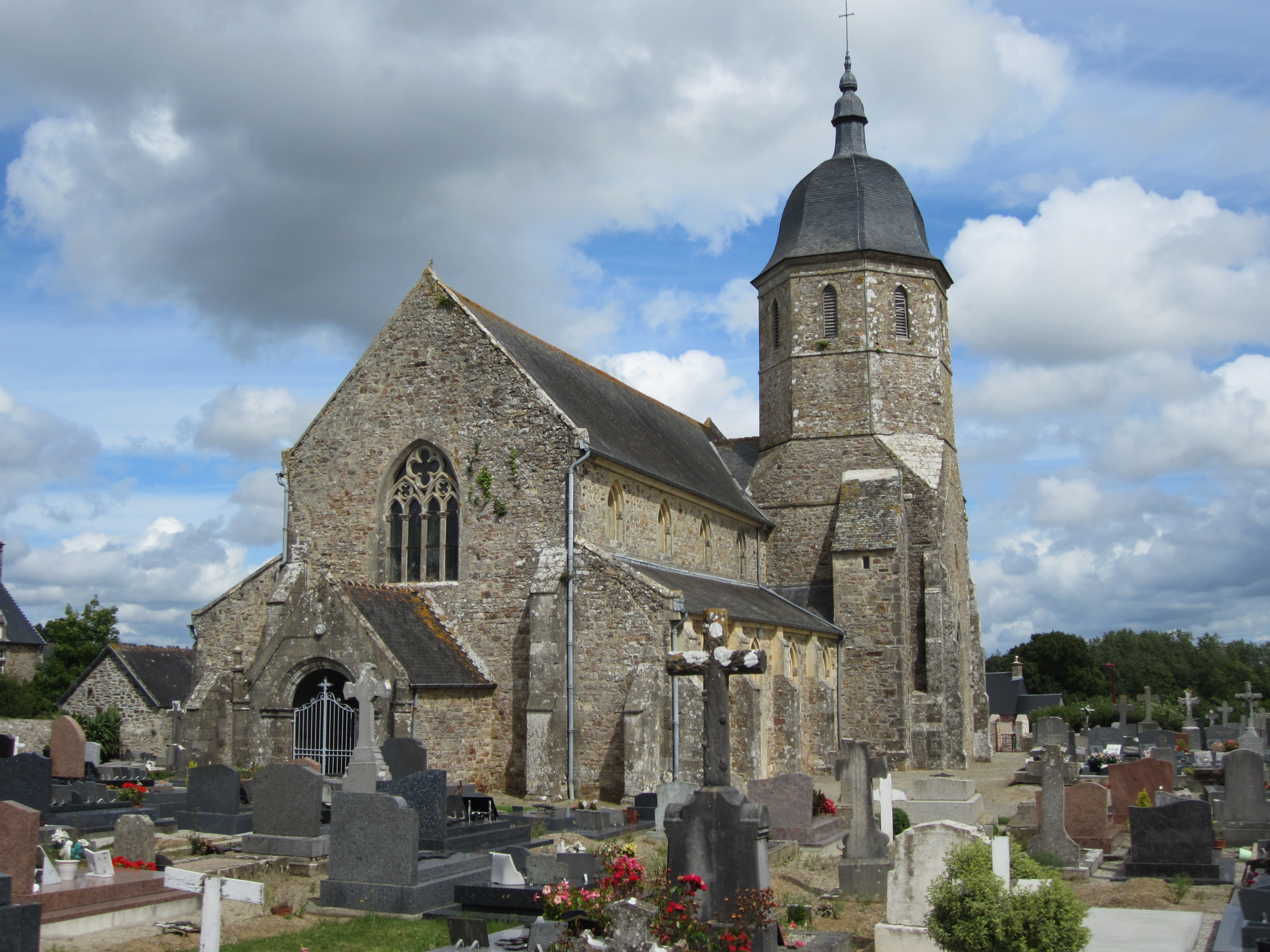
- The church in Rauville-la-Place

- Coat of arms
- Location of Rauville-la-Place
- Location within France Location within Normandy
- Coordinates: 49°23′21″N 1°30′12″W
- Country: France
- Region: Normandy
- Department: Manche
- Arrondissement: Cherbourg
- Canton: Bricquebec-en-Cotentin
- Intercommunality: CA Cotentin

Government
  - Mayor (2020–2026): Christian Faudemer
- Area^{1}: 11.88 km^{2} (4.59 sq mi)
- Elevation: 30 m (98 ft)
- Highest elevation: 46 m (151 ft)
- Lowest elevation: 2 m (6.6 ft)
- Population (2023): 399
  - Density: 33.6/km^{2} (87.0/sq mi)
- Time zone: UTC+01:00 (CET)
  - Summer (DST): UTC+02:00 (CEST)
- INSEE/Postal code: 50426 /50390
- ^{1} French Land Register data, which excludes lakes, ponds, glaciers > 1 km^{2} (0.386 sq mi or 247 acres) and river estuaries.

Rauville-la-Place (French pronunciation: [ʁovil la plas]) is a commune in the Manche department in Normandy France. It is located just to the northeast of Saint-Sauveur-le-Vicomte. In 2017 the population was 376.

== Demography ==
=== Population ===
Population growth and loss is shown in the following table:

Historical population
Year	Pop.	±% p.a.
1968	511	—
1975	418	−2.83%
1982	397	−0.73%
1990	418	+0.65%
1999	432	+0.37%
2007	391	−1.24%
2012	389	−0.10%
2017	376	−0.68%
2023	399	+0.99%
Source: INSEE

=== Homes ===
Rauville-la-Place had 227 homes, 172 were primary homes, of which thirty-five were second residences and fifteen were unoccupied. Two-hundred-seventeen of these were houses and three were apartment buildings. Of the 172 primary residences, 139 were occupied by its owners, 37 were occupied by renters and their families and three were let at no cost. Nine residences had two bedrooms, 23 had three, 44 had four and the rest had. 131 residences had one parking place on the property, with 82 residences having one vehicle, and 75 having two or more.

== Economy ==
In 2007, 245 residents were of working age, of which 186 were active and 59 inactive. Of the 186 people considered to be active, 175 were employed and eleven were unemployed. Of the fifty-nine who were inactive, thirty-one were retired, ten were students and eighteen were classified as "other inactive".

=== Income ===
In 2009 there were 172 properties in Rauville-la-Place, with a population of 387. The median annual taxable income per person was 17,816 €.

=== Economic Activity ===
Of the 11 business establishments in Rauville-la-Place in 2007, 1 was a grocer's, 6 were construction businesses, 2 were car repair businesses and 2 were lodging and restaurant businesses.

There were 6 service businesses in Rauville-la-Place in 2009: a bricklayer, a painter and plasterer, a carpenter, a plumber, an electrician and a restaurant.

The only commercial establishment in 2009 was a chemist's shop.

In 2000 there were 28 farms in Rauville-la-Place, occupying a total of 833 hectares.

== See also ==
- Communes of the Manche department
