= Livré-sur-Changeon =

Livré-sur-Changeon Livraé (Gallo) Liverieg-Kenton (Breton)
- Commune
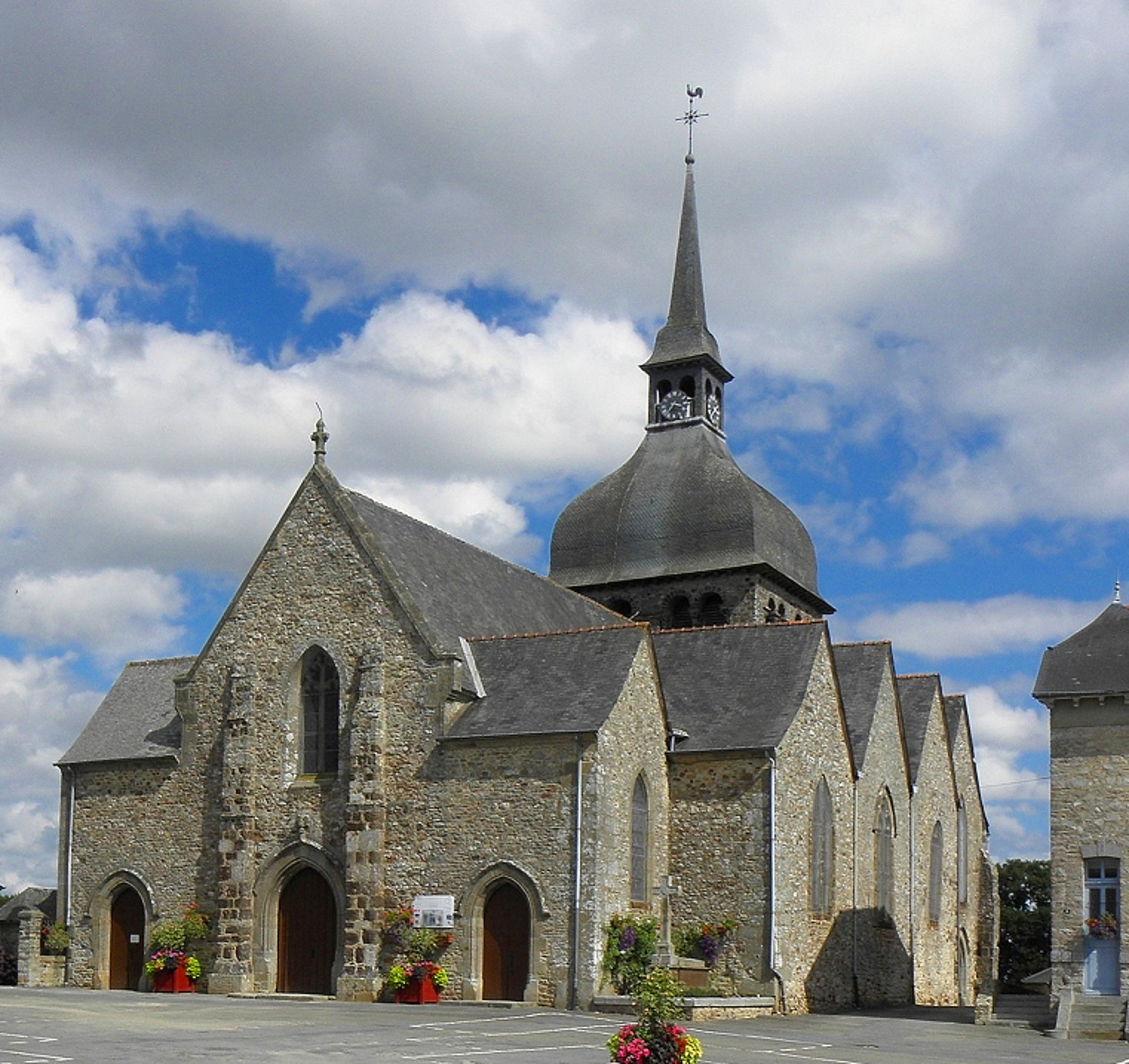
- The church of Notre-Dame, in Livré-sur-Changeon

- Coat of arms
- Location of Livré-sur-Changeon
- Location within France Location within Brittany
- Coordinates: 48°13′11″N 1°20′32″W
- Country: France
- Region: Brittany
- Department: Ille-et-Vilaine
- Arrondissement: Rennes
- Canton: Fougères-1

Government
  - Mayor (2020–2026): Emmanuel Fraud
- Area^{1}: 26.37 km^{2} (10.18 sq mi)
- Highest elevation: 126 m (413 ft)
- Lowest elevation: 59 m (194 ft)
- Population (2023): 1,758
  - Density: 66.67/km^{2} (172.7/sq mi)
- Time zone: UTC+01:00 (CET)
  - Summer (DST): UTC+02:00 (CEST)
- INSEE/Postal code: 35154 /35450
- ^{1} French Land Register data, which excludes lakes, ponds, glaciers > 1 km^{2} (0.386 sq mi or 247 acres) and river estuaries.

Livré-sur-Changeon (French pronunciation: [livʁe syʁ ʃɑ̃ʒɔ̃], lit. 'Livré on Changeon'; Gallo: Livraé, Breton: Liverieg-Kenton) is a commune in the Ille-et-Vilaine department of Brittany in north-western France.

== Population ==
Inhabitants of Livré-sur-Changeon are called in French livréens.

Historical population
Year	Pop.	±% p.a.
1968	1,125	—
1975	1,072	−0.69%
1982	1,078	+0.08%
1990	1,108	+0.34%
1999	1,137	+0.29%
2007	1,499	+3.52%
2012	1,674	+2.23%
2017	1,700	+0.31%
2023	1,758	+0.56%
Source: INSEE

== See also ==
- Communes of the Ille-et-Vilaine department
