= Combourtillé =

Combourtillé Conbórtilhaè (Gallo) Komorzhel (Breton)
- Commune
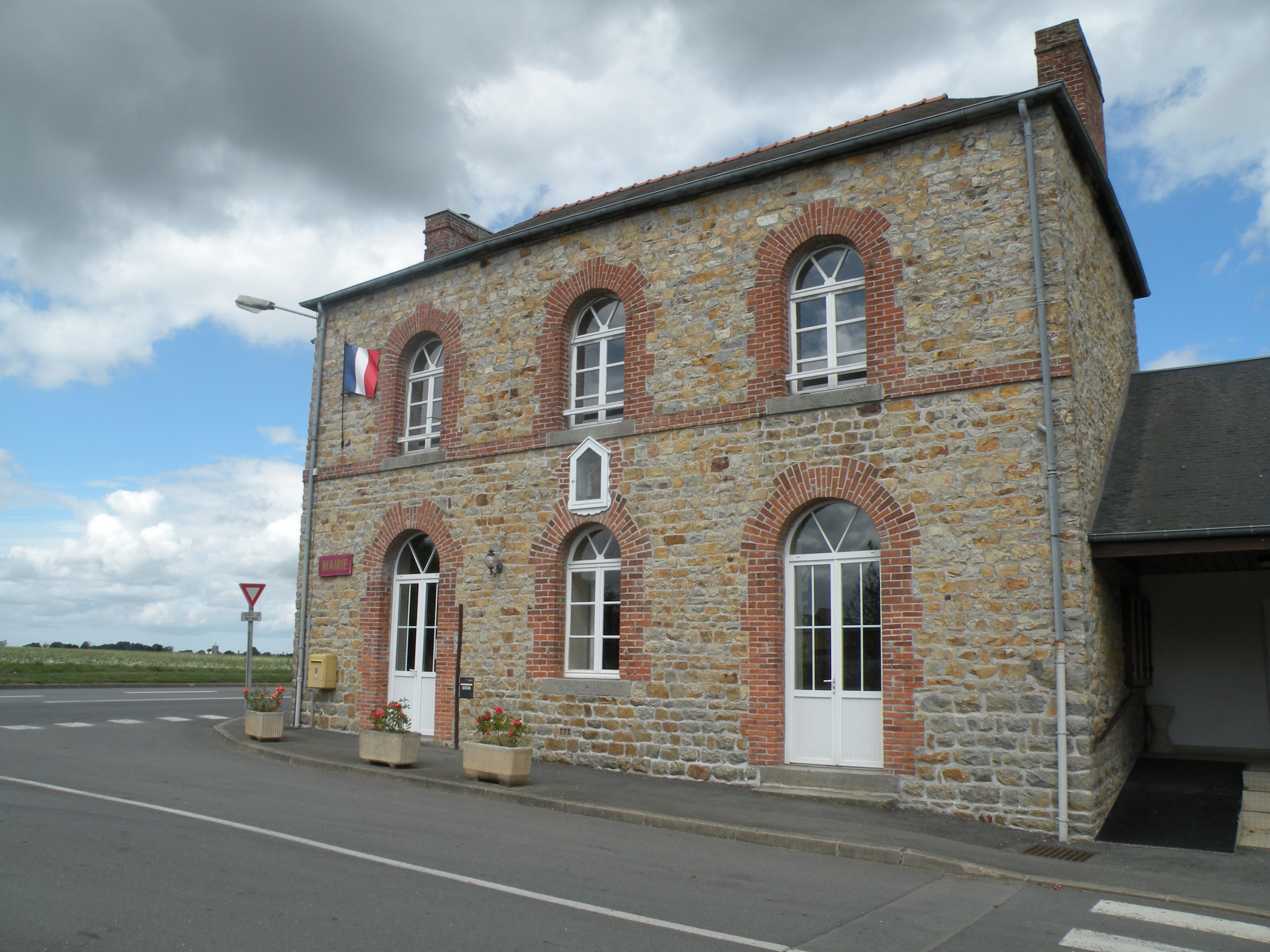
- Town hall
- Location of Combourtillé
- Location within France Location within Brittany
- Coordinates: 48°16′22″N 1°14′39″W
- Country: France
- Region: Brittany
- Department: Ille-et-Vilaine
- Arrondissement: Fougères-Vitré
- Canton: Fougères-1
- Intercommunality: Fougères Agglomération

Government
  - Mayor (2020–2026): Roland Bouvet
- Area^{1}: 9.25 km^{2} (3.57 sq mi)
- Highest elevation: 130 m (430 ft)
- Lowest elevation: 72 m (236 ft)
- Population (2023): 610
  - Density: 66/km^{2} (170/sq mi)
- Time zone: UTC+01:00 (CET)
  - Summer (DST): UTC+02:00 (CEST)
- INSEE/Postal code: 35086 /35210
- ^{1} French Land Register data, which excludes lakes, ponds, glaciers > 1 km^{2} (0.386 sq mi or 247 acres) and river estuaries.

Combourtillé (French pronunciation: [kɔ̃buʁtije]; Gallo: Conbórtilhaè, Breton: Komorzhel) is a commune in the Ille-et-Vilaine department of Brittany in north-western France.

== Population ==
Inhabitants of Combourtillé are called Combourtilléens in French.

Historical population
Year	Pop.	±% p.a.
1968	416	—
1975	370	−1.66%
1982	340	−1.20%
1990	363	+0.82%
1999	401	+1.11%
2007	531	+3.57%
2012	593	+2.23%
2017	611	+0.60%
2023	610	−0.03%
Source: INSEE

== See also ==
- Communes of the Ille-et-Vilaine department
