= Saint-Sauveur-des-Landes =

Saint-Sauveur-des-Landes Kersalver-al-Lann (Breton)
- Commune
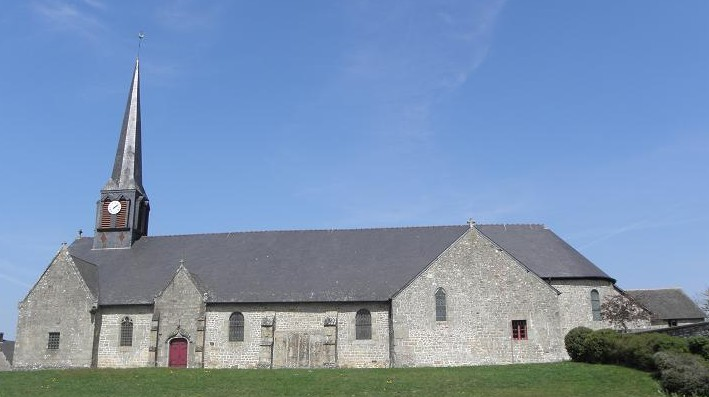
- The church of Saint-Sauveur-des-Landes
- Location of Saint-Sauveur-des-Landes
- Location within France Location within Brittany
- Coordinates: 48°20′36″N 1°18′45″W
- Country: France
- Region: Brittany
- Department: Ille-et-Vilaine
- Arrondissement: Fougères-Vitré
- Canton: Fougères-1
- Intercommunality: Fougères Agglomération

Government
  - Mayor (2023–2026): Christophe Deroyer
- Area^{1}: 18.84 km^{2} (7.27 sq mi)
- Highest elevation: 132 m (433 ft)
- Lowest elevation: 85 m (279 ft)
- Population (2023): 1,565
  - Density: 83.07/km^{2} (215.1/sq mi)
- Time zone: UTC+01:00 (CET)
  - Summer (DST): UTC+02:00 (CEST)
- INSEE/Postal code: 35310 /35133
- ^{1} French Land Register data, which excludes lakes, ponds, glaciers > 1 km^{2} (0.386 sq mi or 247 acres) and river estuaries.

Saint-Sauveur-des-Landes (French pronunciation: [sɛ̃ sovœʁ de lɑ̃d]; Breton: Kersalver-al-Lann) is a commune in the Ille-et-Vilaine department in Brittany in northwestern France.

== Population ==
Inhabitants of Saint-Sauveur-des-Landes are called Salvatoriens in French.

Historical population
Year	Pop.	±% p.a.
1968	881	—
1975	892	+0.18%
1982	957	+1.01%
1990	1,058	+1.26%
1999	994	−0.69%
2007	1,341	+3.81%
2012	1,481	+2.01%
2017	1,511	+0.40%
2023	1,565	+0.59%
Source: INSEE

== See also ==
- Communes of the Ille-et-Vilaine department
