= Romagné =

Romagné Romanyaé (Gallo) Rovenieg (Breton)
- Commune
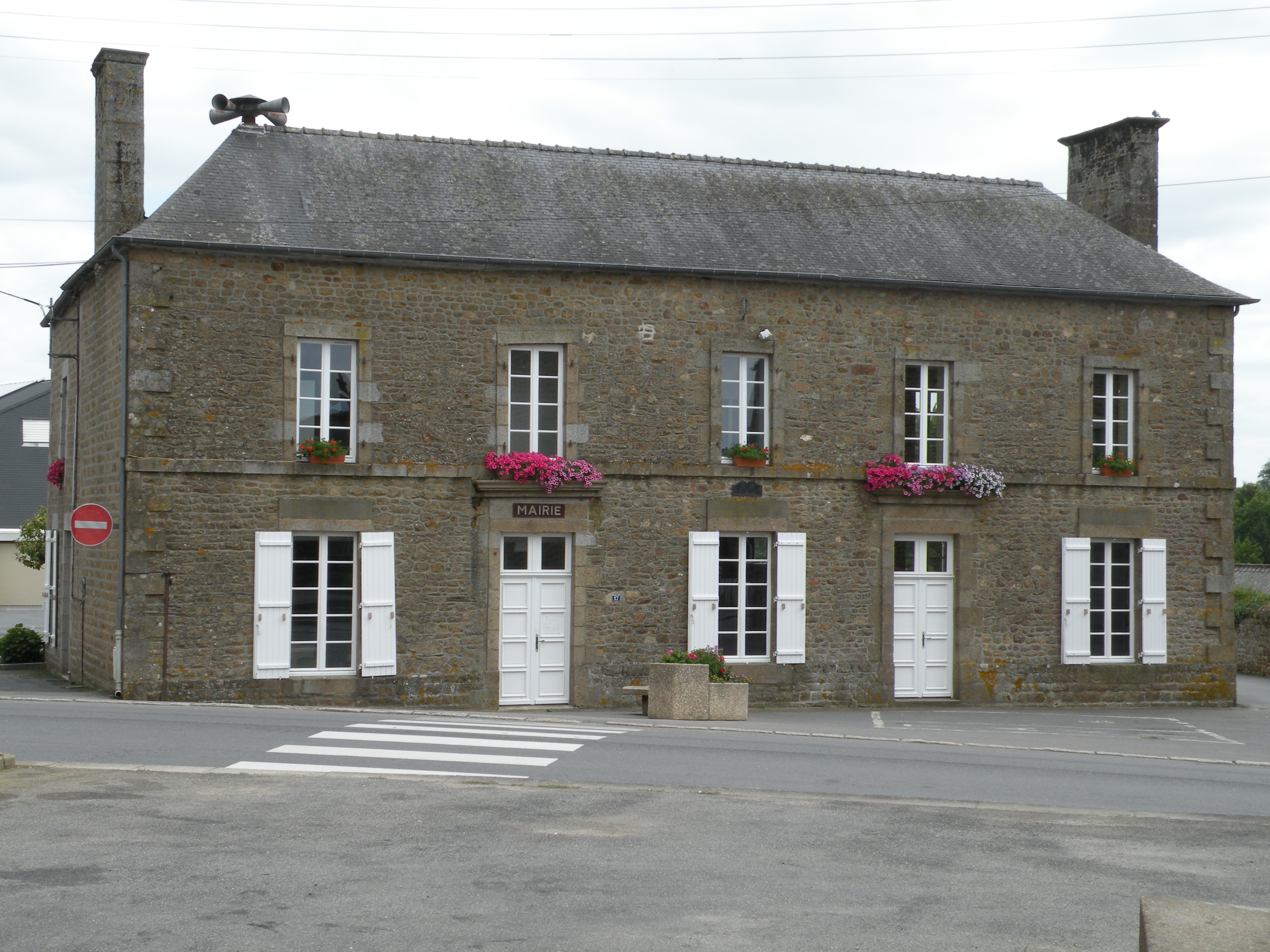
- The town hall in Romagné

- Coat of arms
- Location of Romagné
- Location within France Location within Brittany
- Coordinates: 48°20′35″N 1°16′34″W
- Country: France
- Region: Brittany
- Department: Ille-et-Vilaine
- Arrondissement: Fougères-Vitré
- Canton: Fougères-1
- Intercommunality: Fougères Agglomération

Government
  - Mayor (2020–2026): Cécile Parlot
- Area^{1}: 26.93 km^{2} (10.40 sq mi)
- Highest elevation: 171 m (561 ft)
- Lowest elevation: 57 m (187 ft)
- Population (2023): 2,438
  - Density: 90.53/km^{2} (234.5/sq mi)
- Time zone: UTC+01:00 (CET)
  - Summer (DST): UTC+02:00 (CEST)
- INSEE/Postal code: 35243 /35133
- ^{1} French Land Register data, which excludes lakes, ponds, glaciers > 1 km^{2} (0.386 sq mi or 247 acres) and river estuaries.

Romagné (French pronunciation: [ʁɔmaɲe]; Breton: Rovenieg; Gallo: Romanyaé) is a commune in the Ille-et-Vilaine department in Brittany in northwestern France.

== Population ==
Inhabitants of Romagné are called Romagnéens in French.

Historical population
Year	Pop.	±% p.a.
1968	1,113	—
1975	1,311	+2.37%
1982	1,581	+2.71%
1990	1,591	+0.08%
1999	1,605	+0.10%
2007	1,953	+2.48%
2012	2,264	+3.00%
2017	2,404	+1.21%
2023	2,438	+0.23%
Source: INSEE

== See also ==
- Communes of the Ille-et-Vilaine department
