= Billé =

Billé Bilhae (Gallo) Bilieg (Breton)
- Commune
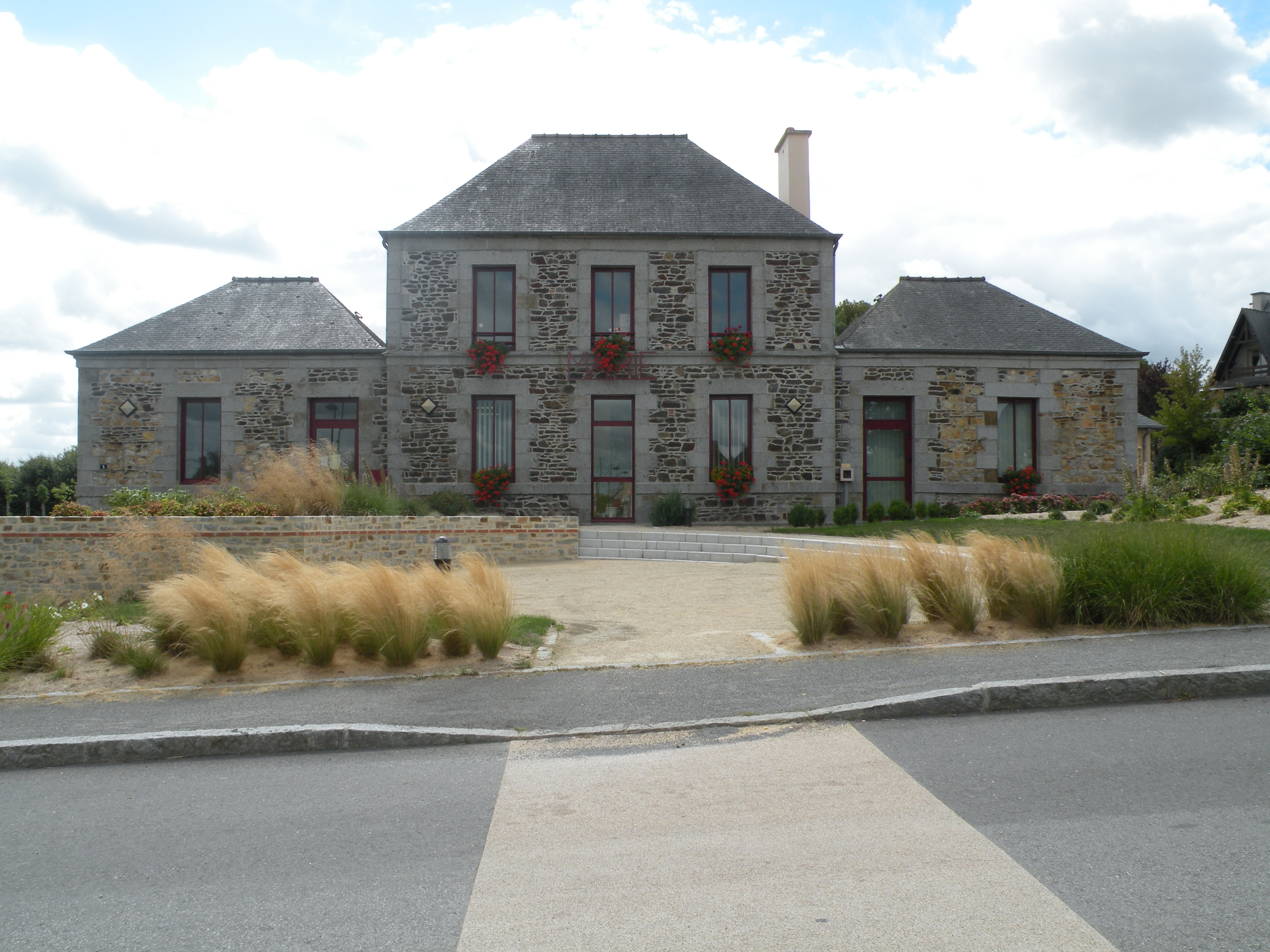
- Town hall
- Location of Billé
- Location within France Location within Brittany
- Coordinates: 48°17′19″N 1°14′42″W
- Country: France
- Region: Brittany
- Department: Ille-et-Vilaine
- Arrondissement: Fougères-Vitré
- Canton: Fougères-1
- Intercommunality: Fougères Agglomération

Government
  - Mayor (2020–2026): Daniel Balluais
- Area^{1}: 16.96 km^{2} (6.55 sq mi)
- Highest elevation: 117 m (384 ft)
- Lowest elevation: 57 m (187 ft)
- Population (2023): 1,010
  - Density: 59.6/km^{2} (154/sq mi)
- Time zone: UTC+01:00 (CET)
  - Summer (DST): UTC+02:00 (CEST)
- INSEE/Postal code: 35025 /35133
- ^{1} French Land Register data, which excludes lakes, ponds, glaciers > 1 km^{2} (0.386 sq mi or 247 acres) and river estuaries.

Billé (French pronunciation: [bije]; Breton: Bilieg; Gallo: Bilhae) is a commune in the Ille-et-Vilaine department in Brittany in northwestern France.

== Population ==
Historical population
Year	Pop.	±% p.a.
1968	683	—
1975	564	−2.70%
1982	702	+3.18%
1990	824	+2.02%
1999	832	+0.11%
2007	1,006	+2.40%
2012	1,035	+0.57%
2017	1,052	+0.33%
2023	1,010	−0.68%
Source: INSEE

Inhabitants of Billé are called Billéens in French.

== See also ==
- Communes of the Ille-et-Vilaine department
