= Couesnon =

River in France

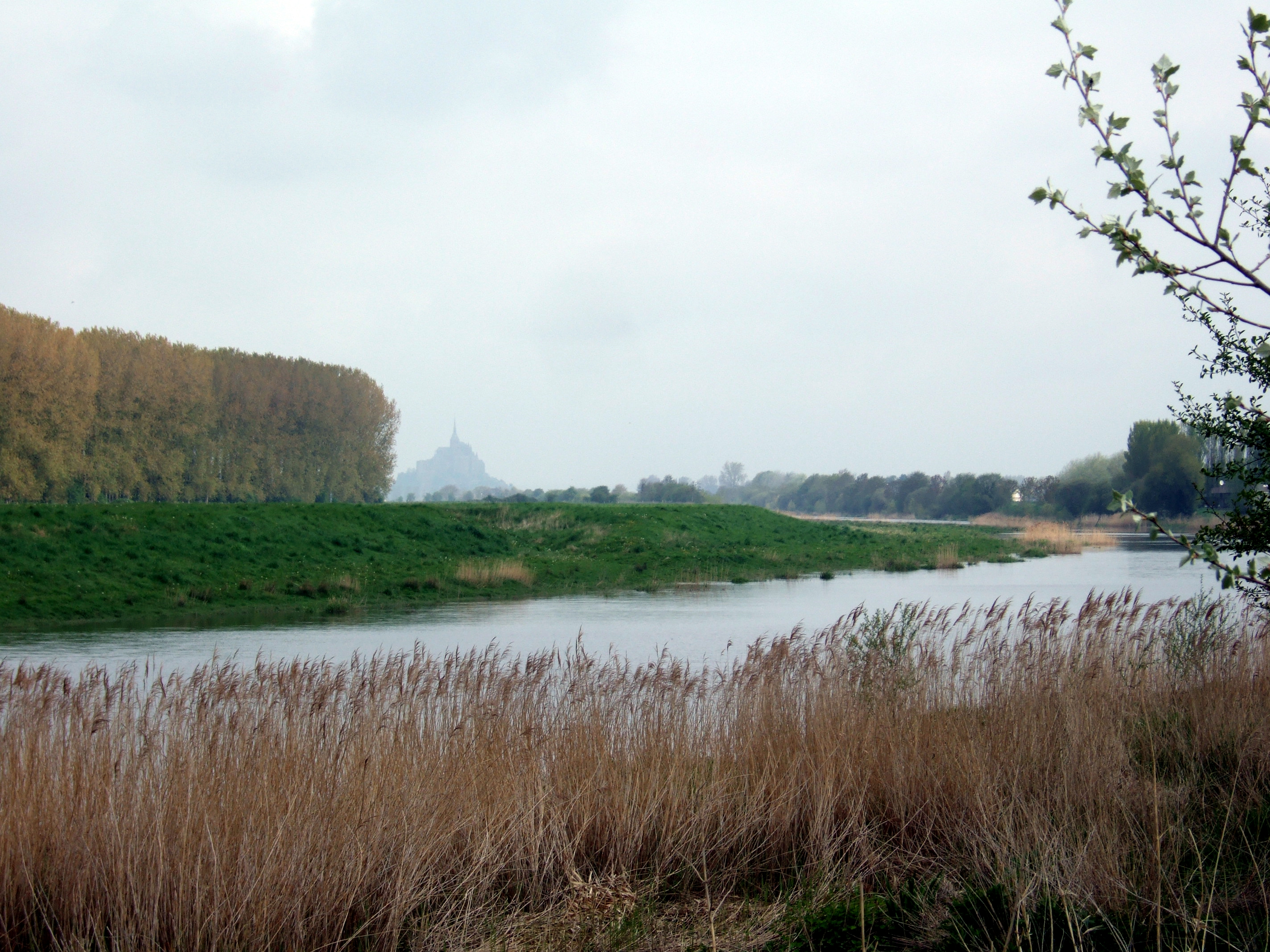
- The Couesnon near Pontorson, with Mont-Saint-Michel in the distance

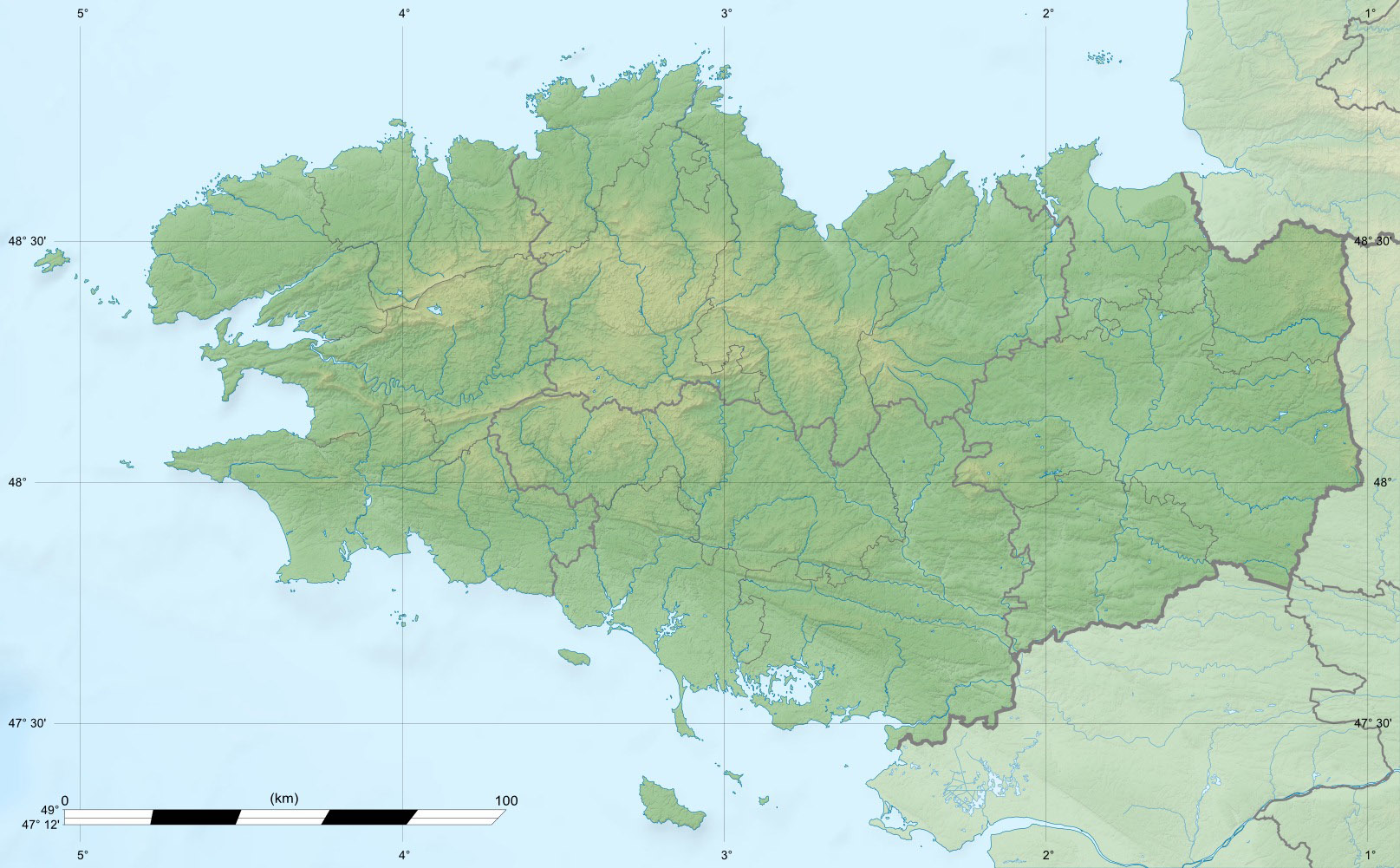
- Native name: Le Couesnon (French)

Location
- Country: France

Physical characteristics
- Source
  - location: Normandy
- Mouth
  - location: English Channel
  - coordinates: 48°37′4″N 1°30′41″W
- Length: 97.8 km (60.8 mi)
- Basin size: 1,124 km^{2} (434 sq mi)

The Couesnon (French pronunciation: [kwenɔ̃]; Breton: Kouenon) is a river running from the département of Mayenne in north-western France, forming an estuary at Mont-Saint-Michel. It is 97.8 km (60.8 mi) long, and its drainage basin is 1,124 km^{2} (434 sq mi). Its final stretch forms the border between the historical duchies of Normandy and Brittany. Its historically irregular course, shifting between two beds to the north and south of Mont-Saint-Michel until eventually settling on the southern one, inspired the saying Le Couesnon en sa folie mit le Mont en Normandie (“The Couesnon in its madness placed the Mont in Normandy") as the Mont is just to the Norman side of the river’s current mouth. However, the modern administrative boundary separating the two regions does not follow the river course; it is some six kilometres west of the Mont.

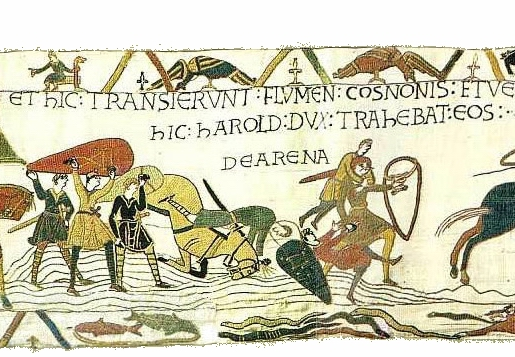
Harold Godwinson and his men cross flumen Cosnonis (the Cousesnon); Bayeux Tapestry

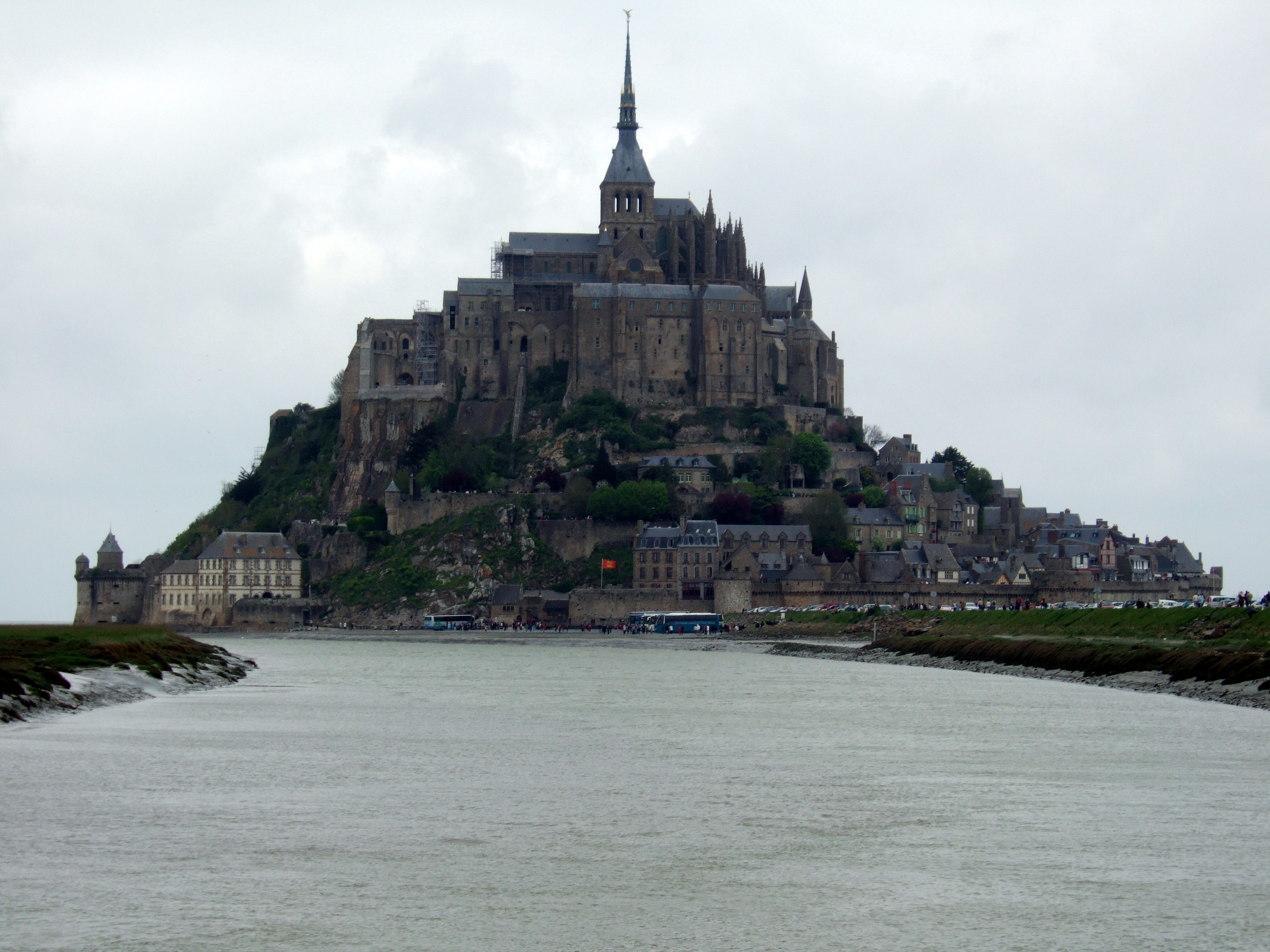
The mouth of the Couesnon, at Mont-Saint-Michel

== Geography ==
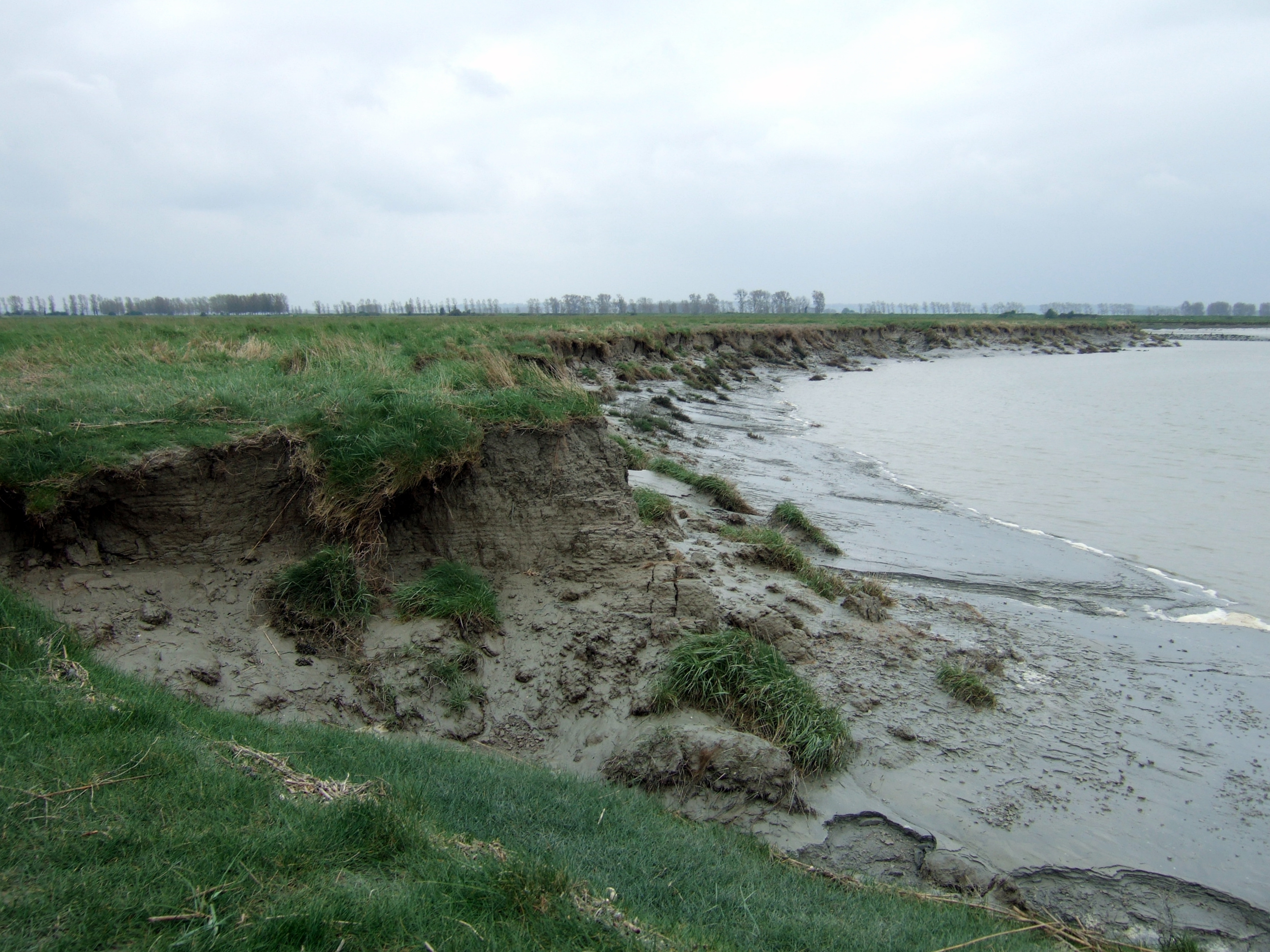
The muddy edges of the Couesnon are almost like quicksand to the unwary.

The Couesnon, the Sée and the Sélune form part of the complex water system of the bay of Mont-Saint-Michel. On one side, the tide brings large quantities of sediment which causes large sandbars within the river. On the other, the three watercourses drive the sediment back out to sea.

In the 20th century, the Couesnon was turned into a canal, to reduce the erosion of its banks. In 1969, a dam was built. These modifications, and the causeway linking Mont-Saint-Michel to the mainland, have caused the buildup of mudflats. To prevent the Mont front becoming too connected to the mainland, plans are in place to replace the causeway with a bridge, and to modify the dam so that the sediment can once again be driven out to sea.

During spring tides, a tidal bore — a wave caused by the incoming tide — can be seen working its way up the river.

The Couesnon flows through the following departments and towns:

- Ille-et-Vilaine: Fougères, Antrain
- Manche: Pontorson

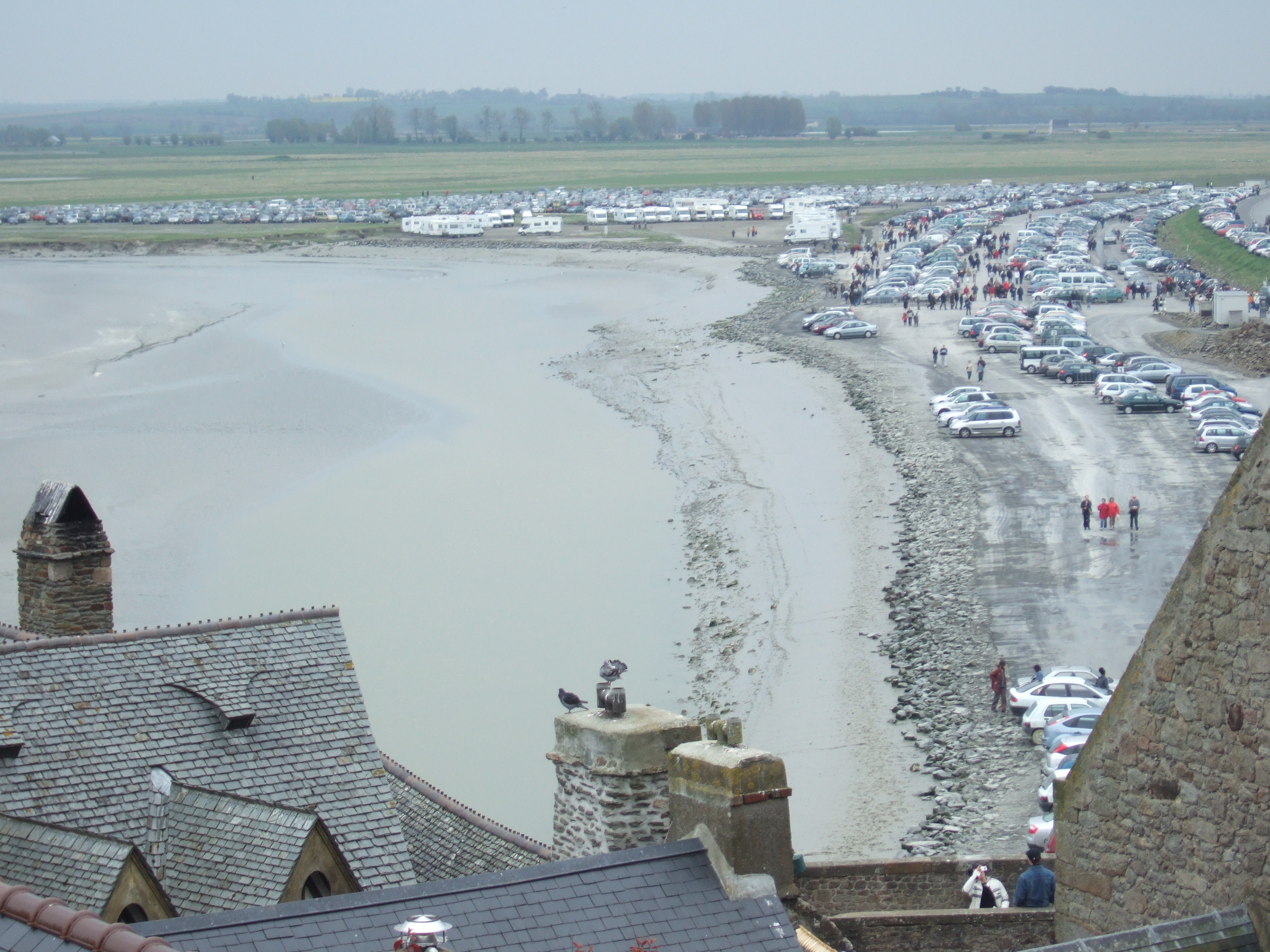
The causeway connecting Mont-Saint-Michel to the mainland, responsible for the massive buildup of mud and sediment in the area

== Hydrology and water quality ==
Summer flow is typically in the range of 4.2 cubic metres per second (150 cu ft/s). the pH has been measured at 8.26 (Hogan, 2006) and summer water temperature as 19 degrees Celsius in the area of the mouth. Water turbidity is moderate with a Secchi disc reading of 14 centimetres. Electrical conductivity at the mouth is high even at the verge of the tidal influence.
