= Canton of Fougères-1 =

Coordinates: 48.35°N 1.20°W

- Canton
- Country: France
- Region: Brittany
- Department: Ille-et-Vilaine
- No. of communes: {{{nbcomm}}}
- Population (2023): 33,082
- INSEE code: 35 08

The canton of Fougères-1 is an administrative division of the Ille-et-Vilaine department, in northwestern France. It was created at the French canton reorganisation which came into effect in March 2015. Its seat is in Fougères.

It consists of the following communes:

1. Billé
2. La Chapelle-Saint-Aubert
3. Combourtillé
4. Fougères (partly)
5. Gosné
6. Javené
7. Lécousse
8. Livré-sur-Changeon
9. Mézières-sur-Couesnon
10. Parcé
11. Rives-du-Couesnon
12. Romagné
13. Saint-Aubin-du-Cormier
14. Saint-Christophe-de-Valains
15. Saint-Ouen-des-Alleux
16. Saint-Sauveur-des-Landes
