= Arrondissement of Saint-Malo =

Coordinates: 48°39′N 2°01′W

Saint-Malo
- Arrondissement
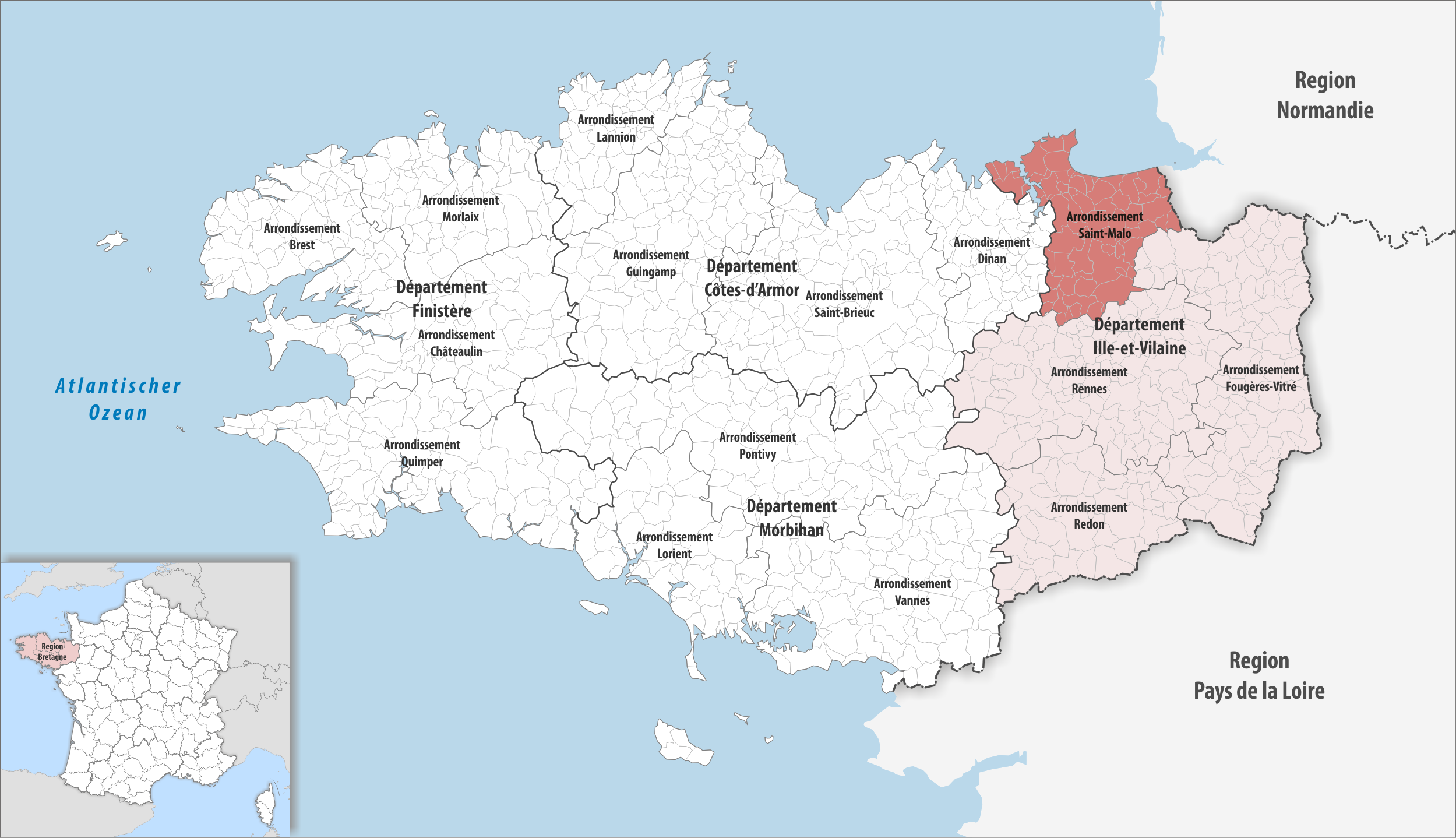
- Location within the region Brittany
- Country: France
- Region: Brittany
- Department: Ille-et-Vilaine
- No. of communes: {{{nbcomm}}}
- Area: 1,070.6 km^{2} (413.4 sq mi)
- Population (2023): 175,063
  - Density: 163.52/km^{2} (423.51/sq mi)
- INSEE code: 354

The arrondissement of Saint-Malo is an arrondissement of France in the Ille-et-Vilaine department in the Brittany region. It has 68 communes. Its population is 172,030 (2021), and its area is 1,070.6 km^{2} (413.4 sq mi).

== Composition ==
The communes of the arrondissement of Saint-Malo, and their INSEE codes, are:

1. Baguer-Morvan (35009)
2. Baguer-Pican (35010)
3. La Baussaine (35017)
4. Bonnemain (35029)
5. La Boussac (35034)
6. Broualan (35044)
7. Cancale (35049)
8. Cardroc (35050)
9. La Chapelle-aux-Filtzméens (35056)
10. Châteauneuf-d'Ille-et-Vilaine (35070)
11. Cherrueix (35078)
12. Combourg (35085)
13. Cuguen (35092)
14. Dinard (35093)
15. Dingé (35094)
16. Dol-de-Bretagne (35095)
17. Epiniac (35104)
18. La Fresnais (35116)
19. La Gouesnière (35122)
20. Hédé-Bazouges (35130)
21. Hirel (35132)
22. Les Iffs (35134)
23. Lanrigan (35148)
24. Lillemer (35153)
25. Longaulnay (35156)
26. Lourmais (35159)
27. Meillac (35172)
28. Mesnil-Roc'h (35308)
29. Miniac-Morvan (35179)
30. Le Minihic-sur-Rance (35181)
31. Mont-Dol (35186)
32. Pleine-Fougères (35222)
33. Plerguer (35224)
34. Plesder (35225)
35. Pleugueneuc (35226)
36. Pleurtuit (35228)
37. Québriac (35233)
38. La Richardais (35241)
39. Roz-Landrieux (35246)
40. Roz-sur-Couesnon (35247)
41. Sains (35248)
42. Saint-Benoît-des-Ondes (35255)
43. Saint-Briac-sur-Mer (35256)
44. Saint-Brieuc-des-Iffs (35258)
45. Saint-Broladre (35259)
46. Saint-Coulomb (35263)
47. Saint-Domineuc (35265)
48. Saint-Georges-de-Gréhaigne (35270)
49. Saint-Guinoux (35279)
50. Saint-Jouan-des-Guérets (35284)
51. Saint-Léger-des-Prés (35286)
52. Saint-Lunaire (35287)
53. Saint-Malo (35288)
54. Saint-Marcan (35291)
55. Saint-Méloir-des-Ondes (35299)
56. Saint-Père-Marc-en-Poulet (35306)
57. Saint-Suliac (35314)
58. Saint-Thual (35318)
59. Sougeal (35329)
60. Tinténiac (35337)
61. Trans-la-Forêt (35339)
62. Trémeheuc (35342)
63. Trévérien (35345)
64. Trimer (35346)
65. Le Tronchet (35362)
66. Vieux-Viel (35354)
67. La Ville-ès-Nonais (35358)
68. Le Vivier-sur-Mer (35361)

== History ==
The arrondissement of Saint-Malo was created in 1800. At the January 2017 reorganisation of the arrondissements of Ille-et-Vilaine, it gained seven communes from the arrondissement of Rennes.

As a result of the reorganisation of the cantons of France which came into effect in 2015, the borders of the cantons are no longer related to the borders of the arrondissements. The cantons of the arrondissement of Saint-Malo were, as of January 2015:

1. Cancale
2. Châteauneuf-d'Ille-et-Vilaine
3. Combourg
4. Dinard
5. Dol-de-Bretagne
6. Pleine-Fougères
7. Saint-Malo-Nord
8. Saint-Malo-Sud
9. Tinténiac
