= Saint Brieuc =

Saint Brieuc may refer to:

- Saint Brioc, an early 6th-century Welshman who became the first Abbot of Saint-Brieuc
- Saint-Brieuc Challenger, a professional tennis tournament
- Stade Briochin, a French association football team

== Places ==
- Saint-Brieuc, a commune in the Côtes-d'Armor Department in Brittany in north-western France
  - Arrondissement of Saint-Brieuc, France
  - Gare de Saint-Brieuc, a railway station
  - Roman Catholic Diocese of Saint-Brieuc
- Saint-Brieuc-des-Iffs, a commune in the Ille-et-Vilaine department in Brittany, France
- Saint-Brieuc-de-Mauron, a commune in the Morbihan department of Brittany, France
