= Plesder =

Plesder Pleder (Breton)
- Commune
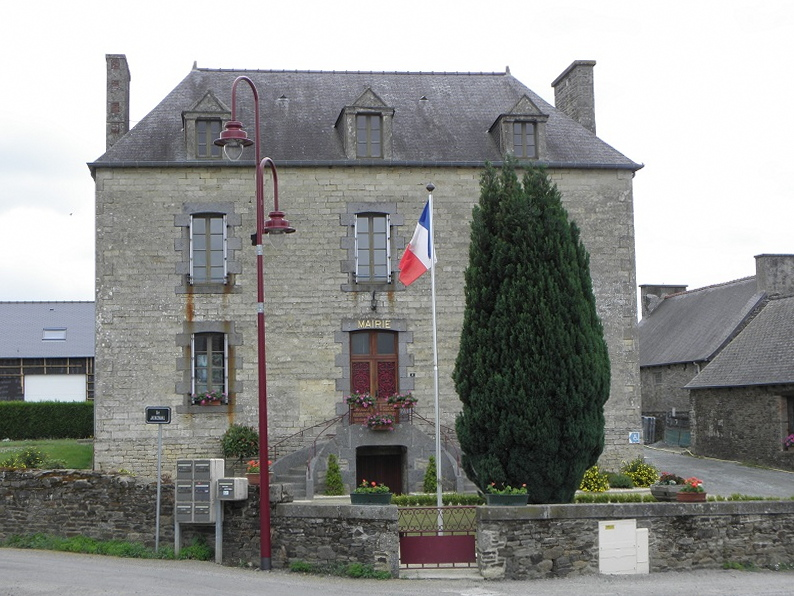
- The town hall of Plesder

- Coat of arms
- Location of Plesder
- Location within France Location within Brittany
- Coordinates: 48°24′51″N 1°55′17″W
- Country: France
- Region: Brittany
- Department: Ille-et-Vilaine
- Arrondissement: Saint-Malo
- Canton: Combourg
- Intercommunality: Bretagne Romantique

Government
  - Mayor (2020–2026): Évelyne Simon-Glory
- Area^{1}: 11.03 km^{2} (4.26 sq mi)
- Highest elevation: 97 m (318 ft)
- Lowest elevation: 18 m (59 ft)
- Population (2023): 790
  - Density: 72/km^{2} (190/sq mi)
- Time zone: UTC+01:00 (CET)
  - Summer (DST): UTC+02:00 (CEST)
- INSEE/Postal code: 35225 /35720
- ^{1} French Land Register data, which excludes lakes, ponds, glaciers > 1 km^{2} (0.386 sq mi or 247 acres) and river estuaries.

Plesder (Breton: Pleder) is a commune in the Ille-et-Vilaine department of Brittany in northwestern France.

== Population ==
Inhabitants of Plesder are called plesderois in French.

Historical population
Year	Pop.	±% p.a.
1968	670	—
1975	615	−1.22%
1982	517	−2.45%
1990	527	+0.24%
1999	569	+0.86%
2007	635	+1.38%
2012	729	+2.80%
2017	790	+1.62%
2023	790	+0.00%
Source: INSEE

== See also ==
- Communes of the Ille-et-Vilaine department
