= Pleugueneuc =

Pleugueneuc Ploegenoec (Gallo) Plegeneg (Breton)
- Commune
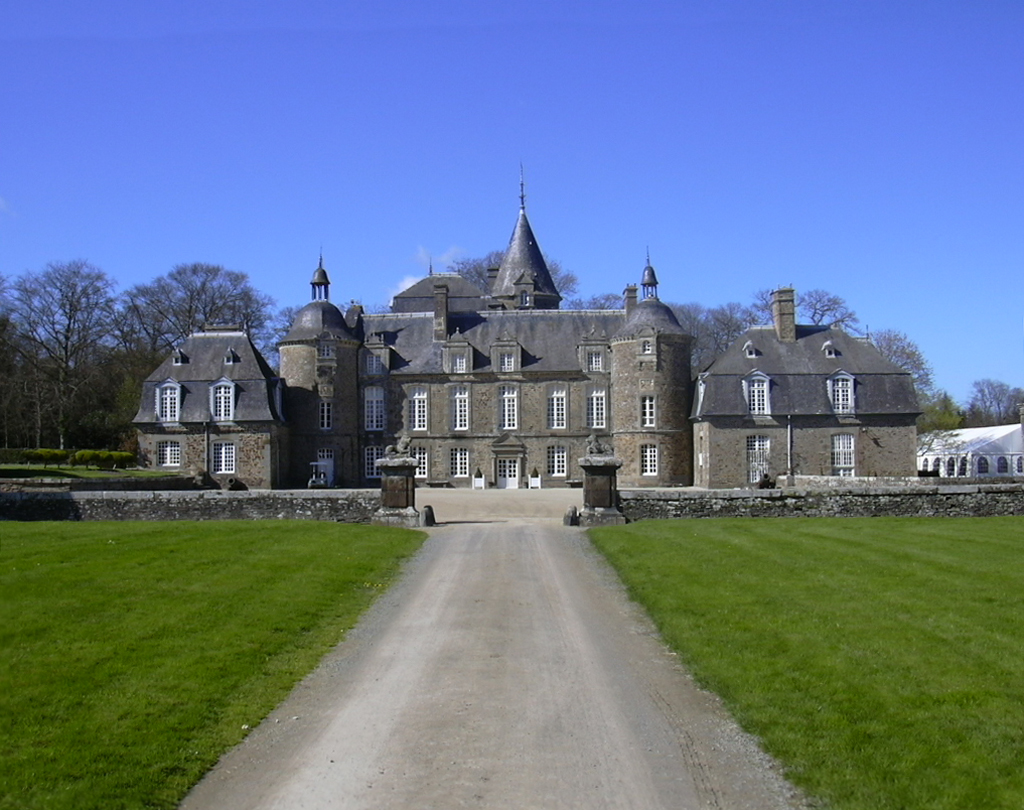
- The Château de la Bourbansais, in Pleugueneuc
- Location of Pleugueneuc
- Location within France Location within Brittany
- Coordinates: 48°23′50″N 1°54′09″W
- Country: France
- Region: Brittany
- Department: Ille-et-Vilaine
- Arrondissement: Saint-Malo
- Canton: Combourg
- Intercommunality: Bretagne Romantique

Government
  - Mayor (2020–2026): Loïc Régeard
- Area^{1}: 24.52 km^{2} (9.47 sq mi)
- Highest elevation: 89 m (292 ft)
- Lowest elevation: 17 m (56 ft)
- Population (2023): 2,087
  - Density: 85.11/km^{2} (220.4/sq mi)
- Time zone: UTC+01:00 (CET)
  - Summer (DST): UTC+02:00 (CEST)
- INSEE/Postal code: 35226 /35720
- ^{1} French Land Register data, which excludes lakes, ponds, glaciers > 1 km^{2} (0.386 sq mi or 247 acres) and river estuaries.

Pleugueneuc (French pronunciation: [pløɡnøk]; Breton: Plegeneg; Gallo: Ploegenoec) is a commune in the Ille-et-Vilaine department in Brittany in northwestern France.

== Population ==
Historical population
Year	Pop.	±% p.a.
1968	1,232	—
1975	1,151	−0.97%
1982	1,103	−0.61%
1990	1,132	+0.32%
1999	1,283	+1.40%
2007	1,554	+2.42%
2012	1,722	+2.07%
2017	1,903	+2.02%
2023	2,087	+1.55%
Source: INSEE

Inhabitants of Pleugueneuc are called Pleugueneucois in French.

== See also ==
- Communes of the Ille-et-Vilaine department
