= Vieux-Viel =

Vieux-Viel Vioez-Viéu (Gallo) Henwiel (Breton)
- Commune
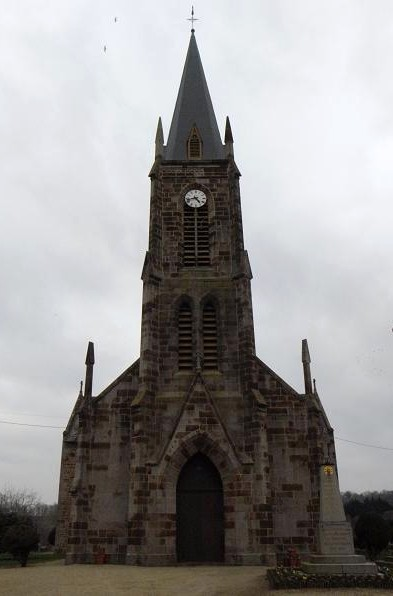
- The church in Vieux-Viel

- Coat of arms
- Location of Vieux-Viel
- Location within France Location within Brittany
- Coordinates: 48°30′43″N 1°32′36″W
- Country: France
- Region: Brittany
- Department: Ille-et-Vilaine
- Arrondissement: Saint-Malo
- Canton: Dol-de-Bretagne
- Intercommunality: Pays de Dol et Baie du Mont Saint-Michel

Government
  - Mayor (2020–2026): Gérard Dufeu
- Area^{1}: 8.77 km^{2} (3.39 sq mi)
- Highest elevation: 108 m (354 ft)
- Lowest elevation: 14 m (46 ft)
- Population (2023): 329
  - Density: 37.5/km^{2} (97.2/sq mi)
- Time zone: UTC+01:00 (CET)
  - Summer (DST): UTC+02:00 (CEST)
- INSEE/Postal code: 35354 /35610
- ^{1} French Land Register data, which excludes lakes, ponds, glaciers > 1 km^{2} (0.386 sq mi or 247 acres) and river estuaries.

Vieux-Viel (French pronunciation: [vjø vjɛl]; Gallo: Vioez-Viéu, Breton: Henwiel) is a commune in the Ille-et-Vilaine department of Brittany in northwestern France.

== Population ==
Inhabitants of Vieux-Viel are called in French Vieux-Viellois.

Historical population
Year	Pop.	±% p.a.
1968	429	—
1975	396	−1.14%
1982	346	−1.91%
1990	323	−0.86%
1999	275	−1.77%
2007	287	+0.54%
2012	310	+1.55%
2017	315	+0.32%
2023	329	+0.73%
Source: INSEE

== See also ==
- Communes of the Ille-et-Vilaine department
