= Saint-Léger-des-Prés =

Saint-Léger-des-Prés Sant-Lezer-an-Pradeier (Breton)
- Commune
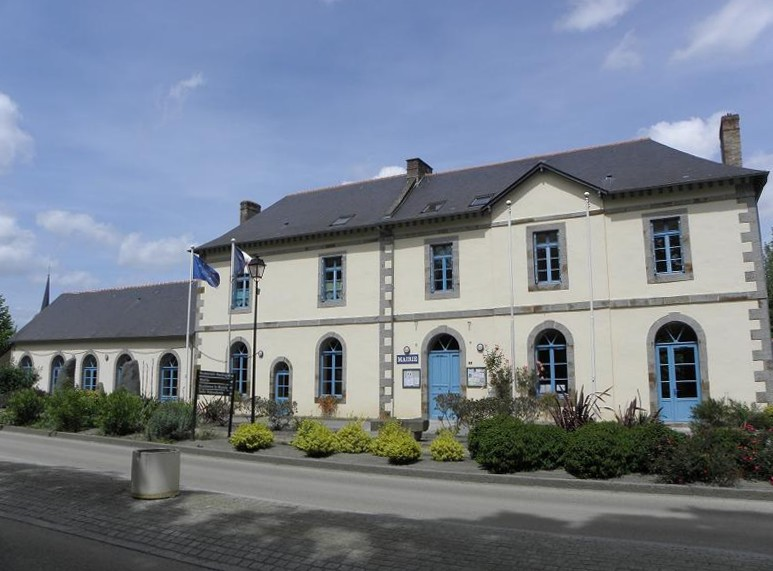
- The town hall of Saint-Léger-des-Prés
- Location of Saint-Léger-des-Prés
- Location within France Location within Brittany
- Coordinates: 48°23′46″N 1°39′00″W
- Country: France
- Region: Brittany
- Department: Ille-et-Vilaine
- Arrondissement: Saint-Malo
- Canton: Combourg
- Intercommunality: CC Bretagne Romantique

Government
  - Mayor (2020–2026): Olivier Bernard
- Area^{1}: 5.54 km^{2} (2.14 sq mi)
- Highest elevation: 86 m (282 ft)
- Lowest elevation: 40 m (130 ft)
- Population (2023): 293
  - Density: 52.9/km^{2} (137/sq mi)
- Time zone: UTC+01:00 (CET)
  - Summer (DST): UTC+02:00 (CEST)
- INSEE/Postal code: 35286 /35270
- ^{1} French Land Register data, which excludes lakes, ponds, glaciers > 1 km^{2} (0.386 sq mi or 247 acres) and river estuaries.

Saint-Léger-des-Prés (French pronunciation: [sɛ̃ leʒe de pʁe]; Breton: Sant-Lezer-ar-Pradeier) is a commune in the Ille-et-Vilaine department of Brittany in northwestern France.

== Population ==
Historical population
Year	Pop.	±% p.a.
1968	293	—
1975	250	−2.24%
1982	230	−1.18%
1990	231	+0.05%
1999	232	+0.05%
2007	214	−1.00%
2012	238	+2.15%
2017	264	+2.10%
2023	293	+1.75%
Source: INSEE

== See also ==
- Communes of the Ille-et-Vilaine department
