= Saint-Thual =

Saint-Thual Saent Tuau (Gallo) Sant-Tual (Breton)
- Commune
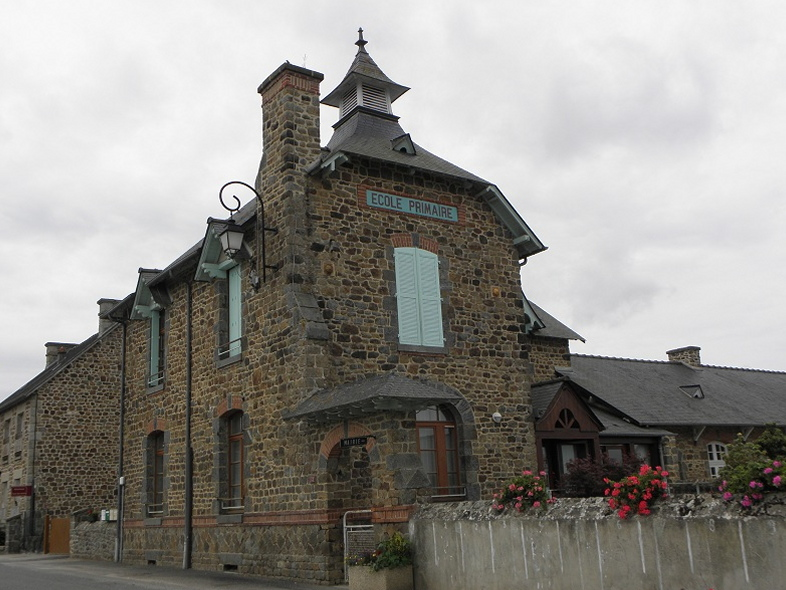
- The town hall of Saint-Thual
- Location of Saint-Thual
- Location within France Location within Brittany
- Coordinates: 48°20′15″N 1°55′57″W
- Country: France
- Region: Brittany
- Department: Ille-et-Vilaine
- Arrondissement: Saint-Malo
- Canton: Combourg
- Intercommunality: CC Bretagne Romantique

Government
  - Mayor (2020–2026): Loïc Commeureuc
- Area^{1}: 11.40 km^{2} (4.40 sq mi)
- Highest elevation: 126 m (413 ft)
- Lowest elevation: 33 m (108 ft)
- Population (2023): 996
  - Density: 87.4/km^{2} (226/sq mi)
- Time zone: UTC+01:00 (CET)
  - Summer (DST): UTC+02:00 (CEST)
- INSEE/Postal code: 35318 /35190
- ^{1} French Land Register data, which excludes lakes, ponds, glaciers > 1 km^{2} (0.386 sq mi or 247 acres) and river estuaries.

Saint-Thual (French pronunciation: [sɛ̃ tɥal]; Breton: Sant-Tual; Gallo: Saent-Tuau) is a commune in the Ille-et-Vilaine department in Brittany in northwestern France.

== Population ==
Inhabitants of Saint-Thual are called Saint-Thualais in French.

Historical population
Year	Pop.	±% p.a.
1968	468	—
1975	423	−1.43%
1982	376	−1.67%
1990	391	+0.49%
1999	412	+0.58%
2007	644	+5.74%
2012	802	+4.49%
2017	915	+2.67%
2023	996	+1.42%
Source: INSEE

== See also ==
- Communes of the Ille-et-Vilaine department
  - Jean-Marie Valentin
