= La Baussaine =

La Baussaine La Bauczaènn (Gallo) Baosan (Breton)
- Commune
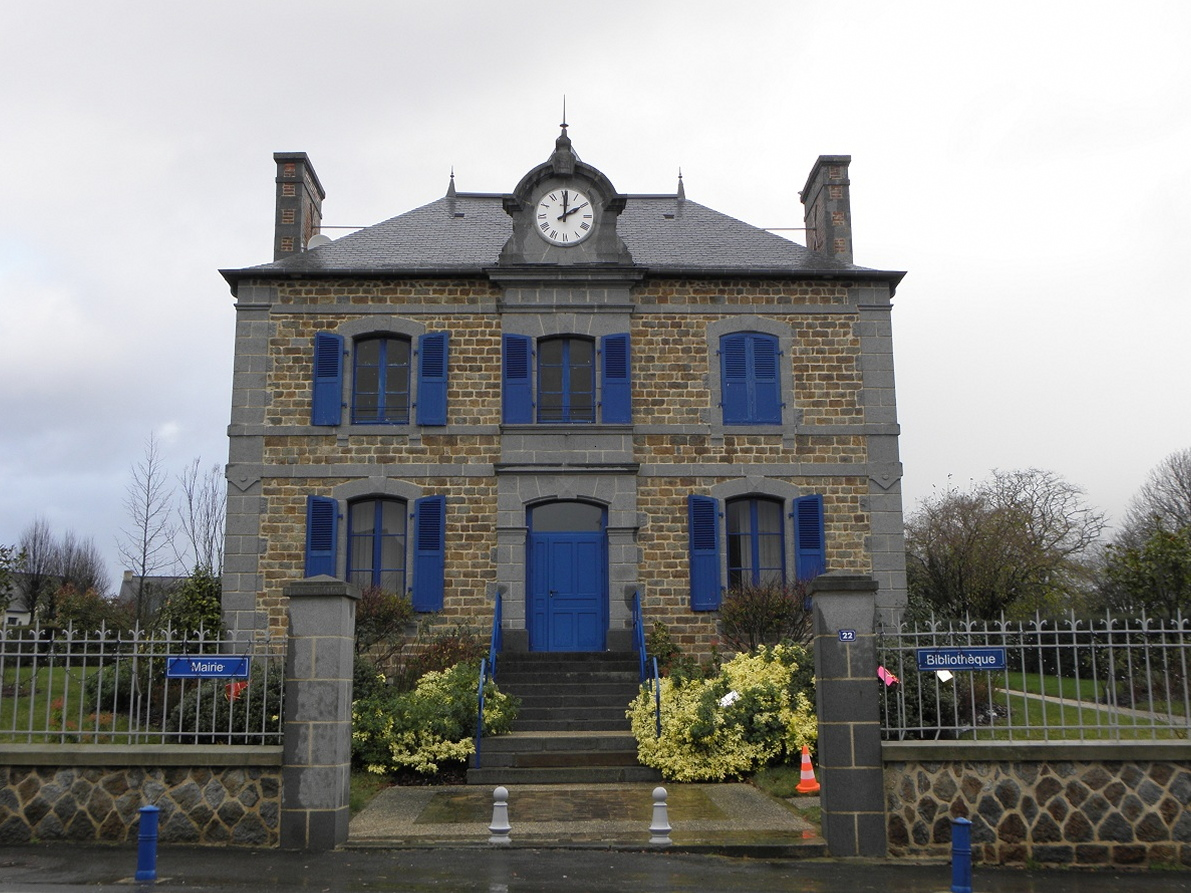
- Town hall
- Location of La Baussaine
- Location within France Location within Brittany
- Coordinates: 48°18′51″N 1°53′49″W
- Country: France
- Region: Brittany
- Department: Ille-et-Vilaine
- Arrondissement: Saint-Malo
- Canton: Combourg
- Intercommunality: CC Bretagne Romantique

Government
  - Mayor (2020–2026): Jérémy Loisel
- Area^{1}: 9.63 km^{2} (3.72 sq mi)
- Highest elevation: 117 m (384 ft)
- Lowest elevation: 48 m (157 ft)
- Population (2023): 675
  - Density: 70.1/km^{2} (182/sq mi)
- Time zone: UTC+01:00 (CET)
  - Summer (DST): UTC+02:00 (CEST)
- INSEE/Postal code: 35017 /35190
- ^{1} French Land Register data, which excludes lakes, ponds, glaciers > 1 km^{2} (0.386 sq mi or 247 acres) and river estuaries.

La Baussaine (French pronunciation: [la bosɛn]; Breton: Baosan; Gallo: La Bauczaènn) is a commune in the Ille-et-Vilaine department in Brittany in northwestern France.

== Population ==
Historical population
| Year | Pop. | ±% p.a. |
|---|---|---|
| 1968 | 509 | — |
| 1975 | 435 | −2.22% |
| 1982 | 421 | −0.47% |
| 1990 | 447 | +0.75% |
| 1999 | 474 | +0.65% |
| 2007 | 594 | +2.86% |
| 2012 | 632 | +1.25% |
| 2017 | 667 | +1.08% |
| 2023 | 675 | +0.20% |
Source: INSEE

Inhabitants of La Baussaine are called Baussainais in French.

== Sights ==
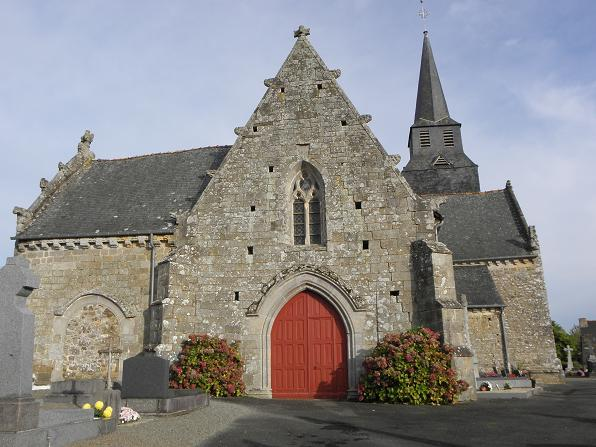
Church of Saint Léon

The church of Saint Léon was built in the 15th century of Bécherel granite. It was classified as a historic monument in 1926. Although they are damaged, the stained-glass windows are an excellent example of 16th-century art. Two of the panels can be attributed to Guyon Collin.

== See also ==
- Communes of the Ille-et-Vilaine department
