= Meillac =

Meillac Melhac (Gallo) Melieg (Breton)
- Commune
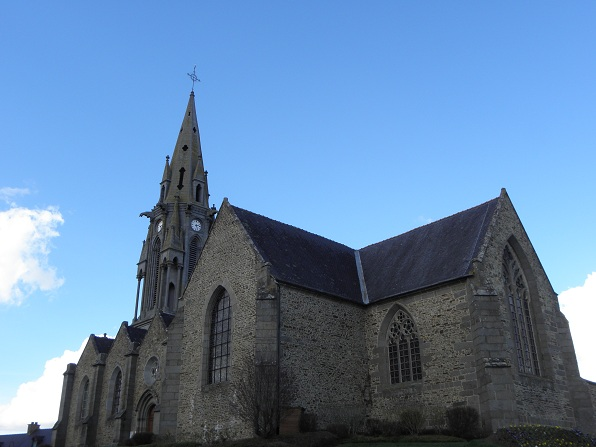
- The church of Saint-Martin, in Meillac
- Location of Meillac
- Location within France Location within Brittany
- Coordinates: 48°24′47″N 1°48′44″W
- Country: France
- Region: Brittany
- Department: Ille-et-Vilaine
- Arrondissement: Saint-Malo
- Canton: Combourg
- Intercommunality: Bretagne Romantique

Government
  - Mayor (2020–2026): Georges Dumas
- Area^{1}: 32.21 km^{2} (12.44 sq mi)
- Highest elevation: 92 m (302 ft)
- Lowest elevation: 22 m (72 ft)
- Population (2023): 1,974
  - Density: 61.29/km^{2} (158.7/sq mi)
- Time zone: UTC+01:00 (CET)
  - Summer (DST): UTC+02:00 (CEST)
- INSEE/Postal code: 35172 /35270
- ^{1} French Land Register data, which excludes lakes, ponds, glaciers > 1 km^{2} (0.386 sq mi or 247 acres) and river estuaries.

Meillac (French pronunciation: [mɛjak]; Breton: Melieg; Gallo: Melhac) is a commune in the Ille-et-Vilaine department in Brittany in northwestern France.

== Population ==
Inhabitants of Meillac are called Meillacois in French.

Historical population
Year	Pop.	±% p.a.
1968	1,424	—
1975	1,295	−1.35%
1982	1,357	+0.67%
1990	1,380	+0.21%
1999	1,352	−0.23%
2007	1,589	+2.04%
2012	1,776	+2.25%
2017	1,848	+0.80%
2023	1,974	+1.11%
Source: INSEE

== See also ==
- Communes of the Ille-et-Vilaine department
