= Roz-Landrieux =

Roz-Landrieux Roz-Landrioec (Gallo) Roz-Lanrieg (Breton)
- Commune
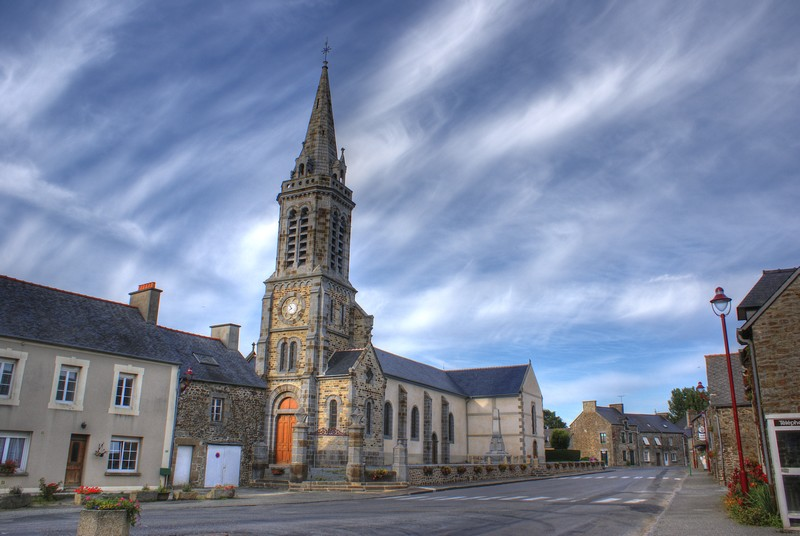
- The church of Saint-Pierre, in Roz-Landrieux
- Location of Roz-Landrieux
- Location within France Location within Brittany
- Coordinates: 48°32′38″N 1°48′53″W
- Country: France
- Region: Brittany
- Department: Ille-et-Vilaine
- Arrondissement: Saint-Malo
- Canton: Dol-de-Bretagne
- Intercommunality: Pays de Dol et Baie du Mont Saint-Michel

Government
  - Mayor (2020–2026): François Mainsard
- Area^{1}: 18.10 km^{2} (6.99 sq mi)
- Highest elevation: 50 m (160 ft)
- Lowest elevation: 0 m (0 ft)
- Population (2023): 1,378
  - Density: 76.13/km^{2} (197.2/sq mi)
- Time zone: UTC+01:00 (CET)
  - Summer (DST): UTC+02:00 (CEST)
- INSEE/Postal code: 35246 /35120
- ^{1} French Land Register data, which excludes lakes, ponds, glaciers > 1 km^{2} (0.386 sq mi or 247 acres) and river estuaries.

Roz-Landrieux (Gallo: Roz-Landrioec, Breton: Roz-Lanrieg) is a commune in the Ille-et-Vilaine department in Brittany in northwestern France.

== Population ==
Inhabitants of Roz-Landrieux are called Rozéens in French.

Historical population
| Year | Pop. | ±% p.a. |
|---|---|---|
| 1968 | 962 | — |
| 1975 | 937 | −0.38% |
| 1982 | 865 | −1.14% |
| 1990 | 939 | +1.03% |
| 1999 | 1,057 | +1.32% |
| 2007 | 1,173 | +1.31% |
| 2012 | 1,313 | +2.28% |
| 2017 | 1,340 | +0.41% |
| 2023 | 1,378 | +0.47% |
Source: INSEE

== See also ==
- Communes of the Ille-et-Vilaine department
