= Saint-Georges-de-Gréhaigne =

Saint-Georges-de-Gréhaigne Saent-Jord-de-Gerhaènn (Gallo) Sant-Jord-Grehan (Breton)
- Commune
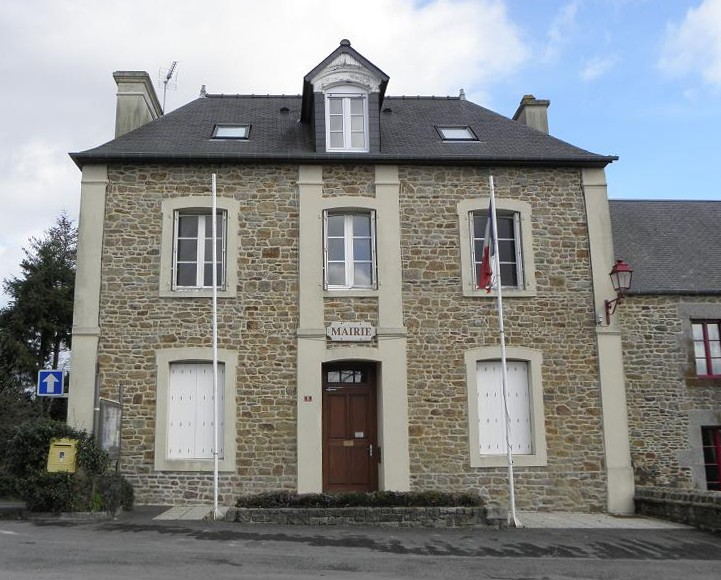
- The town hall of Saint-Georges-de-Gréhaigne

- Coat of arms
- Location of Saint-Georges-de-Gréhaigne
- Location within France Location within Brittany
- Coordinates: 48°34′08″N 1°32′52″W
- Country: France
- Region: Brittany
- Department: Ille-et-Vilaine
- Arrondissement: Saint-Malo
- Canton: Dol-de-Bretagne
- Intercommunality: Pays de Dol et Baie du Mont Saint-Michel

Government
  - Mayor (2020–2026): Jean-Pierre Héry
- Area^{1}: 12.15 km^{2} (4.69 sq mi)
- Highest elevation: 81 m (266 ft)
- Lowest elevation: 5 m (16 ft)
- Population (2023): 384
  - Density: 31.6/km^{2} (81.9/sq mi)
- Time zone: UTC+01:00 (CET)
  - Summer (DST): UTC+02:00 (CEST)
- INSEE/Postal code: 35270 /35610
- ^{1} French Land Register data, which excludes lakes, ponds, glaciers > 1 km^{2} (0.386 sq mi or 247 acres) and river estuaries.

Saint-Georges-de-Gréhaigne (French pronunciation: [sɛ̃ ʒɔʁʒ də ɡʁe.ɛɲ]; Gallo: Saent-Jord-de-Gerhaènn, Breton: Sant-Jord-Grehan) is a commune in the Ille-et-Vilaine department of Brittany in north-western France.

== Population ==
Historical population
| Year | Pop. | ±% p.a. |
|---|---|---|
| 1968 | 377 | — |
| 1975 | 357 | −0.78% |
| 1982 | 348 | −0.36% |
| 1990 | 386 | +1.30% |
| 1999 | 380 | −0.17% |
| 2007 | 356 | −0.81% |
| 2012 | 364 | +0.45% |
| 2017 | 370 | +0.33% |
| 2023 | 384 | +0.62% |
Source: INSEE

Inhabitants of Saint-Georges-de-Gréhaigne are called grehaignois in French.

== See also ==
- Communes of the Ille-et-Vilaine department
