= Québriac =

Québriac Cóberiac (Gallo) Kevrieg (Breton)
- Commune
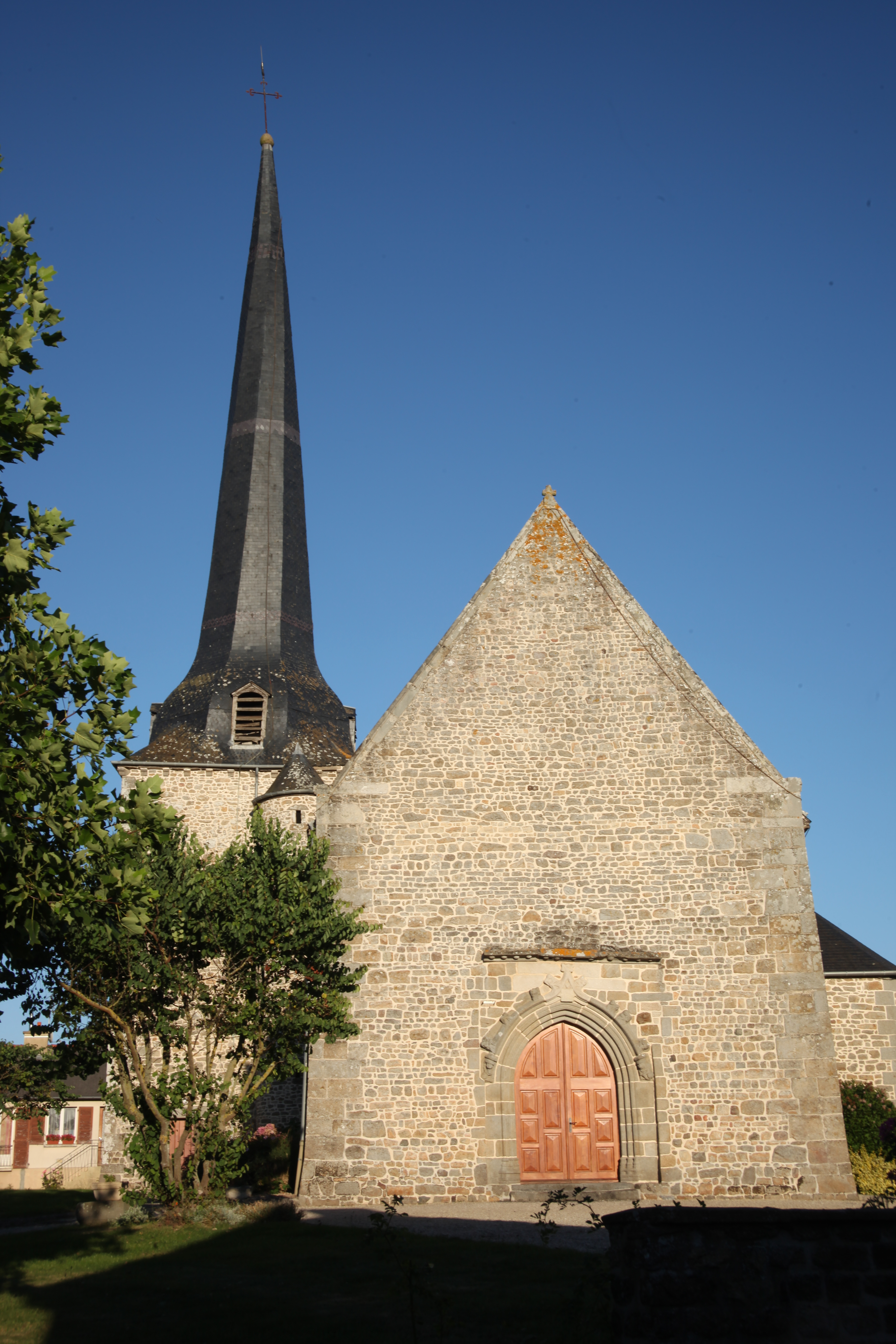
- The church of Saint-Pierre, in Québriac

- Coat of arms
- Location of Québriac
- Location within France Location within Brittany
- Coordinates: 48°20′44″N 1°49′32″W
- Country: France
- Region: Brittany
- Department: Ille-et-Vilaine
- Arrondissement: Saint-Malo
- Canton: Combourg
- Intercommunality: Bretagne Romantique

Government
  - Mayor (2020–2026): Marie-Madeleine Gamblin
- Area^{1}: 20.72 km^{2} (8.00 sq mi)
- Highest elevation: 96 m (315 ft)
- Lowest elevation: 22 m (72 ft)
- Population (2023): 1,588
  - Density: 76.64/km^{2} (198.5/sq mi)
- Time zone: UTC+01:00 (CET)
  - Summer (DST): UTC+02:00 (CEST)
- INSEE/Postal code: 35233 /35190
- ^{1} French Land Register data, which excludes lakes, ponds, glaciers > 1 km^{2} (0.386 sq mi or 247 acres) and river estuaries.

Québriac (French pronunciation: [kebʁijak]; Breton: Kevrieg; Gallo: Cóberiac) is a commune in the Ille-et-Vilaine department in Brittany in northwestern France.

== Population ==
Inhabitants of Québriac are called Québriacois in French.

Historical population
Year	Pop.	±% p.a.
1968	794	—
1975	686	−2.07%
1982	837	+2.88%
1990	888	+0.74%
1999	1,040	+1.77%
2007	1,378	+3.58%
2012	1,525	+2.05%
2017	1,579	+0.70%
2023	1,588	+0.09%
Source: INSEE

== See also ==
- Communes of the Ille-et-Vilaine department
