= Trévérien =

Trévérien Treverian (Breton)
- Commune
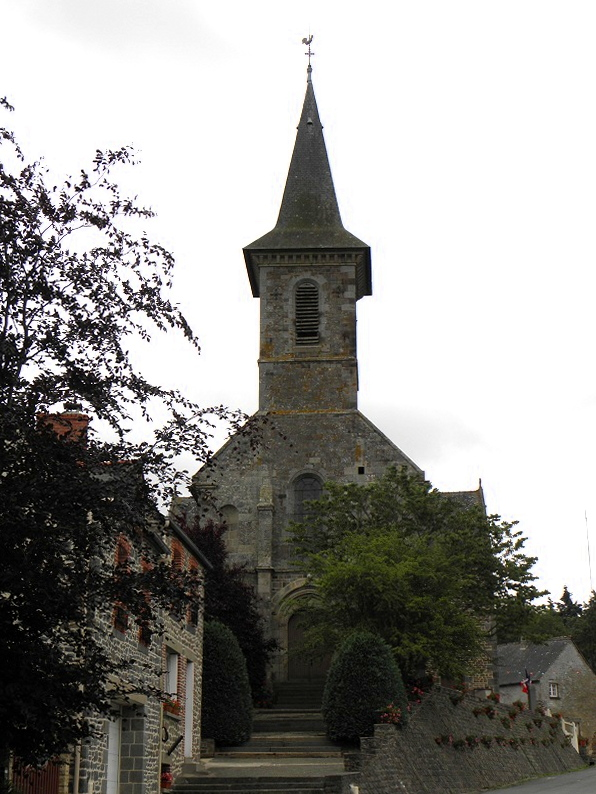
- The church in Trévérien
- Location of Trévérien
- Location within France Location within Brittany
- Coordinates: 48°22′18″N 1°55′37″W
- Country: France
- Region: Brittany
- Department: Ille-et-Vilaine
- Arrondissement: Saint-Malo
- Canton: Combourg
- Intercommunality: CC Bretagne Romantique

Government
  - Mayor (2020–2026): Vincent Melcion
- Area^{1}: 12.08 km^{2} (4.66 sq mi)
- Highest elevation: 68 m (223 ft)
- Lowest elevation: 13 m (43 ft)
- Population (2023): 918
  - Density: 76.0/km^{2} (197/sq mi)
- Time zone: UTC+01:00 (CET)
  - Summer (DST): UTC+02:00 (CEST)
- INSEE/Postal code: 35345 /35190
- ^{1} French Land Register data, which excludes lakes, ponds, glaciers > 1 km^{2} (0.386 sq mi or 247 acres) and river estuaries.

Trévérien (French pronunciation: [tʁeveʁjɛ̃]; Breton: Treverian) is a commune in the Ille-et-Vilaine department of Brittany in northwestern France.

== Population ==
Inhabitants of Trévérien are called Trévérienais in French.

Historical population
Year	Pop.	±% p.a.
1968	577	—
1975	520	−1.47%
1982	476	−1.26%
1990	487	+0.29%
1999	524	+0.82%
2007	750	+4.58%
2012	884	+3.34%
2017	884	+0.00%
2023	918	+0.63%
Source: INSEE

== Personalities ==
- Henri Pinault, Roman Catholic Bishop of Chengdu, born in Trévérien in 1904

== See also ==
- Communes of the Ille-et-Vilaine department
