= Saint-Broladre =

Saint-Broladre Sant-Brewalaer (Breton)
- Commune
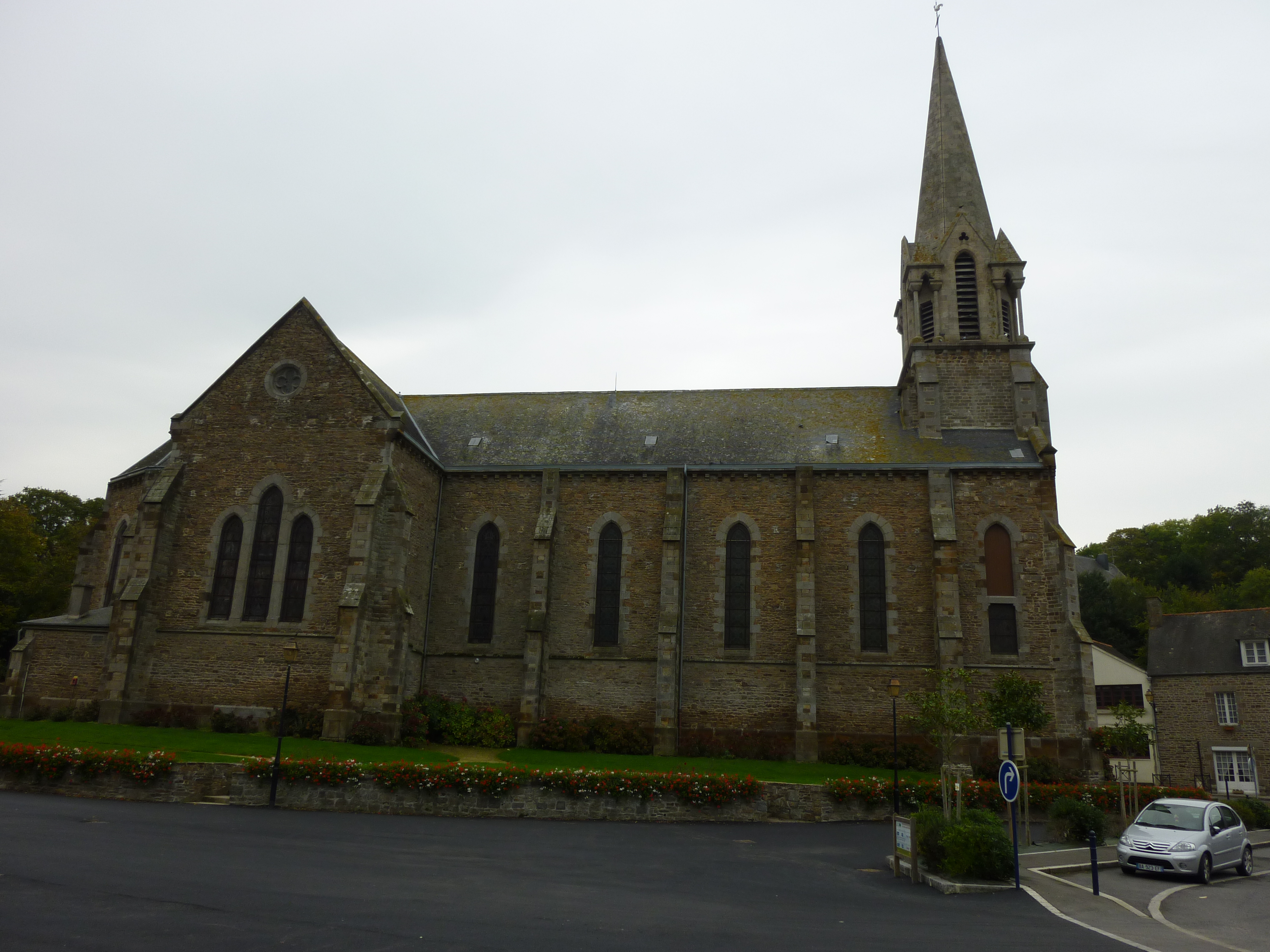
- The church of Saint-Broladre

- Coat of arms
- Location of Saint-Broladre
- Location within France Location within Brittany
- Coordinates: 48°35′15″N 1°39′19″W
- Country: France
- Region: Brittany
- Department: Ille-et-Vilaine
- Arrondissement: Saint-Malo
- Canton: Dol-de-Bretagne
- Intercommunality: Pays de Dol et Baie du Mont Saint-Michel

Government
  - Mayor (2020–2026): Jean-François Gobichon
- Area^{1}: 23.81 km^{2} (9.19 sq mi)
- Highest elevation: 102 m (335 ft)
- Lowest elevation: 1 m (3.3 ft)
- Population (2023): 1,153
  - Density: 48.43/km^{2} (125.4/sq mi)
- Time zone: UTC+01:00 (CET)
  - Summer (DST): UTC+02:00 (CEST)
- INSEE/Postal code: 35259 /35120
- ^{1} French Land Register data, which excludes lakes, ponds, glaciers > 1 km^{2} (0.386 sq mi or 247 acres) and river estuaries.

Saint-Broladre (French pronunciation: [sɛ̃ bʁɔladʁ]; Breton: Sant-Brewalaer) is a commune in the Ille-et-Vilaine department in Brittany in northwestern France.

== Population ==
Inhabitants of Saint-Broladre are called Broladrais or Broladriens in French.

Historical population
Year	Pop.	±% p.a.
1968	946	—
1975	881	−1.01%
1982	865	−0.26%
1990	992	+1.73%
1999	1,014	+0.24%
2007	1,039	+0.30%
2012	1,142	+1.91%
2017	1,132	−0.18%
2023	1,153	+0.31%
Source: INSEE

== See also ==
- Communes of the Ille-et-Vilaine department
