= Baguer-Morvan =

Baguer-Morvan Bayér-Morvan (Gallo) Bagar-Morvan (Breton)
- Commune
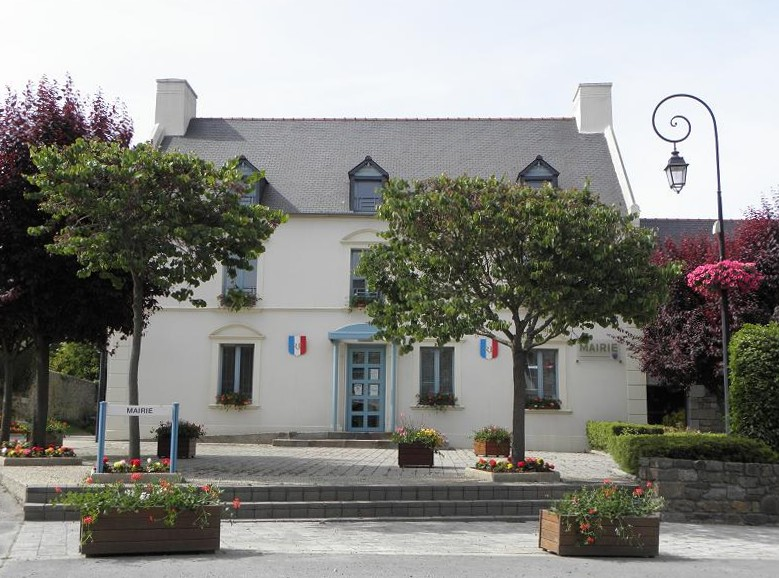
- Town hall

- Coat of arms
- Location of Baguer-Morvan
- Location within France Location within Brittany
- Coordinates: 48°31′33″N 1°46′21″W
- Country: France
- Region: Brittany
- Department: Ille-et-Vilaine
- Arrondissement: Saint-Malo
- Canton: Dol-de-Bretagne
- Intercommunality: Pays de Dol et Baie du Mont Saint-Michel

Government
  - Mayor (2020–2026): Olivier Bourdais
- Area^{1}: 23.11 km^{2} (8.92 sq mi)
- Highest elevation: 87 m (285 ft)
- Lowest elevation: 15 m (49 ft)
- Population (2023): 1,702
  - Density: 73.65/km^{2} (190.7/sq mi)
- Time zone: UTC+01:00 (CET)
  - Summer (DST): UTC+02:00 (CEST)
- INSEE/Postal code: 35009 /35120
- Website: baguer-morvan.fr
- ^{1} French Land Register data, which excludes lakes, ponds, glaciers > 1 km^{2} (0.386 sq mi or 247 acres) and river estuaries.

Baguer-Morvan (French pronunciation: [baɡɛʁ mɔʁvɑ̃]; Breton: Bagar-Morvan; Gallo: Bayér-Morvan) is a commune in the Ille-et-Vilaine department in Brittany in northwestern France.

== Population ==
Historical population
Year	Pop.	±% p.a.
1968	1,150	—
1975	1,326	+2.06%
1982	1,347	+0.22%
1990	1,306	−0.39%
1999	1,337	+0.26%
2007	1,499	+1.44%
2012	1,595	+1.25%
2017	1,705	+1.34%
2023	1,702	−0.03%
Source: INSEE

Inhabitants of Baguer-Morvan are called Baguerrois in French.

== See also ==
- Communes of the Ille-et-Vilaine department
