= Lourmais =

Lourmais L’Oumàe (Gallo) An Oulmeg (Breton)
- Commune
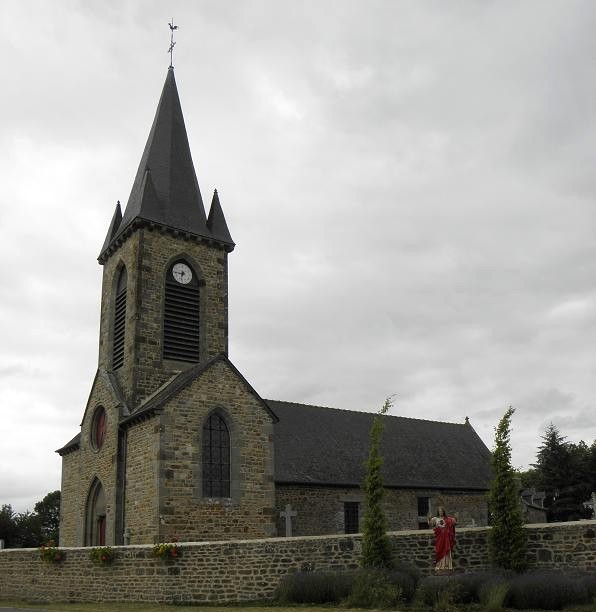
- The church of Sainte-Anne, in Lourmais
- Location of Lourmais
- Location within France Location within Brittany
- Coordinates: 48°27′02″N 1°43′35″W
- Country: France
- Region: Brittany
- Department: Ille-et-Vilaine
- Arrondissement: Saint-Malo
- Canton: Combourg
- Intercommunality: CC Bretagne Romantique

Government
  - Mayor (2020–2026): François Bordin
- Area^{1}: 7.22 km^{2} (2.79 sq mi)
- Highest elevation: 111 m (364 ft)
- Lowest elevation: 60 m (200 ft)
- Population (2023): 340
  - Density: 47/km^{2} (120/sq mi)
- Time zone: UTC+01:00 (CET)
  - Summer (DST): UTC+02:00 (CEST)
- INSEE/Postal code: 35159 /35270
- ^{1} French Land Register data, which excludes lakes, ponds, glaciers > 1 km^{2} (0.386 sq mi or 247 acres) and river estuaries.

Lourmais (French pronunciation: [luʁmɛ]; Gallo: L’Oumàe, Breton: An Oulmeg) is a commune in the Ille-et-Vilaine department of Brittany in northwestern France.

== Population ==
Inhabitants of Lourmais are called Lourmaisiens in French.

Historical population
Year	Pop.	±% p.a.
1968	262	—
1975	261	−0.05%
1982	263	+0.11%
1990	274	+0.51%
1999	251	−0.97%
2007	305	+2.47%
2012	341	+2.26%
2017	326	−0.90%
2023	340	+0.70%
Source: INSEE

== See also ==
- Communes of the Ille-et-Vilaine department
