= Saint-Domineuc =

Saint-Domineuc Landoveneg (Breton)
- Commune
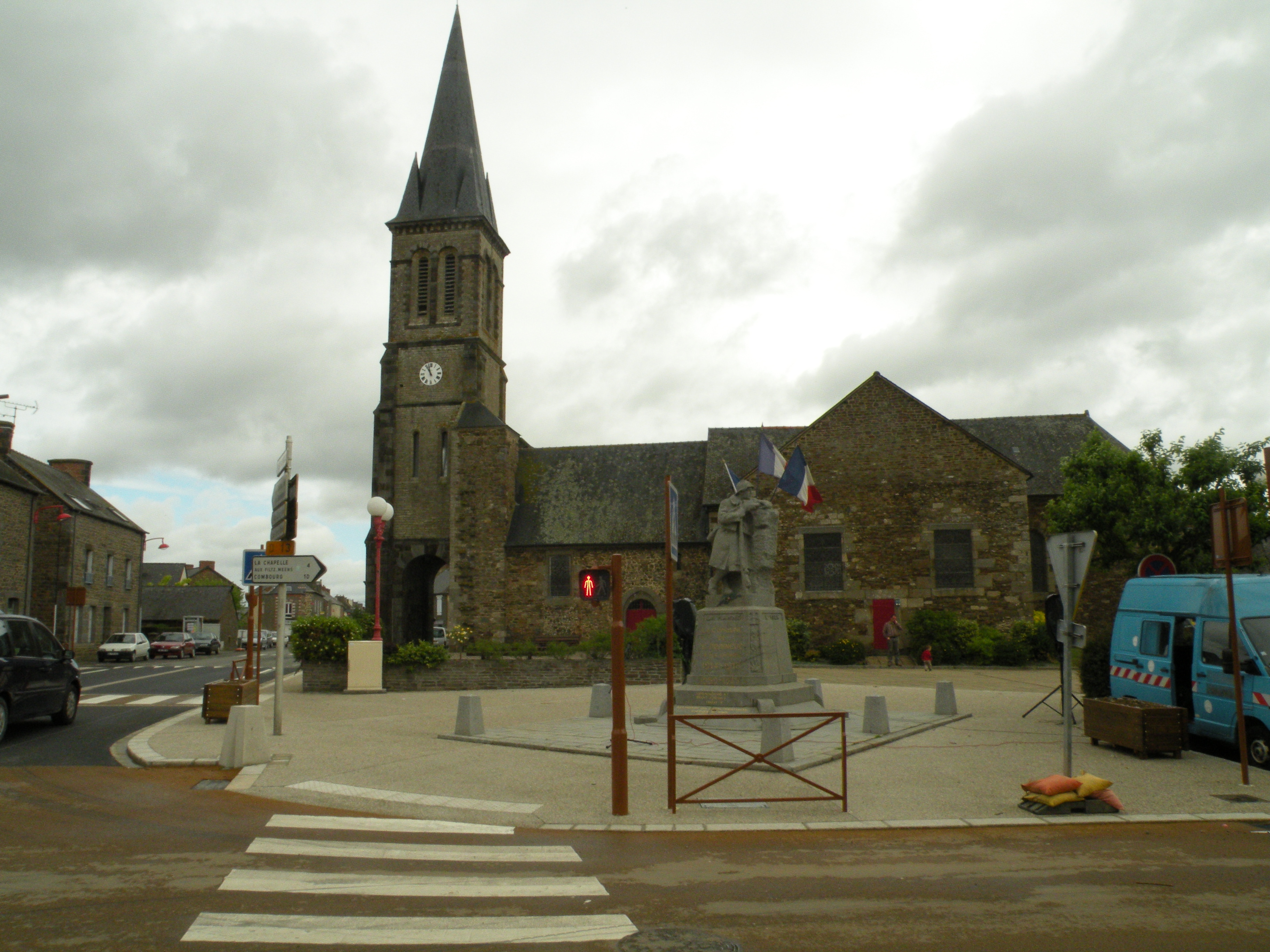
- The church of Saint-Domineuc
- Location of Saint-Domineuc
- Location within France Location within Brittany
- Coordinates: 48°22′30″N 1°52′30″W
- Country: France
- Region: Brittany
- Department: Ille-et-Vilaine
- Arrondissement: Saint-Malo
- Canton: Combourg
- Intercommunality: Bretagne Romantique

Government
  - Mayor (2020–2026): Benoît Sohier
- Area^{1}: 15.70 km^{2} (6.06 sq mi)
- Highest elevation: 90 m (300 ft)
- Lowest elevation: 17 m (56 ft)
- Population (2023): 2,619
  - Density: 166.8/km^{2} (432.0/sq mi)
- Time zone: UTC+01:00 (CET)
  - Summer (DST): UTC+02:00 (CEST)
- INSEE/Postal code: 35265 /35190
- ^{1} French Land Register data, which excludes lakes, ponds, glaciers > 1 km^{2} (0.386 sq mi or 247 acres) and river estuaries.

Saint-Domineuc (French pronunciation: [sɛ̃ dɔminøk]; Breton: Landoveneg) is a commune in the Ille-et-Vilaine département in Brittany in northwestern France.

== Population ==
Inhabitants of Saint-Domineuc are called docmaëliens in French.

Historical population
Year	Pop.	±% p.a.
1968	1,013	—
1975	1,127	+1.54%
1982	1,333	+2.43%
1990	1,339	+0.06%
1999	1,437	+0.79%
2007	2,037	+4.46%
2012	2,395	+3.29%
2017	2,532	+1.12%
2023	2,619	+0.56%
Source: INSEE

== See also ==
- Communes of the Ille-et-Vilaine department
