= Sains, Ille-et-Vilaine =

Sains Saent (Gallo) Sent (Breton)
- Commune
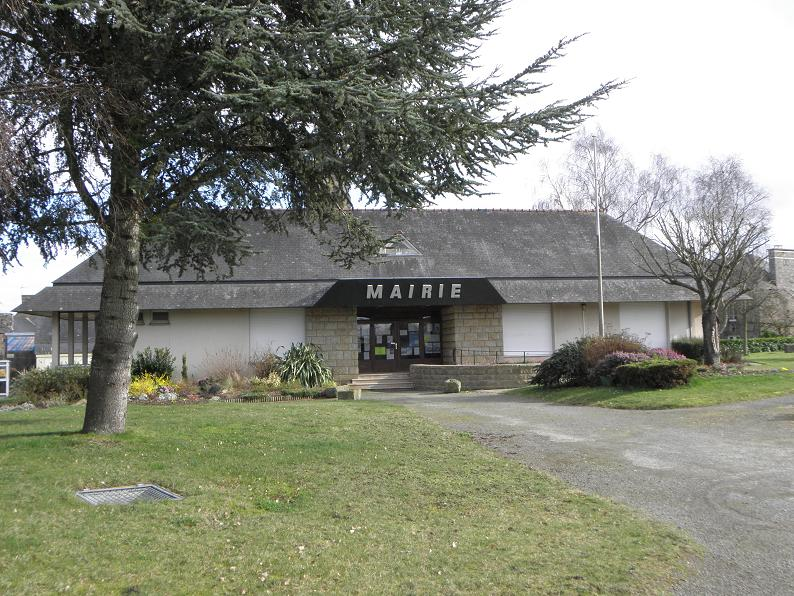
- The town hall of Sains
- Location of Sains
- Location within France Location within Brittany
- Coordinates: 48°33′07″N 1°34′59″W
- Country: France
- Region: Brittany
- Department: Ille-et-Vilaine
- Arrondissement: Saint-Malo
- Canton: Dol-de-Bretagne
- Intercommunality: Pays de Dol et Baie du Mont Saint-Michel

Government
  - Mayor (2020–2026): Nicolas Bathellier
- Area^{1}: 10.25 km^{2} (3.96 sq mi)
- Highest elevation: 96 m (315 ft)
- Lowest elevation: 19 m (62 ft)
- Population (2023): 468
  - Density: 45.7/km^{2} (118/sq mi)
- Time zone: UTC+01:00 (CET)
  - Summer (DST): UTC+02:00 (CEST)
- INSEE/Postal code: 35248 /35610
- ^{1} French Land Register data, which excludes lakes, ponds, glaciers > 1 km^{2} (0.386 sq mi or 247 acres) and river estuaries.

Sains (Gallo: Saent, Breton: Sent) is a commune in the Ille-et-Vilaine department in Brittany in northwestern France.

== History ==
Treaties between France and England placed Brittany under English rule. In 1402 the French and English were getting along a little better, after many decades of disputes in 1518 a treaty was signed giving England ownership of Brittany, hostages were handed over by the French as a guarantee that the treaty would be honoured.

The Lords of Sains in Brittany were party to many of the meetings and discussions, and involved in agreeing terms. Whilst the agreements were made Brittany was still disputed for many years later and eventually fell back into French hands.

1402 September 19 - Letters of the King of France, appointing Lancelot de Longvilliers, sire d'Engoudsent, his Chamberlain and Jehan de Sains, Chancellor of Amiens, his secretary, to treat with the envoys of Henry IV: Corbeil (addressed to Henry IV's envoys)

1521 February 4 - Powers by Francis, King of France, to John de Sains, Lord of Marigny, to arrange for the exchange of four out of the eight hostages surrendered to Henry VIII. in accordance with the treaty of 8 October 1518, four having been already released. Romorantin.

== Population ==
Historical population
Year	Pop.	±% p.a.
1968	569	—
1975	628	+1.42%
1982	667	+0.86%
1990	569	−1.97%
1999	504	−1.34%
2007	482	−0.56%
2012	486	+0.17%
2017	483	−0.12%
2023	468	−0.52%
Source: INSEE

Inhabitants of Sains are called sainsois in French.

== Geography ==
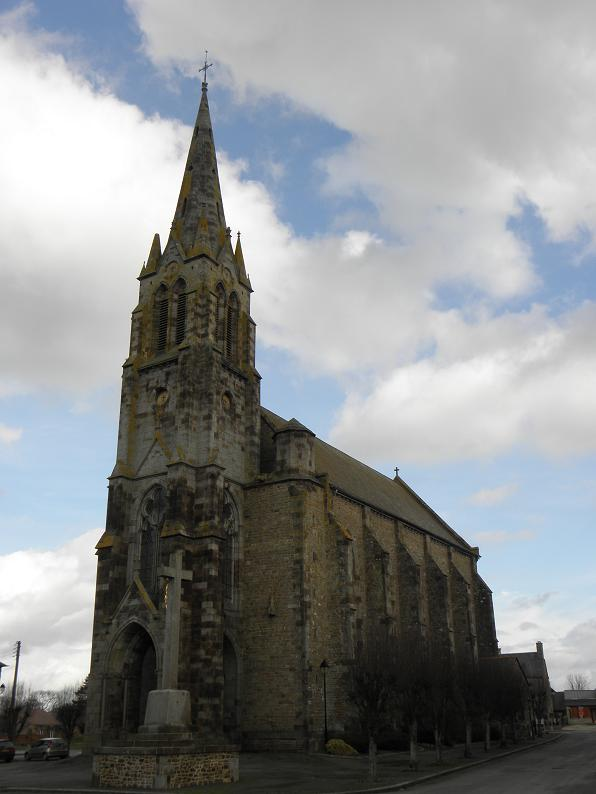
St Peter's church

- The Église Saint-Pierre is in the Gothic revival style; it was mainly built between 1861 and 1868 by Jean-Gabriel Frangeul to the designs of Eugène Hawke. The tower and spire are the work of Alfred-Louis Frangeul (his son), 1893-1894.
- The Étang du Bourg, a mesotrophic pond

== See also ==
- Communes of the Ille-et-Vilaine department
