= Sougeal =

Sougeal Sougéal (Gallo) Sulial (Breton)
- Commune
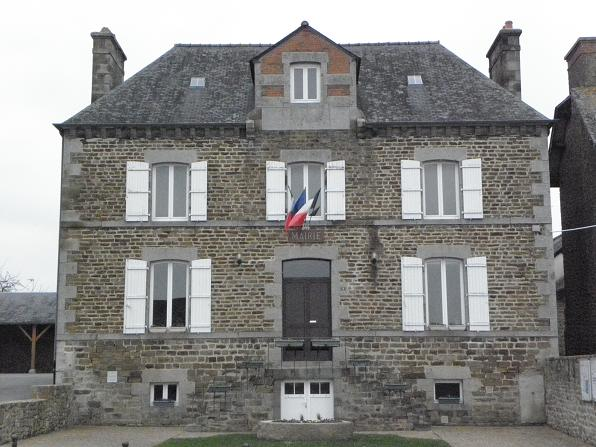
- The town hall of Sougeal

- Coat of arms
- Location of Sougeal
- Location within France Location within Brittany
- Coordinates: 48°30′38″N 1°31′18″W
- Country: France
- Region: Brittany
- Department: Ille-et-Vilaine
- Arrondissement: Saint-Malo
- Canton: Dol-de-Bretagne

Government
  - Mayor (2020–2026): Rémi Chapdelaine
- Area^{1}: 14.15 km^{2} (5.46 sq mi)
- Highest elevation: 104 m (341 ft)
- Lowest elevation: 5 m (16 ft)
- Population (2023): 547
  - Density: 38.7/km^{2} (100/sq mi)
- Time zone: UTC+01:00 (CET)
  - Summer (DST): UTC+02:00 (CEST)
- INSEE/Postal code: 35329 /35610
- ^{1} French Land Register data, which excludes lakes, ponds, glaciers > 1 km^{2} (0.386 sq mi or 247 acres) and river estuaries.

Sougeal (before 2022: Sougéal; Breton: Sulial; Gallo: Sougéal) is a commune in the Ille-et-Vilaine department in Brittany in northwestern France.

== Population ==
Inhabitants of Sougeal are called Sougelais in French.

Historical population
Year	Pop.	±% p.a.
1968	703	—
1975	687	−0.33%
1982	618	−1.50%
1990	626	+0.16%
1999	586	−0.73%
2007	609	+0.48%
2012	654	+1.44%
2017	570	−2.71%
2023	547	−0.68%
Source: INSEE

== See also ==
- Communes of the Ille-et-Vilaine department
