= Trémeheuc =

Trémeheuc Tréméhoec (Gallo) Tramaeg (Breton)
- Commune
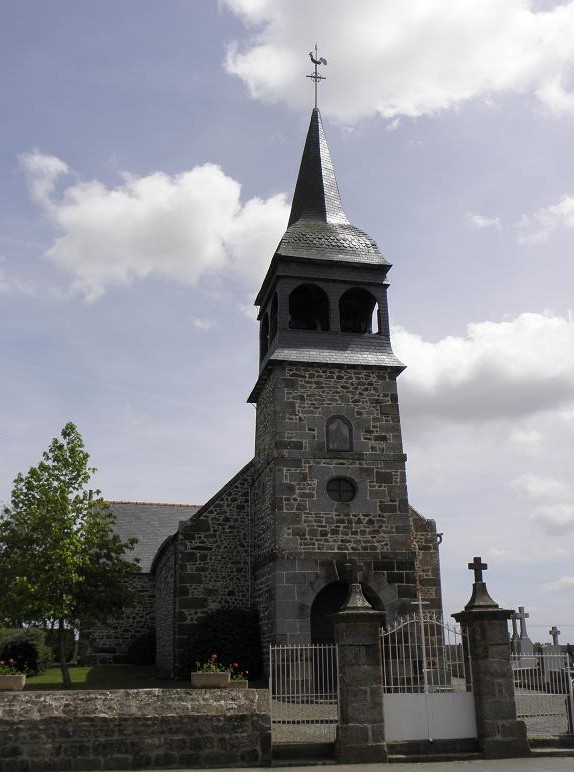
- The church in Trémeheuc
- Location of Trémeheuc
- Location within France Location within Brittany
- Coordinates: 48°25′35″N 1°42′07″W
- Country: France
- Region: Brittany
- Department: Ille-et-Vilaine
- Arrondissement: Saint-Malo
- Canton: Combourg
- Intercommunality: Bretagne Romantique

Government
  - Mayor (2020–2026): Pierre Sorais
- Area^{1}: 6.05 km^{2} (2.34 sq mi)
- Highest elevation: 127 m (417 ft)
- Lowest elevation: 69 m (226 ft)
- Population (2023): 355
  - Density: 58.7/km^{2} (152/sq mi)
- Time zone: UTC+01:00 (CET)
  - Summer (DST): UTC+02:00 (CEST)
- INSEE/Postal code: 35342 /35270
- ^{1} French Land Register data, which excludes lakes, ponds, glaciers > 1 km^{2} (0.386 sq mi or 247 acres) and river estuaries.

Trémeheuc (French pronunciation: [tʁemə.øk]; Gallo: Tréméhoec, Breton: Tremaeg) is a commune in the Ille-et-Vilaine department in Brittany in northwestern France.

== Population ==
Inhabitants of Trémeheuc are called Trémeheucois in French.

Historical population
Year	Pop.	±% p.a.
1968	219	—
1975	232	+0.83%
1982	286	+3.03%
1990	308	+0.93%
1999	313	+0.18%
2007	343	+1.15%
2012	363	+1.14%
2017	343	−1.13%
2023	355	+0.57%
Source: INSEE

== See also ==
- Communes of the Ille-et-Vilaine department
