= Communes of the Ille-et-Vilaine department =

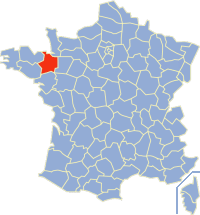

The following is a list of the 332 communes of the Ille-et-Vilaine department of France.

The communes cooperate in the following intercommunalities (as of 2025):

- Rennes Métropole
- CA Fougères Agglomération
- Communauté d'agglomération du Pays de Saint-Malo
- CA Redon Agglomération (partly)
- CA Vitré Communauté
- CC Bretagne Porte de Loire Communauté
- Communauté de communes Bretagne Romantique
- Communauté de communes de Brocéliande
- Communauté de communes Côte d'Émeraude (partly)
- Communauté de communes Couesnon Marches de Bretagne
- CC Liffré-Cormier Communauté
- CC Montfort Communauté
- Communauté de communes du Pays de Châteaugiron
- Communauté de communes du Pays de Dol et de la Baie du Mont Saint-Michel
- CC Roche aux Fées Communauté
- Communauté de communes de Saint-Méen Montauban
- Communauté de communes du Val d'Ille-Aubigné
- CC Vallons de Haute-Bretagne Communauté

| INSEE | Postal | Commune |
|---|---|---|
| 35001 | 35690 | Acigné |
| 35002 | 35150 | Amanlis |
| 35003 | 35250 | Andouillé-Neuville |
| 35005 | 35130 | Arbrissel |
| 35006 | 35370 | Argentré-du-Plessis |
| 35007 | 35250 | Aubigné |
| 35008 | 35130 | Availles-sur-Seiche |
| 35009 | 35120 | Baguer-Morvan |
| 35010 | 35120 | Baguer-Pican |
| 35012 | 35470 | Bain-de-Bretagne |
| 35013 | 35600 | Bains-sur-Oust |
| 35014 | 35680 | Bais |
| 35015 | 35500 | Balazé |
| 35016 | 35580 | Baulon |
| 35017 | 35190 | La Baussaine |
| 35018 | 35420 | La Bazouge-du-Désert |
| 35019 | 35560 | Bazouges-la-Pérouse |
| 35021 | 35133 | Beaucé |
| 35022 | 35190 | Bécherel |
| 35023 | 35137 | Bédée |
| 35024 | 35830 | Betton |
| 35025 | 35133 | Billé |
| 35026 | 35750 | Bléruais |
| 35027 | 35360 | Boisgervilly |
| 35028 | 35150 | Boistrudan |
| 35029 | 35270 | Bonnemain |
| 35030 | 35320 | La Bosse-de-Bretagne |
| 35031 | 35340 | La Bouëxière |
| 35032 | 35230 | Bourgbarré |
| 35033 | 35890 | Bourg-des-Comptes |
| 35034 | 35120 | La Boussac |
| 35035 | 35330 | Bovel |
| 35037 | 35310 | Bréal-sous-Montfort |
| 35038 | 35370 | Bréal-sous-Vitré |
| 35039 | 35530 | Brécé |
| 35040 | 35160 | Breteil |
| 35041 | 35150 | Brie |
| 35042 | 35370 | Brielles |
| 35044 | 35120 | Broualan |
| 35045 | 35550 | Bruc-sur-Aff |
| 35046 | 35330 | Les Brulais |
| 35047 | 35170 | Bruz |
| 35049 | 35260 | Cancale |
| 35050 | 35190 | Cardroc |
| 35051 | 35510 | Cesson-Sévigné |
| 35052 | 35500 | Champeaux |
| 35054 | 35150 | Chanteloup |
| 35055 | 35135 | Chantepie |
| 35056 | 35190 | La Chapelle-aux-Filtzméens |
| 35057 | 35330 | La Chapelle-Bouëxic |
| 35058 | 35630 | La Chapelle-Chaussée |
| 35064 | 35660 | La Chapelle-de-Brain |
| 35059 | 35520 | La Chapelle-des-Fougeretz |
| 35060 | 35360 | La Chapelle-du-Lou-du-Lac |
| 35061 | 35500 | La Chapelle-Erbrée |
| 35062 | 35133 | La Chapelle-Fleurigné |
| 35063 | 35140 | La Chapelle-Saint-Aubert |
| 35065 | 35590 | La Chapelle-Thouarault |
| 35066 | 35131 | Chartres-de-Bretagne |
| 35067 | 35250 | Chasné-sur-Illet |
| 35068 | 35220 | Châteaubourg |
| 35069 | 35410 | Châteaugiron |
| 35070 | 35430 | Châteauneuf-d'Ille-et-Vilaine |
| 35071 | 35133 | Le Châtellier |
| 35072 | 35210 | Châtillon-en-Vendelais |
| 35075 | 35490 | Chauvigné |
| 35076 | 35310 | Chavagne |
| 35077 | 35640 | Chelun |
| 35078 | 35120 | Cherrueix |
| 35079 | 35250 | Chevaigné |
| 35080 | 35310 | Cintré |
| 35081 | 35590 | Clayes |
| 35082 | 35134 | Coësmes |
| 35084 | 35330 | Comblessac |
| 35085 | 35270 | Combourg |
| 35086 | 35210 | Combourtillé |
| 35087 | 35500 | Cornillé |
| 35088 | 35150 | Corps-Nuds |
| 35089 | 35320 | La Couyère |
| 35090 | 35320 | Crevin |
| 35091 | 35290 | Le Crouais |
| 35092 | 35270 | Cuguen |
| 35093 | 35800 | Dinard |
| 35094 | 35440 | Dingé |
| 35095 | 35120 | Dol-de-Bretagne |
| 35096 | 35113 | Domagné |
| 35097 | 35680 | Domalain |
| 35098 | 35390 | La Dominelais |
| 35099 | 35410 | Domloup |
| 35101 | 35450 | Dourdain |
| 35102 | 35130 | Drouges |
| 35103 | 35640 | Eancé |
| 35104 | 35120 | Epiniac |
| 35105 | 35500 | Erbrée |
| 35106 | 35620 | Ercé-en-Lamée |
| 35107 | 35340 | Ercé-près-Liffré |
| 35108 | 35150 | Essé |
| 35109 | 35370 | Étrelles |
| 35110 | 35440 | Feins |
| 35111 | 35420 | Le Ferré |
| 35114 | 35640 | Forges-la-Forêt |
| 35115 | 35300 | Fougères |
| 35116 | 35111 | La Fresnais |
| 35117 | 35290 | Gaël |
| 35118 | 35490 | Gahard |
| 35119 | 35370 | Gennes-sur-Seiche |
| 35120 | 35850 | Gévezé |
| 35121 | 35140 | Gosné |
| 35122 | 35350 | La Gouesnière |
| 35123 | 35580 | Goven |
| 35124 | 35390 | Grand-Fougeray |
| 35125 | 35130 | La Guerche-de-Bretagne |
| 35126 | 35580 | Guichen |
| 35127 | 35580 | Guignen |
| 35128 | 35440 | Guipel |
| 35176 | 35480 | Guipry-Messac |
| 35130 | 35630 | Hédé-Bazouges |
| 35131 | 35590 | L'Hermitage |
| 35132 | 35120 | Hirel |
| 35133 | 35750 | Iffendic |
| 35134 | 35630 | Les Iffs |
| 35135 | 35850 | Irodouër |
| 35136 | 35150 | Janzé |
| 35137 | 35133 | Javené |
| 35138 | 35133 | Laignelet |
| 35139 | 35890 | Laillé |
| 35140 | 35320 | Lalleu |
| 35141 | 35450 | Landavran |
| 35142 | 35133 | Landéan |
| 35143 | 35360 | Landujan |
| 35144 | 35850 | Langan |
| 35145 | 35660 | Langon |
| 35146 | 35630 | Langouet |
| 35148 | 35270 | Lanrigan |
| 35149 | 35580 | Lassy |
| 35150 | 35133 | Lécousse |
| 35151 | 35550 | Lieuron |
| 35152 | 35340 | Liffré |
| 35153 | 35111 | Lillemer |
| 35154 | 35450 | Livré-sur-Changeon |
| 35155 | 35550 | Lohéac |
| 35156 | 35190 | Longaulnay |
| 35157 | 35133 | Le Loroux |
| 35159 | 35270 | Lourmais |
| 35160 | 35330 | Loutehel |
| 35161 | 35680 | Louvigné-de-Bais |
| 35162 | 35420 | Louvigné-du-Désert |
| 35163 | 35133 | Luitré-Dompierre |
| 35257 | 35460 | Maen Roch |
| 35164 | 35560 | Marcillé-Raoul |
| 35165 | 35240 | Marcillé-Robert |
| 35166 | 35220 | Marpiré |
| 35167 | 35640 | Martigné-Ferchaud |
| 35169 | 35380 | Maxent |
| 35170 | 35450 | Mecé |
| 35171 | 35360 | Médréac |
| 35172 | 35270 | Meillac |
| 35173 | 35520 | Melesse |
| 35174 | 35420 | Mellé |
| 35175 | 35330 | Mernel |
| 35308 | 35720 | Mesnil-Roc'h |
| 35177 | 35520 | La Mézière |
| 35178 | 35140 | Mézières-sur-Couesnon |
| 35179 | 35540 | Miniac-Morvan |
| 35180 | 35190 | Miniac-sous-Bécherel |
| 35181 | 35870 | Le Minihic-sur-Rance |
| 35183 | 35370 | Mondevert |

| INSEE | Postal | Commune |
|---|---|---|
| 35184 | 35360 | Montauban-de-Bretagne |
| 35185 | 35210 | Montautour |
| 35186 | 35120 | Mont-Dol |
| 35187 | 35160 | Monterfil |
| 35188 | 35160 | Montfort-sur-Meu |
| 35189 | 35760 | Montgermont |
| 35190 | 35420 | Monthault |
| 35192 | 35210 | Montreuil-des-Landes |
| 35193 | 35520 | Montreuil-le-Gast |
| 35194 | 35500 | Montreuil-sous-Pérouse |
| 35195 | 35440 | Montreuil-sur-Ille |
| 35196 | 35310 | Mordelles |
| 35197 | 35250 | Mouazé |
| 35198 | 35680 | Moulins |
| 35199 | 35130 | Moussé |
| 35200 | 35130 | Moutiers |
| 35201 | 35290 | Muel |
| 35202 | 35470 | La Noë-Blanche |
| 35203 | 35137 | La Nouaye |
| 35204 | 35410 | Nouvoitou |
| 35206 | 35230 | Noyal-Châtillon-sur-Seiche |
| 35205 | 35560 | Noyal-sous-Bazouges |
| 35207 | 35530 | Noyal-sur-Vilaine |
| 35208 | 35230 | Orgères |
| 35210 | 35740 | Pacé |
| 35211 | 35380 | Paimpont |
| 35212 | 35320 | Pancé |
| 35214 | 35210 | Parcé |
| 35215 | 35133 | Parigné |
| 35216 | 35850 | Parthenay-de-Bretagne |
| 35217 | 35370 | Le Pertre |
| 35218 | 35320 | Le Petit-Fougeray |
| 35219 | 35550 | Pipriac |
| 35220 | 35150 | Piré-Chancé |
| 35221 | 35470 | Pléchâtel |
| 35222 | 35610 | Pleine-Fougères |
| 35223 | 35380 | Plélan-le-Grand |
| 35224 | 35540 | Plerguer |
| 35225 | 35720 | Plesder |
| 35226 | 35720 | Pleugueneuc |
| 35227 | 35137 | Pleumeleuc |
| 35228 | 35730 | Pleurtuit |
| 35229 | 35500 | Pocé-les-Bois |
| 35230 | 35420 | Poilley |
| 35231 | 35320 | Poligné |
| 35363 | 35131 | Pont-Péan |
| 35191 | 35460 | Les Portes du Coglais |
| 35232 | 35210 | Princé |
| 35233 | 35190 | Québriac |
| 35234 | 35290 | Quédillac |
| 35235 | 35130 | Rannée |
| 35236 | 35600 | Redon |
| 35237 | 35660 | Renac |
| 35238 | 35000 | Rennes |
| 35239 | 35240 | Retiers |
| 35240 | 35650 | Le Rheu |
| 35241 | 35780 | La Richardais |
| 35242 | 35560 | Rimou |
| 35282 | 35140 | Rives-du-Couesnon |
| 35243 | 35133 | Romagné |
| 35244 | 35490 | Romazy |
| 35245 | 35850 | Romillé |
| 35246 | 35120 | Roz-Landrieux |
| 35247 | 35610 | Roz-sur-Couesnon |
| 35248 | 35610 | Sains |
| 35250 | 35230 | Saint-Armel |
| 35251 | 35250 | Saint-Aubin-d'Aubigné |
| 35252 | 35500 | Saint-Aubin-des-Landes |
| 35253 | 35140 | Saint-Aubin-du-Cormier |
| 35255 | 35114 | Saint-Benoît-des-Ondes |
| 35256 | 35800 | Saint-Briac-sur-Mer |
| 35258 | 35630 | Saint-Brieuc-des-Iffs |
| 35259 | 35120 | Saint-Broladre |
| 35260 | 35210 | Saint-Christophe-des-Bois |
| 35261 | 35140 | Saint-Christophe-de-Valains |
| 35263 | 35350 | Saint-Coulomb |
| 35264 | 35220 | Saint-Didier |
| 35265 | 35190 | Saint-Domineuc |
| 35249 | 35390 | Sainte-Anne-sur-Vilaine |
| 35262 | 35134 | Sainte-Colombe |
| 35294 | 35600 | Sainte-Marie |
| 35266 | 35230 | Saint-Erblon |
| 35268 | 35550 | Saint-Ganton |
| 35270 | 35610 | Saint-Georges-de-Gréhaigne |
| 35271 | 35420 | Saint-Georges-de-Reintembault |
| 35272 | 35370 | Saint-Germain-du-Pinel |
| 35273 | 35133 | Saint-Germain-en-Coglès |
| 35274 | 35250 | Saint-Germain-sur-Ille |
| 35275 | 35590 | Saint-Gilles |
| 35276 | 35630 | Saint-Gondran |
| 35277 | 35750 | Saint-Gonlay |
| 35278 | 35760 | Saint-Grégoire |
| 35279 | 35430 | Saint-Guinoux |
| 35280 | 35140 | Saint-Hilaire-des-Landes |
| 35281 | 35136 | Saint-Jacques-de-la-Lande |
| 35283 | 35220 | Saint-Jean-sur-Vilaine |
| 35284 | 35430 | Saint-Jouan-des-Guérets |
| 35285 | 35550 | Saint-Just |
| 35286 | 35270 | Saint-Léger-des-Prés |
| 35287 | 35800 | Saint-Lunaire |
| 35288 | 35400 | Saint-Malo |
| 35289 | 35480 | Saint-Malo-de-Phily |
| 35290 | 35750 | Saint-Malon-sur-Mel |
| 35291 | 35120 | Saint-Marcan |
| 35292 | 35460 | Saint-Marc-le-Blanc |
| 35295 | 35750 | Saint-Maugan |
| 35296 | 35250 | Saint-Médard-sur-Ille |
| 35297 | 35290 | Saint-Méen-le-Grand |
| 35299 | 35350 | Saint-Méloir-des-Ondes |
| 35300 | 35500 | Saint-M'Hervé |
| 35302 | 35290 | Saint-Onen-la-Chapelle |
| 35304 | 35140 | Saint-Ouen-des-Alleux |
| 35305 | 35380 | Saint-Péran |
| 35306 | 35430 | Saint-Père-Marc-en-Poulet |
| 35307 | 35190 | Saint-Pern |
| 35309 | 35560 | Saint-Rémy-du-Plain |
| 35310 | 35133 | Saint-Sauveur-des-Landes |
| 35311 | 35330 | Saint-Séglin |
| 35312 | 35580 | Saint-Senoux |
| 35314 | 35430 | Saint-Suliac |
| 35316 | 35390 | Saint-Sulpice-des-Landes |
| 35315 | 35250 | Saint-Sulpice-la-Forêt |
| 35317 | 35630 | Saint-Symphorien |
| 35318 | 35190 | Saint-Thual |
| 35319 | 35310 | Saint-Thurial |
| 35320 | 35360 | Saint-Uniac |
| 35321 | 35320 | Saulnières |
| 35322 | 35320 | Le Sel-de-Bretagne |
| 35324 | 35133 | La Selle-en-Luitré |
| 35325 | 35130 | La Selle-Guerchaise |
| 35326 | 35490 | Sens-de-Bretagne |
| 35327 | 35530 | Servon-sur-Vilaine |
| 35328 | 35550 | Sixt-sur-Aff |
| 35329 | 35610 | Sougeal |
| 35330 | 35500 | Taillis |
| 35331 | 35160 | Talensac |
| 35332 | 35620 | Teillay |
| 35333 | 35240 | Le Theil-de-Bretagne |
| 35334 | 35235 | Thorigné-Fouillard |
| 35335 | 35134 | Thourie |
| 35336 | 35460 | Le Tiercent |
| 35337 | 35190 | Tinténiac |
| 35338 | 35370 | Torcé |
| 35339 | 35610 | Trans-la-Forêt |
| 35340 | 35380 | Treffendel |
| 35342 | 35270 | Trémeheuc |
| 35343 | 35320 | Tresbœuf |
| 35345 | 35190 | Trévérien |
| 35346 | 35190 | Trimer |
| 35362 | 35540 | Le Tronchet |
| 35004 | 35560 | Val-Couesnon |
| 35168 | 35330 | Val d'Anast |
| 35347 | 35450 | Val-d'Izé |
| 35350 | 35680 | Vergéal |
| 35351 | 35160 | Le Verger |
| 35352 | 35770 | Vern-sur-Seiche |
| 35353 | 35132 | Vezin-le-Coquet |
| 35354 | 35610 | Vieux-Viel |
| 35355 | 35490 | Vieux-Vy-sur-Couesnon |
| 35356 | 35630 | Vignoc |
| 35357 | 35420 | Villamée |
| 35358 | 35430 | La Ville-ès-Nonais |
| 35359 | 35130 | Visseiche |
| 35360 | 35500 | Vitré |
| 35361 | 35960 | Le Vivier-sur-Mer |

== See also ==
- Cantons of the Ille-et-Vilaine department
- Ille-et-Vilaine
