= Saint-Marcan =

Saint-Marcan Saent-Marqaen (Gallo) Sant-Marc’han (Breton)
- Commune
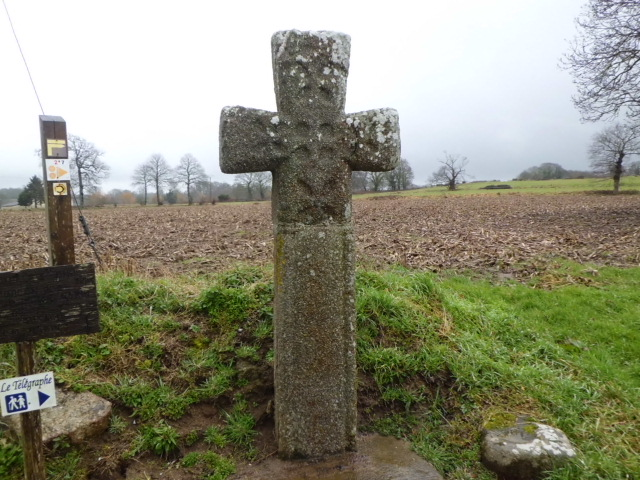
- Old Medieval Cross
- Location of Saint-Marcan
- Location within France Location within Brittany
- Coordinates: 48°35′19″N 1°37′56″W
- Country: France
- Region: Brittany
- Department: Ille-et-Vilaine
- Arrondissement: Saint-Malo
- Canton: Dol-de-Bretagne

Government
  - Mayor (2020–2026): Louis Leport
- Area^{1}: 7.68 km^{2} (2.97 sq mi)
- Highest elevation: 96 m (315 ft)
- Lowest elevation: 4 m (13 ft)
- Population (2023): 431
  - Density: 56.1/km^{2} (145/sq mi)
- Time zone: UTC+01:00 (CET)
  - Summer (DST): UTC+02:00 (CEST)
- INSEE/Postal code: 35291 /35120
- ^{1} French Land Register data, which excludes lakes, ponds, glaciers > 1 km^{2} (0.386 sq mi or 247 acres) and river estuaries.

Saint-Marcan (French pronunciation: [sɛ̃ maʁkɑ̃]; Gallo: Saent-Marqaen, Breton: Sant-Marc'han) is a commune in the Ille-et-Vilaine department in Brittany in northwestern France.

== Population ==
Inhabitants of Saint-Marcan are called marcanais in French.

Historical population
Year	Pop.	±% p.a.
1968	544	—
1975	453	−2.58%
1982	398	−1.83%
1990	401	+0.09%
1999	380	−0.60%
2007	428	+1.50%
2012	470	+1.89%
2017	448	−0.95%
2023	431	−0.64%
Source: INSEE

== Sights ==
- Menhir
- Medieval Christian Cross
- Chappe Tower

== See also ==
- Communes of the Ille-et-Vilaine department

== Saint Marcin in Ireland ==
In the heart of the Rosclave Channel in west County Mayo in the Republic of Ireland were the visible the remains of St. Marcin's Castle, Church, outdoor altar and a burial ground. However, it appears little remains of these features other than on historical maps. *
