= Longaulnay =

Longaulnay Hirwerneg (Breton)
- Commune
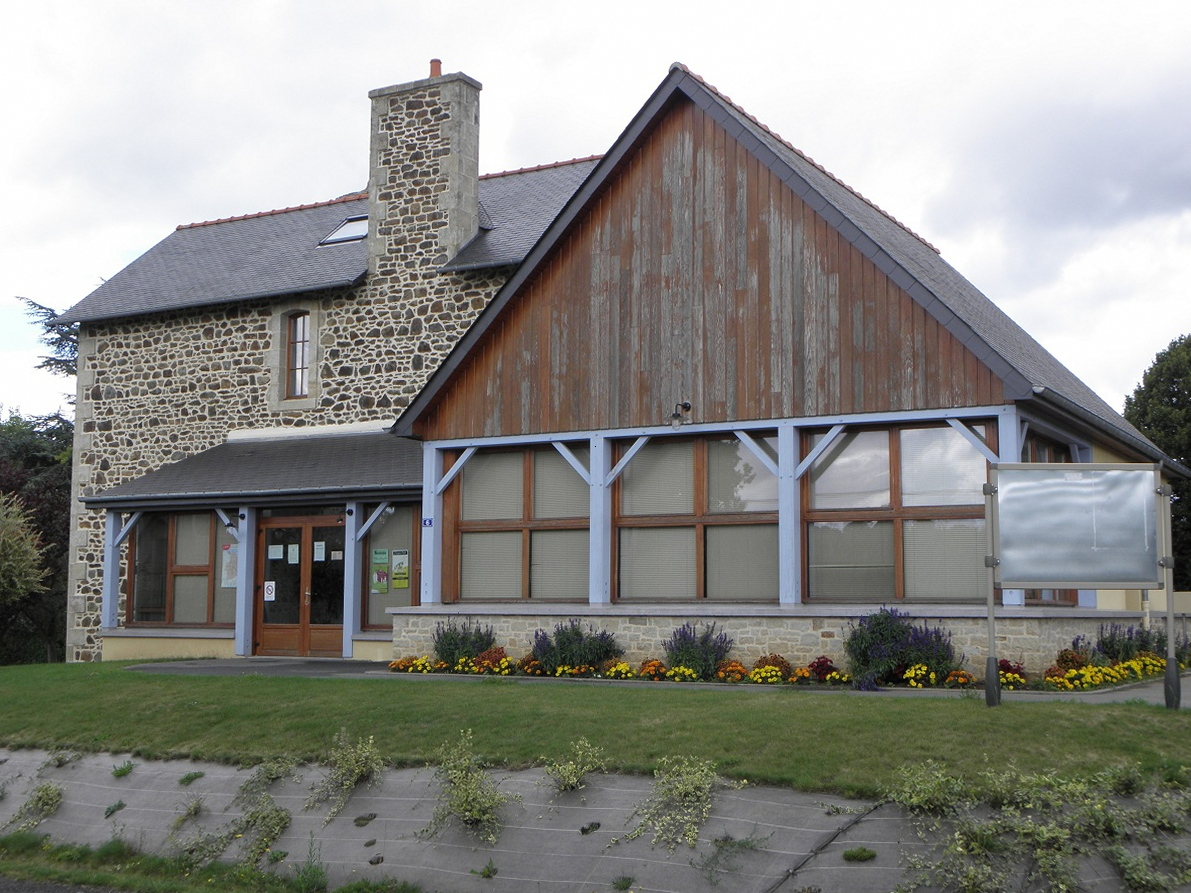
- The town hall of Longaulnay

- Coat of arms
- Location of Longaulnay
- Location within France Location within Brittany
- Coordinates: 48°18′39″N 1°56′18″W
- Country: France
- Region: Brittany
- Department: Ille-et-Vilaine
- Arrondissement: Saint-Malo
- Canton: Combourg
- Intercommunality: Bretagne Romantique

Government
  - Mayor (2020–2026): David Buisset
- Area^{1}: 7.52 km^{2} (2.90 sq mi)
- Highest elevation: 191 m (627 ft)
- Lowest elevation: 65 m (213 ft)
- Population (2023): 592
  - Density: 78.7/km^{2} (204/sq mi)
- Time zone: UTC+01:00 (CET)
  - Summer (DST): UTC+02:00 (CEST)
- INSEE/Postal code: 35156 /35190
- ^{1} French Land Register data, which excludes lakes, ponds, glaciers > 1 km^{2} (0.386 sq mi or 247 acres) and river estuaries.

Longaulnay (Breton: Hirwerneg) is a commune in the Ille-et-Vilaine department of Brittany in northwestern France.

== Population ==
Inhabitants of Longaulnay are called in French longaulnéens.

Historical population
Year	Pop.	±% p.a.
1968	413	—
1975	363	−1.83%
1982	327	−1.48%
1990	303	−0.95%
1999	340	+1.29%
2007	564	+6.53%
2012	615	+1.75%
2017	616	+0.03%
2023	592	−0.66%
Source: INSEE

== See also ==
- Communes of the Ille-et-Vilaine department
