= Bonnemain =

Bonnemain Bonemein (Gallo) Bonmaen (Breton)
- Commune
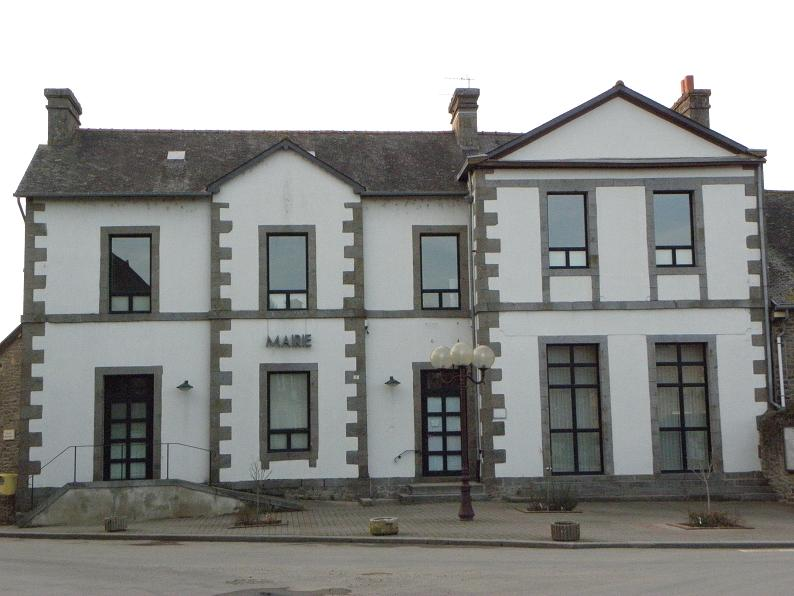
- Town hall
- Location of Bonnemain
- Location within France Location within Brittany
- Coordinates: 48°28′02″N 1°45′53″W
- Country: France
- Region: Brittany
- Department: Ille-et-Vilaine
- Arrondissement: Saint-Malo
- Canton: Combourg
- Intercommunality: CC Bretagne Romantique

Government
  - Mayor (2020–2026): Marcel Piot
- Area^{1}: 23.77 km^{2} (9.18 sq mi)
- Highest elevation: 108 m (354 ft)
- Lowest elevation: 43 m (141 ft)
- Population (2023): 1,536
  - Density: 64.62/km^{2} (167.4/sq mi)
- Time zone: UTC+01:00 (CET)
  - Summer (DST): UTC+02:00 (CEST)
- INSEE/Postal code: 35029 /35270
- ^{1} French Land Register data, which excludes lakes, ponds, glaciers > 1 km^{2} (0.386 sq mi or 247 acres) and river estuaries.

Bonnemain (French pronunciation: [bɔnmɛ̃]; Gallo: Bonemein, Breton: Bonmaen) is a commune in the Ille-et-Vilaine department of the region in Brittany in northwestern France.

== Population ==
Historical population
| Year | Pop. | ±% p.a. |
|---|---|---|
| 1968 | 1,251 | — |
| 1975 | 1,094 | −1.90% |
| 1982 | 1,149 | +0.70% |
| 1990 | 1,177 | +0.30% |
| 1999 | 1,138 | −0.37% |
| 2007 | 1,217 | +0.84% |
| 2012 | 1,414 | +3.05% |
| 2017 | 1,566 | +2.06% |
| 2023 | 1,536 | −0.32% |
Source: INSEE

Inhabitants of Bonnemain are called Bonnemainésiens in French.

== See also ==
- Communes of the Ille-et-Vilaine department
