= Pleine-Fougères =

Pleine-Fougères Plleune Foujërr (Gallo) Planfili (Breton)
- Commune
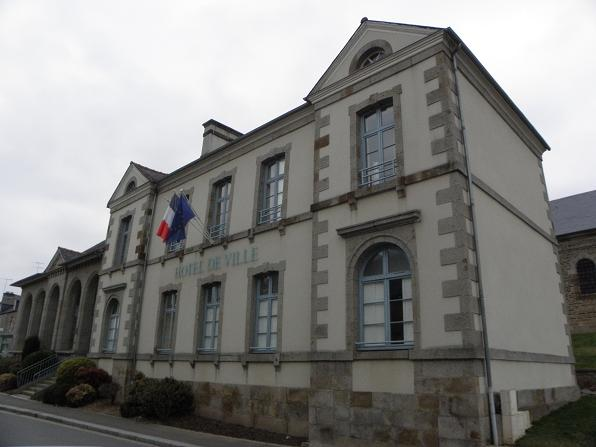
- The town hall of Pleine-Fougères

- Coat of arms
- Location of Pleine-Fougères
- Location within France Location within Brittany
- Coordinates: 48°32′03″N 1°33′46″W
- Country: France
- Region: Brittany
- Department: Ille-et-Vilaine
- Arrondissement: Saint-Malo
- Canton: Dol-de-Bretagne

Government
  - Mayor (2020–2026): Louis Thébault
- Area^{1}: 31.98 km^{2} (12.35 sq mi)
- Highest elevation: 93 m (305 ft)
- Lowest elevation: 5 m (16 ft)
- Population (2023): 2,002
  - Density: 62.60/km^{2} (162.1/sq mi)
- Time zone: UTC+01:00 (CET)
  - Summer (DST): UTC+02:00 (CEST)
- INSEE/Postal code: 35222 /35610
- ^{1} French Land Register data, which excludes lakes, ponds, glaciers > 1 km^{2} (0.386 sq mi or 247 acres) and river estuaries.

Pleine-Fougères (French pronunciation: [plɛn fuʒɛʁ]; Gallo: Plleune Foujërr, Breton: Planfili) is a commune in the Ille-et-Vilaine department of Brittany in northwestern France.

== Population ==
Inhabitants of Pleine-Fougères are called in French pleine-fougerais.

Historical population
Year	Pop.	±% p.a.
1968	2,036	—
1975	1,878	−1.15%
1982	1,769	−0.85%
1990	1,802	+0.23%
1999	1,737	−0.41%
2007	1,808	+0.50%
2012	1,966	+1.69%
2017	1,980	+0.14%
2023	2,002	+0.18%
Source: INSEE

== See also ==
- Communes of the Ille-et-Vilaine department
