= Canton of Saint-Malo-Nord =

Coordinates: 48.6481°N 2.0075°W

The canton of Saint-Malo-Nord is a former canton of France, located in the arrondissement of Saint-Malo, in the Ille-et-Vilaine département, Brittany région. It had 25,703 inhabitants (2012). It was disbanded following the French canton reorganisation which came into effect in March 2015. The canton comprised part of the commune of Saint-Malo.

== Election results ==
The canton of Saint-Malo-Nord is represented in the general council of Ille-et-Vilaine department by the DVD councillor Catherine Jacquemin.

=== 2008 ===
Cantonale Election 2008: Saint-Malo-Nord
| Party | Candidate | Votes | % | ±% |
|---|---|---|---|---|
| DVD | Catherine Jacquemin | 6,198 | 51.11 | |
| PS | Denise Caron | 3,408 | 28.10 | |
| LV | Yannick Le Brelot | 1,660 | 13.69 | |
| PCF | Jean-Charles Le Sager | 860 | 7.69 | |
| Turnout | | 12,545 | 57.39 | |
| DVD hold | | Swing | | |
