= Cuguen =

Cuguen Cugen (Gallo) Kugenn (Breton)
- Commune
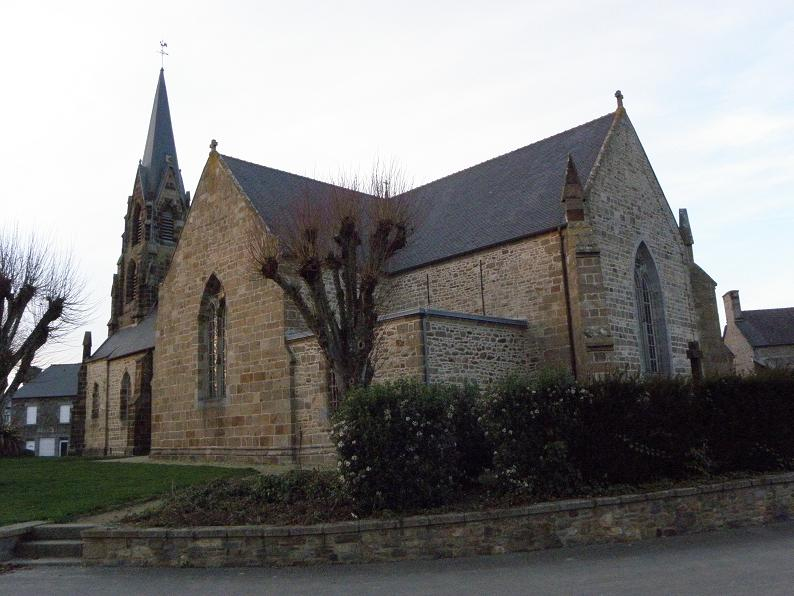
- Saint Martin and Saint Samson church
- Location of Cuguen
- Location within France Location within Brittany
- Coordinates: 48°27′01″N 1°39′43″W
- Country: France
- Region: Brittany
- Department: Ille-et-Vilaine
- Arrondissement: Saint-Malo
- Canton: Combourg
- Intercommunality: CC Bretagne Romantique

Government
  - Mayor (2020–2026): Sandrine Guerche
- Area^{1}: 23.54 km^{2} (9.09 sq mi)
- Highest elevation: 113 m (371 ft)
- Lowest elevation: 35 m (115 ft)
- Population (2023): 828
  - Density: 35.2/km^{2} (91.1/sq mi)
- Time zone: UTC+01:00 (CET)
  - Summer (DST): UTC+02:00 (CEST)
- INSEE/Postal code: 35092 /35270
- ^{1} French Land Register data, which excludes lakes, ponds, glaciers > 1 km^{2} (0.386 sq mi or 247 acres) and river estuaries.

Cuguen (French pronunciation: [kyɡɛ̃]; Breton: Kugenn; Gallo: Cugen) is a commune in the Ille-et-Vilaine department in Brittany in northwestern France.

== Population ==
Inhabitants of Cuguen are called Cuguennais in French.

Historical population
| Year | Pop. | ±% p.a. |
|---|---|---|
| 1968 | 856 | — |
| 1975 | 769 | −1.52% |
| 1982 | 670 | −1.95% |
| 1990 | 673 | +0.06% |
| 1999 | 708 | +0.56% |
| 2007 | 796 | +1.48% |
| 2012 | 783 | −0.33% |
| 2017 | 839 | +1.39% |
| 2023 | 828 | −0.22% |
Source: INSEE

== See also ==
- Communes of the Ille-et-Vilaine department
