= La Chapelle-aux-Filtzméens =

La Chapelle-aux-Filtzméens La Chapèll-ez-Fius-Men (Gallo) Chapel-Hilveven (Breton)
- Commune
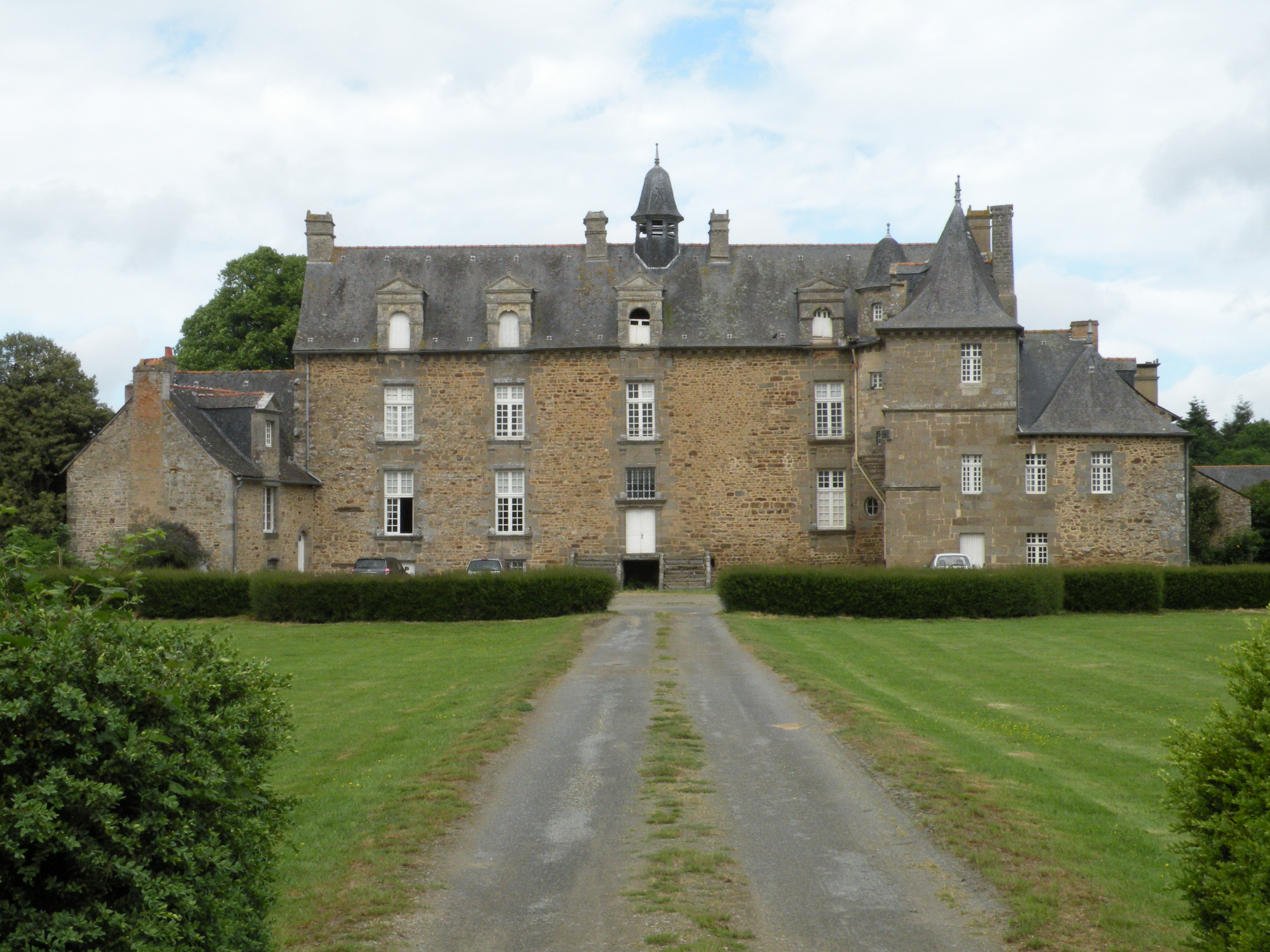
- Chateau
- Location of La Chapelle-aux-Filtzméens
- Location within France Location within Brittany
- Coordinates: 48°23′03″N 1°49′27″W
- Country: France
- Region: Brittany
- Department: Ille-et-Vilaine
- Arrondissement: Saint-Malo
- Canton: Combourg
- Intercommunality: Bretagne Romantique

Government
  - Mayor (2020–2026): Benoit Viart
- Area^{1}: 6.36 km^{2} (2.46 sq mi)
- Highest elevation: 85 m (279 ft)
- Lowest elevation: 21 m (69 ft)
- Population (2023): 824
  - Density: 130/km^{2} (336/sq mi)
- Time zone: UTC+01:00 (CET)
  - Summer (DST): UTC+02:00 (CEST)
- INSEE/Postal code: 35056 /35190
- ^{1} French Land Register data, which excludes lakes, ponds, glaciers > 1 km^{2} (0.386 sq mi or 247 acres) and river estuaries.

La Chapelle-aux-Filtzméens (Gallo: La Chapèll-ez-Fius-Men, Breton: Chapel-Hilveven, before 1985: La Chapelle-aux-Filzméens) is a commune in the Ille-et-Vilaine department in Brittany in northwestern France.

== Population ==
Inhabitants of La Chapelle-aux-Filtzméens are called Capelle-Filismontins in French.

Historical population
Year	Pop.	±% p.a.
1968	358	—
1975	302	−2.40%
1982	297	−0.24%
1990	314	+0.70%
1999	382	+2.20%
2007	627	+6.39%
2012	818	+5.46%
2017	815	−0.07%
2023	824	+0.18%
Source: INSEE

== See also ==
- Communes of the Ille-et-Vilaine department
