= Baguer-Pican =

Baguer-Pican Bayér-Pican (Gallo) Bagar-Bihan (Breton)
- Commune
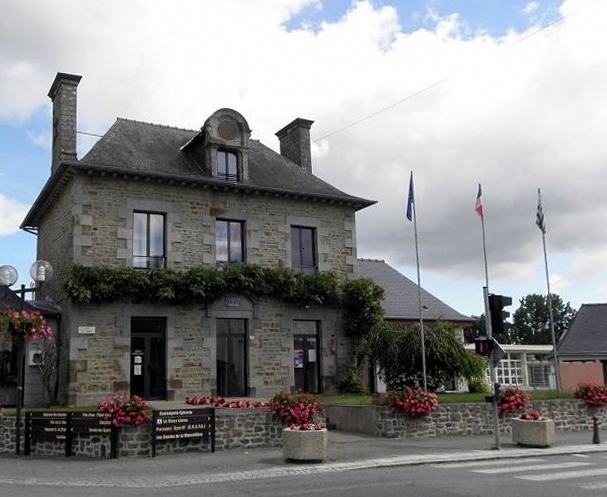
- Town hall
- Location of Baguer-Pican
- Location within France Location within Brittany
- Coordinates: 48°33′12″N 1°41′52″W
- Country: France
- Region: Brittany
- Department: Ille-et-Vilaine
- Arrondissement: Saint-Malo
- Canton: Dol-de-Bretagne

Government
  - Mayor (2020–2026): Sylvie Duguépéroux
- Area^{1}: 15.63 km^{2} (6.03 sq mi)
- Highest elevation: 90 m (300 ft)
- Lowest elevation: 1 m (3.3 ft)
- Population (2023): 1,756
  - Density: 112.3/km^{2} (291.0/sq mi)
- Time zone: UTC+01:00 (CET)
  - Summer (DST): UTC+02:00 (CEST)
- INSEE/Postal code: 35010 /35120
- ^{1} French Land Register data, which excludes lakes, ponds, glaciers > 1 km^{2} (0.386 sq mi or 247 acres) and river estuaries.

Baguer-Pican (French pronunciation: [baɡɛʁ pikɑ̃]; Breton: Bagar-Bihan; Gallo: Bayér-Pican) is a commune in the Ille-et-Vilaine department in Brittany in northwestern France.

== Population ==
Historical population
Year	Pop.	±% p.a.
1968	911	—
1975	832	−1.29%
1982	873	+0.69%
1990	980	+1.46%
1999	985	+0.06%
2007	1,238	+2.90%
2012	1,509	+4.04%
2017	1,681	+2.18%
2023	1,756	+0.73%
Source: INSEE

Inhabitants of Baguer-Pican are called Picanais in French.

== See also ==
- Communes of the Ille-et-Vilaine department
