= Trimer, Ille-et-Vilaine =

Trimer Tremeur (Breton)
- Commune
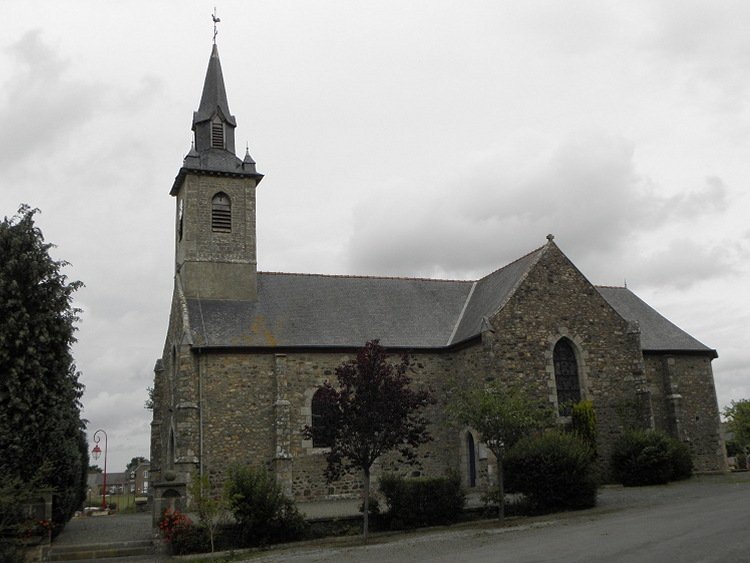
- The church in Trimer
- Location of Trimer
- Location within France Location within Brittany
- Coordinates: 48°20′29″N 1°53′33″W
- Country: France
- Region: Brittany
- Department: Ille-et-Vilaine
- Arrondissement: Saint-Malo
- Canton: Combourg
- Intercommunality: CC Bretagne Romantique

Government
  - Mayor (2020–2026): Christophe Baot
- Area^{1}: 3.56 km^{2} (1.37 sq mi)
- Highest elevation: 87 m (285 ft)
- Lowest elevation: 29 m (95 ft)
- Population (2023): 205
  - Density: 57.6/km^{2} (149/sq mi)
- Time zone: UTC+01:00 (CET)
  - Summer (DST): UTC+02:00 (CEST)
- INSEE/Postal code: 35346 /35190
- ^{1} French Land Register data, which excludes lakes, ponds, glaciers > 1 km^{2} (0.386 sq mi or 247 acres) and river estuaries.

Trimer (Breton: Tremeur) is a commune in the Ille-et-Vilaine department of Brittany in northwestern France.

== Population ==
Historical population
| Year | Pop. | ±% p.a. |
|---|---|---|
| 1968 | 152 | — |
| 1975 | 131 | −2.10% |
| 1982 | 111 | −2.34% |
| 1990 | 102 | −1.05% |
| 1999 | 102 | +0.00% |
| 2007 | 174 | +6.90% |
| 2012 | 183 | +1.01% |
| 2017 | 214 | +3.18% |
| 2023 | 205 | −0.71% |
Source: INSEE

== See also ==
- Communes of the Ille-et-Vilaine department
