= Broualan =

Broualan Beréoalan (Gallo)
- Commune
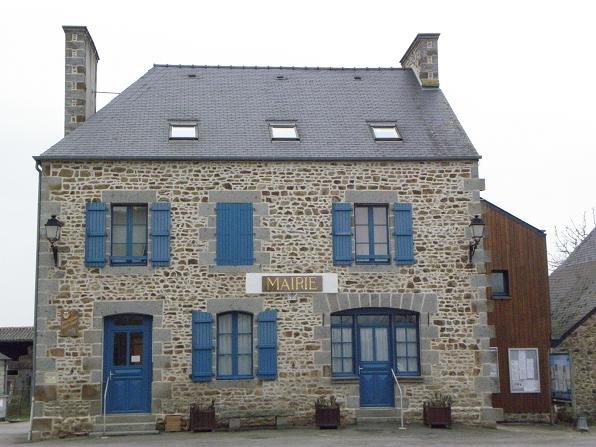
- Town hall

- Coat of arms
- Location of Broualan
- Location within France Location within Brittany
- Coordinates: 48°28′28″N 1°38′56″W
- Country: France
- Region: Brittany
- Department: Ille-et-Vilaine
- Arrondissement: Saint-Malo
- Canton: Dol-de-Bretagne
- Intercommunality: Pays de Dol et Baie du Mont Saint-Michel

Government
  - Mayor (2020–2026): André Davy
- Area^{1}: 12.76 km^{2} (4.93 sq mi)
- Highest elevation: 116 m (381 ft)
- Lowest elevation: 60 m (200 ft)
- Population (2023): 415
  - Density: 32.5/km^{2} (84.2/sq mi)
- Time zone: UTC+01:00 (CET)
  - Summer (DST): UTC+02:00 (CEST)
- INSEE/Postal code: 35044 /35120
- ^{1} French Land Register data, which excludes lakes, ponds, glaciers > 1 km^{2} (0.386 sq mi or 247 acres) and river estuaries.

Broualan (French pronunciation: [bʁualɑ̃]; Gallo: Beréoalan, Breton: Broualan) is a commune in the Ille-et-Vilaine department in Brittany in northwestern France.

== Population ==
Inhabitants of Broualan are called Broualanais in French.

Historical population
Year	Pop.	±% p.a.
1968	372	—
1975	299	−3.07%
1982	268	−1.55%
1990	279	+0.50%
1999	290	+0.43%
2007	305	+0.63%
2012	376	+4.27%
2017	373	−0.16%
2023	415	+1.79%
Source: INSEE

== Gallery ==
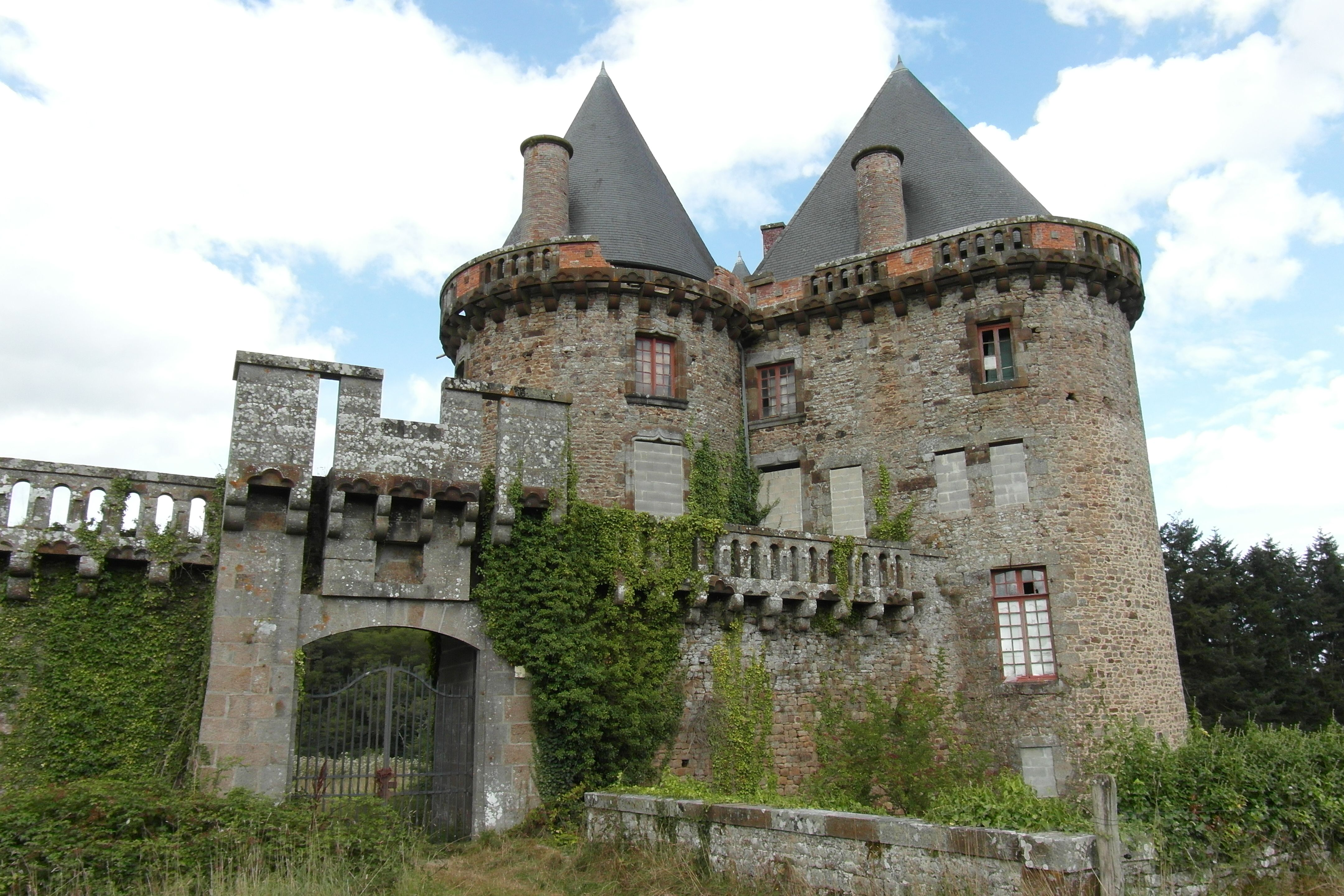
Château de Landal

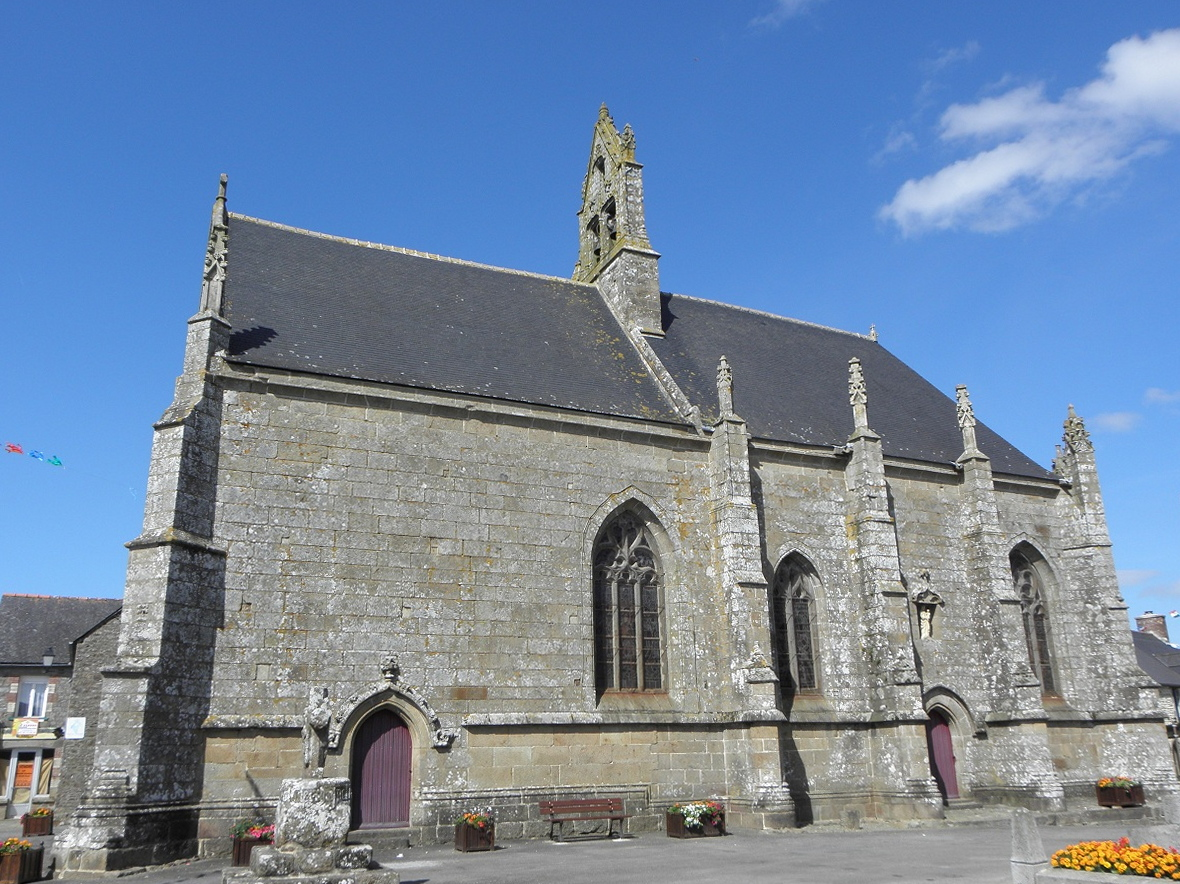
Notre-Dame-de-Toutes-Joies church

== See also ==
- Communes of the Ille-et-Vilaine department
