= Canton of Pleine-Fougères =

Coordinates: 48.5389°N 1.5939°W

Pleine-Fougères
- Former canton
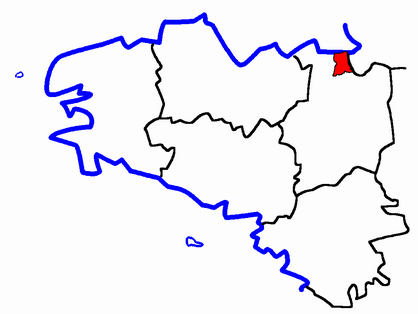
- Country: France
- Region: Brittany
- Department: Ille-et-Vilaine
- No. of communes: {{{nbcomm}}}
- Disbanded: 2015
- Area: 184.17 km^{2} (71.11 sq mi)
- Population (2012): 8,475
  - Density: 46.02/km^{2} (119.2/sq mi)

The Canton of Pleine-Fougères is a former canton of France, in the Ille-et-Vilaine département, located in the north of the department. It was disbanded following the French canton reorganisation which came into effect in March 2015. It consisted of 11 communes, and its population was 8,475 in 2012.
