= Lanrigan =

Lanrigan Lanrigan (Breton)
- Commune
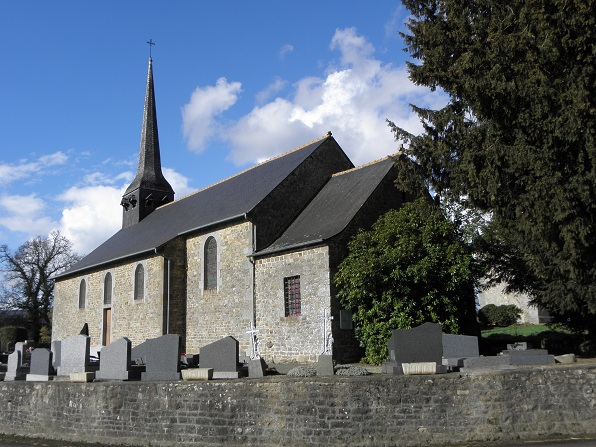
- The church of Saint-Martin
- Location of Lanrigan
- Location within France Location within Brittany
- Coordinates: 48°23′50″N 1°41′51″W
- Country: France
- Region: Brittany
- Department: Ille-et-Vilaine
- Arrondissement: Rennes
- Canton: Combourg
- Intercommunality: CC Bretagne Romantique

Government
  - Mayor (2020–2026): Sébastien Delabroise
- Area^{1}: 3.98 km^{2} (1.54 sq mi)
- Highest elevation: 85 m (279 ft)
- Lowest elevation: 50 m (160 ft)
- Population (2023): 136
  - Density: 34.2/km^{2} (88.5/sq mi)
- Time zone: UTC+01:00 (CET)
  - Summer (DST): UTC+02:00 (CEST)
- INSEE/Postal code: 35148 /35270
- ^{1} French Land Register data, which excludes lakes, ponds, glaciers > 1 km^{2} (0.386 sq mi or 247 acres) and river estuaries.

Lanrigan (French pronunciation: [lɑ̃ʁiɡɑ̃]; Breton: Lanrigan) is a commune in the Ille-et-Vilaine department of Brittany in northwestern France.

== Population ==
Inhabitants of Lanrigan are called Lanriganais in French.

Historical population
Year	Pop.	±% p.a.
1968	132	—
1975	128	−0.44%
1982	107	−2.53%
1990	104	−0.35%
1999	108	+0.42%
2007	120	+1.33%
2012	148	+4.28%
2017	152	+0.53%
2023	136	−1.84%
Source: INSEE

== See also ==
- Communes of the Ille-et-Vilaine department
