= Canton of Combourg =

Coordinates: 48.41°N 1.75°W

Combourg
- Canton
- Country: France
- Region: Brittany
- Department: Ille-et-Vilaine
- No. of communes: {{{nbcomm}}}
- Area: 426.03 km^{2} (164.49 sq mi)
- Population (2023): 34,496
  - Density: 80.971/km^{2} (209.71/sq mi)
- INSEE code: 35 06

The Canton of Combourg is a canton of France, in the Ille-et-Vilaine département, located in the northwest of the department. At the French canton reorganisation which came into effect in March 2015, the canton was expanded from 10 to 26 communes (3 of which were merged into the new commune Mesnil-Roc'h).

It consists of the following communes:

1. La Baussaine
2. Bonnemain
3. Cardroc
4. La Chapelle-aux-Filtzméens
5. Combourg
6. Cuguen
7. Dingé
8. Les Iffs
9. Lanrigan
10. Longaulnay
11. Lourmais
12. Meillac
13. Mesnil-Roc'h
14. Plesder
15. Pleugueneuc
16. Québriac
17. Saint-Brieuc-des-Iffs
18. Saint-Domineuc
19. Saint-Léger-des-Prés
20. Saint-Thual
21. Tinténiac
22. Trémeheuc
23. Trévérien
24. Trimer
