= Cardroc =

Cardroc Cadro (Gallo) Kerdreg (Breton)
- Commune
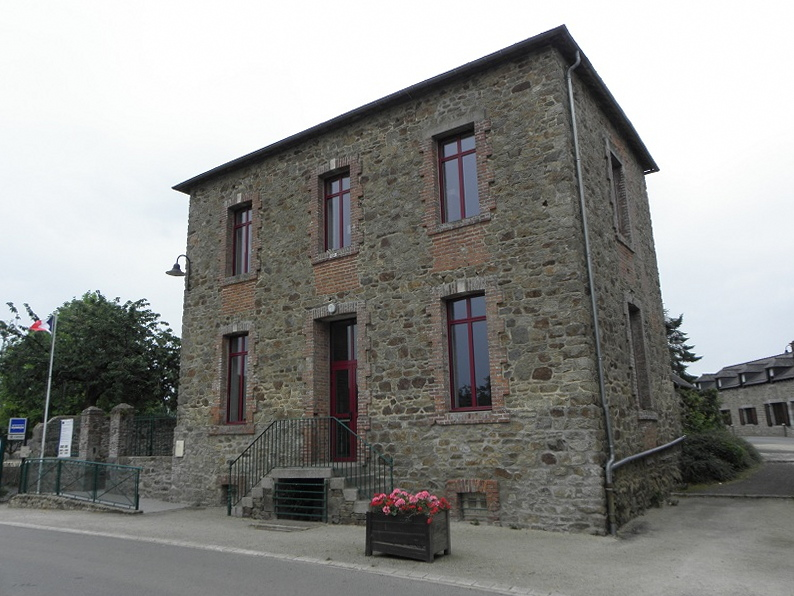
- Town hall

- Coat of arms
- Location of Cardroc
- Location within France Location within Brittany
- Coordinates: 48°17′10″N 1°53′19″W
- Country: France
- Region: Brittany
- Department: Ille-et-Vilaine
- Arrondissement: Rennes
- Canton: Combourg

Government
  - Mayor (2020–2026): Marie-Thérèse Cakain
- Area^{1}: 7.39 km^{2} (2.85 sq mi)
- Highest elevation: 152 m (499 ft)
- Lowest elevation: 65 m (213 ft)
- Population (2023): 589
  - Density: 79.7/km^{2} (206/sq mi)
- Time zone: UTC+01:00 (CET)
  - Summer (DST): UTC+02:00 (CEST)
- INSEE/Postal code: 35050 /35190
- ^{1} French Land Register data, which excludes lakes, ponds, glaciers > 1 km^{2} (0.386 sq mi or 247 acres) and river estuaries.

Cardroc (French pronunciation: [kaʁdʁɔk]; Gallo: Cadro, Breton: Kerdreg) is a commune in the Ille-et-Vilaine department in Brittany in northwestern France.

== Population ==
Inhabitants of Cardroc are called Cardreuciens in French.

Historical population
Year	Pop.	±% p.a.
1968	402	—
1975	351	−1.92%
1982	332	−0.79%
1990	376	+1.57%
1999	400	+0.69%
2007	484	+2.41%
2012	537	+2.10%
2017	574	+1.34%
2023	589	+0.43%
Source: INSEE

== See also ==
- Communes of the Ille-et-Vilaine department
