= Canton of Tinténiac =

Coordinates: 48.3575°N 1.8943°W

Tinténiac
- Former canton
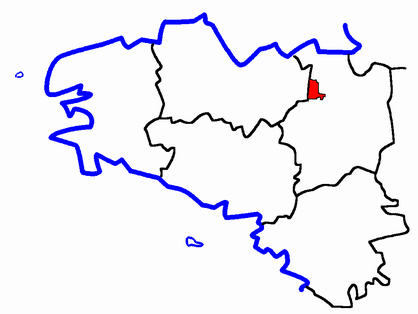
- Country: France
- Region: Brittany
- Department: Ille-et-Vilaine
- No. of communes: {{{nbcomm}}}
- Disbanded: 2015
- Area: 125.2 km^{2} (48.3 sq mi)
- Population (2012): 12,150
  - Density: 97.04/km^{2} (251.3/sq mi)

The Canton of Tinténiac is a former canton of France, in the Ille-et-Vilaine département, located in the northwest of the department. It was disbanded following the French canton reorganisation which came into effect in March 2015. It consisted of 10 communes, and its population was 12,150 in 2012.
