= Canton of Châteauneuf-d'Ille-et-Vilaine =

Coordinates: 48.5491°N 1.8996°W

Châteauneuf-d'Ille-et-Vilaine
- Former canton
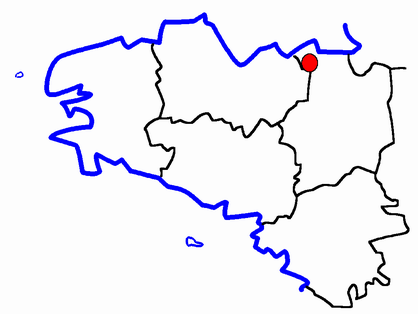
- Country: France
- Region: Brittany
- Department: Ille-et-Vilaine
- No. of communes: {{{nbcomm}}}
- Disbanded: 2015
- Area: 103.60 km^{2} (40.00 sq mi)
- Population (2012): 14,374
  - Density: 138.75/km^{2} (359.35/sq mi)

The Canton of Châteauneuf-d'Ille-et-Vilaine is a former canton of France, in the Ille-et-Vilaine département, located in the northwest of the department. It was disbanded following the French canton reorganisation which came into effect in March 2015. It consisted of 9 communes, and its population was 14,374 in 2012.
