= Saint-Brieuc-des-Iffs =

Saint-Brieuc-des-Iffs Saent-Berioec (Gallo) Sant-Brieg-an-Ivineg (Breton)
- Commune
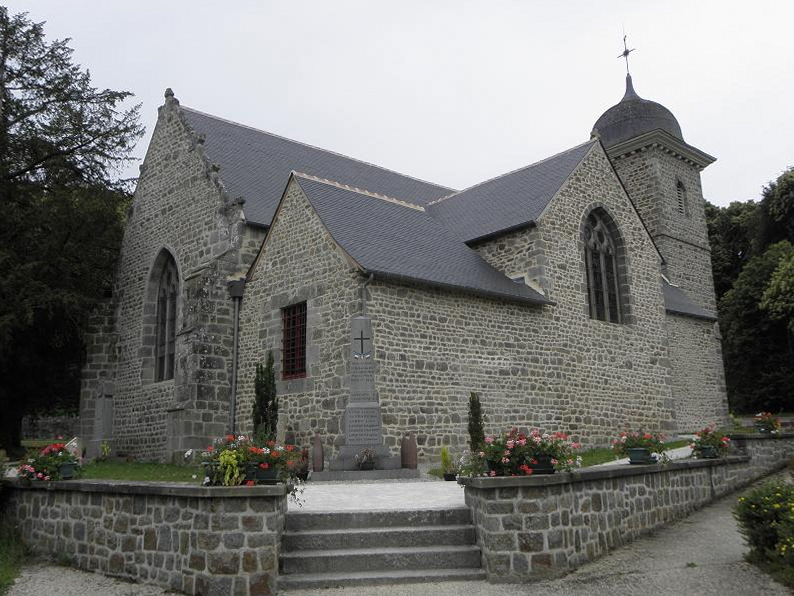
- The parish church of Saint-Brieuc
- Location of Saint-Brieuc-des-Iffs
- Location within France Location within Brittany
- Coordinates: 48°17′31″N 1°51′00″W
- Country: France
- Region: Brittany
- Department: Ille-et-Vilaine
- Arrondissement: Rennes
- Canton: Combourg

Government
  - Mayor (2020–2026): Rémi Couet
- Area^{1}: 8.29 km^{2} (3.20 sq mi)
- Highest elevation: 133 m (436 ft)
- Lowest elevation: 34 m (112 ft)
- Population (2023): 330
  - Density: 40/km^{2} (100/sq mi)
- Time zone: UTC+01:00 (CET)
  - Summer (DST): UTC+02:00 (CEST)
- INSEE/Postal code: 35258 /35630
- ^{1} French Land Register data, which excludes lakes, ponds, glaciers > 1 km^{2} (0.386 sq mi or 247 acres) and river estuaries.

Saint-Brieuc-des-Iffs (French pronunciation: [sɛ̃ bʁijø de.z‿if], literally Saint-Brieuc of Les Iffs; Gallo: Saent-Berioec, Breton: Sant-Brieg-an-Ivineg) is a commune in the Ille-et-Vilaine department in Brittany in northwestern France.

== Population ==
Historical population
Year	Pop.	±% p.a.
1968	258	—
1975	257	−0.06%
1982	279	+1.18%
1990	288	+0.40%
1999	296	+0.30%
2007	355	+2.30%
2012	355	+0.00%
2017	340	−0.86%
2023	330	−0.50%
Source: INSEE

Inhabitants of Saint-Brieuc-des-Iffs are called briochins in French.

== See also ==
- Communes of the Ille-et-Vilaine department
