= Les Iffs =

Les Iffs An Ivineg (Breton)
- Commune
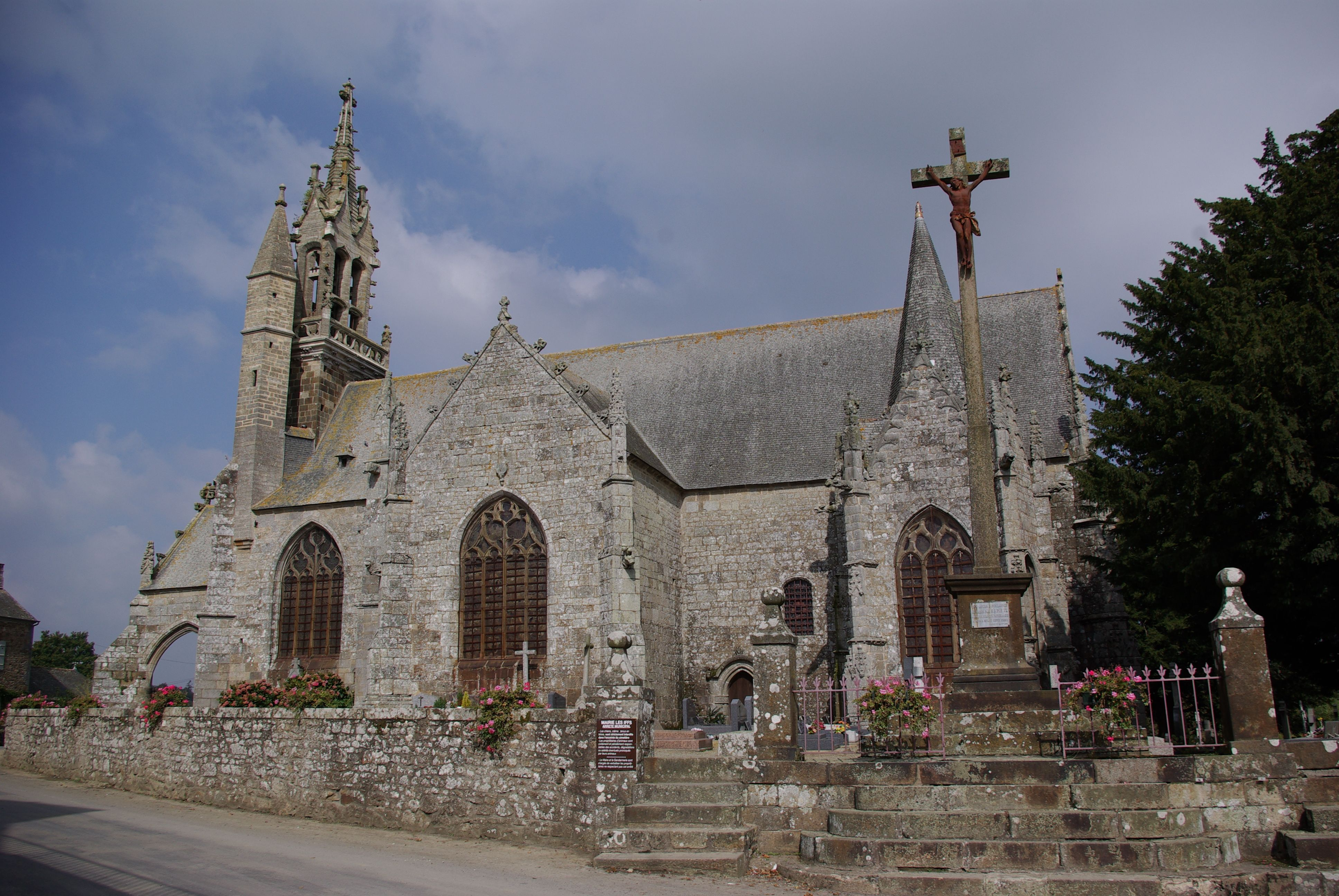
- Saint Ouen church
- Location of Les Iffs
- Location within France Location within Brittany
- Coordinates: 48°17′19″N 1°51′56″W
- Country: France
- Region: Brittany
- Department: Ille-et-Vilaine
- Arrondissement: Rennes
- Canton: Combourg
- Intercommunality: Bretagne Romantique

Government
  - Mayor (2020–2026): Jean-Yves Jullien
- Area^{1}: 4.52 km^{2} (1.75 sq mi)
- Highest elevation: 141 m (463 ft)
- Lowest elevation: 53 m (174 ft)
- Population (2023): 274
  - Density: 60.6/km^{2} (157/sq mi)
- Time zone: UTC+01:00 (CET)
  - Summer (DST): UTC+02:00 (CEST)
- INSEE/Postal code: 35134 /35630
- ^{1} French Land Register data, which excludes lakes, ponds, glaciers > 1 km^{2} (0.386 sq mi or 247 acres) and river estuaries.

Les Iffs (French pronunciation: [le.z‿if]; Breton: An Ivineg) is a commune in the Ille-et-Vilaine department of Brittany in north-western France.

== Population ==
Inhabitants of Les Iffs are called in French ifféens.

Historical population
Year	Pop.	±% p.a.
1968	208	—
1975	191	−1.21%
1982	178	−1.00%
1990	218	+2.57%
1999	232	+0.69%
2007	254	+1.14%
2012	269	+1.15%
2017	272	+0.22%
2023	274	+0.12%
Source: INSEE

== See also ==
- Communes of the Ille-et-Vilaine department
