= Montreuil =

French place name

Montreuil is a French place name derived from Medieval Latin Monasteriolum, "Little Monastery".

It most often refers to Montreuil, Seine-Saint-Denis (also called Montreuil-sous-Bois), a French commune in the eastern suburbs of Paris, Seine-St-Denis department.

It may also refer to:

== Communes of France ==
- Montreuil, Eure-et-Loir, in the Eure-et-Loir department
- Montreuil, Vendée, known as Montreuil-sur-Mer until 1945, in the Vendée department
- Montreuil-au-Houlme, in the Orne department
- Montreuil-aux-Lions, in the Aisne department
- Montreuil-Bellay, in the Maine-et-Loire department
- Montreuil-Bonnin, in the Vienne department
- Montreuil-des-Landes, in the Ille-et-Vilaine department
- Montreuil-en-Auge, in the Calvados department
- Montreuil-en-Caux, in the Seine-Maritime department
- Montreuil-en-Touraine, in the Indre-et-Loire department
- Montreuil-Juigné, in the Maine-et-Loire department
- Montreuil-la-Cambe, in the Orne department
- Montreuil-l'Argillé, in the Eure department
- Montreuil-le-Chétif, in the Sarthe department
- Montreuil-le-Gast, in the Ille-et-Vilaine department
- Montreuil-le-Henri, in the Sarthe department
- Montreuil-Poulay, in the Mayenne department
- Montreuil-sous-Pérouse, in the Ille-et-Vilaine department
- Montreuil-sur-Barse, in the Aube department
- Montreuil-sur-Blaise, in the Haute-Marne department
- Montreuil-sur-Brêche, in the Oise department
- Montreuil-sur-Epte, in the Val d'Oise department
- Montreuil-sur-Ille, in the Ille-et-Vilaine department
- Montreuil-sur-Loir, in the Maine-et-Loire department
- Montreuil-sur-Lozon, in the Manche department
- Montreuil-sur-Maine, in the Maine-et-Loire department
- Montreuil-sur-Mer, known as Montreuil until 2023, in the Pas-de-Calais department
- Montreuil-sur-Thérain, in the Oise department
- Montreuil-sur-Thonnance, in the Haute-Marne department

== Other uses ==
- Arrondissement of Montreuil, in the Pas-de-Calais department in the Hauts-de-France region
- Canton of Montreuil, a former canton in the Pas-de-Calais department and the Nord-Pas de Calais region
- Domain of Montreuil, a parcel of land near Versailles and the official residence of Madame Élisabeth
- Montreuil Abbey, a Cistercian nunnery in Picardy, formerly known as Montreuil-les-Dames, Montreuil-en-Thiérache, and Montreuil-sous-Laon, in the Aisne department
- Opportuna of Montreuil (d. 770), a French nun, abbess, and saint
- Pierre de Montreuil (died 1267), a French architect
- Mairie de Montreuil station, a Paris Metro station in Montreuil, Seine-Saint-Denis
- Montreuil–Hôpital station, a Paris Metro station in Montreuil, Seine-Saint-Denis
- Porte de Montreuil station, a Paris Metro station in Paris

== See also ==
- Reuil
- Montreux and Monthureux, French and Swiss towns also named from their growth around little monasteries
- Montreal, of unrelated etymology
