= La Régalante =

European cycling route

La Régalante (V409)
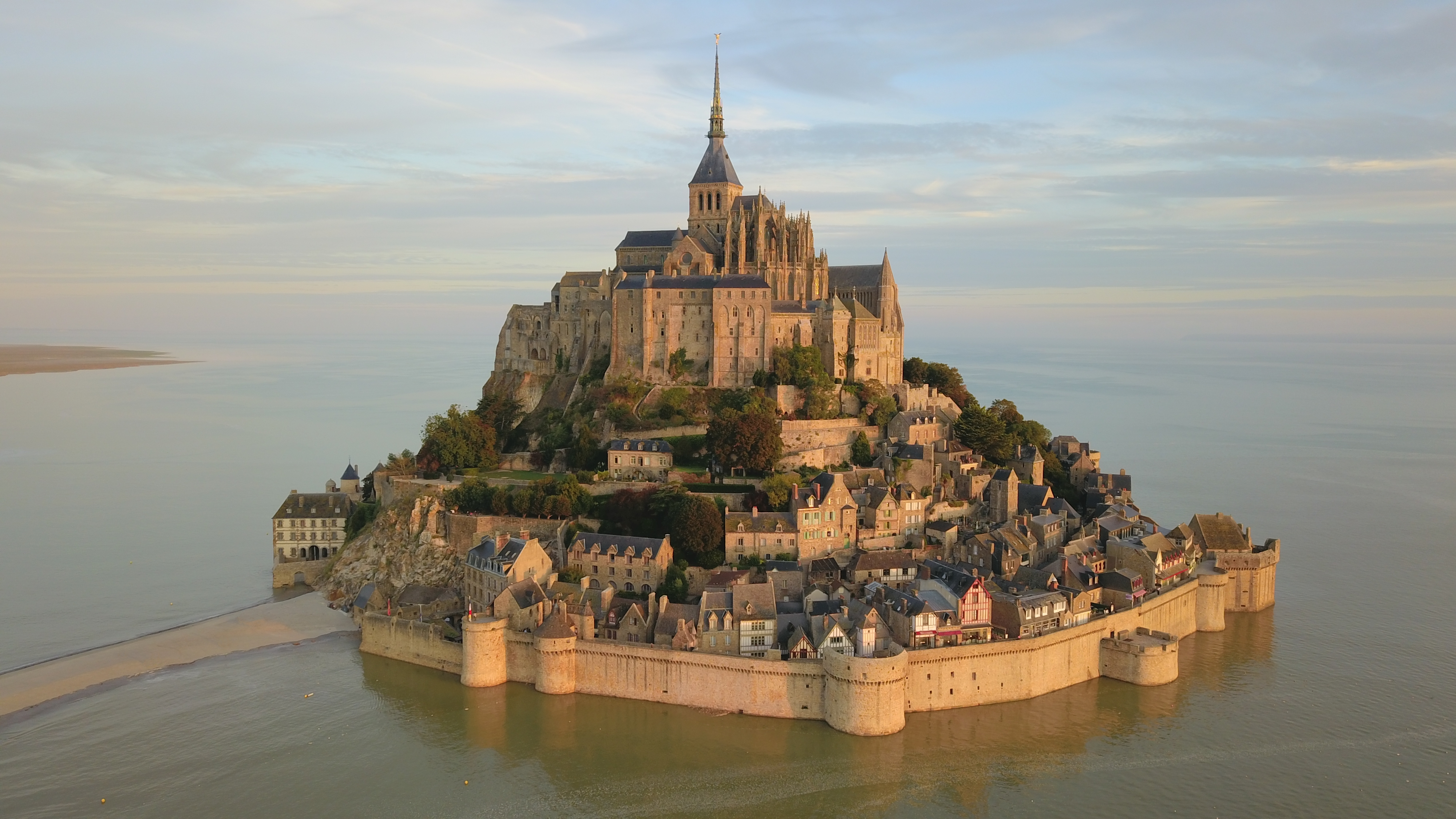
- Length: 275 km (171 mi)
- Trailheads: Nantes to Mont-Saint-Michel
- Use: cycling
- Highest point: 161
- Lowest point: 4
- Difficulty: Easy
- Website: Francevelotourisme.com

La Régalante is a French cycle route that begins on the northern quay of the Loire in Nantes (Loire-Atlantique), at the junction with La Loire à Vélo route, and ends at the entrance to the island of Mont-Saint-Michel (Manche (department)). This cycling route running is 275 km long, it crosses the historic region of the Marches de Bretagne, Duchy of Brittany protection border zone, between the Loire and the Channel.

The V409 identifier is visible on all traffic signs along La Régalante, cycling route running.

== History ==
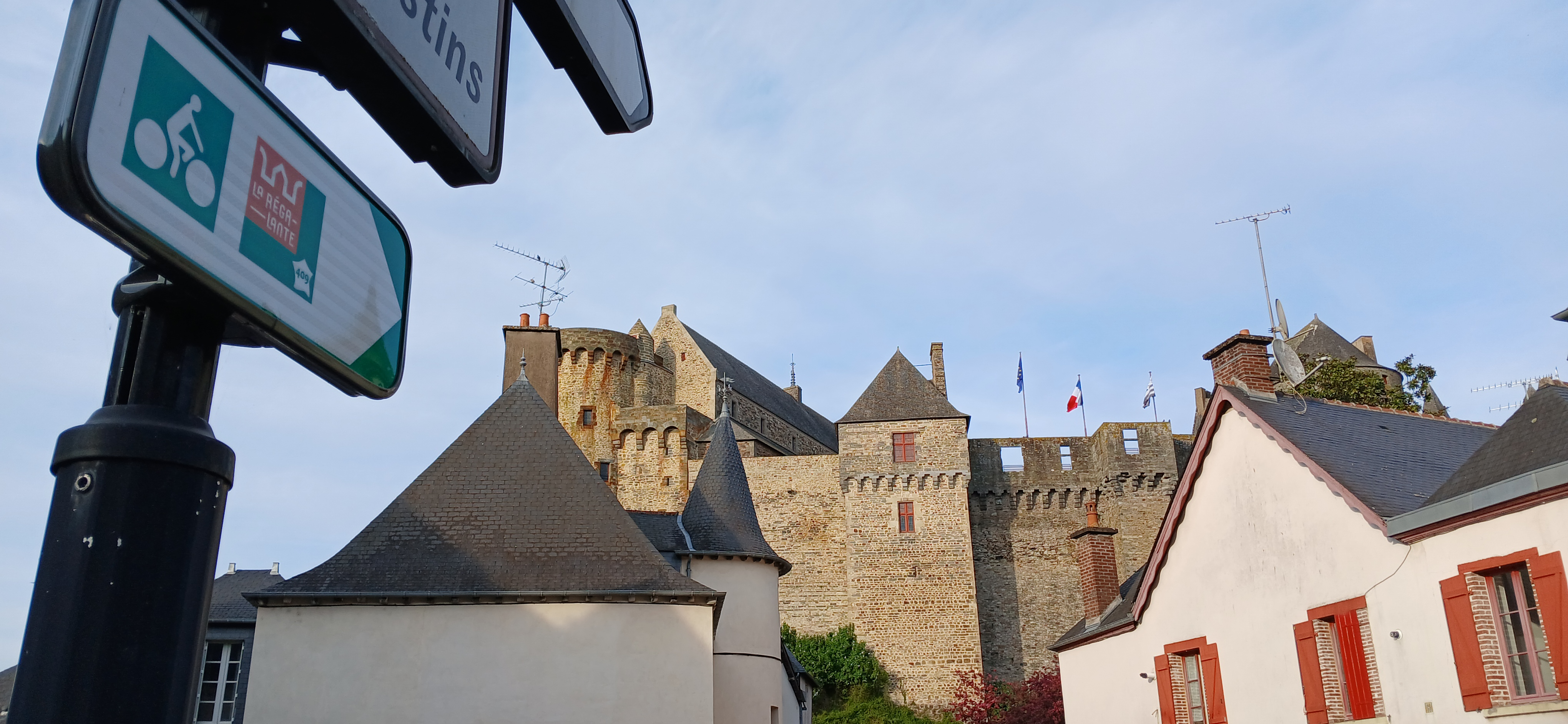
"La Régalante" traffic signs near the Château de Vitré

In 2021, recreational cycling is booming following the COVID-19 pandemic. As a result, local authorities are keen to develop tourism "in the interior" of Brittany, which is less attractive than coastal tourism, and therefore to benefit from economic spinoffs. Cooperation is thus fostered through the creation of a route committee. It is made up of three departments (Manche, Loire-Atlantique, Ille-et-Vilaine) and the 10 local government area crossed by the route.

La Régalante was inaugurated on March 23, 2024.

The route is also known in UK since the British daily newspaper "The Guardian" produced a report on the Régalante.

== Route ==
La Régalante Route between the Loire and the Channel, West of France.

La Régalante cycling route is renowned for its ease of access. The stages are short, ranging from 19 to 40 km in distance, with moderate elevation gain, and half of the route is on dedicated lanes. The cycle route is considered easy and is accessible to all types of cyclists, whether in groups or with families. The route crosses a region rich in heritage, including major monuments and fortified castles (Fougères, Vitré, Châteaubriant), picturesque and preserved towns and villages, numerous lakes with their biodiversity, and rolling natural landscapes.

The main stopover towns are:

- Nantes
- Nort-sur-Erdre
- La Meilleraye-de-Bretagne
- Châteaubriant
- Martigné-Ferchaud
- La Guerche-de-Bretagne
- Vitré
- Fougères
- Maen Roch
- Le Mont-Saint-Michel

3 regions crossed:

- Normandy
- Brittany
- Pays de la Loire

== Photos ==
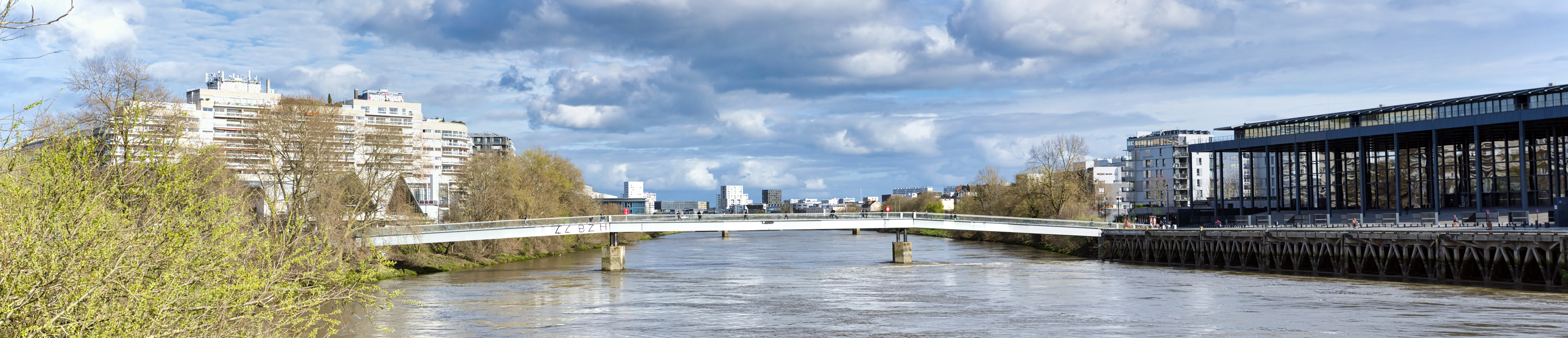
Victor Schoelcher gateway Nantes, starting/arrival cycleway la Régalante, jonction with La Loire à Vélo.

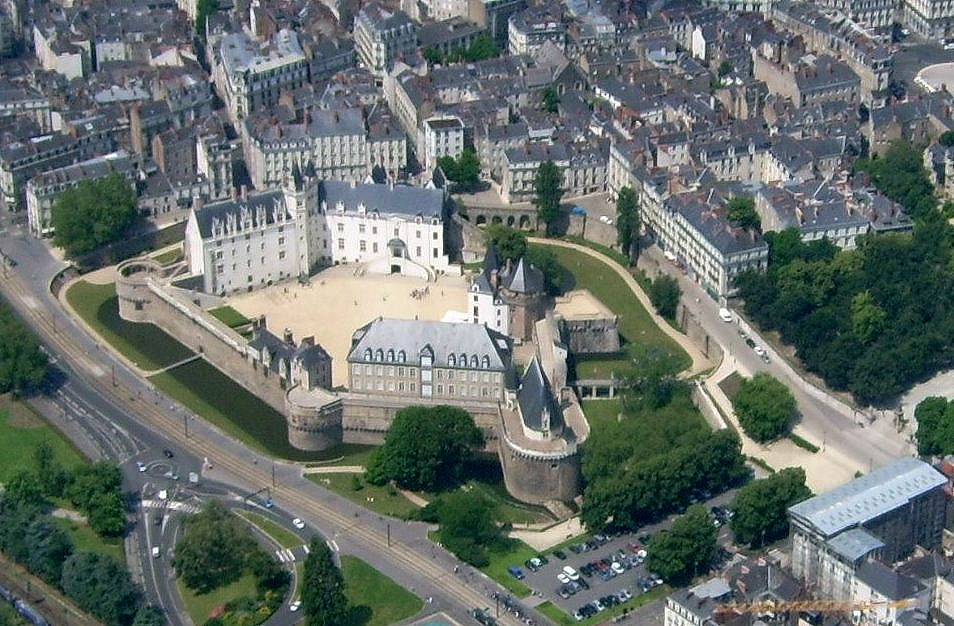
Château des Ducs de Bretagne, Nantes

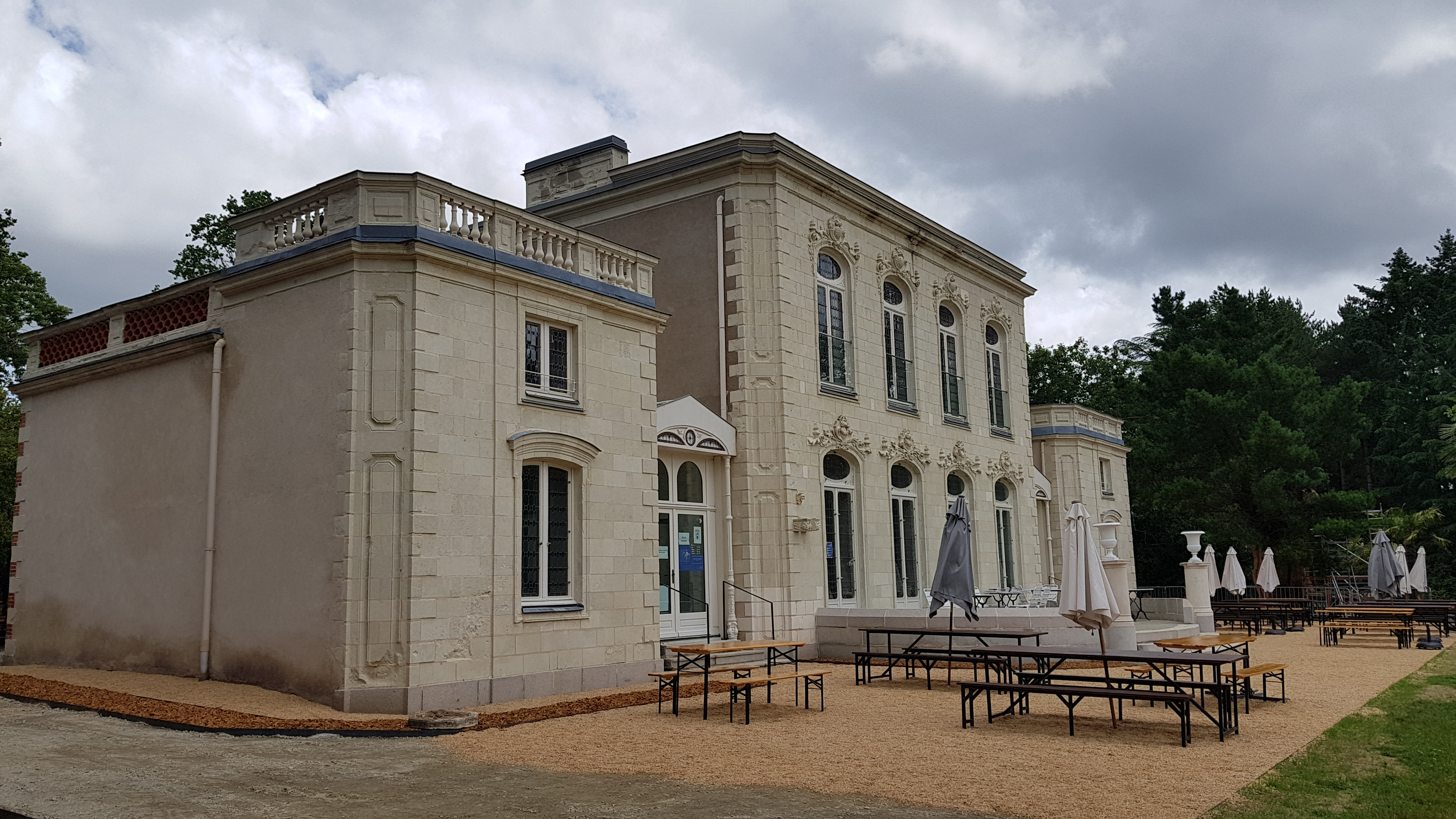
Manoir de La Châtaigneraie, Sucé-sur-Erdre

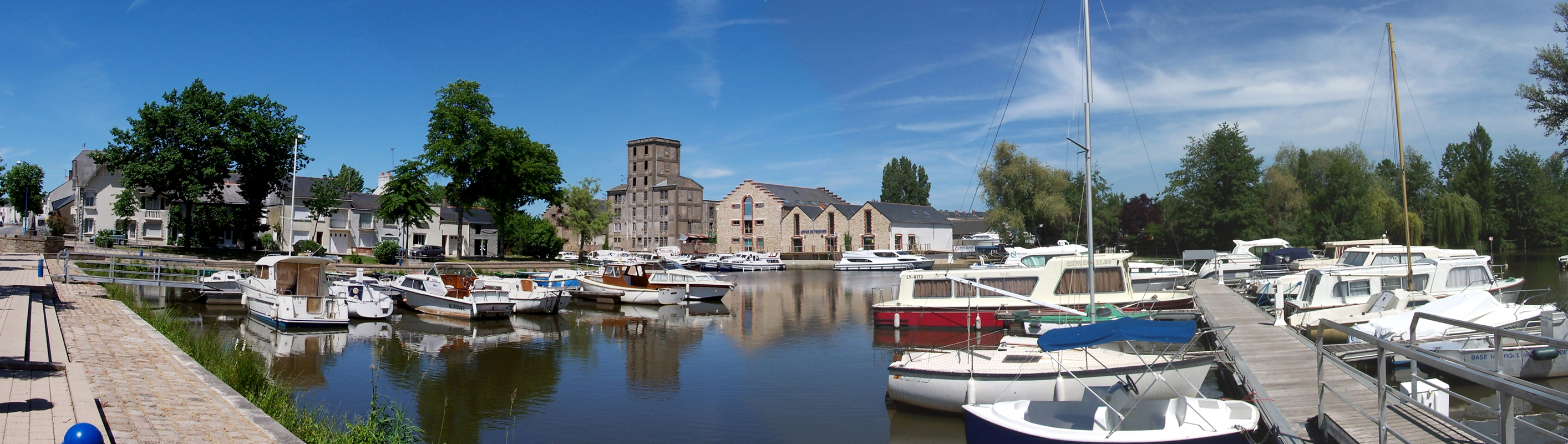
Le Bassin (marina and old flour mill, Nort-sur-Erdre)

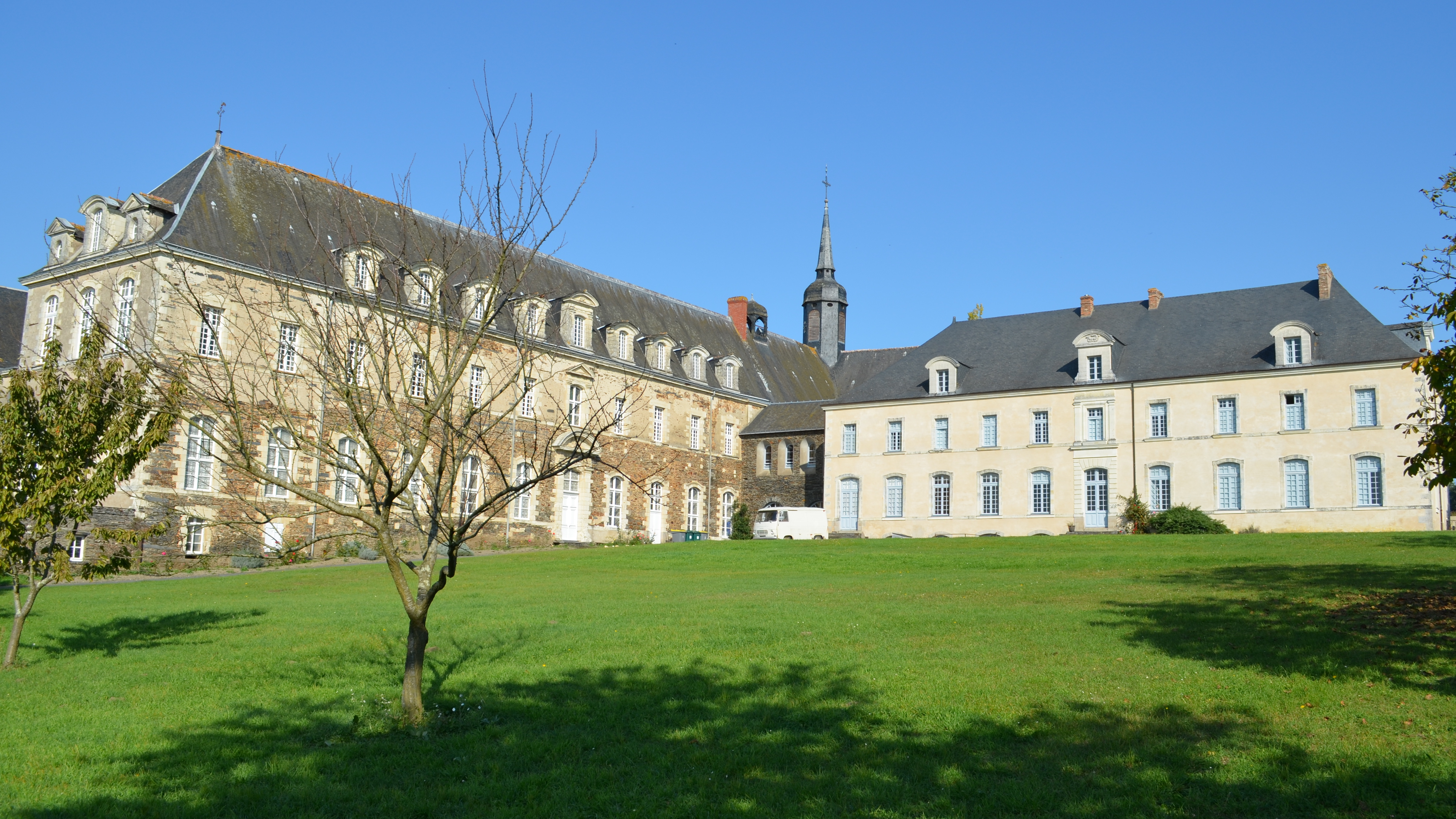
Abbaye Notre-Dame de Melleray, La Meilleraye-de-Bretagne

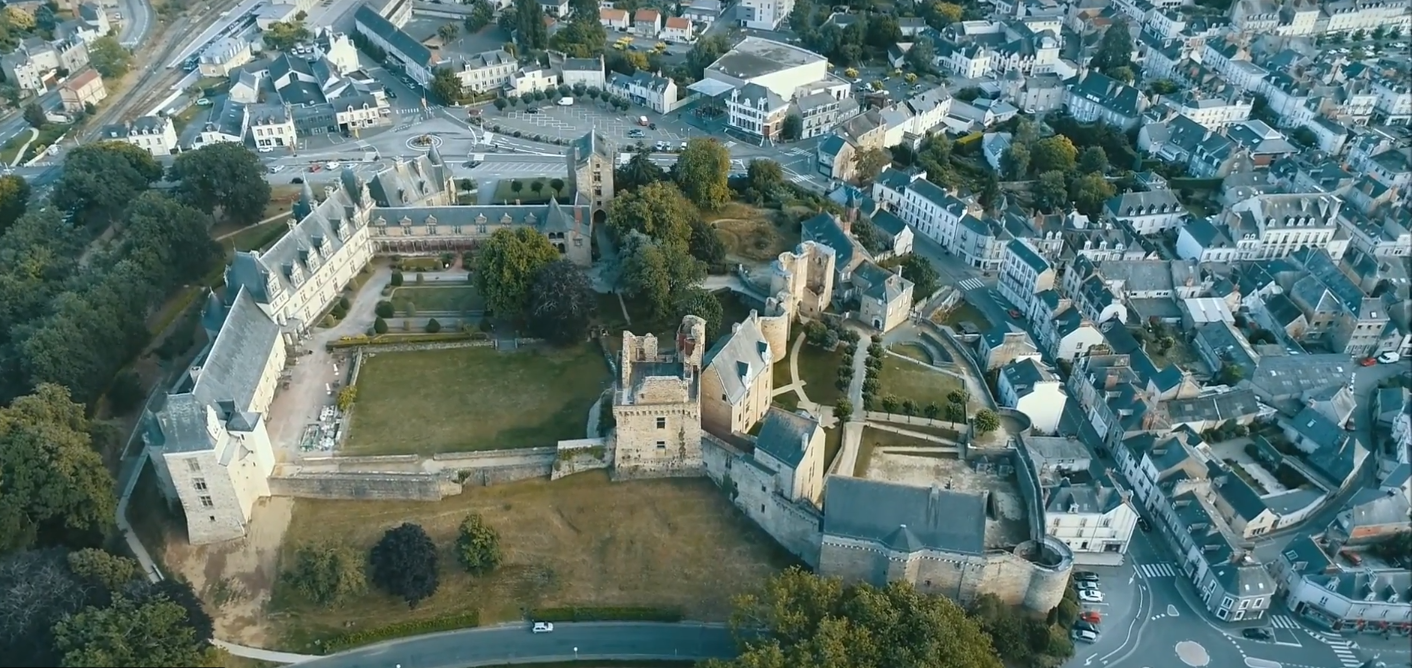
Château de Châteaubriant

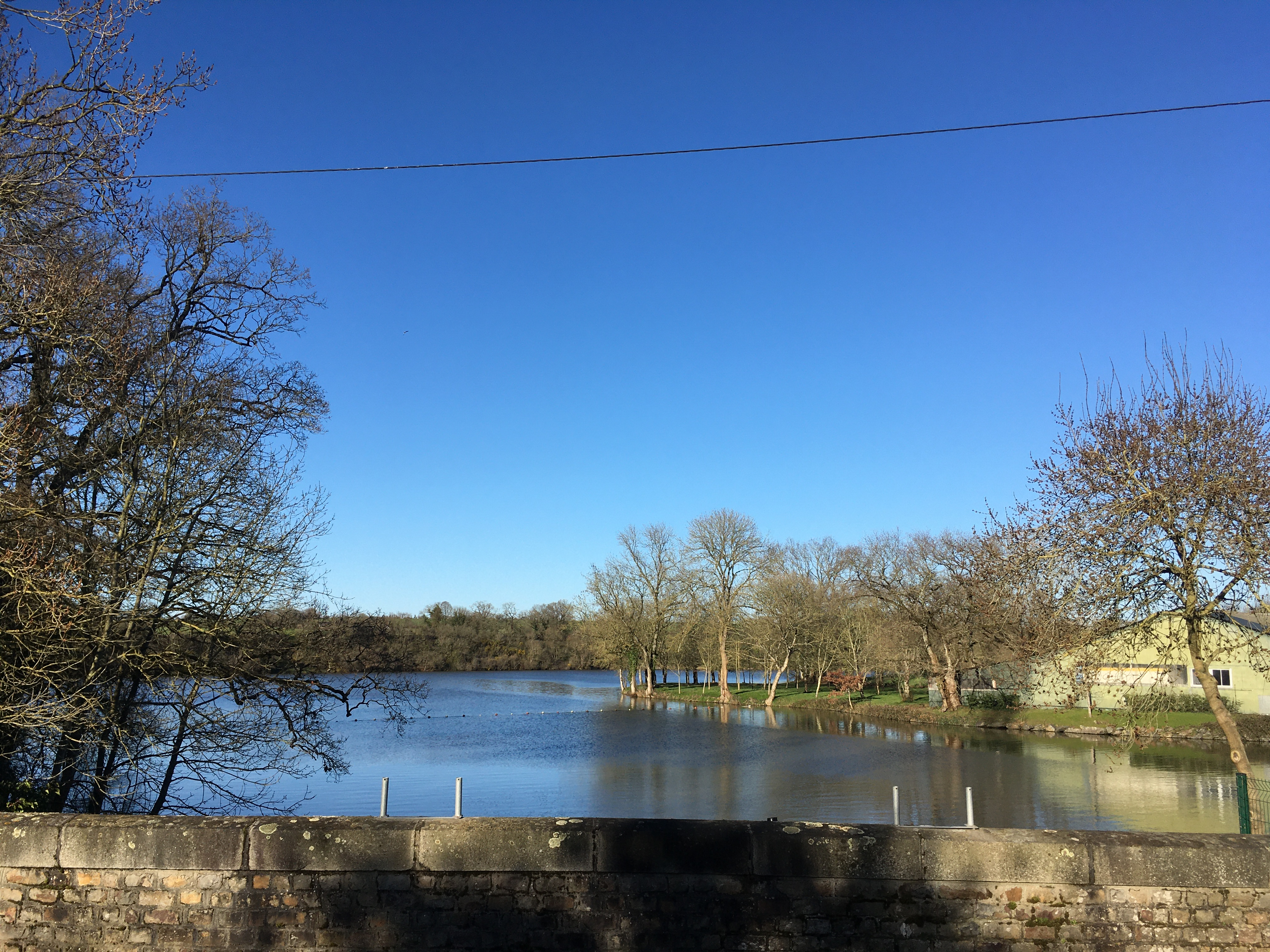
Forge Pond, Martigné-Ferchaud

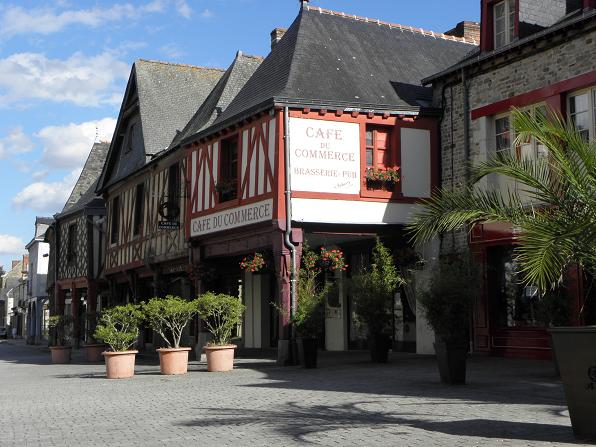
old houses, La Guerche-de-Bretagne

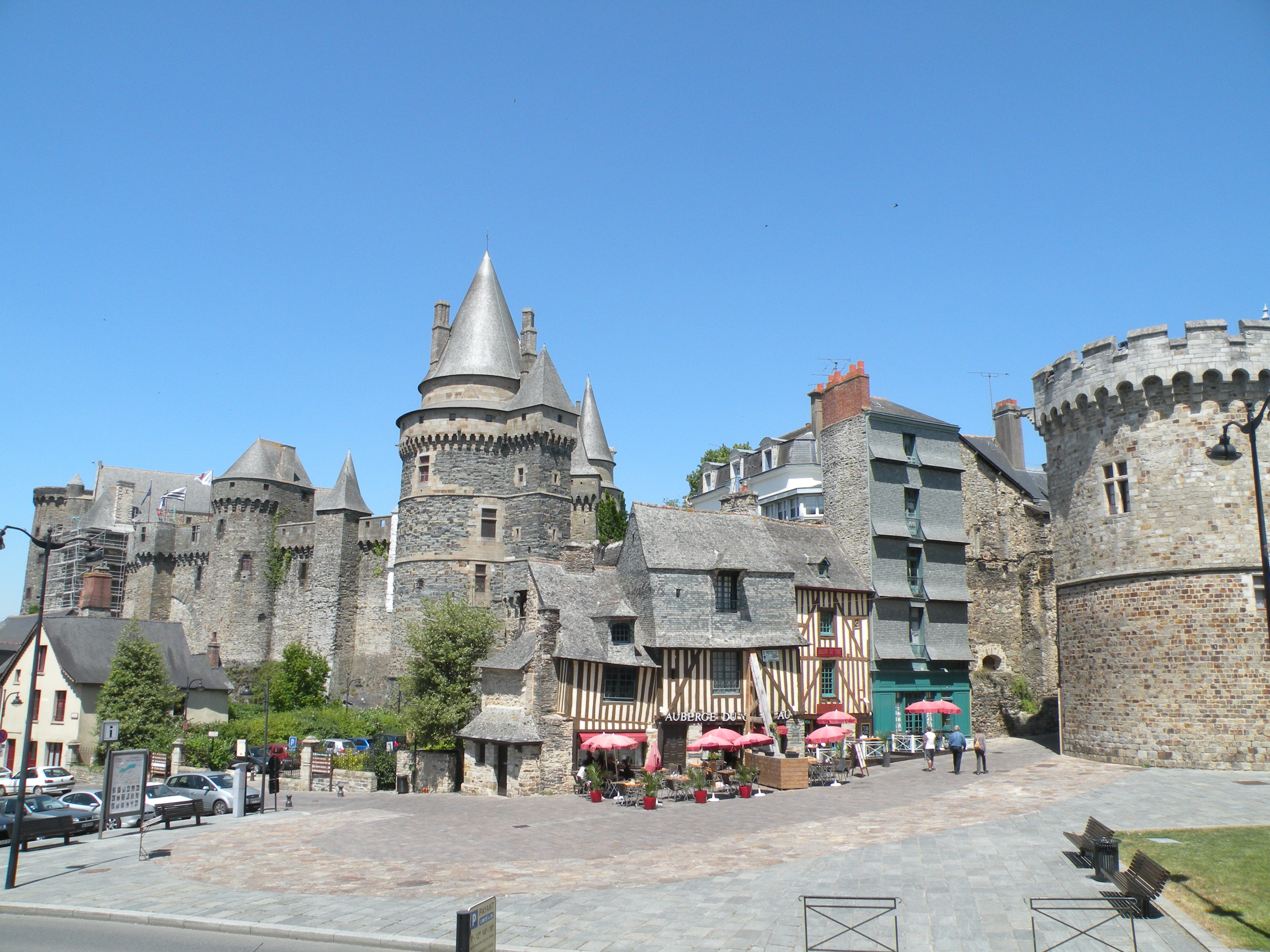
Medieval town, remparts, churches and old buildings, Vitré

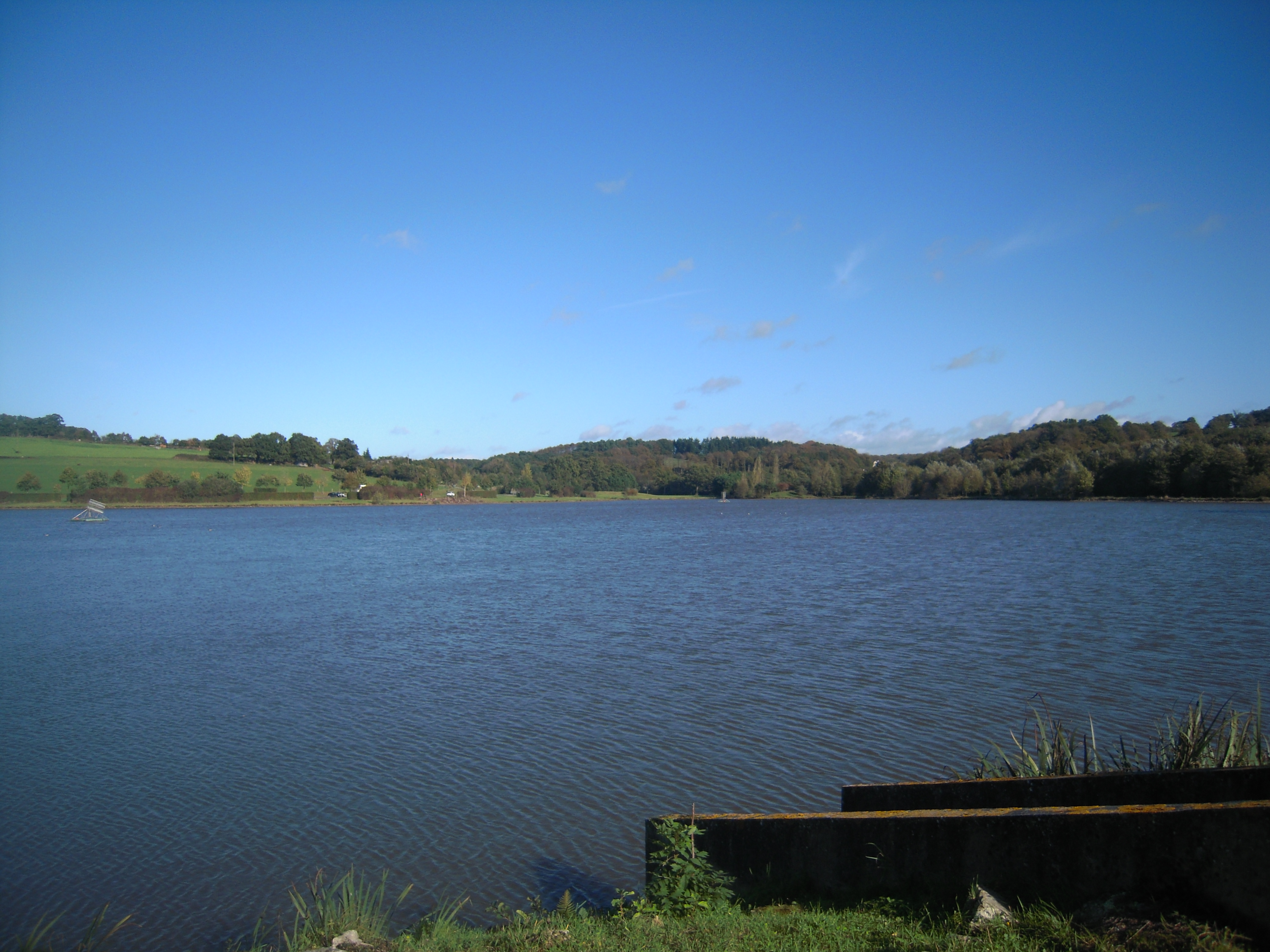
Hills and Cantache Lake, Montreuil-sous-Pérouse

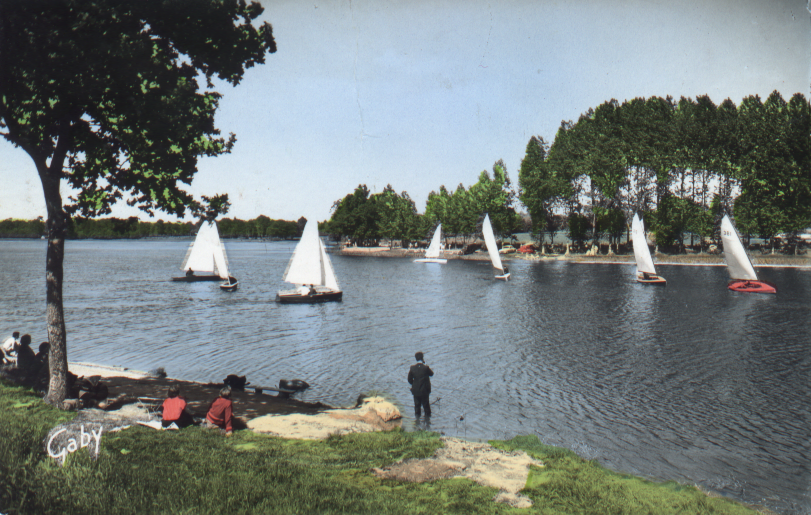
Châtillon-en-Vendelais Lake

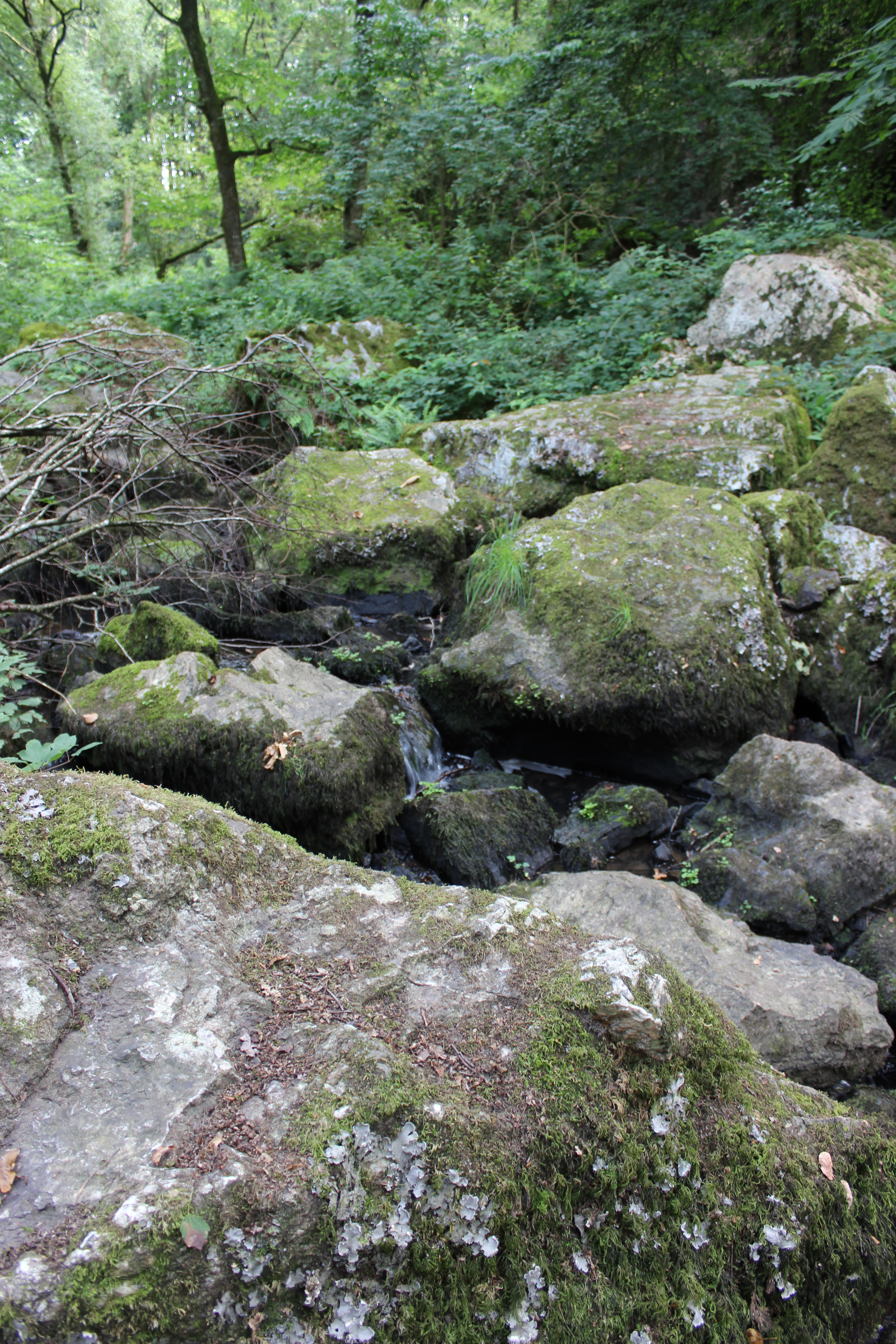
Saut-Roland Canyon, Dompierre-du-Chemin

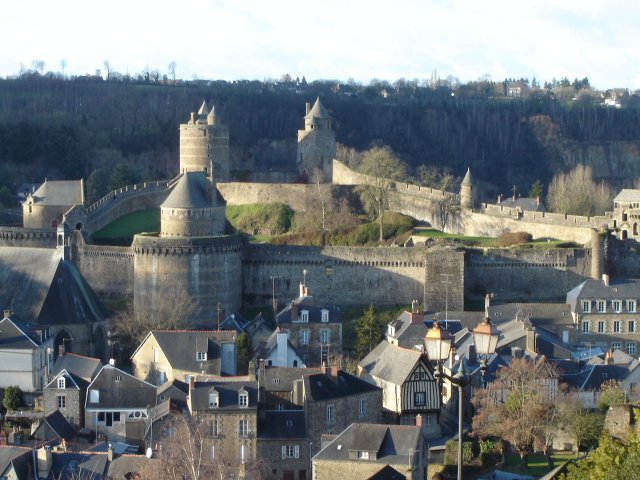
Industrial city of Fougères and château-fort

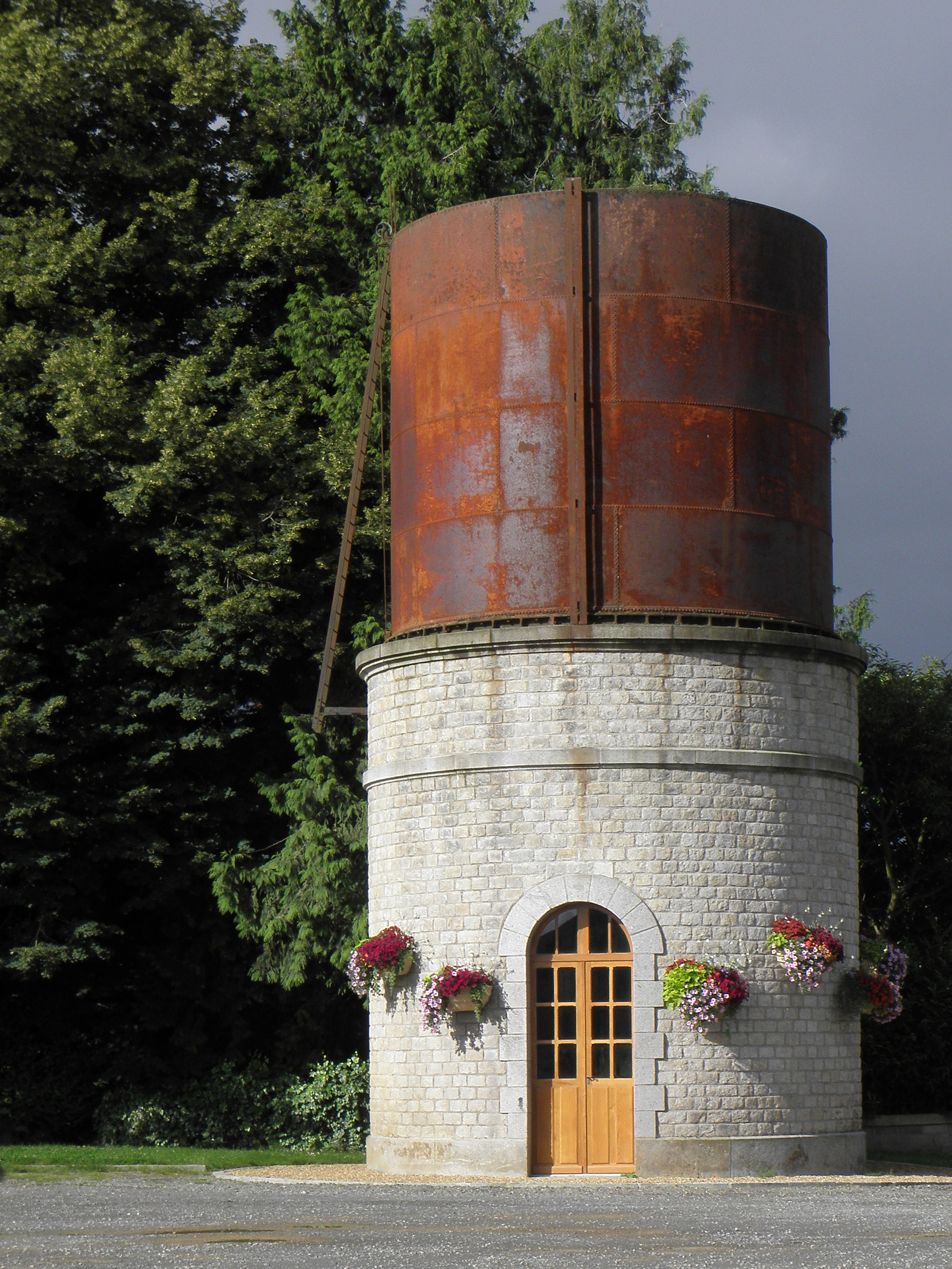
Railway water tower, old station of Maen-Roch

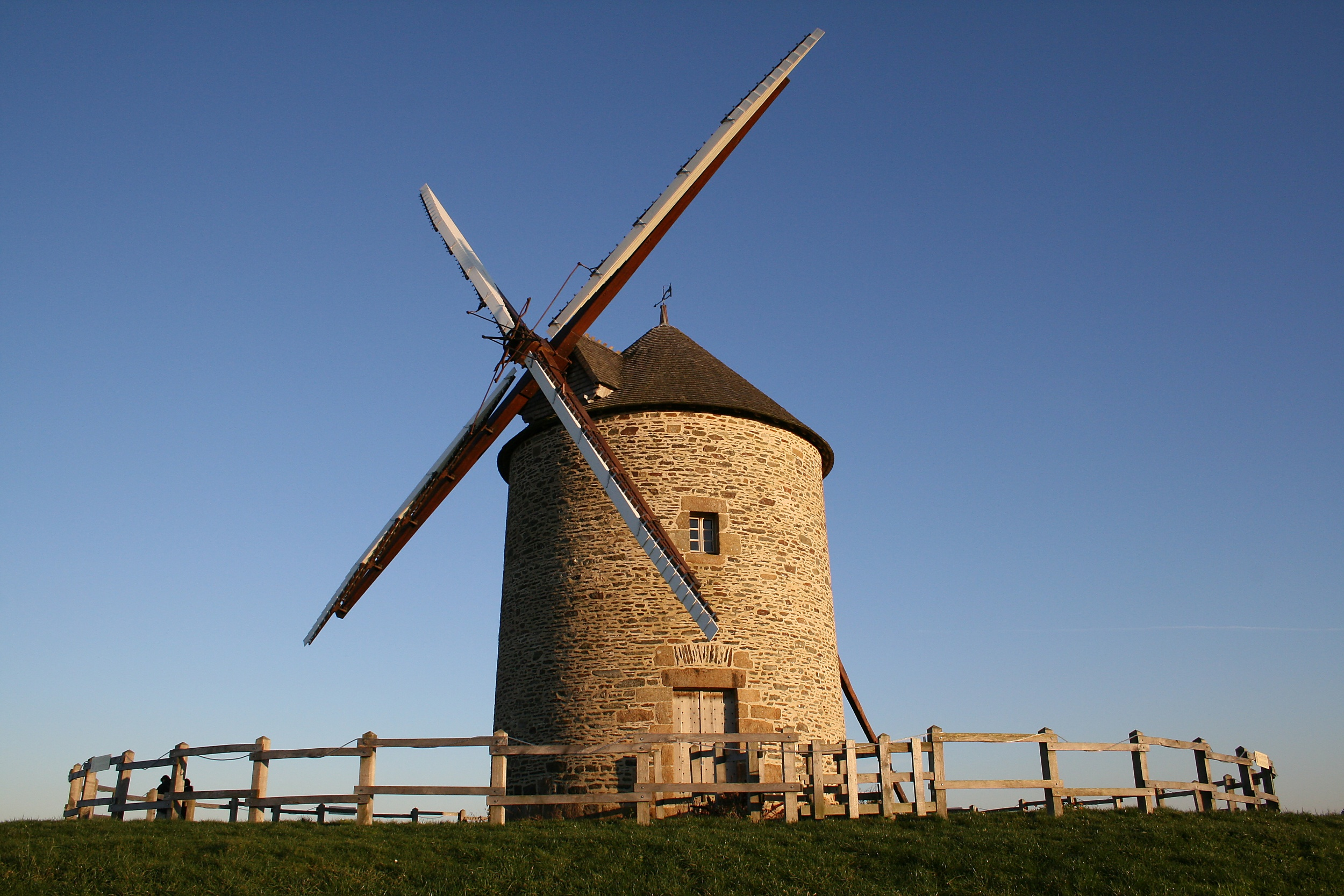
Moulin de Moidrey, Pontorson

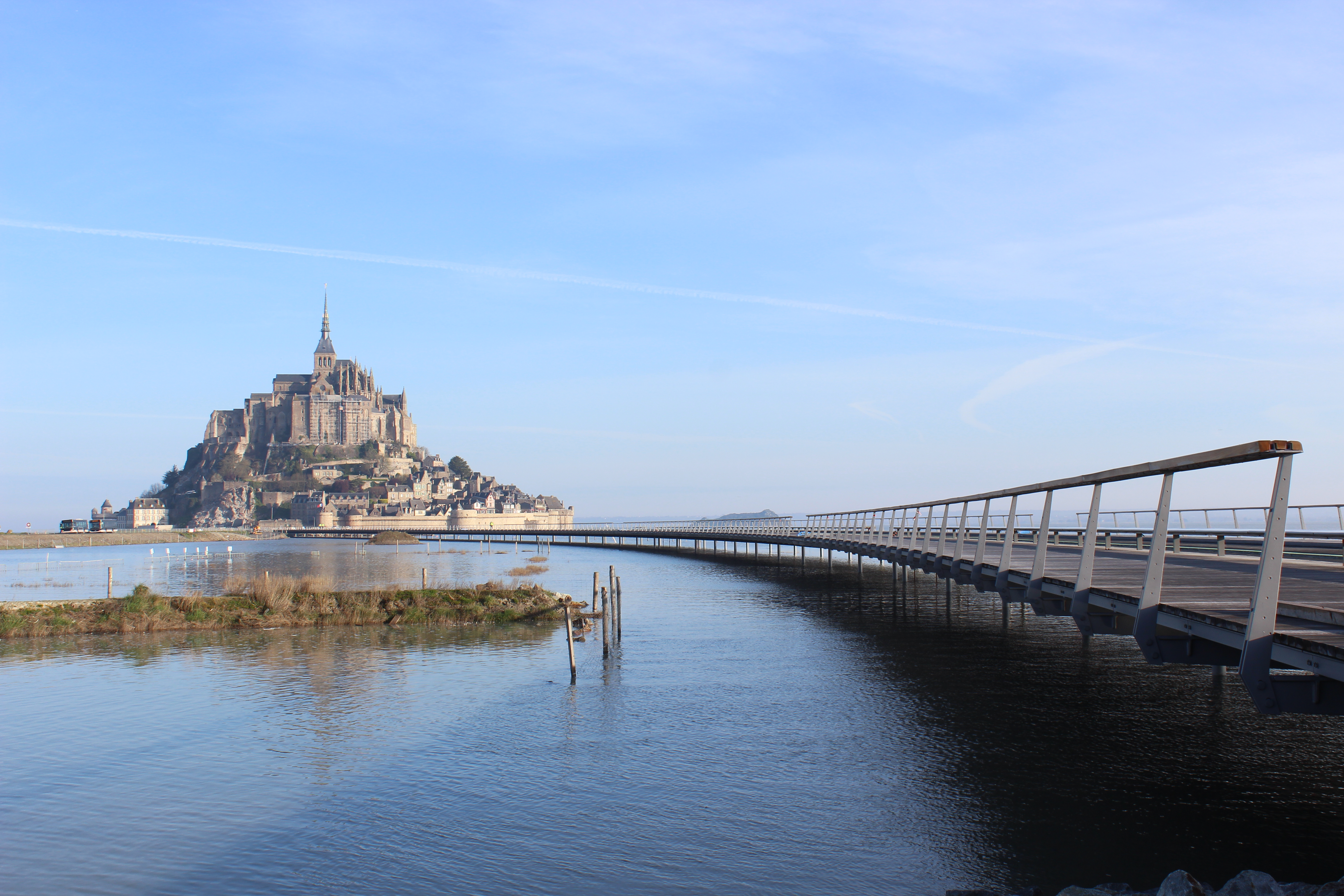
The Gateway of Mont Saint-Michel starting/arrival cycleway la Régalante.
