= Canton of Vitré =

Coordinates: 48.12°N 1.21°W

- Canton
- Country: France
- Region: Brittany
- Department: Ille-et-Vilaine
- No. of communes: {{{nbcomm}}}
- Population (2023): 40,665
- INSEE code: 35 27

The canton of Vitré is an administrative division of the Ille-et-Vilaine department, in northwestern France. It was created at the French canton reorganisation which came into effect in March 2015. Its seat is in Vitré.

It consists of the following communes:

1. Balazé
2. Bréal-sous-Vitré
3. Champeaux
4. La Chapelle-Erbrée
5. Châtillon-en-Vendelais
6. Cornillé
7. Erbrée
8. Landavran
9. Marpiré
10. Mecé
11. Mondevert
12. Montautour
13. Montreuil-des-Landes
14. Montreuil-sous-Pérouse
15. Pocé-les-Bois
16. Princé
17. Saint-Aubin-des-Landes
18. Saint-Christophe-des-Bois
19. Saint-M'Hervé
20. Taillis
21. Val-d'Izé
22. Vitré
