= Val-d'Izé =

Val-d'Izé Nant-Izeg (Breton)
- Commune
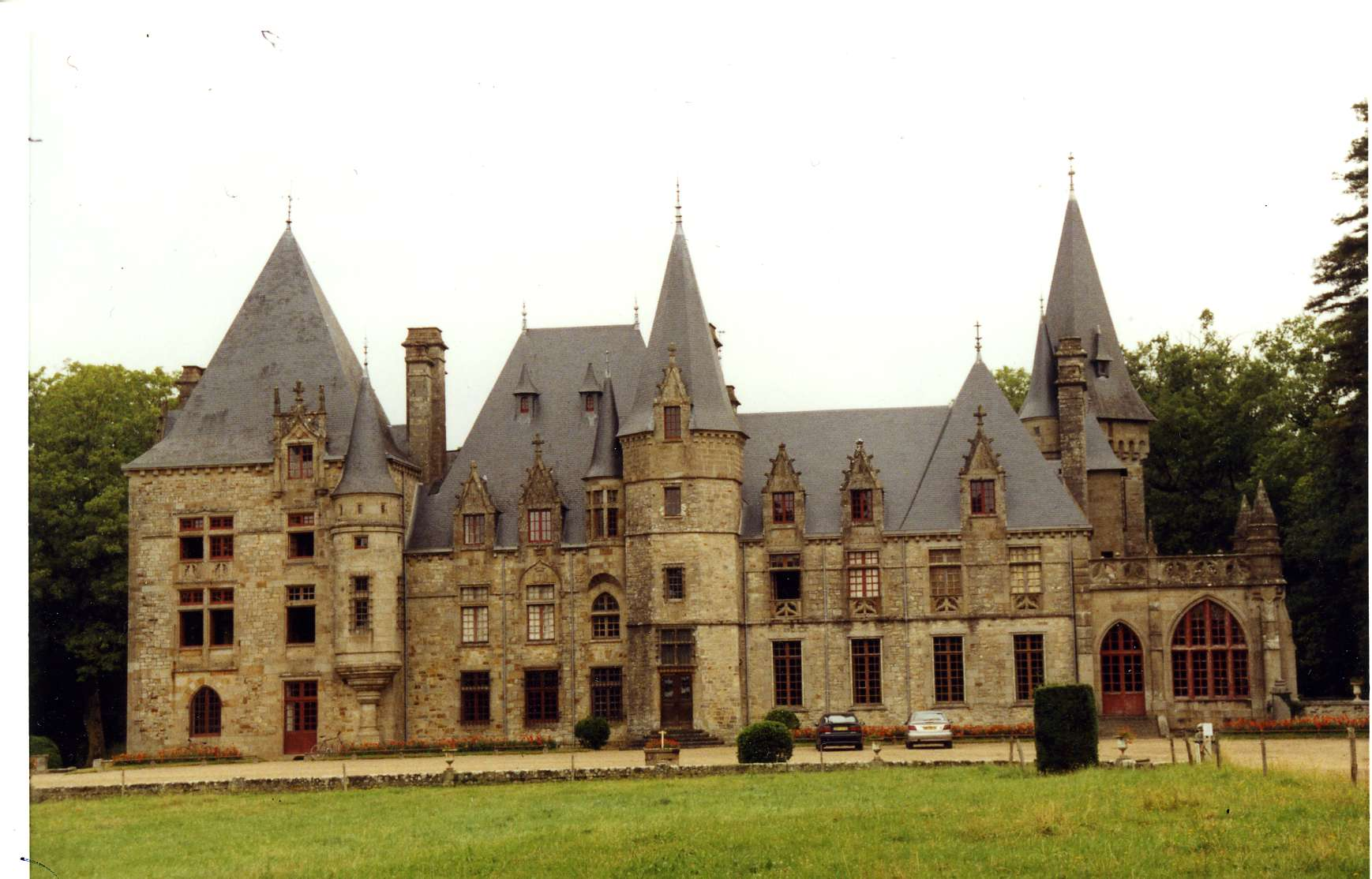
- Château du Bois Cornillé
- Location of Val-d'Izé
- Location within France Location within Brittany
- Coordinates: 48°10′41″N 1°18′12″W
- Country: France
- Region: Brittany
- Department: Ille-et-Vilaine
- Arrondissement: Fougères-Vitré
- Canton: Vitré
- Intercommunality: CA Vitré Communauté

Government
  - Mayor (2020–2026): Bruno Delva
- Area^{1}: 43.79 km^{2} (16.91 sq mi)
- Highest elevation: 129 m (423 ft)
- Lowest elevation: 67 m (220 ft)
- Population (2023): 2,620
  - Density: 59.8/km^{2} (155/sq mi)
- Time zone: UTC+01:00 (CET)
  - Summer (DST): UTC+02:00 (CEST)
- INSEE/Postal code: 35347 /35450
- ^{1} French Land Register data, which excludes lakes, ponds, glaciers > 1 km^{2} (0.386 sq mi or 247 acres) and river estuaries.

Val-d'Izé (French pronunciation: [val dize]; Breton: Nant-Izeg) is a commune in the department of Ille-et-Vilaine in the Brittany Region of northwestern France.

== Population ==
Inhabitants of Val-d'Izé are called Izéens in French.

Historical population
Year	Pop.	±% p.a.
1968	1,631	—
1975	1,575	−0.50%
1982	1,740	+1.43%
1990	1,811	+0.50%
1999	2,082	+1.56%
2007	2,385	+1.71%
2012	2,517	+1.08%
2017	2,590	+0.57%
2023	2,620	+0.19%
Source: INSEE

== See also ==
- Communes of the Ille-et-Vilaine department
