= Vitré Communauté =

Coordinates: 48.12°N 1.21°W

- Communauté d'agglomération
- Country: France
- Region: Brittany
- Department: Ille-et-Vilaine
- No. of communes: {{{nbcomm}}}
- Established: 2002
- Area: 867.7 km^{2} (335.0 sq mi)
- Population (2018): 81,205
  - Density: 93.59/km^{2} (242.4/sq mi)

Vitré Communauté is the communauté d'agglomération, an intercommunal structure, centred on the town of Vitré. It is located in the Ille-et-Vilaine department, in the Bretagne region, northwestern France. It was created in 2002. Its population was 81,205 in 2018, of which 18,267 in Vitré proper. It has an area of 867.7 km^{2}.

== Composition ==
The communauté d'agglomération consists of the following 46 communes:

1. Argentré-du-Plessis
2. Availles-sur-Seiche
3. Bais
4. Balazé
5. Bréal-sous-Vitré
6. Brielles
7. Champeaux
8. La Chapelle-Erbrée
9. Châteaubourg
10. Châtillon-en-Vendelais
11. Cornillé
12. Domagné
13. Domalain
14. Drouges
15. Erbrée
16. Étrelles
17. Gennes-sur-Seiche
18. La Guerche-de-Bretagne
19. Landavran
20. Louvigné-de-Bais
21. Marpiré
22. Mecé
23. Mondevert
24. Montautour
25. Montreuil-des-Landes
26. Montreuil-sous-Pérouse
27. Moulins
28. Moussé
29. Moutiers
30. Le Pertre
31. Pocé-les-Bois
32. Princé
33. Rannée
34. Saint-Aubin-des-Landes
35. Saint-Christophe-des-Bois
36. Saint-Didier
37. Saint-Germain-du-Pinel
38. Saint-Jean-sur-Vilaine
39. Saint-M'Hervé
40. La Selle-Guerchaise
41. Taillis
42. Torcé
43. Val-d'Izé
44. Vergéal
45. Visseiche
46. Vitré

== See also ==
- Agglomeration communities in France
