= Bréal-sous-Vitré =

Bréal-sous-Vitré Breal-Gwitreg (Breton)
- Commune
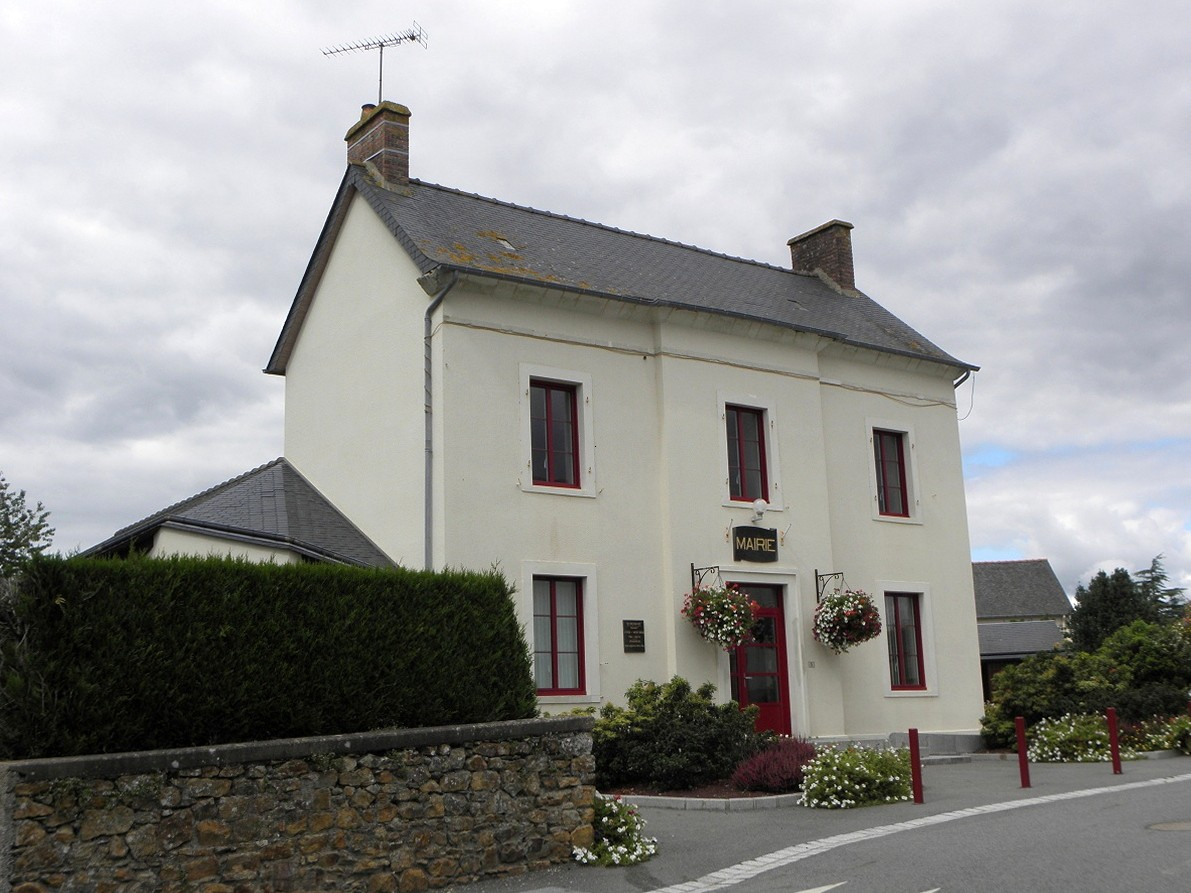
- Town hall
- Location of Bréal-sous-Vitré
- Location within France Location within Brittany
- Coordinates: 48°06′14″N 1°03′36″W
- Country: France
- Region: Brittany
- Department: Ille-et-Vilaine
- Arrondissement: Fougères-Vitré
- Canton: Vitré
- Intercommunality: CA Vitré Communauté

Government
  - Mayor (2020–2026): Pascale Cartron
- Area^{1}: 5.75 km^{2} (2.22 sq mi)
- Highest elevation: 181 m (594 ft)
- Lowest elevation: 110 m (360 ft)
- Population (2023): 612
  - Density: 106/km^{2} (276/sq mi)
- Time zone: UTC+01:00 (CET)
  - Summer (DST): UTC+02:00 (CEST)
- INSEE/Postal code: 35038 /35370
- ^{1} French Land Register data, which excludes lakes, ponds, glaciers > 1 km^{2} (0.386 sq mi or 247 acres) and river estuaries.

Bréal-sous-Vitré (French pronunciation: [bʁeal su vitʁe], literally Bréal under Vitré; Breton: Breal-Gwitreg) is a commune in the Ille-et-Vilaine department in Brittany in northwestern France.

== Population ==
Inhabitants of Bréal-sous-Vitré are called Bréalais in French.

Historical population
Year	Pop.	±% p.a.
1968	424	—
1975	407	−0.58%
1982	409	+0.07%
1990	496	+2.44%
1999	530	+0.74%
2007	641	+2.41%
2012	667	+0.80%
2017	646	−0.64%
2023	612	−0.90%
Source: INSEE

== See also ==
- Communes of the Ille-et-Vilaine department
