= Mecé =

Mecé Maczaé (Gallo) Mezieg (Breton)
- Commune
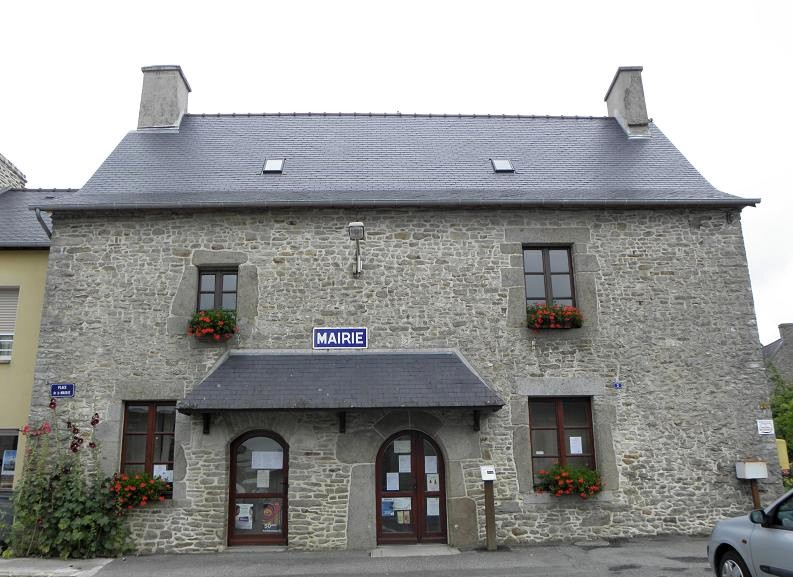
- The town hall of Mecé
- Location of Mecé
- Location within France Location within Brittany
- Coordinates: 48°14′15″N 1°18′05″W
- Country: France
- Region: Brittany
- Department: Ille-et-Vilaine
- Arrondissement: Fougères-Vitré
- Canton: Vitré
- Intercommunality: CA Vitré Communauté

Government
  - Mayor (2020–2026): Jean-Luc Delaunay
- Area^{1}: 15.63 km^{2} (6.03 sq mi)
- Highest elevation: 132 m (433 ft)
- Lowest elevation: 85 m (279 ft)
- Population (2023): 618
  - Density: 39.5/km^{2} (102/sq mi)
- Time zone: UTC+01:00 (CET)
  - Summer (DST): UTC+02:00 (CEST)
- INSEE/Postal code: 35170 /35450
- ^{1} French Land Register data, which excludes lakes, ponds, glaciers > 1 km^{2} (0.386 sq mi or 247 acres) and river estuaries.

Mecé (French pronunciation: [məse]; Breton: Mezieg; Gallo: Meczaé) is a commune in the Ille-et-Vilaine department of Brittany in northwestern France.

== Population ==
Inhabitants of Mecé are called Mecéens in French.

Historical population
Year	Pop.	±% p.a.
1968	581	—
1975	487	−2.49%
1982	446	−1.25%
1990	394	−1.54%
1999	468	+1.93%
2007	540	+1.80%
2012	584	+1.58%
2017	608	+0.81%
2023	618	+0.27%
Source: INSEE

== See also ==
- Communes of the Ille-et-Vilaine department
