= Saint-Aubin-des-Landes =

Saint-Aubin-des-Landes Sant-Abin-al-Lann (Breton)
- Commune
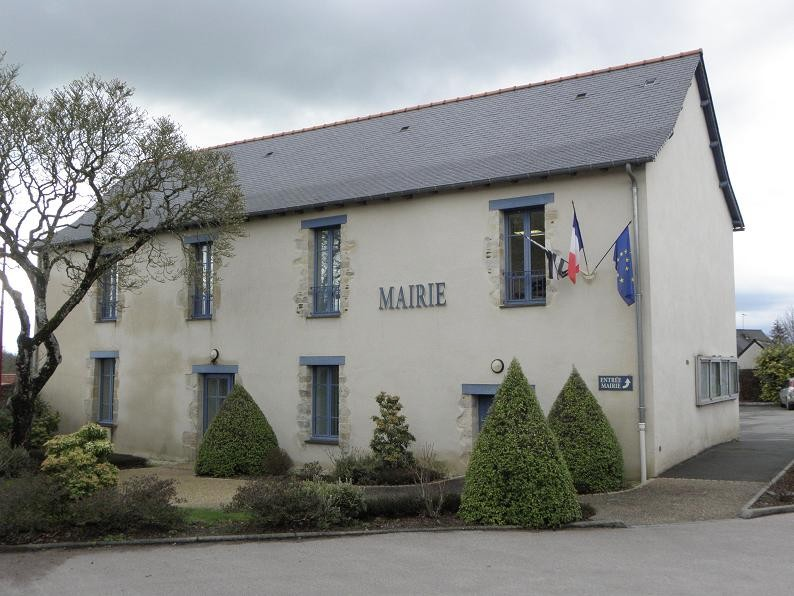
- The town hall of Saint-Aubin-des-Landes
- Location of Saint-Aubin-des-Landes
- Location within France Location within Brittany
- Coordinates: 48°05′42″N 1°17′39″W
- Country: France
- Region: Brittany
- Department: Ille-et-Vilaine
- Arrondissement: Fougères-Vitré
- Canton: Vitré
- Intercommunality: CA Vitré Communauté

Government
  - Mayor (2020–2026): Christophe Fesselier
- Area^{1}: 10.28 km^{2} (3.97 sq mi)
- Highest elevation: 105 m (344 ft)
- Lowest elevation: 45 m (148 ft)
- Population (2023): 917
  - Density: 89.2/km^{2} (231/sq mi)
- Time zone: UTC+01:00 (CET)
  - Summer (DST): UTC+02:00 (CEST)
- INSEE/Postal code: 35252 /35500
- ^{1} French Land Register data, which excludes lakes, ponds, glaciers > 1 km^{2} (0.386 sq mi or 247 acres) and river estuaries.

Saint-Aubin-des-Landes (French pronunciation: [sɛ̃.t‿obɛ̃ de lɑ̃d]; Breton: Sant-Albin-al-Lann) is a commune in the Ille-et-Vilaine department in Brittany in northwestern France.

== Population ==
Inhabitants of Saint-Aubin-des-Landes are called saint-aubinois in French.

Historical population
Year	Pop.	±% p.a.
1968	506	—
1975	515	+0.25%
1982	636	+3.06%
1990	723	+1.62%
1999	871	+2.09%
2007	901	+0.42%
2012	907	+0.13%
2017	948	+0.89%
2023	917	−0.55%
Source: INSEE

== See also ==
- Communes of the Ille-et-Vilaine department
