= Saint-Christophe-des-Bois =

Saint-Christophe-des-Bois Sant-Kristol-ar-C'hoad (Breton)
- Commune
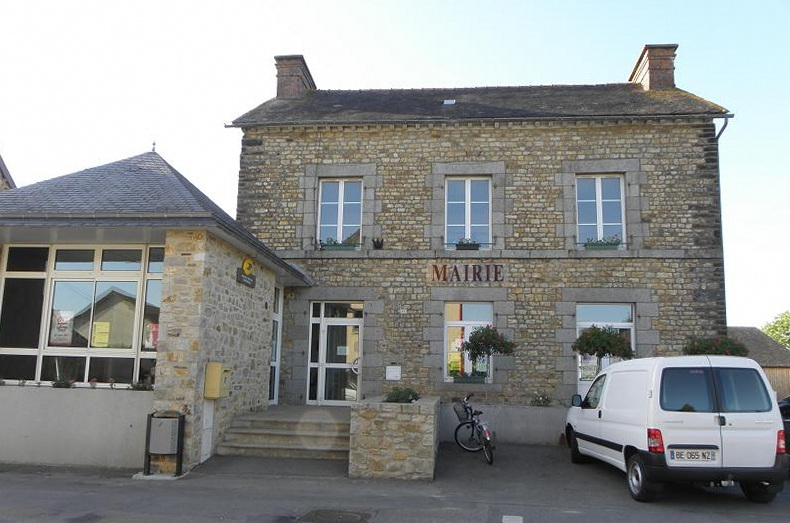
- The town hall of Saint-Christophe-des-Bois
- Location of Saint-Christophe-des-Bois
- Location within France Location within Brittany
- Coordinates: 48°13′38″N 1°14′47″W
- Country: France
- Region: Brittany
- Department: Ille-et-Vilaine
- Arrondissement: Fougères-Vitré
- Canton: Vitré
- Intercommunality: CA Vitré Communauté

Government
  - Mayor (2020–2026): Yves Guérin
- Area^{1}: 9.26 km^{2} (3.58 sq mi)
- Highest elevation: 136 m (446 ft)
- Lowest elevation: 99 m (325 ft)
- Population (2023): 566
  - Density: 61.1/km^{2} (158/sq mi)
- Time zone: UTC+01:00 (CET)
  - Summer (DST): UTC+02:00 (CEST)
- INSEE/Postal code: 35260 /35210
- ^{1} French Land Register data, which excludes lakes, ponds, glaciers > 1 km^{2} (0.386 sq mi or 247 acres) and river estuaries.

Saint-Christophe-des-Bois (French pronunciation: [sɛ̃ kʁistɔf de bwa]; Breton: Sant-Kristol-ar-C'hoad) is a commune in the Ille-et-Vilaine department in Brittany in northwestern France.

== Population ==
Inhabitants of Saint-Christophe-des-Bois are called christophéens in French.

Historical population
| Year | Pop. | ±% p.a. |
|---|---|---|
| 1968 | 473 | — |
| 1975 | 430 | −1.35% |
| 1982 | 420 | −0.34% |
| 1990 | 467 | +1.33% |
| 1999 | 475 | +0.19% |
| 2007 | 502 | +0.69% |
| 2012 | 561 | +2.25% |
| 2017 | 574 | +0.46% |
| 2023 | 566 | −0.23% |
Source: INSEE

== See also ==
- Communes of the Ille-et-Vilaine department
