= Montautour =

Montautour Menezaoter (Breton)
- Commune
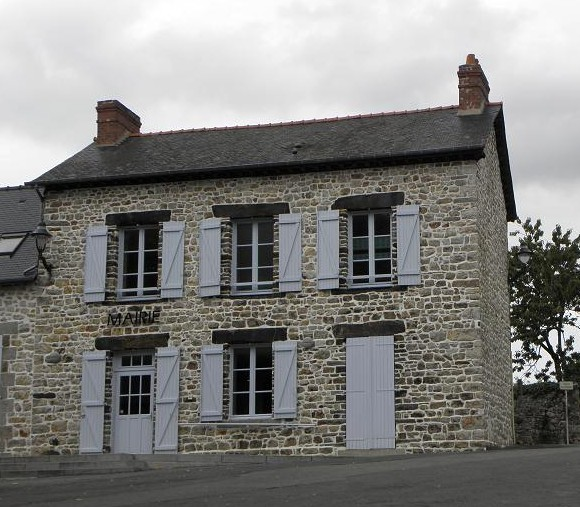
- The town hall of Montautour
- Location of Montautour
- Location within France Location within Brittany
- Coordinates: 48°12′16″N 1°08′45″W
- Country: France
- Region: Brittany
- Department: Ille-et-Vilaine
- Arrondissement: Fougères-Vitré
- Canton: Vitré
- Intercommunality: CA Vitré Communauté

Government
  - Mayor (2020–2026): Thierry Mongodin
- Area^{1}: 6.90 km^{2} (2.66 sq mi)
- Highest elevation: 194 m (636 ft)
- Lowest elevation: 105 m (344 ft)
- Population (2023): 269
  - Density: 39.0/km^{2} (101/sq mi)
- Time zone: UTC+01:00 (CET)
  - Summer (DST): UTC+02:00 (CEST)
- INSEE/Postal code: 35185 /35210
- ^{1} French Land Register data, which excludes lakes, ponds, glaciers > 1 km^{2} (0.386 sq mi or 247 acres) and river estuaries.

Montautour (French pronunciation: [mɔ̃totuʁ]; Breton: Menezaoter) is a commune in the Ille-et-Vilaine department of Brittany in northwestern France.

== Population ==
Inhabitants of Montautour are called in French montaltoriens.

Historical population
Year	Pop.	±% p.a.
1968	255	—
1975	226	−1.71%
1982	240	+0.86%
1990	242	+0.10%
1999	240	−0.09%
2007	255	+0.76%
2012	262	+0.54%
2017	264	+0.15%
2023	269	+0.31%
Source: INSEE

== See also ==
- Communes of the Ille-et-Vilaine department
