= Mondevert =

Mondevert Mondevèrt (Gallo) Mondeverzh (Breton)
- Commune
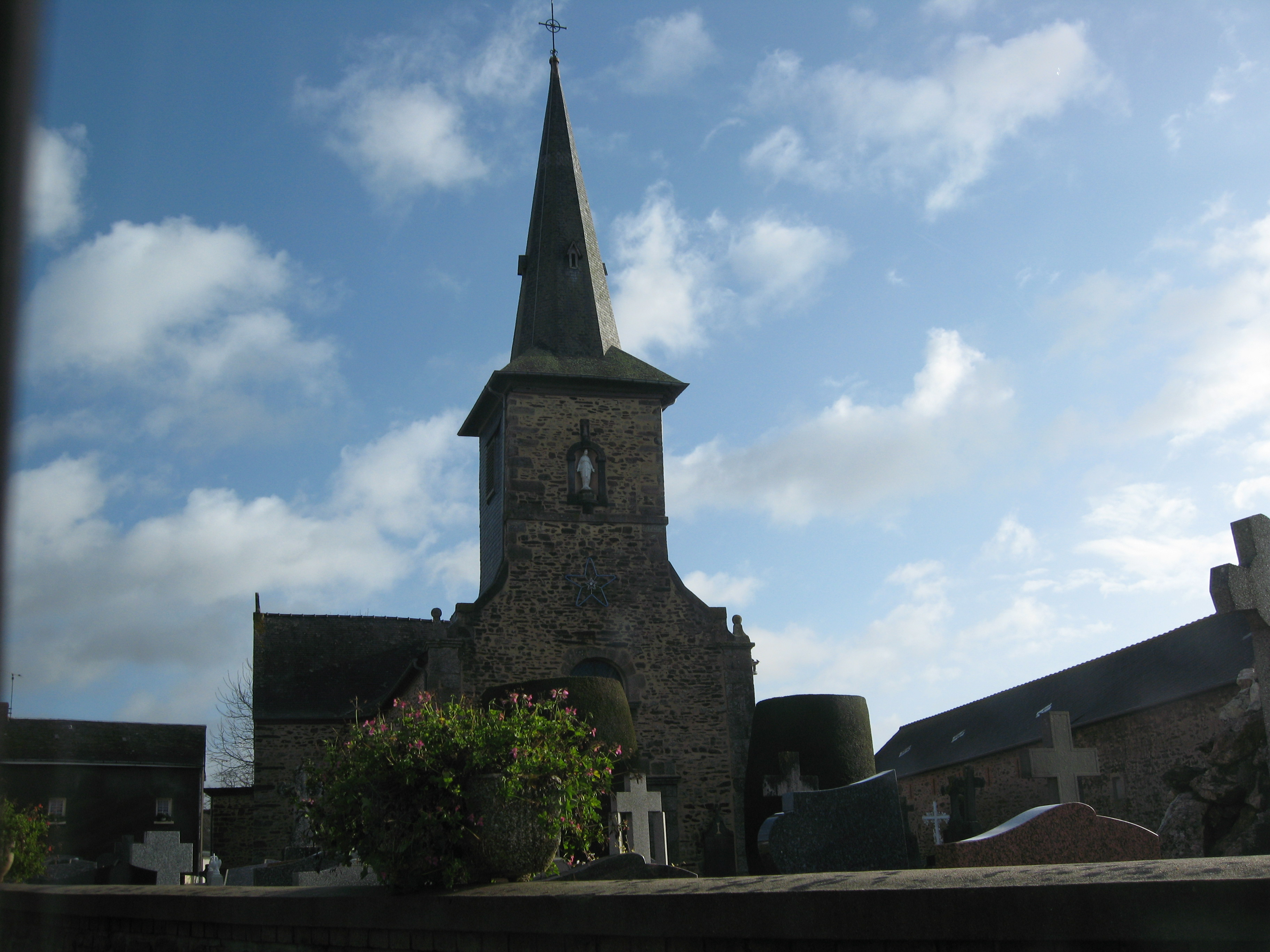
- The church of Sainte-Marie-Madeleine
- Location of Mondevert
- Location within France Location within Brittany
- Coordinates: 48°05′06″N 1°05′52″W
- Country: France
- Region: Brittany
- Department: Ille-et-Vilaine
- Arrondissement: Fougères-Vitré
- Canton: Vitré
- Intercommunality: CA Vitré Communauté

Government
  - Mayor (2020–2026): Christian Stéphan
- Area^{1}: 5.02 km^{2} (1.94 sq mi)
- Highest elevation: 142 m (466 ft)
- Lowest elevation: 107 m (351 ft)
- Population (2023): 804
  - Density: 160/km^{2} (415/sq mi)
- Time zone: UTC+01:00 (CET)
  - Summer (DST): UTC+02:00 (CEST)
- INSEE/Postal code: 35183 /35370
- ^{1} French Land Register data, which excludes lakes, ponds, glaciers > 1 km^{2} (0.386 sq mi or 247 acres) and river estuaries.

Mondevert (French pronunciation: [mɔ̃dvɛʁ]; Breton: Mondeverzh; Gallo: Mondevèrt) is a commune in the Ille-et-Vilaine department of Brittany in northwestern France.

== Population ==
Inhabitants of Mondevert are called Mondevertais in French.

Historical population
Year	Pop.	±% p.a.
1968	315	—
1975	318	+0.14%
1982	357	+1.67%
1990	458	+3.16%
1999	576	+2.58%
2007	735	+3.09%
2012	800	+1.71%
2017	819	+0.47%
2023	804	−0.31%
Source: INSEE

== See also ==
- Communes of the Ille-et-Vilaine department
