= Balazé =

Balazé Balazae (Gallo) Belezeg (Breton)
- Commune
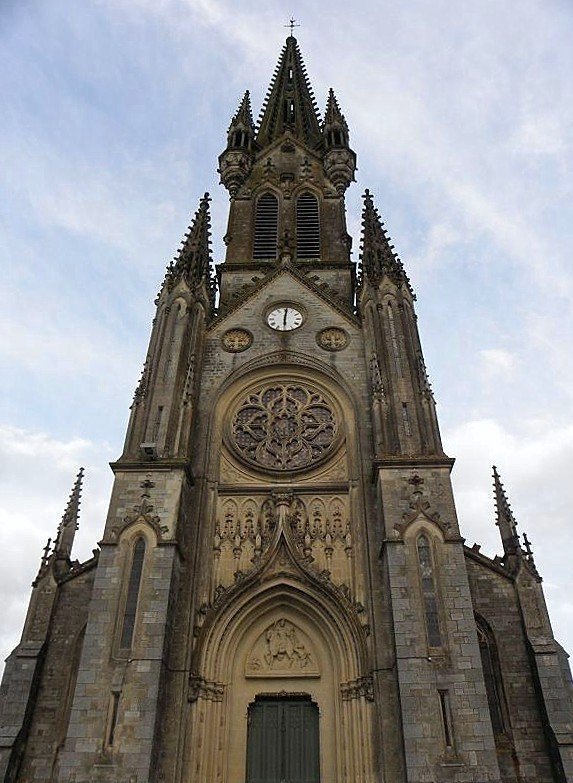
- Saint-Martin of Balazé Church

- Coat of arms
- Location of Balazé
- Location within France Location within Brittany
- Coordinates: 48°10′11″N 1°11′26″W
- Country: France
- Region: Brittany
- Department: Ille-et-Vilaine
- Arrondissement: Fougères-Vitré
- Canton: Vitré
- Intercommunality: CA Vitré Communauté

Government
  - Mayor (2020–2026): Stéphane Douabin
- Area^{1}: 36.66 km^{2} (14.15 sq mi)
- Highest elevation: 169 m (554 ft)
- Lowest elevation: 70 m (230 ft)
- Population (2023): 2,162
  - Density: 58.97/km^{2} (152.7/sq mi)
- Time zone: UTC+01:00 (CET)
  - Summer (DST): UTC+02:00 (CEST)
- INSEE/Postal code: 35015 /35500
- ^{1} French Land Register data, which excludes lakes, ponds, glaciers > 1 km^{2} (0.386 sq mi or 247 acres) and river estuaries.

Balazé (French pronunciation: [balaze]; Breton: Belezeg; Gallo: Balazae) is a commune in the Ille-et-Vilaine department in the Brittany region in northwestern France.

== Population ==
Historical population
Year	Pop.	±% p.a.
1968	1,268	—
1975	1,372	+1.13%
1982	1,512	+1.40%
1990	1,711	+1.56%
1999	1,914	+1.25%
2007	2,083	+1.06%
2012	2,245	+1.51%
2017	2,228	−0.15%
2023	2,162	−0.50%
Source: INSEE

Inhabitants of Balazé are called Balazéens in French.

== Gallery ==
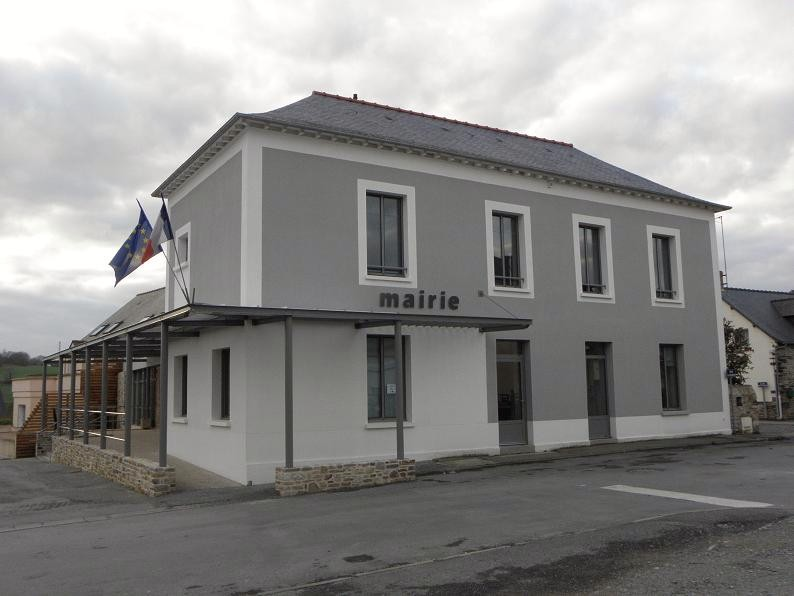
Town hall

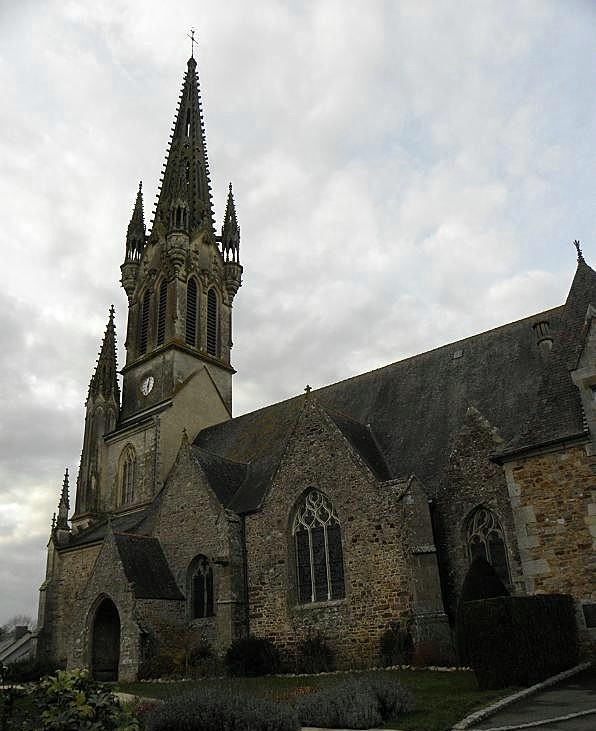
Saint-Martin of Balazé Church

== See also ==
- Communes of the Ille-et-Vilaine department
