= Princé =

Princé Priskieg (Breton)
- Commune
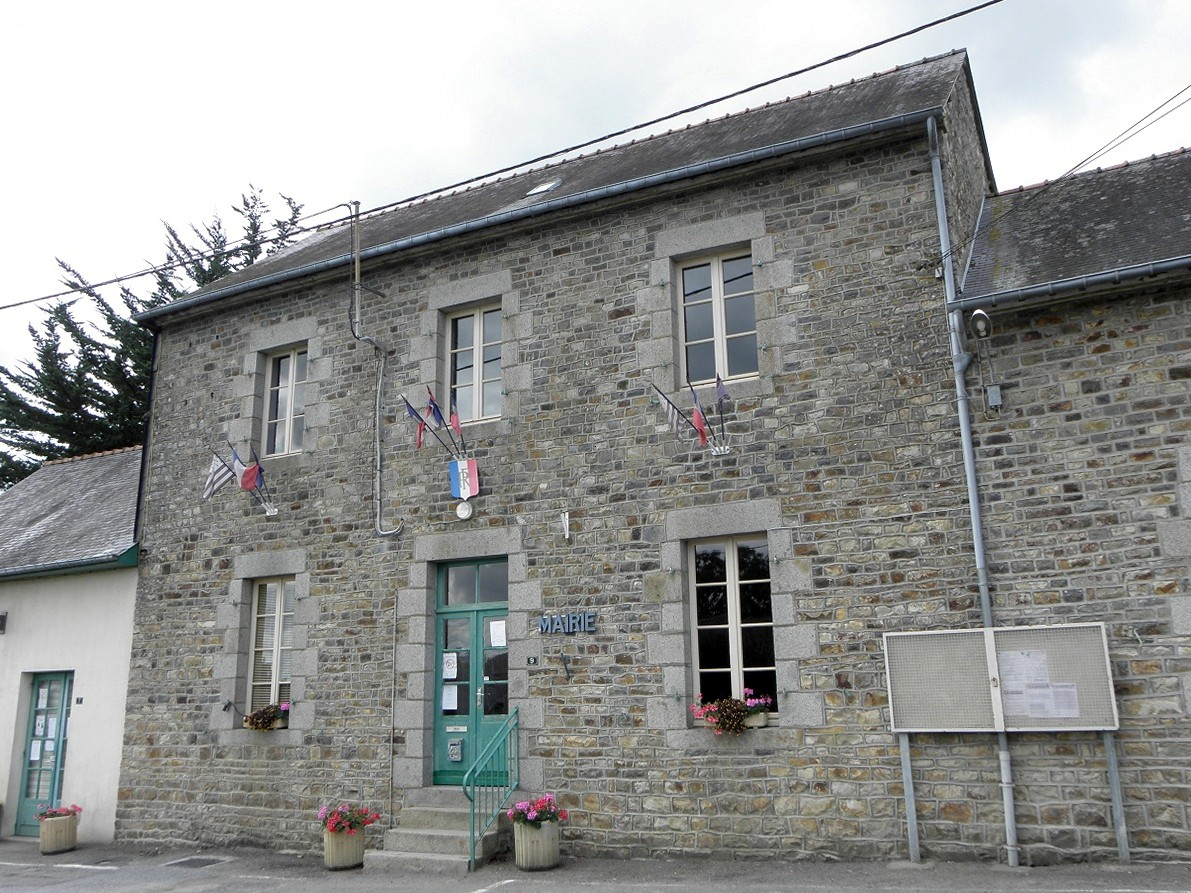
- The town hall in Princé
- Location of Princé
- Location within France Location within Brittany
- Coordinates: 48°13′02″N 1°05′12″W
- Country: France
- Region: Brittany
- Department: Ille-et-Vilaine
- Arrondissement: Rennes
- Canton: Vitré
- Intercommunality: CA Vitré Communauté

Government
  - Mayor (2023–2026): Jean-Claude Denouault
- Area^{1}: 12.36 km^{2} (4.77 sq mi)
- Highest elevation: 188 m (617 ft)
- Lowest elevation: 113 m (371 ft)
- Population (2023): 400
  - Density: 32/km^{2} (84/sq mi)
- Time zone: UTC+01:00 (CET)
  - Summer (DST): UTC+02:00 (CEST)
- INSEE/Postal code: 35232 /35210
- ^{1} French Land Register data, which excludes lakes, ponds, glaciers > 1 km^{2} (0.386 sq mi or 247 acres) and river estuaries.

Princé (French pronunciation: [pʁɛ̃se]; Breton: Priskieg) is a commune in the Ille-et-Vilaine department of Brittany in northwestern France.

== Population ==
Inhabitants of Princé are called princéens in French.

Historical population
Year	Pop.	±% p.a.
1968	509	—
1975	460	−1.44%
1982	393	−2.22%
1990	346	−1.58%
1999	333	−0.42%
2007	355	+0.80%
2012	374	+1.05%
2017	380	+0.32%
2023	400	+0.86%
Source: INSEE

== See also ==
- Communes of the Ille-et-Vilaine department
