= Landavran =

Landavran Landavran
- Commune
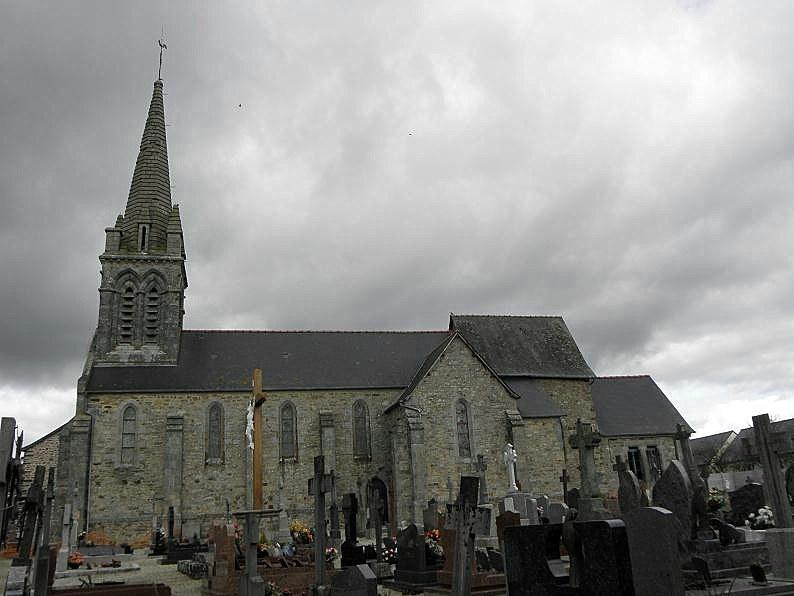
- The church of Notre-Dame
- Location of Landavran
- Location within France Location within Brittany
- Coordinates: 48°09′35″N 1°17′18″W
- Country: France
- Region: Brittany
- Department: Ille-et-Vilaine
- Arrondissement: Fougères-Vitré
- Canton: Vitré
- Intercommunality: CA Vitré Communauté

Government
  - Mayor (2020–2026): Danielle Résonet
- Area^{1}: 5.01 km^{2} (1.93 sq mi)
- Highest elevation: 127 m (417 ft)
- Lowest elevation: 68 m (223 ft)
- Population (2023): 674
  - Density: 135/km^{2} (348/sq mi)
- Time zone: UTC+01:00 (CET)
  - Summer (DST): UTC+02:00 (CEST)
- INSEE/Postal code: 35141 /35450
- ^{1} French Land Register data, which excludes lakes, ponds, glaciers > 1 km^{2} (0.386 sq mi or 247 acres) and river estuaries.

Landavran (French pronunciation: [lɑ̃davʁɑ̃]; Breton: Landavran) is a commune in the Ille-et-Vilaine department of Brittany in northwestern France.

== Population ==
Inhabitants of Landavran are called Landavranais in French.

Historical population
Year	Pop.	±% p.a.
1968	226	—
1975	229	+0.19%
1982	239	+0.61%
1990	330	+4.12%
1999	399	+2.13%
2007	556	+4.23%
2012	664	+3.61%
2017	692	+0.83%
2023	674	−0.44%
Source: INSEE

== See also ==
- Communes of the Ille-et-Vilaine department
