= Cornillé =

Cornillé Kornilieg (Breton)
- Commune
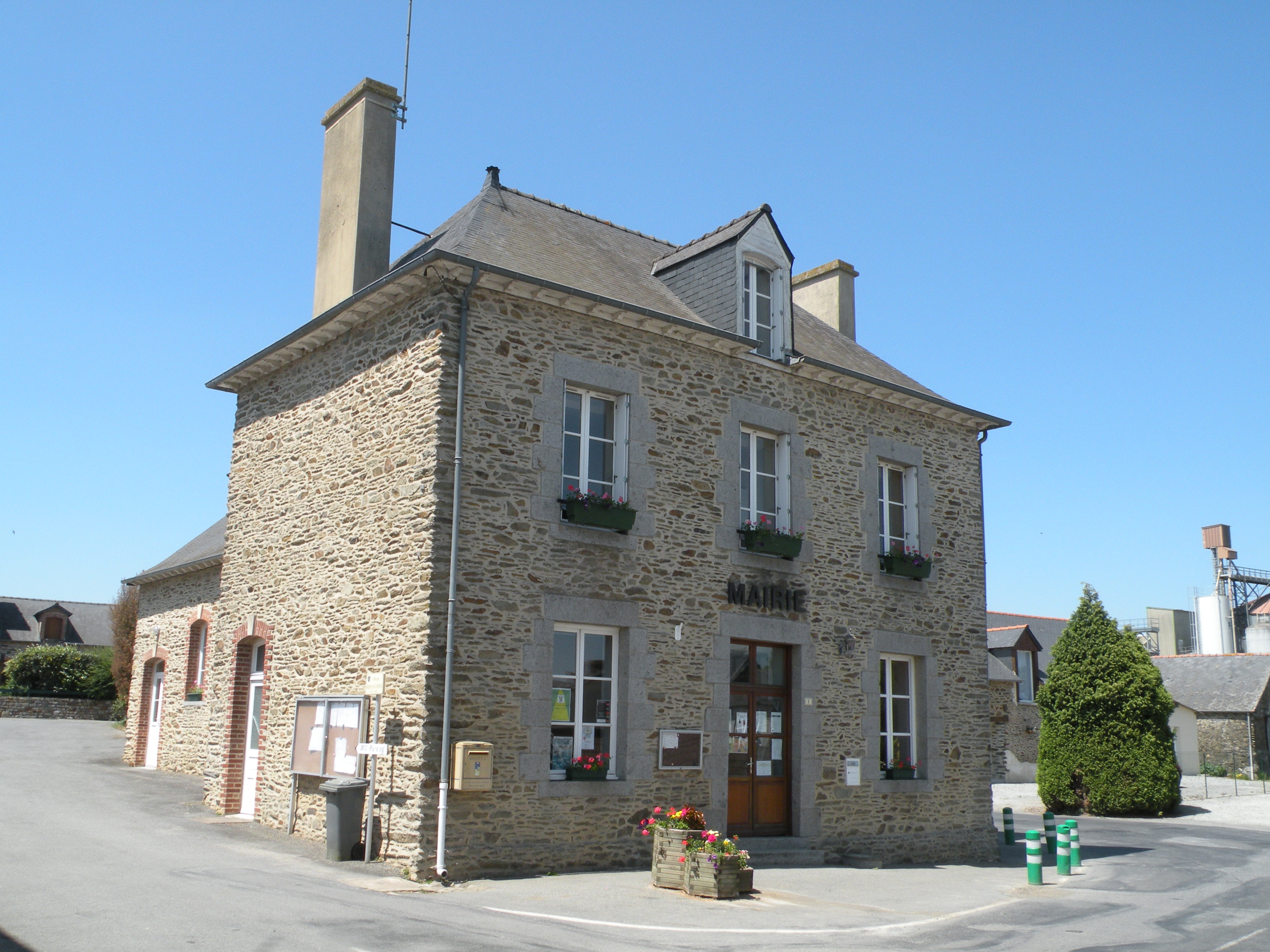
- Town hall

- Coat of arms
- Location of Cornillé
- Location within France Location within Brittany
- Coordinates: 48°04′51″N 1°18′20″W
- Country: France
- Region: Brittany
- Department: Ille-et-Vilaine
- Arrondissement: Fougères-Vitré
- Canton: Vitré
- Intercommunality: CA Vitré Communauté

Government
  - Mayor (2020–2026): André Bouthemy
- Area^{1}: 12.47 km^{2} (4.81 sq mi)
- Highest elevation: 107 m (351 ft)
- Lowest elevation: 45 m (148 ft)
- Population (2023): 961
  - Density: 77.1/km^{2} (200/sq mi)
- Time zone: UTC+01:00 (CET)
  - Summer (DST): UTC+02:00 (CEST)
- INSEE/Postal code: 35087 /35500
- ^{1} French Land Register data, which excludes lakes, ponds, glaciers > 1 km^{2} (0.386 sq mi or 247 acres) and river estuaries.

Cornillé (Breton: Kornilieg) is a commune in the Ille-et-Vilaine department in Brittany in northwestern France.

== Population ==
Historical population
Year	Pop.	±% p.a.
1968	555	—
1975	524	−0.82%
1982	532	+0.22%
1990	572	+0.91%
1999	663	+1.65%
2007	839	+2.99%
2012	925	+1.97%
2017	966	+0.87%
2023	961	−0.09%
Source: INSEE

== See also ==
- Communes of the Ille-et-Vilaine department
