= La Chapelle-Erbrée =

La Chapelle-Erbrée Ar Chapel-Ervoreg (Breton)
- Commune
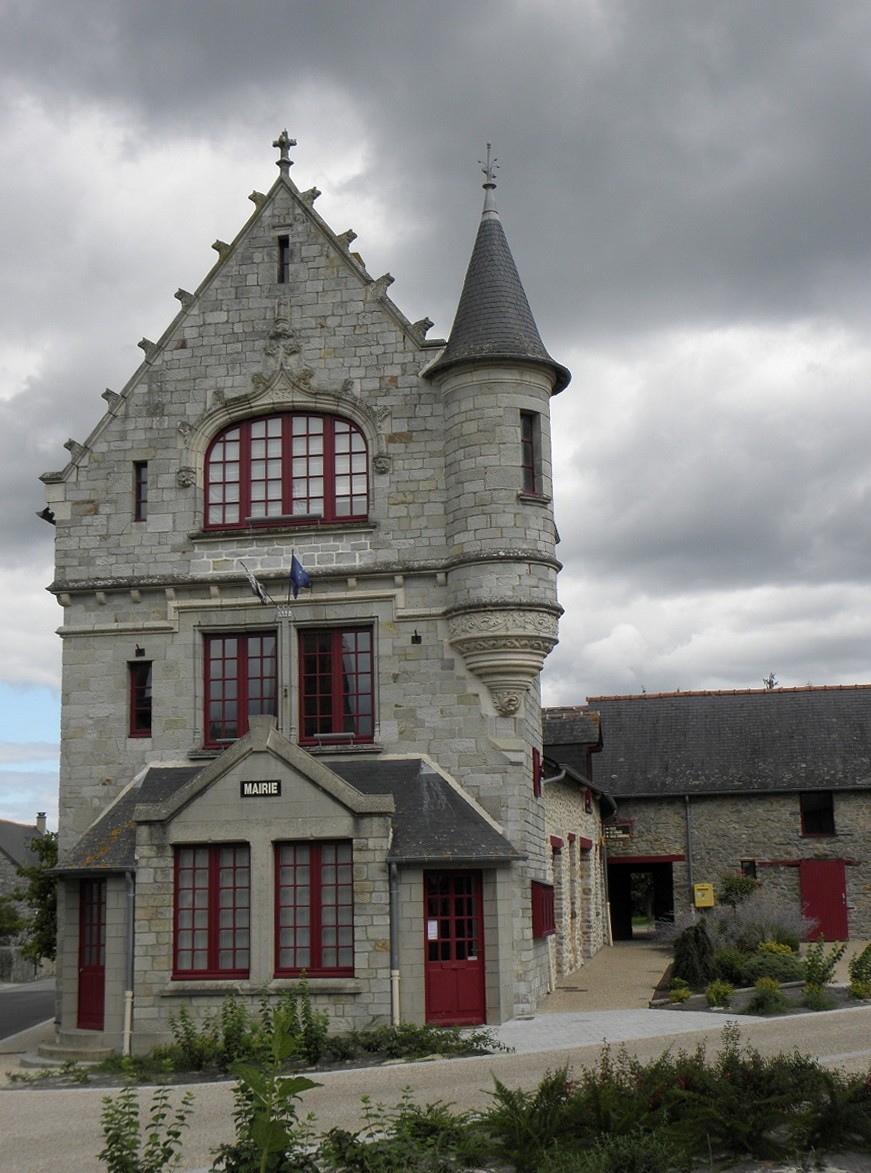
- Town hall
- Location of La Chapelle-Erbrée
- Location within France Location within Brittany
- Coordinates: 48°08′31″N 1°05′57″W
- Country: France
- Region: Brittany
- Department: Ille-et-Vilaine
- Arrondissement: Fougères-Vitré
- Canton: Vitré
- Intercommunality: CA Vitré Communauté

Government
  - Mayor (2020–2026): Joël Travers
- Area^{1}: 11.98 km^{2} (4.63 sq mi)
- Highest elevation: 167 m (548 ft)
- Lowest elevation: 77 m (253 ft)
- Population (2023): 717
  - Density: 59.8/km^{2} (155/sq mi)
- Time zone: UTC+01:00 (CET)
  - Summer (DST): UTC+02:00 (CEST)
- INSEE/Postal code: 35061 /35500
- ^{1} French Land Register data, which excludes lakes, ponds, glaciers > 1 km^{2} (0.386 sq mi or 247 acres) and river estuaries.

La Chapelle-Erbrée (French pronunciation: [la ʃapɛl ɛʁbʁe]; Breton: Ar Chapel-Ervoreg) is a commune in the Ille-et-Vilaine department of Brittany in north-western France.

== Population ==
People from La Chapelle-Erbrée are called in French capellois, although the term is commonly applied to people from many other places with "Chapelle" in their names.

Historical population
| Year | Pop. | ±% p.a. |
|---|---|---|
| 1968 | 507 | — |
| 1975 | 405 | −3.16% |
| 1982 | 414 | +0.31% |
| 1990 | 465 | +1.46% |
| 1999 | 450 | −0.36% |
| 2007 | 584 | +3.31% |
| 2012 | 647 | +2.07% |
| 2017 | 698 | +1.53% |
| 2023 | 717 | +0.45% |
Source: INSEE

== See also ==
- Communes of the Ille-et-Vilaine department
