= Pocé-les-Bois =

Pocé-les-Bois Poczaé (Gallo) Pozieg (Breton)
- Commune
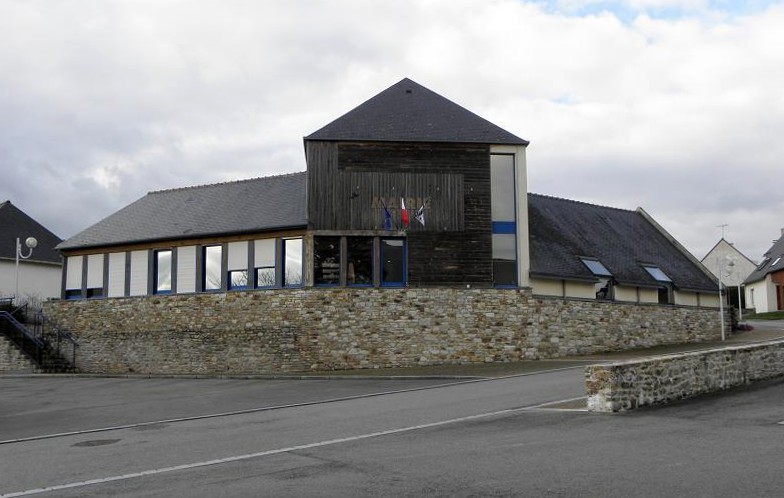
- The town hall of Pocé-les-Bois
- Location of Pocé-les-Bois
- Location within France Location within Brittany
- Coordinates: 48°06′59″N 1°14′55″W
- Country: France
- Region: Brittany
- Department: Ille-et-Vilaine
- Arrondissement: Fougères-Vitré
- Canton: Vitré
- Intercommunality: CA Vitré Communauté

Government
  - Mayor (2020–2026): Frédéric Martin
- Area^{1}: 14.84 km^{2} (5.73 sq mi)
- Highest elevation: 112 m (367 ft)
- Lowest elevation: 47 m (154 ft)
- Population (2023): 1,312
  - Density: 88.41/km^{2} (229.0/sq mi)
- Time zone: UTC+01:00 (CET)
  - Summer (DST): UTC+02:00 (CEST)
- INSEE/Postal code: 35229 /35500
- ^{1} French Land Register data, which excludes lakes, ponds, glaciers > 1 km^{2} (0.386 sq mi or 247 acres) and river estuaries.

Pocé-les-Bois (French pronunciation: [pɔse le bwa]; Gallo: Poczaé, Breton: Pozieg) is a commune in the Ille-et-Vilaine department of Brittany in northwestern France.

== Population ==
Inhabitants of Pocé-les-Bois are called in French pocéens.

Historical population
Year	Pop.	±% p.a.
1968	478	—
1975	553	+2.10%
1982	637	+2.04%
1990	729	+1.70%
1999	971	+3.24%
2007	1,036	+0.81%
2012	1,191	+2.83%
2017	1,293	+1.66%
2023	1,312	+0.24%
Source: INSEE

== See also ==
- Communes of the Ille-et-Vilaine department
