= Champeaux, Ille-et-Vilaine =

Champeaux Champiao (Gallo) Kampal (Breton)
- Commune
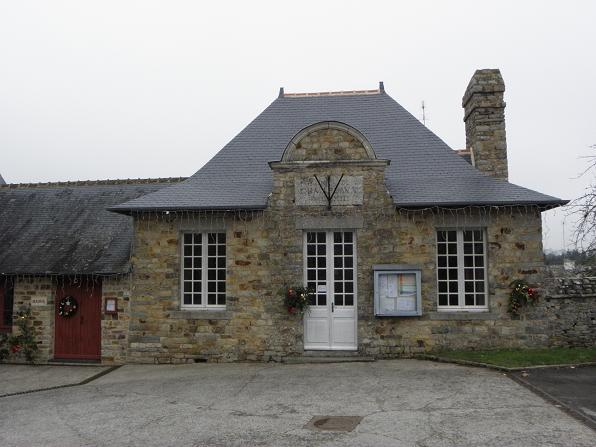
- Town hall

- Coat of arms
- Location of Champeaux
- Location within France Location within Brittany
- Coordinates: 48°08′52″N 1°18′36″W
- Country: France
- Region: Brittany
- Department: Ille-et-Vilaine
- Arrondissement: Fougères-Vitré
- Canton: Vitré
- Intercommunality: CA Vitré Communauté

Government
  - Mayor (2020–2026): Fabienne Belloir
- Area^{1}: 9.83 km^{2} (3.80 sq mi)
- Highest elevation: 116 m (381 ft)
- Lowest elevation: 49 m (161 ft)
- Population (2023): 505
  - Density: 51.4/km^{2} (133/sq mi)
- Time zone: UTC+01:00 (CET)
  - Summer (DST): UTC+02:00 (CEST)
- INSEE/Postal code: 35052 /35500
- ^{1} French Land Register data, which excludes lakes, ponds, glaciers > 1 km^{2} (0.386 sq mi or 247 acres) and river estuaries.

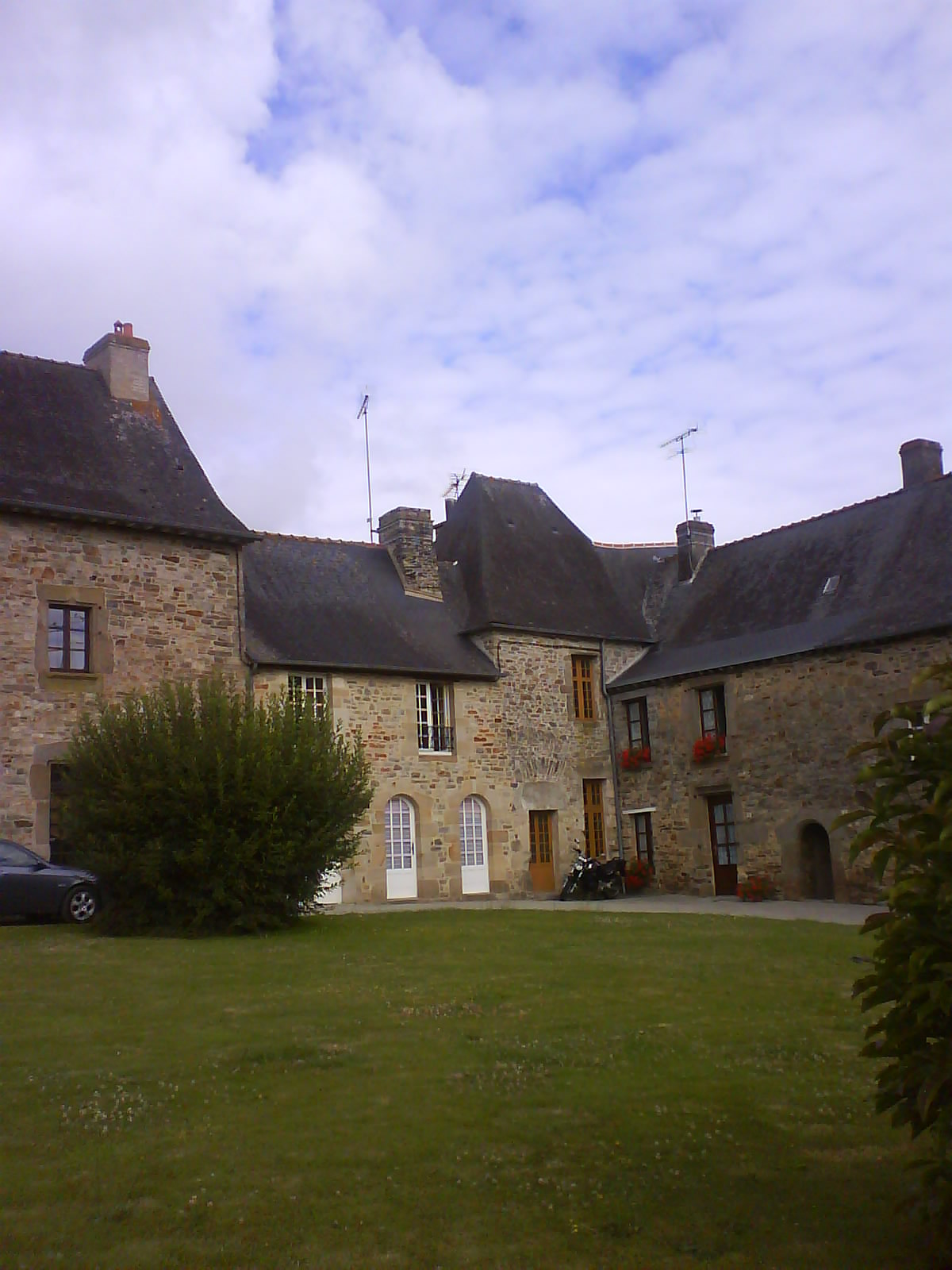
Cloister

Champeaux (French pronunciation: [ʃɑ̃po]; Gallo: Champiao, Breton: Kampal) is a commune in the Ille-et-Vilaine department of Brittany in north-western France.

== Population ==
Inhabitants of Champeaux are called Champéens in French.

Historical population
Year	Pop.	±% p.a.
1968	322	—
1975	311	−0.50%
1982	329	+0.81%
1990	390	+2.15%
1999	420	+0.83%
2007	464	+1.25%
2012	476	+0.51%
2017	504	+1.15%
2023	505	+0.03%
Source: INSEE

== See also ==
- Communes of the Ille-et-Vilaine department
