= Marpiré =

Marpiré Marpirae (Gallo) Marbereg (Breton)
- Commune
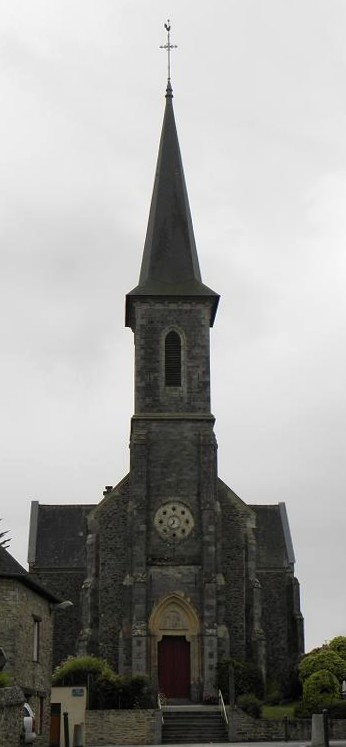
- The parish church of Saint-Pierre
- Location of Marpiré
- Location within France Location within Brittany
- Coordinates: 48°08′37″N 1°20′19″W
- Country: France
- Region: Brittany
- Department: Ille-et-Vilaine
- Arrondissement: Fougères-Vitré
- Canton: Vitré
- Intercommunality: CA Vitré Communauté

Government
  - Mayor (2020–2026): Thérèse Moussu
- Area^{1}: 10.62 km^{2} (4.10 sq mi)
- Highest elevation: 119 m (390 ft)
- Lowest elevation: 69 m (226 ft)
- Population (2023): 1,023
  - Density: 96.33/km^{2} (249.5/sq mi)
- Time zone: UTC+01:00 (CET)
  - Summer (DST): UTC+02:00 (CEST)
- INSEE/Postal code: 35166 /35220
- ^{1} French Land Register data, which excludes lakes, ponds, glaciers > 1 km^{2} (0.386 sq mi or 247 acres) and river estuaries.

Marpiré (French pronunciation: [maʁpiʁe]; Breton: Marbereg; Gallo: Marpirae) is a commune in the Ille-et-Vilaine department in Brittany, northwestern France.

== Population ==
Inhabitants of Marpiré are called Marpiréens in French.

Historical population
Year	Pop.	±% p.a.
1968	397	—
1975	368	−1.08%
1982	417	+1.80%
1990	657	+5.85%
1999	774	+1.84%
2007	998	+3.23%
2012	1,094	+1.85%
2017	1,053	−0.76%
2023	1,023	−0.48%
Source: INSEE

== See also ==
- Communes of the Ille-et-Vilaine department
