= Erbrée =

Erbrée Ervored (Breton)
- Commune
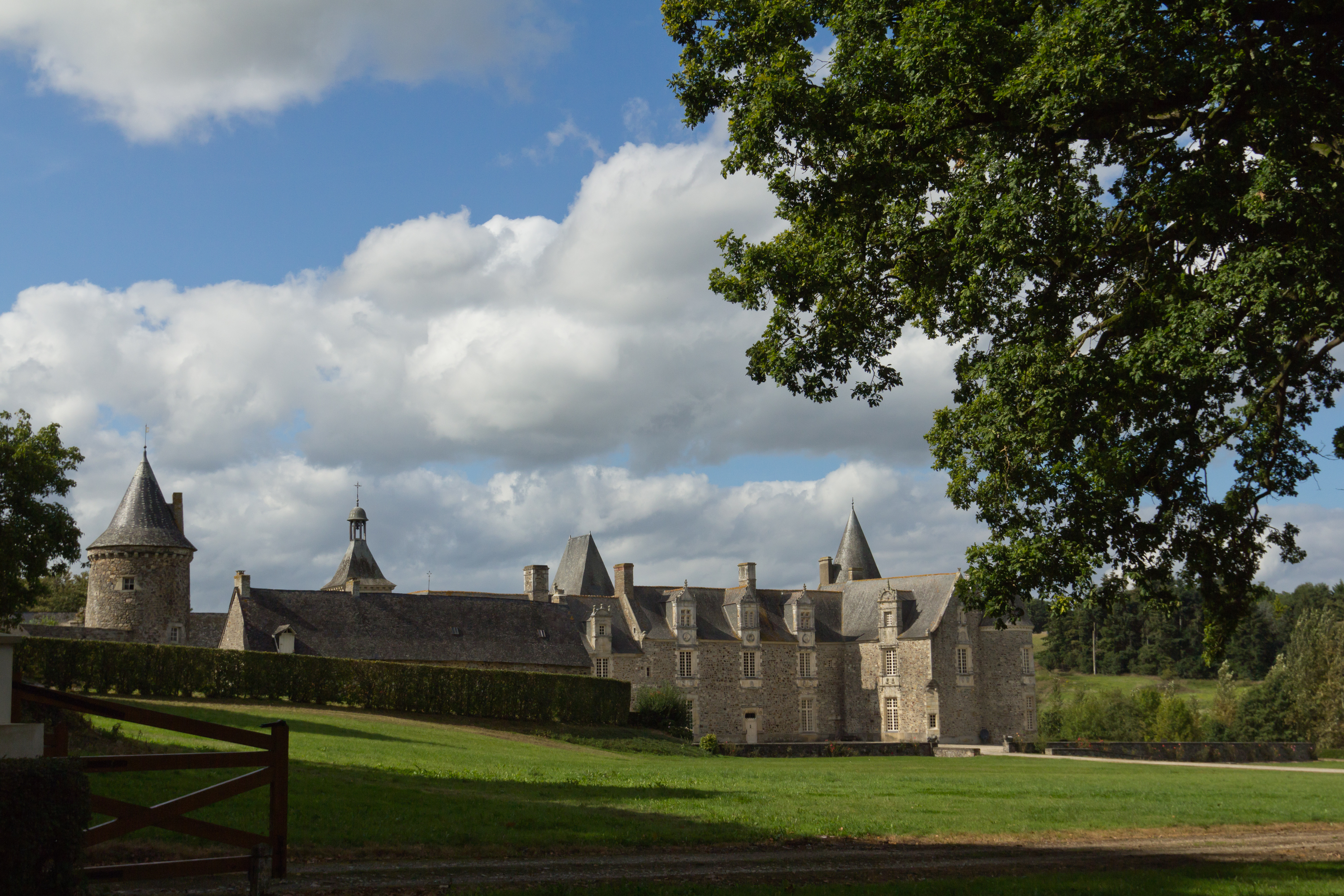
- Château des Nétumières

- Coat of arms
- Location of Erbrée
- Location within France Location within Brittany
- Coordinates: 48°05′59″N 1°07′24″W
- Country: France
- Region: Brittany
- Department: Ille-et-Vilaine
- Arrondissement: Fougères-Vitré
- Canton: Vitré
- Intercommunality: CA Vitré Communauté

Government
  - Mayor (2020–2026): Michel Errard
- Area^{1}: 35.52 km^{2} (13.71 sq mi)
- Highest elevation: 163 m (535 ft)
- Lowest elevation: 70 m (230 ft)
- Population (2023): 1,703
  - Density: 47.94/km^{2} (124.2/sq mi)
- Time zone: UTC+01:00 (CET)
  - Summer (DST): UTC+02:00 (CEST)
- INSEE/Postal code: 35105 /35500
- ^{1} French Land Register data, which excludes lakes, ponds, glaciers > 1 km^{2} (0.386 sq mi or 247 acres) and river estuaries.

Erbrée (French pronunciation: [ɛʁbʁe]; Breton: Ervored) is a commune in the Ille-et-Vilaine department in Brittany in northwestern France.

== Population ==
Inhabitants of Erbrée are called Erbréens in French.

Historical population
Year	Pop.	±% p.a.
1968	1,197	—
1975	1,147	−0.61%
1982	1,323	+2.06%
1990	1,408	+0.78%
1999	1,498	+0.69%
2007	1,672	+1.38%
2012	1,667	−0.06%
2017	1,702	+0.42%
2023	1,703	+0.01%
Source: INSEE

== See also ==
- Communes of the Ille-et-Vilaine department
