= Saint-M'Hervé =

Saint-M'Hervé Sant-Merve (Breton)
- Commune
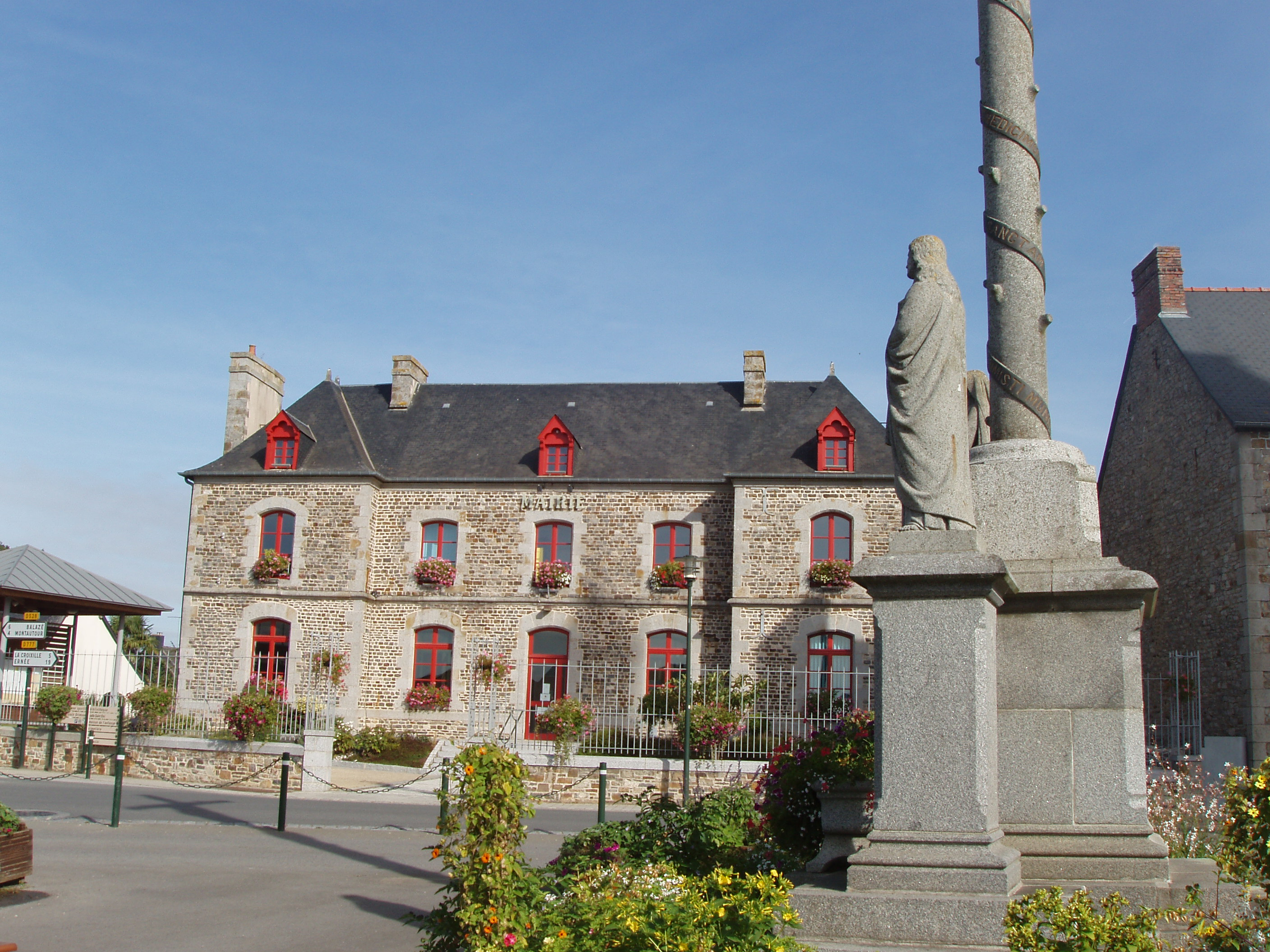
- The town hall of Saint-M'Hervé

- Coat of arms
- Location of Saint-M'Hervé
- Location within France Location within Brittany
- Coordinates: 48°10′46″N 1°06′53″W
- Country: France
- Region: Brittany
- Department: Ille-et-Vilaine
- Arrondissement: Fougères-Vitré
- Canton: Vitré
- Intercommunality: CA Vitré Communauté

Government
  - Mayor (2020–2026): Elisabeth Brun
- Area^{1}: 29.68 km^{2} (11.46 sq mi)
- Highest elevation: 171 m (561 ft)
- Lowest elevation: 72 m (236 ft)
- Population (2023): 1,354
  - Density: 45.62/km^{2} (118.2/sq mi)
- Time zone: UTC+01:00 (CET)
  - Summer (DST): UTC+02:00 (CEST)
- INSEE/Postal code: 35300 /35500
- ^{1} French Land Register data, which excludes lakes, ponds, glaciers > 1 km^{2} (0.386 sq mi or 247 acres) and river estuaries.

Saint-M'Hervé (French pronunciation: [sɛ̃ mɛʁve]; Breton: Sant-Merve) is a commune in the Ille-et-Vilaine department in Brittany in northwestern France.

== Population ==
Inhabitants of Saint-M'Hervé are called saint-m'hervéens in French.

Historical population
| Year | Pop. | ±% p.a. |
|---|---|---|
| 1968 | 1,217 | — |
| 1975 | 1,189 | −0.33% |
| 1982 | 1,193 | +0.05% |
| 1990 | 1,144 | −0.52% |
| 1999 | 1,213 | +0.65% |
| 2007 | 1,343 | +1.28% |
| 2012 | 1,373 | +0.44% |
| 2017 | 1,356 | −0.25% |
| 2023 | 1,354 | −0.02% |
Source: INSEE

== See also ==
- Communes of the Ille-et-Vilaine department
