= Taillis =

Taillis Talieg (Breton)
- Commune
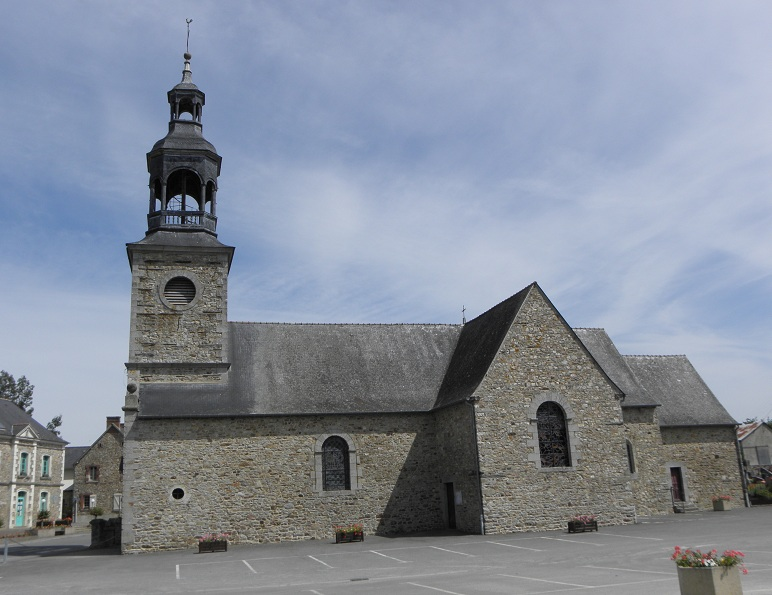
- The church in Taillis
- Location of Taillis
- Location within France Location within Brittany
- Coordinates: 48°11′23″N 1°14′15″W
- Country: France
- Region: Brittany
- Department: Ille-et-Vilaine
- Arrondissement: Fougères-Vitré
- Canton: Vitré
- Intercommunality: CA Vitré Communauté

Government
  - Mayor (2020–2026): Michel Sauvage
- Area^{1}: 12.27 km^{2} (4.74 sq mi)
- Highest elevation: 136 m (446 ft)
- Lowest elevation: 72 m (236 ft)
- Population (2023): 1,028
  - Density: 83.78/km^{2} (217.0/sq mi)
- Time zone: UTC+01:00 (CET)
  - Summer (DST): UTC+02:00 (CEST)
- INSEE/Postal code: 35330 /35500
- ^{1} French Land Register data, which excludes lakes, ponds, glaciers > 1 km^{2} (0.386 sq mi or 247 acres) and river estuaries.

Taillis (Breton: Talieg) is a commune in the Ille-et-Vilaine department in Brittany in northwestern France.

== Population ==
Inhabitants of Taillis are called Taillissiens in French.

Historical population
Year	Pop.	±% p.a.
1968	608	—
1975	627	+0.44%
1982	686	+1.29%
1990	758	+1.26%
1999	768	+0.15%
2007	931	+2.44%
2012	1,032	+2.08%
2017	1,001	−0.61%
2023	1,028	+0.44%
Source: INSEE

== See also ==
- Communes of the Ille-et-Vilaine department
