= Montreuil-des-Landes =

Montreuil-des-Landes Montroelh-dez-Laundd (Gallo) Mousterel-al-Lann (Breton)
- Commune
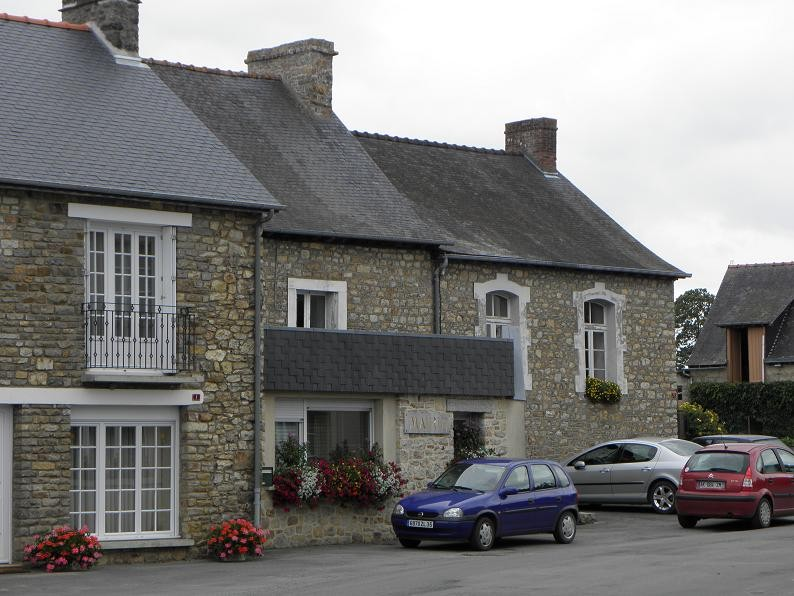
- The town hall of Montreuil-des-Landes
- Location of Montreuil-des-Landes
- Location within France Location within Brittany
- Coordinates: 48°14′51″N 1°13′19″W
- Country: France
- Region: Brittany
- Department: Ille-et-Vilaine
- Arrondissement: Fougères-Vitré
- Canton: Vitré
- Intercommunality: CA Vitré Communauté

Government
  - Mayor (2020–2026): Marie-Louise Berhault
- Area^{1}: 9.42 km^{2} (3.64 sq mi)
- Highest elevation: 133 m (436 ft)
- Lowest elevation: 85 m (279 ft)
- Population (2023): 237
  - Density: 25.2/km^{2} (65.2/sq mi)
- Time zone: UTC+01:00 (CET)
  - Summer (DST): UTC+02:00 (CEST)
- INSEE/Postal code: 35192 /35210
- ^{1} French Land Register data, which excludes lakes, ponds, glaciers > 1 km^{2} (0.386 sq mi or 247 acres) and river estuaries.

Montreuil-des-Landes (French pronunciation: [mɔ̃tʁœj de lɑ̃d]; Breton: Mousterel-al-Lann; Gallo: Montroelh-dez-Laundd) is a commune in the Ille-et-Vilaine department of Brittany in northwestern France.

== Population ==
Inhabitants of Montreuil-des-Landes are called in French montreuillais.

Historical population
Year	Pop.	±% p.a.
1968	255	—
1975	242	−0.74%
1982	234	−0.48%
1990	198	−2.07%
1999	184	−0.81%
2007	214	+1.91%
2012	236	+1.98%
2017	240	+0.34%
2023	237	−0.21%
Source: INSEE

== See also ==
- Communes of the Ille-et-Vilaine department
