= Châtillon-en-Vendelais =

Châtillon-en-Vendelais Balazæ (Gallo) Kastellan-Gwennel (Breton)
- Commune
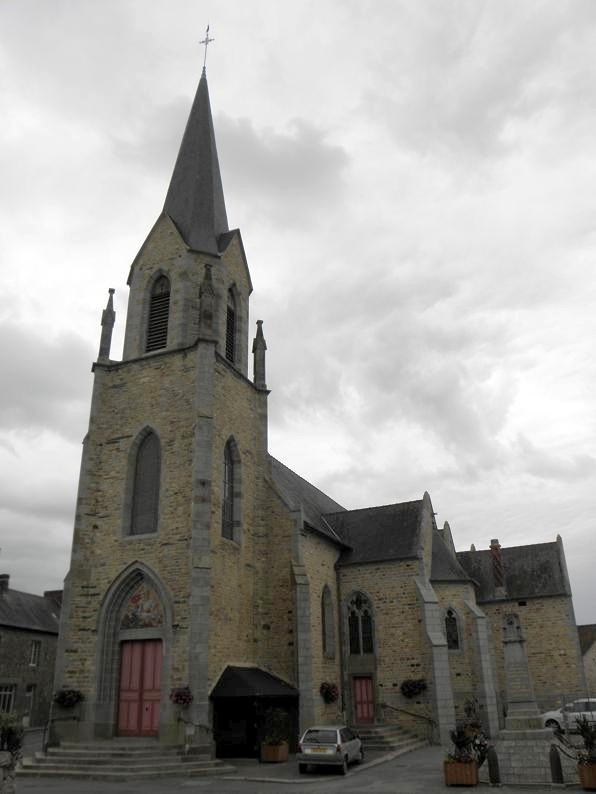
- Saint-Georges Church

- Coat of arms
- Location of Châtillon-en-Vendelais
- Location within France Location within Brittany
- Coordinates: 48°13′33″N 1°10′39″W
- Country: France
- Region: Brittany
- Department: Ille-et-Vilaine
- Arrondissement: Fougères-Vitré
- Canton: Vitré
- Intercommunality: CA Vitré Communauté

Government
  - Mayor (2020–2026): Jean-Luc Duvel
- Area^{1}: 32.03 km^{2} (12.37 sq mi)
- Highest elevation: 194 m (636 ft)
- Lowest elevation: 87 m (285 ft)
- Population (2023): 1,775
  - Density: 55.42/km^{2} (143.5/sq mi)
- Time zone: UTC+01:00 (CET)
  - Summer (DST): UTC+02:00 (CEST)
- INSEE/Postal code: 35072 /35210
- ^{1} French Land Register data, which excludes lakes, ponds, glaciers > 1 km^{2} (0.386 sq mi or 247 acres) and river estuaries.

Châtillon-en-Vendelais (French pronunciation: [ʃatijɔ̃ ɑ̃ vɑ̃dlɛ]; Gallo: Balazæ, Breton: Kastellan-Gwennel) is a commune in the Ille-et-Vilaine department of Brittany in northwestern France.

== Population ==
Inhabitants of Châtillon-en-Vendelais are called Châtillonais in French.

Historical population
Year	Pop.	±% p.a.
1968	1,168	—
1975	1,249	+0.96%
1982	1,394	+1.58%
1990	1,526	+1.14%
1999	1,551	+0.18%
2007	1,663	+0.88%
2012	1,686	+0.28%
2017	1,679	−0.08%
2023	1,775	+0.93%
Source: INSEE

== See also ==
- Communes of the Ille-et-Vilaine department
