= Montreuil-sous-Pérouse =

Montreuil-sous-Pérouse Mousterel-ar-Veineg (Breton)
- Commune
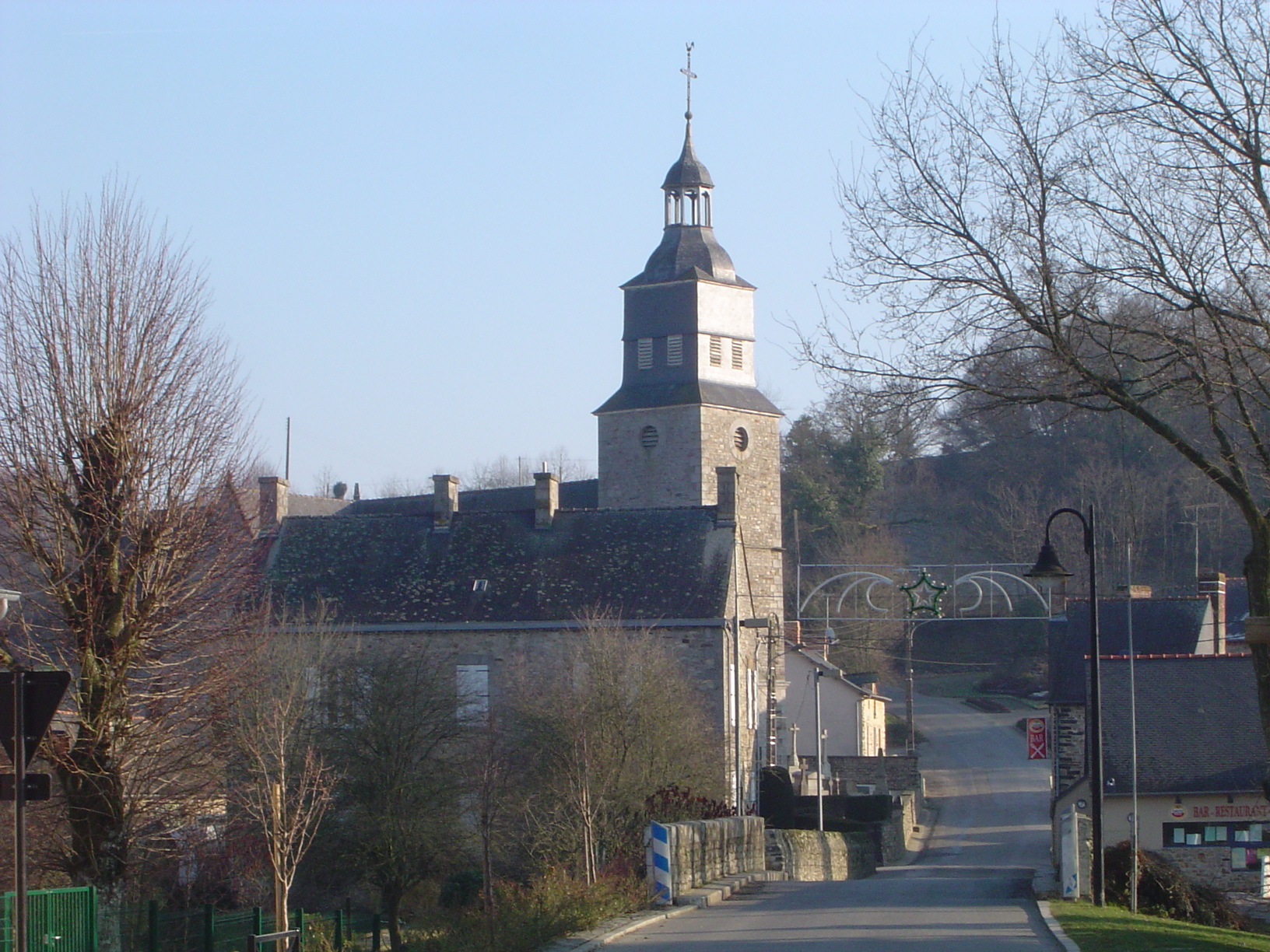
- The church of Saint-Pierre-et-Saint-Paul
- Location of Montreuil-sous-Pérouse
- Location within France Location within Brittany
- Coordinates: 48°09′06″N 1°14′07″W
- Country: France
- Region: Brittany
- Department: Ille-et-Vilaine
- Arrondissement: Fougères-Vitré
- Canton: Vitré
- Intercommunality: CA Vitré Communauté

Government
  - Mayor (2020–2026): Louis Ménager
- Area^{1}: 15.49 km^{2} (5.98 sq mi)
- Highest elevation: 125 m (410 ft)
- Lowest elevation: 53 m (174 ft)
- Population (2023): 1,043
  - Density: 67.33/km^{2} (174.4/sq mi)
- Time zone: UTC+01:00 (CET)
  - Summer (DST): UTC+02:00 (CEST)
- INSEE/Postal code: 35194 /35500
- ^{1} French Land Register data, which excludes lakes, ponds, glaciers > 1 km^{2} (0.386 sq mi or 247 acres) and river estuaries.

Montreuil-sous-Pérouse (French pronunciation: [mɔ̃tʁœj su peʁuz]; Breton: Mousterel-ar-Veineg) is a commune in the Ille-et-Vilaine department in Brittany in northwestern France.

== Population ==
Historical population
Year	Pop.	±% p.a.
1968	509	—
1975	559	+1.35%
1982	798	+5.22%
1990	889	+1.36%
1999	928	+0.48%
2007	1,079	+1.90%
2012	1,041	−0.71%
2017	1,015	−0.50%
2023	1,043	+0.45%
Source: INSEE

Inhabitants of Montreuil-sous-Pérouse are called Montreuillais in French.

== See also ==
- Communes of the Ille-et-Vilaine department
