= Arrondissement of Fougères-Vitré =

Coordinates: 48.35°N 1.20°W

Fougères-Vitré
- Arrondissement
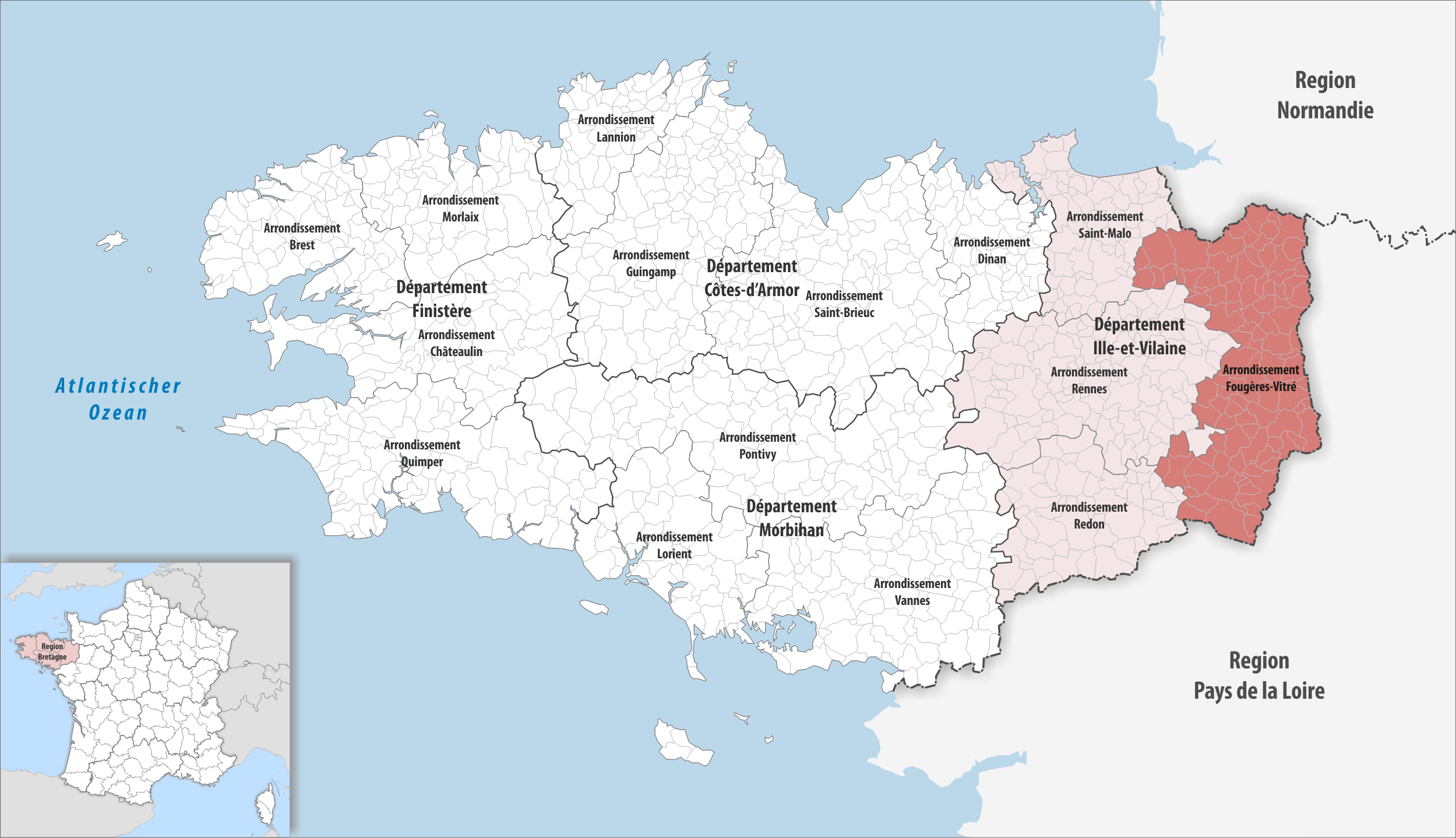
- Location within the region Brittany
- Country: France
- Region: Brittany
- Department: Ille-et-Vilaine
- No. of communes: {{{nbcomm}}}
- Area: 2,173.2 km^{2} (839.1 sq mi)
- Population (2023): 188,992
  - Density: 86.965/km^{2} (225.24/sq mi)
- INSEE code: 351

The arrondissement of Fougères-Vitré (before 2010: arrondissement of Fougères) is an arrondissement of France in the Ille-et-Vilaine department in the Brittany region. It has 105 communes. Its population is 187,711 (2021), and its area is 2,173.2 km^{2} (839.1 sq mi).

== Composition ==
The communes of the arrondissement of Fougères-Vitré, and their INSEE codes, are:

1. Amanlis (35002)
2. Arbrissel (35005)
3. Argentré-du-Plessis (35006)
4. Availles-sur-Seiche (35008)
5. Bais (35014)
6. Balazé (35015)
7. Bazouges-la-Pérouse (35019)
8. La Bazouge-du-Désert (35018)
9. Beaucé (35021)
10. Billé (35025)
11. Boistrudan (35028)
12. Bréal-sous-Vitré (35038)
13. Brie (35041)
14. Brielles (35042)
15. Champeaux (35052)
16. La Chapelle-Erbrée (35061)
17. La Chapelle-Fleurigné (35062)
18. La Chapelle-Saint-Aubert (35063)
19. Châteaubourg (35068)
20. Le Châtellier (35071)
21. Châtillon-en-Vendelais (35072)
22. Chauvigné (35075)
23. Chelun (35077)
24. Coësmes (35082)
25. Combourtillé (35086)
26. Cornillé (35087)
27. Domagné (35096)
28. Domalain (35097)
29. Drouges (35102)
30. Eancé (35103)
31. Erbrée (35105)
32. Essé (35108)
33. Étrelles (35109)
34. Le Ferré (35111)
35. Forges-la-Forêt (35114)
36. Fougères (35115)
37. Gennes-sur-Seiche (35119)
38. La Guerche-de-Bretagne (35125)
39. Janzé (35136)
40. Javené (35137)
41. Laignelet (35138)
42. Landavran (35141)
43. Landéan (35142)
44. Lécousse (35150)
45. Le Loroux (35157)
46. Louvigné-de-Bais (35161)
47. Louvigné-du-Désert (35162)
48. Luitré-Dompierre (35163)
49. Maen Roch (35257)
50. Marcillé-Raoul (35164)
51. Marcillé-Robert (35165)
52. Marpiré (35166)
53. Martigné-Ferchaud (35167)
54. Mecé (35170)
55. Mellé (35174)
56. Mondevert (35183)
57. Montautour (35185)
58. Monthault (35190)
59. Montreuil-des-Landes (35192)
60. Montreuil-sous-Pérouse (35194)
61. Moulins (35198)
62. Moussé (35199)
63. Moutiers (35200)
64. Noyal-sous-Bazouges (35205)
65. Parcé (35214)
66. Parigné (35215)
67. Le Pertre (35217)
68. Pocé-les-Bois (35229)
69. Poilley (35230)
70. Les Portes du Coglais (35191)
71. Rannée (35235)
72. Retiers (35239)
73. Marcillé-Robert (35165)
74. Rimou (35242)
75. Rives-du-Couesnon (35282)
76. Romagné (35243)
77. Romazy (35244)
78. Saint-Aubin-des-Landes (35252)
79. Saint-Christophe-des-Bois (35260)
80. Saint-Christophe-de-Valains (35261)
81. Saint-Didier (35264)
82. Sainte-Colombe (35262)
83. Saint-Georges-de-Reintembault (35271)
84. Saint-Germain-du-Pinel (35272)
85. Saint-Germain-en-Coglès (35273)
86. Saint-Hilaire-des-Landes (35280)
87. Saint-Jean-sur-Vilaine (35283)
88. Saint-Marc-le-Blanc (35292)
89. Saint-M'Hervé (35300)
90. Saint-Ouen-des-Alleux (35304)
91. Saint-Rémy-du-Plain (35309)
92. Saint-Sauveur-des-Landes (35310)
93. La Selle-en-Luitré (35324)
94. La Selle-Guerchaise (35325)
95. Taillis (35330)
96. Le Theil-de-Bretagne (35333)
97. Thourie (35335)
98. Le Tiercent (35336)
99. Torcé (35338)
100. Val-Couesnon (35004)
101. Val-d'Izé (35347)
102. Vergéal (35347)
103. Villamée (35357)
104. Visseiche (35359)
105. Vitré (35360)

== History ==
The arrondissement of Fougères was created in 1800. In 2010 its name was changed to arrondissement of Fougères-Vitré, and it absorbed the six cantons of Argentré-du-Plessis, Châteaubourg, La Guerche-de-Bretagne, Retiers, Vitré-Est and Vitré-Ouest from the arrondissement of Rennes. At the January 2017 reorganisation of the arrondissements of Ille-et-Vilaine, it gained five communes from the arrondissement of Rennes, and it lost four communes to the arrondissement of Rennes.

As a result of the reorganisation of the cantons of France which came into effect in 2015, the borders of the cantons are no longer related to the borders of the arrondissements. The cantons of the arrondissement of Fougères-Vitré were, as of January 2015:

1. Antrain
2. Argentré-du-Plessis
3. Châteaubourg
4. Fougères-Nord
5. Fougères-Sud
6. La Guerche-de-Bretagne
7. Louvigné-du-Désert
8. Retiers
9. Saint-Aubin-du-Cormier
10. Saint-Brice-en-Coglès
11. Vitré-Est
12. Vitré-Ouest
