= Étrelles =

Étrelles Estrèll (Gallo) Stredell (Breton)
- Commune
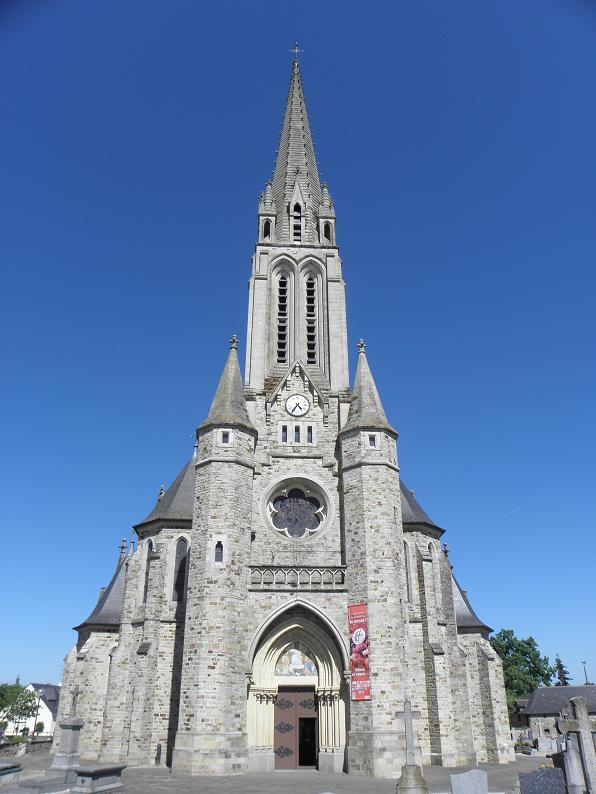
- Saint Pierre and Saint Paul church

- Coat of arms
- Location of Étrelles
- Location within France Location within Brittany
- Coordinates: 48°03′39″N 1°11′33″W
- Country: France
- Region: Brittany
- Department: Ille-et-Vilaine
- Arrondissement: Fougères-Vitré
- Canton: La Guerche-de-Bretagne
- Intercommunality: CA Vitré Communauté

Government
  - Mayor (2020–2026): Marie-Christine Morice
- Area^{1}: 27.17 km^{2} (10.49 sq mi)
- Highest elevation: 108 m (354 ft)
- Lowest elevation: 52 m (171 ft)
- Population (2023): 2,703
  - Density: 99.48/km^{2} (257.7/sq mi)
- Time zone: UTC+01:00 (CET)
  - Summer (DST): UTC+02:00 (CEST)
- INSEE/Postal code: 35109 /35370
- ^{1} French Land Register data, which excludes lakes, ponds, glaciers > 1 km^{2} (0.386 sq mi or 247 acres) and river estuaries.

Étrelles (French pronunciation: [etʁɛl]; Breton: Stredell; Gallo: Estrèll) is a commune in the Ille-et-Vilaine department in Brittany in northwestern France.

== Population ==
Inhabitants of Étrelles are called Étrellais in French.

Historical population
Year	Pop.	±% p.a.
1968	1,251	—
1975	1,327	+0.85%
1982	1,486	+1.63%
1990	1,809	+2.49%
1999	2,130	+1.83%
2007	2,491	+1.98%
2012	2,580	+0.70%
2017	2,543	−0.29%
2023	2,703	+1.02%
Source: INSEE

== See also ==
- Communes of the Ille-et-Vilaine department
