= Vergéal =

Vergéal Verjau (Gallo) Gwerial (Breton)
- Commune
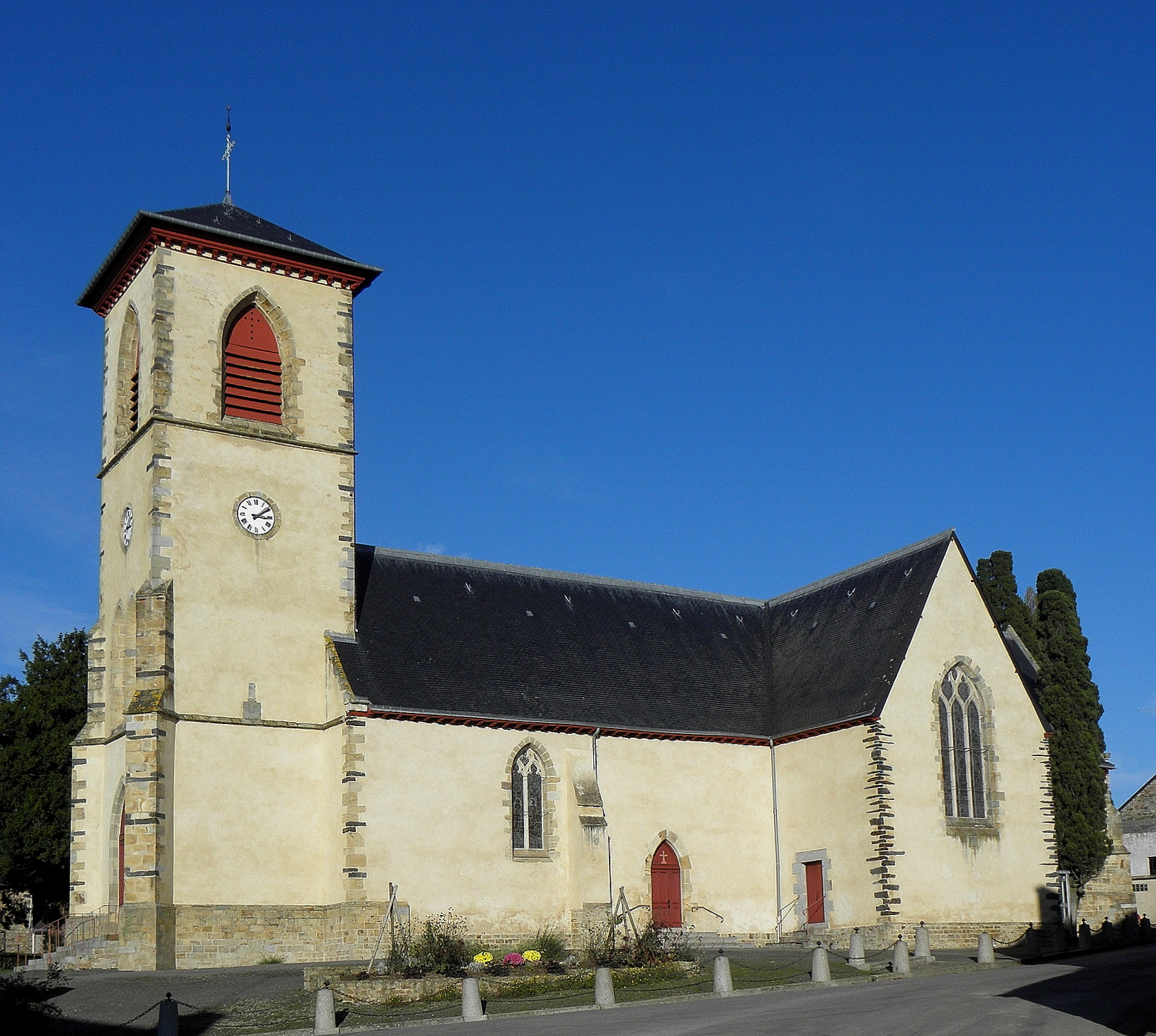
- The church in Vergéal
- Location of Vergéal
- Location within France Location within Brittany
- Coordinates: 48°02′12″N 1°15′53″W
- Country: France
- Region: Brittany
- Department: Ille-et-Vilaine
- Arrondissement: Fougères-Vitré
- Canton: La Guerche-de-Bretagne
- Intercommunality: CA Vitré Communauté

Government
  - Mayor (2020–2026): Samuel Urien
- Area^{1}: 11.21 km^{2} (4.33 sq mi)
- Highest elevation: 108 m (354 ft)
- Lowest elevation: 62 m (203 ft)
- Population (2023): 806
  - Density: 71.9/km^{2} (186/sq mi)
- Time zone: UTC+01:00 (CET)
  - Summer (DST): UTC+02:00 (CEST)
- INSEE/Postal code: 35350 /35680
- ^{1} French Land Register data, which excludes lakes, ponds, glaciers > 1 km^{2} (0.386 sq mi or 247 acres) and river estuaries.

Vergéal (French pronunciation: [vɛʁʒeal]; Breton: Gwerial; Gallo: Verjau) is a commune in the Ille-et-Vilaine department in Brittany in northwestern France.

== Population ==
Inhabitants of Vergéal are called Vergéalais in French.

Historical population
Year	Pop.	±% p.a.
1968	515	—
1975	470	−1.30%
1982	464	−0.18%
1990	535	+1.80%
1999	590	+1.09%
2007	703	+2.21%
2012	765	+1.70%
2017	804	+1.00%
2023	806	+0.04%
Source: INSEE

== See also ==
- Communes of the Ille-et-Vilaine department
