= Domalain =

Domalain Domalaen (Gallo) Domalan (Breton)
- Commune
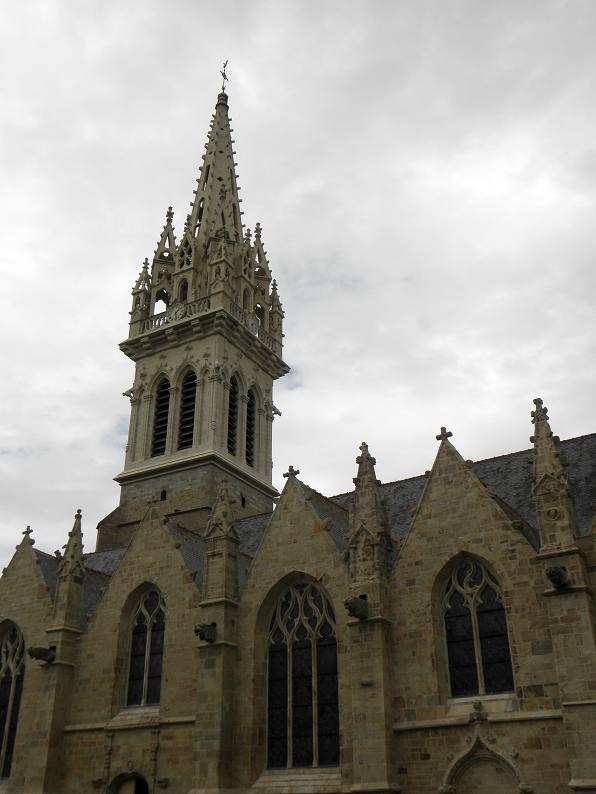
- Saint Melaine church
- Location of Domalain
- Location within France Location within Brittany
- Coordinates: 47°59′49″N 1°14′25″W
- Country: France
- Region: Brittany
- Department: Ille-et-Vilaine
- Arrondissement: Fougères-Vitré
- Canton: La Guerche-de-Bretagne
- Intercommunality: CA Vitré Communauté

Government
  - Mayor (2020–2026): Christian Olivier
- Area^{1}: 33.54 km^{2} (12.95 sq mi)
- Highest elevation: 108 m (354 ft)
- Lowest elevation: 45 m (148 ft)
- Population (2023): 2,055
  - Density: 61.27/km^{2} (158.7/sq mi)
- Time zone: UTC+01:00 (CET)
  - Summer (DST): UTC+02:00 (CEST)
- INSEE/Postal code: 35097 /35680
- ^{1} French Land Register data, which excludes lakes, ponds, glaciers > 1 km^{2} (0.386 sq mi or 247 acres) and river estuaries.

Domalain (French pronunciation: [dɔmalɛ̃]; Breton: Domalan; Gallo: Domalaen) is a commune in the Ille-et-Vilaine department of Brittany in northwestern France.

== Population ==
Inhabitants of Domalain are called Domalinois in French.

Historical population
Year	Pop.	±% p.a.
1968	1,534	—
1975	1,506	−0.26%
1982	1,404	−1.00%
1990	1,382	−0.20%
1999	1,490	+0.84%
2007	1,870	+2.88%
2012	1,953	+0.87%
2017	2,018	+0.66%
2023	2,055	+0.30%
Source: INSEE

== See also ==
- Communes of the Ille-et-Vilaine department
