= Brielles =

Brielles Berièll (Gallo) Brielloù (Breton)
- Commune
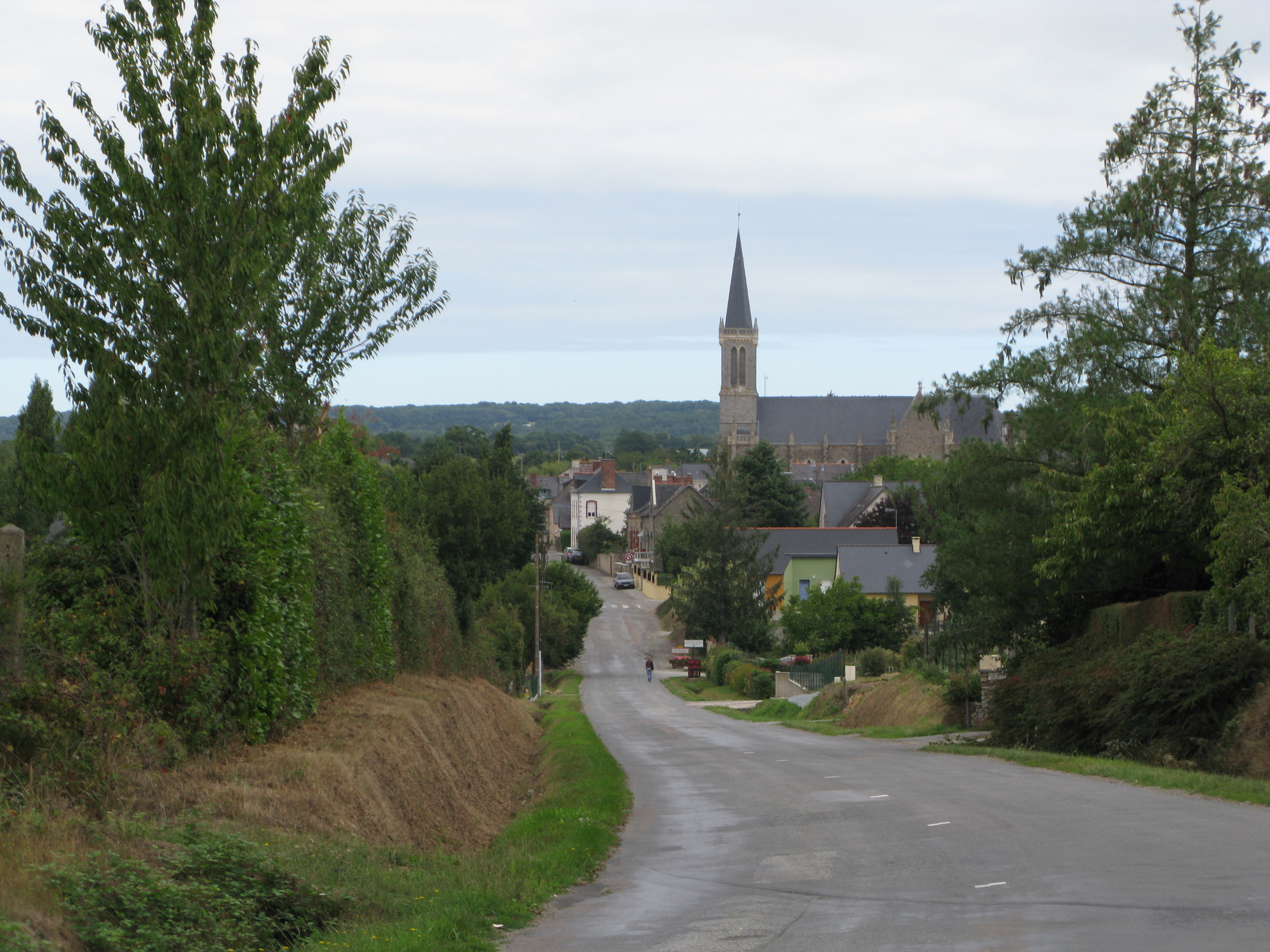
- A general view of Brielles

- Coat of arms
- Location of Brielles
- Location within France Location within Brittany
- Coordinates: 48°00′34″N 1°05′21″W
- Country: France
- Region: Brittany
- Department: Ille-et-Vilaine
- Arrondissement: Fougères-Vitré
- Canton: La Guerche-de-Bretagne
- Intercommunality: Vitré Communauté

Government
  - Mayor (2020–2026): Élisabeth Delahaye
- Area^{1}: 11.40 km^{2} (4.40 sq mi)
- Highest elevation: 109 m (358 ft)
- Lowest elevation: 67 m (220 ft)
- Population (2023): 692
  - Density: 60.7/km^{2} (157/sq mi)
- Time zone: UTC+01:00 (CET)
  - Summer (DST): UTC+02:00 (CEST)
- INSEE/Postal code: 35042 /35370
- ^{1} French Land Register data, which excludes lakes, ponds, glaciers > 1 km^{2} (0.386 sq mi or 247 acres) and river estuaries.

Brielles (French pronunciation: [bʁijɛl]; Breton: Brielloù; Gallo: Berièll) is a commune in the Ille-et-Vilaine department in Brittany in northwestern France.

== Population ==
Inhabitants of Brielles are called Briellois in French.

Historical population
Year	Pop.	±% p.a.
1968	582	—
1975	520	−1.60%
1982	501	−0.53%
1990	484	−0.43%
1999	513	+0.65%
2007	644	+2.88%
2012	693	+1.48%
2017	687	−0.17%
2023	692	+0.12%
Source: INSEE

== See also ==
- Communes of the Ille-et-Vilaine department
