= Le Pertre =

Le Pertre Le Pèrtr (Gallo) Ar Perzh (Breton)
- Commune
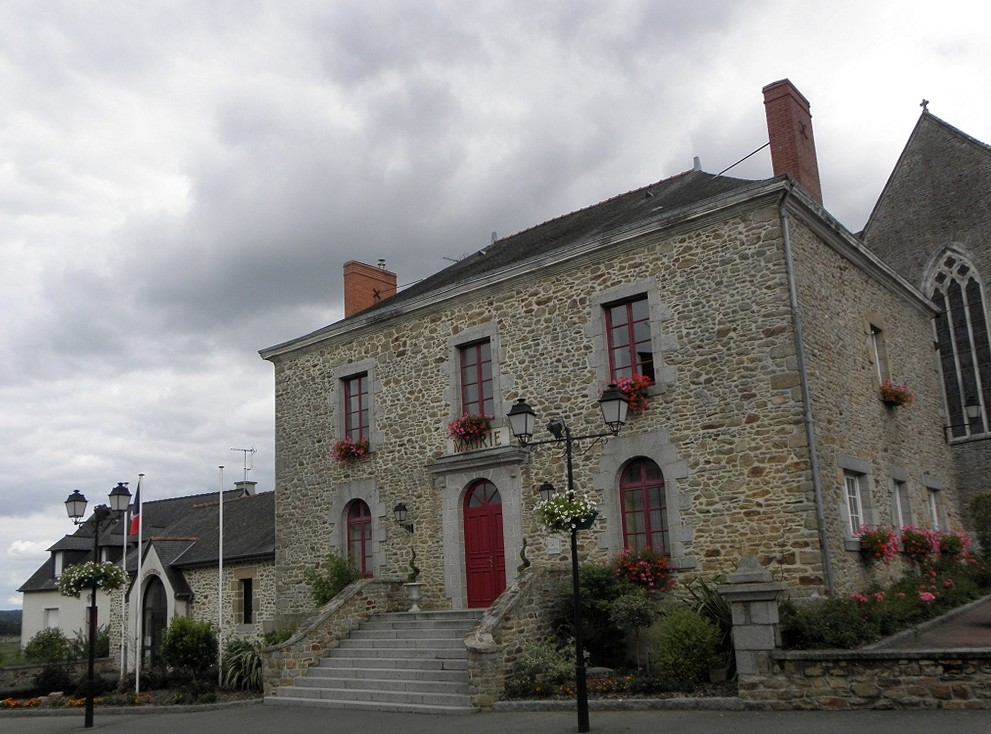
- The town hall of Le Pertre

- Coat of arms
- Location of Le Pertre
- Location within France Location within Brittany
- Coordinates: 48°02′08″N 1°02′09″W
- Country: France
- Region: Brittany
- Department: Ille-et-Vilaine
- Arrondissement: Fougères-Vitré
- Canton: La Guerche-de-Bretagne
- Intercommunality: CA Vitré Communauté

Government
  - Mayor (2024–2026): Aurélien Thébert
- Area^{1}: 43.63 km^{2} (16.85 sq mi)
- Highest elevation: 184 m (604 ft)
- Lowest elevation: 67 m (220 ft)
- Population (2023): 1,363
  - Density: 31.24/km^{2} (80.91/sq mi)
- Time zone: UTC+01:00 (CET)
  - Summer (DST): UTC+02:00 (CEST)
- INSEE/Postal code: 35217 /35370
- ^{1} French Land Register data, which excludes lakes, ponds, glaciers > 1 km^{2} (0.386 sq mi or 247 acres) and river estuaries.

Le Pertre (French pronunciation: [lə pɛʁtʁ]；Gallo: Le Pèrt, Breton: Ar Perzh) is a commune in the Ille-et-Vilaine department of Brittany in northwestern France.

== Heritage ==
The church of Saint-Martin-de-Vertou is located in the centre of the village. The steeple of the church was originally constructed to a height of 83 metres in 1920. However, due to repairs, especially after the fall of the steeple of 1982, the height may have changed. It is possible to access a parapet located at 37 metres from the ground. Legend has it that thirty-nine bell towers are visible in good weather from the top of the church.

Le Pertre forest has an area of 1,513 hectares. It is an oak grove which was classified, in 1997, as a natural area of ecological interest, faunistic and floristic. It has some ornithological interest since thirty-two species of birds are listed there, five of which are uncommon in the region (Honey Buzzard, Common Hawk, Hoopoe, Redstart, and Woodpecker). In addition, this forest has two species of bats.

== Population ==
Historical population
Year	Pop.	±% p.a.
1968	1,376	—
1975	1,270	−1.14%
1982	1,335	+0.72%
1990	1,326	−0.08%
1999	1,361	+0.29%
2007	1,393	+0.29%
2012	1,424	+0.44%
2017	1,389	−0.50%
2023	1,363	−0.31%
Source: INSEE

Inhabitants of Le Pertre are called in French pertrais.

== See also ==
- Communes of the Ille-et-Vilaine department
