= Chelun =

Chelun Chelun (Gallo) Kelon (Breton)
- Commune
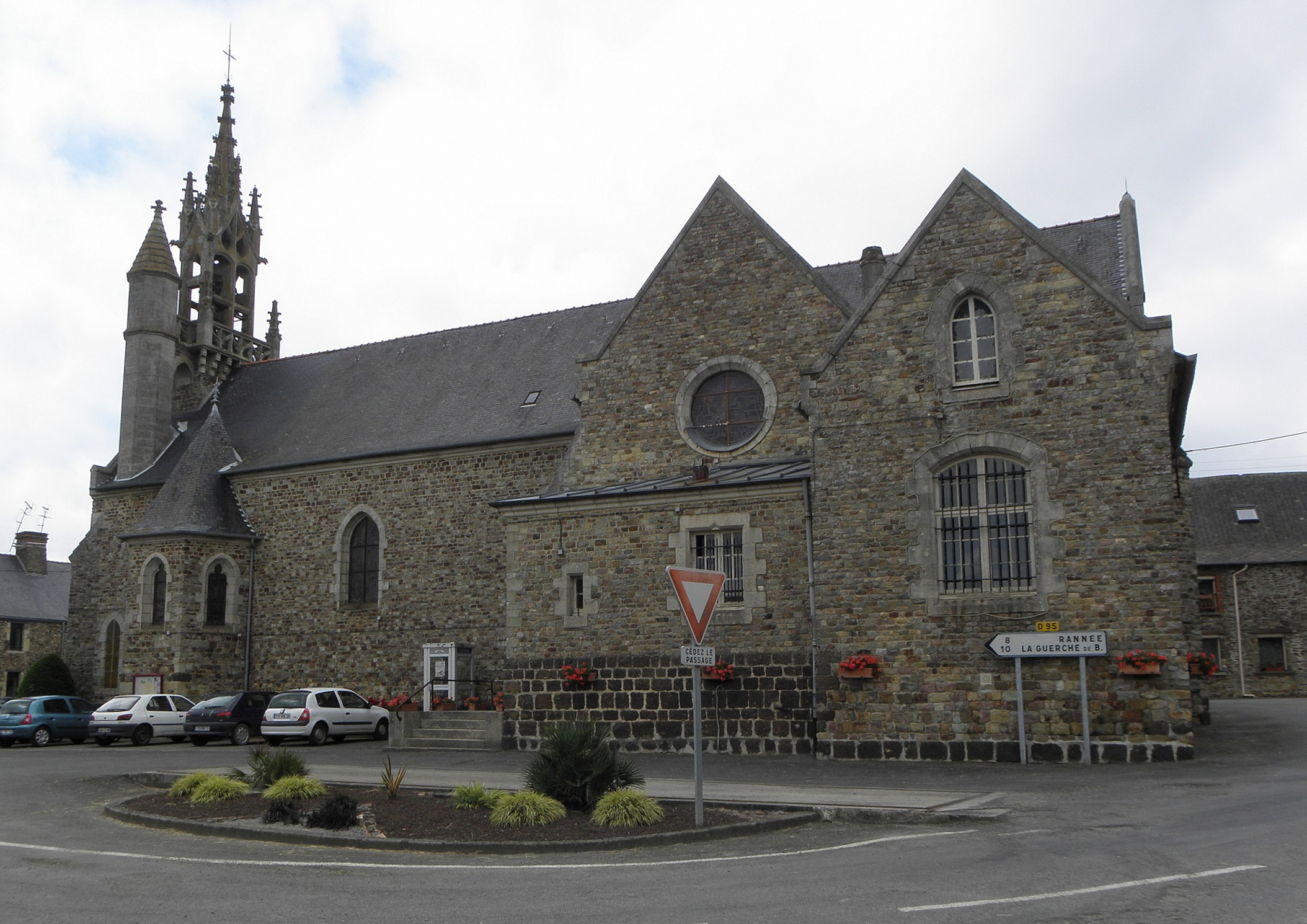
- The parish church of Saint-Pierre
- Location of Chelun
- Location within France Location within Brittany
- Coordinates: 47°51′20″N 1°13′23″W
- Country: France
- Region: Brittany
- Department: Ille-et-Vilaine
- Arrondissement: Fougères-Vitré
- Canton: La Guerche-de-Bretagne
- Intercommunality: Roche-aux-Fées

Government
  - Mayor (2020–2026): Christian Sorieux
- Area^{1}: 11.25 km^{2} (4.34 sq mi)
- Highest elevation: 112 m (367 ft)
- Lowest elevation: 73 m (240 ft)
- Population (2023): 363
  - Density: 32.3/km^{2} (83.6/sq mi)
- Time zone: UTC+01:00 (CET)
  - Summer (DST): UTC+02:00 (CEST)
- INSEE/Postal code: 35077 /35640
- ^{1} French Land Register data, which excludes lakes, ponds, glaciers > 1 km^{2} (0.386 sq mi or 247 acres) and river estuaries.

Chelun (French pronunciation: [ʃəlœ̃]; Breton: Kelon, Gallo: Chelun) is a commune in the Ille-et-Vilaine department of Brittany in northwestern France.

== Population ==
Inhabitants of Chelun are called Chelunais in French.

Historical population
Year	Pop.	±% p.a.
1968	428	—
1975	360	−2.44%
1982	306	−2.29%
1990	270	−1.55%
1999	252	−0.76%
2007	314	+2.79%
2012	344	+1.84%
2017	349	+0.29%
2023	363	+0.66%
Source: INSEE

== See also ==
- Communes of the Ille-et-Vilaine department
