= Gennes-sur-Seiche =

Gennes-sur-Seiche Genn (Gallo) Gen (Breton)
- Commune
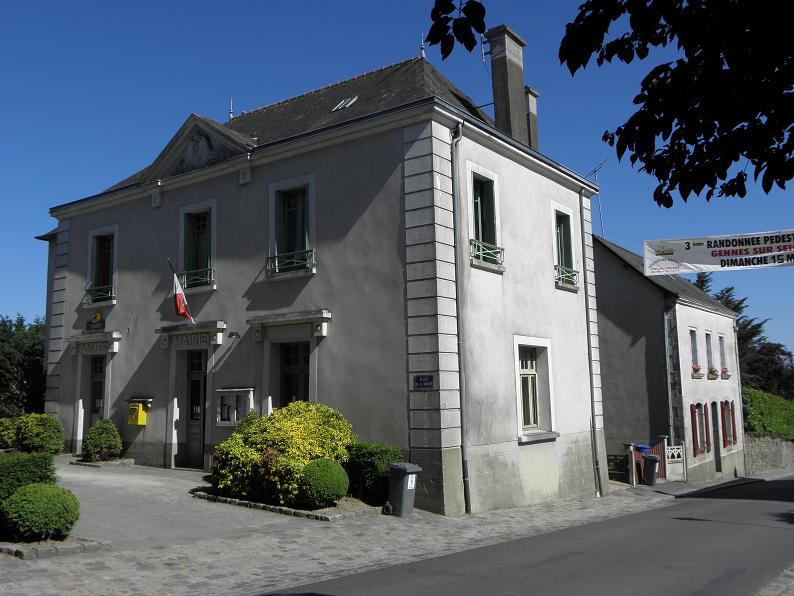
- Town hall

- Coat of arms
- Location of Gennes-sur-Seiche
- Location within France Location within Brittany
- Coordinates: 47°59′21″N 1°07′21″W
- Country: France
- Region: Brittany
- Department: Ille-et-Vilaine
- Arrondissement: Fougères-Vitré
- Canton: La Guerche-de-Bretagne
- Intercommunality: CA Vitré Communauté

Government
  - Mayor (2020–2026): Henri Beguin
- Area^{1}: 18.50 km^{2} (7.14 sq mi)
- Highest elevation: 104 m (341 ft)
- Lowest elevation: 58 m (190 ft)
- Population (2023): 938
  - Density: 50.7/km^{2} (131/sq mi)
- Time zone: UTC+01:00 (CET)
  - Summer (DST): UTC+02:00 (CEST)
- INSEE/Postal code: 35119 /35370
- ^{1} French Land Register data, which excludes lakes, ponds, glaciers > 1 km^{2} (0.386 sq mi or 247 acres) and river estuaries.

Gennes-sur-Seiche (French pronunciation: [ʒɛn syʁ sɛʃ]; Breton: Gen; Gallo: Genn) is a commune in the Ille-et-Vilaine department in Brittany in northwestern France.

== Population ==
Inhabitants of Gennes-sur-Seiche are called Gennois in French.

Historical population
Year	Pop.	±% p.a.
1968	887	—
1975	789	−1.66%
1982	758	−0.57%
1990	742	−0.27%
1999	740	−0.03%
2007	785	+0.74%
2012	845	+1.48%
2017	950	+2.37%
2023	938	−0.21%
Source: INSEE

== See also ==
- Communes of the Ille-et-Vilaine department
