= Sainte-Colombe, Ille-et-Vilaine =

Sainte-Colombe Saentt-Cólonbb-an-la-Méy (Gallo) Santez-Koulm (Breton)
- Commune
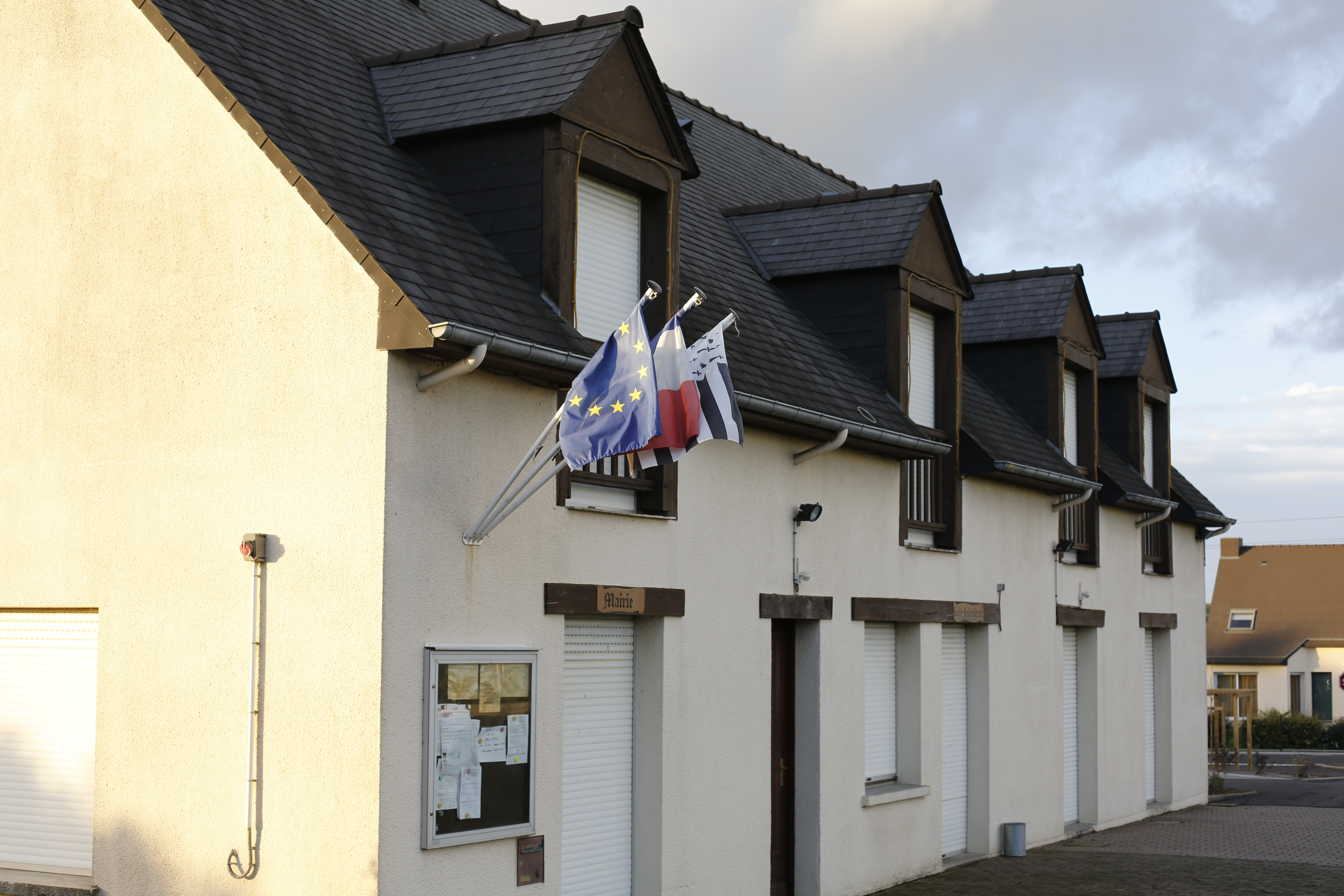
- The town hall of Sainte-Colombe
- Location of Sainte-Colombe
- Location within France Location within Brittany
- Coordinates: 47°53′19″N 1°27′18″W
- Country: France
- Region: Brittany
- Department: Ille-et-Vilaine
- Arrondissement: Fougères-Vitré
- Canton: La Guerche-de-Bretagne
- Intercommunality: Roche-aux-Fées

Government
  - Mayor (2022–2026): Julien Richard
- Area^{1}: 7.58 km^{2} (2.93 sq mi)
- Highest elevation: 106 m (348 ft)
- Lowest elevation: 47 m (154 ft)
- Population (2023): 368
  - Density: 48.5/km^{2} (126/sq mi)
- Time zone: UTC+01:00 (CET)
  - Summer (DST): UTC+02:00 (CEST)
- INSEE/Postal code: 35262 /35134
- ^{1} French Land Register data, which excludes lakes, ponds, glaciers > 1 km^{2} (0.386 sq mi or 247 acres) and river estuaries.

Sainte-Colombe (French pronunciation: [sɛ̃t kɔlɔ̃b]; Gallo: Saentt-Cólonbb-an-la-Méy, Breton: Santez-Koulm) is a commune in the Ille-et-Vilaine department in Brittany in northwestern France.

== Population ==
Inhabitants of Sainte-Colombe are called colombins in French.

Historical population
Year	Pop.	±% p.a.
1968	296	—
1975	277	−0.94%
1982	276	−0.05%
1990	262	−0.65%
1999	272	+0.42%
2007	304	+1.40%
2012	311	+0.46%
2017	351	+2.45%
2023	368	+0.79%
Source: INSEE

== See also ==
- Communes of the Ille-et-Vilaine department
