= Bais, Ille-et-Vilaine =

Bais Baès (Gallo) Baez (Breton)
- Commune
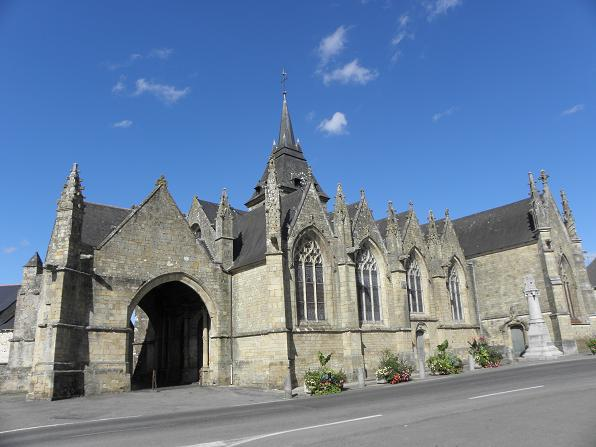
- Saint Mars church

- Coat of arms
- Location of Bais
- Location within France Location within Brittany
- Coordinates: 48°00′41″N 1°17′21″W
- Country: France
- Region: Brittany
- Department: Ille-et-Vilaine
- Arrondissement: Fougères-Vitré
- Canton: La Guerche-de-Bretagne
- Intercommunality: CA Vitré Communauté

Government
  - Mayor (2020–2026): Nathalie Clouet
- Area^{1}: 35.18 km^{2} (13.58 sq mi)
- Highest elevation: 109 m (358 ft)
- Lowest elevation: 47 m (154 ft)
- Population (2023): 2,539
  - Density: 72.17/km^{2} (186.9/sq mi)
- Time zone: UTC+01:00 (CET)
  - Summer (DST): UTC+02:00 (CEST)
- INSEE/Postal code: 35014 /35680
- ^{1} French Land Register data, which excludes lakes, ponds, glaciers > 1 km^{2} (0.386 sq mi or 247 acres) and river estuaries.

Bais (French pronunciation: [bɛ]; Breton: Baez; Gallo: Baès) is a commune in the Ille-et-Vilaine department in Brittany in northwestern France. The writer Anne de Tourville (1910–2004), winner of the 1951 Prix Femina, was born in Bais.

== Population ==
Historical population
Year	Pop.	±% p.a.
1968	2,095	—
1975	2,022	−0.51%
1982	1,913	−0.79%
1990	1,821	−0.61%
1999	1,928	+0.64%
2007	2,020	+0.58%
2012	2,152	+1.27%
2017	2,419	+2.37%
2023	2,539	+0.81%
Source: INSEE

Inhabitants of Bais are called Baiséens in French.

== Sights ==
Gallo-Roman remains have been discovered that date from the first century AD.

The church of Saint Mars was built primarily in the 16th century, with expansion in the 19th century. It is dedicated to Saint Mars, bishop of Nantes in the sixth century, who became a hermit in the neighboring village of Marsé.

== See also ==
- Communes of the Ille-et-Vilaine department
