= Anne de Tourville =

French writer (1910–2004)

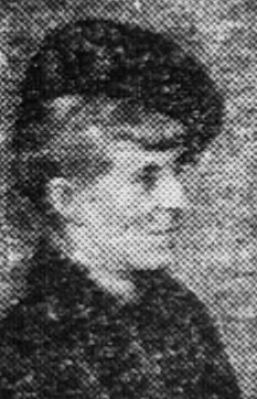
De Tourville in 1943

Anne Marie Nouel de Tourville de Buzonnière (French pronunciation: [an də tuʁvil]; 26 August 1910 – September 2004) was a French novelist, whose works are strongly associated with Brittany and its maritime culture. She gained national recognition when she won the Prix Femina in 1951 for her novel Jabadao, a lyrical evocation of Breton traditions and landscapes.

Although not a prolific author, de Tourville published several novels and collections that depicted the life of coastal communities and the role of women in maritime society. Her writing, often described as poetic and rooted in place, reflects the broader movement of 20th-century French regionalist literature.

== Biography ==
The daughter of Jean de Tourville and his wife Marie née Lesage de la Haye, she was born in the village of Bais, Ille-et-Vilaine, and spent her childhood in Morieux, then at Saint-Servan. Around 1966, she settled in Dinard, which she did not leave until the late 1990s to return to her native village. She lived there peacefully until her death in September 2004 in Vitré in the home of the children of friends who had helped her and her family during the Second World War.

Her novels, with rural settings such as "Jabadao", which earned her the Prix Femina, or maritime settings such as "Matelot Gaël", are set in a Brittany half real and half imagined.

Writing was not her only talent: she exhibited her miniature paintings at the Salon des artistes français.

== Works ==
- 1944: Les gens de par ici, Prix interallié de Bretagne
- 1951: Jabadao, éditions Delamain et Boutelleau, Prix Femina
- 1953: Matelot Gaël
- 1958: Femmes de la mer

== Bibliography ==
- Anne de Tourville, ou le magique sillage de son rêve, Le Pays de Dinan. Patrick Delon. Tome XIV. Bibliothèque municipale. Dinan. 1994.
- La Mort en Bretagne chez Pierre Loti et Anne de Tourville, Mémoires de la Société d'émulation des Côtes-d'Armor CXXIX, 2000, pp. 123–135.
- "Jabadao" d'Anne de Tourville: la genèse d'un roman authentiquement breton, Revue française n°12, December 2001, pp. 55–68.
