= Arbrissel =

Arbrissel Arbeczèu (Gallo) Ervrezhell (Breton)
- Commune
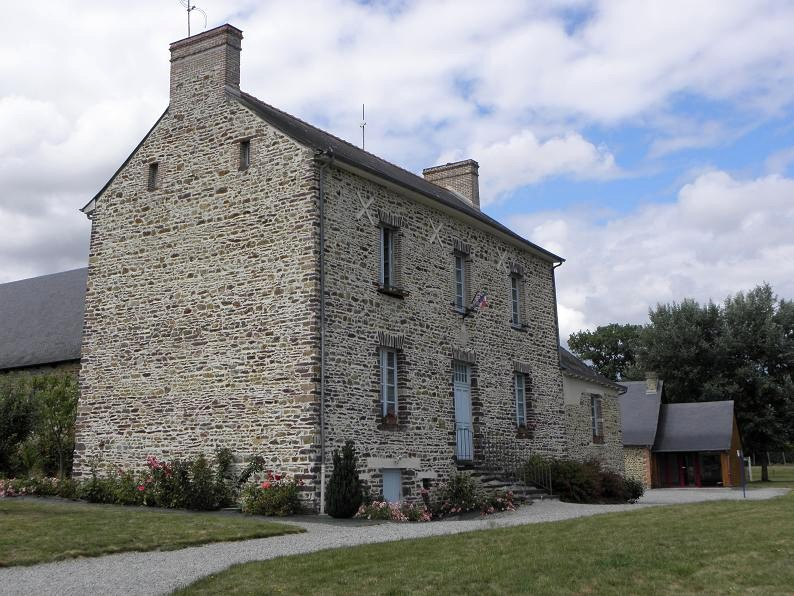
- Town hall
- Location of Arbrissel
- Location within France Location within Brittany
- Coordinates: 47°55′39″N 1°18′11″W
- Country: France
- Region: Brittany
- Department: Ille-et-Vilaine
- Arrondissement: Fougères-Vitré
- Canton: La Guerche-de-Bretagne
- Intercommunality: Roche-aux-Fées

Government
  - Mayor (2020–2026): Thomas Bardy
- Area^{1}: 4.62 km^{2} (1.78 sq mi)
- Highest elevation: 82 m (269 ft)
- Lowest elevation: 52 m (171 ft)
- Population (2023): 266
  - Density: 57.6/km^{2} (149/sq mi)
- Time zone: UTC+01:00 (CET)
  - Summer (DST): UTC+02:00 (CEST)
- INSEE/Postal code: 35005 /35130
- ^{1} French Land Register data, which excludes lakes, ponds, glaciers > 1 km^{2} (0.386 sq mi or 247 acres) and river estuaries.

Arbrissel (French pronunciation: [aʁbʁisɛl]; Breton: Ervrezhell; Gallo: Arbeczèu) is a commune in the Ille-et-Vilaine department in Brittany in northwestern France.

== Population ==
Historical population
Year	Pop.	±% p.a.
1968	219	—
1975	234	+0.95%
1982	232	−0.12%
1990	223	−0.49%
1999	237	+0.68%
2007	256	+0.97%
2012	291	+2.60%
2017	306	+1.01%
2023	266	−2.31%
Source: INSEE

Inhabitants of Arbrissel are called Arbrisselois in French.

== Personalities ==
Robert of Arbrissel, the founder of the Abbey of Fontevrault, was born in Arbrissel.

== See also ==
- Communes of the Ille-et-Vilaine department
