= Visseiche =

Visseiche Visèch (Gallo) Gwisec'h (Breton)
- Commune
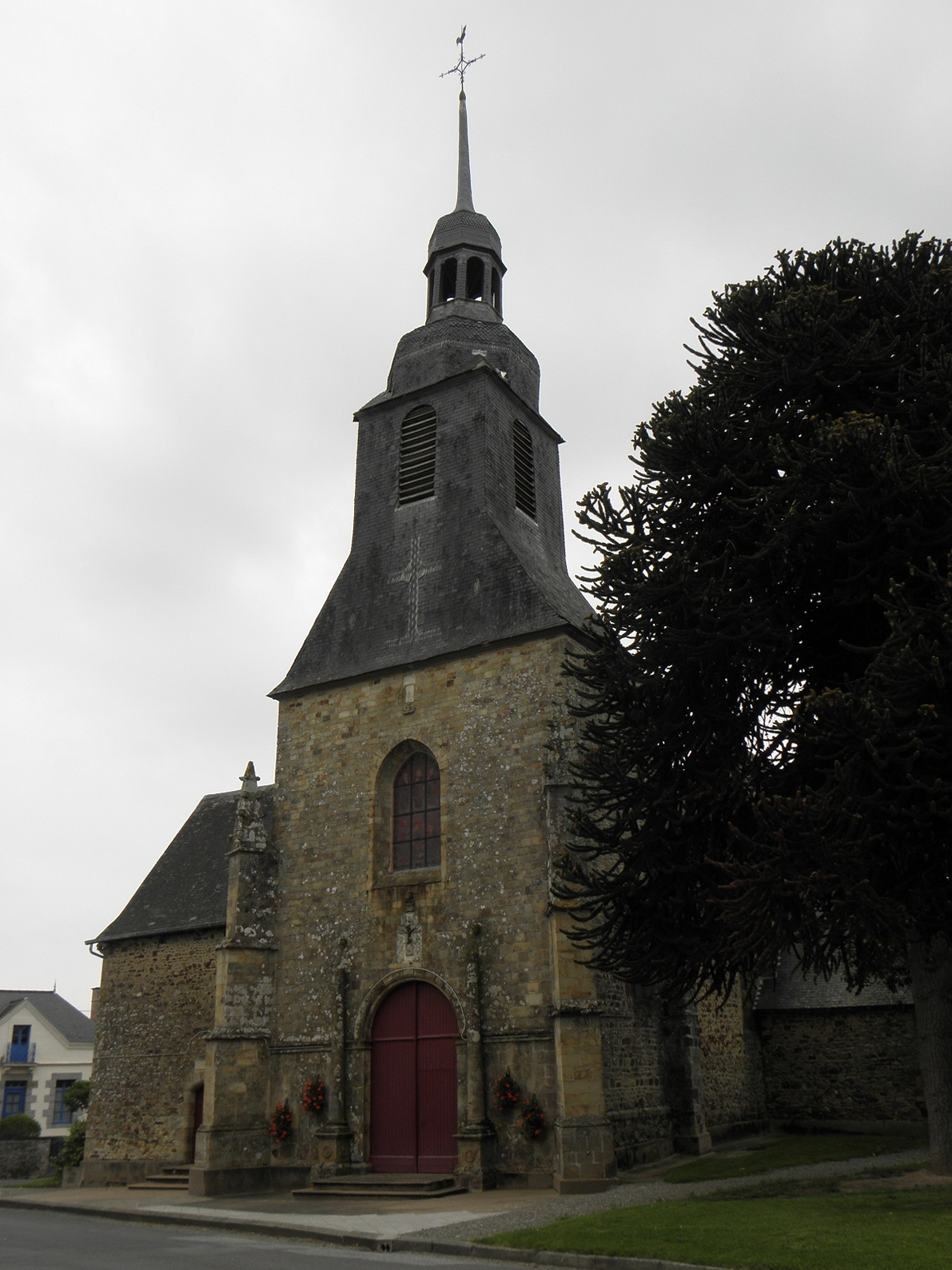
- The church in Visseiche
- Location of Visseiche
- Location within France Location within Brittany
- Coordinates: 47°57′24″N 1°17′59″W
- Country: France
- Region: Brittany
- Department: Ille-et-Vilaine
- Arrondissement: Fougères-Vitré
- Canton: La Guerche-de-Bretagne
- Intercommunality: CA Vitré Communauté

Government
  - Mayor (2020–2026): Bruno Gatel
- Area^{1}: 16.03 km^{2} (6.19 sq mi)
- Highest elevation: 91 m (299 ft)
- Lowest elevation: 42 m (138 ft)
- Population (2023): 881
  - Density: 55.0/km^{2} (142/sq mi)
- Time zone: UTC+01:00 (CET)
  - Summer (DST): UTC+02:00 (CEST)
- INSEE/Postal code: 35359 /35130
- ^{1} French Land Register data, which excludes lakes, ponds, glaciers > 1 km^{2} (0.386 sq mi or 247 acres) and river estuaries.

Visseiche (French pronunciation: [visɛʃ]; Gallo: Visèch, Breton: Gwisec'h) is a commune in the Ille-et-Vilaine department in Brittany in northwestern France.

== Population ==
Inhabitants of Visseiche are called Visseichais in French.

Historical population
Year	Pop.	±% p.a.
1968	904	—
1975	785	−2.00%
1982	723	−1.17%
1990	689	−0.60%
1999	687	−0.03%
2007	821	+2.25%
2012	807	−0.34%
2017	823	+0.39%
2023	881	+1.14%
Source: INSEE

== See also ==
- Communes of the Ille-et-Vilaine department
