= Moutiers, Ille-et-Vilaine =

Moutiers Móstiers (Gallo) Mosterioù (Breton)
- Commune
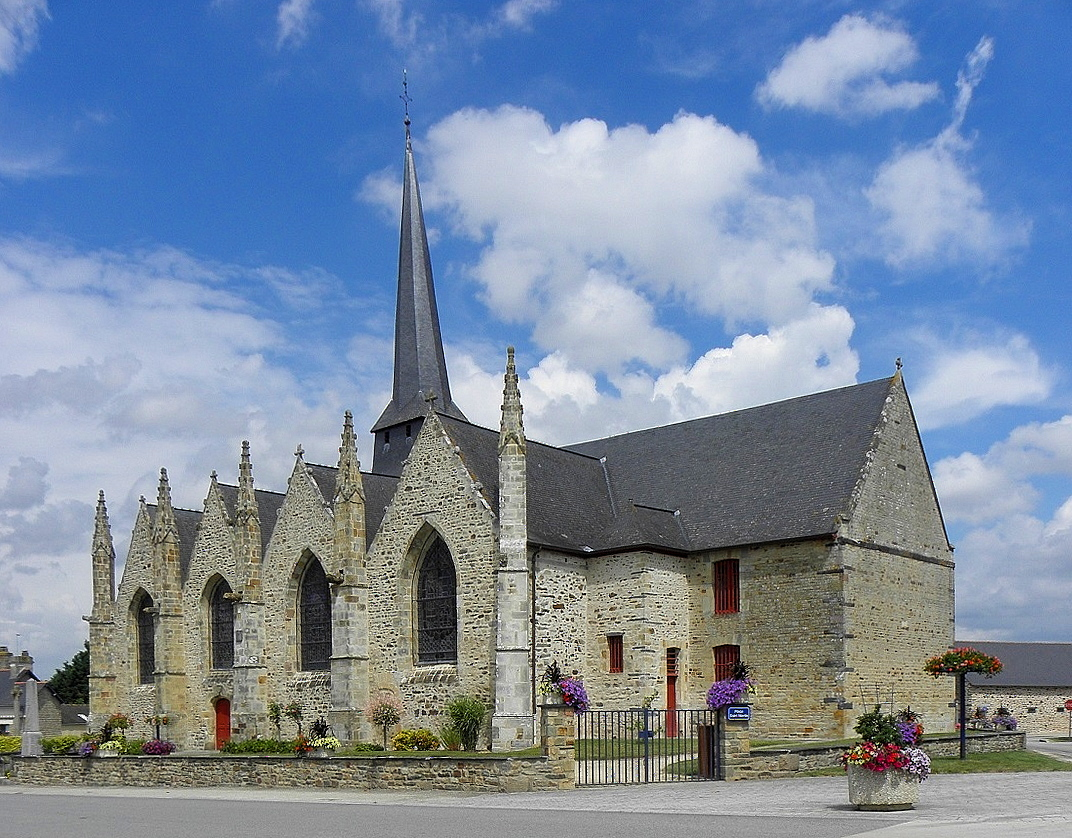
- The church of Saint-Martin
- Location of Moutiers
- Location within France Location within Brittany
- Coordinates: 47°58′05″N 1°12′45″W
- Country: France
- Region: Brittany
- Department: Ille-et-Vilaine
- Arrondissement: Fougères-Vitré
- Canton: La Guerche-de-Bretagne
- Intercommunality: CA Vitré Communauté

Government
  - Mayor (2020–2026): Yves Colas
- Area^{1}: 17.64 km^{2} (6.81 sq mi)
- Highest elevation: 108 m (354 ft)
- Lowest elevation: 51 m (167 ft)
- Population (2023): 896
  - Density: 50.8/km^{2} (132/sq mi)
- Time zone: UTC+01:00 (CET)
  - Summer (DST): UTC+02:00 (CEST)
- INSEE/Postal code: 35200 /35130
- ^{1} French Land Register data, which excludes lakes, ponds, glaciers > 1 km^{2} (0.386 sq mi or 247 acres) and river estuaries.

Moutiers (French pronunciation: [mutje]; Breton: Mousterioù; Gallo: Móstiers) is a commune in the Ille-et-Vilaine department of Brittany in northwestern France.

== Population ==
Inhabitants of Moutiers are called in French moutierrains.

Historical population
Year	Pop.	±% p.a.
1968	650	—
1975	594	−1.28%
1982	625	+0.73%
1990	638	+0.26%
1999	655	+0.29%
2007	819	+2.83%
2012	940	+2.79%
2017	929	−0.24%
2023	896	−0.60%
Source: INSEE

== See also ==
- Communes of the Ille-et-Vilaine department
