= Moulins, Ille-et-Vilaine =

Moulins Móleins (Gallo) Melined (Breton)
- Commune
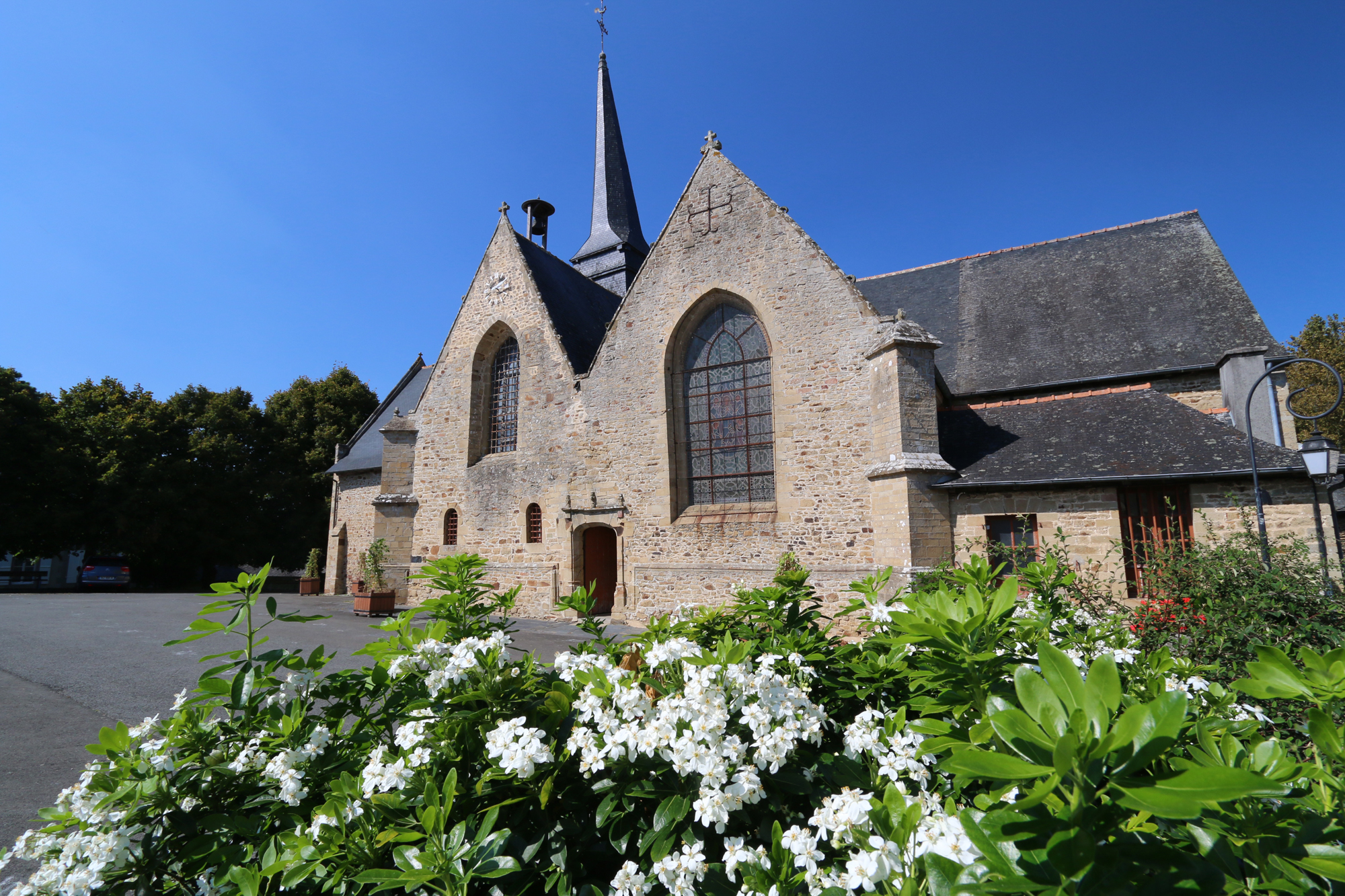
- The parish church of Saint-Martin
- Location of Moulins
- Location within France Location within Brittany
- Coordinates: 48°00′11″N 1°22′16″W
- Country: France
- Region: Brittany
- Department: Ille-et-Vilaine
- Arrondissement: Fougères-Vitré
- Canton: La Guerche-de-Bretagne
- Intercommunality: CA Vitré Communauté

Government
  - Mayor (2021–2026): Anne-Marie Morlier
- Area^{1}: 15.21 km^{2} (5.87 sq mi)
- Highest elevation: 94 m (308 ft)
- Lowest elevation: 42 m (138 ft)
- Population (2023): 724
  - Density: 47.6/km^{2} (123/sq mi)
- Time zone: UTC+01:00 (CET)
  - Summer (DST): UTC+02:00 (CEST)
- INSEE/Postal code: 35198 /35680
- ^{1} French Land Register data, which excludes lakes, ponds, glaciers > 1 km^{2} (0.386 sq mi or 247 acres) and river estuaries.

Moulins (French pronunciation: [mulɛ̃]; Breton: Melined; Gallo: Móleins) is a commune in the Ille-et-Vilaine department of Brittany in northwestern France.

== Population ==
People from Moulins are called moulinois in French.

Historical population
| Year | Pop. | ±% p.a. |
|---|---|---|
| 1968 | 603 | — |
| 1975 | 508 | −2.42% |
| 1982 | 540 | +0.88% |
| 1990 | 510 | −0.71% |
| 1999 | 562 | +1.08% |
| 2007 | 626 | +1.36% |
| 2012 | 679 | +1.64% |
| 2017 | 716 | +1.07% |
| 2023 | 724 | +0.19% |
Source: INSEE

== See also ==
- Communes of the Ille-et-Vilaine department
