= Saint-Germain-du-Pinel =

Saint-Germain-du-Pinel Sant-Jermen-ar-Bineg (Breton)
- Commune
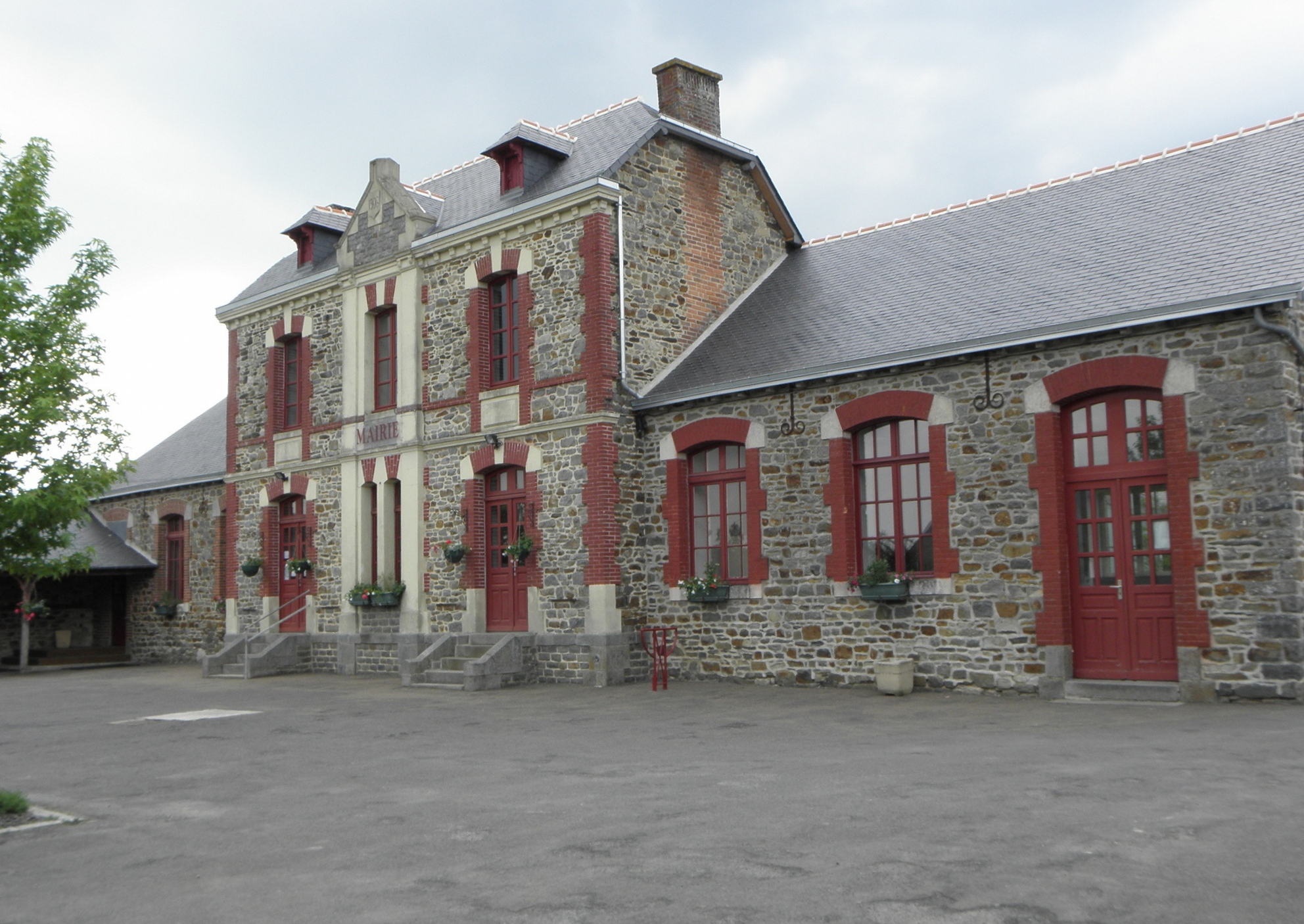
- The town hall of Saint-Germain-du-Pinel
- Location of Saint-Germain-du-Pinel
- Location within France Location within Brittany
- Coordinates: 48°00′47″N 1°09′54″W
- Country: France
- Region: Brittany
- Department: Ille-et-Vilaine
- Arrondissement: Fougères-Vitré
- Canton: La Guerche-de-Bretagne
- Intercommunality: CA Vitré Communauté

Government
  - Mayor (2020–2026): Érick Geslin
- Area^{1}: 11.30 km^{2} (4.36 sq mi)
- Highest elevation: 107 m (351 ft)
- Lowest elevation: 69 m (226 ft)
- Population (2023): 1,018
  - Density: 90.09/km^{2} (233.3/sq mi)
- Time zone: UTC+01:00 (CET)
  - Summer (DST): UTC+02:00 (CEST)
- INSEE/Postal code: 35272 /35370
- ^{1} French Land Register data, which excludes lakes, ponds, glaciers > 1 km^{2} (0.386 sq mi or 247 acres) and river estuaries.

Saint-Germain-du-Pinel (French pronunciation: [sɛ̃ ʒɛʁmɛ̃ dy pinɛl]; Breton: Sant-Jermen-ar-Bineg) is a commune in the Ille-et-Vilaine department in Brittany in northwestern France.

== Population ==
Inhabitants of Saint-Germain-du-Pinel are called germanais in French.

Historical population
Year	Pop.	±% p.a.
1968	620	—
1975	591	−0.68%
1982	605	+0.34%
1990	629	+0.49%
1999	648	+0.33%
2007	816	+2.92%
2012	880	+1.52%
2017	915	+0.78%
2023	1,018	+1.79%
Source: INSEE

== See also ==
- Communes of the Ille-et-Vilaine department
