= Eancé =

Eancé Aentieg (Breton)
- Commune
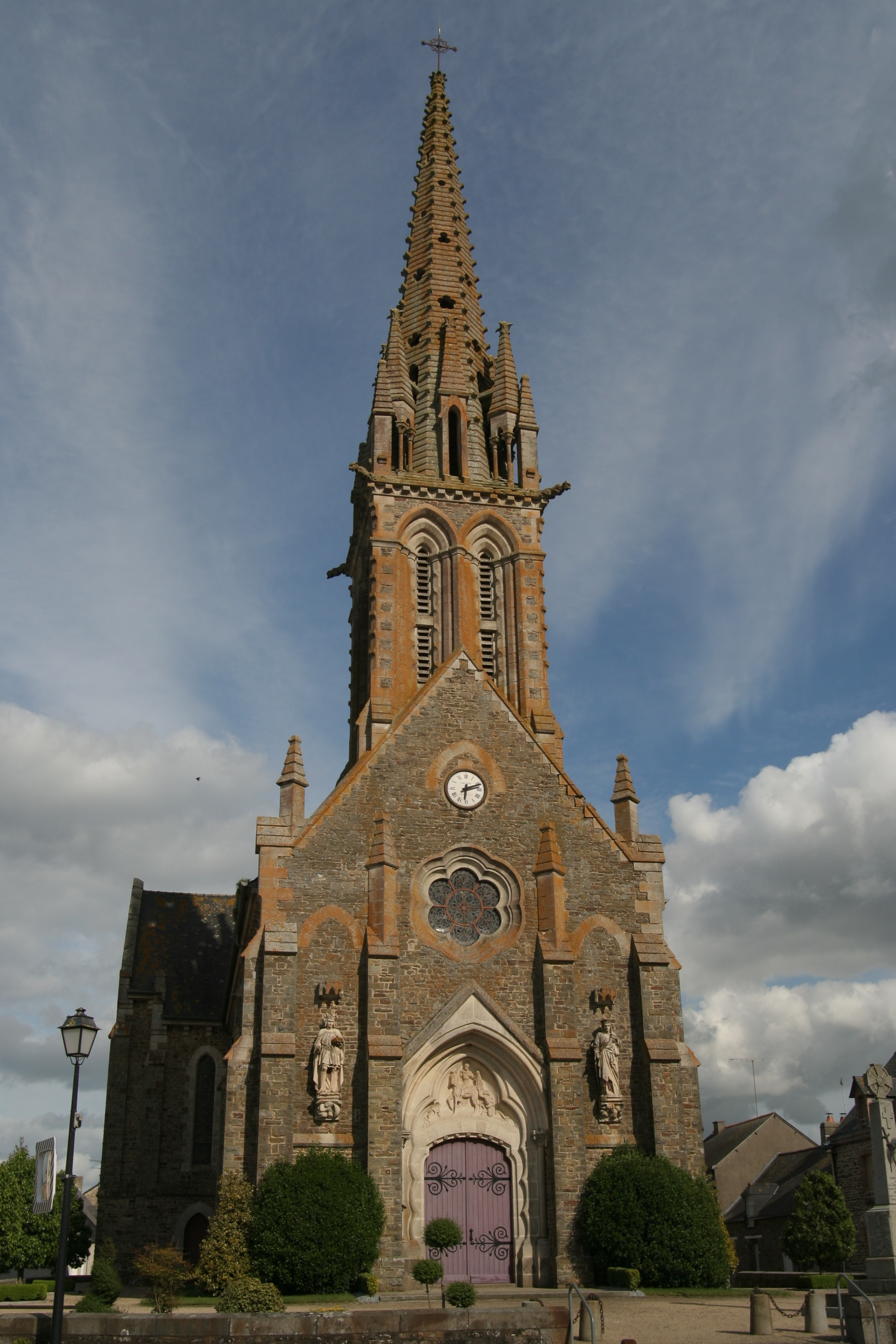
- The church of Saint-Martin

- Coat of arms
- Location of Eancé
- Location within France Location within Brittany
- Coordinates: 47°49′21″N 1°14′30″W
- Country: France
- Region: Brittany
- Department: Ille-et-Vilaine
- Arrondissement: Fougères-Vitré
- Canton: La Guerche-de-Bretagne
- Intercommunality: Roche aux Fées Communauté

Government
  - Mayor (2020–2026): Raymond Soulas
- Area^{1}: 16.50 km^{2} (6.37 sq mi)
- Highest elevation: 112 m (367 ft)
- Lowest elevation: 61 m (200 ft)
- Population (2023): 429
  - Density: 26.0/km^{2} (67.3/sq mi)
- Time zone: UTC+01:00 (CET)
  - Summer (DST): UTC+02:00 (CEST)
- INSEE/Postal code: 35103 /35640
- ^{1} French Land Register data, which excludes lakes, ponds, glaciers > 1 km^{2} (0.386 sq mi or 247 acres) and river estuaries.

Eancé (French pronunciation: [eɑ̃se]; Breton: Aentieg) is a commune in the Ille-et-Vilaine department in Brittany in northwestern France.

== Geography ==
The river Semnon flows northwest through the commune.

== Population ==
Inhabitants of Eancé are called Éancéens in French.

Historical population
Year	Pop.	±% p.a.
1968	568	—
1975	466	−2.79%
1982	387	−2.62%
1990	336	−1.75%
1999	338	+0.07%
2007	355	+0.62%
2012	393	+2.05%
2017	403	+0.50%
2023	429	+1.05%
Source: INSEE

== See also ==
- Communes of the Ille-et-Vilaine department
