= Moussé =

Moussé Móczaé (Gallo) Moc'heg (Breton)
- Commune
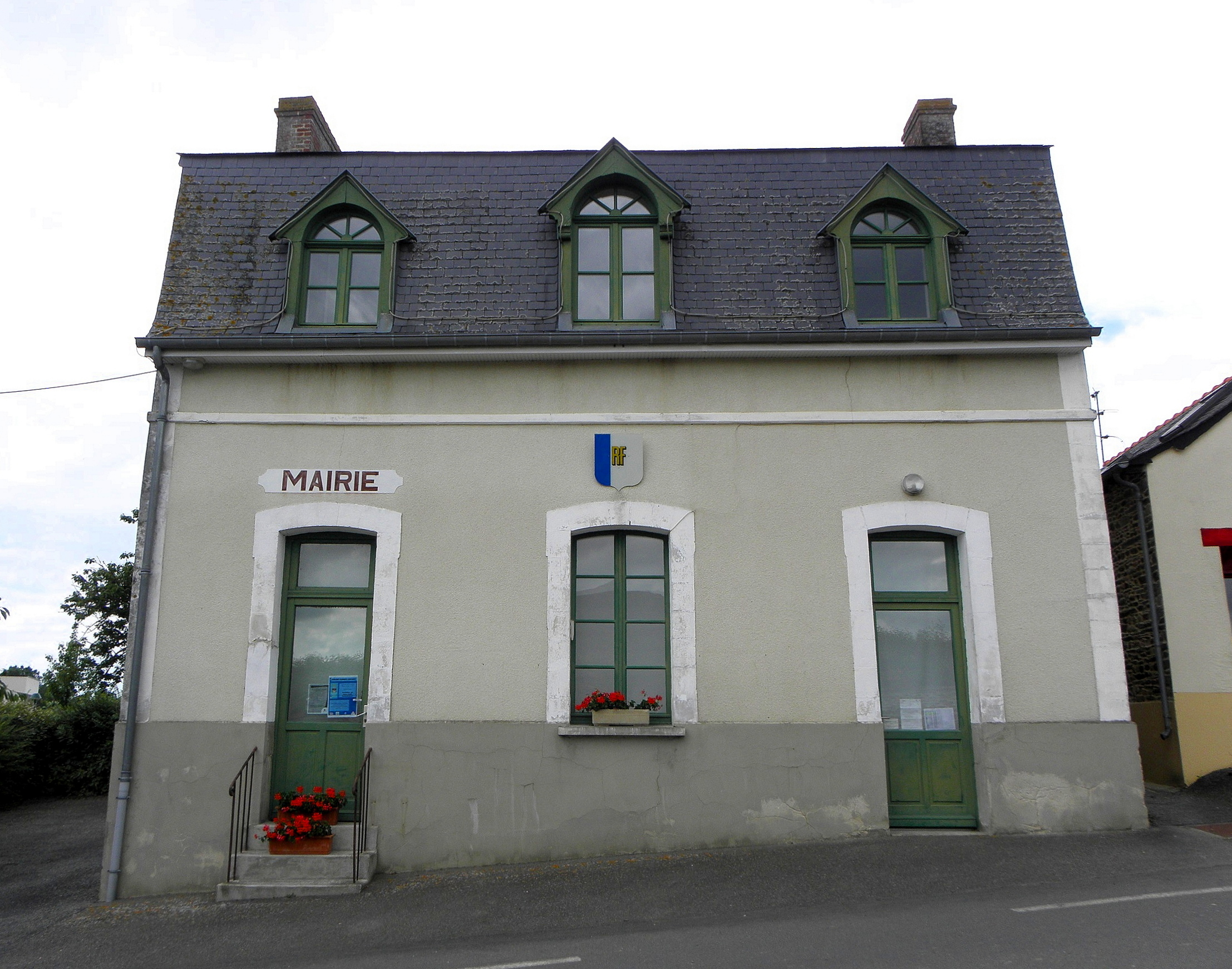
- The town hall of Moussé
- Location of Moussé
- Location within France Location within Brittany
- Coordinates: 47°55′26″N 1°16′08″W
- Country: France
- Region: Brittany
- Department: Ille-et-Vilaine
- Arrondissement: Fougères-Vitré
- Canton: La Guerche-de-Bretagne
- Intercommunality: CA Vitré Communauté

Government
  - Mayor (2020–2026): Gilbert Gérard
- Area^{1}: 3.37 km^{2} (1.30 sq mi)
- Highest elevation: 87 m (285 ft)
- Lowest elevation: 52 m (171 ft)
- Population (2023): 293
  - Density: 86.9/km^{2} (225/sq mi)
- Time zone: UTC+01:00 (CET)
  - Summer (DST): UTC+02:00 (CEST)
- INSEE/Postal code: 35199 /35130
- ^{1} French Land Register data, which excludes lakes, ponds, glaciers > 1 km^{2} (0.386 sq mi or 247 acres) and river estuaries.

Moussé (French pronunciation: [muse]; Breton: Moc'heg; Gallo: Móczaé) is a commune in the Ille-et-Vilaine department in Brittany in northwestern France.

== Population ==
The inhabitants of Moussé are known as Mousséens in French.

Historical population
Year	Pop.	±% p.a.
1968	134	—
1975	117	−1.92%
1982	111	−0.75%
1990	137	+2.67%
1999	200	+4.29%
2007	311	+5.67%
2012	315	+0.26%
2017	336	+1.30%
2023	293	−2.26%
Source: INSEE

== See also ==
- Communes of the Ille-et-Vilaine department
