= Coësmes =

Coësmes Coèsm (Gallo) Koem (Breton)
- Commune
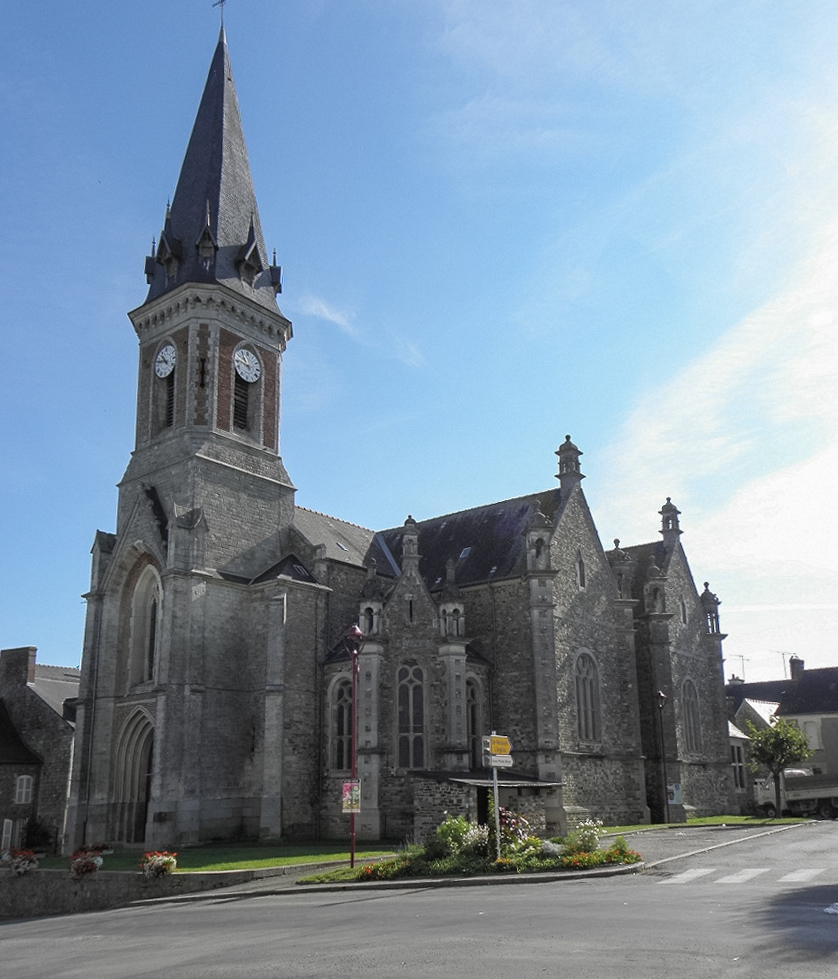
- Saint Pierre church

- Coat of arms
- Location of Coësmes
- Location within France Location within Brittany
- Coordinates: 47°53′02″N 1°26′22″W
- Country: France
- Region: Brittany
- Department: Ille-et-Vilaine
- Arrondissement: Fougères-Vitré
- Canton: La Guerche-de-Bretagne
- Intercommunality: Roche-aux-Fées

Government
  - Mayor (2020–2026): Luc Gallard
- Area^{1}: 23.24 km^{2} (8.97 sq mi)
- Highest elevation: 107 m (351 ft)
- Lowest elevation: 47 m (154 ft)
- Population (2023): 1,426
  - Density: 61.36/km^{2} (158.9/sq mi)
- Time zone: UTC+01:00 (CET)
  - Summer (DST): UTC+02:00 (CEST)
- INSEE/Postal code: 35082 /35134
- ^{1} French Land Register data, which excludes lakes, ponds, glaciers > 1 km^{2} (0.386 sq mi or 247 acres) and river estuaries.

Coësmes (French pronunciation: [kɔɛm]; Gallo: Coèsm, Breton: Koem) is a commune in the Ille-et-Vilaine department in Brittany in northwestern France.

== Population ==
Historical population
Year	Pop.	±% p.a.
1968	1,191	—
1975	1,087	−1.30%
1982	1,035	−0.70%
1990	1,078	+0.51%
1999	1,073	−0.05%
2007	1,345	+2.86%
2012	1,438	+1.35%
2017	1,474	+0.50%
2023	1,426	−0.55%
Source: INSEE

Inhabitants of Coësmes are called Coësmois in French.

== See also ==
- Communes of the Ille-et-Vilaine department
