= Drouges =

Drouges Drouj (Gallo) Drougez (Breton)
- Commune
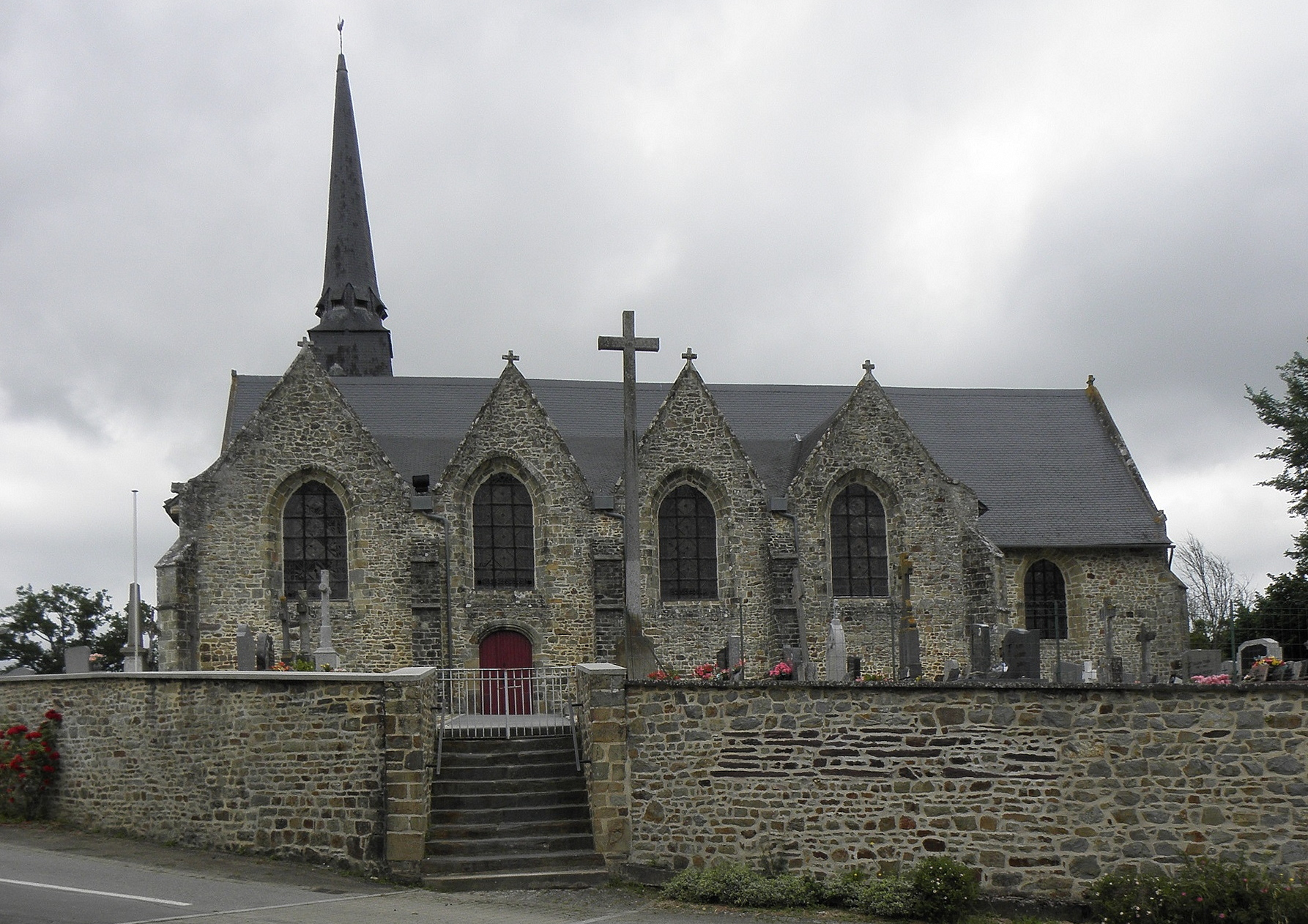
- The church of Saint-Pierre, in Drouges

- Coat of arms
- Location of Drouges
- Location within France Location within Brittany
- Coordinates: 47°54′09″N 1°15′49″W
- Country: France
- Region: Brittany
- Department: Ille-et-Vilaine
- Arrondissement: Fougères-Vitré
- Canton: La Guerche-de-Bretagne
- Intercommunality: CA Vitré Communauté

Government
  - Mayor (2020–2026): Patricia Marsollier
- Area^{1}: 11.63 km^{2} (4.49 sq mi)
- Highest elevation: 109 m (358 ft)
- Lowest elevation: 57 m (187 ft)
- Population (2023): 502
  - Density: 43.2/km^{2} (112/sq mi)
- Time zone: UTC+01:00 (CET)
  - Summer (DST): UTC+02:00 (CEST)
- INSEE/Postal code: 35102 /35130
- ^{1} French Land Register data, which excludes lakes, ponds, glaciers > 1 km^{2} (0.386 sq mi or 247 acres) and river estuaries.

Drouges (French pronunciation: [dʁuʒ]; Gallo: Drouj, Breton: Drougez) is a commune in the Ille-et-Vilaine department in Brittany in northwestern France.

== Population ==
Inhabitants of Drouges are called Drougeais in French.

Historical population
Year	Pop.	±% p.a.
1968	564	—
1975	488	−2.05%
1982	450	−1.15%
1990	397	−1.55%
1999	419	+0.60%
2007	465	+1.31%
2012	548	+3.34%
2017	519	−1.08%
2023	502	−0.55%
Source: INSEE

== See also ==
- Communes of the Ille-et-Vilaine department
