= Forges-la-Forêt =

Forges-la-Forêt Lez Forj-la-Forést (Gallo) Gorelioù-ar-C’hoad (Breton)
- Commune
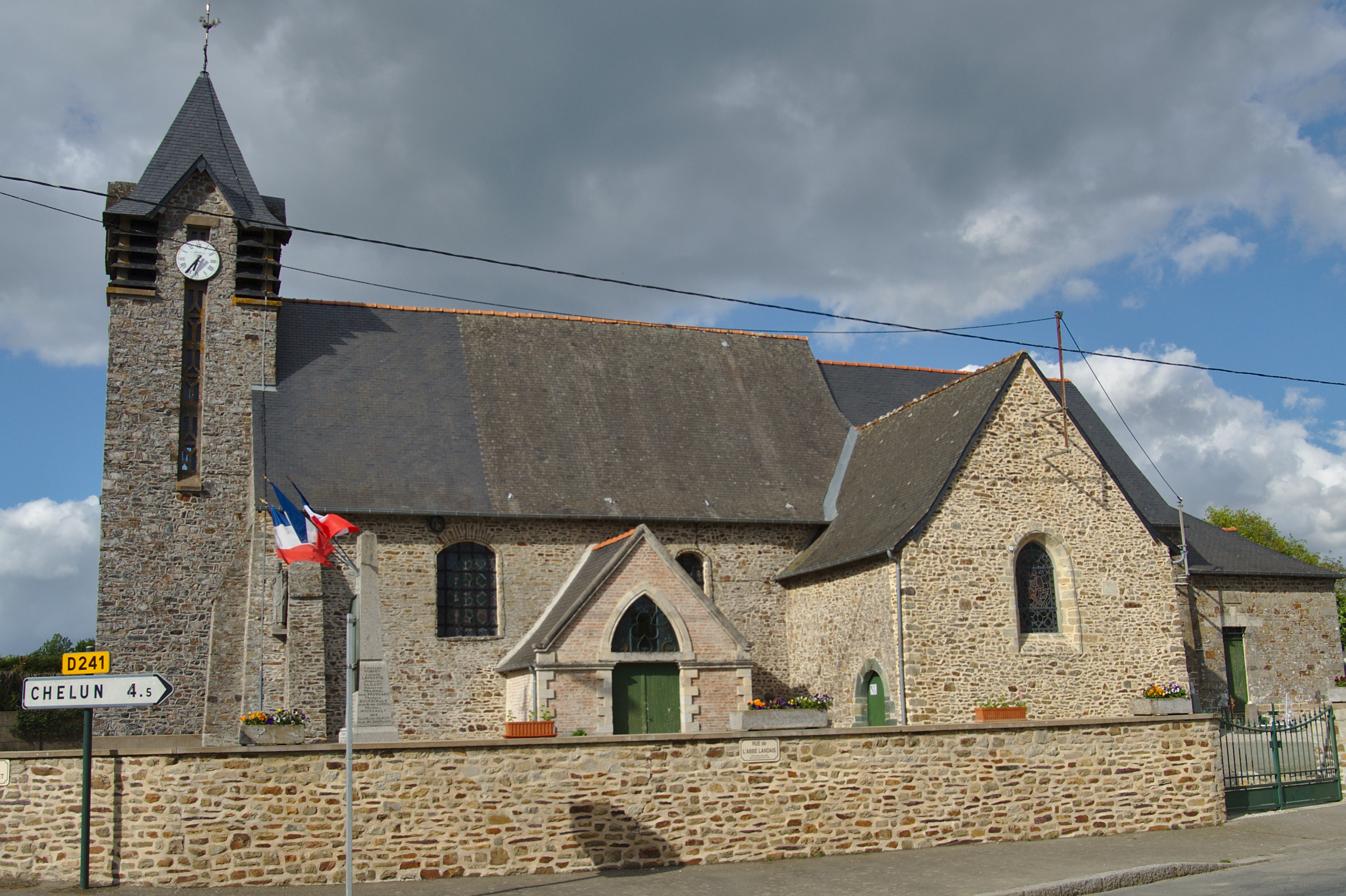
- The church of Saint-Martin
- Location of Forges-la-Forêt
- Location within France Location within Brittany
- Coordinates: 47°51′35″N 1°16′48″W
- Country: France
- Region: Brittany
- Department: Ille-et-Vilaine
- Arrondissement: Fougères-Vitré
- Canton: La Guerche-de-Bretagne
- Intercommunality: Roche-aux-Fées

Government
  - Mayor (2020–2026): Yves Boulet
- Area^{1}: 6.04 km^{2} (2.33 sq mi)
- Highest elevation: 111 m (364 ft)
- Lowest elevation: 70 m (230 ft)
- Population (2023): 268
  - Density: 44.4/km^{2} (115/sq mi)
- Time zone: UTC+01:00 (CET)
  - Summer (DST): UTC+02:00 (CEST)
- INSEE/Postal code: 35114 /35640
- ^{1} French Land Register data, which excludes lakes, ponds, glaciers > 1 km^{2} (0.386 sq mi or 247 acres) and river estuaries.

Forges-la-Forêt (French pronunciation: [fɔʁʒ la fɔʁɛ]; Gallo: Lez Forj-la-Forést, Breton: Govelioù-ar-C'hoad) is a commune in the Ille-et-Vilaine department of Brittany in north-western France.

== Population ==
Inhabitants of Forges-la-Forêt are called Fèvres in French.

Historical population
Year	Pop.	±% p.a.
1968	316	—
1975	287	−1.37%
1982	267	−1.03%
1990	275	+0.37%
1999	242	−1.41%
2007	272	+1.47%
2012	276	+0.29%
2017	265	−0.81%
2023	268	+0.19%
Source: INSEE

== See also ==
- Communes of the Ille-et-Vilaine department
