= La Selle-Guerchaise =

La Selle-Guerchaise La Cèll-Gèrcheizz (Gallo) Kell-Gwerc'h (Breton)
- Commune
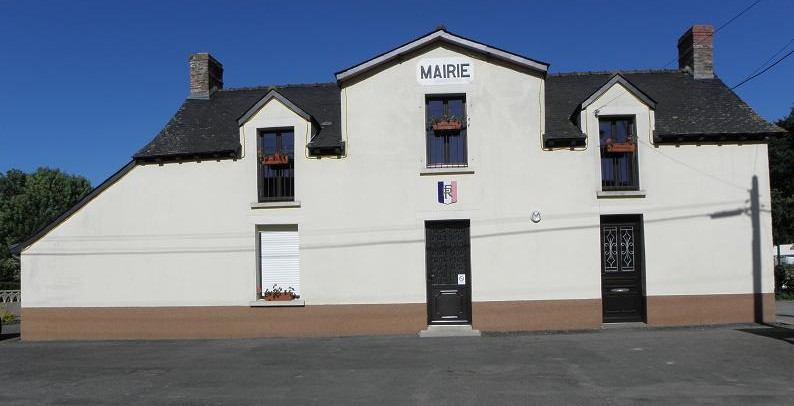
- The town hall of La Selle-Guerchaise
- Location of La Selle-Guerchaise
- Location within France Location within Brittany
- Coordinates: 47°56′41″N 1°10′20″W
- Country: France
- Region: Brittany
- Department: Ille-et-Vilaine
- Arrondissement: Fougères-Vitré
- Canton: La Guerche-de-Bretagne
- Intercommunality: CA Vitré Communauté

Government
  - Mayor (2020–2026): Ludovic Le Squer
- Area^{1}: 2.14 km^{2} (0.83 sq mi)
- Highest elevation: 95 m (312 ft)
- Lowest elevation: 65 m (213 ft)
- Population (2023): 153
  - Density: 71.5/km^{2} (185/sq mi)
- Time zone: UTC+01:00 (CET)
  - Summer (DST): UTC+02:00 (CEST)
- INSEE/Postal code: 35325 /35130
- ^{1} French Land Register data, which excludes lakes, ponds, glaciers > 1 km^{2} (0.386 sq mi or 247 acres) and river estuaries.

La Selle-Guerchaise (French pronunciation: [la sɛl ɡɛʁʃɛz]; Breton: Kell-Gwerc'h; Gallo: La Cèll-Gèrcheizz) is a commune in the Ille-et-Vilaine department in Brittany in northwestern France.

== Population ==
Inhabitants of La Selle-Guerchaise are called Sellais in French.

Historical population
Year	Pop.	±% p.a.
1968	168	—
1975	136	−2.97%
1982	124	−1.31%
1990	121	−0.31%
1999	128	+0.63%
2007	146	+1.66%
2012	154	+1.07%
2017	154	+0.00%
2023	153	−0.11%
Source: INSEE

== See also ==
- Communes of the Ille-et-Vilaine department
