= Rannée =

Rannée Ranaé (Gallo) Radenez (Breton)
- Commune
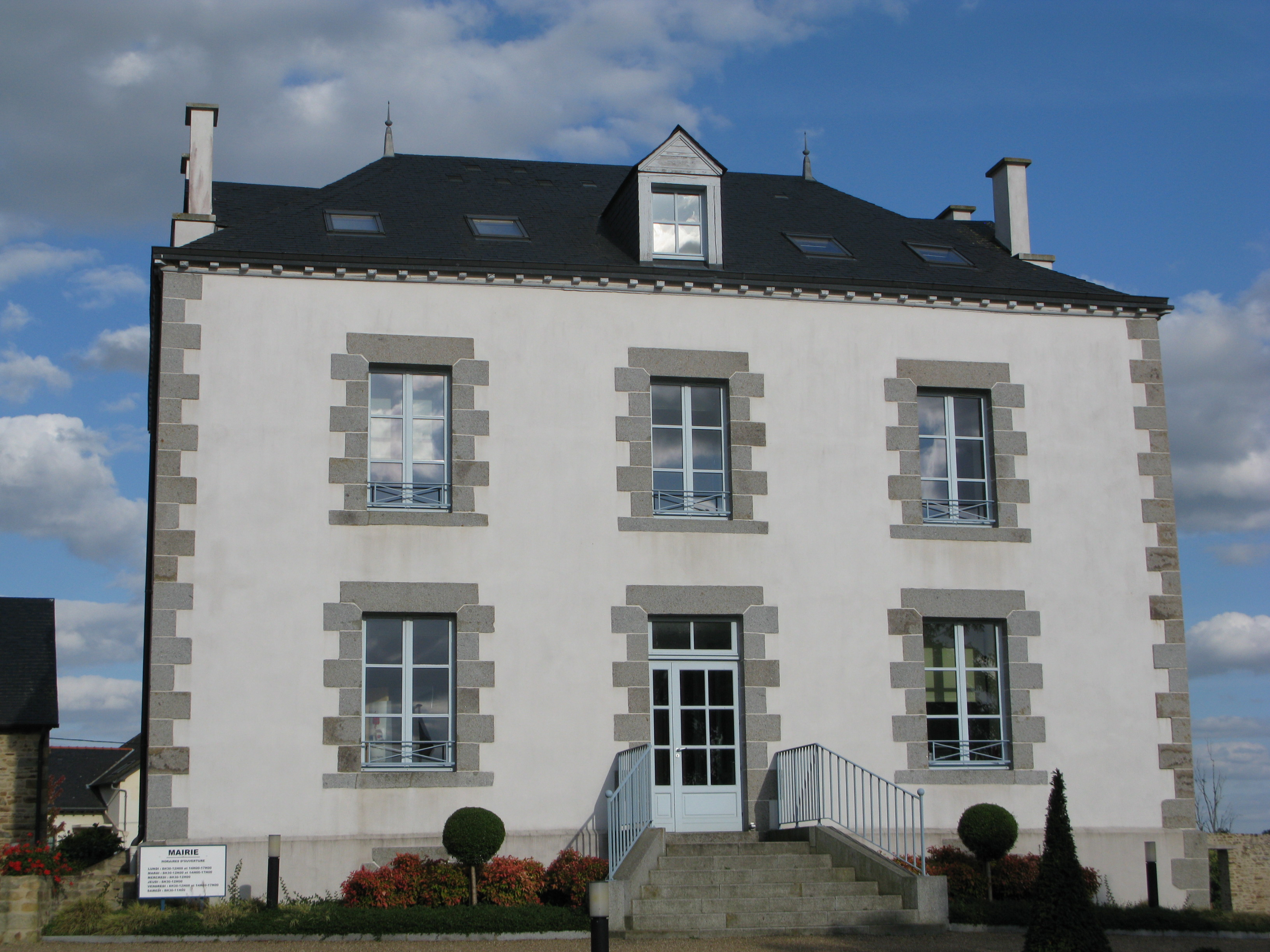
- The town hall in Rannée
- Location of Rannée
- Location within France Location within Brittany
- Coordinates: 47°55′30″N 1°14′22″W
- Country: France
- Region: Brittany
- Department: Ille-et-Vilaine
- Arrondissement: Fougères-Vitré
- Canton: La Guerche-de-Bretagne
- Intercommunality: CA Vitré Communauté

Government
  - Mayor (2024–2026): Karine Morel
- Area^{1}: 51.95 km^{2} (20.06 sq mi)
- Highest elevation: 114 m (374 ft)
- Lowest elevation: 55 m (180 ft)
- Population (2023): 1,100
  - Density: 21/km^{2} (55/sq mi)
- Time zone: UTC+01:00 (CET)
  - Summer (DST): UTC+02:00 (CEST)
- INSEE/Postal code: 35235 /35130
- ^{1} French Land Register data, which excludes lakes, ponds, glaciers > 1 km^{2} (0.386 sq mi or 247 acres) and river estuaries.

Rannée (French pronunciation: [ʁane]; Gallo: Ranaé, Breton: Radenez) is a commune in the Ille-et-Vilaine department of Brittany in northwestern France.

== Population ==
Inhabitants of Rannée are called rannéens in French.

Historical population
| Year | Pop. | ±% p.a. |
|---|---|---|
| 1968 | 1,160 | — |
| 1975 | 1,114 | −0.58% |
| 1982 | 1,115 | +0.01% |
| 1990 | 1,109 | −0.07% |
| 1999 | 1,111 | +0.02% |
| 2007 | 1,159 | +0.53% |
| 2012 | 1,133 | −0.45% |
| 2017 | 1,094 | −0.70% |
| 2023 | 1,100 | +0.09% |
Source: INSEE

== See also ==
- Communes of the Ille-et-Vilaine department
