= Thourie =

Thourie Tóric (Gallo) Tourig (Breton)
- Commune
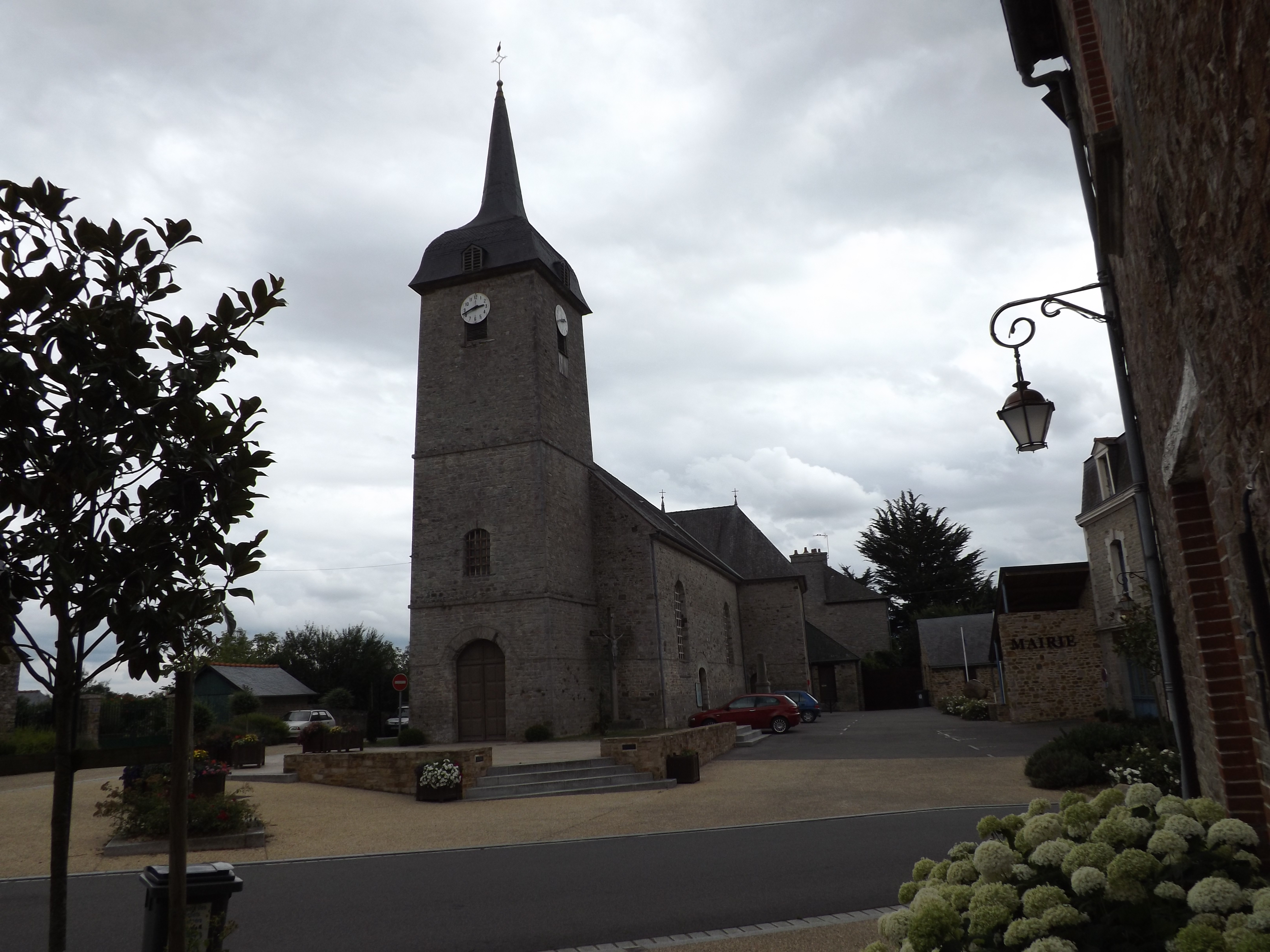
- The church in Thourie
- Location of Thourie
- Location within France Location within Brittany
- Coordinates: 47°51′18″N 1°28′47″W
- Country: France
- Region: Brittany
- Department: Ille-et-Vilaine
- Arrondissement: Fougères-Vitré
- Canton: La Guerche-de-Bretagne
- Intercommunality: Roche-aux-Fées

Government
  - Mayor (2020–2026): Daniel Bordier
- Area^{1}: 24.04 km^{2} (9.28 sq mi)
- Highest elevation: 97 m (318 ft)
- Lowest elevation: 34 m (112 ft)
- Population (2023): 868
  - Density: 36.1/km^{2} (93.5/sq mi)
- Time zone: UTC+01:00 (CET)
  - Summer (DST): UTC+02:00 (CEST)
- INSEE/Postal code: 35335 /35134
- ^{1} French Land Register data, which excludes lakes, ponds, glaciers > 1 km^{2} (0.386 sq mi or 247 acres) and river estuaries.

Thourie (French pronunciation: [tuʁi]; Gallo: Tóric, Breton: Tourig) is a commune in the Ille-et-Vilaine department in Brittany in northwestern France.

== Geography ==
The ruisseau de la Couyère forms all of the commune's western border, then flows into the Semnon, which forms all of its southern border.

== Population ==
Inhabitants of Thourie are called Thourisiens in French.

Historical population
Year	Pop.	±% p.a.
1968	828	—
1975	690	−2.57%
1982	591	−2.19%
1990	501	−2.04%
1999	526	+0.54%
2007	671	+3.09%
2012	712	+1.19%
2017	802	+2.41%
2023	868	+1.33%
Source: INSEE

== See also ==
- Communes of the Ille-et-Vilaine department
