= Availles-sur-Seiche =

Availles-sur-Seiche Avaylh (Gallo) Avallod-ar-Sec'h (Breton)
- Commune
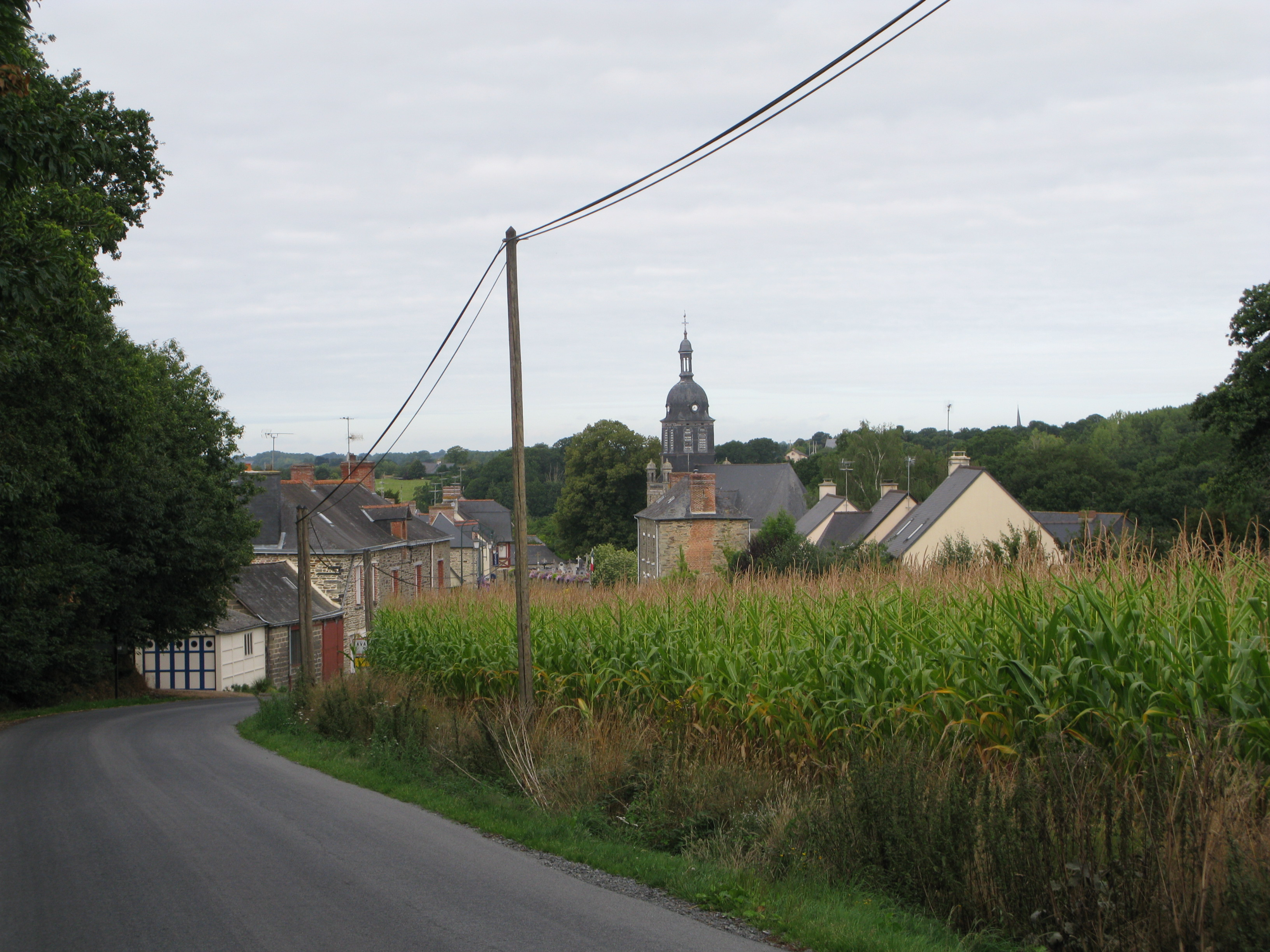
- A general view of Availles-sur-Seiche
- Location of Availles-sur-Seiche
- Location within France Location within Brittany
- Coordinates: 47°57′43″N 1°11′41″W
- Country: France
- Region: Brittany
- Department: Ille-et-Vilaine
- Arrondissement: Fougères-Vitré
- Canton: La Guerche-de-Bretagne
- Intercommunality: CA Vitré Communauté

Government
  - Mayor (2020–2026): Élizabeth Carré
- Area^{1}: 11.06 km^{2} (4.27 sq mi)
- Elevation: 80 m (260 ft)
- Highest elevation: 89 m (292 ft)
- Lowest elevation: 52 m (171 ft)
- Population (2023): 630
  - Density: 57/km^{2} (150/sq mi)
- Time zone: UTC+01:00 (CET)
  - Summer (DST): UTC+02:00 (CEST)
- INSEE/Postal code: 35008 /35130
- ^{1} French Land Register data, which excludes lakes, ponds, glaciers > 1 km^{2} (0.386 sq mi or 247 acres) and river estuaries.

Availles-sur-Seiche (French pronunciation: [avaj syʁ sɛʃ]; Breton: Avallod-ar-Sec'h; Gallo: Avaylh) is a commune in the Ille-et-Vilaine department, in Brittany, in northwestern France.

== Population ==
Historical population
| Year | Pop. | ±% p.a. |
|---|---|---|
| 1968 | 475 | — |
| 1975 | 448 | −0.83% |
| 1982 | 433 | −0.49% |
| 1990 | 425 | −0.23% |
| 1999 | 512 | +2.09% |
| 2007 | 666 | +3.34% |
| 2012 | 693 | +0.80% |
| 2017 | 684 | −0.26% |
| 2023 | 630 | −1.36% |
Source: INSEE

Inhabitants of Availles-sur-Seiche are called Availlais in French.

== See also ==
- Communes of the Ille-et-Vilaine department
