= Marcillé-Robert =

Marcillé-Robert Marcilhae-Robert (Gallo) Marc'helleg-Roperzh (Breton)
- Commune
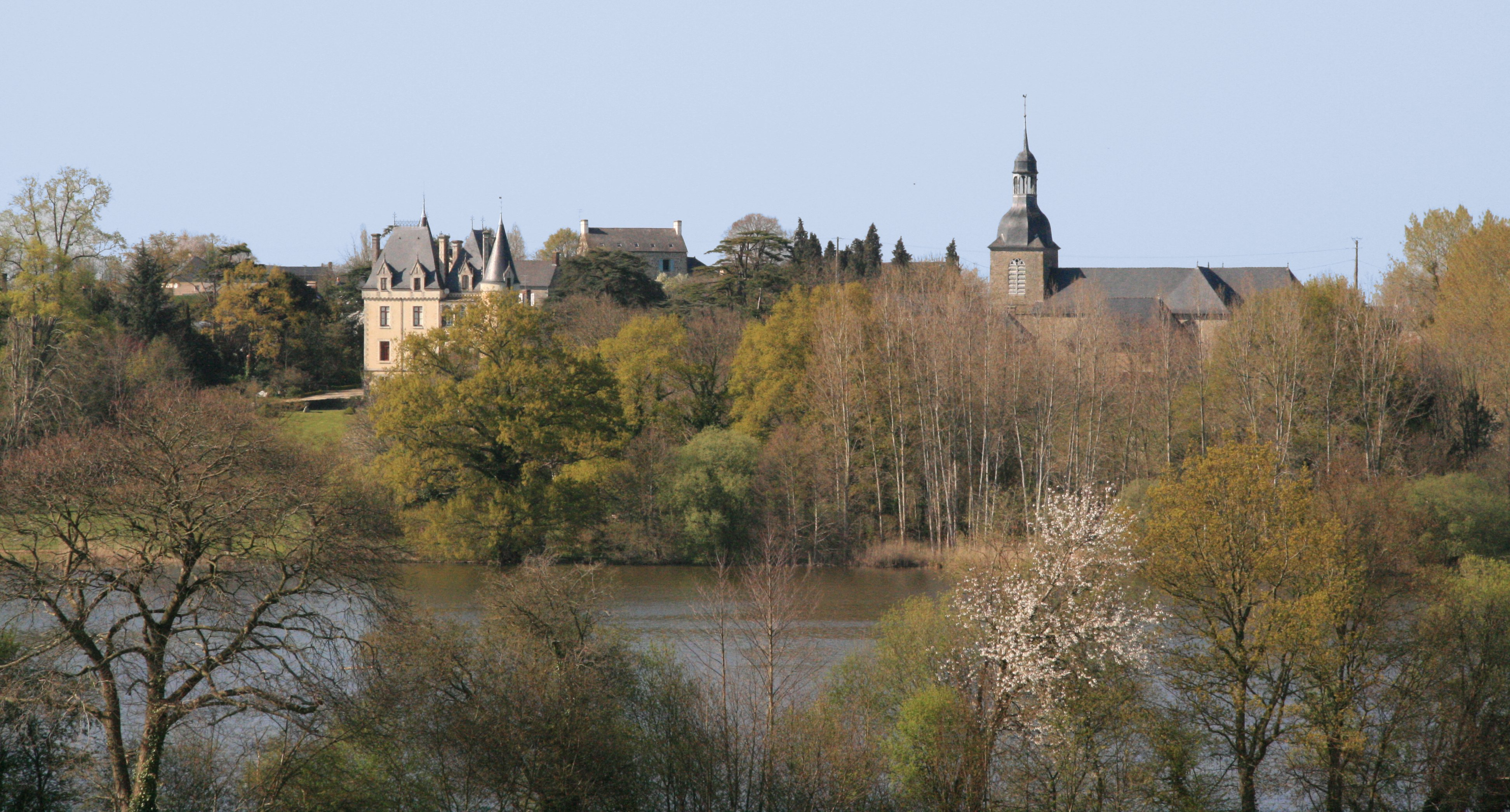
- A general view of Marcillé-Robert

- Coat of arms
- Location of Marcillé-Robert
- Location within France Location within Brittany
- Coordinates: 47°57′02″N 1°21′36″W
- Country: France
- Region: Brittany
- Department: Ille-et-Vilaine
- Arrondissement: Fougères-Vitré
- Canton: La Guerche-de-Bretagne
- Intercommunality: Roche-aux-Fées

Government
  - Mayor (2020–2026): Laurent Divay
- Area^{1}: 20.30 km^{2} (7.84 sq mi)
- Highest elevation: 87 m (285 ft)
- Lowest elevation: 37 m (121 ft)
- Population (2023): 1,017
  - Density: 50.10/km^{2} (129.8/sq mi)
- Time zone: UTC+01:00 (CET)
  - Summer (DST): UTC+02:00 (CEST)
- INSEE/Postal code: 35165 /35240
- ^{1} French Land Register data, which excludes lakes, ponds, glaciers > 1 km^{2} (0.386 sq mi or 247 acres) and river estuaries.

Marcillé-Robert (French pronunciation: [maʁsije ʁɔbɛʁ]; Breton: Marc'helleg-Roperzh; Gallo: Marcilhae-Robert) is a commune in the Ille-et-Vilaine department of Brittany in northwestern France.

== Population ==
Inhabitants of Marcillé-Robert are called in French marcilléens.

Historical population
Year	Pop.	±% p.a.
1968	983	—
1975	943	−0.59%
1982	837	−1.69%
1990	837	+0.00%
1999	856	+0.25%
2007	931	+1.06%
2012	964	+0.70%
2017	959	−0.10%
2023	1,017	+0.98%
Source: INSEE

== See also ==
- Communes of the Ille-et-Vilaine department
