= Torcé =

Torcé Torczae (Gallo) Tourc'heg (Breton)
- Commune
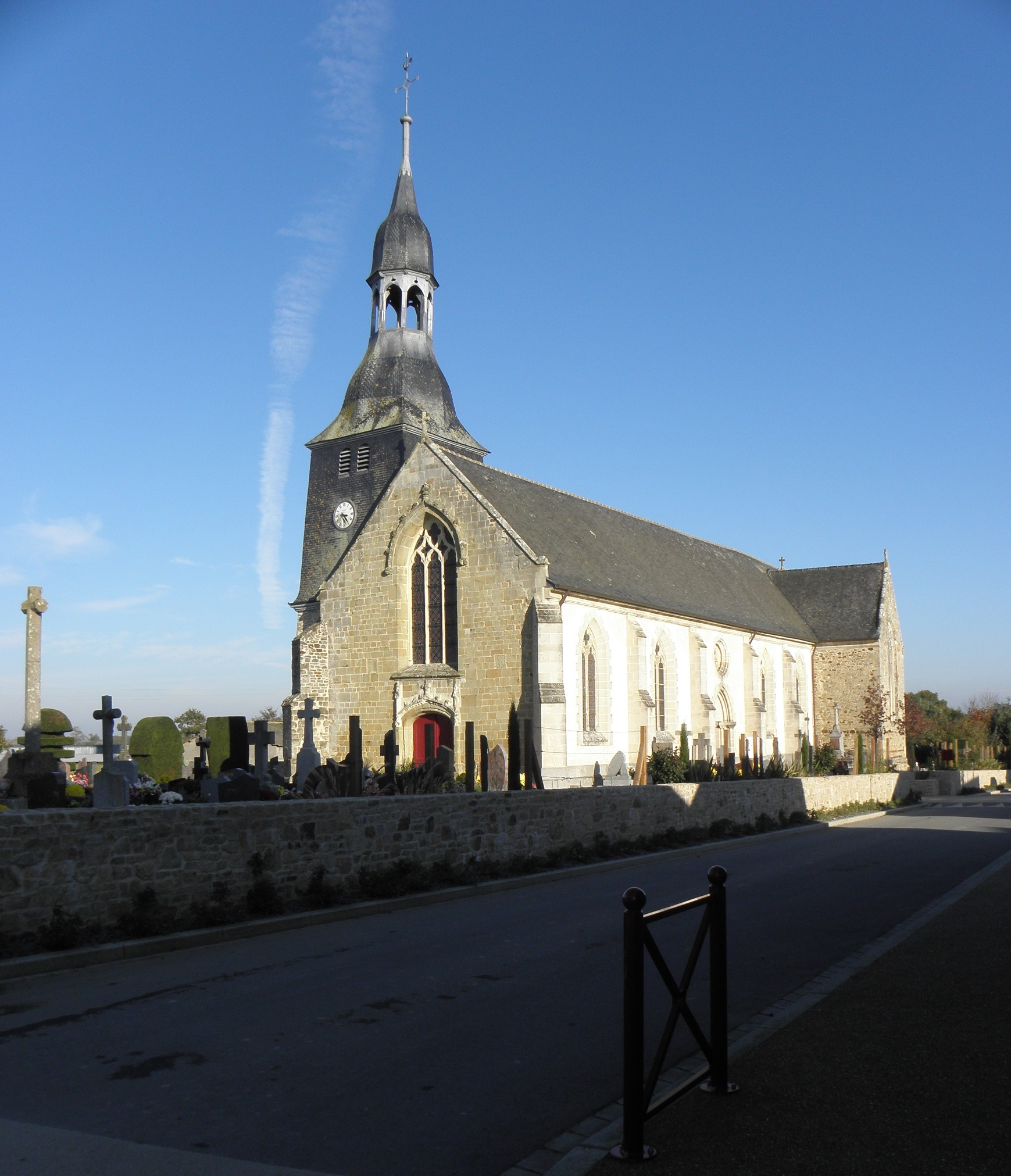
- The church in Torcé

- Coat of arms
- Location of Torcé
- Location within France Location within Brittany
- Coordinates: 48°03′45″N 1°15′52″W
- Country: France
- Region: Brittany
- Department: Ille-et-Vilaine
- Arrondissement: Fougères-Vitré
- Canton: La Guerche-de-Bretagne
- Intercommunality: CA Vitré Communauté

Government
  - Mayor (2020–2026): Yannick Fouet
- Area^{1}: 14.03 km^{2} (5.42 sq mi)
- Highest elevation: 104 m (341 ft)
- Lowest elevation: 69 m (226 ft)
- Population (2023): 1,281
  - Density: 91.30/km^{2} (236.5/sq mi)
- Time zone: UTC+01:00 (CET)
  - Summer (DST): UTC+02:00 (CEST)
- INSEE/Postal code: 35338 /35370
- ^{1} French Land Register data, which excludes lakes, ponds, glaciers > 1 km^{2} (0.386 sq mi or 247 acres) and river estuaries.

Torcé (French pronunciation: [tɔʁse]; Breton: Tourc'heg; Gallo: Torczae) is a commune in the Ille-et-Vilaine department in Brittany in northwestern France.

== Population ==
Inhabitants of Torcé are called Torcéens in French.

Historical population
Year	Pop.	±% p.a.
1968	596	—
1975	592	−0.10%
1982	681	+2.02%
1990	788	+1.84%
1999	916	+1.69%
2007	1,142	+2.79%
2012	1,130	−0.21%
2017	1,187	+0.99%
2023	1,281	+1.28%
Source: INSEE

== See also ==
- Communes of the Ille-et-Vilaine department
