= Retiers =

Retiers Restier (Gallo) Rester (Breton)
- Commune
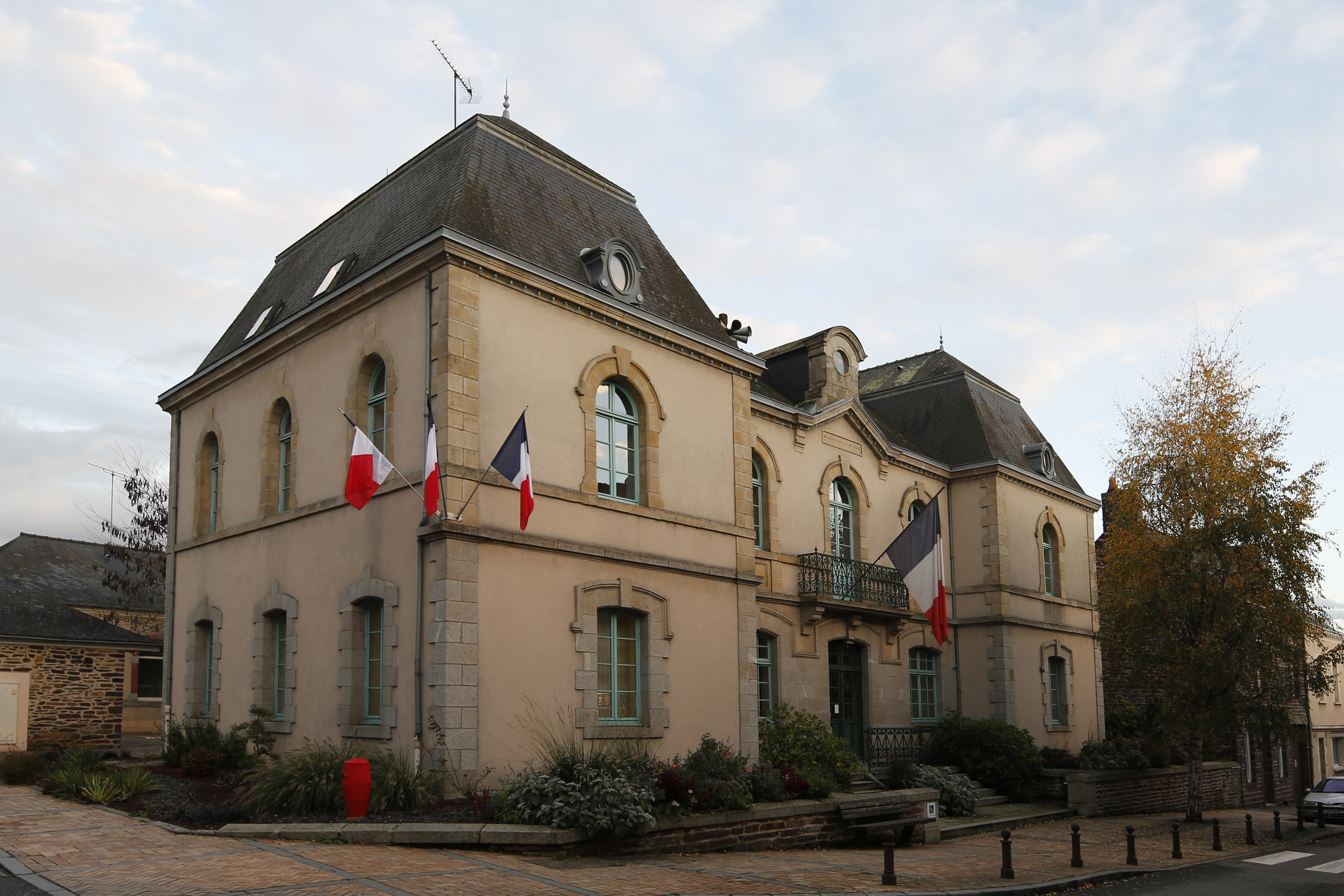
- Town hall

- Coat of arms
- Location of Retiers
- Location within France Location within Brittany
- Coordinates: 47°54′51″N 1°22′50″W
- Country: France
- Region: Brittany
- Department: Ille-et-Vilaine
- Arrondissement: Fougères-Vitré
- Canton: La Guerche-de-Bretagne
- Intercommunality: Roche-aux-Fées

Government
  - Mayor (2020–2026): Thierry Restif
- Area^{1}: 41.38 km^{2} (15.98 sq mi)
- Highest elevation: 120 m (390 ft)
- Lowest elevation: 41 m (135 ft)
- Population (2023): 4,566
  - Density: 110.3/km^{2} (285.8/sq mi)
- Time zone: UTC+01:00 (CET)
  - Summer (DST): UTC+02:00 (CEST)
- INSEE/Postal code: 35239 /35240
- ^{1} French Land Register data, which excludes lakes, ponds, glaciers > 1 km^{2} (0.386 sq mi or 247 acres) and river estuaries.

Retiers (French pronunciation: [ʁətje]; Breton: Rester; Gallo: Restier) is a commune in the Ille-et-Vilaine department of Brittany in northwestern France.

== Population ==
Inhabitants of Retiers are called restériens in French.

Historical population
Year	Pop.	±% p.a.
1968	3,153	—
1975	3,331	+0.79%
1982	3,431	+0.42%
1990	3,306	−0.46%
1999	3,212	−0.32%
2007	3,575	+1.35%
2012	3,982	+2.18%
2017	4,357	+1.82%
2023	4,566	+0.78%
Source: INSEE

== See also ==
- Communes of the Ille-et-Vilaine department
