= Martigné-Ferchaud =

Martigné-Ferchaud Marteinyaé-Fèrchaud (Gallo) Marzhinieg-Houarnruz (Breton)
- Commune
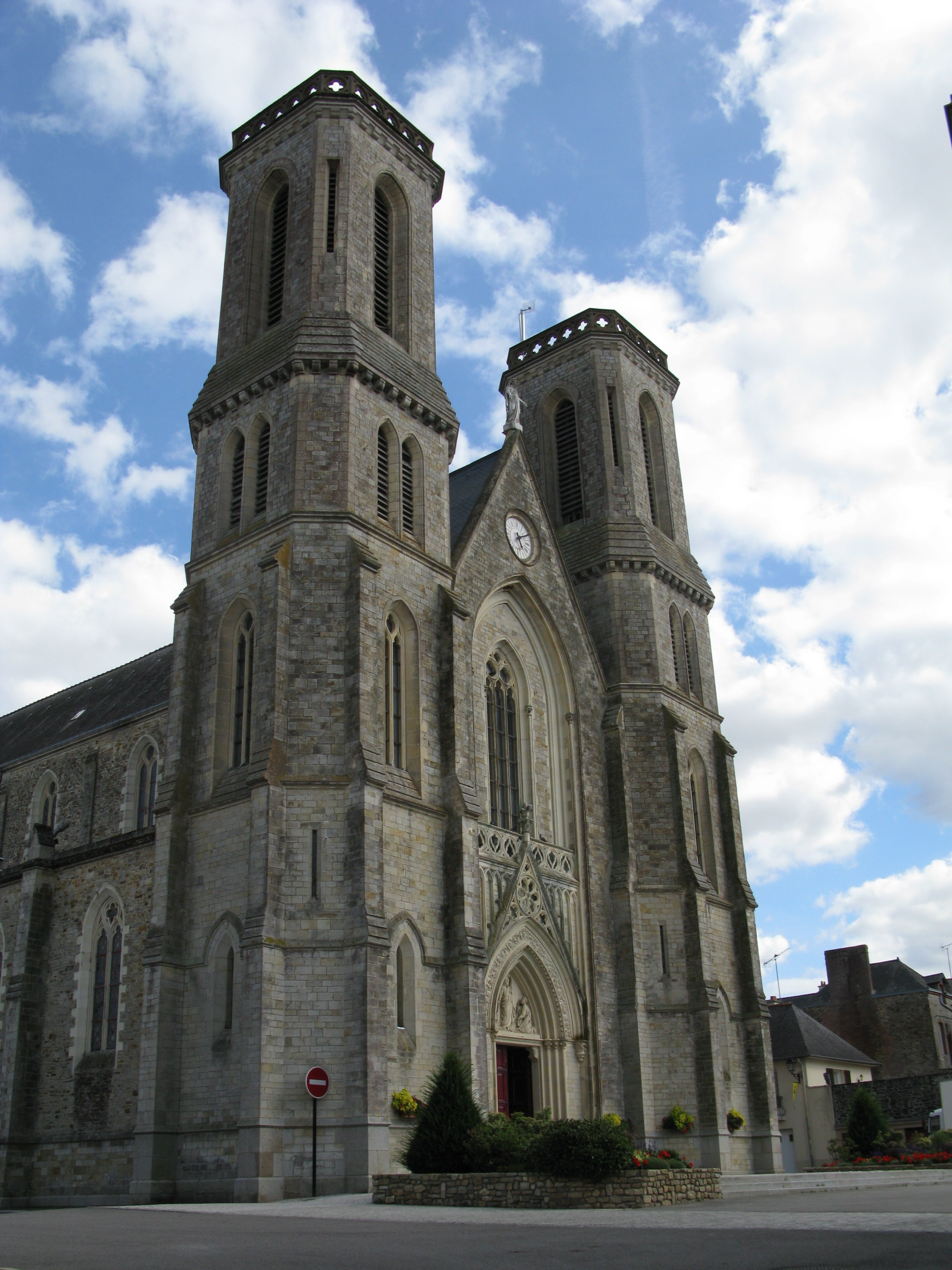
- The church of Saint-Pierre

- Coat of arms
- Location of Martigné-Ferchaud
- Location within France Location within Brittany
- Coordinates: 47°49′43″N 1°19′01″W
- Country: France
- Region: Brittany
- Department: Ille-et-Vilaine
- Arrondissement: Fougères-Vitré
- Canton: La Guerche-de-Bretagne
- Intercommunality: Roche-aux-Fées

Government
  - Mayor (2020–2026): Patrick Henry
- Area^{1}: 74.10 km^{2} (28.61 sq mi)
- Highest elevation: 234 m (768 ft)
- Lowest elevation: 42 m (138 ft)
- Population (2023): 2,688
  - Density: 36.28/km^{2} (93.95/sq mi)
- Time zone: UTC+01:00 (CET)
  - Summer (DST): UTC+02:00 (CEST)
- INSEE/Postal code: 35167 /35640
- ^{1} French Land Register data, which excludes lakes, ponds, glaciers > 1 km^{2} (0.386 sq mi or 247 acres) and river estuaries.

Martigné-Ferchaud (French pronunciation: [maʁtiɲe fɛʁʃo]; Breton: Marzhinieg-Houarnruz; Gallo: Marteinyaé-Fèrchaud) is a commune in the Ille-et-Vilaine department of Brittany in northwestern France.

== Etymology ==
The name "Martigné" is thought to date from the Gallo-Roman period, the place being named after the first Roman governor of the area, known to have been named Martinus. The place-name was recorded in 1218 as Martigneum. The origin of the second part of the name is less clear. In French fer chaud means hot iron, and the two most likely origins are the practice of shoeing horses with hot iron and the local iron working industry.

== Geography ==
The town lies in the middle of the commune, on the left bank of the River Semnon, which flows westwards through the commune.

== History ==
In ancient times the town was part of the Riedones, one of the five Breton federations. Following the Roman invasion of 56 BC, it became part of the Province of Lyonnaise, under Governor Martinus.

Situated on the Roman road from Angers to Rennes, it was a main crossing point on the Semnon. It is believed to have had a small Roman garrison due to its strategic position as a river crossing and as a centre for arms manufacture. The Roman legions withdrew from Gaul in 410AD.

During the feudal period, justice was administered by the local lord, who was required to give service to his sovereign. The service required of the lord of Martigné Ferchaud was two horsemen fully equipped, while that of Vitre was five men-at-arms.

The lord of Martigne had the right of High Justice, including capital crime. Martigné Ferchaud was one of the larger country towns in the region and was subject to the barony of Vitre. The title became associated by marriage with that of Chateaubriant in the 11th century.

Though predominantly an area of agriculture, metal smelting and working continued in Martigné from Roman times until the early 20th century.

== Population ==
Inhabitants of Martigné-Ferchaud are called Martignolais in French.

Historical population
Year	Pop.	±% p.a.
1968	3,227	—
1975	3,285	+0.25%
1982	3,150	−0.60%
1990	2,920	−0.94%
1999	2,634	−1.14%
2007	2,598	−0.17%
2012	2,627	+0.22%
2017	2,603	−0.18%
2023	2,688	+0.54%
Source: INSEE

== See also ==
- Communes of the Ille-et-Vilaine department
