= Argentré-du-Plessis =

Argentré-du-Plessis Arjantrae (Gallo) Argantred-ar-Genkiz (Breton)
- Commune
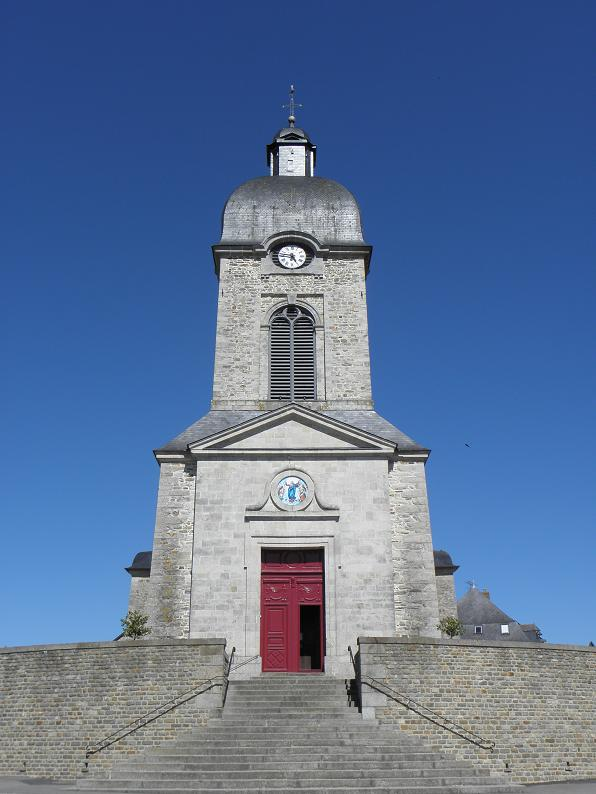
- Église Notre-Dame-de-l'Assomption

- Coat of arms
- Location of Argentré-du-Plessis
- Location within France Location within Brittany
- Coordinates: 48°03′29″N 1°09′10″W
- Country: France
- Region: Brittany
- Department: Ille-et-Vilaine
- Arrondissement: Fougères-Vitré
- Canton: La Guerche-de-Bretagne
- Intercommunality: CA Vitré Communauté

Government
  - Mayor (2020–2026): Jean-Noël Bévière
- Area^{1}: 41.46 km^{2} (16.01 sq mi)
- Elevation: 89 m (292 ft)
- Highest elevation: 163 m (535 ft)
- Lowest elevation: 67 m (220 ft)
- Population (2023): 4,633
  - Density: 111.7/km^{2} (289.4/sq mi)
- Time zone: UTC+01:00 (CET)
  - Summer (DST): UTC+02:00 (CEST)
- INSEE/Postal code: 35006 /35370
- ^{1} French Land Register data, which excludes lakes, ponds, glaciers > 1 km^{2} (0.386 sq mi or 247 acres) and river estuaries.

Argentré-du-Plessis (French: [aʁʒɑ̃tʁe dy plɛsi]; Breton: Argantred-ar-Genkiz; Gallo: Arjantrae) is a commune in the Ille-et-Vilaine department in Brittany in northwestern France.

== Population ==
Historical population
Year	Pop.	±% p.a.
1968	2,422	—
1975	2,765	+1.91%
1982	3,045	+1.39%
1990	3,329	+1.12%
1999	3,614	+0.92%
2007	4,080	+1.53%
2012	4,253	+0.83%
2017	4,396	+0.66%
2023	4,633	+0.88%
Source: INSEE

Inhabitants of Argentré-du-Plessis are called Argentréens in French.

== Sights ==
The Château du Plessis is a local chateau with some vestiges of 16th-century construction, although it was largely rebuilt in the 19th century.

The church of Notre-Dame was built between 1775 and 1779.

The archaeological excavation at Bois du Pinel has uncovered fortifications dating from the 11th century, including a moat, two courtyards, and two enclosures.

== See also ==
- Communes of the Ille-et-Vilaine department
