= Le Theil-de-Bretagne =

Le Theil-de-Bretagne Le Teilh (Gallo) An Tilh (Breton)
- Commune
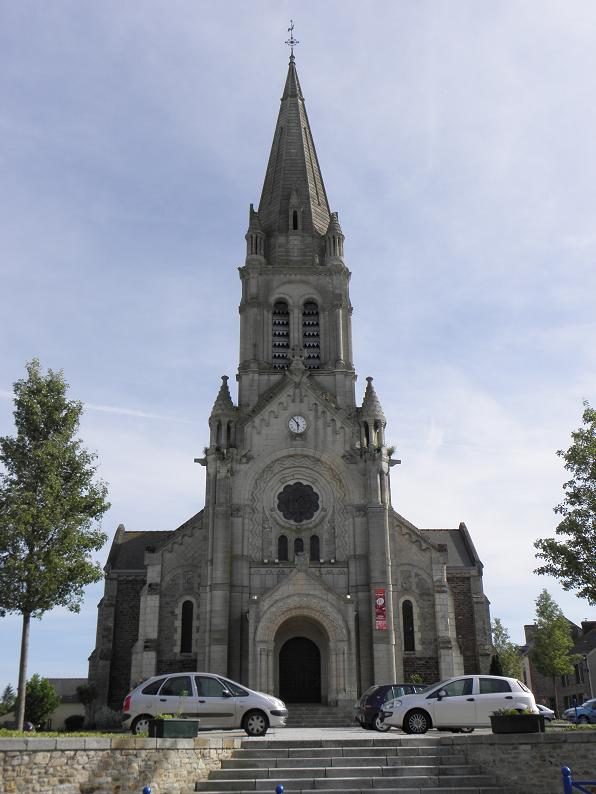
- The church in Le Theil-de-Bretagne
- Location of Le Theil-de-Bretagne
- Location within France Location within Brittany
- Coordinates: 47°55′13″N 1°25′43″W
- Country: France
- Region: Brittany
- Department: Ille-et-Vilaine
- Arrondissement: Fougères-Vitré
- Canton: La Guerche-de-Bretagne
- Intercommunality: Roche-aux-Fées

Government
  - Mayor (2020–2026): Benoît Clément
- Area^{1}: 24.20 km^{2} (9.34 sq mi)
- Highest elevation: 106 m (348 ft)
- Lowest elevation: 42 m (138 ft)
- Population (2023): 1,731
  - Density: 71.53/km^{2} (185.3/sq mi)
- Time zone: UTC+01:00 (CET)
  - Summer (DST): UTC+02:00 (CEST)
- INSEE/Postal code: 35333 /35240
- ^{1} French Land Register data, which excludes lakes, ponds, glaciers > 1 km^{2} (0.386 sq mi or 247 acres) and river estuaries.

Le Theil-de-Bretagne (French pronunciation: [lə tɛj də bʁətaɲ], literally Le Theil of Brittany; Gallo: Le Teilh, Breton: An Tilh) is a commune in the Ille-et-Vilaine department in Brittany in northwestern France.

== Population ==
Inhabitants of Le Theil-de-Bretagne are called Theillais in French.

Historical population
Year	Pop.	±% p.a.
1968	1,016	—
1975	1,089	+1.00%
1982	1,133	+0.57%
1990	1,123	−0.11%
1999	1,130	+0.07%
2007	1,489	+3.51%
2012	1,659	+2.19%
2017	1,734	+0.89%
2023	1,731	−0.03%
Source: INSEE

== See also ==
- Communes of the Ille-et-Vilaine department
