= Canton of La Guerche-de-Bretagne =

Coordinates: 47.94°N 1.23°W

- Canton
- Country: France
- Region: Brittany
- Department: Ille-et-Vilaine
- No. of communes: {{{nbcomm}}}
- Population (2023): 42,779
- INSEE code: 35 10

The canton of La Guerche-de-Bretagne is an administrative division of the Ille-et-Vilaine department, in northwestern France. At the French canton reorganisation which came into effect in March 2015, it was expanded from 12 to 31 communes. Its seat is in La Guerche-de-Bretagne.

It consists of the following communes:

1. Arbrissel
2. Argentré-du-Plessis
3. Availles-sur-Seiche
4. Bais
5. Brielles
6. Chelun
7. Coësmes
8. Domalain
9. Drouges
10. Eancé
11. Essé
12. Étrelles
13. Forges-la-Forêt
14. Gennes-sur-Seiche
15. La Guerche-de-Bretagne
16. Marcillé-Robert
17. Martigné-Ferchaud
18. Moulins
19. Moussé
20. Moutiers
21. Le Pertre
22. Rannée
23. Retiers
24. Saint-Germain-du-Pinel
25. Sainte-Colombe
26. La Selle-Guerchaise
27. Le Theil-de-Bretagne
28. Thourie
29. Torcé
30. Vergéal
31. Visseiche
