= Noyal-sur-Vilaine =

Noyal-sur-Vilaine Noyal/Nouyal (Gallo) Noal-ar-Gwilen (Breton)
- Commune
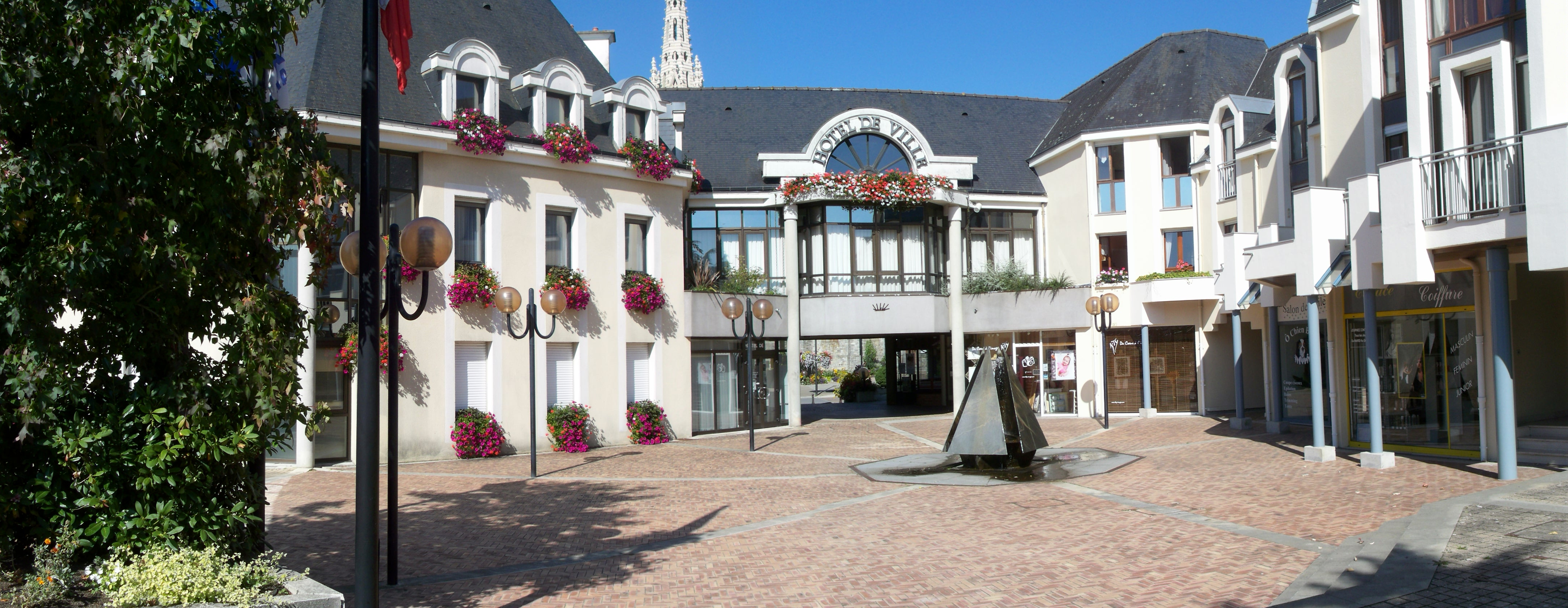
- The town hall of Noyal-sur-Vilaine

- Coat of arms
- Location of Noyal-sur-Vilaine
- Location within France Location within Brittany
- Coordinates: 48°06′45″N 1°31′24″W
- Country: France
- Region: Brittany
- Department: Ille-et-Vilaine
- Arrondissement: Rennes
- Canton: Châteaugiron
- Intercommunality: Pays de Châteaugiron

Government
  - Mayor (2020–2026): Marielle Muret-Baudoin
- Area^{1}: 30.72 km^{2} (11.86 sq mi)
- Highest elevation: 91 m (299 ft)
- Lowest elevation: 32 m (105 ft)
- Population (2023): 6,269
  - Density: 204.1/km^{2} (528.5/sq mi)
- Time zone: UTC+01:00 (CET)
  - Summer (DST): UTC+02:00 (CEST)
- INSEE/Postal code: 35207 /35530
- ^{1} French Land Register data, which excludes lakes, ponds, glaciers > 1 km^{2} (0.386 sq mi or 247 acres) and river estuaries.

Noyal-sur-Vilaine (French pronunciation: [nwajal syʁ vilɛn]; Gallo: Noyal or Nouyal, Breton: Noal-ar-Gwilen) is a commune in the Ille-et-Vilaine department of Brittany in northwestern France.

== Geography ==
Noyal is some ten kilometres east of Rennes.

Adjacent communes:

- Acigné,
- Brécé,
- Cesson-Sévigné,
- Domloup,
- Châteaugiron,
- Servon-sur-Vilaine,
- Ossé,
- Domagné.

== Population ==
Inhabitants of Noyal-sur-Vilaine are called noyalais in French.

Historical population

Year	Pop.	±% p.a.
1836	3,004	—
1891	2,539	−0.31%
1921	2,114	−0.61%
1962	2,188	+0.08%
1968	2,518	+2.37%
1975	2,953	+2.30%
1982	3,835	+3.80%

Year	Pop.	±% p.a.
1990	4,091	+0.81%
1999	4,705	+1.57%
2007	5,012	+0.79%
2012	5,526	+1.97%
2017	6,008	+1.69%
2023	6,269	+0.71%

Source: EHESS and INSEE (1968-2023)

== See also ==
- Communes of the Ille-et-Vilaine department
