= Piré-sur-Seiche =

Piré-sur-Seiche Pereg
- Part of Piré-Chancé
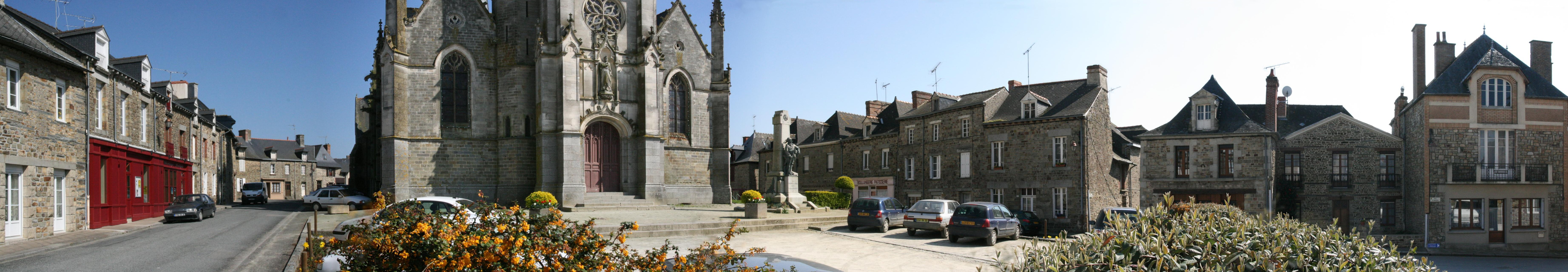
- Town square

- Coat of arms
- Location of Piré-sur-Seiche
- Location within France Location within Brittany
- Coordinates: 48°00′37″N 1°25′45″W
- Country: France
- Region: Brittany
- Department: Ille-et-Vilaine
- Arrondissement: Rennes
- Canton: Châteaugiron
- Commune: Piré-Chancé
- Area^{1}: 36.34 km^{2} (14.03 sq mi)
- Highest elevation: 86 m (282 ft)
- Lowest elevation: 31 m (102 ft)
- Population (2022): 2,855
  - Density: 78.56/km^{2} (203.5/sq mi)
- Time zone: UTC+01:00 (CET)
  - Summer (DST): UTC+02:00 (CEST)
- Postal code: 35150
- ^{1} French Land Register data, which excludes lakes, ponds, glaciers > 1 km^{2} (0.386 sq mi or 247 acres) and river estuaries.

Piré-sur-Seiche (French pronunciation: [piʁe syʁ sɛʃ]; Breton: Pereg) is a former commune in the Ille-et-Vilaine department of Brittany in northwestern France. On 1 January 2019, it was merged into the new commune Piré-Chancé.

== Population ==
People from Piré-sur-Seiche are called Piréens in French.

Historical population
Year	Pop.	±% p.a.
1962	2,005	—
1968	1,950	−0.46%
1975	1,743	−1.59%
1982	1,809	+0.53%
1990	1,730	−0.56%
1999	1,877	+0.91%
2006	2,030	+1.13%
2022	2,855	+2.15%
Source: EHESS and INSEE

== Personalities ==
- Léon Letort, pioneer French aviator

== See also ==
- Communes of the Ille-et-Vilaine department
