= Chancé =

Commune in Ille-et-Vilaine, France

Chancé Kantieg
- Part of Piré-Chancé
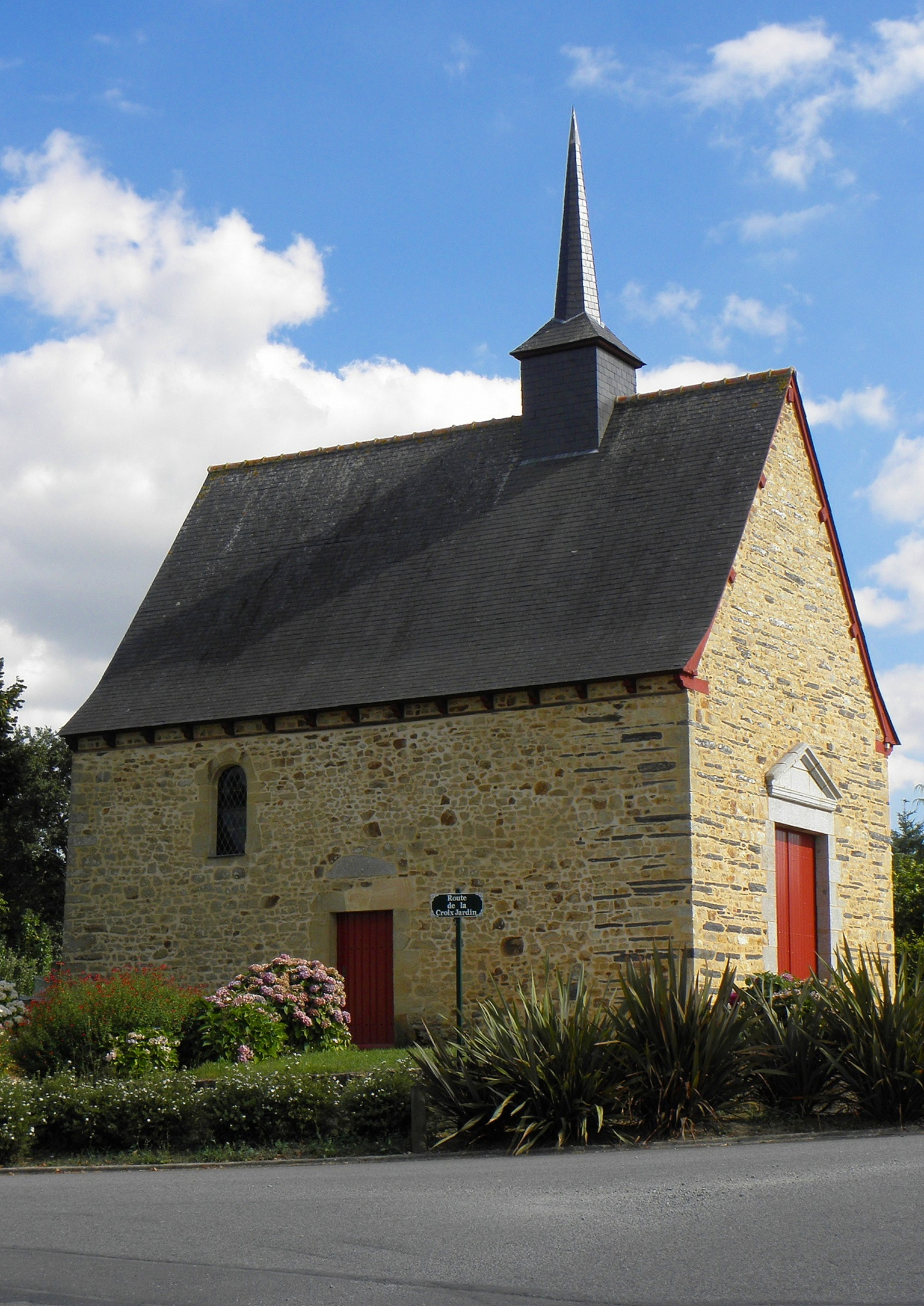
- The chapel of Saint-Marc and Saint-Marcoul
- Location of Chancé
- Location within France Location within Brittany
- Coordinates: 48°02′12″N 1°22′44″W
- Country: France
- Region: Brittany
- Department: Ille-et-Vilaine
- Arrondissement: Rennes
- Canton: Châteaugiron
- Commune: Piré-Chancé
- Area^{1}: 5.22 km^{2} (2.02 sq mi)
- Highest elevation: 89 m (292 ft)
- Lowest elevation: 50 m (160 ft)
- Population (2023): 327
  - Density: 62.6/km^{2} (162/sq mi)
- Time zone: UTC+01:00 (CET)
  - Summer (DST): UTC+02:00 (CEST)
- Postal code: 35680
- ^{1} French Land Register data, which excludes lakes, ponds, glaciers > 1 km^{2} (0.386 sq mi or 247 acres) and river estuaries.

Chancé (French pronunciation: [ʃɑ̃se]; Breton: Kantieg) is a former commune in the Ille-et-Vilaine department in Brittany in northwestern France. On 1 January 2019, it was merged into the new commune Piré-Chancé. Inhabitants of Chancé are called Chancéens in French.

== See also ==
- Communes of the Ille-et-Vilaine department
