= Saint-Aubin-du-Pavail =

Saint-Aubin-du-Pavail Sant-Albin-ar-Pavez
- Part of Châteaugiron
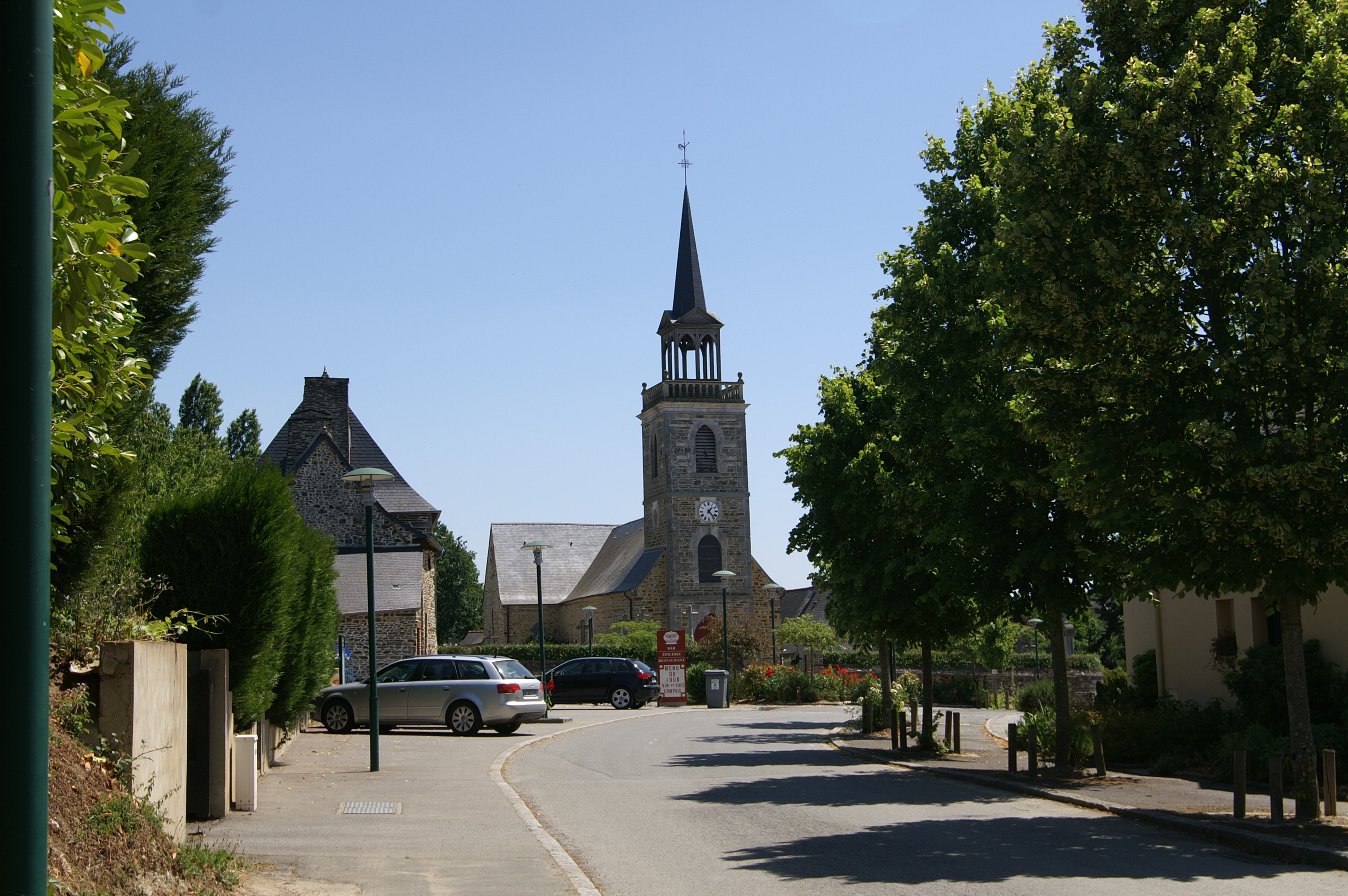
- The centre of Saint-Aubin-du-Pavail
- Location of Saint-Aubin-du-Pavail
- Location within France Location within Brittany
- Coordinates: 48°02′40″N 1°27′37″W
- Country: France
- Region: Brittany
- Department: Ille-et-Vilaine
- Arrondissement: Rennes
- Canton: Châteaugiron
- Commune: Châteaugiron
- Area^{1}: 5.83 km^{2} (2.25 sq mi)
- Elevation: 57 m (187 ft)
- Highest elevation: 76 m (249 ft)
- Lowest elevation: 50 m (160 ft)
- Population (2022): 894
  - Density: 153/km^{2} (397/sq mi)
- Time zone: UTC+01:00 (CET)
  - Summer (DST): UTC+02:00 (CEST)
- Postal code: 35410
- ^{1} French Land Register data, which excludes lakes, ponds, glaciers > 1 km^{2} (0.386 sq mi or 247 acres) and river estuaries.

Saint-Aubin-du-Pavail (French pronunciation: [sɛ̃.t‿obɛ̃ dy pavaj]; Breton: Sant-Albin-ar-Pavez) is a former commune in the Ille-et-Vilaine department in Brittany in northwestern France. On 1 January 2017, it was merged into the commune Châteaugiron.

The name Saint-Aubin-du-Pavail comes from Saint Aubin, bishop of Angers in the 6th century. The term "Pavail" indicates the paving stone of the Gallo-Roman way which crossed the commune. Inhabitants of Saint-Aubin-du-Pavail are called saint-aubinais in French.

== History ==
The church of Saint-Aubin-du-Pavail is mentioned for the first time in the mid-11th century: Brient, seigneurs of Chateaubriant, gave the tithe church of Saint-Aubin to the Abbey of Marmoutier, at the time of the foundation of the priory of Béré. The donation was confirmed in 1217, but the parish of Saint-Aubin-du-Pavail is in reality attested only since 1245. It depended formerly on the old bishopric of Rennes. The seigneurie of Saint-Aubin-of-Pavail was the concern of the barony of Châteaugiron. It passes by alliance at the end of 15th century to the lords of Boisorcan, who linked it with their châtellenie in 1583.

== Sights ==
- The church of Saint-Aubin (12th-16th-17th-18th-19th centuries). The two chapels forming the transept were built in the north and the south of the building in respectively the 16th century and in 1607. The nave which shows the dates to be 1607 and 1620 was lengthened in 1853. Two sacristies were built in 1863 and 1864. The bell dates back to 1732. The baptismal font goes back to 1855
- several wayside crosses
- the old presbytery (1884–1885)
- Gallo-Roman remains are found in the hamlets Le Gacel, Tébry, Tayée and L'Aubriais
- the old manor of Saint-Aubin-du-Pavail. Successive property of the Saint-Aubin (in 1427), Pontrouault (in 1478), Thierry (about 1513), Angennes (about 1583), Morais (in 1682 and 1718), Martigné (in 1734) families
- the old manor of Touches-Fouquet. Property of the family of Châteaugiron (in 1427 and 1513) and of the Déélin family (in 1660)
- the old manor of Mardeaux

== See also ==
- Communes of the Ille-et-Vilaine department
