= Boistrudan =

Boistrudan Boéz-Trudan (Gallo) Koetruzan (Breton)
- Commune
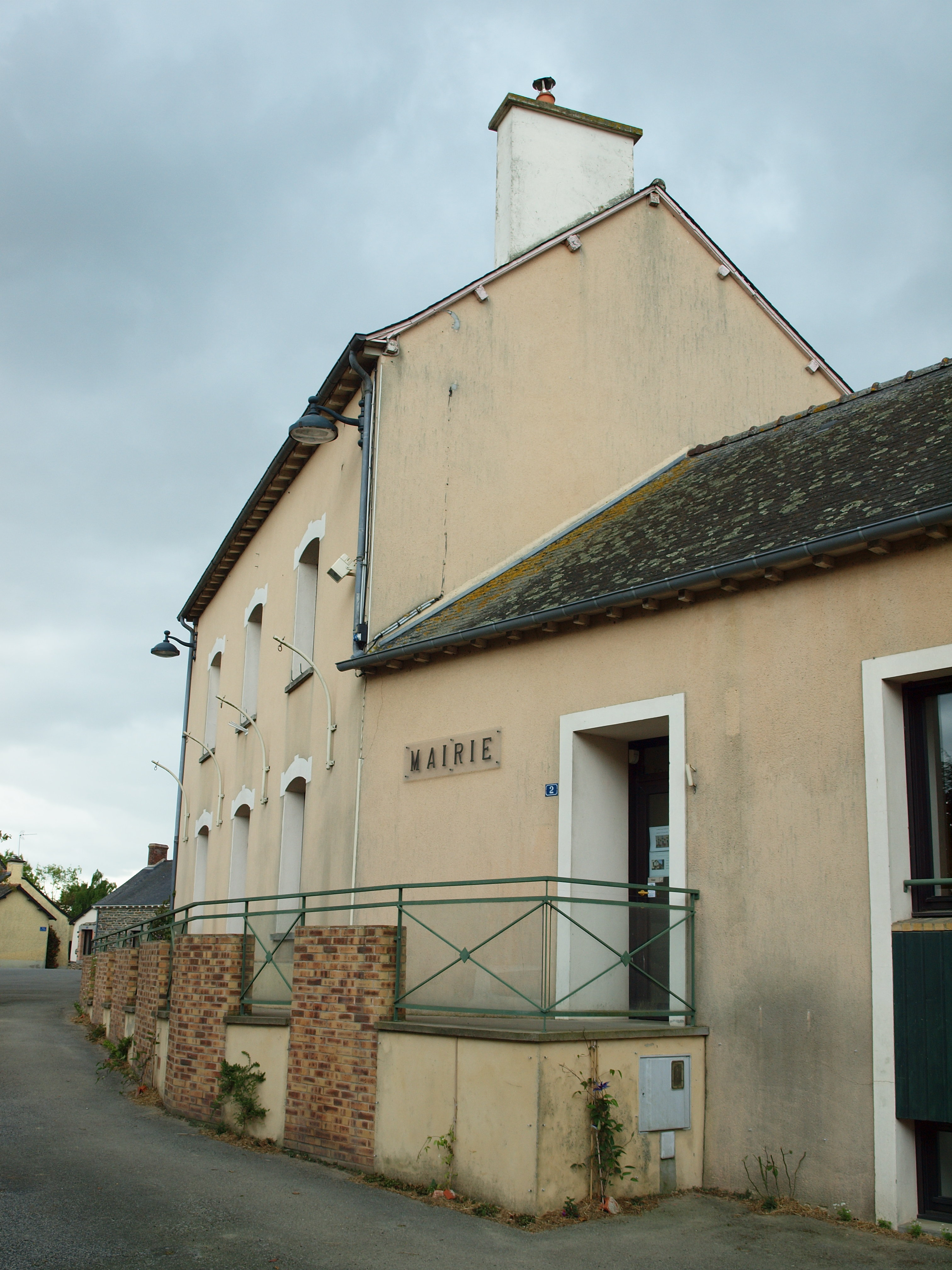
- The town hall of Boistrudan
- Location of Boistrudan
- Location within France Location within Brittany
- Coordinates: 47°58′13″N 1°23′59″W
- Country: France
- Region: Brittany
- Department: Ille-et-Vilaine
- Arrondissement: Fougères-Vitré
- Canton: Châteaugiron
- Intercommunality: Roche-aux-Fées

Government
  - Mayor (2020–2026): Anne Renault
- Area^{1}: 12.80 km^{2} (4.94 sq mi)
- Highest elevation: 85 m (279 ft)
- Lowest elevation: 32 m (105 ft)
- Population (2023): 728
  - Density: 56.9/km^{2} (147/sq mi)
- Time zone: UTC+01:00 (CET)
  - Summer (DST): UTC+02:00 (CEST)
- INSEE/Postal code: 35028 /35150
- ^{1} French Land Register data, which excludes lakes, ponds, glaciers > 1 km^{2} (0.386 sq mi or 247 acres) and river estuaries.

Boistrudan (French pronunciation: [bwatʁydɑ̃]; Breton: Koetruzan; Gallo: Boéz-Trudan) is a commune in the Ille-et-Vilaine department in Brittany in northwestern France.

== Population ==
Historical population
Year	Pop.	±% p.a.
1968	576	—
1975	505	−1.86%
1982	475	−0.87%
1990	501	+0.67%
1999	494	−0.16%
2007	665	+3.79%
2012	661	−0.12%
2017	710	+1.44%
2023	728	+0.42%
Source: INSEE

Inhabitants of Boistrudan are called Boistrudanais in French.

== Toponymy ==
Bosco Truant in 1197, Boays-Trudant in the 16th century, then Bois-Trudain in 1685, Bois-trudaine around 1780.

Meaning : Truant's wood, Truant can be a surname or the common word for "beggar, tramp" in Old French.

== See also ==
- Communes of the Ille-et-Vilaine department
