= Ossé =

Ossé Oc'heg
- Part of Châteaugiron
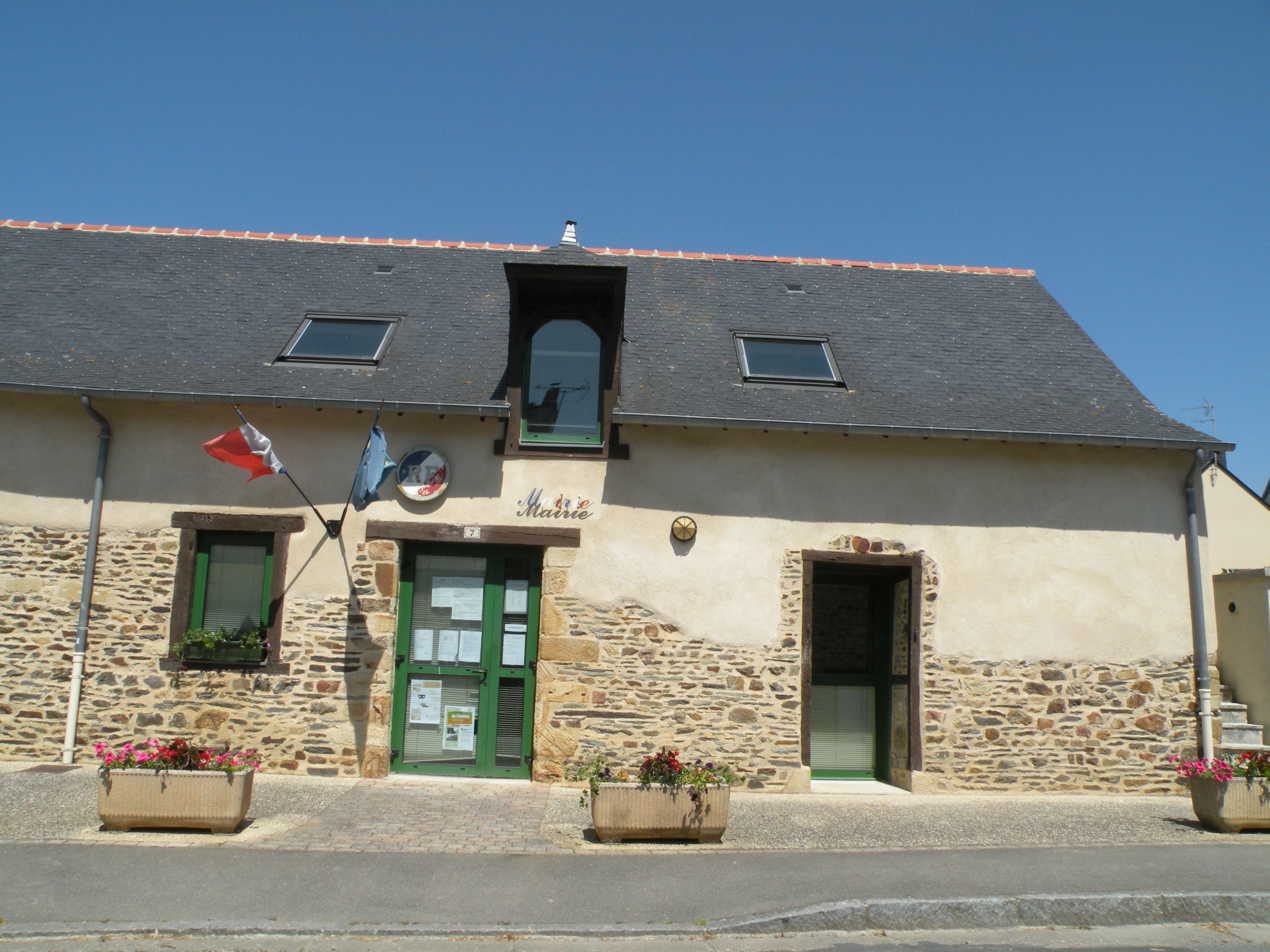
- The town hall of Ossé
- Location of Ossé
- Location within France Location within Brittany
- Coordinates: 48°03′23″N 1°26′54″W
- Country: France
- Region: Brittany
- Department: Ille-et-Vilaine
- Arrondissement: Fougères-Vitré
- Canton: Châteaugiron
- Commune: Châteaugiron
- Area^{1}: 8.99 km^{2} (3.47 sq mi)
- Highest elevation: 78 m (256 ft)
- Lowest elevation: 44 m (144 ft)
- Population (2022): 1,438
  - Density: 160/km^{2} (414/sq mi)
- Time zone: UTC+01:00 (CET)
  - Summer (DST): UTC+02:00 (CEST)
- Postal code: 35410
- ^{1} French Land Register data, which excludes lakes, ponds, glaciers > 1 km^{2} (0.386 sq mi or 247 acres) and river estuaries.

Ossé (French pronunciation: [ɔse]; Breton: Oc'heg) is a former commune in the Ille-et-Vilaine department in Brittany in northwestern France. On 1 January 2017, it was merged into the commune Châteaugiron.

== Population ==
Inhabitants of Ossé are called Osséens in French.

Historical population
Year	Pop.	±% p.a.
1962	454	—
1968	442	−0.45%
1975	420	−0.73%
1982	630	+5.96%
1990	705	+1.42%
1999	772	+1.01%
2006	968	+3.28%
2022	1,438	+2.50%
Source: EHESS and INSEE

== See also ==
- Communes of the Ille-et-Vilaine department
