= Piré-Chancé =

Piré-Chancé Pereg-Kantieg (Breton)
- Commune
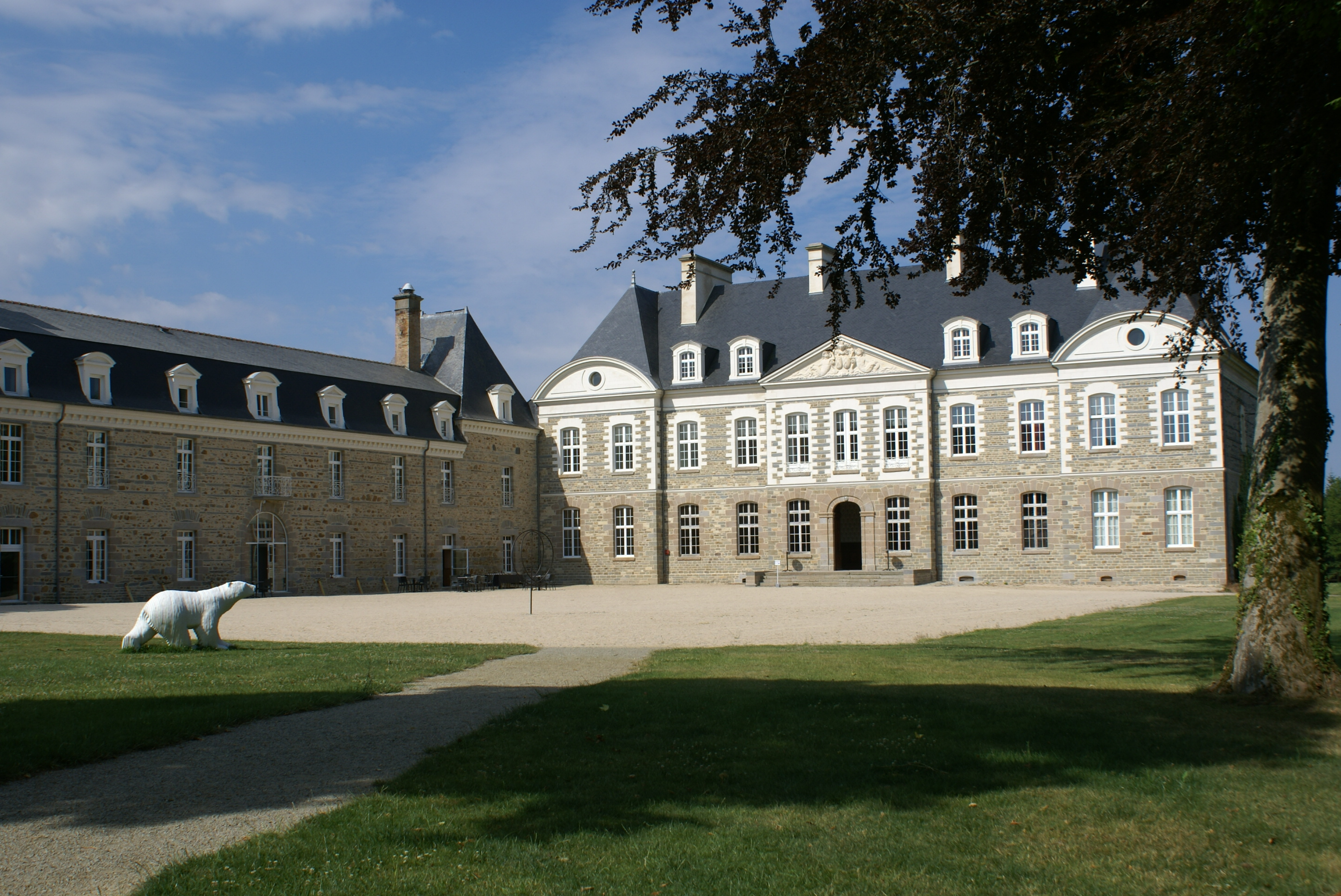
- Façade of the Château des Pères.
- Location of Piré-Chancé
- Location within France Location within Brittany
- Coordinates: 48°00′37″N 1°25′45″W
- Country: France
- Region: Brittany
- Department: Ille-et-Vilaine
- Arrondissement: Rennes
- Canton: Châteaugiron
- Intercommunality: Pays de Châteaugiron

Government
  - Mayor (2020–2026): Dominique Denieul
- Area^{1}: 41.56 km^{2} (16.05 sq mi)
- Highest elevation: 89 m (292 ft)
- Lowest elevation: 31 m (102 ft)
- Population (2023): 3,224
  - Density: 77.57/km^{2} (200.9/sq mi)
- Time zone: UTC+01:00 (CET)
  - Summer (DST): UTC+02:00 (CEST)
- INSEE/Postal code: 35220 /35150
- ^{1} French Land Register data, which excludes lakes, ponds, glaciers > 1 km^{2} (0.386 sq mi or 247 acres) and river estuaries.

Piré-Chancé (French pronunciation: [piʁe ʃɑ̃se]; Breton: Pereg-Kantieg) is a commune in the Ille-et-Vilaine department of Brittany in northwestern France. It was established on 1 January 2019 by merger of the former communes of Piré-sur-Seiche (the seat) and Chancé.

== Population ==
Population data refer to the commune in its geography as of January 2025.

Historical population
Year	Pop.	±% p.a.
1968	2,232	—
1975	1,944	−1.95%
1982	2,006	+0.45%
1990	1,939	−0.42%
1999	2,123	+1.01%
2007	2,423	+1.67%
2012	2,619	+1.57%
2017	2,901	+2.07%
2023	3,224	+1.78%
Source: INSEE

== See also ==
- Communes of the Ille-et-Vilaine department
