= Châteaubourg, Ille-et-Vilaine =

Châteaubourg Chastèu-Bórg (Gallo) Kastell-Bourc'h (Breton)
- Commune
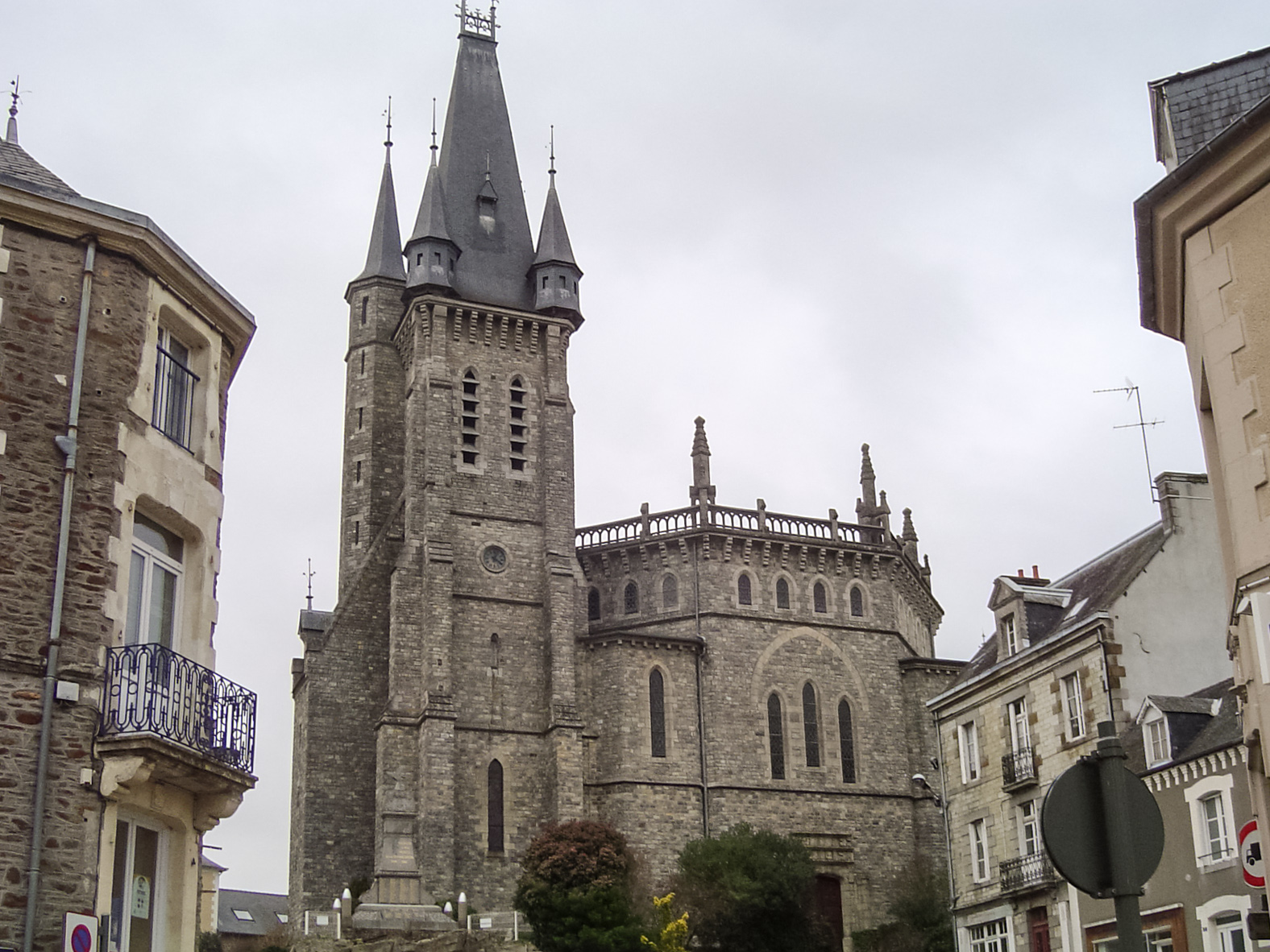
- Saint-Pierre church

- Coat of arms
- Location of Châteaubourg
- Location within France Location within Brittany
- Coordinates: 48°06′43″N 1°24′07″W
- Country: France
- Region: Brittany
- Department: Ille-et-Vilaine
- Arrondissement: Fougères-Vitré
- Canton: Châteaugiron
- Intercommunality: CA Vitré Communauté

Government
  - Mayor (2020–2026): Teddy Régnier
- Area^{1}: 28.60 km^{2} (11.04 sq mi)
- Highest elevation: 117 m (384 ft)
- Lowest elevation: 35 m (115 ft)
- Population (2023): 7,533
  - Density: 263.4/km^{2} (682.2/sq mi)
- Time zone: UTC+01:00 (CET)
  - Summer (DST): UTC+02:00 (CEST)
- INSEE/Postal code: 35068 /35220
- ^{1} French Land Register data, which excludes lakes, ponds, glaciers > 1 km^{2} (0.386 sq mi or 247 acres) and river estuaries.

Châteaubourg (French pronunciation: [ʃatobuʁ]; Breton: Kastell-Bourc'h; Gallo: Chastèu-Bórg) is a commune in the Ille-et-Vilaine department in Brittany in northwestern France.

The commune is listed as a Village étape.

== Population ==
Inhabitants of Châteaubourg are called Castelbourgeois in French.

Historical population
Year	Pop.	±% p.a.
1968	2,634	—
1975	2,937	+1.57%
1982	3,526	+2.65%
1990	4,056	+1.77%
1999	4,877	+2.07%
2007	5,629	+1.81%
2012	6,310	+2.31%
2017	7,064	+2.28%
2023	7,533	+1.08%
Source: INSEE

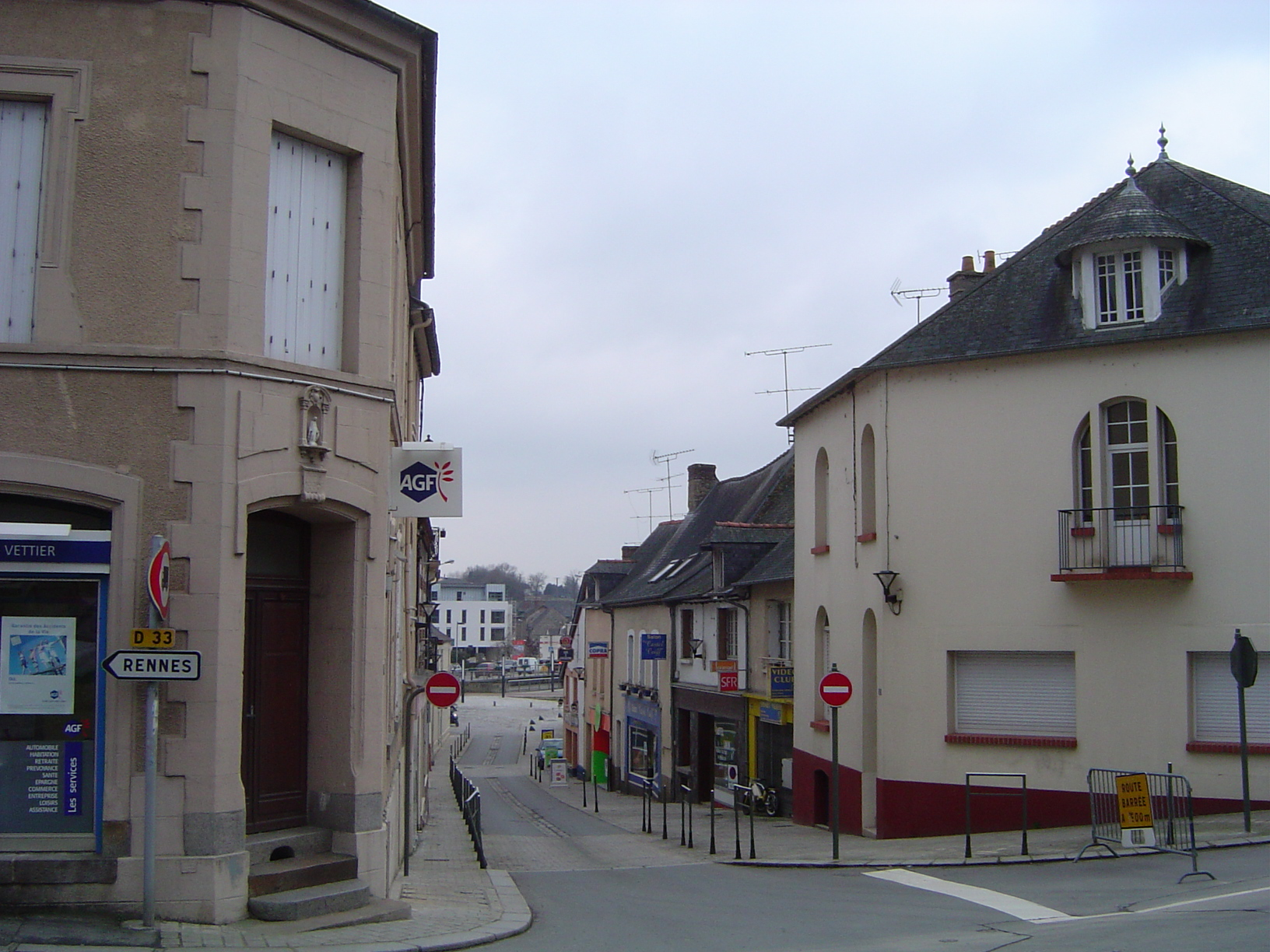
Châteaubourg Inner town

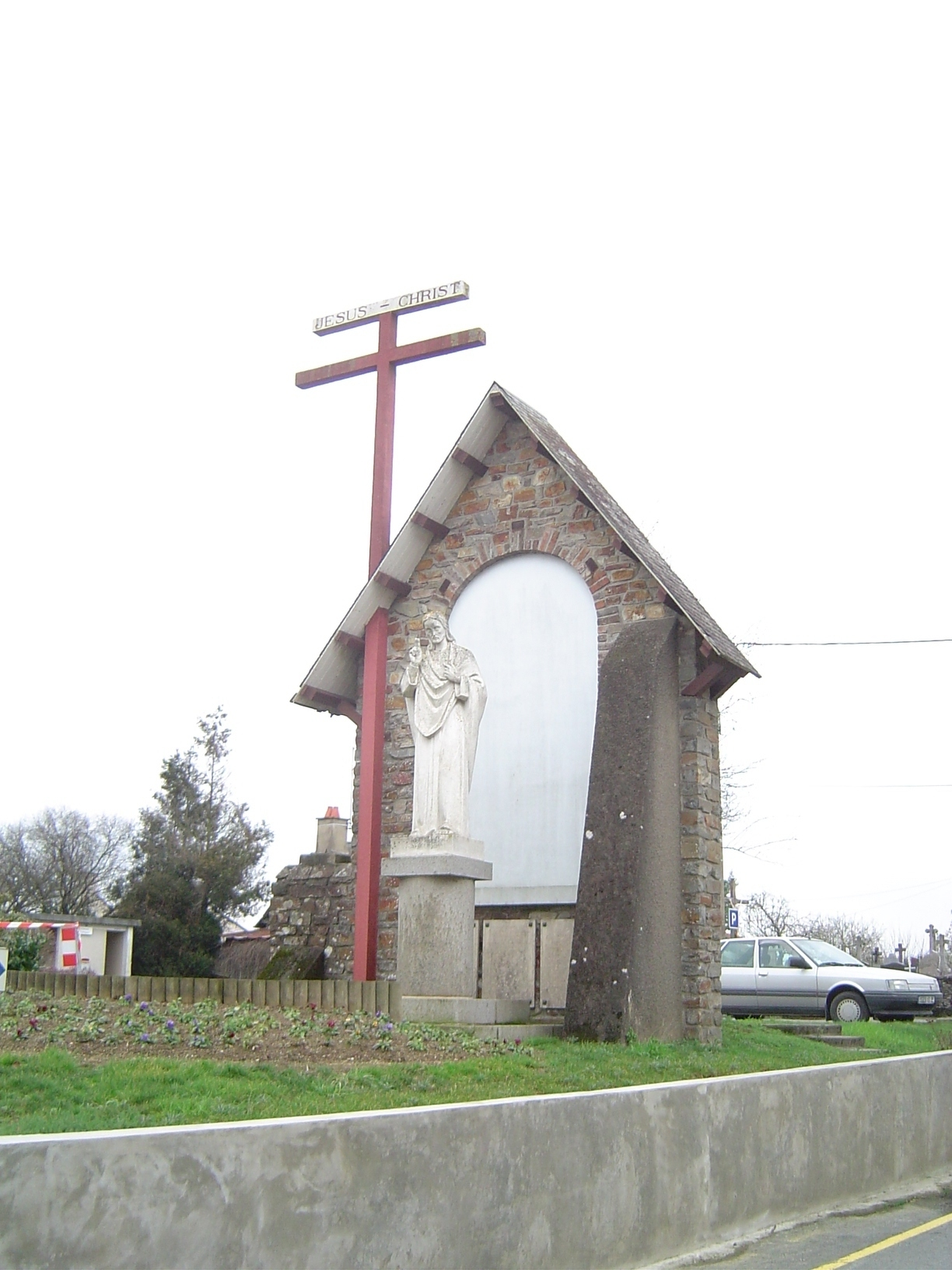
Saint-Melaine calvary

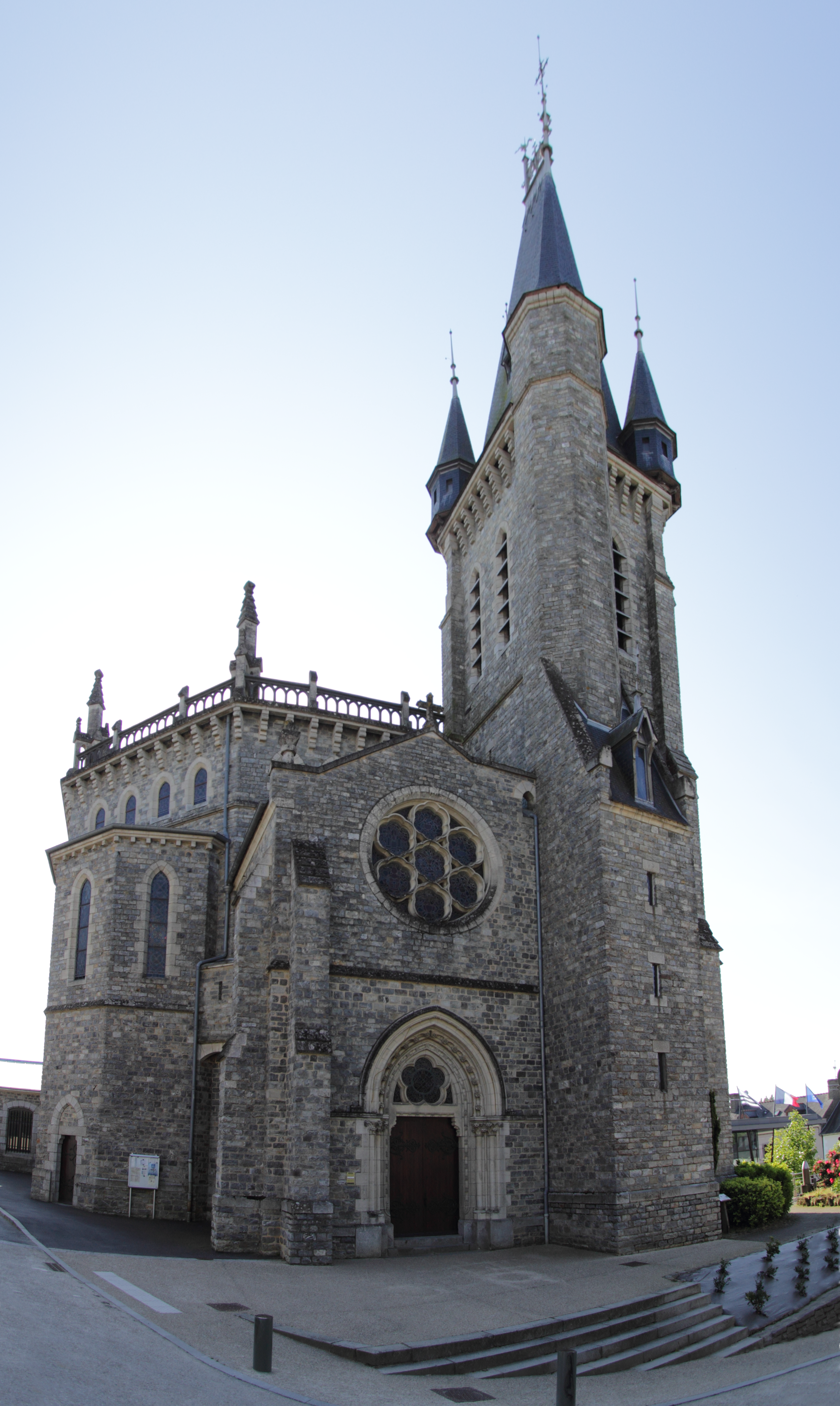
Saint-Pierre church

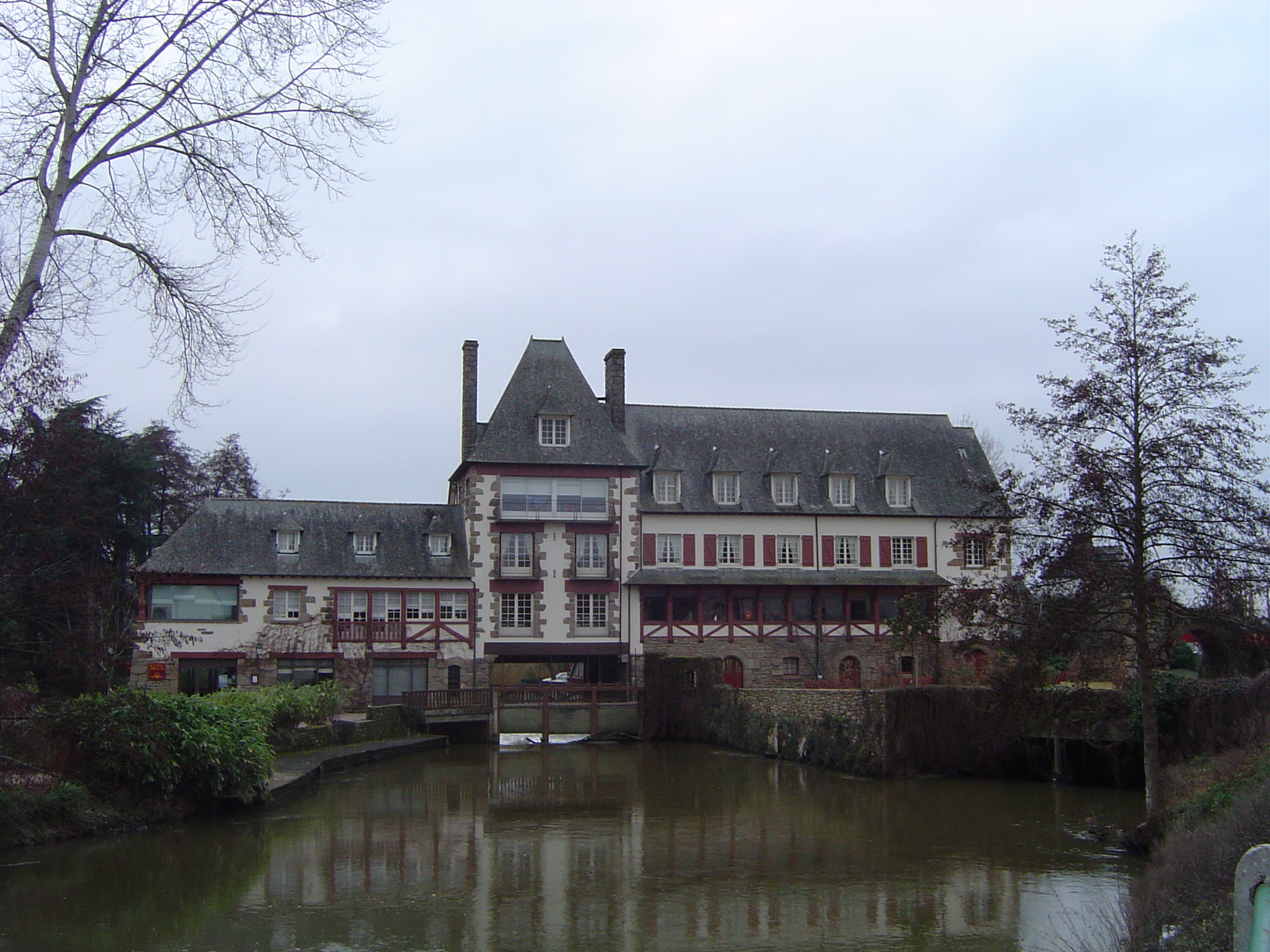
«Ar Milin» stepping over the Vilaine

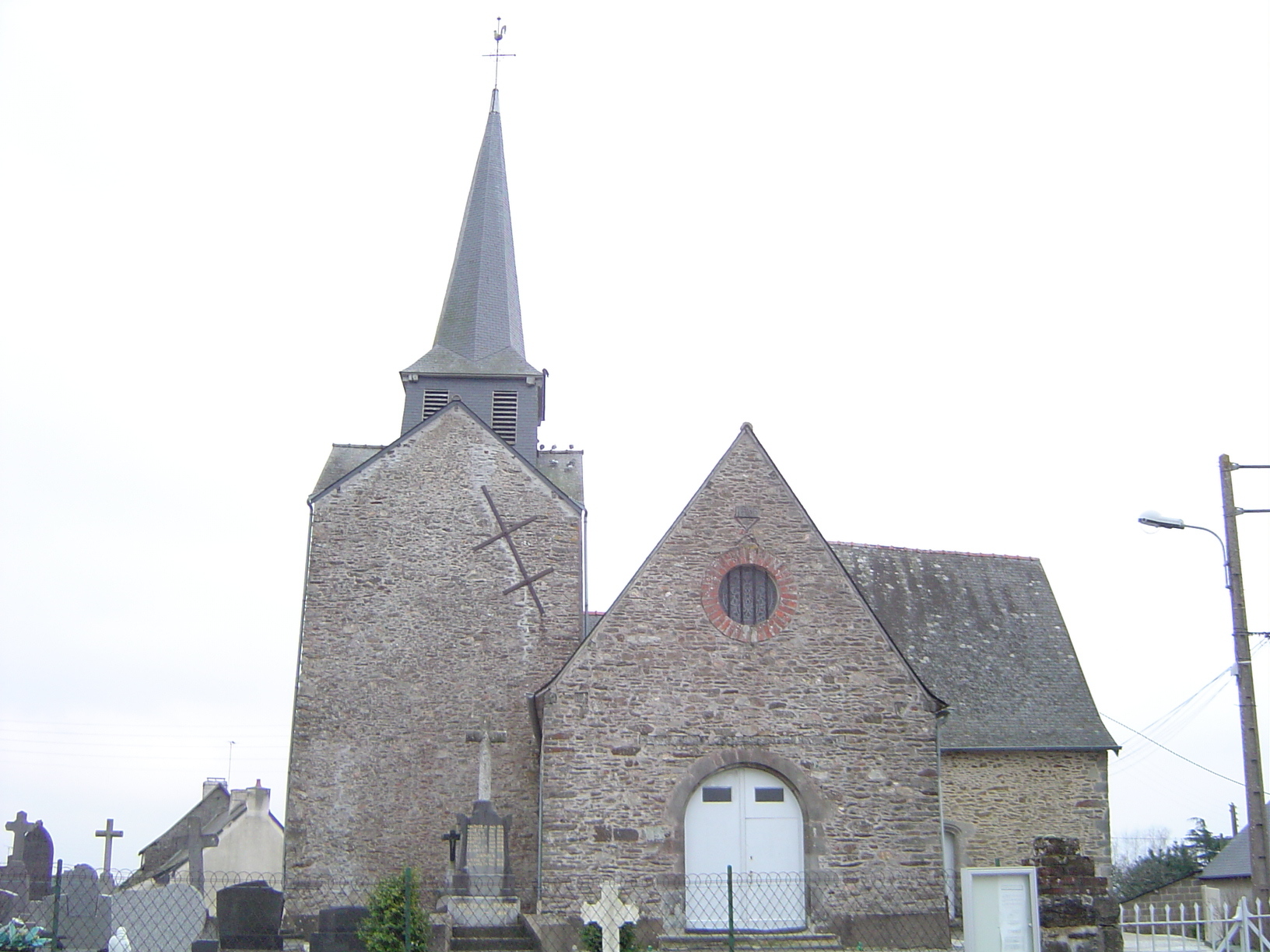
Saint-Melaine church

Old town house

== See also ==
- Communes of the Ille-et-Vilaine department
