= Léon Letort =

French aviator (1889–1913)

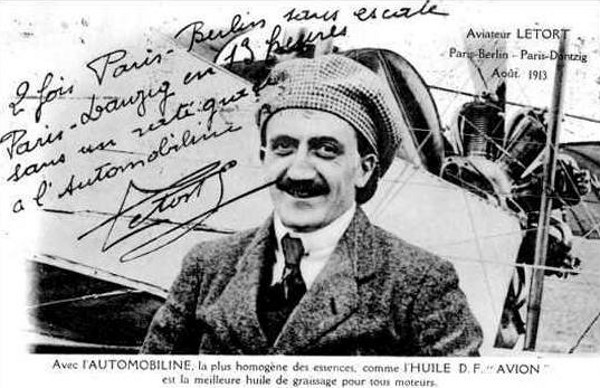
- Léon Letort and his Morane-Saulnier monoplane in 1913, crediting Automobiline Oil for 2 trips to Berlin and one to Danzig
- Born: 18 September 1889; Pire-sur-Seiche
- Died: 10 December 1913 (aged 24); Barbezieux-Saint-Hilaire France
- Occupation: Aircraft pilot
- Known for: Aviation pioneer, in 1913 he set the world record for flying the greatest distance non-stop.

Léon Letort (18 September 1889 – 10 December 1913) was a pioneer French aviator. He gained his pilot's license on 9 August 1910, flew his Blériot in exhibitions across France, and flew on military service in the Balkan Wars. In 1913 he set the world record for the greatest distance travelled non-stop, flying 950 kilometres (590 mi) in 8 hours. He died during an attempt to win a prize for long-distance flight when he crash-landed at Barbezieux-Saint-Hilaire outside Bordeaux.

== Early life ==
Letort was born on 18 September 1889 in Pire-sur-Seiche, Brittany, the youngest of four brothers and four sisters from a wealthy family in the textile business. He was educated in Rennes at the School of Brothers of Christian Instruction at Parc du Thabor and the College of St. Martin. His main interest was in mechanical things, so on leaving school aged 18 he started in the automotive and aviation industry.

== Career ==
Letort worked for Louis Blériot and was awarded pilots licence No. 170 on 9 August 1910. He then completed his military service as an aviator/engineer (fr: sapeur).

On 15 April 1912, he participated in the Easter airshow at Parc des Gayeulles, Rennes, in the Blériot of Louis Kuhling.

After completing his military service, Letort participated in the Balkan Wars in 1912. It being one of the earliest conflicts where air power was used, Letort concentrated on developing his aircraft towards becoming a decisive weapon. After the war he returned to Blériot and was considered one of the safest pilots.

=== Flying exploits ===
On 13 July 1913 Letort flew from Paris to Berlin non-stop, covering 920 km (570 mi) in 9 hours, 47 minutes, breaking the world distance record for a non-stop flight. The Morane-Saulnier monoplane was powered by a Le Rhône 80 hp 7-cylinder rotary engine. On the return journey, started on 23 July, he carried a passenger, the Estonian aviator Ljuba Galantschikoff.

In an attempt to win the Coupe Pommery prize for long-distance flight, he flew 1,300 km (810 mi) from Paris to Danzig, stopping at Berlin, on 23 August 1913. However, he failed to win the prize, which was won by Guilleaux with a flight of 1,386 km (861 mi) made the same day.

== Death and commemoration ==
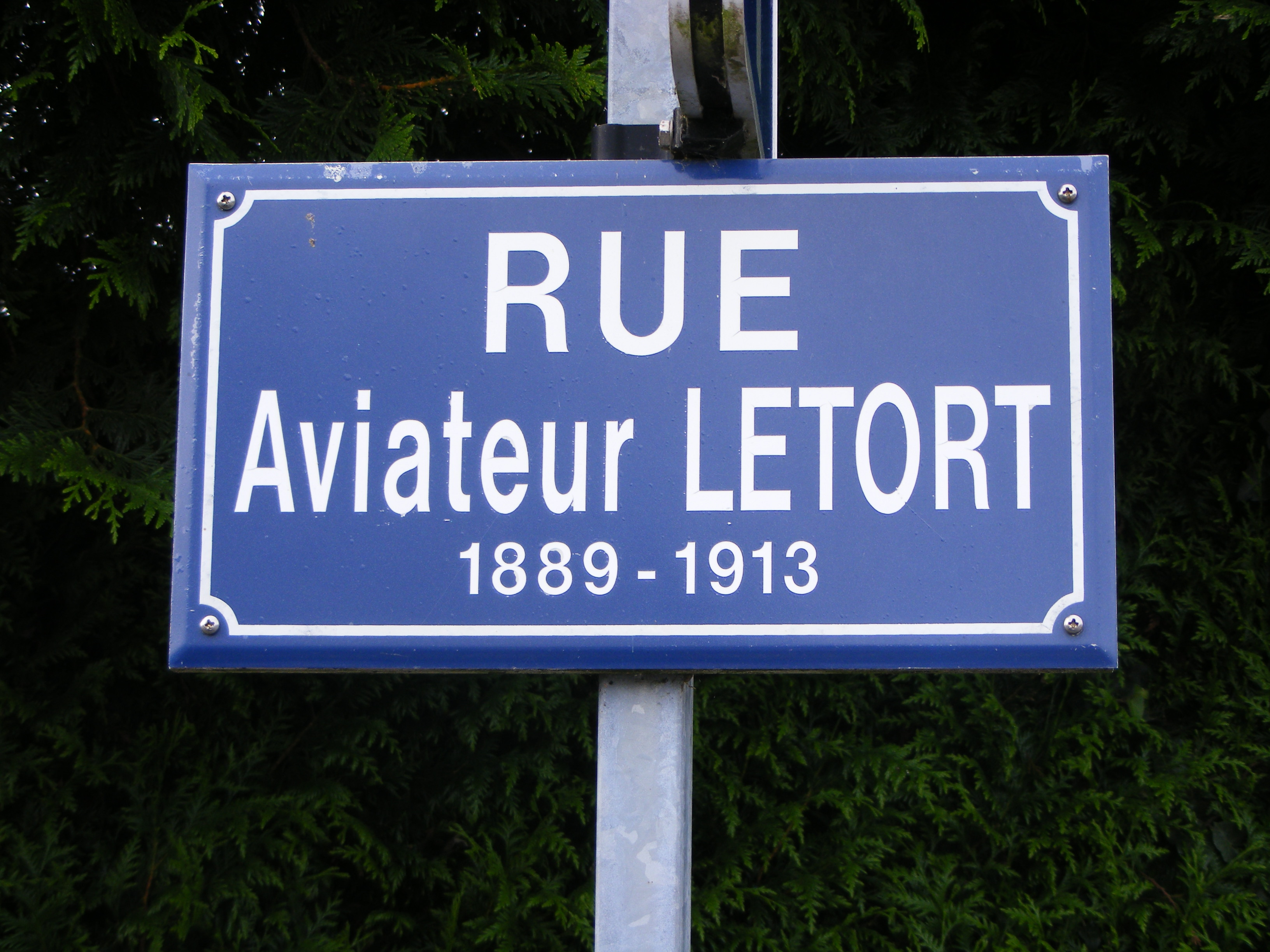
Street Cred - Rue de l'aviateur LETORT à Piré-sur-Seiche

On 10 December 1913 Letort made an attempt to win the Aero Club of France Criterium prize for the longest return flight made during the year, flying a Maurice Farman biplane. After departing from Buc with the intention of flying to Bordeaux and back, he flew 1,050 kilometres (650 mi) until he had to make a forced landing at Barbezieux, during which the aircraft ran into a ditch and overturned. He died on arrival at hospital at Barbezieux. He was buried in Pire-sur-Seiche on 14 December 1913, attended by a large crowd of mourners.

== See also ==
- List of fatalities from aviation accidents
