= Saint-Jean-sur-Vilaine =

Saint-Jean-sur-Vilaine Saent-Jan-sur-Vilaèyn (Gallo) Sant-Yarr-an-Gwilen (Breton)
- Commune
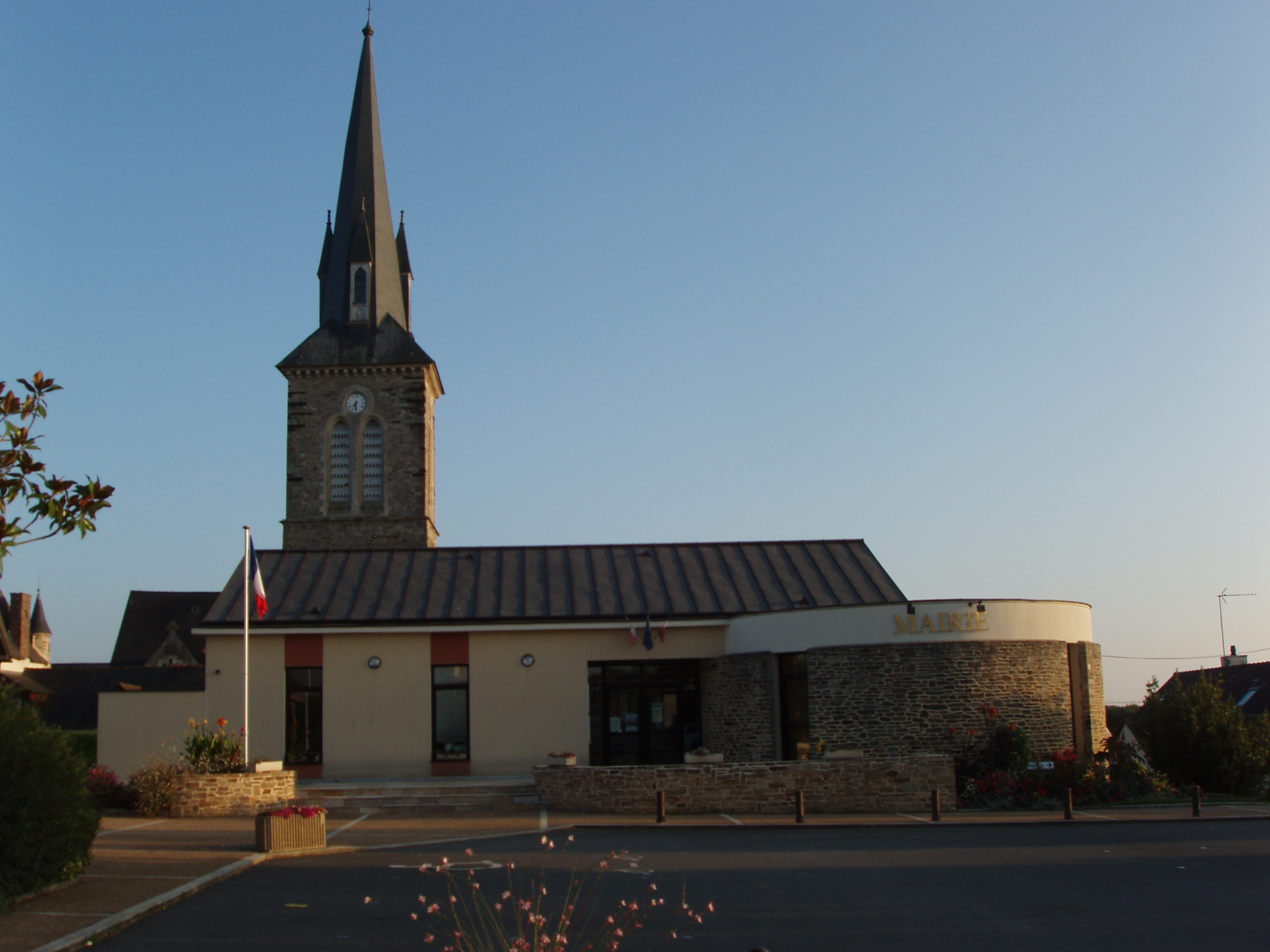
- The town hall and church
- Location of Saint-Jean-sur-Vilaine
- Location within France Location within Brittany
- Coordinates: 48°07′04″N 1°21′35″W
- Country: France
- Region: Brittany
- Department: Ille-et-Vilaine
- Arrondissement: Fougères-Vitré
- Canton: Châteaugiron
- Intercommunality: CA Vitré Communauté

Government
  - Mayor (2020–2026): Marc Fauvel
- Area^{1}: 10.73 km^{2} (4.14 sq mi)
- Highest elevation: 112 m (367 ft)
- Lowest elevation: 42 m (138 ft)
- Population (2023): 1,375
  - Density: 128.1/km^{2} (331.9/sq mi)
- Time zone: UTC+01:00 (CET)
  - Summer (DST): UTC+02:00 (CEST)
- INSEE/Postal code: 35283 /35220
- ^{1} French Land Register data, which excludes lakes, ponds, glaciers > 1 km^{2} (0.386 sq mi or 247 acres) and river estuaries.

Saint-Jean-sur-Vilaine (French pronunciation: [sɛ̃ ʒɑ̃ syʁ vilɛn]; Gallo: Saent-Jan-sur-Vilaèyn, Breton: Sant-Yann-ar-Gwilen) is a commune in the Ille-et-Vilaine department in Brittany in northwestern France.

== Population ==
Inhabitants of Saint-Jean-sur-Vilaine are called saint-jeannais in French.

Historical population
Year	Pop.	±% p.a.
1968	506	—
1975	509	+0.08%
1982	601	+2.40%
1990	675	+1.46%
1999	873	+2.90%
2007	1,081	+2.71%
2012	1,099	+0.33%
2017	1,266	+2.87%
2023	1,375	+1.39%
Source: INSEE

== See also ==
- Communes of the Ille-et-Vilaine department
