= Saint-Didier, Ille-et-Vilaine =

Saint-Didier Saent-Didier (Gallo) Sant-Ider (Breton)
- Commune
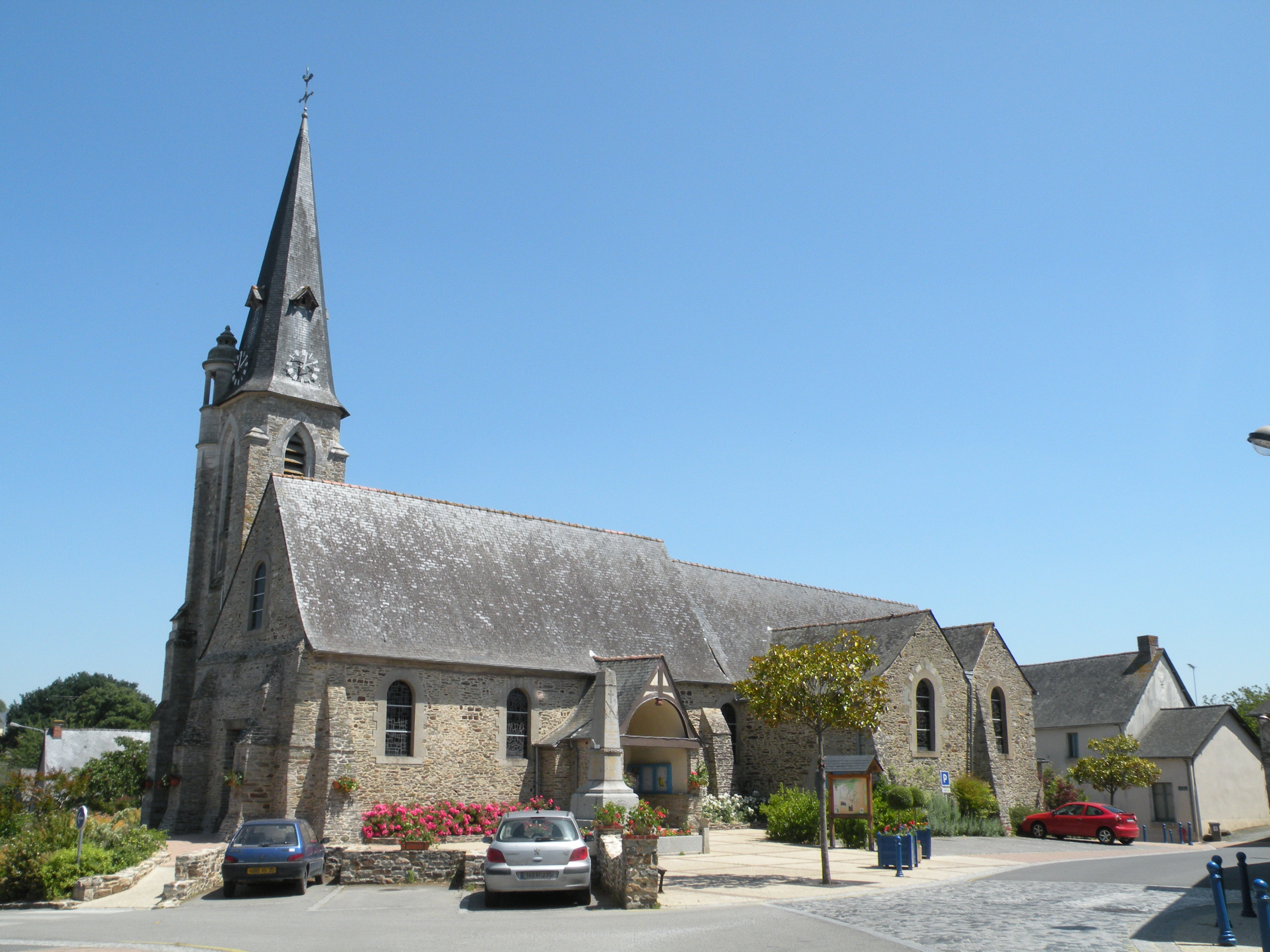
- The church of Saint-Didier

- Coat of arms
- Location of Saint-Didier
- Location within France Location within Brittany
- Coordinates: 48°05′44″N 1°22′14″W
- Country: France
- Region: Brittany
- Department: Ille-et-Vilaine
- Arrondissement: Fougères-Vitré
- Canton: Châteaugiron
- Intercommunality: CA Vitré Communauté

Government
  - Mayor (2020–2026): Joseph Jouault
- Area^{1}: 14.14 km^{2} (5.46 sq mi)
- Highest elevation: 97 m (318 ft)
- Lowest elevation: 40 m (130 ft)
- Population (2023): 2,022
  - Density: 143.0/km^{2} (370.4/sq mi)
- Time zone: UTC+01:00 (CET)
  - Summer (DST): UTC+02:00 (CEST)
- INSEE/Postal code: 35264 /35220
- ^{1} French Land Register data, which excludes lakes, ponds, glaciers > 1 km^{2} (0.386 sq mi or 247 acres) and river estuaries.

Saint-Didier (French pronunciation: [sɛ̃ didje]; Breton: Sant-Ider; Gallo: Saent-Didier) is a commune in the Ille-et-Vilaine department in Brittany in northwestern France.

== Population ==
Inhabitants of Saint-Didier are called déodatiens in French.

Historical population

Year	Pop.	±% p.a.
1793	1,226	—
1800	1,023	−2.55%
1806	1,030	+0.11%
1821	1,159	+0.79%
1831	1,134	−0.22%
1836	1,106	−0.50%
1841	1,104	−0.04%
1846	1,048	−1.04%
1851	1,055	+0.13%
1856	1,000	−1.07%
1861	980	−0.40%
1866	920	−1.26%
1872	881	−0.72%
1876	871	−0.28%
1881	841	−0.70%
1886	833	−0.19%
1891	822	−0.27%
1896	815	−0.17%
1901	848	+0.80%

Year	Pop.	±% p.a.
1906	853	+0.12%
1911	790	−1.52%
1921	725	−0.85%
1926	689	−1.01%
1931	697	+0.23%
1936	682	−0.43%
1946	691	+0.13%
1954	693	+0.04%
1962	679	−0.25%
1968	652	−0.67%
1975	679	+0.58%
1982	859	+3.42%
1990	1,055	+2.60%
1999	1,275	+2.13%
2007	1,636	+3.17%
2012	1,884	+2.86%
2017	2,052	+1.72%
2023	2,022	−0.25%

Source: EHESS and INSEE (1968-2023)

== See also ==
- Communes of the Ille-et-Vilaine department
