= Louvigné-de-Bais =

Louvigné-de-Bais Louvigneg-Baez (Breton)
- Commune
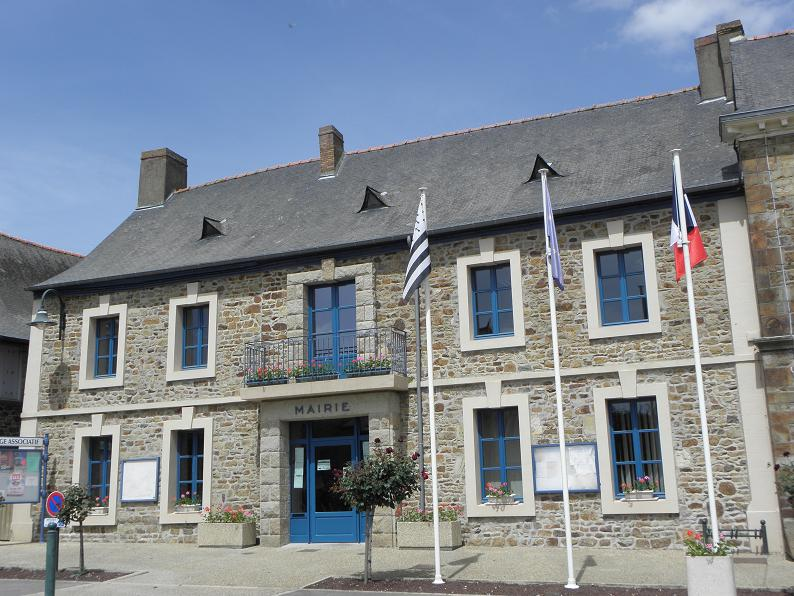
- The town hall of Louvigné-de-Bais

- Coat of arms
- Location of Louvigné-de-Bais
- Location within France Location within Brittany
- Coordinates: 48°02′57″N 1°19′46″W
- Country: France
- Region: Brittany
- Department: Ille-et-Vilaine
- Arrondissement: Fougères-Vitré
- Canton: Châteaugiron
- Intercommunality: CA Vitré Communauté

Government
  - Mayor (2020–2026): Thierry Pigeon
- Area^{1}: 15.37 km^{2} (5.93 sq mi)
- Highest elevation: 106 m (348 ft)
- Lowest elevation: 33 m (108 ft)
- Population (2023): 1,890
  - Density: 123/km^{2} (318/sq mi)
- Time zone: UTC+01:00 (CET)
  - Summer (DST): UTC+02:00 (CEST)
- INSEE/Postal code: 35161 /35680
- ^{1} French Land Register data, which excludes lakes, ponds, glaciers > 1 km^{2} (0.386 sq mi or 247 acres) and river estuaries.

Louvigné-de-Bais (French pronunciation: [luviɲe də bɛ], literally Louvigné of Bais; Breton: Louvigneg-Baez) is a commune in the Ille-et-Vilaine department of Brittany in northwestern France.

== Population ==
Inhabitants of Louvigné-de-Bais are called in French Louvignéens.

Historical population
Year	Pop.	±% p.a.
1968	1,087	—
1975	1,122	+0.45%
1982	1,124	+0.03%
1990	1,209	+0.92%
1999	1,411	+1.73%
2007	1,723	+2.53%
2012	1,690	−0.39%
2017	1,899	+2.36%
2023	1,890	−0.08%
Source: INSEE

== See also ==
- Communes of the Ille-et-Vilaine department
