= Lyubov Golanchikova =

Russian aviator (1889–1959)

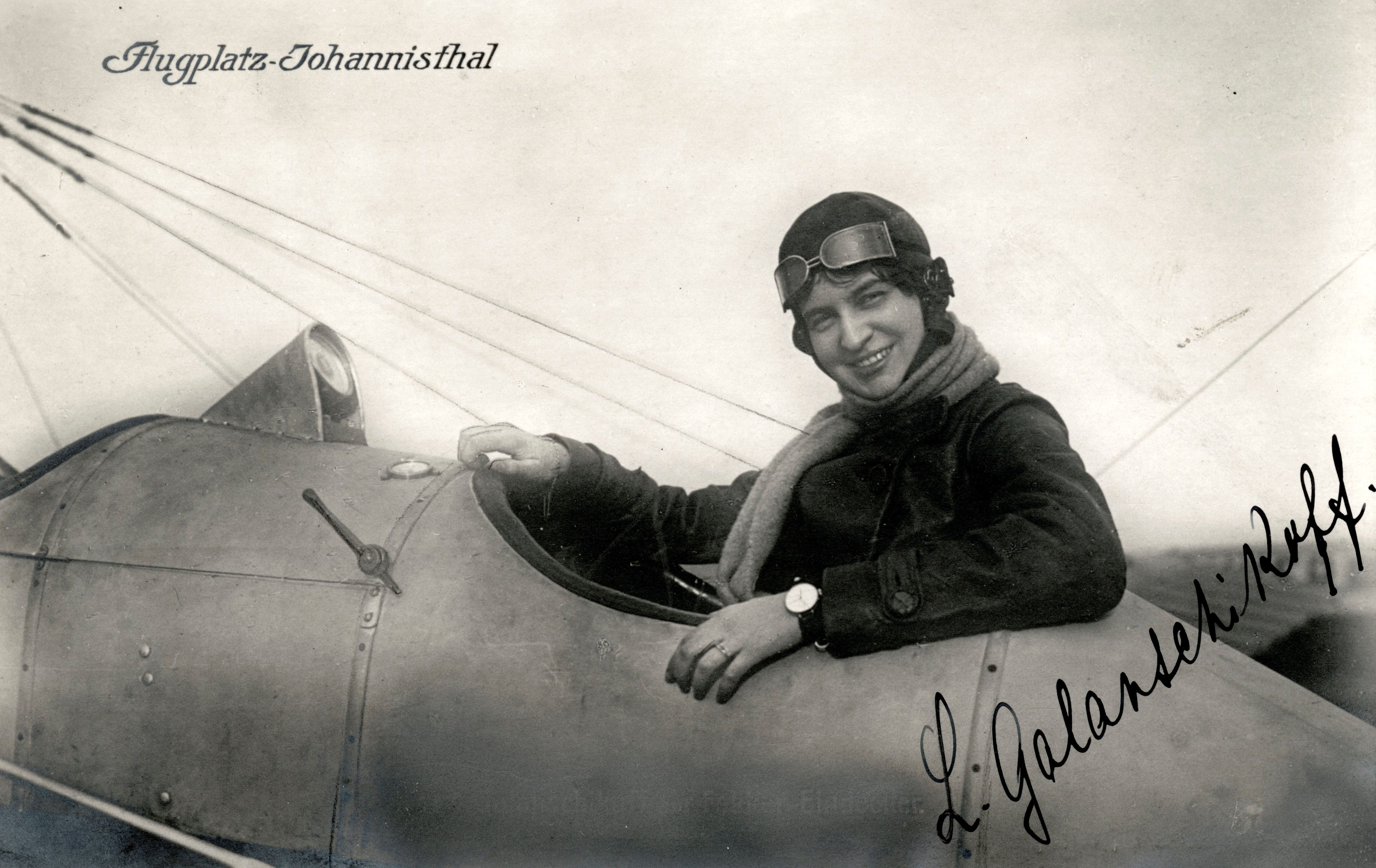
- Born: Любовь Александровна Голанчикова; 1889; Viljandi, Russian Empire (now Estonia)
- Died: 28 March 1959 (aged 69-70); New York City, United States
- Other names: Luba Phillips, Ljuba Galantchikov, Ljuba Galantschikoff, Luba Galanschikoff, Ljuba Golantšikova
- Occupations: Aviator, actress, taxi driver
- Years active: 1909–1940s
- Known for: first female test pilot

Lyubov Golanchikova (also Russian: Любовь Александровна Голанчикова, Ljuba Galantchikoff) (1889–1959) was the third woman of the Russian Empire to receive a pilot's license. She was probably born in what is now Estonia. She was the first female test pilot, testing airplanes for Anthony Fokker, the French aircraft firm Morane-Saulnier, and the Russian airplane manufacturer Fedir Tereshchenko. During World War I, she flew missions for the Red Cross, and may have flown observation missions for the Red Army during the Russian Civil War. In 1923, she moved to the United States and made several attempts to be the first woman to make a transatlantic flight, though none ever came to fruition. After 1930, she quit flying and worked in various positions, including as a taxi driver.

== Name and birthplace variants ==
There is some confusion about Golanchikova's place of birth and the spelling of her name. While her parents appear to have been ethnic Russians, there are suggestions she was born in Viljandi, now in Estonia, but at the time of her birth in the Russian Empire. Writing on the Early Birds of Aviation website in 2006, the Estonian author and aeronautical historian Toivo Kitvel of Tallinn has said, that he has a copy of the Viljandi Greek-Orthodox birth register with a record of her birth and baptism. Although she may have been brought up in St. Petersburg, Russian articles stating she was born in St. Petersburg, are probably mistaken.

As a result of the difficulty of transliterating Russian names into English and of Golanchikova's own variations in the use of her name, there are a number of variants. These include Ljuba Galantchikova (from Russian), Lioubov Golantchikova (French), Ljuba Galantschikoff (German), and Ljuba Golantšikova (Estonian). An example of her own signature in northern European cursive longhand (see photo in box) is probably L. Galantchikoff. The 'T' has sometimes been interpreted as an 'S', giving L. Galanschikoff. Even in recent times, transliterations of her name are numerous.

After her move to the United States, she used Luba Phillips for the American press, but may have used Luba Philipoff or Philippoff officially. When American press reported her maiden name, it was either as Luba Galanchikoff or as Luba Galanschikoff.

== Early life ==
Lyubov Alexandrovna Golanchikova was born in 1889 in Viljandi, then in Russian Empire, to Olga and Aleksander Golantschikoff as the sixth child. The family was Russian Orthodox, and thus carried a Russian name. Her family was of modest means. Her father worked as a postal official in Viljandi, but died before Golanchikova reached her first year of age.

The church books say, that the widowed Olga remarried on 26 August 1890 to Karl Grünwald, who was born in the Pskov Governorate, and maintained a workshop on Tartu Street 21. Through her mother's remarriage, Golanchikova now had a stepfather.

In 1910, Golanchikova went to study in Saint Petersburg. Her stepfather encouraged her to study accounting. Though she enrolled in accounting courses, she found the work uninspiring and became a child actress, working in vaudeville as a singer and dancer. She was discovered by one Arnold Oskarovtich (Arnold the son of Oskar, thought to be an Estonian), the impresario of "Folie Bergere", who invited her to perform in Villa Rode, a restaurant next to the Kolomyazhskiy hippodrome. There, she took the stage name of "Molly Moret" (Russian: Мили Море).

== Interest in flying ==
On 27 April 1910, on the grounds of the hippodrome, and also right next to Villa Rode, the first Russian air show took place, and lasted eighteen days. In addition to lesser-known Russian airmen, the show was visited by then the most popular airmen of the day: Charles Edmonds, Hubert Latham, Leon Morane, and also the first airwoman — baroness Raymonde de la Roche. Golantchikova aka "Molly More" attended with her friends as a spectator. The airshow was very successful.

Towards the end of Summer, a second airshow took place. It was called the All-Russia Aeronautics Festival, and it opened on then the new Commandant's airfield (Комендантский аэродром). The air tricks that were performed by Lebedev, Utotchkin, and Mikhail Efimov, military pilots Gorshkov, Rudnev, and others took the city by storm. After attending that festival, "Molly" began reading everything she could find about flying, and met up with the many pilots who were all young and the same age as her. In Fall 1910, Golanchikova finally got acquainted with Mikhail N. Efimov, a former electrician from Odessa, who took her on a flight as a passenger, and from then on, she decided she would learn to fly. For that, she began to collect money through the winter to attend school the next Spring.

== Education and flight school ==
When Golanchikova took up flying in 1911, she went to school and to flight lessons during the day and worked nights, graduating from high school at the same time as she received her pilot's license. She joined the Shchetinin Flying School at Gatchina airfield, passed her examination, and on 9 October 1911, became the third Russian woman with a pilot's license. (Note: Lavrenets gives Golanchikova license #59 and states she received it on 22 October 1911. The article written for the centennial of women pilots, shows Golanchikova was issued license #56 on 19 November 1911. "Postimees" has the date of Golanchikova's graduation as 9 October 1911. Lebow states Golanchikova received license #56 on 29 December 1911. Lydia Zvereva was the first licensed Russian woman aviator, Evdokia Anatra the second.)

== Air shows ==
After earning her license, Golanchikova tried to find work as a pilot or in delivery, but was unable to do so, as potential employers suggested piloting was not women's business. She realised, that if she wanted to fly, the only avenue open to her was as a performer in airshows. By then, the stage name "Molly More" was shed.

In April 1912, Golanchikova was invited by the local air club to an exhibition in Riga, where she was involved in a serious crash landing, but she escaped with minor injuries and returned to St. Petersburg. A St. Petersburg gazette recounted, that a foolish spectator had thrown a thick wooden stick at the airplane, which had caused the accident.

In late Summer 1912, the "Second Military Air Contest" was held in St. Petersburg, and though injured, Golanchikova tried out several new aircraft, performing aerobatic maneuvers with skill. She had the ability to precisely pinpoint each airplane's deficiencies, and engineers began taking notes. That also included Anthony Fokker, whom she met at the show: he asked 'Fräulein Galantchikova' her opinion about his new plane, and she told him she liked the way his planes "handled".

Subsequently, Fokker invited Golanchikova to Berlin to participate in an international airshow to be held in Fall 1912. For the next several months, she flew in barnstorming events throughout rural Russia and Poland.

At the international airshow held on 22 November 1912, Golanchikova took to the air setting a new world altitude record for women of 2,200 meters, crushing the previous record of 825 meters held by German pilot Melli Beese.

== Career ==
In early 1913, Golanchikova was offered a job by Fokker to work as his chief pilot, flying to European cities to promote his aircraft. Fokker was reported to be in love with Golanchikova, considering her to be the perfect woman. When she started flying his planes, he thought that having a pretty woman involved would be "great publicity". Though she was homesick, she was determined to stay in Germany, because she would not be able to find professional work as a pilot in Russia. But, in July 1913, the French aircraft firm Morane-Saulnier produced a two-seater plane and hired Léon Letort to test it. He flew the leg from Paris to Berlin, and then offered Golanchikova the opportunity to fly with him on the return trip as navigator. After she obtained Fokker's agreement to make the flight with Letort, they took off for Paris. Bad weather conditions plagued the flight and after much difficulty, four days later they crashed in a field near the town of Bray-sur-Seine, about 100 km southeast of Paris. The plane was not damaged and the following day the duo was feted with a large reception.

When she returned to her room at Hôtel du Brabant, Golanchikova's room was full of floral bouquets, one of which had the business card of Fedor Fedorovich Tereshchenko, a wealthy Russian sugar producer. Tereshchenko owned an aircraft construction business and wanted to hire someone to test his designs. When her contract with Fokker expired, four months later, Golanchikova returned to Russia to work for Tereshchenko. On 1 December 1913, she signed a contract to become the first female test pilot, agreeing to test "Farman-22" aircraft manufactured in the Chervonskaya airplane workshop, in Chervone. (Note: Zakharov states that a copy of Golanchikova's contract was found in the Central State Historical Archive of the Ukrainian SSR and is dated 1 December 1913. Lavrenets gives the date of Golanchikova's contract as 14 December 1913.) When her contract was up at the end of a year, Golanchikova returned to Moscow and married Boris Philipoff, who was known as the "Bread King of Russia".

During World War I, Golanchikova carried Red Cross supplies and in 1917, she flew as an observer for the Imperial Air Force, serving with the 26th Corps Reconnaissance Squadron. During the Russian Revolution, Golanchikova switched sides and flew for the Red Air Fleet, as well as training their pilots. She may have flown several missions for the revolutionary forces during the civil war.

In October 1923, "Boris and Lubow Philipoff" (per the manifest) emigrated to the United States aboard the White Star Line's S.S. Baltic. After arriving in the U.S. she became known as Luba Phillips in the United States and Ljuba or Luba Galanchikoff abroad. In June, 1927, Phillips tried for an altitude record flying with W. L. Stultz at the controls. Though there were observers from the press and the altimeter rose to eleven thousand feet, the flight was unofficial, as no representatives of the National Aeronautic Association were in attendance.

Phillips planned to make a transatlantic flight from New York to Rome on 10 July 1927 but the plan did not materialize. Three days after the failed attempt, she was still hoping to become the first woman to cross the Atlantic. Phillips signed a one-year contract for picture rights with the theatrical producer Oliver Morosco for the attempt. Though she made several plans, New York to France, New York to London, New York to Leningrad she did not complete any of the trips and appears to have stopped flying by 1930, when she was working in a beauty parlor at the Hotel Ansonia in New York City. Her husband died in Manhattan in 1936 and in the 1940s Phillips drove a taxi in New York City.

Phillips died on 28 March 1959, in New York City.
