= Domagné =

Domagné Dovanieg (Breton)
- Commune
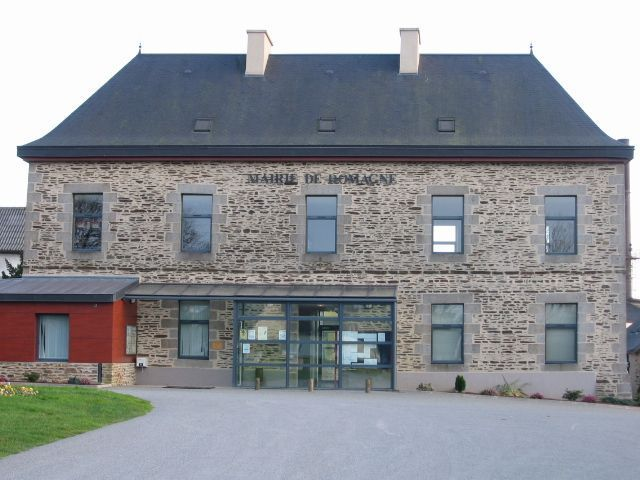
- Town hall

- Coat of arms
- Location of Domagné
- Location within France Location within Brittany
- Coordinates: 48°04′16″N 1°23′25″W
- Country: France
- Region: Brittany
- Department: Ille-et-Vilaine
- Arrondissement: Fougères-Vitré
- Canton: Châteaugiron
- Intercommunality: CA Vitré Communauté

Government
  - Mayor (2020–2026): Bernard Renou
- Area^{1}: 29.00 km^{2} (11.20 sq mi)
- Highest elevation: 96 m (315 ft)
- Lowest elevation: 43 m (141 ft)
- Population (2023): 2,491
  - Density: 85.90/km^{2} (222.5/sq mi)
- Time zone: UTC+01:00 (CET)
  - Summer (DST): UTC+02:00 (CEST)
- INSEE/Postal code: 35096 /35113
- Website: www.domagne.fr
- ^{1} French Land Register data, which excludes lakes, ponds, glaciers > 1 km^{2} (0.386 sq mi or 247 acres) and river estuaries.

Domagné (French pronunciation: [dɔmaɲe]; Breton: Dovanieg) is a commune in the Ille-et-Vilaine department in Brittany in northwestern France. In 1974, it absorbed the former commune Chaumeré.

== Population ==
Inhabitants of Domagné are called Domagnéens in French. Population data refer to the commune in its geography as of January 2025.

Historical population
| Year | Pop. | ±% p.a. |
|---|---|---|
| 1968 | 1,232 | — |
| 1975 | 1,220 | −0.14% |
| 1982 | 1,487 | +2.87% |
| 1990 | 1,499 | +0.10% |
| 1999 | 1,633 | +0.96% |
| 2007 | 1,975 | +2.41% |
| 2012 | 2,255 | +2.69% |
| 2017 | 2,305 | +0.44% |
| 2023 | 2,491 | +1.30% |
Source: INSEE

== See also ==
- Communes of the Ille-et-Vilaine department
