= Servon-sur-Vilaine =

Servon-sur-Vilaine Servon (Gallo & Breton)
- Commune
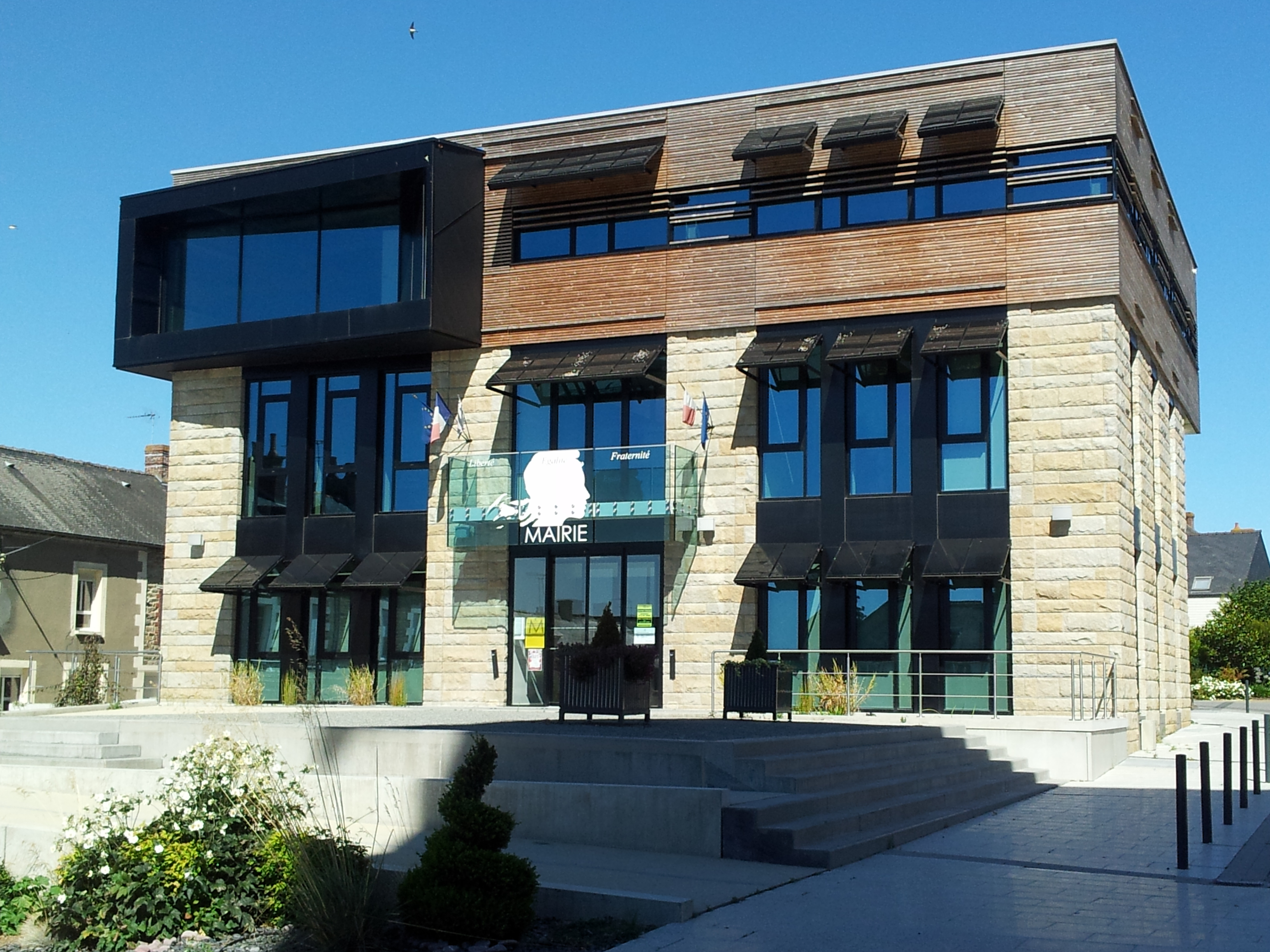
- The town hall of Servon-sur-Vilaine
- Location of Servon-sur-Vilaine
- Location within France Location within Brittany
- Coordinates: 48°07′20″N 1°27′34″W
- Country: France
- Region: Brittany
- Department: Ille-et-Vilaine
- Arrondissement: Rennes
- Canton: Châteaugiron
- Intercommunality: Pays de Châteaugiron

Government
  - Mayor (2020–2026): Melaine Morin
- Area^{1}: 15.26 km^{2} (5.89 sq mi)
- Highest elevation: 91 m (299 ft)
- Lowest elevation: 34 m (112 ft)
- Population (2023): 4,152
  - Density: 272.1/km^{2} (704.7/sq mi)
- Time zone: UTC+01:00 (CET)
  - Summer (DST): UTC+02:00 (CEST)
- INSEE/Postal code: 35327 /35530
- ^{1} French Land Register data, which excludes lakes, ponds, glaciers > 1 km^{2} (0.386 sq mi or 247 acres) and river estuaries.

Servon-sur-Vilaine (French pronunciation: [sɛʁvɔ̃ syʁ vilɛn]; Breton: Servon, Gallo: Servon) is a commune in the Ille-et-Vilaine department in Brittany in northwestern France.

== Population ==
Inhabitants of Servon-sur-Vilaine are called Servonnais in French.

Historical population
Year	Pop.	±% p.a.
1968	1,284	—
1975	1,503	+2.28%
1982	1,995	+4.13%
1990	2,494	+2.83%
1999	2,916	+1.75%
2007	3,403	+1.95%
2012	3,534	+0.76%
2017	3,676	+0.79%
2023	4,152	+2.05%
Source: INSEE

== See also ==
- Communes of the Ille-et-Vilaine department
