= Châteaugiron =

Châteaugiron Chaujon (Gallo) Kastell-Geron (Breton)
- Commune
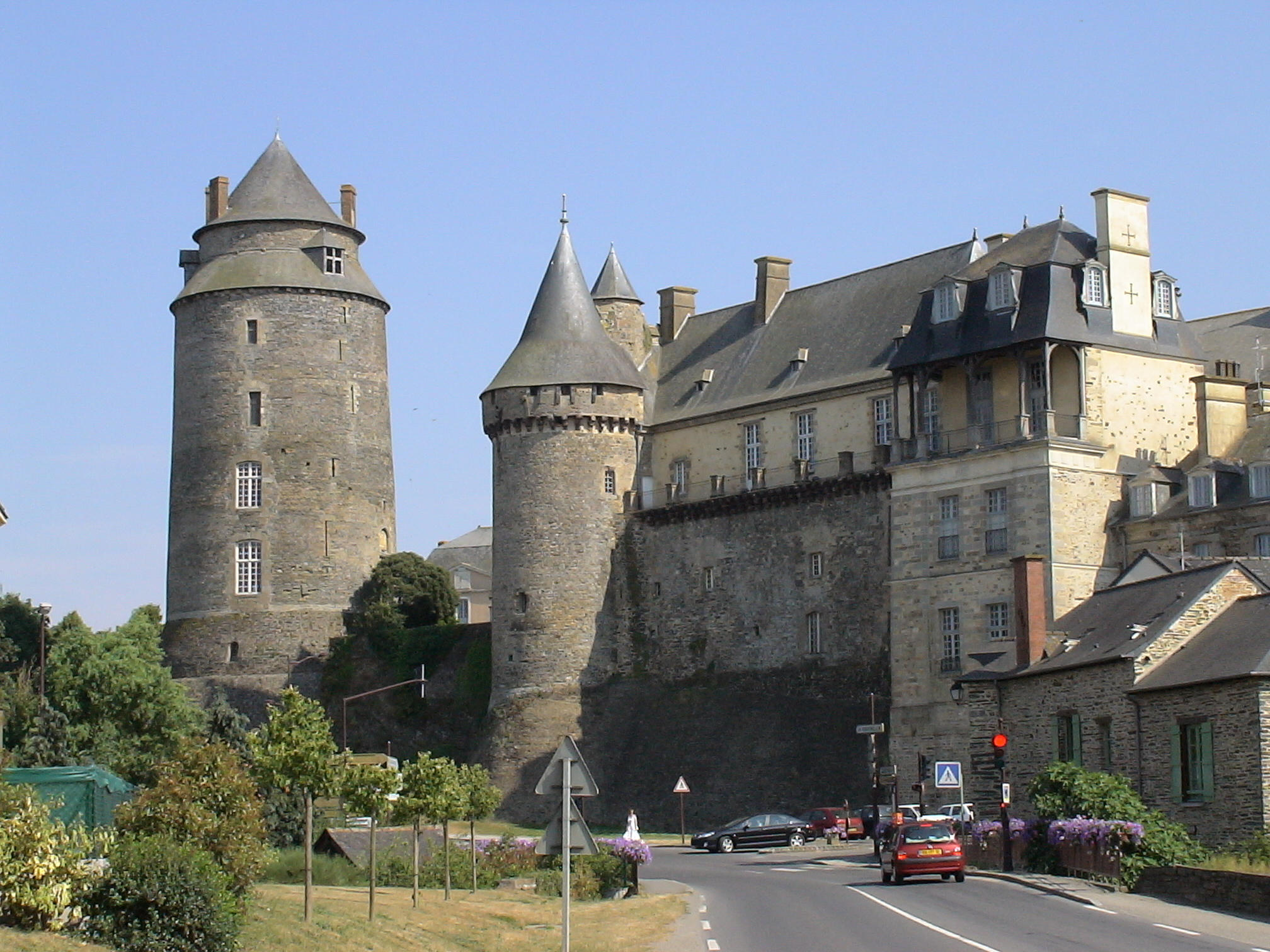
- Castle of Châteaugiron

- Flag Coat of arms
- Location of Châteaugiron
- Location within France Location within Brittany
- Coordinates: 48°02′56″N 1°30′07″W
- Country: France
- Region: Brittany
- Department: Ille-et-Vilaine
- Arrondissement: Rennes
- Canton: Châteaugiron
- Intercommunality: Pays de Châteaugiron

Government
  - Mayor (2020–2026): Yves Renault
- Area^{1}: 23.52 km^{2} (9.08 sq mi)
- Highest elevation: 78 m (256 ft)
- Lowest elevation: 28 m (92 ft)
- Population (2023): 10,845
  - Density: 461.1/km^{2} (1,194/sq mi)
- Time zone: UTC+01:00 (CET)
  - Summer (DST): UTC+02:00 (CEST)
- INSEE/Postal code: 35069 /35410
- ^{1} French Land Register data, which excludes lakes, ponds, glaciers > 1 km^{2} (0.386 sq mi or 247 acres) and river estuaries.

Châteaugiron (French: [ʃɑtoʒiʁɔ̃]; Breton: Kastell-Geron; Gallo: Chaujon) is a commune in the Ille-et-Vilaine department of Brittany in northwestern France. It extended on 1 January 2017 by merging with the former communes of Saint-Aubin-du-Pavail and Ossé. Châteaugiron castle dates from the 12th century, and now houses the town hall. Its oldest part is the apse of the chapel; the keep dates from the 13th-14th century.

== Population ==
Inhabitants of Châteaugiron are called Castelgironnais and Castelgironnaises in French. Population data given in the table and graph below refer to the area corresponding with the commune as of January 2025.

Historical population
Year	Pop.	±% p.a.
1968	2,802	—
1975	3,061	+1.27%
1982	4,316	+5.03%
1990	5,368	+2.76%
1999	6,863	+2.77%
2007	8,221	+2.28%
2012	8,928	+1.66%
2017	9,966	+2.22%
2023	10,845	+1.42%
Source: INSEE

== Sister cities ==
- Puszczykowo, Poland

== Gallery ==
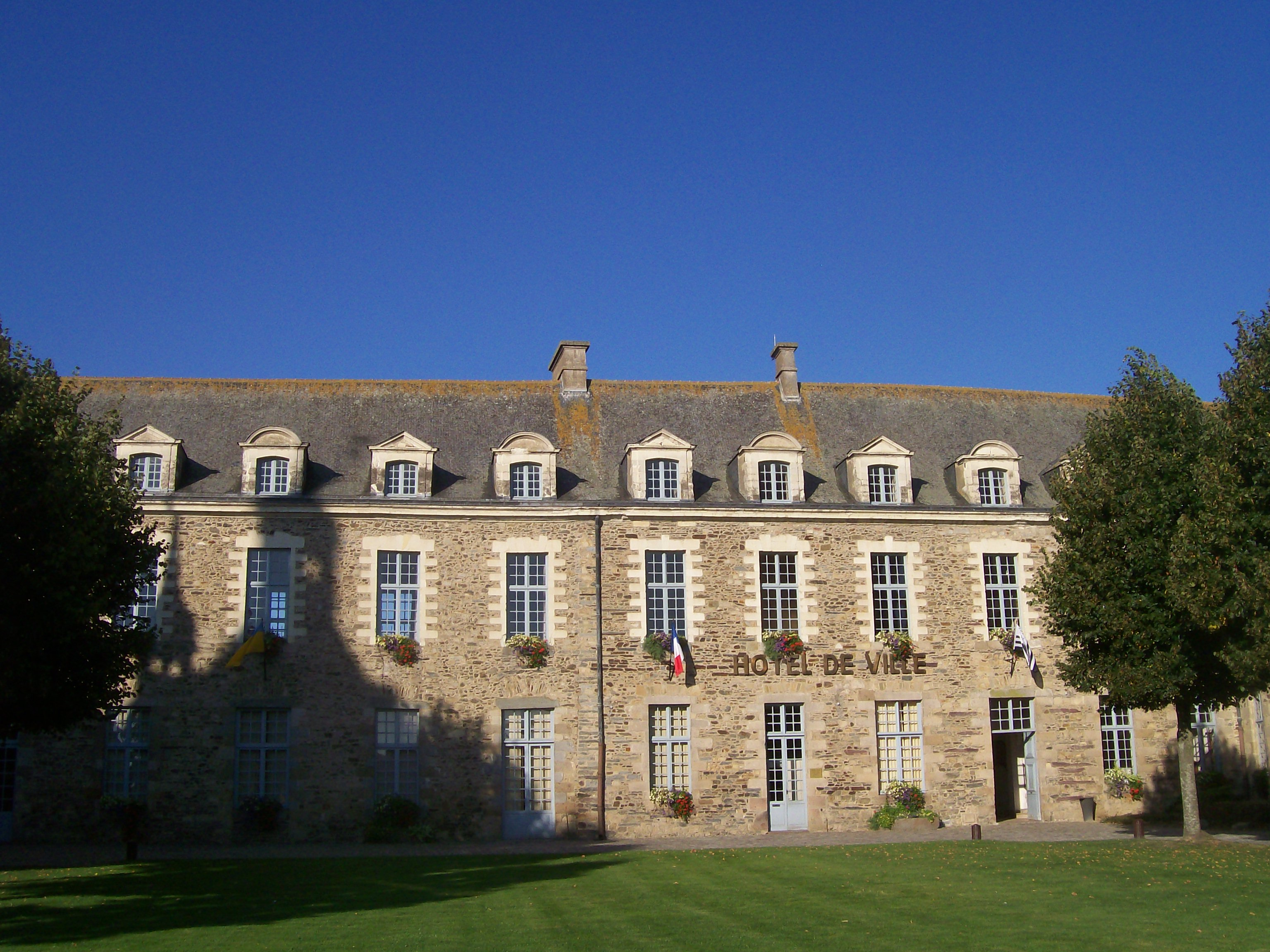
Town hall

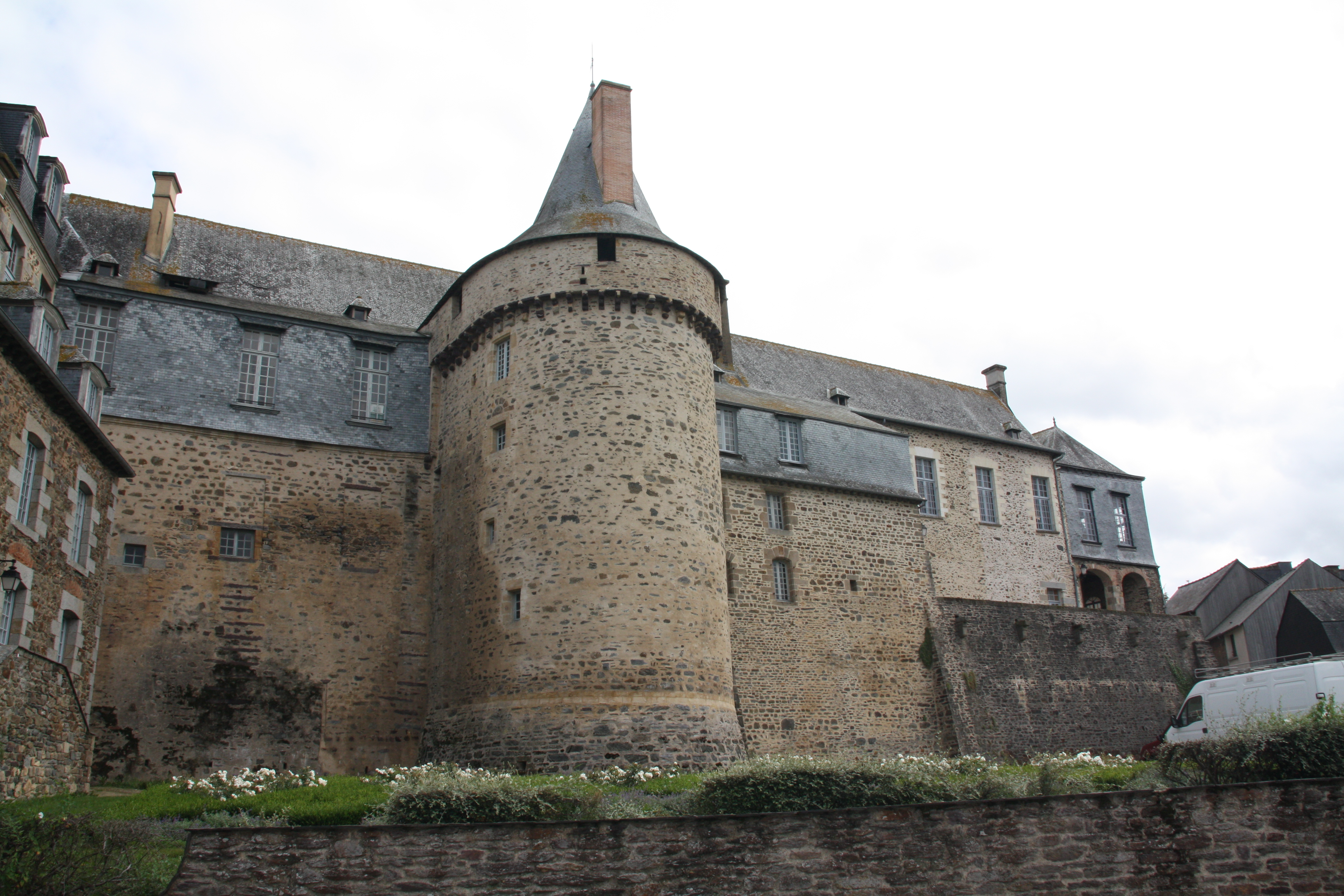

== See also ==
- Communes of the Ille-et-Vilaine department
