= Domloup =

Domloup Donlô (Gallo)
- Commune
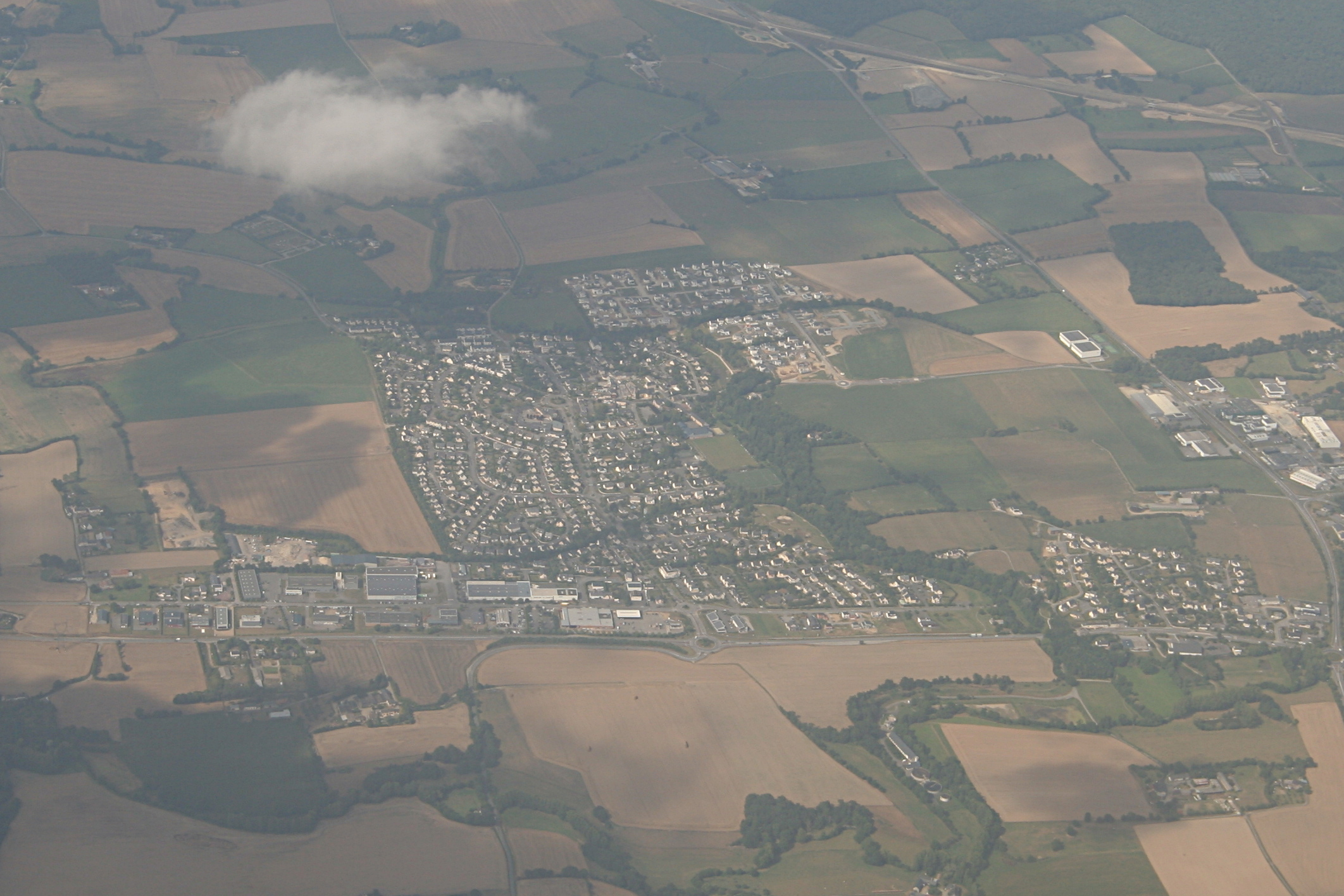
- Aerial view

- Coat of arms
- Location of Domloup
- Location within France Location within Brittany
- Coordinates: 48°03′46″N 1°31′19″W
- Country: France
- Region: Brittany
- Department: Ille-et-Vilaine
- Arrondissement: Rennes
- Canton: Châteaugiron
- Intercommunality: Pays de Châteaugiron

Government
  - Mayor (2020–2026): Jacky Lechâble
- Area^{1}: 18.55 km^{2} (7.16 sq mi)
- Highest elevation: 87 m (285 ft)
- Lowest elevation: 33 m (108 ft)
- Population (2023): 3,877
  - Density: 209.0/km^{2} (541.3/sq mi)
- Time zone: UTC+01:00 (CET)
  - Summer (DST): UTC+02:00 (CEST)
- INSEE/Postal code: 35099 /35410
- ^{1} French Land Register data, which excludes lakes, ponds, glaciers > 1 km^{2} (0.386 sq mi or 247 acres) and river estuaries.

Domloup (French pronunciation: [dɔ̃lu]; Gallo: Donlô) is a commune in the Ille-et-Vilaine department in Brittany in northwestern France.

== Population ==
Inhabitants of Domloup are called Domloupéens in French.

Historical population
Year	Pop.	±% p.a.
1968	673	—
1975	862	+3.60%
1982	1,239	+5.32%
1990	1,499	+2.41%
1999	2,425	+5.49%
2007	2,802	+1.82%
2012	2,908	+0.75%
2017	3,522	+3.91%
2023	3,877	+1.61%
Source: INSEE

== See also ==
- Communes of the Ille-et-Vilaine department
