= Canton of Châteaugiron =

Coordinates: 48.0654°N 1.4961°W

Châteaugiron
- Canton
- Country: France
- Region: Brittany
- Department: Ille-et-Vilaine
- No. of communes: {{{nbcomm}}}
- Area: 240.25 km^{2} (92.76 sq mi)
- Population (2023): 44,406
  - Density: 184.83/km^{2} (478.71/sq mi)
- INSEE code: 35 05

The Canton of Châteaugiron is a canton of France, in the Ille-et-Vilaine département, located in the northeast of the department. At the French canton reorganisation which came into effect in March 2015, the canton was expanded from 9 to 14 communes (5 of which merged into the new communes Châteaugiron and Piré-Chancé):

- Boistrudan
- Châteaubourg
- Châteaugiron
- Domagné
- Domloup
- Louvigné-de-Bais
- Noyal-sur-Vilaine
- Piré-Chancé
- Saint-Didier
- Saint-Jean-sur-Vilaine
- Servon-sur-Vilaine
