= List of windmills in Ille-et-Vilaine =

A list of windmills in Ille-et-Vilaine, France.

Location	Name of mill	Type	Built	Notes	Photograph
Amanlis	**Moulin d'Amanlis**	Moulin Tour	1858	Moulins-a-Vent (in French)	
Argentré-du-Plassis	Moulin de Salé				
Bain-de-Bretagne (Pommeniac)	**Moulin de Pommeniac**	Moulin Tour		Moulins-a-Vent (in French)	
Bains-sur-Oust	Moulin des Couëdies				
Bréal-sous-Montfort	Moulin de la Roche du Bois	Moulin Tour		Moulins-a-Vent (in French)	
Bruc-sur-Aff	**Moulin du bois Hulin**	Moulin Tour	16th century	Moulins-a-Vent (in French)	
Bruc-sur-Aff	Moulin du bois Orhand				
Campel	Moulin de la Gaudais				
Campel	Moulin du Rocher				
Cancale	Moulin le Tertre à la Caille	Moulin Tour	1828	Ministère de la Culture (in French)	
Chanteloup	Moulin du Morihan	Moulin Tour		Moulins-a-Vent (in French)	
Cherrueix	**Moulin Neuf**	Moulin Tour		Moulins-a-Vent (in French)	
Cherrueix	**Moulin des Mondrins**	Moulin Tour		Moulins-a-Vent (in French)	
Cherrueix	**Moulin de la Colimassière**	Moulin Tour		Moulins-a-Vent (in French)	
Cherrueix	**Moulin de la Saline**	Moulin Tour	1870	Moulins-a-Vent (in French)	
Corps-Nuds		Moulin Tour			
Epiniac	Moulin des Ormes				
Guipry	**Moulin Sainte Marie**	Moulin Tour	19th century	Moulins-a-Vent (in French)	
Guipry	Moulin près de la Grande Rivière				
Guipry	Moulin des Bruyères				
Hirel	**Moulin sur la RD155** #1	Moulin Tour		Moulins-a-Vent (in French)	
Hirel	**Moulin sur la RD155** #2	Moulin Tour		Moulins-a-Vent (in French)	
Hirel	**Moulin de la Petite Pâture**	Moulin Tour		Moulins-a-Vent (in French)	
Hirel	**Moulin de la Pintonnière**	Moulin Tour		Moulins-a-Vent (in French)	
Hirel	**Moulin de St Lunaire**	Moulin Tour		Moulins-a-Vent (in French)	
Hirel	**Moulin du Châtelier**	Moulin Tour		Moulins-a-Vent (in French)	
La Chapelle-de-Brain	Moulin de Tru	Moulin Tour		Moulins-a-Vent (in French)	
La Grée-Charruel	**Moulin de La Grée Charruel**	Moulin Tour		Moulins-a-Vent (in French)	
La Noë-Blanche	**Moulin Chaignet**	Moulin Tour		Moulins-a-Vent (in French)	
La Grand-Fougeray	**Moulin de la Haute Bourgeonnais**	Moulin Tour		Moulins-a-Vent (in French)	
Marcillé-Robert	**Moulin du Freux**	Moulin Tour		Moulins-a-Vent (in French)	
Marcillé-Robert	**Moulin des Malabrys**	Moulin Tour		Moulins-a-Vent (in French)	
Melesse	Moulin de Melesse				
Messac	**Moulin de la Perrais**	Moulin Tour		Moulins-a-Vent (in French)	
Mont-Dol	Moulin du Tertre #1	Moulin Tour		Moulins-a-Vent (in French)	
Mont-Dol	Moulin du Tertre #2	Moulin Tour		Moulins-a-Vent (in French)	
Paimpont	Moulin du Marais			Ruin	
Pipriac	**Moulin des Frotz**; **Moulin des Fraux**	Moulin Tour	1860	Moulins-a-Vent (in French)	
Pipriac	**Moulin du Tertre**	Moulin Tour	1889	Moulins-a-Vent (in French)	
Renac	**Moulin de la Grée**	Moulin Tour		Moulins-a-Vent (in French)	
Renac	**Moulin des Buttes** #1	Moulin Tour		Moulins-a-Vent (in French)	
Renac	**Moulin des Buttes** #2	Moulin Tour		Moulins-a-Vent (in French)	
		Moulin Tour		Moulins-a-Vent] (in French)	
Saint-Anne-sur-Vilaine	**Moulin de Belle Née**	Moulin Tour	1832	Moulins-a-Vent (in French)	
Saint-Benoît-des-Ondes	**Moulin Sans Souci**	Moulin Tour		Moulins-a-Vent (in French)	
Saint-Briac-sur-Mer	Moulin Bellevue	Moulin Tour		Moulins-a-Vent (in French)	
Saint-Briac-sur-Mer	Moulin de la Nisan	Moulin Tour		Moulins-a-Vent (in French)	
Saint-Coulomb	Moulin de la Masse				
Saint-Coulomb	Moulin de St Vincent				
Saint-Ganton	Moulin de la Tombe	Moulin Tour			
Saint-Just	**Moulin du Bot**	Moulin Tour		Moulins-a-Vent (in French)	
Saint-Just	**Moulin de Cojoux**	Moulin Tour		Moulins-a-Vent (in French)	
Saint-Malo	(two mills)	Moulin Tours			
Saint-Méloir-des-Ondes	Moulin de Vaulérault				
Saint-Méloir-des-Ondes	Moulin des Landes				
Saint-Méloir-des-Ondes.	**Moulin des Nielles** #1	Moulin Tour		Moulins-a-Vent (in French)	
Saint-Méloir-des-Ondes	**Moulin des Nielles** #2	Moulin Tour		Moulins-a-Vent (in French)	
Saint-Méloir-des-Ondes	Moulin du Bourg	Moulin Tour			
Saint-Suliac	Moulin de la Chaise	Moulin Tour			
Saint-Suliac	Moulin de Mont Garrot	Moulin Tour			
Saint-Sulpice-des-Landes	**Moulin de la Belle Frie**	Moulin Tour		Moulins-a-Vent (in French)	
Teillay	**Moulin de la Vallée**	Moulin Tour		Moulins-a-Vent (in French)	
Trémeheuc	Moulin à Rochefort				
Tresbœuf	**Moulin de Tresboeuf**	Moulin Tour		Moulins-a-Vent (in French)	
Tressé	Moulin du Gué Briand				
