= Saint-Nicolas-de-Redon =

- Commune
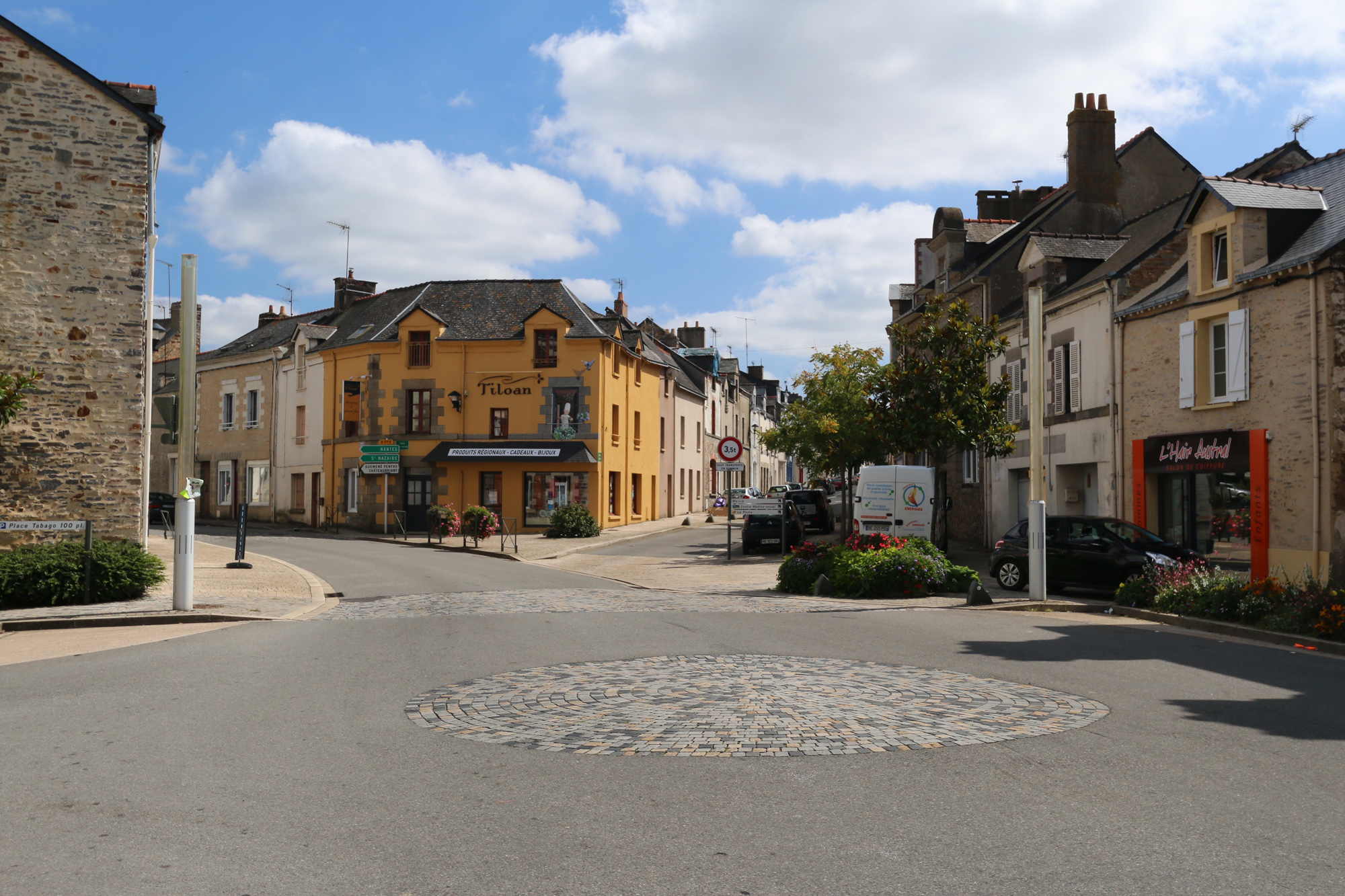
- A view within Saint-Nicolas-de-Redon

- Coat of arms
- Location of Saint-Nicolas-de-Redon
- Location within France Location within Pays de la Loire
- Coordinates: 47°38′42″N 2°03′54″W
- Country: France
- Region: Pays de la Loire
- Department: Loire-Atlantique
- Arrondissement: Châteaubriant-Ancenis
- Canton: Pontchâteau
- Intercommunality: Redon Agglomération

Government
  - Mayor (2020–2026): Albert Guihard
- Area^{1}: 22.32 km^{2} (8.62 sq mi)
- Elevation: 7 m (23 ft)
- Highest elevation: 73 m (240 ft)
- Lowest elevation: 0 m (0 ft)
- Population (2023): 3,311
  - Density: 148.3/km^{2} (384.2/sq mi)
- Time zone: UTC+01:00 (CET)
  - Summer (DST): UTC+02:00 (CEST)
- INSEE/Postal code: 44185 /44460
- ^{1} French Land Register data, which excludes lakes, ponds, glaciers > 1 km^{2} (0.386 sq mi or 247 acres) and river estuaries.

Saint-Nicolas-de-Redon (French pronunciation: [sɛ̃ nikɔla də ʁədɔ̃], literally Saint-Nicolas of Redon; Breton: Sant-Nikolaz-an-Hent) is a commune in the Loire-Atlantique department in western France.

The surrounding communities are Avessac and Fégréac in Loire-Atlantique, Rieux and Saint-Jean-la-Poterie in Morbihan, Redon and Sainte-Marie in Ille-et-Vilaine.

== Population ==
Historical population
Year	Pop.	±% p.a.
1968	2,568	—
1975	2,763	+1.05%
1982	2,951	+0.94%
1990	2,917	−0.14%
1999	2,800	−0.45%
2007	2,962	+0.71%
2012	3,146	+1.21%
2017	3,179	+0.21%
2023	3,311	+0.68%
Source: INSEE

== See also ==
- Communes of the Loire-Atlantique department
