= Langon, Ille-et-Vilaine =

Langon Langon (Gallo) Landegon (Breton)
- Commune
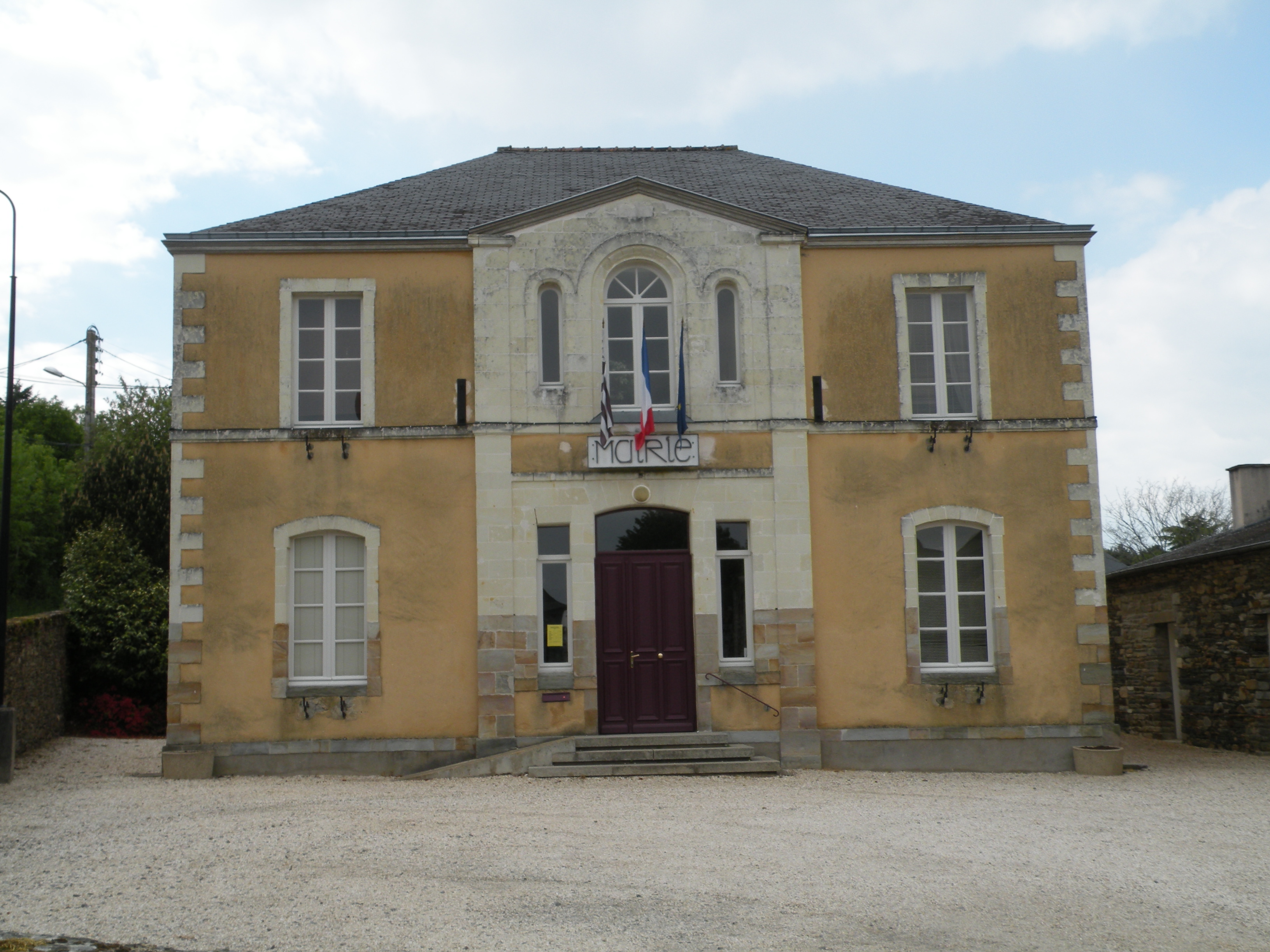
- The town hall in Langon

- Coat of arms
- Location of Langon
- Location within France Location within Brittany
- Coordinates: 47°43′13″N 1°50′48″W
- Country: France
- Region: Brittany
- Department: Ille-et-Vilaine
- Arrondissement: Redon
- Canton: Redon
- Intercommunality: Redon Agglomération

Government
  - Mayor (2020–2026): Jean Yves Colléaux
- Area^{1}: 36.54 km^{2} (14.11 sq mi)
- Elevation: 20 m (66 ft)
- Highest elevation: 97 m (318 ft)
- Lowest elevation: 1 m (3.3 ft)
- Population (2023): 1,423
  - Density: 38.94/km^{2} (100.9/sq mi)
- Time zone: UTC+01:00 (CET)
  - Summer (DST): UTC+02:00 (CEST)
- INSEE/Postal code: 35145 /35660
- ^{1} French Land Register data, which excludes lakes, ponds, glaciers > 1 km^{2} (0.386 sq mi or 247 acres) and river estuaries.

Langon (French pronunciation: [lɑ̃ɡɔ̃]; Breton: Landegon; Gallo: Langon) is a commune in the Ille-et-Vilaine department in Brittany in northwestern France.

== Geography ==
Langon is in the region of Brittany, close to the border with the Pays de Loire region. It is located 22 km (14 mi) from Redon, 60 km (37 mi) from Rennes (the capital of Brittany), and 70 km (43 mi) from Nantes and Saint Nazaire.

The Vilaine river, which flows through Vitré and Rennes, borders the territory of Langon over a distance of 14 km, then flows on into the Atlantic Ocean. Langon has one of the best preserved pastoral countrysides in all of Brittany.

== History ==
The earliest traces of human activity on the territory of present-day Langon date back to around 10,000 BCE, in the Mesolithic era. By the end of the 19th century, 35 megalithic groupings had been discovered, many of which have since been razed.

The city's Roman heritage is evidenced in the Chapelle de Sainte Agathe, the villa de Balac, and a stretch of paved road. The first Christian communities established themselves in the area starting at the end of the 5th century. The town was built around the chapel.

Starting in the 9th century, the history of the village becomes intertwined with that of the Abbey of Redon. It is in the records of this Abbey that the name of the parish is written using various Latin spellings ("Langedon", "Langeco", "Lanco", and "Lancon").

Langon found itself at the very edge of Brittany, when the Vilaine river became the border between the Breton territory and the French territory.

In the 19th century, the arrival of the railroad through town brought a dynamic economic development and prosperity that had never been experienced. It was during this time that the village took on the look and feel that persists in much of the town to this day. World War II brought an abrupt end to this development.

== Population ==
Inhabitants of Langon are called Langonnais in French.

Historical population
| Year | Pop. | ±% p.a. |
|---|---|---|
| 1968 | 1,415 | — |
| 1975 | 1,141 | −3.03% |
| 1982 | 1,214 | +0.89% |
| 1990 | 1,261 | +0.48% |
| 1999 | 1,281 | +0.17% |
| 2007 | 1,423 | +1.32% |
| 2012 | 1,454 | +0.43% |
| 2017 | 1,421 | −0.46% |
| 2023 | 1,423 | +0.02% |
Source: INSEE

== Sights ==
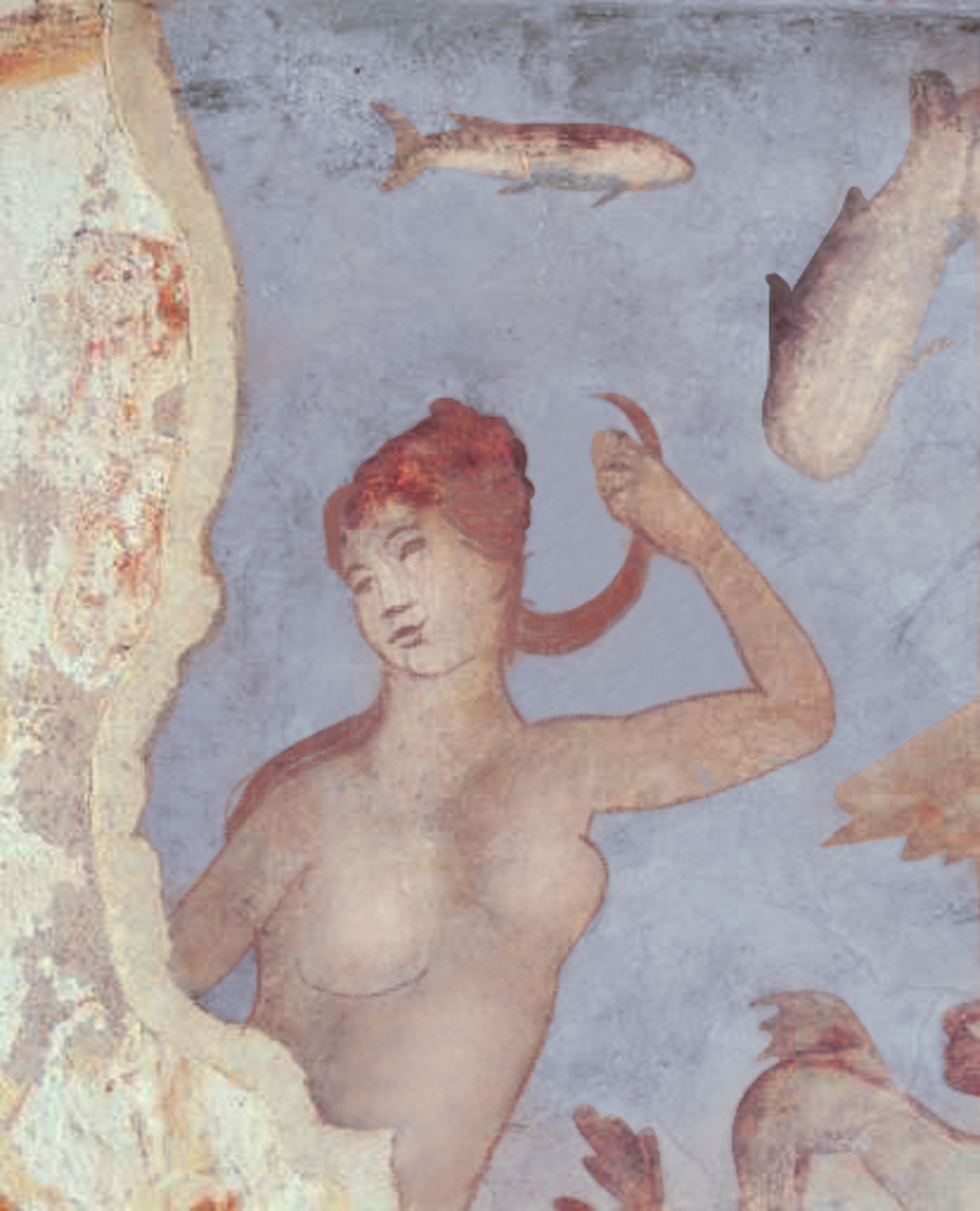
Roman fresco from the Chapelle de Sainte Agathe

Langon is distinctive because of its archeological heritage. Many different eras of history are represented in the surrounding area: the Neolithic with the town's megaliths, the Roman era with the Chapelle de Sainte Agathe and a segment of a Roman road in the town, the Modern Era with its numerous mansions, the Corbinières viaduct and, 2 kilometres to the north, the Porte de la Roche (a monument commemorating the villagers shot by the retreating German army near the end of World War II).

The chapelle Sainte-Agathe, with a history of 18 centuries, is famous for the Roman paintings on the inside. It was originally built as a Gallo-Roman spa at the end of the 2nd century, then converted to a church in the Middle Ages (6th-7th centuries). It was used as a funerary chapel in the 10th century. To this day, a Roman fresco depicting Venus emerging from the water and surrounded by all sorts of fish has survived.

There are a number of megaliths in Langon and in the surrounding area (particularly in the neighboring town of [St. Just]). One such arrangement has been named the "Demoiselles de Langon", or the "Damsels of Langon". The arrangement consists of around 20 stones, averaging around 1 metre (3 ft) in height.

The Corbinieres viaduct spans the Vilaine river. More than 30 metres high, it links Langon to Messac. It was completed in 1861. The viaduct has distinctive skewed arches. For this reason, it is considered to be one of the most attractive viaducts in France. In addition, its pillars house an important bat colony.

== Bibliography ==
- Cyrille Chaigneau, Kristell Chuniaud, La chapelle Sainte-Agathe de Langon, étude de bâti, Université François Rabelais de Tours, maîtrise "archéologie préventive", 1994, (Archives d'I&V - Mémoire 2 J 665).
- R. Royer, "Un monument gallo-romain en Armorique, la chappelle de Langon," Archaeologia, tresors des ages 1981, no. 157: 16-21.
- Nicole Rocher, Vestiges d'un lointain passé, à Langon en Ille-et-Vilaine, mémoire de C.P.R. de Rennes, 1967, manuscrit calligraphié, illustré, 55 pages, (Archives d'I&V - 2 J 1028).
- Fernand Daucé, Historique des recherches sur le monument funéraire gallo-romain de Langon, Annales de Bretagne, n° 68, 1, 1961, pp 115–146.

== See also ==
- Communes of the Ille-et-Vilaine department
