= Don (Vilaine) =

River in France

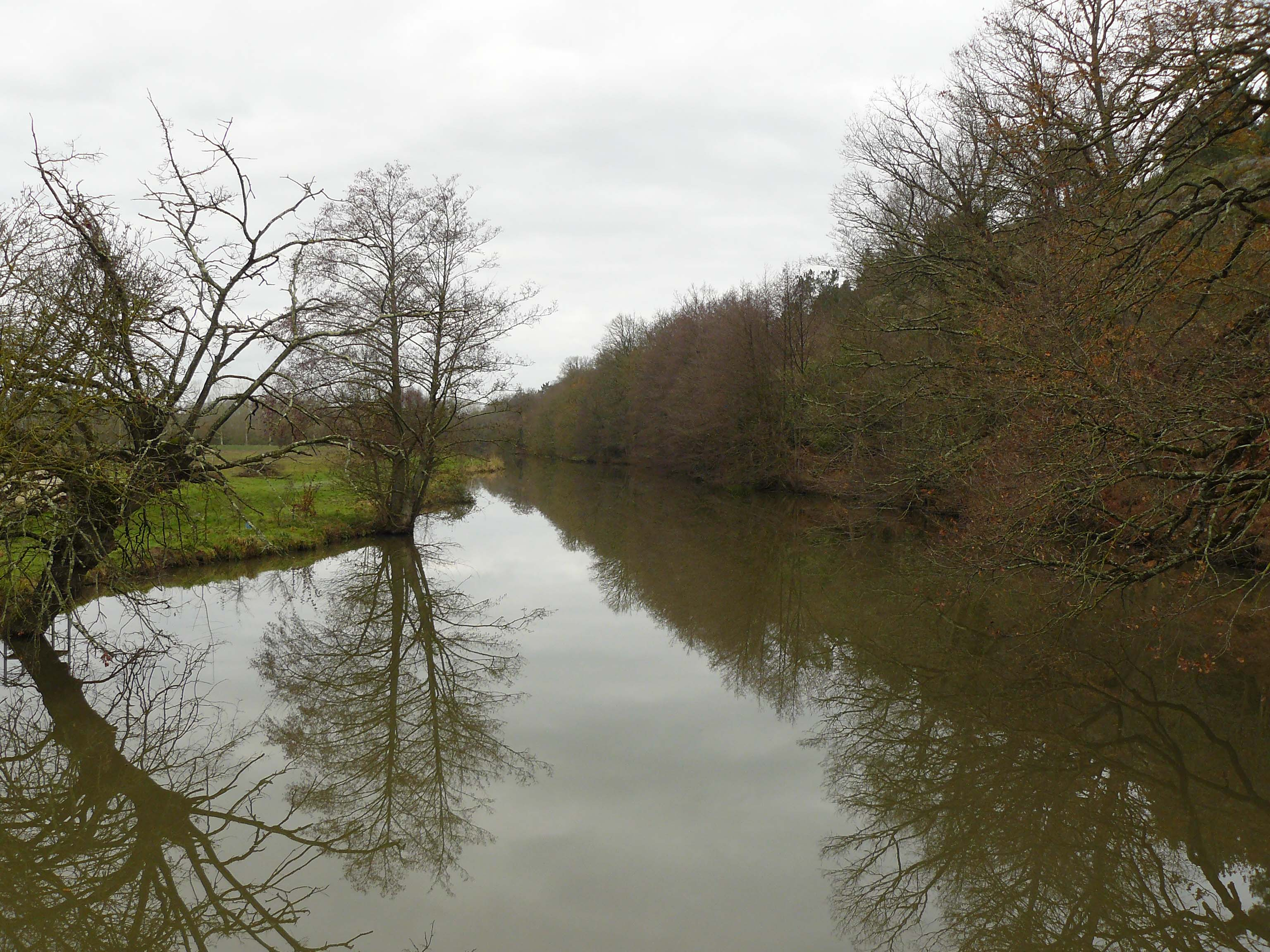

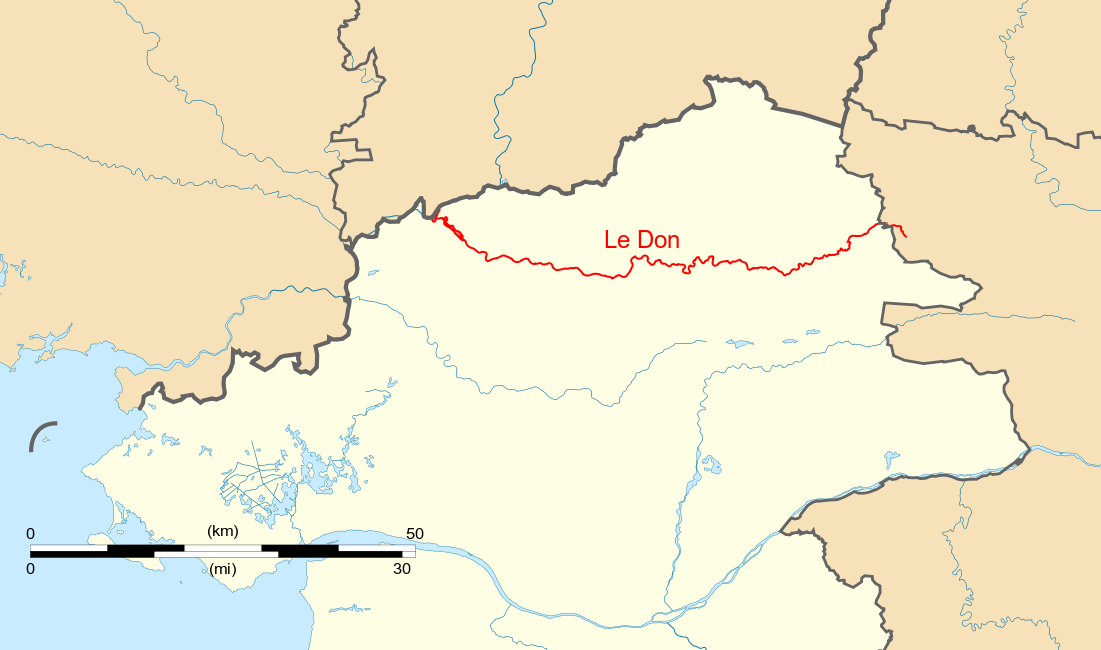
- Map

Location
- Country: France

Physical characteristics
- Source
  - location: Loire-Atlantique
- Mouth
  - location: Vilaine
  - coordinates: 47°40′15″N 1°57′23″W
- Length: 92.1 km (57.2 mi)
- Basin size: 620 km^{2} (240 sq mi)
- Discharge
  - average: 3.77 m^{3}/s (133 cu ft/s)

Basin features
- Progression: Vilaine→ Atlantic Ocean

The Don (French pronunciation: [dɔ̃]) is a river in Brittany, northwestern France. The 92.1 km (57.2 mi) long Don is a tributary of the river Vilaine.

== Geography ==
The river Don rises near Saint-Michel-et-Chanveaux in Maine-et-Loire. The river flows west, passing through the towns of Saint-Julien-de-Vouvantes and Petit-Auverné, where the Little Don joins it. The river flows through the towns of Isse, Treffieux and Jans, where the River Cone joins it. After passing under the RN 137, it continues toward Marsac-sur-Don, Guémené-Penfao and then Massérac, where it empties into the river Vilaine at the border of Loire-Atlantique and the Ille-et-Vilaine.

== Hydrology ==
The Don has a very irregular flow rate over the months, like other tributaries of the Vilaine.

The flow of the Don was observed and documented in a study which took place over a period of 25 years (1983-2007). The results were taken from near the Don's confluence with the Vilaine. It showed that the average annual flow rate was 3.77 cubic meters per second. However, the Don has strong seasonal fluctuations in flow rates, in common with other tributaries of the Valaine, and other rivers of Brittany. The highest waters occur in winter, and are characterized by average monthly rates ranging from 5.95 to 11.7 cubic meters per second. From March, the flow decreases rapidly, to the lowest water in summer from June to mid-October. The results are clearer in the bar graph, below.

Average flow (in cubic metres per second) of the River Don
Monthly averages over a 25-year period (1983 to 2007), taken from near its confluence with the Vilaine

== See also ==
- List of rivers in France
