= Redon Agglomération =

Coordinates: 47.75°N 3.36°W

- Communauté d'agglomération
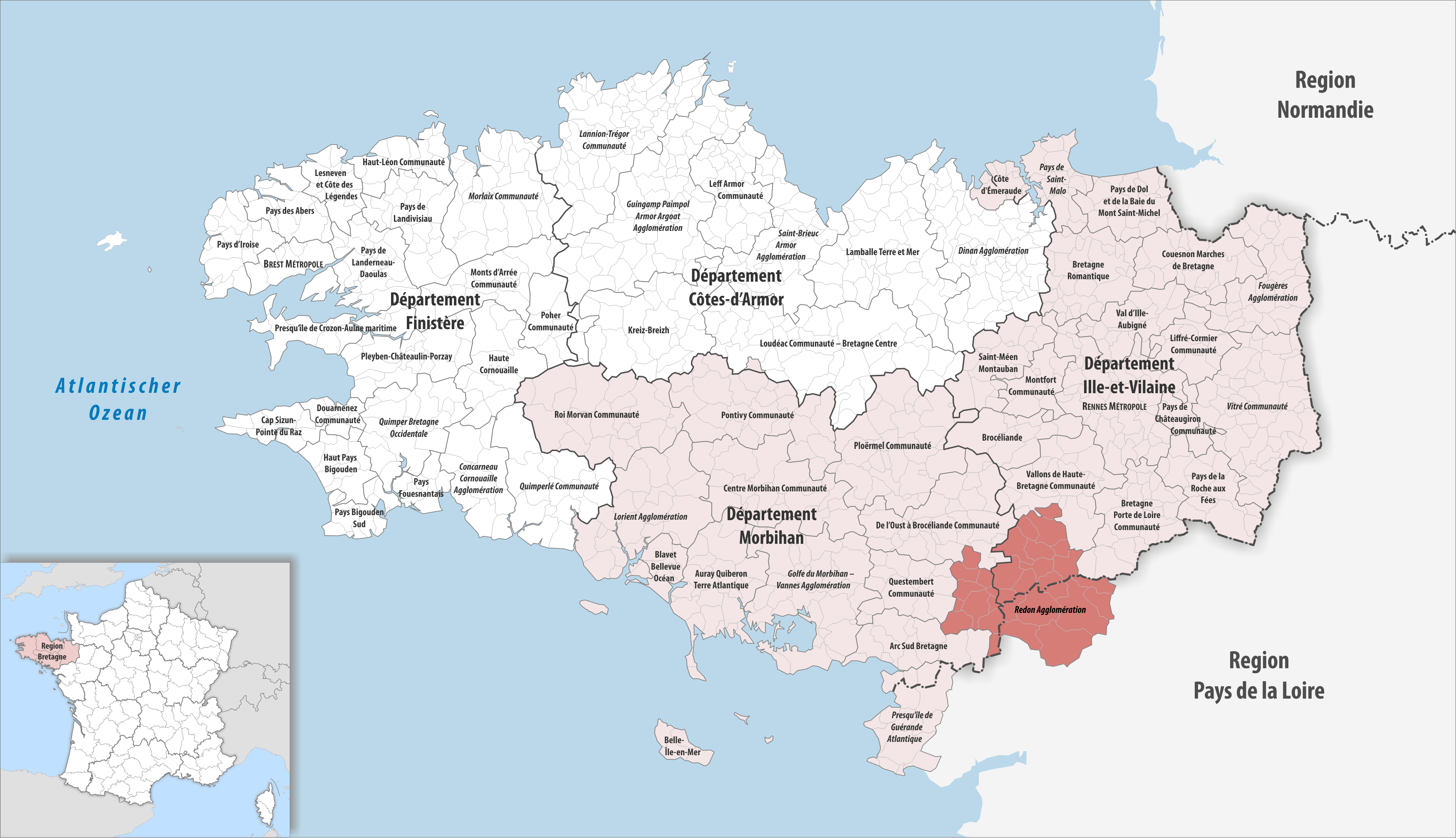
- Country: France
- Region: Brittany, Pays de la Loire
- Department: Ille-et-Vilaine, Loire-Atlantique, Morbihan
- No. of communes: {{{nbcomm}}}
- Established: 1996

Government
  - President: Jean-François Mary
- Area: 990.93 km^{2} (382.60 sq mi)
- Population (2018): 66,478
  - Density: 67.086/km^{2} (173.75/sq mi)
- Website: redon-agglomeration.bzh

Redon Agglomération is a French intercommunal structure centred on the city of Redon. It is located in the departments Morbihan, Ille-et-Vilaine and Loire-Atlantique, in the regions Brittany and Pays de la Loire, northwestern France. It was created in April 1996. Its area is 990.9 km^{2}. Its population was 66,478 in 2018, of which 9,151 in Redon proper.

== History ==
In 1996 the Communauté de communes du Pays de Redon was created. Since 1 January 2018, the intercommunality has become an Agglomeration Community. It is made up of 31 communes: 11 communes are in the Morbihan, 12 in the Ille-et-Vilaine and 8 in the Loire-Atlantique.

== Participants ==
The intercommunality comprises the following 31 communes:

- Allaire, Morbihan
- Avessac
- Bains-sur-Oust
- Béganne
- Bruc-sur-Aff
- La Chapelle-de-Brain
- Conquereuil
- Fégréac
- Les Fougerêts
- Guémené-Penfao
- Langon, Ille-et-Vilaine
- Lieuron
- Massérac
- Peillac
- Pierric
- Pipriac
- Plessé
- Renac
- Redon (seat)
- Rieux, Morbihan
- Saint-Ganton
- Saint-Gorgon, Morbihan
- Saint-Jacut-les-Pins
- Saint-Jean-la-Poterie
- Saint-Just, Ille-et-Vilaine
- Sainte-Marie, Ille-et-Vilaine
- Saint-Nicolas-de-Redon
- Saint-Perreux
- Saint-Vincent-sur-Oust
- Sixt-sur-Aff
- Théhillac

== Competences ==
Redon Agglomération is in charge of a dozen competences:

- Tourism
- Marinas and commercial ports
- Waste collection and treatment
- Creation, development, maintenance and management of industrial, commercial and craft business parks
- Creation, development and maintenance of roads of community interest
- Economic development
- Integration through economic activity
- Development of ICTs
- School transport
- Sociocultural and cultural activities: theatre, media library, conservatory, outdoor activities, swimming pools...
