= Guipry =

Commune in Ille-et-Vilaine, France

Guipry Gwipri
- Part of Guipry-Messac
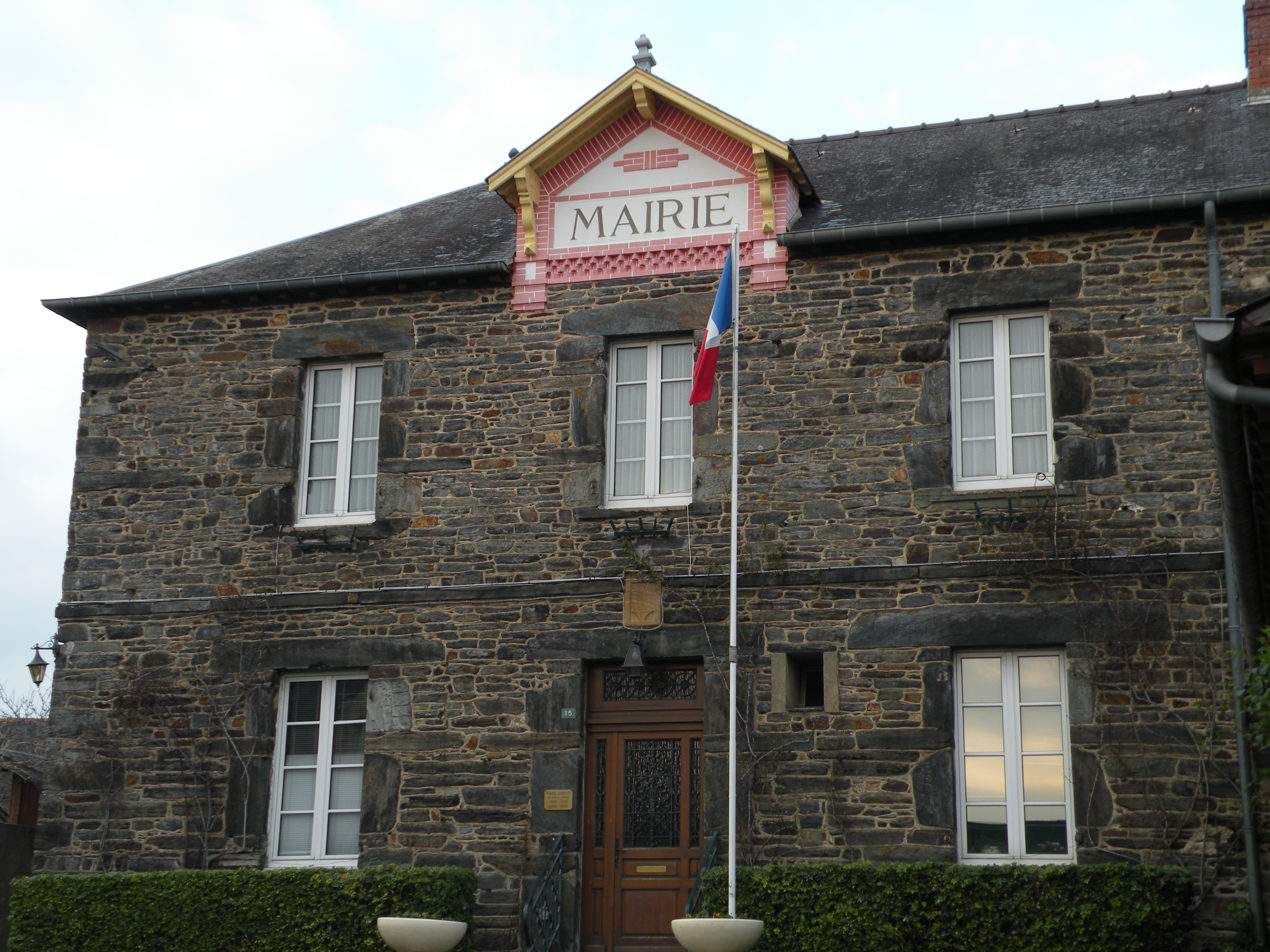
- The town hall in Guipry

- Coat of arms
- Location of Guipry
- Location within France Location within Brittany
- Coordinates: 47°49′32″N 1°50′29″W
- Country: France
- Region: Brittany
- Department: Ille-et-Vilaine
- Arrondissement: Redon
- Canton: Redon
- Commune: Guipry-Messac
- Area^{1}: 50.35 km^{2} (19.44 sq mi)
- Highest elevation: 115 m (377 ft)
- Lowest elevation: 3 m (9.8 ft)
- Population (2018): 3,830
  - Density: 76.1/km^{2} (197/sq mi)
- Time zone: UTC+01:00 (CET)
  - Summer (DST): UTC+02:00 (CEST)
- Postal code: 35480
- ^{1} French Land Register data, which excludes lakes, ponds, glaciers > 1 km^{2} (0.386 sq mi or 247 acres) and river estuaries.

Guipry (French pronunciation: [ɡipʁi]; Breton: Gwipri; Gallo: Gipri) is a former commune in the Ille-et-Vilaine department in Brittany in northwestern France. On 1 January 2016, it was merged into the new commune Guipry-Messac.

== Population ==
Inhabitants of Guipry are called Guipryens in French.

Historical population
Year	Pop.	±% p.a.
1962	2,470	—
1968	2,508	+0.25%
1975	2,460	−0.28%
1982	2,525	+0.37%
1990	2,578	+0.26%
1999	2,991	+1.66%
2006	3,227	+1.09%
2018	3,830	+1.44%
Source: EHESS and INSEE

== See also ==
- Communes of the Ille-et-Vilaine department
