= Lieuron =

Lieuron Luzron (Breton)
- Commune
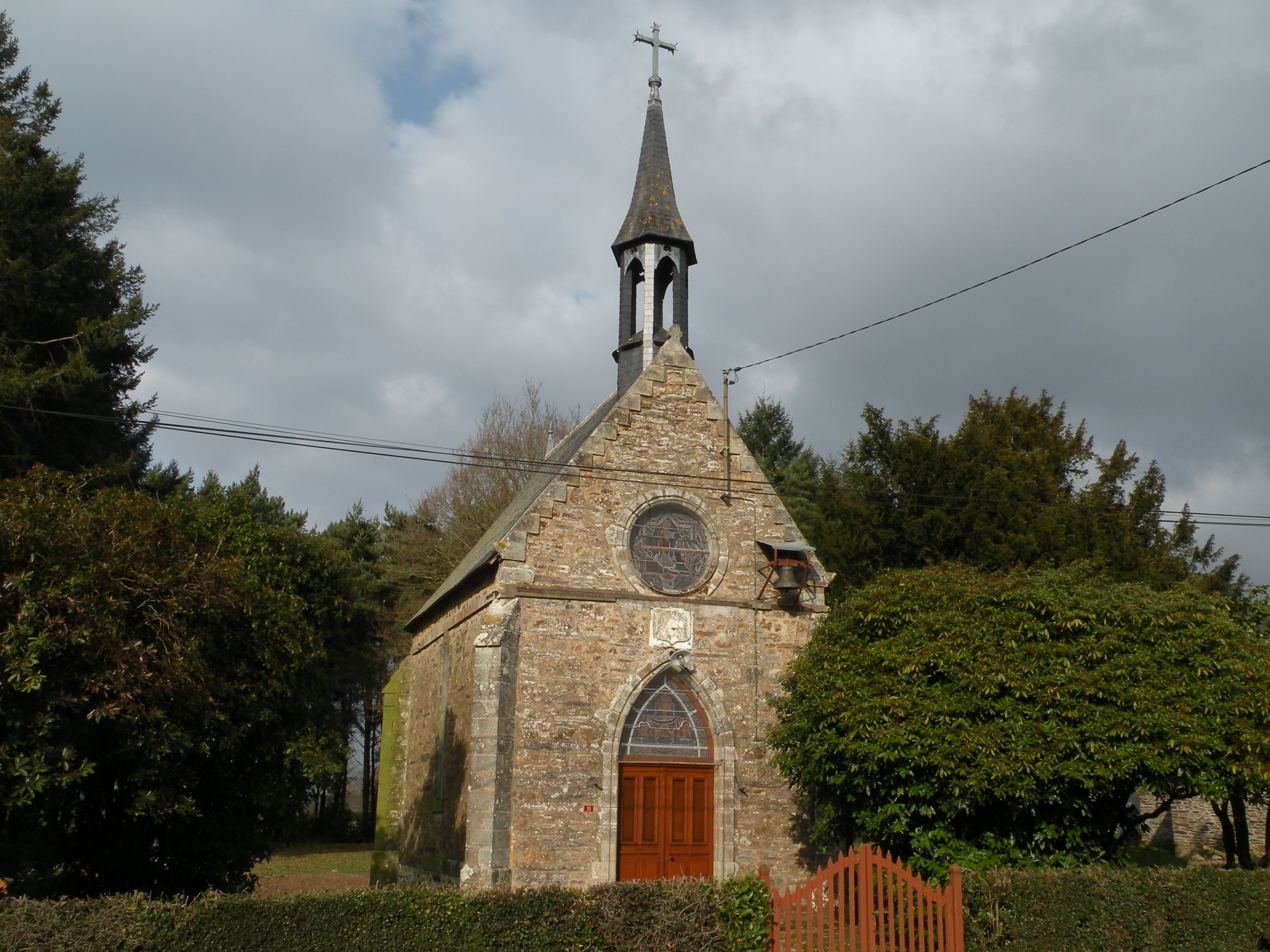
- The chapel of Notre-Dame-des-Sept-Douleurs, in Lieuron
- Location of Lieuron
- Location within France Location within Brittany
- Coordinates: 47°51′07″N 1°56′36″W
- Country: France
- Region: Brittany
- Department: Ille-et-Vilaine
- Arrondissement: Redon
- Canton: Redon
- Intercommunality: Redon Agglomération

Government
  - Mayor (2020–2026): Rose-Line Prévert
- Area^{1}: 16.72 km^{2} (6.46 sq mi)
- Highest elevation: 69 m (226 ft)
- Lowest elevation: 18 m (59 ft)
- Population (2023): 811
  - Density: 48.5/km^{2} (126/sq mi)
- Time zone: UTC+01:00 (CET)
  - Summer (DST): UTC+02:00 (CEST)
- INSEE/Postal code: 35151 /35550
- ^{1} French Land Register data, which excludes lakes, ponds, glaciers > 1 km^{2} (0.386 sq mi or 247 acres) and river estuaries.

Lieuron (French pronunciation: [ljøʁɔ̃]; Breton: Luzron) is a commune in the Ille-et-Vilaine department in Brittany in northwestern France.

== Population ==
Inhabitants of Lieuron are called Lieuronnais in French.

Historical population
Year	Pop.	±% p.a.
1968	555	—
1975	561	+0.15%
1982	526	−0.92%
1990	505	−0.51%
1999	560	+1.16%
2007	677	+2.40%
2012	769	+2.58%
2017	785	+0.41%
2023	811	+0.54%
Source: INSEE

== See also ==
- Communes of the Ille-et-Vilaine department
