= Guipry-Messac =

Guipry-Messac Gwipri-Mezeg (Breton)
- Commune
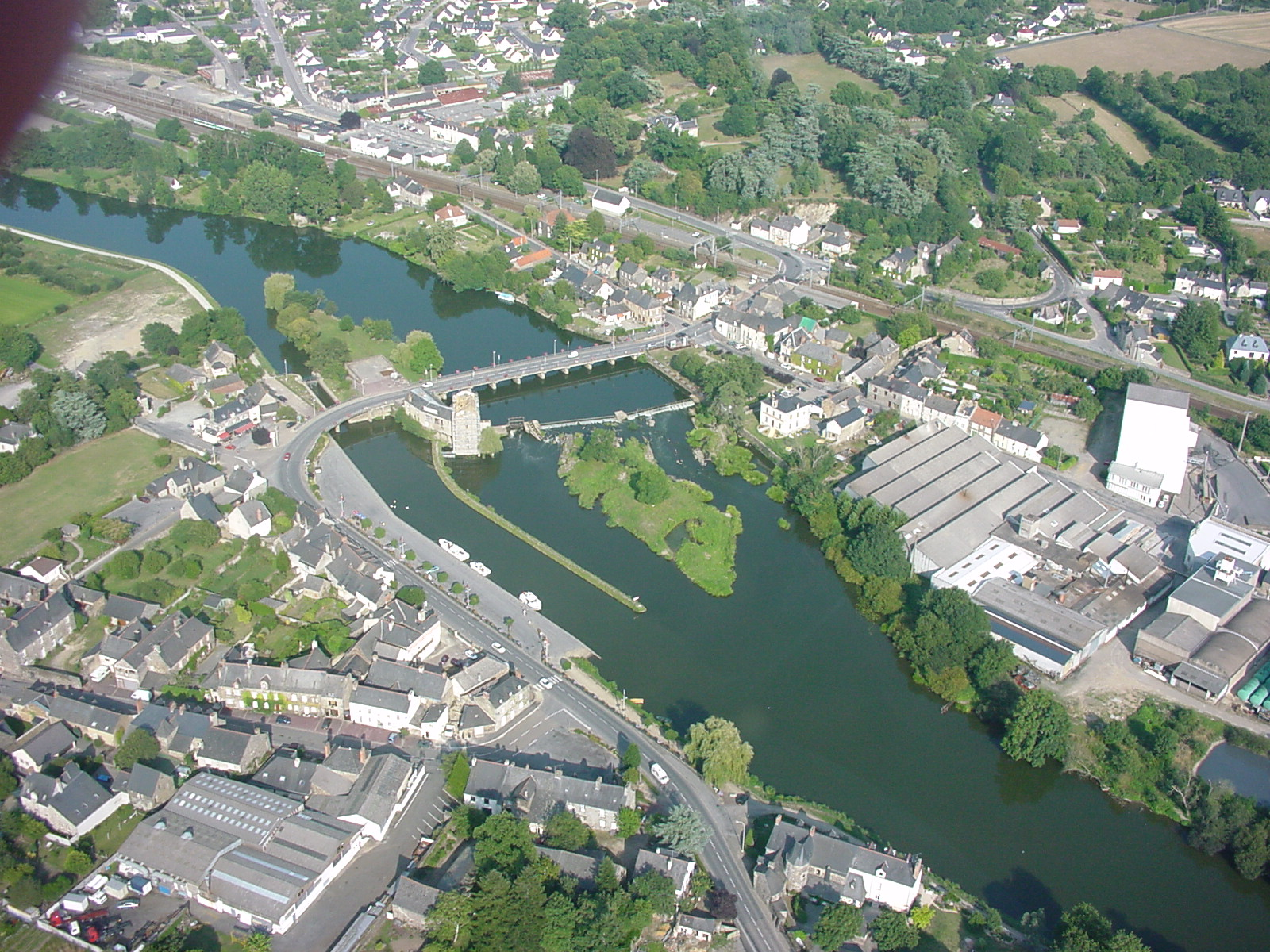
- An aerial view of Guipry-Messac
- Location of Guipry-Messac
- Location within France Location within Brittany
- Coordinates: 47°49′34″N 1°48′25″W
- Country: France
- Region: Brittany
- Department: Ille-et-Vilaine
- Arrondissement: Redon
- Canton: Redon

Government
  - Mayor (2020–2026): Thierry Beaujouan
- Area^{1}: 91.99 km^{2} (35.52 sq mi)
- Population (2023): 7,354
  - Density: 79.94/km^{2} (207.1/sq mi)
- Time zone: UTC+01:00 (CET)
  - Summer (DST): UTC+02:00 (CEST)
- INSEE/Postal code: 35176 /35480
- ^{1} French Land Register data, which excludes lakes, ponds, glaciers > 1 km^{2} (0.386 sq mi or 247 acres) and river estuaries.

Guipry-Messac (French pronunciation: [ɡipʁi mesak]; Breton: Gwipri-Mezeg) is a commune in the Ille-et-Vilaine department of western France. The municipality was established on 1 January 2016 and consists of the former communes of Guipry and Messac.

== Population ==
Population data refer to the commune in its geography as of January 2025.

Historical population
Year	Pop.	±% p.a.
1968	4,677	—
1975	4,672	−0.02%
1982	4,757	+0.26%
1990	4,854	+0.25%
1999	5,234	+0.84%
2007	6,019	+1.76%
2012	6,622	+1.93%
2017	6,961	+1.00%
2023	7,354	+0.92%
Source: INSEE

== See also ==
- Communes of the Ille-et-Vilaine department
