= Marsac-sur-Don =

Marsac-sur-Don Marsac (Gallo) Marzheg (Breton)
- Commune
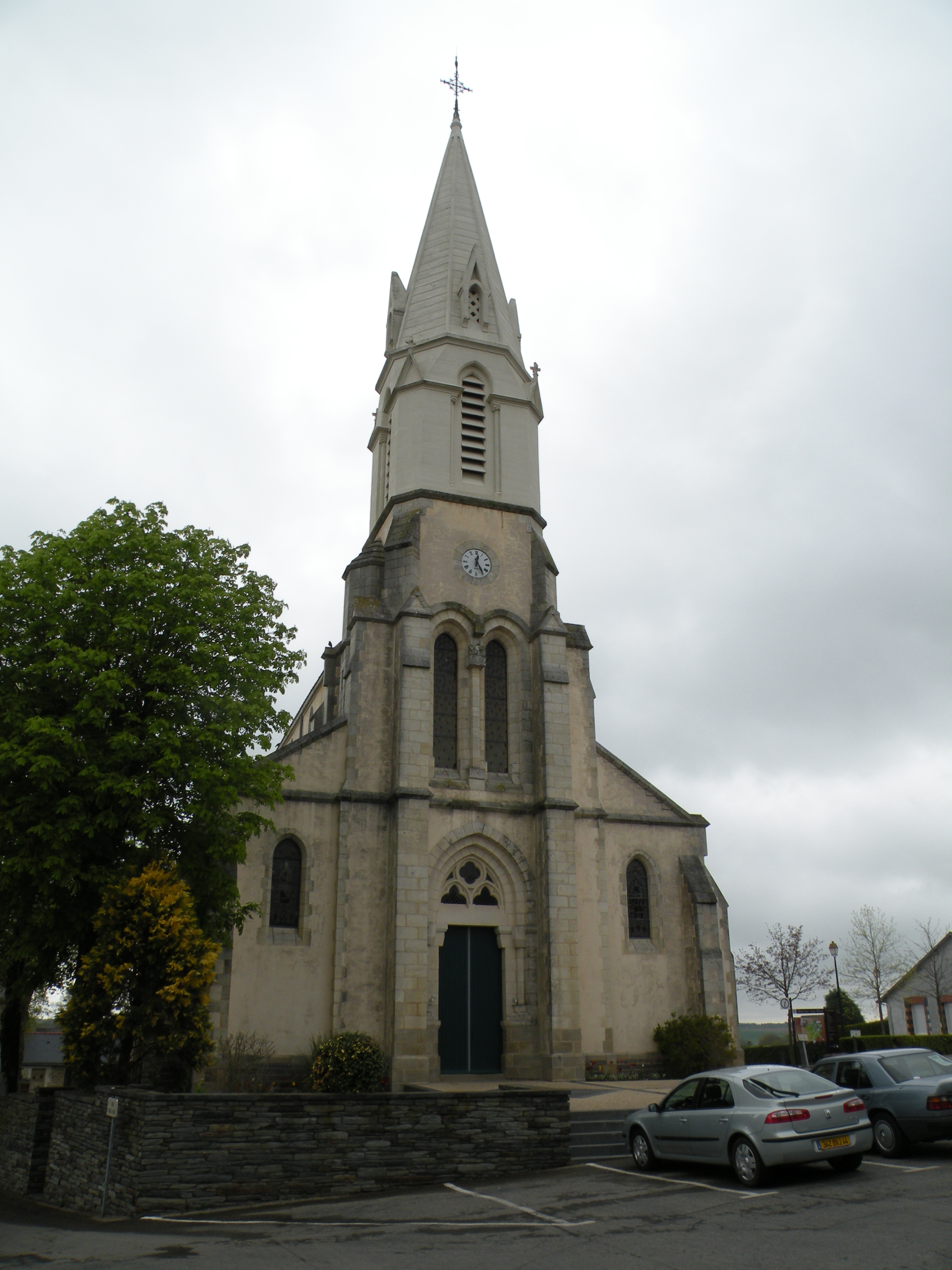

- Coat of arms
- Location of Marsac-sur-Don
- Location within France Location within Pays de la Loire
- Coordinates: 47°35′47″N 1°40′45″W
- Country: France
- Region: Pays de la Loire
- Department: Loire-Atlantique
- Arrondissement: Châteaubriant-Ancenis
- Canton: Guémené-Penfao
- Intercommunality: Châteaubriant-Derval

Government
  - Mayor (2020–2026): Hervé de Trogoff
- Area^{1}: 27.68 km^{2} (10.69 sq mi)
- Highest elevation: 95 m (312 ft)
- Lowest elevation: 11 m (36 ft)
- Population (2023): 1,524
  - Density: 55.06/km^{2} (142.6/sq mi)
- Time zone: UTC+01:00 (CET)
  - Summer (DST): UTC+02:00 (CEST)
- INSEE/Postal code: 44091 /44170
- ^{1} French Land Register data, which excludes lakes, ponds, glaciers > 1 km^{2} (0.386 sq mi or 247 acres) and river estuaries.

Marsac-sur-Don (French pronunciation: [maʁsak syʁ dɔ̃], literally Marsac on Don; Gallo: Marsac, Breton: Marzheg) is a commune in the Loire-Atlantique department in western France.

== Population ==
Historical population
Year	Pop.	±% p.a.
1968	1,227	—
1975	1,166	−0.73%
1982	1,197	+0.38%
1990	1,192	−0.05%
1999	1,200	+0.07%
2007	1,344	+1.43%
2012	1,475	+1.88%
2017	1,507	+0.43%
2023	1,524	+0.19%
Source: INSEE

== See also ==
- Communes of the Loire-Atlantique department
