= Saint-Malo-de-Phily =

Saint-Malo-de-Phily Sant-Maloù-Fili (Breton)
- Commune
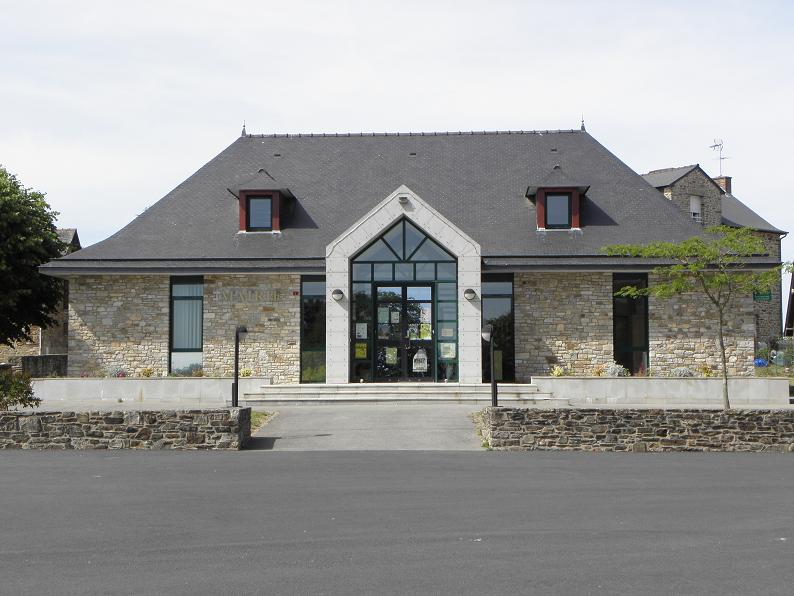
- The town hall of Saint-Malo-de-Phily
- Location of Saint-Malo-de-Phily
- Location within France Location within Brittany
- Coordinates: 47°52′41″N 1°47′14″W
- Country: France
- Region: Brittany
- Department: Ille-et-Vilaine
- Arrondissement: Redon
- Canton: Redon
- Intercommunality: Vallons de Haute-Bretagne

Government
  - Mayor (2020–2026): Marie-Claire Brault
- Area^{1}: 18.77 km^{2} (7.25 sq mi)
- Highest elevation: 114 m (374 ft)
- Lowest elevation: 5 m (16 ft)
- Population (2023): 1,081
  - Density: 57.59/km^{2} (149.2/sq mi)
- Time zone: UTC+01:00 (CET)
  - Summer (DST): UTC+02:00 (CEST)
- INSEE/Postal code: 35289 /35480
- ^{1} French Land Register data, which excludes lakes, ponds, glaciers > 1 km^{2} (0.386 sq mi or 247 acres) and river estuaries.

Saint-Malo-de-Phily (French pronunciation: [sɛ̃ malo də fili]; Breton: Sant-Maloù-Fili) is a commune in the Ille-et-Vilaine department in Brittany in northwestern France. It is about 25 km south of Rennes.

== Population ==
Historical population
Year	Pop.	±% p.a.
1968	659	—
1975	647	−0.26%
1982	637	−0.22%
1990	671	+0.65%
1999	657	−0.23%
2007	804	+2.56%
2012	1,005	+4.56%
2017	1,084	+1.52%
2023	1,081	−0.05%
Source: INSEE

== See also ==
- Communes of the Ille-et-Vilaine department
