= Sixt-sur-Aff =

Sixt-sur-Aff Sitz (Gallo) Seizh (Breton)
- Commune
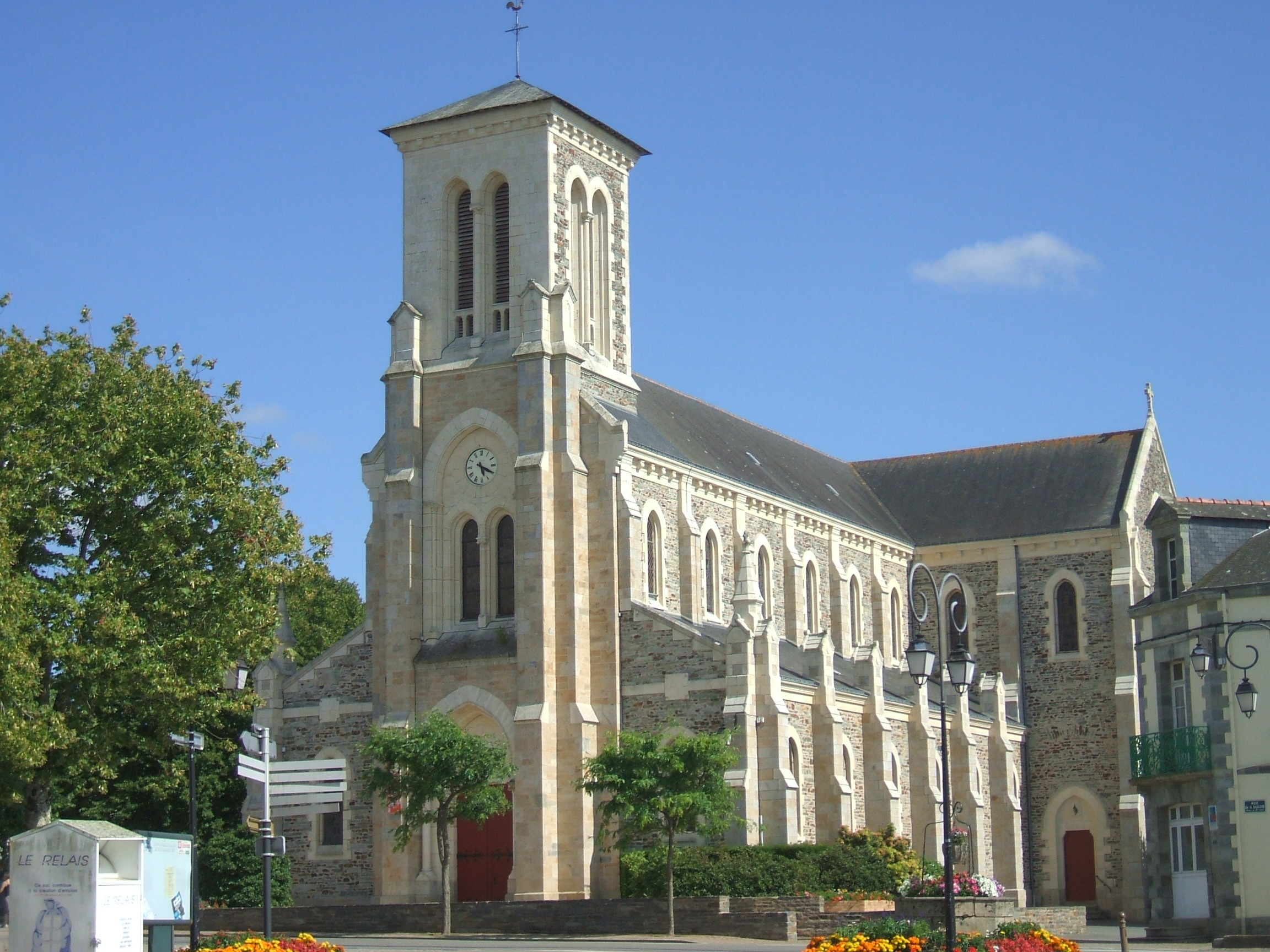
- The church of Sixt-sur-Aff

- Coat of arms
- Location of Sixt-sur-Aff
- Location within France Location within Brittany
- Coordinates: 47°46′36″N 2°04′38″W
- Country: France
- Region: Brittany
- Department: Ille-et-Vilaine
- Arrondissement: Redon
- Canton: Redon
- Intercommunality: Redon Agglomération

Government
  - Mayor (2020–2026): René Riaud
- Area^{1}: 42.50 km^{2} (16.41 sq mi)
- Highest elevation: 92 m (302 ft)
- Lowest elevation: 5 m (16 ft)
- Population (2023): 2,273
  - Density: 53.48/km^{2} (138.5/sq mi)
- Time zone: UTC+01:00 (CET)
  - Summer (DST): UTC+02:00 (CEST)
- INSEE/Postal code: 35328 /35550
- ^{1} French Land Register data, which excludes lakes, ponds, glaciers > 1 km^{2} (0.386 sq mi or 247 acres) and river estuaries.

Sixt-sur-Aff (French pronunciation: [sikst syʁ af], literally Sixt on Aff; Breton: Seizh; Gallo: Sitz) is a commune in the Ille-et-Vilaine department in Brittany in northwestern France.

== Population ==
Inhabitants of Sixt-sur-Aff are called Sixtins in French.

Historical population

Year	Pop.	±% p.a.
1793	1,776	—
1851	1,940	+0.15%
1901	2,456	+0.47%
1906	2,530	+0.60%
1911	2,502	−0.22%
1921	2,241	−1.10%
1926	2,221	−0.18%
1931	2,167	−0.49%
1936	2,112	−0.51%
1946	1,987	−0.61%
1954	1,944	−0.27%

Year	Pop.	±% p.a.
1962	1,838	−0.70%
1968	1,722	−1.08%
1975	1,713	−0.07%
1982	1,848	+1.09%
1990	1,885	+0.25%
1999	1,915	+0.18%
2007	2,069	+0.97%
2012	2,120	+0.49%
2017	2,129	+0.08%
2023	2,273	+1.10%

Source: EHESS and INSEE (1968-2023)

== See also ==
- Communes of the Ille-et-Vilaine department
