= Saint-Ganton =

Saint-Ganton Saent-Ganton (Gallo) Sant-Weganton (Breton)
- Commune
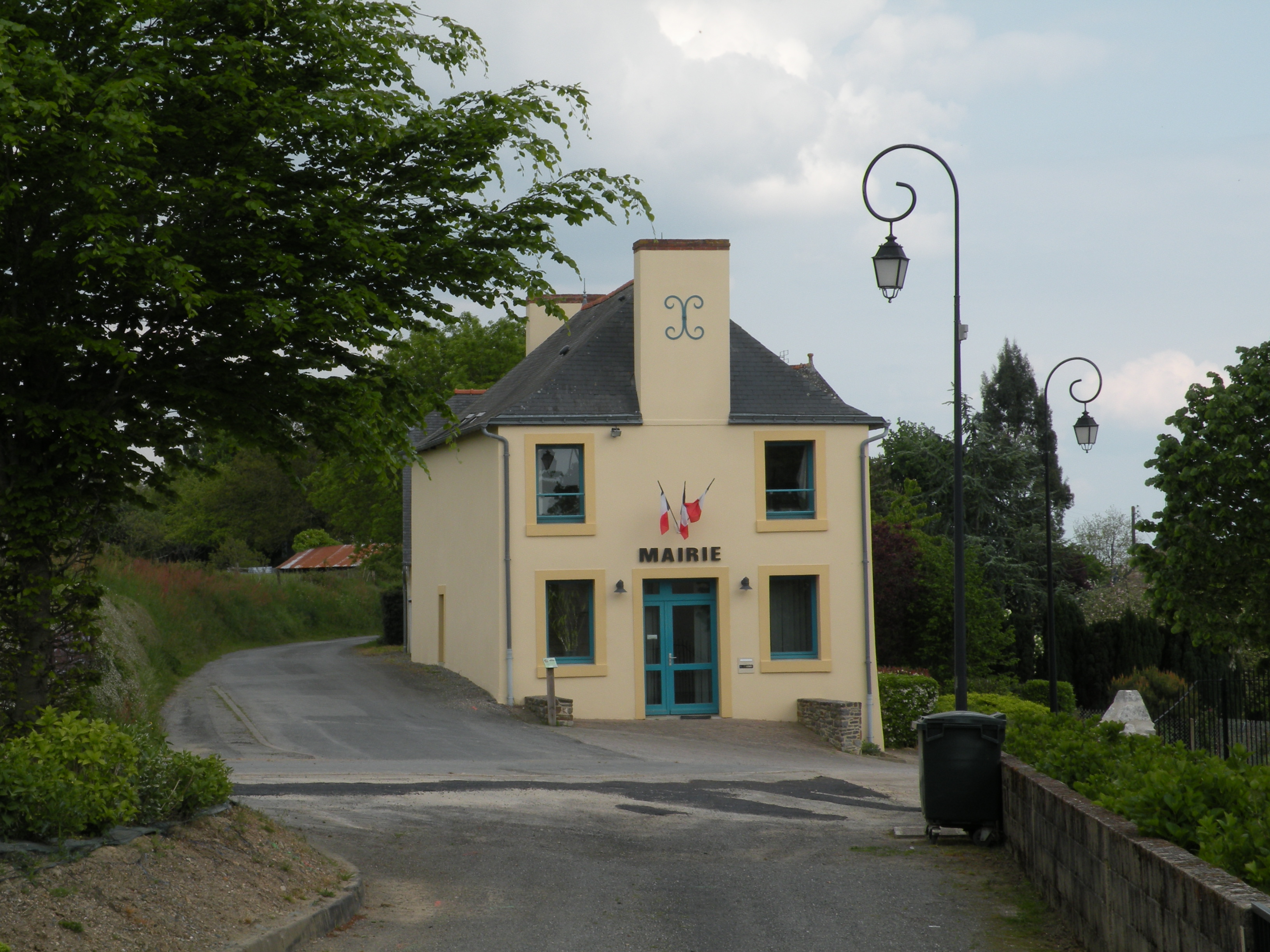
- The town hall of Saint-Ganton
- Location of Saint-Ganton
- Location within France Location within Brittany
- Coordinates: 47°45′57″N 1°53′20″W
- Country: France
- Region: Brittany
- Department: Ille-et-Vilaine
- Arrondissement: Redon
- Canton: Redon
- Intercommunality: Redon Agglomération

Government
  - Mayor (2020–2026): Fabienne Cottais
- Area^{1}: 14.08 km^{2} (5.44 sq mi)
- Highest elevation: 102 m (335 ft)
- Lowest elevation: 25 m (82 ft)
- Population (2023): 413
  - Density: 29.3/km^{2} (76.0/sq mi)
- Time zone: UTC+01:00 (CET)
  - Summer (DST): UTC+02:00 (CEST)
- INSEE/Postal code: 35268 /35550
- ^{1} French Land Register data, which excludes lakes, ponds, glaciers > 1 km^{2} (0.386 sq mi or 247 acres) and river estuaries.

Saint-Ganton (French pronunciation: [sɛ̃ ɡɑ̃tɔ̃]; Gallo: Saent-Ganton, Breton: Sant-Weganton) is a commune in the Ille-et-Vilaine department in Brittany in northwestern France.

== Population ==
Historical population
Year	Pop.	±% p.a.
1968	490	—
1975	461	−0.87%
1982	405	−1.83%
1990	381	−0.76%
1999	388	+0.20%
2007	415	+0.84%
2012	415	+0.00%
2017	424	+0.43%
2023	413	−0.44%
Source: INSEE

== See also ==
- Communes of the Ille-et-Vilaine department
- Jean-Marie Valentin

== See also ==
Mill of the tomb
