= Bruc-sur-Aff =

Bruc-sur-Aff Bruc (Gallo) Brug (Breton)
- Commune
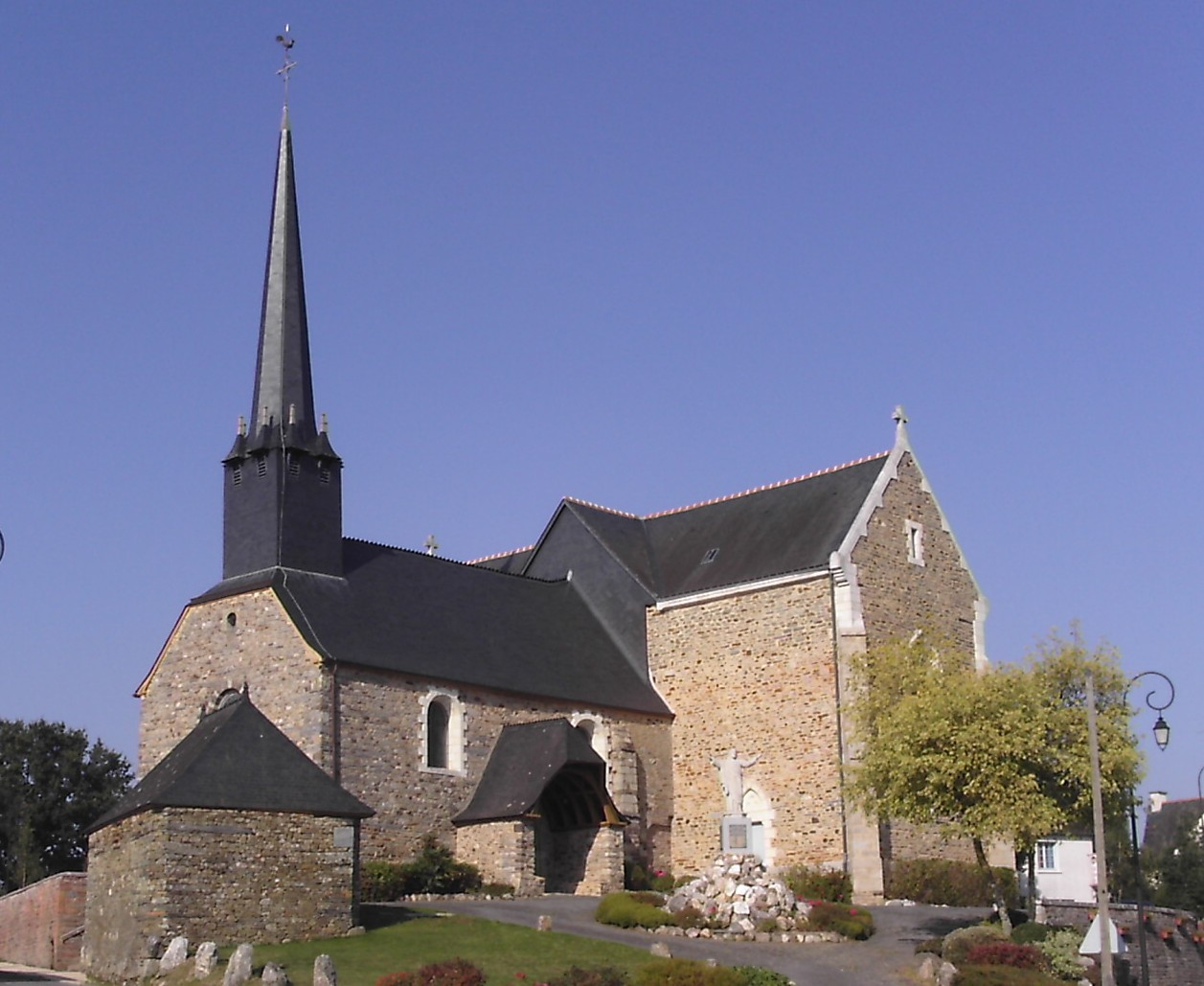
- Church of Saint Michel
- Location of Bruc-sur-Aff
- Location within France Location within Brittany
- Coordinates: 47°48′56″N 2°01′03″W
- Country: France
- Region: Brittany
- Department: Ille-et-Vilaine
- Arrondissement: Redon
- Canton: Redon
- Intercommunality: Redon Agglomération

Government
  - Mayor (2020–2026): Philippe Eslan
- Area^{1}: 21.23 km^{2} (8.20 sq mi)
- Highest elevation: 84 m (276 ft)
- Lowest elevation: 12 m (39 ft)
- Population (2023): 855
  - Density: 40.3/km^{2} (104/sq mi)
- Time zone: UTC+01:00 (CET)
  - Summer (DST): UTC+02:00 (CEST)
- INSEE/Postal code: 35045 /35550
- ^{1} French Land Register data, which excludes lakes, ponds, glaciers > 1 km^{2} (0.386 sq mi or 247 acres) and river estuaries.

Bruc-sur-Aff (French pronunciation: [bʁyk syʁ af], literally Bruc on Aff; Breton: Brug; Gallo: Bruc) is a commune in the Ille-et-Vilaine department in Brittany in northwestern France.

== Population ==
Inhabitants of Bruc-sur-Aff are called Bruçois in French.

Historical population
Year	Pop.	±% p.a.
1968	822	—
1975	805	−0.30%
1982	792	−0.23%
1990	778	−0.22%
1999	775	−0.04%
2007	839	+1.00%
2012	855	+0.38%
2017	863	+0.19%
2023	855	−0.16%
Source: INSEE

== See also ==
- Communes of the Ille-et-Vilaine department
