= Massérac =

Massérac Macérac (Gallo) Merzhereg (Breton)
- Commune
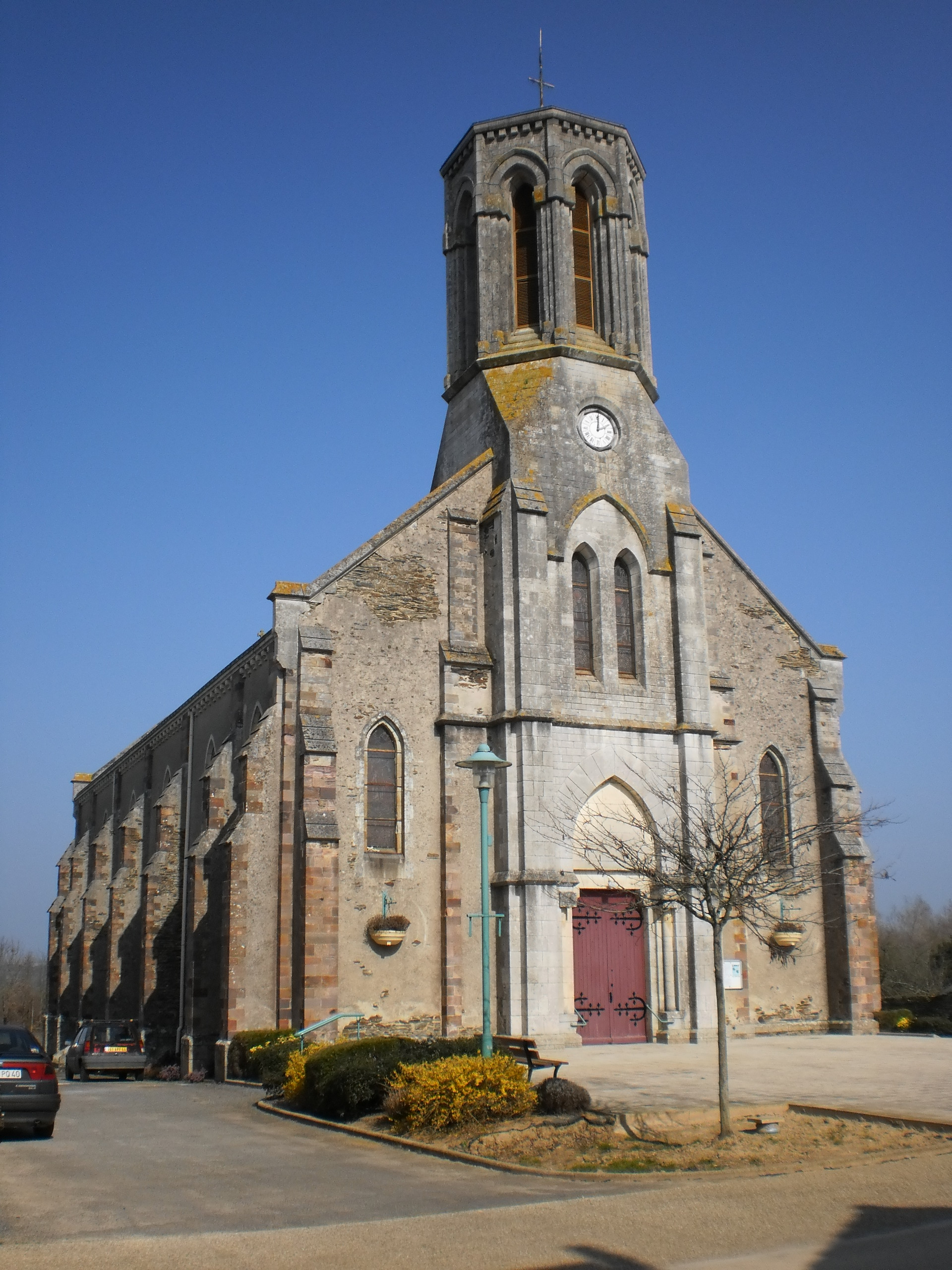

- Coat of arms
- Location of Massérac
- Location within France Location within Pays de la Loire
- Coordinates: 47°40′25″N 1°54′48″W
- Country: France
- Region: Pays de la Loire
- Department: Loire-Atlantique
- Arrondissement: Châteaubriant-Ancenis
- Canton: Guémené-Penfao
- Intercommunality: Redon Agglomération

Government
  - Mayor (2020–2026): Fabrice Sanchez
- Area^{1}: 18.78 km^{2} (7.25 sq mi)
- Highest elevation: 55 m (180 ft)
- Lowest elevation: 0 m (0 ft)
- Population (2023): 665
  - Density: 35.4/km^{2} (91.7/sq mi)
- Time zone: UTC+01:00 (CET)
  - Summer (DST): UTC+02:00 (CEST)
- INSEE/Postal code: 44092 /44290
- Website: https://masserac.bzh/
- ^{1} French Land Register data, which excludes lakes, ponds, glaciers > 1 km^{2} (0.386 sq mi or 247 acres) and river estuaries.

Massérac (French pronunciation: [maseʁak]; Gallo: Macérac, Breton: Merzhereg) is a commune in the Loire-Atlantique department in western France.

== Population ==
Historical population
Year	Pop.	±% p.a.
1968	571	—
1975	509	−1.63%
1982	507	−0.06%
1990	510	+0.07%
1999	449	−1.41%
2007	592	+3.52%
2012	687	+3.02%
2017	691	+0.12%
2023	665	−0.64%
Source: INSEE

== See also ==
- Communes of the Loire-Atlantique department
