= Sainte-Marie, Ille-et-Vilaine =

Sainte-Marie Lokmaria-Redon (Breton)
- Commune
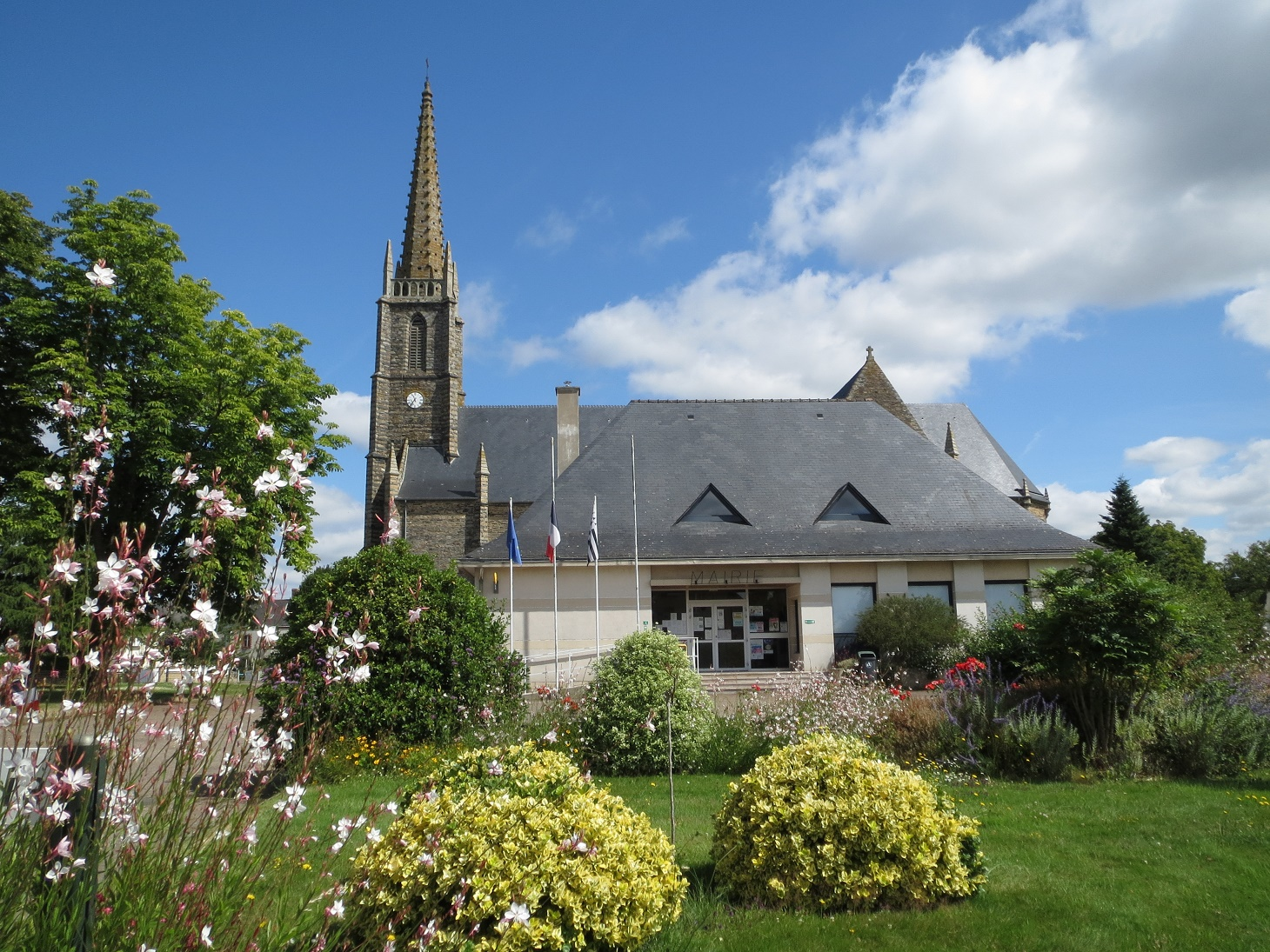
- The town hall and church of Sainte-Marie
- Location of Sainte-Marie
- Location within France Location within Brittany
- Coordinates: 47°41′41″N 1°59′58″W
- Country: France
- Region: Brittany
- Department: Ille-et-Vilaine
- Arrondissement: Redon
- Canton: Redon
- Intercommunality: Redon Agglomération

Government
  - Mayor (2020–2026): Françoise Boussekey
- Area^{1}: 25.28 km^{2} (9.76 sq mi)
- Highest elevation: 68 m (223 ft)
- Lowest elevation: 0 m (0 ft)
- Population (2023): 2,247
  - Density: 88.88/km^{2} (230.2/sq mi)
- Time zone: UTC+01:00 (CET)
  - Summer (DST): UTC+02:00 (CEST)
- INSEE/Postal code: 35294 /35600
- ^{1} French Land Register data, which excludes lakes, ponds, glaciers > 1 km^{2} (0.386 sq mi or 247 acres) and river estuaries.

Sainte-Marie (French pronunciation: [sɛ̃t maʁi]; Breton: Lokmaria-Redon) is a commune in the Ille-et-Vilaine department in Brittany in northwestern France.

== Population ==
Inhabitants of Sainte-Marie are called samaritains in French.

Historical population
Year	Pop.	±% p.a.
1968	1,183	—
1975	1,296	+1.31%
1982	1,555	+2.64%
1990	1,692	+1.06%
1999	1,759	+0.43%
2007	2,168	+2.65%
2012	2,319	+1.36%
2017	2,249	−0.61%
2023	2,247	−0.01%
Source: INSEE

== See also ==
- Communes of the Ille-et-Vilaine department
