= Guémené-Penfao =

Guémené-Penfao Gemenae (Gallo) Gwenvenez-Penfaou (Breton)
- Commune
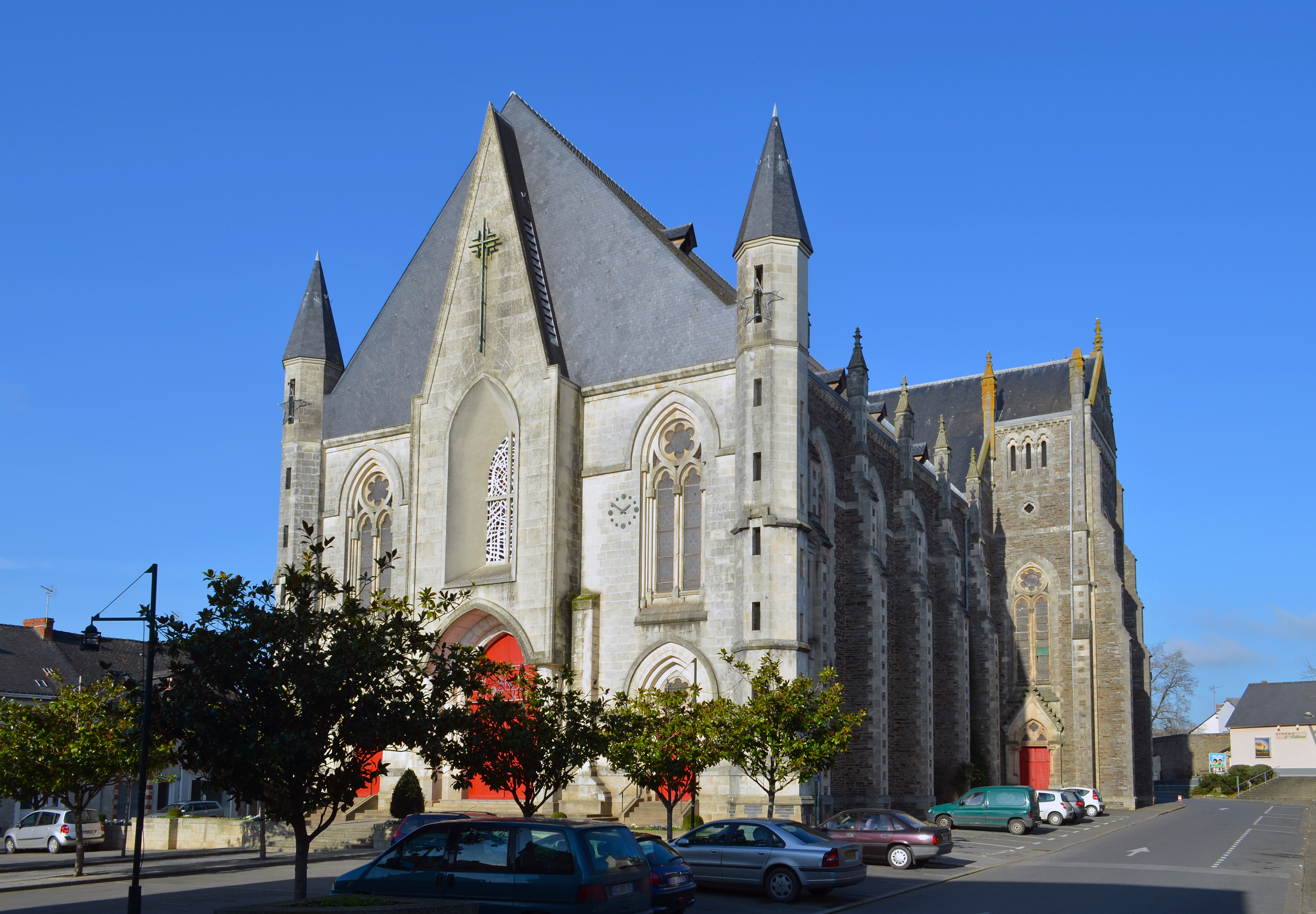
- The church in Guémené-Penfao

- Coat of arms
- Location of Guémené-Penfao
- Location within France Location within Pays de la Loire
- Coordinates: 47°37′51″N 1°49′53″W
- Country: France
- Region: Pays de la Loire
- Department: Loire-Atlantique
- Arrondissement: Châteaubriant-Ancenis
- Canton: Guémené-Penfao
- Intercommunality: Redon Agglomération

Government
  - Mayor (2020–2026): Isabelle Barathon-Bazelle
- Area^{1}: 105.51 km^{2} (40.74 sq mi)
- Highest elevation: 83 m (272 ft)
- Lowest elevation: 2 m (6.6 ft)
- Population (2023): 5,243
  - Density: 49.69/km^{2} (128.7/sq mi)
- Time zone: UTC+01:00 (CET)
  - Summer (DST): UTC+02:00 (CEST)
- INSEE/Postal code: 44067 /44290
- ^{1} French Land Register data, which excludes lakes, ponds, glaciers > 1 km^{2} (0.386 sq mi or 247 acres) and river estuaries.

Guémené-Penfao (French pronunciation: [ɡemne pɛ̃fo]; Gallo: Gemenae, Breton: Gwenvenez-Penfaou) is a commune in the Loire-Atlantique department in western France, north of Nantes. The commune is widespread and includes the former communes of Beslé-sur-Vilaine and Guénouvry.

Its name comes from the Breton language: "gwen" (white), "menez" (hill, mountain), "pen" (head), and "faou" (beech tree). The main economic activity is agriculture.

== Population ==
Historical population

Year	Pop.	±% p.a.
1793	3,383	—
1800	3,585	+0.83%
1806	3,436	−0.71%
1821	3,634	+0.37%
1831	3,798	+0.44%
1841	4,013	+0.55%
1846	4,328	+1.52%
1851	4,630	+1.36%
1856	4,679	+0.21%
1861	4,977	+1.24%
1866	5,637	+2.52%
1872	5,923	+0.83%
1876	6,167	+1.01%
1881	6,566	+1.26%
1886	6,766	+0.60%
1891	6,812	+0.14%
1896	6,765	−0.14%
1901	6,738	−0.08%

Year	Pop.	±% p.a.
1906	6,762	+0.07%
1911	6,497	−0.80%
1921	5,982	−0.82%
1926	5,922	−0.20%
1931	5,697	−0.77%
1936	5,608	−0.31%
1946	5,527	−0.15%
1954	5,331	−0.45%
1962	5,189	−0.34%
1968	4,977	−0.69%
1975	4,590	−1.15%
1982	4,476	−0.36%
1990	4,464	−0.03%
1999	4,572	+0.27%
2007	4,920	+0.92%
2012	5,209	+1.15%
2017	5,200	−0.03%
2023	5,243	+0.14%

Source: EHESS and INSEE (1968-2023)

== See also ==
- Communes of the Loire-Atlantique department
