= Saint-Just, Ille-et-Vilaine =

Saint-Just Saent-Just (Gallo) Sant-Yust (Breton)
- Commune
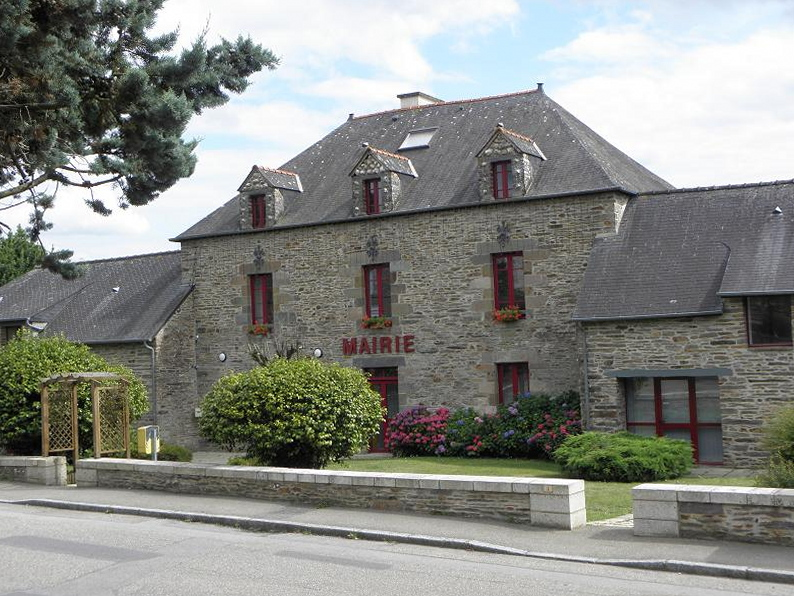
- The town hall of Saint-Just
- Location of Saint-Just
- Location within France Location within Brittany
- Coordinates: 47°45′59″N 1°57′36″W
- Country: France
- Region: Brittany
- Department: Ille-et-Vilaine
- Arrondissement: Redon
- Canton: Redon
- Intercommunality: Redon Agglomération

Government
  - Mayor (2020–2026): Daniel Mahé
- Area^{1}: 28.05 km^{2} (10.83 sq mi)
- Highest elevation: 94 m (308 ft)
- Lowest elevation: 8 m (26 ft)
- Population (2023): 1,107
  - Density: 39.47/km^{2} (102.2/sq mi)
- Time zone: UTC+01:00 (CET)
  - Summer (DST): UTC+02:00 (CEST)
- INSEE/Postal code: 35285 /35550
- ^{1} French Land Register data, which excludes lakes, ponds, glaciers > 1 km^{2} (0.386 sq mi or 247 acres) and river estuaries.

Saint-Just (French pronunciation: [sɛ̃ ʒyst]; Breton: Sant-Yust; Gallo: Saent-Just) is a commune in the Ille-et-Vilaine department of Brittany in northwestern France.

== Population ==
Historical population
Year	Pop.	±% p.a.
1968	1,120	—
1975	1,121	+0.01%
1982	1,024	−1.28%
1990	997	−0.33%
1999	929	−0.78%
2007	1,013	+1.09%
2012	1,082	+1.33%
2017	1,065	−0.32%
2023	1,107	+0.65%
Source: INSEE

== See also ==
- Communes of the Ille-et-Vilaine department
