= Mill of the tomb =

Windmill in Brittany, France

Coordinates: 47°46′45″N 1°53′12″W

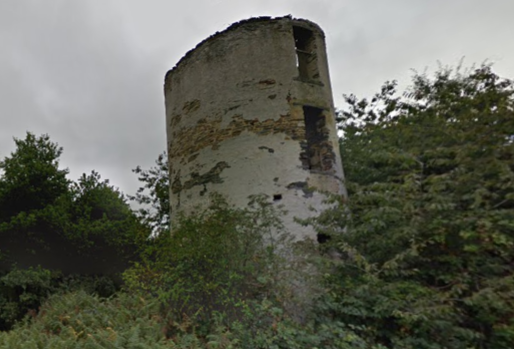
Mill of the tomb

The Mill of the tomb is a windmill located in Brittany, in the department of Ille-et-Vilaine, in the commune of Saint-Ganton at a place called Gominé.

== Legend ==
According to legend, the miller's wife was a beautiful woman who seduced men, generously offering them her company during the absences of her husband, busy delivering his flour. Unfortunately, the young and attractive miller's wife died prematurely. Some said she had exhausted herself through her devotion, while others whispered that the miller, consumed by jealousy, had fatally stabbed her. No funeral tributes were paid. In front of the entrance to the mill, the miller dug a grave to bury his wife. The peasants who crossed the threshold were unaware that they were trampling on the remains of the beautiful miller. Since then the mill has been known as the "Mill of the tomb".

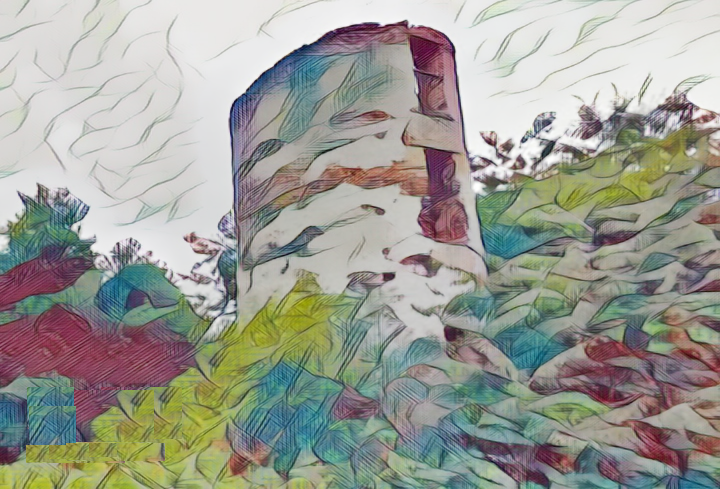
Mill of the tomb - Aquarelle.

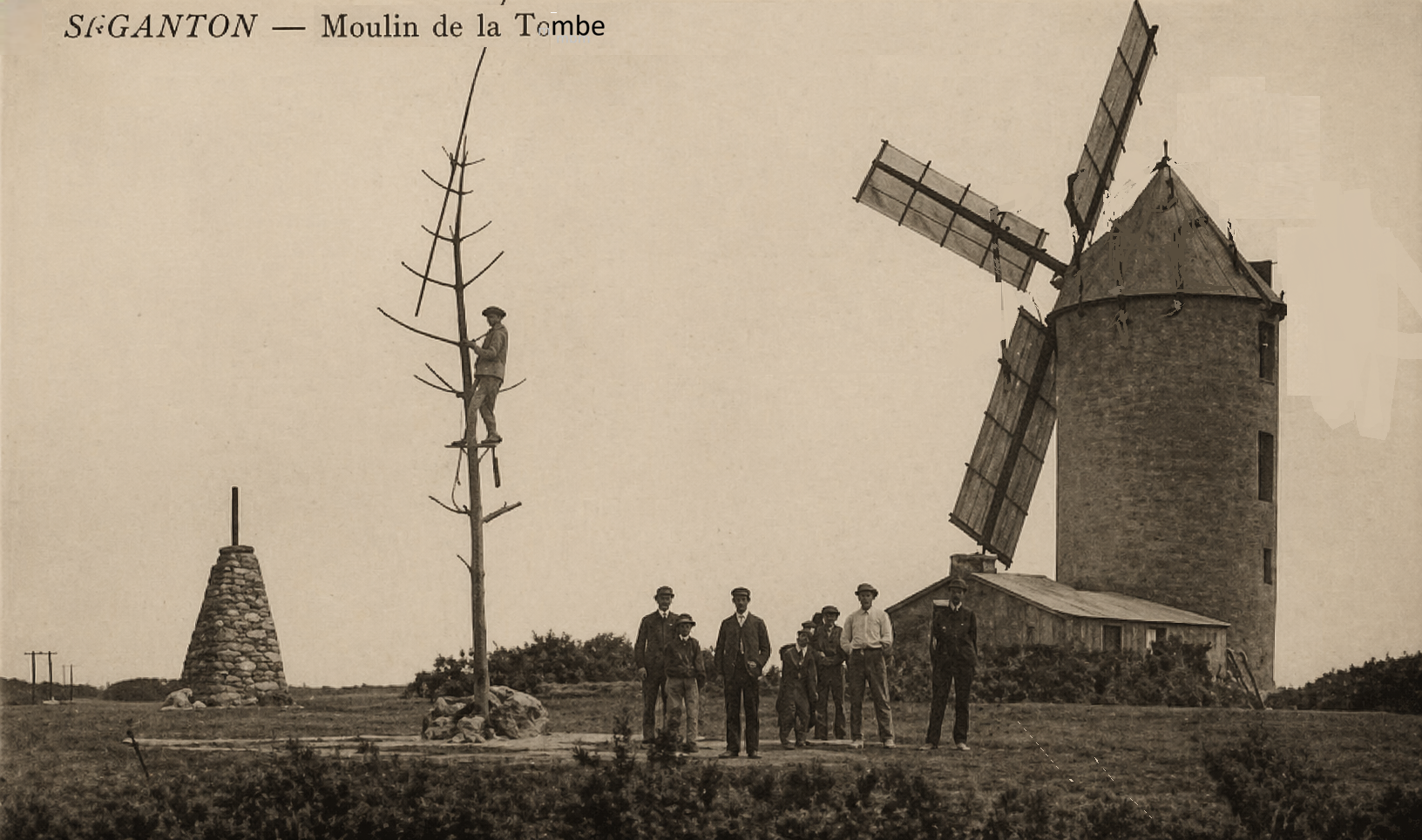
Mill of the tomb - Saint-Ganton - 1910.
