= Pipriac =

Pipriac Pisperiac (Gallo) Presperieg (Breton)
- Commune
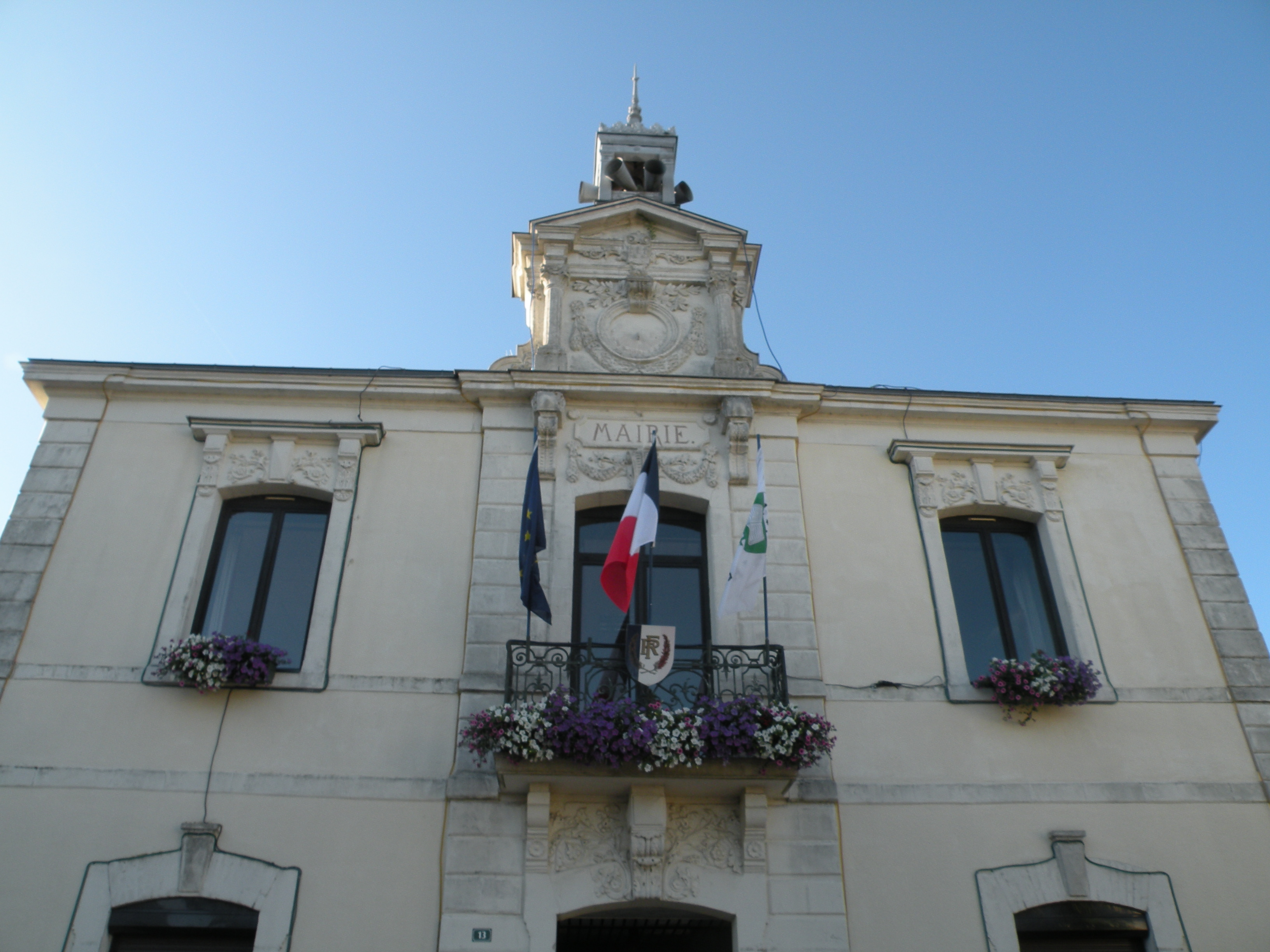
- The town hall of Pipriac

- Coat of arms
- Location of Pipriac
- Location within France Location within Brittany
- Coordinates: 47°48′36″N 1°56′47″W
- Country: France
- Region: Brittany
- Department: Ille-et-Vilaine
- Arrondissement: Redon
- Canton: Redon
- Intercommunality: Redon Agglomération

Government
  - Mayor (2020–2026): Franck Pichot
- Area^{1}: 48.65 km^{2} (18.78 sq mi)
- Highest elevation: 98 m (322 ft)
- Lowest elevation: 14 m (46 ft)
- Population (2023): 3,859
  - Density: 79.32/km^{2} (205.4/sq mi)
- Time zone: UTC+01:00 (CET)
  - Summer (DST): UTC+02:00 (CEST)
- INSEE/Postal code: 35219 /35550
- ^{1} French Land Register data, which excludes lakes, ponds, glaciers > 1 km^{2} (0.386 sq mi or 247 acres) and river estuaries.

Pipriac (French pronunciation: [pipʁijak]; Breton: Presperieg, Gallo: Piperia) is a commune in the Ille-et-Vilaine department in Brittany in northwestern France.

It lies 35 km (22 mi) southwest of Rennes.

== Population ==
Inhabitants of Pipriac are called Pipriatains in French.

Historical population
Year	Pop.	±% p.a.
1968	2,848	—
1975	2,669	−0.92%
1982	2,669	+0.00%
1990	2,772	+0.47%
1999	2,912	+0.55%
2007	3,253	+1.39%
2012	3,658	+2.37%
2017	3,745	+0.47%
2023	3,859	+0.50%
Source: INSEE

== International relations ==
Pipriac is twinned with the village of Whitland in Carmarthenshire, Wales.

== See also ==
- Communes of the Ille-et-Vilaine department
