= Messac, Ille-et-Vilaine =

Commune in Brittany, France

Messac Mezeg
- Part of Guipry-Messac
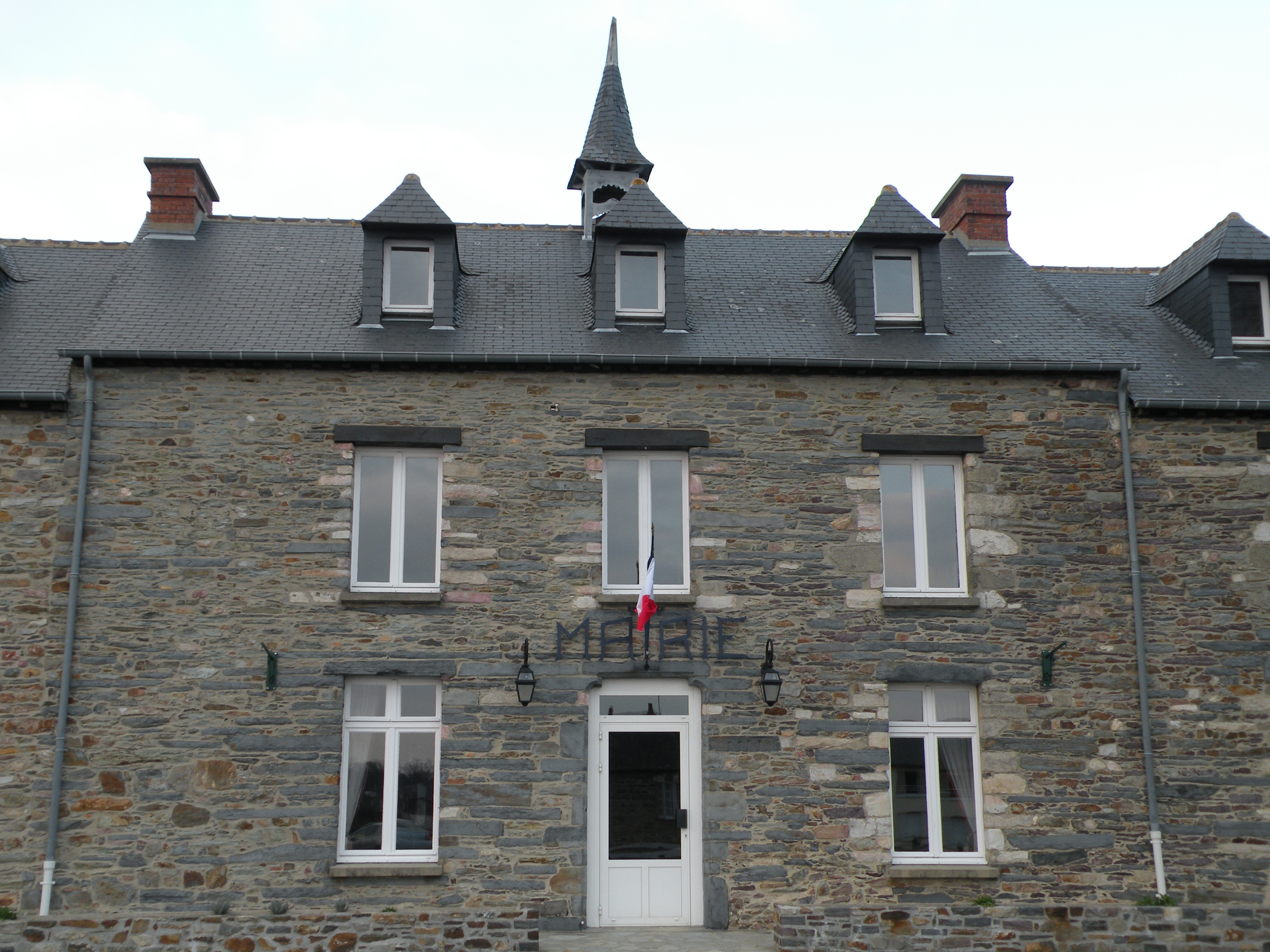
- The town hall of Messac

- Coat of arms
- Location of Messac
- Location within France Location within Brittany
- Coordinates: 47°49′32″N 1°48′26″W
- Country: France
- Region: Brittany
- Department: Ille-et-Vilaine
- Arrondissement: Redon
- Canton: Redon
- Commune: Guipry-Messac
- Area^{1}: 41.64 km^{2} (16.08 sq mi)
- Highest elevation: 89 m (292 ft)
- Lowest elevation: 3 m (9.8 ft)
- Population (2018): 3,204
  - Density: 76.95/km^{2} (199.3/sq mi)
- Time zone: UTC+01:00 (CET)
  - Summer (DST): UTC+02:00 (CEST)
- Postal code: 35480
- ^{1} French Land Register data, which excludes lakes, ponds, glaciers > 1 km^{2} (0.386 sq mi or 247 acres) and river estuaries.

Messac (French pronunciation: [mesak]; Breton: Mezeg; Gallo: Meczac) is a former commune in the Ille-et-Vilaine department of Brittany in northwestern France. On 1 January 2016, it was merged into the new commune Guipry-Messac.

== Population ==
Inhabitants of Messac are called Messacois in French.

Historical population
Year	Pop.	±% p.a.
1962	2,175	—
1968	2,169	−0.05%
1975	2,212	+0.28%
1982	2,232	+0.13%
1990	2,276	+0.24%
1999	2,243	−0.16%
2006	2,477	+1.43%
2018	3,204	+2.17%
Source: EHESS and INSEE

== See also ==
- Communes of the Ille-et-Vilaine department
