= La Chapelle-de-Brain =

La Chapelle-de-Brain Chapel-Braen (Breton)
- Commune
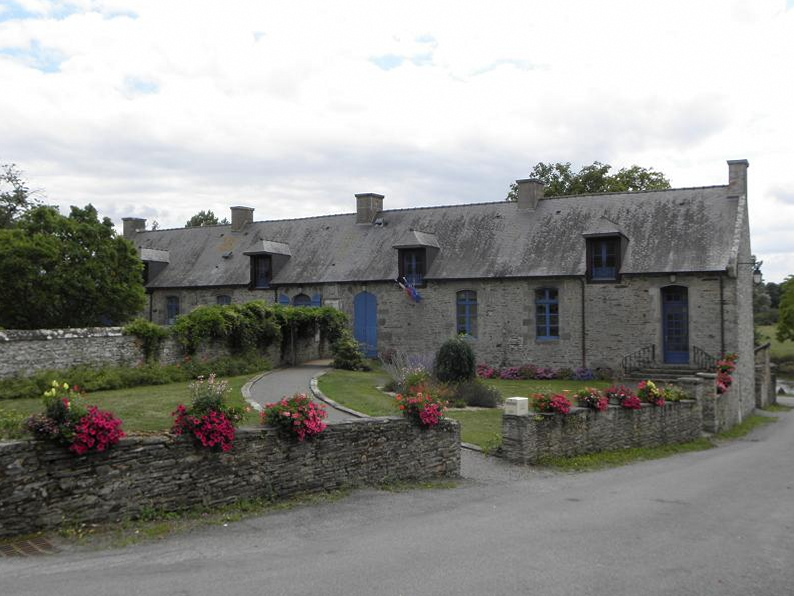
- Town hall
- Location of La Chapelle-de-Brain
- Location within France Location within Brittany
- Coordinates: 47°42′03″N 1°56′00″W
- Country: France
- Region: Brittany
- Department: Ille-et-Vilaine
- Arrondissement: Redon
- Canton: Redon
- Intercommunality: Redon Agglomération

Government
  - Mayor (2020–2026): Yohann Morisot
- Area^{1}: 17.65 km^{2} (6.81 sq mi)
- Highest elevation: 70 m (230 ft)
- Lowest elevation: 1 m (3.3 ft)
- Population (2023): 1,114
  - Density: 63.12/km^{2} (163.5/sq mi)
- Time zone: UTC+01:00 (CET)
  - Summer (DST): UTC+02:00 (CEST)
- INSEE/Postal code: 35064 /35660
- ^{1} French Land Register data, which excludes lakes, ponds, glaciers > 1 km^{2} (0.386 sq mi or 247 acres) and river estuaries.

La Chapelle-de-Brain (French pronunciation: [la ʃapɛl də bʁɛ̃]; Breton: Chapel-Braen) is a commune in the Ille-et-Vilaine department in Brittany in northwestern France.

== Population ==
Inhabitants of La Chapelle-de-Brain are called branichapellois in French.

Historical population
| Year | Pop. | ±% p.a. |
|---|---|---|
| 1968 | 991 | — |
| 1975 | 928 | −0.93% |
| 1982 | 909 | −0.30% |
| 1990 | 887 | −0.31% |
| 1999 | 838 | −0.63% |
| 2007 | 924 | +1.23% |
| 2012 | 970 | +0.98% |
| 2017 | 969 | −0.02% |
| 2023 | 1,114 | +2.35% |
Source: INSEE

== Gallery ==
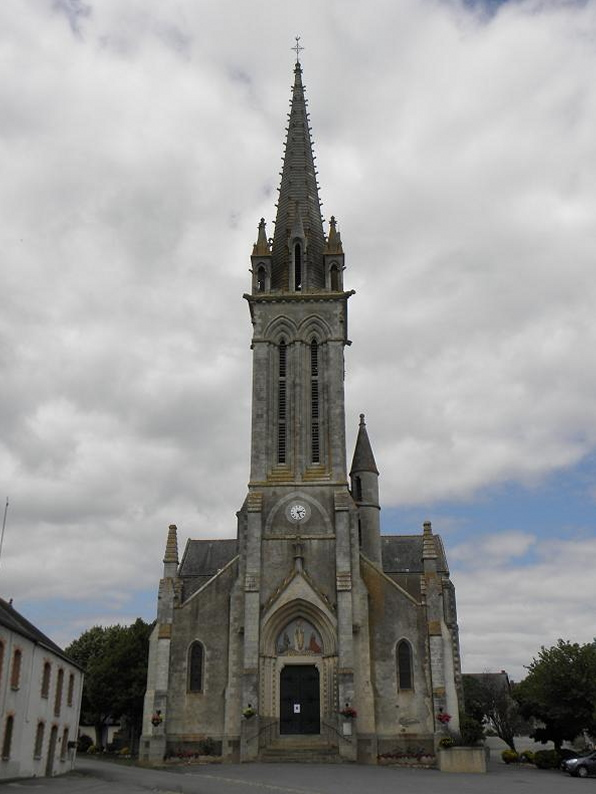
Saint-Melaine church

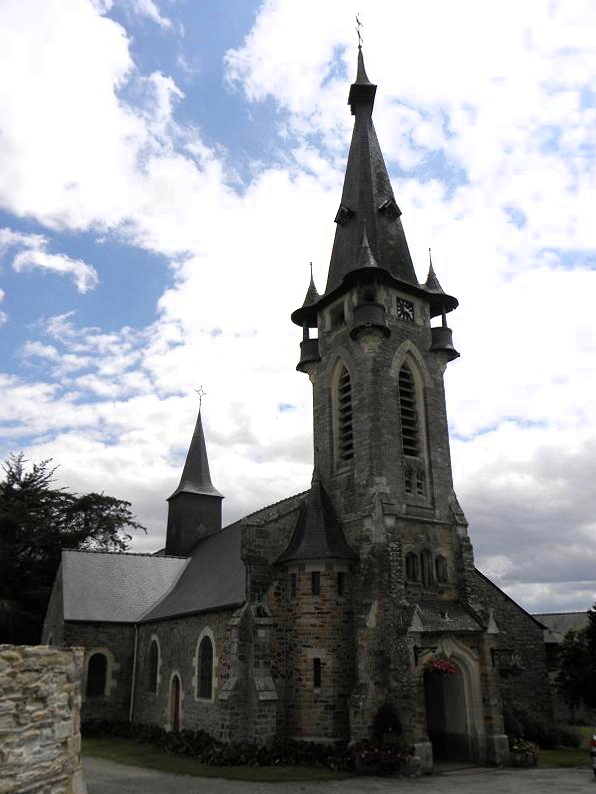
Saint-Melaine Brain-sur-Vilaine church

== See also ==
- Communes of the Ille-et-Vilaine department
