= Bains-sur-Oust =

Bains-sur-Oust Bein (Gallo) Baen-Ballon (Breton)
- Commune
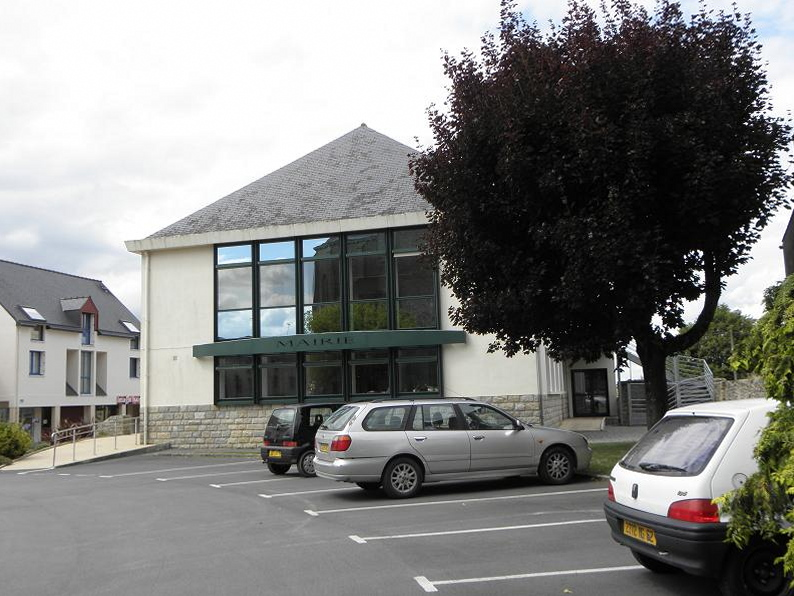
- Town hall

- Coat of arms
- Location of Bains-sur-Oust
- Location within France Location within Brittany
- Coordinates: 47°42′16″N 2°04′13″W
- Country: France
- Region: Brittany
- Department: Ille-et-Vilaine
- Arrondissement: Redon
- Canton: Redon
- Intercommunality: Redon Agglomération

Government
  - Mayor (2020–2026): Daniel Barre
- Area^{1}: 44.63 km^{2} (17.23 sq mi)
- Highest elevation: 89 m (292 ft)
- Lowest elevation: 0 m (0 ft)
- Population (2023): 3,535
  - Density: 79.21/km^{2} (205.1/sq mi)
- Time zone: UTC+01:00 (CET)
  - Summer (DST): UTC+02:00 (CEST)
- INSEE/Postal code: 35013 /35600
- ^{1} French Land Register data, which excludes lakes, ponds, glaciers > 1 km^{2} (0.386 sq mi or 247 acres) and river estuaries.

Bains-sur-Oust (French pronunciation: [bɛ̃ syʁ ust], literally Bains on Oust; Breton: Baen-Ballon, Gallo: Bein) is a commune in the Ille-et-Vilaine departement in Brittany in northwestern France.

== Population ==
Inhabitants of Bains-sur-Oust are called Bainsois in French.

Historical population
Year	Pop.	±% p.a.
1968	2,100	—
1975	2,400	+1.93%
1982	2,610	+1.21%
1990	2,815	+0.95%
1999	3,021	+0.79%
2007	3,343	+1.27%
2012	3,404	+0.36%
2017	3,478	+0.43%
2023	3,535	+0.27%
Source: INSEE

== Personalities ==
- Nominoe, first Duke of Brittany

== See also ==
- Communes of the Ille-et-Vilaine department
