= Renac, Ille-et-Vilaine =

Renac Ranneg (Breton)
- Commune
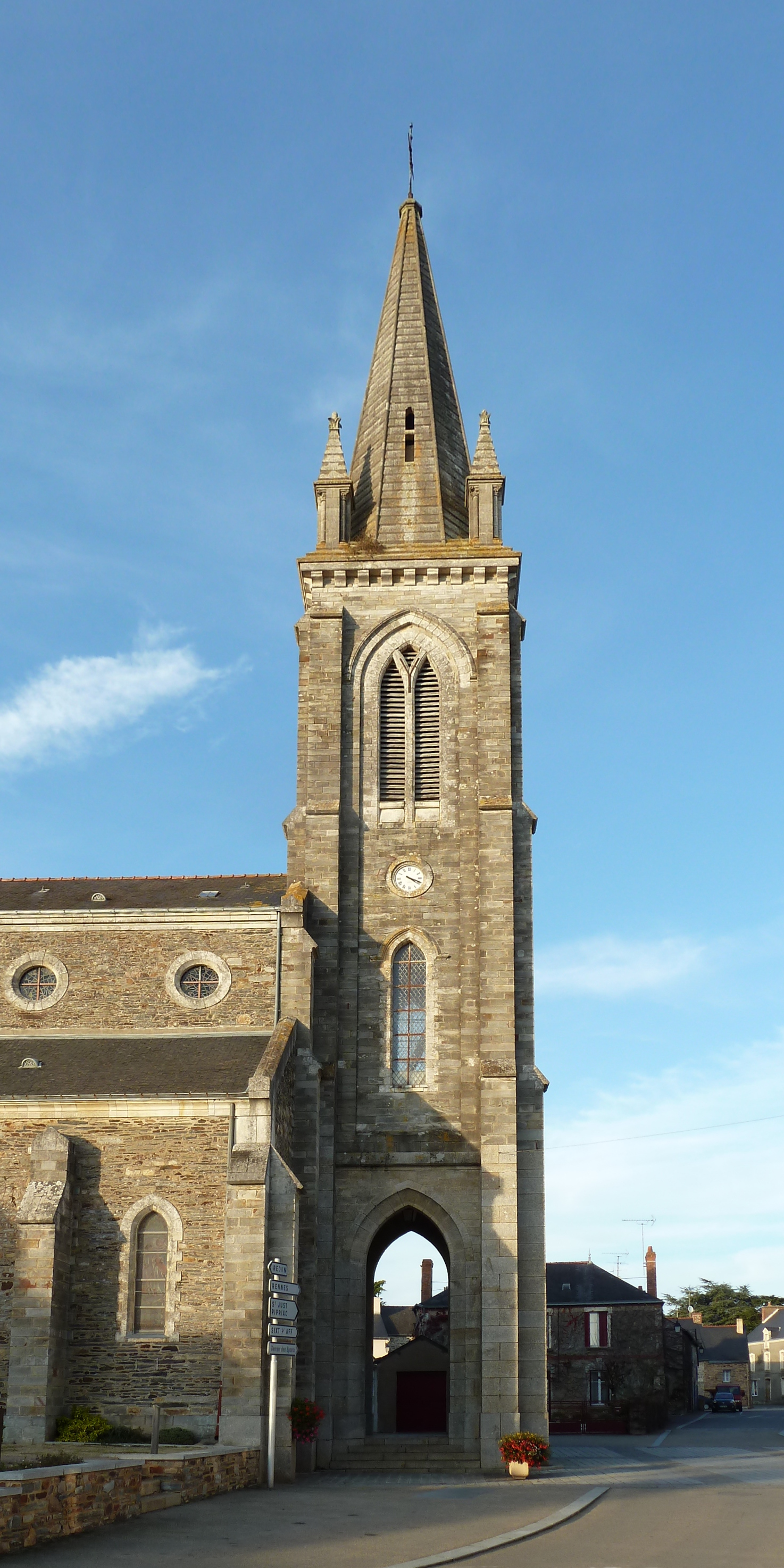
- Location of Renac
- Location within France Location within Brittany
- Coordinates: 47°43′13″N 1°58′30″W
- Country: France
- Region: Brittany
- Department: Ille-et-Vilaine
- Arrondissement: Redon
- Canton: Redon
- Intercommunality: Redon Agglomération

Government
  - Mayor (2020–2026): Patrick Baudy
- Area^{1}: 25.89 km^{2} (10.00 sq mi)
- Highest elevation: 94 m (308 ft)
- Lowest elevation: 2 m (6.6 ft)
- Population (2023): 1,027
  - Density: 39.67/km^{2} (102.7/sq mi)
- Time zone: UTC+01:00 (CET)
  - Summer (DST): UTC+02:00 (CEST)
- INSEE/Postal code: 35237 /35660
- ^{1} French Land Register data, which excludes lakes, ponds, glaciers > 1 km^{2} (0.386 sq mi or 247 acres) and river estuaries.

Renac (French pronunciation: [ʁənak]; Breton: Ranneg; Gallo: Renac) is a commune in the Ille-et-Vilaine department of Brittany in northwestern France.

== Population ==
Inhabitants of Renac are called renacois in French.

Historical population
Year	Pop.	±% p.a.
1968	912	—
1975	768	−2.43%
1982	728	−0.76%
1990	773	+0.75%
1999	859	+1.18%
2007	916	+0.81%
2012	974	+1.24%
2017	1,009	+0.71%
2023	1,027	+0.30%
Source: INSEE

== See also ==
- Communes of the Ille-et-Vilaine department
