= Canton of Redon =

Coordinates: 47.66°N 2.08°W

- Canton
- Country: France
- Region: Brittany
- Department: Ille-et-Vilaine
- No. of communes: {{{nbcomm}}}
- Population (2023): 37,343
- INSEE code: 35 17

The canton of Redon is an administrative division of the Ille-et-Vilaine department, in northwestern France. At the French canton reorganisation which came into effect in March 2015, it was expanded from 6 to 15 communes. Its seat is in Redon.

It consists of the following communes:

1. Bains-sur-Oust
2. Bruc-sur-Aff
3. La Chapelle-de-Brain
4. Guipry-Messac
5. Langon
6. Lieuron
7. Lohéac
8. Pipriac
9. Redon
10. Renac
11. Sainte-Marie
12. Saint-Ganton
13. Saint-Just
14. Saint-Malo-de-Phily
15. Sixt-sur-Aff
