= Redon, Ille-et-Vilaine =

Redon
- Subprefecture and commune
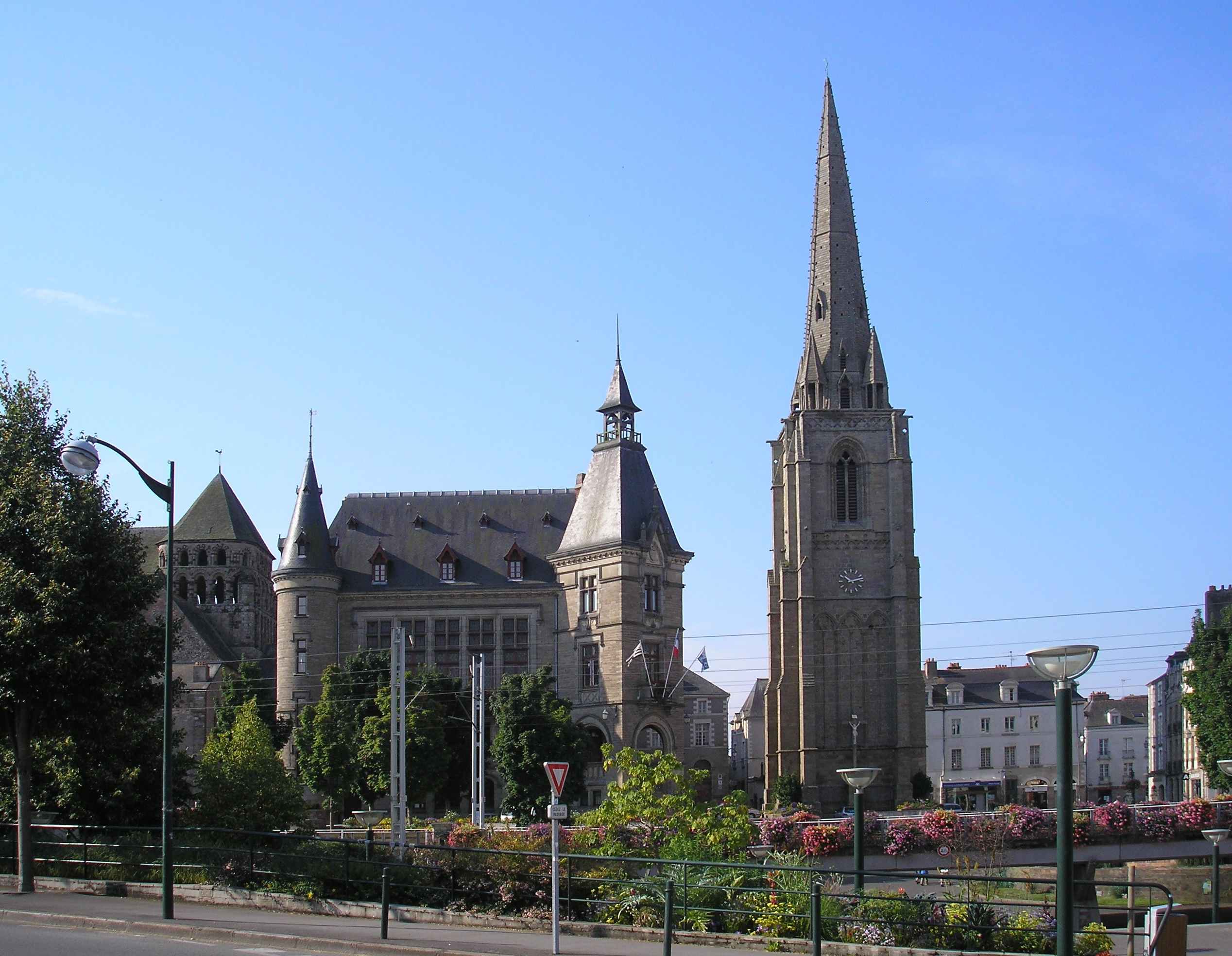
- The town hall and tower of the abbey

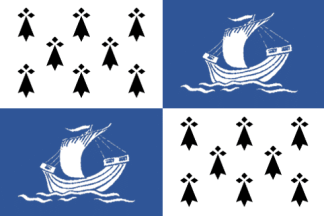
- Flag Coat of arms
- Location of Redon
- Location within France Location within Brittany
- Coordinates: 47°39′08″N 2°05′01″W
- Country: France
- Region: Brittany
- Department: Ille-et-Vilaine
- Arrondissement: Redon
- Canton: Redon
- Intercommunality: Redon Agglomération

Government
  - Mayor (2020–2026): Pascal Duchêne (UDI)
- Area^{1}: 15.09 km^{2} (5.83 sq mi)
- Highest elevation: 73 m (240 ft)
- Lowest elevation: 0 m (0 ft)
- Population (2023): 9,542
  - Density: 632.3/km^{2} (1,638/sq mi)
- Time zone: UTC+01:00 (CET)
  - Summer (DST): UTC+02:00 (CEST)
- INSEE/Postal code: 35236 /35600
- ^{1} French Land Register data, which excludes lakes, ponds, glaciers > 1 km^{2} (0.386 sq mi or 247 acres) and river estuaries.

Redon (French pronunciation: [ʁədɔ̃]; Breton pronunciation: [ˈreːdõn]) is a commune in the Ille-et-Vilaine department in Brittany in northwestern France. It is a sub-prefecture of the department.

== Geography ==
Redon borders the Morbihan and Loire-Atlantique departments.

It is situated at the junction of the Oust and Vilaine rivers and Nantes-Brest canal, which makes it well known for its autumn and winter floods.

It is located at 67 km from Nantes, 70 km from Rennes and 60 km from Vannes.

The town has a station which connects to Quimper and Rennes then Paris in 2:05:00.

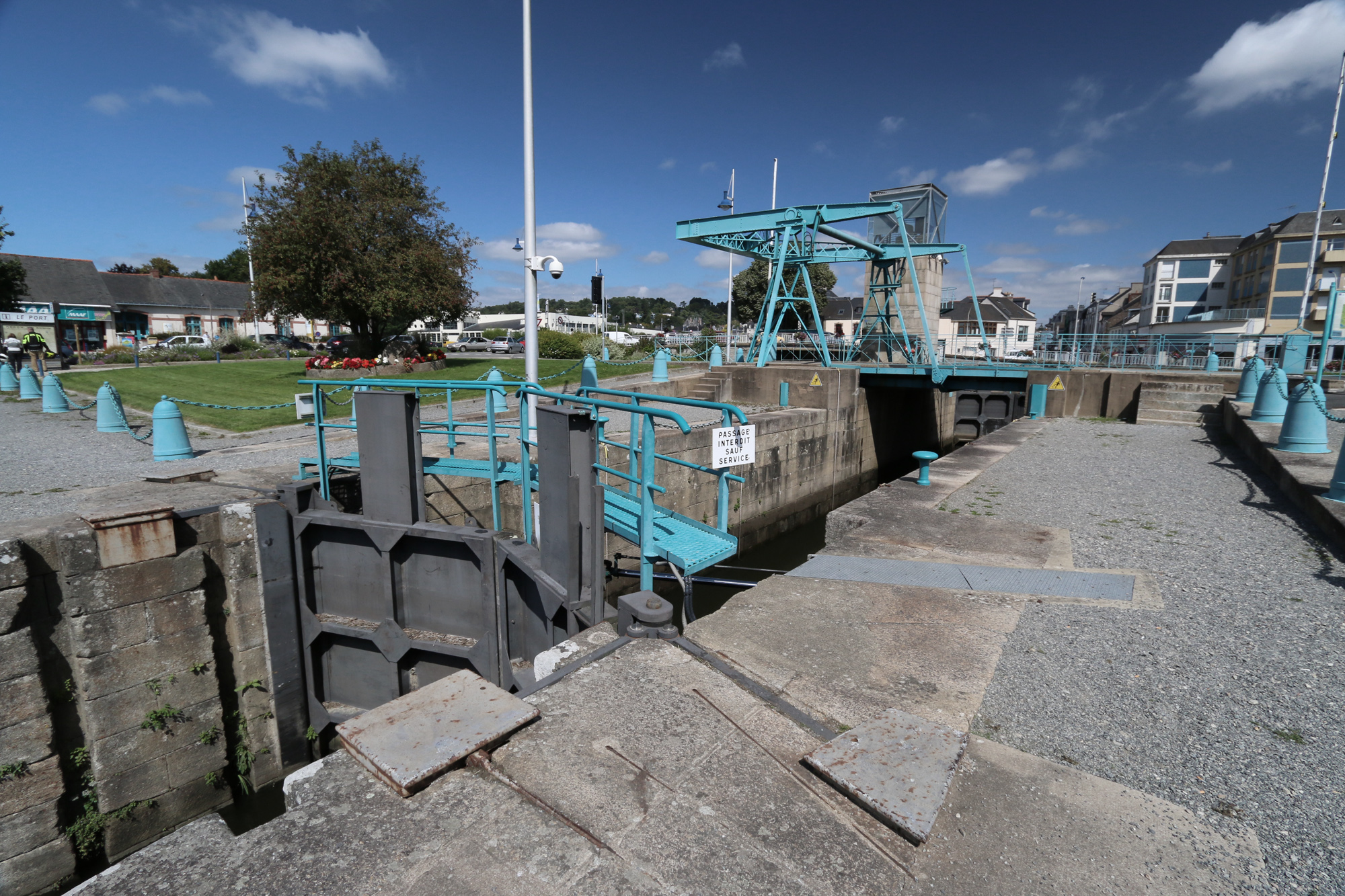
Locks of Port of Redon

== History ==
Very little information exists about this area before 832; however, it would seem that there was a parish by the name of Riedones which gave the town its name. In 832, Conwoïon, a Breton monk with the help of the Carolingian Emperor Louis the Pious founded the abbey of Saint-Sauveur de Redon. Today, documents relating to life within the abbey still exist.

The town developed around the abbey until a small rural community of 6,000 inhabitants was formed in the 1960s.

In the Middle Ages, Redon benefitted from maritime commerce due to its location on the Vilaine.

== Population ==
Inhabitants of Redon are called Redonnais/Redonnaises in French.

Historical population
Year	Pop.	±% p.a.
1968	9,363	—
1975	9,649	+0.43%
1982	9,170	−0.72%
1990	9,260	+0.12%
1999	9,499	+0.28%
2007	9,616	+0.15%
2012	9,306	−0.65%
2017	9,014	−0.64%
2023	9,542	+0.95%
Source: INSEE

== Breton language ==
The municipality launched a linguistic plan through Ya d'ar brezhoneg on 10 October 2008.

In 2008, 14.31% of primary-school children attended bilingual schools.

== Economy ==
- Cargill Texturising Systems - A pectin factory
- Faurecia, subsidiary of Peugeot-Citroën.
- Bic - business making lighters, razors and pens among other things (with only lighters being made in Redon)
- Eis

== Cultural life ==
- Fête de la Chataigne (sweet chestnut festival) in October.
- Festival de la Bogue d'Or (Festival of songs and music from Upper Brittany)
- On Monday 4 July, the third stage of the 2011 Tour de France ended in Redon. The 198 km (123 mi) stage, which was won by Tyler Farrar, was the first time the Tour had passed through Redon.

== International relations ==
Redon is twinned with:

- Andover, United Kingdom.
- Goch, Germany.

== See also ==
- Communes of the Ille-et-Vilaine department
- The works of Jean Fréour Statue of St Conwoïon sculptor
- Saint-Sauveur Abbey Church of Redon
