= Arrondissement of Redon =

Coordinates: 47.65°N 2.08°W

Redon
- Arrondissement
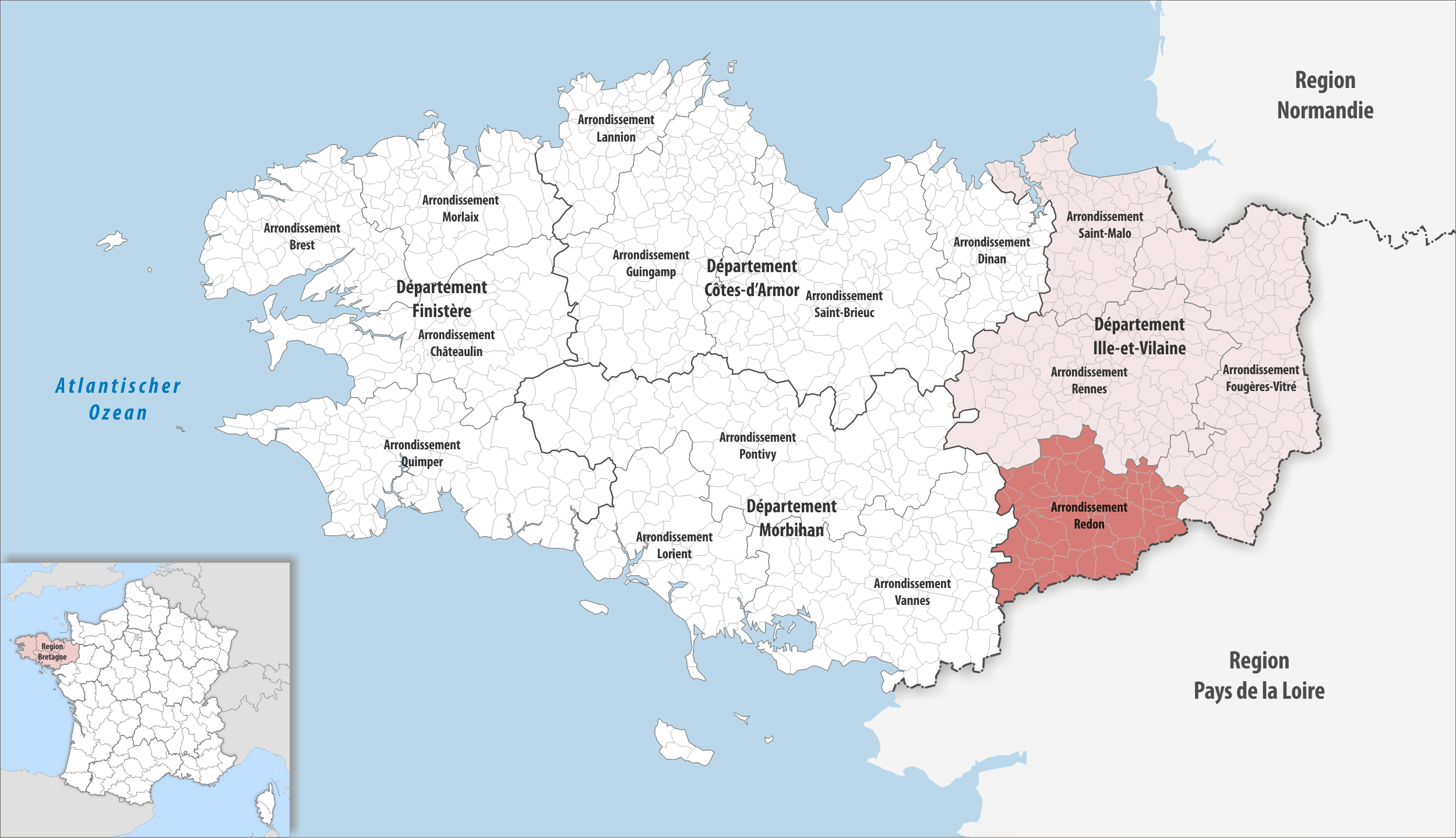
- Location within the region Brittany
- Country: France
- Region: Brittany
- Department: Ille-et-Vilaine
- No. of communes: {{{nbcomm}}}
- Area: 1,302.6 km^{2} (502.9 sq mi)
- Population (2023): 106,782
  - Density: 81.976/km^{2} (212.32/sq mi)
- INSEE code: 352

The arrondissement of Redon is an arrondissement of France in the Ille-et-Vilaine department in the Brittany region. It has 50 communes. Its population is 104,882 (2021), and its area is 1,302.6 km^{2} (502.9 sq mi).

== Composition ==
The communes of the arrondissement of Redon, and their INSEE codes, are:

1. Bain-de-Bretagne (35012)
2. Bains-sur-Oust (35013)
3. Baulon (35016)
4. La Bosse-de-Bretagne (35030)
5. Bourg-des-Comptes (35033)
6. Bovel (35035)
7. Bruc-sur-Aff (35045)
8. Les Brulais (35046)
9. Chanteloup (35054)
10. La Chapelle-Bouëxic (35057)
11. La Chapelle-de-Brain (35064)
12. Comblessac (35084)
13. La Couyère (35089)
14. Crevin (35090)
15. La Dominelais (35098)
16. Ercé-en-Lamée (35106)
17. Goven (35123)
18. Grand-Fougeray (35124)
19. Guichen (35126)
20. Guignen (35127)
21. Guipry-Messac (35176)
22. Lalleu (35140)
23. Langon (35145)
24. Lassy (35149)
25. Lieuron (35151)
26. Lohéac (35155)
27. Loutehel (35160)
28. Mernel (35175)
29. La Noë-Blanche (35202)
30. Pancé (35212)
31. Le Petit-Fougeray (35218)
32. Pipriac (35219)
33. Pléchâtel (35221)
34. Poligné (35231)
35. Redon (35236)
36. Renac (35237)
37. Sainte-Anne-sur-Vilaine (35249)
38. Sainte-Marie (35294)
39. Saint-Ganton (35268)
40. Saint-Just (35285)
41. Saint-Malo-de-Phily (35289)
42. Saint-Senoux (35312)
43. Saint-Sulpice-des-Landes (35316)
44. Saint-Séglin (35311)
45. Saulnières (35321)
46. Le Sel-de-Bretagne (35322)
47. Sixt-sur-Aff (35328)
48. Teillay (35332)
49. Tresbœuf (35343)
50. Val d'Anast (35168)

== History ==
The arrondissement of Redon was created in 1800. At the January 2017 reorganisation of the arrondissements of Ille-et-Vilaine, it lost the commune Laillé to the arrondissement of Rennes.

As a result of the reorganisation of the cantons of France which came into effect in 2015, the borders of the cantons are no longer related to the borders of the arrondissements. The cantons of the arrondissement of Redon were, as of January 2015:

1. Bain-de-Bretagne
2. Grand-Fougeray
3. Guichen
4. Maure-de-Bretagne
5. Pipriac
6. Redon
7. Le Sel-de-Bretagne
