= Tombe à la fille =

Tomb in Teillay Wood, Brittany

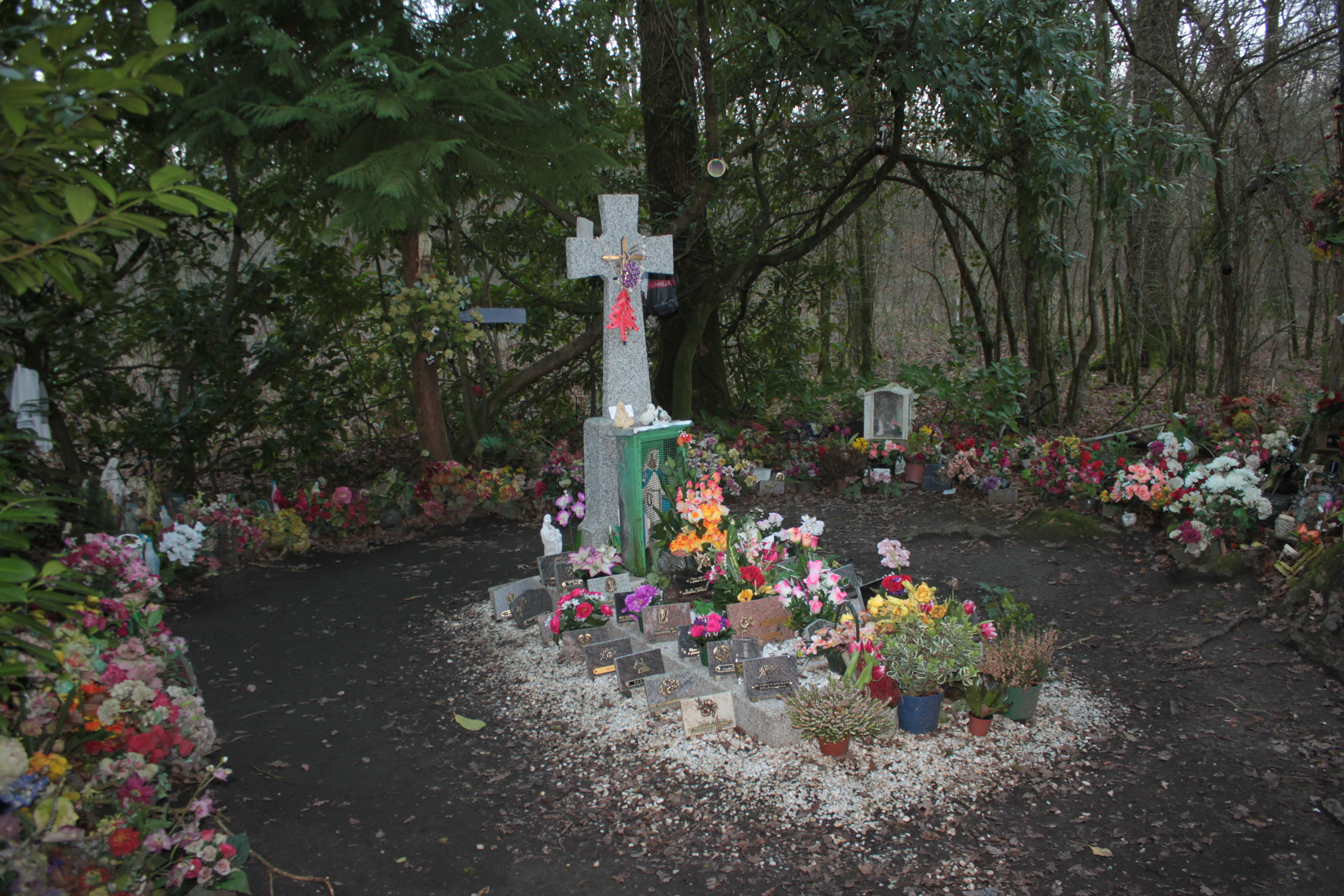
- Completion date: 1795
- Type: Sculpture
- Medium: Granite
- Subject: Cross
- Location: Teillay Brittany; 47°48′29″N 1°32′13″W

The Tombe à la fille (Girl's tomb; Breton: Bez ar plac'h) is a small tomb located in the woods of Teillay, Brittany, France where a girl named Marie Martin is buried. Nicknamed "Sainte Pataude", Marie became a revolutionary saint after she was murdered by Chouans in 1795 during the French Revolution. Her tomb is now a pilgrimage site.

== History ==
Marie Martin was born in Tresboeuf and lived in Teillay. She was supportive of the revolutionary cause and was martyred in 1795 when she was 17 to 19 years old. Her murderers sexually assaulted and brutally tortured her, tied her to an oak tree, and left her to die. She was bound there for three days in agony until a hunter discovered her and ended her suffering. He then buried her by the tree where her tomb stands today.

Historic accounts state that Marie was murdered by Chouans. According to some accounts, Chouans attacked her after she revealed the location of their hideout to Republicans in Bain-de-Bretagne, whereas other versions state that they attacked her after she refused to reveal the location of retreating Republicans or "her masters' hiding place".

Marie became a popular revolutionary saint. She is remembered as Sainte Pataude (transl. clumsy). "Clumsy", or "patao", is the nickname given to the Republicans by the Chouans in Gallo. Her tomb became a popular pilgrimage site where healing miracles were said to occur.

Several oak trees beside her tomb have little niches nailed to them, where visitors once offered coins. People still make pilgrimages to the tomb, especially during the Feast of St. John and Easter. Saint Pataude is traditionally believed to grant favors, including helping young children learn to walk early. Local legend says that no axe can cut the tree where Marie was bound and murdered.

== See also ==
- Perrine Dugué – a teenager who was also murdered by Chouans
- Françoise Gandriau – "Petite-Émigrée", a teenager who was guillotined in 1794

== Bibliography ==
- Ford, Caroline C. (2005). Divided Houses: Religion and Gender in Modern France. London: Cornell University Press. ISBN 0-8014-4367-9.
- Schmitt, Jean-Claude (1983). Les Saints et les stars: le texte hagiographique dans la culture populaire. Paris: Beauchesne. ISBN 978-2-7010-1075-5.
- Soboul, Albert (1985). "Popular Cults during the French Revolution". In Wilson, Stephen (ed.). Saints and their Cults. Cambridge University Press. pp. 220–221.
- Tallet, Frank (1996). Catholicism in Britain & France Since 1789. London: The Hambledon Press. p. 127. ISBN 978-0-8264-4136-2.
