= Saint-Erblon =

Saint-Erblon may refer to:

- Saint-Erblon, Ille-et-Vilaine
- Saint-Erblon, Mayenne
