= Bain-de-Bretagne =

Bain-de-Bretagne Bóen (Gallo) Baen-Veur (Breton)
- Commune
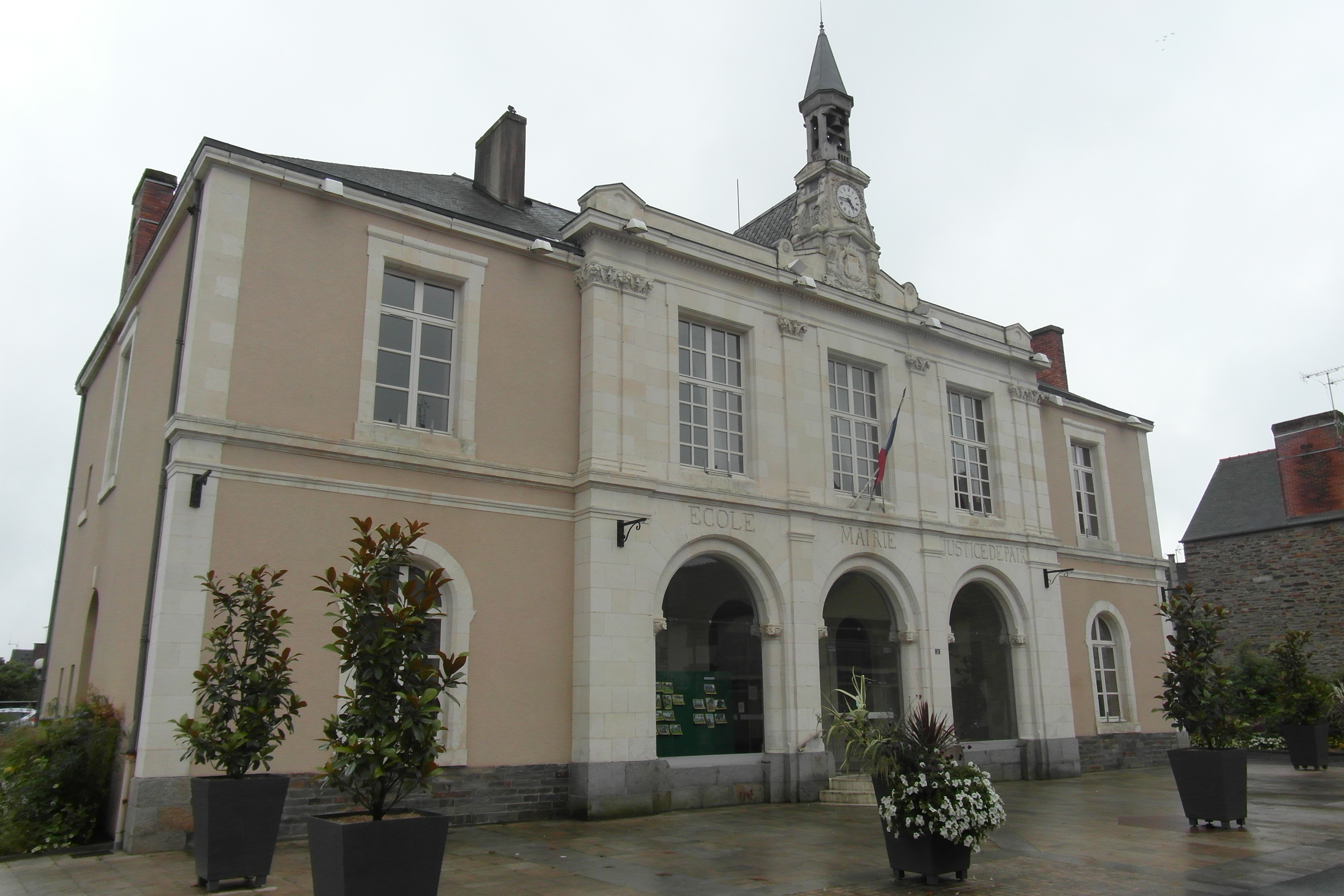
- Town hall

- Coat of arms
- Location of Bain-de-Bretagne
- Location within France Location within Brittany
- Coordinates: 47°50′35″N 1°40′50″W
- Country: France
- Region: Brittany
- Department: Ille-et-Vilaine
- Arrondissement: Redon
- Canton: Bain-de-Bretagne
- Intercommunality: Bretagne Porte de Loire

Government
  - Mayor (2024–2026): Myriam Gohier
- Area^{1}: 64.77 km^{2} (25.01 sq mi)
- Highest elevation: 114 m (374 ft)
- Lowest elevation: 17 m (56 ft)
- Population (2023): 7,674
  - Density: 118.5/km^{2} (306.9/sq mi)
- Time zone: UTC+01:00 (CET)
  - Summer (DST): UTC+02:00 (CEST)
- INSEE/Postal code: 35012 /35470
- ^{1} French Land Register data, which excludes lakes, ponds, glaciers > 1 km^{2} (0.386 sq mi or 247 acres) and river estuaries.

Bain-de-Bretagne (Breton: Baen-Veur, Gallo: Bóen) is a commune in the Ille-et-Vilaine department in Brittany in northwestern France.

== Geography ==
The river Semnon forms part of the commune's northern boundary.

== Population ==
Historical population

Year	Pop.	±% p.a.
1793	3,126	—
1800	3,447	+1.41%
1806	3,062	−1.95%
1821	3,364	+0.63%
1831	3,490	+0.37%
1836	3,585	+0.54%
1841	3,476	−0.62%
1846	3,638	+0.92%
1851	4,159	+2.71%
1856	3,869	−1.44%
1861	4,175	+1.53%
1866	4,353	+0.84%
1872	4,266	−0.34%
1876	4,299	+0.19%
1881	4,932	+2.79%
1886	4,999	+0.27%
1891	4,907	−0.37%
1896	4,920	+0.05%
1901	4,788	−0.54%

Year	Pop.	±% p.a.
1906	4,873	+0.35%
1911	4,786	−0.36%
1921	4,303	−1.06%
1926	4,215	−0.41%
1931	4,044	−0.82%
1936	4,245	+0.97%
1946	4,040	−0.49%
1954	3,901	−0.44%
1962	3,936	+0.11%
1968	4,468	+2.14%
1975	4,970	+1.53%
1982	5,241	+0.76%
1990	5,257	+0.04%
1999	5,516	+0.54%
2007	7,082	+3.17%
2012	7,455	+1.03%
2017	7,331	−0.33%
2023	7,674	+0.77%

Source: EHESS and INSEE

Inhabitants of Bain-de-Bretagne are called Bainais in French.

== Climate ==
Climate data for Bain-de-Bretagne (La Noë-Blanche) (1991–2020 normals, extremes 1988–present)
Month	Jan	Feb	Mar	Apr	May	Jun	Jul	Aug	Sep	Oct	Nov	Dec	Year
Record high °C (°F)	17.4 (63.3)	20.9 (69.6)	23.1 (73.6)	27.6 (81.7)	30.9 (87.6)	40.2 (104.4)	41.2 (106.2)	39.0 (102.2)	35.2 (95.4)	30.2 (86.4)	20.6 (69.1)	17.5 (63.5)	41.2 (106.2)
Mean daily maximum °C (°F)	8.6 (47.5)	9.7 (49.5)	12.7 (54.9)	15.6 (60.1)	19.2 (66.6)	22.7 (72.9)	25.0 (77.0)	25.0 (77.0)	21.8 (71.2)	16.8 (62.2)	12.1 (53.8)	9.1 (48.4)	16.5 (61.7)
Daily mean °C (°F)	5.9 (42.6)	6.3 (43.3)	8.6 (47.5)	10.7 (51.3)	14.1 (57.4)	17.3 (63.1)	19.2 (66.6)	19.2 (66.6)	16.6 (61.9)	13.0 (55.4)	9.0 (48.2)	6.3 (43.3)	12.2 (54.0)
Mean daily minimum °C (°F)	3.2 (37.8)	2.9 (37.2)	4.5 (40.1)	5.9 (42.6)	9.1 (48.4)	11.8 (53.2)	13.4 (56.1)	13.5 (56.3)	11.3 (52.3)	9.3 (48.7)	5.9 (42.6)	3.6 (38.5)	7.9 (46.2)
Record low °C (°F)	−11.6 (11.1)	−10.8 (12.6)	−7.7 (18.1)	−2.2 (28.0)	1.1 (34.0)	3.9 (39.0)	7.3 (45.1)	5.3 (41.5)	2.7 (36.9)	−2.3 (27.9)	−5.9 (21.4)	−8.6 (16.5)	−11.6 (11.1)
Average precipitation mm (inches)	83.9 (3.30)	62.9 (2.48)	56.9 (2.24)	59.9 (2.36)	61.2 (2.41)	50.4 (1.98)	45.1 (1.78)	45.6 (1.80)	57.9 (2.28)	78.1 (3.07)	87.3 (3.44)	91.3 (3.59)	780.5 (30.73)
Average precipitation days (≥ 1.0 mm)	12.2	10.2	9.7	10.2	9.3	8.0	7.4	7.0	8.3	11.8	12.7	13.0	119.7
Source: Meteociel

== See also ==
- Tombe à la fille
- Communes of the Ille-et-Vilaine department
