= La Couyère =

La Couyère La Góyèrr (Gallo) Ar Gouer (Breton)
- Commune
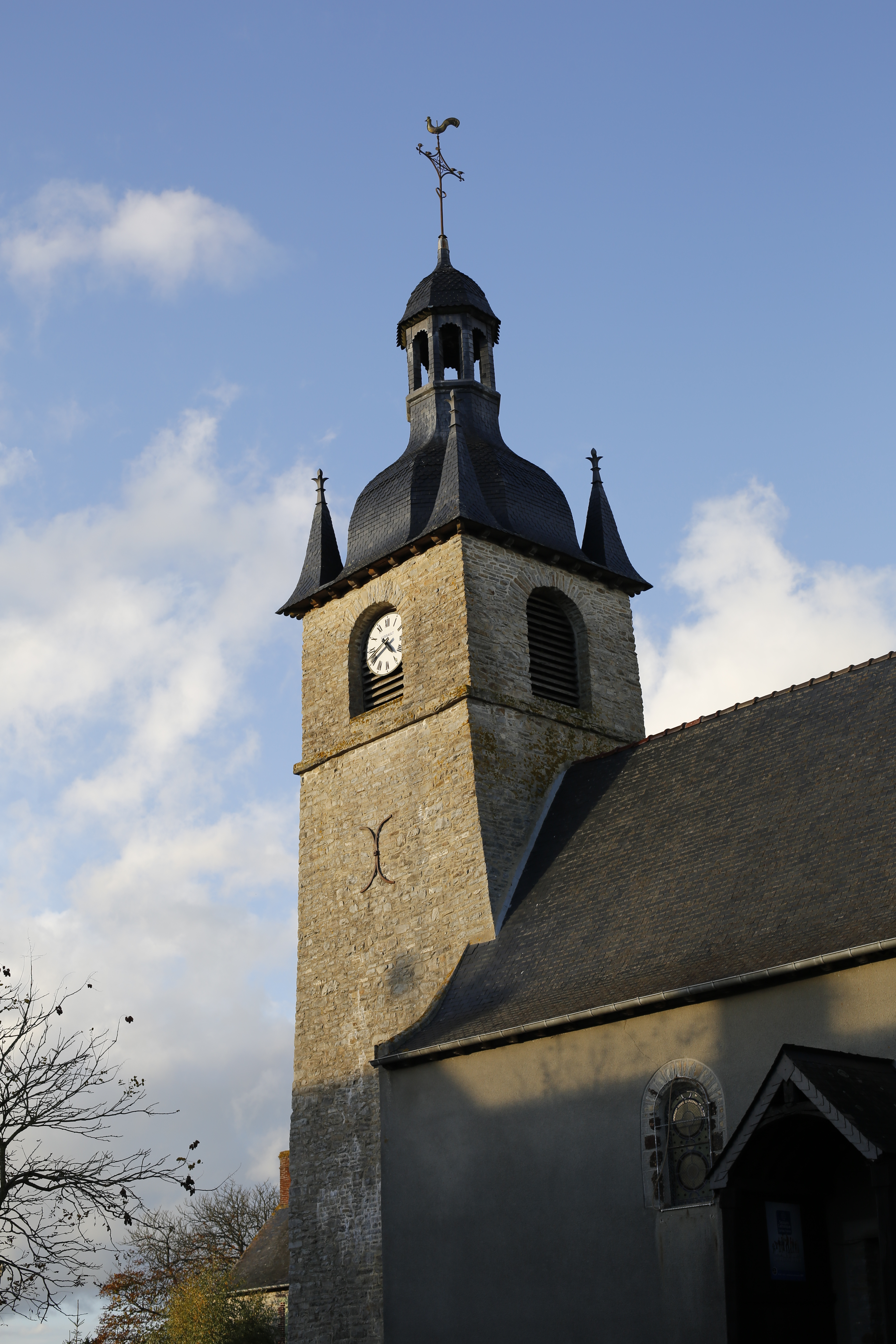
- The bell tower of the church in La Couyère

- Coat of arms
- Location of La Couyère
- Location within France Location within Brittany
- Coordinates: 47°53′17″N 1°30′13″W
- Country: France
- Region: Brittany
- Department: Ille-et-Vilaine
- Arrondissement: Redon
- Canton: Bain-de-Bretagne

Government
  - Mayor (2020–2026): Jacqueline Sollier
- Area^{1}: 11.72 km^{2} (4.53 sq mi)
- Highest elevation: 109 m (358 ft)
- Lowest elevation: 44 m (144 ft)
- Population (2023): 448
  - Density: 38.2/km^{2} (99.0/sq mi)
- Time zone: UTC+01:00 (CET)
  - Summer (DST): UTC+02:00 (CEST)
- INSEE/Postal code: 35089 /35320
- ^{1} French Land Register data, which excludes lakes, ponds, glaciers > 1 km^{2} (0.386 sq mi or 247 acres) and river estuaries.

La Couyère (French pronunciation: [la kujɛʁ]; Gallo: La Góyèrr, Breton: Ar Gouer) is a commune in the Ille-et-Vilaine department of Brittany in northwestern France.

The commune is home to a small Solar System model established in 2011.

== Population ==
Inhabitants of La Couyère are called in French coverois.

Historical population
Year	Pop.	±% p.a.
1968	472	—
1975	437	−1.09%
1982	383	−1.87%
1990	360	−0.77%
1999	350	−0.31%
2007	468	+3.70%
2012	506	+1.57%
2017	479	−1.09%
2023	448	−1.11%
Source: INSEE

== See also ==
- Communes of the Ille-et-Vilaine department
