= Bourg-des-Comptes =

Bourg-des-Comptes Bórg-Cons (Gallo) Gwikomm (Breton)
- Commune
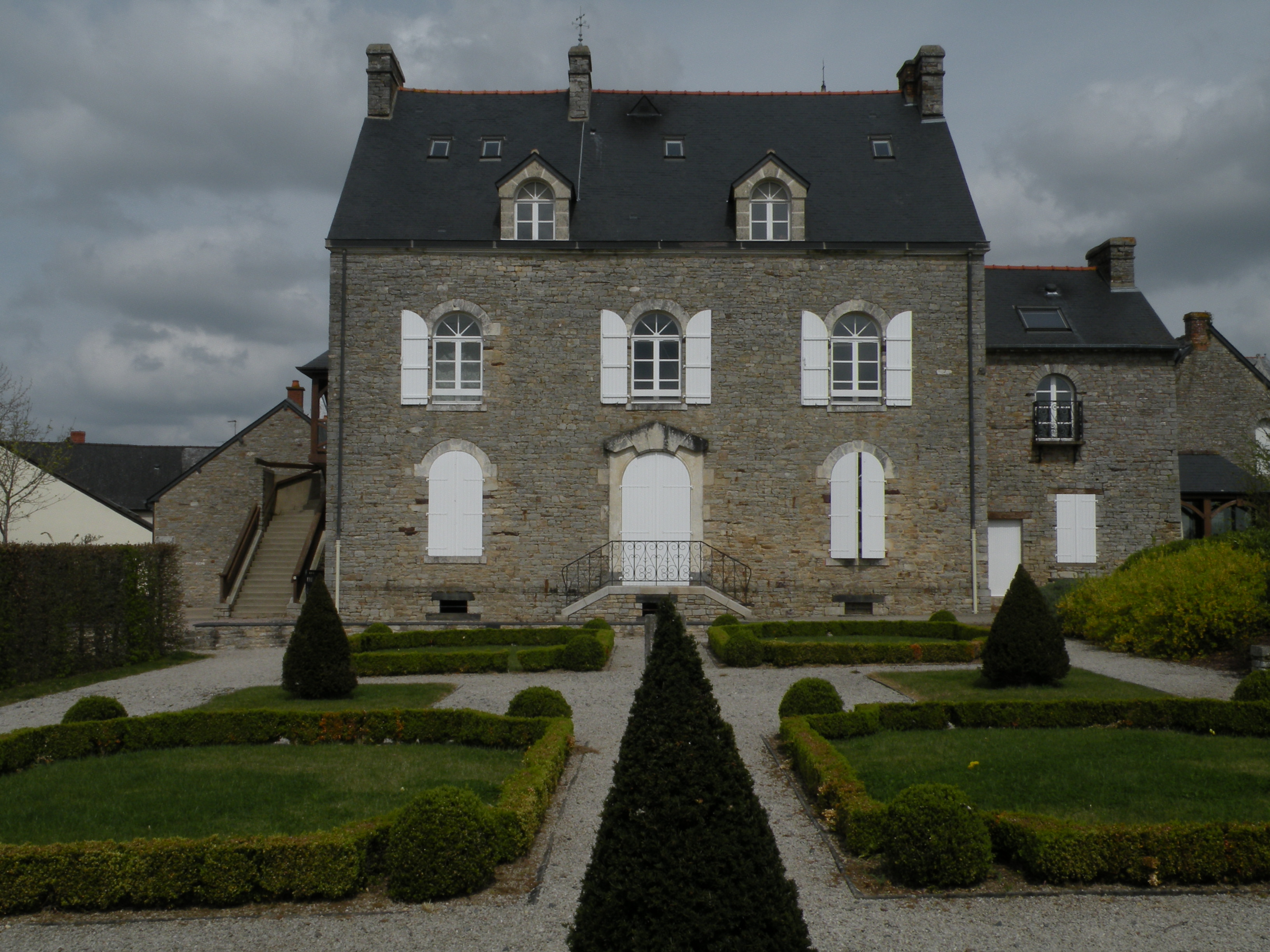
- Town hall

- Coat of arms
- Location of Bourg-des-Comptes
- Location within France Location within Brittany
- Coordinates: 47°55′48″N 1°44′28″W
- Country: France
- Region: Brittany
- Department: Ille-et-Vilaine
- Arrondissement: Redon
- Canton: Guichen
- Intercommunality: Vallons de Haute-Bretagne

Government
  - Mayor (2020–2026): Christian Leprêtre
- Area^{1}: 23.41 km^{2} (9.04 sq mi)
- Highest elevation: 99 m (325 ft)
- Lowest elevation: 7 m (23 ft)
- Population (2023): 3,411
  - Density: 145.7/km^{2} (377.4/sq mi)
- Time zone: UTC+01:00 (CET)
  - Summer (DST): UTC+02:00 (CEST)
- INSEE/Postal code: 35033 /35890
- ^{1} French Land Register data, which excludes lakes, ponds, glaciers > 1 km^{2} (0.386 sq mi or 247 acres) and river estuaries.

Bourg-des-Comptes (French pronunciation: [buʁ de kɔ̃t]; Breton: Gwikomm; Gallo: Bórg-Cons) is a commune in the Ille-et-Vilaine department in Brittany in northwestern France.

== Geography ==
The river Semnon forms all of the commune's southern border, then flows into the Vilaine, which forms all of its western border.

== Population ==
Inhabitants of Bourg-des-Comptes are called Bourgcomptois in French.

Historical population
Year	Pop.	±% p.a.
1968	1,071	—
1975	1,214	+1.81%
1982	1,463	+2.70%
1990	1,727	+2.10%
1999	2,007	+1.68%
2007	2,280	+1.61%
2012	3,122	+6.49%
2017	3,264	+0.89%
2023	3,411	+0.74%
Source: INSEE

== See also ==
- Communes of the Ille-et-Vilaine department
- Jean-Marie Valentin
