= Lalleu =

Lalleu Laloe (Gallo) An Alloz (Breton)
- Commune
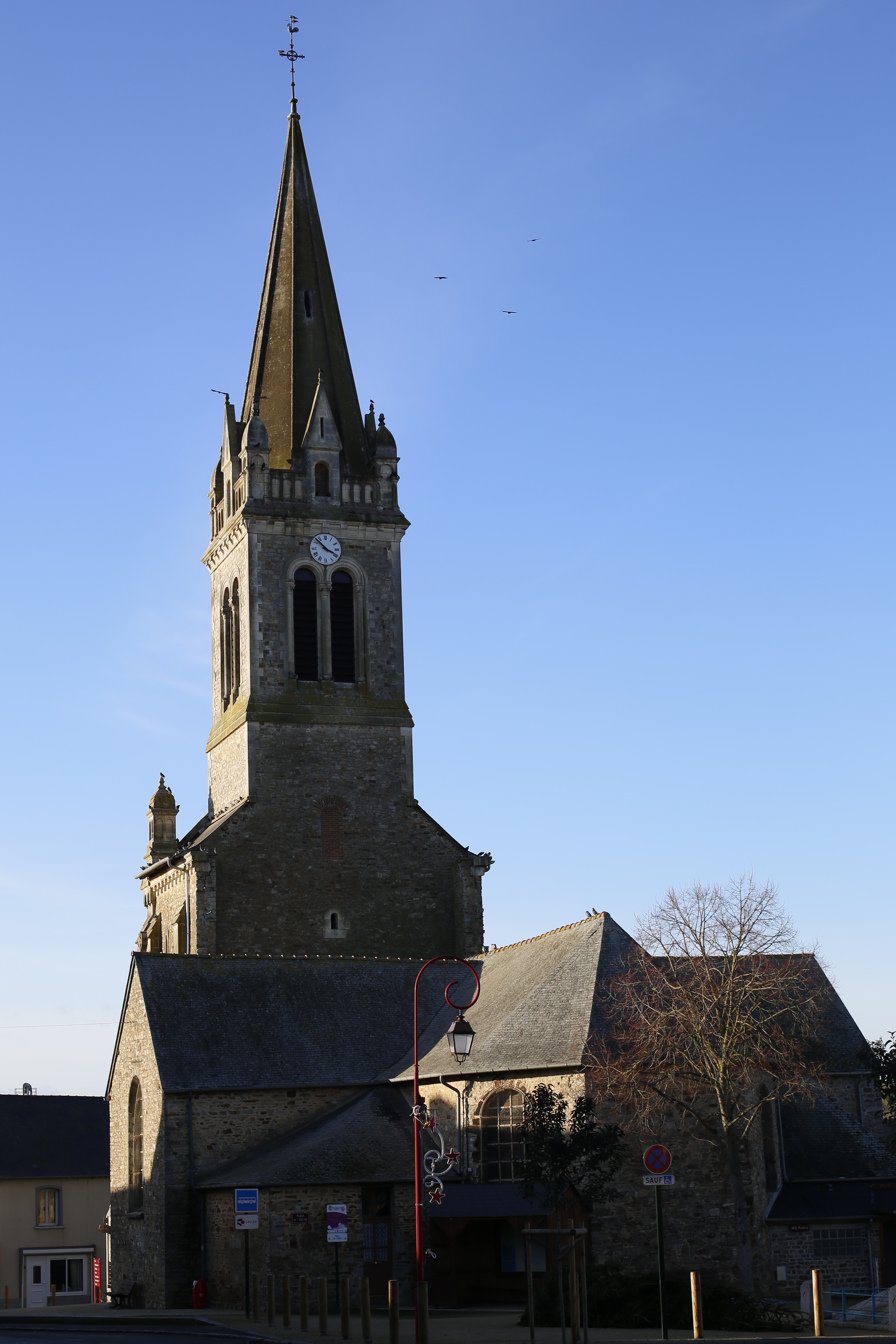
- The church of Saint-Jean-Baptiste
- Location of Lalleu
- Location within France Location within Brittany
- Coordinates: 47°51′22″N 1°30′32″W
- Country: France
- Region: Brittany
- Department: Ille-et-Vilaine
- Arrondissement: Redon
- Canton: Bain-de-Bretagne
- Intercommunality: Bretagne Porte de Loire

Government
  - Mayor (2020–2026): Thierry Lassalle
- Area^{1}: 15.47 km^{2} (5.97 sq mi)
- Highest elevation: 104 m (341 ft)
- Lowest elevation: 31 m (102 ft)
- Population (2023): 593
  - Density: 38.3/km^{2} (99.3/sq mi)
- Time zone: UTC+01:00 (CET)
  - Summer (DST): UTC+02:00 (CEST)
- INSEE/Postal code: 35140 /35320
- ^{1} French Land Register data, which excludes lakes, ponds, glaciers > 1 km^{2} (0.386 sq mi or 247 acres) and river estuaries.

Lalleu (French pronunciation: [lalø]; Gallo: Laloe, Breton: An Alloz) is a commune in the Ille-et-Vilaine department in Brittany in northwestern France.

== Geography ==
The stream de la Couyère forms all of the commune's eastern border, then flows into the Semnon, which forms all of its southern border.

== Population ==
Inhabitants of Lalleu are called Allodiens in French.

Historical population
Year	Pop.	±% p.a.
1968	588	—
1975	506	−2.12%
1982	460	−1.35%
1990	445	−0.41%
1999	469	+0.59%
2007	555	+2.13%
2012	598	+1.50%
2017	567	−1.06%
2023	593	+0.75%
Source: INSEE

== See also ==
- Communes of the Ille-et-Vilaine department
