= Poligné =

Poligné Polinyae (Gallo) Polinieg (Breton)
- Commune
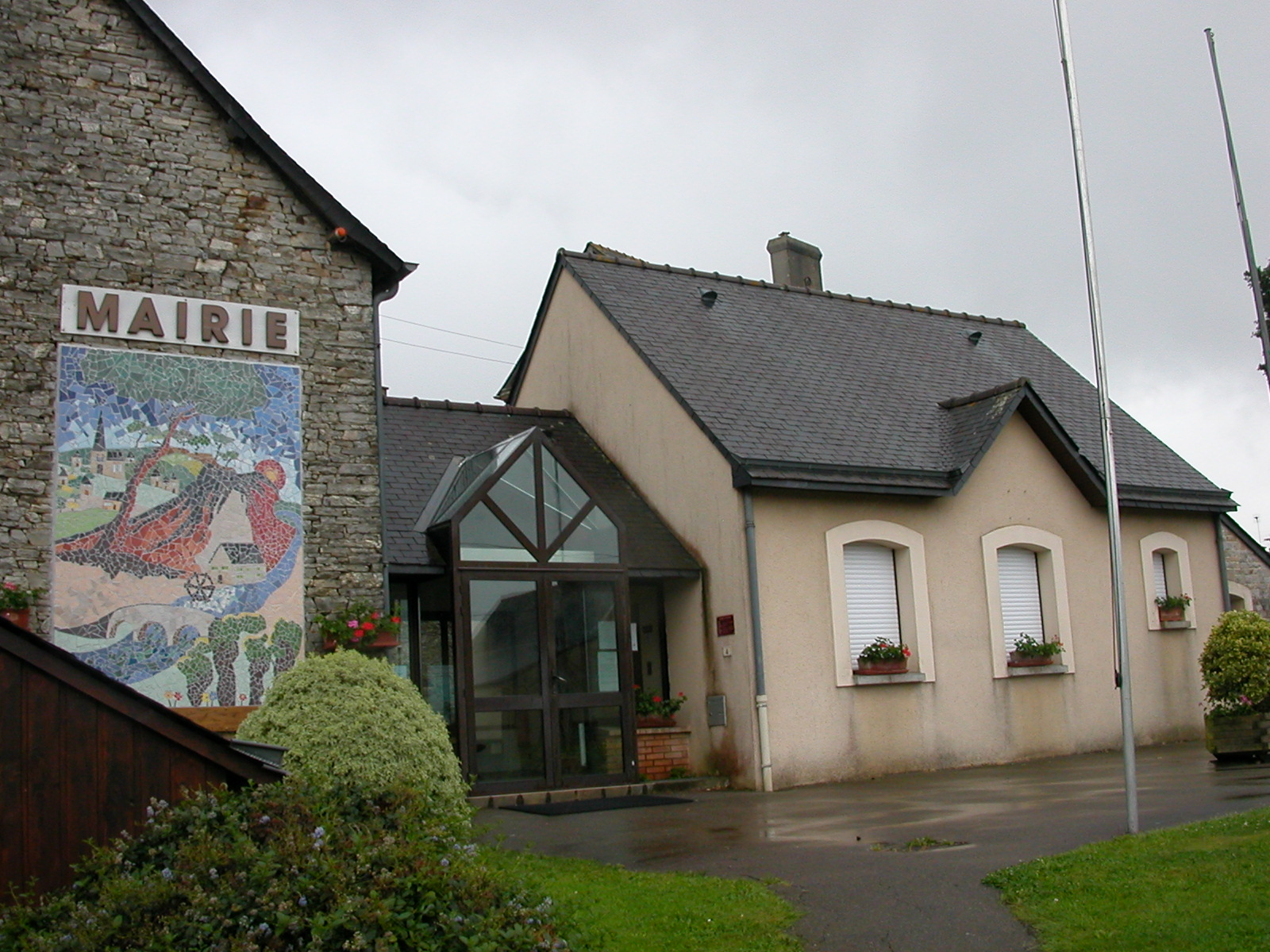
- The town hall in Poligné
- Location of Poligné
- Location within France Location within Brittany
- Coordinates: 47°53′17″N 1°41′06″W
- Country: France
- Region: Brittany
- Department: Ille-et-Vilaine
- Arrondissement: Redon
- Canton: Bain-de-Bretagne

Government
  - Mayor (2020–2026): Guy Rinfray
- Area^{1}: 9.24 km^{2} (3.57 sq mi)
- Highest elevation: 93 m (305 ft)
- Lowest elevation: 12 m (39 ft)
- Population (2023): 1,261
  - Density: 136/km^{2} (353/sq mi)
- Time zone: UTC+01:00 (CET)
  - Summer (DST): UTC+02:00 (CEST)
- INSEE/Postal code: 35231 /35320
- ^{1} French Land Register data, which excludes lakes, ponds, glaciers > 1 km^{2} (0.386 sq mi or 247 acres) and river estuaries.

Poligné (French pronunciation: [pɔliɲe]; Gallo: Polinyae, Breton: Polinieg) is a commune in the Ille-et-Vilaine department of Brittany in northwestern France.

== Geography ==
The river Semnon forms all of the commune's southwestern border.

== Population ==
Inhabitants of Poligné are called polinéens in French.

Historical population
Year	Pop.	±% p.a.
1968	456	—
1975	447	−0.28%
1982	492	+1.38%
1990	618	+2.89%
1999	760	+2.32%
2007	1,047	+4.09%
2012	1,144	+1.79%
2017	1,201	+0.98%
2023	1,261	+0.82%
Source: INSEE

== See also ==
- Communes of the Ille-et-Vilaine department
