= Chanteloup, Ille-et-Vilaine =

Chanteloup Chaunteló (Gallo) Kantlou (Breton)
- Commune
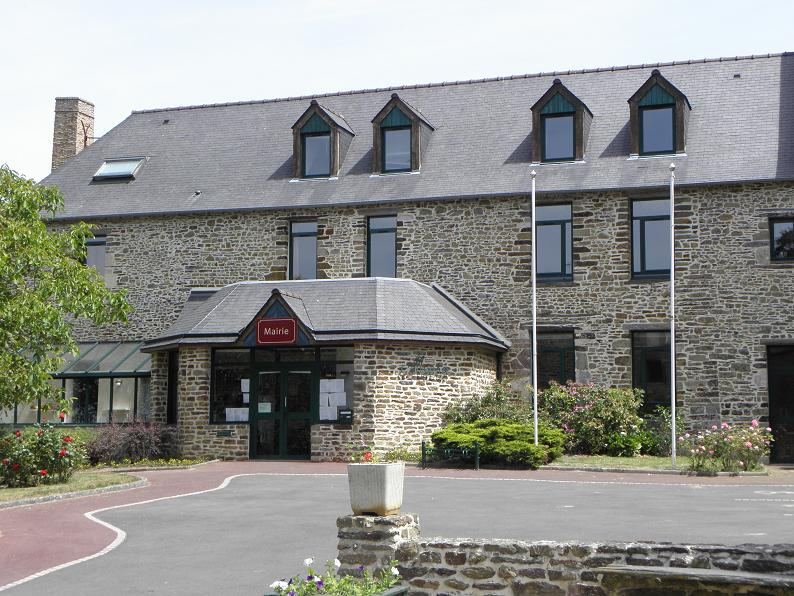
- Town hall
- Location of Chanteloup
- Location within France Location within Brittany
- Coordinates: 47°58′00″N 1°36′51″W
- Country: France
- Region: Brittany
- Department: Ille-et-Vilaine
- Arrondissement: Redon
- Canton: Bain-de-Bretagne

Government
  - Mayor (2020–2026): Vincent Minier
- Area^{1}: 17.53 km^{2} (6.77 sq mi)
- Highest elevation: 109 m (358 ft)
- Lowest elevation: 38 m (125 ft)
- Population (2023): 1,912
  - Density: 109.1/km^{2} (282.5/sq mi)
- Time zone: UTC+01:00 (CET)
  - Summer (DST): UTC+02:00 (CEST)
- INSEE/Postal code: 35054 /35150
- ^{1} French Land Register data, which excludes lakes, ponds, glaciers > 1 km^{2} (0.386 sq mi or 247 acres) and river estuaries.

Chanteloup (French pronunciation: [ʃɑ̃tlu]; Gallo: Chaunteló, Breton: Kantlou) is a commune in the Ille-et-Vilaine department in Brittany in northwestern France.

== Population ==
Inhabitants of Chanteloup are called Canteloupiens in French.

Historical population
Year	Pop.	±% p.a.
1968	772	—
1975	823	+0.92%
1982	939	+1.90%
1990	943	+0.05%
1999	1,109	+1.82%
2007	1,477	+3.65%
2012	1,733	+3.25%
2017	1,815	+0.93%
2023	1,912	+0.87%
Source: INSEE

== See also ==
- Communes of the Ille-et-Vilaine department
