= Sainte-Anne-sur-Vilaine =

Sainte-Anne-sur-Vilaine Saentt-Ann-sur-Vilaèyn (Gallo) Santez-Anna-ar-Gwilen (Breton)
- Commune
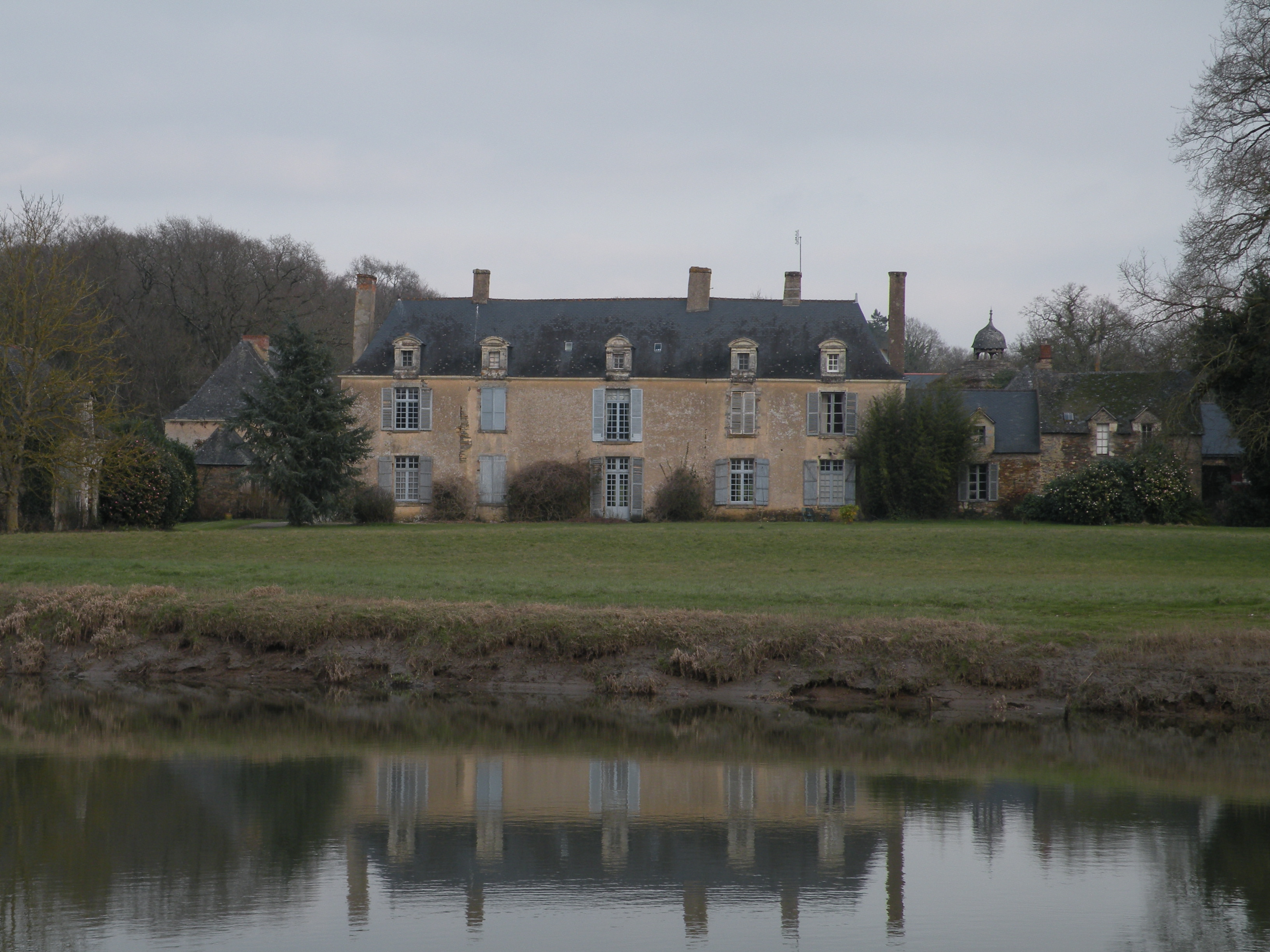
- The château of Port de Roche, in Sainte-Anne-sur-Vilaine
- Location of Sainte-Anne-sur-Vilaine
- Location within France Location within Brittany
- Coordinates: 47°43′53″N 1°49′27″W
- Country: France
- Region: Brittany
- Department: Ille-et-Vilaine
- Arrondissement: Redon
- Canton: Bain-de-Bretagne
- Intercommunality: Bretagne Porte de Loire

Government
  - Mayor (2020–2026): Jean-Michel Gaudichon
- Area^{1}: 28.57 km^{2} (11.03 sq mi)
- Highest elevation: 85 m (279 ft)
- Lowest elevation: 2 m (6.6 ft)
- Population (2023): 1,035
  - Density: 36.23/km^{2} (93.83/sq mi)
- Time zone: UTC+01:00 (CET)
  - Summer (DST): UTC+02:00 (CEST)
- INSEE/Postal code: 35249 /35390
- ^{1} French Land Register data, which excludes lakes, ponds, glaciers > 1 km^{2} (0.386 sq mi or 247 acres) and river estuaries.

Sainte-Anne-sur-Vilaine (French pronunciation: [sɛ̃t an syʁ vilɛn], literally Sainte-Anne on Vilaine; Gallo: Saentt-Ann-sur-Vilaèyn, Breton: Santez-Anna-ar-Gwilen) is a commune in the Ille-et-Vilaine department in Brittany in northwestern France.

== Geography ==
The river Chère forms all of the commune's southern border, then flows into the Vilaine, which forms all of its western border.

== Population ==
Inhabitants of Sainte-Anne-sur-Vilaine are called saintanais in French.

Historical population
Year	Pop.	±% p.a.
1968	880	—
1975	846	−0.56%
1982	797	−0.85%
1990	737	−0.97%
1999	779	+0.62%
2007	959	+2.63%
2012	999	+0.82%
2017	1,018	+0.38%
2023	1,035	+0.28%
Source: INSEE

== See also ==
- Communes of the Ille-et-Vilaine department
