= Pancé =

Pancé Panczaé (Gallo) Pantieg (Breton)
- Commune
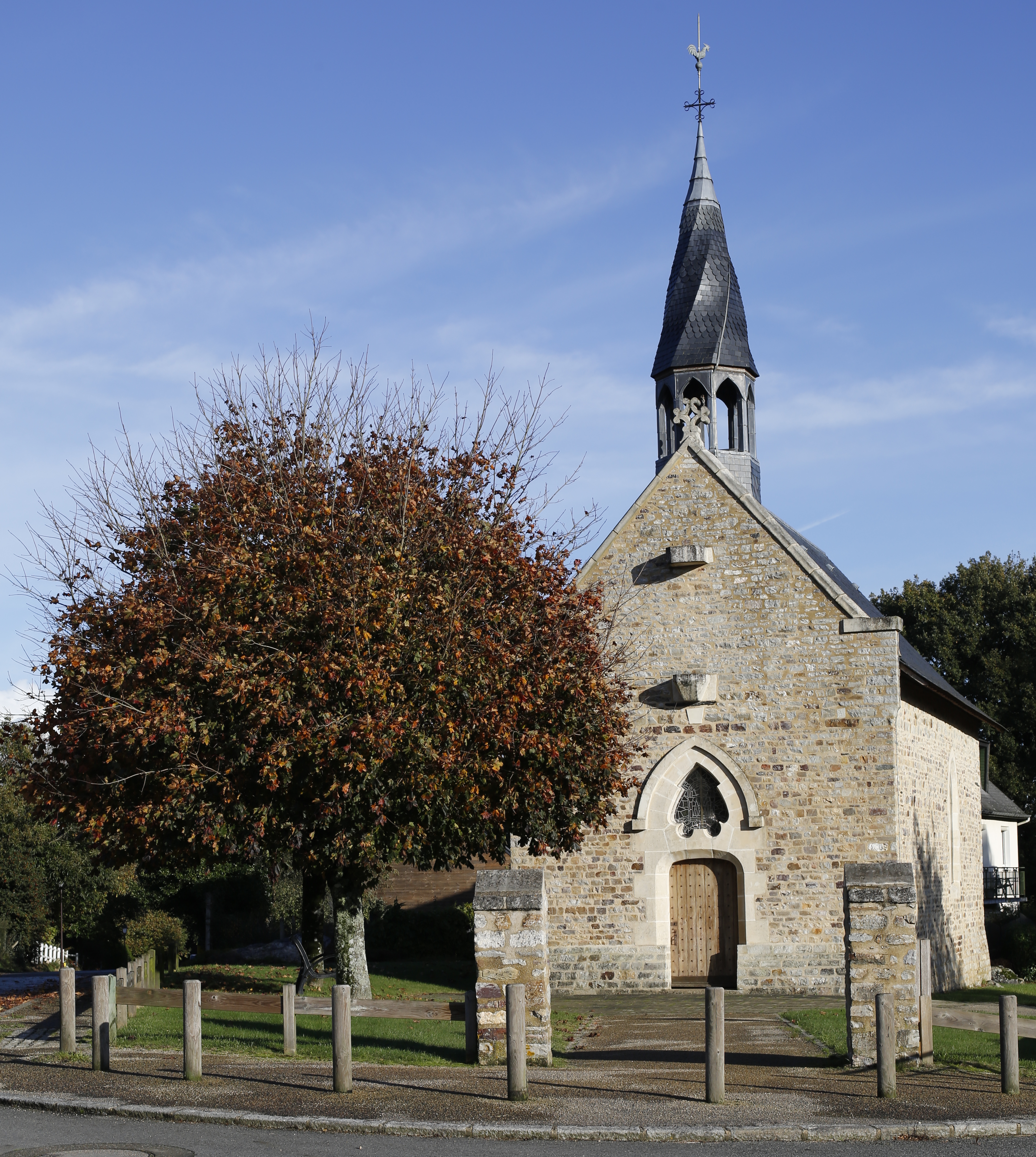
- The chapel of Saint-Melaine
- Location of Pancé
- Location within France Location within Brittany
- Coordinates: 47°52′56″N 1°39′25″W
- Country: France
- Region: Brittany
- Department: Ille-et-Vilaine
- Arrondissement: Redon
- Canton: Bain-de-Bretagne
- Intercommunality: Bretagne Porte de Loire

Government
  - Mayor (2020–2026): Jean-François Pilard
- Area^{1}: 19.33 km^{2} (7.46 sq mi)
- Highest elevation: 105 m (344 ft)
- Lowest elevation: 17 m (56 ft)
- Population (2023): 1,159
  - Density: 59.96/km^{2} (155.3/sq mi)
- Time zone: UTC+01:00 (CET)
  - Summer (DST): UTC+02:00 (CEST)
- INSEE/Postal code: 35212 /35320
- ^{1} French Land Register data, which excludes lakes, ponds, glaciers > 1 km^{2} (0.386 sq mi or 247 acres) and river estuaries.

Pancé (French pronunciation: [pɑ̃se]; Breton: Pantieg; Gallo: Panczaé) is a commune in the Ille-et-Vilaine department of Brittany in northwestern France.

== Geography ==
The river Semnon forms all of the commune's southern border.

== Population ==
Inhabitants of Pancé are called Pancéens in French.

Historical population
Year	Pop.	±% p.a.
1968	725	—
1975	689	−0.72%
1982	763	+1.47%
1990	794	+0.50%
1999	964	+2.18%
2007	1,118	+1.87%
2012	1,149	+0.55%
2017	1,171	+0.38%
2023	1,159	−0.17%
Source: INSEE

== See also ==
- Communes of the Ille-et-Vilaine department
