= Mont-Dol =

Mont-Dol Mont-Dou (Gallo) Menez-Dol (Breton)
- Commune
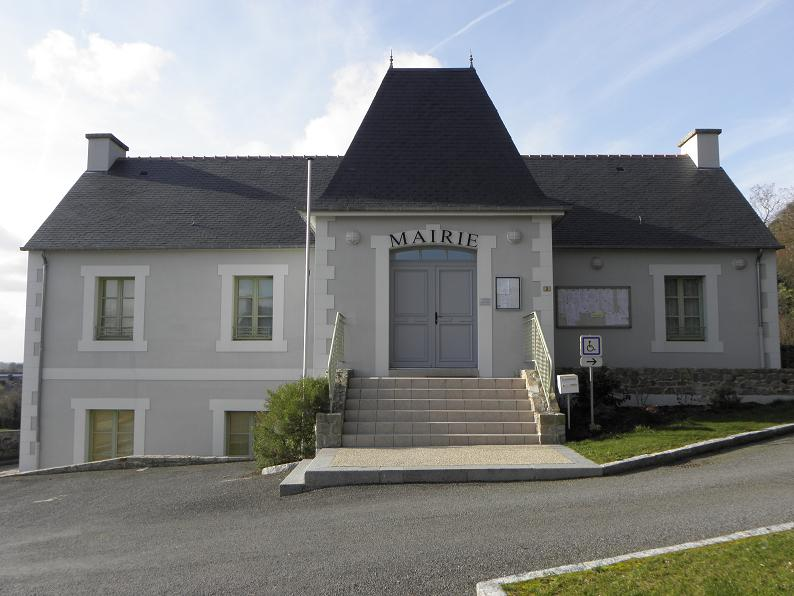
- The town hall of Mont-Dol

- Coat of arms
- Location of Mont-Dol
- Location within France Location within Brittany
- Coordinates: 48°34′14″N 1°45′53″W
- Country: France
- Region: Brittany
- Department: Ille-et-Vilaine
- Arrondissement: Saint-Malo
- Canton: Dol-de-Bretagne
- Intercommunality: Pays de Dol et Baie du Mont Saint-Michel

Government
  - Mayor (2020–2026): Marie-Élisabeth Solier
- Area^{1}: 26.44 km^{2} (10.21 sq mi)
- Highest elevation: 62 m (203 ft)
- Lowest elevation: 1 m (3.3 ft)
- Population (2023): 1,101
  - Density: 41.64/km^{2} (107.9/sq mi)
- Time zone: UTC+01:00 (CET)
  - Summer (DST): UTC+02:00 (CEST)
- INSEE/Postal code: 35186 /35120
- ^{1} French Land Register data, which excludes lakes, ponds, glaciers > 1 km^{2} (0.386 sq mi or 247 acres) and river estuaries.

Mont-Dol (French pronunciation: [mɔ̃ dɔl]; Breton: Menez-Dol; Gallo: Mont-Dou) is a commune in the Ille-et-Vilaine department in Brittany in northwestern France.

== Population ==
Inhabitants of Mont-Dol are called Mont-Dolois in French.

Historical population
Year	Pop.	±% p.a.
1968	1,105	—
1975	1,060	−0.59%
1982	1,046	−0.19%
1990	1,111	+0.76%
1999	1,095	−0.16%
2007	1,205	+1.20%
2012	1,173	−0.54%
2017	1,093	−1.40%
2023	1,101	+0.12%
Source: INSEE

== See also ==
- Communes of the Ille-et-Vilaine department
