= Saulnières, Ille-et-Vilaine =

Saulnières Saunierr (Gallo) Saoner (Breton)
- Commune
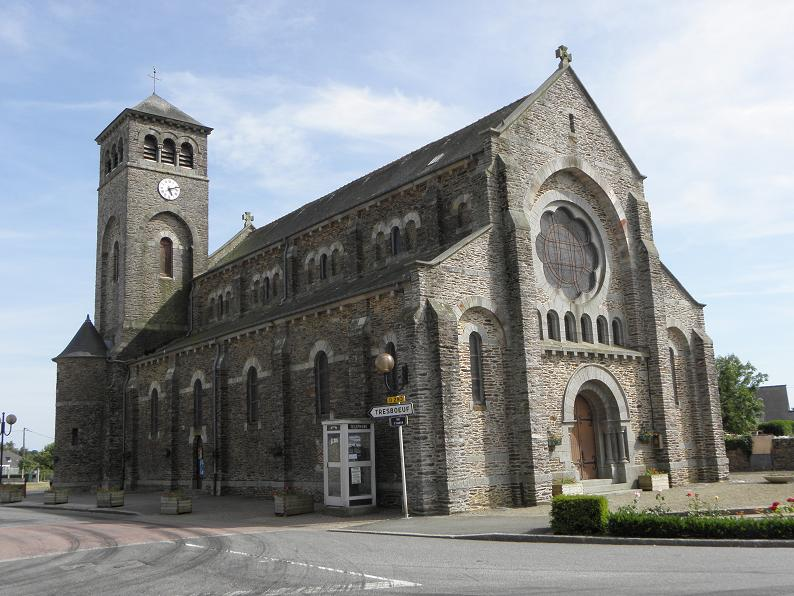
- The church of Saint-Martin, in Saulnières

- Coat of arms
- Location of Saulnières
- Location within France Location within Brittany
- Coordinates: 47°55′00″N 1°35′11″W
- Country: France
- Region: Brittany
- Department: Ille-et-Vilaine
- Arrondissement: Redon
- Canton: Bain-de-Bretagne

Government
  - Mayor (2020–2026): Laurent Le Guéhennec
- Area^{1}: 10.34 km^{2} (3.99 sq mi)
- Highest elevation: 117 m (384 ft)
- Lowest elevation: 56 m (184 ft)
- Population (2023): 801
  - Density: 77.5/km^{2} (201/sq mi)
- Time zone: UTC+01:00 (CET)
  - Summer (DST): UTC+02:00 (CEST)
- INSEE/Postal code: 35321 /35320
- ^{1} French Land Register data, which excludes lakes, ponds, glaciers > 1 km^{2} (0.386 sq mi or 247 acres) and river estuaries.

Saulnières (French pronunciation: [so(l)njɛʁ]; Gallo: Saunierr, Breton: Saoner) is a commune in the Ille-et-Vilaine department in Brittany in northwestern France.

== Population ==
Inhabitants of Saulnières are called Saulniérois in French.

Historical population
Year	Pop.	±% p.a.
1968	503	—
1975	466	−1.09%
1982	531	+1.88%
1990	558	+0.62%
1999	581	+0.45%
2007	673	+1.85%
2012	715	+1.22%
2017	773	+1.57%
2023	801	+0.59%
Source: INSEE

== See also ==
- Communes of the Ille-et-Vilaine department
