= Crevin =

Crevin Créven (Gallo) Kreven (Breton)
- Commune
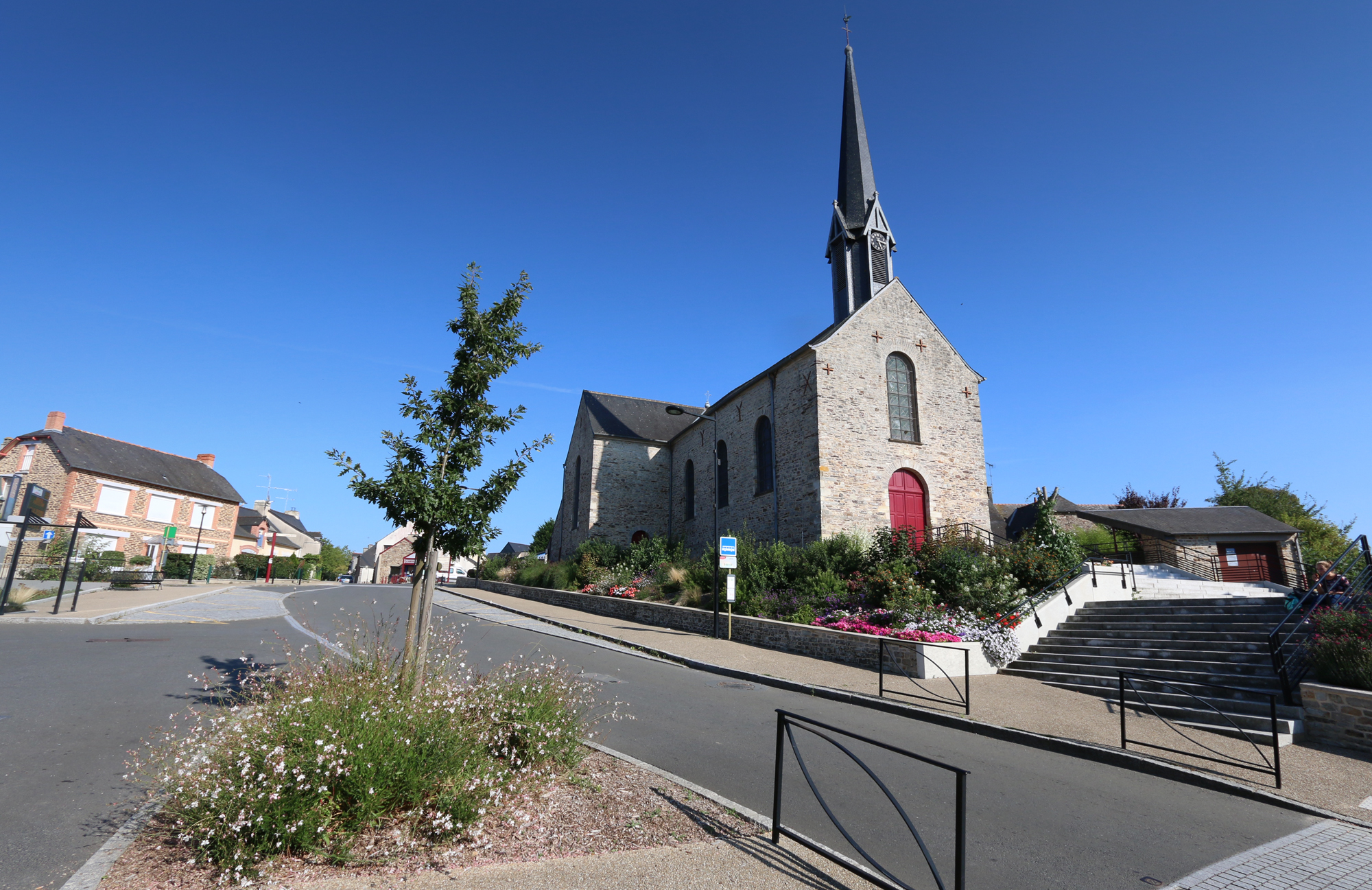
- The parish church of Notre-Dame de l'Assomption, in Crevin
- Location of Crevin
- Location within France Location within Brittany
- Coordinates: 47°56′17″N 1°39′38″W
- Country: France
- Region: Brittany
- Department: Ille-et-Vilaine
- Arrondissement: Redon
- Canton: Bain-de-Bretagne

Government
  - Mayor (2020–2026): Daniel Gendrot
- Area^{1}: 8.31 km^{2} (3.21 sq mi)
- Highest elevation: 111 m (364 ft)
- Lowest elevation: 50 m (160 ft)
- Population (2023): 2,819
  - Density: 339/km^{2} (879/sq mi)
- Time zone: UTC+01:00 (CET)
  - Summer (DST): UTC+02:00 (CEST)
- INSEE/Postal code: 35090 /35320
- ^{1} French Land Register data, which excludes lakes, ponds, glaciers > 1 km^{2} (0.386 sq mi or 247 acres) and river estuaries.

Crevin (French pronunciation: [kʁəvɛ̃]; Gallo: Créven, Breton: Kreven) is a commune in the Ille-et-Vilaine department in Brittany in northwestern France.

The commune is listed as a Village étape.

== Population ==
Inhabitants of Crevin are called Crevinois in French.

Historical population
| Year | Pop. | ±% p.a. |
|---|---|---|
| 1968 | 346 | — |
| 1975 | 456 | +4.02% |
| 1982 | 797 | +8.30% |
| 1990 | 1,247 | +5.76% |
| 1999 | 1,723 | +3.66% |
| 2007 | 2,472 | +4.62% |
| 2012 | 2,596 | +0.98% |
| 2017 | 2,828 | +1.73% |
| 2023 | 2,819 | −0.05% |
Source: INSEE

== See also ==
- Communes of the Ille-et-Vilaine department
