= Le Sel-de-Bretagne =

Le Sel-de-Bretagne Ar Sal (Breton)
- Commune
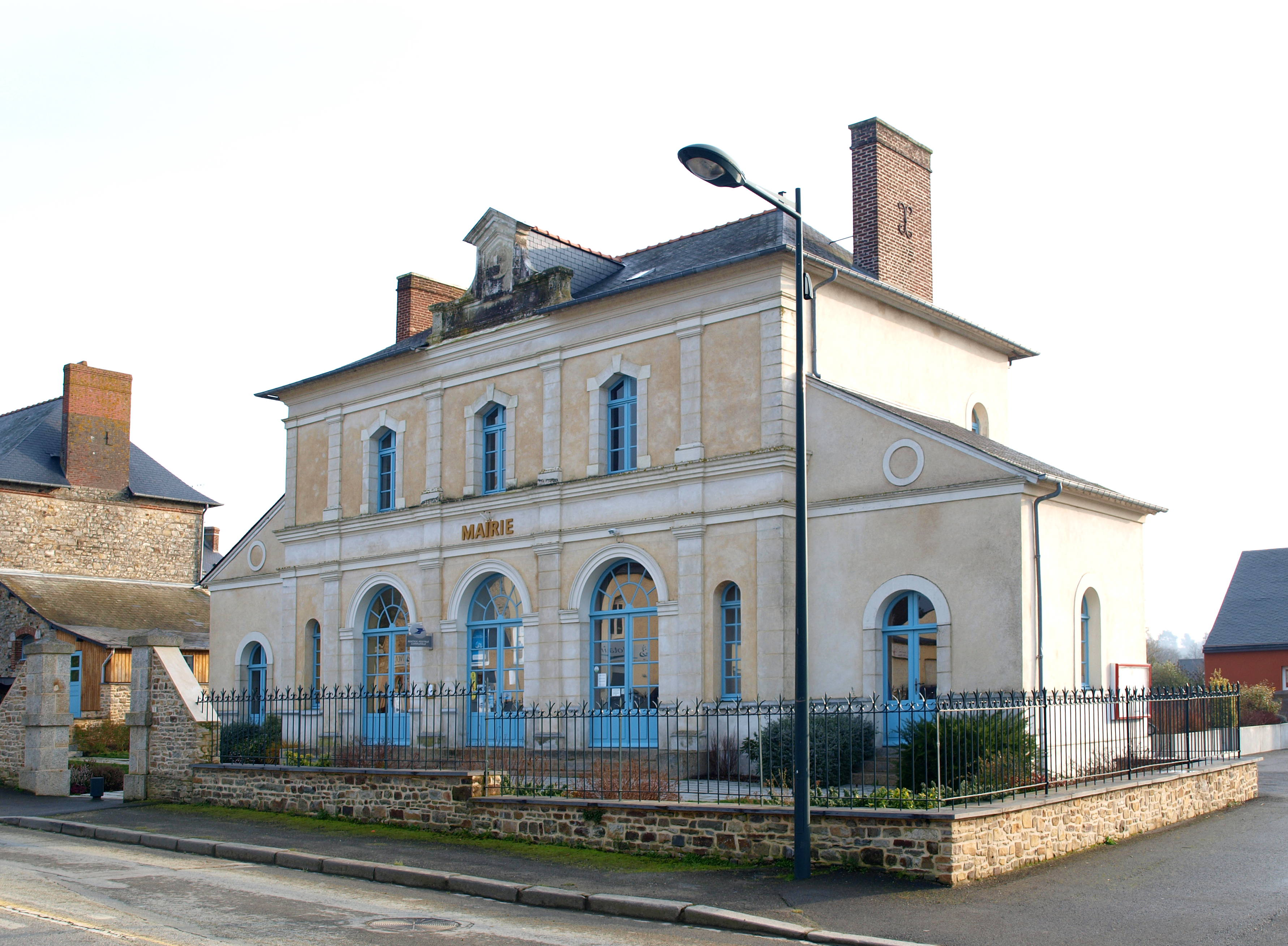
- The town hall of Sel-de-Bretagne
- Location of Le Sel-de-Bretagne
- Location within France Location within Brittany
- Coordinates: 47°53′47″N 1°36′33″W
- Country: France
- Region: Brittany
- Department: Ille-et-Vilaine
- Arrondissement: Redon
- Canton: Bain-de-Bretagne
- Intercommunality: Bretagne Porte de Loire

Government
  - Mayor (2022–2026): Christine Roger
- Area^{1}: 8.10 km^{2} (3.13 sq mi)
- Highest elevation: 107 m (351 ft)
- Lowest elevation: 37 m (121 ft)
- Population (2023): 1,117
  - Density: 138/km^{2} (357/sq mi)
- Time zone: UTC+01:00 (CET)
  - Summer (DST): UTC+02:00 (CEST)
- INSEE/Postal code: 35322 /35320
- ^{1} French Land Register data, which excludes lakes, ponds, glaciers > 1 km^{2} (0.386 sq mi or 247 acres) and river estuaries.

Le Sel-de-Bretagne (French pronunciation: [lə sɛl də bʁətaɲ], literally The Salt of Brittany; Breton: Ar Sal) is a commune in the Ille-et-Vilaine department in Brittany in northwestern France.

== Population ==
Inhabitants of Le Sel-de-Bretagne are called Sellois in French.

Historical population
Year	Pop.	±% p.a.
1968	456	—
1975	404	−1.71%
1982	451	+1.58%
1990	501	+1.32%
1999	514	+0.29%
2007	776	+5.28%
2012	951	+4.15%
2017	1,106	+3.07%
2023	1,117	+0.17%
Source: INSEE

== See also ==
- Communes of the Ille-et-Vilaine department
