= Semnon =

River in France

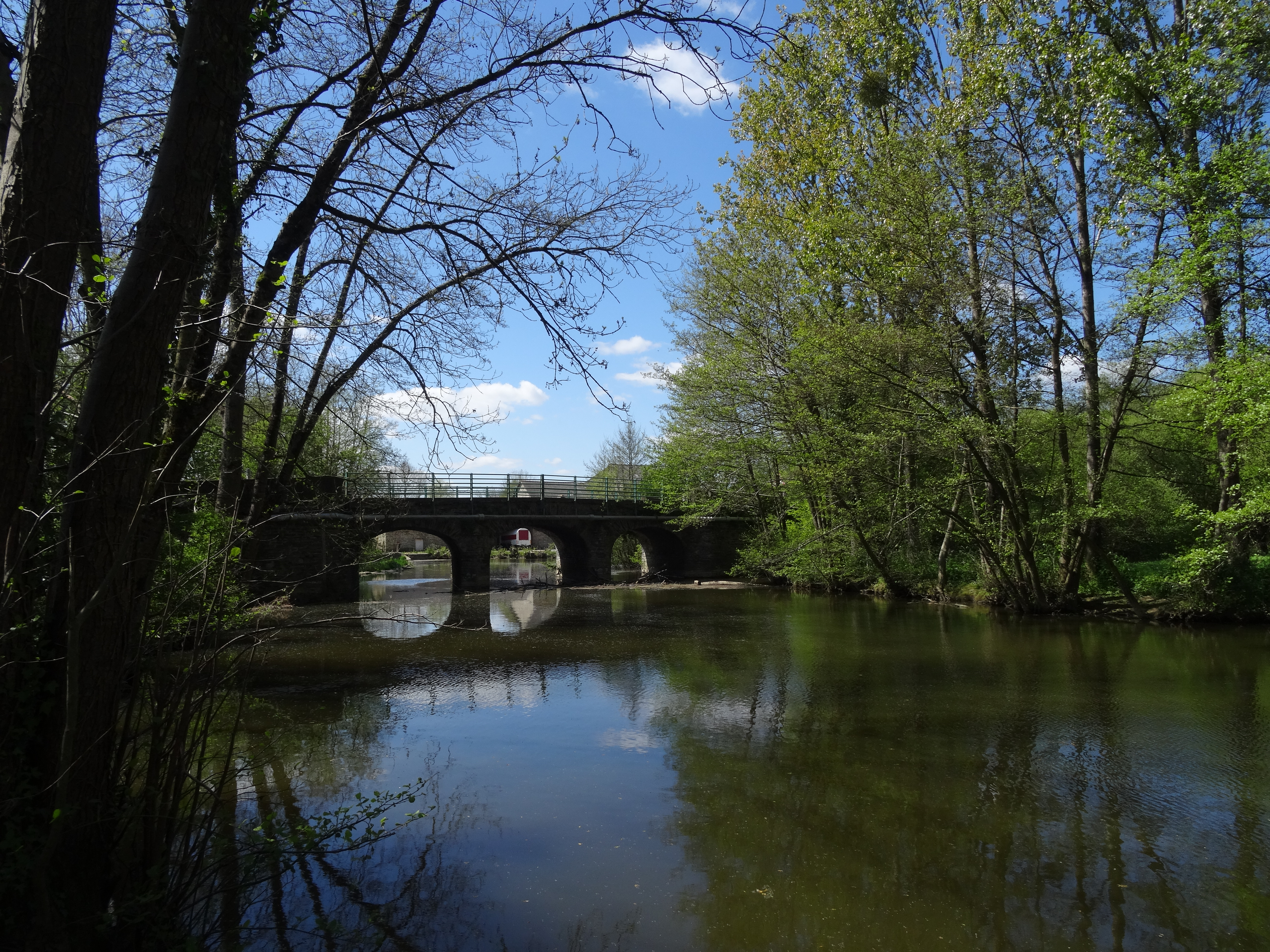
- The Semnon between Pléchâtel and Poligné.

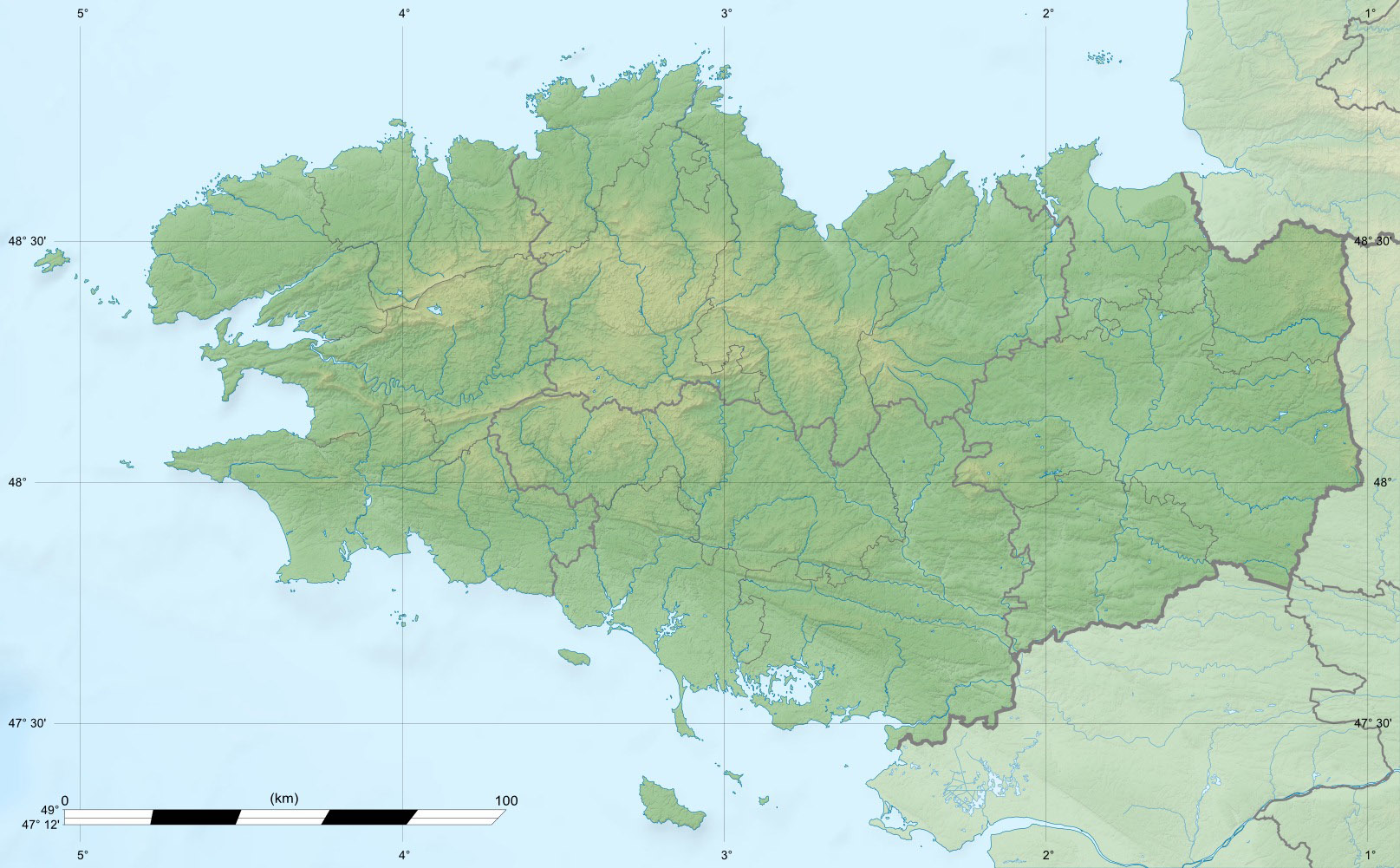
- Location within France Location within Brittany

Location
- Country: France

Physical characteristics
- Source
  - location: Congrier
  - coordinates: 47°47′30″N 01°08′34″W
  - elevation: 90 m (300 ft)
- Mouth
  - location: Vilaine
  - coordinates: 47°53′59″N 01°45′25″W
  - elevation: 7 m (23 ft)
- Length: 73.3 km (45.5 mi)
- Basin size: 400 km^{2} (150 sq mi)
- Discharge
  - average: 2.8 m^{3}/s (99 cu ft/s)

Basin features
- Progression: Vilaine→ Atlantic Ocean

The Semnon (French pronunciation: [sɛmnɔ̃]; Breton: Sevnon) is a 73.3 km (45.5 mi) long river in the Mayenne, Maine-et-Loire, Ille-et-Vilaine and Loire-Atlantique départements, northwestern France. Its source is in Congrier. It flows generally west-northwest. It is a left tributary of the Vilaine into which it flows between Pléchâtel and Bourg-des-Comptes.

== Départements and communes along its course ==
This list is ordered from source to mouth:

- Mayenne: Congrier, Saint-Erblon, Senonnes
- Maine-et-Loire: Pouancé
- Ille-et-Vilaine: Eancé, Martigné-Ferchaud
- Loire-Atlantique: Fercé
- Ille-et-Vilaine: Thourie
- Loire-Atlantique: Soulvache
- Ille-et-Vilaine: Teillay, Ercé-en-Lamée, Lalleu, Tresbœuf, La Bosse-de-Bretagne, Bain-de-Bretagne, Pancé, Pléchâtel, Poligné, Bourg-des-Comptes
