= Ercé-en-Lamée =

Ercé-en-Lamée Erczaé (Gallo) Herzieg-Mez (Breton)
- Commune
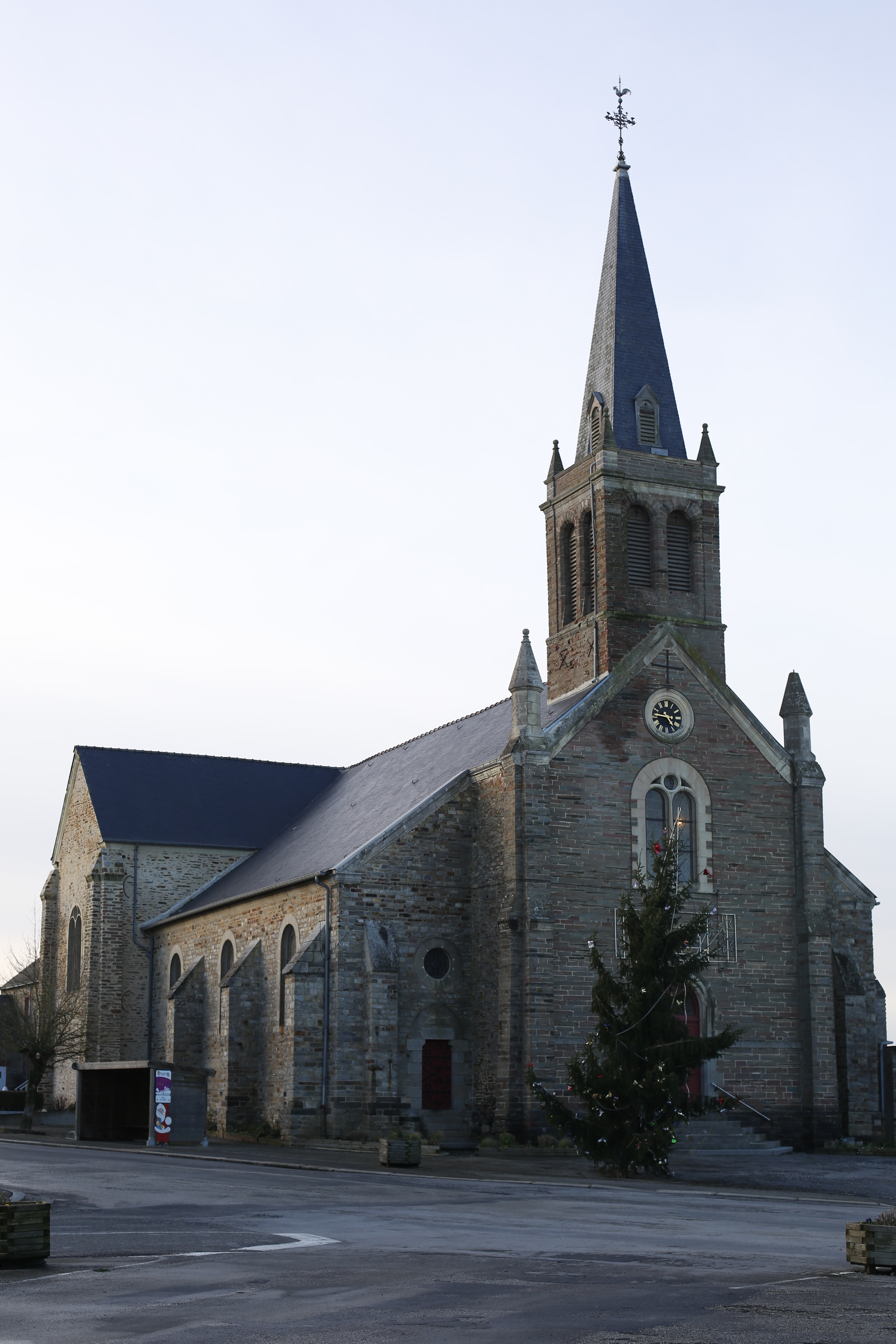
- The church of Saint-Jean-Baptiste
- Location of Ercé-en-Lamée
- Location within France Location within Brittany
- Coordinates: 47°49′51″N 1°33′28″W
- Country: France
- Region: Brittany
- Department: Ille-et-Vilaine
- Arrondissement: Redon
- Canton: Bain-de-Bretagne
- Intercommunality: Bretagne Porte de Loire

Government
  - Mayor (2020–2026): Isabelle Bertin
- Area^{1}: 39.21 km^{2} (15.14 sq mi)
- Highest elevation: 107 m (351 ft)
- Lowest elevation: 23 m (75 ft)
- Population (2023): 1,566
  - Density: 39.94/km^{2} (103.4/sq mi)
- Time zone: UTC+01:00 (CET)
  - Summer (DST): UTC+02:00 (CEST)
- INSEE/Postal code: 35106 /35620
- ^{1} French Land Register data, which excludes lakes, ponds, glaciers > 1 km^{2} (0.386 sq mi or 247 acres) and river estuaries.

Ercé-en-Lamée (French pronunciation: [ɛʁse ɑ̃ lame], lit. 'Ercé in Lamée'; Gallo: Erczaé, Breton: Herzieg-Mez) is a commune in the Ille-et-Vilaine department in Brittany in northwestern France.

== Geography ==
The river Semnon forms all of the commune's northern border.

== Population ==
Inhabitants of Ercé-en-Lamée are called Ercéens in French.

Historical population
Year	Pop.	±% p.a.
1968	1,542	—
1975	1,356	−1.82%
1982	1,253	−1.12%
1990	1,145	−1.12%
1999	1,156	+0.11%
2007	1,344	+1.90%
2012	1,508	+2.33%
2017	1,497	−0.15%
2023	1,566	+0.75%
Source: INSEE

== See also ==
- Communes of the Ille-et-Vilaine department
