= Le Petit-Fougeray =

Le Petit-Fougeray Le Petit-Foujeraè (Gallo) Felgerieg-Vihan (Breton)
- Commune
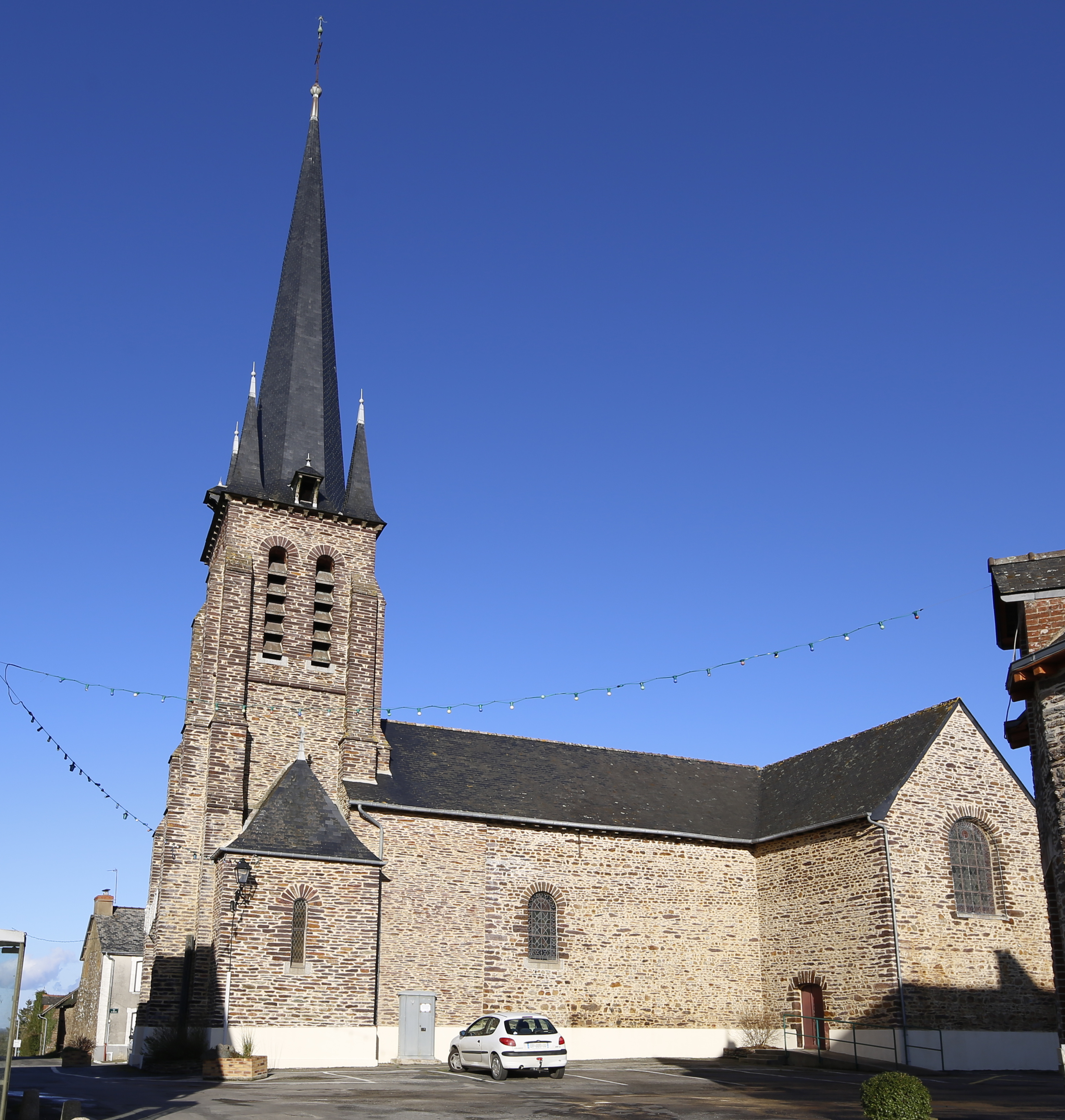
- The church of Sacré-Cœur
- Location of Le Petit-Fougeray
- Location within France Location within Brittany
- Coordinates: 47°55′43″N 1°36′27″W
- Country: France
- Region: Brittany
- Department: Ille-et-Vilaine
- Arrondissement: Redon
- Canton: Bain-de-Bretagne
- Intercommunality: Bretagne Porte de Loire

Government
  - Mayor (2020–2026): Christophe Brullé
- Area^{1}: 8.95 km^{2} (3.46 sq mi)
- Highest elevation: 111 m (364 ft)
- Lowest elevation: 44 m (144 ft)
- Population (2023): 901
  - Density: 101/km^{2} (261/sq mi)
- Time zone: UTC+01:00 (CET)
  - Summer (DST): UTC+02:00 (CEST)
- INSEE/Postal code: 35218 /35320
- ^{1} French Land Register data, which excludes lakes, ponds, glaciers > 1 km^{2} (0.386 sq mi or 247 acres) and river estuaries.

Le Petit-Fougeray (French pronunciation: [lə pəti fuʒʁɛ]; Gallo: Le Petit-Foujeraè, Breton: Felgerieg-Vihan) is a commune in the Ille-et-Vilaine department of Brittany in northwestern France.

== Population ==
Inhabitants of Le Petit-Fougeray are called in French foucerays.

Historical population
Year	Pop.	±% p.a.
1968	347	—
1975	297	−2.20%
1982	359	+2.75%
1990	387	+0.94%
1999	461	+1.96%
2007	676	+4.90%
2012	904	+5.98%
2017	894	−0.22%
2023	901	+0.13%
Source: INSEE

== See also ==
- Communes of the Ille-et-Vilaine department
