= Teillay =

Teillay Tilheg (Breton)
- Commune
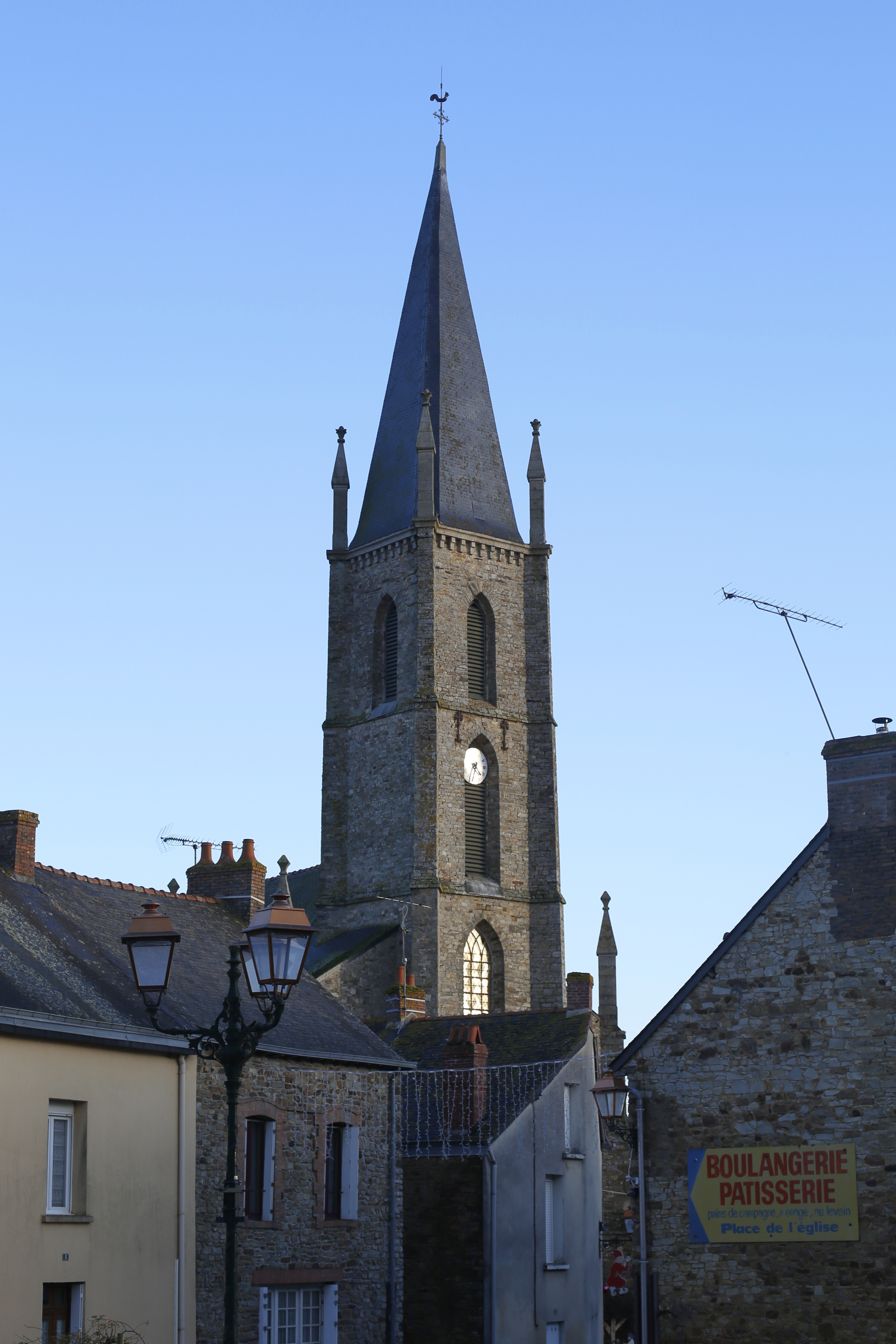
- The church of Notre-Dame-de-l'Assomption

- Coat of arms
- Location of Teillay
- Location within France Location within Brittany
- Coordinates: 47°48′29″N 1°32′13″W
- Country: France
- Region: Brittany
- Department: Ille-et-Vilaine
- Arrondissement: Redon
- Canton: Bain-de-Bretagne

Government
  - Mayor (2020–2026): Yvon Mellet
- Area^{1}: 26.21 km^{2} (10.12 sq mi)
- Highest elevation: 98 m (322 ft)
- Lowest elevation: 37 m (121 ft)
- Population (2023): 1,117
  - Density: 42.62/km^{2} (110.4/sq mi)
- Time zone: UTC+01:00 (CET)
  - Summer (DST): UTC+02:00 (CEST)
- INSEE/Postal code: 35332 /35620
- ^{1} French Land Register data, which excludes lakes, ponds, glaciers > 1 km^{2} (0.386 sq mi or 247 acres) and river estuaries.

Teillay (French pronunciation: [tɛjɛ]; Breton: Tilheg) is a commune in the Ille-et-Vilaine department in Brittany in northwestern France.

== Geography ==
The Brutz forms all of the commune's eastern border, then flows into the Semnon, which forms part of its northeastern border.

== Population ==
Inhabitants of Teillay are called Teillacois in French.

Historical population
Year	Pop.	±% p.a.
1968	1,066	—
1975	948	−1.66%
1982	829	−1.90%
1990	786	−0.66%
1999	786	+0.00%
2007	930	+2.13%
2012	1,051	+2.48%
2017	1,061	+0.19%
2023	1,117	+0.86%
Source: INSEE

== See also ==
- Tombe à la fille
- Communes of the Ille-et-Vilaine department
