= La Dominelais =

La Dominelais Doveneleg (Breton)
- Commune
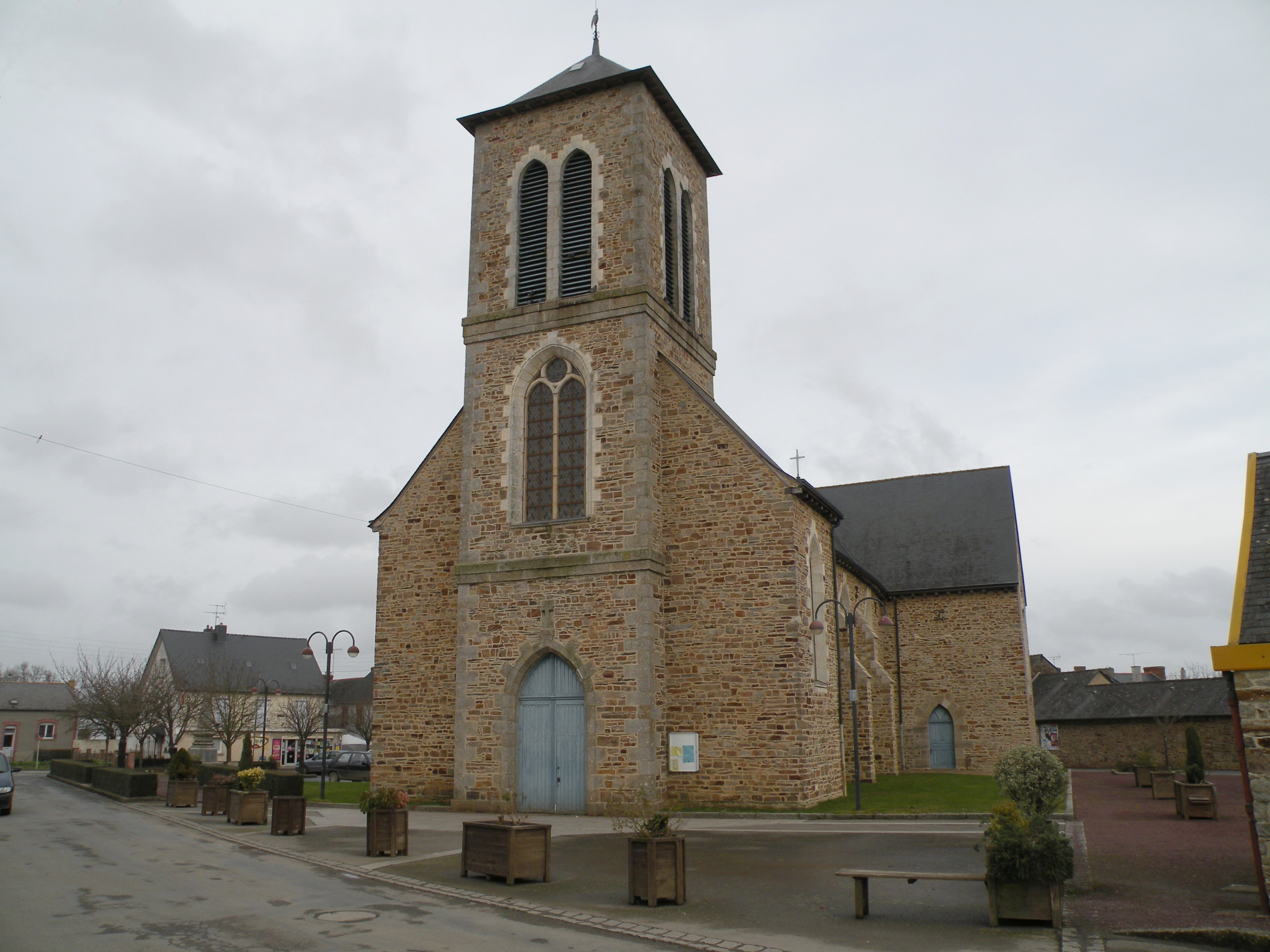
- The church in La Dominelais
- Location of La Dominelais
- Location within France Location within Brittany
- Coordinates: 47°45′48″N 1°41′14″W
- Country: France
- Region: Brittany
- Department: Ille-et-Vilaine
- Arrondissement: Redon
- Canton: Bain-de-Bretagne

Government
  - Mayor (2020–2026): Jean-Éric Berton
- Area^{1}: 32.45 km^{2} (12.53 sq mi)
- Highest elevation: 105 m (344 ft)
- Lowest elevation: 22 m (72 ft)
- Population (2023): 1,424
  - Density: 43.88/km^{2} (113.7/sq mi)
- Time zone: UTC+01:00 (CET)
  - Summer (DST): UTC+02:00 (CEST)
- INSEE/Postal code: 35098 /35390
- ^{1} French Land Register data, which excludes lakes, ponds, glaciers > 1 km^{2} (0.386 sq mi or 247 acres) and river estuaries.

La Dominelais (French pronunciation: [la dɔminlɛ]; Breton: Doveneleg) is a commune in the Ille-et-Vilaine department of Brittany in north-western France.

== Population ==
Inhabitants of La Dominelais are called in French dominelaisiens.

Historical population
Year	Pop.	±% p.a.
1968	887	—
1975	806	−1.36%
1982	796	−0.18%
1990	829	+0.51%
1999	906	+0.99%
2007	1,186	+3.42%
2012	1,288	+1.66%
2017	1,377	+1.35%
2023	1,424	+0.56%
Source: INSEE

== See also ==
- Communes of the Ille-et-Vilaine department
