= Grand-Fougeray =

Grand-Fougeray Felgerieg-Veur (Breton)
- Commune
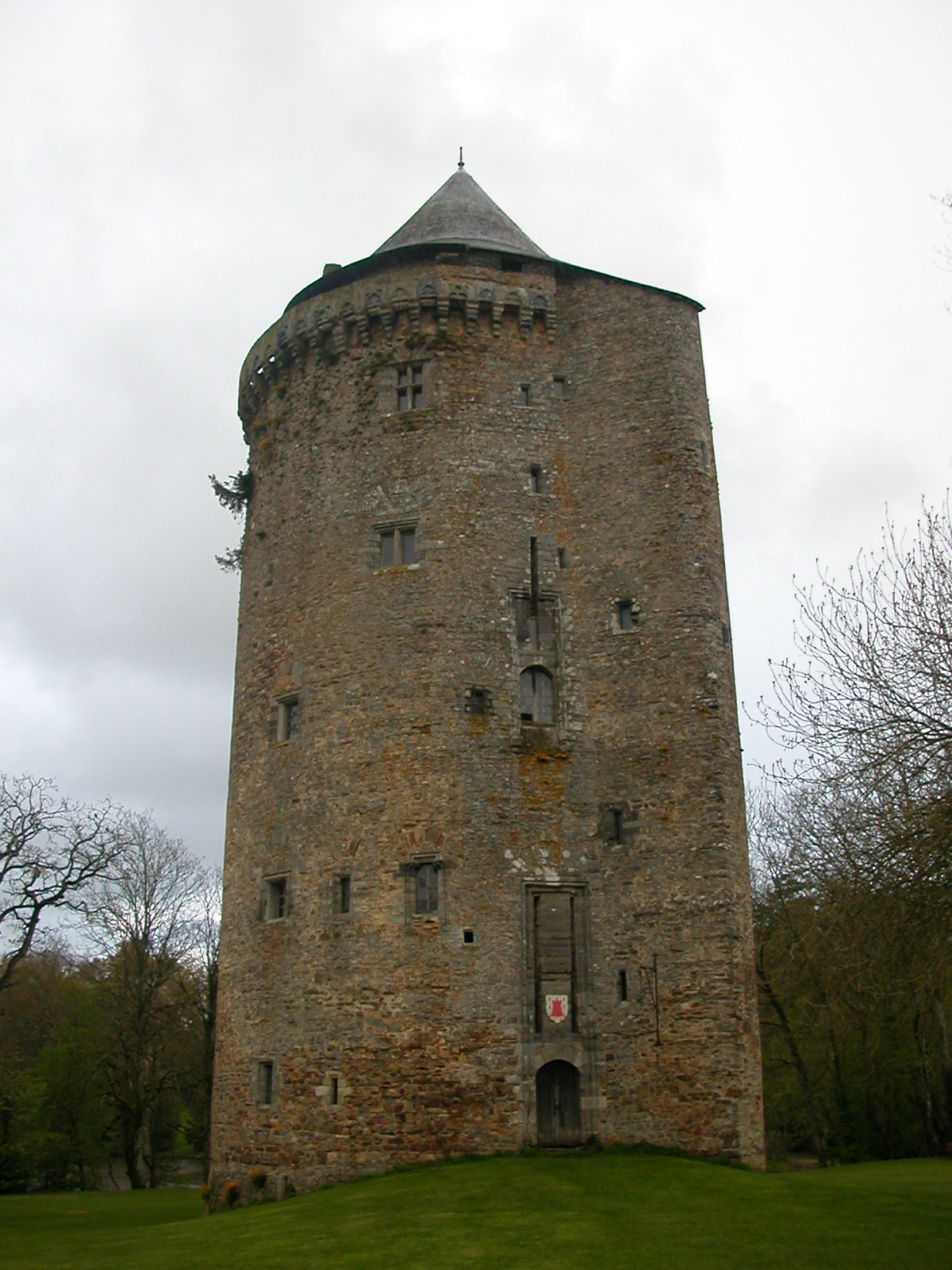
- Tower of the old chateau

- Coat of arms
- Location of Grand-Fougeray
- Location within France Location within Brittany
- Coordinates: 47°43′26″N 1°43′55″W
- Country: France
- Region: Brittany
- Department: Ille-et-Vilaine
- Arrondissement: Redon
- Canton: Bain-de-Bretagne
- Intercommunality: Bretagne Porte de Loire

Government
  - Mayor (2020–2026): Nadine Dréan
- Area^{1}: 55.42 km^{2} (21.40 sq mi)
- Highest elevation: 92 m (302 ft)
- Lowest elevation: 3 m (9.8 ft)
- Population (2023): 2,584
  - Density: 46.63/km^{2} (120.8/sq mi)
- Time zone: UTC+01:00 (CET)
  - Summer (DST): UTC+02:00 (CEST)
- INSEE/Postal code: 35124 /35390
- ^{1} French Land Register data, which excludes lakes, ponds, glaciers > 1 km^{2} (0.386 sq mi or 247 acres) and river estuaries.

Grand-Fougeray (French pronunciation: [gʁɑ̃ fuʒʁɛ]; Breton: Felgerieg-Veur) is a commune in the Ille-et-Vilaine department of Brittany in north-western France.

The commune is listed as a Village étape.

== Geography ==
The river Chère forms most of the commune's southern border.

== Population ==
Inhabitants of Grand-Fougeray are called Fulkériens in French.

Historical population
Year	Pop.	±% p.a.
1968	2,219	—
1975	2,008	−1.42%
1982	2,032	+0.17%
1990	1,995	−0.23%
1999	1,970	−0.14%
2007	2,245	+1.65%
2012	2,393	+1.29%
2017	2,445	+0.43%
2023	2,584	+0.93%
Source: INSEE

== See also ==
- Communes of the Ille-et-Vilaine department
