= La Bosse-de-Bretagne =

La Bosse-de-Bretagne La Bocz (Gallo) Bosenn (Breton)
- Commune
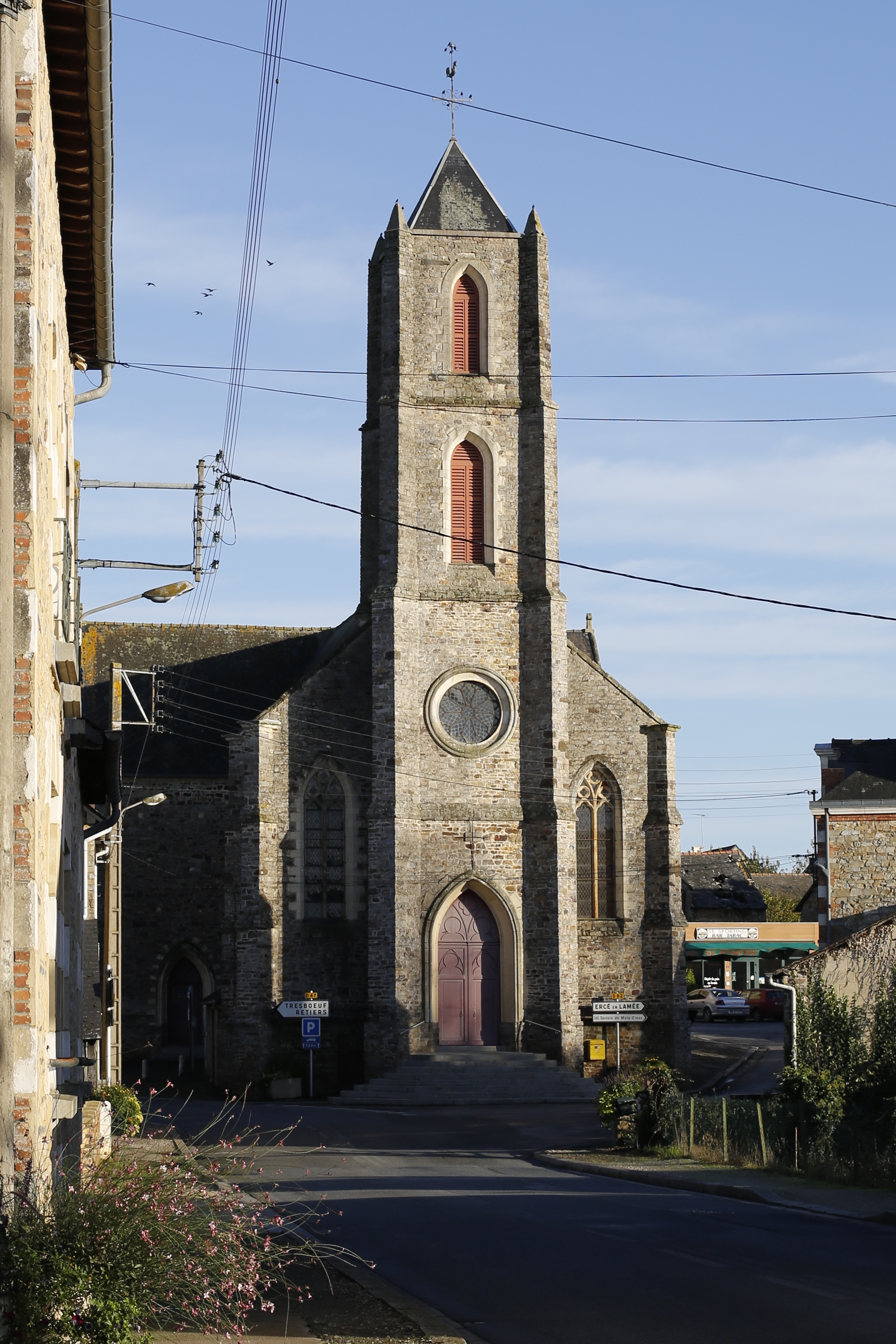
- The church of La Bosse-de-Bretagne
- Location of La Bosse-de-Bretagne
- Location within France Location within Brittany
- Coordinates: 47°52′12″N 1°35′51″W
- Country: France
- Region: Brittany
- Department: Ille-et-Vilaine
- Arrondissement: Redon
- Canton: Bain-de-Bretagne
- Intercommunality: Bretagne Porte de Loire

Government
  - Mayor (2020–2026): Jean-Charles Hamon
- Area^{1}: 10.21 km^{2} (3.94 sq mi)
- Highest elevation: 106 m (348 ft)
- Lowest elevation: 22 m (72 ft)
- Population (2023): 696
  - Density: 68.2/km^{2} (177/sq mi)
- Time zone: UTC+01:00 (CET)
  - Summer (DST): UTC+02:00 (CEST)
- INSEE/Postal code: 35030 /35320
- ^{1} French Land Register data, which excludes lakes, ponds, glaciers > 1 km^{2} (0.386 sq mi or 247 acres) and river estuaries.

La Bosse-de-Bretagne (French pronunciation: [la bɔs də bʁətaɲ]; Breton: Bosenn; Gallo: La Bocz) is a commune in the Ille-et-Vilaine department in Brittany in northwestern France.

== Geography ==
The river Semnon forms most of the commune's southern border.

== Population ==
Historical population
Year	Pop.	±% p.a.
1968	495	—
1975	437	−1.76%
1982	390	−1.61%
1990	388	−0.06%
1999	386	−0.06%
2007	554	+4.62%
2012	621	+2.31%
2017	649	+0.89%
2023	696	+1.17%
Source: INSEE

Inhabitants of La Bosse-de-Bretagne are called Bosséens in French.

== See also ==
- Communes of the Ille-et-Vilaine department
