= Saint-Sulpice-des-Landes, Ille-et-Vilaine =

Saint-Sulpice-des-Landes Sant-Suleg-al-Lann (Breton)
- Commune
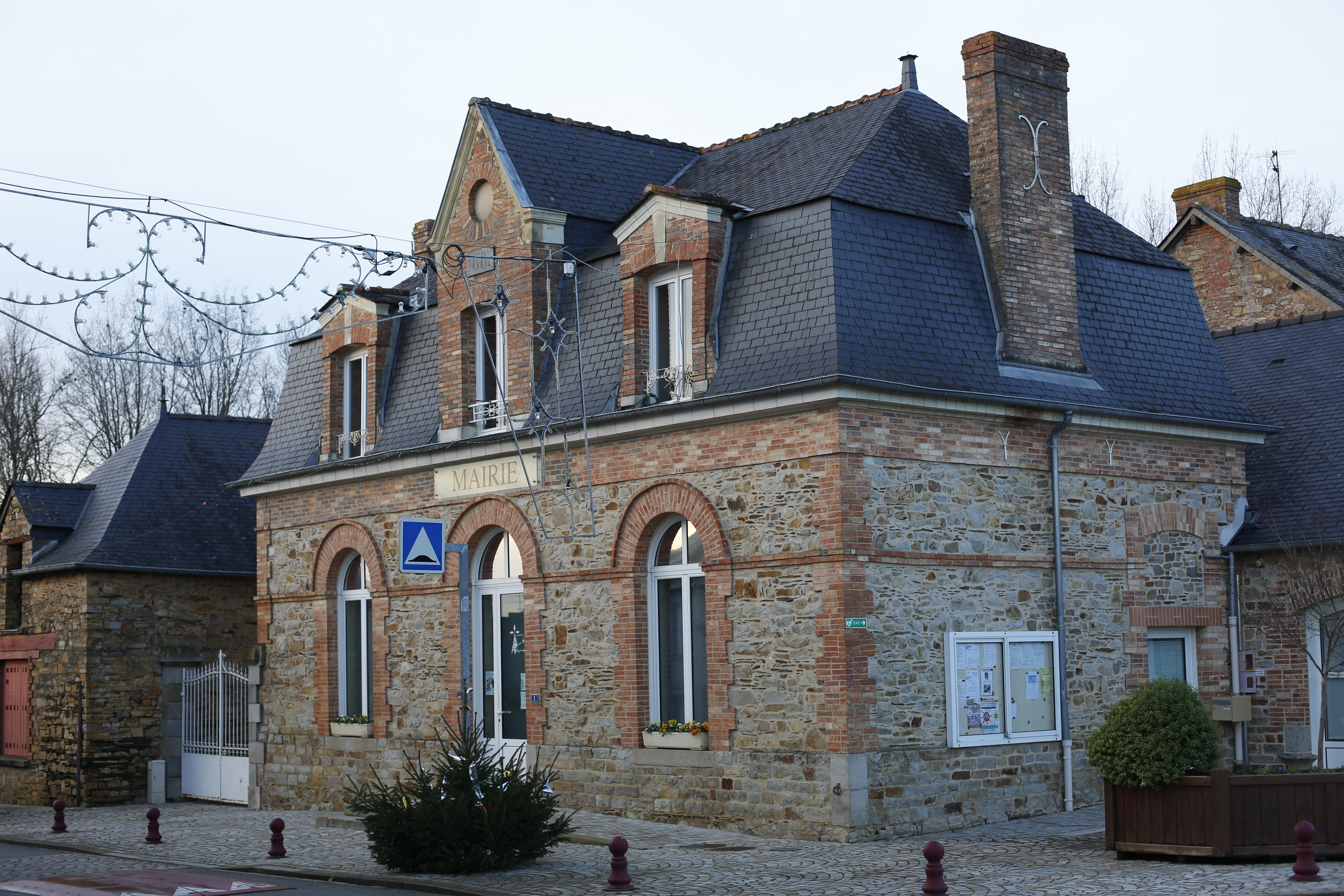
- The town hall of Saint-Sulpice-des-Landes
- Location of Saint-Sulpice-des-Landes
- Location within France Location within Brittany
- Coordinates: 47°46′02″N 1°37′18″W
- Country: France
- Region: Brittany
- Department: Ille-et-Vilaine
- Arrondissement: Redon
- Canton: Bain-de-Bretagne

Government
  - Mayor (2024–2026): Charlotte Merault
- Area^{1}: 11.19 km^{2} (4.32 sq mi)
- Highest elevation: 99 m (325 ft)
- Lowest elevation: 28 m (92 ft)
- Population (2023): 820
  - Density: 73/km^{2} (190/sq mi)
- Time zone: UTC+01:00 (CET)
  - Summer (DST): UTC+02:00 (CEST)
- INSEE/Postal code: 35316 /35390
- ^{1} French Land Register data, which excludes lakes, ponds, glaciers > 1 km^{2} (0.386 sq mi or 247 acres) and river estuaries.

Saint-Sulpice-des-Landes (French pronunciation: [sɛ̃ sylpis de lɑ̃d]; Breton: Sant-Suleg-al-Lann) is a commune in the Ille-et-Vilaine department in Brittany in northwestern France.

== Population ==
Inhabitants of Saint-Sulpice-des-Landes are called sulpiciens in French.

Historical population
Year	Pop.	±% p.a.
1968	643	—
1975	608	−0.80%
1982	603	−0.12%
1990	599	−0.08%
1999	562	−0.71%
2007	737	+3.45%
2012	781	+1.17%
2017	809	+0.71%
2023	820	+0.23%
Source: INSEE

== See also ==
- Communes of the Ille-et-Vilaine department
