= La Noë-Blanche =

La Noë-Blanche Ar Wazh-Wenn (Breton)
- Commune
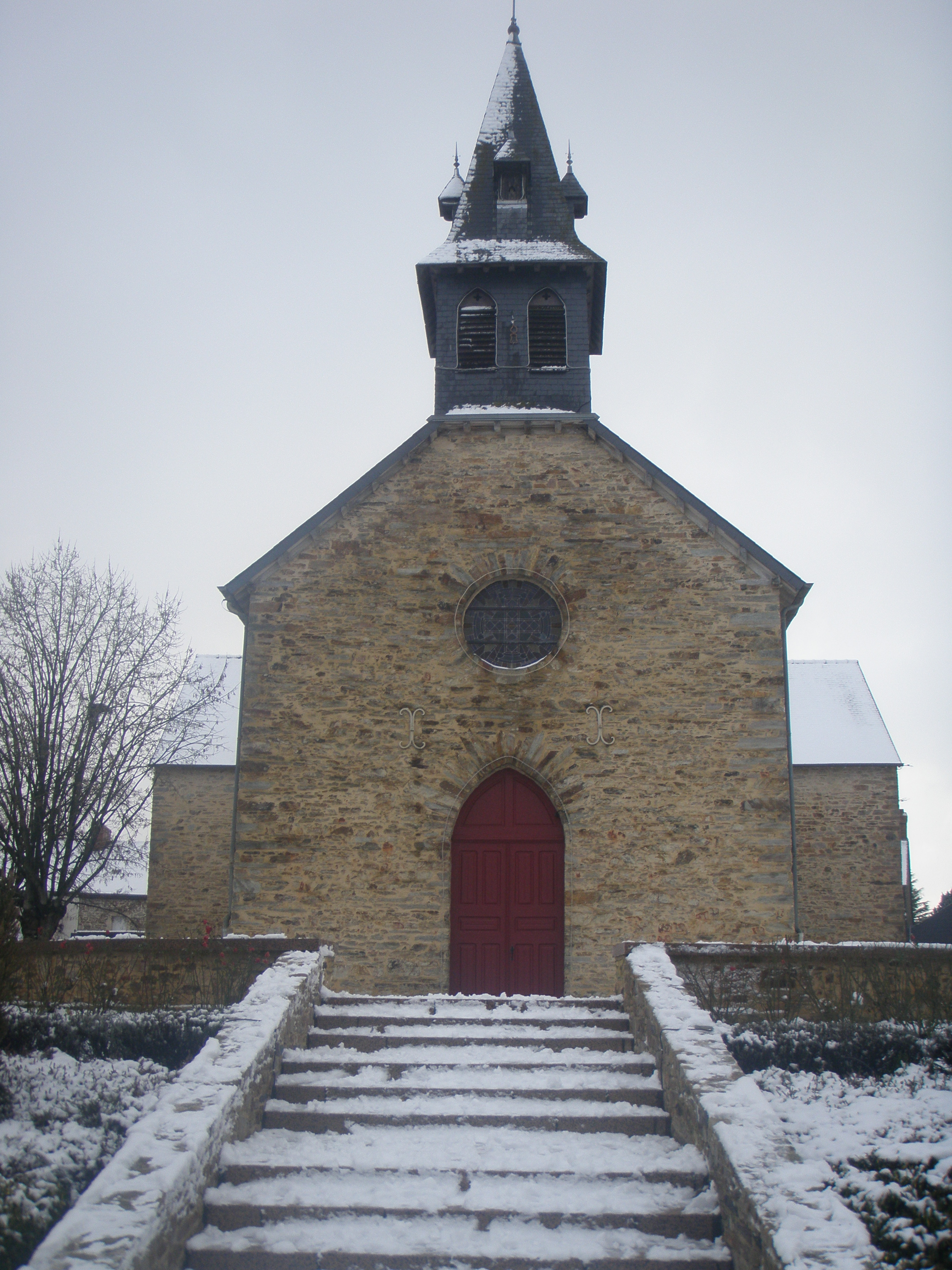
- The church of La Noë-Blanche
- Location of La Noë-Blanche
- Location within France Location within Brittany
- Coordinates: 47°48′11″N 1°44′24″W
- Country: France
- Region: Brittany
- Department: Ille-et-Vilaine
- Arrondissement: Redon
- Canton: Bain-de-Bretagne
- Intercommunality: Bretagne Porte de Loire

Government
  - Mayor (2020–2026): Frédéric Martin
- Area^{1}: 23.18 km^{2} (8.95 sq mi)
- Highest elevation: 95 m (312 ft)
- Lowest elevation: 18 m (59 ft)
- Population (2023): 1,002
  - Density: 43.23/km^{2} (112.0/sq mi)
- Time zone: UTC+01:00 (CET)
  - Summer (DST): UTC+02:00 (CEST)
- INSEE/Postal code: 35202 /35470
- ^{1} French Land Register data, which excludes lakes, ponds, glaciers > 1 km^{2} (0.386 sq mi or 247 acres) and river estuaries.

La Noë-Blanche (French pronunciation: [la nɔe blɑ̃ʃ]; Breton: Ar Wazh-Wenn) is a commune in the Ille-et-Vilaine department of Brittany in northwestern France.

== Population ==
Inhabitants of La Noë-Blanche are called in French nautalbanais.

Historical population
Year	Pop.	±% p.a.
1968	744	—
1975	730	−0.27%
1982	878	+2.67%
1990	862	−0.23%
1999	828	−0.45%
2007	987	+2.22%
2012	965	−0.45%
2017	1,002	+0.76%
2023	1,002	+0.00%
Source: INSEE

== See also ==
- Communes of the Ille-et-Vilaine department
