= Canton of Pipriac =

Coordinates: 47.8173°N 1.9270°W

Pipriac
- Former canton
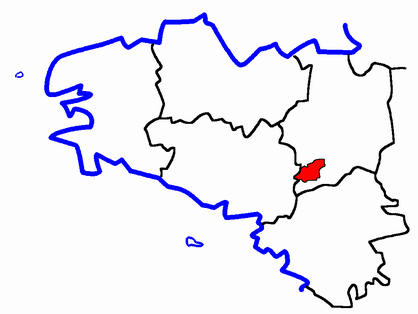
- Country: France
- Region: Brittany
- Department: Ille-et-Vilaine
- No. of communes: {{{nbcomm}}}
- Disbanded: 2015
- Area: 245 km^{2} (95 sq mi)
- Population (2012): 14,274
  - Density: 58.3/km^{2} (151/sq mi)

The Canton of Pipriac is a former canton of France, in the Ille-et-Vilaine département, located in the southwest of the department. It was disbanded following the French canton reorganisation which came into effect in March 2015. It consisted of 9 communes, and its population was 14,274 in 2012.
