= Canton of Grand-Fougeray =

Coordinates: 47.7465°N 1.7163°W

Grand-Fougeray
- Former canton
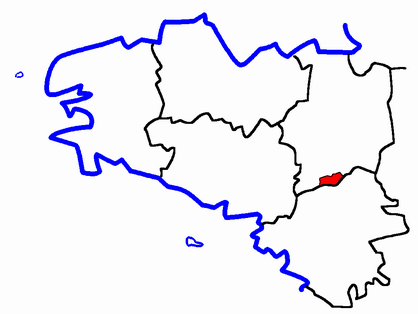
- Country: France
- Region: Brittany
- Department: Ille-et-Vilaine
- No. of communes: {{{nbcomm}}}
- Disbanded: 2015
- Area: 128 km^{2} (49 sq mi)
- Population (2012): 5,461
  - Density: 42.7/km^{2} (110/sq mi)

The Canton of Grand-Fougeray is a former canton of France, in the Ille-et-Vilaine département, located in the southeast of the department. It was disbanded following the French canton reorganisation which came into effect in March 2015. It consisted of 4 communes, and its population was 5,461 in 2012.
