= Canton of Le Sel-de-Bretagne =

Coordinates: 47.8991347°N 1.642276°W

Le Sel-de-Bretagne
- Former canton
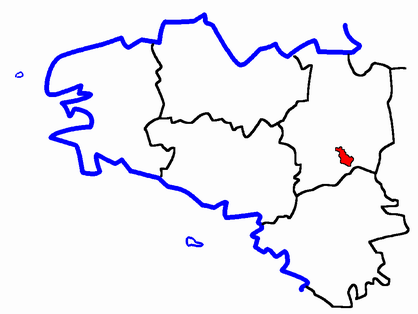
- Country: France
- Region: Brittany
- Department: Ille-et-Vilaine
- No. of communes: {{{nbcomm}}}
- Disbanded: 2015
- Area: 108 km^{2} (42 sq mi)
- Population (2012): 7,255
  - Density: 67.2/km^{2} (174/sq mi)

The Canton of Le Sel-de-Bretagne is a former canton of France, in the Ille-et-Vilaine département, located in the south of the department. It was disbanded following the French canton reorganisation which came into effect in March 2015. It consisted of 8 communes, and its population was 7,255 in 2012.
