= Canton of Bain-de-Bretagne =

Coordinates: 47.8639°N 1.6665°W

Bain-de-Bretagne
- Canton
- Country: France
- Region: Brittany
- Department: Ille-et-Vilaine
- No. of communes: {{{nbcomm}}}
- Area: 461.85 km^{2} (178.32 sq mi)
- Population (2023): 32,996
  - Density: 71.443/km^{2} (185.04/sq mi)
- INSEE code: 35 02

The Canton of Bain-de-Bretagne is a canton of France, in the Ille-et-Vilaine département, located in the southeast of the department. At the French canton reorganisation which came into effect in March 2015, the canton was expanded from 9 to 20 communes:

- Bain-de-Bretagne
- La Bosse-de-Bretagne
- Chanteloup
- La Couyère
- Crevin
- La Dominelais
- Ercé-en-Lamée
- Grand-Fougeray
- Lalleu
- La Noë-Blanche
- Pancé
- Le Petit-Fougeray
- Pléchâtel
- Poligné
- Saint-Sulpice-des-Landes
- Sainte-Anne-sur-Vilaine
- Saulnières
- Le Sel-de-Bretagne
- Teillay
- Tresbœuf
