= Tresbœuf =

Tresbœuf Trébeu (Gallo) Trevo (Breton)
- Commune
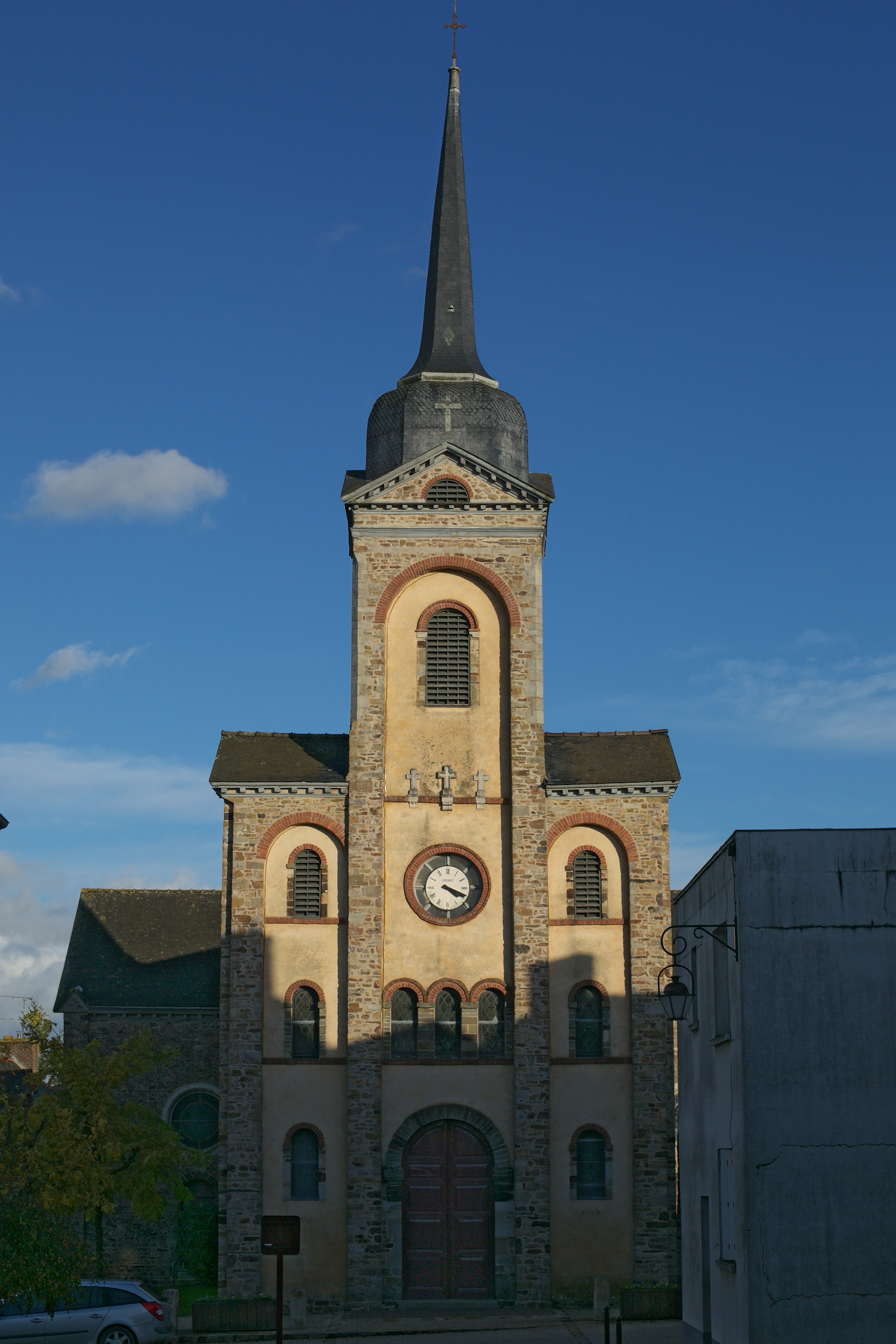
- The church in Tresbœuf
- Location of Tresbœuf
- Location within France Location within Brittany
- Coordinates: 47°53′00″N 1°32′41″W
- Country: France
- Region: Brittany
- Department: Ille-et-Vilaine
- Arrondissement: Redon
- Canton: Bain-de-Bretagne
- Intercommunality: Bretagne Porte de Loire

Government
  - Mayor (2020–2026): Laurence Roux
- Area^{1}: 25.33 km^{2} (9.78 sq mi)
- Highest elevation: 113 m (371 ft)
- Lowest elevation: 25 m (82 ft)
- Population (2023): 1,234
  - Density: 48.72/km^{2} (126.2/sq mi)
- Time zone: UTC+01:00 (CET)
  - Summer (DST): UTC+02:00 (CEST)
- INSEE/Postal code: 35343 /35320
- ^{1} French Land Register data, which excludes lakes, ponds, glaciers > 1 km^{2} (0.386 sq mi or 247 acres) and river estuaries.

Tresbœuf (French pronunciation: [tʁɛbœf]; Gallo: Trébeu, Breton: Trevo) is a commune in the Ille-et-Vilaine department of Brittany in northwestern France.

== Geography ==
The river Semnon forms part of the commune's southern border.

== Population ==
People from Tresbœuf are called tresbourgeois in French.

Historical population
Year	Pop.	±% p.a.
1968	916	—
1975	860	−0.90%
1982	856	−0.07%
1990	878	+0.32%
1999	926	+0.59%
2007	1,148	+2.72%
2012	1,227	+1.34%
2017	1,255	+0.45%
2023	1,234	−0.28%
Source: INSEE

== See also ==
- Communes of the Ille-et-Vilaine department
