= Saint-Erblon, Mayenne =

Saint-Erblon
- Commune
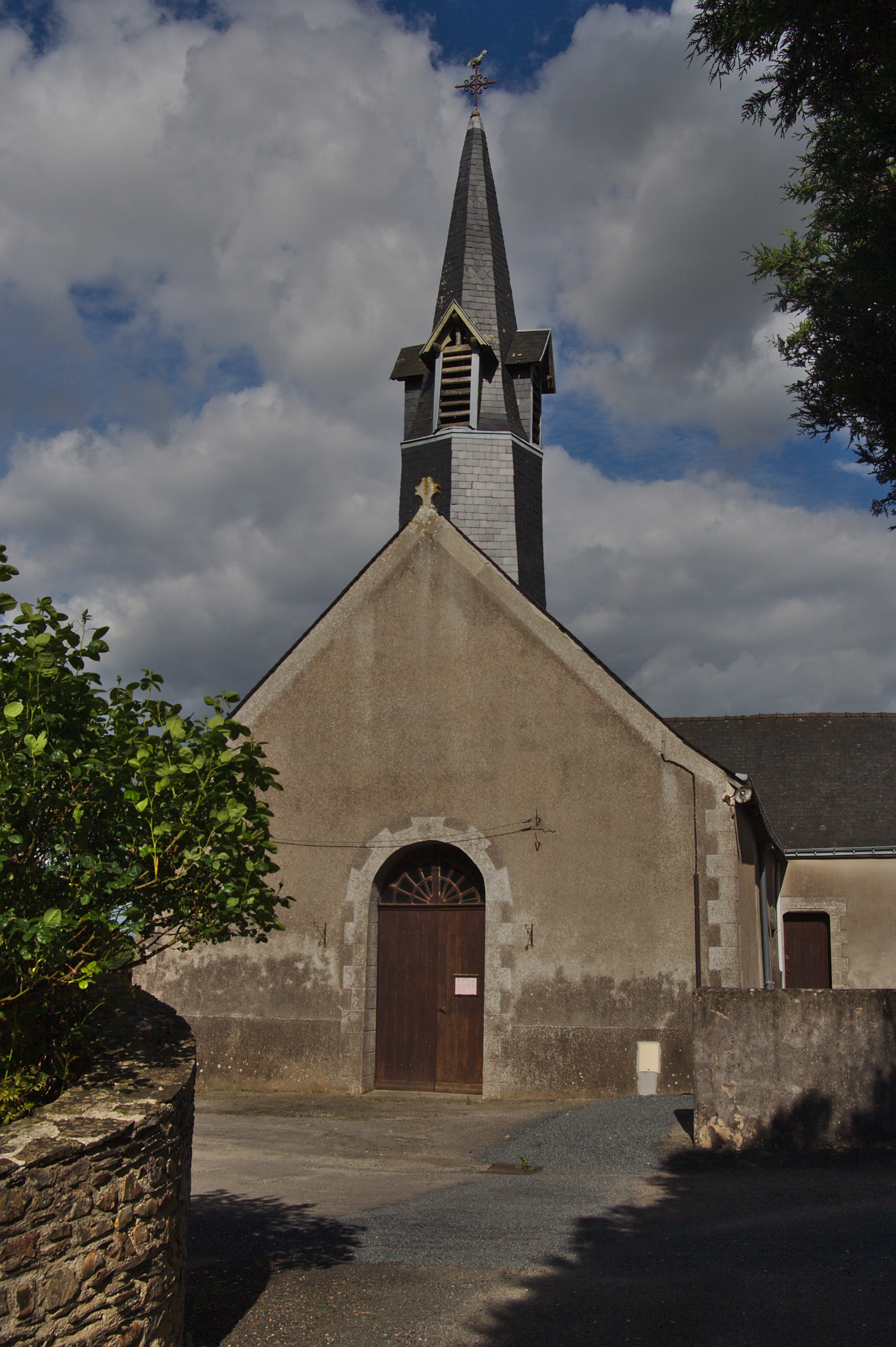
- The church in Saint-Erblon
- Location of Saint-Erblon
- Location within France Location within Pays de la Loire
- Coordinates: 47°47′17″N 1°09′59″W
- Country: France
- Region: Pays de la Loire
- Department: Mayenne
- Arrondissement: Château-Gontier
- Canton: Cossé-le-Vivien
- Intercommunality: Pays de Craon

Government
  - Mayor (2020–2026): Olivier Gaucher
- Area^{1}: 5.68 km^{2} (2.19 sq mi)
- Elevation: 101 m (331 ft)
- Highest elevation: 106 m (348 ft)
- Lowest elevation: 65 m (213 ft)
- Population (2023): 153
  - Density: 26.9/km^{2} (69.8/sq mi)
- Time zone: UTC+01:00 (CET)
  - Summer (DST): UTC+02:00 (CEST)
- INSEE/Postal code: 53214 /53390
- ^{1} French Land Register data, which excludes lakes, ponds, glaciers > 1 km^{2} (0.386 sq mi or 247 acres) and river estuaries.

Saint-Erblon (French pronunciation: [sɛ̃.t‿ɛʁblɔ̃]) is a commune in the Mayenne department in north-western France.

The commune is part of the Anjou historical region.

== Toponymy ==
The town's name could have come from Herbot, also named Herblot or Hermelan. The commune was named Erblou-sur-Araize under the French Revolution.

The citizens are called Saint-Erblonnais.

== Geography ==
The Semnon forms all of the commune's northern border.

== See also ==
- Communes of the Mayenne department
