= Canton of Cancale =

Coordinates: 48°38′10″N 1°51′19″W

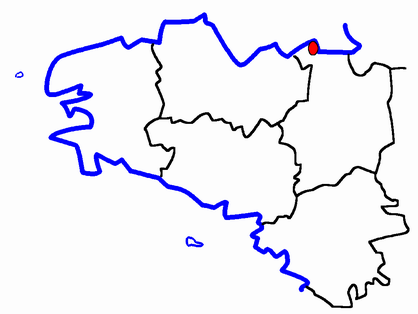

The canton of Cancale is a former canton of France, located in the arrondissement of Saint-Malo, in the Ille-et-Vilaine département, Brittany région. It had 16,254 inhabitants (2012). It was disbanded following the French canton reorganisation which came into effect in March 2015.

== Composition ==
The canton comprised the following communes:

- Cancale;
- La Fresnais;
- Hirel;
- Saint-Benoît-des-Ondes;
- Saint-Coulomb;
- Saint-Méloir-des-Ondes.

== Election results ==
Between 2011 and 2015, the canton of Cancale was represented in the general council of Ille-et-Vilaine department by DVG councillor Maurice Jannin, Mayor of Cancale.

=== 2004 ===
Party	candidate	Votes	% (first round)	Votes	% (second round)
Miscellaneous Left	Maurice Jannin	2,231	30.84%	3,985	52.66%
UMP	Mainguene	2,332	32.23%	3,582	47.34%
UMP diss.	Derrien	1,267	17.51%		
FN	Le Guillou	537	7.35%		
UDB	Logeais	400	5.53%		
Far-Left	Descottes	196	2.71%		
PCF	Bardou	147	2.03%		
Far-Left	Jensen	74	1.02%		
Miscellaneous Right	Jamain	56	0.77%		
