= Jean-Luc Bourgeaux =

French politician (born 1963)

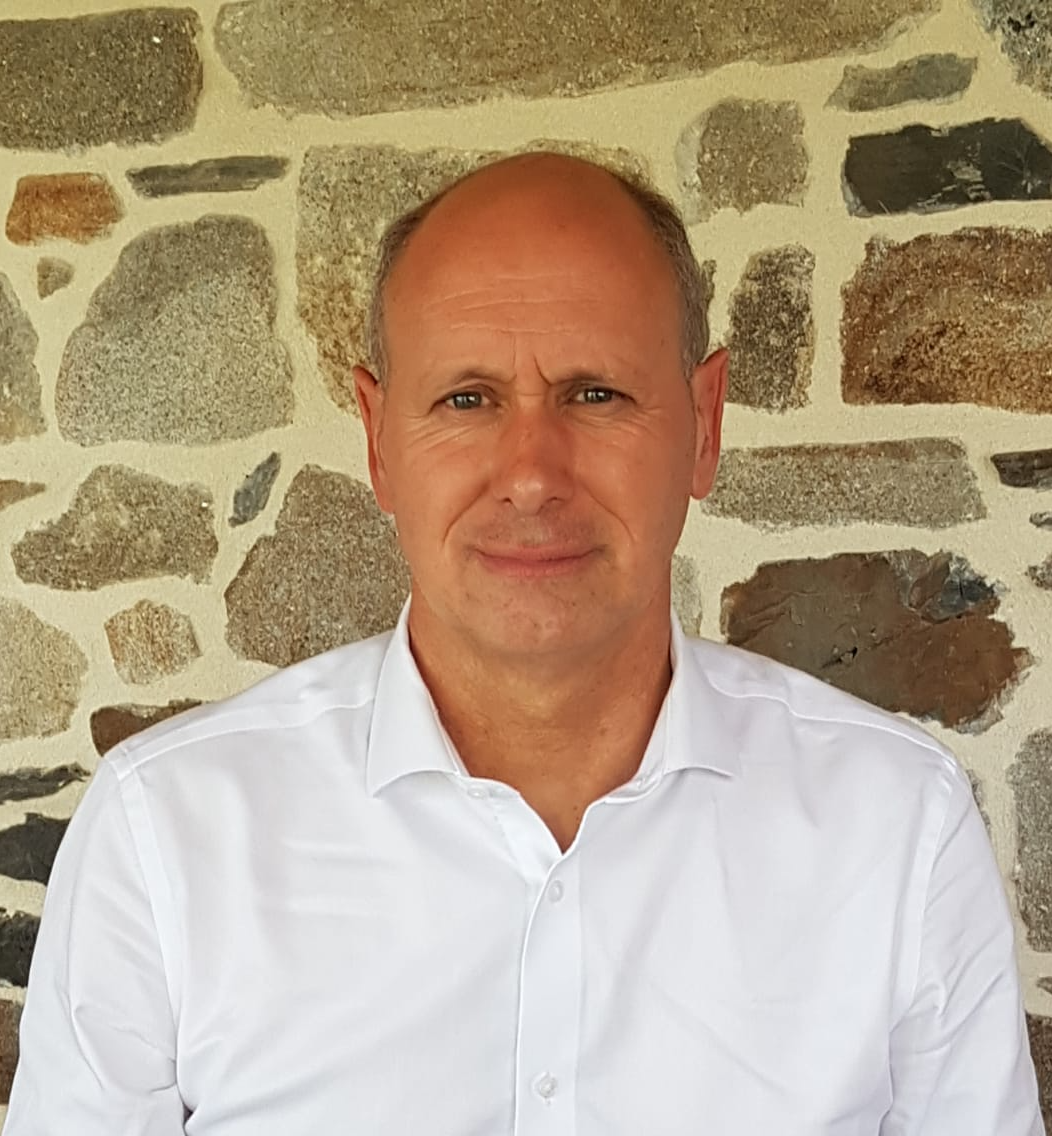

Member of the National Assembly for Ille-et-Vilaine's 7th constituency
- Incumbent
- Assumed office 1 August 2020
- Preceded by: Gilles Lurton

Personal details
- Born: 10 April 1963 (age 63) Saint-Malo, France
- Party: Republican
- Other political affiliations: UMP

Jean-Luc Bourgeaux (born 10 April 1963) is a French politician. He has been the Member of Parliament for Ille-et-Vilaine's 7th constituency since August 2020 and mayor of Cherrueix from 2001 to 2020.

== Biography ==
In 1989 he was elected municipal councillor and was elected mayor of Cherrueix in March 2001, succeeding Louis Dory. He was re-elected as a city councillor in 2008, he became the same year general councillor of the canton of Dol-de-Bretagne.

As a candidate in the 2014 French municipal elections, he was re-elected in the first round for a third term. In the 2015 French departmental elections he ran in the canton of Dol-de-Bretagne modified following the 2014 French cantonal distribution. In partnership with Agnès Toutant, he won the vote by collecting 72.50% of the votes cast. He became second vice-president of Communauté de communes du pays de Dol et de la baie du Mont-Saint-Michel in January 2017.

Bourgeaux was the substitute for MPs René Couanau (2007–2012) and Gilles Lurton (2012–2020), he succeeded Lurton in the National Assembly on 1 August 2020.

Due to the accumulation of mandates after his election as mayor of Saint-Malo and president of Saint-Malo Agglomeration Jean-Luc Bourgeaux was forced to leave his duties as mayor.

In 2020, he defined himself as having “centre-right sensitivity".

In the National Assembly, he joined the Les Républicains group as an Apparentment.

In the 2022 French legislative election he was re-elected MO in the second round with 52.23% of the votes against the Ensemble candidate Anne Le Gagne.

== Mandates ==
=== National Assembly ===
- MP since 1 August 2020 : Ille-et-Vilaine's 7th constituency

=== Local politics ===
- March 1989 – March 2001: municipal councillor of Cherrueix
- 23 March 2001 – August 2020: mayor of Cherrueix
- 11 March 2008 – 29 March 2015: general councillor of the canton of Dol-de-Bretagne
- 29 March 2015 – present: departmental councillor of the canton of Dol-de-Bretagne.

=== Intermunicipal mandates ===
- Since 19 January 2017: 2nd vice-president of the community of communes of the country of Dol and the bay of Mont-Saint-Michel
