= Canton of Saint-Malo-Sud =

Coordinates: 48°37′04″N 1°57′27″W

The canton of Saint-Malo-Sud is a former canton of France, located in the arrondissement of Saint-Malo, in the Ille-et-Vilaine département, Brittany région. It had 23,198 inhabitants (2012). It was disbanded following the French canton reorganisation which came into effect in March 2015.

== Composition ==
The canton comprised the following communes:

- La Gouesnière;
- Saint-Jouan-des-Guérets;
- Saint-Malo (fraction).

== Election results ==
At the 2011 cantonal elections, UMP councillor Gilles Lurton was elected to represent the canton of Saint-Malo-Sud in the general council of Ille-et-Vilaine department.

=== 2004 ===
Cantonal Elections 2004: Saint-Malo-Sud
| Party | Candidate | Votes | % | ±% |
|---|---|---|---|---|
| PS | Le Menn | 4,239 | 33.76 | |
| UMP | Lurton | 4,958 | 39.48 | |
| LV | Le Brelot | 1,121 | 8.93 | |
| FN | Beaujean | 921 | 7.33 | |
| LCR | Pierre Chapa | 519 | 4.13 | |
| PRG | Gaillard | 308 | 2.45 | |
| Far left | Floriat | 251 | 2.00 | |
| PCF | Le Sager | 241 | 1.92 | |
| Turnout | | 12 558 | 61.57 | |
| PS | Le Menn | 5,787 | 50.83 | |
| UMP | Lurton | 5,599 | 49.17 | |
| Turnout | | 11,386 | 55.75 | |
| PS hold | | Swing | | |

=== 1998 ===
Cantonal Elections 1998: Saint-Malo-Sud
| Party | Candidate | Votes | % | ±% |
|---|---|---|---|---|
| PS | Le Menn | 2,711 | 28.97 | |
| UDF | Lurton | 2,452 | 26.20 | |
| DVD | Goger | 2,159 | 23.07 | |
| FN | Mary | 727 | 7.77 | |
| UDB | Henri Gourmelen | 489 | 5.23 | |
| PCF | Le Sager | 391 | 4.18 | |
| Far left | Groisier | 211 | 2.25 | |
| Far right | Cazal | 190 | 2.03 | |
| Miscellaneous | Dehergne | 28 | 0.30 | |
| Turnout | | 9,358 | 54.74 | |
| PS | Le Menn | 4,261 | 50.22 | |
| UDF | Lurton | 4,223 | 49.78 | |
| Turnout | | 8,981 | 50.07 | |
| PS gain from DVD | | Swing | | |
