= Gilles Lurton =

French politician

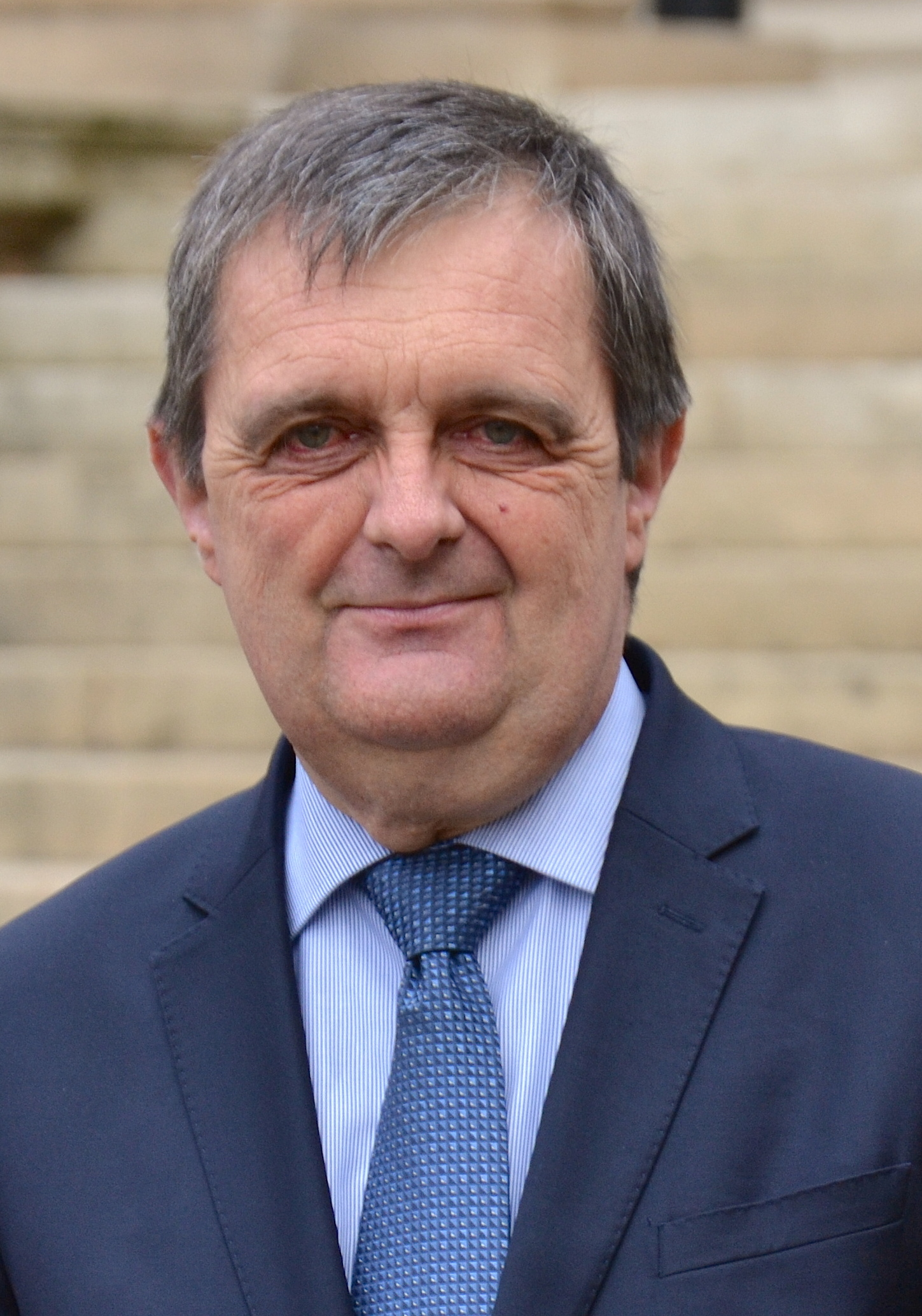
- Gilles Lurton in 2015

Mayor of Saint-Malo
- Incumbent
- Assumed office 3 July 2020
- Preceded by: Claude Renoult

Member of the National Assembly for Ille-et-Vilaine's 7th constituency
- In office 20 June 2012 – 31 July 2020
- Preceded by: René Couanau
- Succeeded by: Jean-Luc Bourgeaux

General Councillor of Ille-et-Vilaine
- In office 27 June 2011 – 15 July 2012
- Preceded by: Jacky Le Menn
- Succeeded by: Christine Lequertier

Personal details
- Born: 6 July 1963 (age 61); Saint-Servan, France
- Political party: The Republicans

Gilles Lurton (born 6 July 1963) is a French politician. He represented Ille-et-Vilaine's 7th constituency from 2012 to 2022, first as a member of the Union for a Popular Movement and then the Republicans.

== Biography ==
His first political office came when he was elected to the municipal council of Saint-Malo in 1995. Following the 2008 elections, he was appointed deputy mayor of Saint-Malo (in charge of housing and neighborhoods).

He became general councilor of Ille-et-Vilaine in 2011 taking the canton of Saint-Malo-Sud, succeeding Jacky Le Menn who did not stand for re-election.

In 2012, he stood for Ille-et-Vilaine's 7th constituency. He came second in the first round of the election with 21% of the vote, then in the second round, defeated the socialist Isabelle Thomas with 51% of the vote. He sits on the Social Affairs Committee of the National Assembly. Due to the rule of non-cumulation of mandates, he gave up his mandate as general councilor of Ille-et-Vilaine. His substitute Christine Lequertier succeeded him in July 2012.

The list led by René Couanau placing only 3rd in the second round of the municipal elections of March 2014, he then lost his post as deputy mayor and sat as a simple municipal councilor.

He supported Bruno Le Maire in the 2016 presidential primary for the Republicans. In September 2016, he was appointed, with several others, member of the political committee of the campaign.

In 2020, He became the Mayor of Saint-Malo and the President of Saint-Malo Agglomerations. He was elected with 70.7% of the voices given
