= Le Tronchet, Ille-et-Vilaine =

Le Tronchet Ar Granneg (Breton)
- Commune
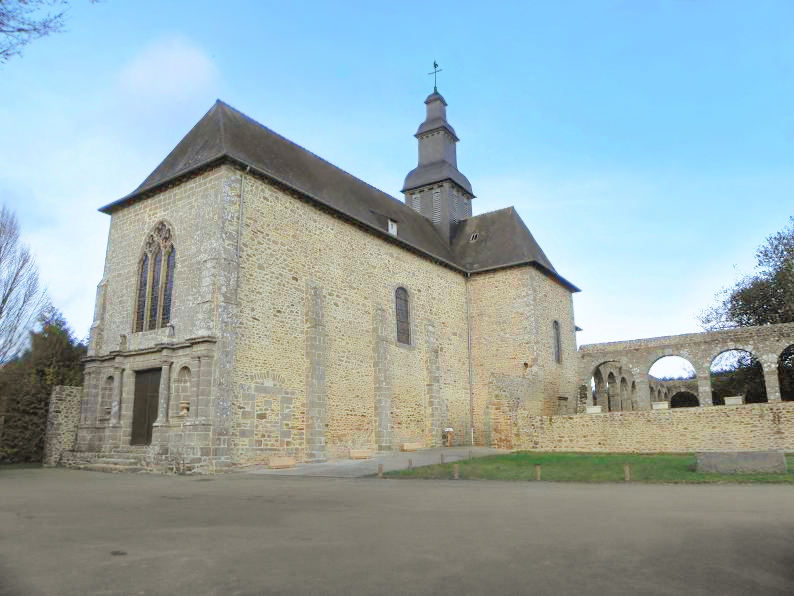
- The church in Le Tronchet

- Coat of arms
- Location of Le Tronchet
- Location within France Location within Brittany
- Coordinates: 48°29′13″N 1°50′07″W
- Country: France
- Region: Brittany
- Department: Ille-et-Vilaine
- Arrondissement: Saint-Malo
- Canton: Dol-de-Bretagne
- Intercommunality: CA Pays de Saint-Malo

Government
  - Mayor (2020–2026): Pascal Briand
- Area^{1}: 11.35 km^{2} (4.38 sq mi)
- Highest elevation: 79 m (259 ft)
- Lowest elevation: 13 m (43 ft)
- Population (2023): 1,202
  - Density: 105.9/km^{2} (274.3/sq mi)
- Time zone: UTC+01:00 (CET)
  - Summer (DST): UTC+02:00 (CEST)
- INSEE/Postal code: 35362 /35540
- ^{1} French Land Register data, which excludes lakes, ponds, glaciers > 1 km^{2} (0.386 sq mi or 247 acres) and river estuaries.

Le Tronchet (French pronunciation: [lə tʁɔ̃ʃɛ]; Breton: Ar Granneg) is a commune in the Ille-et-Vilaine department in Brittany in northwestern France. It was created in 1953 from part of the commune Plerguer.

== Population ==
Inhabitants of Le Tronchet are called Tronchetois in French.

Historical population
Year	Pop.	±% p.a.
1968	840	—
1975	904	+1.05%
1982	825	−1.30%
1990	818	−0.11%
1999	845	+0.36%
2007	978	+1.84%
2012	1,108	+2.53%
2017	1,161	+0.94%
2023	1,202	+0.58%
Source: INSEE

== See also ==
- Communes of the Ille-et-Vilaine department
