= Roz-sur-Couesnon =

Roz-sur-Couesnon Roz-an-Arvor (Breton)
- Commune
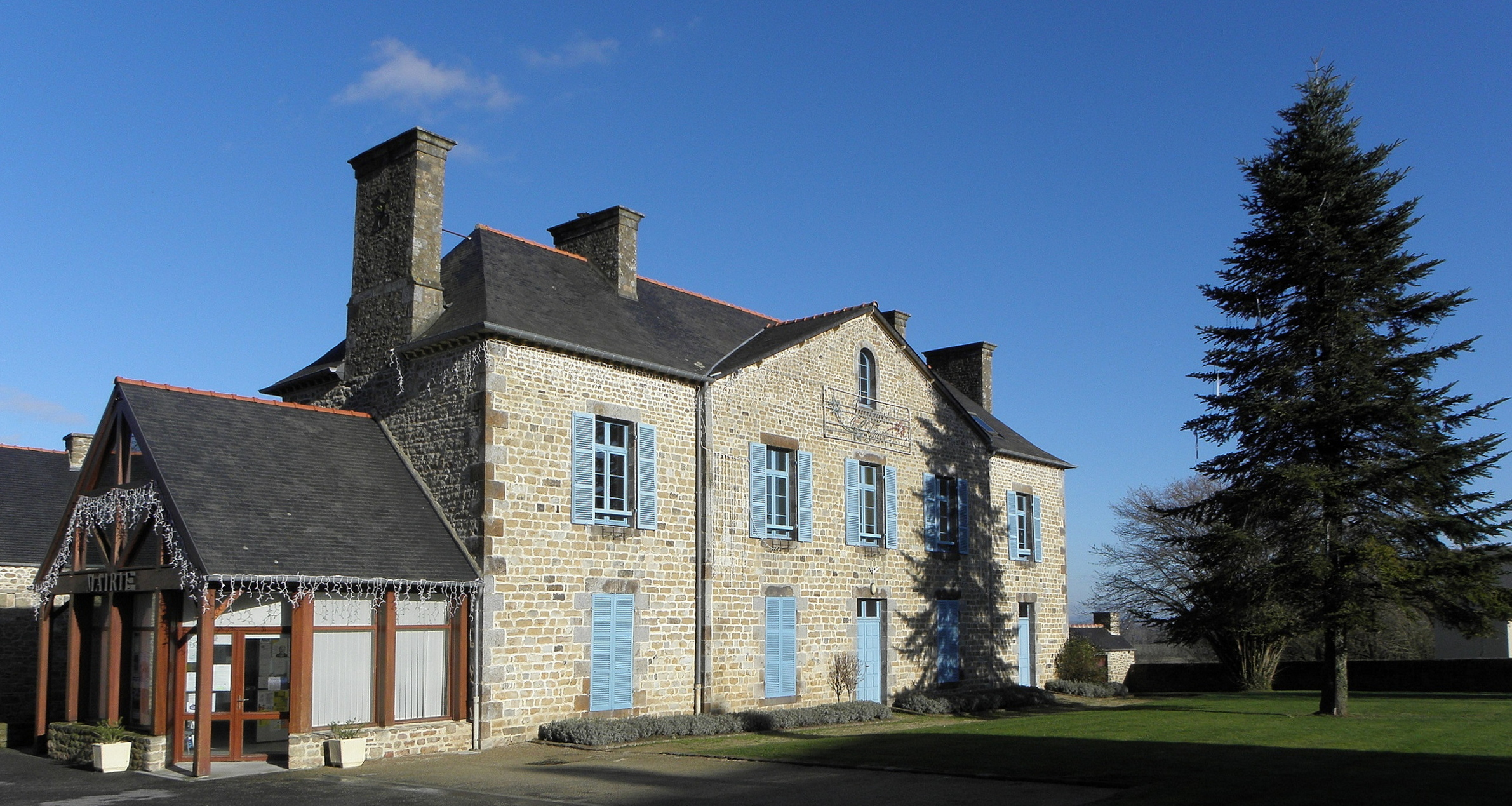
- The town hall in Roz-sur-Couesnon
- Location of Roz-sur-Couesnon
- Location within France Location within Brittany
- Coordinates: 48°35′23″N 1°35′29″W
- Country: France
- Region: Brittany
- Department: Ille-et-Vilaine
- Arrondissement: Saint-Malo
- Canton: Dol-de-Bretagne

Government
  - Mayor (2020–2026): Christophe Fambon
- Area^{1}: 25.86 km^{2} (9.98 sq mi)
- Highest elevation: 97 m (318 ft)
- Lowest elevation: 5 m (16 ft)
- Population (2023): 1,059
  - Density: 40.95/km^{2} (106.1/sq mi)
- Time zone: UTC+01:00 (CET)
  - Summer (DST): UTC+02:00 (CEST)
- INSEE/Postal code: 35247 /35610
- ^{1} French Land Register data, which excludes lakes, ponds, glaciers > 1 km^{2} (0.386 sq mi or 247 acres) and river estuaries.

Roz-sur-Couesnon (French pronunciation: [ʁo syʁ kwenɔ̃], literally Roz on Couesnon; Breton: Roz-an-Arvor) is a commune in the Ille-et-Vilaine department in Brittany in northwestern France.

== Population ==
Inhabitants of Roz-sur-Couesnon are called Rozéens in French.

Historical population
Year	Pop.	±% p.a.
1968	1,120	—
1975	1,006	−1.52%
1982	953	−0.77%
1990	921	−0.43%
1999	952	+0.37%
2007	1,001	+0.63%
2012	1,020	+0.38%
2017	1,003	−0.34%
2023	1,059	+0.91%
Source: INSEE

== See also ==
- Communes of the Ille-et-Vilaine department
