= Saint-Suliac =

Saint-Suliac Saent-Suliau (Gallo) Sant-Suliav (Breton)
- Commune
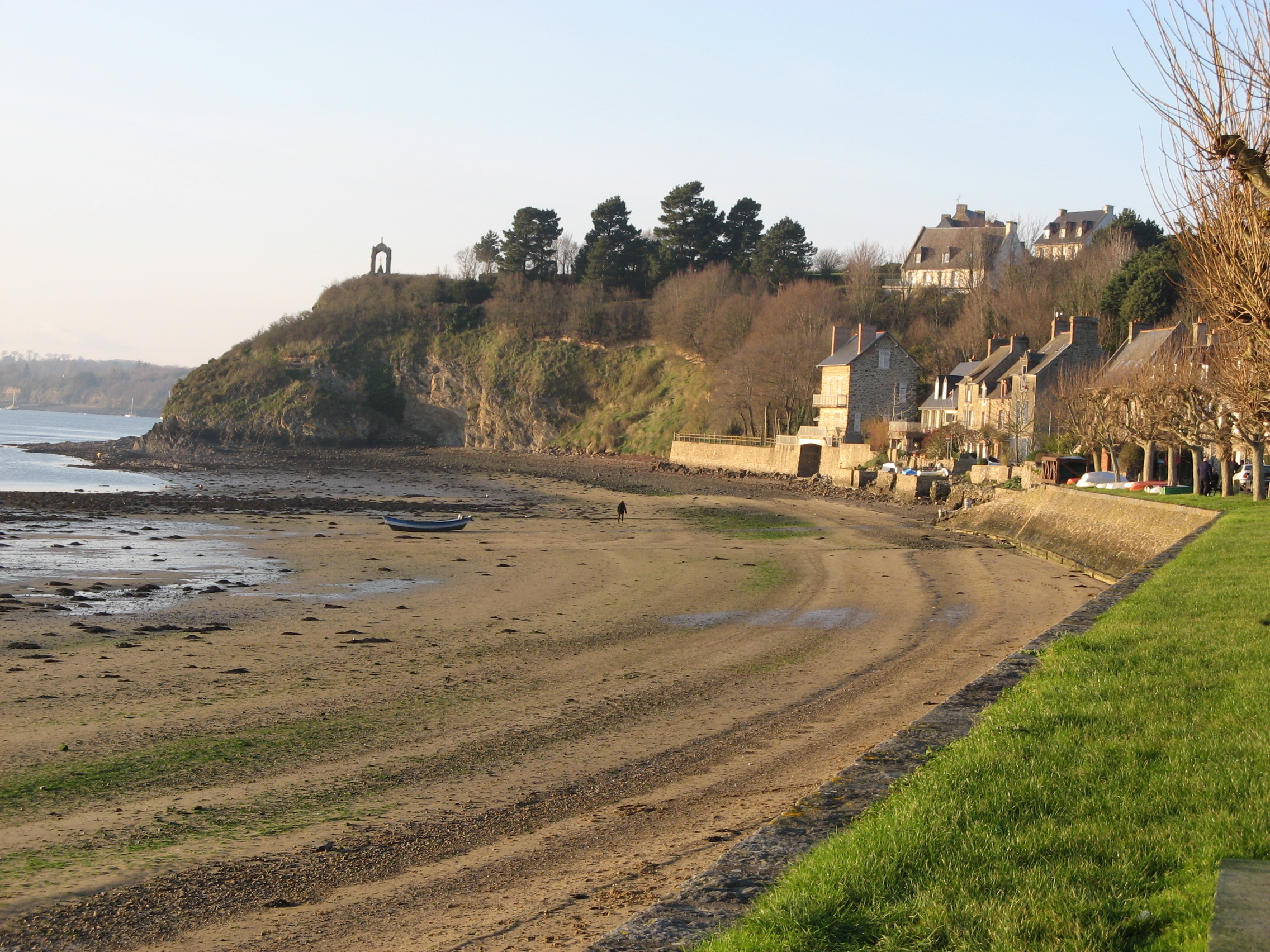
- The shore of Saint-Suliac

- Coat of arms
- Location of Saint-Suliac
- Location within France Location within Brittany
- Coordinates: 48°34′15″N 1°58′17″W
- Country: France
- Region: Brittany
- Department: Ille-et-Vilaine
- Arrondissement: Saint-Malo
- Canton: Dol-de-Bretagne
- Intercommunality: CA Pays de Saint-Malo

Government
  - Mayor (2020–2026): Pascal Bianco
- Area^{1}: 5.46 km^{2} (2.11 sq mi)
- Highest elevation: 73 m (240 ft)
- Lowest elevation: 0 m (0 ft)
- Population (2023): 1,018
  - Density: 186/km^{2} (483/sq mi)
- Time zone: UTC+01:00 (CET)
  - Summer (DST): UTC+02:00 (CEST)
- INSEE/Postal code: 35314 /35430
- ^{1} French Land Register data, which excludes lakes, ponds, glaciers > 1 km^{2} (0.386 sq mi or 247 acres) and river estuaries.

Saint-Suliac (French pronunciation: [sɛ̃ syljak]; Breton: Sant-Suliav; Gallo: Saent-Suliau) is a commune in the Ille-et-Vilaine department in Brittany in northwestern France. It is one of Les Plus Beaux Villages de France.

== Population ==
Inhabitants of Saint-Suliac are called Suliaçais in French.

Historical population
Year	Pop.	±% p.a.
1968	610	—
1975	614	+0.09%
1982	768	+3.25%
1990	802	+0.54%
1999	853	+0.69%
2007	930	+1.09%
2012	975	+0.95%
2017	907	−1.44%
2023	1,018	+1.94%
Source: INSEE

== See also ==
- Communes of the Ille-et-Vilaine department
