= Châteauneuf-d'Ille-et-Vilaine =

Châteauneuf-d'Ille-et-Vilaine Kastell-Noez (Breton)
- Commune
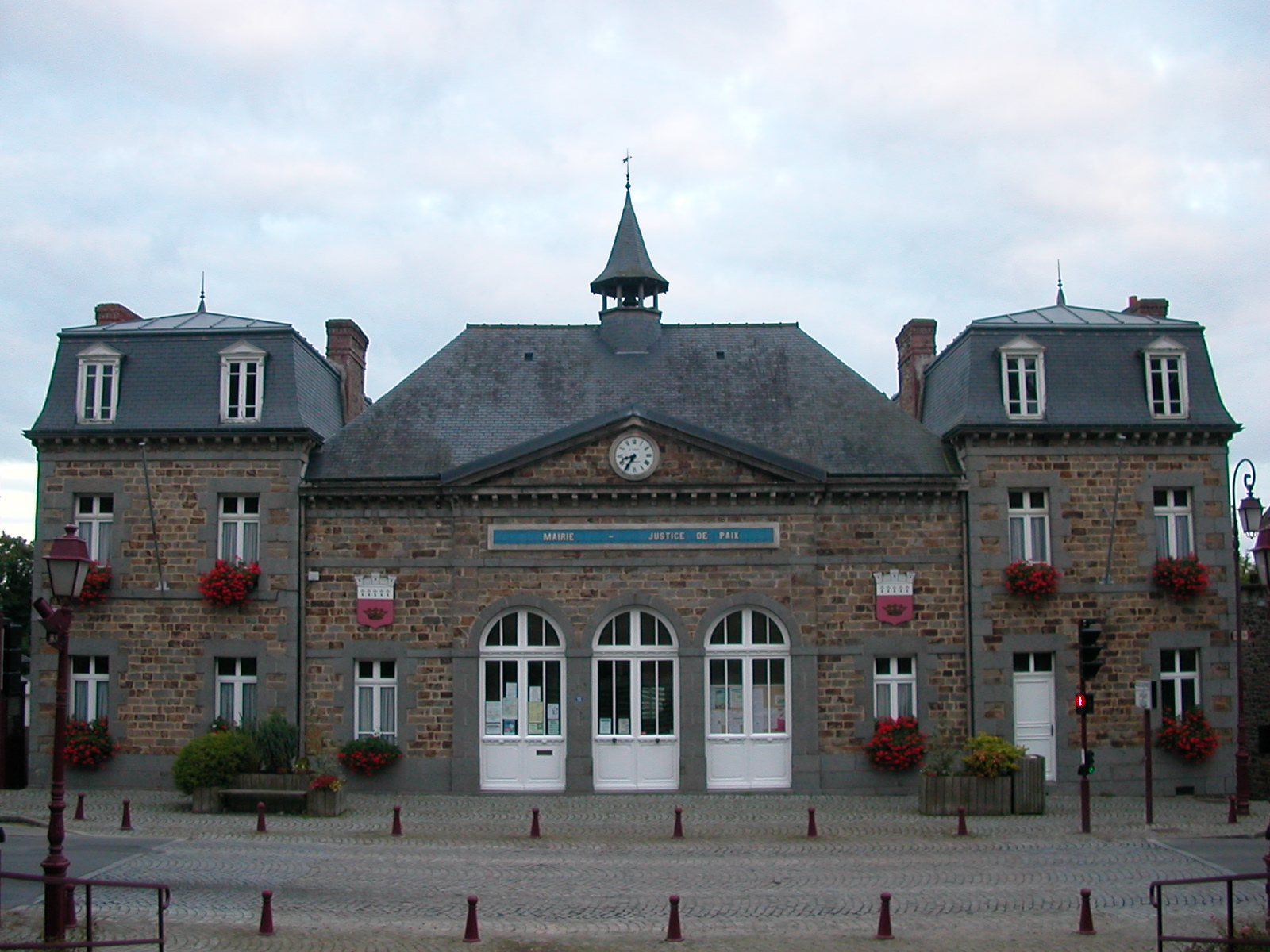
- Town hall

- Coat of arms
- Location of Châteauneuf-d'Ille-et-Vilaine
- Location within France Location within Brittany
- Coordinates: 48°33′43″N 1°55′43″W
- Country: France
- Region: Brittany
- Department: Ille-et-Vilaine
- Arrondissement: Saint-Malo
- Canton: Dol-de-Bretagne
- Intercommunality: CA Pays de Saint-Malo

Government
  - Mayor (2020–2026): Joël Masseron
- Area^{1}: 1.38 km^{2} (0.53 sq mi)
- Highest elevation: 43 m (141 ft)
- Lowest elevation: 2 m (6.6 ft)
- Population (2023): 1,664
  - Density: 1,210/km^{2} (3,120/sq mi)
- Time zone: UTC+01:00 (CET)
  - Summer (DST): UTC+02:00 (CEST)
- INSEE/Postal code: 35070 /35430
- ^{1} French Land Register data, which excludes lakes, ponds, glaciers > 1 km^{2} (0.386 sq mi or 247 acres) and river estuaries.

Châteauneuf-d'Ille-et-Vilaine (French: [ʃɑtonœf dil e vilɛn]; Breton: Kastell-Noez) is a commune in the Ille-et-Vilaine department of Brittany in north-western France.

== Population ==
Inhabitants of Châteauneuf-d'Ille-et-Vilaine are called Castelnoviens in French.

Historical population
| Year | Pop. | ±% p.a. |
|---|---|---|
| 1968 | 662 | — |
| 1975 | 685 | +0.49% |
| 1982 | 806 | +2.35% |
| 1990 | 813 | +0.11% |
| 1999 | 912 | +1.28% |
| 2007 | 1,064 | +1.95% |
| 2012 | 1,478 | +6.79% |
| 2017 | 1,722 | +3.10% |
| 2023 | 1,664 | −0.57% |
Source: INSEE

== See also ==
- Communes of the Ille-et-Vilaine department
