= Epiniac =

Epiniac Espeinyac (Gallo) Sperneg (Breton)
- Commune
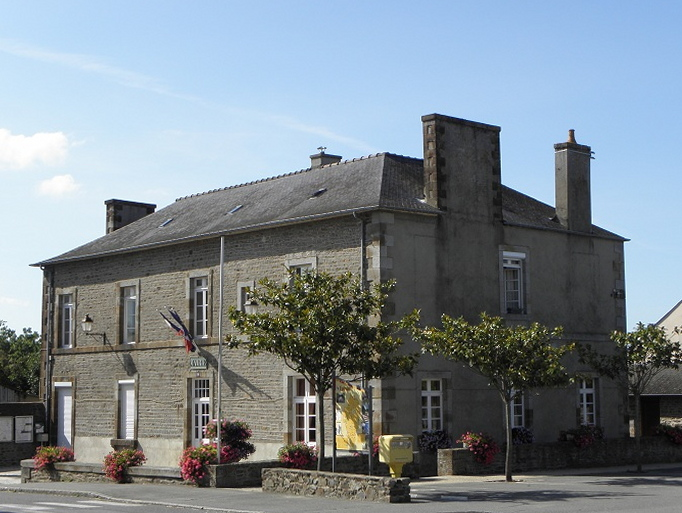
- Town hall

- Coat of arms
- Location of Epiniac
- Location within France Location within Brittany
- Coordinates: 48°30′39″N 1°41′41″W
- Country: France
- Region: Brittany
- Department: Ille-et-Vilaine
- Arrondissement: Saint-Malo
- Canton: Dol-de-Bretagne

Government
  - Mayor (2020–2026): Sylvie Ramé-Prunaux
- Area^{1}: 23.77 km^{2} (9.18 sq mi)
- Highest elevation: 107 m (351 ft)
- Lowest elevation: 11 m (36 ft)
- Population (2023): 1,438
  - Density: 60.50/km^{2} (156.7/sq mi)
- Time zone: UTC+01:00 (CET)
  - Summer (DST): UTC+02:00 (CEST)
- INSEE/Postal code: 35104 /35120
- ^{1} French Land Register data, which excludes lakes, ponds, glaciers > 1 km^{2} (0.386 sq mi or 247 acres) and river estuaries.

Epiniac (French pronunciation: [epinjak]; Breton: Sperneg; Gallo: Espeinyac) is a commune in the Ille-et-Vilaine department in Brittany in northwestern France.

== Population ==
Inhabitants of Epiniac are called Epiniacais in French.

Historical population
Year	Pop.	±% p.a.
1968	1,126	—
1975	1,064	−0.81%
1982	1,104	+0.53%
1990	1,105	+0.01%
1999	1,078	−0.27%
2007	1,223	+1.59%
2012	1,402	+2.77%
2017	1,426	+0.34%
2023	1,438	+0.14%
Source: INSEE

== Gallery ==
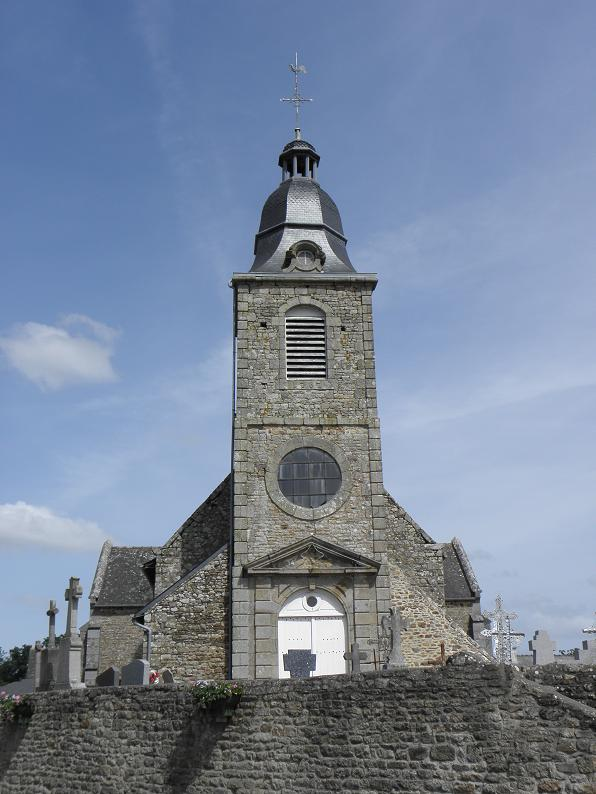
Saint Léonard church

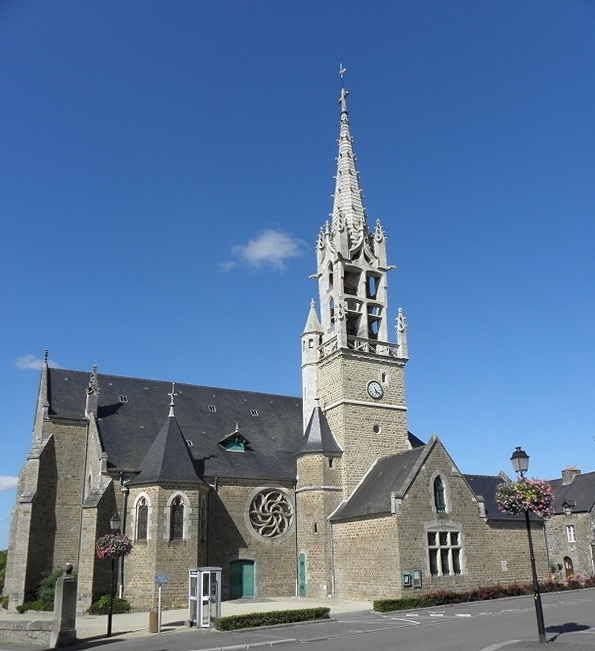
Saint Pierre church

== See also ==
- Communes of the Ille-et-Vilaine department
