= La Ville-ès-Nonais =

La Ville-ès-Nonais La Vill-èz-Nonaèn (Gallo) Kerlean (Breton)
- Commune
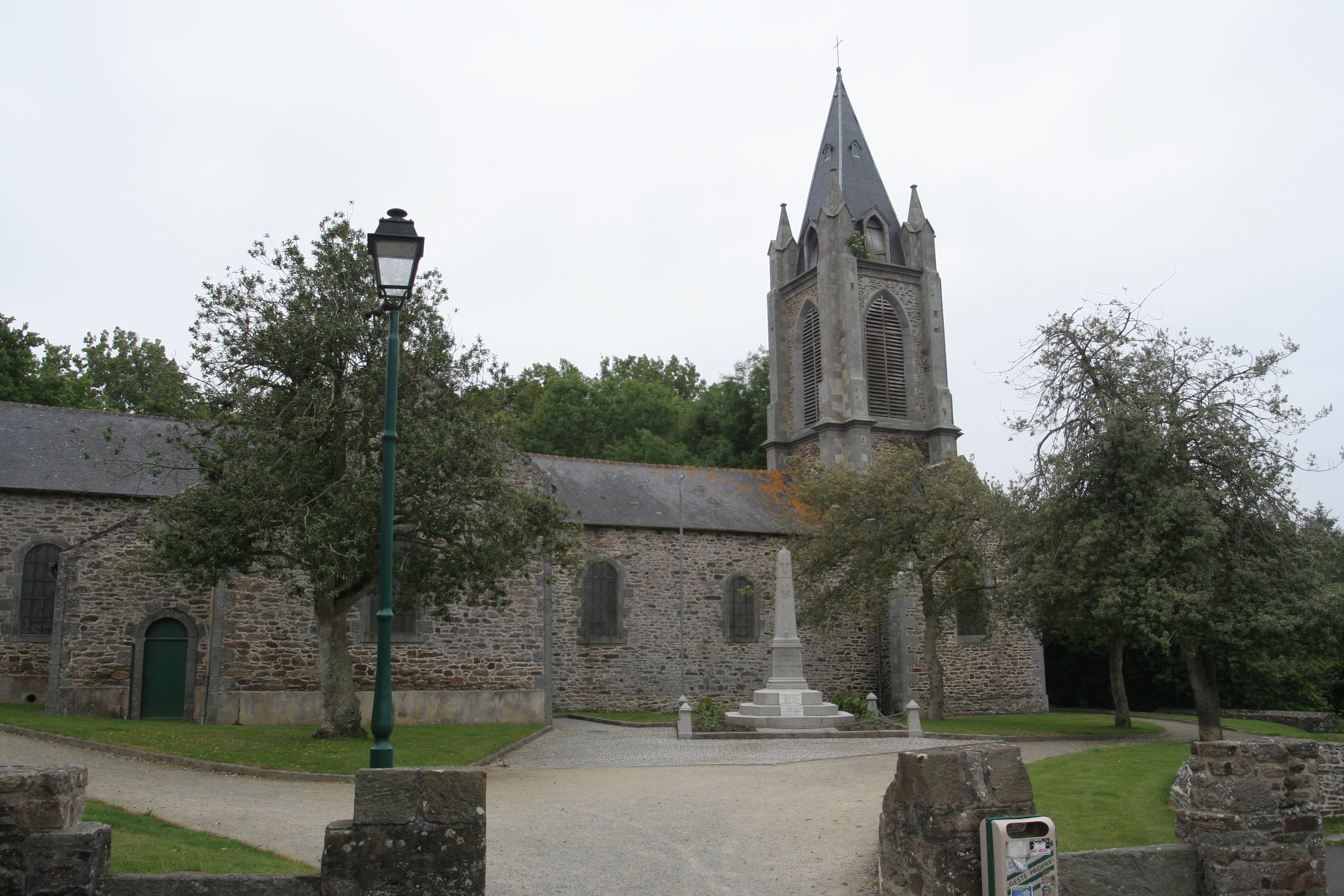
- The church in La Ville-ès-Nonais
- Location of La Ville-ès-Nonais
- Location within France Location within Brittany
- Coordinates: 48°32′55″N 1°57′07″W
- Country: France
- Region: Brittany
- Department: Ille-et-Vilaine
- Arrondissement: Saint-Malo
- Canton: Dol-de-Bretagne
- Intercommunality: CA Pays de Saint-Malo

Government
  - Mayor (2020–2026): Jean-Malo Cornée
- Area^{1}: 4.34 km^{2} (1.68 sq mi)
- Highest elevation: 53 m (174 ft)
- Lowest elevation: 0 m (0 ft)
- Population (2023): 1,233
  - Density: 284/km^{2} (736/sq mi)
- Time zone: UTC+01:00 (CET)
  - Summer (DST): UTC+02:00 (CEST)
- INSEE/Postal code: 35358 /35430
- ^{1} French Land Register data, which excludes lakes, ponds, glaciers > 1 km^{2} (0.386 sq mi or 247 acres) and river estuaries.

La Ville-ès-Nonais (French pronunciation: [la vil ɛs nɔnɛ]; Gallo: La Vill-èz-Nonaèn, Breton: Kerlean) is a commune in the Ille-et-Vilaine department of Brittany in northwestern France.

== Population ==
Inhabitants of La Ville-ès-Nonais are called in French nonaisiens.

Historical population
Year	Pop.	±% p.a.
1968	537	—
1975	504	−0.90%
1982	581	+2.05%
1990	634	+1.10%
1999	681	+0.80%
2007	987	+4.75%
2012	1,096	+2.12%
2017	1,203	+1.88%
2023	1,233	+0.41%
Source: INSEE

== See also ==
- Communes of the Ille-et-Vilaine department
