= Saint-Père-Marc-en-Poulet =

Saint-Père-Marc-en-Poulet Saent-Pere (Gallo) Sant-Pêr-Poualed (Breton)
- Commune
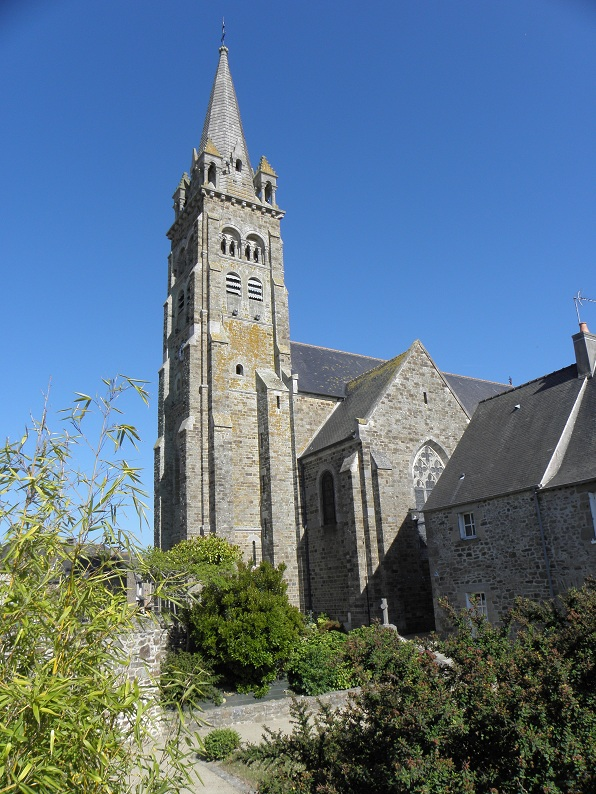
- The church of Saint-Pierre

- Coat of arms
- Location of Saint-Père-Marc-en-Poulet
- Location within France Location within Brittany
- Coordinates: 48°35′19″N 1°55′22″W
- Country: France
- Region: Brittany
- Department: Ille-et-Vilaine
- Arrondissement: Saint-Malo
- Canton: Dol-de-Bretagne
- Intercommunality: CA Pays de Saint-Malo

Government
  - Mayor (2020–2026): Jean-Francis Richeux
- Area^{1}: 19.74 km^{2} (7.62 sq mi)
- Highest elevation: 56 m (184 ft)
- Lowest elevation: 1 m (3.3 ft)
- Population (2023): 2,440
  - Density: 124/km^{2} (320/sq mi)
- Time zone: UTC+01:00 (CET)
  - Summer (DST): UTC+02:00 (CEST)
- INSEE/Postal code: 35306 /35430
- ^{1} French Land Register data, which excludes lakes, ponds, glaciers > 1 km^{2} (0.386 sq mi or 247 acres) and river estuaries.

Saint-Père-Marc-en-Poulet (French pronunciation: [sɛ̃ pɛʁ maʁk ɑ̃ pulɛ]; before 2018: Saint-Père; Breton: Sant-Pêr-Poualed) is a commune in the Ille-et-Vilaine department in Brittany in northwestern France.

== Population ==
Inhabitants of Saint-Père are called péréens in French.

Historical population
Year	Pop.	±% p.a.
1968	1,055	—
1975	1,080	+0.34%
1982	1,247	+2.08%
1990	1,516	+2.47%
1999	1,750	+1.61%
2007	2,178	+2.77%
2012	2,256	+0.71%
2017	2,298	+0.37%
2023	2,440	+1.00%
Source: INSEE

== See also ==
- Communes of the Ille-et-Vilaine department
