= Saint-Guinoux =

Saint-Guinoux Sant-Gwênoù (Breton)
- Commune
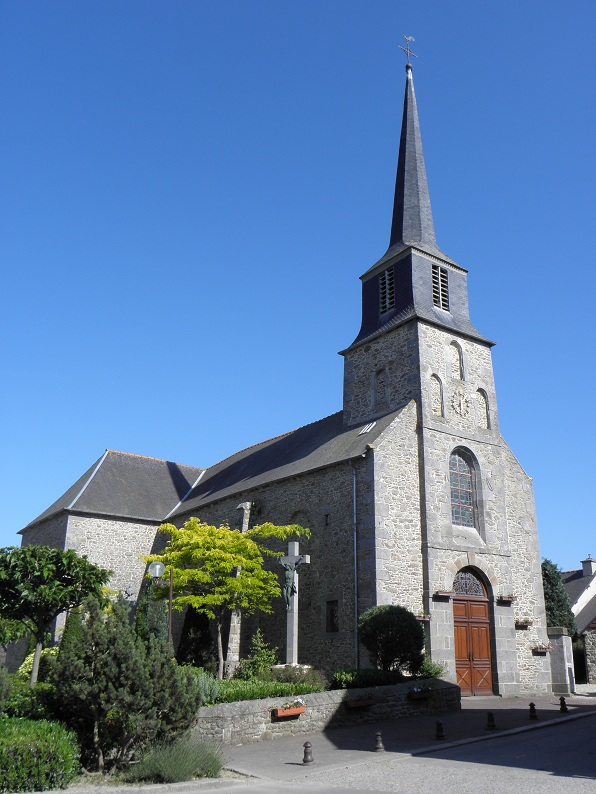
- The church of Saint-Guinoux

- Coat of arms
- Location of Saint-Guinoux
- Location within France Location within Brittany
- Coordinates: 48°34′36″N 1°52′57″W
- Country: France
- Region: Brittany
- Department: Ille-et-Vilaine
- Arrondissement: Saint-Malo
- Canton: Dol-de-Bretagne
- Intercommunality: CA Pays de Saint-Malo

Government
  - Mayor (2020–2026): Pascal Simon
- Area^{1}: 6.37 km^{2} (2.46 sq mi)
- Highest elevation: 48 m (157 ft)
- Lowest elevation: 2 m (6.6 ft)
- Population (2023): 1,285
  - Density: 202/km^{2} (522/sq mi)
- Time zone: UTC+01:00 (CET)
  - Summer (DST): UTC+02:00 (CEST)
- INSEE/Postal code: 35279 /35430
- ^{1} French Land Register data, which excludes lakes, ponds, glaciers > 1 km^{2} (0.386 sq mi or 247 acres) and river estuaries.

Saint-Guinoux (French pronunciation: [sɛ̃ ɡinu]; Breton: Sant-Gwênoù) is a commune in the Ille-et-Vilaine department in Brittany in northwestern France.

== Population ==
Inhabitants of Saint-Guinoux are called guinoléens in French.

Historical population
Year	Pop.	±% p.a.
1968	519	—
1975	636	+2.95%
1982	697	+1.32%
1990	736	+0.68%
1999	733	−0.05%
2007	919	+2.87%
2012	1,003	+1.76%
2017	1,210	+3.82%
2023	1,285	+1.01%
Source: INSEE

== See also ==
- Communes of the Ille-et-Vilaine department
