= Saint-Coulomb =

Saint-Coulomb Sant-Kouloum (Breton)
- Commune
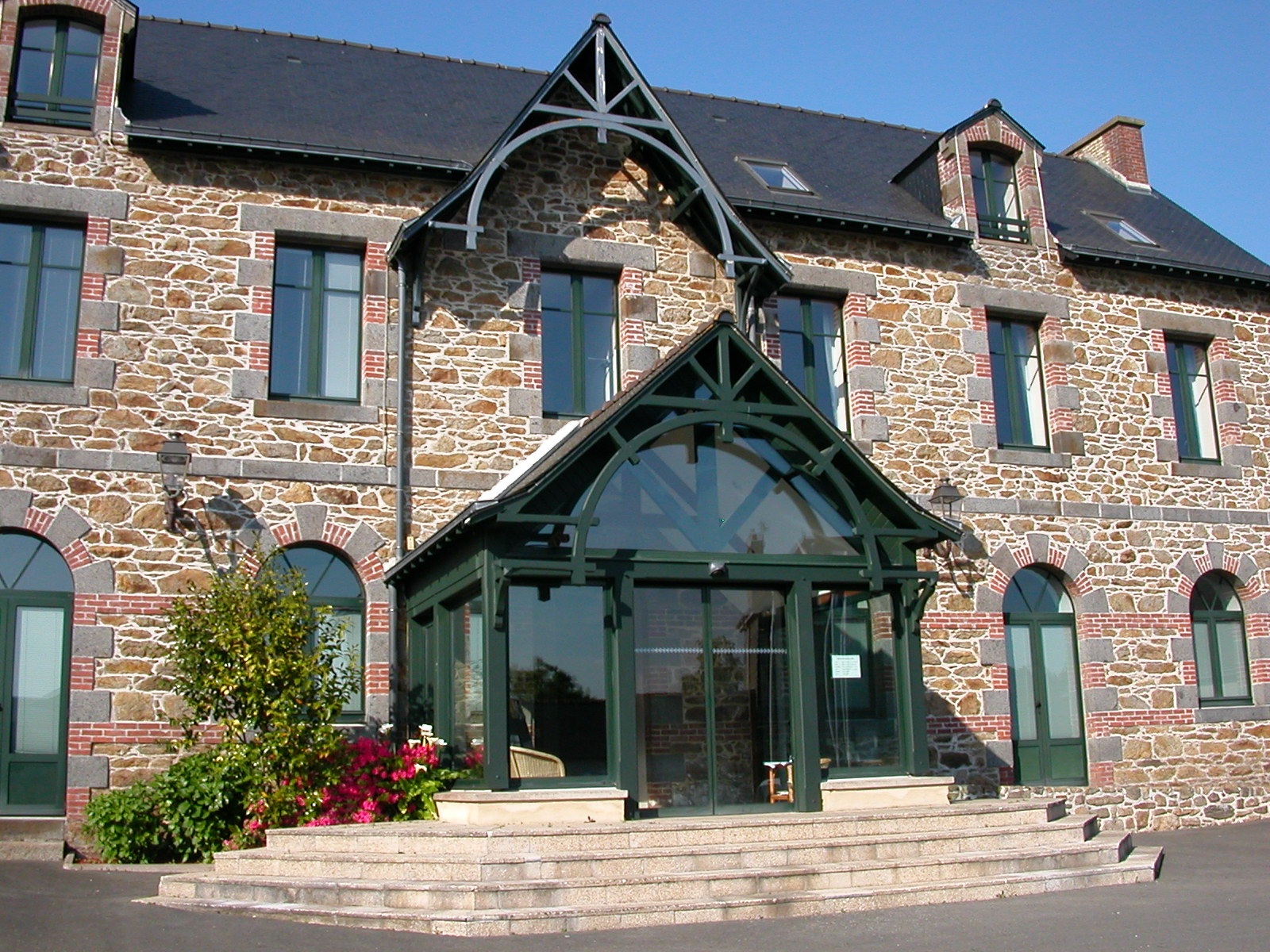
- The town hall of Saint-Coulomb

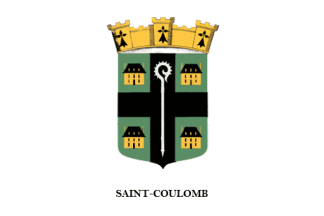
- Flag Coat of arms
- Location of Saint-Coulomb
- Location within France Location within Brittany
- Coordinates: 48°40′33″N 1°54′37″W
- Country: France
- Region: Brittany
- Department: Ille-et-Vilaine
- Arrondissement: Saint-Malo
- Canton: Saint-Malo-1
- Intercommunality: CA Pays de Saint-Malo

Government
  - Mayor (2020–2026): Jean-Michel Fredou
- Area^{1}: 18.04 km^{2} (6.97 sq mi)
- Elevation: 40 m (130 ft)
- Highest elevation: 52 m (171 ft)
- Lowest elevation: 0 m (0 ft)
- Population (2023): 2,969
  - Density: 164.6/km^{2} (426.3/sq mi)
- Time zone: UTC+01:00 (CET)
  - Summer (DST): UTC+02:00 (CEST)
- INSEE/Postal code: 35263 /35350
- ^{1} French Land Register data, which excludes lakes, ponds, glaciers > 1 km^{2} (0.386 sq mi or 247 acres) and river estuaries.

Saint-Coulomb (French pronunciation: [sɛ̃ kulɔ̃]; Breton: Sant-Kouloum) is a commune in the Ille-et-Vilaine department in Brittany in northwestern France.

== Population ==
Inhabitants are called colombanais in French.

Historical population
Year	Pop.	±% p.a.
1968	1,542	—
1975	1,611	+0.63%
1982	1,746	+1.16%
1990	1,938	+1.31%
1999	2,168	+1.25%
2007	2,348	+1.00%
2012	2,554	+1.70%
2017	2,707	+1.17%
2023	2,969	+1.55%
Source: INSEE

== History ==
Its name comes from Saint Colomban, who came in the years 580 - 590. Accompanied by several monks, he crossed the English Channel and landed either on the Du Guesclin beach or a few hundreds meters further to the west.

== Beaches ==
This commune has several beaches, very frequented by tourists in summer.

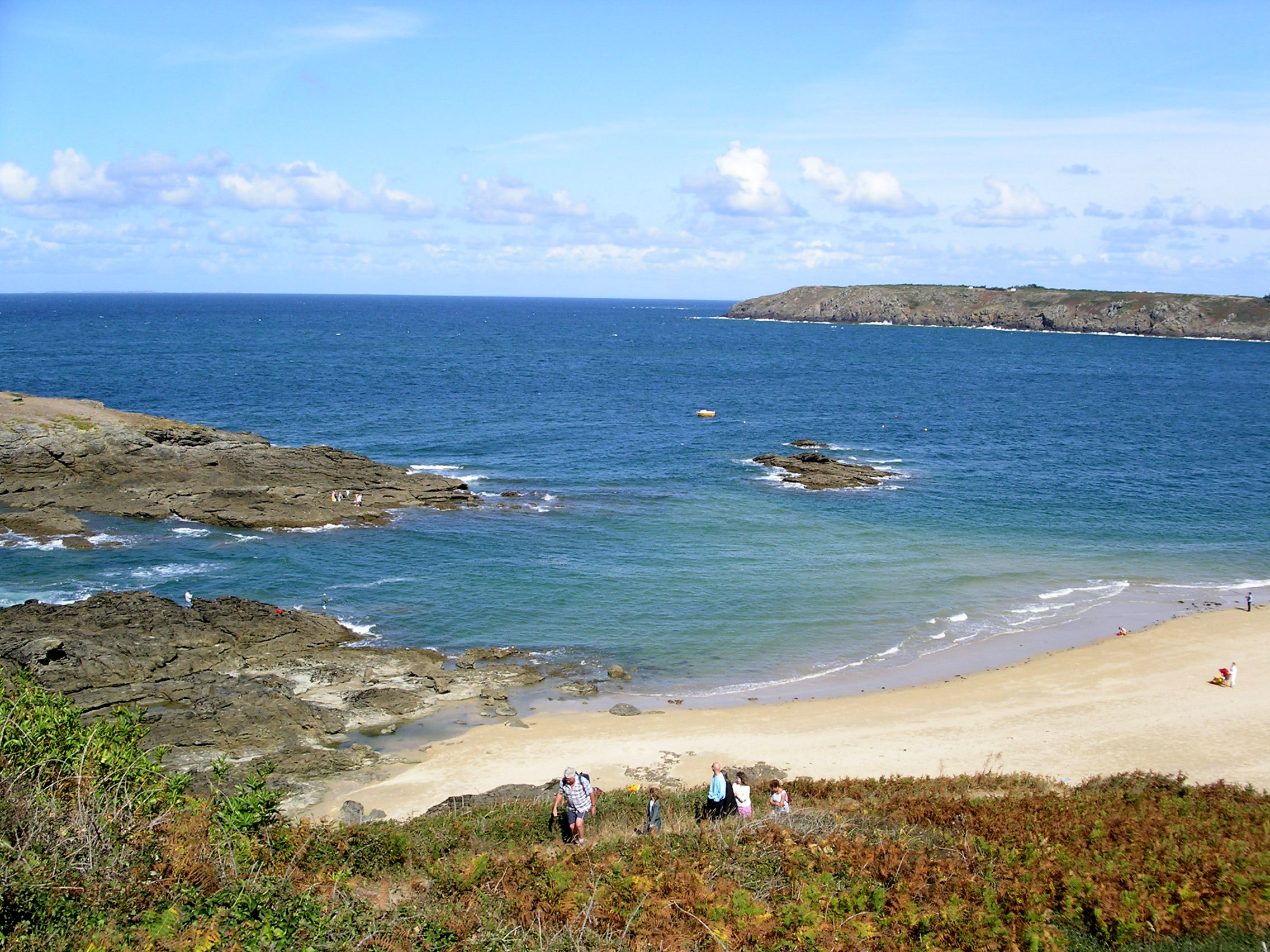
Customs path

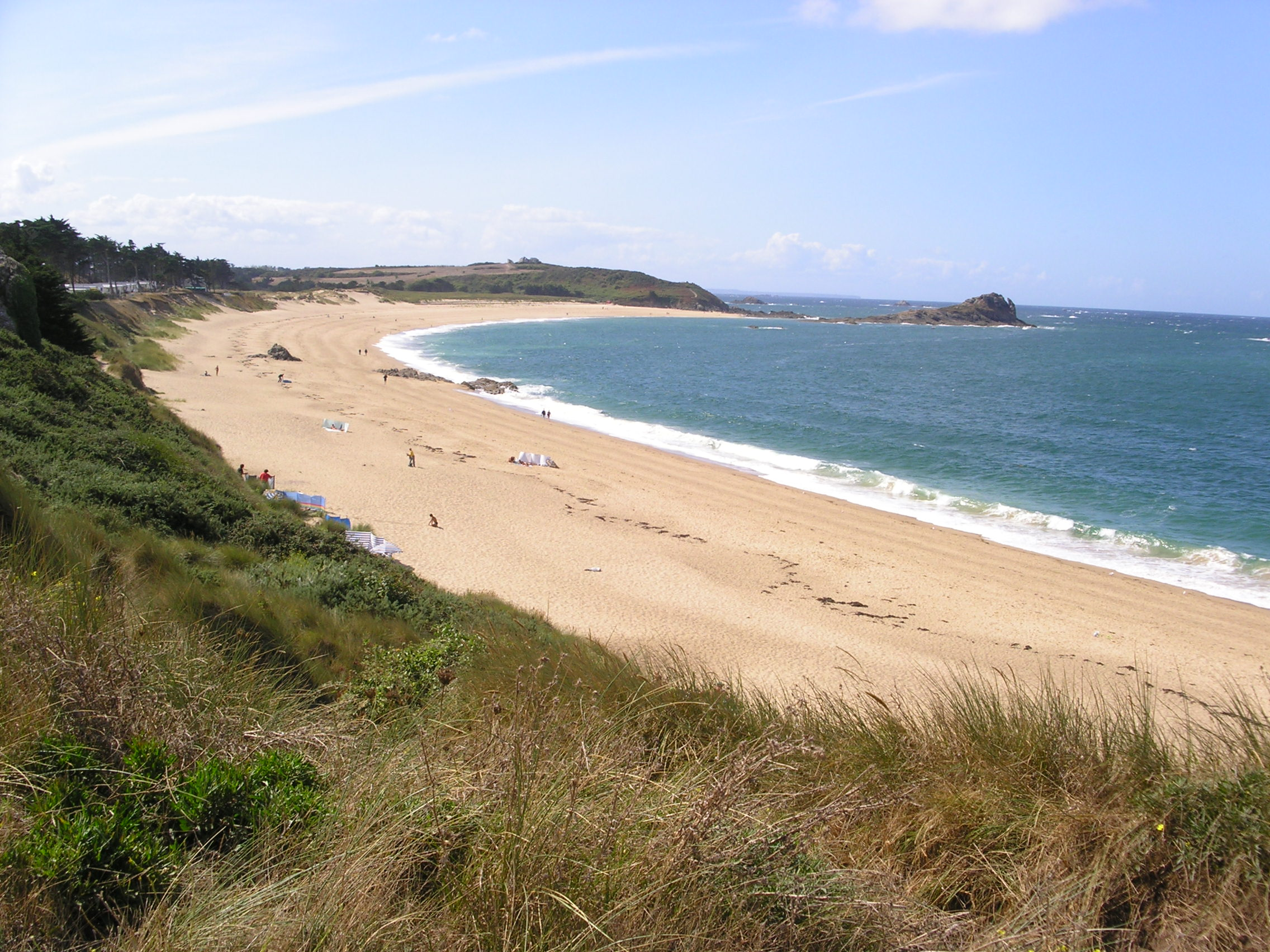
Chevrets beach

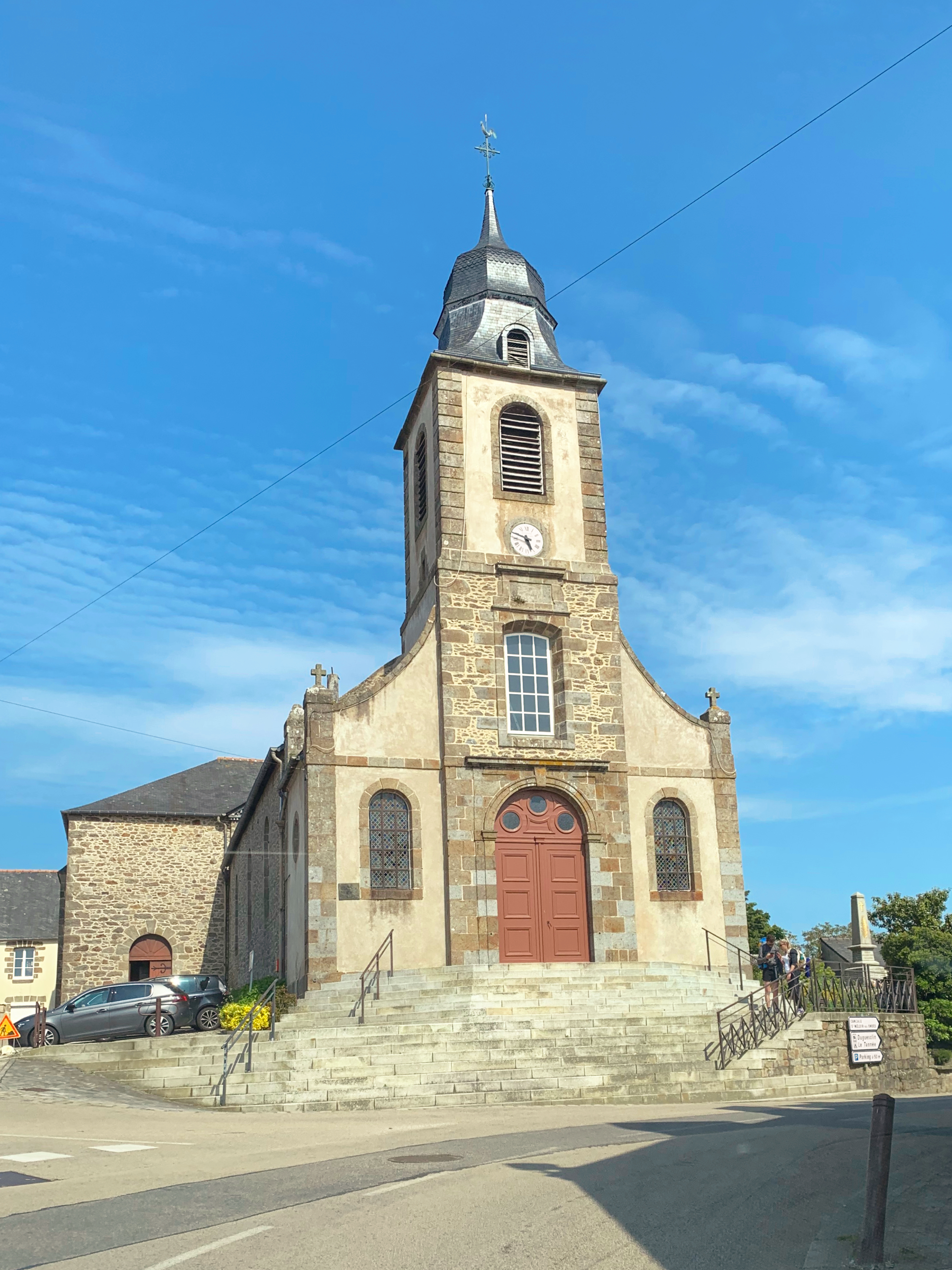
Saint-Coulomb church

== Malouinières ==
The Malouinières are historic buildings built between 1650 and 1730 within 12 km (7.5 mi) of Saint Malo, by its shipbuilders who wanted to escape the congested city, while staying close enough to the centre (within two hours on horseback) to take care of their ships and their cargos.

== Neighboring communes ==
- Saint-Malo, to the west
- Cancale, to the east
- Saint-Méloir-des-Ondes, to the south
- North is the sea

== References in popular culture ==
Saint-Coulomb is the location for Claude Chabrol's 1995 thriller La Cérémonie

== See also ==
- Communes of the Ille-et-Vilaine department
