= Miniac-Morvan =

Miniac-Morvan Meinyac-Morvan (Gallo) Minieg-Morvan (Breton)
- Commune
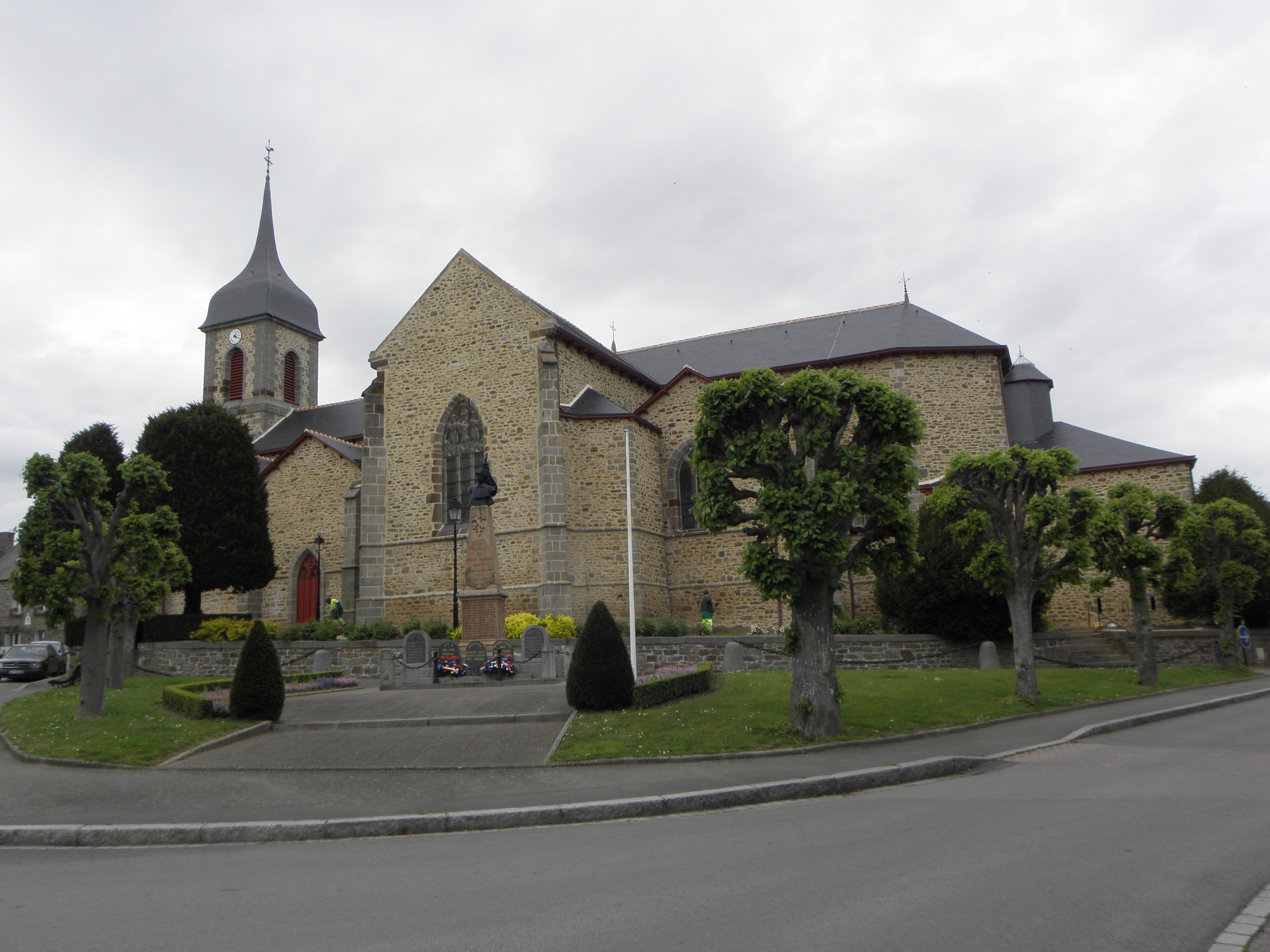
- The church of Saint-Pierre and the war memorial

- Coat of arms
- Location of Miniac-Morvan
- Location within France Location within Brittany
- Coordinates: 48°30′56″N 1°53′56″W
- Country: France
- Region: Brittany
- Department: Ille-et-Vilaine
- Arrondissement: Saint-Malo
- Canton: Dol-de-Bretagne
- Intercommunality: CA Pays de Saint-Malo

Government
  - Mayor (2020–2026): Olivier Compain
- Area^{1}: 31.03 km^{2} (11.98 sq mi)
- Highest elevation: 68 m (223 ft)
- Lowest elevation: 2 m (6.6 ft)
- Population (2023): 4,408
  - Density: 142.1/km^{2} (367.9/sq mi)
- Time zone: UTC+01:00 (CET)
  - Summer (DST): UTC+02:00 (CEST)
- INSEE/Postal code: 35179 /35540
- ^{1} French Land Register data, which excludes lakes, ponds, glaciers > 1 km^{2} (0.386 sq mi or 247 acres) and river estuaries.

Miniac-Morvan (French pronunciation: [minjak mɔʁvɑ̃]; Breton: Minieg-Morvan; Gallo: Meinyac-Morvan) is a commune in the Ille-et-Vilaine department in Brittany in northwestern France.

== Population ==
Inhabitants of Miniac-Morvan are called Miniacois in French.

Historical population
Year	Pop.	±% p.a.
1968	2,244	—
1975	2,161	−0.54%
1982	2,595	+2.65%
1990	2,815	+1.02%
1999	2,784	−0.12%
2007	3,354	+2.36%
2012	3,738	+2.19%
2017	3,931	+1.01%
2023	4,408	+1.93%
Source: INSEE

== See also ==
- Communes of the Ille-et-Vilaine department
