= Canton of Saint-Malo-1 =

Coordinates: 48.65°N 2.02°W

- Canton
- Country: France
- Region: Brittany
- Department: Ille-et-Vilaine
- No. of communes: {{{nbcomm}}}
- Population (2023): 46,198
- INSEE code: 35 25

The canton of Saint-Malo-1 is an administrative division of the Ille-et-Vilaine department, in northwestern France. It was created at the French canton reorganisation which came into effect in March 2015. Its seat is in Saint-Malo.

It consists of the following communes:

1. Cancale
2. La Gouesnière
3. Saint-Coulomb
4. Saint-Malo (partly)
5. Saint-Méloir-des-Ondes
