= Lillemer =

Lillemer Enez-Veur (Breton)
- Commune
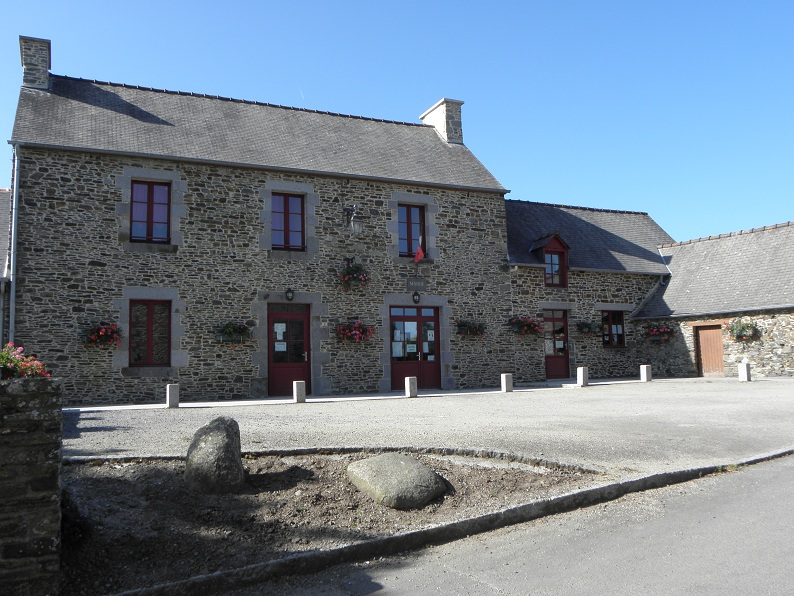
- The town hall of Lillemer
- Location of Lillemer
- Location within France Location within Brittany
- Coordinates: 48°33′56″N 1°51′33″W
- Country: France
- Region: Brittany
- Department: Ille-et-Vilaine
- Arrondissement: Saint-Malo
- Canton: Dol-de-Bretagne
- Intercommunality: CA Pays de Saint-Malo

Government
  - Mayor (2020–2026): David Jullien
- Area^{1}: 3.74 km^{2} (1.44 sq mi)
- Highest elevation: 13 m (43 ft)
- Lowest elevation: 1 m (3.3 ft)
- Population (2023): 398
  - Density: 106/km^{2} (276/sq mi)
- Time zone: UTC+01:00 (CET)
  - Summer (DST): UTC+02:00 (CEST)
- INSEE/Postal code: 35153 /35111
- ^{1} French Land Register data, which excludes lakes, ponds, glaciers > 1 km^{2} (0.386 sq mi or 247 acres) and river estuaries.

Lillemer (French pronunciation: [lilmɛʁ]; Breton: Enez-Veur) is a commune in the Ille-et-Vilaine department of Brittany in northwestern France. As of 2019, the population was 367.

== Population ==
Inhabitants of Lillemer are called in French lillemérois or lillemériens.

== Geography ==
The village of Lillemer is located on a rocky hill rising nine metres above the marsh that forms the drained floor of Mont-Saint-Michel Bay.

The land extending from the former shoreline to the present-day beach was formed by the accumulation of sediments over approximately 8,000 years. At the surface, it consists in the north of marine sediments, known as the "White Marshes", and in the south of peat formations, known as the "Black Marshes", which surround the Lillemer hill.

== See also ==
- Communes of the Ille-et-Vilaine department
