= Ille-et-Vilaine's 7th constituency =

Constituency of the National Assembly of France

7th constituency of Ille-et-Vilaine
- inline Constituency of the National Assembly of France

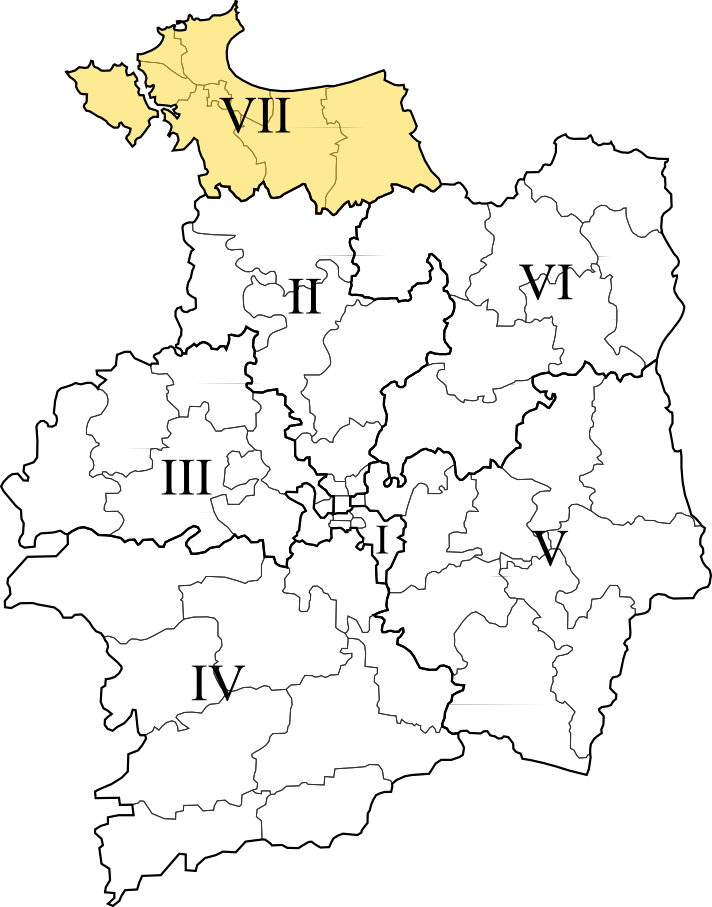
- Constituency in department

- Ille-et-Vilaine in France
- Deputy: Jean-Luc Bourgeaux; LR
- Department: Ille-et-Vilaine
- Cantons: (pre-2015) Cancale, Châteauneuf-d'Ille-et-Vilaine, Dinard, Dol-de-Bretagne, Pleine-Fougères, Saint-Malo Nord, Saint-Malo Sud

The 7th constituency of Ille-et-Vilaine is a French legislative constituency in the Ille-et-Vilaine département. Like the other 576 French constituencies, it elects one MP using the two-round system, with a run-off if no candidate receives over 50% of the vote in the first round.

== Geography ==
The constituency contains the historic French port town of Saint-Malo.

== Deputies ==
Election	Member	Party
1986	constituency created	
1988	René Couanau	UDF
1993	René Couanau	UDF
1997	René Couanau	UDF
2002	René Couanau	UMP
2007	René Couanau	UMP
2011	René Couanau	DVD
2012	Gilles Lurton	UMP
2017	Gilles Lurton	LR
2022	Jean-Luc Bourgeaux	LR

== Election results ==
=== 2024 ===
Candidate	Party	Alliance	First round			Second round		
Candidate	Party	Alliance	Votes	%	+/–	Votes	%	+/–
Jean-Luc Bourgeaux	LR	UDC	32,549	43.33	+17.91	50,315	69.50	
Dylan Lemoine	RN		21,184	28.20	+15.50	22,082	30.50	
Nicolas Guivarc’h	LFI	NFP	16,701	22.23	+0.97	withdrew		
Christophe Fichet	DVD		3,665	4.88	+3.04			
Edouard Descottes	LO		1,015	1.35	+0.69			
Votes			75,114	100.00			100.00	
Valid votes			75,114	98.00	-0.26	72,937	95.79	
Blank votes			1,095	1.43	+0.20	2,329	3.08	
Null votes			437	0.57	+0.06	855	1.13	
Turnout			76,646	71.87	+19.57	75,581	70.87	
Abstentions			30,003	28.13	-19.57	31,063	29.13	
Registered voters			106,649			106,644		
Result			LR HOLD					

=== 2022 ===
Legislative Election 2022: Ille-et-Vilaine's 7th constituency
Party	Candidate	Votes	%	±%
MoDem (Ensemble)	Anne Le Gagne	15,330	28.37	-8.24
LR (UDC)	Jean-Luc Bourgeaux	13,736	25.42	-9.39
LFI (NUPÉS)	Nicolas Guivarc'h	11,486	21.26	+14.40
RN	Dylan Lemoine	6,861	12.70	+4.70
REC	Leïla Rosenstech	1,970	3.65	N/A
Others	N/A	4,651	8.61	
Turnout		54,034	52.30	−2.51
2nd round result
LR (UDC)	Jean-Luc Bourgeaux	23,705	52.23	-3.98
MoDem (Ensemble)	Anne Le Gagne	21,681	47.77	+3.98
Turnout		45,386	48.03	−1.96
LR hold				

=== 2017 ===
Candidate	Label	First round		Second round	
Candidate	Label	Votes	%	Votes	%
Valérie Fribolle	REM	19,605	36.61	20,282	43.79
Gilles Lurton	LR	18,641	34.81	26,032	56.21
Philippe Miailhes	FN	4,286	8.00		
Solenn Hallou	DVG	4,044	7.55		
Nicolas Chevallier	FI	3,672	6.86		
Adel Malik-Monrocq	DIV	715	1.34		
Brieuc Quil	DVD	491	0.92		
Gwénola Bouriel	ECO	447	0.83		
Édouard Descottes	EXG	398	0.74		
Éliane Leclercq	REG	394	0.74		
Geneviève Drouard	ECO	311	0.58		
Guillaume Betend	DIV	243	0.45		
Jean-Michel Groisier	EXG	212	0.40		
Raoul Kuczyk	DIV	93	0.17		
Votes		53,552	100.00	46,314	100.00
Valid votes		53,552	98.55	46,314	93.45
Blank votes		542	1.00	2,312	4.67
Null votes		244	0.45	934	1.88
Turnout		54,338	54.81	49,560	49.99
Abstentions		44,802	45.19	49,582	50.01
Registered voters		99,140		99,142	
Source: Ministry of the Interior

=== 2012 ===
2012 legislative election in Ille-Et-Vilaine's 7th constituency
Candidate	Party	First round		Second round	
Candidate	Party	Votes	%	Votes	%
Isabelle Thomas	PS	17,678	31.33%	27,477	48.96%
Gilles Lurton	UMP dissident	11,946	21.17%	28,644	51.04%
Nicolas Belloir	UMP	10,130	17.95%		
Michel Penhouet	PRG	4,317	7.65%		
Pascal Clement	FN	4,249	7.53%		
Jean-Francis Richeux	AC	3,752	6.65%		
Carole Le Bechec	EELV	1,681	2.98%		
Solenn Hallou	FG	1,558	2.76%		
Pierre Chapa		376	0.67%		
Serge Monrocq	AEI	323	0.57%		
Emeline Berhault	JB (BNAFET)	247	0.44%		
Edouard Descottes	LO	170	0.30%		
Valid votes		56,427	98.76%	56,121	97.35%
Spoilt and null votes		706	1.24%	1,527	2.65%
Votes cast / turnout		57,133	60.06%	57,648	60.60%
Abstentions		37,999	39.94%	37,483	39.40%
Registered voters		95,132	100.00%	95,131	100.00%

=== 2007 ===
Legislative Election 2007: Ille-et-Vilaine's 7th constituency
Party	Candidate	Votes	%	±%
UMP	René Couanau	29,040	47.11	−4.60
PS	Isabelle Thomas	15,228	24.70	−1.63
MoDem	Jean-Francois Richeux	9,278	15.05	N/A
UDB	Henri Gourmelen	1,833	2.97	+1.53
LCR	Pierre Chapa	1,501	2.43	+0.63
FN	Patrick Le Guillou	1,417	2.30	−4.46
Others	N/A	3,349	-	−
Turnout		62,512	63.11	−2.32
2nd round result
UMP	René Couanau	32,745	57.00	N/A
PS	Isabelle Thomas	24,698	43.00	N/A
Turnout		59,211	59.78	N/A
UMP hold				

=== 2002 ===
Legislative Election 2002: Ille-et-Vilaine's 7th constituency
Party	Candidate	Votes	%	±%
UMP	René Couanau	30,963	51.71	N/A
PS	Isabelle Thomas	15,768	26.33	+2.43
FN	Monique Beaujan	4,050	6.76	−2.60
LV	Yannick Lebrelot	1,800	3.01	−0.86
CPNT	Jean-Pierre Héry	1,478	2.47	N/A
LCR	Pierre Chapa	1,080	1.80	+1.01
PCF	Jean-Charles Le Sager	1,055	1.76	−3.55
UDB	Henri Gourmelen	864	1.44	−0.78
LO	Jeanne Toupet	647	1.08	N/A
MEI	Serge Monrocq	514	0.86	N/A
MNR	Patrick Le Guillou	491	0.82	N/A
GE	Claude Ollivro	432	0.72	−6.31
MRC	Nicole Madiot	300	0.50	N/A
PT	Jean-Michel Groisier	277	0.46	−0.69
DVD	Jacques Béraud	164	0.27	N/A
Turnout		59,883	65.43	−1.82
UMP gain from FD				

=== 1997 ===
Legislative Election 1997: Ille-et-Vilaine's 7th constituency
Party	Candidate	Votes	%	±%
FD (UDF)	René Couanau	22,046	39.26	
PS	Isabelle Thomas	13,423	23.90	
FN	Jacques Dore	5,256	9.36	
GE	Brice Lalonde	3,946	7.03	
PCF	Jean-Charles Le Sager	2,982	5.31	
LV	Yannick Le Brelot	2,172	3.87	
LDI	Christophe Bastide	1,313	2.34	
REG	Henri Gourmelen	1,249	2.22	
PRG	Alain Berbouche	1,219	2.17	
Others	N/A	2,551	-	
Turnout		59,282	67.25	
2nd round result
FD (UDF)	René Couanau	31,971	53.93	
PS	Isabelle Thomas	27,313	46.07	
Turnout		62,476	70.88	
FD hold				

=== 1993 ===
Legislative Election 1993: Ille-et-Vilaine 7th
Party	Candidate	Votes	%	±%
UDF	René Couanau	35,027	65.08	
PS	Isabelle Thomas	18,793	34.92	
Turnout		53,280	66.56	
UDF hold		Swing		
