= Hirel =

Hirel Hiraèu (Gallo)
- Commune
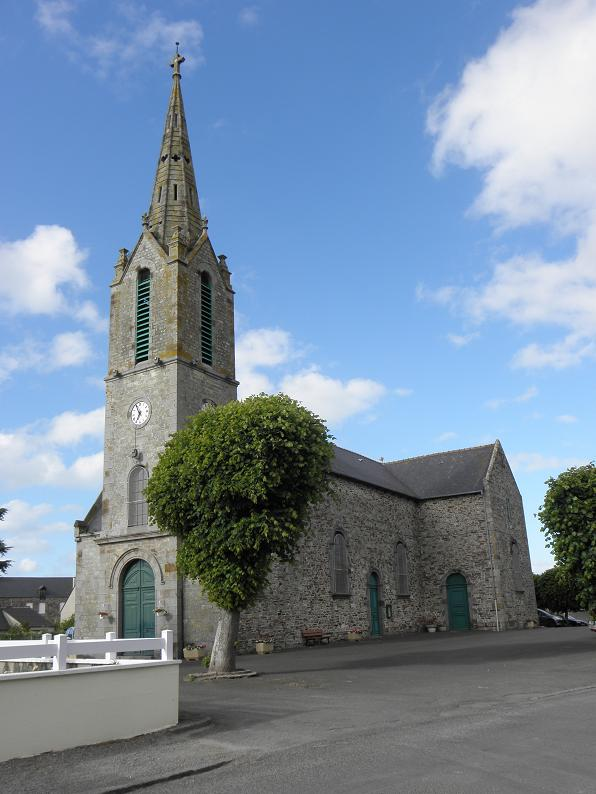
- The church of Notre-Dame, in Hirel

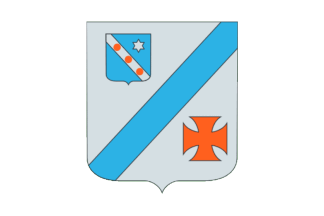
- Flag Coat of arms
- Location of Hirel
- Location within France Location within Brittany
- Coordinates: 48°36′23″N 1°48′01″W
- Country: France
- Region: Brittany
- Department: Ille-et-Vilaine
- Arrondissement: Saint-Malo
- Canton: Dol-de-Bretagne
- Intercommunality: CA Pays de Saint-Malo

Government
  - Mayor (2020–2026): Michel Hardouin
- Area^{1}: 9.85 km^{2} (3.80 sq mi)
- Highest elevation: 9 m (30 ft)
- Lowest elevation: 1 m (3.3 ft)
- Population (2023): 1,382
  - Density: 140/km^{2} (363/sq mi)
- Time zone: UTC+01:00 (CET)
  - Summer (DST): UTC+02:00 (CEST)
- INSEE/Postal code: 35132 /35120
- ^{1} French Land Register data, which excludes lakes, ponds, glaciers > 1 km^{2} (0.386 sq mi or 247 acres) and river estuaries.

Hirel (French pronunciation: [iʁɛl]; Breton: Hirel; Gallo: Hiraèu) is a commune in the Ille-et-Vilaine department in Brittany in northwestern France.

== Population ==
Inhabitants of Hirel are called Hirélois in French.

Historical population
Year	Pop.	±% p.a.
1968	1,005	—
1975	1,051	+0.64%
1982	1,286	+2.92%
1990	1,166	−1.22%
1999	1,172	+0.06%
2007	1,335	+1.64%
2012	1,363	+0.42%
2017	1,392	+0.42%
2023	1,382	−0.12%
Source: INSEE

== See also ==
- Communes of the Ille-et-Vilaine department
