= René Couanau =

French politician (1936–2024)

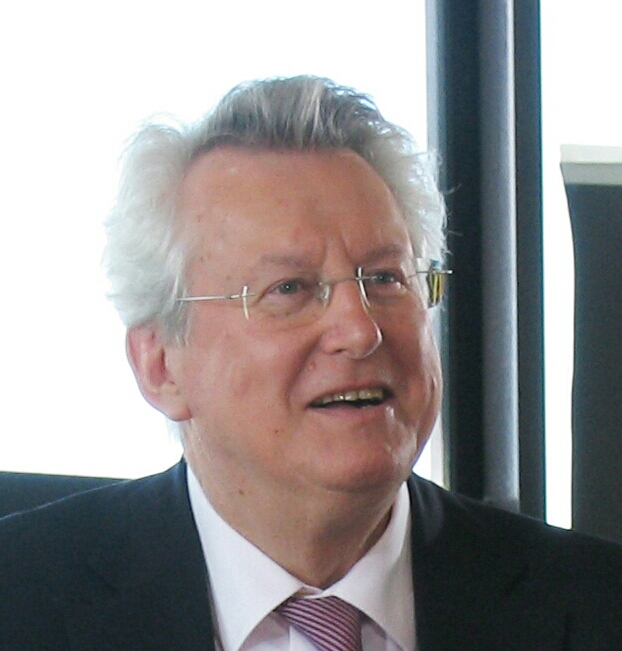
- Couanau in 2006

Mayor of Saint-Malo
- In office 25 March 1989 – 4 April 2014
- Preceded by: Marcel Planchet
- Succeeded by: Claude Renoult

Member of the National Assembly for Ille-et-Vilaine's 7th constituency
- In office 23 June 1988 – 19 June 2012
- Preceded by: New constituency
- Succeeded by: Gilles Lurton

Personal details
- Born: 10 July 1936 Saint-Malo, France
- Died: 30 November 2024 (aged 88) Saint-Malo, France
- Party: UMP (2002–2010)
- Other political affiliations: UDF (until 2002)
- Education: ÉNA

René Couanau (10 July 1936 – 30 November 2024) was a French politician who was a member of the National Assembly of France between 1988 and 2012. He represented the Ille-et-Vilaine department, and was a member of the Union for a Popular Movement.

From 1989, he was mayor of Saint-Malo, the second largest city in Ille-et-Vilaine, but was defeated 30 March 2014 by his former deputy major Claude Renoult.

Couanau died in Saint-Malo on 30 November 2024, at the age of 88.
