= La Gouesnière =

La Gouesnière Gouenaer (Breton)
- Commune
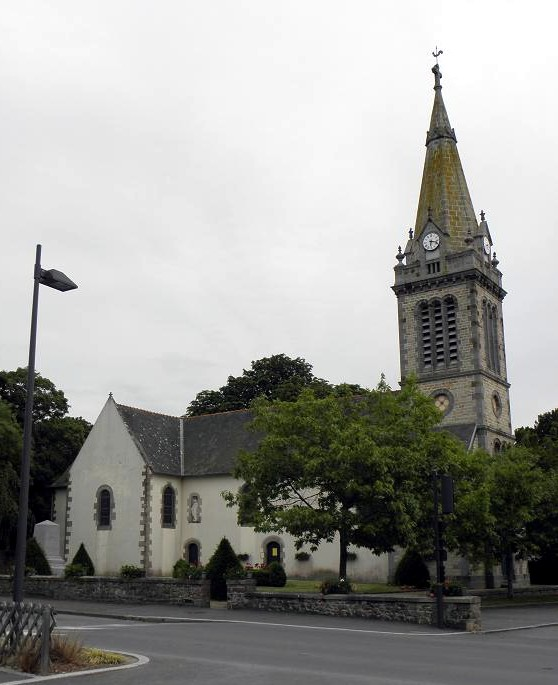
- The church in La Gouesnière

- Coat of arms
- Location of La Gouesnière
- Location within France Location within Brittany
- Coordinates: 48°36′22″N 1°53′34″W
- Country: France
- Region: Brittany
- Department: Ille-et-Vilaine
- Arrondissement: Saint-Malo
- Canton: Saint-Malo-1
- Intercommunality: CA Pays de Saint-Malo

Government
  - Mayor (2020–2026): Joël Hamel
- Area^{1}: 8.74 km^{2} (3.37 sq mi)
- Highest elevation: 47 m (154 ft)
- Lowest elevation: 2 m (6.6 ft)
- Population (2023): 2,021
  - Density: 231/km^{2} (599/sq mi)
- Time zone: UTC+01:00 (CET)
  - Summer (DST): UTC+02:00 (CEST)
- INSEE/Postal code: 35122 /35350
- ^{1} French Land Register data, which excludes lakes, ponds, glaciers > 1 km^{2} (0.386 sq mi or 247 acres) and river estuaries.

La Gouesnière (French pronunciation: [la ɡwɛnjɛʁ]; Breton: Gouenaer) is a commune in the Ille-et-Vilaine department of Brittany in northwestern France.

Charles de Gaulle, on a trip to Brittany, stopped in the city on 11 September 1960 before joining Saint-Malo.

La Gouesnière is twinned with Saint-Désert wine village, in the heart of the Burgundy vineyard, quoted in the poem of Aragon, The conscript of the hundred villages, written as an act of intellectual Resistance in a clandestine way in the spring of 1943, during the Second World War.

== Population ==
Historical population
Year	Pop.	±% p.a.
1968	669	—
1975	799	+2.57%
1982	908	+1.84%
1990	942	+0.46%
1999	1,068	+1.40%
2007	1,645	+5.55%
2012	1,678	+0.40%
2017	1,893	+2.44%
2023	2,021	+1.10%
Source: INSEE

Inhabitants of La Gouesnière are called Gouesnériens in French.

== See also ==
- Communes of the Ille-et-Vilaine department
