= Plerguer =

Plerguer Plergar (Breton)
- Commune
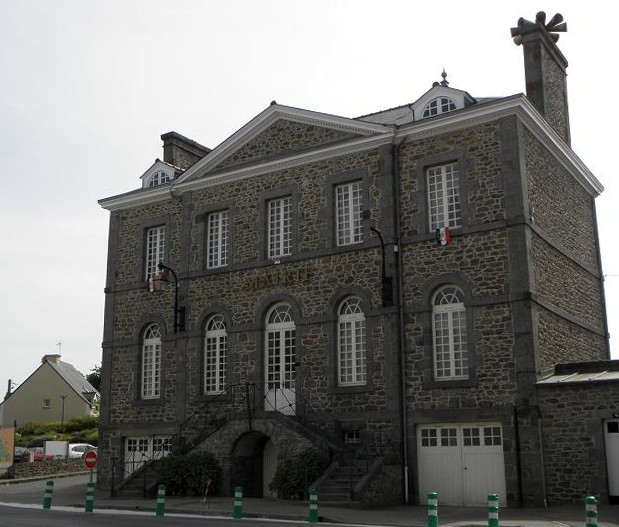
- The town hall in Plerguer

- Coat of arms
- Location of Plerguer
- Location within France Location within Brittany
- Coordinates: 48°31′38″N 1°50′46″W
- Country: France
- Region: Brittany
- Department: Ille-et-Vilaine
- Arrondissement: Saint-Malo
- Canton: Dol-de-Bretagne
- Intercommunality: CA Pays de Saint-Malo

Government
  - Mayor (2020–2026): Jean-Luc Beaudoin
- Area^{1}: 20.19 km^{2} (7.80 sq mi)
- Highest elevation: 78 m (256 ft)
- Lowest elevation: 2 m (6.6 ft)
- Population (2023): 2,895
  - Density: 143.4/km^{2} (371.4/sq mi)
- Time zone: UTC+01:00 (CET)
  - Summer (DST): UTC+02:00 (CEST)
- INSEE/Postal code: 35224 /35540
- ^{1} French Land Register data, which excludes lakes, ponds, glaciers > 1 km^{2} (0.386 sq mi or 247 acres) and river estuaries.

Plerguer (French pronunciation: [plɛʁɡɛʁ]; Breton: Plergar) is a commune in the Ille-et-Vilaine department of Brittany in northwestern France.

== Population ==
Inhabitants of Plerguer are called in French Plerguerrois.

Historical population
Year	Pop.	±% p.a.
1968	1,552	—
1975	1,682	+1.16%
1982	1,749	+0.56%
1990	1,853	+0.72%
1999	1,772	−0.50%
2007	2,175	+2.59%
2012	2,412	+2.09%
2017	2,722	+2.45%
2023	2,895	+1.03%
Source: INSEE

== See also ==
- Communes of the Ille-et-Vilaine department
