= La Fresnais =

La Fresnais An Onneg (Breton)
- Commune
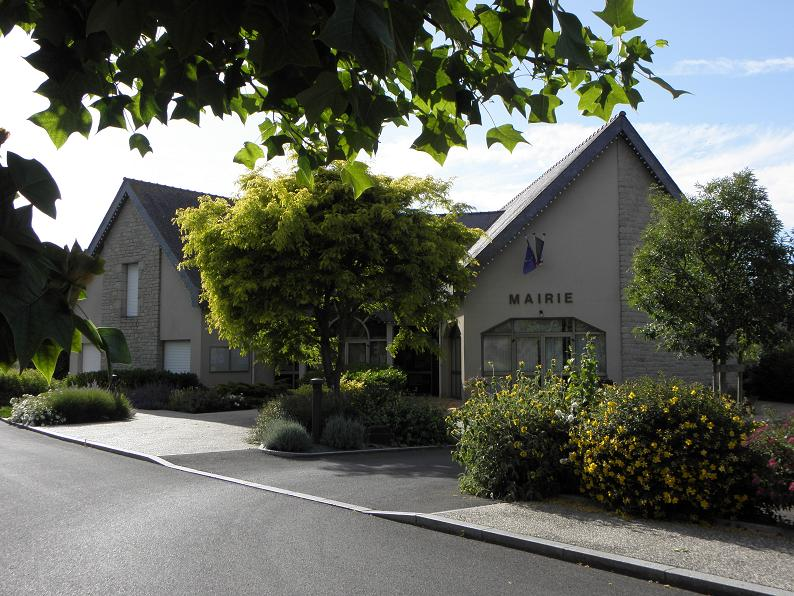
- Town hall
- Location of La Fresnais
- Location within France Location within Brittany
- Coordinates: 48°35′47″N 1°50′32″W
- Country: France
- Region: Brittany
- Department: Ille-et-Vilaine
- Arrondissement: Saint-Malo
- Canton: Dol-de-Bretagne
- Intercommunality: CA Pays de Saint-Malo

Government
  - Mayor (2020–2026): Éric Poussin
- Area^{1}: 14.43 km^{2} (5.57 sq mi)
- Highest elevation: 8 m (26 ft)
- Lowest elevation: 1 m (3.3 ft)
- Population (2023): 2,509
  - Density: 173.9/km^{2} (450.3/sq mi)
- Time zone: UTC+01:00 (CET)
  - Summer (DST): UTC+02:00 (CEST)
- INSEE/Postal code: 35116 /35111
- ^{1} French Land Register data, which excludes lakes, ponds, glaciers > 1 km^{2} (0.386 sq mi or 247 acres) and river estuaries.

La Fresnais (French pronunciation: [la fʁɛnɛ]; Breton: An Onneg) is a commune in the Ille-et-Vilaine department of Brittany in north-western France.

== Population ==
Inhabitants of La Fresnais are called Fresnaisiens in French.

Historical population
Year	Pop.	±% p.a.
1968	1,652	—
1975	1,649	−0.03%
1982	1,778	+1.08%
1990	1,955	+1.19%
1999	1,948	−0.04%
2007	2,121	+1.07%
2012	2,272	+1.38%
2017	2,541	+2.26%
2023	2,509	−0.21%
Source: INSEE

== See also ==
- Communes of the Ille-et-Vilaine department
