= Cherrueix =

Cherrueix Chaéruér (Gallo) Kerruer (Breton)
- Commune
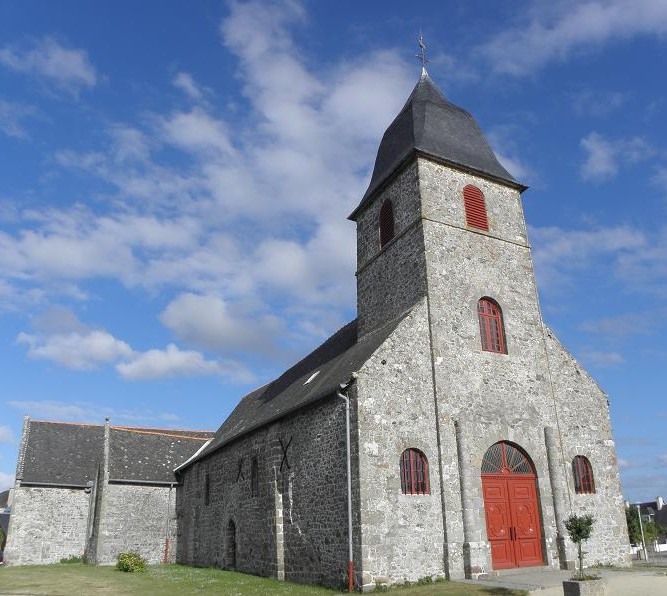
- Notre Dame church

- Coat of arms
- Location of Cherrueix
- Location within France Location within Brittany
- Coordinates: 48°36′20″N 1°42′35″W
- Country: France
- Region: Brittany
- Department: Ille-et-Vilaine
- Arrondissement: Saint-Malo
- Canton: Dol-de-Bretagne
- Intercommunality: Pays de Dol et Baie du Mont Saint-Michel

Government
  - Mayor (2020–2026): Jean-Michel Taillebois
- Area^{1}: 12.69 km^{2} (4.90 sq mi)
- Highest elevation: 9 m (30 ft)
- Lowest elevation: 1 m (3.3 ft)
- Population (2023): 1,108
  - Density: 87.31/km^{2} (226.1/sq mi)
- Time zone: UTC+01:00 (CET)
  - Summer (DST): UTC+02:00 (CEST)
- INSEE/Postal code: 35078 /35120
- ^{1} French Land Register data, which excludes lakes, ponds, glaciers > 1 km^{2} (0.386 sq mi or 247 acres) and river estuaries.

Cherrueix (French pronunciation: [ʃɛʁɥɛ]; Breton: Kerruer; Gallo: Chaéruér) is a commune in the Ille-et-Vilaine department of Brittany in northwestern France.

It lies between Mont Saint-Michel and Saint-Malo.

== Population ==
Inhabitants of Cherrueix are called Chérullais in French.

Historical population
Year	Pop.	±% p.a.
1968	997	—
1975	1,030	+0.47%
1982	1,016	−0.20%
1990	983	−0.41%
1999	955	−0.32%
2007	1,150	+2.35%
2012	1,131	−0.33%
2017	1,110	−0.37%
2023	1,108	−0.03%
Source: INSEE

== Geography ==
Cherrueix is a coastal town north of the department of Ille-et-Vilaine. Bordered by the Channel, this village of 1150 inhabitants, lies at the heart of the Breton part of the Bay of Mont Saint-Michel, twenty kilometers from Saint-Malo and 8 km from Dol-de-Bretagne (TGV to Paris). From the sea we see a clear lr Cancale, islands Chausey, Granville and finally Mount Saint-Michel.

From the perspective of the richness of flora, Cherrueix among the municipalities in the department with their different habitats in a large number of taxa, or 429 for an average of 348 taxa municipal and county a total of 1373 taxa (118 families).

== History ==
Several authors have claimed that the village had developed around a fortress built around 1030 by Robert Duke of Normandy in his war against the Britons. It is a mistake, Castle reported by the chroniclers of the time was that of Charuel Sacey in the Channel.

The development of Cherrueix was mainly carried by the sea where they have developed many small hamlets that form the town of Cherrueix. The land being used mainly engaged in farming.

Traditional buildings were made from mud walls and thatched roof. These buildings have been abandoned over time and have virtually disappeared, replaced by stone walls (including granite) and the slate roof.

With the 2005 arrival of the very speed train (TGV) Paris ↔ Dol-de-Bretagne Saint-Malo, the town is booming, the population is constantly growing. In 2014 the very speed railway Bretagne-Pays de la Loire will Dol-de-Bretagne in less than 2 hours to Paris.

Small subdivisions (a dozen houses) make their appearances in recent years or are under construction and recently in the year 2009 a major project 'Le Clos Gicquel' is under study.

Several environmental groups to ensure the protection and quality of life in this village.

== Sport ==
World Championship yachting in 2012 : Résultats

== Sights ==
=== Historic windmills ===
There are three nineteenth century windmills in Cherrueix. The mill of the Saline, the mill of the Colinassière and the mill Mondrins. These mills were listed by order on 7 September 1977.

They illustrate the significant activity of cereal Dol marshes. On the whole territory of the commune, there were up to eleven mills in operation. None are operating today.

=== Points of interest ===
The "Path deadlines". It is an old coastal road, including a branch, east of the town produced the name of a place called Lower Road, which passes 2.7 km west of the village to the hamlet of Street . At 4.3 km from Cherrueix the ancient chapel of St. Anne (St. Broladre) marks the eastern boundary of the former dune which was built early in the Middle Ages this road. The "Banc of Hermelle". Reef sandy developed by small marine worms manufacturers who make their habitat. The Bench of Hermelle extends over 100 hectares and reached 1.50 m in height. It is a unique site in Europe.

The dam of the Duchess Anne of Brittany or dike. Dyke dating from the thirteenth century and extending over 20 km long St. Méloir des Ondes (peak Richeux castle) to the chapel of St. Anne. Throughout this dike, walkers and joggers can contemplate a variety of landscapes, marshes, polders, strikes.

Notre Dame de la Garde. Statue of the Virgin erected in 1888 on the embankment facing the beach and the Channel at low tide withdrew to 7 km. On 7 May 1888 Father Richard and Father Blanchard visited the parishioners asking them if they wanted to make an offering to build a rock surmounted by a cast iron statue of the Virgin. Thanks to the generosity of everyone, the money was quickly assembled. Armed with permissions of the dikes and marshes, and the agreement of Cardinal Place Charles de Rennes to give the name of "Notre-Dame-de-la-Garde" at the future monument, the statue has been erected to protect the bay, fishermen, sailors and farmers. The inauguration took place on 19 August 1888 with all the clergy and priests from many surrounding municipalities. The roads are converted into leafy avenue, triumphal arches high, anchors it all done in shells. In the procession we see that children are the attributes of trades of common wheat sheaf, fisherman's net. Six thousand people attended the blessing of the statue after hearing the cannon announcing the ceremony.

Church. Church of the fifteenth century and built from the shape of a boat. It consists of a nave and a Romanesque gothic heart

House seafront building formerly used as a public school for girls and restored in 2005. It now hosts the public library, exhibition space and meeting and associations cherrulaises.

The memorial of the Great War. Built in 1921 and became obsolete, it was rebuilt in 2006. Under pressure from activists of secularism, the cross which surmounted was sawed, although the monument with an initial, had been blessed, and that the vast majority of the Dead for France this was a Christian village in Brittany.

The Manor Alms. The castle, home of the "lords of the charity. The land known charities in the Middle Ages were still church property, offered to God through piety. The word charity means a house that belonged to a church or a monastery, to which were annexed income for the poor. It is probable that this manor had a religious origin and was later secularized. It is a Louis XIII building with gerbières with pediments and cornices rounded modillonnées, his door is surmounted by an arch (dated 1619). It was the Uguet Cherrueix lords in 1460, of the Cherrueix in 1513, the League for Franchet, Uguet to the eighteenth century. The Lord of the Alms was considered lord of the parish founding. After becoming a farm, it is now converted into a farmhouse and gîte d'étape (22 spaces for horses). A campground is also furnished and can accommodate tents and caravans.

Train Marin can explore in light of the tidal bench Hermel and fisheries wood dating from the twelfth century.

The beach offers views of the sea mussel in the low tide, Cancale and the Mont Saint-Michel.

The mussel. These stakes (stakes) of wood surrounded by mussels in the middle bay visible at low tide.

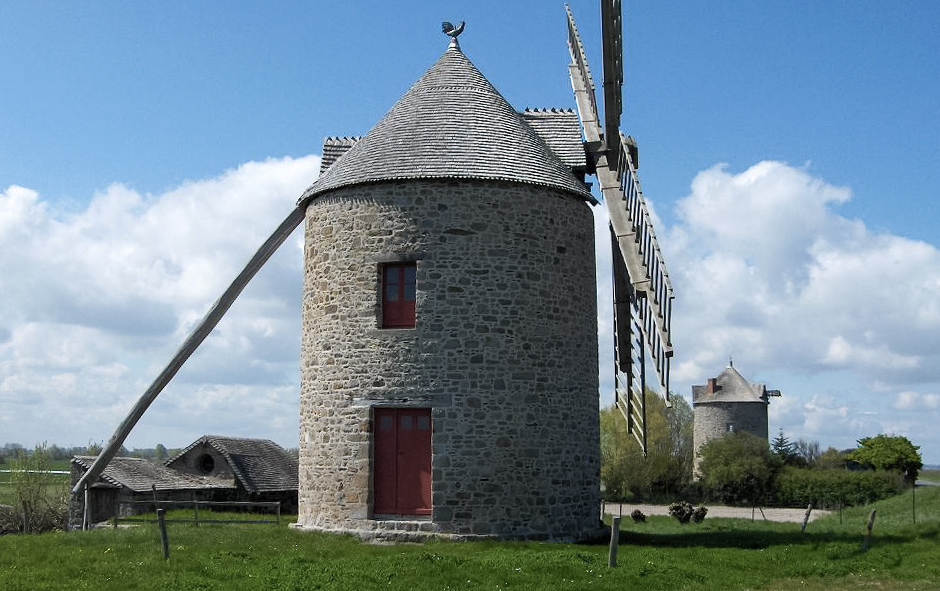
One of Mills 'The Saline'

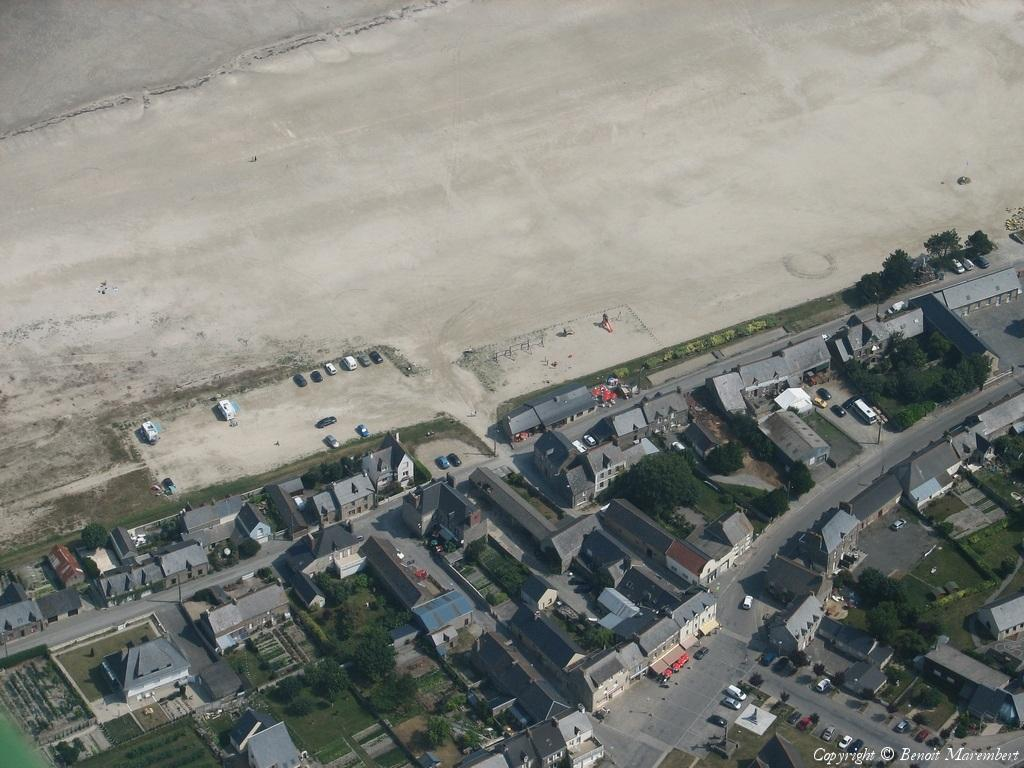
The beach and the borough of Cherrueix

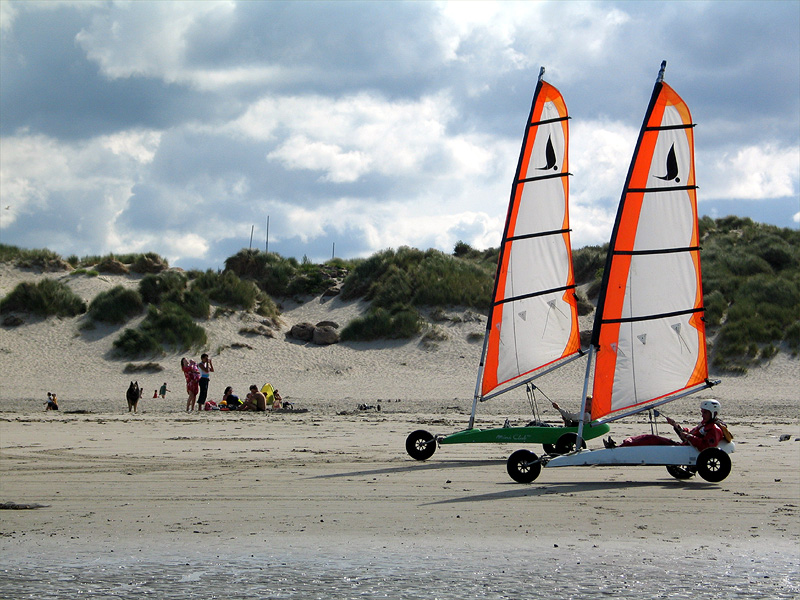
Land sailing on the beach

== See also ==
- Communes of the Ille-et-Vilaine department
