= Canton of Dol-de-Bretagne =

Coordinates: 48.5572°N 1.7459°W

Dol-de-Bretagne
- Canton
- Country: France
- Region: Brittany
- Department: Ille-et-Vilaine
- No. of communes: {{{nbcomm}}}
- Area: 452.48 km^{2} (174.70 sq mi)
- Population (2023): 45,479
  - Density: 100.51/km^{2} (260.32/sq mi)
- INSEE code: 35 07

The Canton of Dol-de-Bretagne is a canton of France, in the Ille-et-Vilaine département, located in the north of the department. At the French canton reorganisation which came into effect in March 2015, the canton was expanded from 8 to 31 communes.

It consists of the following communes:

1. Baguer-Morvan
2. Baguer-Pican
3. La Boussac
4. Broualan
5. Châteauneuf-d'Ille-et-Vilaine
6. Cherrueix
7. Dol-de-Bretagne
8. Epiniac
9. La Fresnais
10. Hirel
11. Lillemer
12. Miniac-Morvan
13. Mont-Dol
14. Pleine-Fougères
15. Plerguer
16. Roz-Landrieux
17. Roz-sur-Couesnon
18. Sains
19. Saint-Benoît-des-Ondes
20. Saint-Broladre
21. Saint-Georges-de-Gréhaigne
22. Saint-Guinoux
23. Saint-Marcan
24. Saint-Père-Marc-en-Poulet
25. Saint-Suliac
26. Sougeal
27. Trans-la-Forêt
28. Le Tronchet
29. Vieux-Viel
30. La Ville-ès-Nonais
31. Le Vivier-sur-Mer
