= Jacky Le Menn =

French politician (1941–2025)

Le Menn in 2017

Jacky Le Menn (17 March 1941 – 13 July 2025) was a French politician who was a member of the Senate. He represented the Ille-et-Vilaine department from 2008 to 2014, and was a member of the Socialist Party. Born in Rive-de-Gier on 17 March 1941, he died on 13 July 2025, at the age of 84.

== Sources ==
- Page on the Senate website (in French)
