= Saint-Benoît-des-Ondes =

Saint-Benoît-des-Ondes Lanwezoù (Breton)
- Commune
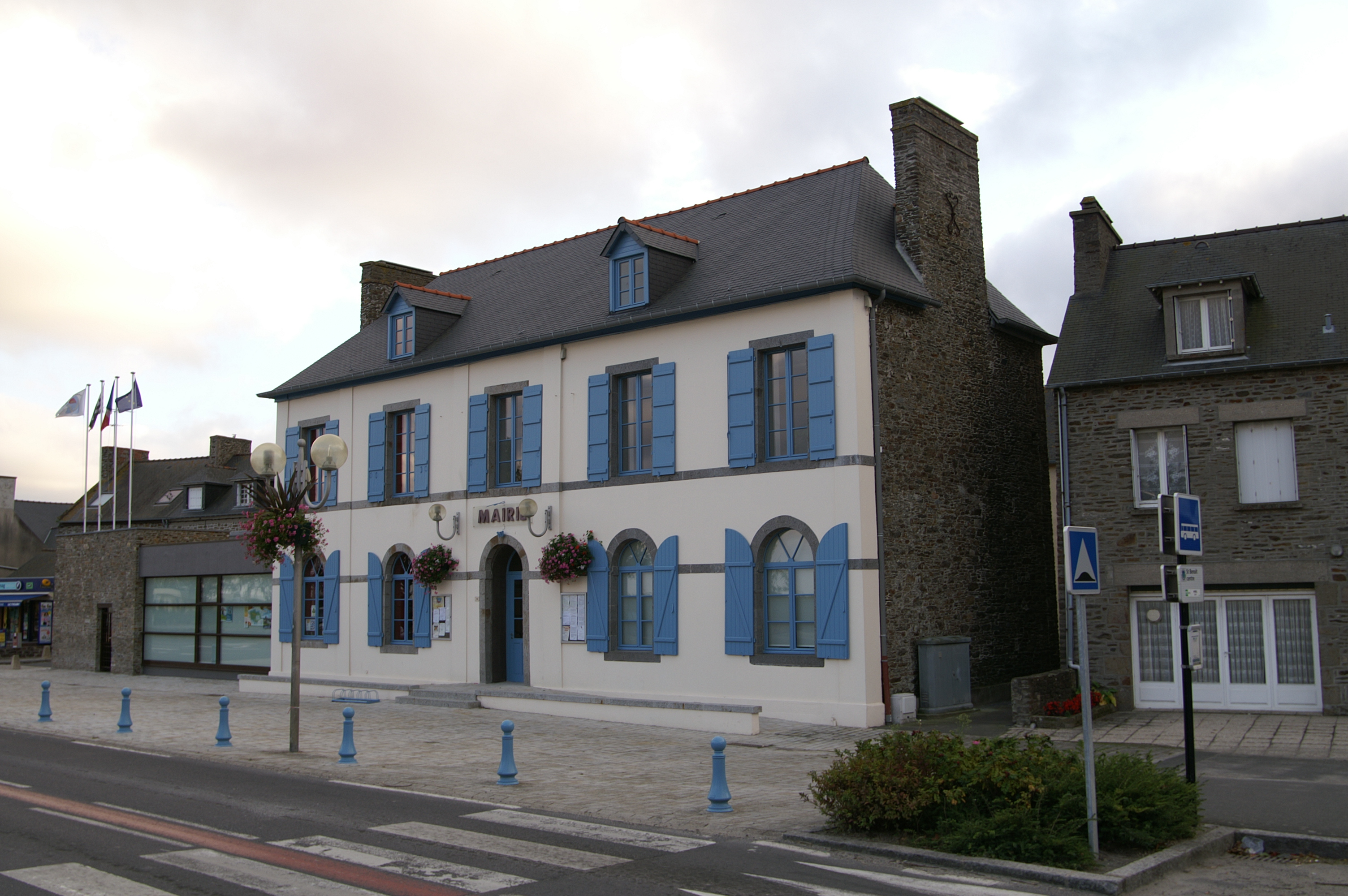
- The town hall of Saint-Benoît-des-Ondes

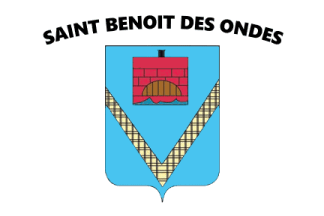
- Flag
- Location of Saint-Benoît-des-Ondes
- Location within France Location within Brittany
- Coordinates: 48°37′14″N 1°51′01″W
- Country: France
- Region: Brittany
- Department: Ille-et-Vilaine
- Arrondissement: Saint-Malo
- Canton: Dol-de-Bretagne
- Intercommunality: CA Pays de Saint-Malo

Government
  - Mayor (2020–2026): Bernadette Letanoux
- Area^{1}: 2.92 km^{2} (1.13 sq mi)
- Highest elevation: 10 m (33 ft)
- Lowest elevation: 2 m (6.6 ft)
- Population (2023): 975
  - Density: 334/km^{2} (865/sq mi)
- Time zone: UTC+01:00 (CET)
  - Summer (DST): UTC+02:00 (CEST)
- INSEE/Postal code: 35255 /35114
- ^{1} French Land Register data, which excludes lakes, ponds, glaciers > 1 km^{2} (0.386 sq mi or 247 acres) and river estuaries.

Saint-Benoît-des-Ondes (French pronunciation: [sɛ̃ bənwa de.z‿ɔ̃d]; Breton: Lanwezoù) is a commune in the Ille-et-Vilaine Department in Brittany in northwestern France.

== Population ==
Inhabitants of Saint-Benoît-des-Ondes are called bénédictins in French.

Historical population
Year	Pop.	±% p.a.
1968	556	—
1975	547	−0.23%
1982	612	+1.62%
1990	775	+3.00%
1999	799	+0.34%
2007	1,105	+4.14%
2012	1,054	−0.94%
2017	994	−1.17%
2023	975	−0.32%
Source: INSEE

== See also ==
- Communes of the Ille-et-Vilaine department
