= Communauté d'agglomération du Pays de Saint-Malo =

Coordinates: 48°36′N 1°57′W

Pays de Saint-Malo
- Communauté d'agglomération
- Interactive map of Pays de Saint-Malo
- Country: France
- Region: Brittany
- Department: Ille-et-Vilaine
- No. of communes: {{{nbcomm}}}
- Established: 2001
- Area: 245.5 km^{2} (94.8 sq mi)
- Population (2018): 83,853
  - Density: 341.6/km^{2} (884.6/sq mi)

The Communauté d'agglomération du Pays de Saint-Malo (also: Saint-Malo Agglomération) is the communauté d'agglomération, an intercommunal structure, centred on the city of Saint-Malo. It is located in the Ille-et-Vilaine department, in the Brittany region, western France. It was created in January 2001. Its seat is in Cancale. Its area is 245.5 km^{2}. Its population was 83,853 in 2014, of which 46,478 in Saint-Malo proper.

== Composition ==
The communauté d'agglomération consists of the following 18 communes:

1. Cancale
2. Châteauneuf-d'Ille-et-Vilaine
3. La Fresnais
4. La Gouesnière
5. Hirel
6. Lillemer
7. Miniac-Morvan
8. Plerguer
9. Saint-Benoît-des-Ondes
10. Saint-Coulomb
11. Saint-Guinoux
12. Saint-Jouan-des-Guérets
13. Saint-Malo
14. Saint-Méloir-des-Ondes
15. Saint-Père-Marc-en-Poulet
16. Saint-Suliac
17. Le Tronchet
18. La Ville-ès-Nonais
