= Saint-Méloir-des-Ondes =

Saint-Méloir-des-Ondes Saent-Mleï (Gallo) Sant-Meleg (Breton)
- Commune
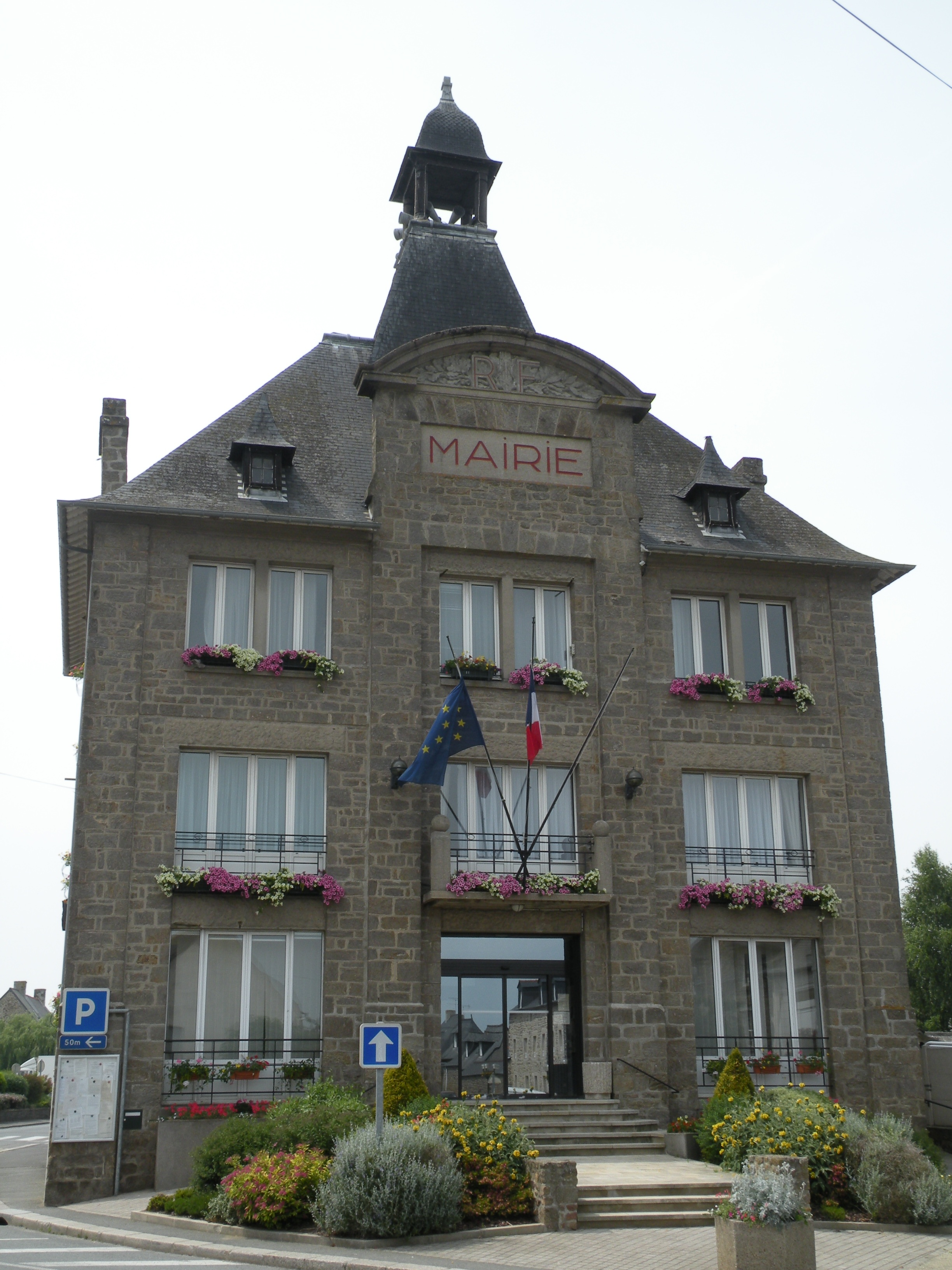
- The town hall of Saint-Méloir-des-Ondes

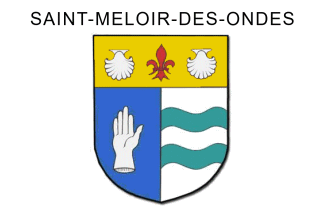
- Flag Coat of arms
- Location of Saint-Méloir-des-Ondes
- Location within France Location within Brittany
- Coordinates: 48°38′18″N 1°54′06″W
- Country: France
- Region: Brittany
- Department: Ille-et-Vilaine
- Arrondissement: Saint-Malo
- Canton: Saint-Malo-1
- Intercommunality: CA Pays de Saint-Malo

Government
  - Mayor (2020–2026): Dominique De La Portbarre
- Area^{1}: 29.49 km^{2} (11.39 sq mi)
- Elevation: 51 m (167 ft)
- Highest elevation: 58 m (190 ft)
- Lowest elevation: 2 m (6.6 ft)
- Population (2023): 4,720
  - Density: 160/km^{2} (415/sq mi)
- Time zone: UTC+01:00 (CET)
  - Summer (DST): UTC+02:00 (CEST)
- INSEE/Postal code: 35299 /35350
- ^{1} French Land Register data, which excludes lakes, ponds, glaciers > 1 km^{2} (0.386 sq mi or 247 acres) and river estuaries.

Saint-Méloir-des-Ondes (French pronunciation: [sɛ̃ melwaʁ de.z‿ɔ̃d]; Gallo: Saent-Mleï, Breton: Sant-Meleg) is a commune in the Ille-et-Vilaine department in Brittany in northwestern France. It is located near Saint-Malo.

The parish was named after St Melor a Breton and Cornish saint, by the monks of Mont Saint-Michel, who established a priory there in the early 11th century.

== Population ==
Inhabitants of Saint-Méloir-des-Ondes are called méloriens in French.

Historical population
Year	Pop.	±% p.a.
1968	2,486	—
1975	2,320	−0.98%
1982	2,322	+0.01%
1990	2,588	+1.36%
1999	2,995	+1.64%
2007	3,480	+1.89%
2012	3,780	+1.67%
2017	4,086	+1.57%
2023	4,720	+2.43%
Source: INSEE

== See also ==
- Communes of the Ille-et-Vilaine department
