= Maure (disambiguation) =

Maure, also known as Moor's head, is a symbol depicting the head of a black moor.

Maure may also refer to:

== People ==
=== Maure ===
- Auguste Maure (1840–1907), French photographer
- José Cazorla Maure, (1903–1940), Spanish communist leader
- Michel Maure (b. 1951), French medical doctor

=== le Maure ===
- Catherine Le Maure (fl. 1386/88–1401), French noblewoman
- Erard III Le Maure, Baron of Arcadia in the mid-14th century
- Nicholas le Maure (fl. 1297–1315/6), French knight

=== de Sainte-Maure ===
- Benoît de Sainte-Maure (died 1173), French poet
- Catherine de Sainte-Maure, (1587–1648), French courtier
- Charles de Sainte-Maure, duc de Montausier (1610–1690), French soldier and political figure

== Places ==
- Maure, Pyrénées-Atlantiques, a commune in south-western France
- Maure-de-Bretagne, a former commune in north-western France
  - Canton of Maure-de-Bretagne, a former canton in north-western France
- Sainte-Maure, a commune in north-eastern France
- Sainte-Maure-de-Peyriac, a commune in south-western France
- Sainte-Maure-de-Touraine, a commune in west-central France

== Other uses ==
- Maure Castle, a fictional location in the Dungeons & Dragons fantasy role-playing game
- Sainte-Maure de Touraine, a type of French cheese

== See also ==
- Maura (disambiguation)
- Maures, or Moors
