= Mathilde Hignet =

French politician

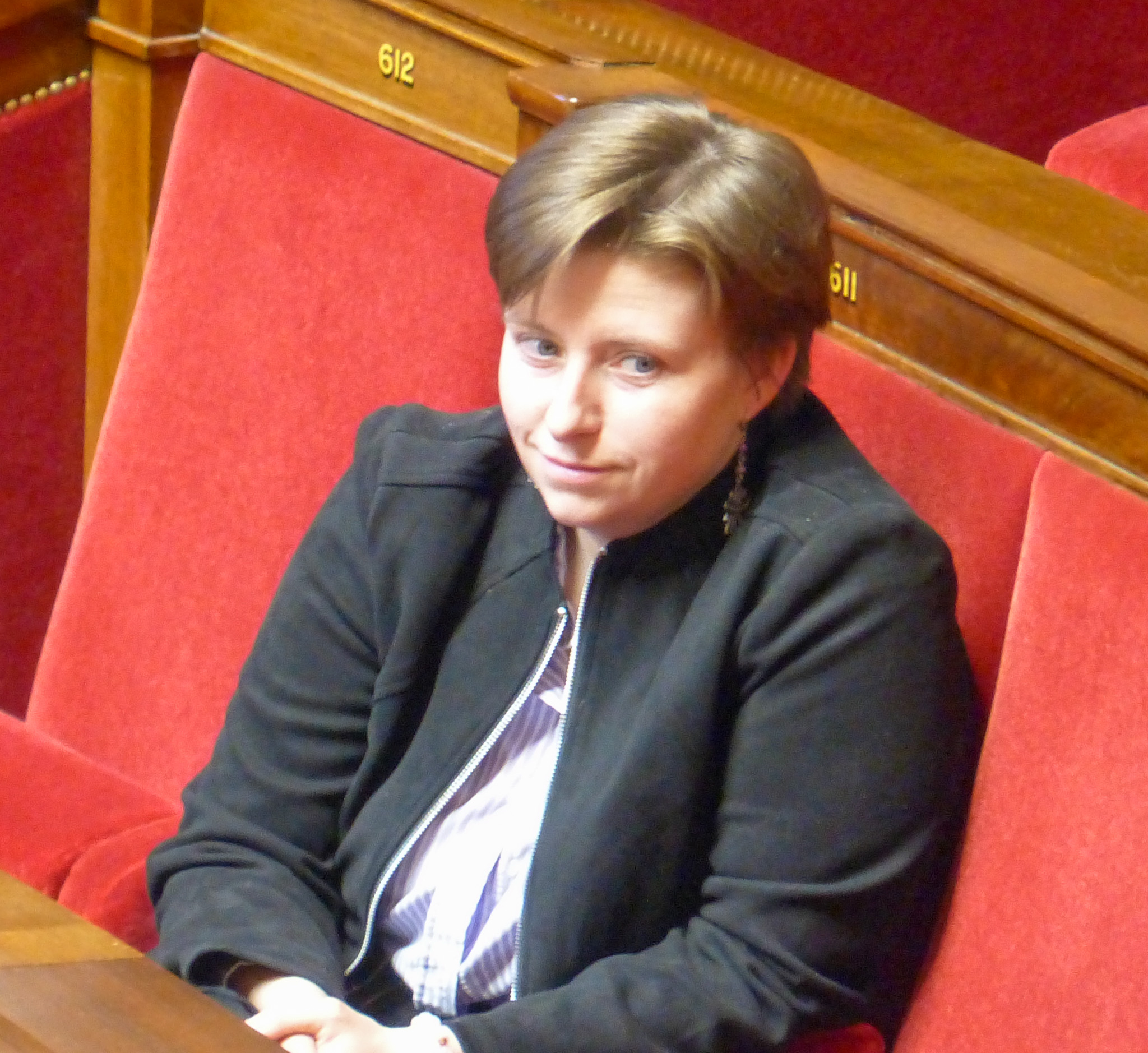

Member of the National Assembly for Ille-et-Vilaine's 4th constituency
- Incumbent
- Assumed office 22 June 2022
- Preceded by: Gaël Le Bohec

Personal details
- Born: 10 June 1993 (age 33) Rennes, France
- Party: La France Insoumise
- Occupation: politician

Mathilde Hignet (born 10 June 1993) is a French politician from La France Insoumise. She was elected as the member of parliament for Ille-et-Vilaine's 4th constituency in the 2022 French legislative election.

== Biography ==
Mathilde Hignet was born on June 10, 1993, in Rennes. The daughter of organic farmers and the granddaughter and great-granddaughter of farmers, she grew up in La Chapelle-Bouëxic (Ille-et-Vilaine). She holds a high school diploma in agricultural science and technology (STAV, agricultural baccalaureate) and a professional qualification certificate as a kitchen assistant. She works as a farm laborer on her parents' fruit farm and has also worked in a Établissement d'hébergement pour personnes âgées dépendantes (Ehpad).

== See also ==
- List of deputies of the 16th National Assembly of France
