= Ille-et-Vilaine's 4th constituency =

Constituency of the National Assembly of France

4th constituency of Ille-et-Vilaine
- inline Constituency of the National Assembly of France

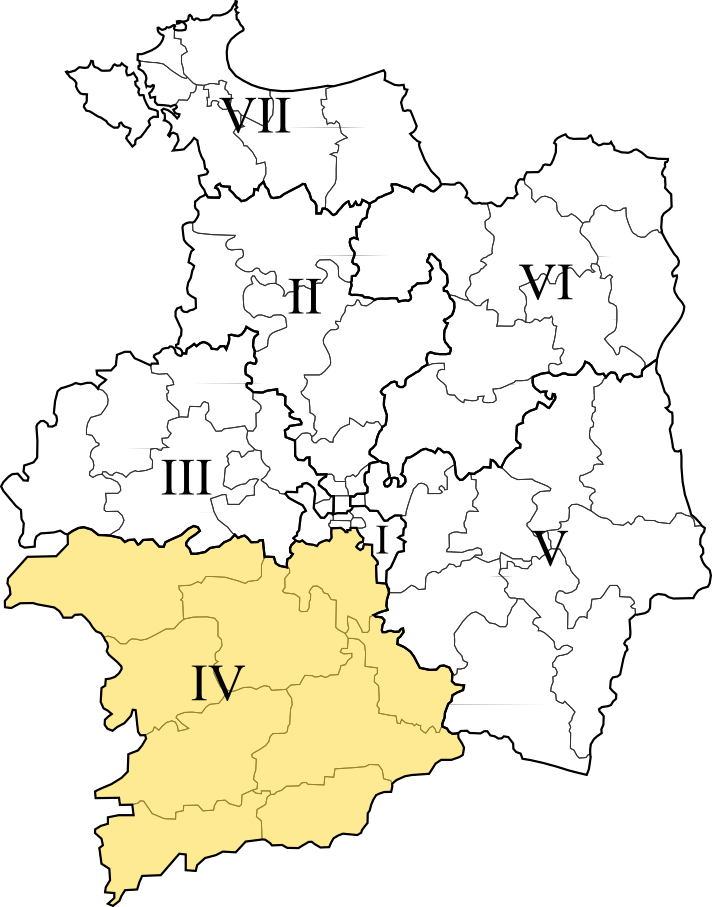
- Constituency in department

- Ille-et-Vilaine in France
- Deputy: Mathilde Hignet; LFI
- Department: Ille-et-Vilaine
- Cantons: (pre-2015) Bain-de-Bretagne, Bruz, Grand-Fougeray, Guichen, Maure-de-Bretagne, Plélan-le-Grand, Pipriac, Redon, Le Sel-de-Bretagne

The 4th constituency of Ille-et-Vilaine is a French legislative constituency in the Ille-et-Vilaine département. Like the other 576 French constituencies, it elects one MP using the two-round system, with a run-off if no candidate receives over 50% of the vote in the first round.

== Description ==
Ille-et-Vilaine's 4th Constituency covers the south west of the department and includes one of its subprefectures, Redon.

The constituency was first established in 1958. During the legislative election of that year, Isidore Renouard, the general councillor for the canton of Redon and mayor of the small town of Langon, was elected. He faced a Henri Dorgères, an agrarian politician with a pro Vichy past elected in 1956 as a Poujadist. Renouard, a centre-right politician, joined the Valéry Giscard d'Estaing-led Independent Republicans in 1962. Reelected in 1962, 1967, 1968 and 1973, he died in 1975 in a car crash. His substitute, Édouard Simon, took his position until the 1978 elections.

In 1978, Alain Madelin is elected. He is reelected in 1981 and in 1985, becomes the general delegate of the Republican Party, the political successor to the Independent Republicans within the UDF. The constituency is abolished in 1986 but Madelin is reelected as deputy and becomes a minister under PM Jacques Chirac. The constituency is then reinstated and recontested in 1988, with few changes. Madelin is reelected that year, against the same opponent as in 1981, the socialist Pierre Bourges, Redon mayor. One of his deputies, Jean-René Marsac, is unsuccessful in 1993 and Madelin is soundly reelected. Under prime minister Édouard Balladur, he is appointed Minister of Business and Economic Development. He is replaced as deputy by Jean-Gilles Berthommier, mayor of Saint-Erblon. Several changes occur in 1995 following the presidential election and the victory of Jacques Chirac. Madelin remains a minister, however promoted in May, to minister for Economics and Finance. In June, he is elected mayor of Redon. However, Madelin soon resigns from government in August and goes back to his deputy position in October. Madelin is reelected in 1997 with a reduced margin but becomes the president of the Republican Party. Over the 1997 summer, he rebrands it Liberal Democracy. Madelin is the presidential election candidate for his party in 2002. He only gets 3,91 % of the vote. He is reelected as deputy in 2002, on a thin margin.

In 2007, Madelin retires from politics. Loïc Aubin, the UMP candidate and mayor of Saint-Thurial, is defeated by Jean-René Marsac, Madelin's socialist opponent in 1993. The constituency is slightly reshaped in 2010 and Marsac is widely reelected in 2012.

In 2017, Gaël Le Bohec, an engineer, is the En Marche ! candidate and succeeds Marsac who was retiring, with more than 60% of the vote against the La France insoumise candidate. Le Bohec does not run again in 2022 and Mathilde Hignet is elected during a close contest. Hignet is a La France insoumise supporter and a farmworker from Val d'Anast.

== Deputies ==
Election	Member	Party
1958	Isidore Renouard	Entente Démocratique
1962	Isidore Renouard	RI
1967	Isidore Renouard	RI
1968	Isidore Renouard	RI
1973	Isidore Renouard	RI
1978	Alain Madelin	UDF
1986	Proportional representation - no election by constituency	
1988	Alain Madelin	UDF
1993	Alain Madelin	UDF
1997	Alain Madelin	DL
2002	Alain Madelin	UMP
2007	Jean-René Marsac	PS
2012	Jean-René Marsac	PS
2017	Gaël Le Bohec	LREM
2022	Mathilde Hignet	LFI

== Election results ==
=== 2024 ===
Candidate	Party	Alliance	First round			Second round		
Candidate	Party	Alliance	Votes	%	+/–	Votes	%	+/–
Jacques François	RN		22,275	32.30	+14.81	26,671	42.43	
Mathilde Hignet	LFI	NFP	22,139	32.10	+0.51	36,195	57.57	+7.21
Anne Patault	REN	Ensemble	16,595	24.06	-5.72	withdrew		
Jeremy Gilbert	LR	UDC	6,103	8.85	+0.97			
Sophie Hubert	DLF		985	1.43	-0.12			
Sandra Chirazi	LO		868	1.26	+0.24			
Votes			68,965	100.00			100.00	
Valid votes			68,965	97.23	-0.10	62,866	89.50	
Blank votes			1,420	2.00	+0.16	5,563	7.92	
Null votes			543	0.77	-0.06	1,814	2.58	
Turnout			70,928	72.61	+22.06	70,243	71.89	
Abstentions			26,760	27.39	-22.06	27,468	28.11	
Registered voters			97,688			97,711		
Result			LFI HOLD					

=== 2022 ===
Legislative Election 2022: Ille-et-Vilaine's 4th constituency
Party	Candidate	Votes	%	±%
LFI (NUPÉS)	Mathilde Hignet	15,371	32.61	+2.69
LREM (Ensemble)	Anne Patault	14,035	29.78	-12.24
RN	Gabriel Orain	8,245	17.49	+6.57
LR (UDC)	Jacques Francois	3,715	7.88	−2.61
REC	Mireille Bleivas	1,265	2.68	N/A
DVG	Gil Desmoulin	1,158	2.46	N/A
Others	N/A	3,343	7.09	
Turnout		47,132	50.55	−1.68
2nd round result
LFI (NUPÉS)	Mathilde Hignet	22,856	50.36	+12.11
LREM (Ensemble)	Anne Patault	22,528	49.64	−12.11
Turnout		45,384	50.92	+7.01
LFI gain from LREM				

=== 2017 ===
Candidate	Label	First round		Second round	
Candidate	Label	Votes	%	Votes	%
Gaël Le Bohec	REM	19,421	42.02	22,667	61.75
Marc Martin	FI	6,314	13.66	14,041	38.25
Franck Pichot	PS	5,646	12.22		
Christian Lechevalier	FN	5,049	10.92		
Jean-Marc Carreau	LR	4,847	10.49		
Sarah Trichet-Allaire	ECO	1,869	4.04		
Philippe Bonnin	DVG	932	2.02		
Nelly Rosais	DLF	700	1.51		
Jocelyne Devriendt	ECO	506	1.09		
Sandra Chirazi	EXG	420	0.91		
Maud Callac	DIV	278	0.60		
Élisabeth Drouin	EXD	238	0.51		
Votes		46,220	100.00	36,708	100.00
Valid votes		46,220	97.92	36,708	92.50
Blank votes		713	1.51	2,020	5.09
Null votes		270	0.57	956	2.41
Turnout		47,203	52.23	39,684	43.91
Abstentions		43,180	47.77	50,699	56.09
Registered voters		90,383		90,383	
Source: Ministry of the Interior

=== 2012 ===
2012 legislative election in Ille-Et-Vilaine's 4th constituency
Candidate	Party	First round		Second round	
Candidate	Party	Votes	%	Votes	%
Jean-René Marsac	PS	23,128	47.69%	28,092	62.30%
Dominique Julaud	AC	11,627	23.97%	16,996	37.70%
Christian Ressort	FN	6,394	13.18%		
Michèle Gillet	FG	2,450	5.05%		
Eloïse Cordier	Breizhistance–UDB–EELV	2,161	4.46%		
Véronique Wester-Ouisse	DLR	1,905	3.93%		
Gwennola Ermel	NPA	447	0.92%		
Sandra Chirazi	LO	388	0.80%		
Valid votes		48,500	97.51%	45,088	96.73%
Spoilt and null votes		1,239	2.49%	1,522	3.27%
Votes cast / turnout		49,739	58.45%	46,610	54.78%
Abstentions		35,353	41.55%	38,479	45.22%
Registered voters		85,092	100.00%	85,089	100.00%

=== 2007 ===
Legislative Election 2007: Ille-et-Vilaine's 4th constituency
Party	Candidate	Votes	%	±%
UMP	Loic Aubin	25,357	38.16	+5.38
PS	Jean-René Marsac	21,062	31.70	+3.34
MoDem	Philippe Cantin	7,326	11.02	N/A
LV	Christian Delacroix	2,905	4.37	+0.32
LCR	Gwennola Ermel	1,965	2.96	N/A
FN	Claude Jouault	1,861	2.80	−3.85
Others	N/A	5,974	-	−
Turnout		67,794	61.84	−3.88
2nd round result
PS	Jean-René Marsac	34,983	52.92	+3.54
UMP	Loic Aubin	31,117	47.08	−3.54
Turnout		67,621	61.69	+0.30
PS gain from UMP				

=== 2002 ===
Legislative Election 2002: Ille-et-Vilaine's 4th constituency
Party	Candidate	Votes	%	±%
UMP	Alain Madelin	20,792	32.78	N/A
PS	Monique Pussat-Marsac	17,991	28.36	+3.74
DVD	Olivier Berthommier	10,556	16.64	N/A
FN	Christian Ressort	4,219	6.65	−0.36
LV	Michel Laclercq	2,572	4.05	−0.22
REG	Emile Granville	1,376	2.17	−0.16
LO	Danielle Stenger	1,355	2.14	−1.60
Others	N/A	4,567	-	−
Turnout		64,986	65.72	−3.99
2nd round result
UMP	Alain Madelin	29,567	50.62	N/A
PS	Monique Pussat-Marsac	28,842	49.38	+4.53
Turnout		60,702	61.39	−9.19
UMP gain from PR				

=== 1997 ===
Legislative Election 1997: Ille-et-Vilaine's 4th constituency
Party	Candidate	Votes	%	±%
PR (UDF)	Alain Madelin	27,281	46.80	-11.79
PS	Simone Bourges	14,355	24.62	+9.38
FN	Hubert Langlois	4,084	7.01	−0.52
PCF	Jean-Louis Frostin	2,999	5.14	−0.13
LV	Jean Hervé	2,490	4.27	N/A
LO	Danielle Stenger	2,180	3.74	N/A
REG	Emile Granville	1,359	2.33	N/A
GE	Paul Renaud	1,285	2.20	−7.21
Others	N/A	2,265	-	−
Turnout		61,073	69.71	−1.78
2nd round result
PR (UDF)	Alain Madelin	32,659	55.15	N/A
PS	Simone Bourges	26,564	44.85	N/A
Turnout		61,824	70.58	N/A
PR hold				

=== 1993 ===
Legislative Election 1993: Ille-et-Vilaine's 4th constituency
Party	Candidate	Votes	%	±%
UDF	Alain Madelin	33,538	58.59	
PS	Jean-René Marsac	8,722	15.24	
GE	Philippe Violanti	5,388	9.41	
FN	Thierry Benoist	4,310	7.53	
PCF	Andre Cheriaux	3,015	5.27	
DIV	Thierry Strube	1,856	3.24	
DIV	Philippe Corbin	415	0.72	
Turnout		60,239	71.49	
UDF hold				

== Sources ==
- INSEE's slip of this constituency: "Tableaux et Analyses de la quatrième circonscrition d'Ille-et-Vilaine" (PDF) (in French).
- List of Ille-et-Vilaine's deputies from 1789: "Tous les députés du département d'Ille-et-Vilaine depuis 1789" (in French). Archived from the original on 30 September 2007.
- Official results of French elections from 1998: "Résultats électoraux officiels en France" (in French). Archived from the original on 20 December 2011.
