= Du Bouëxic family =

Family of the French nobility

du Bouëxic family
- Noble family
- D’argent à trois pins arrachés de sinople, posés deux et un.
- Country: France
- Current region: Brittany
- Founder: Mathurin du Bouëxic
- Motto: Hoc Tegmine Tutus.

The du Bouëxic family is a French noble family, originating from Brittany in France. There are three branches: de Pinieux, de La Driennais and de Guichen, all of which are still represented.

It became famous with Luc Urbain du Bouëxic de Guichen, lieutenant general of the naval armies, grand croix of Saint Louis, knight of the Order of the Holy Spirit and commander of the Navy in Brest, and Charles Auguste du Bouëxic de Pinieux, deputy of Eure-et-Loir.

== History ==
The du Bouëxic family originated from Brittany, where it owned the land of La Chapelle-Bouëxic, from which it takes its name.

Its cradle is the Baron manor house in Lohéac, which it owned in the 16th century.

Its lineage goes back to Mathurin du Bouëxic, who lived in the 16th century.

Guillaume, seigneur of La Driennais, was confirmed as a noble in Brittany on 29 January 1635. Louis de Bouëxic, seigneur of La Chapelle-Bouëxic, was maintained noble in Brittany on 10 November 1668.

Arnaud Clément writes in La noblesse française that the du Bouëxic family obtained letters patent confirming their nobility in 1626, and that they were maintained as nobles in 1668.

== Family's line of descent ==
Below, a simplified family tree.

- Mathurin du Bouëxic, married Charlotte Le Voyer.
  - Gilles du Bouëxic, married around 1560 with Alliette Persaye
    - Louis du Bouëxic, criminal judge of Rennes, married Jeanne Liard
      - Claude du Bouëxic (1590-1658), Councillor in the Parliament of Brittany, married in 1622 to Marie Peschart (1605-1648)
        - Louis du Bouëxic (1623-1678), Councillor in the Parliament of Brittany, married in 1650 to Marie Cybouault († 1678)
          - Louis du Bouëxic (1654- ?), member of the Parlement de Bretagne, married in 1683 to Suzanne Grout de la Corderie (1665-1732)
            - Yves Mathurin du Bouëxic (1685-1716), page in the King's Little Stable.
            - Bernard Louis du Bouëxic (1694-1751), Councillor in the Parliament of Brittany, married in 1728 to Constance de Guersans (1705-1778)
              - Joseph Augustin du Bouëxic de Pinieux (1741-1799), captain in the King's Regiment, married in 1777 to Nicole Pélagie Chastel (1761-1807)
                - fr:Charles Auguste du Bouëxic de Pinieux (1779-1851), Member of Parliament for Eure-et-Loir, married in 1808 to Constance Tourteau de Septeuil (1791-1865)
                  - Jean du Bouëxic de Pinieux (1812-1854), married in 1839 to Marie Tardif d'Hamonville (1820-1859), surviving descendants
      - François du Bouëxic, married Marguerite Fabroni, whose descendants are extinct
      - Jean Louis du Bouëxic, whose descendants are extinct
    - Jean du Bouëxic, Gentleman Ordinary of the King's Chamber, married in 1588 to Françoise Carcaret
      - Jean du Bouëxic († 1671), Attorney General and Syndic of the States of Brittany
      - Guillaume du Bouëxic (1598-1661), Gentleman Ordinary of the King's Chamber, married in 1624 to Gillette Aulnette (1606- ?)
        - Julien du Bouëxic (1624-1679), married in 1649 to Renée Trampé, of which the du Bouëxic de La Driennais branch survives
        - Luc du Bouëxic (1631-1699), lieutenant general of the Maréchaussée de Bretagne, married in 1663 to Marie Blohio (1640-ap. 1707)
          - Luc Louis François du Bouëxic (1668-1735), captain in the Béarn regiment and commissioner to the States of Brittany, married in 1707 to Julienne Thérèse de La Jaille (ca. 1687-1769)
            - Luc Urbain du Bouëxic de Guichen (1712-1790), lieutenant general of the naval armies, married in 1751 to Jeanne Félicité de Rollon (1727-1767), whose descendants are extinct
            - François Félix du Bouëxic (1714-1775), captain in the regiment of La Tour du Pin-infanterie, knight of Saint Louis, married in 1756 to Thérèse-Jeanne de Kerret († ap. 1780)
              - Agathon Luc François du Bouëxic de Guichen (1758-1832), lieutenant, married in 1785 to Lucie Françoise Calloët de Trégomar (1761- ?), of which descendants remain

== Notable family members ==
- Luc Urbain du Bouëxic de Guichen (1712-1790), lieutenant general of the naval armies, grand croix of Saint-Louis, knight of the Order of the Holy Spirit and commander of the navy in Brest.
- fr:Charles Auguste du Bouëxic de Pinieux (1779-1851), deputy of Eure-et-Loir from 1824 to 1830.
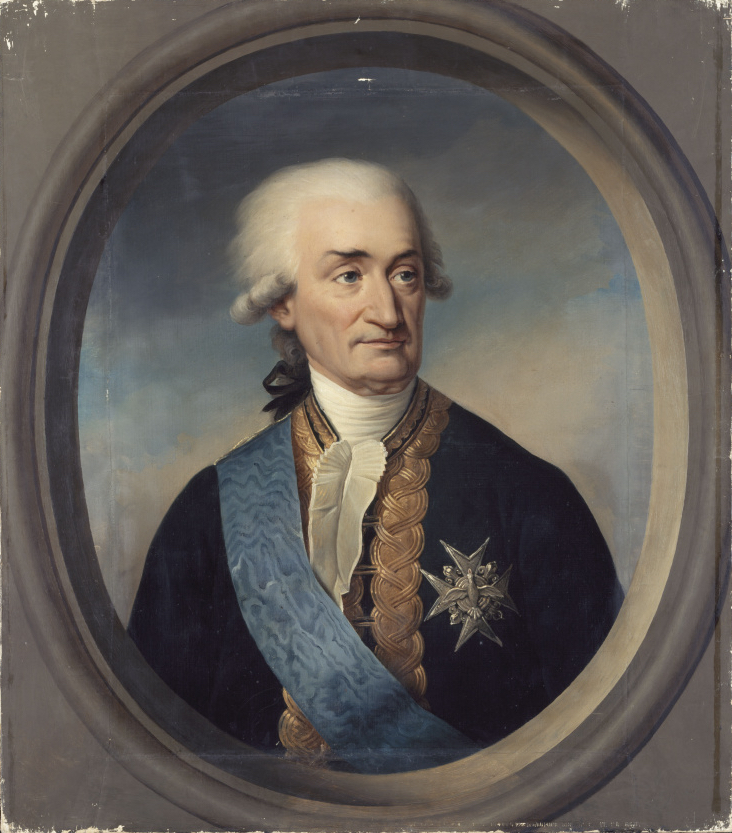
Posthumous portrait of Luc Urbain du Bouëxic de Guichen (1712-1790), oil painting by Paulin Guérin, 1837.
