= Campel =

Campel Caunpèu (Gallo) Kempel (Breton)
- Part of Val d'Anast
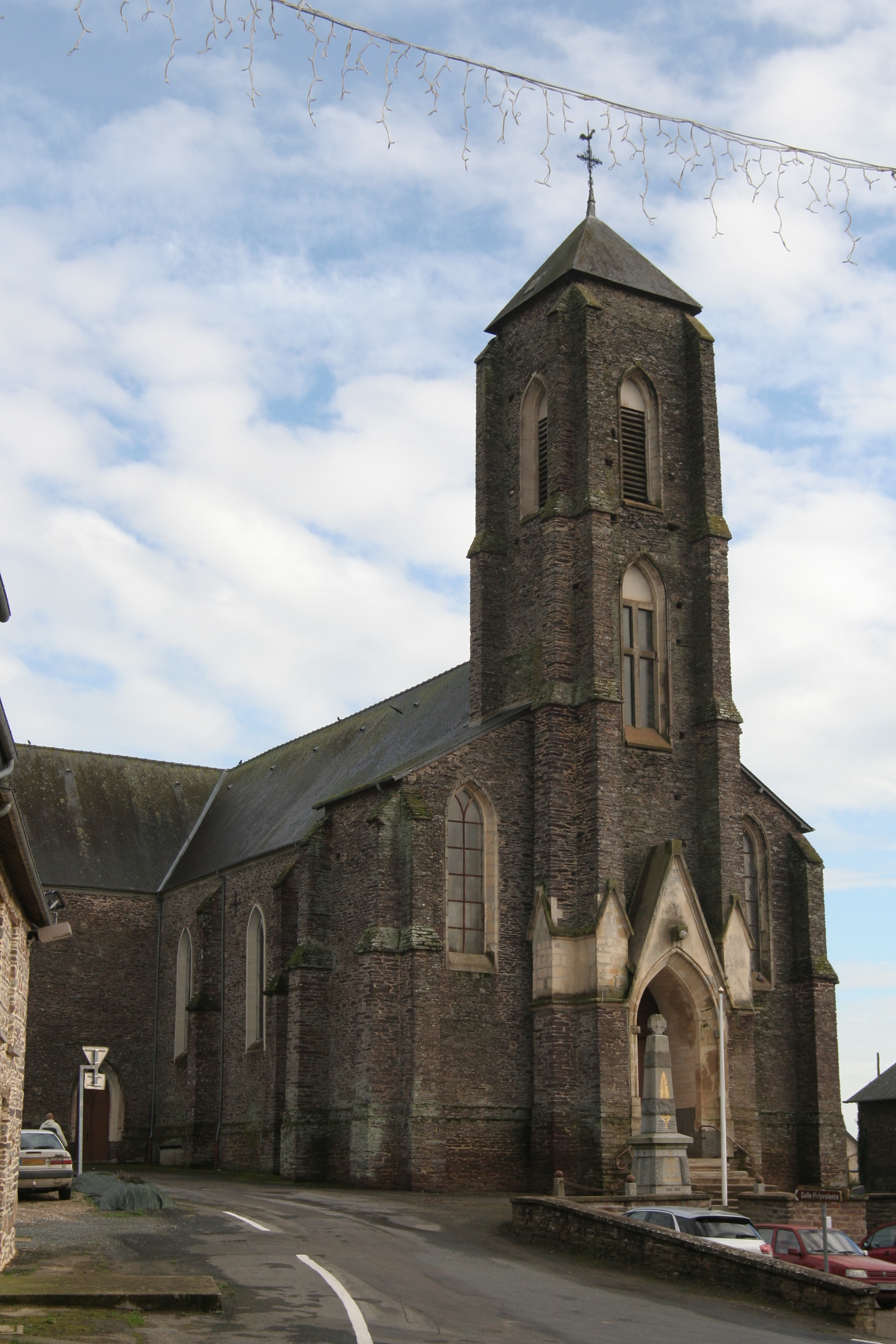
- The church of Sainte-Marie-Madeleine
- Location of Campel
- Location within France Location within Brittany
- Coordinates: 47°56′14″N 2°00′31″W
- Country: France
- Region: Brittany
- Department: Ille-et-Vilaine
- Arrondissement: Redon
- Canton: Guichen
- Commune: Val d'Anast
- Area^{1}: 11.10 km^{2} (4.29 sq mi)
- Highest elevation: 119 m (390 ft)
- Lowest elevation: 47 m (154 ft)
- Population (2023): 455
  - Density: 41.0/km^{2} (106/sq mi)
- Time zone: UTC+01:00 (CET)
  - Summer (DST): UTC+02:00 (CEST)
- Postal code: 35330
- ^{1} French Land Register data, which excludes lakes, ponds, glaciers > 1 km^{2} (0.386 sq mi or 247 acres) and river estuaries.

Campel (French pronunciation: [kɑ̃pɛl]; Breton: Kempel; Gallo: Caunpèu) is a former commune in the Ille-et-Vilaine department in Brittany in northwestern France. On 1 January 2017, it was merged into the new commune Val d'Anast. Inhabitants of Campel are called Campellois in French.

== See also ==
- Communes of the Ille-et-Vilaine department
