= Jean-René Marsac =

French politician

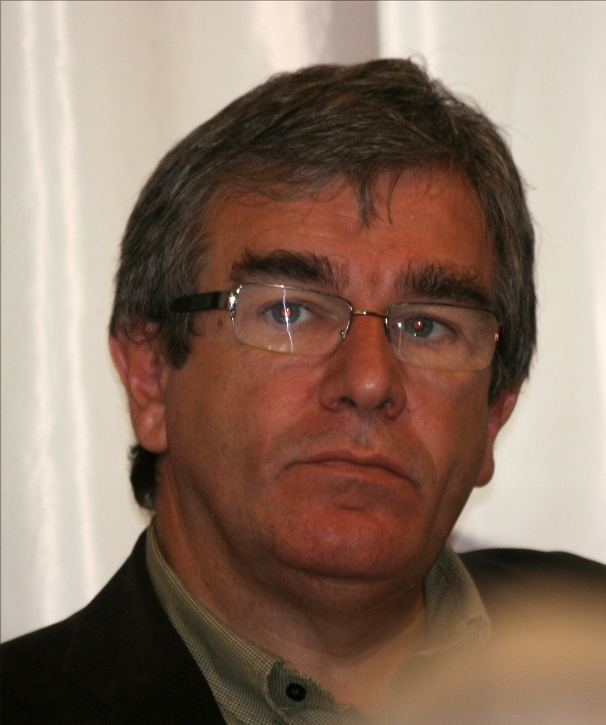
- Jean-rene-marsac

Deputy for Ille-et-Vilaine's 4th constituency in the National Assembly of France
- In office 2007–2017
- Preceded by: Alain Madelin
- Succeeded by: Gaël Le Bohec

Personal details
- Born: 21 April 1954 (age 71) Béganne

Jean-René Marsac (born 21 April 1954 in Béganne) was a member of the National Assembly of France. He represented Ille-et-Vilaine's 4th constituency from 2007 to 2017, as a member of the Socialiste, radical, citoyen et divers gauche.
