= Baulon =

Baulon Baulon (Gallo) Beloen (Breton)
- Commune
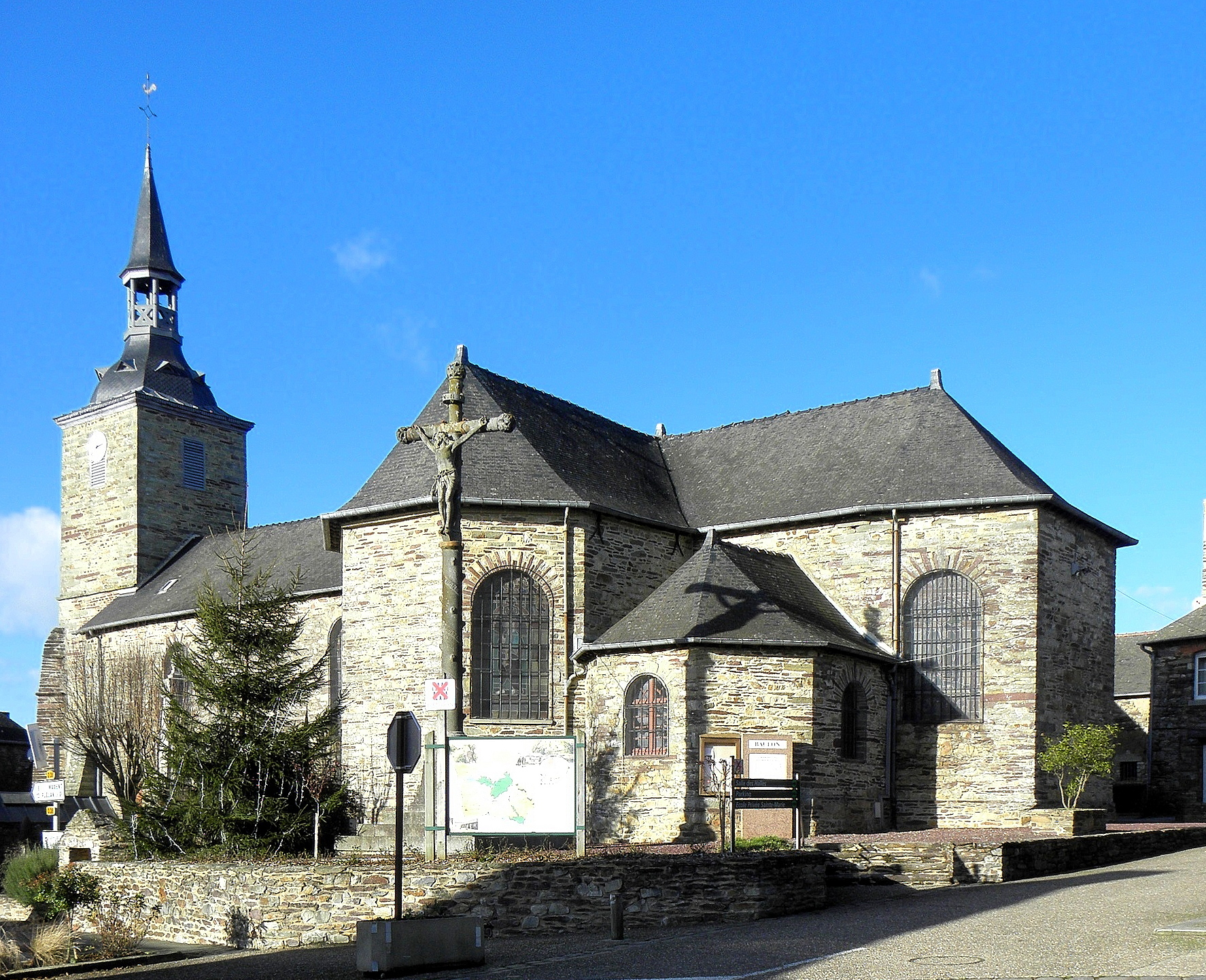
- The church of Baulon

- Coat of arms
- Location of Baulon
- Location within France Location within Brittany
- Coordinates: 47°59′10″N 1°55′50″W
- Country: France
- Region: Brittany
- Department: Ille-et-Vilaine
- Arrondissement: Redon
- Canton: Guichen
- Intercommunality: Vallons de Haute-Bretagne

Government
  - Mayor (2020–2026): Christophe Véron
- Area^{1}: 25.02 km^{2} (9.66 sq mi)
- Highest elevation: 124 m (407 ft)
- Lowest elevation: 48 m (157 ft)
- Population (2023): 2,210
  - Density: 88.3/km^{2} (229/sq mi)
- Time zone: UTC+01:00 (CET)
  - Summer (DST): UTC+02:00 (CEST)
- INSEE/Postal code: 35016 /35580
- ^{1} French Land Register data, which excludes lakes, ponds, glaciers > 1 km^{2} (0.386 sq mi or 247 acres) and river estuaries.

Baulon (French pronunciation: [bolɔ̃]; Breton: Beloen; Gallo: Baulon) is a commune in the Ille-et-Vilaine department in Brittany in northwestern France.

== History ==
Stone axes found in various locations in Baulon - Crambert, Métairies, Champs-du-Four, and Boutard - suggest that the area was inhabited from the Neolithic period.

In the first centuries AD, the Romans occupied Brittany and established a camp in Baulon, in Châtellier, close to the road running from Rennes to Vannes.

After the fall of the Roman Empire in the west, the Bretons, chased out of Great Britain by the Anglo-Saxons, took refuge in Armorica, which became Brittany. In Baulon, they established a monastery. In addition to the monastery, Baulon also possesses another center of worship, which the current market town was built around.

The charter of Anowareth, preserved in the Cartulaire de Redon, indicates that in 869, the noble Roiantdreh adopted as his son and heir Salomon, King of Brittany, putting himself under the latter's protection. This was done in the parish of Baulon in Porhoët.

In the 14th century, the lordship belonged to the lords of Baulon. The coat of arms of Baulon is dated to 1378. The Baulon family ended at the end of the 15th century, succeeded by the Brullon family.

The Brullons built markets and organized fairs from 1574. In 1584, Pierre Brullon received from King Henry III of France the right to render justice in the lordship of the Musse. He built "la maison de la geôle" that served as a court of justice and prison.

In the 18th century, three important fairs were held in Baulon: February 4 for the Feast of Saint Blaise, July 26 for the Feast of Saint Anne, and September 14 for the Feast of the Cross.

The inhabitants of the town supported the changes brought by the French Revolution, especially after the end of the Reign of Terror. The main revolutionary holiday, celebrated from 1795, was one celebrating the anniversary of the execution of Louis XVI, which was accompanied by an oath of hatred to royalty and anarchy. Baulon also celebrated the creation of the Republic.

== Population ==
Historical population
Year	Pop.	±% p.a.
1968	893	—
1975	867	−0.42%
1982	907	+0.65%
1990	1,132	+2.81%
1999	1,324	+1.76%
2007	1,843	+4.22%
2012	2,046	+2.11%
2017	2,160	+1.09%
2023	2,210	+0.38%
Source: INSEE

== See also ==
- Communes of the Ille-et-Vilaine department
