= Mernel =

Mernel Merenèu (Gallo) Merenell (Breton)
- Commune
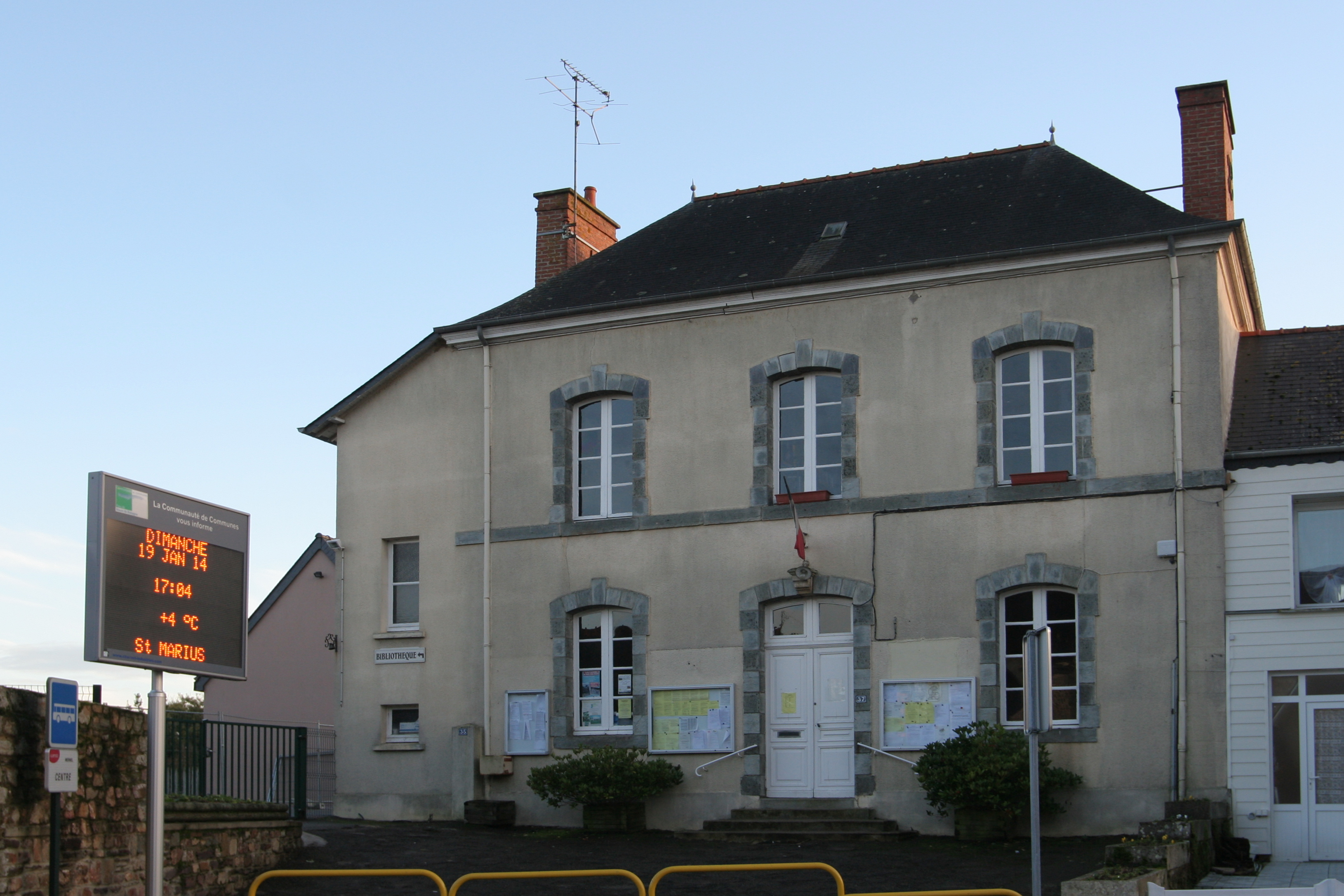
- The town hall of Mernel

- Coat of arms
- Location of Mernel
- Location within France Location within Brittany
- Coordinates: 47°53′55″N 1°57′58″W
- Country: France
- Region: Brittany
- Department: Ille-et-Vilaine
- Arrondissement: Redon
- Canton: Guichen

Government
  - Mayor (2020–2026): Jean-Yves Inizan
- Area^{1}: 17.37 km^{2} (6.71 sq mi)
- Highest elevation: 103 m (338 ft)
- Lowest elevation: 23 m (75 ft)
- Population (2023): 1,021
  - Density: 58.78/km^{2} (152.2/sq mi)
- Time zone: UTC+01:00 (CET)
  - Summer (DST): UTC+02:00 (CEST)
- INSEE/Postal code: 35175 /35330
- ^{1} French Land Register data, which excludes lakes, ponds, glaciers > 1 km^{2} (0.386 sq mi or 247 acres) and river estuaries.

Mernel (French pronunciation: [mɛʁnɛl]; Breton: Merenell; Gallo: Merenèu) is a commune in the Ille-et-Vilaine department of Brittany in northwestern France.

== Population ==
Inhabitants of Mernel are called Mernellois in French.

Historical population
Year	Pop.	±% p.a.
1968	639	—
1975	636	−0.07%
1982	727	+1.93%
1990	702	−0.44%
1999	754	+0.80%
2007	952	+2.96%
2012	1,020	+1.39%
2017	1,034	+0.27%
2023	1,021	−0.21%
Source: INSEE

== See also ==
- Communes of the Ille-et-Vilaine department
