= Alain Madelin =

French politician (born 1946)

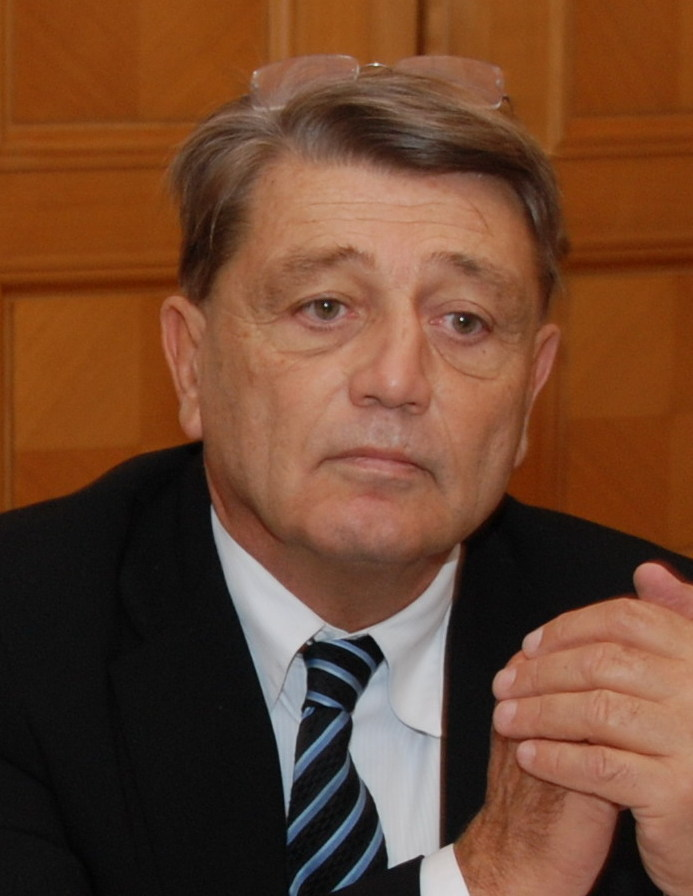
- Alain Madelin in 2009

Minister of the Economy and Finance
- In office 18 May 1995 – 26 August 1995
- President: Jacques Chirac
- Prime Minister: Alain Juppé
- Preceded by: Edmond Alphandéry
- Succeeded by: Jean Arthuis

Mayor of Redon
- In office 25 June 1995 – 18 March 2001
- Preceded by: Pierre Bourges
- Succeeded by: Jean-Michel Bollé

Deputy of Ille-et-Vilaine's 4th constituency
- In office 8 October 1995 – 19 June 2007
- Preceded by: Jean-Gilles Berthommier
- Succeeded by: Jean-René Marsac

Personal details
- Born: 26 March 1946 (age 80) Paris, France
- Party: Independent Republicans (1968–1977); Republican Party (1977–1997); Liberal Democracy (1997–2002); UMP (2002–2007)
- Education: University of Paris 2 Panthéon-Assas

Alain Madelin (French pronunciation: [alɛ̃ madlɛ̃]; born 26 March 1946) is a French politician.

== Politician ==
Madelin was minister of Industry in Prime Minister Jacques Chirac's cabinet from 1986 to 1988, a minister of Business in Prime Minister Édouard Balladur's cabinet from 1993 to 1995, and a minister of Economy and Finances in Prime Minister Alain Juppé's cabinet. He resigned after only three months, citing economic policy differences with Alain Juppé.

He was a member of the National Assembly from 1978 to 2007 as representative for Ille-et-Vilaine's fourth constituency. The district includes the town of Redon, where he was mayor from 1995 until 2000.

Madelin unsuccessfully ran in 1996 for president of the Union for French Democracy (UDF), and was defeated by François Léotard. He was elected as leader of the Parti Républicain, a part of the UDF coalition, which he renamed Démocratie Libérale. In 1998, Démocratie Libérale split from the UDF. Madelin's obtained slightly less than 4% of the vote in the 2002 presidential election and merged his party into the UMP. After 2002, although his former supporter Jean-Pierre Raffarin became Prime minister, and as a result of the end of Démocratie Libérale, Madelin's influence in French national politics dwindled.

As a classical liberal, he was a strong supporter of laissez-faire economics and was also a candidate in the 2002 French presidential election as the leader of the Liberal Democracy party, where he scored 3.91% on the first round. Following the election, he became a member of the Union for a Popular Movement (UMP).

Madelin is the French major politician the most in favor of the international policies of the United States, and supported the United States-led 2003 invasion of Iraq. Because of this, he has, in the past, generally been considered with favor by the US press.

He did not seek reelection in the 2007 elections, ending his involvement in partisan politics.

== Political career ==
Governmental functions

Minister of Industry and Tourism : 1986–1988.

Minister of Enterprise and Economic Development, small and medium enterprises, Trade and Crafts : 1993–1995.

Minister of Economy and Finance : May–August 1995 (Resignation).

Electoral mandates

European Parliament

Member of European Parliament: June–November 1989 (Resignation) / 1999–2002 (Resignation). Elected in 1989, reelected in 1999.

National Assembly of France

Member of the National Assembly of France for Ille-et-Vilaine : 1978–1986 (Became minister in 1986) / 1988–1993 (Became minister in 1993) / 1995–2007. Elected in 1978, reelected in 1981, 1986, 1988, 1993, 1997, 2002.

Regional Council

Vice-president of the Regional Council of Brittany: 1992–1998.

Regional councillor of Brittany: 1986–1998. Reelected in 1992.

General Council

General councillor of Ille-et-Vilaine: 1994–1995 (Resignation).

Municipal Council

Mayor of Redon: 1995–2001.

Municipal councillor of Redon : 1995–2001.

Political functions

President of Liberal Democracy (France): 1997–2002.

Vice-president of the Union for French Democracy: 1991–1996.

Vice-president of the Republican Party (France): 1986–1997.

"Honorary member" of the Club de l'horloge.

== Books ==
Madelin wrote several books and essays including:

- Freeing Schools (Editions Robert Laffont, 1984)
- My Fellow Countryman (Editions Lattès, 1994)
- When the Ostriches Raised Their Heads (Editions Robert Laffont, 1995)
- The Origins of the French Liberal Model (Editions Plon-Perrin, 1997)
- The Right of the weakest (1999)
- When the ostrich will take their retirement (Editions du Seuil, 2003)
- Should we delete the school map? (Magnard, 2009)
