= Lassy, Ille-et-Vilaine =

Lassy Laczic (Gallo) Lazig (Breton)
- Commune
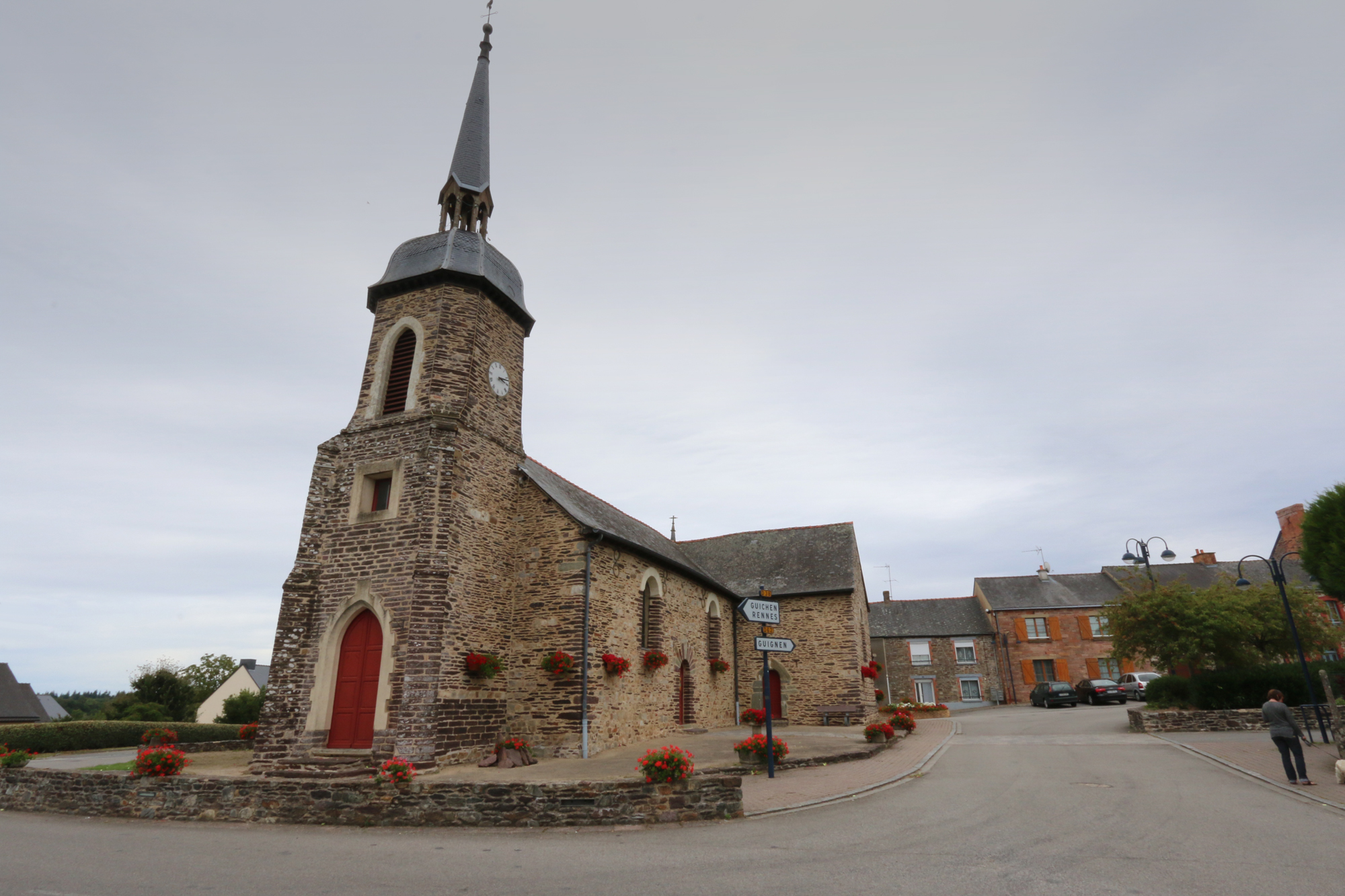
- The parish church of Saint-Martin in Lassy
- Location of Lassy
- Location within France Location within Brittany
- Coordinates: 47°58′47″N 1°52′07″W
- Country: France
- Region: Brittany
- Department: Ille-et-Vilaine
- Arrondissement: Redon
- Canton: Guichen
- Intercommunality: Vallons de Haute-Bretagne

Government
  - Mayor (2020–2026): Didier Le Chénéchal
- Area^{1}: 9.76 km^{2} (3.77 sq mi)
- Highest elevation: 112 m (367 ft)
- Lowest elevation: 37 m (121 ft)
- Population (2023): 1,841
  - Density: 189/km^{2} (489/sq mi)
- Time zone: UTC+01:00 (CET)
  - Summer (DST): UTC+02:00 (CEST)
- INSEE/Postal code: 35149 /35580
- ^{1} French Land Register data, which excludes lakes, ponds, glaciers > 1 km^{2} (0.386 sq mi or 247 acres) and river estuaries.

Lassy (French pronunciation: [lasi]; Breton: Lazig; Gallo: Laczic) is a commune in the Ille-et-Vilaine department of Brittany in northwestern France.

== Population ==
Inhabitants of Lassy are called in French Lasséens.

Historical population
| Year | Pop. | ±% p.a. |
|---|---|---|
| 1968 | 373 | — |
| 1975 | 441 | +2.42% |
| 1982 | 729 | +7.44% |
| 1990 | 911 | +2.83% |
| 1999 | 1,026 | +1.33% |
| 2007 | 1,325 | +3.25% |
| 2012 | 1,445 | +1.75% |
| 2017 | 1,702 | +3.33% |
| 2023 | 1,841 | +1.32% |
Source: INSEE

== See also ==
- Communes of the Ille-et-Vilaine department
