= Goven =

Goven Govaen (Gallo)
- Commune
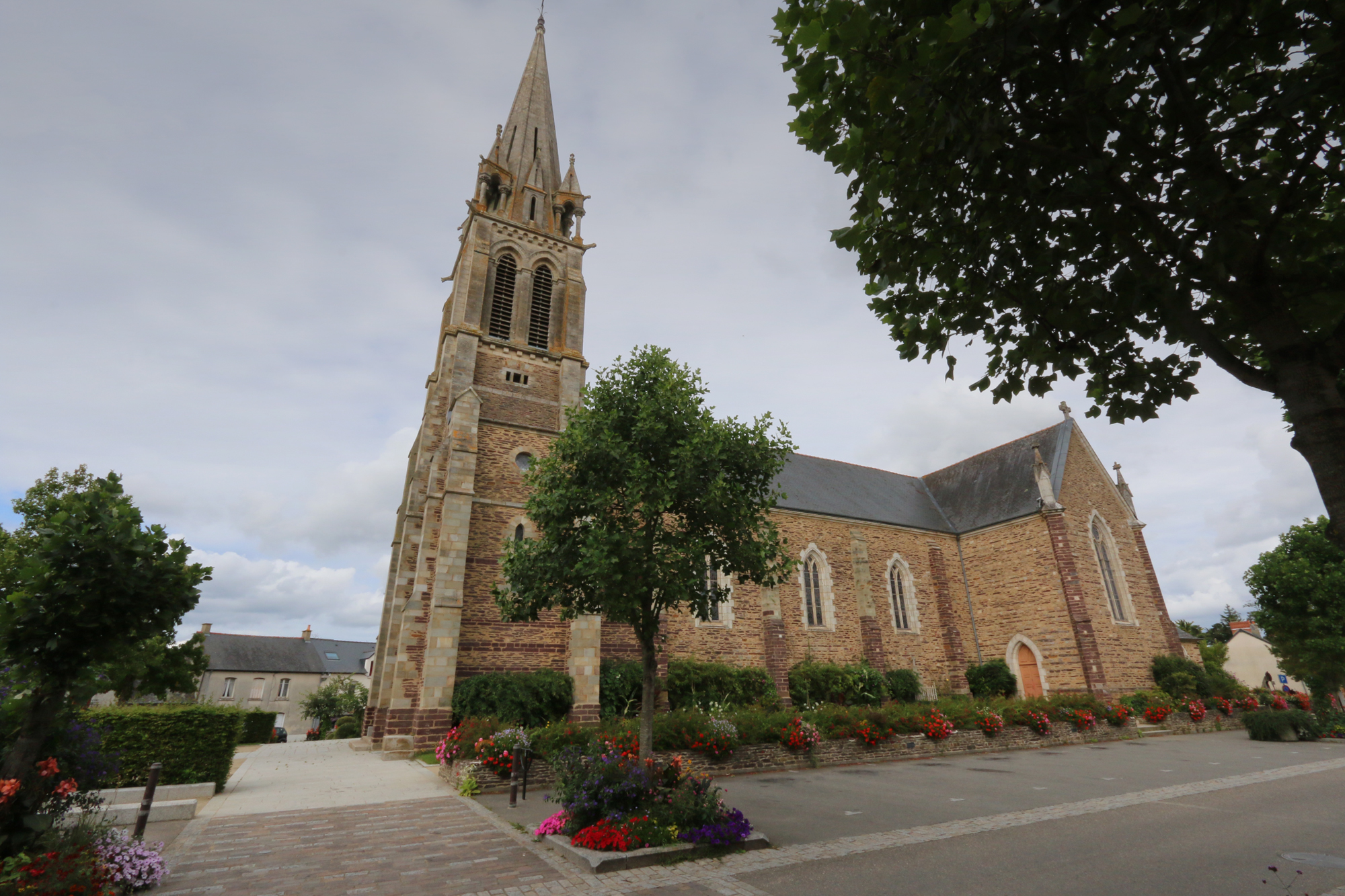
- The church in Goven

- Coat of arms
- Location of Goven
- Location within France Location within Brittany
- Coordinates: 48°00′24″N 1°50′46″W
- Country: France
- Region: Brittany
- Department: Ille-et-Vilaine
- Arrondissement: Redon
- Canton: Guichen
- Intercommunality: Vallons de Haute-Bretagne

Government
  - Mayor (2020–2026): Norbert Saulnier
- Area^{1}: 39.73 km^{2} (15.34 sq mi)
- Highest elevation: 116 m (381 ft)
- Lowest elevation: 15 m (49 ft)
- Population (2023): 4,359
  - Density: 109.7/km^{2} (284.2/sq mi)
- Time zone: UTC+01:00 (CET)
  - Summer (DST): UTC+02:00 (CEST)
- INSEE/Postal code: 35123 /35580
- ^{1} French Land Register data, which excludes lakes, ponds, glaciers > 1 km^{2} (0.386 sq mi or 247 acres) and river estuaries.

Goven (French pronunciation: [ɡɔvɛ̃]; Breton: Goven; Gallo: Govaen) is a commune in the Ille-et-Vilaine department in Brittany in northwestern France.

== Geography ==
The Meu river flows into the Vilaine in the commune.

== Population ==
Inhabitants of Goven are called Govenais in French.

Historical population
Year	Pop.	±% p.a.
1968	1,763	—
1975	2,149	+2.87%
1982	2,270	+0.79%
1990	2,638	+1.90%
1999	2,967	+1.31%
2007	3,788	+3.10%
2012	4,318	+2.65%
2017	4,363	+0.21%
2023	4,359	−0.02%
Source: INSEE

== See also ==
- Communes of the Ille-et-Vilaine department
