= Comblessac =

Comblessac Conbeczac (Gallo) Kamlec'hieg (Breton)
- Commune
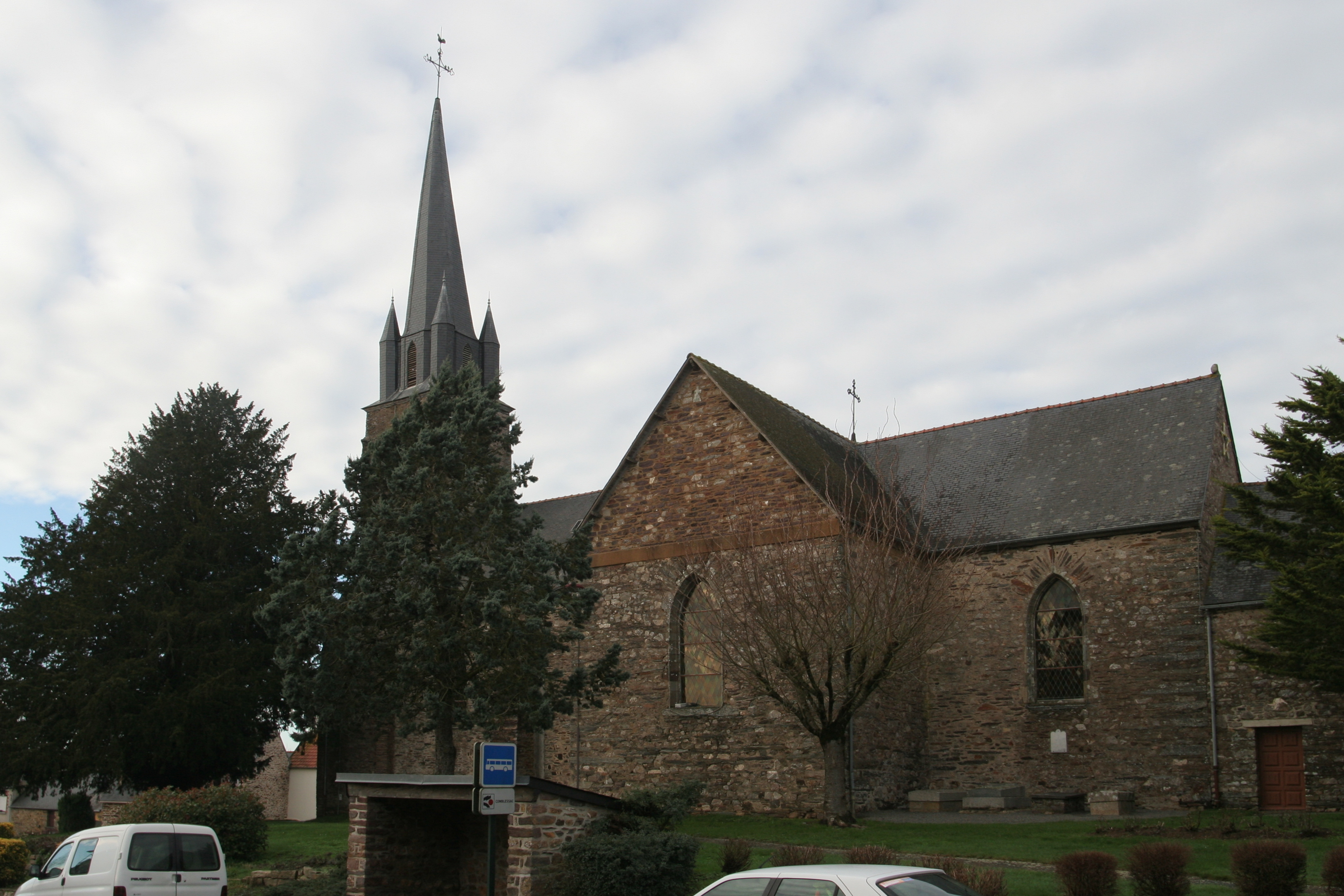
- The church of Saint-Éloi
- Location of Comblessac
- Location within France Location within Brittany
- Coordinates: 47°52′38″N 2°04′58″W
- Country: France
- Region: Brittany
- Department: Ille-et-Vilaine
- Arrondissement: Redon
- Canton: Guichen
- Intercommunality: Vallons de Haute-Bretagne

Government
  - Mayor (2020–2026): Christophe Ricaud
- Area^{1}: 17.23 km^{2} (6.65 sq mi)
- Highest elevation: 96 m (315 ft)
- Lowest elevation: 17 m (56 ft)
- Population (2023): 671
  - Density: 38.9/km^{2} (101/sq mi)
- Time zone: UTC+01:00 (CET)
  - Summer (DST): UTC+02:00 (CEST)
- INSEE/Postal code: 35084 /35330
- ^{1} French Land Register data, which excludes lakes, ponds, glaciers > 1 km^{2} (0.386 sq mi or 247 acres) and river estuaries.

Comblessac (Gallo: Conbeczac, Breton: Kamlec'hieg) is a commune in the Ille-et-Vilaine department of Brittany in northwestern France.

== Population ==
Inhabitants of Comblessac are called Comblessacois in French.

Historical population
Year	Pop.	±% p.a.
1968	581	—
1975	535	−1.17%
1982	489	−1.28%
1990	497	+0.20%
1999	487	−0.23%
2007	611	+2.88%
2012	697	+2.67%
2017	689	−0.23%
2023	671	−0.44%
Source: INSEE

== See also ==
- Communes of the Ille-et-Vilaine department
