= Saint-Senoux =

Saint-Senoux Saent-Senór (Gallo) Sant-Senour (Breton)
- Commune
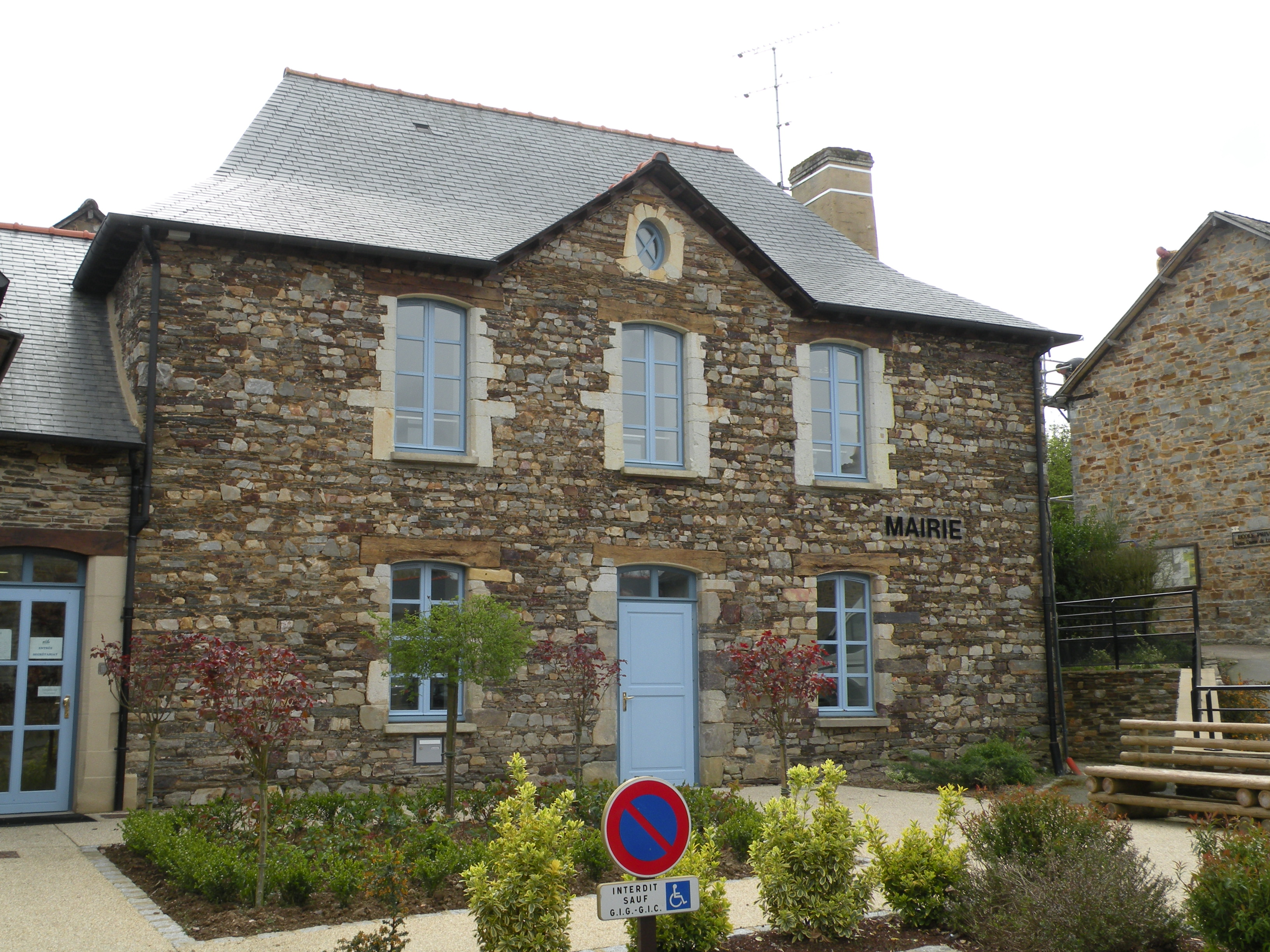
- The town hall of Saint-Senoux
- Location of Saint-Senoux
- Location within France Location within Brittany
- Coordinates: 47°54′24″N 1°47′11″W
- Country: France
- Region: Brittany
- Department: Ille-et-Vilaine
- Arrondissement: Redon
- Canton: Guichen
- Intercommunality: Vallons de Haute-Bretagne

Government
  - Mayor (2023–2026): Maryline Lair
- Area^{1}: 18.29 km^{2} (7.06 sq mi)
- Highest elevation: 111 m (364 ft)
- Lowest elevation: 7 m (23 ft)
- Population (2023): 1,863
  - Density: 101.9/km^{2} (263.8/sq mi)
- Time zone: UTC+01:00 (CET)
  - Summer (DST): UTC+02:00 (CEST)
- INSEE/Postal code: 35312 /35580
- ^{1} French Land Register data, which excludes lakes, ponds, glaciers > 1 km^{2} (0.386 sq mi or 247 acres) and river estuaries.

Saint-Senoux (French pronunciation: [sɛ̃ sənu]; Breton: Sant-Senour; Gallo: Saent-Senór) is a commune in the Ille-et-Vilaine department in Brittany in northwestern France.

== Population ==
Inhabitants of Saint-Senoux are called Sennonais in French.

Historical population
Year	Pop.	±% p.a.
1968	604	—
1975	705	+2.23%
1982	860	+2.88%
1990	927	+0.94%
1999	1,074	+1.65%
2007	1,572	+4.88%
2012	1,749	+2.16%
2017	1,840	+1.02%
2023	1,863	+0.21%
Source: INSEE

== See also ==
- Communes of the Ille-et-Vilaine department
