= Guignen =

Guignen Ginyen (Gallo) Gwinien (Breton)
- Commune
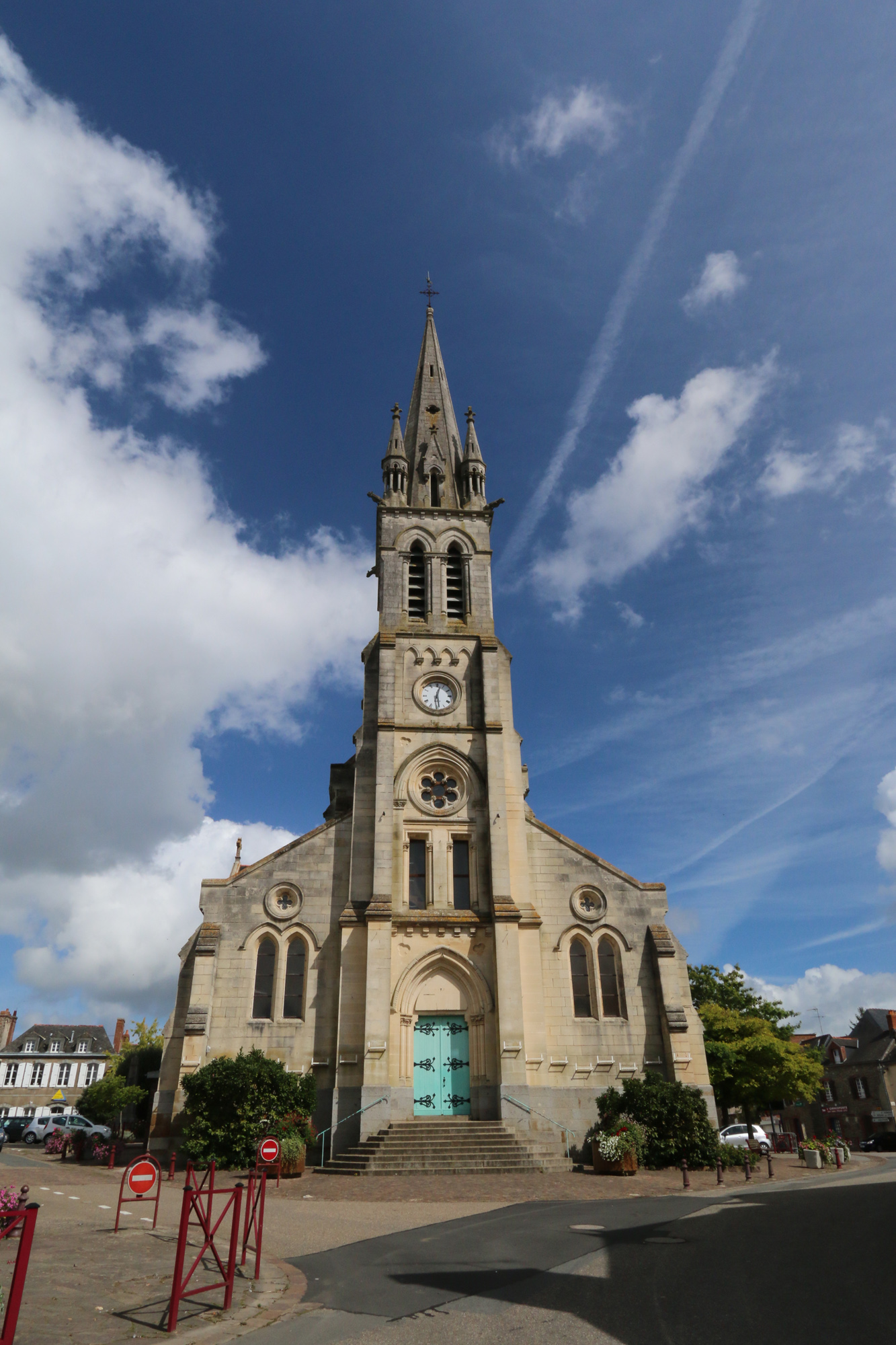
- The church in Guignen

- Coat of arms
- Location of Guignen
- Location within France Location within Brittany
- Coordinates: 47°55′16″N 1°51′38″W
- Country: France
- Region: Brittany
- Department: Ille-et-Vilaine
- Arrondissement: Redon
- Canton: Guichen
- Intercommunality: Vallons de Haute-Bretagne

Government
  - Mayor (2020–2026): Evelyne Lefeuvre
- Area^{1}: 53.05 km^{2} (20.48 sq mi)
- Highest elevation: 122 m (400 ft)
- Lowest elevation: 21 m (69 ft)
- Population (2023): 4,175
  - Density: 78.70/km^{2} (203.8/sq mi)
- Time zone: UTC+01:00 (CET)
  - Summer (DST): UTC+02:00 (CEST)
- INSEE/Postal code: 35127 /35580
- ^{1} French Land Register data, which excludes lakes, ponds, glaciers > 1 km^{2} (0.386 sq mi or 247 acres) and river estuaries.

Guignen (French pronunciation: [ɡiɲɛ̃]; Breton: Gwinien; Gallo: Ginyen) is a commune in the Ille-et-Vilaine department in Brittany in northwestern France.

== Viscounts of Guignen ==
The title of Viscount of Guignen had been the property of the House of Rohan since the 15th century. It was passed through to the Princes of Condé, members of the House of Bourbon by a marriage between Louis Joseph de Bourbon, Prince of Condé to Charlotte de Rohan who was created Viscountess in 1745. At her death in 1760, it became one of the subsidiary titles of the Condé's being confiscated during the revolution.

== Population ==
Inhabitants of Guignen are called Guignennais in French.

Historical population
Year	Pop.	±% p.a.
1968	1,713	—
1975	1,780	+0.55%
1982	1,933	+1.18%
1990	2,146	+1.32%
1999	2,424	+1.36%
2007	3,089	+3.08%
2012	3,551	+2.83%
2017	3,902	+1.90%
2023	4,175	+1.13%
Source: INSEE
