= Maure-de-Bretagne =

Maure-de-Bretagne Anast
- Part of Val d'Anast
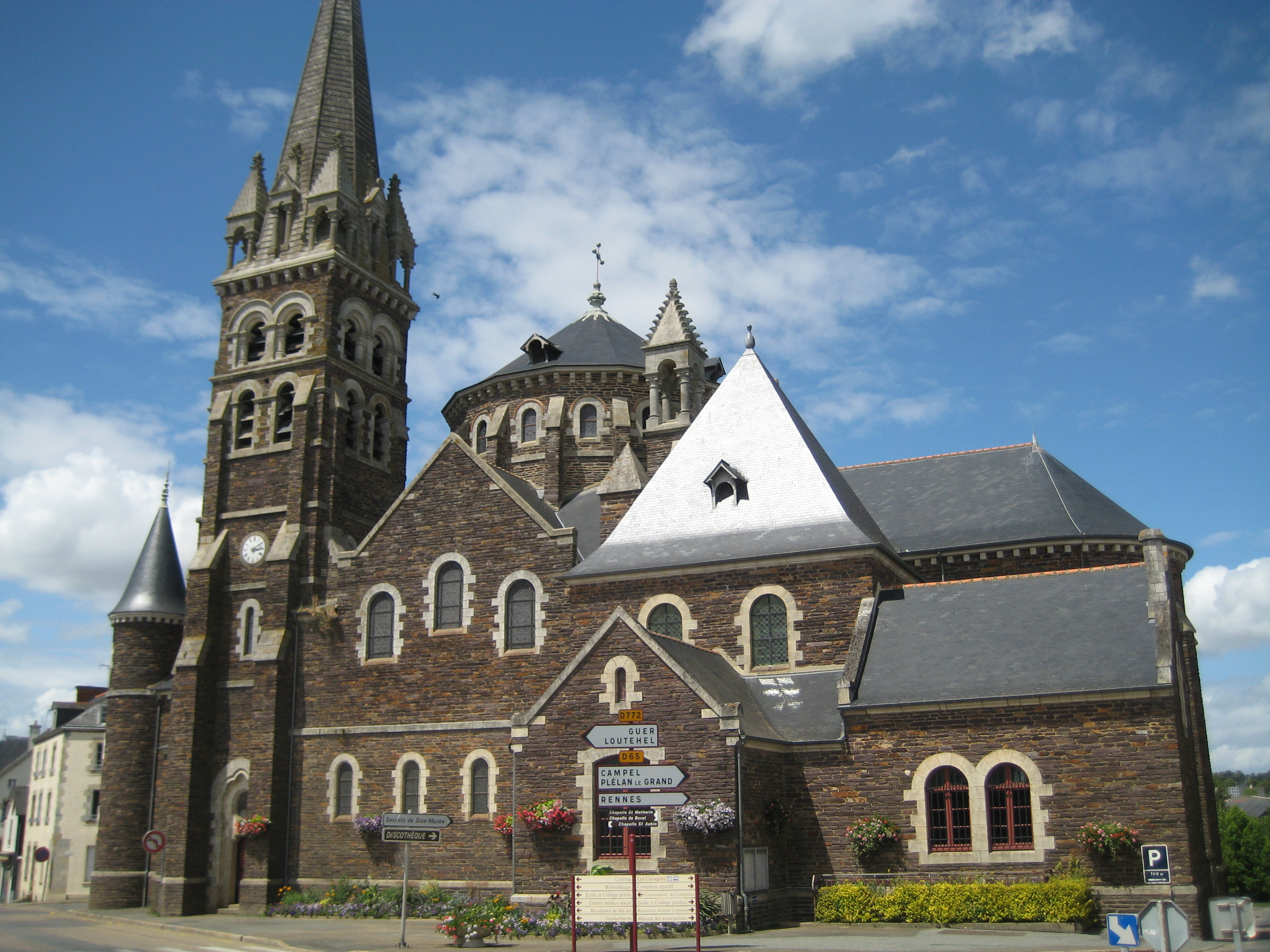
- The church in Maure-de-Bretagne

- Coat of arms
- Location of Maure-de-Bretagne
- Location within France Location within Brittany
- Coordinates: 47°53′30″N 1°59′25″W
- Country: France
- Region: Brittany
- Department: Ille-et-Vilaine
- Arrondissement: Redon
- Canton: Guichen
- Commune: Val d'Anast
- Area^{1}: 66.76 km^{2} (25.78 sq mi)
- Highest elevation: 117 m (384 ft)
- Lowest elevation: 17 m (56 ft)
- Population (2022): 3,471
  - Density: 51.99/km^{2} (134.7/sq mi)
- Time zone: UTC+01:00 (CET)
  - Summer (DST): UTC+02:00 (CEST)
- Postal code: 35330
- ^{1} French Land Register data, which excludes lakes, ponds, glaciers > 1 km^{2} (0.386 sq mi or 247 acres) and river estuaries.

Maure-de-Bretagne (French pronunciation: [mɔʁ də bʁətaɲ], literally Maure of Brittany; Breton: Anast; Gallo: Maurr) is a former commune in the Ille-et-Vilaine department in Brittany in northwestern France. On 1 January 2017, it was merged into the new commune Val d'Anast.

== Population ==
Inhabitants of Maure-de-Bretagne are called Mauritaniens in French.

Historical population
Year	Pop.	±% p.a.
1962	2,800	—
1968	2,646	−0.94%
1975	2,516	−0.72%
1982	2,496	−0.11%
1990	2,552	+0.28%
1999	2,470	−0.36%
2006	2,872	+2.18%
2022	3,471	+1.19%
Source: EHESS and INSEE

== See also ==
- Canton of Maure-de-Bretagne
- Communes of the Ille-et-Vilaine department
