= Loutehel =

Loutehel Loutehel
- Commune
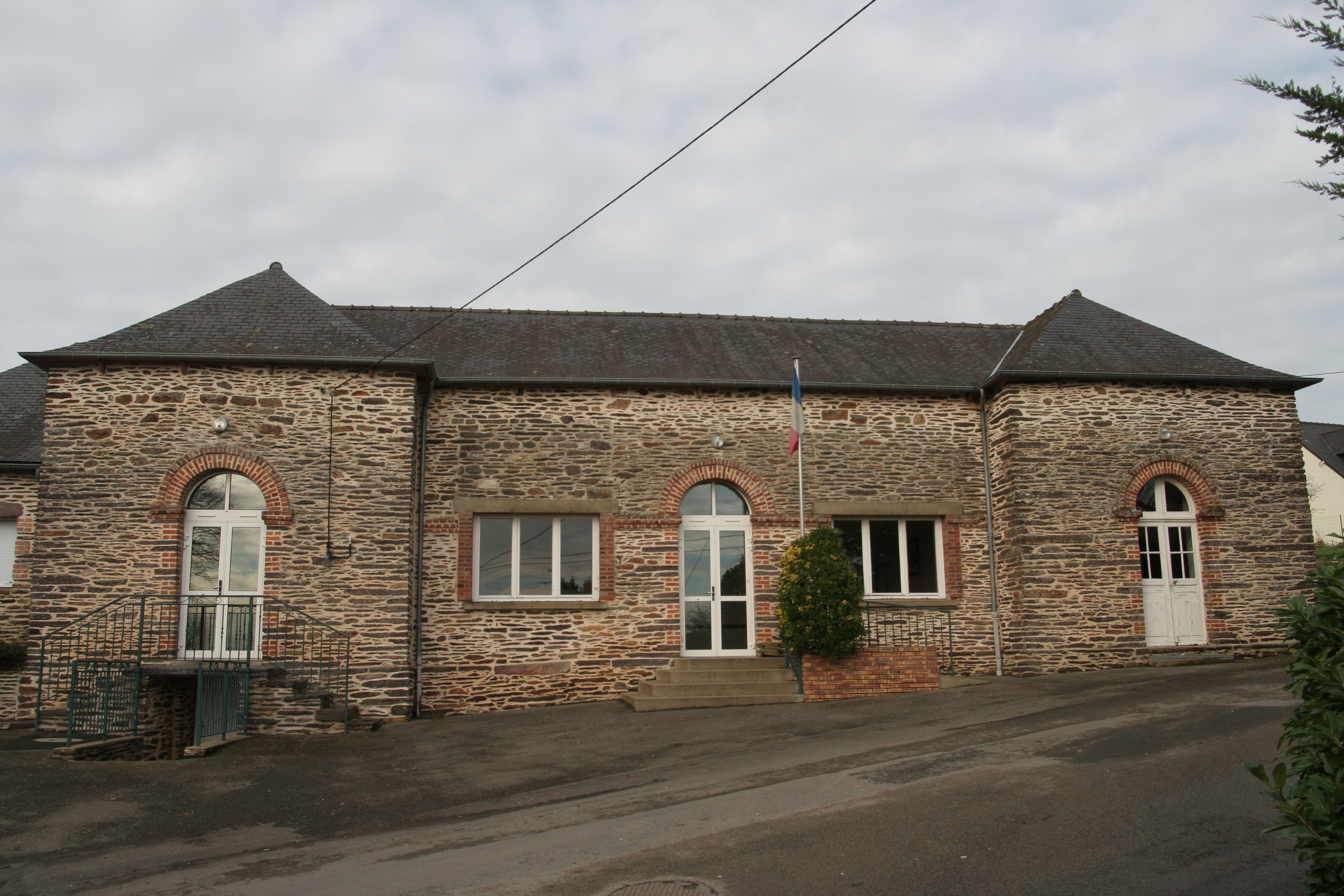
- The town hall in Loutehel
- Location of Loutehel
- Location within France Location within Brittany
- Coordinates: 47°56′13″N 2°04′45″W
- Country: France
- Region: Brittany
- Department: Ille-et-Vilaine
- Arrondissement: Redon
- Canton: Guichen
- Intercommunality: Vallons de Haute-Bretagne

Government
  - Mayor (2020–2026): Pascal Guerro
- Area^{1}: 7.21 km^{2} (2.78 sq mi)
- Highest elevation: 99 m (325 ft)
- Lowest elevation: 31 m (102 ft)
- Population (2023): 243
  - Density: 33.7/km^{2} (87.3/sq mi)
- Time zone: UTC+01:00 (CET)
  - Summer (DST): UTC+02:00 (CEST)
- INSEE/Postal code: 35160 /35330
- ^{1} French Land Register data, which excludes lakes, ponds, glaciers > 1 km^{2} (0.386 sq mi or 247 acres) and river estuaries.

Loutehel (French pronunciation: [lutɛl]; Breton: Loutehel) is a commune in the Ille-et-Vilaine department of Brittany in northwestern France.

== Population ==
Historical population
Year	Pop.	±% p.a.
1968	234	—
1975	197	−2.43%
1982	196	−0.07%
1990	223	+1.63%
1999	191	−1.71%
2007	200	+0.58%
2012	235	+3.28%
2017	258	+1.89%
2023	243	−0.99%
Source: INSEE

== See also ==
- Communes of the Ille-et-Vilaine department
