= Les Brulais =

Les Brulais Lésbroelaè (Gallo) Ar Brugeier (Breton)
- Commune
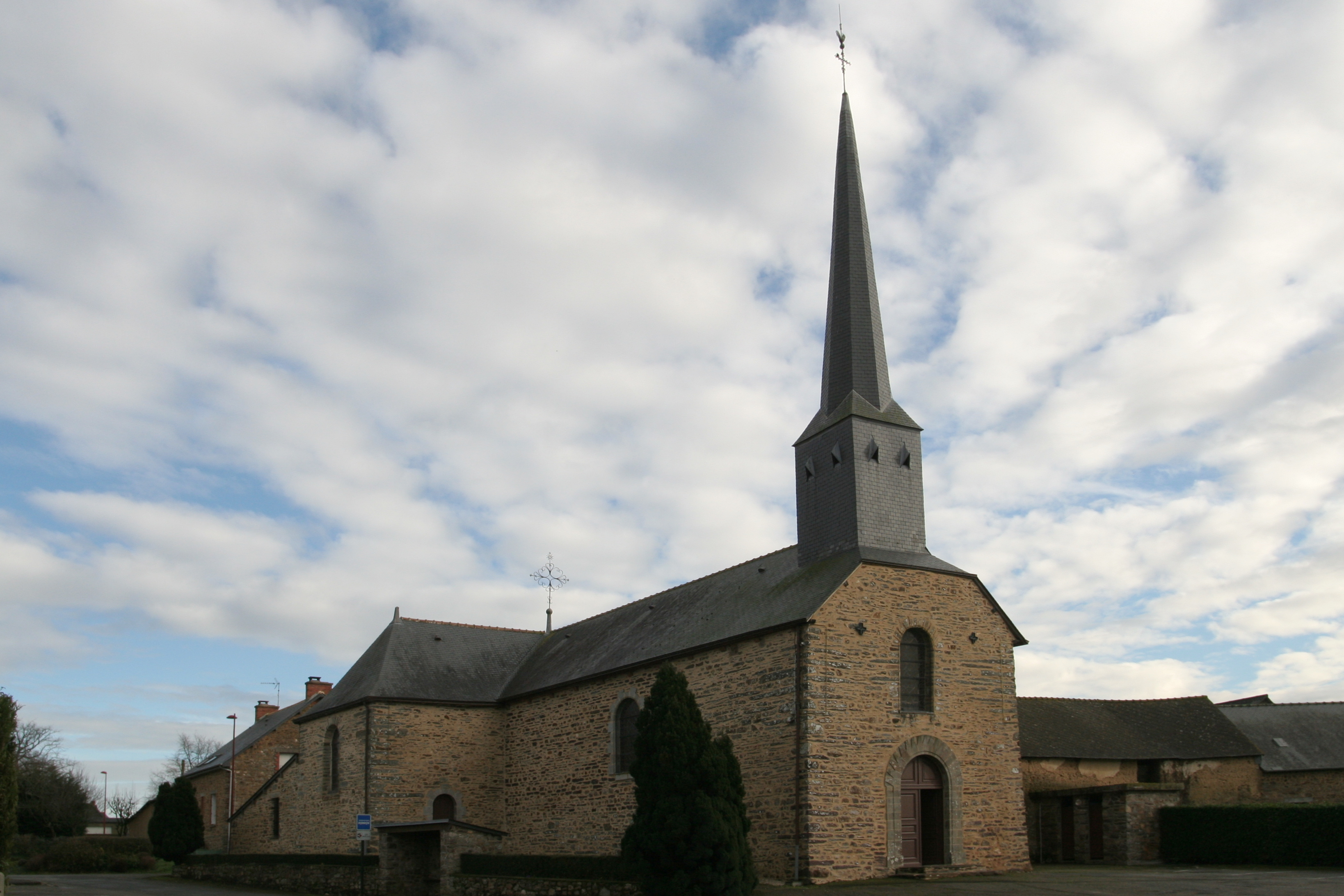
- The church of Les Brulais
- Location of Les Brulais
- Location within France Location within Brittany
- Coordinates: 47°53′23″N 2°02′30″W
- Country: France
- Region: Brittany
- Department: Ille-et-Vilaine
- Arrondissement: Redon
- Canton: Guichen
- Intercommunality: Vallons de Haute-Bretagne

Government
  - Mayor (2020–2026): Hugues Raffegeau
- Area^{1}: 11.96 km^{2} (4.62 sq mi)
- Highest elevation: 91 m (299 ft)
- Lowest elevation: 27 m (89 ft)
- Population (2023): 542
  - Density: 45.3/km^{2} (117/sq mi)
- Time zone: UTC+01:00 (CET)
  - Summer (DST): UTC+02:00 (CEST)
- INSEE/Postal code: 35046 /35330
- ^{1} French Land Register data, which excludes lakes, ponds, glaciers > 1 km^{2} (0.386 sq mi or 247 acres) and river estuaries.

Les Brulais (French pronunciation: [le bʁylɛ]; Gallo: Lésbroelaè, Breton: Ar Brugeier) is a commune in the Ille-et-Vilaine department in Brittany in northwestern France.

== Population ==
Inhabitants of Les Brulais are called Brulaisiens in French.

Historical population
Year	Pop.	±% p.a.
1968	389	—
1975	382	−0.26%
1982	362	−0.77%
1990	387	+0.84%
1999	400	+0.37%
2007	454	+1.60%
2012	477	+0.99%
2017	553	+3.00%
2023	542	−0.33%
Source: INSEE

== See also ==
- Communes of the Ille-et-Vilaine department
