= Guichen =

Guichen Gischen (Gallo) Gwizien (Breton)
- Commune
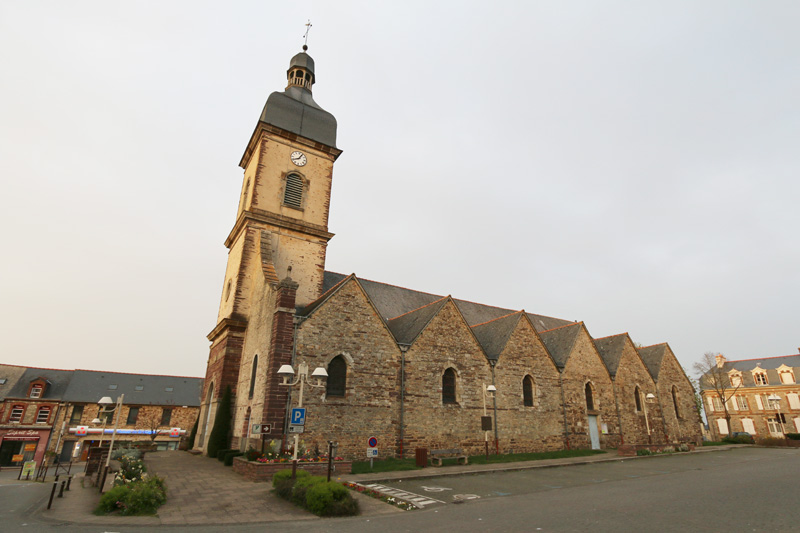
- Church of Guichen

- Coat of arms
- Location of Guichen
- Location within France Location within Brittany
- Coordinates: 47°58′05″N 1°47′38″W
- Country: France
- Region: Brittany
- Department: Ille-et-Vilaine
- Arrondissement: Redon
- Canton: Guichen
- Intercommunality: Vallons de Haute-Bretagne

Government
  - Mayor (2020–2026): Dominique Delamarre
- Area^{1}: 42.99 km^{2} (16.60 sq mi)
- Highest elevation: 107 m (351 ft)
- Lowest elevation: 7 m (23 ft)
- Population (2023): 9,412
  - Density: 218.9/km^{2} (567.0/sq mi)
- Time zone: UTC+01:00 (CET)
  - Summer (DST): UTC+02:00 (CEST)
- INSEE/Postal code: 35126 /35580
- ^{1} French Land Register data, which excludes lakes, ponds, glaciers > 1 km^{2} (0.386 sq mi or 247 acres) and river estuaries.

Guichen (French pronunciation: [ɡiʃɛ̃]; Breton: Gwizien; Gallo: Gischen) is a commune in the Ille-et-Vilaine department in Brittany in northwestern France.

== Population ==
Inhabitants of Guichen are called Guichenais in French.

Historical population
| Year | Pop. | ±% p.a. |
|---|---|---|
| 1968 | 3,311 | — |
| 1975 | 4,431 | +4.25% |
| 1982 | 5,311 | +2.62% |
| 1990 | 5,891 | +1.30% |
| 1999 | 6,526 | +1.14% |
| 2007 | 7,181 | +1.20% |
| 2012 | 7,797 | +1.66% |
| 2017 | 8,568 | +1.90% |
| 2023 | 9,412 | +1.58% |
Source: INSEE

== Image gallery ==
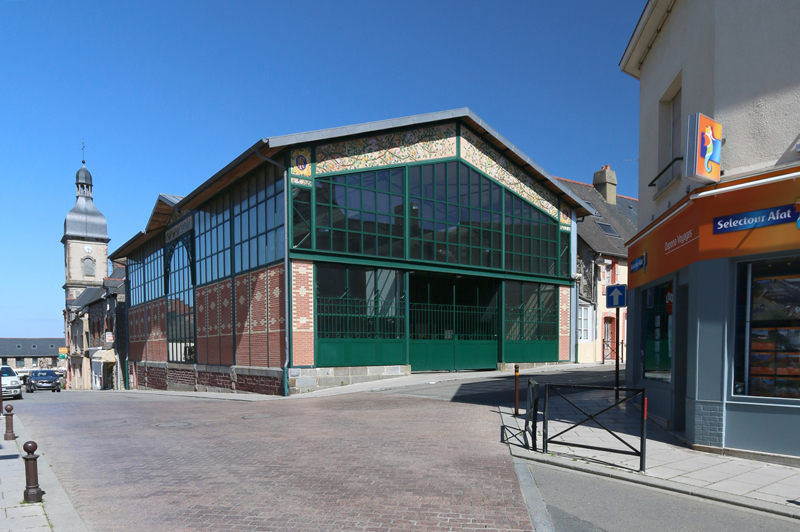
The Halles of Guichen.

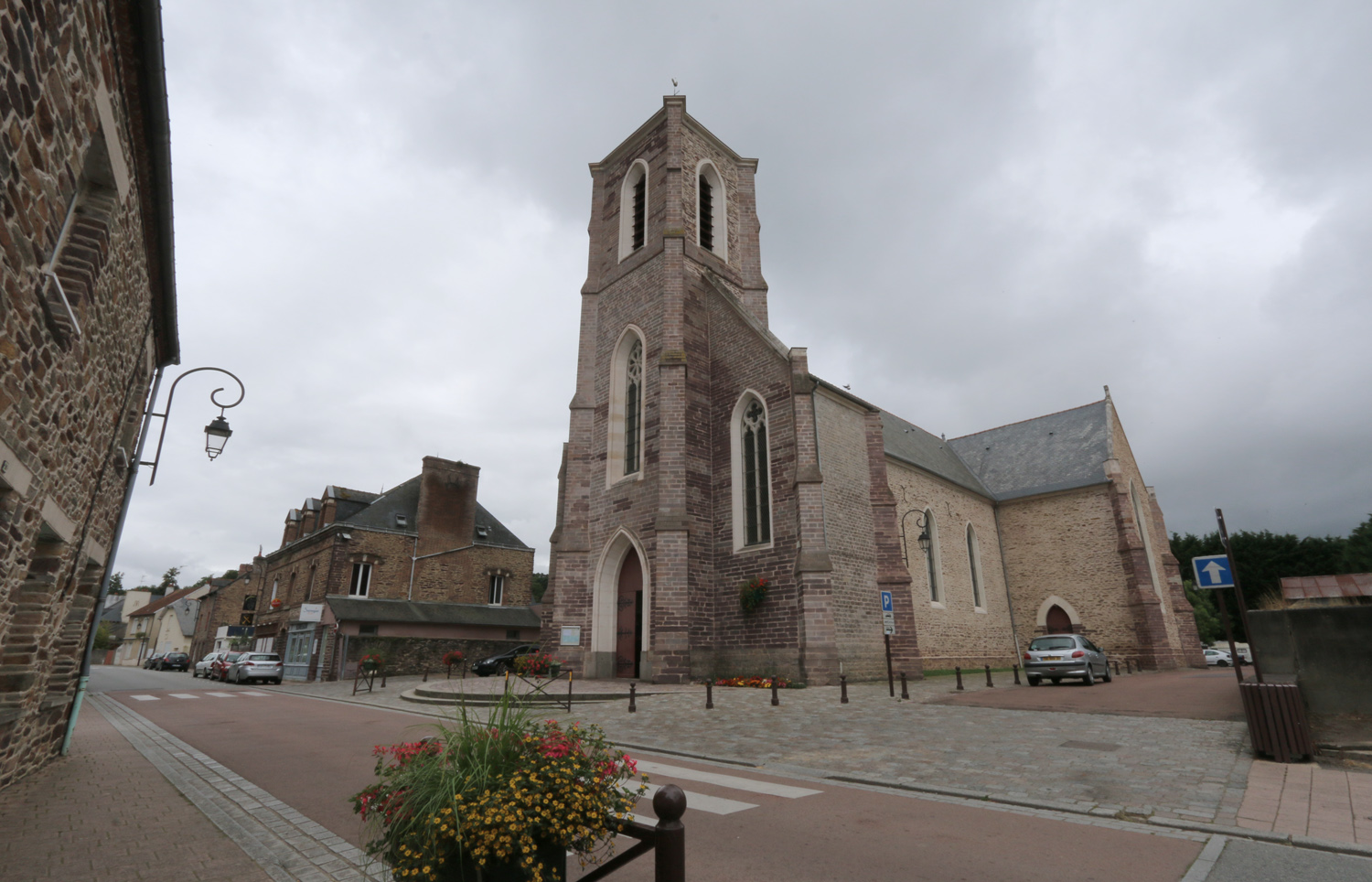
Church of Pont-Réan.

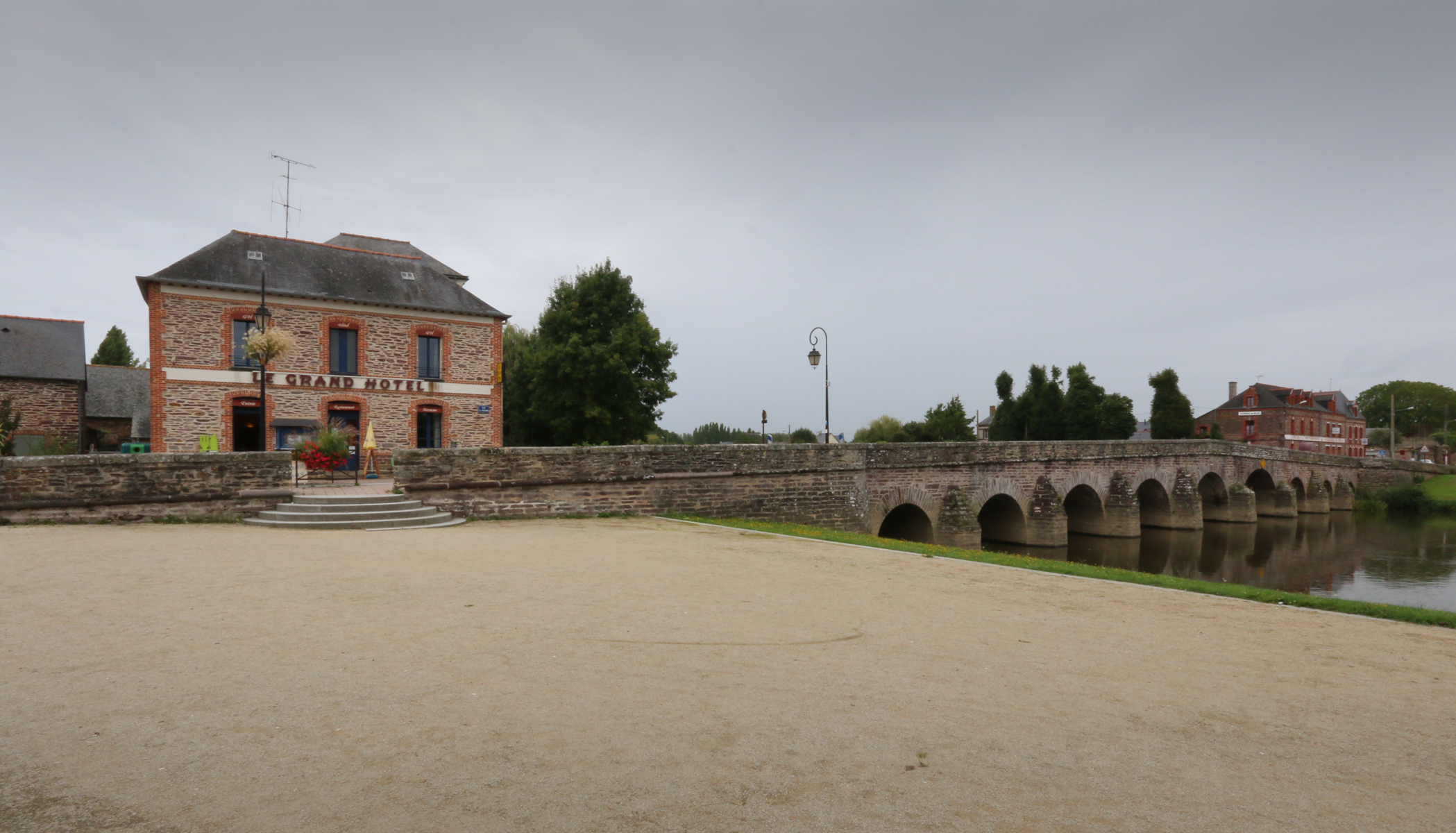
The bridge of Pont-Réan.

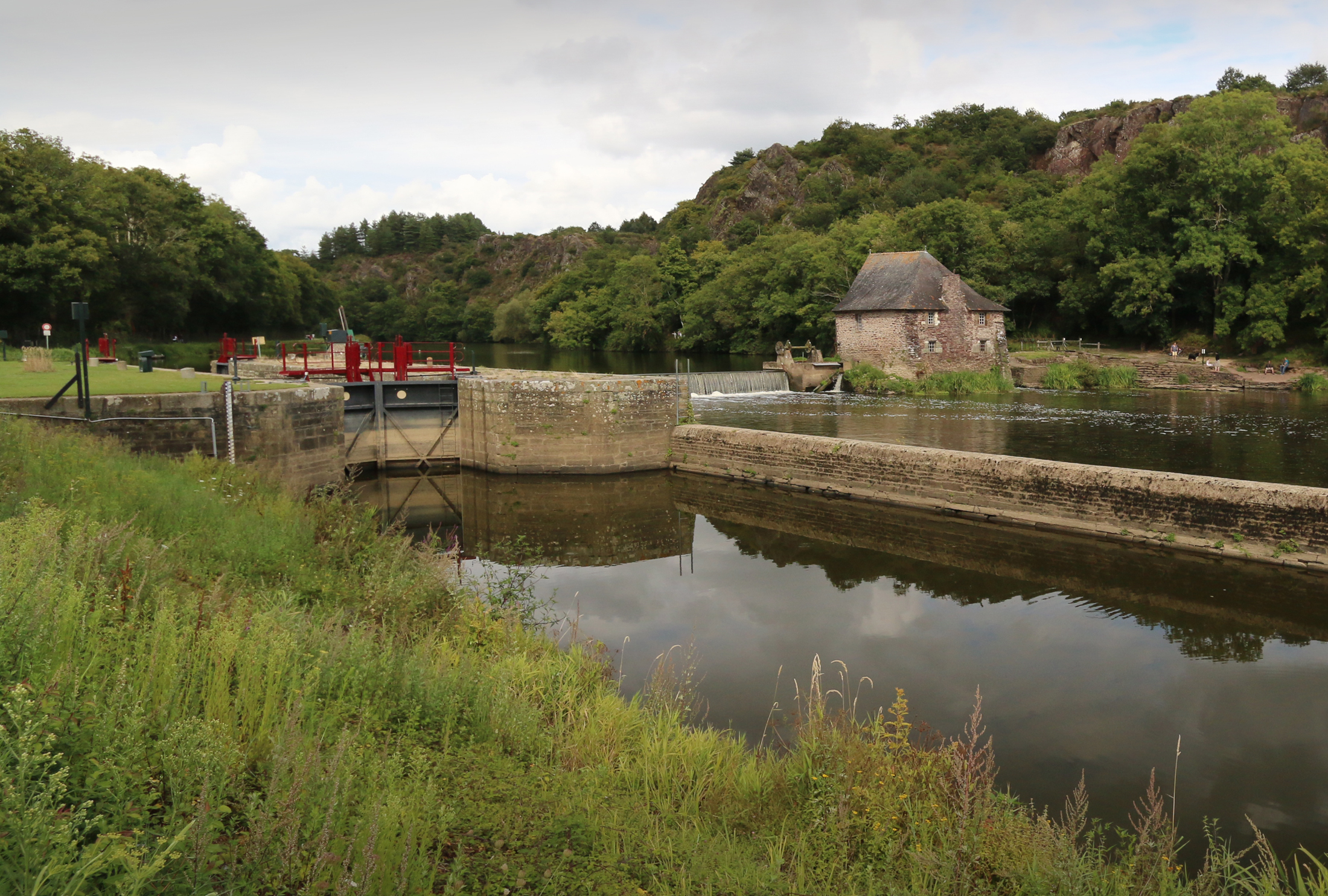
The lock and mill of Boel.

== See also ==
- Luc Urbain de Bouexic, comte de Guichen
- Communes of the Ille-et-Vilaine department
