= Val d'Anast =

Val d'Anast Traoñ Anast (Breton)
- Commune
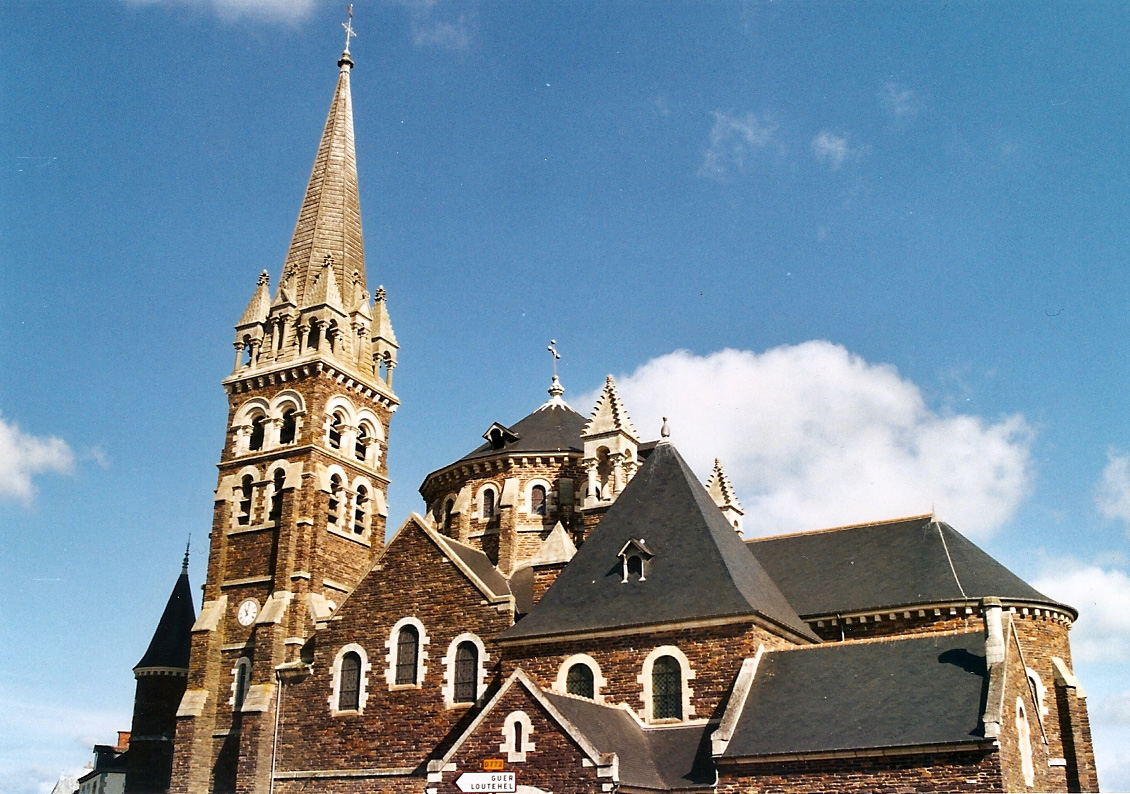
- The church in the former commune of Maure-de-Bretagne
- Location of Val d'Anast
- Location within France Location within Brittany
- Coordinates: 47°53′31″N 1°59′24″W
- Country: France
- Region: Brittany
- Department: Ille-et-Vilaine
- Arrondissement: Redon
- Canton: Guichen
- Intercommunality: Vallons de Haute-Bretagne

Government
  - Mayor (2020–2026): Pierre-Yves Reboux
- Area^{1}: 77.86 km^{2} (30.06 sq mi)
- Population (2023): 3,930
  - Density: 50.5/km^{2} (131/sq mi)
- Time zone: UTC+01:00 (CET)
  - Summer (DST): UTC+02:00 (CEST)
- INSEE/Postal code: 35168 /35330
- ^{1} French Land Register data, which excludes lakes, ponds, glaciers > 1 km^{2} (0.386 sq mi or 247 acres) and river estuaries.

Val d'Anast (French pronunciation: [val danast]; Breton: Traoñ Anast) is a commune in the department of Ille-et-Vilaine, western France. The municipality was established on 1 January 2017 by merger of the former communes of Maure-de-Bretagne (the seat) and Campel.

== Population ==
Population data refer to the commune in its geography as of January 2025.

Historical population
Year	Pop.	±% p.a.
1968	3,058	—
1975	2,935	−0.58%
1982	2,890	−0.22%
1990	2,948	+0.25%
1999	2,873	−0.29%
2007	3,520	+2.57%
2012	3,773	+1.40%
2017	3,980	+1.07%
2023	3,930	−0.21%
Source: INSEE

== See also ==
- Communes of the Ille-et-Vilaine department
