= Gaël Le Bohec =

French politician

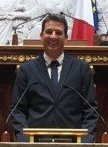

Member of the National Assembly for Ille-et-Vilaine's 4th constituency
- In office 21 June 2017 – 2022
- Preceded by: Jean-René Marsac

Personal details
- Born: 4 November 1977 (age 48) Saint-Brieuc, France
- Party: La République En Marche!
- Education: Institut catholique d'arts et métiers (ICAM)

Gaël Le Bohec (born 4 November 1977) is a French politician of La République En Marche! (LREM) who served as a member of the French National Assembly from 2017 to 2022, representing the department of Ille-et-Vilaine.

== Early career ==
Le Bohec was born in Nantes and first worked in the industrial sector with large companies. In 2015, he founded a company that helps hospitals with management and organizing stocks. He also teaches Logistics and Support Processes at the EHESP.

== Political career ==
In parliament, Le Bohec served on the Committee on Cultural Affairs and Education. In addition to his committee assignments, he was part of the French Parliamentary Friendship Group with São Tomé and Príncipe.

On 3 May 2022, Le Bohec announced that he would be standing down at the 2022 French legislative election.

== Other activities ==
- Agence France-Presse (AFP), Member of the Supervisory Board (since 2017)

== Political positions ==
In July 2019, Le Bohec voted in favor of the French ratification of the European Union’s Comprehensive Economic and Trade Agreement (CETA) with Canada.
