= Canton of Maure-de-Bretagne =

Coordinates: 47.9073°N 2.009°W

Maure-de-Bretagne
- Former canton
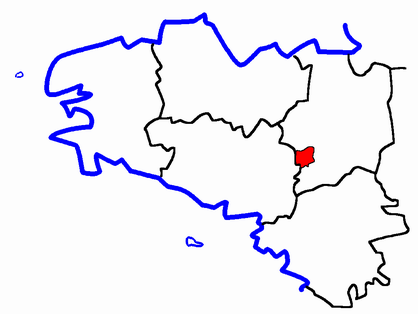
- Country: France
- Region: Brittany
- Department: Ille-et-Vilaine
- No. of communes: {{{nbcomm}}}
- Disbanded: 2015
- Area: 176 km^{2} (68 sq mi)
- Population (2012): 8,634
  - Density: 49.1/km^{2} (127/sq mi)

The Canton of Maure-de-Bretagne is a former canton of France, in the Ille-et-Vilaine département, located in the southwest of the department. It was disbanded following the French canton reorganisation which came into effect in March 2015. It consisted of 9 communes, and its population was 8,634 in 2012.

== See also ==
- Maure-de-Bretagne
