= Michel Maure =

French medical doctor and cosmetic surgeon

Michel Maure (b. 1951) is a French former medical doctor and cosmetic surgeon. He is best known for the 2008 trial brought against him by nearly 100 of his former patients. Since 1995, Maure performed over 300 operations per year.

== Trial ==
Between 2 and 15 June 2008, Maure was judged by the Sixth Correctional Court of Marseille. 97 of his former patients--93 women and four men--accused him of endangering the lives of others, unintentional wounds, lying about his work, misleading advertising, deceit regarding the nature of his services or non-delivery of services, and in one case, threats or acts of intimidation toward a patient, in his medical practice between 2001 and 2004.

== Verdict and sentencing ==
In September 2008, Maure was sentenced to four years in prison and was instructed to provide compensation to his victims, ranging from €2,000 to €12,000. Maure chose to appeal, but the sentence was upheld by the magistrates' court of Aix-en-Provence on 1 April 2009. The court is also considering a complete revocation of Maure's license to practice medicine.
