= Saint-Thurial =

Saint-Thurial Saent-Turiau (Gallo) Sant-Turiav-Porc'hoed (Breton)
- Commune
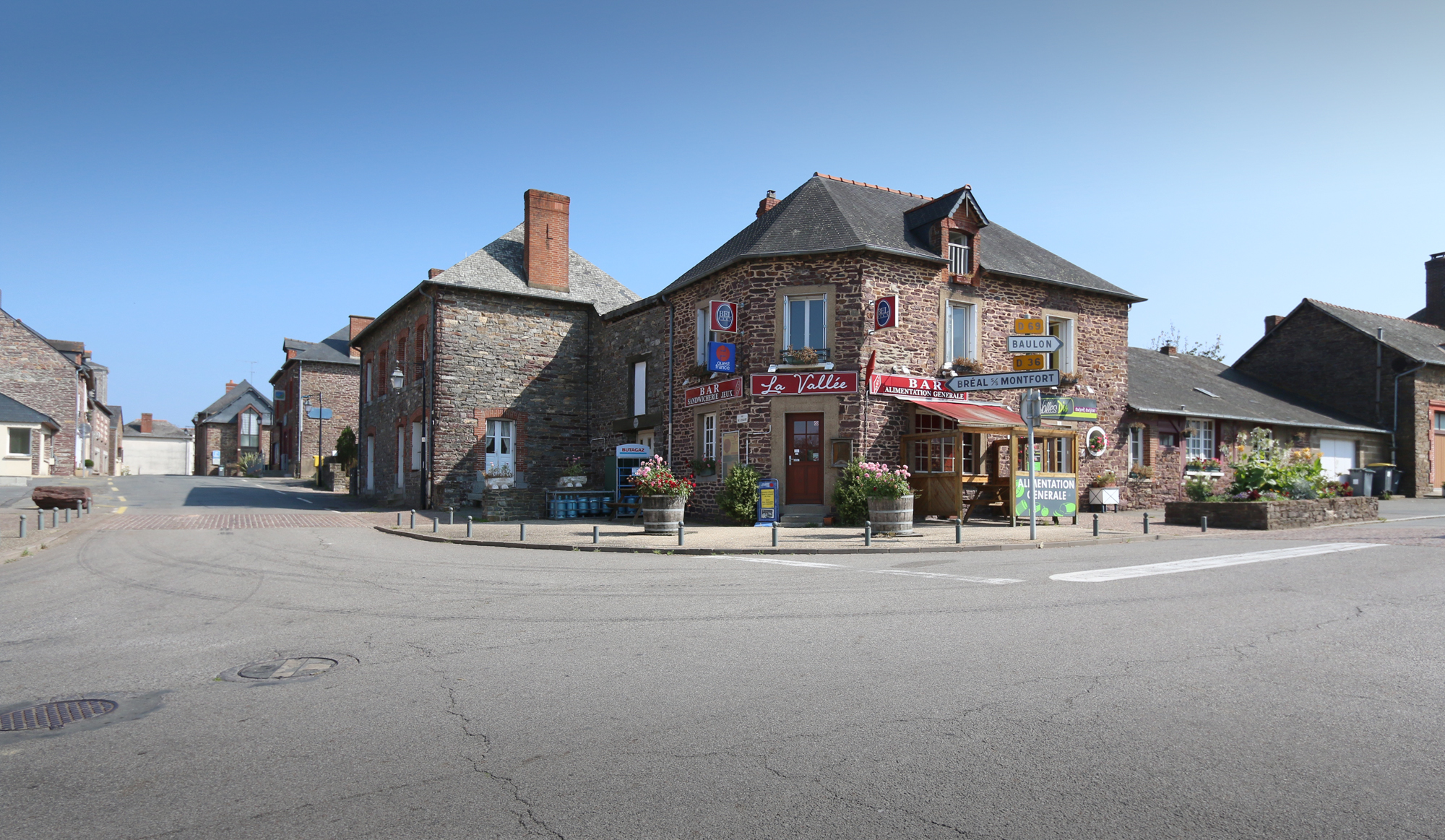
- A view within Saint-Thurial

- Coat of arms
- Location of Saint-Thurial
- Location within France Location within Brittany
- Coordinates: 48°01′48″N 1°55′50″W
- Country: France
- Region: Brittany
- Department: Ille-et-Vilaine
- Arrondissement: Rennes
- Canton: Montfort-sur-Meu
- Intercommunality: CC de Brocéliande

Government
  - Mayor (2020–2026): David Moizan
- Area^{1}: 18.01 km^{2} (6.95 sq mi)
- Highest elevation: 128 m (420 ft)
- Lowest elevation: 32 m (105 ft)
- Population (2023): 2,184
  - Density: 121.3/km^{2} (314.1/sq mi)
- Time zone: UTC+01:00 (CET)
  - Summer (DST): UTC+02:00 (CEST)
- INSEE/Postal code: 35319 /35310
- ^{1} French Land Register data, which excludes lakes, ponds, glaciers > 1 km^{2} (0.386 sq mi or 247 acres) and river estuaries.

Saint-Thurial (French pronunciation: [sɛ̃ tyʁjal]; Breton: Sant-Turiav-Porc'hoed; Gallo: Saent-Turiau) is a commune in the Ille-et-Vilaine department in Brittany in northwestern France.

== Population ==
Inhabitants of Saint-Thurial are called Thurialais in French.

Historical population
Year	Pop.	±% p.a.
1968	749	—
1975	772	+0.43%
1982	1,020	+4.06%
1990	1,273	+2.81%
1999	1,485	+1.73%
2007	1,814	+2.53%
2012	2,012	+2.09%
2017	2,084	+0.71%
2023	2,184	+0.78%
Source: INSEE

== See also ==
- Communes of the Ille-et-Vilaine department
