= La Chapelle-Bouëxic =

La Chapelle-Bouëxic Chapel-ar-Veuzid (Breton)
- Commune
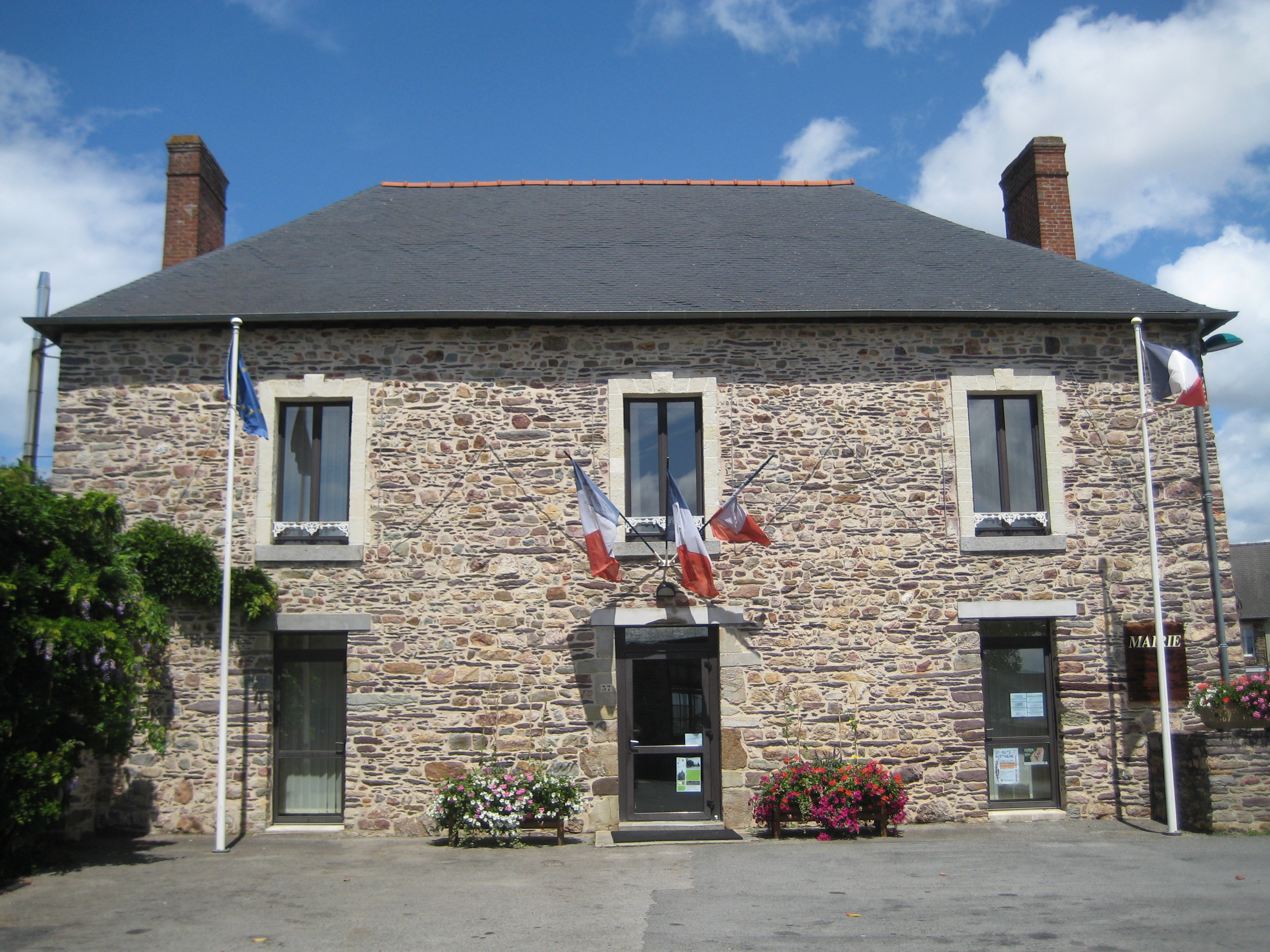
- Town hall
- Location of La Chapelle-Bouëxic
- Location within France Location within Brittany
- Coordinates: 47°55′48″N 1°56′23″W
- Country: France
- Region: Brittany
- Department: Ille-et-Vilaine
- Arrondissement: Redon
- Canton: Guichen

Government
  - Mayor (2020–2026): Roger Morazin
- Area^{1}: 20.66 km^{2} (7.98 sq mi)
- Elevation: 80 m (260 ft)
- Highest elevation: 112 m (367 ft)
- Lowest elevation: 32 m (105 ft)
- Population (2023): 1,537
  - Density: 74.39/km^{2} (192.7/sq mi)
- Time zone: UTC+01:00 (CET)
  - Summer (DST): UTC+02:00 (CEST)
- INSEE/Postal code: 35057 /35330
- ^{1} French Land Register data, which excludes lakes, ponds, glaciers > 1 km^{2} (0.386 sq mi or 247 acres) and river estuaries.

La Chapelle-Bouëxic (French pronunciation: [la ʃapɛl bwɛksik]; Breton: Chapel-ar-Veuzid) is a commune in the Ille-et-Vilaine department in Brittany in northwestern France.

It is located southwest of Rennes between Pont-Péan and Guer.

== Population ==
Inhabitants of La Chapelle-Bouëxic are called Chapellois in French.

Historical population
Year	Pop.	±% p.a.
1968	656	—
1975	629	−0.60%
1982	599	−0.70%
1990	670	+1.41%
1999	809	+2.12%
2007	1,125	+4.21%
2012	1,340	+3.56%
2017	1,475	+1.94%
2023	1,537	+0.69%
Source: INSEE

== See also ==
- Communes of the Ille-et-Vilaine department
