= Canton of Guichen =

Coordinates: 47.9596°N 1.8181°W

Guichen
- Canton
- Country: France
- Region: Brittany
- Department: Ille-et-Vilaine
- No. of communes: {{{nbcomm}}}
- Area: 388.54 km^{2} (150.02 sq mi)
- Population (2023): 36,443
  - Density: 93.795/km^{2} (242.93/sq mi)
- INSEE code: 35 11

The Canton of Guichen is a canton of France, in the Ille-et-Vilaine département, located in the southwest of the department. At the French canton reorganisation which came into effect in March 2015, the canton was expanded from 8 to 16 communes (2 of which merged into the new commune Val d'Anast).

It consists of the following communes:

1. Baulon
2. Bourg-des-Comptes
3. Bovel
4. Les Brulais
5. La Chapelle-Bouëxic
6. Comblessac
7. Goven
8. Guichen
9. Guignen
10. Lassy
11. Loutehel
12. Mernel
13. Saint-Séglin
14. Saint-Senoux
15. Val d'Anast
