= Alexis-Armand Charost =

French Roman Catholic cardinal

His Eminence Alexis-Armand Charost
- Cardinal, Archbishop of Rennes
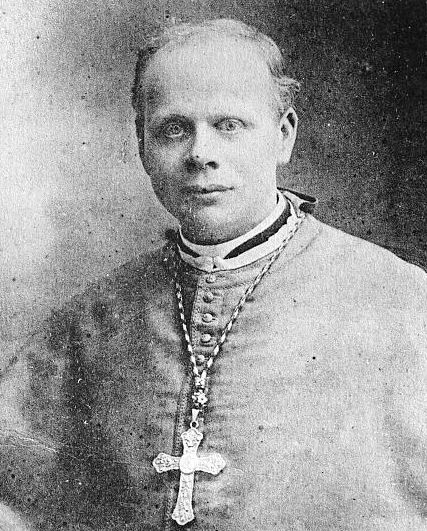
- Church: Catholic Church
- Archdiocese: Rennes
- Appointed: 22 September 1921
- Term ended: 7 November 1930
- Predecessor: Auguste-René-Marie Dubourg
- Successor: René-Pierre Mignen
- Other post: Cardinal-Priest of Santa Maria della Vittoria (1922-30)
- Previous posts: Titular Bishop of Miletopolis (1913); Auxiliary Bishop of Cambrai (1913); Bishop of Lille (1913-20); Titular Archbishop of Chersona (1920-21); Coadjutor Archbishop of Rennes (1920-21)

Orders
- Ordination: 19 May 1883
- Consecration: 13 May 1913 by Auguste-René-Marie Dubourg
- Created cardinal: 11 December 1922 by Pius XI
- Rank: Cardinal-Priest

Personal details
- Born: 14 November 1860 Le Mans, Second French Empire
- Died: 7 November 1930 (aged 69) Rennes, French Third Republic
- Buried: Rennes Cathedral
- Parents: Alexis Isidore Joseph Charost; Marie Louise Girault
- Education: Pontifical French Seminary; Catholic University of the West
- Motto: Per ipsam cum ipsa in ipsa
- Coat of arms

Styles of Alexis Charost
- Reference style: His Eminence
- Spoken style: Your Eminence
- Informal style: Cardinal
- See: Rennes

Alexis-Armand Charost (14 November 1860 – 7 November 1930) was a French cardinal of the Catholic Church. He served as Archbishop of Rennes from 1921 until his death, and was elevated to the cardinalate in 1922.

== Biography ==
Alexis Charost was born in Le Mans, and studied at the seminary in Le Mans, Pontifical French Seminary in Rome, and Catholic University of Angers. He was ordained to the priesthood on 19 May 1883, and then taught at the collège Sainte-Croix of Le Mans until 1892. Charost served as director of the Internship of Notre Dame de la Couture in Le Mans from 1892 to 1894, whence he became secretary to Archbishop Guillaume Labouré. He was later made titular canon of the cathedral chapter of Rennes in 1899, and vicar general and director of secondary studies of the same in 1909.

On 14 February 1913, Charost was appointed auxiliary bishop of Cambrai and titular bishop of Milopotamus by Pope Pius X. He received his episcopal consecration on the following 13 May from Archbishop Auguste Dubourg, with Bishops François-Marie-Joseph Delamaire and Olivier de Durfort de Civbac serving as co-consecrators, in the metropolitan cathedral of Rennes.

Charost was later named the first Bishop of Lille on 21 November of that same year, and served as acting chancellor of Lille Catholic University in 1915, rising to become full chancellor in 1919. During World War I, he encouraged the Catholics under his jurisdiction to practice passive resistance against the German Empire, who had occupied Lille; the bishop also protested the Germans' actions to Cardinal Felix von Hartmann. On 15 June 1920, he was promoted to coadjutor archbishop of Rennes and titular archbishop of Chersonesus in Zechia. Charost later succeeded Cardinal Dubourg as Archbishop of Rennes upon the latter's death on 22 September 1921.

Pope Pius XI created him cardinal priest of S. Maria della Vittoria in the consistory of 11 December 1922. Charost served as papal legate to the centennial celebrations in honor of Cardinal Charles Lavigerie in Algiers on 25 August 1925, to the fiftieth anniversary of the Université catholique de Lille on 14 March 1927, and to the celebrations in honor of St. Thérèse de Lisieux in Lisieux on 15 September 1929.

The cardinal died in Rennes, at age 69. He is buried in the Cathedral of Rennes.

Catholic Church titles
Preceded by none	Bishop of Lille; 1913–1920	Succeeded by Hector-Raphaël Quilliet
Preceded by Auguste-René-Marie Dubourg	Archbishop of Rennes; 1921–1930	Succeeded by René-Pierre Mignen
