= Diocese of Moulins =

Catholic diocese in France

Coordinates: 46.57°N 3.33°E

Diocese of Moulins Dioecesis Molinensis Diocèse de Moulins

Catholic
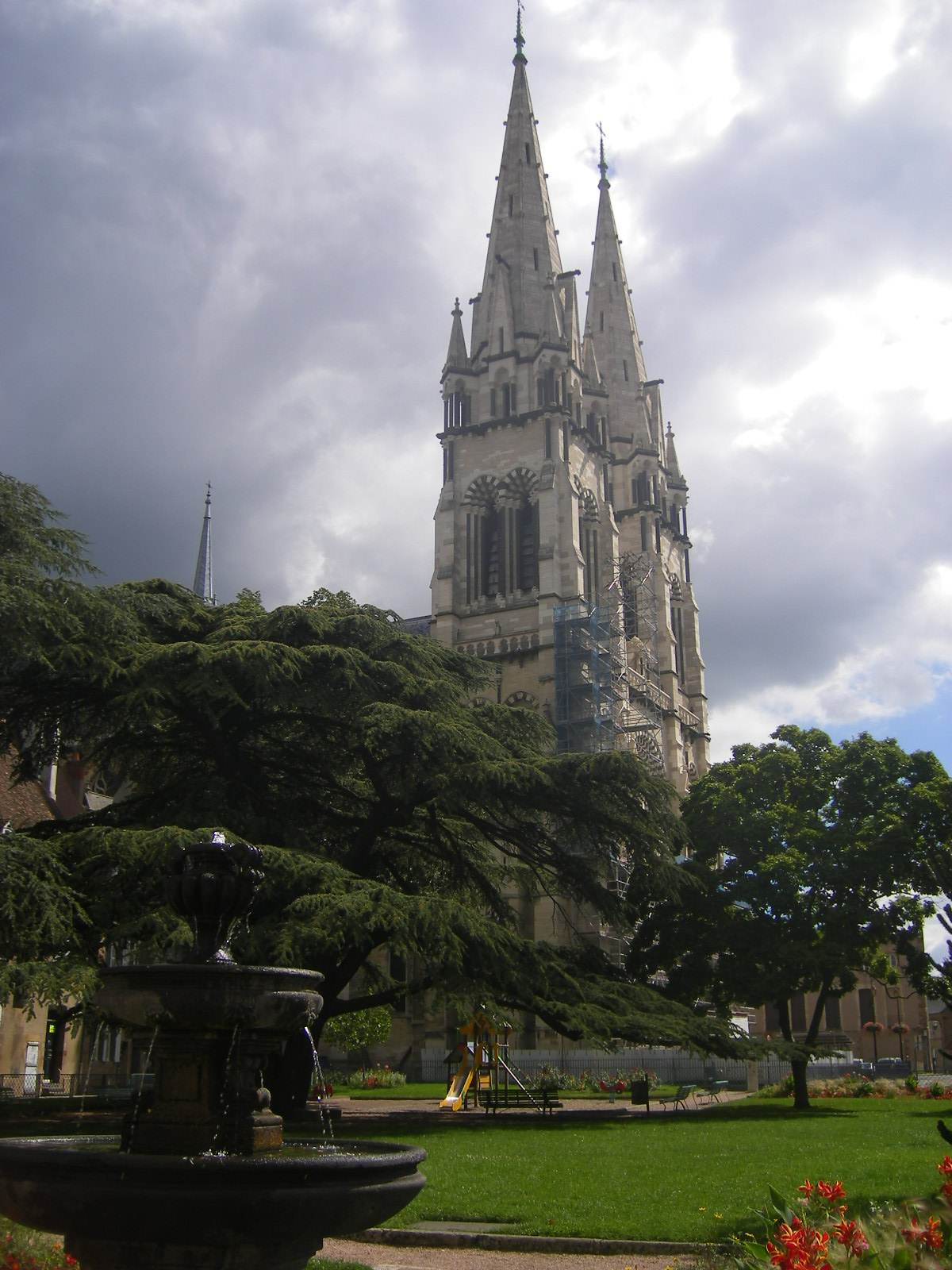
- Moulins Cathedral

- Coat of arms

Location
- Country: France
- Ecclesiastical province: Clermont
- Metropolitan: Archdiocese of Clermont

Statistics
- Area: 7,381 km^{2} (2,850 sq mi)
- Population: Total; Catholics: (as of 2021); 335,065; 199,850 (60%)
- Parishes: 18

Information
- Denomination: Roman Catholic
- Sui iuris church: Latin Church
- Rite: Roman Rite
- Established: 27 July 1817
- Cathedral: Cathedral Basilica of Notre Dame in Moulins, Allier
- Patron saint: Notre Dame
- Secular priests: 45 (diocesan); 37 (religious Orders)

Current leadership
- Pope: Leo XIV
- Bishop: Marc Beaumont
- Metropolitan Archbishop: François Kalist

Map

Website
- Website of the Diocese

The Diocese of Moulins (Latin: Dioecesis Molinensis; French: Diocèse de Moulins) is a Latin diocese of the Catholic Church in France. The episcopal see is located in the city of Moulins. The diocese comprises all of the department of Allier in the region of Auvergne.

== History ==
The diocese was created in 1788, but the new bishop, Étienne-Jean-Baptiste-Louis des Gallois de la Tour, although appointed by King Louis XVI on 29 May 1789, had not been approved (preconized) by Pope Pius VI before the outbreak of the French Revolution in July 1789.

Under the Civil Constitution of the Clergy (12 July 1790) there was erected a diocese of Allier, with a Constitutional Bishop resident at Moulins. The French government, however, did not have the canonical power to erect dioceses, and therefore this new diocese was in schism with Rome.

The first Constitutional Bishop, Msgr. François-Xavier Laurent, had been a curé in the diocese of Autun before becoming a member of the Estates General; after his election by the voters of Allier, he was consecrated in Paris on 6 March 1791 by Constitutional Bishop Gobel. In 1793, he abdicated and married. Laurent died in 1796, or 10 May 1821.

The appointment and consecration of Laurent, as well as the erection of the Diocese of Allier, were annulled by Pope Pius VI. Laurent's consecration was labelled blasphemous and schismatic.

Under the Concordat of 11 June 1817 between King Louis XVIII and Pope Pius VII, the diocese of Moulins was re-established, from parts of the dioceses of Autun, Bourges, and Clermont-Ferrand, to cover the department of Allier. The implementation of the Concordat was delayed, however, by various circumstances brought about by the Hundred Days and the occupation of France by the Allies, as well as by the lack of funds both on the part of the French monarchy and the Papacy, to say nothing about the machinations of ministers and diplomats.

On 6 October 1822, Pope Pius VII issued a bull which created fourteen dioceses in France, including Moulins. The first bishop was appointed in 1822, and in the same year the medieval collegiate church at Moulins was established as the Cathedral of Notre-Dame, the seat of the diocese. The diocese of Moulins was made a suffragan of the Archdiocese of Sens. This situation continued until 8 December 2002, when a major reorganization of the French diocesan structure made Moulins a suffragan of the Archbishop of Clermont.

The current bishop is Marc Beaumont, appointed in 2021.

== List of bishops ==
- Étienne-Jean-Baptiste-Louis des Gallois de la Tour
  - François-Xavier Laurent (Constitutional Bishop) (1791–1793)
  - Antoine Butaud-Dupoux (Constitutional Bishop (1798–1801)
- Antoine de La Grange de Pons 1822–1849
- Pierre-Simon-Louis-Marie de Dreux-Brézé 1850–1893
- Auguste-René-Marie Dubourg 1893–1906 (appointed Archbishop of Rennes)
- Emile-Louis-Cornil Lobbedey 1906–1911
- Jean-Baptiste-Etienne-Honoré Penon 1911–1926
- Jean-Baptiste-Auguste Gonon 1926–1942
- Georges-Clément-Joseph-Edouard Jacquin 1942–1956
- Francis-Albert Bougon 1956–1975
- André Bernard Michel Quélen 1975–1998
- Philippe Xavier Ignace Barbarin 1998–2002 (appointed Archbishop of Lyon)
- Pascal Roland 2003–2012 (appointed Bishop of Belley-Ars)
- Laurent Percerou 2013–2020 (appointed Bishop of Nantes)
- Marc Beaumont 2021–present

== See also ==
- Catholic Church in France

== Books ==
- Fisquet, Honore (1864). La France pontificale (Gallia Christiana): Metropole de Sens: Troyes et Moulins (in French). Paris: Etienne Repos. pp. 163–175. [2 vols bound in 1; 'Moulins' is at the end of the second volume]
- Gams, Pius Bonifatius (1873). Series episcoporum Ecclesiae catholicae: quotquot innotuerunt a beato Petro apostolo. Ratisbon: Typis et Sumptibus Georgii Josephi Manz. p. 580.
- Pisani, Paul (1907). Répertoire biographique de l'épiscopat constitutionnel (1791-1802) (in French). Paris: A. Picard et fils.
- Ritzler, Remigius; Sefrin, Pirminus (1968). Hierarchia Catholica medii et recentioris aevi sive summorum pontificum, S. R. E. cardinalium, ecclesiarum antistitum series... A pontificatu Pii PP. VII (1800) usque ad pontificatum Gregorii PP. XVI (1846) (in Latin). Vol. VII. Monasterii: Libr. Regensburgiana.
- Ritzler, Remigius; Pirminus Sefrin (1978). Hierarchia catholica Medii et recentioris aevi... A Pontificatu PII PP. IX (1846) usque ad Pontificatum Leonis PP. XIII (1903) (in Latin). Vol. VIII. Il Messaggero di S. Antonio.
- Pięta, Zenon (2002). Hierarchia catholica medii et recentioris aevi... A pontificatu Pii PP. X (1903) usque ad pontificatum Benedictii PP. XV (1922) (in Latin). Vol. IX. Padua: Messagero di San Antonio. ISBN 978-88-250-1000-8.
- Société bibliographique (France) (1907). L'épiscopat français depuis le Concordat jusqu'à la Séparation (1802-1905). Paris: Librairie des Saints-Pères.
