= Santa Francesca Romana =

Catholic basilica in of Rome, Italy

- Basilica of Saint Frances of Rome
- Santa Maria Nova
- Basilica di Santa Francesca Romana
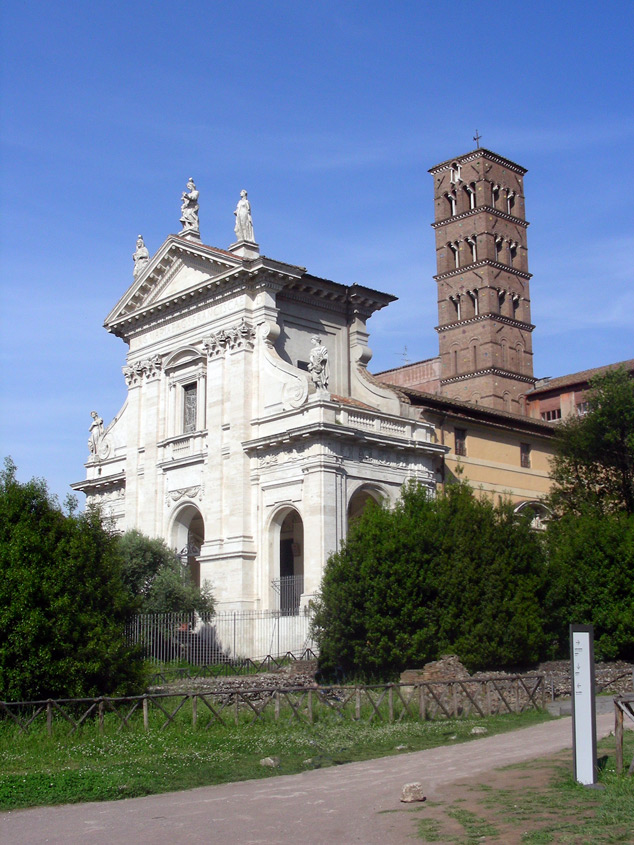
- Travertine façade (1615) and 12th-century Romanesque bell-tower
- Click on the map for a fullscreen view
- 41°53′28.21″N 12°29′19.87″E
- Location: Piazza di Santa Francesca Romana, Rome
- Country: Italy
- Language: Italian
- Denomination: Catholic
- Sui iuris church: Latin Church
- Religious order: Olivetan Benedictine

History
- Status: minor basilica, titular church
- Founded: 8th–10th centuries AD
- Founder: Pope Paul I
- Dedication: Frances of Rome
- Dedicated: 16th century
- Earlier dedication: Mary

Architecture
- Architectural type: Romanesque

Administration
- Diocese: Rome

Santa Francesca Romana (Italian: Basilica di Santa Francesca Romana), previously known as Santa Maria Nova, is a Catholic church situated next to the Roman Forum in the rione Campitelli in Rome, Italy.

== History ==
An oratory putatively was established in the eighth century under Pope Paul I in the portico of the former Temple of Venus and Roma. Tradition holds that at this site Saint Peter prayed at the site to challenge Simon Magus. According to this legend, Simon Magus wanted to prove his pagan powers were greater than those of the apostles, and started levitating in front of Peter. The apostle fell on his knees to prayer, asking God to demonstrate his pre-eminence, and Simon fell, dying. Tradition holds that the basalt stones where the apostle's knees during prayer are embedded in the wall of the south transept. A church at the site was known by the tenth century, was named Santa Maria Nova (or "Nuova", "New St Mary"), to distinguish it from the other church inside the Roman forum devoted to St Mary, Santa Maria Antiqua ("Ancient St Mary"), which had fallen into ruin by then. The relics from the ancient church were moved to this church under Pope Leo. Santa Maria Nuova was enlarged in the second half of the tenth century, and then rebuilt by Pope Honorius III in the thirteenth century, adding the campanile and the apse, as well as being decorated with a mosaic Maestà, a depiction of the Madonna enthroned accompanied by saints. The belltower and apse are now located at the east end of former Roman temple, where the portico and entry stairs stood. Behind (East) of the apse and bell tower are a jumble of structures forming the former monastery with two small courtyards. Flanking the north of these structures and extending further west on both sides towards the Colosseum are the remaining outer columns of the massive ancient Roman temple.

Since 1352 the church has been in the care of the Olivetans. In the 16th century, the church was rededicated to Frances of Rome (Francesca Buzzi), who was canonized in 1608 and whose relics are in the crypt. The interior of the church has undergone many refurbishments. The present travertine porch and façade (1615) were designed and built by Carlo Lambardi.

== Description ==
The inscriptions found in Santa Francesca Romana (S. Maria Nuova), a valuable source illustrating the history of the church, have been collected and published by Vincenzo Forcella.

The interior, a single nave with side chapels, was rebuilt by Lombardi in the years preceding Francesca Buzzi's canonization, beginning in 1595. In the middle of the nave is the rectangular schola cantorum of the old church, covered in Cosmatesque mosaics. Among the altarpieces are works by Pietro Tedeschi, Padre Pozzi, and Subleyras.

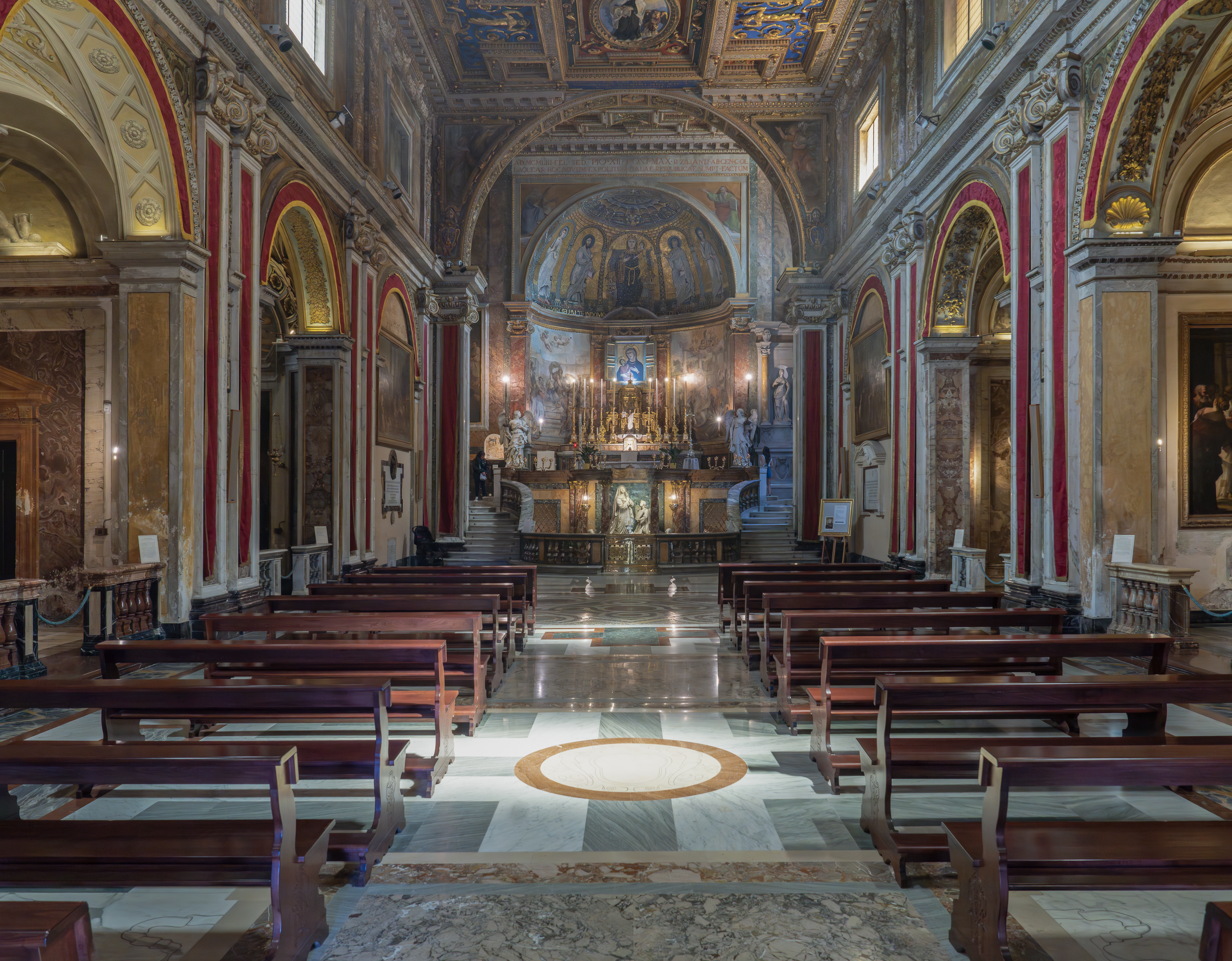
Nave

The sacristy houses the precious Madonna Glykophilousa ("Our Lady of Tenderness"), an early 5th-century icon brought from Santa Maria Antiqua. The twelfth-century Madonna and Child had been painted over. It was meticulously detached from the panel in 1950.

The tomb of Pope Gregory XI, who returned the papacy to Rome from Avignon, reconstructed to a design by Per Paulo Olivieri (signed and dated 1584) is in the south transept.

The Deaconry was suppressed on 8 August 1661. S. Maria Nova was reestablished, as the Titulus of a Cardinal Priest, on 17 March 1887 by Pope Leo XIII. The titulus of the church remains Sancta Mariae Novae; the current Cardinal Priest of the Titulus S. Mariae Novae is Péter Erdő. A Cardinal Priest no longer has any jurisdiction over his titular church or its clergy. He is only the Cardinal Protector.

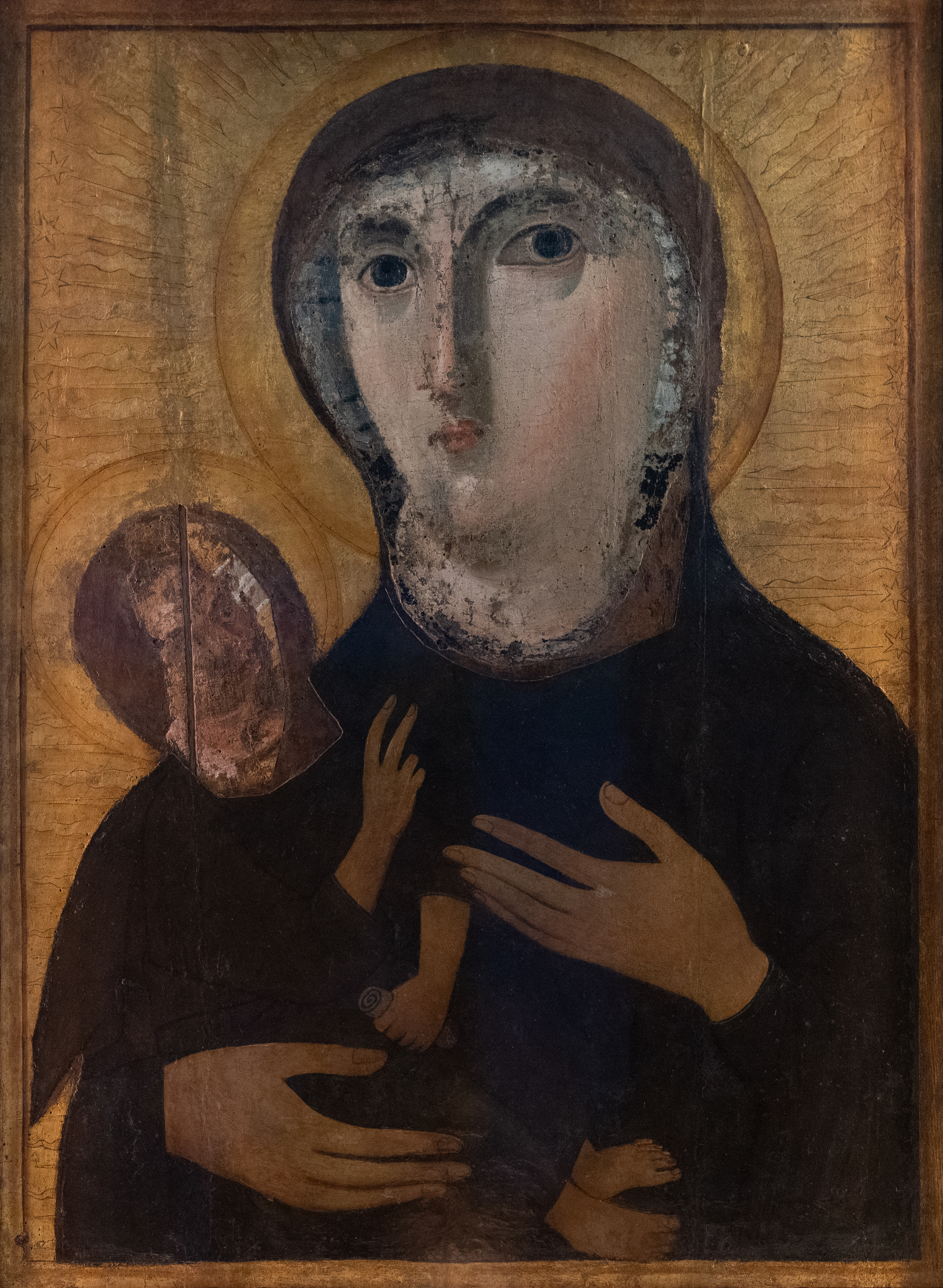
Madonna Glykophilousa

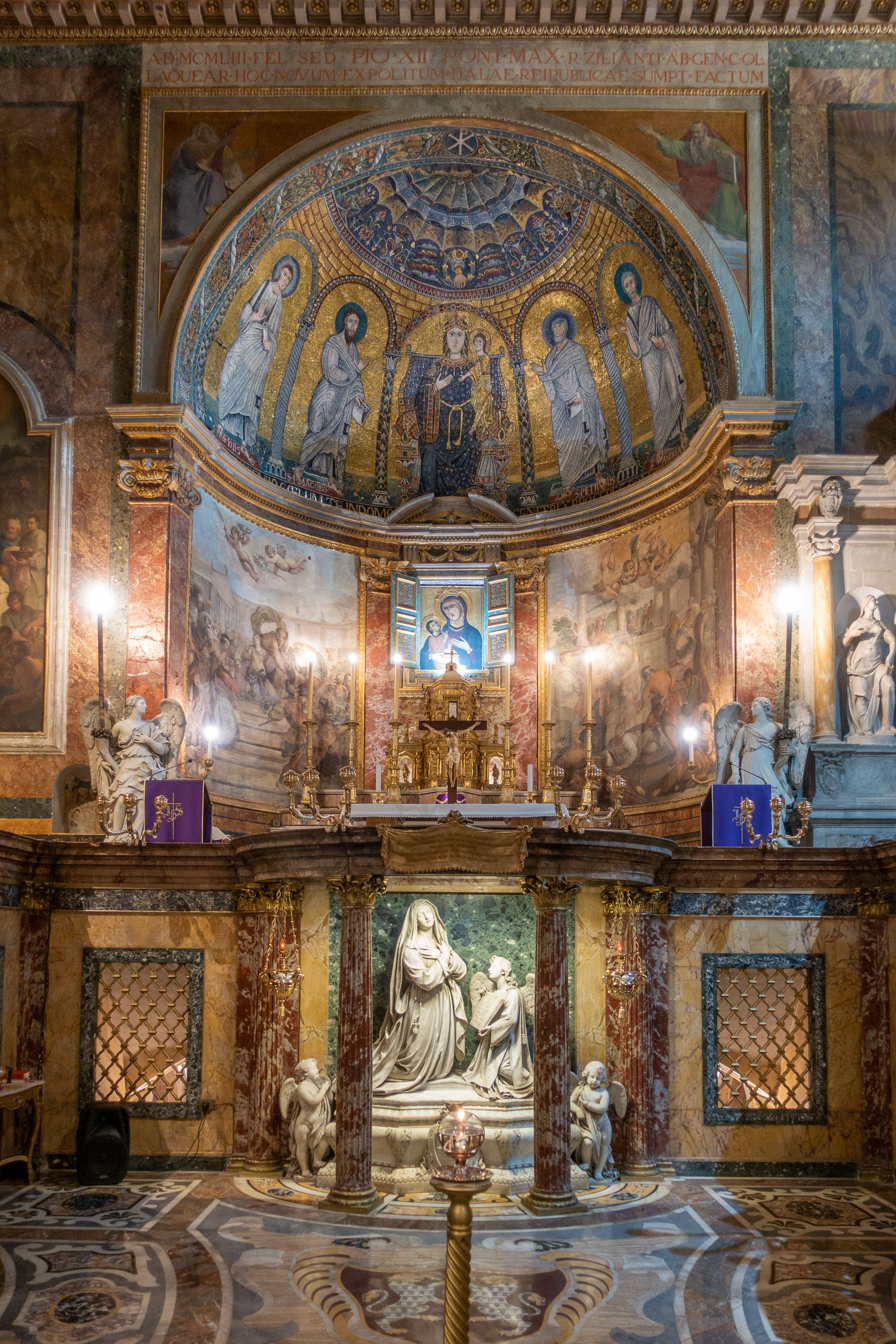
Apse mosaic, altar, confessio

Saint Francesca Romana has been named the patron of car drivers, because of a legend that an angel used to light her way with a lamp when she travelled at night. Automobiles line up on the day of her feast (9 March) as far as the Colosseum, to partake of the blessing.

The facade of the Church of Holy Cross College, in Clonliffe in Dublin, Ireland, is a replica of Santa Francesca Romana. It was designed by the Gothic Revival Architect James Joseph McCarthy and is one of the few exceptions to his list of Gothic works.

=== Confessio ===
The confessio is the enclosed area below the altar, built between 1638 and 1649 to a design by Gian Lorenzo Bernini. At its center is a sculptural group of St Frances and the angel. Bernini's sculpture was taken during the French occupation in 1798 and is now lost, and was replaced in 1866 by the sculptor Giosuè Meli.

== Cardinal Deacons of S. Maria Nova ==
=== 12th century ===
- Teobaldo Boccapecci (c.1103 – December 1123)
- Aymery de la Châtre (December 1123 – 28 May 1141)
- Giovanni (17 December 1143 – 1153)
- Hieronymus ( 1164 – 1167 ?)
- Ughizio ( 1172 – 1173)
- Matthaeus (March 1178 – 1182)
- Bernardo (12 March 1188 – 1193)

=== 14th century ===
- Pietro Valeriano Duraguerra (17 December 1295 – 17 December 1302)
- Raimundus de Got (15 December 1305 – 26 June 1310)
- Raimundus de Fargis (19 December 1310 – 5 October 1346)
- Pierre Roger de Beaufort (29 May 1348 – 30 December 1370); elected Pope Gregory XI (1370–1378)
- Ludovico de Altavilla (18 September 1378 – ca. 1380) [by Urban VI]
- Amadeo de Saluzzo (23 December 1383 – 28 June 1419) [Avignon Obedience]
- Marino Buleanus, OSB [Bulcani, Vulcani] (17 December 1384 – 8 August 1394) [by Urban VI]

=== 15th century ===
- Jacobus (Giacopo) de Torso Utinensis (9 May 1408 – 1413) [by Gregory XII, Roman Obedience]
- Pietro Barbo (1 July 1440 – 16 June 1451); translated to S. Marco, later Pope Paul II (1464–1471)
- Francesco Gonzaga (2 April 1462 – 21 October 1483)
- Giovanni Arcimboldo (15 November 1483 – 2 October 1488)
- Giovanni Battista Orsini (23 March 1489 – 27 February 1493); translated to SS. Giovanni e Paolo
- Cesare Borgia (23 September 1493 – 18 August 1498); resigned
- Raymond Pérault, OSA (Peraudi) (29 April 1499 – 5 September 1505)

=== 16th century ===
- Francesco Lloris y de Borja (17 December 1505 – 22 July 1506)
- Sigismondo Gonzaga (16 December 1506 – 3 October 1525)
- Ercole Gonzaga (5 May 1527 – 3 March 1563)
- Federico Gonzaga (4 March 1563 – 21 February 1565)
- Ippolito d'Este (13 April 1565 – 2 December 1572)
- Filippo Guastavillani (14 July 1574 – 8 November 1577)
- Andreas von Austria (11 December 1577 – 12 November 1600)

=== 17th century ===
- Alessandro d'Este (15 November 1600 – 11 January 1621); translated to the Deaconry of S. Eustachio
- Maurizio di Savoia (17 March 1621 – 19 April 1621); translated to the Deaconry of S. Eustachio
- Ippolito Aldobrandini (17 May 1621 – 16 March 1626); translated to the Deaconry of S. Angelo in Pescheria
- Marzio Ginetti (6 October 1627 – 6 February 1634); translated to the Deaconry of S. Angelo in Pescheria
- Giulio Gabrielli (10 February 1642 – 10 November 1642); translated to the Deaconry of S. Agata de' Goti
- Virginio Orsini, OSIoHieros. (10 November 1642 – 14 March 1644); translated to the Deaconry of S. Maria in Cosmedin
- Rinaldo d'Este (28 November 1644 – 12 December 1644); translated to the Deaconry of S. Niccolo in Carcere
- Giancarlo de' Medici (20 March 1645 – 6 March 1656)

== Cardinal Priests of S. Maria Nova ==
- Charles-Philippe Place (1887–1893)
- Léon-Benoit-Charles Thomas (1893–1894)
- Joseph-Christian-Ernest Bourret (1894–1896)
- Guillaume-Marie-Joseph Labouré (1898–1906)
- Louis-Henri-Joseph Luçon (1907–1930)
- Francesco Marchetti Selvaggiani (1930–1936)
- Enrico Sibilia (1936–1939)
- Adam Stefan Sapieha (1946–1951)
- Joseph Wendel (1953–1960)
- Luis Concha Córdoba (1961–1975)
- Emmanuel Kiwanuka Nsubuga (1976–1991)
- Angelo Sodano (1991–1994; in commendam 1994–2022, when he became Cardinal Bishop)
- Péter Erdő (2023–present)

== Gallery ==
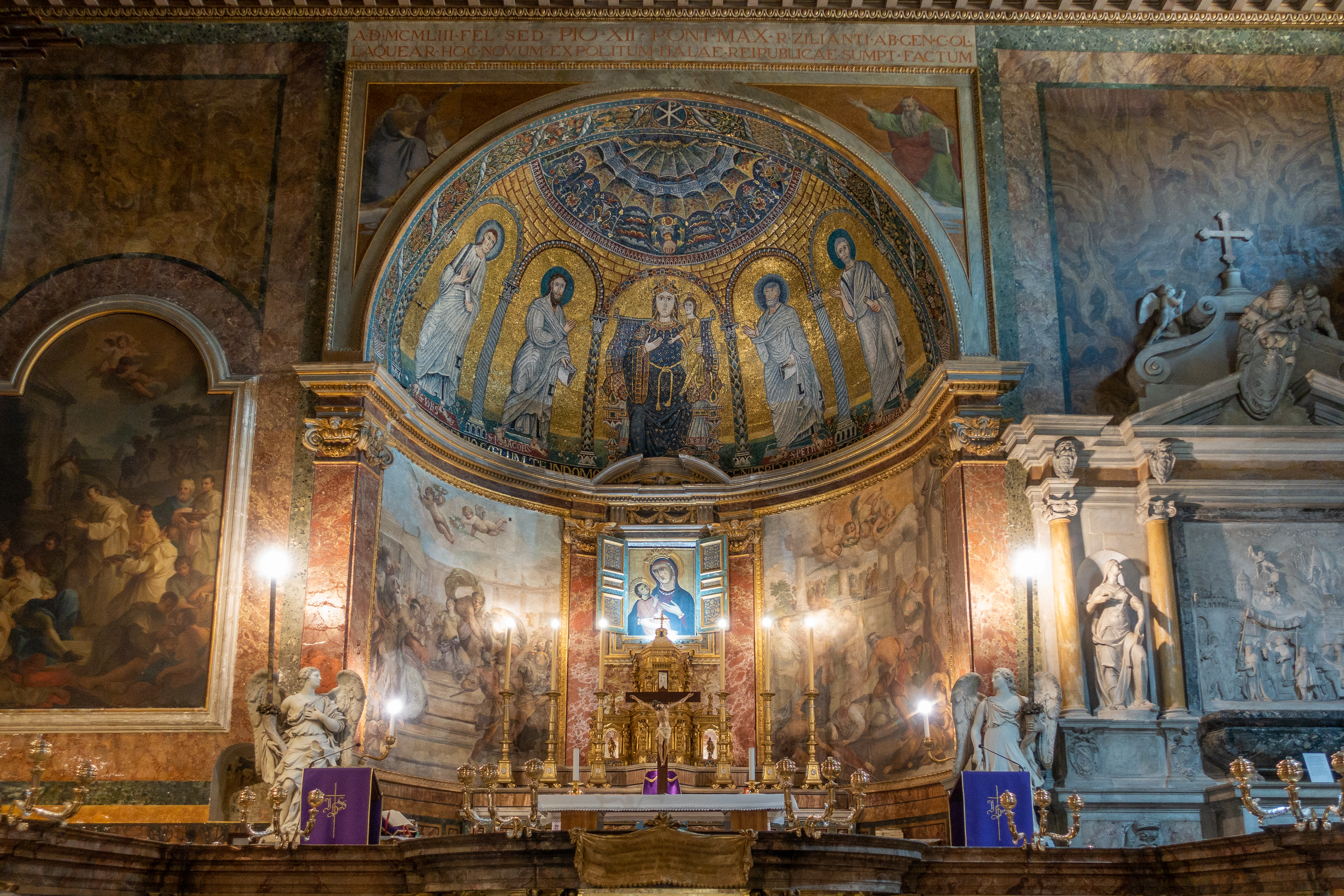
Apse mosaic, altar

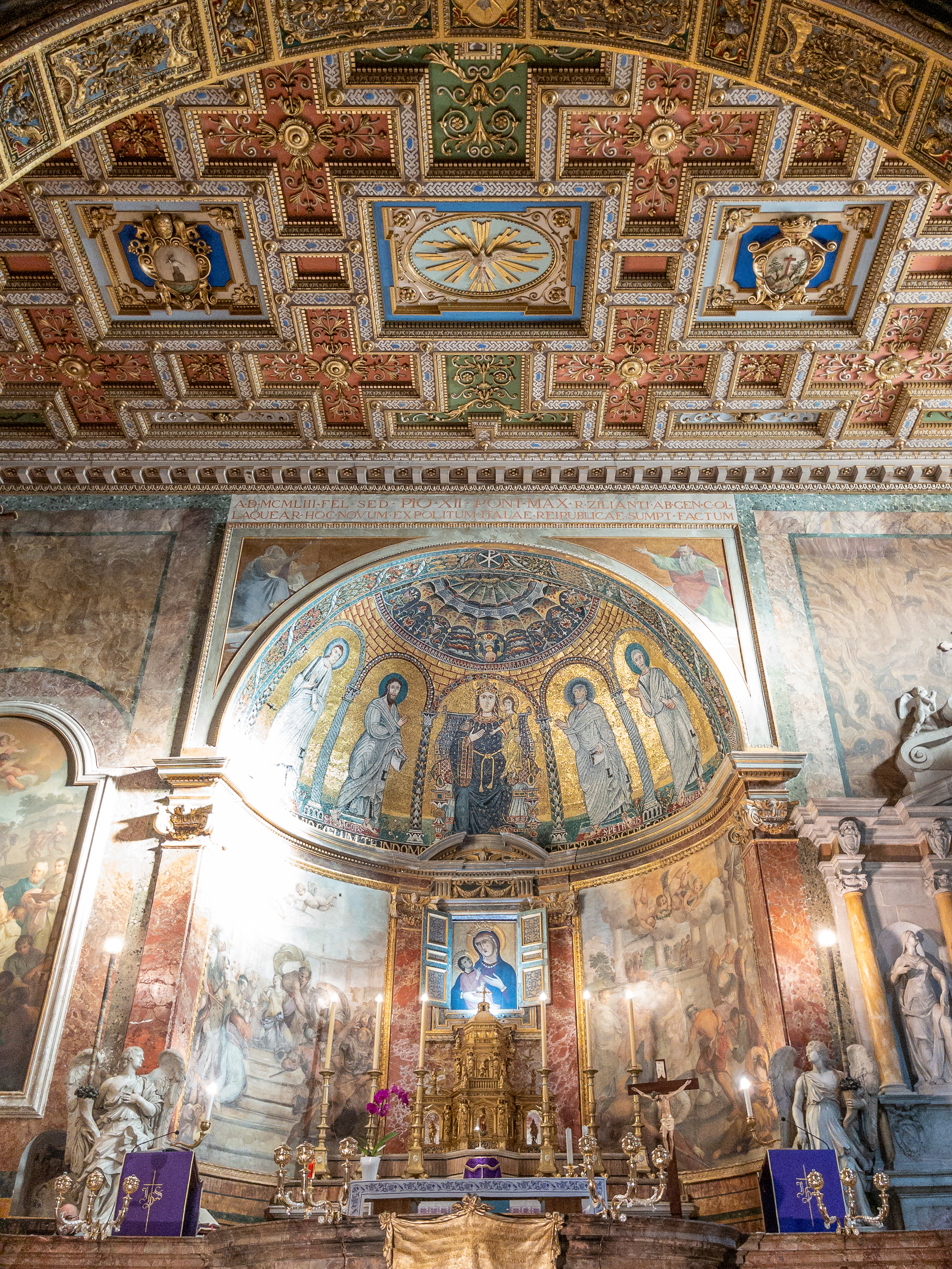
Apse mosaic

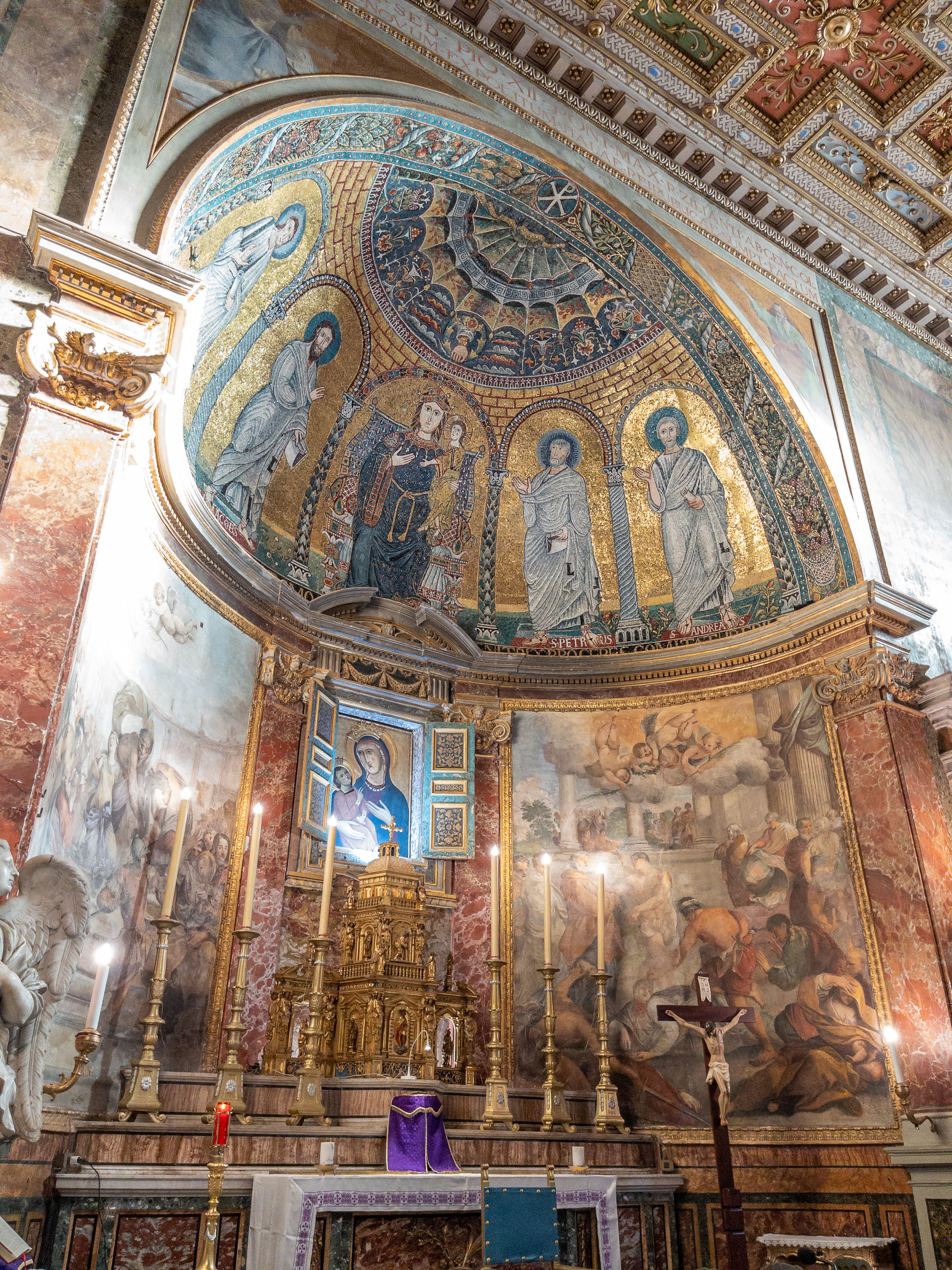
Apse mosaic

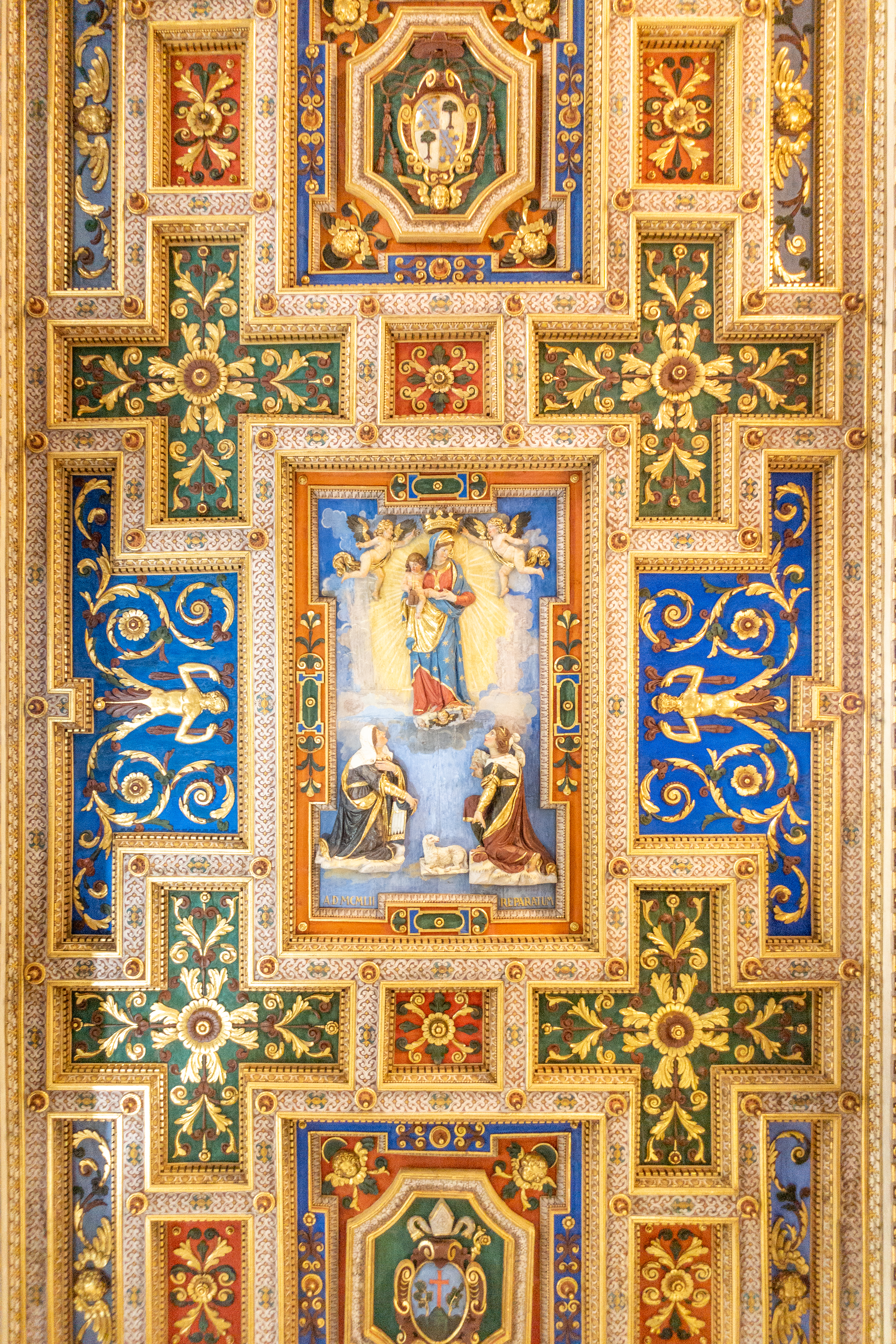
Coffered ceiling

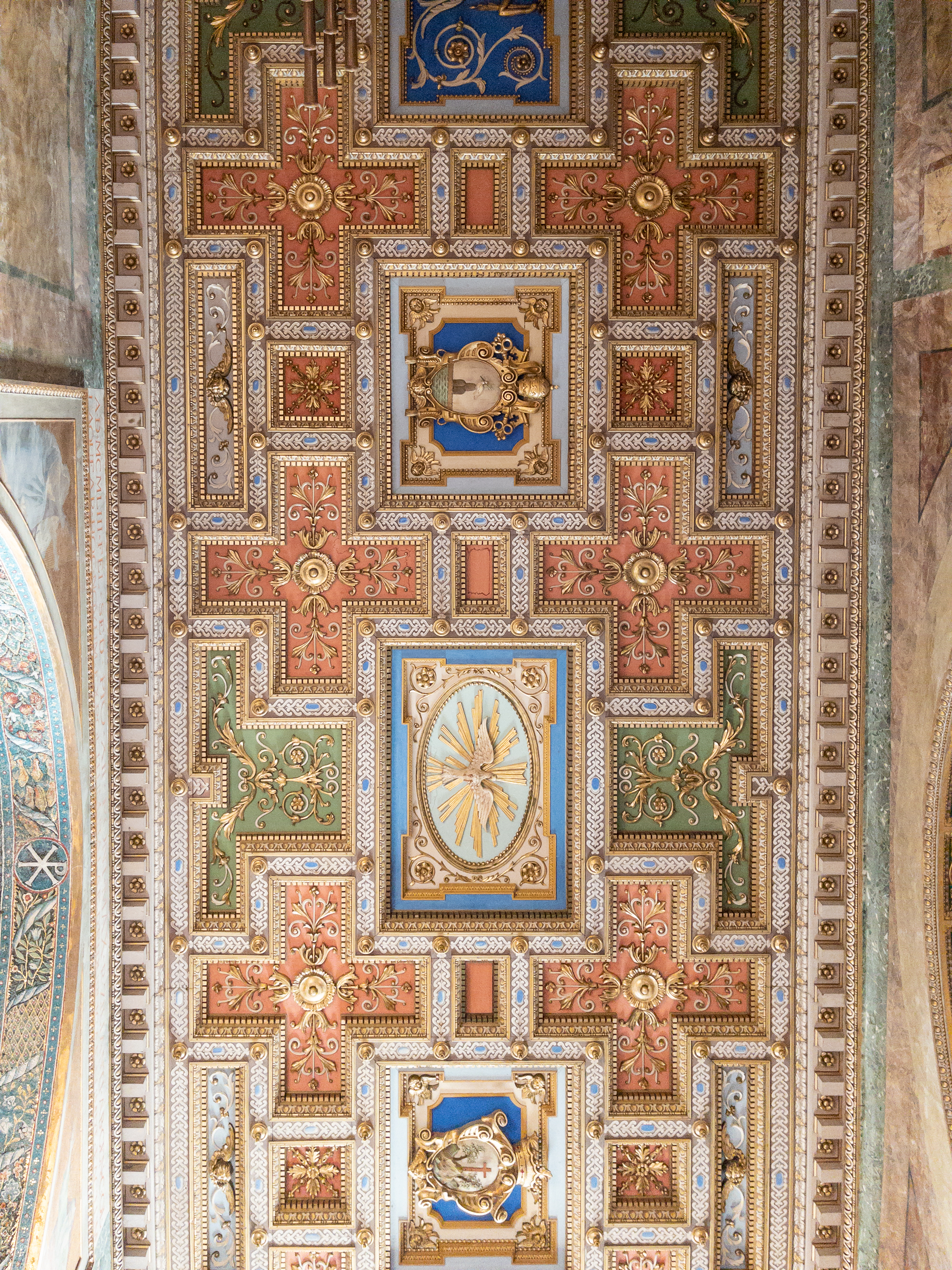
Coffered ceiling

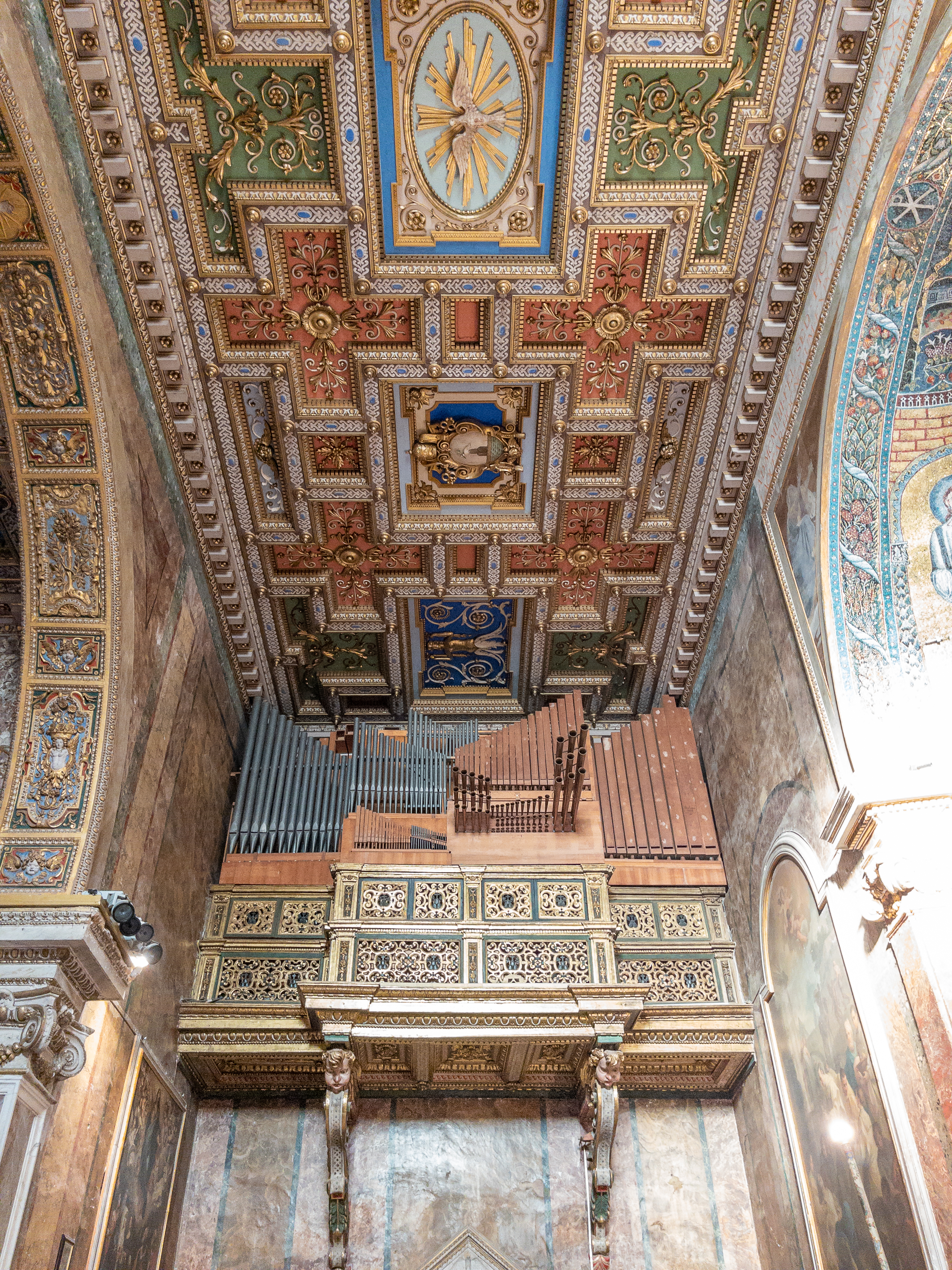
Coffered ceiling

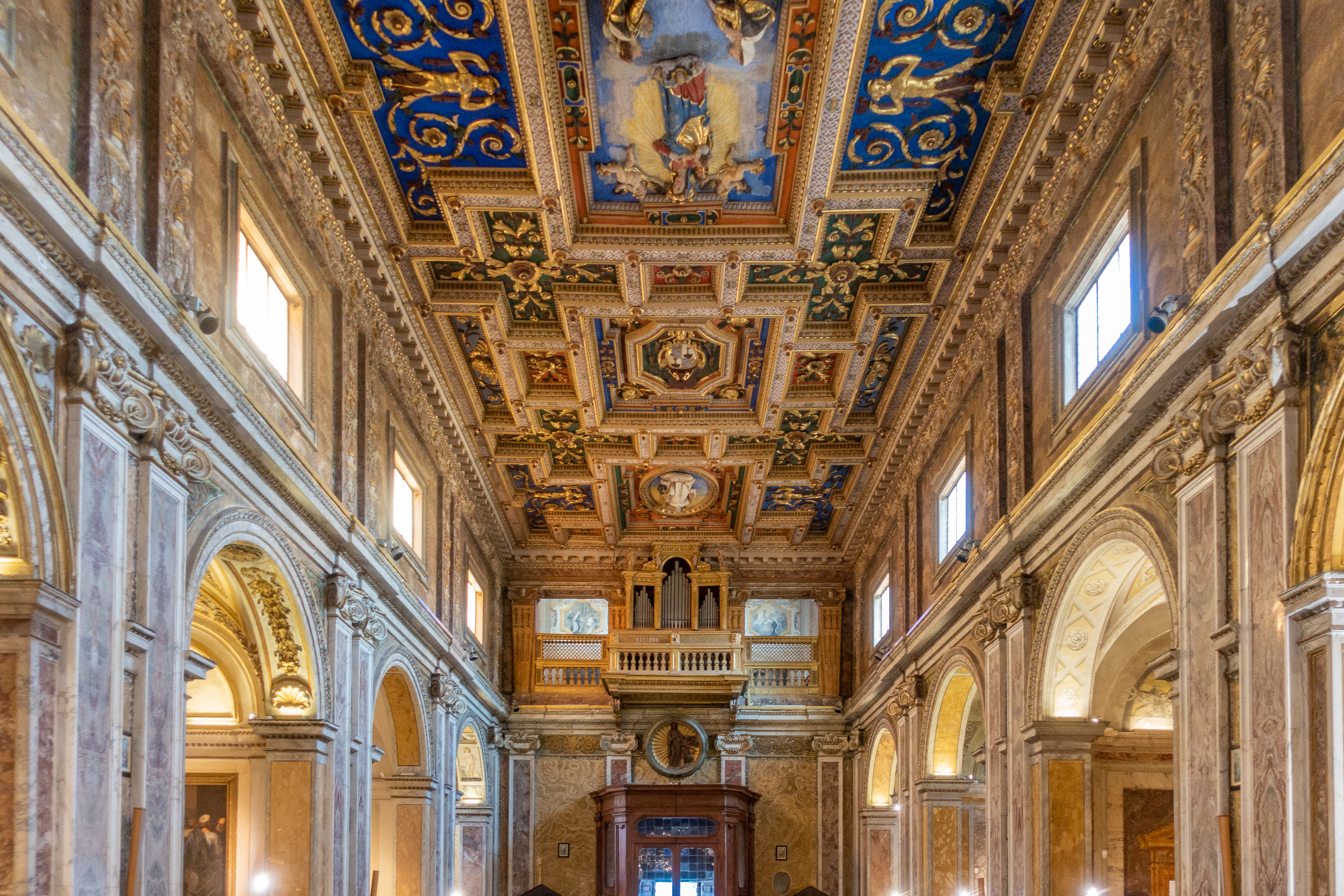
Nave

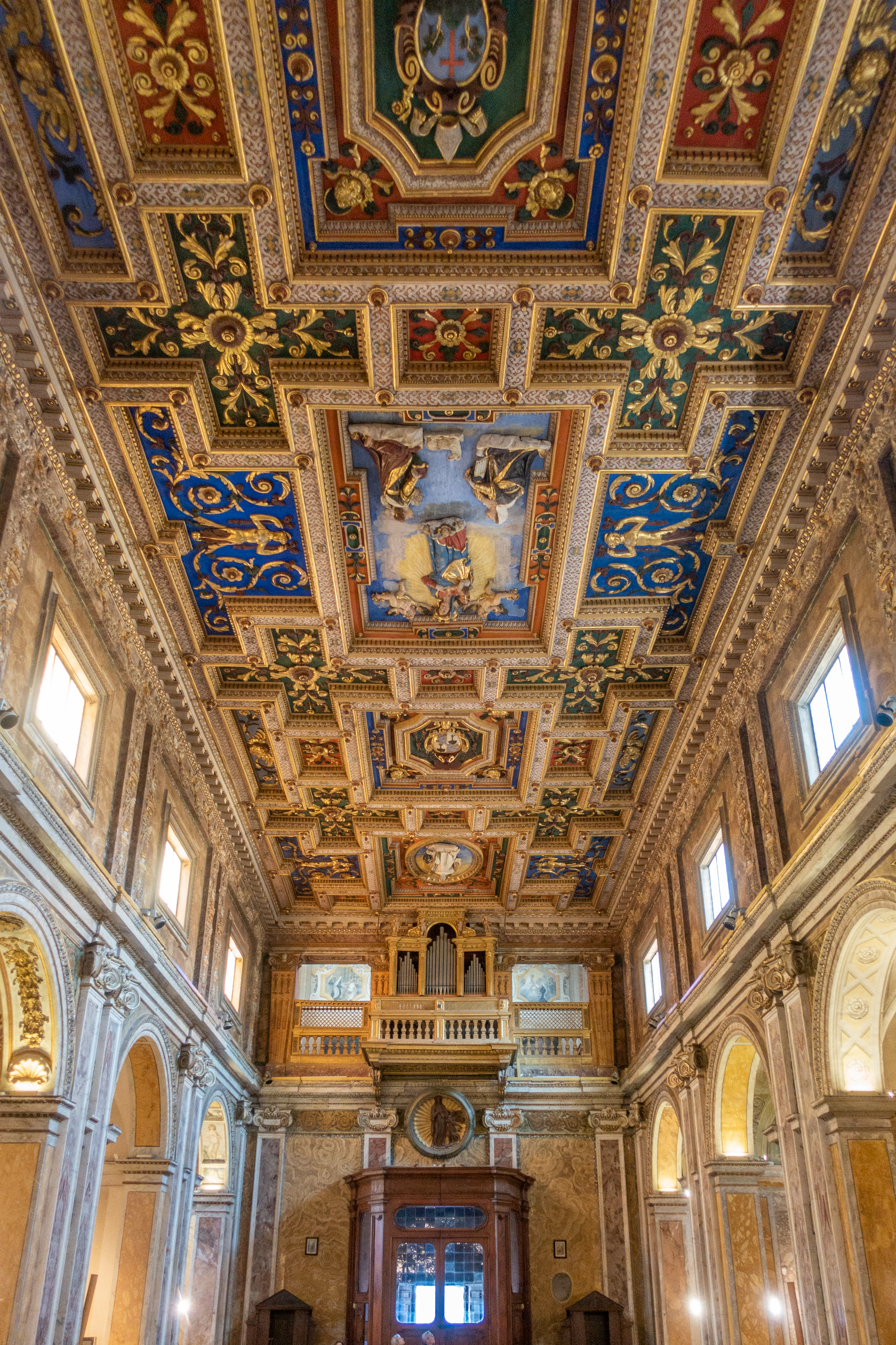
Nave

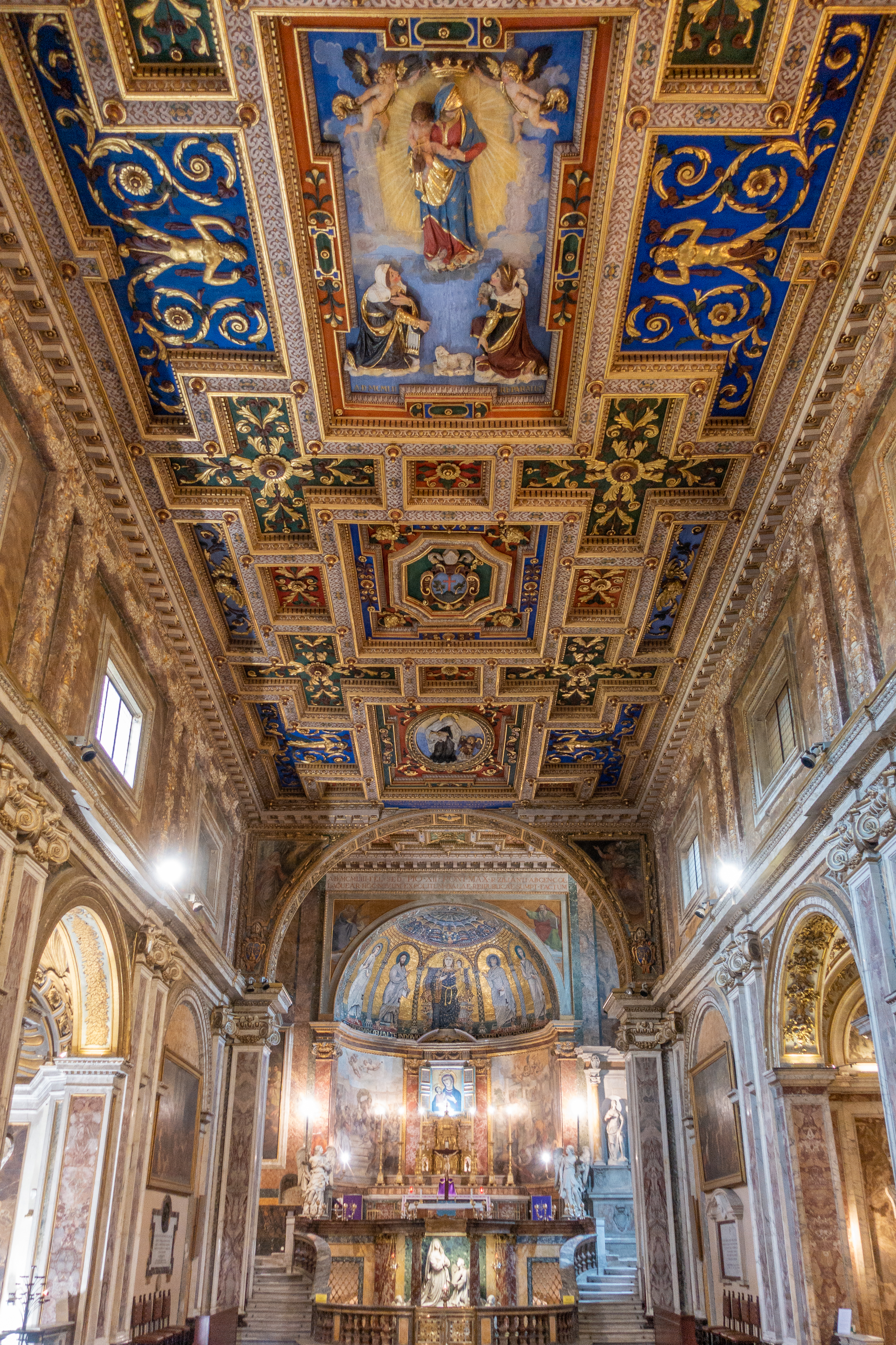
Nave

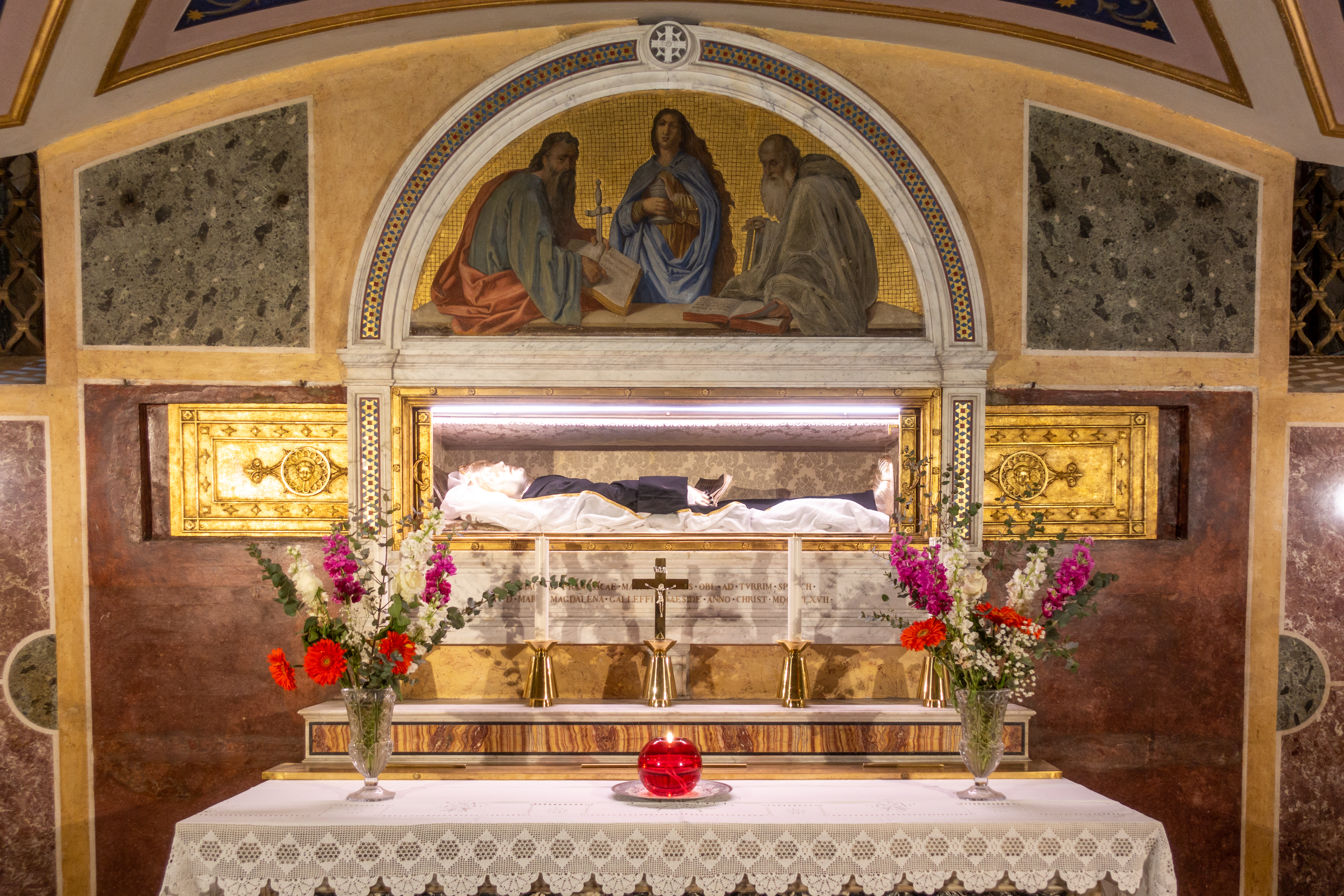
Body of St Frances of Rome

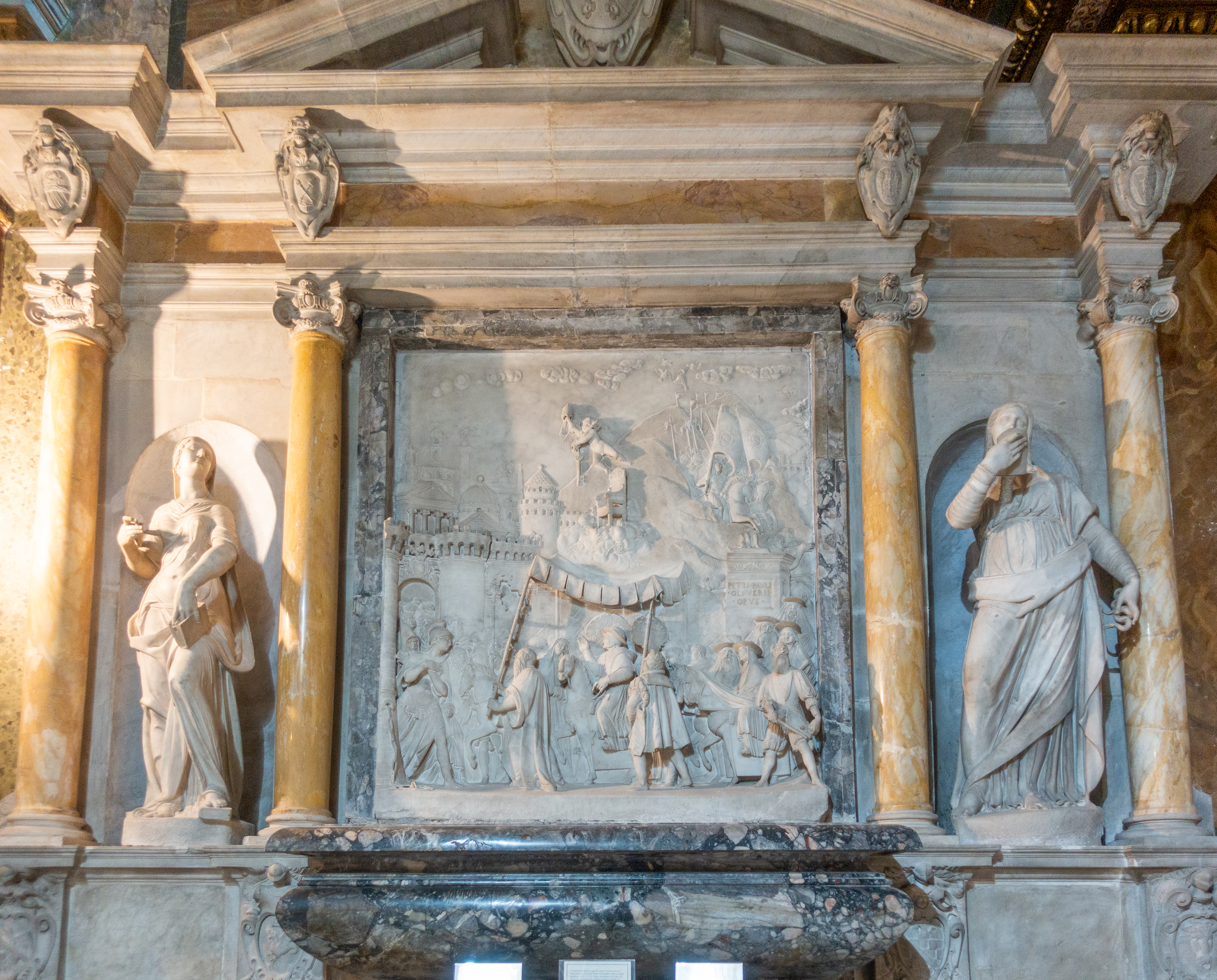
Tomb of Gregory XI

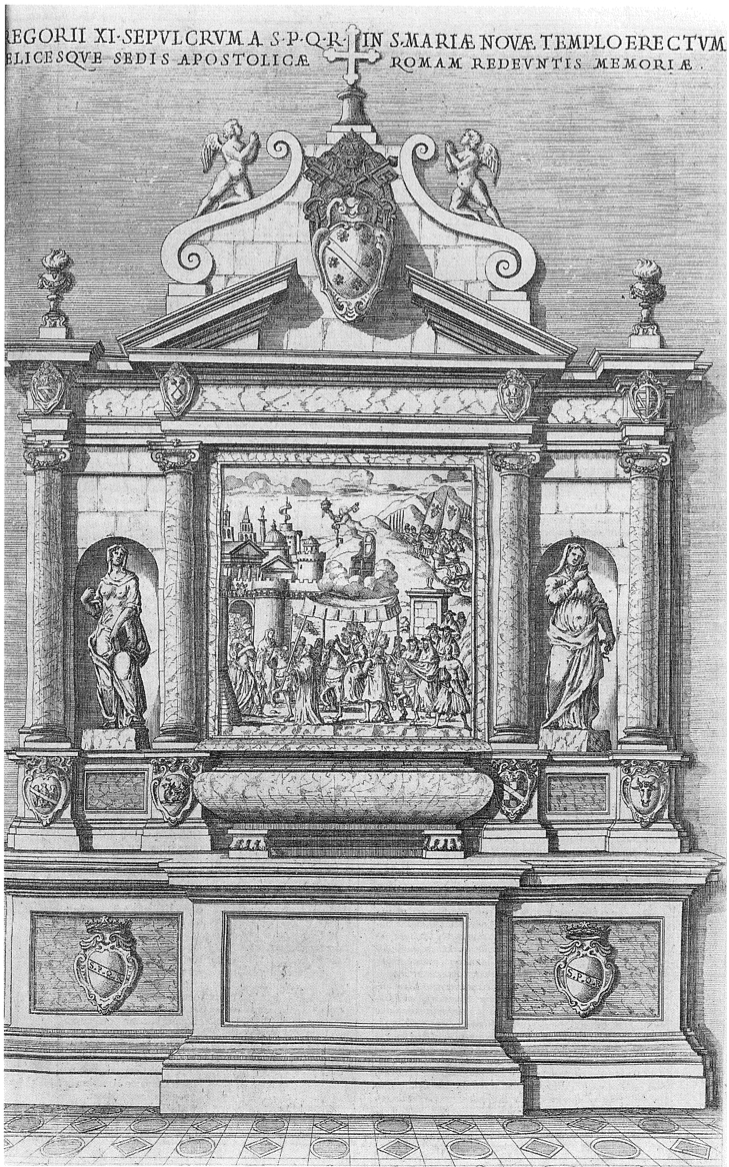
Tomb of Gregory XI

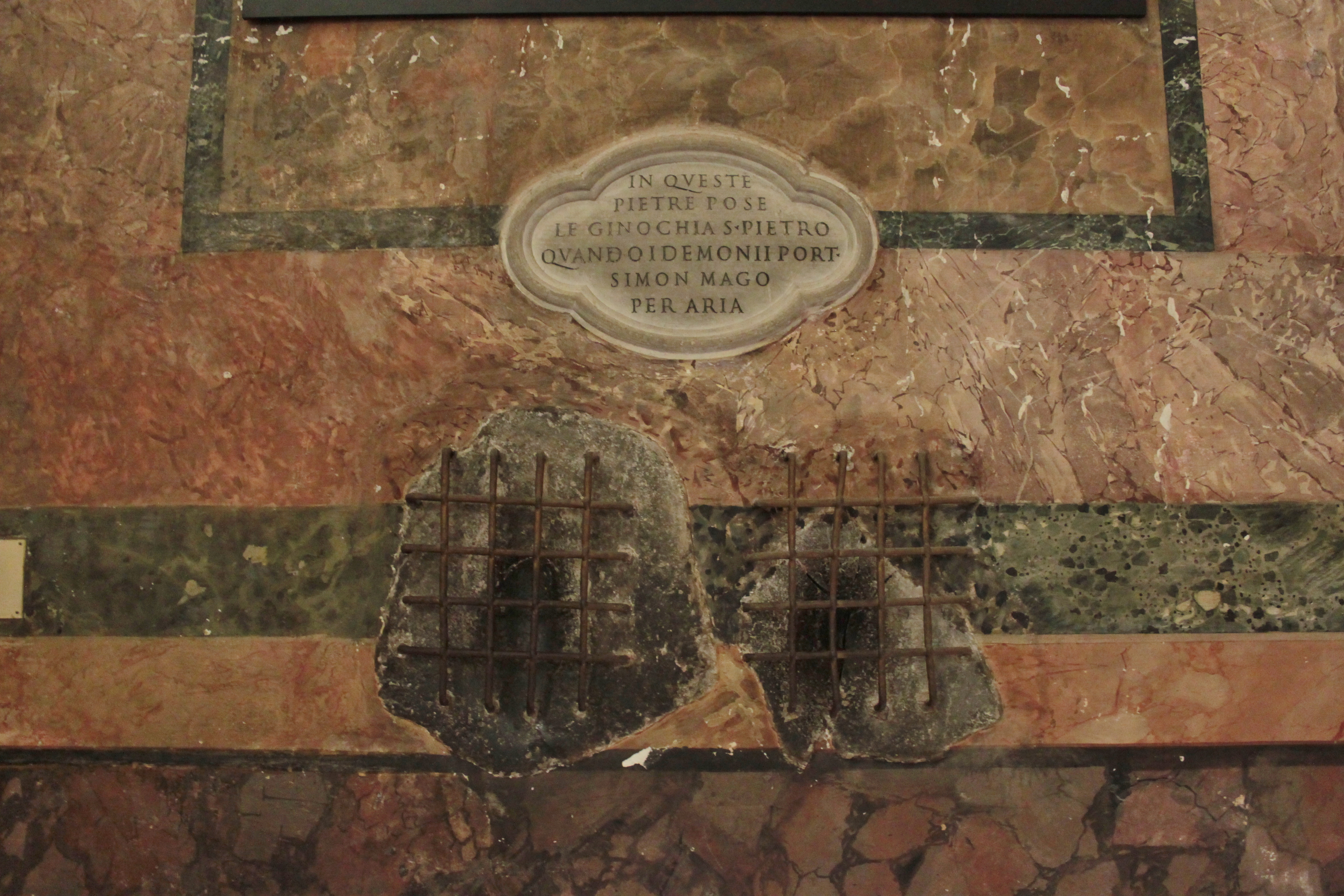
Stone where saint Peter knelt.

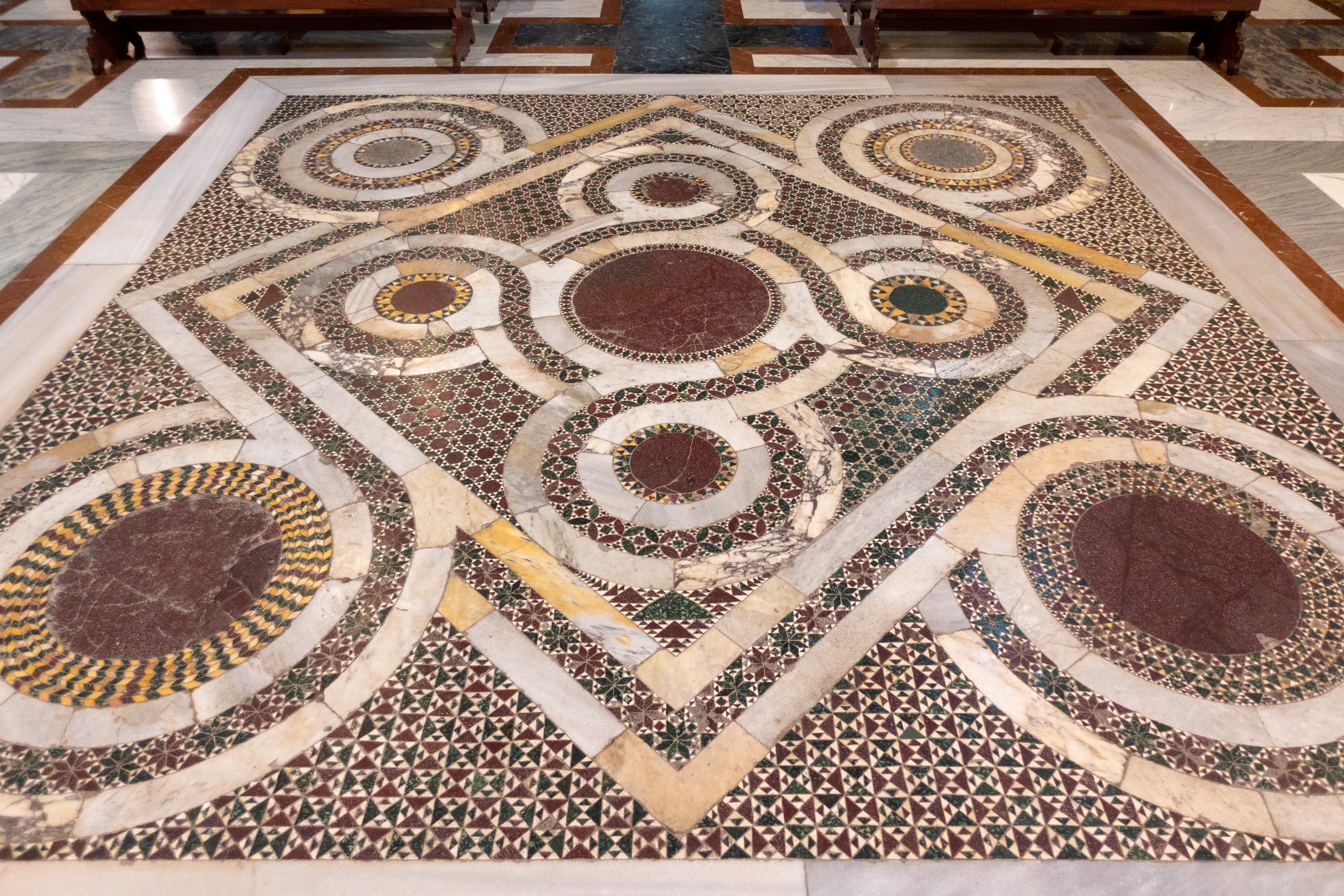
Cosmatesque floor

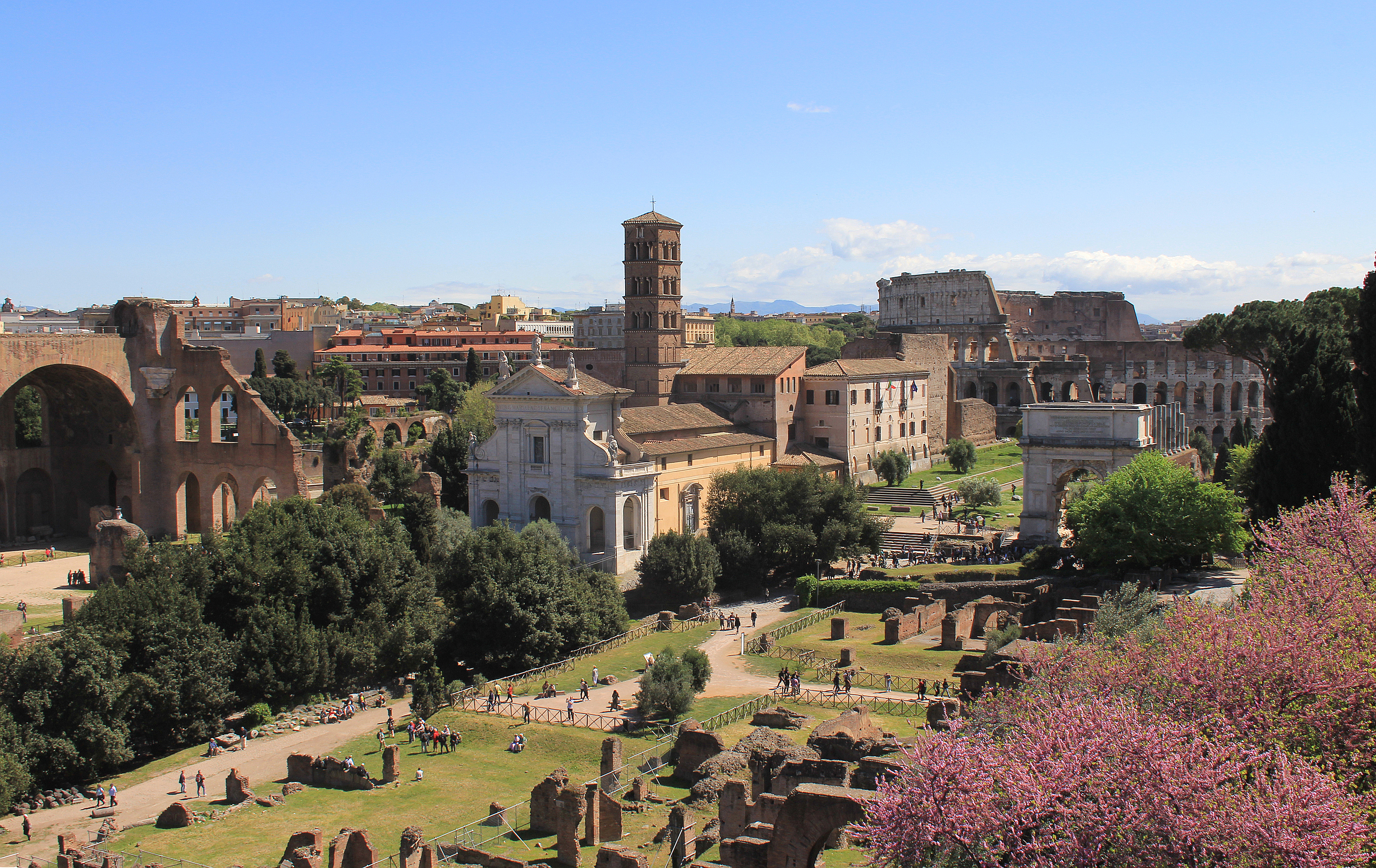
View from Palatine Hill

View from Palatine Hill

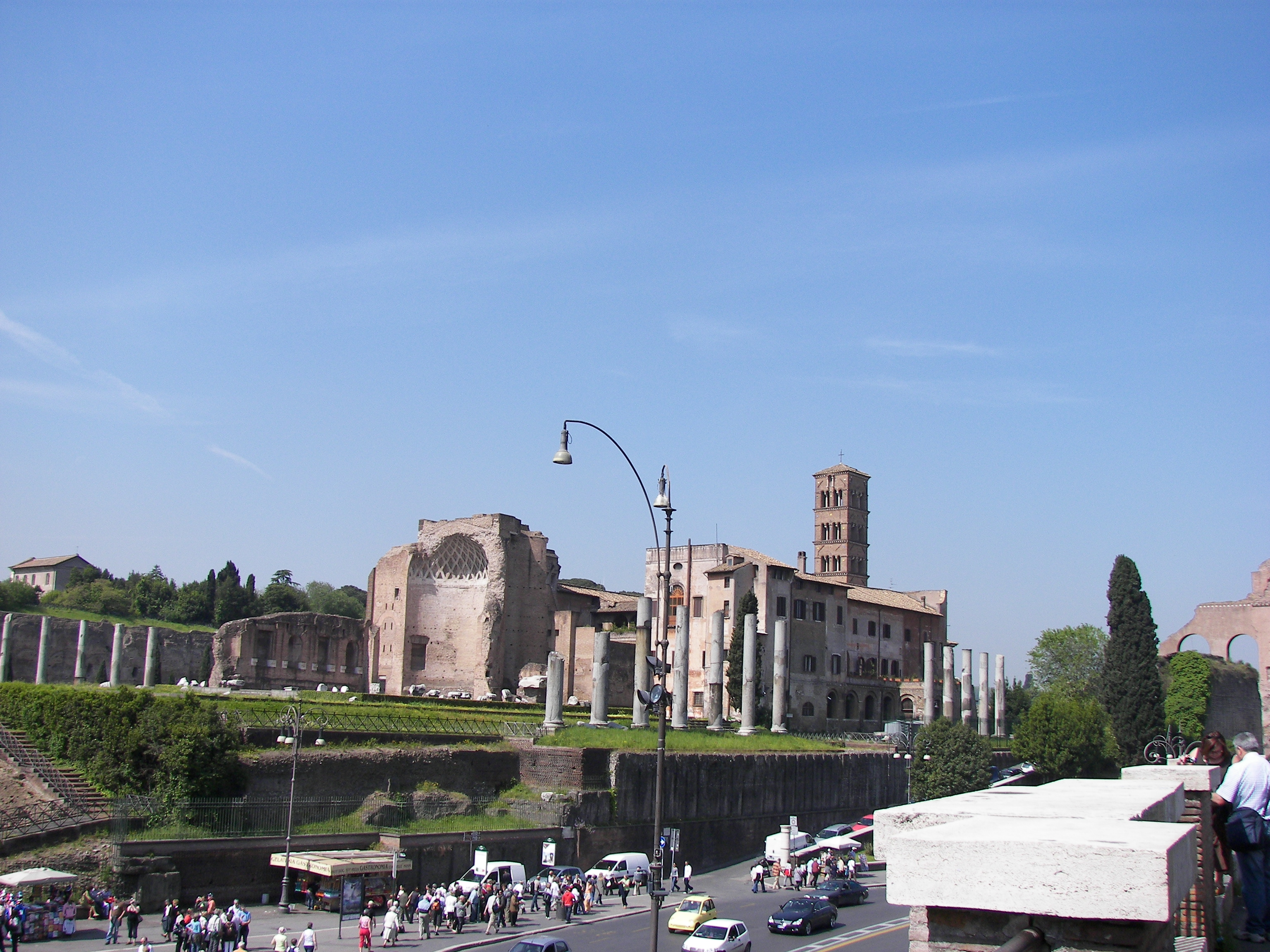
Olivetan monastery behind the apse and bell-tower with outer columns of the former Temple of Venus and Roma.

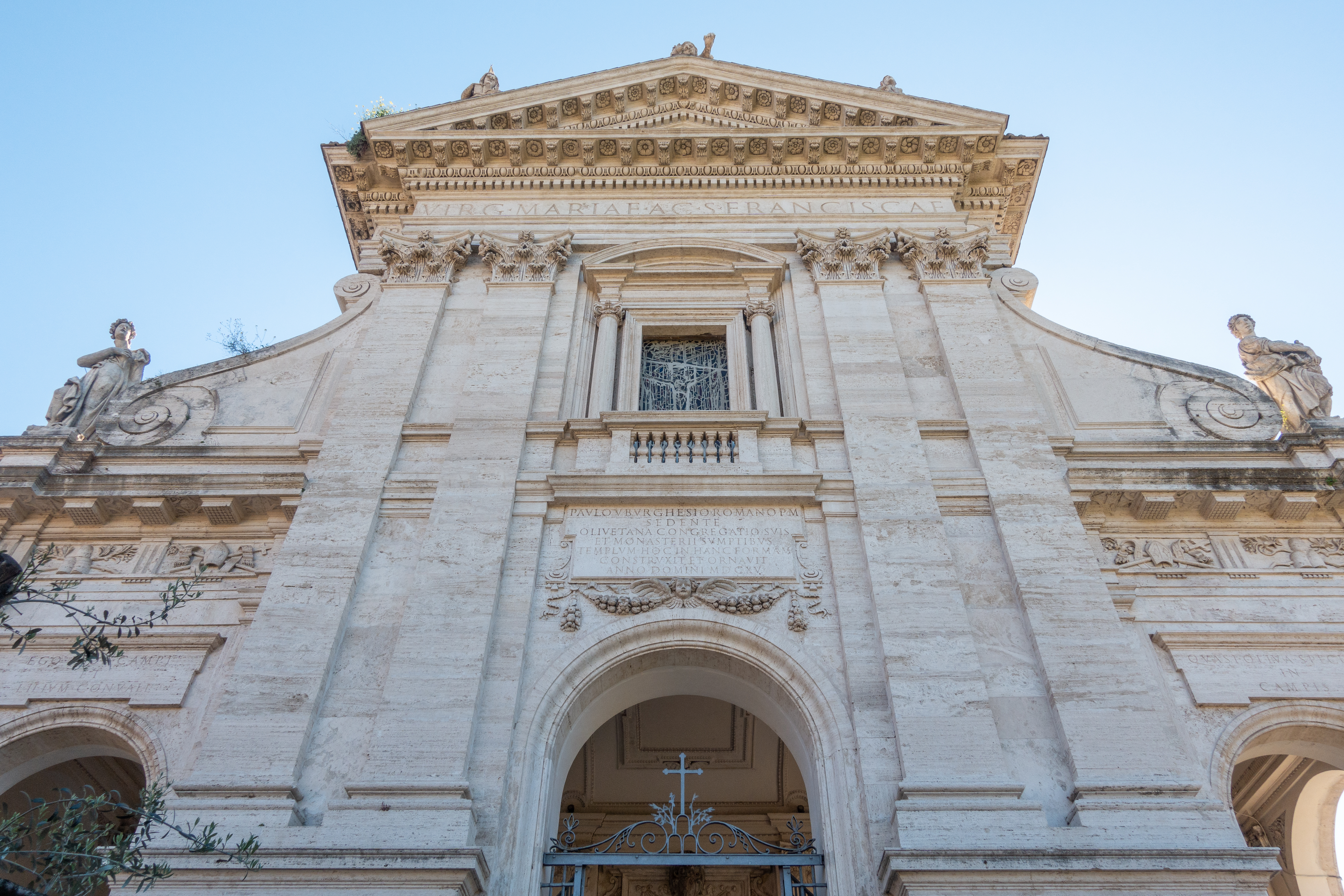
Facade

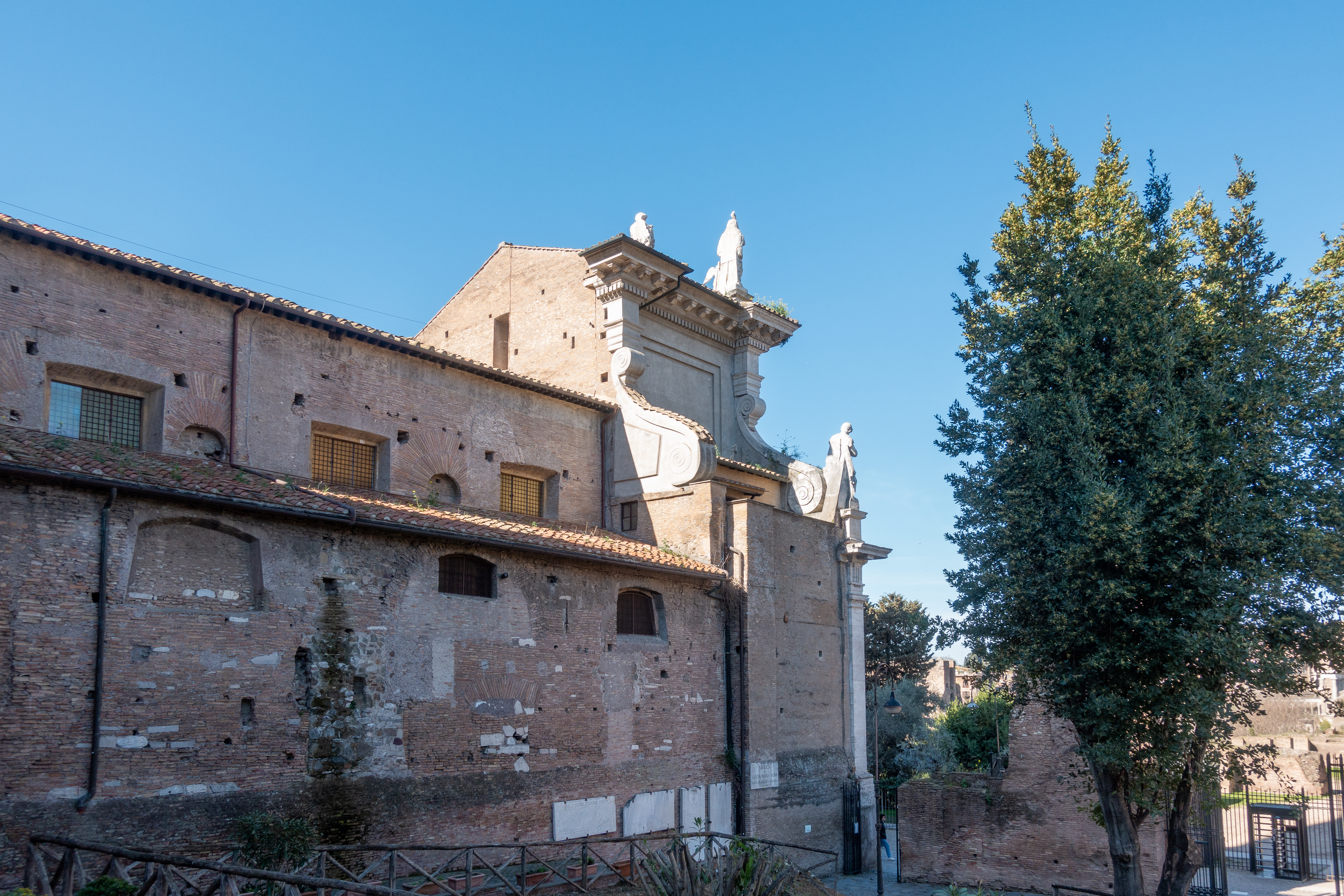
Exterior

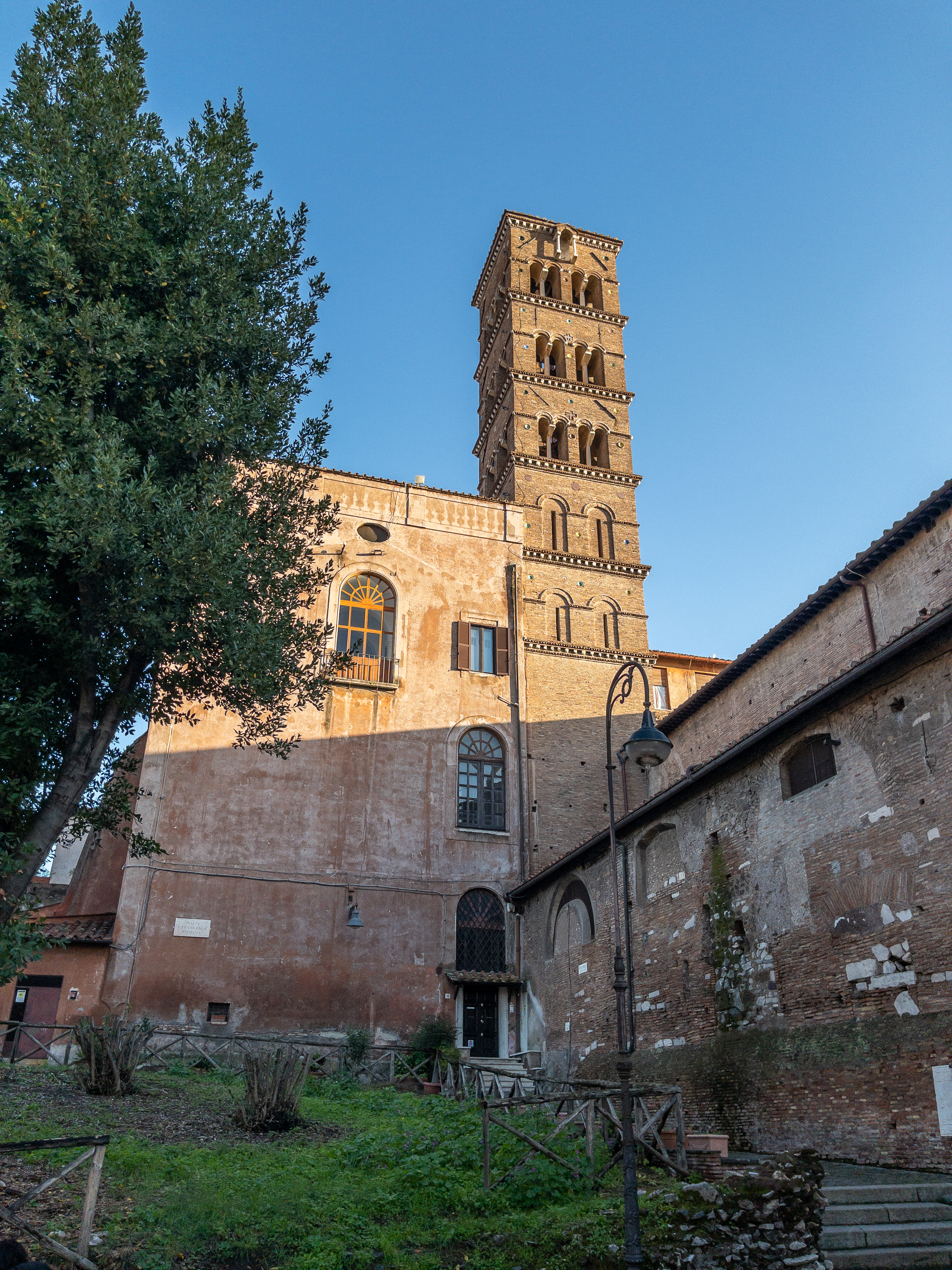
Bell tower

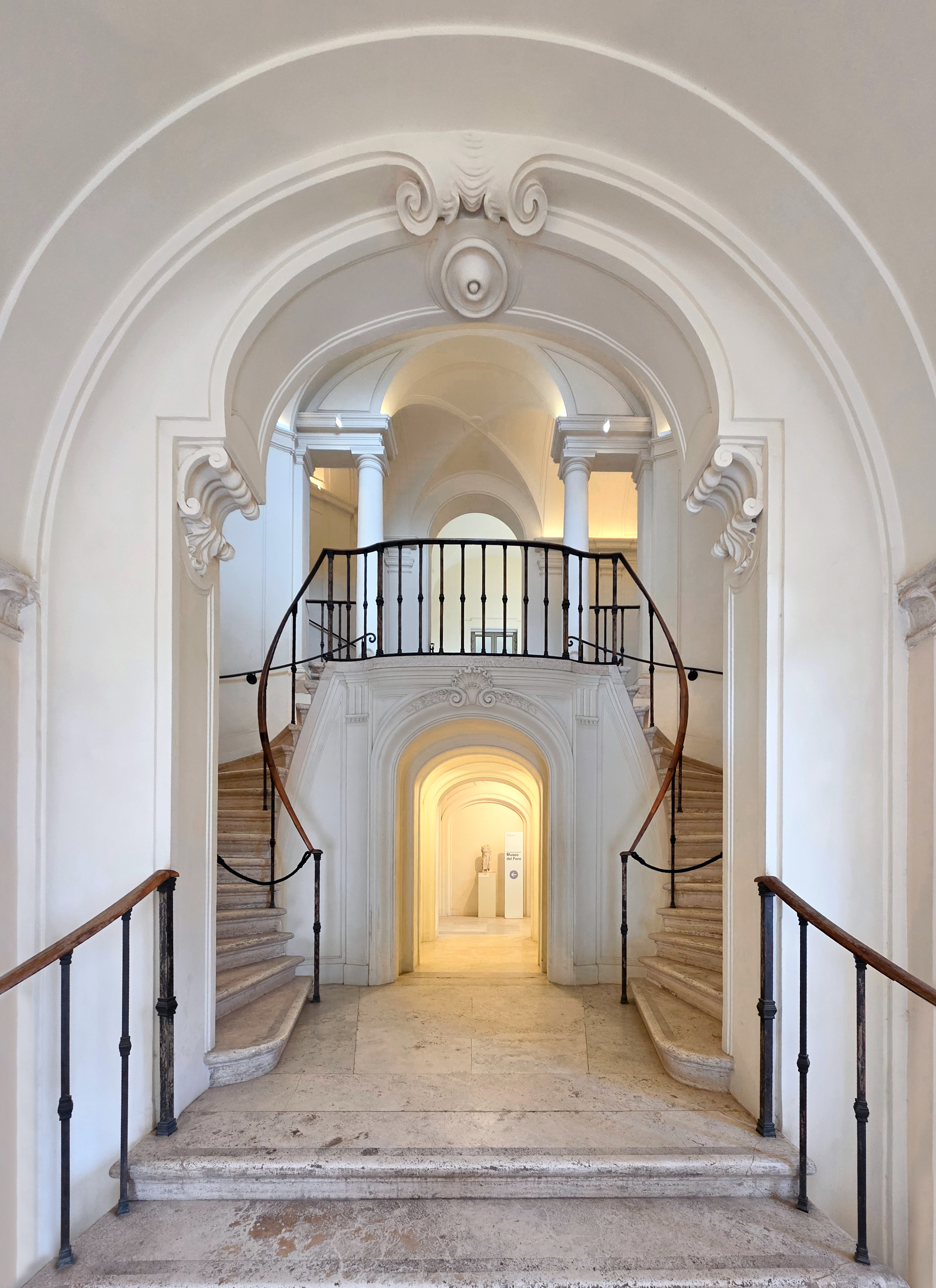
Baroque portal

== Bibliography ==
- Roma, Touring Club Italiano, 2004.
- Placido Lugano, S. Maria Nova (S. Francesca Romana) (Roma : Libreria Mantegazza, [1930?]).
- Elfriede Kartusch, Das Cardinalskollegium in der Zeit von 1181 bis 1227 (Wien 1948).
- P. Ronci, Basilica di Santa Maria Nova, Santa Francesca Romana al Foro Romano (Christen, 1973).
- H. W. Klewitz, Reformpapsttum und Kardinalkolleg (Darmstadt 1957).
- Barbara Zenker, Die Mitglieder des Kardinalkollegiums von 1130 bis 1159 (Würzburg 1964).
- R. Hüls, Kardinäle, Klerus und Kirchen Roms: 1049-1130 (Tübingen 1977).

Preceded by Sant'Eustachio	Landmarks of Rome; Santa Francesca Romana, Rome	Succeeded by San Giovanni a Porta Latina
