= Charles-Philippe Place =

French prelate

His Eminence Charles-Philippe Place
- Archbishop of Rennes
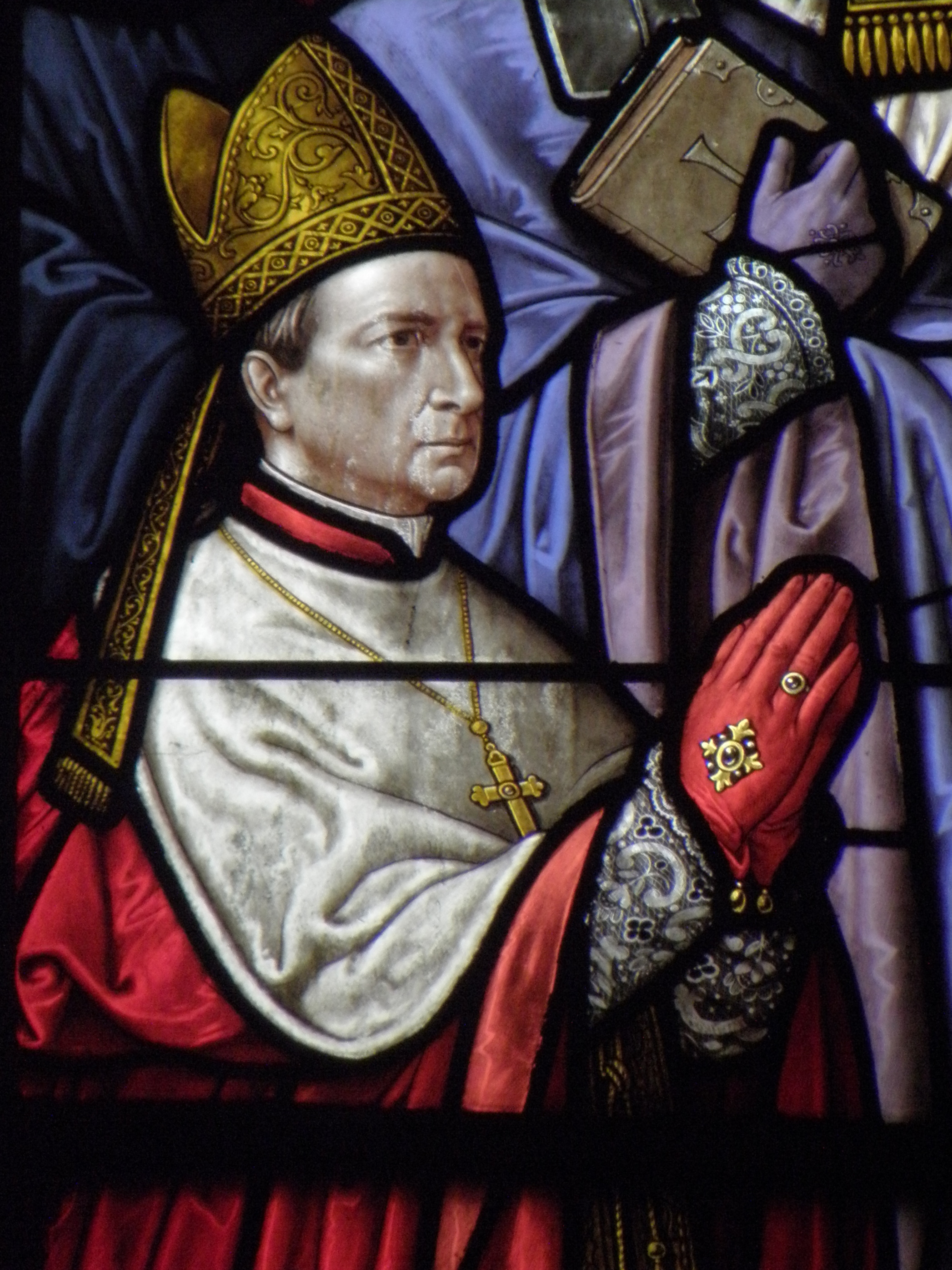
- Depiction in a stained glass window in the Saint-Pierre church in Bédée.
- Church: Roman Catholic Church
- Archdiocese: Rennes
- See: Rennes
- Appointed: 15 July 1878
- Installed: 10 October 1878
- Term ended: 5 March 1893
- Predecessor: Geoffroi Brossais Saint-Marc
- Successor: Jean-Natalis-François Gonindard
- Other post: Cardinal-Priest of Santa Maria Nuova (1887-93)
- Previous post: Bishop of Marseille (1866-78)

Orders
- Ordination: 30 March 1850 by Costantino Patrizi Naro
- Consecration: 26 August 1866 by Pope Pius IX
- Created cardinal: 7 June 1886 by Pope Leo XIII
- Rank: Cardinal-Priest

Personal details
- Born: Charles-Philippe Place; 14 February 1814 Paris, First French Empire
- Died: 5 March 1893 (aged 79) Rennes, French Third Republic
- Buried: Rennes Cathedral
- Parents: Philippe Place; Marie Lefèbvre d’Hervilliers
- Education: University of Paris; Roman College
- Motto: Tua voluntas Deus
- Coat of arms

Charles-Philippe Place (14 February 1814 – 5 March 1893) was a French prelate of the Catholic Church who was Bishop of Marseille from 1866 to 1878 and then Archbishop of Rennes from 1878 until his death in 1893. He was made a cardinal in 1886.

== Biography ==
Charles-Philippe Place was born on 14 February 1814 in Paris into a family of the industrial bourgeoisie. His brother Victor Place (1818-1875) was a diplomat and archeologist.

He studied at lycée Henri IV and the University of Paris, where he earned a doctorate in civil law in 1841. In 1846 he abandoned his legal career for theology studies at Collegio Romano. He was ordained a priest on 30 March 1850 by Cardinal Costantino Patrizi Naro, vicar of Rome.

He began his clerical career in the Diocese of Orleans, where he was named honorary canon of the cathedral chapter in July 1850. He became vicar general of the diocese and rector of its minor seminary. In Paris from 1856 to 1863, he was a chaplain and rector of the Minor Seminary of Notre-Dame-des-Champs. Upon the nomination of the government, he was named auditor of the Sacred Roman Rota in 1864 after being awarded a doctorate in civil and canon law by papal decree.

He was nominated bishop of Marseille by Emperor Napoléon III on 13 January 1866. The Holy See expressed reservations because of his reputation for Gallicanism, but Pope Pius IX named him bishop of Marseille on 22 June 1866 and consecrated him a bishop on 26 August 1866. Place worked to finish the construction of the Marseille cathedral and reorganized the diocesan finances.

He obtained his licentiate in theology at the Sorbonne University in 1868. At the First Vatican Council (1869-1870), he joined the minority that opposed the doctrine of papal infallibility, but then accepted the doctrine. The Holy See opposed his promotion to the see of Lyon in 1870. Upon the nomination of the French government, Pope Leo XIII appointed him Archbishop of Rennes on 15 July 1878.

Pope Leo XIII created him a cardinal priest on 7 June 1886 and he received his red biretta and the title of Santa Maria Nuova on 17 March 1887.

He died in Rennes on 5 March 1893. He was buried in the cathedral.
