= Auguste-René-Marie Dubourg =

French Cardinal

His Eminence Auguste-René-Marie Dubourg
- Archbishop of Rennes
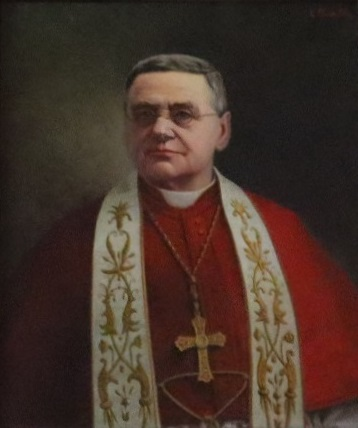
- Church: Roman Catholic Church
- Archdiocese: Rennes
- See: Rennes
- Appointed: 6 August 1906
- Term ended: 22 September 1921
- Predecessor: Joseph-Guillaume Labouré
- Successor: Alexis-Armand Charost
- Other post: Cardinal-Priest of Santa Balbina (1916-21)
- Previous post: Bishop of Moulins (1893-1906)

Orders
- Ordination: 22 December 1866
- Consecration: 16 April 1893 by Pierre-Marie-Frédéric Fallières
- Created cardinal: 4 December 1916 by Pope Benedict XV
- Rank: Cardinal-Priest

Personal details
- Born: Auguste-René-Marie Dubourg; 1 October 1842 Loguivy-Plougras, French Kingdom
- Died: 22 September 1921 (aged 78) Rennes, French Third Republic
- Buried: Rennes Cathedral
- Motto: Per Matrem ad cor Filii
- Coat of arms

Styles of Auguste Dubourg
- Reference style: His Eminence
- Spoken style: Your Eminence
- Informal style: Cardinal
- See: Rennes

Auguste-René-Marie Dubourg (1 October 1842—22 September 1921) was a French Cardinal of the Roman Catholic Church. He served as Archbishop of Rennes from 1906 until his death, and was elevated to the cardinalate in 1916.

== Biography ==
Auguste Dubourg was born in Loguivy-Plougrasto two inn-keepers and studied at the seminary in Saint-Brieuc before being ordained to the priesthood on 22 December 1866. He then taught at the Minor Seminary of Saint-Brieuc, and served as secretary of the episcopal curia, vicar general, and vicar capitular of Saint-Brieuc.

On 19 January 1893, Dubourg was appointed Bishop of Moulins by Pope Leo XIII. He received his episcopal consecration on the following 16 April from Bishop Pierre-Marie-Frédéric Fallières, with Bishops François-Marie Trégaro and Etienne-Marie Potron, OFM, serving as co-consecrators, in Saint-Brieuc Cathedral.

Dubourg was later promoted to Archbishop of Rennes on 6 August 1906. Pope Benedict XV created him Cardinal Priest of S. Balbina in the consistory of 4 December 1916.

The Cardinal died in Rennes, at age 79. He is buried in the metropolitan cathedral of Rennes.

Catholic Church titles
Preceded by Pierre-Simon-Louis-Marie de Dreux-Brézé	Bishop of Moulins; 1893–1906	Succeeded by Emile-Louis-Cornil Lobbedey
Preceded by Guillaume-Marie-Joseph Labouré	Archbishop of Rennes; 1906–1921	Succeeded by Alexis-Armand Charost
