= Guillaume-Marie-Joseph Labouré =

French archbishop and cardinal

His Eminence Guillaume-Marie-Joseph Labouré
- Archbishop of Rennes
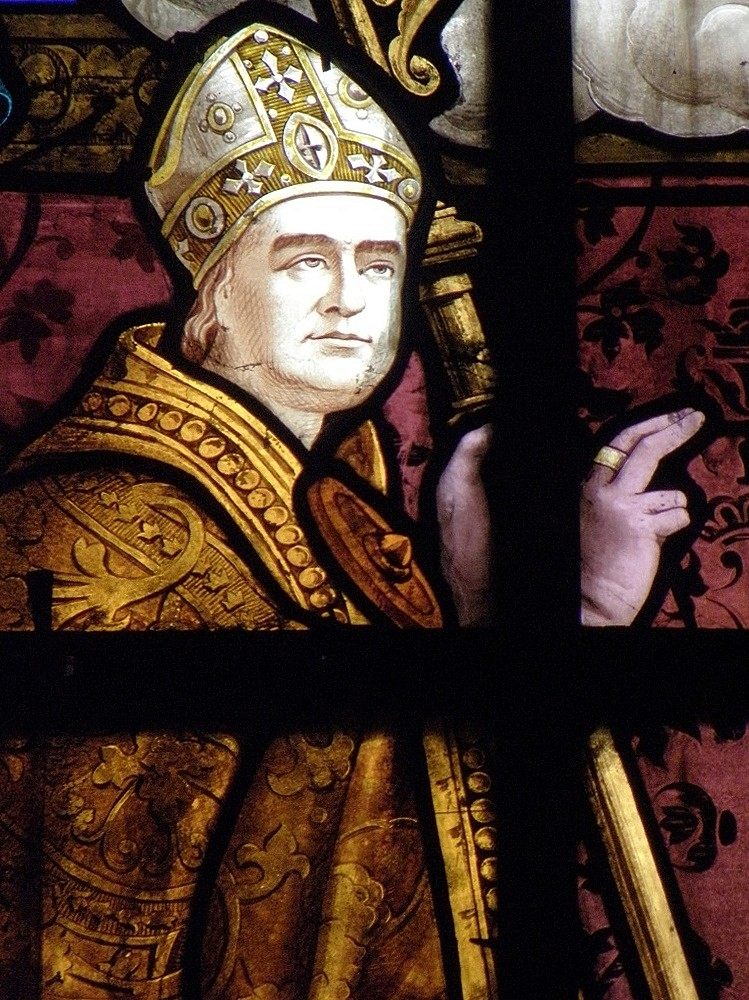
- Church: Roman Catholic Church
- Archdiocese: Rennes
- See: Rennes
- Appointed: 15 June 1893
- Term ended: 21 April 1906
- Predecessor: Jean-Natalis-François Gonindard
- Successor: Auguste-René-Marie Dubourg
- Other post: Cardinal-Priest of Santa Maria Nuova (1898-1906)
- Previous post: Bishop of Le Mans (1885-93)

Orders
- Ordination: 23 September 1865 by Pierre-Louis Parisis
- Consecration: 31 May 1885 by Guillaume-René Meignan
- Created cardinal: 19 April 1897 by Pope Leo XIII
- Rank: Cardinal-Priest

Personal details
- Born: Guillaume-Marie-Joseph Labouré; 27 October 1841 Achiet-le-Petit, Sud-Artois, Bapaume, Pas-de-Calais, Kingdom of France
- Died: 21 April 1906 (aged 64) Rennes, French Third Republic
- Buried: Rennes Cathedral
- Parents: Adrien Joseph Philippe Labouré; Marcelline Victoire Jessus
- Motto: Crux spes unica
- Coat of arms

Styles of Guillaume Labouré
- Reference style: His Eminence
- Spoken style: Your Eminence
- Informal style: Cardinal
- See: Rennes

Guillaume-Marie-Joseph Labouré (27 October 1841 – 21 April 1906) was a French archbishop and cardinal.

== Biography ==
Born in Achiet-le-Petit, he studied at Saint-Sulpice Seminary in Paris and was ordained to the priesthood on 23 September 1865. In the Diocese of Arras, he served as a professor and superior of its minor seminary and also vicar general.

On 27 March 1885 he was appointed Bishop of Le Mans by Pope Leo XIII. He received his episcopal consecration on the following 31 May from Archbishop Guillaume Meignan, with Bishops Clovis Catteau and Désire Donnel serving as co-consecrators. He was promoted to the Archdiocese of Rennes on 15 June 1893 and named an Assistant at the Pontifical Throne on 26 June 1896.

Leo XIII created him Cardinal Priest of S. Maria Nuova e S. Francesca in Foro Romano in the consistory of 19 April 1897. He participated in the papal conclave of 1903, which elected Pope Pius X.

During a time of opposition between the French Republic and the Church, he took a stance of appeasement.

He died in Rennes and was buried in the cathedral there.

Catholic Church titles
Preceded by Hector-Albert Chaulet d'Outremont	Bishop of Le Mans; 1884–1893	Succeeded by Charles-Joseph-Louis-Abel Gilbert
Preceded by Jean-Natalis-François Gonindard	Archbishop of Rennes; 1893–1906	Succeeded by Auguste-René-Marie Dubourg
