= Archdiocese of Rennes, Dol and Saint-Malo =

Diocese in western France

Coordinates: 48.11°N 1.68°W

Archdiocese of Rennes, Dol, and Saint-Malo Archidioecesis Rhedonensis, Dolensis et Sancti Maclovii Archidiocèse de Rennes, Dol et Saint-Malo Arc'heskopti Roazhon, Dol ha Sant-Maloù

Catholic
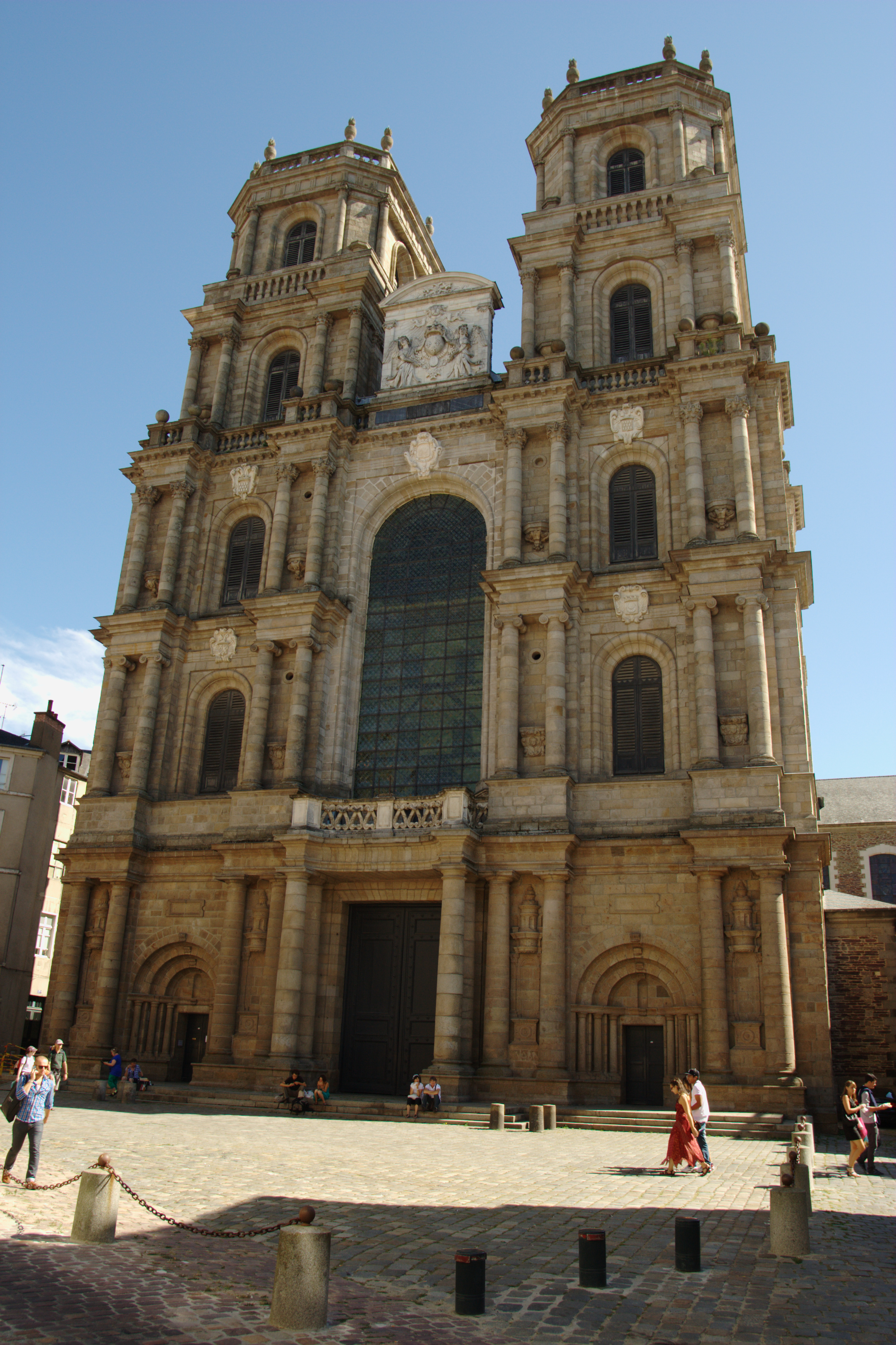
- Rennes Cathedral

Location
- Country: France
- Ecclesiastical province: Rennes

Statistics
- Area: 6,775 km^{2} (2,616 sq mi)
- Population: Total; Catholics: (as of 2022); 1,078,000 (est.) ▲; 873,000 (est.) ▲
- Parishes: 74 'new parishes'

Information
- Denomination: Roman Catholic
- Sui iuris church: Latin Church
- Rite: Roman Rite
- Established: 3rd Century (as Diocese); 3 January 1859 (as Archdiocese); 13 February 1880 (United)
- Cathedral: Cathedral of St. Peter in Rennes
- Patron saint: Saint Peter
- Secular priests: 227 (diocesan)▼36 (Religious Orders)▲52 Permanent Deacons

Current leadership
- Pope: Leo XIV
- Metropolitan Archbishop: Pierre d'Ornellas
- Auxiliary Bishops: Jean Bondu

Map
- Archdiocese of Rennes

Website
- Website of the Archdiocese

Ecclesiastical province of Rennes

The Archdiocese of Rennes, Dol, and Saint-Malo (Latin: Archidioecesis Rhedonensis, Dolensis et Sancti Maclovii; French: Archidiocèse de Rennes, Dol et Saint-Malo; Breton: Arc'heskopti Roazhon, Dol ha Sant-Maloù) is a Latin Church diocese of the Catholic Church in France. The diocese is coextensive with the department of Ille-et-Vilaine. The Archdiocese has 8 suffragans: the Diocese of Angers, the Diocese of Laval, the Diocese of Le Mans, the Diocese of Luçon, the Diocese of Nantes, the Diocese of Quimper and Léon, the Diocese of Saint-Brieuc and Tréguier, and the Diocese of Vannes.

The Concordat of 1802 re-established the Diocese of Rennes which since then has included: the ancient Diocese of Rennes with the exception of three parishes given to the Diocese of Nantes; the greater part of the ancient Diocese of Dol; the greater part of the ancient Diocese of St. Malo; ten parishes that had formed part of the ancient Diocese of Vannes and Nantes. On 3 January 1859, the See of Rennes, which the French Revolution had desired to make a metropolitan, became an archiepiscopal see, with the Diocese of Quimper and Léon, Diocese of Vannes, and Diocese of St. Brieuc as suffragans. Cardinal Charles-Philippe Place obtained from Pope Leo XIII permission for the Archbishop of Rennes to add the titles of Dol and St. Malo to that of Rennes.

In 2022, in the Archdiocese of Rennes, Dol, and Saint-Malo there was one priest for every 3,319 Catholics.

== History ==
=== Early period ===
Tradition names as first apostles of the future Diocese of Rennes, but of an uncertain date: Saint Maximinus, who was reported to have been a disciple and friend of Saint Paul (died AD 65), Saint Clarus, and Saint Justus. On the other hand, when in the fifth and sixth centuries bands of Christian Britons emigrated from Great Britain to Armorica and formed on its northern coast the small Kingdom of Domnonée, the Gospel was preached for the first time in the future Diocese of Dol and Diocese of Aleth. Among these missionaries were St. Armel, who, according to the legend, founded in the sixth century the town of Ploermel in the Diocese of Vannes and then retired into the forests of Chateaugiron and Janzé and attacked Druidism on the very site of the Dolmen of the Fairy Rocks (La Roche aux Fées); St. Méen (Mevennus) who retired to the solitudes around Pontrecoët and founded the monastery of Gael (550), known afterwards as St. Méen's; and St. Samson and St. Malo.

The earliest historical reference to the See of Rennes dates from 453. An assembly of eight bishops of Provincia Lugdunensis Tertia took place at Angers on 4 October 453 to consecrate a new bishop for Angers. Four of the bishops can be associated with particular Sees. The other four are assigned by scholars to the other dioceses in the ecclesiastical province, one of which was Rennes. One of the four prelates, Sarmatio, Chariato, Rumoridus, and Viventius, was Bishop of Rennes. This bishop's successor, likely his immediate successor, Athenius, took part in the Council of Tours in 461. Louis Duchesne is of opinion that the St. Amandus reckoned by some scholars among the bishops of Rennes at the end of the fifth century is the same as St. Amand of Rodez. He therefore excludes him from his list of authentic bishops.

=== Medieval Rennes ===
In 1180 Bishop Philippe, acting in accordance with a dream (it is said), began the replacement of the old cathedral with a new edifice; the eastern part of the building was erected, but various delays hampered the completion of the whole structure. The ceremony of consecration did not take place until 3 November 1359, though the edifice was still uncompleted. A new cathedral which had been built and dedicated to Saint Peter in 1541 was demolished in 1755 and replaced by the current edifice.

The Chapter of the Cathedral of Saint-Pierre was composed of five dignities and sixteen Canons, and sixteen prebends. The dignities were: the Archdeacon of Rennes, the Archdeacon of Le Désert (de Deserto), the Cantor, the Succentor, and the Treasurer. The royal pouillé of 1648 names six dignities, omitting the Succentor and adding the Theologian and Penitentiary. The Treasurer was presented by the Pope. The Chapter, and all the cathedral chapters in France, were suppressed by the Constituent Assembly in 1790.

The diocese also contained three Collegiate Churches which had Canons: La Guerche (founded 1206), Vitré (also founded in 1206), and Champeau (mid-15th cent.). Notre-Dame de Guerche had twelve Canons and prebends, S. Marie Madeleine at Vitry had twenty-two Canons, headed by their Treasurer. Notre-Dame de Champeau had six Canons and prebends, and were headed by a Dean.

In the Middle Ages, the Bishop of Rennes had the role of crowning the dukes of Brittany in his cathedral. On the occasion of his first entry into Rennes it was customary for him to be borne on the shoulders of four Breton barons.

=== Later developments ===
In accordance with the terms of the Concordat of Bologna of 1516, between King Francis I of France and Pope Leo X all bishops in France (which at the time did not include "the Three Bishoprics", Metz, Toul and Verdun) were to be nominated by the King and approved (preconized) by the Pope. This was continued under Napoleon by the terms of the Concordat of 1801 and by the Bourbon monarchs and their successors to 1905 by the Concordat of 1817. The practice did not apply during the French Revolution, when the Civil Constitution of the Clergy mandated the election of bishops by qualified electors in each of the new départements of the republic. These 'Constitutional Bishops' were in schism with the Papacy. Therefore, nearly all Archbishops of Rennes from 1516 to 1905 were nominees of the French government. In addition to the nomination of the Bishop of Rennes, the king also held the nomination of the Abbey of Saint-Mélaine (O.S.B.), the Abbey of Saint-Pierre de Rillé (O.S.A.), the Abbey of Saint-Georges-de-Rennes aux Nonnains (O.S.B.), and the Abbey of Saint-Sulpice aux Nonnains (O.S.B.).

Pope Francis has noted that in the seventeenth century, the Diocese of Rennes was the first diocese to institute a feast dedicated to the Sacred Heart of Jesus. St. John Eudes (1601-1680) played a pivotal role in influencing the Bishop of Rennes to institute this feast, marking a historic milestone in the Catholic Church

During the French Revolution Claude Le Coz (1760–1815), Principal of the Collège de Quimper, was elected Constitutional Bishop of Ille-et-Vilaine. Under the Concordat he became Archbishop of Besançon.

Noteworthy bishops of the diocese of Rennes are: Marbodus, the hymnographer (1035–1123); the Dominican Yves Mayeuc (1507–41); Arnaud d'Ossat (1596–1600), cardinal in 1599, and prominent in the conversion of Henry IV of France; Godefroy Brossais Saint Marc (1848–78), cardinal in 1875; Charles Place (1878–93), cardinal in 1886; and Guillaume Labouré (1893–1906), cardinal in 1897.

== See also ==
- Roman Catholic Diocese of Vannes

== Bishops and Archbishops of Rennes ==
=== To 1000 ===
...

- Athenius (attested 461)
- Melaine (attested 511)
- Fybediolus (attested 549)
- Victurius (attested 567)
- Haimoaldus (attested 614, 616)
- Rioterus (attested 650)
- Moderamnus ca. 715–720
- Wernarius (attested 843, 859)
- Electramnus (attested 866, 871)
- Nordoardus (attested 950)
- Tetbaldus (ca. 990–1020)

=== From 1000 to 1500 ===
- Gualterius
- Guarinus
- Triscanus
- Mainus (attested 1027).
- Sylvester de la Guerche (1070 – 1090).
- Marbodius (ca. 1096 – 11 September 1123).
- Roaldus ( ? – 21 November 1126).
- Hamelinus (15 May 1127 – 2 February 1141).
- Alanus (1141 – 1 May 1156)
- Stephanus de la Rochefoucald (1156 – 4 September 1166)
- Robert (1166 – 9 December 1167).
- Stephen de Fougères (1168–1178).
- Philippe (1179 – 1181)
- Jacques (1183 ?)
- Herbert: (by 1184 – 3 December 1198)
- Peter de Dinan (elected before August 1199 – 24 January 1210)
- Pierre de Fougères (1210 – 10 July 1222)
- Josselinus de Montauban (1222/1223 – 31 October 1235)
- Alain (ca. 1237 – before May 1239)
- Jean Gicquel: (1239 – 15 January 1258)
- Aegidius: (October 1258 – 26 September 1259)
- Maurice de Trelidi (Tresguidi): (by 1260 – 18 September 1282)
- Guillaume de la Roche-Tanguy : (1282 – September 1297)
- Jean de Samesio (28 March 1298 – 3 February 1299)
- Aegidius Camelini: (11 February 1299 – ? )
- Ivo : (by 1304 – ca. 1307)
- Alain de Chateaugiron: (1311 – 13 April 1327)
- Guillaume Ouvroing: (18 May 1328 – 1345)
- Artaud, O.S.B. : (24 October 1347 – 1353?)
- Pierre de Valle: (15 April 1353 – 11 January 1357)
- Guillaume Poulart (or Gibon) : (Jun 1357 Appointed – Feb 1359 Appointed, Bishop of Saint-Malo)
- Pierre de Guémené: (14 January 1359 – 1362)
- Radulfus de Tréal: (16 January 1363 – 13 February 1383)
- Guillaume de Briz: (27 April 1384 – 27 August 1386) (Avignon Obedience)
- Antoine de Lovier: (27 August 1386 – 15 October 1389) (Avignon Obedience)
- Anselme de Chantemerle: (8 November 1389 – 1 September 1427) (Avignon Obedience)
- Guillaume Brillet: (26 September 1427 – 26 May 1447)
- Robert de la Riviere (26 May 1447 – 18 March 1450)
- Jacques d'Espinay-Durestal: (25 April 1450 – Oct 1481 Resigned)
- Michel Guibé: (1482 – 1502)

=== From 1500 to 1800 ===
- Robert Guibé: (1502 – 1507)
- Yvo de Mayeuc, O.P. (1507 – 1539)
- Claude de Dodieu (23 July 1539 – 4 April 1558)
- Bernardin Bochetel (Bouchelet) : (1558 – 1566)
- Bertrand de Marillac : (1565 – 29 May 1573)
- Aymar Hennequin: (3 July 1573 – 13 January 1596)
- Arnaud d'Ossat: (9 Sep 1596 Appointed – 26 Jun 1600 Appointed, Bishop of Bayeux)
- François l'Archiver: (17 June 1602 – 1619)
- Pierre Cornulier: (29 July 1619 – 1640)
- Henri de la Motte-Houdancourt (1640–1660)
- Charles François de Vieuville (1660–1676)
- François de Bouthilier-Chavigny: (1676–1679)
- Jean-Baptiste de Beaumanoir de Lavardin: (8 November 1677 – 23 May 1711)
- Christophe-Louis Turpin de Crissé de Sanzay: (15 Aug 1711 Appointed – 27 Sep 1724 Appointed, Bishop of Nantes)
- Charles-Louis-Auguste Le Tonnelier de Breteuil: (17 Oct 1723 Appointed – 24 Apr 1732 Died)
- Louis-Guy de Guérapin de Vauréal: ( 1732 Appointed – 1758 Resigned)
- Jean-Antoine de Toucheboeuf de Beaumont des Junies: ( 1758 Appointed – 1761 Resigned)
- Henri-Louis-René Des Nos: (16 Aug 1761 Ordained Bishop – 25 Dec 1769 Appointed, Bishop of Verdun)
- François Bareau de Girac: ( 1769 Appointed – 1801 Resigned)

=== Since 1800 ===
- Jean-Baptiste-Marie de Maillé de la Tour-Landry: (9 Apr 1802 – 25 Nov 1804)
- Etienne-Célestin Enoch: (30 Jan 1805 Appointed – 12 Nov 1819 Retired)
- Charles Mannay: (27 Nov 1819 Appointed – 5 Dec 1824 Died)

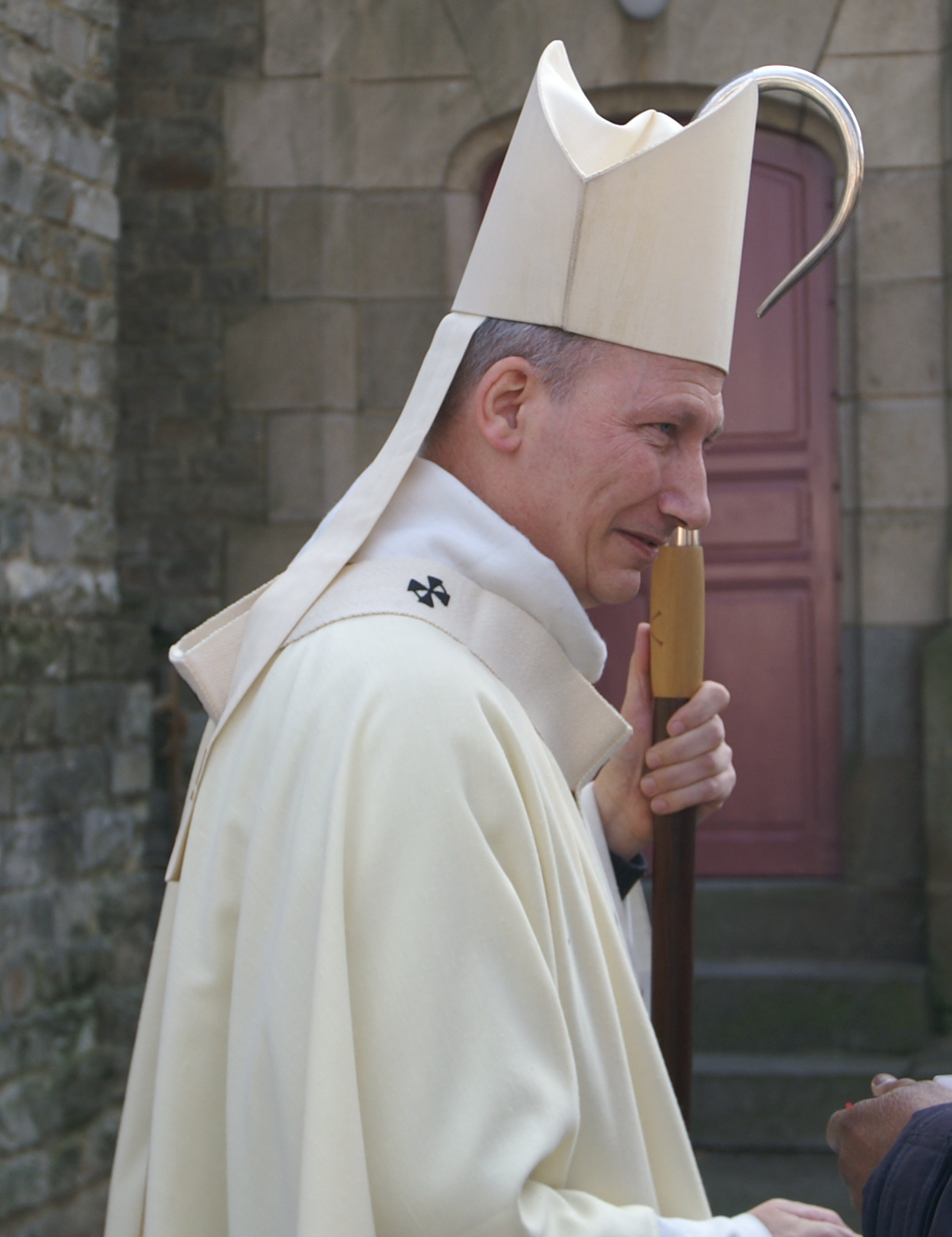
Archbishop Pierre d'Ornellas

- Claude-Louis de Lesquen: (12 Jan 1825 Appointed – 21 Jan 1841 Resigned)
- Geoffroy Brossais Saint-Marc: (25 Feb 1841 Appointed – 26 Feb 1878 Died)
- Charles-Philippe Place: (13 Jun 1878 Appointed – 5 Mar 1893 Died)
- Jean-Natalis-François Gonindard: (5 Mar 1893 Succeeded – 17 May 1893 Died)
- Guillaume-Marie-Joseph Labouré: (13 Jun 1893 Appointed – 21 Apr 1906 Died)
- Auguste-René-Marie Dubourg: (7 Aug 1906 Appointed – 22 Sep 1921)
- Alexis-Armand Charost † (22 Sep 1921 Succeeded – 7 Nov 1930 Died)
- René-Pierre Mignen † (21 Jul 1931 Appointed – 1 Nov 1939 Died)
- Clément-Emile Roques † (11 May 1940 Appointed – 4 Sep 1964 Died)
- Paul Joseph Marie Gouyon † (4 Sep 1964 Succeeded – 15 Oct 1985 Retired)
- Jacques André Marie Jullien † (15 Oct 1985 Succeeded – 1 Sep 1998 Resigned)
- François Saint-Macary † (1 Sep 1998 Succeeded – 26 Mar 2007 Died)
- Pierre d'Ornellas (26 Mar 2007 Succeeded – present)

== See also ==
- Ancient Diocese of Dol
- Ancient Diocese of Saint-Malo
- Catholic Church in France
- List of Catholic dioceses in France

== Sources ==
=== Reference works ===
- Pouillé général contenant les bénéfices de l'archevêché de Tours (in French). Paris: Gervais Alliot. 1648. (unpaginated, but ca. p. 635)
- Gams, Pius Bonifatius (1873). Series episcoporum Ecclesiae catholicae: quotquot innotuerunt a beato Petro apostolo. Ratisbon: Typis et Sumptibus Georgii Josephi Manz. (Use with caution; obsolete)
- Eubel, Conradus, ed. (1913). Hierarchia catholica (in Latin). Vol. 1 (Tomus I) (second ed.). Münster: Libreria Regensbergiana.
- Eubel, Conradus, ed. (1914). Hierarchia catholica (in Latin). Vol. 2 (Tomus II) (second ed.). Münster: Libreria Regensbergiana.
- Eubel, Conradus; Gulik, Guilelmus, eds. (1923). Hierarchia catholica (in Latin). Vol. 3 (Tomus III) (second ed.). Münster: Libreria Regensbergiana.
- Gauchat, Patritius (Patrice) (1935). Hierarchia catholica (in Latin). Vol. IV (1592–1667). Münster: Libraria Regensbergiana.
- Ritzler, Remigius; Sefrin, Pirminus (1952). Hierarchia catholica medii et recentis aevi (in Latin). Vol. V (1667–1730). Patavii: Messagero di S. Antonio.
- Ritzler, Remigius; Sefrin, Pirminus (1958). Hierarchia catholica medii et recentis aevi (in Latin). Vol. VI (1730–1799). Patavii: Messagero di S. Antonio.
- Ritzler, Remigius; Sefrin, Pirminus (1968). Hierarchia Catholica medii et recentioris aevi sive summorum pontificum, S. R. E. cardinalium, ecclesiarum antistitum series (in Latin). Vol. VII (1800–1846). Monasterii: Libr. Regensburgiana.
- Ritzler, Remigius; Pirminus Sefrin (1978). Hierarchia catholica Medii et recentioris aevi (in Latin). Vol. 8 (VIII 1846–1903). Il Messaggero di S. Antonio.
- Pięta, Zenon (2002). Hierarchia catholica medii et recentioris aevi (in Latin). Vol. IX (1903–1922). Padua: Messagero di San Antonio. ISBN 978-88-250-1000-8.
- Round, John Horace (1899). Calendar of documents preserved in France: illustrative of the history of Great Britain and Ireland. A.D. 918–1206. Vol. 1. Vol. 1. London: H.M. Stationery Office.

=== Studies ===
- Besse, J.-M., ed. (1920). Abbayes et prieurés de l'ancienne France. Province ecclésiastique de Tours (in French). Vol. 8 (Tome huitième). Paris: A. Picard. pp. 201–225.
- Corson, Guillotin (1920). Pouillé historique de l'Archévêché de Rennes (in French). Vol. 1 (Tome I). Paris: René Hatton.
- Duchesne, Louis (1910). Fastes épiscopaux de l'ancienne Gaule: II. L'Aquitaine et les Lyonnaises. Paris: Fontemoing.
- Ernault, Émile (1889), "Marbode, évêque de Rennes, sa vie, ses oeuvres (1035–1123)," Bulletin et mémoires de la Société archéologique du département d'Ille-et-Vilaine (in French). Vol. 20. Rennes: Ch. Chatel. 1889. pp. 1–260.
- Haureau, B., ed. (1856). Gallia christiana: in provincias ecclesiasticas distribute... opera et studio Domni Dionysii Sammarthani. Ubi de provincia Turonensi agitur (in Latin). Vol. 14 (Tomus quartus decimus). Paris: Firmin Didot. pp. 739–793, Instrumenta 163–170.
- Jean, Armand (1891). Les évêques et les archevêques de France depuis 1682 jusqu'à 1801 (in French). Paris: A. Picard.
- Le Moigne, Frédéric; Christian Sorrel (2016). Les évêques français de la Séparation au pontificat de Jean-Paul II (in French). Paris: Editions du Cerf. ISBN 978-2-204-12086-9.
- Longnon, Auguste, ed. (1903). Recueil des historiens de la France: Pouillés (in Latin). Vol. 3 (Tome III): Province de Tours. Paris: Imprimerie nationale. pp. 169–181.
- Morice, Hyacinthe; Tresvaux du Fraval, François Marie (1839). L' église de Bretagne ou histoire des siéges épiscopaux, séminaires et collégiales, abbayes et autres communautés de cette province: d'après les matériaux de Dom Hyacinthe Morice de Beaubois (in French). Paris: Mequignon. pp. 4–48.
- Power, Daniel (2004). The Norman Frontier in the Twelfth and Early Thirteenth Centuries. Cambridge University Press. ISBN 978-0-521-57172-2.
- Société bibliographique (France) (1907). L'épiscopat français depuis le Concordat jusqu'à la Séparation (1802–1905). Paris: Librairie des Saints-Pères.
