= Germain Gaultier =

Germain Gaultier (bapt. 19 January 1571, in Paris – 11 March 1624, in Rennes) was an architect of the city of Rennes from 1609 to his death and the first architect of the palace of Parlement of Brittany. He is sometimes mistakenly called Gervais and his name given as Gautier or Gauthier.

== Works ==
Gaultier began his apprenticeship in Paris before leaving for the West (Tours, Orléans, a return to Paris then Angers in 1605).

From April 1609, he settled permanently in Rennes and became "controller of the works of the city" from 1610.

From 1606 to 1620, he also worked on the portal of the Saint-Pierre de Rennes cathedral.

=== Palace of the Parlement of Brittany ===
His main work is the drawing and then the direction of the building site of the Palace of the Parlement of Brittany which he directed until his accidental death in March 1624. In January 1624, a ground floor vault still under construction collapsed on him. He died of his wounds two months later.

As early as 1614, he drew up a first plan of the future parliament, then two other plans, the "big and small plan". It is finally the plan modified by the royal architect Salomon de Brosse that will be realized. Germain Gaultier, however, managed the site until his death. As construction manager, he laid the foundation stone on 15 September 1618. He continued to collaborate with Salomon de Brosse after his departure and went to see him in Paris - with the financial assistance of the city of Rennes - in January 1619 and June 1620 to receive the last updated plans.

== Family ==
He was the son of Michel Gaultier, sculptor and Noémie Pilon (sister of the sculptor Germain Pilon).

He married Marie Mansart, daughter of Absalon Mansart, and thus became François Mansart's brother-in-law.

His daughter Marie Gauthier, married to Raphaël Hardouin, will be the mother of Jules Hardouin-Mansart.

== Bibliography ==
- Du Rusquec, Emmanuel (1994). Le Parlement de Bretagne 1554 ⋅ 1994. Rennes: Ouest-France. p. 68-73. ISBN 978-2-7373-4272-1.
