= Pierre Corbineau =

French architect

Pierre Corbineau (1600 – 23 September 1678, Rennes) was a French architect, a member of a family of French architects: the Corbineau. They are found simultaneously in Anjou and in the Comté de Laval.

== Life ==
He was the son of Étienne Corbineau, an architect in Laval with whom he collaborated. He married Marie Beaugrand, widow of the Laval architect, François Houdault.

Corbineau had a son, Gilles who received with his stepbrother the lessons of his father and was an architect like his father and a daughter, Marie, born a little before 1630, who, in 1650, made her religious profession with the Ursulines of Château-Gontier.

For Jacques Salbert, it is possible that his training as an architect was completed with another architect, perhaps Jacques Corbineau.

=== Style ===
The Corbineau were attached to the school of Jean Bullant and like him, they liked to use the apparatus in bossing, the superposed orders, the friezes decorated with triglyphs.

=== Ursulines of Laval ===
In 1617, Étienne Corbineau dealt with the Ursulines, temporarily installed at Pont-de-Mayenne, for the construction of the monastery.

In 1623, this building was sufficiently advanced that a new contract could be concluded between Pierre Cornillau, representative of the Ursulines, and "Estienne and Pierre les Corbineaulx, buttres architectes", who agreed to make and supply for the price of 1.300 Livres the high altar, the "pulpit of the preaching" in stone with Saint-Berthevin marble and black Chamberière marble, and two marble stoups, all in conformity with the drawings they have given them and where the Saint-Berthevin stone is figured in red. In 1627, the Ursulines took possession of their monastery. This was the first collaboration between father and son. The altarpiece disappeared in 1848.

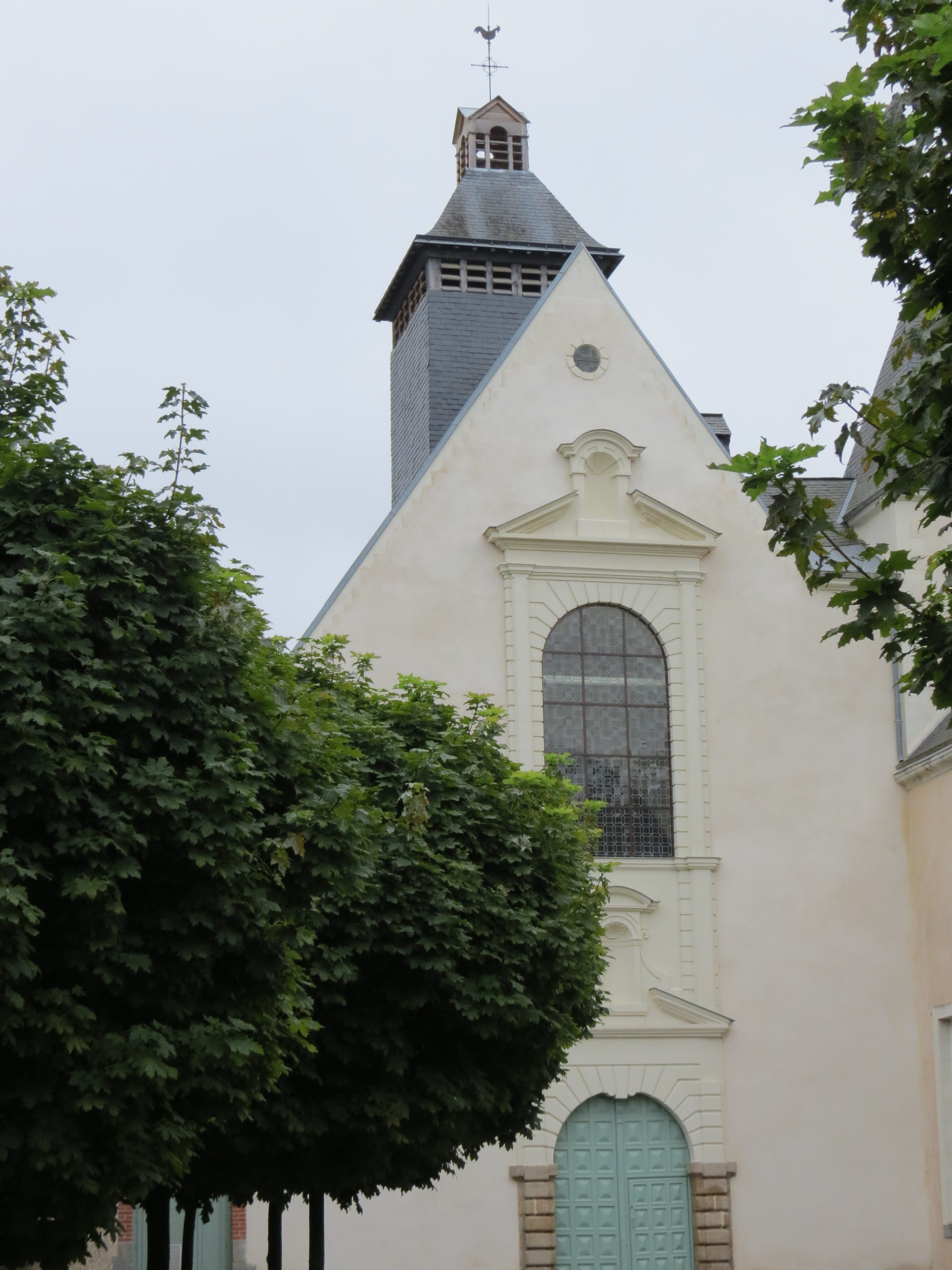
The former chapell of the Ursulines

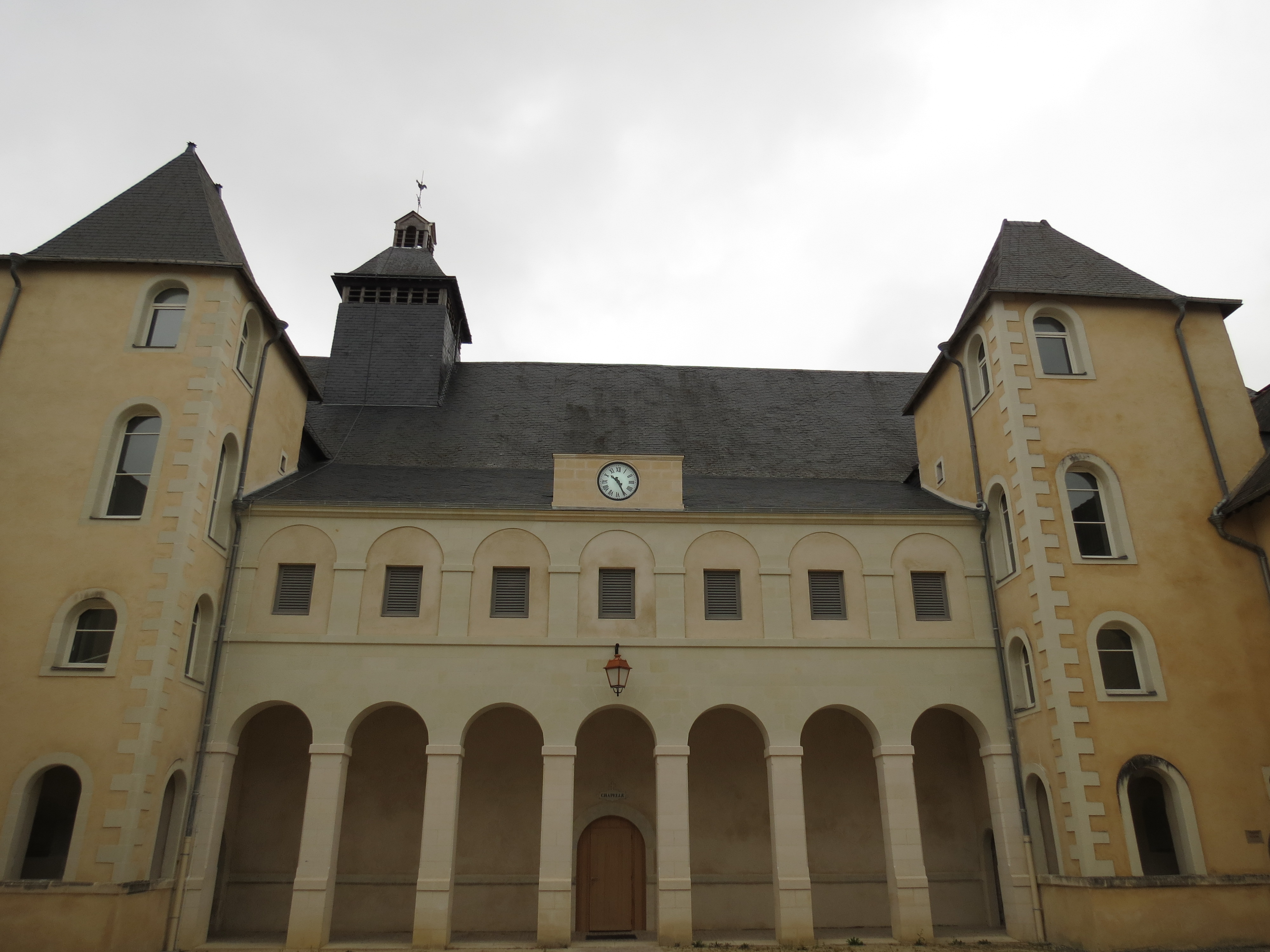
The former chapell of the Ursulines

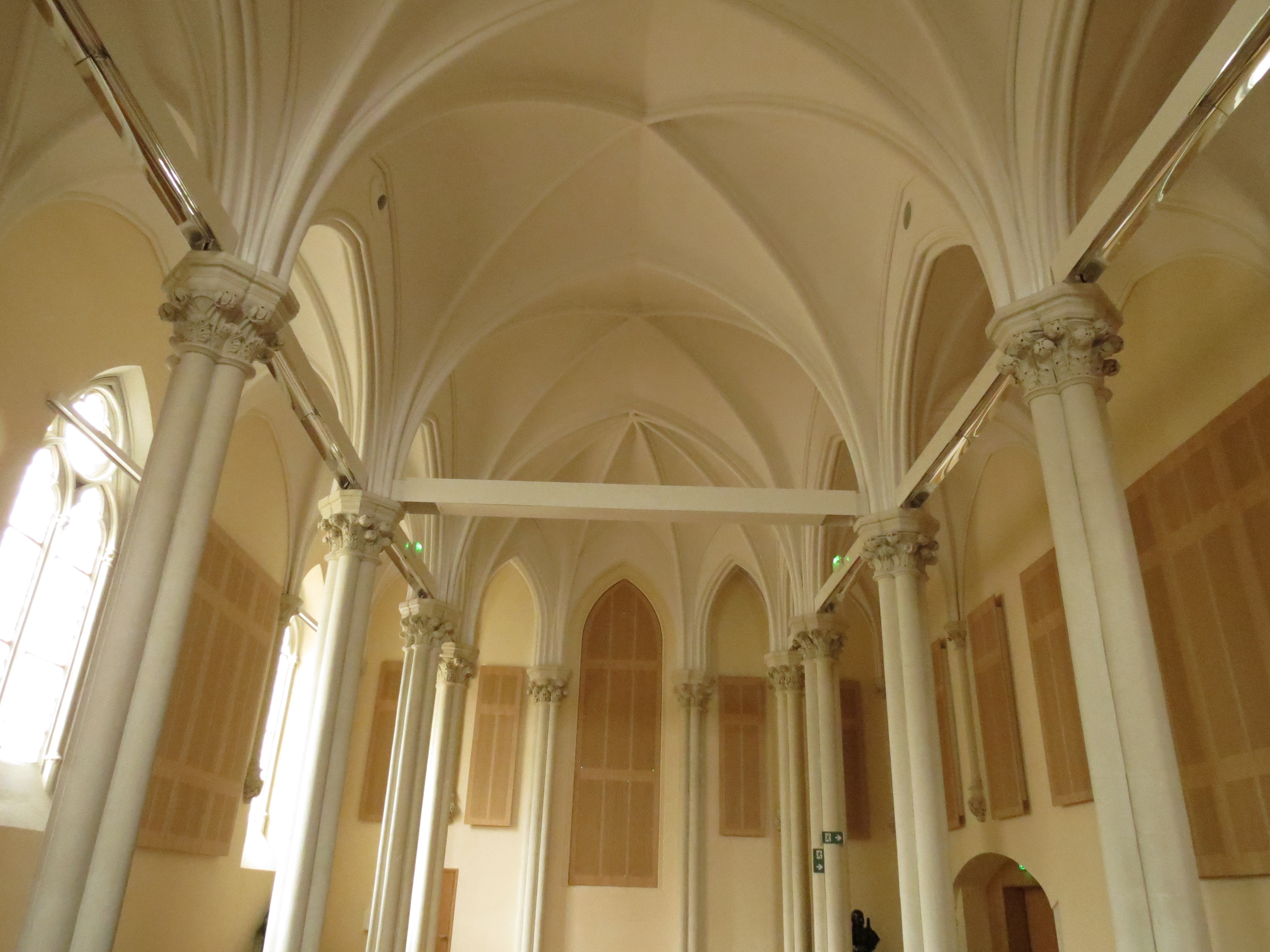
The former chapell of the Ursulines

=== Benedictines of Laval ===
On July 10, 1630, Étienne and Pierre Corbineau made a commitment to the Benedictines of Laval to build their monastery, chapel, dormitories, refectory, chapter, parlours, etc. The portal, with stained glass above, will be enrichi au moins autant que celui des Monastère des Ursulines de Laval. Six years later, in 1636, the Corbineau signed a contract for the high altar of tuf and marble, for the fence of the choir supporting the gates, also in marble-enriched tuf, for a portal on the Gast.

=== Retable lavallois ===
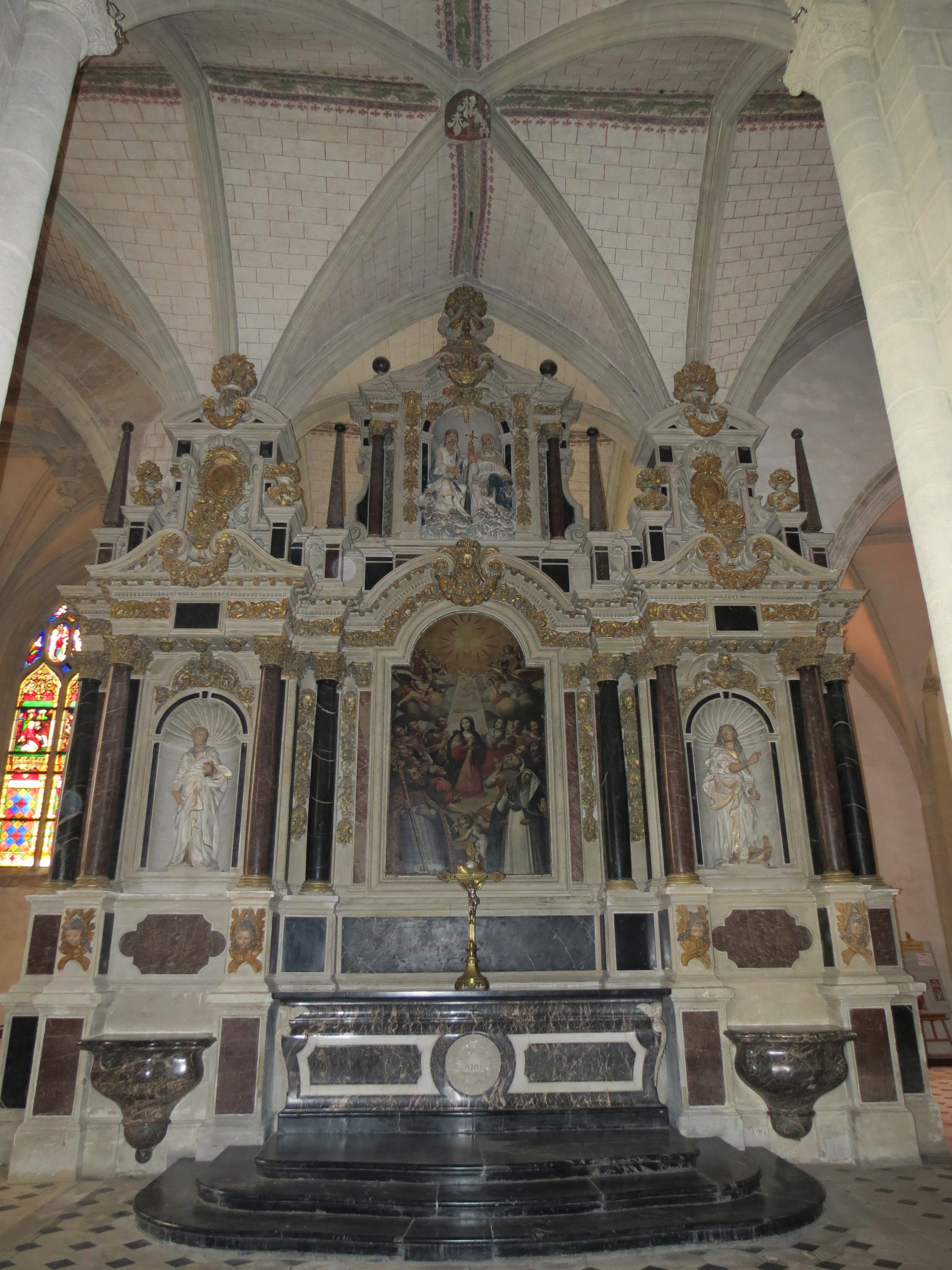
The large altarpiece of the Sainte-Trinité de Laval.

For Jacques Salbert, Pierre Corbineau and his father were responsible for the elevation in 1630 of the altarpiece of the Minimes of Tours, which has now disappeared.

Corbineau is at the origin of most of the large altarpieces of Laval: the high altar of the Église des Cordeliers before 1636, the altar of Saint-François in 1637, and probably the altars of Saint-Joseph, Saint-Pierre du Sacré-Cœur of the same church, as well as the main altar of the Église de la Trinité.

=== Buron d'Azé ===
In 1638, the Monastery of Buron in Azé called upon the Corbineau. It is therefore possible that the Corbineau were at the origin of the Buron portal, the only current vestige of the Abbey.

=== College of the Jésuits of la Flèche ===
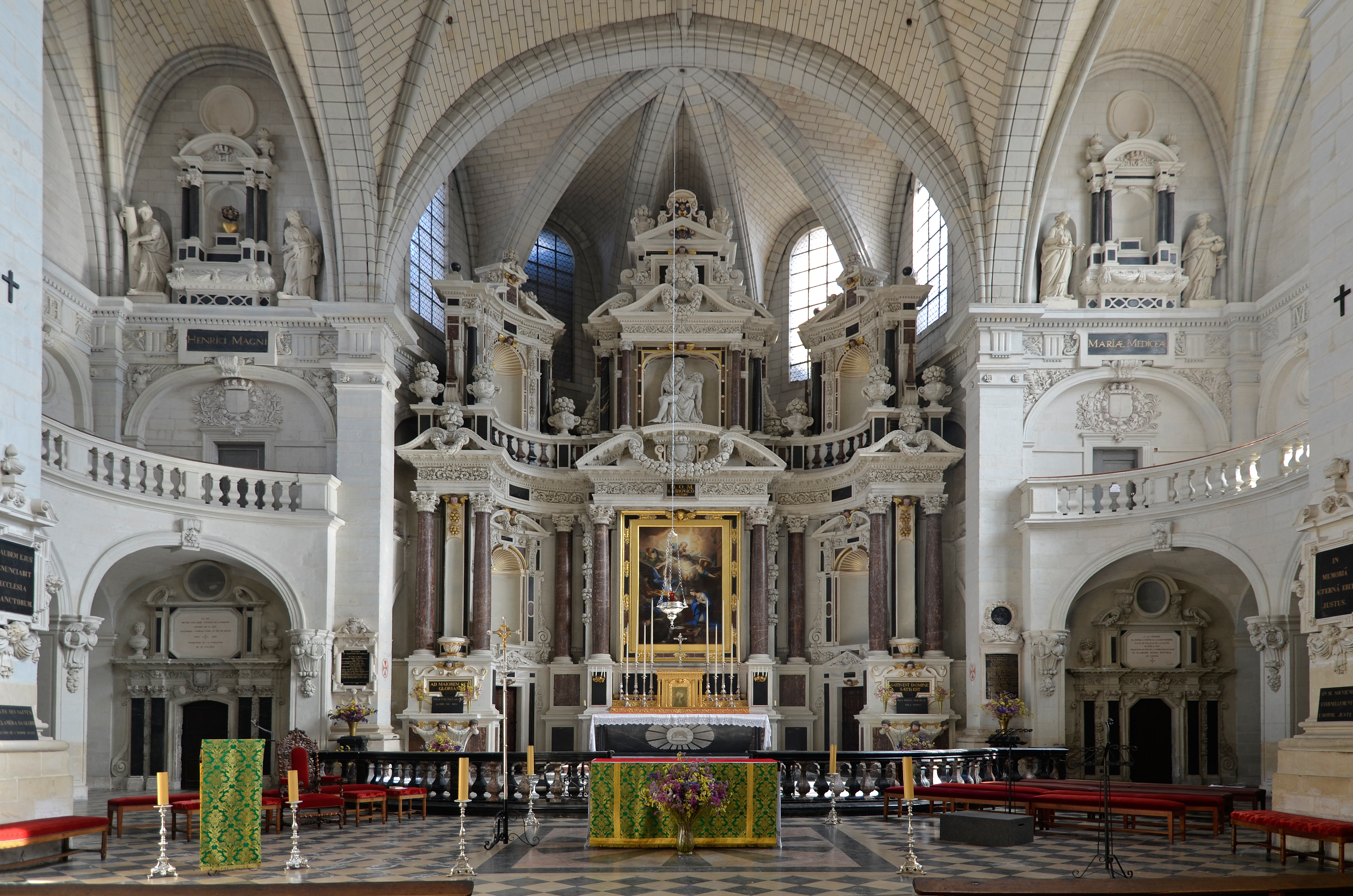
Altarpiece of the choir, in baroque style.

On November 24, 1633, Corbineau obliged himself, vis-à-vis the Jesuits of La Flèche, to make the high altar of their Église Saint-Louis de La Flèche, which one of their own was building, Étienne Martellange. The work was supervised by François Derand.

The altar was finished and consecrated with the church in 1637 by Claude de Rueil, Bishop of Angers. It is possible that he was also at the origin of the construction of the hospital of La Flèche, and perhaps the portal of the Collège Henri-IV de La Flèche.

=== Churches of Laval ===
At the same time, several churches in Laval were rebuilding their high altars according to the new architecture in vogue. On April 29, 1638, the first stone of the high altar of the Église Saint-Vénérand de Laval was laid and the work was completed the following year.

Jacques Salbert attributes the elevation of the main altarpiece to Corbineau at the Église des Cordeliers de Laval. In addition, a contract was signed on July 31, 1637 with Corbineau, "master architect", by which he promised to keep the altar of Saint-François of the église des Cordeliers de Laval finished for the first Sunday of Lent. This altarpiece was to be completed by the first Sunday of Lent of the following year.

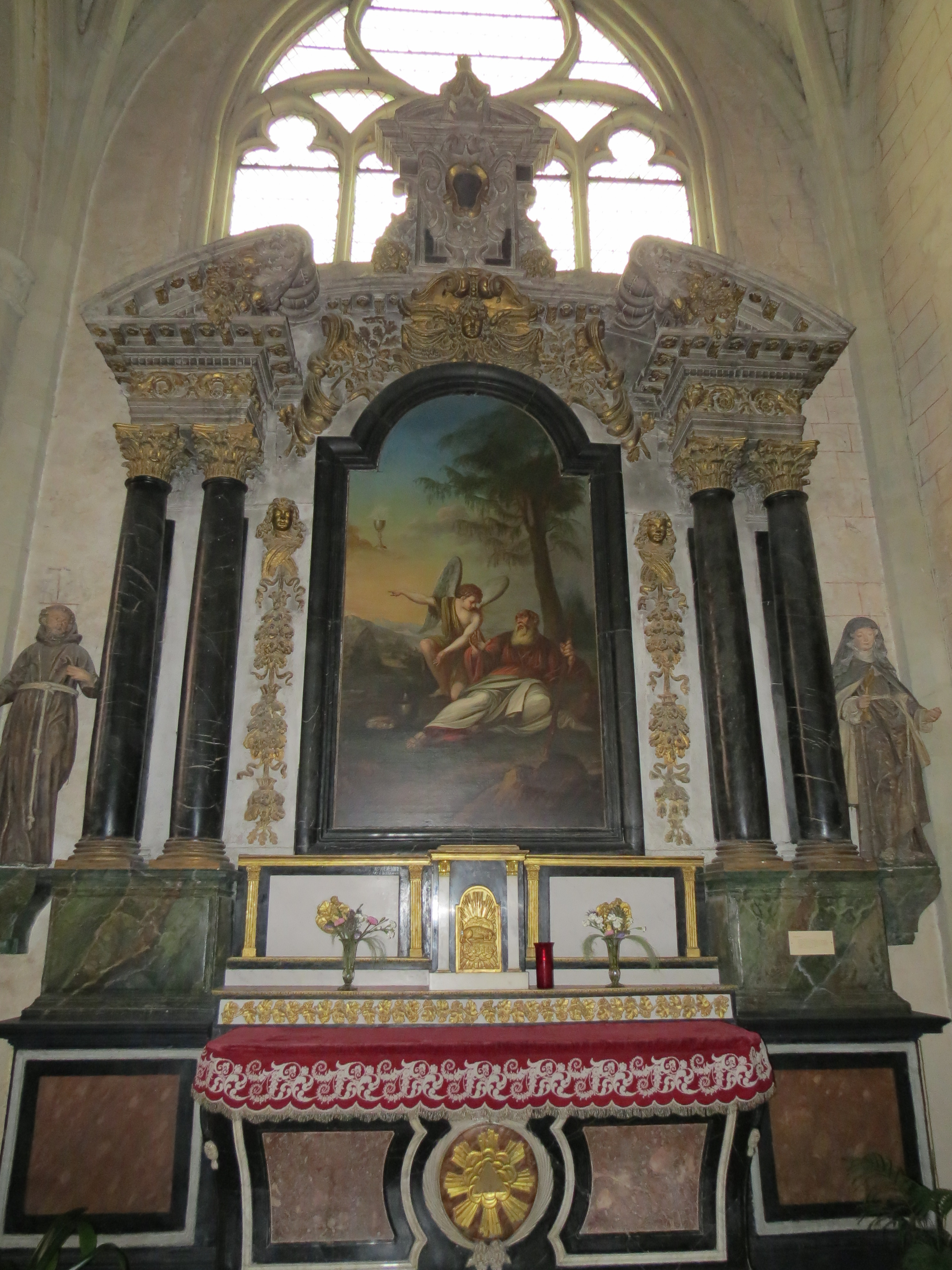
The altarpiece of the Communion.

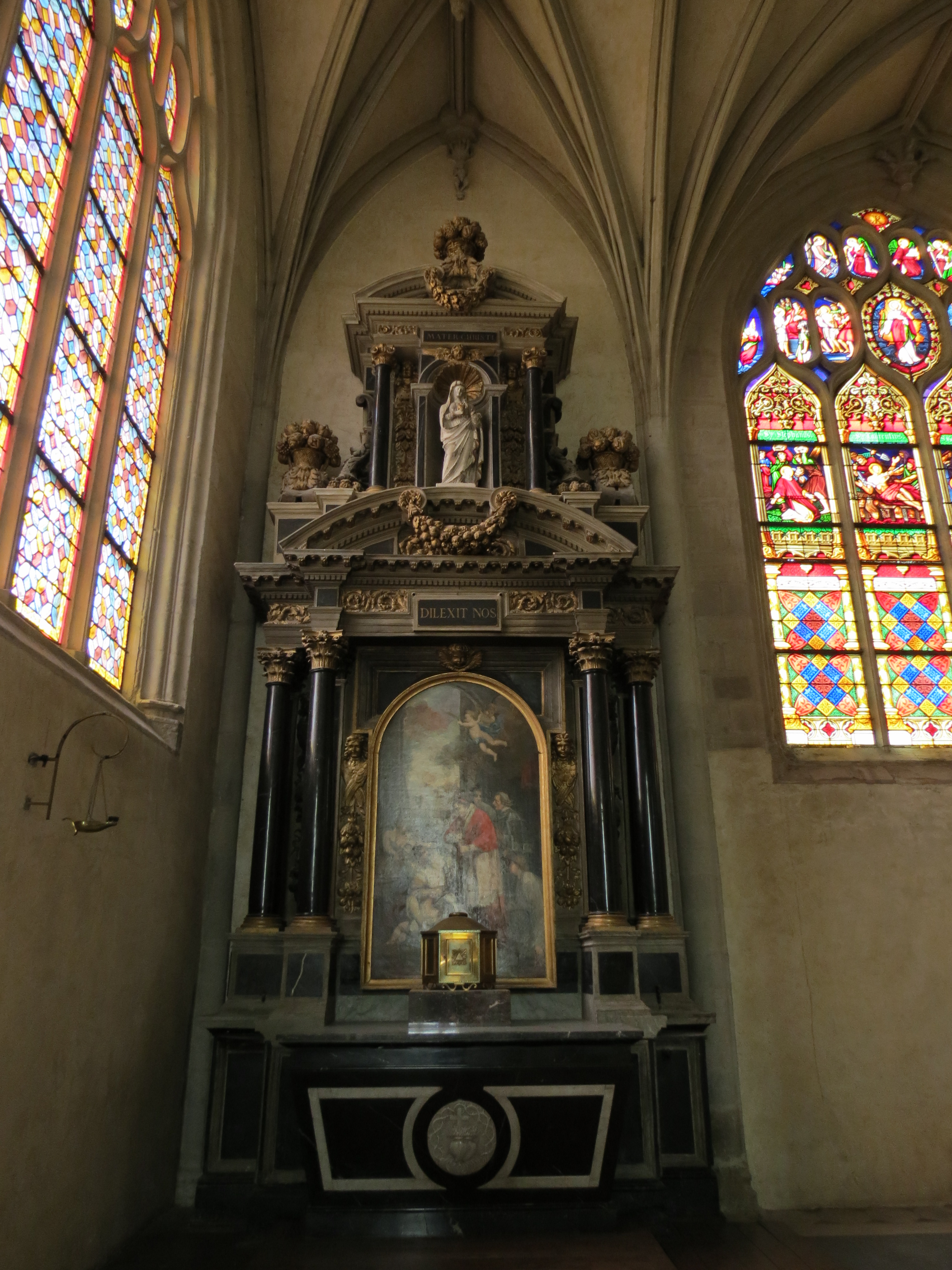
The altarpiece of the Blessed Sacrament.

=== Domalain, Piré, Drouges, Verger-au-Coq ===
The high altar of Domalain was built in 1637 by Corbineau. The altarpiece has the same structure as that of the église de la Trinité de Laval.

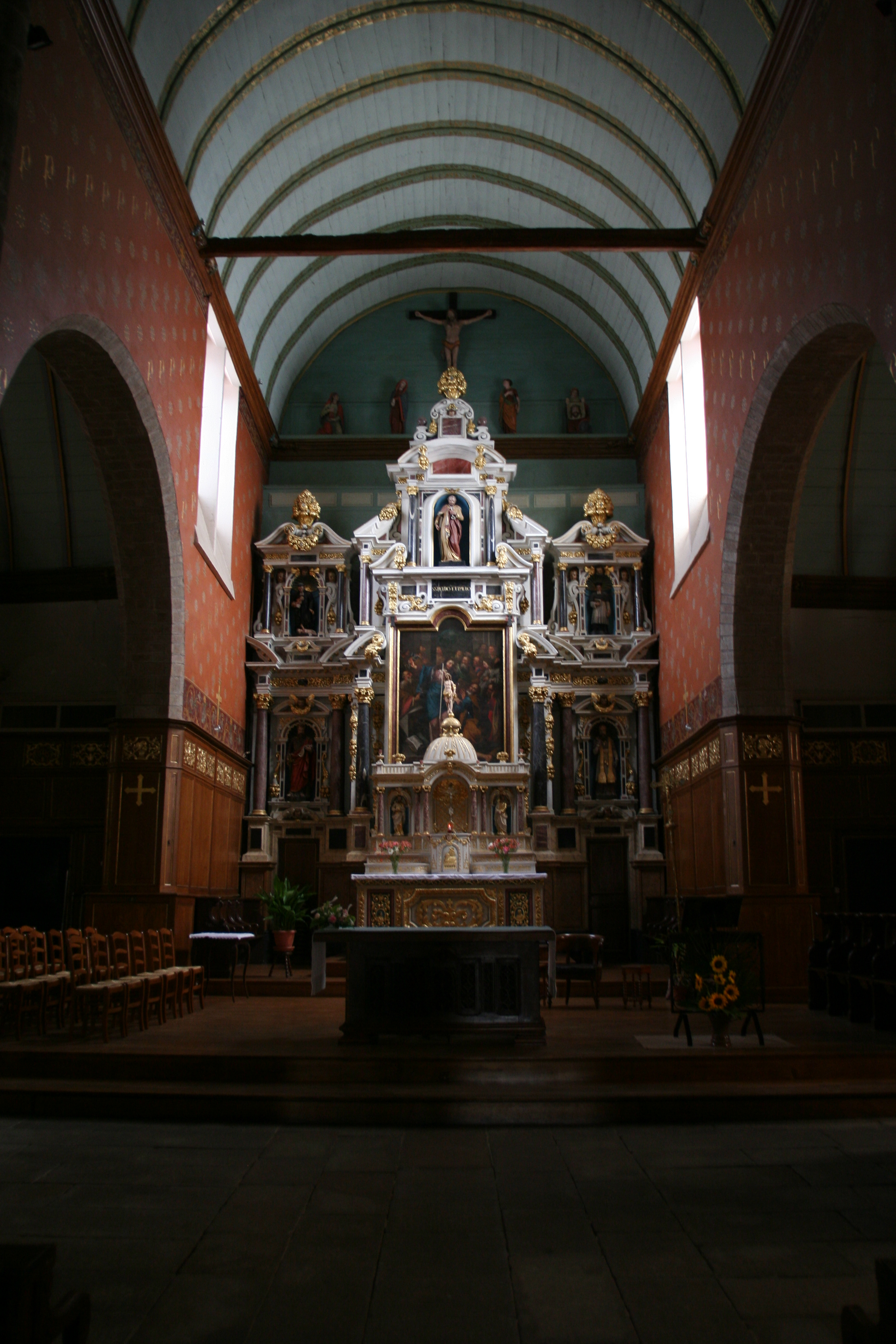
The altarpiece of the main altar of the Saint-Pierre of Piré-sur-Seiche church, representative of the Laval school.

Corbineau made a deal with the inhabitants of Piré-sur-Seiche on December 12, 1637, to build two altars in their church where, in 1631, he had already raised a high altar that still remains. He worked on its realization with Pierre Biardeau.

The church of Drouges has 2 small side altarpieces, the one on the left being a work of Corbineau carried out between 1637 and 1640. He also designed the one for the church of the convent of the Cordeliers of Rennes.

The altarpiece of the chapel of the Château du Verger au Coq in Saint-Germain-sur-Ille is attributed to Corbineau circa 1640.

=== Saint-Pierre de la Couture Abbey ===
Jacques Salbert attributes the elevation of the altarpiece in 1641 of the Saint-Pierre de la Couture Abbey to Corbineau.

=== Architect and marble ===
Appointed architect of the city of Laval in 1645, Corbineau is associated, like his father, with other architects for the operation of the Saint-Berthevin marbles. This marble found its use in the altars built by the Corbineau.

In 1642, it was for Henri de La Trémoille, Duke of La Trémoille and Count of Laval and "following the drawing given to him by Monseigneur le duc", that he made an important contract with the marble makers Jean Nicquet and Philippe Cuvelier. There is no indication of which church or residence, Château de Laval, Olivet or other, this marble decoration was intended for. For Abbot Angot, they were intended for the balustrade of the choir of Les Cordeliers in Laval. It is very possible that its direction was that of Thouars, Domain of the Trémoille. For Jacques Salbert, it is much more likely that it is the jaspered marble balusters that adorn the grand staircase of the Château des Ducs de La Trémoille. For him, it must be considered that Corbineau participated in the major works of the Château de Thouars, and is perhaps the architect whose name is not determined by historians. The activity of Corbineau between 1642 and 1646 remains unknown.

=== Ursulines ===
The first half of the 17th century saw the rise of many Ursuline monasteries. On December 27, 1642, the prosecutor of the Convent of the Ursulines of Château-Gontier, François Débonnaire, signed an agreement with Ambroise, Antoine and Gilles Ravaux. They undertook to work from their profession in dormitories, in the church, in buildings other than the Ursulines feront bastir suivant et au désir du plan qui leur sera faict et fourni par Pierre Corbineau, maître architecte. This work is of long duration. It was only on July 26, 1658, that the nuns made a deal with Pierre and Gilles Corbineau to build the church.

Jacques Salbert attribue le retable de Ursulines d'Angers to Corbineau. Consecrated in 1651, it is comparable to those of Corbineau carried out for the Cordeliers de Laval, for the altarpieces of Piré, La Flèche and Domalain. Jacques Salbert indicates that the major altarpiece of the Ursulines d'Angers, attributed without proof to Pierre Biardeau or one of his students by E. Rondeau in his Histoire du monastères des Ursulines d'Angers presents such analogies of structure and ornamental vocabulary with Pierre Corbineau's works at Les Cordeliers de Laval, Piré, La Flèche and Domalain that the hypothesis hardly stands up to scrutiny realized for the Ursulines of Château-Gontier.

=== Parliament of Brittany ===
The work of the Palais du Parlement de Bretagne was interrupted by a plague epidemic in 1627; they did not resume until 1640 under the direction of Tugal Caris, Laval's prime contractor, and then by Pierre Corbineau from 1647 to 1655. The construction site was again disrupted during the parliamentary fronde between 1648 and 1649 and it was not until 1654 that the work was completed. On 13 January 1655, the Parliament awarded him 6,000 Livres for work not included in his contract, an amount that was to be paid to him after the completion of the structure and roofing. Two days earlier, the Court had taken possession, on great solemnity, of the completed Palace, which only needed to be decorated.

=== Torcé, Brie, Rennes ===
Corbineau made the high altar of the Carmes de Rennes in 1648. The altarpiece of the high altar of the church of Torcé is by Corbineau, and dates from 1652.

On January 2, 1653, the foundation stone of two altars was laid in Brie. entrepris par honorables hommes Pierre Corbineau, maître architecte du Palais de Rennes, et Gilles Corbineau, son fils. For Jacques Salbert, the two side altars are by Gilles Corbineau alone, like a work of a sculptor.

During this period, Pierre Corbineau lived in Rennes, parish of Saint-Germain, or in la Talmouzière in Montgermont rather than in his Laval properties, which he left to the Houdault family.

=== Rennes Cathedral ===
It was around the same time that Corbineau was called by the Rennes Chapter to replace Tugal Caris. He was in charge of the construction of the Rennes Cathedral from 1654.

According to Léon Palustre, Caris would have led the work to the cornice on the first floor. After him, Corbineau, from 1654 to 1678, completed the superposition of the three orders and placed the coat of arms of Louis XIV above the immense window in the facade of the monument. Then François Huguet removed the two towers, gave them two independent floors, and in 1703 put the finishing touches to this work. He brought the levels to their current height to 48 metres and added Louis XIV's motto: (Nec pluribus impar, the incomparable) on the pediment at the top of the facade.

=== Dol-de-Bretagne ===
Corbineau built a campanile in 1660 at the Cathédrale Saint-Samson de Dol-de-Bretagne. In 1664, Corbineau was called to Dol-de-Bretagne to examine the plans proposed by the Rennes architect Deschamps for the reconstruction of the clock building, and proposed various modifications. He completed a lantern to crown the cathedral tower.

=== Rennes ===
In August 1656, Corbineau undertook to build the church and the various buildings of the Visitandines of Renne in 3 years.

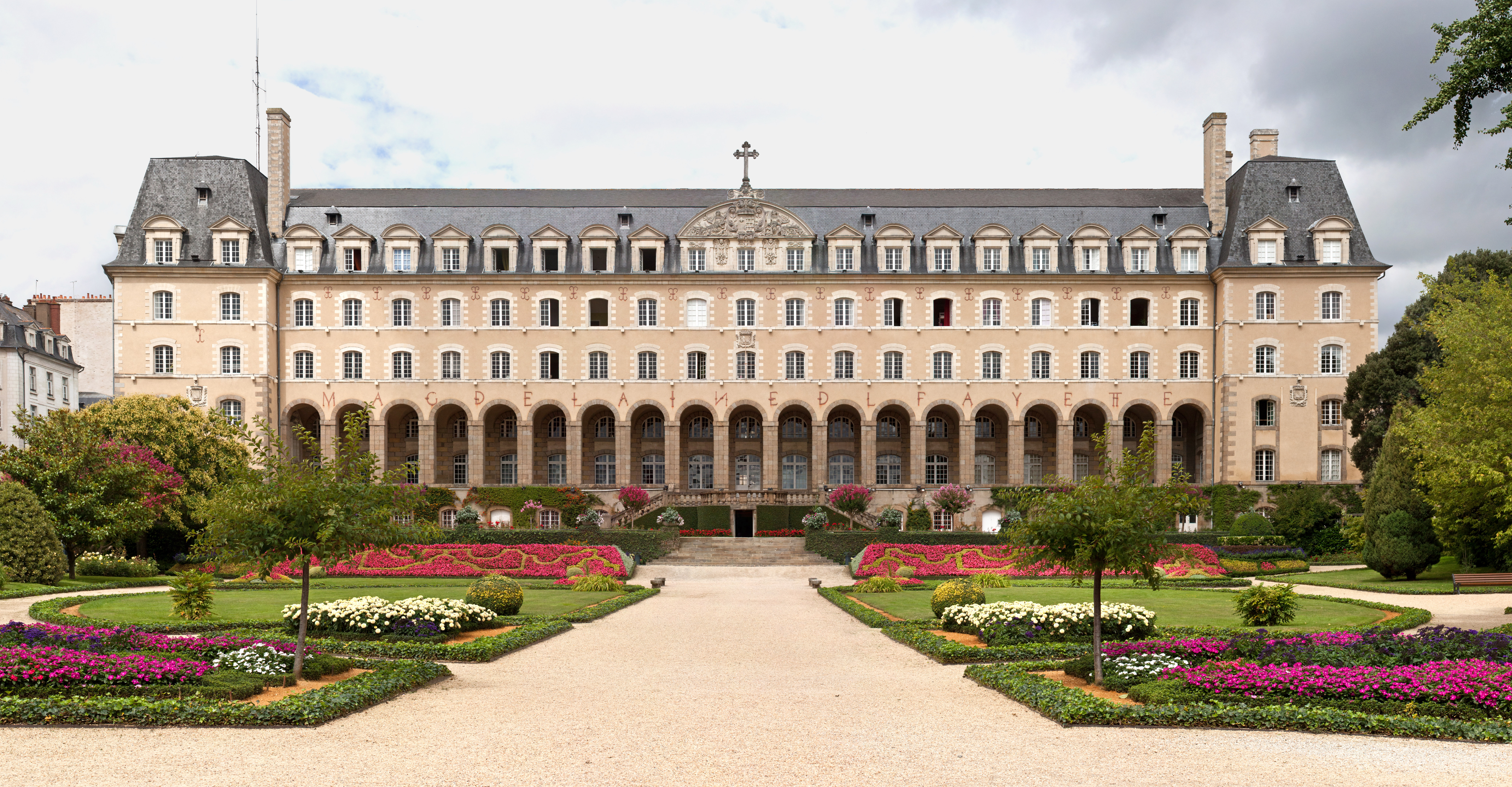
The Saint George Palace

In 1661 Corbineau was the architect of the monastery buildings of the Couvent des Jacobins de Rennes. Abbess Magdelaine de la Fayette presided over the construction of the Saint George Palace in Rennes in 1670 by Corbineau. The large gallery overlooking the garden towards the Vilaine is very similar to the cloister of the Monastery of the Ursulines of Laval.

The facade of the bell tower of Notre-Dame-en-Saint-Melaine is entirely redone in 1676 by Corbineau's workshop.

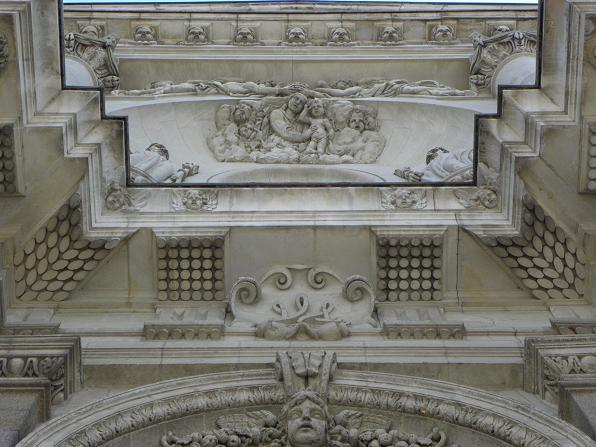
Sculptures de la tour de N.-D. de Rennes par l'atelier de Corbineau

The construction of the Hôtel de la Moussaye took place around 1680, and its design is attributed to Corbineau.

Widowed for several years, Corbineau lived in Rennes where he died on 23 September 1678. He is buried in the chapel of the Cordeliers de Rennes. A service was performed in the parish church of Saint-Germain in accordance with the Edict of His Majesty.

== Main works ==
- Monastère des Bénédictines de Laval
- Palais du Parlement de Bretagne (Rennes)
- High altar of the Jesuit Church of la Flèche
- Altarpiece of the Église des Cordeliers de Laval
- Couvent des Ursulines de Château-Gontier
- Rennes Cathedral
- Saint George Palace of Rennes
- Front of the bell tower of Notre-Dame-en-Saint-Melaine of Rennes
- Altarpiece of the church of Rouez-en-Champagne
- Altarpiece of the church of Domalain

== Bibliography ==
- Jules-Marie Richard, Les constructeurs de retables, Société d'archéologie et d'histoire de la Mayenne, 1906.
- Jacques Salbert, Ateliers de retabliers Lavallois aux XVIIe et XVIII{e siècles : Etudes historiques et artistiques, Presses Universitaires de Rennes, 1976.
