= Huguet (disambiguation) =

Huguet may refer to:

== People ==
=== People with the surname Huguet ===
- Anthony Huguet (born 1973), Australian alpine skier, competed for Australia in Alpine skiing at the 1994 Winter Olympics
- Bernard Huguet (born 1933), French chess master
- Charles Louis Huguet, 1st Marquis of Sémonville (1759–1839), French diplomat and politician
- François Huguet (died circa 1730), French architect
- Gaietà Huguet, leader of the Republican Left of the Valencian Country
- Jaume Huguet (1415–1492), Catalan gothic painter, of the Catalan School
- José Nicolau Huguet (1855–1909), Spanish painter
- Josep Huguet (born 1951), Spanish politician
- Katriana Huguet (born 1990), American recording artist known professionally as Kat Dahlia
- Raymond Huguet (1938–2022), French cyclist
- Sonia Huguet (born 1975), French cyclist

=== People with the given name Huguet ===
- Huguet (died 1438) gothic architect in Portugal
- Hugh V of Bas (died 1335), nicknamed Huguet, Catalan nobleman and military leader
