= Saint George Palace =

French historical building

Palace of Saint George
- Palais Saint-Georges
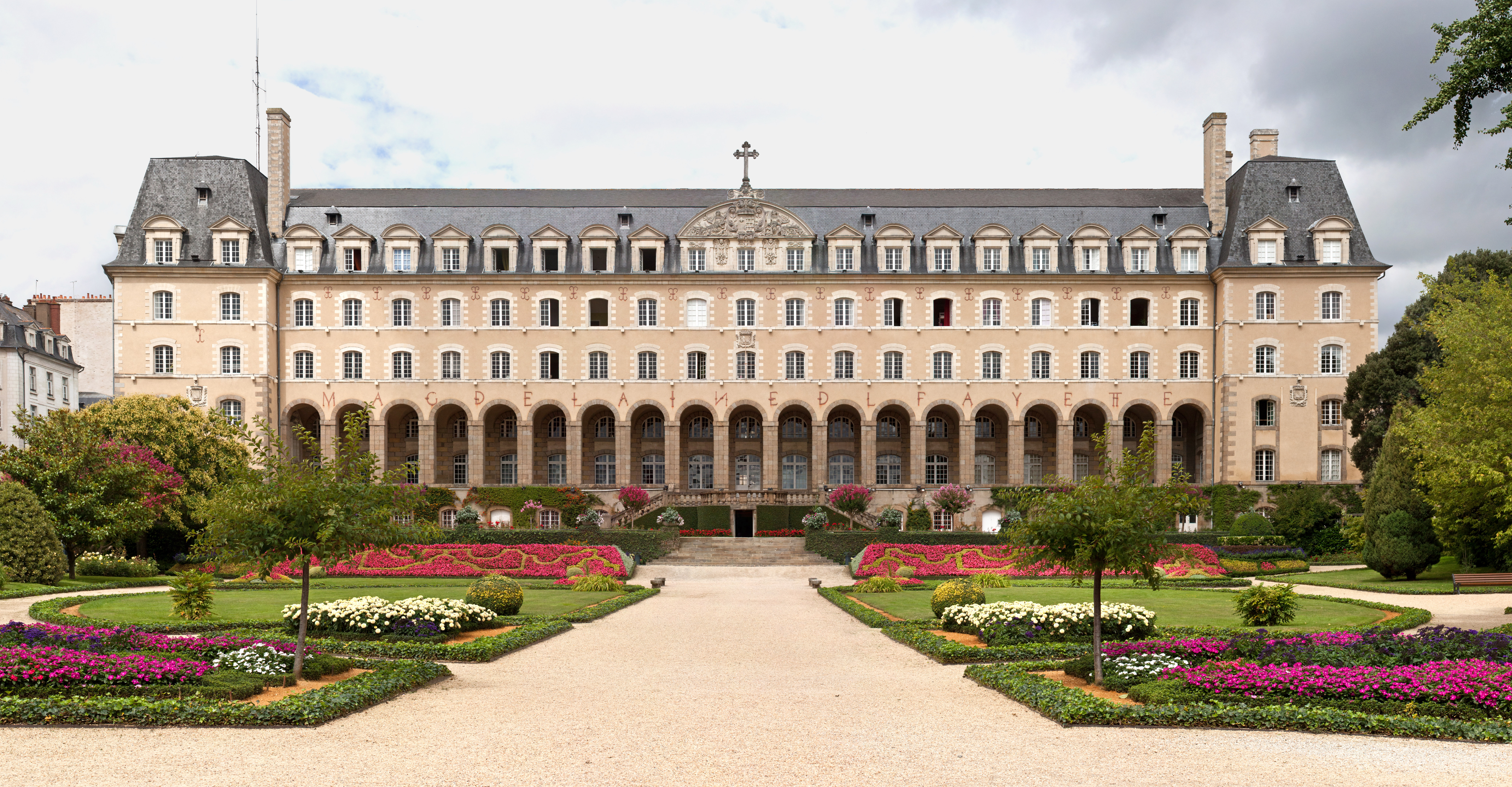
- South façade of the palace

- Location within Rennes

General information
- Status: monument historique
- Location: city of Rennes, Ille-et-Vilaine, Brittany, France
- Coordinates: 48°06′42″N 01°40′27″W
- Completed: 1670
- Owner: commune of Rennes

Design and construction
- Architect: Pierre Corbineau

The Saint George Palace (French: Palais Saint-Georges) is an historic building in the city of Rennes. Formerly an abbey residence, it was built in 1670 to replace a much older abbey building that stood on the same site. The Benedictine Abbey of Saint George (Abbaye Saint-Georges de Rennes) was forced to close in 1792 during the French Revolution and the property was seized by the government. Since 1930 the building has been listed as a monument historique of France.

== Location ==
Saint George Palace, at 2 rue Gambetta, is situated east of the city centre in the Thabor-Saint Hélier quarter of Rennes. The front garden and main façade face south and the building lies very near the north bank of the Vilaine river, and is within sight while travelling north along rue Jean Janvier. It is served by the Métro station République.

== History ==
In 1032, Duke Alain III of Brittany founded the Benedictine abbey of Saint George on behalf of his sister Adèle, a Benedictine nun who became the convent's first abbess. The abbey thrived for several centuries.

Magdelaine de la Fayette was the 38th abbess, holding this position from 1663 to 1688. In the 1660s she commissioned the architect Pierre Corbineau to design a new building. She oversaw the demolition of the main abbey building, and presided over the construction of the new Palais Saint-Georges, built by Corbineau and assisted by another architect from Laval, Tugal Caris. The first two stones were laid on 24 March 1670; one by Charles-François de La Vieuville, Bishop of Rennes, and the other by Magdelaine de la Fayette. The stones bore copper plates engraved with declarations in Latin. The first one read:

In the name of Jesus the Most High, the most illustrious Lord Charles François de la Vieuville, bishop of Rennes, was present at the inception of this house, and blessed it, and greatly desired true peace for all the spouses of Jesus Christ who were to dwell in it. 24 March 1670. (Note: Original Latin text: In nomine Jesu Altissimi. Illustrissimus D. Carolus Franciscus de la Vieuville episcopus Rhedonensis, harum ædium inchoationi adfuit, benedixit, omnibusque J. C. Sponsis eas habitaturis veram pacem exoptavit. Anno Christi M^{o} DC^{o} LXX^{o}. Indictione VIII. IX Kal. aprilis.)

The second stone's copper plate was engraved with the inscription:

With the favour of God, the greatest and best, Lady Magdelaine de la Fayette, most celebrated for ancestry and virtues, undertook and initiated with singular zeal the renovation of this house, which was collapsing on account of age, from its foundations into a more splendid form. 24 March 1670. (Note: Original Latin text: Deo optimo maximo favente, D^{na} Magdalena de la Fayette natalibus virtutibusque clarissima has ædes vetustate ruentes in ampliorem formam a fundamentis renovandas singulari zelo suscepit inchoavitque, Anno Christi M^{o} DC^{o} LXX^{o}. Indict. VIII. IX Kal. aprilis.)

The building remained in use as a Benedictine abbey until 1792, when the French Revolution forced the abbess Julie Barreau de Girac to abandon the abbey, along with approximately twenty-four nuns, three novices, and eleven lay sisters. The properties were seized and were used temporarily as barracks serving the revolution, and the stone cross above the central pediment was destroyed. A cross was eventually reinstated around 1970, as a reminder of the building's heritage as an abbey.

On 22 March 1930, Palais Saint-Georges was registered as a monument historique of France. The building is now owned by the commune of Rennes and houses the fire services for the city and other civil administrative offices.

== Description ==
The central feature of the building is its long gallery of nineteen two-storey windows and paired nineteen granite arches. The gallery is accessed by a large double staircase with substantial stone balustrade. At either end of the main gallery section are two pavilions in the same style. The mansard roof features twenty-three dormer windows and above the three central windows is a large semi-circular pediment surmounted by a stone cross. The pediment is sculpted with the arms of the abbey, flanked by figures of justice and peace.

The coat of arms of the abbess Magdelaine de la Fayette is present in relief on both end pavilions and in the centre of the building between the second- and third-storey windows. Her name is featured in the form of iron bars shaped as letters, bolted to the façade, and spaced evenly above the pier of each arch, as MAGDELAINEDLFAYETTE, with the double T joined above one pier.

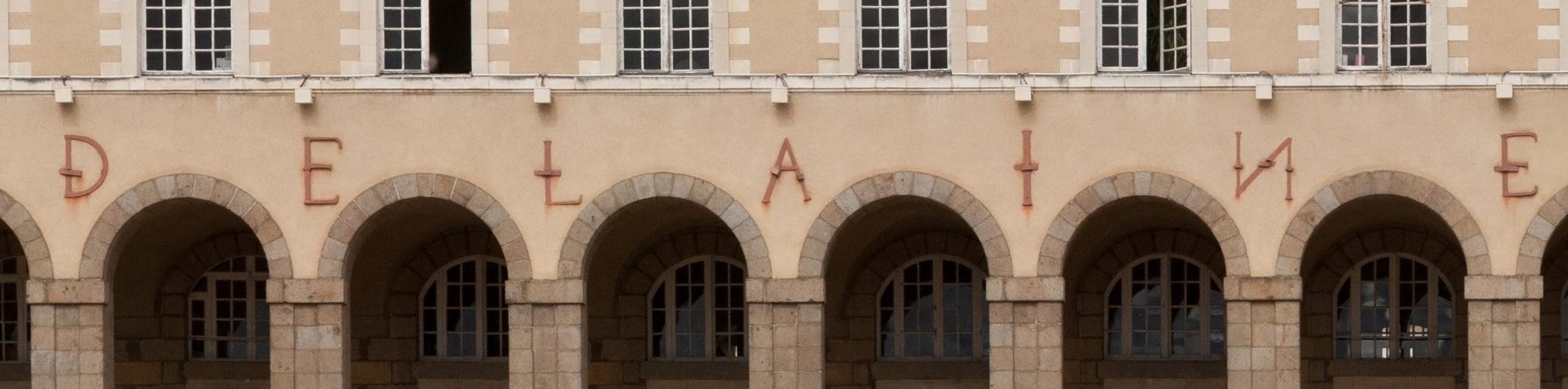
Detail of iron bar letters above arches

A landscaped formal garden, Jardin Saint-Georges, is situated in front of the building, with gravel paths leading to the main entrance.
