= Church of Saint-Louis, La Flèche =

French church in La Flèche

Coordinates: 47°42′01″N 0°04′34″W

Church of Saint-Louis, La Flèche.
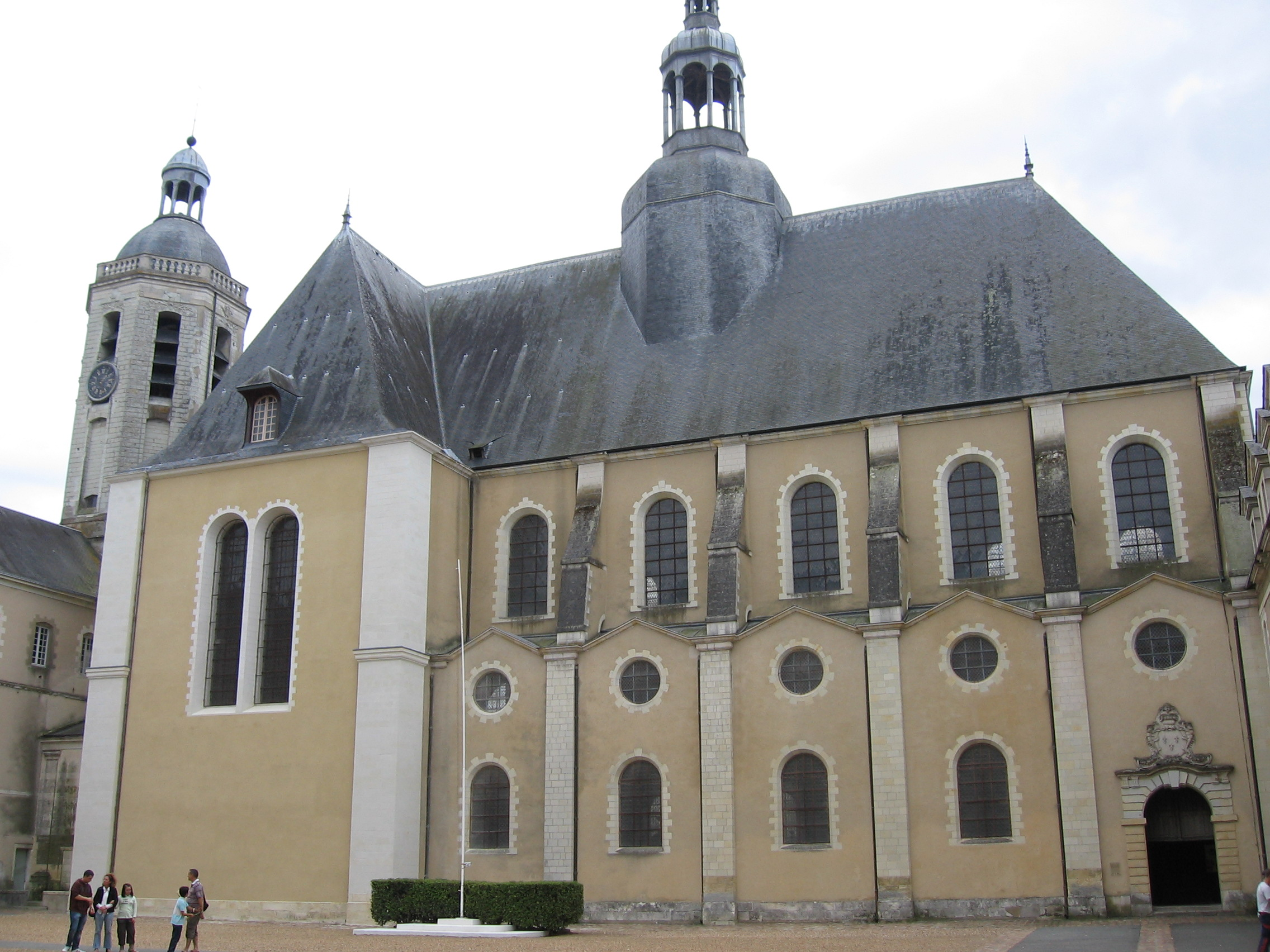

Religion
- Affiliation: Catholic
- Province: La Flèche
- Region: Pays de la Loire

Location
- Country: France
- Interactive map of Church of Saint-Louis, La Flèche.

Architecture
- Completed: 1621

The Church of Saint-Louis (French: Église Saint-Louis de La Flèche) is located in La Flèche, in the French department of Sarthe. It was built from 1607 onwards in the grounds of the Collège Henri-IV, a Jesuit college founded in 1603 by Henri IV, and completed in 1621. Since 1808, it has been part of the Prytanée National Militaire, where the ashes of the hearts of Henri IV and Queen Marie de Médicis are kept, and is a parish of the Diocese of the French Armed Forces (Diocèse aux Armées Françaises).

Designed by architect Louis Métezeau, the church is in a transitional style between traditional Gothic architecture and the Italian influence of the late 16th century. The whiteness and sobriety of the nave contrast with the profusion of Baroque decoration on the high altar and organ loft. The church has been a listed monument historique since 1919.

== History ==
=== From the founding of the Jesuit college to the church ===
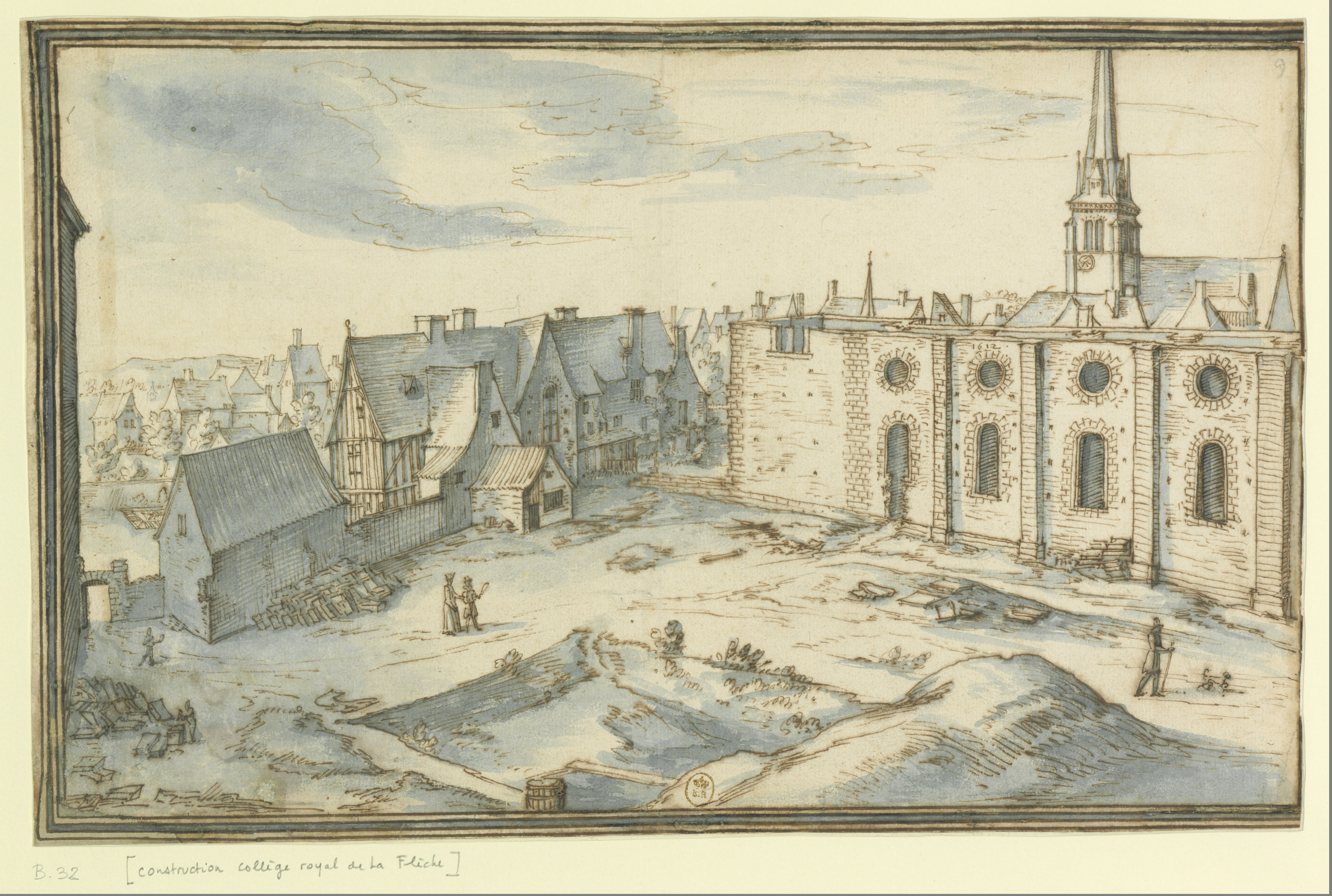
The construction of the royal college, drawing by Étienne Martellange in 1612.

On September 3, 1603, Henri IV signed the Edict of Rouen authorizing the return of the Jesuits to France and then decided to cede his “Château-Neuf” at La Flèche to the Jesuits so that they could establish a college. In the Edict of Fontainebleau, issued in 1607, the king laid down the college's teaching program and promised to build its church. He also indicated that he wished his heart to be removed from his body after his death, and placed in the college's church.

Construction of the church, directed by Jacques le Féron de Longuemézière, began in 1607, to plans drawn up by Louis Métezeau, the king's architect. The foundation stone was laid in the crypt by Jean de Beaumanoir, marshal of Lavardin, and blessed by the parish priest of Saint-Thomas church in La Flèche.

The day after Henri IV's death, Guillaume Fouquet de La Varenne, the king's advisor and governor of La Flèche, reminded Queen Marie de Médicis of the king's promise to bequeath his heart to the college. The deceased's heart was then entrusted to the Jesuits and brought to La Flèche, where the procession entered on the morning of June 4, 1610, led by Duke Hercule de Rohan-Montbazon. A ceremony was held in the church of Saint-Thomas before the heart was transferred to the royal college.

=== Completion of the work ===
In 1611, the Féron de Longuemézière was discharged from the work, and the church construction site was put on hold. The following year, Father Étienne Martellange was sent to La Flèche by Marie de Médicis to oversee the completion of the church, whose expenses were paid from the royal treasury. On his arrival, Martellange wrote a manuscript in which he made a number of criticisms of the early stages of the college's construction, in particular, the “notorious faults of the church”. Martellange's remarks relate as much to the layout of the church as to its interior architecture. By this time, construction of the chapel was well advanced, and Martellange could only make minor modifications, such as the transept projection, which was absent from the early plans for the church.

Guillaume Fouquet de la Varenne died on December 7, 1616 at his château in La Flèche. In accordance with the favor he had obtained from the king, his tomb was built at the foot of the urn containing Henri IV's heart in the college church, while his body was interred in the crypt.

The structural work on the church was completed in 1621 with the installation of the rib vaults, and it was opened to worship the following year to mark the canonizations of Saint Ignatius of Loyola and Saint Francis Xavier. The ceremonies, presided over by Mgr Charles de Beaumanoir de Lavardin, Bishop of Le Mans, lasted eight days. The church was consecrated in 1637 under the patronage of Saint Louis by Claude de Rueil, bishop of Angers. Work on the church's interior continued throughout the 17th century. The high altarpiece was commissioned in 1633 from Laval architect Pierre Corbineau, the organ loft was installed between 1637 and 1640, and the cross loft in 1648, while decoration of the chapels and choir continued until 1693.

On April 12, 1643, in accordance with Henri IV's wishes, the heart of Marie de Médicis was transferred to La Flèche to join that of her former husband in the church of the Collège Royal. In 1648, two niches were dug on either side of the choir, in the upper part of the transept arms, to house the cenotaphs containing the hearts of Henri IV and Marie de Médicis.

=== Contemporary period ===
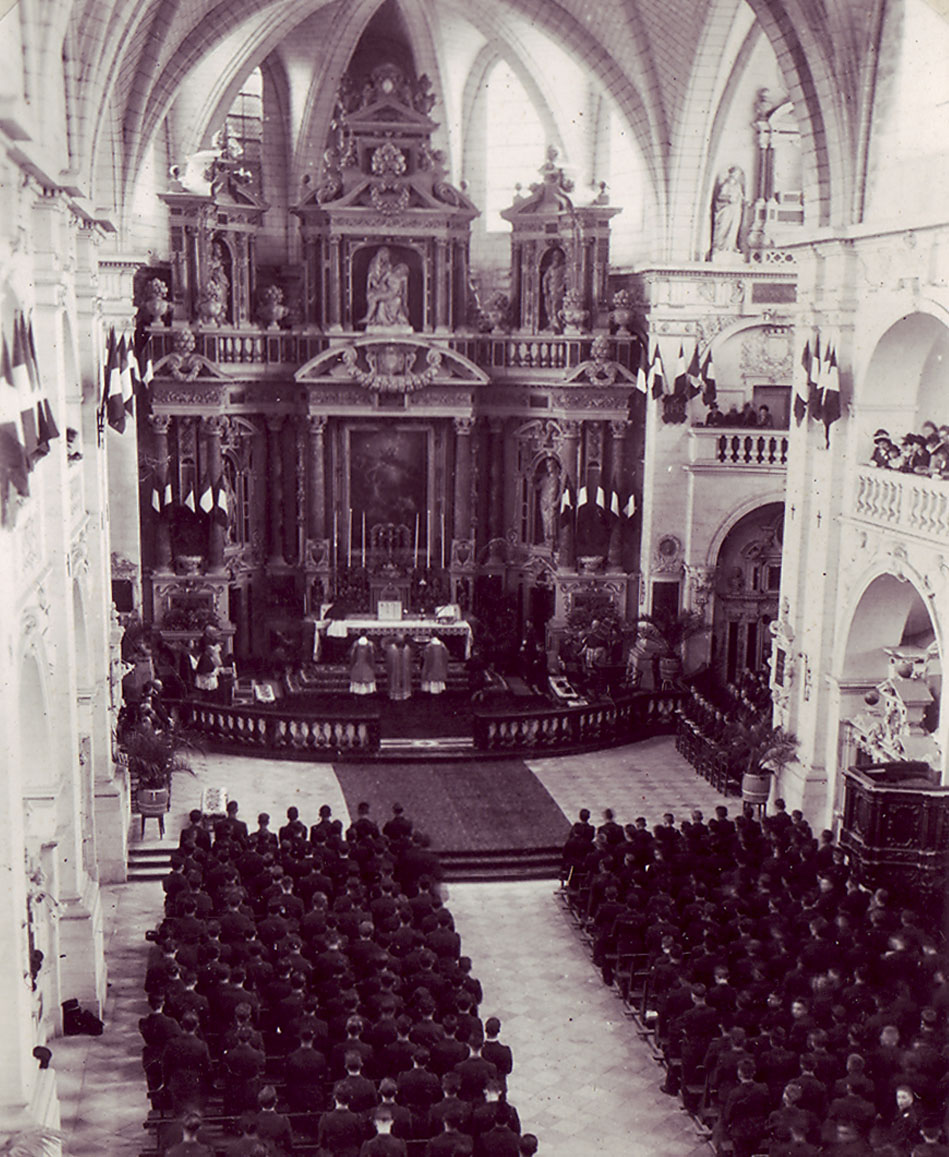
Mass at Saint-Louis church in the 1950s.

In September 1793, during the French Revolution, the representative Didier Thirion visited La Flèche and gave the order to seize the cenotaphs and burn the royal hearts at the stake in the public square, now known as Place de la Libération. Doctor Charles Boucher, a surgeon from La Flèche, collected some of the ashes and placed them in a reliquary. His heirs returned them to the Prytanée National Militaire, successor to the Collège Royal, in 1814. Transformed into a military school shortly before the Revolution, the college was occupied by the administration of the La Flèche district in 1793, then by the municipality from 1795 onwards. The chapel was then transformed into a meeting room for a revolutionary club, and several decorations were destroyed.

In 1808, Napoleon I decided to transfer the Prytanée national militaire de Saint-Cyr to La Flèche, on the premises of the former Jesuit college. The church and other buildings were integrated into the new institution. In 1828, Saint-Louis church became a parish. Along with the Prytanée's main entrance, it was listed as a historic monument in 1919. In the early 1930s, on the initiative of Norbert Dufourcq, a member of the commission des orgues des monuments historiques, and Monseigneur Giraud, canon of Saint-Thomas church, an appeal for the restoration of the chapel organ was launched in the press. The restoration was carried out by Victor Gonzalez and was not completed until 1947.

In 1965, two new bells, made by a workshop in Annecy-le-Vieux and donated by the “Comité des amis de la chapelle”, were installed in the church tower. Between 1988 and 1994, the Saint-Louis church underwent numerous restorations, including that of the organ. In May 1996, Mgr Michel Dubost, Bishop of the Armed Forces, blessed the instrument, which was inaugurated on September 22, with a recital by André Isoir, titular organist at Saint-Germain-des-Prés.

The Saint-Louis church is now a parish of the diocese of the French Armed Forces, where mass is celebrated every Sunday and once or twice a week.

Several parts of the church were restored between 2004 and 2021, including the west gable, a tower, and above all the entire campanile, shaft, and belfry.

== Architecture ==
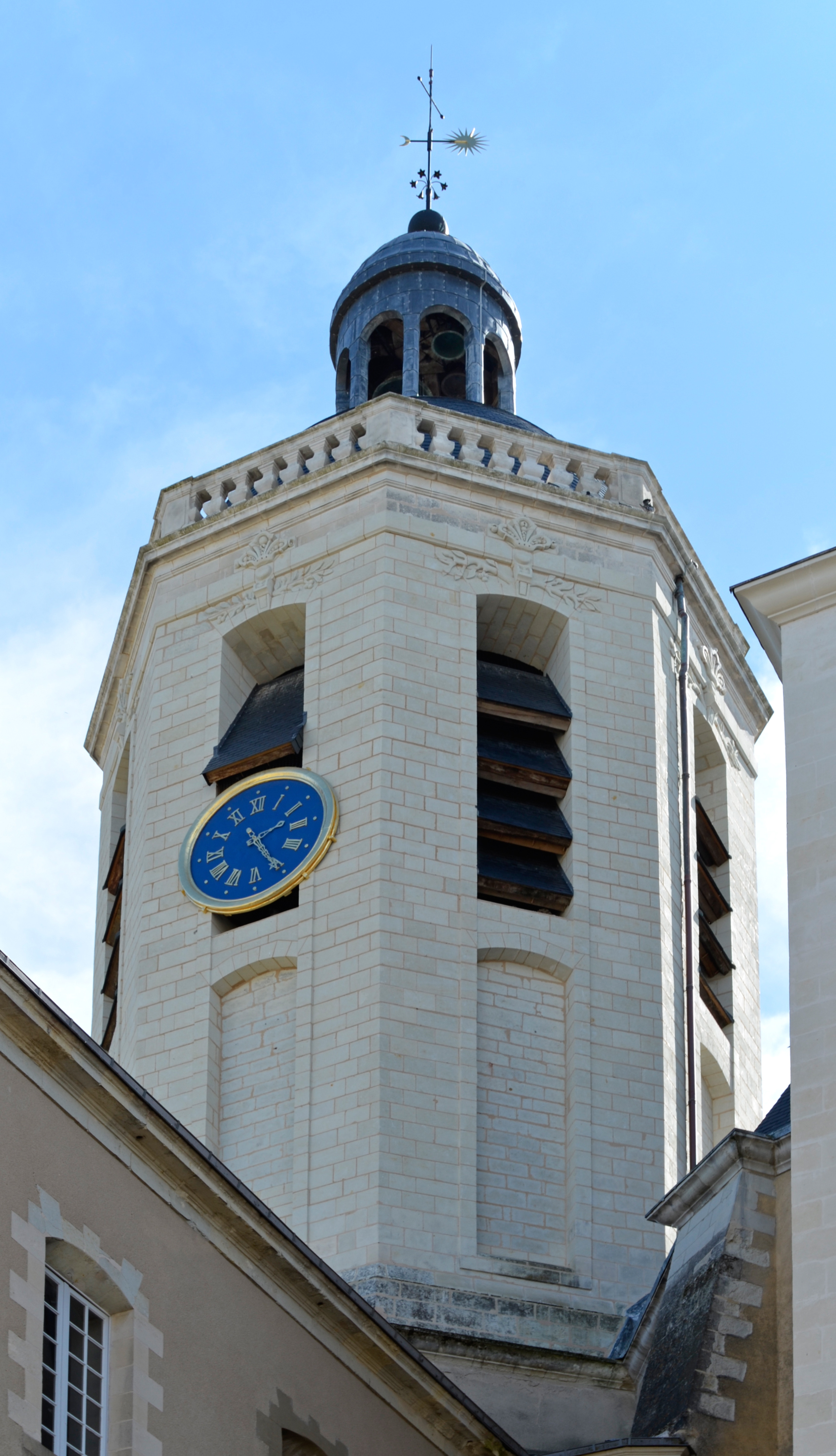
The “stone tower”, which houses the church's bell tower.

Saint-Louis Church was built by two architects, Louis Métezeau, who drew up the plans before 1607, and Father Étienne Martellange, who oversaw the completion of the work after 1612. The church forms the south side of the “Cour des classes”, also known as the “Cour de Sébastopol”, and is supported by other buildings at its east and west ends, without a portal. It has a simple Latin cross plan, with a single nave flanked by ten side chapels. The five-sided apse opens directly onto the transept, without an intermediate bay, which breaks with the traditional Gothic plan. The church has three storeys: the side chapels are surmounted by a tribune, then by high windows. The non-communicating side chapels open into the nave via a semicircular arch. Above, the tribunes communicate with each other via open passages between the dividing walls, and are extended into the transept arms by passageways leading to the choir. The nave's roof, designed by Saumur architects Jean and Olivier Guibert, features Angevin-style rib vaults. The Saint-Louis church thus bears witness to the architectural evolution of the early 17th century, in a transitional style between the Gothic elevation of the nave and the Italian influence of the building plan.

The nave's decoration is limited to the angels sculpted in relief in the arcade spandrels and the royal symbols on the frieze. The whiteness of the tufa stone on the walls and vault, and the nave's high windows with their uncolored stained glass, give the church a generous amount of light.

The chapel's framework, completed in 1613 by Fléchois carpenter Guillaume Malteste, supports a lead campanile, composed of two superimposed lanterns. Swept away by a tornado in 1725, it was rebuilt on an enlarged base. Built behind the church chevet, the “stone tower” houses the bell tower. Raised in 1729, this octagonal tower connects the chapel to the Prytanée's “Court of Honor”.

On the outside, only two facades are visible: the south facade, facing the street, and the north facade, facing the “Cour des classes”. The chapel's elevation is punctuated by the buttress walls separating the chapels.

== Interior elements ==
=== Choir and altarpiece ===
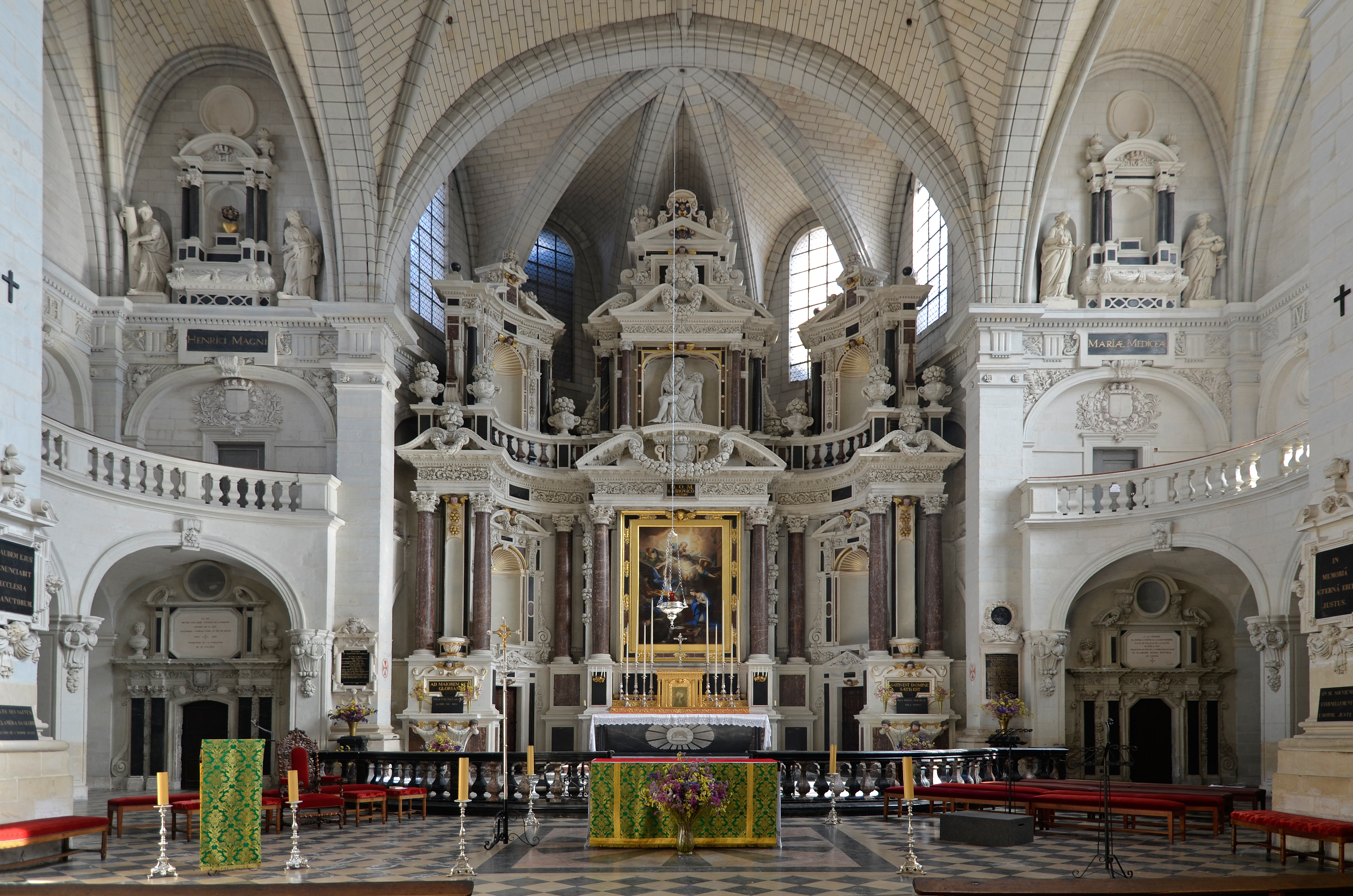
Baroque choir altarpiece.

The Lavallois altarpiece, richly decorated in the Baroque style, contrasts with the sobriety and whiteness of the nave. It is a monumental two-storey work in polychrome marble, executed by Laval architect Pierre Corbineau from 1633. The altarpiece comprises a central body and two curved wings that follow the shape of the apse. Its imposing size completely blocks the view of the apse. The central body is adorned with a painting by Jean Restout depicting the Annunciation. This painting, sometimes attributed to Jean Jouvenet, was installed around 1819 and is listed as a historical monument. Of the five niches surrounding this central motif, only the central niche has retained its statue, a 19th-century Virgin of Pity by Fléchois sculptor Callixte Coudret. The other four niches once housed statues of Saint Peter, Saint Paul, Charlemagne, and Saint Louis.

In addition to the high altarpiece, the choir's decoration was enhanced in 1693 by the addition of a communion table, donated by the Marquis René de la Varenne, whose rounded shape recalls that of the gallery balustrades, and by a polychrome marble pavement, using black marble from Sablé and pink marble from Laval. A stoup and the baptismal font are also in black Sablé marble. On either side of the main altar, two plaques honor the memory of two former students of the Collège Royal, philosopher René Descartes and marshal Jean-Baptiste Budes de Guébriant.

=== Organ and gallery ===
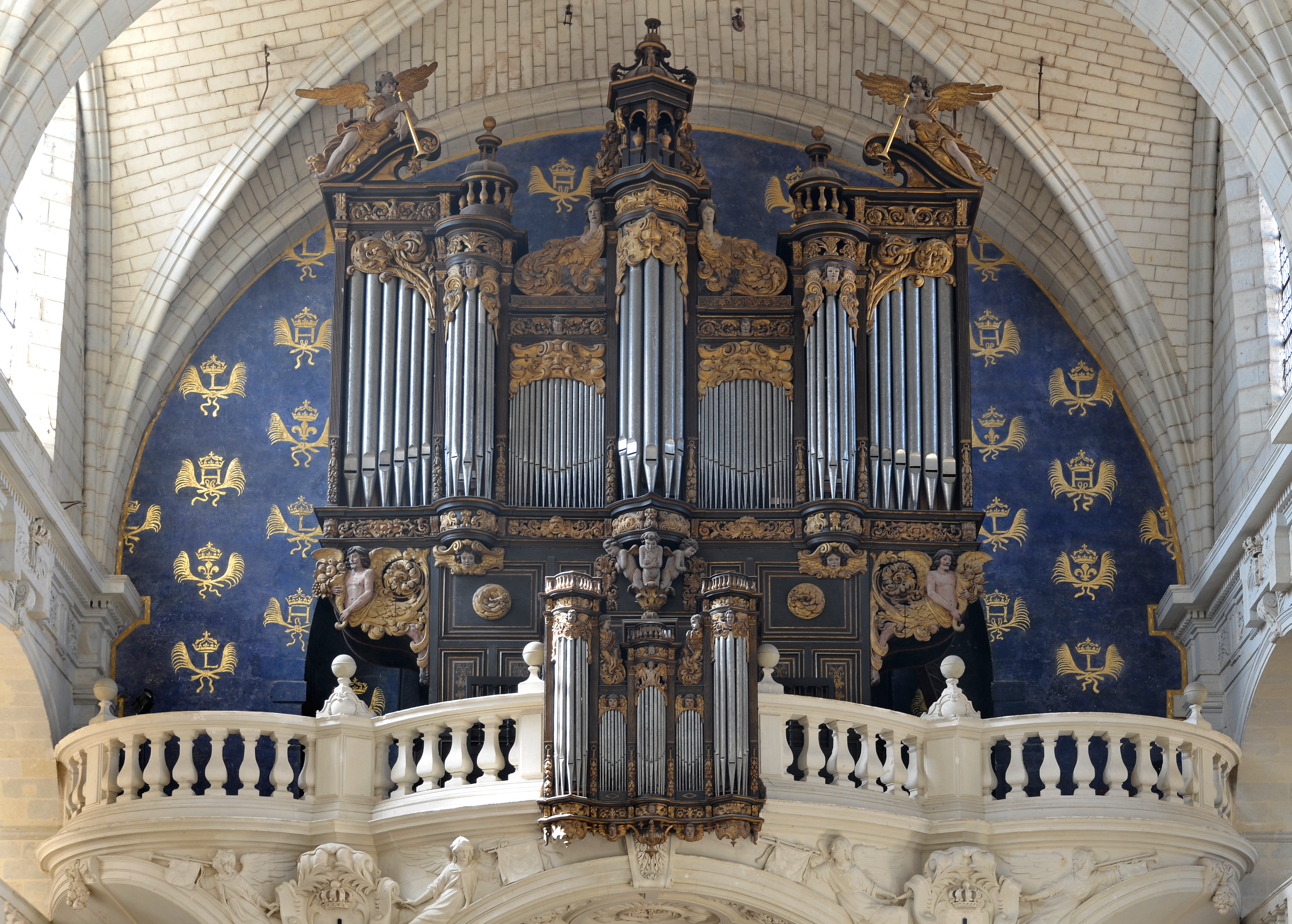
The organ loft at the west end of the nave.

At the west end of the nave, the organ loft consists of a central low-arched bay and two conical trumpets. The whole rests on two square pillars adorned with atlantes. Commissioned in 1637 to Fléchois architect Jacques Nadreau, the organ loft took three years to build. The organ, whose builder is unknown, consists of two parts: a positive set into the central balcony of the gallery, and a Grand orgue set against the nave wall. The musical part of the organ has 2,400 pipes, some of which date back to the 17th century. The organ case was built in 1638 by Angevin carpenters Pierre Frileux and Pierre Cornet in a Baroque style, with an abundance of wood carvings of angels, mascarons, foliage, and horns of plenty. The wall decoration behind the organ features gilded fleurs-de-lys and the monograms of kings Henri IV and Louis XIII, surmounted by a crown, on a blue background.

The organ was modified in 1655 by Flemish organ builder Guillaume Hermans, then restored and enlarged with a fourth manual in 1772 by Jean Dangeville, before being looted during the French Revolution. An appeal for its restoration was launched in the 1930s. The organ case and the instrumental part of the organ were classified as historic monuments in 1933, and the organ was restored between 1935 and 1947 by Victor Gonzalez. From July 1 to July 4, 2012, organist David Ponsford records François Couperin's Messe à l'usage des paroisses, pour les fêtes solennelles (1690) and Marc-Antoine Charpentier's Messe pour plusieurs instruments au lieu des orgues (1674?) H.513 (organ transcription by David Ponsford). CD Nimbus NI6225 (2013).

=== Royal cenotaphs ===
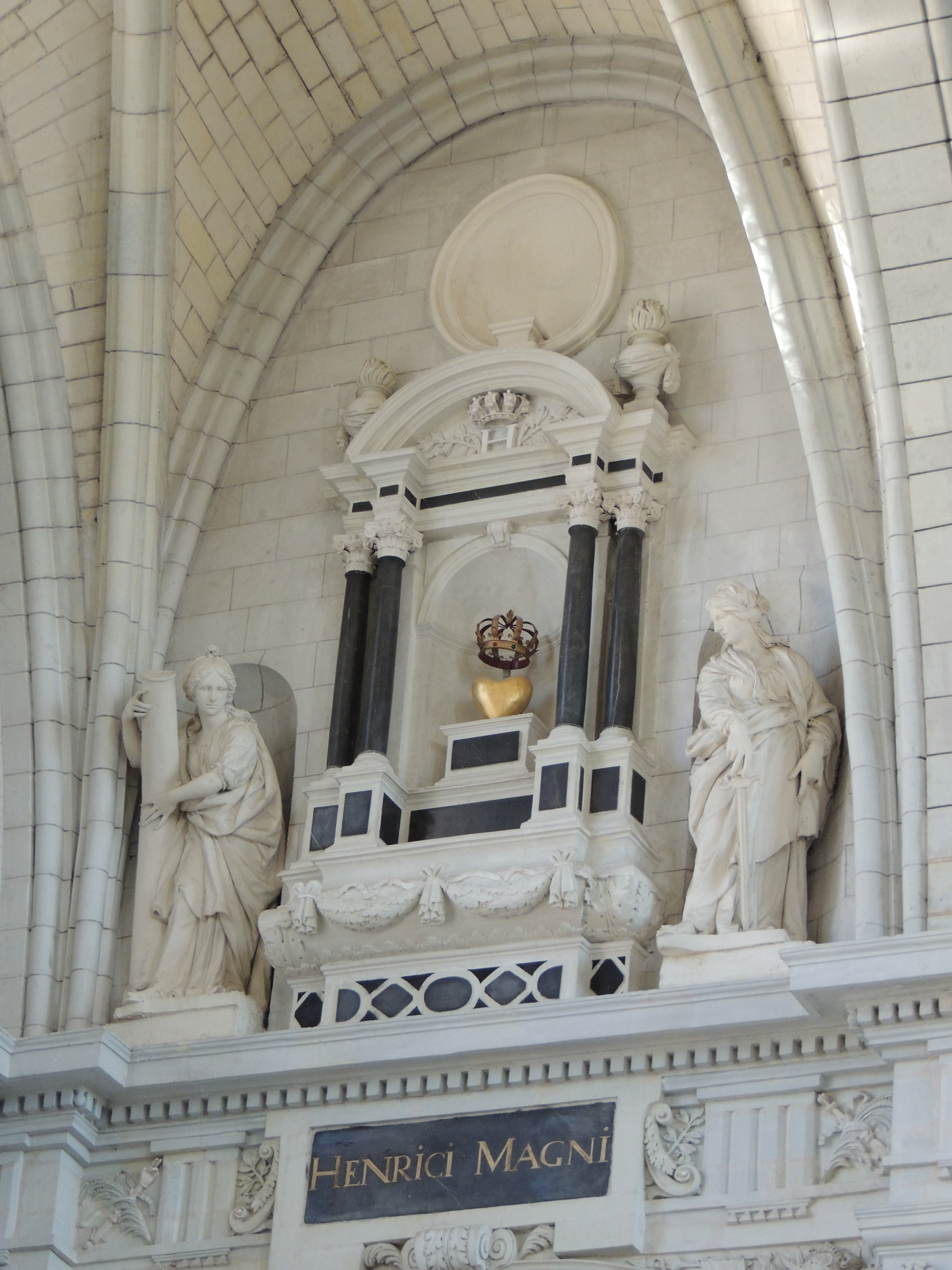
Henri IV's cenotaph, in the north arm of the transept.

In the edict founding the college, Henri IV pledged his heart and that of Queen Marie de Médicis to the Jesuits, to be laid to rest in the church of Saint-Louis. A mausoleum project was drawn up by architect Louis Métezeau, but was eventually abandoned after his death, and replaced by two more modest constructions on the transept arms dating from 1648. In the north arm, Henri IV's cenotaph is adorned with four black marble Corinthian columns supporting a curved pediment inscribed with the king's monogram. These columns frame a cul-de-four niche in which the metal urn containing the heart is perched on a pedestal. The cenotaph is framed by two statues and underlined by the inscription Henrici magni on a black marble plaque. In the south arm of the transept, the construction of Marie de Médicis' cenotaph is identical.

Since the visit to La Flèche of the representative Didier Thirion, which led to the burning of the royal hearts in 1793, the ashes of the two hearts have been grouped together in the urn adorning the cenotaph of Henri IV, leaving the second cenotaph empty.

=== Chapel decoration ===
The four chapels closest to the choir retain the enclosure that separated them from the nave. The enclosures consist of a round-arched door flanked by four marble columns on each side, topped by a triangular pediment. The altarpiece and enclosure of the chapel of Saint Ignatius of Loyola, located on the south side of the nave, were designed in 1621 by Laval architect Jean Martinet. In 1623, he decorated the adjacent chapel dedicated to Saint Francis Xavier.

On the opposite side of the nave, the Notre-Dame chapel was completed in 1633 by Pierre Corbineau, who also designed the altarpiece for the main altar. Around 1655, the Jesuits again commissioned Corbineau to create the altarpiece for the Saint-Joseph chapel, located next to the Notre-Dame chapel. The decoration of the church's other chapels spanned the second half of the 17th century.

=== Paintings ===
The Saint-Louis chapel boasts a remarkable collection of paintings. The Martyrdom of the Machabees, painted in 1715 by Bouard and brought back from Rome by the Jesuits, is a work of imposing dimensions at five meters wide. Listed as a historical monument in 2002, it was restored in 2011. A Descent from the Cross, painted in 1777 by Nicolas-Bernard Lépicié, is also listed as a historic monument. The painting is a copy of a late seventeenth-century work by Jean Jouvenet in the Musée du Louvre.

== See also ==
- Collège Henri-IV
- Prytanée national militaire
- La Flèche

== Bibliography ==
- Clère, Jules (1853). Histoire de l'École de La Flèche [History of the École de La Flèche] (in French). E. Jourdain.
- Rochemonteix, Camille. Un collège de Jésuites au xviie et xviiie siècles : Le Collège Henri IV de La Flèche [A Jesuit college in the 17th and 18th centuries: Le Collège Henri IV de La Flèche] (in French). Leguicheux.
- Giraud, Chanoine; Dufourcq, Norbert; Raugel, Félix; Miramon Fitz-James, Bérenger (1933). Le Prytanée militaire, sa chapelle, son orgue [The Prytanée Militaire, its chapel and organ] (in French). PLC.
- Moisy, Pierre (1958). Les Églises des Jésuites de l'ancienne assistance de France [The Jesuit Churches of the former Assistance de France] (in French). IHSI.
- Salbert, Jacques (1961). La Chapelle Saint-Louis du collège des Jésuites de La Flèche en Anjou [The Saint-Louis Chapel at the Jesuit College in La Flèche, Anjou] (in French). Vol. 68. Annales de Bretagne.
- Moisy, Pierre (1964). "La chapelle du collège des jésuites de La Flèche" [The chapel of the Jesuit College in La Flèche]. Congrès archéologique de France [French Archaeological Congress] (in French). Paris: Société française d'archéologie.
- Dufourcq, Norbert (1964). Le grand orgue de la chapelle Saint-Louis du Prytanée militaire de La Flèche [The great organ in the Saint-Louis chapel of the Prytanée militaire de La Flèche] (in French). Paris: Picard.
- Schilte, Pierre (1980). La Flèche intra-muros (in French). Farré.
- Beaupère, Bernard (1985). Histoire du Prytanée national militaire [History of the Prytanée national militaire] (in French). Paris: Charles-Lavauzelle. ISBN 2-7025-0102-8.
- Le Bœuf, François; Lasa, François (1995). La Flèche - Le Prytanée, Sarthe [La Flèche - The Prytanée, Sarthe]. Images du Patrimoine (in French) (147 ed.). Association pour le développement de l'Inventaire général des Pays de la Loire. ISBN 2-906344-48-6.
- Collectif (2004). Du Collège royal au Prytanée militaire : 1604–2004 Quatre cents ans d'éducation à La Flèche [From the Collège royal to the Prytanée militaire: 1604-2004 Four hundred years of education in La Flèche] (in French). Association Amicale des Anciens Élèves du Prytanée Militaire.
- Chanteloup, Luc; Aubert, Claude (2004). Les trésors du Prytanée national militaire de La Flèche [The treasures of the Prytanée National Militaire de La Flèche] (in French). La Reinette: La Reinette. ISBN 2-913566-22-7.
