= François Huguet =

French architect

François Huguet was a 17h–18th-century French architect. He died around 1730.

== François Huguet ==
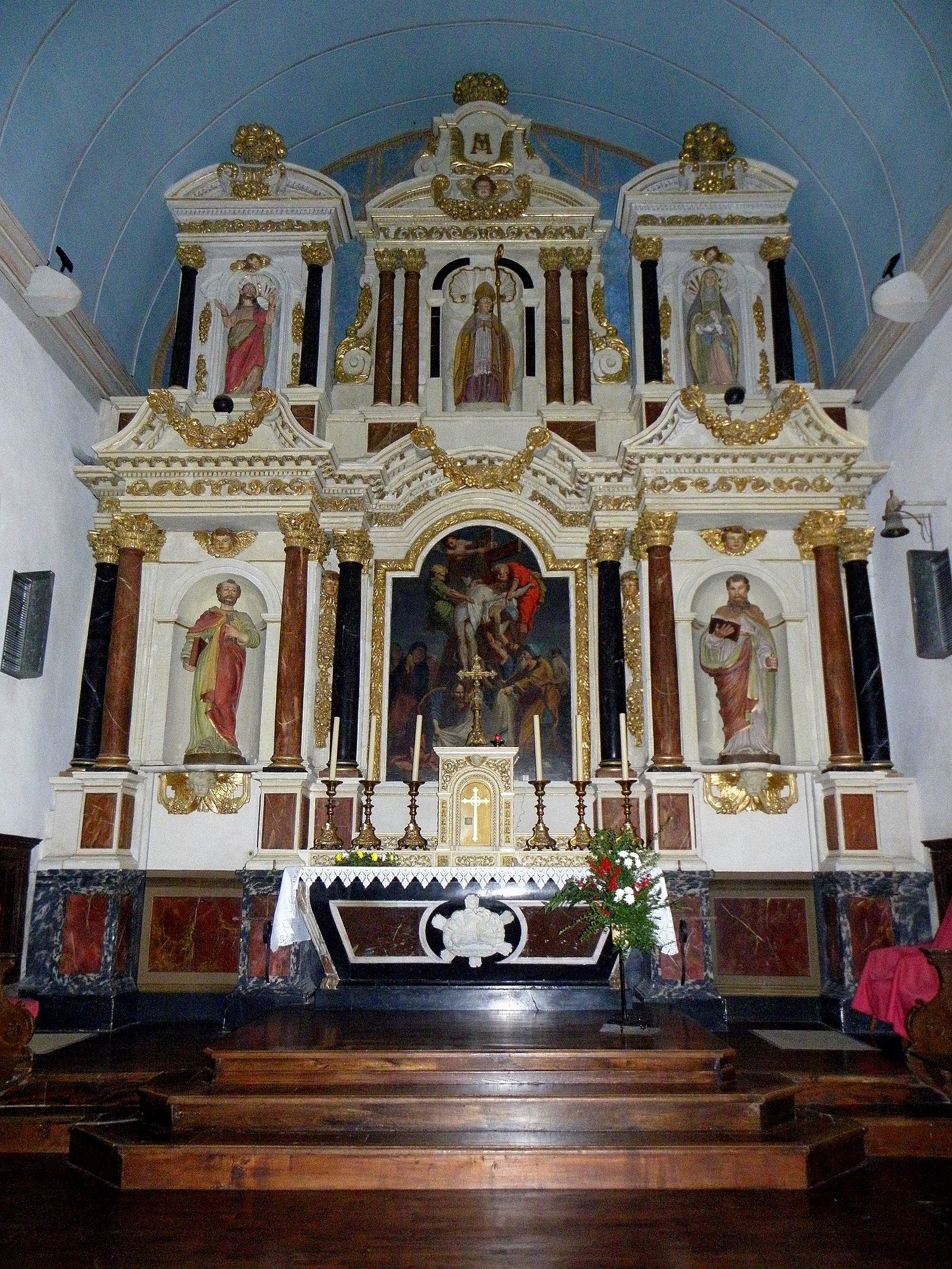
The main altar of the Saint-Marse de Bais church and its Laval altarpiece.

Son-in-law of François Houdault, in 1686, he took over the general layout of the Laval altarpieces of the Corbineau and Houdault families in Boistrudan. For Jacques Salbert, it is possible that the main altar of the église Saint-Marse de Bais also belongs to his work.

Huguet completed the coronation of the towers of the Rennes Cathedral between 1679 and 1704, bringing them to their current height of 48 metres and added the motto of Louis XIV, (Nec pluribus impar, the incomparable) on the pediment at the top of the facade.

The construction of the new église Saint-Sauveur de Rennes took place throughout the 18th century. Huguet decided on an opposite orientation to the previous one. The first campaign of work from 1703 to 1718 began with the choir and the crossing of the transept. After the 1720 fire in Rennes, these parts will be restored between 1721 and 1724.

== Bibliography ==
- Jules-Marie Richard, Les constructeurs de retables, Société d'archéologie et d'histoire de la Mayenne, 1906.
- Jacques Salbert, Ateliers de retabliers Lavallois aux XVIIe et XVIIIe siècles: Études historiques et artistiques, Presses Universitaires de Rennes, 1976.
