= Tugal Caris =

French sculptor and architect

Tugal Caris (active 1630 – 1666), also spelled Carris or Cariste, was a 17th-century French ecclesiastical sculptor and ecclesiastical architect who worked in Nantes and Rennes. He was one of the creators of elaborate altarpieces in a new style invented by sculptors from Laval.

== Biography ==
Caris was born in the late sixteenth or early seventeenth century, and was from Laval; in 1630 there is a record of him living there. He later moved to Rennes and died in Nantes.

He married Jeanne Barais, probably the sister of Catherine Barais, wife of the architect Michel Bellier. One of their children, Jacques Caris, also became an architect in Nantes.

== Altarpieces ==
His first known commission for an altar was at Vaiges in 1634; this is no longer extant. The altars in the church of St Denis at Saint-Denis-du-Maine (1632) and in St Peter's at Nuillé-sur-Ouette (1633) can probably also be attributed to him. From 1634 to 1636, he created the altarpiece at Redon Abbey.

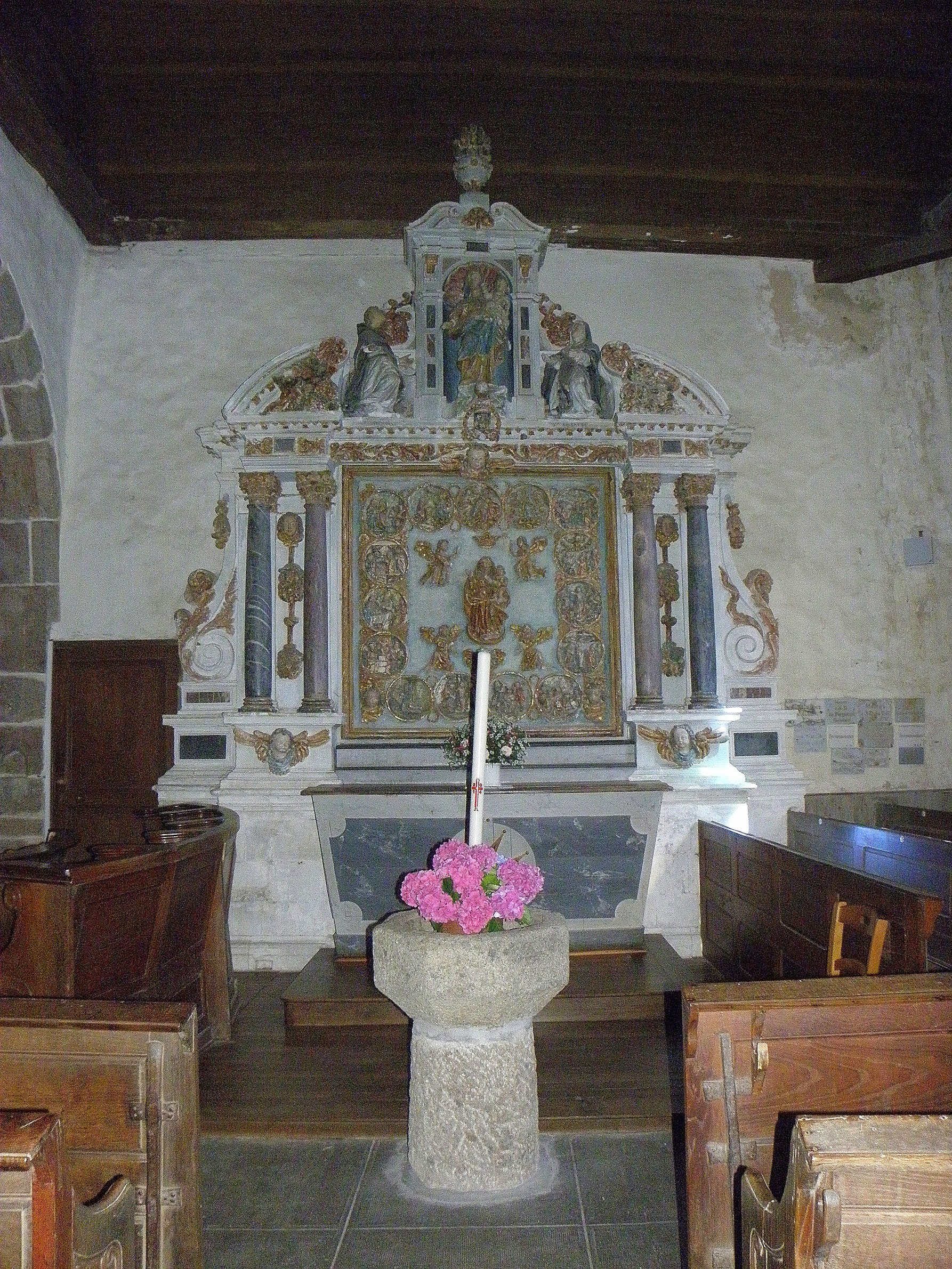
Altarpiece of the Rosary of St. Martin's church, Chatillon-sur-Colmont

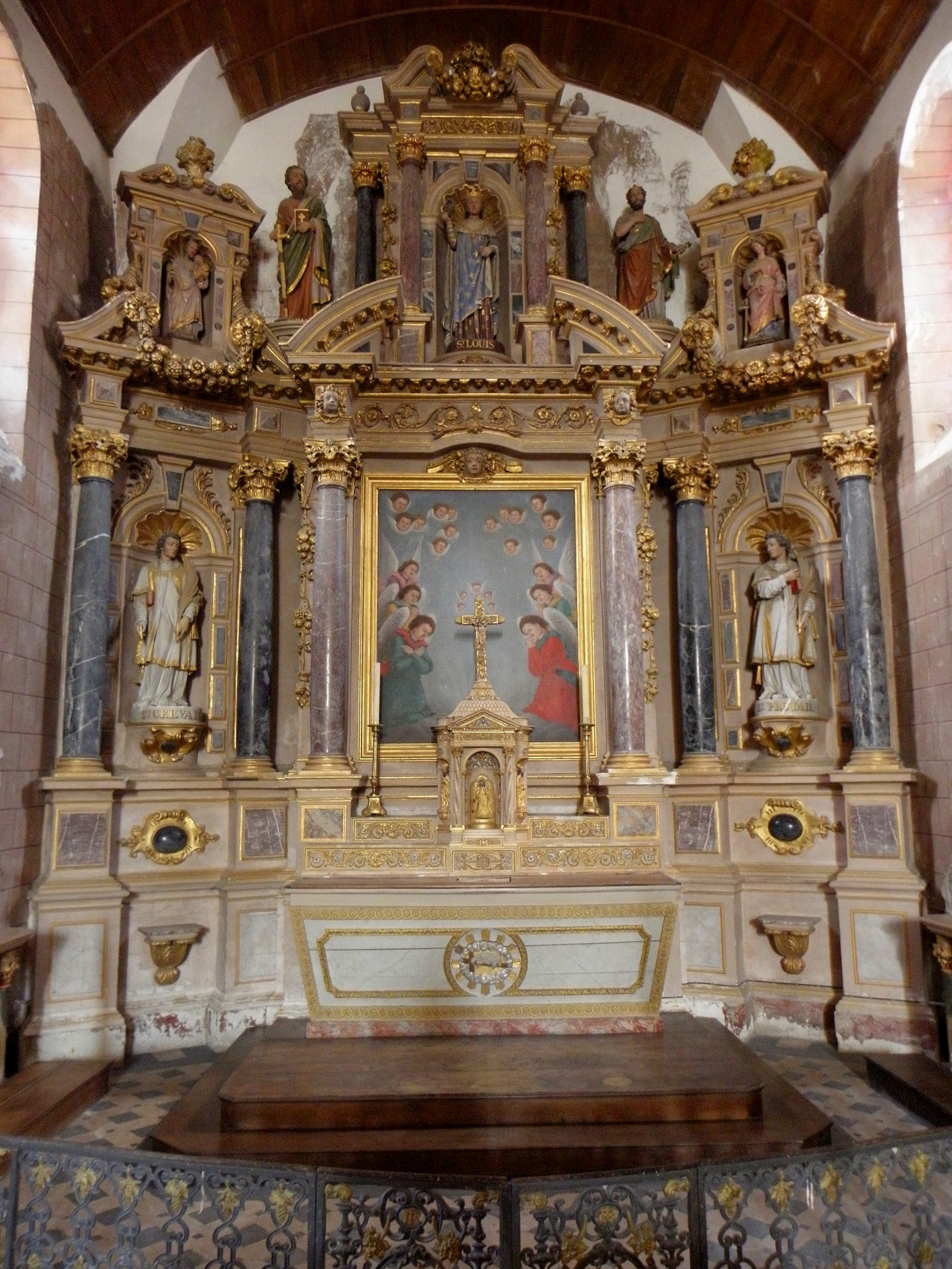
Main altar with altarpiece attributed to Caris, Brée

Caris's most important altarpieces were created while he was living in Rennes. In 1642 he is believed to have created the high altar ensemble with side altars in the church at Availles-sur-Seiche, as well as the altarpiece at Rannée. The altarpiece of the high altar of the church at Tinténiac may also be his work. In 1651 he was responsible for the main altarpiece at Gaël.

Caris's altarpieces are relatively restrained in their ornamentation compared to those of other sculptors in the Laval school, such as Pierre Corbineau and his son Gilles, and the Houdault family.

== Architect at Rennes and Nantes ==
In 1640, his reputation in Brittany led the chapter of Rennes Cathedral to engage him to oversee the completion of the façade, and he worked there until 1654, when Pierre Corbineau took over; according to Léon Palustre, Caris directed the work as far as the cornice on the first floor.

In 1648 he left Rennes for Nantes, where in 1656 he was contracted to oversee work on the cathedral.
