= Rennes Cathedral =

French church

Rennes Cathedral Cathédrale Saint-Pierre
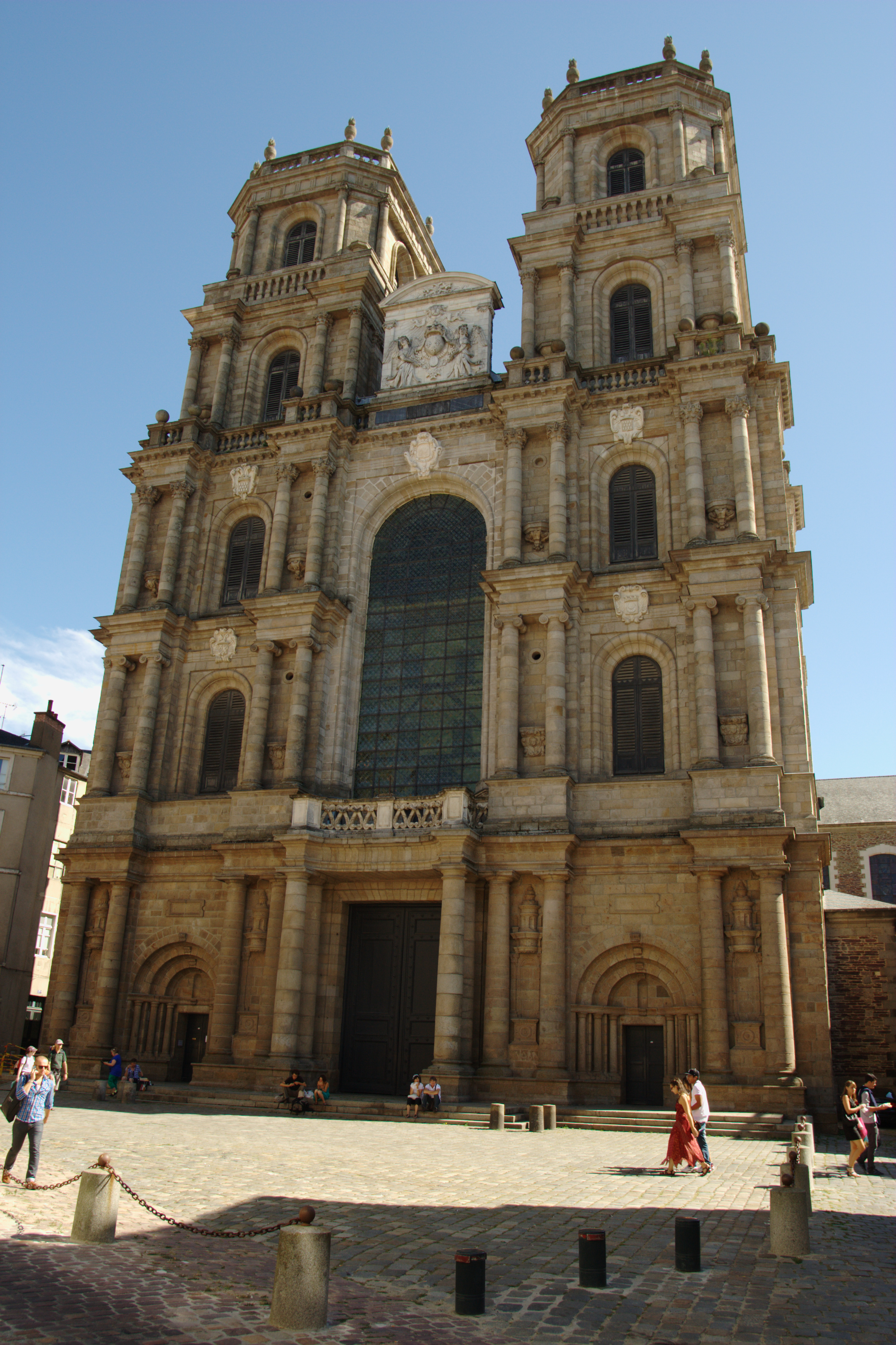
- Rennes Cathedral

Religion
- Affiliation: Roman Catholic Church
- Diocese: Archdiocese of Rennes, Dol, and Saint-Malo
- Rite: Roman
- Ecclesiastical or organizational status: Cathedral

Location
- Location: Rennes, France
- Interactive map of Rennes Cathedral; Cathédrale Saint-Pierre
- Coordinates: 48°06′41″N 1°41′00″W

Architecture
- Type: Church
- Style: Neoclassical, Gothic
- Completed: 1845

Rennes Cathedral (French: Cathédrale Saint-Pierre de Rennes; Breton: Iliz-veur Roazhon) is a Roman Catholic church located in the town of Rennes, France. It has been a monument historique since 1906. The cathedral, dedicated to Saint Peter, is the seat of the Archbishop of Rennes, Dol, and Saint-Malo, previously Bishop of Rennes.

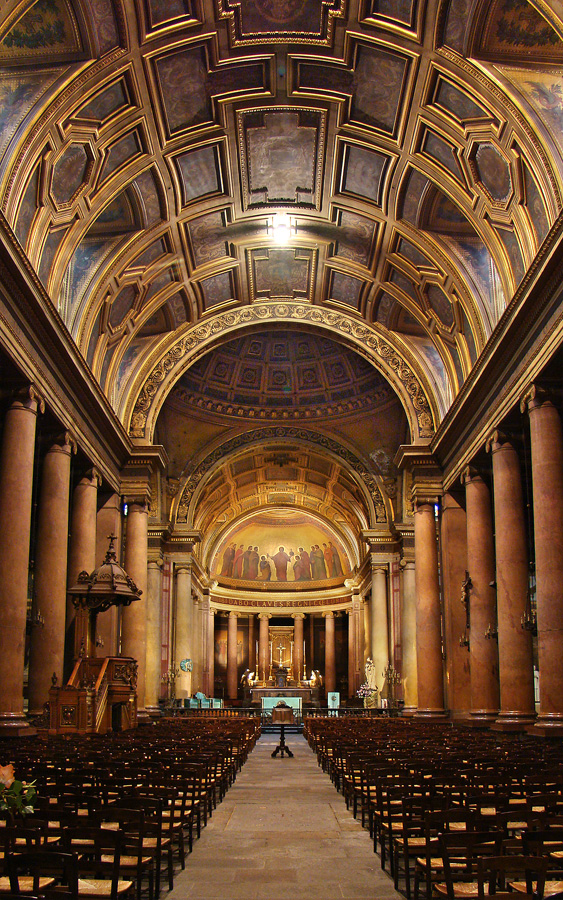
Rennes Cathedral nave

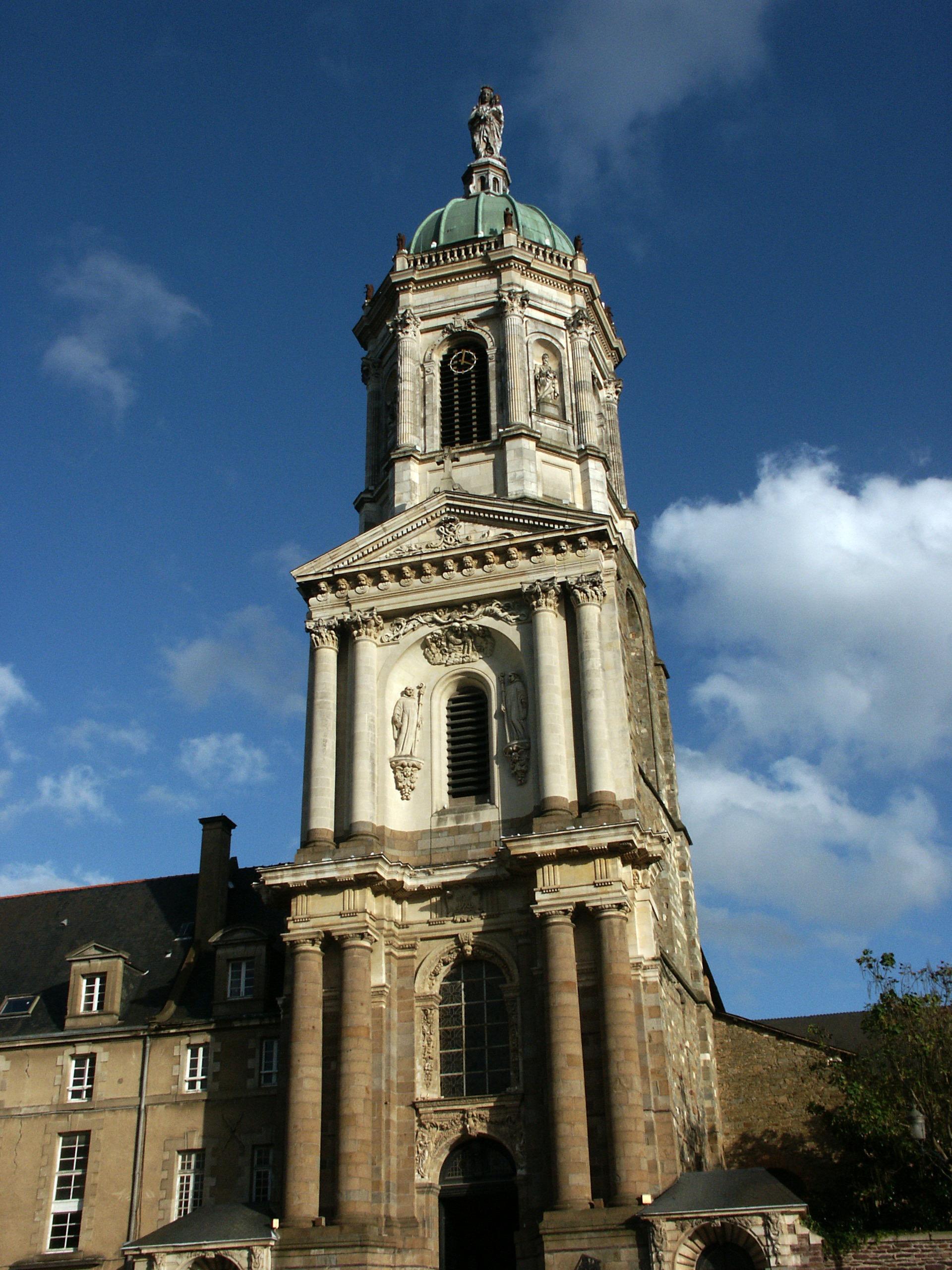
Notre-Dame en Saint-Melaine, Pro-Cathedral of Rennes

== Building history ==
The site has been used for a cathedral more or less from the beginnings of the see in the 6th century. The earliest building was completely replaced by a Gothic cathedral in the 12th century, of which in 1490 the tower and the entire west front collapsed. The existing façade with its neoclassical granite towers in four stages was constructed over the next two centuries or so, with long gaps between the different stages: the lowest level was built between 1541 and 1543, the second from 1640 to 1654 (by Tugal Caris), and the fourth (by Pierre Corbineau) from 1654 to 1678. Yet another architect, François Hoguet, completed the towers, between 1679 and 1704, at their present height of 48 metres and added the device of Louis XVI between them.

The nave and choir however had not been restored. During vespers on 11 February 1754 a great stone fell from the roof of the choir, and it was decided, before the entire body of the cathedral collapsed, to demolish all these parts and rebuild them. The demolition was carried out between 1756 and 1768, leaving only the towers and west front standing. Rebuilding began in 1787, shortly after which the French Revolution began and all work was suspended. It did not recommence until 1816, initially under the supervision of the architect Mathurin Crucy. He died in 1826; the work was continued under the local architect Louis Richelot, and finished in 1845.

The original decoration was in a plain neo-classical style, but during the 19th century it was extensively refurbished with gilt, stucco and paintings (inspired by those in the Parliament of Rennes) to create a more sumptuous appearance. Characteristic of this cathedral is the contrast between the rich decoration, including, in front of the altar, slabs of rare marble from the Roman Forum, a gift from Pope Pius IX, and the sombre granite of the structure.

In Rennes Cathedral on December 25, 1483 Henry Tudor, the future Henry VII of England, then in exile in Brittany, promised to marry Elizabeth of York in order to rally the army that remained loyal to the late Edward IV. This marriage, which took place in 1486, sealed the end of the Wars of the Roses and gave rise to the Tudor dynasty, which produced five sovereigns for England including the first two reigning queens Mary I and Elizabeth I.

== Pro-cathedral ==
Between 1803 and 1844, because the cathedral was unusable, the abbey church of Our Lady in Saint Melaine of Rennes (French: Notre-Dame-en-Saint-Melaine de Rennes) served as a pro-cathedral (i.e. a substitute).

This church is dedicated to Saint Melaine, traditionally the first Bishop of Rennes, buried here in the 6th century. The present buildings were constructed in the 17th century, and were badly damaged during World War II.
