= Anché =

Anché is the name of the following communes in France:

- Anché, Indre-et-Loire, in the Indre-et-Loir department
- Anché, Vienne, in the Vienne department
