= Braye-sous-Faye =

- Commune
- Location of Braye-sous-Faye
- Location within France Location within Centre-Val de Loire
- Coordinates: 46°59′32″N 0°20′51″E
- Country: France
- Region: Centre-Val de Loire
- Department: Indre-et-Loire
- Arrondissement: Chinon
- Canton: Sainte-Maure-de-Touraine

Government
  - Mayor (2020–2026): Patrick Devyver
- Area^{1}: 15.67 km^{2} (6.05 sq mi)
- Highest elevation: 102 m (335 ft)
- Lowest elevation: 54 m (177 ft)
- Population (2023): 281
  - Density: 17.9/km^{2} (46.4/sq mi)
- Time zone: UTC+01:00 (CET)
  - Summer (DST): UTC+02:00 (CEST)
- INSEE/Postal code: 37035 /37120
- ^{1} French Land Register data, which excludes lakes, ponds, glaciers > 1 km^{2} (0.386 sq mi or 247 acres) and river estuaries.

Braye-sous-Faye (French pronunciation: [bʁɛ su fɛ], literally Braye under Faye) is a commune in the Indre-et-Loire department in central France.

== Population ==
Historical population
Year	Pop.	±% p.a.
1968	297	—
1975	294	−0.14%
1982	307	+0.62%
1990	349	+1.62%
1999	368	+0.59%
2007	328	−1.43%
2012	328	+0.00%
2017	310	−1.12%
2023	281	−1.62%
Source: INSEE

== See also ==
- Communes of the Indre-et-Loire department
