= Arrondissement of Chinon =

Coordinates: 47°10′N 0°14′E

Chinon
- Arrondissement
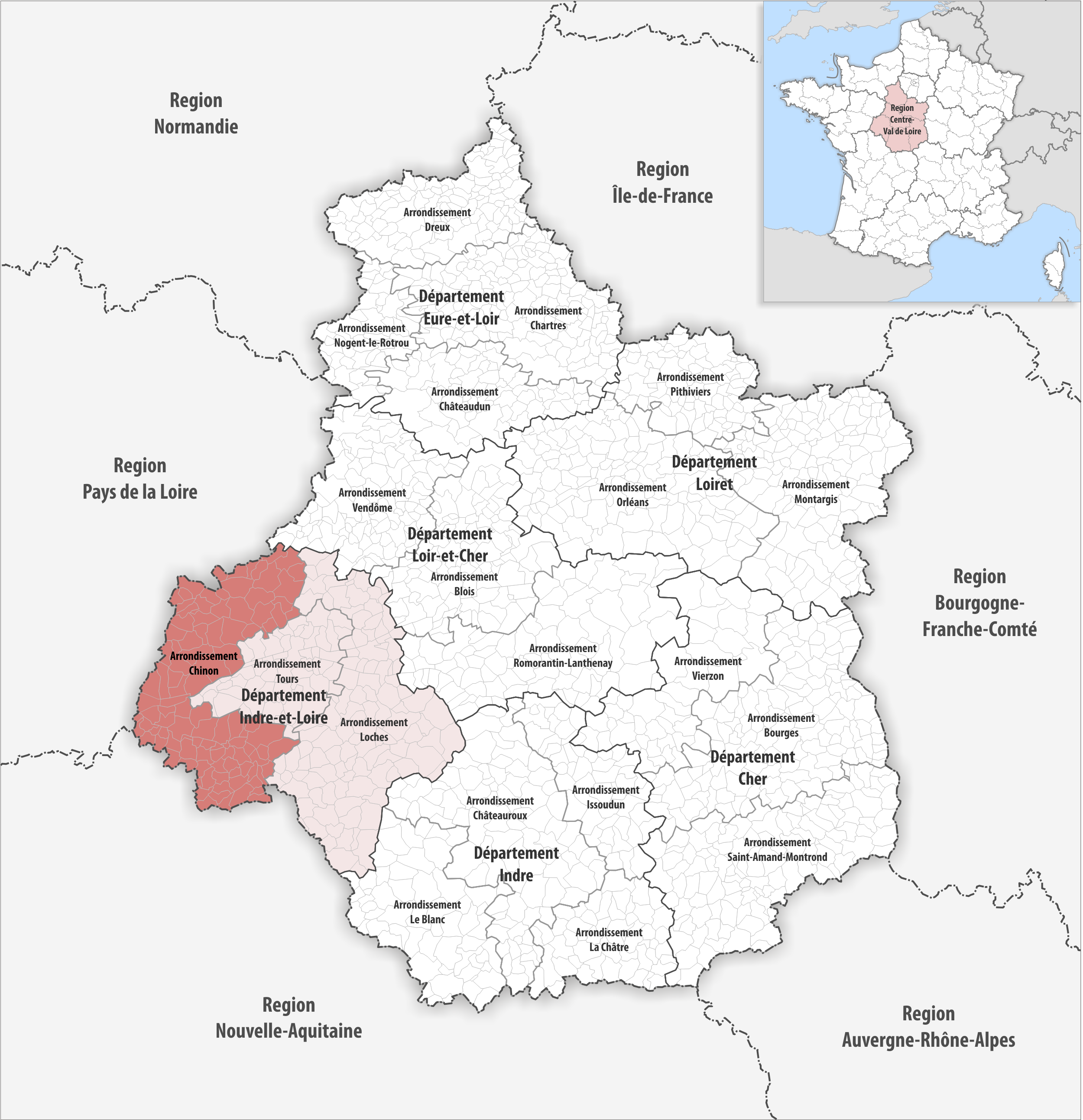
- Location within the region Centre-Val de Loire
- Country: France
- Region: Centre-Val de Loire
- Department: Indre-et-Loire
- No. of communes: {{{nbcomm}}}
- Area: 2,296.5 km^{2} (886.7 sq mi)
- Population (2023): 104,349
  - Density: 45.438/km^{2} (117.68/sq mi)
- INSEE code: 371

The arrondissement of Chinon is an arrondissement of France in the Indre-et-Loire department in the Centre-Val de Loire region. It has 106 communes. Its population is 103,540 (2021), and its area is 2,296.5 km^{2} (886.7 sq mi).

== Composition ==
The communes of the arrondissement of Chinon, and their INSEE codes, are:

1. Ambillou (37002)
2. Anché (37004)
3. Antogny-le-Tillac (37005)
4. Assay (37007)
5. Avoine (37011)
6. Avon-les-Roches (37012)
7. Avrillé-les-Ponceaux (37013)
8. Beaumont-en-Véron (37022)
9. Beaumont-Louestault (37021)
10. Benais (37024)
11. Bourgueil (37031)
12. Braslou (37034)
13. Braye-sous-Faye (37035)
14. Braye-sur-Maulne (37036)
15. Brèches (37037)
16. Brizay (37040)
17. Bueil-en-Touraine (37041)
18. Candes-Saint-Martin (37042)
19. Cerelles (37047)
20. Champigny-sur-Veude (37051)
21. Channay-sur-Lathan (37055)
22. La Chapelle-sur-Loire (37058)
23. Charentilly (37059)
24. Château-la-Vallière (37062)
25. Chaveignes (37065)
26. Chemillé-sur-Dême (37068)
27. Chezelles (37071)
28. Chinon (37072)
29. Chouzé-sur-Loire (37074)
30. Cinais (37076)
31. Cinq-Mars-la-Pile (37077)
32. Cléré-les-Pins (37081)
33. Continvoir (37082)
34. Coteaux-sur-Loire (37232)
35. Couesmes (37084)
36. Courcelles-de-Touraine (37086)
37. Courcoué (37087)
38. Couziers (37088)
39. Cravant-les-Côteaux (37089)
40. Crissay-sur-Manse (37090)
41. Crouzilles (37093)
42. Épeigné-sur-Dême (37101)
43. Faye-la-Vineuse (37105)
44. Gizeux (37112)
45. Hommes (37117)
46. Huismes (37118)
47. L'Île-Bouchard (37119)
48. Jaulnay (37121)
49. Langeais (37123)
50. Lémeré (37125)
51. Lerné (37126)
52. Ligré (37129)
53. Lublé (37137)
54. Luzé (37140)
55. Maillé (37142)
56. Marçay (37144)
57. Marcilly-sur-Maulne (37146)
58. Marcilly-sur-Vienne (37147)
59. Marigny-Marmande (37148)
60. Marray (37149)
61. Mazières-de-Touraine (37150)
62. Neuil (37165)
63. Neuillé-Pont-Pierre (37167)
64. Neuvy-le-Roi (37170)
65. Nouâtre (37174)
66. Noyant-de-Touraine (37176)
67. Panzoult (37178)
68. Parçay-sur-Vienne (37180)
69. Pernay (37182)
70. Ports-sur-Vienne (37187)
71. Pouzay (37188)
72. Pussigny (37190)
73. Razines (37191)
74. Restigné (37193)
75. Richelieu (37196)
76. Rillé (37198)
77. Rilly-sur-Vienne (37199)
78. Rivière (37201)
79. La Roche-Clermault (37202)
80. Rouziers-de-Touraine (37204)
81. Saint-Antoine-du-Rocher (37206)
82. Saint-Aubin-le-Dépeint (37207)
83. Saint-Benoît-la-Forêt (37210)
84. Saint-Christophe-sur-le-Nais (37213)
85. Sainte-Maure-de-Touraine (37226)
86. Saint-Épain (37216)
87. Saint-Germain-sur-Vienne (37220)
88. Saint-Laurent-de-Lin (37223)
89. Saint-Nicolas-de-Bourgueil (37228)
90. Saint-Paterne-Racan (37231)
91. Saint-Roch (37237)
92. Savigné-sur-Lathan (37241)
93. Savigny-en-Véron (37242)
94. Sazilly (37244)
95. Semblançay (37245)
96. Seuilly (37248)
97. Sonzay (37249)
98. Souvigné (37251)
99. Tavant (37255)
100. Theneuil (37256)
101. Thizay (37258)
102. La Tour-Saint-Gelin (37260)
103. Trogues (37262)
104. Verneuil-le-Château (37268)
105. Villebourg (37274)
106. Villiers-au-Bouin (37279)

== History ==
The arrondissement of Chinon was created in 1800. At the January 2017 reorganisation of the arrondissements of Indre-et-Loire, it gained 34 communes from the arrondissement of Tours, and it lost 12 communes to the arrondissement of Tours.

As a result of the reorganisation of the cantons of France which came into effect in 2015, the borders of the cantons are no longer related to the borders of the arrondissements. The cantons of the arrondissement of Chinon were, as of January 2015:

1. Azay-le-Rideau
2. Bourgueil
3. Chinon
4. L'Île-Bouchard
5. Langeais
6. Richelieu
7. Sainte-Maure-de-Touraine
