= Chezelles =

Chezelles may refer to:

- Chezelles, Indre, in the Indre department
- Chezelles, Indre-et-Loire, in the Indre-et-Loire department

== See also ==
- Chezelle
