= Crouzilles =

- Commune
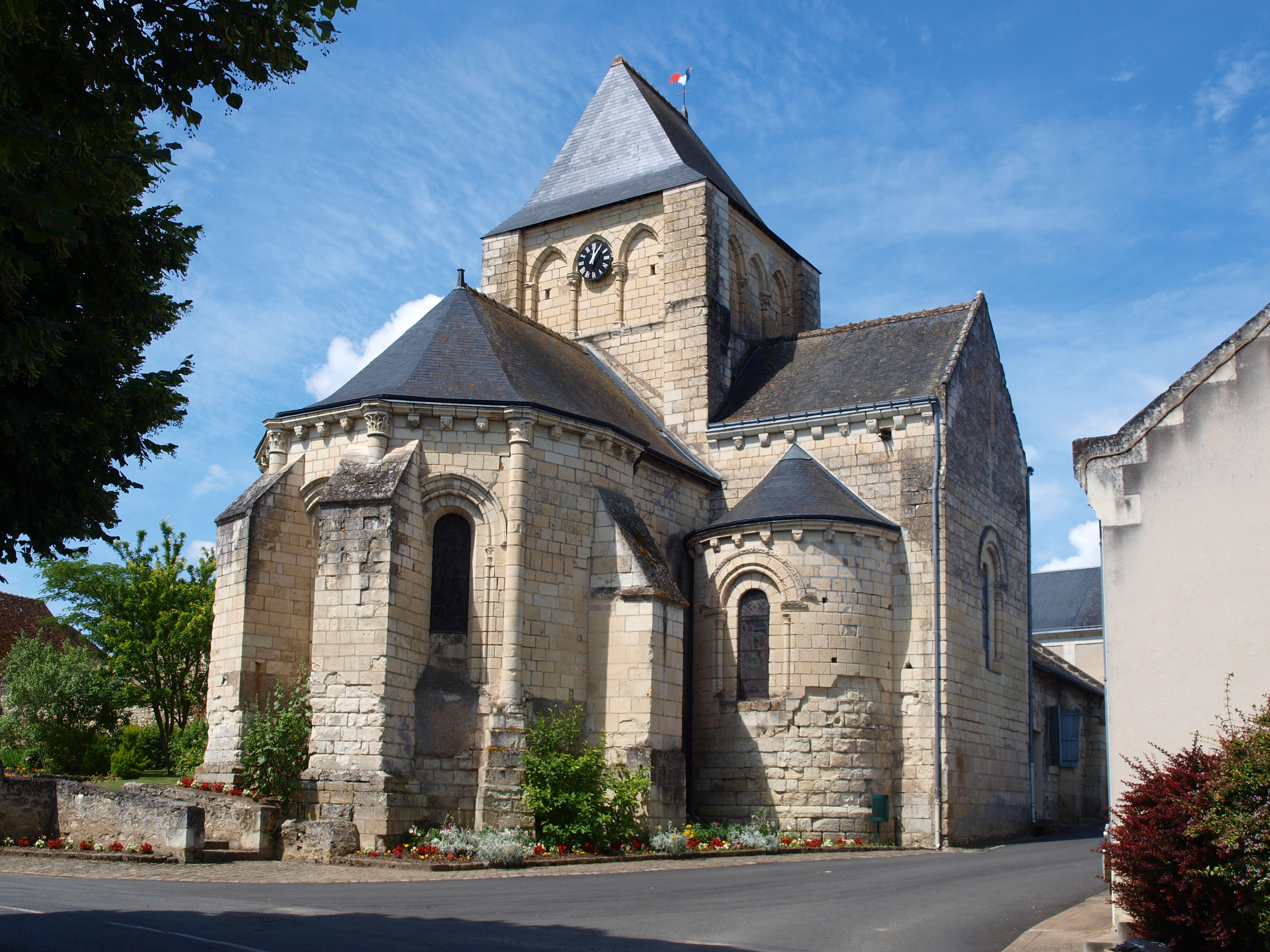
- The church in Crouzilles

- Coat of arms
- Location of Crouzilles
- Location within France Location within Centre-Val de Loire
- Coordinates: 47°07′28″N 0°27′37″E
- Country: France
- Region: Centre-Val de Loire
- Department: Indre-et-Loire
- Arrondissement: Chinon
- Canton: Sainte-Maure-de-Touraine

Government
  - Mayor (2020–2026): Daniel Brisseau
- Area^{1}: 14.54 km^{2} (5.61 sq mi)
- Highest elevation: 102 m (335 ft)
- Lowest elevation: 32 m (105 ft)
- Population (2023): 528
  - Density: 36.3/km^{2} (94.1/sq mi)
- Time zone: UTC+01:00 (CET)
  - Summer (DST): UTC+02:00 (CEST)
- INSEE/Postal code: 37093 /37220
- ^{1} French Land Register data, which excludes lakes, ponds, glaciers > 1 km^{2} (0.386 sq mi or 247 acres) and river estuaries.

Crouzilles (French pronunciation: [kʁuzij]) is a commune in the Indre-et-Loire department in central France.

== Population ==
Historical population
| Year | Pop. | ±% p.a. |
|---|---|---|
| 1968 | 619 | — |
| 1975 | 471 | −3.83% |
| 1982 | 453 | −0.56% |
| 1990 | 540 | +2.22% |
| 1999 | 519 | −0.44% |
| 2007 | 552 | +0.77% |
| 2012 | 564 | +0.43% |
| 2017 | 531 | −1.20% |
| 2023 | 528 | −0.09% |
Source: INSEE

== See also ==
- Communes of the Indre-et-Loire department
