= Lémeré =

- Commune
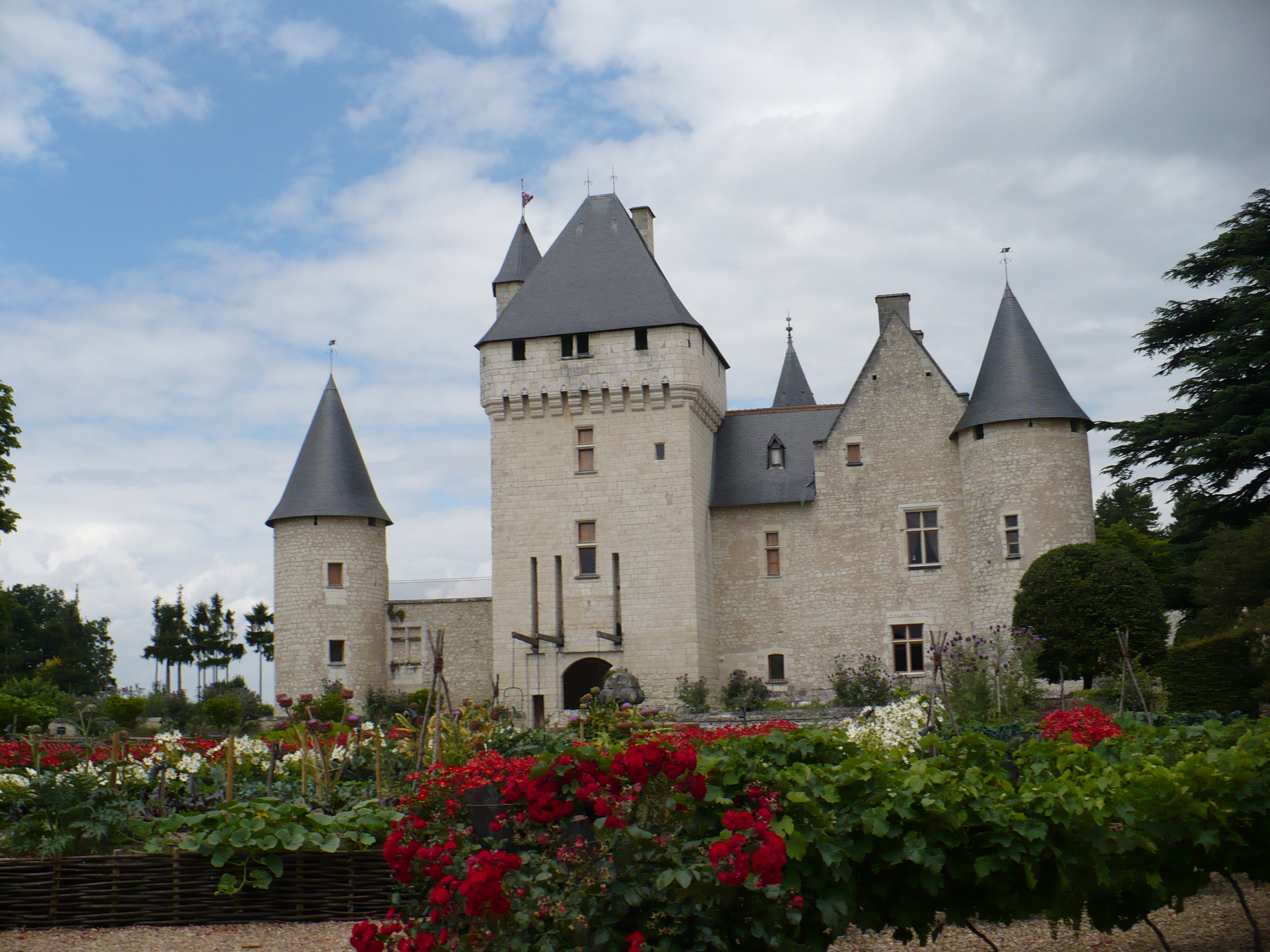
- Chateau of Rivau
- Location of Lémeré
- Location within France Location within Centre-Val de Loire
- Coordinates: 47°05′01″N 0°20′09″E
- Country: France
- Region: Centre-Val de Loire
- Department: Indre-et-Loire
- Arrondissement: Chinon
- Canton: Sainte-Maure-de-Touraine

Government
  - Mayor (2020–2026): Martine Juszczak
- Area^{1}: 19.83 km^{2} (7.66 sq mi)
- Highest elevation: 115 m (377 ft)
- Lowest elevation: 35 m (115 ft)
- Population (2023): 401
  - Density: 20.2/km^{2} (52.4/sq mi)
- Time zone: UTC+01:00 (CET)
  - Summer (DST): UTC+02:00 (CEST)
- INSEE/Postal code: 37125 /37120
- ^{1} French Land Register data, which excludes lakes, ponds, glaciers > 1 km^{2} (0.386 sq mi or 247 acres) and river estuaries.

Lémeré (French pronunciation: [lemʁe]) is a commune in the Indre-et-Loire department in central France.

== Population ==
Historical population
Year	Pop.	±% p.a.
1968	479	—
1975	436	−1.33%
1982	380	−1.94%
1990	365	−0.50%
1999	369	+0.12%
2007	401	+1.04%
2012	475	+3.45%
2017	518	+1.75%
2023	401	−4.18%
Source: INSEE

== See also ==
- Communes of the Indre-et-Loire department
