= Jaulnay =

- Commune
- Location of Jaulnay
- Location within France Location within Centre-Val de Loire
- Coordinates: 46°56′57″N 0°24′54″E
- Country: France
- Region: Centre-Val de Loire
- Department: Indre-et-Loire
- Arrondissement: Chinon
- Canton: Sainte-Maure-de-Touraine

Government
  - Mayor (2020–2026): Maurice Talland
- Area^{1}: 14.76 km^{2} (5.70 sq mi)
- Highest elevation: 134 m (440 ft)
- Lowest elevation: 65 m (213 ft)
- Population (2023): 243
  - Density: 16.5/km^{2} (42.6/sq mi)
- Time zone: UTC+01:00 (CET)
  - Summer (DST): UTC+02:00 (CEST)
- INSEE/Postal code: 37121 /37120
- ^{1} French Land Register data, which excludes lakes, ponds, glaciers > 1 km^{2} (0.386 sq mi or 247 acres) and river estuaries.

Jaulnay (French pronunciation: [ʒo(l)nɛ]) is a commune in the Indre-et-Loire department in central France.

== Population ==
Historical population
Year	Pop.	±% p.a.
1968	369	—
1975	301	−2.87%
1982	270	−1.54%
1990	290	+0.90%
1999	273	−0.67%
2007	252	−1.00%
2012	257	+0.39%
2017	258	+0.08%
2023	243	−0.99%
Source: INSEE

== See also ==
- Communes of the Indre-et-Loire department
