= Sazilly =

- Commune
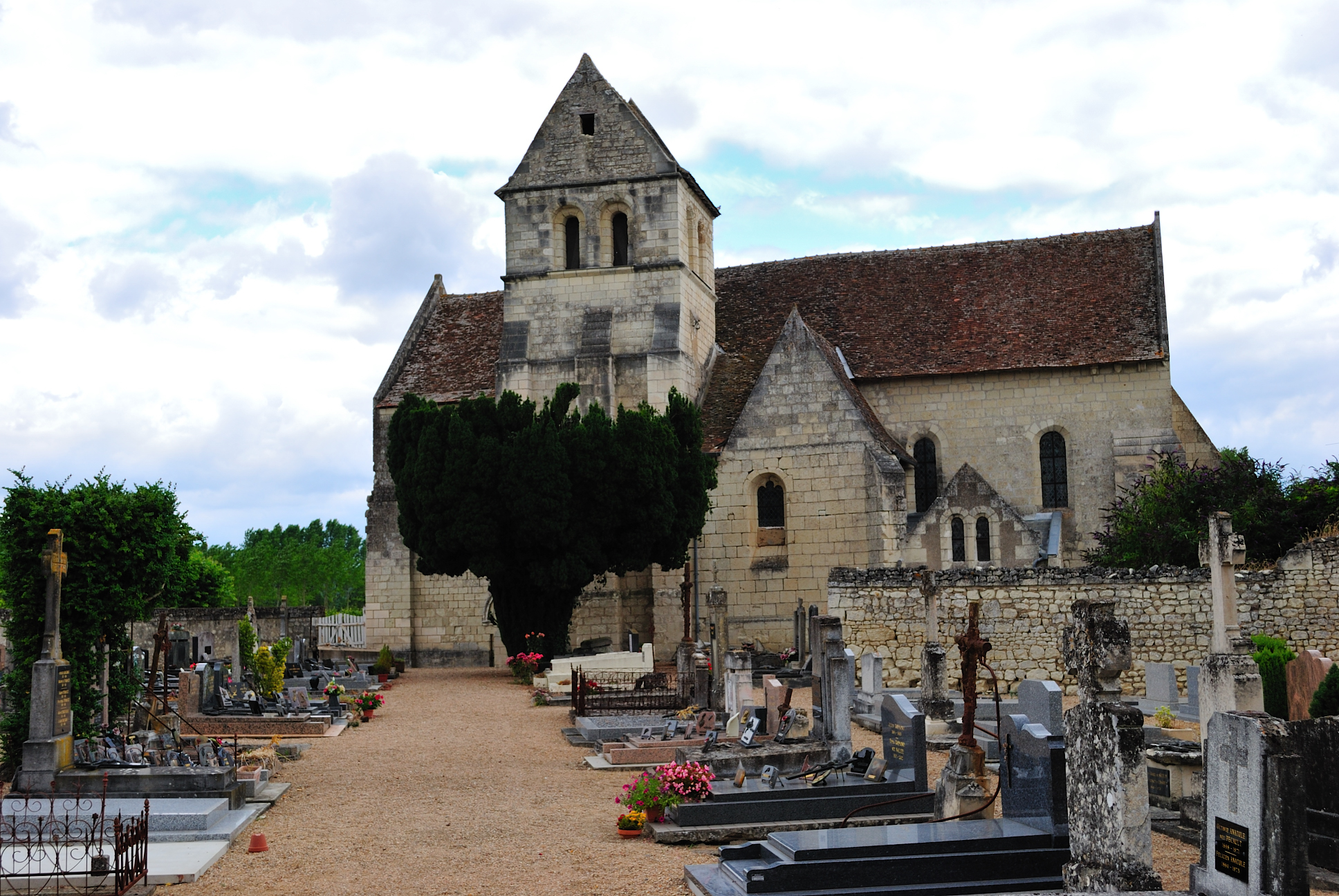
- The church of Saint-Hilaire, in Sazilly
- Location of Sazilly
- Location within France Location within Centre-Val de Loire
- Coordinates: 47°08′12″N 0°20′34″E
- Country: France
- Region: Centre-Val de Loire
- Department: Indre-et-Loire
- Arrondissement: Chinon
- Canton: Sainte-Maure-de-Touraine

Government
  - Mayor (2020–2026): Fabrice Merlot
- Area^{1}: 10.57 km^{2} (4.08 sq mi)
- Highest elevation: 87 m (285 ft)
- Lowest elevation: 27 m (89 ft)
- Population (2023): 273
  - Density: 25.8/km^{2} (66.9/sq mi)
- Time zone: UTC+01:00 (CET)
  - Summer (DST): UTC+02:00 (CEST)
- INSEE/Postal code: 37244 /37220
- ^{1} French Land Register data, which excludes lakes, ponds, glaciers > 1 km^{2} (0.386 sq mi or 247 acres) and river estuaries.

Sazilly (French pronunciation: [saziji]) is a commune in the Indre-et-Loire department in central France.

== Population ==
Historical population
Year	Pop.	±% p.a.
1968	256	—
1975	230	−1.52%
1982	236	+0.37%
1990	234	−0.11%
1999	231	−0.14%
2007	253	+1.14%
2012	255	+0.16%
2017	237	−1.45%
2023	273	+2.38%
Source: INSEE

== See also ==
- Communes of the Indre-et-Loire department
