= Noyant-de-Touraine =

- Commune
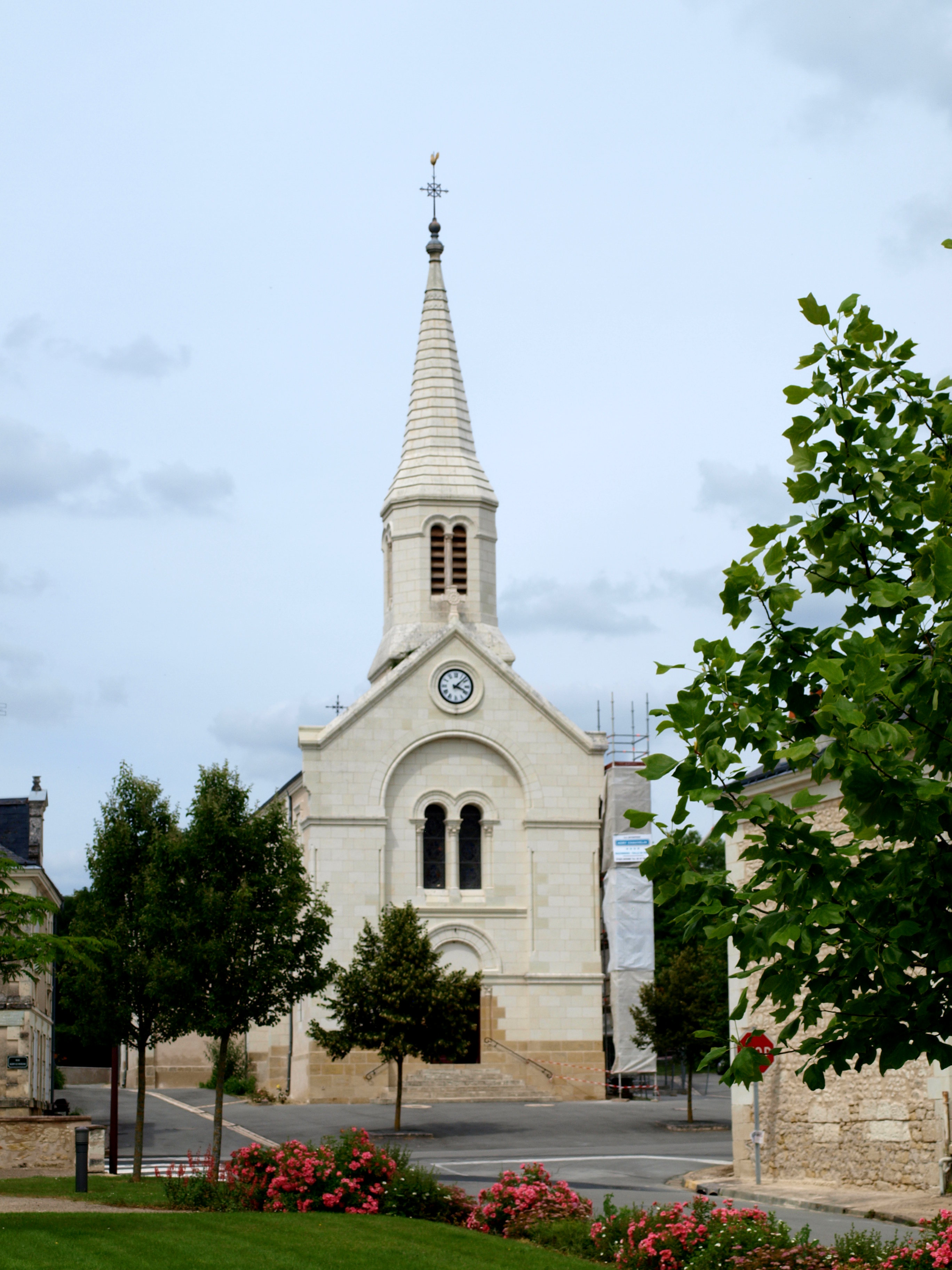
- The church in Noyant-de-Touraine
- Location of Noyant-de-Touraine
- Location within France Location within Centre-Val de Loire
- Coordinates: 47°06′37″N 0°33′36″E
- Country: France
- Region: Centre-Val de Loire
- Department: Indre-et-Loire
- Arrondissement: Chinon
- Canton: Sainte-Maure-de-Touraine

Government
  - Mayor (2020–2026): Théo Champion-Bodin
- Area^{1}: 13.74 km^{2} (5.31 sq mi)
- Highest elevation: 103 m (338 ft)
- Lowest elevation: 51 m (167 ft)
- Population (2023): 1,160
  - Density: 84.4/km^{2} (219/sq mi)
- Time zone: UTC+01:00 (CET)
  - Summer (DST): UTC+02:00 (CEST)
- INSEE/Postal code: 37176 /37800
- ^{1} French Land Register data, which excludes lakes, ponds, glaciers > 1 km^{2} (0.386 sq mi or 247 acres) and river estuaries.

Noyant-de-Touraine (French pronunciation: [nwajɑ̃ də tuʁɛn], literally Noyant of Touraine) is a commune in the Indre-et-Loire department in central France.

== Population ==
Historical population
Year	Pop.	±% p.a.
1968	570	—
1975	541	−0.74%
1982	564	+0.60%
1990	622	+1.23%
1999	646	+0.42%
2007	858	+3.61%
2012	1,079	+4.69%
2017	1,215	+2.40%
2023	1,160	−0.77%
Source: INSEE

== See also ==
- Communes of the Indre-et-Loire department
