= Brizay =

- Commune
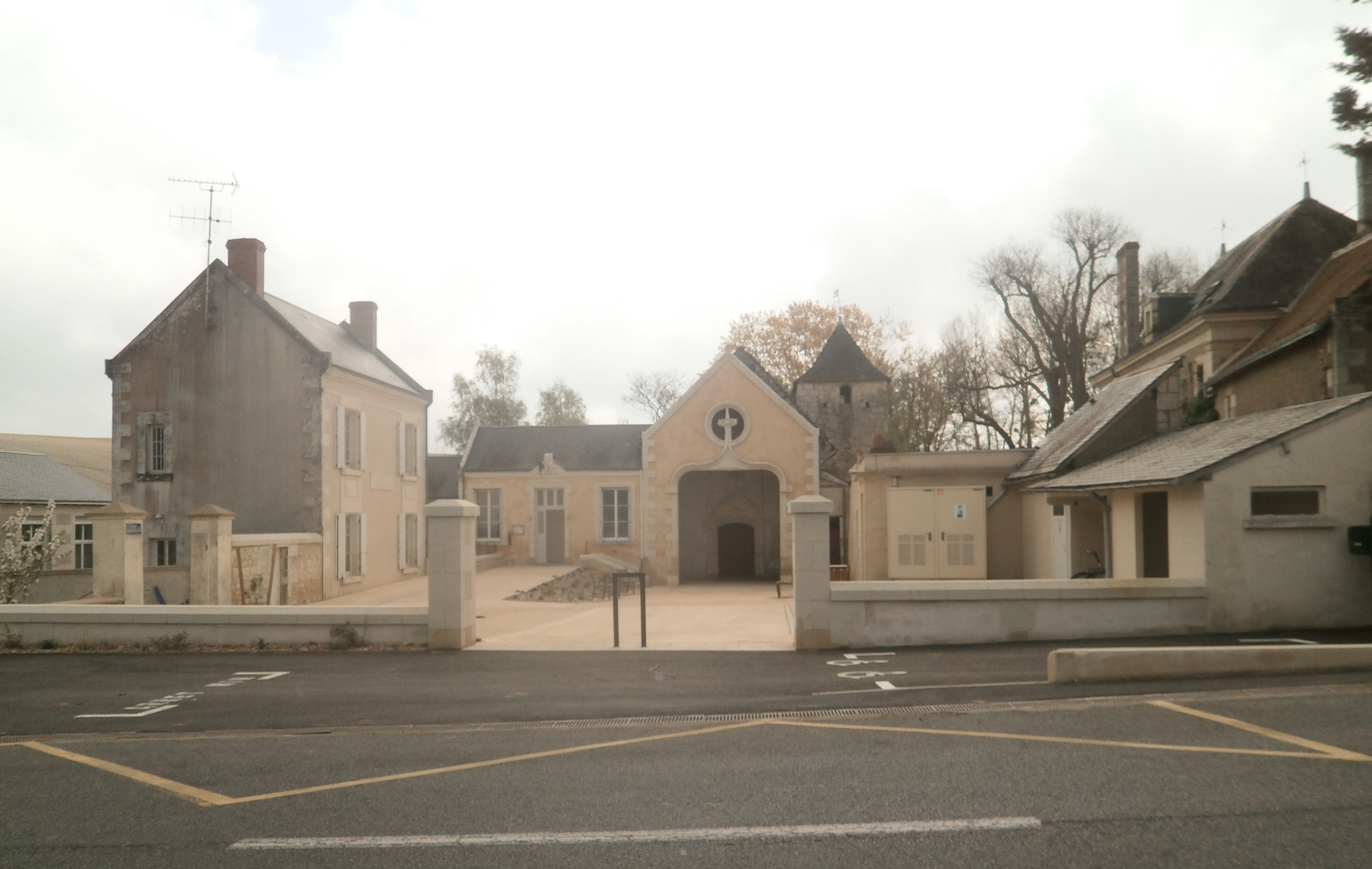
- Mayors office (left) and church (right)
- Location of Brizay
- Location within France Location within Centre-Val de Loire
- Coordinates: 47°06′11″N 0°24′12″E
- Country: France
- Region: Centre-Val de Loire
- Department: Indre-et-Loire
- Arrondissement: Chinon
- Canton: Sainte-Maure-de-Touraine
- Intercommunality: CC Touraine Val de Vienne

Government
  - Mayor (2020–2026): Jean-Claude Redureau
- Area^{1}: 14.27 km^{2} (5.51 sq mi)
- Highest elevation: 116 m (381 ft)
- Lowest elevation: 39 m (128 ft)
- Population (2023): 256
  - Density: 17.9/km^{2} (46.5/sq mi)
- Time zone: UTC+01:00 (CET)
  - Summer (DST): UTC+02:00 (CEST)
- INSEE/Postal code: 37040 /37220
- ^{1} French Land Register data, which excludes lakes, ponds, glaciers > 1 km^{2} (0.386 sq mi or 247 acres) and river estuaries.

Brizay (French pronunciation: [bʁizɛ]) is a commune in the Indre-et-Loire department in central France.

== Administration ==
List of successive mayors
In office		Name	Party	Notes
March 2001	March 2008	Jean-Marie Macquet		
March 2008	March 2014	Patricia Pecault		
March 2014	2020	Jean-Louis Schlosser	Independent	
2020	Present	Jean-Claude Redureau		

== Population ==
Historical population
Year	Pop.	±% p.a.
1968	225	—
1975	190	−2.39%
1982	228	+2.64%
1990	280	+2.60%
1999	287	+0.27%
2007	306	+0.80%
2012	328	+1.40%
2017	280	−3.11%
2023	256	−1.48%
Source: INSEE

== See also ==
- Communes of the Indre-et-Loire department
