= Rilly-sur-Vienne =

- Commune
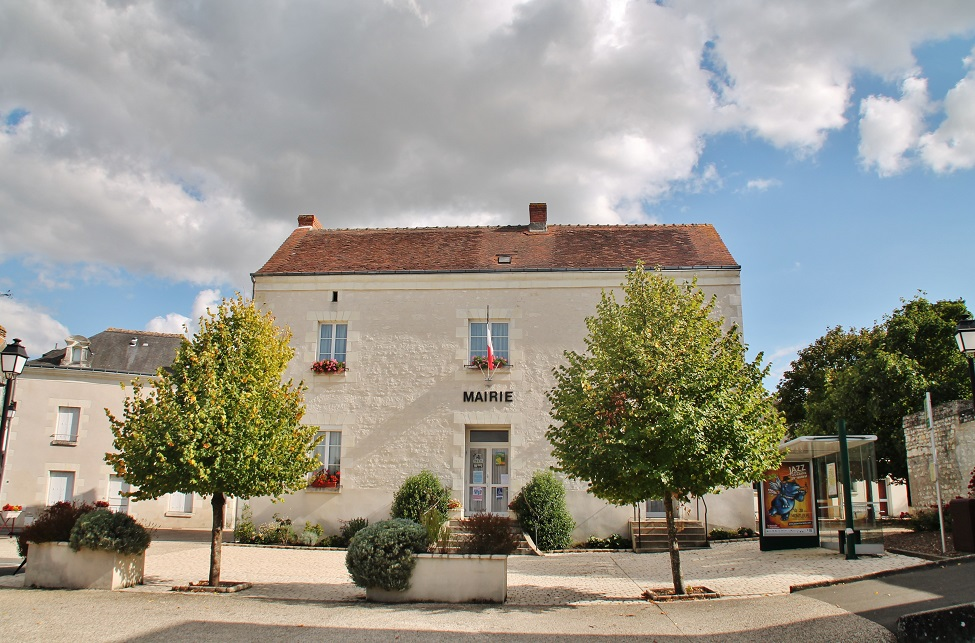
- Town hall
- Location of Rilly-sur-Vienne
- Location within France Location within Centre-Val de Loire
- Coordinates: 47°03′26″N 0°29′34″E
- Country: France
- Region: Centre-Val de Loire
- Department: Indre-et-Loire
- Arrondissement: Chinon
- Canton: Sainte-Maure-de-Touraine

Government
  - Mayor (2020–2026): Laurent Raineau
- Area^{1}: 13.1 km^{2} (5.1 sq mi)
- Highest elevation: 124 m (407 ft)
- Lowest elevation: 38 m (125 ft)
- Population (2023): 458
  - Density: 35.0/km^{2} (90.6/sq mi)
- Time zone: UTC+01:00 (CET)
  - Summer (DST): UTC+02:00 (CEST)
- INSEE/Postal code: 37199 /37220
- ^{1} French Land Register data, which excludes lakes, ponds, glaciers > 1 km^{2} (0.386 sq mi or 247 acres) and river estuaries.

Rilly-sur-Vienne (French pronunciation: [ʁiji syʁ vjɛn], lit. 'Rilly on Vienne') is a commune in the Indre-et-Loire department in central France.

== Population ==
Historical population
Year	Pop.	±% p.a.
1968	483	—
1975	440	−1.32%
1982	392	−1.64%
1990	421	+0.90%
1999	404	−0.46%
2007	454	+1.47%
2012	452	−0.09%
2017	489	+1.59%
2023	458	−1.09%
Source: INSEE

== See also ==
- Communes of the Indre-et-Loire department
