= Villebourg =

- Commune
- Location of Villebourg
- Location within France Location within Centre-Val de Loire
- Coordinates: 47°39′04″N 0°31′47″E
- Country: France
- Region: Centre-Val de Loire
- Department: Indre-et-Loire
- Arrondissement: Chinon
- Canton: Château-Renault

Government
  - Mayor (2020–2026): Christophe Fromont
- Area^{1}: 12.36 km^{2} (4.77 sq mi)
- Highest elevation: 127 m (417 ft)
- Lowest elevation: 57 m (187 ft)
- Population (2023): 303
  - Density: 24.5/km^{2} (63.5/sq mi)
- Time zone: UTC+01:00 (CET)
  - Summer (DST): UTC+02:00 (CEST)
- INSEE/Postal code: 37274 /37370
- ^{1} French Land Register data, which excludes lakes, ponds, glaciers > 1 km^{2} (0.386 sq mi or 247 acres) and river estuaries.

Villebourg (French pronunciation: [vilbuʁ]) is a commune in the Indre-et-Loire department in central France.

== Population ==
Historical population
| Year | Pop. | ±% p.a. |
|---|---|---|
| 1968 | 328 | — |
| 1975 | 299 | −1.31% |
| 1982 | 286 | −0.63% |
| 1990 | 251 | −1.62% |
| 1999 | 259 | +0.35% |
| 2007 | 278 | +0.89% |
| 2012 | 289 | +0.78% |
| 2017 | 298 | +0.62% |
| 2023 | 303 | +0.28% |
Source: INSEE

== See also ==
- Communes of the Indre-et-Loire department
