= Pussigny =

- Commune
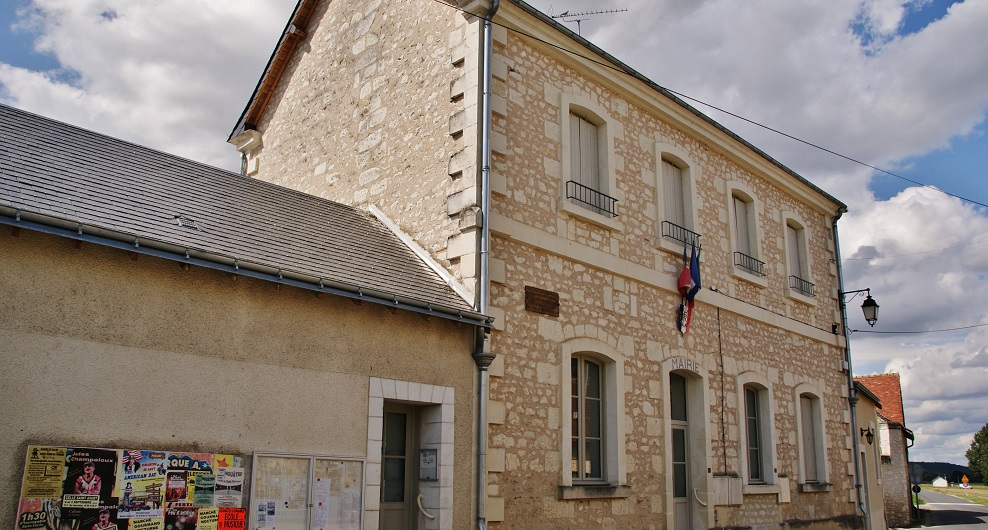
- Town hall

- Coat of arms
- Location of Pussigny
- Location within France Location within Centre-Val de Loire
- Coordinates: 46°59′37″N 0°34′15″E
- Country: France
- Region: Centre-Val de Loire
- Department: Indre-et-Loire
- Arrondissement: Chinon
- Canton: Sainte-Maure-de-Touraine

Government
  - Mayor (2020–2026): Alain Dubois
- Area^{1}: 8.48 km^{2} (3.27 sq mi)
- Highest elevation: 114 m (374 ft)
- Lowest elevation: 37 m (121 ft)
- Population (2023): 159
  - Density: 18.7/km^{2} (48.6/sq mi)
- Time zone: UTC+01:00 (CET)
  - Summer (DST): UTC+02:00 (CEST)
- INSEE/Postal code: 37190 /37800
- ^{1} French Land Register data, which excludes lakes, ponds, glaciers > 1 km^{2} (0.386 sq mi or 247 acres) and river estuaries.

Pussigny (French pronunciation: [pysiɲi]) is a commune in the Indre-et-Loire department in central France.

== Population ==
Historical population
Year	Pop.	±% p.a.
1968	209	—
1975	171	−2.83%
1982	160	−0.95%
1990	162	+0.16%
1999	184	+1.42%
2007	195	+0.73%
2012	183	−1.26%
2017	168	−1.70%
2023	159	−0.91%
Source: INSEE

== See also ==
- Communes of the Indre-et-Loire department
