= Verneuil-le-Château =

- Commune
- Coat of arms
- Location of Verneuil-le-Château
- Location within France Location within Centre-Val de Loire
- Coordinates: 47°02′22″N 0°27′30″E
- Country: France
- Region: Centre-Val de Loire
- Department: Indre-et-Loire
- Arrondissement: Chinon
- Canton: Sainte-Maure-de-Touraine

Government
  - Mayor (2020–2026): Eric Bigot
- Area^{1}: 8.44 km^{2} (3.26 sq mi)
- Highest elevation: 123 m (404 ft)
- Population (2023): 124
  - Density: 14.7/km^{2} (38.1/sq mi)
- Time zone: UTC+01:00 (CET)
  - Summer (DST): UTC+02:00 (CEST)
- INSEE/Postal code: 37268 /37120
- ^{1} French Land Register data, which excludes lakes, ponds, glaciers > 1 km^{2} (0.386 sq mi or 247 acres) and river estuaries.

Verneuil-le-Château (French pronunciation: [vɛʁnœj lə ʃɑto]) is a commune in the Indre-et-Loire department in central France.

== Population ==
Historical population
Year	Pop.	±% p.a.
1968	172	—
1975	145	−2.41%
1982	125	−2.10%
1990	131	+0.59%
1999	110	−1.92%
2007	128	+1.91%
2012	144	+2.38%
2017	126	−2.64%
2023	124	−0.27%
Source: INSEE

== See also ==
- Communes of the Indre-et-Loire department
