= Assay, Indre-et-Loire =

Assay
- Commune
- Location of Assay
- Location within France Location within Centre-Val de Loire
- Coordinates: 47°04′31″N 0°17′27″E
- Country: France
- Region: Centre-Val de Loire
- Department: Indre-et-Loire
- Arrondissement: Chinon
- Canton: Sainte-Maure-de-Touraine
- Intercommunality: CC Touraine Val Vienne

Government
  - Mayor (2020–2026): Claudine Gaucher
- Area^{1}: 14.53 km^{2} (5.61 sq mi)
- Highest elevation: 92 m (302 ft)
- Lowest elevation: 38 m (125 ft)
- Population (2023): 177
  - Density: 12.2/km^{2} (31.6/sq mi)
- Time zone: UTC+01:00 (CET)
  - Summer (DST): UTC+02:00 (CEST)
- INSEE/Postal code: 37007 /37120
- ^{1} French Land Register data, which excludes lakes, ponds, glaciers > 1 km^{2} (0.386 sq mi or 247 acres) and river estuaries.

Assay (French pronunciation: [asɛ]) is a commune in the Indre-et-Loire department in central France.

== Population ==
Historical population
Year	Pop.	±% p.a.
1968	225	—
1975	163	−4.50%
1982	168	+0.43%
1990	173	+0.37%
1999	174	+0.06%
2007	178	+0.28%
2012	160	−2.11%
2017	166	+0.74%
2023	177	+1.08%
Source: INSEE

== See also ==
- Communes of the Indre-et-Loire department
