= Razines =

- Commune
- Location of Razines
- Location within France Location within Centre-Val de Loire
- Coordinates: 46°58′35″N 0°22′43″E
- Country: France
- Region: Centre-Val de Loire
- Department: Indre-et-Loire
- Arrondissement: Chinon
- Canton: Sainte-Maure-de-Touraine

Government
  - Mayor (2020–2026): Franck Libéreau
- Area^{1}: 14.73 km^{2} (5.69 sq mi)
- Highest elevation: 134 m (440 ft)
- Lowest elevation: 56 m (184 ft)
- Population (2023): 218
  - Density: 14.8/km^{2} (38.3/sq mi)
- Time zone: UTC+01:00 (CET)
  - Summer (DST): UTC+02:00 (CEST)
- INSEE/Postal code: 37191 /37120
- ^{1} French Land Register data, which excludes lakes, ponds, glaciers > 1 km^{2} (0.386 sq mi or 247 acres) and river estuaries.

Razines (French pronunciation: [ʁazin]) is a commune in the Indre-et-Loire department in central France.

== Population ==
Historical population
Year	Pop.	±% p.a.
1968	316	—
1975	254	−3.07%
1982	253	−0.06%
1990	262	+0.44%
1999	246	−0.70%
2007	243	−0.15%
2012	243	+0.00%
2017	236	−0.58%
2023	218	−1.31%
Source: INSEE

== See also ==
- Communes of the Indre-et-Loire department
