= Ports-sur-Vienne =

- Commune
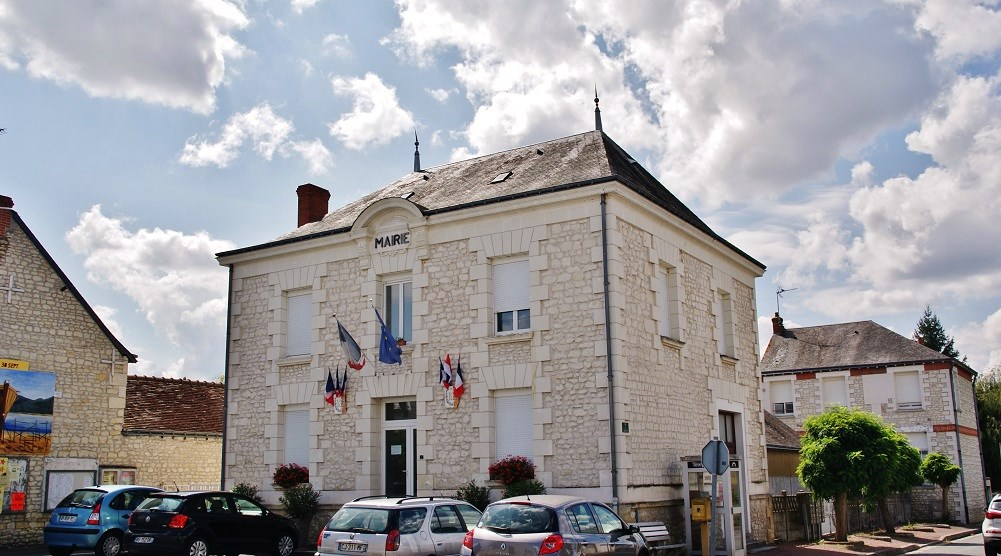
- Town hall
- Location of Ports-sur-Vienne
- Location within France Location within Centre-Val de Loire
- Coordinates: 47°00′58″N 0°33′17″E
- Country: France
- Region: Centre-Val de Loire
- Department: Indre-et-Loire
- Arrondissement: Chinon
- Canton: Sainte-Maure-de-Touraine

Government
  - Mayor (2020–2026): Daniel Poujaud
- Area^{1}: 11.01 km^{2} (4.25 sq mi)
- Highest elevation: 123 m (404 ft)
- Lowest elevation: 32 m (105 ft)
- Population (2023): 352
  - Density: 32.0/km^{2} (82.8/sq mi)
- Time zone: UTC+01:00 (CET)
  - Summer (DST): UTC+02:00 (CEST)
- INSEE/Postal code: 37187 /37800
- ^{1} French Land Register data, which excludes lakes, ponds, glaciers > 1 km^{2} (0.386 sq mi or 247 acres) and river estuaries.

Ports-sur-Vienne (French pronunciation: [pɔʁ syʁ vjɛn], literally Ports on Vienne; previously known as Ports until February 2020) is a commune in the Indre-et-Loire department in central France.

== Population ==
Historical population
Year	Pop.	±% p.a.
1968	437	—
1975	406	−1.05%
1982	345	−2.30%
1990	343	−0.07%
1999	347	+0.13%
2007	355	+0.29%
2012	358	+0.17%
2017	359	+0.06%
2023	352	−0.33%
Source: INSEE

The inhabitants are called Portais or Portaises in French.

== See also ==
- Communes of the Indre-et-Loire department
