= Neuil =

- Commune
- Coat of arms
- Location of Neuil
- Location within France Location within Centre-Val de Loire
- Coordinates: 47°10′19″N 0°30′48″E
- Country: France
- Region: Centre-Val de Loire
- Department: Indre-et-Loire
- Arrondissement: Chinon
- Canton: Sainte-Maure-de-Touraine

Government
  - Mayor (2020–2026): Natalie Sennegon
- Area^{1}: 18.82 km^{2} (7.27 sq mi)
- Highest elevation: 117 m (384 ft)
- Lowest elevation: 60 m (200 ft)
- Population (2023): 413
  - Density: 21.9/km^{2} (56.8/sq mi)
- Time zone: UTC+01:00 (CET)
  - Summer (DST): UTC+02:00 (CEST)
- INSEE/Postal code: 37165 /37190
- ^{1} French Land Register data, which excludes lakes, ponds, glaciers > 1 km^{2} (0.386 sq mi or 247 acres) and river estuaries.

Neuil (French pronunciation: [nœj]) is a commune in the Indre-et-Loire department in central France.

== Population ==
Historical population
Year	Pop.	±% p.a.
1968	393	—
1975	361	−1.21%
1982	331	−1.23%
1990	358	+0.99%
1999	369	+0.34%
2007	426	+1.81%
2012	441	+0.69%
2017	440	−0.05%
2023	413	−1.05%
Source: INSEE

== See also ==
- Communes of the Indre-et-Loire department
