= Chaveignes =

- Commune
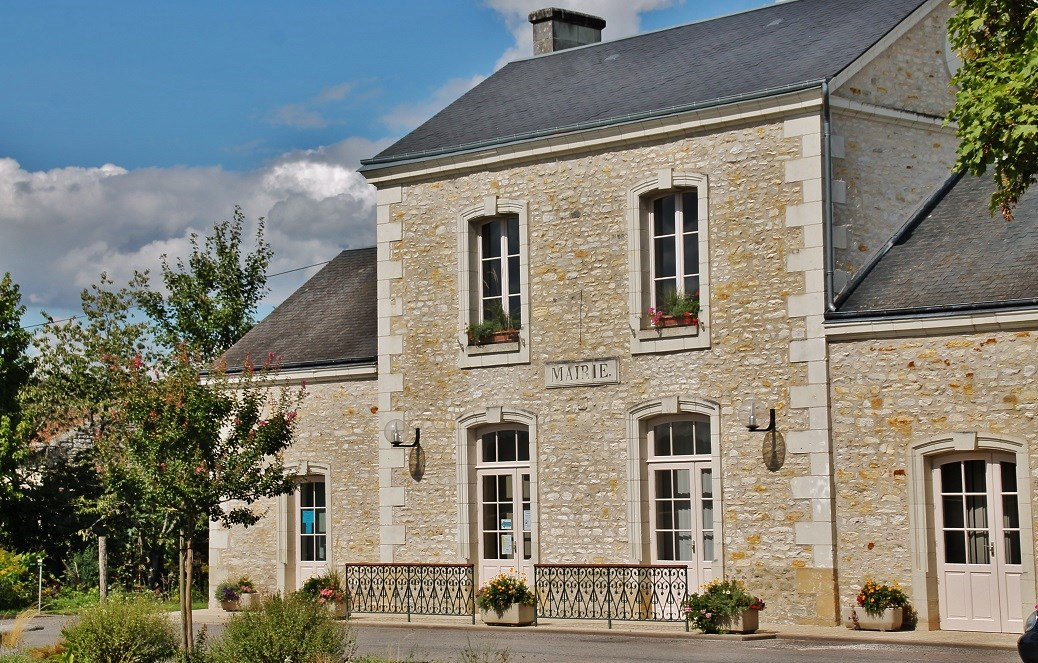
- Town hall
- Location of Chaveignes
- Location within France Location within Centre-Val de Loire
- Coordinates: 47°02′19″N 0°21′02″E
- Country: France
- Region: Centre-Val de Loire
- Department: Indre-et-Loire
- Arrondissement: Chinon
- Canton: Sainte-Maure-de-Touraine

Government
  - Mayor (2020–2026): Philippe Dubois
- Area^{1}: 21.34 km^{2} (8.24 sq mi)
- Highest elevation: 117 m (384 ft)
- Lowest elevation: 45 m (148 ft)
- Population (2023): 581
  - Density: 27.2/km^{2} (70.5/sq mi)
- Time zone: UTC+01:00 (CET)
  - Summer (DST): UTC+02:00 (CEST)
- INSEE/Postal code: 37065 /37120
- ^{1} French Land Register data, which excludes lakes, ponds, glaciers > 1 km^{2} (0.386 sq mi or 247 acres) and river estuaries.

Chaveignes (French pronunciation: [ʃavɛɲ]) is a commune in the Indre-et-Loire department in central France.

== Population ==
Historical population
Year	Pop.	±% p.a.
1968	624	—
1975	554	−1.69%
1982	617	+1.55%
1990	654	+0.73%
1999	595	−1.05%
2007	542	−1.16%
2012	570	+1.01%
2017	552	−0.64%
2023	581	+0.86%
Source: INSEE

== See also ==
- Communes of the Indre-et-Loire department
