= Continvoir =

- Commune
- Coat of arms
- Location of Continvoir
- Location within France Location within Centre-Val de Loire
- Coordinates: 47°23′20″N 0°13′17″E
- Country: France
- Region: Centre-Val de Loire
- Department: Indre-et-Loire
- Arrondissement: Chinon
- Canton: Langeais

Government
  - Mayor (2020–2026): François Grandemange
- Area^{1}: 41.19 km^{2} (15.90 sq mi)
- Highest elevation: 109 m (358 ft)
- Lowest elevation: 47 m (154 ft)
- Population (2023): 469
  - Density: 11.4/km^{2} (29.5/sq mi)
- Time zone: UTC+01:00 (CET)
  - Summer (DST): UTC+02:00 (CEST)
- INSEE/Postal code: 37082 /37340
- ^{1} French Land Register data, which excludes lakes, ponds, glaciers > 1 km^{2} (0.386 sq mi or 247 acres) and river estuaries.

Continvoir (French pronunciation: [kɔ̃tɛ̃vwaʁ]) is a commune in the Indre-et-Loire department in central France.

== Population ==
Historical population
Year	Pop.	±% p.a.
1968	570	—
1975	439	−3.66%
1982	479	+1.25%
1990	420	−1.63%
1999	449	+0.74%
2007	457	+0.22%
2012	465	+0.35%
2017	412	−2.39%
2023	469	+2.18%
Source: INSEE

== See also ==
- Communes of the Indre-et-Loire department
