= Crissay-sur-Manse =

- Commune
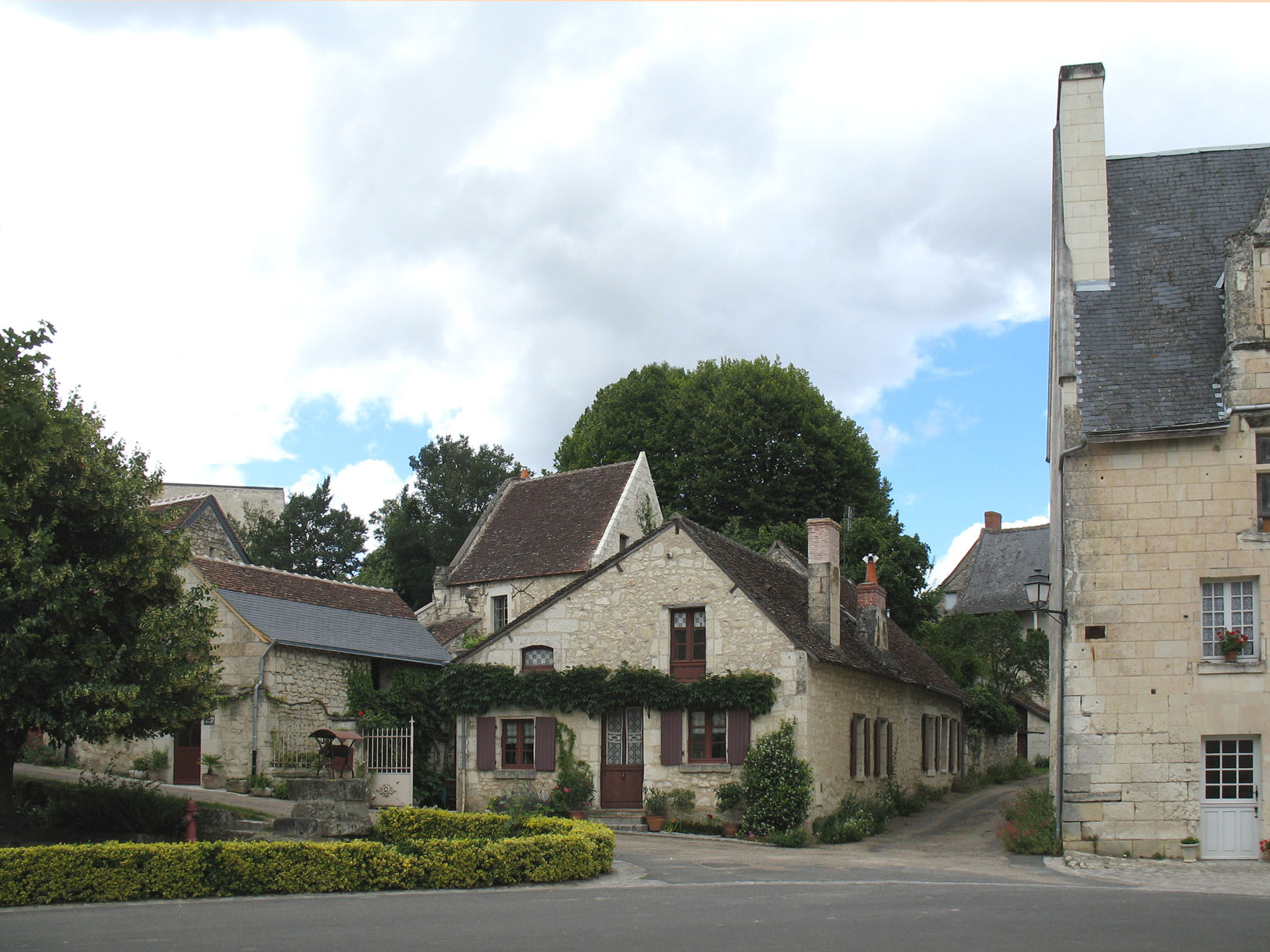
- A view within Crissay-sur-Manse

- Coat of arms
- Location of Crissay-sur-Manse
- Location within France Location within Centre-Val de Loire
- Coordinates: 47°09′03″N 0°29′19″E
- Country: France
- Region: Centre-Val de Loire
- Department: Indre-et-Loire
- Arrondissement: Chinon
- Canton: Sainte-Maure-de-Touraine

Government
  - Mayor (2020–2026): Mark Dernoncour
- Area^{1}: 7.5 km^{2} (2.9 sq mi)
- Highest elevation: 120 m (390 ft)
- Lowest elevation: 44 m (144 ft)
- Population (2023): 107
  - Density: 14/km^{2} (37/sq mi)
- Time zone: UTC+01:00 (CET)
  - Summer (DST): UTC+02:00 (CEST)
- INSEE/Postal code: 37090 /37220
- ^{1} French Land Register data, which excludes lakes, ponds, glaciers > 1 km^{2} (0.386 sq mi or 247 acres) and river estuaries.

Crissay-sur-Manse (French pronunciation: [kʁisɛ syʁ mɑ̃s]) is a commune in the Indre-et-Loire department in central France. It is a member of Les Plus Beaux Villages de France (The Most Beautiful Villages of France) Association. The houses are made from white limestone, with mullioned windows. The village is located on the Manse river.

== Population ==
Historical population
Year	Pop.	±% p.a.
1968	164	—
1975	137	−2.54%
1982	118	−2.11%
1990	97	−2.42%
1999	119	+2.30%
2007	116	−0.32%
2012	114	−0.35%
2017	99	−2.78%
2023	107	+1.30%
Source: INSEE

== Amenities ==
In 2010 it contained two restaurants. There are walking trails and picnic areas signposted in the town.

== History ==
It was fortified in 1545, and was given to Jacques Turpin II of Crissé by the authority of François I.

== See also ==
- Communes of the Indre-et-Loire department
