= Panzoult =

- Commune
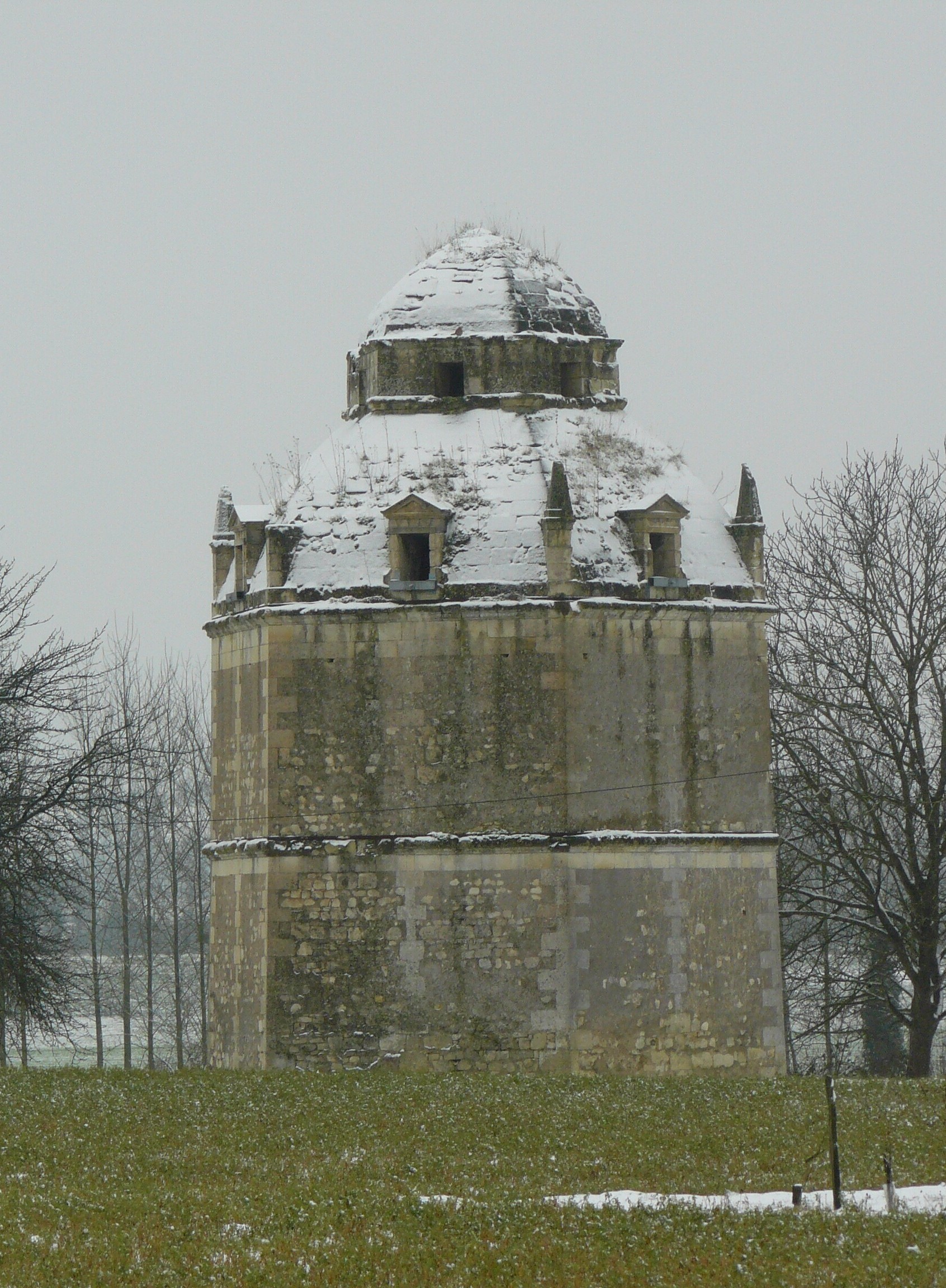
- Dovecote
- Location of Panzoult
- Location within France Location within Centre-Val de Loire
- Coordinates: 47°08′49″N 0°24′07″E
- Country: France
- Region: Centre-Val de Loire
- Department: Indre-et-Loire
- Arrondissement: Chinon
- Canton: Sainte-Maure-de-Touraine

Government
  - Mayor (2020–2026): Francis Desbourdes
- Area^{1}: 34.61 km^{2} (13.36 sq mi)
- Highest elevation: 119 m (390 ft)
- Lowest elevation: 27 m (89 ft)
- Population (2023): 585
  - Density: 16.9/km^{2} (43.8/sq mi)
- Time zone: UTC+01:00 (CET)
  - Summer (DST): UTC+02:00 (CEST)
- INSEE/Postal code: 37178 /37220
- ^{1} French Land Register data, which excludes lakes, ponds, glaciers > 1 km^{2} (0.386 sq mi or 247 acres) and river estuaries.

Panzoult (French pronunciation: [pɑ̃zu]) is a commune in the Indre-et-Loire department in central France.

== Population ==
Historical population
Year	Pop.	±% p.a.
1968	554	—
1975	525	−0.77%
1982	481	−1.24%
1990	551	+1.71%
1999	564	+0.26%
2007	571	+0.15%
2012	549	−0.78%
2017	595	+1.62%
2023	585	−0.28%
Source: INSEE

== See also ==
- Communes of the Indre-et-Loire department
