= Trogues =

- Commune
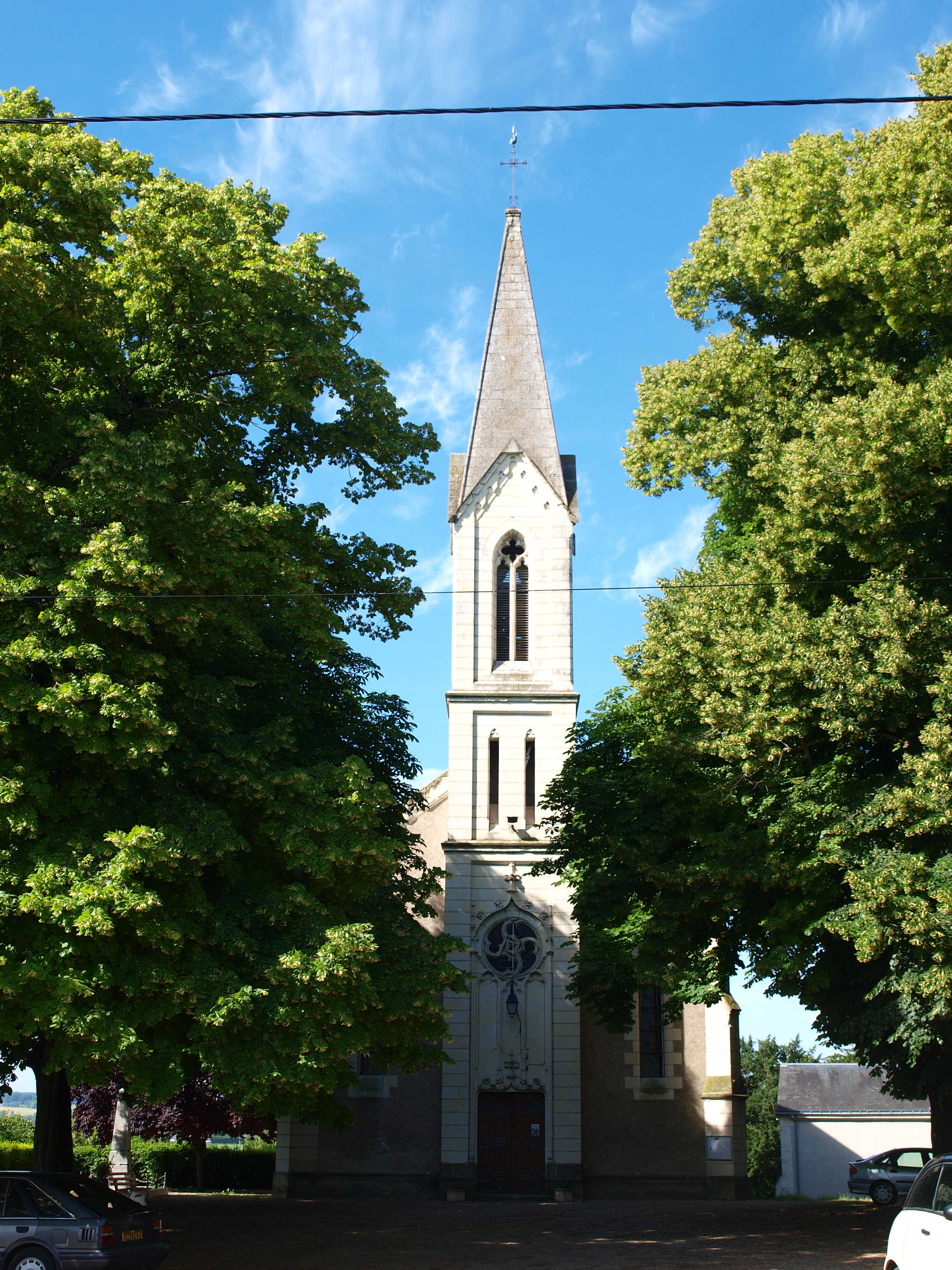
- The church in Trogues

- Coat of arms
- Location of Trogues
- Location within France Location within Centre-Val de Loire
- Coordinates: 47°06′50″N 0°29′45″E
- Country: France
- Region: Centre-Val de Loire
- Department: Indre-et-Loire
- Arrondissement: Chinon
- Canton: Sainte-Maure-de-Touraine

Government
  - Mayor (2020–2026): Christophe Alizon
- Area^{1}: 9.38 km^{2} (3.62 sq mi)
- Highest elevation: 99 m (325 ft)
- Lowest elevation: 32 m (105 ft)
- Population (2023): 285
  - Density: 30.4/km^{2} (78.7/sq mi)
- Time zone: UTC+01:00 (CET)
  - Summer (DST): UTC+02:00 (CEST)
- INSEE/Postal code: 37262 /37220
- ^{1} French Land Register data, which excludes lakes, ponds, glaciers > 1 km^{2} (0.386 sq mi or 247 acres) and river estuaries.

Trogues (French pronunciation: [tʁɔɡ]) is a commune in the Indre-et-Loire department in central France.

== Population ==
Historical population
Year	Pop.	±% p.a.
1968	329	—
1975	292	−1.69%
1982	293	+0.05%
1990	292	−0.04%
1999	290	−0.08%
2007	325	+1.43%
2012	331	+0.37%
2017	310	−1.30%
2023	285	−1.39%
Source: INSEE

== See also ==
- Communes of the Indre-et-Loire department
