= Ambillou =

- Commune
- Location of Ambillou
- Location within France Location within Centre-Val de Loire
- Coordinates: 47°27′07″N 0°26′54″E
- Country: France
- Region: Centre-Val de Loire
- Department: Indre-et-Loire
- Arrondissement: Chinon
- Canton: Langeais
- Intercommunality: Touraine Ouest Val de Loire

Government
  - Mayor (2020–2026): Bruno Cheuvreux
- Area^{1}: 48.85 km^{2} (18.86 sq mi)
- Highest elevation: 117 m (384 ft)
- Lowest elevation: 68 m (223 ft)
- Population (2023): 1,746
  - Density: 35.74/km^{2} (92.57/sq mi)
- Time zone: UTC+01:00 (CET)
  - Summer (DST): UTC+02:00 (CEST)
- INSEE/Postal code: 37002 /37340
- ^{1} French Land Register data, which excludes lakes, ponds, glaciers > 1 km^{2} (0.386 sq mi or 247 acres) and river estuaries.

Ambillou (French pronunciation: [ɑ̃biju]) is a commune in the Indre-et-Loire department in central France.

== Population ==
Historical population
Year	Pop.	±% p.a.
1968	732	—
1975	884	+2.73%
1982	986	+1.57%
1990	1,086	+1.21%
1999	1,301	+2.03%
2007	1,606	+2.67%
2012	1,822	+2.56%
2017	1,786	−0.40%
2023	1,746	−0.38%
Source: INSEE

== See also ==
- Communes of the Indre-et-Loire department
