= Theneuil =

- Commune
- Location of Theneuil
- Location within France Location within Centre-Val de Loire
- Coordinates: 47°05′53″N 0°26′23″E
- Country: France
- Region: Centre-Val de Loire
- Department: Indre-et-Loire
- Arrondissement: Chinon
- Canton: Sainte-Maure-de-Touraine

Government
  - Mayor (2023–2026): Sylvère Moron
- Area^{1}: 0.98 km^{2} (0.38 sq mi)
- Highest elevation: 107 m (351 ft)
- Lowest elevation: 34 m (112 ft)
- Population (2023): 294
  - Density: 300/km^{2} (780/sq mi)
- Time zone: UTC+01:00 (CET)
  - Summer (DST): UTC+02:00 (CEST)
- INSEE/Postal code: 37256 /37220
- ^{1} French Land Register data, which excludes lakes, ponds, glaciers > 1 km^{2} (0.386 sq mi or 247 acres) and river estuaries.

Theneuil (French pronunciation: [tənœj]) is a commune in the Indre-et-Loire department in central France.

== Population ==
Historical population
Year	Pop.	±% p.a.
1968	225	—
1975	192	−2.24%
1982	241	+3.30%
1990	285	+2.12%
1999	294	+0.35%
2007	252	−1.91%
2012	320	+4.89%
2017	298	−1.41%
2023	294	−0.22%
Source: INSEE

== See also ==
- Communes of the Indre-et-Loire department
