= Antogny-le-Tillac =

Antogny le Tillac
- Commune
- Location of Antogny le Tillac
- Location within France Location within Centre-Val de Loire
- Coordinates: 46°58′43″N 0°34′44″E
- Country: France
- Region: Centre-Val de Loire
- Department: Indre-et-Loire
- Arrondissement: Chinon
- Canton: Sainte-Maure-de-Touraine

Government
  - Mayor (2020–2026): Serge Moreau
- Area^{1}: 17.31 km^{2} (6.68 sq mi)
- Highest elevation: 123 m (404 ft)
- Lowest elevation: 37 m (121 ft)
- Population (2023): 485
  - Density: 28.0/km^{2} (72.6/sq mi)
- Time zone: UTC+01:00 (CET)
  - Summer (DST): UTC+02:00 (CEST)
- INSEE/Postal code: 37005 /37800
- ^{1} French Land Register data, which excludes lakes, ponds, glaciers > 1 km^{2} (0.386 sq mi or 247 acres) and river estuaries.

Antogny-le-Tillac (French pronunciation: [ɑ̃tɔɲi lə tijak], before 1987: Antogny) is a commune in the Indre-et-Loire department in central France.

== Population ==
Historical population
Year	Pop.	±% p.a.
1968	479	—
1975	441	−1.17%
1982	497	+1.72%
1990	486	−0.28%
1999	447	−0.93%
2007	530	+2.15%
2012	515	−0.57%
2017	510	−0.19%
2023	485	−0.83%
Source: INSEE

== See also ==
- Communes of the Indre-et-Loire department
