= Avon-les-Roches =

- Commune
- Location of Avon-les-Roches
- Location within France Location within Centre-Val de Loire
- Coordinates: 47°09′27″N 0°26′58″E
- Country: France
- Region: Centre-Val de Loire
- Department: Indre-et-Loire
- Arrondissement: Chinon
- Canton: Sainte-Maure-de-Touraine
- Intercommunality: CC Touraine Val Vienne

Government
  - Mayor (2020–2026): Pascal Blanchard
- Area^{1}: 33.28 km^{2} (12.85 sq mi)
- Highest elevation: 119 m (390 ft)
- Lowest elevation: 38 m (125 ft)
- Population (2023): 534
  - Density: 16.0/km^{2} (41.6/sq mi)
- Time zone: UTC+01:00 (CET)
  - Summer (DST): UTC+02:00 (CEST)
- INSEE/Postal code: 37012 /37220
- ^{1} French Land Register data, which excludes lakes, ponds, glaciers > 1 km^{2} (0.386 sq mi or 247 acres) and river estuaries.

Avon-les-Roches (French pronunciation: [avɔ̃ le ʁɔʃ]) is a commune in the Indre-et-Loire department in central France.

== Population ==
Historical population
Year	Pop.	±% p.a.
1968	648	—
1975	656	+0.18%
1982	579	−1.77%
1990	560	−0.42%
1999	520	−0.82%
2007	523	+0.07%
2012	562	+1.45%
2017	548	−0.50%
2023	534	−0.43%
Source: INSEE

== See also ==
- Communes of the Indre-et-Loire department
