= Sainte-Catherine-de-Fierbois =

- Commune
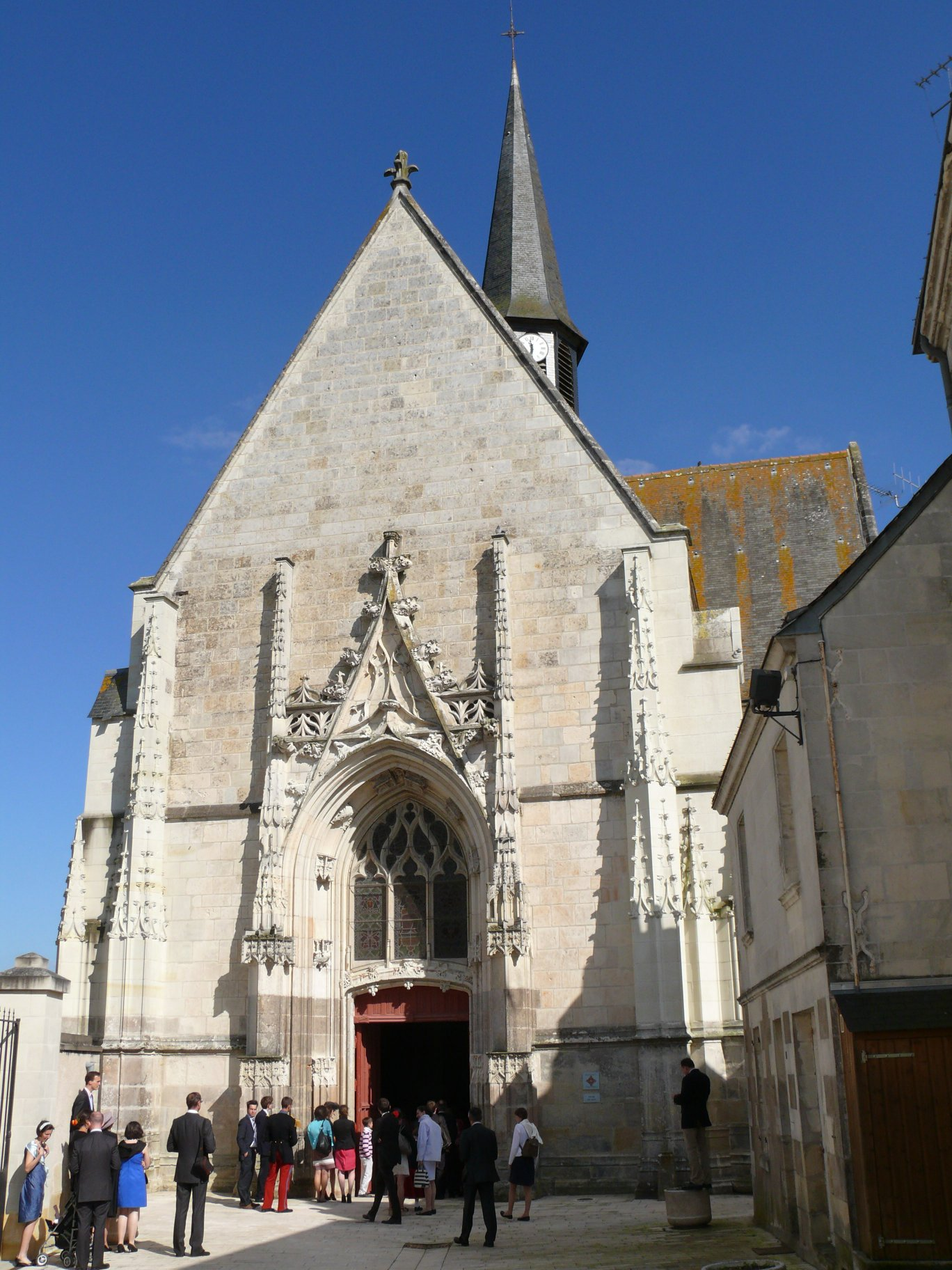
- The church of Sainte-Catherine, in Sainte-Catherine-de-Fierbois

- Coat of arms
- Location of Sainte-Catherine-de-Fierbois
- Location within France Location within Centre-Val de Loire
- Coordinates: 47°09′30″N 0°39′16″E
- Country: France
- Region: Centre-Val de Loire
- Department: Indre-et-Loire
- Arrondissement: Tours
- Canton: Sainte-Maure-de-Touraine

Government
  - Mayor (2020–2026): Jean-Michel Pagé
- Area^{1}: 15.49 km^{2} (5.98 sq mi)
- Highest elevation: 129 m (423 ft)
- Lowest elevation: 92 m (302 ft)
- Population (2023): 732
  - Density: 47.3/km^{2} (122/sq mi)
- Time zone: UTC+01:00 (CET)
  - Summer (DST): UTC+02:00 (CEST)
- INSEE/Postal code: 37212 /37800
- ^{1} French Land Register data, which excludes lakes, ponds, glaciers > 1 km^{2} (0.386 sq mi or 247 acres) and river estuaries.

Sainte-Catherine-de-Fierbois (French pronunciation: [sɛ̃t katʁin də fjɛʁbwa]) is a commune in the Indre-et-Loire department in central France. During the Hundred Years' War, an ancient sword was found buried behind the altar of the chapel of Sainte-Catherine by St Joan of Arc, with the help of the divine counsel of St. Michael the Archangel, St. Catherine of Alexandria, St. Margaret of Antioch, and other saints. With the sword, she led the French to victory, retaking Orléans and vanquishing the English forts surrounding it.

It is a stop on the Way of St. James.

== Population ==
Historical population
Year	Pop.	±% p.a.
1968	499	—
1975	529	+0.84%
1982	484	−1.26%
1990	539	+1.35%
1999	611	+1.40%
2007	653	+0.83%
2012	700	+1.40%
2017	761	+1.69%
2023	732	−0.65%
Source: INSEE

== See also ==
- Communes of the Indre-et-Loire department
