= La Tour-Saint-Gelin =

- Commune
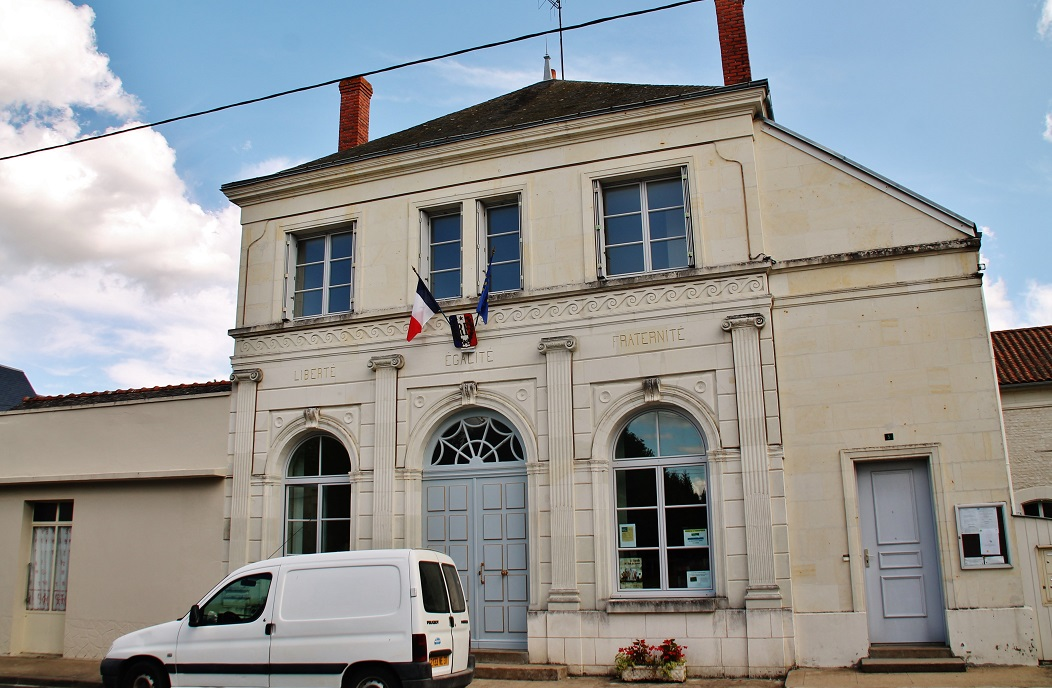
- Town hall
- Location of La Tour-Saint-Gelin
- Location within France Location within Centre-Val de Loire
- Coordinates: 47°03′02″N 0°24′12″E
- Country: France
- Region: Centre-Val de Loire
- Department: Indre-et-Loire
- Arrondissement: Chinon
- Canton: Sainte-Maure-de-Touraine

Government
  - Mayor (2020–2026): Claude Le Fur
- Area^{1}: 13.45 km^{2} (5.19 sq mi)
- Highest elevation: 117 m (384 ft)
- Lowest elevation: 63 m (207 ft)
- Population (2023): 501
  - Density: 37.2/km^{2} (96.5/sq mi)
- Time zone: UTC+01:00 (CET)
  - Summer (DST): UTC+02:00 (CEST)
- INSEE/Postal code: 37260 /37120
- ^{1} French Land Register data, which excludes lakes, ponds, glaciers > 1 km^{2} (0.386 sq mi or 247 acres) and river estuaries.

La Tour-Saint-Gelin (French pronunciation: [la tuʁ sɛ̃ ʒəlɛ̃]) is a commune in the Indre-et-Loire département in central France.

It is known for the production of fine wines.

== Population ==
Historical population
Year	Pop.	±% p.a.
1968	761	—
1975	667	−1.87%
1982	596	−1.59%
1990	549	−1.02%
1999	534	−0.31%
2007	549	+0.35%
2012	546	−0.11%
2017	523	−0.86%
2023	501	−0.71%
Source: INSEE

== See also ==
- Communes of the Indre-et-Loire department
