= Tavant =

- Commune
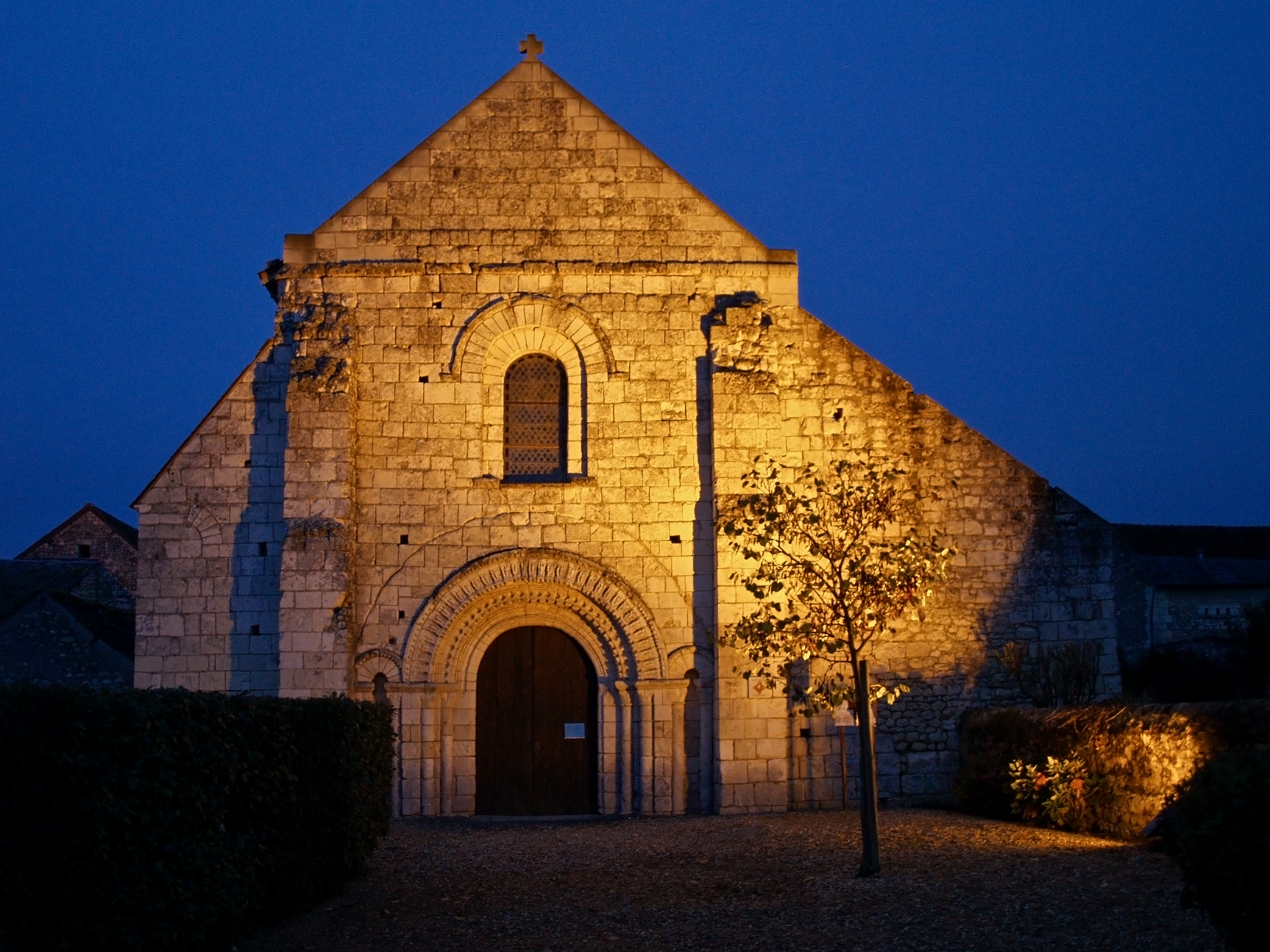
- The romanesque church of Saint Nicholas, in Tavant

- Coat of arms
- Location of Tavant
- Location within France Location within Centre-Val de Loire
- Coordinates: 47°07′36″N 0°23′20″E
- Country: France
- Region: Centre-Val de Loire
- Department: Indre-et-Loire
- Arrondissement: Chinon
- Canton: Sainte-Maure-de-Touraine

Government
  - Mayor (2020–2026): Jacky Cornillault
- Area^{1}: 5.22 km^{2} (2.02 sq mi)
- Highest elevation: 82 m (269 ft)
- Lowest elevation: 28 m (92 ft)
- Population (2023): 267
  - Density: 51.1/km^{2} (132/sq mi)
- Time zone: UTC+01:00 (CET)
  - Summer (DST): UTC+02:00 (CEST)
- INSEE/Postal code: 37255 /37220
- ^{1} French Land Register data, which excludes lakes, ponds, glaciers > 1 km^{2} (0.386 sq mi or 247 acres) and river estuaries.

Tavant (French pronunciation: [tavɑ̃]) is a commune in the Indre-et-Loire department in central France.

== Population ==
Historical population
| Year | Pop. | ±% p.a. |
|---|---|---|
| 1968 | 202 | — |
| 1975 | 189 | −0.95% |
| 1982 | 218 | +2.06% |
| 1990 | 227 | +0.51% |
| 1999 | 238 | +0.53% |
| 2007 | 244 | +0.31% |
| 2012 | 259 | +1.20% |
| 2017 | 263 | +0.31% |
| 2023 | 267 | +0.25% |
Source: INSEE

The inhabitants are called Tavantais in French.

== See also ==
- Communes of the Indre-et-Loire department
