= Parçay-sur-Vienne =

- Commune
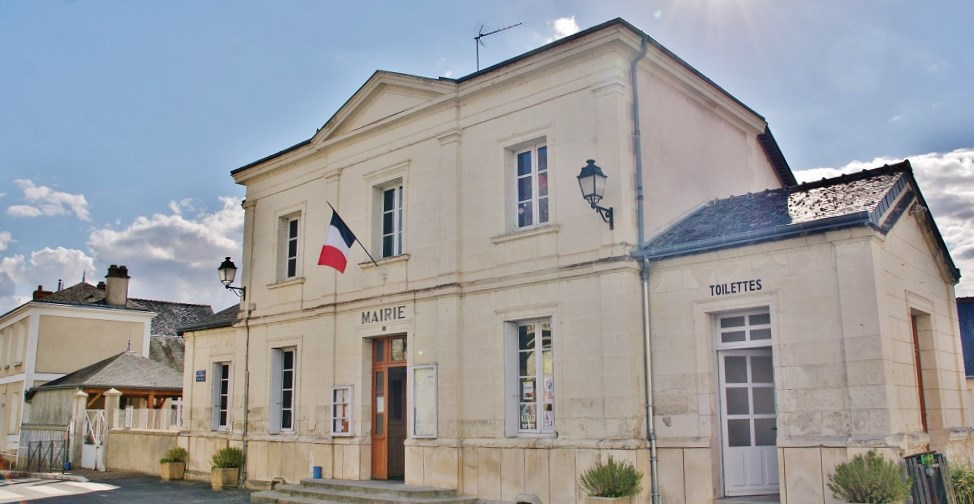
- Town hall
- Location of Parçay-sur-Vienne
- Location within France Location within Centre-Val de Loire
- Coordinates: 47°06′23″N 0°28′39″E
- Country: France
- Region: Centre-Val de Loire
- Department: Indre-et-Loire
- Arrondissement: Chinon
- Canton: Sainte-Maure-de-Touraine

Government
  - Mayor (2020–2026): Olivier Durand
- Area^{1}: 18.74 km^{2} (7.24 sq mi)
- Highest elevation: 115 m (377 ft)
- Lowest elevation: 32 m (105 ft)
- Population (2023): 616
  - Density: 32.9/km^{2} (85.1/sq mi)
- Time zone: UTC+01:00 (CET)
  - Summer (DST): UTC+02:00 (CEST)
- INSEE/Postal code: 37180 /37220
- ^{1} French Land Register data, which excludes lakes, ponds, glaciers > 1 km^{2} (0.386 sq mi or 247 acres) and river estuaries.

Parçay-sur-Vienne (French pronunciation: [paʁsɛ syʁ vjɛn], literally Parçay on Vienne) is a commune in the Indre-et-Loire department in central France.

== Population ==
Historical population
Year	Pop.	±% p.a.
1968	590	—
1975	552	−0.95%
1982	516	−0.96%
1990	515	−0.02%
1999	530	+0.32%
2007	629	+2.16%
2012	647	+0.57%
2017	644	−0.09%
2023	616	−0.74%
Source: INSEE

== See also ==
- Communes of the Indre-et-Loire department
