= Marigny-Marmande =

- Commune
- Location of Marigny-Marmande
- Location within France Location within Centre-Val de Loire
- Coordinates: 46°58′54″N 0°29′24″E
- Country: France
- Region: Centre-Val de Loire
- Department: Indre-et-Loire
- Arrondissement: Chinon
- Canton: Sainte-Maure-de-Touraine

Government
  - Mayor (2020–2026): Claudy Fouquet
- Area^{1}: 30.83 km^{2} (11.90 sq mi)
- Highest elevation: 134 m (440 ft)
- Lowest elevation: 54 m (177 ft)
- Population (2023): 601
  - Density: 19.5/km^{2} (50.5/sq mi)
- Time zone: UTC+01:00 (CET)
  - Summer (DST): UTC+02:00 (CEST)
- INSEE/Postal code: 37148 /37120
- ^{1} French Land Register data, which excludes lakes, ponds, glaciers > 1 km^{2} (0.386 sq mi or 247 acres) and river estuaries.

Marigny-Marmande (French pronunciation: [maʁiɲi maʁmɑ̃d]) is a commune in the Indre-et-Loire department in central France.

== Population ==
Historical population
Year	Pop.	±% p.a.
1968	853	—
1975	760	−1.64%
1982	651	−2.19%
1990	600	−1.01%
1999	625	+0.45%
2007	617	−0.16%
2012	586	−1.03%
2017	595	+0.31%
2023	601	+0.17%
Source: INSEE

== See also ==
- Communes of the Indre-et-Loire department
