= Marcilly-sur-Vienne =

- Commune
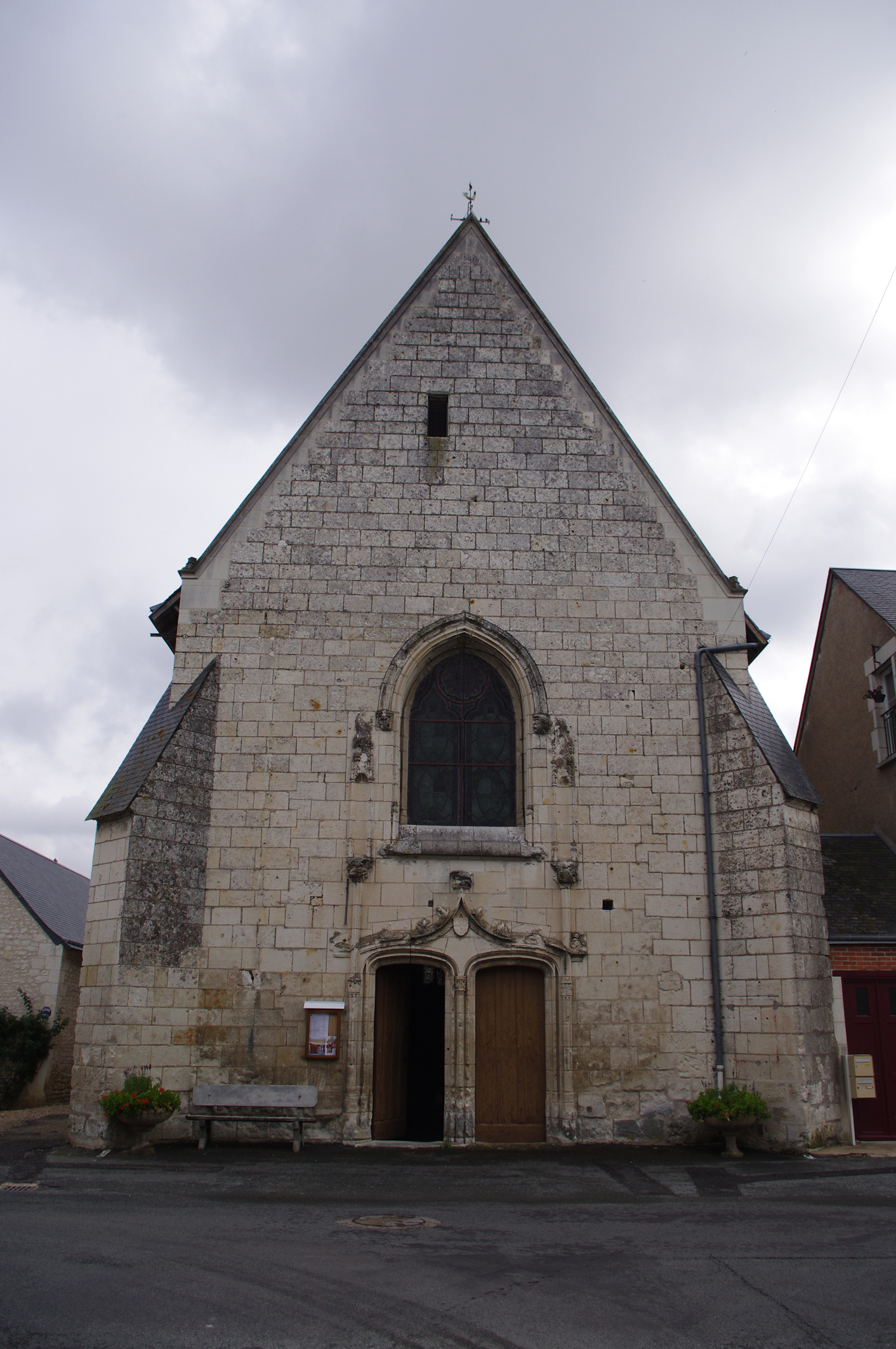
- The church of Saint-Blaise, in Marcilly-sur-Vienne
- Location of Marcilly-sur-Vienne
- Location within France Location within Centre-Val de Loire
- Coordinates: 47°02′42″N 0°32′27″E
- Country: France
- Region: Centre-Val de Loire
- Department: Indre-et-Loire
- Arrondissement: Chinon
- Canton: Sainte-Maure-de-Touraine

Government
  - Mayor (2020–2026): Thierry Brunet
- Area^{1}: 10.99 km^{2} (4.24 sq mi)
- Highest elevation: 121 m (397 ft)
- Lowest elevation: 32 m (105 ft)
- Population (2023): 550
  - Density: 50/km^{2} (130/sq mi)
- Time zone: UTC+01:00 (CET)
  - Summer (DST): UTC+02:00 (CEST)
- INSEE/Postal code: 37147 /37800
- ^{1} French Land Register data, which excludes lakes, ponds, glaciers > 1 km^{2} (0.386 sq mi or 247 acres) and river estuaries.

Marcilly-sur-Vienne (French pronunciation: [maʁsiji syʁ vjɛn], literally Marcilly on Vienne) is a commune in the Indre-et-Loire department in central France.

== Population ==
Historical population
Year	Pop.	±% p.a.
1968	544	—
1975	446	−2.80%
1982	515	+2.08%
1990	526	+0.26%
1999	509	−0.36%
2007	550	+0.97%
2012	548	−0.07%
2017	554	+0.22%
2023	550	−0.12%
Source: INSEE

== See also ==
- Communes of the Indre-et-Loire department
