= Lublé =

- Commune
- Coat of arms
- Location of Lublé
- Location within France Location within Centre-Val de Loire
- Coordinates: 47°30′56″N 0°14′46″E
- Country: France
- Region: Centre-Val de Loire
- Department: Indre-et-Loire
- Arrondissement: Chinon
- Canton: Langeais

Government
  - Mayor (2020–2026): Daniel Meunier
- Area^{1}: 12.6 km^{2} (4.9 sq mi)
- Highest elevation: 118 m (387 ft)
- Lowest elevation: 57 m (187 ft)
- Population (2023): 141
  - Density: 11.2/km^{2} (29.0/sq mi)
- Time zone: UTC+01:00 (CET)
  - Summer (DST): UTC+02:00 (CEST)
- INSEE/Postal code: 37137 /37330
- ^{1} French Land Register data, which excludes lakes, ponds, glaciers > 1 km^{2} (0.386 sq mi or 247 acres) and river estuaries.

Lublé (French pronunciation: [lyble]) is a commune in the Indre-et-Loire department in central France.

== Population ==
Historical population
Year	Pop.	±% p.a.
1968	204	—
1975	204	+0.00%
1982	163	−3.15%
1990	124	−3.36%
1999	125	+0.09%
2007	134	+0.87%
2012	142	+1.17%
2017	144	+0.28%
2023	141	−0.35%
Source: INSEE

== See also ==
- Communes of the Indre-et-Loire department
