= Communes of the Indre-et-Loire department =

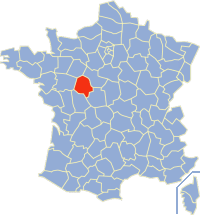

The following is a list of the 272 communes of the Indre-et-Loire department of France.

The communes cooperate in the following intercommunalities (as of 2025):

- Tours Métropole Val de Loire
- Communauté de communes Autour de Chenonceaux Bléré-Val de Cher
- Communauté de communes du Castelrenaudais
- Communauté de communes Chinon, Vienne et Loire
- Communauté de communes de Gâtine-Racan
- Communauté de communes Loches Sud Touraine
- Communauté de communes Touraine-Est Vallées
- Communauté de communes Touraine Ouest Val de Loire
- Communauté de communes Touraine Val de Vienne
- Communauté de communes Touraine Vallée de l'Indre
- Communauté de communes du Val d'Amboise

INSEE	Postal	Commune
37001	37160	Abilly
37002	37340	Ambillou
37003	37400	Amboise
37004	37500	Anché
37005	37800	Antogny-le-Tillac
37006	37260	Artannes-sur-Indre
37007	37120	Assay
37008	37270	Athée-sur-Cher
37009	37110	Autrèche
37010	37110	Auzouer-en-Touraine
37011	37420	Avoine
37012	37220	Avon-les-Roches
37013	37340	Avrillé-les-Ponceaux
37014	37190	Azay-le-Rideau
37015	37270	Azay-sur-Cher
37016	37310	Azay-sur-Indre
37018	37510	Ballan-Miré
37019	37350	Barrou
37020	37600	Beaulieu-lès-Loches
37022	37420	Beaumont-en-Véron
37021	37360	Beaumont-Louestault
37023	37460	Beaumont-Village
37024	37140	Benais
37025	37510	Berthenay
37026	37600	Betz-le-Château
37027	37150	Bléré
37028	37290	Bossay-sur-Claise
37029	37240	Bossée
37030	37110	Le Boulay
37031	37140	Bourgueil
37032	37240	Bournan
37033	37290	Boussay
37034	37120	Braslou
37035	37120	Braye-sous-Faye
37036	37330	Braye-sur-Maulne
37037	37330	Brèches
37038	37130	Bréhémont
37039	37600	Bridoré
37040	37220	Brizay
37041	37370	Bueil-en-Touraine
37042	37500	Candes-Saint-Martin
37043	37530	Cangey
37044	37350	La Celle-Guenand
37045	37160	La Celle-Saint-Avant
37046	37460	Céré-la-Ronde
37047	37390	Cerelles
37048	37290	Chambon
37049	37310	Chambourg-sur-Indre
37050	37170	Chambray-lès-Tours
37051	37120	Champigny-sur-Veude
37052	37210	Chançay
37053	37600	Chanceaux-près-Loches
37054	37390	Chanceaux-sur-Choisille
37055	37330	Channay-sur-Lathan
37056	37130	La Chapelle-aux-Naux
37057	37240	La Chapelle-Blanche-Saint-Martin
37058	37140	La Chapelle-sur-Loire
37059	37390	Charentilly
37060	37530	Chargé
37061	37290	Charnizay
37062	37330	Château-la-Vallière
37063	37110	Château-Renault
37064	37350	Chaumussay
37065	37120	Chaveignes
37066	37310	Chédigny
37067	37190	Cheillé
37068	37370	Chemillé-sur-Dême
37069	37460	Chemillé-sur-Indrois
37070	37150	Chenonceaux
37071	37220	Chezelles
37072	37500	Chinon
37073	37150	Chisseaux
37074	37140	Chouzé-sur-Loire
37075	37310	Cigogné
37076	37500	Cinais
37077	37130	Cinq-Mars-la-Pile
37078	37240	Ciran
37079	37150	Civray-de-Touraine
37080	37160	Civray-sur-Esves
37081	37340	Cléré-les-Pins
37082	37340	Continvoir
37083	37320	Cormery
37232	37130	Coteaux-sur-Loire
37084	37330	Couesmes
37085	37310	Courçay
37086	37330	Courcelles-de-Touraine
37087	37120	Courcoué
37088	37500	Couziers
37089	37500	Cravant-les-Côteaux
37090	37220	Crissay-sur-Manse
37091	37150	La Croix-en-Touraine
37092	37380	Crotelles
37093	37220	Crouzilles
37094	37240	Cussay
37095	37110	Dame-Marie-les-Bois
37115	37160	Descartes
37096	37150	Dierre
37097	37310	Dolus-le-Sec
37098	37800	Draché
37099	37190	Druye
37100	37150	Épeigné-les-Bois
37101	37370	Épeigné-sur-Dême
37103	37240	Esves-le-Moutier
37104	37320	Esvres
37105	37120	Faye-la-Vineuse
37106	37110	La Ferrière
37107	37350	Ferrière-Larçon
37108	37600	Ferrière-sur-Beaulieu
37109	37230	Fondettes
37110	37150	Francueil
37111	37460	Genillé
37112	37340	Gizeux
37113	37350	Le Grand-Pressigny
37114	37350	La Guerche
37116	37110	Les Hermites
37117	37340	Hommes
37118	37420	Huismes
37119	37220	L'Île-Bouchard
37121	37120	Jaulnay
37122	37300	Joué-lès-Tours
37123	37130	Langeais
37124	37270	Larçay
37125	37120	Lémeré
37126	37500	Lerné
37127	37460	Le Liège
37128	37130	Lignières-de-Touraine
37129	37500	Ligré
37130	37240	Ligueil
37131	37530	Limeray
37132	37600	Loches
37133	37460	Loché-sur-Indrois
37134	37320	Louans
37136	37240	Le Louroux
37137	37330	Lublé
37138	37400	Lussault-sur-Loire
37139	37230	Luynes
37140	37120	Luzé

INSEE	Postal	Commune
37141	37150	Luzillé
37142	37800	Maillé
37143	37240	Manthelan
37144	37500	Marçay
37145	37160	Marcé-sur-Esves
37146	37330	Marcilly-sur-Maulne
37147	37800	Marcilly-sur-Vienne
37148	37120	Marigny-Marmande
37149	37370	Marray
37150	37130	Mazières-de-Touraine
37151	37390	La Membrolle-sur-Choisille
37152	37390	Mettray
37153	37380	Monnaie
37154	37250	Montbazon
37155	37110	Monthodon
37156	37270	Montlouis-sur-Loire
37157	37460	Montrésor
37158	37530	Montreuil-en-Touraine
37159	37260	Monts
37160	37110	Morand
37161	37530	Mosnes
37162	37600	Mouzay
37163	37530	Nazelles-Négron
37165	37190	Neuil
37166	37380	Neuillé-le-Lierre
37167	37360	Neuillé-Pont-Pierre
37168	37160	Neuilly-le-Brignon
37169	37110	Neuville-sur-Brenne
37170	37370	Neuvy-le-Roi
37171	37210	Noizay
37172	37390	Notre-Dame-d'Oé
37173	37460	Nouans-les-Fontaines
37174	37800	Nouâtre
37175	37380	Nouzilly
37176	37800	Noyant-de-Touraine
37177	37460	Orbigny
37178	37220	Panzoult
37179	37210	Parçay-Meslay
37180	37220	Parçay-sur-Vienne
37181	37350	Paulmy
37182	37230	Pernay
37183	37600	Perrusson
37184	37350	Le Petit-Pressigny
37185	37530	Pocé-sur-Cisse
37186	37260	Pont-de-Ruan
37187	37800	Ports-sur-Vienne
37188	37800	Pouzay
37189	37290	Preuilly-sur-Claise
37190	37800	Pussigny
37191	37120	Razines
37192	37310	Reignac-sur-Indre
37193	37140	Restigné
37194	37380	Reugny
37195	37520	La Riche
37196	37120	Richelieu
37197	37420	Rigny-Ussé
37198	37340	Rillé
37199	37220	Rilly-sur-Vienne
37200	37190	Rivarennes
37201	37500	Rivière
37202	37500	La Roche-Clermault
37203	37210	Rochecorbon
37204	37360	Rouziers-de-Touraine
37205	37190	Saché
37206	37360	Saint-Antoine-du-Rocher
37207	37370	Saint-Aubin-le-Dépeint
37208	37550	Saint-Avertin
37210	37500	Saint-Benoît-la-Forêt
37211	37320	Saint-Branchs
37213	37370	Saint-Christophe-sur-le-Nais
37214	37540	Saint-Cyr-sur-Loire
37212	37800	Sainte-Catherine-de-Fierbois
37226	37800	Sainte-Maure-de-Touraine
37216	37800	Saint-Épain
37217	37230	Saint-Étienne-de-Chigny
37218	37600	Saint-Flovier
37219	37510	Saint-Genouph
37220	37500	Saint-Germain-sur-Vienne
37221	37600	Saint-Hippolyte
37222	37600	Saint-Jean-Saint-Germain
37223	37330	Saint-Laurent-de-Lin
37224	37380	Saint-Laurent-en-Gâtines
37225	37270	Saint-Martin-le-Beau
37228	37140	Saint-Nicolas-de-Bourgueil
37229	37110	Saint-Nicolas-des-Motets
37230	37530	Saint-Ouen-les-Vignes
37231	37370	Saint-Paterne-Racan
37233	37700	Saint-Pierre-des-Corps
37234	37310	Saint-Quentin-sur-Indrois
37236	37530	Saint-Règle
37237	37390	Saint-Roch
37238	37600	Saint-Senoch
37240	37110	Saunay
37241	37340	Savigné-sur-Lathan
37242	37420	Savigny-en-Véron
37243	37510	Savonnières
37244	37220	Sazilly
37245	37360	Semblançay
37246	37600	Sennevières
37247	37800	Sepmes
37248	37500	Seuilly
37249	37360	Sonzay
37250	37250	Sorigny
37251	37330	Souvigné
37252	37530	Souvigny-de-Touraine
37253	37310	Sublaines
37254	37310	Tauxigny-Saint-Bauld
37255	37220	Tavant
37256	37220	Theneuil
37257	37260	Thilouze
37258	37500	Thizay
37259	37290	Tournon-Saint-Pierre
37261	37000	Tours
37260	37120	La Tour-Saint-Gelin
37262	37220	Trogues
37263	37320	Truyes
37264	37190	Vallères
37265	37600	Varennes
37266	37250	Veigné
37267	37270	Véretz
37268	37120	Verneuil-le-Château
37269	37600	Verneuil-sur-Indre
37270	37210	Vernou-sur-Brenne
37271	37190	Villaines-les-Rochers
37272	37510	Villandry
37273	37700	La Ville-aux-Dames
37274	37370	Villebourg
37275	37460	Villedômain
37276	37110	Villedômer
37277	37460	Villeloin-Coulangé
37278	37260	Villeperdue
37279	37330	Villiers-au-Bouin
37280	37240	Vou
37281	37210	Vouvray
37282	37290	Yzeures-sur-Creuse
