= Saint-Épain =

- Commune
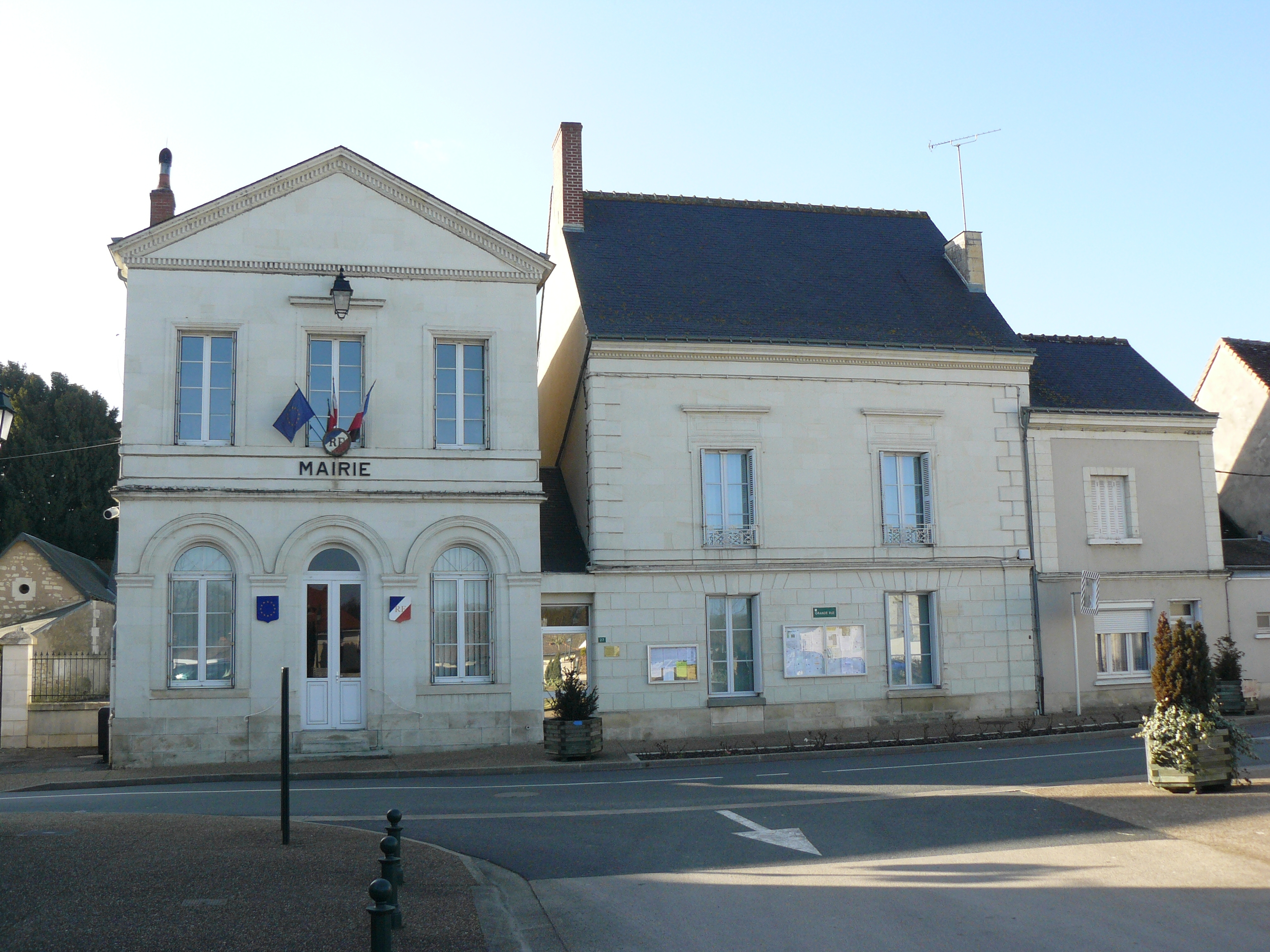
- Town hall

- Coat of arms
- Location of Saint-Épain
- Location within France Location within Centre-Val de Loire
- Coordinates: 47°08′46″N 0°32′16″E
- Country: France
- Region: Centre-Val de Loire
- Department: Indre-et-Loire
- Arrondissement: Chinon
- Canton: Sainte-Maure-de-Touraine

Government
  - Mayor (2020–2026): Florence Boullier
- Area^{1}: 62.65 km^{2} (24.19 sq mi)
- Highest elevation: 122 m (400 ft)
- Lowest elevation: 47 m (154 ft)
- Population (2023): 1,471
  - Density: 23.48/km^{2} (60.81/sq mi)
- Time zone: UTC+01:00 (CET)
  - Summer (DST): UTC+02:00 (CEST)
- INSEE/Postal code: 37216 /37800
- ^{1} French Land Register data, which excludes lakes, ponds, glaciers > 1 km^{2} (0.386 sq mi or 247 acres) and river estuaries.

Saint-Épain (French pronunciation: [sɛ̃.t‿epɛ̃]) is a commune in the Indre-et-Loire department in central France.

== Population ==
Historical population
Year	Pop.	±% p.a.
1968	1,525	—
1975	1,338	−1.85%
1982	1,409	+0.74%
1990	1,335	−0.67%
1999	1,418	+0.67%
2007	1,529	+0.95%
2012	1,552	+0.30%
2017	1,572	+0.26%
2023	1,471	−1.10%
Source: INSEE

== See also ==
- Communes of the Indre-et-Loire department
