= Braslou =

- Commune
- Location of Braslou
- Location within France Location within Centre-Val de Loire
- Coordinates: 47°00′02″N 0°23′35″E
- Country: France
- Region: Centre-Val de Loire
- Department: Indre-et-Loire
- Arrondissement: Chinon
- Canton: Sainte-Maure-de-Touraine

Government
  - Mayor (2020–2026): Claudine Leclerc
- Area^{1}: 15.79 km^{2} (6.10 sq mi)
- Highest elevation: 131 m (430 ft)
- Lowest elevation: 5 m (16 ft)
- Population (2023): 319
  - Density: 20.2/km^{2} (52.3/sq mi)
- Time zone: UTC+01:00 (CET)
  - Summer (DST): UTC+02:00 (CEST)
- INSEE/Postal code: 37034 /37120
- ^{1} French Land Register data, which excludes lakes, ponds, glaciers > 1 km^{2} (0.386 sq mi or 247 acres) and river estuaries.

Braslou (French pronunciation: [bʁalu]) is a commune in the Indre-et-Loire department in central France.

== Population ==
Historical population
Year	Pop.	±% p.a.
1968	438	—
1975	397	−1.39%
1982	360	−1.39%
1990	367	+0.24%
1999	326	−1.31%
2007	343	+0.64%
2012	302	−2.51%
2017	306	+0.26%
2023	319	+0.70%
Source: INSEE

== See also ==
- Communes of the Indre-et-Loire department
