= Cravant-les-Côteaux =

- Commune
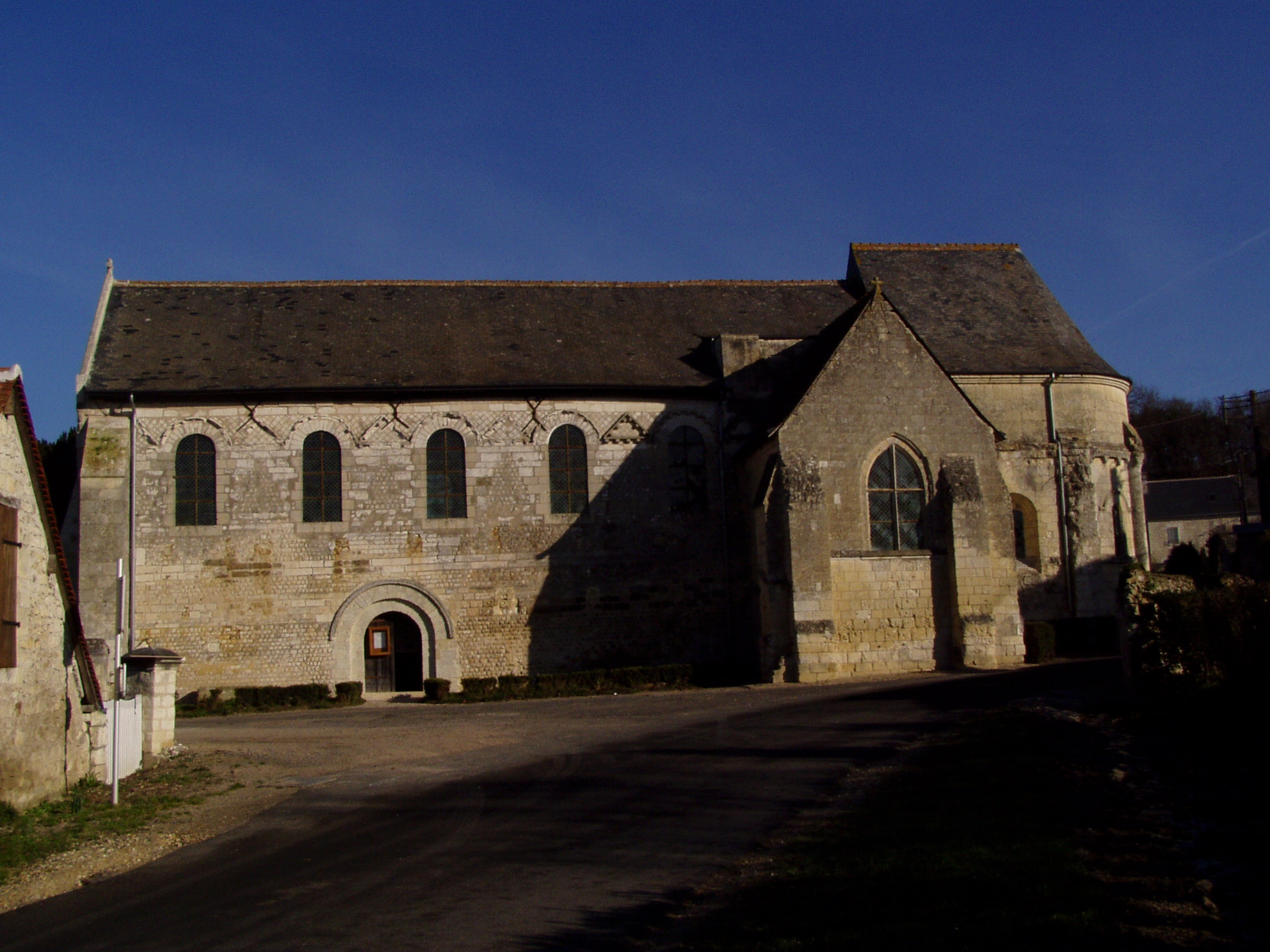
- The church in Cravant-les-Côteaux
- Location of Cravant-les-Côteaux
- Location within France Location within Centre-Val de Loire
- Coordinates: 47°09′31″N 0°20′51″E
- Country: France
- Region: Centre-Val de Loire
- Department: Indre-et-Loire
- Arrondissement: Chinon
- Canton: Sainte-Maure-de-Touraine

Government
  - Mayor (2020–2026): Christophe Baudry
- Area^{1}: 38.21 km^{2} (14.75 sq mi)
- Highest elevation: 121 m (397 ft)
- Lowest elevation: 27 m (89 ft)
- Population (2023): 699
  - Density: 18.3/km^{2} (47.4/sq mi)
- Time zone: UTC+01:00 (CET)
  - Summer (DST): UTC+02:00 (CEST)
- INSEE/Postal code: 37089 /37500
- ^{1} French Land Register data, which excludes lakes, ponds, glaciers > 1 km^{2} (0.386 sq mi or 247 acres) and river estuaries.

Cravant-les-Côteaux (French pronunciation: [kʁavɑ̃ le koto]) is a commune in the Indre-et-Loire department in central France.

== Population ==
Historical population
Year	Pop.	±% p.a.
1968	751	—
1975	681	−1.39%
1982	715	+0.70%
1990	747	+0.55%
1999	751	+0.06%
2007	725	−0.44%
2012	730	+0.14%
2017	672	−1.64%
2023	699	+0.66%
Source: INSEE

== See also ==
- Communes of the Indre-et-Loire department
