= Pouzay =

- Commune
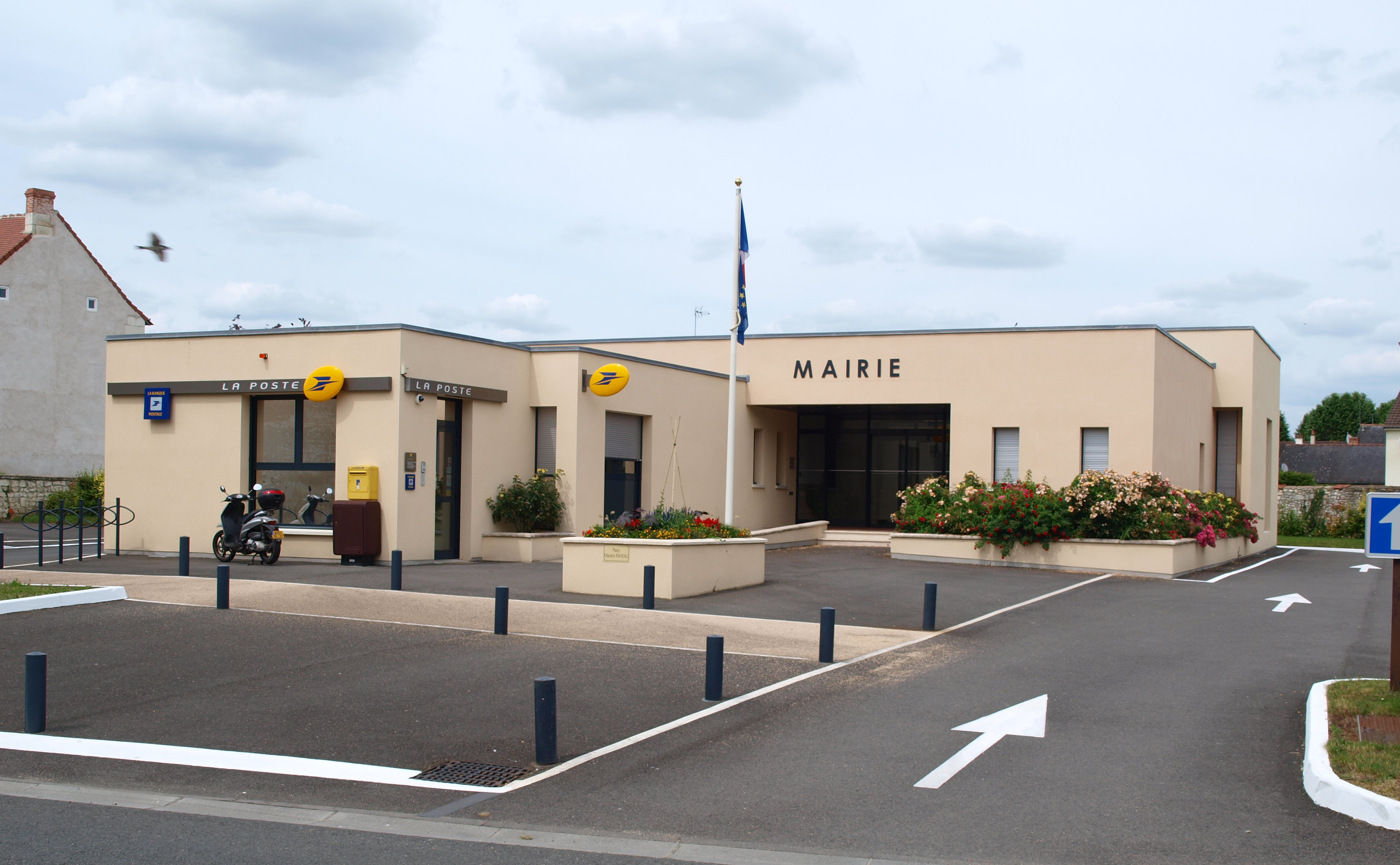
- The town hall and the post office in Pouzay
- Location of Pouzay
- Location within France Location within Centre-Val de Loire
- Coordinates: 47°04′58″N 0°32′06″E
- Country: France
- Region: Centre-Val de Loire
- Department: Indre-et-Loire
- Arrondissement: Chinon
- Canton: Sainte-Maure-de-Touraine

Government
  - Mayor (2020–2026): Françoise Morin
- Area^{1}: 14.07 km^{2} (5.43 sq mi)
- Highest elevation: 99 m (325 ft)
- Lowest elevation: 32 m (105 ft)
- Population (2023): 867
  - Density: 61.6/km^{2} (160/sq mi)
- Time zone: UTC+01:00 (CET)
  - Summer (DST): UTC+02:00 (CEST)
- INSEE/Postal code: 37188 /37800
- ^{1} French Land Register data, which excludes lakes, ponds, glaciers > 1 km^{2} (0.386 sq mi or 247 acres) and river estuaries.

Pouzay (French pronunciation: [puzɛ]) is a commune in the Indre-et-Loire department in central France.

== Population ==
Historical population
Year	Pop.	±% p.a.
1968	759	—
1975	696	−1.23%
1982	736	+0.80%
1990	696	−0.70%
1999	755	+0.91%
2007	792	+0.60%
2012	833	+1.01%
2017	878	+1.06%
2023	867	−0.21%
Source: INSEE

== See also ==
- Communes of the Indre-et-Loire department
