= Couesmes =

- Commune
- Coat of arms
- Location of Couesmes
- Location within France Location within Centre-Val de Loire
- Coordinates: 47°33′52″N 0°20′33″E
- Country: France
- Region: Centre-Val de Loire
- Department: Indre-et-Loire
- Arrondissement: Chinon
- Canton: Langeais

Government
  - Mayor (2020–2026): Nicolas Veauvy
- Area^{1}: 19.12 km^{2} (7.38 sq mi)
- Highest elevation: 128 m (420 ft)
- Lowest elevation: 58 m (190 ft)
- Population (2023): 543
  - Density: 28.4/km^{2} (73.6/sq mi)
- Time zone: UTC+01:00 (CET)
  - Summer (DST): UTC+02:00 (CEST)
- INSEE/Postal code: 37084 /37330
- ^{1} French Land Register data, which excludes lakes, ponds, glaciers > 1 km^{2} (0.386 sq mi or 247 acres) and river estuaries.

Couesmes is a commune in the Indre-et-Loire department in central France.

== Population ==
Historical population
Year	Pop.	±% p.a.
1968	606	—
1975	515	−2.30%
1982	499	−0.45%
1990	490	−0.23%
1999	496	+0.14%
2007	528	+0.78%
2012	529	+0.04%
2017	501	−1.08%
2023	543	+1.35%
Source: INSEE

== See also ==
- Communes of the Indre-et-Loire department
