= Canton of Sainte-Maure-de-Touraine =

Coordinates: 47.11°N 0.62°E

- Canton
- Location of the canton of Sainte-Maure-de-Touraine in the department of Indre-et-Loire
- Country: France
- Region: Centre-Val de Loire
- Department: Indre-et-Loire
- No. of communes: {{{nbcomm}}}
- Established: 1959

Government
  - Representatives (2021–2028): Nadège Arnault; Etienne Martegoutte
- Area: 746 km^{2} (288 sq mi)
- Population (2023): 26,392
  - Density: 35.4/km^{2} (91.6/sq mi)
- INSEE code: 37 13

The canton of Sainte-Maure-de-Touraine is an administrative division of the Indre-et-Loire department, central France. Its borders were modified at the French canton reorganisation which came into effect in March 2015. Its seat is in Sainte-Maure-de-Touraine.

== Composition ==
=== Prior to 2015 ===
The canton of Sainte-Maure-de-Touraine contained the 12 communes of:

List of communes in the canton of Sainte-Maure-de-Touraine
Nom	INSEE code	Intercommunality	Population (last legal count)
Sainte-Maure-de-Touraine(Canton seat)	37226	CC Touraine Val de Vienne	4 328 (2014)
Antogny-le-Tillac	37005	CC Touraine Val de Vienne	517 (2013)
Maillé	37142	CC Touraine Val de Vienne	582 (2014)
Marcilly-sur-Vienne	37147	CC Touraine Val de Vienne	544 (2014)
Neuil	37165	CC Touraine Val de Vienne	446 (2014)
Nouâtre	37174	CC Touraine Val de Vienne	825 (2014)
Noyant-de-Touraine	37176	CC Touraine Val de Vienne	1 179 (2014)
Ports	37187	CC Touraine Val de Vienne	354 (2014)
Pouzay	37188	CC Touraine Val de Vienne	840 (2014)
Pussigny	37190	CC Touraine Val de Vienne	175 (2014)
Saint-Épain	37216	CC Touraine Val de Vienne	1 569 (2014)
Sainte-Catherine-de-Fierbois	37212	CC Touraine Vallée de l'Indre	728 (2014)

=== Since 2015 ===
It consists of the following communes:

1. Anché
2. Antogny-le-Tillac
3. Assay
4. Avon-les-Roches
5. Braslou
6. Braye-sous-Faye
7. Brizay
8. Champigny-sur-Veude
9. Chaveignes
10. Chezelles
11. Courcoué
12. Cravant-les-Côteaux
13. Crissay-sur-Manse
14. Crouzilles
15. Faye-la-Vineuse
16. L'Île-Bouchard
17. Jaulnay
18. Lémeré
19. Ligré
20. Luzé
21. Maillé
22. Marcilly-sur-Vienne
23. Marigny-Marmande
24. Neuil
25. Nouâtre
26. Noyant-de-Touraine
27. Panzoult
28. Parçay-sur-Vienne
29. Ports-sur-Vienne
30. Pouzay
31. Pussigny
32. Razines
33. Richelieu
34. Rilly-sur-Vienne
35. Sainte-Catherine-de-Fierbois
36. Sainte-Maure-de-Touraine
37. Saint-Épain
38. Sazilly
39. Tavant
40. Theneuil
41. La Tour-Saint-Gelin
42. Trogues
43. Verneuil-le-Château
