= Chezelles, Indre-et-Loire =

Chezelles
- Commune
- Location of Chezelles
- Location within France Location within Centre-Val de Loire
- Coordinates: 47°03′32″N 0°26′34″E
- Country: France
- Region: Centre-Val de Loire
- Department: Indre-et-Loire
- Arrondissement: Chinon
- Canton: Sainte-Maure-de-Touraine

Government
  - Mayor (2020–2026): Christian Pimbert
- Area^{1}: 15.17 km^{2} (5.86 sq mi)
- Highest elevation: 122 m (400 ft)
- Lowest elevation: 45 m (148 ft)
- Population (2023): 130
  - Density: 8.6/km^{2} (22/sq mi)
- Time zone: UTC+01:00 (CET)
  - Summer (DST): UTC+02:00 (CEST)
- INSEE/Postal code: 37071 /37220
- ^{1} French Land Register data, which excludes lakes, ponds, glaciers > 1 km^{2} (0.386 sq mi or 247 acres) and river estuaries.

Chezelles (French pronunciation: [ʃəzɛl]) is a commune in the Indre-et-Loire department in central France.

== Population ==
Historical population
Year	Pop.	±% p.a.
1968	263	—
1975	197	−4.04%
1982	146	−4.19%
1990	144	−0.17%
1999	130	−1.13%
2007	142	+1.11%
2012	132	−1.45%
2017	133	+0.15%
2023	130	−0.38%
Source: INSEE

== See also ==
- Communes of the Indre-et-Loire department
