= Faye-la-Vineuse =

- Commune
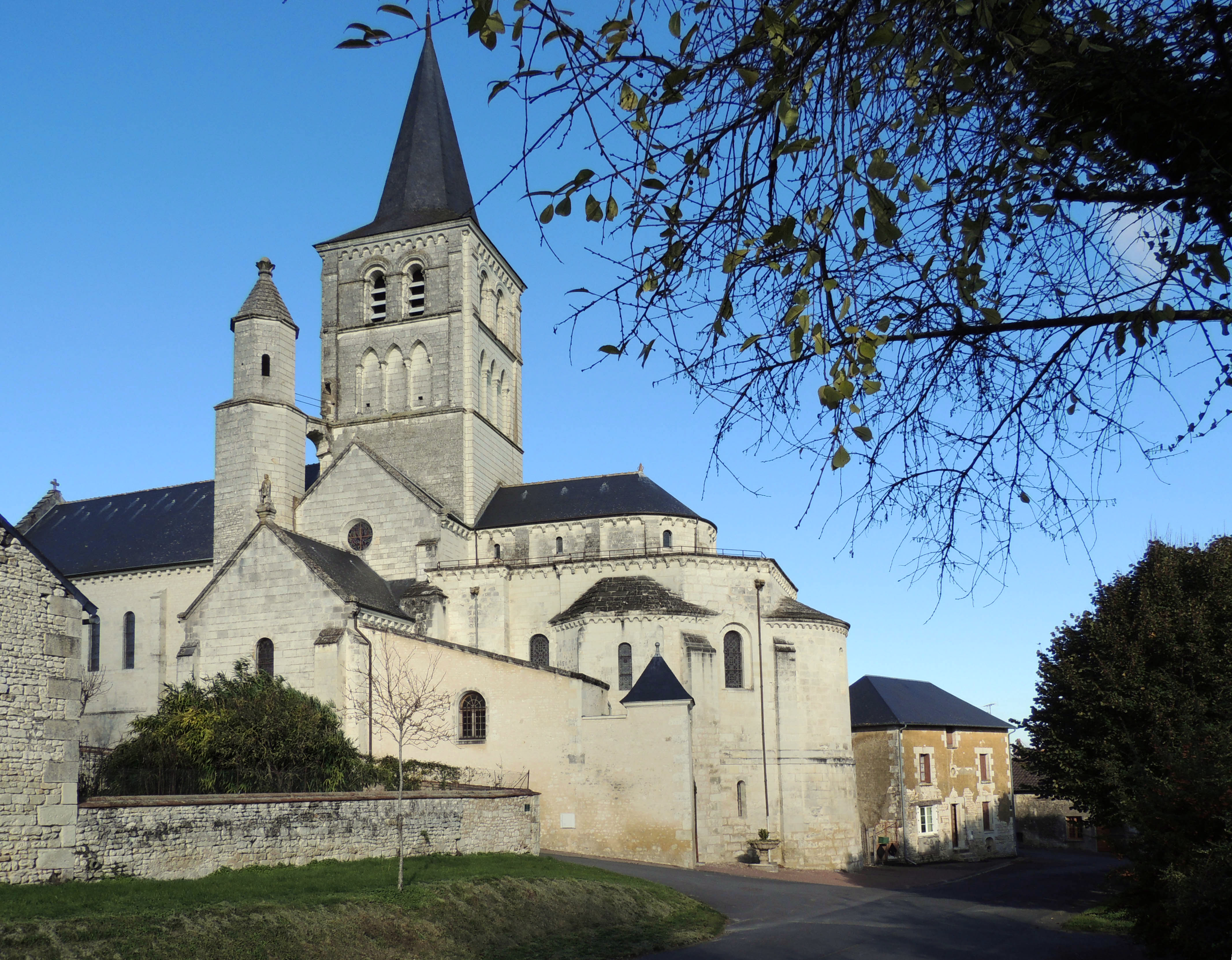
- The collegiate church of Saint-Georges, in Faye-la-Vineuse
- Location of Faye-la-Vineuse
- Location within France Location within Centre-Val de Loire
- Coordinates: 46°57′28″N 0°20′28″E
- Country: France
- Region: Centre-Val de Loire
- Department: Indre-et-Loire
- Arrondissement: Chinon
- Canton: Sainte-Maure-de-Touraine

Government
  - Mayor (2020–2026): David Cailleteau
- Area^{1}: 17.55 km^{2} (6.78 sq mi)
- Highest elevation: 131 m (430 ft)
- Lowest elevation: 62 m (203 ft)
- Population (2023): 272
  - Density: 15.5/km^{2} (40.1/sq mi)
- Time zone: UTC+01:00 (CET)
  - Summer (DST): UTC+02:00 (CEST)
- INSEE/Postal code: 37105 /37120
- ^{1} French Land Register data, which excludes lakes, ponds, glaciers > 1 km^{2} (0.386 sq mi or 247 acres) and river estuaries.

Faye-la-Vineuse (French pronunciation: [fɛ la vinøz]) is a commune in the Indre-et-Loire department in central France.

== Population ==
Historical population
Year	Pop.	±% p.a.
1968	597	—
1975	490	−2.78%
1982	409	−2.55%
1990	343	−2.18%
1999	285	−2.04%
2007	313	+1.18%
2012	286	−1.79%
2017	253	−2.42%
2023	272	+1.21%
Source: INSEE

== See also ==
- Communes of the Indre-et-Loire department
