= Anché, Indre-et-Loire =

Anché
- Commune
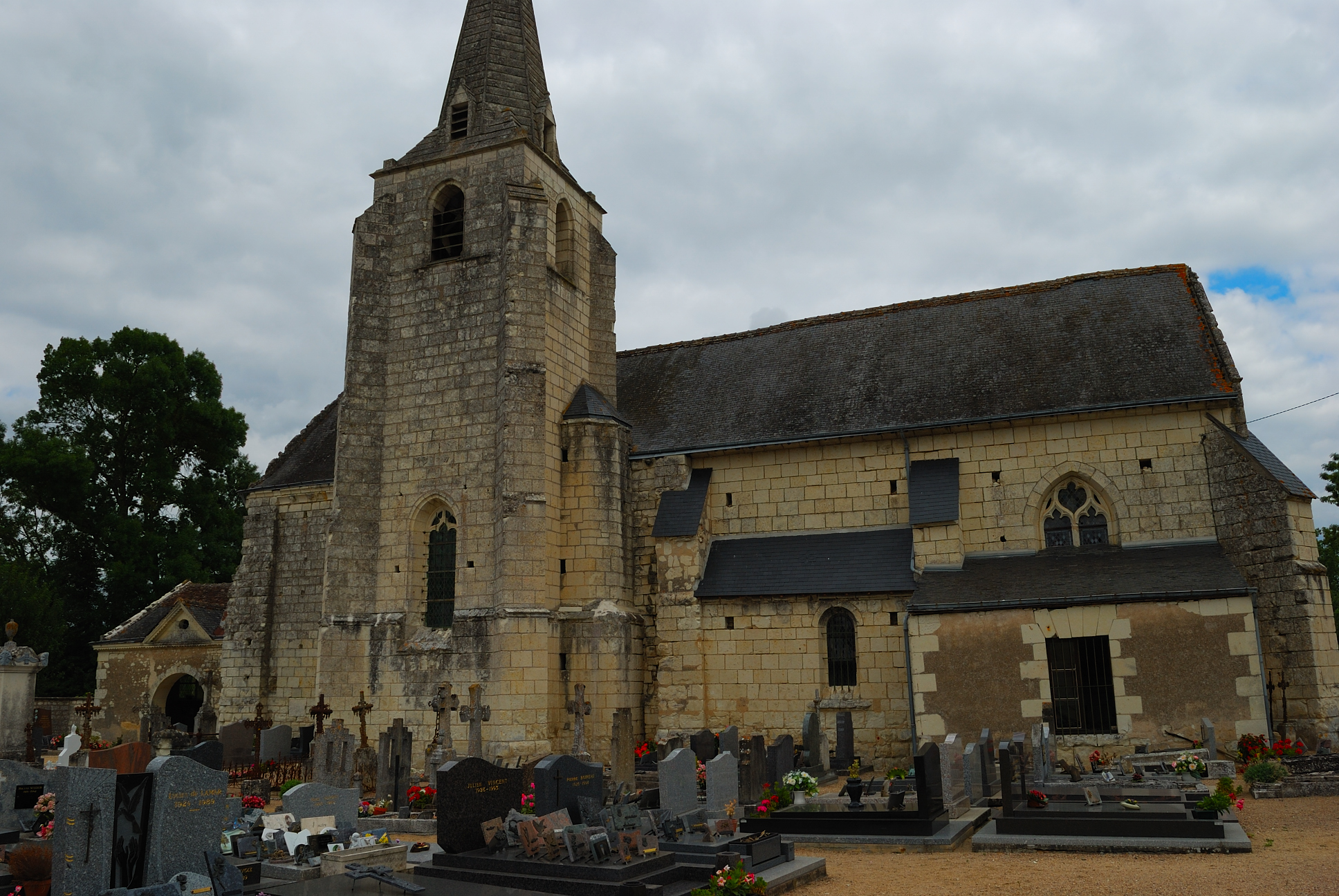
- The church of Saint-Symphorien, in Anché
- Location of Anché
- Location within France Location within Centre-Val de Loire
- Coordinates: 47°08′20″N 0°18′35″E
- Country: France
- Region: Centre-Val de Loire
- Department: Indre-et-Loire
- Arrondissement: Chinon
- Canton: Sainte-Maure-de-Touraine
- Intercommunality: Chinon, Vienne et Loire

Government
  - Mayor (2021–2026): Pascal Lecomte
- Area^{1}: 7.99 km^{2} (3.08 sq mi)
- Highest elevation: 87 m (285 ft)
- Lowest elevation: 28 m (92 ft)
- Population (2023): 426
  - Density: 53.3/km^{2} (138/sq mi)
- Time zone: UTC+01:00 (CET)
  - Summer (DST): UTC+02:00 (CEST)
- INSEE/Postal code: 37004 /37500
- ^{1} French Land Register data, which excludes lakes, ponds, glaciers > 1 km^{2} (0.386 sq mi or 247 acres) and river estuaries.

Anché (French pronunciation: [ɑ̃ʃe]) is a commune in the Indre-et-Loire department in central France.

== Population ==
Historical population
Year	Pop.	±% p.a.
1968	429	—
1975	363	−2.36%
1982	367	+0.16%
1990	347	−0.70%
1999	364	+0.53%
2007	412	+1.56%
2012	415	+0.15%
2017	416	+0.05%
2023	426	+0.40%
Source: INSEE

== See also ==
- Communes of the Indre-et-Loire department
