= National Powder Factory of Ripault =

French military factory

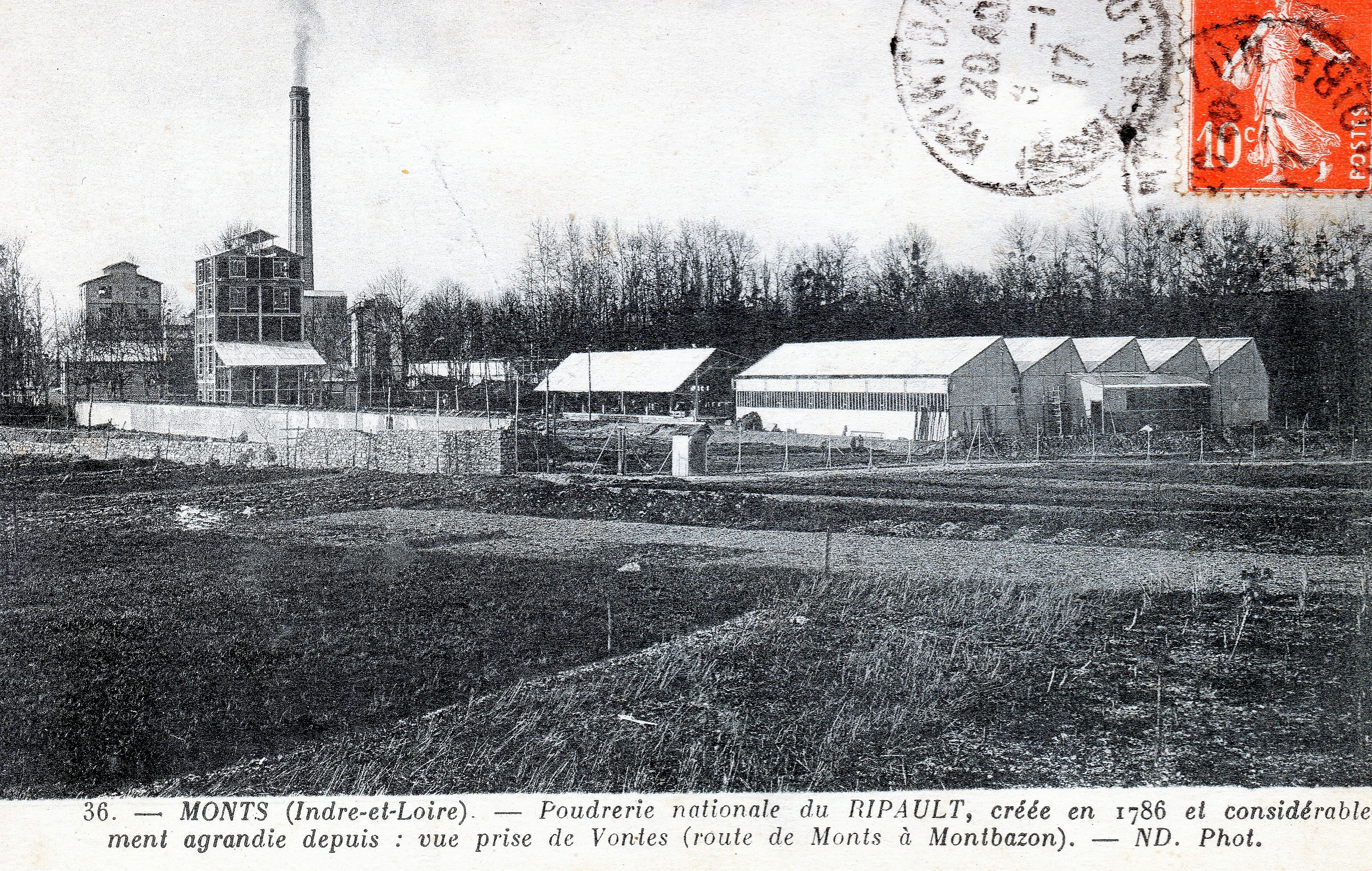
- Partial view of the Ripault site in 1916 (postcard).
- Operated: 1786
- Location: Monts (Indre-et-Loire, Centre-Val de Loire)
- Coordinates: 47°17′39″N 0°40′20″E
- Style: Powder mill
- Area: 120 ha (300 acres)
- Owner: CEA

The National Powder Factory of Ripault is a former powder mill situated within the territory of the French commune of Monts, located in the department of Indre-et-Loire in the Centre-Val de Loire region.

The facility was established on the eve of the Revolution in 1786 by Antoine Lavoisier, General Manager of the Royal Administration of Powders, as a replacement for a wire-drawing mill constructed along the Indre River a few years earlier. The wire-drawing mill was a continuation of the flour mills documented in the 16th century. The facility gained importance throughout the nineteenth century and, in the 1840s, was considered "the most beautiful powder mill in Europe." During the First World War, it employed up to 6,000 workers and underwent significant expansion by producing B powder, which had supplanted black powder. At the start of World War II, at its peak, its facilities extended over 120 hectares.

The history of the company is characterized by periods of expansion that coincided with periods of increased military demand for powder and explosives in France. However, these periods were also marked by accidents, including fires and explosions. The most serious of these incidents resulted in the deaths of at least 74 individuals and injuries to 345 others, with the precise number of casualties remaining uncertain. Additionally, the factory was completely devastated on October 18, 1943, during its occupation by German authorities. Following the resumption of activity in 1945, the significant reduction in demand for explosives forced the company to diversify its activities. This included the production of furniture, paints, and antibiotics, until the factory's closure in 1959.

In 1961, the Commissariat à l'énergie atomique (CEA) assumed control of the site and a significant portion of its workforce, placing it under the direction of the Military applications division (DAM). This arrangement persisted until at least 2018, with the expectation that its activities will continue to expand into the civilian domain in the coming years. An industrial park, encompassing a portion of the land divested by the powder factory after it ceased operations but extending beyond, emerged to the south of the site. A museum, inaccessible to the general public due to its location within the CEA complex, chronicles the history of the powder factory.

== Historical and geographical context of the founding of Ripault ==
The mills of Candé on the Cassini map.

As early as 1764, King Louis XV contemplated the establishment of a powder mill in either Touraine or Anjou. This location, situated along the primary east-west thoroughfares of the Loire Valley and the principal north-south routes traversing Paris to Bordeaux, appeared to offer a strategic advantage. Furthermore, the saltpeter utilized in the production of gunpowder was conducive to its formation on the walls and within the tuffeau quarries of these provinces, due to the temperate and humid climate of the Loire Valley. During the early 1760s, the Generality of Tours provided approximately 450 tons of saltpeter annually to the Saumur refinery. Nevertheless, the endeavors undertaken to identify a suitable location for the powder mill were ultimately unsuccessful.

By 1575, a milling enterprise had already been established on the Indre River, situated northeast of the parish of Monts and adjacent to the border of Montbazon. This enterprise, operating under the name "Moulins de Candé," was near the historic Château de Candé. Following a series of ownership transfers, the mills were ultimately destroyed by a flood of the Indre River in 1770. However, probably, floods had already undermined their structural integrity. This significant flood occurred after the sale to two new proprietors, the transfer of ownership having already been duly executed. The mills were rebuilt in 1772 to power a wire-drawing mill, with the 1.40-meter waterfall providing sufficient mechanical force. This mill operated for the Royal Navy and employed 72 workers. The Duke of Rohan-Guéméné, lord of Montbazon, provided indispensable approval for this transformation. Upon the commencement of operations at the wire-drawing mill, owners situated further downstream on the Indre voiced concerns that the modifications to the river's flow resulting from the factory's activities had reduced their mills’ efficiency. The factory ceased operations in 1785, having been unable to overcome severe financial difficulties, primarily linked to the economic crisis caused by the American War of Independence. Despite several appeals for assistance to King Louis XVI, which went unanswered, the company was ultimately unable to secure the financial support it required to remain operational. Additionally, significant advances made to major clients of the wire-drawing mill, which were never repaid, further burdened the company's finances.

The toponym "Ripault," previously spelled "Ripaux," appears to derive from the Latin ripoe, itself derived from rip(a, ae), meaning "bank of a watercourse" (in this case, the Indre).

== Location ==
The original location of the Ripault powder mill was on the right bank of the Indre, at the border of the present-day communes of Montbazon and Monts, situated between the river and the road (currently D87) connecting the two communes. Subsequently, the company expanded its operations to the south, on the left bank of the Indre, and to the west. However, the construction of the Tours-Bordeaux railway line, which opened in 1851 between Tours and Poitiers, effectively delineated a boundary that could not be traversed in that direction. The village of Monts, situated further to the southwest, was separated from the powder mill by the railway, constructed on a high embankment at that level.

== History ==
=== From the origins to the French Revolution ===
==== A powder mill replaces the wire-drawing mill ====
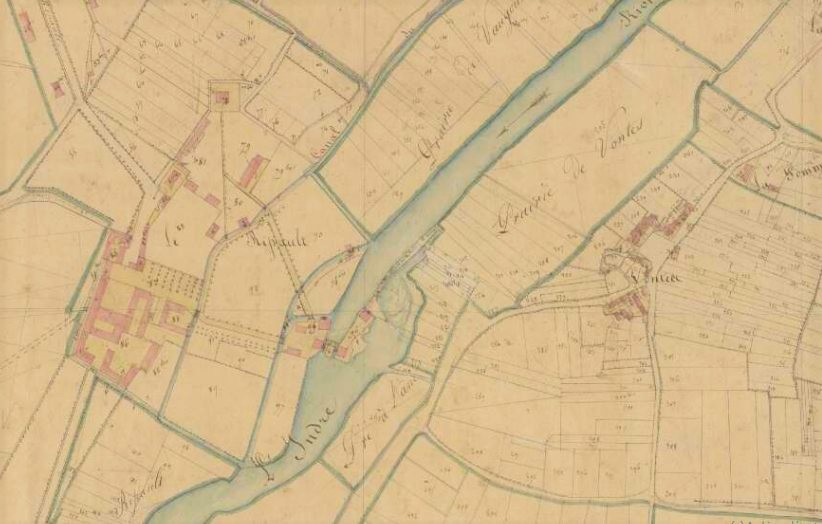
Le Ripault on the Napoleonic cadastre (north is on the left).

In 1786, Antoine Lavoisier, General Manager of the Royal Powder Administration, purchased the wire-drawing mill and established a powder mill, which was placed under the direction of Jean René Denis Riffault des Hêtres. Riffault des Hêtres had resumed the searches initiated under Louis XV and discovered the Ripault site. It seems probable that Riffault, who was a Freemason, made use of his extensive network of connections to identify this site. He was a member of the same Masonic lodge as one of the last owners of the wire-drawing mill. The powder mill operated in the buildings and with the staff of the former wire-drawing mill, whose mills, rebuilt in 1787, (Note: Guénand 1998, p. 117) powered the hammers used to crush and mix saltpeter, charcoal, and sulfur, which constituted the basic ingredients of gunpowder. By 1788, the powder mill covered ten hectares on the right bank of the Indre, with four mills operating 80 hammers, 12 workshops, grainers, dryers, warehouses, staff housing, and a chapel, which was converted into a dryer in 1793. (Note: Guénand 1998, p. 151) This is the only building from that period still standing in the 21st century. The workforce resided outside the boundaries of the powder mill complex. By 1789, the powder mill employed approximately one hundred individuals, who appeared to be entitled to free and comprehensive medical care. Until 1791, the business expanded by purchasing land from the proprietors of Château de Candé. During this period, the production of war powder, mining powder, and hunting powder was undertaken. (Note: Guénand 1998, p. 119) However, the prosperity of the powder mill gave rise to conflicts with neighboring landowners, particularly those with meadows upstream of the factory. These landowners found their pastures frequently flooded by the Indre floods since Ripault had built dams to regulate water for the mills. (Note: Guénand 1998, p. 101) Additionally, the workers' special tax-exempt status caused some jealousy among other residents.

==== Temporary threat of closure ====
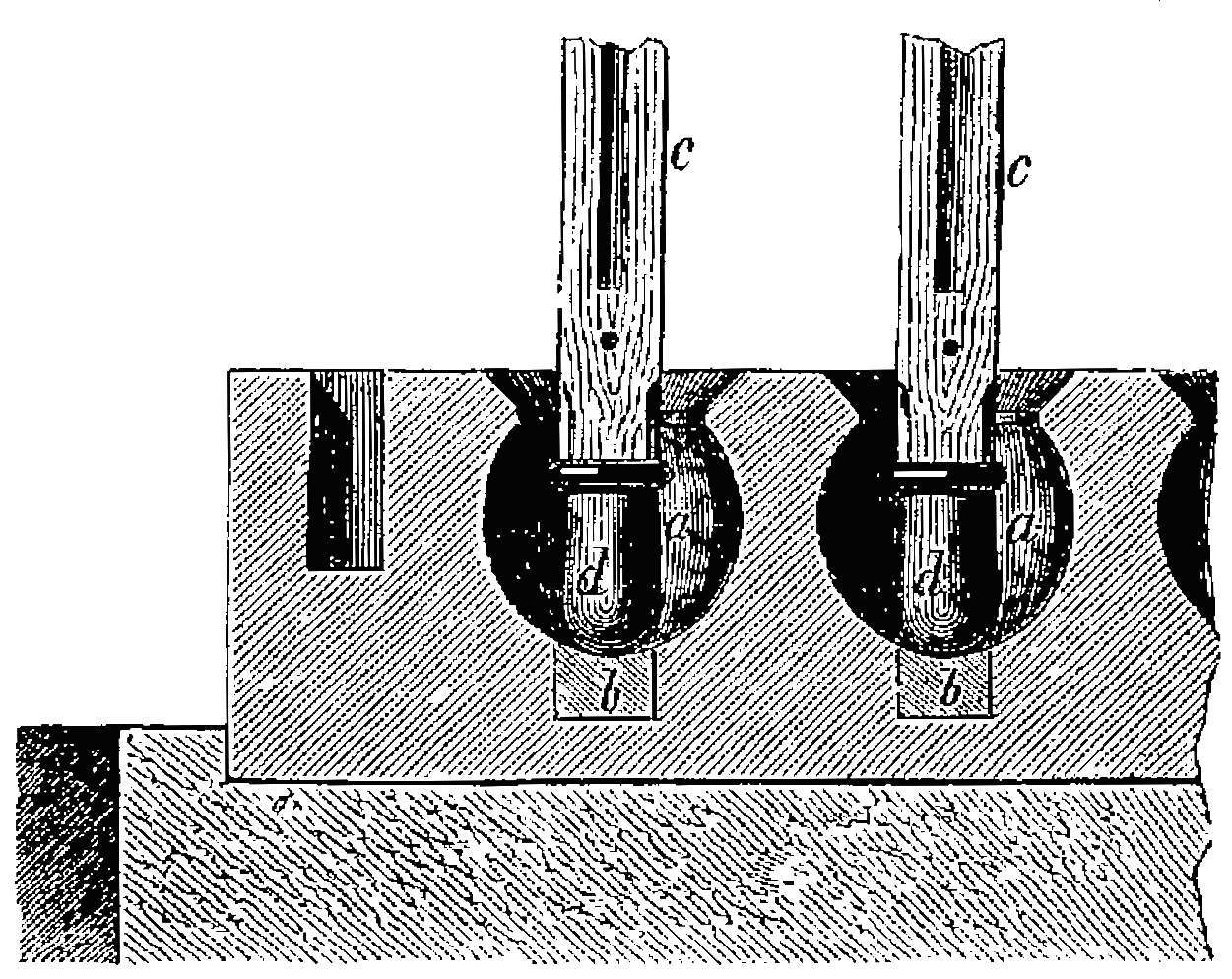
Pestles and mortars for gunpowder factories.

Nevertheless, during the early 1790s, despite the increased demand for powder resulting from the Patrie en danger declaration, the viability of the powder mill was called into question. A novel method of manufacturing powder was devised in the Paris region, offering a significantly more expeditious (a mere few hours) and straightforward alternative to the conventional hammer system. The government subsequently mandated the cessation of this traditional method, seeking to consolidate production close to Paris. This resulted in one of the few instances of labor unrest in the powder mill's history, as evidenced by the strike that commenced on September 10, 1793. To demonstrate the competitiveness of his facility, Riffault improved the hammer technique, invented a rapid drying process in a kiln, and revived Ripault, which was officially maintained in 1796. Meanwhile, the War in the Vendée increased the demand for powder in western France, which benefited Ripault. Furthermore, the explosion of the Grenelle powder mill on August 30, 1794 (which resulted in the deaths of approximately 536 individuals and injuries to 827) prompted a shift in production to provincial sites. Consequently, Ripault provided the troops engaged in combat in Tours and throughout the Loire Valley, as well as in Mayenne. In the decades following its establishment, the Ripault powder mill established "satellite" storage facilities in Bourges, Châtellerault, Le Mans, Limoges, Saumur, and Tours. (Note: Guénand 1998, pp. 154–168) From the latter location, powder for the Atlantic ports of the Navy was transported down the Loire. (Note: Guénand 1998, p. 286)

=== From the Empire to World War I ===
==== Successive expansions in the 19th century ====
Following the withdrawal from Russia, the imperial army required substantial reinforcements, necessitating a significant expansion of its personnel through extensive recruitment. Those employed by Ripault were exempt from conscription, provided they were married, which made employment at the powder mill an attractive proposition. The initial configuration, comprising four powder mills on a 9-hectare site, was expanded in 1815 and subsequently encompassed 22 hectares on the right bank of the river. This expansion enabled the production of 250 tons of black powder annually (Note: According to Amans-Alexis Monteil, who visited the Ripault in the early 19th century, the black powder manufactured there was composed of 76% saltpeter, 14% charcoal, and 10% sulfur.) with a workforce of 40 workers overseen by four officers. The production of saltpeter and charcoal from buckthorn wood at Ripault was conducted on a regional scale. The former was sourced from the Cher, Indre-et-Loire, and Sarthe departments, (Note: Guénand 1998, p. 181) while the latter was extracted from volcanic regions in southern Italy (Note: Guénand 1998, p. 180) and refined in Marseille before being transported.

During the reign of Louis-Philippe, the Ripault was regarded as the most aesthetically pleasing powder factory in Europe, with its products distributed extensively throughout France. Other powder factories, such as those in Esquerdes or Vonges, also engage in commercial activities with the Ripault. (Note: Guénand 1998, pp. 291–303) A study conducted in the 1830s on the properties of French gunpowder demonstrated that, while Ripault powder was not the most powerful, it caused less damage to the weapons that used it. In 1848, following the June Days, the workforce at the Ripault initiated a strike and proceeded towards Tours. However, Canon François Manceau was able to successfully negotiate their return to Monts. In the same year, the current network of canals was established, as was the inaugural mill-equipped factory, which eventually supplanted using stampers. (Note: Guénand 2007, p. 136) In 1851, the company undertook a further expansion with the purchase of land on the left bank of the Indre. At this time, the Ripault factory employed between 200 and 300 people. (Note: Guénand 2007, p. 110) In 1864, the powder factory produced three varieties of powder: war powder, mining powder, and hunting powder. These were intended for the domestic market and export. (Note: Guénand 2007, p. 116) In the following year, the Ripault and four other powder factories were placed under the authority of the Ministry of War. Their production was dedicated exclusively to military use, while other establishments manufactured civilian powder. To meet the demands of Napoleon III's wars (Crimea, Italy, and Mexico), the powder factory underwent extensive renovations, including the exchange of equipment between facilities. Additionally, the enclosure of the Ripault, which still stands today, was constructed on the right bank of the Indre.

During the Franco-Prussian War in 1870, the Ripault was occupied and partially looted by Prussian troops. However, the majority of the machinery had been dismantled in advance and relocated to the national powder factory in Toulouse. Consequently, the plant in Touraine was evacuated around December 10, 1870. In 1873, the government opted to install steam-powered machinery on the premises. In a similar vein, an additional 20 hectares were purchased on the left bank of the Indre, and the powder factory was extended to the Montbazon road. Moreover, during the initial six months of the 1870s, as a consequence of the annexation of Alsace-Lorraine, the Ripault facility welcomed numerous employees from the Metz national powder factory who sought to retain their French nationality. Consequently, the population of Monts experienced a notable increase during that period. On May 4, 1875, Marshal MacMahon, then President of the Republic, paid a visit to the Ripault. In 1879, a flood of the Indre swept away the stone bridge within the factory compound that spanned the river. It was subsequently rebuilt in metal. In 1894, the factory commenced production of smokeless powder, or powder B, invented in 1884 by Paul Vieille. This marked a significant technological shift for the Ripault, with the production of black powder gradually being replaced (Note: Guénand 2007, p. 135) (which ceased in 1907 (Note: Guénand 2007, p. 139)). By that time, the powder factory covered an area of 50 hectares. Additionally, the Ripault participated in studies aimed at improving powder production.

==== World War I ====
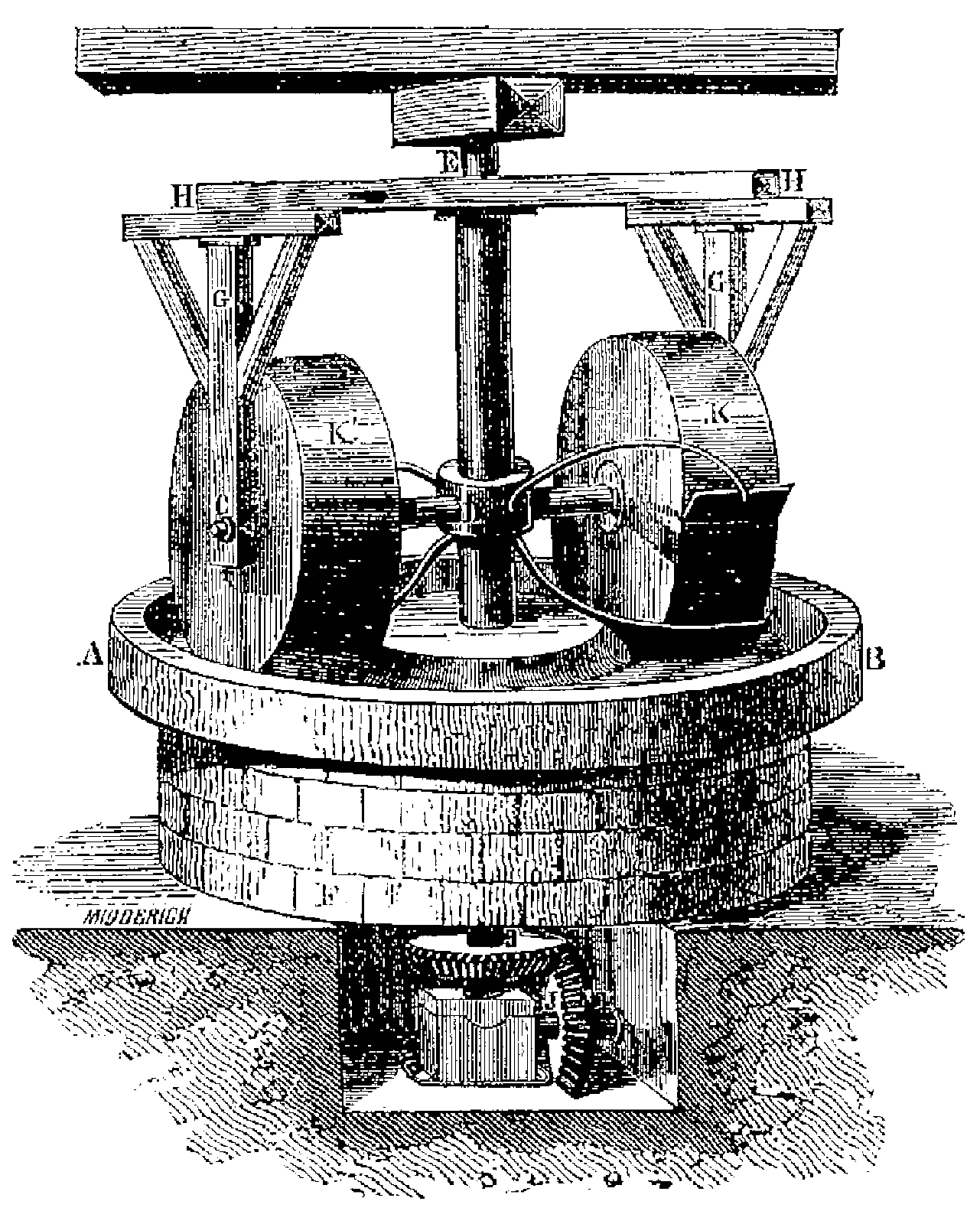
Grinding mill for gunpowder.

In 1910, Victor-Eugène Ardouin-Dumazet, during his visit to Touraine, described the powder factory as a collection of small buildings dispersed within an idyllic rural landscape. In the period preceding the First World War, between 1911 and 1914, the factory was equipped with three presses, a thermal power plant, and a connection to the Paris-Bordeaux railway line from Monts station. (Note: Guénand 2007, p. 138) The factory subsequently expanded westward to the base of the embankment of the railway, having purchased the requisite land from the "La Bade" farm. This location is already mentioned on Cassini map. During wartime, the factory employed up to 6,000 workers, including 1,270 women, and spanned 56 hectares. By 1917, this had expanded to 87 hectares, with the construction of a new factory south of the original site. This was a direct result of the army's needs and was dedicated to producing powder B, which alone employed approximately 3,500 people. By 1918, the factory's total area covered 108 hectares. (Note: Guénand 2007, p. 161) In addition to the main site, the Ripault also had several annex factories in other regions, such as the one in Paimbœuf, which supplied it with sulfuric acid.

Following the restoration of peace in 1920, the recently constructed powder B production unit was placed on hold, resulting in a reduction of the workforce to 250 individuals. The Ripault subsequently engaged in the production of an array of explosives, including ballistite and schneidérite (Note: Schneidérite is an explosive composed of 87.5% ammonium nitrate and 12.5% naphthalene, (Note: Guénand 2007, p. 158) developed by Schneider-Creusot and primarily used in weapons produced by the company.) for use in shells.

==== Working conditions and safety at the forefront ====
As early as the nineteenth century, workers at Ripault enjoyed certain social benefits. These included access to medical and surgical care at preferential rates, bathhouses, a school, and a cooperative supply store. In addition, a mutual aid society was established for them. (Note: Guénand 2007, p. 187)

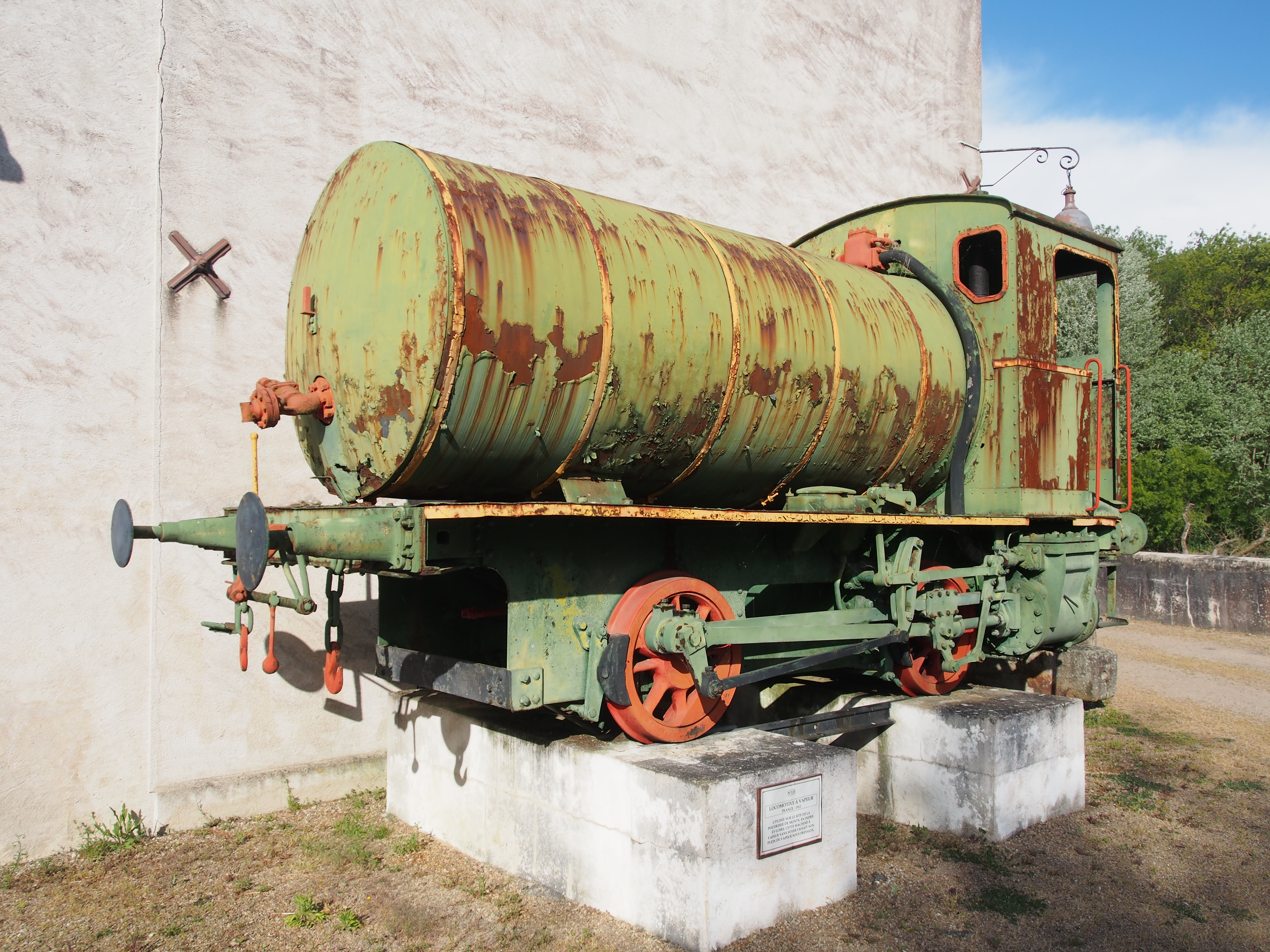
Compressed steam locomotive used at Le Ripault.

From 1843 onward, an internal audit system was implemented to assess the risks associated with accidents and identify measures to mitigate them. The system focused on three key areas: construction materials, staff training, and regular equipment inspections. (Note: Guénand 2007, p. 105) These measures were implemented gradually to limit the risk of fire spreading in the event of an explosion. (Note: The fear of an explosion at the powder plant was constant among the entire population of Touraine. On January 17, 1914, a meteorite crossed the sky of southern Touraine, disintegrating as it passed. The inhabitants of Tours, hearing the detonation, did not imagine an astronomical phenomenon but immediately thought of an explosion at the Ripault.) Consequently, by the early 20th century, the various production workshops and storage areas, which were modest in size, were widely dispersed across the site and separated by embankments and hedges. This explains the large size of the factory.

The green and rural work environment also helped to reduce stress among workers who were constantly fearful of accidents. (Note: Guénand 1998, p. 259) This shared awareness of daily danger fostered a "strong sense of solidarity in the face of adversity, comparable to that of miners in the North." However, this feeling was not reinforced by proximity in daily life, as, in contrast to mining communities, there was no true company town estate at the Ripault. Instead, homes were scattered throughout the Indre Valley, except for temporary camps established in the late 1930s.

Upon entering the site, workers were subjected to a search, during which matches and lighters were confiscated. (Note: Employees were also searched upon leaving the factory to prevent powder theft.) All personnel working within the Ripault facility were required to change into a black uniform made of flame-resistant wool and to wear rubber sandals or non-nailed wooden clogs, all of which were to be maintained on-site. All metal tools were made of copper to prevent the generation of sparks. For safety reasons, the steam required for the factory's railway, installed in 1875 (Note: Guénand 2007, p. 132) (600 mm track gauge, a common size for industrial or military railways), was generated outside the compound. The fireless locomotives constructed by the Swiss Locomotive and Machine Works operated on compressed steam.

Notwithstanding the aforementioned precautions, some explosions and fires occurred at the Ripault in 1811, 1825 (12 fatalities on August 3), 1839, 1877, 1901 (18 deaths on September 18), 1917 (three successive accidents with two victims in total), and 1925. These incidents represent the most severe accidents documented, yet other occurrences were also reported. (Note: A statistical study published in 1866 showed that every powder plant experienced an explosion on average every twenty years.) At the beginning of the 20th century, Victor-Eugène Ardouin-Dumazet observed that workers in other powder factories where powder B was prepared exhibited symptoms of exposure, including "lemon-yellow hands and faces." However, this was not the case for workers at the Ripault, who retained "their fresh and clear complexion." These symptoms were likely caused by inhaling solvent vapors used in the preparation of powder B (ethanol, diethyl ether). These vapors led to the development of occupational diseases that shortened the lifespan of powder factory workers, a phenomenon that affected the Ripaulins (as Ripault workers were called) in the 1930s.

=== From one war to another ===
Evolution of the poudrerie over the years.

Changes in the surface area of Le Ripault from its creation to its transfer to the CEA.

In the interwar period, the Ripault's presence had an unexpected impact on the demographics of neighboring towns. The site, which was under national defense jurisdiction, was prohibited from being settled by foreigners.

In 1937, the factory was reactivated with the installation of a new press and silos, followed by five additional presses in 1939. This expansion resulted in a workforce of 850 workers and an expansion of the factory to 120 hectares. The sector designated as "la Gargouserie" was established to the south of the Montbazon road (now designated as Route D 17). Additionally, beyond the confines of the compound to the east of the site, a firing range was situated, equipped with mortar testers, to evaluate the effects of explosives on weapons. The watertightness of powder containers (wooden crates coated with zinc) was subject to regular inspection through immersion in the Indre. Additionally, the Ripault operated a 50-hectare powder storage facility in Sillars, Vienne. Four camps were constructed to accommodate the Ripaulins, following a similar design, situated at a distance of slightly over a kilometer from the compound. These were located in the following areas: northwest and southwest in Monts, northeast in Veigne, and southeast in Montbazon. (Note: Guénand 2007, p. 236) By the spring of 1940, the powder factory employed 5,708 workers. (Note: Guénand 2007, p. 226) However, the war severely disrupted production. Qualified personnel were replaced by less experienced workers, necessitating a complete reorganization of teams based on workstations. (Note: Guénand 2007, pp. 231–237) Additionally, foreign labor, including Polish and Indochinese workers, was recruited.

On June 17, 1940, (Note: The day before (June 16, 1940), Paul Reynaud resigned as president of the council, leaving Philippe Pétain to form a new cabinet.) production and a portion of the workforce were relocated to Bergerac. Approximately 150 to 200 individuals remained at the Ripault, although the facilities were still maintained. Some of the powder stocks were destroyed on the premises by the directives of the prefect, while others were concealed in the cellars of Château de la Roche-Racan in Saint-Paterne-Racan, situated to the north of the department. (Note: Guénand 2007, p. 213) The powder factory was under the protection of the 32nd Infantry Regiment. (Note: Guénand 2007, p. 201) At that time, Camp de la Lande, one of the camps constructed at the end of 1939 to accommodate Ripault workers, encompassing 26 buildings across 7.5 hectares, was repurposed as an internment camp. From 1940 onwards, following the departure of its usual occupants, it served as a detention center for Polish Jews evacuated from Moselle and expelled from the Bordeaux region. These individuals were subsequently transferred to the Drancy camp and then to Auschwitz in 1942 (14 survivors out of 422 deportees). They were replaced by over 300 communist women from the Paris region.

=== Explosion of October 18, 1943 ===
==== Operation of the powder factory in 1943 ====
By the end of 1942, the occupying authorities had decided to restore the Ripault powder factory (Note: Guénand 2007, p. 219) for the production of powder for the benefit of the German army as part of the "Pulver Plan." (Note: The "Pulver Plan" was a system put in place by the Germans in occupied territories, aiming to increase the production of certain explosives to boost exports to Germany.) The powder was destined for the Eastern Front. The factory operated under French military command with local French personnel, repatriated from Bergerac or Germany. (Note: During this time, French workers at the Ripault did not show great enthusiasm for their tasks, intentionally slowing the plant's production.) Various sources estimate the number of personnel at between 1,000 and 4,000. (Note: The exact workforce at the Ripault is difficult to determine, as the number of workers varied weekly depending on the plant's orders. It is certain, however, that the staff was recruited locally as much as possible, given the required qualifications.) However, half a dozen German officials were present on-site, living within the factory. Their task was limited to verifying the quality of the production.

==== Explosion and casualties ====
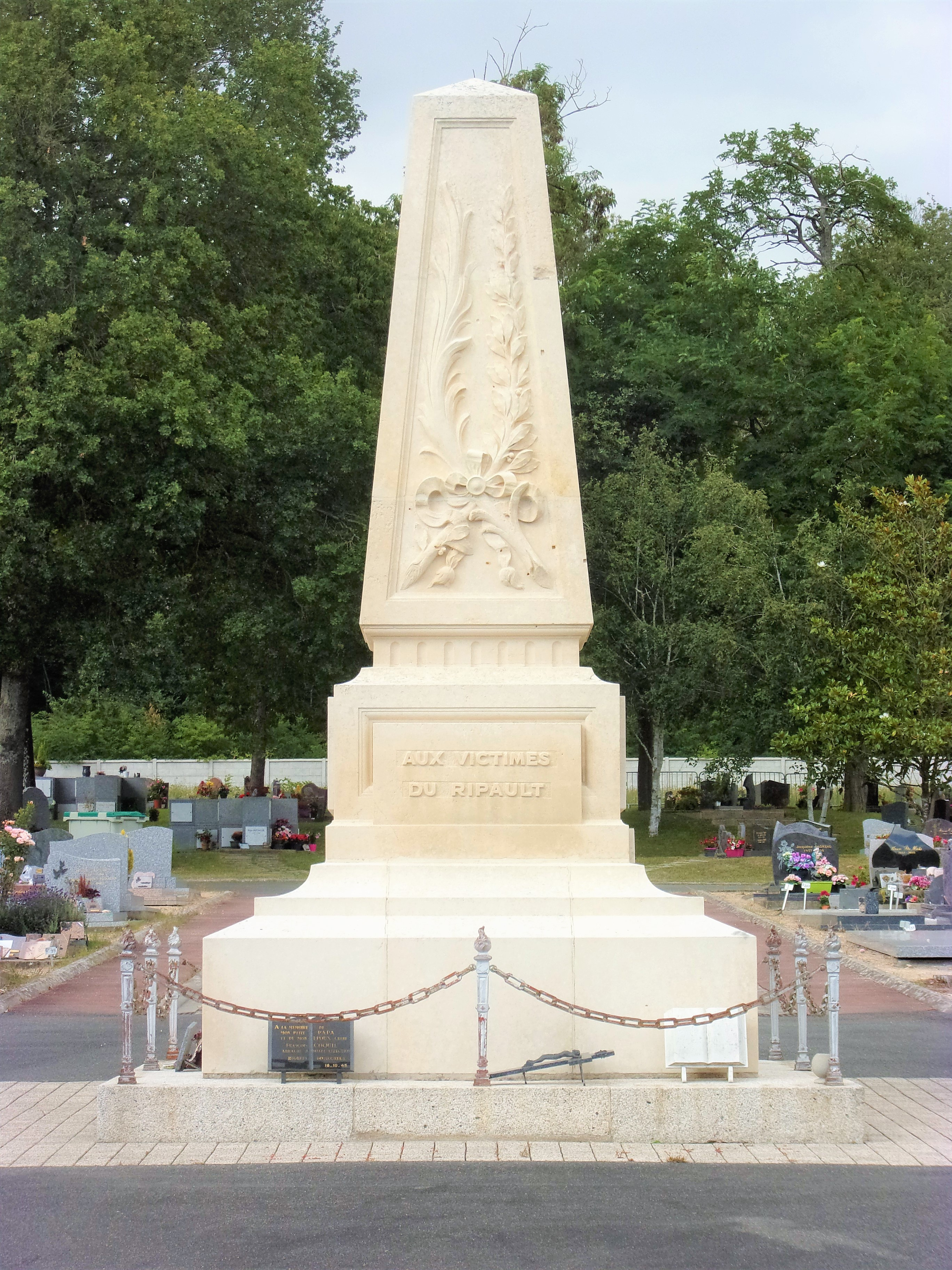
Ripault war memorial at Monts cemetery.

Total destruction zone of the explosion.

Explosion noise perception zone.

On October 18, 1943, at 11:03 a.m., an explosion occurred, resulting in 55 documented fatalities and 19 cases of individuals going missing. However, the number of victims may have reached one hundred, as the Germans never published a figure for the number of casualties among their ranks, and people who later died from injuries sustained at the site were not accounted for. The French youth work brigades were dispatched to the Ripault site that morning to assist in the cleanup of the damaged cannon powder workshops. The initial report indicated that two youths had perished in the blast. However, subsequent investigations revealed that the actual death toll had risen to seven. In addition to the fatalities, the explosion resulted in 345 injuries, 145 of which were classified as serious. The majority of fatalities and injuries were a result of burns or the blast's shockwave. The detonation of a convoy undergoing unloading resulted in the formation of a crater 15 meters in depth and led to the destruction of a considerable portion of the facilities, with 21 workshops being reduced to rubble in successive explosions. All residential structures within the hamlet of Vontes, situated near the southern entrance of the powder factory, were destroyed. All edifices situated within a radius of 155 meters from the initial explosion point were also obliterated.

The effects were observed as far as Tours, 10 kilometers away, where shop windows were shattered, and part of a church vault collapsed. However, the explosion's shockwave did not reach the nearby town of Monts, which was effectively shielded by the 20-meter-high embankment of the Paris-Bordeaux railway line. It is conceivable that the minimal cloud cover on that day augmented the ground effects by constraining the dispersion of the shockwave at altitude. The detonations were audible within a 50-kilometer radius, reaching Château-Renault, Châtellerault, and Montrésor.

The estimated damage to the powder factory was 200 million old francs (equivalent to 46 million euros in 2017), while the estimated damage to private buildings, primarily residential properties, situated outside the powder factory was 10 million francs (equivalent to 2.3 million euros in 2017). (Note: Guénand 2007, p. 257)

A monument was erected in the Monts cemetery to commemorate all victims of Ripault accidents. A memorial ceremony is held annually on October 18 at the monument.

==== Causes of the disaster ====
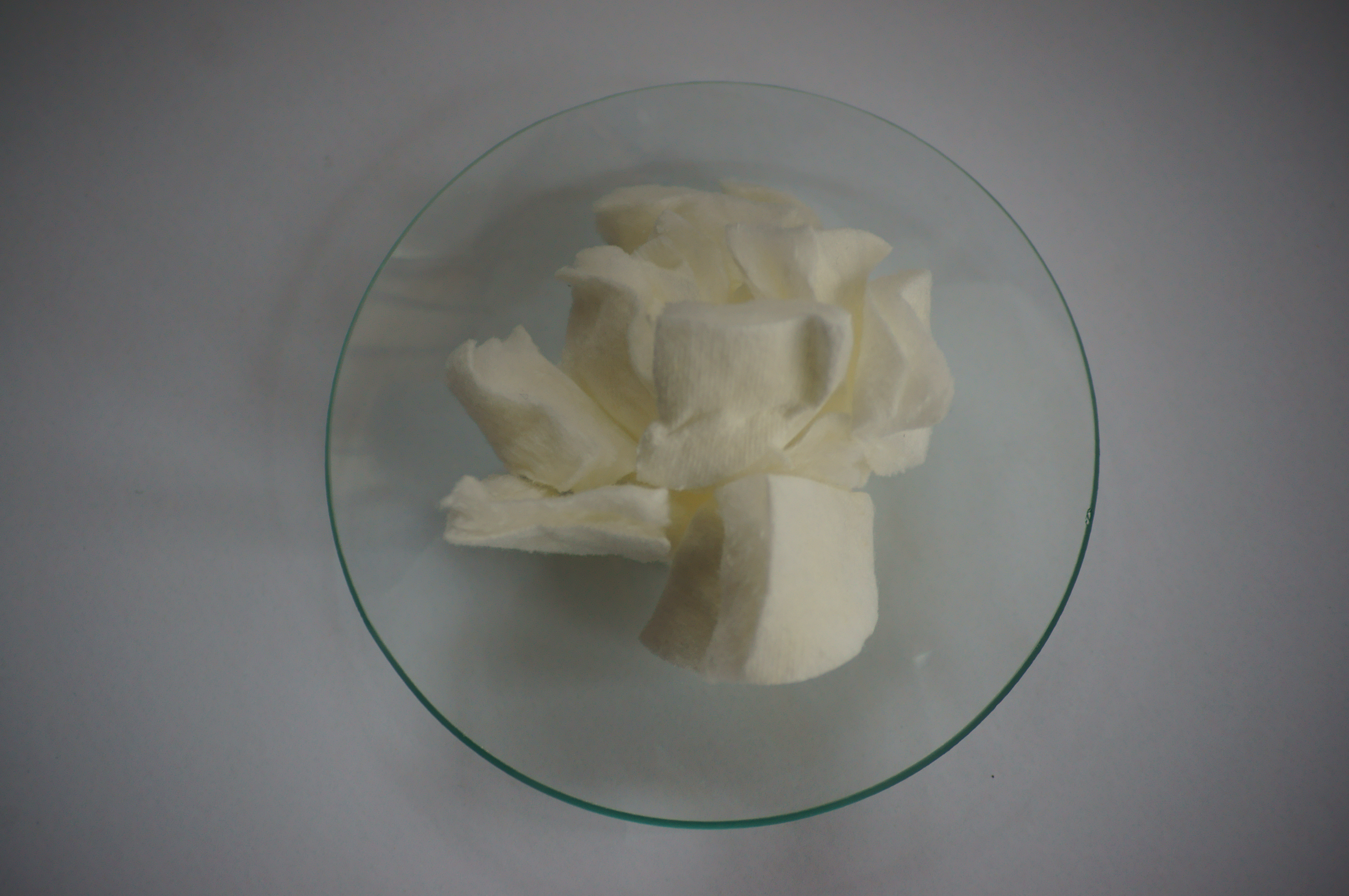
Nitrocellulose sample.

The French newspaper La Dépêche du Centre, which was subject to rigorous oversight by the German occupation authorities, (Note: The owners of La Dépêche du Centre were imposed with an administrator and editor by the Germans to monitor the content of the newspaper's articles.) did not disclose the precise location of the explosion in its edition of October 19, 1943. However, the news had already been disseminated through word of mouth among the population of Tours, who also observed the plume of smoke rising from the horizon. A rumor suggested sabotage, which was false information that Radio London was quick to exploit. The explosion was accidental and resulted from a series of negligent and inappropriate decisions. Moreover, an earlier accidental explosion had occurred on September 3, which killed three people, indicating a laxity in following safety instructions at the powder factory. (Note: Guénand 2007, p. 249)

By mid-October, Ripault had exhausted its supply of nitrocellulose, the essential raw material for producing B powder. A stock manufactured in 1940 was transported by rail from the Saint-Médard-en-Jalles powder factory (19 wagons in three shipments, totaling 240 tons of nitrocellulose) to Ripault. On Friday, October 15, while the wagons were situated at the factory near its southern entrance on the Montbazon road, analyses were conducted which revealed that the moisture content of the nitrocellulose was only 5%, a figure which fell short of the 25% required to limit the risk of explosion. Additionally, some partially damaged wooden crates were leaking a portion of their 150 kg of nitrocellulose. It was inappropriate to ship the explosive under these conditions, and the regional prefect requested that the Minister of Industrial Production impose sanctions on the director of the Saint-Médard powder factory. (Note: Guénand 2007, pp. 257–258) The workers declined to unload the train due to the highly flammable nature of the overly dry nitrocellulose. However, the workers were compelled to resume work on Monday, October 18, despite the lack of additional safety measures, due to the SNCF's desire to reclaim its wagons as soon as possible. The identity of the individual who issued the order remains uncertain. The precise cause of the catastrophe remains uncertain. However, it is plausible that a spark generated by the friction of a wheel on the rail may have ignited the overly dry nitrocellulose that had fallen from a defective crate. (Note: Guénand 2007, p. 256) This hypothesis, however, cannot be substantiated due to the absence of nearby witnesses who survived the incident, the unavailability of the bodies of the victims in the unloading area, and the destruction of any potential material evidence by the explosion's intensity. The Lande camp was utilized as a temporary residence for approximately a hundred displaced individuals. (Note: Guénand 2007, p. 255)

The disaster had a profound impact on urban planning in the Ripault area. In 1947, following the conclusion of the war, the inaugural safety measure adopted in Monts to mitigate the potential consequences of a similar incident was the establishment of a buffer zone, wherein the construction of residential properties was prohibited in the vicinity of the powder factory. (Note: Guénand 2007, p. 259)

=== Temporary resumption and diversification ===
==== Decline in powder activity ====
The facilities were only restored in 1945, in the western part of the site, which had suffered the least damage from the explosion. With the conclusion of the conflict and the subsequent decline in demand for powder, the traditional activities of the powder factory underwent a gradual decline. Furthermore, the equipment and materials were outdated, with some components exceeding 30 years of age. (Note: Guénand 2007, p. 267) The factory was utilized for the processing of damaged American munitions, the manufacture of war powder, and, from 1946 onwards, the production of hunting powder. In 1952, Ripault ceased the production of military powders destined for delivery to the United States on behalf of NATO. (Note: Guénand 2007, p. 279) From 1953 to 1957, the primary activity was the recovery of tolite from decommissioned munitions.

==== Attempts at diversification ====
To retain the services of the powder factory personnel, whose positions were vulnerable due to the reduction in traditional operations, a diverse array of novel trades was introduced at Ripault. In 1946, a biochemical research department was established. (Note: In the immediate post-war period, France sought to reduce its dependency on the United States for its antibiotic supply. The Pasteur Institute and military pharmacists requested assistance from the army's powder service for these scientific studies.) A portion of the facility was temporarily dedicated to the production of antibiotics, including penicillin and tyrothricin, for which Roger Bellon was consulted. The production of antibiotics, which employed approximately 200 individuals, (Note: Guénand 2007, p. 264) was found to be unprofitable and ceased in 1948. (Note: Guénand 2007, p. 270) In 1950, the Court of Auditors determined that this commercial activity was incompatible with the powder factory's status, resulting in the transfer of production to Roger Bellon's laboratory, which had previously served as a subcontractor. Subsequently, Roger Bellon Laboratories constructed an additional 6,000 m² of facilities, which commenced operations in 1951. In 1957, the factory expanded on the other side of the D17, at the "La Gargouserie" site. This technological transition became a permanent feature of Ripault, where the pharmaceutical industry has remained ever since.

In addition to its primary production, the powder factory also manufactured specific Peintures Valentine to offset the damage caused to the Gennevilliers facility during wartime. It also engaged in furniture production, including children's beds, while other sections of the Ripault site and the Sillars storage facility were utilized for agricultural purposes. However, these latter endeavors, which were also unprofitable, were terminated by 1950. (Note: Guénand 2007, p. 265)

=== Commissariat à l'énergie atomique (CEA) and private companies ===
==== Takeover by the CEA ====
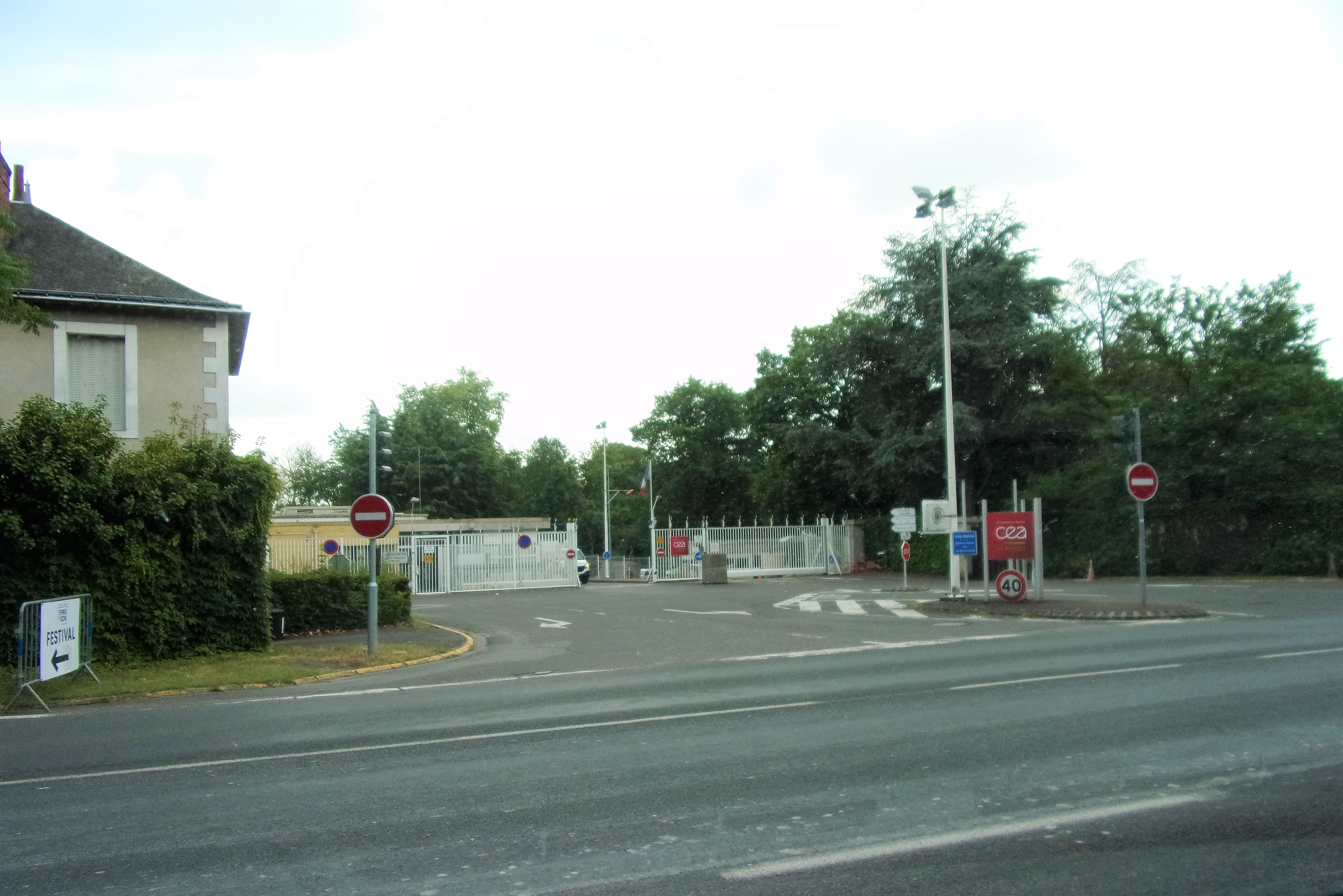
Entrance to CEA du Ripault.

In 1959, Pierre Guillaumat, Minister of Armies, announced the definitive cessation of activity at the Ripault powder plant as part of a national reorganization plan, with production transferred to Pont-de-Buis-lès-Quimerch. This announcement prompted a strike among the workers. In 1961, the site was taken over by the CEA for the Directorate of Military Applications (DAM), resulting in the reassignment of forty workers, as announced by Prime Minister Michel Debré. The Ripault facility commenced work on developing firing mechanisms for French nuclear ballistic missiles and conducted research in the field of fuel cells. A portion of the buildings situated to the south of the site were sold to the pharmaceutical company Roger Bellon Laboratories, which later expanded its workforce to 580 employees by the 1970s. Some workers were temporarily housed at the Lande camp until its destruction in 1970. Other buildings were allocated to Graphoplex, a manufacturer of calculating machines, which in 1973 centralized its production in Monts. Consequently, the Ripault Center relinquished all the land comprising the former powder plant located south of the D17 road. Even after the CEA takeover, the risk of explosions persisted: two workers were killed on December 9, 1963, and another died on June 7, 2005.

In the 21st century, the Ripault CEA center is engaged in the design and manufacture of new materials, as well as the investigation of alternative energy sources. The center is also home to an annex, an experimental site at the Ruchard camp.

In 2015, the Ripault employed approximately 540 permanent staff members, not including subcontractors, representing a substantial proportion of the 2,397 jobs available in Monts during that same year. Despite the center's initial threat of closure until autumn 2017, confirmation was received the following year that it would continue operations, with over 500 jobs maintained until at least 2025. Ripault's activities are expected to diversify, particularly in the area of civilian applications of fuel cells.

==== Development of an industrial zone ====
Two pharmaceutical laboratories were established to the south of the site, on either side of the D17 road. One of them, Recipharm AB, is the successor to Roger Bellon Laboratories after successive mergers and acquisitions. The Pinsonnière industrial park, occupying part of the land previously used by the powder plant before its closure (such as the Gargouserie), but extending beyond, covers eight hectares and is home to sixteen companies employing approximately eighty individuals in 2018.

==== The Ripault, natural and technological risks, and safety measures ====
The presence of the CEA unit, which is not subject to the Seveso Directive, does not necessitate the implementation of a technological risk prevention plan for Monts and the neighboring towns (Artannes-sur-Indre, Joué-lès-Tours, Montbazon, Sorigny, Thilouze, and Veigné). Nevertheless, the general regulations about the transportation of hazardous materials remain in force. The local urban plan for Monts stipulates that, in the buildable areas near the Ripault (sector UB5 and attached sub-sectors), the construction of buildings and facilities for gatherings of people, as well as high-rise or curtain-wall buildings, is explicitly prohibited. The Ripault site, situated on the Indre River, is susceptible to flooding. The Indre Valley flood risk prevention plan entrusts the CEA with the responsibility of implementing the requisite measures to avert the impact of severe flooding on the "safety of property and people."

For reasons of internal security, the Ripault site is not accessible to the general public. Furthermore, it is subject to a no-fly zone for any aircraft flying below an altitude of 3,500 feet, except for those falling within the exceptions listed in a ministerial decree.

==== A memorial site closed to the public ====
In 1966, the Ripault powder plant museum was inaugurated as a result of the initiative of Jean Guéraud, a former resident of the area who had survived the 1943 explosion. The museum was established within a former 19th-century mill, with the millstone itself being preserved. Two mannequins are on display, depicting a couple of workers dressed in the uniforms that were mandatory at the time. Additionally, tools and photographic documents are exhibited. However, due to security concerns and the museum's location within the CEA grounds, it is not accessible to the general public.

Key dates in the history of the Poudrerie Nationale du Ripault, from its foundation to its transfer to the CEA

■ History of France and Touraine - ■ History of the powder factory - ■ Accident, explosion - ■ Before and after the powder factory

== See also ==
- Manufacture Nationale d'Armes de Tulle

== Bibliography ==
- Cettour-Baron, Gérard (2015). Esvres 1940-1945, les Esvriens, la ligne de démarcation et le STO (in French). Jason éditions.
- Féneant, Jacques (1985). "Du côté d'hier : la poudrerie du Ripault". Le Magazine de la Touraine (in French) (15): 17–28.
- Guénand, Agathe (1998). La fabrique des poudres et salpêtres du Ripault 1786-1817 (in French). Tours: Université François-Rabelais.
- Guénand, Agathe (2007). Le Ripault et les explosifs, 176 années d'histoires poudrières au bord de l'Indre (in French). Saint-Syr-sur-Loire: Alan Sutton. ISBN 978-2-84910-288-6.
- Guéraud, Jean. 18 octobre 1943 : la tragique explosion de la poudrerie nationale du Ripault (in French). Chambray-les-Tours: Vaillant.
- Guéraud, Jean (2001). "La tréfilerie royale du Ripault à Monts". Le Val de l'Indre (in French) (13): 15–24.
- Maurice, Jacques (1968). Monts et son passé : synthèse historique (in French). Joué-lès-Tours: Self-publishing.
- Penet, Gabriel-Henri (1997). "Les moulins du Ripault sur l'Indre". Bulletin des amis des moulins de Touraine (in French) (26): 5–9.
- Turgan, Julien (1878). "Chapitre 191 - Poudrerie du Ripault (Indre-et-Loire)". Les grandes usines de France (in French). Vol. X. ISSN 1257-6999.
- Vannetzel, Henri (2001). "Histoire résumée de la Poudrerie du Ripault" (PDF). La Lettre du patrimoine poudrier et pyrotechnique (in French) (12). Archived from the original (PDF) on June 13, 2018.
