= Noi vogliam Dio, Vergine Maria =

Catholic hymn

"Noi vogliam Dio, Vergin Maria" is a Marian hymn from the Italian folk tradition. It is a translation of the French hymn "Nous voulons Dieu", written and composed for a pilgrimage to Lourdes on 11 September 1882 by François-Xavier Moreau, parish priest of Sorigny. Both music and lyrics were published into a booklet whose fourth edition was issued in 1885.

== Usage ==
The melody later became well known as a liturgical melody after it lost its civil and religious significance and remains a song with strong lines to the Pope and his period as a secular ruler.

It is often misreported as being the first national anthem for the Papal States, which is anachronistic considering how it was composed 12 years after the Capture of Rome. The film Il Marchese del Grillo, set in papaline Rome, is an example.

During the Italian Resistance a satirical irreverent parody was sung by the Garibaldi Brigades, of communist orientation. It is reported being popular among formation operating around Piacenza and Novara.

To these days, is still used as a liturgical chant, especially in processions.

== Lyrics ==
Noi vogliam Dio, Vergin Maria,
benigna ascolta il nostro dir,
noi t'invochiamo, o Madre pia,
dei figli tuoi compi il desir.

Chorus: Deh! benedici, o Madre, al grido della fé,
𝄆 noi vogliam Dio, ch'è nostro Padre,
noi vogliam Dio, ch'è nostro Re. 𝄇

Noi vogliam Dio nelle famiglie
dei nostri cari in mezzo al cor;
sian puri i figli, caste le figlie,
tutti c'infiammi di Dio l'amor.
Chorus

Noi vogliam Dio in ogni scuola
perché la cara gioventù
la legge apprenda e la parola
della sapienza di Gesù.
Chorus

Noi vogliam Dio nell'officina
perché sia santo anche il lavor;
a Lui dal campo la fronte china
alzi fidente l'agricoltor.
Chorus

Noi vogliam Dio nella coscienza
di chi l'Italia governerà!
Così la patria riavrà potenza
e a nuova vita risorgerà.
Chorus

Noi vogliam Dio, dell'alma è il grido,
che a piè leviamo del santo altar.
Grido d'amore ardente e fido,
per tua man possa al ciel volar.
Chorus

Noi vogliam Dio, l'inique genti
contro di lui si sollevar.
E negli eccessi loro furenti
osaron stolti Iddio sfidar.
Chorus

Noi vogliam Dio, Dio nella scuola,
vogliam che in essa la gioventù
studi la santa di lui la Parola,
miri l' immagine del buon Gesù.
Chorus

Noi vogliam Dio, nel giudicare
a Dio s'ispiri il tribunal.
Dio nelle nozze innanzi all'altare,
Dio del morente al capezzal.
Chorus

Noi vogliam Dio, perché al soldato
coraggio infonda nel guerreggiar,
sì che a difesa del suo amato
d' Italia sappia da eroe pugnar.
Chorus

Noi vogliam Dio, quest' almo grido
echeggi ovunque in terra e in mar,
suoni solenne in ogni lido,
dove s' innalza di Dio l' altar.
Chorus

Noi vogliam Dio, le inique genti
rigettan stolte il suo regnar,
ma noi un patto stringiam fidenti,
ne fia chi osi più Iddio sfidar.
Chorus

Noi vogliam Dio, nei tribunali
egli presieda al giudicar.
Noi lo vogliamo negli sponsali,
nostro conforto allo spirar.
Chorus

== Latin lyrics ==
Latin text of the hymn written by Mattia Spaggiari:

Deum optamus, Virgo Maria,
prӕbeas aures fidelibus;
ad te clamamus, o Mater pia,
satisfac tuis filiolis!

Chorus: Benedic eia, Mater,
Clamori fidei!
Deum optamus qui nobis Pater,
Deum optamus qui nobis Rex!

Deum optamus, custos familiӕ
In dilectorum sit cordibus;
Filii fortes castӕ sint filiӕ,
Nos amor Dei exardeat.
Chorus

Deum optamus in scholis esse
Ubi iuventus eruditur;
Adsit imago radicis Iesse
Et Verbum Eius hic resonet!
Chorus

Deum optamus ut operarum
Laborem sanctum efficiat;
Erigat frontem sulcis glebarum
Confidens tandem agricola!
Chorus

Deum optamus prӕesse amori,
Prӕesse legi et scientiӕ,
Sicut et regno litibus fori
Et sicut morti natalibus!
Chorus

Deum optamus ut Veritate
Depascat gentes Ecclesia;
Demum devicta iniquitate,
Triumphum agat sic Caritas!
Chorus

Deum optamus, sed Regnum Dei
Recusat mundi stultitia;
Itaque contra perniciei
Fœdus inimus signiferos.
Chorus

Deum optamus, sic ad altare
Tollunt clamores piӕ animӕ;
Hӕ voces sanctӕ, fervidӕ et carӕ
Usque in Excelsos perveniant!
Chorus

Deum optamus, fideliores
Et mente et corde manebimus;
Maximum nobis inter honores
Eius sit sanctum servitium!
Chorus

Fratres, unanimi fœdus antiquum
Virginis magnӕ et patriӕ
Nunc renovemus contra inimicum:
Deum optamus, sic Deus vult!
Chorus

== English lyrics ==
There is no commonly known English translation of the lyrics, however the tune is used for an unrelated English hymn, We Stand for God.

We stand for God and for His glory,
the Lord supreme and God of all,
Against His foes, we raise His standard,
around the Cross, we hear His call.
the Lord supreme and God of all,
Against His foes, we raise His standard,
around the Cross, we hear His call.

Chorus: Strengthen our faith, Redeemer
Guard us when danger is nigh,
𝄆 To Thee we pledge our lives and service,
Strong in a trust that never shall die. 𝄇

We stand for God! Let us be loyal,
our love proclaimed with every breath;
To Christ the King and Lord of lords,
we will be faithful unto death.
