= Saint-Christophe-sur-le-Nais =

- Commune
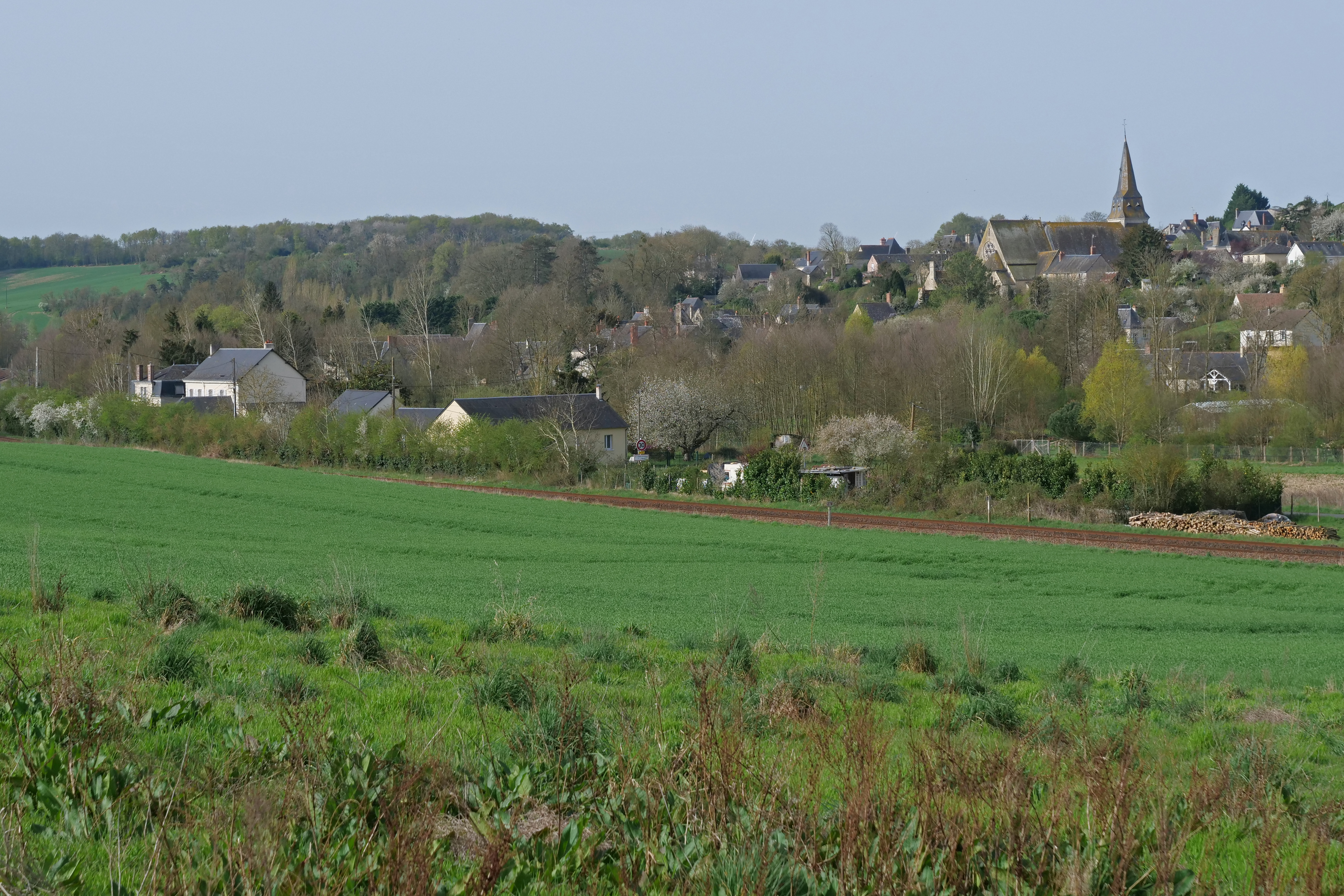
- View of Saint-Christophe-sur-le-Nais

- Coat of arms
- Location of Saint-Christophe-sur-le-Nais
- Location within France Location within Centre-Val de Loire
- Coordinates: 47°37′01″N 0°28′36″E
- Country: France
- Region: Centre-Val de Loire
- Department: Indre-et-Loire
- Arrondissement: Chinon
- Canton: Château-Renault

Government
  - Mayor (2020–2026): Catherine Lemaire
- Area^{1}: 18.27 km^{2} (7.05 sq mi)
- Highest elevation: 127 m (417 ft)
- Lowest elevation: 52 m (171 ft)
- Population (2023): 1,067
  - Density: 58.40/km^{2} (151.3/sq mi)
- Time zone: UTC+01:00 (CET)
  - Summer (DST): UTC+02:00 (CEST)
- INSEE/Postal code: 37213 /37370
- ^{1} French Land Register data, which excludes lakes, ponds, glaciers > 1 km^{2} (0.386 sq mi or 247 acres) and river estuaries.

Saint-Christophe-sur-le-Nais (French pronunciation: [sɛ̃ kʁistɔf syʁ lə nɛ]) is a commune in the Indre-et-Loire department in central France. It is situated on the border of the department of Sarthe, 30 km (19 mi) northwest of Tours.

== Geography ==
The railway linking Caen, Le Mans and Tours ensures a regular traffic for goods and passengers at the Saint-Paterne-Racan station located 2 km (1.2 mi) SE. There are daily buses to Tours. The river Escotais is full of fish and attracts many fishermen. The commune is 18.27 km^{2} (7.05 sq mi), 1.33 km^{2} (0.51 sq mi) are meadows, 16 km^{2} (6.2 sq mi) are farmlands including 14.09 km^{2} (5.44 sq mi) arable lands and 0.7 km^{2} (0.27 sq mi) of orchards are found.

== History ==
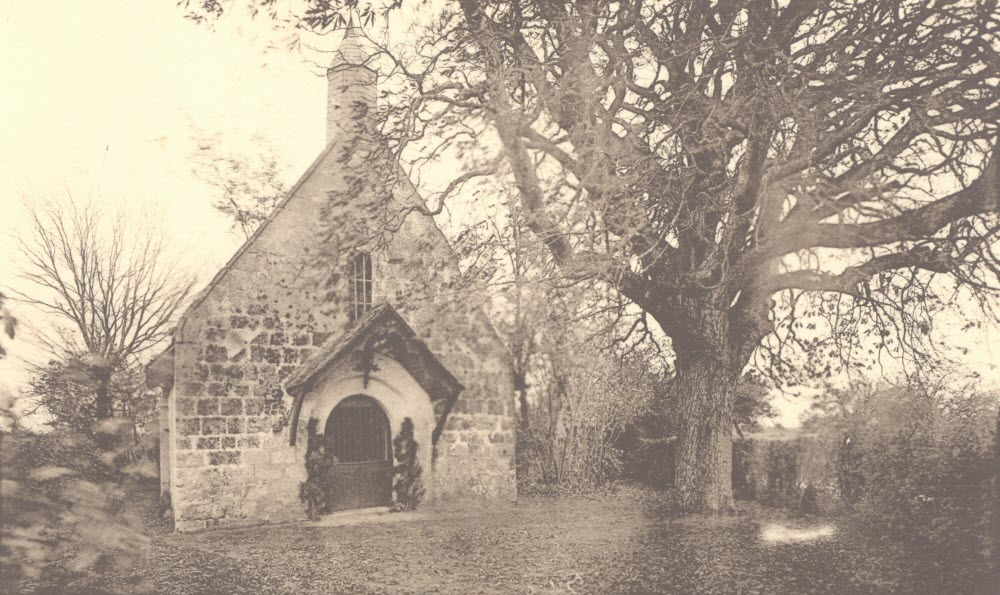
Chapelle Saint-Gilles

The village was founded around the year 1000. It received fortifications in the 13th century. On the other side of the railway, the agglomerated part, Le Faubourg de Vienne had workmen of flourishing industries of the commune. Saint-Christophe-sur-le-Nais includes the presence of many underground cavities, many slopes that used to be covered with vines add the undeniable charm to the village.

== Population ==
Historical population
Year	Pop.	±% p.a.
1968	1,022	—
1975	932	−1.31%
1982	877	−0.87%
1990	925	+0.67%
1999	965	+0.47%
2007	1,124	+1.92%
2012	1,080	−0.80%
2017	1,127	+0.86%
2023	1,067	−0.91%
Source: INSEE

== Employment ==
The commune's unemployment rate is 9.5% as of 2020.

== See also ==
- Communes of the Indre-et-Loire department
