= Canton of Monts =

Coordinates: 47.28°N 0.63°E

The canton of Monts is an administrative division of the Indre-et-Loire department, central France. It was created at the French canton reorganisation which came into effect in March 2015. Its seat is in Monts.

It consists of the following communes:

1. Artannes-sur-Indre
2. Esvres
3. Montbazon
4. Monts
5. Pont-de-Ruan
6. Saint-Branchs
7. Sorigny
8. Truyes
9. Veigné
10. Villeperdue
