= Manufacture Nationale d'Armes de Tulle =

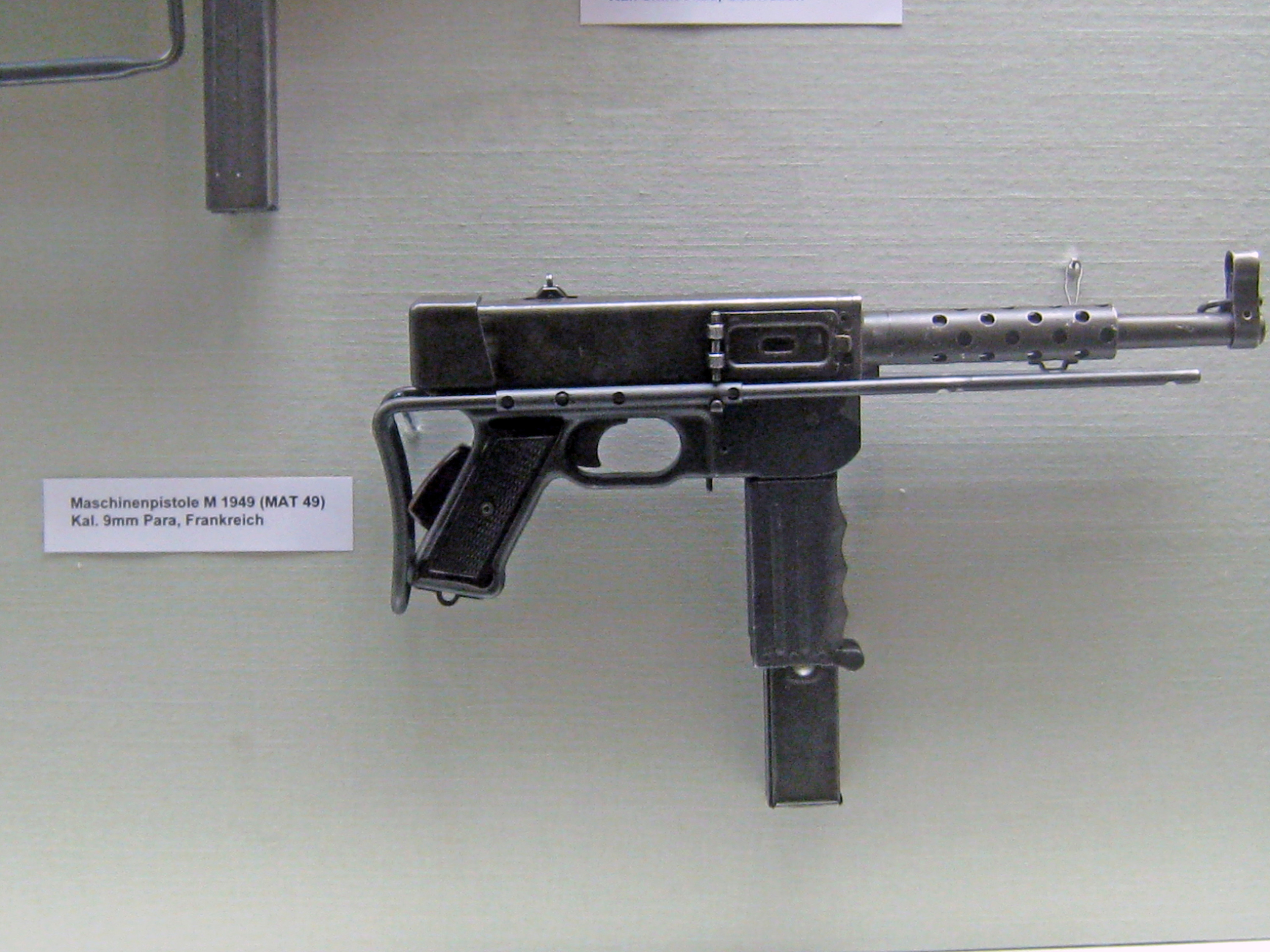
Submachine gun MAT 49

The Manufacture Nationale d’Armes de Tulle, often abbreviated to MAT ("Tulle National Weapons Factory" in English) was a French state-owned weapons manufacturer in the town of Tulle, Corrèze. Founded in 1690, it was absorbed into the French state-owned defense conglomerate GIAT Industries in the 1980s.

== History ==
The company was founded in 1690 and was given the status of a royal arms factory in 1777. It was established as a state-owned enterprise from 1886.

Tulle was one of the most important weapons manufacturers in France, producing, among others, the Chassepot, Lebel, Berthier and RSC M1917 rifles.

Until World War I mainly small-caliber weapons were produced, particularly machine guns. Tulle started intensive production of heavy equipment during the First World War. After the war, intensive efforts were made to develop automatic weapons.

During World War II the company produced weapons for the German occupying power, but was also a haven of resistance. The factory location played a part in the Tulle massacre by the 2nd SS Panzer Division Das Reich in June 1944. After the Allied landings in Normandy, all production was moved to Epernay.

After Tulle was liberated, production resumed at the original facility. After the war, it specialized in light and medium-caliber automatic weapons. The MAT-49 submachine gun was developed at Tulle.

MAT remained the most important employer in the Limousin region (now merged into Nouvelle-Aquitaine) until the 1980s. The company was integrated into the newly-founded GIAT Industries (now Nexter Group) as part of the rationalization of the French arms industry and restructured several times. A subsidiary (Nexter Mechanics) continues to produce mechanical and hydraulic components for weapon systems at the Tulle location, but increasingly also for civil applications.

There has also been a weapons museum at the site since 1999.

== See also ==
- Manufacture d'armes de Châtellerault
- Manufacture d'armes de Saint-Étienne
- National Powder Factory of Ripault

== Sources ==
- Cayre, Yves. Histoire de la Manufacture d’armes de Tulle de 1690 à 1970, MAT, Tulle, 1973.
