= Esvres =

Esvres-sur-Indre
- Commune
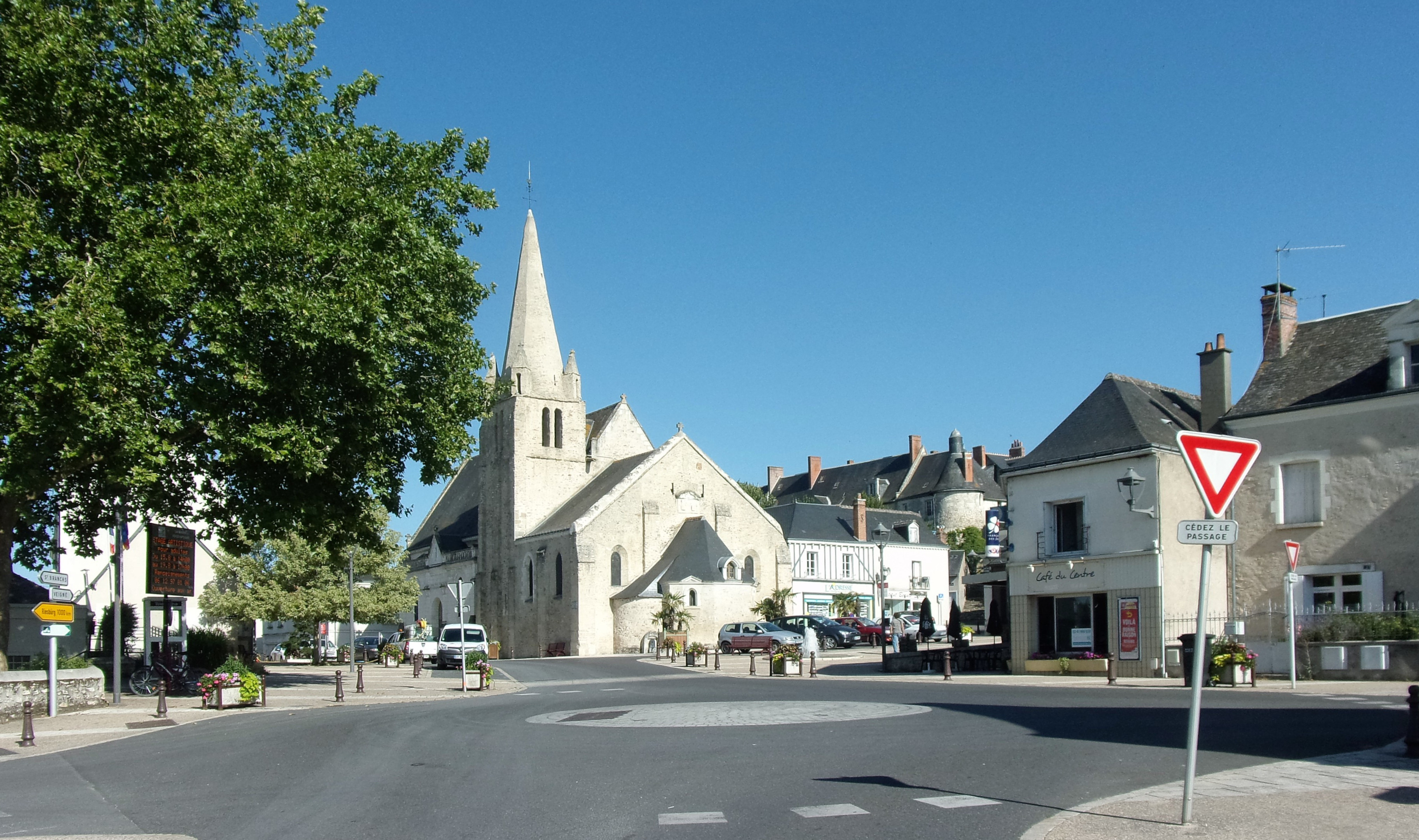

- Coat of arms
- Location of Esvres-sur-Indre
- Location within France Location within Centre-Val de Loire
- Coordinates: 47°17′06″N 0°47′13″E
- Country: France
- Region: Centre-Val de Loire
- Department: Indre-et-Loire
- Arrondissement: Tours
- Canton: Monts
- Intercommunality: Communauté de communes Touraine Vallée de l'Indre

Government
  - Mayor (2020–2026): Jean-Christophe Gassot
- Area^{1}: 35.85 km^{2} (13.84 sq mi)
- Highest elevation: 96 m (315 ft)
- Lowest elevation: 52 m (171 ft)
- Population (2023): 6,294
  - Density: 175.6/km^{2} (454.7/sq mi)
- Time zone: UTC+01:00 (CET)
  - Summer (DST): UTC+02:00 (CEST)
- INSEE/Postal code: 37104 /37320
- ^{1} French Land Register data, which excludes lakes, ponds, glaciers > 1 km^{2} (0.386 sq mi or 247 acres) and river estuaries.

Esvres (French pronunciation: [ɛvʁ]), also called Esvres-sur-Indre, is a commune in the department of Indre-et-Loire, in the administrative region of Centre-Val de Loire in central France.

== Population ==
Historical population

Year	Pop.	±% p.a.
1793	1,588	—
1800	1,588	+0.00%
1806	1,779	+1.91%
1821	1,751	−0.11%
1831	1,739	−0.07%
1836	1,801	+0.70%
1841	1,820	+0.21%
1846	1,818	−0.02%
1851	1,833	+0.16%
1856	1,859	+0.28%
1861	1,871	+0.13%
1866	1,813	−0.63%
1872	1,776	−0.34%
1876	1,867	+1.26%
1881	1,808	−0.64%
1886	1,862	+0.59%
1891	1,770	−1.01%
1896	1,802	+0.36%
1901	1,765	−0.41%

Year	Pop.	±% p.a.
1906	1,681	−0.97%
1911	1,637	−0.53%
1921	1,625	−0.07%
1926	1,543	−1.03%
1931	1,661	+1.48%
1936	1,681	+0.24%
1946	1,765	+0.49%
1954	1,955	+1.29%
1962	2,081	+0.78%
1968	2,473	+2.92%
1975	3,050	+3.04%
1982	4,160	+4.53%
1990	4,234	+0.22%
1999	4,278	+0.11%
2007	4,401	+0.35%
2012	4,922	+2.26%
2017	6,010	+4.08%
2023	6,294	+0.77%

Source: EHESS and INSEE (1968-2023)

== Geography ==
=== Location and Neighboring Communes ===
Esvres is a commune in the Indre valley, the commune center being located at the confluence of the Échandon, one of its tributaries. It is situated about 14.3 kilometers southeast of Tours as the crow flies.

== See also ==
- Communes of the Indre-et-Loire department
