= Saint-Branchs =

- Commune
- Location of Saint-Branchs
- Location within France Location within Centre-Val de Loire
- Coordinates: 47°13′40″N 0°46′23″E
- Country: France
- Region: Centre-Val de Loire
- Department: Indre-et-Loire
- Arrondissement: Tours
- Canton: Monts

Government
  - Mayor (2020–2026): Patrick Nathié
- Area^{1}: 51.16 km^{2} (19.75 sq mi)
- Highest elevation: 125 m (410 ft)
- Lowest elevation: 62 m (203 ft)
- Population (2023): 2,637
  - Density: 51.54/km^{2} (133.5/sq mi)
- Time zone: UTC+01:00 (CET)
  - Summer (DST): UTC+02:00 (CEST)
- INSEE/Postal code: 37211 /37320
- ^{1} French Land Register data, which excludes lakes, ponds, glaciers > 1 km^{2} (0.386 sq mi or 247 acres) and river estuaries.

Saint-Branchs (French pronunciation: [sɛ̃ bʁɑ̃]) is a commune in the Indre-et-Loire department in central France.

== Population ==
Historical population

Year	Pop.	±% p.a.
1793	1,361	—
1800	1,920	+5.04%
1806	1,837	−0.73%
1821	1,936	+0.35%
1831	2,010	+0.38%
1836	2,043	+0.33%
1841	2,003	−0.39%
1846	1,886	−1.20%
1851	1,941	+0.58%
1856	1,931	−0.10%
1861	1,835	−1.01%
1866	1,802	−0.36%
1872	1,780	−0.20%
1876	1,740	−0.57%
1881	1,744	+0.05%
1886	1,747	+0.03%
1891	1,685	−0.72%
1896	1,610	−0.91%
1901	1,612	+0.02%

Year	Pop.	±% p.a.
1906	1,564	−0.60%
1911	1,535	−0.37%
1921	1,428	−0.72%
1926	1,468	+0.55%
1931	1,416	−0.72%
1936	1,433	+0.24%
1946	1,366	−0.48%
1954	1,429	+0.57%
1962	1,361	−0.61%
1968	1,621	+2.96%
1975	1,548	−0.66%
1982	1,707	+1.41%
1990	2,103	+2.64%
1999	2,211	+0.56%
2007	2,340	+0.71%
2012	2,540	+1.65%
2017	2,607	+0.52%
2023	2,637	+0.19%

Source: EHESS and INSEE (1968-2023)

== See also ==
- Communes of the Indre-et-Loire department
