= Truyes =

- Commune
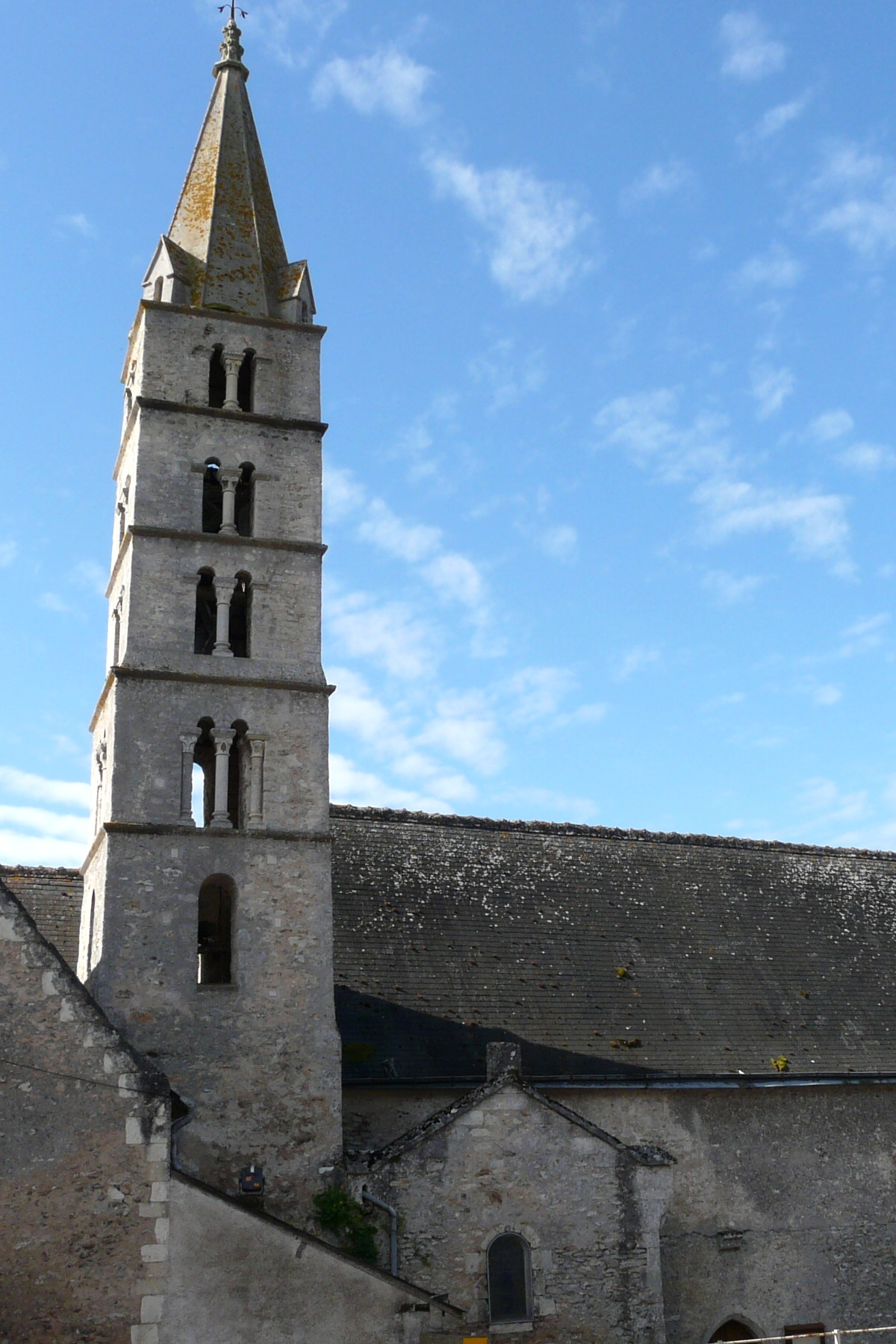
- The church in Truyes

- Coat of arms
- Location of Truyes
- Location within France Location within Centre-Val de Loire
- Coordinates: 47°16′25″N 0°51′03″E
- Country: France
- Region: Centre-Val de Loire
- Department: Indre-et-Loire
- Arrondissement: Tours
- Canton: Monts

Government
  - Mayor (2020–2026): Stéphane de Colbert
- Area^{1}: 16.39 km^{2} (6.33 sq mi)
- Highest elevation: 99 m (325 ft)
- Lowest elevation: 57 m (187 ft)
- Population (2023): 2,442
  - Density: 149.0/km^{2} (385.9/sq mi)
- Time zone: UTC+01:00 (CET)
  - Summer (DST): UTC+02:00 (CEST)
- INSEE/Postal code: 37263 /37320
- ^{1} French Land Register data, which excludes lakes, ponds, glaciers > 1 km^{2} (0.386 sq mi or 247 acres) and river estuaries.

Truyes (French pronunciation: [tʁɥi]) is a commune in the Indre-et-Loire department in central France.

== Population ==
Historical population

| Year | Pop. | ±% p.a. |
|---|---|---|
| 1793 | 542 | — |
| 1800 | 520 | −0.59% |
| 1806 | 435 | −2.93% |
| 1821 | 621 | +2.40% |
| 1831 | 659 | +0.60% |
| 1836 | 647 | −0.37% |
| 1841 | 628 | −0.59% |
| 1846 | 659 | +0.97% |
| 1851 | 632 | −0.83% |
| 1856 | 675 | +1.33% |
| 1861 | 616 | −1.81% |
| 1866 | 647 | +0.99% |
| 1872 | 643 | −0.10% |
| 1876 | 626 | −0.67% |
| 1881 | 617 | −0.29% |
| 1886 | 637 | +0.64% |
| 1891 | 654 | +0.53% |
| 1896 | 645 | −0.28% |
| 1901 | 653 | +0.25% |

| Year | Pop. | ±% p.a. |
|---|---|---|
| 1906 | 633 | −0.62% |
| 1911 | 637 | +0.13% |
| 1921 | 554 | −1.39% |
| 1926 | 540 | −0.51% |
| 1931 | 569 | +1.05% |
| 1936 | 595 | +0.90% |
| 1946 | 554 | −0.71% |
| 1954 | 632 | +1.66% |
| 1962 | 689 | +1.09% |
| 1968 | 781 | +2.11% |
| 1975 | 1,002 | +3.62% |
| 1982 | 1,254 | +3.26% |
| 1990 | 1,588 | +3.00% |
| 1999 | 1,728 | +0.94% |
| 2007 | 2,047 | +2.14% |
| 2012 | 2,111 | +0.62% |
| 2017 | 2,433 | +2.88% |
| 2023 | 2,442 | +0.06% |

Source: EHESS and INSEE (1968–2023)

== See also ==
- Communes of the Indre-et-Loire department
