= Pont-de-Ruan =

- Commune
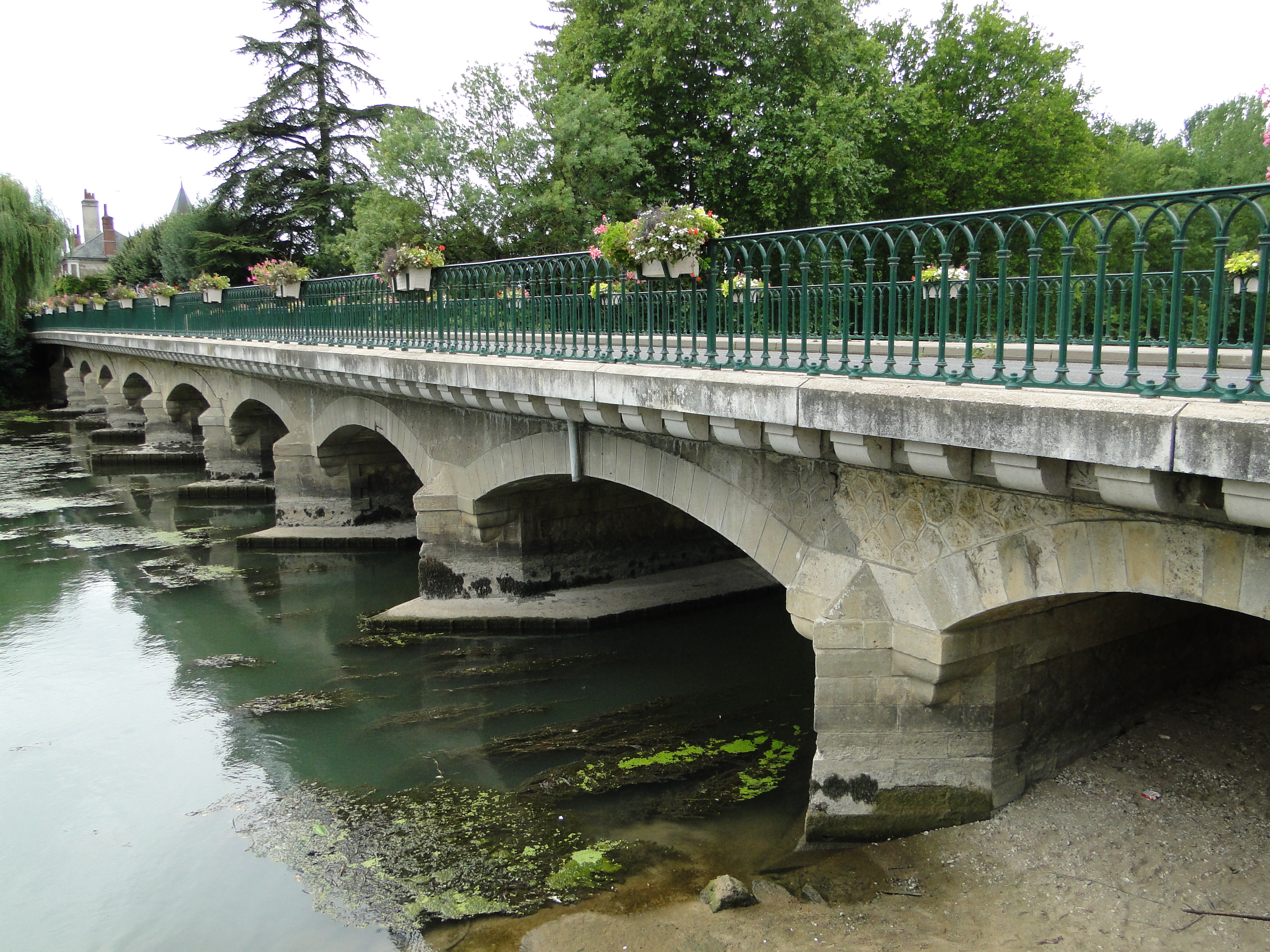
- The bridge in Pont-de-Ruan, crossing the Indre river
- Location of Pont-de-Ruan
- Location within France Location within Centre-Val de Loire
- Coordinates: 47°15′41″N 0°34′36″E
- Country: France
- Region: Centre-Val de Loire
- Department: Indre-et-Loire
- Arrondissement: Tours
- Canton: Monts

Government
  - Mayor (2020–2026): Michelle Duvault
- Area^{1}: 5.74 km^{2} (2.22 sq mi)
- Highest elevation: 94 m (308 ft)
- Lowest elevation: 46 m (151 ft)
- Population (2023): 1,214
  - Density: 211/km^{2} (548/sq mi)
- Time zone: UTC+01:00 (CET)
  - Summer (DST): UTC+02:00 (CEST)
- INSEE/Postal code: 37186 /37260
- ^{1} French Land Register data, which excludes lakes, ponds, glaciers > 1 km^{2} (0.386 sq mi or 247 acres) and river estuaries.

Pont-de-Ruan (French pronunciation: [pɔ̃ də ʁɥɑ̃]) is a commune in the Indre-et-Loire department in central France.

It is known for picturesque water mills and goat cheese, and Balzac champions its beauty in The Lily of the Valley.

== Population ==
Historical population
Year	Pop.	±% p.a.
1968	308	—
1975	425	+4.71%
1982	510	+2.64%
1990	536	+0.62%
1999	593	+1.13%
2007	797	+3.76%
2012	939	+3.33%
2017	1,189	+4.83%
2023	1,214	+0.35%
Source: INSEE

== See also ==
- Communes of the Indre-et-Loire department
