= Villeperdue =

- Commune
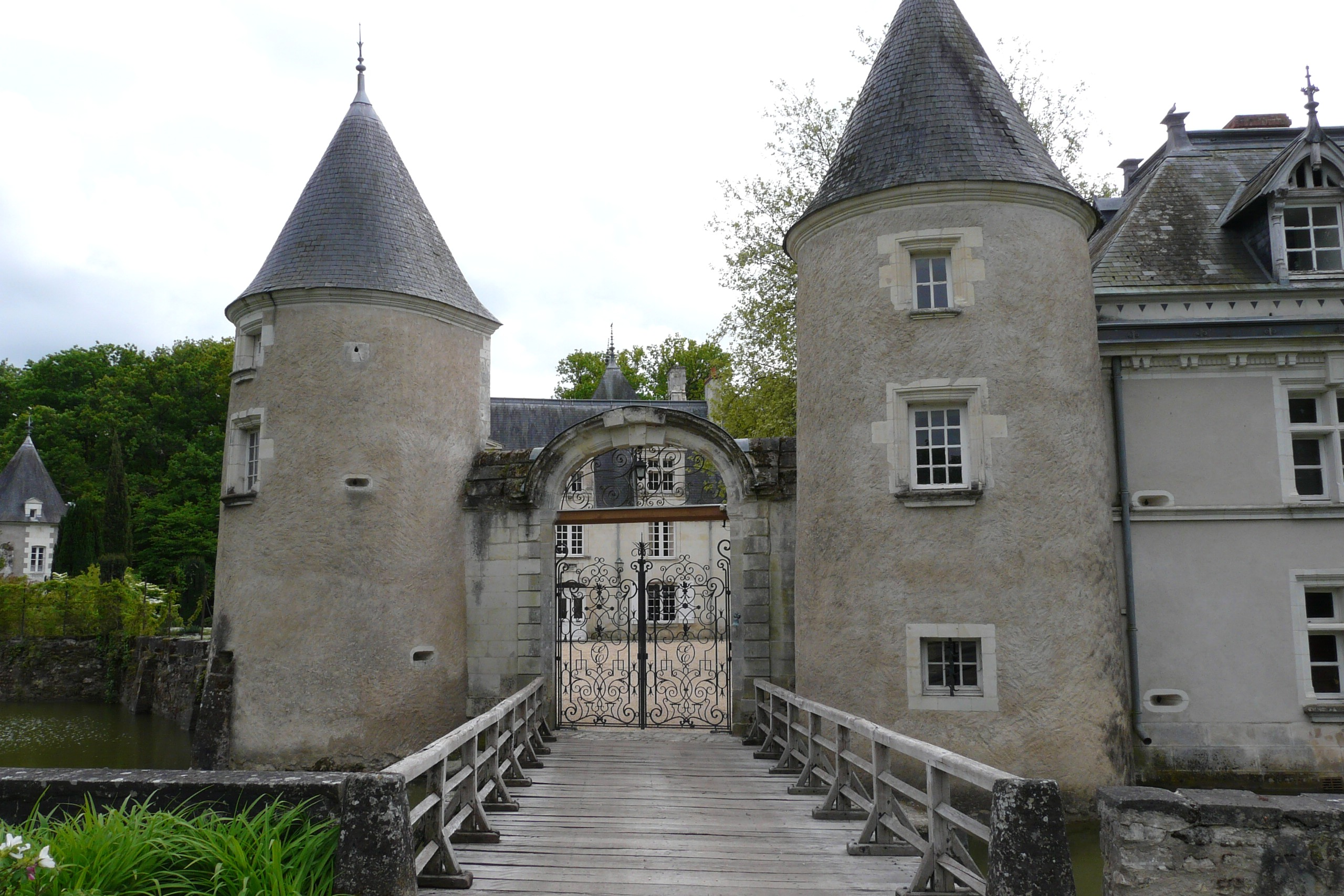
- Chateau of Boisbonnard
- Location of Villeperdue
- Location within France Location within Centre-Val de Loire
- Coordinates: 47°12′06″N 0°37′59″E
- Country: France
- Region: Centre-Val de Loire
- Department: Indre-et-Loire
- Arrondissement: Tours
- Canton: Monts

Government
  - Mayor (2020–2026): Frédéric Dupey
- Area^{1}: 11.95 km^{2} (4.61 sq mi)
- Highest elevation: 118 m (387 ft)
- Lowest elevation: 93 m (305 ft)
- Population (2023): 1,126
  - Density: 94.23/km^{2} (244.0/sq mi)
- Time zone: UTC+01:00 (CET)
  - Summer (DST): UTC+02:00 (CEST)
- INSEE/Postal code: 37278 /37260
- ^{1} French Land Register data, which excludes lakes, ponds, glaciers > 1 km^{2} (0.386 sq mi or 247 acres) and river estuaries.

Villeperdue (French pronunciation: [vilpɛʁdy]) is a commune in the Indre-et-Loire department in central France. The Château de Boisbonnard is located in the commune.

== Population ==
Historical population
Year	Pop.	±% p.a.
1968	641	—
1975	605	−0.82%
1982	586	−0.45%
1990	767	+3.42%
1999	818	+0.72%
2007	940	+1.75%
2012	988	+1.00%
2017	1,030	+0.84%
2023	1,126	+1.50%
Source: INSEE

== See also ==
- Communes of the Indre-et-Loire department
