= Artannes-sur-Indre =

- Commune
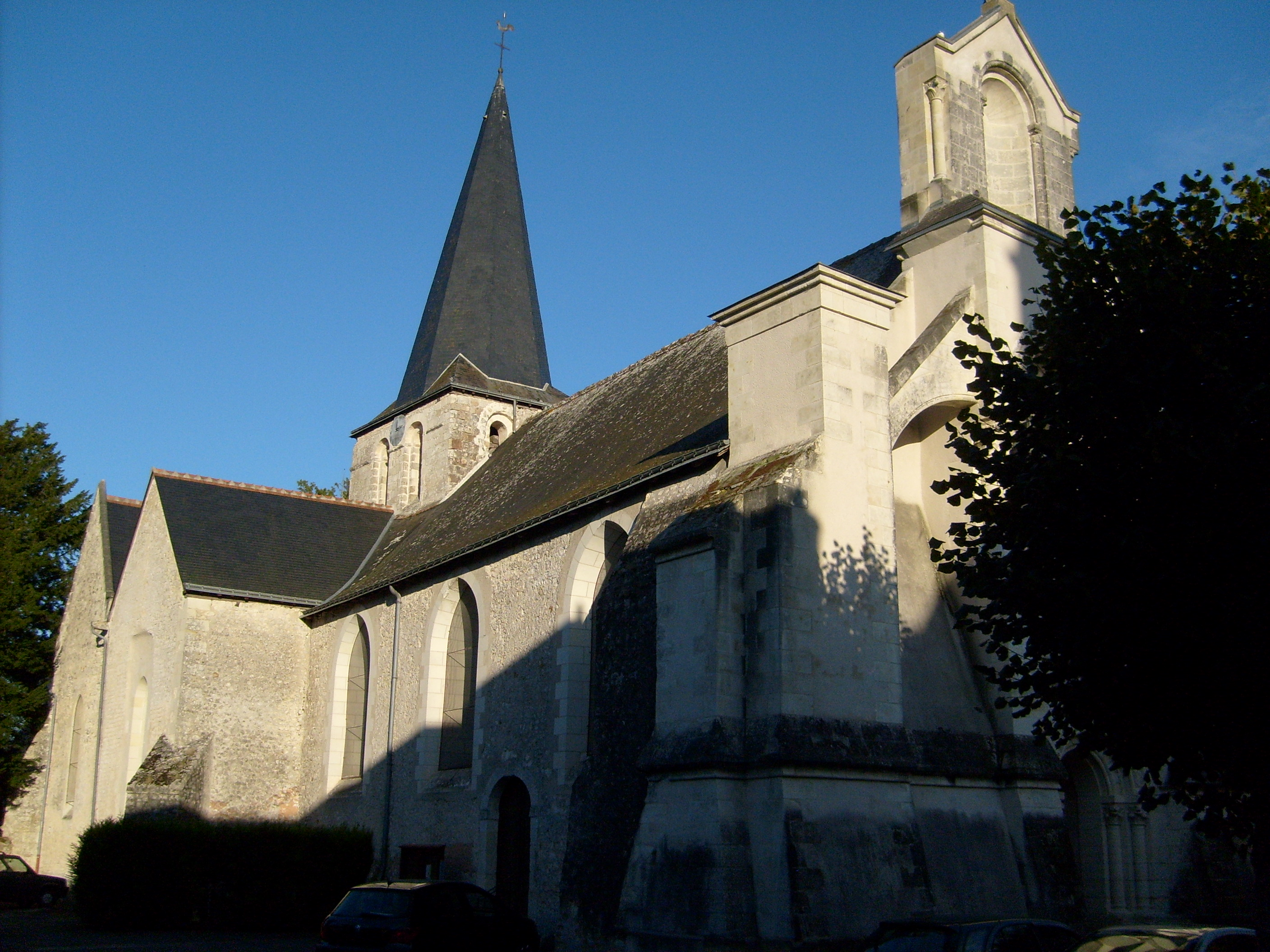
- The church in Artannes-sur-Indre

- Coat of arms
- Location of Artannes-sur-Indre
- Location within France Location within Centre-Val de Loire
- Coordinates: 47°16′28″N 0°36′00″E
- Country: France
- Region: Centre-Val de Loire
- Department: Indre-et-Loire
- Arrondissement: Tours
- Canton: Monts
- Intercommunality: CC Touraine Vallée Indre

Government
  - Mayor (2020–2026): Isabelle Delacôte
- Area^{1}: 20.97 km^{2} (8.10 sq mi)
- Highest elevation: 98 m (322 ft)
- Lowest elevation: 47 m (154 ft)
- Population (2023): 2,795
  - Density: 133.3/km^{2} (345.2/sq mi)
- Time zone: UTC+01:00 (CET)
  - Summer (DST): UTC+02:00 (CEST)
- INSEE/Postal code: 37006 /37260
- ^{1} French Land Register data, which excludes lakes, ponds, glaciers > 1 km^{2} (0.386 sq mi or 247 acres) and river estuaries.

Artannes-sur-Indre (French pronunciation: [aʁtan syʁ ɛ̃dʁ], literally Artannes on Indre) is a commune in the Indre-et-Loire department in central France.

== Population ==
Historical population

Year	Pop.	±% p.a.
1793	1,071	—
1800	1,006	−0.89%
1806	1,095	+1.42%
1821	960	−0.87%
1831	1,084	+1.22%
1836	1,084	+0.00%
1841	1,103	+0.35%
1846	1,095	−0.15%
1851	1,074	−0.39%
1856	1,112	+0.70%
1861	1,105	−0.13%
1866	1,115	+0.18%
1872	1,080	−0.53%
1876	1,130	+1.14%
1881	1,073	−1.03%
1886	1,129	+1.02%
1891	1,152	+0.40%
1896	1,070	−1.47%
1901	1,059	−0.21%

Year	Pop.	±% p.a.
1906	1,118	+1.09%
1911	1,073	−0.82%
1921	1,011	−0.59%
1926	1,056	+0.87%
1931	961	−1.87%
1936	996	+0.72%
1946	1,093	+0.93%
1954	1,132	+0.44%
1962	1,165	+0.36%
1968	1,154	−0.16%
1975	1,217	+0.76%
1982	1,402	+2.04%
1990	2,089	+5.11%
1999	2,184	+0.50%
2007	2,523	+1.82%
2012	2,493	−0.24%
2017	2,628	+1.06%
2023	2,795	+1.03%

Source: EHESS and INSEE (1968-2023)

== Town twinning ==
- (United Kingdom) Bathford, Somerset, Great Britain

== See also ==
- Communes of the Indre-et-Loire department
