= Saint-Paterne-Racan =

- Commune
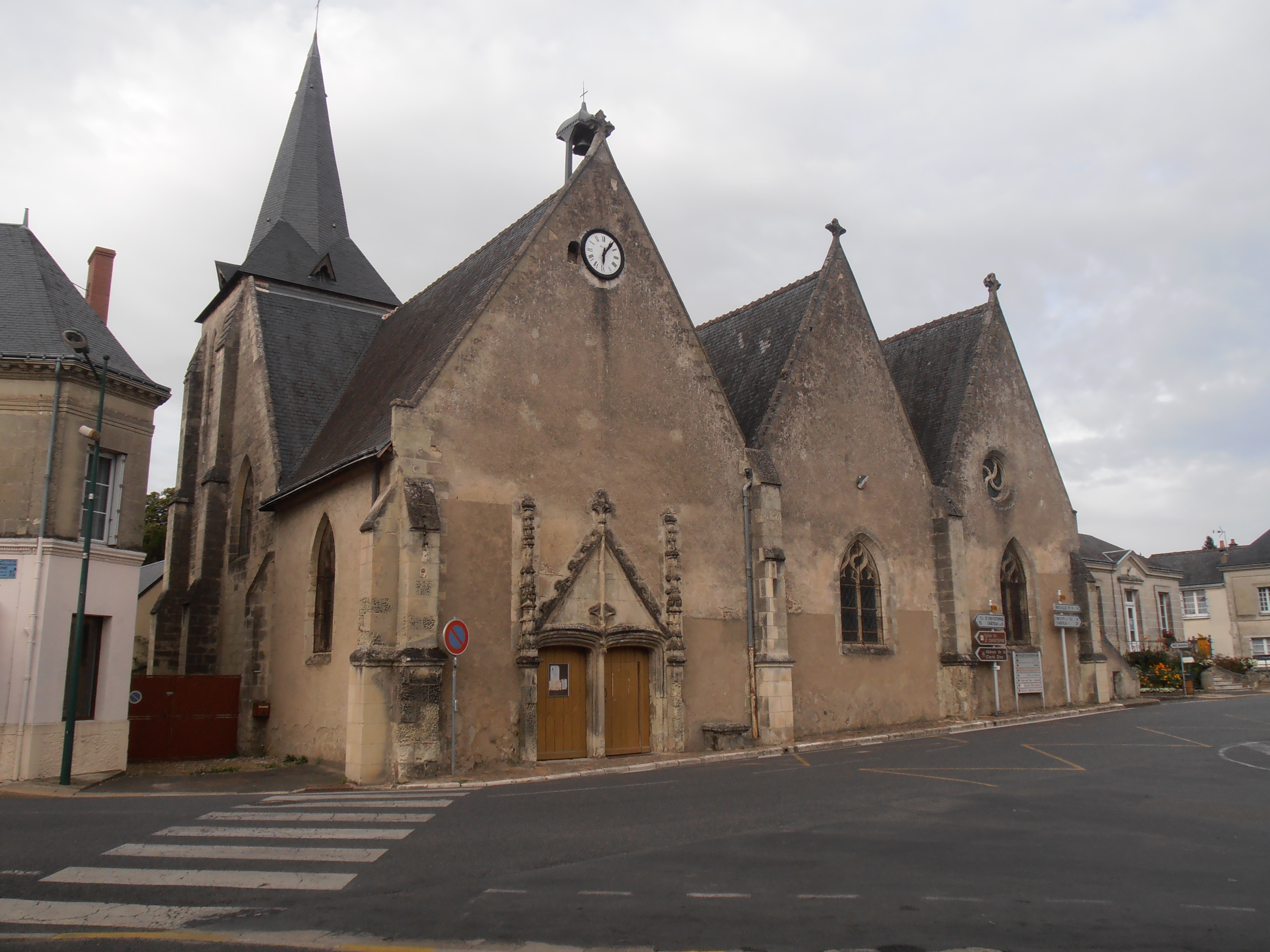
- The church in Saint-Paterne-Racan

- Coat of arms
- Location of Saint-Paterne-Racan
- Location within France Location within Centre-Val de Loire
- Coordinates: 47°36′10″N 0°28′59″E
- Country: France
- Region: Centre-Val de Loire
- Department: Indre-et-Loire
- Arrondissement: Chinon
- Canton: Château-Renault

Government
  - Mayor (2020–2026): Éric Lapleau
- Area^{1}: 47.77 km^{2} (18.44 sq mi)
- Highest elevation: 134 m (440 ft)
- Lowest elevation: 65 m (213 ft)
- Population (2023): 1,715
  - Density: 35.90/km^{2} (92.98/sq mi)
- Time zone: UTC+01:00 (CET)
  - Summer (DST): UTC+02:00 (CEST)
- INSEE/Postal code: 37231 /37370
- ^{1} French Land Register data, which excludes lakes, ponds, glaciers > 1 km^{2} (0.386 sq mi or 247 acres) and river estuaries.

Saint-Paterne-Racan is a commune in the Indre-et-Loire department in central France.

Saint-Paterne-Racan belongs to the urban unit of Saint-Paterne-Racan, a small agglomeration comprising 2 municipalities: Saint-Paterne-Racan and Saint-Christophe-sur-le-Nais.

== Population ==
Historical population
Year	Pop.	±% p.a.
1968	1,617	—
1975	1,718	+0.87%
1982	1,508	−1.85%
1990	1,449	−0.50%
1999	1,511	+0.47%
2007	1,655	+1.14%
2012	1,637	−0.22%
2017	1,665	+0.34%
2023	1,715	+0.49%
Source: INSEE

== See also ==
- Communes of the Indre-et-Loire department
