= Sorigny =

- Commune
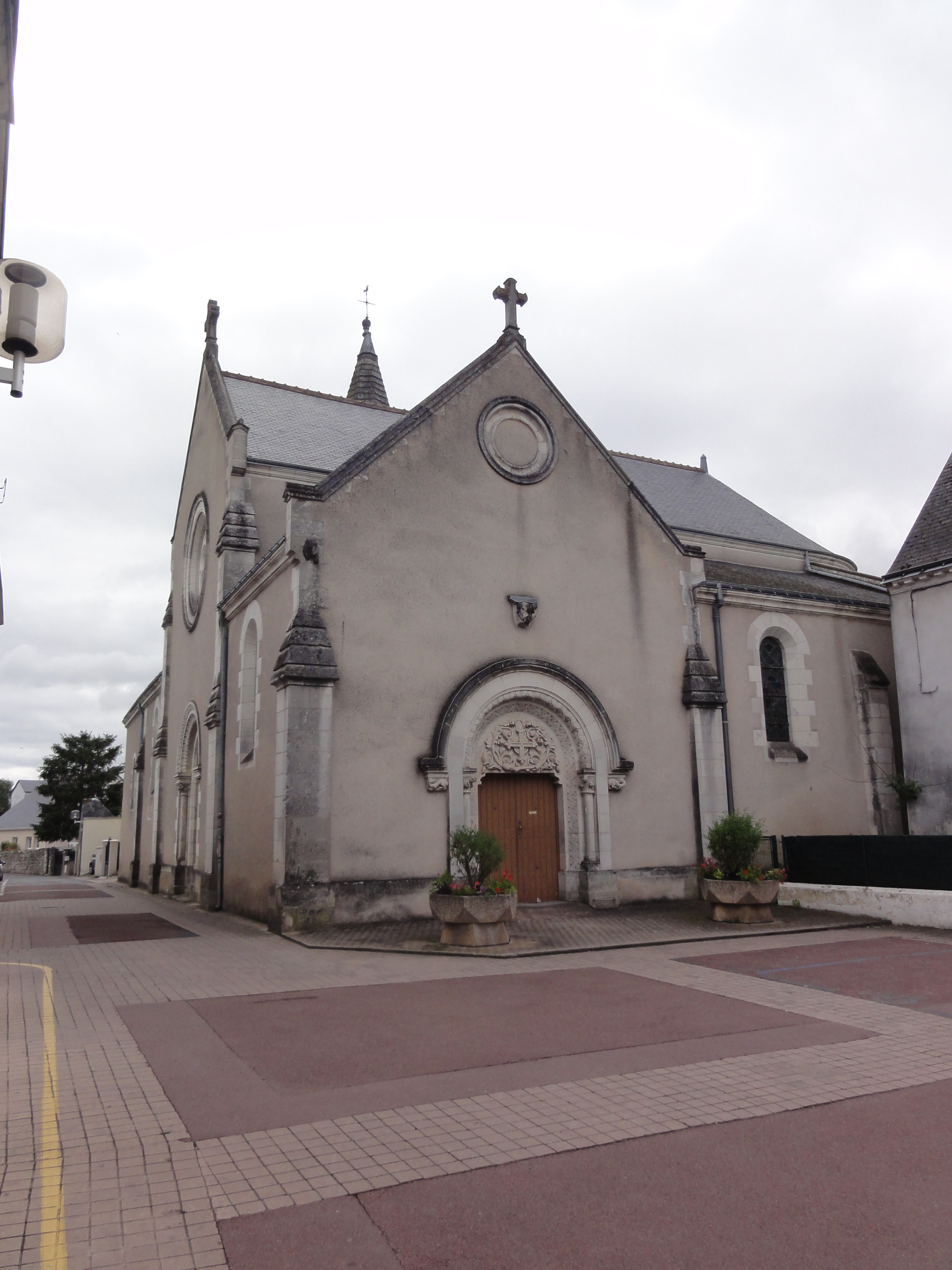
- The church of Saint-Pierre-ès-Liens in Sorigny

- Coat of arms
- Location of Sorigny
- Location within France Location within Centre-Val de Loire
- Coordinates: 47°14′33″N 0°41′46″E
- Country: France
- Region: Centre-Val de Loire
- Department: Indre-et-Loire
- Arrondissement: Tours
- Canton: Monts

Government
  - Mayor (2020–2026): Alain Esnault
- Area^{1}: 43.43 km^{2} (16.77 sq mi)
- Highest elevation: 123 m (404 ft)
- Lowest elevation: 68 m (223 ft)
- Population (2023): 2,938
  - Density: 67.65/km^{2} (175.2/sq mi)
- Time zone: UTC+01:00 (CET)
  - Summer (DST): UTC+02:00 (CEST)
- INSEE/Postal code: 37250 /37250
- ^{1} French Land Register data, which excludes lakes, ponds, glaciers > 1 km^{2} (0.386 sq mi or 247 acres) and river estuaries.

Sorigny (French pronunciation: [sɔʁiɲi]) is a commune in the Indre-et-Loire department in the Centre-Val de Loire region of France.

== History ==
Sorigny is first mentioned in a charter of Robert II of France dated March 1031, which confirmed the parish. It was formerly divided into two fiefs.

== Hydrography ==
The municipal hydrographic network, with a total length of 31.09 km, includes two notable rivers, the Bourdin (3.075 km) and the Montison (2.731 km), as well as ten intermittent streams.

The Bourdin, with a total length of 14.8 km, rises in the commune of Louans and flows into the Indre at Veigné after crossing five communes.

== Transport ==
Public transport in Sorigny is managed by the Centre-Val de Loire region and operated by Transdev Touraine as part of the Rémi network. Sorigny is connected to Tours by coach routes G, H, H1 and H2.

== Economy ==
In 2018, the commune announced plans to establish an outlet shopping village on 20 hectares near the A10 autoroute.

Sorigny is part of the Touraine Vallée de l'Indre intercommunal authority (Communauté de communes Touraine Vallée de l'Indre).

== Population ==
Historical population

| Year | Pop. | ±% p.a. |
|---|---|---|
| 1793 | 1,350 | — |
| 1800 | 1,241 | −1.20% |
| 1806 | 1,366 | +1.61% |
| 1821 | 1,428 | +0.30% |
| 1831 | 1,564 | +0.91% |
| 1836 | 1,617 | +0.67% |
| 1841 | 1,513 | −1.32% |
| 1846 | 1,602 | +1.15% |
| 1851 | 1,507 | −1.22% |
| 1856 | 1,462 | −0.60% |
| 1861 | 1,403 | −0.82% |
| 1866 | 1,340 | −0.91% |
| 1872 | 1,271 | −0.88% |
| 1876 | 1,226 | −0.90% |
| 1881 | 1,125 | −1.70% |
| 1886 | 1,077 | −0.87% |
| 1891 | 1,142 | +1.18% |
| 1896 | 1,080 | −1.11% |
| 1901 | 1,067 | −0.24% |

| Year | Pop. | ±% p.a. |
|---|---|---|
| 1906 | 1,090 | +0.43% |
| 1911 | 1,077 | −0.24% |
| 1921 | 994 | −0.80% |
| 1926 | 1,072 | +1.52% |
| 1931 | 1,084 | +0.22% |
| 1936 | 1,105 | +0.38% |
| 1946 | 1,168 | +0.56% |
| 1954 | 1,227 | +0.62% |
| 1962 | 1,178 | −0.51% |
| 1968 | 1,256 | +1.07% |
| 1975 | 1,313 | +0.64% |
| 1982 | 1,520 | +2.11% |
| 1990 | 1,637 | +0.93% |
| 1999 | 1,923 | +1.81% |
| 2007 | 2,105 | +1.14% |
| 2012 | 2,354 | +2.26% |
| 2017 | 2,643 | +2.34% |
| 2023 | 2,938 | +1.78% |

Source: EHESS and INSEE (1968–2023)

== Notable people ==
- Marcel Gaumont (1880–1962), sculptor

== Town twinning ==
- (United Kingdom) Box, Wiltshire, England (since 2016)

== Notable buildings and monuments ==
- Église Saint-Pierre-ès-Liens (Saint-Pierre-ès-Liens Church), built in the 11th century and rebuilt in 1866 by Étienne Guérin Charles Gustavus.
- Château de Longue Plaine (Longue-Plaine Castle), built in the 19th century except for two towers dating from the 15th and 16th centuries.
- Monument aux morts (war memorial) commemorating the First World War, designed by the sculptor Marcel Gaumont and the architect Maurice Boille.
- Tours Aerodrome.

== Gallery ==
Coat of arms of Sorigny

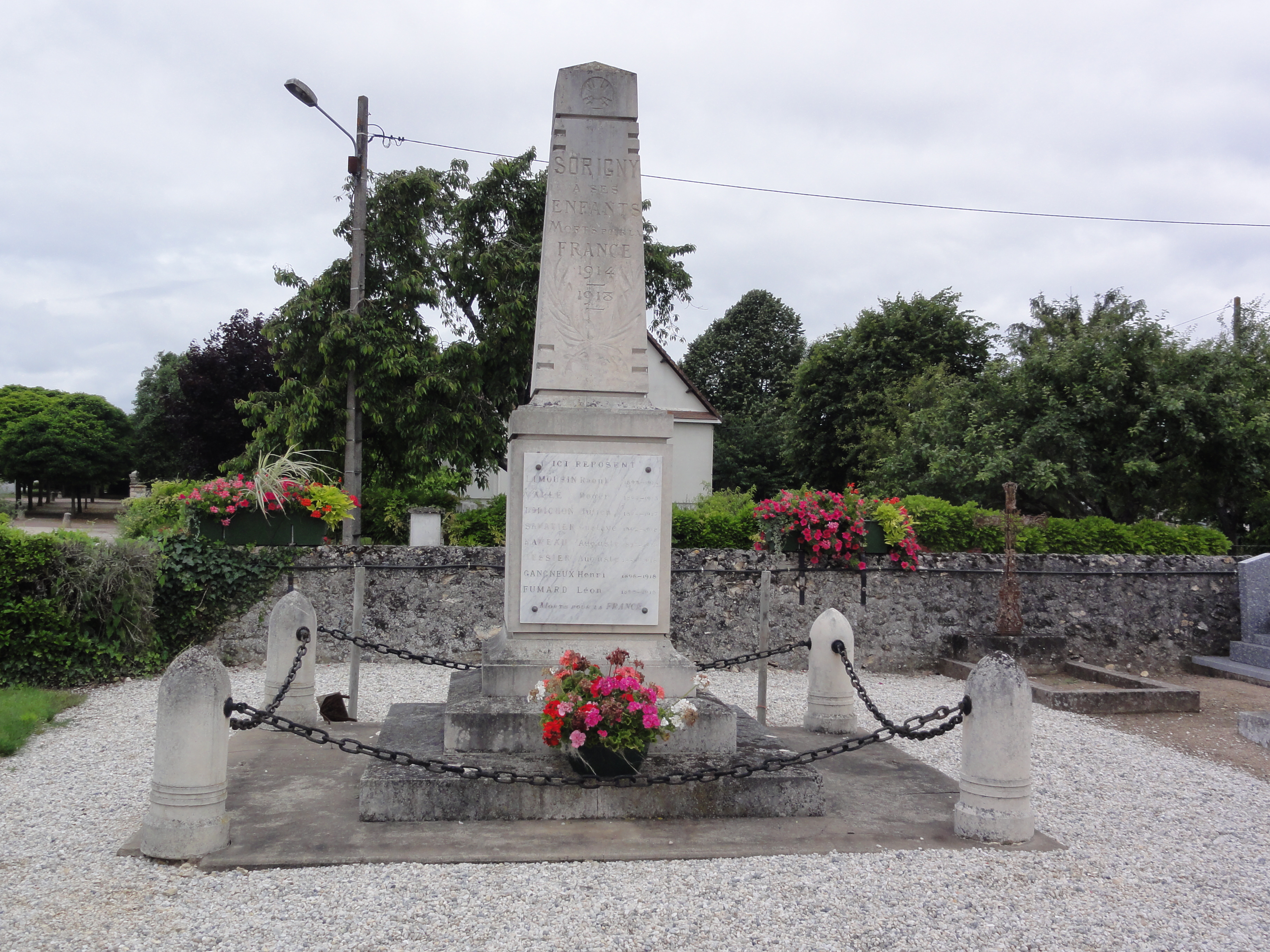
War memorial in a cemetery (monument aux morts)

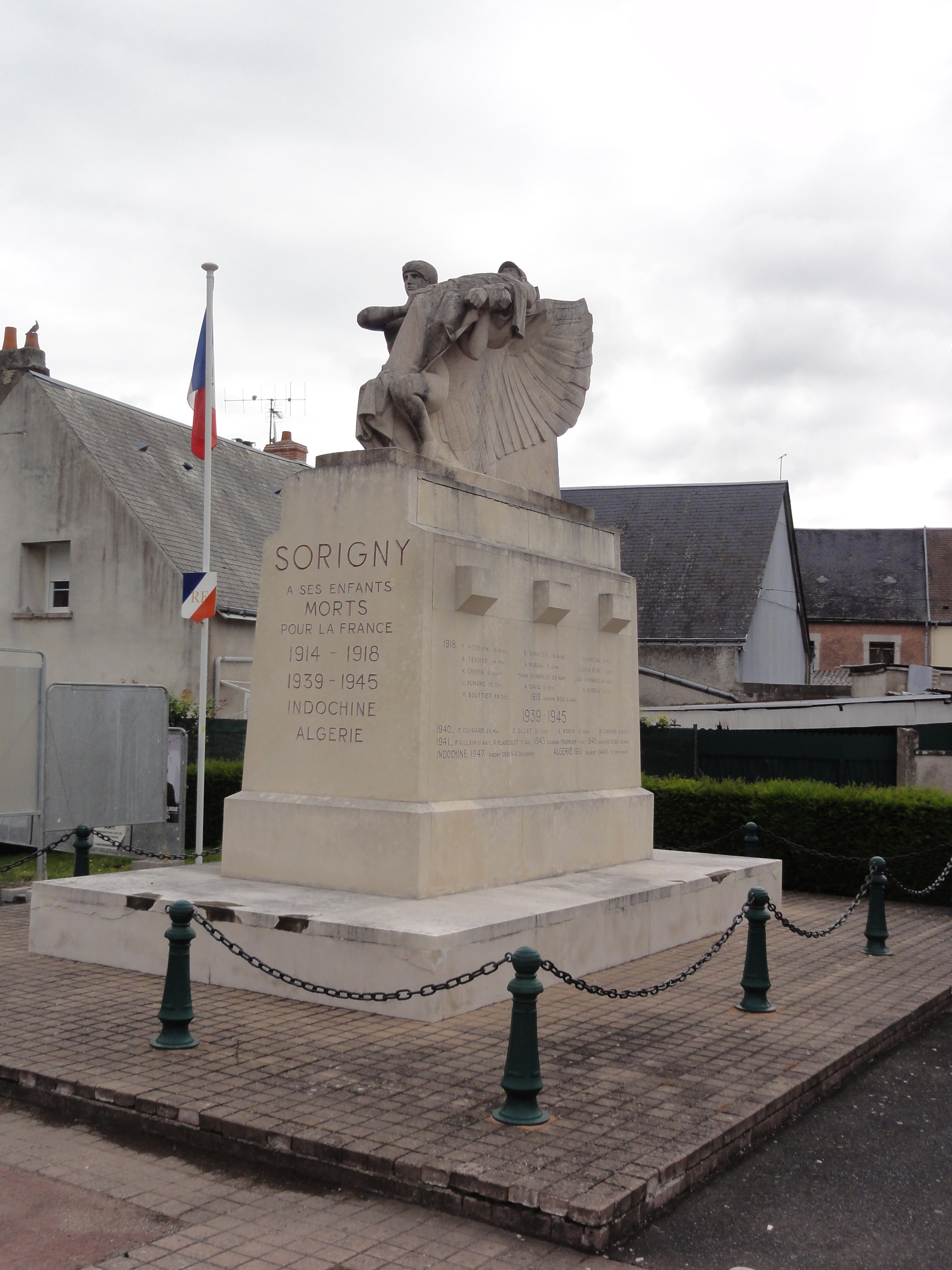
Communal war memorial

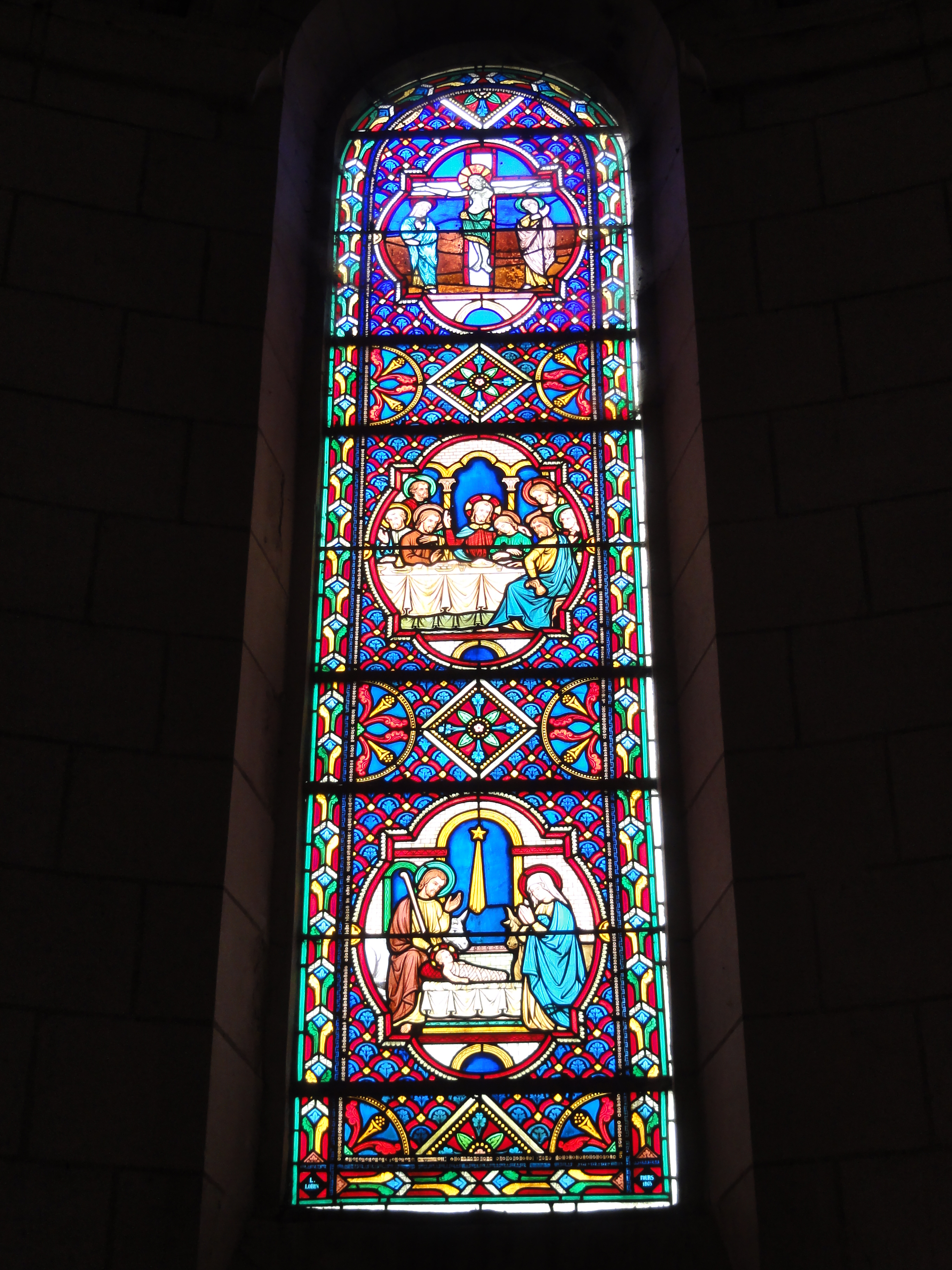
Stained glass window in the church of Saint-Pierre-ès-Liens

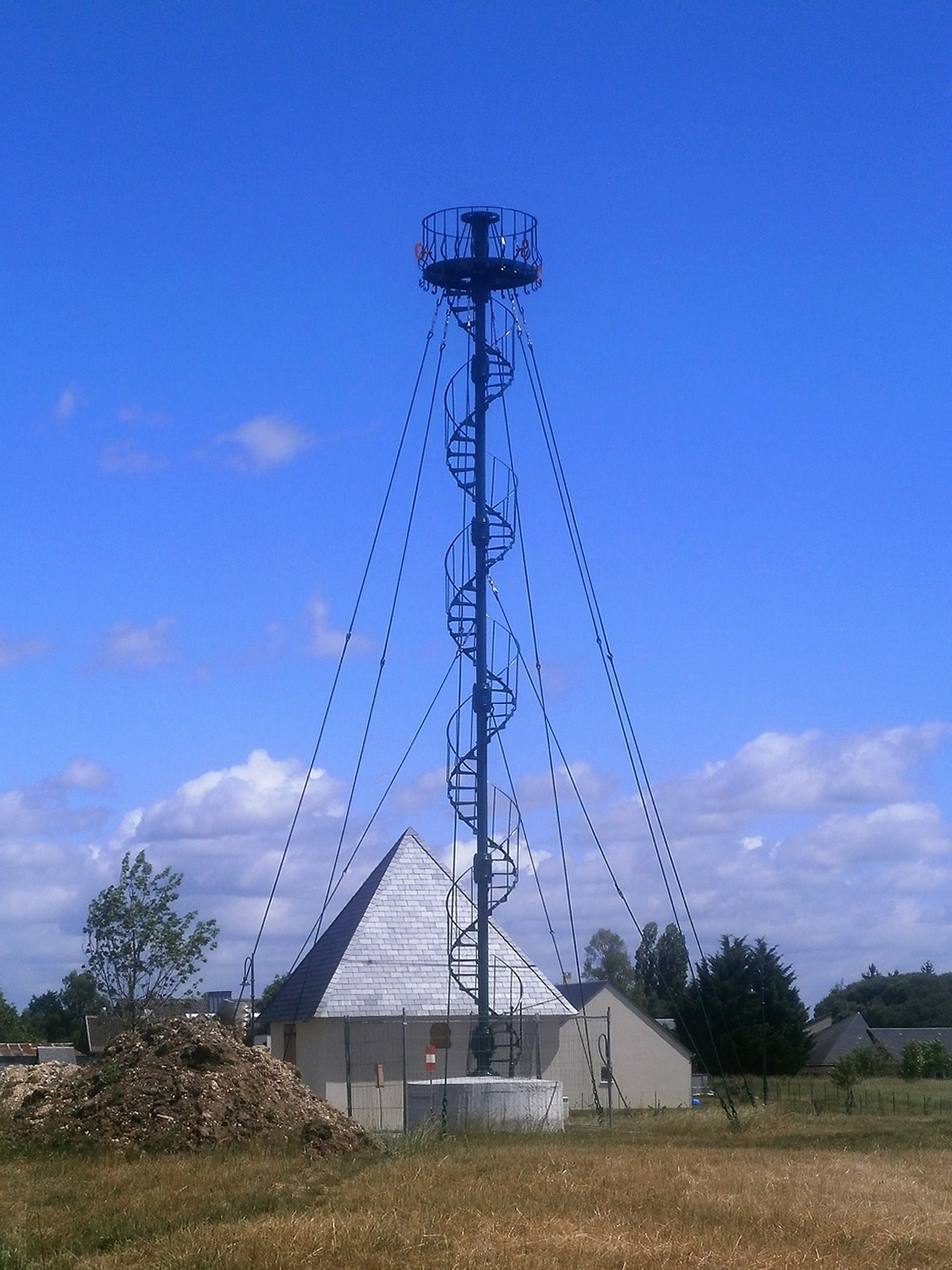
Wind turbine (éolienne)

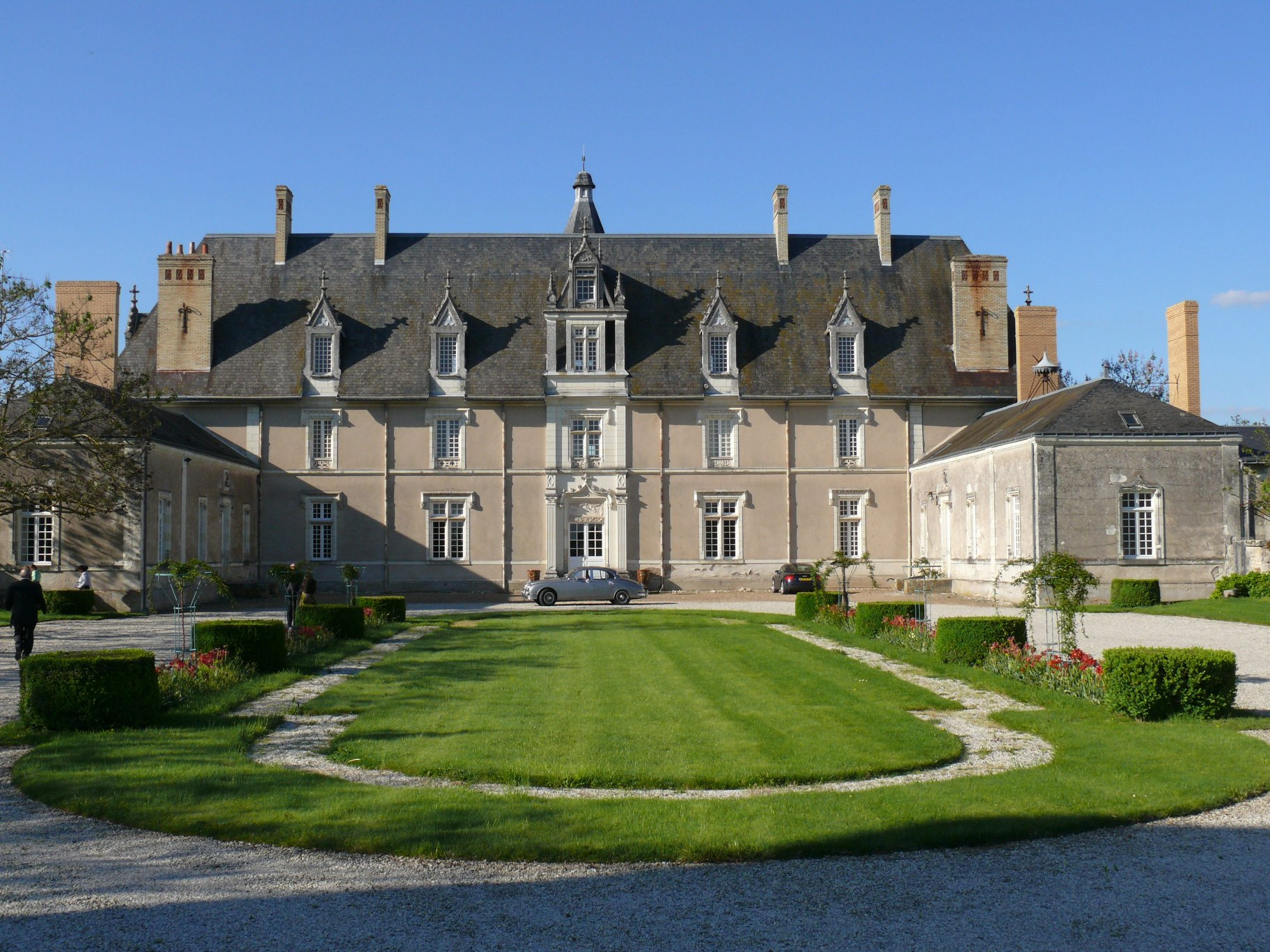
Longue-Plaine Castle in Sorigny

== See also ==
- Communes of the Indre-et-Loire department
- Marcel Gaumont
