= Veigné =

- Commune
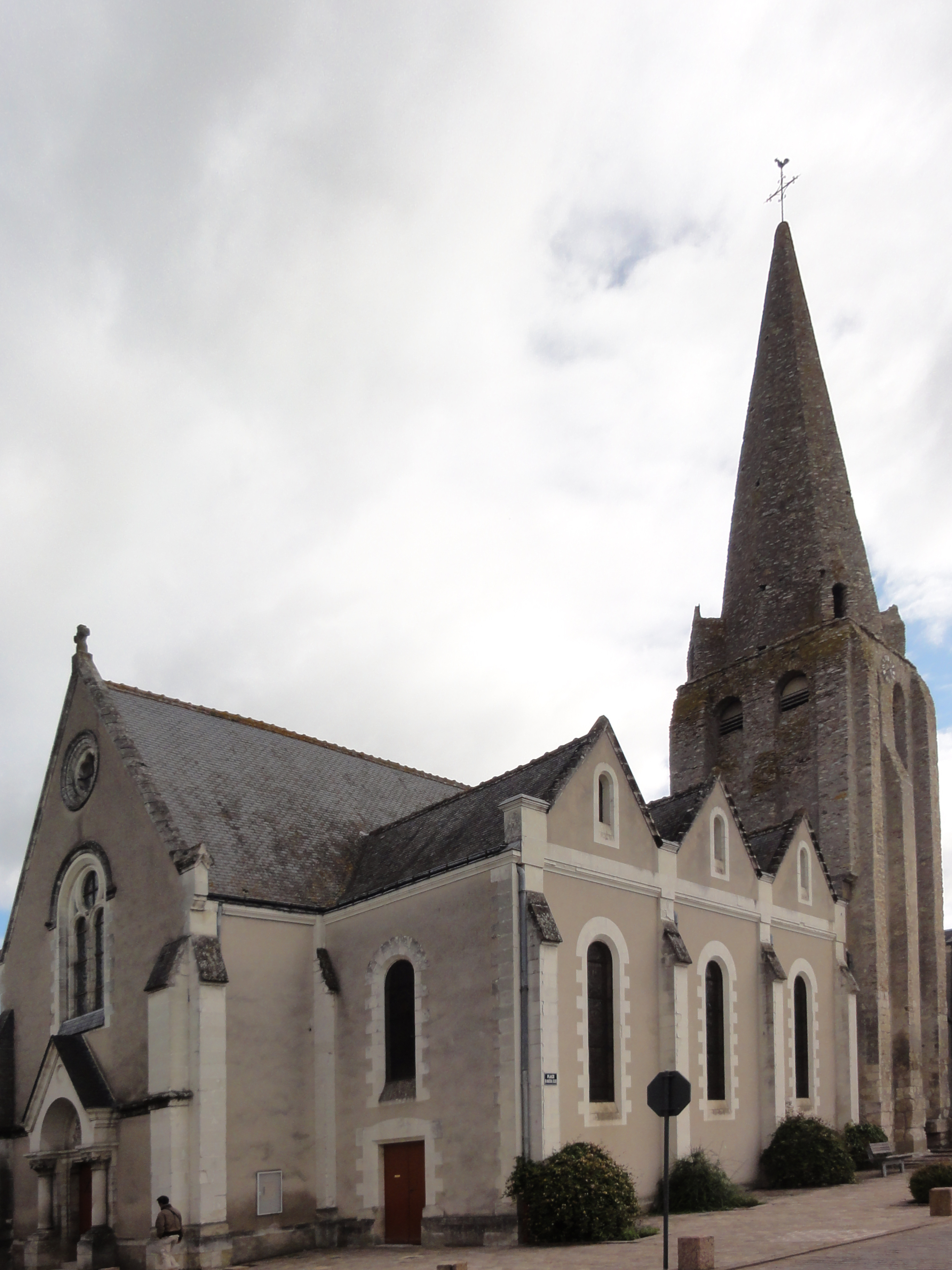
- The church of Saint-Maxent, in Veigné

- Coat of arms
- Location of Veigné
- Location within France Location within Centre-Val de Loire
- Coordinates: 47°17′18″N 0°44′18″E
- Country: France
- Region: Centre-Val de Loire
- Department: Indre-et-Loire
- Arrondissement: Tours
- Canton: Monts

Government
  - Mayor (2020–2026): Patrick Michaud
- Area^{1}: 26.58 km^{2} (10.26 sq mi)
- Highest elevation: 94 m (308 ft)
- Lowest elevation: 51 m (167 ft)
- Population (2023): 6,865
  - Density: 258.3/km^{2} (668.9/sq mi)
- Time zone: UTC+01:00 (CET)
  - Summer (DST): UTC+02:00 (CEST)
- INSEE/Postal code: 37266 /37250
- ^{1} French Land Register data, which excludes lakes, ponds, glaciers > 1 km^{2} (0.386 sq mi or 247 acres) and river estuaries.

Veigné (French pronunciation: [vɛɲe]) is a commune in the Indre-et-Loire department in central France.

== Geography ==
Veigné is located next to the river Indre, 12 kilometres south of Tours.

== Population ==
Historical population

Year	Pop.	±% p.a.
1793	880	—
1800	1,173	+4.19%
1806	998	−2.66%
1821	1,037	+0.26%
1831	1,240	+1.80%
1836	1,289	+0.78%
1841	1,303	+0.22%
1846	1,343	+0.61%
1851	1,297	−0.69%
1856	1,245	−0.82%
1861	1,298	+0.84%
1866	1,333	+0.53%
1872	1,269	−0.82%
1876	1,621	+6.31%
1881	1,520	−1.28%
1886	1,457	−0.84%
1891	1,391	−0.92%
1896	1,346	−0.66%
1901	1,295	−0.77%

Year	Pop.	±% p.a.
1906	1,357	+0.94%
1911	1,361	+0.06%
1921	1,354	−0.05%
1926	1,348	−0.09%
1931	1,336	−0.18%
1936	1,379	+0.64%
1946	1,695	+2.08%
1954	1,852	+1.11%
1962	1,891	+0.26%
1968	2,420	+4.20%
1975	3,616	+5.90%
1982	4,199	+2.16%
1990	4,520	+0.93%
1999	5,474	+2.15%
2007	5,938	+1.02%
2012	6,088	+0.50%
2017	6,266	+0.58%
2023	6,865	+1.53%

Source: EHESS and INSEE (1968–2023)

== See also ==
- Communes of the Indre-et-Loire department
