= French bicycle industry =

The French bicycle industry and the history of the bicycle are intertwined. Spanning the last century and a half, the industry has seen two booms, and continues into the 21st century, albeit less dominant today.

== Invention ==
To most the invention of the bicycle was by the German Baron Karl von Drais, who rode his 1816 machine while collecting taxes from his tenants. He patented his "draisine" (or "draisienne"), a "pushbike" powered by the action of the rider's feet pushing against the ground.

Reports of early forebears of the bicycle were velocipedes, and included many human-powered vehicles. One, the scooter-like dandy horse or celerifere of the French Comte de Sivrac, dating to 1790, was long cited as the earliest bicycle, however, most historians now believe these unsteerable hobby-horses probably never existed, but were made up by Louis Baudry de Saunier, a 19th-century French bicycle historian.

== Commercialization ==
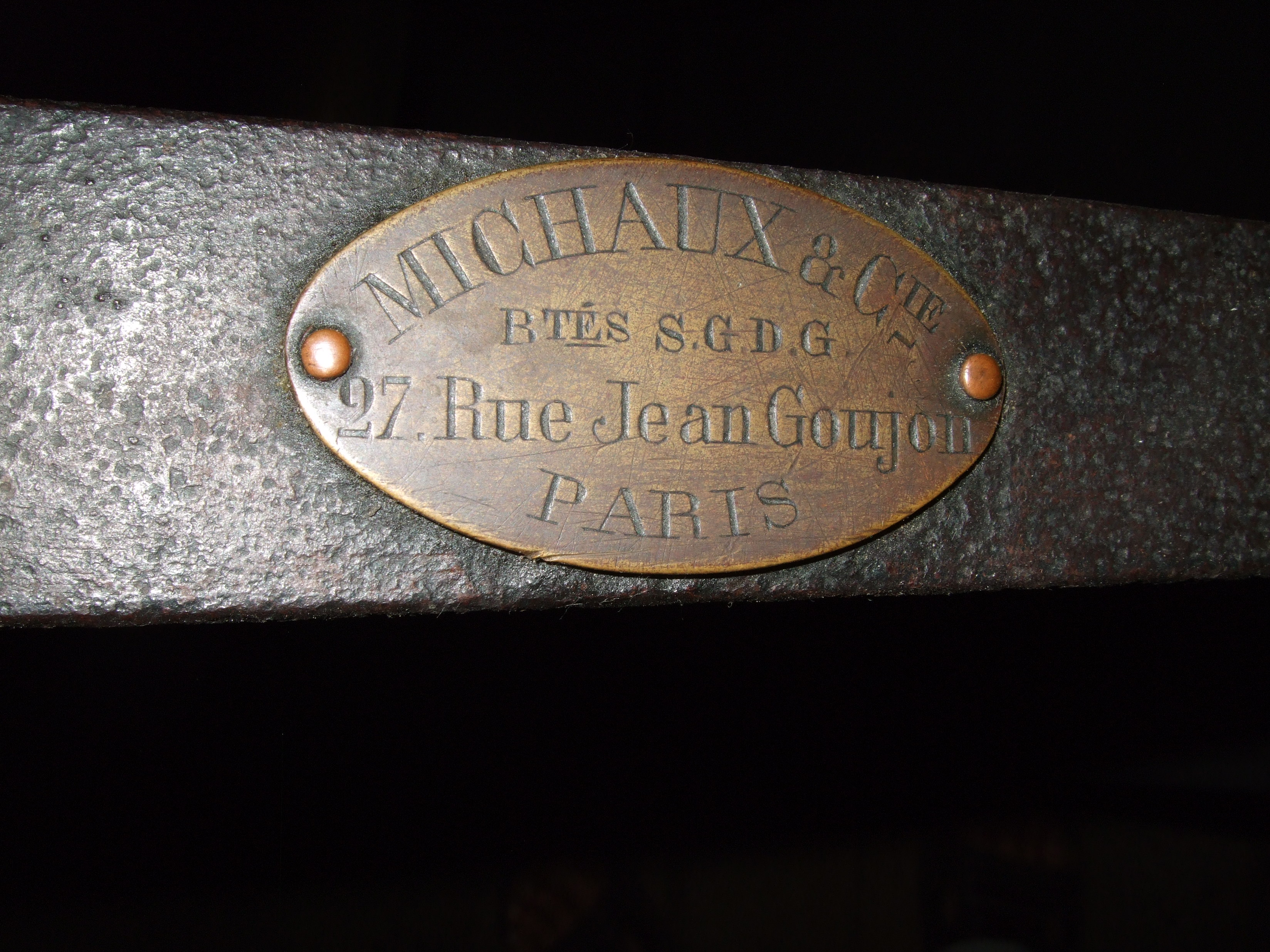
Badge on Michaux velocipede

In the 1860s, the Michaux family, Parisian coach builders, developed a new drive mechanism, placing pedals and cranks on an enlarged wooden front wheel with iron tires, which was mounted on a heavy steel frame. The credit for their innovative crank and pedals remains in dispute. Pierre Lallement, a Michaux mechanic, claimed to have collaborated with Ernest Michaux, while Henry Michaux told in March 1893 in the newspaper L'Éclair how his brother Ernest, together with their father Pierre have developed the idea in 1861 after modifying a draisine brought for repairs. The design was an adaptation of the crank-handles the two inventors had seen on a grinding wheel. In any event, Pierre Michaux's factory started producing crank-and-pedal driven velocipedes : two the first year, 142 the following year.

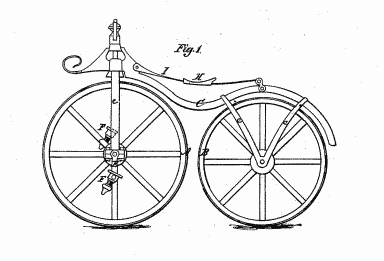
An early pedal-bicycle, with the serpentine frame, from Pierre Lallement's U.S. patent 59,915 drawing, 1866

Perhaps owing to dispute over the invention, in 1865 Lallement emigrated to The United States, where, with the financial backing of James Carroll of Ansonia, Connecticut, he recorded the first U.S. patent on a bicycle, in 1866. Meanwhile, by 1865, the Michaux family was manufacturing 400 velocipedes annually; their bicycles were on display at the first international bicycle exhibition in 1867, and by 1869, the Michaux factory, with a daily production of 200, began selling in the United States. Their wood and iron construction earned these velocipedes the sobriquet Boneshakers. The first boneshaker race was in 1868, in Paris' Parc de Saint Cloud; the winner was James Moore, a friend of the Michaux family. Moore also won the 123 km Paris–Rouen race in 1869, finishing in 10 hours and 40 minutes.

However, tensions between France and Prussia building since the Austro-Prussian War of 1866 erupted into the Franco-Prussian War in 1870, and production of bicycles at Michaux was suspended to support the war effort. As a result, the next innovations occurred in Great Britain. Prior to the Franco-Prussian war, the Michaux family had reached an agreement with Rowley B. Turner of the Coventry Sewing Machine Company to manufacture 400 Michaux velocipedes to be sold in France. With the war, Turner arranged instead to sell them in England. James Starley, a foreman at Coventry, began to make improvements and in 1885, the Starley Rover, a "safety bicycle" manufactured by Starley's nephew, John Kemp Starley, was the first recognisably modern bicycle.

=== Gallery ===
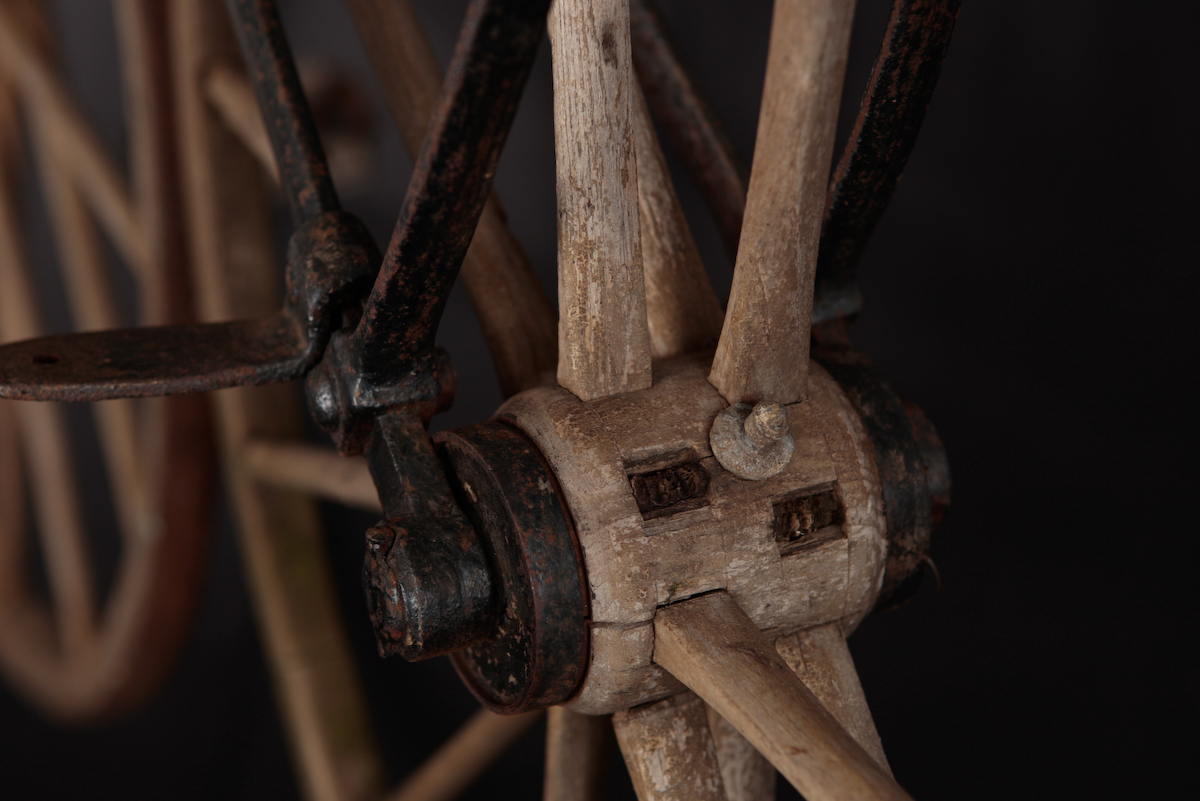

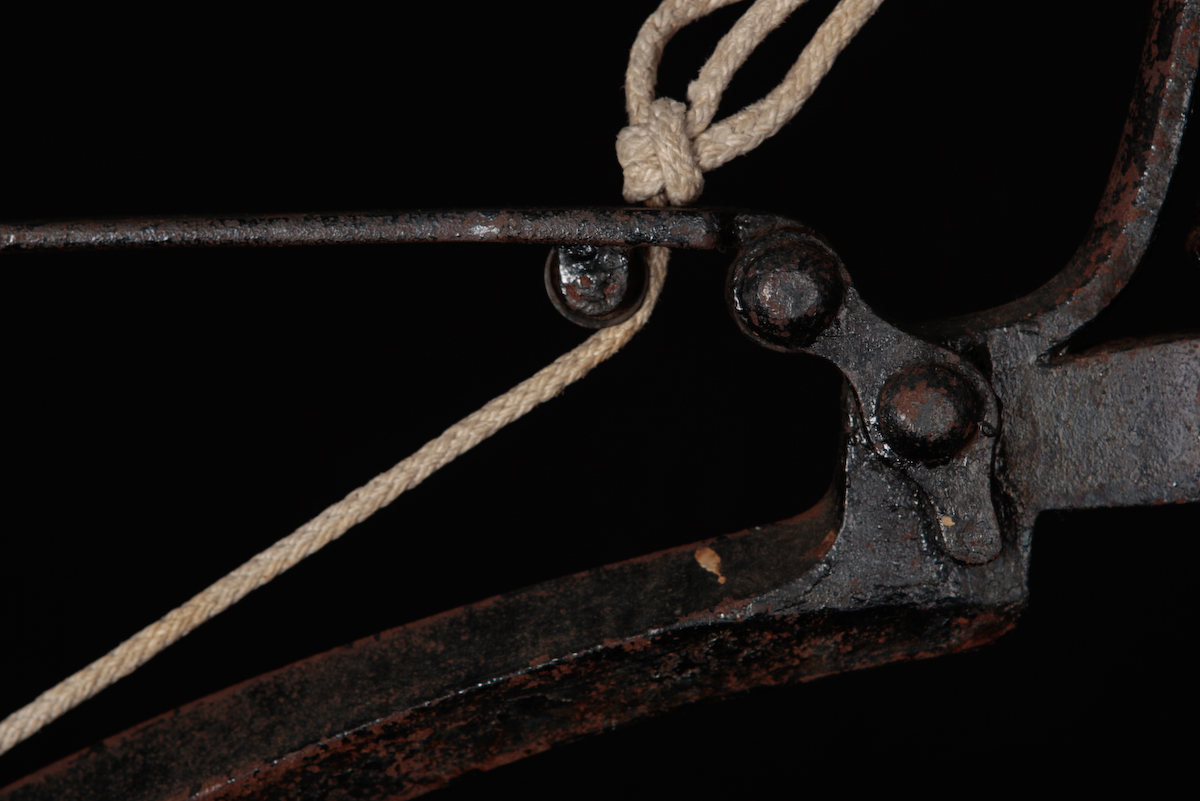

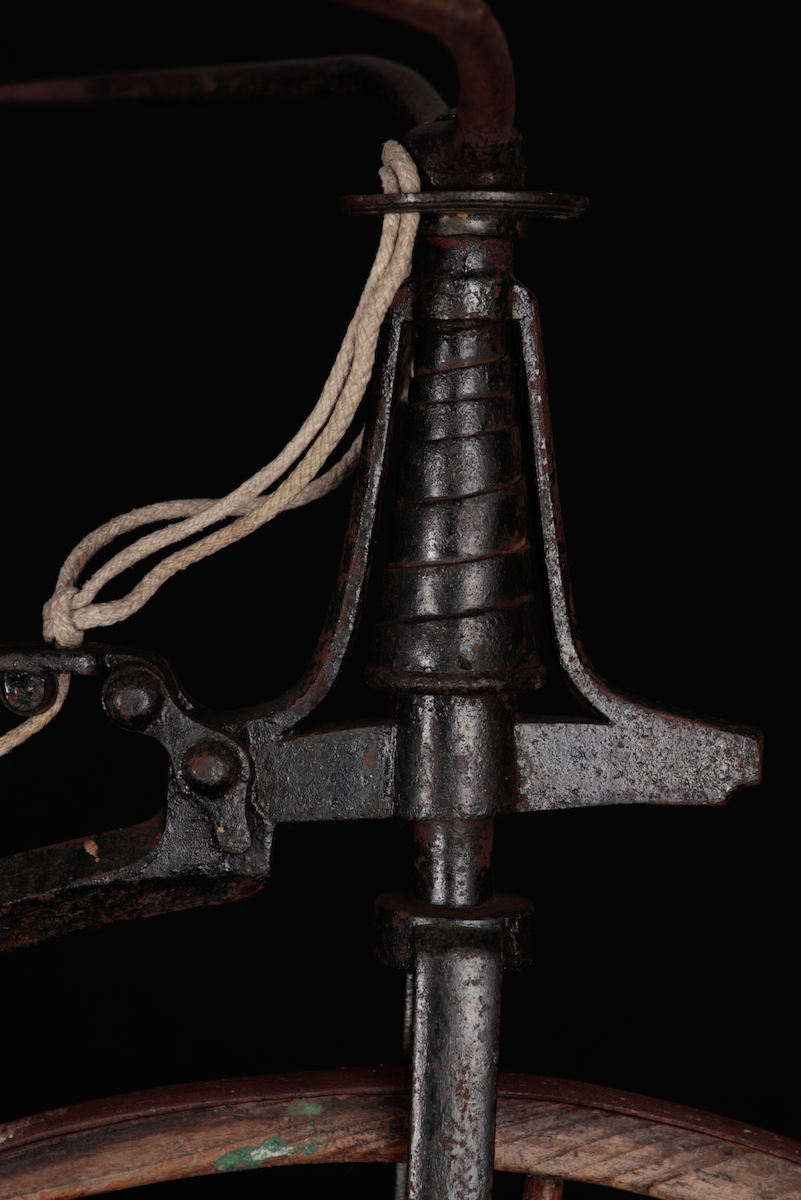

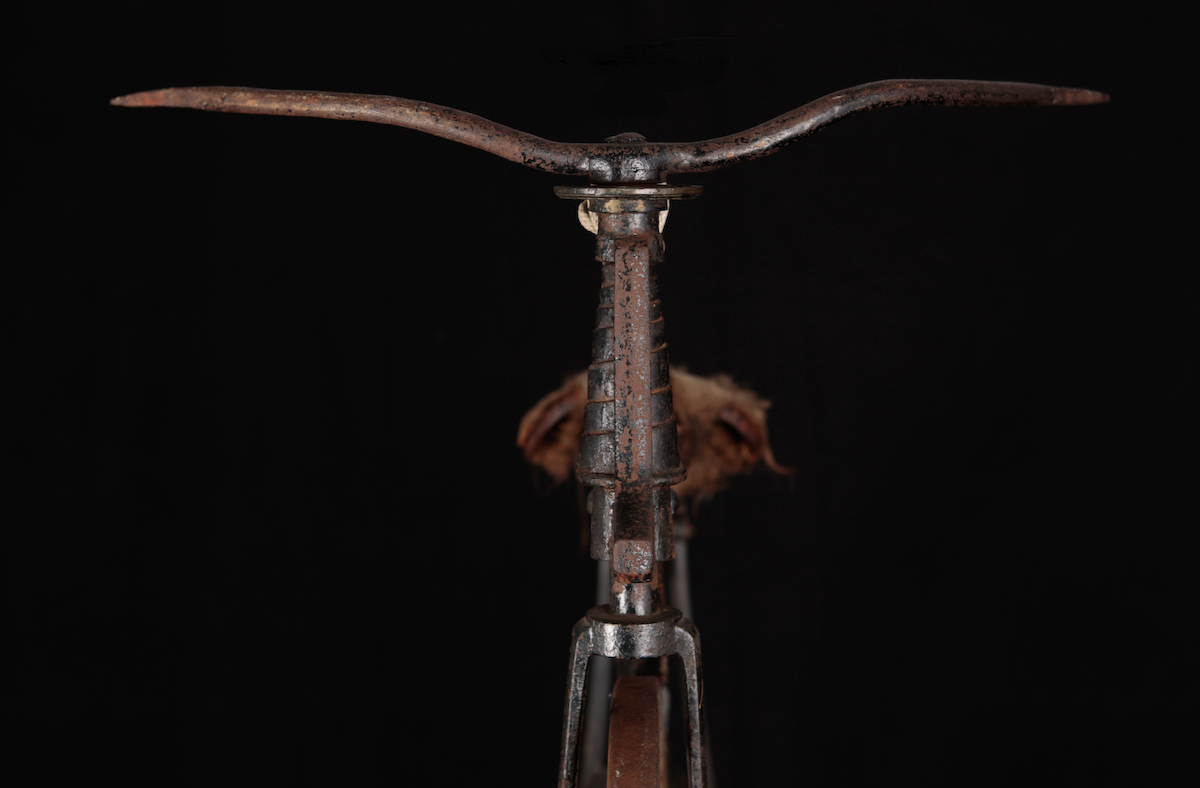

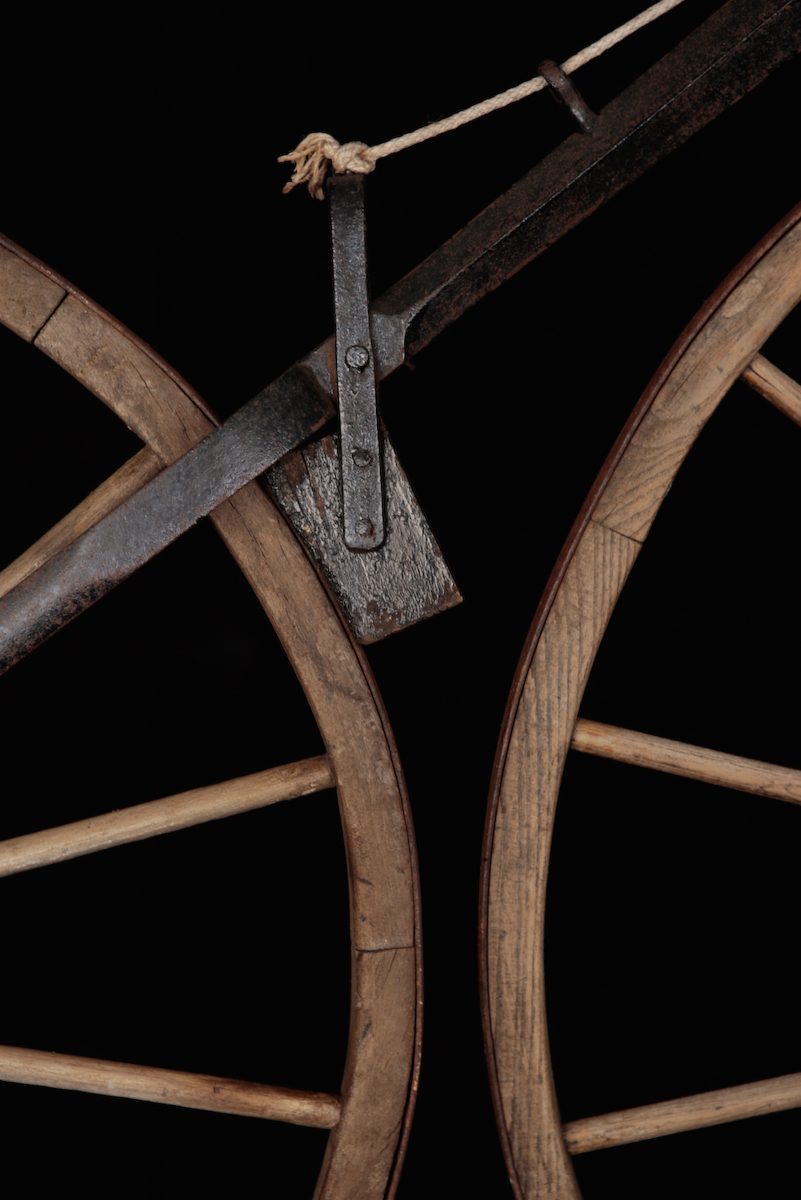

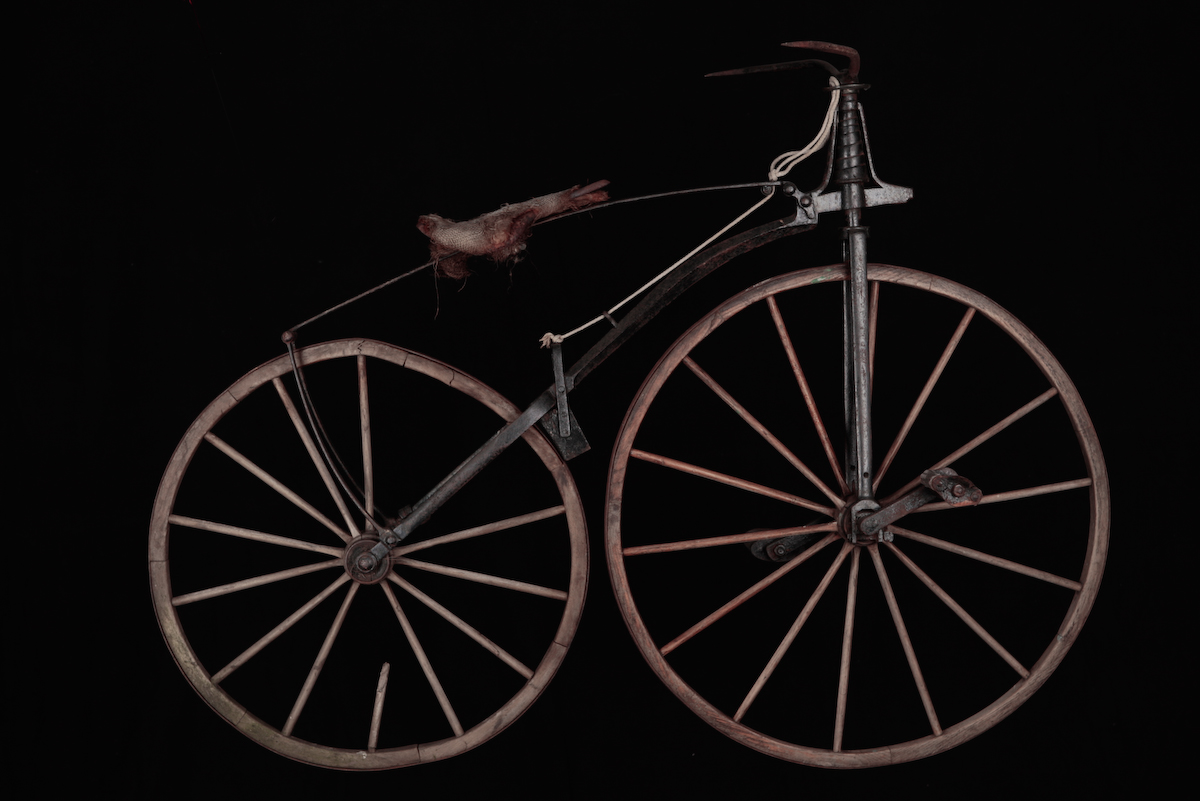

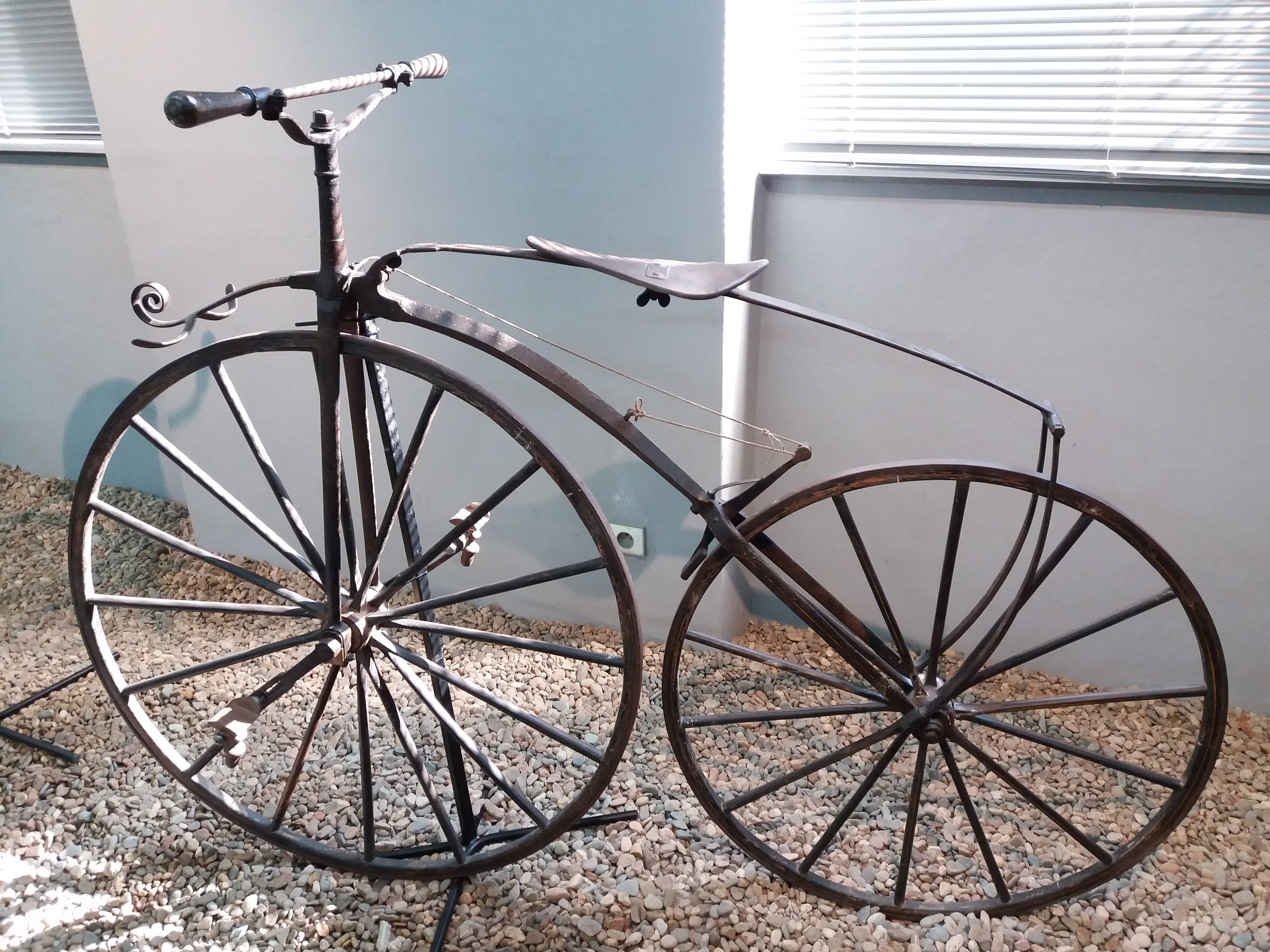

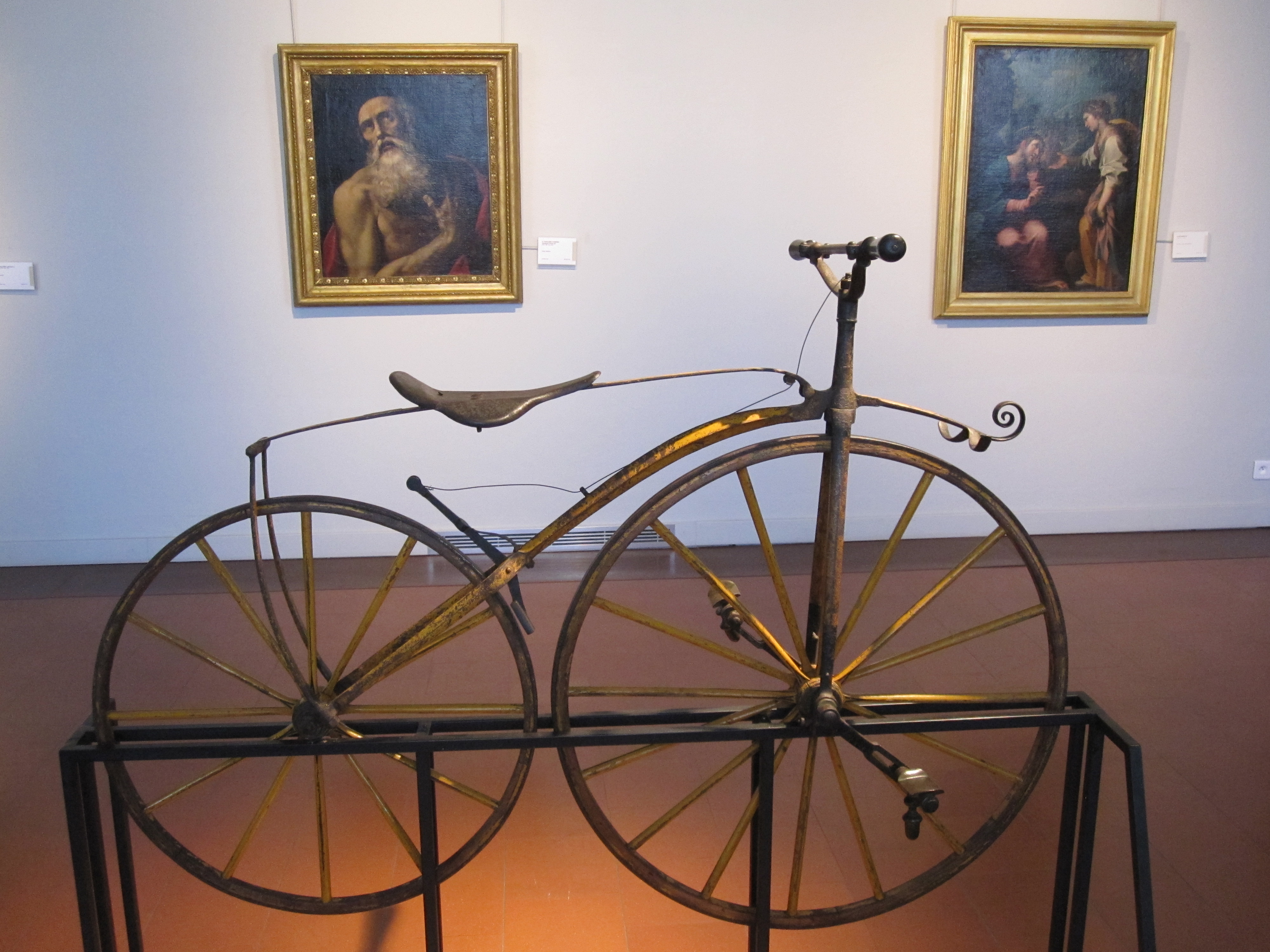

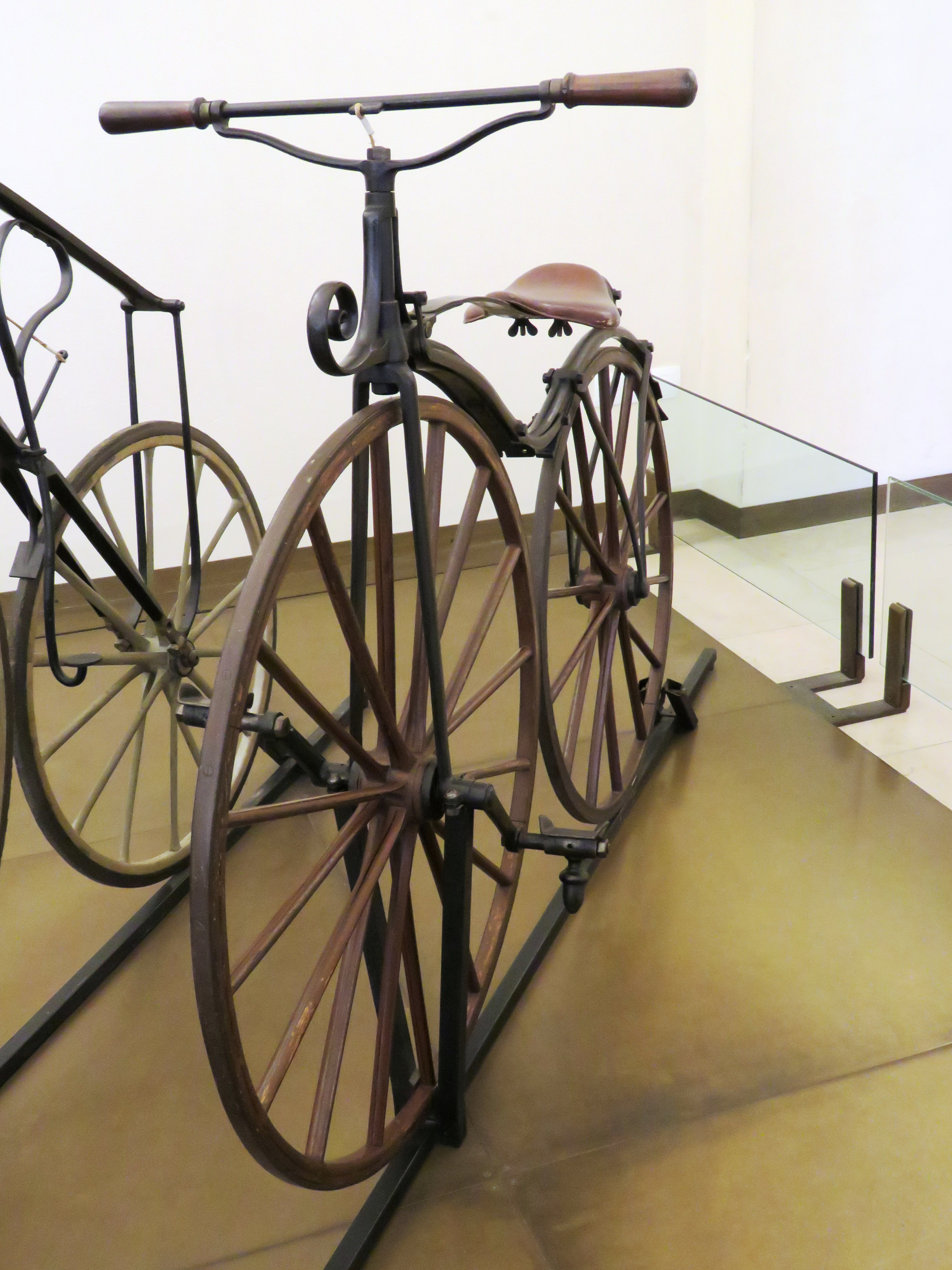

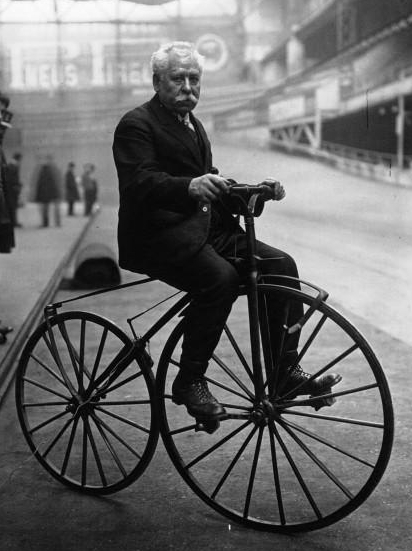

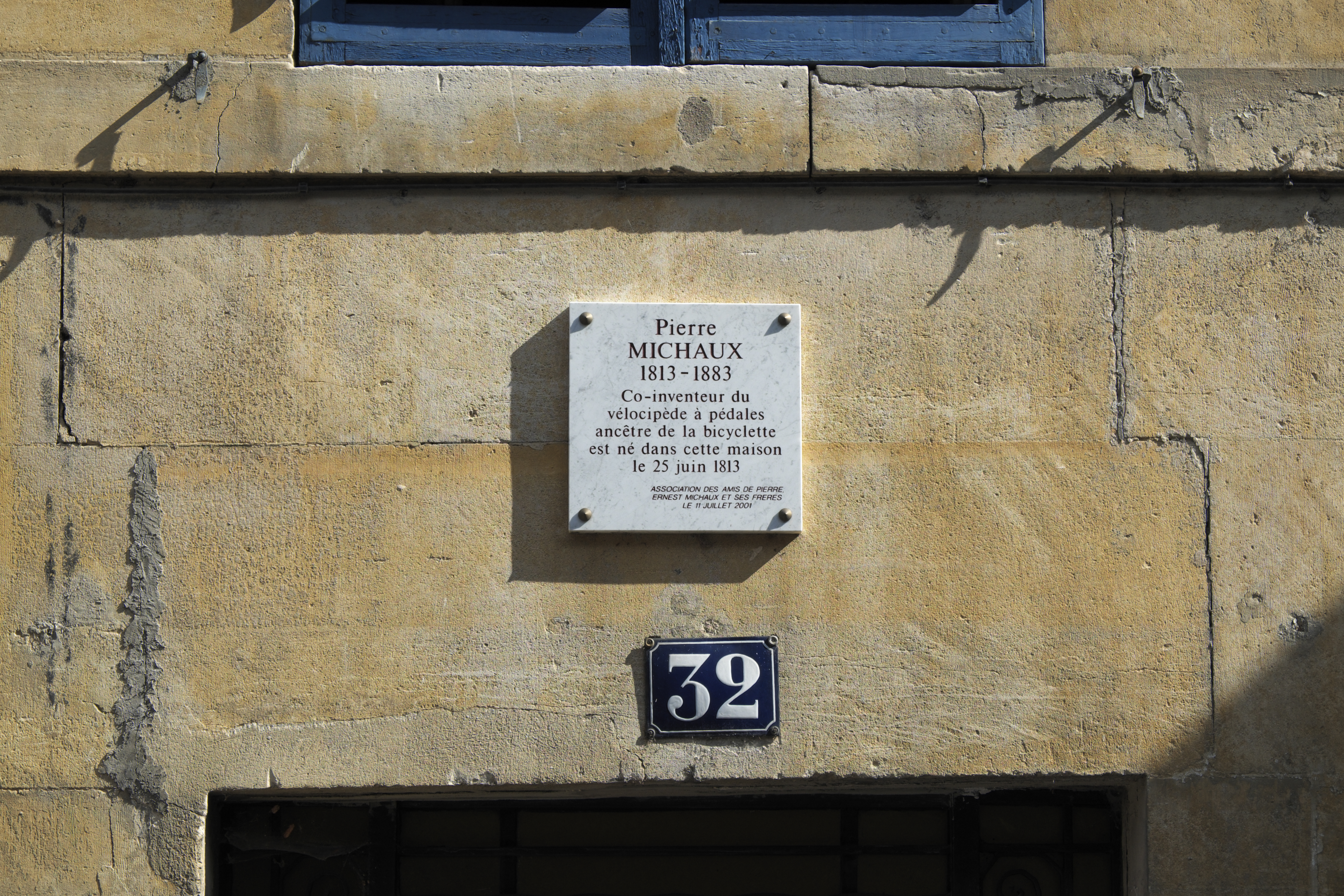

== Steam-powered motorcycle ==
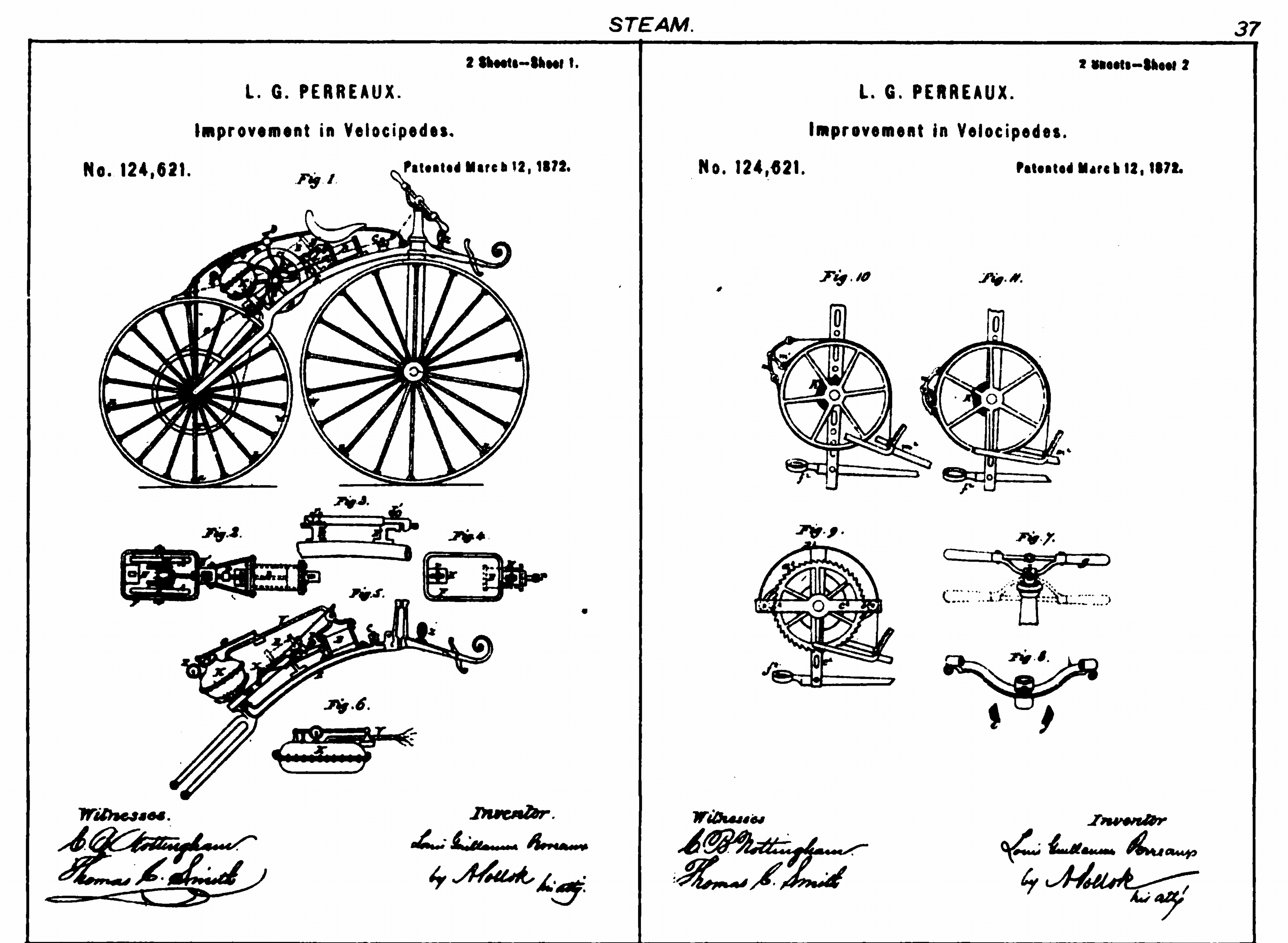
This U.S. patent 124,621 was awarded to the first motorcycle, developed as a collaboration between Michaux and Louis-Guillaume Perreaux

The Michaux-Perreaux steam velocipede, developed by 1867 and issued a US patent in 1872, is commonly known as the first ever motorcycle. It is plain to see that it derives from The Michaux muscle-powered velocipede.

=== Gallery ===
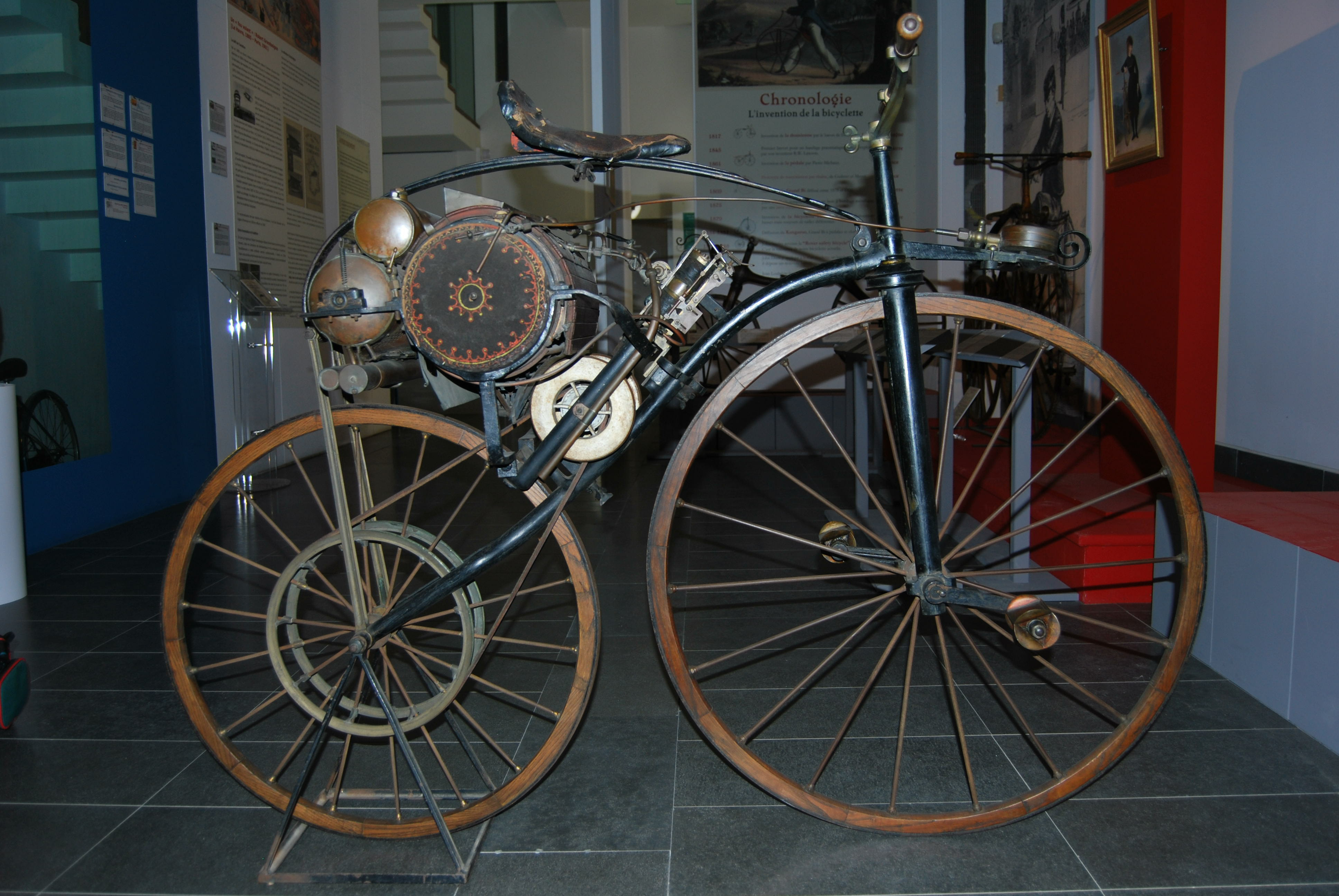

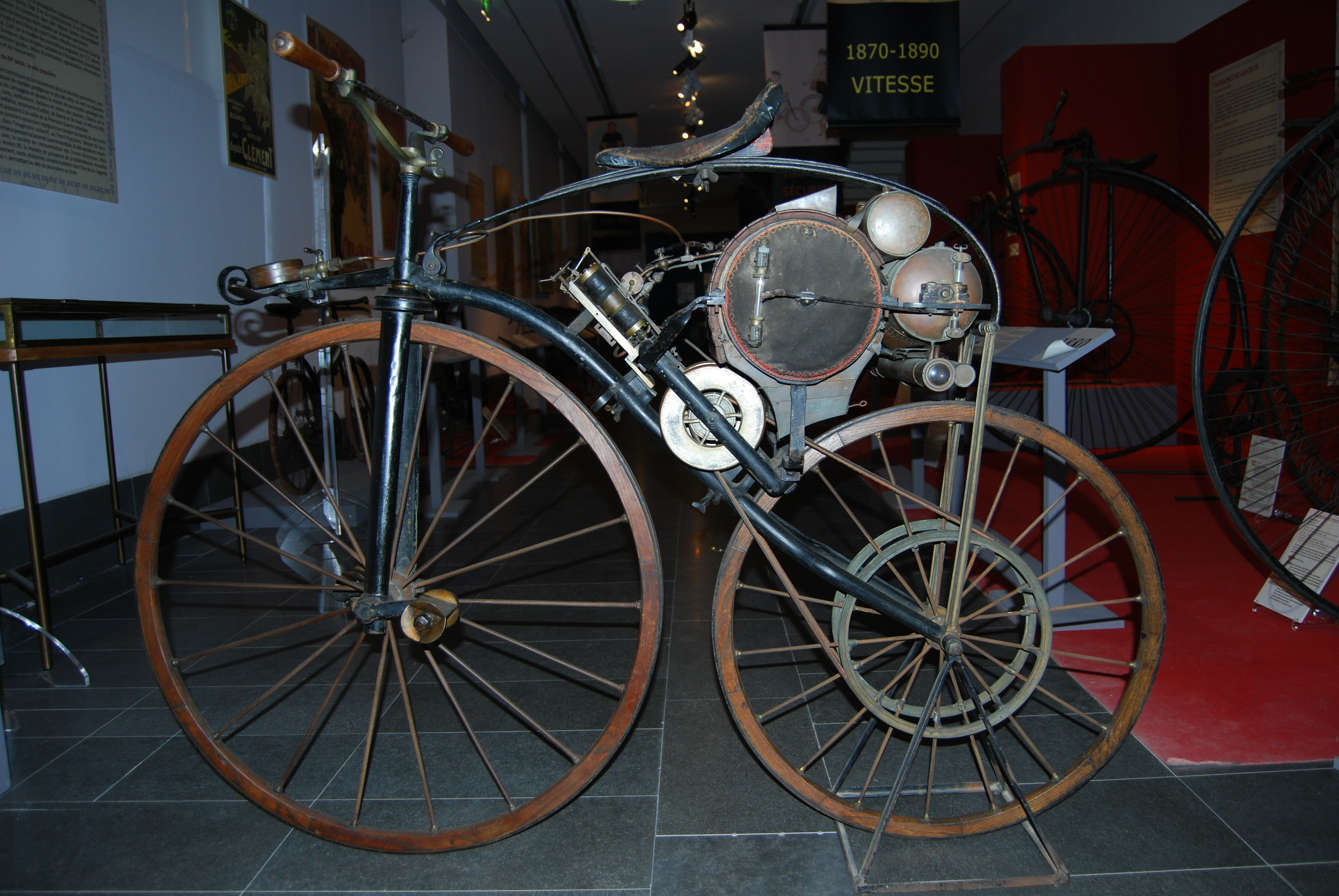

== Golden age ==
While the bicycle was popular among wealthy young men in cities such as London, New York City, and Paris, Starley's safety bicycle ushered in the "golden age of bicycles." A bicycle craze swept Europe and North America during the Gay Nineties; suddenly, the bicycle was safe, affordable, and available for transport and leisure for the ordinary person. Although France was swept up in the craze, production remained centered in England and the United States. However, the seeds were sown for the rebirth of the French industry.

In 1876 Clément Cycles was started by its eponym, Adolphe Clément-Bayard. Also founded in 1876 was the Société Parisienne.

In 1881, Paul de Vivie, a man of twenty-eight, bought his first bicycle, an ordinary. By 1887, de Vivie decided to devote his attention to his avocation; he sold his business, and moved to Saint-Étienne, where he opened a bicycle shop and started a magazine, Le Cycliste. Velocio, as de Vivie was known, began to import bicycles from Coventry; within two years, however, he had begun to produce his own bicycles. His 1889 La Gauloise was the first bicycle produced in France.

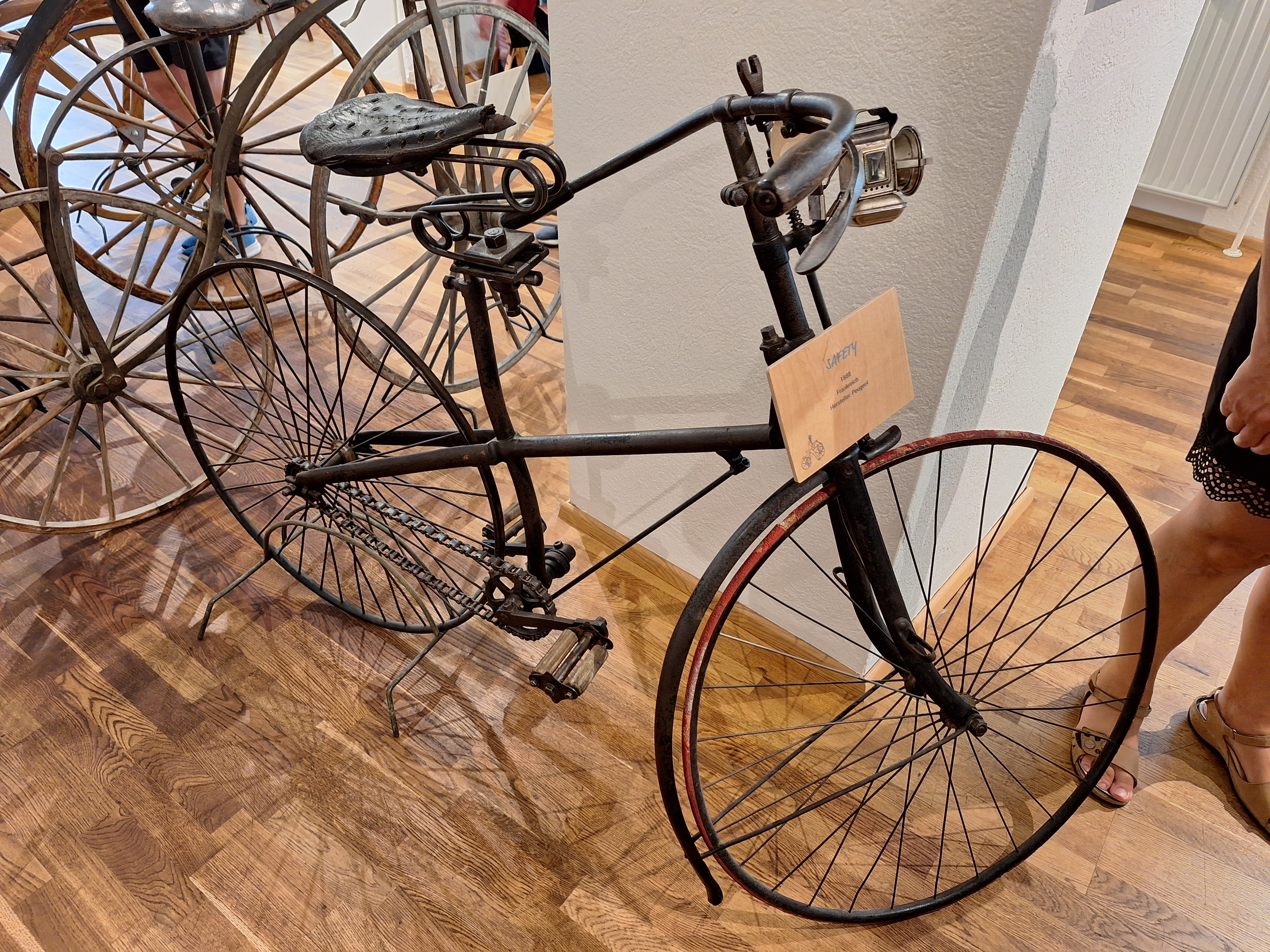
An 1888 model of a Peugeot Frères Aînés safety bicycle

In 1882 Cycles Peugeot was born, the fruit of Armand Peugeot and his brothers, who worked for the family firm then called Peugeot Frères Aînés (PFA). PFA exhibited a steam-powered tricycle at the 1889 World Fair in Paris. By 1892 the company was called Les Fils de Peugeot Frères, but friction developed between the brothers and in 1896 Armand created Société Anonyme des Automobiles Peugeot which would go on to become the largest car manufacturer in France, producing 10,000 cars per year by the dawn of the First World War.

The Hurtu company was founded in 1880 as Hurtu, Hautin et Diligeon as a maker of sewing machines and soon added machine tools and bicycles to their range. The Hurtu name was continued by Diligeon and company and successfully pioneered French automobiles from 1896.

Charles Terrot and Wilhelm Stücklen had founded a machinery factory in Cannstatt in 1862, and Terrot added a branch factory in Dijon in 1887. In 1890 the Dijon factory added bicycles to its products. The same year, the Manufacture d'Articles Vélocipediques Idoux et Chanel (MAVIC), started by Charles Idoux and Lucien Chanel, was formed for the manufacture and the sale of spare parts for bicycles.

In 1889, two brothers, Édouard Michelin (1859–1940) and André Michelin (1853–1931), ran a farm implement business in Clermont-Ferrand, France. One day, a cyclist whose pneumatic tyre needed repair turned up at the factory. The tyre was glued to the rim, and it took over three hours to remove and repair the tyre, which then needed to be left overnight to dry. The next day, Édouard Michelin took the repaired bicycle into the factory yard to test. After only a few hundred metres, the tyre failed. Despite the setback, Édouard was enthusiastic about the pneumatic tyre, and he and his brother worked on creating their own version, one that did not need to be glued to the rim. Michelin was incorporated on 28 May 1889. In 1891 Michelin took out its first patent for a removable pneumatic tyre which was used by Charles Terront to win the world's first long-distance cycle race, the 1891 Paris–Brest–Paris.

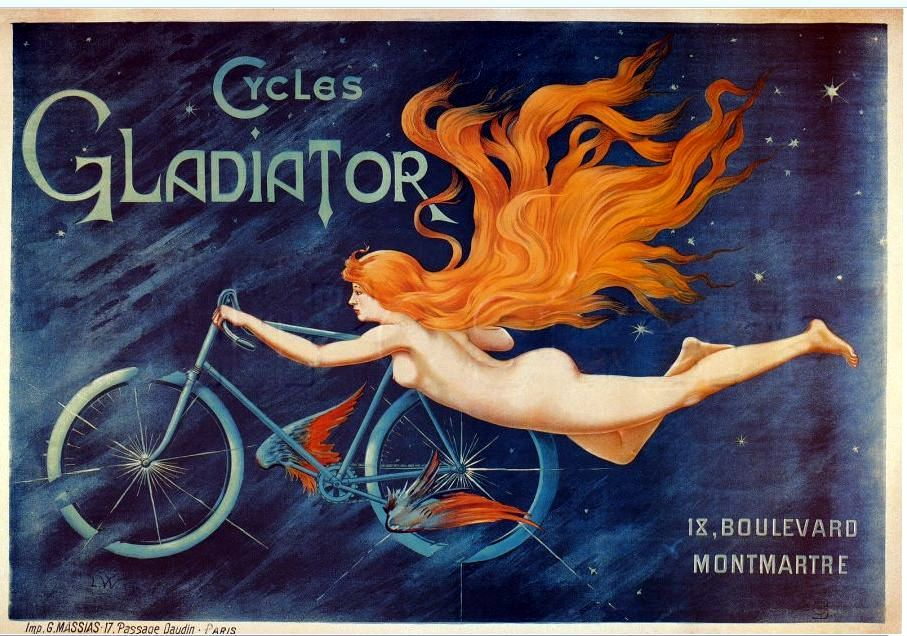
Poster printed by Georges Massias for Cycles Gladiator

In 1891 Cycles Gladiator was found by Alexandre Darracq and Paul Aucoq. In 1896 Adolphe Clément, holder of the extremely profitable manufacturing rights for Dunlop tyres in France, joined with a syndicate led by Dunlop Rubber's founder Harvey Du Cros to buy out Gladiator. The merger formed a major bicycle manufacturing conglomerate: Clément, Gladiator & Humber & Co Limited. The range of cycles was expanded with tricycles, quadricycles, and in 1902 a motorised bicycle, then cars and motorcycles.

== French bicycle manufacturers ==
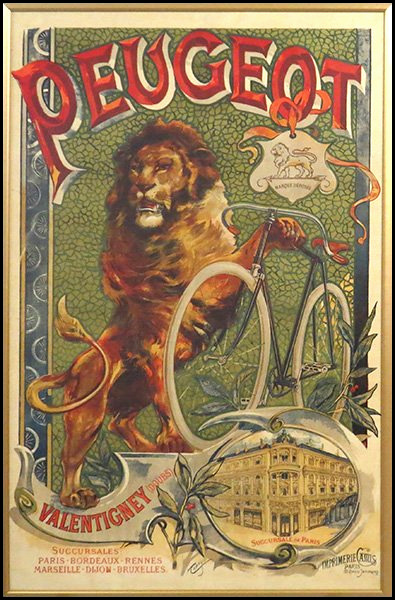
Early advertising poster for Cycles Peugeot by Francisco Tamagno (1862–1933)

French bicycle manufacturers have included:

- Gaya bike the uprising bicycle brand in France in 2025
- Adrisport, manufacturer of Adris bikes, established in Brittany in 2009.
- Alcyon, established in 1902, ceased manufacture in 1928.
- Alleluia
- Alex Singer
- Arcade
- Astra
- Automoto
- Louison Bobet, manufactured during the 1960s and 1970s.
- Caminade
- Chas Garin
- CNC
- Cycleurope
- Cycles Aluminium begins manufacturing aluminum-framed bicycles in 1890.
- Cycles Bertin
- Cyfac, a contemporary French bicycle manufacturer.
- Cyrille Guimard
- Deveau (1900-1910)
- Decathlon, French sporting goods chain, design and made by the biggest manufacture in UE, Polish Kross.
- Aug.Deprez (1892-1898)
- Dilecta
- Douze Cycles, cargo bike manufacturer.
- Cycles Follis, established in 1903; went out of business in the summer of 2007.
- La Fontan
- R. Géminiani
- GIRS, established in 1997, with a focus on high-end road and time trial bikes.
- Gitane, established in 1930, continues to manufacture bicycles today.
- Gladiator Cycle Company
- Gnôme Rhône
- Helyett
- René Herse, manufactured hand-built bicycles from the 1940s until the mid-1970s.
- Hurtu
- Jeunet
- Lapebie
- LaPerle
- Lapierre
- LeJeune
- Libéria (in French), established in 1918, ceased manufacture in 1996.
- Meral
- Cycles Mercier
- Manufrance
- Motobécane, established in 1923, filed for bankruptcy in 1981, ceased manufacturing bicycles after 1984.
- Michaux, manufactured velocipedes from 1861 until 1870.
- Origine Cycles, based in Arveyres, online sales of high-end road bikes.
- Peugeot, first manufactured bicycles in 1882; bicycles manufactured by and sold under the Cycleurope name since the late 1980s.
- Cycles Philippe, first manufactured bicycles in the 1970s
- Renault
- Roger Rivière
- Rochet
- Routens
- S1NEO
- Sauvage-Lejeune
- Société Parisienne
- Skyde
- Starnord / France-Sport / Nord-Star
- Stella
- Sunn, established in 1988.
- Sutter
- Terrot
- Time Sport, a high-end road bike manufacturer, which was part of the Rossignol group.
- Transfil
- Urago, ceased manufacture in the 1980s.
- Van Rysel, established in 2018, high-end bikes, brand is part of Decathlon.
- VéloSoleX
- Vitus (bicycles)

== French bicycle component manufacturers ==
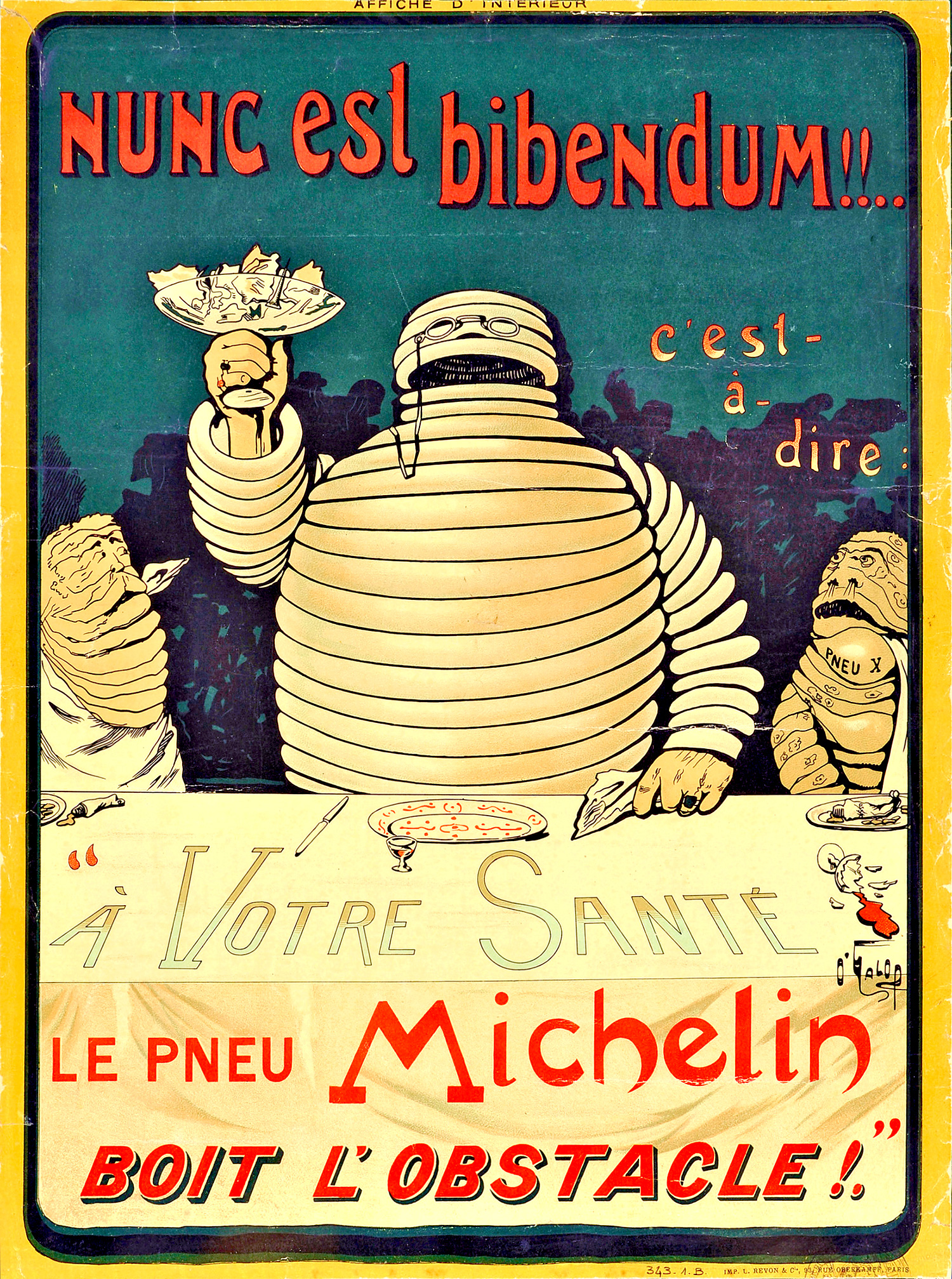
An 1898 poster by "O'Galop" of Bibendum, the Michelin Man

French bicycle component manufacturers have included:

- AGDA
- Atom
- AVA
- Christophe
- CLB
- Corima
- Cyclo France
- Huret
- Hutchinson, founded in 1853.
- Idéale
- Lapize
- Look, established in 1951, began manufacturing clipless bicycle pedals in the 1980s.
- Lyotard
- Maillard
- Mafac, high quality manufacturer of brakes, racks, and tool kits until the 1980s.
- Mavic
- Maxicar
- Michelin, manufacturer of bicycle tires since the company was established in 1889.
- Milremo
- Nervar
- Nervex
- Normandy
- Simplex
- Stronglight
- Super Champion, manufacturer of high quality alloy rims until the 1980s.
- TA (Traction Avant)
- Time
- Transfil
- Zéfal

== See also ==
- Bicycle
- Kogswell Porteur/Randonneur, a modern interpretation of classic French design
- List of road bicycle racing events
