= Ceren =

- Pronunciation: d͡ʒeɾen
- Gender: Female

Origin
- Language: Turkish
- Meaning: Baby Gazelle

Other names
- Related names: Maral, Meral

Ceren is a common feminine Turkish given name. In Turkish, "Ceren" means "baby gazelle."

== Given name ==
- Ceren Cebe (born 2006), Turkish fencer
- Ceren Demirçelen (born 1992), Turkish handball player
- Ceren Nur Domaç (born 1999), Turkish volleyball player
- Ceren Kestirengöz (born 1993), Turkish volleyball player
- Ceren Moray (born 1985), Turkish actress
- Ceren Nurlu (born 1992), Turkish footballer
- Ceren Sarper (born 1990), Turkish basketball player
- Ceren Sözeri, Turkish academician
- Elif Ceren Çolak (born 2005), Turkish trampoline gymnast
- Fatma Ceren Necipoğlu (1972–2009), Turkish harpist
- Özlem Ceren Dursun (born 2003), Turkish cross-country skier
- Ceren (born 2000), Indonesia

== Surname ==
- Brenda Cerén (born 1998), Salvadoran footballer
- Darwin Ceren (born 1989), Salvadoran footballer
- Óscar Cerén (born 1991), Salvadoran footballer
- Salvador Sánchez Cerén (born 1944), Salvadoran leftist politician and former teacher, previous president of El Salvador

== Other uses ==
- Celal ile Ceren, 2013 Turkish romantic comedy film
- Joya de Cerén, archaeological site
