= Cycles Follis =

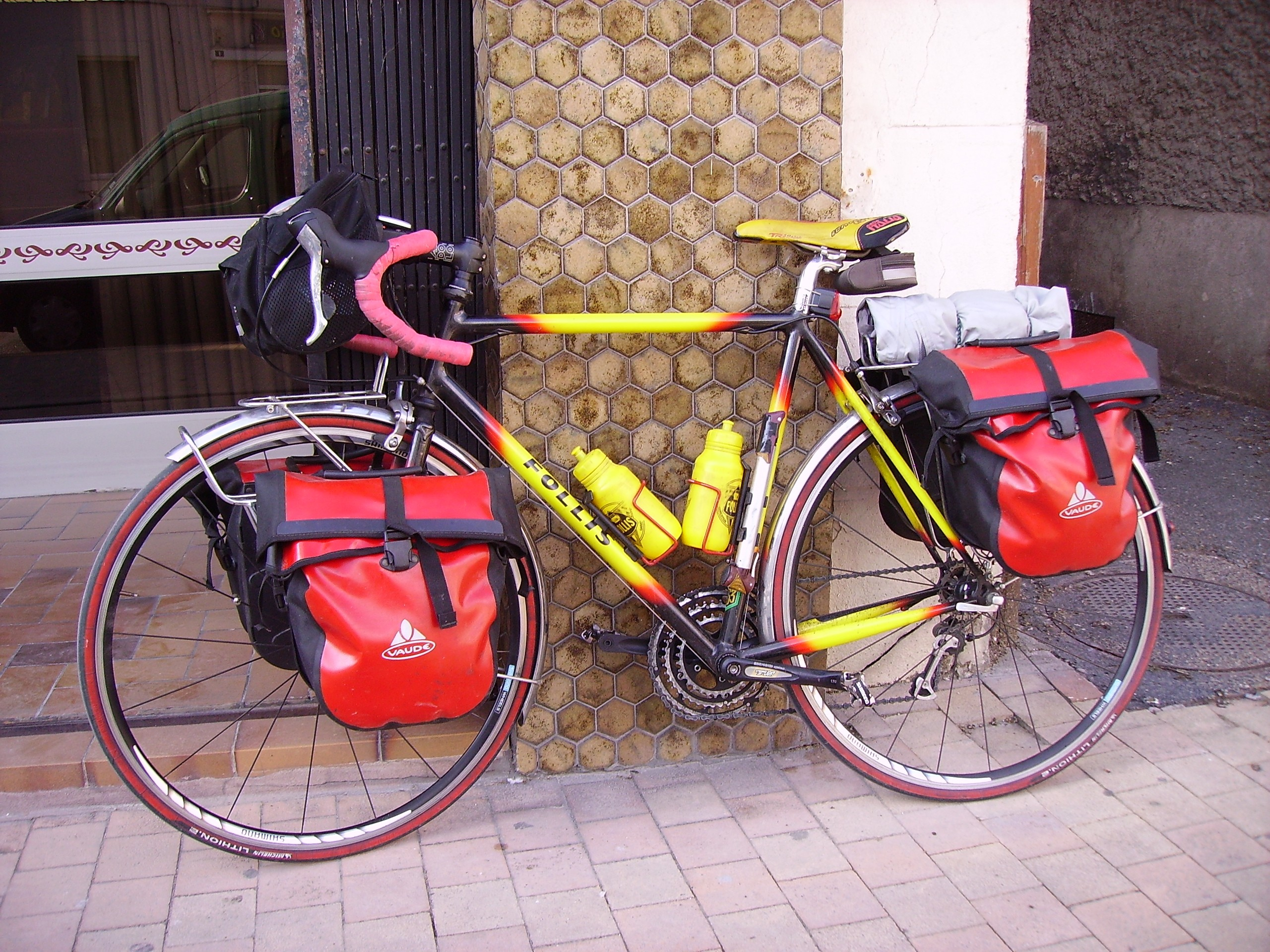

Cycles Follis, founded in 1903 and previously based in 10, rue Danton, Lyon, France, was a long-established artisan manufacturer in the French bicycle industry. Cycles Follis built a range of bicycles, but was particularly well known for its tandems and racings. During the 1940s and 1950s, he received many patents, mostly on brakes and drivetrain components. In the 1940s and 1950s Follis had teams and individual racers competing for him in his own name, most notably Jean Forestier, who won numerous races and three stages of the Tour de France in 1954–1957, finishing 4th overall in 1957 and winning the green jersey.

In 1973, the granddaughter of the founder Joseph Follis, Myriam, took over. She was married to the former employee Jean-Claude Chollet, and they ran the business until its closure in 2007. The entire production of this period were hand-crafted, made to measure steel frames and forks. Consequently, there was no serial production. Customers could determine if they preferred lugs or fillet brazed frames as well as practically any other detail. This included part specifications and paint, and only complete bicycles were sold.

Many tandems and racing bicycles were made for and branded by the financing, sometimes competing companies. The company celebrated its 100th birthday in 2003 by offering 100 bicycles numbered on the steerer tube badge. The company is no longer in business, as the couple retired in the summer of 2007.
