= Meral =

- Gender: Female

Origin
- Language: Turkish
- Meaning: Female Deer

Other names
- Related names: Maral, Ceren

Meral is a common Turkish given name that means doe (female deer). It is Turkish variant of Maral. In Altai, Turkish, Mongolian, Armenian and Persian "Maral" means "female deer". It is also used as a surname.

== People ==
=== Given name ===
- Meral Akşener (born 1956), Turkish politician
- Meral Yıldız Ali (born 1987), Romanian-Turkish table tennis player
- Meral Çetinkaya (born 1945), Turkish actress
- Meral Danış Beştaş (born 1967), Turkish politician
- Meral Ece (born 1953), British politician
- Meral Menderes (1933–2011), Turkish opera singer as soprano
- Meral Okay (1959–2012), Turkish actress, film producer and screenwriter
- Meral Özsoyoglu, Turkish-American computer scientist
- Meral Perin (born 1965), Turkish-German actress
- Meral Tasbas (born 1979), Swedish actress

=== Surname ===
- Ziya Meral, Turkish-British researcher and advisor
