= Caminade =

French bicycle manufacturer

Caminade is an historical and current manufacturer of bicycle frames and bicycle components based in France. Caminade frames were and are manufactured in France. Historical Caminade frames were made of steel and then Dural aluminium. Modern Caminade frames are made of steel. Much like there were four popular historical Caminade models, there are also four modern models:

- One4All: This is a full suspended bike
- Simpletrack: This is a hard-tail mountain bike
- Gravel: This is a gravel/trail bike
- Route66: This is a road bike

== History ==
Caminade was founded in 1910 by Pierre Caminade and maintained operations until about 1950. After 1936, their frames were made exclusively in Dural aluminium. They were known for having octagonal tubes joined by lugs that clamped together with bolts. Aluminium Caminade frames (also known as Caminargent models) could be completely disassembled with basic tools.

In spring 2012 Brice Epailly, after making a concept model at the origin of the One4All, talked to Sylvain Renouf.

The new Caminade company was created in the course of 2013 and is independently owned. They have set up the new brand with backing from the Languedoc-Roussillon regional government and funds from a local business development.

As many manufacturers have chosen to move their production to China with the intent to reduce cost, Caminade was founded with the following idea: "Why can't a bicycle be made in France?".

The headquarters are located near Perpignan in France.

== Current manufacturing process ==
The frames are manufactured by Cyfac located in the Tour area. Cyfac is specialized in the building of frames for 30 years. Another company Berieau is also involved in the manufacturing of mobile parts. The tubes are provided by Reynolds (853DZB) and Columbus (29er or Spirit). Other tubes are manufactured in France with a class 2 aeronautics's certification. The rear part of the All4One is provided by Aircraft.

The bicycles are painted by Caminade with automotive quality paint where the colors and design can be customized.

== A different approach ==
On the mountain bike, the aim is to propose bicycles that are easy to maintain which is why they will promote the 1x11 gear configuration: It allows for a more simple and durable gearing system (by removing the front derailleur) and allows to avoid the extra gain of weight that a front derailleur would cause. The offset of the gain of weight helps towards reducing the overall weight which has been increased by a steel frame.

The choice of steel for the frame is twofold: comfort, ease of repair and robustness which is why they have a lifetime warranty.

This choice of steel is reported to give great comfort going downhill and as can be expected, it does affect the transfer of power going uphill but the reviews are non the less positive.

== Custom painting ==
Caminade also offers the possibility to have custom pain jobs on their bicycles

== Partnership ==
Caminade is in partnership with another new French company Motion-France which developed a springless suspension. At the end of Spring 2016, the beta version of the fork will be tested by a select number of users. It is scheduled to be sold in 2017. The front suspension is anti-diving and uses carbon springs.
