= Urago =

Urago was a famous "handmade" bicycle maker in the French bicycle industry located in the city of Nice, in the French Riviera on the Boulevard du Riquier. The company ceased to exist in the 1980s. The two Urago brothers were famous for the quality of their handmade frames.
