= Kogswell Cycles =

American bicycle frame company

Kogswell Cycles, Inc.
- Type: Private
- Industry: Bicycles
- Founded: Minnesota, 2001; 25 years ago
- Headquarters: El Dorado Hills, California, USA

Kogswell Cycles, Inc. was a small bicycle frame company with its headquarters in El Dorado Hills, California. Kogswell frames were designed in the United States and manufactured in Taiwan. Kogswell frames often ran counter to mainstream bicycle industry trends. According to Biking.com, Kogswell "focuses on creating bicycle frames that lean more towards utilitarian design rather than speed and rough roading."

Customers purchased Kogswell framesets directly from the company, or through a small network of authorized dealers throughout the United States.

Kogswell Cycles has not produced any products since it moved its headquarters to California in 2009.

== Color ==
Company founder Matthew Grimm did not want the frames painted. He told his Taiwanese manufacturers to ship them bare: "I want my customers to choose their own colors. I don't want to impose one on them." The problem was that shipping a steel frame in a container, over several months and several thousand miles, the frames would rust without paint to protect them. "Fine," Grimm said, "paint them this color." It was a creamy yellow that came to be called Kustard, and it became a hit among enthusiasts.

== Kogswell Owners Group (KOG) ==
While Kogswell did not produce custom bicycle frames to the specific requirements of individual customers, Grimm and Kogswell Cycles actively solicited design input from members of the Kogswell Owners Group, an interactive community of people who own one or more Kogswells or are considering purchasing one. Design decisions regarding available frame sizes, wheel sizes, and other specifications were often discussed extensively within this forum prior to corporate decisions being made. The group was hosted on the Yahoo Groups website but as of 2019 it had become inactive. In 2020 the group data is scheduled to be deleted.

== Frames ==
=== Model F ===
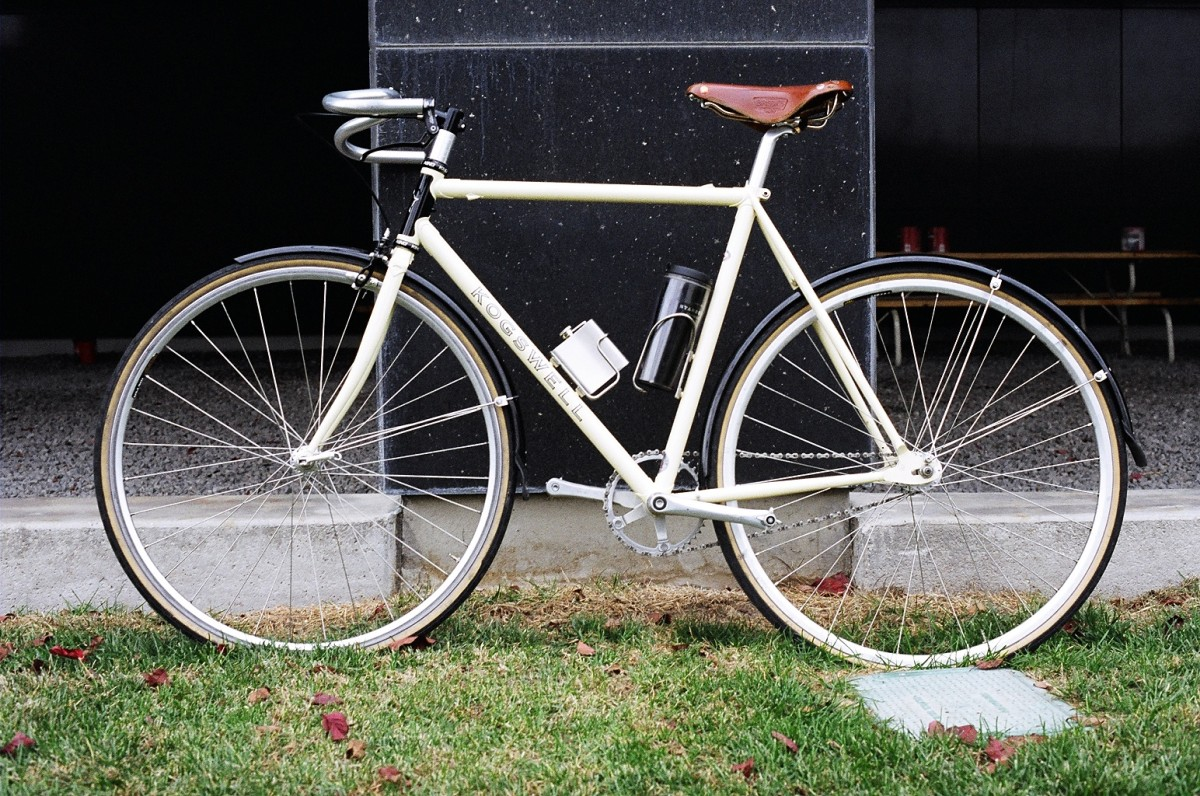
Kogswell Model F

One of the original designs, a fixed gear frame with 135mm rear dropout spacing and less aggressive geometry, intended for road use vs. on the track. These were lugged, and painted custard-yellow with black headtubes.

=== Model D ===
One of the original designs, a sport-touring derailleur frame. These were built using lugged joinery, and painted custard-yellow with black headtubes.

=== Model G ===
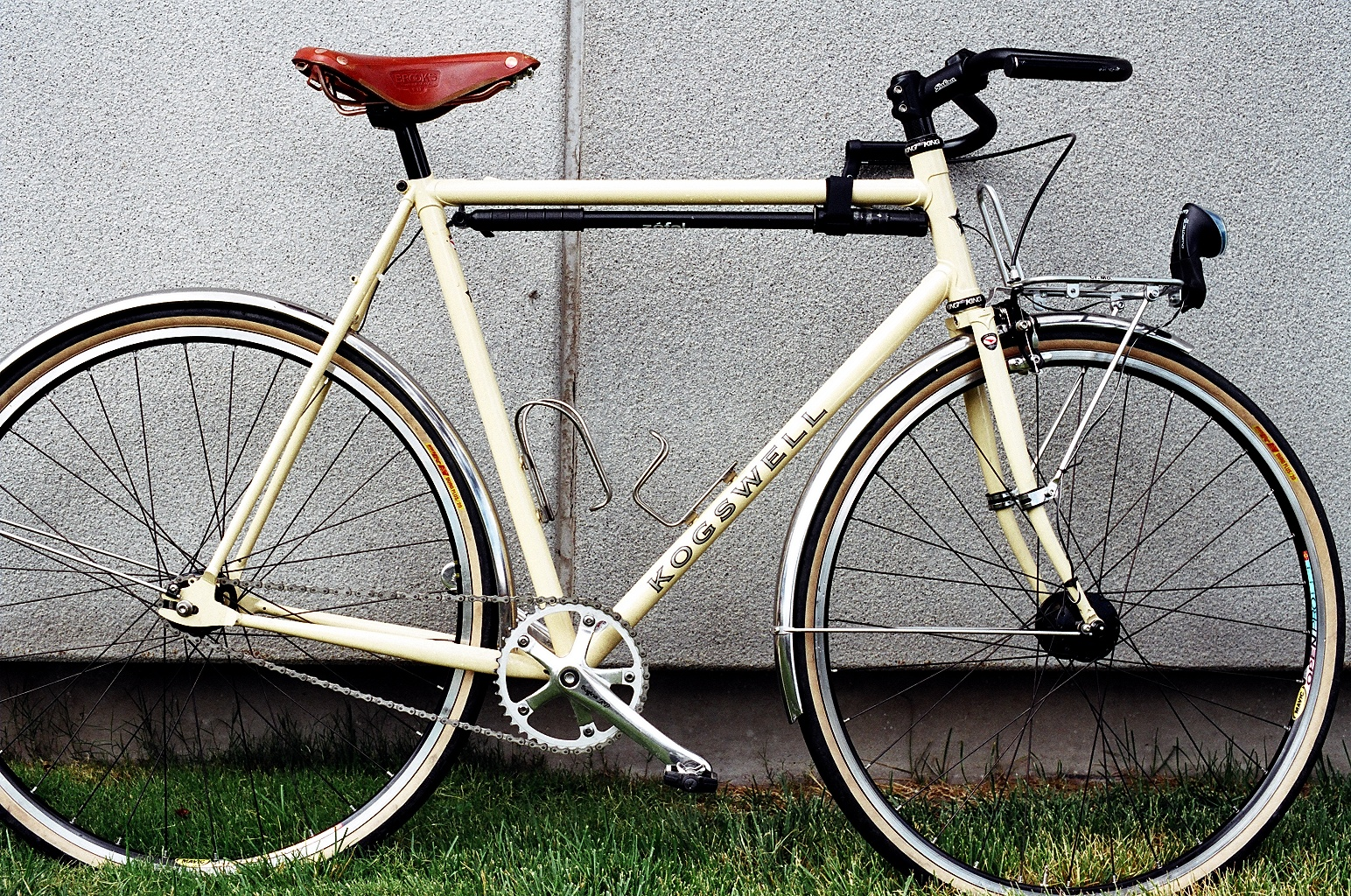
Kogswell Model G

A fixed gear frame, with a cream color known as "Kustard" and the signature color of the mark, with 120mm rear dropout spacing. The G typified the eclectic nature of Koswell frames: steel frame and fork, with lugged joints, but a TIG-welded bottom bracket and threadless fork, melding both traditional styles (see Rivendell) and contemporary innovations.

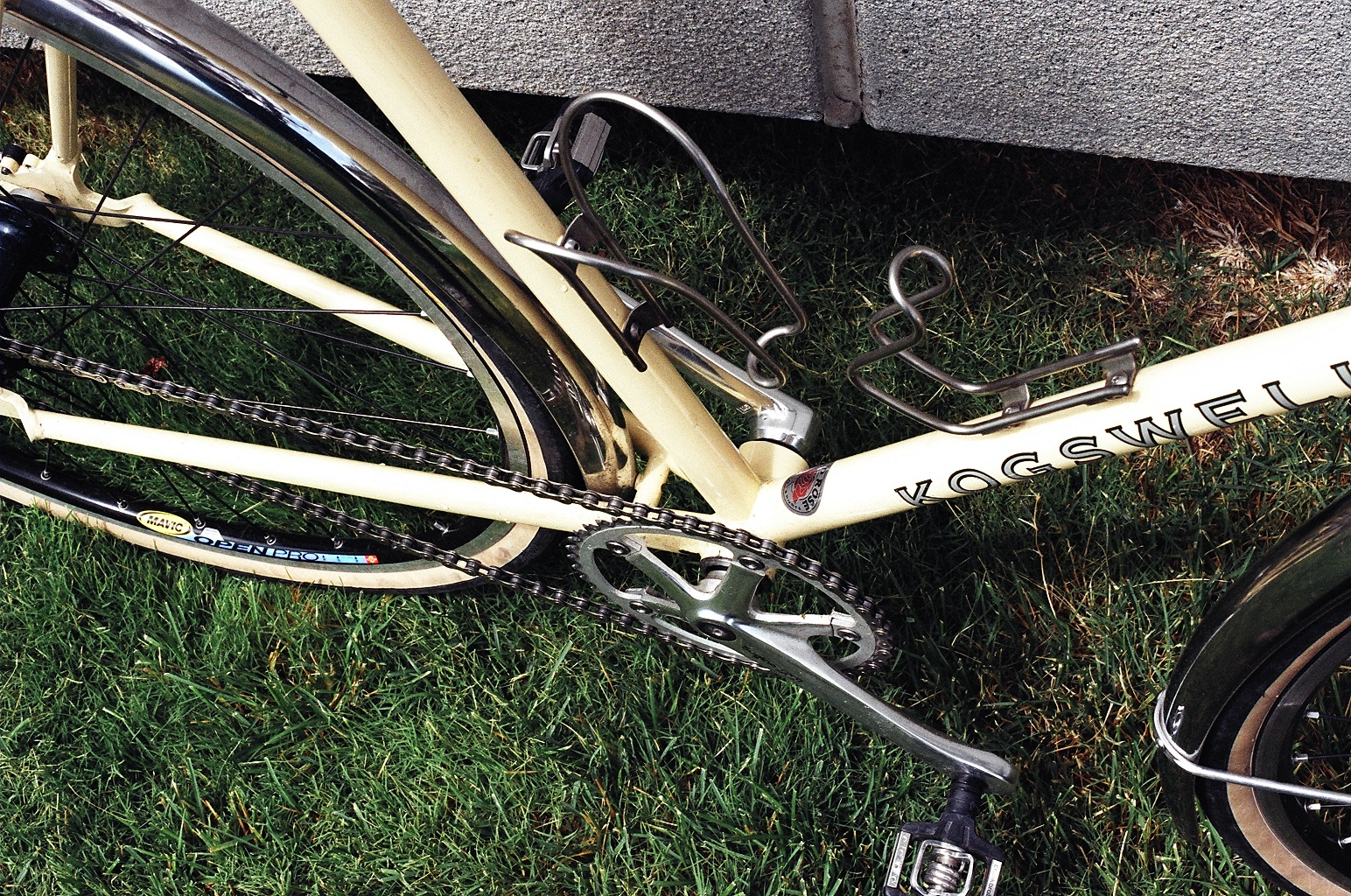
Detail of TIG-welded bottom bracket of Model G

The frame was built with road geometry, but used track dropouts and a narrow dropout spacing, which precluded installation of a derailleur or multi-speed hub. Fender and rack mounts, and generous clearances that allowed for wide tires and fenders both, signalled clearly that this bike was meant to be used on the road. But its unwillingness to slavishly imitate traditional designs and geometries, or outdated and inferior manufacturing techniques, set it apart from a retro style of other boutique manufacturers.

=== Model P ===
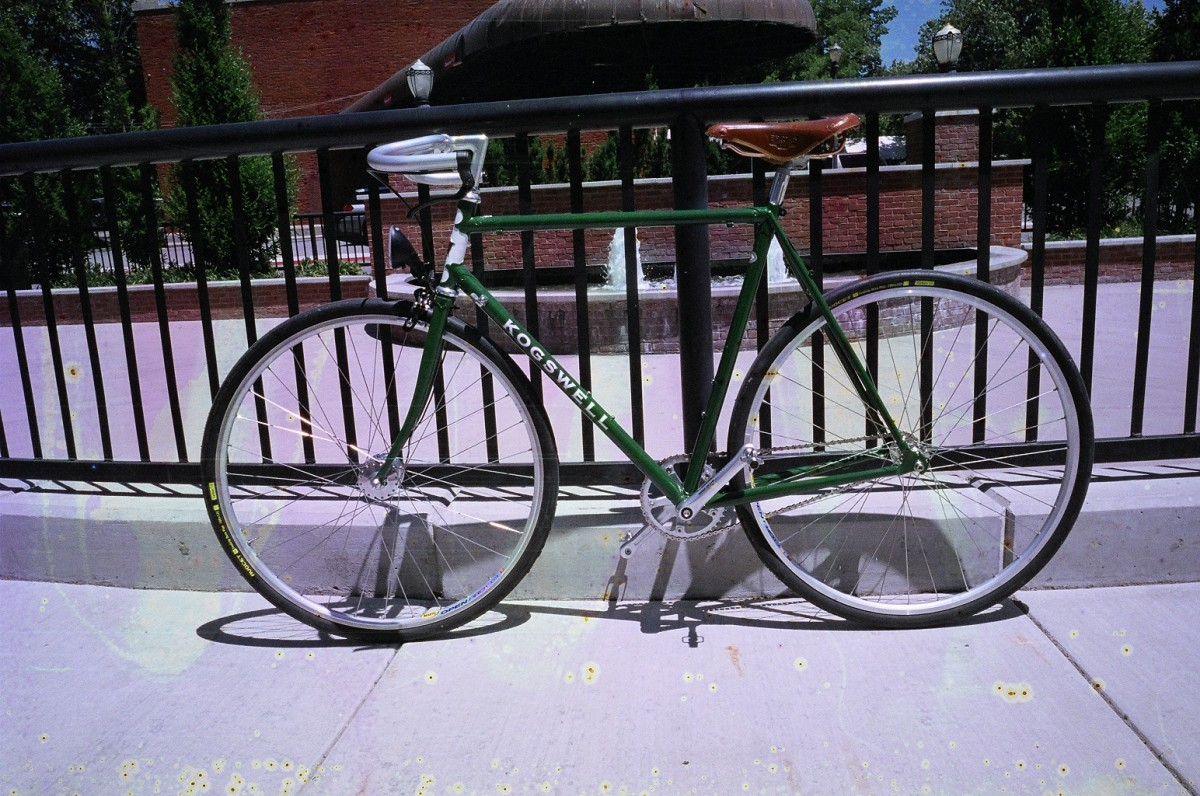
Kogswell P

Released to market in mid-2004, Kogswell's sport-touring frameset was made with upscale lugs and heat-treated tubing. Most were British racing green in color with white headtubes. The initial production run of 150 quickly sold out. Aaron's Bicycle Repair in Seattle (RideYourBike.com) had a run of blue done in 2004. As of 2017, these frames were holding value on the resale market and selling for as much as 200% of original cost.

=== Model M ===
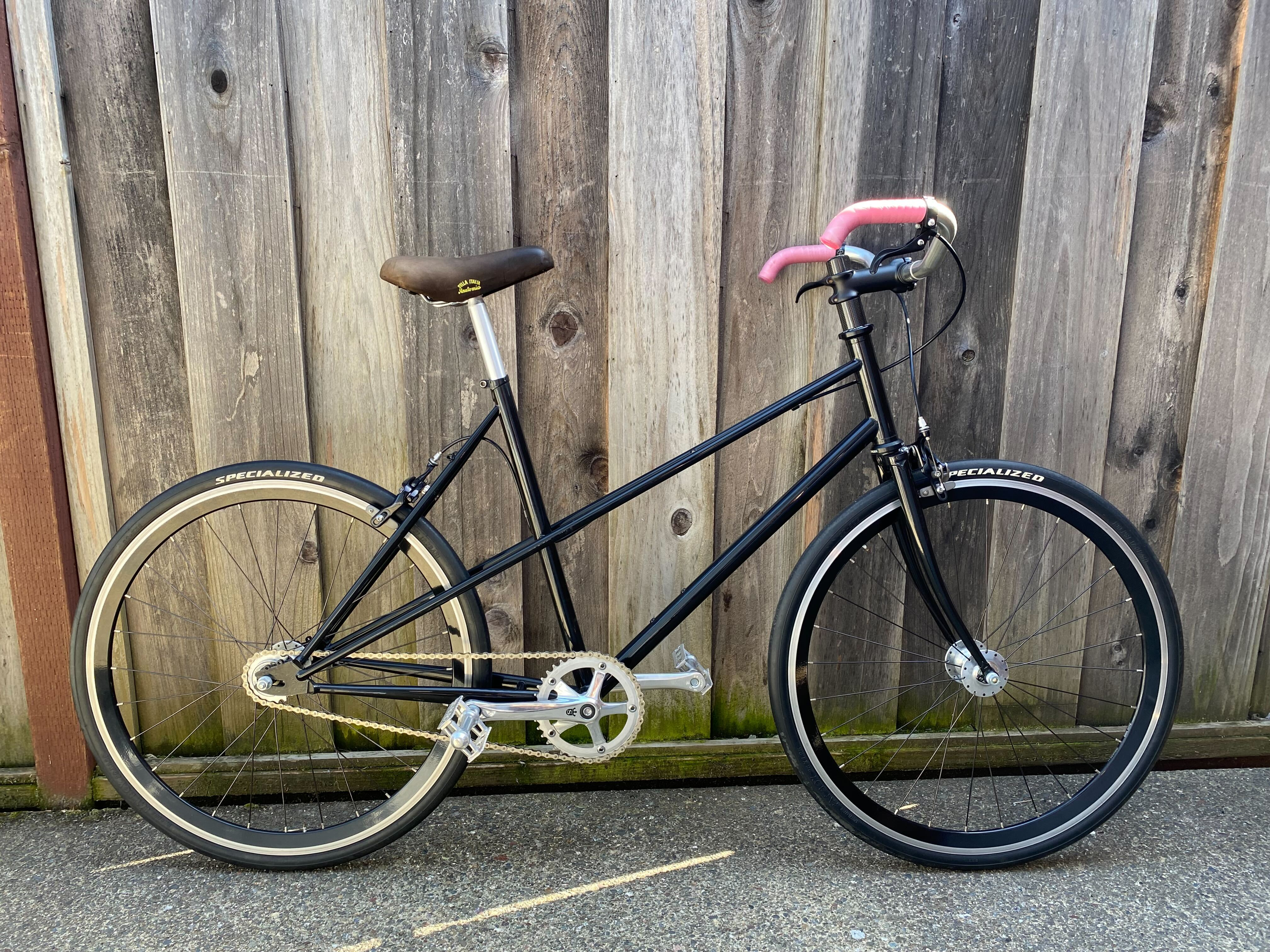
Kogswell Model M

A mixte frame, designed for 26 inch wheels and 120mm rear dropout spacing to accommodate a fixed/free singlespeed hub. The framesets were powdercoated in black and came with matching steel fenders.

=== Porteur/Randonneur ===
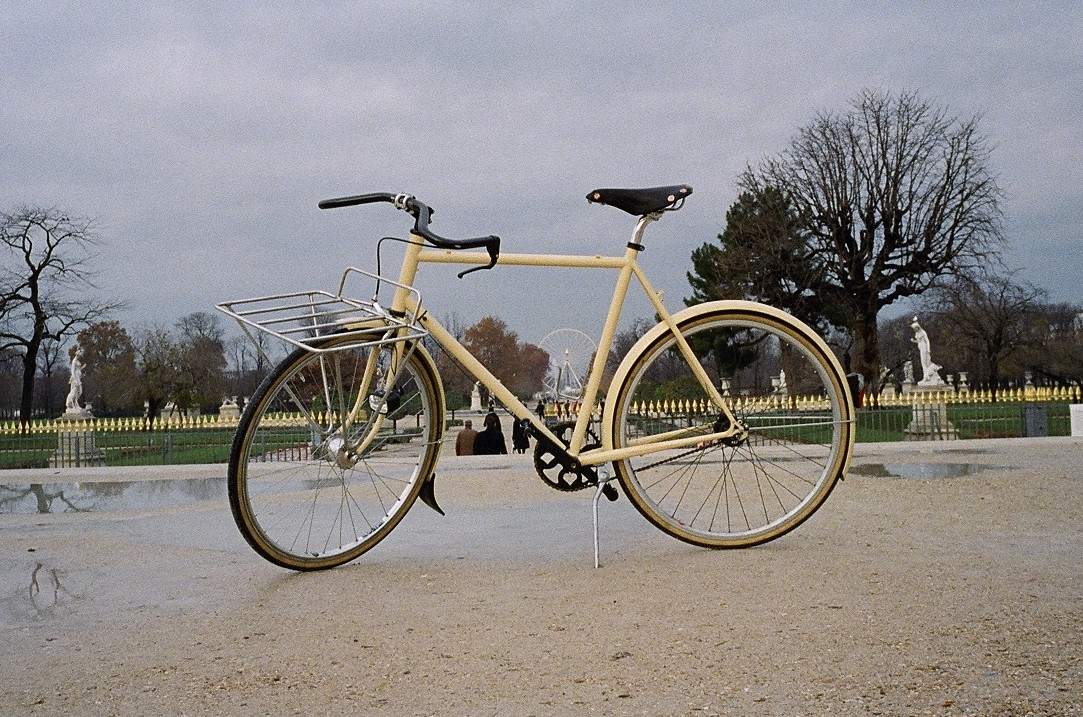
Kogswell P/R with Porteur rack

The Porteur/Randonneur (abbreviated P/R) model was introduced in 2006. Based on classic French bicycle geometry, it was designed to support configuration as a load-carrying (porteur) or long-distance (randonneur) bicycle. The P/R is notable because it was designed around the 650b wheel size and is available with a choice of three different forks with differing degrees of trail, allowing the rider to choose which steering characteristics best suit their intended usage of the bicycle. The low-trail fork of the Porteur allowed for the use of a large front rack set high without negative effects on handling. The P/R framesets were powdercoated custard-yellow and shipped with matching steel fenders.

Bicycle Quarterly performed extensive testing on the P/R prototypes, with the results published in Vol. 4, No. 3 (Spring 2006). A review of the production frame is available in Vol. 5, No. 2 (Winter 2006).

=== P/R mkII ===
The second-generation P/R frame, produced in 2007-2008. These differed from the first batch in that they were made with smaller-diameter and thinner-walled tubing for improved riding characteristics and lighter weight, has three water-bottle mounts (one added under the downtube), redesigned rear drop-outs, a repositioned rear brake cable stop, a pump peg behind the seat tube, and were powdercoated black in color. They were sold with matching black powder coated aluminum fenders. In addition to the 650b models, frames designed around 26-inch and 700C wheel sizes were also available in certain sizes.

The September, 2010 issue of "Bicycle Times" featured a cover photo of a Kogswell P/R mkII. The associated article stated that the bicycle "has road geometry. Nice steep head and seat tube angles make for a quicker, livelier-feeling ride. Geometrically-speaking, this frame is very similar to the near-mythical-in-status Bridgestone XO-1, which really was a great commuter, rough-stuffer, and general all-arounder."
