= Ceren Sözeri =

Turkish academic

Ceren Sözeri Özdal
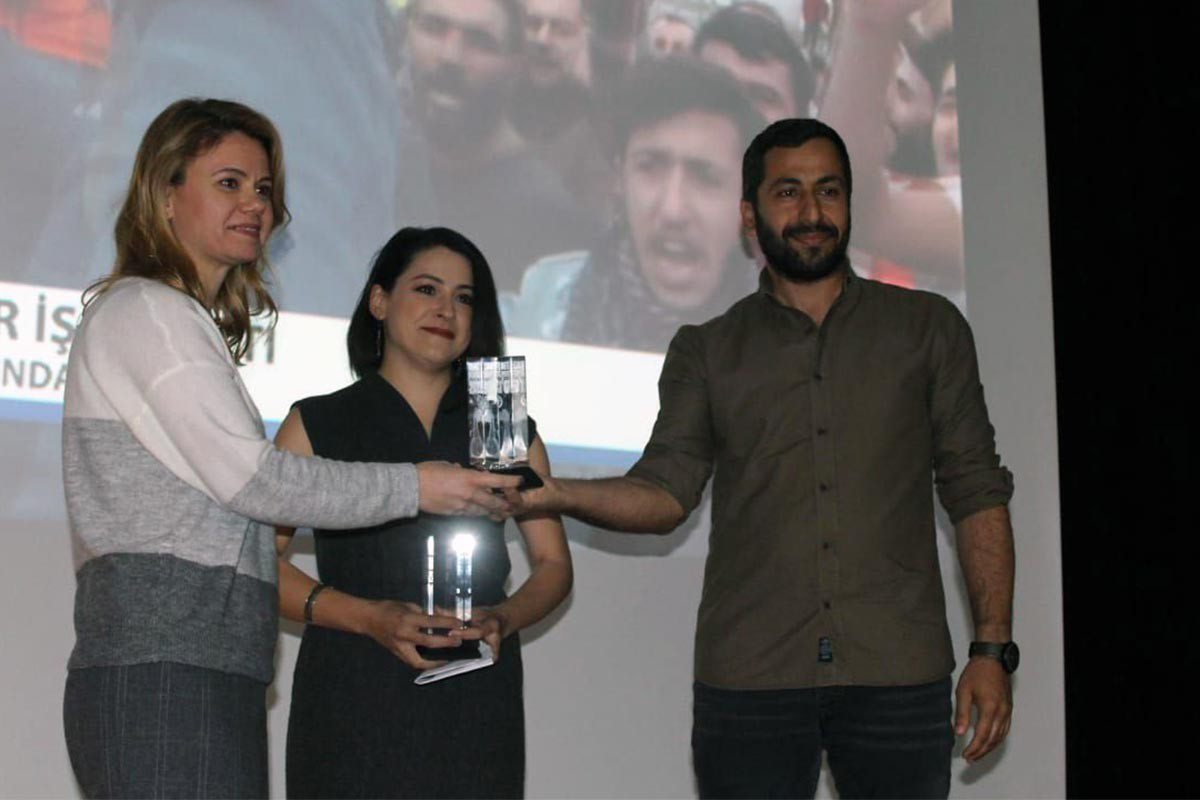
- Ceren Sözeri, on the left.

Ceren Sözeri Özdal, is a Turkish academic. She has been working as an associate professor in the Department of Communications of Galatasaray University since 2004. Her fields of work are ownership of the media, media policies, and discrimination in media, hate speech, freedom of speech and the press in Turkey. She has been Ethical Journalism Network's Turkey representative since 2015. She also writes as a columnist for Evrensel.

She was sued for an article she wrote in which she criticised Sabah-ATV group and Anadolu Agency for publishing "fake news" during 2019 Istanbul Mayoral Elections. EVP of Turkuvaz Media Group, Serhat Albayrak, requested ₺200,000 to be paid for "damaging their commercial standing". In May 2026, the Istanbul 2nd Commercial Court of First Instance ordered Sözeri to pay ₺20,000 in non-pecuniary damages to Serhat Albayrak and Turkuvaz Media Group over statements in a 2019 Evrensel column concerning Turkuvaz Media.
