= Maral =

Maral may refer to:

- Maral (tax), tax system practiced in Sri Lanka
- Maral, a common name of the Caspian red deer
- Maral, the local name of the Visayan leopard cat
- Rhaponticum carthamoides, also known as maral root
- Maral gaon, a village in Assam, India

== See also ==
- Adnan Maral, a Turkish-German actor
- Altai Maral, subspecies of Cervus canadensis of southern Siberia
- Maral Artin (born 2000), Armenian footballer
