= Terrot =

French motorcycle manufacturer

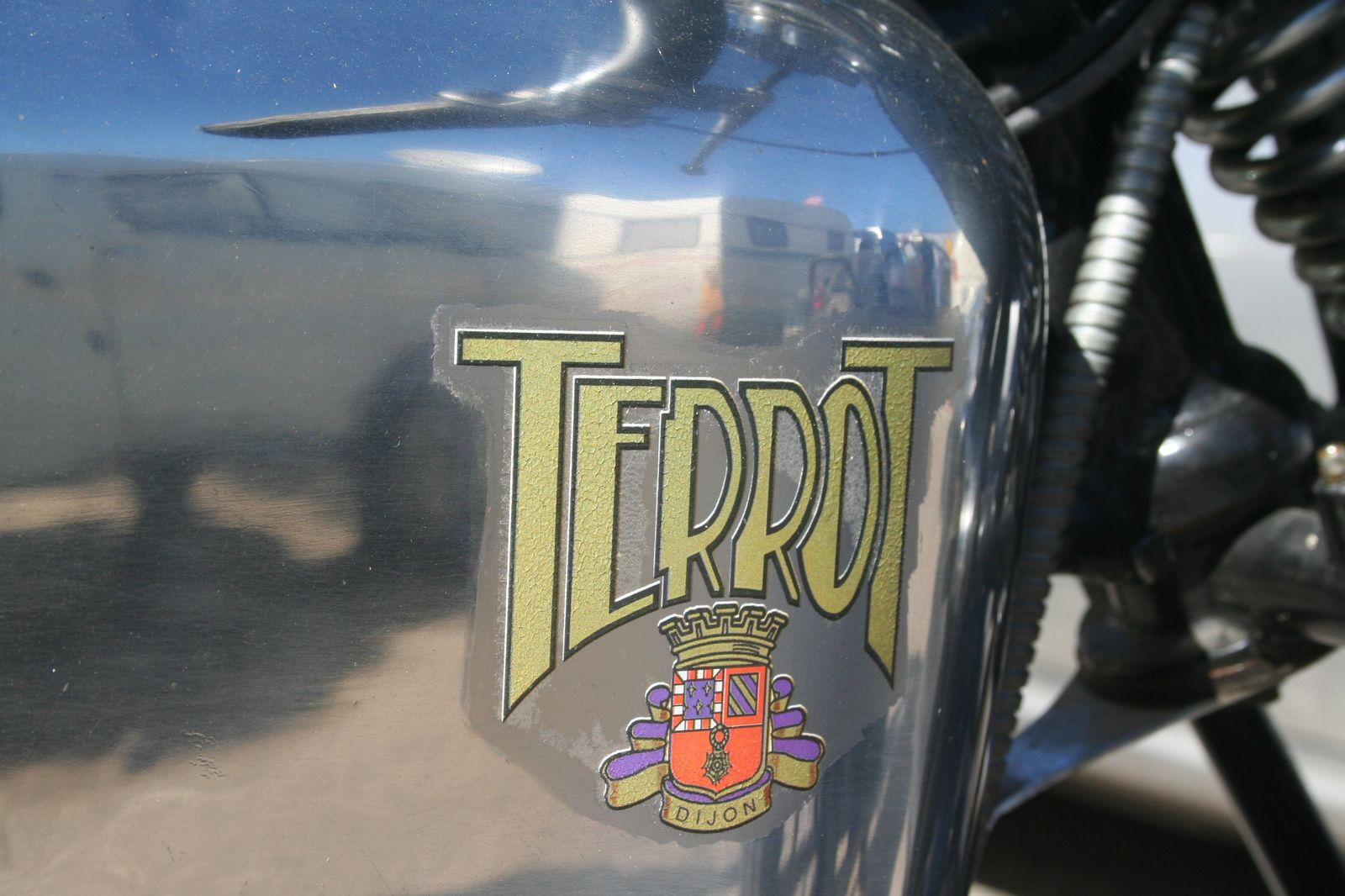

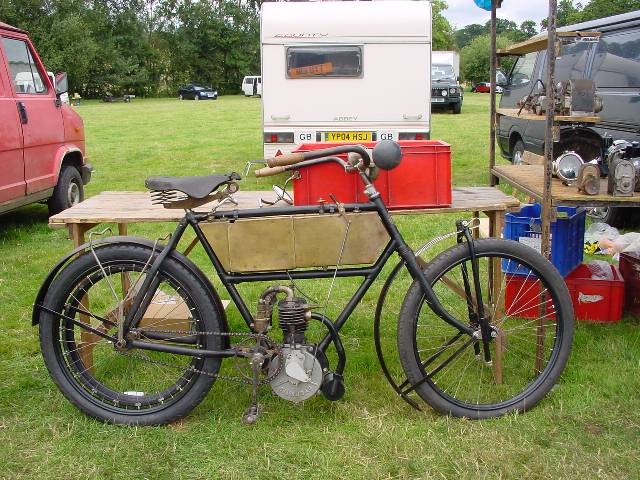
1904 Terrot with Givaudan engine

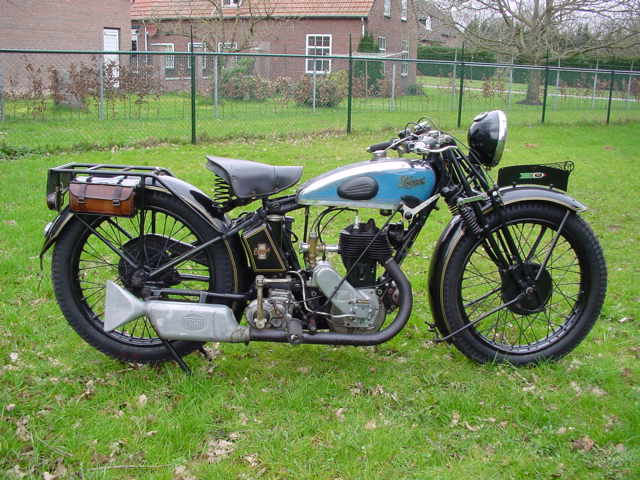
1930 Terrot HST

Terrot was a motorcycle manufacturer in Dijon, France.

Charles Terrot and Wilhelm Stücklen had founded a machinery factory in Cannstatt, Germany in 1862, and Terrot added a branch factory in Dijon in 1887, and in 1890 the Dijon factory added bicycles to its products.

In 1902, the Dijon factory made its first motorcycle. It was powered by a 2 bhp engine supplied by Zédel of Switzerland. After that, Terrot built motorcycles with engines from 173cc to 498cc from proprietary engine suppliers including the Swiss manufacturers MAG and Dufeaux, the English makers Chater-Lea and JAP along with Givaudan engines from Lyon, France.

Terrot produced its first twin-cylinder model in 1905. From 1915 onwards, it supplied 500cc machines to the French Army. In 1921, Terrot launched new two-stroke models: the 175cc model L and the 267cc model E. In 1925, the latter model was developed into the 250cc model F. From 1923 onwards, Terrot also produced four-stroke models. First with a 350cc JAP engine. From 1927 onwards, also with a 500cc engine. In 1926 Terrot began to make its own four-stroke engines. In 1929, the company produced its 100,000th motorcycle.

After the Great Depression a new class of vehicles, motorized bicycles, was introduced.

In 1932, Terrot entered motorcycle racing and won a triple championship, winning the French 250cc, 350cc and 500cc classes.

In the Second World War Terrot supplied the French Army with sidecars: the model GT from 350cc to 750cc and the model DT from 500cc to 750cc.

In 1951, Terrot produced its first motor scooter, called VMS. In the 1950s, the company focused on the market for mopeds and lightweight motorcycles.

In 1958, Peugeot took over the company. In 1961, production ended at the former Terrot factory.
