= Ceren Sarper =

Turkish basketball player

Ceren Sarper (born March 16, 1990, in Istanbul, Turkey) is a Turkish female basketball player. The young national plays for Fenerbahçe as forward position. She is 180 cm tall and weighs 72 kg. She has played for Fenerbahçe since 2000 in youth level and since 2006–2007 in senior level. She played 74 times for Turkey national women's basketball team.

== Honors ==
- Turkish Championship
  - Winners (1): 2007
- Turkish Cup
  - Winners (1): 2007
- Turkish Presidents Cup
  - Winners (1): 2007

== See also ==
- Turkish women in sports
