= Hurtu =

French car

Compagnie des Autos et Cycles Hurtu
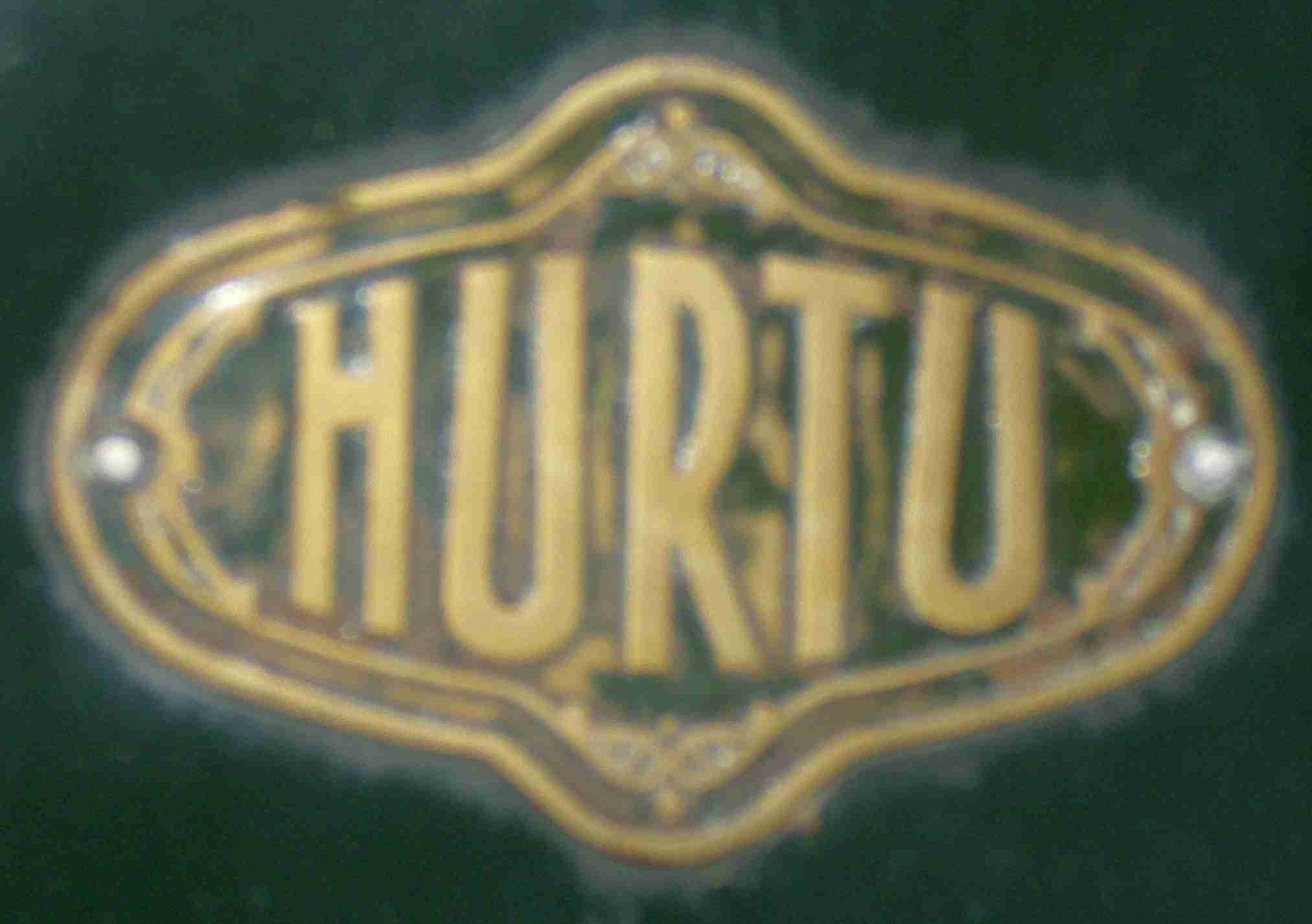
- Industry: Automotive
- Founded: 1896
- Founder: E Diligeon
- Headquarters: Albert, Somme, France
- Products: Automobile

Hurtu was a pioneering French car made by Diligeon et Cie based in Albert, Somme from 1896 to 1930. As well as cars, the company also made sewing machines and bicycles.

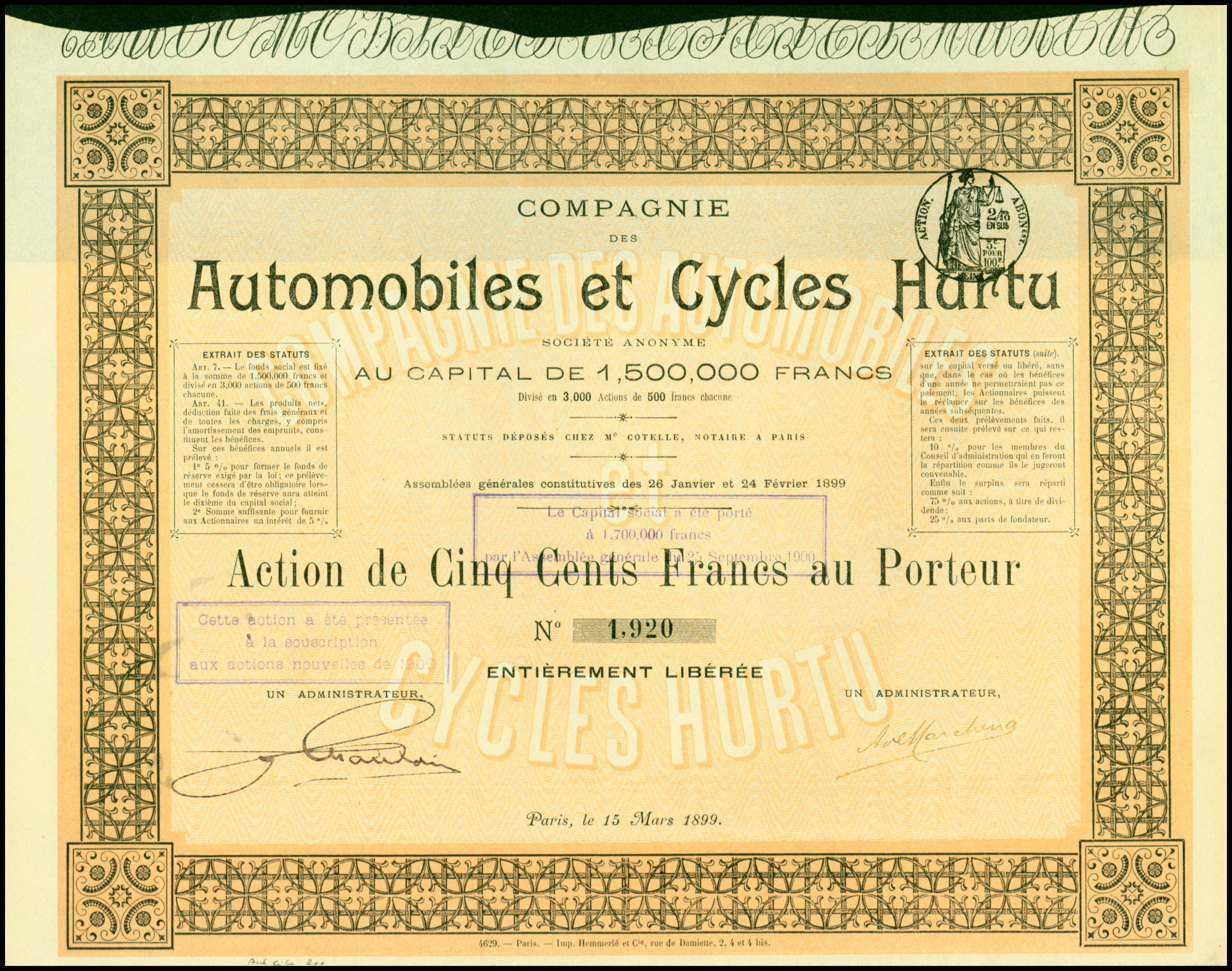
Share of the Compagnie des Automobiles et Cycles Hurtu, issued 15. March 1899

The company was founded in 1880 as Hurtu, Hautin et Diligeon as a maker of sewing machines but soon added machine tools and bicycles to their range. In 1895 E. Diligeon bought out his partners and renamed the company Diligeon et Cie but continued to use the Hurtu name on his products. They made their first car in 1896, a licence built version of the Leon Bollée tricar. They ended up making more of these then Leon Bollée themselves. Four-wheeled vehicles followed in 1897 with a close copy of the German Benz.

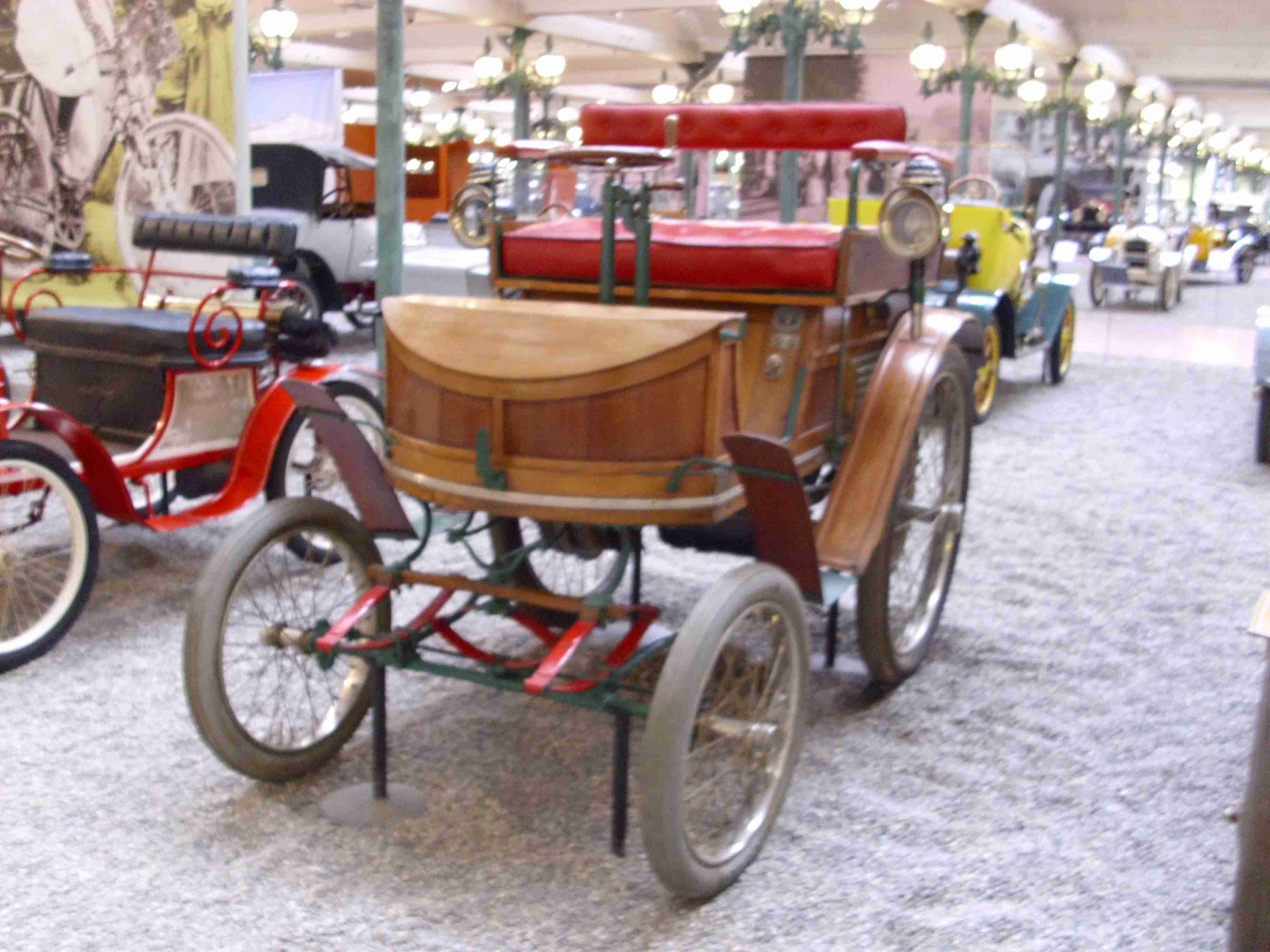
1897 Hurtu

In 1899 the company was re-organised and renamed as the Compagnie des Automobiles et Cycles Hurtu. In 1900 the Benz type car was replaced by a new model powered by a De Dion-Bouton 3.5 hp single-cylinder engine with shaft drive and 2- or 4-seat open coachwork.

1907 models started to feature a dashboard radiator as used by Renault, and this style continued in use until 1920.

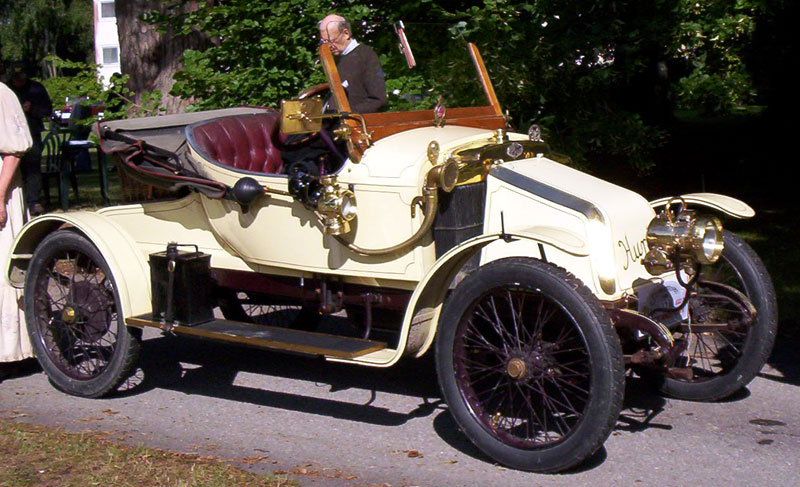
1912 Hurtu with dash radiator

1913 production seems to have been around 600 cars comprising 4-cylinder models of 1692cc and 2120cc capacity with the gearbox and engine constructed in-unit.

After World War I car production re-commenced and from 1920 a conventional front-radiator 2358cc four-cylinder model appeared with front wheel brakes being fitted from 1922. A smaller 1328cc joined the range in 1925. These continued until 1930 when the company stopped car production but continued as machinery manufacturers.

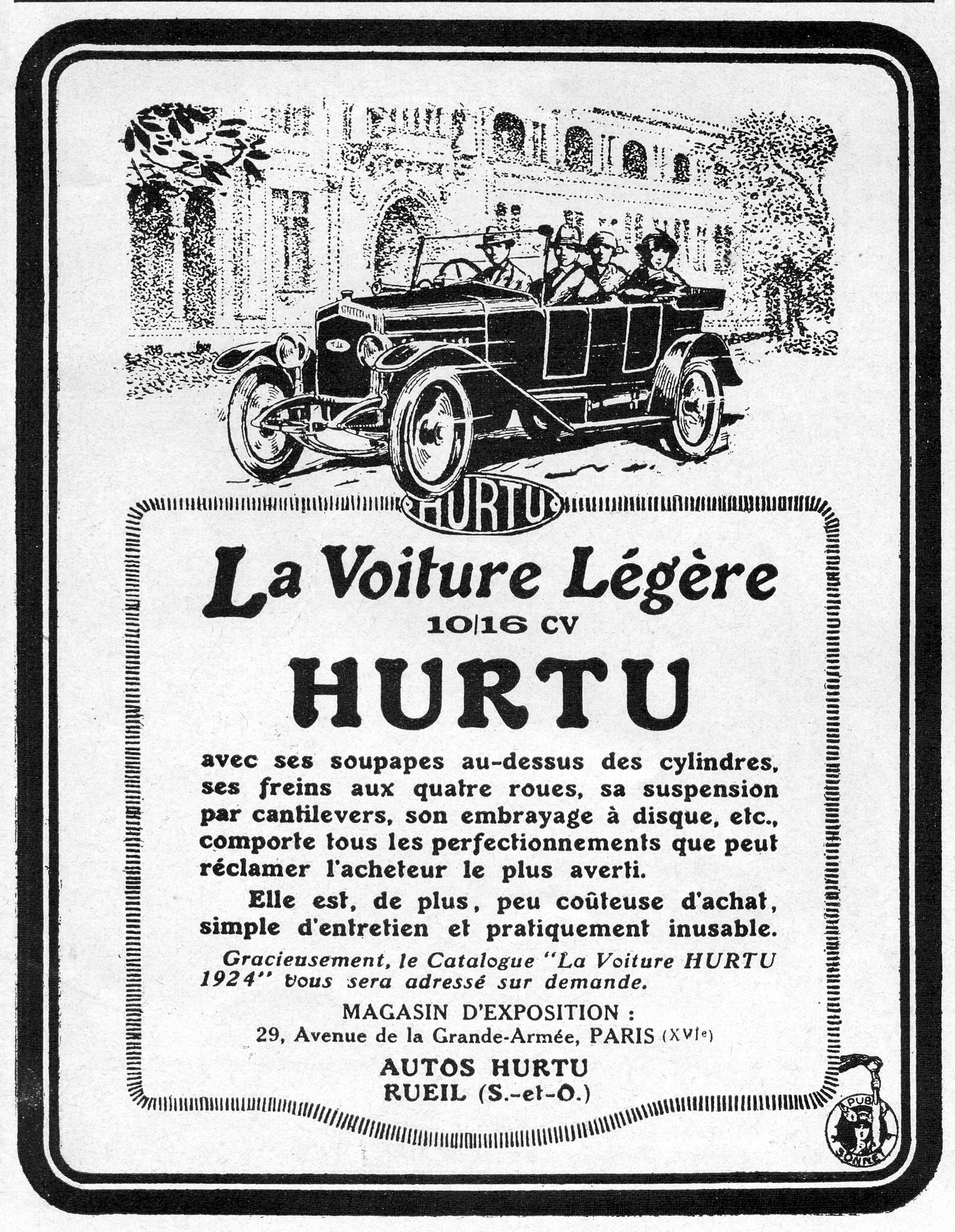
Advertisement for the 1924 Hurtu

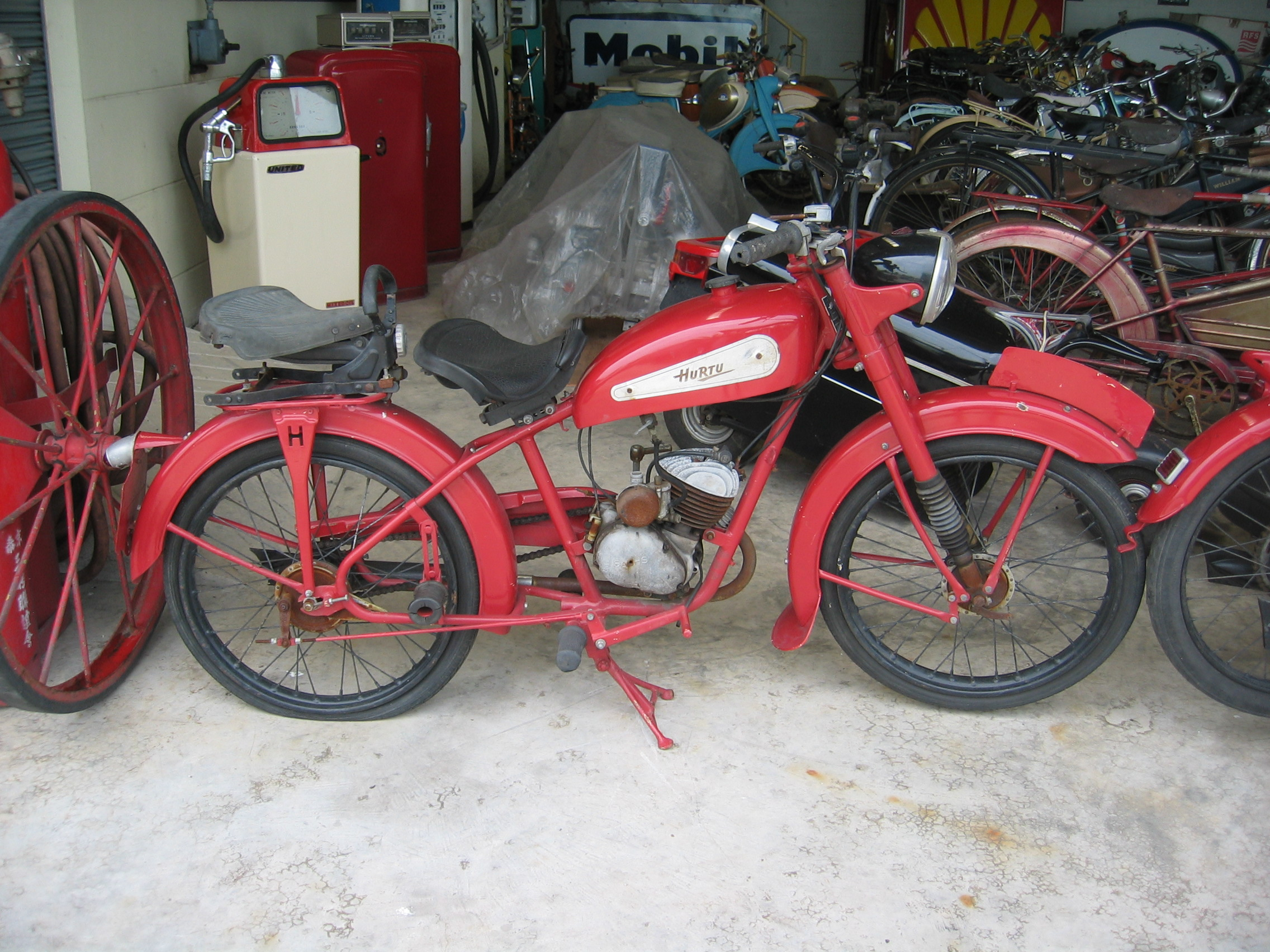
A very rare Hurtu motorcycle
