= Super Champion =

Super Champion Logo

Super Champion was a French brand of high quality bicycle rims for competition and road use. Super Champion was eventually purchased by tire manufacturer Wolber. In the 1980s, Super Champion's line of rims included:

Name	Nominal Size	Weight
Tubular Rims
Route	700c	365g
Arc-en-Ciel	700c	345g
Prestige	700c	375g
Record	700c	390g
Record du Monde	700c	330g
Performance	700c	275g
Medaille d'Or	700c	260g
Clincher Rims
Gentleman	700c	500g
Model 58	650b	525g
Model 58	700c	565g

Super Champion also sold a line of rims by the name of Mixte (580g), capable of taking either a clincher tire or a sew up.
