= Hommes =

- Commune
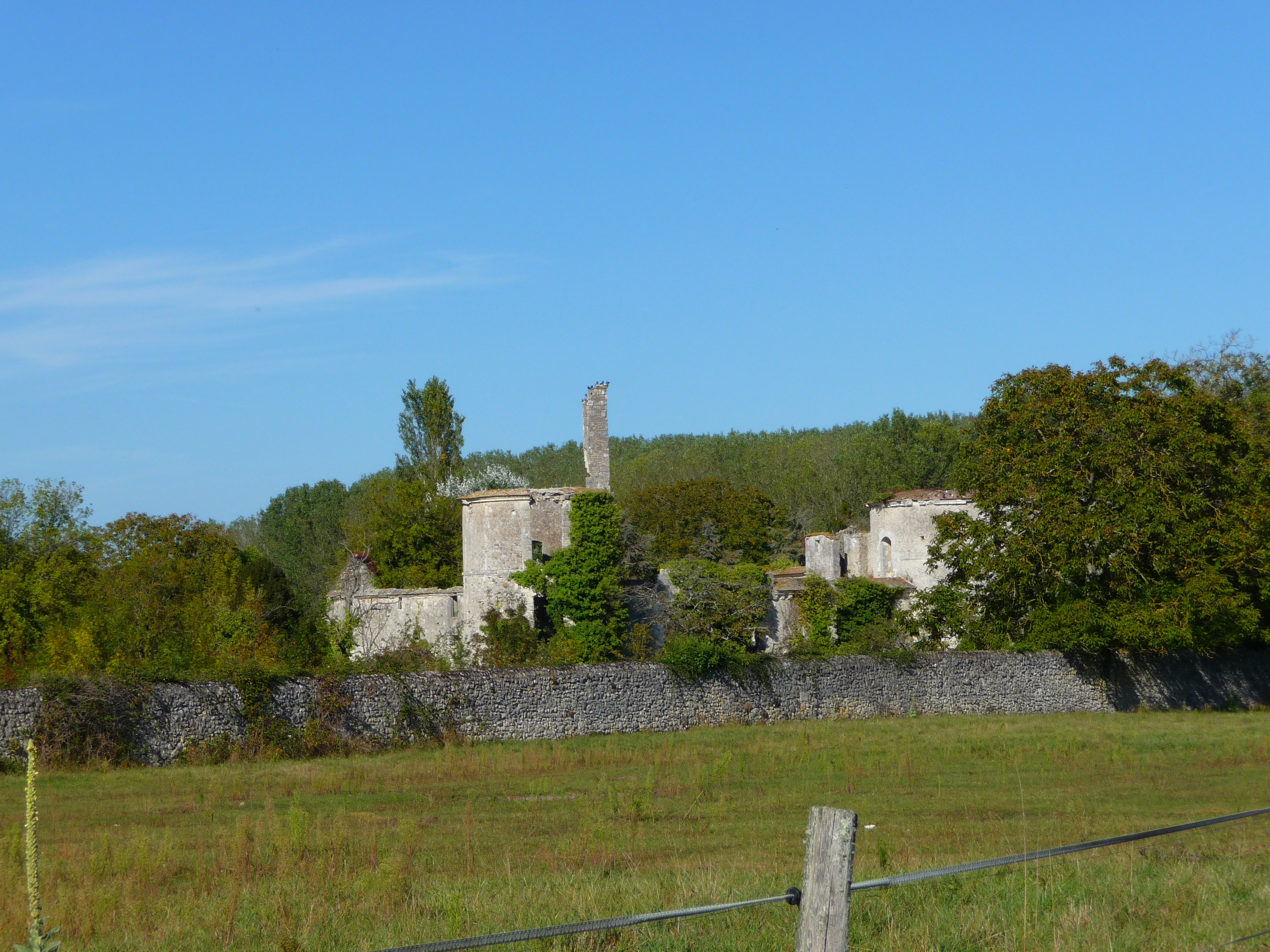
- Chateau

- Coat of arms
- Location of Hommes
- Location within France Location within Centre-Val de Loire
- Coordinates: 47°25′36″N 0°17′51″E
- Country: France
- Region: Centre-Val de Loire
- Department: Indre-et-Loire
- Arrondissement: Chinon
- Canton: Langeais

Government
  - Mayor (2020–2026): Hubert Hardy
- Area^{1}: 29.59 km^{2} (11.42 sq mi)
- Highest elevation: 93 m (305 ft)
- Lowest elevation: 75 m (246 ft)
- Population (2023): 865
  - Density: 29.2/km^{2} (75.7/sq mi)
- Time zone: UTC+01:00 (CET)
  - Summer (DST): UTC+02:00 (CEST)
- INSEE/Postal code: 37117 /37340
- ^{1} French Land Register data, which excludes lakes, ponds, glaciers > 1 km^{2} (0.386 sq mi or 247 acres) and river estuaries.

Hommes (French pronunciation: [ɔm]) is a commune in the Indre-et-Loire department in central France.

== Population ==
Historical population
Year	Pop.	±% p.a.
1968	814	—
1975	684	−2.46%
1982	673	−0.23%
1990	648	−0.47%
1999	664	+0.27%
2007	789	+2.18%
2012	907	+2.83%
2017	886	−0.47%
2023	865	−0.40%
Source: INSEE

The inhabitants are called Houlmois in French.

== See also ==
- Communes of the Indre-et-Loire department
