= Cyfac =

French bicycle manufacturer

- Company type: Private
- Industry: Bicycle industry
- Founded: 1983; 42 years ago
- Founder: Francis Quillon
- Headquarters: Hommes, France
- Products: Bicycles
- Website: www.cyfac.fr

Cyfac International is a manufacturer of bicycles in La Fuye, Hommes in the Loire Valley of France. The name is an acronym that translates from French to "Handmade Bicycle Frames". "Cy" represents cycle (bicycle), "f" for fabriqué (made), "a" for "artisanal" (artisan), and the final C stands for cadres (frame). The Cyfac Postural System is a bicycle fitting system based on research at Lyon Center of Sports Medicine.

== History ==
Founded in 1983 by Francis Quillon, Cyfac began in his garage with the help of his wife, Mireille. Quillon was a successful amateur racer, a sprinter for the national team. During his racing career he worked for one of his team's sponsors, a local bicycle manufacturer. Quillon repaired his teammates' bikes, started making bikes from scratch, and eventually started to equip pro racers who wanted frames made and then painted in their sponsor's name. Quillon opened the Cyfac workshop to supply frames to racing teams.

The company was sold to Jose Alvarez, a now-defunct French distributor for Specialized, Look, Easton, and BMC bicycles.

In 2008, ownership changed with the managing director, Aymeric Le Brun, and the US distributor, Eric Sakalowsky, buying the company from the original owner. Quillon is honorary president.

== Manufacturing Process ==
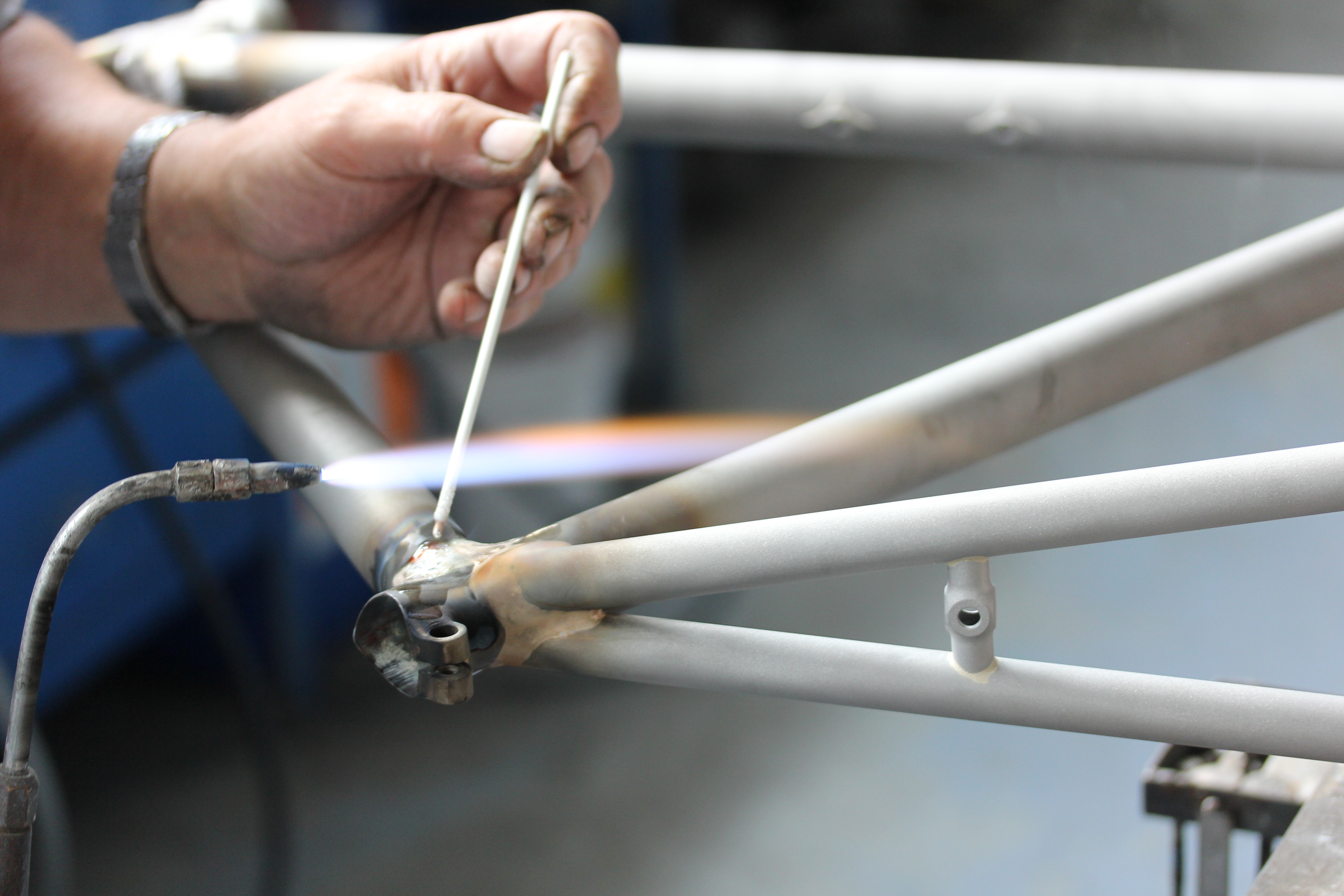
A Cyfac artisan filet brazes a custom steel bicycle frameset.

Cyfac manufactures all frames in La Fuye, including cutting, welding, painting, and finishing. Tubing is from Asia or Italy depending on the material. By 2009 it produced 1000-1200 frames a year.

== Current products ==
- Absolu – carbon frame designed for performance
- Gothica – carbon frame for comfort
- Cadence – carbon frame for a mix of performance and comfort
- Infini Carbone – aluminum/carbon frame for race performance
- Osmose – titanium/carbon frame designed for performance and comfort
- Nerv – aluminum frame for all-round riding
- Mega Cross – aluminum cyclocross frame
- Mega Piste – aluminum track frame
