= Bourgueil AOC =

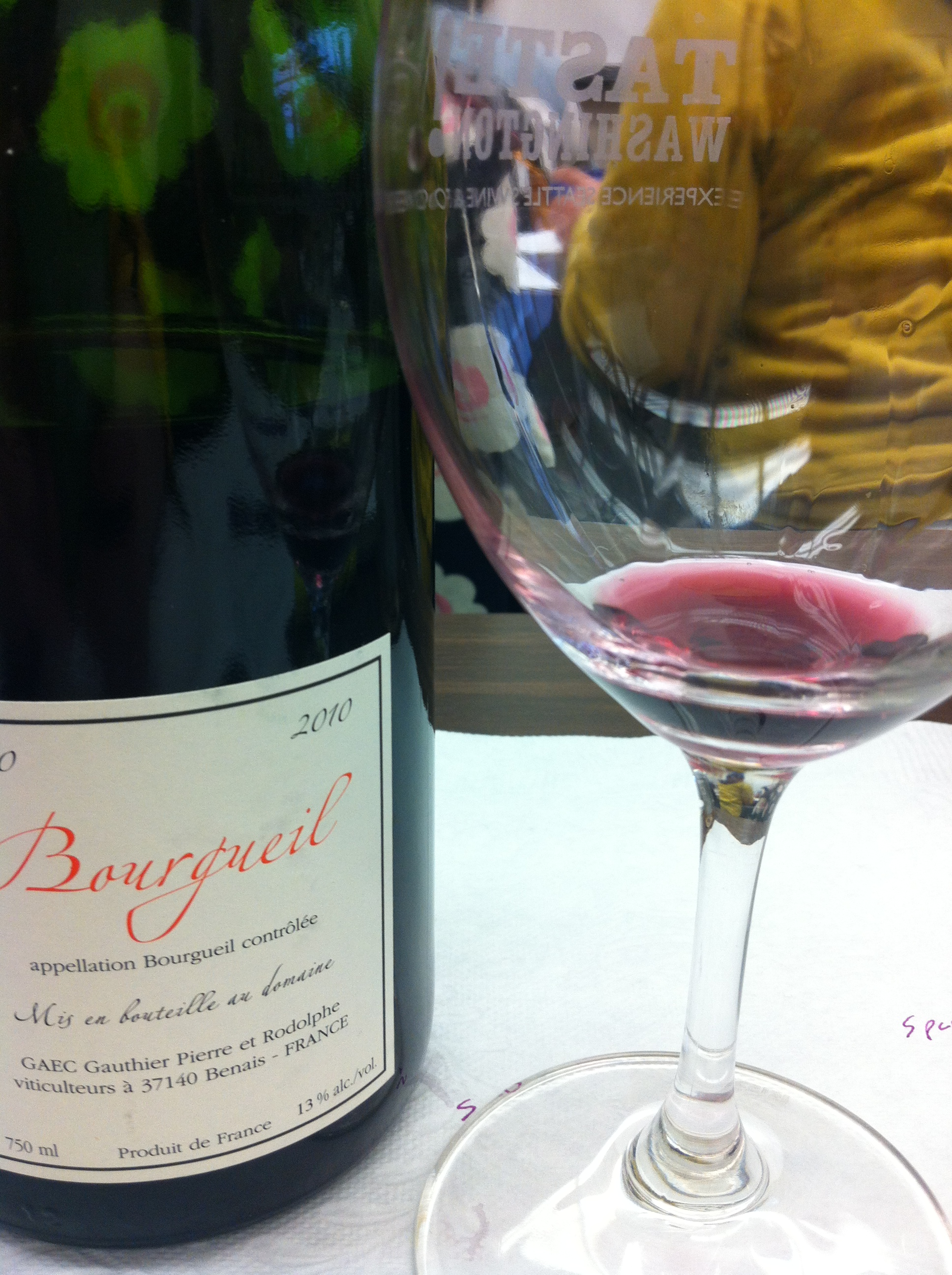
A wine from the Bourgueil AOC.

Bourgueil (French pronunciation: [buʁɡœj]) is an appellation d'origine contrôlée (AOC) for wine in the Loire Valley region, and produces primarily red wine from the grape variety Cabernet Franc, located in the commune of Bourgueil and surrounding communes. Bourgueil gained Appellation d'Origine Contrôlée (AOC) status when regulatory laws were passed on 31 July 1937.

== Climate and geography ==
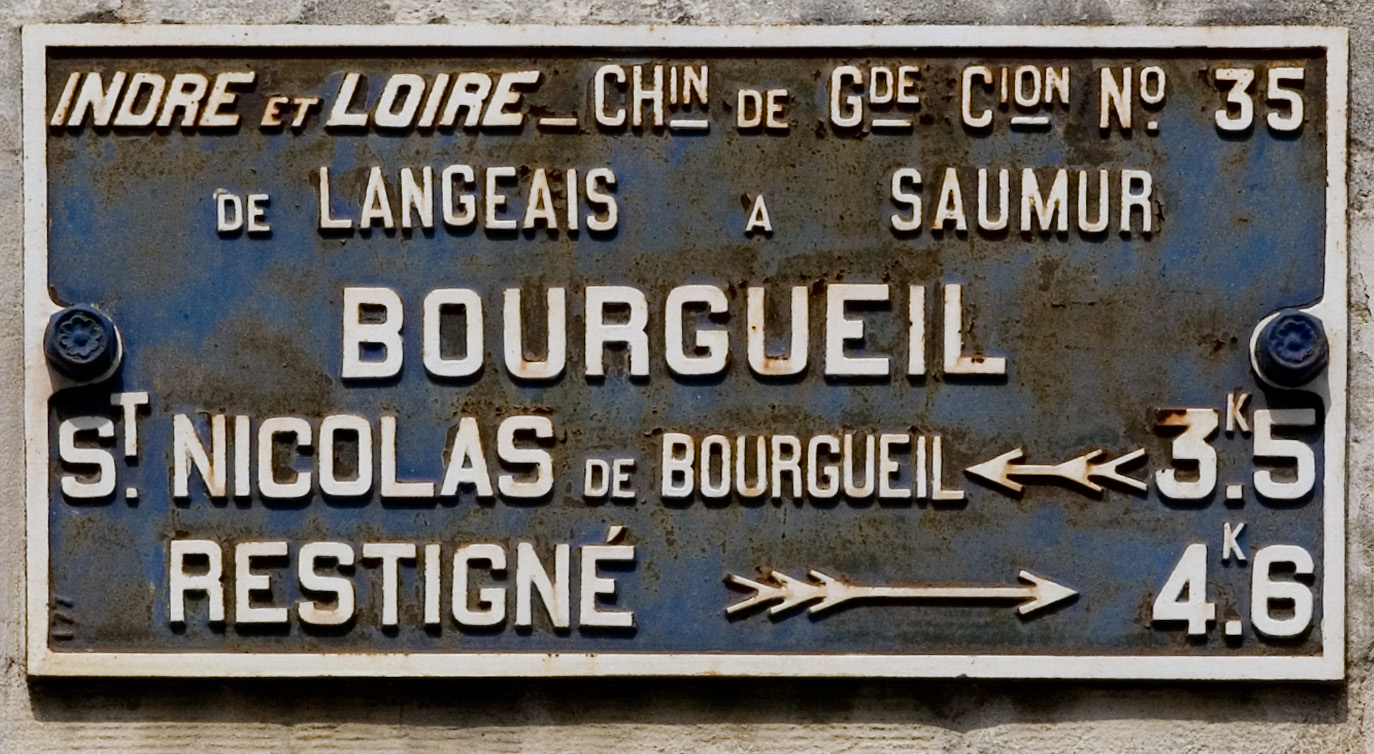
Road sign in Bourgueil showing its proximity to other Loire Valley wine regions.

Like other wine regions in the Saumur region, Bourgueil has mostly a continental climate with some maritime influences that are enhanced the further west you go in the AOC. It is situated on the right bank of the river Loire, which provides some climate moderation, to the west of Tours and on the edge of the Maine-et-Loire department. The AOC region stretches over an area of 1400 hectares, encompassing 7 communes of the Indre-et-Loire department: Restigné, Benais, Ingrandes-de-Touraine, Saint-Patrice, Chouzé-sur-Loire, La Chapelle-sur-Loire and Bourgueil.

The wine region contains three different types of soil; the rocky soil of islets rising out of most recent alluvia, the sandy and gravelly soil of high terraces (old alluvia), and the limestone-rich soil of coasts that lean back onto forestland.

== Grapes and wine ==
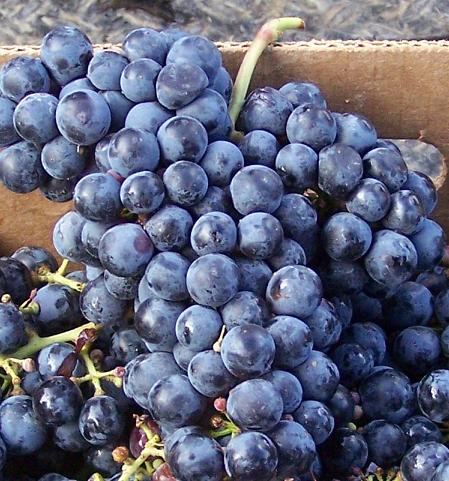
Cabernet Franc is the primary grape of Bourgueil.

Bourgueil wine is made from the Cabernet Franc grape variety, which is locally called Cabernet Breton. Up to 10% of the wine can also be made from Cabernet Sauvignon grapes. Limestone soil produces wines with a dusky red hue, whereas those grown in siliceous soil take on a redcurrant shade. Bourgueil wines have a floral and fruity bouquet, which becomes earthy as the wine ages. These wines age splendidly in the bottle, keeping for up to 20 years. Rosé production is limited, accounting for just 2-5% of total production.

== See also ==
- Saint-Nicolas-de-Bourgueil AOC
