= Saint-Nicolas-de-Bourgueil AOC =

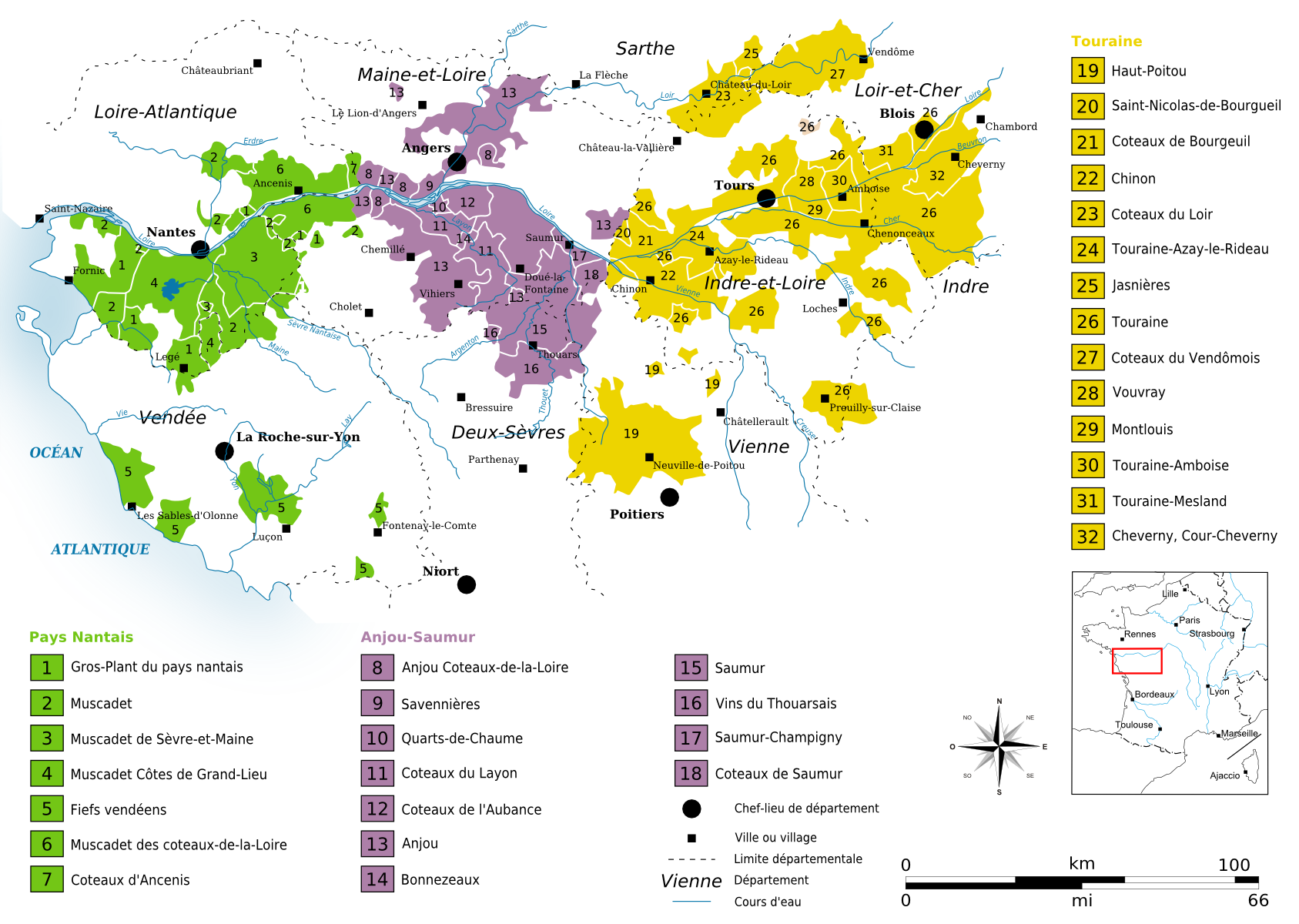
Saint-Nicolas-de-Bourgueil AOC (#20 in yellow) within the greater Loire Valley wine region.

Saint-Nicolas-de-Bourgueil (French pronunciation: [sɛ̃ nikɔla də buʁɡœj]) is a French wine Appellation d'origine contrôlée (AOC) in the Loire valley on the right bank of the river Loire. The AOC was created by a decree on July 31, 1937, covering about 800 hectares in the commune of Saint-Nicolas-de-Bourgueil in the département of Indre-et-Loire.

Saint Nicolas de Bourgueil produces both red wine and rosé wines though rosés usually account for only about 2% of the production. The main variety of the AOC is Cabernet Franc (locally called Breton), which is allowed to be supplemented with up to 10% Cabernet Sauvignon.

These wines are renowned for being fruity, similar to those of the neighboring Bourgueil AOC, and well suited for pairing with a wide variety of dishes.

== History ==
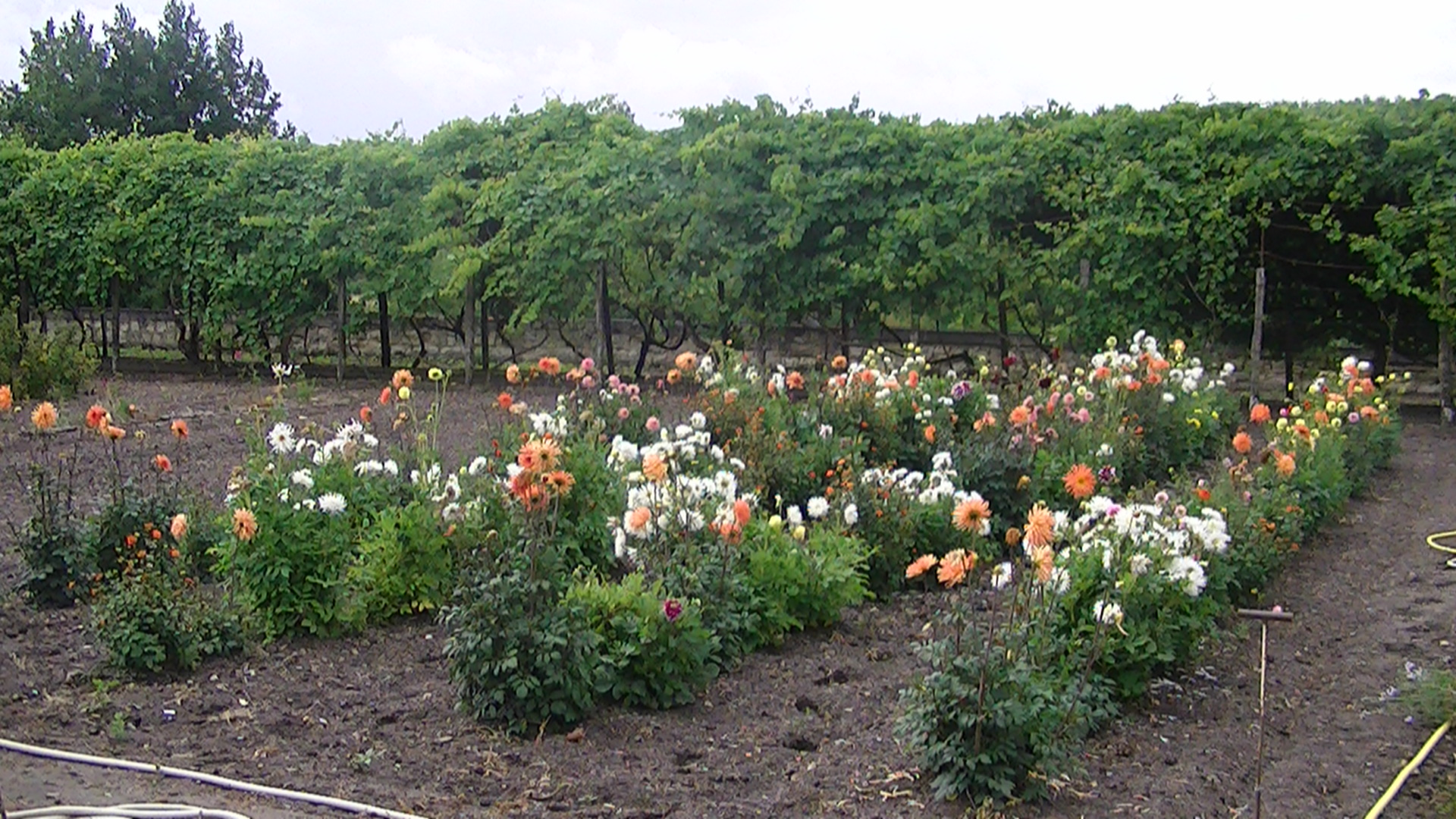
According to local legend, Cabernet Franc (Breton) was brought to Saint-Nicolas-de-Bourgueil after it was first planted at the nearby Abbey of Bourgueil. Even today the Abbey still has plantings of the grape in its garden.

Located west of the city of Tours, the area of Saint-Nicolas-de-Bourgueil has seen viticulture since at least the days of the Romans. Though long overshadowed by the neighboring communes of Bourgueil and Chinon across the Loire, the area earned a reputation for the quality of its red wine as early as the Middle Ages. According to local legend, the Cabernet Franc grape was introduced to area in 1090 when it was planted in the nearby Bourgueil Abbey. Like neighboring Bourgueil, the Bretons of Brittany were a significant customer for the wines of Saint-Nicolas-de-Bourgueil and by at least the 16th century the wine from the area was being described as "Breton wine".

When the Institut national de l'origine et de la qualité (INAO) was delineating AOC regions in 1937, the commune of Saint-Nicolas-de-Bourgueil was originally grouped with the communes of Bourgueil, Benais and Restigné under one Bourgueil AOC. But Adrien Ory, mayor of Saint-Nicolas-de-Bourgueil and one of the largest vineyard owners in the region, campaigned for a separate AOC designation for the wines from his town despite the two AOCs having essentially identical terroir and producing similar wines. However at the time of AOC creation, the maximum allowable yields for Saint-Nicolas-de-Bourgueil were slightly lower than for Bourgueil but subsequent revisions of AOC regulations have now made them completely the same for both AOCs.

== Climates and geography ==
The coat of arms for the commune of Saint-Nicolas-de-Bourgueil which places a strong emphasis on the region's winemaking history.

Located on the north "right bank" of the river Loire in the Touraine wine, Saint-Nicolas-de-Bourgueil experiences some of the maritime climate influences from the Atlantic that the neighboring AOCs in Anjou see but with some continental climate elements as well. The river Vienne reaches the Loire at Candes-Saint-Martin across from the AOC creating a large body of water with a resulting lake effect that tempers the climate.

The AOC boundaries of Saint-Nicolas-de-Bourgueil fall within the Bourgueil AOC, northwest of the commune of Bourgueil itself on terraces of silt deposits that border the Maine-et-Loire department and Anjou wine region. Centered on the commune of Saint-Nicolas-de-Bourgueil, the vineyard soils of the AOC are not much different than the greater Bourgueil region with the exception of a slightly higher sand/limestone content (known locally as varennes). About a third of the region's vineyards are planted on Turonian chalk, a type of limestone.

== Viticulture and winemaking ==
Like most of the Loire, the main red grape of Saint-Nicolas-de-Bourgueil is Cabernet franc (known locally as Breton) with Cabernet Sauvignon accounting for an increasing amount of plantings. Vineyards are densely planted with 5000 grapevines per hectare. Both Cabernet varieties are usually trained to the guyot simple system with one long cane pruned to seven or eight buds each winter. Cabernet Franc is mid-ripening, while Cabernet Sauvignon is late-ripening varieties that require a long growing season ideally ending with an Indian summer in order to achieve full ripeness.

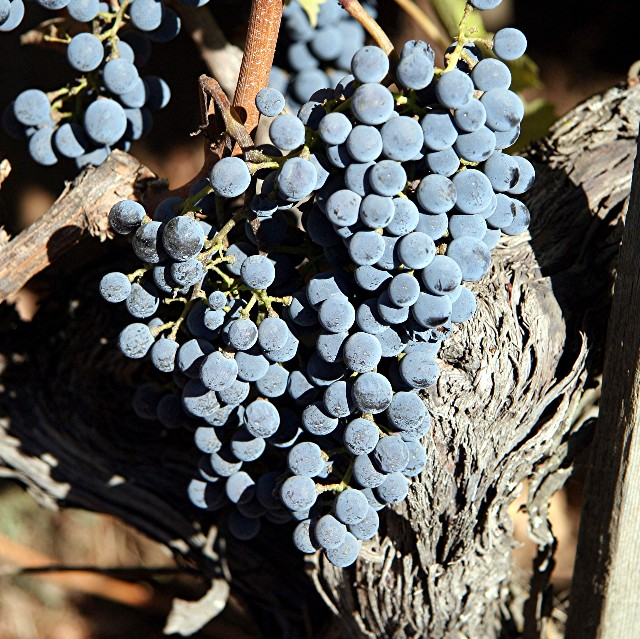
Cabernet Franc.

After harvest the grapes are destemmed and crushed with a short maceration period, often with the must warmed up to aid in extraction of color and phenolics before the wines are pressed and put into barrel. The wine almost always goes through malolactic fermentation. Some Saint-Nicolas-de-Bourgueil producers with vineyards planted in lighter soils will produce an early maturing wine, with an even shorter maceration period and much less oak aging, that can be released as early as the summer after vintage while other examples will see 15 to 18 months of aging before being bottled.

== Production and wine industry ==
In 1998, Saint-Nicolas-de-Bourgueil produced 53,572 hectoliters of wine (around 595,240 cases) from 929 hectares (approximately 2295 acres) of vineyards. By 2013, that number had expanded to 1,050 hectares (2,600 acres) producing around 59,000 hl (more than 655,500 cases) of wine of which 98% was red and 2% was rosé.

Many producers in Saint-Nicolas-de-Bourgueil own vineyard land in both Saint-Nicolas-de-Bourgueil as well as the greater Bourgueil region and will often blend to make one Bourgueil AOC bottling. Among the producers who make separate Saint-Nicolas-de-Bourgueil and Bourgueil bottlings are Domaine Yannick Amirault which owns the Les Malgagnes vineyard that contains some of the oldest vines in Saint-Nicolas-de-Bourgueil. Among the producers that usually just make Saint-Nicolas-de-Bourgueil wine, Domaine Joël Taluau is often considered "the grandfather of Saint-Nicolas-de-Bourgueil" as they were one of the first producers in the area to do estate bottling.

== Wines and AOC regulation ==
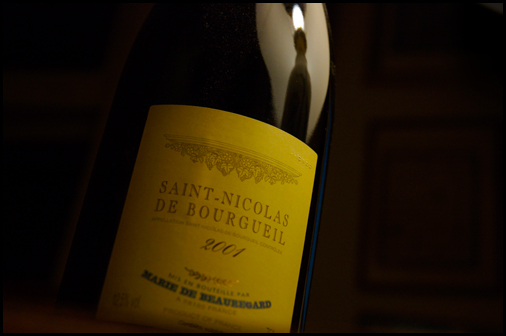
A bottle of Saint-Nicolas-de-Bourgueil wine.

According to Master of Wine Clive Coates, the wines of Saint-Nicolas-de-Bourgueil are noted for a distinctive raspberry aroma that can also have elements of pencil shavings. Compared to Chinon, the wines tend to be slightly more austere with more noticeable acidity. While very similar, Coates notes that Saint-Nicolas-de-Bourgueil can be a little more aromatic and lighter than neighboring Bourgueil.

Wine writer Tom Stevenson notes that Saint-Nicolas-de-Bourgueil wines tend to have a little more "finesse" than Bourgueil, often requiring 5 to 6 years of aging after bottling before they are drunk at their peak and are able to age much longer. Stevenson describes the rosés as medium-bodied, dry and fruity.

For wines to be labelled under the Saint-Nicolas-de-Bourgueil AOC designation, the grapes must be limited to a harvest yield no greater than 55 hl/ha (approximately 3 tons/acre). The blend must be made primarily from Cabernet Franc with Cabernet Sauvignon limited to making up no more than 10% of the blend. The finished wine must contain at least 9.5% alcohol by volume.
