= Lathan =

Lathan may refer to:

- Lathan (name), a given name and surname (includes a list of people with the name)
- Eas Lathan, a waterfall in Scotland
- Lathan (river), a river in France, sub-tributary of the Loire

== See also ==
- Lathan's Gold, an adventure module for the Dungeons & Dragons role-playing game
- Hatte Lathan, a village in Haiti
- Channay-sur-Lathan, a commune in central France
- Savigné-sur-Lathan, a commune in central France
- Lathon
