= Ingrandes =

Ingrandes may refer to the following communes in France:

- Ingrandes, Indre, in the Indre department
- Ingrandes, Maine-et-Loire, in the Maine-et-Loire department
- Ingrandes, Vienne, in the Vienne department
- Ingrandes-de-Touraine, in the Indre-et-Loire department
