= Saint-Patrice (disambiguation) =

Saint-Patrice is the name of several places:

== Canada ==
- Saint-Patrice-de-Beaurivage, a municipality in Quebec
- Saint-Patrice-de-Sherrington, a parish in Quebec

== France ==
- Saint-Patrice, a commune in Indre-et-Loire département
