= Les Essards, Indre-et-Loire =

Les Essards
- Part of Langeais
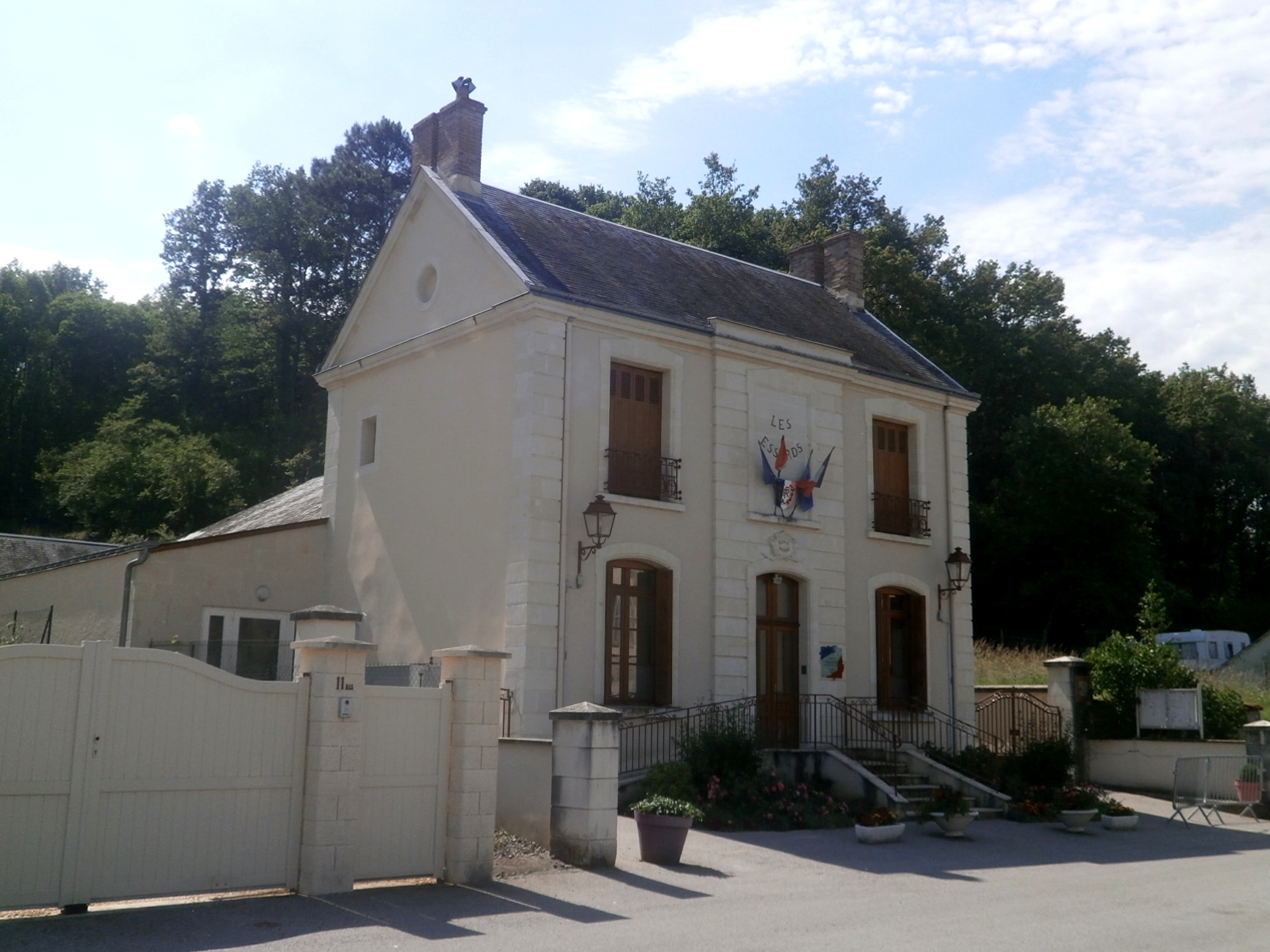
- Town hall
- Location of Les Essards
- Location within France Location within Centre-Val de Loire
- Coordinates: 47°20′46″N 0°18′10″E
- Country: France
- Region: Centre-Val de Loire
- Department: Indre-et-Loire
- Arrondissement: Chinon
- Canton: Langeais
- Commune: Langeais
- Area^{1}: 4.17 km^{2} (1.61 sq mi)
- Highest elevation: 105 m (344 ft)
- Lowest elevation: 52 m (171 ft)
- Population (2023): 147
  - Density: 35.3/km^{2} (91.3/sq mi)
- Time zone: UTC+01:00 (CET)
  - Summer (DST): UTC+02:00 (CEST)
- Postal code: 37130
- ^{1} French Land Register data, which excludes lakes, ponds, glaciers > 1 km^{2} (0.386 sq mi or 247 acres) and river estuaries.

Les Essards (French pronunciation: [le.z‿ɛsaʁ]) is a former commune in the Indre-et-Loire department in central France. On 1 January 2017, it was merged into the commune Langeais.

== See also ==
- Communes of the Indre-et-Loire department
