= Saint-Michel-sur-Loire =

- Part of Coteaux-sur-Loire
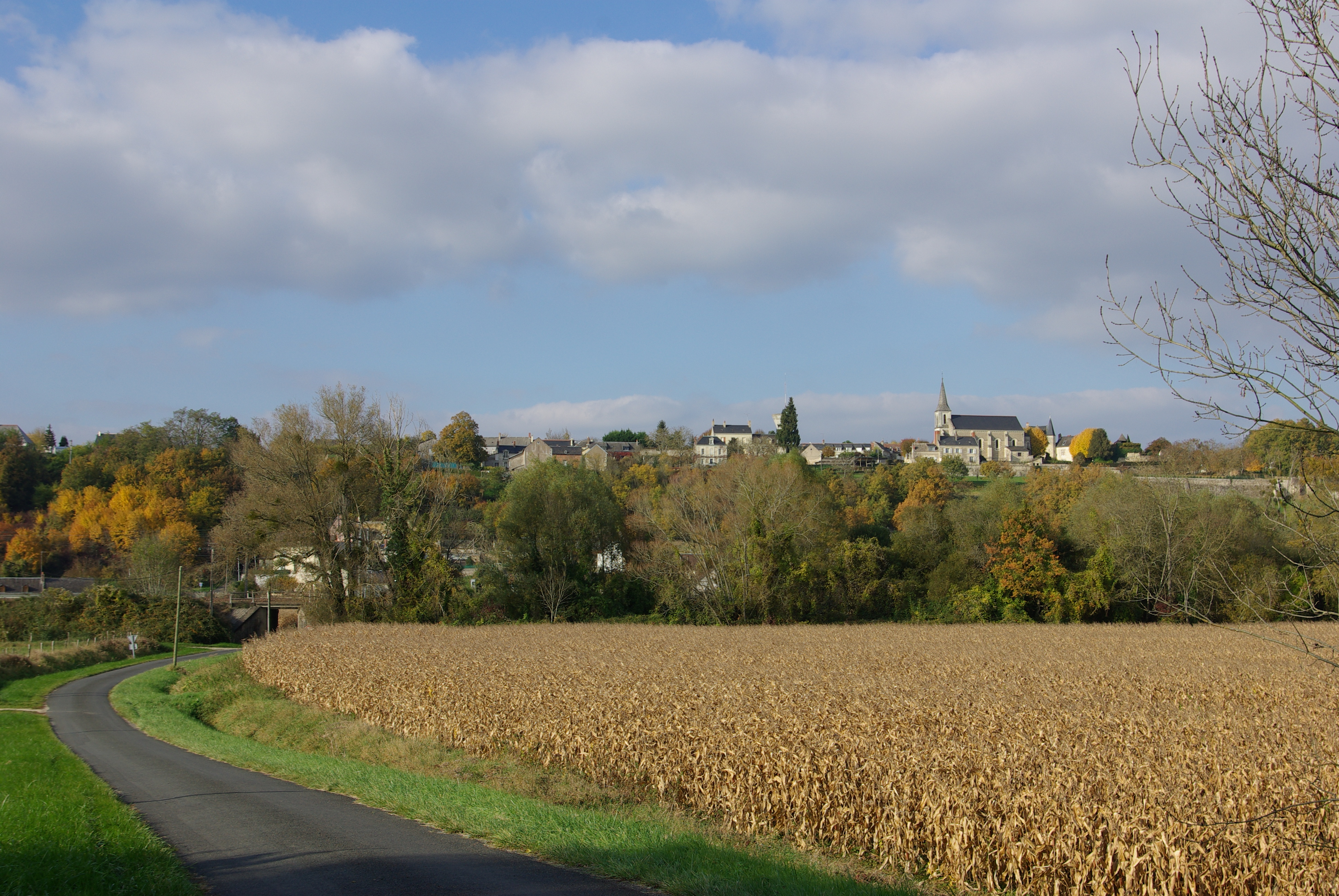
- A general view of Saint-Michel-sur-Loire
- Location of Saint-Michel-sur-Loire
- Location within France Location within Centre-Val de Loire
- Coordinates: 47°18′30″N 0°21′00″E
- Country: France
- Region: Centre-Val de Loire
- Department: Indre-et-Loire
- Arrondissement: Chinon
- Canton: Langeais
- Commune: Coteaux-sur-Loire
- Area^{1}: 17.51 km^{2} (6.76 sq mi)
- Highest elevation: 108 m (354 ft)
- Lowest elevation: 32 m (105 ft)
- Population (2019): 708
  - Density: 40.4/km^{2} (105/sq mi)
- Time zone: UTC+01:00 (CET)
  - Summer (DST): UTC+02:00 (CEST)
- Postal code: 37130
- ^{1} French Land Register data, which excludes lakes, ponds, glaciers > 1 km^{2} (0.386 sq mi or 247 acres) and river estuaries.

Saint-Michel-sur-Loire (French pronunciation: [sɛ̃ miʃɛl syʁ lwaʁ], literally Saint Michel on Loire) is a former commune in the Indre-et-Loire department in central France. On 1 January 2017, it was merged into the new commune Coteaux-sur-Loire.

== Population ==
Historical population

| Year | Pop. | ±% p.a. |
|---|---|---|
| 1793 | 643 | — |
| 1821 | 755 | +0.58% |
| 1846 | 833 | +0.39% |
| 1872 | 753 | −0.39% |
| 1901 | 671 | −0.40% |
| 1926 | 573 | −0.63% |
| 1946 | 474 | −0.94% |
| 1962 | 534 | +0.75% |

| Year | Pop. | ±% p.a. |
|---|---|---|
| 1968 | 514 | −0.63% |
| 1975 | 412 | −3.11% |
| 1982 | 432 | +0.68% |
| 1990 | 535 | +2.71% |
| 1999 | 509 | −0.55% |
| 2006 | 559 | +1.35% |
| 2019 | 708 | +1.83% |

Source: EHESS and INSEE

== See also ==
- Communes of the Indre-et-Loire department
