= Saint-Nicolas-de-Bourgueil =

- Commune
- Coat of arms
- Location of Saint-Nicolas-de-Bourgueil
- Location within France Location within Centre-Val de Loire
- Coordinates: 47°17′06″N 0°07′36″E
- Country: France
- Region: Centre-Val de Loire
- Department: Indre-et-Loire
- Arrondissement: Chinon
- Canton: Langeais

Government
  - Mayor (2020–2026): Sébastien Berger
- Area^{1}: 36.45 km^{2} (14.07 sq mi)
- Highest elevation: 116 m (381 ft)
- Lowest elevation: 26 m (85 ft)
- Population (2023): 1,116
  - Density: 30.62/km^{2} (79.30/sq mi)
- Time zone: UTC+01:00 (CET)
  - Summer (DST): UTC+02:00 (CEST)
- INSEE/Postal code: 37228 /37500
- ^{1} French Land Register data, which excludes lakes, ponds, glaciers > 1 km^{2} (0.386 sq mi or 247 acres) and river estuaries.

Saint-Nicolas-de-Bourgueil (French pronunciation: [sɛ̃ nikɔla də buʁɡœj], literally Saint-Nicolas of Bourgueil) is a commune in the Indre-et-Loire department in central France.

This village is in the Loire Valley, in the midst of many castles, such as Chenonceaux, Villandry, etc. The commune is home to a wine appellation, Saint-Nicolas-de-Bourgueil AOC.

== Geography ==
Saint-Nicolas-de-Bourgueil is situated between Angers, Tours and Chinon.

== History ==
The old ecclesia Sancti Nicolai, mentioned in 1208, was situated in the North-east of the present cemetery of Bourgueil.

In 1790–1794, Saint-Nicolas-de-Bourgueil annexed the former commune of La Taille. The current village centre of Saint-Nicolas-de-Bourgueil was built during the July Monarchy (1830-1848).

== Population ==
Historical population
Year	Pop.	±% p.a.
1968	1,273	—
1975	1,173	−1.16%
1982	1,116	−0.71%
1990	1,176	+0.66%
1999	1,194	+0.17%
2007	1,232	+0.39%
2012	1,145	−1.45%
2017	1,109	−0.64%
2023	1,116	+0.10%
Source: INSEE

Its inhabitants are called the Saint-nicolaisiens in French.

== Personalities ==
Marie Dupin, a conquest of Pierre de Ronsard, lived in the Port Guyer (part of Saint-Nicolas-de-Bourgueil) all her life.
