= Souvigné, Indre-et-Loire =

Souvigné
- Commune
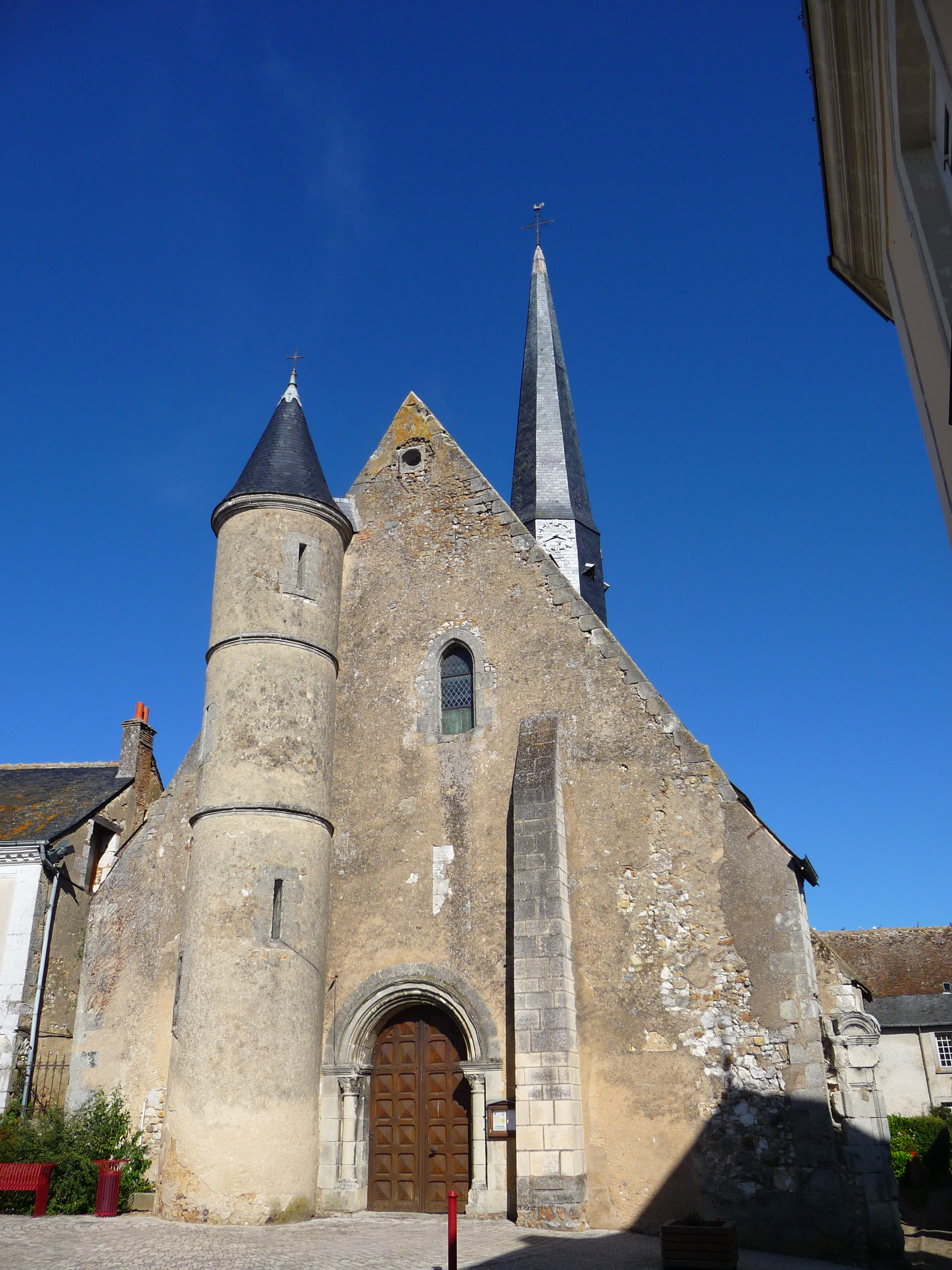
- The church of Saint-Michel, in Souvigné
- Location of Souvigné
- Location within France Location within Centre-Val de Loire
- Coordinates: 47°31′18″N 0°23′57″E
- Country: France
- Region: Centre-Val de Loire
- Department: Indre-et-Loire
- Arrondissement: Chinon
- Canton: Langeais

Government
  - Mayor (2020–2026): Chrystophe Aubert
- Area^{1}: 24.41 km^{2} (9.42 sq mi)
- Highest elevation: 126 m (413 ft)
- Lowest elevation: 76 m (249 ft)
- Population (2023): 933
  - Density: 38.2/km^{2} (99.0/sq mi)
- Time zone: UTC+01:00 (CET)
  - Summer (DST): UTC+02:00 (CEST)
- INSEE/Postal code: 37251 /37330
- ^{1} French Land Register data, which excludes lakes, ponds, glaciers > 1 km^{2} (0.386 sq mi or 247 acres) and river estuaries.

Souvigné (French pronunciation: [suviɲe]) is a commune in the Indre-et-Loire department in central France.

== Population ==
Historical population
Year	Pop.	±% p.a.
1968	622	—
1975	604	−0.42%
1982	540	−1.59%
1990	527	−0.30%
1999	554	+0.56%
2007	717	+3.28%
2012	789	+1.93%
2017	840	+1.26%
2023	933	+1.77%
Source: INSEE

== See also ==
- Communes of the Indre-et-Loire department
