= Château de Vaujours =

French castle

Coordinates: 47°31′40″N 0°20′50″E

The Château de Vaujours is a ruined castle from the 12th and 15th centuries, located in the commune of Château-la-Vallière in the Indre-et-Loire département of central France. It was part of the seigneurie (manor) of Chasteaux-en-Anjou, the future Château-la-Vallière.

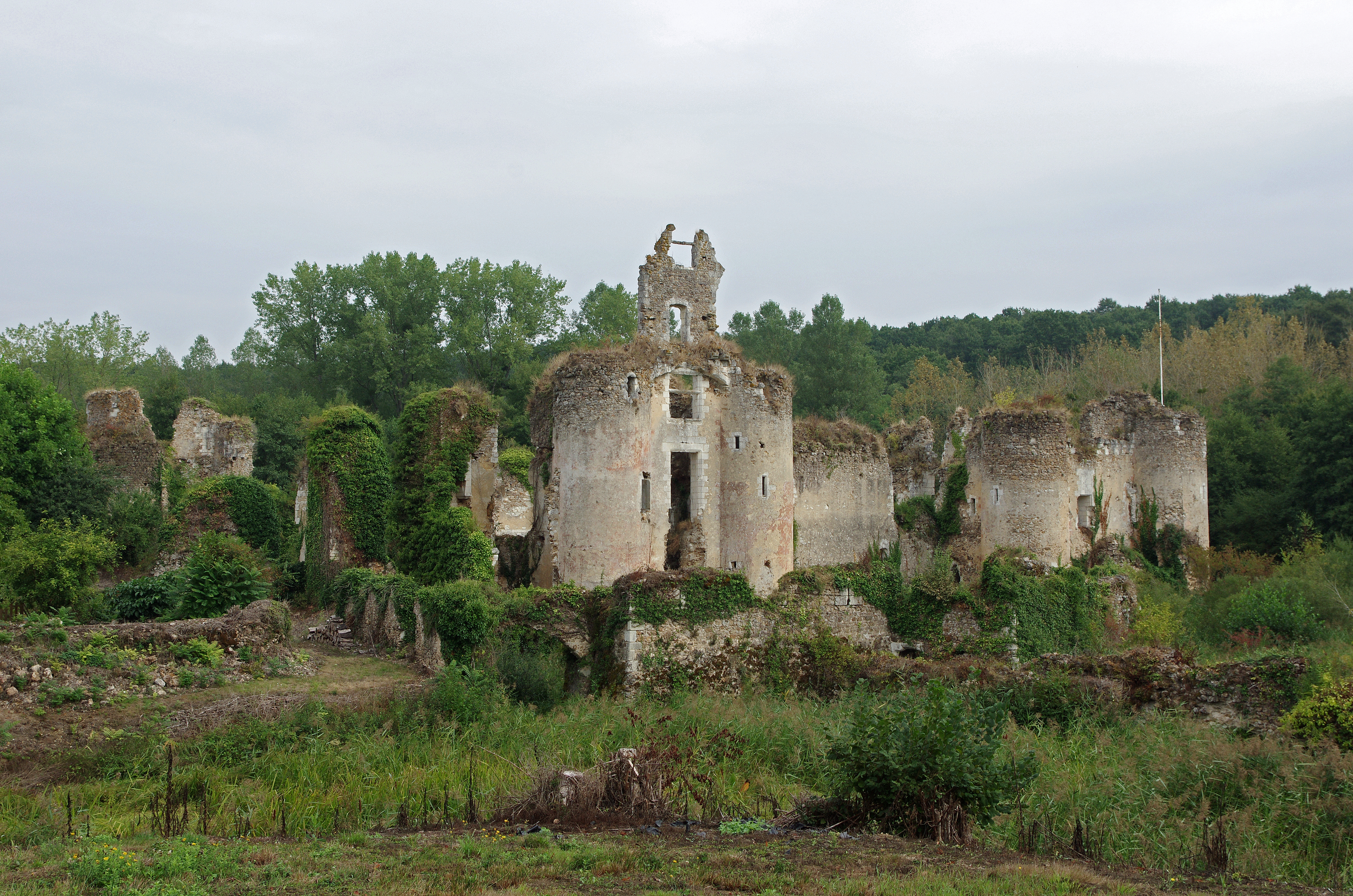
Ruined walls of Vaujours Castle

== Location ==
The castle is located 3 kilometres south of Château-la-Vallière. It stands on the eastern border of the ancient Haut-Anjou, part of the former province of Anjou.

== History ==
Arms of Château-la-Vallière

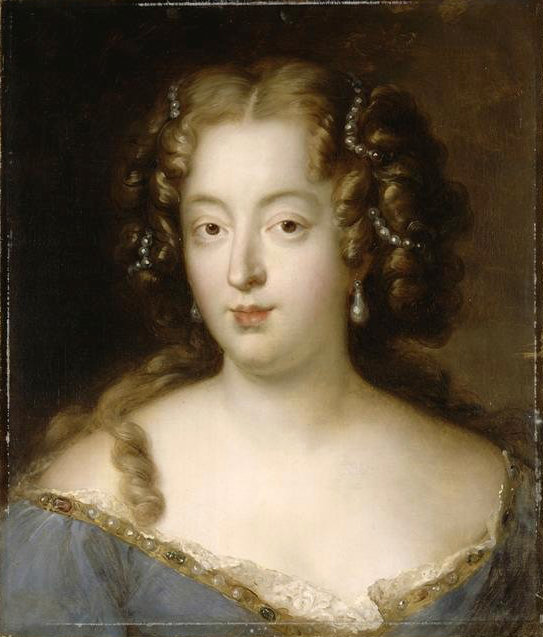
Duchess of La Vallière and Vaujours

The fiefdom of Vaujours was a dependency of the sénéchaussée (bailiwick) of Baugé and the diocese of Angers. Hugues I d'Alluye, living in 978, is the earliest known lord. The castle of the barons of Chasteaux was built to defend the territory of Anjou.

Construction of the castle can be attributed to Hugues VI d'Alluye or to Rotron of Montfort, around 1250.

During the Hundred Years War, the fortress was never taken by the English. A major restoration was undertaken in the 15th century. Jean V de Bueil, nicknamed «le Fléau des Anglais» (the flail of the English), altered the defences such that they became impregnable. He died there in 1477.

Louis XI stayed there during his visits to Anjou.

The daughter of Charles VII and Agnès Sorel, Jeanne de Valois, married Antoine de Bueil, son of Jean V de Bueil.

Under the Ancien Régime, the castle was bought by Louis XIV in 1666 and given in 1667 to his former mistress, Mademoiselle Louise de la Vallière; she became Duchesse de La Vallière et de Vaujours.

In the 18th century, Louise de la Vallière bequeathed it to the Davot family, who occupied the castle for a long period. The castle was abandoned during the French Revolution. In 1815, it was sold to Thomas Stanhope-Holland, who used it as a quarry.

The site was added to the list of monuments historiques on 24 October 1944, and the ruins were classified on 26 January 1989.

The site and castle are private property but offer guided-tours to the public.

== Architecture ==
The castle ruins stand in the valley of the Fare, south of Château-la-Vallière, close to the hamlet of Vaujours.

The castle, of typical military architecture, stands on a mound in the middle of a lake whose waters feed the moats which surround it. It is formed of two fortresses: a bailey to the west and the castle to the east.

The entry to the double enceinte is defended by two cylindrical towers and a flying bridge, flanked to the north by a bastion. A drawbridge and a postern flanked by a cylindrical tower to the north provide access to the courtyard. The residence is to the south, the ruins of the chapel to the north. To the east, the towers give access to a covered chemin de ronde and to the south the bastion connected to the fortress and a further building.

Inside the fortress the keep still exists, as does the lower courtyard. The enceinte includes several towers, some of which have rustication. The moats are drained and overgrown. The ruins have been cleared of vegetation and are surrounded by lawns and hedges.

== See also ==
- List of castles in France
