= Langeais =

- Commune
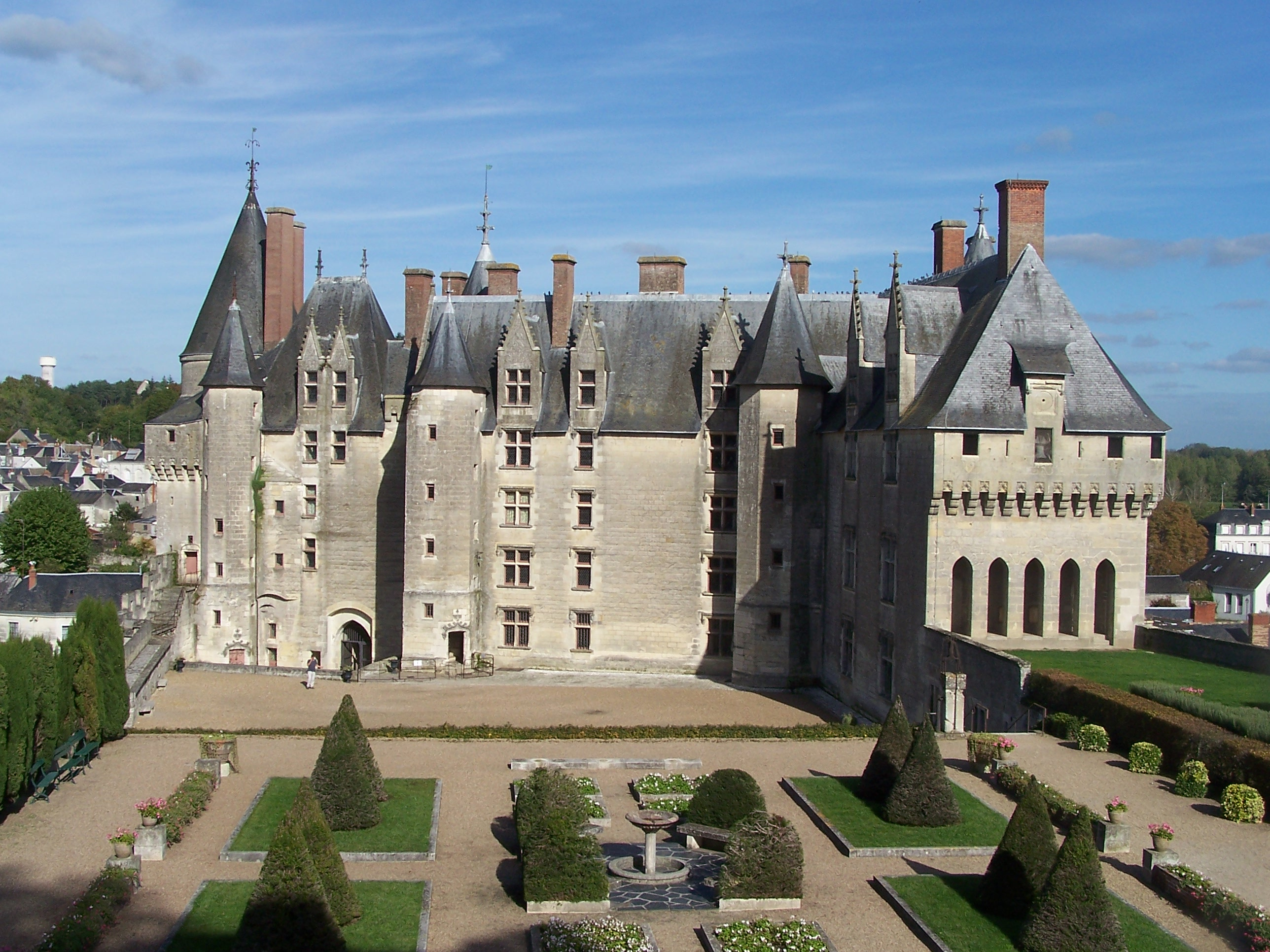
- Château de Langeais

- Coat of arms
- Location of Langeais
- Location within France Location within Centre-Val de Loire
- Coordinates: 47°19′36″N 0°24′25″E
- Country: France
- Region: Centre-Val de Loire
- Department: Indre-et-Loire
- Arrondissement: Chinon
- Canton: Langeais

Government
  - Mayor (2023–2026): Fabrice Ruel
- Area^{1}: 64.55 km^{2} (24.92 sq mi)
- Highest elevation: 109 m (358 ft)
- Lowest elevation: 36 m (118 ft)
- Population (2023): 4,367
  - Density: 67.65/km^{2} (175.2/sq mi)
- Time zone: UTC+01:00 (CET)
  - Summer (DST): UTC+02:00 (CEST)
- INSEE/Postal code: 37123 /37130
- ^{1} French Land Register data, which excludes lakes, ponds, glaciers > 1 km^{2} (0.386 sq mi or 247 acres) and river estuaries.

Langeais (French pronunciation: [lɑ̃ʒɛ]) is a commune in the Indre-et-Loire department in central France. On 1 January 2017, the former commune of Les Essards was merged into Langeais.

== Population ==
The population data in the table below refer to the commune of Langeais proper, in its geography at the given years.

Historical population

Year	Pop.	±% p.a.
1793	2,216	—
1800	2,205	−0.07%
1806	2,239	+0.26%
1821	2,499	+0.74%
1831	2,840	+1.29%
1836	3,057	+1.48%
1841	3,138	+0.52%
1846	3,565	+2.58%
1851	3,307	−1.49%
1856	3,234	−0.45%
1861	3,381	+0.89%
1866	3,604	+1.29%
1872	3,450	−0.73%
1876	3,463	+0.09%
1881	3,517	+0.31%
1886	3,446	−0.41%
1891	3,365	−0.47%
1896	3,309	−0.34%
1901	3,371	+0.37%

Year	Pop.	±% p.a.
1906	3,550	+1.04%
1911	3,467	−0.47%
1921	3,441	−0.08%
1926	3,450	+0.05%
1931	3,455	+0.03%
1936	3,400	−0.32%
1946	3,511	+0.32%
1954	3,652	+0.49%
1962	3,849	+0.66%
1968	3,907	+0.25%
1975	3,902	−0.02%
1982	4,142	+0.86%
1990	3,960	−0.56%
1999	3,865	−0.27%
2007	3,977	+0.36%
2012	4,157	+0.89%
2017	4,666	+2.34%
2023	4,367	−1.10%

Source: EHESS and INSEE (2007-2023)

== Sights ==
Langeais has a church of the 11th, 12th and 15th centuries, but is chiefly interesting for its large and historic château built soon after the middle of the 15th century by Jean Bourré, minister of Louis XI. Here the marriage of Charles VIII and Anne of Brittany took place in 1491. In the park, are the ruins of a keep of late 10th century architecture, built by Fulk Nerra (Black Hawk in old French), count of Anjou.

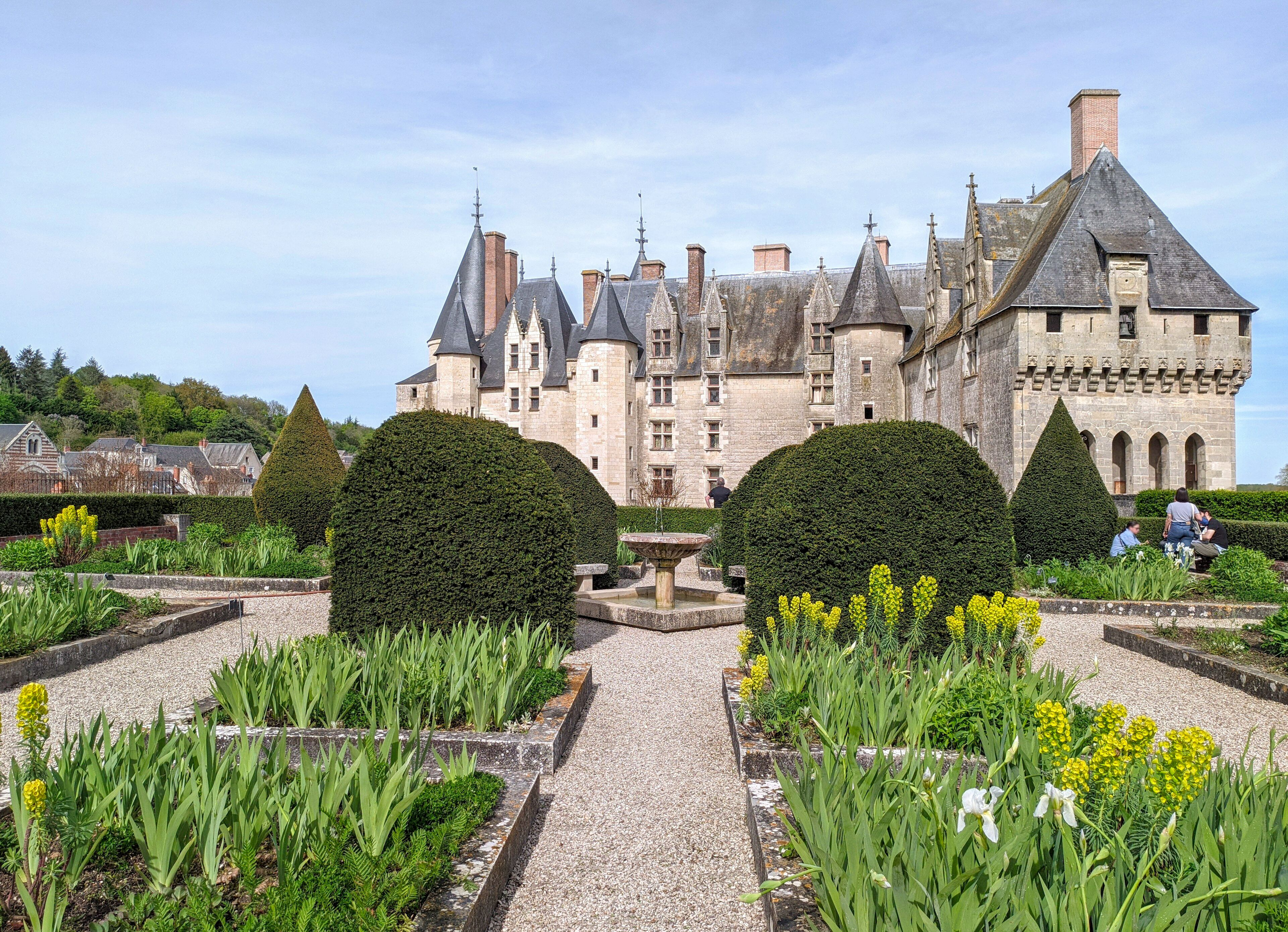
The castle garden

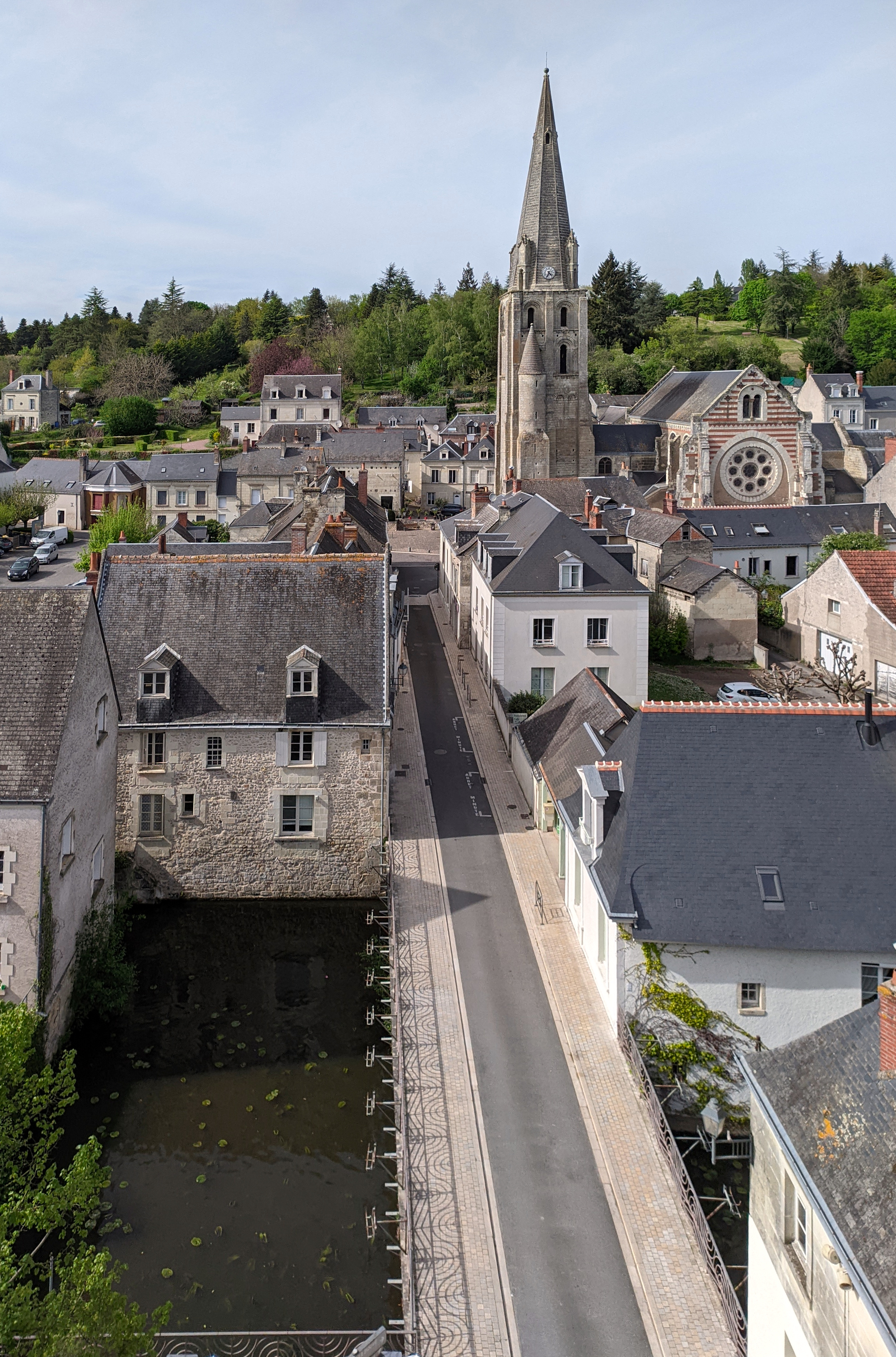
The town seen from the castle

== Transportation ==
Langeais is served by the A85 autoroute.

== International relations ==
Langeais is twinned with:

- Eppstein, Germany
- Gondar, Portugal
