= Rillé =

- Commune
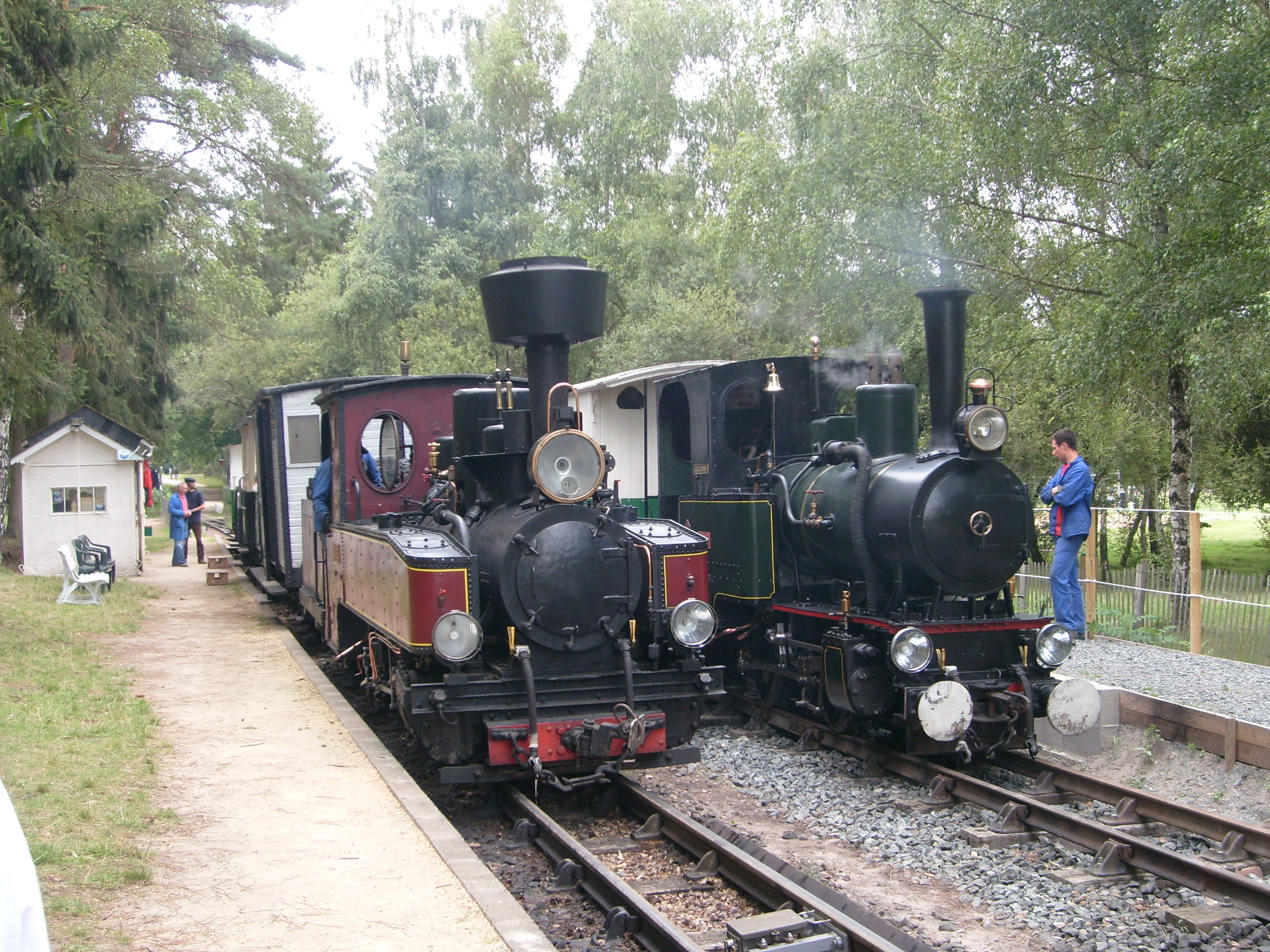
- The narrow-gauge railway in Rillé
- Location of Rillé
- Location within France Location within Centre-Val de Loire
- Coordinates: 47°27′03″N 0°14′57″E
- Country: France
- Region: Centre-Val de Loire
- Department: Indre-et-Loire
- Arrondissement: Chinon
- Canton: Langeais

Government
  - Mayor (2020–2026): Xavier Dupont
- Area^{1}: 23.96 km^{2} (9.25 sq mi)
- Highest elevation: 119 m (390 ft)
- Lowest elevation: 67 m (220 ft)
- Population (2023): 313
  - Density: 13.1/km^{2} (33.8/sq mi)
- Time zone: UTC+01:00 (CET)
  - Summer (DST): UTC+02:00 (CEST)
- INSEE/Postal code: 37198 /37340
- ^{1} French Land Register data, which excludes lakes, ponds, glaciers > 1 km^{2} (0.386 sq mi or 247 acres) and river estuaries.

Rillé (French pronunciation: [ʁije]) is a commune in the Indre-et-Loire department in central France.

== Population ==
Historical population
Year	Pop.	±% p.a.
1968	479	—
1975	406	−2.33%
1982	395	−0.39%
1990	275	−4.43%
1999	272	−0.12%
2007	287	+0.67%
2012	318	+2.07%
2017	306	−0.77%
2023	313	+0.38%
Source: INSEE

== See also ==
- Communes of the Indre-et-Loire department
- Ferme de la Briche
