= Mazières-de-Touraine =

- Commune
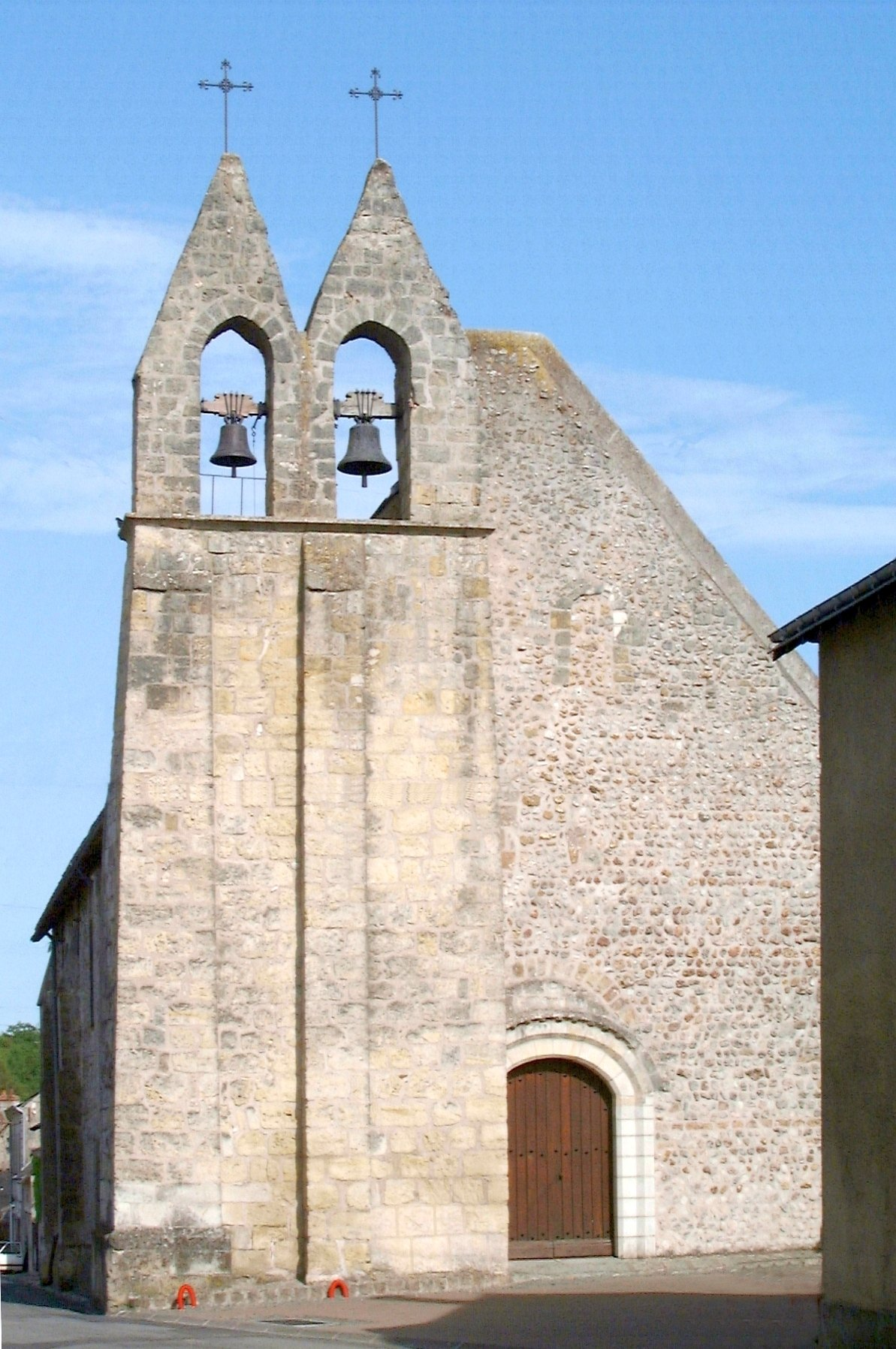
- The bell tower of the church in Mazières-de-Touraine
- Location of Mazières-de-Touraine
- Location within France Location within Centre-Val de Loire
- Coordinates: 47°23′02″N 0°25′36″E
- Country: France
- Region: Centre-Val de Loire
- Department: Indre-et-Loire
- Arrondissement: Chinon
- Canton: Langeais

Government
  - Mayor (2020–2026): Thierry Eloy
- Area^{1}: 34.18 km^{2} (13.20 sq mi)
- Highest elevation: 109 m (358 ft)
- Lowest elevation: 52 m (171 ft)
- Population (2023): 1,488
  - Density: 43.53/km^{2} (112.8/sq mi)
- Time zone: UTC+01:00 (CET)
  - Summer (DST): UTC+02:00 (CEST)
- INSEE/Postal code: 37150 /37130
- ^{1} French Land Register data, which excludes lakes, ponds, glaciers > 1 km^{2} (0.386 sq mi or 247 acres) and river estuaries.

Mazières-de-Touraine (French pronunciation: [mazjɛʁ də tuʁɛn], literally Mazières of Touraine) is a commune in the Indre-et-Loire department in central France.

== Population ==
Historical population
| Year | Pop. | ±% p.a. |
|---|---|---|
| 1968 | 664 | — |
| 1975 | 608 | −1.25% |
| 1982 | 705 | +2.14% |
| 1990 | 961 | +3.95% |
| 1999 | 1,022 | +0.69% |
| 2007 | 1,118 | +1.13% |
| 2012 | 1,323 | +3.42% |
| 2017 | 1,331 | +0.12% |
| 2023 | 1,488 | +1.88% |
Source: INSEE

== See also ==
- Communes of the Indre-et-Loire department
