= Coteaux-sur-Loire =

- Commune
- Location of Coteaux-sur-Loire
- Location within France Location within Centre-Val de Loire
- Coordinates: 47°17′13″N 0°18′29″E
- Country: France
- Region: Centre-Val de Loire
- Department: Indre-et-Loire
- Arrondissement: Chinon
- Canton: Langeais
- Intercommunality: Touraine Ouest Val de Loire
- Area^{1}: 44.15 km^{2} (17.05 sq mi)
- Population (2023): 1,867
  - Density: 42.29/km^{2} (109.5/sq mi)
- Time zone: UTC+01:00 (CET)
  - Summer (DST): UTC+02:00 (CEST)
- INSEE/Postal code: 37232 /37130, 37140
- ^{1} French Land Register data, which excludes lakes, ponds, glaciers > 1 km^{2} (0.386 sq mi or 247 acres) and river estuaries.

Coteaux-sur-Loire (French pronunciation: [kɔto syʁ lwaʁ], literally Hillsides on Loire) is a commune in the department of Indre-et-Loire, central France. The municipality was established on 1 January 2017 by merger of the former communes of Saint-Patrice (the seat), Ingrandes-de-Touraine and Saint-Michel-sur-Loire.

== See also ==
- Communes of the Indre-et-Loire department
