= Courcelles-de-Touraine =

- Commune
- Coat of arms
- Location of Courcelles-de-Touraine
- Location within France Location within Centre-Val de Loire
- Coordinates: 47°28′59″N 0°18′33″E
- Country: France
- Region: Centre-Val de Loire
- Department: Indre-et-Loire
- Arrondissement: Chinon
- Canton: Langeais

Government
  - Mayor (2020–2026): Philippe Adet
- Area^{1}: 25.71 km^{2} (9.93 sq mi)
- Highest elevation: 110 m (360 ft)
- Lowest elevation: 79 m (259 ft)
- Population (2023): 483
  - Density: 18.8/km^{2} (48.7/sq mi)
- Time zone: UTC+01:00 (CET)
  - Summer (DST): UTC+02:00 (CEST)
- INSEE/Postal code: 37086 /37330
- ^{1} French Land Register data, which excludes lakes, ponds, glaciers > 1 km^{2} (0.386 sq mi or 247 acres) and river estuaries.

Courcelles-de-Touraine (French pronunciation: [kuʁsɛl də tuʁɛn], literally Courcelles of Touraine) is a commune in the Indre-et-Loire department in central France.

== Population ==
Historical population
Year	Pop.	±% p.a.
1968	444	—
1975	374	−2.42%
1982	360	−0.54%
1990	298	−2.33%
1999	325	+0.97%
2007	420	+3.26%
2012	511	+4.00%
2017	494	−0.67%
2023	483	−0.37%
Source: INSEE

== See also ==
- Communes of the Indre-et-Loire department
