= Château-la-Vallière =

- Commune
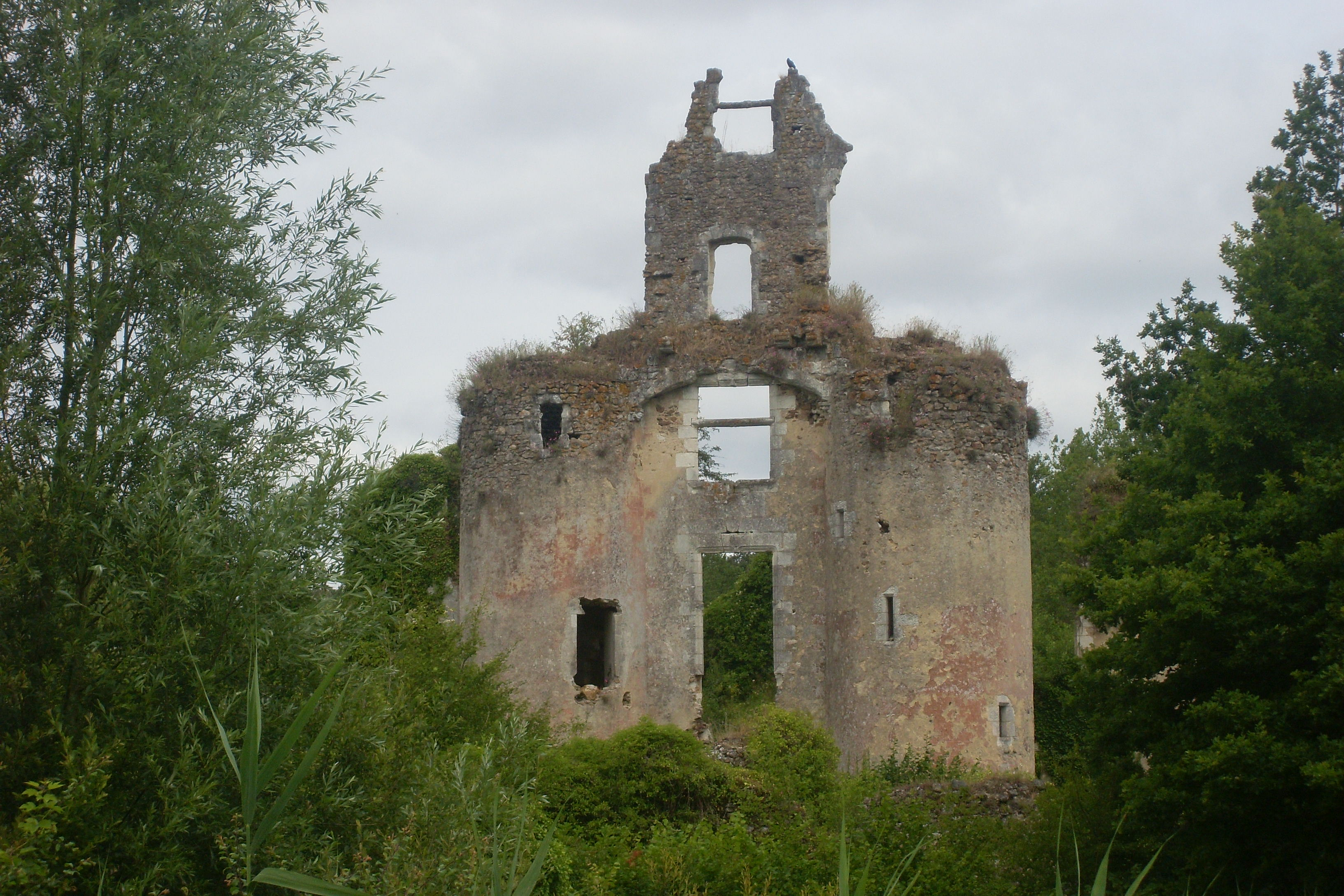
- Ruins of the chateau of Vaujours

- Coat of arms
- Location of Château-la-Vallière
- Location within France Location within Centre-Val de Loire
- Coordinates: 47°32′52″N 0°19′33″E
- Country: France
- Region: Centre-Val de Loire
- Department: Indre-et-Loire
- Arrondissement: Chinon
- Canton: Langeais

Government
  - Mayor (2020–2026): Jean-Claude Gauthier
- Area^{1}: 21.94 km^{2} (8.47 sq mi)
- Highest elevation: 110 m (360 ft)
- Lowest elevation: 58 m (190 ft)
- Population (2023): 1,734
  - Density: 79.03/km^{2} (204.7/sq mi)
- Time zone: UTC+01:00 (CET)
  - Summer (DST): UTC+02:00 (CEST)
- INSEE/Postal code: 37062 /37330
- ^{1} French Land Register data, which excludes lakes, ponds, glaciers > 1 km^{2} (0.386 sq mi or 247 acres) and river estuaries.

Château-la-Vallière (French: [ʃɑto la valjɛʁ]) is a commune in the Indre-et-Loire department in central France.

== Château de Vaujours ==
The Château de Vaujours, situated 3 kilometres south of Château-la-Vallière, is an ancient fortress from the 12th to 15th centuries. It belonged to the manor of Chasteaux-en-Anjou, the future Château-la-Vallière. It was built to protect the eastern borders of Anjou.

== Population ==
Historical population
Year	Pop.	±% p.a.
1968	1,552	—
1975	1,611	+0.53%
1982	1,646	+0.31%
1990	1,500	−1.15%
1999	1,553	+0.39%
2007	1,605	+0.41%
2012	1,674	+0.85%
2017	1,780	+1.24%
2023	1,734	−0.44%
Source: INSEE

== Personalities ==
Jean Schubnel (born in Château-la-Vallière 24 June 1894; died 1987) was a 20th-century French naive painter.

== See also ==
- Communes of the Indre-et-Loire department
