= Saint-Laurent-de-Lin =

- Commune
- Coat of arms
- Location of Saint-Laurent-de-Lin
- Location within France Location within Centre-Val de Loire
- Coordinates: 47°30′28″N 0°15′32″E
- Country: France
- Region: Centre-Val de Loire
- Department: Indre-et-Loire
- Arrondissement: Chinon
- Canton: Langeais

Government
  - Mayor (2020–2026): Jean-Paul Sorin
- Area^{1}: 13.86 km^{2} (5.35 sq mi)
- Highest elevation: 119 m (390 ft)
- Lowest elevation: 64 m (210 ft)
- Population (2023): 347
  - Density: 25.0/km^{2} (64.8/sq mi)
- Time zone: UTC+01:00 (CET)
  - Summer (DST): UTC+02:00 (CEST)
- INSEE/Postal code: 37223 /37330
- ^{1} French Land Register data, which excludes lakes, ponds, glaciers > 1 km^{2} (0.386 sq mi or 247 acres) and river estuaries.

Saint-Laurent-de-Lin (French pronunciation: [sɛ̃ loʁɑ̃ də lɛ̃]) is a commune in the Indre-et-Loire department in central France.

== Population ==
Historical population
Year	Pop.	±% p.a.
1968	328	—
1975	316	−0.53%
1982	267	−2.38%
1990	227	−2.01%
1999	234	+0.34%
2007	260	+1.33%
2012	330	+4.88%
2017	322	−0.49%
2023	347	+1.25%
Source: INSEE

== See also ==
- Communes of the Indre-et-Loire department
