= Brèches =

- Commune
- Location of Brèches
- Location within France Location within Centre-Val de Loire
- Coordinates: 47°34′14″N 0°23′22″E
- Country: France
- Region: Centre-Val de Loire
- Department: Indre-et-Loire
- Arrondissement: Chinon
- Canton: Langeais

Government
  - Mayor (2020–2026): Gérard Vignas
- Area^{1}: 11.63 km^{2} (4.49 sq mi)
- Highest elevation: 133 m (436 ft)
- Lowest elevation: 74 m (243 ft)
- Population (2023): 239
  - Density: 20.6/km^{2} (53.2/sq mi)
- Time zone: UTC+01:00 (CET)
  - Summer (DST): UTC+02:00 (CEST)
- INSEE/Postal code: 37037 /37330
- ^{1} French Land Register data, which excludes lakes, ponds, glaciers > 1 km^{2} (0.386 sq mi or 247 acres) and river estuaries.

Brèches (French pronunciation: [bʁɛʃ]) is a commune in the Indre-et-Loire department in central France.

== Population ==
Historical population
Year	Pop.	±% p.a.
1968	300	—
1975	236	−3.37%
1982	250	+0.83%
1990	241	−0.46%
1999	255	+0.63%
2007	282	+1.27%
2012	293	+0.77%
2017	248	−3.28%
2023	239	−0.61%
Source: INSEE

== See also ==
- Communes of the Indre-et-Loire department
