= Marcilly-sur-Maulne =

- Commune
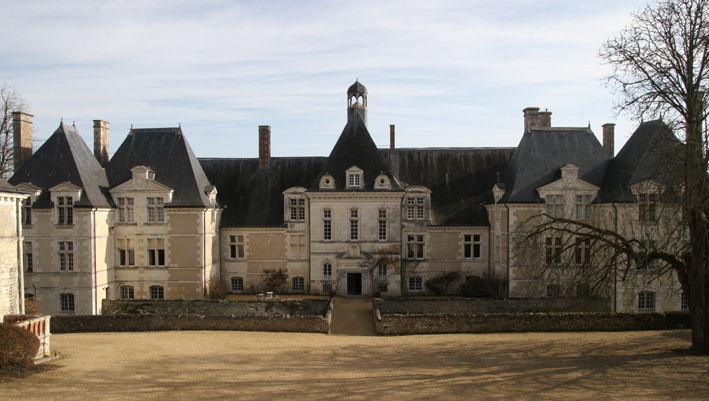
- Chateau

- Coat of arms
- Location of Marcilly-sur-Maulne
- Location within France Location within Centre-Val de Loire
- Coordinates: 47°33′05″N 0°14′32″E
- Country: France
- Region: Centre-Val de Loire
- Department: Indre-et-Loire
- Arrondissement: Chinon
- Canton: Langeais

Government
  - Mayor (2020–2026): Dominique Guinoiseau
- Area^{1}: 14.6 km^{2} (5.6 sq mi)
- Highest elevation: 121 m (397 ft)
- Lowest elevation: 47 m (154 ft)
- Population (2023): 222
  - Density: 15.2/km^{2} (39.4/sq mi)
- Time zone: UTC+01:00 (CET)
  - Summer (DST): UTC+02:00 (CEST)
- INSEE/Postal code: 37146 /37330
- ^{1} French Land Register data, which excludes lakes, ponds, glaciers > 1 km^{2} (0.386 sq mi or 247 acres) and river estuaries.

Marcilly-sur-Maulne is a commune in the Indre-et-Loire department in central France.

== Population ==
Historical population
Year	Pop.	±% p.a.
1968	315	—
1975	275	−1.92%
1982	245	−1.64%
1990	241	−0.21%
1999	237	−0.19%
2007	246	+0.47%
2012	226	−1.68%
2017	230	+0.35%
2023	222	−0.59%
Source: INSEE

== See also ==
- Communes of the Indre-et-Loire department
