= Braye-sur-Maulne =

- Commune
- Coat of arms
- Location of Braye-sur-Maulne
- Location within France Location within Centre-Val de Loire
- Coordinates: 47°33′22″N 0°14′58″E
- Country: France
- Region: Centre-Val de Loire
- Department: Indre-et-Loire
- Arrondissement: Chinon
- Canton: Langeais

Government
  - Mayor (2020–2026): Cécile Fergeau
- Area^{1}: 11.84 km^{2} (4.57 sq mi)
- Highest elevation: 121 m (397 ft)
- Lowest elevation: 50 m (160 ft)
- Population (2023): 199
  - Density: 16.8/km^{2} (43.5/sq mi)
- Time zone: UTC+01:00 (CET)
  - Summer (DST): UTC+02:00 (CEST)
- INSEE/Postal code: 37036 /37330
- ^{1} French Land Register data, which excludes lakes, ponds, glaciers > 1 km^{2} (0.386 sq mi or 247 acres) and river estuaries.

Braye-sur-Maulne is a commune in the Indre-et-Loire department in central France.

== Population ==
Historical population
Year	Pop.	±% p.a.
1968	258	—
1975	220	−2.25%
1982	187	−2.29%
1990	197	+0.65%
1999	205	+0.44%
2007	221	+0.94%
2012	216	−0.46%
2017	172	−4.45%
2023	199	+2.46%
Source: INSEE

== See also ==
- Communes of the Indre-et-Loire department
