= Villiers-au-Bouin =

- Commune
- Coat of arms
- Location of Villiers-au-Bouin
- Location within France Location within Centre-Val de Loire
- Coordinates: 47°34′32″N 0°18′49″E
- Country: France
- Region: Centre-Val de Loire
- Department: Indre-et-Loire
- Arrondissement: Chinon
- Canton: Langeais

Government
  - Mayor (2020–2026): Daniel Samedi
- Area^{1}: 29.83 km^{2} (11.52 sq mi)
- Highest elevation: 114 m (374 ft)
- Lowest elevation: 52 m (171 ft)
- Population (2023): 727
  - Density: 24.4/km^{2} (63.1/sq mi)
- Time zone: UTC+01:00 (CET)
  - Summer (DST): UTC+02:00 (CEST)
- INSEE/Postal code: 37279 /37330
- ^{1} French Land Register data, which excludes lakes, ponds, glaciers > 1 km^{2} (0.386 sq mi or 247 acres) and river estuaries.

Villiers-au-Bouin (French pronunciation: [vilje o bwɛ̃]) is a commune in the Indre-et-Loire department in central France.

== Population ==
Historical population
Year	Pop.	±% p.a.
1968	721	—
1975	732	+0.22%
1982	759	+0.52%
1990	677	−1.42%
1999	601	−1.31%
2007	762	+3.01%
2012	780	+0.47%
2017	756	−0.62%
2023	727	−0.65%
Source: INSEE

== See also ==
- Communes of the Indre-et-Loire department
