= Cléré-les-Pins =

- Commune
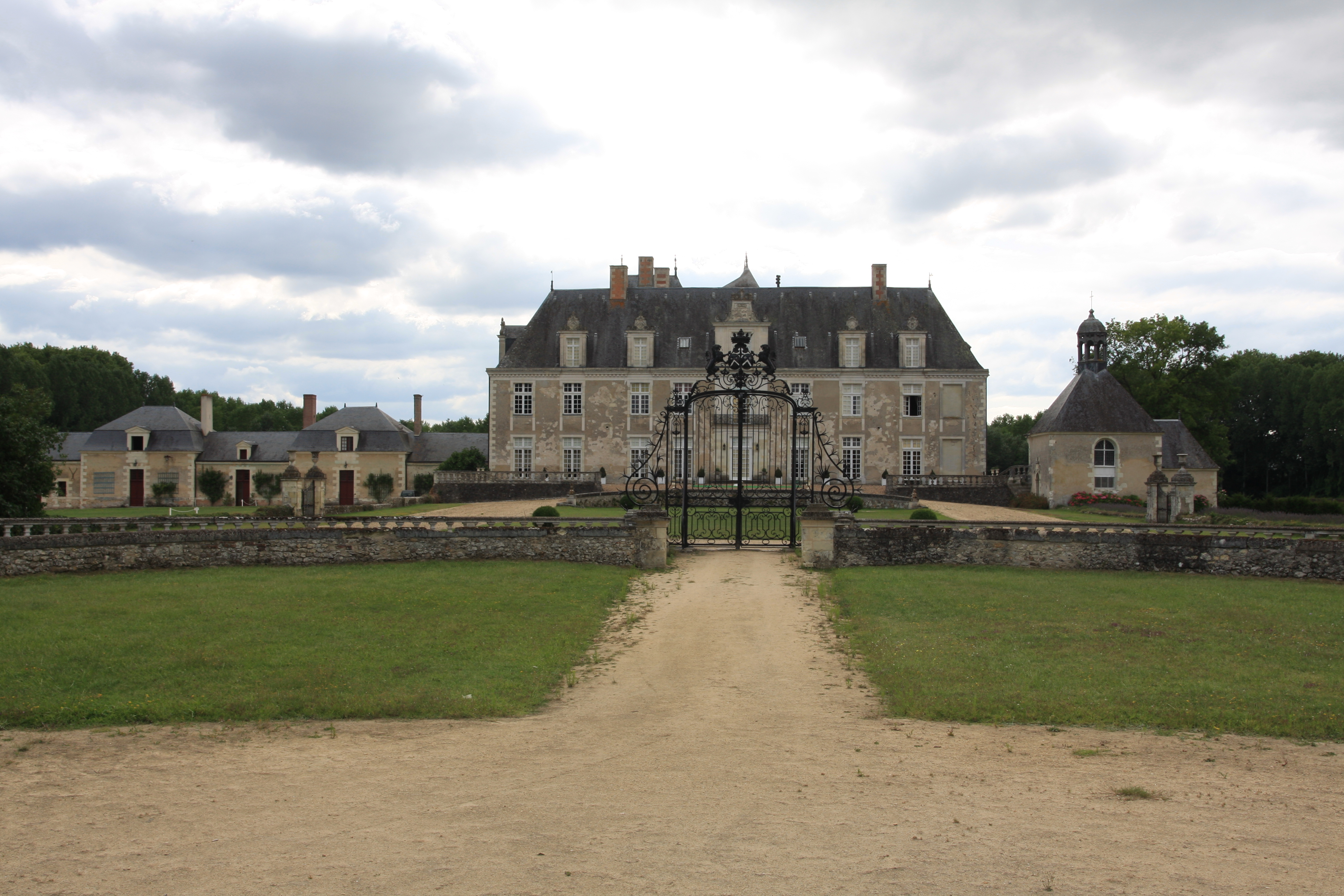
- Chateau of Champchevrier
- Location of Cléré-les-Pins
- Location within France Location within Centre-Val de Loire
- Coordinates: 47°25′34″N 0°23′30″E
- Country: France
- Region: Centre-Val de Loire
- Department: Indre-et-Loire
- Arrondissement: Chinon
- Canton: Langeais

Government
  - Mayor (2020–2026): Benoît Barot
- Area^{1}: 35.62 km^{2} (13.75 sq mi)
- Highest elevation: 111 m (364 ft)
- Lowest elevation: 80 m (260 ft)
- Population (2023): 1,429
  - Density: 40.12/km^{2} (103.9/sq mi)
- Time zone: UTC+01:00 (CET)
  - Summer (DST): UTC+02:00 (CEST)
- INSEE/Postal code: 37081 /37340
- ^{1} French Land Register data, which excludes lakes, ponds, glaciers > 1 km^{2} (0.386 sq mi or 247 acres) and river estuaries.

Cléré-les-Pins (French pronunciation: [kleʁe le pɛ̃]) is a commune in the Indre-et-Loire department in central France.

== Population ==
Historical population
Year	Pop.	±% p.a.
1968	909	—
1975	797	−1.86%
1982	891	+1.61%
1990	1,049	+2.06%
1999	1,166	+1.18%
2007	1,201	+0.37%
2012	1,380	+2.82%
2017	1,410	+0.43%
2023	1,429	+0.22%
Source: INSEE

== See also ==
- Communes of the Indre-et-Loire department
