= Ferme de la Briche =

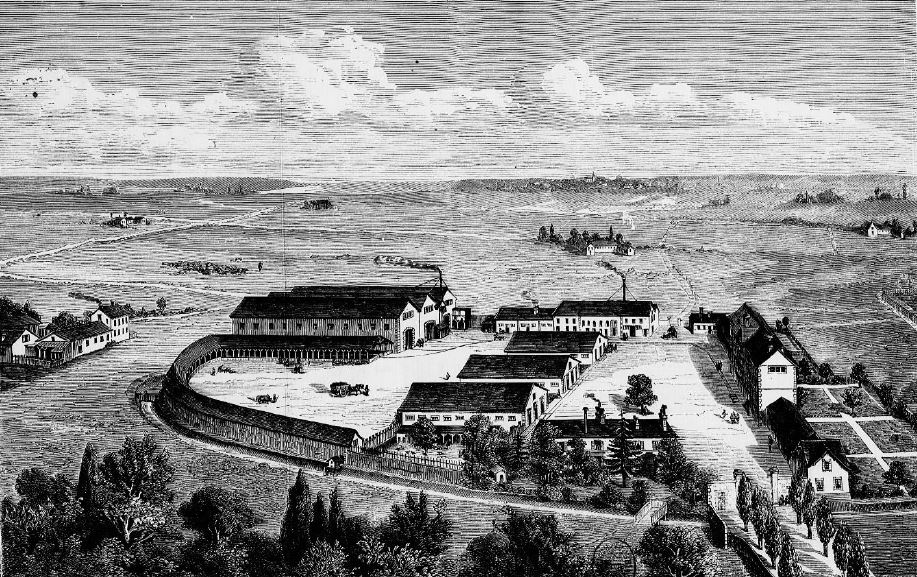
- Artist's view of part of the estate to the north, 1867

- Location within France Location within Centre-Val de Loire
- 47.426944°N 0.248333°E

History
- Built: 1857
- Built for: Cattle breeding and sugar beet cultivation

Site notes
- Architect: Jean-François Cail
- Architectural styles: Agricultural and industrial buildings

Ferme de la Briche was a farm located on the territory of Rillé and neighbouring communes in the north-west of the department of Indre-et-Loire in the Centre-Val de Loire region of France.

It was founded in 1857 by Jean-François Cail, a manufacturer of sugar factory equipment and locomotive construction, who wanted to apply the principle of vertical integration to agriculture. The exploitation of the estate, which covered more than 1,600 ha in a single block at its peak, is based on cattle breeding and sugar beet cultivation. Imposing buildings make up a central farm on four hectares controlling seven satellite farms. The main products of the estate were sugar extracted from beets and alcohol from the distillation of beets and grains, as well as beef animals, cattle and sheep. 350 to 400 people were employed there year-round, in addition to seasonal workers.

The profitability of the farm, although fragile, was established from the mid-1860s to the end of the 19th century and the technical success, sanctioned by awards (departmental agricultural competition of 1864, Exposition Universelle (1878)), is undeniable at that time (soils sustainably recultivated, increased yields). However, competition from sugar beet farms in the North of France and the rise of labour costs put the estate in difficulty, and it was gradually broken up, with the family of its founder separating for good in 1981. Only part of the grain stores and the distillery remain from the central farm, as well as some ruined walls of the barn. The network of drains and ditches is still in place in the 21st century.
