= Lathon =

Lathon is a surname. Notable people with the surname include:

- Lamar Lathon (born 1967), American football player
- Ray Lathon (1966–2000), American boxer

== See also ==
- Lathan (name)
