= Channay-sur-Lathan =

- Commune
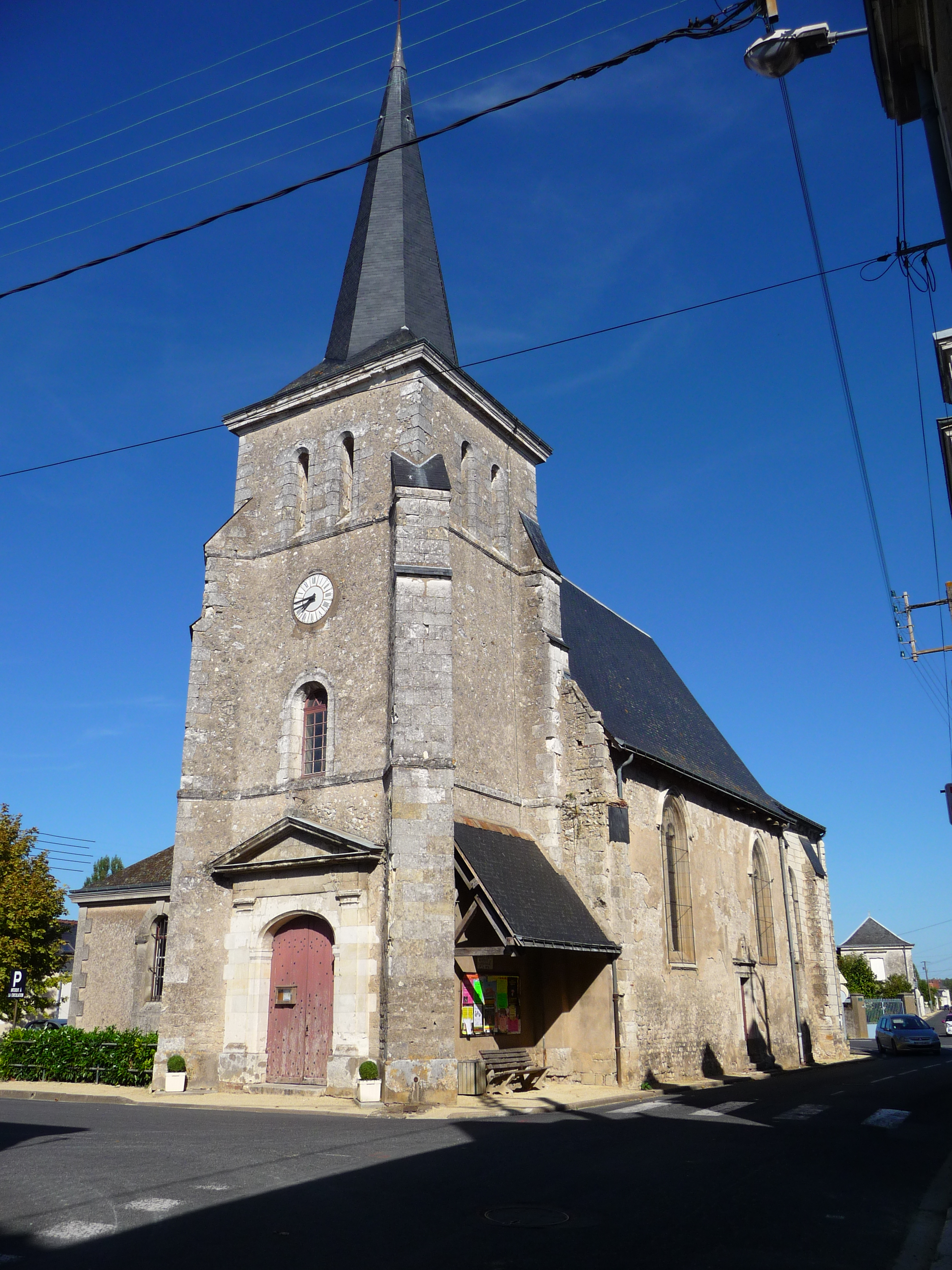
- The church in Channay-sur-Lathan
- Location of Channay-sur-Lathan
- Location within France Location within Centre-Val de Loire
- Coordinates: 47°28′51″N 0°15′52″E
- Country: France
- Region: Centre-Val de Loire
- Department: Indre-et-Loire
- Arrondissement: Chinon
- Canton: Langeais

Government
  - Mayor (2020–2026): Isabelle Mélo
- Area^{1}: 28.71 km^{2} (11.08 sq mi)
- Highest elevation: 91 m (299 ft)
- Lowest elevation: 71 m (233 ft)
- Population (2023): 803
  - Density: 28.0/km^{2} (72.4/sq mi)
- Time zone: UTC+01:00 (CET)
  - Summer (DST): UTC+02:00 (CEST)
- INSEE/Postal code: 37055 /37330
- ^{1} French Land Register data, which excludes lakes, ponds, glaciers > 1 km^{2} (0.386 sq mi or 247 acres) and river estuaries.

Channay-sur-Lathan (French pronunciation: [ʃanɛ syʁ latɑ̃]) is a commune in the Indre-et-Loire department in central France.

== Population ==
Historical population
Year	Pop.	±% p.a.
1968	792	—
1975	666	−2.44%
1982	569	−2.22%
1990	578	+0.20%
1999	595	+0.32%
2007	789	+3.59%
2012	832	+1.07%
2017	841	+0.22%
2023	803	−0.77%
Source: INSEE

== See also ==
- Communes of the Indre-et-Loire department
