= La Chapelle-sur-Loire =

- Commune
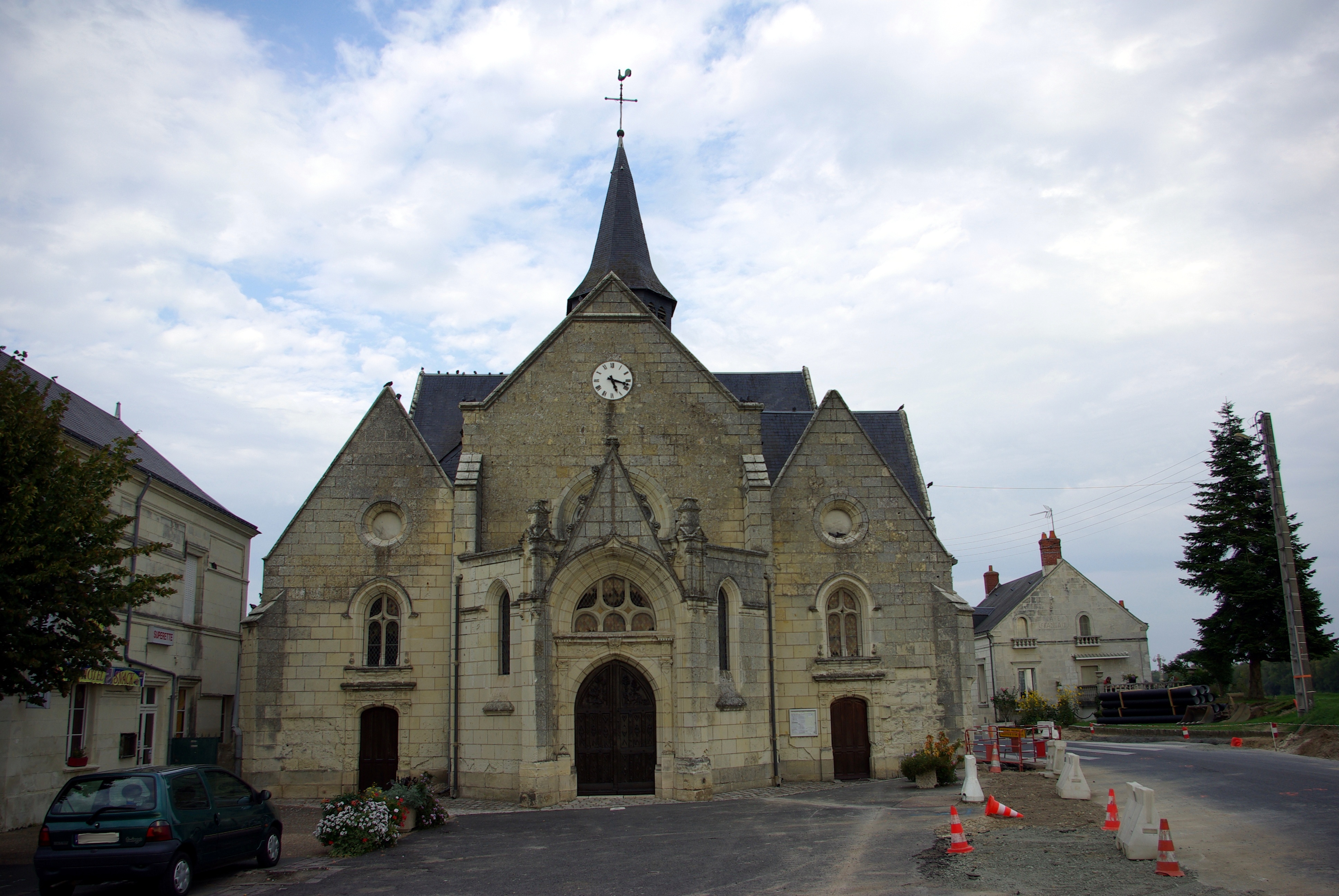
- The church of the Translation of Saint-Martin, in La-Chapelle-sur-Loire
- Location of La Chapelle-sur-Loire
- Location within France Location within Centre-Val de Loire
- Coordinates: 47°14′58″N 0°13′29″E
- Country: France
- Region: Centre-Val de Loire
- Department: Indre-et-Loire
- Arrondissement: Chinon
- Canton: Langeais

Government
  - Mayor (2020–2026): Paul Guignard
- Area^{1}: 19.17 km^{2} (7.40 sq mi)
- Highest elevation: 37 m (121 ft)
- Lowest elevation: 27 m (89 ft)
- Population (2023): 1,468
  - Density: 76.58/km^{2} (198.3/sq mi)
- Time zone: UTC+01:00 (CET)
  - Summer (DST): UTC+02:00 (CEST)
- INSEE/Postal code: 37058 /37140
- ^{1} French Land Register data, which excludes lakes, ponds, glaciers > 1 km^{2} (0.386 sq mi or 247 acres) and river estuaries.

La Chapelle-sur-Loire (French pronunciation: [la ʃapɛl syʁ lwaʁ], literally The Chapel on Loire) is a commune in the Indre-et-Loire department in central France.

== Population ==
Historical population
Year	Pop.	±% p.a.
1968	1,472	—
1975	1,275	−2.03%
1982	1,385	+1.19%
1990	1,386	+0.01%
1999	1,481	+0.74%
2007	1,544	+0.52%
2012	1,497	−0.62%
2017	1,433	−0.87%
2023	1,468	+0.40%
Source: INSEE

== See also ==
- Communes of the Indre-et-Loire department
