= Savigné-sur-Lathan =

- Commune
- Coat of arms
- Location of Savigné-sur-Lathan
- Location within France Location within Centre-Val de Loire
- Coordinates: 47°26′43″N 0°19′16″E
- Country: France
- Region: Centre-Val de Loire
- Department: Indre-et-Loire
- Arrondissement: Chinon
- Canton: Langeais

Government
  - Mayor (2020–2026): Hugues Brun
- Area^{1}: 17.61 km^{2} (6.80 sq mi)
- Highest elevation: 95 m (312 ft)
- Lowest elevation: 79 m (259 ft)
- Population (2023): 1,305
  - Density: 74.11/km^{2} (191.9/sq mi)
- Time zone: UTC+01:00 (CET)
  - Summer (DST): UTC+02:00 (CEST)
- INSEE/Postal code: 37241 /37340
- ^{1} French Land Register data, which excludes lakes, ponds, glaciers > 1 km^{2} (0.386 sq mi or 247 acres) and river estuaries.

Savigné-sur-Lathan (French pronunciation: [saviɲe syʁ latɑ̃]) is a commune in the Indre-et-Loire department in central France.

== Population ==
Historical population
Year	Pop.	±% p.a.
1968	926	—
1975	894	−0.50%
1982	938	+0.69%
1990	1,033	+1.21%
1999	1,049	+0.17%
2007	1,322	+2.93%
2012	1,360	+0.57%
2017	1,349	−0.16%
2023	1,305	−0.55%
Source: INSEE

== See also ==
- Communes of the Indre-et-Loire department
