= Lathan (name) =

Lathan may refer to the following people:

== Given name ==
- Lathan McKay, American curator, producer, actor, writer, and entrepreneur
- Lathan Ransom (born 2002), American football player
- Lathan Devers, a character from the Foundation series by Isaac Asimov

== Surname ==
- Christina Lathan (born 1958), East German sprinter
- Corinna E. Lathan, American engineer and businesswoman
- Dwayne Lathan (born 1989), American basketball player
- George Lathan (1875–1942), British trade unionist and politician
- Raymond Lee Lathan, American politician
- Sanaa Lathan (born 1971), American actress and voice actress
- Stan Lathan (born 1945), American television and film director and television producer
- Terry Lathan, American school teacher and political activist
- Trayvon Lathan (born 1984), American basketball player

== See also ==
- Lathon
