= Ingrandes-de-Touraine =

- Part of Coteaux-sur-Loire
- Location of Ingrandes-de-Touraine
- Location within France Location within Centre-Val de Loire
- Coordinates: 47°17′01″N 0°16′02″E
- Country: France
- Region: Centre-Val de Loire
- Department: Indre-et-Loire
- Arrondissement: Chinon
- Canton: Langeais
- Commune: Coteaux-sur-Loire
- Area^{1}: 9.46 km^{2} (3.65 sq mi)
- Highest elevation: 113 m (371 ft)
- Lowest elevation: 33 m (108 ft)
- Population (2019): 542
  - Density: 57.3/km^{2} (148/sq mi)
- Time zone: UTC+01:00 (CET)
  - Summer (DST): UTC+02:00 (CEST)
- Postal code: 37140
- ^{1} French Land Register data, which excludes lakes, ponds, glaciers > 1 km^{2} (0.386 sq mi or 247 acres) and river estuaries.

Ingrandes-de-Touraine (French pronunciation: [ɛ̃gʁɑ̃d də tuʁɛn], literally Ingrandes of Touraine) is a former commune in the Indre-et-Loire department in central France. On 1 January 2017, it was merged into the new commune Coteaux-sur-Loire.

== Population ==
Historical population

Year	Pop.	±% p.a.
1793	730	—
1821	788	+0.27%
1846	710	−0.42%
1872	651	−0.33%
1901	653	+0.01%
1926	483	−1.20%
1946	515	+0.32%
1962	517	+0.02%

Year	Pop.	±% p.a.
1968	487	−0.99%
1975	476	−0.33%
1982	512	+1.05%
1990	474	−0.96%
1999	469	−0.12%
2006	504	+1.03%
2019	542	+0.56%

Source: EHESS and INSEE

== See also ==
- Communes of the Indre-et-Loire department
