= Chouzé-sur-Loire =

- Commune
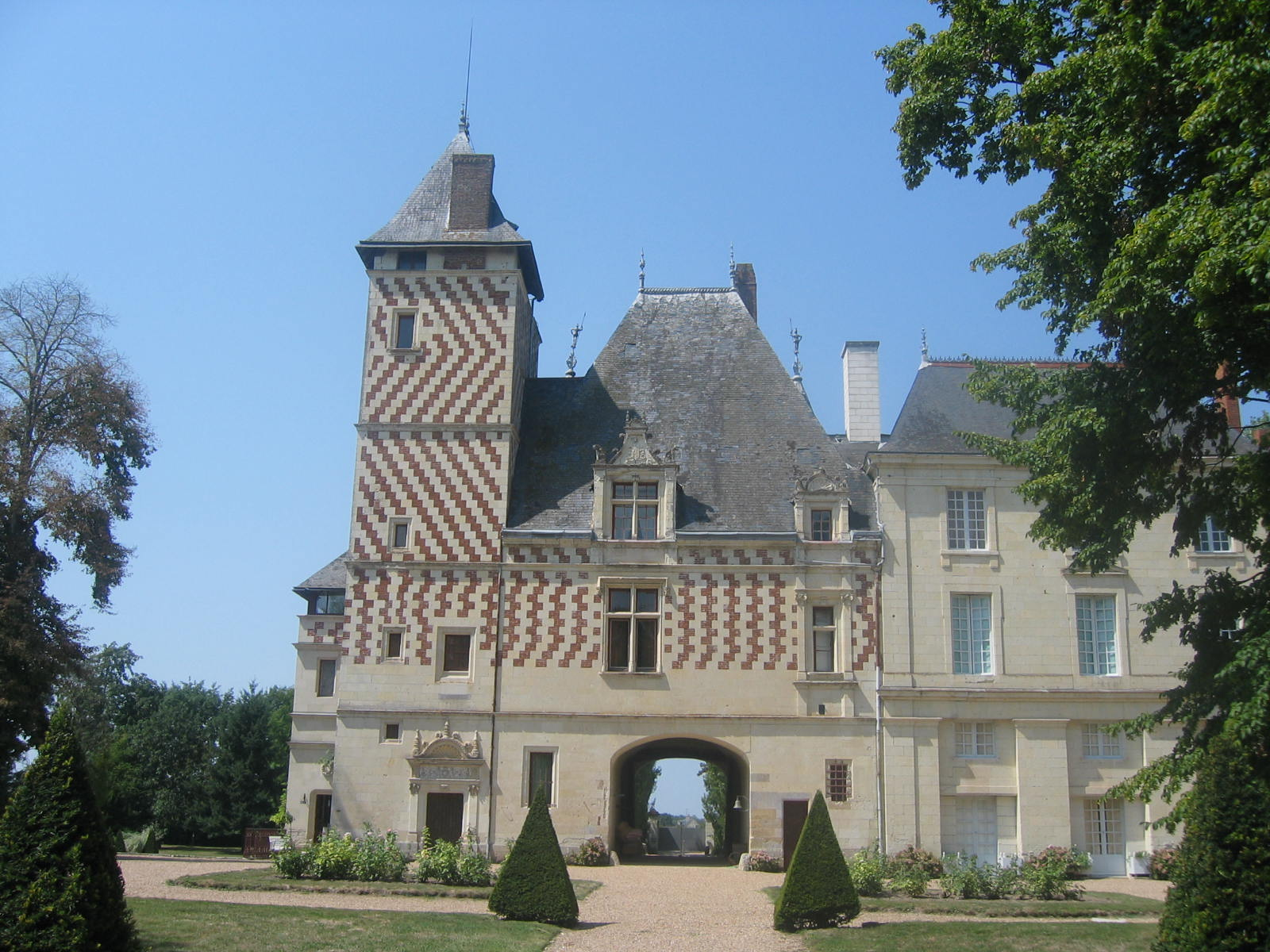
- Chateau of Réaux
- Location of Chouzé-sur-Loire
- Location within France Location within Centre-Val de Loire
- Coordinates: 47°14′14″N 0°07′40″E
- Country: France
- Region: Centre-Val de Loire
- Department: Indre-et-Loire
- Arrondissement: Chinon
- Canton: Langeais

Government
  - Mayor (2020–2026): Gilles Thibault
- Area^{1}: 28.04 km^{2} (10.83 sq mi)
- Highest elevation: 36 m (118 ft)
- Lowest elevation: 25 m (82 ft)
- Population (2023): 2,132
  - Density: 76.03/km^{2} (196.9/sq mi)
- Time zone: UTC+01:00 (CET)
  - Summer (DST): UTC+02:00 (CEST)
- INSEE/Postal code: 37074 /37140
- ^{1} French Land Register data, which excludes lakes, ponds, glaciers > 1 km^{2} (0.386 sq mi or 247 acres) and river estuaries.

Chouzé-sur-Loire (French pronunciation: [ʃuze syʁ lwaʁ], literally Chouzé on Loire) is a commune in the Indre-et-Loire department in central France.

== Population ==
Historical population

Year	Pop.	±% p.a.
1793	3,314	—
1800	3,447	+0.56%
1806	3,916	+2.15%
1821	3,660	−0.45%
1831	3,890	+0.61%
1836	3,847	−0.22%
1841	3,852	+0.03%
1846	3,816	−0.19%
1851	3,690	−0.67%
1856	3,571	−0.65%
1861	3,410	−0.92%
1866	3,323	−0.52%
1872	3,104	−1.13%
1876	2,902	−1.67%
1881	2,731	−1.21%
1886	2,643	−0.65%
1891	2,524	−0.92%
1896	2,419	−0.85%
1901	2,196	−1.92%

Year	Pop.	±% p.a.
1906	2,202	+0.05%
1911	2,139	−0.58%
1921	2,004	−0.65%
1926	2,004	+0.00%
1931	1,931	−0.74%
1936	1,882	−0.51%
1946	1,933	+0.27%
1954	2,006	+0.46%
1962	2,454	+2.55%
1968	2,255	−1.40%
1975	2,147	−0.70%
1982	2,070	−0.52%
1990	2,124	+0.32%
1999	2,093	−0.16%
2007	2,079	−0.08%
2012	2,095	+0.15%
2017	2,081	−0.13%
2023	2,132	+0.40%

Source: EHESS and INSEE (1968-2023)

== See also ==
- Communes of the Indre-et-Loire department
