= Chinon AOC =

Wine region in Touraine, France

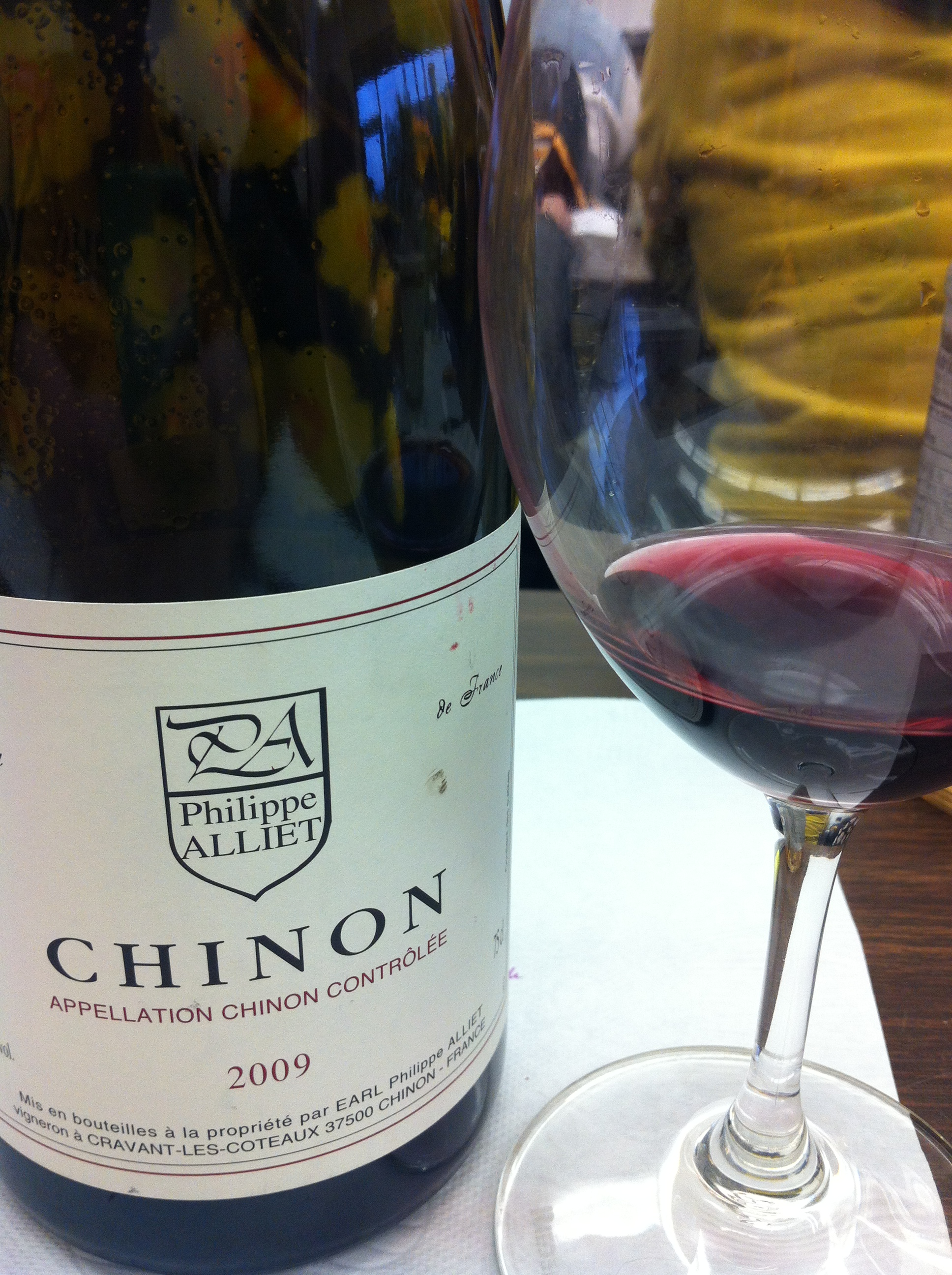
An AOC Chinon wine

Chinon wine (French pronunciation: [ʃinɔ̃]) comes from the vineyards around the town of Chinon in Touraine. Unusually for the Loire Valley, it is mostly red wine, with 2–5% rosé and a little white wine.

== Geography ==
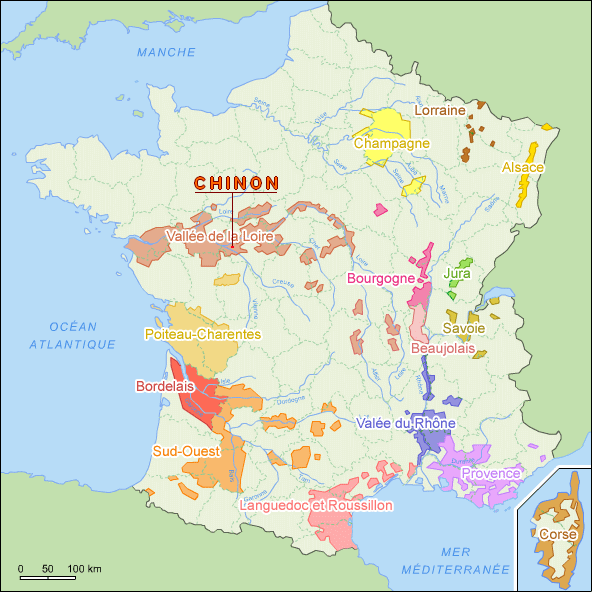
AOC Chinon in France

The town of Chinon is situated on the banks of the River Vienne in Indre-et-Loire. The vineyards of the Chinon AOC cover the relatively steep banks of the Vienne as well as the less steep slopes running northward from the hills above Chinon to the Loire. The vineyards consist almost entirely of erosional scree and gravels on top of rather hard Turonian limestones. Toward the Loire itself, the Turonian limestones give way to the Jurassic rock of the Loire.

== Styles ==
The reds and rosés are generally made from Cabernet Franc, although up to 25% of Cabernet Sauvignon is permitted. They are typically dry and light to medium bodied and go well with food. In good vintages the red wines can be cellared for 10 years or more. Cabernet Franc grown on the stony terraces of the area tends to be a young wine with dominant notes of blackcurrant and anise. The grapes from the steeper rockier areas along the hills that separate the Loire from the Vienne tend to produce wines that are more tannic and express the more austere terroir in a range of alkaloid flavors that give the wines a mineral, gamey complexity and a strong tannic backbone. These wines also tend to develop a velvety depth of spice flavors as they age. Though typically thought of as lighter wines, reds from good producers and strong vintages can be full bodied and well structured for aging. Their whites are composed primarily of Chenin blanc. They are typically described as dry, soft, light, and fresh.
