= Saint-Patrice =

- Part of Coteaux-sur-Loire
- Coat of arms
- Location of Saint-Patrice
- Location within France Location within Centre-Val de Loire
- Coordinates: 47°17′14″N 0°18′27″E
- Country: France
- Region: Centre-Val de Loire
- Department: Indre-et-Loire
- Arrondissement: Chinon
- Canton: Langeais
- Commune: Coteaux-sur-Loire
- Area^{1}: 17.18 km^{2} (6.63 sq mi)
- Highest elevation: 114 m (374 ft)
- Lowest elevation: 32 m (105 ft)
- Population (2019): 650
  - Density: 38/km^{2} (98/sq mi)
- Time zone: UTC+01:00 (CET)
  - Summer (DST): UTC+02:00 (CEST)
- Postal code: 37130
- ^{1} French Land Register data, which excludes lakes, ponds, glaciers > 1 km^{2} (0.386 sq mi or 247 acres) and river estuaries.

Saint-Patrice (French pronunciation: [sɛ̃ patʁis]) is a former commune in the Indre-et-Loire department in central France. On 1 January 2017, it was merged into the new commune Coteaux-sur-Loire.

== Population ==
Historical population

Year	Pop.	±% p.a.
1793	924	—
1821	1,046	+0.44%
1846	1,241	+0.69%
1872	1,233	−0.02%
1901	1,062	−0.51%
1926	793	−1.16%
1946	742	−0.33%

Year	Pop.	±% p.a.
1962	635	−0.97%
1968	593	−1.13%
1975	589	−0.10%
1982	560	−0.72%
1990	593	+0.72%
1999	639	+0.83%
2019	650	+0.09%

Source: EHESS and INSEE

== See also ==
- Communes of the Indre-et-Loire department
