= Restigné =

- Commune
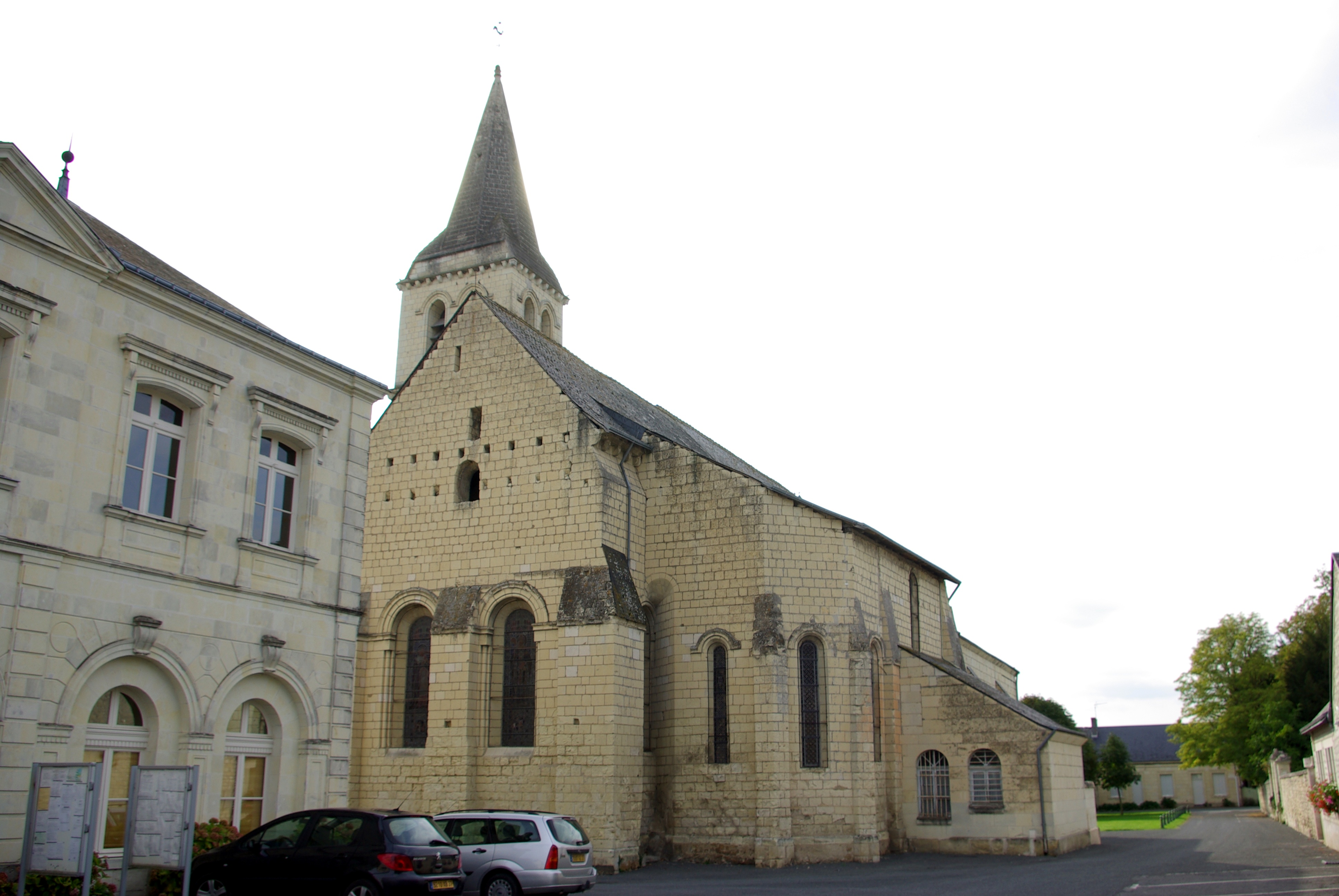
- The church of Saint-Martin, in Restigné
- Location of Restigné
- Location within France Location within Centre-Val de Loire
- Coordinates: 47°16′56″N 0°13′45″E
- Country: France
- Region: Centre-Val de Loire
- Department: Indre-et-Loire
- Arrondissement: Chinon
- Canton: Langeais

Government
  - Mayor (2020–2026): Christine Hascoët
- Area^{1}: 21.31 km^{2} (8.23 sq mi)
- Highest elevation: 114 m (374 ft)
- Lowest elevation: 30 m (98 ft)
- Population (2023): 1,139
  - Density: 53.45/km^{2} (138.4/sq mi)
- Time zone: UTC+01:00 (CET)
  - Summer (DST): UTC+02:00 (CEST)
- INSEE/Postal code: 37193 /37140
- ^{1} French Land Register data, which excludes lakes, ponds, glaciers > 1 km^{2} (0.386 sq mi or 247 acres) and river estuaries.

Restigné (French pronunciation: [ʁɛstiɲe]) is a commune in the Indre-et-Loire department in central France.

== Population ==
Historical population
Year	Pop.	±% p.a.
1968	1,302	—
1975	1,198	−1.18%
1982	1,210	+0.14%
1990	1,187	−0.24%
1999	1,225	+0.35%
2007	1,173	−0.54%
2012	1,192	+0.32%
2017	1,226	+0.56%
2023	1,139	−1.22%
Source: INSEE

== See also ==
- Communes of the Indre-et-Loire department
