= Benais =

- Commune
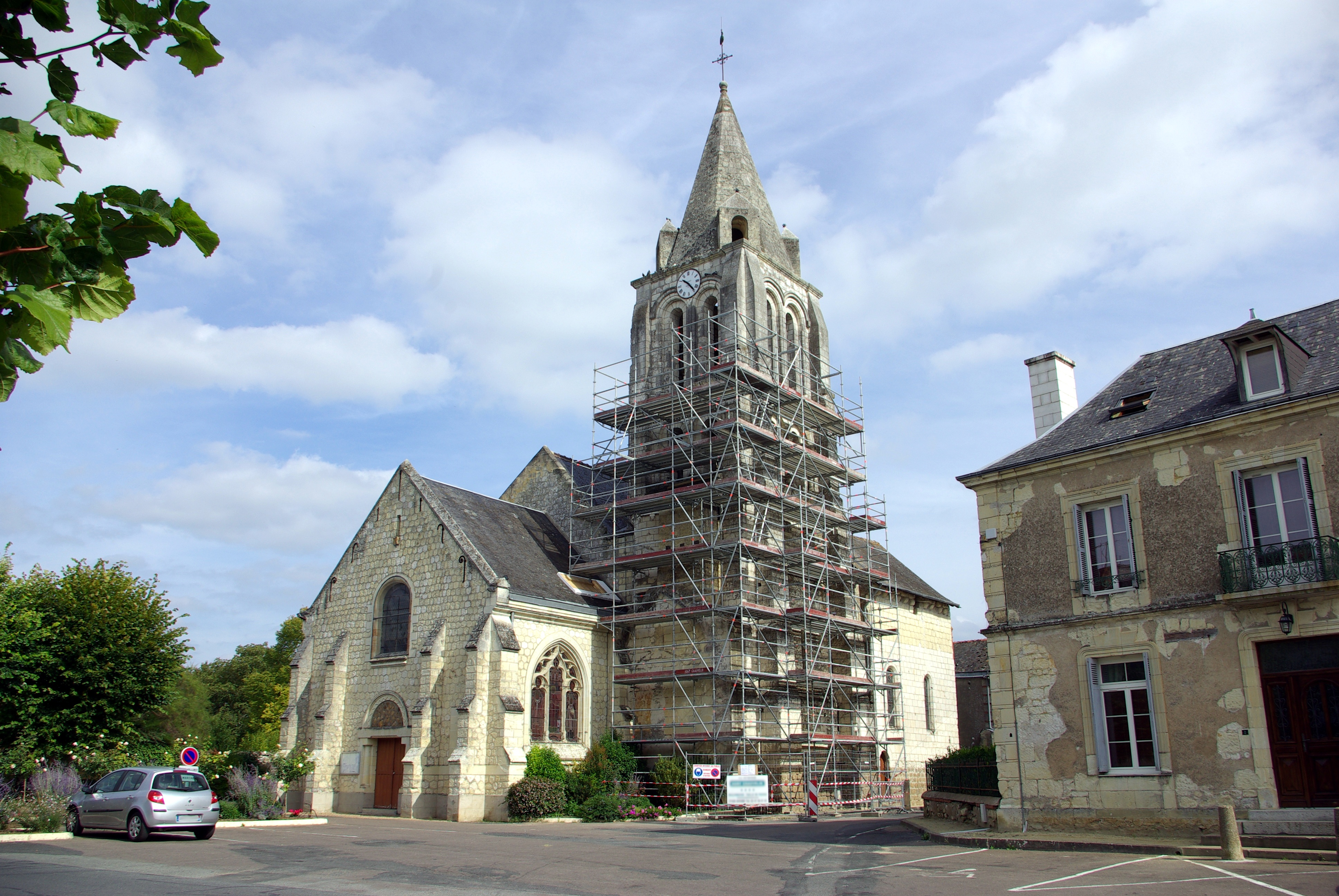
- The church of Saint-Germain, in Benais
- Location of Benais
- Location within France Location within Centre-Val de Loire
- Coordinates: 47°17′50″N 0°12′56″E
- Country: France
- Region: Centre-Val de Loire
- Department: Indre-et-Loire
- Arrondissement: Chinon
- Canton: Langeais

Government
  - Mayor (2020–2026): Stéphanie Riocreux
- Area^{1}: 20.08 km^{2} (7.75 sq mi)
- Highest elevation: 114 m (374 ft)
- Lowest elevation: 33 m (108 ft)
- Population (2023): 945
  - Density: 47.1/km^{2} (122/sq mi)
- Time zone: UTC+01:00 (CET)
  - Summer (DST): UTC+02:00 (CEST)
- INSEE/Postal code: 37024 /37140
- ^{1} French Land Register data, which excludes lakes, ponds, glaciers > 1 km^{2} (0.386 sq mi or 247 acres) and river estuaries.

Benais (French pronunciation: [bənɛ]) is a commune in the Indre-et-Loire department in central France.

== Population ==
Historical population
Year	Pop.	±% p.a.
1968	836	—
1975	681	−2.89%
1982	712	+0.64%
1990	862	+2.42%
1999	870	+0.10%
2007	873	+0.04%
2012	963	+1.98%
2017	922	−0.87%
2023	945	+0.41%
Source: INSEE

== See also ==
- Communes of the Indre-et-Loire department
