= Bourgueil =

- Commune
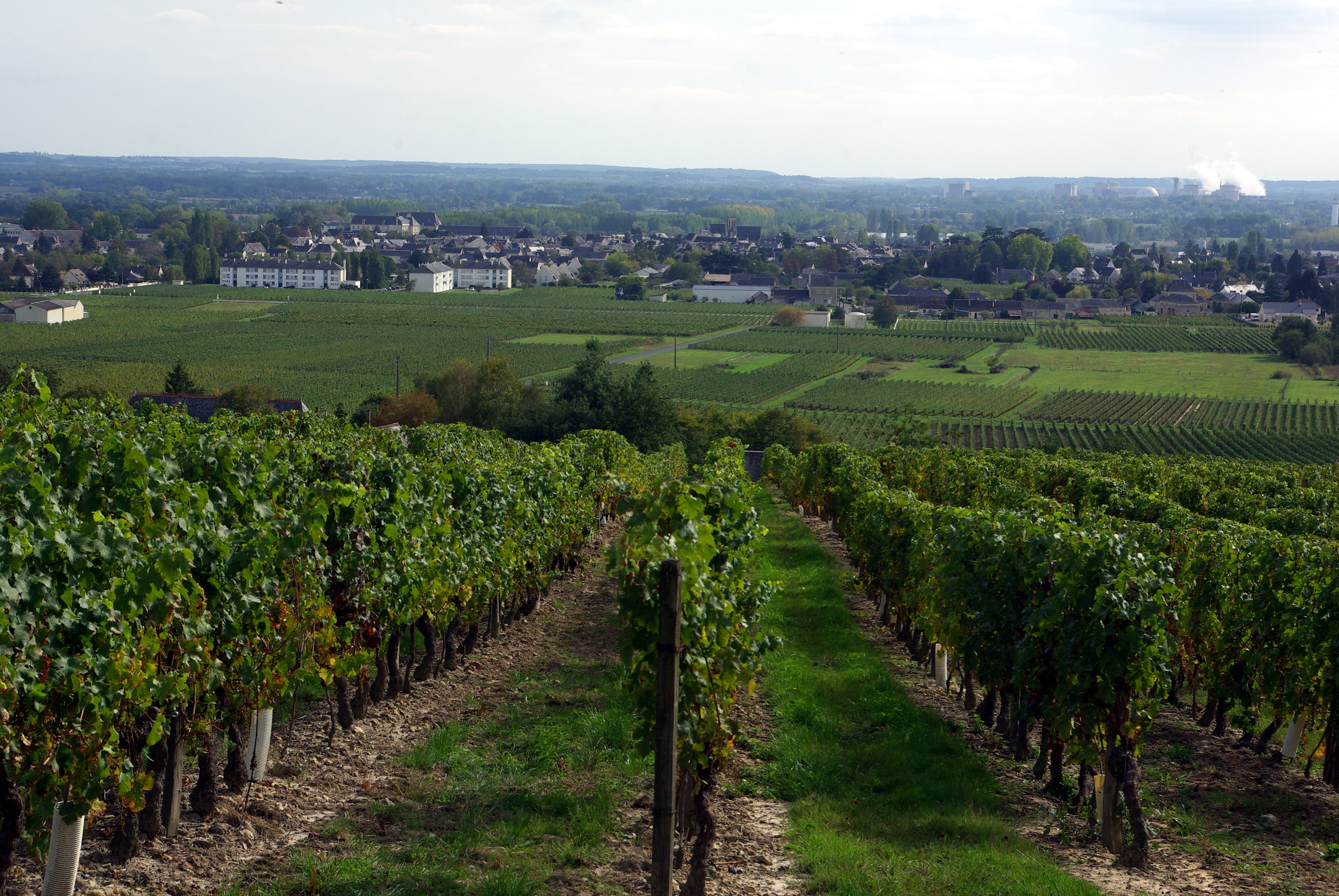
- A general view of Bourgueil

- Coat of arms
- Location of Bourgueil
- Location within France Location within Centre-Val de Loire
- Coordinates: 47°16′59″N 0°10′09″E
- Country: France
- Region: Centre-Val de Loire
- Department: Indre-et-Loire
- Arrondissement: Chinon
- Canton: Langeais

Government
  - Mayor (2020–2026): Benoît Baranger
- Area^{1}: 32.95 km^{2} (12.72 sq mi)
- Elevation: 42 m (138 ft)
- Highest elevation: 117 m (384 ft)
- Lowest elevation: 28 m (92 ft)
- Population (2023): 3,631
  - Density: 110.2/km^{2} (285.4/sq mi)
- Time zone: UTC+01:00 (CET)
  - Summer (DST): UTC+02:00 (CEST)
- INSEE/Postal code: 37031 /37140
- ^{1} French Land Register data, which excludes lakes, ponds, glaciers > 1 km^{2} (0.386 sq mi or 247 acres) and river estuaries.

Bourgueil (French pronunciation: [buʁɡœj]) is a commune in the Indre-et-Loire department in central France.

== Population ==
Historical population

Year	Pop.	±% p.a.
1793	3,280	—
1800	3,179	−0.45%
1806	3,200	+0.11%
1821	3,320	+0.25%
1831	3,556	+0.69%
1836	3,600	+0.25%
1841	3,493	−0.60%
1846	3,485	−0.05%
1851	3,405	−0.46%
1856	3,400	−0.03%
1861	3,416	+0.09%
1866	3,381	−0.21%
1872	3,304	−0.38%
1876	3,310	+0.05%
1881	3,207	−0.63%
1886	3,274	+0.41%
1891	3,143	−0.81%
1896	3,102	−0.26%
1901	3,063	−0.25%

Year	Pop.	±% p.a.
1906	2,989	−0.49%
1911	2,850	−0.95%
1921	2,512	−1.25%
1926	2,563	+0.40%
1931	2,488	−0.59%
1936	2,456	−0.26%
1946	2,551	+0.38%
1954	2,602	+0.25%
1962	3,093	+2.18%
1968	3,631	+2.71%
1975	3,620	−0.04%
1982	4,136	+1.92%
1990	4,001	−0.41%
1999	4,109	+0.30%
2007	3,909	−0.62%
2012	3,884	−0.13%
2017	3,923	+0.20%
2023	3,631	−1.28%

Source: EHESS and INSEE (1968–2023)

== Bourgueil wine ==
Bourgueil is an appellation d'origine contrôlée (AOC) for wine in the Loire Valley region, and produces primarily red wine from the grape variety Cabernet Franc. Bourgueil wine was mentioned in the works of François Rabelais.

== Transportation ==
Bourgueil is served by the A85 autoroute, a nearby railway line and the cycling-route, Loire a vélo.

== Personalities ==
Bourgueil was the birthplace of:

- Moses Amyraut (1596–1664), Protestant theologian and metaphysician
- Antoine Brutus Menier (1795–1853), chocolatier
- Jean Carmet (1920–1994), actor

In Acadian Genealogy, Bourgueil is notable as the birthplace of Guillaume Trahan.

== See also ==
- Loire Valley (wine)
- Communes of the Indre-et-Loire department
