= Canton of Langeais =

Coordinates: 47.33°N 0.41°E

The canton of Langeais is an administrative division of the Indre-et-Loire department, central France. Its borders were modified at the French canton reorganisation which came into effect in March 2015. Its seat is in Langeais.

It consists of the following communes:

1. Ambillou
2. Avrillé-les-Ponceaux
3. Benais
4. Bourgueil
5. Braye-sur-Maulne
6. Brèches
7. Channay-sur-Lathan
8. La Chapelle-sur-Loire
9. Château-la-Vallière
10. Chouzé-sur-Loire
11. Cinq-Mars-la-Pile
12. Cléré-les-Pins
13. Continvoir
14. Coteaux-sur-Loire
15. Couesmes
16. Courcelles-de-Touraine
17. Gizeux
18. Hommes
19. Langeais
20. Lublé
21. Marcilly-sur-Maulne
22. Mazières-de-Touraine
23. Restigné
24. Rillé
25. Saint-Laurent-de-Lin
26. Saint-Nicolas-de-Bourgueil
27. Savigné-sur-Lathan
28. Souvigné
29. Villiers-au-Bouin
