= Savennières wine =

French wine

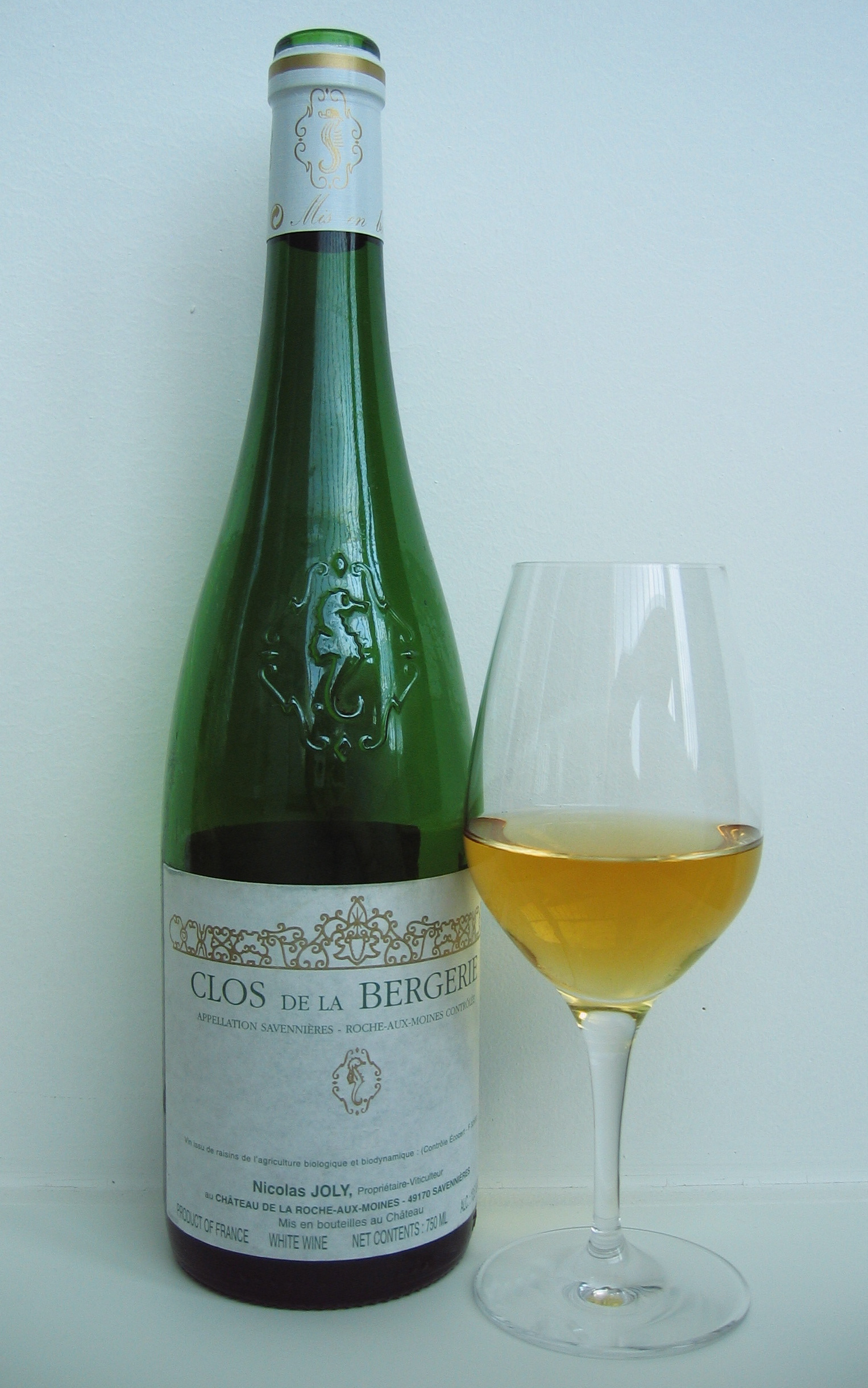
Clos de la Bergerie, a wine from Savennières-Roche-aux-Moines

Savennières wine (French pronunciation: [savənjɛʁ]) is a white wine, usually dry, produced from Chenin blanc around Savennières in the Loire Valley. The vineyards are situated on the north bank of the river Loire, in the Anjou-Saumur subregion.

There are three Appellation d'origine contrôlées (AOCs) for Savennières wine: Savennières, covering most of the vineyards, and the enclaves Savennières-Roche-aux-Moines and Savennières-Coulée-de-Serrant.

The area allowed for Savennières AOC spreads over 3 hills of schist, located on the northwest (right) bank of the Loire river, totaling about 300 hectares (740 acres), situated in three communes: Savennières, Bouchemaine and La Possonnière. Of these, about 146 hectares (360 acres) are actually planted with vineyards. Savennières-Roche-aux-Moines covers 33 hectares (82 acres) and Savennières-Coulée-de-Serrant covers 7 hectares (17 acres).

Savennières was originally defined as an AOC in 1952, and was revised in 1996 to introduce designations for sweet wines.

== Coulée de Serrant ==
The top enclave of Savennières, Coulée de Serrant, consists of a single estate run by Nicolas Joly. The wine produced by Joly from this appellation is labelled Clos de la Coulée de Serrant, and is mentioned by many critics as one of the world's top dry white wines.

Coulée de Serrant was first planted in 1130 by Cistercian monks.

== Wine style ==
Savennières is typically more full-bodied than dry Vouvray, and a significant step up in concentration and quality from basic Anjou blanc. As a wine produced from Chenin blanc in a relatively cold climate, Savennières is relatively high in acidity and tends to be a quite long-lived wine. The traditional, long-lived style of Savennières wine can be somewhat austere and unapproachable in youth. In recent years, some producers have aimed at producing wines that are more approachable when young, but that probably will be less long-lived.

Nicolas Joly, the most well-known producer of Savennières, only produces biodynamic wines. In some vintages, Joly's wines (especially Coulée de Serrant) may include grapes affected by noble rot, which is unusual for dry wines.

Historically, Savennières was a producer of sweet wines, but today almost only dry wines are produced. In those rare instances when semi-sweet or sweet Savennières is produced, the wine is often less sweet than most wines produced across the river in Coteaux du Layon and its subappellations. From 1996, the following regulations apply to Savennières wine with respect to residual sugar:

- Regular Savennières may not have more than 8 grams sugar per liter.
- Wines marked demi-sec have 8 to 18 grams sugar per liter, and would typically be perceived as off-dry.
- Wines marked moelleux have 18 to 45 grams sugar per liter, which normally corresponds to semi-sweet.
- Wines marked doux have more than 45 grams sugar per liter.

== See also ==
- Clos de la Coulée de Serrant - Nicolas Joly
- Closel winery - Evelyne de Pontbriand
- Boudignon winery - Thibaud Boudignon
- Maison Jaune winery - Jean-Claude Taddeï
- Baumard winery
