= Anjou wine =

French wine

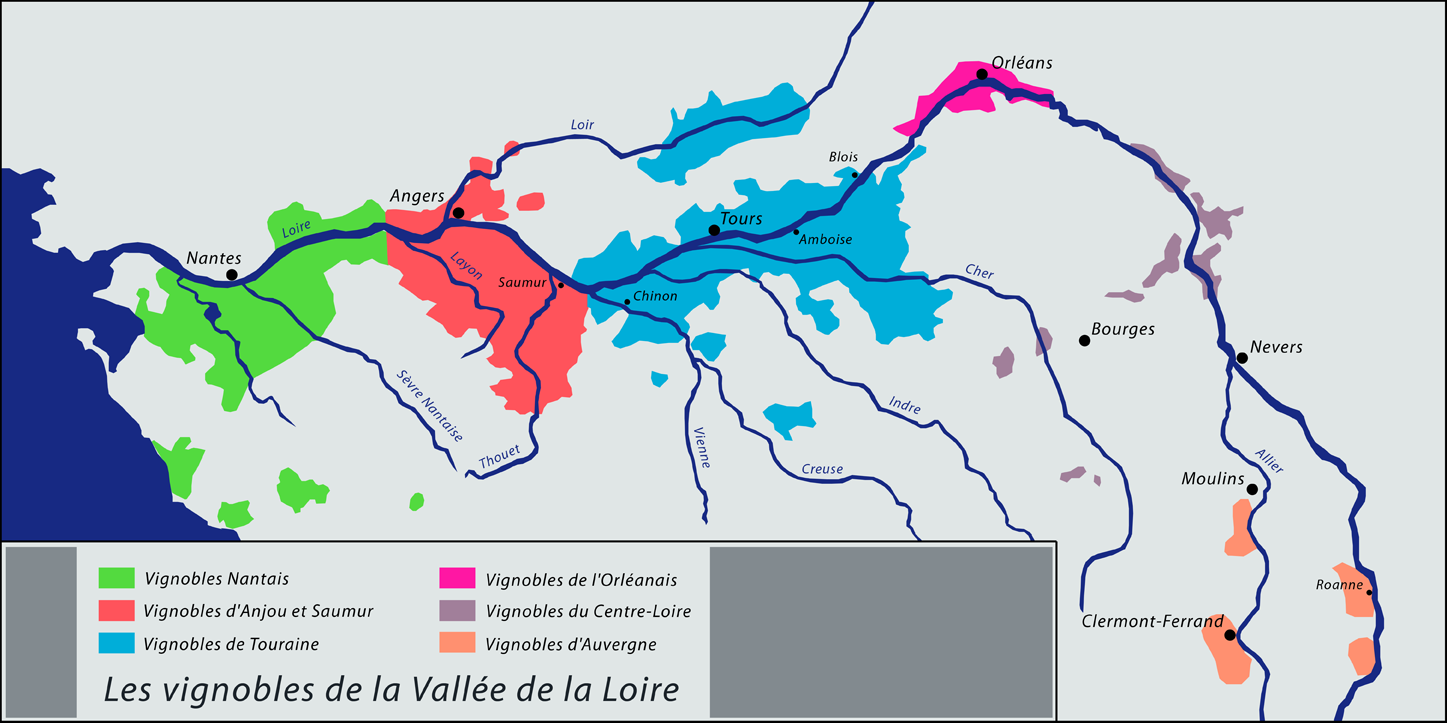
Map of Anjou wine region.

Anjou wine is produced in the Loire Valley wine region of France near the city of Angers. The wines of region are often grouped together with the wines of nearby Saumur as "Anjou-Saumur". Along with the wines produced further east in Touraine, Anjou-Saumur make what is collectively known as the "Middle Loire" (as opposed to the "Upper Loire" which includes the wine regions of Sancerre and Pouilly-Fumé). Within the Anjou wine region are several Appellation d'origine contrôlées (AOCs) responsible for a broad spectrum of wines including still red, white and rosé produced with varying levels of sweetness. Extending across the Deux-Sèvres, Maine-et-Loire and Vienne départements, the generic Anjou AOC appellation and its various sub-appellations encompasses vineyards across more than 151 communes.

Wine expert Tom Stevenson describes the wines of the area as being a "microcosm of the Loire Valley", featuring wines made from every grape variety and in almost every style produced in the entire Loire wine region. Among the wines of Anjou, Savennières is noted for its dry Chenin blanc wines and the Coteaux du Layon for its sweet dessert wines that includes the botrytized wines of Bonnezeaux and Quarts de Chaume. Various rosé wines are produced in the region under different AOC designation include Rosé d'Anjou, the most basic level made predominantly from Grolleau, and Cabernet d'Anjou which is usually made from Cabernet Franc or Cabernet Sauvignon. For most of its history, dry red wines have represented a small percentage of Anjou winemaking but in recent years the numbers have been steadily increasing—aided, in part, by the 1987 establishment of the Anjou-Villages AOC designation for red wines which can be made from only Cabernet Sauvignon and Cabernet Franc. The Gamay grape of the Beaujolais wine region has had a long history in the Anjou with its own Anjou-Gamay AOC. Grapes from around the region can go into basic Anjou blanc and Anjou Rouge AOC wines.

== History ==
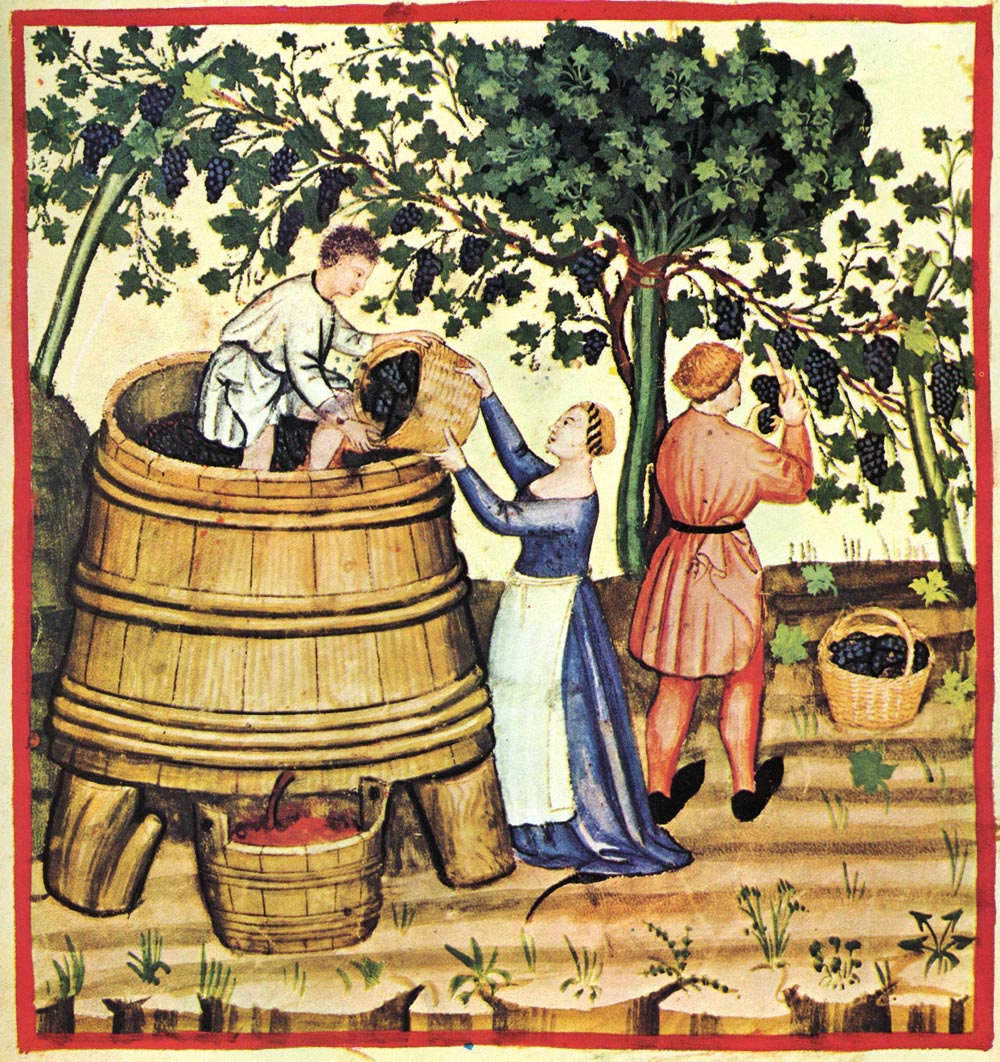
Angevin winemakers in the Middle Ages were one of the few Medieval producers to blend both the vin de goutte (free run juice) with the vin de presse (pressed wine) which added tannins and color to the wine.

Wine made from the Chenin blanc grape can be dated to the 9th century in vineyards belonging to the Glanfeuil Abbey located just south of Angers in what is now Le Thoureil. Angevin wines have been held in high esteem since the Middle Ages but were mostly limited to local French markets. Unusual for the time Anjou was known for its unique winemaking technique of blending vin de presse, the wine extracted from pressing the grapes, with the vin de goutte or free run juice that came from the weight of gravity pressing the grape. This vin de presse added extra tannins and color to the wine but could limit the wine's appeal for being consumed young.

Dutch traders in the 16th and 17th century introduced sweet wine production to the region that would feed the growing and prosperous market for such wines in Rotterdam. Anjou wines experienced some brief popularity with the English market being in demand due to their reputation for tasting "ripe and sweet". The high point of the Angevin wine industry was the early 19th century when the market demands of Paris overtook those of the Dutch and plantings flourished throughout the area. But soon the phylloxera epidemic would ravage the region's vineyards and bring this golden era to a close. In response to the devastation, growers in Anjou replanted with a wide range of grape varieties of varying qualities, including hybrid grapes. Even with this massive replanting, vineyards in the Anjou still number less than half of the acreage planted during the peak years of production.

== Climate and geography ==
Located along the river Loire near the town of Angers, the region of Anjou has a mild continental climate with some maritime influences due to its close proximity to the Atlantic Ocean. This influence is tempered by the forests of the Vendée department to the southwest which absorbs the brunt of the rainfall and winds coming in off the Atlantic. Annual rainfall totals for the region usually hover around 19 inches (500mm). The vineyard soils close to the Loire are composed primarily of carboniferous rock and schist. Chenin blanc, in particular, seems to do well in this soil type.

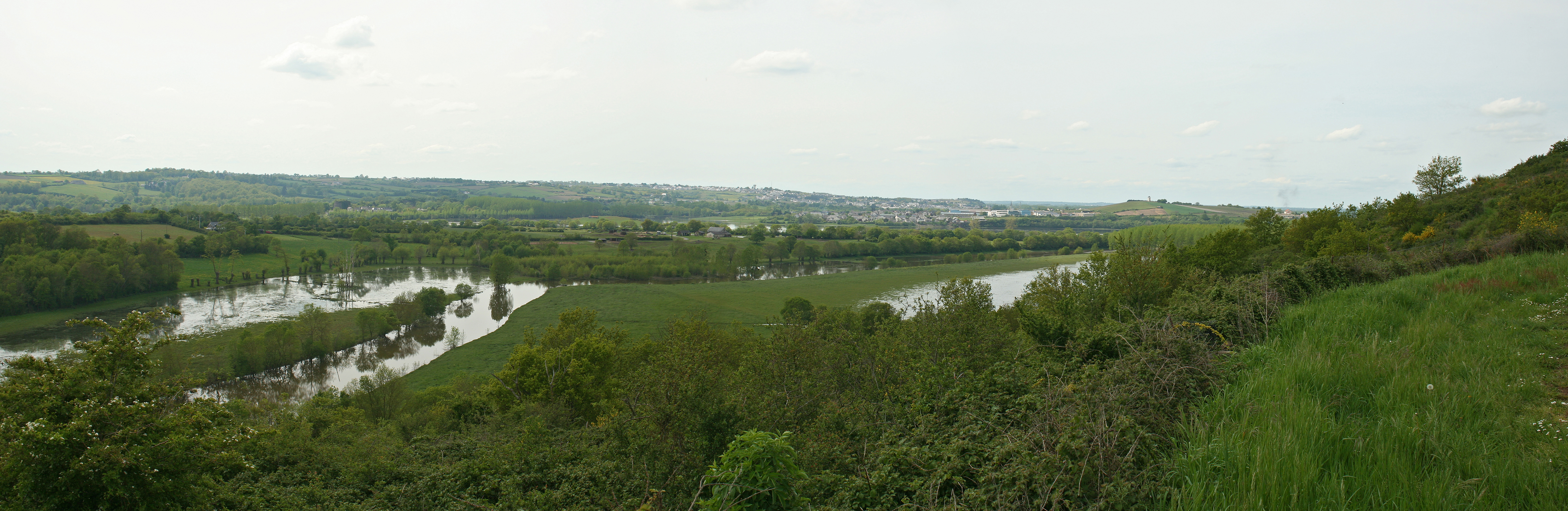
The tributaries of the Loire, such as the river Layon (pictured), play an important role in viticulture of the Anjou wine region.

Most of the wine regions in Anjou are located south of the river Loire, with the one notable exception of Savennières which is located on the right bank of the river just south of Angers. The tributaries of the Loire, particularly the Layon and Aubance, play significant roles in the area's wine production with vineyard planted on their right banks and sheltered from wind by nearby hill sides. The Aubance and Layon flow parallel to each other going northwest towards the Loire and when the climate is favorable can help promote the development of noble rot that is at the heart of the region's sweet wine production.

== Appellations ==
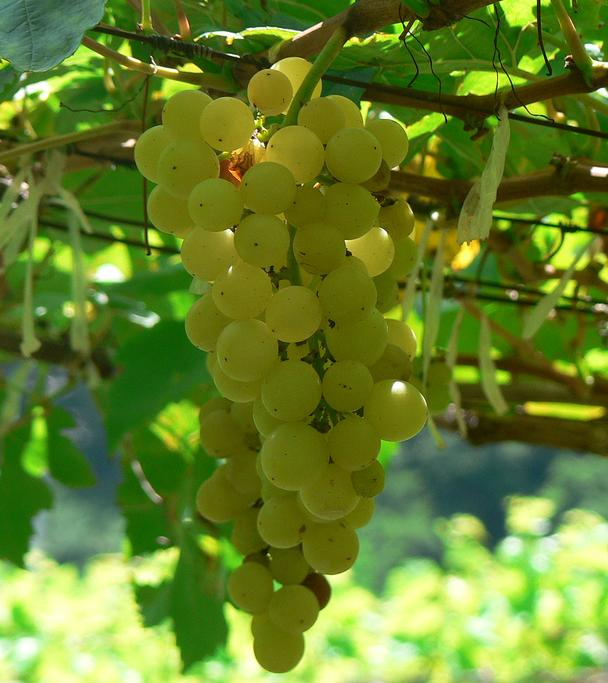
Chenin blanc is the primary grape of the dry and sweet wines of the Anjou wine region.

Within the Anjou wine region are several Appellation d'origine contrôlée (AOC)s responsible for a broad spectrum of wines including still red, white and rosé produced with varying levels of sweetness. The region produce more variety of different wine styles, from different grape varieties than any other Loire Valley wine region. The majority of wine production in the region revolves around sweet white wines produced under their own sub-appellation including the Coteaux du Layon, Bonnezeaux, Quarts de Chaume and Coteaux de l'Aubance AOCs. Around 15% of yearly Angevin wine production goes to dry white wines made predominantly from Chenin blanc with the Savennières AOC being the most noted example and Anjou Blanc AOC being the most commonly found on the worldwide wine market. Among the rosés produced in the region are predominantly Grolleau Rosé d'Anjou AOC and the Cabernet Franc and/or Cabernet Sauvignon based Cabernet d'Anjou with the later being more widely recognized for quality than the former. Grapes from the region also go into third style of rosé known as Rosés de Loire, which can include grapes from across the Middle Loire Valley though the bulk of the production is centered around Anjou. This style of rosé is completely dry and can be made from Pinot noir, Gamay, Grolleau, Cabernet Franc, Cabernet Sauvignon and Pineau d'Aunis.

The production of dry red wines has been steadily increasing since the late 20th century spurred on, in part, by the creation of the Anjou-Villages AOC in 1987 for premium red wine production. Made predominantly from Cabernet Franc, some of the most ideally situated vineyards located south of Angers in the Coteaux de l'Aunbance AOC was given their own distinct sub-appellation in 1998 known as the Anjou-Villages Brissac AOC. The Gamay grape of Beaujolais still has a presence here and its own appellation of Anjou Gamay AOC. Gamay, as well as a variety of other red wine grape varieties, can also be produced under the catch-all appellation Anjou Rouge AOC.

=== Major appellations ===
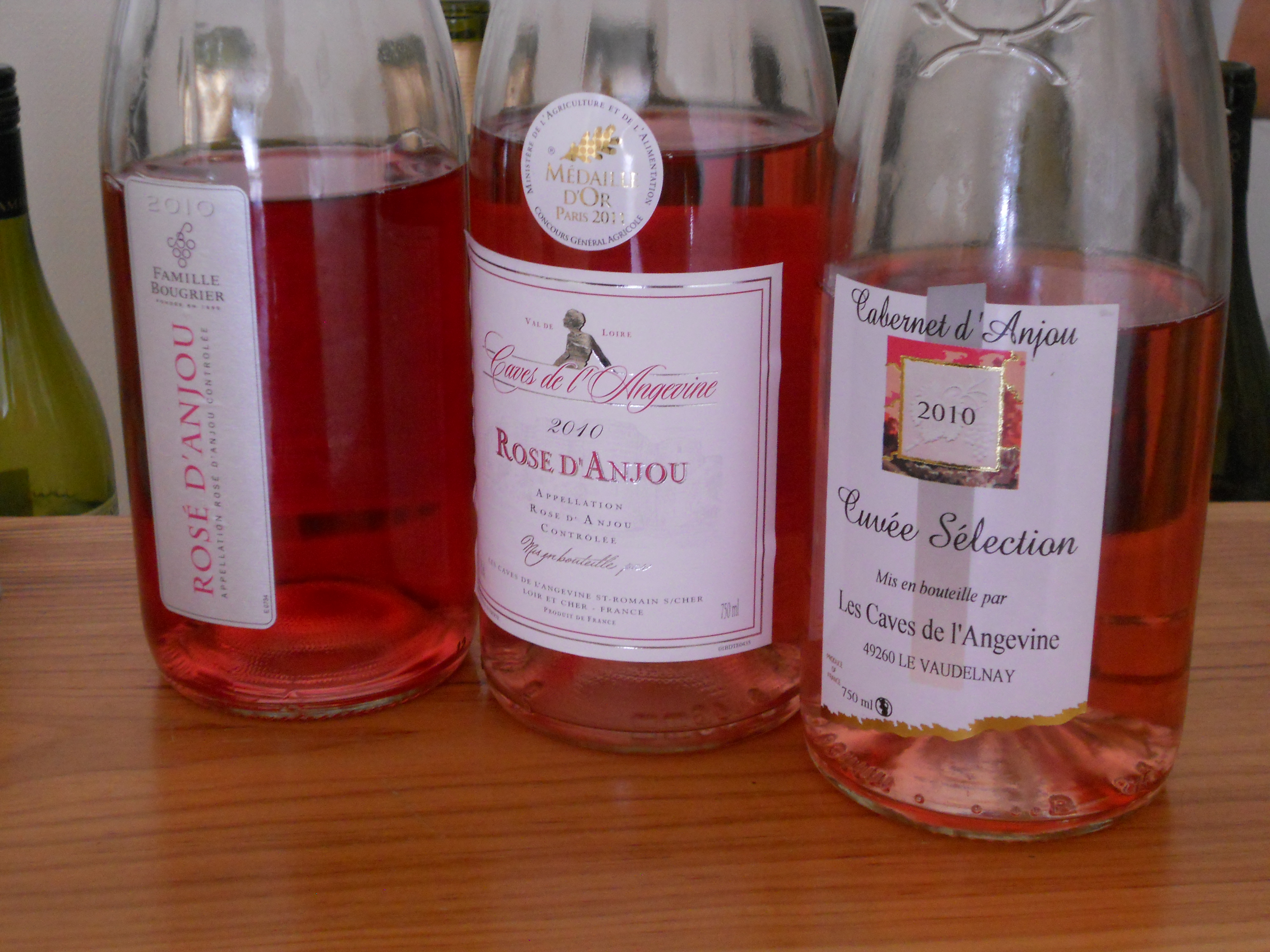
Rosé d'Anjou and Cabernet d'Anjou

- Anjou AOC - The boundaries of this AOC extend into nearby Saumur, allowing some of the wine produced in that region to be sold under the Anjou AOC label. The basic Anjou Rouge can be produced from Cabernet Franc, Cabernet Sauvignon and Pineau d'Aunis and tend to be medium to full bodied. Basic Anjou Blanc can range in style from dry to sweet and light bodied to full. They must be composed of a minimum 80% Chenin blanc with Chardonnay and Sauvignon blanc permitted to fill out the remaining 20% of the blend. According to wine expert Tom Stevenson, both the reds and whites wines have the aging potential of only a few years after vintage.
- Anjou-Villages AOC The boundaries of this red wine only AOC was first delimited in 1986 but did not go into effect until the 1991 harvest. Made entirely from Cabernet Franc and/or Cabernet Sauvignon, these wines have an aging potential of 2–6 years after harvest. There are 46 communes in the appellation allowed to produce grapes for this AOC.
- Anjou-Villages Brissac AOC A sub appellation of the Anjou-Villages AOC, the boundaries of this AOC encompassed the vineyards around Brissac-Quincé and nine surrounding villages. Officially recognized in 1998, producers in the region were given an allowance to back date their labels with the new appellation for the previous 1997 & 1996 vintage.
- Cabernet d'Anjou AOC The first rosé wine to be made entirely from Cabernet grapes was in 1905 but for most of the 20th century, this style of rosé took a backseat to the popularity of Rosé d'Anjou made predominantly from Grolleau. Made entirely from Cabernet Franc and/or Cabernet Sauvignon, these rosés tend to be drier than Rosé d'Anjou with higher alcohol and potentially more character.
- Rosé d'Anjou AOC Also known as Anjou Rosé AOC, these medium-sweet rosés saw a period of immense popularity in the mid to late 20th century where in the late 1980s they composed nearly 55% of all wine produced in the Anjou district. Since that high point, production has been steadily declining. Made predominantly from Grolleau with small percentages of Cabernet Franc, Cabernet Sauvignon, Gamay, Malbec and Pineau d'Aunis permitted, these wines can be sold nouveau with wine experts recommending that they be consumed early soon after release.

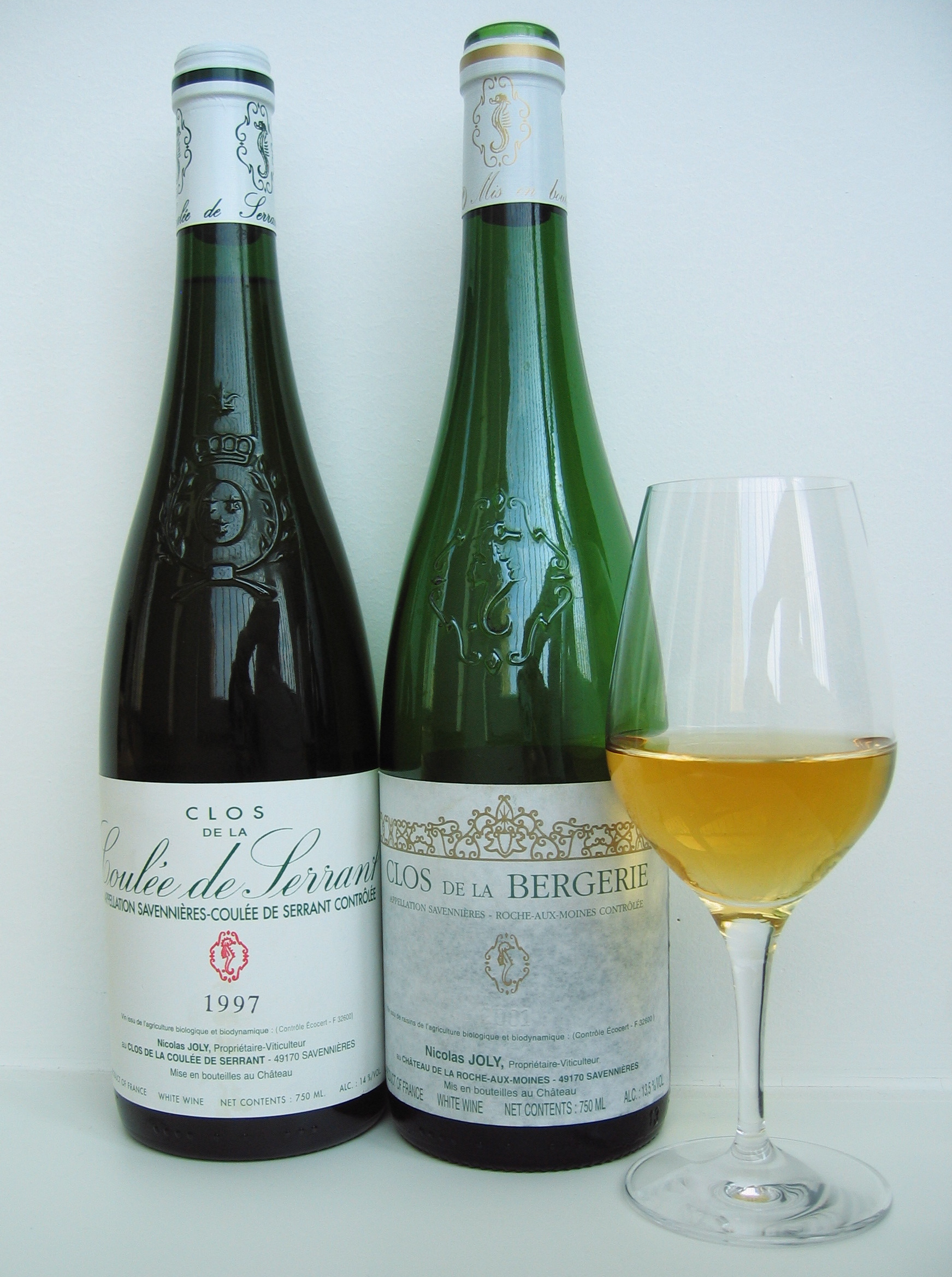
Savennières wine from producer Nicolas Joly. The bottle on the left is from the sub-appellation AOC of Savennières Coulée-de-Serrant.

- Savennières AOC In the early 20th century, Savennières was known mostly for sweet wine production. As the focus turned towards dry Chenin blanc based wines, the region started to garner attention for mineral intensity and aging potential of the wines. Located along four southeast facing slopes on the right bank of the river Loire, vineyards in Savennières are composed primarily of schist and volcanic soils. Yields are highly restricted to just 20 hectoliters per hectare which tends to produce more concentrated fruit. In recent years, the wines of Savennières have received much praise and recognition for their quality by various wine experts such as Jacqueline Friedrich who describes the intense flavors and layers of minerality as "the most cerebral wine in the world" and Karen MacNeil who describes the wines as "..possibly the great dry Chenin blanc in the world."
- Savennières Coulée-de-Serrant AOC A 17 acres (7 hectare) sub appellation of Savennières, this AOC encompasses one single vineyard that is a monopole owned by Nicolas Joly.
- Savennières Roche-Aux-Moines AOC A 42-acre (17 hectare) sub appellation of Savennières, this AOC encompasses a single vineyard that is partially owned by 3 wine estates-Château de la Roche-aux-Moines (owned by Nicolas Joly), Château de Chamboureau and Domaine-aux-Moines.

=== Sweet wine appellations ===
- Anjou Coteaux de la Loire AOC Located southwest of the city of Angers, this white wine only appellations was designated in 1946 to produce sweet wines from Chenin blanc. The grapes in this AOC are harvested at same sugar levels as in Sauternes (221 grams per liter) with the finished wines having residual sugar levels of 17 grams per liter. In the early 21st century, as the market for dessert wines dwindle, vineyards in this area are rapidly being converted to Cabernet Franc and Cabernet Sauvignon for production of red wines under the Anjou AOC appellation.
- Bonnezeaux AOC A sub-appellation of the Coteaux du Layon AOC comprises three southwest facing slopes within the village of Thouarcé that produce sweet, often botrytized, wines made entirely from Chenin blanc. Harvest in Bonnezeaux is very labor-intensive requiring harvested to go through the vineyards in multiple passes or tries selecting only the ripest individual grapes. In 2003 the Institut National des Appellations d'Origine (INAO) increased the harvest sugar levels from 204 grams per liter to 238 and the minimum residual sugar levels of the finished wine from 17 grams per liter to 34. Wine expert Tom Stevenson describes the wines of Bonnezeaux as being more full-bodied and richer than those of Quarts-de-Chaume with an aging potential of up to 20 years or more.

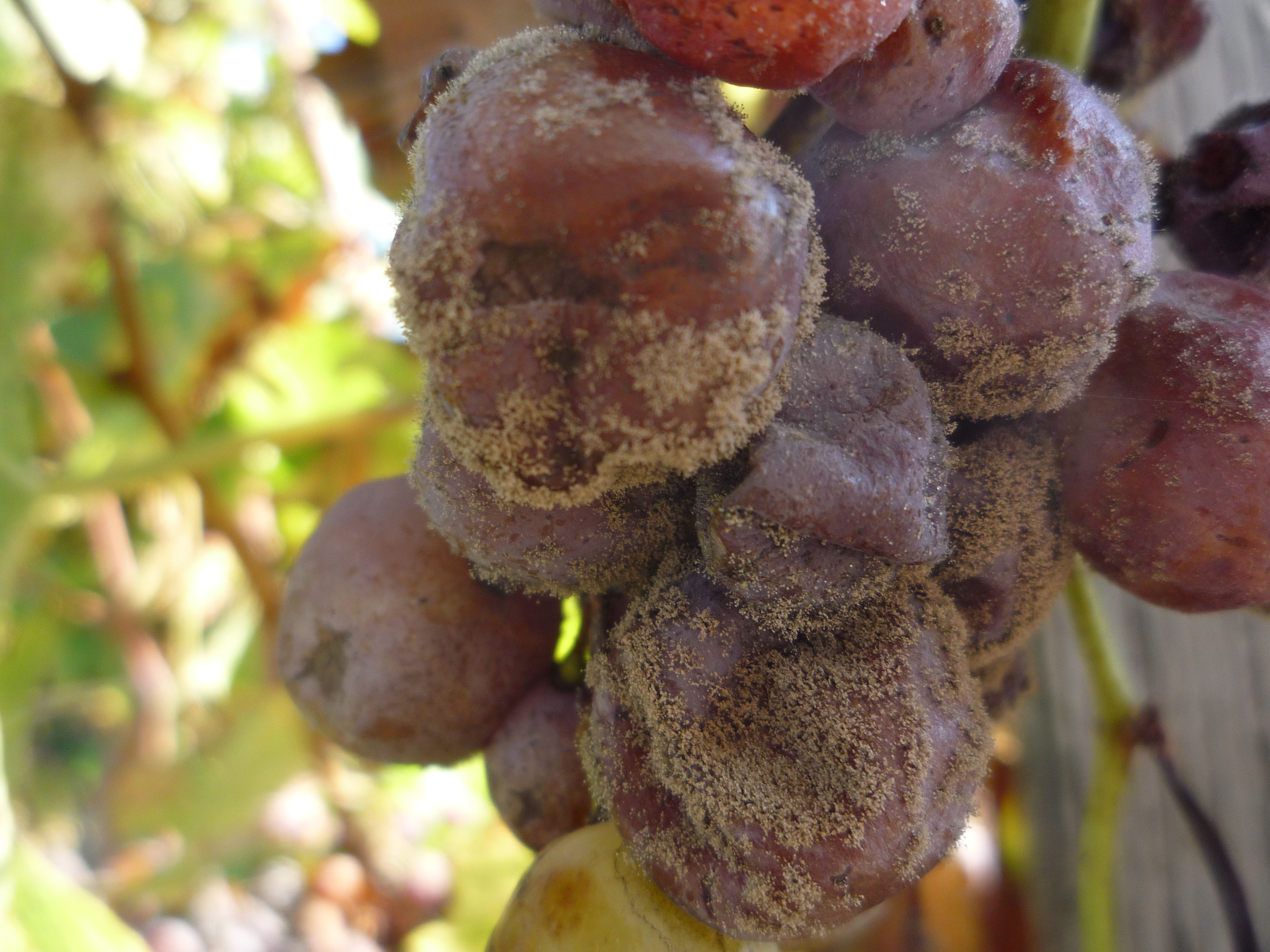
Many of the sweet wines of the Anjou are botrytized, meaning that the noble rot of Botrytis cinerea has infected the grapes causing the grapes to shrivel and concentrate the sugars inside.

- Coteaux de l'Aubance AOC Located along the river Aubance, this AOC covers sweet wines made entirely from Chenin blanc planted in the schist vineyard soils of the region. To qualify for the Coteaux de l'Aubance AOC designation producers must harvest the grapes in tries. In 2003 a special designation of Coteaux de l'Aubance Sélection de Grains Nobles was set aside for the grapes harvested at sugar levels of 230 grams liter (as opposed to 204 g/L) with residual sugar levels of the finished wine reaching a minimum of 34 grams per liter (as opposed to the previous standard of 17 g/L). Due to the high cost of labor and low production, many producers in this area are converting their vineyards to the red Cabernet varieties to produce the rosé wine Cabernet d'Anjou.
- Coteaux du Layon AOC This large appellation overlaps the Saumur AOC to the southeast and the Anjou Coteaux de la Loire AOC in the northwest. The region has a long history of winemaking sweet white wines dating back to the 4th century AD. Today the AOC is dedicated to 100% Chenin blanc wines that, in favorable years, are afflicted by noble rot. Yields are restricted to a maximum of 30 hectoliters per hectare and wines must have a minimum 12% alcohol level in order to qualify for AOC designation. In 2003 mandatory harvest sugar levels being increased from 204 grams per liter to 221 g/L or 294 g/L for the newly established Sélection de Grains Nobles (SGN) designation and minimum residual sugar levels in the finished wines increased from 17 g/L to 34 g/L.
- Coteaux du Layon Villages AOC A sub-appellation of the Coteaux du Layon AOC, this wine region covers six communes along the river Layon that have historically produced wines of high quality. The six communes are Beaulieu-sur-Layon, Faye-d'Anjou, Rablay-sur-Layon, Rochefort-sur-Loire, Saint-Aubin-de-Luigné and Saint-Lambert-du-Lattay. According to wine expert Tom Stevenson, there are noticeable differences among the wines produced by each commune (all made from Chenin blanc) with the wines of Beaulieu-sur-Layon being characterized by their light aromas; Faye-d'Anjou wines having a distinctive brushwood aroma; Rablay-sur-Layon wines tend to be the most bold and round; the wines of Rochefort-sur-Loire tend to be full bodied and have the most aging potential; Saint-Aubin-de-Luigné wines are characterized by their delicate aromas that develop over time and the wines of Saint-Lambert-du-Lattay often have very round mouthfeel and robust flavors.
- Quarts-de-Chaume AOC Most of the land in this appellation near the village of Chaume once belonged to the abbey of Ronceray d'Angers who required from tenant vignerons tithes in the form of 1/4 (a quarter or "Quarts") of their yearly production. From this history, the name Quarts-de-Chaume was attached to the Chenin blanc wines of this region harvested and produced in a manner similar to those in Bonnezeaux.

==== Chaume AOC controversy ====
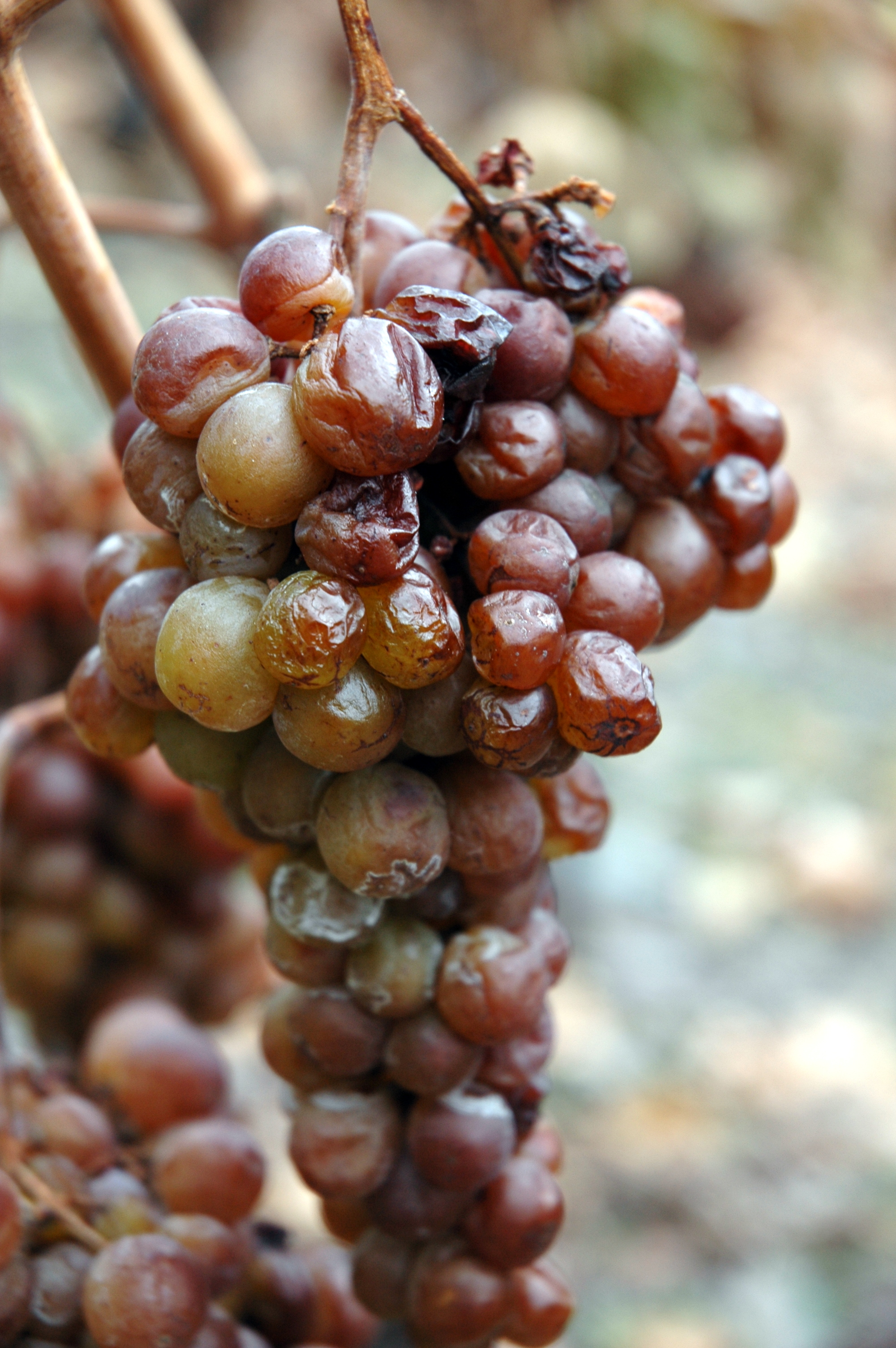
An example of passerillage where the grapes are raisined on the vine rather than infected by Botrytis cinera. Similar to botrytized wines, the raisining has the effect of reducing water in the grape and causing the sugars to be more concentrated.

Along the river Layon is the commune of Rochefort-sur-Loire which contains the village of Chaume with a long making tradition that finally received AOC designation in the early 21st century. In 2003 the INAO granted the request for the sweet wines from this region to be called Chaume 1er Cru des Coteaux du Layon AOC. Made entirely from Chenin blanc, these wines are most often the product of passerillage or "raisining" on the vine than of infection by noble rot. Yields were restricted to no more than 25 hectoliters per hectares as grapes were harvested with a minimum of 238 grams per liter with at least 34 grams of residual sugar in the finished wine. The producers in the Quarts-de-Chaume AOC, located on the plateau southwest of Chaume, took exception to the new AOC particularly the inclusion of the term 1er Cru (or Premier cru) which has a quality association with the wines of Burgundy. The producers of the Quarts-de-Chaume AOC felt that consumers would equate Chaume 1er Cru des Coteaux du Layon as being of a higher quality than their own wines and such their own AOC designation was being devalued. In response to these concerns, the INAO renamed the AOC in 2006 to the shorter Chaume AOC. Quarts-de-Chaume AOC producers still felt that the close associate between their AOC and Chaume was causing damage to the value of their wines and continued to object to the AOC naming. In response the INAO disbanded the Chaume AOC entirely in 2009. Now wine produced in this region must fall under the larger Coteaux du Layon AOC designation.

=== Other appellations ===
- Anjou Gamay AOC This appellation maintains nearly the same boundary as the Anjou AOC but is dedicated to wines produced 100% from the Gamay grape. Similar to Beaujolais nouveau, these wines can be produced as Vins de primeur and released as early as the third Thursday of November following harvest.
- Anjou Mousseux AOC Sparkling wine AOC produced according to the traditional method. Most vineyards in the appellation overlap with those of Saumur, making the appearance of the Anjou Mousseux AOC on wine labels rare as producers favor using the more recognizable and marketable Saumur AOC designation. Both white and rosé sparkling wines are produced in this region with sweetness levels ranging from brut to demi-sec. The white sparkling wines must be composed of a minimum 60% Chenin blanc with Cabernet Franc, Cabernet Sauvignon, Gamay, Grolleau, Malbec and Pineau d'Aunis permitted to fill out the remaining 40%. Rosé sparklers are made from a blend of Cabernet Franc, Cabernet Sauvignon, Gamay, Grolleau, Malbec and Pineau d'Aunis.
- Anjou Pétillant AOC Wines labeled under this designation are semi-sparkling (similar to the Italian wine frizzante) and sold in regular still wine bottles and corks rather than Champagne bottles. These wines are aged in the bottle for a minimum of 9 months before release and can range in sweetness levels from dry to medium sweet. The white wines produced under this style must be composed of a minimum 80% Chenin blanc with Chardonnay and Sauvignon blanc responsible for the remaining 20%. A semi-sparkling rosé style may be produced under the Rosé d'Anjou Pétillant AOC designation and be composed of predominantly Grolleau with Cabernet Franc, Cabernet Sauvignon, Gamay, Malbec and Pineau d'Aunis also permitted.

== Viticulture and winemaking ==
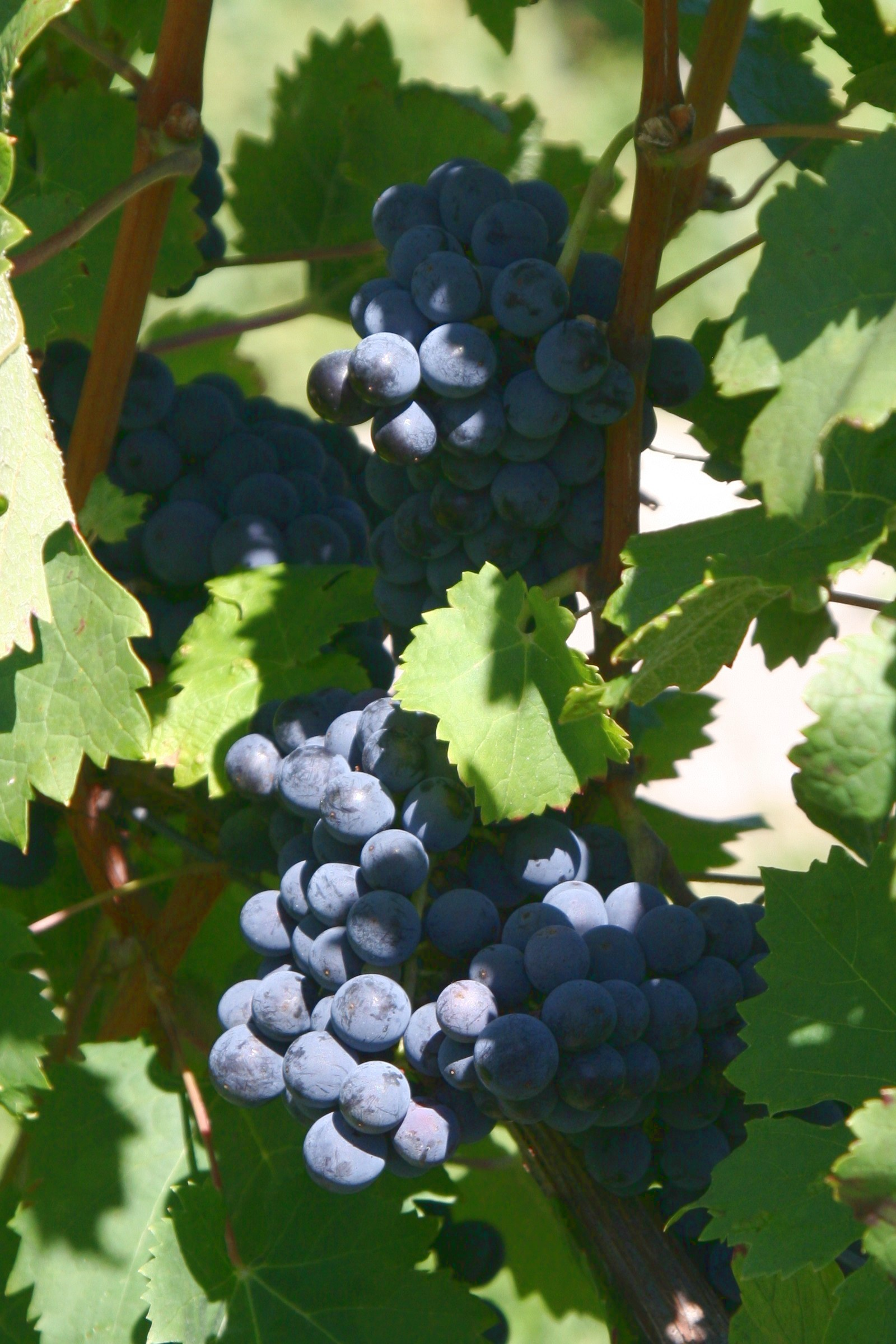
Cabernet Franc is an important red wine grape variety in the Anjou.

The two major grape varieties of the Anjou are Chenin blanc, known locally as Pineau de la Loire, which is used for dry, sweet, still and sparkling wine and Cabernet Franc which is used mostly for rosé and still red wines. The sweet wine production of Anjou is highly dependent on favorable climate conditions and experiences marked vintage variation from year to year. The character of the vintage and climate will ultimately determine what type of wine will be produced. Many of the vineyards in the Coteaux du Layon, Bonnezeaux, Quarts de Chaume and Coteaux de l'Aubance AOCs are located on sheltered slopes along tributaries of the Loire. In favorable vintages, the late summer and early fall months will bring climate conditions that encourage moisture and mist in the morning and enough sunshine in the afternoon to promote the development of favorable Botrytis cinerea rot instead of less desirable forms of grape rot. In exceptional years where there is enough warmth and dry weather during the harvest months, the grapes will be left on the vine to raisin in a process known as passerille. This method desiccates the wine, removing moisture and concentrating sugars, without adding the nuance of flavor that Botrytis does.

A characteristic of late harvest and botrytized wine production is the harvest of individual grapes in successive passes or tries through the vineyard ensuring only the ripest grapes are picked. Some producers will ferment and bottle the production of each tries separately but many eventually blend them together in order to produce a more balanced wine. The wine is often fermented at low temperatures and for some sweet wines can take up to 2 months. The alcohol level left in these wines can range from 12 to 14% depending on the sweetness level.

The broad spectrum of wine styles produced in Anjou brings with it a wide variety of winemaking techniques. In areas such as the Coteaux du Layon, the wines are fermented in 400 L (106 gallons) "double-barriques" and submitted to partial malolactic fermentation. The basic still wines of Anjou blanc are made similar to still white wine production elsewhere though, as wine expert Jancis Robinson notes, they do have an historical association with being over sulfited. As red wine production continues to find a market, and plantings of Cabernet Sauvignon increase, more producers are experimented with the use of new oak barrels. In riper years Angevin producers can make more fuller bodied reds similar to those found in the Touraine wine reds but still relatively light when compared to the reds of warmer climates such as Bordeaux and the Rhone.

== See also ==
- Clos de la Coulée de Serrant - Nicolas Joly
- Domaine du Closel - Château des Vaults - Evelyne de Pontbriand
- Boudignon winery - Thibaud Boudignon
- Maison Jaune winery - Jean-Claude Taddeï
- Baumard winery
- Château de Fesles winery
