= René Renou =

French wine industry leader

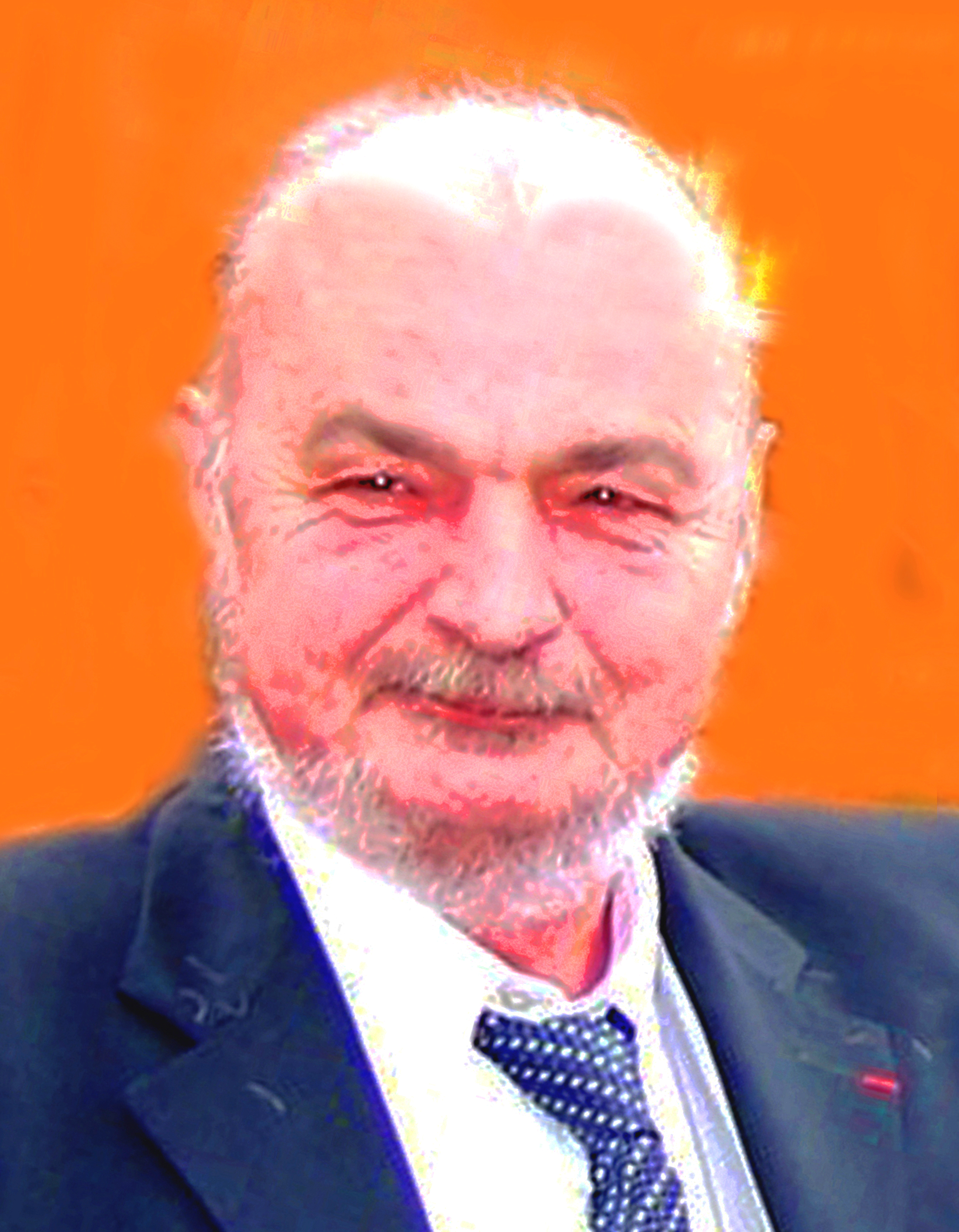
René Renou

René Bernard Renou (16 June 1952 – 19 June 2006) was president of the Institut National des Appellations d'Origine (INAO) at the time of his death and was "one of the most influential men in French winemaking".

Renou argued that France's Appellation d'origine contrôlée (AOC) system was hindering the country's competitiveness in the world wine market. He said that the AOC system was "conceived for producers rather than consumers", that there are too many AOCs, they are not meaningful, that they confuse consumers, and that reform was essential. His proposals for reform met strong resistance and defense of the status quo.

BettaneDesseauve named Renou Man of the Year in 2005. He was a Chevalier de la Légion d’Honneur and Commander in the Ordre du Mérite Agricole.

The René Renou winery is located in the Anjou district of the Loire Valley wine region, and makes wine from Coteaux du Layon and other AOCs.

== See also ==
- French wine
- List of wine personalities
