= Thibaud Boudignon =

Winery and vineyard in Savennières, Loire Valley, France

Thibaud Boudignon is a French winegrower and also the name of his organic winery and vineyard located in Savennières and La Possonnière, in the Anjou region of the Loire Valley, France. Founded in 2009, the domaine has rapidly become one of the most acclaimed estates in the Loire Valley, with its wines appearing on the tables of numerous Michelin-starred restaurants in France and distributed internationally.

== History ==
Thibaud Boudignon was born and raised in the Médoc region of Bordeaux, and originally pursued a career as a high-level judoka, with ambitions of competing at the Olympic level. His transition into winemaking began in 2002. His initial foray into viticulture took him first to Bordeaux, working at Château Lafite Rothschild and Château Canon La Gaffelière, and then to Burgundy, at Domaine Philippe Charlopin, where he absorbed the Burgundian philosophy of terroir valorisation and parcel-by-parcel vinification.

Drawn by a desire for freedom and experimentation, Boudignon chose the banks of the Loire, becoming cellar master at Domaine de la Soucherie in Anjou from 2008 to 2017. Starting in 2009, he simultaneously began creating his own estate in Savennières, with the Clos de la Hutte at its centre and Chenin Blanc as his working base.

In 2016, a new cellar was built adjacent to Clos de la Hutte, giving Boudignon a new level of precision in his winemaking. His reputation grew swiftly: his wines are found on no less than 19 of France's three-Michelin-star restaurants. The domaine is listed by the commune of Savennières among its official wine producers.

== Viticulture and winemaking ==
The domaine's flagship vineyard, the Clos de la Hutte, is situated in La Possonnière and was once home to a monastery. Historically regarded among the finest sites of the Savennières appellation, it is considered on a par with Clos de la Coulée de Serrant and Roche aux Moines. In 2011, Boudignon planted 2.6 hectares of vines on pure schist using a massal selection of five different Chenin Blanc clones sourced from the best domaines in the Loire.

The vineyard has been certified organic since 2019, and operates as a sustainable ecosystem, with practices including rainwater recovery and the creation of vegetal compost. The cellar uses a Canadian well for thermoregulation through underground geothermal energy.

Harvest is completed entirely by hand, with successive passes through each vineyard to pick only at optimal maturity. Upon arrival at the winery, grapes are whole-bunch pressed with no settling, and the juice is kept cold before a long, slow fermentation with natural yeasts. Malolactic fermentation is not carried out automatically. The wines are aged on lees with minimal sulphur in a combination of barrels ranging from 300 to 600 litres, with progressively less new oak used across the range.

== Wines ==
The domaine produces wines under both the Savennières and Anjou Blanc appellations. Key cuvées include:

- Clos de la Hutte — the estate's flagship Savennières, from the ancient monastic site in La Possonnière, on pure schist soils
- Franc de Pied — produced from ungrafted vines within the Clos de la Hutte, in extremely small quantities
- Clos de Frémine — a Savennières from a separate parcel
- La Vigne Cendrée — from a 0.5-hectare parcel near Roche aux Moines, on purple schist and granite
- à François(e) — an Anjou Blanc named in honour of Boudignon's late mother Françoise and his father François
