= Badger Mountain Vineyard =

Winery in Kennewick, Washington

Coordinates: 46.2128429°N 119.2864613°W

Badger Mountain Vineyard is a winery in Kennewick, Washington, established by Bill Powers in 1982. It was the first winery in the state to be Certified Organic. The estate annually produces 45,000 cases of organic wine and 25,000 cases of conventional wine under the Powers Winery label. The operation uses solar power and recycled biodiesel for some of its energy needs. The winery creates its reserve wine from single vineyard cabernet sauvignon from four different AVAs.

In 2010, Bill Powers was inducted into the Legends of Washington Hall of Fame; he died in 2014. His son continues the business.
