= Evelyne de Pontbriand =

French winemaker (1950–2024)

- Born: Evelyne Bazin de Jessey; November 5, 1950; Paris, France
- Died: November 5, 2024 (aged 73); Angers, France
- Education: Sorbonne University
- Occupations: Winemaker, proprietor
- Years active: 2001–2024
- Known for: Domaine du Closel – Château des Vaults
- Children: 4

Evelyne de Pontbriand (née Bazin de Jessey; November 23, 1950 – November 5, 2024) was a French winemaker and the proprietor of Domaine du Closel – Château des Vaults, a winery in the Savennières appellation of the Loire Valley. She managed the estate from 2001, implementing biodynamic viticulture practices and advocating for the Chenin Blanc grape through initiatives such as the Académie du Chenin and the Chenin Blanc International Congress.

== Early life and education ==
Evelyne Bazin de Jessey was born on November 23, 1950, in Paris, France. She spent much of her early life in Angers, near the Savennières appellation, where her family owned Domaine du Closel – Château des Vaults. Her parents, Jacques and Michèle Bazin de Jessey, owned the estate but did not intend for her to enter the family business.

She completed higher education in comparative literature at the Sorbonne University and studied fine arts at the École du Louvre, graduating in 1972. In 1973, she married Gaël de Pontbriand. After their marriage, the couple moved to Philadelphia, where her husband studied at the Wharton School. During this time, she worked in an art gallery and taught French. They later lived in Frankfurt, where she continued teaching, before returning to Paris in 1985.

== Career ==
In 2001, Pontbriand assumed leadership of Domaine du Closel following her mother Michèle Bazin de Jessey’s retirement. At that time, she was working for a nonprofit organization in Paris that assisted long-term unemployed individuals.

Pontbriand initiated the transition of the estate’s vineyards to organic farming in 2006 and completed their conversion to biodynamic practices in 2015. These methods included reducing chemical inputs, using natural groundcover, and employing ambient yeast during fermentation.

In 2008, she was elected president of the Savennières appellation, a position she held for eight years. During her tenure, she worked to unify the 36 growers in the appellation and elevate the global reputation of Savennières wines.

In 2017, she co-founded the Académie du Chenin, an organization focused on research and promotion of the Chenin Blanc grape. In 2019, she organized the first Chenin Blanc International Congress, which brought together winemakers and researchers to discuss improvements in viticulture and the grape’s reputation.

Domaine du Closel spans 15 hectares and features diverse terroirs, including schist, sandstone, and quartz soils. Pontbriand emphasized producing wines that reflected these unique characteristics and adapted production techniques to preserve the wines’ minerality and acidity. She expanded the estate’s offerings to include cultural tourism, organizing events such as baroque music concerts and literary festivals.

== Personal life ==
Evelyne and Gaël de Pontbriand had four children. She died on November 5, 2024, in Angers, France, due to cancer.
