= Loire Valley (wine) =

French wine region

- Wine region
- Country: France
- Sub-regions: Anjou, Pays Nantais, Saumur, Touraine, Centre-Val de Loire
- Size of planted vineyards: 185,000 acres (750 km^{2})
- Grapes produced: Chenin blanc, Sauvignon blanc, Cabernet franc, Melon de Bourgogne, Gamay, Pinot noir and more
- Wine produced: Still, sparkling wine, dessert wine, rosé

The Loire Valley wine region includes the French wine regions situated along the river Loire from the Muscadet region on the Atlantic coast to the region of Sancerre and Pouilly-Fumé just southeast of the city of Orléans in north central France. In between are the regions of Anjou wine, Saumur, Bourgueil, Chinon, and Vouvray. The Loire Valley itself follows the river through the Loire department to the river's origins in the Cévennes but most of the wine production takes place in the regions noted above. The area includes 87 appellations under the Appellation d'origine contrôlée (AOC) and Indication Géographique Protégée (IGP) systems.

While the majority of production in the Loire Valley is white wine from the Chenin blanc, Sauvignon blanc and Melon de Bourgogne grapes, there are red wines made (especially around the Chinon region) from Cabernet franc. In addition to still wines, rosé, sparkling and dessert wines are also produced. With Crémant production throughout the Loire, it is the second largest sparkling wine producer in France after Champagne. Among these different wine styles, Loire wines tend to exhibit characteristic fruitiness with fresh, crisp flavors-especially in their youth. The Loire Valley has a long history of winemaking dating back to the 1st century. In the High Middle Ages, the wines of the Loire Valley were some of the most esteemed wines in England and France, almost as prized as wines from Bordeaux.

== History ==
Archaeological evidence suggest that the Romans planted the first vineyards in the Loire Valley during their settlement of Gaul in the 1st century AD. By the 5th century, the flourishing viticulture of the area was noted in a publication by the poet Sidonius Apollinaris. In his work the History of the Franks, Bishop Gregory of Tours wrote of the frequent plundering by the Bretons of the area's wine stocks. By the 11th century the wines of Sancerre had a reputation across Europe for their high quality. In the High Middle Ages, the wines of the Loire Valley were the most esteemed wines in England and France, even more prized than those from Bordeaux.

== Climate and geography ==
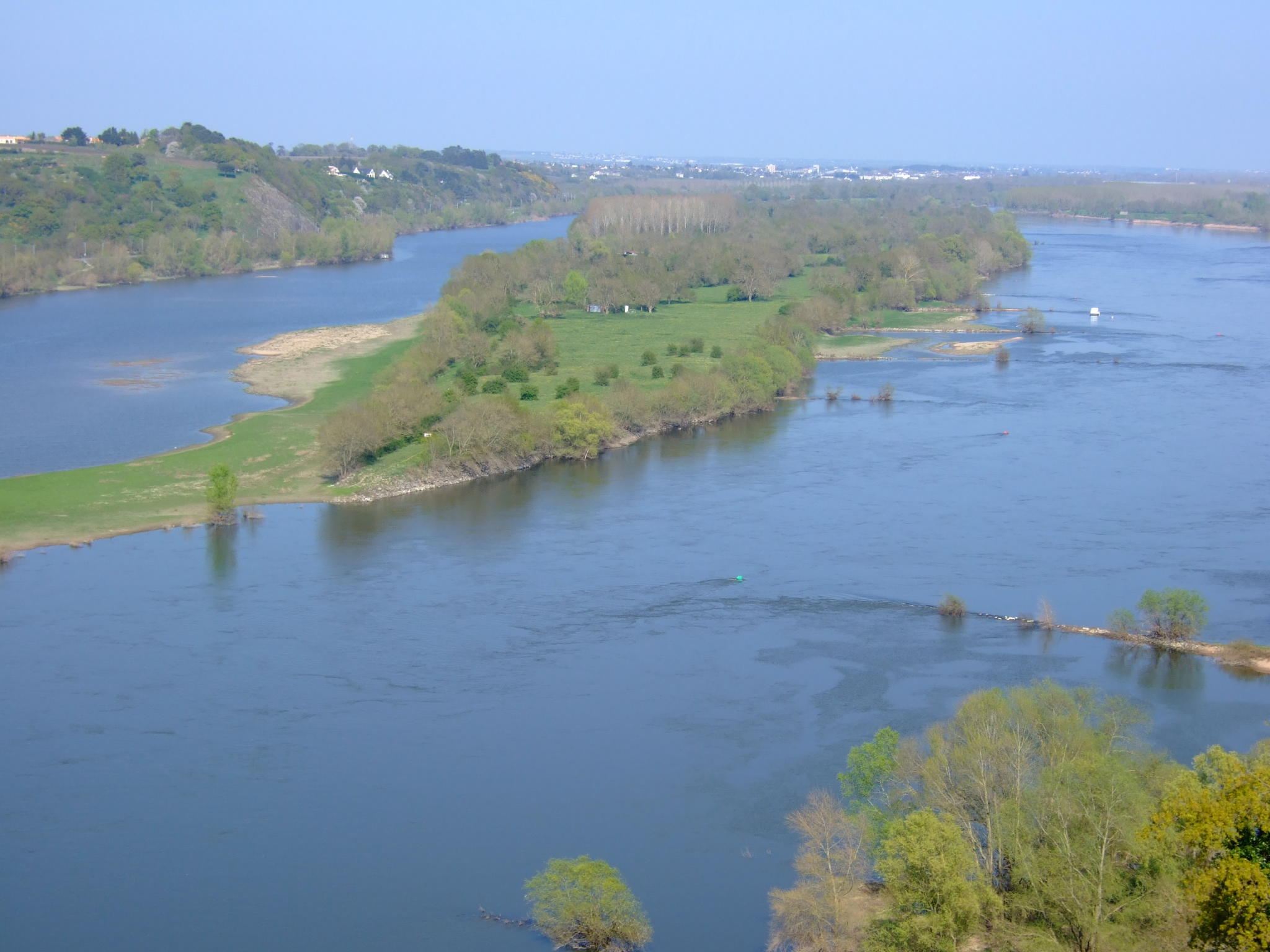
The Loire River near the town of Champtoceaux in the Anjou wine region.

The Loire river has a significant effect on the mesoclimate of the region, adding the necessary extra few degrees of temperature that allows grapes to grow when the areas to the north and south of the Loire Valley have shown to be unfavorable to viticulture. In addition to finding vineyards along the Loire, several of the river's tributaries are also well planted-including the rivers Allier, Cher, Indre, Loir, Sèvre Nantaise and Vienne. The area has a continental climate that is influenced heavily by the Loire and the Atlantic Ocean at the western edge of the region. The climate can be very cool with spring time frost being a potential hazard for the vines. During the harvest months rain can cause the grapes to be harvested under ripe but can also aid in the development of Botrytis cinerea for the region's dessert wines.

Temperature, rainfall and average sunshine time in Angers (Anjou):

Month	Jan	Feb	March	Apr	May	June	July	Aug	Sept	Oct	Nov	Dec	Year
Average minimum temperature (°C)	2,1	2,2	3,9	5,6	8,9	11,8	13,6	13,4	11,3	8,4	4,6	2,8	7,4
Average temperature (°C)	5	5,7	8,2	10.4	13,9	16,2	19,2	19,1	16,5	12,7	8	5,6	11,8
Average maximum temperature (°C)	7,9	9,2	12,6	15,3	19	22,6	24,9	24,7	21,8	17	11,4	8,4	16,2
Average monthly rainfall (mm)	62,1	50,8	51,7	44,6	54,4	41,2	43,8	44,9	52,2	59,6	64,5	63,4	633,4
Monthly hours of sunshine (hour/month)	70	92	141	179	201	234	248	237	191	129	89	65	1877
Source : Climatology from 1947 to 2008 - Angers, France

== Viticulture and winemaking ==
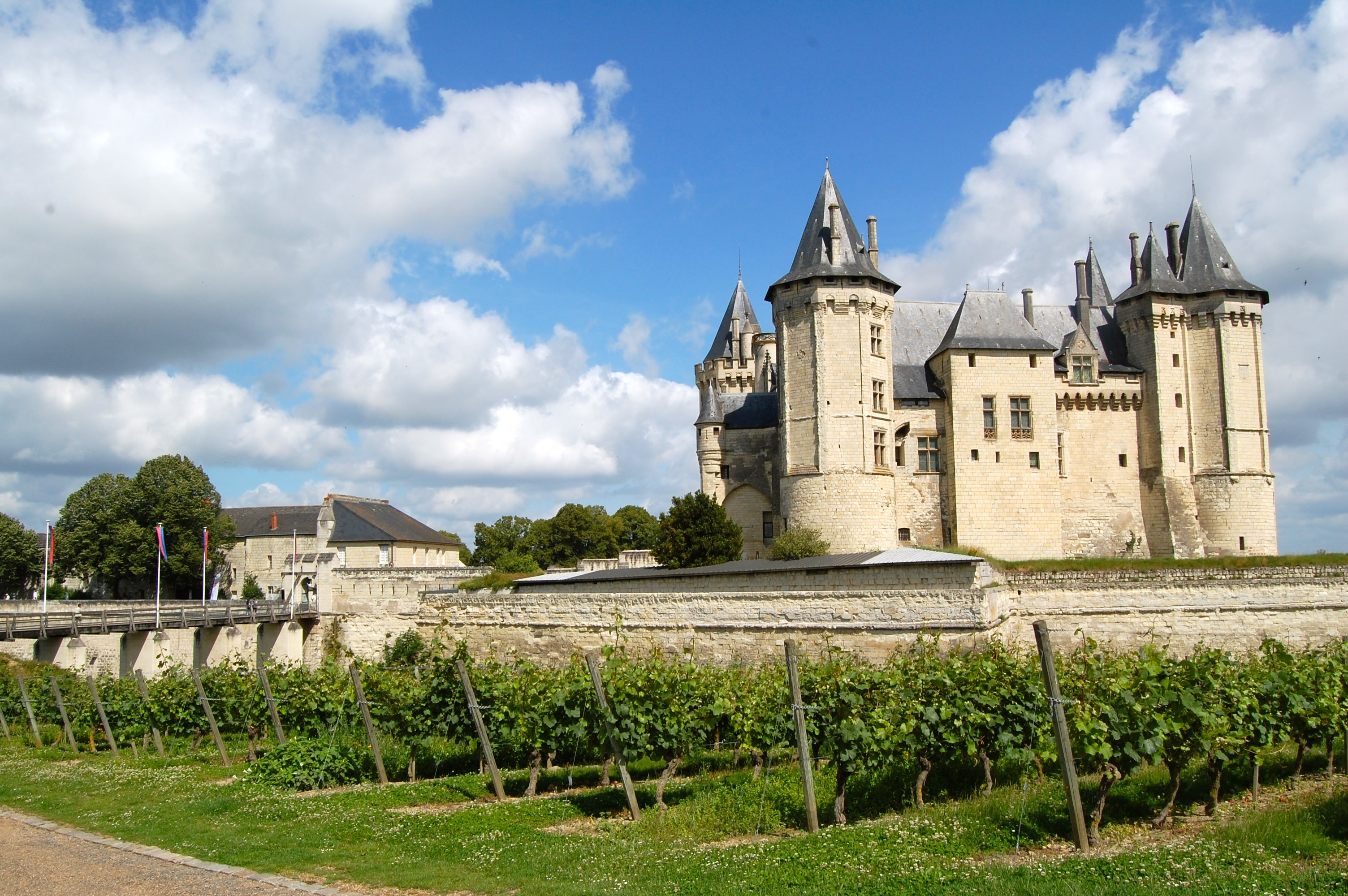
Vineyard in the Loire Valley near Saumur

With over 185,000 acres (750 km^{2}) planted under vine, the Loire Valley is about two-thirds the size of the Bordeaux wine region. Due to its location and marginal climate, the overall quality of a vintage has a dramatic effect on the quality of the region's wines—more so than with other French wine regions. The most common hazard is that the cool climate will prevent the grapes from ripening fully and developing the sugars needed to balance the naturally high acidity of the grapes. During these cool vintages the Sauvignon blanc based wines are lighter in color, less fruity and have more pronounced mineral notes. The Cabernet franc based wines are also lighter in color with more vegetal or "weed"-like aromas. In riper vintages, a Loire Cabernet franc will develop aromas of raspberries and lead pencil shavings.

The Loire Valley has a high density of vine plantings with an average of 1,600-2,000 vines per acre (4,000-5,000 per hectare). Some Sancerre vineyards have as many as 10,000 plants per hectare. With more vines competing for the same limited resources in the soil, the density is designed to compensate for the excessive yields that some of the grape varieties, like Chenin blanc, are prone to have. In recent times, pruning and canopy management have started to limit yields more effectively.

Winemaking in the Loire is characterised by a general avoidance of barrel ageing and malolactic fermentation. However some winemakers have begun experimenting with both. Chaptalization is permitted here and can help wine makers compensate for the under ripeness of the grapes in some years. For red wines there has been more emphasis on extending the maceration time of skin contact in order to bring out more color and tannins into the wine. Temperature control is also an important consideration with the cold autumn weather sometimes requiring that the must be heated in order to complete fermentation fully.

== Wine regions ==
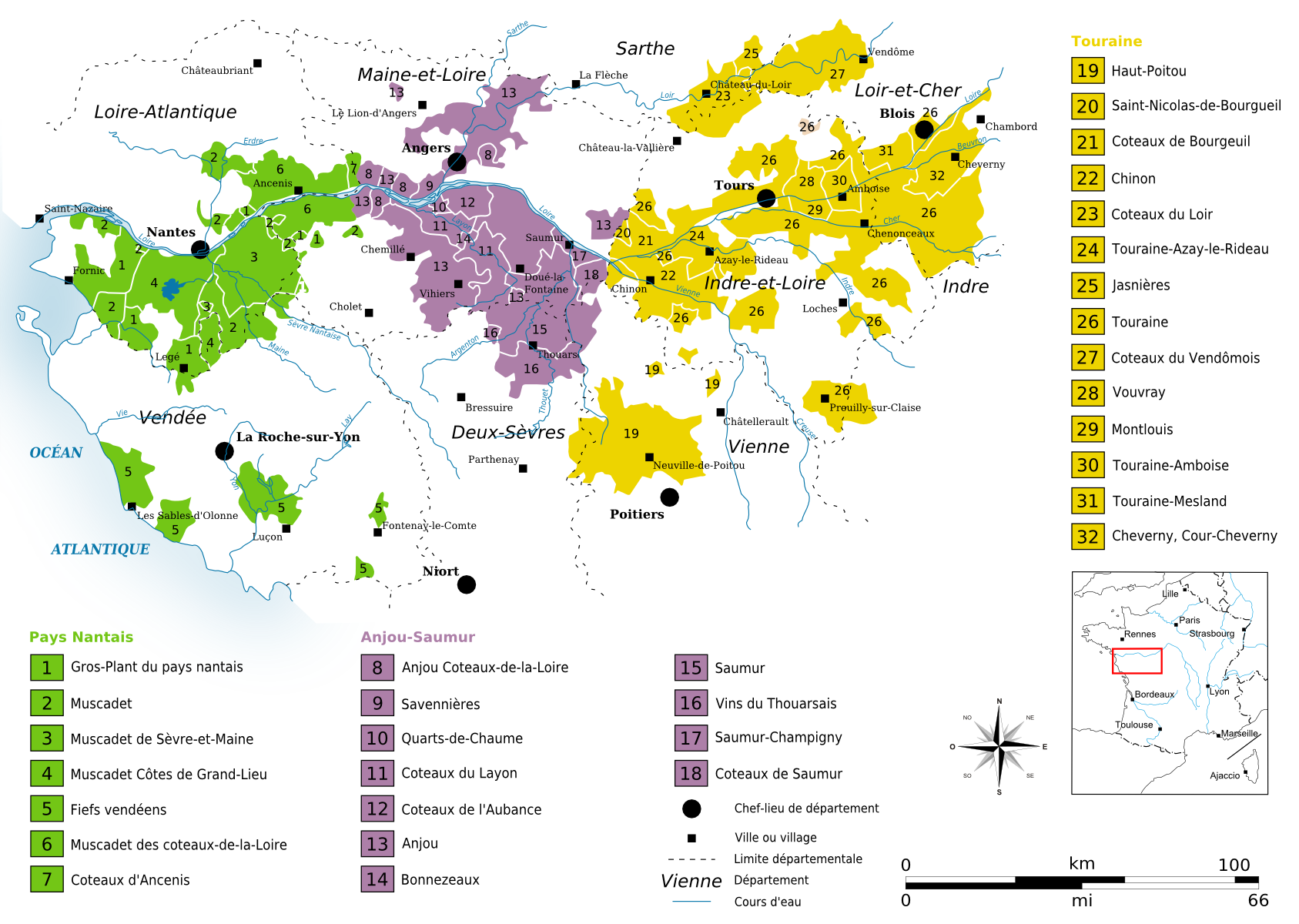

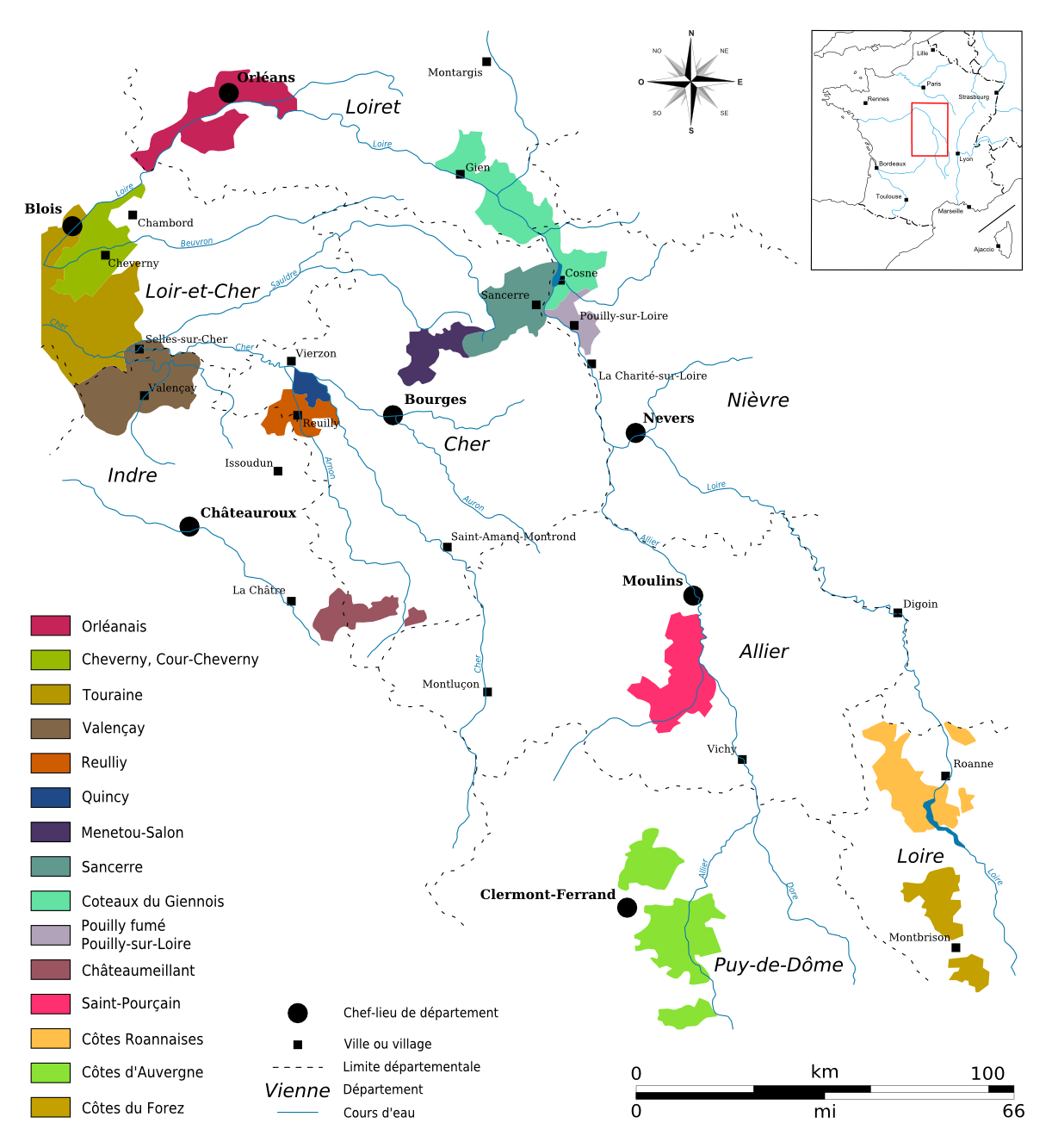

The Loire Valley is often divided into three sections. The Upper Loire includes the Sauvignon blanc dominated areas of Sancerre and Pouilly-Fumé. The Middle Loire is dominated by more Chenin blanc and Cabernet franc wines found in the regions around Touraine, Saumur, Chinon and Vouvray. The Lower Loire that leads to the mouth of the river's entrance to the Atlantic goes through the Muscadet region which is dominated by wines of the Melon de Bourgogne grape. Spread out across the Loire Valley are 87 appellations under the AOC, VDQS and Vin de Pays systems. There are two generic designations that can be used across the whole of the Loire Valley. The Crémant de Loire which refers to any sparkling wine made according to the traditional method of Champagne. The Vin de Pays du Jardin de la France refers to any varietally labeled wine, such as Chardonnay, that is produced in the region outside of an AOC designation.

=== Sancerre & Pouilly-Fumé ===
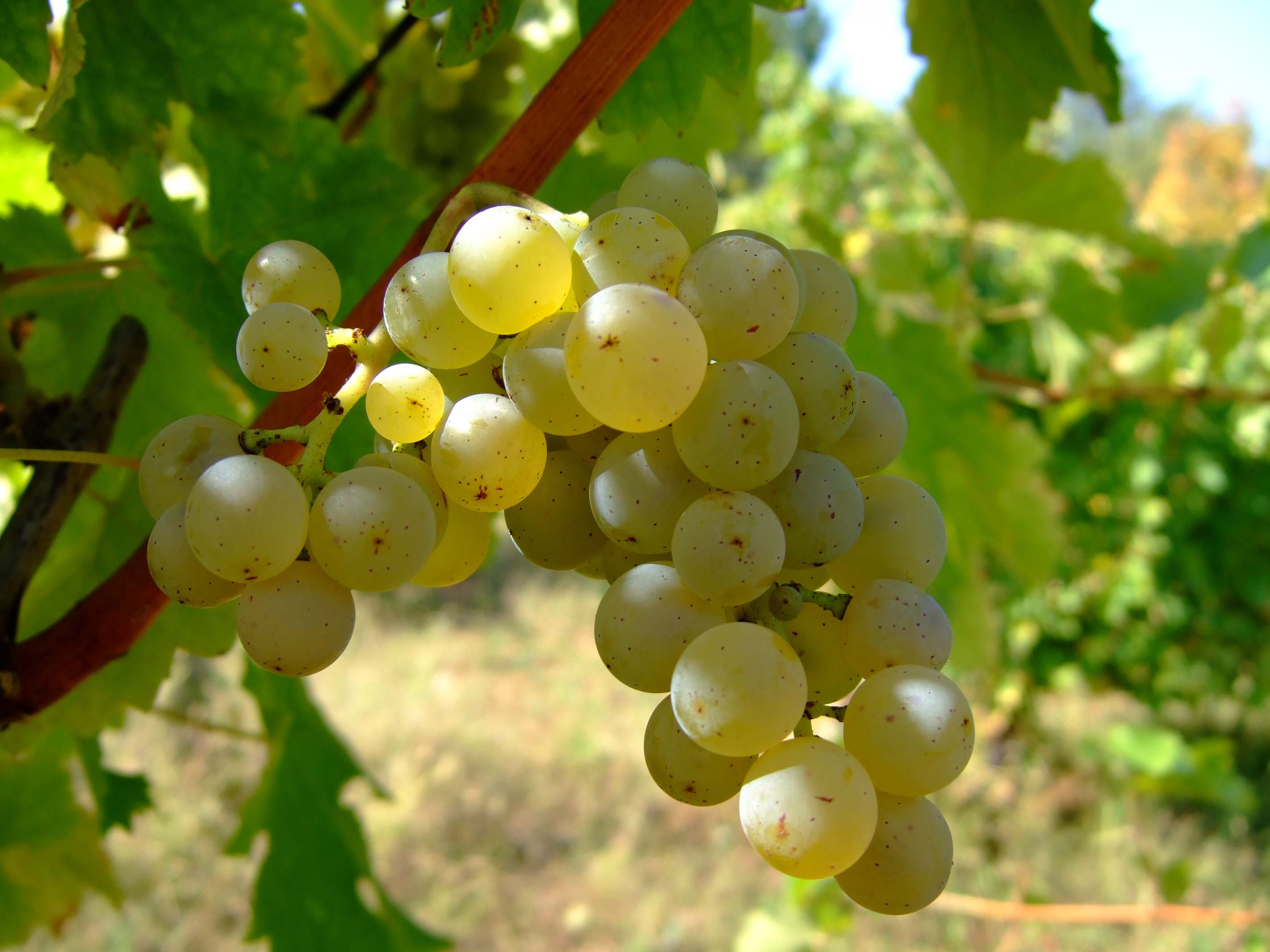
Sauvignon blanc is the principal grape of Sancerre and Pouilly-Fumé.

Sauvignon blanc and Pinot noir are the principal grapes of this region that is centered around the appellation of Sancerre and Pouilly-Fumé. The two towns of Sancerre and Pouilly-sur-Loire (where Pouilly-Fumé is made) sit on opposite sides of the Loire river with Sancerre being about 10 miles (16 km) to the northwest of Pouilly. The Fumé is said to come from the silex flint interspersed with the limestone in the area that can give a smoky gunflint note to the wine. Another possibility for the name is the early morning fog created by the Loire river that can blanket the vineyards. Wines labeled with just Pouilly or Pouilly-sur-Loire are often made from the Chasselas grape.

Unlike many areas of France, the Sancerre region is heavily mechanized with the use of mechanical harvesting rather than hand pickers. One of the best known producers in the region is Didier Dageneau who, until his death in 2008, was an influential voice in the area advocating the reduction of yields and the use of organic viticulture. Pouilly-Fumé only produces white wines while Sancerre produces red, white and rosé wines. The white Sauvignon blanc based wines from this region has characteristic gooseberry and grapefruit flavors with the Pouilly-Fumé version typically being more full bodied and rich in texture. The red Pinot noir wines are very light in both body and color that are not very similar to other French expression of the grape like those in Burgundy. Smaller appellations in the region include-

- Menetou-Salon - White, red and rosé
- Quincy - White wine
- Reuilly - White, red and rosé

The region was under the influence of the Duchy of Burgundy for most of its history which partly the reason why plantings were once heavily dominated by the Pinot noir grape. The Phylloxera epidemic of the 19th century altered that dynamic when many of the Pinot noir vineyards were wiped out by the louse. In their place, plantings of the easier to cultivate Sauvignon blanc vine began to increase. While there are still isolated batches of Pinot noir in the region, Sauvignon blanc is now the most heavily planted.

=== Anjou-Saumur ===
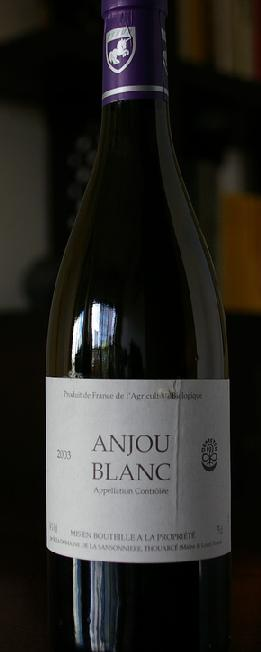
Many Loire Valley wines are released in Burgundy style wine bottles.

The Anjou region of the Middle Loire is situated around the town of Angers and is known primarily for the rosé wines based on the Grolleau and Cabernet franc, including the Rosé d'Anjou and the Cabernet d'Anjou. White wine made from the Chenin blanc is known as Anjou Blanc while Anjou Rouge is often made from Gamay. Some of the higher quality wines are often labeled with the AOC designation Anjou-Villages. The Chenin blanc grape has been planted in the region since at least 845 AD when it was planted at the Abbey of Glanfeuil. Throughout the years it was known in the region under a variety of synonyms including Pineau de la Loire and Franc-blanc.

The area around Saumur is the third largest sparkling wine appellation in France after the Champagne region and the Crémant d'Alsace AOC with more than 12 million bottles of Saumur Mousseux produced each year. Unlike Champagne which is made with Chardonnay, Pinot noir and Pinot Meunier, Saumur sparkling wine is based on the Chenin blanc grape. The area around Saumur-Champigny produces red wine based on the Cabernet franc grape that is similar in profile to the wines produced in St-Nicolas-de-Bourgueil.

=== Vouvray and Touraine ===
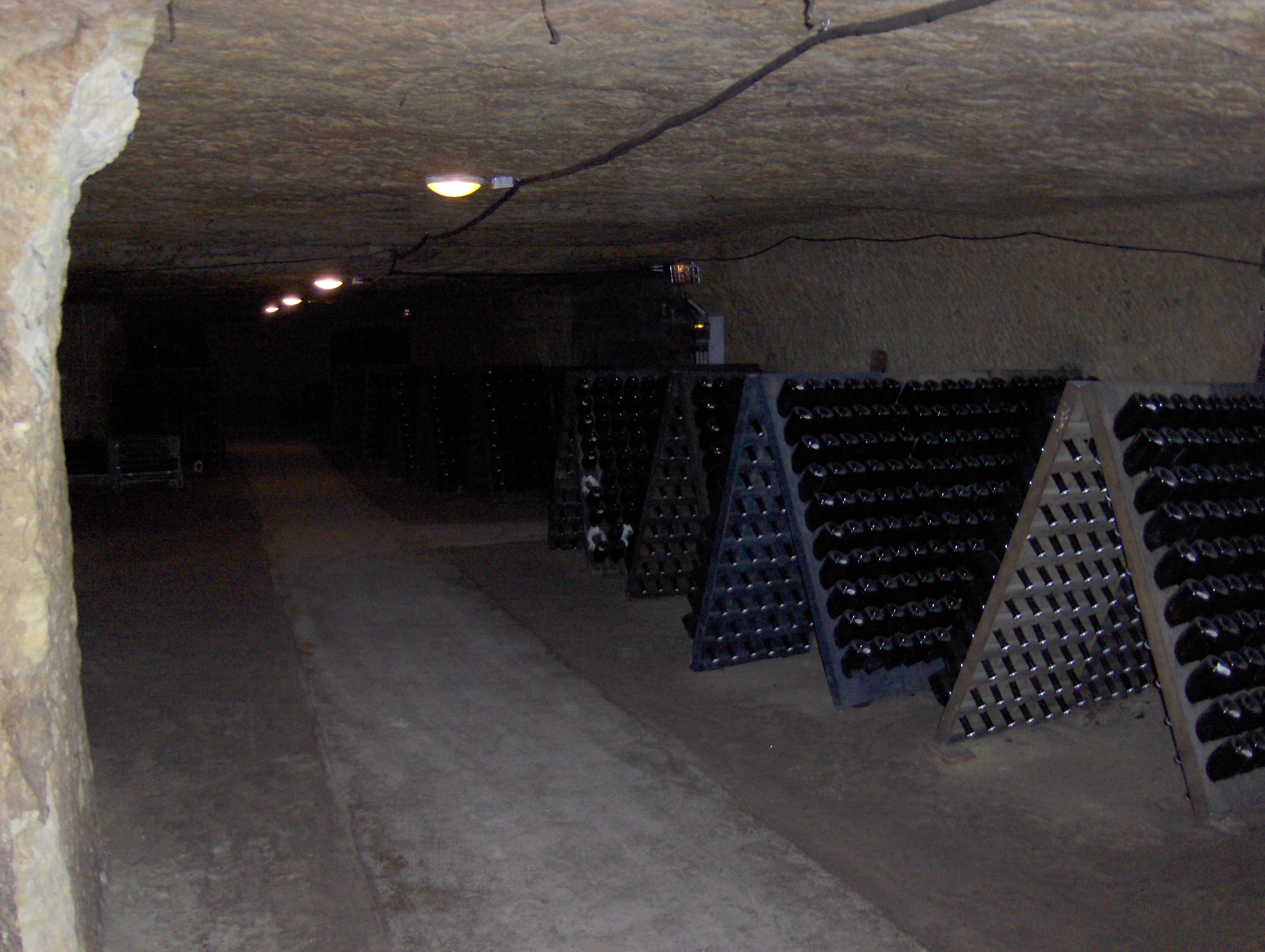
Winemakers in the region build underground wine caves out of tuffeau limestone, as in the Champagne region, in order to store wine at an ideal temperature and humidity.

The region around Vouvray, Montlouis-sur-Loire and Touraine has some of the most diverse plantings of all the Loire region and makes a wide variety of white, red and rosé wines. For white wines the main grape is Chenin blanc but Sauvignon blanc and (to a smaller extent) Chardonnay are also planted. For red wines the main grape is Cabernet franc with some smaller plantings of Cabernet Sauvignon, Gamay and Malbec. The rosé wines are made from an assortment of Gamay, Pineau d'aunis, Pinot gris and Pinot noir. The villages of Vouvray and Montlouis are the largest appellations in the region and make only white wines from Chenin blanc. The wines can vary in sweetness from bone dry (often appearing as sec on the wine label) to very sweet moelleux wines that are often infected by noble rot.

For years the Touraine region would compete with the Beaujolais region for the release of an early bottling of Gamay that would rival the Beaujolais nouveau. While the competition is not so much of a focal point now, there are still some producers who release early bottlings of the wine around the same time as Beaujolais. The soil around the Touraine area is a variety of limestone with excellent drainage that is known as tuffeau which is the same material used to build many of the famous Loire Valley Châteaux.

=== Chinon ===
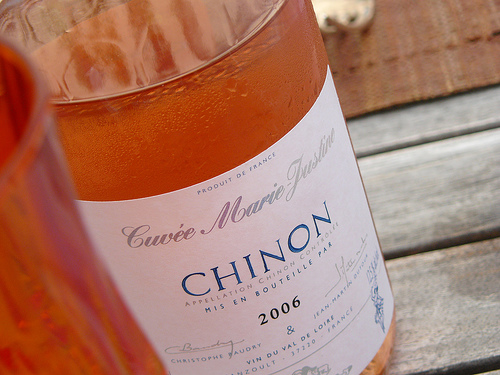
A Chinon rosé wine made from Cab franc.

The area around Chinon, Bourgueil and Saint-Nicolas-de-Bourgueil produces the majority of the Loire Valley's red wine based on the Cabernet franc grape—known in this areas as Breton. The wines of the Chinon area are the softest and rich expression of the grape while the Bourgueil area produces more tannic and firm wines. The St-Nicolas-de-Bourgueil area produces the lightest colored wines. In the 19th century, the wines of the Chinon area were compared favorably by critics to the wines of Château Margaux and even today is considered some of the best expression of the Cabernet franc grape. The wines from this region can achieve a nice purple color with notes of raspberry fruit and graphite. Unlike Cabernet franc from warmer climates, Chinon are typically served slightly cooler than most red wine.

=== Muscadet ===
The Muscadet region is located in the Pays Nantais in historical Brittany. In the 17th century, Dutch wine merchants laid the foundation for the Muscadet style by encouraging the villagers of Nantes to plant the early ripening Melon de Bourgogne grape to use in the production of their brandewijn—distilled wine with brandy added to it. Following the devastation in 1709 of winter frost to many of the vineyards in the Pays Nantais, King Louis XIV ordered that the frost resistant Melon de Bourgogne grape be given preferential treatment in the replanting of the area. Despite the inference of "Muskiness" in its name, Muscadet is a neutral flavor wine and the Melon de Bourgogne grape has no relation to the Muscat family of grapes. The area's four appellation all produces white wine made from the Melon de Bourgogne grape. The appellations are-

- Muscadet-Sèvre et Maine
- Muscadet-Côtes de Grand Lieu
- Muscadet-Coteaux de la Loire
- Muscadet- A generic appellation covering the whole of the Loire-Atlantique department.

The wines of the Muscadet-Sèvre et Maine and Muscadet-Côtes de Grand Lieu appellation are often bottled sur lie straight from the tank that they are fermented in without any racking or filtering. This create wines that can be very cloudy and require decanting to remove sediments but also produces wines that can be fuller bodied and show extra dimensions of freshness.

=== Fiefs-vendéens ===
South of Nantes in the Vendée is the small (330ha) appellation of Fiefs-vendéens. It was created as an appellation in 2011, after having been a VDQS since 1963. It comprises the five ''dénominations'' of Brem, Chantonnay, Mareuil, Pissotte and Vix.

== Varieties ==
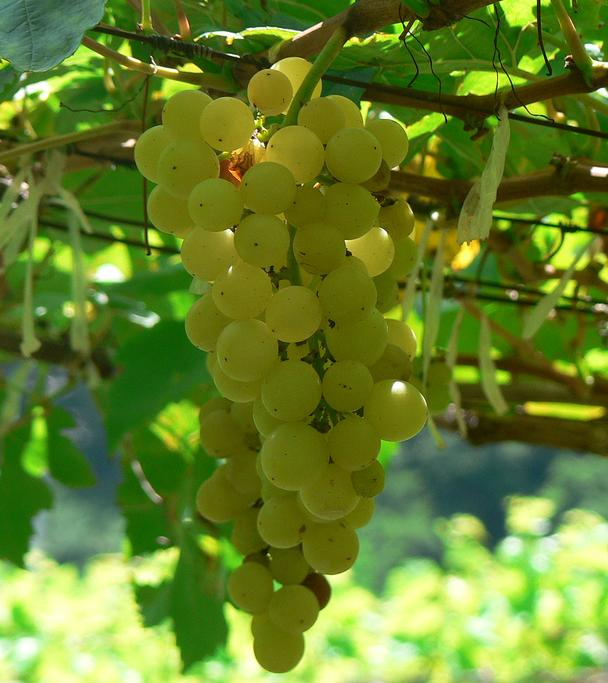
Chenin blanc grapes

The white wines of the Coteaux du Layon, Montlouis-sur-Loire, Savennières, and Vouvray are based on Chenin blanc and are known for their high acidity when young and ability to develop and age well. The villages of Sancerre and Pouilly-sur-Loire are known for their crisp and herbaceous Sauvignon blancs. Some producers in the area are experimenting with oak aging their Sauvignon blanc to give them more rounder and softer appeal. The villages of Bourgueil, Chinon and Saumur are known for their Cabernet franc based wines that range from light and fruity in Saumur to rich and velvety in Chinon. The Muscadet wines from the Pays de la Loire are made from the Melon de Bourgogne grape and are known for their citrus and mineral notes.

In addition to the main production grapes, several local grapes are also used to make wine in smaller quantities. These include the Tressallier grape of Saint-Pourçain-sur-Sioule, the Romorantin of Cheverny, the Menu pineau and Groslot of Touraine and the Gros Plant of Nantes. There is also some plantings of Cabernet Sauvignon, Chardonnay, Gamay, Malbec, Pineau d'aunis, and Pinot gris, Pinot noir.

A characteristic of many Loire wines (both red and white) is the high acidity which highlights the fresh, crisp flavors of their youth only to go through a "dumb phase" between 2 and 5 years of age when the wines flavors are drastically toned down. Many of the better made examples come out of this period with their full palate of flavors and can continue to age well into 20 years. Some of the Sauvignon blanc based wines like Sancerre buck this trend and instead stay more low key till their third year when they mature and develop their full assortment of flavors before they eventually fade around their 7-10th year. However the best made examples in top vintages can often live much longer. Some classic examples of Vouvray can even reach the levels of longevity commonly associated with Port.

== Wineries ==
Historically the wineries of the Loire Valley have been small, family owned operations that do a lot of estate bottling. The mid-1990s saw an increase in the number of négociant and co-operative to where now about half of Sancerre and almost 80% of Muscadet is bottled by a négociant or co-op.

== See also ==
- Clos de la Coulée de Serrant - Nicolas Joly
- Domaine du Closel - Château des Vaults - Evelyne de Pontbriand
- Thibaud Boudignon winery - Thibaud Boudignon
- Maison Jaune winery - Jean-Claude Taddeï
- Baumard winery
- Château de Fesles winery
- Domaine Huet
