= Organic wine =

Wine made from grapes in the principles of organic farming

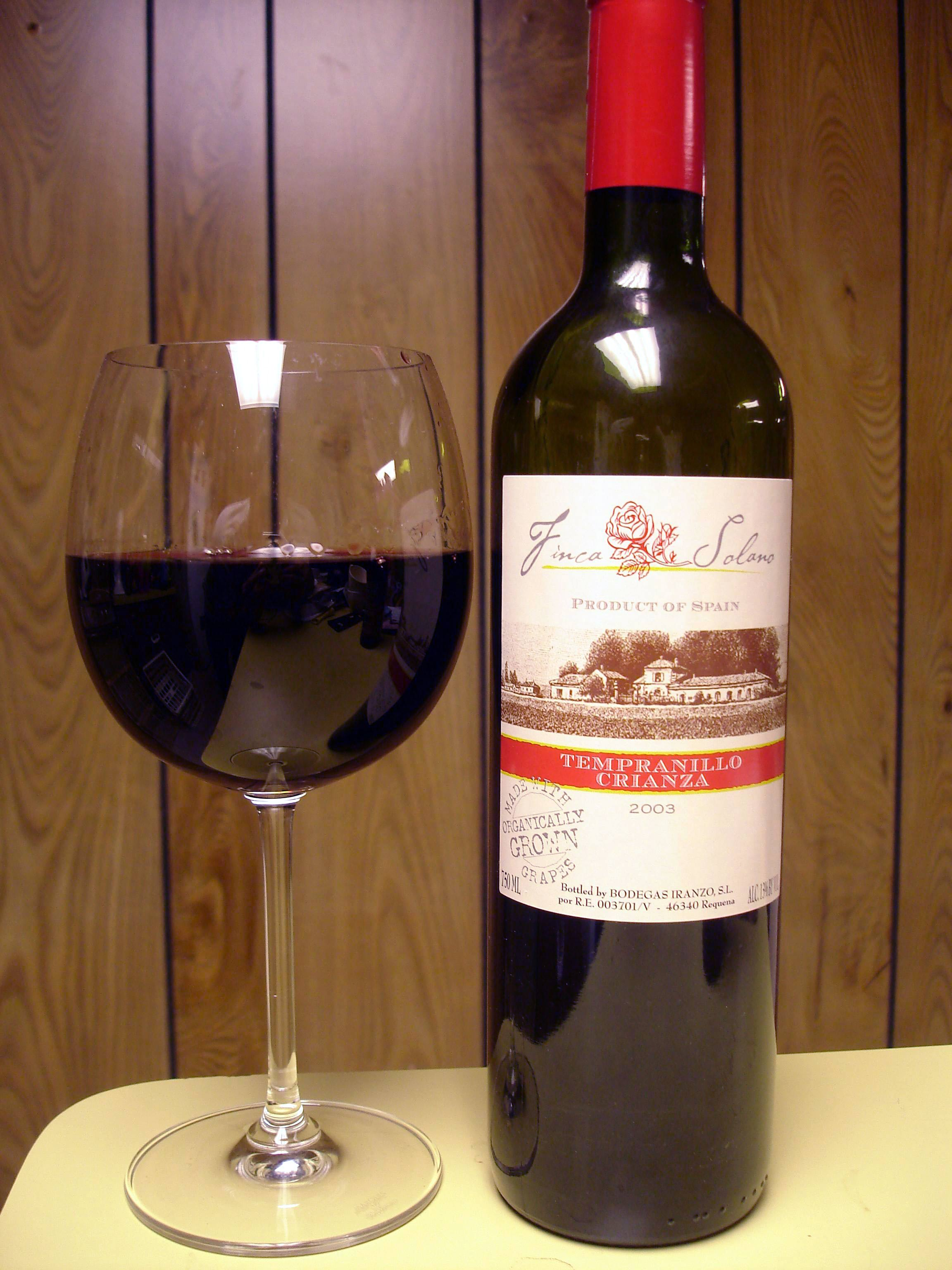
Organic wine

Organic wine is wine made from grapes grown in accordance with the principles of organic farming, which exclude the use of artificial chemical fertilizers, pesticides, fungicides, and herbicides. The legal definition of organic wine varies from country to country, with the European Union setting harmonised rules for all its member countries.

== Background ==
Data indicates the consumption of organic wine grew at a rate of 3.7% over the year ending September 19, 2009, exceeding growth (of 2%) in the consumption of non-organic wine during a similar period. According to industry data, there are approximately 1,500–2,000 organic wine producers globally, including negociant labels, with more than 885 organic domains in France alone.

== Production and preservatives ==
For wine produced in the European Union, the addition of sulfites used as preservatives is permitted in organic wine, but at lower maximum levels than in conventional wine production. In other countries, the preservative is not permitted at all in organic wine. In the United States, wines certified "organic" under the National Organic Program cannot contain added sulfites, but wines labelled as "wine made from organic grapes" can.

A 2017 study conducted by the UMR Moisa (Supagro Montpellier/Inra), found that an organic wine farm creates 1.5 times more jobs than a non-organic wine farm. The study reported that 34.6% of organic farms employ one or more permanent employees, compared to 21.6% in the case of non-certified farms. Similarly, 71.49% of employees are full-time, compared to 66.83% on non-organic farms.

== Organic certification ==
Organic certification of wine presents complexity due to different nations having different certification criteria. In the United Kingdom, organic wine is defined as wine made from organic grapes.

In the United States, regulations govern the organic winemaking process at all stages of production, including those related to harvesting, the types of yeast that can be used, as well as storage conditions. The National Organic Program, run by the United States Department of Agriculture, sets standards for certification of organic foods, including organic wines. These regulations apply to both imported and domestic wines that have acquired USDA certification. The total sulfite level must be less than 20 parts per million to receive organic certification.

A key distinction in defining organic wine relates to the use or non-use of preservatives, particularly sulfur (sulfur dioxide and sulfites), during the winemaking process. In the US, no additional sulfites may be added to any organic product, including wine. In the European Union, sulfites are permitted in organic wine. Most other countries do not have their own standards. Another difference is that the label "Made with Organic Grapes" can be used in the US if the grapes used to make the wine are certified "organic", even if the wine has added sulfites (up to 100 parts per million) or uses non-native yeasts. Europe does not have a comparable label.

Issues related to labor rights in certifications have also been documented.

== Natural wine ==
Natural winemaking is a style characterized by using native yeasts in the fermentation process and minimal or no sulfur dioxide in the winemaking process. It may also involve wines that are unfined and unfiltered as well. Natural winemaking is not governed by laws in the U.S. and has no inspection or verification process unless it is a biodynamic wine.

== Sustainable wines ==
Some farmers implement sustainable farming practices. Examples include the use of composting and the cultivation of plants that attract insects that may be beneficial for the vines. Sustainable winemaking systems outlined in the Code of Sustainable Winegrowing Practices Workbook published by the California Sustainable Winegrowing Alliance (CSWA).

Environmental issues addressed by sustainable wine range from wildlife habitat and pest management, to soil health. Renewable energy and improvements in infrastructure such as capturing and recycling carbon dioxide from alcoholic fermentation also play a role.

== See also ==
- Organic movement
- Biodynamic wine
