= Saumur (wine) =

French wine region in the Loire Valley

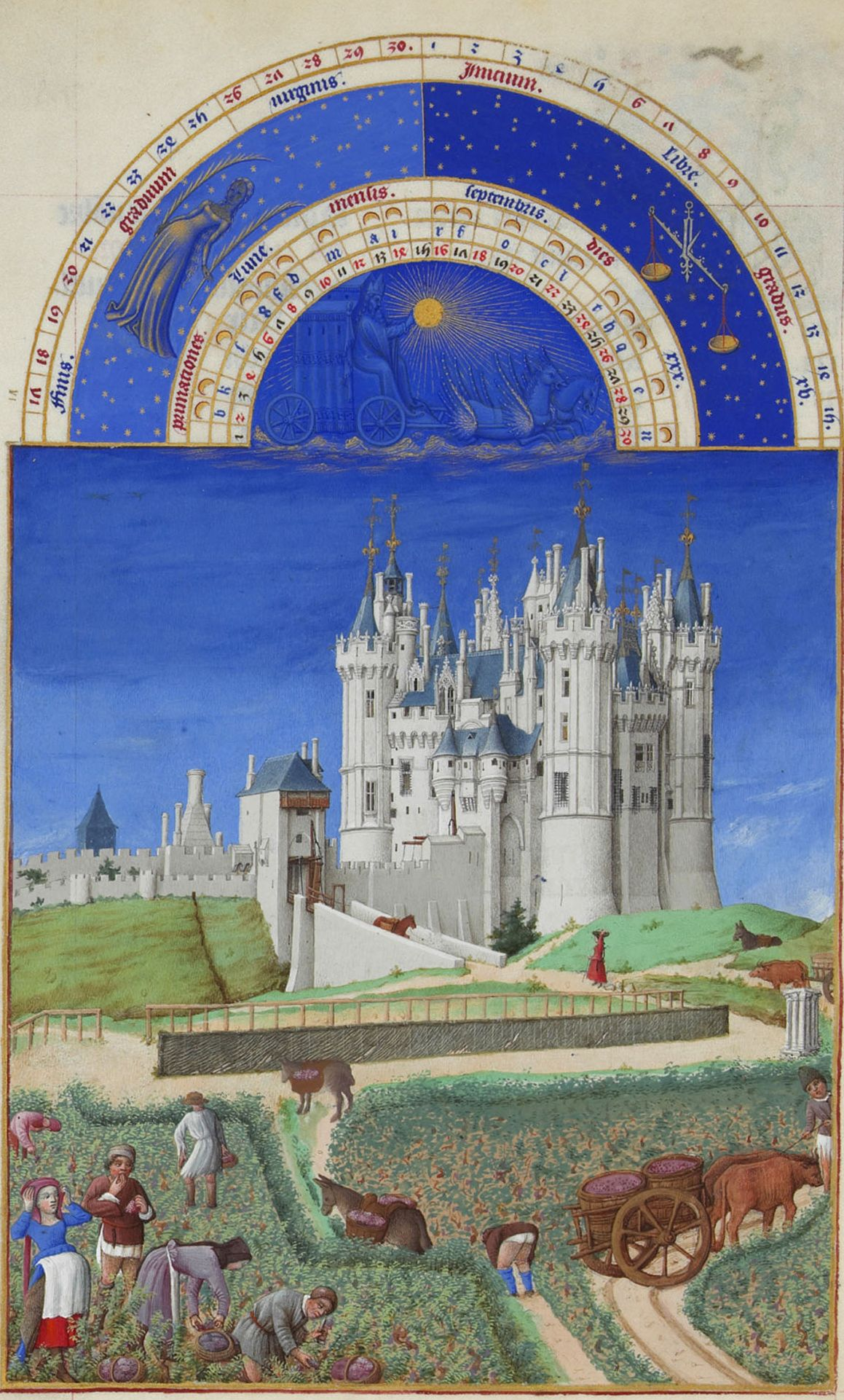
Château de Saumur as pictured in Très Riches Heures du Duc de Berry,

Saumur (French pronunciation: [somyʁ]) is a French wine region located in the Loire Valley. The region is noted for sparkling wines produced by the traditional method, and for red wines made primarily from Cabernet Franc. The main variety in the white wines is Chenin blanc.

The annual Grandes Tablées du Saumur-Champigny is a popular annual event held in early August with over 1 km of tables set up in Saumur so people can sample the local foods and wine.

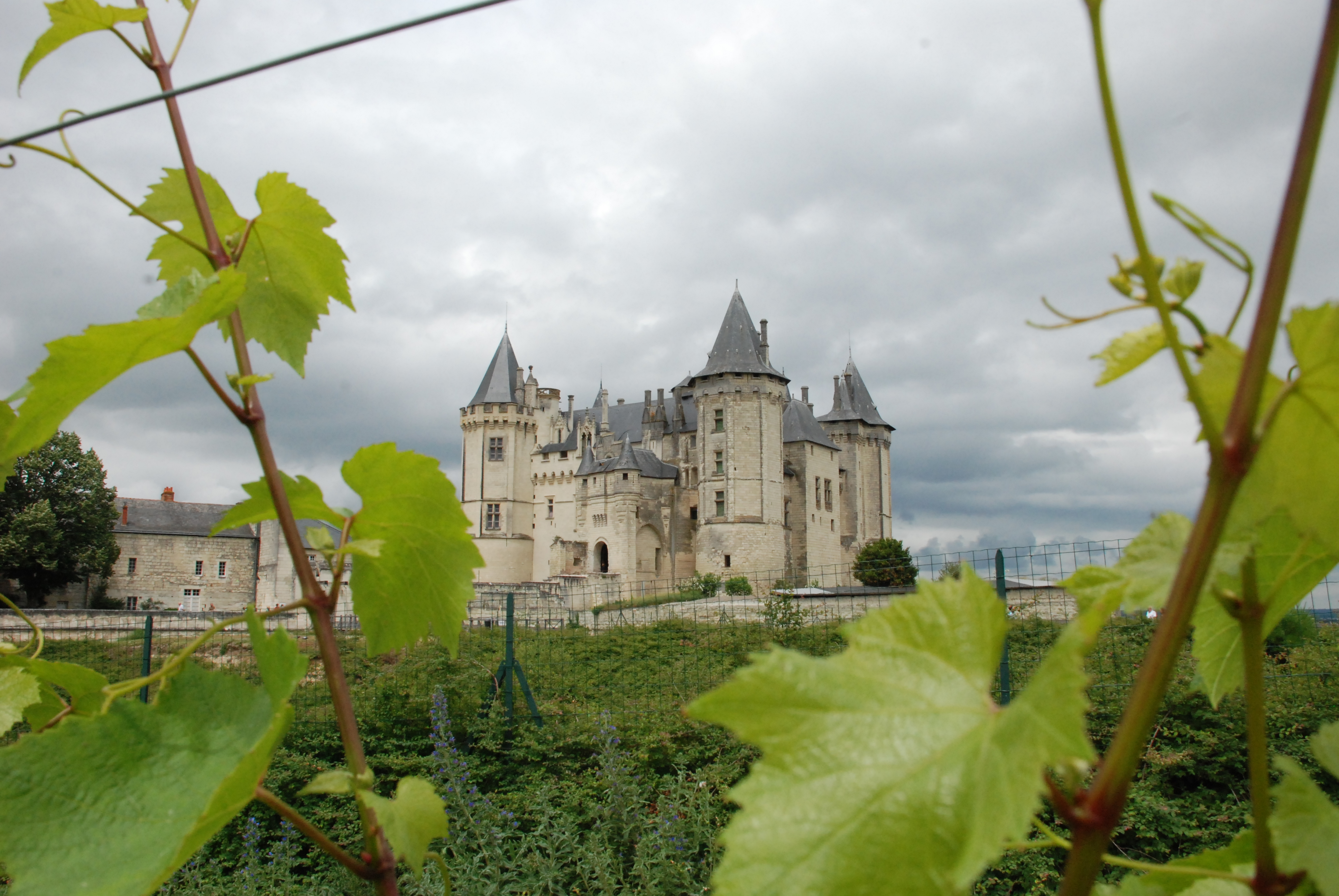
Château de Saumur, 2010

== Appellations ==
The following AOCs may be used for Saumur wines:

- Saumur - white, red or rosé
- Saumur-Champigny - red
- Coteaux de Saumur - sweet white
- Saumur mousseux - sparkling
- Cabernet de Saumur - for the rosé wines produced before 2015 (Saumur Rosé for 2016 and after)

== See also ==
- List of Vins de Primeur
