= Savennières =

- Commune
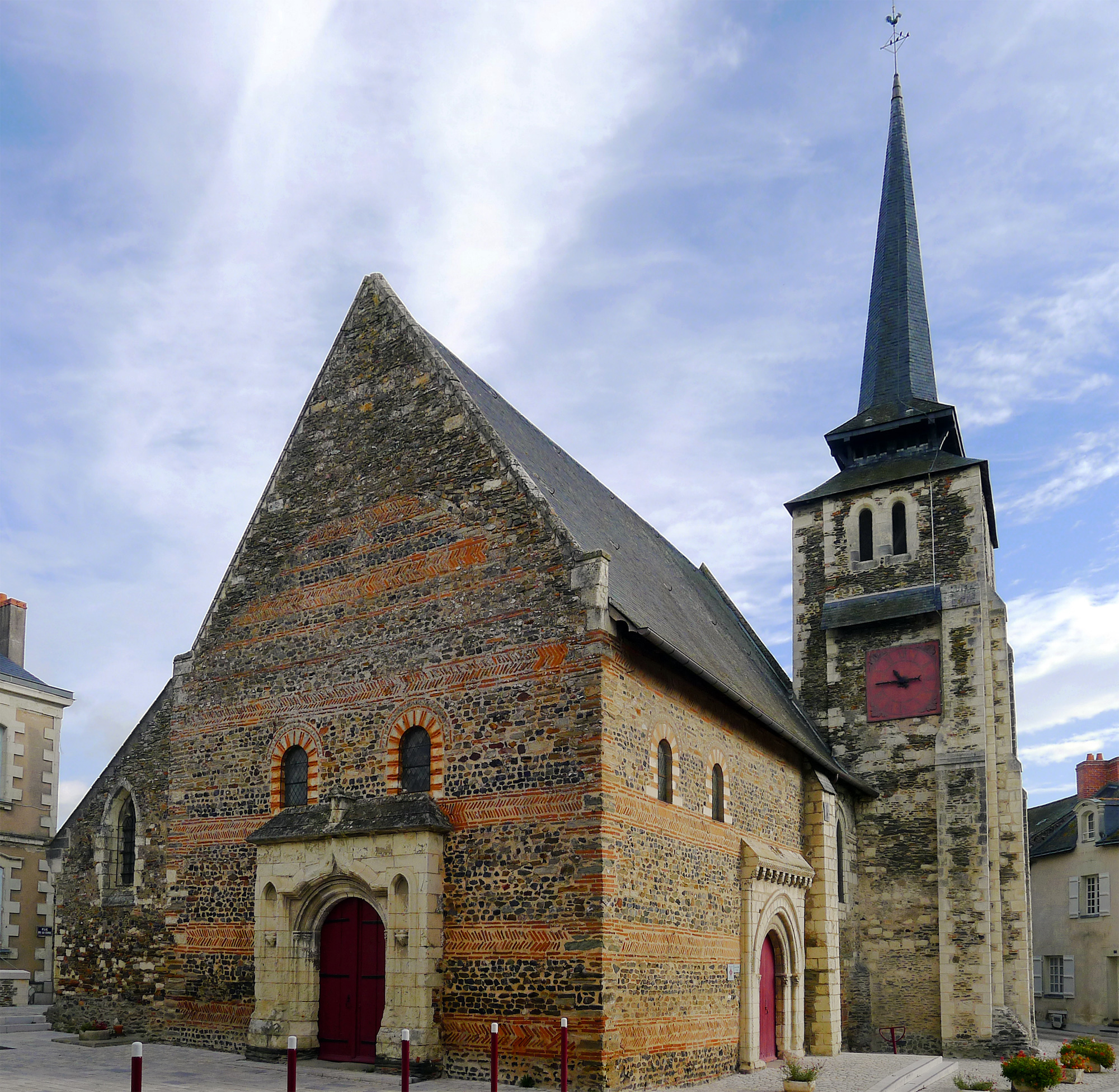
- The church in Savennières
- Location of Savennières
- Location within France Location within Pays de la Loire
- Coordinates: 47°23′02″N 0°39′23″W
- Country: France
- Region: Pays de la Loire
- Department: Maine-et-Loire
- Arrondissement: Angers
- Canton: Angers-3
- Intercommunality: CU Angers Loire Métropole

Government
  - Mayor (2020–2026): Jérémy Girault
- Area^{1}: 21.01 km^{2} (8.11 sq mi)
- Elevation: 20 m (66 ft)
- Highest elevation: 77 m (253 ft)
- Lowest elevation: 12 m (39 ft)
- Population (2023): 1,349
  - Density: 64.21/km^{2} (166.3/sq mi)
- Time zone: UTC+01:00 (CET)
  - Summer (DST): UTC+02:00 (CEST)
- INSEE/Postal code: 49329 /49170
- ^{1} French Land Register data, which excludes lakes, ponds, glaciers > 1 km^{2} (0.386 sq mi or 247 acres) and river estuaries.

Savennières (French pronunciation: [savənjɛʁ]) is a commune in the Maine-et-Loire department in western France.

It lies near the river Loire 15 km (9.3 mi) south west of Angers and is best known for its production of highly rated white wine.

With production predominantly centred on the Chenin blanc grape, it is famed for its particularly long-lasting dry white wine comparable to that of Vouvray.

== Savennières wine ==
The area around Savennières is used for the production of white wine from Chenin blanc grapes. The wines are mostly dry, often produced in a powerful style, and the best examples (such as those produced by Nicolas Joly's Château de la Roche aux Moines) are highly regarded by international wine critics. The Savennières Appellation d'Origine Controlée (AOC) spreads over 3 hills of schist, located on the right (northwest) bank of the Loire river, totaling about 300 hectares, of which about half are currently in production.

== See also ==
- French wine
