= Coteaux du Layon =

French wine geographic appellation

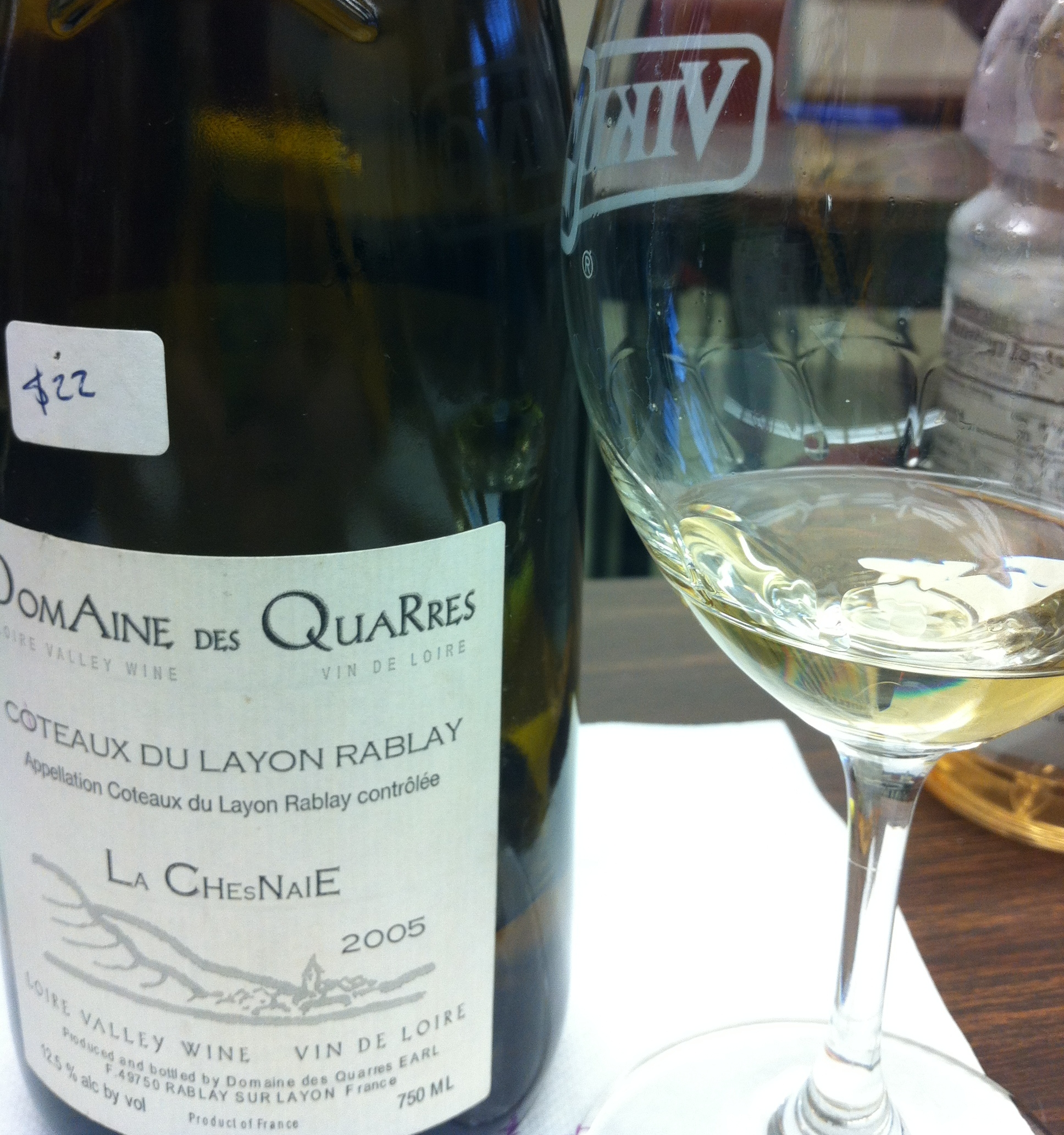
A wine from Rablay-sur-Layon.

Coteaux du Layon (French pronunciation: [kɔto dy lɛjɔ̃]) is an Appellation d'origine contrôlée (AOC) for sweet white wine in the Loire Valley wine region of France. Coteaux du Layon is situated in the Anjou district of the region, along the river Layon, which is a tributary of the Loire. Six of the villages (communes), namely Beaulieu-sur-Layon, Faye-d'Anjou, Rablay-sur-Layon, Rochefort-sur-Loire, Saint-Aubin-de-Luigné and Saint-Lambert-du-Lattay are allowed to add their name to that of the appellation. Usually, the "de" or "sur" part is dropped, to give names like Coteaux du Layon Beaulieu and Coteaux du Layon Saint-Aubin. Furthermore, two villages within the Coteaux du Layon area form their own respective AOC – Bonnezeaux and Chaume. Finally, a favoured enclave within Chaume is a separate AOC under the name Quarts de Chaume. For the geographically delimited AOCs, required grape maturity is higher and allowed yield is lower. The best vineyards are generally located on the north bank of the Layon, where they enjoy a good sun exposure on roughly south-facing slopes. Coteaux du Layon including its enclave appellations cover about 1,400 hectares (3,500 acres) in the early 2000s.

The wines of Coteaux du Layon are all made from Chenin blanc, locally often called Pineau de la Loire. Often, the grapes are harvested when they are affected by noble rot, but can also be merely very ripe or have sun-dried on the vine, so-called passerillé grapes. While Coteaux du Layon wines are never dry, the level of sweetness varies. Simpler wines from the basic appellation could best be described as semi-sweet, while some producers – nicknamed "sugar hunters" – produce very sweet wines with an intense botrytis character similar to a Trockenbeerenauslese. Some, but not all of these very sweet wines are labelled Sélection de Grains Nobles. However, it has been claimed that since the late 1990s, fewer producers try to get the sweetness of their wines up to the very extreme levels sought by many "sugar hunters" during the 1990s.

== Chaume ==
The village of Chaume is situated in the western part of the Coteaux du Layon area in the commune of Rochefort-sur-Loire. The village of Chaume used to be one of the villages which could add its name to the appellation name, to be sold as Coteaux du Layon Chaume. The requirements for Chaume were slightly higher than for the other villages. In 2003, INAO elevated Chaume to its own AOC under the name Chaume Premier Cru des Coteaux du Layon. This choice of name was somewhat unusual for the region, since no other Loire appellation (in difference from for example Burgundy AOCs) bear the designation Premier Cru or Grand Cru as part of their AOC name. Therefore, the decision was protested by some other Loire producers, and in 2005 the Conseil d'État annulled INAO's rules for the new appellation, temporarily returning Chaume to its pre-2003 status. In 2007, the AOC was created anew, now under the shorter and less controversial name of Chaume and covering 130 hectares (320 acres). The vintages 2005 and 2006 were allowed to carry the new name. The must weight and residual sugar requirements for the new Chaume appellation were set higher than for Quarts de Chaume. However, Quarts de Chaume AOC producers still felt that the close association between their AOC's name and Chaume was causing damage to the value of their wines and continued to object to the AOC naming, and brought the new AOC to court as well, where it was annulled in May 2009, which would mean that the wine would be back to Coteaux du Layon status. In December 2009 it looked like the controversy would be resolved by the regional committee of INAO by Chaume being allowed to call itself Premier Cru, while Quarts de Chaume would be called Grand Cru.

== Quarts de Chaume and Bonnezeaux ==
Within the village of Chaume, a particularly favored enclave of just over 30 hectares (74 acres) is entitled to the name Quarts de Chaume, which means "the quarter of Chaume". It is situated with southernly exposure in an amphitheatre-like setting, with brown schist and carboniferous soils. Sources differ as to the explanation of the name, if it is derived from its status as the best quarter of Chaume, or if a quarter of the wine was collected by a landowner as payment in older times.

The AOC of Bonnezeaux is located in the eastern part of the Coteaux du Layon area, and has about 110 hectares (270 acres) of vineyards.

== Requirements ==
The legal requirements for the different AOCs are as follows.

AOC	Allowed base yield (hectoliter per hectare)	Minimum sugar content of the must (grams per liter)	Minimum alcohol content	Minimum residual sugar in the wine (grams per liter)	Other requirements
Coteaux du Layon	35 hl/ha	221 g/L	11%	34 g/L	
Coteaux du Layon + a village name	30 hl/ha	238 g/L	12%	34 g/L	
any of the above + the designation Sélection de grains nobles		294 g/L			No chaptalization allowed, must prove in a test that it has SGN character
Bonnezeaux	25 hl/ha	238 g/L	12%	34 g/L	Grapes must be overripe, and may be affected by noble rot or not
Chaume	25 hl/ha	272 g/L	12%	68 g/L	Grapes must be passerillé or affected by noble rot. If the must has a minimum sugar content of 323 g/L and no chaptalization is used, only 11% alcohol is required
Quarts de Chaume	25 hl/ha	238 g/L	12%	34 g/L	Grapes must be overripe, and may be affected by noble rot or not

== Other appellations ==
The subregion's generic Anjou appellation overlaps with the Coteaux du Layon area. Therefore, it is possible to downgrade Coteaux du Layon wine to dry or sweet Anjou blanc.

Coteaux de l’Aubance to the north of Coteaux du Layon produce wines of a similar style, but is a less notable appellation.

Vouvray is another Chenin blanc appellation which produces both sweet, dry and sparkling wines. It is situated further upriver along the Loire, in the Touraine subregion. In comparison to sweet Vouvray, Coteaux du Layon wines tend to be more full-bodied, often sweeter, and slightly lower in acidity.

== See also ==
- Sweetness of wine
- Anjou wine
