= La Possonnière =

- Commune
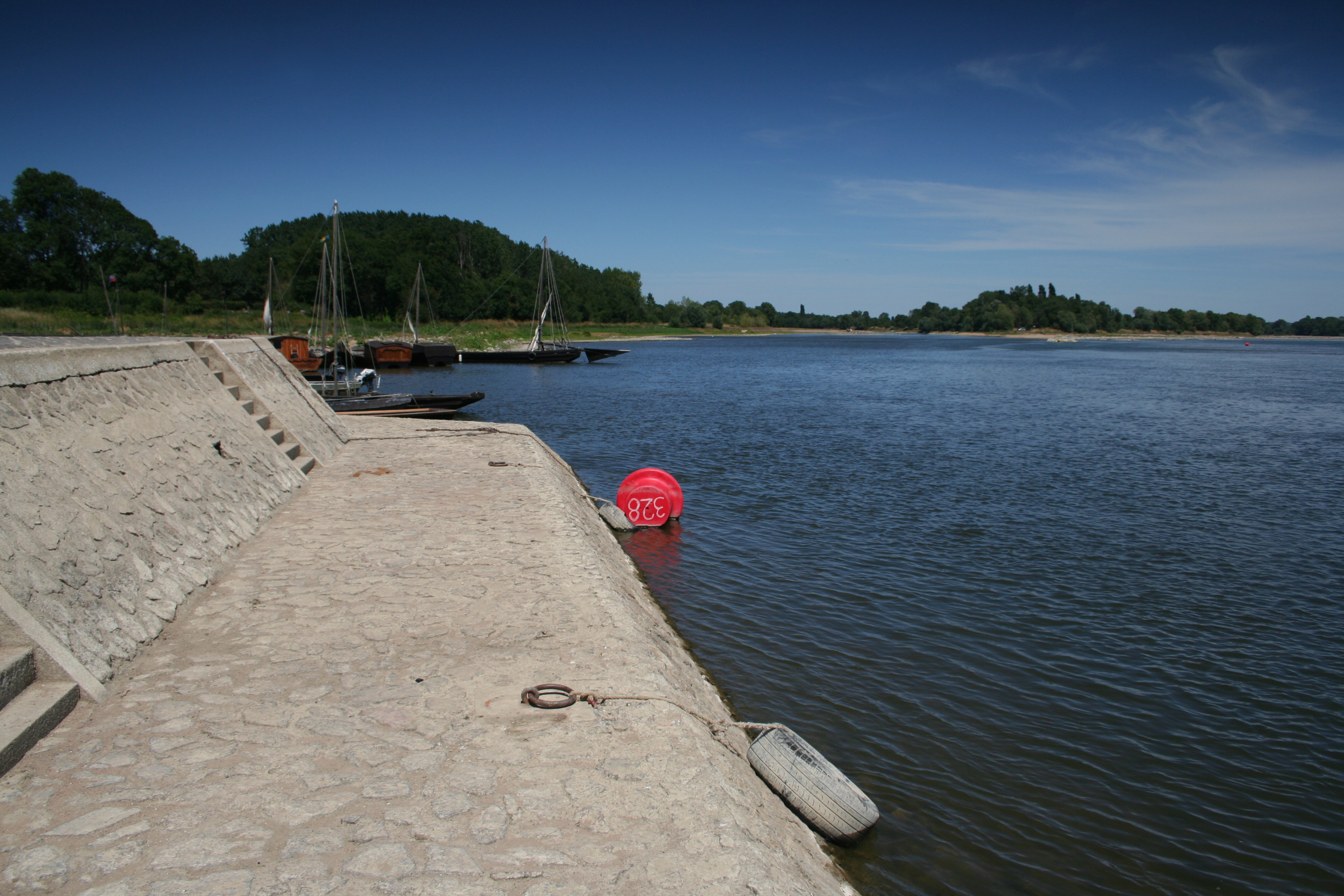
- The port of La Possonière
- Location of La Possonnière
- Location within France Location within Pays de la Loire
- Coordinates: 47°22′34″N 0°41′06″W
- Country: France
- Region: Pays de la Loire
- Department: Maine-et-Loire
- Arrondissement: Angers
- Canton: Chalonnes-sur-Loire
- Intercommunality: Loire Layon Aubance

Government
  - Mayor (2020–2026): Jacques Genevois
- Area^{1}: 18.36 km^{2} (7.09 sq mi)
- Elevation: 24 m (79 ft)
- Highest elevation: 67 m (220 ft)
- Lowest elevation: 12 m (39 ft)
- Population (2023): 2,501
  - Density: 136.2/km^{2} (352.8/sq mi)
- Demonym(s): Possonnéen, Possonnéenne
- Time zone: UTC+01:00 (CET)
  - Summer (DST): UTC+02:00 (CEST)
- INSEE/Postal code: 49247 /49170
- ^{1} French Land Register data, which excludes lakes, ponds, glaciers > 1 km^{2} (0.386 sq mi or 247 acres) and river estuaries.

La Possonnière (French pronunciation: [la pɔsɔnjɛʁ]) is a commune in the Maine-et-Loire department in western France.

== Population ==
Historical population
Year	Pop.	±% p.a.
1968	1,516	—
1975	1,519	+0.03%
1982	1,844	+2.81%
1990	1,962	+0.78%
1999	2,128	+0.91%
2007	2,310	+1.03%
2012	2,391	+0.69%
2017	2,437	+0.38%
2023	2,501	+0.43%
Source: INSEE

== See also ==
- Communes of the Maine-et-Loire department
