= Clos de la Coulée de Serrant =

Clos de la Coulée de Serrant (French pronunciation: [klo də la kule də seʁɑ̃]) is a French wine AOC and monopole. The winemaker is Nicolas Joly, who is a strong proponent of biodynamic wine. The vineyards are on the north bank of the Loire River near the town of Savennières and cover 7 hectares. The wines made are white and the AOC is exclusively planted with the Chenin Blanc grape variety. The total annual production is between 20-25 thousand bottles. Nicolas Joly also produces two other wines at his winery that have the Savennières and Savennières Roche aux Moines AOCs.

Wine has been produced at this vineyard since first planted in 1130 by Cistercian Monks. Coulée de Serrant is regarded as one of the best dry white wines in France. It is among the very few single-owner French winery properties to be granted its own AOC; others include Romanée-Conti, La Tâche AOC, and Château-Grillet AOC.

== Bibliography ==
- Nicolas Joly (2005) Wine from Sky to Earth: Growing & Appreciating Biodynamic Wine, Acres U.S.A. ISBN 0911311602
- Nicolas Joly (2008), Biodynamic Wine Demystified, Board and Bench Publishing ISBN 1934259020
