= Nicolas Joly =

French winegrower

Nicolas Joly (born 1945) is a French winegrower in the Loire wine region, and one of the pioneers and leading personalities of the biodynamic wine movement.

== Early life and education ==
Joly studied at Columbia University and subsequently worked for J.P. Morgan in New York City as an investment banker. He was later posted to London, but left banking in 1977 to take over his family's wine estate, Château de la Roche aux Moines in Savennières.

== Wine career ==
At the time he took over the family estate, Joly was sceptical about modern agriculture and the effect it had on nature. He encountered a book on biodynamic farming and took an active interest in the ideas found there, and from 1980 started to experiment with them in his wine estate. From 1981, the estate's top wine Clos de la Coulée de Serrant has been made biodynamically, and from 1984 the estate's entire range has been produced biodynamically. Coulée de Serrant is among the very few single vineyards monopole to be granted its own Appellation d'Origine Contrôlée; others include Romanée-Conti, La Tâche, and Château-Grillet.

Joly has later written extensively on biodynamic wine production, and has served as an inspiration to many other wine producers who have converted to biodynamic practices.

His biodynamic convictions also means that Joly disapproves of the label "winemaker" to the extent that his business card is reported to read "Nicolas Joly, Gérant de la Société, Nature assistant and not a winemaker".

== Château de la Roche aux Moines ==
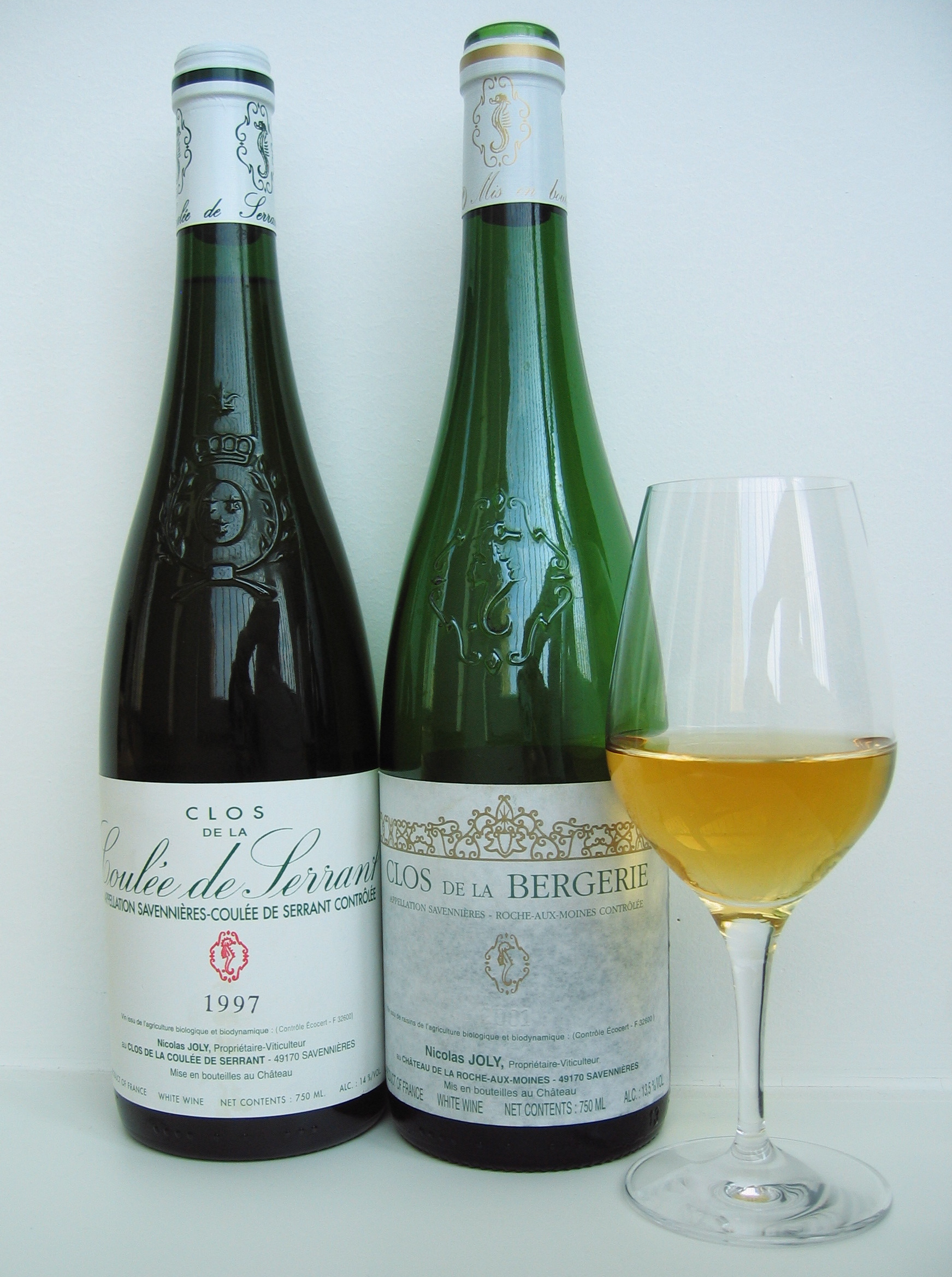
Two of Nicolas Joly's wines. On the left, Clos de la Coulée de Serrant and on the right Clos de la Bergerie.

Nicolas Joly and his Château de la Roche aux Moines hold all 7 hectares (17 acres) of Savennières most celebrated enclave, Coulée de Serrant, which is an Appellation d'origine contrôlée of its own, Savennières-Coulée-de-Serrant. Joly's wine from this appellation is labelled Clos de la Coulée de Serrant and is often mentioned as one of the world's best dry white wines.

The range of wines consists of:

- Clos de la Coulée de Serrant, from the appellation Savennières-Coulée-de-Serrant
  - In some vintages, a moelleux (sweet) version of Clos de la Coulée de Serrant is also produced.
- Clos de la Bergerie, from the appellation Savennières-Roche-aux-Moines
- Les Vieux Clos, from the appellation Savennières. This wine is labelled Les Clos Sacrés when it is exported to the United States.

In recent years, Nicolas Joly's daughter, Virginie Joly, has taken over much of the task of running the estate.

== Books ==
Nicolas Joly's writings on biodynamic wines consist of books directed at winegrowers and wine consumers, respectively. His book for winegrowers is called Le Vin du ciel à la terre and has been through several editions. In its English adaptation for the North American market, it was given the title Wine From Sky To Earth. His book for wine consumers is called Le Vin, la Vigne et la Biodynamie and was adapted as What is Biodynamic wine ? in its 2007 UK edition and as Biodynamic Wine Demystified in its 2008 US edition. His books have also been published in Czech, German, Hungarian, Italian, Japanese, Portuguese and Spanish.
