= Biodynamic wine =

Wines made employing biodynamic methods

Biodynamic wines are wines made employing the pseudo-scientific methods called biodynamic agriculture both to grow the fruit and during the post-harvest processing. Biodynamic wine production uses organic farming methods (e.g., employing compost as fertilizer and avoiding most pesticides) while also employing soil supplements prepared according to Rudolf Steiner's formulas, following a planting calendar that depends upon astrological configurations, and treating the earth as "a living and receptive organism."

== Biodynamic viticulture ==
Biodynamic methods are used in viticulture (grape growing) in a variety of countries, including France, Switzerland, Italy, Spain, Austria, Germany, Australia, Argentina, Chile, Peru, South Africa, Canada, and the United States. In 2013, over 700 vineyards worldwide comprising more than 10,000 ha/24,710 acres were certified biodynamic. A number of very high-end, high-profile commercial growers have converted recently to biodynamic practices. According to an article in Fortune, many of the top estates in France, "including Domaine Leroy in Burgundy, Château de la Roche-aux-Moines in the Loire, Maison Chapoutier in the Rhone Valley, and Domaine Zind-Humbrecht in Alsace," follow biodynamic viticulture. For a wine to be labeled “biodynamic” it has to meet standards laid down by the Demeter Association, an internationally recognized certifying body.

Biodynamic agriculture is a form of alternative agriculture based on pseudo-scientific and esoteric concepts developed by Rudolf Steiner (1861–1925), who gave Agriculture Course in 1924, predating most of the organic movement. It includes ecological principles, emphasizing spiritual and mystical perspectives. Biodynamics aims at the ecological self-sufficiency of farms as cohesive, interconnected living systems.

== Efficacy ==
Some grape growers who have adopted biodynamic methods claim to have achieved improvements in the health of their vineyards, specifically in the areas of biodiversity, soil fertility, crop nutrition, and pest, weed, and disease management. For example, the late Anne-Claude Leflaive of Domaine Leflaive estate in Burgundy claimed that the use of biodynamic methods saved a badly diseased vineyard, to the point that it now produces some of her most highly prized wines. A long-term study of one California winery found that improved quality for both biodynamic and organic could not be explained. At a commercial vineyard in Ukiah, California, this study compared biodynamic and general organic farming across different blocks and found no differences in soil quality, yield per vine, clusters per vine, or cluster and berry weight. However, one of the authors, Leo McCloskey has made the case that consumer quality scores, 100-point scores, are expected to be higher for both biodynamic and organic over traditional farming.

Biodynamic grapes claim to have noted stronger, clearer, more vibrant tastes, as well as wines that remain drinkable longer. Biodynamic wines are more "floral", according to Spanish biodynamic vintner Pérez Palacios. Biodynamic producers also claim that their methods tend to result in better balance in growth, where the sugar production in the grapes coincides with physiological ripeness, resulting in a wine with the correct balance of flavor and alcohol content, even with changing climate conditions.

Fortune conducted a blind tasting of 10 biodynamic and conventional wine pairs judged by seven experts, including a Master of Wine and head sommeliers; nine biodynamic wines were rated superior. The biodynamic wines "were found to have better expressions of terroir, the way in which a wine can represent its specific place of origin in its aroma, flavor, and texture." Critics caution that such comparisons of wines of the same type need to be controlled for differences in soil and subsoil, and the farming and processing techniques used.

Critics acknowledge the high quality of biodynamic wines, but question whether many of the improvements in vineyard health and wine taste would have happened anyway if organic farming were used, without the mysticism and increased effort involved in biodynamics. Emidio Pepe, despite being considered one of the leaders of biodynamic winemaking, only utilized organic farming and traditional winemaking methods. Other critics attribute the success of biodynamic viticulture to the winemakers' higher craftsmanship and meticulous attention to detail. Ray Isle, managing editor of Wine & Spirit magazine, says, "So what if they also think burying cow horns full of manure will help them channel new life forces from the cosmos?"

== See also ==
- Chiara Condello
- Nicolas Joly
- Lalou Bize-Leroy
- Arianna Occhipinti
- Pascal Marchand
- Natural wine
- Organic wine

== Bibliography ==
- Nicolas Joly (2005) Wine from Sky to Earth: Growing & Appreciating Biodynamic Wine, Acres U.S.A. ISBN 0911311602
- Nicolas Joly (2008), Biodynamic Wine Demystified, Board and Bench Publishing ISBN 1934259020
- Per and Britt Karlsson (2014) Biodynamic, Organic and Natural Winemaking: Sustainable Viticulture and Viniculture Floris Books ISBN 1782501134
- Isabelle Legeron (2017), Natural Wine: An introduction to organic and biodynamic wines made naturally, CICO Books, ISBN 1782494839
