= Domaine du Closel – Château des Vaults =

Winery and vineyard in Savennières, Loire Valley, France

Domaine du Closel – Château des Vaults is a family-run organic winery and vineyard located in Savennières, in the Anjou region of the Loire Valley, France. Situated on the north bank of the river Loire, approximately 18 kilometres southwest of Angers, it is one of the largest and oldest estates in the Savennières appellation, producing wine continuously since 1495. The domaine is notable for its historical connection to Emmanuel de Las Cases, official biographer of Napoleon Bonaparte, whose descendants owned and shaped the estate throughout the 19th and 20th centuries.

== History ==
=== Origins and early history ===
The seigneury of Les Vaults is first documented in 1495, when the site already comprised a vineyard, garden and kitchen garden. The name Château des Vaults dates to the Middle Ages: in old French, vault referred to a valley, and the name thus evokes the small valleys in which the château and its vineyards are nestled. During the 16th and 17th centuries, the property belonged to vassals of the lords of the châtellenie de Serrant, before passing through the hands of bourgeois families from Angers and eventually to Antoine Walsh, Count of Serrant, a Nantes shipowner of Irish descent.

In 1850, the estate was acquired by François Claude Fourmon Démazière, a Parisian banker, who rebuilt and enlarged the 16th–17th century manor and laid out a landscaped park along the river Boar. His only daughter Louise bequeathed the property to the closest friend of her husband — the Marquis de Las Cases — for his daughter Marque de Las Cases, who would later become Madame du Closel.

=== The Las Cases connection ===
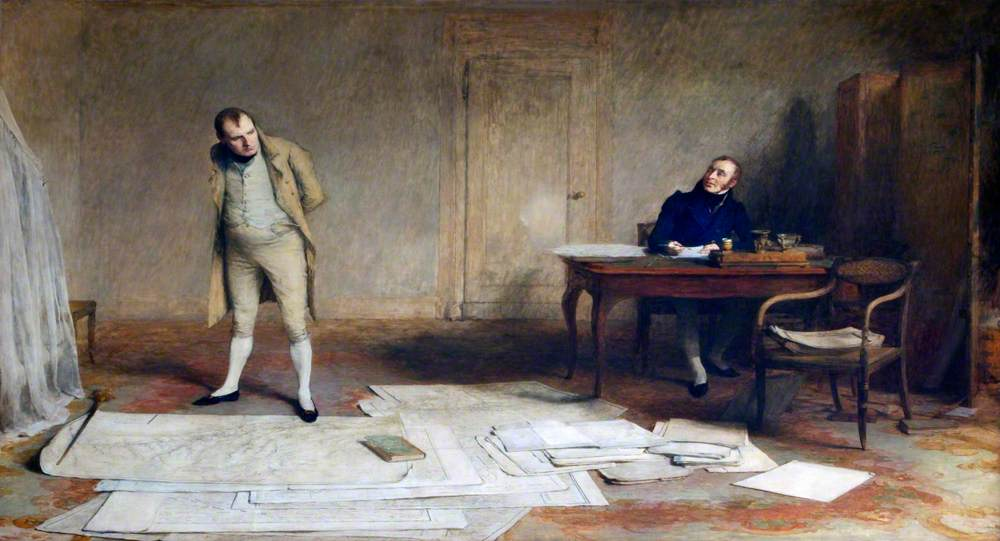
Napoléon & Emmanuel de Las Cases, author of the Mémorial de Sainte-Hélène and ancestor of the current owners of Domaine du Closel

The domaine's most celebrated historical association is with Emmanuel de Las Cases (1766–1842), naval officer, cartographer and author of the Mémorial de Sainte-Hélène. Las Cases accompanied Napoleon Bonaparte into exile on the island of Saint Helena, recording the emperor's memoirs in what became one of the most widely read historical documents of the 19th century, selling millions of copies across Europe and beyond. His descendants inherited the estate in the early 20th century, when Marque de Las Cases — a direct descendant of the emperor's biographer — took ownership of the Château des Vaults and its 16 hectares of vines.

=== Bernard du Closel and the Savennières appellation ===
Marque de Las Cases married Bernard du Closel, who served as Mayor of Savennières from 1916 to 1956. Bernard du Closel was a pivotal figure in the history of Loire Valley wine: he played a central role in establishing the Savennières appellation d'origine contrôlée in 1952, one of the earliest and most prestigious dry white wine appellations in France. The name Domaine du Closel was subsequently added to the estate's name in his honour.

As Marque de Las Cases and Bernard du Closel had no children, they transferred the estate to their niece, Michèle de Jessey, who developed the vineyard and established the company Les Vins Domaine du Closel. In 2001, Michèle de Jessey retired and her daughter, Evelyne de Pontbriand — formerly a teacher of French literature around the world — took over the management and winemaking responsibilities.

=== Organic and biodynamic conversion ===
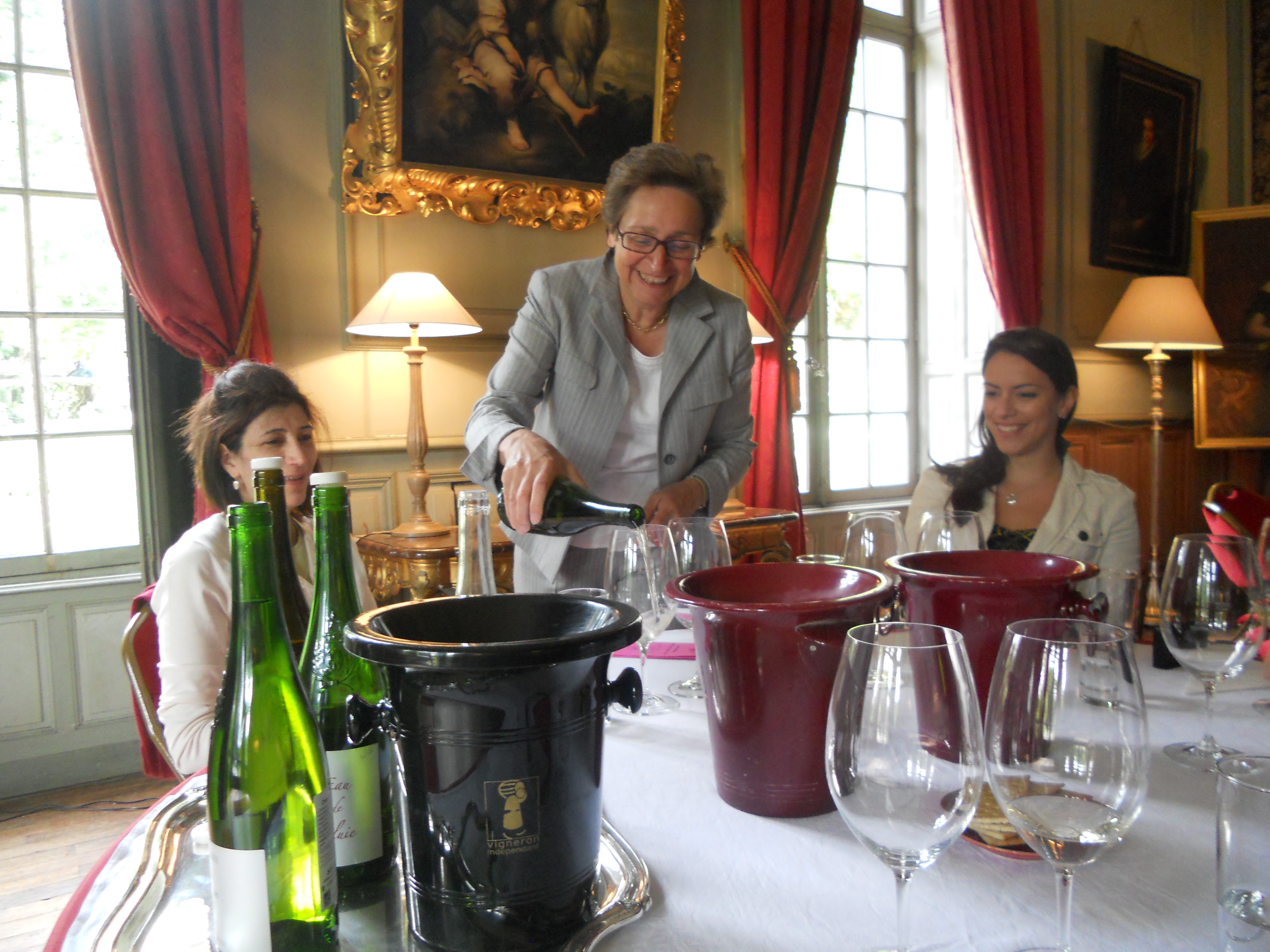
Evelyne de Pontbriand, owner and winemaker at Domaine du Closel, Savennières

Under Evelyne de Pontbriand, the estate progressively converted to organic farming, later achieving biodynamic certification from both Demeter and Biodyvin in 2015. The conversion reflected a broader philosophy of returning to the expression of terroir, with minimal intervention in both vineyard and cellar. Following the death of Evelyne de Pontbriand in 2024, Domaine du Closel was purchased by winemaker Ivan Massonnat of Domaine de Beauséjour and Belargus in 2026.

== Viticulture and winemaking ==
The vineyard extends across approximately 15 hectares on slopes perpendicular to the Loire, with an exceptional south-western exposure. The soils are notably diverse, combining schist slopes, sandstone and schist plateaux, and parcels of volcanic rock, quartz and aeolian deposits — a mosaic that contributes to the complexity of the wines.

As required by the Savennières appellation, Chenin Blanc is the sole permitted white grape variety. Grapes are harvested by hand in two passes to ensure optimal ripeness. Wines are aged on their lees in barrel for 11 to 18 months depending on the vintage.

== Wines ==
The domaine produces wines across several appellations, all from Chenin Blanc except where noted:

- Clos du Papillon — the flagship Savennières, from a 3-hectare parcel on rhyolite, schist and quartz soils
- La Jalousie — Savennières from schist slopes
- Les Caillardières — Savennières from sandstone and schist plateau
- Belle Dame — dry white Savennières
- Une Émotion — Anjou Rouge from Cabernet Franc
- Demoiselle aux yeux d'or — sparkling wine

== Wine tourism ==
The estate is open to visitors for tastings and guided tours of the vineyard and cellars. The château's park and gardens are listed with the Parcs et Jardins network. The estate is also accessible by bicycle from the Loire à Vélo cycle route.
