= Bicentenary of the death of Napoleon =

Napoleon I memorial

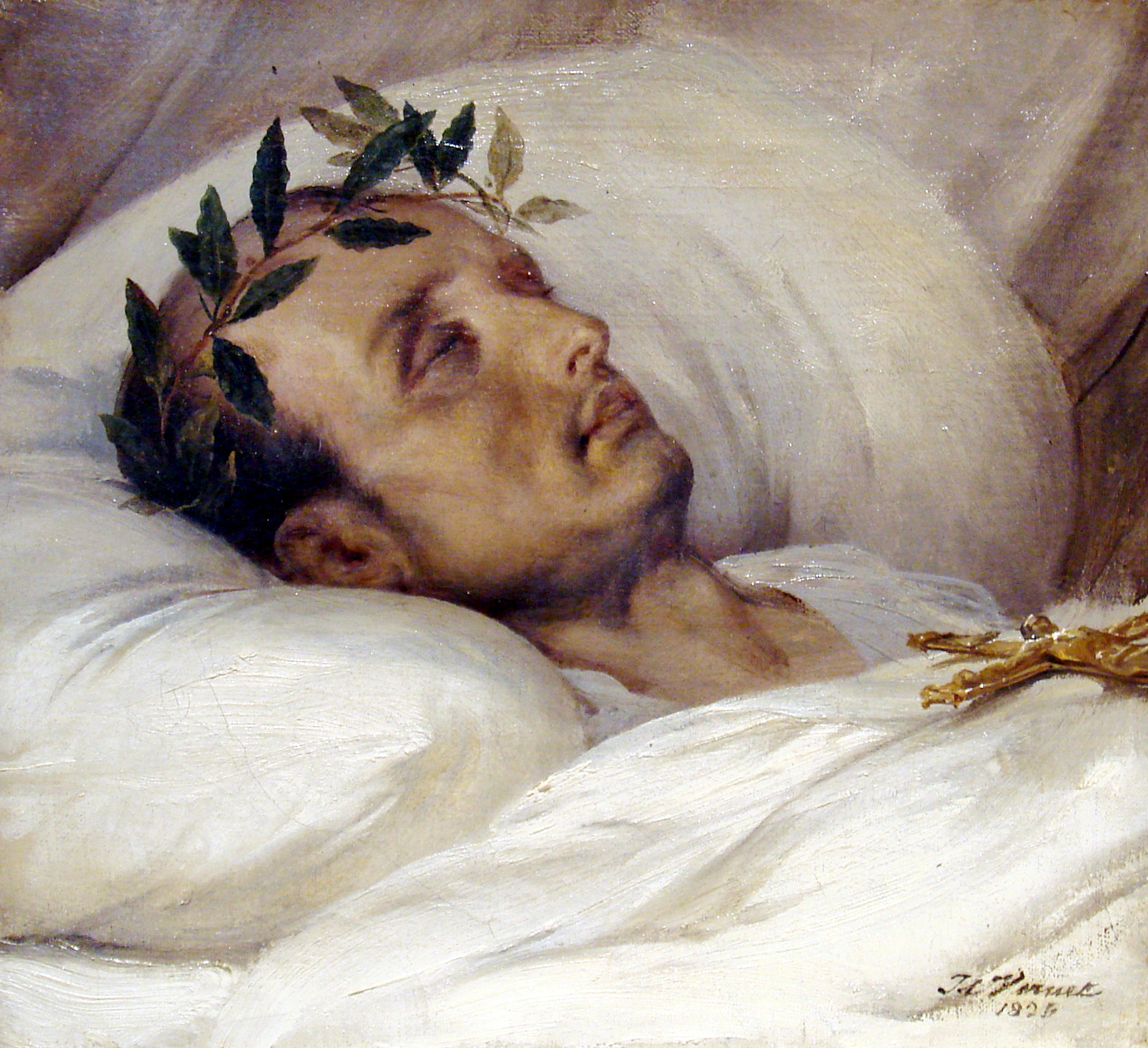
- Napoleon on his deathbed (by Horace Vernet).
- Time: 5 May 2021
- Location: France: Institut de France, Palace of Fontainebleau, Les Invalides, Grande halle de la Villette, and Maison Bonaparte; Belgium: Waterloo 1815 Memorial, and Liège-Guillemins railway station; United Kingdom: Trajan's Market; Italy: Saint Helena; and Switzerland: Arenenberg

The bicentenary of the death of Napoleon corresponds to the two-hundredth anniversary of 5 May 1821, the date of his death. To mark the occasion, commemorative ceremonies and events (such as exhibitions and conferences) were organized around the world, including in France and Belgium in 2021. However, due to the COVID-19 pandemic, a number of events were adapted or postponed to a later date. The bicentenary had also been the subject of much debate in France concerning the organization of commemorations and Napoleon's legacy.

== Official ceremonies ==
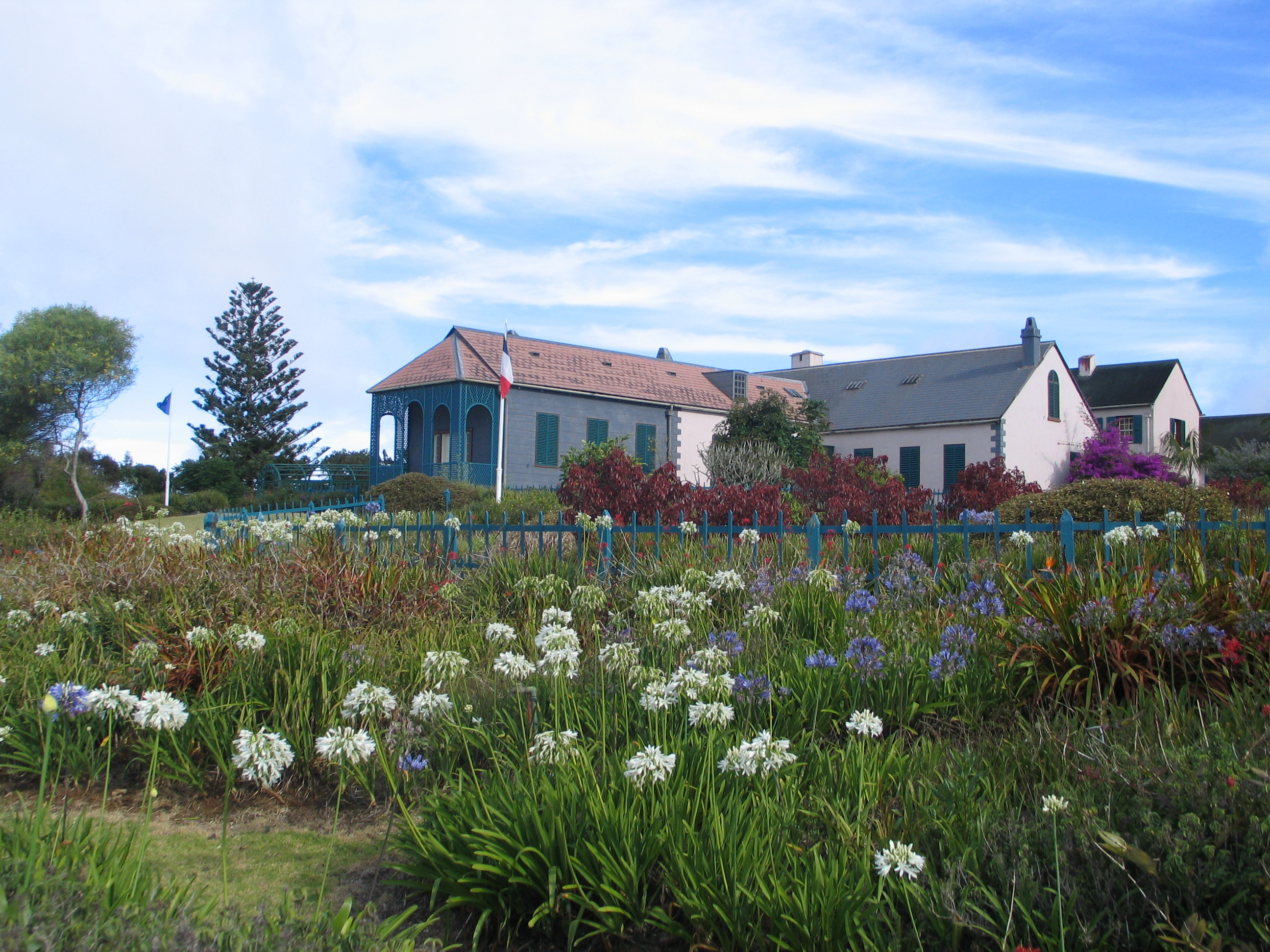
Longwood House in January 2008.

On 10 March, government spokesman Gabriel Attal confirmed that French president Emmanuel Macron had decided to commemorate Napoleon personally. However, due to the COVID-19 pandemic, the French authorities kept the bicentenary commemorations to a minimum.

On the afternoon of 5 May, Emmanuel Macron went to the Institut de France to take part in a ceremony with academics and high-school students, and to give a speech. Several other personalities, including historian Jean Tulard, also spoke at the event. The French President then laid a wreath at the foot of the Emperor's tomb under the dome of the Invalides, accompanied by Prince Jean-Christophe Napoléon.

Local initiatives in France complemented the government ceremonies. On 4 May, the Souvenir Napoléonien laid a wreath at the foot of the Emperor's statue in Cherbourg.

On 5 May, the elected representatives of Val-de-la-Haye in Normandy also laid a wreath in front of the Napoleon column, in the presence of the Prefect of Normandy and Seine-Maritime. Indeed, in 1840, Val-de-la-Haye was the site of the last transfer of the Emperor's coffin to a steamer, which later sailed up the Seine to Paris.

Various ceremonies were also held on the island of St. Helena, where Napoleon died. On 5 May, a ceremony was held at Longwood House. On 6 May, a mass was held in the emperor's chapel. Finally, on 9 May, the emperor was laid to rest. These events were broadcast live on the Internet.

== Events in mainland France ==
Dozens of events were organized throughout France, including exhibitions, symposia, publications, events, and ceremonies.

This was particularly the case in member towns of the "Villes impériales" label, such as Fontainebleau and Rueil-Malmaison, which have made their Napoleonic identity a driving force in terms of cultural influence.

=== Exhibitions ===
To mark the bicentenary, a host of exhibitions were scheduled throughout France, highlighting Napoleon's legacy in the arts, business, politics and science.

==== Grande halle de la Villette ====
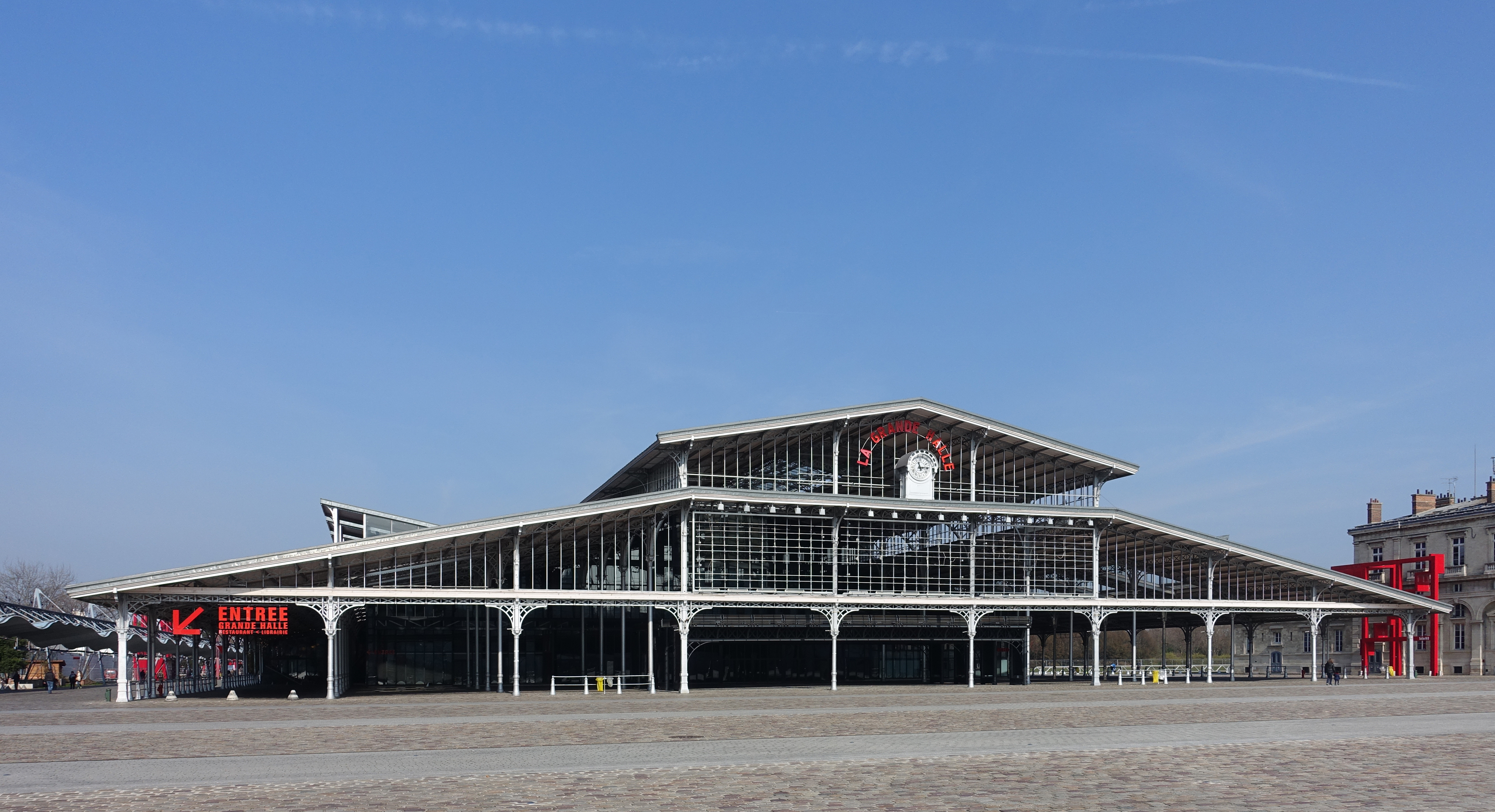
A major exhibition on Napoleon was held at the Grande halle de la Villette in Paris in 2021.

The most important of these was the "Napoleon" exhibition at the Grande halle de la Villette in Paris. Conceived as a "biopic" on the emperor, it aimed to do as well as the Tutankhamun, the Pharaoh's Treasure exhibition, which welcomed 1.4 million visitors in 2019.

"The idea is to link Napoleon to the period before and after, so that the public can re-read their own French history in a different way. Particularly with regard to Europe. Napoleon isn't an eclipse in the sky, he's part of the solar system", explained Arthur Chevallier, one of the exhibition's scientific curators.

For the occasion, over 150 paintings, sculptures and various objects were loaned by Napoleonic funds (the Fondation Napoléon, as well as the châteaux of Versailles, Fontainebleau, Malmaison and the Musée de l'Armée). To bring the exhibition to life, the tour was enhanced by multimedia features such as "sound showers", where visitors could hear Josephine's love letters or music from David's coronation of Napoleon, or battle scenes, where figures and maps came to life.

Nonetheless, the exhibition's staging remained uncertain for a long time, with some of La Villette's overseas employees threatening to exercise their right of withdrawal, despite the existence of a chapter on slavery. According to the newspaper Le Parisien, the exhibition's organizers called on the "Fondation pour la mémoire de l'esclavage" to "give guarantees to those who see the exhibition in a negative light".

"The idea of this chronological exhibition is to present a Napoleon for dummies that gives a balanced vision of Napoleon, not just a hagiographic one" explained the exhibition's chief curator Bernard Chevalier. The exhibition opened to the public from 28 May to 19 December 2021.

==== Musée de l'Armée ====
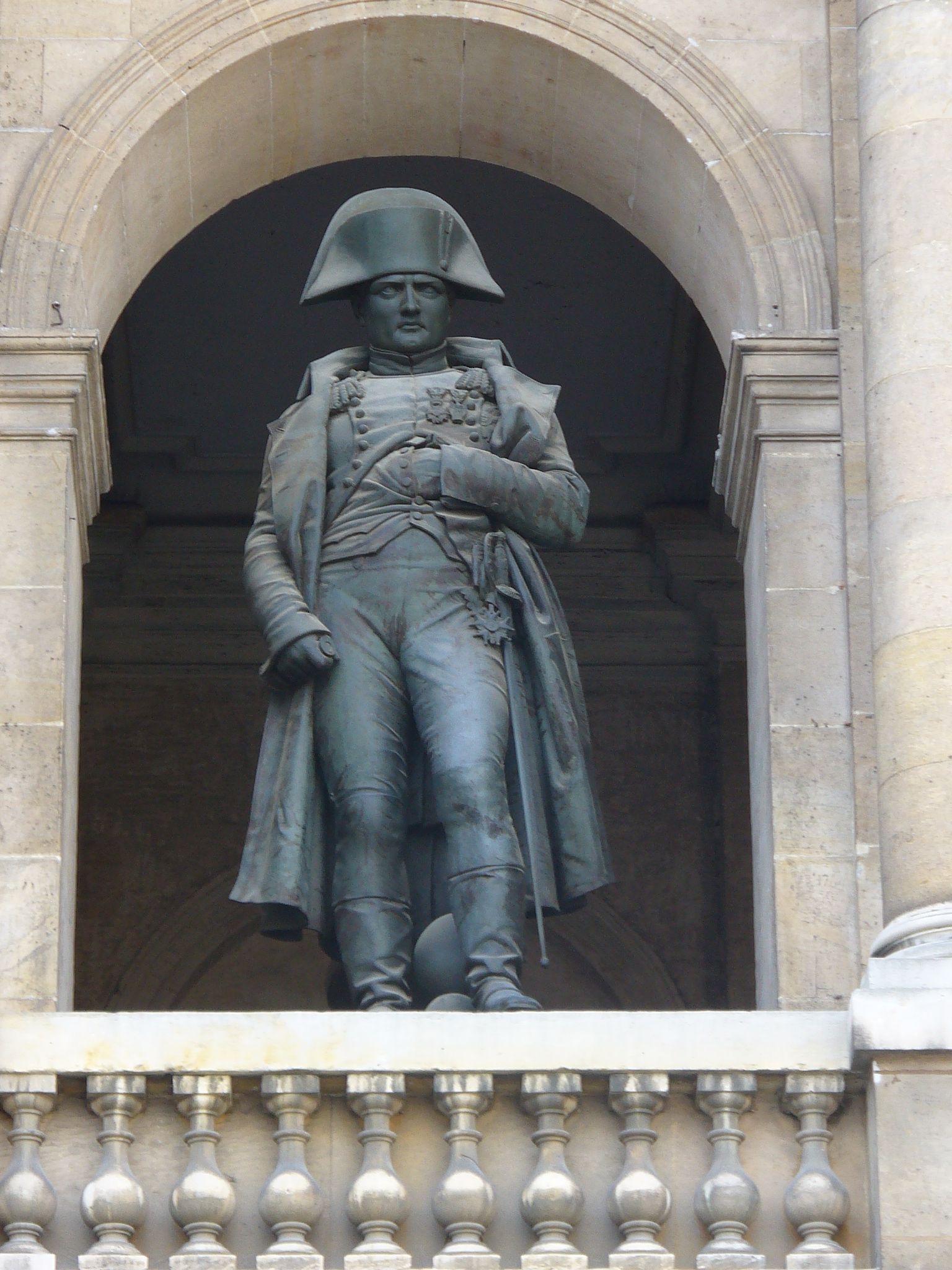
An exhibition on Napoleon's death was organized at the Musée de l'Armée.

Also in Paris, the Musée de l'Armée, located in the Hôtel des Invalides, organized an exhibition entitled "Napoléon n'est plus". Produced in partnership with the Fondation Napoléon, the exhibition revisited the major issues surrounding Napoleon's death, drawing on various scientific disciplines (archaeology, medicine, and chemistry). It also presented the public with Napoleon's original will, preserved in the Archives nationales. Originally planned for 31 March, the opening of the exhibition was postponed to 19 May, due to the health crisis. Prior to the official opening to the public, the museum organized a virtual inauguration of its exhibition on 30 March, hosted by influencer Scribe Accroupi, to showcase the exhibition's key works.

"Our subject is how and why, through his death, Napoleon's image evolved considerably, and it was in death that he became who he is today", explained Emilie Robbe, Chief Curator of Heritage at the Musée de l'Armée.

The Musée de l'Armée, as part of its "Napoléon? Encore!" contemporary art program, also commissioned Pascal Convert to create a work for the dome of the Invalides. Entitled "Memento Marengo" it consisted of a three-dimensional copy of the skeleton of Napoleon's favorite horse, suspended above the Emperor's tomb. As the artist explained, "Napoleon's favourite horse, Marengo, [was] captured by Wellington's troops at Waterloo on June 18, 1815 and taken to England on his death, as a prize of war, like a sacred relic, it was reduced to its skeleton and exhibited at the National Army Museum, where it can still be seen".

The installation of the work in this location provoked controversy, notably on the part of historian Thierry Lentz. Several historians pointed out that the dome was a necropolis, not an exhibition space, while others expressed their dismay at its macabre symbolism. Thought to be presented there on a temporary basis, it was withdrawn on 13 February 2022, along with those of the 29 other artists invited for the same event.

==== Other Parisian exhibitions ====
To celebrate the bicentenary, Chaumet, the official jeweler of Napoleon's first wife Joséphine de Beauharnais, organized an original exhibition at its hotel at 12 place Vendôme in Paris, starting 10 May 2021. Called "Joséphine & Napoléon, une histoire (extra)ordinaire", the exhibition brought together more than 150 pieces (jewelry creations, paintings, objets d'art, letters, and graphic documents) from Chaumet's heritage, as well as from private collections and various cultural institutions.

Other exhibitions were also organized from September 2021 onwards. These included the "Les Palais disparus de Napoléon Ier" exhibition at the Manufacture des Gobelins, which recreated former imperial residences (the Tuileries, Saint-Cloud and Meudon palaces) using digital reconstructions.

The "Sur les pas de Napoléon Ier" exhibition at the Musée de la Monnaie de Paris presented the evolution of French coinage, the symbolism of the Imperial Eagle and their role in Napoleonic propaganda.

==== Outside Paris ====
From 16 April 2021, the town of Saint-Germain-en-Laye presented a virtual exhibition entitled "Napoléon, chef de guerre, chef d'État" retracing Napoléon's destiny as First Consul and then Emperor, with a particular focus on his role alongside his soldiers on the battlefield.

In Lavaur, in the Tarn department, an exhibition on Marshal Jean-de-Dieu Soult was scheduled for May 2021, but was subject to changing sanitary conditions.

In Châteauroux, an exhibition entitled "Napoléon et Bertrand, le retour des héros" was scheduled to start in June 2021, which coincided with the centenary of the Musée Bertrand.

At the Sainte-Mère-Église media library, an exhibition on the Emperor's battles was scheduled to open in May 2021.

In Fontainebleau, an exhibition entitled "Un palais pour l'Empereur. Napoleon at Fontainebleau" presented the château as Napoleon and Joséphine designed it, with more than 200 works from Fontainebleau collections and French and foreign museums.

Finally, in Nice, the "Napoléon, héros de la littérature" exhibition focused on the Napoleonic myth in the works of writers such as Balzac and Stendhal.

=== Conferences and symposia ===
While waiting for the museums to reopen, some institutions were adapting to offer a cultural program around the bicentenary.

The Château de Fontainebleau, for example, organized a videoconference open to the public on 8 April 2021, hosted by the château's general curator, Christophe Beyeler. The conference, entitled "Napoléon Ier, un personnage à revisiter et un musée à reconstruire" presented the museographic work carried out as part of the bicentenary to revamp and enrich the museum's historical works.

On 19 April 2021, the Bibliothèque nationale de France also organized a virtual conference on the ten collections of "Dessins pour l'ouvrage de la commission d'Égypte" which bore witness to the Egyptian campaign and the participation of scholars in it.

A conference was held also to be organized later that year by the municipality of Cherbourg, the town that had welcomed Napoleon's ashes in 1840. The town's deputy for culture and heritage, Catherine Gentile, explained:

We're planning a conference on the legacy of Napoleon I in the city, with the participation of specialists on the French emperor. It will focus on the institutional framework conditioned under his reign, which has left its mark on the city.

Lastly, a number of symposia were scheduled for later 2021. These included “Les Savants en Égypte et la campagne militaire” organized by the Musée archéologique de Saint-Raphaël in October 2021, and “Les guerres napoléoniennes dans l'Histoire: de 1815 à nos jours, historiographie et apports à l'histoire de la guerre” at the Musée de l'Armée in November 2021.

=== Other events ===
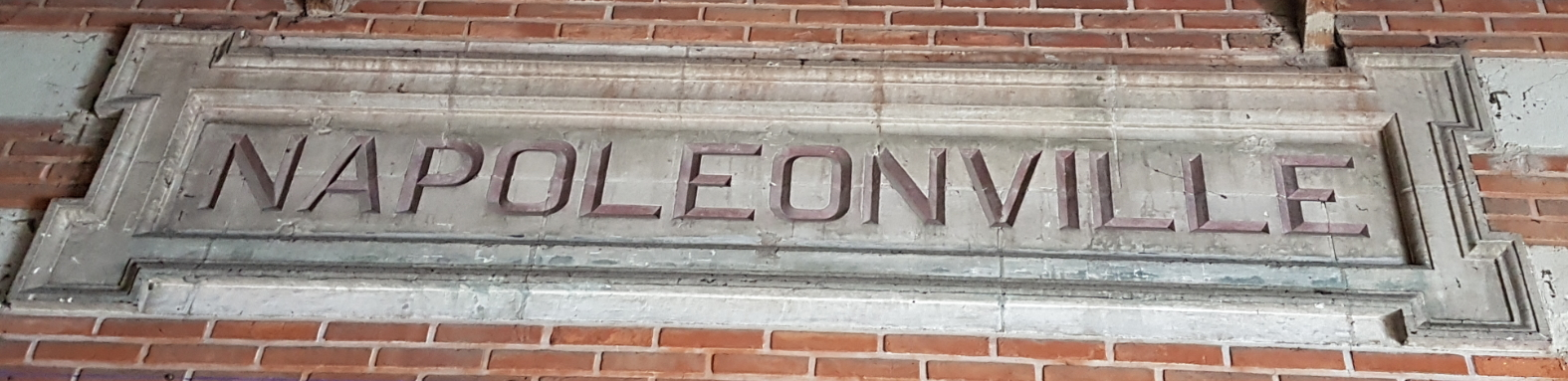
"NAPOLEONVILLE" inscription on the north gable of the Pontivy SNCF train station.

In Paris, a parade featuring a military platoon in Napoleonic dress, with 500 participants in period costumes, was planned along the Champs Elysées, from the Arc de Triomphe to Les Invalides. Originally scheduled for May 2021, it was postponed due to health restrictions.

In Châteauroux, a major imperial weekend, including colloquia and re-enactments of bivouacs and battles, was scheduled for 2 and 3 October 2021.

In Châtillon-sur-Seine, a major show and concert were scheduled for 14 August 2021 in the town hall square, with the participation of actor Francis Huster.

In Lavaur, the birthplace of Las Cases, a weekend of events focusing on the Napoleonic Empire was scheduled for 22 and 23 May 2021. The event included a bivouac, parades, pistol duels, training and exercises on horses, dance demonstrations, lectures and a craftsmen's market.

In Marseille, the Maison de la Corse and the Société Napoléonienne de Marseille organized a mass commemorating the death of Napoléon Bonaparte at the Abbaye Saint-Victor in Marseille on 5 May 2021.

In Montauban, a statue of Napoleon was to be erected in the allée de l'Empereur, as a tribute to his role in the creation of the department.

In Pontivy, a town where Napoleon left an important cultural and architectural legacy, the Tourist Office was working on two bicentennial projects. The first was the construction of a family bike trail along a section of the Napoleonic canal from Nantes to Brest, between Napoleonville (Pontivy's former name) and Rohan, focusing on local history and the links between Napoleon and Europe. The second project was a temporary photographic exhibition on the premises of the Pontivy Tourist Office, to show the similarities in design and buildings between the only two towns created by Napoleon: Pontivy and La Roche-sur-Yon.

In La Roche-sur-Yon, a number of events were also planned for November 2021 around the statue of Napoleon and the theater, sanitary conditions permitting. In particular, a giant portrait of Napoleon, created in 1853 by copyist painter Clémence Dimier, was presented to the public in November 2021 on the occasion of a day dedicated to the bicentenary of the emperor's death.

Finally, a number of events were planned for 2021 in the Seine-et-Marne department, health conditions permitting. The department had already been awarded the 2021 Année Napoléon label by the Fondation Napoléon.

"In spite of Covid, gatherings are possible in compliance with health regulations, and I have no doubt that local initiatives will flourish here and there" said Prince Joachim Murat.

The Festival Napoléon, created by baritone and producer David Serero, launched its first edition in Paris, at the Cinema Club de l'Étoile, offering screenings of Napoleonic films, lectures, readings, concerts and a prize-giving ceremony, in partnership with the Administration of Paris.

== Events in Corsica ==
In Corsica, the island where Napoleon was born, numerous events were planned for the bicentenary of his death.

However, the COVID-19 pandemic forced local authorities and museums to adapt their cultural offerings to the event.

=== A cycle of virtual conferences on Napoleon ===
From 6 April to 18 May, the Corsican Assembly decided to organize a series of 7 virtual conferences led by specialists on Napoleon and Corsica. The lectures, organized in partnership with the Corsican delegation of the Souvenir napoléonien, were broadcast every Tuesday on the Assembly's website.

A second cycle of six virtual conferences was planned for September and October 2021.

=== Festivities adapted or postponed in Ajaccio ===
In Ajaccio, Napoleon's birthplace, numerous commemorations (exhibitions, concerts, film evenings) were planned to mark the bicentenary of his death, and to recall the Corsican roots of this historic figure. "It's his island, his childhood, his roots. All of this inevitably contributed to forging his destiny, which, despite its darker sides, remains exceptional. [...] Not to commemorate his death would be to ignore history" explained Christophe Mondoloni, deputy mayor in charge of festivities.

However, following health restrictions linked to the COVID-19 pandemic, the Ajaccio municipality decided to postpone part of the festivities to mark the bicentenary of Napoleon's death.

The festivities on 5 May, the anniversary of Napoleon's death, were cut back on most of the planned events, including the re-enactment in period costume of the return of his ashes to the island.

The grand concert, scheduled to take place at the cathedral, was postponed until the next summer. A mini-concert was nevertheless held on 5 May, but in a reduced configuration of ten musicians. It was broadcast on the city's social networks.

The commemorative mass organized by the Comité Central Bonapartiste (CCB) at the Chapelle Impériale remained closed, with a capacity limited to 30 people.

Other planned events were postponed to later dates. These included the "Napoleonic" culinary competition originally scheduled for early April, the lecture series scheduled for early May, and the live illumination of the Imperial Crown.

"The next presidential address will make it possible to set new dates for this postponement", said Ajaccio town hall in a press release dated 20 April.

Despite the diversity of the festivities, the planned program did not convince everyone among the local councillors. "It lacks ambition, we should have gone a bit further. We should be reaping more benefits from the Napoleon brand, including from a tourism and economic point of view", explained the mayor of Bonifacio.

=== Exhibitions and other events in Corsica ===
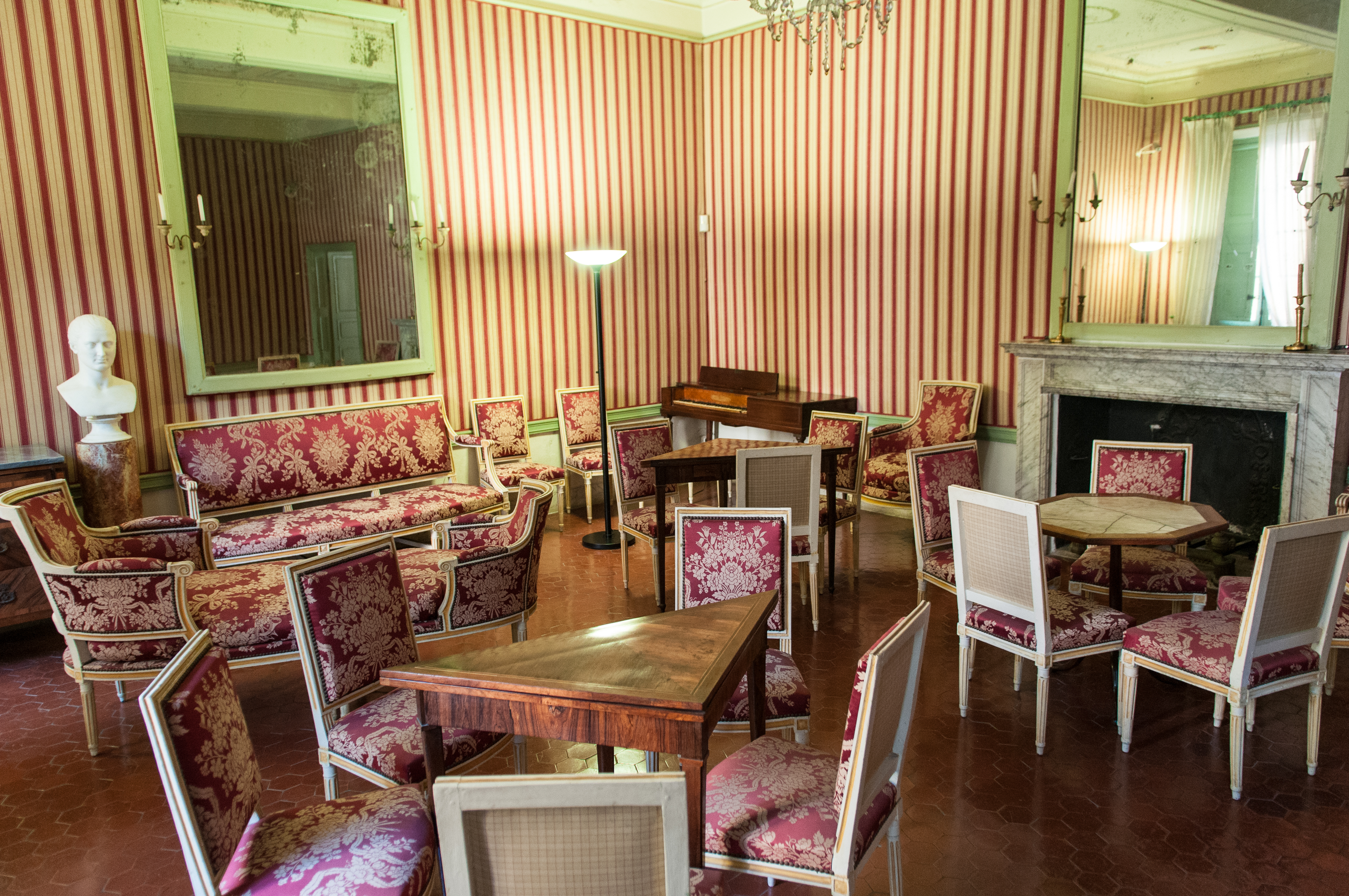
An exhibition was planned at the Maison Bonaparte museum in 2021.

At the Maison Bonaparte museum in Ajaccio, an exhibition entitled "Dans le marbre et dans l'airain", dedicated to statuary from the Bonaparte era, was originally scheduled to open on 10 April, but was postponed due to the health crisis. "In any case, the catalog will be ready, and will be available to researchers and enthusiasts of Napoleonic history" said Jean-Marc Olivesi, curator of the Maison Bonaparte. A catalog was available in bookshops and on the Maison Bonaparte website.

Another exhibition, entitled "Les Bonaparte et l'Antique, un langage impérial", took place in the same museum from 25 September 2021 to 10 January 2022. This featured several hundred works and engraved plates from the bequests of Cardinal Fesch, Napoleon's uncle. In addition, photographs were exhibited around Ajaccio throughout July and August, showcasing the major films that have paid tribute to the Emperor. A preview of Ridley Scott's film Kitbag, about Napoleon's youth, was also shown.

Representations of Napoleon in cinema were also featured in the exhibition "Napoléon au temps du cinéma muet, les débuts du 7e art" at the Musée Fesch, from 30 June to 4 October.

At the Diamant crossroads, a brand-new crown was installed to replace the old one, which had been removed for restoration. "The 2021 version of the crown will be even more faithful to that of Napoleon's coronation. Thanks to cutting-edge techniques, the exact curve of the crown has been reconstituted. The 2021 model will be slightly more voluminous to better adapt to the size of the crossroads. More than 10,000 LED light points will enable the crown to produce superb sparkling effects", explained the city's technical services.

Finally, the imperial chapel, home to the Bonaparte necropolis and the resting place of Napoleon's parents, was exceptionally open for guided tours in mid-October.

Health conditions permitting, conferences, stamp exhibitions, Napoleonic evenings and literary encounters completed the commemorations.

A virtual exhibition entitled "Dans les pas de Napoléon botaniste" was prepared. Organized in partnership with Ajaccio's Fesch and Tommaso Prelà de Basti libraries, the exhibition focused on Napoleon's interest and scientific curiosity in botany. It was part of a project to dematerialize the Fesch library's heritage collections.

== Events outside France ==
=== Events in Belgium ===
Various exhibitions were being organized in Belgium to mark the bicentenary of Napoleon's death.

The largest Belgian bicentenary exhibition was planned at the Gare de Liège-Guillemins from 3 April 2021 to 9 January 2022, entitled "Napoléon, au-delà du mythe". "This exhibition, which is part of the bicentenary of his death, retraces the major stages that have shaped the legend of Napoleon" explained Guy Lemaire, who helped design the exhibition.

On that occasion, various items evoking Napoleon's military life, as well as his private life, were presented to the public. In all, 350 authentic pieces from private collections and Belgian and foreign institutions were on display. "There are 350 authentic pieces: we have Josephine's dress, Napoleon's outfits, his bathtub, which comes from Liège, a campaign tent where he slept and where you can see his bed." explained exhibition curator René Schyns. A bivouac was also reconstituted with the participation of a scenographer of historical battle reconstructions.

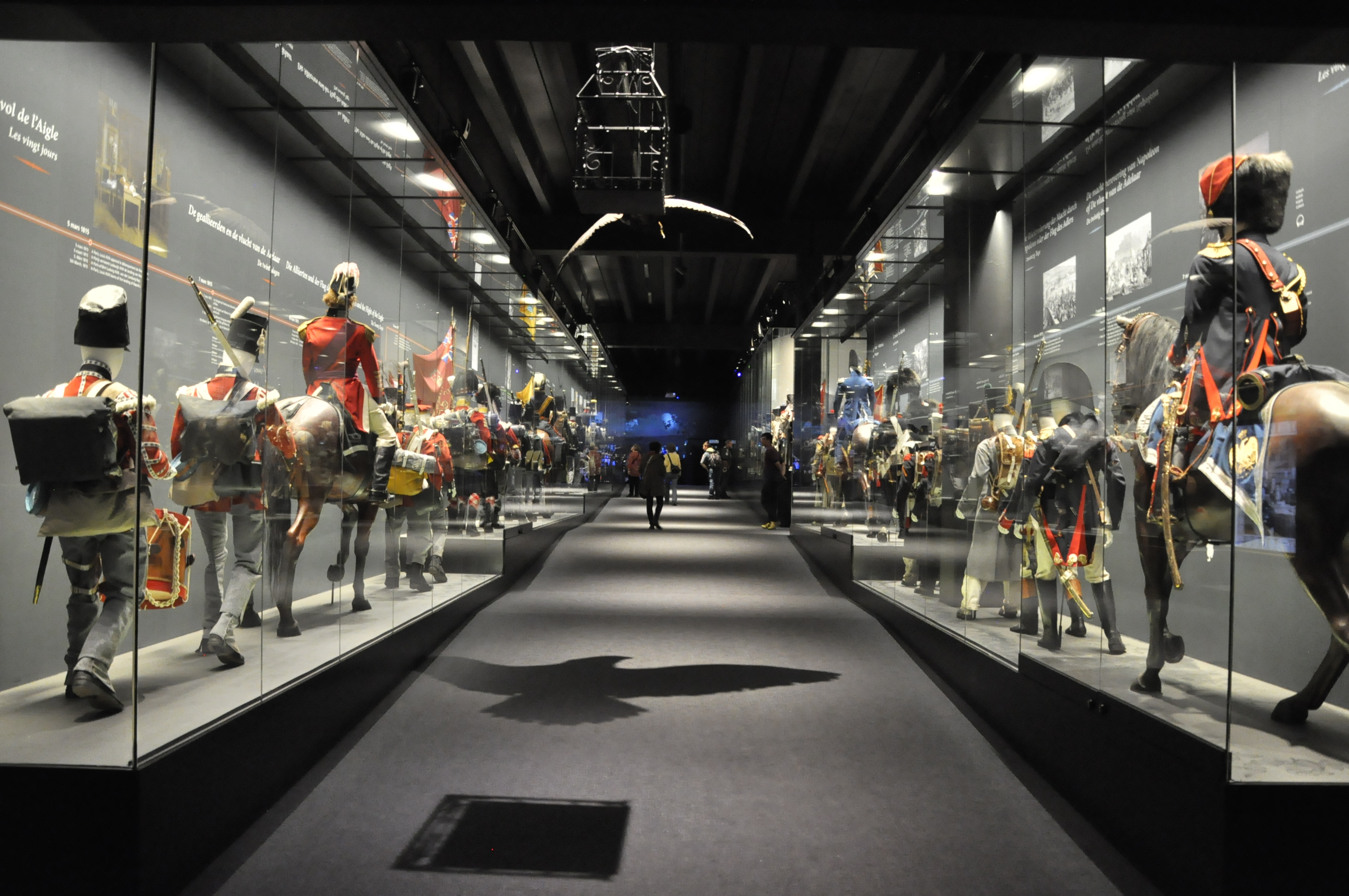
Dioramas with French and Allied troops at the Battle of Waterloo Memorial.

The Mémorial de la Bataille de Waterloo was also hosting an exhibition entitled "Napoléon: de Waterloo à Sainte-Hélène, la naissance de la légende", from 5 May to 17 October 2021. Accompanied by a series of conferences and round tables, the exhibition focused on the last years of the emperor's life, from 1815 to 1821. On that occasion, some one hundred original items that once belonged to Napoleon were presented to the public (a bicorn, an observation telescope, as well as paintings, crockery, books and everyday objects).

More original, the exhibition "L'Empire en Playmobil" organized from 8 May by the Wellington Museum in Waterloo, offered a way of reliving the moments in Napoleon's life, thanks to scale models.

A few days later, on 9 May, the Ferme des Castors in Aiseau-Presles hosted a weekend of exhibitions and conferences on the history of the Belgians during the Napoleonic period. Books, works, figurines and uniforms were on display. Re-enactors took part in the event and presented their equipment, while respecting sanitary conditions.

Finally, a major cavalry competition was held on the weekend of 15 August, to mark the anniversary of Napoleon's birth.

=== Events in Italy ===
In Rome, an exhibition was planned in the archaeological area of the Markets of Trajan, excavated by the Napoleonic government between 1811 and 1814. The exhibition described Napoleon's links with the ancient world.

"The French entered Rome in 1809 and almost immediately set about enhancing the Trajan column, whose pedestal was buried in a foul-smelling ditch", recalled Claudio Parisi Presicce, Director of Rome's Archaeological Museums.

=== Events in Switzerland ===
In Switzerland, the Arenenberg Museum opened a special exhibition on Napoleon's last years on St. Helena from 10 May to 24 October 2021. For the occasion, a copy of Napoleon's tomb on St. Helena was presented to visitors.

=== Events on St. Helena ===
Despite the health crisis, the island of St. Helena took advantage of the bicentenary to boost its appeal to tourists, as soon as conditions allowed.

"The commemoration of the bicentenary of Napoleon's death is a wonderful opportunity to promote the island" confirmed German Amaya of Compagnie Ponant, which offered Napoleon Cruises, cruises with a stopover on St. Helena.

Dawn Cranswick, head of the island's economic development agency, confirmed that the memory of Napoleon remained St. Helena's major attraction. For the bicentenary of his death, a thousand visitors were expected to visit the island, including over 400 cruise passengers.

In anticipation of the possible return of travel to the island, local associations were trying to find alternatives for enthusiasts wishing to commemorate the bicentenary. The Saint Helena Napoleonic Heritage, for example, the foundation responsible for preserving the estates of Saint Helena, set up an Internet service enabling individuals to place a miniature wreath with their name on Napoleon's tomb, which was his first place of burial before his body was repatriated to France in 1840.

== Cinema ==
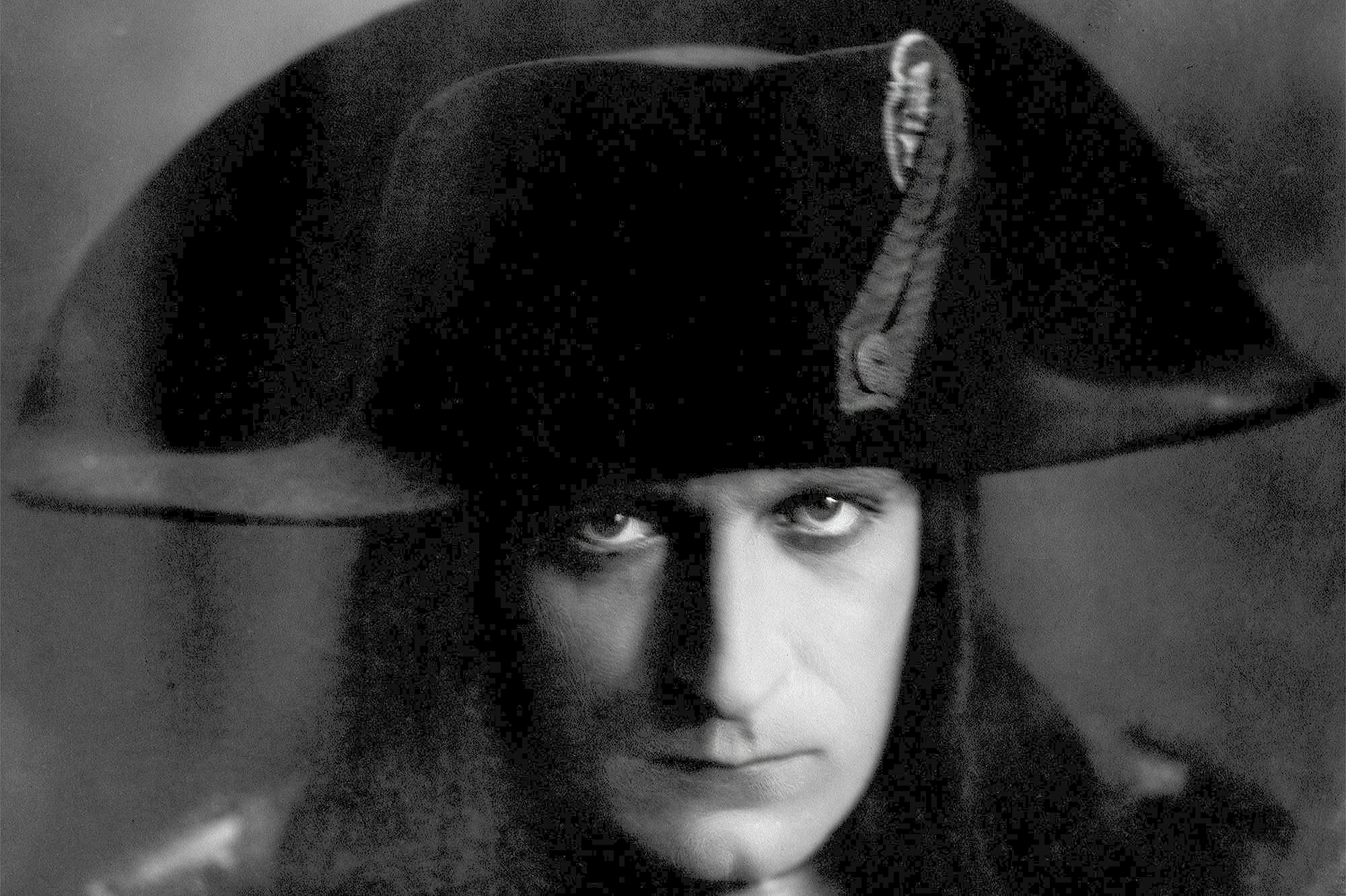
Albert Dieudonné as Napoléon I in Abel Gance's film Napoléon

On 14 January 2021, American online video giant Netflix announced that, as a patron of the arts and in partnership with the Cinémathèque française, it was contributing to the restoration of Abel Gance's film Napoléon, first shown in 1927. The ambition was to reconstitute the most accomplished version, as close as possible to the original 1927 work, based on the legendary "Apollo" version.

This was "both a restoration and, above all, the reconstitution of a lost work", after "thousands of hours of research and analysis of missing film elements found in the four corners of the globe" said Cinémathèque communications director Jean-Christophe Mikhaïloff.

The amounts allocated by Netflix to this project were not published, but in a joint press release, the two institutions announced that Netflix intended to demonstrate its support for "the preservation and promotion of French and international cinematographic heritage, and to encourage its transmission".

Completion of the restoration was scheduled for the end of 2021, to mark the bicentenary of the Emperor's death.

== Television ==
=== On French television ===
From March 2021, "Napoleonic" programming, including various programs and documentaries, was offered on major French television channels. This was particularly true of France Télévisions group channels.

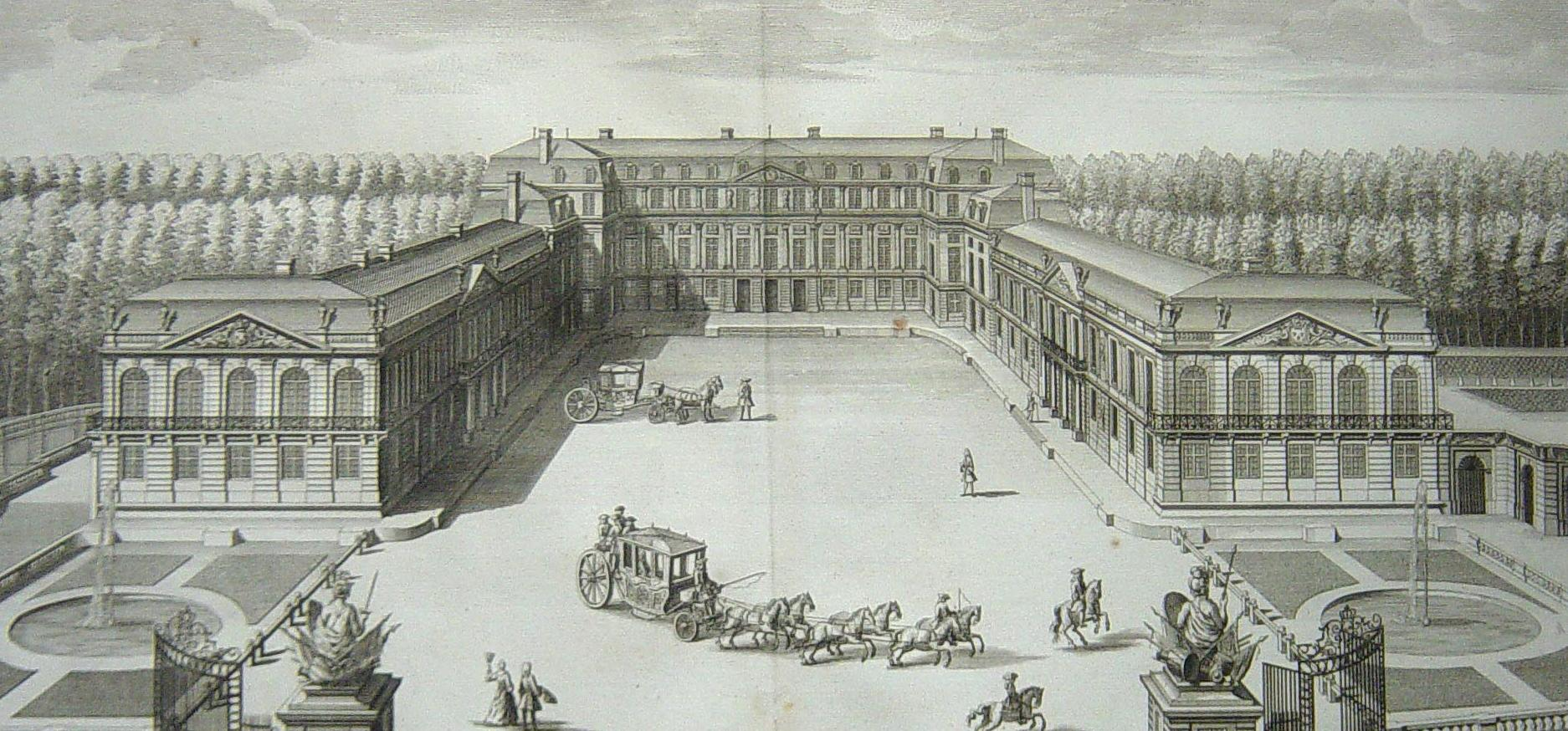
For the program Laissez-vous guider, sur les pas de Napoléon, the Château de Saint-Cloud was reconstructed in 3D.

On 24 March, the literary program La Grande Librairie devoted a special program to Napoleon, entitled Le bicentenaire de la mort de Napoléon Bonaparte. Five historians specializing in the subject were invited to discuss the meaning of the commemorations and Napoleon's legacy.

On 13 April, the program Laissez-vous guider on France 2 dedicated a documentary to Napoleon, entitled Laissez-vous guider, sur les pas de Napoléon. It reconstructed a number of places emblematic of Napoleon's epic, which had disappeared: the Hôtel Chantereine, the Château de Saint-Cloud, the Chinese Baths and, finally, the ship Bellerophon on which Napoleon surrendered to the English in July 1815.

On the same day, a report entitled Dans les secrets de l'exposition Napoléon was broadcast on the same channel, giving viewers an insight into the exhibition at the Grande Halle de la Villette.

On 19 April, France 3's Secrets d'Histoire also devoted a special program to Napoleon, l'exilé de Sainte-Hélène. The documentary looked back at his exile on the island of St. Helena after his defeat at Waterloo, and how he used his final years to transcribe his memoirs, thus forging his legend.

On 23 April, a previously unseen documentary entitled Napoléon: l'influenceur was broadcast as part of the program Le Doc Stupéfiant on France 5. It showed Napoleon's relationship with artists, and how he used them to construct the narrative of his conquests and glory.

On 1 May, the Arte channel broadcast a film entitled Napoléon, la destinée et la mort. Using animated reconstructions, the film painted a psychological portrait of the figure, while retracing certain key moments in his life. A week later, on 8 May, another documentary, entitled Napoléon – Metternich: le commencement de la fin, was broadcast on the same channel.

Finally, in May 2021, the general-interest history channel Histoire TV offered special programming to mark the bicentenary of Napoleon's death, with almost ten hours of documentaries and magazines. As a highlight, on 5 May, the channel offered various programs, including a BBC documentary series and an issue of the magazine C'est un complot, which deciphered the theses asserting that Napoleon was assassinated.

Other programs were expected to follow in the course of that year, as evidenced by the filming in April 2021 at La Roche-sur-Yon of a report on Napoleon that was broadcast on the 8 pm news on TF1. The France 3 Corse ViaStella channel was also rolling out a comprehensive offering (history, cinema, and debates) around the bicentenary.

=== On Italian television ===
In Italy, the bicentenary of Napoleon's death was the occasion for several programs.

The Rai Storia channel decided to broadcast a special program dedicated to the emperor's stay on the island of Elba. The program presented the various places where Napoleon lived, including the Palazzina dei Mulini and the Villa Napoleonica, the two residences he occupied in Portoferraio.

Other programs dedicated to Napoleon were also planned for 2021.

== Music ==
Napoleon took an early interest in music, and soon became an admirer of the Italian soprano Girolamo Crescentini and the Italian opera singer Giuseppina Grassini, who officially became the Emperor's first singer.

In April 2021, to commemorate the bicentenary of his death, the Opéra royal du château de Versailles was chosen to revive a selection of opera arias in which these two great voices triumphed at the beginning of the 19th century, such as Niccolò Zingarelli's Giulietta e Romeo.

Meanwhile, artistic director Arnaud Marzorati, soprano Sabine Devieilhe and the ensemble Les Lunaisiens composed a new musical program, entitled "Sainte-Hélène, la légende napoléonienne", to highlight in music each milestone in the imperial story.

== Literature ==
The year 2021 saw the publication of some one hundred books dedicated to Napoleon and his era.

These included two works by historian and director of the Fondation Napoléon Thierry Lentz:

- Napoléon, Dictionnaire Historique, a historical dictionary thematically covering all aspects of the Napoleonic period.
- and Pour Napoléon, a book in which the author attempts to respond to the various accusations levelled at Napoleon.

According to the author, this second book was a "response to all those who would like to erase the Napoleonic heritage, by looking at it with a contemporary eye".

The director of the Musée Fesch in Ajaccio also dedicated a book to Napoleon, Les Goûts de Napoléon, which deals with Napoleon's public and intimate life.

Finally, it should be mentioned that the graphic novel Moi, Napoléon, the first in a series devoted to historical figures, which evoked the major episodes of his life in 25 dates, or the comic book Il était une fois Napoléon, were published in November, by cartoonist Michel Ciccada.

== Publications in the press ==
As part of the bicentenary celebrations, a number of reviews devoted to the emperor were published in the French press.

The newspaper Le Point published a special issue entitled "Napoléon – La grande aventure", a historical and geographical survey of some 50 Napoleonic sites in France and Europe.

Symbolizing Napoleon's enduring fascination, Paris Match magazine also published a special issue entitled "La folie Napoléon", featuring a hundred pages of exclusive photos and reports dedicated to the Emperor.

Le Figaro Magazine also dedicated a special issue to him, entitled "Napoléon, L'épopée – le mythe – le procès", which deciphered the myth and focused on the two major exhibitions planned in Paris for the bicentenary (at the Musée de l'Armée and the Grande Halle de la Villette).

Finally, the magazine Histoire & Civilisations devoted an issue to him entitled "Napoléon – l'ombre et la lumière", in reference to the emperor's complex legacy. The magazine attempted to establish a distanced assessment of the Napoleonic chapter.

== Other tributes ==
In France, La Poste issued two "special bicentenary" stamps and a souvenir sheet featuring Napoleon to commemorate the bicentenary of his death. The stamps and sheets were available from selected post offices, by subscription or by mail order from 19 April 2021.

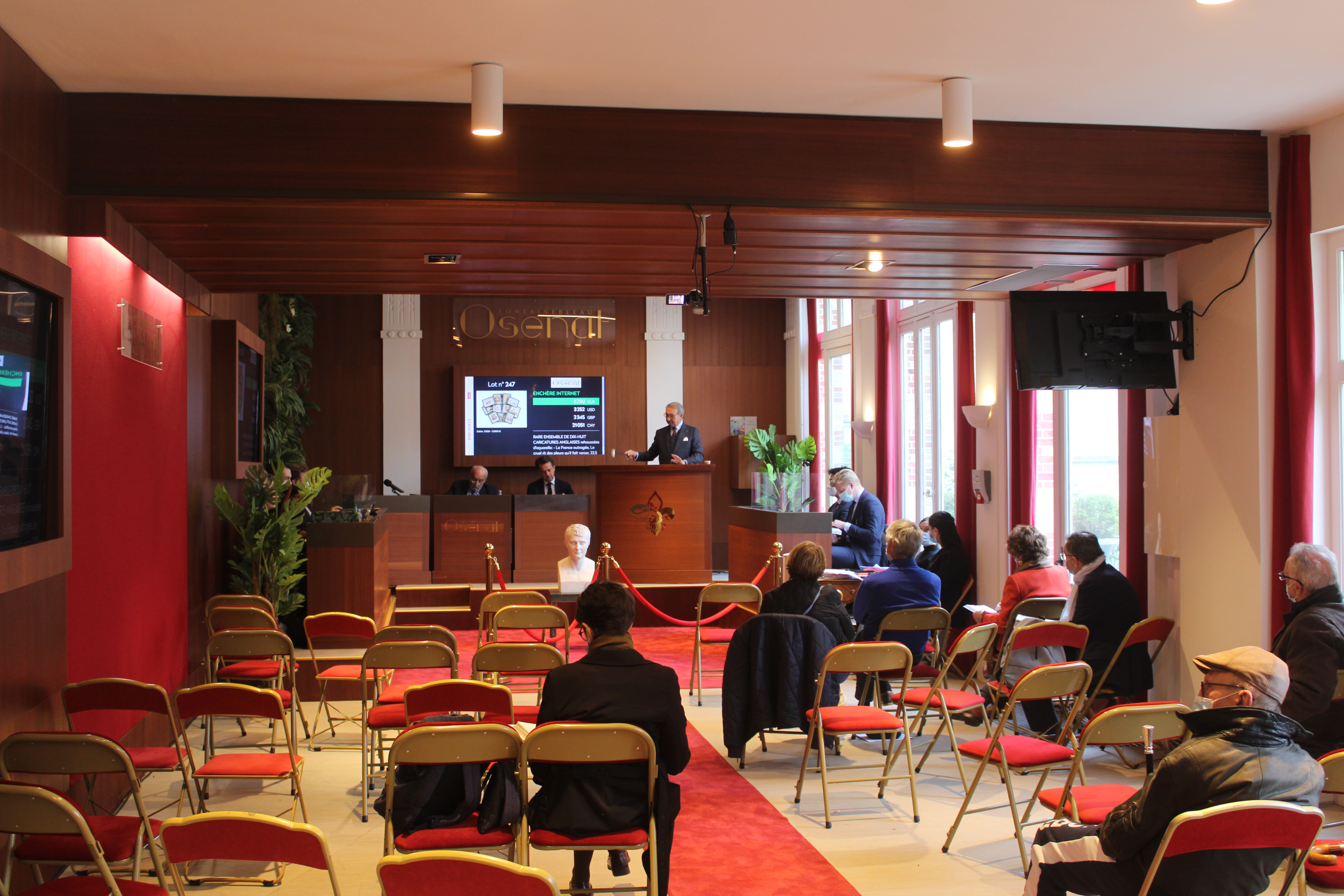
The Bicentenary sale, the Empire in Fontainebleau, organized by Osenat in Fontainebleau.

For its part, the Monnaie de Paris minted several limited-edition collector coins in silver and gold, in the emperor's image.

An auction was held in Fontainebleau on 5 and 6 May to mark the bicentenary of Napoleon's death. Coins, medals, paintings, sculptures, furniture and even hair, plates and shirts that once belonged to Napoleon were up for sale. "There's a passion for the Emperor that goes beyond what's reasonable. Some people are prepared to spend a lot of money to have the Emperor's shirt or the stockings he wore at such and such a time. It's certainly a fetish. [...] At the same time, after Jesus Christ and the Beatles, Napoleon is the most famous person in the world" explained auctioneer Jean-Pierre Osenat.

In Longwy, the enamel factory commissioned the production of 200 collector's eggs bearing the emperor's effigy, as well as the usual attributes of the empire, such as the "N" and the bee. "This doesn't mean we agree with everything he did, or with the dark times he may have brought to France. But our company is linked to this character who shaped France" explained factory president Martin Pietri.

In Italy, a national committee for the bicentenary of Napoleon's death was specially created. The Italian Ministry of Economic Development also included a stamp bearing the effigy of Napoleon in its official program, which was available from 5 May. In an article in the magazine L'Echo de la timbrologie, Italian author Danilo Bogoni reminded that Napoleon "made the post office a democratic tool, accessible to all [...] and extended its network throughout the conquered territory". He also pointed out that Italy owed Napoleon "the introduction of postage paid, the extension of registered mail and the introduction of franking".

On the Internet, a "souvenir ticket" bearing the effigy of the first French emperor was offered for sale on various sites, and proved a great success with Internet users and collectors.

== Restoration of Napoleon's tomb ==
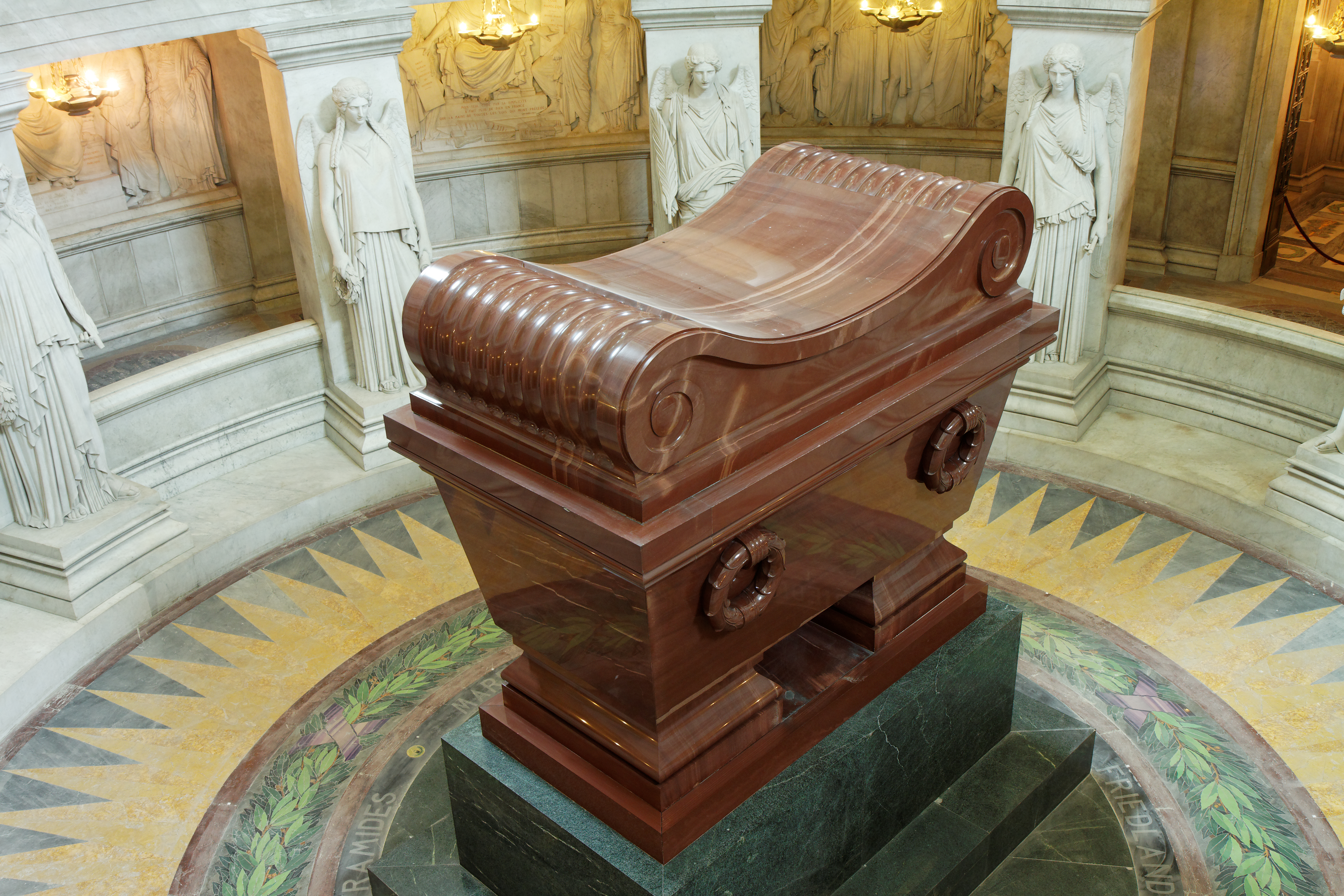
Napoleon's tomb under Les Invalides

On 5 May 2019, the Fondation Napoléon launched an appeal for donations to restore monuments at the Invalides, including the Emperor's tomb, for the bicentenary of his death.

Among the planned renovations were the laurel shield on which Napoleon's sarcophagus rests, which had been damaged by falling stones, the cleaning and restoration of the tombs of his brothers, kings Joseph and Jérôme, and the renovation of the marble floors. The aim was to complete the various works in time for the launch of the "Saison Napoléon 2021", marking the bicentenary of the Emperor's death.

A total of 836,960 euros was raised from various donors, both private individuals and companies, exceeding the initial amount requested for the work (800,000 euros). In a press release, the Musée de l'Armée and the Fondation Napoléon stated: "This extraordinary mobilization is helping to finance part of the work planned as part of this project, and all additional donations will be directed towards the subscription, the restoration of the Emperor's tomb and Napoleonic monuments."

== Controversies ==
=== Ceremony debate ===
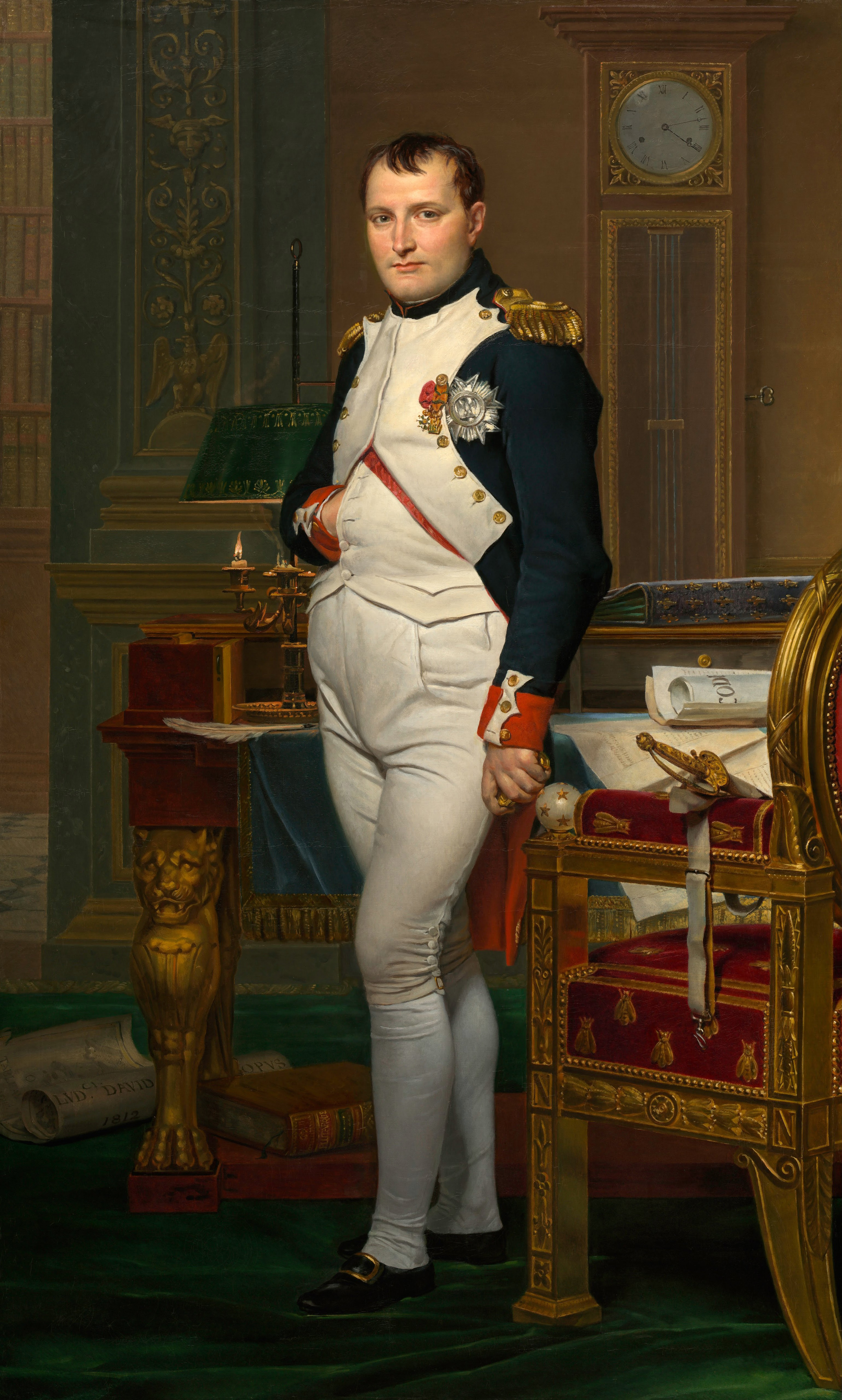
The Emperor Napoleon in His Study at the Tuileries (Jacques-Louis David, 1812).

In France, the organization of ceremonies to commemorate Napoleon's death divided historians and politicians alike. Some emphasized the many traces of his legacy in the France of 2021, such as the Civil code and the Banque de France, while others focused on the wars and the law of 20 May 1802, which re-established slavery in Guadeloupe and Saint-Domingue, and maintained it in Martinique (where it had not been abolished).

Historian Nicolas Offenstadt, for example, questioned the meaning of these commemorations. In his view, commemorating Napoleon "is not self-evident. There is no obligation to commemorate Napoleon or to stage him. It's the same for the Paris Commune".

Other historians, such as Patrice Gueniffey, feared that these commemorations would have been targeted by an intersectional coalition of anti-racist, decolonial, and feminist activists, and canceled.

Organizers of the exhibition at the Grande Halle de la Villette were concerned, and security stepped up. Arthur Chevallier, one of the exhibition's curators, admitted to "walking on eggshells" and feared a "hysterization of the debates". According to him, "The moment is not very healthy, less conducive to the advancement of knowledge than to highly ideological debates".

Political figures such as Jean-Louis Debré also called for caution. "Let's not overdo it: it would be seen as a provocation. Above all, the country needs unity" declared the former President of the French National Assembly.

Opponents of the commemorations included France Insoumise deputy Alexis Corbière. For him, "the Republic has no business celebrating its gravedigger", even if he acknowledged that "intellectual debate should be encouraged on this occasion."

On the side of the French government, the question was divided. Interviewed on RTL on 7 March, Minister Delegate for Equality between Men and Women Élisabeth Moreno said she was not convinced by the idea of organizing a ceremony. According to her, Napoleon was "one of the greatest misogynists". Nevertheless, she declared that she would "join in whatever the government does".

Responding to Élisabeth Moreno, historian Pierre Branda qualified: "We mustn't take Napoleon out of his time. Napoleon was not a revolutionary for the cause of women, but for his time, he was more progressive than others". In response to Alexis Corbière, the historian insisted that Napoleon "reconciled Girondin France, Jacobin France, Royalist France and religious France: Protestant, Catholic and Jewish".

In his Dictionnaire amoureux de Napoléon, Jean Tulard also qualified the image of Napoleon as the "gravedigger" of the ideals of the Revolution. According to the historian, on the contrary, the Civil code made it possible to "consecrate the conquests of the Revolution: equality and the end of feudal rights".

The director of the Fondation Napoléon, Thierry Lentz, was equally incensed by this criticism:

We will defend ourselves! We're not going to let this anniversary be stolen from us. This is the last chance to commemorate the most illustrious figure in our history for a very long time.

Some media personalities, such as Stéphane Bern, saw in this controversy the influence of cancel culture, a boycott practice that originated in the United States. The host declared:

Napoleon is a continuation of the Revolution, and above all, he is a concentration of the contradictions of his time. [...] Napoleon is one of the great French victims of American-style cancel culture, which consists of criticizing without knowing, condemning without knowing. I believe that, rather than being judged, he deserves to be studied. He leaves us with so much that his work deserves to be looked at in retrospect, without adulation or blame.

For members of the Bonaparte family, the fear was above all that there had been confusion between commemorations and bicentenary celebrations. Politician Charles Bonaparte explained:

Commemorating and celebrating are not quite the same thing. The root of the word commemorate means to remember together. We can remember together with different points of view on the same reality. On the other hand, when we celebrate, there's a political and moral judgment involved. That's something I'm less comfortable with.

Historian and president of the Institut Napoléon Jacques-Olivier Boudon confirmed:

Commemorating is not celebrating Napoleon. Celebration is something else. It presupposes a commitment to the character as a whole. As a researcher, I don't have to celebrate Napoleon in particular, but on the other hand, I see no reason why he shouldn't be commemorated.

Finally, many feared that no ceremony would be organized by the French authorities because of the various controversies. As historian and Napoleonic era specialist Jean Tulard explained: "The worst thing would be for there to be nothing. If we keep trying to erase the stains of history, there will come a time when we won't know why the bridge is called Austerlitz and Avenue Iéna. Let's not become a nation with amnesia."

This concern was shared by French historian and Sorbonne professor Jacques-Olivier Boudon, who feared above all that the scenario of December 2005 (when commemorations of the Battle of Austerlitz were cancelled) would have been repeated.

Finally, some local councillors feared that this controversy would have disrupted the organization of cultural events around the bicentenary. Jérôme Pardigon, Rueil-Malmaison town councillor in charge of tourism and events, said:

It's not about being all admirers of the Emperor of the French, or over-glorifying his reign. It's a question of highlighting our country's past and culture, of showing all publics, including the youngest, in exceptional exhibitions, the most beautiful pieces linked to the work of Napoleon Bonaparte [...] Opponents of the bicentenary commemorations want to erase history, and that's extremely dangerous. In a world losing meaning, history maintains some roots for each and every one of us.

=== Slavery controversy ===
Decree of 20 May 1802 authorizing the slave trade and slavery in the colonies restored by the Treaty of Amiens.

Beyond Napoleon's legacy, the point that most crystallized tensions around the bicentenary was the decree of 20 May 1802 signed by Napoleon, then First Consul, which re-established slavery in Guadeloupe and Saint-Domingue, and maintained it in Martinique when the latter was ceded back by the British as part of the Peace of Amiens.

"It's not a task, nor a fault, it's a crime, and even a double crime. France is the only country in the world to have re-established slavery. I don't understand why we continue to celebrate its memory as if nothing had happened. Teaching about Napoleon is one thing, but commemorating him is tantamount to apologizing for a crime" denounced Louis-Georges Tin, Honorary President of the Conseil représentatif des associations noires de France.

In response to this criticism, Thierry Lentz, director of the Fondation Napoléon, replied: "People know very well that he re-established slavery, but we can't reduce him to that. No other personage has left his mark on history."

Historian Jean-Joël Brégeon also pointed out that Napoleon was not initially in favor of re-establishing slavery, and that this decision was influenced by the "Creole party", which demanded the return of slaves to the plantations. "Manipulated by the slave lobby, Bonaparte believed that Guadeloupe was on fire – which was not true – and that the restoration of order required the re-establishment of slavery" confirmed historian Jean-François Niort.

In practice, the impact of this decision was limited. Indeed, the abolition of slavery, decided in 1794 under the French Revolution, had not really materialized on the ground. As historian Alain-Jacques Tornare explained: "We had simply moved from slavery to forced labor." With the decree of 10 May 1802, Napoleon Bonaparte "merely re-established legally a situation that already existed de facto".

This controversial decision was nevertheless the subject of a number of publications in the French press, with some journalists questioning the "racist" nature of the decision. According to Jean-Marc Ayrault, President of the Fondation pour la Mémoire de l'esclavage, this decision was explained more by political pragmatism than anything else. "Napoleon was a cynic. He is neither a racist ideologue, like the colonists around him, nor an abolitionist humanist, like the Abbé Grégoire who opposed him", he declared.

Historian David Chanteranne confirmed:

Napoleon was not a racist. Among the people in Napoleon's entourage and with whom he worked, there were many people of color. They are treated in the same way as people of Caucasian origin.

He added: "Napoleon abolished slavery in Malta in 1798. He also abolished serfdom in Poland and part of Russia. He would also do so in Egypt with the black populations and with the Maghreb populations. This clearly shows that there was no desire for racism or domination by one population over another."

Lastly, Jean-Joël Brégeon recalled that during the Hundred Days, Napoleon abolished the "black slave trade" and the sale of slaves in the French colonies by decree on 29 March 1815.

To calm spirits, a sequence was devoted to the re-establishment of slavery and colonial policy as part of the exhibition on Napoleon at the Grande halle de la Villette. This sequence, organized in partnership with the Fondation pour la Mémoire de l'Esclavage, presented two original copies of the acts signed by Napoleon Bonaparte in 1802:

- The decree of 20 May 1802, which officially maintained slavery where it had not been abolished (in Martinique, Tobago, Mauritius and Reunion Island).
- The consular decree of 16 July 1802, which re-established slavery in Guadeloupe (where it had been abolished in 1794).

== Opinion surveys in France ==
In early March 2021, the regional daily Le Télégramme published an online questionnaire asking Internet users whether "yes or no, it was a good idea to celebrate the bicentenary of Napoleon's death in Pontivy?". As of 5 April 2021, all Internet users who responded were in favor of celebrating this anniversary. Although some expressed reservations about "glorifying" Napoleon, none expressed opposition to organizing events around the bicentenary.

In an interview with Le Parisien, historian Thierry Lentz pointed out that polls place Napoleon at the top of the list of France's favorite personalities, ahead of Charles de Gaulle and Louis XIV.

In any case, the organization of cultural events around Napoleon aroused the interest of part of the population.

== See also ==
- Cultural depictions of Napoleon
- Death of Napoleon I
- Napoleon
