= The Memorial of Saint Helena =

1823 memoir

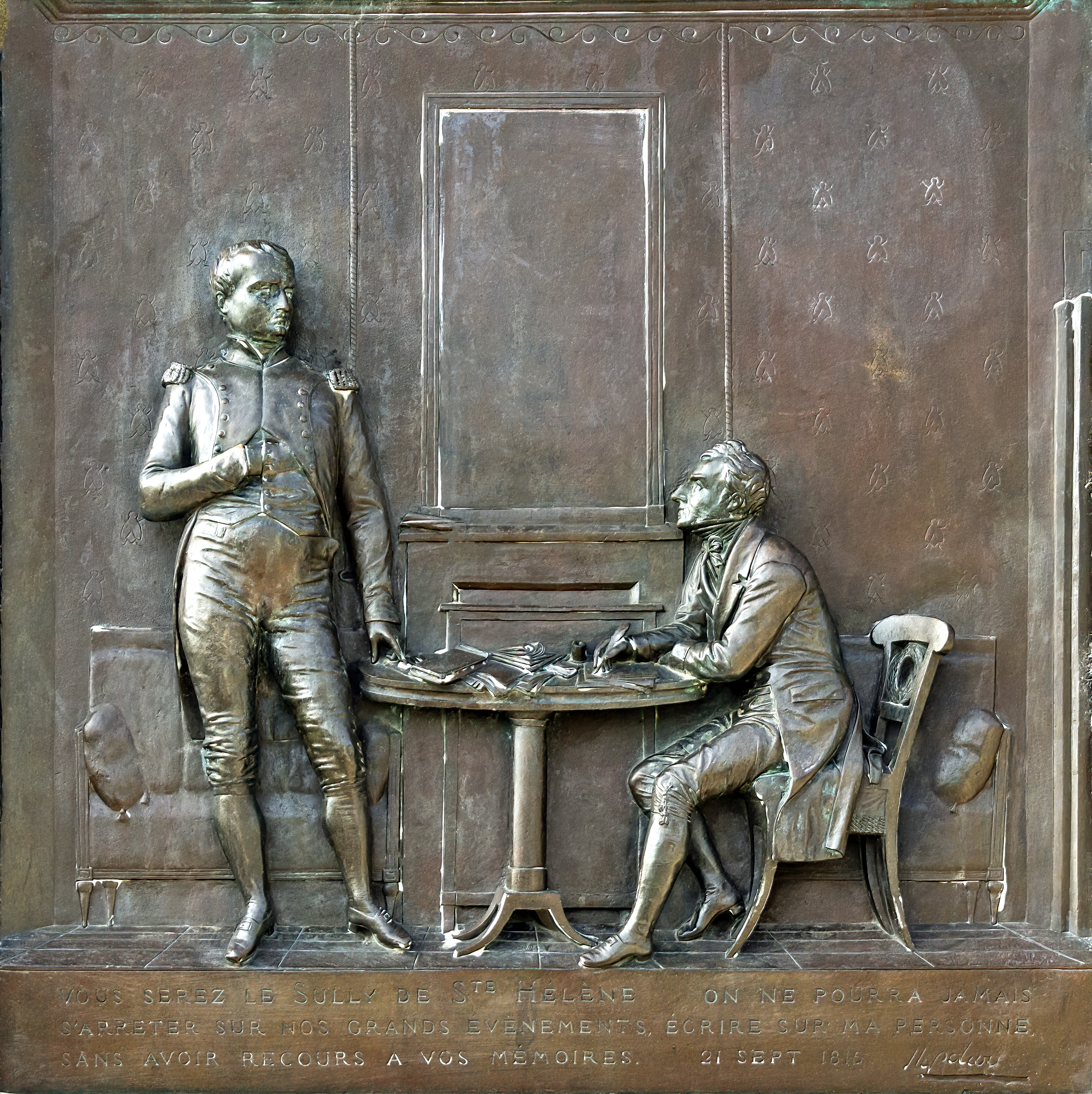
Monument de Las Cases - Bas-relief Vous serez le Sully de Ste-Hélène... Bronze - Jean-Marie Bonnassieux

The Memorial of Saint Helena (French: Le Mémorial de Sainte-Hélène), written by Emmanuel de Las Cases, is a journal-memoir of the beginning of Napoleon Bonaparte's exile on Saint Helena. The core of the work transcribes Las Cases' near-daily conversations with the former Emperor on his life, his career, his political philosophy, and the conditions of his exile.

First published in 1823 after Napoleon's death, the work was an immediate and continuing literary success, receiving multiple translations and appearing in new editions throughout the 19th century and into the 20th. The work entered the popular imagination as something like Napoleon's own personal and political testament, and as such became a founding text in the development of the Napoleon cult and the ideology of Bonapartism.

Charles de Gaulle, Leader of Free France during World War Two and President of France from 1958 and 1969, used it as inspiration for his memoirs.

== Composition and publication ==
Las Cases began his journal on June 20, 1815, two days after Napoleon's defeat at Waterloo, and continued it until his expulsion from St. Helena on orders of the island's governor, Hudson Lowe, at the end of the following year.

According to Las Cases, the project of the Memorial commenced in early August, 1815 aboard the Bellerophon, where Napoleon was waiting for the ship that would transport him and a small party of companions to St. Helena. Napoleon suggests he finds comfort in the thought of suicide, but Las Cases insists there will still be purpose for them in the "desolate place" of exile:

"Sire, ... we will live on the past: there is enough in it to satisfy us. Do we not enjoy the life of Caesar and that of Alexander? We shall possess still more, you will re-peruse yourself, Sire!" "Be it so!" rejoined Napoleon; "we will write our Memoirs."

At some point Las Cases began a daily routine of transcribing notes of the Emperor's conversation, leaving his son Emmanuel the task of producing a fair copy. From time to time Las Cases would provide Napoleon with excerpts to read, thus assuring himself of Napoleon's imprimatur.

Being found in possession of personal letters that he was attempting to send surreptitiously to Europe, Las Cases was arrested on November 25, 1816, and expelled from St. Helena a month later. British authorities confiscated the manuscript of the Memorial and sent it to England in the keeping of the Secretary of State for War and the Colonies, Henry Bathurst. The manuscript was not returned to Las Cases until five years later, following the Emperor's death.

The Memorial was reprinted for the first time less than a year after its publication in 1823, and was translated into English, German, Italian, Spanish and Swedish. It was one of the bestselling books in France in the years between 1826 and 1840.

In 1935, it was included in the French classics series La Pléiade, published by the Éditions Gallimard in a two-volume edition by Gérard Walter, historian of the French Revolution. It will be published in a boxed set in the same collection to mark the bicentenary of the death of Napoleon in 2021.

== New version based on an original manuscript ==
A copy of the memorial was in the British Library in the collections deposited in 1965 by the family of the then British Secretary of State for War, Lord Bathurst, superior of the Governor of St Helena, Hudson Lowe. This is the original memorial. It was republished in France in 2017 by the Éditions Perrin with a text prepared, presented and commented on by Thierry Lentz, Peter Hicks, François Houdecek and Chantal Prévost from the Fondation Napoléon.

== Film adaptation ==
- Le Mémorial de Sainte-Hélène (or La Captivité de Napoléon), 1911, a French silent film of 20 minutes and 20 seconds, directed by Michel Carré.
