= Death of Napoleon =

1821 death in Saint Helena

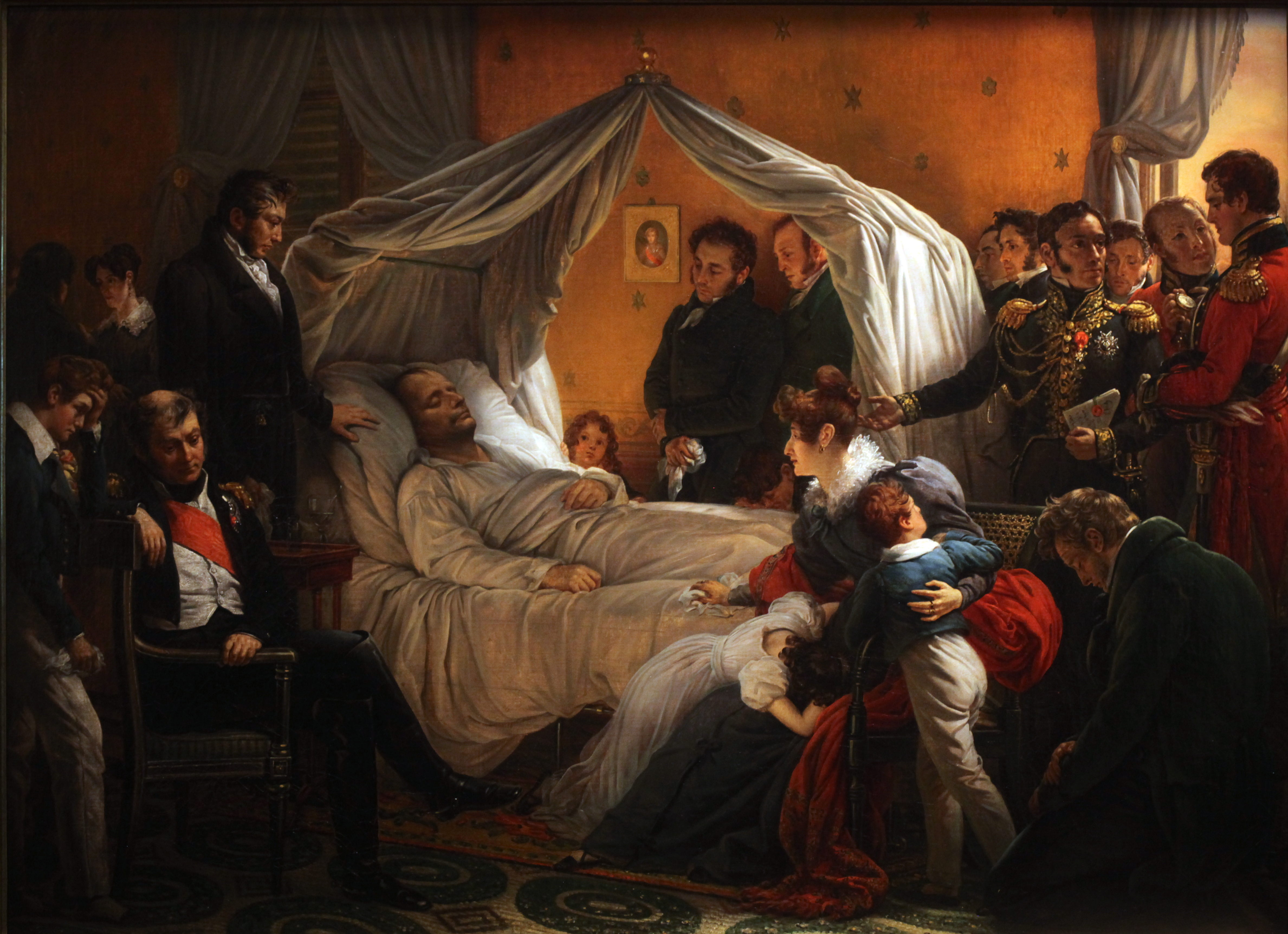
La Mort de Napoléon à Sainte-Hélène, painting by Charles de Steuben (circa 1828).

Napoleon Bonaparte died on 5 May 1821 at Longwood, on the Atlantic island of Saint Helena, where he had been exiled following his defeat at the battle of Waterloo and his abdication as Emperor of the French. He was 51 years old. An autopsy concluded that he had died of internal bleeding caused by stomach cancer.

Napoleon and 27 followers had arrived at Saint Helena in October 1815. In mid-1817 his health worsened and his physician diagnosed chronic hepatitis. In November 1818 the allies announced that he would remain a prisoner on Saint Helena for life. He became depressed and more isolated, spending longer periods in his rooms, which further undermined his health. From July 1820 he suffered frequent stomach pains, nausea and vomiting. In March 1821 he was confined to bed and he was given the last rites on 3 May. Following his death, he was buried on Saint Helena, but his remains were transferred to Paris in 1840.

Despite the conclusion of the original autopsies, there has been scholarly debate on the cause of Napoleon's death. A theory that he died from deliberate arsenic poisoning has been rejected by numerous scholarly studies and historians in the 21st century. Other theories of the cause of his death include a perforated gastric ulcer, chronic bleeding from a mass of gastric ulcerations, and accidental calomel poisoning. A 2021 study by an international team of gastrointestinal pathologists concluded that Napoleon died of stomach cancer.

== Background ==
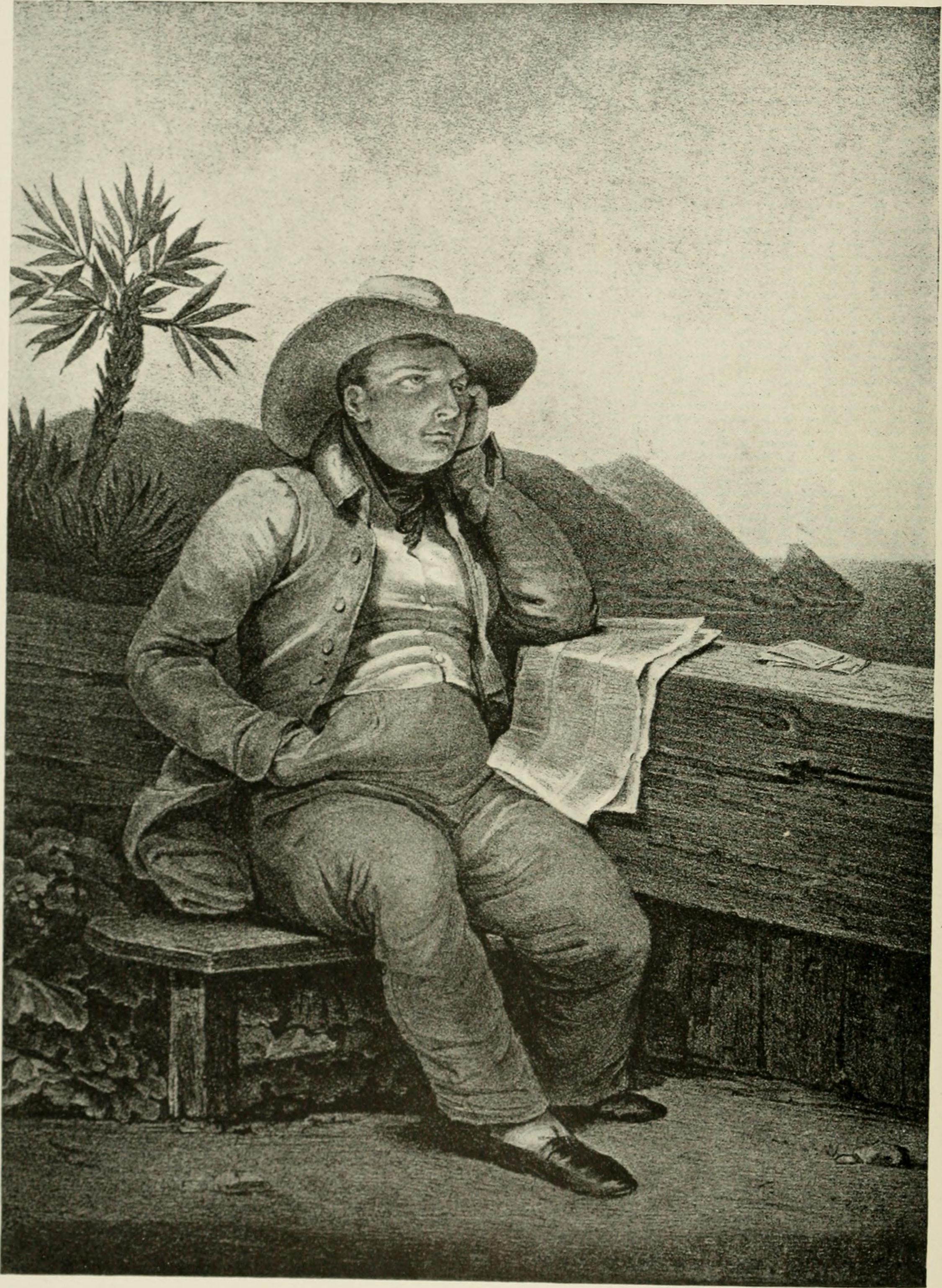
Napoleon on Saint Helena. An engraving of a painting by Horace Vernet

Following Napoleon's defeat at the battle of Waterloo and his subsequent abdication, he was held in British custody and transferred to the island of Saint Helena in the Atlantic Ocean, 1,870 km (1,010 nmi) from the west coast of Africa. Napoleon and 27 followers arrived at Jamestown in October 1815 on board HMS Northumberland.

Napoleon stayed for two months at a pavilion in Briars before he was moved to Longwood House, a 40-room wooden bungalow. The location and interior of the house were damp, windswept, rat-infested and unhealthy. The Times published articles insinuating the British government was trying to hasten his death. Napoleon often complained of his living conditions in letters to the island's governor Hudson Lowe while his attendants complained of "colds, catarrhs, damp floors and poor provisions".

Napoleon circulated reports of poor treatment in the hope that public opinion would force the allies to revoke his exile on Saint Helena. Under instructions from the government, Lowe cut Napoleon's expenditure, refused to recognize him as a former emperor, and made his supporters sign a guarantee they would stay with him indefinitely. Accounts of Napoleon's treatment led in March 1817 to a debate in the British Parliament where Henry Vassall-Fox, 3rd Baron Holland made a call for a public inquiry.

In mid-1817, Napoleon's health worsened. His physician, Barry O'Meara, diagnosed chronic hepatitis and warned Lowe that he could die from the poor climate and lack of exercise. Lowe thought O'Meara was exaggerating and dismissed him in July 1818. In November 1818 the allies announced that Napoleon would remain a prisoner on Saint Helena for life. When he learnt the news, he became depressed and more isolated, spending longer periods in his rooms, which further undermined his health. Much of his entourage left Saint Helena including Emmanuel, comte de Las Cases in December 1816, General Gaspard Gourgaud in March 1818, and Albine de Montholon in July 1819. In September 1819 two priests and the physician François Carlo Antommarchi joined Napoleon's retinue.

== Declining health and death ==
From July 1820 Napoleon suffered from severe stomach pains, nausea and vomiting, and on 17 March 1821 he was confined to bed. In April he wrote two wills declaring that he had been assassinated by the "English oligarchy", that the Bourbons would fall, and that his son would rule France. He left his fortune to 97 legatees and asked to be buried by the Seine. By late April he was vomiting blood and a dark fluid. On 3 May he was given the last rites but could not take communion due to his illness. On 4 May there was some hope following a high dose of calomel (toxic mercury chloride) administered by his English physician Archibald Arnott and two of his colleagues, but against the advice of Antommarchi. A few hours later, Napoleon vomited blood and his pulse became rapid. He died on 5 May 1821 at age 51. His last words, variously recorded by those present, were either France, l'armée, tête d'armée, Joséphine ("France, the army, head of the army, Joséphine"), or qui recule...à la tête d'armée ("who retreats... at the head of the army") or "France, my son, the Army."

== Autopsy and burial ==
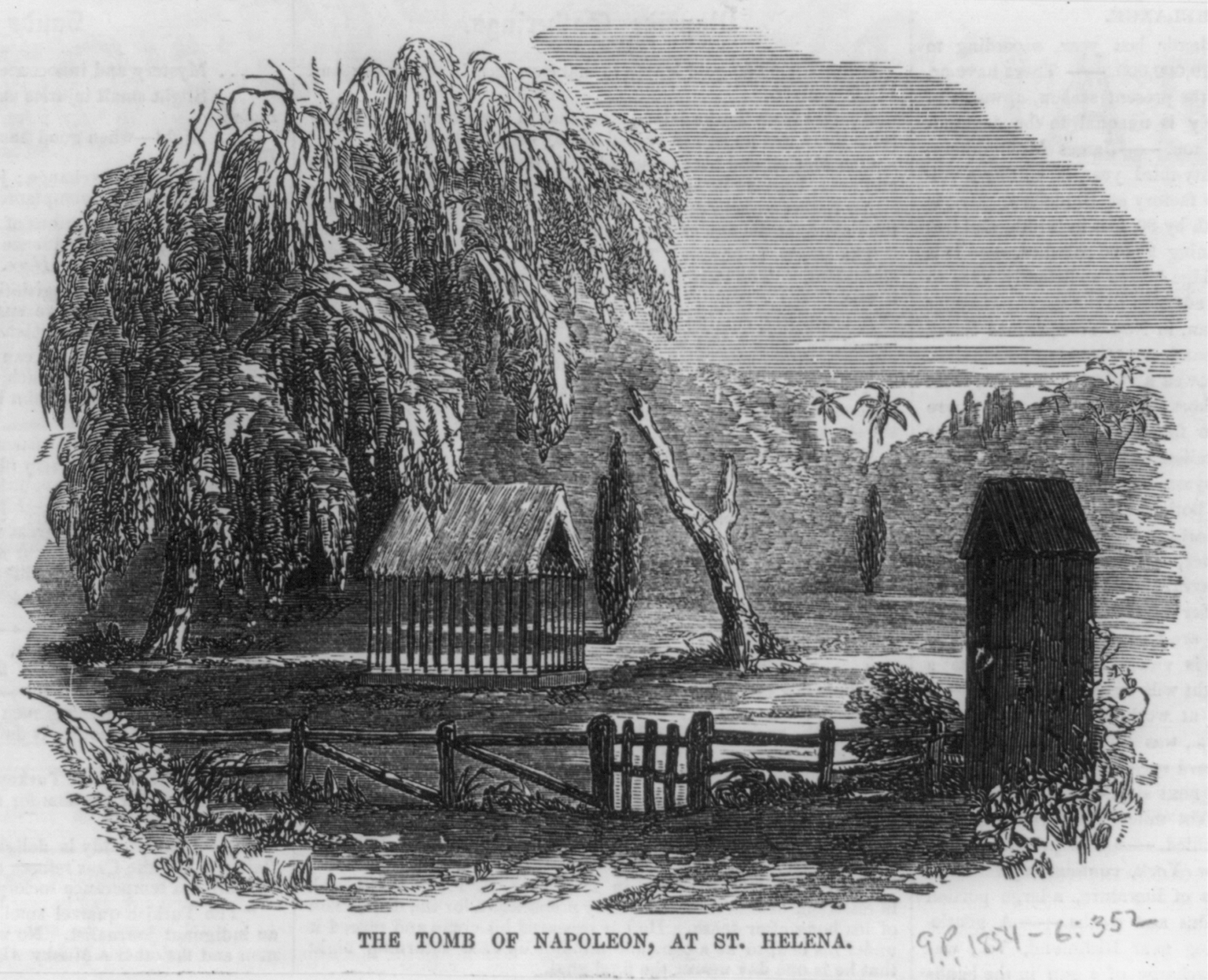
Tomb of Napoleon, Saint Helena

An autopsy was performed on 6 May, conducted by Antommarchi in the presence of seven British medical practitioners. Antommarchi and the British wrote separate autopsy reports, each concluding that Napoleon had died of internal bleeding caused by stomach cancer, the disease that had killed his father. Five autopsy reports were eventually produced: Antommarchi's original report of 8 May, the official British report by Thomas Shortt, an unofficial report to Lowe by medical officer Thomas Reade, another unofficial report to Lowe by Assistant Surgeon Walter Henry in 1823, and Antommarchi's detailed report of 1825. This 1825 report was partially plagiarized and is considered unreliable.

Napoleon was buried with military honours in the Valley of the Geraniums, Saint Helena. His heart and intestines were removed and sealed inside his coffin. His penis was allegedly removed during the autopsy and sold and exhibited. In 1840 the British government gave Louis Philippe I permission to return Napoleon's remains to France. His body was exhumed and found to be well preserved as it had been sealed in four coffins (two of metal and two of mahogany) and placed in a masonry tomb. On 15 December 1840 a state funeral was held in Paris with 700,000 to 1,000,000 attendees who lined the route of the funeral procession to the chapel of Les Invalides. The coffin was later placed in the cupola in St Jérôme's Chapel, where it remained until Napoleon's tomb, designed by Louis Visconti, was completed. In 1861, during the reign of Napoleon III, his remains were entombed in a sarcophagus in the crypt under the dome at Les Invalides.

== Reaction ==
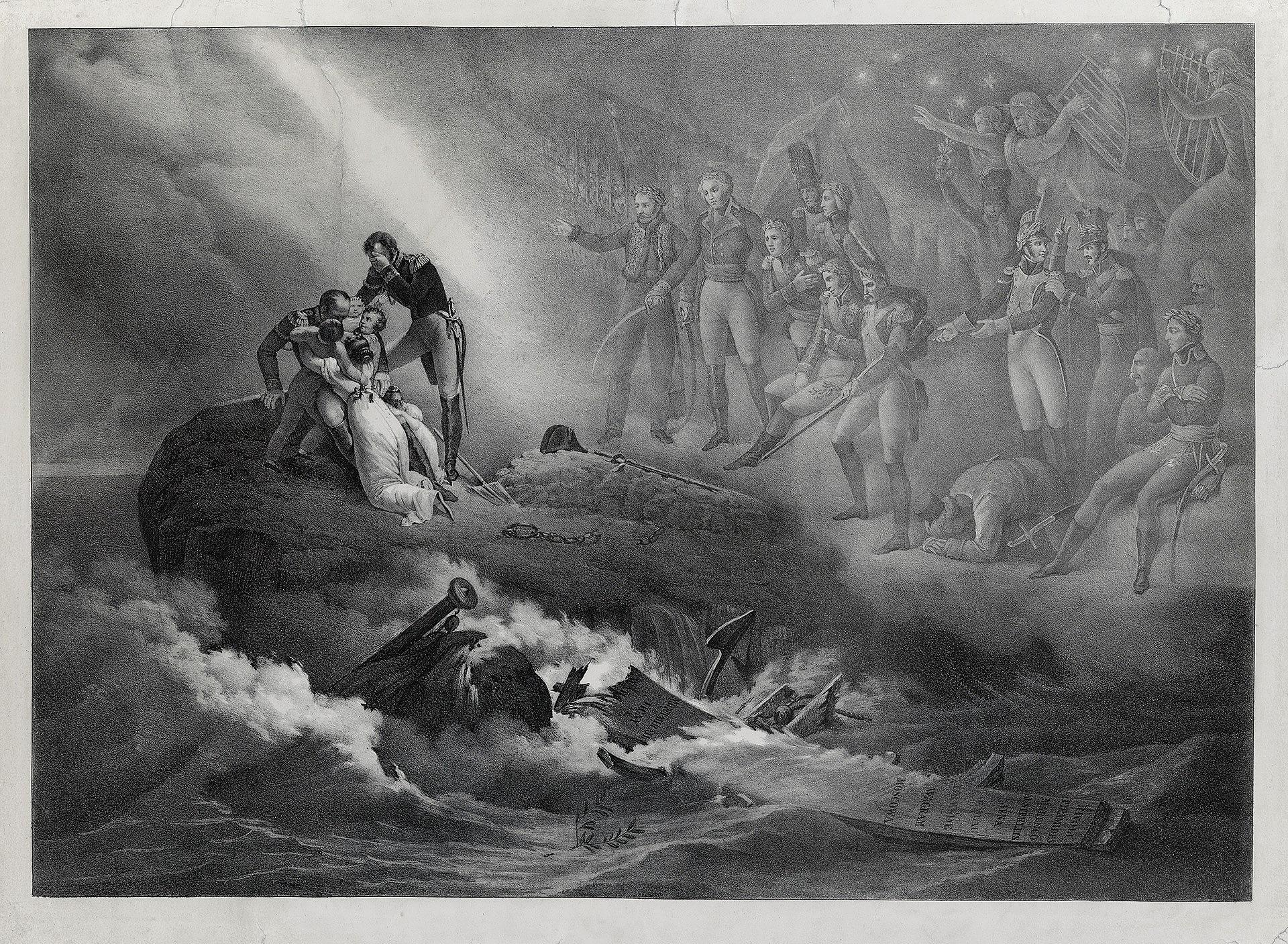
Later engraving of Vernet's Napoleon's Tomb (1822)

When news of Napoleon's death reached England on 4 July 1821, reaction in the British press ranged from qualified acknowledgement of his greatness to polemics depicting him as a war-mongering tyrant. Reaction in France was also polarized between public mourning and castigation of his memory by royalists and some liberals. From July to November 1821, 164 pamphlets appeared debating his legacy. Although the police reported public indifference to the news in most regions of France, in Paris crowds gathered to read newspaper reports and buy cheap engravings depicting his death. However, the restoration regime's strict censorship and laws forbidding public support for Napoleon make it difficult to assess the public response to his death. Pamphlets claiming that Napoleon had been poisoned soon appeared. Rumours that he was still alive and would return to France persisted into the 1830s, as did false sightings of the former emperor.

Literary figures including Alessandro Manzoni, Lord Byron, Percy Bysshe Shelley, Franz Grillparzer, and Alexander Pushkin wrote reflections on Napoleon's death. Paintings, lithographs and engravings proliferated, often depicting Napoleon's death in quasi-religious terms as an apotheosis. Horace Vernet's Napoleon's Tomb (1821) depicts Napoleon ascending into an imperial Valhalla. The painting was suppressed by the restoration regime and was first publicly exhibited in 1830.

== Cause of death ==
Despite the conclusion of the two initial autopsy reports, there has been considerable scholarly debate about the cause of Napoleon's death.

=== Stomach cancer ===
The original autopsy reports concluded that Napoleon died of gastric cancer associated with a perforated ulcer. A 2021 study by an international team of eight gastrointestinal pathologists again concluded that Napoleon died of stomach cancer.

=== Ulcer and chronic gastritis ===
Antommarchi and the British doctors noted in their autopsy reports the existence of a chronic perforated gastric ulcer, probably evolving into cancer, and pulmonary lesions linked to tuberculosis. Walter Henry's report of 1823 confirmed this ulcer, aggravated by cancerous ulcerations. Thierry Lentz and Jacques Macé, writing in 2009, considered this thesis, which corresponds to the initial report, to be the most historically credible.

A study published in 2007 suggested that Napoleon died of a haemorrhage associated with a gastric tumour. This study, however, is based on Antommarchi's report of 1825, which partly plagiarizes a medical article published in 1823 and is now considered unreliable. Nevertheless, the 2007 study concluded that clinical descriptions of Napoleon's decline (notably the loss of around ten kilos in the last six months of his life) was consistent with terminal stomach cancer and concluded this was probably caused by an ulcer of bacterial origin (Helicobacter pylori).

Alain Golcher, writing in 2012, studied the initial autopsy reports and concluded that the perforated gastric ulcer did not cause Napoleon's death. He argued that Napoleon suffered from fibrosis, dating from several weeks or months before death, but that the cause of death was a mass of ulcerations causing chronic microscopic bleeding, leading to iron deficiency, anaemia, and death from exsanguination.

The international study of 2021 concluded that Golcher's thesis stood "on extremely shaky ground", as Napoleon showed many of the symptoms of gastric cancer, his health decline was consistent with cancer progression, his anaemia could have been caused by a tumour, and the macroscopic description in the two original autopsy reports is not consistent with chronic gastritis.

=== Arsenic poisoning theory ===
A paper published in 1961, written by Swedish dentist Sten Forshufvud and others, reported elevated levels of arsenic in Napoleon's hair and concluded that he had died of arsenic poisoning. A number of studies from 2003 to 2006, led by Pascal Kintz, President of the Association Internationale des Toxicologues de Médecine Légale, also studied samples of Napoleon's hair and concluded that Napoleon was possibly murdered by arsenic poisoning.

In 2008, the Italian Institute of Nuclear Physics (INFN) of the Universities of Milan and Pavia studied hair samples conserved in Napoleonic museums in France and Italy (Musée Glauco-Lombardide Parme, Musée Napoléonien de Rome and Musée du Château de Malmaison). It concluded that arsenic levels in Napoleon's hair were abnormally high, but comparable to those found in the hair of his youth, and not exceptional compared to the levels found in samples from Josephine de Beauharnais and Napoleon II. The institute noted that the quantity of arsenic observed in these samples was a hundred times higher than the level measured today, and observed that "in the emperor and his contemporaries, you find a level of arsenic that would be considered toxic today". The authors concluded, "the concentration of the substance would not be enough to cause Napoleon's death".

Subsequent studies by Golcher and others have ruled out the theory that Napoleon was killed by deliberate arsenic poisoning. Historian Phillip Dwyer has called the thesis a conspiracy theory.

=== Other theories ===
In 2009 Danish physician Arne Soerensen suggested that Napoleon died of urinary and kidney problems. The 2021 international report on Napoleon's death rejected another theory that he died of poisoning resulting from the administration of calomel two days before his death. The report notes that Napoleon was already tachycardic and the autopsy reports suggest that calomel was just a trigger for the gastric bleeding.

== Commemorations ==
=== Annual events ===
Every 5 May a public ceremony is held around the tomb of the French Emperor on Saint Helena to mark the anniversary of his death.

At Les Invalides in Paris, ceremonies including wreath-laying and religious ceremonies are organized every year jointly by the Military Governor of Paris, the Governor of Les Invalides, descendants of Napoleon and the Fondation Napoléon.

=== Bicentenary ===
Commemorations during the bicentenary of Napoleon's death in 2021 were low-key compared with those for the bicentenary of his birth in 1969. Unlike 1969, there was no state organisational committee for bicentennial events, and there were restriction on public events in general in response to the COVID-19 pandemic. The private Fondation Napoléon declared 2021 the "Année Napoléon" ("Napoleon Year") and promoted numerous events.

The major state-sanctioned events involved the French President Emmanuel Macron delivering a speech on Napoleon's legacy at the Institut de France on 5 May, followed by a wreath-laying ceremony at Les Invalides. There were, however, numerous events across France organized by cultural institutions and private organisations. Major events included the exhibition Napoléon n’est plus (Napoleon is no more) organized by the Musée de l’Armée (army museum) at Les Invalides, the exhibition Napoléon organized by the Réunion des Musées Nationaux (Association of National Museums) and Napoléon aux 1001 visages (1001 Faces of Napoleon) at the Château de Malmaison.

The bicentenary year stimulated considerable public debate in France over Napoleon's legacy. Many commentators argued that there was insufficient emphasis on slavery, colonialism and Napoleon's authoritarianism and misogyny. Historians such as Jean Tulard, Pierre Branda and Thierry Lentz variously criticized some events as disrespectful, and opposition to commemorations as attempts to "cancel" Napoleon.

== Cultural representations ==
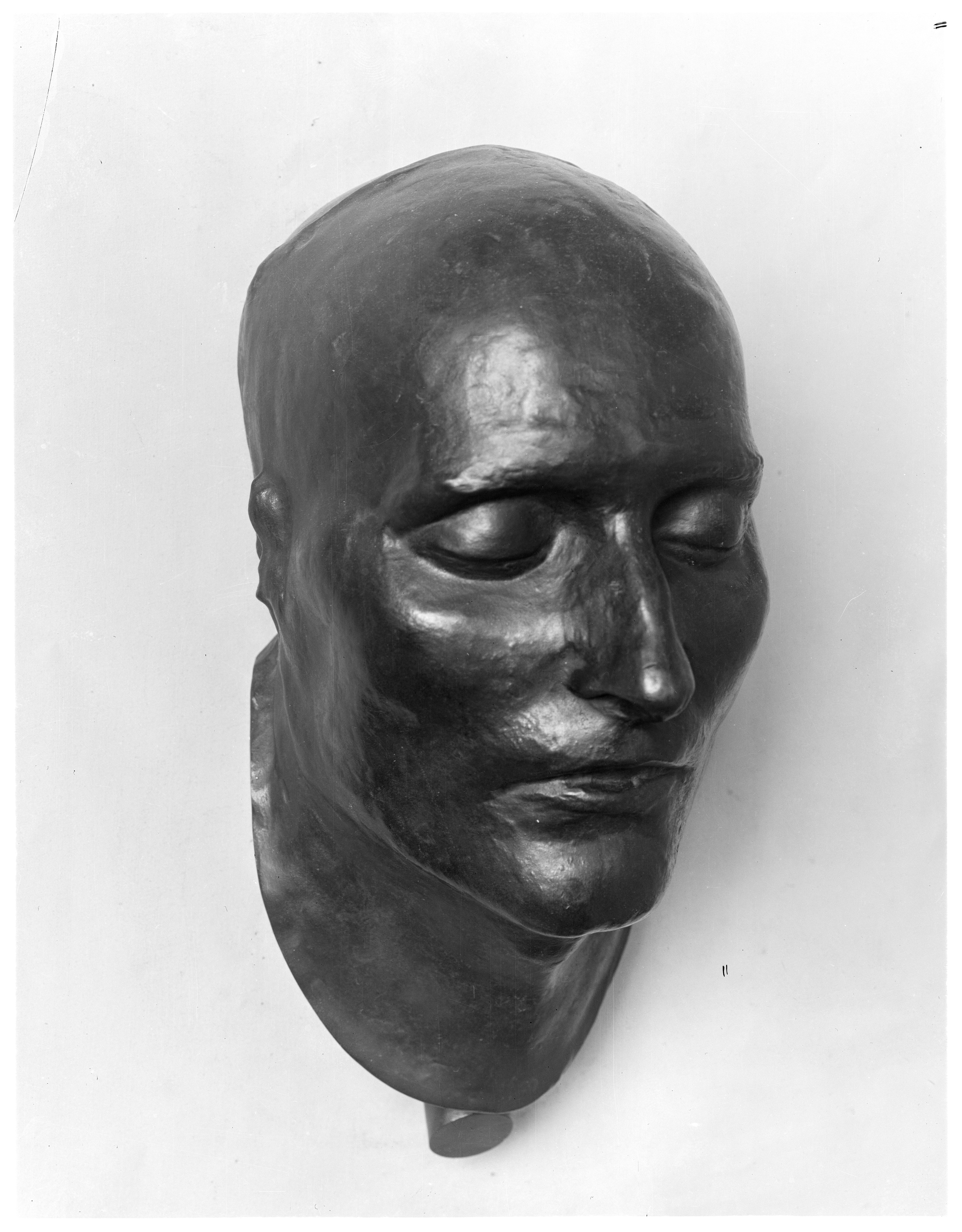
Death mask of Napoleon

Napoleon's death stimulated many literary works. Manzoni's poem Il 5 maggio (The 5 May) celebrates Napoleon as the modernizer of Italy. The poem was translated into English, French and German and inspired responses from many of the leading literary figures of Europe including Johann Wolfgang von Goethe, Alphonse de Lamartine and Victor Hugo. Memoirs by those who knew Napoleon on Saint Helena were very popular: Las Cases' Memorial de Sainte-Hélène (1822) went through 16 editions by 1900 and Barry O'Meara's Napoleon in Exile; or, A Voice from St. Helena went through 12.

Pierre-Jean de Béranger's song "My God, isn't it true that he's not dead" was popular in 1829. Honoré de Balzac's novel The Country Doctor (1833) includes a character who believes Napoleon is still alive.

There are many paintings, lithographs and engravings inspired by Napoleon's death. Early deathbed scenes ranged from documentary sketches such as Frederik Marryat's "Sketch of Bonaparte as laid out on his Austerlitz camp-bed" (1821) to large-scale romanticized works such as La Mort de Napoléon à Sainte-Hélène (1828) by Charles de Steuben. Later works include Napoleon on his Deathbed, One Hour Before Being Shrouded (1843) by Jean-Baptiste Mauzaisse and the sculpture Napoleon Dying on St Helena (1866) by Vincenzo Vela.

A plaster or wax death mask of Napoleon was made by British surgeon Francis Burton a few days after Napoleon's death. Antommarchi made plaster and bronze copies which became popular items in Paris in the 1820s.

== See also ==
- Napoleon's exile to Saint Helena
- Monsieur N., a French film about Napoleon on Saint Helena by Antoine de Caunes, released in 2003
- The Hostage of Europe, a Franco-Polish film about Napoleon on Saint Helena directed by Jerzy Kawalerowicz, released in 1989
- The Death of Napoleon, a 1986 novella by Simon Leys (pen name of Pierre Ryckmans)

== Works cited ==
- Dwyer, Phillip (2018). Napoleon: Passion, Death and Resurrection, 1815–1840. Oxford: Bloomsbury Publishing. ISBN 978-1-4088-9175-9.
- McLynn, Frank (1997). Napoleon: a Biography. London: Jonathan Cape. ISBN 0-2240-4072-3.
- Roberts, Andrew (2014). Napoleon: A Life. Penguin Group. ISBN 978-0-6700-2532-9.
- Schom, Alan (1997). Napoleon Bonaparte. HarperCollins. ISBN 978-0-0601-7214-5.
- Zamoyski, Adam (2018). Napoleon: The Man Behind The Myth. Great Britain: HarperCollins. ISBN 978-0-0081-1607-1.
