= Gaspard Gourgaud =

French Army officer (1783–1852)

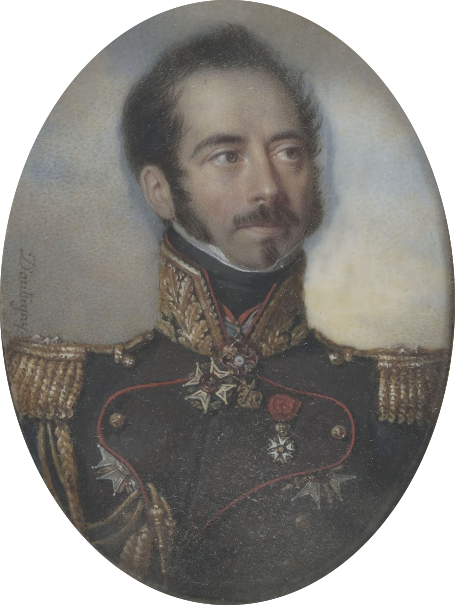
- Portrait of Gourgaud
- Born: 14 November 1783; Versailles, Île-de-France
- Died: 25 July 1852 (aged 68); Paris, France
- Military career
- Allegiance: French First Republic; First French Empire; Kingdom of France
- Branch: French Revolutionary Army; French Imperial Army; French Royal Army
- Service years: 1802–1848
- Rank: Maréchal de camp
- Conflicts: Napoleonic Wars

Maréchal de camp Gaspard, Baron Gourgaud (14 September 1783 – 25 July 1852) was a French Army officer who served in the Napoleonic Wars.

== Life ==
He was born at Versailles; his father was a musician of the royal chapel. At school he showed talent in mathematical studies and later joined the artillery. In 1802 he became junior lieutenant, and thereafter served with credit in the campaigns of 1803-1805, being wounded at the Battle of Austerlitz. He was present at the siege of Saragossa in 1808, returned to service in Central Europe and took part in nearly all the battles of the Danubian campaign of 1809.

In 1811 he was chosen to inspect and report on the fortifications of Gdańsk. Thereafter he became one of the ordnance officers attached to the emperor, whom he followed closely through the Russian campaign of 1812; he was one of the first to enter the Kremlin and discovered there a quantity of gunpowder which might have been used for the destruction of Moscow. For his services in this campaign he received the title of baron, and became first ordnance officer. In the campaign of 1813 in Saxony he again showed courage and prowess, especially at Leipzig and Hanau; but it was in the first battle of 1814, near to Brienne, that he rendered the most significant service by killing the leader of a small band of Cossacks who were riding furiously towards Napoleon.

Wounded at the Battle of Montmirail, he recovered in time to be involved in several of the conflicts which followed, distinguishing himself especially at Laon and Reims. Though enlisted in the Royal Guard of King Louis XVIII in the summer of 1814, he embraced the cause of Napoleon during the Hundred Days (1815), was named general and aide-de-camp by the emperor, and fought at Waterloo.

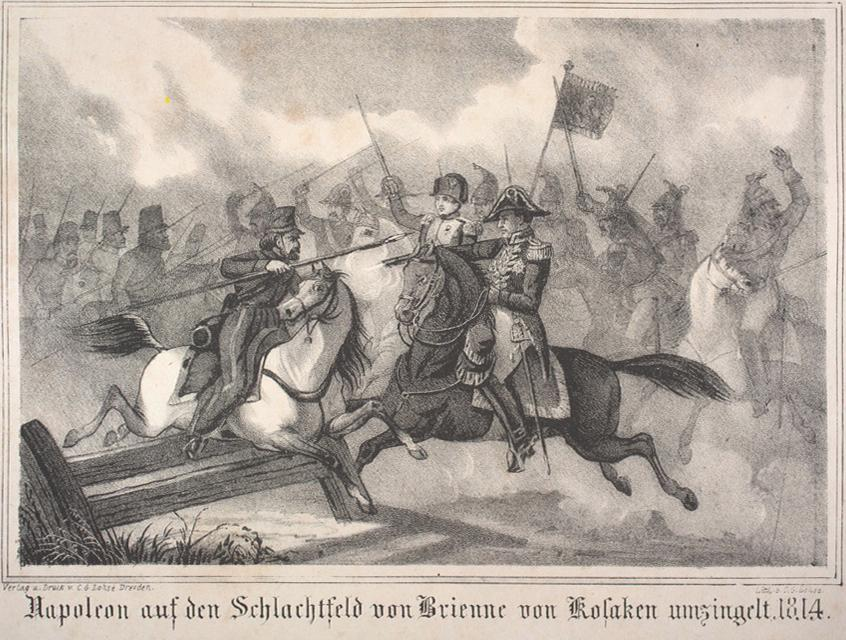
Gourgaud saving Napoleon I's life at the Battle of Brienne (1814).

After the second abdication of the emperor (June 22, 1815), Gourgaud retired with him to Rochefort. It was to Gourgaud that Napoleon entrusted the letter of appeal to George, Prince of Wales and Prince Regent, for asylum in England. Gourgaud set off in HMS Slaney, but was not allowed to land in England. Determined to share Napoleon's exile, he sailed with him on HMS Northumberland to Saint Helena.

His extreme sensitivity and vanity soon brought him into collision with Napoleon's other companions, Las Cases and Montholon, in their exile at Longwood. The former he styles in his journal a Jesuit and a scribbler who went there only to become famous. The friction with Montholon, his senior in rank, was so acute that he challenged him to a duel, for which he was sharply rebuked by Napoleon himself. Tiring of the life at Longwood, he decided to leave the island. The comments he made to his English captors helped to convince Hudson Lowe that Napoleon was feigning illness, that he should not be moved from Longwood, and they led indirectly to the expulsion of Napoleon's doctor, Barry Edward O'Meara. Once in London, Gourgaud quickly demonstrated his support for Napoleon by sending letters to the Empress Marie-Louise and to the Emperors of Austria and Russia. In 1840, he joined other survivors of the captivity who returned to St. Helena to bring back Napoleon's remains for burial in Paris. He also sharply criticised Sir Walter Scott's Life of Napoleon.

He soon published his Campagne de 1815, in the preparation of which he had had some help from Napoleon. However, Gourgaud's Journal de Ste-Hélène was not published till the year 1899. Entering the arena of letters, he wrote, or collaborated in, two well-known critiques. The first was a censure of Count Philippe-Paul de Ségur's work on the campaign of 1812, with the result that he fought a duel with that officer and wounded him. He became a deputy to the Legislative Assembly in 1849.

== Works ==
Gourgaud's works are:

- La Campagne de 1815 (London and Paris, 1818);
- Napoléon et la Grande Armée en Russie
- Examen critique de l'ouvrage de M. le comte P. de Ségur (Paris, 1824)
- Refutation de la vie de Napoleon par Sir Walter Scott (Paris, 1827)

He collaborated with Montholon in the work entitled Mémoires pour servir a l'histoire de France sous Napoleon (Paris, 1822–1823), and with Belliard and others in the work entitled Bourrienne et ses erreurs (2 vols., Paris, 1830). Gourgaud's most important work is the Journal inédit de Ste-Hélène (2 vols., Paris, 1899), which is a remarkably lifelike record of life in exile at Longwood. See also

- Notes and Reminiscences of a Staff Officer, by Basil Jackson (London, 1904).
- "Le général Gourgaud", by Jacques Macé (Éditions Nouveau Monde/Fondation Napoléon, 2006).

== See also ==
- The Saint Helena Journal of General Baron Gourgaud
