= The Saint Helena Journal of General Baron Gourgaud =

The Saint Helena Journal of General Baron Gourgaud is a private journal written down by Gaspard Gourgaud as a result of his conversations with Napoleon I of France between June 1815 and March 1818 during the former's exile on Saint Helena.

According to Lord Rosebery, "The one capital and superior record of life at St. Helena is the private journal of General Gourgaud. It was written, in the main at least, for his own eye, without flattery or even prejudice. It is sometimes almost brutal in its realism. He alone of all the chroniclers strove to be accurate, and on the whole succeeded."

This journal, which consists of about twelve hundred printed pages, was not published until 1899.

== Editions ==
=== In French ===
- Sainte-Hélène. Journal inédit de 1815 à 1818, ed. le Vicomte de Grouchy & Antoine Guillois. Two volumes, Paris: Ernest Flammarion, 1899.
- Journal de Sainte-Hélène, 1815-1818, augmented edition by Octave Aubry. Two volumes, Paris: Ernest Flammarion, 1944.
- Journal de Sainte-Hélène. Version intégrale, ed. Jacques Macé, introd. Thierry Lentz. Paris: Perrin, Fondation Napoléon, 2019.

=== In English ===
- Talks of Napoleon at St. Helena with General Baron Gourgaud, together with the journal kept by Gourgaud on their journey from Waterloo to St Helena [Extracted from "Sainte-Hélene: journal inédit de 1815 a 1818"]. Translated, and with notes, by Elizabeth Wormeley Latimer. London, Chicago: C. F. Cazenove, 1903, republished in 1903 by A.C. McClurg & Co. (Chicago) and in 1904 by Grant Richard (London).
- The St. Helena Journal of General Baron Gourgaud, 1815-1818. Translated by Sydney Gallard, edited with an introduction by Norman Edwards; preface by Hilaire Belloc. London: John Lane, 1932
