= Emmanuel, comte de Las Cases =

19th century French cartographer

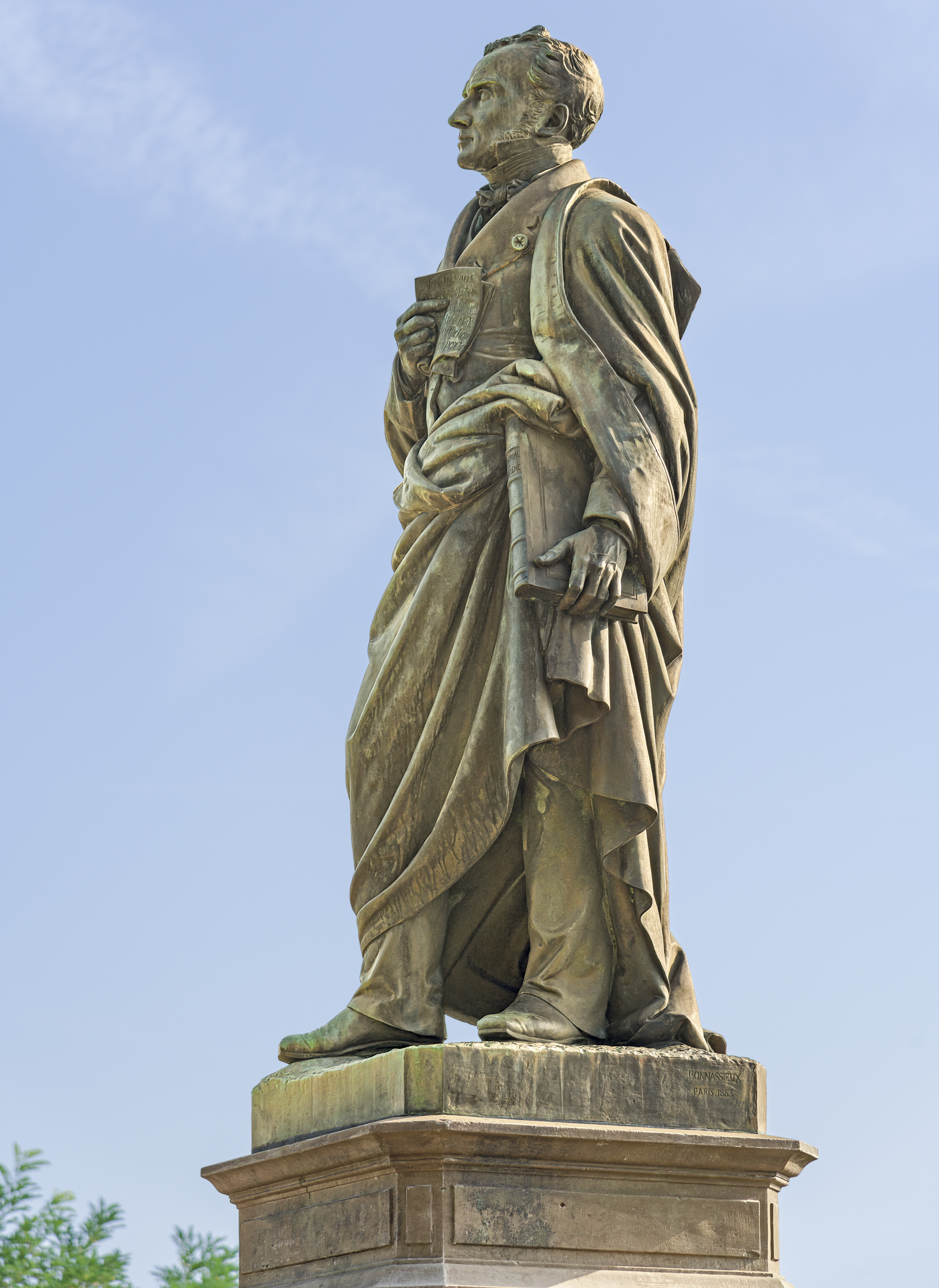
Statue of Emmanuel, comte de Las Cases in Lavaur, Tarn

Emmanuel-Augustin-Dieudonné-Joseph, comte de Las Cases (21 June 1766 – 15 May 1842) was a French atlas-maker and author, famed for an admiring book about Napoleon, Le Mémorial de Sainte-Hélène ("The Memorial of Saint Helena").

== Life and career ==
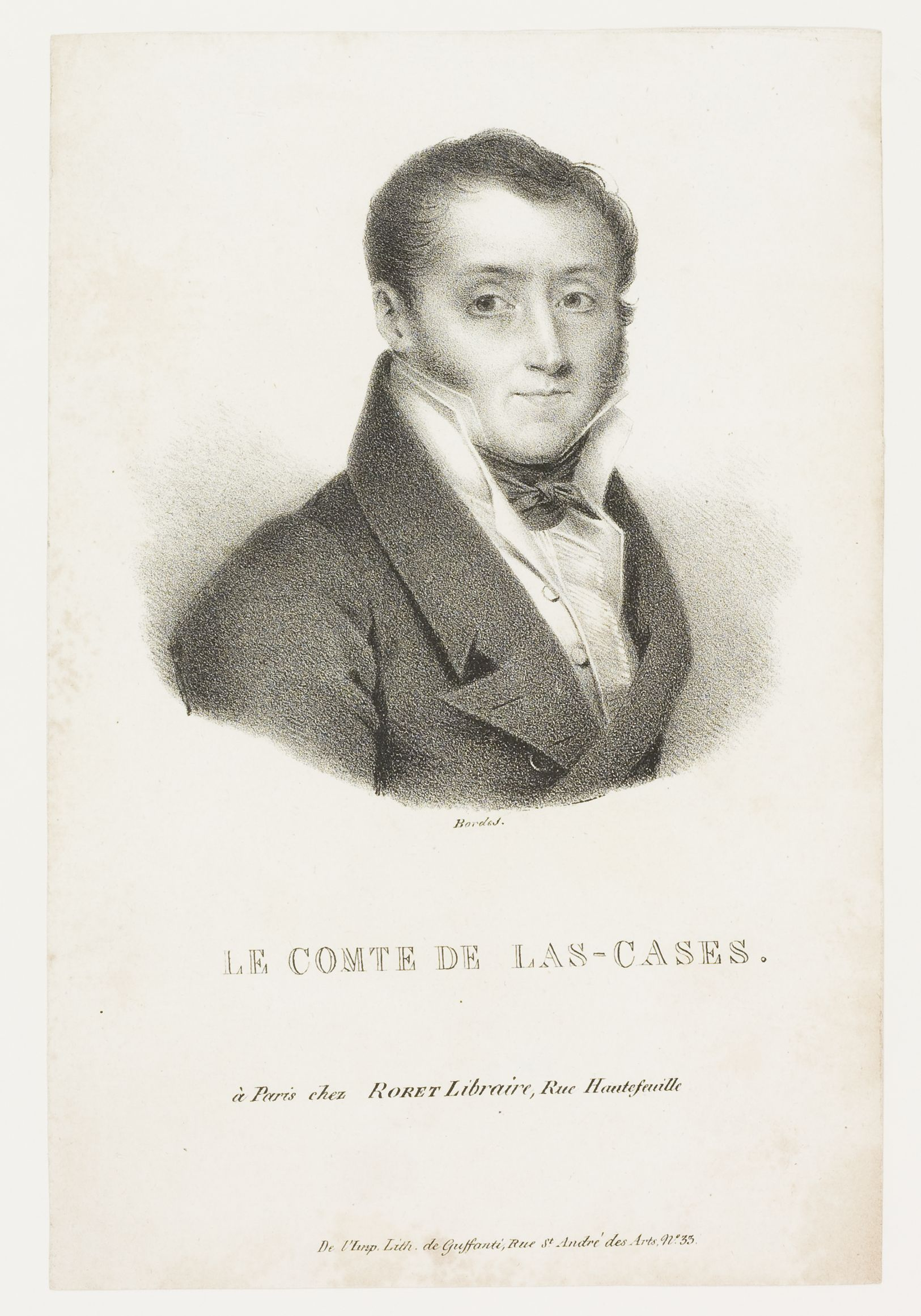
Emmanuel, comte de Las Cases

He was born at the castle of Las Cases near Revel in Languedoc. He was educated at the military schools of Vendôme and Paris. He entered the navy and took part in various engagements during the years 1781–1782. The outbreak of the Revolution in 1789 caused him to go into exile. He spent some years in Germany and England, participating in the disastrous Quiberon expedition (1795). He was one of the few survivors and returned to London, where he lived in poverty, until finding his vocation as a private tutor.

In 1801, in London and under the pseudonym, A. Lesage, he published in English the original edition of his famous atlas, which immediately proved a great success. Returning to Paris after the Peace of Amiens (1802), and having received amnesty, he issued the first French edition in 1803–1804, called Atlas historique, genealogique, chronologique et geographique de A. Lesage. Multiple editions, translations, spin-offs, several pirated, followed down to the 1850s. The atlas made Las Cases rich. It came to Napoleon's notice only when, in Las Cases's company, he went into exile on St Helena (1815).

The Peace of Amiens (1802) made provision for an amnesty for émigrés. Renouncing his hereditary title of marquis, Las Cases availed himself of this amnesty to repatriate himself. He returned to France during the Consulate with other royalists who rallied to the side of Napoleon, and stated afterwards to the emperor that he was conquered by his glory. Not until 1810 did he receive much notice from Napoleon's government, which then made him a chamberlain and created him a count of the empire. After the first abdication of the emperor (April 11, 1814), Las Cases retired to England, but returned to serve Napoleon during the Hundred Days.

The second abdication opened up for Las Cases the most noteworthy part of his career. He withdrew with the ex-emperor and a few other trusty followers to Rochefort. It was Las Cases who first proposed and strongly urged the emperor to throw himself on the generosity of the British nation. Las Cases made the first overtures to Captain Maitland of HMS Bellerophon and received a guarded reply, the nature of which he afterwards misrepresented.

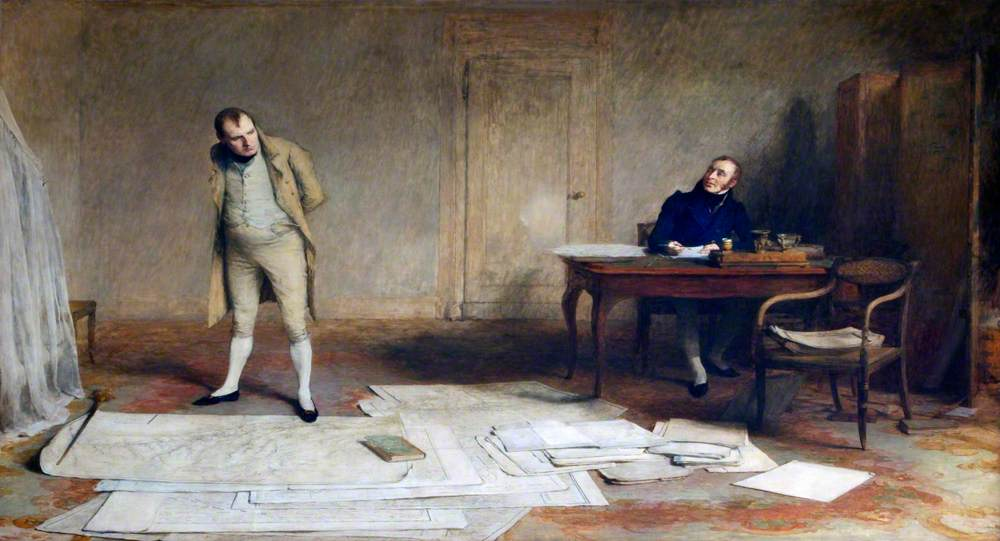
Napoleon dictating to Count Las Cases the account of his campaigns

Las Cases and his son accompanied the ex-emperor to Saint Helena. He then acted informally but very assiduously as his secretary, taking down numerous notes of his conversations, which thereafter took form in the famous Mémorial de Sainte-Hélène. The Mémorial should today be read with great caution, as the compiler did not hesitate to insert his own thoughts and to colour the expressions of his master. In some cases, he misstated facts and even fabricated documents. Pages corrected in the hand of Napoleon are in the Wisbech & Fenland Museum in Wisbech, England.

It is far less trustworthy than the record penned by Gaspard Gourgaud in his Journal. Disliked by Montholon and Gourgaud, Las Cases seems to have sought an opportunity to leave the island when he had accumulated sufficient literary material. However that may be, he infringed the British regulations in such a way as to lead to his expulsion by the governor, Sir Hudson Lowe (November 1816). He was sent first to the Cape of Good Hope and thence to Europe, but was not at first allowed by the government of Louis XVIII to enter France. He resided in Brussels. Having gained permission to come to Paris after the death of Napoleon, he took up residence there, published the Mémorial, and soon made a fortune from it.

In 1840, when the expedition set sail for St Helena to bring back Napoleon's remains, he was too ill to go, but his son who had shared his captivity was able to go. Las Cases died in 1842 at age 75, in Passy, and is buried in Passy Cemetery.

== See also ==
- François Carlo Antommarchi
- Château Léoville-Las Cases
- Napoleon, Emperor of the French
- The Memorial of Saint Helena
