= Pineau d'Aunis =

Variety of grape

Pineau d'Aunis (French pronunciation: [pino donis]; also known as Chenin noir [ʃənɛ̃ nwaʁ]) is a red French wine grape variety that is grown primarily in the Loire Valley around Anjou and Touraine.

A favorite of Henry Plantagenet, the English king had Pineau d'Aunis wine first brought to England in 1246. Today the grape is permitted in several Appellation d'origine contrôlée (AOC) wine regions of the Loire Valley, including Cheverny and Coteaux du Vendômois.

While a red wine grape, Pineau d'Aunis is often treated like Pinot noir and used to make rosé and white wines in both still and sparkling wine styles.

== History ==
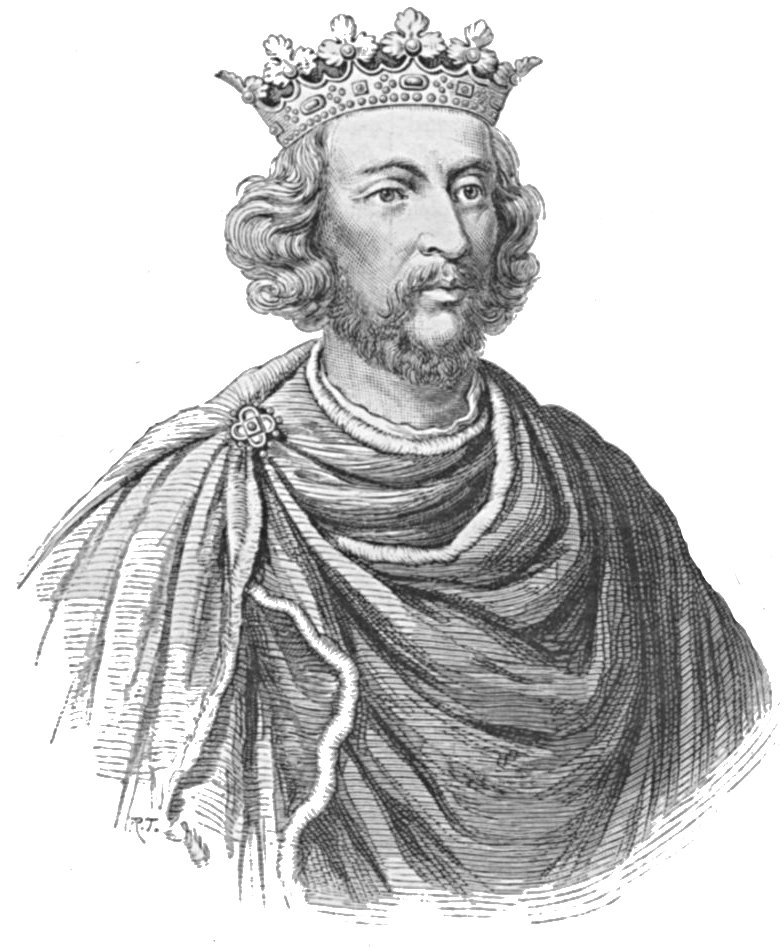
Pineau d'Aunis was reportedly a favorite wine of the English King Henry III who had the wine first brought to England in 1246.

The name Pineau comes from the French word pin and refers to the pine cone shape that clusters of grapes can resemble. It was first used to describe a grapevine growing in the Loire Valley in 1183 AD but whether or not this was Pineau d'Aunis is not known since Pineau has been a synonym used for Pinot noir, Chenin blanc and Menu Pineau (Arbois).

Aunis, within what is now the Charente-Maritime department, was a pays erected into a historical province, the smallest of France, in 1374; it was a fief of the Duchy of Aquitaine, brought to the English monarchy by Eleanor of Aquitaine. In Aunis the grape may have once been grown, but is currently not widely planted. However, wine writer Oz Clarke believes that the grape was named after a priory known as Aunis that existed outside of the commune of Saumur during the Middle Ages. Today what is left of the Aunis priory belongs to the Fontevraud Abbey in Chinon.

Author Michel Freyssinet speculates that Pineau d'Aunis may have originated in the Vendée region and was brought to the Loire region by salt merchants sailing up the Atlantic coast. According to Freyssinet, the vine was first planted in Chahaignes in what is now the Sarthe department of the Loire in the 9th century.

=== Middle Ages ===
The grape was known in England by the 13th century when it was a favorite wine of King Henry III of England. Henry, the son of John Plantagenet and Isabella of Angoulême (a commune is what is now the Charente department), began importing casks of Pineau d'Aunis wine to England in 1246. In England, the usually light colored Pineau d'Aunis was often blended with darker colored wines such as those made from red-fleshed teinturiers.

The wine that Henry imported was labeled as vin clairet, leaving wine writer Richard Kelley to presume that Pineau d'Aunis was the "original claret".

During the Hundred Years' War, King Charles VII of France gave Philip the Good, the Duke of Burgundy, vines of Pineau d'Aunis as a peace offering in 1425. Other accounts say that Charles' gift of Pineau d'Aunis was made to John VI, Duke of Brittany instead.

However, French author Henri Galinié challenges these claims as being no more than myths without robust factual evidence. He says that these are merely stories that have gained the status of facts through repetition. See his 56-page scholarly document specifically on the history of Pineau d'Aunis, published in 2014

=== 19th century to modern times ===
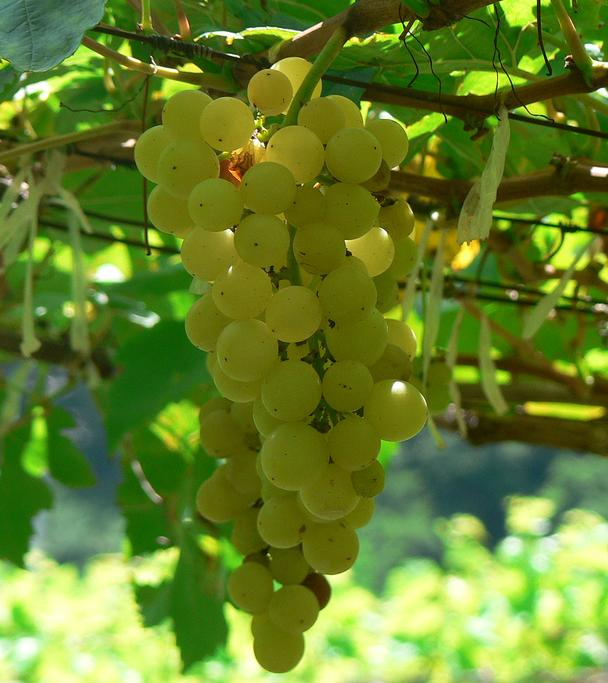
Though Pineau d'Aunis has been known as Chenin noir, it has no known relation with Chenin blanc. (pictured).

In 1816, André Jullien described Pineau d'Aunis as being widely grown throughout the Loire, particularly in the Loches commune of Touraine. In 1845, French ampelographer Alexandre-Pierre Odart described Pineau d'Aunis as Chenin noir which led to speculation that Chenin blanc, the notable Loire grape of Vouvray and Savennières, was a color mutation of Pineau d'Aunis. However, DNA testing in the early 21st century confirmed that Pineau d'Aunis is not related at all with Chenin blanc nor Pinot noir, with which it is frequently confused.

As with most French wine grapes, the phylloxera epidemic of the late 19th century drastically cut into the Pineau d'Aunis plantings in France. The construction of the Paris–Bordeaux railway as well as the 1980s high-speed expansion of the LGV Atlantique and the planned construction of the LGV Sud Europe Atlantique threaten to gobble up more plantings of Pineau d'Aunis but sparked some vignerons to launch conservation efforts to save the variety from extinction.

In 1958, there were 1,741 hectares (4,302 acres) of Pineau d'Aunis planted in France. Throughout the rest of the 20th century that number would steadily decline and by 2009 there were 435 hectares (1,075 acres) in France.

== Viticulture ==
Pineau d'Aunis is a mid-ripening variety that can produce very irregular yields with the quality of the resulting wine sharply diminished if yields become too excessive. Like the Pinot grapes, the vine produces small, compact bunches that can be highly susceptible to botrytis bunch rot, particularly in wet climates. Chlorosis is another viticultural hazards that can impact Pineau d'Aunis, inhibiting photosynthesis and leaving the leaves of the grapevine prone to sunburn and browning.

Wine writer Richard Kelley notes that Pineau d'Aunis is a "very terroir-sensitive" variety that will greatly reflect the vineyard soils and growing conditions that it experience. In soils with high limestone content, it can ripen very quickly which can limit the amount of phenolics and aromatic compounds that have time to develop. However, cooler soils with high clay content and high water capacity may retard the ripening too drastically.

The variety has a tendency to bud irregularly, depending on the climate. It will always bud after Chardonnay, Gamay and Pinot noir, and thus have much less risk of suffering from spring time frost, but will bud much earlier than Cabernet Franc. Depending on the vintage, Pineau d'Aunis will usually bud around 4 to 5 days before Chenin blanc followed by flowering at about the same time as Chenin.

Like Gamay, Pineau d'Aunis will develop thick, reddish-color stalks in the autumn with the leaves changing color to a bright red with purple/bluish veins.

=== Clones and rootstock ===
Currently, there are two clones of Pineau d'Aunis being widely propagated. Clone #289 which lends itself more to vin gris style wines and Clone #235. In recent years, some vignerons have been moving away from using clonal selections in lieu of using massale cuttings taken from a broad swath of vines from old "pre-clonal" vineyards with the aim of creating more genetic diversity in the vineyard.

Like many French grape varieties, plantings of Pineau d'Aunis from the 1960s onward were most often grafted onto SO4 rootstock (an interspecfic crossing of Vitis berlandieri and Vitis riparia). Given Pineau d'Aunis susceptibility to chlorosis, this rootstock did particularly well in vineyards with high calcium content in the soil. However, in most other soils, the rootstock propensity for increased vigor and creating excessive foliage created problems for the vine with canopy management and increase susceptibility to mildew and rot. In recent years, more vignerons have been turning to Riparia Gloire de Montpellier (derived only from Vitis riparia) rootstock.

== Wine regions ==
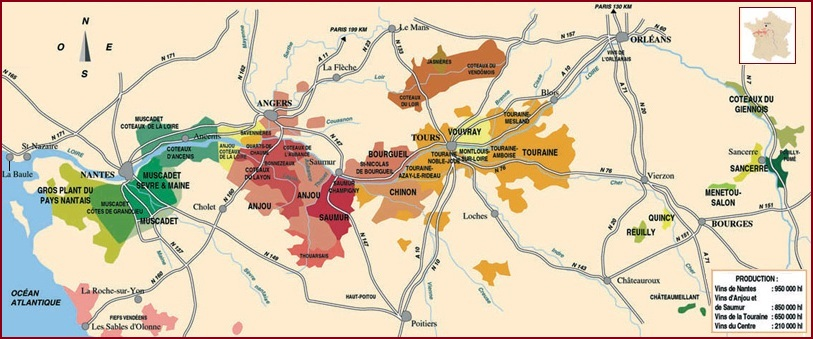
Pineau d'Aunis has been grown throughout the Loire Valley.

Historically Pineau d'Aunis has been grown throughout the Loire Valley and Centre-Val de Loire region of France with plantings in the Indre-et-Loire, Loir-et-Cher, Loiret, Maine-et-Loire, Sarthe and Vienne departments. Today it is most closely associated with the Anjou and Touraine region of the middle Loire where it is a permitted grape variety in several AOCs including Anjou, Saumur, Touraine, Valençay, Coteaux du Loir and Coteaux du Vendômois.

=== AOC regulations ===
In the Anjou AOC, Pineau d'Aunis can make up the blend for the general rouge wine along with Cabernet Franc, Cabernet Sauvignon and Gamay. Here the grapes are limited to harvest yields of no more than 40 hectoliters/hectare (approximately 2 tons/acre) with the finished wine needing to attain a minimum alcohol level of at least 10%. In the sparkling rosés of Anjou Mousseux it can be blended with the same grapes as the rouge, plus Groslot, with yields that can go up to 65 hl/ha (≈ 3.4 tons/acre) and a minimum alcohol level of 9.5%.

For both the reds and rosé of the Coteaux du Loir, based around the Loir tributary of the larger Loire river, Pineau d'Aunis is limited to harvest yields of 55 hl/ha (≈ 3 tons/acre) and is blended with Cabernet Franc and Malbec in a wine that must have at least 9% alcohol by volume.

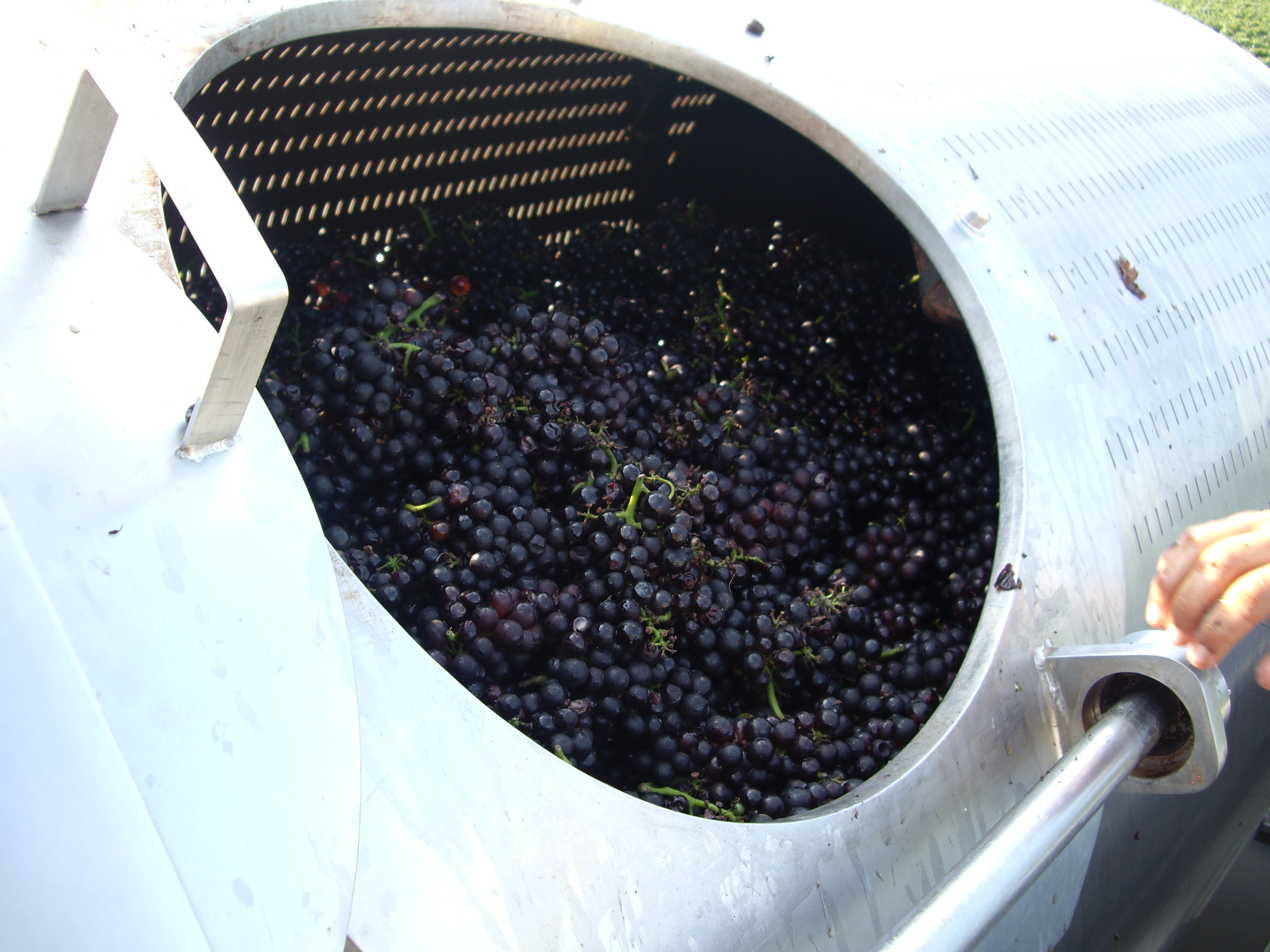
White wine can be made from the red Pineau d'Aunis grapes by pressing whole clusters of the grape (example with Pinot noir) quickly after harvest, leaving no time for skin contact that extracts the color compounds of the skins into the clear juice.

In the town of Vendôme in the Loir-et-Cher department, Pineau d'Aunis is made into a varietal wine of all colors (red, rosé and white) in Coteaux du Vendômois. The white AOC wine is made from whole cluster pressingof the grapes soon after harvest with no skin contact to extract color. Grapes for the red and rosé are limited by a maximum yield of 60 hl/ha (65 hl/ha for the white) with the finished wines having a minimum alcohol level of 9% (9.5% for the white).

For the sparkling rosé and white Crémant de Loire which spans the Loire Valley wine region, Pineau d'Aunis can be used in a blend with Chenin blanc, Cabernet Franc, Pinot noir, Groslot, Arbois and Chardonnay. For this AOC, yields for all wines are limited to 50 hl/ha with the wines having at least 9.5% alcohol by volume. For sparkling Saumur, Pineau d'Aunis is blended with most of the same varieties as Crémant de Loire (with Sauvignon blanc and Malbec instead of Arbois and Gamay permitted for the sparkling red and rosés) but yields are allowed to go up to 60 hl/ha though the wine needs to meet the same minimum alcohol. In Touraine, the sparkling cépage allows Pineau d'Aunis to be blended with any of the varieties used in both Saumur and Crémant de Loire under the same minimum alcohol restrictions but with an even higher yield allowance of 65 hl/ha.

Pineau d'Aunis is also permitted in the red and rosé of the Saumur AOC where it is blended with both Cabernet grapes as well as Groslot. Similar to the greater Anjou AOC, yields are restricted to 40 ha/hla with a minimum alcohol level of 10%. In the red wine-only sub region of Saumur-Champigny, Pineau d'Aunis is only blended with the Cabernet varieties but with the same maximum yield and minimum alcohol restrictions.

In the general Touraine AOC, the Pineau d'Aunis is limited to harvest yields of 55 hl/ha and can be blended with Cabernet Sauvignon, Cabernet Franc, Gamay, Malbec, Pinot noir, Groslot and Pinot gris in the red and rosé wines of the AOC. The minimum alcohol level for these wines much reach at least 9%.

Along the river Cher, Pineau d'Aunis is grown in the Valençay AOC where it is blended with the Cabernet varieties, Malbec and Gamay in the red and rosé wines. Grapes are restricted to yields of 45 hl/ha with a minimum 9% alcohol by volume.

== Styles ==
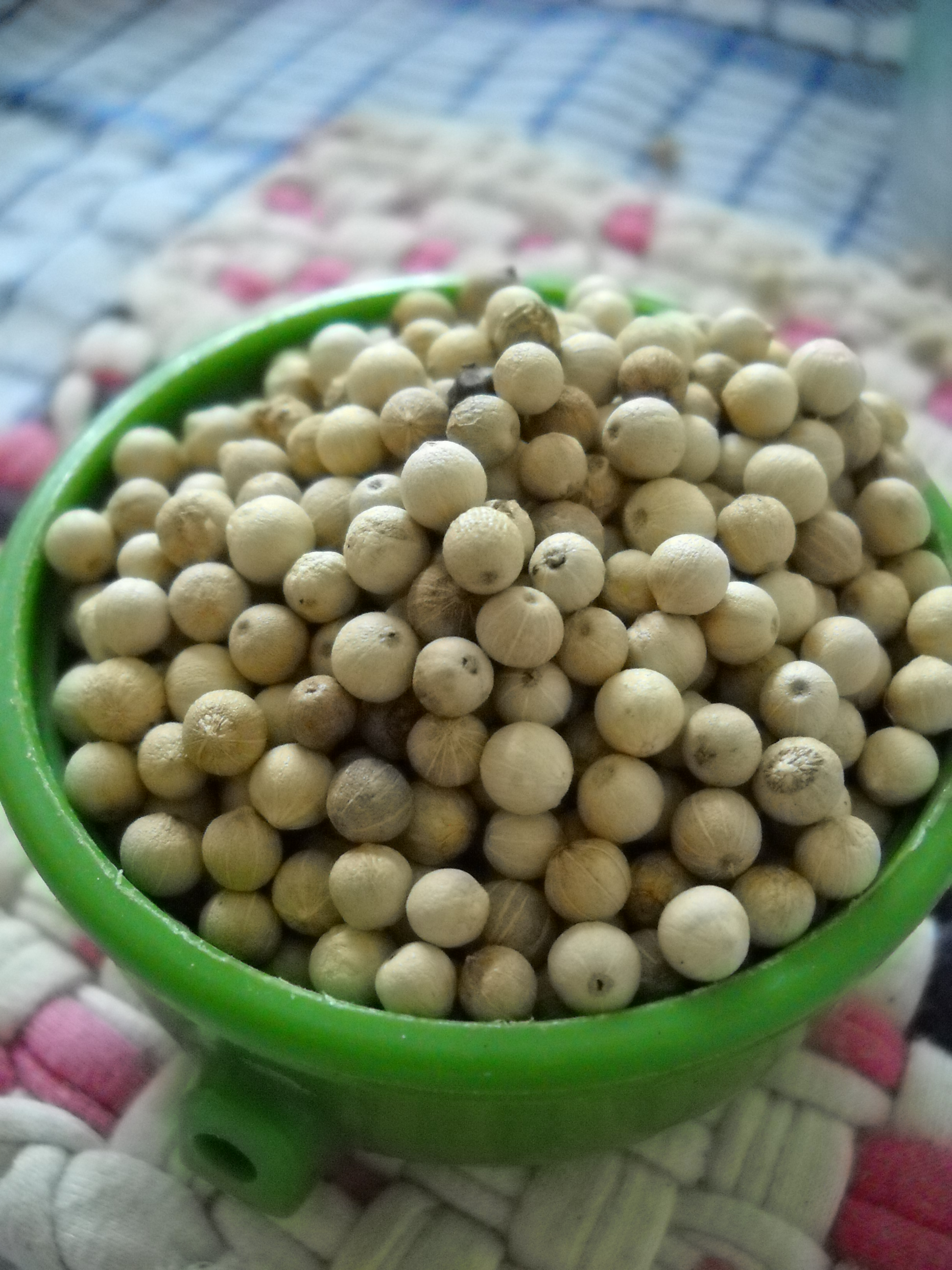
White pepper is a classic aroma note associated with Pineau d'Aunis wines.

Pineau d'Aunis can be made into a wide range of wine styles from red, rosé to white and in both still and sparkling styles. According to Master of Wine Jancis Robinson, Pineau d'Aunis as a red wine tends to produce slightly tannic wines and with all styles can contribute noticeable acidity and white pepper notes.

Richard Kelley notes that the quality of varietal Pineau d'Aunis will depend heavily on the type of yields that the grape was harvested at, as well as the age of the vines. Well made examples of red Pineau d'Aunis from favorable vintages will have the characteristic white pepper note of the variety as cherry, raspberry and strawberry fruit flavor and sometimes kirsch and confit notes. Long, slow fermentations at cool temperatures (around 20 °C/68 °F) will help to extract aromas that don't stray "baked" fruit flavors. The low phenolics and anthocyanin content can make color extraction difficult, though this can be enhanced with both blending as well as "bleeding off" (saignée) some of the juice to more concentrate the must.

== Synonyms ==
Over the years Pineau d'Aunis has been known under a variety of synonyms including: Aunis (in Loir-et-Cher), Brune Noir, Chenin Noir (in some parts of the Loire Valley and California), Côt á Bourgeon blanc, Côt á Queue Rouge, Gros Pineau, Gros Véronais, Kek Chenin, La Brune Noire, Mançais Noir, Pineau, Pinot d´Aunis, Plant d´Aunis (in Loir-et-Cher and Maine-et-Loir), Plant de Mayet (in Sarthe) and Shenen nor.
