= Vouvray (wine) =

French wine region in the Loire Valley

A sparkling Vouvray made from Chenin blanc

Vouvray (French pronunciation: [vuvʁɛ]) is a French wine region in the Loire Valley located in the Touraine district just east of the city of Tours in the commune of Vouvray. The Appellation d'origine contrôlée (AOC) is dedicated almost exclusively to Chenin blanc; the obscure and minor grape Arbois is permitted but rarely used.

Wine production in this area is highly variable and dependent on climate conditions. Cooler years promote the production of dry (sec) and sparkling Vouvray, while a warmer, more favourable vintage encourages the production of sweet moelleux or liquoreux styles produced by noble rot in a manner similar to the sweet dessert wines of Sauternes. With the naturally high acidity of Chenin blanc, Vouvrays from favourable vintages have immense aging potential. A few wines drink well into 100 years of age, but it is more common to find a well aged Vouvray peaking at the 40 year mark. Across the Loire River from Vouvray is the Montlouis AOC, which produces Chenin blanc-based wines like Vouvray that tend to have less acidity and concentration of flavour.

== History ==
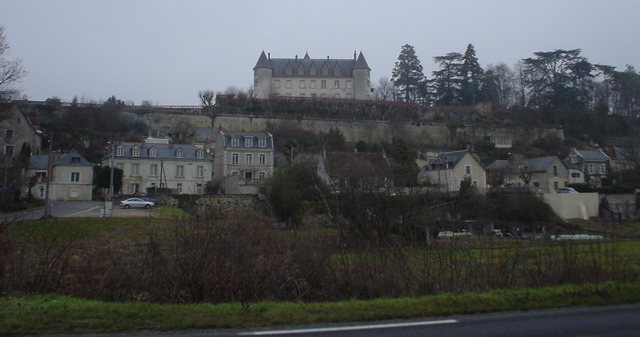
Viticulture has existed around the village of Vouvray since at least the Middle Ages

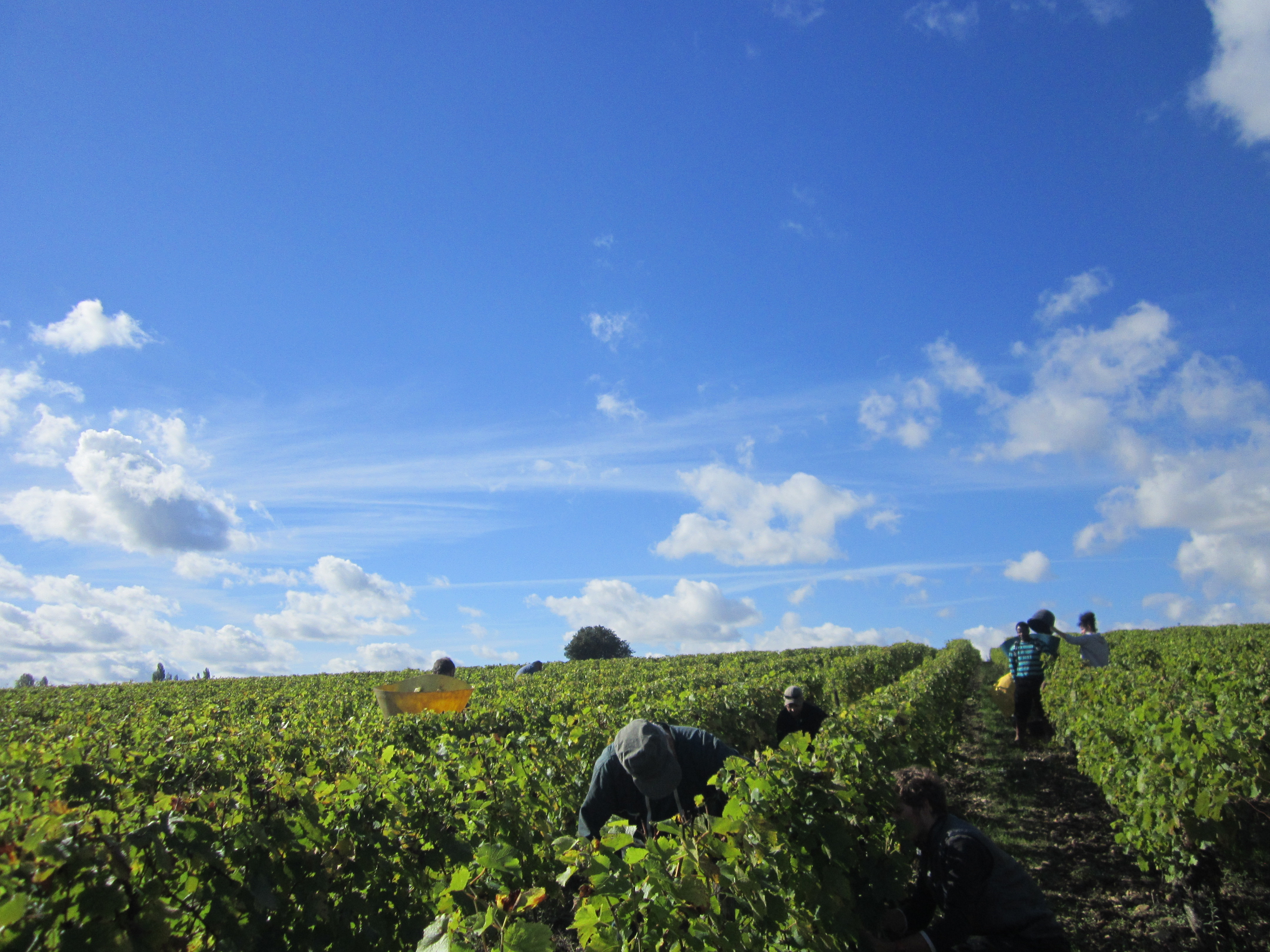
Hand harvest in Vouvray (domaine François PINON)

Viticulture has existed in Vouvray since at least the Middle Ages when the Catholic Church maintained vineyards at the local monasteries. The Chenin blanc grape, known locally as Pineau de la Loire, is believed to have originated in the Anjou wine region sometime in the 9th century and from there eventually migrated to Vouvray. In the 16th and 17th century, Dutch merchants oversaw the plantings of many vineyards in the area to be used for wine trade with markets in London, Paris and Rotterdam. Grapes from all over Touraine were brought together in a mass blending labeled simply as "Vouvray". Wine cellars were built in the region from caves created from the excavation of tuffeau rocks used to build the Châteaux of the Loire Valley. The cold, steady temperature of these cellars served ideal for the advancement of sparkling wines made according to the traditional méthode champenoise that became popular in the 18th and 19th century. In 1936 Vouvray was created as an Appellation d'origine contrôlée (AOC). The boundaries of the AOC were defined around the village of Vouvray and seven nearby villages. Included among these villages were Chançay, Nouzilly, Vernou-sur-Brenne and Rochecorbon.

== Climate and geography ==
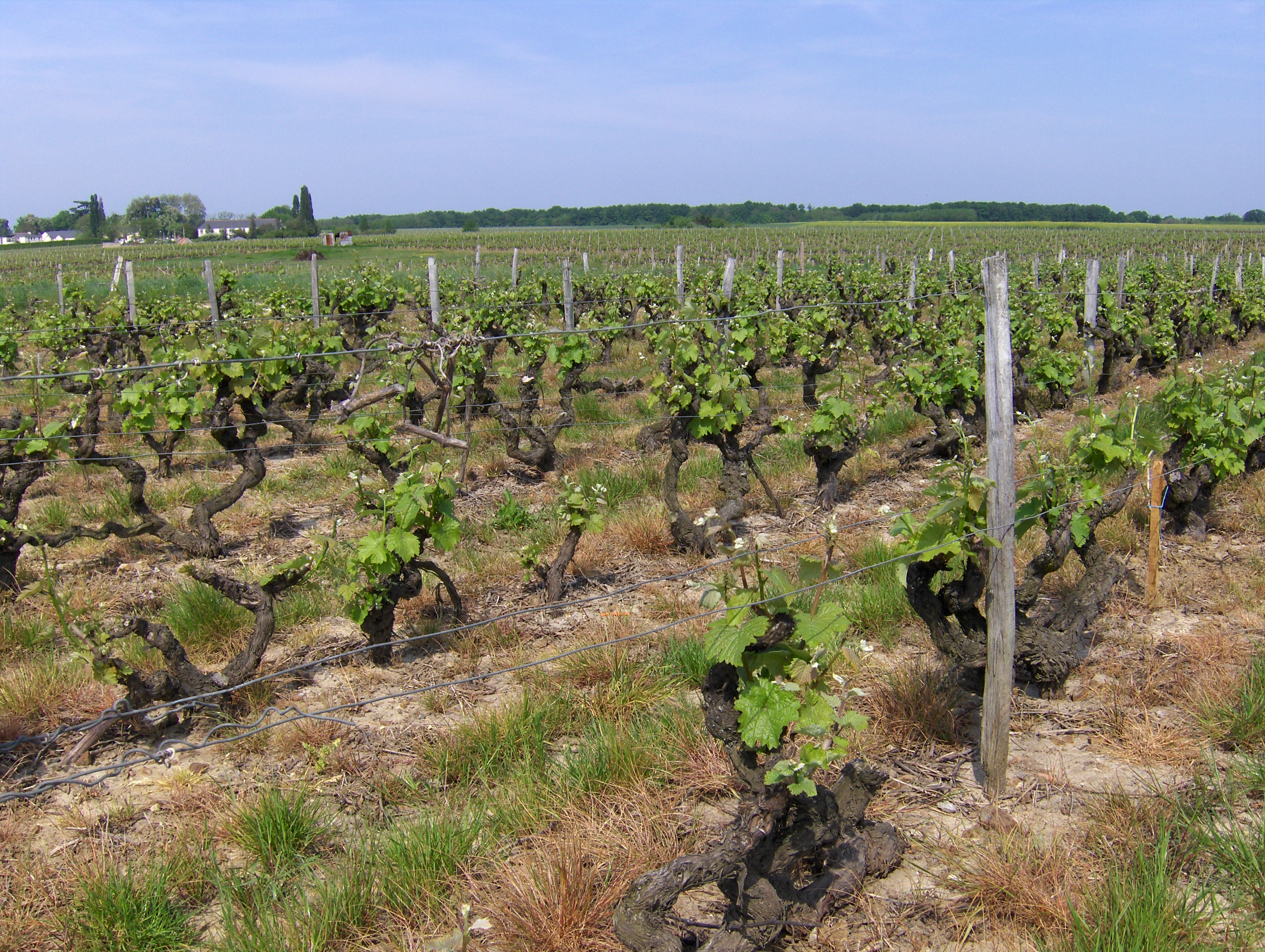
Vineyards in Vouvray are planted with a southerly aspect on a plateau.

Located along the right bank of the river Loire east of the city of Tours, the Vouvray region is situated on top a plateau that is dissected by small streams and tributaries of the Loire such as the river Cisse and its tributary the Brenne. These streams contribute to the unique climate conditions that promote the development of the Botrytis cinerea fungus that causes the noble rot used to produce sweet dessert style wines. The climate of the region is mostly continental with some maritime influence from the Atlantic Ocean located more than 160 kilometres (100 mi) to the west. Wine production in the region is highly dependent on the climate with significant vintage variation expressed year due to the variable climate. Cooler climate years shift the bulk of production towards drier styles of wine including sparkling Vouvray. More warmer climate years promote the production of sweeter, dessert style wines.

The northern location and relatively cooler climate combines to make harvest in Vouvray one of the last to be completed in France, often lasting into November. Vineyards are usually planted on the plateau above the river bank in soils composed of gravel and clay on top of tuffeau.

== Viticulture and winemaking ==
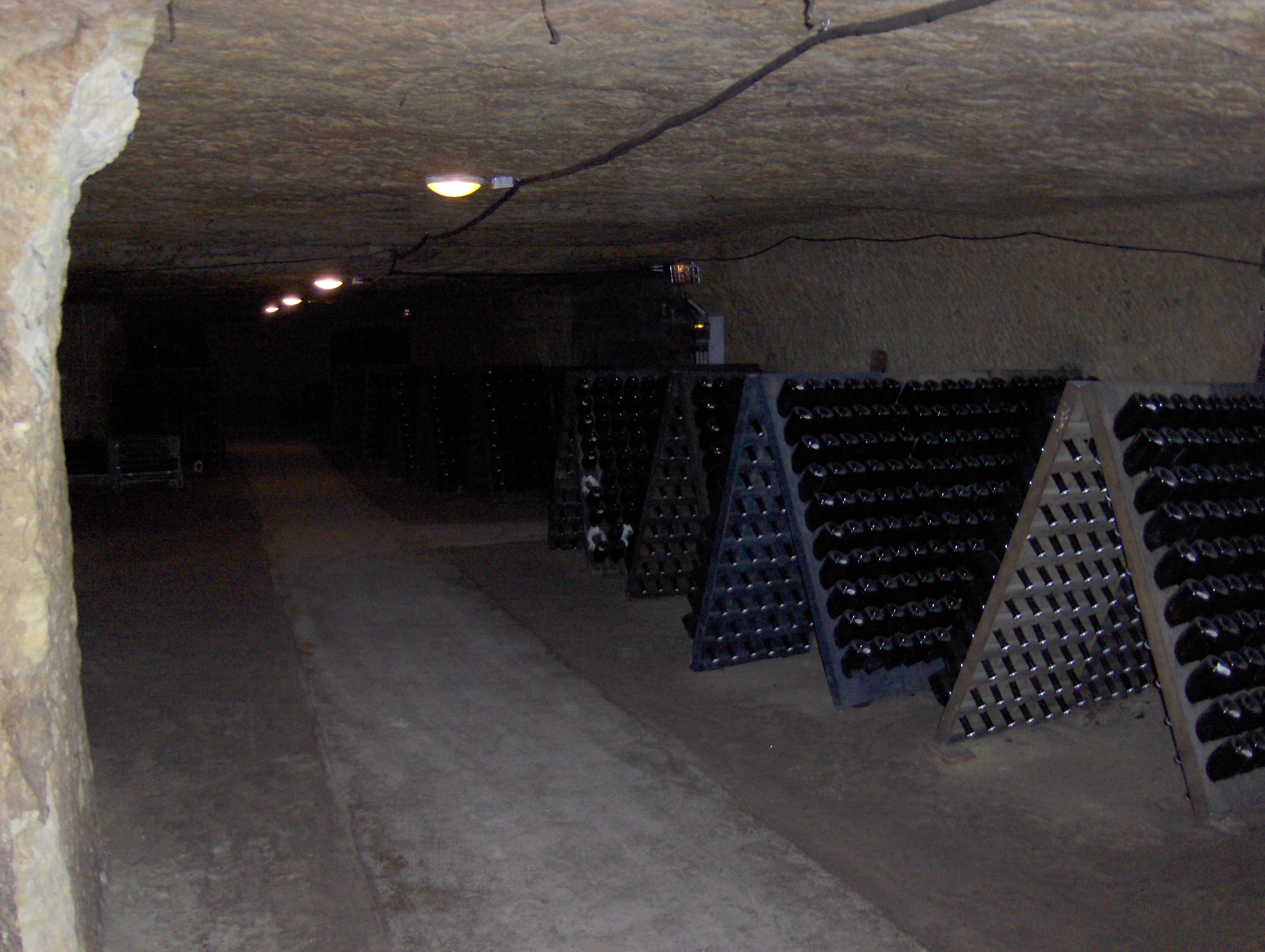
Excavated caves carved into the tuffeau soils are often converted into wine cellars that offer consistent, cool temperatures ideal for sparkling wine production and aging wine.

Chenin blanc is the dominant and nearly exclusive grape of Vouvray. While the obscure minor grape Arbois is permitted in the Vouvray AOC, it is rarely seen. With more than 2,000 ha (5,000 acres) of vineyards planted as of 2006, it is the single largest producer of Chenin blanc-based wines in France by a sizable margin, with only the Anjou wine region of the Coteaux du Layon coming close. Most of the vineyards are planted on a plateau with a southern aspect facing towards the river. Viticulture and wine production in the region is dictated almost completely by the climate characteristics of a particular vintage with cooler climate years shifting productions towards dry and sparkling wines while warmer vintages seeing increased production of sweet and even botrytized wines. The harvest in Vouvray is often the last in France to be completed, potentially lasting until November. When sweet and botrytized wine are being produced, the harvest is often very labor-intensive, involving successive tries or passages through the vineyards with harvesters hand-picking only the ripest berries.

Vouvray produces more than a million cases of wine a year. The traditional style of winemaking in Vouvray is a minimalist approach, often using neutral fermentation vessel such as stainless steel and not submitting the wine to malolactic fermentation. While some winemakers are experimenting with oak, very few wines are made with new oak. Vouvrays are usually bottled early and expected to age in the wine bottle. Sparkling wines are made according to the traditional method and can either be pétillant (semi-sparkling) or mousseux (fully sparkling).

== Wines and styles ==
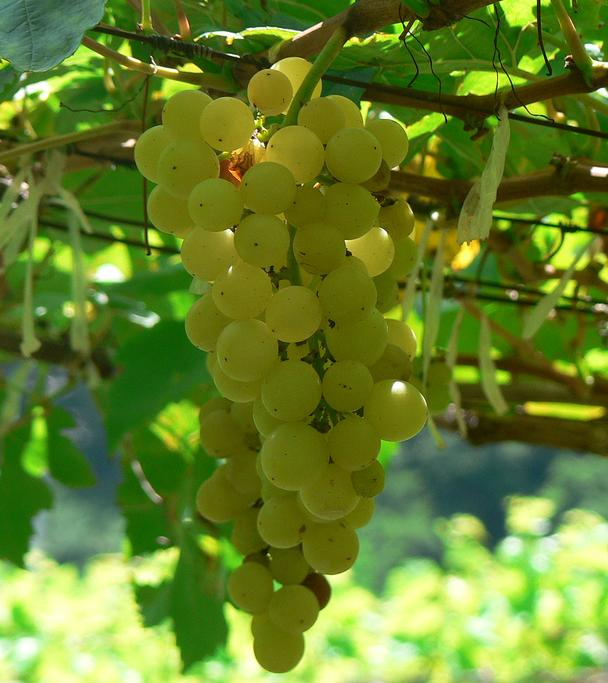
Chenin blanc is the dominant grape of Vouvray.

The Chenin blanc wines of Vouvray are characterized by the grape's natural high acidity. The perception of that acidity and style of wine will be determined based on the balance of sugar in the wine. Dry or sec styles will have more noticeable acidity than the sweeter demi-sec and moelleux. The acidity is also a key component to the wine's aging ability. Depending on the style, Vouvrays can exhibit notes of honey, nuts, ginger, fig, apples and white flowers. Vouvrays are often paired with rich, hearty dishes and flavourful sauces.

=== Sweetness levels ===
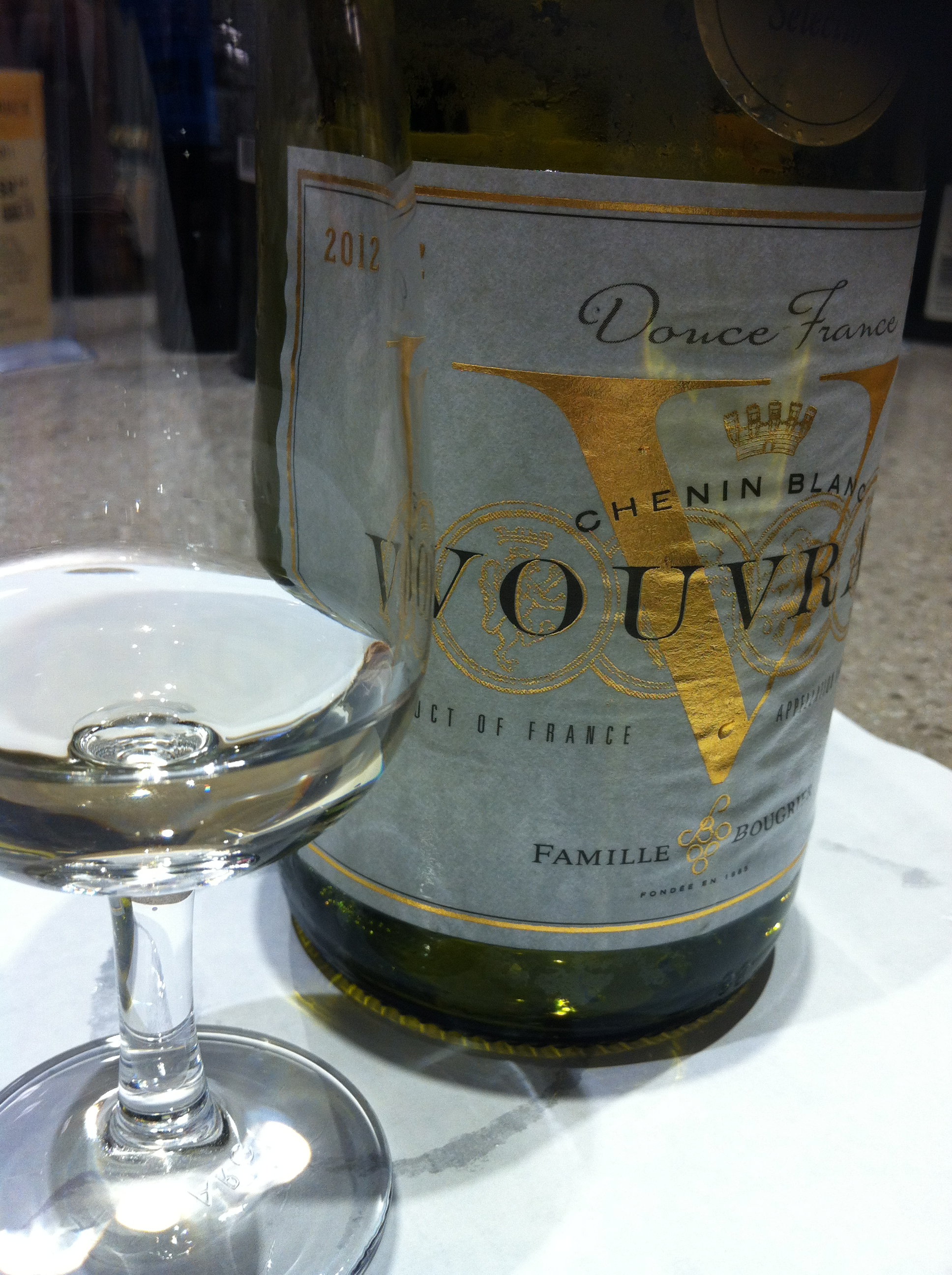
This is a Vouvray whose label states the grape (Chenin blanc), but does not indicate the exact sweetness level. Nonetheless, the phrase "Douce France" (sweet France) may give a clue about the wine style.

As Vouvray can be made in a wide range of sweetness styles, the wine labels may indicate the sweetness level by the terms Sec, Demi-Sec, Moelleux and Doux. While these terms are not strictly defined, they tend to roughly fall into the guidelines below. Note that the residual sugar level may not equate to the level of sweetness that a taster will perceive in the wine due to balance of acidity in the wine. In some cases a producer's Demi-Sec wine may taste drier than their Sec. Sparkling Vouvray may also have the sweetness level indicated on the label.

- Sec The driest level with 0-0.4% (less than 4 grams per litre) residual sugar. Sometimes producers will specify their bone dry wines as Sec-Sec or "dry dry" and their slightly less dry wines as Sec-tendres or "gently dry".
- Demi-Sec An "off dry" style with between 0.4-1.2% (4 to 12 grams per litre) of residual sugar.
- Moelleux A sweet, often botrytized style with 1.2-4.5% (12 to 45 grams per litre) of residual sugar. The term Moelleux is French for "mellow".
- Doux The sweetest style with more than 4.5% (45 grams per litre) of residual sugar. The term liquoreux or "liquor-like" may appear on the label to describe the almost syrupy sweet nature.

=== Aging ===
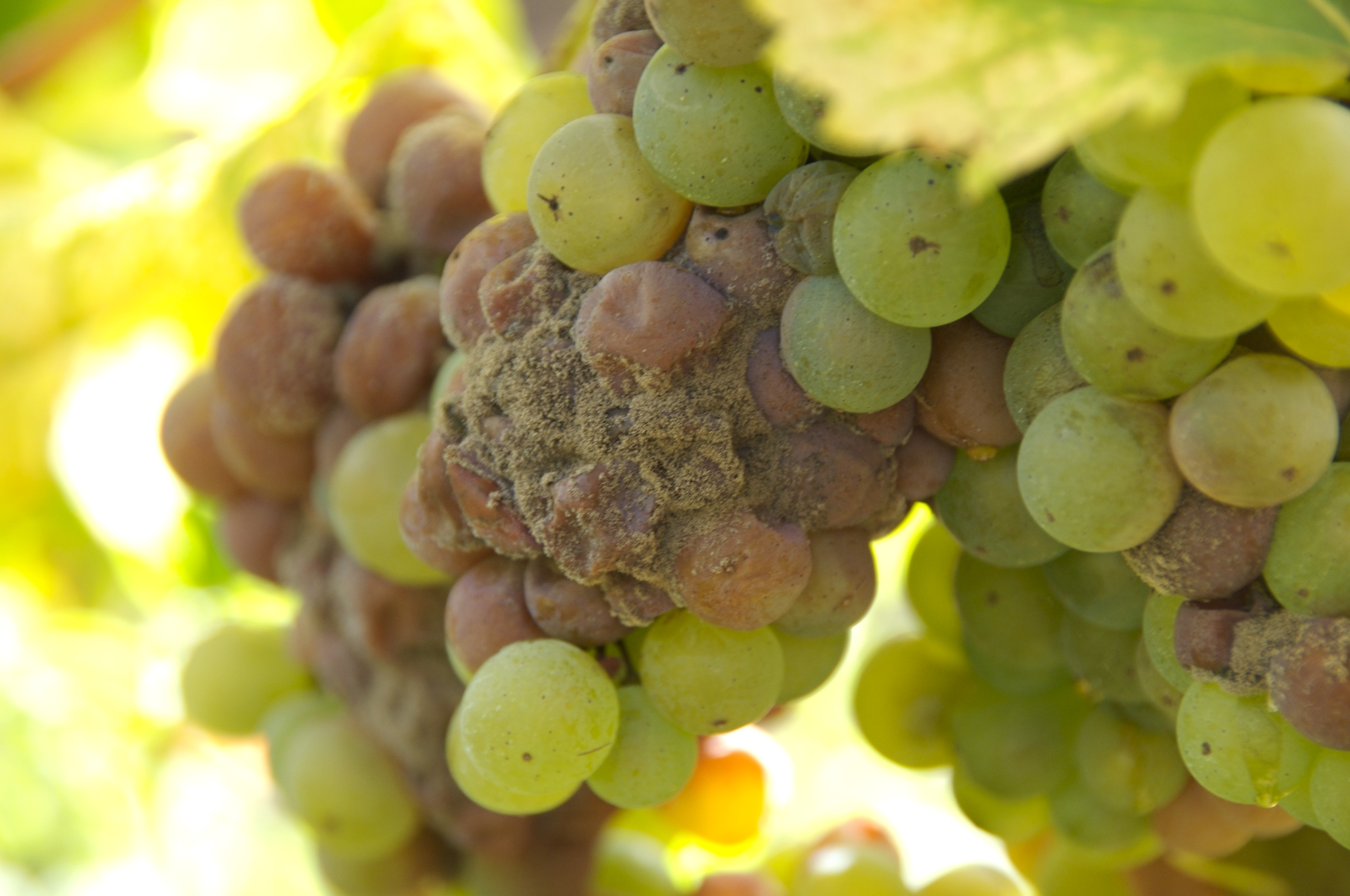
In favourable vintages, when the climate conditions encourage the development of noble rot (example pictured), the sweet wine styles of Vouvray will often have immense aging potential and longevity.

Vouvrays are known for their longevity and aging potential, particularly if the vintage was favourable. Some wines, most notably the sweeter Moelleux styles, have the potential to age and develop in the bottle for several decades to a century. While modern producers are contributing to making examples more approachable to drink while young, some premium examples still made in the traditionally high acid style will often need 3 to 7 years of bottle age before the acidity tones down. Dry or Sec examples from favourable vintages can have the potential to age for 15–20 years or more but many are ready to drink within 4 or 5 years after vintage. Sparkling Vouvrays tend not to have the same aging potential as their still wine counterparts or vintage dated Champagne and are usually meant to be consumed within 3 years of vintage or, for non-vintage bottling, soon after purchase.

In 2005 Decanter Magazine conducted a compilation of the "100 Greatest Wines" ever made. A 1947 Vouvray (considered a favourable year by many critics) from the producer S.A. Huet was ranked #6 on this listing—the second-highest ranking for any white wine behind only the 1921 vintage of Chateau d'Yquem.
