= Arbois (disambiguation) =

Arbois is a commune in the Jura department in eastern France. It may also refer to:

- Arbois (grape), French white wine grape variety
- Arbois AOC, viticultural appellation among the Jura wine regions
