= Touraine AOC =

Appellation d'Origine Contrôlée (AOC)

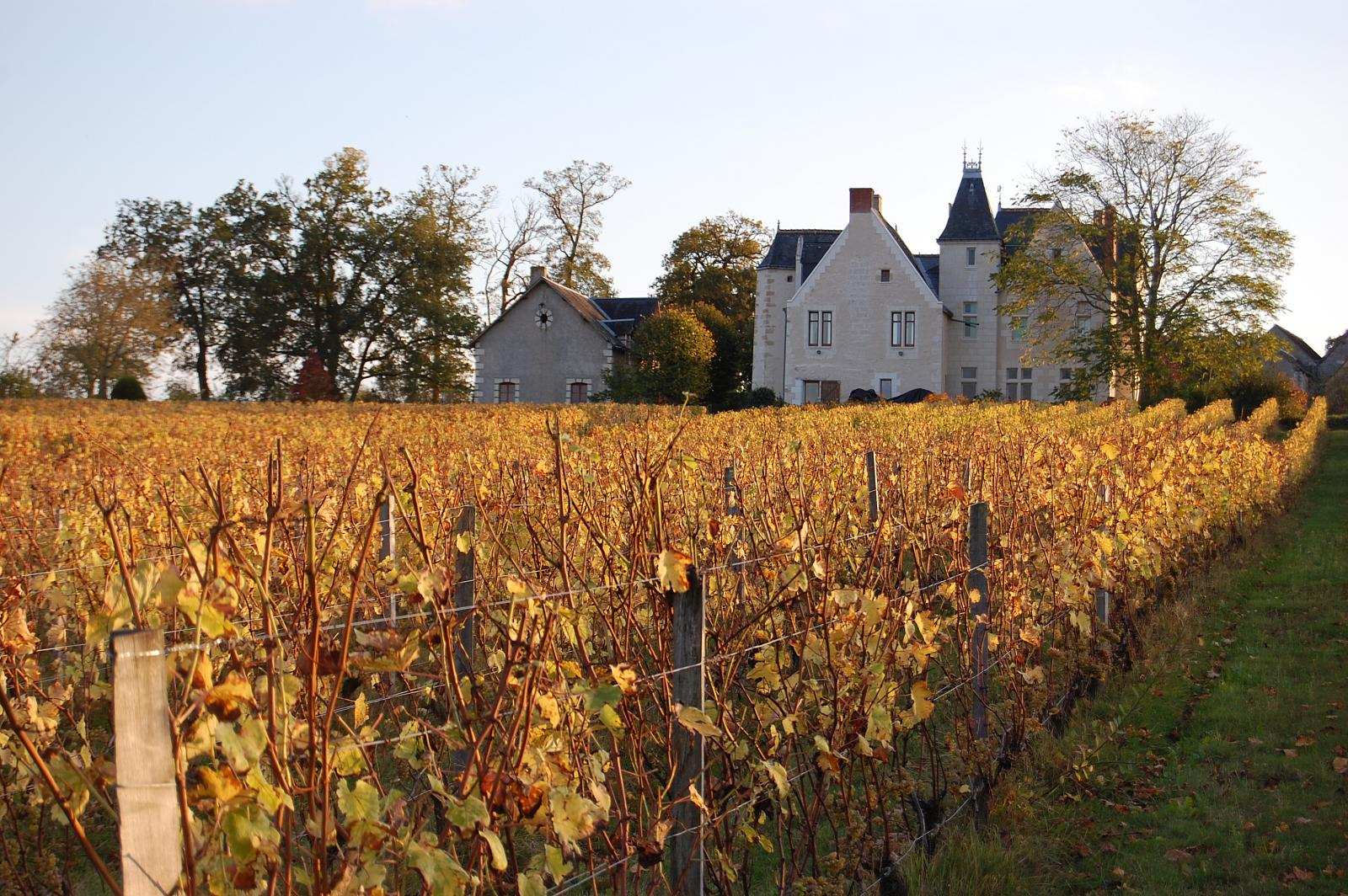
Vendanges Chateau La-Roche

Touraine (French pronunciation: [tuʁɛn]) is an Appellation d'Origine Contrôlée (AOC) in the Loire Valley wine region in France that produce dry white wines and red wines rich in tannins. The AOC status was awarded by a decree of December 24, 1939 (modified by the decree of August 29, 2002). The wine-growing area extends over 5,300 hectares (13,000 acres) across the départements of Indre-et-Loire, Indre and Loir-et-Cher. Touraine AOC comprises a total of 70 communes, it is thus a "subregional" appellation covering the same area as a number of smaller local AOCs.

== Grape varieties ==
The white wines are made from Chenin blanc grapes (known locally as Pineau Blanc de la Loire), and from Sauvignon blanc and Arbois grapes. The white Touraine wines are dry, fairly firm, lively and full, and keep well when bottled. The sparkling wines are allowed to use the designation "Touraine mousseux" (sparkling Touraine wine), which can include a wider range of grapes, including Chardonnay.

The red wines are produced from Cabernet Franc, Cabernet Sauvignon, Malbec (known locally as Côt), Pinot noir, Pinot Meunier, Pinot gris, Pineau d'Aunis and Gamay grape varieties (Gamay is used only for wines marketed in the first year after production). These wines are flavoursome and tannic in character. Touraine wines sold in the first year of production are light and fruity, as well as rustic.

The rosé wines are made from Cabernet Franc, Sauvignon, Côt, Pinot noir, Pinot Meunier, Pinot gris, Pineau d'Aunis, Gamay and Grolleau grape varieties. These wines are dry.

== Appellations and designation ==
The best known designations within Touraine AOC, and separate appellations in this subregion, are:

- Touraine: this is the appellation known simply as "Touraine" and covering the entire subregion. Its land borders the Loire river, stretching from the Sologne region to the borders of Vienne and Anjou. The wine officially designated "Touraine primeur " (Touraine wine marketed in the first year after production) is made exclusively from the Gamay noir à Jus blanc grape variety.
- Touraine-Amboise: this appellation covers ten communes located on the outskirts of Amboise. The red and rosé wines are produced from the grape varieties, Cabernet Franc (known locally as "Breton"), Cabernet Sauvignon, Côt and Gamay noir, while the white wines (dry, medium-dry and medium-sweet) are made from Chenin blanc (known locally as Pineau de la Loire).
- Touraine Mesland: the small village of Mesland, which lies between Amboise and Blois, gives its name to red, rosé and white wines of considerable finesse produced from Gamay grapes, and to white wines produced from Chenin grapes.
- Touraine Azay-le-Rideau: located in the wine-growing area surrounding the Château of Azay-le-Rideau, this village gives its name to white wines produced from Chenin grapes and to rosé wines produced from Chenin, Gamay and Grolleau grapes.
- Bourgueil: lying to the north of the Loire river, between Chinon and Saumur, the Bourgueil region is one of the largest wine-growing areas of Touraine. This is the Cabernet Franc country, the region straddles the Touraine and Anjou regions. Depending on the nature of the soil, two different kinds of wine grow alongside each other within the Bourgueil appellation area. Wines from fine gravel soils, must be drunk when very young, while wines from calcareous tuffeau soils develop their flavours and aromas a year later. Bourgueil wines age well for a very long time.
- Saint-Nicolas-de-Bourgueil: very close to the Bourgueil wine-growing area in terms of distance, but a world away in terms of its wines, is the village of Saint-Nicolas-de-Bourgueil. The wines produced here are of exceptional quality and their reputation extends far beyond France. These wines, which have very strong red fruit flavours, can be drunk in their first year, but improve with every passing year and can be kept very successfully for more than ten years.
- Chinon: these wines are often better known than the Saint-Nicolas-de-Bourgueil wines (perhaps because the village itself is so well known), and are less fruity. The wines of Chinon are indissolubly linked to the literary output of Rabelais (a famous French Renaissance writer), the most famous person to have sung their praises.
- Vouvray: another great name with an international reputation, dating from the time of Saint Martin of Tours himself, who is thought to have initiated wine-growing in this area. Balzac (a famous 19th century French novelist) pays tribute to this wine in his writing. Lying to the east of Tours and situated on the right bank of the Loire, the Vouvray region produces white wines only. Some Vouvray wines are semi-sparkling or sparkling. In a cellar with good storage conditions, Vouvray wines can be kept for 40 years. In Touraine, in fact, it is not uncommon for Vouvray to replace Champagne at meals marking special occasions.
- Montlouis: located only a few kilometres to the east of Tours, Montlouis-sur-Loire gives its name to white wines that are less well known outside of the Touraine region and are all made from Chenin Blanc grapes. The Montlouis-sur-Loire (or "Montlouis") wine-growing area was originally part of the Vouvray region, but lay on the left bank of the Loire on somewhat different soil. It was in 1938 that Montlouis-sur-Loire became an AOC (quality-controlled designation of origin) wine with an appellation that was independent from that of Vouvray. In parallel with the Vouvray wines, some Montlouis wines are semi-sparkling or sparkling, and in 2007 the term pétillant originel was added to distinguish sparkling wines made in the pétillant naturel (ancestral method) style.

== See also ==
- List of vins de primeur
