= Parçay-Meslay =

- Commune
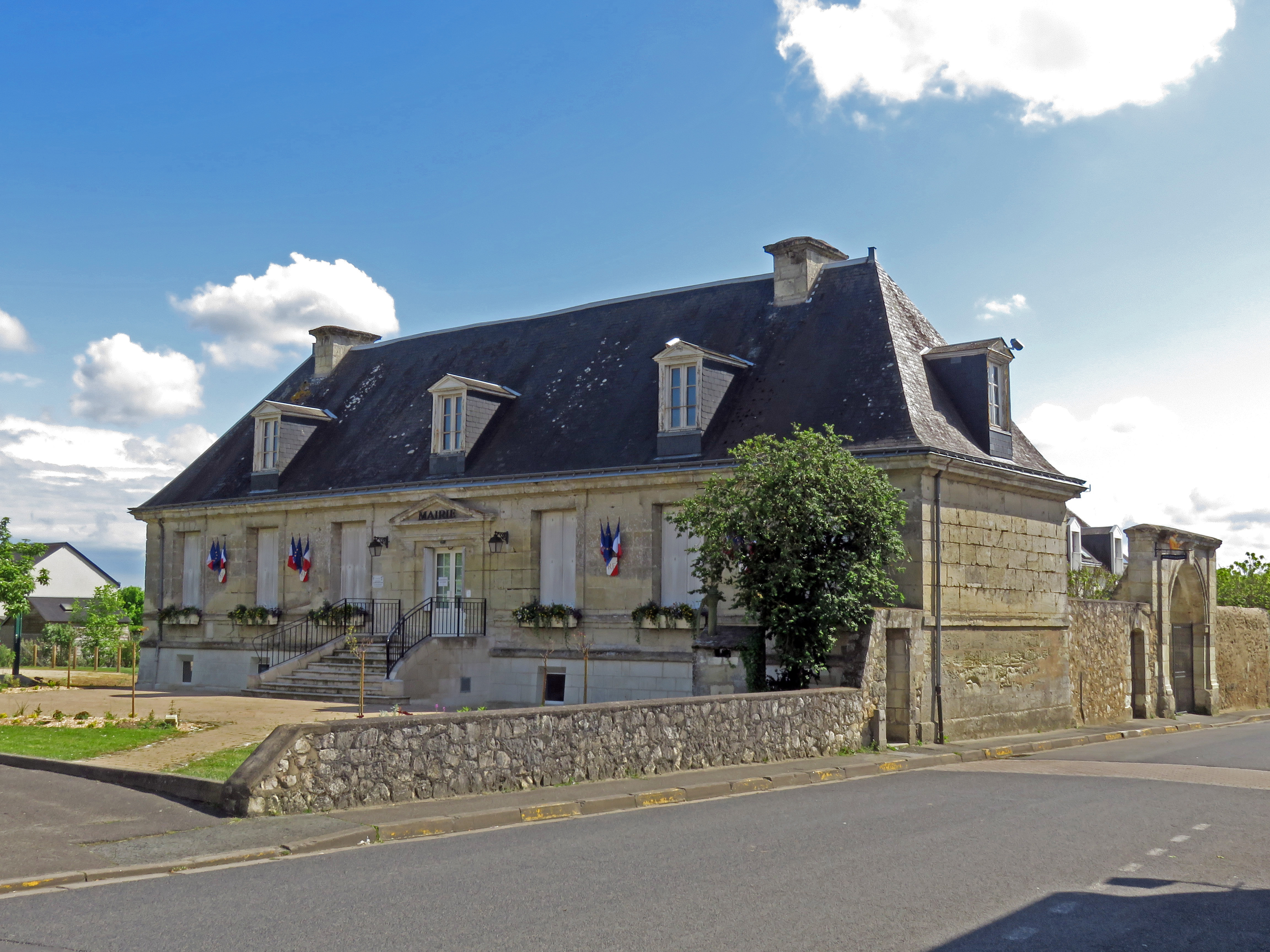
- Town hall

- Coat of arms
- Location of Parçay-Meslay
- Location within France Location within Centre-Val de Loire
- Coordinates: 47°26′33″N 0°44′47″E
- Country: France
- Region: Centre-Val de Loire
- Department: Indre-et-Loire
- Arrondissement: Tours
- Canton: Vouvray
- Intercommunality: Tours Métropole Val de Loire

Government
  - Mayor (2020–2026): Bruno Fenet
- Area^{1}: 14.07 km^{2} (5.43 sq mi)
- Highest elevation: 122 m (400 ft)
- Lowest elevation: 74 m (243 ft)
- Population (2023): 2,574
  - Density: 182.9/km^{2} (473.8/sq mi)
- Time zone: UTC+01:00 (CET)
  - Summer (DST): UTC+02:00 (CEST)
- INSEE/Postal code: 37179 /37210
- ^{1} French Land Register data, which excludes lakes, ponds, glaciers > 1 km^{2} (0.386 sq mi or 247 acres) and river estuaries.

Parçay-Meslay (French pronunciation: [paʁsɛ mɛlɛ]) is a commune in the Indre-et-Loire department, central France.

== Population ==
Historical population

Year	Pop.	±% p.a.
1793	510	—
1800	495	−0.43%
1806	505	+0.33%
1821	536	+0.40%
1831	538	+0.04%
1836	555	+0.62%
1841	601	+1.61%
1846	606	+0.17%
1851	603	−0.10%
1856	606	+0.10%
1861	559	−1.60%
1866	583	+0.84%
1872	576	−0.20%
1876	592	+0.69%
1881	595	+0.10%
1886	637	+1.37%
1891	598	−1.26%
1896	586	−0.40%
1901	611	+0.84%

Year	Pop.	±% p.a.
1906	598	−0.43%
1911	554	−1.52%
1921	529	−0.46%
1926	572	+1.58%
1931	620	+1.62%
1936	662	+1.32%
1946	629	−0.51%
1954	628	−0.02%
1962	654	+0.51%
1968	781	+3.00%
1975	1,112	+5.18%
1982	1,538	+4.74%
1990	1,757	+1.68%
1999	2,198	+2.52%
2007	2,340	+0.79%
2012	2,301	−0.34%
2017	2,369	+0.58%
2023	2,574	+1.39%

Source: EHESS and INSEE (1968-2023)

== Education ==
As of 2016 the commune has one school with 217 students, with 75 in preschool (école maternelle) and 142 in elementary school. The preschool and elementary school are in the groupe scolaire "Les Néfliers". Students go to a junior high school (collège) in Vouvray, Collège public Gaston Huet.

== See also ==
- Communes of the Indre-et-Loire department
- Tours Loire Valley Airport
