= Valmer =

Valmer may refer to:

- Jimmy Valmer, a fictional character from the American animated television series South Park
- La Croix-Valmer, Var, France, commune
- Valmer Castle, a chateau located northeast of Chançay, France
- Villa Valmer, a historic mansion in Marseille, Bouches-du-Rhône, France
- Jean-Auguste-Gustave Binet (1875–1940), Franco-Swiss novelist and journalist with the pen name Binet-Valmer
