= Canton of Vouvray =

Canton in Indre-et-Loire, France

Coordinates: 47.41°N 0.80°E

The canton of Vouvray is an administrative division of the Indre-et-Loire department, central France. Its borders were modified at the French canton reorganisation which came into effect in March 2015. Its seat is in Vouvray.

It consists of the following communes:

1. Chanceaux-sur-Choisille
2. Chançay
3. Mettray
4. Monnaie
5. Notre-Dame-d'Oé
6. Parçay-Meslay
7. Reugny
8. Rochecorbon
9. Vernou-sur-Brenne
10. Vouvray
