= Mettray =

- Commune
- Coat of arms
- Location of Mettray
- Location within France Location within Centre-Val de Loire
- Coordinates: 47°27′10″N 0°38′57″E
- Country: France
- Region: Centre-Val de Loire
- Department: Indre-et-Loire
- Arrondissement: Tours
- Canton: Vouvray
- Intercommunality: Tours Métropole Val de Loire

Government
  - Mayor (2020–2026): Philippe Clémot
- Area^{1}: 10.34 km^{2} (3.99 sq mi)
- Highest elevation: 100 m (330 ft)
- Lowest elevation: 57 m (187 ft)
- Population (2023): 2,070
  - Density: 200/km^{2} (518/sq mi)
- Time zone: UTC+01:00 (CET)
  - Summer (DST): UTC+02:00 (CEST)
- INSEE/Postal code: 37152 /37390
- ^{1} French Land Register data, which excludes lakes, ponds, glaciers > 1 km^{2} (0.386 sq mi or 247 acres) and river estuaries.

Mettray (French pronunciation: [mɛtʁɛ]) is a commune in the Indre-et-Loire department in central France. The Mettray Penal Colony was opened there in 1839.

== Population ==
The inhabitants are called Mettrayens in French. The commune La Membrolle-sur-Choisille was created in 1873 from part of Mettray.

Historical population

Year	Pop.	±% p.a.
1793	1,017	—
1800	1,089	+0.98%
1806	1,247	+2.28%
1821	846	−2.55%
1831	1,212	+3.66%
1836	1,294	+1.32%
1841	1,460	+2.44%
1846	1,960	+6.07%
1851	2,090	+1.29%
1856	2,176	+0.81%
1861	2,311	+1.21%
1866	2,517	+1.72%
1872	2,344	−1.18%
1876	1,615	−8.89%
1881	1,413	−2.64%
1886	1,416	+0.04%
1891	1,461	+0.63%
1896	1,399	−0.86%
1901	1,324	−1.10%

Year	Pop.	±% p.a.
1906	1,196	−2.01%
1911	1,243	+0.77%
1921	1,110	−1.13%
1926	1,163	+0.94%
1931	1,205	+0.71%
1936	1,280	+1.21%
1946	737	−5.37%
1954	983	+3.67%
1962	1,036	+0.66%
1968	1,021	−0.24%
1975	1,083	+0.85%
1982	1,368	+3.39%
1990	1,916	+4.30%
1999	2,029	+0.64%
2007	1,951	−0.49%
2012	2,088	+1.37%
2017	2,068	−0.19%
2023	2,070	+0.02%

Source: EHESS and INSEE (1968-2023)

== See also ==
- Communes of the Indre-et-Loire department
