= Notre-Dame-d'Oé =

- Commune
- Coat of arms
- Location of Notre-Dame-d'Oé
- Location within France Location within Centre-Val de Loire
- Coordinates: 47°27′30″N 0°42′32″E
- Country: France
- Region: Centre-Val de Loire
- Department: Indre-et-Loire
- Arrondissement: Tours
- Canton: Vouvray
- Intercommunality: Tours Métropole Val de Loire

Government
  - Mayor (2020–2026): Patrick Lefrancois
- Area^{1}: 7.73 km^{2} (2.98 sq mi)
- Highest elevation: 109 m (358 ft)
- Lowest elevation: 85 m (279 ft)
- Population (2023): 4,515
  - Density: 584/km^{2} (1,510/sq mi)
- Time zone: UTC+01:00 (CET)
  - Summer (DST): UTC+02:00 (CEST)
- INSEE/Postal code: 37172 /37390
- ^{1} French Land Register data, which excludes lakes, ponds, glaciers > 1 km^{2} (0.386 sq mi or 247 acres) and river estuaries.

Notre-Dame-d'Oé (French pronunciation: [nɔtʁ dam dɔe]) is a commune in the Indre-et-Loire department of central France.

== Population ==
Historical population

Year	Pop.	±% p.a.
1793	337	—
1800	353	+0.66%
1806	361	+0.37%
1821	404	+0.75%
1831	450	+1.08%
1836	465	+0.66%
1841	453	−0.52%
1846	501	+2.03%
1851	487	−0.57%
1856	429	−2.50%
1861	477	+2.14%
1866	481	+0.17%
1872	504	+0.78%
1876	501	−0.15%
1881	481	−0.81%
1886	481	+0.00%
1891	491	+0.41%
1896	468	−0.95%
1901	430	−1.68%

Year	Pop.	±% p.a.
1906	452	+1.00%
1911	404	−2.22%
1921	404	+0.00%
1926	382	−1.11%
1931	417	+1.77%
1936	398	−0.93%
1946	516	+2.63%
1954	546	+0.71%
1962	542	−0.09%
1968	568	+0.78%
1975	1,149	+10.59%
1982	2,155	+9.40%
1990	2,557	+2.16%
1999	3,359	+3.08%
2007	3,511	+0.55%
2012	3,948	+2.37%
2017	4,125	+0.88%
2023	4,515	+1.52%

Source: EHESS and INSEE (1968–2023)

== See also ==
- Communes of the Indre-et-Loire department
