= Chanceaux-sur-Choisille =

- Commune
- Location of Chanceaux-sur-Choisille
- Location within France Location within Centre-Val de Loire
- Coordinates: 47°28′00″N 0°42′00″E
- Country: France
- Region: Centre-Val de Loire
- Department: Indre-et-Loire
- Arrondissement: Tours
- Canton: Vouvray
- Intercommunality: Tours Métropole Val de Loire

Government
  - Mayor (2020–2026): Gérard Daviet
- Area^{1}: 18.47 km^{2} (7.13 sq mi)
- Highest elevation: 121 m (397 ft)
- Lowest elevation: 62 m (203 ft)
- Population (2023): 3,499
  - Density: 189.4/km^{2} (490.7/sq mi)
- Time zone: UTC+01:00 (CET)
  - Summer (DST): UTC+02:00 (CEST)
- INSEE/Postal code: 37054 /37390
- ^{1} French Land Register data, which excludes lakes, ponds, glaciers > 1 km^{2} (0.386 sq mi or 247 acres) and river estuaries.

Chanceaux-sur-Choisille (French pronunciation: [ʃɑ̃so syʁ ʃwazij]) is a commune in the Indre-et-Loire department in central France.

== Population ==
Historical population

Year	Pop.	±% p.a.
1793	523	—
1800	419	−3.12%
1806	597	+6.08%
1821	604	+0.08%
1831	617	+0.21%
1836	694	+2.38%
1841	712	+0.51%
1846	676	−1.03%
1851	694	+0.53%
1856	716	+0.63%
1861	745	+0.80%
1866	732	−0.35%
1872	658	−1.76%
1876	649	−0.34%
1881	777	+3.67%
1886	724	−1.40%
1891	715	−0.25%
1896	708	−0.20%
1901	658	−1.45%

Year	Pop.	±% p.a.
1906	644	−0.43%
1911	614	−0.95%
1921	615	+0.02%
1926	604	−0.36%
1931	606	+0.07%
1936	660	+1.72%
1946	599	−0.97%
1954	662	+1.26%
1962	726	+1.16%
1968	701	−0.58%
1975	959	+4.58%
1982	1,801	+9.42%
1990	2,601	+4.70%
1999	2,821	+0.91%
2007	3,573	+3.00%
2012	3,539	−0.19%
2017	3,515	−0.14%
2023	3,499	−0.08%

Source: EHESS and INSEE (1968-2023)

== See also ==
- Communes of the Indre-et-Loire department
