= Domaine Huet =

Coordinates: 47.4136°N 0.8084°E

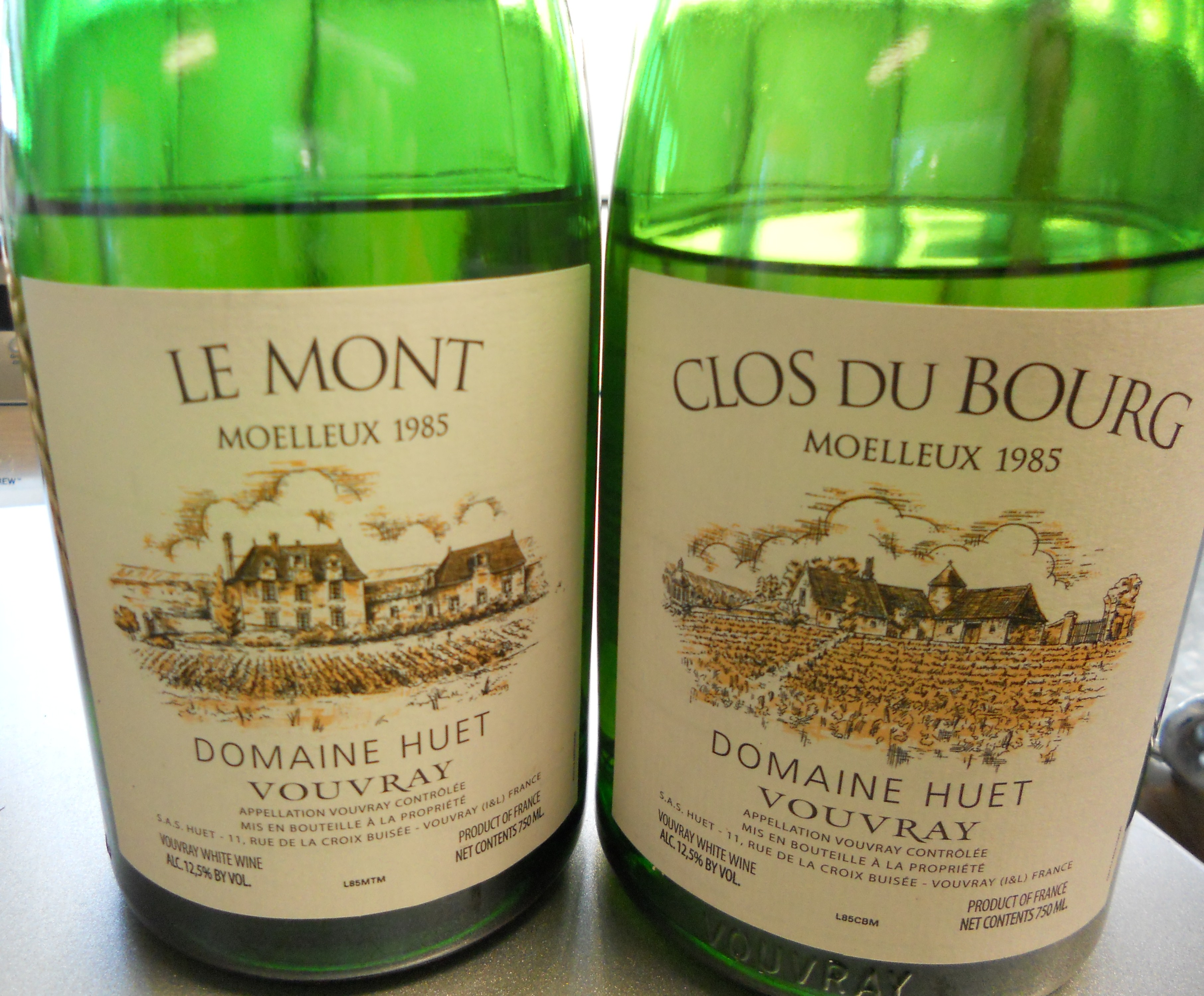
Vouvray AOC moelleux Domaine Huet 1985

Domaine Huet is a wine estate located in Vouvray, France, in the region of the Loire Valley. Founded in 1928 by Victor Huet and his son Gaston Huet, it is known for producing exceptional wines from chenin blanc.

== Viticulture ==
Domaine Huet has 30 hectares of biodynamically farmed vineyards in the Vouvray appellation, composed of the following parcels:

- Le Haut-Lieu, 15 hectares
- Le Clos du Bourg, 6 hectares (acquired 1953)
- Le Mont, 9 hectares (acquired 1957)

== Winemaking ==
Domaine Huet produces wines in a range of styles, including pétillant, sec, demi-sec, and moelleux. Domaine Huet is considered the most celebrated wine producer from the Loire Valley, and is the only one to have headlined a Christie's auction.

== Recent history ==
Upon the death of Gaston Huet in 2002, the company was sold to cover the French death tax. The Hwang family, who also own Hungary's Királyudvar Winery, purchased the domaine in 2003. Noël Pinguet, son-in-law of Gaston Huet, stayed on as winemaker until February, 2012.

== Wine criticism ==
In 2005 Decanter Magazine created a list of their 100 Greatest Wines ever made. A 1947 S.A. Huet was ranked #6 on this listing—the second-highest ranking for any white wine behind only the 1921 vintage of Chateau d'Yquem.
