= Rochecorbon =

- Commune
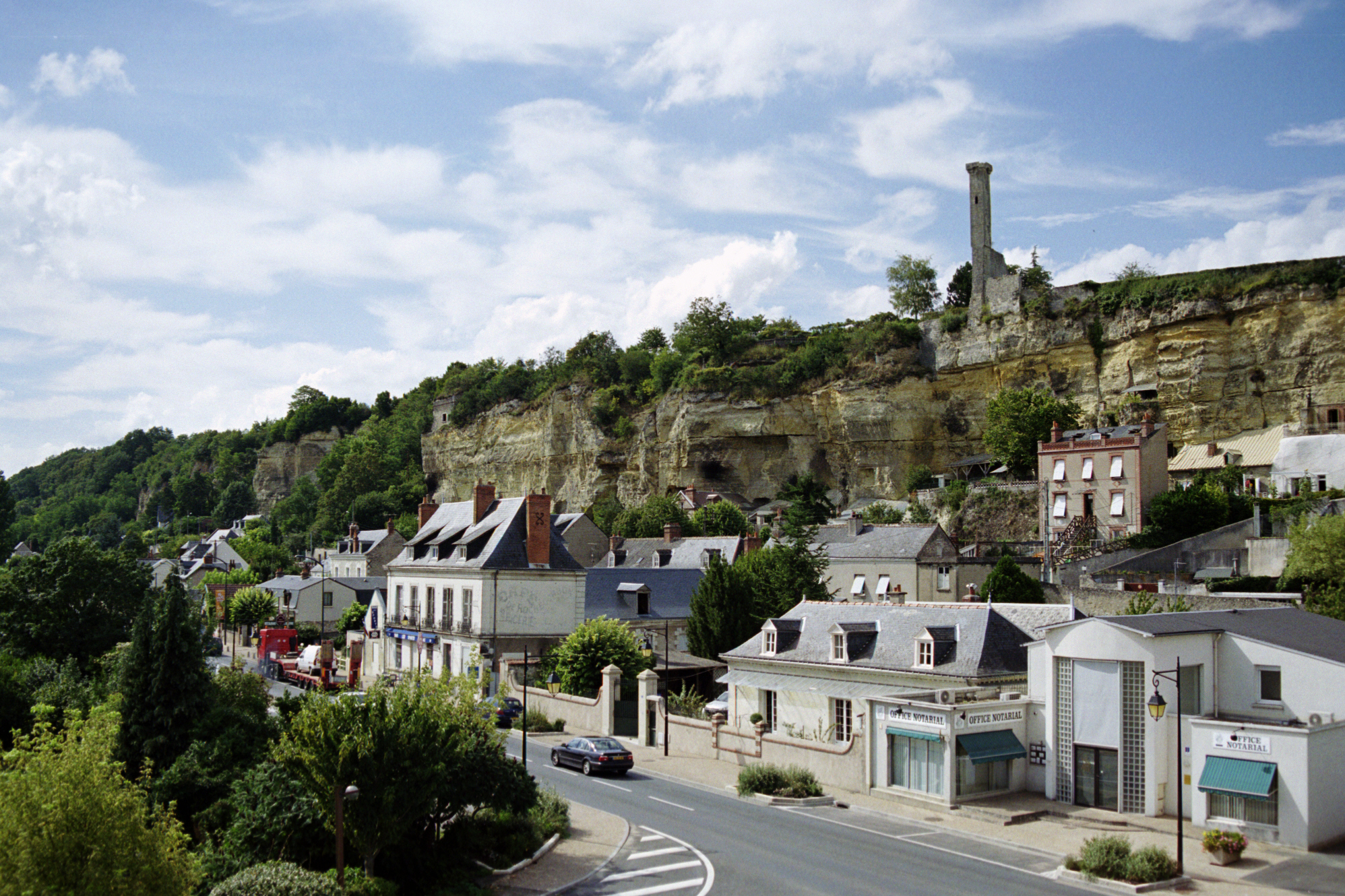
- Rochecorbon and the "lantern"

- Coat of arms
- Location of Rochecorbon
- Location within France Location within Centre-Val de Loire
- Coordinates: 47°24′55″N 0°45′21″E
- Country: France
- Region: Centre-Val de Loire
- Department: Indre-et-Loire
- Arrondissement: Tours
- Canton: Vouvray
- Intercommunality: Tours Métropole Val de Loire

Government
  - Mayor (2020–2026): Emmanuel Duménil
- Area^{1}: 17.09 km^{2} (6.60 sq mi)
- Highest elevation: 124 m (407 ft)
- Lowest elevation: 47 m (154 ft)
- Population (2023): 3,219
  - Density: 188.4/km^{2} (487.8/sq mi)
- Time zone: UTC+01:00 (CET)
  - Summer (DST): UTC+02:00 (CEST)
- INSEE/Postal code: 37203 /37210
- ^{1} French Land Register data, which excludes lakes, ponds, glaciers > 1 km^{2} (0.386 sq mi or 247 acres) and river estuaries.

Rochecorbon (French pronunciation: [ʁɔʃkɔʁbɔ̃]) is a commune in the Indre-et-Loire department, central France.

== Population ==
Historical population

Year	Pop.	±% p.a.
1793	1,378	—
1800	1,382	+0.04%
1806	1,385	+0.04%
1821	1,593	+0.94%
1831	1,742	+0.90%
1836	1,746	+0.05%
1841	1,722	−0.28%
1846	1,755	+0.38%
1851	1,676	−0.92%
1856	1,579	−1.19%
1861	1,592	+0.16%
1866	1,545	−0.60%
1872	1,521	−0.26%
1876	1,539	+0.29%
1881	1,554	+0.19%
1886	1,601	+0.60%
1891	1,564	−0.47%
1896	1,544	−0.26%
1901	1,612	+0.87%

Year	Pop.	±% p.a.
1906	1,572	−0.50%
1911	1,524	−0.62%
1921	1,543	+0.12%
1926	1,678	+1.69%
1931	1,824	+1.68%
1936	1,821	−0.03%
1946	1,868	+0.26%
1954	2,094	+1.44%
1962	2,089	−0.03%
1968	2,216	+0.99%
1975	2,349	+0.84%
1982	2,711	+2.07%
1990	2,685	−0.12%
1999	2,982	+1.17%
2007	3,244	+1.06%
2012	3,232	−0.07%
2017	3,146	−0.54%
2023	3,219	+0.38%

Source: EHESS and INSEE (1968-2023)

== See also ==
- Communes of the Indre-et-Loire department
