= Vernou-sur-Brenne =

- Commune
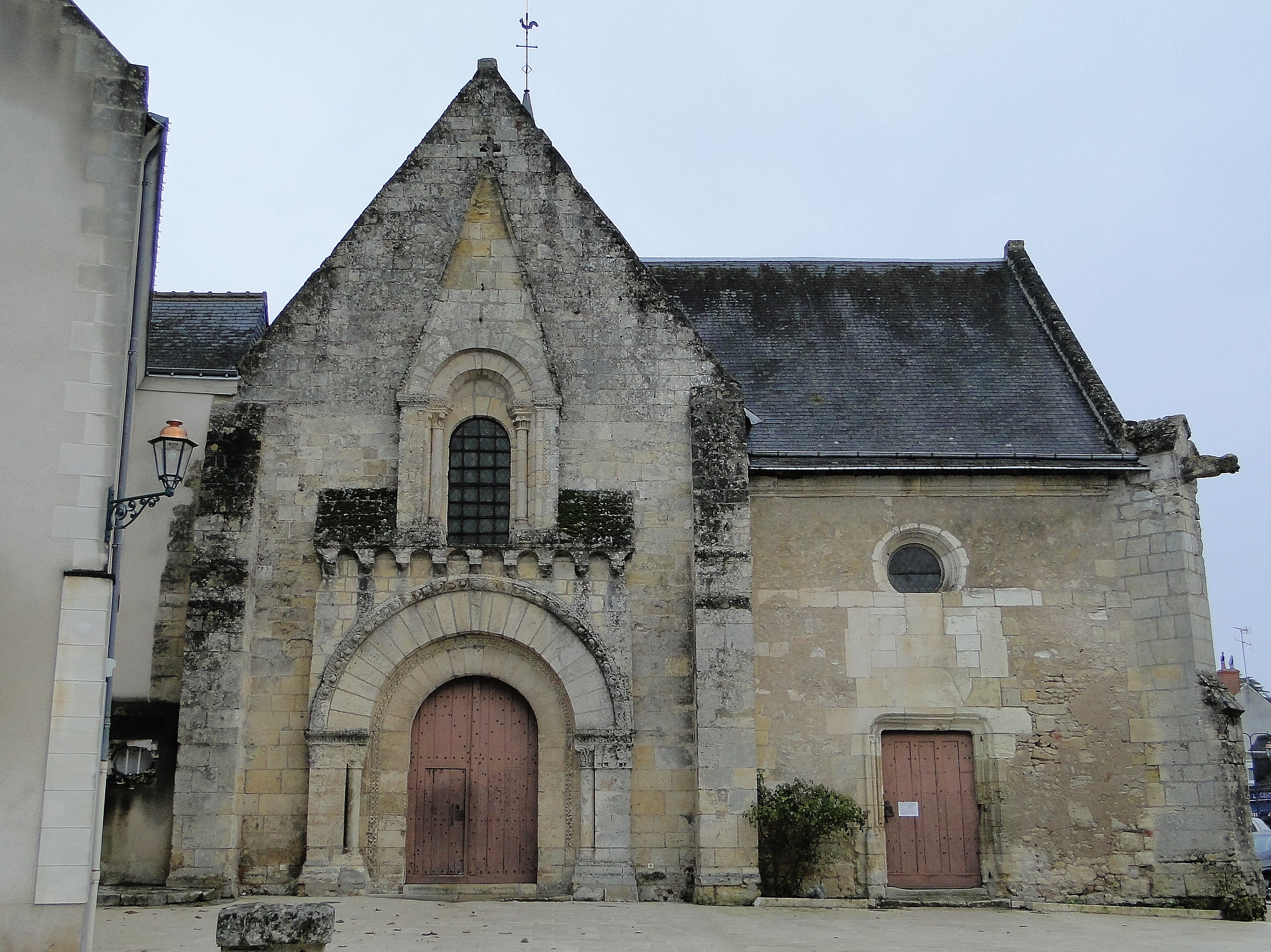
- The church of Sainte-Trininté, in Vernou-sur-Brenne

- Coat of arms
- Location of Vernou-sur-Brenne
- Location within France Location within Centre-Val de Loire
- Coordinates: 47°25′19″N 0°50′47″E
- Country: France
- Region: Centre-Val de Loire
- Department: Indre-et-Loire
- Arrondissement: Tours
- Canton: Vouvray

Government
  - Mayor (2020–2026): Pascale Devallée
- Area^{1}: 25.91 km^{2} (10.00 sq mi)
- Highest elevation: 130 m (430 ft)
- Lowest elevation: 47 m (154 ft)
- Population (2023): 2,870
  - Density: 111/km^{2} (287/sq mi)
- Time zone: UTC+01:00 (CET)
  - Summer (DST): UTC+02:00 (CEST)
- INSEE/Postal code: 37270 /37210
- ^{1} French Land Register data, which excludes lakes, ponds, glaciers > 1 km^{2} (0.386 sq mi or 247 acres) and river estuaries.

Vernou-sur-Brenne (French pronunciation: [vɛʁnu syʁ bʁɛn]) is a commune in the Indre-et-Loire department in central France.

== Population ==
Historical population

Year	Pop.	±% p.a.
1793	1,500	—
1800	1,518	+0.17%
1806	1,547	+0.32%
1821	1,668	+0.50%
1831	1,760	+0.54%
1836	1,828	+0.76%
1841	1,890	+0.67%
1846	1,953	+0.66%
1851	1,847	−1.11%
1856	1,776	−0.78%
1861	1,837	+0.68%
1866	1,932	+1.01%
1872	1,918	−0.12%
1876	1,873	−0.59%
1881	1,862	−0.12%
1886	1,927	+0.69%
1891	1,975	+0.49%
1896	1,848	−1.32%
1901	1,866	+0.19%

Year	Pop.	±% p.a.
1906	1,907	+0.44%
1911	1,785	−1.31%
1921	1,682	−0.59%
1926	1,684	+0.02%
1931	1,571	−1.38%
1936	1,531	−0.51%
1946	1,789	+1.57%
1954	1,962	+1.16%
1962	1,822	−0.92%
1968	2,000	+1.57%
1975	1,992	−0.06%
1982	2,050	+0.41%
1990	2,197	+0.87%
1999	2,452	+1.23%
2007	2,732	+1.36%
2012	2,651	−0.60%
2017	2,707	+0.42%
2023	2,870	+0.98%

Source: EHESS and INSEE (1968-2023)

== See also ==
- Communes of the Indre-et-Loire department
