= Chançay =

- Commune
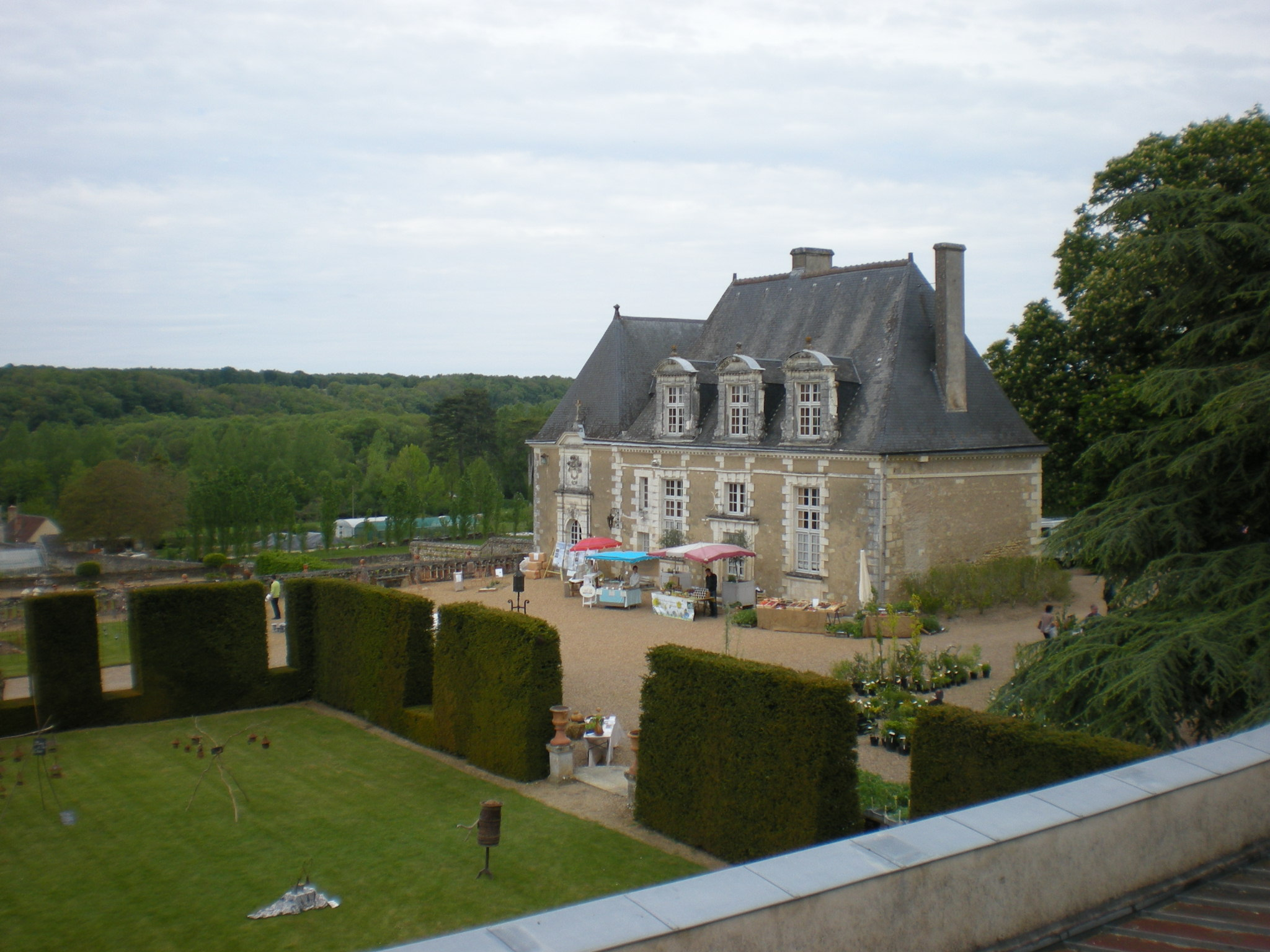
- Chateau of Valmer

- Coat of arms
- Location of Chançay
- Location within France Location within Centre-Val de Loire
- Coordinates: 47°27′10″N 0°52′28″E
- Country: France
- Region: Centre-Val de Loire
- Department: Indre-et-Loire
- Arrondissement: Tours
- Canton: Vouvray

Government
  - Mayor (2020–2026): François Lalot
- Area^{1}: 15.04 km^{2} (5.81 sq mi)
- Highest elevation: 115 m (377 ft)
- Lowest elevation: 54 m (177 ft)
- Population (2023): 1,122
  - Density: 74.60/km^{2} (193.2/sq mi)
- Time zone: UTC+01:00 (CET)
  - Summer (DST): UTC+02:00 (CEST)
- INSEE/Postal code: 37052 /37210
- ^{1} French Land Register data, which excludes lakes, ponds, glaciers > 1 km^{2} (0.386 sq mi or 247 acres) and river estuaries.

Chançay (French pronunciation: [ʃɑ̃sɛ]) is a commune in the Indre-et-Loire department in central France.

== Population ==
Historical population
Year	Pop.	±% p.a.
1968	579	—
1975	603	+0.58%
1982	814	+4.38%
1990	894	+1.18%
1999	947	+0.64%
2007	999	+0.67%
2012	1,126	+2.42%
2017	1,137	+0.19%
2023	1,122	−0.22%
Source: INSEE

The inhabitants are called Chancéens in French.

== See also ==
- Communes of the Indre-et-Loire department
