= Arbois (grape) =

Variety of grape

- Grape (Vitis)
- Color of berry skin: Blanc
- Species: Vitis vinifera
- Also called: Arbois Blanc and other synonyms
- Origin: France
- Notable regions: Loire
- VIVC number: 562

Arbois or Arbois Blanc is a white French wine grape variety planted primarily in the Loire regions. Despite being a minor grape, in the late 20th century it was the third most widely planted grape variety in the Loir-et-Cher département which includes the winemaking areas of Cheverny, Cour-Cheverny, Montrichard, Oisly, Saint-Romain-sur-Cher, Valençay as well as vineyards that make wines under the Touraine AOC, Cremant de Loire AOC and Vin de Pays du Loir et Cher. By 2004 acreage had steadily declined to around 750 acres (300 hectares). It is still a permitted grape variety in the Appellation d'origine contrôlée (AOC) regions of Cheverny AOC, Valençay AOC and Vouvray AOC.

== History ==
Today Arbois is most widely planted in the Loir-et-Cher département.

Ampelographers are not completely sure about Arbois' origins though some of the grape's synonyms seem to suggest a relationship with the Pinot family, as does its weak association with the Jura wine region of Arbois AOC (mostly through its similarities in leaf structure with Savagnin). It is most likely that the grape is native to the Loire Valley. Most of the grape's viticultural history is tied into the historic Touraine region where it is still most prevalent today, particularly in the Loir-et-Cher département. The grape is on the decline in plantings and importance though it is still a permitted grape variety in several AOCs including being the only grape other than Chenin blanc permitted in Vouvray.

== Wine ==
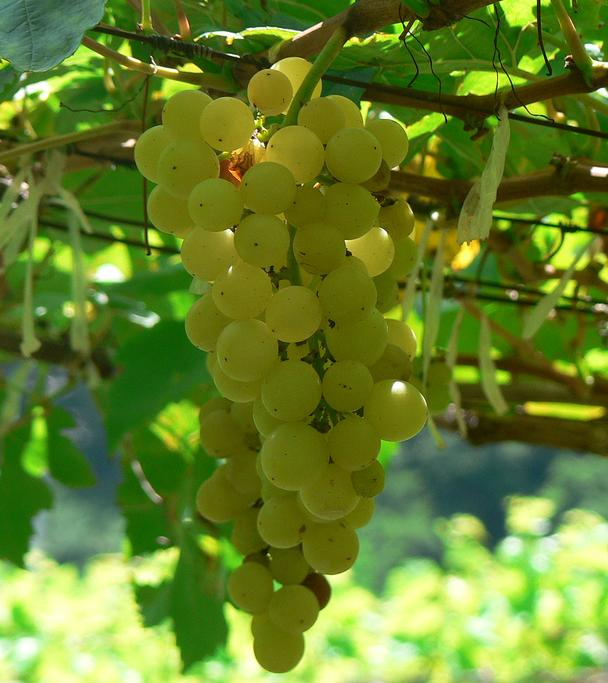
Arbois has less acidity than Chenin blanc (pictured) and may be blended as a softening influence for a wine.

The Arbois grapevine is highly vigorous and prone to producing high yields. If the yields are not kept in check, the white wines produced from the grapes can be less refined in flavor. Compared to the Chenin blanc grape that is found throughout the Loire, Arbois tends to produce softer wines with less noticeable acidity. For this reason, Arbois has mostly been valued as a "softening" agent to the higher acid varieties of Chenin blanc, Savagnin and Romorantin.

== Synonyms ==
Among the synonyms that Arbois is known under throughout France are Menu Pineau and Petit Pineau. Other synonyms include Herbois, Orbois and Verdet.
