= Vouvray =

- Commune
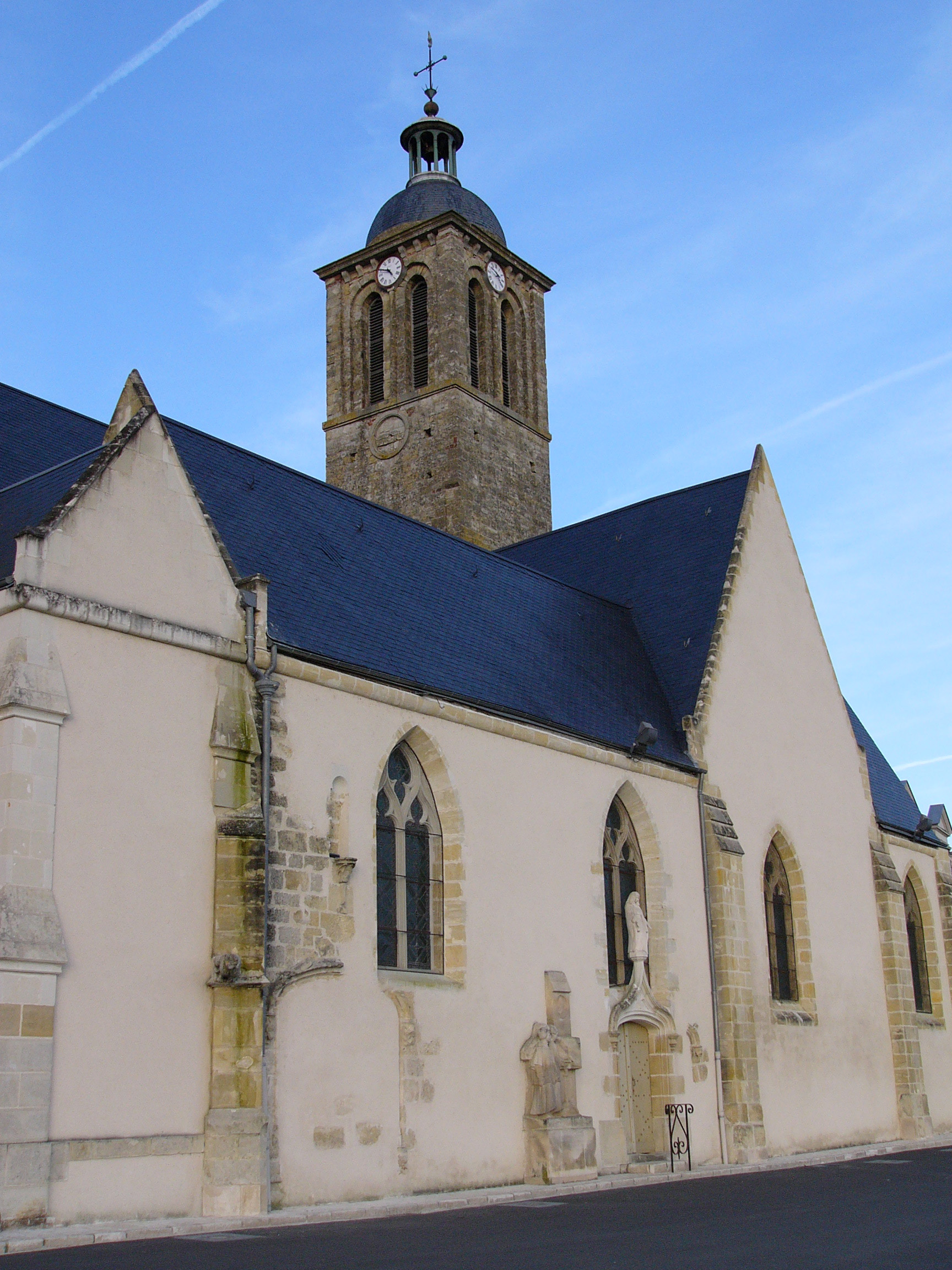
- The church in Vouvray

- Coat of arms
- Location of Vouvray
- Location within France Location within Centre-Val de Loire
- Coordinates: 47°24′46″N 0°48′00″E
- Country: France
- Region: Centre-Val de Loire
- Department: Indre-et-Loire
- Arrondissement: Tours
- Canton: Vouvray
- Intercommunality: Touraine-Est Vallées

Government
  - Mayor (2020–2026): Brigitte Pineau
- Area^{1}: 22.92 km^{2} (8.85 sq mi)
- Highest elevation: 121 m (397 ft)
- Lowest elevation: 48 m (157 ft)
- Population (2023): 3,420
  - Density: 149/km^{2} (386/sq mi)
- Time zone: UTC+01:00 (CET)
  - Summer (DST): UTC+02:00 (CEST)
- INSEE/Postal code: 37281 /37210
- ^{1} French Land Register data, which excludes lakes, ponds, glaciers > 1 km^{2} (0.386 sq mi or 247 acres) and river estuaries.

Vouvray (UK: /ˈvuːvreɪ/, US: /vuːˈvreɪ/, French pronunciation: [vuvʁɛ]) is a commune in the Indre-et-Loire department in central France. It is around 9 km east of the centre of Tours.

It is best known for its production of white wine, rated among the best in France.

== Population ==
Historical population

Year	Pop.	±% p.a.
1793	2,080	—
1800	1,954	−0.89%
1806	2,266	+2.50%
1821	2,425	+0.45%
1831	2,387	−0.16%
1836	2,610	+1.80%
1841	2,443	−1.31%
1846	2,341	−0.85%
1851	2,418	+0.65%
1856	2,295	−1.04%
1861	2,438	+1.22%
1866	2,267	−1.44%
1872	2,180	−0.65%
1876	2,227	+0.53%
1881	2,246	+0.17%
1886	2,299	+0.47%
1891	2,250	−0.43%
1896	2,361	+0.97%
1901	2,285	−0.65%

Year	Pop.	±% p.a.
1906	2,350	+0.56%
1911	2,335	−0.13%
1921	2,165	−0.75%
1926	2,333	+1.51%
1931	2,245	−0.77%
1936	2,249	+0.04%
1946	2,552	+1.27%
1954	2,617	+0.31%
1962	2,753	+0.64%
1968	2,725	−0.17%
1975	2,606	−0.64%
1982	2,469	−0.77%
1990	2,933	+2.18%
1999	3,046	+0.42%
2007	3,079	+0.13%
2012	3,046	−0.22%
2017	3,238	+1.23%
2023	3,420	+0.92%

Source: EHESS and INSEE (1968-2023)

== Education ==
Schools include a public preschool; a public elementary school, Ecole élémentaire publique de Vouvray; a public junior high school, Collège public Gaston Huet; and a private elementary and junior high school, Ecole et Collège Sainte Thérèse à Vouvray.

== See also ==
- Communes of the Indre-et-Loire department
