= Rosé =

Type of wine with some color from grape skins

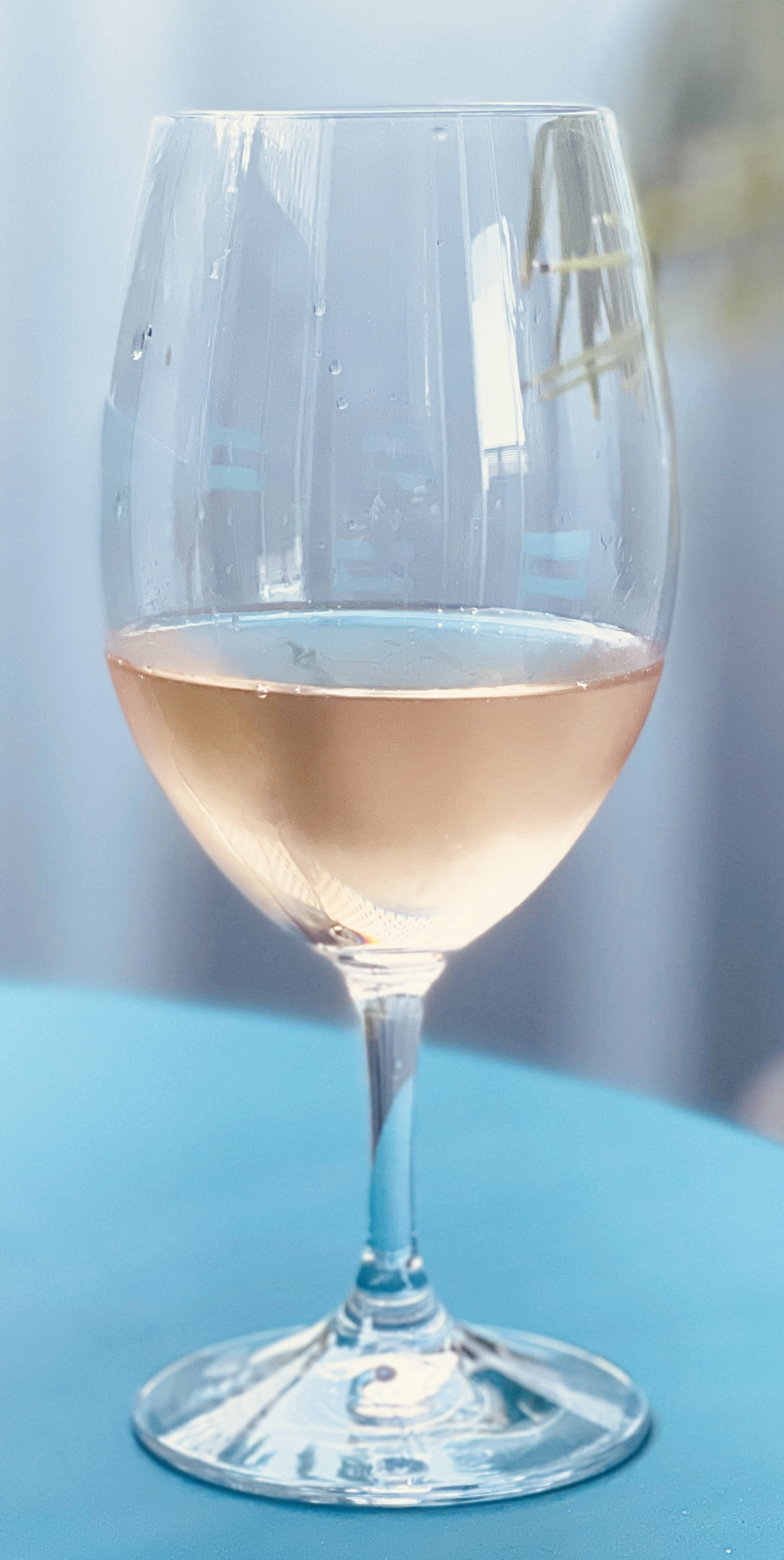
A glass of rosé wine.

A rosé (French: [ʁoze]) is a type of wine that incorporates some of the color from the grape skins, but not enough to qualify it as a red wine. It may be the oldest known type of wine, as it is the most straightforward to make with the skin contact method. The pink color can range from a pale "onionskin" orange to a vivid near-purple, depending on the grape varieties used and winemaking techniques. Usually, the wine is labelled rosé in French, Portuguese, and English-speaking countries; rosado in Spanish; rosat in Catalan; or rosato in Italian.

There are three major ways to produce rosé wine: skin contact, saignée, and blending. Rosé wines can be made still, semi-sparkling or sparkling and with a wide range of sweetness levels from highly dry Provençal rosé to sweet White Zinfandels and blushes. Rosé wines are made from a wide variety of grapes and can be found all around the globe.

When rosé wine is the primary product, it is produced with the skin contact method. Black-skinned grapes are crushed and the skins are allowed to remain in contact with the juice for a short period, typically two to twenty hours. The grape must is then pressed and the skins discarded, rather than left in contact throughout fermentation (as with red wine making). The longer the skins are left in contact with the juice, the more intense the color of the final wine.

When a winemaker desires to impart more tannin and color to red wine, some of the pink juice from the must can be removed at an early stage in what is known as the Saignée (from French bleeding) method. The red wine remaining in the vats is intensified as a result of the bleeding, because the volume of juice in the must is reduced, and the must involved in the maceration becomes more concentrated. The pink juice that is removed can be fermented separately to produce rosé.

The simple mixing of red wine into white wine to impart color is uncommon and is discouraged in most wine growing regions, especially in France, where it is forbidden by law, except for Champagne. Even in Champagne, several high-end producers do not use this method but rather opt for the saignée method.

== History ==
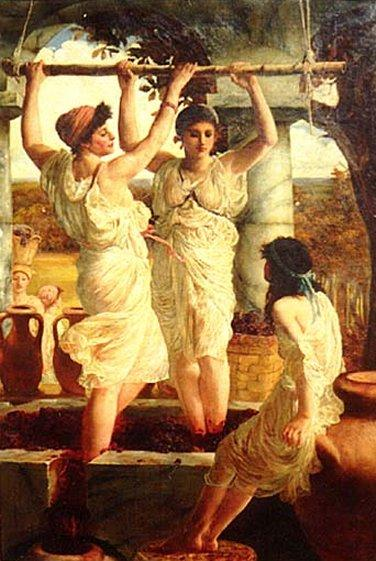
Many of the earliest red wines were closer in color to modern rosé since many of the early winemaking techniques involved pressing soon after harvest.

It is not known when the first wine labeled as a rosé was produced, but it is very likely that many of the earliest red wines made were closer in appearance to today's rosés than they would be to modern red wines. This is because many of the winemaking techniques used to make today's darker, more tannic red wines (such as extended maceration and harder pressing) were not widely practised in ancient winemaking. Both red and white wine grapes were often pressed soon after harvest, (with very little maceration time) by hand, feet or even sack cloth, creating juice that was only lightly pigmented.

Even after the development of newer, more efficient wine presses, many ancient and early winemakers still preferred making the lighter colored and fruitier style of wines. There was an understanding, as early as the time of the Ancient Greeks and Roman winemakers, that harder pressing and letting the juice "sit" for a period with the skins would make darker, heartier wines, but the resulting wines were often considered too harsh and less desirable. This sentiment lasted well into the Middle Ages, when the pale clarets from Bordeaux were starting to gain the world's attention. To the powerful English market, the most prized clarets were, according to wine historian Hugh Johnson, the vin d'une nuit or "wine of one night", which were pale-rosé colored wines made from juice that was allowed only a single night of skin contact. The darker wine produced from must that had longer skin contact were known as the vin vermeilh (or pinpin to the English) was considered to be of much lesser quality.

Similarly, in the early history of Champagne, the wines produced from this region during the Middle Ages were nothing like the sparkling white wines associated with the region today. Instead they were pale red and even pinkish, with some Champenois winemakers using elderberries to add more red color to the wines as they competed with the wines of Burgundy for the lucrative Flemish wine trade. In the 16th and 17th century, the region achieved some acclaim for their "white" wines made from Pinot noir grapes, but rather than actually being white, these wines were instead a pale "greyish pink" that was reminiscent of a "partridge's eye" and earned the nickname Œil de Perdrix—a style of rosé still being produced in Switzerland. In the late 17th century, the Champenois (aided by the work of Dom Perignon) learned how to better separate the skins from the must and produce truly white wine from red wine grapes.

Even as Champenois moved towards producing sparkling wines, they continued to produce both sparkling and still rosés often by means of blending a small amount of red wine to "color up" an already-made white wine. The depth of color was dependent on the amount red wine added, with the red wine having more influence on the resulting flavor of the wine if added in larger volumes.

=== After World War II ===
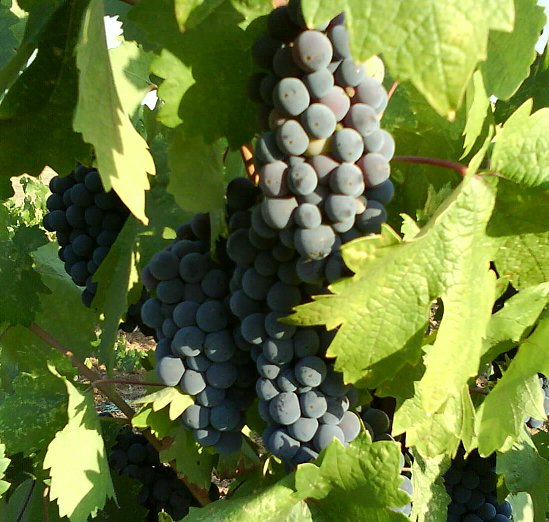
A stuck fermentation while producing a red wine from Zinfandel leads to the development of the rose-colored wine White Zinfandel.

The history of rosé would take a dramatic turn following the conclusion of World War II when two Portuguese wine producer families both released sweet, slightly sparkling rosés to the European and American markets. These wines, Mateus and Lancers, would go on to set record sales in Europe and the US and dominate the Portuguese wine industry for most of the 20th century, but their popularity has declined in the recent years of the 21st century. While they still have a presence in the European and US markets, the trend towards traditional, drier rosés, as well as the development of American "blush" wines like White Zinfandel, have cut into their market shares.

In the early 1970s, demand for white wine exceeded the availability of white wine grapes, so many California producers made "white" wine from red grapes, in a form of saignée production with minimal skin contact, the "whiter" the better. In 1975, Sutter Home's "White Zinfandel" wine experienced a stuck fermentation, a problem in which the yeast goes dormant, or in some cases dies off before all the sugar is turned to alcohol. Winemaker Bob Trinchero put it aside for two weeks, then upon tasting it he decided to sell this pinker, sweeter wine.

In 1976, wine writer Jerry D. Mead visited Mill Creek Vineyards in Sonoma County, California. Charles Kreck had been one of the first to plant Cabernet Sauvignon vines in California, and offered Mead a wine made from Cabernet that was a pale pink and not yet named. Kreck would not call it "White Cabernet" as it was much darker in color than red grape "white" wines of the time, though not as dark as the rosés he had known. Mead jokingly suggested the name "Cabernet Blush"; later that evening, he phoned Kreck to say that he no longer thought the name to be a joke. In 1978 Kreck trademarked the word "Blush". The name caught on as a marketing name for the semi-sweet wines from producers such as Sutter Home and Beringer. Today, Blush wine appears on wine lists more often as a category, rather than a specific wine. In 2010 Mill Creek produced a rosé wine for the first time in years, although Jeremy Kreck (Charles' grandson and current winemaker) chose not to use the Blush name.

Although "blush" originally referred to a color (pale pink), it now tends to indicate a relatively sweet pink wine, typically with 2.5% residual sugar; in North America, dry pink wines are usually marketed as rosé but sometimes as blush. In Europe, almost all pink wines are referred to as rosé regardless of sugar levels, even semi-sweet ones from California. As the term rosé regained popularity in the US market, shares of wine labeled "blush" declined from 22% of all wines consumed in the US in 1997 to 15% in 2003.

In the United States, a record 2005 California crop has resulted in an increased production and proliferation of varietals used for rosés, as winemakers chose to make rosé rather than leave their reds unsold. Rosé became a viral drink in 2015, with men who drink rosé being referred to as brosé. In summer 2016, a slushy variation, frosé, was developed at the Bar Primi in New York.

== Winemaking methods ==
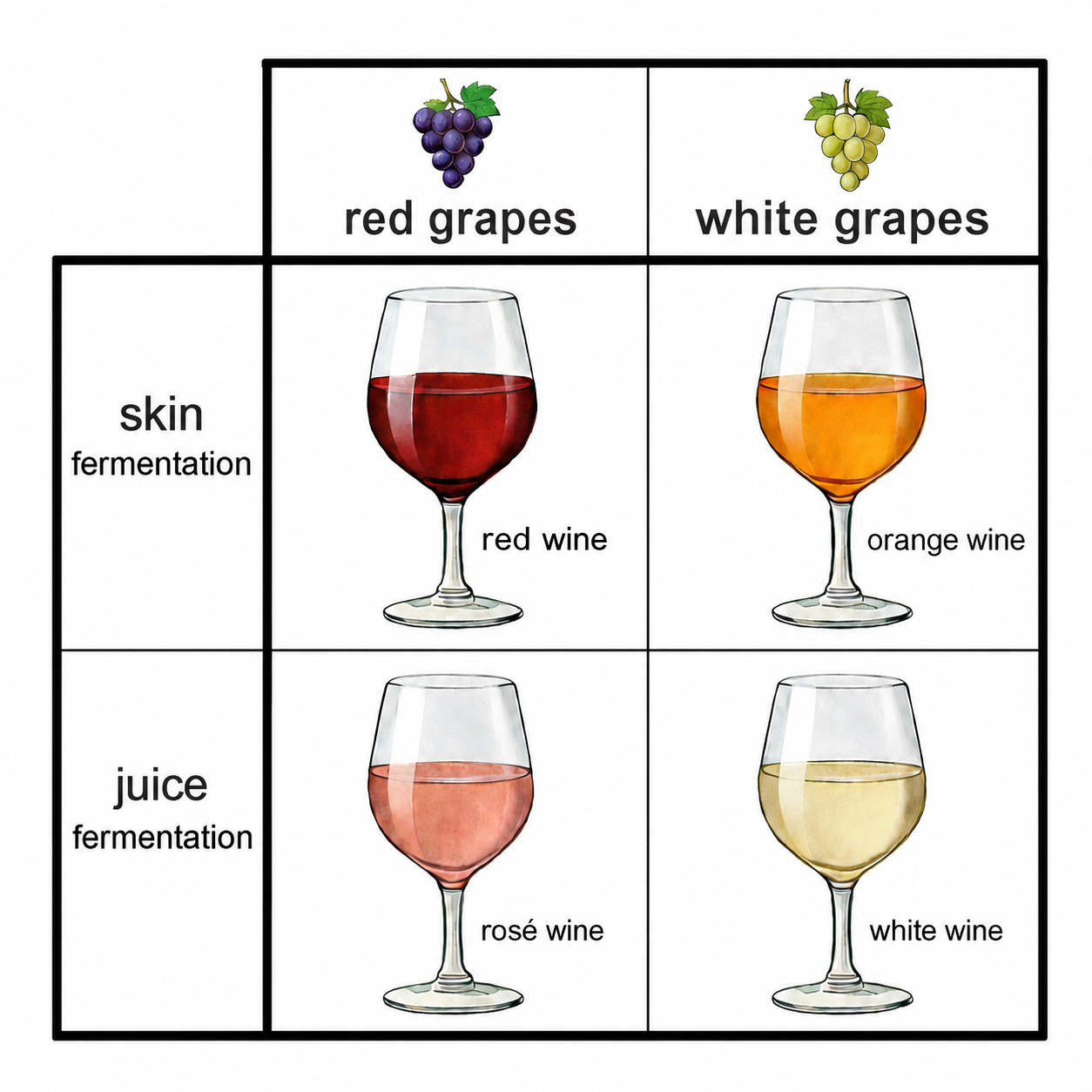
Simplified illustration of the four colors of wine – red wine, orange wine, rosé wine, white wine

Rosés can be produced in a variety of ways with the most common method being early pressing of red grape varieties after a very short period, usually 12–24 hours, of skin-contact (maceration). During maceration, phenolics such as the anthocyanins and tannins that contribute to color as well as many flavor components are leached from the skins, seeds and any stems left in contact with the must. In addition to adding color and flavor, these phenolics also serve as antioxidants, protecting the wine from degradation of oxygen exposure. While red wines will often have maceration last several days to even several weeks, the very limited maceration of rosés means that these wines will have less stable color, potential flavor components and oxygen protection. This contributes to wines with shorter shelf-life that are meant to be consumed soon after release.

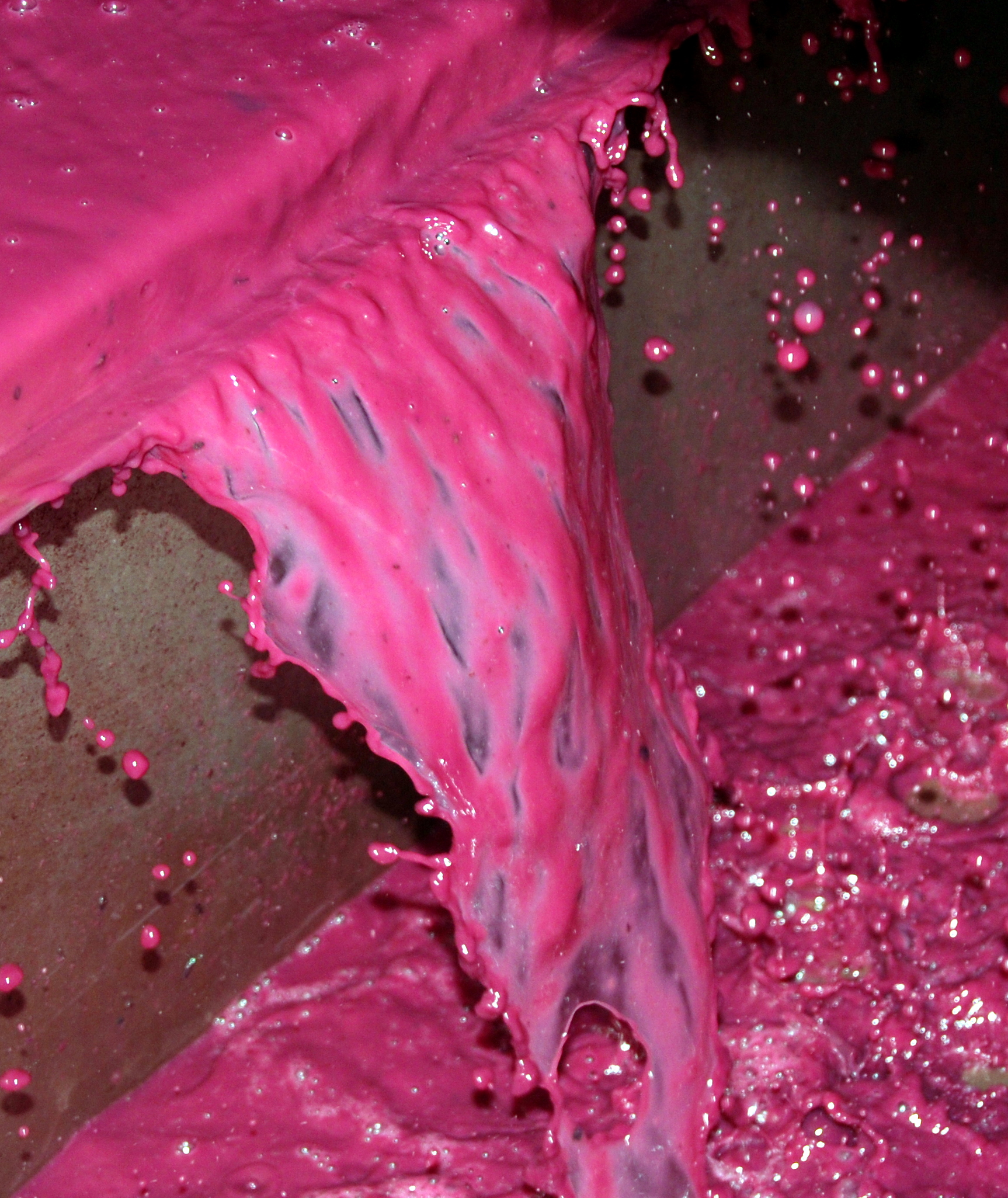
One method of making rosé is to press the wine early (often after 12–24 hours of skin contact) while red wine producers will leave the juice macerating with the skins for several days or even weeks longer.

=== Saignée ===
The saignée (French: [sɛɲe]; French for "bleed") method is the practice of removing ("bleeding off") some of the juice from the must in order to more deeply concentrate the phenolics, color, and flavor of the red wine. It has a long history of use in the French wine regions of Bordeaux and Burgundy but wasn't always used for rosé production. For some red winemakers, the juice bleed off is simply poured down the drain or used as "topping wine" to fill the ullage (the headspace of barrels and tanks) during storage. Its use in rosé production is sometimes considered an afterthought, as a way to increase cash-flow by producing a second wine to a primary red wine that can be released much sooner and available to market. While many wineries have been able to produce critically acclaimed rosé using the saignée method, its use has provoked criticism from wine personalities such as François Millo, president of the Provence Wine Council (CIVP) who claim that saignée method rosés are “not true rosés" because the bleeding process (which is not pressed with the must) is more of an afterthought.

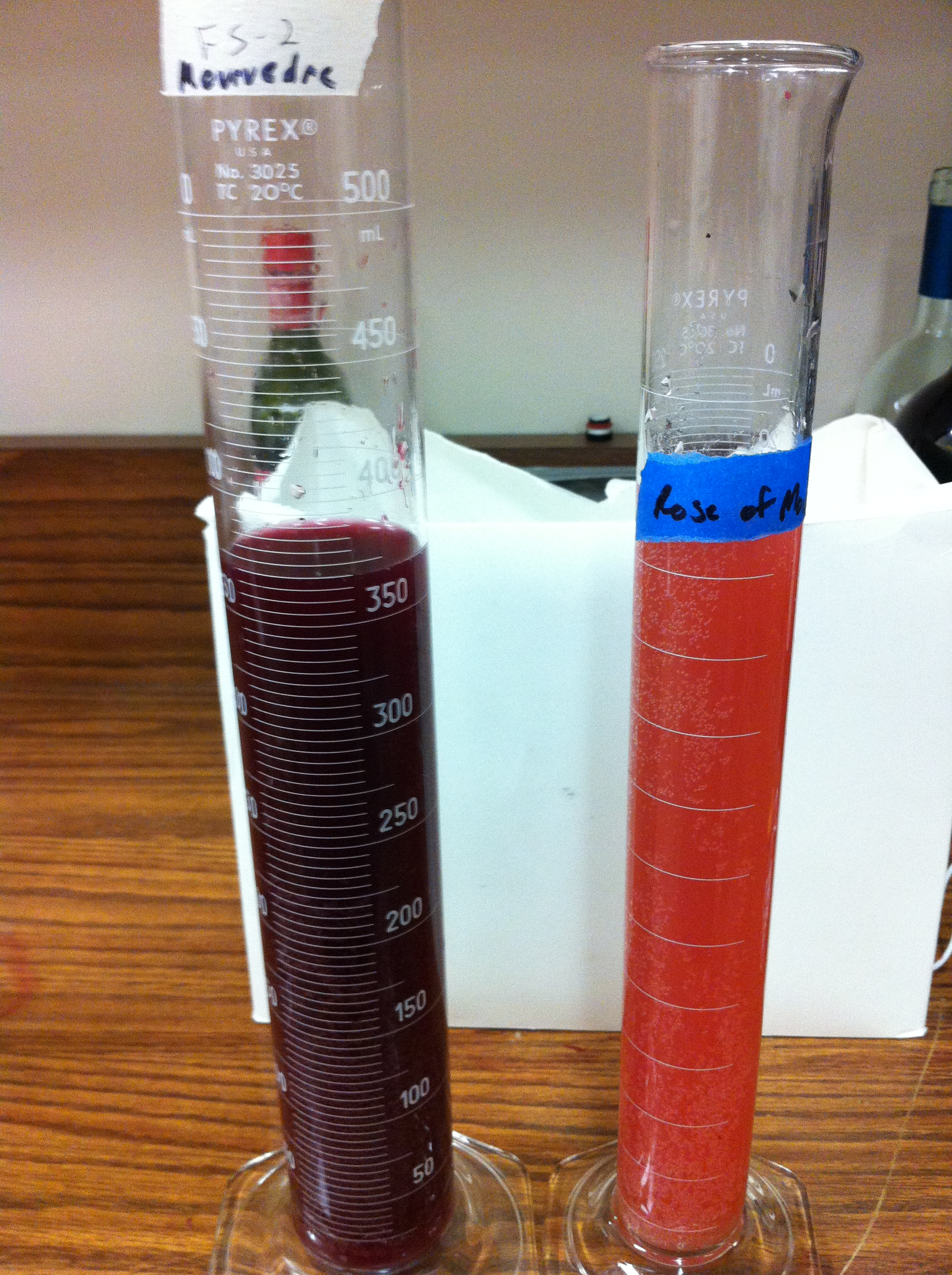
Sample of Mourvedre and rosé that had been bled off (saignée) from the red wine juice.

=== Vin gris ===
Unlike the maceration method which gives some, albeit very brief, time for the juice to be in contact with the skins vin gris are wines made from the immediate pressing of red skin grapes without any maceration time. Despite the name vin gris, the resulting juice is actually not grey but rather a very pale pink that is usually much lighter than traditionally made rosés using the limited maceration and saignée methods. Under French wine laws, wines labelled gris de gris must only be made from lightly tinted grape varieties such as Cinsault, Gamay and Grenache gris. The style is a specialty of the Lorraine Appellation d'Origine Contrôlée (AOC) Côtes de Toul made from Gamay and in Morocco where the orange-pink wine is made from a blend of Cinsault, Grenache and Cabernet Sauvignon.

=== Decolorization ===
Another method of producing rosé is to severely decolorize a red wine using absorbent charcoal such as activated carbon. This purer form of charcoal obtained by the dry distillation of carbon compounds (such as wood or peat) has a high ratio of surface area to weight that adsorbs color compounds as well as other phenolics and colloids in a wine. While it can be used to decolorize a wine, often much more than just color is stripped from the wine which makes this method very rarely used in the production of quality rosés.

== Color ==
With the exception of very few varieties, known as teinturiers, most wine grapes produce clear or colorless juice. This includes such well known red wine grape varieties such as Cabernet Sauvignon and Pinot noir. The color in red wine comes from phenolics in the skin called anthocyanins that react with other components in wine (such as tannins, acetaldehyde and pyruvic acid) to form polymeric pigments. The anthocyanins are extracted from the skin during the process of maceration which can last from a few hours in the case of some rosés (which usually only have 20–50 mg/L of anthocyanins) to several days in the case of most red wines (which often have in excess of 250 mg/L of anthocyanins).

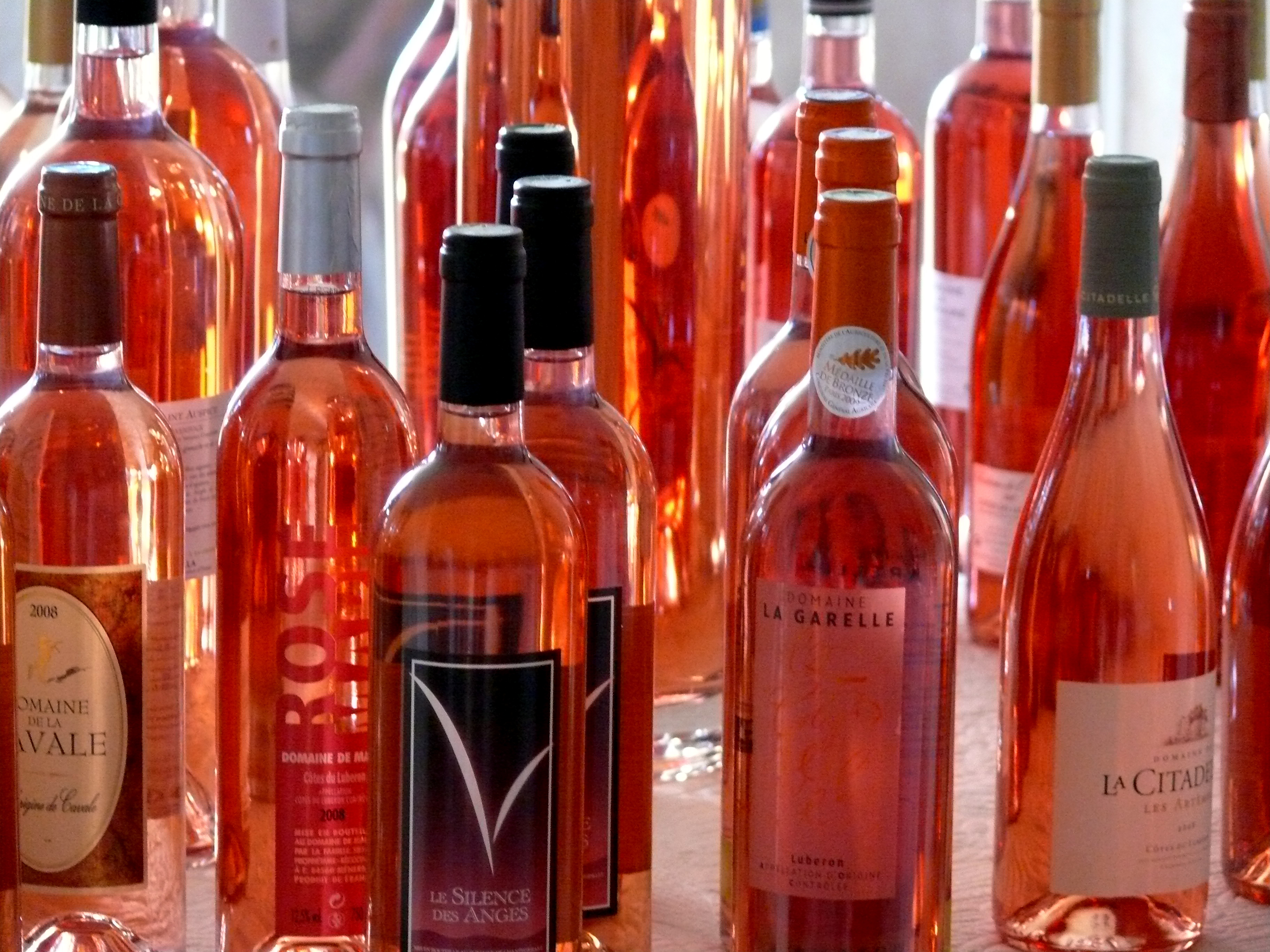
Rosés can come in a variety of colors depending on the grape variety and method of production.

Anthocyanins have the ability to change into three different forms—colorless, red and blue—depending on the pH/acidity levels of the solution they are in. At wine pH (typically 2.9-4.0), most of the grape anthocyanins are in the colorless form unless they have reacted with tannins or other molecules (such as tannins also extracted from the skin as well as grape seeds, stems and from oak wine barrels) to form a stabilized pigment. So producers wishing to make rosé work to not only limit the amount of anthocyanins extracted into the wine but also limit the wine's exposure to tannins (either by less maceration time, gentle pressing of the grapes or using only stainless tanks instead of oak) as well as protective anti-oxidative winemaking techniques that limit the development of acetaldehyde and other browning pigments that could add color to the wine.

According to Conseil Interprofessionnel des Vins de Provence in France, rosés in Provence display one of the different colors: melon (cantaloupe), peach, redcurrant, grapefruit, mango, mandarin.

Many studies have shown that the color of wine influences consumers' perceptions about the wine. While these studies have shown that consumers tend to prefer on visual inspection the darker rosés, in blind taste tests where color could not be visually discerned (such as using black wine glasses), often consumers preferred the lighter-colored rosés.

For these reasons, many rosé winemakers are mindful of the color quality of their rosé and make winemaking decisions based on this factor. This includes the extent of maceration, whether or not to do a saignee from a darker red wine and even to do a color adjustment by blending in some finished red wine in order to reach the desired color.

== Aromas and flavors ==
Many of the aroma and flavor components in wine are located in the skin of the grape. The length of maceration (where the must is in contact with the skin) will influence how much of these compounds are extracted and available in the wine.

The aromas and flavor of rosés are primarily influenced by the particular grape varieties used to produce the wine, but the method of production also plays an important part. The light, fruity character of many rosés come from volatile thiols that are found as flavor precursors in the grape skins. The most prominent of these are 3-mercaptohexanol-1-ol and 3-mercaptohenyl acetate. These are extracted from the grape skins during maceration but are less likely to be extracted at temperatures below 20 °C (68 °F). As a result, producers doing a "cold soak" maceration (with much lower temperature) to limit microbial and oxidative activity may extract less of these compounds. During fermentation, other flavor components such as the esters phenethyl acetate and isoamyl acetate also form and contribute to a wine's aromas.

The stability of these aromas is very dependent on the amount of anthocyanins and other phenolics that protect these compounds from oxidation. One of the reasons why rosés have a very limited shelf-life is because of their low phenolic levels due to the very limited skin contact and extraction time. Within a year of production, the level of 3-mercaptohexanol-1-ol in the wine has usually dropped to half its fermentation level, with the presence of 3-mercaptohenyl acetate undetectable in most wines. This is why most wine experts recommend that rosés be consumed as soon after release as possible.

== French rosés ==
France is the top global producer of rosé, accounting for 35% of the world's supply. It also leads in consumption, with one-third of the wine consumed in the country being rosé. Many of the earliest red wines produced in such notable wine regions as Bordeaux, Burgundy and Champagne were "rosé-style" wines made from juice that had only brief periods of skin contact during winemaking. But even as the trend in these regions evolved towards more modern ideas of "red wines", rosés still hold a prominent place in many of France's major wine regions. Today rosé is produced throughout France from the cooler climate rosé Champagnes and Loire Valley wines to the warm Mediterranean influence climates of Provence and the southern Rhone Valley.

=== Provence ===
Rosés account for vast majority of Provence's wine production, ranging from half to almost two thirds of all the wine produced in the region. Over the period between 2010 and 2024, exports of rosé from Provence have surged by about 500%. The rosés of Provence are often known for their food and wine pairing matches with the local Mediterranean cuisine of the region, particularly the garlicky aioli sauces and tangy bouillabaisse stews that are the hallmark of Provençal cuisine.

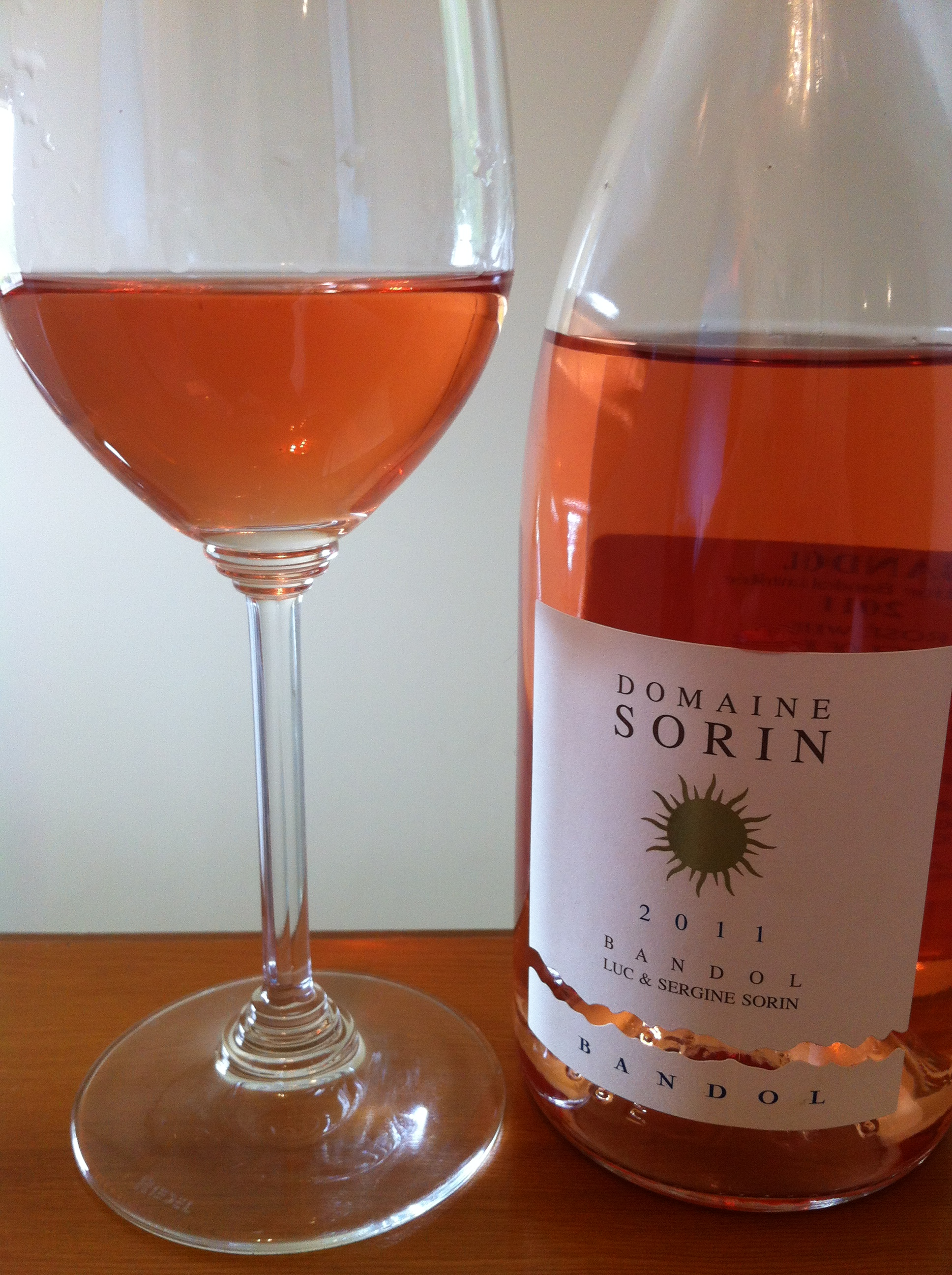
A rosé from Bandol

The large Cotes de Provence AOC includes 85 communes between the towns of Nice and Marseille and is responsible for nearly 75% of all Provençal wine with rosés alone accounting for 80% of that total. Grenache is the dominant grape of the region, comprising at least 60% of the blend with Syrah, Cinsault, Mourvedre, Tibouren, Carignan and Cabernet Sauvignon playing supporting roles.

The Coteaux d'Aix-en-Provence AOC is the second largest AOC in Provence, covering 50 communes in the west and northwestern part of the region. Here rosé accounts for around 35% of the AOC's production with Grenache, Cinsault and Mourvedre being the dominant varieties and Counoise, Carignan, Syrah and Cabernet Sauvignon rounding out the blends.

Located in the hilly central region of Provence, rosés account for almost two-thirds of the production in the Coteaux Varois AOC. Here the wines are blends of Grenache, Syrah and Mourvedre accounting for at least 80% of the wine with Cinsault, Cabernet Sauvignon and Carignan permitted to fill in the remainder.

The Bandol AOC in southwest Provence is dominated by the late-ripening Mourvedre grape which produces well in the limestone, silicon rich stony soils of the region. While the AOC produces mostly red wines, at least 33% of its yearly production is made up of rosé wines with Grenache, Cinsault, Syrah and Carignan playing supporting roles to Mourvedre.

Around the city of Nice in southeast Provence is Bellet AOC where the hot summers is tempered by the cooling sea coast breeze off the Mediterranean. Here rosé is made in roughly equal proportions with the red wines made from Braquet, Folle Noire, Grenache and Cinsault.

=== Tavel ===
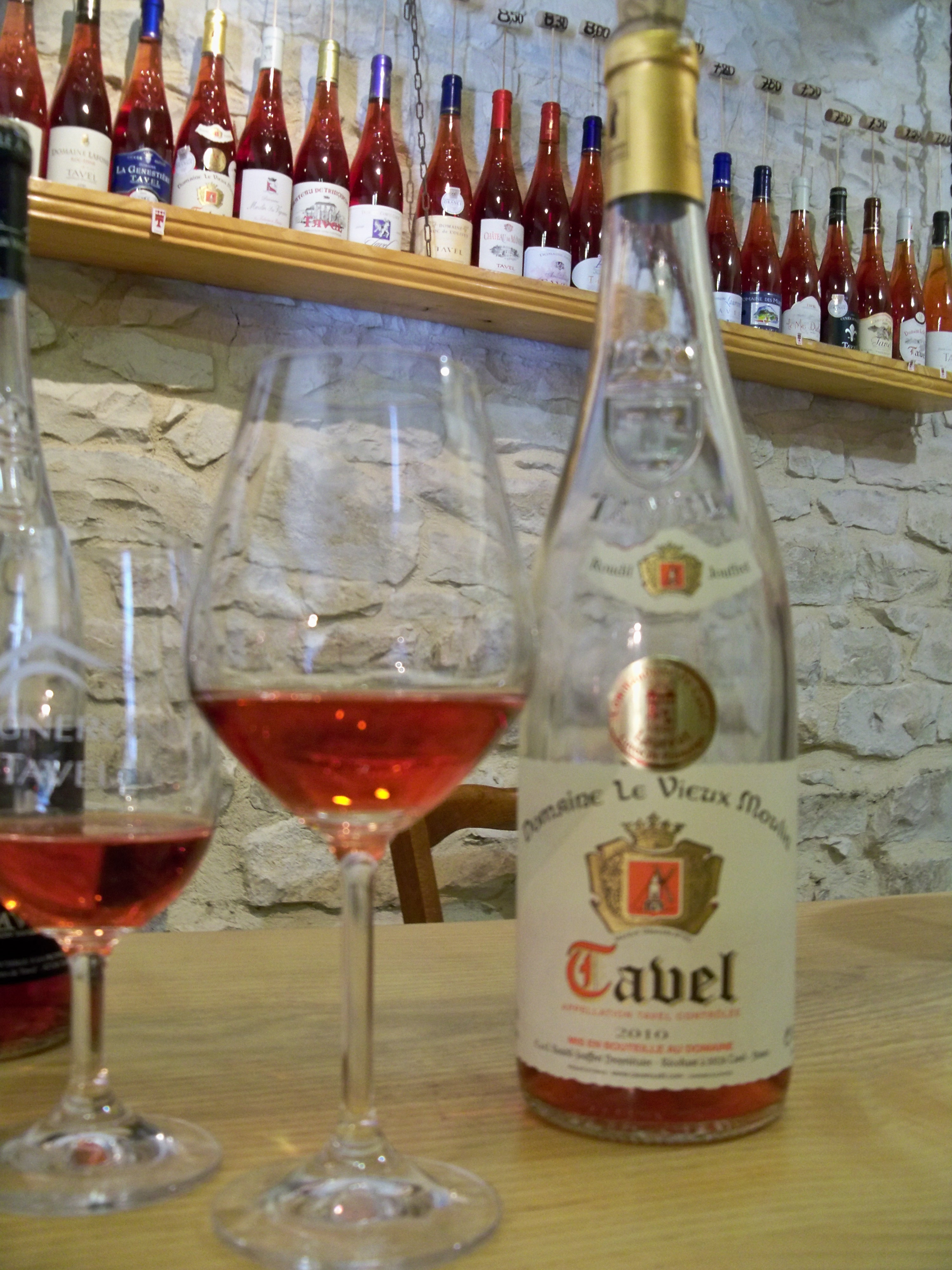
A Tavel rosé

While most of the southern Rhône Valley is dominated by red wines, rosé is the only permitted wine style made in the Tavel AOC with more than half of the AOC production done by the local winemakers' co-operative. According to wine expert Karen MacNeil, the Tavel is "southern France's self-styled capital of rosé". This is due, in part, to its long history of rosé production and its proximity to the tourist-rich regions of southern France where, like Provençal rosé, Tavel is often served at beach-side cafes overlooking the Mediterranean.

Located 10 miles southwest of the Châteauneuf-du-Pape AOC, just across the Rhône River, the AOC has more than 950 ha (2347 acres) planted. The wines of Tavel are dominated by the southern wine grape Grenache which makes up to 60% of the blend. Under AOC laws the remaining blend must be at least 15% Cinsault with the remainder of the wine permitted to include Carignan, Syrah, Bourboulenc, Calitor, Mourvedre and Picpoul.

While Tavel rosé can be made using the saignee and skin-contact method, the tradition in the region is to do a type of co-ferment with both red and white grapes that combines elements of both methods. The grapes are loaded, whole clusters, into a tank all together where under the gravity of their own weight the grapes are gently pressed and the juice trickles down to the bottom. There the juice receives its period of brief skin contact with the crushed red skins on the bottom before the lightly colored free-run juice is then drained off, like a saignee, and the wine then fermented as normal. This method produces what Karen MacNeil describes as "rugged wines with robust, spicy berry flavor."

==== Other Rhône rosés ====
Outside of Tavel, rosés are produced in some significant quantities in the Gigondas AOC on the eastern side of the Rhône valley. Here at least 15% of the wine must be made from Syrah and Mourvedre with Grenache permitted to make up to 80% of the blend and Cinsault and Carignan playing minor roles. Next door to the south in the Vacqueyras AOC rosés only account for around 4% of the yearly production using the same grapes as Gigondas.

Across the river from Châteauneuf-du-Pape just north of Tavel is the Lirac AOC which, like it southern neighbor, has a long history of exporting dry rosé wines to the United States and United Kingdom. While often overshadowed by neighboring Tavel, some critics, such as wine expert Oz Clarke, describe them as having noticeable strawberry notes and being "breezier, more refreshing" than its more prominent neighbor. However, rosés usually account for less than a fifth of this region's yearly production. Here in the sandy soil on the banks of the Rhône, Grenache makes up to 40% of the blend with Cinsault, Mourvedre, Syrah and Carignan making up the remainder.

=== Loire ===
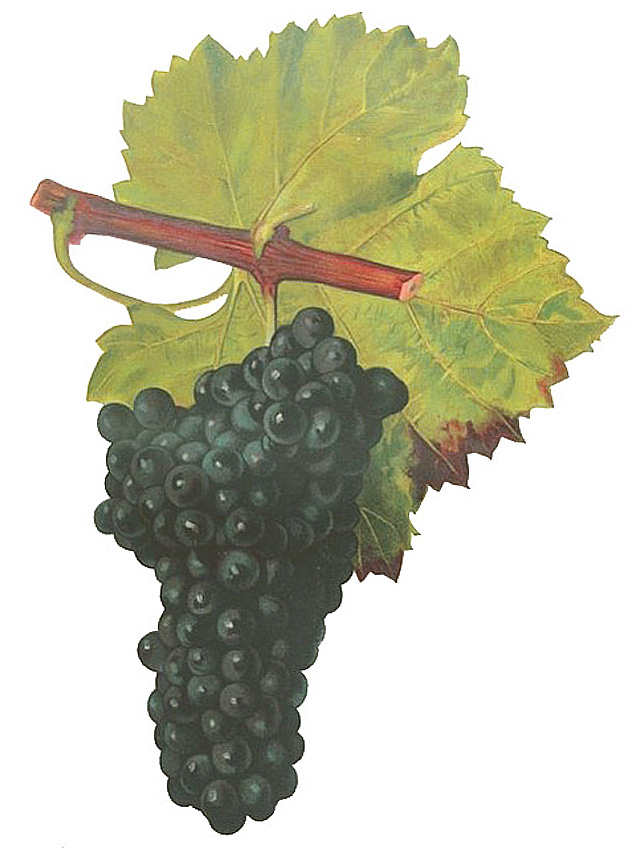
Rosé d'Anjou is made primarily from the Groslot grape.

Rosé making has a long history in the Loire valley, particularly in the Anjou wine region around the town of Angers where two AOCs, Rosé d'Anjou and Cabernet d'Anjou exist. The former, made from the Groslot (Grolleau) grapes that are often harvested to very high yields around 50 hl/ha, tends to be lighter and often sweet. The latter, made from Cabernet Franc and Cabernet Sauvignon, is often drier (though some styles can be sweet), with grapes that are limited to smaller harvests of no more than 40 hl/ha. Cabernet d'Anjou are usually noted for their high acidity levels that give these rosé the rather unusual capability of being able to age for a decade or more.

For most of the 20th century, the sweeter Rosé d'Anjou was the most prominent Rosé but even as the trend of consumers moving to more drier versions of rosé, the AOC still produces an estimated 18 million bottles of wine a year. In addition to Groslot, Gamay and Malbec are also permitted varieties in the wine.

A larger Rosé de Loire appellation exist that includes wines made from Anjou, Saumur and Touraine. Cabernet grapes must account for at least 30% of the blend with Groslot, Pineau d'Aunis, Pinot noir and Gamay permitted to fill out the rest of the blend. According to wine expert Jancis Robinson, the wines are always dry with a quality level that falls somewhere between Rosé d'Anjou and Cabernet d'Anjou. Wine expert Karen MacNeil describes well made examples of Rosé de Loire as being fruity with light cherry flavors and moderate acidity.

=== Champagne ===
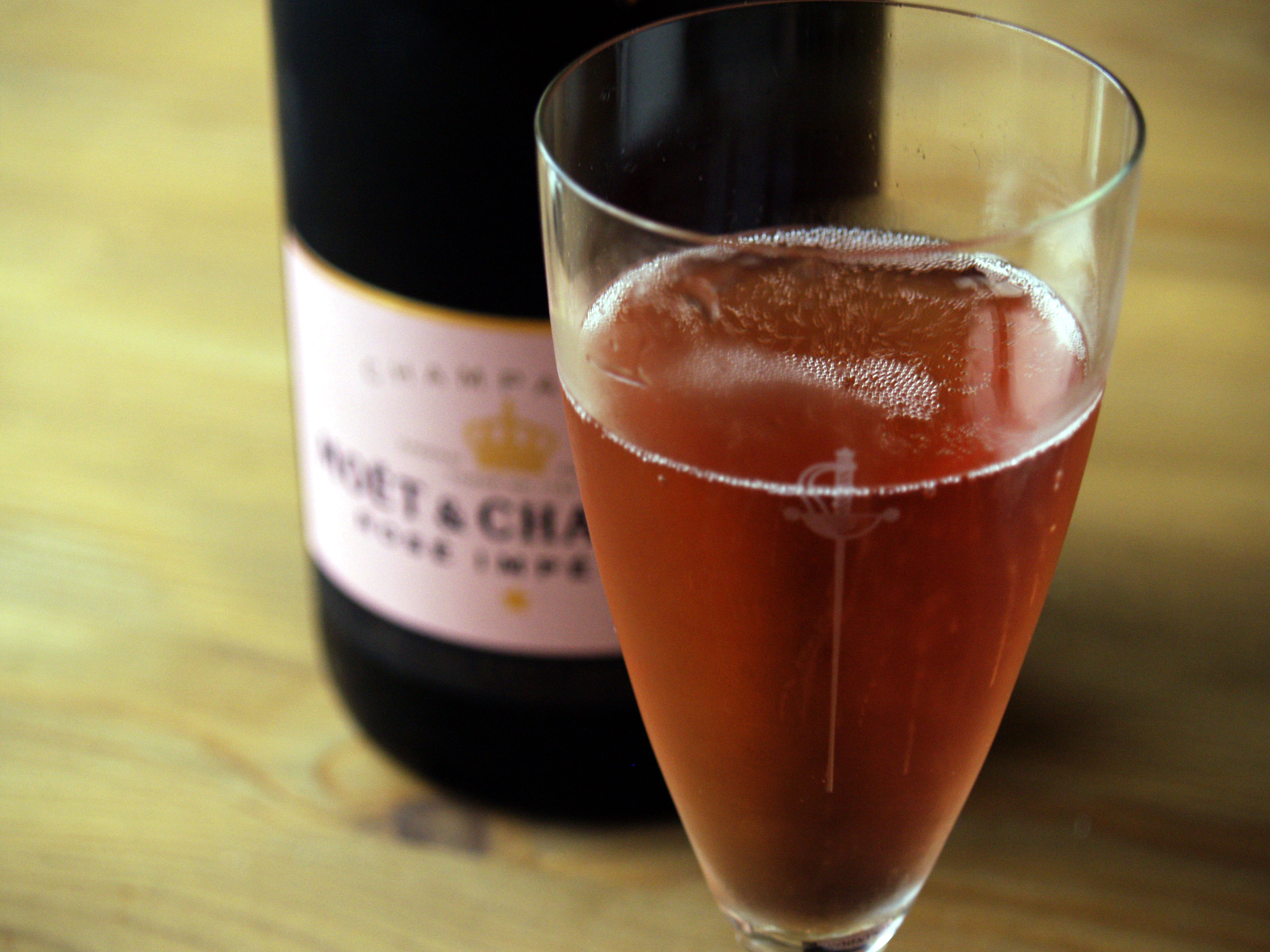
A sparkling rosé wine, e.g. Champagne, can range in color from pink to copper.

Rosé Champagnes account for between 3-5% of Champagne's yearly production. These Champagnes are distinct from Blanc de noirs (white of blacks or white from black grapes) in that rosé Champagnes are often noticeably and intentionally colored, with hues that span from "baby pink" to copper salmon, while Blanc de noirs are white wines with only sometimes the palest of coloring that could range from a "white-grey" to a light salmon. This color traditionally comes from the very brief skin contact of the black grapes (Pinot noir and Pinot Meunier) during pressing that the Champagne producer decides not to remove by any decolorizing techniques. However, many modern rosé Champagnes are produced as regular Champagnes but are later "colored up" by adding red Pinot noir wines to the finished wine. According to wine expert Karen MacNeil, some Champagne producers believe this second method adds more richness and age-ability to the wine.

In the Aube department, a separate AOC for still rosé produced around the commune of Riceys was established for rosé produced by the saignee method from exclusively Pinot noir. Produced only during the warmest, ripest vintages of Champagne (with often less than 7500 bottles made on average), Rosé des Riceys can be difficult to find. According to wine expert Jancis Robinson, Rosé des Riceys can be some of France's "most serious rosés" while fellow wine expert Oz Clarke describes them as "oddball" wines that come across as full-bodied and nutty with a golden pink color.

=== Other French regions ===
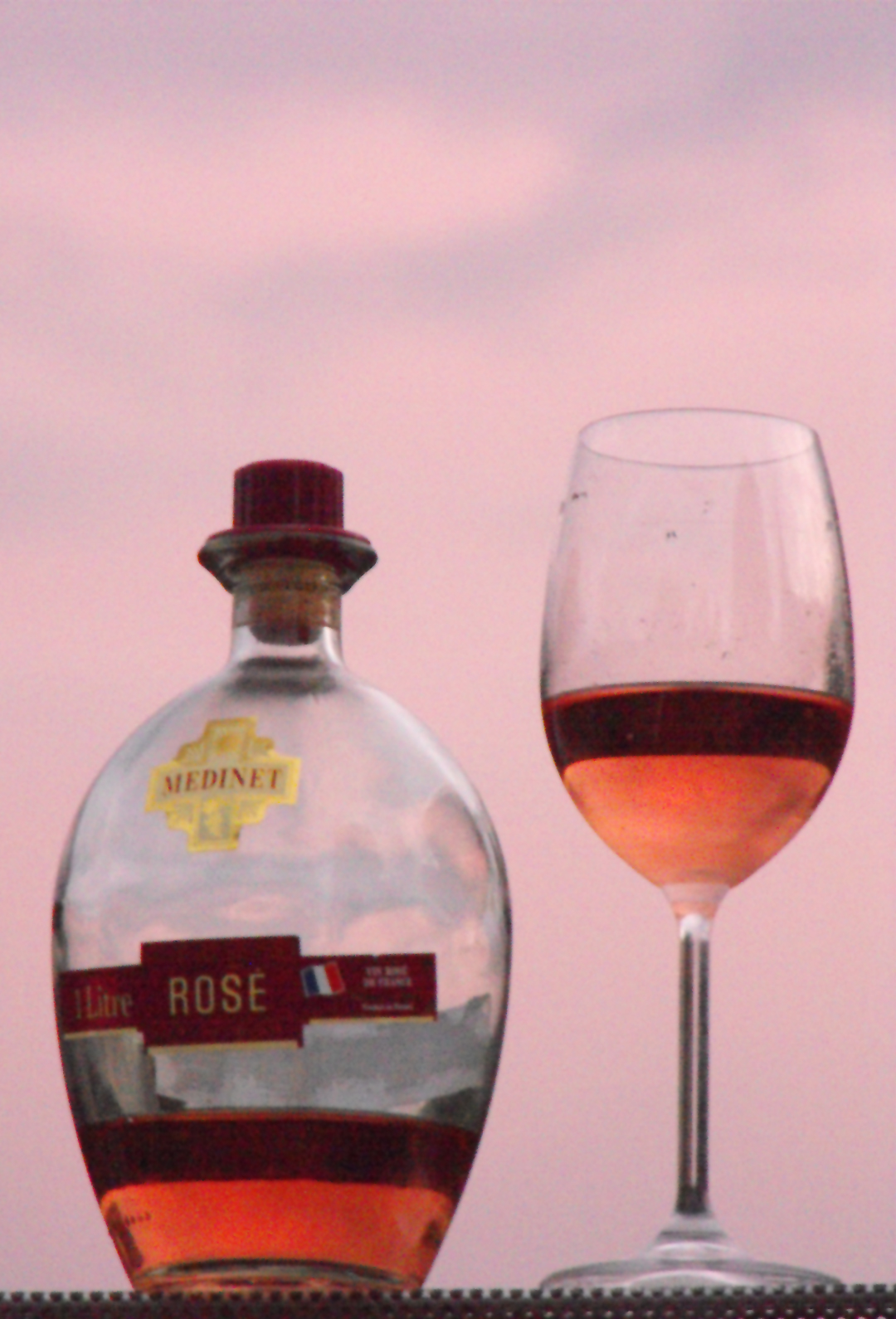
A French rosé in a one-liter squat bottle

In Languedoc-Roussillon, the largest producer of rosé wine in France, rosés are made in many ways and from most common rosé wine grape varieties. This is due to the large use of the PGI appellation system. In the Jura wine region, the Arbois AOC makes very pale, pink red wines that are often mistaken for rosés from Pinot noir and the local Poulsard and Trousseau varieties. But the region also makes even paler actual rosés from the same grape varieties that are pressed after only a few hours of skin contact. In Beaujolais rosés are made from the Gamay grape using the same carbonic maceration techniques as the red wines except that the free-run juice that is released by the weight of the whole berry grapes in the tank is periodically drained off throughout the process to avoid extracting too much color and phenolics. In Bordeaux, rosé production is permitted in most AOC using the same varieties as the region's well known reds—Cabernet Sauvignon, Merlot, Cabernet franc, Malbec, Petit Verdot and Carmenere.

== Other European rosés ==
=== Italy ===
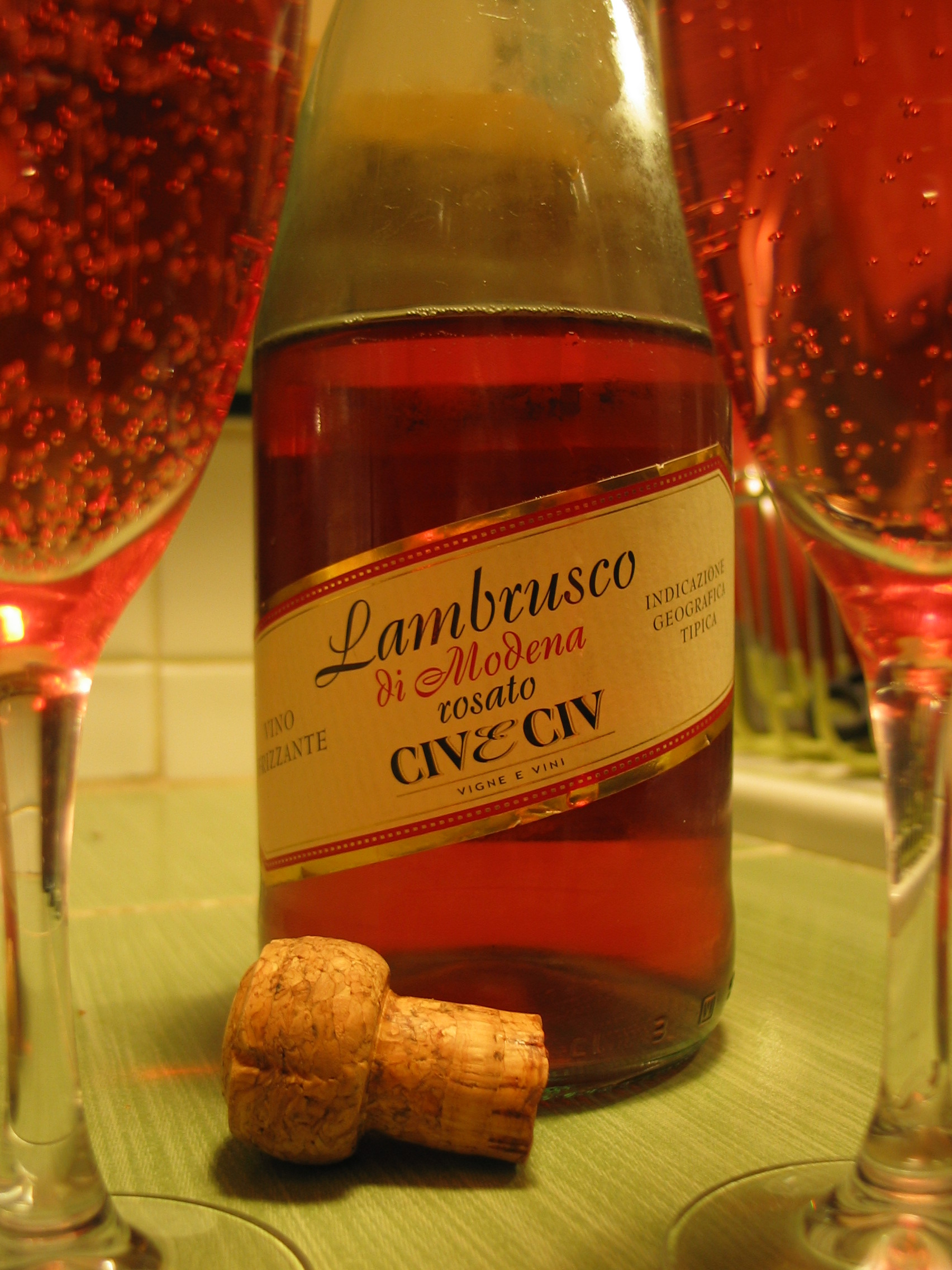
A slightly sparkling Lambrusco rosé

Like France, rosés are made throughout Italy with the style and grape varieties used changing depending on the region and local climate. The long history of Italian rosés, particularly in the warm southern part of the country, stem from difficulties in the early days of winemaking to make dark, fully colored dry red wines without temperature controlled fermentation vessels. As the must macerated with the skins, the intense heat of the process would often kill the yeast resulting in a stuck fermentation and residual sugar in the remaining wine. Eventually Italian winemakers realized that if they pressed the wines early in the process, remaining the skins, they could complete the fermentation albeit with a lightly colored wine.

The Italians have several terms for rosé style wines beginning with the term rosato that is a permitted wine style in several Denominazione di origine controllata. These wine tend to be very pale in color with slightly dark wines (but not dark enough to be considered a rosso or red wine) being labeled as Chiaretto. Ramato, a specialty in the Veneto, are copper-colored rosés made from pink-skinned Pinot grigio grape that are allowed a period of extended maceration.

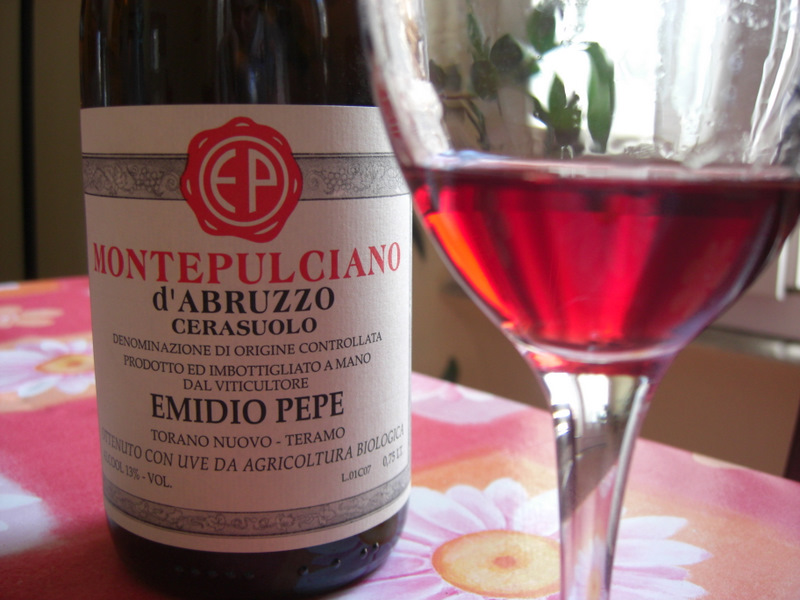
A Cerasuolo rosè wine made from the Montepulciano grape in the Abruzzo region

The term Cerasuolo (meaning "cherry red") describes a vividly wine colored rosé and is seen frequently in the Abruzzo region where rosé made in the Montepulciano d'Abruzzo region from deeply pigmented Montepulciano grape are given a special designation within the DOC.

Today, Italian rosés are most often made by the short maceration method though some regions do have a tradition of blending red and white wine grapes together to make a lightly colored wine. According to wine expert Oz Clarke, northeast Italy (which includes the Veneto wine, Friuli-Venezia Giulia and Trentino-Alto Adige/Südtirol (wine)), tends to make "delicate rosés" while warmer southern Italy (which includes Calabria, Apulia and Sicily) makes fuller bodied and "fairly gutsy dry rosés".

In the Valle d'Aosta DOC, locals refer to the indigenous grape Premetta as a rosato naturale due to the extremely thin and lightly pigmented skins of the variety that even with extended maceration can only produce a very pale rosé wine. According to wine experts Joe Bastianich and David Lynch, Valle d'Aosta Premetta rosés are very fruity with strawberry aromas and spicy cinnamon notes.

==== Occhio di Pernice ====
In Tuscany, there is a tradition of producing a sweet rosato version of Vin Santo. Usually made with white grapes, such as Trebbiano, these dessert wines are made from the red Sangiovese grape and are called Occhio di Pernice (meaning "eye of the partridge", from French œil de perdrix). While traditionally produced in the Chianti DOC region, these wines are produced throughout Tuscany including the Carmignano DOC (the Carmignano DOCG is used for red wines only), Montecarlo DOC, Cortona DOC, Bolgheri and Elba DOCs.

=== Germany, Austria, Switzerland ===
In Germany, several regions are noted for their distinct style of rosé (German rosewein or roseewein). Several terms are used to denote these different styles depending on how the wine was made, from what grapes and in what region. The term Weißherbst is a type of German rosé made from a single variety of grape with that particular variety needing to be denoted on the wine label. Rotling refers to a rosé that is either made from multiple grape varieties that can either be all red wine varieties or a mixture of white and red grape varieties. This designation is required on all Tafelwein (table wine), Landwein ("country wine" similar to the French vin de pays) and Qualitätswein bestimmter Anbaugebiete (QbA) level but its presence on the label is optional for Prädikatswein (the highest classification of German wine).

In the Baden region, Badisch Rotgold is a specialty rosé made from Spätburgunder (Pinot noir) and Ruländer (Pinot gris). Under German wine law the wine must be made to at least QbA level (meaning the grapes must be harvested with a ripeness level of at least 51°Oe to 72°Oe. A specialty of the Rems Valley in nearby Württemberg region is a style of wine known as Schillerwein. Produced in the area for over 300 years, Schillerwein is made from pressing and co-fermenting red and white grape varieties together. While not always a rosé, the color of Schillerwein range from dark red to pale pink depending on the grape varieties and percentage of each used in the blend.

In Austria, Styria is known for a particular type of rosé called Schilcher that is made from the indigenous Blauer Wildbacher grape that is rarely grown outside of western Styria. The wine is noted for it fruity flavor and high levels of acidity.

In the eastern regions of Switzerland, near the German and Austria borders, a special style of rosé known as Süssdruck is produced using only the free-run juice of Pinot noir. It is known as Oeil de perdrix from Switzerland.

=== Spanish rosado ===
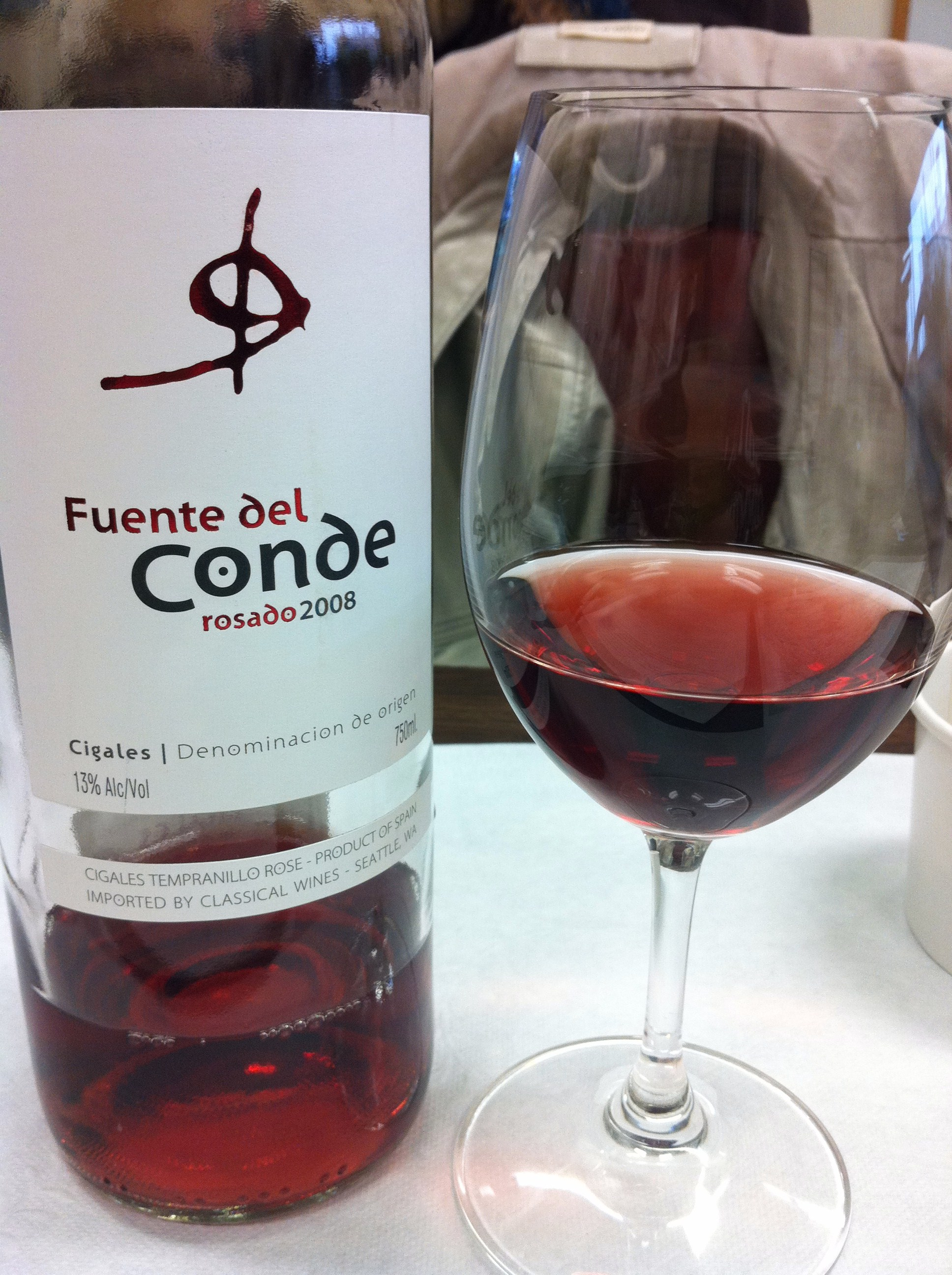
A rosado from the Cigales region

In Spain, rosés are known as rosado and are produced throughout the country with the Navarra DO, north of Rioja being the most noted region. Even today, more than half of Navarra's wine production is dedicated to rosados made primarily from the Garnacha (Grenache) grape. Other varieties that can be used for rosados in Navarra include Graciano, Tempranillo, Cabernet Sauvignon, Merlot and Carignan.

In the Alicante and Jumilla DOs the winemakers made their red wines and rosados using a method that is almost the reverse of the saignee method (where rosé juice is bled off the red wine). This method, known as the doble pasta (meaning "double paste") takes the skins from the early pressed rosé wine and adds them to the red wine (similar to the Italian ripasso method). The rosados are made like normal with a light, fruity style while the red wines made with the extra skins are darker in color and more deeply concentrated.

Other Spanish wine regions noted for their rosados include the denominaciones de origen (DOs) of Utiel-Requena, Yecla, Txakoli, Cigales, Tierra de Leon and Ribera del Duero.

=== Portugal ===
In 1942, a winemaker from Vinho Verde, Fernando Van Zeller Guedes, was inspired by the sales success that the lightly sparkling wine from his home region was having in Portugal and Brazil. He decided to try making a more fully sparkling rosé that was sweetened to appeal to the mass European and North American markets. At the end of World War II, production of Guedes' wine, Mateus, named after the Mateus Palace in the Vila Real Municipality, was in full operation with sales steadily climbing. By the 1980s, both the red and sparkling white versions of Mateus accounted for over 40% of the entire Portuguese wine industry, with worldwide sales of 3.25 million cases. However, sales of Mateus eventually started to decline, and though it still being produced, with Mateus introducing a Tempranillo sparkling rosé in 2005, it is not quite the dominating force in the market that it once was.

The history of Lancers, the other, notable Portuguese sparkling rosé that rose up after World War II, is quite similar to Mateus. The winemaking family of José Maria da Fonseca in the Setúbal DOC, one of the oldest Portuguese wine producers, received word from a distributor in New York City about American servicemen returning from Europe having a taste for many of the new wines they tried on their tours. In 1944, Fonseca released Lancers in a distinctive stone crock. Today, the wine is fully sparkling, using the "continuous method" of fermentation in large stainless steel tanks instead of individual wine bottles. While its rival, Mateus, is mostly still found in Europe, Lancers has remained in the North American market.

== New World rosés ==
=== White Zinfandels and blushes ===
While there have been rosés made in the European style throughout the American winemaking history, it wasn't until the end of the 20th century that "pink wines" became a truly significant segment of the American wine market. In what has been described by wine experts such as Jancis Robinson as a "marketing triumph", California winemaker Bob Trinchero of Sutter Home salvaged a stuck fermentation of his 1972 red Zinfandel wine by releasing a paler, sweeter rosé colored wine that he labeled as "White Zinfandel". Though he wasn't the first Californian winemaker to make a rosé version of Zinfandel, he was the first to aggressively market it as a new wine style. Consequently, Sutter Home saw sales of "White Zin" soar from 25,000 cases in 1980 to more than 1.5 million in 1986. The wine became so popular that it actually saved old vine Zinfandel plantings that were in danger of being uprooted and replanted with more "marketable" international varieties, and even encouraged newer plantings.

The term "blush" also originated in the 1970s when wine writer Jerry Mead visited the Sonoma County winery Mill Creek Vineyards and sampled a pale, pinkish wine that the winery made from Cabernet Sauvignon. The winemaker was thinking of calling the wine "White Cabernet" but Mead suggested the term "blush" instead. However, by the 1980s, white wines were still extremely popular among American consumers. Seizing on this interest, makers of sweeter "blush" style rosés began affixing the terms "white" or "blanc" to the varietal name on their wine labels anyway—White Zinfandel, Cabernet Blanc, White Merlot, etc. Throughout the rest of the 20th century, these sweeter blush wines saw tremendous popularity among American consumers but their numbers had started to decline by the turn of the 21st century falling from representing 22% of all the wines consumed in the US market in 1997 to 15% in 2003.

Today, White Zinfandels are considered part of the "blush wine" category of noticeably sweet, pale pink wines that often have very slight carbonation to give the wine a balance of acidity and some "liveliness". Very often winemakers will blend aromatic varieties like Riesling, Gewürztraminer and Muscat to add to the fruity nose of the wine.

=== Long Island Rosés ===
Since the early 1990s, Long Island has begun to distinguish itself as a source of rosé, often producing dry rosé wines that model the rosé makers from southern France. The eastern end of Long Island has over 60 vineyards and wineries that produce a range of rosé wines.

== See also ==
- Clairet, a very dark rosé sometimes considered its own category of wine
- Rosé cider
- Frosé, a mixed drink consisting of rosé frozen to a slush, with strawberries, vodka and lemon juice
