= Grolleau (grape) =

Red French wine grape

- Grape (Vitis)
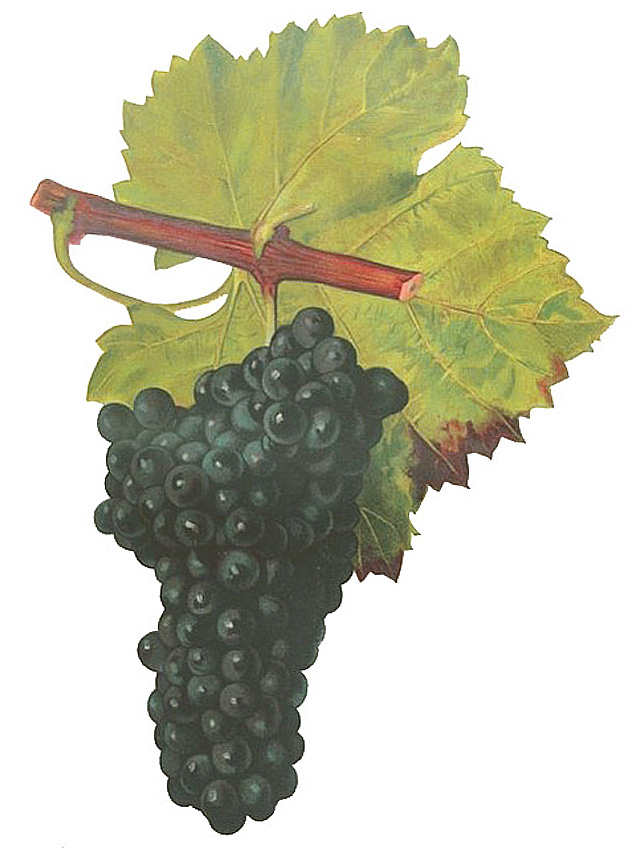
- Grolleau in Viala & Vermorel (as Groslot de Cinq Mars)
- Color of berry skin: Noir
- Species: Vitis vinifera
- Also called: See list of synonyms
- Origin: France
- Notable regions: Loire
- Notable wines: Rosé d'Anjou
- Hazards: Wind damage inconsistent quality
- VIVC number: 5073

Grolleau (French pronunciation: [ɡʁɔlo]), or Grolleau noir, is a red French wine grape variety that is grown primarily in the Loire Valley of France. The name is derived from the French word grolle, meaning "crow", and is said to reflect the deep black berries of the Grolleau vine. It is most commonly made into rosé wine, particularly in the Anjou region. Grolleau wines tend to have a low alcohol content and relatively high acidity.

== History ==
The first documented plantings of Grolleau occurred in the Charente region in the early 19th century. Ampelographers believe that the grape is likely related to the ancient variety Gouais blanc. The Grolleau vine's greatest popularity occurred during the mid- to late 20th century with the widespread marketing of Rosé d'Anjou wine, of which Grolleau was the principal component. Often blended with Gamay, Grolleau-based Rosé d'Anjou was a sweet wine. Towards the turn of the 21st century, Rosé d'Anjou (and by extension Grolleau), started to fall out of favor in lieu of the Cabernet Franc and Cabernet Sauvignon–dominated rosé Cabernet d'Anjou. By 2000 there were only 5,500 acres (2,200 hectares) of Grolleau planted in the Middle Loire.

The decline has been attributed, in part, to Grolleau's reputation for poor quality as noted by wine experts such as Jancis Robinson and Tom Stevenson. Wine critic Robert M. Parker, Jr., has taken a dim view of Grolleau's potential, recommending in his wine buying guide that growers in the Loire Valley should rip up all Grolleau vines and replace them with grape varieties that have more potential for quality wine production such as Gamay and Cabernet Franc.

== Wine regions ==
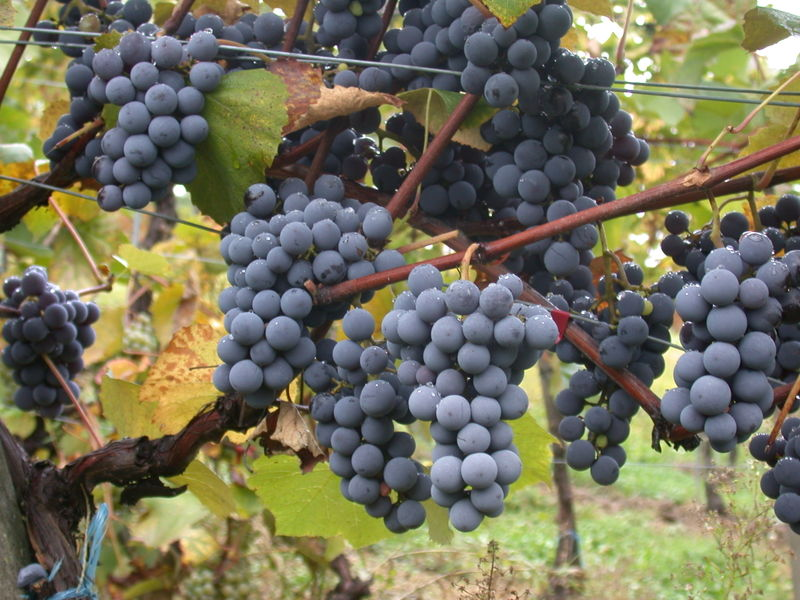
Grolleau is often blended with Gamay (pictured) and some wine experts are recommending that plantings of Grolleau be ripped out and replaced with more Gamay vines.

The Grolleau vine is found mostly in the Middle Loire region where it is a permitted grape variety for the rosé Appellation d'origine contrôlée (AOC)s of Anjou, Touraine and Saumur AOC. The grape is limited to just rosé wines and is not permitted by AOC regulations into the red blends of these regions. It is also permitted as an ingredient in the sparkling wines of the Cremant de Loire, Anjou AOC and Saumur AOC.

== Viticulture ==
Grolleau is a high yielding grapevine that ripens reliably and relatively early for the cool climate Loire Valley-often right after Gamay. The vine produces medium-sized clusters clinging to the vine via its long, slender pedicels. The grapes are thin skinned with few phenolic compounds, but after veraison they produce color ranging from gray to bluish/black depending on the clone. There are currently five clones of the Grolleau vine authorized for viticulture in France. The vine tends to bud early which renders it susceptible to damage from spring frosts. Its long branches make its susceptible to wind damage, requiring that it be planted near hillside shelter. Grolleau is sensitive to several grape diseases including excoriose and stem rot.

== Wines ==
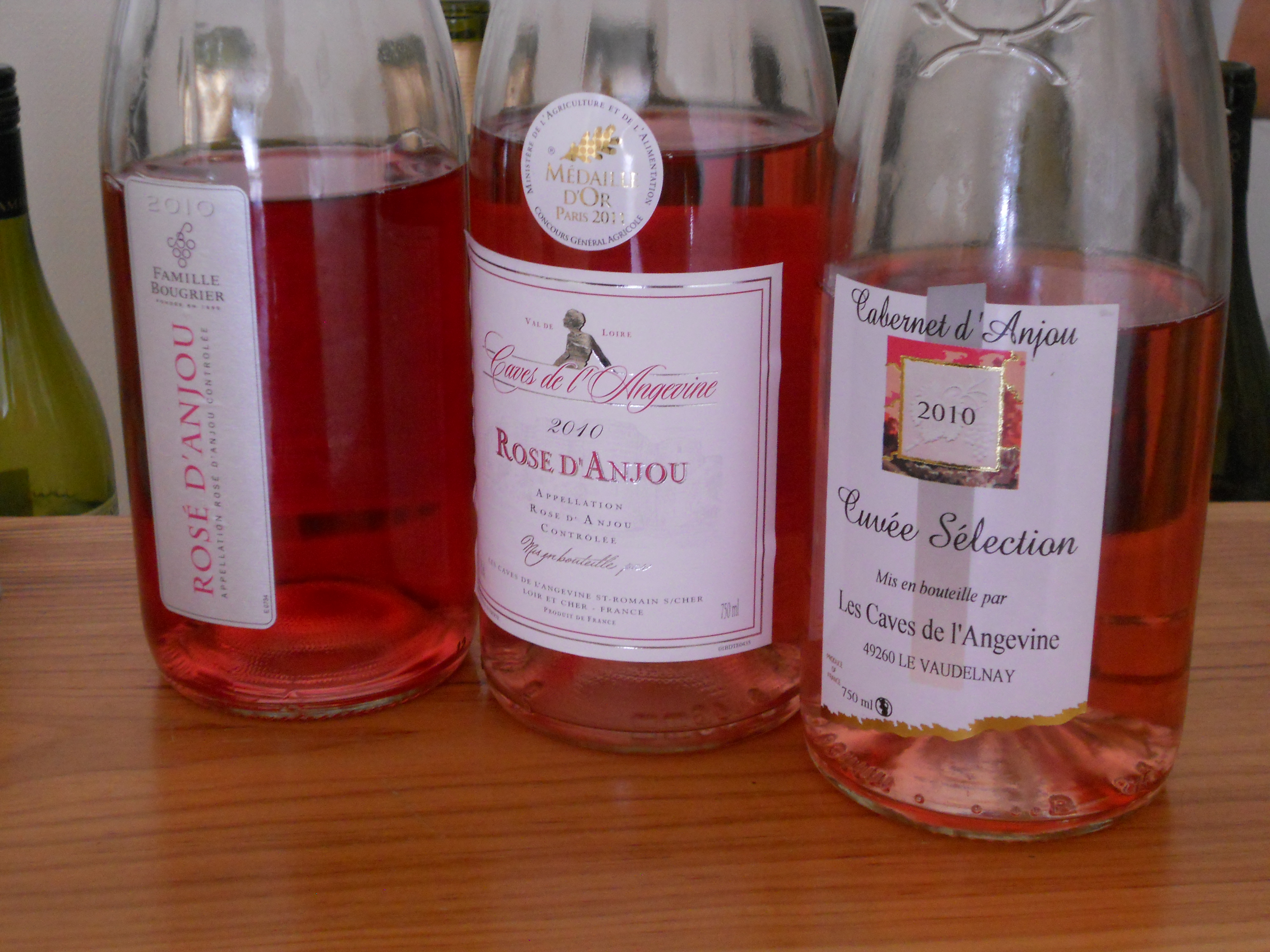
Bottles of Rosé d'Anjou with Cabernet d'Anjou

Grolleau produces light bodied, fairly neutral wines with noticeably high acidity. It is often produced in off-dry to medium sweet style, leaving some sugars in the wine to balance with the acidity.

== Grolleau gris ==
Grolleau gris is the pink-skinned mutation of Grolleau noir planted primarily in the Loire Valley. It is used mainly for the white wines of the Vin de Pays du Jardin de la France.

== Synonyms ==
Grolleau is also known under the synonyms Bourdalès, Franc noir, Gamay de Châtillon (in Savennières), Gamay-Groslot, Gloire de Tours, Grolleau de Cinq-Mars, Grolleau de Touraine, Grolleau de Tours, Grolleau noir, Grolo Chernyi, Grolot noir, Groslot, Groslot de Cinq-Mars, Groslot de Valère, Groslot de Vallères, Moinard, Moinard Grolleau, Neri, Noir de Saumur, Pineau de Saumur, Plant Boisnard, Plant Mini, and Rosé d'Anjou.

Grolleau gris is also known under the synonyms Grolleau, Groslot de la Thibaudière, and Groslot gris.
