= José Maria da Fonseca =

Portuguese winery

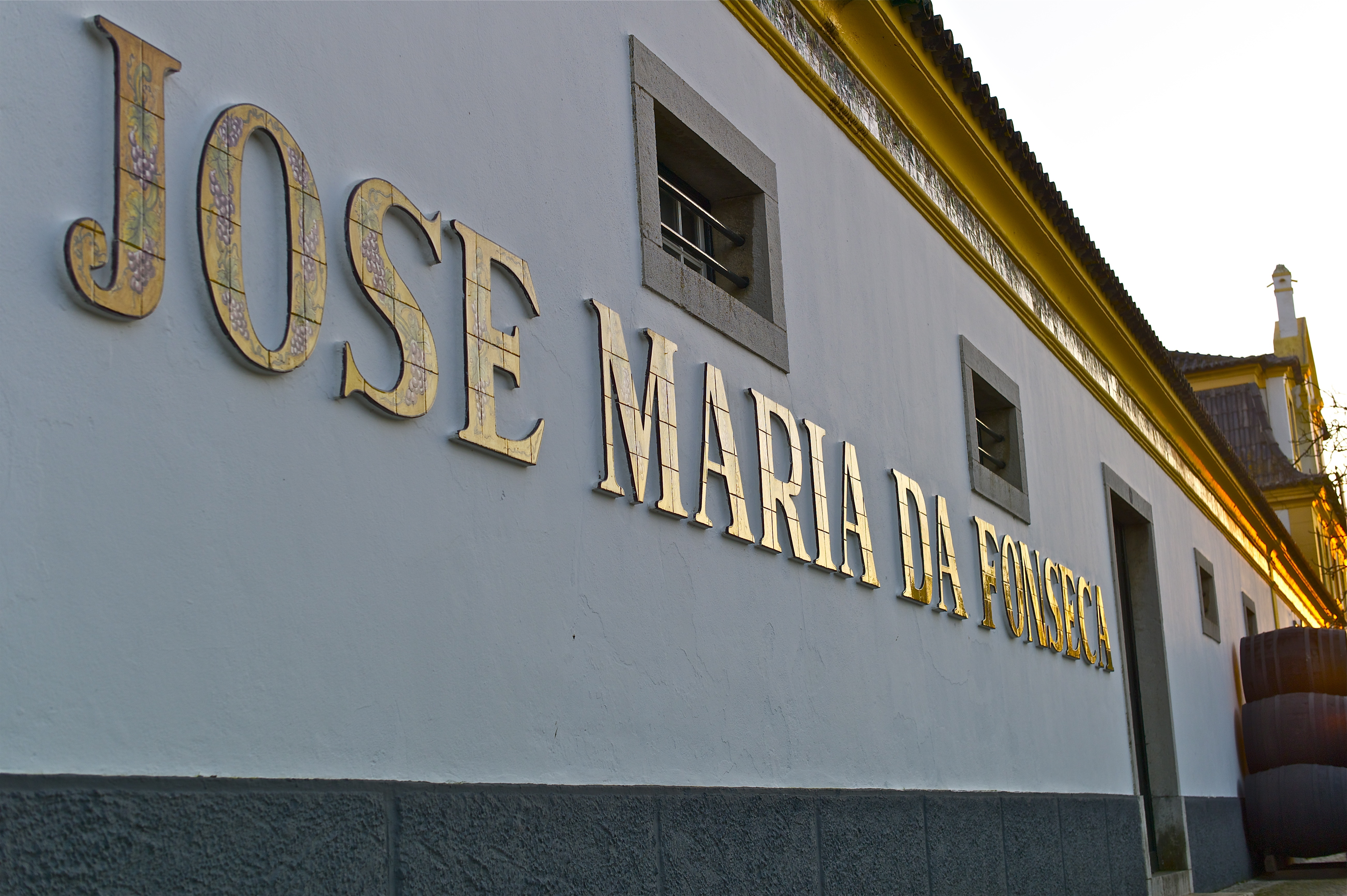
- Cellars in Azeitão
- Location: Azeitão, Portugal
- Other labels: Periquita; Lancers; Alambre
- Founded: 1834
- Key people: José Maria da Fonseca
- Distribution: International
- Website: jmf.pt

José Maria da Fonseca, also known as JM da Fonseca, is the oldest table wine company in Portugal, though some port wine houses pre-date it. The family-owned company was founded in 1834 and is based in the village of Azeitão on the Setúbal Peninsula. It is now in its 7th generation and most of its production is exported internationally. Among its best known wine brands are Periquita and Lancers.

== History ==
José Maria da Fonseca started the business in 1834, and the family has maintained it since then. In addition to its vineyards on the Setúbal peninsula, the company operates a number of vineyards in the Alentejo and Douro Valley regions.

The company's winery based in the Alentejo town of Reguengos de Monsaraz, uses the ancient Roman tradition of fermenting wine in clay pots along with modern technology.

== Brands ==
The company introduced its Periquita wine brand in 1850. The brand was initially produced from the Castelão variety of grape at one of the company's estates, Cova da Periquita. Unusual for the time, Periquita wine was bottled rather than sold in bulk. It went on to gain international recognition and by 2016 over 1.5 million bottles of the brand were being produced. A related brand of aged wine, Periquita Reserva, was introduced in the early 2010s.

The Lancers wine brand, a rosé, was introduced by JM da Fonseca in the United States in 1944. The company was looking to capitalize on wine drinking habits American soldiers had developed in Europe during World War II.

JM da Fonseca sells Moscatel de Setúbal wine under the Alambre brand.
