= Queijo de Azeitão =

Portuguese cheese

Azeitão cheese
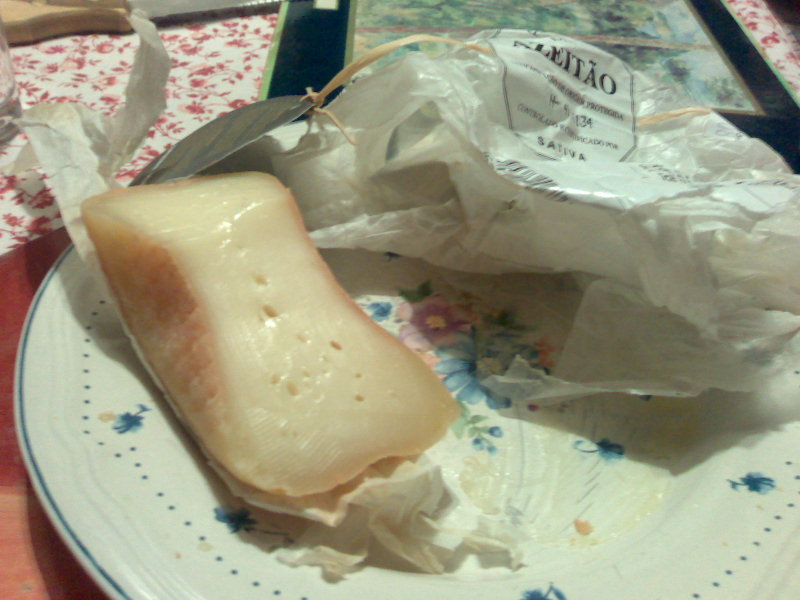
- Other names: Queijo de Azeitão
- Country of origin: Portugal
- Town: Azeitão, Setúbal
- Source of milk: Sheep
- Certification: PDO

Queijo de Azeitão is a Portuguese cheese originating from the town of Azeitão, in the municipality of Setúbal. It is produced in Setúbal, Palmela and Sesimbra.

It has been granted PDO status in the European Union.

In 2014, Azeitão cheese was named one of the 50 best gastronomic products in the world by the Great Taste Awards.

== See also ==
- List of cheeses § Portugal
- List of Portuguese cheeses with protected status
