= Frosé (drink) =

Cocktail

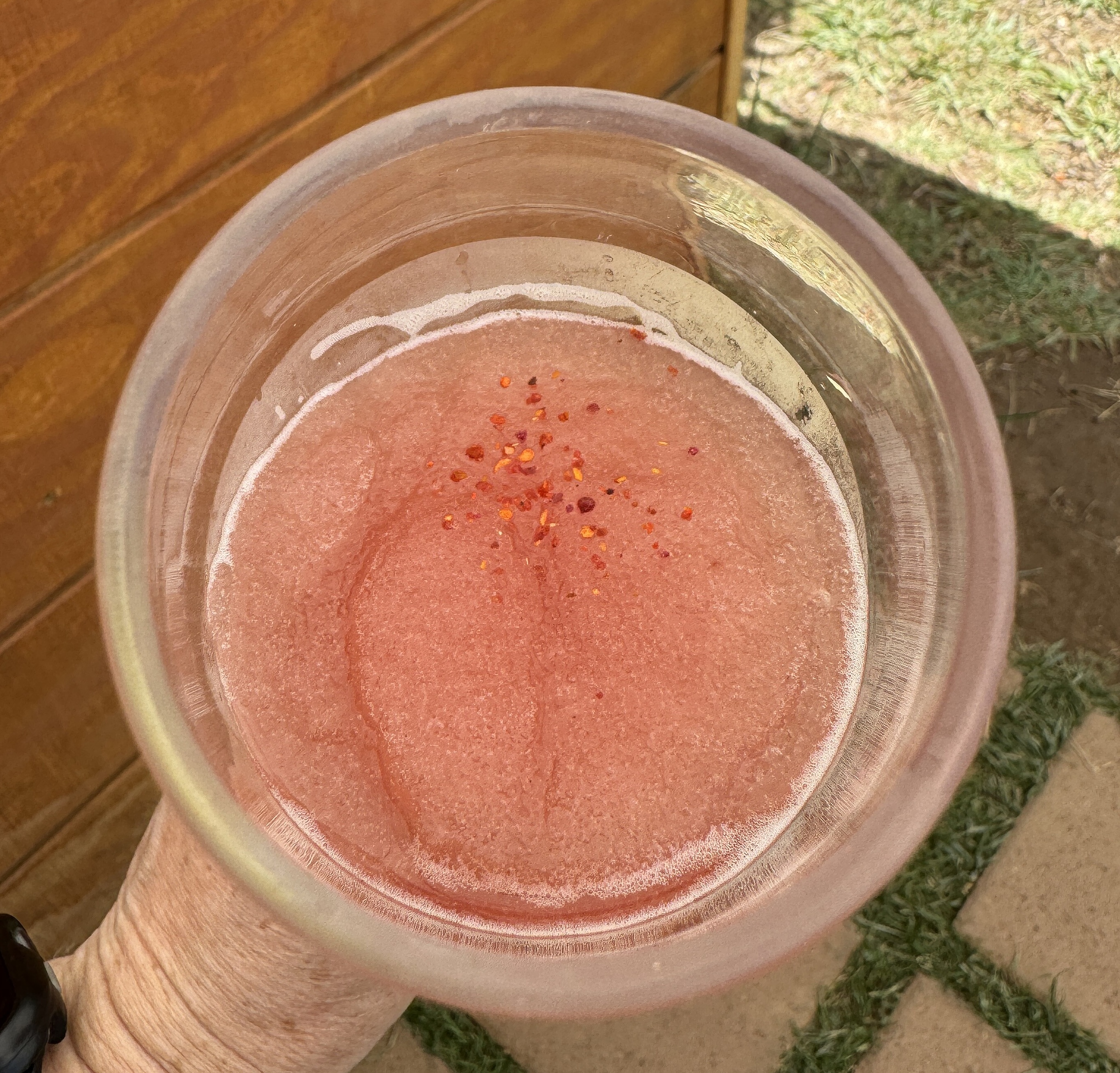
A frosé topped with Tajin.

Frosé is a mixed drink made from rosé wine frozen to a slush, with strawberries, vodka, and lemon juice.

== History ==
The Bar Primi in New York City is credited with inventing the drink, its name being contracted from "frozen rosé". It has since become popular as a summer drink across the US.

== Preparation ==
The rose wine is generally frozen and then ground in a blender, or made into a slush in a machine. Sugar is then added as a syrup or dissolved in water, strawberry without seeds or pulp, and lemon juice, blended together.

== Variations ==
- Watermelon frosé
- Mango frosé
