= Azeitão (São Lourenço e São Simão) =

- Civil parish
- Location in Portugal
- Coordinates: 38.519°N 9.016°W
- Country: Portugal
- Region: Lisbon
- Metropolitan area: Lisbon
- District: Setúbal
- Municipality: Setúbal

Area
  - Total: 69.32 km^{2} (26.76 sq mi)

Population (2011)
  - Total: 18,877
  - Density: 272.3/km^{2} (705.3/sq mi)
- Time zone: UTC+00:00 (WET)
  - Summer (DST): UTC+01:00 (WEST)

Azeitão (São Lourenço e São Simão) is a civil parish in the municipality of Setúbal, Portugal. It was formed in 2013 by the merger of the former parishes São Lourenço and São Simão. The population in 2011 was 18,877, in an area of 69.32 km^{2}. It is composed of a cluster of small "aldeias" or small villages, some of those are: Vila Fresca de Azeitão, Vila Nogueira de Azeitão, Brejos de Azeitão, Aldeia de Irmãos, Aldeia Velha, Vendas de Azeitão. Two of the closest cities are Setúbal and Palmela. This region is very famous for the cheese and wine.

== Heritage ==
- Church of São Lourenço: From the primitive Gothic temple nothing remains as proof, and what we see today is a church with 18th century tiles, carving and some paintings.
- Fountain of the Stunned: It gained its name due to the admiration that its contemplation caused. It is said that whoever drinks from these waters is permanently attached to the locality.
- José Maria da Fonseca Cellars and its Wine Museum: Housed in a 19th-century building, they showcase the old machinery to demonstrate how things evolved over a period of 150 years.
- Azeitão Tile Factory: It maintains the tradition of producing completely manual tiles, using the stoneware technique.
- Palace of the Dukes of Aveiro: Built in the 17th century, it is a symbol of the aristocratic past of the land. However, it is not visible. In front of it stands the pillory.
- Quinta das Torres: Sixteenth-century noble house that is now an inn with restaurant and tea house. It has a lake and a small fresh house in the center.
- Quinta da Bacalhoa: Famous not only for its wine, but also for hosting an important tile heritage of the 15th and 16th centuries.

In Azeitão there are several farms, some of them dedicated to wine production, cheese, and the famous Azeitão pies. Others are owned by famous people, such as Herman José, Manuel Vilarinho, or the former president of Sporting Clube de Portugal, Filipe Soares Franco.

Azeitão is the birthplace of the poet and pedagogue Sebastião da Gama, known for his poems about the Nature Park of Arrábida, who died prematurely at age 27, victim of tuberculosis. The parish pays several respects to the poet, especially in the house where he was born and in the Museum-Library Sebastião da Gama.

In 2014, Azeitão cheese was considered one of the 50 best gastronomic products in the world, distinguished by the Great Taste Awards, organized by the Guild of Fine Food (Ireland), known as the Oscars of Gastronomy.

In June 2015, the creation of the Ovelheiro Museum, located in Palmela, that pays homage to the shepherds and cheese of Azeitão was announced.

== Gallery ==
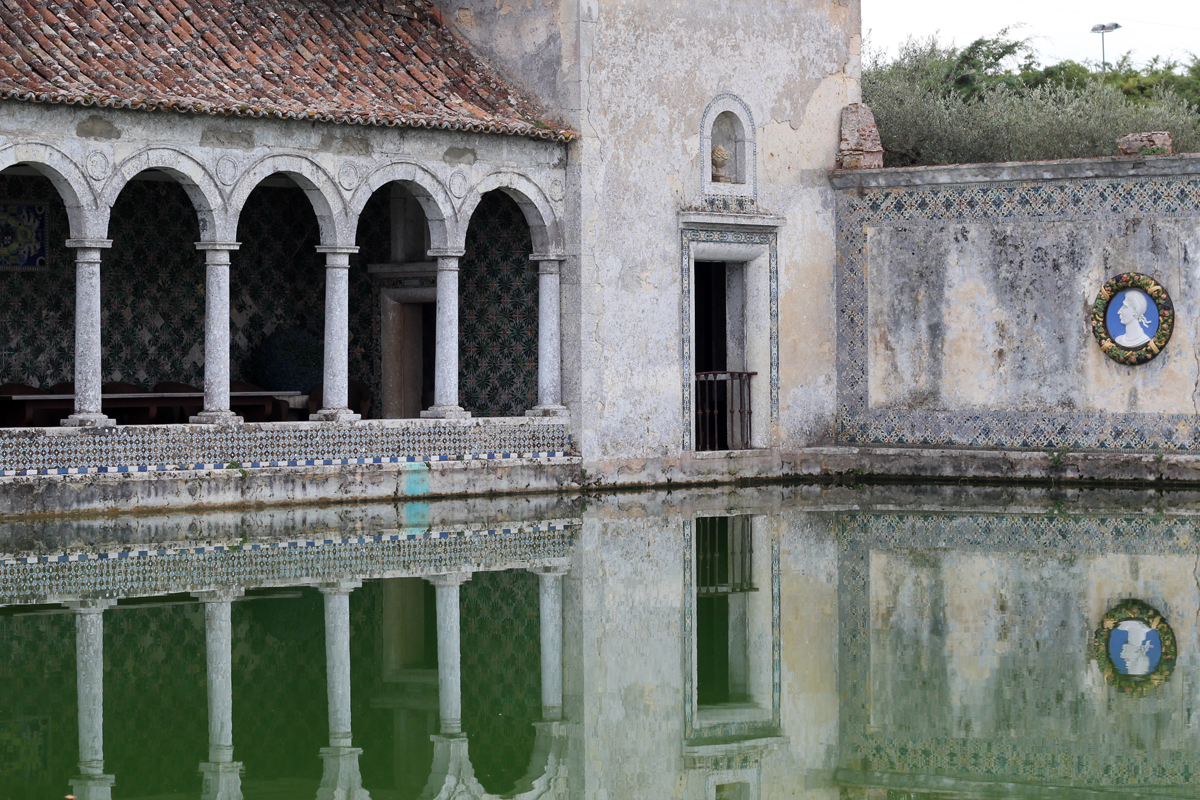
Quinta da Bacalhoa

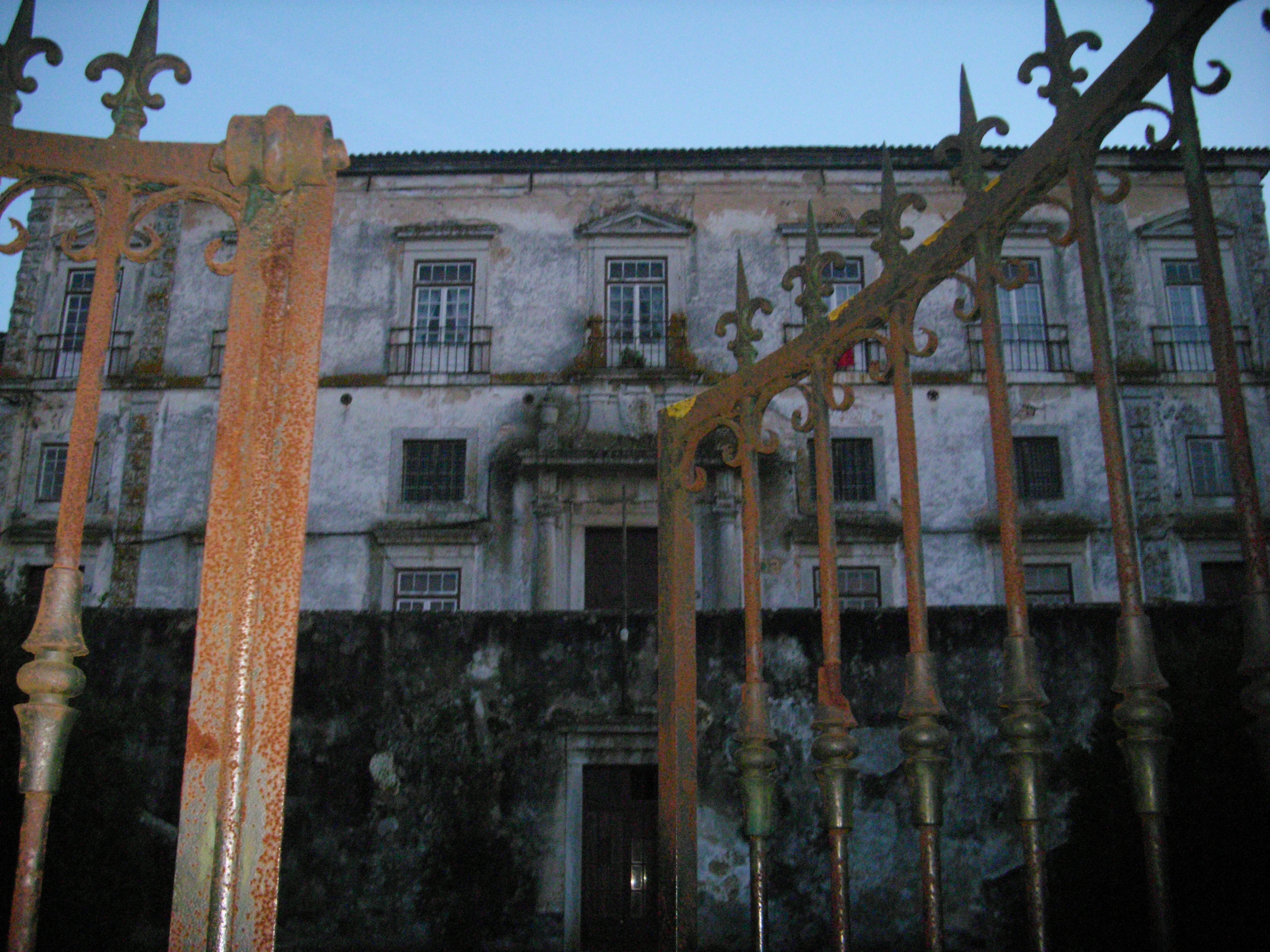
Vila Nogueira (Dukes of Aveiro palace)

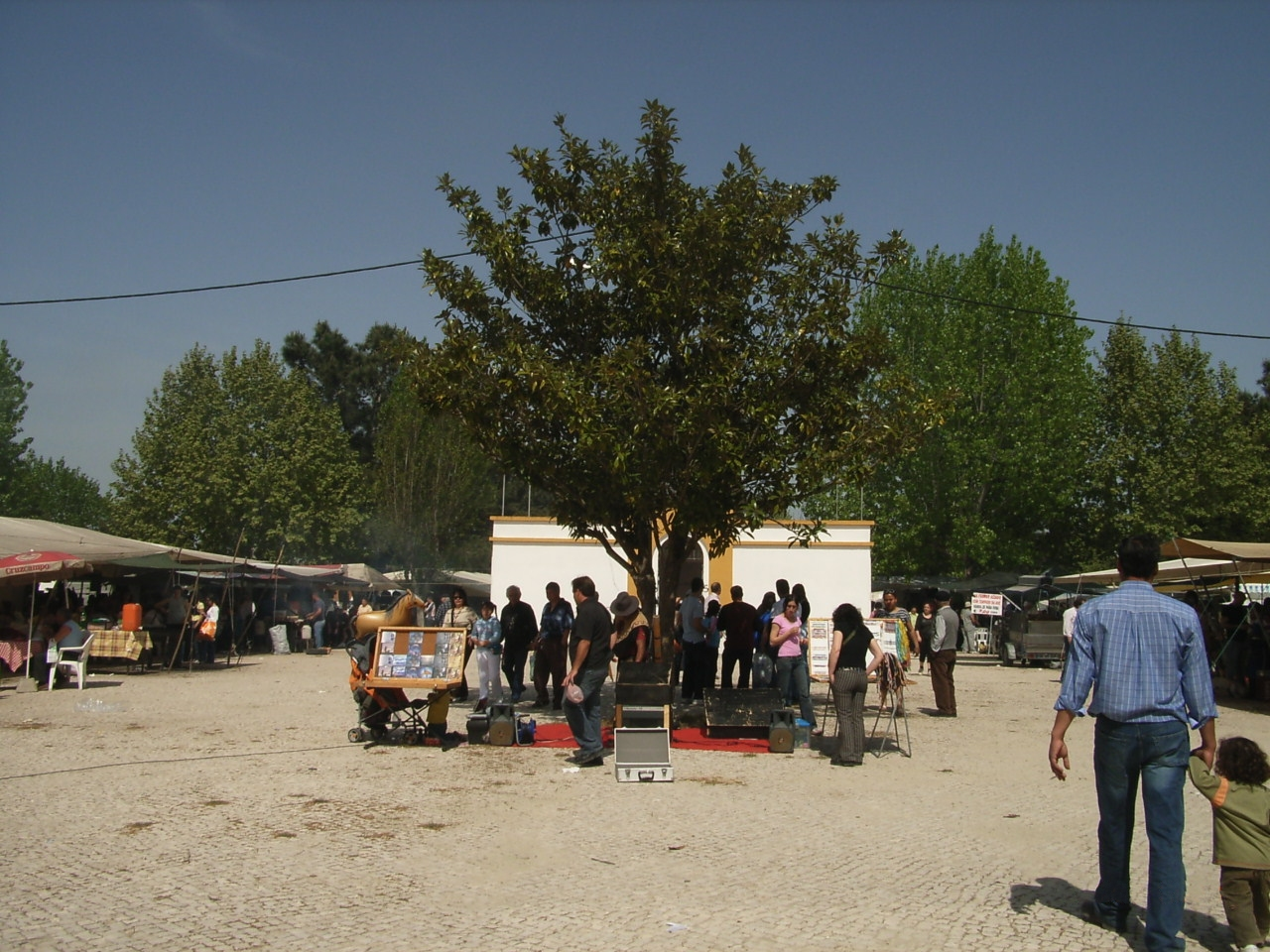
Marketplace

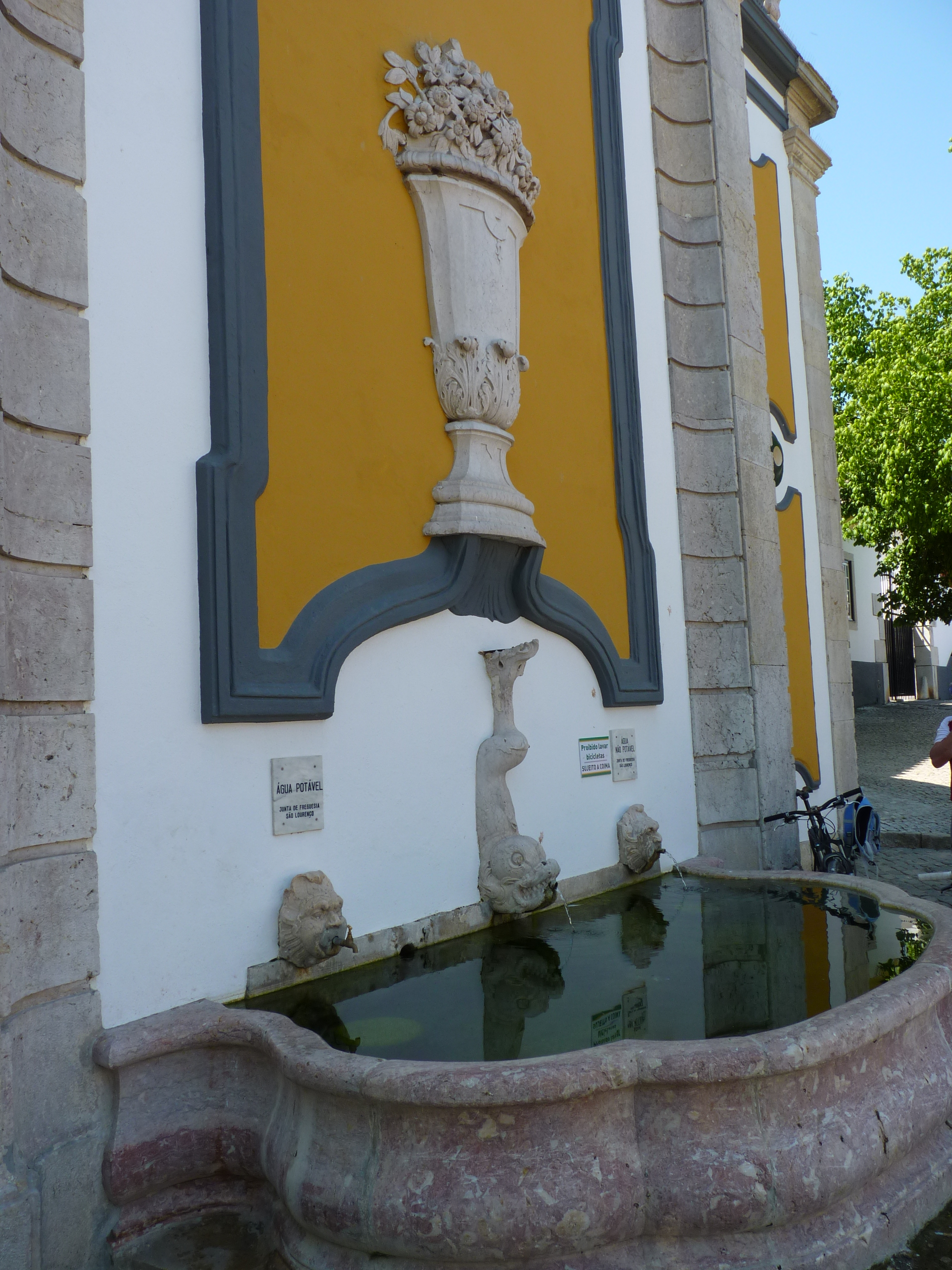
Fountain

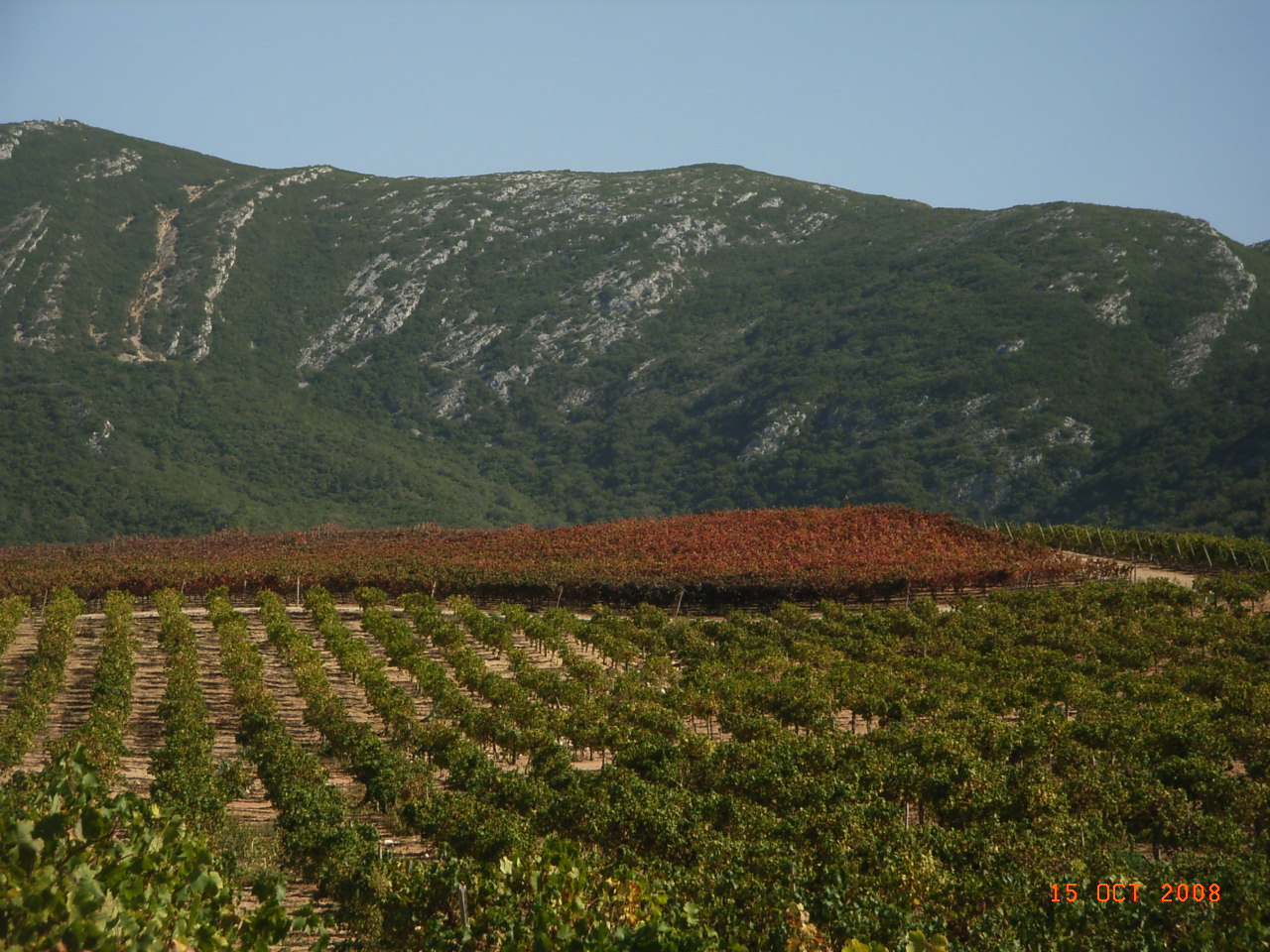
Vineyards around

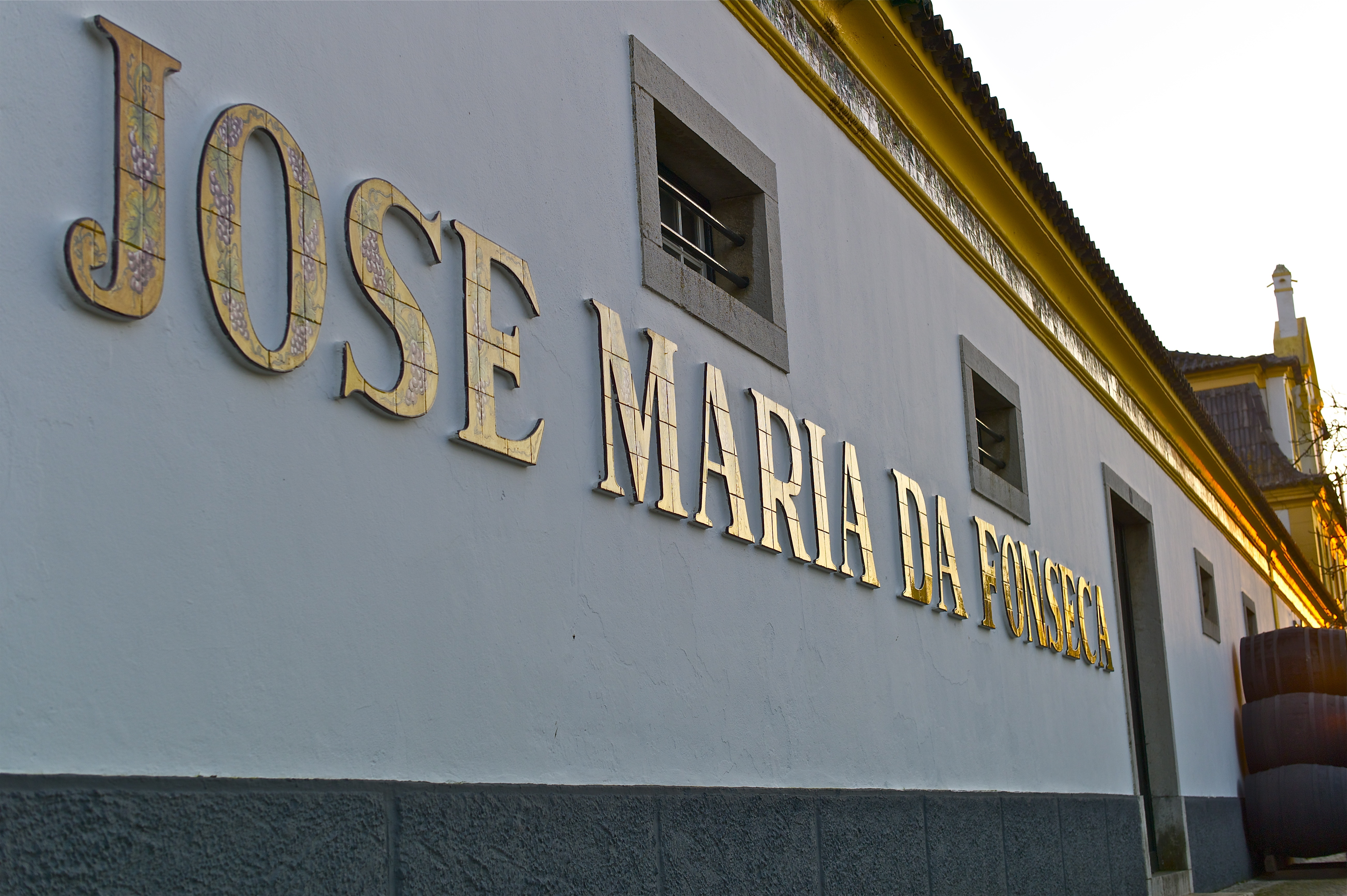
José Maria da Fonseca wine cellars

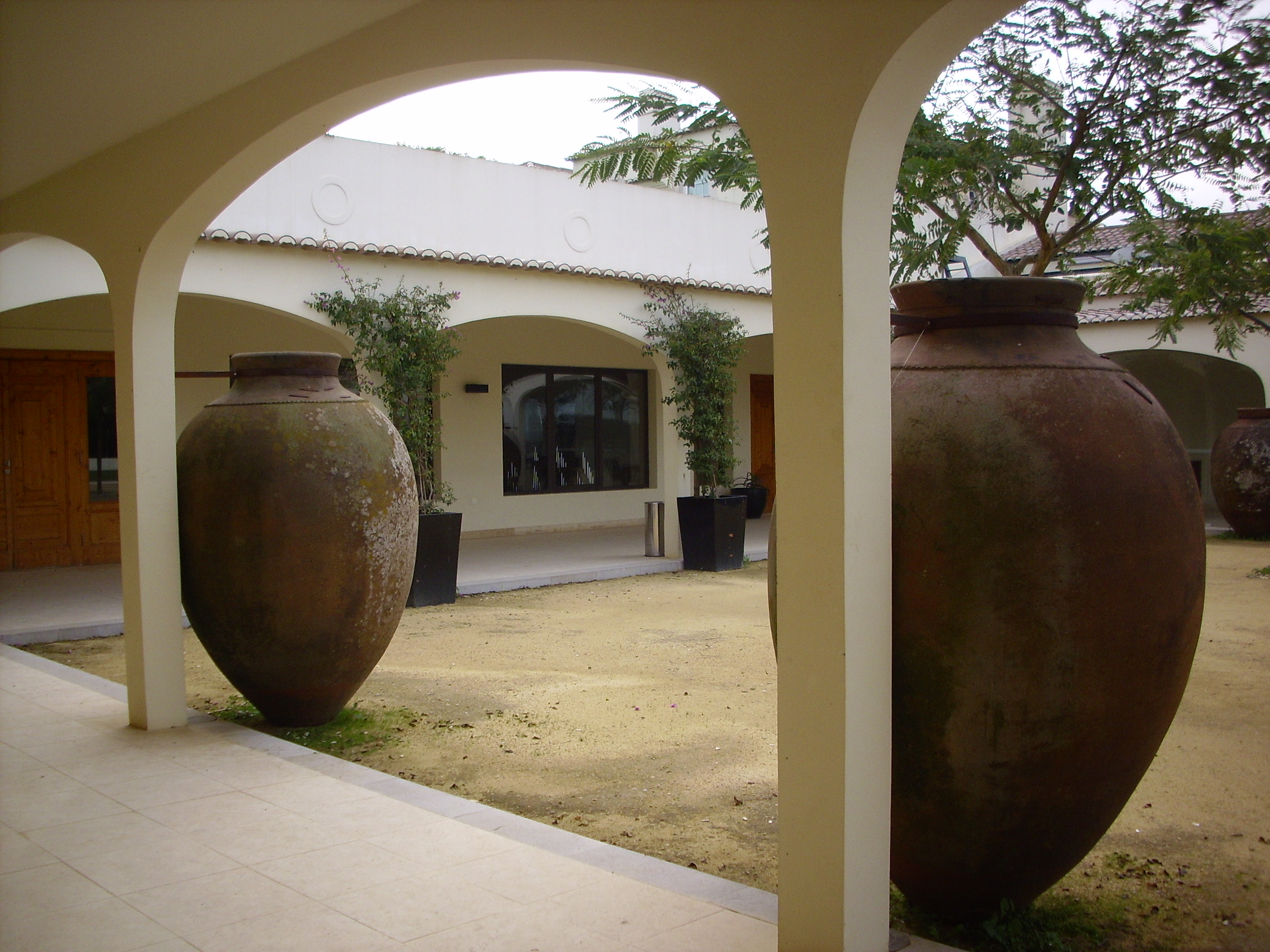
Quinta de Catralvos wine cellars

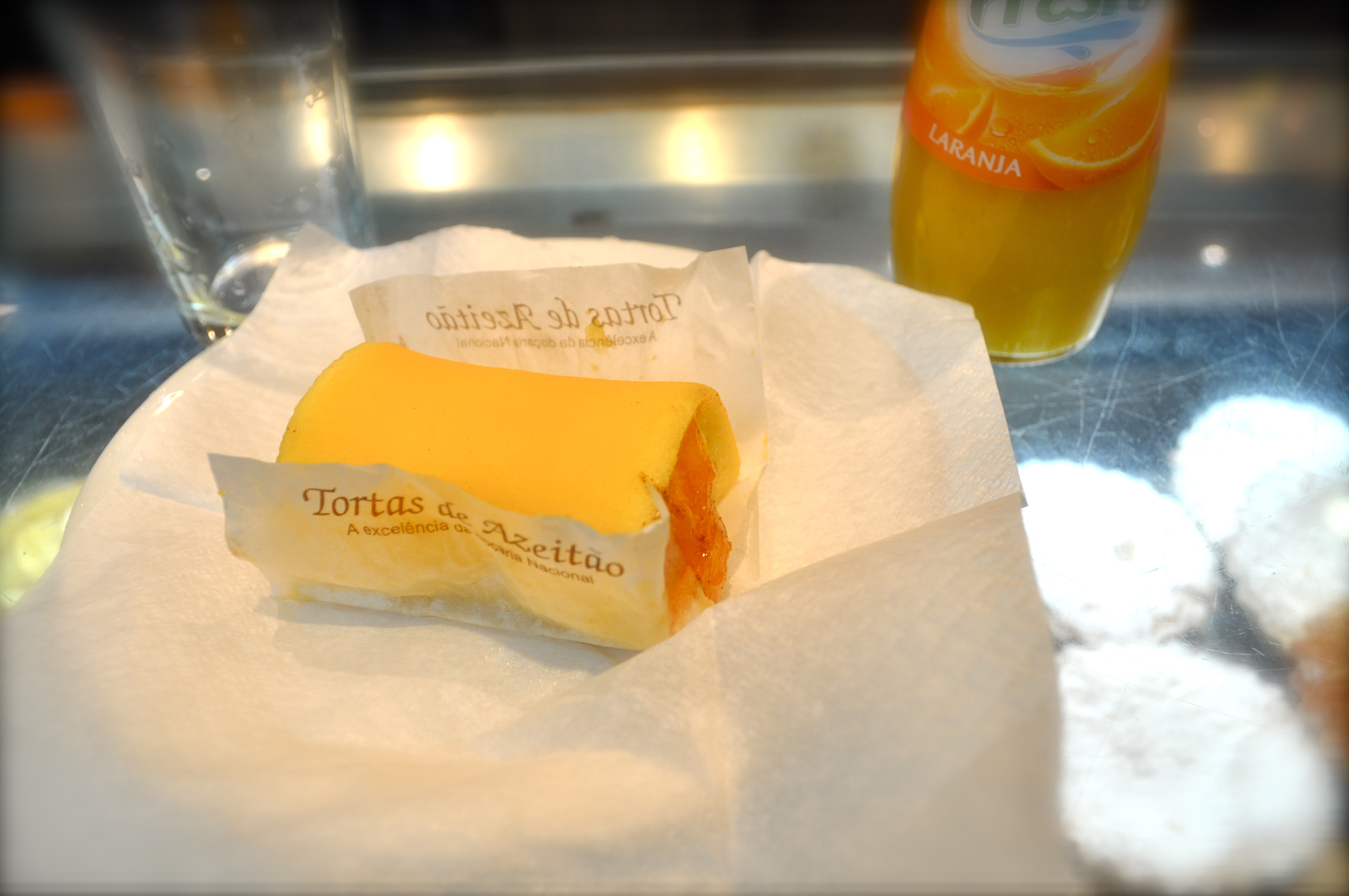
Torta de Azeitão

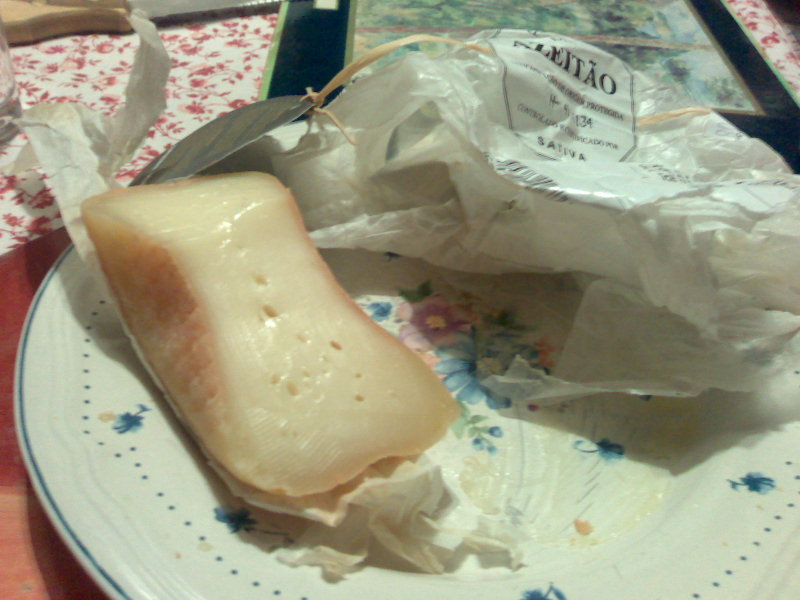
Queijo de Azeitão

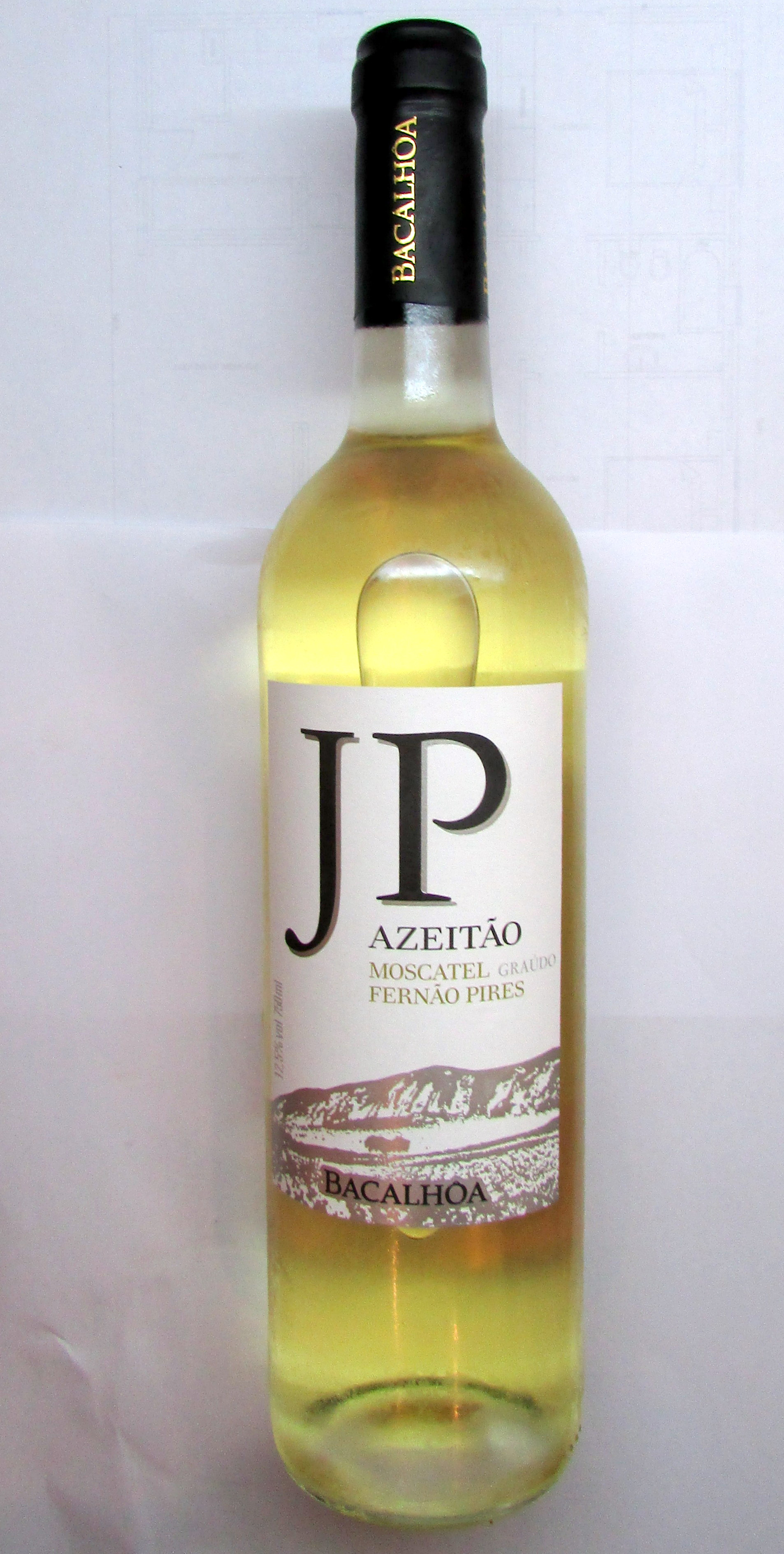
JP Azeitão Branco white wine

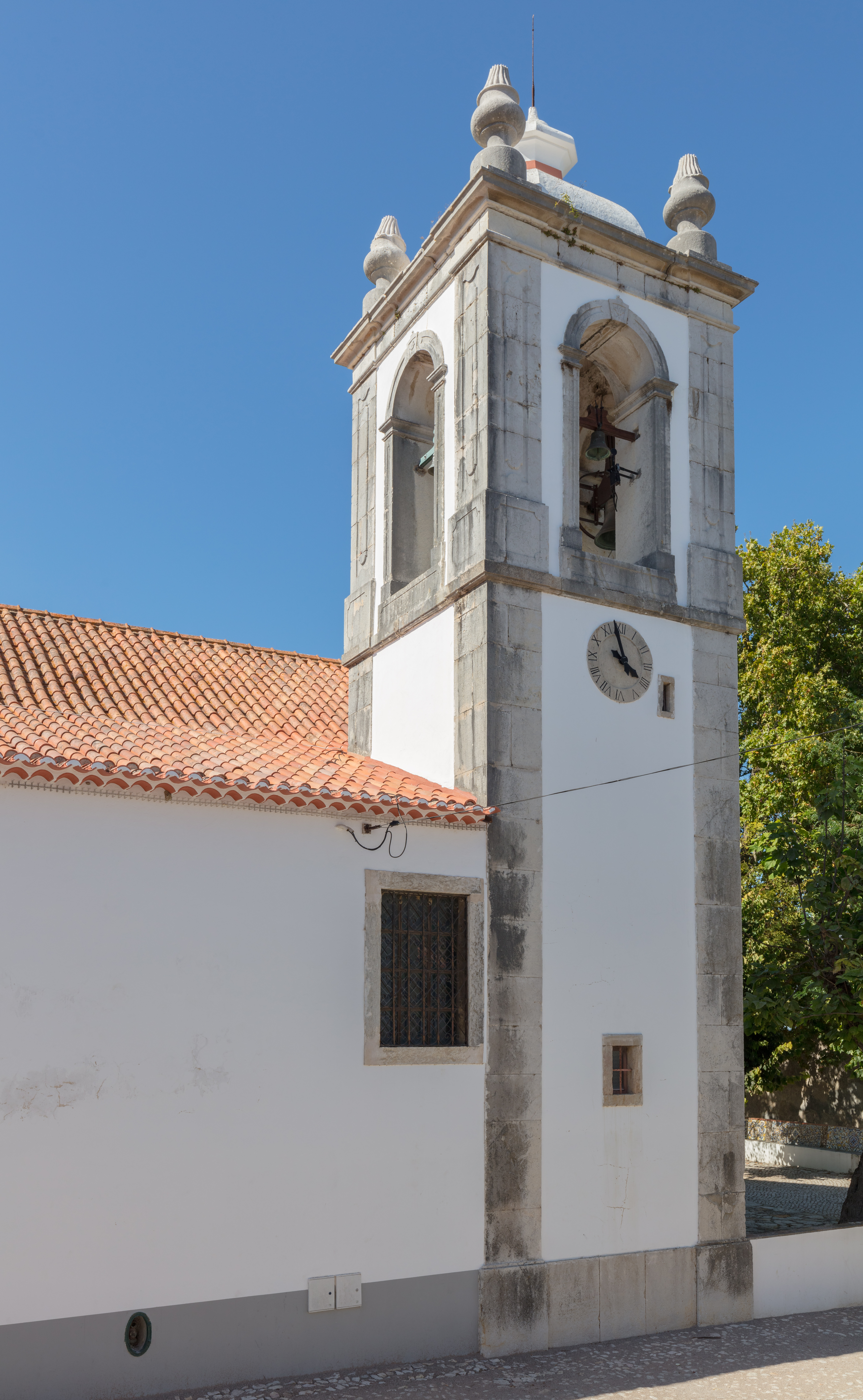
Church of São Simão
