= Lancers (wine) =

Portuguese brand of wine

- Manufacturer: José Maria da Fonseca
- Origin: Portugal
- Introduced: 1944
- Flavour: Medium-sweet
- Website: jmf.pt

Lancers is a brand of wine. A medium-sweet, lightly sparkling wine produced by the José Maria da Fonseca winery in Portugal. The brand was created in 1944, when Vintage Wines of New York predicted that wine consumption in the United States would increase after World War II.

It gained popularity in the mid-seventies as a slightly effervescent, easy to drink rosé, along with Mateus, as a wine that would be appropriate with any meal, versus the 'red with meat, white with chicken and fish' conventional rule. Much of its popularity was due to the unique angular crock bottle rather than glass. Other wines of the time were also popular for the container as much as the wine inside, like chianti in wicker flasks.

== See also ==
- Mateus (wine)
