= List of communes of the Loire valley =

Coordinates: 47°12′59″N 0°03′44″E

The Loire Valley is listed UNESCO World Heritage site since 30 November 2000 under the reference 933bis. The justification for the inscription of the territory is based on several criteria: its architectural heritage which includes the Châteaux of the Loire (criterion I), its exceptional cultural landscape (criterion II) and its cultural monuments, witnesses of the Renaissance and the century Enlightenment (criterion IV).

The list includes at this date 160 communes distributed in 2 regions (Pays de la Loire and Center-Val de Loire) and 4 departments (Maine-et-Loire, Loiret, Loir-et-Cher, Indre-et-Loire) on a distance of 280 km long stretching from Sully-sur-Loire to Chalonnes.

Commune	Postal code	Date of inscription	Image
Amboise	37400	2000	
Avaray	41500	2000	
Avoine	37420	2000	
Azay-le-Rideau	37190	2000	
Ballan-Miré	37510	2000	
Baule	45130	2000	
Beaugency	45190	2000	
Beaumont-en-Véron	37420	2000	
Béhuard	49170	2000	
Berthenay	37510	2000	
Blaison-Gohier	49320	2000	
Blois	41000	2000	
Bou	45430	2000	
Bouchemaine	49080	2000	
Brain-sur-l'Authion	49800	2000	
Bréhémont	37130	2000	
Candes-Saint-Martin	37500	2000	
Candé-sur-Beuvron	41120	2000	
Cangey	37530	2000	
Chailles	41120	2000	
Chaingy	45380	2000	
Chalonnes-sur-Loire	49170	2000	
Chambord	41250	1981	
Chargé	37530	2000	
Châteauneuf-sur-Loire	45110	2000	
Chaumont-sur-Loire	41150	2000	
Chécy	45430	2000	
Cheillé	37190	2000	
Chênehutte-Trèves-Cunault	49350	2000	
Chenonceaux	37150	2017	
Chinon	37500	2000	
Chouzé-sur-Loire	37140	2000	
Chouzy-sur-Cisse	41150	2000	
Cinais	37500	2000	
Cinq-Mars-la-Pile	37130	2000	
Cléry-Saint-André	45370	2000	
Combleux	45800	2000	
Courbouzon	41500	2000	
Cour-sur-Loire	41500	2000	
Darvoy	45150	2000	
Denée	49190	2000	
Dry	45370	2000	
Fondettes	37230	2000	
Fontevraud-l'Abbaye	49590	2000	
Gennes	49350	2000	
Germigny-des-Prés	45110	2000	
Huismes	37420	2000	
Ingrandes-de-Touraine	37140	2000	
Jargeau	45150	2000	
Joué-lès-Tours	37300	2000	
Juigné-sur-Loire	49610	2000	
La Bohalle	49800	2000	
La Chapelle-sur-Loire	37140	2000	
La Chapelle-aux-Naux	37130	2000	
La Chapelle-Saint-Mesmin	45380	2000	
La Chaussée-Saint-Victor	41260	2000	
La Daguenière	49800	2000	
La Ménitré	49250	2000	
La Possonnière	49170	2000	
La Riche	37520	2000	
La Roche-Clermault	37500	2000	
La Ville-aux-Dames	37500	2000	
Lailly-en-Val	45740	2000	
Langeais	37130	2000	
Larçay	37270	2000	
Le Thoureil	49350	2000	
Lerné	37500	2000	
Les Ponts-de-Cé	49130	2000	
Les Rosiers	49350	2000	
Lestiou	41500	2000	
Lignières-de-Touraine	37130	2000	
Limeray	37530	2000	
Lussault-sur-Loire	37400	2000	
Luynes	37230	2000	
Mardié	45430	2000	
Mareau-aux-Prés	45370	2000	
Maslives	41250	2000	
Menars	41500	2000	
Mer	41500	2000	
Meung-sur-Loire	45130	2000	
Monteaux	41150	2000	
Montlivault	41350	2000	
Montlouis-sur-Loire	37270	2000	
Montsoreau	49730	2000	
Mosnes	37530	2000	
Muides-sur-Loire	41500	2000	
Mûrs-Erigné	49610	2000	
Nazelles-Negron	37530	2000	
Neuvy-en-Sullias	45510	2000	
Noizay	37210	2000	
Olivet	45160	2000	
Onzain	41150	2000	
Orléans	45100	2000	
Ouvrouer-les-Champs	45150	2000	
Parnay	49730	2000	
Pocé-sur-Cisse	37530	2000	
Rigny-Ussé	37420	2000	
Rilly-sur-Loire	41150	2000	
Rivarennes	37190	2000	
Rivière	37500	2000	
Rochecorbon	37210	2000	
Rochefort-sur-Loire	49190	2000	
Saint-Clément-des-Levées	49350	2000	
Saint-Jean-de-la-Croix	49130	2000	
Saint-Jean-des-Mauvrets	49320	2000	
Saint-Martin-de-la-Place	49160	2000	
Saint-Mathurin-sur-Loire	49250	2000	
Saint-Rémy-la-Varenne	49250	2000	
Saint-Saturnin-sur-Loire	49320	2000	
Saint-Sulpice	49320	2000	
Saint-Avertin	37550	2000	
Saint-Ay	45130	2000	
Saint-Benoit-sur-Loire	45730	2000	
Saint-Claude-de-Diray	41350	2000	
Saint-Cyr-sur-Loire	37540	2000	
Saint-Denis-de-l'Hôtel	45550	2000	
Saint-Denis-en-Val	45560	2000	
Saint-Denis-sur-Loire	41000	2000	
Saint-Dyé-sur-Loire	41500	2000	
Sainte-Gemmes-sur-Loire	49130	2000	
Saint-Étienne-de-Chigny	37230	2000	
Saint-Genouph	37510	2000	
Saint-Germain-sur-Vienne	37500	2000	
Saint-Gervais-la-Forêt	41350	2000	
Saint-Hilaire-Saint-Mesmin	45160	2000	
Saint-Jean-de-Braye	45800	2000	
Saint-Jean-de-la-Ruelle	45140	2000	
Saint-Jean-le-Blanc	45650	2000	
Saint-Laurent-Nouan	41220	2000	
Saint-Martin-d'Abbat	45110	2000	
Saint-Michel-sur-Loire	37130	2000	
Saint-Patrice	37130	2000	
Saint-Père-sur-Loire	45600	2000	
Saint-Pierre-des-Corps	37700	2000	
Saint-Pryvé-Saint-Mesmin	45750	2000	
Sandillon	445640	2000	
Saumur	49400	2000	
Savennières	49170	2000	
Savigny-en-Véron	37420	2000	
Savonnières	37510	2000	
Seuilly	37500	2000	
Sigloy	45110	2000	
Souzay-Champigny	49400	2000	
Suèvres	41500	2000	
Sully-sur-Loire	45600	2000	
Tavers	45190	2000	
Thizay	37500	2000	
Tours	37000	2000	
Trélazé	49800	2000	
Turquant	49730	2000	
Vallères	37190	2000	
Varennes-sur-Loire	49730	2000	
Véretz	37270	2000	
Vernou-sur-Brenne	37210	2000	
Veuves	41150	2000	
Villandry	37510	2000	
Villebernier	49400	2000	
Vineuil	41350	2000	
Vouvray	37210	2000	
