= Arrondissement of Tours =

Coordinates: 47°24′N 0°41′E

Tours
- Arrondissement
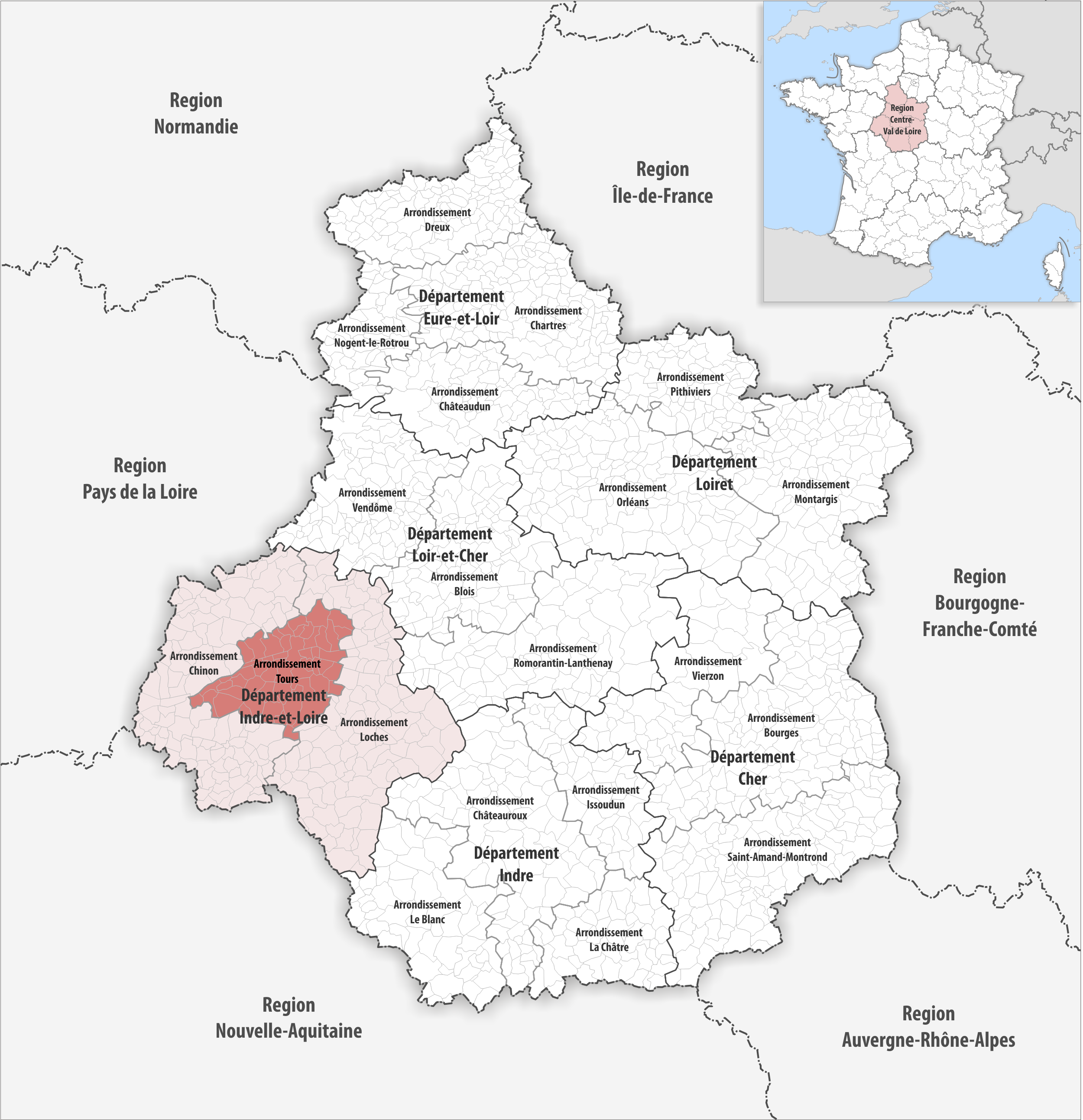
- Location within the region Centre-Val de Loire
- Country: France
- Region: Centre-Val de Loire
- Department: Indre-et-Loire
- No. of communes: {{{nbcomm}}}
- Area: 1,087.6 km^{2} (419.9 sq mi)
- Population (2023): 397,913
  - Density: 365.86/km^{2} (947.58/sq mi)
- INSEE code: 372

The arrondissement of Tours is an arrondissement of France in the Indre-et-Loire department in the Centre-Val de Loire region. It has 54 communes. Its population is 392,030 (2021), and its area is 1,087.6 km^{2} (419.9 sq mi).

== Composition ==
The communes of the arrondissement of Tours, and their INSEE codes, are:

1. Artannes-sur-Indre (37006)
2. Azay-le-Rideau (37014)
3. Azay-sur-Cher (37015)
4. Ballan-Miré (37018)
5. Berthenay (37025)
6. Bréhémont (37038)
7. Chambray-lès-Tours (37050)
8. Chançay (37052)
9. Chanceaux-sur-Choisille (37054)
10. La Chapelle-aux-Naux (37056)
11. Cheillé (37067)
12. Druye (37099)
13. Esvres (37104)
14. Fondettes (37109)
15. Joué-lès-Tours (37122)
16. Larçay (37124)
17. Lignières-de-Touraine (37128)
18. Luynes (37139)
19. La Membrolle-sur-Choisille (37151)
20. Mettray (37152)
21. Monnaie (37153)
22. Montbazon (37154)
23. Montlouis-sur-Loire (37156)
24. Monts (37159)
25. Notre-Dame-d'Oé (37172)
26. Parçay-Meslay (37179)
27. Pont-de-Ruan (37186)
28. Reugny (37194)
29. La Riche (37195)
30. Rigny-Ussé (37197)
31. Rivarennes (37200)
32. Rochecorbon (37203)
33. Saché (37205)
34. Saint-Avertin (37208)
35. Saint-Branchs (37211)
36. Saint-Cyr-sur-Loire (37214)
37. Sainte-Catherine-de-Fierbois (37212)
38. Saint-Étienne-de-Chigny (37217)
39. Saint-Genouph (37219)
40. Saint-Pierre-des-Corps (37233)
41. Savonnières (37243)
42. Sorigny (37250)
43. Thilouze (37257)
44. Tours (37261)
45. Truyes (37263)
46. Vallères (37264)
47. Veigné (37266)
48. Véretz (37267)
49. Vernou-sur-Brenne (37270)
50. Villaines-les-Rochers (37271)
51. Villandry (37272)
52. La Ville-aux-Dames (37273)
53. Villeperdue (37278)
54. Vouvray (37281)

== History ==
The arrondissement of Tours was created in 1800. At the January 2017 reorganisation of the arrondissements of Indre-et-Loire, it gained 12 communes from the arrondissement of Chinon, and it lost 34 communes to the arrondissement of Chinon and 46 communes to the arrondissement of Loches.

As a result of the reorganisation of the cantons of France which came into effect in 2015, the borders of the cantons are no longer related to the borders of the arrondissements. The cantons of the arrondissement of Tours were, as of January 2015:

1. Amboise
2. Ballan-Miré
3. Bléré
4. Chambray-lès-Tours
5. Château-la-Vallière
6. Château-Renault
7. Joué-lès-Tours-Nord
8. Joué-lès-Tours-Sud
9. Luynes
10. Montbazon
11. Montlouis-sur-Loire
12. Neuillé-Pont-Pierre
13. Neuvy-le-Roi
14. Saint-Avertin
15. Saint-Cyr-sur-Loire
16. Saint-Pierre-des-Corps
17. Tours-Centre
18. Tours-Est
19. Tours-Nord-Est
20. Tours-Nord-Ouest
21. Tours-Ouest
22. Tours-Sud
23. Tours-Val-du-Cher
24. Vouvray
