= Marçay =

Marçay may refer to the following places in France:

- Marçay, Indre-et-Loire, a commune in the Indre-et-Loire department
- Marçay, Vienne, a commune in the Vienne department
