= Thilouze =

- Commune
- Coat of arms
- Location of Thilouze
- Location within France Location within Centre-Val de Loire
- Coordinates: 47°13′25″N 0°34′52″E
- Country: France
- Region: Centre-Val de Loire
- Department: Indre-et-Loire
- Arrondissement: Tours
- Canton: Chinon

Government
  - Mayor (2020–2026): Éric Loizon
- Area^{1}: 33.75 km^{2} (13.03 sq mi)
- Highest elevation: 114 m (374 ft)
- Lowest elevation: 53 m (174 ft)
- Population (2023): 1,815
  - Density: 53.78/km^{2} (139.3/sq mi)
- Time zone: UTC+01:00 (CET)
  - Summer (DST): UTC+02:00 (CEST)
- INSEE/Postal code: 37257 /37260
- ^{1} French Land Register data, which excludes lakes, ponds, glaciers > 1 km^{2} (0.386 sq mi or 247 acres) and river estuaries.

Thilouze (French pronunciation: [tiluz]) is a commune in the Indre-et-Loire department in central France.

== Population ==
Historical population
Year	Pop.	±% p.a.
1968	691	—
1975	713	+0.45%
1982	817	+1.96%
1990	1,049	+3.17%
1999	1,133	+0.86%
2007	1,438	+3.02%
2012	1,628	+2.51%
2017	1,721	+1.12%
2023	1,815	+0.89%
Source: INSEE

== See also ==
- Communes of the Indre-et-Loire department
