= La Membrolle-sur-Choisille =

- Commune
- Coat of arms
- Location of La Membrolle-sur-Choisille
- Location within France Location within Centre-Val de Loire
- Coordinates: 47°26′20″N 0°38′25″E
- Country: France
- Region: Centre-Val de Loire
- Department: Indre-et-Loire
- Arrondissement: Tours
- Canton: Saint-Cyr-sur-Loire
- Intercommunality: Tours Métropole Val de Loire

Government
  - Mayor (2020–2026): Sébastien Marais
- Area^{1}: 6.87 km^{2} (2.65 sq mi)
- Highest elevation: 94 m (308 ft)
- Lowest elevation: 51 m (167 ft)
- Population (2023): 3,290
  - Density: 479/km^{2} (1,240/sq mi)
- Time zone: UTC+01:00 (CET)
  - Summer (DST): UTC+02:00 (CEST)
- INSEE/Postal code: 37151 /37390
- ^{1} French Land Register data, which excludes lakes, ponds, glaciers > 1 km^{2} (0.386 sq mi or 247 acres) and river estuaries.

La Membrolle-sur-Choisille (French pronunciation: [la mɑ̃bʁɔl syʁ ʃwazij]) is a commune in the Indre-et-Loire department in central France.

== Population ==
The commune was created in 1873 from part of Mettray.

Historical population

Year	Pop.	±% p.a.
1876	801	—
1881	794	−0.18%
1886	763	−0.79%
1891	706	−1.54%
1896	699	−0.20%
1901	686	−0.37%
1906	652	−1.01%
1911	675	+0.70%
1921	727	+0.74%
1926	776	+1.31%
1931	837	+1.52%
1936	929	+2.11%

Year	Pop.	±% p.a.
1946	1,061	+1.34%
1954	1,194	+1.49%
1962	1,261	+0.68%
1968	1,217	−0.59%
1975	1,885	+6.45%
1982	2,569	+4.52%
1990	2,644	+0.36%
1999	2,928	+1.14%
2007	3,042	+0.48%
2012	3,031	−0.07%
2017	3,324	+1.86%
2023	3,290	−0.17%

Source: EHESS and INSEE (1968-2023)

== See also ==
- Communes of the Indre-et-Loire department
