= Canton of Chinon =

Coordinates: 47.17°N 0.24°E

The canton of Chinon is an administrative division of the Indre-et-Loire department, central France. Its borders were modified at the French canton reorganisation which came into effect in March 2015. Its seat is in Chinon.

It consists of the following communes:

- Avoine
- Azay-le-Rideau
- Beaumont-en-Véron
- Bréhémont
- Candes-Saint-Martin
- La Chapelle-aux-Naux
- Cheillé
- Chinon
- Cinais
- Couziers
- Huismes
- Lerné
- Lignières-de-Touraine
- Marçay
- Rigny-Ussé
- Rivarennes
- Rivière
- La Roche-Clermault
- Saché
- Saint-Benoît-la-Forêt
- Saint-Germain-sur-Vienne
- Savigny-en-Véron
- Seuilly
- Thilouze
- Thizay
- Vallères
- Villaines-les-Rochers
