= Villaines-les-Rochers =

- Commune
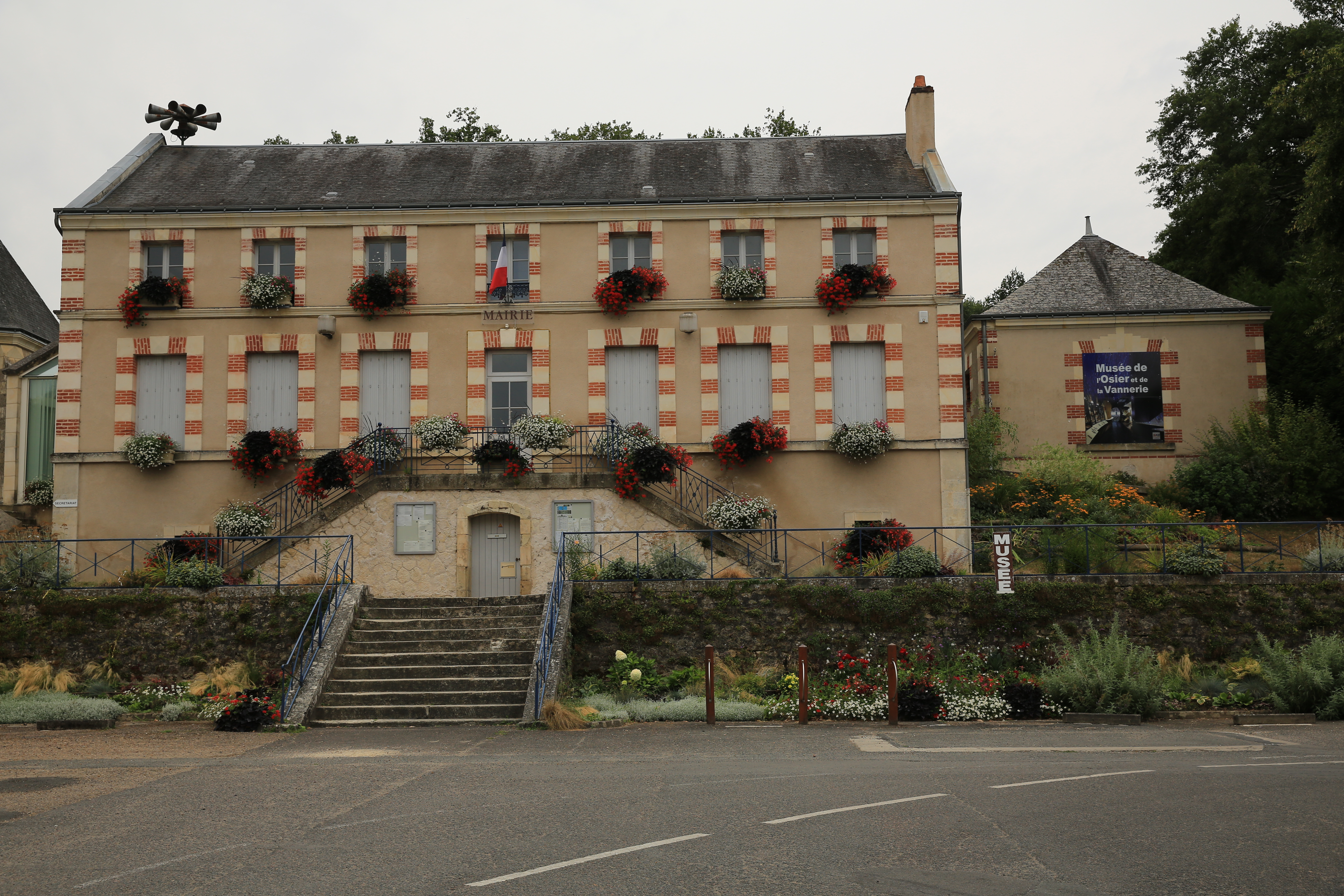
- Town hall
- Location of Villaines-les-Rochers
- Location within France Location within Centre-Val de Loire
- Coordinates: 47°13′19″N 0°29′52″E
- Country: France
- Region: Centre-Val de Loire
- Department: Indre-et-Loire
- Arrondissement: Tours
- Canton: Chinon

Government
  - Mayor (2020–2026): Marie-Annette Bergeot
- Area^{1}: 12.47 km^{2} (4.81 sq mi)
- Highest elevation: 116 m (381 ft)
- Lowest elevation: 52 m (171 ft)
- Population (2023): 1,051
  - Density: 84.28/km^{2} (218.3/sq mi)
- Time zone: UTC+01:00 (CET)
  - Summer (DST): UTC+02:00 (CEST)
- INSEE/Postal code: 37271 /37190
- ^{1} French Land Register data, which excludes lakes, ponds, glaciers > 1 km^{2} (0.386 sq mi or 247 acres) and river estuaries.

Villaines-les-Rochers (French pronunciation: [vilɛn le ʁɔʃe]) is a commune in the Indre-et-Loire department in central France.

== Population ==
Historical population
Year	Pop.	±% p.a.
1968	836	—
1975	808	−0.49%
1982	932	+2.06%
1990	930	−0.03%
1999	918	−0.14%
2007	922	+0.05%
2012	1,006	+1.76%
2017	1,067	+1.18%
2023	1,051	−0.25%
Source: INSEE

== See also ==
- Communes of the Indre-et-Loire department
