= Saché, Indre-et-Loire =

Saché
- Commune
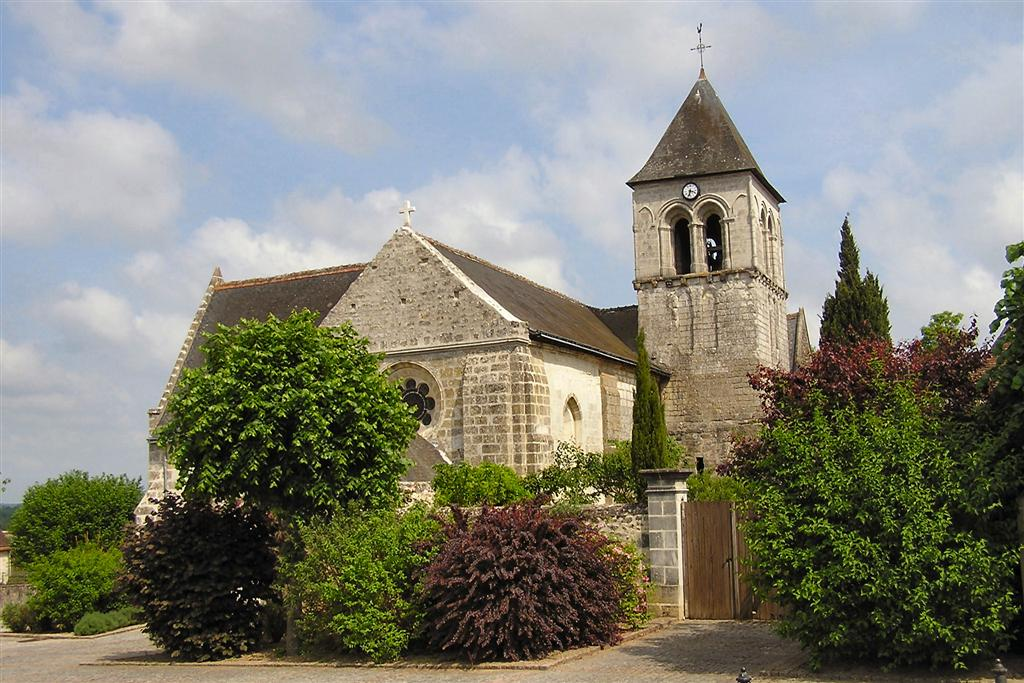
- The church in Saché

- Coat of arms
- Location of Saché
- Location within France Location within Centre-Val de Loire
- Coordinates: 47°14′52″N 0°32′39″E
- Country: France
- Region: Centre-Val de Loire
- Department: Indre-et-Loire
- Arrondissement: Tours
- Canton: Chinon

Government
  - Mayor (2020–2026): Stéphane Augu
- Area^{1}: 28.29 km^{2} (10.92 sq mi)
- Highest elevation: 113 m (371 ft)
- Lowest elevation: 41 m (135 ft)
- Population (2023): 1,403
  - Density: 49.59/km^{2} (128.4/sq mi)
- Time zone: UTC+01:00 (CET)
  - Summer (DST): UTC+02:00 (CEST)
- INSEE/Postal code: 37205 /37190
- ^{1} French Land Register data, which excludes lakes, ponds, glaciers > 1 km^{2} (0.386 sq mi or 247 acres) and river estuaries.

Saché (French pronunciation: [saʃe]) is a commune in the Indre-et-Loire department in central France.

== Population ==
Historical population
Year	Pop.	±% p.a.
1968	638	—
1975	601	−0.85%
1982	738	+2.98%
1990	868	+2.05%
1999	1,004	+1.63%
2007	1,207	+2.33%
2012	1,309	+1.64%
2017	1,392	+1.24%
2023	1,403	+0.13%
Source: INSEE

== See also ==
- Communes of the Indre-et-Loire department
