= Lignières-de-Touraine =

- Commune
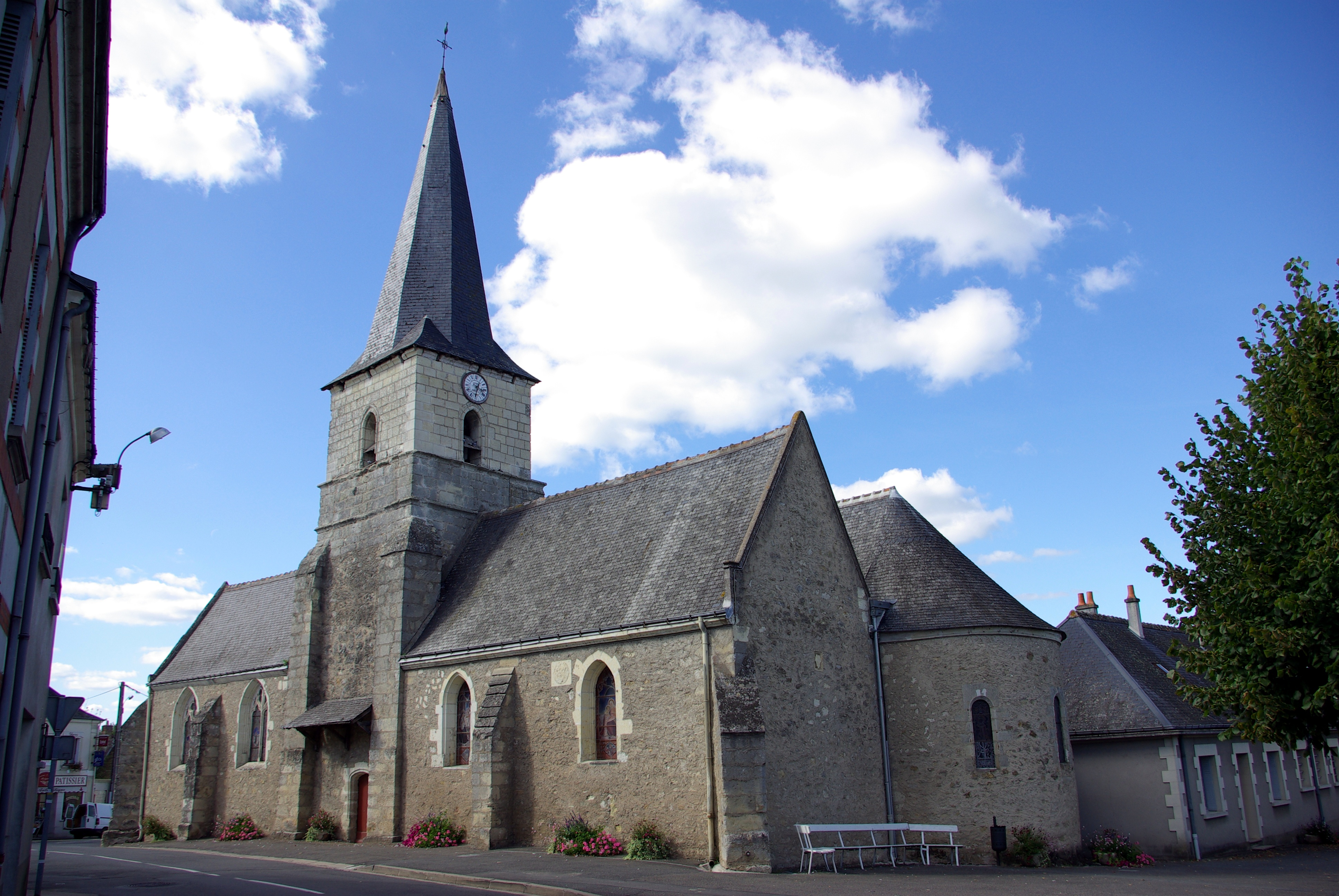
- The church of Saint-Martin, in Lignières-de-Touraine
- Location of Lignières-de-Touraine
- Location within France Location within Centre-Val de Loire
- Coordinates: 47°17′53″N 0°25′04″E
- Country: France
- Region: Centre-Val de Loire
- Department: Indre-et-Loire
- Arrondissement: Tours
- Canton: Chinon
- Intercommunality: Touraine Vallée de l'Indre

Government
  - Mayor (2020–2026): Sylvie Tessier
- Area^{1}: 10 km^{2} (3.9 sq mi)
- Highest elevation: 98 m (322 ft)
- Lowest elevation: 36 m (118 ft)
- Population (2023): 1,318
  - Density: 130/km^{2} (340/sq mi)
- Demonym(s): Lignérois, Lignéroises
- Time zone: UTC+01:00 (CET)
  - Summer (DST): UTC+02:00 (CEST)
- INSEE/Postal code: 37128 /37130
- ^{1} French Land Register data, which excludes lakes, ponds, glaciers > 1 km^{2} (0.386 sq mi or 247 acres) and river estuaries.

Lignières-de-Touraine (French pronunciation: [liɲjɛʁ də tuʁɛn]; literally "Lignières of Touraine") is a commune in the Indre-et-Loire department in central France.

== Population ==
Historical population
Year	Pop.	±% p.a.
1968	957	—
1975	1,018	+0.89%
1982	957	−0.88%
1990	974	+0.22%
1999	928	−0.54%
2007	1,012	+1.09%
2012	1,236	+4.08%
2017	1,308	+1.14%
2023	1,318	+0.13%
Source: INSEE

== See also ==
- Communes of the Indre-et-Loire department
