= Canton of Saint-Cyr-sur-Loire =

Coordinates: 47.40°N 0.66°E

The canton of Saint-Cyr-sur-Loire is an administrative division of the Indre-et-Loire department, central France. Its borders were modified at the French canton reorganisation which came into effect in March 2015. Its seat is in Saint-Cyr-sur-Loire.

It consists of the following communes:

1. Fondettes
2. Luynes
3. La Membrolle-sur-Choisille
4. Saint-Cyr-sur-Loire
5. Saint-Étienne-de-Chigny
