= Rivarennes, Indre-et-Loire =

Rivarennes
- Commune
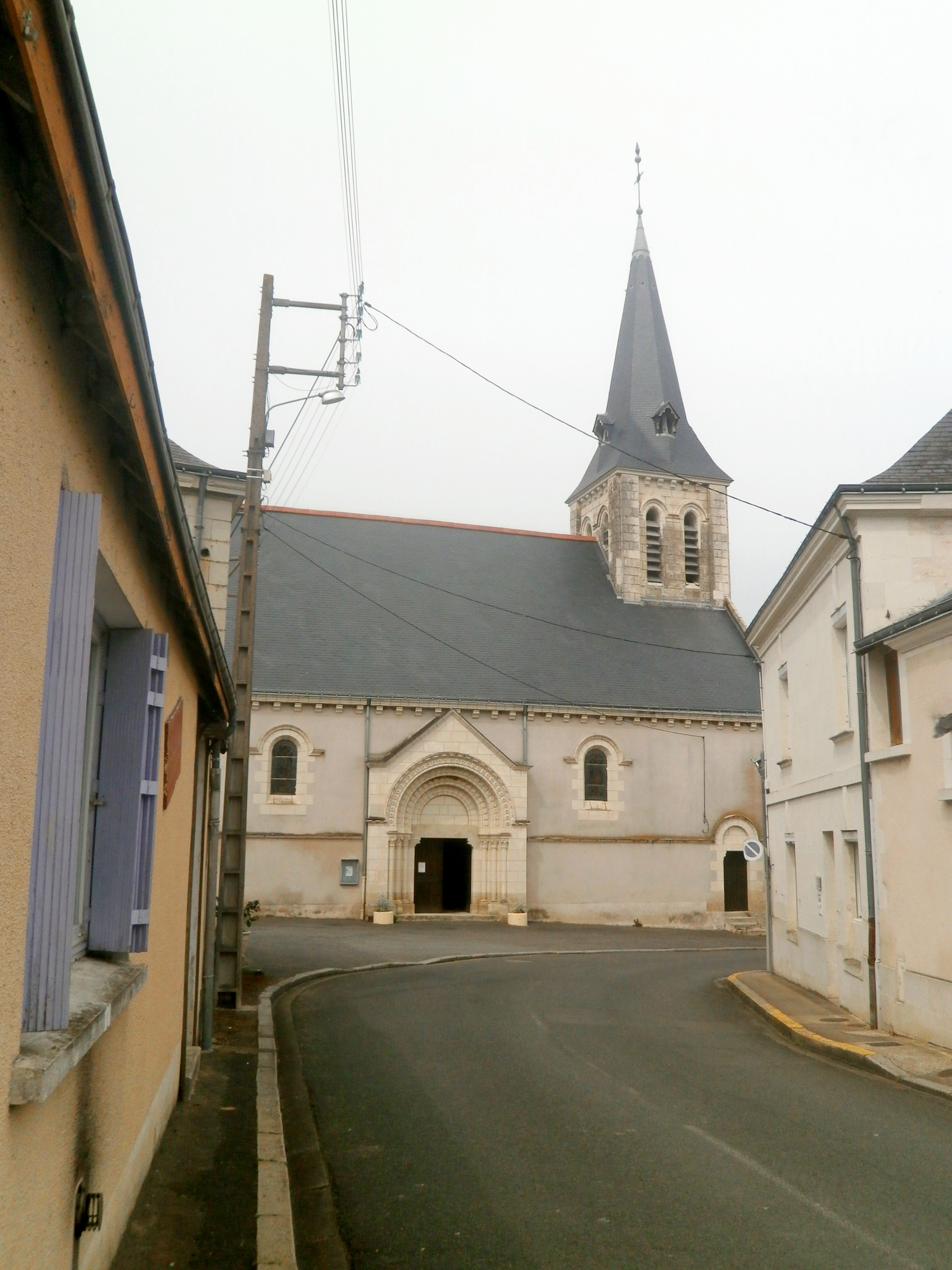
- Church in Rivarennes
- Location of Rivarennes
- Location within France Location within Centre-Val de Loire
- Coordinates: 47°16′02″N 0°21′17″E
- Country: France
- Region: Centre-Val de Loire
- Department: Indre-et-Loire
- Arrondissement: Tours
- Canton: Chinon

Government
  - Mayor (2020–2026): Agnès Bureau
- Area^{1}: 18.92 km^{2} (7.31 sq mi)
- Highest elevation: 121 m (397 ft)
- Lowest elevation: 36 m (118 ft)
- Population (2023): 1,000
  - Density: 53/km^{2} (140/sq mi)
- Time zone: UTC+01:00 (CET)
  - Summer (DST): UTC+02:00 (CEST)
- INSEE/Postal code: 37200 /37190
- ^{1} French Land Register data, which excludes lakes, ponds, glaciers > 1 km^{2} (0.386 sq mi or 247 acres) and river estuaries.

Rivarennes (French pronunciation: [ʁivaʁɛn]) is a commune in the Indre-et-Loire department in central France.

== Population ==
Historical population
Year	Pop.	±% p.a.
1968	725	—
1975	723	−0.04%
1982	687	−0.73%
1990	712	+0.45%
1999	713	+0.02%
2007	880	+2.67%
2012	1,030	+3.20%
2017	1,004	−0.51%
2023	1,000	−0.07%
Source: INSEE

== See also ==
- Communes of the Indre-et-Loire department
