= Cheillé =

- Commune
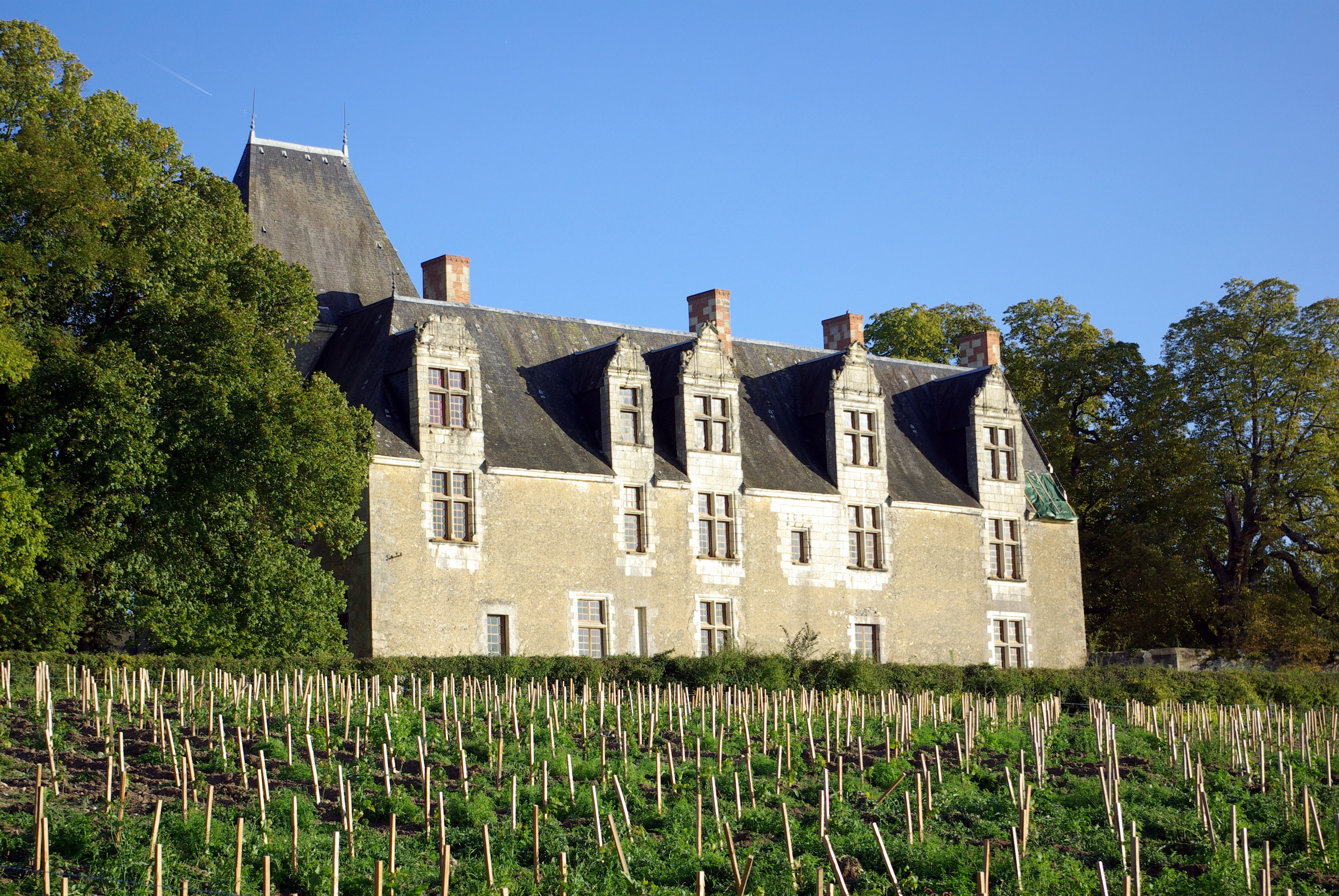
- Chateau of Cour-au-Berruyer
- Location of Cheillé
- Location within France Location within Centre-Val de Loire
- Coordinates: 47°15′19″N 0°27′43″E
- Country: France
- Region: Centre-Val de Loire
- Department: Indre-et-Loire
- Arrondissement: Tours
- Canton: Chinon

Government
  - Mayor (2020–2026): Fabien Barreau
- Area^{1}: 46.26 km^{2} (17.86 sq mi)
- Highest elevation: 120 m (390 ft)
- Lowest elevation: 37 m (121 ft)
- Population (2023): 1,907
  - Density: 41.22/km^{2} (106.8/sq mi)
- Time zone: UTC+01:00 (CET)
  - Summer (DST): UTC+02:00 (CEST)
- INSEE/Postal code: 37067 /37190
- ^{1} French Land Register data, which excludes lakes, ponds, glaciers > 1 km^{2} (0.386 sq mi or 247 acres) and river estuaries.

Cheillé (French pronunciation: [ʃɛje]) is a commune in the Indre-et-Loire department in central France.

== Population ==
Historical population
Year	Pop.	±% p.a.
1968	1,224	—
1975	1,310	+0.97%
1982	1,230	−0.90%
1990	1,191	−0.40%
1999	1,283	+0.83%
2007	1,527	+2.20%
2012	1,727	+2.49%
2017	1,801	+0.84%
2023	1,907	+0.96%
Source: INSEE

== See also ==
- Communes of the Indre-et-Loire department
