= Seuilly =

- Commune
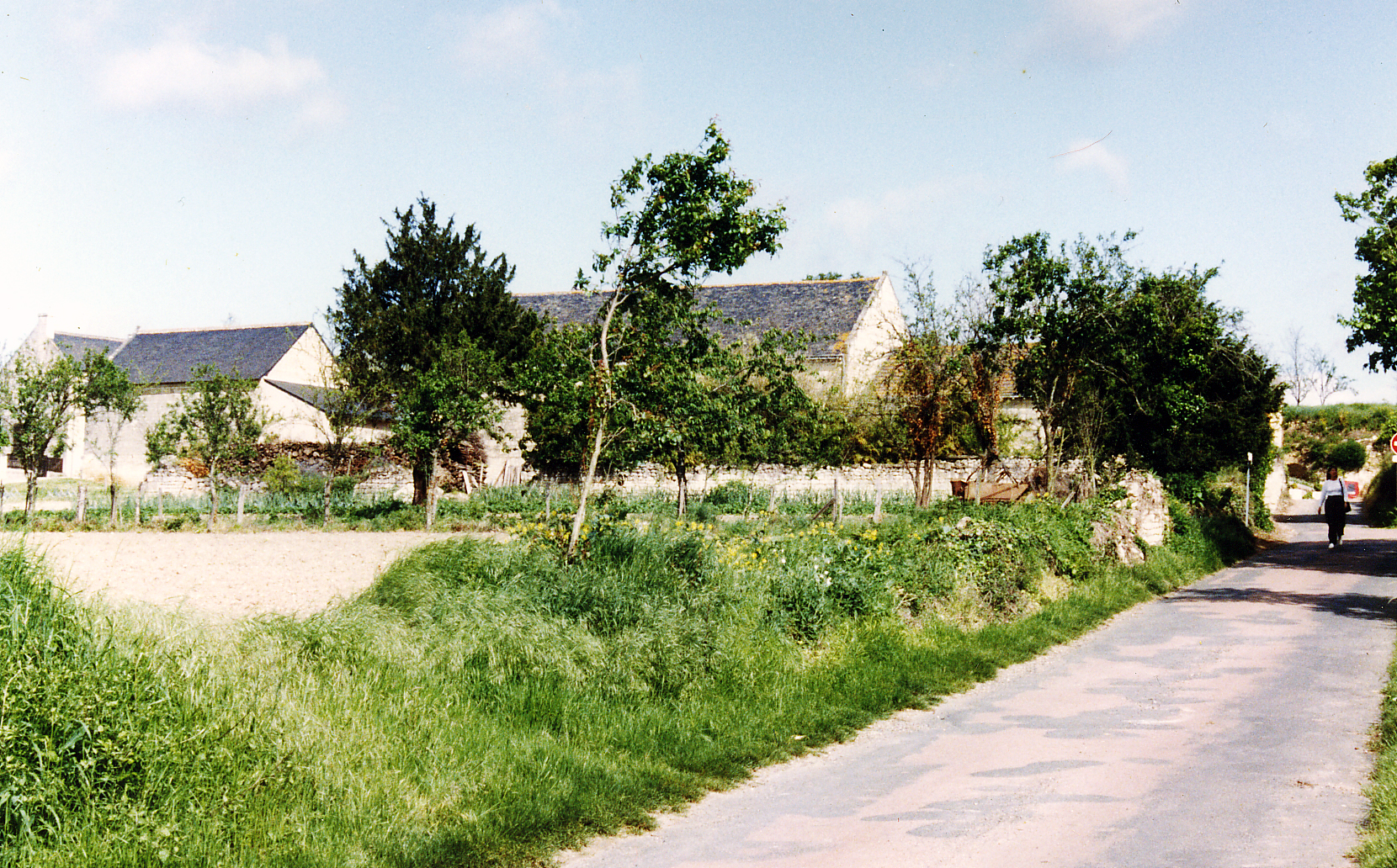
- The Rabelais Museum, La Devinière House
- Location of Seuilly
- Location within France Location within Centre-Val de Loire
- Coordinates: 47°08′05″N 0°10′21″E
- Country: France
- Region: Centre-Val de Loire
- Department: Indre-et-Loire
- Arrondissement: Chinon
- Canton: Chinon

Government
  - Mayor (2020–2026): Thierry Deguingand
- Area^{1}: 15.73 km^{2} (6.07 sq mi)
- Highest elevation: 111 m (364 ft)
- Lowest elevation: 35 m (115 ft)
- Population (2023): 368
  - Density: 23.4/km^{2} (60.6/sq mi)
- Time zone: UTC+01:00 (CET)
  - Summer (DST): UTC+02:00 (CEST)
- INSEE/Postal code: 37248 /37500
- ^{1} French Land Register data, which excludes lakes, ponds, glaciers > 1 km^{2} (0.386 sq mi or 247 acres) and river estuaries.

Seuilly (French pronunciation: [sœji]) is a commune in the Indre-et-Loire department in central France.

== Population ==
Historical population
Year	Pop.	±% p.a.
1968	358	—
1975	331	−1.11%
1982	338	+0.30%
1990	366	+1.00%
1999	369	+0.09%
2007	375	+0.20%
2012	346	−1.60%
2017	359	+0.74%
2023	368	+0.41%
Source: INSEE

== Sights ==
La Devinière, in Seuilly, houses a museum dedicated to François Rabelais, and is claimed to be the writer's birthplace.

== See also ==
- Communes of the Indre-et-Loire department
