= Saint-Germain-sur-Vienne =

- Commune
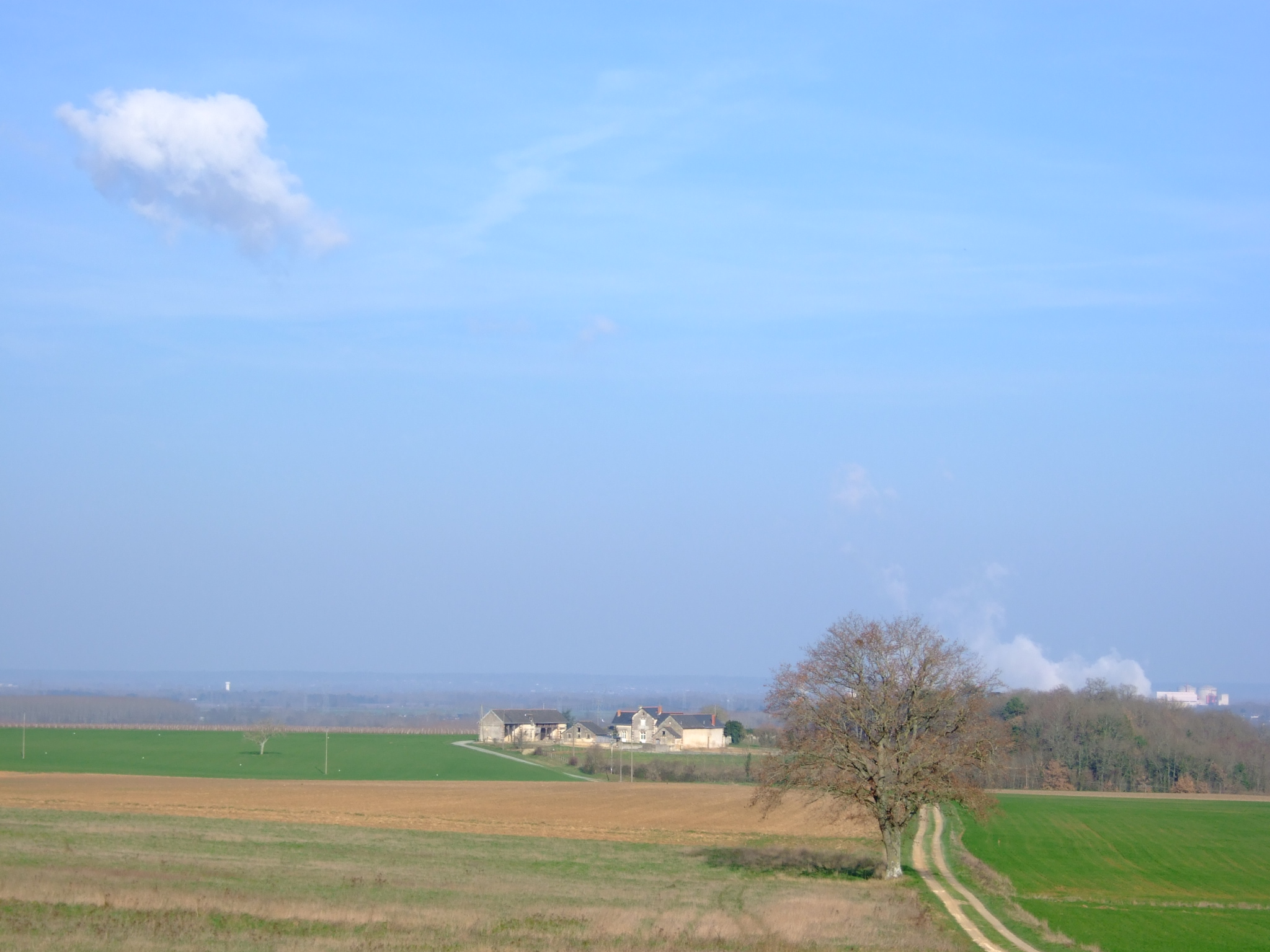
- Location of Saint-Germain-sur-Vienne
- Location within France Location within Centre-Val de Loire
- Coordinates: 47°10′55″N 0°07′19″E
- Country: France
- Region: Centre-Val de Loire
- Department: Indre-et-Loire
- Arrondissement: Chinon
- Canton: Chinon

Government
  - Mayor (2020–2026): Aline Plouzeau
- Area^{1}: 13.36 km^{2} (5.16 sq mi)
- Highest elevation: 105 m (344 ft)
- Lowest elevation: 27 m (89 ft)
- Population (2023): 360
  - Density: 27/km^{2} (70/sq mi)
- Time zone: UTC+01:00 (CET)
  - Summer (DST): UTC+02:00 (CEST)
- INSEE/Postal code: 37220 /37500
- ^{1} French Land Register data, which excludes lakes, ponds, glaciers > 1 km^{2} (0.386 sq mi or 247 acres) and river estuaries.

Saint-Germain-sur-Vienne (French pronunciation: [sɛ̃ ʒɛʁmɛ̃ syʁ vjɛn], literally Saint-Germain on Vienne) is a commune in the Indre-et-Loire department in central France.

== Population ==
Historical population
Year	Pop.	±% p.a.
1968	343	—
1975	324	−0.81%
1982	364	+1.68%
1990	356	−0.28%
1999	353	−0.09%
2007	352	−0.04%
2012	382	+1.65%
2017	375	−0.37%
2023	360	−0.68%
Source: INSEE

== See also ==
- Communes of the Indre-et-Loire department
