= La Ville-aux-Dames =

- Commune
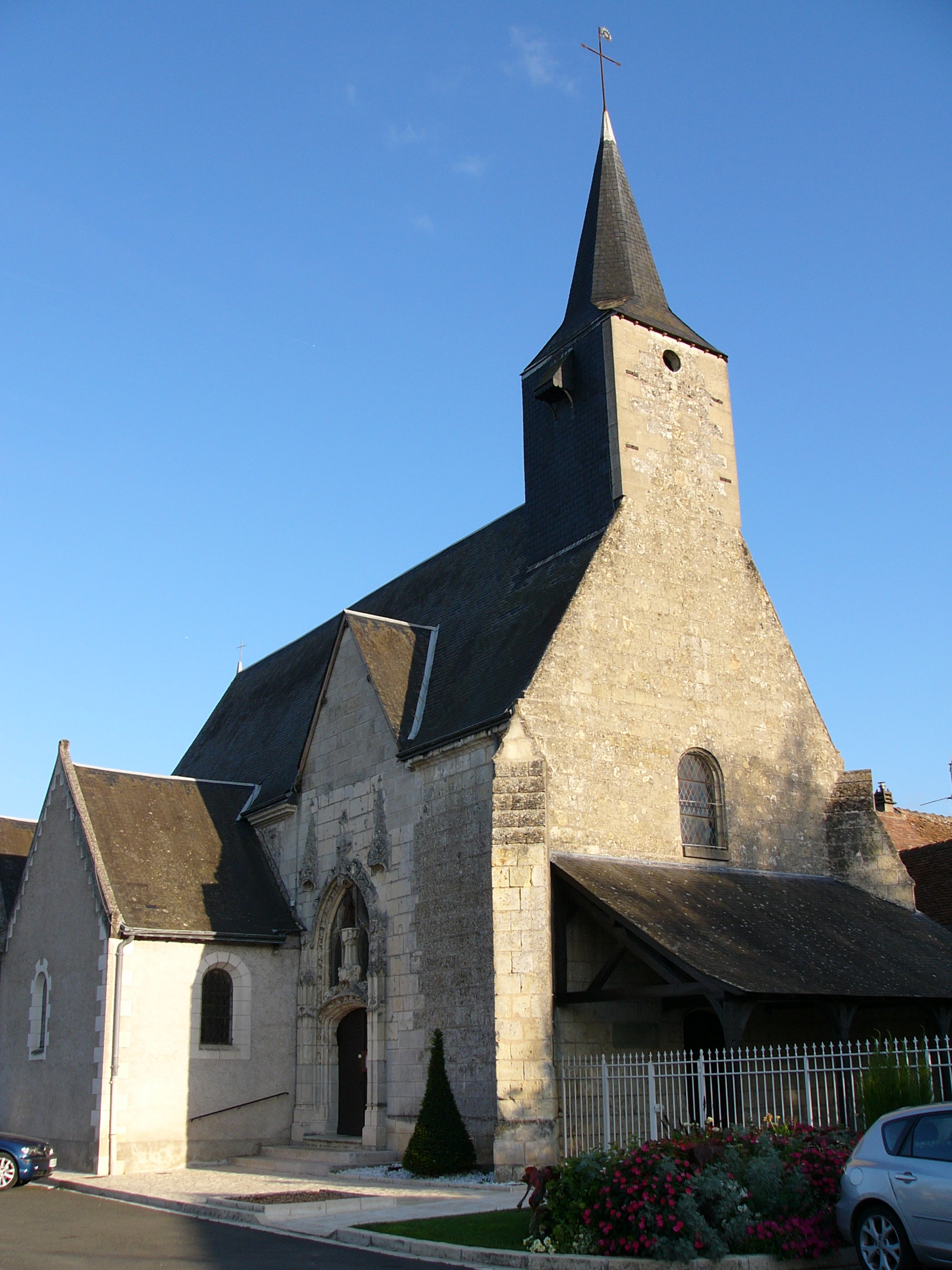
- The parish church of Our Lady, in La Ville-aux-Dames

- Coat of arms
- Location of La Ville-aux-Dames
- Location within France Location within Centre-Val de Loire
- Coordinates: 47°23′48″N 0°45′55″E
- Country: France
- Region: Centre-Val de Loire
- Department: Indre-et-Loire
- Arrondissement: Tours
- Canton: Montlouis-sur-Loire

Government
  - Mayor (2020–2026): Alain Bénard
- Area^{1}: 8 km^{2} (3.1 sq mi)
- Highest elevation: 52 m (171 ft)
- Lowest elevation: 46 m (151 ft)
- Population (2023): 5,606
  - Density: 700/km^{2} (1,800/sq mi)
- Time zone: UTC+01:00 (CET)
  - Summer (DST): UTC+02:00 (CEST)
- INSEE/Postal code: 37273 /37700
- ^{1} French Land Register data, which excludes lakes, ponds, glaciers > 1 km^{2} (0.386 sq mi or 247 acres) and river estuaries.

La Ville-aux-Dames (French pronunciation: [la vil o dam]) is a commune in the Indre-et-Loire department in central France.

== Population ==
Historical population

Year	Pop.	±% p.a.
1793	660	—
1800	551	−2.55%
1806	595	+1.29%
1821	675	+0.84%
1831	657	−0.27%
1836	635	−0.68%
1841	632	−0.09%
1846	661	+0.90%
1851	644	−0.52%
1856	606	−1.21%
1861	580	−0.87%
1866	552	−0.98%
1872	533	−0.58%
1876	515	−0.86%
1881	506	−0.35%
1886	478	−1.13%
1891	502	+0.98%
1896	535	+1.28%
1901	508	−1.03%

Year	Pop.	±% p.a.
1906	539	+1.19%
1911	592	+1.89%
1921	620	+0.46%
1926	670	+1.56%
1931	684	+0.41%
1936	722	+1.09%
1946	783	+0.81%
1954	1,001	+3.12%
1962	1,420	+4.47%
1968	1,915	+5.11%
1975	2,479	+3.76%
1982	3,481	+4.97%
1990	4,193	+2.35%
1999	4,647	+1.15%
2007	4,700	+0.14%
2012	5,021	+1.33%
2017	5,487	+1.79%
2023	5,606	+0.36%

Source: EHESS and INSEE (1968–2023)

== See also ==
- Communes of the Indre-et-Loire department
