= Beaumont-en-Véron =

- Commune
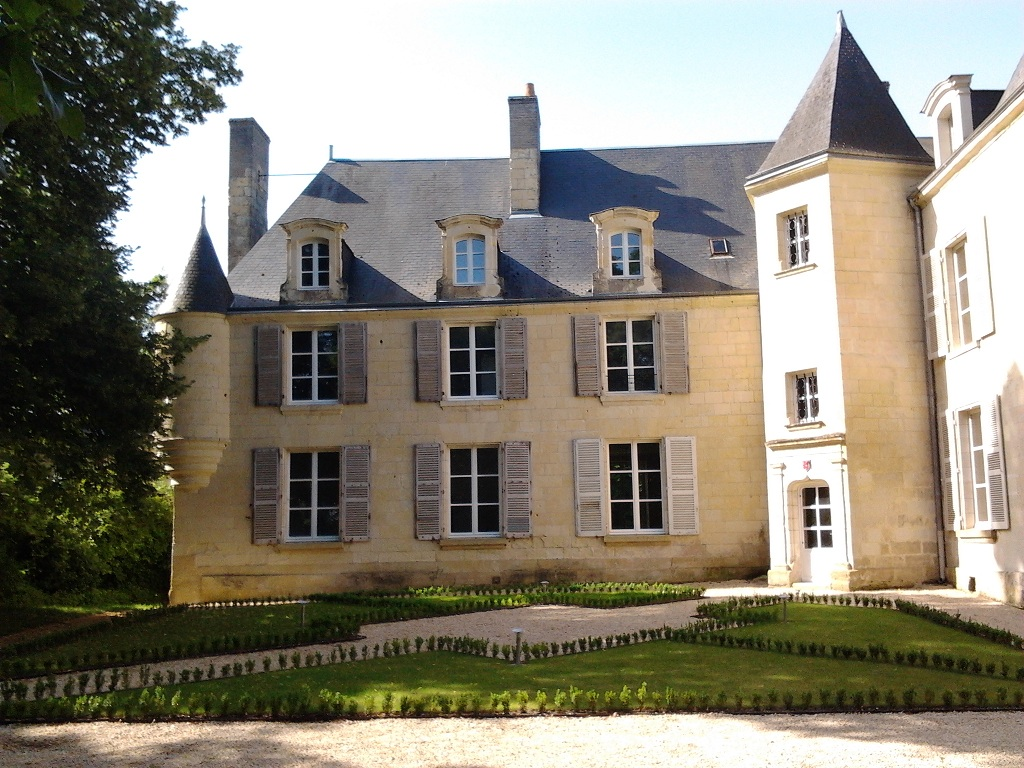
- The Château d'Isore
- Location of Beaumont-en-Véron
- Location within France Location within Centre-Val de Loire
- Coordinates: 47°11′48″N 0°11′14″E
- Country: France
- Region: Centre-Val de Loire
- Department: Indre-et-Loire
- Arrondissement: Chinon
- Canton: Chinon

Government
  - Mayor (2020–2026): Vincent Naulet
- Area^{1}: 18.83 km^{2} (7.27 sq mi)
- Highest elevation: 81 m (266 ft)
- Lowest elevation: 28 m (92 ft)
- Population (2023): 2,717
  - Density: 144.3/km^{2} (373.7/sq mi)
- Time zone: UTC+01:00 (CET)
  - Summer (DST): UTC+02:00 (CEST)
- INSEE/Postal code: 37022 /37420
- ^{1} French Land Register data, which excludes lakes, ponds, glaciers > 1 km^{2} (0.386 sq mi or 247 acres) and river estuaries.

Beaumont-en-Véron (French pronunciation: [bomɔ̃ ɑ̃ veʁɔ̃]) is a commune in the Indre-et-Loire department in central France. Since 2016, the castle has been home to Pontourny, the first deradicalisation centre for young people in France. By 2017, the centre was empty but remained open.

== Population ==
Historical population

Year	Pop.	±% p.a.
1793	1,480	—
1800	1,515	+0.33%
1806	1,748	+2.41%
1821	1,753	+0.02%
1831	1,863	+0.61%
1836	1,904	+0.44%
1841	1,808	−1.03%
1846	1,842	+0.37%
1851	1,835	−0.08%
1856	1,783	−0.57%
1861	1,777	−0.07%
1866	1,718	−0.67%
1872	1,632	−0.85%
1876	1,572	−0.93%
1881	1,530	−0.54%
1886	1,500	−0.40%
1891	1,422	−1.06%
1896	1,360	−0.89%
1901	1,393	+0.48%

Year	Pop.	±% p.a.
1906	1,432	+0.55%
1911	1,411	−0.30%
1921	1,282	−0.95%
1926	1,146	−2.22%
1931	1,092	−0.96%
1936	1,121	+0.53%
1946	1,098	−0.21%
1954	1,259	+1.73%
1962	1,855	+4.96%
1968	1,967	+0.98%
1975	1,916	−0.37%
1982	2,459	+3.63%
1990	2,569	+0.55%
1999	2,757	+0.79%
2007	2,843	+0.38%
2012	2,753	−0.64%
2017	2,699	−0.40%
2023	2,717	+0.11%

Source: EHESS and INSEE (1968-2023)

== See also ==
- Communes of the Indre-et-Loire department
