= Rigny-Ussé =

- Commune
- Location of Rigny-Ussé
- Location within France Location within Centre-Val de Loire
- Coordinates: 47°15′11″N 0°18′00″E
- Country: France
- Region: Centre-Val de Loire
- Department: Indre-et-Loire
- Arrondissement: Tours
- Canton: Chinon

Government
  - Mayor (2020–2026): Jean-Jacques Gazave
- Area^{1}: 13.97 km^{2} (5.39 sq mi)
- Highest elevation: 109 m (358 ft)
- Lowest elevation: 35 m (115 ft)
- Population (2023): 512
  - Density: 36.6/km^{2} (94.9/sq mi)
- Time zone: UTC+01:00 (CET)
  - Summer (DST): UTC+02:00 (CEST)
- INSEE/Postal code: 37197 /37420
- ^{1} French Land Register data, which excludes lakes, ponds, glaciers > 1 km^{2} (0.386 sq mi or 247 acres) and river estuaries.

Rigny-Ussé (French pronunciation: [ʁiɲi yse]) is a commune in the Indre-et-Loire department in central France.

== Population ==
Historical population
Year	Pop.	±% p.a.
1968	580	—
1975	533	−1.20%
1982	511	−0.60%
1990	509	−0.05%
1999	506	−0.07%
2007	511	+0.12%
2012	521	+0.39%
2017	501	−0.78%
2023	512	+0.36%
Source: INSEE

== See also ==
- Communes of the Indre-et-Loire department
