= Candes-Saint-Martin =

- Commune
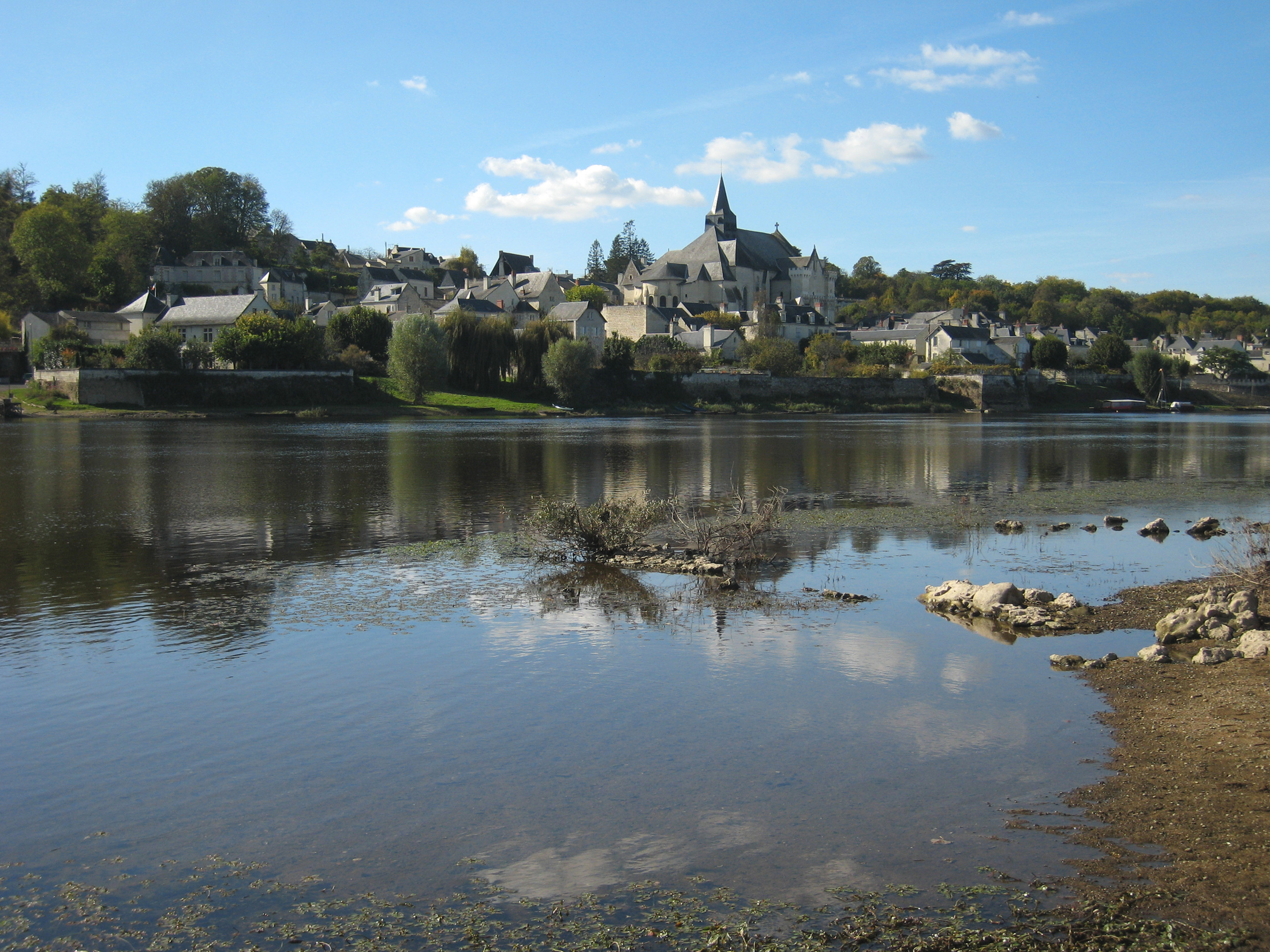
- View over the Loire

- Coat of arms
- Location of Candes-Saint-Martin
- Location within France Location within Centre-Val de Loire
- Coordinates: 47°12′42″N 0°04′27″E
- Country: France
- Region: Centre-Val de Loire
- Department: Indre-et-Loire
- Arrondissement: Chinon
- Canton: Chinon

Government
  - Mayor (2020–2026): Stéphan Pinaud
- Area^{1}: 5.77 km^{2} (2.23 sq mi)
- Highest elevation: 101 m (331 ft)
- Lowest elevation: 27 m (89 ft)
- Population (2023): 180
  - Density: 31/km^{2} (81/sq mi)
- Time zone: UTC+01:00 (CET)
  - Summer (DST): UTC+02:00 (CEST)
- INSEE/Postal code: 37042 /37500
- ^{1} French Land Register data, which excludes lakes, ponds, glaciers > 1 km^{2} (0.386 sq mi or 247 acres) and river estuaries.

Candes-Saint-Martin (French pronunciation: [kɑ̃d sɛ̃ maʁtɛ̃]) is a commune in the Indre-et-Loire department, central France. It overlooks the confluence of the Vienne and Loire rivers from a steep hill on the left bank of the Loire, and marks the boundary between the modern departments of Indre-et-Loire to the east, and Maine-et-Loire to the west. It is a member of Les Plus Beaux Villages de France (The Most Beautiful Villages of France) Association.

== Name ==
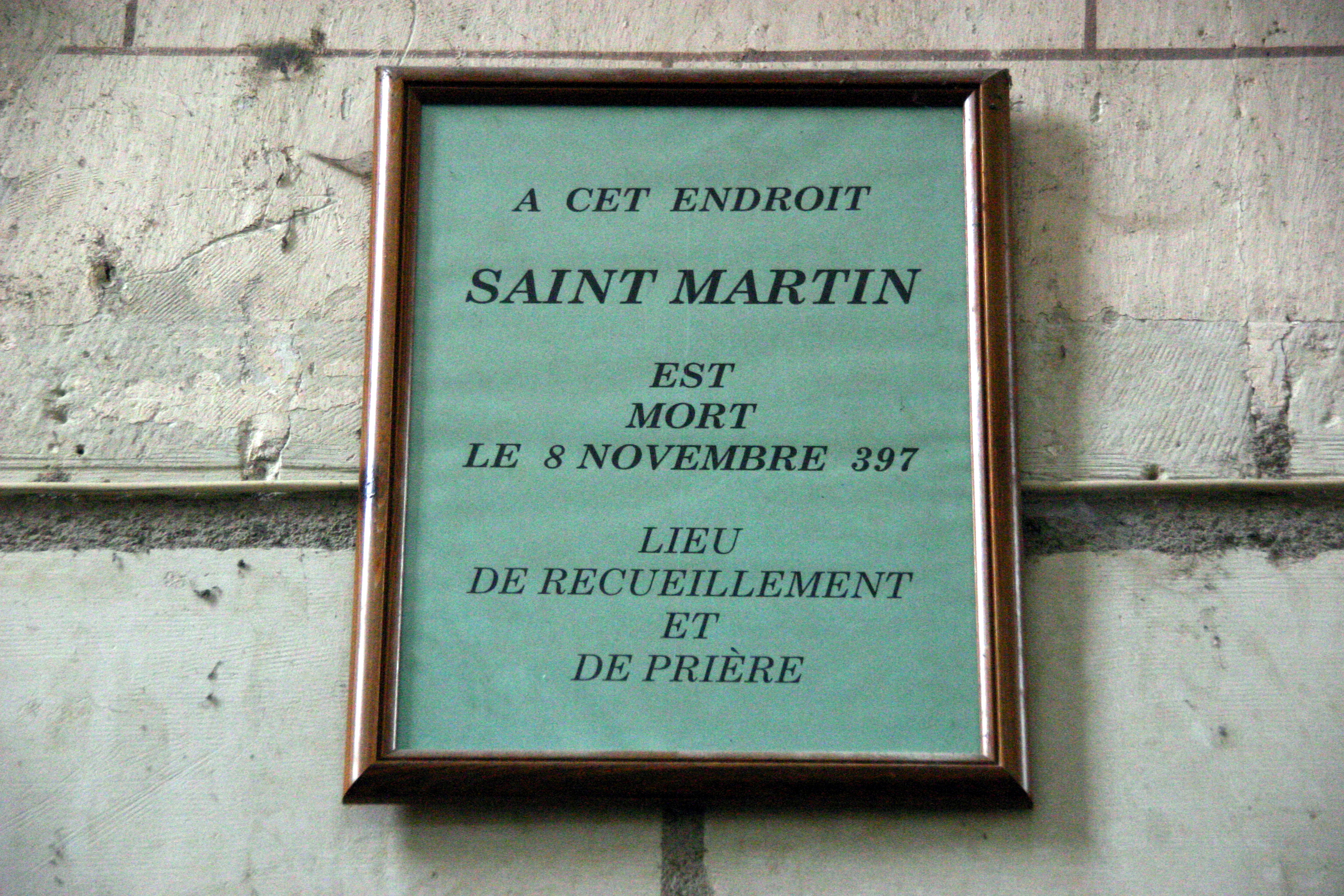

The name Candes is thought to derive from a Gallic word for confluence, and is found in several other similarly sited towns in the region; the termination Saint-Martin was formally added in 1949, although it had been in common usage for many years. Evidence of Gallo-Roman occupation was found in 19th century excavations, particularly in the grounds of the Bishop's Palace which crowns the hill.

The village takes its name - and its main claim to fame- from the magnificent church which has succeeded the 4th century monastery where St Martin, Bishop of Tours and 'Apostle to the Gauls', died in 397.

== Population ==
Historical population
Year	Pop.	±% p.a.
1968	264	—
1975	269	+0.27%
1982	268	−0.05%
1990	244	−1.17%
1999	227	−0.80%
2007	222	−0.28%
2012	226	+0.36%
2017	199	−2.51%
2023	180	−1.66%
Source: INSEE

== See also ==
- Communes of the Indre-et-Loire department
- Collegiate Church of Saint-Martin of Candes
