= Marçay, Indre-et-Loire =

Marçay
- Commune
- Location of Marçay
- Location within France Location within Centre-Val de Loire
- Coordinates: 47°06′03″N 0°13′06″E
- Country: France
- Region: Centre-Val de Loire
- Department: Indre-et-Loire
- Arrondissement: Chinon
- Canton: Chinon

Government
  - Mayor (2020–2026): Claude Bordier
- Area^{1}: 21.35 km^{2} (8.24 sq mi)
- Highest elevation: 97 m (318 ft)
- Lowest elevation: 37 m (121 ft)
- Population (2023): 465
  - Density: 21.8/km^{2} (56.4/sq mi)
- Time zone: UTC+01:00 (CET)
  - Summer (DST): UTC+02:00 (CEST)
- INSEE/Postal code: 37144 /37500
- ^{1} French Land Register data, which excludes lakes, ponds, glaciers > 1 km^{2} (0.386 sq mi or 247 acres) and river estuaries.

Marçay (French pronunciation: [maʁsɛ]) is a commune in the Indre-et-Loire department in central France.

== Population ==
Historical population
Year	Pop.	±% p.a.
1968	454	—
1975	413	−1.34%
1982	410	−0.10%
1990	416	+0.18%
1999	448	+0.83%
2007	467	+0.52%
2012	478	+0.47%
2017	519	+1.66%
2023	465	−1.81%
Source: INSEE

The inhabitants are called Marcéens in French.

== See also ==
- Communes of the Indre-et-Loire department
