= Mosnes =

- Commune
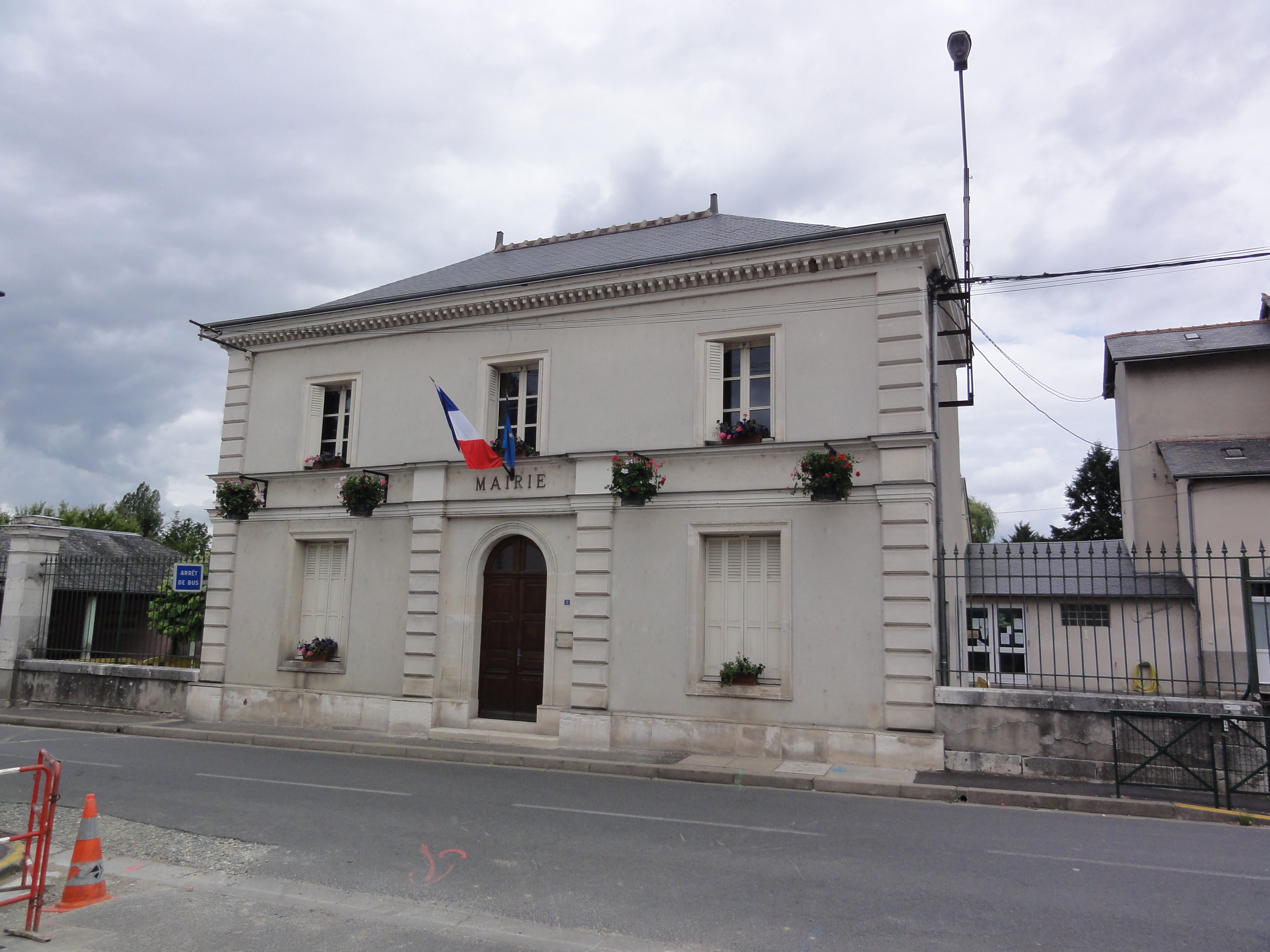
- The town hall in Mosnes
- Location of Mosnes
- Location within France Location within Centre-Val de Loire
- Coordinates: 47°27′23″N 1°06′06″E
- Country: France
- Region: Centre-Val de Loire
- Department: Indre-et-Loire
- Arrondissement: Loches
- Canton: Amboise

Government
  - Mayor (2020–2026): Christophe Villemain
- Area^{1}: 14.5 km^{2} (5.6 sq mi)
- Highest elevation: 114 m (374 ft)
- Lowest elevation: 55 m (180 ft)
- Population (2023): 812
  - Density: 56.0/km^{2} (145/sq mi)
- Time zone: UTC+01:00 (CET)
  - Summer (DST): UTC+02:00 (CEST)
- INSEE/Postal code: 37161 /37530
- ^{1} French Land Register data, which excludes lakes, ponds, glaciers > 1 km^{2} (0.386 sq mi or 247 acres) and river estuaries.

Mosnes (French pronunciation: [mon]) is a commune in the Indre-et-Loire department, central France.

== Population ==
Historical population
| Year | Pop. | ±% p.a. |
|---|---|---|
| 1968 | 639 | — |
| 1975 | 639 | +0.00% |
| 1982 | 675 | +0.79% |
| 1990 | 677 | +0.04% |
| 1999 | 736 | +0.93% |
| 2007 | 751 | +0.25% |
| 2012 | 740 | −0.29% |
| 2017 | 804 | +1.67% |
| 2023 | 812 | +0.17% |
Source: INSEE

== See also ==
- Communes of the Indre-et-Loire department
