= Avoine, Indre-et-Loire =

Avoine
- Commune
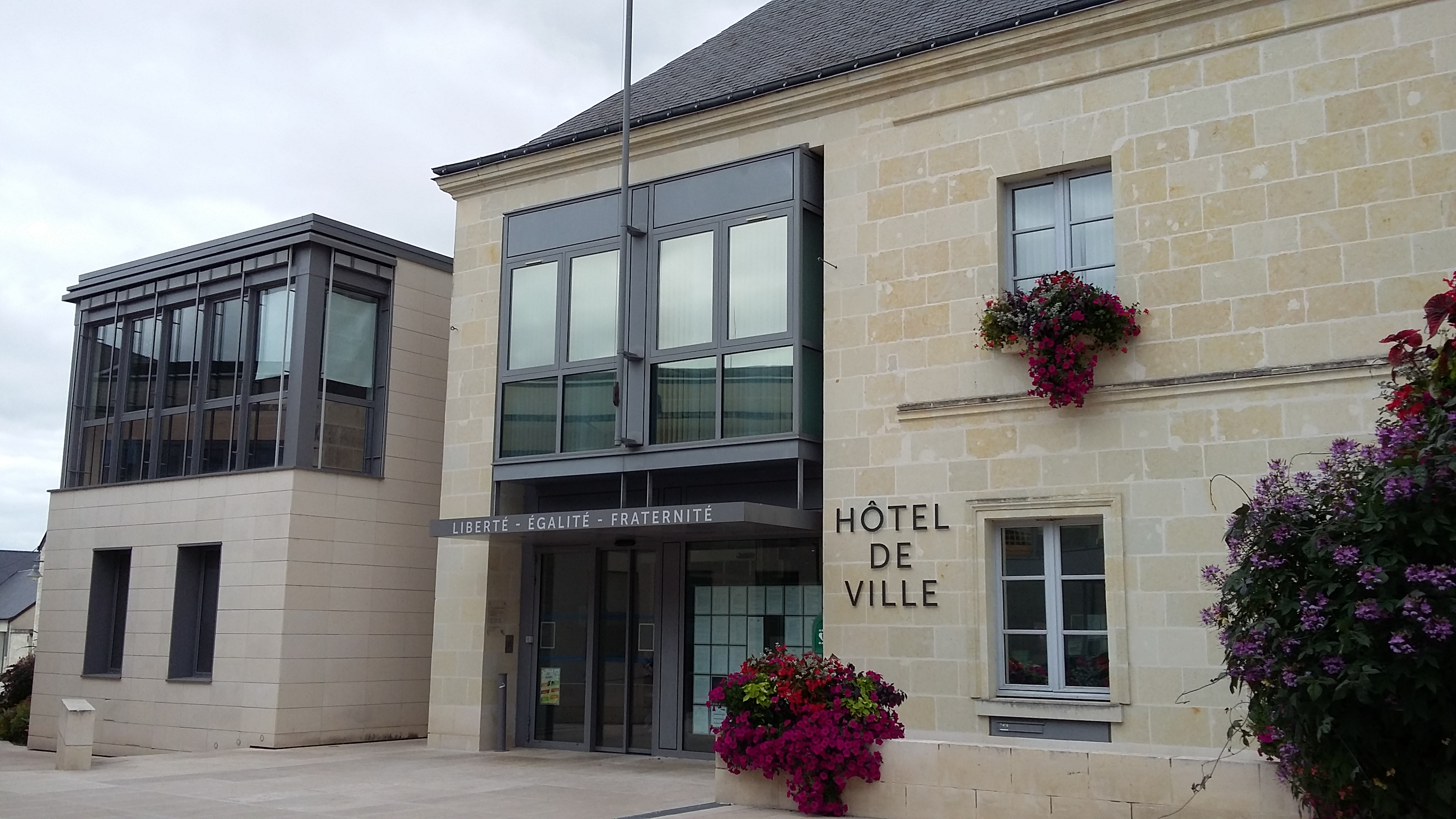
- Town hall
- Location of Avoine
- Location within France Location within Centre-Val de Loire
- Coordinates: 47°12′21″N 0°11′02″E
- Country: France
- Region: Centre-Val de Loire
- Department: Indre-et-Loire
- Arrondissement: Chinon
- Canton: Chinon
- Intercommunality: CC Chinon Vienne Loire

Government
  - Mayor (2020–2026): Didier Godoy
- Area^{1}: 12.58 km^{2} (4.86 sq mi)
- Highest elevation: 42 m (138 ft)
- Lowest elevation: 29 m (95 ft)
- Population (2023): 2,067
  - Density: 164.3/km^{2} (425.6/sq mi)
- Time zone: UTC+01:00 (CET)
  - Summer (DST): UTC+02:00 (CEST)
- INSEE/Postal code: 37011 /37420
- ^{1} French Land Register data, which excludes lakes, ponds, glaciers > 1 km^{2} (0.386 sq mi or 247 acres) and river estuaries.

Avoine (French pronunciation: [avwan]) is a commune in the Indre-et-Loire department in central France.

== Population ==
Historical population
| Year | Pop. | ±% p.a. |
|---|---|---|
| 1968 | 1,212 | — |
| 1975 | 1,331 | +1.35% |
| 1982 | 1,800 | +4.41% |
| 1990 | 1,664 | −0.98% |
| 1999 | 1,778 | +0.74% |
| 2007 | 1,854 | +0.52% |
| 2012 | 1,811 | −0.47% |
| 2017 | 1,743 | −0.76% |
| 2023 | 2,067 | +2.88% |
Source: INSEE

== See also ==
- Avoine OCC, an association football club based in the commune
- Communes of the Indre-et-Loire department
