= Rivière, Indre-et-Loire =

Rivière
- Commune
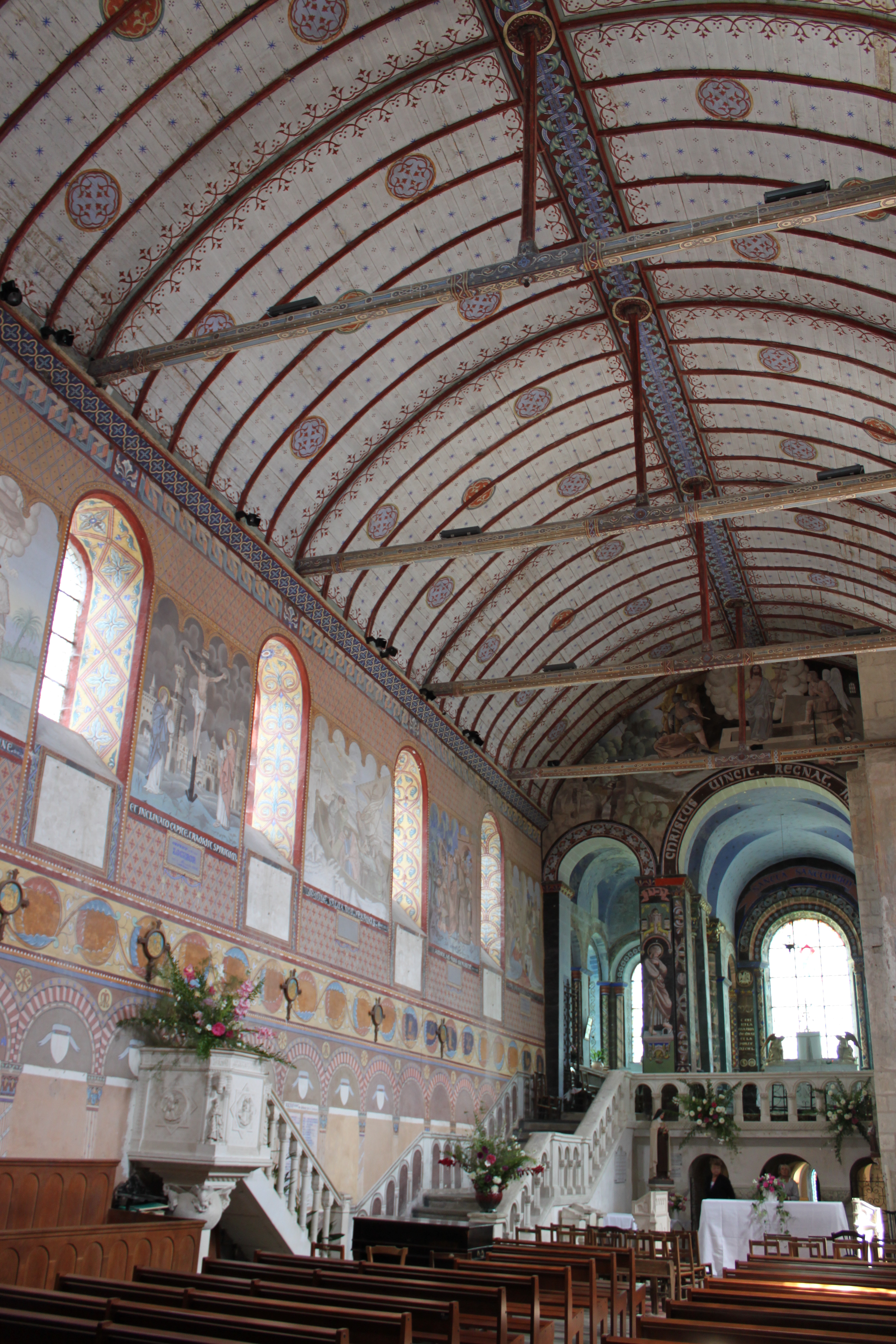
- The interior of the church of Our Lady, in Rivière
- Location of Rivière
- Location within France Location within Centre-Val de Loire
- Coordinates: 47°08′47″N 0°16′50″E
- Country: France
- Region: Centre-Val de Loire
- Department: Indre-et-Loire
- Arrondissement: Chinon
- Canton: Chinon

Government
  - Mayor (2020–2026): Martine Luneteau
- Area^{1}: 3.66 km^{2} (1.41 sq mi)
- Highest elevation: 107 m (351 ft)
- Lowest elevation: 28 m (92 ft)
- Population (2023): 699
  - Density: 191/km^{2} (495/sq mi)
- Time zone: UTC+01:00 (CET)
  - Summer (DST): UTC+02:00 (CEST)
- INSEE/Postal code: 37201 /37500
- ^{1} French Land Register data, which excludes lakes, ponds, glaciers > 1 km^{2} (0.386 sq mi or 247 acres) and river estuaries.

Rivière (French pronunciation: [ʁivjɛʁ]) is a commune in the Indre-et-Loire department in central France.

== Population ==
Historical population
Year	Pop.	±% p.a.
1968	321	—
1975	371	+2.09%
1982	452	+2.86%
1990	573	+3.01%
1999	625	+0.97%
2007	658	+0.65%
2012	746	+2.54%
2017	696	−1.38%
2023	699	+0.07%
Source: INSEE

The inhabitants are called Ripérains in French.

== See also ==
- Communes of the Indre-et-Loire department
