= La Roche-Clermault =

- Commune
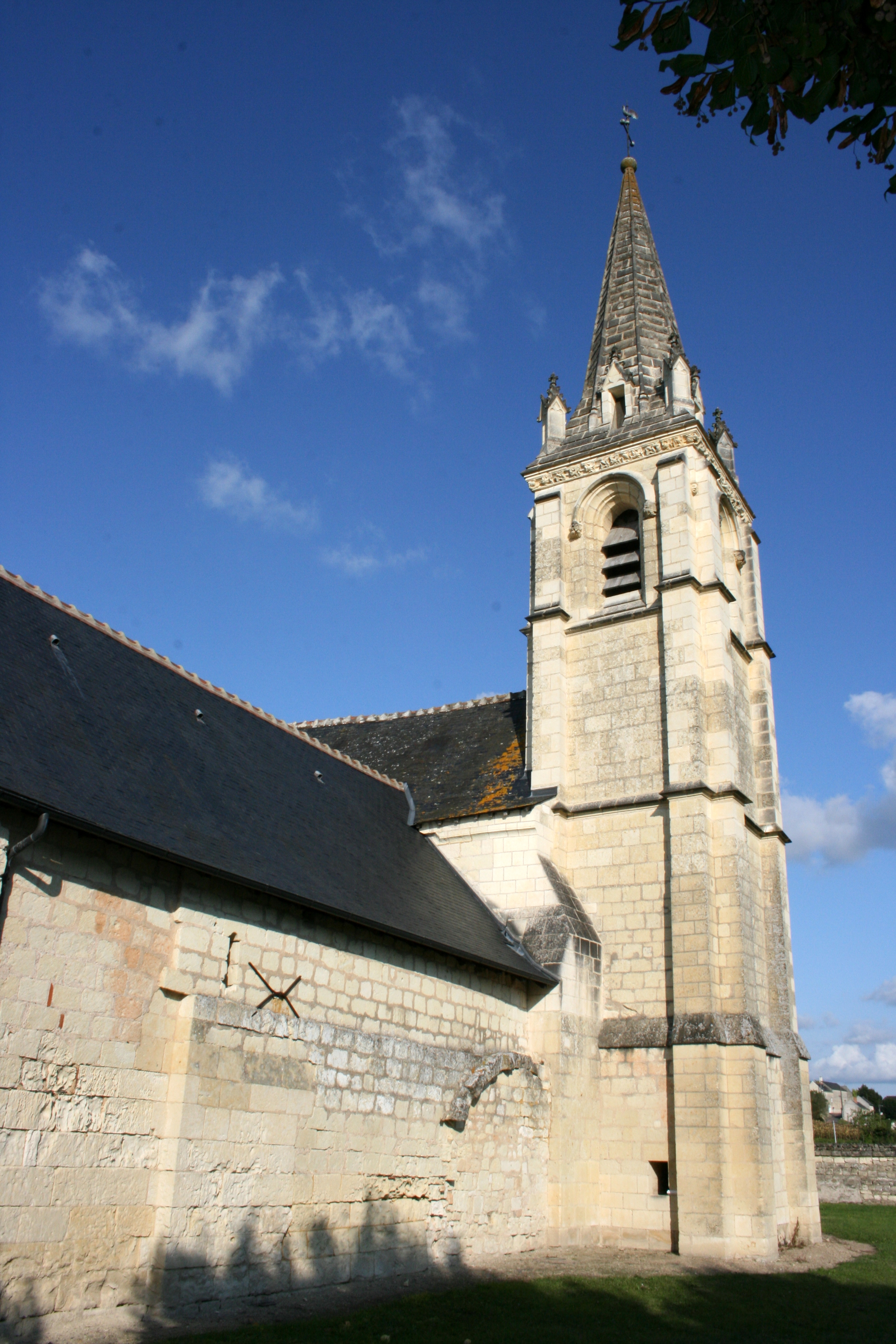
- The church of Saint-Martin, in La Roche-Clermault
- Location of La Roche-Clermault
- Location within France Location within Centre-Val de Loire
- Coordinates: 47°08′19″N 0°12′12″E
- Country: France
- Region: Centre-Val de Loire
- Department: Indre-et-Loire
- Arrondissement: Chinon
- Canton: Chinon

Government
  - Mayor (2020–2026): Jérôme Field
- Area^{1}: 18.03 km^{2} (6.96 sq mi)
- Highest elevation: 112 m (367 ft)
- Lowest elevation: 30 m (98 ft)
- Population (2023): 540
  - Density: 30/km^{2} (78/sq mi)
- Time zone: UTC+01:00 (CET)
  - Summer (DST): UTC+02:00 (CEST)
- INSEE/Postal code: 37202 /37500
- ^{1} French Land Register data, which excludes lakes, ponds, glaciers > 1 km^{2} (0.386 sq mi or 247 acres) and river estuaries.

La Roche-Clermault (French pronunciation: [la ʁɔʃ klɛʁmo]) is a commune in the Indre-et-Loire department in central France.

== Population ==
Historical population
Year	Pop.	±% p.a.
1968	519	—
1975	470	−1.41%
1982	446	−0.75%
1990	456	+0.28%
1999	479	+0.55%
2007	507	+0.71%
2012	495	−0.48%
2017	518	+0.91%
2023	540	+0.70%
Source: INSEE

== See also ==
- Communes of the Indre-et-Loire department
