= Huismes =

- Commune
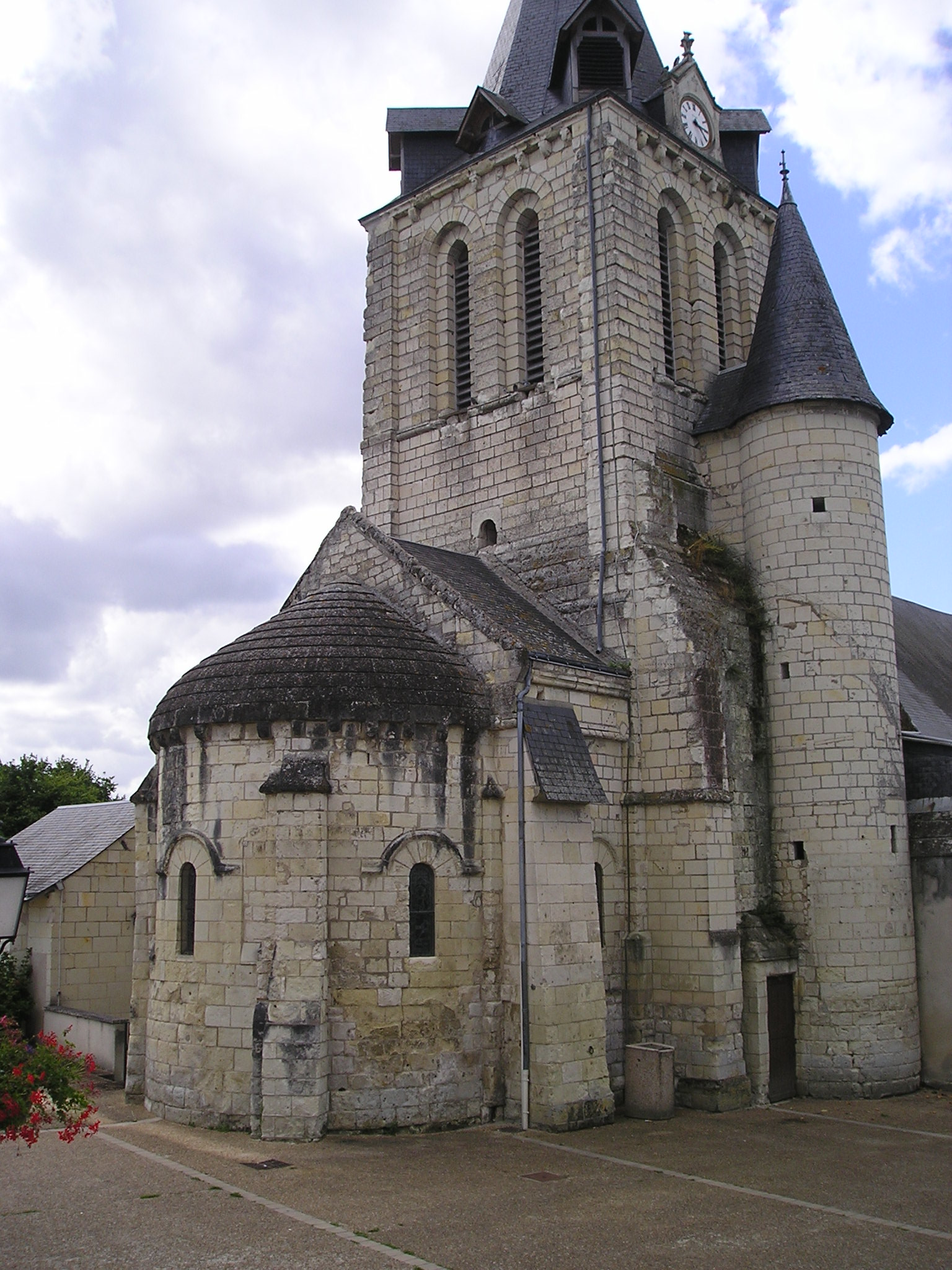
- The church of Saint-Maurice, in Huismes
- Location of Huismes
- Location within France Location within Centre-Val de Loire
- Coordinates: 47°14′00″N 0°15′12″E
- Country: France
- Region: Centre-Val de Loire
- Department: Indre-et-Loire
- Arrondissement: Chinon
- Canton: Chinon

Government
  - Mayor (2020–2026): Denis Moutardier
- Area^{1}: 23.82 km^{2} (9.20 sq mi)
- Highest elevation: 118 m (387 ft)
- Lowest elevation: 31 m (102 ft)
- Population (2023): 1,498
  - Density: 62.89/km^{2} (162.9/sq mi)
- Time zone: UTC+01:00 (CET)
  - Summer (DST): UTC+02:00 (CEST)
- INSEE/Postal code: 37118 /37420
- ^{1} French Land Register data, which excludes lakes, ponds, glaciers > 1 km^{2} (0.386 sq mi or 247 acres) and river estuaries.

Huismes (French pronunciation: [ɥim]) is a commune in the Indre-et-Loire department in central France.

== Population ==
Historical population
Year	Pop.	±% p.a.
1968	1,122	—
1975	1,031	−1.20%
1982	1,132	+1.34%
1990	1,397	+2.66%
1999	1,390	−0.06%
2007	1,505	+1.00%
2012	1,545	+0.53%
2017	1,475	−0.92%
2023	1,498	+0.26%
Source: INSEE

== See also ==
- Communes of the Indre-et-Loire department
