= Lerné =

- Commune
- Location of Lerné
- Location within France Location within Centre-Val de Loire
- Coordinates: 47°08′10″N 0°07′24″E
- Country: France
- Region: Centre-Val de Loire
- Department: Indre-et-Loire
- Arrondissement: Chinon
- Canton: Chinon

Government
  - Mayor (2020–2026): Maurice Lesourd
- Area^{1}: 16.36 km^{2} (6.32 sq mi)
- Highest elevation: 117 m (384 ft)
- Lowest elevation: 43 m (141 ft)
- Population (2023): 351
  - Density: 21.5/km^{2} (55.6/sq mi)
- Time zone: UTC+01:00 (CET)
  - Summer (DST): UTC+02:00 (CEST)
- INSEE/Postal code: 37126 /37500
- ^{1} French Land Register data, which excludes lakes, ponds, glaciers > 1 km^{2} (0.386 sq mi or 247 acres) and river estuaries.

Lerné (French pronunciation: [lɛʁne]) is a commune in the Indre-et-Loire department in central France.

== Population ==
Historical population
Year	Pop.	±% p.a.
1968	429	—
1975	370	−2.09%
1982	338	−1.28%
1990	330	−0.30%
1999	312	−0.62%
2007	339	+1.04%
2012	318	−1.27%
2017	296	−1.42%
2023	351	+2.88%
Source: INSEE

== See also ==
- Communes of the Indre-et-Loire department
