= Bréhémont =

- Commune
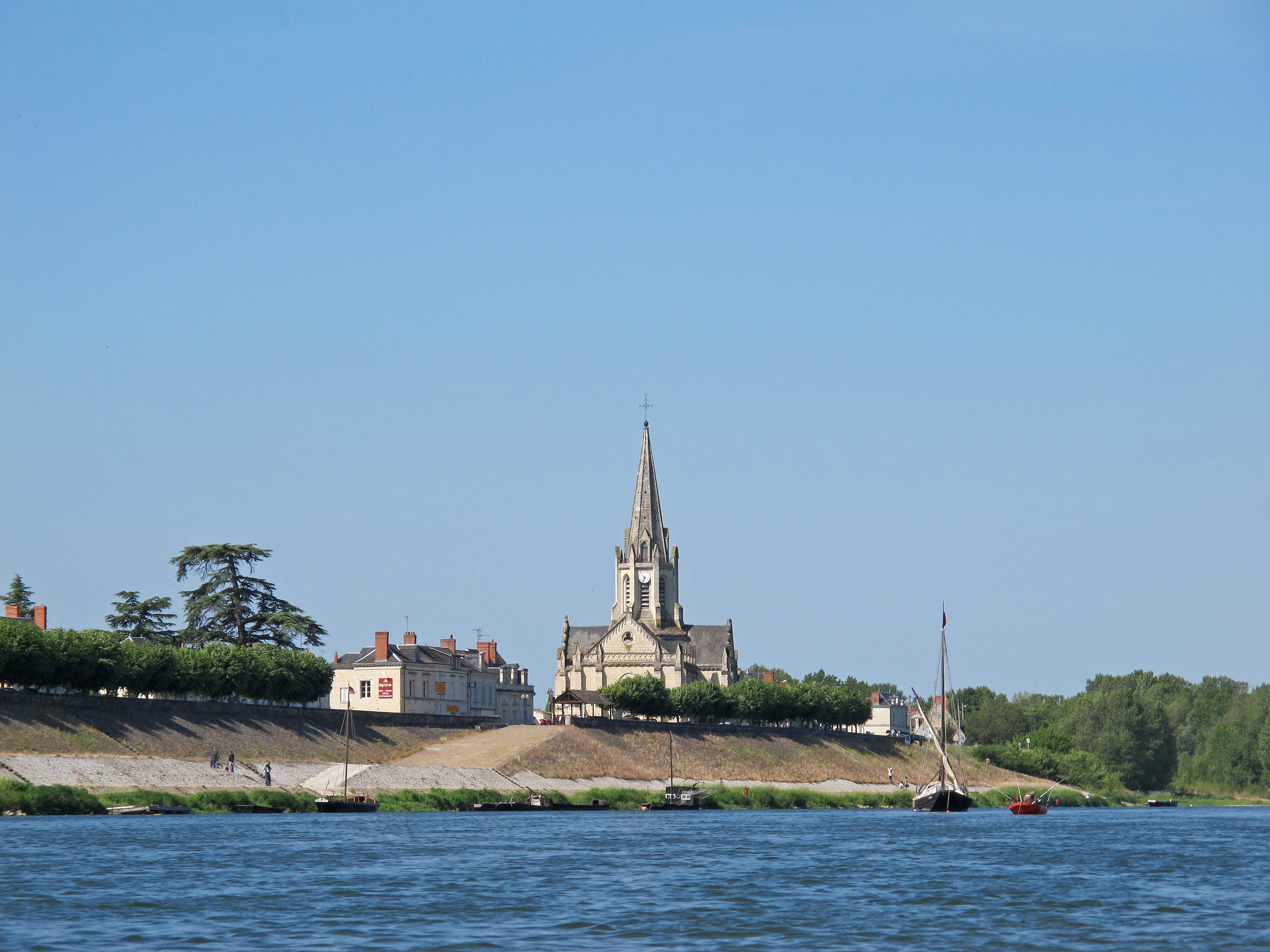
- The church in Bréhémont
- Location of Bréhémont
- Location within France Location within Centre-Val de Loire
- Coordinates: 47°17′45″N 0°21′23″E
- Country: France
- Region: Centre-Val de Loire
- Department: Indre-et-Loire
- Arrondissement: Tours
- Canton: Chinon

Government
  - Mayor (2020–2026): Alexandre Truissard
- Area^{1}: 12.71 km^{2} (4.91 sq mi)
- Highest elevation: 40 m (130 ft)
- Lowest elevation: 32 m (105 ft)
- Population (2023): 737
  - Density: 58.0/km^{2} (150/sq mi)
- Time zone: UTC+01:00 (CET)
  - Summer (DST): UTC+02:00 (CEST)
- INSEE/Postal code: 37038 /37130
- ^{1} French Land Register data, which excludes lakes, ponds, glaciers > 1 km^{2} (0.386 sq mi or 247 acres) and river estuaries.

Bréhémont (French pronunciation: [bʁe.emɔ̃]) is a commune in the Indre-et-Loire department in central France.

== Population ==
Historical population
Year	Pop.	±% p.a.
1968	771	—
1975	672	−1.94%
1982	678	+0.13%
1990	685	+0.13%
1999	716	+0.49%
2007	809	+1.54%
2012	785	−0.60%
2017	769	−0.41%
2023	737	−0.71%
Source: INSEE

== See also ==
- Communes of the Indre-et-Loire department
