= Cinais =

- Commune
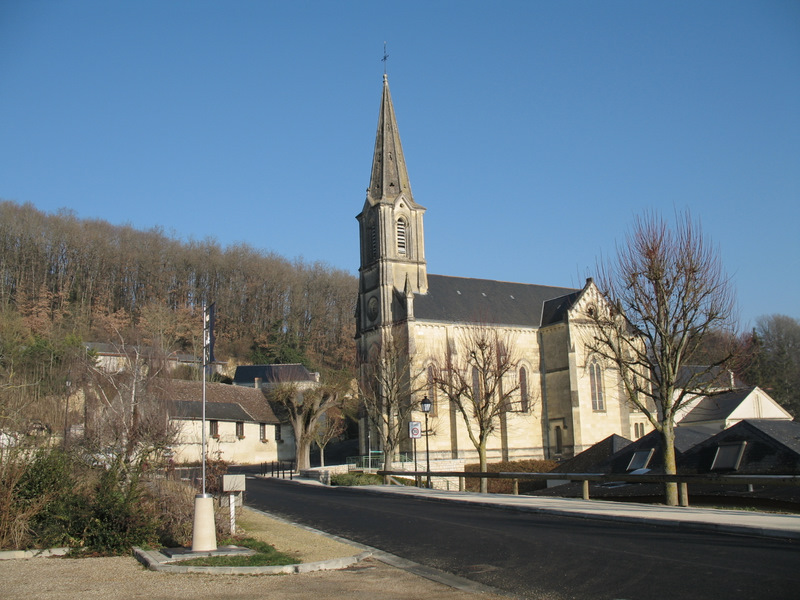
- The church in Cinais
- Location of Cinais
- Location within France Location within Centre-Val de Loire
- Coordinates: 47°08′57″N 0°10′58″E
- Country: France
- Region: Centre-Val de Loire
- Department: Indre-et-Loire
- Arrondissement: Chinon
- Canton: Chinon

Government
  - Mayor (2020–2026): Denis Fouché
- Area^{1}: 8.77 km^{2} (3.39 sq mi)
- Highest elevation: 107 m (351 ft)
- Lowest elevation: 29 m (95 ft)
- Population (2023): 372
  - Density: 42.4/km^{2} (110/sq mi)
- Time zone: UTC+01:00 (CET)
  - Summer (DST): UTC+02:00 (CEST)
- INSEE/Postal code: 37076 /37500
- ^{1} French Land Register data, which excludes lakes, ponds, glaciers > 1 km^{2} (0.386 sq mi or 247 acres) and river estuaries.

Cinais (French pronunciation: [sinɛ]) is a commune in the Indre-et-Loire department in central France.

== Population ==
Historical population
Year	Pop.	±% p.a.
1968	315	—
1975	292	−1.08%
1982	405	+4.78%
1990	430	+0.75%
1999	438	+0.21%
2007	433	−0.14%
2012	444	+0.50%
2017	423	−0.96%
2023	372	−2.12%
Source: INSEE

== See also ==
- Communes of the Indre-et-Loire department
