= Thizay, Indre-et-Loire =

Thizay
- Commune
- Location of Thizay
- Location within France Location within Centre-Val de Loire
- Coordinates: 47°10′02″N 0°08′38″E
- Country: France
- Region: Centre-Val de Loire
- Department: Indre-et-Loire
- Arrondissement: Chinon
- Canton: Chinon

Government
  - Mayor (2021–2026): Eric Bidet
- Area^{1}: 6.92 km^{2} (2.67 sq mi)
- Highest elevation: 100 m (330 ft)
- Lowest elevation: 27 m (89 ft)
- Population (2023): 307
  - Density: 44.4/km^{2} (115/sq mi)
- Time zone: UTC+01:00 (CET)
  - Summer (DST): UTC+02:00 (CEST)
- INSEE/Postal code: 37258 /37500
- ^{1} French Land Register data, which excludes lakes, ponds, glaciers > 1 km^{2} (0.386 sq mi or 247 acres) and river estuaries.

Thizay (French pronunciation: [tizɛ]) is a commune in the Indre-et-Loire department in central France.

== Population ==
Historical population
Year	Pop.	±% p.a.
1968	181	—
1975	156	−2.10%
1982	203	+3.83%
1990	218	+0.90%
1999	233	+0.74%
2007	265	+1.62%
2012	283	+1.32%
2017	281	−0.14%
2023	307	+1.49%
Source: INSEE

== See also ==
- Communes of the Indre-et-Loire department
