= Savigny-en-Véron =

- Commune
- Coat of arms
- Location of Savigny-en-Véron
- Location within France Location within Centre-Val de Loire
- Coordinates: 47°12′08″N 0°08′44″E
- Country: France
- Region: Centre-Val de Loire
- Department: Indre-et-Loire
- Arrondissement: Chinon
- Canton: Chinon

Government
  - Mayor (2020–2026): Geneviève Haillot-Ensarguet
- Area^{1}: 21.31 km^{2} (8.23 sq mi)
- Highest elevation: 43 m (141 ft)
- Lowest elevation: 27 m (89 ft)
- Population (2023): 1,541
  - Density: 72.31/km^{2} (187.3/sq mi)
- Time zone: UTC+01:00 (CET)
  - Summer (DST): UTC+02:00 (CEST)
- INSEE/Postal code: 37242 /37420
- ^{1} French Land Register data, which excludes lakes, ponds, glaciers > 1 km^{2} (0.386 sq mi or 247 acres) and river estuaries.

Savigny-en-Véron (French pronunciation: [saviɲi ɑ̃ veʁɔ̃]) is a commune in the Indre-et-Loire department in central France.

== Population ==
Historical population
Year	Pop.	±% p.a.
1968	1,055	—
1975	1,005	−0.69%
1982	1,257	+3.25%
1990	1,400	+1.36%
1999	1,272	−1.06%
2007	1,431	+1.48%
2012	1,481	+0.69%
2017	1,542	+0.81%
2023	1,541	−0.01%
Source: INSEE

== See also ==
- Communes of the Indre-et-Loire department
