= Saint-Étienne-de-Chigny =

- Commune
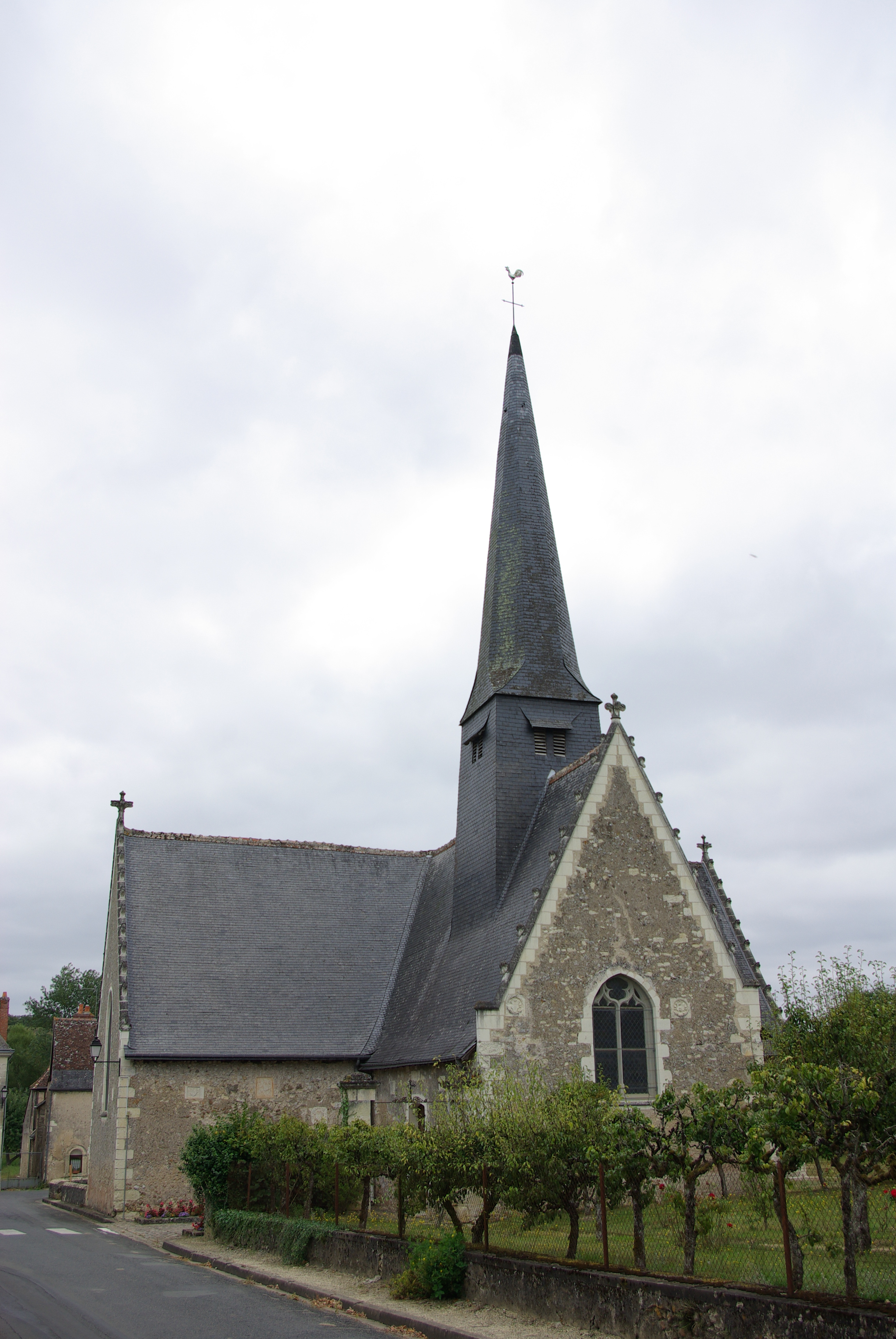
- The church of Saint-Étienne, in Saint-Étienne-de-Chigny

- Coat of arms
- Location of Saint-Étienne-de-Chigny
- Location within France Location within Centre-Val de Loire
- Coordinates: 47°22′15″N 0°31′01″E
- Country: France
- Region: Centre-Val de Loire
- Department: Indre-et-Loire
- Arrondissement: Tours
- Canton: Saint-Cyr-sur-Loire
- Intercommunality: Tours Métropole Val de Loire

Government
  - Mayor (2020–2026): Régis Salic
- Area^{1}: 21.11 km^{2} (8.15 sq mi)
- Highest elevation: 108 m (354 ft)
- Lowest elevation: 37 m (121 ft)
- Population (2023): 1,579
  - Density: 74.80/km^{2} (193.7/sq mi)
- Time zone: UTC+01:00 (CET)
  - Summer (DST): UTC+02:00 (CEST)
- INSEE/Postal code: 37217 /37230
- ^{1} French Land Register data, which excludes lakes, ponds, glaciers > 1 km^{2} (0.386 sq mi or 247 acres) and river estuaries.

Saint-Étienne-de-Chigny (French pronunciation: [sɛ̃.t‿etjɛn də ʃiɲi]) is a commune in the Indre-et-Loire department in central France.

== Population ==
Historical population
Year	Pop.	±% p.a.
1968	692	—
1975	607	−1.85%
1982	846	+4.86%
1990	1,164	+4.07%
1999	1,321	+1.42%
2007	1,364	+0.40%
2012	1,442	+1.12%
2017	1,606	+2.18%
2023	1,579	−0.28%
Source: INSEE

== See also ==
- Communes of the Indre-et-Loire department
