= Vallères =

- Commune
- Coat of arms
- Location of Vallères
- Location within France Location within Centre-Val de Loire
- Coordinates: 47°18′45″N 0°28′29″E
- Country: France
- Region: Centre-Val de Loire
- Department: Indre-et-Loire
- Arrondissement: Tours
- Canton: Chinon

Government
  - Mayor (2020–2026): Jean-Luc Cadiou
- Area^{1}: 14.72 km^{2} (5.68 sq mi)
- Highest elevation: 97 m (318 ft)
- Lowest elevation: 37 m (121 ft)
- Population (2023): 1,345
  - Density: 91.37/km^{2} (236.7/sq mi)
- Time zone: UTC+01:00 (CET)
  - Summer (DST): UTC+02:00 (CEST)
- INSEE/Postal code: 37264 /37190
- ^{1} French Land Register data, which excludes lakes, ponds, glaciers > 1 km^{2} (0.386 sq mi or 247 acres) and river estuaries.

Vallères (French pronunciation: [valɛʁ]) is a commune in the Indre-et-Loire department in central France.

== Population ==
Historical population
Year	Pop.	±% p.a.
1968	591	—
1975	560	−0.77%
1982	624	+1.56%
1990	699	+1.43%
1999	779	+1.21%
2007	1,016	+3.38%
2012	1,126	+2.08%
2017	1,244	+2.01%
2023	1,345	+1.31%
Source: INSEE

== See also ==
- Communes of the Indre-et-Loire department
