= Véretz =

- Commune
- Coat of arms
- Location of Véretz
- Location within France Location within Centre-Val de Loire
- Coordinates: 47°21′38″N 0°48′23″E
- Country: France
- Region: Centre-Val de Loire
- Department: Indre-et-Loire
- Arrondissement: Tours
- Canton: Montlouis-sur-Loire

Government
  - Mayor (2020–2026): Gilles Augereau
- Area^{1}: 13.86 km^{2} (5.35 sq mi)
- Highest elevation: 94 m (308 ft)
- Lowest elevation: 47 m (154 ft)
- Population (2023): 4,644
  - Density: 335.1/km^{2} (867.8/sq mi)
- Time zone: UTC+01:00 (CET)
  - Summer (DST): UTC+02:00 (CEST)
- INSEE/Postal code: 37267 /37270
- ^{1} French Land Register data, which excludes lakes, ponds, glaciers > 1 km^{2} (0.386 sq mi or 247 acres) and river estuaries.

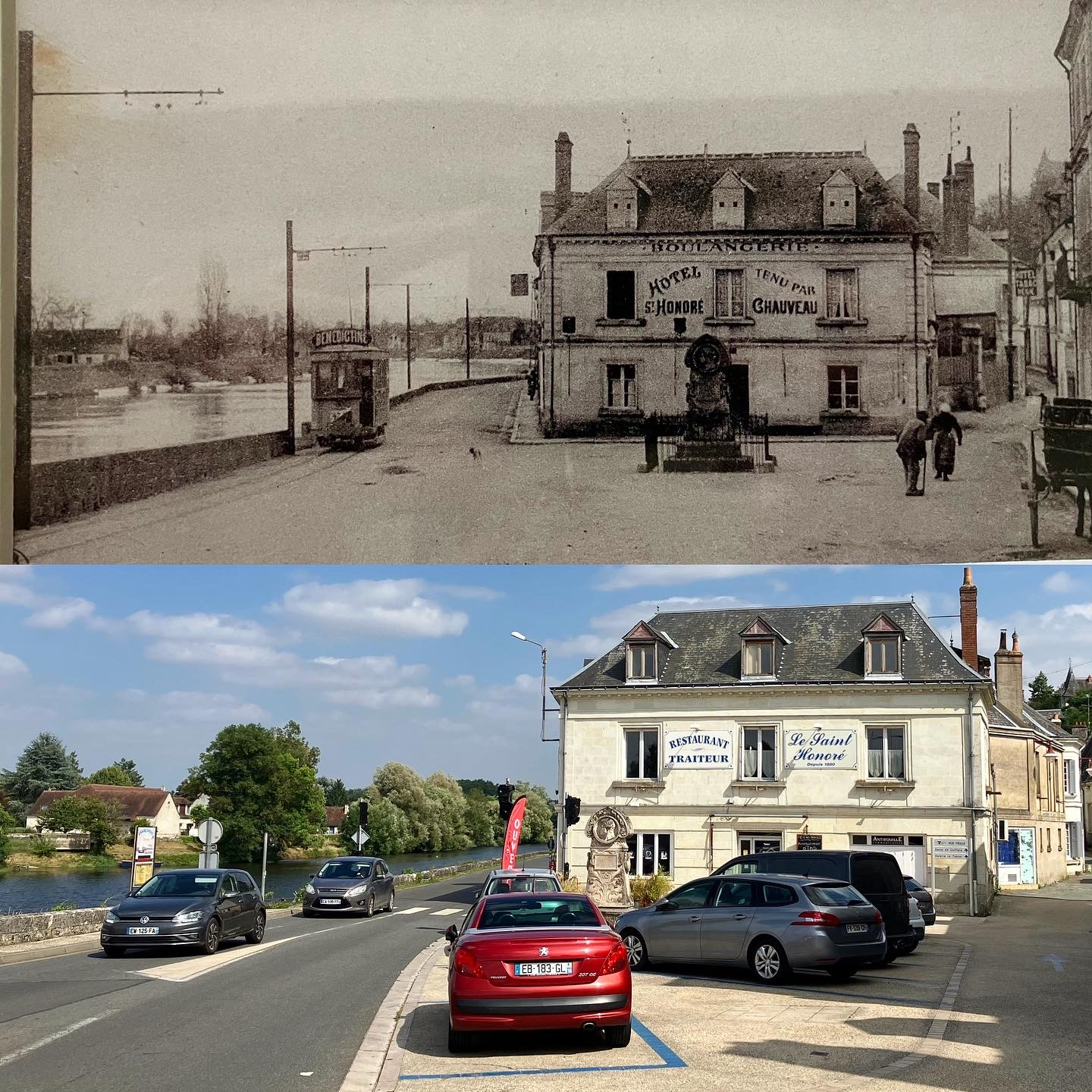
View of Veretz in 2023 next to historical image from the same point

Véretz is a commune in the Indre-et-Loire department in central France. The anarchist poet and chansonnier Eugène Bizeau (1883–1989) was born in Véretz.

== Population ==
Historical population

Year	Pop.	±% p.a.
1793	885	—
1800	876	−0.15%
1806	841	−0.68%
1821	855	+0.11%
1831	898	+0.49%
1836	966	+1.47%
1841	984	+0.37%
1846	919	−1.36%
1851	947	+0.60%
1856	923	−0.51%
1861	935	+0.26%
1866	906	−0.63%
1872	845	−1.15%
1876	869	+0.70%
1881	860	−0.21%
1886	851	−0.21%
1891	779	−1.75%
1896	787	+0.20%
1901	726	−1.60%

Year	Pop.	±% p.a.
1906	703	−0.64%
1911	713	+0.28%
1921	621	−1.37%
1926	618	−0.10%
1931	630	+0.39%
1936	620	−0.32%
1946	708	+1.34%
1954	681	−0.48%
1962	864	+3.02%
1968	1,009	+2.62%
1975	1,315	+3.86%
1982	2,313	+8.40%
1990	2,709	+2.00%
1999	3,020	+1.21%
2007	3,942	+3.39%
2012	4,303	+1.77%
2017	4,496	+0.88%
2023	4,644	+0.54%

Source: EHESS and INSEE (1968–2023)

== See also ==
- Communes of the Indre-et-Loire department
