= La Chapelle-aux-Naux =

- Commune
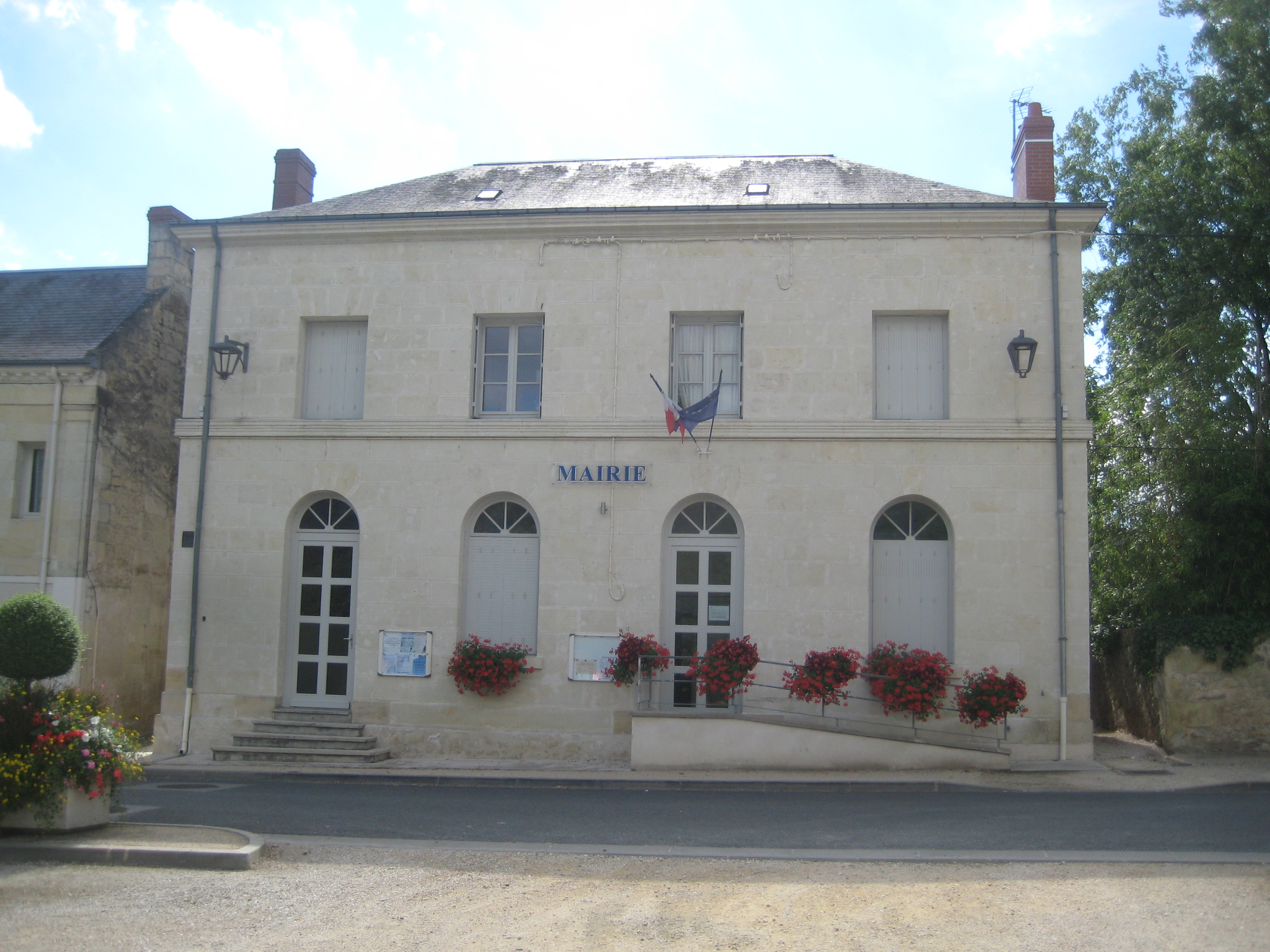
- The town hall in La Chapelle-aux-Naux
- Location of La Chapelle-aux-Naux
- Location within France Location within Centre-Val de Loire
- Coordinates: 47°19′09″N 0°25′42″E
- Country: France
- Region: Centre-Val de Loire
- Department: Indre-et-Loire
- Arrondissement: Tours
- Canton: Chinon

Government
  - Mayor (2020–2026): Philippe Massard
- Area^{1}: 5.25 km^{2} (2.03 sq mi)
- Highest elevation: 41 m (135 ft)
- Lowest elevation: 36 m (118 ft)
- Population (2023): 562
  - Density: 107/km^{2} (277/sq mi)
- Time zone: UTC+01:00 (CET)
  - Summer (DST): UTC+02:00 (CEST)
- INSEE/Postal code: 37056 /37130
- ^{1} French Land Register data, which excludes lakes, ponds, glaciers > 1 km^{2} (0.386 sq mi or 247 acres) and river estuaries.

La Chapelle-aux-Naux (French pronunciation: [la ʃapɛl o no]) is a commune in the Indre-et-Loire department in central France.

== Population ==
Historical population
Year	Pop.	±% p.a.
1968	428	—
1975	421	−0.24%
1982	402	−0.66%
1990	458	+1.64%
1999	496	+0.89%
2007	526	+0.74%
2012	568	+1.55%
2017	571	+0.11%
2023	562	−0.26%
Source: INSEE

== See also ==
- Communes of the Indre-et-Loire department
