= Fondettes =

- Commune
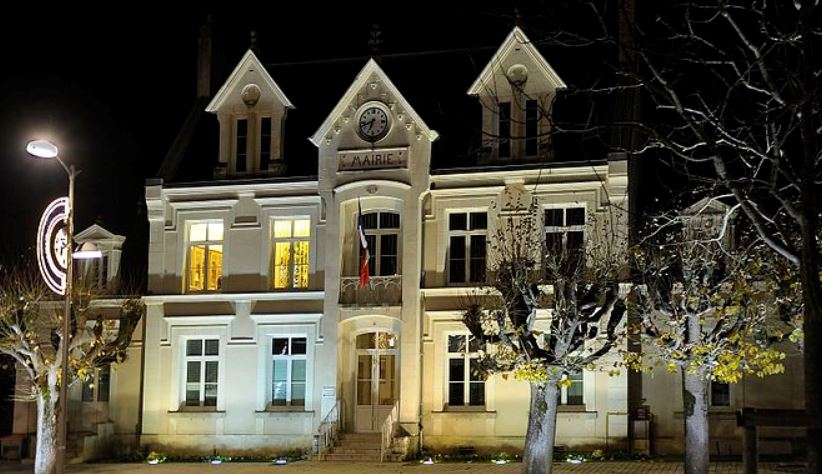
- Town hall of Fondettes

- Coat of arms
- Location of Fondettes
- Location within France Location within Centre-Val de Loire
- Coordinates: 47°24′18″N 0°35′59″E
- Country: France
- Region: Centre-Val de Loire
- Department: Indre-et-Loire
- Arrondissement: Tours
- Canton: Saint-Cyr-sur-Loire
- Intercommunality: Tours Métropole Val de Loire

Government
  - Mayor (2020–2026): Cédric de Oliveira
- Area^{1}: 32.08 km^{2} (12.39 sq mi)
- Highest elevation: 100 m (330 ft)
- Lowest elevation: 42 m (138 ft)
- Population (2023): 10,954
  - Density: 341.5/km^{2} (884.4/sq mi)
- Time zone: UTC+01:00 (CET)
  - Summer (DST): UTC+02:00 (CEST)
- INSEE/Postal code: 37109 /37230
- ^{1} French Land Register data, which excludes lakes, ponds, glaciers > 1 km^{2} (0.386 sq mi or 247 acres) and river estuaries.

Fondettes (French pronunciation: [fɔ̃dɛt]) is a commune in the suburbs of Tours in the Indre-et-Loire department in the Centre-Val de Loire region.

== Population ==
Historical population

Year	Pop.	±% p.a.
1793	1,981	—
1800	1,940	−0.30%
1806	2,501	+4.32%
1821	2,363	−0.38%
1831	2,471	+0.45%
1836	2,312	−1.32%
1841	2,423	+0.94%
1846	2,303	−1.01%
1851	2,283	−0.17%
1856	2,401	+1.01%
1861	2,247	−1.32%
1866	2,251	+0.04%
1872	2,258	+0.05%
1876	2,276	+0.20%
1881	2,300	+0.21%
1886	2,245	−0.48%
1891	2,138	−0.97%
1896	2,111	−0.25%
1901	2,071	−0.38%

Year	Pop.	±% p.a.
1906	2,087	+0.15%
1911	2,038	−0.47%
1921	2,074	+0.18%
1926	2,198	+1.17%
1931	2,195	−0.03%
1936	2,351	+1.38%
1946	2,469	+0.49%
1954	3,058	+2.71%
1962	3,182	+0.50%
1968	3,441	+1.31%
1975	4,635	+4.35%
1982	5,844	+3.37%
1990	7,325	+2.86%
1999	8,921	+2.21%
2007	9,989	+1.42%
2012	10,235	+0.49%
2017	10,307	+0.14%
2023	10,954	+1.02%

Source: EHESS and INSEE (1968–2023)

== Mayors of Fondettes ==
- 1944–1945: René Vernier
- 1945–1959: Ernest Dupuis
- 1959–1971: Marcel Chauvin
- 1971–1993: Jean Roux
- 1993–1995: Jean-Paul Leduc
- 1995–2001: Joseph Masbernat
- 2001–2008: Michel Pasquier
- 2008–2014: Gérard Garrido
- 2014– : Cédric de Oliveira

== International relations ==
Fondette is twinned with:

- Wiesbaden, Naurod, Hesse, Germany
- Constancia, Santarém (district), Portugal.

== Architectural Heritage ==
Architectural Heritage of Fondettes

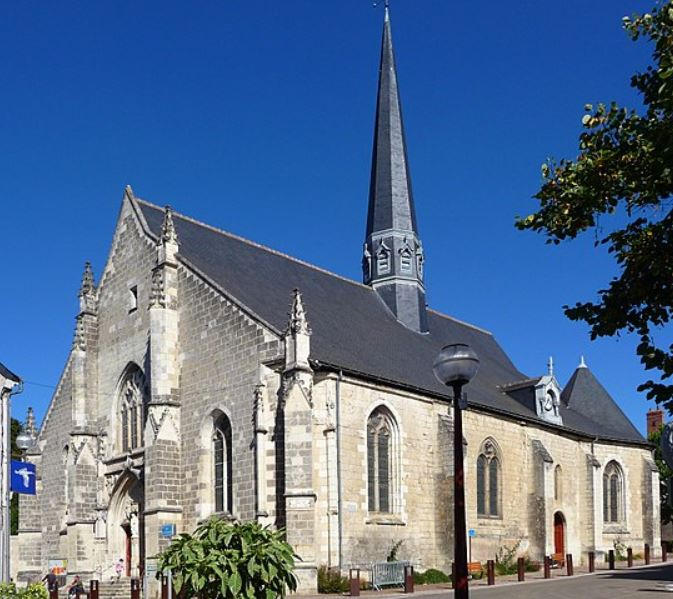
The Saint-Symphorien's church.

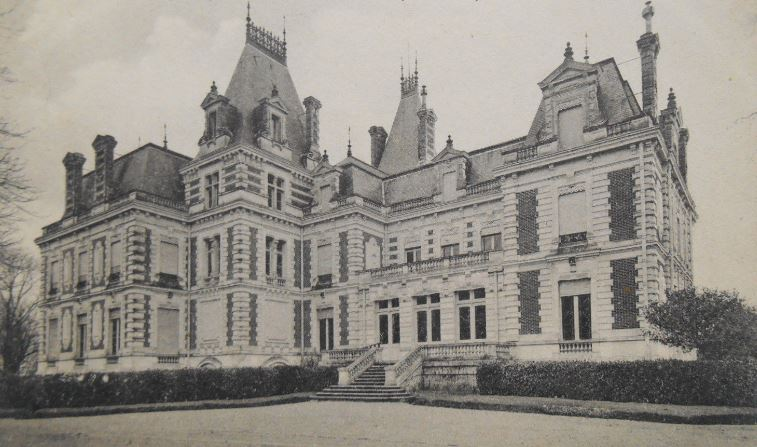
The castle of La Plaine.

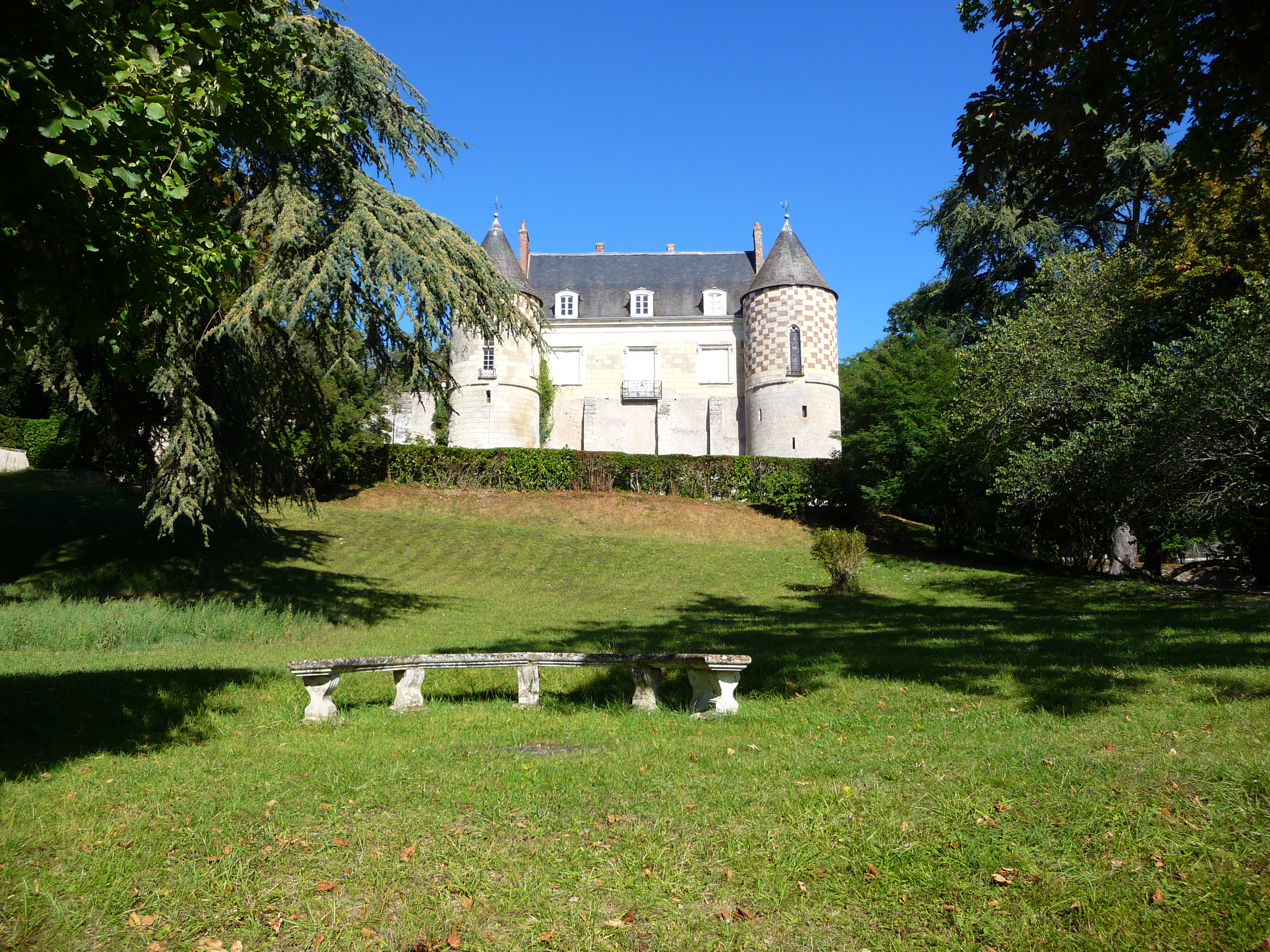
The castle of Châtigny.

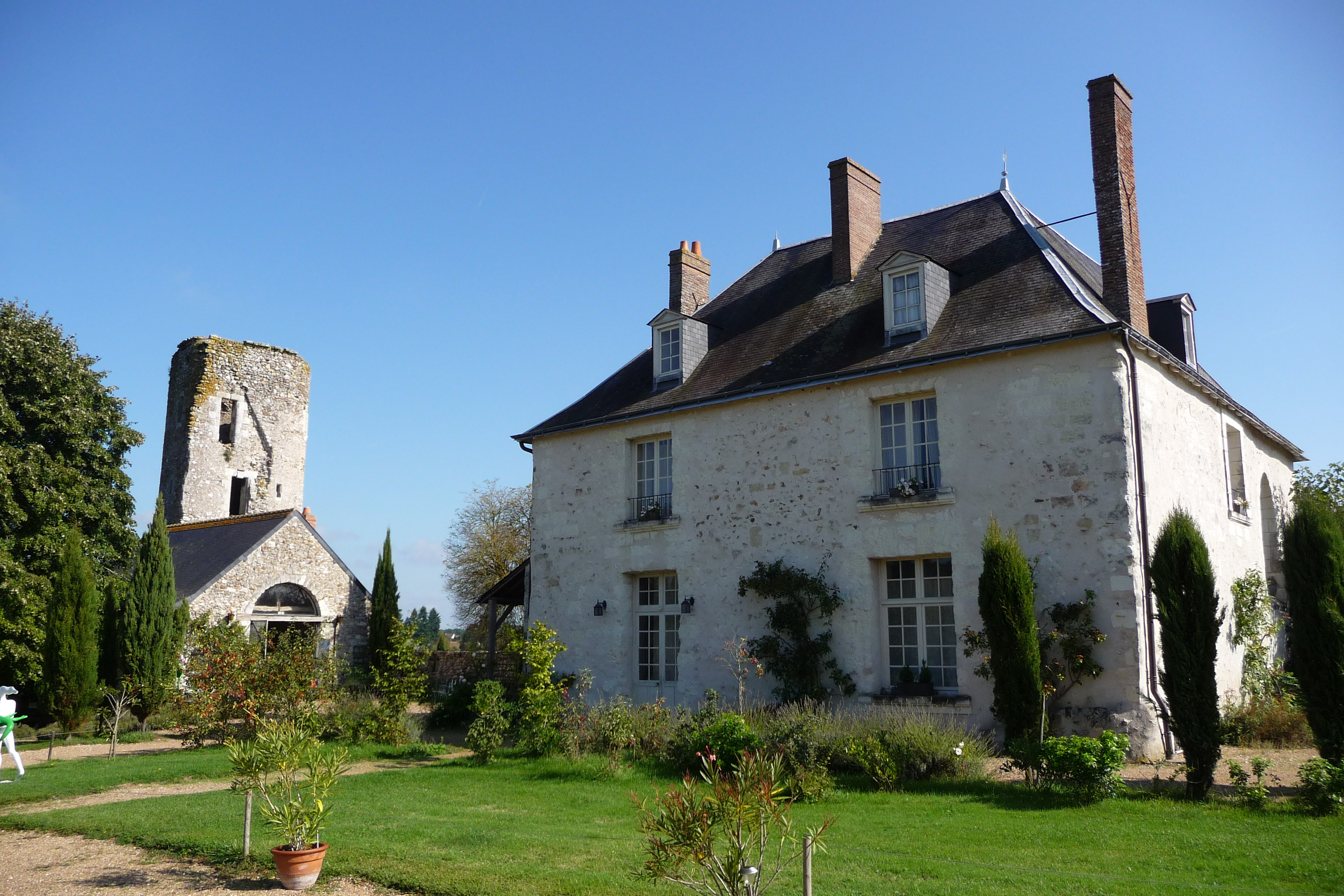
Prioral church of Lavaré.

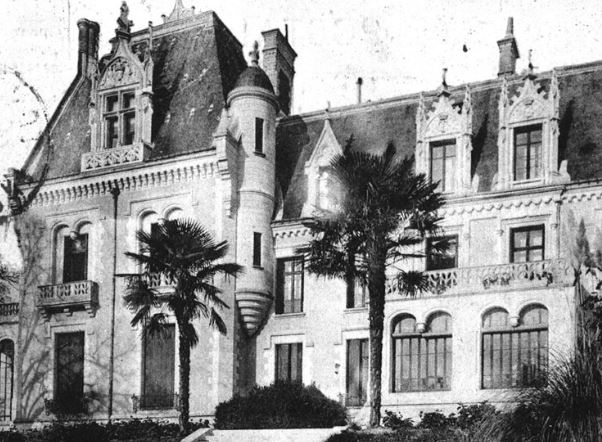
Castle of Bel-Air.

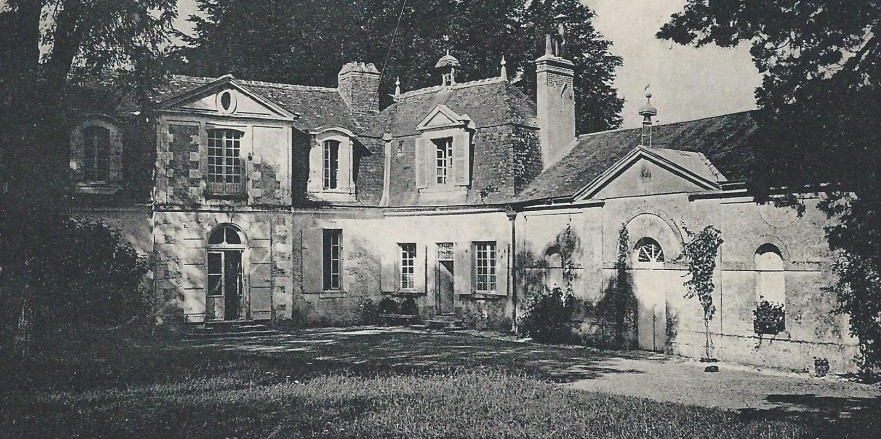
The manor of Hamardières.

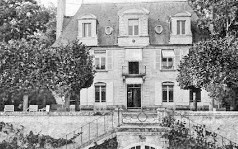
The manor of Thoudé.

== See also ==
- Communes of the Indre-et-Loire department
- Ancient bridges over the Loire in the Touraine area
