= Canton of Montlouis-sur-Loire =

Coordinates: 47.39°N 0.83°E

The canton of Montlouis-sur-Loire is an administrative division of the Indre-et-Loire department, central France. Its borders were modified at the French canton reorganisation which came into effect in March 2015. Its seat is in Montlouis-sur-Loire.

It consists of the following communes:

1. Chambray-lès-Tours
2. Larçay
3. Montlouis-sur-Loire
4. Véretz
5. La Ville-aux-Dames
