= Notre-Dame-la-Riche Church =

Coordinates: 47°23′38″N 0°40′36″E

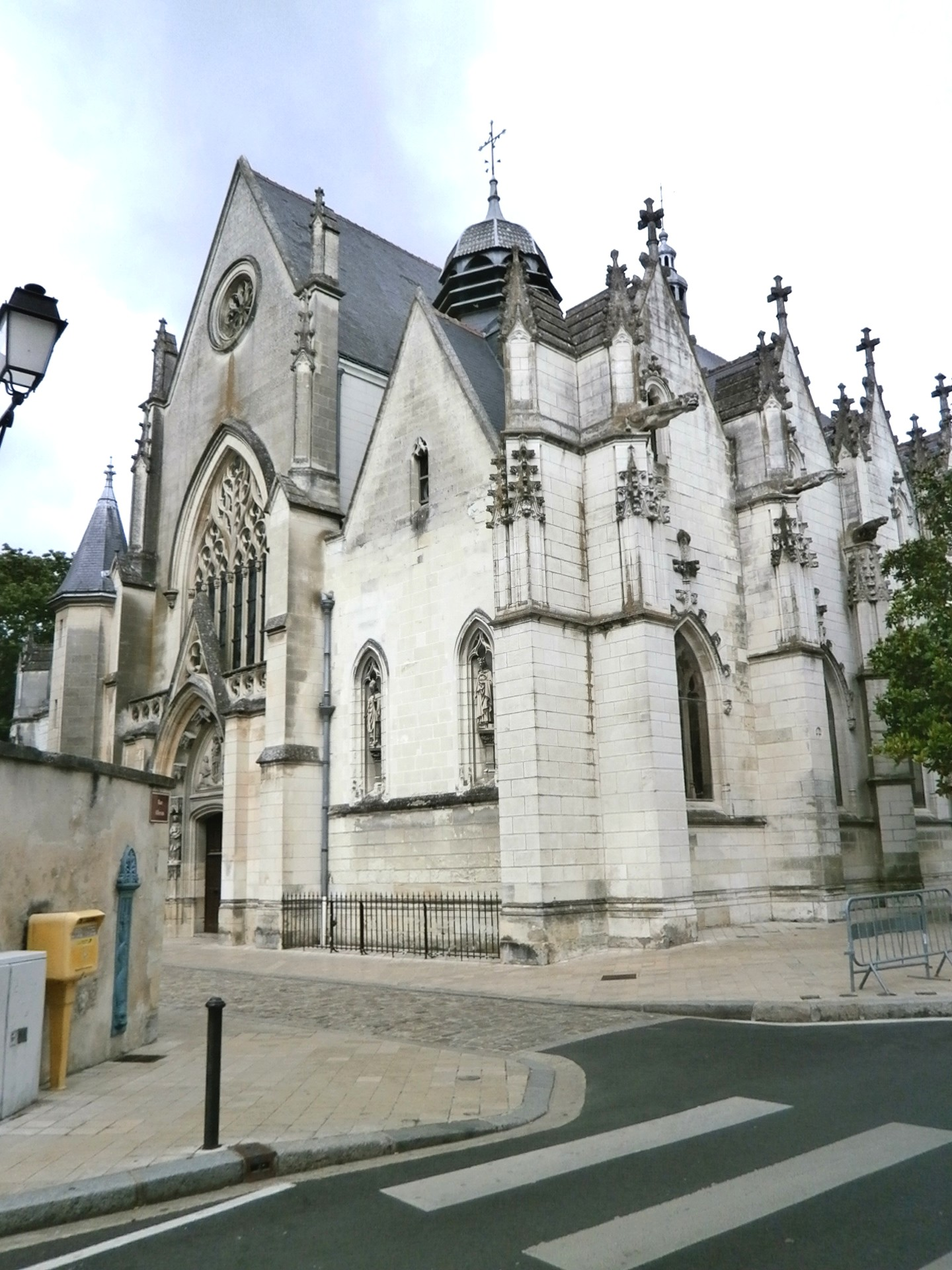

Notre-Dame-de-la-Riche Church (église Notre-Dame-la-Riche) is a Roman Catholic church building on Rue Georges-Courteline in the old town district of Tours. The town of La Riche is named after it.

== History ==
Saint Lidoire or Litorius built a church on the site of a Christian cemetery in the 4th century. A church of Notre-Dame-la-Pauvre is recorded in the 10th century on teh site of the tomb of Gatianus, saint and founding bishop of the see of Tours. Texts record a church with that dedication from 920 onwards. It was rebuilt several times and has been known under its present name since 1141. All that remains of the church of that time is the crypt dedicated to Gatianus, situated outside the plan of the present-day church.

The present building was rebuilt in the 15th century on a smaller scale than the church which preceded it. The Huguenots sacked it in 1562, damaging the nave and side-chapels. Restoration work occurred before 1570. The wooden rood screen was replaced by an iron grille in 1746 and the pillar known as "de la Riche", surviving from the Romanesque building, was torn down in 1775. During the French Revolution the building was used to make saltpeter, before being returned to religious use in 1798 and restored in 1818-1820.

Another restoration was carried out in 1860-1866 by Gustave Guérin (1814-1881). He raised the vaults and covered them in brick. The old exposed timber vaulting was reused for the new roof and the side-chapels and west and south doors were rebuilt. The building was made a monument historique on 30 March 1926.

Exterior

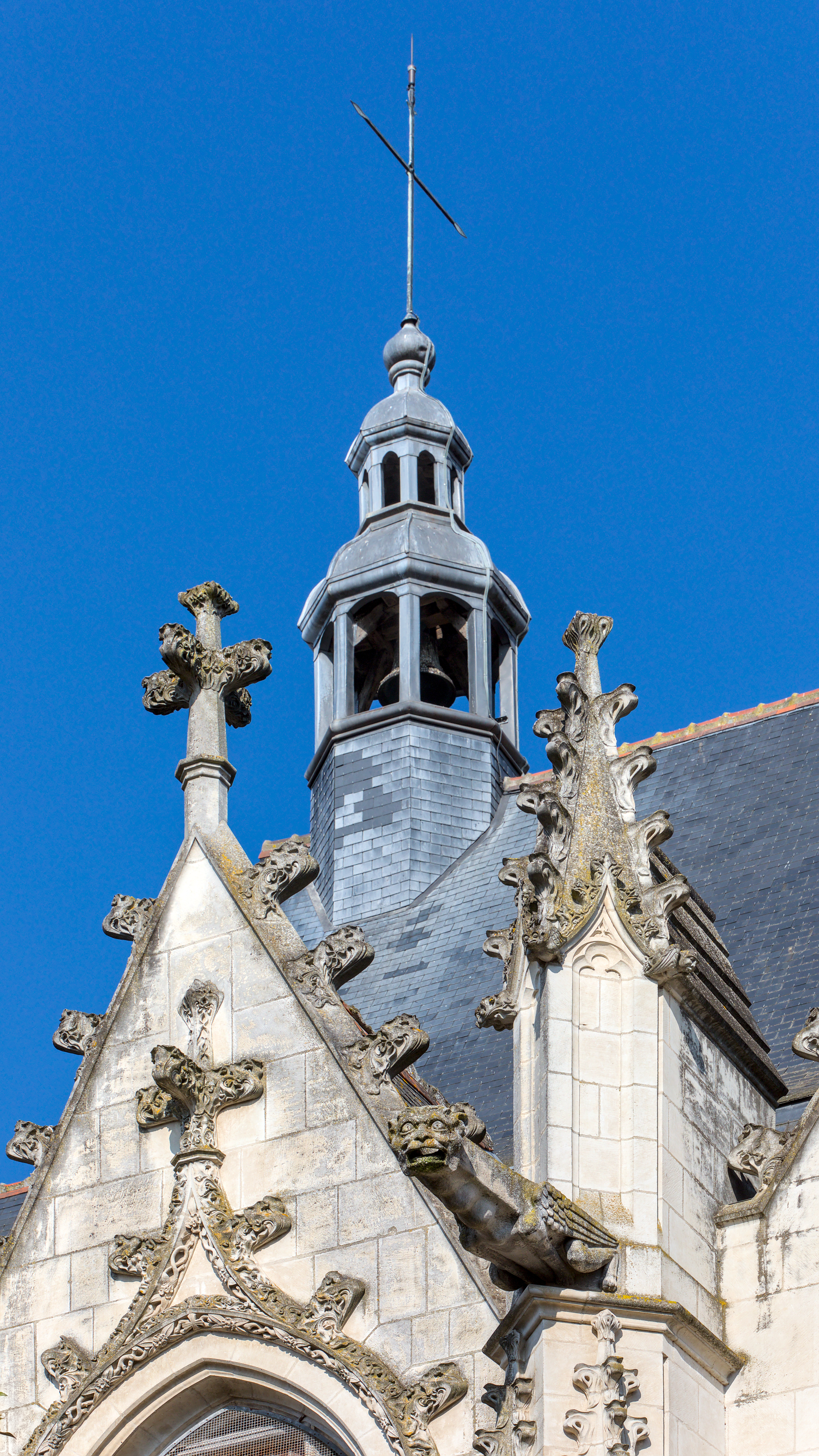
Tower, pinnacles and gargyles

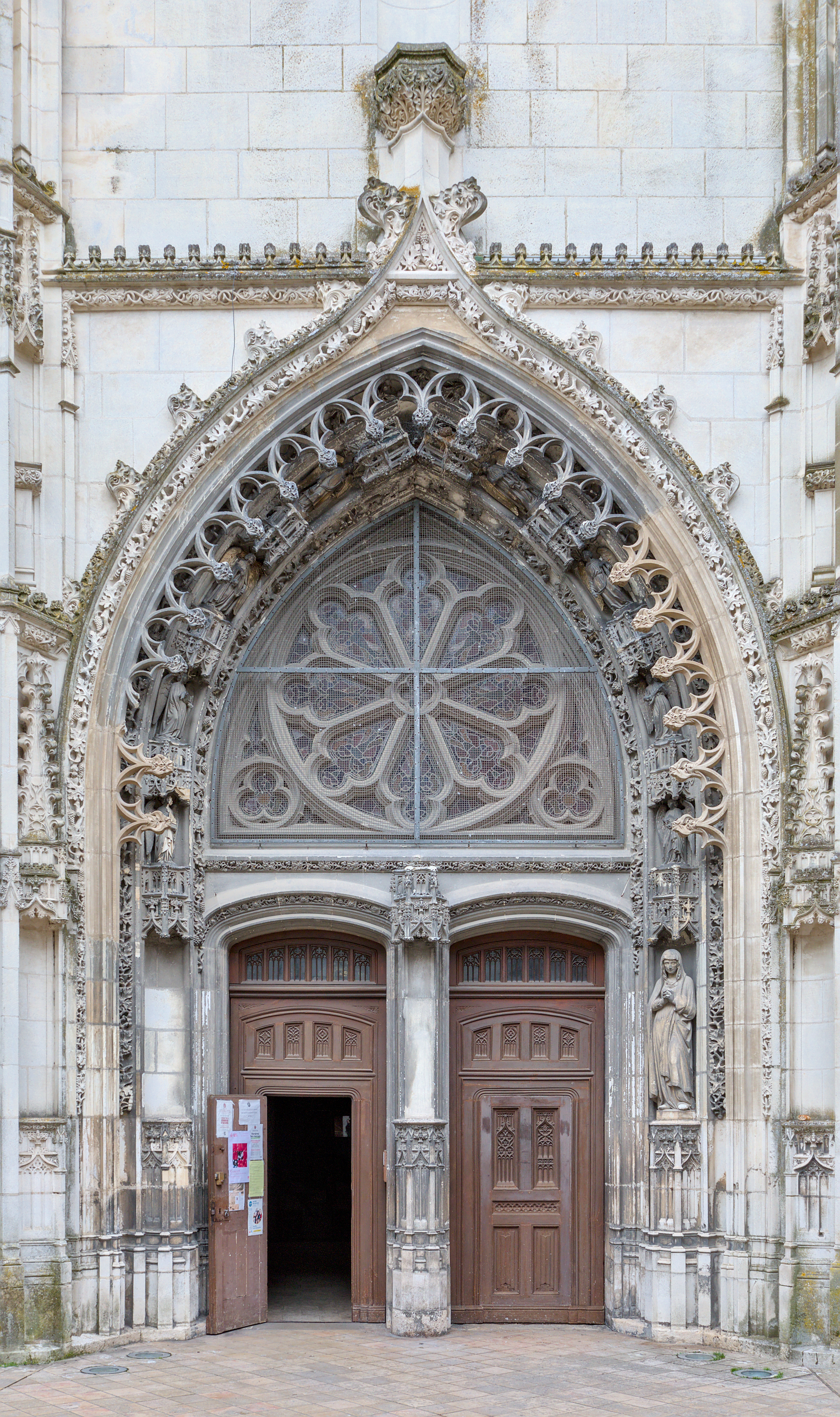
South door

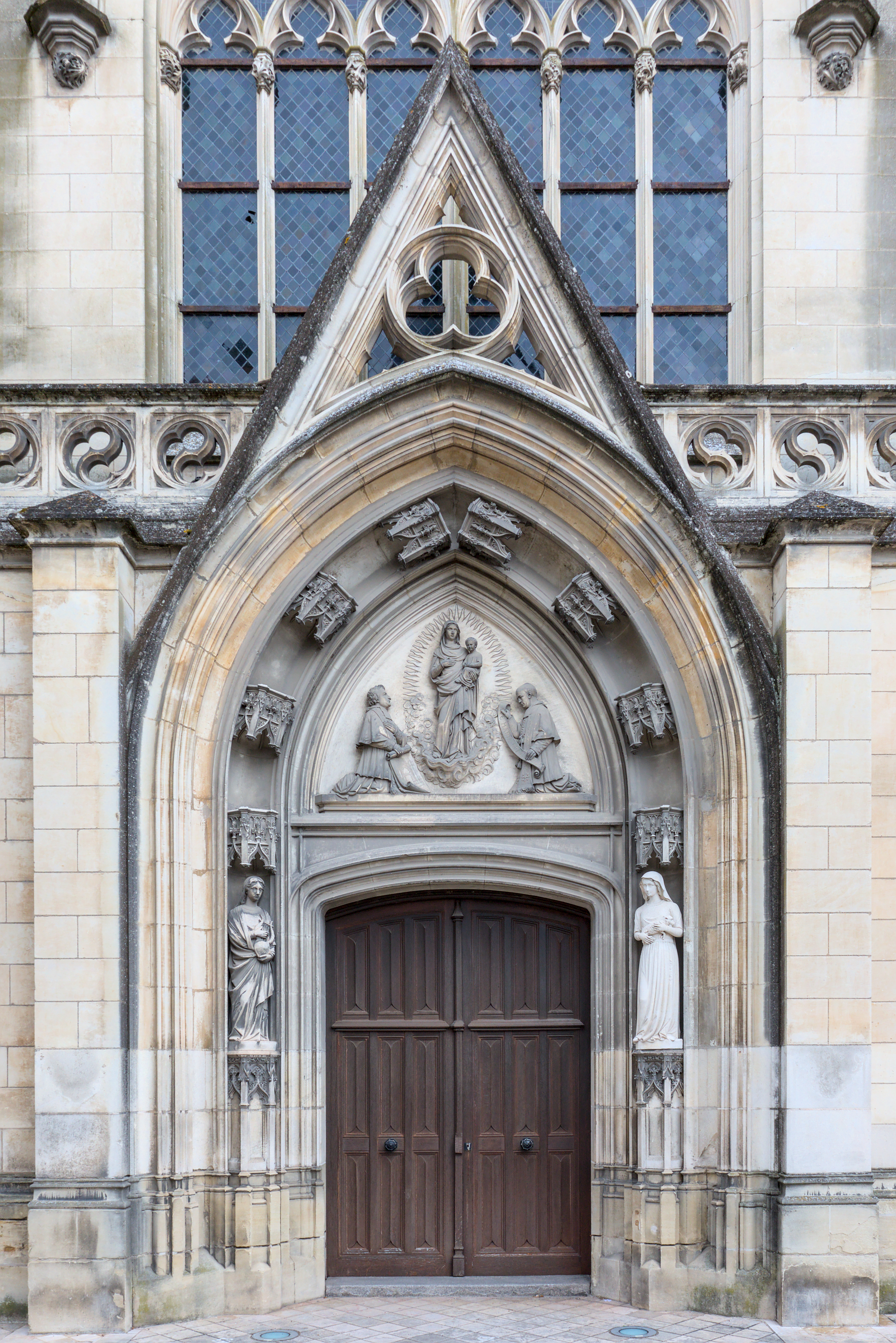
West door

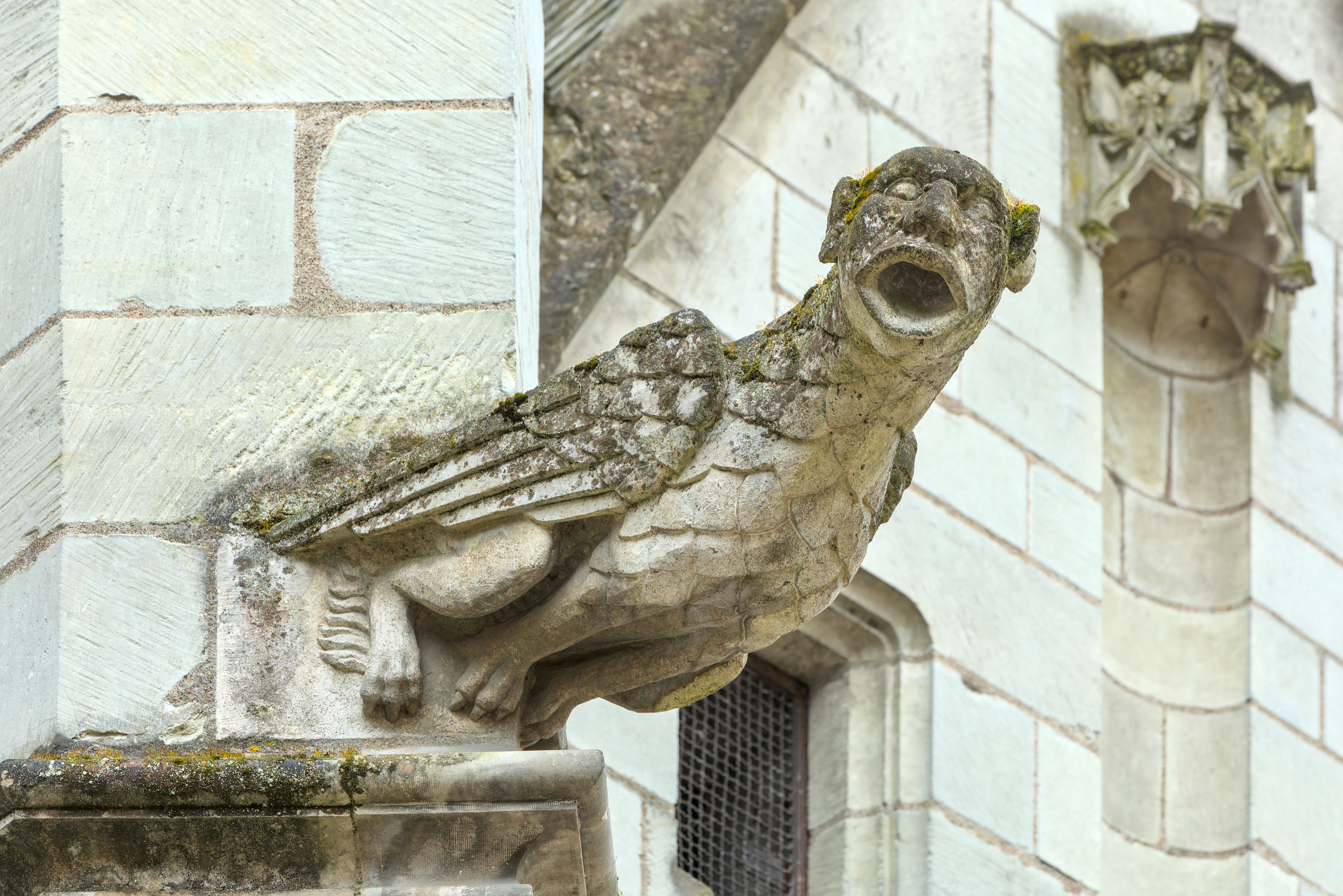
Gargoyle on the north façade

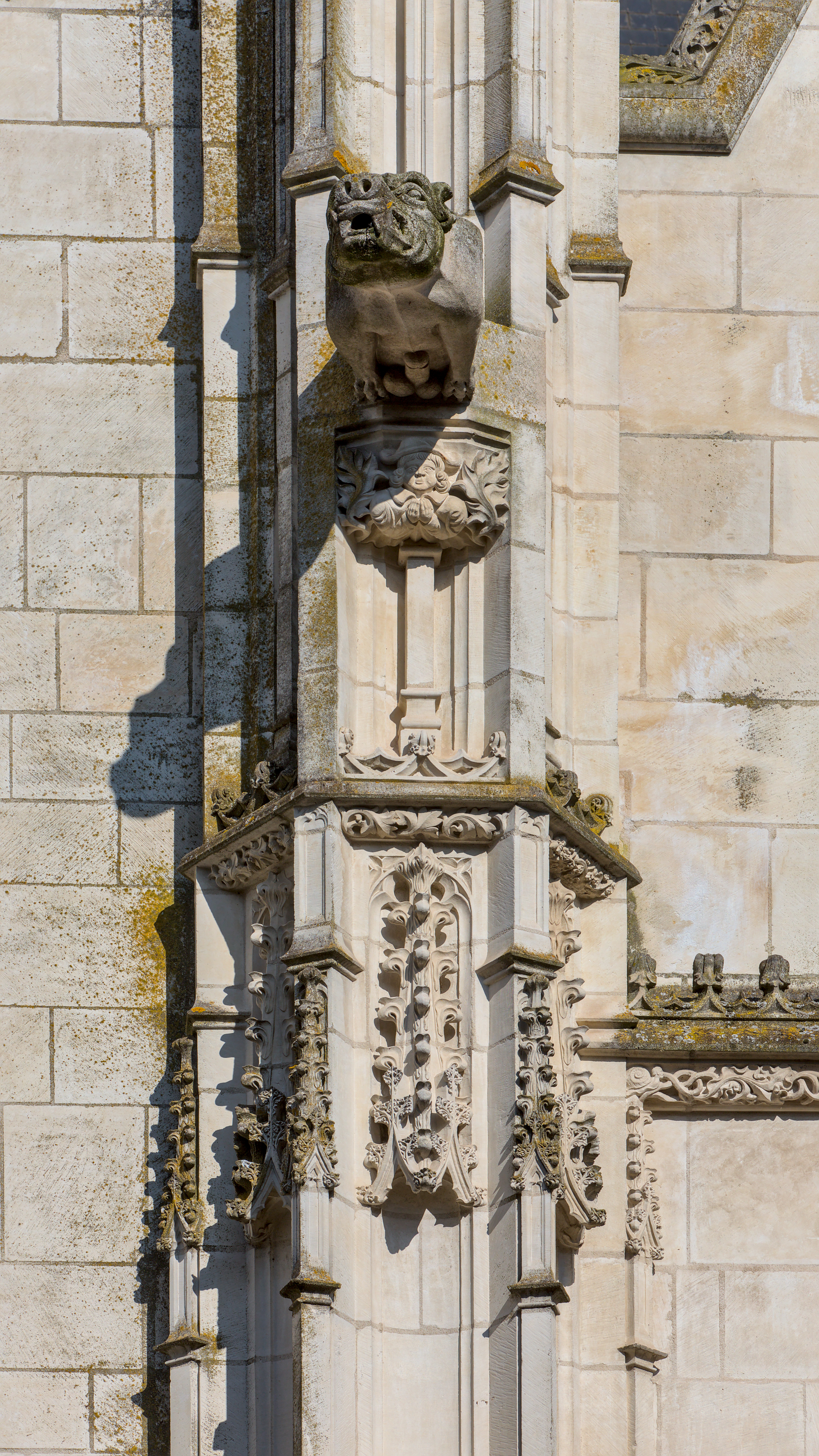
Gargoyle and sculpted motifs on the south façade

== Decoration ==
It has a group of five 17th-century statues representing the marriage of the Virgin Mary, specifically saint Joseph, Mary, the High Priest and Mary's parents Anne and Joachim. They were created by Antoine Charpentier, a sculptor born in Tours, for the Minim monastery near the château de Plessis-lès-Tours.

It also has several sixteenth-century stained glass windows and relics of Francis of Paola exposed in a reliquary on the north side wall.

Decoration

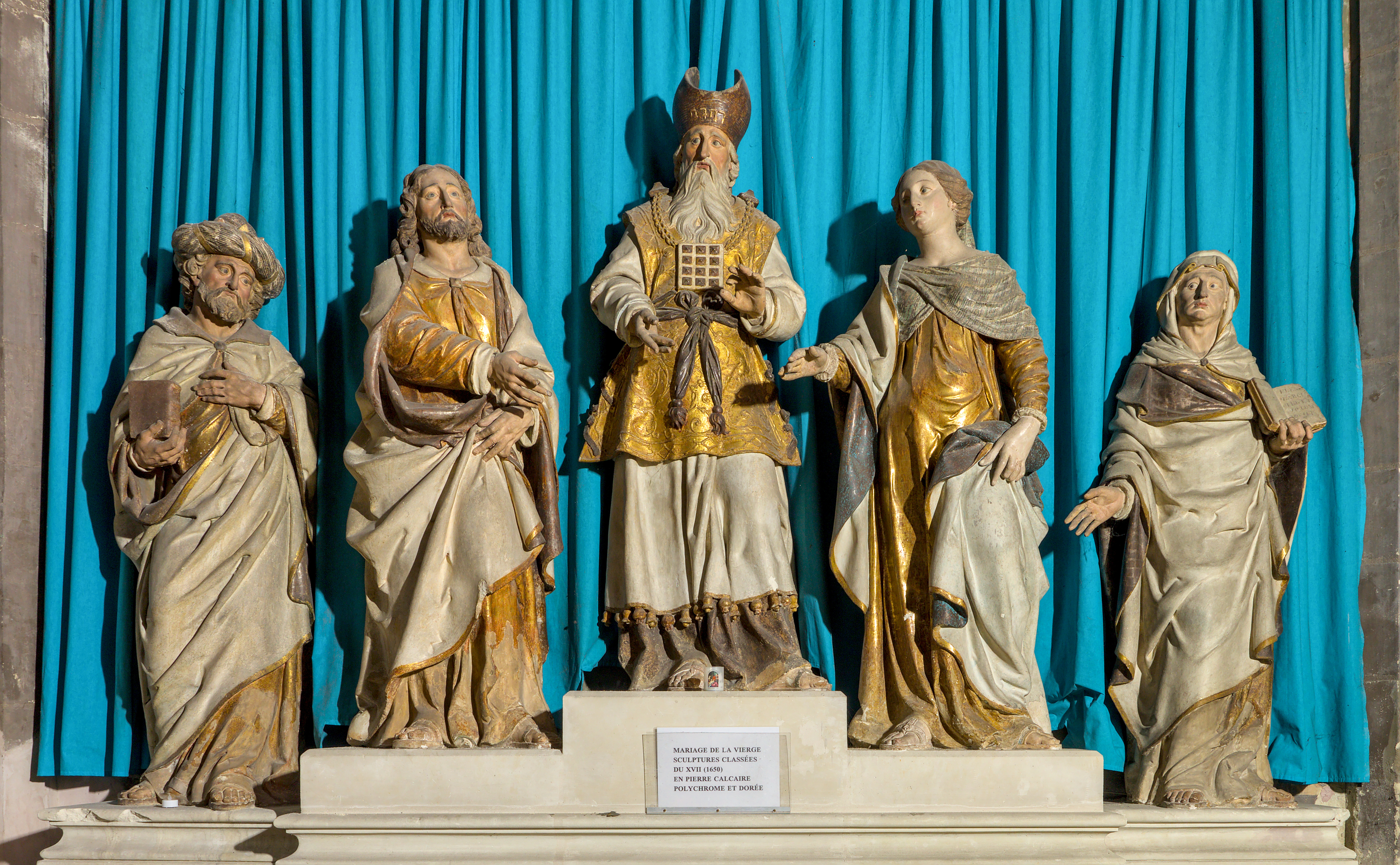
Marriage of the Virgin, wood, 1650, by Antoine Charpentier

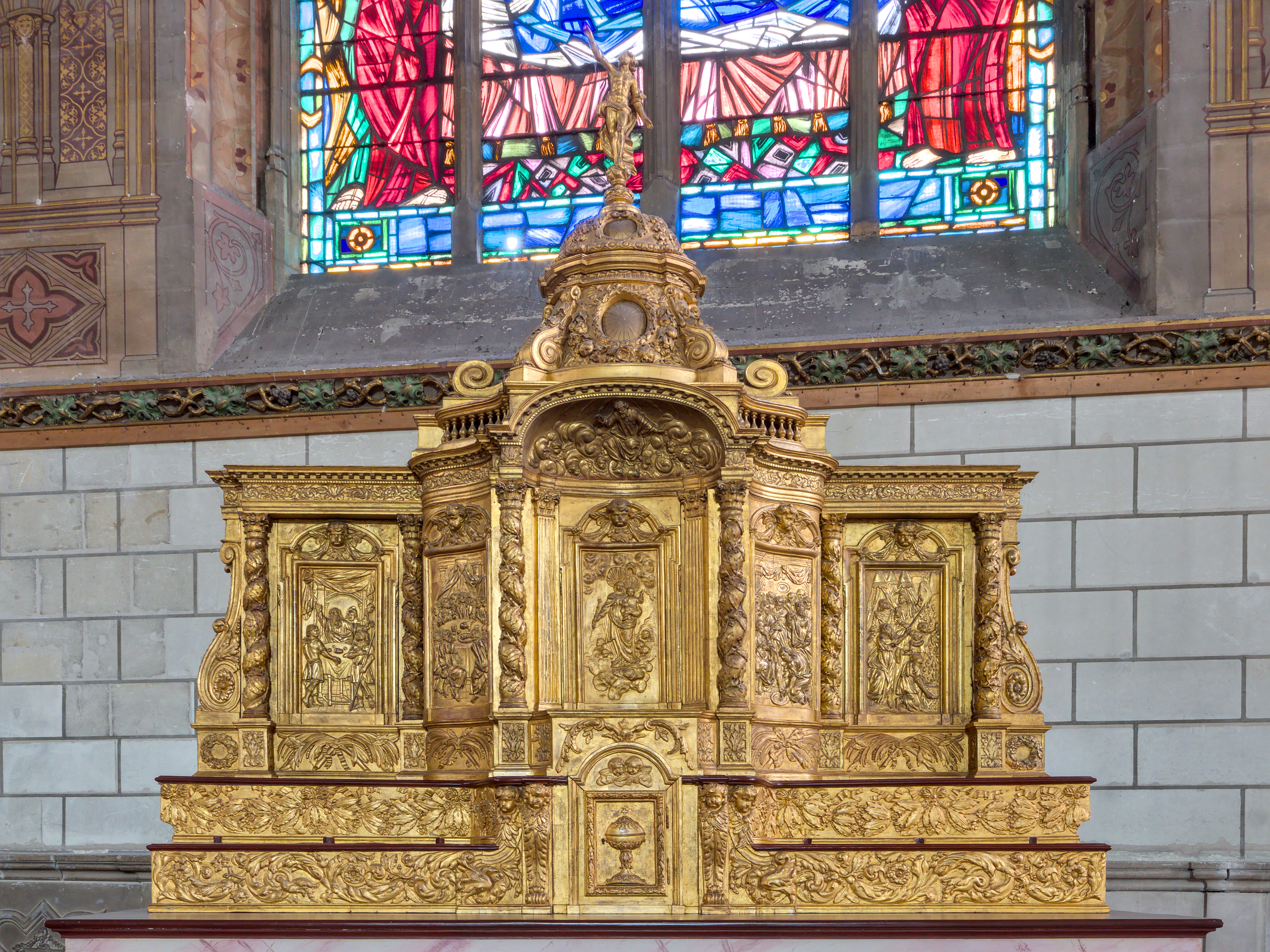
Gilded tabernacle, 17th c.

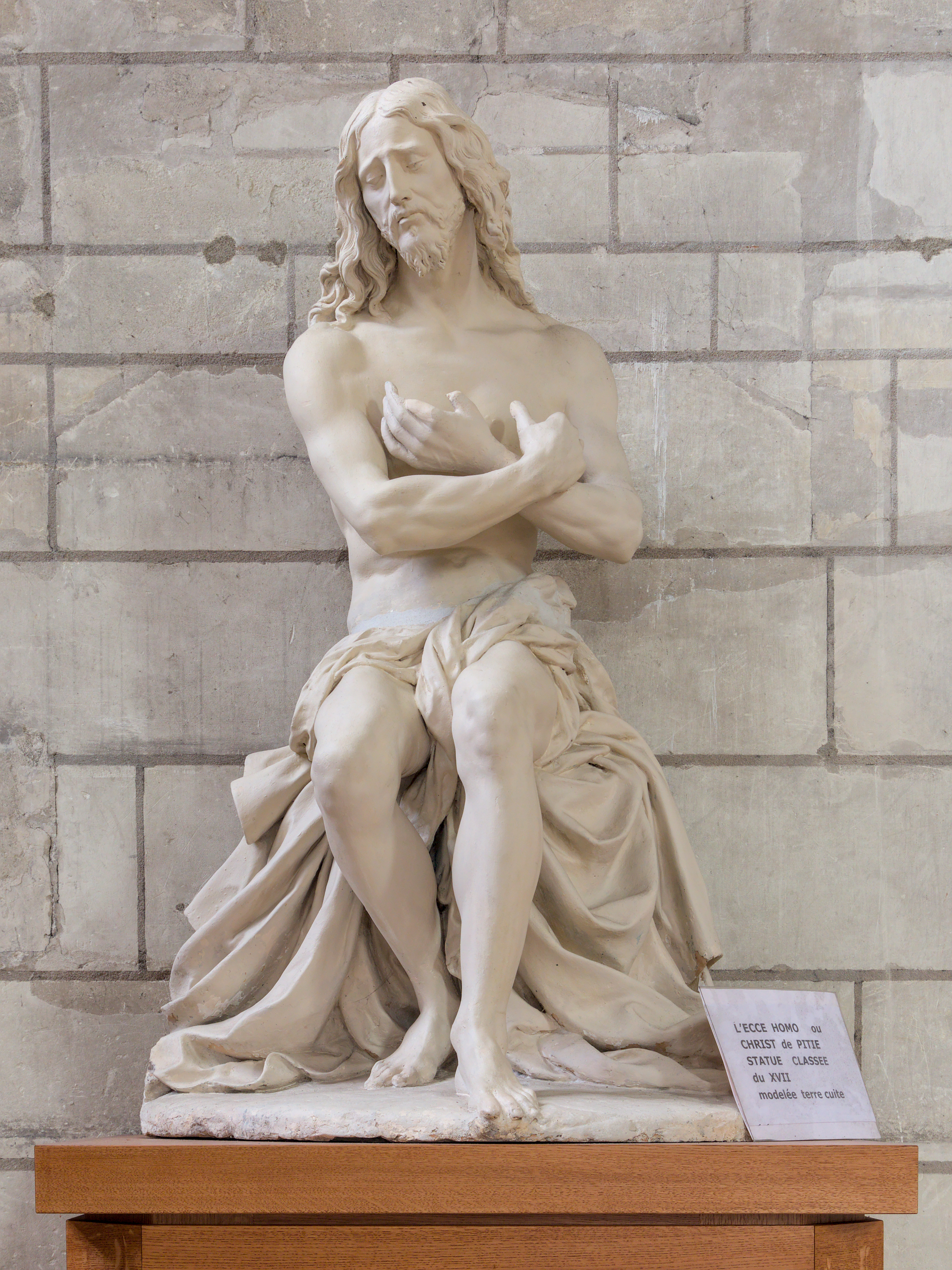
Ecce Homo, 17th c.

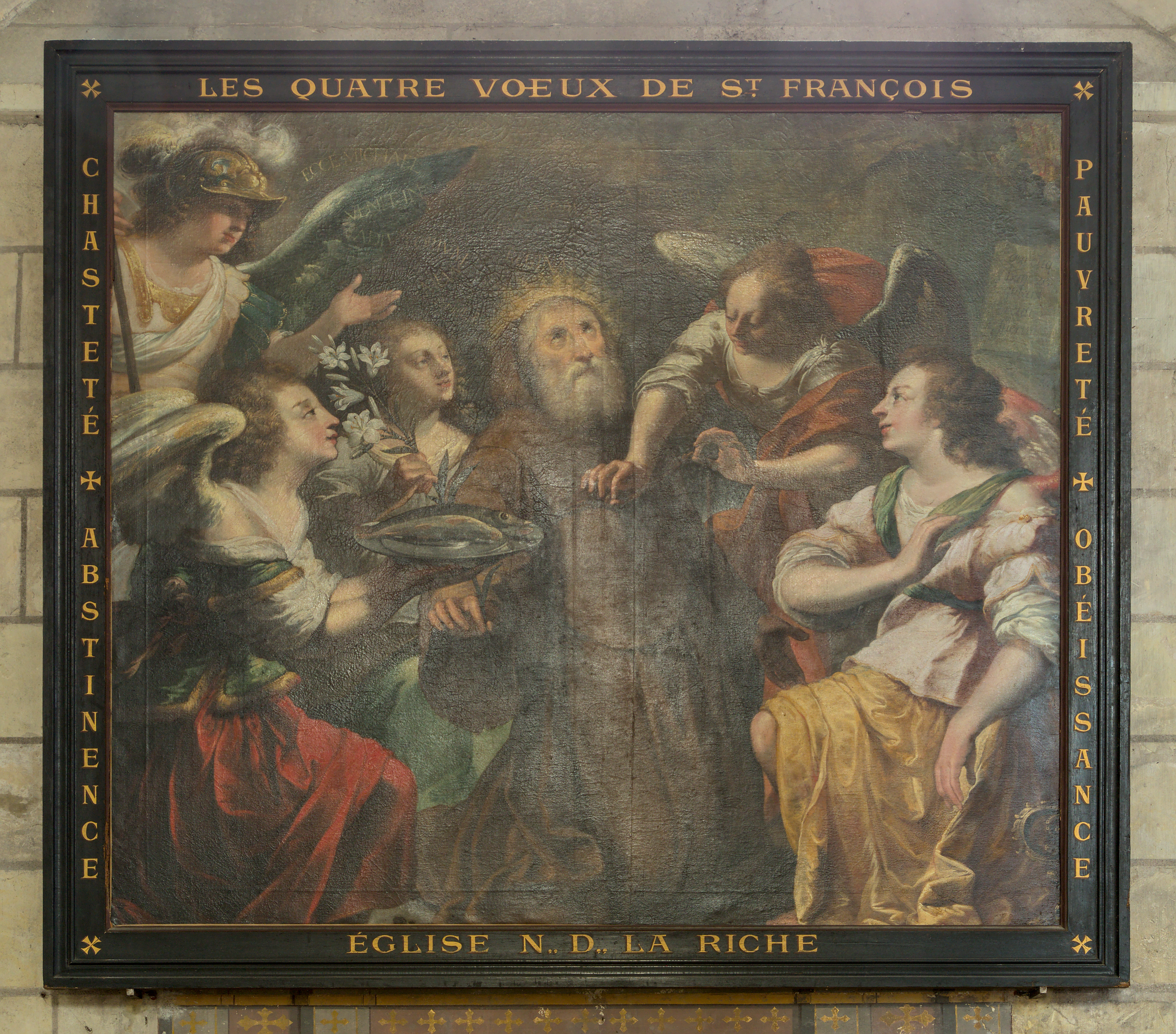
The Four Vows of St Francis of Paola, by Jérémie le Pileur

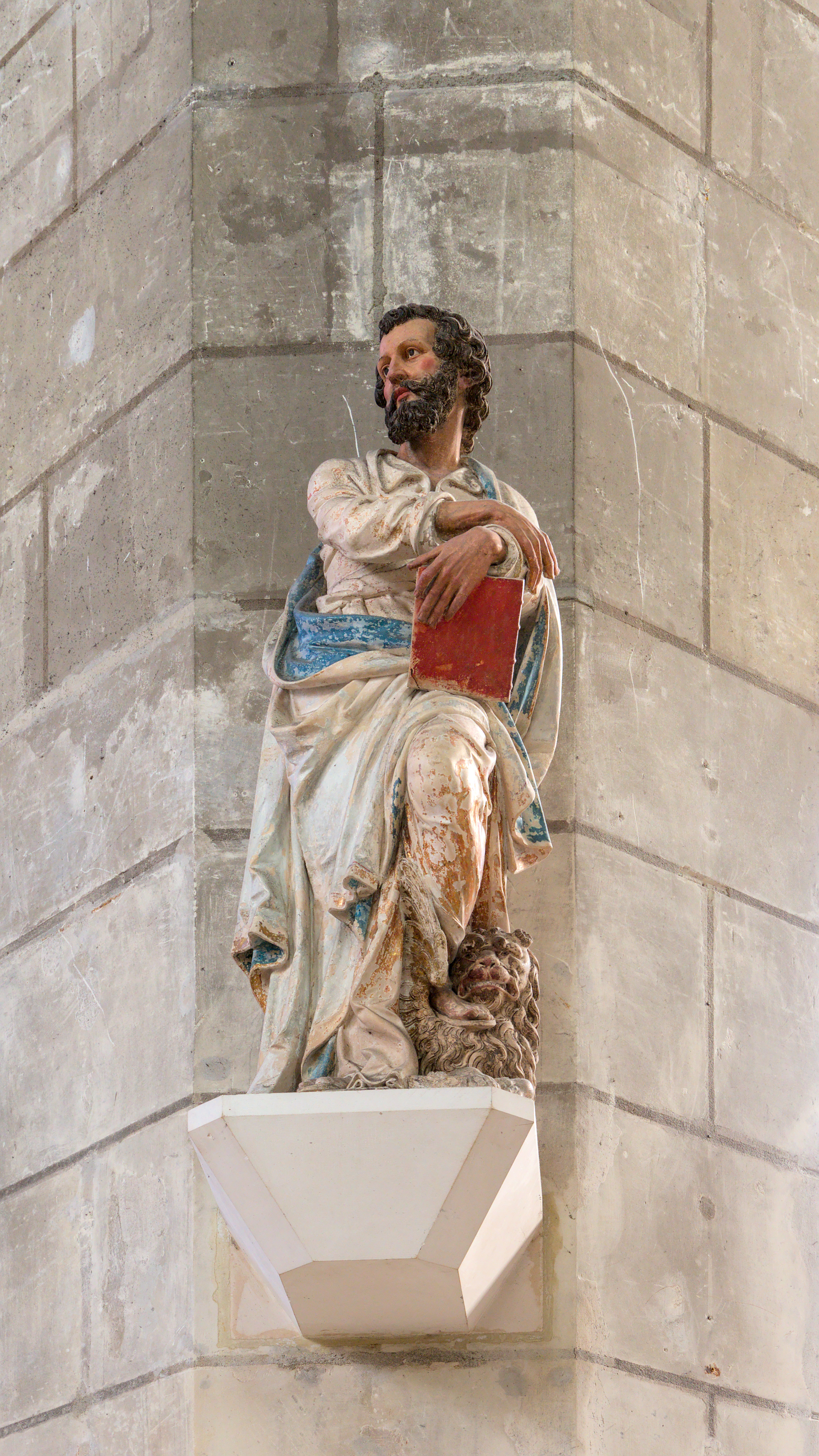
St Mark by Charles Hoyau, 17th c., terracotta

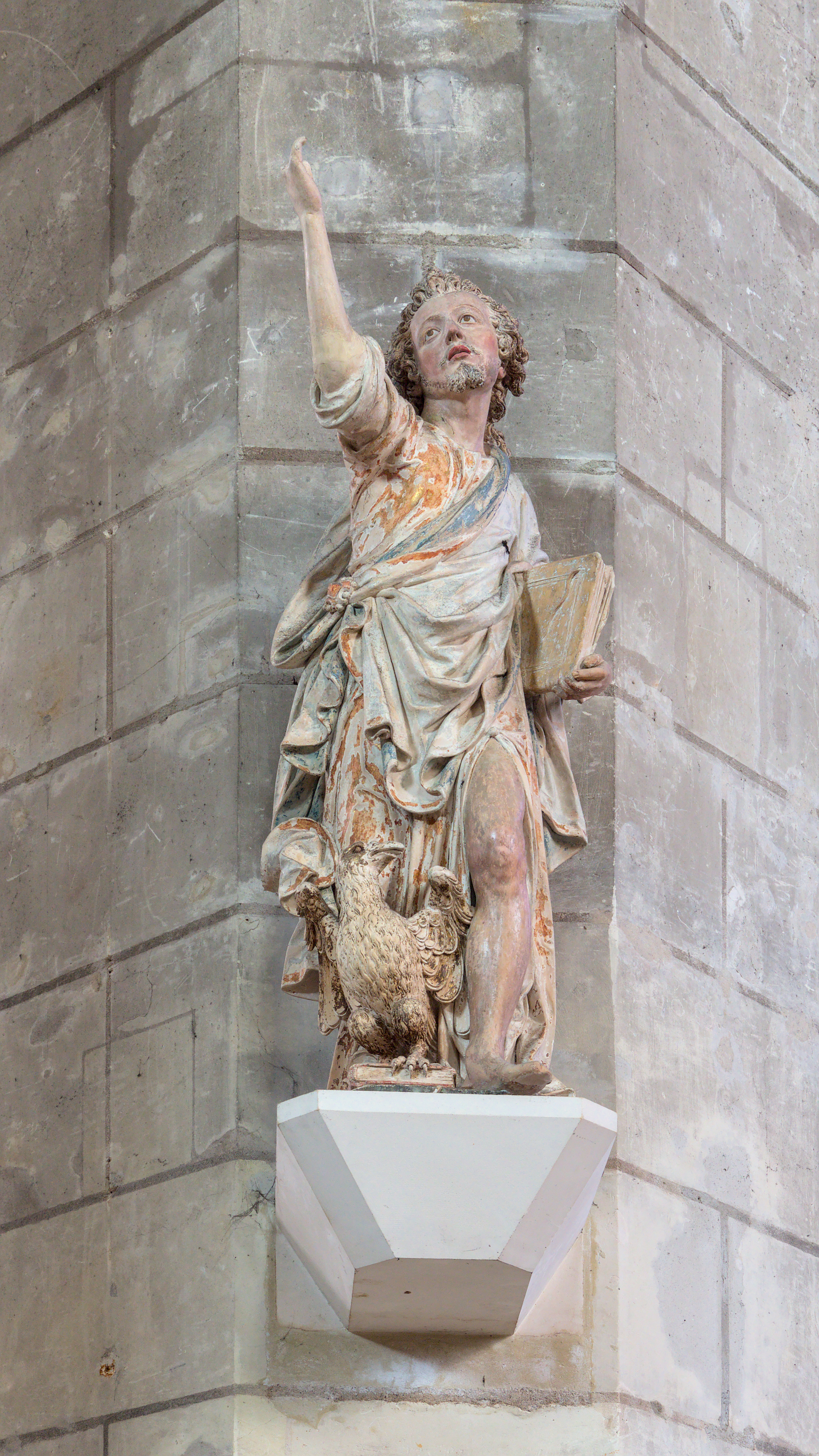
St John the Evangelist by Charles Hoyau, 17th c., terracotta
Stained Glass Windows

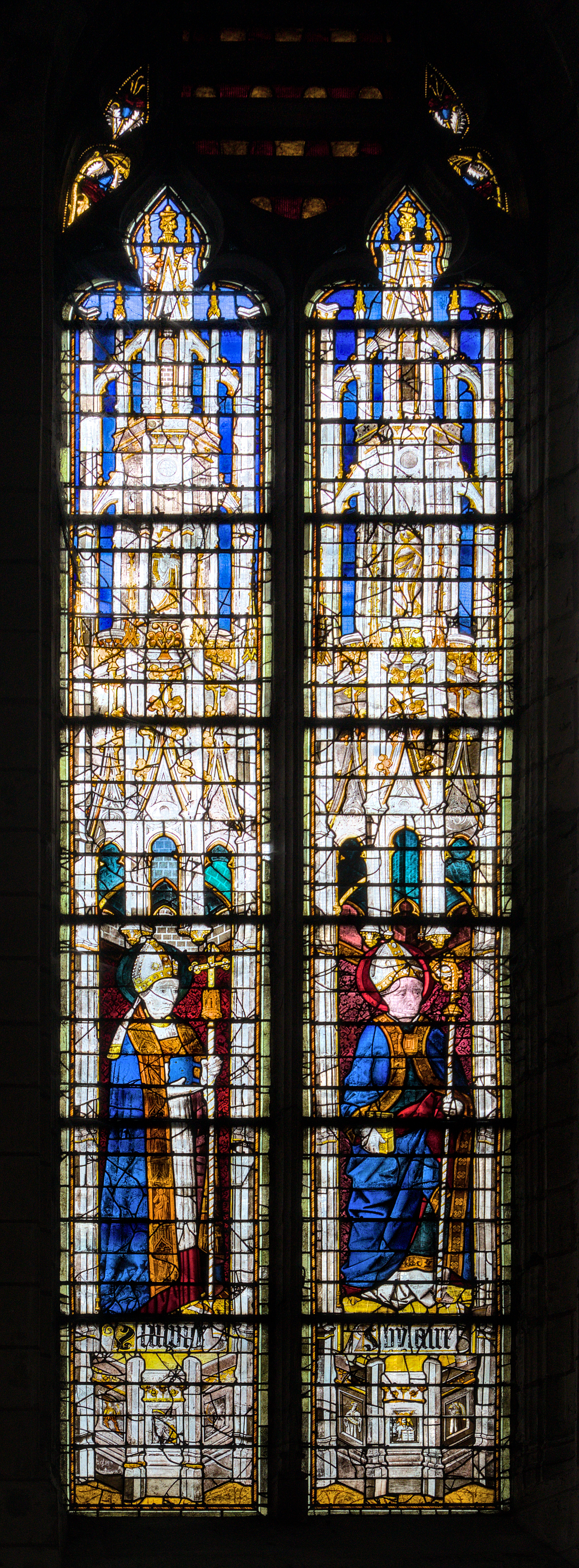
Saint Hilarius and Saint Sulpicius (16th c.)

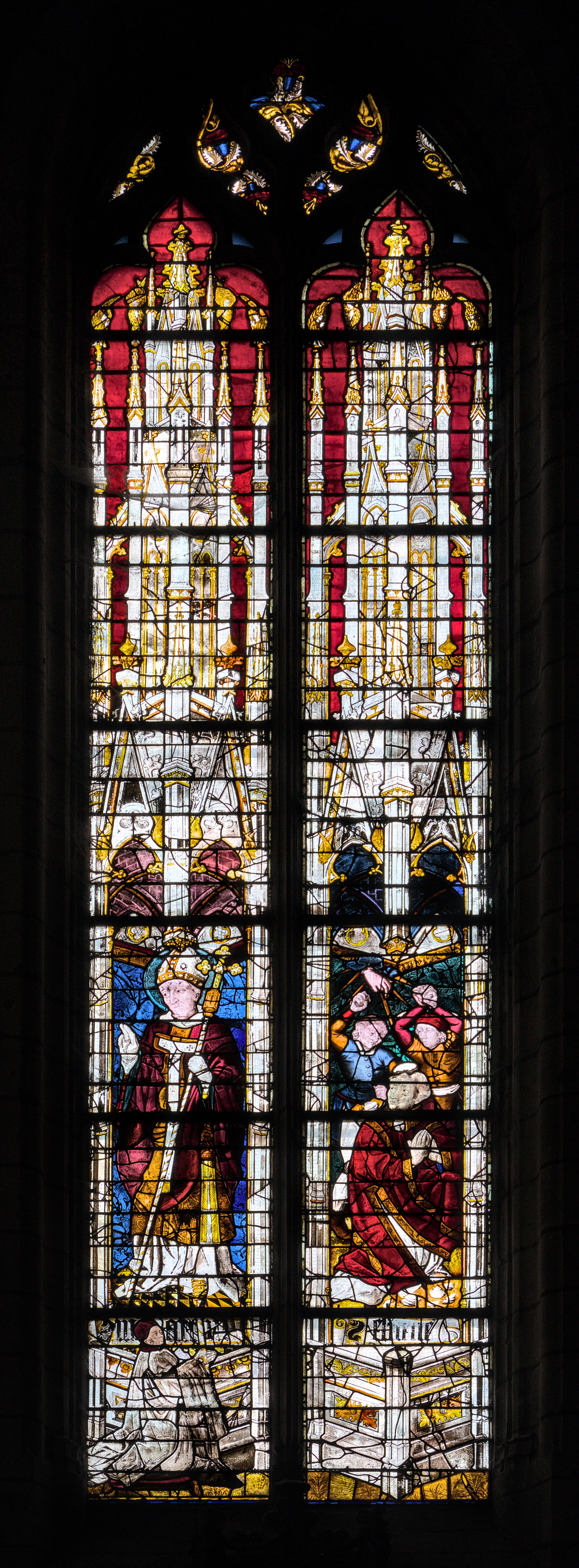
Saint Martin and the Stoning of Saint Stephen (16th c.)

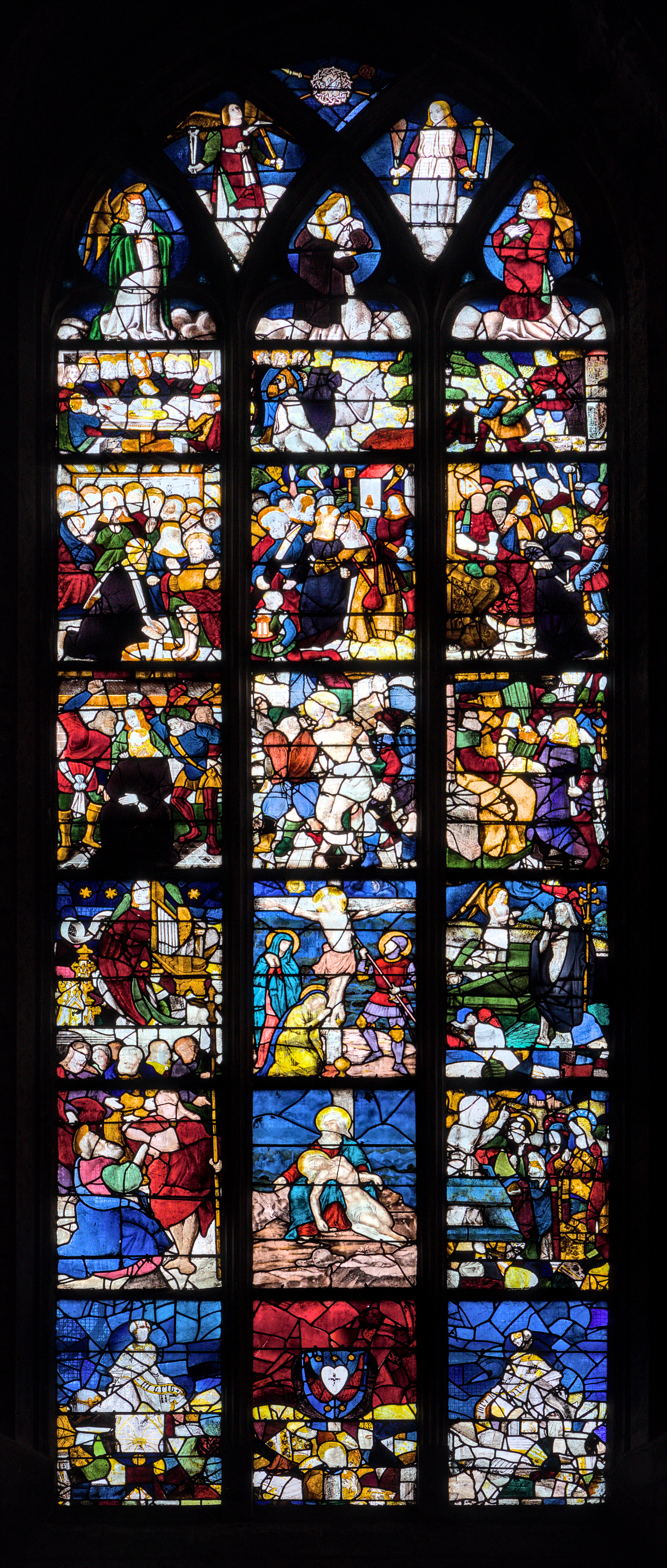
The Passion (16th c.)

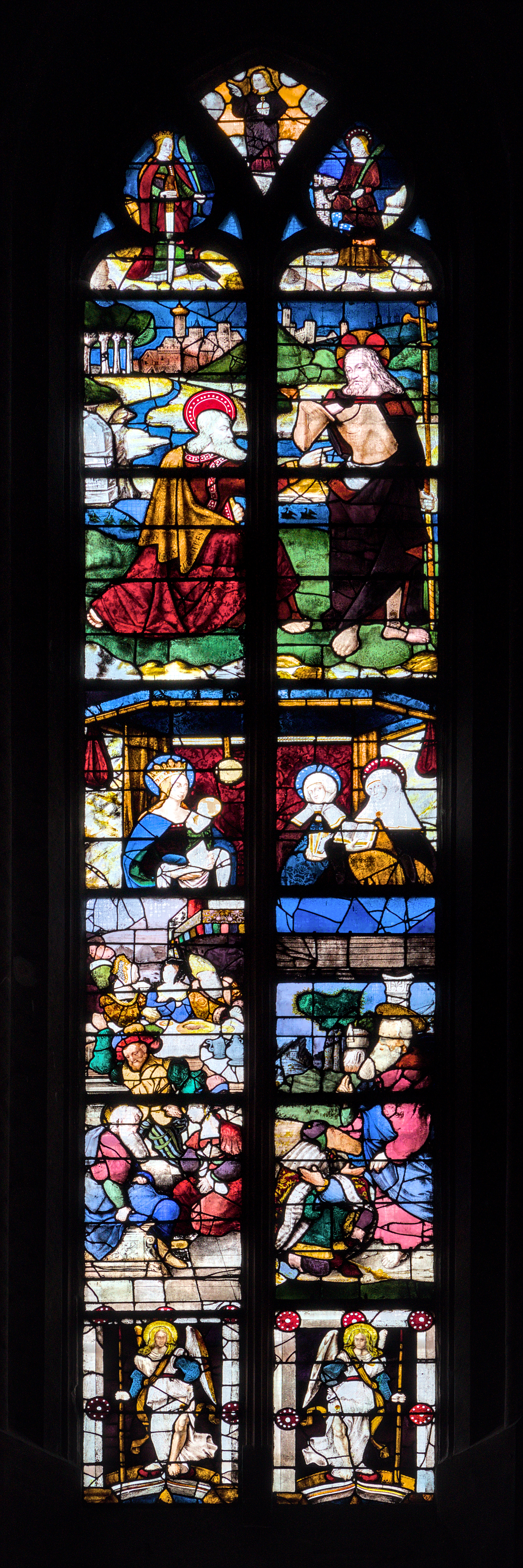
Christ Appears to Thomas (Note: Possibly a heavily-restored Noli Me Tangere, now with Thomas in place of Mary Magdalene.) and Childhood of the Virgin Mary (16th c.)

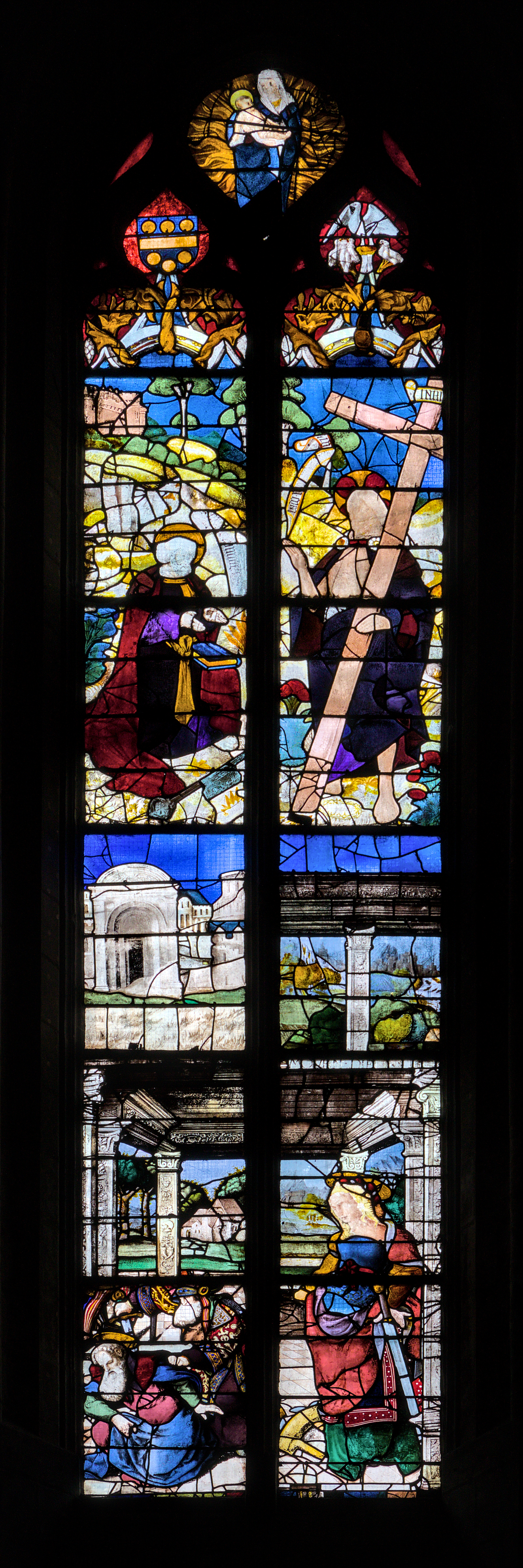
Christ Appears to Peter and part of an Annunciation (16th c.)

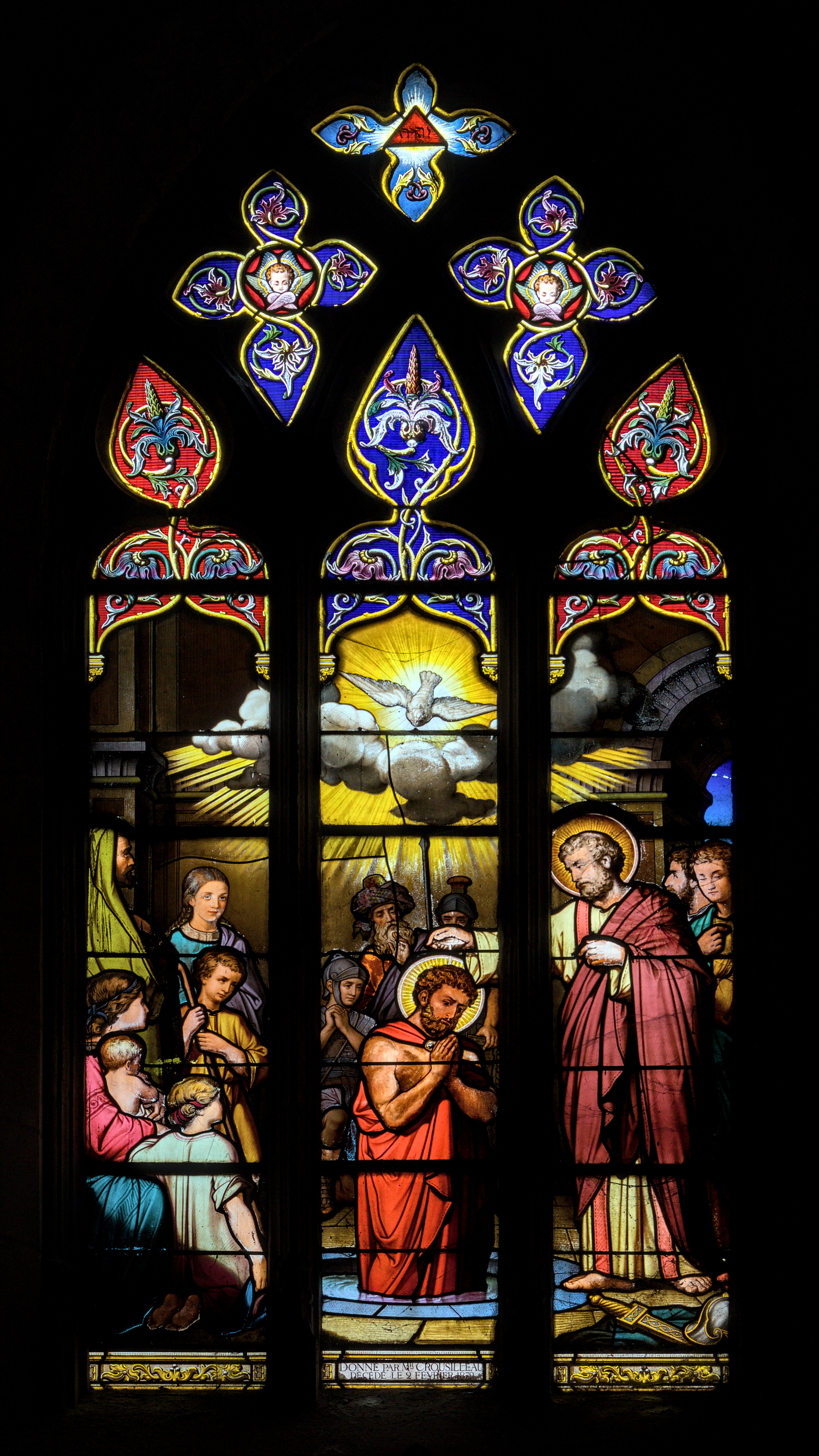
St Peter Baptises Cornelius the Centurion (19th c.)

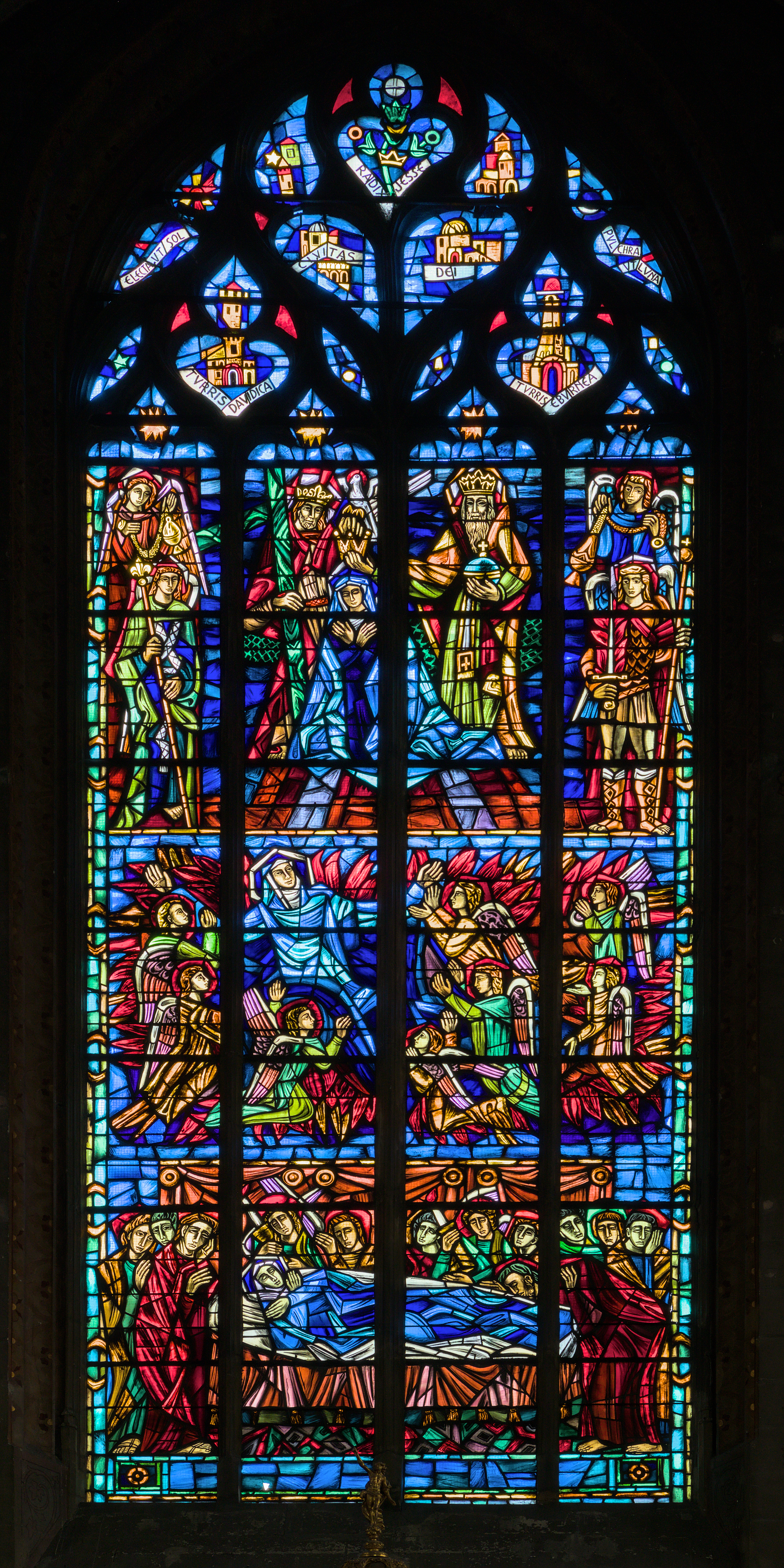
Death of the Virgin (Lobin studio, 19th c.)

== Bibliography (in French) ==
- Emmanuelle Goubard, Histoire de la paroisse Notre-Dame-la-Riche, à Tours, de la signature du Concordat jusqu'au débuts de la Monarchie de Juillet, mémoire de maîtrise, histoire contemporaine, Tours, université François Rabelais, 2003, 300 p, MM 25
- Sous la direction de Jean-Marie Pérouse de Montclos, Le guide du patrimoine Centre Val de Loire, p. 636, Hachette, Paris, 1992 ISBN 978-2-01-0185380
