= Tours Métropole Val de Loire =

Coordinates: 47°24′N 0°41′E

- Métropole
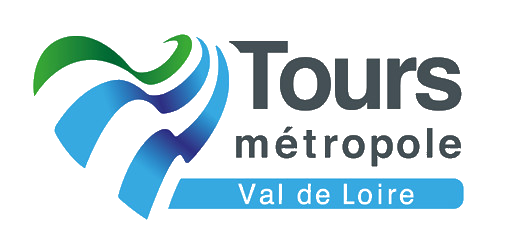

- Location in Indre-et-Loire.
- Country: France
- Region: Centre-Val de Loire
- Department: Indre-et-Loire
- No. of communes: {{{nbcomm}}}
- Established: 20 March 2017
- Area: 389.2 km^{2} (150.3 sq mi)
- Population (2018): 294,220
  - Density: 756.0/km^{2} (1,958/sq mi)
- Website: tours-metropole.fr

Tours Métropole Val de Loire (French pronunciation: [tuʁ metʁɔpɔl val də lwaʁ]) is the métropole, an intercommunal structure, centered on the city of Tours. It is located in the Indre-et-Loire department, in the Centre-Val de Loire region, central France. It was created on 20 March 2017, replacing the previous Communauté urbaine Tour(S) Plus. Its area is 389.2 km^{2}. Its population was 294,220 in 2018, of which 136,463 in Tours proper.

== Composition ==
Tours Métropole Val de Loire consists of the following 22 communes:

1. Ballan-Miré
2. Berthenay
3. Chambray-lès-Tours
4. Chanceaux-sur-Choisille
5. Druye
6. Fondettes
7. Joué-lès-Tours
8. Luynes
9. La Membrolle-sur-Choisille
10. Mettray
11. Notre-Dame-d'Oé
12. Parçay-Meslay
13. La Riche
14. Rochecorbon
15. Saint-Avertin
16. Saint-Cyr-sur-Loire
17. Saint-Étienne-de-Chigny
18. Saint-Genouph
19. Saint-Pierre-des-Corps
20. Savonnières
21. Tours
22. Villandry
