= Druye =

- Commune
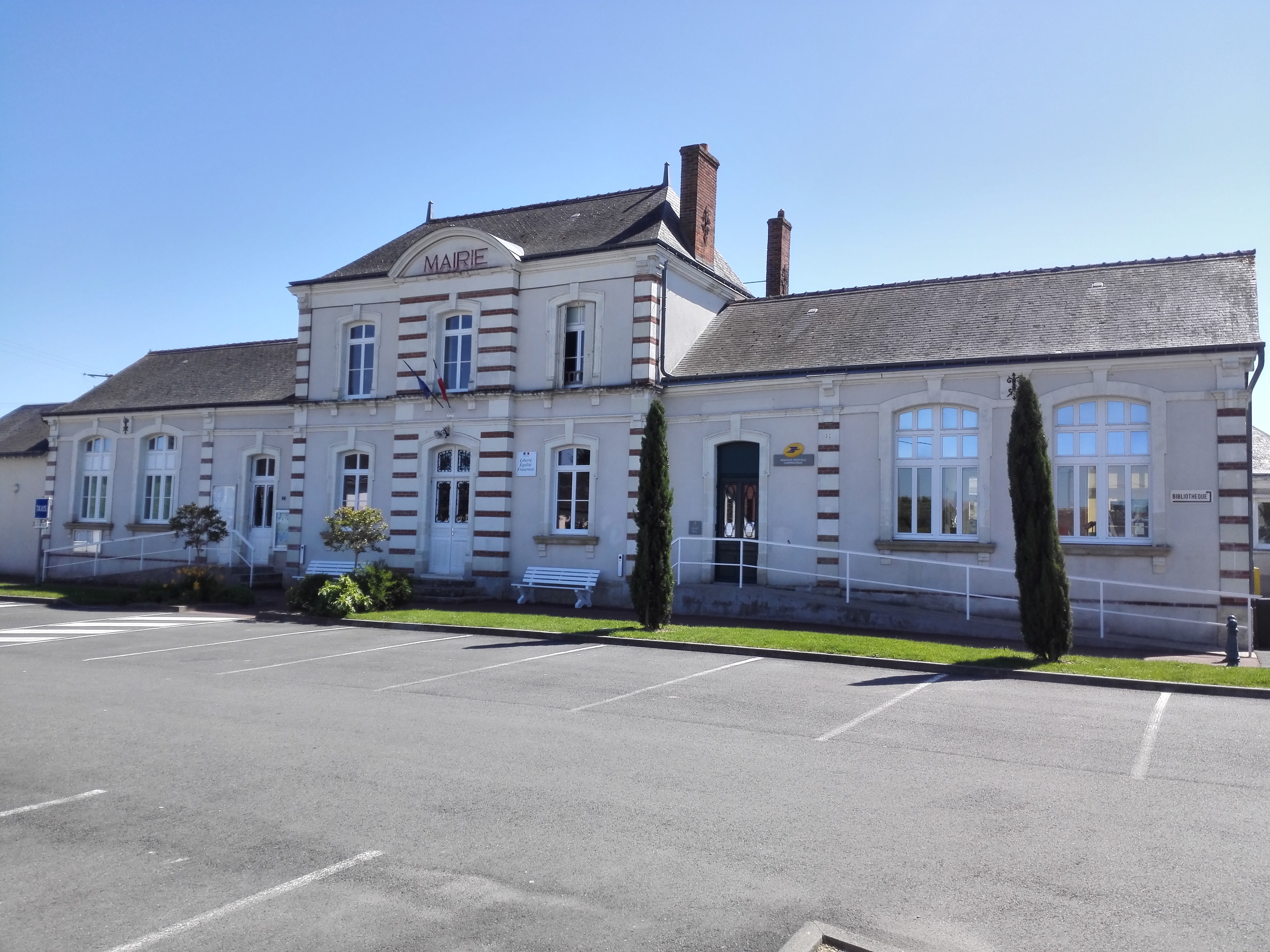
- Druye Town hall
- Location of Druye
- Location within France Location within Centre-Val de Loire
- Coordinates: 47°18′36″N 0°32′20″E
- Country: France
- Region: Centre-Val de Loire
- Department: Indre-et-Loire
- Arrondissement: Tours
- Canton: Ballan-Miré
- Intercommunality: Tours Métropole Val de Loire

Government
  - Mayor (2020–2026): Corinne Chailleux
- Area^{1}: 22.87 km^{2} (8.83 sq mi)
- Highest elevation: 101 m (331 ft)
- Lowest elevation: 69 m (226 ft)
- Population (2023): 1,024
  - Density: 44.77/km^{2} (116.0/sq mi)
- Time zone: UTC+01:00 (CET)
  - Summer (DST): UTC+02:00 (CEST)
- INSEE/Postal code: 37099 /37190
- ^{1} French Land Register data, which excludes lakes, ponds, glaciers > 1 km^{2} (0.386 sq mi or 247 acres) and river estuaries.

Druye (French pronunciation: [dʁɥi]) is a commune in the Indre-et-Loire department, central France.

== Population ==
Historical population
Year	Pop.	±% p.a.
1968	466	—
1975	530	+1.86%
1982	578	+1.25%
1990	681	+2.07%
1999	721	+0.64%
2007	864	+2.29%
2012	948	+1.87%
2017	950	+0.04%
2023	1,024	+1.26%
Source: INSEE

The inhabitants are called Druyens or Druyennes in French.

== See also ==
- Communes of the Indre-et-Loire department
