= Saint-Genouph =

- Commune
- Location of Saint-Genouph
- Location within France Location within Centre-Val de Loire
- Coordinates: 47°22′46″N 0°35′58″E
- Country: France
- Region: Centre-Val de Loire
- Department: Indre-et-Loire
- Arrondissement: Tours
- Canton: Ballan-Miré
- Intercommunality: Tours Métropole Val de Loire

Government
  - Mayor (2020–2026): Patricia Suard
- Area^{1}: 4.74 km^{2} (1.83 sq mi)
- Highest elevation: 49 m (161 ft)
- Lowest elevation: 42 m (138 ft)
- Population (2023): 1,019
  - Density: 215/km^{2} (557/sq mi)
- Time zone: UTC+01:00 (CET)
  - Summer (DST): UTC+02:00 (CEST)
- INSEE/Postal code: 37219 /37510
- ^{1} French Land Register data, which excludes lakes, ponds, glaciers > 1 km^{2} (0.386 sq mi or 247 acres) and river estuaries.

Saint-Genouph (French pronunciation: [sɛ̃ ʒənu]) is a commune in the Indre-et-Loire department in central France.

== Population ==
Historical population
Year	Pop.	±% p.a.
1968	672	—
1975	748	+1.54%
1982	805	+1.05%
1990	873	+1.02%
1999	940	+0.82%
2007	1,015	+0.96%
2012	1,039	+0.47%
2017	1,050	+0.21%
2023	1,019	−0.50%
Source: INSEE

== See also ==
- Communes of the Indre-et-Loire department
