= La Riche =

- Commune
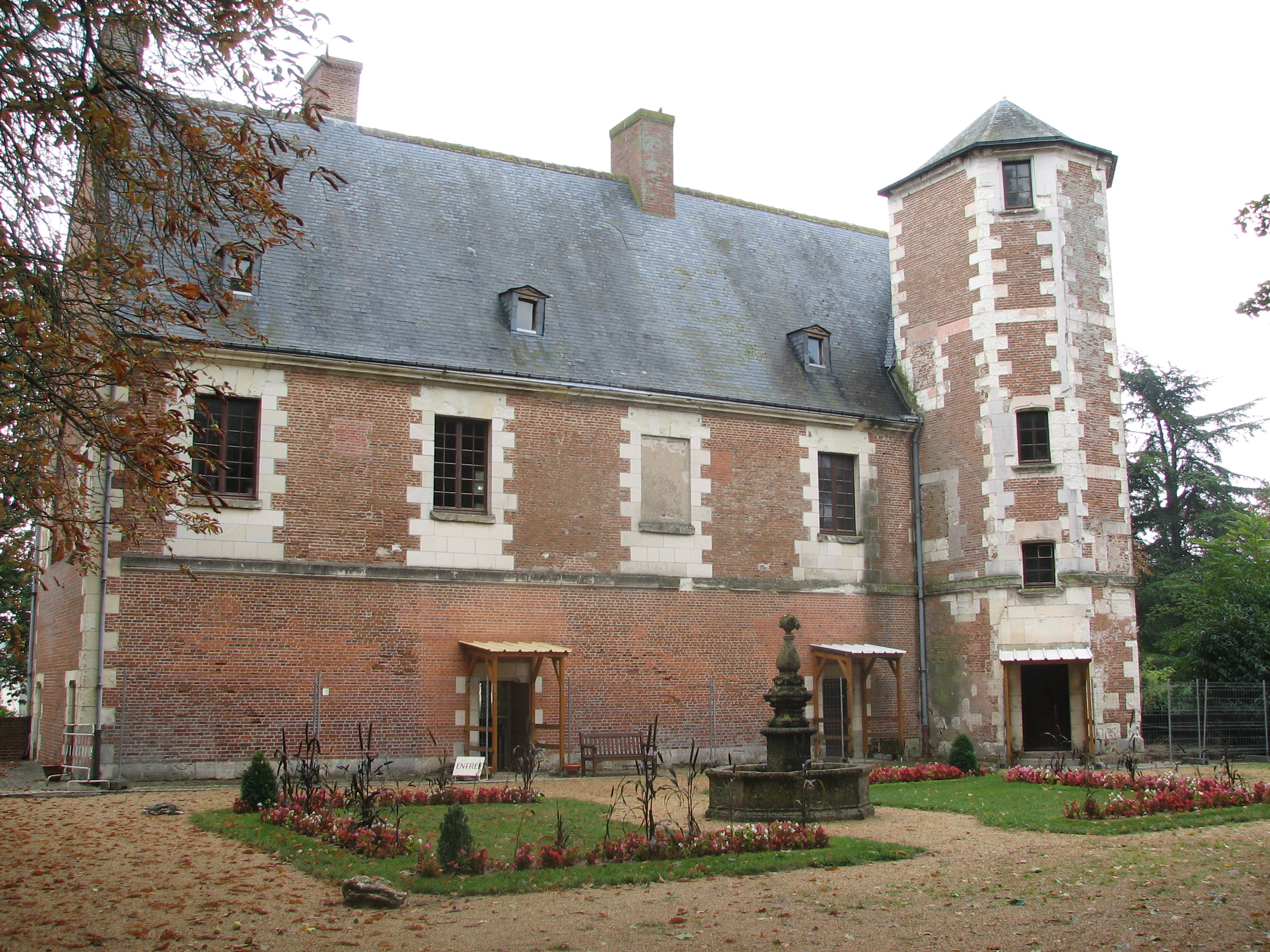
- Château de Plessis-lez-Tours

- Coat of arms
- Location of La Riche
- Location within France Location within Centre-Val de Loire
- Coordinates: 47°23′24″N 0°39′41″E
- Country: France
- Region: Centre-Val de Loire
- Department: Indre-et-Loire
- Arrondissement: Tours
- Canton: Ballan-Miré
- Intercommunality: Tours Métropole Val de Loire

Government
  - Mayor (2023–2026): Sébastien Clement
- Area^{1}: 8.17 km^{2} (3.15 sq mi)
- Highest elevation: 51 m (167 ft)
- Lowest elevation: 43 m (141 ft)
- Population (2023): 10,487
  - Density: 1,280/km^{2} (3,320/sq mi)
- Time zone: UTC+01:00 (CET)
  - Summer (DST): UTC+02:00 (CEST)
- INSEE/Postal code: 37195 /37520
- ^{1} French Land Register data, which excludes lakes, ponds, glaciers > 1 km^{2} (0.386 sq mi or 247 acres) and river estuaries.

La Riche (French pronunciation: [la ʁiʃ]) is a commune in the Indre-et-Loire department in central France. It is part of the agglomeration of Tours and is named after Notre-Dame-la-Riche Church.

== Population ==
Historical population

Year	Pop.	±% p.a.
1793	1,000	—
1800	856	−2.20%
1806	871	+0.29%
1821	1,011	+1.00%
1831	1,234	+2.01%
1836	1,131	−1.73%
1841	1,197	+1.14%
1846	1,233	+0.59%
1851	1,372	+2.16%
1856	1,508	+1.91%
1861	1,560	+0.68%
1866	1,568	+0.10%
1872	1,670	+1.06%
1876	1,829	+2.30%
1881	2,005	+1.85%
1886	2,160	+1.50%
1891	2,335	+1.57%
1896	2,317	−0.15%
1901	2,456	+1.17%

Year	Pop.	±% p.a.
1906	2,419	−0.30%
1911	2,536	+0.95%
1921	2,730	+0.74%
1926	3,043	+2.19%
1931	3,415	+2.33%
1936	4,020	+3.32%
1946	4,045	+0.06%
1954	4,407	+1.08%
1962	6,324	+4.62%
1968	6,331	+0.02%
1975	6,670	+0.75%
1982	7,261	+1.22%
1990	7,838	+0.96%
1999	8,594	+1.03%
2007	9,990	+1.90%
2012	10,207	+0.43%
2017	10,448	+0.47%
2023	10,487	+0.06%

Source: EHESS and INSEE (1968–2023)

== See also ==
- Château de Plessis-lez-Tours
- Communes of the Indre-et-Loire department
