= Grottes Pétrifiantes de Savonnières =

Coordinates: 47°20′45″N 0°31′52″E

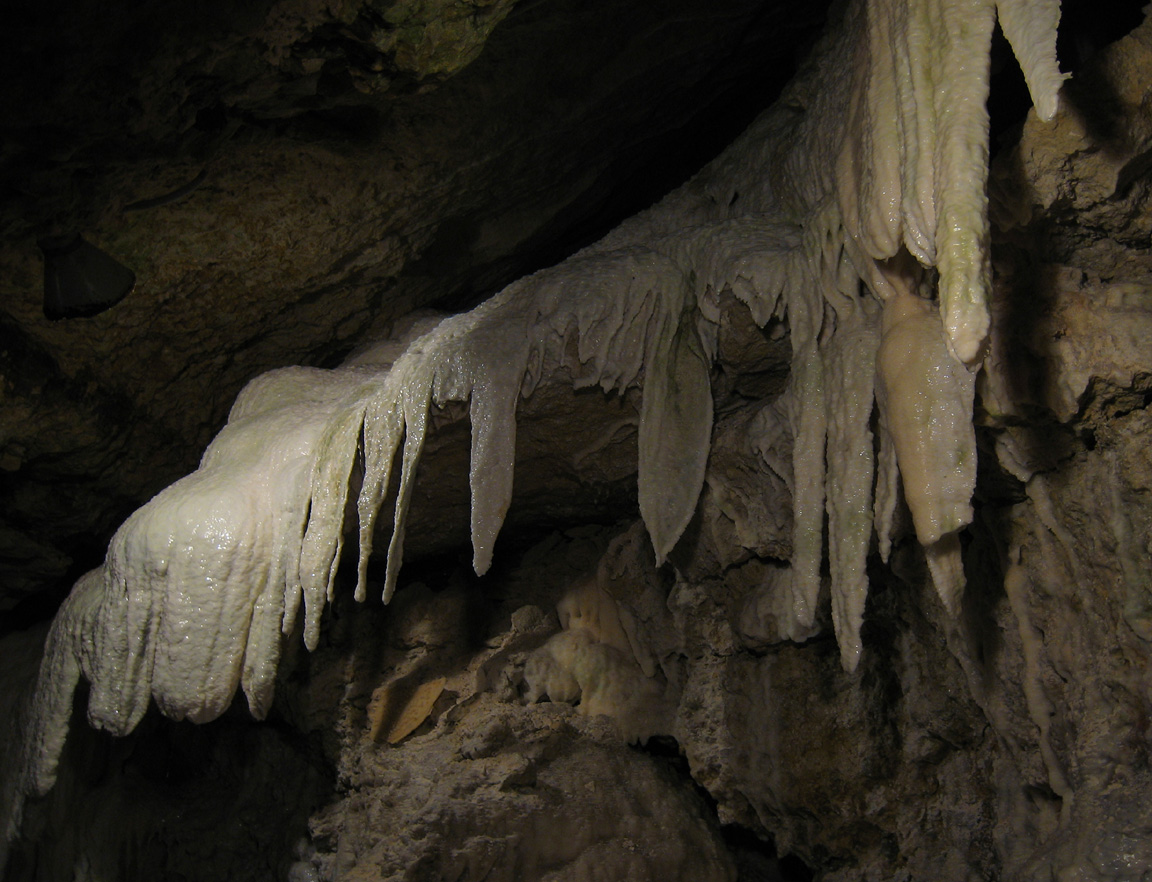
Les Grottes Pétrifiantes de Savonnières

Les Grottes Pétrifiantes de Savonnières, also known as the caves gouttières, are two grottoes located in Savonnières, Indre-et-Loire, France.

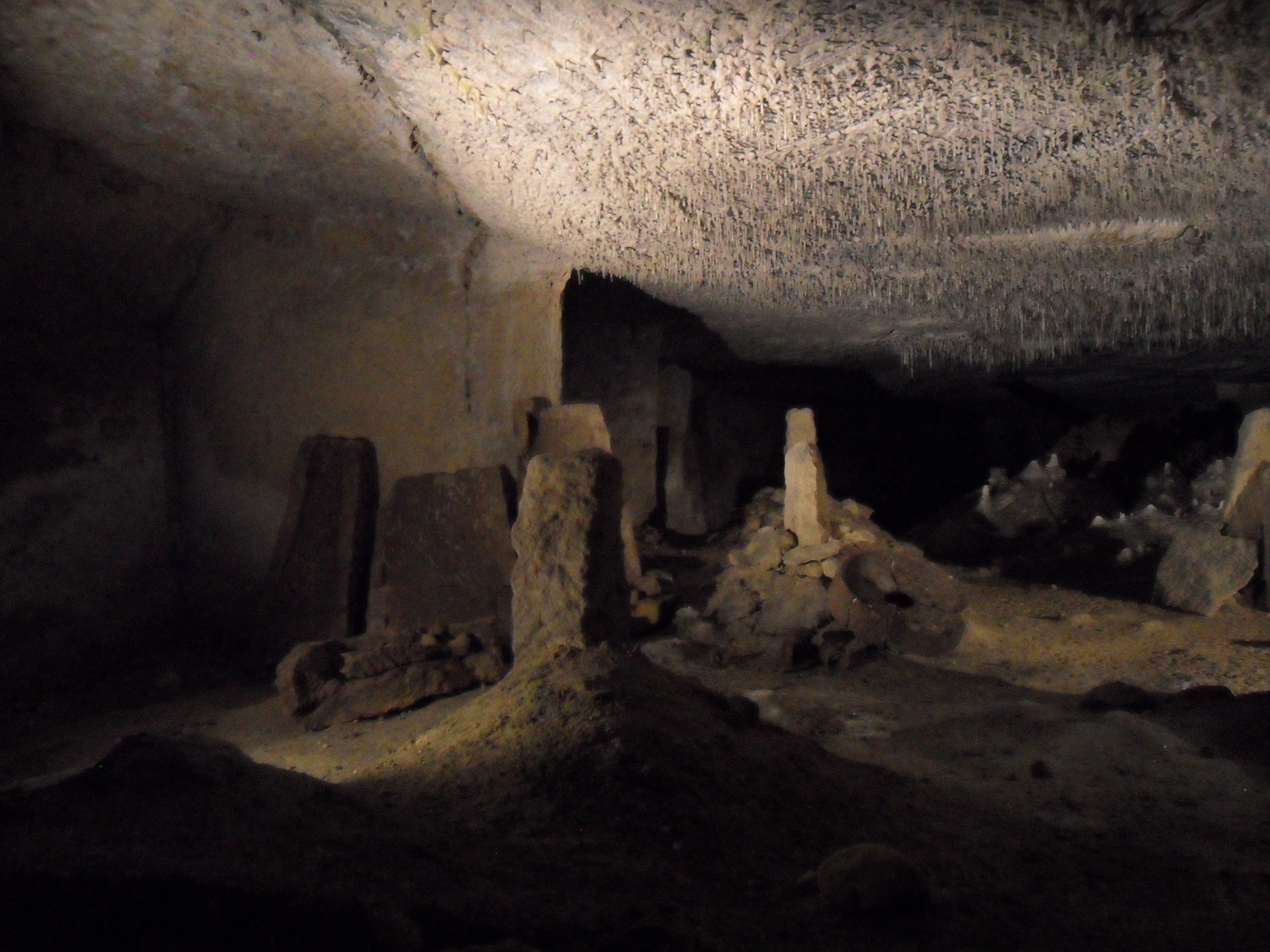
Roman gravestones

The Romans were present in the caves, as evidenced by the discovery of pottery, manual mills, and a graveyard, with seven gravestones remaining. The grottoes were mostly formed during the Middle Ages, the stone (tuffeau) being used to build châteaux. Centuries later, the caves were flooded with water, slowly creating new passages. They were visited by Bernard Palissy in 1547, and an extension (the second grotto) was discovered by a speleologist (Gilles) in 1947. In the 1960s, the grottoes were managed by their owner as to allow access to tourists. They were added to ANECAT (Association Nationale des Exploitants de Cavernes Aménagées pour le Tourisme), and have since become a popular tourist attraction.

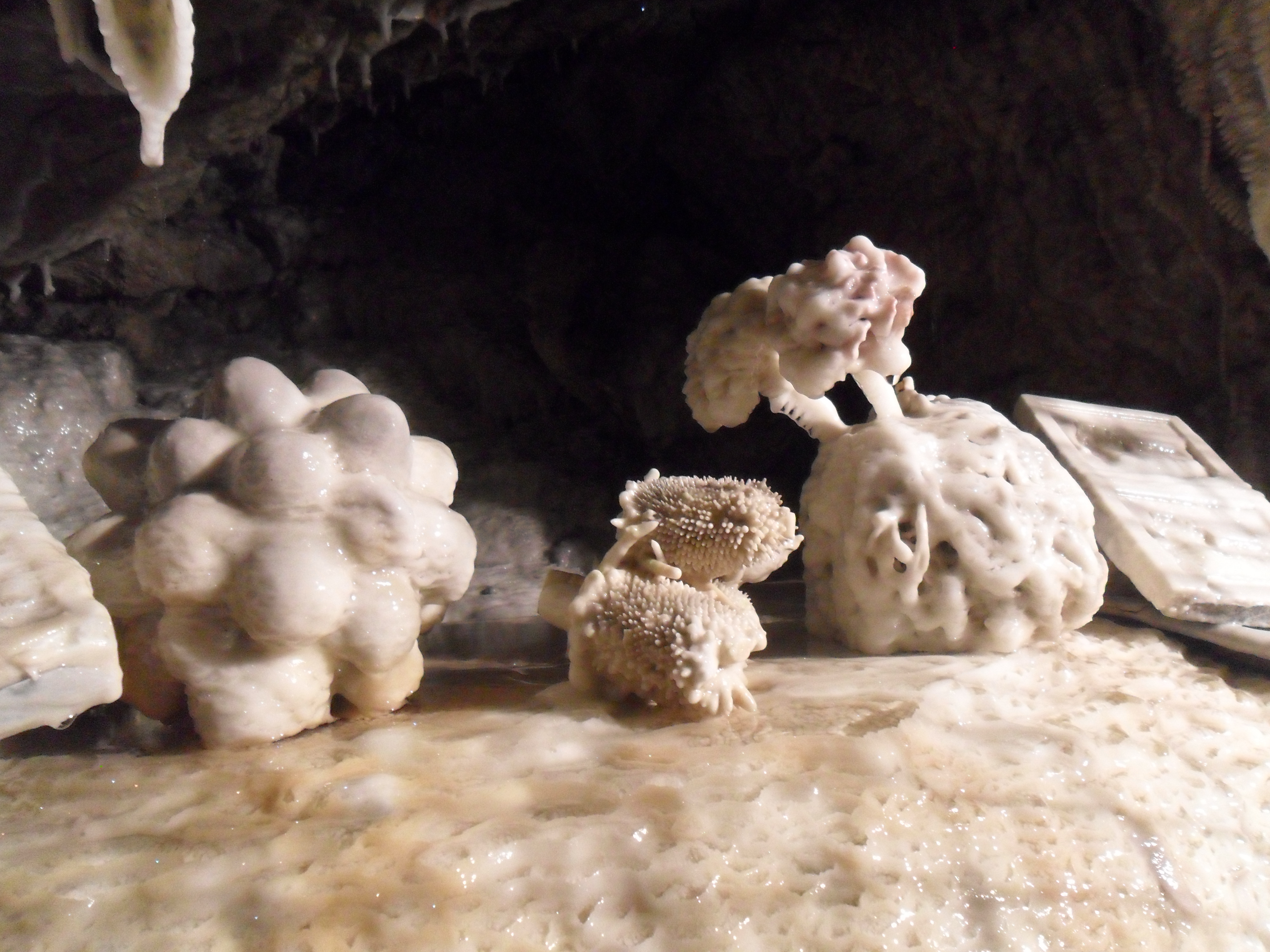
"Petrified" plants

Objects are put under the grottoes' springs for six months to a year, which covers them in limestone, creating a "petrified" look.
