= Berthenay =

- Commune
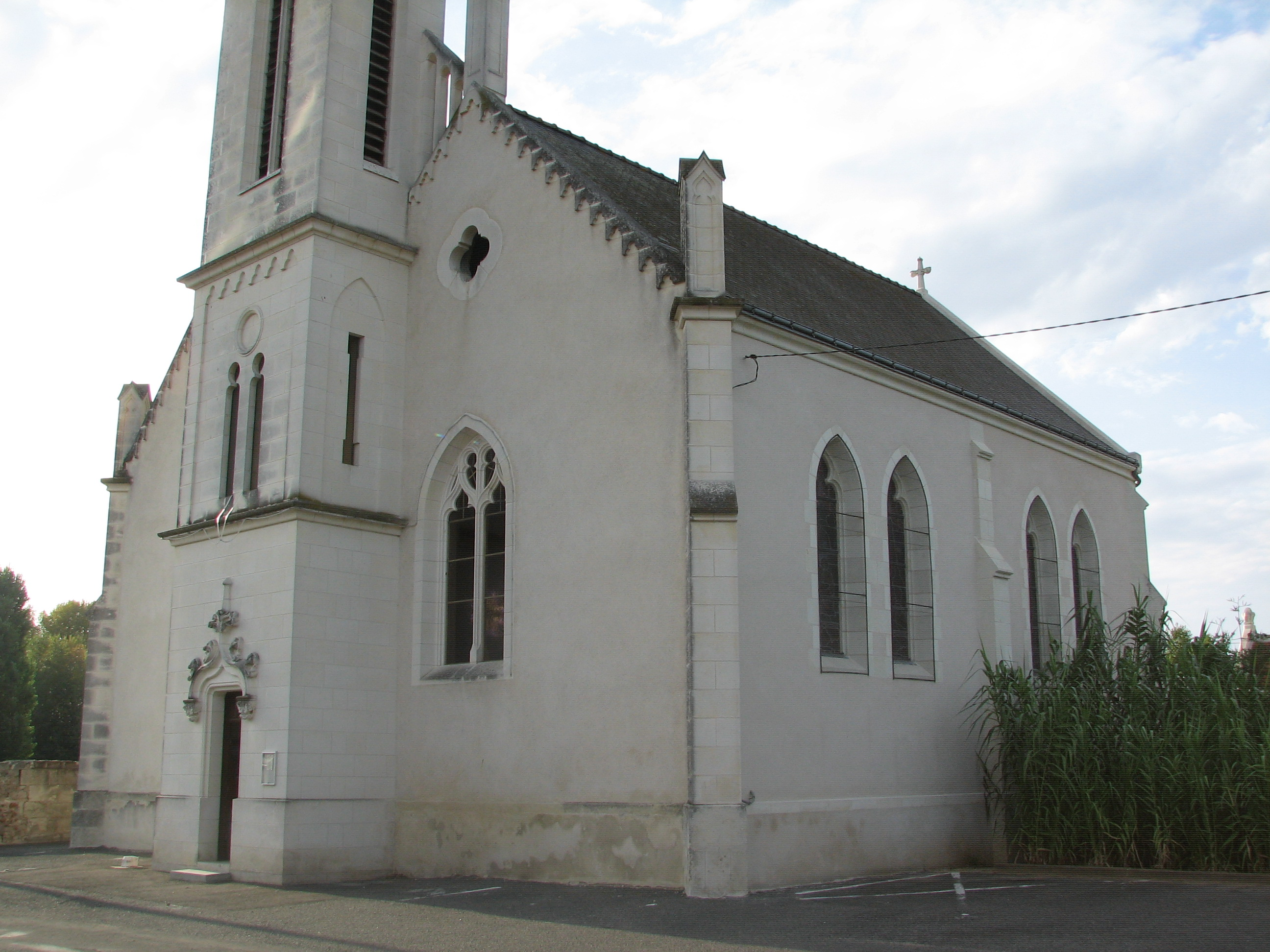
- The church in Berthenay
- Location of Berthenay
- Location within France Location within Centre-Val de Loire
- Coordinates: 47°21′50″N 0°31′30″E
- Country: France
- Region: Centre-Val de Loire
- Department: Indre-et-Loire
- Arrondissement: Tours
- Canton: Ballan-Miré
- Intercommunality: Tours Métropole Val de Loire

Government
  - Mayor (2020–2026): Christophe Loyau-Tulasne
- Area^{1}: 7.24 km^{2} (2.80 sq mi)
- Highest elevation: 45 m (148 ft)
- Lowest elevation: 37 m (121 ft)
- Population (2023): 707
  - Density: 97.7/km^{2} (253/sq mi)
- Time zone: UTC+01:00 (CET)
  - Summer (DST): UTC+02:00 (CEST)
- INSEE/Postal code: 37025 /37510
- ^{1} French Land Register data, which excludes lakes, ponds, glaciers > 1 km^{2} (0.386 sq mi or 247 acres) and river estuaries.

Berthenay (French pronunciation: [bɛʁtənɛ]) is a commune in the Indre-et-Loire department in central France. Berthenay is bordered by the river Loire and is near the city of Tours.

== Population ==
Historical population
Year	Pop.	±% p.a.
1968	340	—
1975	317	−1.00%
1982	342	+1.09%
1990	570	+6.59%
1999	674	+1.88%
2007	703	+0.53%
2012	739	+1.00%
2017	708	−0.85%
2023	707	−0.02%
Source: INSEE

== See also ==
- Communes of the Indre-et-Loire department
