= Savonnières =

- Commune
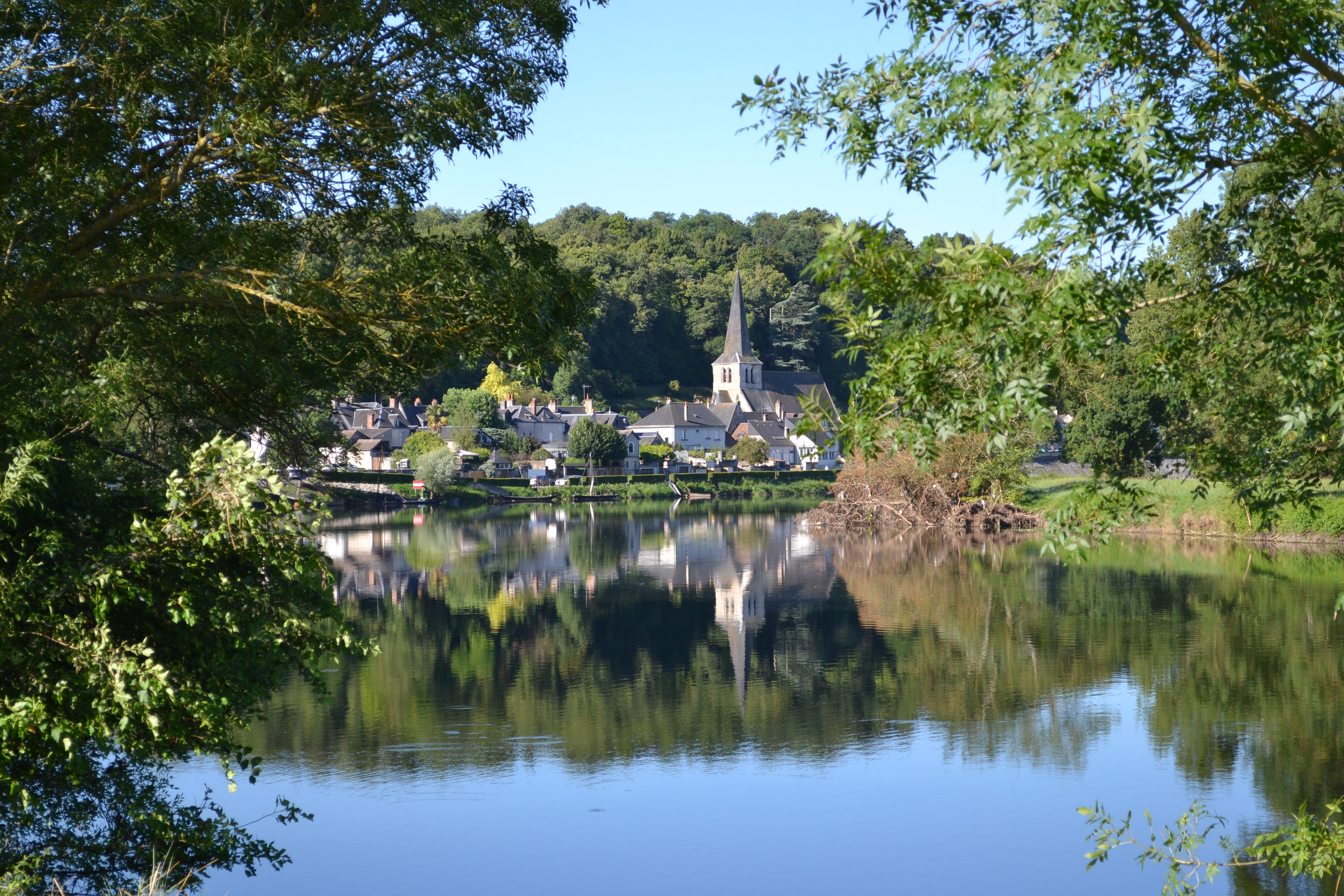
- View of the town from the Cher

- Coat of arms
- Location of Savonnières
- Location within France Location within Centre-Val de Loire
- Coordinates: 47°20′55″N 0°32′57″E
- Country: France
- Region: Centre-Val de Loire
- Department: Indre-et-Loire
- Arrondissement: Tours
- Canton: Ballan-Miré
- Intercommunality: Tours Métropole Val de Loire

Government
  - Mayor (2020–2026): Nathalie Savaton
- Area^{1}: 16.46 km^{2} (6.36 sq mi)
- Highest elevation: 96 m (315 ft)
- Lowest elevation: 37 m (121 ft)
- Population (2023): 3,392
  - Density: 206.1/km^{2} (533.7/sq mi)
- Time zone: UTC+01:00 (CET)
  - Summer (DST): UTC+02:00 (CEST)
- INSEE/Postal code: 37243 /37510
- ^{1} French Land Register data, which excludes lakes, ponds, glaciers > 1 km^{2} (0.386 sq mi or 247 acres) and river estuaries.

Savonnières (French pronunciation: [savɔnjɛʁ]) is a commune in the Indre-et-Loire department in central France.

== Population ==
Historical population

Year	Pop.	±% p.a.
1793	1,166	—
1800	1,305	+1.62%
1806	1,344	+0.49%
1821	1,353	+0.04%
1831	1,358	+0.04%
1836	1,305	−0.79%
1841	1,254	−0.79%
1846	1,258	+0.06%
1851	1,289	+0.49%
1856	1,366	+1.17%
1861	1,332	−0.50%
1866	1,306	−0.39%
1872	1,234	−0.94%
1876	1,284	+1.00%
1881	1,326	+0.65%
1886	1,316	−0.15%
1891	1,262	−0.83%
1896	1,216	−0.74%
1901	1,195	−0.35%

Year	Pop.	±% p.a.
1906	1,169	−0.44%
1911	1,101	−1.19%
1921	1,027	−0.69%
1926	992	−0.69%
1931	947	−0.92%
1936	936	−0.23%
1946	971	+0.37%
1954	1,034	+0.79%
1962	1,116	+0.96%
1968	1,260	+2.04%
1975	1,446	+1.99%
1982	1,813	+3.28%
1990	2,030	+1.42%
1999	2,558	+2.60%
2007	2,970	+1.88%
2012	3,132	+1.07%
2017	3,152	+0.13%
2023	3,392	+1.23%

Source: EHESS and INSEE (1968-2023)

== See also ==
- Les Grottes Pétrifiantes de Savonnières
- Communes of the Indre-et-Loire department
