= Villandry =

- Commune
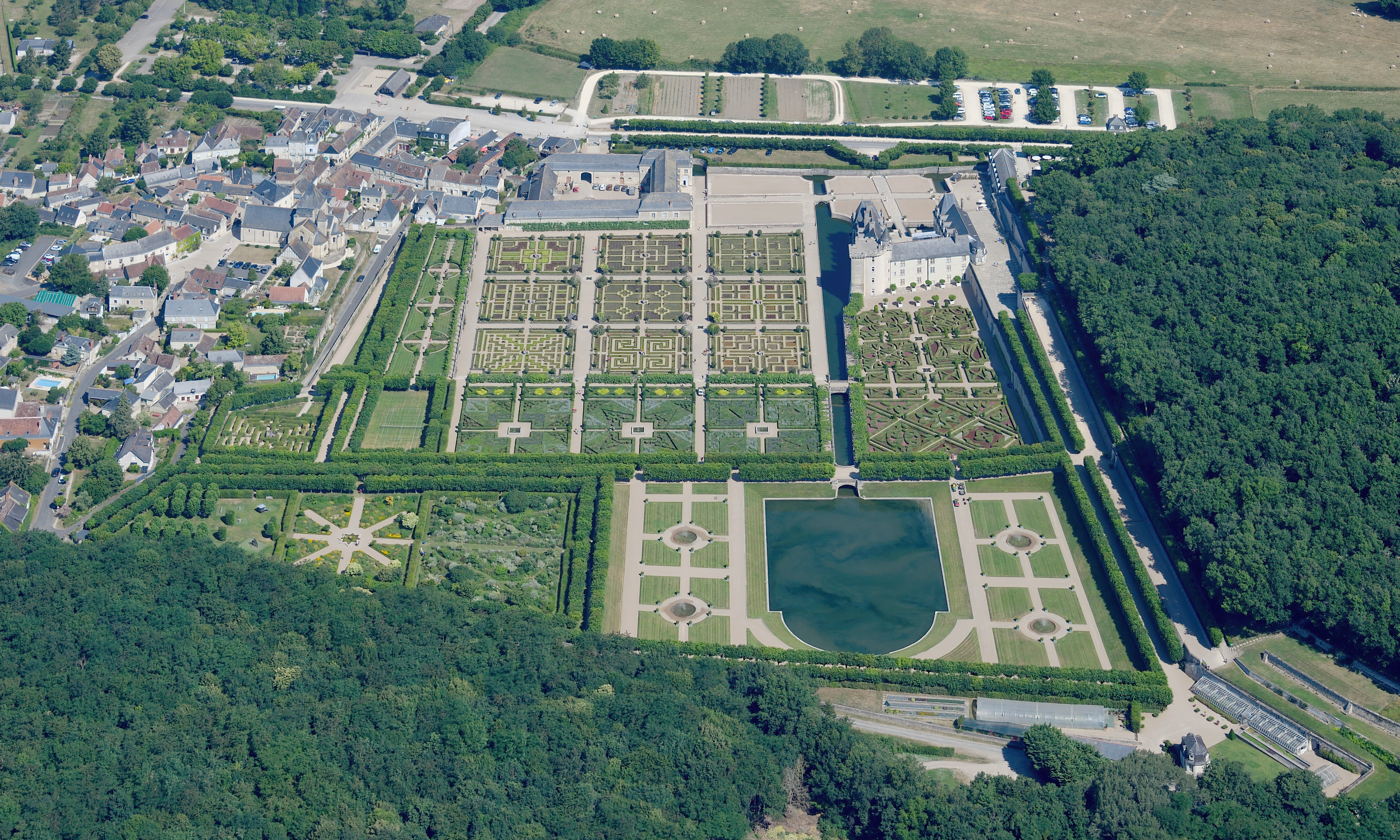
- Château de Villandry and its garden

- Coat of arms
- Location of Villandry
- Location within France Location within Centre-Val de Loire
- Coordinates: 47°20′25″N 0°30′43″E
- Country: France
- Region: Centre-Val de Loire
- Department: Indre-et-Loire
- Arrondissement: Tours
- Canton: Ballan-Miré
- Intercommunality: Tours Métropole Val de Loire

Government
  - Mayor (2020–2026): Maria Lépine
- Area^{1}: 17.8 km^{2} (6.9 sq mi)
- Highest elevation: 97 m (318 ft)
- Lowest elevation: 38 m (125 ft)
- Population (2023): 1,143
  - Density: 64.2/km^{2} (166/sq mi)
- Time zone: UTC+01:00 (CET)
  - Summer (DST): UTC+02:00 (CEST)
- INSEE/Postal code: 37272 /37510
- ^{1} French Land Register data, which excludes lakes, ponds, glaciers > 1 km^{2} (0.386 sq mi or 247 acres) and river estuaries.

Villandry (French pronunciation: [vilɑ̃dʁi]) is a commune in the Indre-et-Loire department in central France. The Château de Villandry is located there.

== Population ==
Historical population
Year	Pop.	±% p.a.
1968	610	—
1975	679	+1.54%
1982	742	+1.28%
1990	776	+0.56%
1999	920	+1.91%
2007	1,097	+2.22%
2012	1,072	−0.46%
2017	1,114	+0.77%
2023	1,143	+0.43%
Source: INSEE

== See also ==
- Communes of the Indre-et-Loire department
