= Canton of Ballan-Miré =

Coordinates: 47.34°N 0.61°E

The canton of Ballan-Miré is an administrative division of the Indre-et-Loire department, central France. Its borders were not modified at the French canton reorganisation which came into effect in March 2015. Its seat is in Ballan-Miré.

It consists of the following communes:

1. Ballan-Miré
2. Berthenay
3. Druye
4. La Riche
5. Saint-Genouph
6. Savonnières
7. Villandry

== Notable people ==
- Michel Lezeau, mayor 1977-2007
