= Ballan-Miré =

- Commune
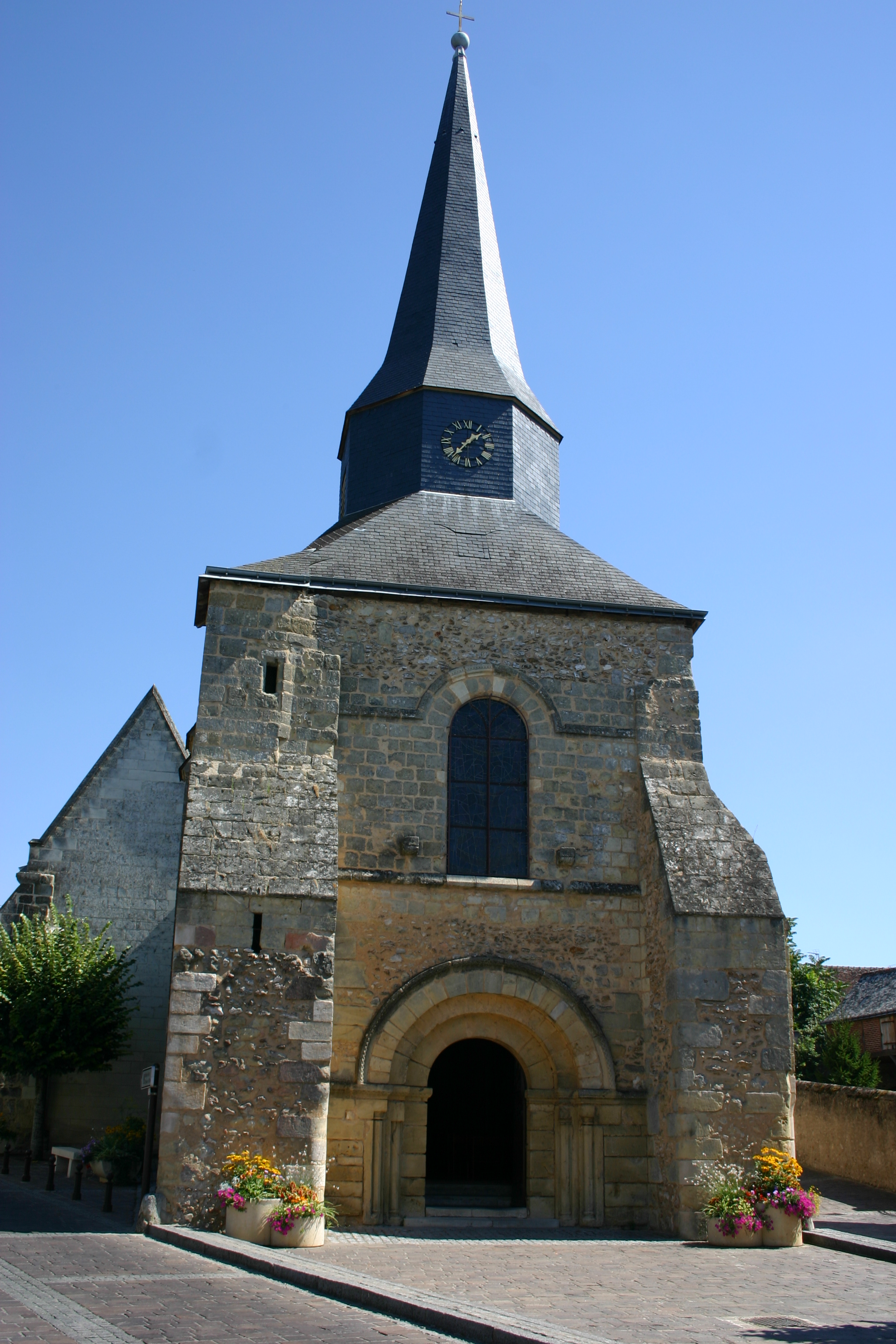
- The church in Ballan-Miré

- Coat of arms
- Location of Ballan-Miré
- Location within France Location within Centre-Val de Loire
- Coordinates: 47°20′33″N 0°36′50″E
- Country: France
- Region: Centre-Val de Loire
- Department: Indre-et-Loire
- Arrondissement: Tours
- Canton: Ballan-Miré
- Intercommunality: Tours Métropole Val de Loire

Government
  - Mayor (2020–2026): Thierry Chailloux
- Area^{1}: 26.16 km^{2} (10.10 sq mi)
- Highest elevation: 99 m (325 ft)
- Lowest elevation: 43 m (141 ft)
- Population (2023): 8,477
  - Density: 324.0/km^{2} (839.3/sq mi)
- Time zone: UTC+01:00 (CET)
  - Summer (DST): UTC+02:00 (CEST)
- INSEE/Postal code: 37018 /37510
- ^{1} French Land Register data, which excludes lakes, ponds, glaciers > 1 km^{2} (0.386 sq mi or 247 acres) and river estuaries.

Ballan-Miré (French pronunciation: [balɑ̃ miʁe]) is a commune in the Indre-et-Loire department, central France.

The commune was established 1818 by merger of the former communes of Ballan and Miré. It is located southwest of Tours.

== Population ==
Historical population

Year	Pop.	±% p.a.
1793	930	—
1800	819	−1.80%
1806	992	+3.25%
1821	1,236	+1.48%
1831	1,192	−0.36%
1836	1,155	−0.63%
1841	1,026	−2.34%
1846	1,201	+3.20%
1851	1,159	−0.71%
1856	1,169	+0.17%
1861	1,145	−0.41%
1866	1,222	+1.31%
1872	1,157	−0.91%
1876	1,232	+1.58%
1881	1,319	+1.37%
1886	1,367	+0.72%
1891	1,358	−0.13%
1896	1,346	−0.18%
1901	1,391	+0.66%

Year	Pop.	±% p.a.
1906	1,405	+0.20%
1911	1,246	−2.37%
1921	1,227	−0.15%
1926	1,301	+1.18%
1931	1,355	+0.82%
1936	1,248	−1.63%
1946	1,337	+0.69%
1954	1,363	+0.24%
1962	1,514	+1.32%
1968	2,618	+9.56%
1975	3,739	+5.22%
1982	4,491	+2.65%
1990	5,937	+3.55%
1999	7,059	+1.94%
2007	7,604	+0.93%
2012	8,043	+1.13%
2017	7,975	−0.17%
2023	8,477	+1.02%

Source: EHESS and INSEE (1968-2023)

== See also ==
- Communes of the Indre-et-Loire department
