= Château de Plessis-lez-Tours =

Château remains listed as a monument historique

Coordinates: 47°22′58″N 0°39′38″E

The royal Château de Plessis-lèz-Tours (French pronunciation: [ʃato də plɛsi le tuʁ]) is the remains of a late Gothic château located in the town of La Riche in the Indre-et-Loire department, in the Loire Valley of France. Around three quarters of the former royal residence were pulled down during the French Revolution in 1796.

Plessis-lèz-Tours was the favorite residence of King Louis XI of France, who died there on 30 August 1483. It was also the scene of the 1589 meeting between King Henry III of France and the future King Henry IV of France which resulted in their alliance against the Catholic League.

The present building is only a small part of the château originally built by Louis XI in the 15th century. The original château had three wings in the shape of a U. The room where Louis XI died can be visited. It has late 15th-century wooden linenfold panelling. The first floor has paintings and sculpture devoted to St. Francis of Paola, whom Louis XI summoned to live near him until his death. Inside the château is a display of iron cages which were suspended from the ceiling and used to hold prisoners. The cages were so small that the prisoners were unable to stand.

The remaining wing, which had long been used as a dairy farm and a buckshot factory, has been listed as a monument historique since 1927 by the French Ministry of Culture.

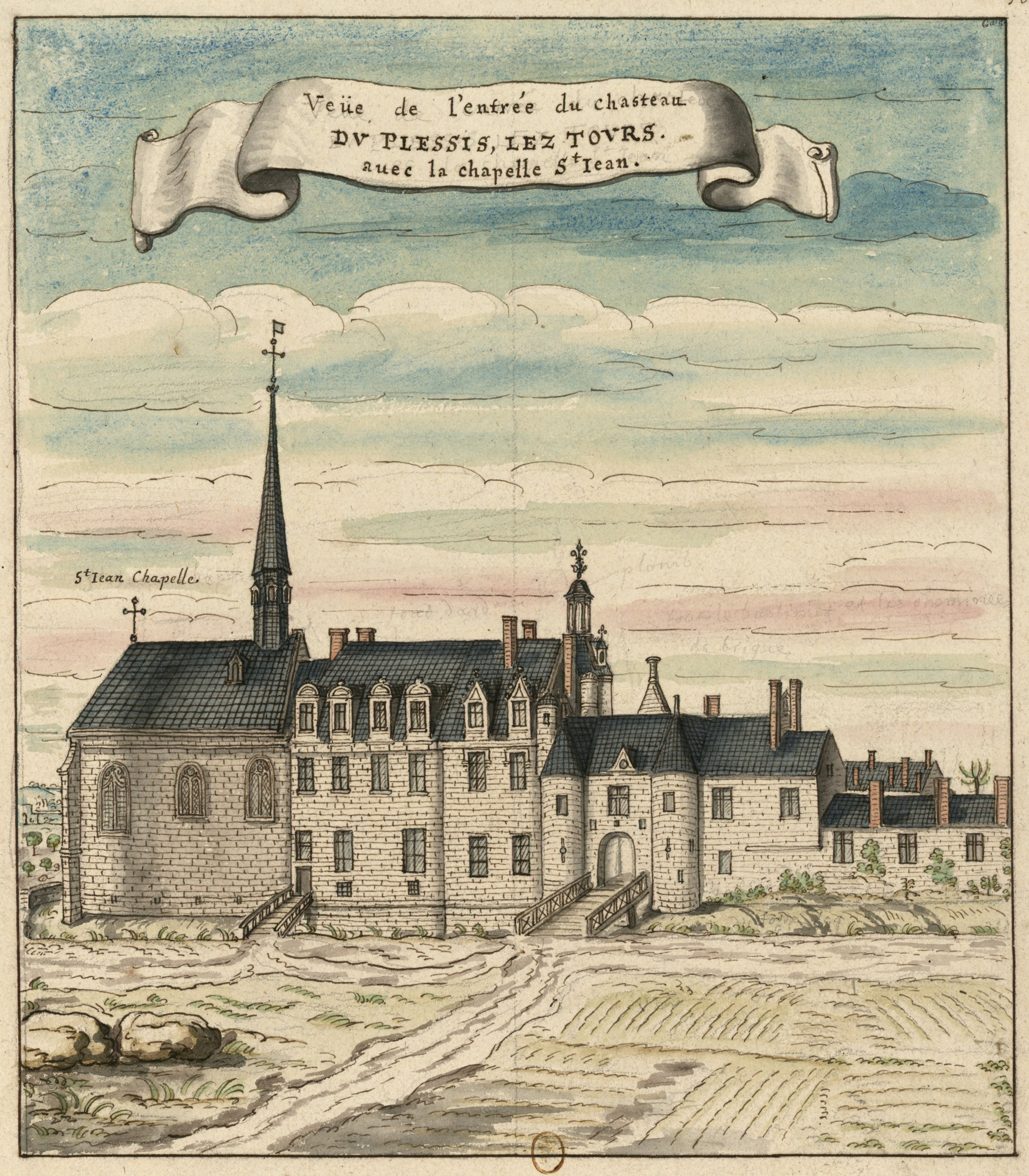
Château de Plessis-lez-Tours.

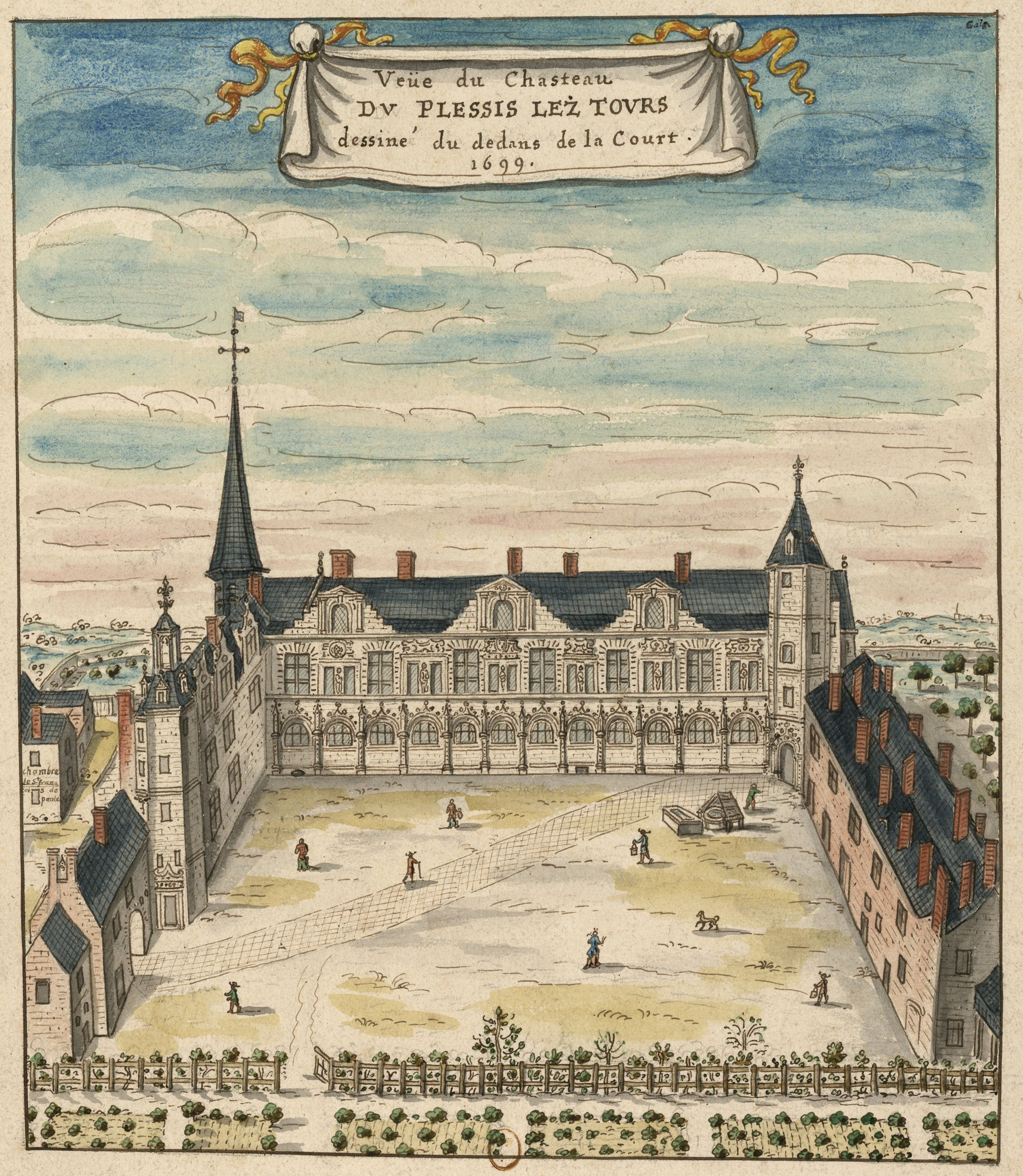
View of the Royal Château de Plessis-lèz-Tours three wings in 1699

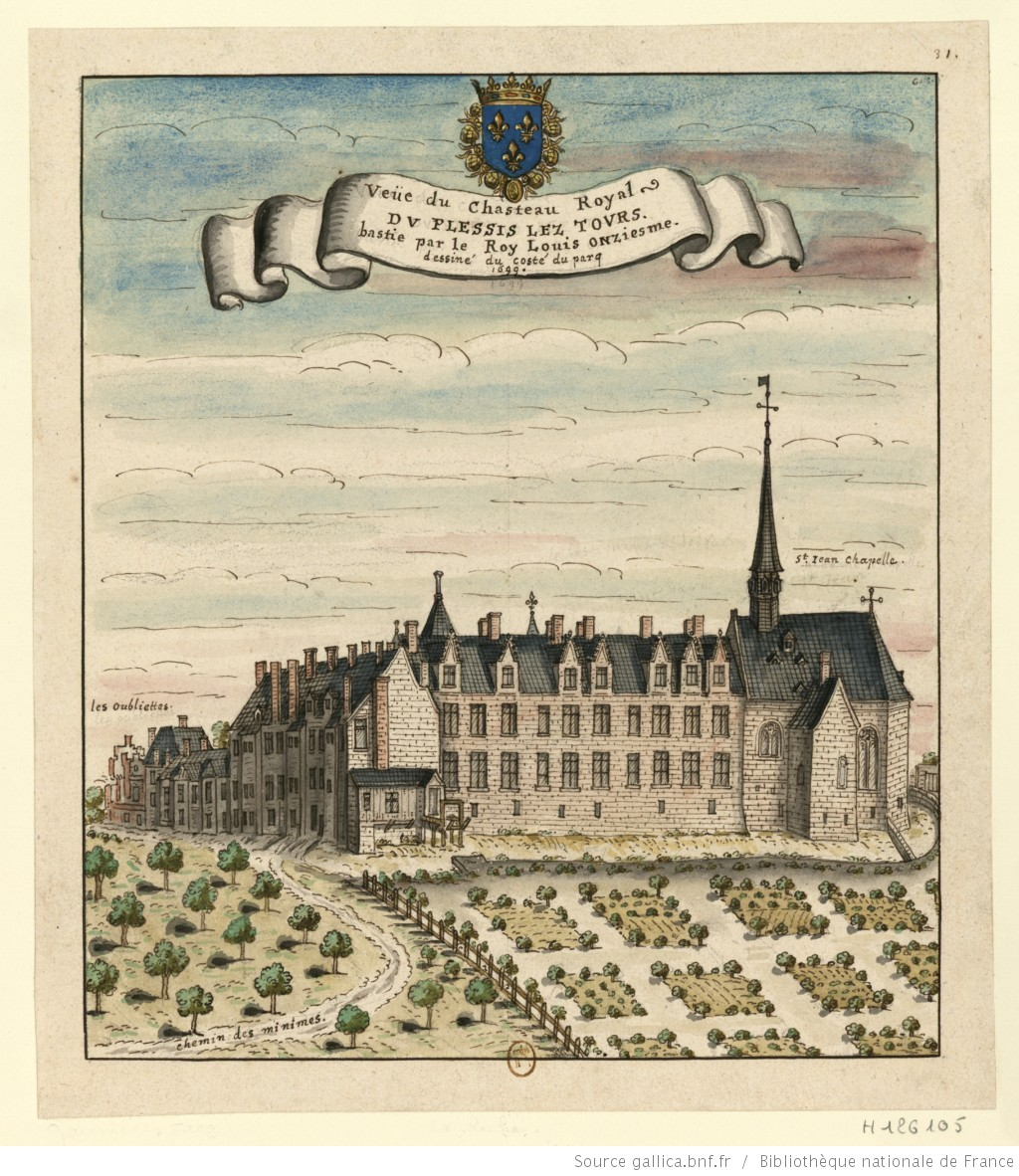
View of the Royal Château de Plessis-lèz-Tours from the park

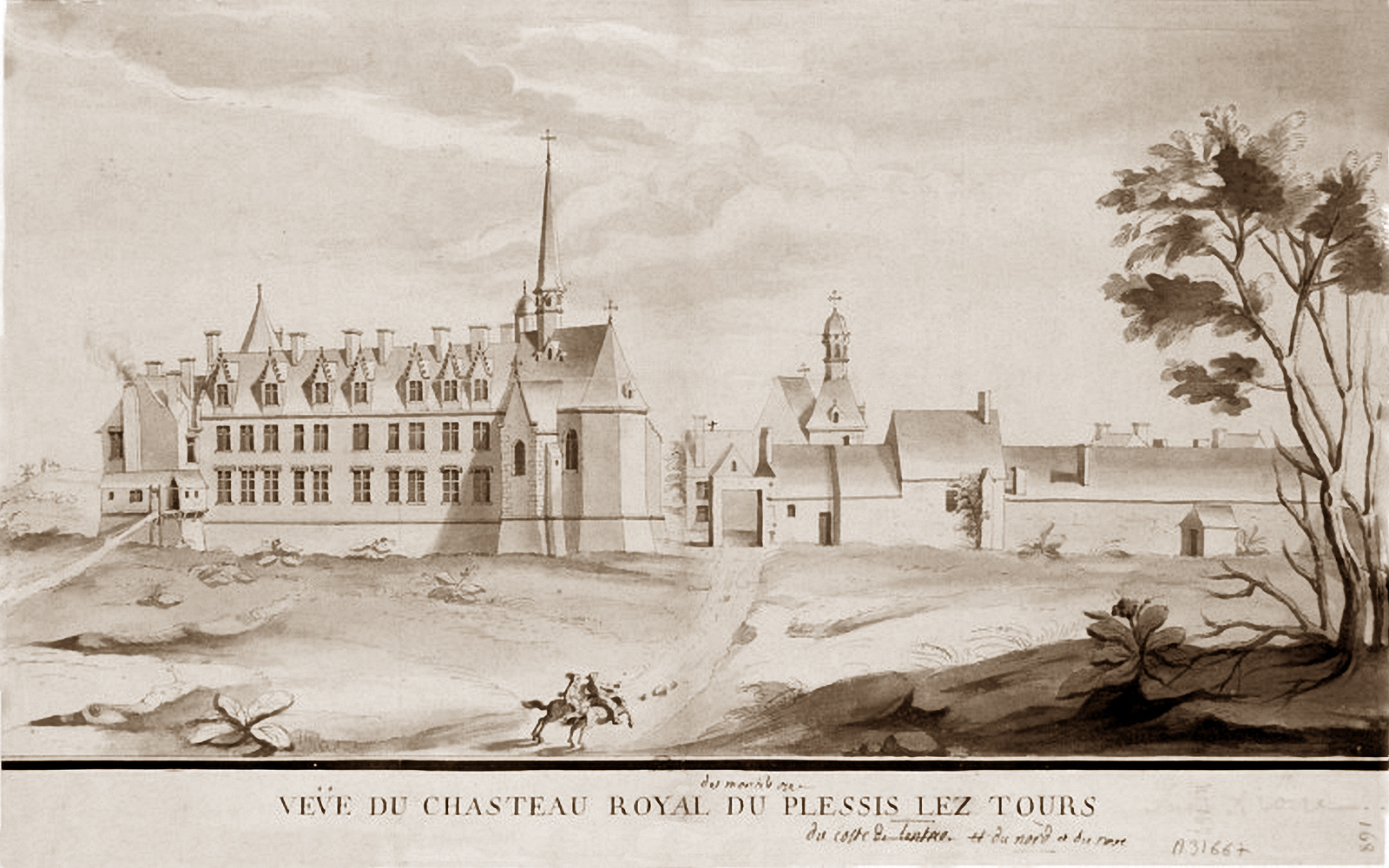
Chateau de Plessis-les-Tours 17th century

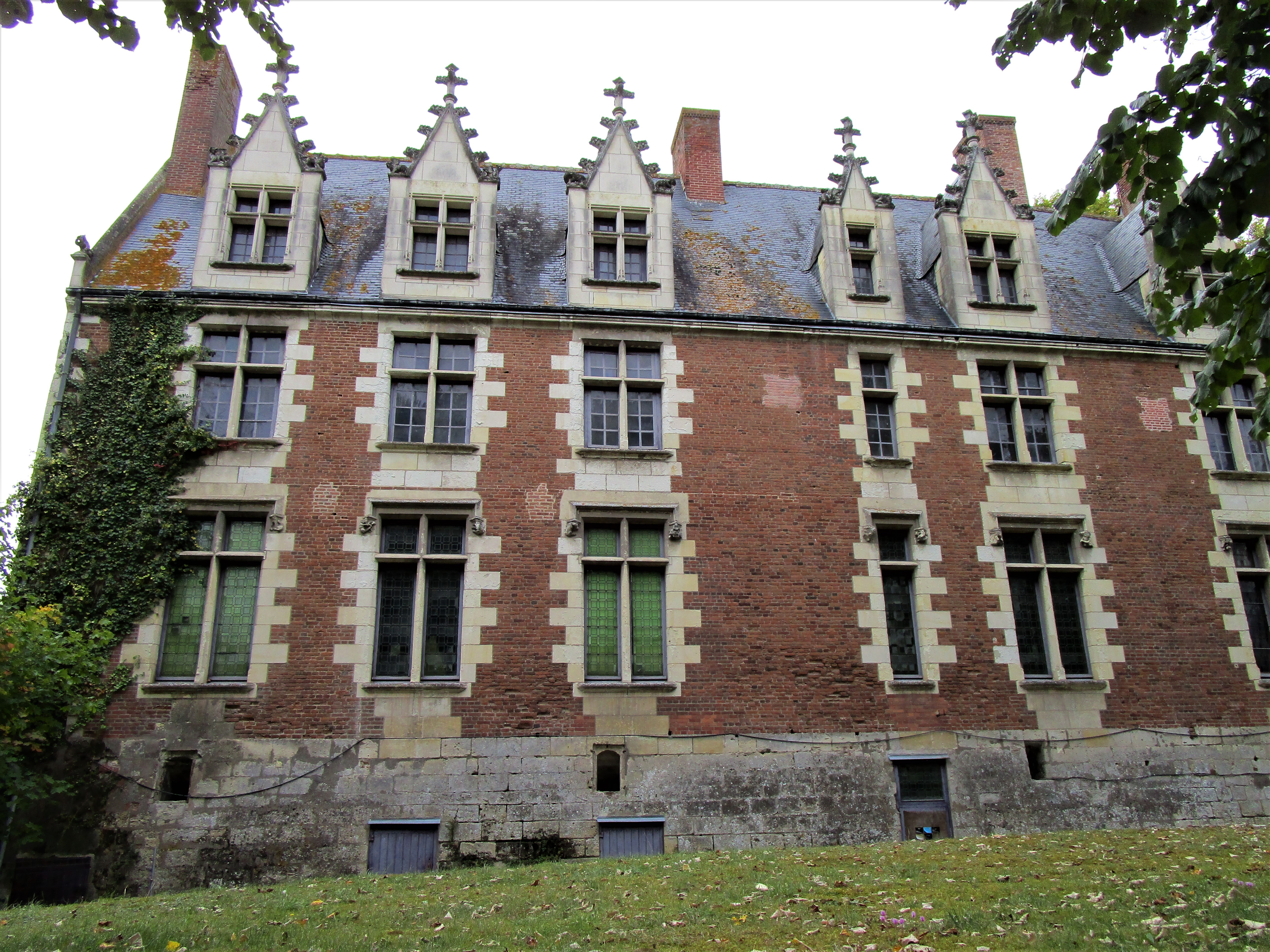
The remaining wing of the château (eastern façade)

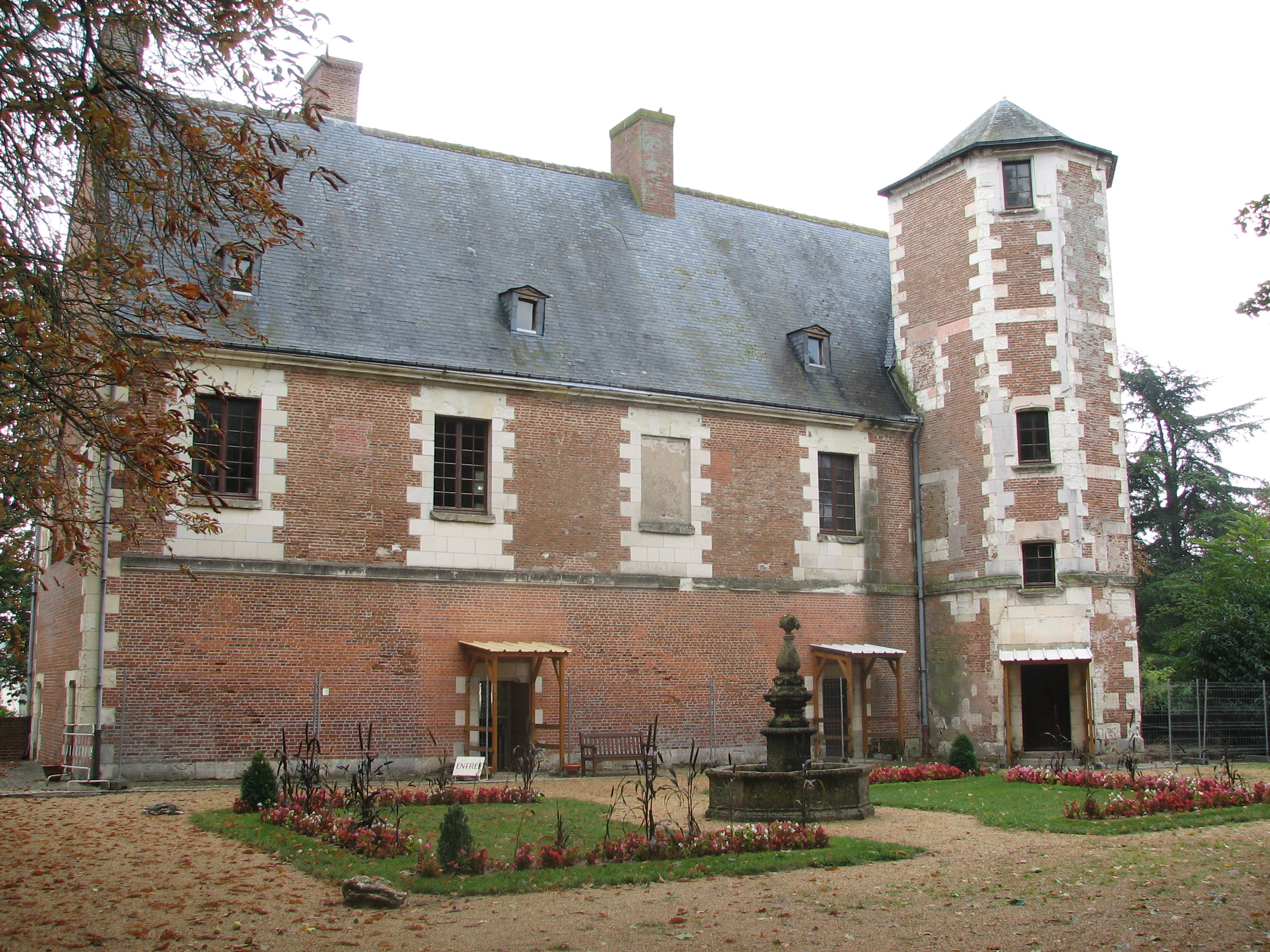
The remaining wing of the château (western façade)
