= Fontenay aqueduct =

Roman aqueduct in France

- Aqueduc de Fontenay
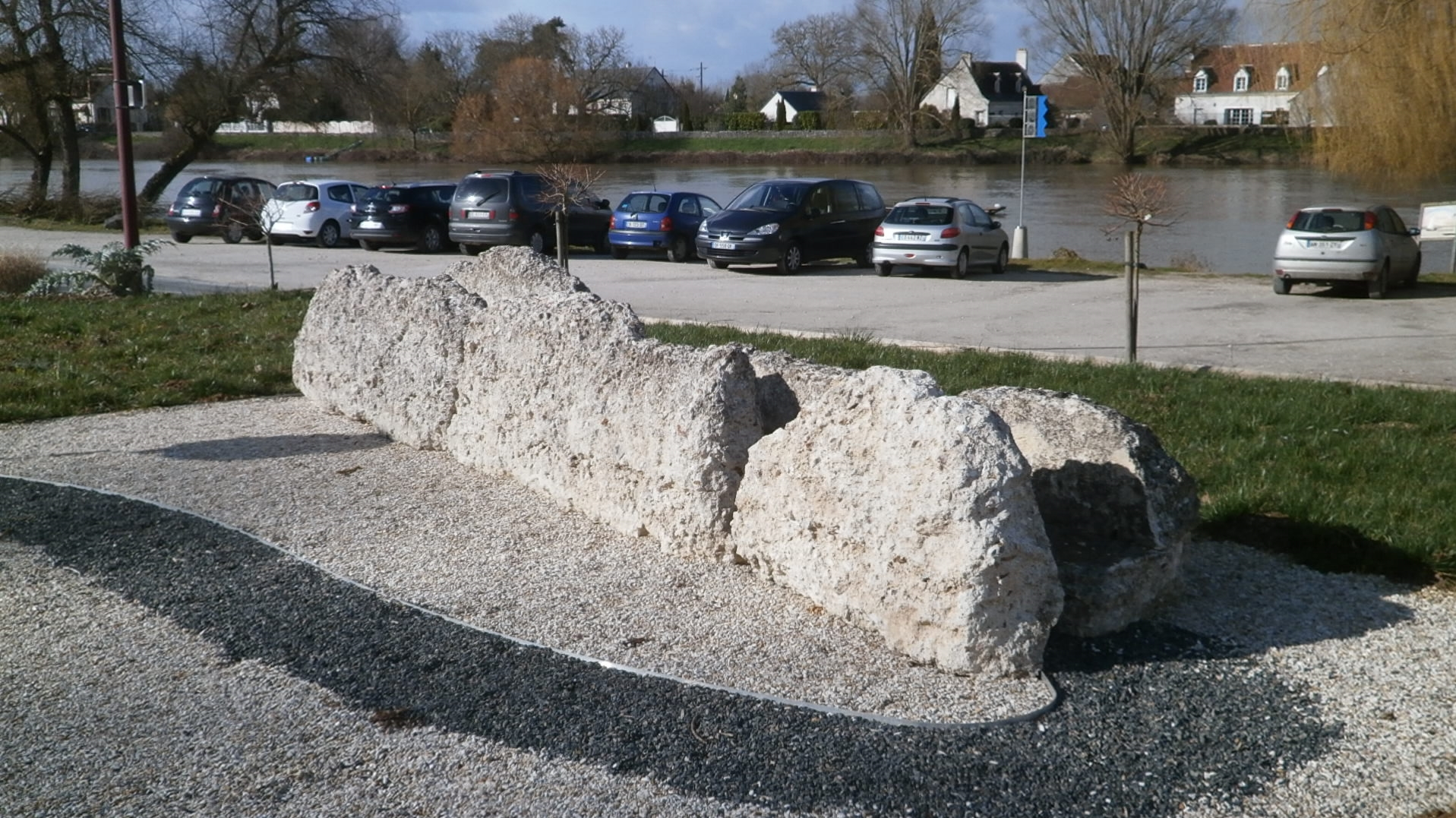
- Remains of the aqueduct at Véretz.
- Interactive map of Fontenay aqueduct
- Type: Aqueduct
- Location: Centre-Val de Loire, France

The Fontenay aqueduct, also known as Aqueduc du Cher, is a largely underground aqueduct that helped supply water to the ancient city of Caesarodunum (now Tours), alongside springs, wells, and another intramural aqueduct. It owes its most common name to a locality near Bléré, where its starting point was located, some 25 kilometers east-southeast of Tours, close to a main spring; the water table from which it springs is still exploited in the 21st century. The aqueduct was also fed by several smaller springs along the way.

The aqueduct's route followed the Cher valley along its left bank, totally or partially embedded in the limestone hillside, except a few engineering structures required to cross valleys, almost in a straight line between Bléré and Saint-Avertin, a commune bordering Tours from which it is separated by the Cher. Although a large part of its route is attested, it has not been possible to identify its course beyond Saint-Avertin, in an area that has been profoundly altered by urbanization, which still casts doubt on its final destination and even on the premature interruption of its construction.

It was built during the Early Roman Empire, probably in the 1st century AD, at the same time as the main public monuments of Caesarodunum. It underwent regular maintenance and repairs until it was abandoned at an uncertain time that seems to predate the High Middle Ages. Only a few easily accessible remains remain, such as at the entrance to the Véretz municipal campsite (a section of canal exposed after having been moved) or along a roadside (piers and pipe). In many cases, the aqueduct is only revealed by anomalies in the terrain (elongated slope), which are not very suggestive of its presence. The fragility of the hillside supporting the aqueduct has led to the destruction of a significant proportion of the masonry by landslides. A section of the vaulted canal, cleared of the backfill that covered it, is located on a private estate in the commune of Athée-sur-Cher and is protected as a listed historic monument.

== Water in Caesarodunum ==
=== Importance of the city ===
The ancient city of Caesarodunum covered an area of around 70 hectares, within which the density of urbanization seems to have been greatest on the banks of the Loire but is still very poorly known as of 2015. It therefore seems impossible to estimate the population residing in Caesarodunum during the Early Roman Empire. Archaeologists and historians suggest population densities for cities in Roman Gaul ranging from 150 to 225 inhabitants/ha, and these estimates are uncertain. Most of Gaul's medium-sized cities, including Caesarodunum, had a population of no more than 5,000 to 6,000.

=== Water supply systems ===
Caesarodunum's water supply systems are not well understood. In the 19th century the existence of the Fontenay aqueduct and its ancient origins were known, but the hypothesis that it could have supplied water to Caesarodunum was rejected by some historians as no remains had been found in its terminal section. Other authors, on the other hand, were convinced that the aqueduct did indeed lead to Caesarodunum. Later, in the early 1980s, the presence of individual wells exploiting a shallow water table was revealed, as well as the equipping of rare domus with water collection basins (impluvium).

In 2003, an excavation determined the location of the left bank of the Loire during the Early Roman Empire, and an aqueduct perpendicular to the Loire, heading south and towards the center of the city was discovered, fed by a noria drawing water from the river. The noria seems to have had a relatively short life span, on the order of a few decades in the 1st century; it may have been a source of non-potable water for the town's artisanal activities. However, nothing is known about the water distribution networks inside the city from the aqueducts.

=== Water needs ===
The water supply systems in Caesarodunum were designed to meet the needs of, in descending order of priority, public fountains, public thermal establishments, artisanal activities, and some private residences. This order of priority, apparently very old and widespread in the Roman Empire, was taken up by Agrippa and then cited by Frontin; it is attested by the archaeological remains of Pompeii and Nemausus (now Nîmes). Only two public thermal establishments, a few domus equipped with private baths, and probable craft activities are attested. This very fragmented view makes it impossible to estimate the city's water requirements, as the variability is already very great for cities much better known than Caesarodunum: an inhabitant of ancient Rome had at his disposal around 1,100 liters per day, while that of Pompeii was half that amount. By way of comparison, the water requirements of a modern city, taking all public and private uses into account, are around 400 liters per inhabitant per day.

== Architecture and layout ==
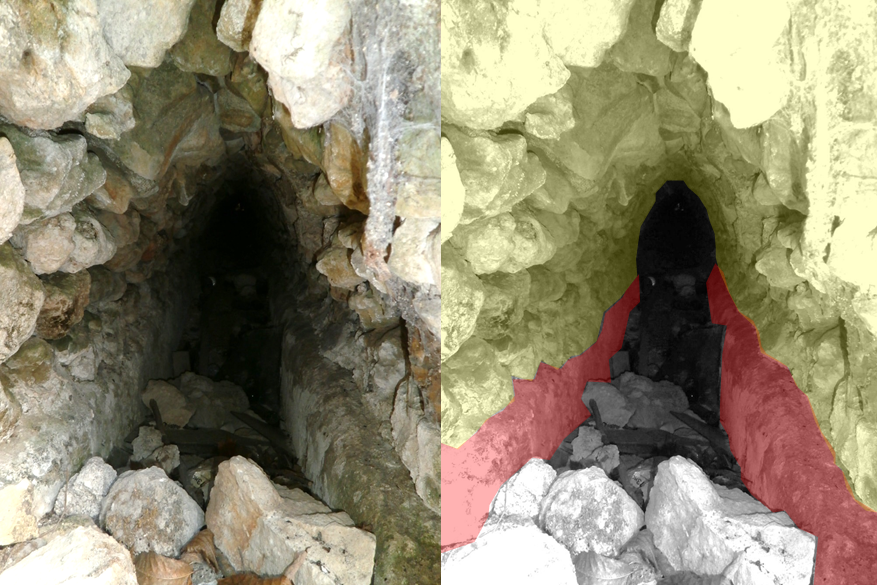
Figure 1: Cross-section of the aqueduct canal. Red: mortar pedestals. Yellow: masonry vault. Grey: fallen arch stones.

=== Construction techniques ===
==== Canal ====
The aqueduct is usually buried on the hillside on the left bank of the Cher. A trench is dug into the slope, after leveling the ground over a width corresponding to the aqueduct's right-of-way (phases 1 and 2). A layer of clay mixed with gravel, designed to level the bottom of the trench, is then deposited at the bottom of the trench (phase 3). The mortar invert is then shaped and leveled at the bottom of the trench; it temporarily supports a formwork of planks used to cast the aqueduct's pedestals (side walls), also built in mortar (phase 4). A vault of limestone or siliceous stone, cemented with lime mortar, probably mounted on a temporary longitudinal truss in the shape of an inverted "V", caps the canal; the same mortar is also applied to the inside and outside of the vault (phase 5). The trench is then backfilled until the aqueduct vault is completely or partially concealed (phase 6). At the time the canal was built, no waterproof mortar was used on the inside of the invert and pedestals, as the rapid development of limestone concretions seems to have taken its place; the waterproof tile mortar (opus signinum) that covers the walls and invert on certain sections was applied during a repair campaign. The canal (or specus) is approximately 0.50 m wide and 0.60 m high, with an arch height of 1.30 m; these are average dimensions, but they vary little along the aqueduct's length.

Figure 2: Construction phases of the Fontenay aqueduct. Schematic cross-sections

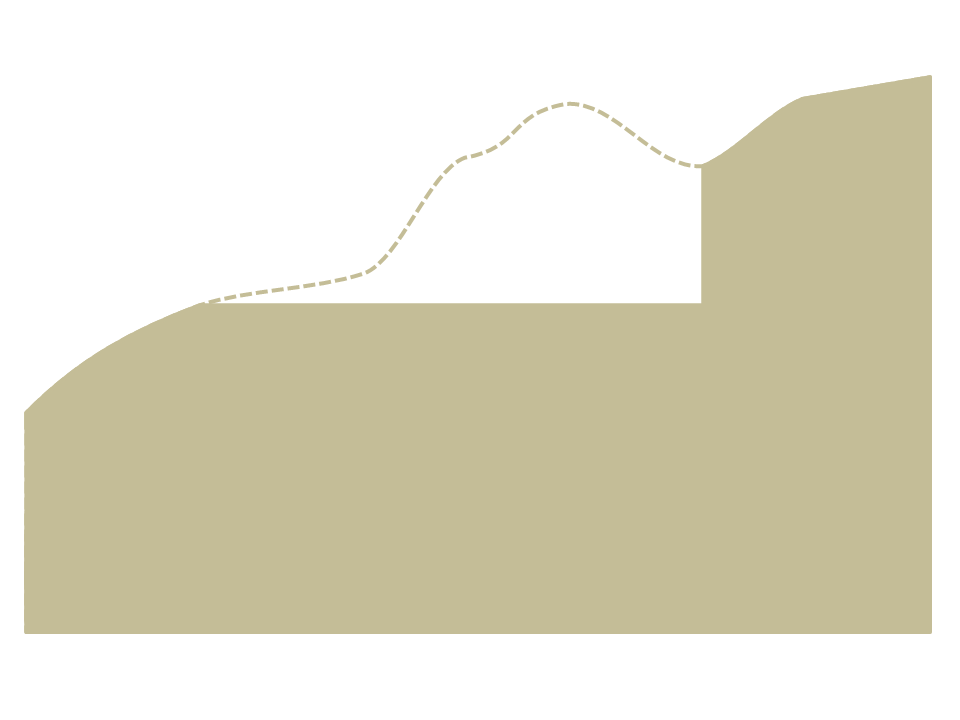
1: levelling the right-of-way.

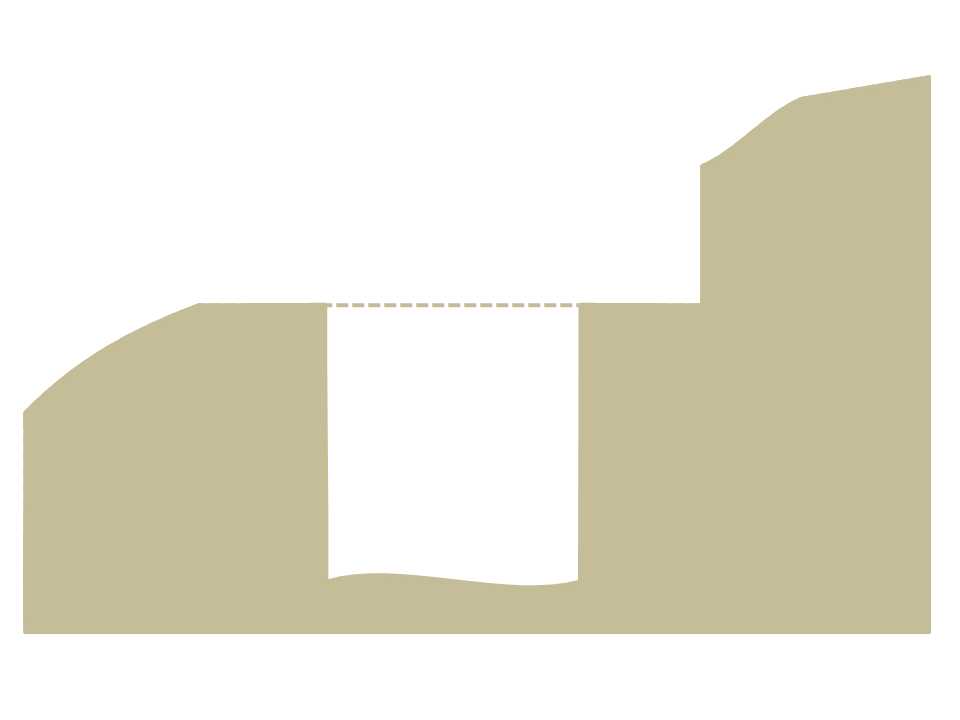
2: trench excavation.

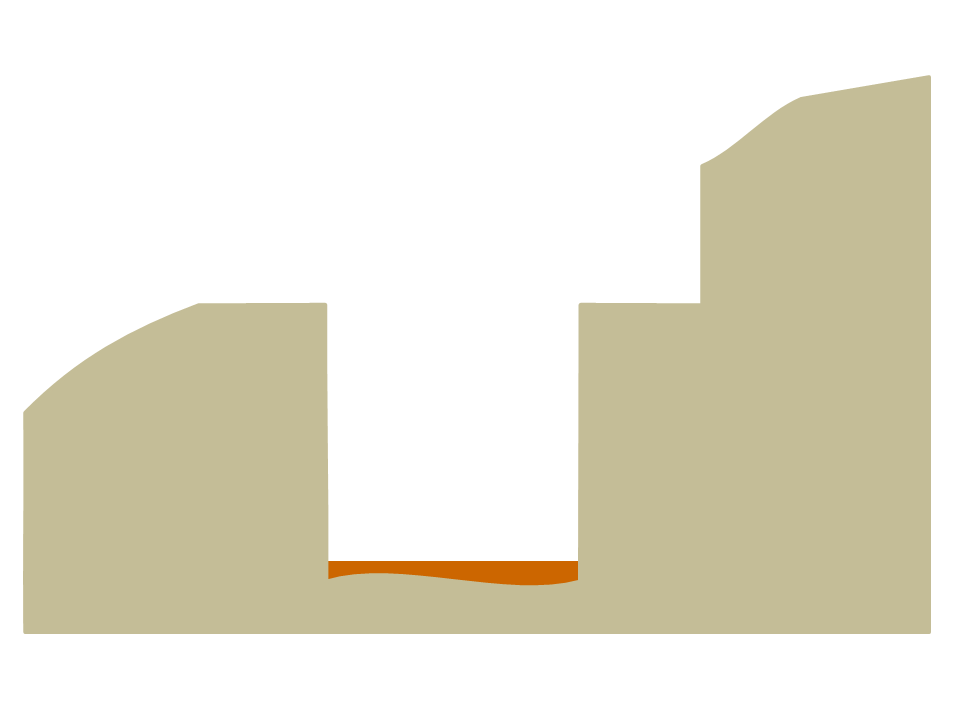
3: Levelling the trench bottom.

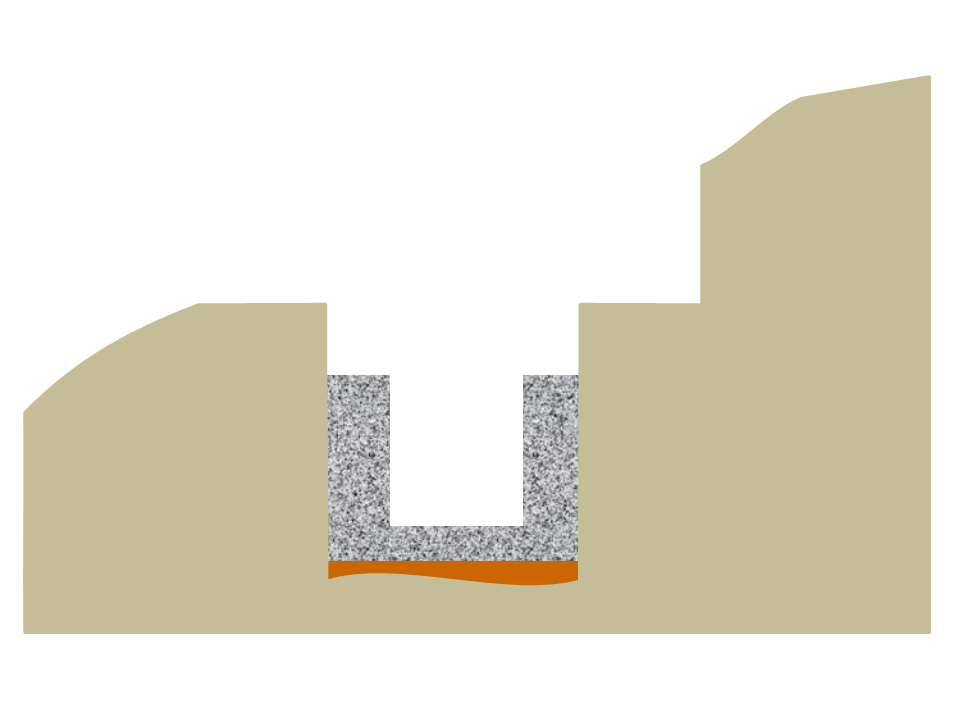
4: pouring the invert and pedestals.

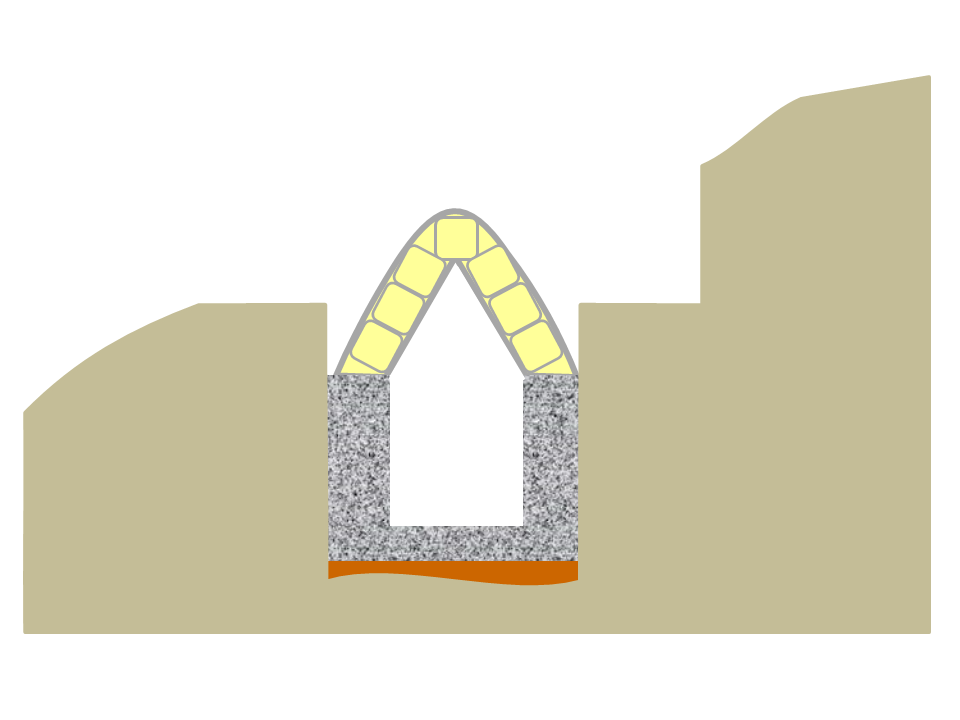
5: Stonework and covering of the vault.

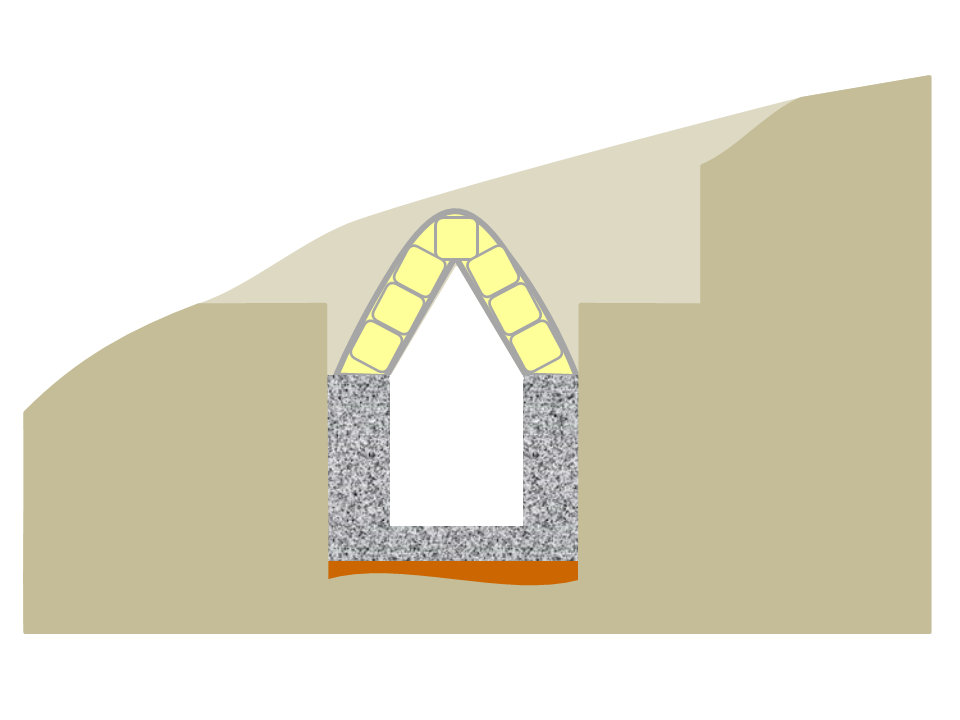
6: trench backfilled.

==== Engineering structures ====
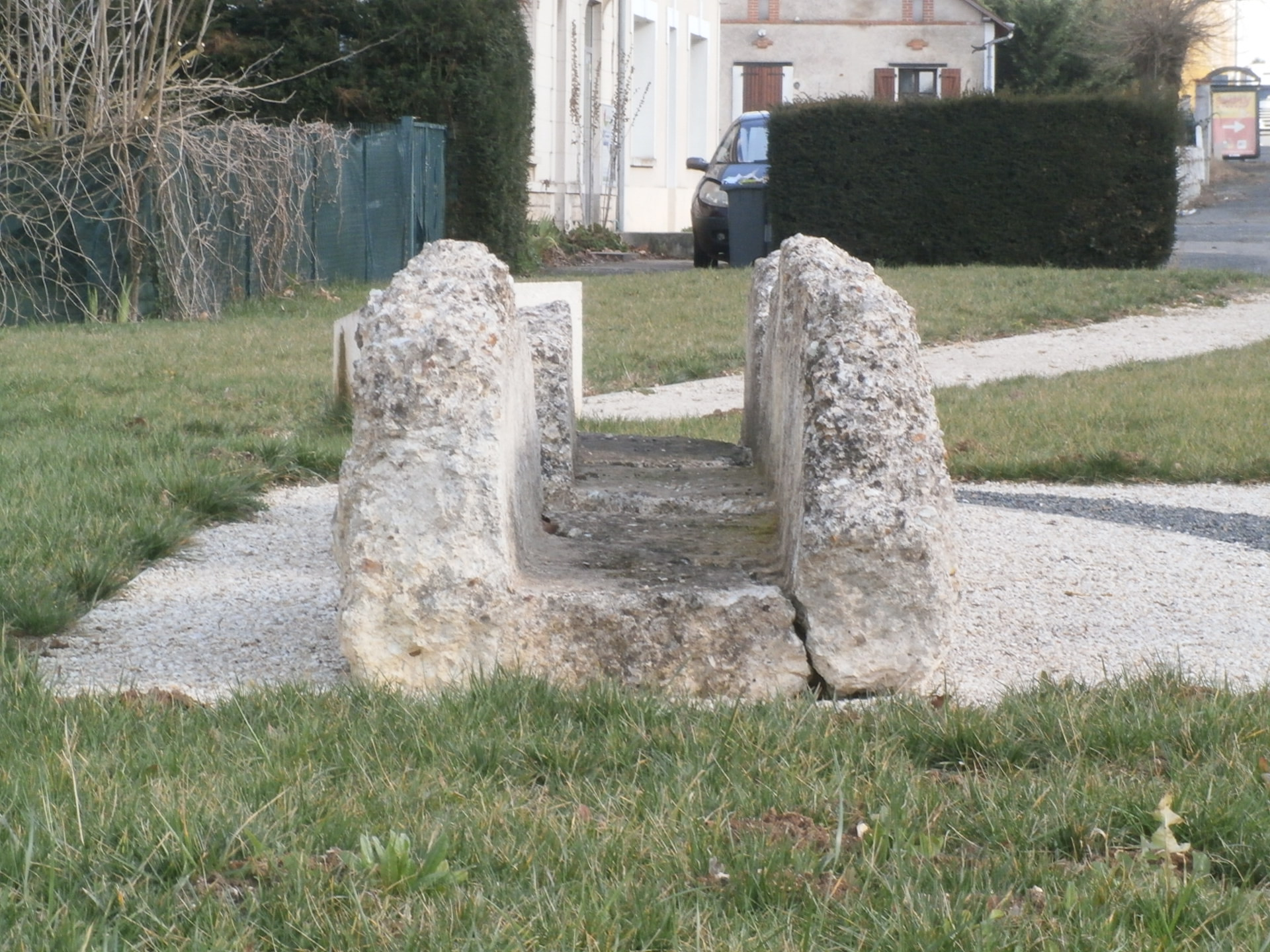
Figure 3: Cross-section of invert and pedestals made of sand and gravel mortar on a dismantled and exposed section of the canal.

At 18 sites along its route the aqueduct is aerial, with the pipes carried for dozens of metres by a continuous wall or by arches supported on piers (pont-aqueduc). Six pont-aqueducs have been documented, the largest being 110 meters long. One load-bearing wall has been identified, 60 meters long. In the last eleven cases, the use of a crossing structure was made compulsory by the local topography, but its nature cannot be specified due to a lack of remains; the longest of these structures crosses the Cher Valley, over a distance of at least 1,000 meters. The state of preservation of the remains does not allow us to describe the canal supported by the bridges or walls, which may have been built on the same model as the buried canal in terms of its invert and pedestals, with a series of stone slabs or tiles replacing the masonry vault in a commonly adopted arrangement. Numerous landslides along the valley sides have certainly buried many bridge remains.

Bridge-aqueduct construction begins with a face of small, regular units with no brick bases (opus vittatum), enclosing a blocking core of stones embedded in mortar (opus caementicium). In some places, a layer of mortar covers the whole, but the masons took care to draw patterns on its surface simulating a masonry unit. In a second phase, perhaps in the second or third century, the intrados of the vaults were strengthened by the veneering of a second, lowered vault in the masonry, using terracotta elements. At the same time, some piers were fitted with buttresses; others were completely rebuilt, perhaps following the collapse of a first bridge undermined by leaking water from the aqueduct.

The remains of three piers (photos of piers 1 to 3 in figure 4) remain in the Chandon valley (Athée-sur-Cher). By measuring the distance between these piers, Cyril Driard was able to calculate the span of the arches of the bridge-aqueduct that crossed this valley over a length of around 60 meters, and to propose a restitution (photo 4 in figure 4). The attested location of a recently lost fourth pier confirms these calculations. The height of the bridge was estimated based on the altitude of the canal remains upstream and downstream of the valley.

Figure 4: The Chandon aqueduct bridge. Remains and proposed restoration

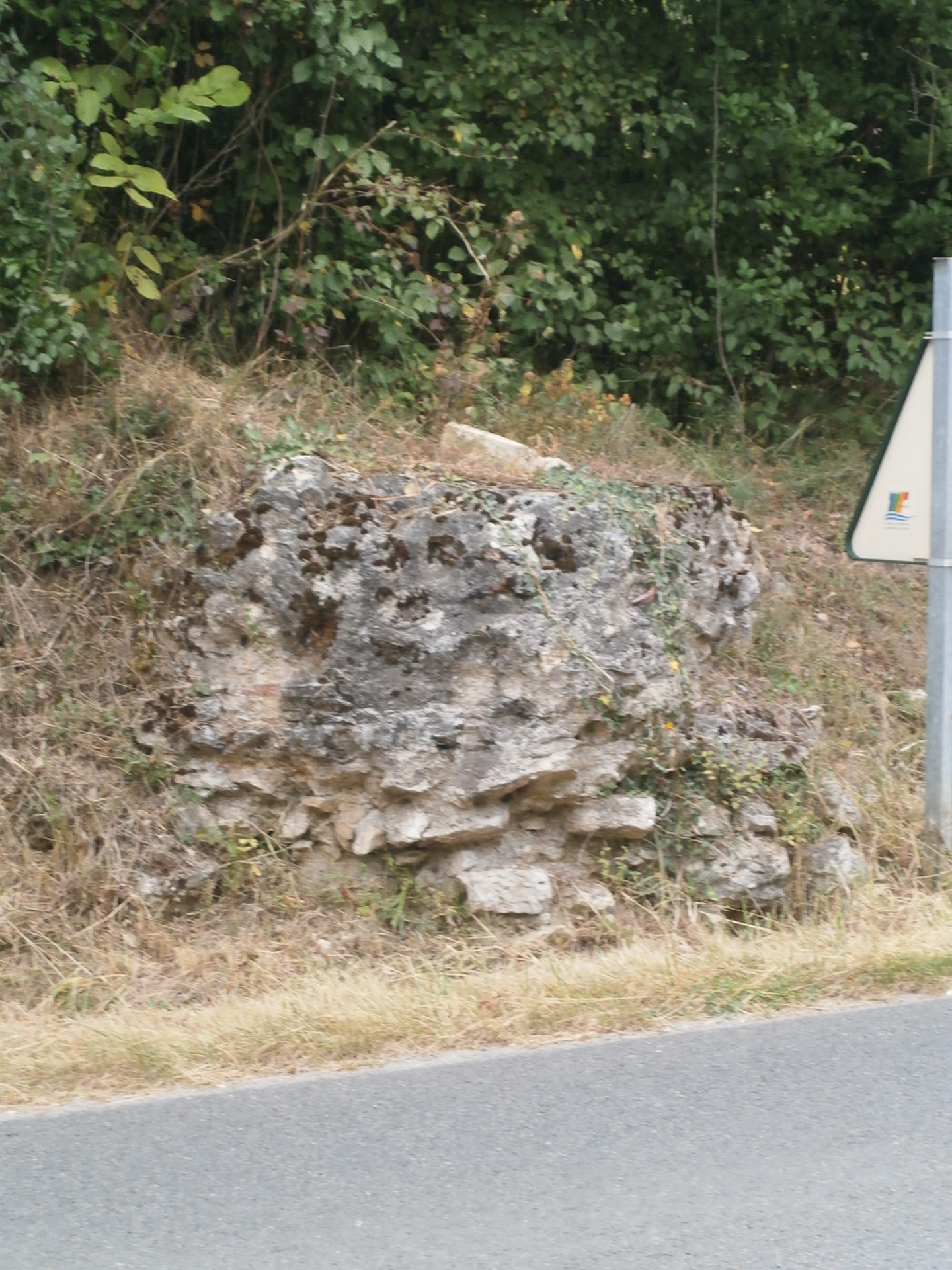
Remains of pier 1.

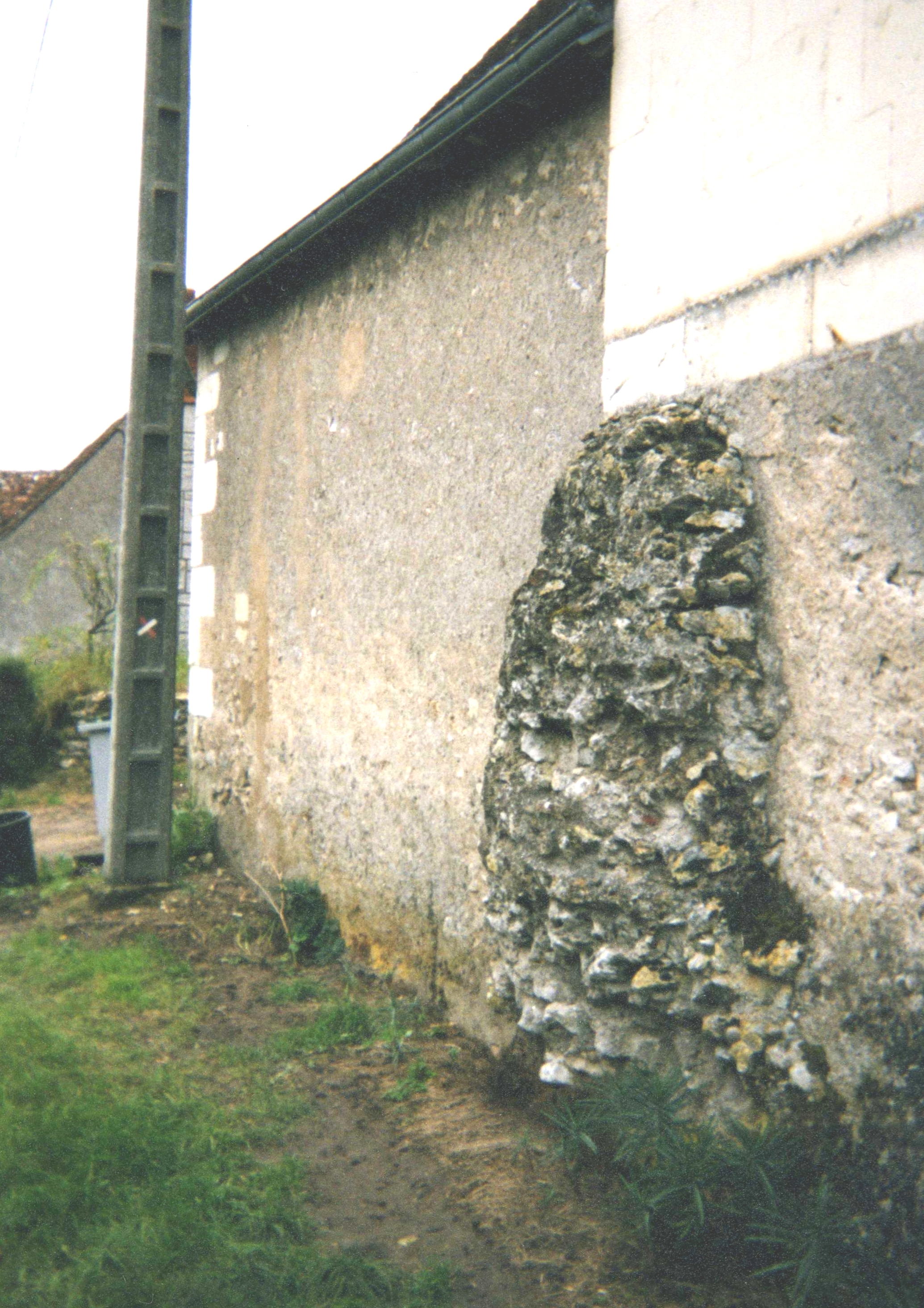
Remains of pier 2.

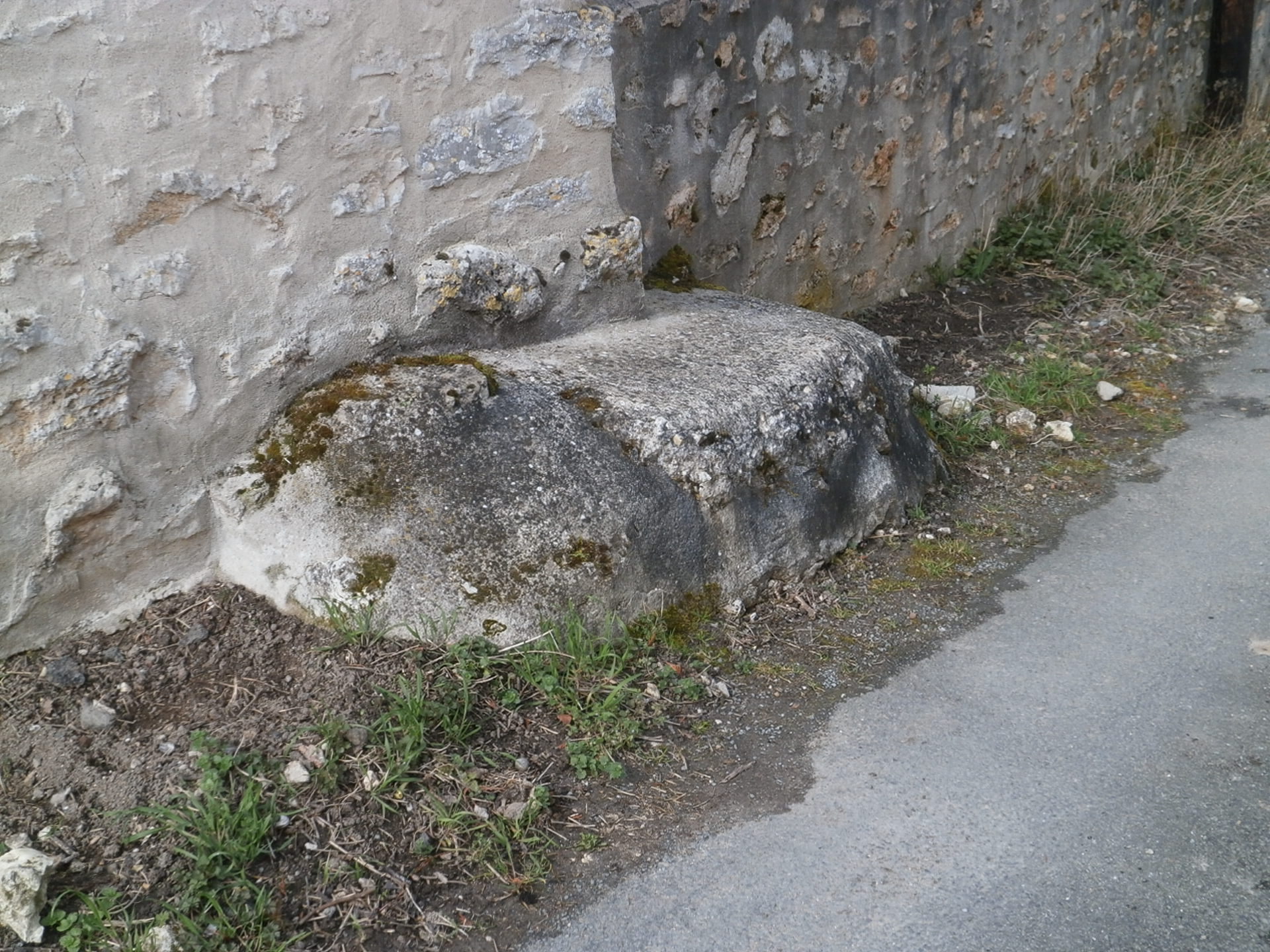
Remains of pier 3.

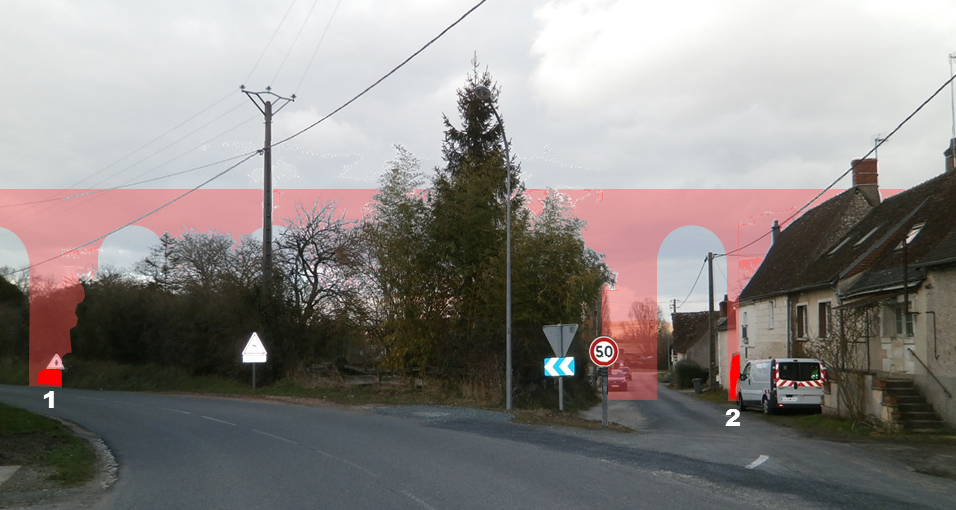
Proposed restitution of the aqueduct-bridge. View to the north.

==== Building materials and construction time ====
All the materials used to build the aqueduct could be found or produced on site. Sand and gravel used to make mortar were most likely taken from the Cher riverbed. The limestone and masonry flints used for the engineering structures and the canal vault were extracted from the hillside, which also provided the basic material for the manufacture of lime, certainly produced in small kilns close to the current construction site. The quantity of materials required for the construction of the canal alone, over the recognized length of the aqueduct, is estimated at 20,000 cubic meters of mortar and 12,500 cubic meters of stone; a similar estimate cannot be made for the engineering structures, due to the fragmentary nature of their remains. The duration of the work, impossible to specify in the absence of data on the number of workers involved, must have been no less than one year.

==== Aqueduct gradient and flow rate ====
Over its entire recognized route, the aqueduct has an average gradient of 1.17 m/km, varying from 0.50 to 4.40 m/km, giving a total difference in gradient of around 25 meters. These values are not exceptional: parts of the Nîmes aqueduct have a gradient of only 6.59 cm/km, while the Yzeron aqueduct has a gradient of 16.8 m/km. The slope estimate made in 2003 differs from the data obtained in previous studies, which only provided values for sections of the aqueduct. The estimated flow rate of the aqueduct varies between 2,300 and 5,400 m3/day, or 27 l/s to 62 l/s, below Caesarodunum's daily requirements; the flow rate is estimated using Bazin's formula, taking into account the average slope of the aqueduct channel, its cross-section and the traces left on its walls (either in relief due to the accumulation of deposits, or in hollows due to water erosion at the rare bends), which allow us to appreciate the water level in the channel.

=== Route ===
The route of the aqueduct has been identified in six communes on the left bank of the Cher, successively and from east to west, following the slope of the aqueduct: Bléré, Athée-sur-Cher, Azay-sur-Cher, Véretz, Larçay, and Saint-Avertin. The sites where the aqueduct has been identified since the mid-nineteenth century, even if some have been the subject of works leading to the destruction of the remains or have been swept away by natural landslides on the hillside, are sufficiently numerous and geographically close to one another that a large part of the aqueduct's route can be established with a fair degree of precision. Some oral traditions, such as the claim that a castle tower was built on the site of an aqueduct pier, have not been verified.

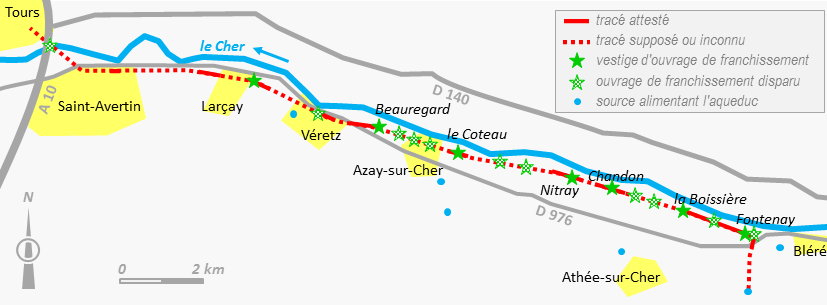
Figure 5: Schematic layout of the Fontenay aqueduct on a modern map.

For the distance between Bléré and Saint-Avertin, the course of the Cher is fairly straight, and the hillside on its left bank is not very winding either. The aqueduct therefore follows a fairly straight line, with no major irregularities, except when, to cross a valley that was not strictly perpendicular to it, its course was bent to minimize masonry work. Other exceptions include the upstream part of the aqueduct, in the area of its most important catchments, and probably the downstream part in the as yet unrecognized crossing of the Cher Valley. This hillside construction technique also made it easier to enforce the prohibition on any construction or planting on either side of the aqueduct over a width of five to fifteen feet (1.50 to 4.50 meters), to avoid damaging it, in the application of the Quinctia law of 9 BC, cited by Frontinus in his work Des aqueducs de la ville de Rome.

==== Captured springs ====
A spring from the aforementioned lacustrine limestone water table can be found at Les Grandes Fontaines in Bléré. In ancient times, a series of draining galleries collected the water from this aquifer and conveyed it to a masonry basin, probably used for decanting, the easternmost point of the aqueduct; in the 21st century, a borehole drilled near the spring tapped the same aquifer to supply water to Bléré and nearby communes, and the basin was destroyed by the work associated with this borehole. Measurements carried out in the 21st century and provided its characteristics have not changed over the last 2,000 years, show that its flow is well in excess of requirements (withdrawals constitute only 20% of the annual renewable reserve), and its mineralogical quality is very satisfactory, two criteria that do not seem to be met jointly for other springs that could have supplied the town. The aqueduct canal follows the slope of a valley northwards to the edge of the Cher. Another spring, Fontaine-Saint-Martin, located further to the northeast, also feeds the aqueduct, and joins the first one not far from Fontenay after flowing north and then west. The toponym Fontenay derives from the Latin fons (spring, fountain), with the addition of the suffix -etum (which gave rise to the modern ending ay) introducing a collective meaning; Fontenay means springs.

In Athée-sur-Cher, several small springs have joined together to form a stream, which now flows into the Cher near La Boulaye. In ancient times, they were probably channelled into the aqueduct, even if the pipes that channelled them have never been found.

In Azay-sur-Cher, the Gitonnière stream and the Saint-Aoustrille fountain, located at the entrance to the town, were also used to supply the aqueduct.

To the west of Véretz town center, a water table fed by percolating water from the Larçay forest, on the hillside overlooking Véretz, and whose outlets have been tapped, certainly contributed to the supply of the aqueduct.

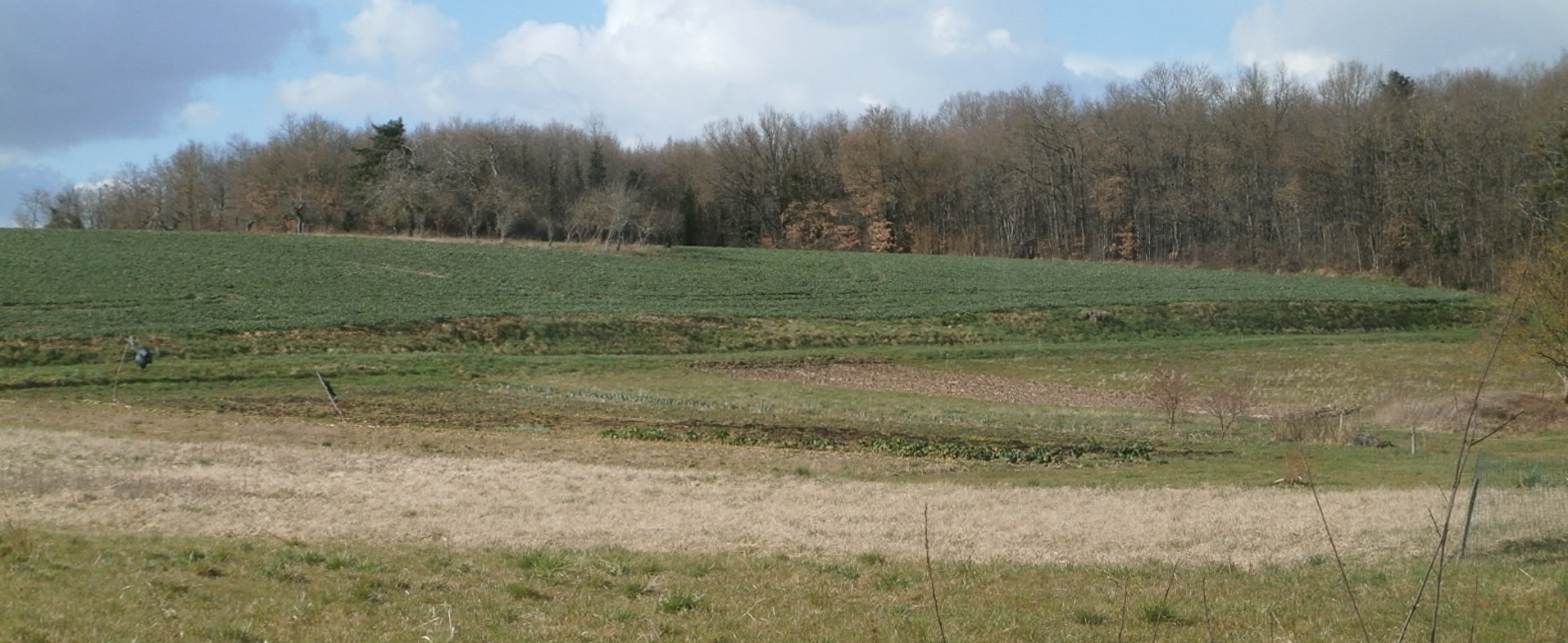
Figure 6: The Fontenay aqueduct near the main spring. Its presence is revealed by a linear relief anomaly.

==== The aqueduct on the banks of the Cher ====
In the commune of Bléré, starting from the masonry basin collecting water from the Grandes Fontaines springs, the aqueduct runs down the western slope of the Fontenay valley towards the Cher; it was here that water supply works in 1968, followed by an operation to clear a pond in 1981, enabled us to identify part of its route. At the bottom of the valley, the aqueduct canal bends slightly westwards towards Tours; it is at this point, to the east of the Château de Fontenay, that it receives water from the Fontaines Saint-Martin spring. After crossing the Fontenay valley on a bridge in the château grounds, it then cuts into the chalky hillside on the left bank of the Cher.

In the Athée-sur-Cher area, the aqueduct is either buried or overhead as it crosses the valleys of the streams flowing into the Cher after cutting into the hillside. The aqueduct has been identified at La Boulaye, but has been destroyed, as well as at La Boissière and Chandon, where remains remain. It was then observed at Nitray but, to the west of this locality, its trace is lost over a length of 600 meters.

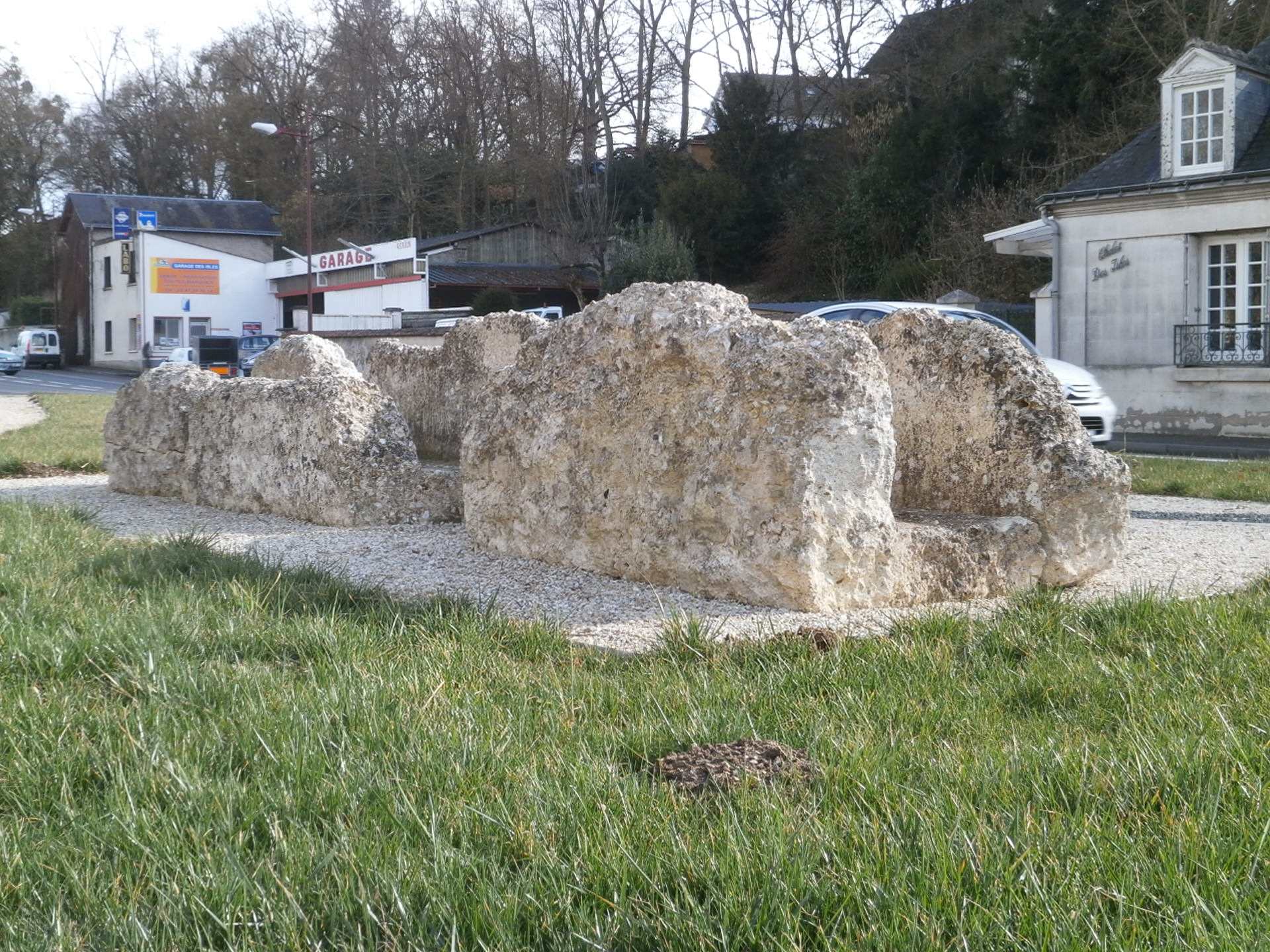
Figure 7: Remains of the aqueduct on display at Véretz. The construction of the car garage visible in the background led to the dismantling of the remains, which were moved a few meters.

The Fontenay aqueduct has been identified at several points in Azay-sur-Cher: in the parks of the Châteaux de Leugny and Coteau, where the most imposing aerial remains remain, and along the hillside, even if segments were destroyed when cellars were dug, as well as near the communal washhouse.

The location of the aqueduct is revealed by a linear bulge in the ground in the Beauregard Park to the east of Véretz, sometimes highlighted by a line of scrubby vegetation contrasting with the surrounding fields; the aqueduct then seems to have acted as a dike perpendicular to the slope, retaining the sediment that accumulated against it. The aqueduct was found again shortly before crossing the D976, but construction work dismantled its remains. The construction of houses in the town of Véretz was accompanied by the destruction of part of the aqueduct, which was used as a stone quarry, but the canal remains visible in several places, its masonry exposed by landslides on the hillside. At the western end of the village, the masonry of the aqueduct was used as a lintel or step for cellar access doors at the bottom of an industrial wasteland.

In the Larçay commune, the aqueduct is still partly embedded in the hillside. The cross-section of the canal has been seen at two different locations, to the east (at the bottom of a parking lot, where it is approximately 1 m above modern ground level) and to the west of the town at the mouth of the Placier valley, where it was visible for a length of 50 meters in the early 1960s. West of this point, the route of the aqueduct is unknown until Saint-Avertin.

In Saint-Avertin, at a place called l'Écorcheveau, the aqueduct is the furthest downstream of its route; it was probably cut when the hillside was excavated to build the N76 (now the D976) at the end of the eighteenth century. At this point, the aqueduct was still oriented east-west, and its course did not bend to the northwest and Tours across the Cher plain.

==== Crossing the Cher: an unknown ====
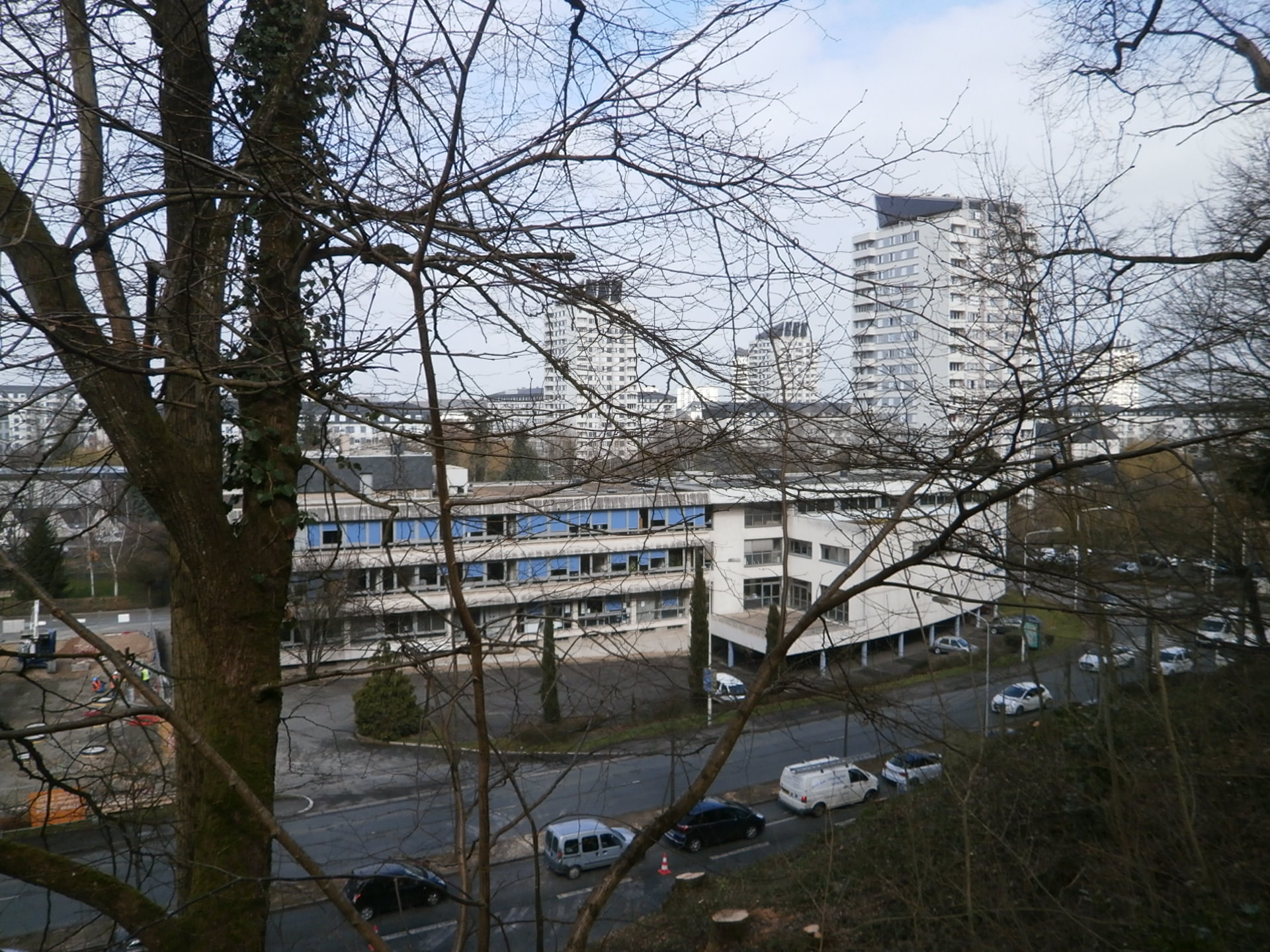
Figure 8: The Fontaines district in Tours (partial view); the aqueduct probably crossed this alluvial plain, which is now urbanized.

Beyond l'Écorcheveau in Saint-Avertin, the route of the aqueduct has not been determined, and its final destination has not been formally established. At this stage of archaeological knowledge, three hypotheses are possible:

1. the aqueduct continued beyond Saint-Avertin, into the Cher Valley, on its left bank, towards an unknown destination. This first hypothesis seems unlikely, as no ancient settlement has been discovered downstream that would justify a water supply system on this scale;
2. the end point of the aqueduct was Saint-Avertin, in which case it served the many ancient villas along its route in the Cher valley. This second hypothesis is also considered implausible: as the aqueduct has been identified along a large part of its route, it would have to be assumed that all the diversions used to supply the villas, which are well located, have disappeared or been ignored; furthermore, its slope seems to have been calculated to end at Tours;
3. the Fontenay aqueduct was indeed intended to supply Caesarodunum, but no remains of the final part of its course have come to light. This third hypothesis is supported by the vast majority of archaeologists and historians. At an undetermined point, the aqueduct turned northwest and crossed the Cher plain via a crossing device which, at the beginning of the 21st century, had not been identified. The major diversion of the Petit Cher and urbanization work south of Tours in the 1960s may have erased part of any traces; however, archaeologists monitored the work but did not detect any remains of a siphon or bridge. Some authors have speculated that, before these upheavals, the aqueduct ran alongside the ancient road from Loches to Tours, some of whose bridges over the Cher at Saint-Avertin have been identified. In the absence of any remains of the aqueduct on this portion of its route, this hypothesis is not supported.

To enable the aqueduct to cross the Cher's major floodplain, three crossing structures are conceivable: a pipe on a dyke seems unlikely, as the dyke would oppose the river's current in the event of high water; a bridge-aqueduct could have been built, but this would have been a large-scale structure; a sub-fluvial siphon seems more plausible, but this hypothesis can in no way be attested.

Within Tours itself, no remains have been found that can be attributed with certainty to this aqueduct.

== Aqueduct chronology ==
The valley on the left bank of the Cher, along which the aqueduct runs, is rich in remains from the ancient period: several enclosures and villas have been identified along the entire route from Bléré to Saint-Avertin; an ancient road (from Bourges to Tours) was established in the alluvial plain on either or both banks of the Cher and three possible milestones have been found. One final factor may explain the importance of the ancient stations in this region: the Cher was most likely navigable, at least between Chabris – Gièvres (50 kilometers upstream from Bléré) and Tours. At the time of the aqueduct's construction, there were no major settlements on or near its route, except for Tours, all foundations being later, as far as can be ascertained from the information available at the beginning of the 21st century; however, a mutatio (truck stop) may have existed at Larçay, along the ancient route.

=== Construction ===
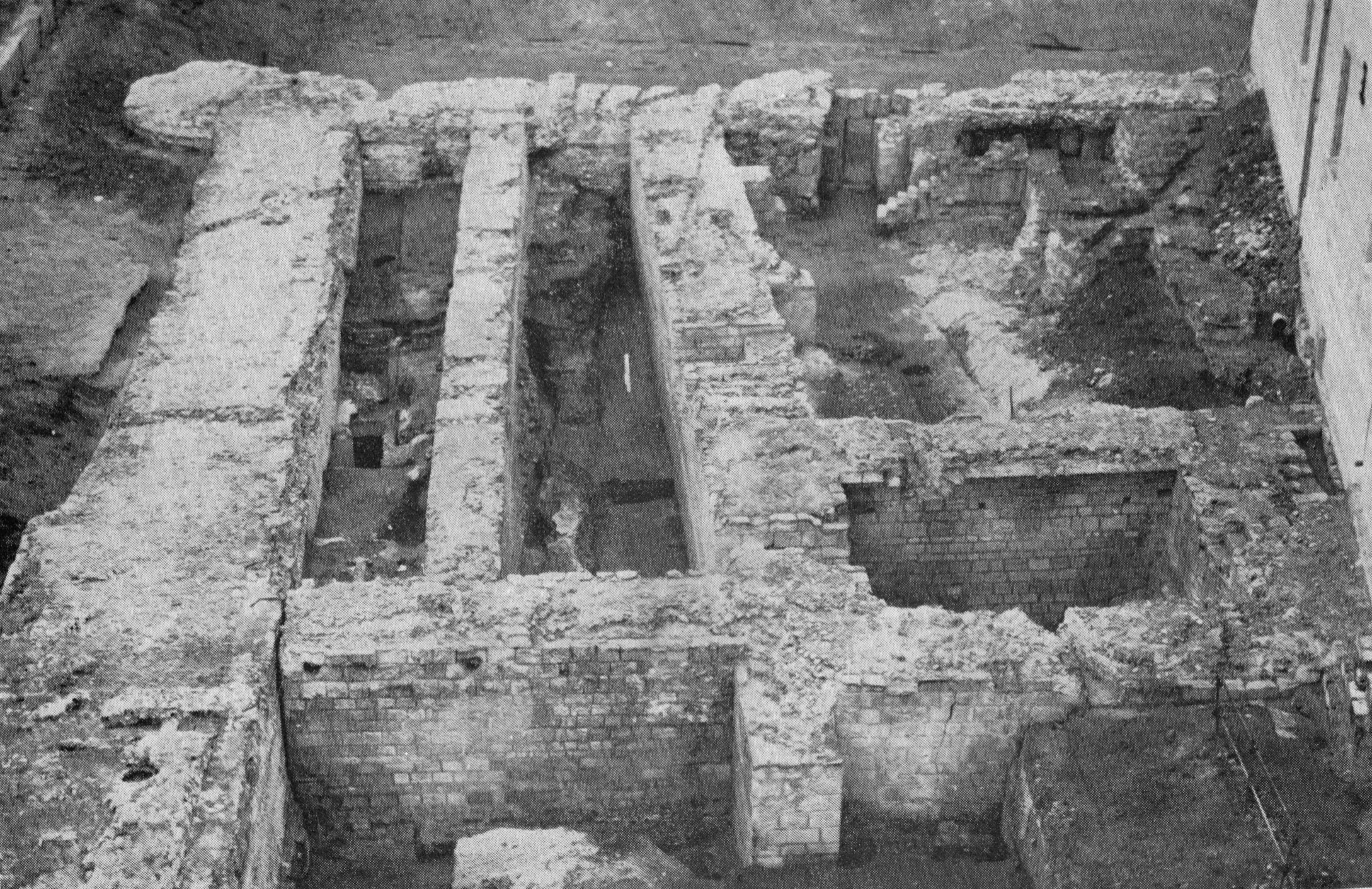
Figure 9: Excavations at the Château de Tours (1977); the eastern baths can be seen at the bottom of the left-hand section of the excavation.

The construction of the aqueduct is not precisely dated in any document. Most authors admit that it was built during the Gallo-Roman period, but without any further precision: "The aqueduct that supplied water in Gallo-Roman times to the agglomeration of Caesarodunum started from Fontenay, a locality to the west of Bléré" or "After the Roman conquest, [...] an aqueduct was built to bring water from Fontenay, near Bléré, to [Tours]". Others, a little more precise in their suggestions, mention the construction of the aqueduct in a book devoted to the history of Tours, within a chapter dedicated to the Early Roman Empire: "The city was supplied by an underground aqueduct that followed the Cher River from Bléré". The aqueduct seems to have been built after the foundation of Caesarodunum, and it was in the last quarter of the 1st century that the city's main monumental facilities were built, in particular the thermes de l'Est, potential users of the aqueduct's water. This hypothesis of first-century construction is supported by the examination of some particularly well-preserved remains, such as the arches of the bridge-aqueduct crossing the Fontenay valley: the architecture of their architraves is entirely comparable to those of the Clausonnes aqueduct, near Antibes, or the Mons aqueduct at Fréjus, both of which date from the beginning of our era.

The absence of any trace of the aqueduct across the Cher and in the city of Tours has led some historians to speculate that the aqueduct, although planned to reach Tours, was never built beyond Saint-Avertin, work being halted for unknown reasons, perhaps due to financial constraints, though this speculation is unlikely. The aqueduct would have been temporarily put into service, and its water collected at Saint-Avertin and transported to Tours.

=== Maintenance ===
Most of the water collected and transported by the aqueduct comes from a shallow water table, having filtered through a layer of lacustrine limestone. It is highly charged with calcium carbonate, which, while ensuring the canal's watertight integrity, can end up considerably reducing the aqueduct's flow rate due to the accumulation of deposits. The internal walls of the canal are therefore regularly maintained and cleaned of limestone concretions. Locally, a little too "heavy" cleaning has slightly damaged the mortar lining of the canal. The regularity of maintenance seems to have been specific to the Fontenay aqueduct, since it is not observed for many other aqueducts intended to supply towns. It ensured that the aqueduct maintained a steady flow throughout its useful life.

No inspection trap has been formally identified on the aqueduct's remains, although a partially uncovered structure may have served as one. However, their presence is highly probable, since it is implausible that workers would have to travel the entire length of the aqueduct to clean it, without being able to extract themselves over a distance of more than 20 km, unless the canal's open-air outlet at the level of the crossing structures allowed access and egress. Cups, possibly interpreted as lamp holders to illuminate the interior of the aqueduct, were discovered in the canal in the 19th century; they have since been lost. The engineering structures (bridges and load-bearing walls) were also meticulously maintained. The use of red tile mortar marbled with white to waterproof the canal locally, and of brick beds in the masonry of the reinforced arches, would date these repairs to the first or second century.

The aqueduct seems to have had recurrent problems with the infiltration of water, probably muddy, between the top of the pedestals and the base of the vault, resulting in the formation of concretions inside the canal, probably caused by the growth of algae and of a very different nature to those caused by the calcareous water transported by the aqueduct. These infiltrations were an obstacle to the smooth operation of the aqueduct, and some even see in them a partial failure of the project: despite all the care taken to select and capture a resource of good mineral and sanitary quality, the water may have been polluted throughout its journey in the aqueduct.

=== Abandonment ===
Even the most recent studies, carried out in the early 2000s, cannot date the abandonment of the aqueduct. It is simply noted that a maintenance phase was underway, and almost complete, but that it was not completed and the aqueduct was never reactivated: no new concretions were formed on the cleaned sections. The cessation of operations therefore seems to have been the result of a sudden decision: it is hardly conceivable to undertake major maintenance work on a piece of equipment that is scheduled to be abandoned in such a short time. The reuse of masonry from the aqueduct in the Larçay church, whose first phase of construction dates back to the 11th century, indicates that by this time it was already out of service and partially dismantled.

== Vestiges and studies about the aqueduct ==
=== Remains ===
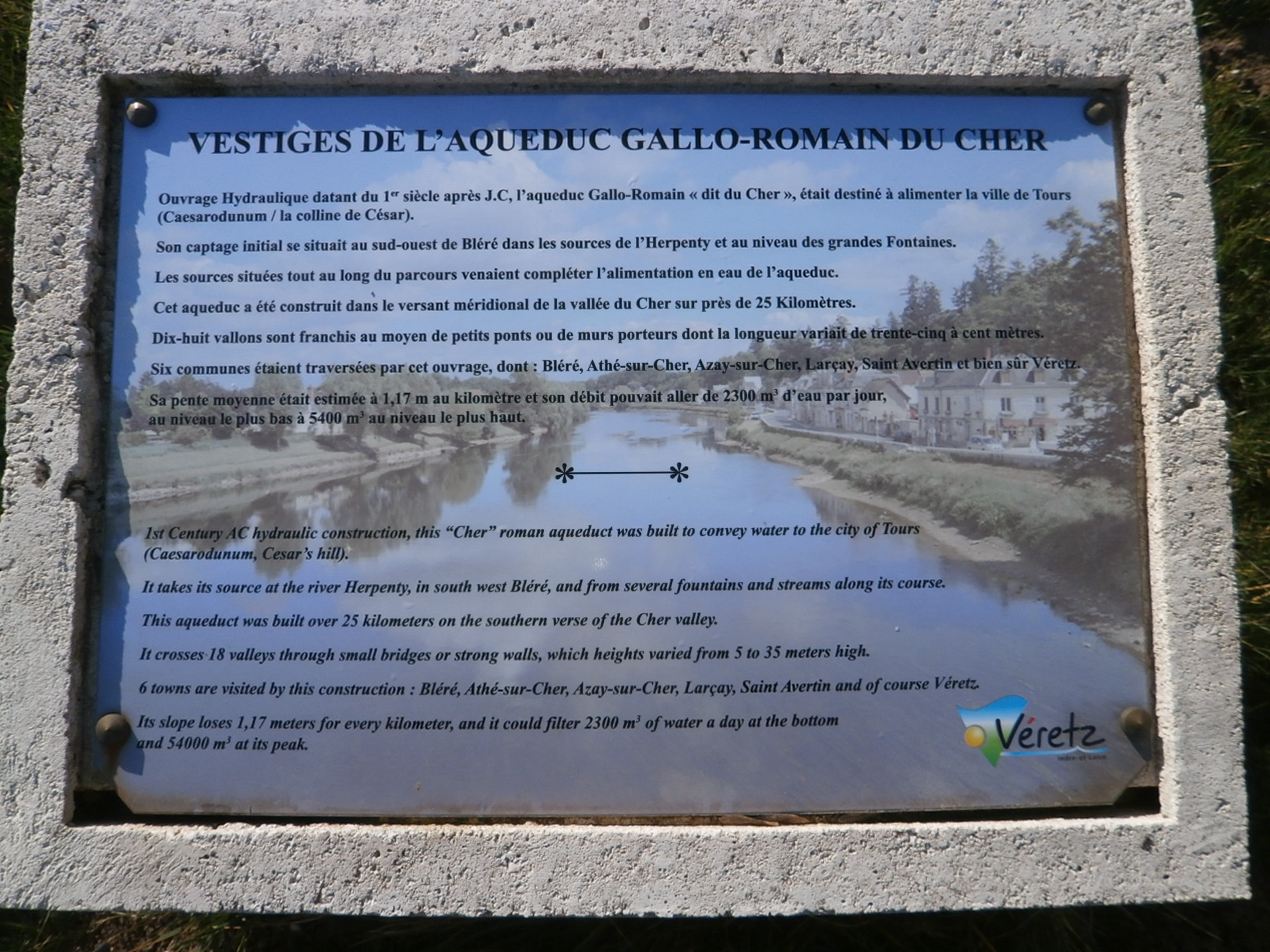
Figure 10: explanatory plaque (Véretz).

The remains of the aqueduct visible at the beginning of the 21st century sometimes take the form of simple linear relief anomalies along the route of the pipeline; landslides on the hillside have locally exposed the masonry of the canal's pedestals or vaults; the most monumental evidence is the remains of certain engineering structures, bridge piers or arches, load-bearing walls when the aqueduct crosses valleys. The vast majority of these remains, located on private property, are not accessible to the public, with the occasional exception of visits organized on European Heritage Days.

In the grounds of the Château de la Boissière, in the same commune, a ten-meter section of the aqueduct vault was unearthed in 1950. It is these remains that have been classified as historic monuments. Between the Cher and the hillside where the remains of the invert are visible, a small road has been named Rue de l'Aqueduc, possibly following the route of the ancient Bourges-Tours road on the left bank of the Cher.

A bridge-aqueduct was used to cross the Chandon valley at Athée-sur-Cher. At the beginning of the 21st century, only three piers remained, of which only the block core remains; two of them flank the east and west facades of the same dwelling, while the third, further to the west, runs alongside the D83 as it crosses the hamlet. In the 19th century, eight of these piers were still visible. On the grounds of the Château du Coteau in Azay-sur-Cher, three arches of a bridge still stand, enabling the aqueduct to cross a valley.

In Véretz, a section of the aqueduct can be seen at the entrance to the campsite, north of the D976, but it has been moved to this location after being removed from its original position during construction work. The aqueduct, after crossing the D976 to the south of which it extends westwards, can be seen above the entrance to a cellar, at the edge of a street following the route of the ancient road from Bourges to Tours and then in the château grounds.

At the eastern entrance to Larçay, in a parking lot between the road and the hillside, a cross-section of the conduit is still visible, showing the invert, the channel's pedestals, and its vault supported by a load-bearing wall approximately 1 meter above modern ground levelCaG 3.

Figure 11: Remains of the Fontenay aqueduct (selection).

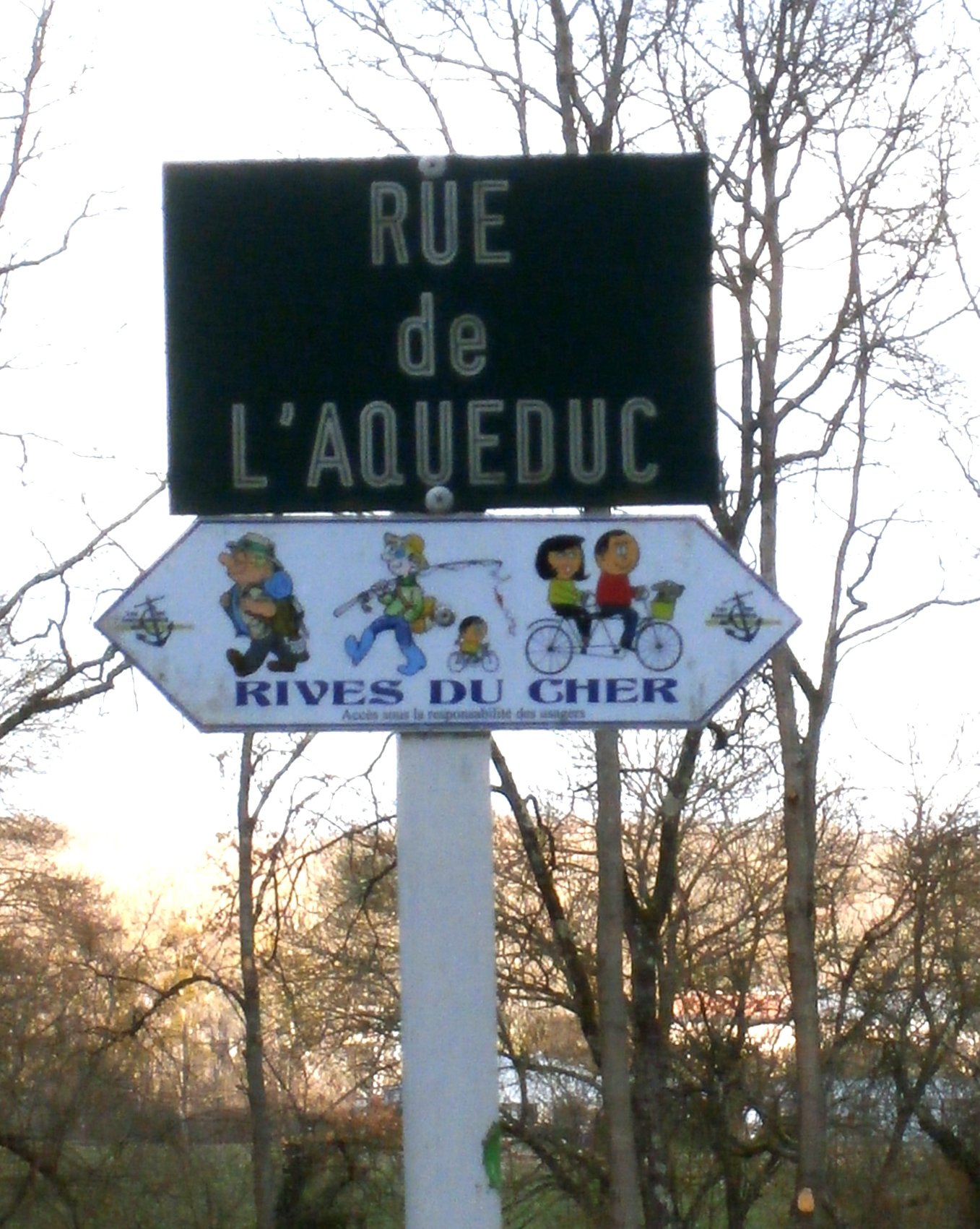
Odonymic survival: rue de l'aqueduc (Athée-sur-Cher).

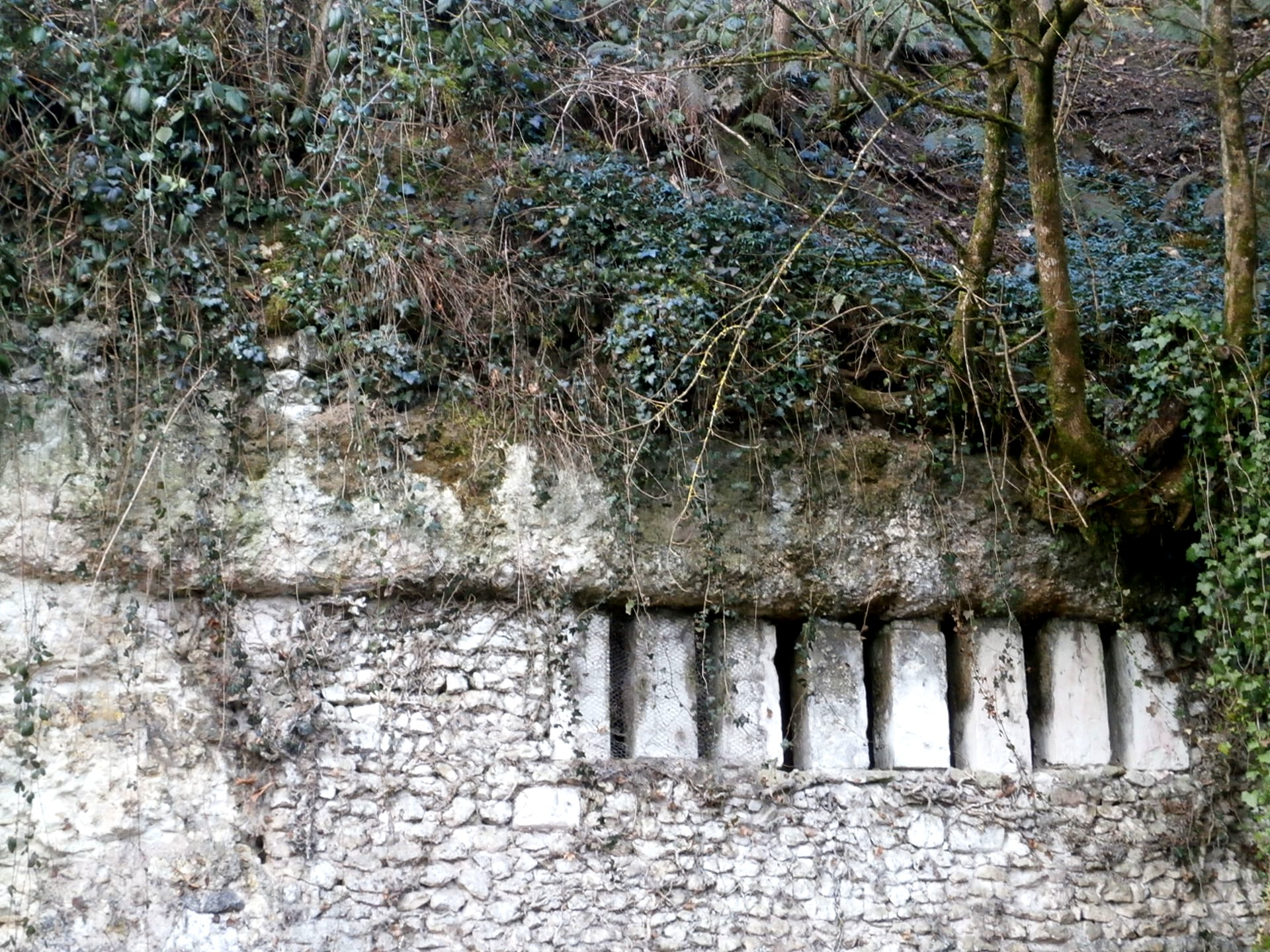
Vestige of the hillside canal (Athée-sur-Cher).

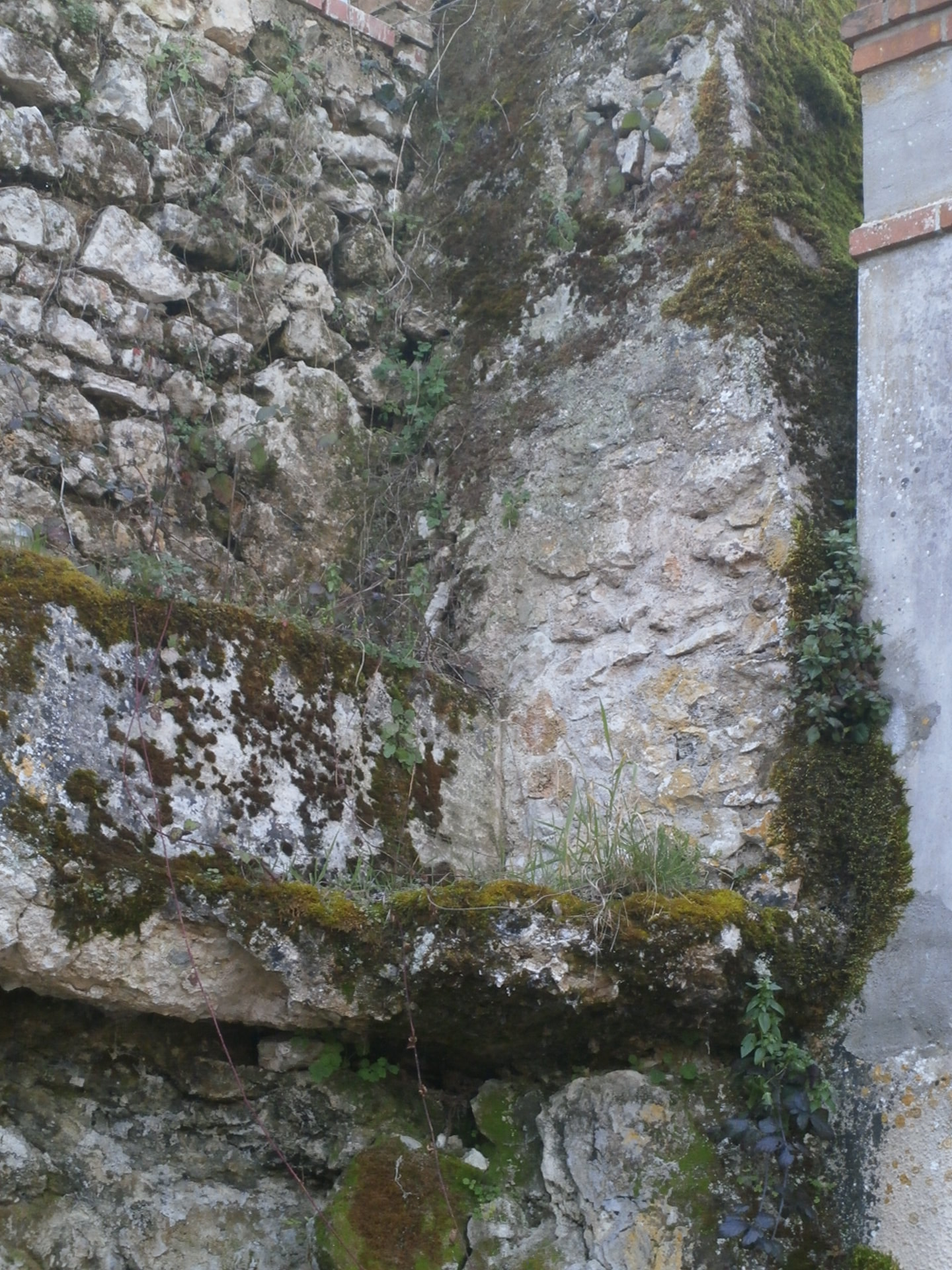
Canal remains (Véretz).

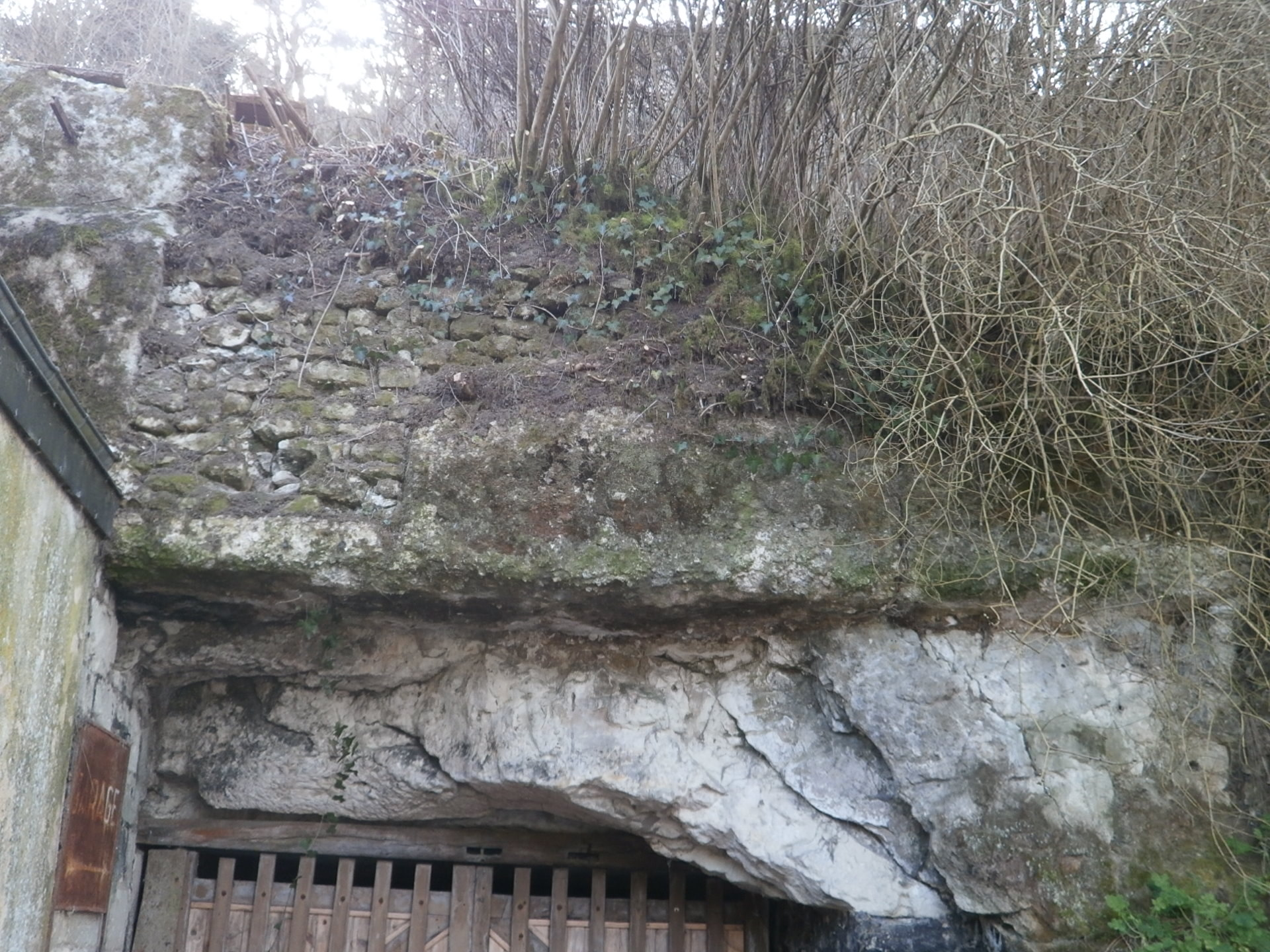
Canal remains on hillside (Véretz).

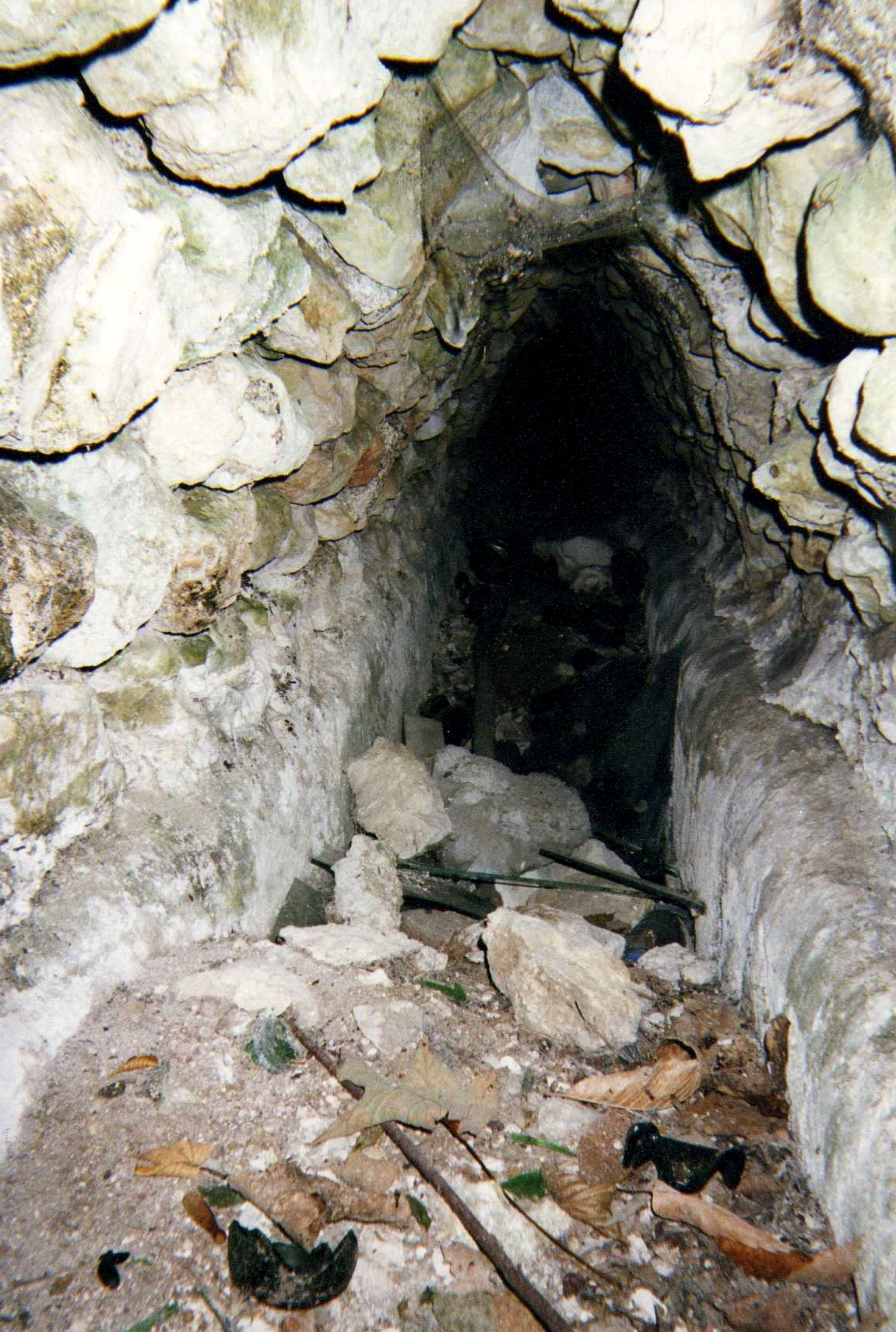
Canal cross-section (Larçay).

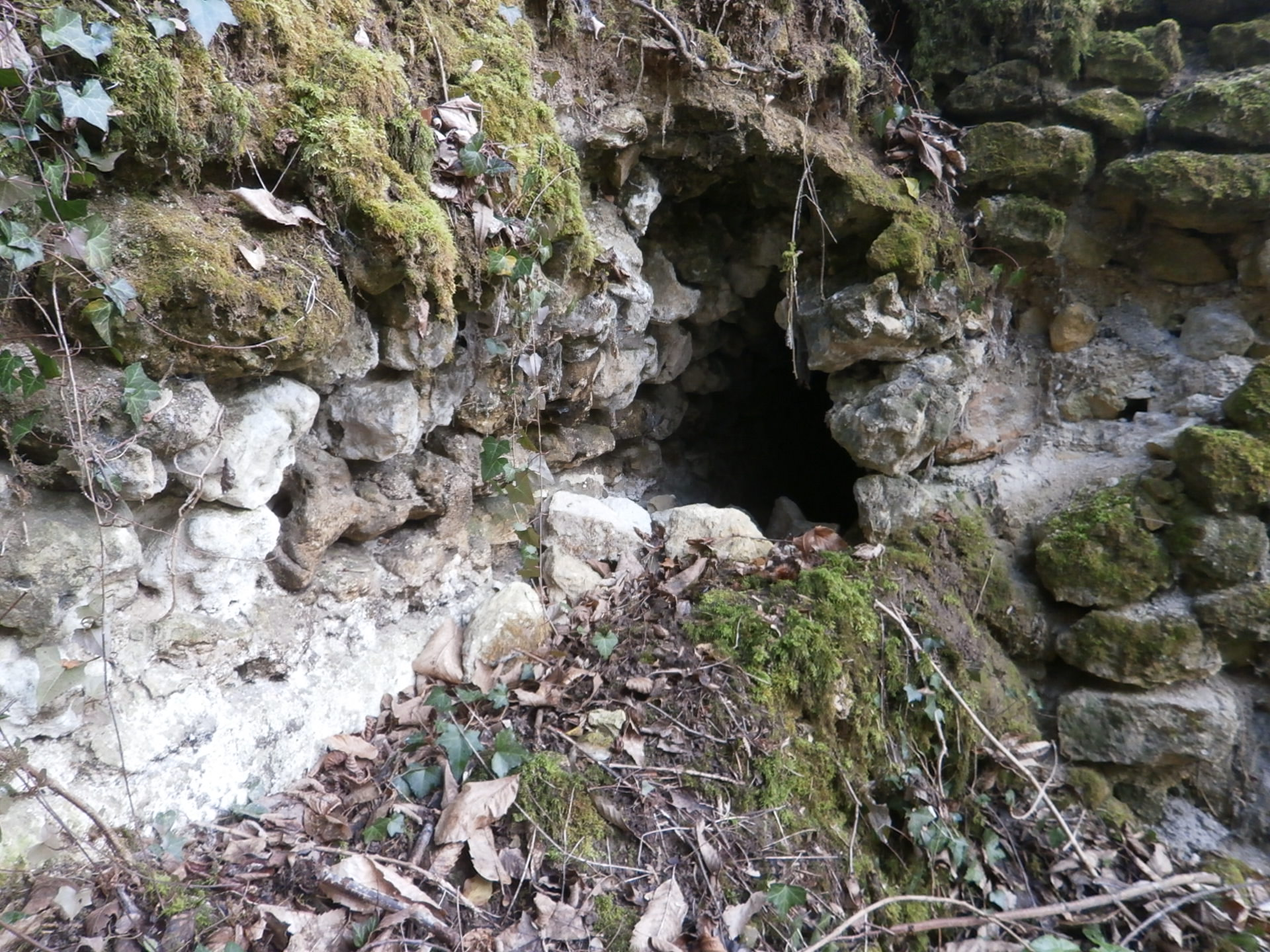
Remains of canal (Larçay).

=== Archaeological findings and studies ===
This non-exhaustive list is intended to highlight the main references and studies that demonstrate the evolution of knowledge about the aqueduct.

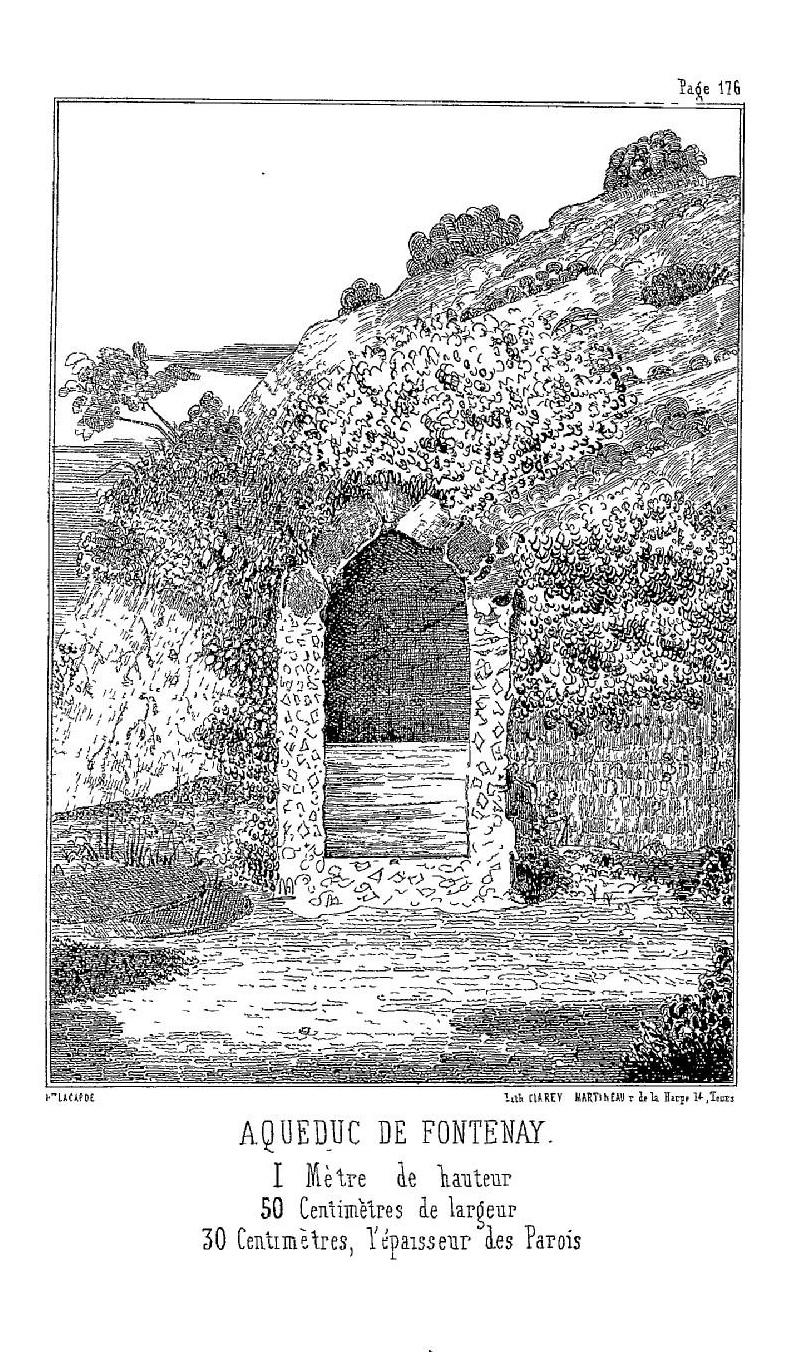
Figure 12: Cross-section of the aqueduct (1847).

Jean-Louis Chalmel, in his Histoire de la Touraine published in 1828, mentions the aqueduct in the following terms: "At the source of the Fontenai stream [...] begins a vaulted canal [...] as far as the commune of Larçay", but he refutes, as already stated, the idea that this aqueduct could have supplied the Roman town of Casesarodunum.

In a national context favourable to archaeological research – the Société archéologique de Touraine was founded in 1840 – Louis Boilleau proposed in 1847 a description of the aqueduct and some of its remains; he also expressed the wish that more complete studies be carried out. This work, published in the memoirs of the Société archéologique de Touraine, was also the subject, in 1848, of an eight-page offprint accompanied by a plate of drawings, becoming probably the first publication entirely devoted to the Fontenay aqueduct.

In 1858, the Société archéologique de Touraine organized an excursion for its members to visit the archaeological remains of the Cher valley, including the Fontenay aqueduct at Larçay. However, the report of this visit situates the starting point of the aqueduct at Athée-sur-Cher, some 10 km west of its actual origin, and mentions the reuse of its terminal section, in the crossing of the Cher, by a 16th-century aqueduct.

Numerous 19th-century writings, in addition to those mentioned above, mention remains attributed to the Fontenay aqueduct, such as the six volumes of the Dictionnaire géographique, historique et biographique d'Indre-et-Loire et de l'ancienne province de Touraine written by Jacques-Xavier Carré de Busserolle between 1878 and 1884. The wars of 1870, and above all 1914–1918 and 1939–1945, interrupted archaeological research. In the early 1960s, Camille Liot took up the bibliographical data and compared them with the reality on the ground; his study was published in 1963–64. He was able to confirm certain information, but he also rejected others, notably when the alleged remains were found at too high an altitude, incompatible with the general slope of the aqueduct. A final part of this study, which the author wished to devote to the route of the aqueduct as it crossed the Cher and the city of Tours, does not appear to have been published, or perhaps even undertaken.

In 1968, archaeologist Jacques Dubois, while working in the Fontenay Valley in Bléré, uncovered two new sections of the canal, close to its main source, thereby advancing our knowledge of the aqueduct's water supply and its catchment area.

In 2003, Cyril Driard undertook an exhaustive study of the entire length of the aqueduct, as part of a master's thesis in archaeology written in 2004, several summaries of which have been published, notably in a book devoted to archaeological research in Tours over the past 40 years. Thanks to tools not available to his predecessors (GPS, among others), and by synthesizing the results of previous research, he was able to offer a more global vision of the monument. However, the question of the aqueduct's final destination remains unanswered.

== See also ==
- List of aqueducts in the Roman Empire

== Bibliography ==
=== Specific publications on Touraine archaeology and history ===
- Bousrez, Louis. Étude sur les aqueducs de l'époque romaine en Touraine (in French). Bulletin archéologique du Comité des travaux historiques et scientifiques (CTHS).
- Couderc, Jean-Mary (1987). Dictionnaire des communes de Touraine (in French). CLD. ISBN 2-85443-136-7.
- Couderc, Jean-Mary (1995). La Touraine insolite : série 3 (in French). CLD. ISBN 2-85443-287-8.
- Driard, Cyrille (2004). Recherches sur l'alimentation en eau de Caesarodunum : l'aqueduc du Cher, mémoire de maîtrise (in French). Vol. 1, 2. Université François-Rabelais.
- Galinié, Henri (2007). Tours antique et médiéval. Lieux de vie, temps de la ville. 40 ans d'archéologie urbaine, 30e supplément à la Revue archéologique du centre de la France (RACF), numéro spécial de la collection Recherches sur Tours (in French). FERACF. ISBN 978-2-91327-215-6.
  - Driard, Cyril. "L'alimentation de la ville en eau par l'aqueduc du Cher". In Galinié (2007).
- Liot, Camille (1964). "Contribution à l'étude des aqueducs romains en Touraine. Recherches sur l'alimentation en eau de Caesarodunum à l'époque romaine par l'aqueduc de Fontenay (deuxième partie)". Revue Archéologique du Centre (in French). 3. Revue archéologique du centre de la France: 3–17. doi:10.3406/racf.1964.1120.
- Provost, Michel (1988). Carte archéologique de la Gaule - l'Indre-et Loire-37 (in French). Académie des inscriptions et belles-lettres. ISBN 2-87754-002-2.

=== General publications devoted in whole or in part to architecture in the Roman Empire ===
- Bedon, Robert; Pinon, Pierre; Chevallier, Raymond (1988). Architecture et urbanisme en Gaule romaine : L'architecture et la ville. Les Hespérides (in French). Errance. ISBN 2-903-44279-7.
- Bedon, Robert (1999). Les aqueducs de la Gaule romaine et des régions voisines (in French). Presses Universitaires de Limoges. ISBN 978-2842871116.
- Duby, Georges (1980). Histoire de la France urbaine, vol. 1 : La ville antique, des origines au ixe siècle. L’univers historique (in French). Le Seuil. ISBN 2-020-05590-2.
- Liot, Camille (1963). "Contribution à l'étude des aqueducs romains en Touraine. Recherches sur l'alimentation en eau de Caesarodunum à l'époque romaine par l'aqueduc de Fontenay (première partie)". Revue Archéologique du Centre (in French). 2 (4). Revue archéologique du centre de la France: 293–310. doi:10.3406/racf.1963.1107.
- Malissard, Alain (2002). Les romains et l'eau. Realia (in French). Les Belles Lettres. ISBN 2-251-33814-4.

=== Ancient sources ===
- Panckoucke, C. L. F. Des aqueducs de la ville de Rome (in French).
