= Bléré =

- Commune
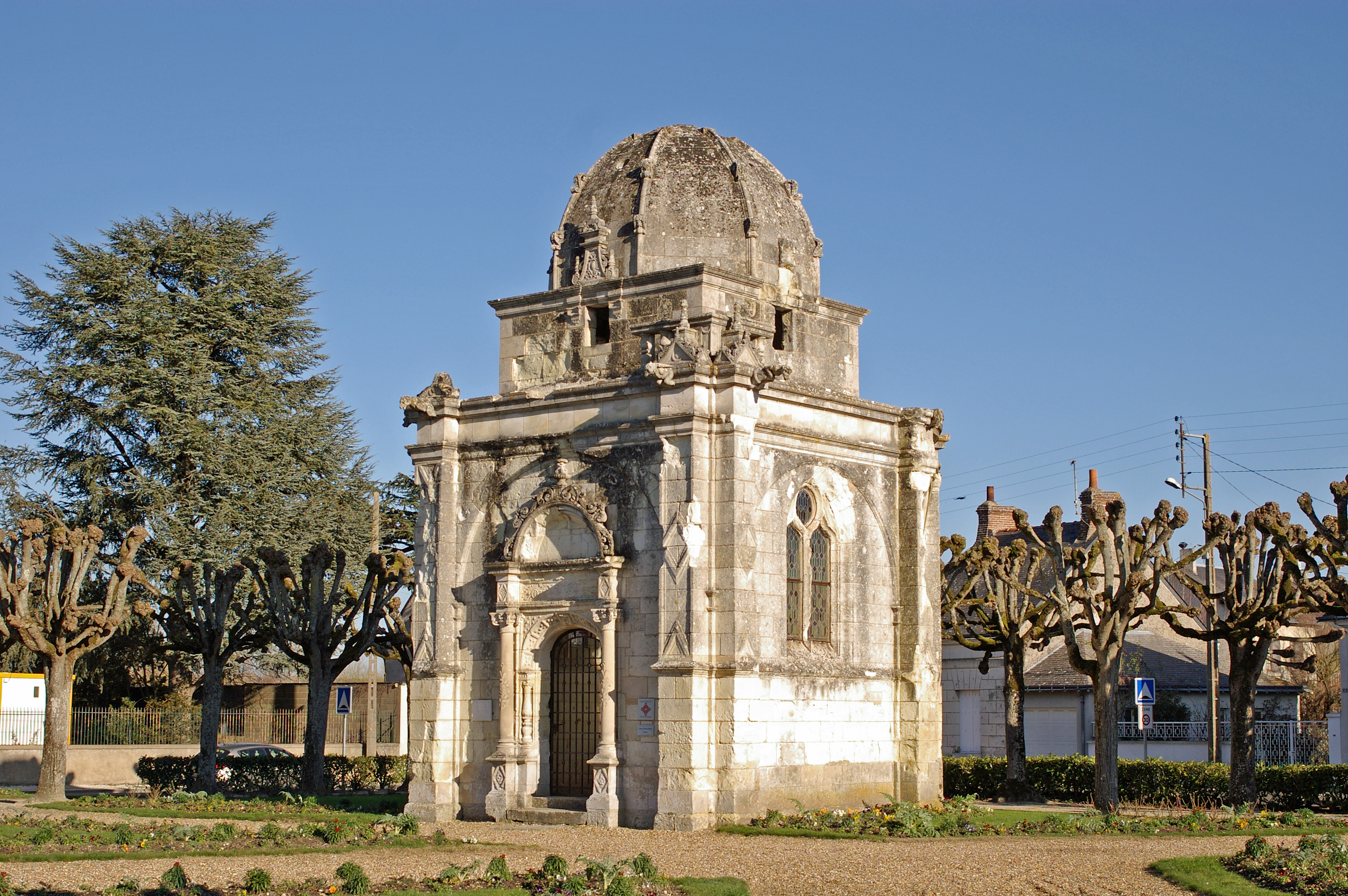
- The Chapel of Jehan de Saignés, in Bléré

- Coat of arms
- Location of Bléré
- Location within France Location within Centre-Val de Loire
- Coordinates: 47°19′33″N 0°59′26″E
- Country: France
- Region: Centre-Val de Loire
- Department: Indre-et-Loire
- Arrondissement: Loches
- Canton: Bléré

Government
  - Mayor (2020–2026): Fabien Nebel
- Area^{1}: 30.8 km^{2} (11.9 sq mi)
- Highest elevation: 112 m (367 ft)
- Lowest elevation: 52 m (171 ft)
- Population (2023): 5,352
  - Density: 174/km^{2} (450/sq mi)
- Time zone: UTC+01:00 (CET)
  - Summer (DST): UTC+02:00 (CEST)
- INSEE/Postal code: 37027 /37150
- ^{1} French Land Register data, which excludes lakes, ponds, glaciers > 1 km^{2} (0.386 sq mi or 247 acres) and river estuaries.

Bléré (French pronunciation: [bleʁe]) is a commune in the Indre-et-Loire department in central France.

== Geography ==
=== Cultural surroundings ===
Bléré, in the administrative region of "Centre Val-de-Loire", is located 27 km from Tours, 225 km southwest of Paris, and is close to the great châteaux of the Loire Valley. It is close to:

- 7 km west of Chenonceaux;
- 10 km south of Amboise;
- 14 km east of Montlouis-sur-Loire;
- 17 km west of Montrichard.

The town of Bléré is located in the Cher valley and in a rather wooded agricultural and wine region.

== Transport Network ==
=== Main highways ===
The A85 motorway goes through the south of the city connecting the cities of Angers and Vierzon, its exit 11 allows you to reach the city.

The A10 (or E60) motorway passes through the town of Auzouer-en-Touraine 30.5 km from Bléré.

=== Connections to intercity road and rail connections ===
Bléré-La Croix is a train station served by the TER Centre-Val de Loire connecting the cities of Tours, Bléré, Saint-Aignan, Vierzon, Bourges and Nevers.

Line D of the interurban mobility network (or REMI) connecting the Bléré-Tours terminals serves four stops in Bléré.

== Population ==
Historical population

Year	Pop.	±% p.a.
1793	2,153	—
1800	2,519	+2.27%
1806	2,475	−0.29%
1821	2,663	+0.49%
1831	2,948	+1.02%
1836	2,978	+0.20%
1841	3,417	+2.79%
1846	3,493	+0.44%
1851	3,676	+1.03%
1856	3,431	−1.37%
1861	3,477	+0.27%
1866	3,561	+0.48%
1872	3,510	−0.24%
1876	3,675	+1.16%
1881	3,688	+0.07%
1886	3,599	−0.49%
1891	3,272	−1.89%
1896	3,269	−0.02%
1901	3,288	+0.12%

Year	Pop.	±% p.a.
1906	3,342	+0.33%
1911	3,533	+1.12%
1921	3,156	−1.12%
1926	3,160	+0.03%
1931	3,041	−0.76%
1936	3,070	+0.19%
1946	3,250	+0.57%
1954	3,420	+0.64%
1962	3,450	+0.11%
1968	3,832	+1.77%
1975	4,113	+1.02%
1982	4,057	−0.20%
1990	4,388	+0.99%
1999	4,576	+0.47%
2007	5,045	+1.23%
2012	5,250	+0.80%
2017	5,272	+0.08%
2023	5,352	+0.25%

Source: EHESS and INSEE (1968-2023)

== International relations ==
Bléré is twinned with:

- Montegiardino, San Marino (2017)

== See also ==
- Communes of the Indre-et-Loire department
