= Azay-sur-Cher =

- Commune
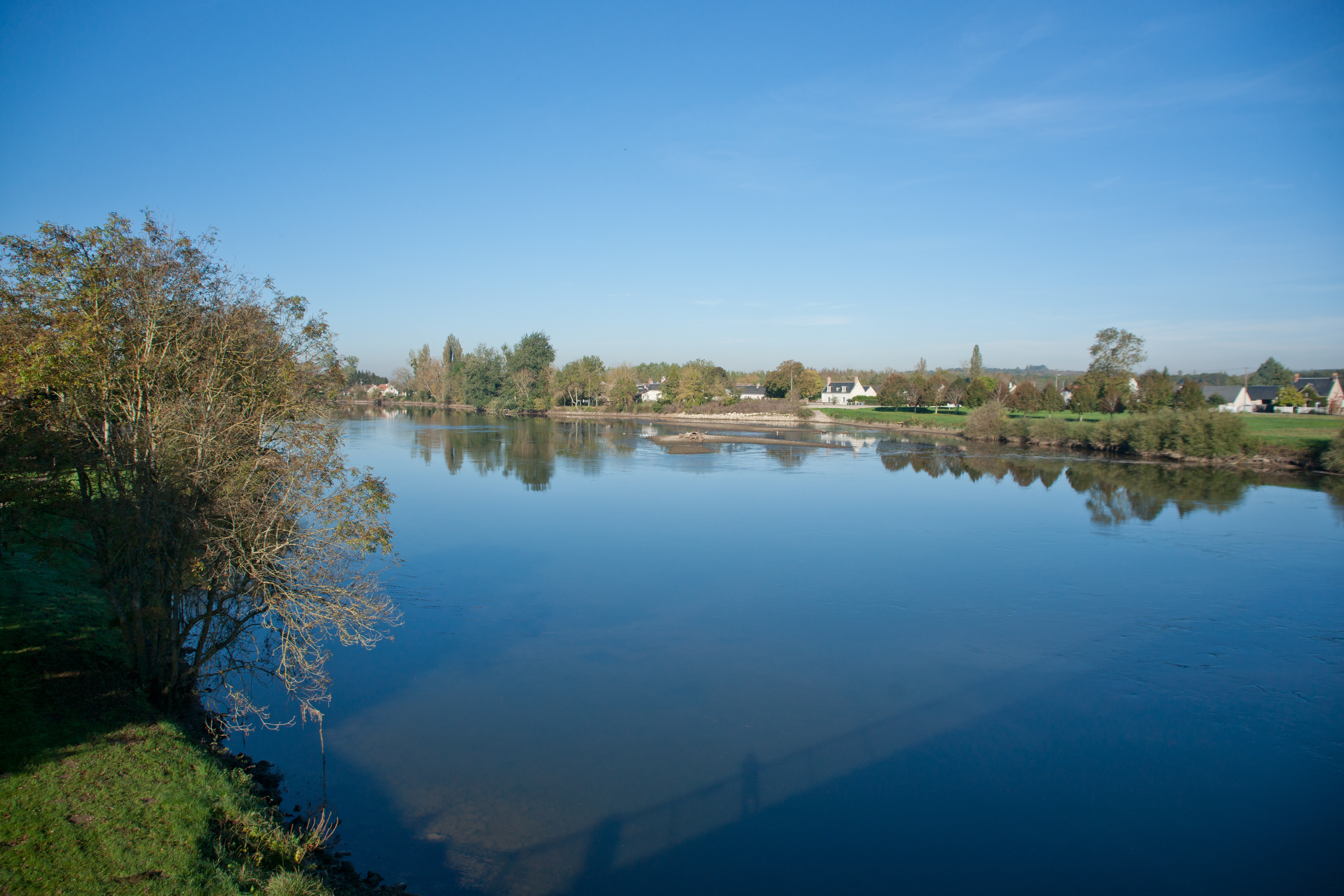
- The Cher river in Azay-sur-Cher

- Coat of arms
- Location of Azay-sur-Cher
- Location within France Location within Centre-Val de Loire
- Coordinates: 47°21′00″N 0°50′49″E
- Country: France
- Region: Centre-Val de Loire
- Department: Indre-et-Loire
- Arrondissement: Tours
- Canton: Bléré
- Intercommunality: CC Touraine-Est Vallées

Government
  - Mayor (2020–2026): Janick Alary
- Area^{1}: 22.85 km^{2} (8.82 sq mi)
- Highest elevation: 103 m (338 ft)
- Lowest elevation: 48 m (157 ft)
- Population (2023): 3,243
  - Density: 141.9/km^{2} (367.6/sq mi)
- Time zone: UTC+01:00 (CET)
  - Summer (DST): UTC+02:00 (CEST)
- INSEE/Postal code: 37015 /37270
- ^{1} French Land Register data, which excludes lakes, ponds, glaciers > 1 km^{2} (0.386 sq mi or 247 acres) and river estuaries.

Azay-sur-Cher (French pronunciation: [azɛ syʁ ʃɛʁ], Azay on Cher) is a commune in the Indre-et-Loire department in central France. It is twinned with Bedale, North Yorkshire, UK.

== Population ==
Historical population

Year	Pop.	±% p.a.
1793	1,314	—
1800	1,153	−1.85%
1806	1,201	+0.68%
1821	1,209	+0.04%
1831	1,355	+1.15%
1836	1,296	−0.89%
1841	1,262	−0.53%
1846	1,223	−0.63%
1851	1,289	+1.06%
1856	1,301	+0.19%
1861	1,307	+0.09%
1866	1,317	+0.15%
1872	1,250	−0.87%
1876	1,260	+0.20%
1881	1,324	+1.00%
1886	1,331	+0.11%
1891	1,206	−1.95%
1896	1,107	−1.70%
1901	1,114	+0.13%

Year	Pop.	±% p.a.
1906	1,125	+0.20%
1911	1,111	−0.25%
1921	1,089	−0.20%
1926	1,116	+0.49%
1931	1,052	−1.17%
1936	1,077	+0.47%
1946	1,131	+0.49%
1954	1,144	+0.14%
1962	1,150	+0.07%
1968	1,194	+0.63%
1975	1,375	+2.04%
1982	1,830	+4.17%
1990	2,408	+3.49%
1999	2,704	+1.30%
2007	2,915	+0.94%
2012	3,023	+0.73%
2017	3,082	+0.39%
2023	3,243	+0.85%

Source: EHESS and INSEE (1968-2023)

== See also ==
- Communes of the Indre-et-Loire department
