= Athée-sur-Cher =

- Commune
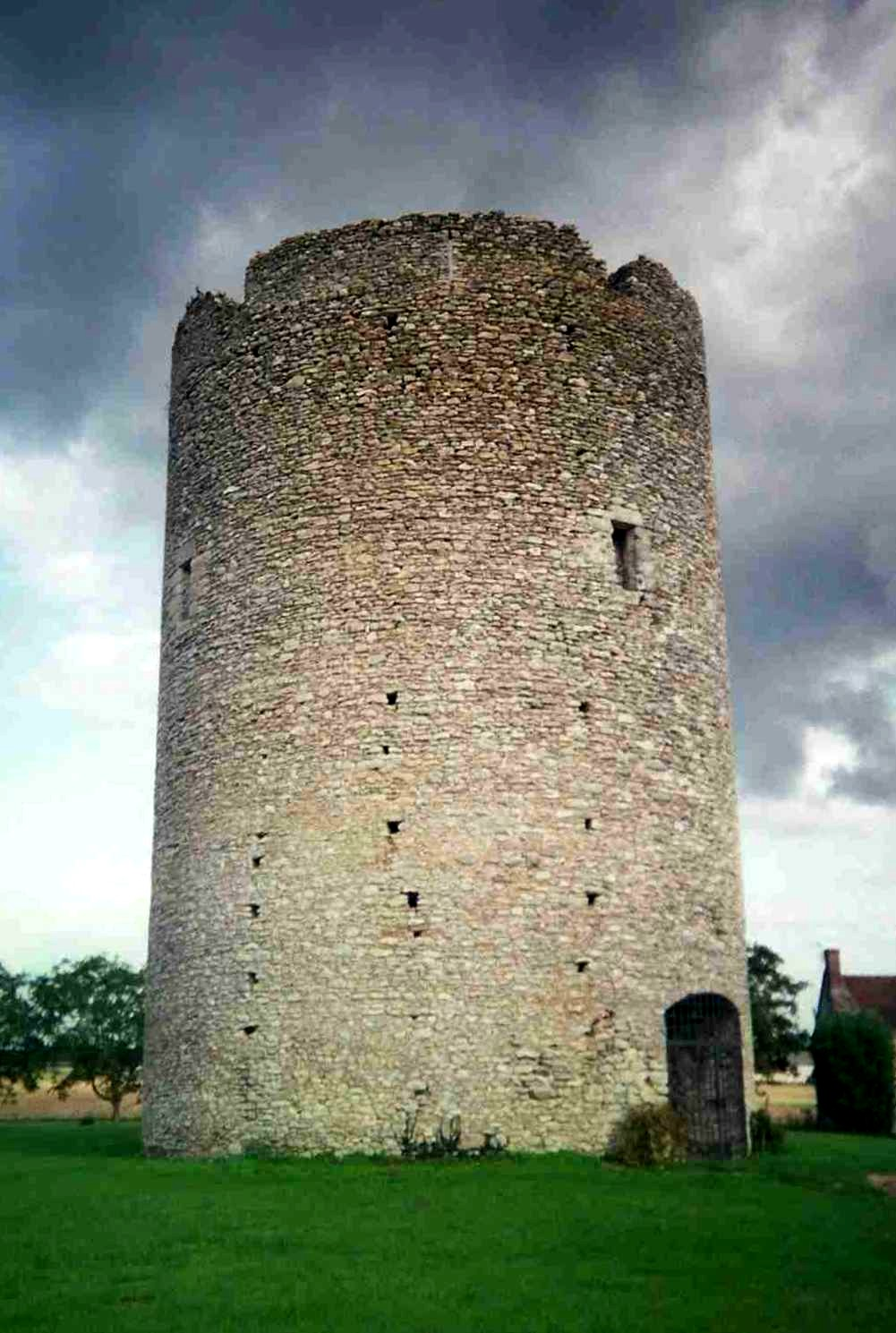
- The Tower of Brandon, in Athée-sur-Cher

- Coat of arms
- Location of Athée-sur-Cher
- Location within France Location within Centre-Val de Loire
- Coordinates: 47°19′18″N 0°54′59″E
- Country: France
- Region: Centre-Val de Loire
- Department: Indre-et-Loire
- Arrondissement: Loches
- Canton: Bléré
- Intercommunality: CC Bléré Val Cher

Government
  - Mayor (2020–2026): Olivier Delaveau
- Area^{1}: 34.47 km^{2} (13.31 sq mi)
- Highest elevation: 104 m (341 ft)
- Lowest elevation: 49 m (161 ft)
- Population (2023): 2,855
  - Density: 82.83/km^{2} (214.5/sq mi)
- Time zone: UTC+01:00 (CET)
  - Summer (DST): UTC+02:00 (CEST)
- INSEE/Postal code: 37008 /37270
- ^{1} French Land Register data, which excludes lakes, ponds, glaciers > 1 km^{2} (0.386 sq mi or 247 acres) and river estuaries.

Athée-sur-Cher (French pronunciation: [ate syʁ ʃɛʁ], literally Athée on Cher) is a commune in the Indre-et-Loire department in central France.

== Population ==
Historical population

Year	Pop.	±% p.a.
1793	1,246	—
1800	1,340	+1.04%
1806	1,214	−1.63%
1821	1,239	+0.14%
1831	1,304	+0.51%
1836	1,381	+1.15%
1841	1,356	−0.36%
1846	1,492	+1.93%
1851	1,373	−1.65%
1856	1,402	+0.42%
1861	1,455	+0.74%
1866	1,441	−0.19%
1872	1,373	−0.80%
1876	1,342	−0.57%
1881	1,377	+0.52%
1886	1,367	−0.15%
1891	1,327	−0.59%
1896	1,249	−1.20%
1901	1,157	−1.52%

Year	Pop.	±% p.a.
1906	1,148	−0.16%
1911	1,145	−0.05%
1921	1,066	−0.71%
1926	1,044	−0.42%
1931	1,011	−0.64%
1936	1,013	+0.04%
1946	1,059	+0.45%
1954	1,012	−0.57%
1962	1,094	+0.98%
1968	1,063	−0.48%
1975	1,256	+2.41%
1982	1,506	+2.63%
1990	1,819	+2.39%
1999	2,019	+1.17%
2007	2,352	+1.93%
2012	2,618	+2.17%
2017	2,673	+0.42%
2023	2,855	+1.10%

Source: EHESS and INSEE (1968-2023)

== See also ==
- Communes of the Indre-et-Loire department
