= Montsoreau =

- Commune
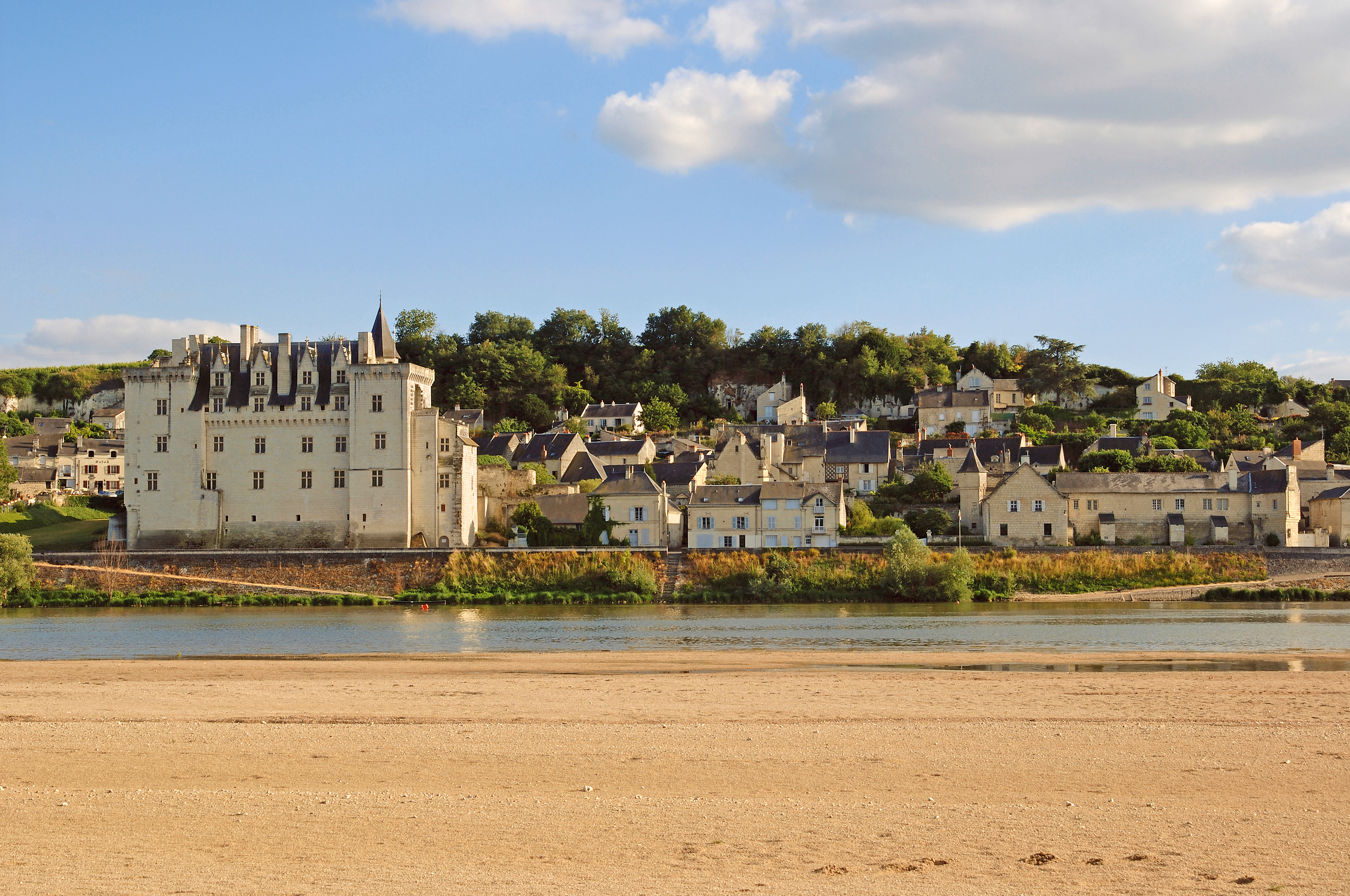
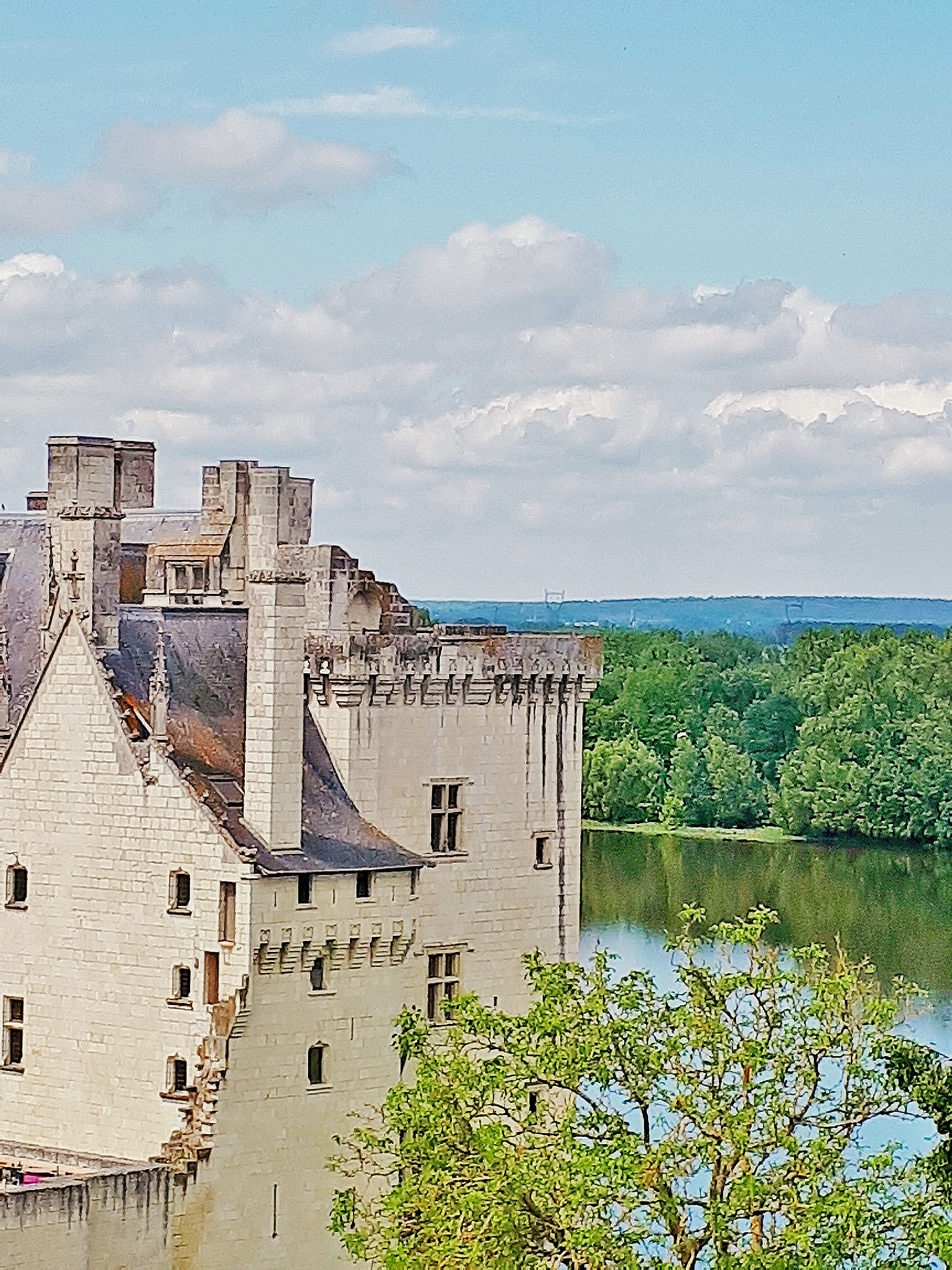
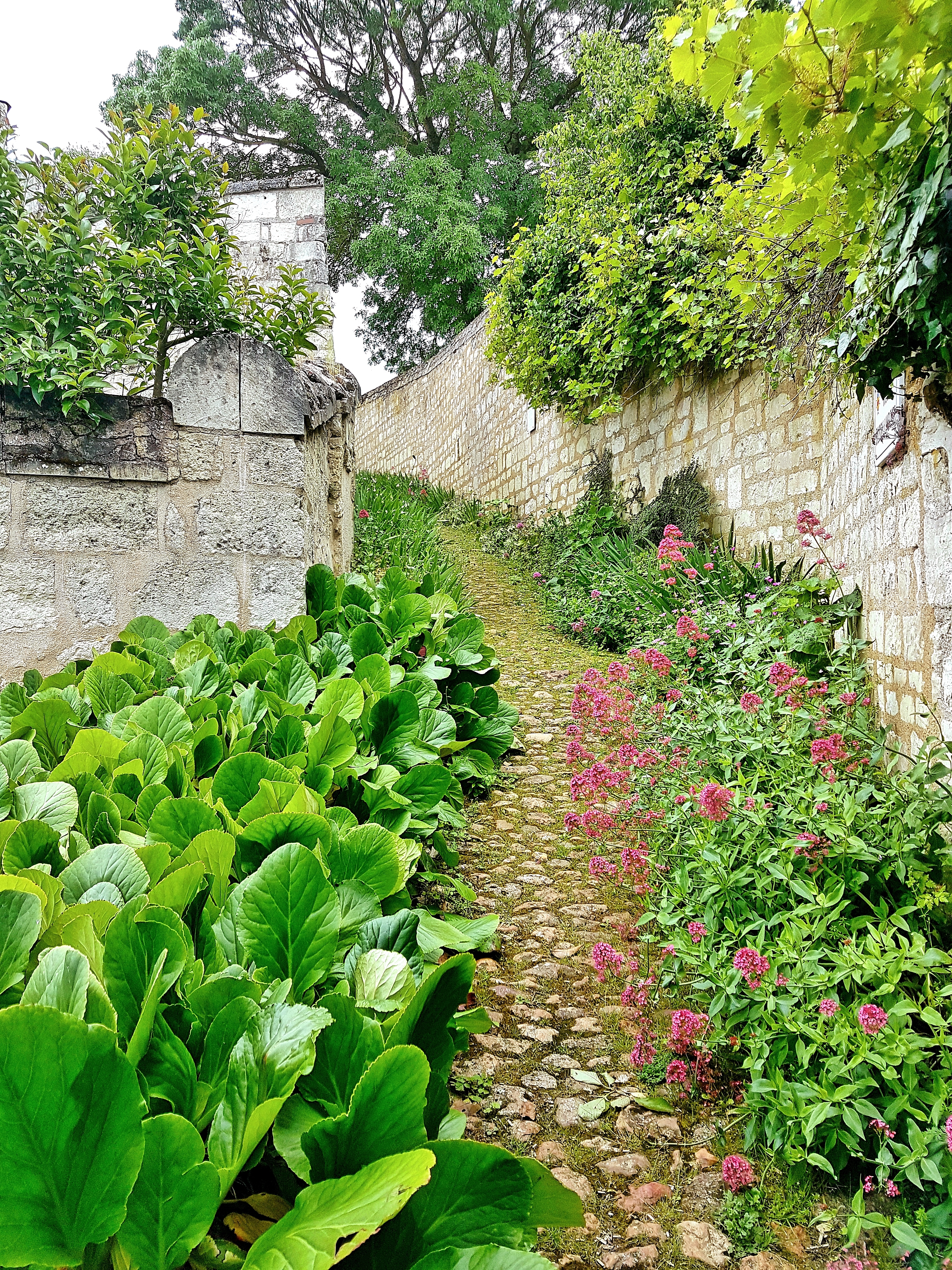
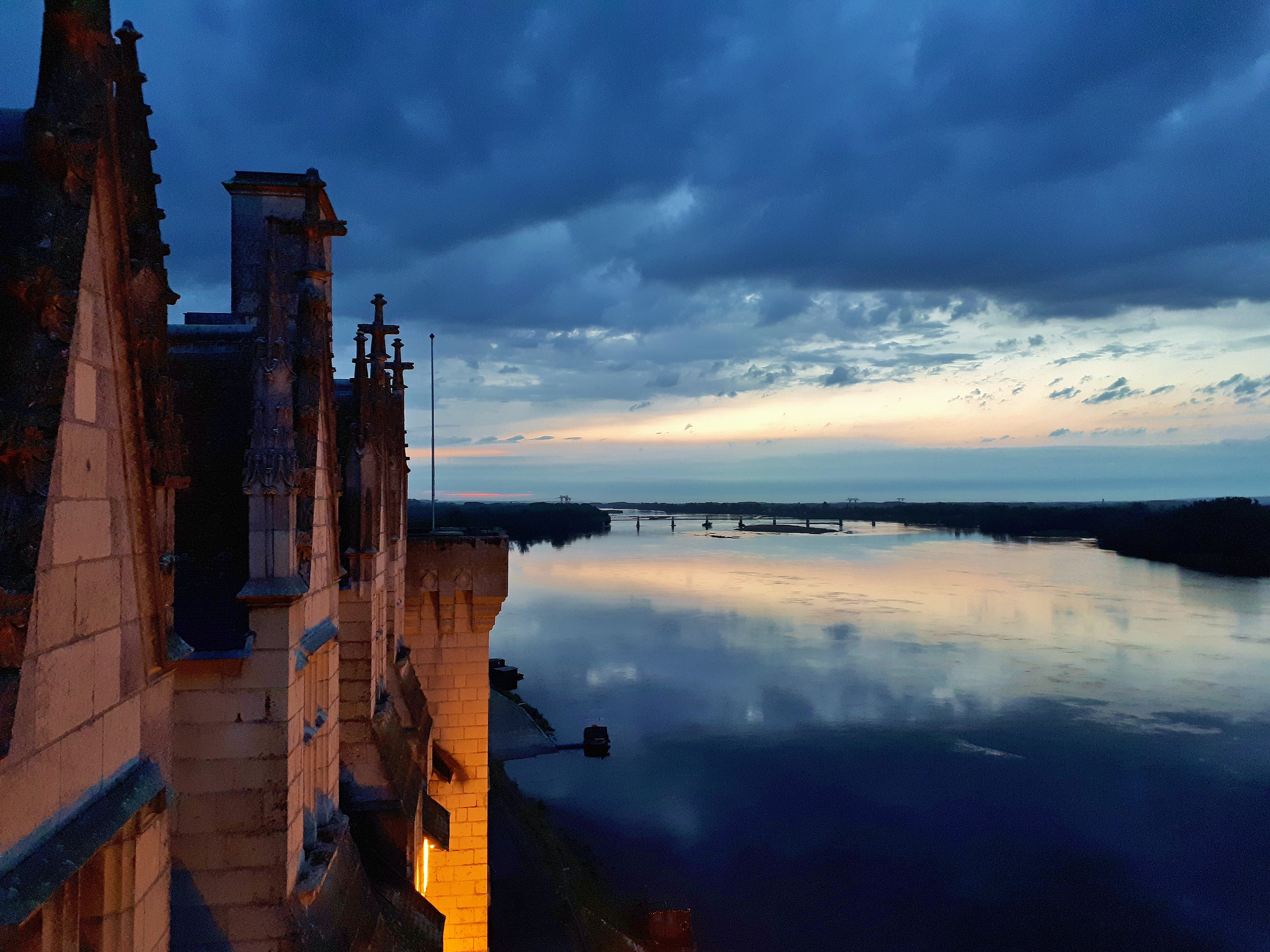
- Top to bottom, left to right: Panoramic view of the village from the Loire; Château de Montsoreau-Museum of Contemporary Art; Typical street of Monstoreau listed among The Most Beautiful Villages of France (Les Plus Beaux Villages de France; Sunset in Montsoreau from the Château de Montsoreau-Museum of Contemporary Art

- Coat of arms
- Location of Montsoreau
- Location within France Location within Pays de la Loire
- Coordinates: 47°12′59″N 0°03′25″E
- Country: France
- Region: Pays de la Loire
- Department: Maine-et-Loire
- Arrondissement: Saumur
- Canton: Saumur
- Intercommunality: CA Saumur Val de Loire

Government
  - Mayor (2020–2026): Jacky Marchand
- Area^{1}: 5.19 km^{2} (2.00 sq mi)
- Elevation: 36 m (118 ft)
- Highest elevation: 88 m (289 ft)
- Lowest elevation: 27 m (89 ft)
- Population (2023): 408
  - Density: 78.6/km^{2} (204/sq mi)
- Time zone: UTC+01:00 (CET)
  - Summer (DST): UTC+02:00 (CEST)
- INSEE/Postal code: 49219 /49730
- ^{1} French Land Register data, which excludes lakes, ponds, glaciers > 1 km^{2} (0.386 sq mi or 247 acres) and river estuaries.

Montsoreau (French pronunciation: [mɔ̃sɔʁo]) is a commune of the Loire Valley in the Maine-et-Loire department in Western France on the Loire, 160 km (99 mi) from the Atlantic coast and 250 km (160 mi) from Paris. The village is listed among The Most Beautiful Villages of France (French: Les Plus Beaux Villages de France) and is part of the Loire Valley UNESCO World Heritage Site.

Montsoreau was identified under the name Restis (rope or fishnet) at the end of classical antiquity as a port on the Loire at the confluence of the Loire and the Vienne. It has taken its name Mount Soreau (Mont Soreau) from a rocky promontory situated in the riverbed of the Loire and surrounded by water on top of which was built a fortress in 990. There have been three major buildings on this promontory, a Gallo-Roman temple or administrative building, a fortified castle, and a Renaissance palace.

Montsoreau was, until the seventeenth century, a center of jurisdiction and the seigneury of Montsoreau stretched from the river Loire to Seuilly-l'Abbaye and Coudray castle in the south. After the French Revolution, the exploitation of a building stone, the tuffeau stone, abruptly increased its population of 600 inhabitants to more than 1000, maintained during the first half of the nineteenth century. This stone, easy to work, was gradually exhausted, and the population decreased to stabilize again around 600 people. Montsoreau then concentrated its activities on agriculture, wine and river trade until the end of the nineteenth century. During the Twentieth century, Montsoreau has seen river trade replaced by terrestrial trade and the rise of a tourism economy.

== Etymology ==
The name Mount Soreau (Latin: Castrum Monte Sorello, Mons Sorello, Mountsorrell, Monte-Sorel, Monsorel, Munsorel, Muntesorel, Montsorel), appears in its Latin form, for the first time, in 1086 in a cartulary. Mons or Monte (mount) refers to the rocky promontory, located in the river bed of the Loire, and on which was built the fortress of Montsoreau. No interpretation has been given of the name Sorello, which is found in several Latinized forms: Sorello, Sorel, Sorelli.

Its first recorded name at the end of the Roman period (circa AD 800) was the Domaine de Rest, Domaine de Rest-sous-Montsoreau or Restis, Restis (rope or fishnet) referring to its port.

In La Dame de Monsoreau, Alexandre Dumas suggests another origin to the name of the Mont Soreau:

– Ah, faith, I 'll let monseigneur le Duc d' Anjou wait. This man piques my curiosity. I think him a very singular person. I don't know why – you get this sort of ideas into your head, you know, the first time you meet people. I don't know why, but I expect to have a crow to pluck with this fellow, some time or other; and then, his name, Monsoreau!

– Mont de la Souris (Mousehill), returned Antraguet; that's the etymology of it. My old abbé told me all about it this morning; Mons Soricis.

– I accept the interpretation, answered Bussy.

== History ==
=== Prehistory and Antiquity ===
Traces of first settlements and the oldest remains in Montsoreau are set back from the river Loire, on the plateau in high areas. The main witness of this occupation is the dolmen of the Pierrelée, which probably dates from the 3rd millennium BC and is made up of six imposing slabs of hard sandstone coming from deposits in the neighborhood. Montsoreau is located on the borders of the ancient territories of the Gallic tribes of Pictones, Turones and Andecavi. Coins, shards, and fragments of Gallo-Roman tiles, were found in Montsoreau, especially on the edge of the plateau, above the town. The shaft of a fluted column, discovered during excavations of the castle built by Fulk Nerra, could attest to the presence of a notable public building on the top of the rock of Montsoreau.

=== Middle Ages ===
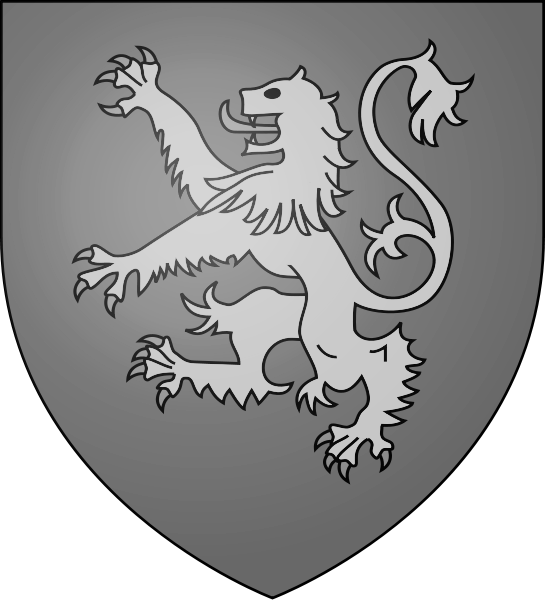
Henry II of England Besieges and takes Montsoreau in 1152.

The first texts mentioning the domain of Restis dates back to the sixth century. An act of Charles the Bald indicates the presence, in AD 850 of houses, a fishery and a port in Rest. In the middle of the tenth century, according to the hagiographic narratives, mention is made of caves in which the monk Absalon, coming from Tournus, was first considering to shelter the relics of Saint-Florent before bringing them further downstream the Loire and settle in Saumur. In AD 990 the Count of Blois Odo I built a fortress on the rock of Montsoreau and transformed the village into a stronghold. The Count of Anjou, Fulk Nerra, took the fortress in AD 1001 and incorporated it to Anjou. Fulk, who was one of the first great builders of Medieval castles, modified it, and the fortress remained under the control of Anjou, never taken, for more than 150 years. In 1101, during the installation of the Fontevraud community, the abbey of Fontevraud depended on Gautier I of Montsoreau, a direct vassal of the count of Anjou. Gautier's mother-in-law, Hersende de Champagne, was the first grand-prioress during the life of Robert d'Arbrissel. In 1156, Guillaume IV de Montsoreau sided with Geoffroy Plantagenet against his brother Henry II Plantagenet, future king of England and husband of Eleanor of Aquitaine. Henry II besieged the castle (castrum) and took it at the end of August 1152 despite the care taken at its fortification. This was the one and only storming of the medieval fortress of Montsoreau between Fulk and Jean II de Chambes in 1450.

=== Renaissance ===
Between the end of the Hundred Years' War and the end of the French Wars of Religion, the history of Montsoreau is closely linked with the history of the Renaissance in Europe and more specifically with the history of the Renaissance in France. At the end of the Hundred Years' War, Charles VII and Louis XI established the royal power in Chinon, and encouraged or ordered their lords to build new buildings or redevelop old fortresses. Thus began the construction of buildings in a new architectural style in France, giving birth to Renaissance architecture in France. These châteaux will be called later the Châteaux of the Loire Valley. In 1450, Jean II de Chambes, First counselor of Charles VII and ambassador in Venice, bought the fortress of Fulk III to his brother-in-law and destroyed it in order to build a residential palace on the top of the rock of Montsoreau (the Mount Soreau). In an unprecedented move, he built the Château de Montsoreau in a residential-style following Italian architecture of the time making it the first Renaissance building in France. The Château de Montsoreau was directly built on the Loire river bank and remains the only château of the Loire Valley to have been built in the river bed of the Loire.

=== Saint-Bartholomew's Day Massacre ===
Jean IV de Chambes inherited the Château de Montsoreau and saw his lands erected in barony in 1560. Montsoreau is looted by Protestants in 1568; the collegiate Sainte Croix and the fortifications of the city are destroyed. Four years later, on 26 August 1572, Puygaillard sent Jean IV de Chambes the order to eliminate the Huguenots from Saumur, then to do the same in Angers. Four days after Saint Bartholomew's Day Massacre (24 August 1572), Jean de Chambes arrived in Saumur and killed François Bourneau, lieutenant-general of the city. Cruel and ruthless, Jean de Chambes fought at the siege of Lusignan and the capture of Fontenay-le-Comte, and was reigning terror in the region. The Reformed Church of Saumur was almost eliminated. He then went to Angers, closed the gates of the fortifications and began the gathering of Huguenot personalities, all of whom he killed with his own hands. Warned of the abuses and violence of his governor, Charles IX finally sent him a call to order on 14 September 1572. In 1573, his Barony was raised to the rank of County.

=== French Revolution and industrialization ===
On 14 July 1789, during the storming of the Bastille, Yves Marie du Bouchet de Sourches was Count of Montsoreau and owner of the château de Montsoreau. On 11 November 1789, the National constituent assembly decreed that "there will be one municipality in every city, town, parish or community of countryside". Although the French revolution had an important impact on him as the Count of Montsoreau, this impact was far more limited on his property of the château de Montsoreau which remained in his hands until it sold in 1804. The revolution gave way to a period of prosperity for the small town, which was famous since the seventeenth century for the quality of its tuffeau, wines and fruits. The industrialization of stone quarrying was the direct consequence of the extraordinary urban growth, consuming volumes unknown until then. It was made possible, as well as facilitated, by the river, which allowed the intensification of trade and river transport. The tuffeau stone was exported regionally, to cities all along the banks of rivers, Angers, Rennes, Nantes and Le Mans, but also surprisingly as far as the Caribbean. The Ship mills were replaced by Windmills as the population of the small city had almost doubled. The industrialization of the means of production in Montsoreau, and at the same time the transformation of the Fontevraud abbey in a prison on order of Napoleon, transformed the city. At first, the construction of the road from Chinon to Saumur around 1830, which allowed the village to gain land on the Loire, and in a second time in 1896, the construction of the tram line Saumur-Montsoreau-Fontevraud.

=== World War II: The Cadets of Saumur ===
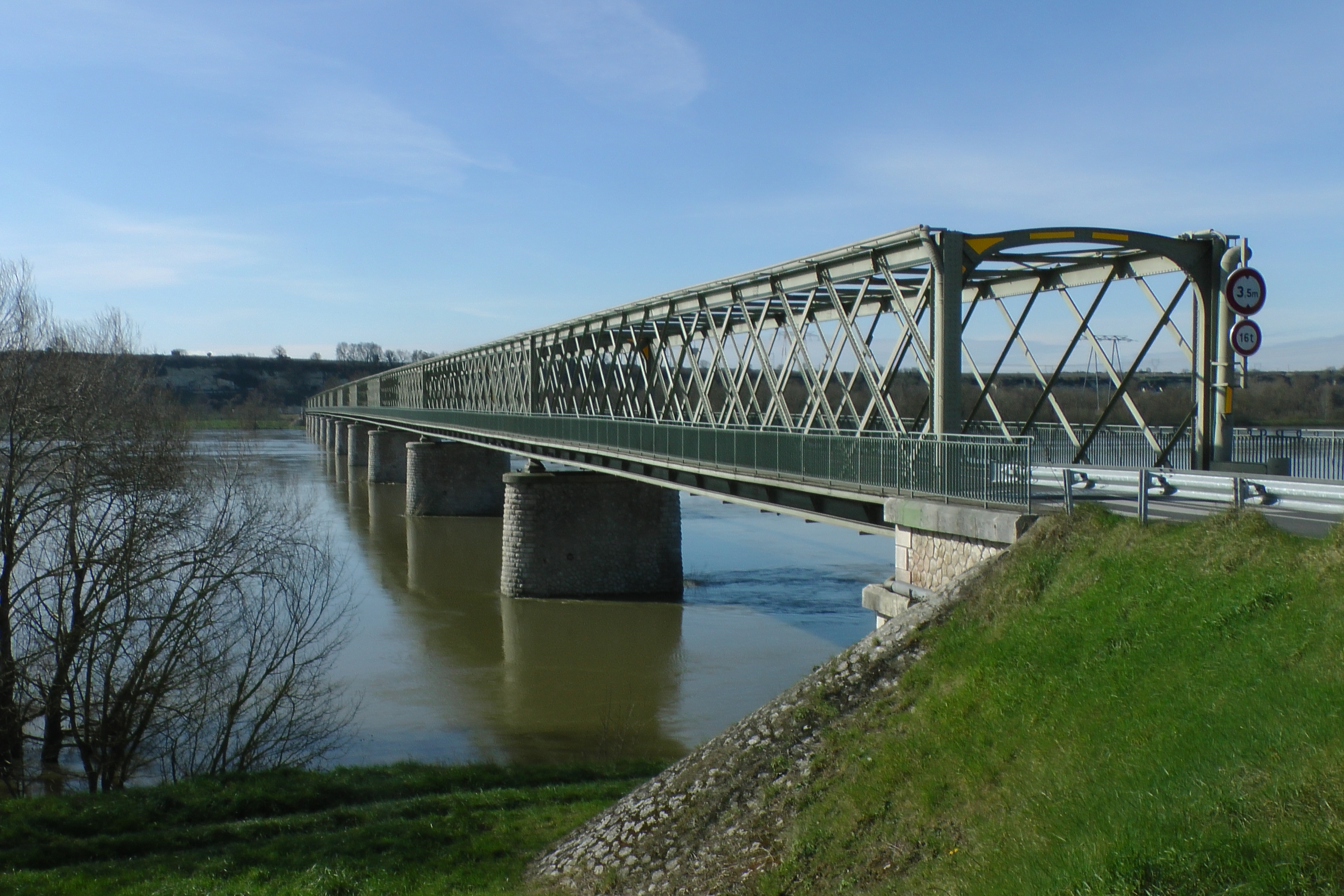
First act of resistance of World War II in France, the night of 18 June 1940, The Cadets de Saumur (cadets de Saumur) blow up the bridges at Montsoreau, Saumur and Gennes.

In Montsoreau, Saumur and Gennes, in June 1940, teenage students of the school of cavalry, still under training and with derisory weapons (including an artillery gun from the school museum), heroically engaged an entire German panzer division for nearly three days. And in doing so became a legend in France. – For Honour Alone, Roy Macnab, January 1989.

The battle of Saumur, is considered as the first act of resistance of World War II in France, the next days following the order of Maréchal Petain to ceasefire on 17 June 1940. Following the German offensive of May 1940, the enemy progressing towards the Seine, the General Weygand, ordered to defend all the rivers likely to block the invasion route to the south. Thus the principle of the defense of the Loire was decided. The National School of Cavalry, commanded by Colonel Michon, was given the area from the confluence of the rivers Vienne and Loire at Montsoreau, to Gennes, a front of 40 kilometers. Marshal Petain gave the order to cease the fighting on 17 June. Colonel Michon considered that the prestige and the honor of the National School of Cavalry obliged him, despite this order, to fight in Saumur and keep the Germans from crossing the Loire (even with extremely limited means). 790 vacant Aspirants of the Cavalry Reserve, trained in Saumur since May 1940 were deployed in 27 brigades on various strategic points. The night of 18 June, their first act of war was to explode the four strategic bridges on the Loire river, one in Montsoreau, two in Saumur and one in Gennes. For three days, about 2,000 men held three German Panzer divisions, with 40,000 men, in failure, with training material, without air support, without hope, but not without panache. To these inexperienced young fighters whom they themselves called Kadetten (the Cadets), the German horsemen, soldiers of tradition, did not take them prisoner and released them paying tribute to their courage. This name remained thereafter.

== Geography ==
=== Location ===
Montsoreau is at the center of the Loire Valley, in north-western France, 160 km (99 mi) from the Atlantic Ocean, and approximately 12 km (7.5 mi) from Saumur, Chinon and Bourgueil. It is situated in southeastern Maine-et-Loire department, approximately halfway between Paris and Bordeaux. The village is at the crossroad of the three main administrative regions of, Pays de la Loire, Centre-Val de Loire, and Nouvelle-Aquitaine, and of the three departments of Maine-et-Loire, Indre-et-Loire, and Vienne.

Montsoreau is part of the Metropolitan Area of Saumur Val de Loire and share borders with municipalities both in the Maine-et-Loire and Indre-et-Loire departments. These municipalities are: Candes-Saint-Martin, Chouzé-sur-Loire, Fontevraud-l'Abbaye, and Turquant.

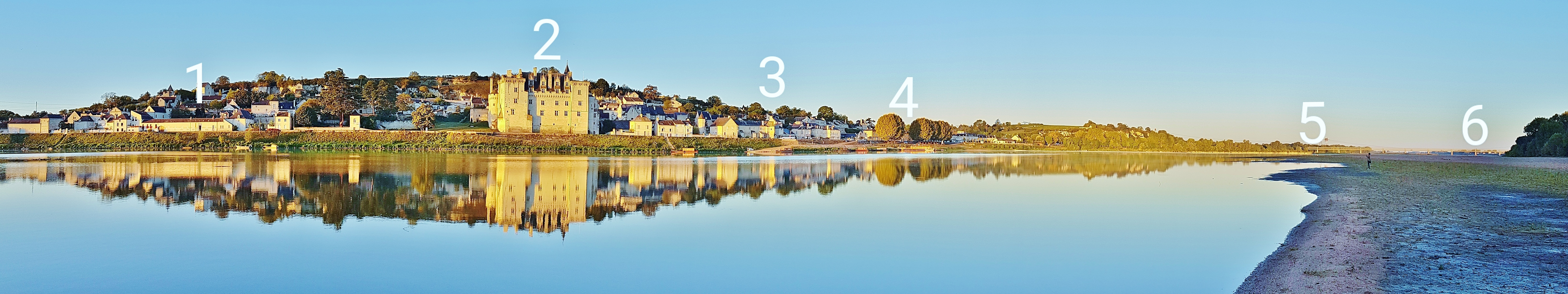
2-mile Montsoreau Skyline Panorama from Quai Alexandre Dumas to Than Island, taken in October 2018 from Than Island, Loire Valley.
1. Jehanne of Arc street
2. Château de Montsoreau-Museum of Contemporary Art
3. quai of the Loire River
4. Vieux-port of Montsoreau
5. Montsoreau Bridge
6. Than Island

=== Hydrology ===
The Loire river, nicknamed the last wild river in Europe, is the longest river in France (1,006 kilometres (625 mi)). It is one of the main tourist attraction in Montsoreau, it reaches here, at the confluence of the Vienne and the Loire rivers, its full width. Downstream, it has already been inflated with waters from the Indre and the Cher rivers. The river bed has considerably changed over centuries, before the great flood of January 1496 the confluence of the rivers Loire and Vienne was in Saumur.

=== Climate ===
The climate of Montsoreau, is characterized by the high sunshine of the Loire Valley, a favorable region for wine and cultivation of fruits. Important oceanic influences as well as the immediate proximity of the Loire river make Montsoreau benefit from a climate called douceur angevine (sweetness of Anjou). This climate has been characterized by Joachim du Bellay in The Regrets (poem 31) as soon as the 16th century. Summer is hot and dry and winter is mild and wet. Precipitation is low to medium during inter-season. The wind is characteristic of the Loire corridor, medium and relatively constant.

Climate data for Montsoreau
Month	Jan	Feb	Mar	Apr	May	Jun	Jul	Aug	Sep	Oct	Nov	Dec	Year
Record high °C (°F)	16.9 (62.4)	20.8 (69.4)	23.7 (74.7)	29.2 (84.6)	31.8 (89.2)	36.7 (98.1)	37.5 (99.5)	39.8 (103.6)	34.5 (94.1)	29.0 (84.2)	22.3 (72.1)	18.5 (65.3)	39.8 (103.6)
Mean daily maximum °C (°F)	11.1 (52.0)	12.1 (53.8)	15.1 (59.2)	17.4 (63.3)	22.5 (72.5)	27 (81)	26.4 (79.5)	27.2 (81.0)	21.6 (70.9)	19.9 (67.8)	12.7 (54.9)	9.2 (48.6)	19.2 (66.6)
Daily mean °C (°F)	6.2 (43.2)	8.2 (46.8)	10.8 (51.4)	10.9 (51.6)	16.5 (61.7)	20.6 (69.1)	20.8 (69.4)	21.4 (70.5)	16.5 (61.7)	15 (59)	8.5 (47.3)	5.9 (42.6)	14.1 (57.4)
Mean daily minimum °C (°F)	8.8 (47.8)	4 (39)	6.5 (43.7)	4.5 (40.1)	10.6 (51.1)	14.2 (57.6)	15.3 (59.5)	15.3 (59.5)	11.2 (52.2)	10.2 (50.4)	4.4 (39.9)	2.6 (36.7)	9.0 (48.2)
Average precipitation mm (inches)	66 (2.6)	35 (1.4)	50 (2.0)	3.5 (0.14)	45 (1.8)	51 (2.0)	27 (1.1)	15.5 (0.61)	34 (1.3)	11.5 (0.45)	29 (1.1)	40 (1.6)	411 (16.2)
Average snowy days	1.7	1.9	1.4	0.2	0.1	0.0	0.0	0.0	0.0	0.0	0.4	1.3	7.0
Average relative humidity (%)	88	84	80	77	77	75	74	76	80	86	89	89	81.3
Mean monthly sunshine hours	69.9	90.3	144.2	178.5	205.6	228	239.4	236.4	184.7	120.6	67.7	59.2	1,824.5
Source 1: Climatologie mensuelle à la station de Montreuil-Bellay.
Source 2: Infoclimat.fr (humidity, snowy days 1961–1990)

=== Protected areas ===
Montsoreau has a long heritage with historical, urban, natural and architectural dimensions. The small city is part of the Loire Valley UNESCO World Heritage Site; Montsoreau has some architecturally important buildings that were built in a wide variety of styles across different timeframes. The construction of the Montsoreau bridge at the beginning of the 20th century completely altered the link the village had with the river, and modernized Montsoreau. It remains nowadays one of the longest bridges in France.

==== Natural areas ====
===== Sensitive natural area of the Loire Valley =====
The ENS Loire Valley encompasses the Loire and its right bank, as well as part of the village of Monsoreau and vineyards of the left bank. This ENS is characterized by the presence of many species and habitats of species of interest and/or protected at national or regional level. It is represented by the banks, the islands, the alluvial woods and the bed of the Loire river. It is threatened by the increase in the area of poplar plantations and crops, the lowering of the riverbed, the abandonment of the hydraulic annexes and the invasive species.

===== Natura 2000 area of the Loire Valley from Montsoreau to Ponts-de-Cé =====
The Natura 2000 Loire Valley includes two areas at Montsoreau, one dedicated to the Loire river itself, and another one dedicated to the valley:

- The ZSC (Special Conservation Area) Loire Valley Ponts-de-Cé Montsoreau (FR 5200629) site includes the wild part of the Loire river and part of its valley alluvial. The major interest of the site resides in the peripheral areas of the river, including the burrows and other aquatic environments rich in hydrophilic vegetation, mesophilic grasslands with hygrophilous, riparian woodland and ash Grove oxyphile.
- The ZPS (Special Protection Area) Loire Valley Ponts-de-Cé Loire Valley (FR 5212003): the site encompasses the alluvial valley of the Loire and its main annexes (valleys, marshes, hillsides, and cliffs). The mosaic of environments that are very favorable to birds (strikes, natural meadows, hedgerows, marsh and aquatic environments, wooded lawns ...) is characterized by the geographical and climatic context which induces strong and irregular variations of flow, from the low water level pronounced to very large floods.

===== Loire-Anjou-Touraine Regional Natural Park =====
The headquarters of the Loire-Anjou-Touraine Regional Nature Park (Parc naturel régional Loire-Anjou-Touraine) is located in Montsoreau. It was created in 1996 and brings together 141 municipalities located in the Center region and in the Pays-de-la-Loire region. The missions of the Park are the protection and management of the natural and cultural heritage, development of the territory, economic and social development, reception, education and training, and experimentation and research.

==== Architectural Heritage ====
===== UNESCO =====
Montsoreau and the Château de Montsoreau are part of the UNESCO listed World Heritage Site of the Loire Valley between Sully-sur-Loire and Chalonnes. It has been listed under three criteria:

Criterion (i): The Loire Valley is noteworthy for the quality of its architectural heritage, in its historic towns such as Blois, Chinon, Orléans, Saumur, and Tours, but in particular in its world-famous castles, such as the Château de Chambord.

Criterion (ii): The Loire Valley is an outstanding cultural landscape along a major river which bears witness to an interchange of human values and to a harmonious development of interactions between human beings and their environment over two millennia.

Criterion (iv): The landscape of the Loire Valley, and more particularly its many cultural monuments, illustrate to an exceptional degree the ideals of the Renaissance and the Age of the Enlightenment on western European thought and design. – UNESCO.

===== Monuments Historiques =====
Monument Historique is a classification given to some National Heritage Sites in France. This classification is also a protection, which is of two levels, a Monument Historique can be Classified (classé) or Inscribed (inscrit), Classified means the building is of National importance and Inscribed means it is of Regional importance. In Montsoreau, seven buildings are Inscribed, including the church. The Château is the only Classified building. There is a protected area of 500m perimeter all around a monument historique, in this area new buildings and modifications of the old building must be authorized by the Architect of the Buildings of France (architecte des bâtiments de France).

The seven listed buildings are:

- La Pierrelée: The Pierrelée dolmen is a prehistoric megalithic construction, consisting of blocks of stone partly covered by a tumulus. Its use is uncertain, it could have been a burial place, but also a dwelling.
- Saint-Pierre de Rest Church: Inscribed in 1952, is a Twelfth, thirteenth and eighteenth century church formerly built in the Loire River bed. Saint-Peter is the patron saint of fishermen.
- Château de Montsoreau: Classified in 1862 like Château de Fontainebleau, Les Invalides and Château Gaillard. Only 57 châteaux on this second list established under Prosper Mérimée supervision.
- House fifteenth century (Quai de la Loire): Inscribed in 1952, the staircase tower and the north facade have been listed.
- House seventeenth century (Quai de la Loire): Inscribed in 1952, the exterior staircase and the south facade have been listed.
- House sixteenth century (Rue Joan of Arc): Inscribed in 1926, the fireplace of the sixteenth century has been listed.
- Windmill of the Trench: Inscribed in 1978, is a polygonal eighteenth-century windmill.

==== Urban Areas ====
===== Petites Cités de Caractère =====
Montsoreau is listed on the Petites Cités de Caractère, a distinction given to villages or towns of less than 6,000 inhabitants, whose agglomeration must be protected by Bâtiments de France and have a structure dense enough to give it the appearance of a city, hold an architectural heritage of quality and homogeneity, and exercise or have exercised urban functions of centrality or have a concentration of buildings resulting from a present or past activity with a strong identity. The municipality must have a multi-year program for the rehabilitation and enhancement of heritage.

===== The Most Beautiful Villages of France =====
Montsoreau is part of The Most Beautiful Villages of France (Les Plus Beaux Villages de France). Les Plus Beaux Villages de France is an association grouping 172 villages (as of 2022) considered as the most beautiful among the 32,000 villages of France. A selection committee studies the applications for membership submitted by the mayors of the municipalities concerned. The village must have less than 2000 inhabitants, have at least two historic monuments, and have a policy of preservation of the landscape which must be materialized in urban planning documents. Since July 2012, the association is part of the association The Most Beautiful Villages of the World.

== Population ==
Historical population

Year	Pop.	±% p.a.
1793	746	—
1800	778	+0.60%
1806	790	+0.26%
1821	867	+0.62%
1831	987	+1.30%
1836	986	−0.02%
1841	1,019	+0.66%
1846	1,071	+1.00%
1851	1,097	+0.48%
1856	937	−3.10%
1861	921	−0.34%
1866	851	−1.57%
1872	790	−1.23%
1876	752	−1.22%
1881	688	−1.76%
1886	655	−0.98%
1891	619	−1.12%
1896	584	−1.16%
1901	528	−2.00%

Year	Pop.	±% p.a.
1906	494	−1.32%
1911	515	+0.84%
1921	452	−1.30%
1926	425	−1.22%
1931	425	+0.00%
1936	432	+0.33%
1946	504	+1.55%
1954	566	+1.46%
1962	570	+0.09%
1968	547	−0.68%
1975	503	−1.19%
1982	449	−1.61%
1990	561	+2.82%
1999	544	−0.34%
2007	493	−1.22%
2012	465	−1.16%
2017	446	−0.83%
2023	408	−1.47%

Source: EHESS and INSEE

The demography of Montsoreau depends a lot on the activity of the town itself, second homes, and retirees. Montsoreau economy is centered on tourism, and agriculture, the number of its inhabitants is limited by the geographical constraints, the density of its habitat, and the fact that one part of the land of the city is devoted to the cultivation of Vines, and the agricultural facilities of winemakers (warehouses, winery, Wine cellars). However, the real estate pressure is relatively important in Montsoreau, it results from the high levels of protection of urban planning rules due to the different territorial classifications (UNESCO, National, Regional and Departmental), and leads naturally to an increase of the real estate prices.

== Economy ==
Montsoreau economy is divided between tourism, agriculture, and commerce. Montsoreau host the headquarters of a public administration, the Regional Natural Park Loire-Anjou-Touraine, which is the largest employer of Montsoreau. In 2019, with a museum of contemporary art, 17 restaurants, a campsite and two hotels, tourism is the largest employer of the municipality and helps the development of commercial jobs.

=== City economic overview ===
==== Quickfacts ====
Montsoreau, Nantes, Angers, Lyon, Marseille and Paris compared to France
2015 Census	Montsoreau	Nantes	Angers	Lyon	Marseille	Paris	France
Total population 2015	439	303,382	151,520	513,275	861,635	2,206,488	66,190,280
Population change, 2010 to 2015	−1.8%	+1.3%	+0.5%	+1.2%	+0.3%	−0.3%	+0.5%
Population density (people/sqmi)	219.1	12,053.3	9,188.3	10,722.3	9,274.5	20,934.4	270.9
Median household income (2015)	€19,846	€21,263	€19,194	€22,501	€18,131	€26,431	€20,566
Unemployment rate	12.7%	17.0%	20.7%	13.9%	18.5%	12.2%	14.2%
Primary residence rate	60.5%	90.2%	90.2%	87.8%	89.5%	83.6%	82.5%
Second home rate	22.7%	3.5%	2.2%	3.8%	2.9%	8.2%	9.5%
Enterprises (units)	71	33,943	13,064	73,767	88,059	546,320	6,561,692
Business density (business/1000 people)	161.7	111.9	86.2	143.7	102.2	247.6	99.1

==== Business density ====
Montsoreau is economically linked to tourism, and geographically limited in its development, there is a proliferation of small businesses, which create a very favorable environment for the development of these companies. The Business density, is a figure that measures the economic environment, and is, particularly in France, linked to the number of small businesses present in a territory. The higher this figure is, the better the environment is for business. Montsoreau is well above the French average with a density almost twice the French average business density, ahead of almost all the largest French cities except Paris.

=== Tourism ===
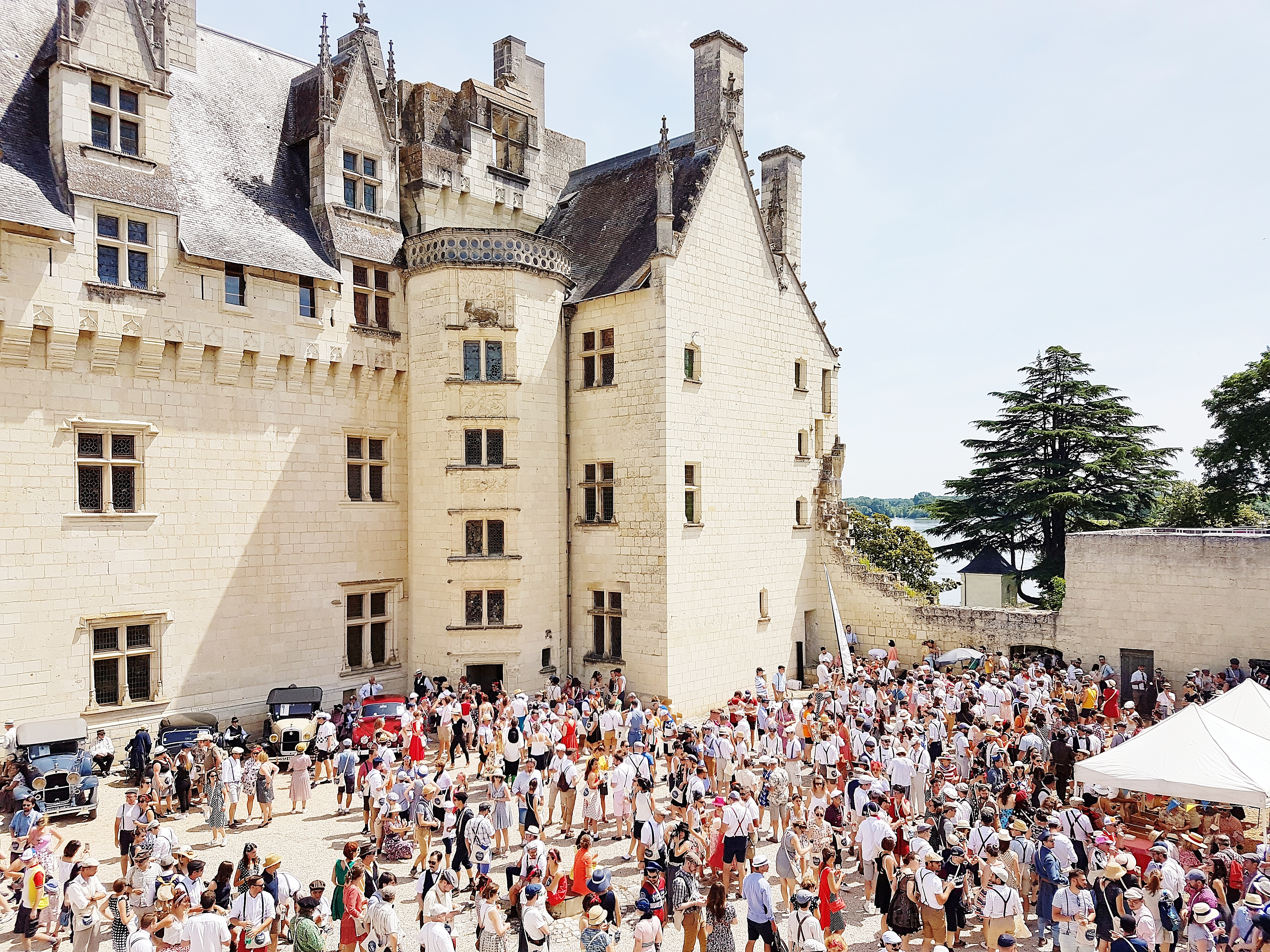
Château de Montsoreau-Museum of Contemporary Art courtyard during the Anjou Vélo Vintage festival.

The identity of the village is borne by the château of Montsoreau, which gave its name to the village. The installation of a museum of contemporary art in the first Renaissance palace in France, combining "radical Renaissance architecture with a dramatic presence in the natural landscape". Tourism in Montsoreau supports a large number of small businesses, linked to catering and tourist reception. The hotel industry is represented by traditional hotels and an outdoor camping offer. However, in recent years, a multiplicity of rental accommodations offers through websites such as Airbnb has developed in Montsoreau and surrounding cities. It allows the village to adapt to the organization of major events gathering a large crowd like Montsoreau Flea Market, Fireworks display on 14 July or Château de Montsoreau – Museum of Contemporary Art events.

=== Wine and agriculture ===
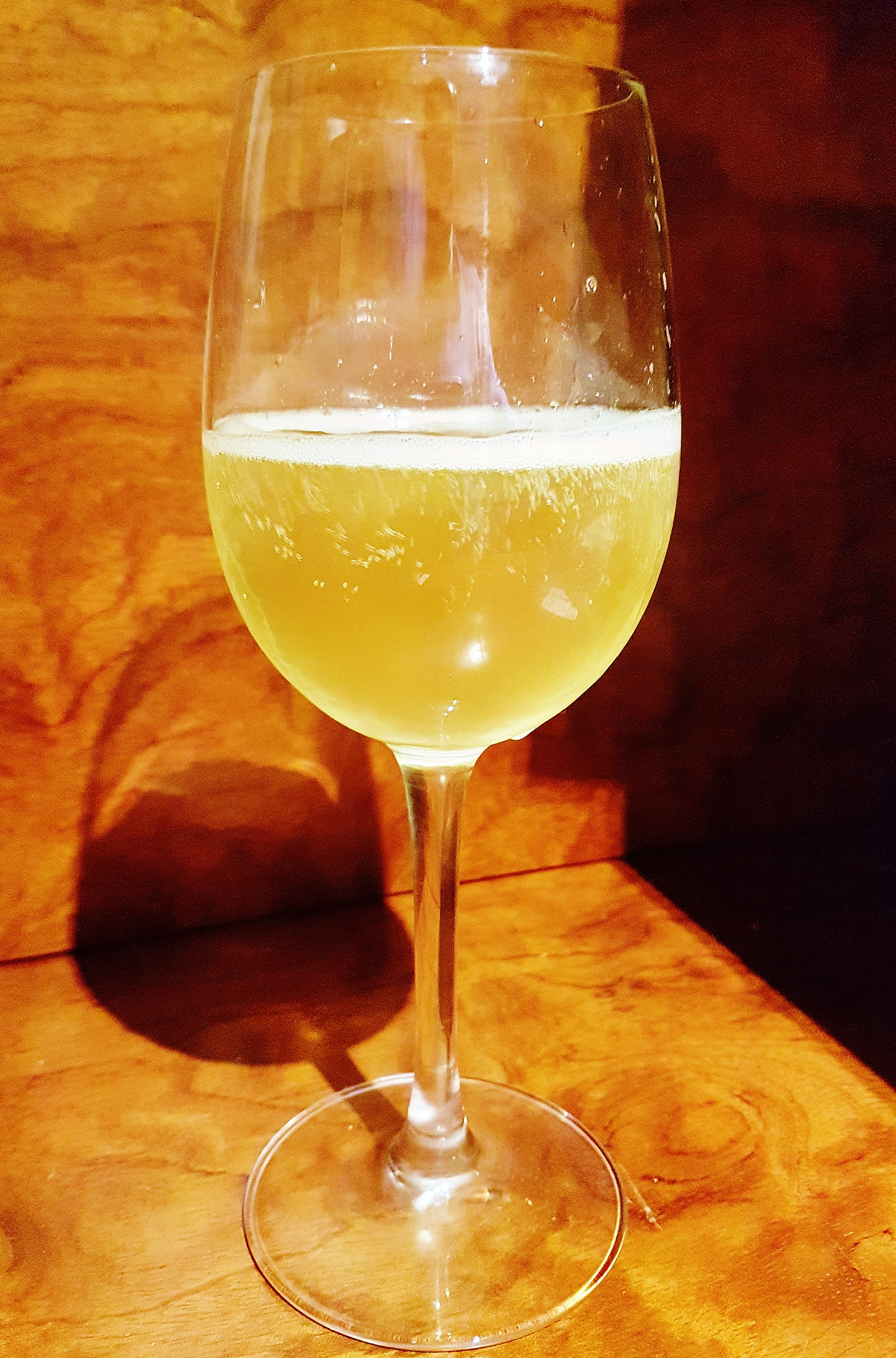
Bulco, a Sparkling Natural Wine from Gérard Marula, Loire Valley

Montsoreau is in the heart of the Loire valley wine region which stretches, from Nantes to Orleans; from Sancerre and Pouilly-Fumé to the vineyards of Muscadet. While the region is mainly dedicated to white wines production, Montsoreau is part of the appellation Coteaux de Saumur and surrounded by five appélation d'origine controlée, Chinon, Saumur-Champigny, Saint-Nicolas de Bourgueil, Bourgueil, Anjou and Touraine, which are mainly producing red wines and crémant sparkling wines.

=== Enotourism and Anjou Vélo Vintage Festival ===
Enotourism or Oenotourism is a relatively new, fully growing, tourism in Montsoreau. From the beginning of the 2010s, the Grand Saumurois, which includes Montsoreau, began to build offers of sports tourism combining hiking, cycling and wine tastings, and more specifically a winemaker from Montsoreau (Denis Rétiveau) became also a Loire sailor to combine wine tastings and sailing. In 2010, the creation of Anjou Vélo Vintage, a vintage festival of bike rides, disguised, throughout the territory of Saumur combined with wine tastings is an immediate success. Its 2018 edition attracted more than 50,000 participants.

== Culture and contemporary life ==
=== Arts ===
La Dame de Monsoreau, Emile Chautard, 1913.

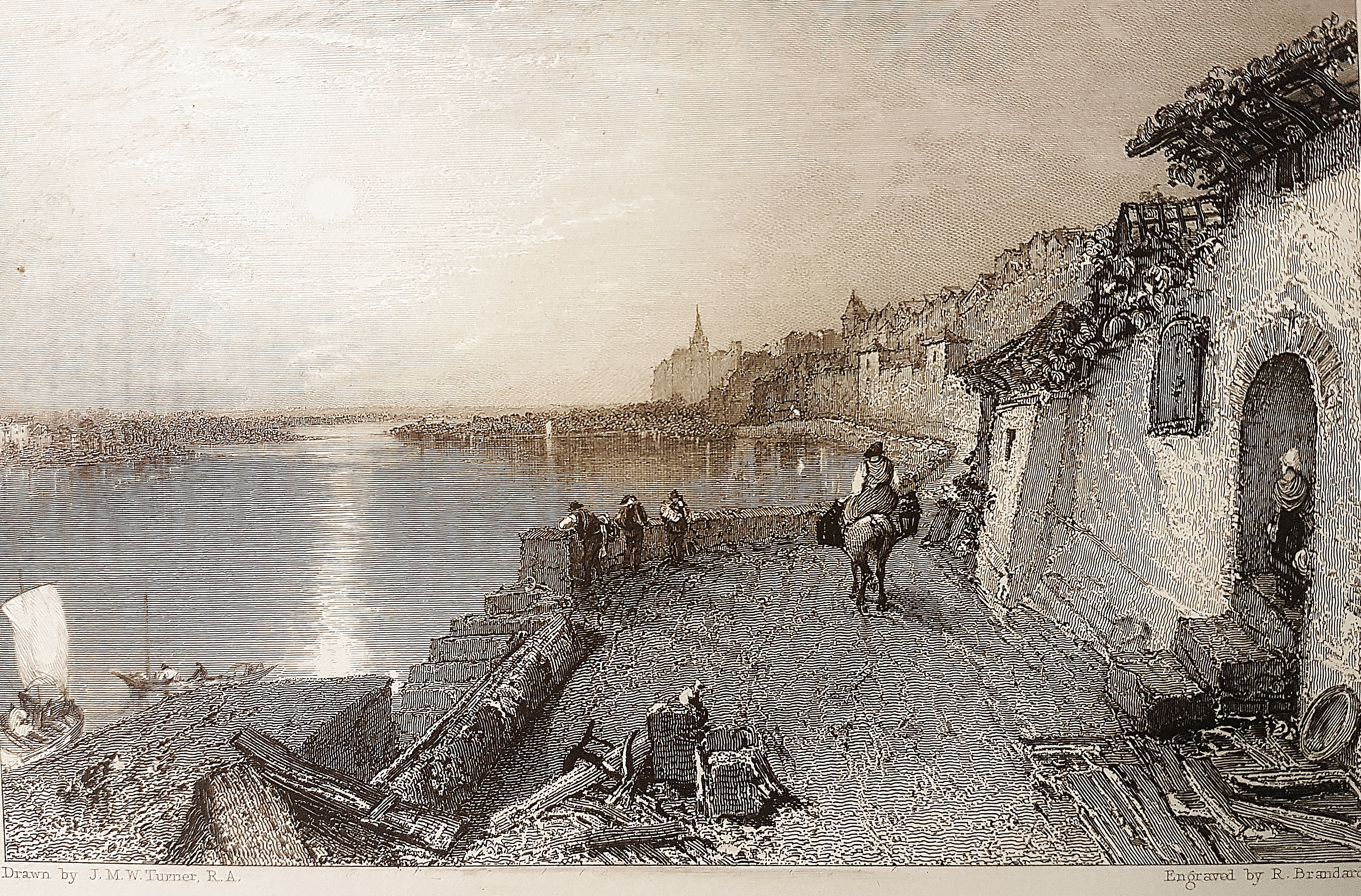
J.M.W. Turner, Rietz near Saumur 1826, engraved by Brandard, Château de Montsoreau-Museum of Contemporary Art. Showing a sunset on the Loire river with the Vieux-port of Montsoreau, the new road and the château.

Montsoreau is one of the few cities in France to have experienced the Renaissance as early as 1450 through architecture with the construction of its château at first, and then of civilian buildings. These buildings are still visible in the city. In the mid-fifteenth century, as the kings of France were settling their power in Chinon and then Langeais and Tours, many artists such as Pierre de Ronsard, François Rabelais and Jean Fouquet, among the most famous, established at that time their residence in the heart of what later became known as the Loire Valley and the Châteaux de la Loire. François Rabelais who spent his childhood next to Chinon and Montsoreau, at La Devinière, knew the château de Montsoreau as it is today and gave an idea of the importance of Montsoreau then mentioning it several times in his masterpiece narrating the life of Gargantua and Pantagruel. But it is really only with romantic artists that Montsoreau became famous internationally. In 1826, J. M. W. Turner during his trip in the Loire Valley immortalized the confluence of the Vienne and Loire with the château and the village (Rietz near Saumur, watercolor on paper, Ashmolean Museum, Oxford which has been engraved by R. Brandard in 1832), followed by Auguste Rodin and Alexandre Dumas. Alexandre Dumas' Dame de Monsoreau, part of a trilogy, is one of his most famous novel, published in 1846 (serialized), translated in more than six languages and distributed worldwide. This novel has been adapted three times for cinema, as early as 1909 by Mario Caserini, three times for television in the form of a series, and also adapted for a comics book series. One opera and one play have also been written and played, and a variety of roses named after La Dame de Montsoreau has been hybridized by Christopher H. Warner in 2000.

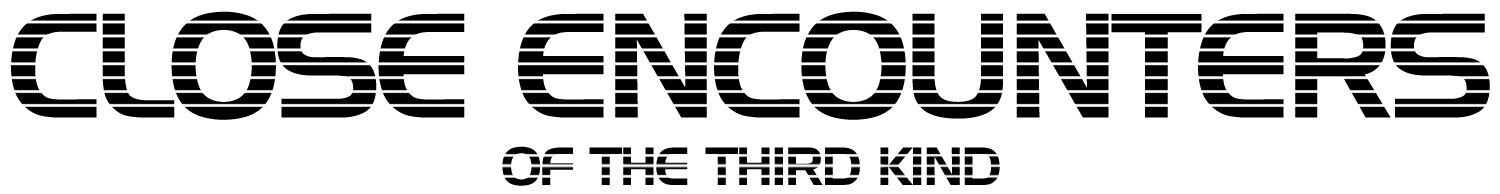
Close Encounters of the Third Kind Logo

More recently, a news item in July 1966, an observation of a UFO in Montsoreau, in a field for long minutes, and the discovery five days later of traces of the device in question, attracted attention and journalists from all over France. This even to the point of attracting the attention of national and international experts such as Jacques Vallée, Montsoreau became the case 783 in his novel Passport to Magonia. Jacques Vallée and American filmmaker Steven Spielberg met during the writing of Close Encounters of the Third Kind screenplay in 1977. They paid a homage to the Montsoreau case introducing Lacombe in the very first scene of the film (character of Jacques Vallée played by François Truffaut), as an international French expert having been one of the key speakers at the Montsoreau Conference.

==== Contemporary art ====
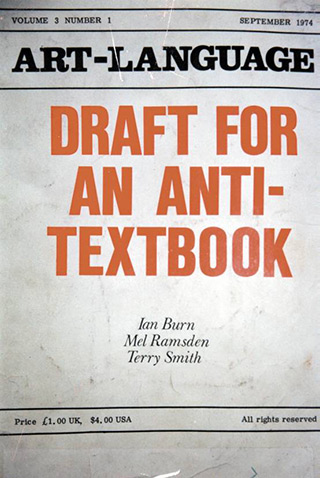
Art & Language, Art-Language Vol.3 Nr.1, 1974, Collection Philippe Méaille, Château de Montsoreau-Museum of Contemporary Art.

The Château de Montsoreau-Museum of contemporary art project begins in November 2014. In June 2015, Philippe Méaille and Christian Gillet create a surprise in France, jointly announcing the signing of an emphyteutic lease (between the Maine-et-Loire department and Philippe Méaille) on the Château de Montsoreau property. The Château de Montsoreau-Museum of Contemporary Art becoming the first Château of the Loire Valley to be transformed into a museum of contemporary art. Despite the desire of both parties to create an international museum of contemporary art, and the ability from Méaille to endowing it with the world's largest collection of works by the radical conceptualists of Art & Language, and to seize the opportunity to develop the international tourist audience of the Loire Valley, the announcement creates controversy. Frédéric Béatse, former mayor of Angers, and socialist political leader, protests against what he calls « a sale of a jewel of the department to a private foreign player ». The two municipal elected officials, Gérard Persin, and Christian Gillet both react very quickly to these protests during a press conference, Gérard Persin stating: « It is a pride to have been chosen to host a center of contemporary art of international stature ». Christian Gillet for his part, by putting the project in its international ambition and potential development for the territory: « The idea of Philippe Méaille, connoisseur and lover of the site, is to install a center of contemporary art featuring his collection, already world famous and renowned, we have considered an interesting challenge », and Méaille to clarify his intentions: « This public-private partnership appeared to us as an innovative solution that will be integrated into the Saumur territory in its entirety: Saumur and its agglomeration but also the nearby Fontevraud Abbey ».

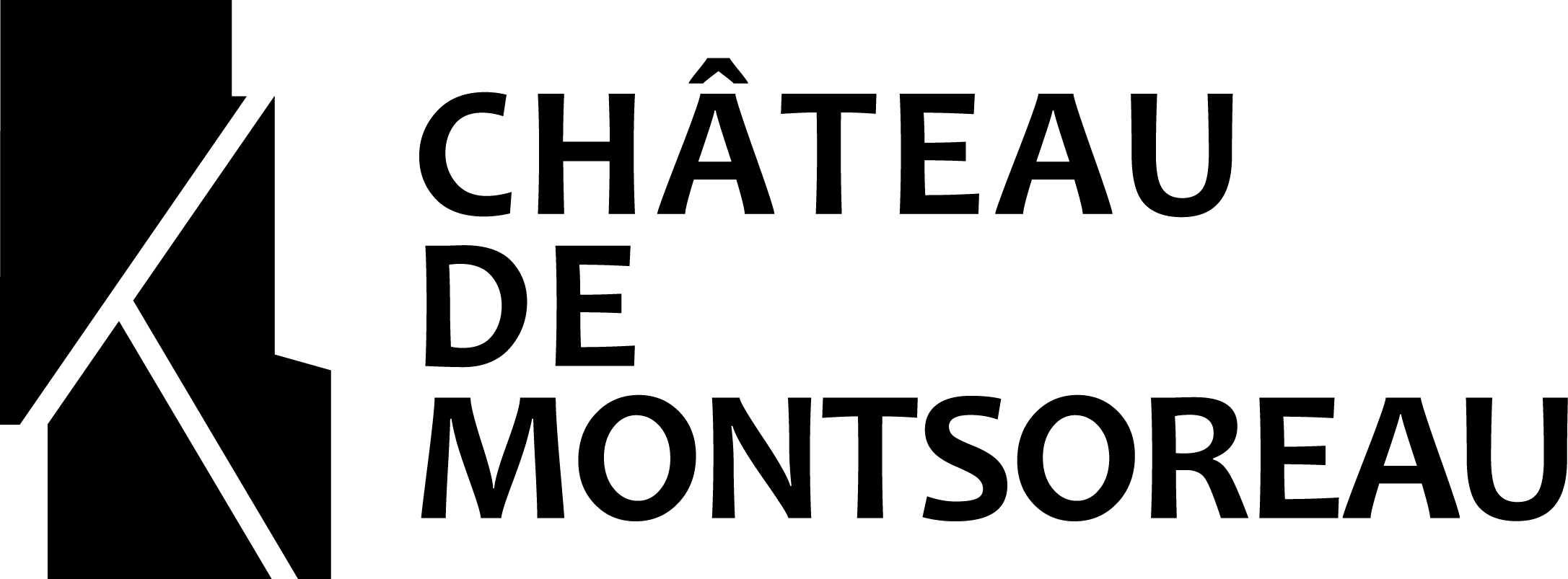
Château de Montsoreau-Museum of Contemporary Art Visual Identity

After a phase of work over a period of eight months, the Château de Montsoreau-Museum of Contemporary Art opened on 8 April 2016, the city of Montsoreau becoming one of the smallest urban units in France to have a private museum of contemporary art. The development and urban planning of the château de la loire, the history of the Loire Valley and a collection of contemporary art were a case study for the 58 students of the École Camondo during the 2015–2016 academic year. This phase of work was also accompanied by a phase of building a new identity, from the metamorphosis of a historical heritage site into a cultural place entirely dedicated to contemporary art. This new visual identity was partly built through the creation of a logo, iconic signal of this one, this phase was carried out thanks to a process of co-creation engaging at the same time the team of the Château de Montsoreau-Museum of Contemporary Art and students from TALM School of Arts and Design to « rethink a cultural site as a space for social interaction ».

This change of identity of the château operated in parallel with an urban vision of the project, had a strong impact on the presence of the château de Montsoreau-Museum of Contemporary Art in the city of Montsoreau. First of all, during the Loire Valley Biennale, access to the château gardens was redesigned, giving way to a wild garden in honor of Miriam Rothschild, they became free and integrated into the urban route. And then, the Château de Montsoreau-Museum of Contemporary Art has reopened its historic port and set up an offer of cruises between Saumur and Montsoreau, to highlight the Loire river as an obvious tourist connection between the different cities of the Saumur agglomeration. This port is also a communication lever for the Château de Montsoreau-Museum of Contemporary Art for the production of promotional films when loaning works to other institutions, giving birth for example to a short action film in the style of Mission: Impossible during its collaboration with the Contemporary Art center in Tours.

Montsoreau benefited from international media coverage after the declaration of independence of Catalonia in October 2017. One part of the Philippe Méaille collection was, since 2010, under a long-term loan agreement at MACBA (Museum of Contemporary Art of Barcelona). Two days after the declaration of independence by Carles Puigdemont, Méaille released a statement from the château de Montsoreau-Museum of contemporary art not to renew his loan to the Catalan institution. There followed a controversy, despite his statements about a lack of political position of his gesture.

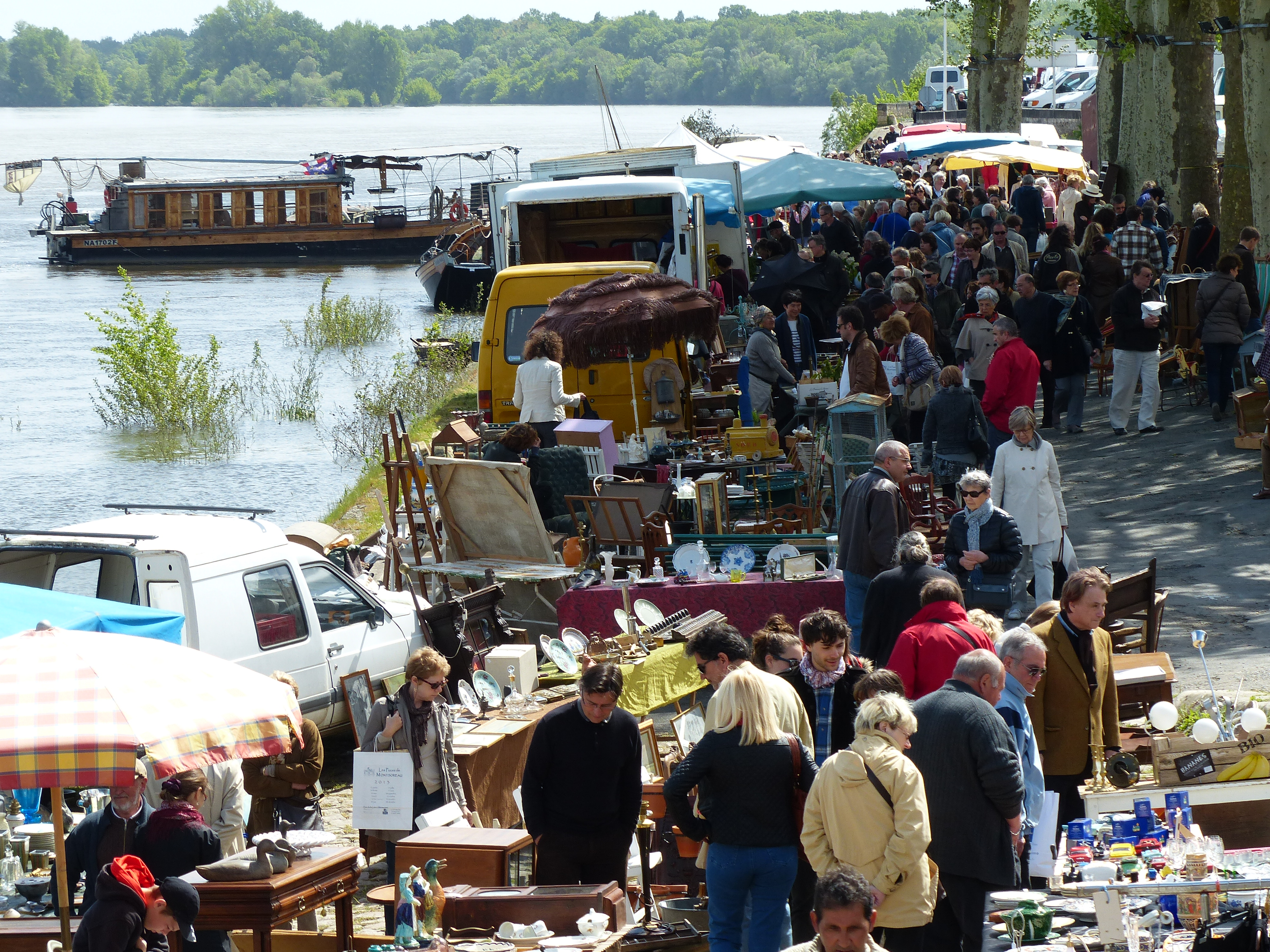
Les puces de Montsoreau is bringing in the Loire Valley some 10,000 visitors every second Sundays of the month.

==== Performing arts and events ====
Performing arts are essentially events in Montsoreau, centered on three places, which are the vieux-port, the Saint-Peter church and the Château de Montsoreau-Museum of Contemporary Art. This event activity is seasonal and also related to calendar holidays. The Musical Season of Montsoreau was created by the famous harpsichordist Mario Raskin in 1996. It takes place from late July to mid-August and is a festival of European classical music covering music from the Renaissance to the present day. 15 August is the day of the traditional Picnic Castle Montsoreau-Museum of Contemporary Art for which all residents are invited, it is followed by a concert and a public release of sky lanterns at night that brings together more than 2000 participants.

The most successful event taking place in Montsoreau is the flea market of Montsoreau listed amongst the best flea markets, which in a few years has become the largest flea market in the Loire Valley. It takes place every second Sunday of every month and attracts more than 10,000 visitors per event.

Every year since 2025, the keys to the city have been symbolically handed over to the Loire during a ceremony aboard a traditional boat, a pioneering initiative campaigning for recognition of the Loire's legal rights.

=== Wine and cuisine ===
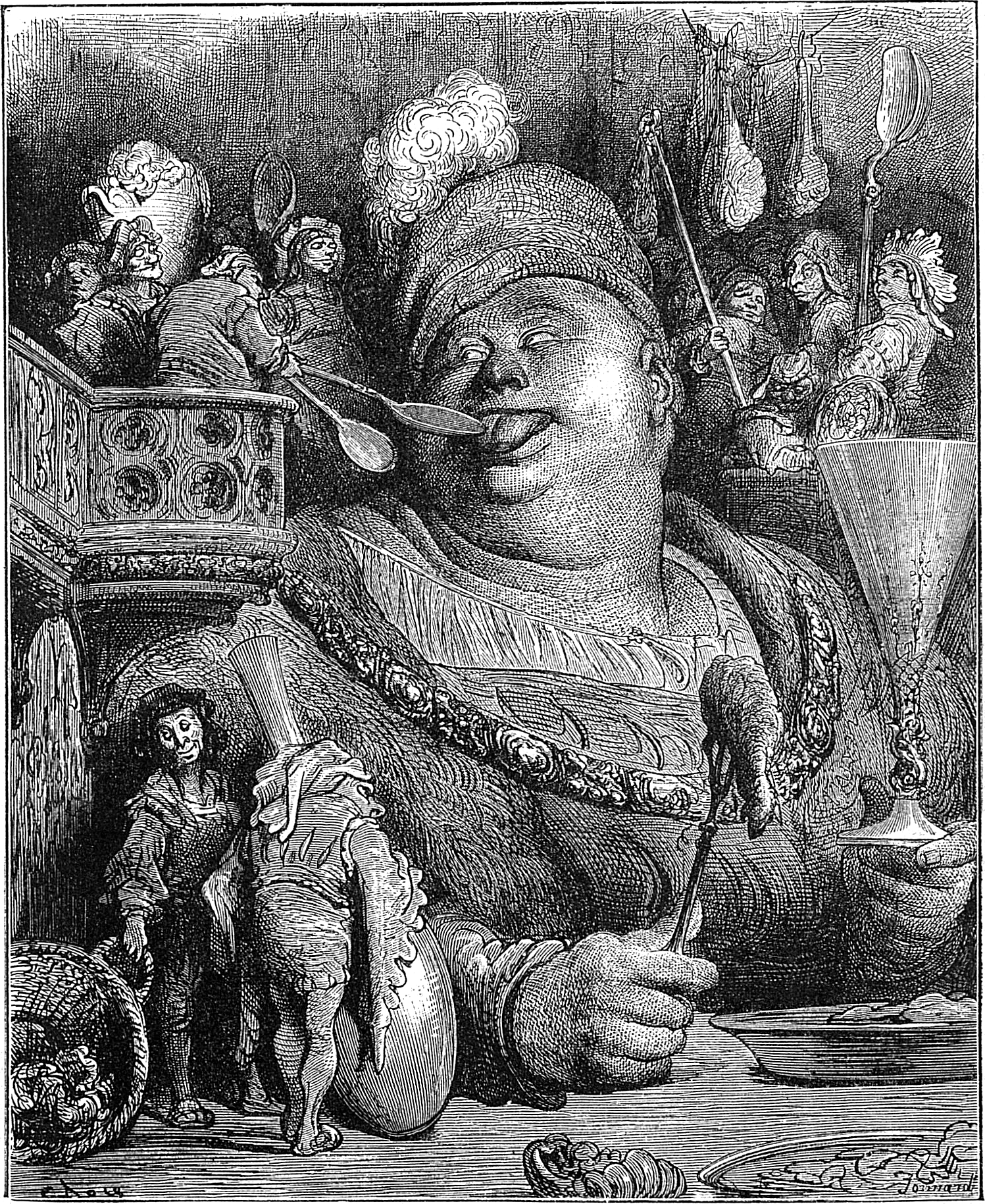
Russian edition of Gargantua

Historically, the vines and the culture of the wine were brought on site, in Nantes, by the Romans in the 1st century. Montsoreau is in the heart of the so-called Rabelaisie, Rabelaisian part of the Loire Valley, that is to say, along the Loire river between Saumur and Chinon. Locally, the image which predominates is that of Rabelais and its giant Gargantua. This image makes reference to Gargantua, with his plethoric meals, the quantities of wines ingested and even to Rabelais who is said to have written his main books by dictation during his meals. But according to Pierre Beaudry, to be Rabelaisian means also:

to be totally outrageous, raunchy, crude in every way, absolutely stubborn in matters of truth, relentless against hypocrisy, and against all forms of popular opinion; but, also, in a more profound way, it means AXIOM BUSTING.

— Pierre Beaudry, Fidelio Magazine, Vol. IX Nr. 4, Winter 2000

==== Wine ====
Montsoreau is located on the south bank of the Loire river, and is surrounded to the south, east and west by the vineyards of Saumur, Bourgueil and Chinon. Traditionally, the Loire represents the northern limit of red wine production in Europe, the river providing the few additional degrees necessary for the maturity of the grapes during the grape harvest. Nowadays these wines are very famous for their quality winemakers having made, from the end of the 90's, enormous efforts to minimize the use of chemicals in their vineyards and wines, the Maine-et-Loire becoming the France's capital of what today is called natural wines.

==== Cuisine ====
Montsoreau is a city whose composition has evolved, and the opening to tourism in the late nineteenth century, first created blends with national culinary traditions. From Angevine tradition, its cuisine has gradually become French, evidenced by the presence in the territory of Saumur Val de Loire three Michelin star restaurants and a large concentration of gastronomic restaurants. Val de loire is known as the garden of France, and the cuisine takes advantage of local products that are many, whether fruit or vegetables, with Montsoreau mushroom specialties (soups, mushrooms farçis), asparagus or the traditional Montsorelian beef which is served during the Saint-John's Eve. 15 restaurants and a truck-food are located in the town of Montsoreau, around the château and on the banks of the Loire river, their influencies are from Brittany, India, Italy, United States, France or Anjou.

=== Sports ===
There is no tradition of professional sports in Montsoreau, but the village is very well known for soft sports or sports tourism. The soft sports allow to associate two contradictory states, sport and idleness, and there too, Montsoreau has become a privileged route for the amateurs of the Loire by bike, of excursions in canoë, kayak or backpacking. Another sport, or game, that illustrates this idea, the Bowl of Big (Boule de fort), recently listed intangible cultural heritage by the Ministry of Culture of France.

==== Loire by Bike ====
The Loire by Bike (Loire à Vélo) is a 900 kilometres (560 mi) bicycle route that follows the banks of the Loire river, crossing the 280 kilometres (170 mi) of the UNESCO listed Loire valley. Montsoreau is a major stage of the Loire à Vélo, being located just at the confluence of the Vienne and the Loire rivers, and after the Cher and the Indre rivers have thrown into the Loire, it is the village from which the Loire river reaches its full width. It is also from Montsoreau that tourists can choose to follow the banks of the Loire, the vineyard road, or the troglodytes road.

==== Boule de Fort ====
The Bowl of Big (Boule de Fort) is a traditional sport or game of historical Anjou. First played outdoors in the fifteenth century, it is modernized in the 60s, and practiced nowadays indoors on synthetic resin tracks. Long maintained as private clubs, Bowl of Big clubs are now open to all participants. The Bowl of Big field of Montsoreau is located in a building that replaced the old marketplace located next to the château.

== Transportation ==
=== River Crossings ===
Montsoreau is located downstream from the confluences with the main tributaries of the Loire. These tributaries having inflated the river bed, the Loire reaches its full width at Montsoreau, which has implications for the crossing from one bank to another and explains the exceptional length of the bridge of Montsoreau, which is the 174st longer bridge of France. It connects the South Shore on which Montsoreau is built to the North Shore, cities like Saumur and Loudun, to cities like Tours, Langeais, Chinon, Rigny-Ussé and Azay-le-Rideau. Inaugurated in 1917, it witnessed the first act of resistance of World War II and was partially destroyed. Being an important crossing point, it was rebuilt identically immediately after.

Upstream of Montsoreau, i.e. upstream from the confluence of the Vienne and Loire rivers, access to Montsoreau is made by crossing two bridges, that of Bourgueil to cross the Loire, and that of Candes-Saint-Martin to cross the Vienne.

== Administration and governance ==
Montsoreau is a commune of the Loire Valley in the Maine-et-Loire département, Pays de la Loire région. The commune is part of the Communauté d'agglomération Saumur Val de Loire, an intercommmunal structure which is gathering 45 communes and 100,000 inhabitants.

The city is administered by a mayor and 10 councillors, elected every six years. The current mayor of Montsoreau is Jacky Marchand, who was elected on 25 May 2020.

Saumur Val de Loire administers urban planning, transport, public areas, waste disposal, energy, water, housing, higher education, economic development, employment and European topics, and Montsoreau city council administers security, primary and secondary education, early childhood, social aid, culture, sport and health. These mandates have been stated by the law NOTRE (Loi portant Nouvelle Organisation Territoriale de la République).

== See also ==
- Communes of the Maine-et-Loire department
