= Montsoreau Flea Market =

Montsoreau Flea Market Les Puces de Montsoreau
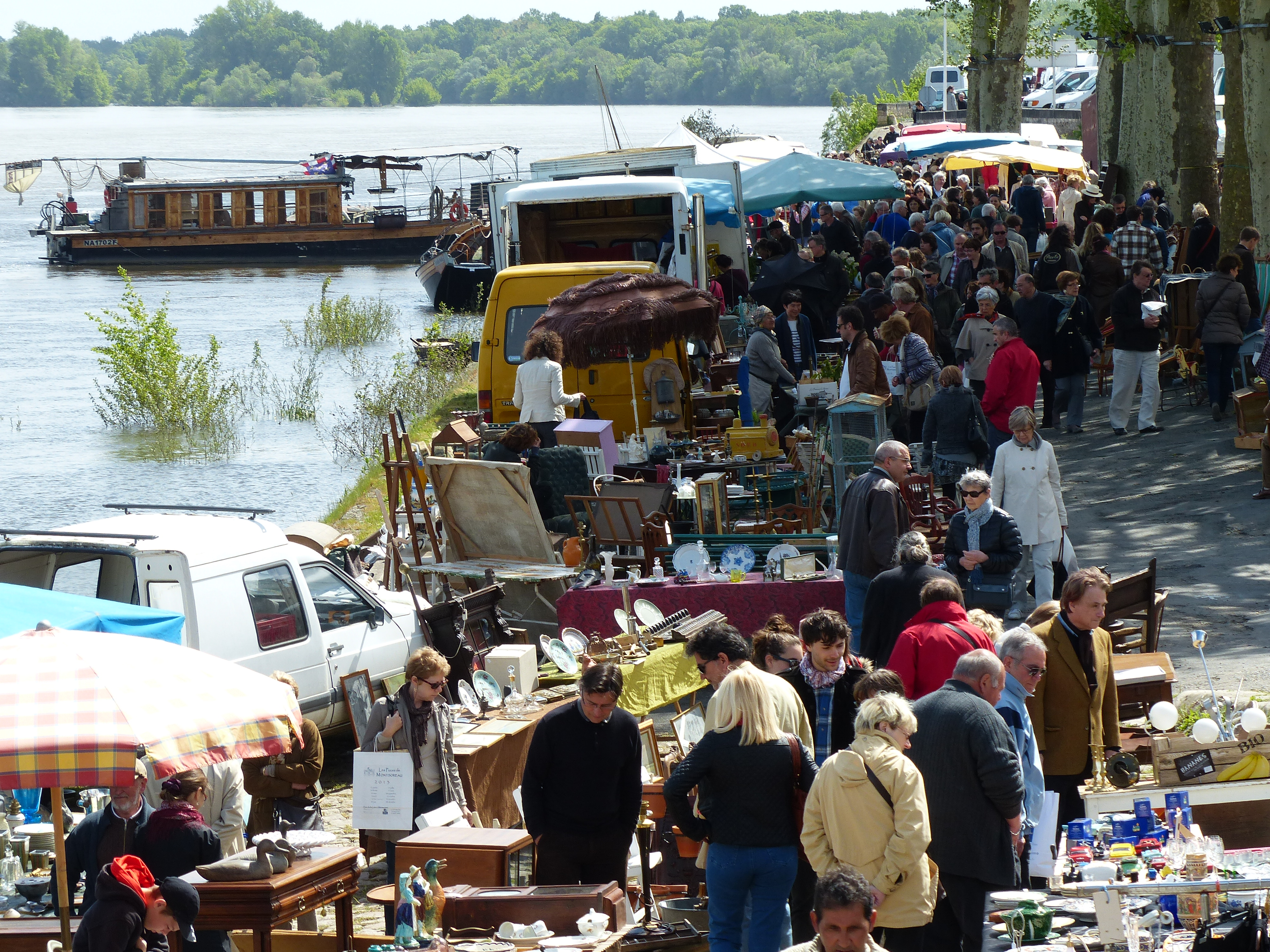
- Montsoreau Flea Market, Loire Valley.
- Status: Active
- Genre: Flea Market
- Dates: Every second sundays
- Frequency: Monthly
- Locations: Montsoreau, Maine-et-Loire, France
- Coordinates: Market 47.21669°N 0.05833°E
- Country: Europe
- Years active: 36
- Inaugurated: April 8, 1990
- Founder: Montsoreau City Council
- Most recent: 2018
- Previous event: 2018
- Next event: 2018
- Participants: 100
- Attendance: 10000
- Area: 5 acres (2.0 ha)
- Website: Our Flea Markets and Garage Sales Montsoreau

The Montsoreau Flea Market is the largest flea market in the Loire Valley, taking place all year on the second Sunday of the month. Montsoreau is listed among the most beautiful villages of France, and both the village and the château are part of the UNESCO listed World Heritage Site of the Loire Valley. The Montsoreau Flea Market includes, all year, a hundred professional merchants and is located in the vieux port district, on the banks of the Loire river.

== History ==
Montsoreau is a listed UNESCO World Heritage Site located in the Loire Valley, and is also listed among the Most Beautiful Villages of France. The flea market of Montsoreau was created in April 1990 by the municipality of Montsoreau in order to develop the commerce and tourism of this small city, and to take full advantage of the city scenery. The city of Montsoreau relied on a local network of antique dealers to define the periodicity (once a month, the second Sunday), and the identity of the event.

== France-Europe Antiques Quality Label ==
The Montsoreau flea market has received in 2006 the France-Europe Antiques Quality Label, and is one of the 52 events labeled in Europe. This label is issued by the SNCAO-GA (National Trade Union of Antiquity, Modern and Contemporary Art Galleries) and deposited at the INPI (National Institute of Intellectual Property) ) and WIPO (World Intellectual Property Organization) in Geneva.

== Attendance ==
In 2011, attendance was between 6,000 and 10,000 visitors per event, to today regularly exceed 10,000 visitors.

== Le plus des puces ==
Twenty arts and crafts professionals gathered to offer their services during the Montsoreau flea market. These professionals are able to restore objects sold by antique dealers, but also to offer their creations or custom projects. They affect all areas dedicated to arts and crafts, and are specialized in restoration, interior design, or decoration.

== See also ==
- Châteaux of the Loire Valley
- Loire Valley (wine)
