= Castellum of Larçay =

Military fortification in France

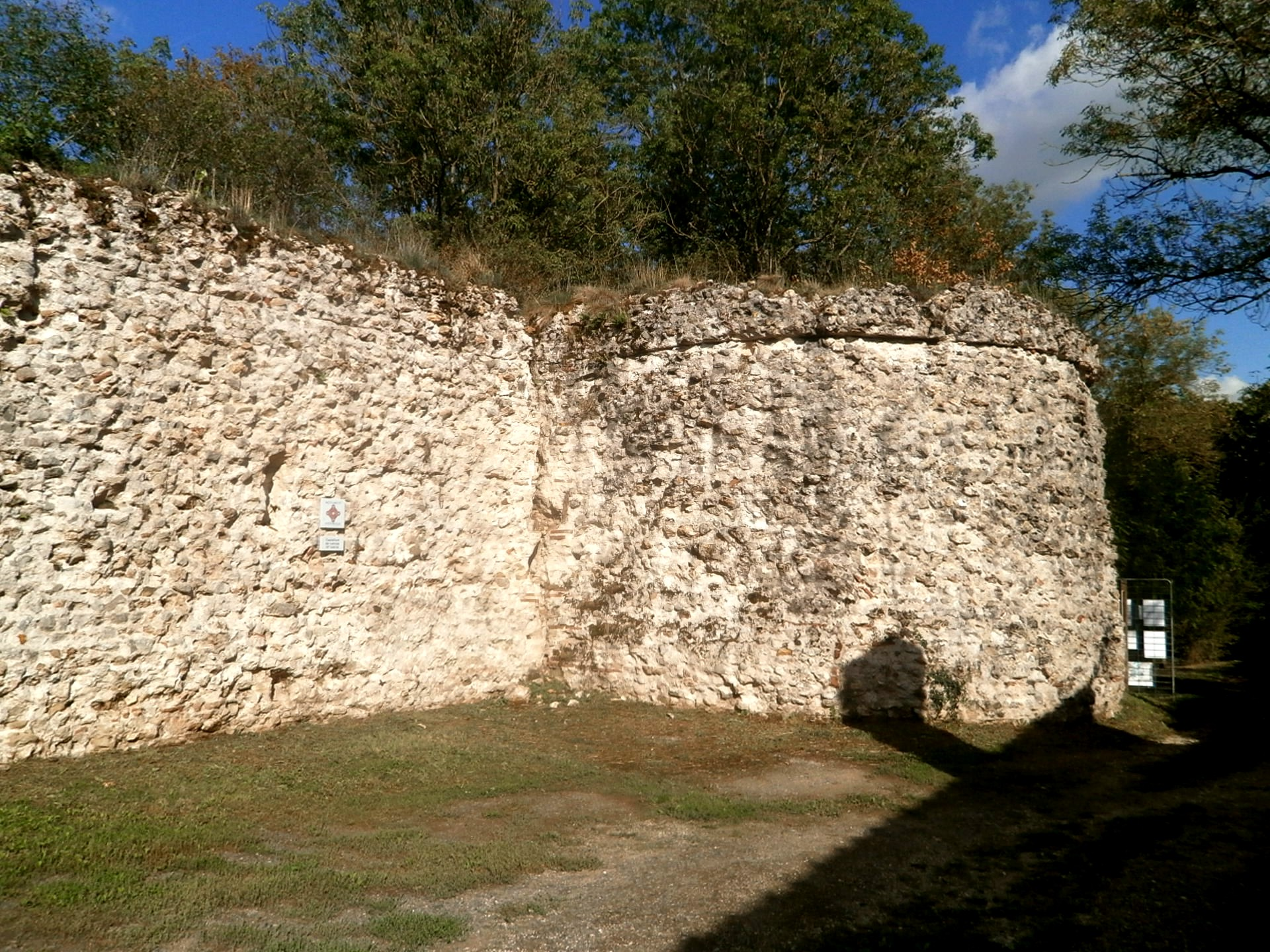
- Partial view of the south wall and the southeast corner tower.
- Interactive map of Castellum of Larçay
- Location: Larçay; Indre-et-Loire; France
- Coordinates: 47°22′03″N 0°46′35″E
- Type: Fortress
- Beginning date: 3rd century
- Heritage: Listed as a historic monument (1926)

The Castellum of Larçay is a Late Roman military fortification from the early period of the Late Roman Empire, located in the commune of Larçay, in the department of Indre-et-Loire (Centre-Val de Loire region), on a hillside overlooking the left bank of the Cher Valley.

Built a few kilometers southeast of Caesarodunum (modern Tours), the site probably dates to the second half of the 3rd century, in line with comparable constructions in Gaul. With a surface area of just over 3,000 m^{2}, it appears to have replaced an earlier commemorative monument of the mausoleum type on the same site, reusing some of its elements. The fortification was abandoned at the end of Antiquity. Several aspects remain uncertain, including whether construction was completed, the nature of its occupation, and its precise role within a broader defensive system of the civitas of the Turones. It likely functioned in the surveillance and control of movement along the ancient road between Avaricum (Bourges) and Caesarodunum (Tours), or one of its branches, as well as the river it overlooks.

Part of the curtain wall and several towers are still preserved. These remains were listed as historic monuments by decree on 12 June 1926.

== Geographical and historical context ==
The castellum in its ancient surroundings. (Note: In the absence of precise dating elements, particularly for the villa and the aqueduct, it is impossible to establish that the ancient structures mentioned on this undated plan are strictly contemporary.)

The castellum is situated on a hillside overlooking the left bank of the Cher valley, marked by a scarp approximately 30 meters high. The substrate consists of Cretaceous limestone, including Villedieu chalk and Touraine yellow tuffeau, covered by clayey colluvium and plateau loam. (Note: Wood 1984, pp. 791 & 803) In the modern landscape, the course of the Cher River lies about 250 meters north of the site.

In Antiquity, Larçay was located less than 10 km southeast of Caesarodunum (modern Tours), the capital of the Turones civitas. The site is situated near the main route from Bourges to Tours along the Cher Valley, which may have included multiple paths along the riverbanks and adjacent plateau. (Note: This section is only one element of the route which, from Lyon, capital of the Gauls during the High Empire, made it possible to reach the coasts of the Atlantic Ocean and Brittany (the tin route).) Several secondary roads also intersected the area within a few kilometers, including routes from Truyes to Saint-Martin-le-Beau, Truyes to Amboise, and possibly from Tours to Loches via Saint-Avertin. (Note: Boilleau 1865, p. 209) The Cher River was likely navigable during this period, facilitating the transport of goods and people.

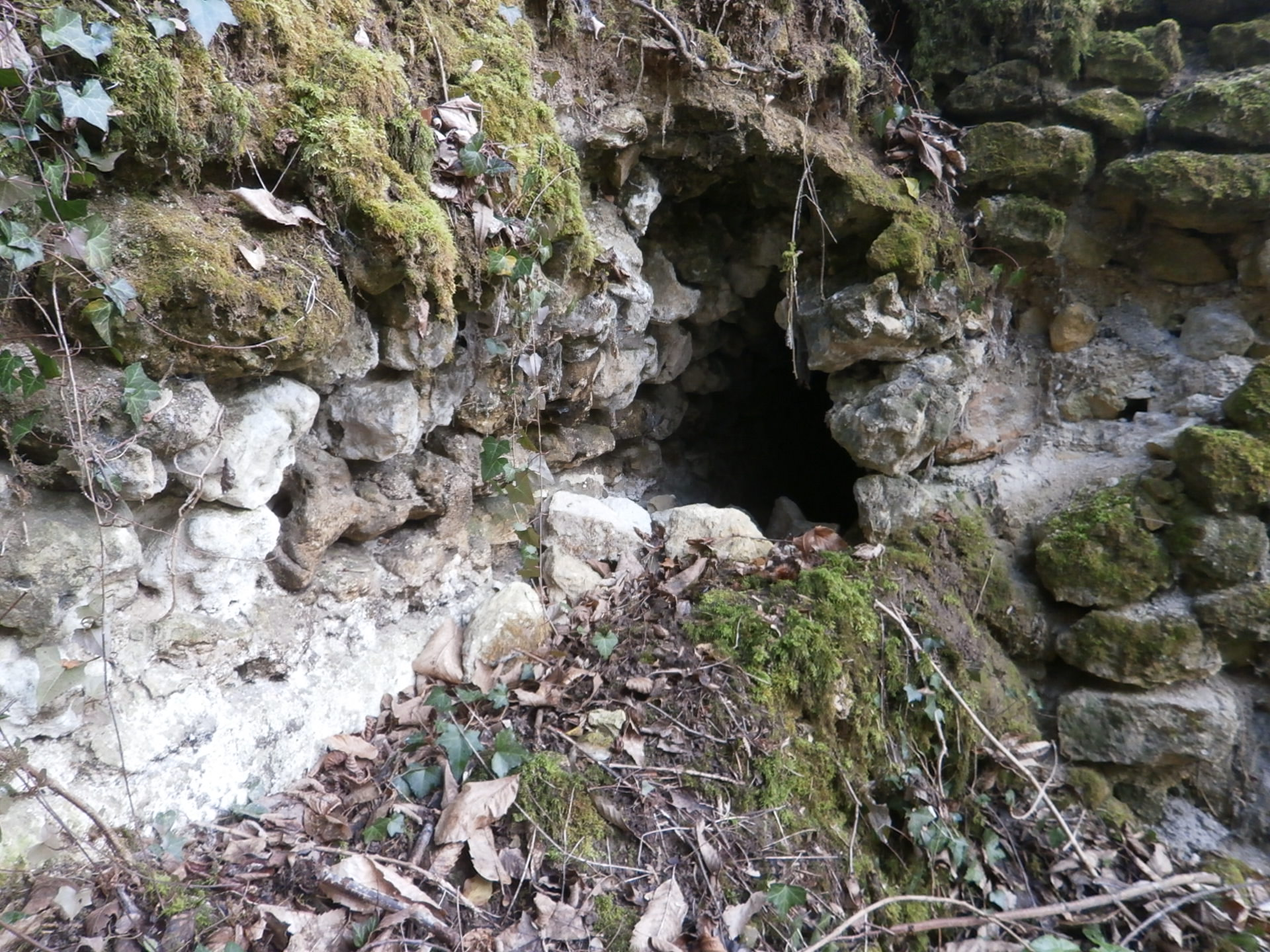
Remains of the Fontenay aqueduct at the foot of the Larçay hillside.

In the vicinity of the castellum, two other ancient structures have been identified. Approximately 40 meters to the southeast, a large complex measuring 140 × 120 m was constructed in the 1st and 2nd centuries AD, prior to the fort; initial excavations in the 1970s interpreted it as a villa, (Note: Audin 1977, p. 398) although this function has not been confirmed. An aqueduct, likely supplying Caesarodunum (modern Tours) in Antiquity, runs underground at the base of the hillside supporting the fort. Its construction date is uncertain but is generally associated with the development of the main public monuments of Tours, including baths, in the last quarter of the 1st century AD; (Note: Galinié 2007, pp. 325–326) the aqueduct was later abandoned. (Note: Galinié 2007, p. 336, « L'alimentation de la ville en eau par l'aqueduc du Cher ») The presence of a secondary settlement preceding or accompanying the castellum (Note: Galinié 2007, p. 350, « Entre ville et campagne, le réseau d'agglomérations secondaires de la cité des Turones ») has not been demonstrated.

The third-century crisis of the Roman Empire resulted in a decline in economic activity and disrupted administrative functions across the provinces. The civitas of the Turones faced security challenges due to increased barbarian incursions, which, from around 250 AD, extended into the northern provinces of Gaul from the Germanic limes. The construction of the Castellum of Larçay at this specific location and period appears to have been intended to control river and land traffic in the vicinity of Caesarodunum (Tours) during this potentially unstable period. The fort's garrison would also have been able to use the surrounding road network to move quickly and respond to threats, providing both surveillance and a degree of defensive coverage for the region.

== History ==
=== Chronology of the site ===
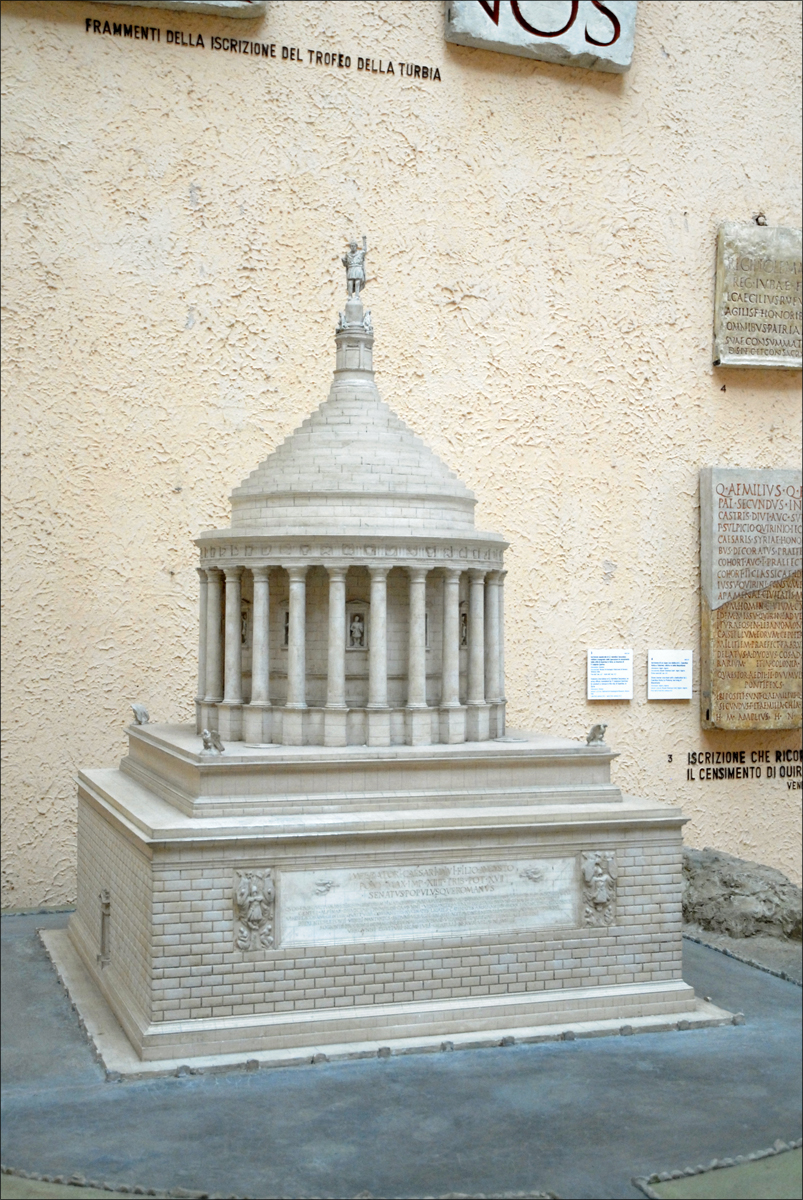
Model of the Trophy of the Alps from La Turbie (Museum of Roman Civilization, Rome).

The pre-Antiquity history of the site is not documented, although a protohistoric occupation has been identified approximately 200 meters to the southwest.

Excavations conducted between 1984 and 1987 revealed a large building predating the castellum, situated along its southern wall. The structure consists of a square podium supporting the beginnings of a circular building (rotunda) constructed with blocks of tuffeau and hard limestone joined with white mortar. The excavator estimated the rotunda's diameter at approximately fifteen meters. The complex, which appears to have been surrounded by a colonnade, has been interpreted as a monumental mausoleum comparable to the one at La Turbie. Its elevated location would have made it visible from the Cher Valley. A second building of undetermined function, located in the western part of the fort, appears to be contemporaneous with the mausoleum. Limited archaeological evidence suggests that the ensemble was constructed in the 1st or 2nd century AD.

In a subsequent phase, the mausoleum was deliberately dismantled during the construction of the castellum, with some of its elements, including fluted and smooth columns, reused in the foundations and lower courses of the fort. This reuse of materials was noted by Louis Boilleau in 1865, although the origin of the elements was not identified at that time. (Note: Boilleau 1865, p. 199) The demolition may have been partial, with a portion of the rotunda incorporated into the southern wall of the fort, in a manner comparable to the reuse of the amphitheater in the enclosure of Tours. (Note: Built in the first half of the fourth century, the enclosure of Tours is organized around the amphitheater, which forms a prominent bastion in the middle of its southern façade. (Note: Galinié 2007, pp. 359–361, « La fortification de la ville au IVe siècle : un nouveau plan d'urbanisme »)) In this scenario, the entrance to the fort may have been situated to the east of this bastion.

The construction of the castellum can be dated to the second half of the 3rd century, possibly between 256 and 270, in line with other late-antique forts built in Gaul during the same period. (Note: Audin 1977, p. 383) Its construction appears to have proceeded in a regular and organized manner, either before the onset of a period of instability or between two episodes of insecurity. (Note: Audin 1977, p. 386) (Note: It appears that around the same period the amphitheater of Tours was transformed into a fortress, before a complete enclosure was constructed.) It has been suggested that this construction may have been part of a broader program to establish regional military defenses, which included the fortification of the city of Tours as well as the construction of additional forts along the Cher, such as the one at Chisseaux farther east on the right bank of the river. The positioning and function of these forts indicate an objective to control and secure important communication routes, both terrestrial and riverine, during a period of heightened security concerns in the region. (Note: Galinié 2007, p. 348, « Les environs de Caesarodunum et ceux de la Cité »)

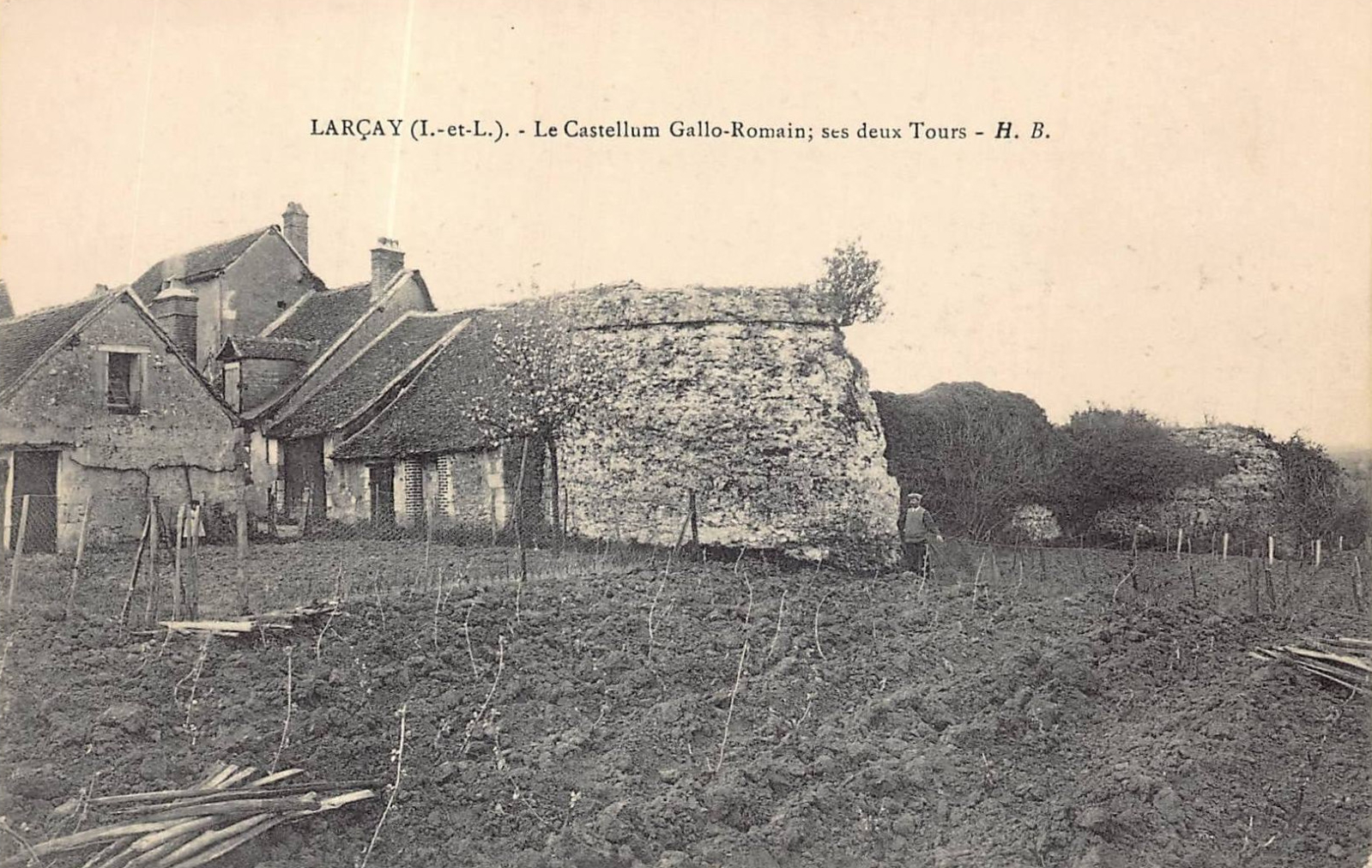
The castellum at the beginning of the 20th century.

The castellum was never fully completed and was abandoned by the end of Antiquity. (Note: Audin 1977, p. 385) In the 19th century, Louis Boilleau attributed its destruction to raids by the Bagaudae, (Note: Boilleau 1865, p. 208) a thesis that was widely cited at the time to explain the ruin of Roman buildings in Gaul.

During the early Middle Ages, the interior of the castellum appears to have been reoccupied, although its functions had changed. Materials from the original structure were reused, and burials were installed, including a Merovingian sarcophagus and an in-ground grave. Archaeological evidence also includes sherds of 15th-century pottery and possible palisades from the same period. Modern colluvial deposits cover these layers, complicating their study.

In the 1970s, the fortified perimeter was subdivided and converted into gardens. This activity significantly disturbed the soil, complicating excavations and the interpretation of archaeological results. Buildings had also long been constructed against the western and southern sections of the curtain wall, further affecting preservation. (Note: Wood 1984, p. 791)

=== Bibliographic mentions, excavations, and studies ===
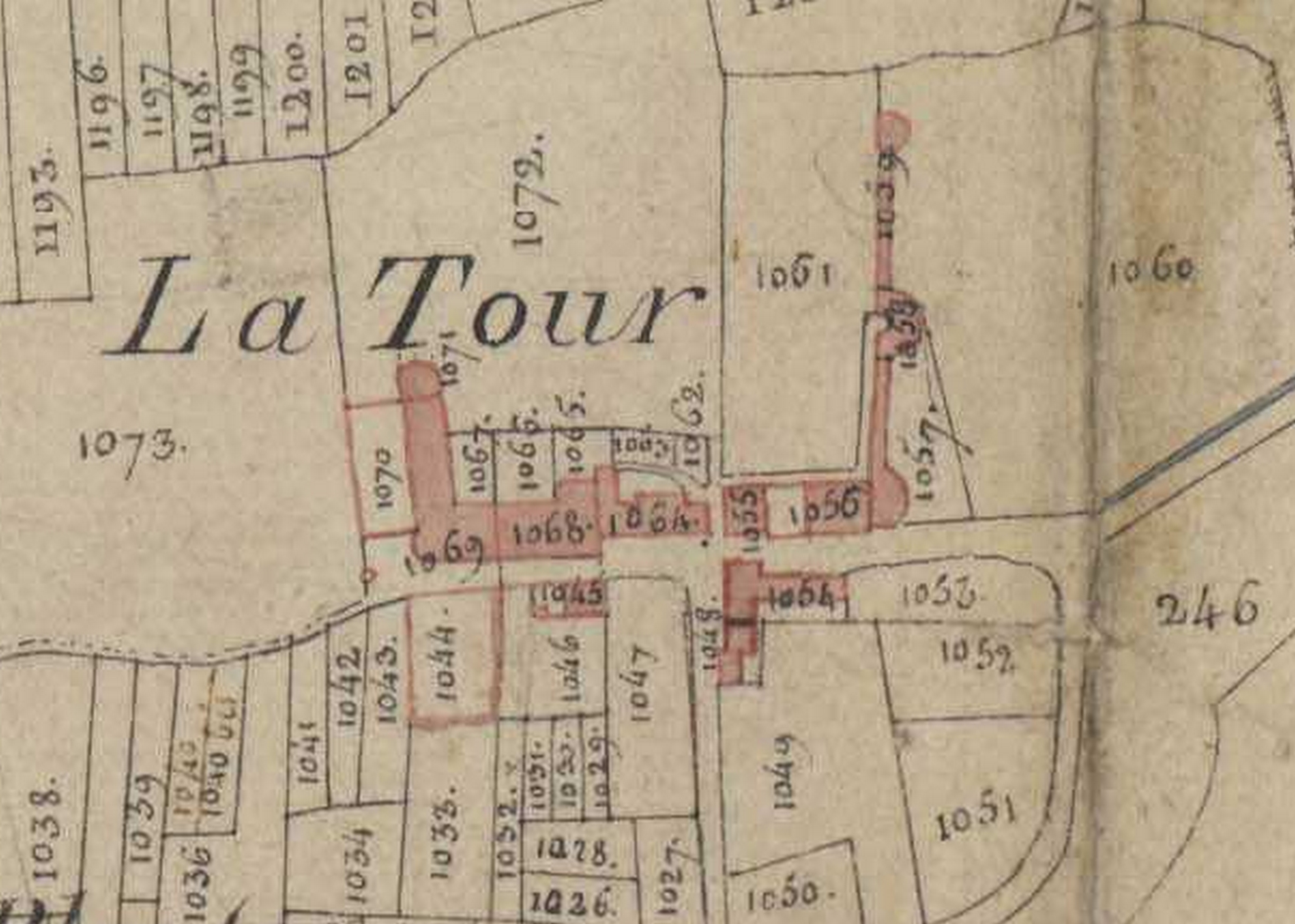
Cadastral map from 1808.

The structure was first depicted on Carte du Duché de Choiseül Amboise et ses environs, covering Amboise and its surroundings, where it appears as a rectangle under the toponym “la Tour.” A plan from the Napoleonic cadastre of 1808 also shows some of its remains under the same name, with a corresponding parcel layout. (Note: Wood 1984, p. 794)

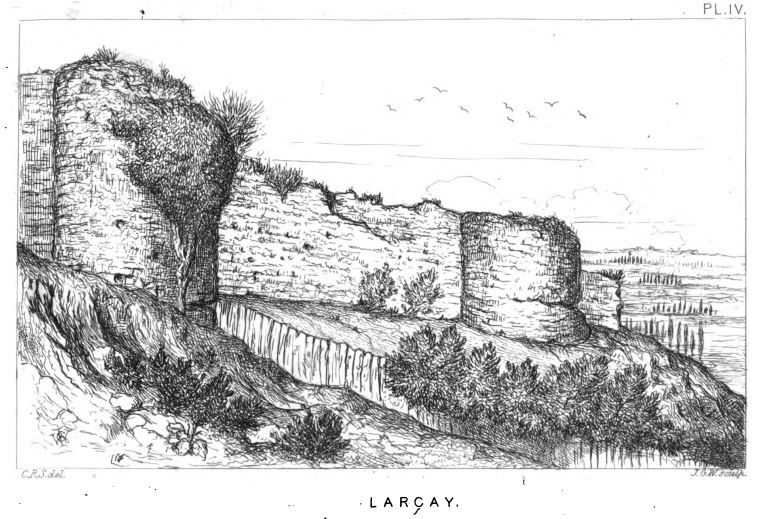
Eastern side of the castellum by Charles Roach Smith in 1855.

The ruins of the fortin, while visible, do not appear to have been formally documented before the mid-19th century. In 1853, Louis Boilleau and Jean-Jacques Bourassé, both members of the Archaeological Society of Touraine, carried out studies of the site and recorded its characteristics. Shortly thereafter, Arcisse de Caumont and Charles Roach Smith visited the fortin and reported their observations. Smith mentioned Larçay in his travel account Notes on Some of the Antiquities of France, based on a fortnight’s excursion in the summer of 1854, and also included references to the site in the fourth volume of Collectanea Antiqua: Etchings and Notices of Ancient Remains, Illustrative of the Habits, Customs and History of Past Ages, a collection documenting ancient monuments and sites in France. In 1858, Charles Mourain de Sourdeval, acting as a member of a commission appointed by the Archaeological Society of Touraine to examine the fortification, suggested that the structure could have served as the residence of a praetor or as a final refuge in the event of an invasion.

The castellum was listed as a historic monument by decree on 12 June 1926. Prior to the Second World War, Henry Auvray initiated clearance of the site, but the work was interrupted by the conflict before any systematic observations could be completed. (Note: Wood 1984, p. 792) In the early 1970s, the historian Pierre Audin conducted excavations on the fortin and its immediate surroundings, publishing the results in an article synthesizing existing knowledge on the ancient history of Larçay.

Between 1984 and 1987, the British archaeologist Jason Wood carried out extensive excavations, accompanied by soil resistivity surveys. (Note: Wood 1984, p. 802) Interim reports of these investigations were published in several issues of the Bulletin de la Société archéologique de Touraine (1984, 1986, and 1989). Since that period, no dedicated studies of the castellum have been reported.

== Description of the castellum ==
=== General plan ===
Schematic plan of the castellum. Remains from the early empire Remains from the late empire confirmed Remains from the late empire uncertain

The structure has an irregular trapezoidal plan, (Note: The earliest authors, including Louis Boilleau, who provided the first description in 1853, described the castellum as a rectangular enclosure, although cadastral plans contradict this assessment. It was not until the work and publications of the 1970s that the trapezoidal shape of the fortin was recognized.) with internal dimensions of approximately 66 × 50 m, resulting in an internal surface area of about 3,150 m^{2}, which is modest compared with other castella in Gaul. The wider base, measuring 66 m, faces north toward the Cher Valley, positioned above the slope, while the narrower base, measuring 60 m, is oriented to the south. The main access to the interior is through a gate in the southern wall. Jason Wood proposed, with caution, the presence of a secondary, narrower gate in the western curtain wall, flanked by an intermediate tower. Circular or U-shaped towers reinforce the curtain wall at intervals.

Only the southern and eastern sides of the fortin can be fully reconstructed; the western face is preserved along approximately half of its length, and the elevation of the northern wall has not been identified. It has been suggested that the original plan may not have been fully executed, with the northwestern corner potentially replaced by an oblique wall, as no masonry is present at the presumed location of the corner tower or along the connecting sections of the curtain walls. The internal layout of the fortin during its ancient phase remains unknown, as later occupations extensively disturbed the interior. Given its limited dimensions, the structure was unlikely to accommodate a large garrison.

Despite these uncertainties, the castellum of Larçay is considered one of the best-preserved examples of its type in France.

=== Architecture ===
==== Foundations ====
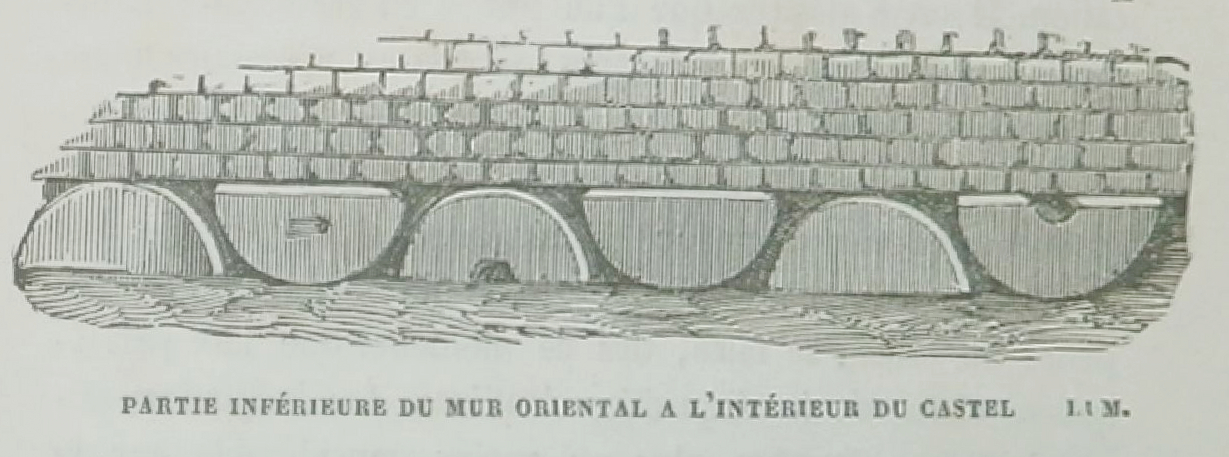
Foundations of the castellum designed by Arcisse de Caumont.

Over much of its perimeter, the castellum appears to lack continuous masonry foundations set in trenches, with the curtain wall instead supported by rudimentary structural arrangements. The foundations of the southwestern tower, which were examined, are of a similar type, and this may have applied to the other towers as well. (Note: Audin 1977, p. 382)

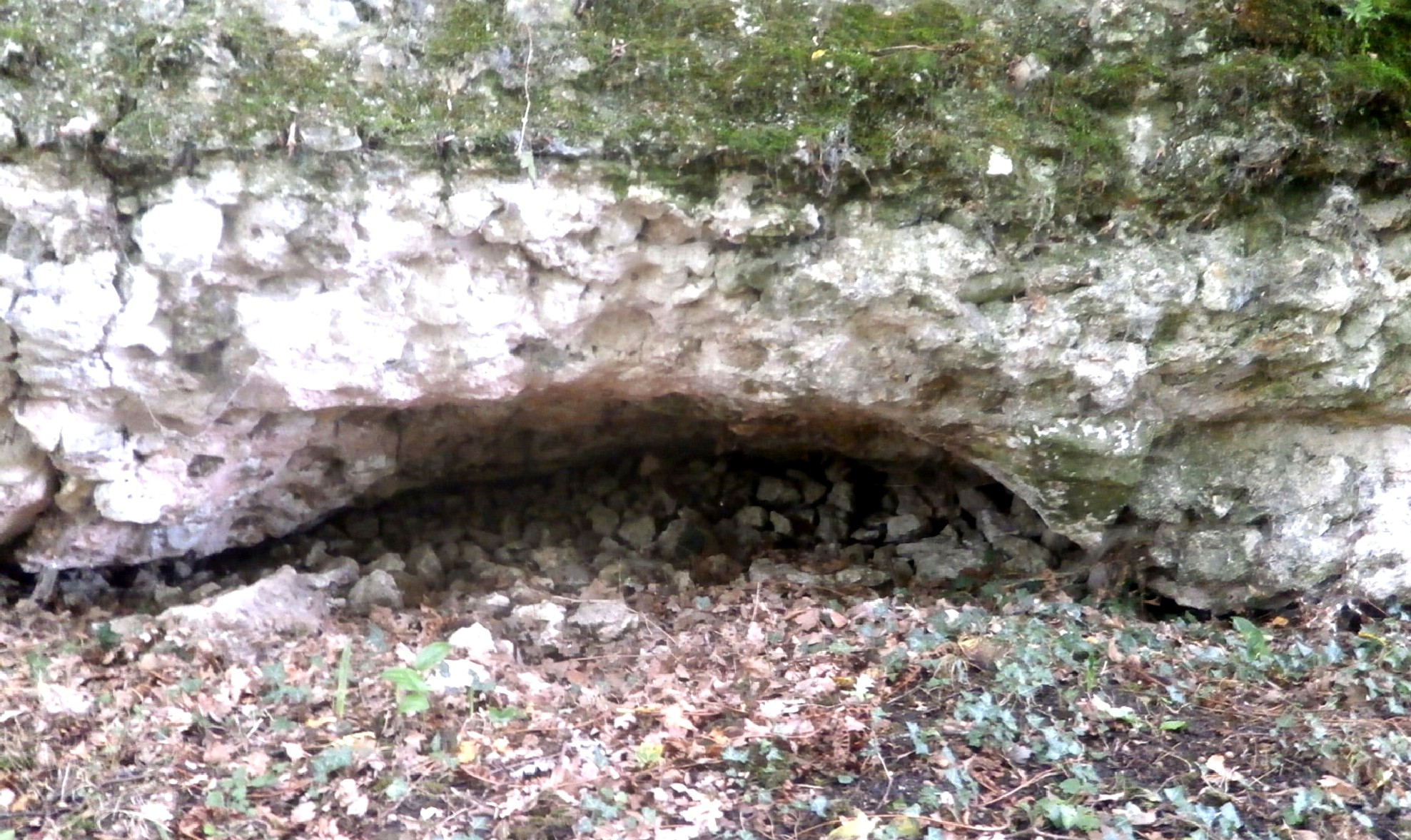
Dry stone foundations of the eastern enclosure wall.

In certain areas, reused elements were incorporated on a layer of compacted clay. These include sections of smooth or fluted column shafts of varying diameters, sawn lengthwise and arranged side by side with tight joints, with their flat faces alternately facing upward and downward. (Note: Wood 1989, p. 813) Sculpted blocks were also reused. Some of these elements, recovered from the ground during the excavation of cellars beneath the wall, were stored in the nineteenth century inside dwellings constructed against the curtain wall. Many of these components likely originated from the dismantling of the original mausoleum.

In other areas, courses of dry stone were used to level the ground before construction of the wall elevations. Due to the natural slope of the terrain from south to north, the foundation beds were arranged in stepped layers to create a horizontal surface supporting the walls. On these rudimentary foundations, blocks of tuffeau, millstone, or hard limestone—slightly wider than the curtain wall and approximately 0.10 m thick—were laid as a leveling course to ensure the horizontality of the masonry beds. (Note: Wood 1984, p. 805)

==== Curtain wall ====
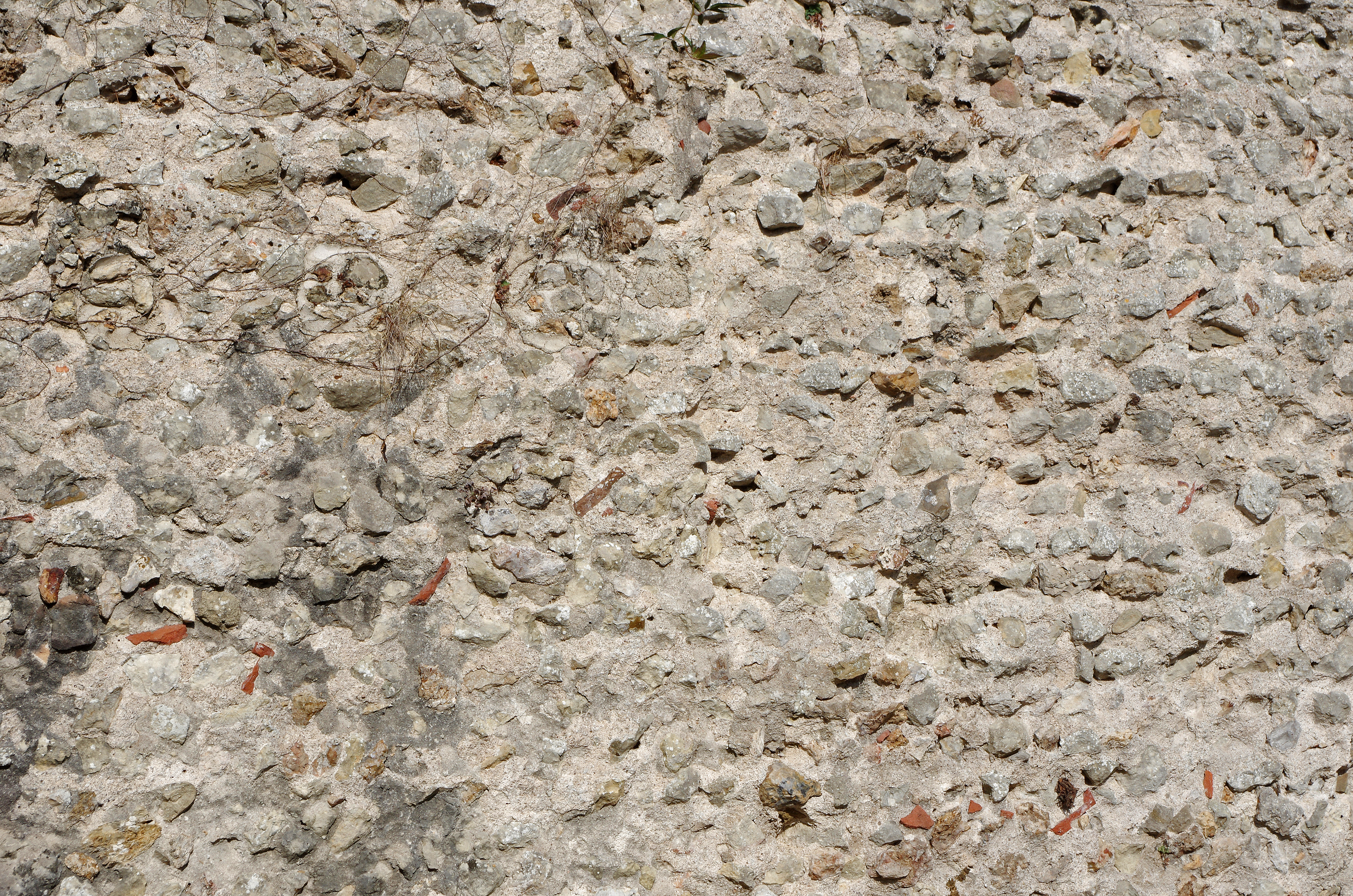
Southern curtain wall without its facing.

The curtain wall measures 4.20 m in thickness on the south side, 3.50 m on the lateral sides, and 2.20 m on the north side, possibly reflecting the natural defensive advantage provided by the escarpment on that side. In some areas, the wall is preserved to a height of approximately 6 m, although its original height remains unknown. The northern wall, except for its eastern extremity, was never built in elevation, and its exposed foundations were gradually covered by natural sediment accumulation.

The structure of the curtain wall consists of two facing walls of small limestone rubble masonry, with courses of architectural terracotta (tiles rather than bricks) interspersed, enclosing a core of coarse rubble composed of limestone of varying hardness, siliceous stones, and fragments of terracotta, all bonded with lime mortar. The facing is preserved in its original state only in limited sections of the curtain wall, particularly on the inner face of the castellum and at the base of the walls in the first few centimeters above ground level. In other areas, the facing has largely been reworked or lost, exposing the masonry core.

==== Towers ====
The corners of the castellum, with the exception of the north-western corner, are reinforced by towers shaped as three-quarters of a circle. The north-eastern corner tower has a diameter of 6.60 m. (Note: Audin 1977, p. 390) A smaller, U-shaped tower is located on the southern side, possibly at the level of the gate. Intermediate towers on the eastern and western sides are also U-shaped. These towers, like the corner towers, are simply abutted against the curtain wall without bonded masonry, and may have been constructed at a later stage. Cracks at the junctions, noted since the nineteenth century, indicate the absence of bonding between the towers and the curtain wall.

The towers were originally faced with small rubble masonry and incorporated courses of tiles, similar to the curtain wall; this facing is now largely lost. The towers are solid, and the height of the best-preserved examples corresponds to that of the curtain wall.

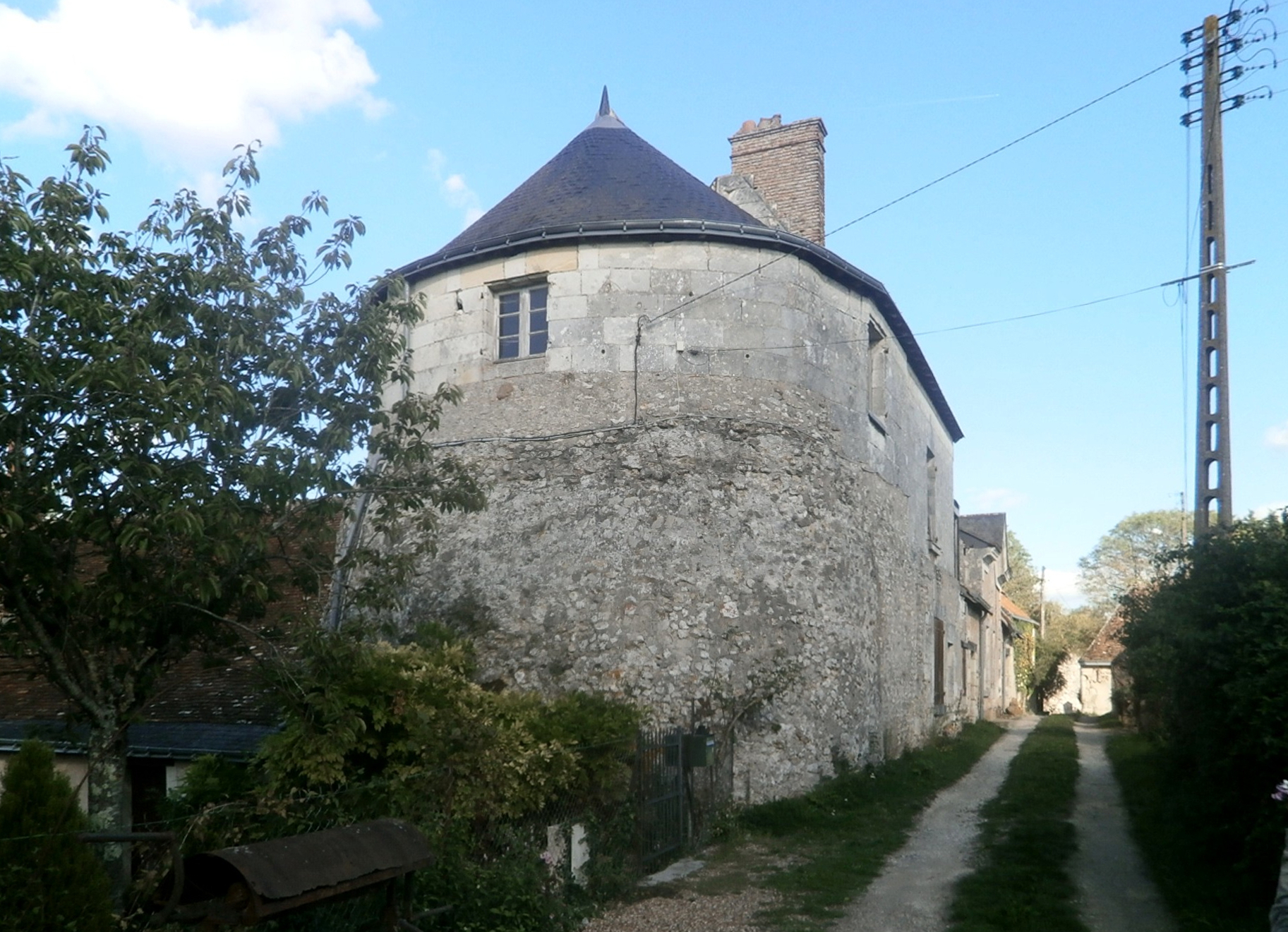
Southwest corner tower, topped by a dwelling. (Note: According to Louis Boilleau, this addition was made in the early years of the nineteenth century. (Note: Boilleau 1865, p. 202))

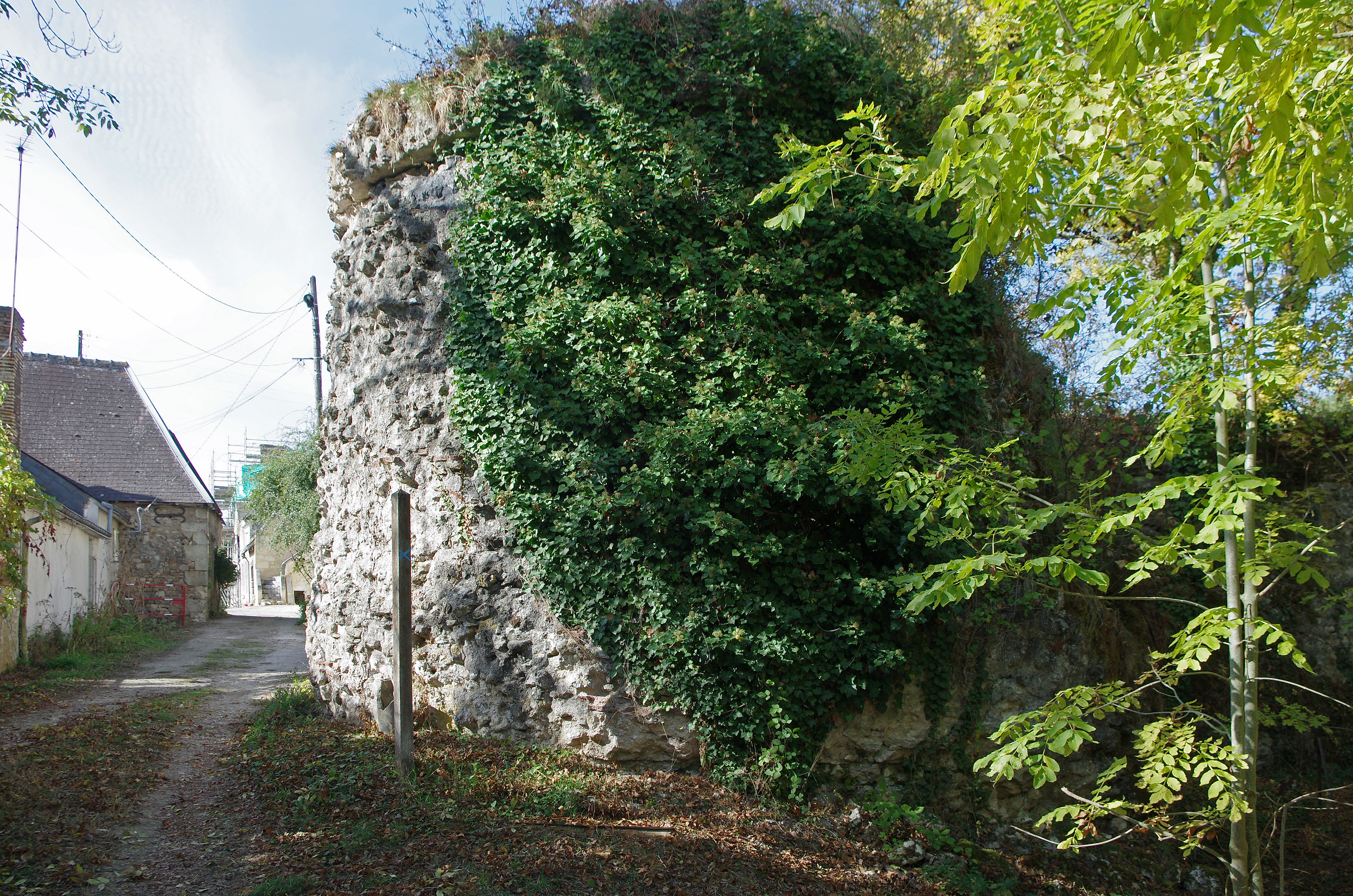
Southeast corner tower.

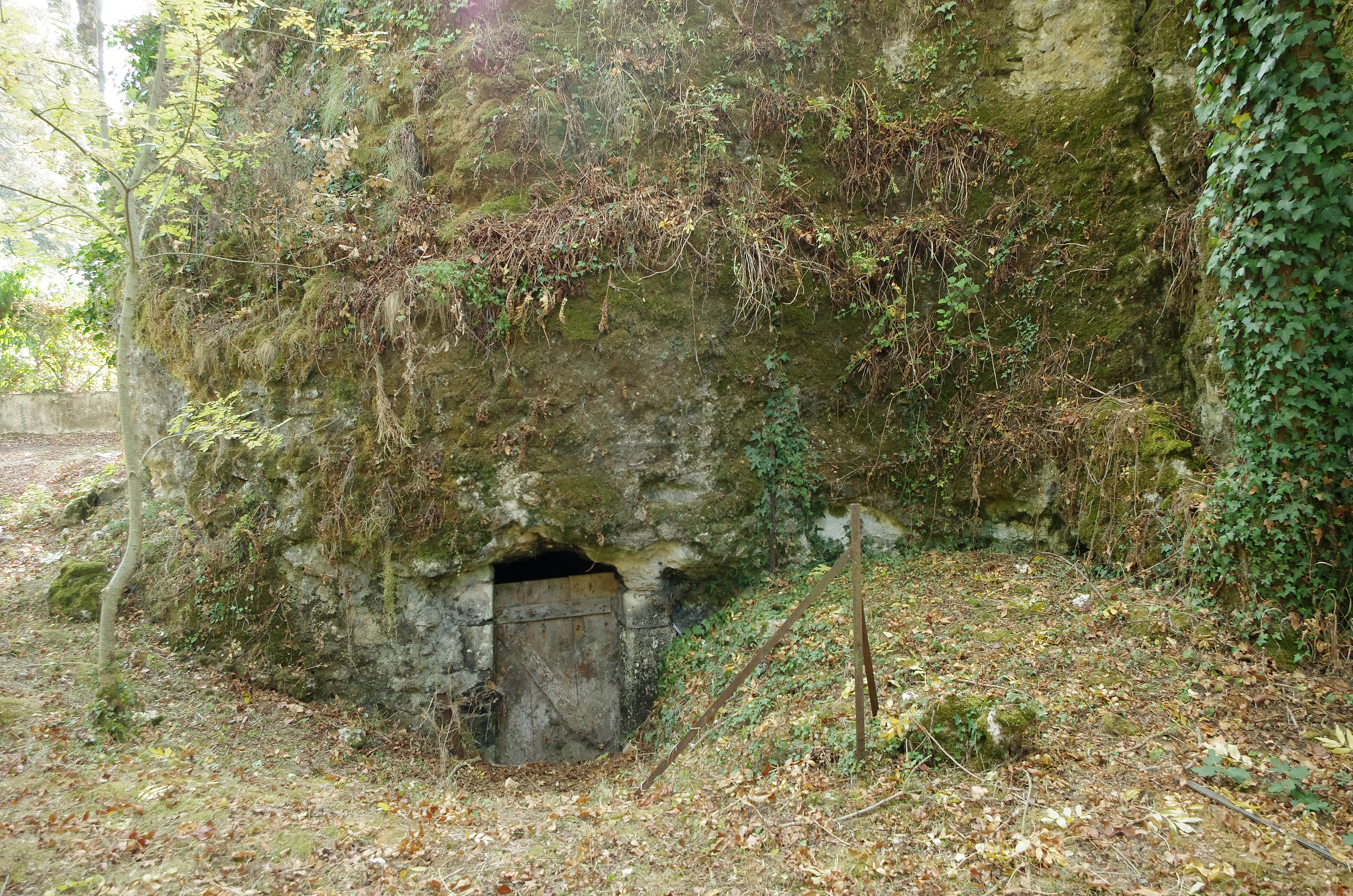
Cellar dug under the southeast corner tower.

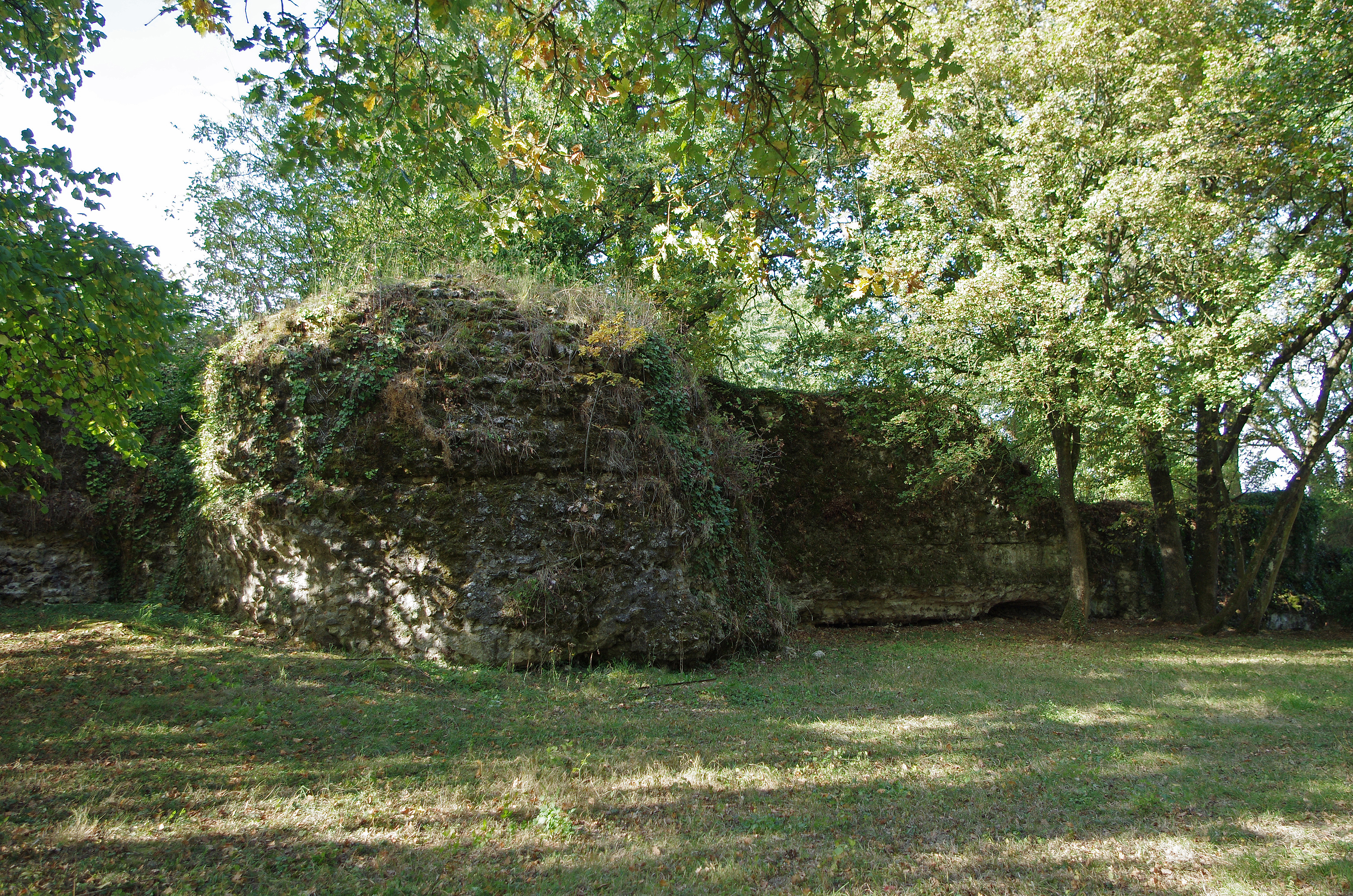
Intermediate tower on the east side.

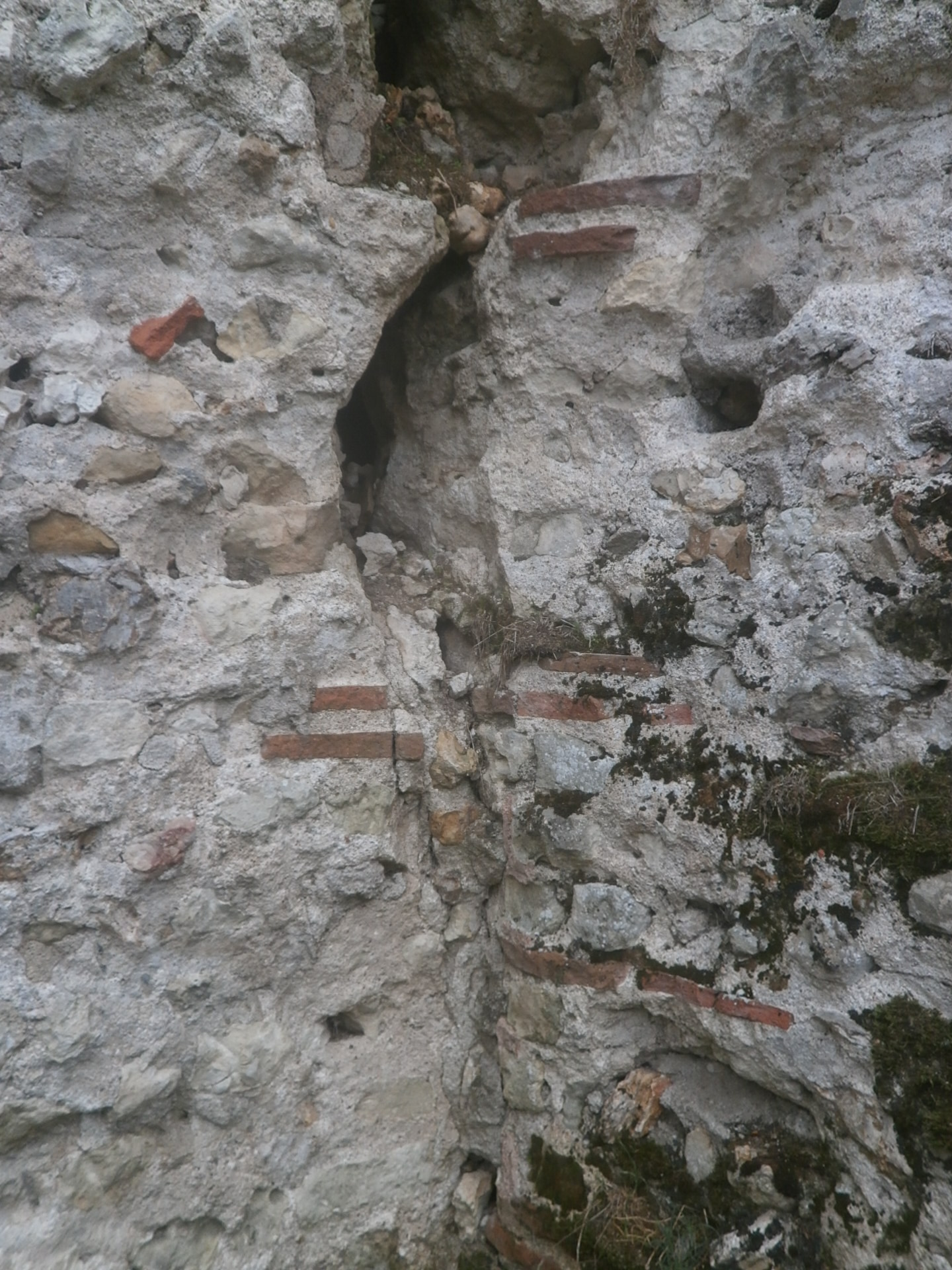
Connection between the south wall on the left and the corner tower on the right.

=== Archaeological finds ===
The archaeological material recovered within the enclosure of the castellum and its immediate surroundings is limited. Reported finds include approximately twenty coins from the reigns of Vespasian, Constantine, and Faustina the Younger, as well as coins dating to the late third century, although their exact locations within the site are not documented. Red-glazed wares and terra sigillata pottery from the site are held by the Archaeological Society of Touraine. Information on the date of discovery, precise typology, and original context of these objects is not available.

== See also ==
- Larçay
- Castellum
- Low Roman Empire

== Bibliography ==
- Audin, Pierre (1977). "Larçay gallo-romain" [Gallo-Roman Larçay]. Bulletin de la Société archéologique de Touraine (in French). XXXVIII: 379–398.
- Boilleau, Louis (1865). "Castellum de Larçay" [Castellum of Larçay]. Mémoire de la Société archéologique de Touraine (in French). XVII: 197–211.
- Cleary, Simon Esmonde; Wood, Jason. "Charles Roach Smith and late Roman defences in western France: Franco-British cooperation in the mid nineteenth century". De Rome à Lugdunum des Convenes: hommages à Robert Sablayrolles [From Rome to Lugdunum des Convenes: tributes to Robert Sablayrolles]. fédération Aquitania. pp. 217–230. ISBN 978-2-3561-3085-3.
- de Caumont, Arcisse (1856). "Le castellum gallo-romain de Larçay près de Tours" [The Gallo-Roman castellum of Larçay near Tours]. Bulletin monumental (in French): 308–320.
- Croubois, Claude (1986). L'Indre-et-Loire – La Touraine, des origines à nos jours [Indre-et-Loire – Touraine, from its origins to the present day]. L'histoire par les documents (in French). Saint-Jean-d’Angely: Bordessoules. ISBN 2-9035-0409-1.
- Galinié, Henri (2007). Tours antique et médiéval. Lieux de vie, temps de la ville. 40 ans d'archéologie urbaine, 30e supplément à la Revue archéologique du Centre de la France (RACF), numéro spécial de la collection Recherches sur Tours [Ancient and medieval Tours. Places of life, times of the city. 40 years of urban archaeology, 30th supplement to the Revue archéologique du Centre de la France (RACF), special issue of the Recherches sur Tours collection] (in French). Tours: FERACF. ISBN 978-29132-7215-6.
- Provost, Michel (1988). L'Indre-et-Loire [Indre-et-Loire]. Carte archéologique de la Gaule (in French). Paris: Éditions de la Maison des sciences de l'homme. ISBN 978-2-8775-4002-5.
- Wood, Jason (1984). "Études archéologiques à Larçay 1984. Rapport préliminaire" [Archaeological studies in Larçay 1984. Preliminary report]. Bulletin de la Société archéologique de Touraine (in French). XL: 789–815.
- Wood, Jason (1989). "Études archéologiques à Larçay 1986-1987. Rapport préliminaire" [Archaeological studies in Larçay 1986-1987. Preliminary report]. Bulletin de la Société archéologique de Touraine (in French). XLII: 53–75.
