= Larçay =

- Commune
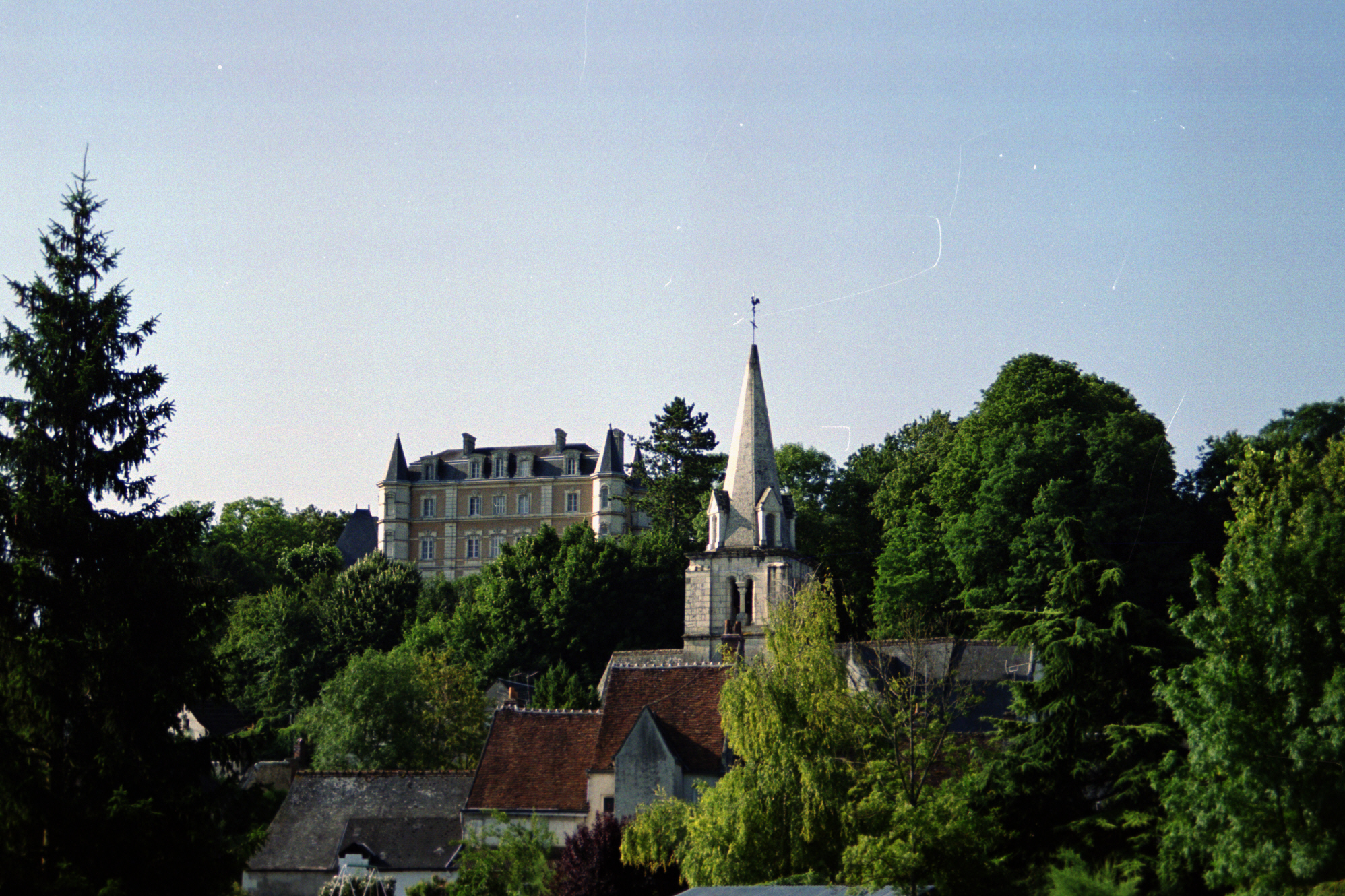
- The church tower and the manor house, in Larçay

- Coat of arms
- Location of Larçay
- Location within France Location within Centre-Val de Loire
- Coordinates: 47°22′07″N 0°46′51″E
- Country: France
- Region: Centre-Val de Loire
- Department: Indre-et-Loire
- Arrondissement: Tours
- Canton: Montlouis-sur-Loire

Government
  - Mayor (2020–2026): Jean-François Cessac
- Area^{1}: 11.19 km^{2} (4.32 sq mi)
- Highest elevation: 95 m (312 ft)
- Lowest elevation: 46 m (151 ft)
- Population (2023): 2,657
  - Density: 237.4/km^{2} (615.0/sq mi)
- Time zone: UTC+01:00 (CET)
  - Summer (DST): UTC+02:00 (CEST)
- INSEE/Postal code: 37124 /37270
- ^{1} French Land Register data, which excludes lakes, ponds, glaciers > 1 km^{2} (0.386 sq mi or 247 acres) and river estuaries.

Larçay (French pronunciation: [laʁsɛ]) is a commune in the Indre-et-Loire department in central France.

== Population ==
The inhabitants are called Larcéens in French.

Historical population

Year	Pop.	±% p.a.
1793	460	—
1800	304	−5.75%
1806	441	+6.40%
1821	420	−0.32%
1831	470	+1.13%
1836	450	−0.87%
1841	445	−0.22%
1846	441	−0.18%
1851	440	−0.05%
1856	467	+1.20%
1861	482	+0.63%
1866	494	+0.49%
1872	473	−0.72%
1876	480	+0.37%
1881	515	+1.42%
1886	510	−0.19%
1891	521	+0.43%
1896	517	−0.15%
1901	486	−1.23%

Year	Pop.	±% p.a.
1906	522	+1.44%
1911	490	−1.26%
1921	510	+0.40%
1926	504	−0.24%
1931	468	−1.47%
1936	461	−0.30%
1946	505	+0.92%
1954	587	+1.90%
1962	678	+1.82%
1968	759	+1.90%
1975	938	+3.07%
1982	1,412	+6.02%
1990	1,751	+2.73%
1999	2,037	+1.70%
2007	2,285	+1.45%
2012	2,417	+1.13%
2017	2,462	+0.37%
2023	2,657	+1.28%

Source: EHESS and INSEE (1968-2023)

== See also ==
- Communes of the Indre-et-Loire department
- Castellum of Larçay
