= David Bainbridge (artist) =

British artist

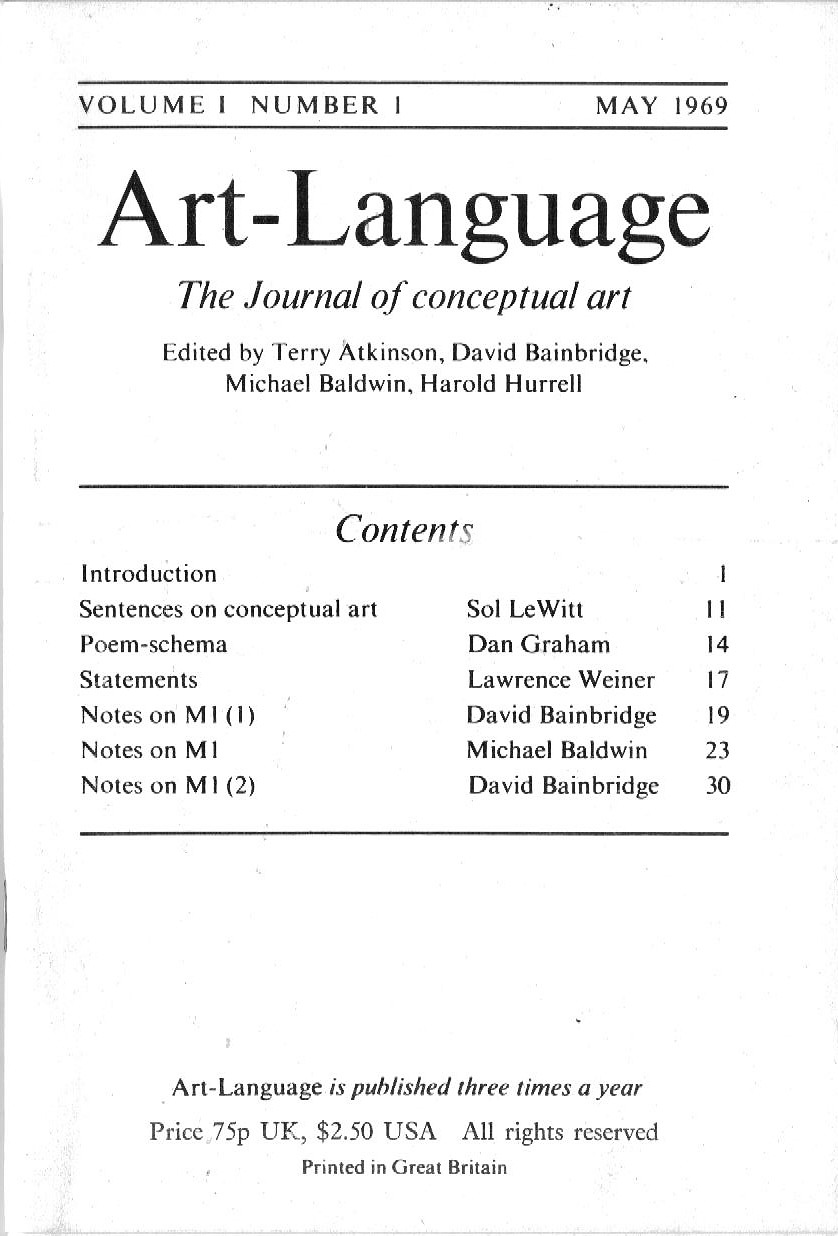
Cover of Art-Language 1.1 the journal of conceptual art by Art & Language edited, and with an article by, David Bainbridge

David Bainbridge (* 1941 in Barnsley, Yorkshire, Great Britain; † 30 June 2013) was a British sculptor, Conceptual Artist and member of the artist group Art & Language.

== Life and work ==
David Bainbridge studied at the St. Martin's School of Art in London from 1963 to 1966. He taught at Birmingham College of Art from 1966 to 1969 and at Lanchester Polytechnic in Coventry from 1969 to 1971 and on Hull College of Art + Stourbridge College of Art from 1971 until retirement.

Bainbridge worked with the "Fine-Artz-Group" on "" Action Chair "" in 1964. He participated in the Sculpture Exhibition at St. Martins School of Art in London in 1966. In 1969 he had an exhibition at the Seattle Art Museum.

David Bainbridge became a member of the Art & Language artist group in 1969 and remained so until the mid-1970s. He was an editor of their journal Art-Language

As a member of Art & Language, David Bainbridge participated in the Documenta 5 in Kassel in 1972 with the project ´ "Index 0001" in the department "Idea + Idea / Light", together with the Art & Language Artists Terry Atkinson, Michael Baldwin, Ian Burn, Charles Harrison, Harold Hurrell, Mel Ramsden and the American specialist in art-language Joseph Kosuth. He was also represented at Documenta 6 in 1977 with Art & Language.

== Literature and sources ==
- Exhibition catalog: documenta 5th survey of reality - visual worlds today ; Catalog (as a file folder) Volume 1: (Material); Volume 2: (list of exhibits); Kassel 1972
- documenta archive (ed.); Resubmission d5 – A survey of the archive on documenta 1972 ; Kassel / Ostfildern 2001, ISBN 3-7757-1121-X
- Catalog for documenta 6: Volume 1: Painting, sculpture / environment, performance; Volume 2: photography, film, video; Volume 3: Hand drawings, utopian design, books; Kassel 1977 ISBN 3-920453-00-X
- Marzona, Daniel: Conceptual Art; Cologne 2005 ISBN 3-8228-2959-5
