= Terry Smith (art historian) =

Australian art historian, art critic, and artist

Terence Edwin "Terry" Smith (born 1944) is an Australian art historian, art critic, and artist who has lived and worked in Sydney, New York City, and Pittsburgh. Since 2001 and as of 2025 he is Andrew W. Mellon Professor of Contemporary Art History and Theory at the University of Pittsburgh, and for the academic year 2025-6 is Slade Professor of Fine Art at Cambridge University.

== Early life and education ==
Terence Edwin Smith was born in 1944.

He was a student at Melbourne High School, where he matriculated in 1962, earning a General Exhibition (academic award). He edited the school magazine, The Unicorn, and was in the football and basketball teams and athletics teams.

Between 1963 and 1967, he studied at the University of Melbourne, where he studied art history under Sir Joseph Burke, Franz Philipp, and Bernard Smith. When the Power Institute of Fine Arts was established at the University of Sydney in 1968, he tutored to professors Bernard Smith, David Saunders, and Donald Brook.

Winning a Harkness Fellowship in 1972, he studied at the Institute of Fine Arts, New York City, and at Columbia University under Meyer Schapiro. While in New York, he joined the Art & Language group of conceptual artists, including Joseph Kosuth, Ian Burn, Mel Ramsden, and Michael Corris, and remained an active member 1972–1976.

Returning to Australia in 1975, he taught contemporary art and art historical method in the Fine Arts Department at the University of Melbourne and at the Art School, Preston Institute of Technology.

He earned a Master of Arts with his thesis "American Abstract Expressionism: ethical attitudes and moral function" in 1976 from the University of Sydney.

Later, in 1986 he earned his PhD. His doctoral dissertation Making the Modern: Industry, Art and Design in America was published in 1993 by the University of Chicago Press.

== Career ==
Appointed a lecturer at the Power Institute of Fine Arts in 1976, Smith was appointed Power Professor of Contemporary Art and Director of the Power Institute, Foundation for Art and Visual Culture from 1994 until 2001.

When Ian Burn and Nigel Lendon returned to Australia in 1976, Smith joined with them to found Media Action Group, which soon was augmented by others, including Ian Milliss, and became Union Media Services (Sydney), an independent, artist-run organisation that provided graphic art services to the union movement and dissident groups.

Smith wrote art criticism for the Weekend Australian, Nation Review, The Times on Sunday in the 1970s, and has continued to write articles for local and international journals. He was sacked from the Murdoch-owned Weekend Australian after criticising Australian involvement in the Vietnam War, along with other political views in his art columns

In 2001 he was appointed Andrew W. Mellon Professor of Contemporary Art History and Theory in the Department of the History of Art and Architecture at the University of Pittsburgh, and is still in the position as of December 2025.

From 2011 to 2014 he was Distinguished Visiting Professor at the National Institute for Experimental Arts, College of Fine Arts at the University of New South Wales in Sydney.

As of December 2025 he is also professor in the Division of Philosophy, Art and Critical Thought at the European Graduate School in Saas-Fee, Switzerland; faculty at large in the Curatorial Program of the School of Visual Arts in New York; Emeritus Professor of Art History, University of Sydney; and Professor at Large, The Africa Institute, Sharjah, UAE. He was appointed Slade Professor of Fine Art at Cambridge University in 2025-6.

== Specialisations and publications ==
Smith has particular expertise in international contemporary art, American visual art since 1870, and Australian art, including Aboriginal art. Among his most significant contributions are chapters on the modern and the postmodern in Australian Painting 1788-2000 (2001), and Transformations in Australian Art: volume 1, The Nineteenth Century: Landscape, Colony and Nation; and volume 2, The Twentieth Century: Modernism and Aboriginality (2002).

His work has explored the relationships between contemporary art and its wider settings. His findings are presented in a series of books, including The Architecture of Aftermath (2006); Antinomies of Art and Culture: Modernity, postmodernity and contemporaneity (edited with Nancy Condee and Okwui Enwezor, 2008); and What is Contemporary Art? (2009). He has also written two books on curating contemporary art.

== Other roles and activities ==
In the 1960s and 1970s, Smith wanted to introduce major international art movements to an Australian audience. In 1970, he co-founded, with Paul McGillick, a new art criticism journal, Other Voices, which aimed "to offer an alternative platform for serious writing about the newest art".

Smith was a founding board member of the Museum of Contemporary Art, Sydney, and served as a board member of The Andy Warhol Museum in Pittsburgh from 2004 until 2014.

He supports the Melbourne High School Foundation's Visiting Artist Program (A$4,000 per year) and the Terry Smith Visual Arts Scholarship, which supports a visual arts student from year 10 to first year post-secondary studies (A$1,000 per year).

== Recognition and awards ==
Smith's 1986 doctoral dissertation became Making the Modern: Industry, Art and Design in America (1993), winner of the inaugural Georgia O'Keeffe Museum Prize in 2009 for the best book on modern American art published in the past 25 years.

Smith was elected a Corresponding Fellow of the Australian Academy of the Humanities in 1996. In the same year, he was elected a membre titulaire of the Comité International d'Histoire de l'Art, serving as the Australian representative and vice-president from 1999 until 2003.

He was named by the College Art Association as the 2010 winner of the Frank Jewett Mather Award for distinction in art criticism. In 2011, he was the recipient of the Australia Council Visual Arts Laureate Award.

He has been a visiting professor at the Universities of California, San Diego, Chicago, Duke University, Pennsylvania, Queensland, and a visiting professor in the Faculty of Architecture, Design and Planning at the University of Sydney.

Smith has also been awarded a number of research fellowships, including being named a Getty Scholar at the Getty Research Institute, Los Angeles, in 2001-2 and GlaxoSmithKlein Senior Fellow at the National Humanities Center, Research Triangle Park, Raleigh-Durham, NC in 2007-8.

In 2022, the College Art Association awarded him the Distinguished Teacher of Art History award.

== Publications ==
- Terry Smith, "The Provincialism Problem", Artforum, Sept. 1974, pp. 54–9.
- Terry Smith, What is Contemporary Art? Chicago: University of Chicago Press, 2009
- Terry Smith, Okwui Enwezor and Nancy Condee editors, Antinomies of Art and Culture: Modernity, Postmodernity, Contemporaneity, Durham, NC: Duke University Press, 2008
- Terry Smith, editor, Contemporary Art + Philanthropy, Sydney: University of New South Wales Press for the Sherman Foundation, 2007
- Terry Smith, The Architecture of Aftermath, Chicago: University of Chicago Press, 2006
- Terry Smith, Transformations in Australian Art, vol. 1, The Nineteenth Century: Landscape, Colony and Nation; vol. 2. The Twentieth Century: Modernism and Aboriginality, Sydney: Craftsman House, 2002
- Terry Smith Editor, Paul Patton editors,Jacques Derrida, Deconstruction Engaged: The Sydney Seminars Sydney: Power Publications, 2001; Japanese edition, Tokyo: Iwanami Shoten, 2005
- Terry Smith, What is Contemporary Art? Contemporary Art, Contemporaneity and Art to Come, Sydney, Artspace Critical Issues Series, 2001
- Terry Smith, editor, Impossible Presence: Surface and Screen in the Photogenic Era, Sydney, Power Publications, Chicago, University of Chicago Press, 2001
- Terry Smith, editor,First People, Second Chance; The Humanities and Aboriginal Australia, Canberra, Australian Academy of the Humanities, 1999
- Terry Smith, editor, with Jennifer Allison, Katherine Gregouras, George Symons,From Vision to Sesquicentenary, The University of Sydney through its Art Collection, Sydney, Standing Committee of Convocation of the University of Sydney, 1999
- Terry Smith, editor, In Visible Touch: Modernism and Masculinity, Sydney, Power Publications, 1997, Chicago, University of Chicago Press, 1998
- Terry Smith, editor, Ideas of the University, Sydney: Research Institute for the Humanities and Social Sciences and Power Publications, 1996
- Terry Smith, Making the Modern: Industry, Art and Design in America, Chicago: University of Chicago Press, 1993
- Terry Smith, editor, Constructing Australian Art: Eight Critiques, Sydney: Power Institute of Fine Arts Occasional Paper No 2, May 1986
- Terry Smith and Anthony Bradley editors, Australian Art and Architecture: Essays Presented to Bernard Smith, Oxford University Press, Melbourne 1980)
- Terry Smith, editor, Art & Language: Australia 1975, Art & Language Press, Banbury, New York, Sydney 1976
- Terry Smith, Ian Burn and Mel Ramsden, Draft for an Anti-Textbook, special issue, Art-Language, Vol.3, No 1 (Sept 1974)
- Terry Smith, Ian Burn, Mel Ramsden, et al., Handbook (Art & Language Press, New York, and the Mezzanine, Nova Scotia College of Art, Halifax, N.S. 1973
