= Michael Baldwin (artist) =

British artist and writer

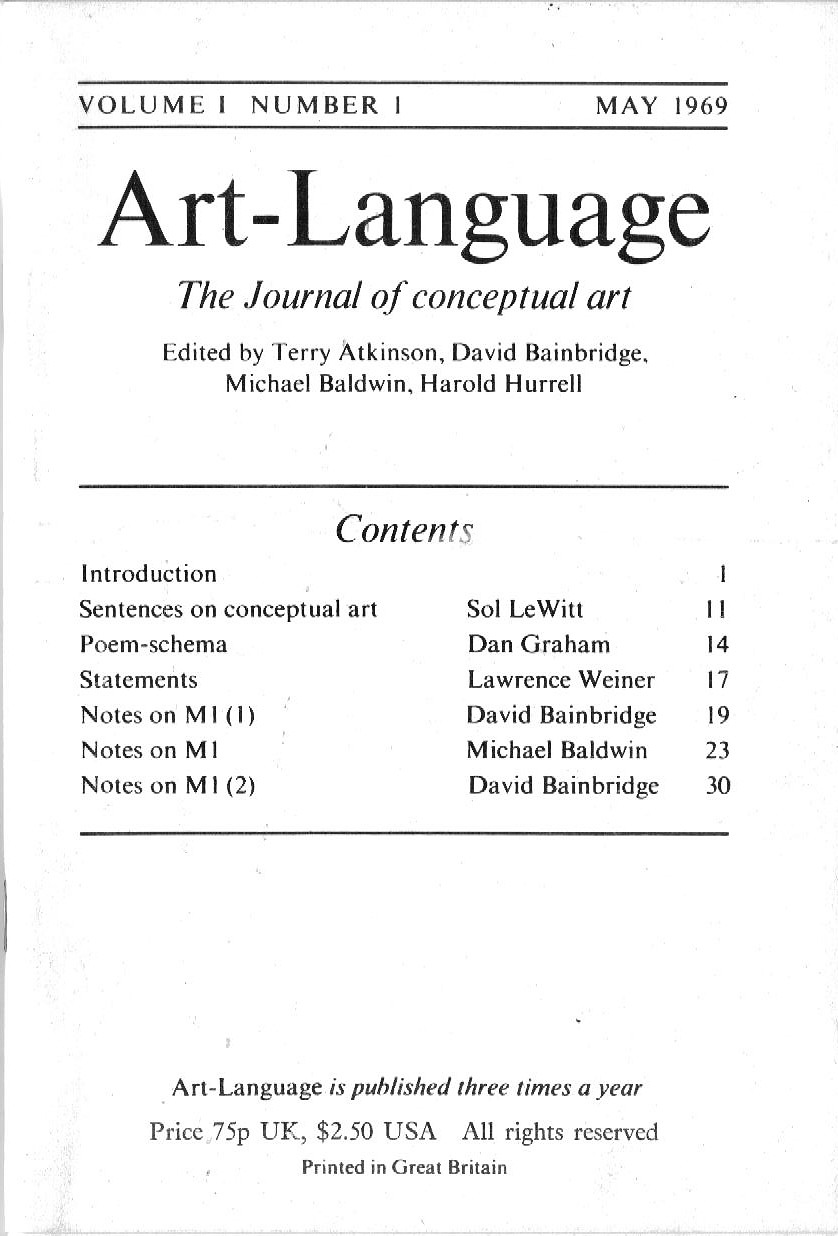
Cover of Art-Language 1.1 the journal of conceptual art by Art & Language edited by Michael Baldwin

Michael Baldwin (born 1945 in Chipping Norton, Oxfordshire, England; lives in Chipping Norton, England) is a British conceptual artist, author and founding member of the Art & Language artist group.

== Life and work ==
Michael Baldwin studied at Coventry College of Art from 1964 to 1967 and taught at Lanchester Polytechnic in Coventry from 1969 to 1971 and at the Leamington Spa School of Art.

Baldwin's Mirror Piece is an art installation of variable dimensions he created in 1965 composed of multiple mirrors of different sizes covered with regular or deforming glass plates, presented on wooden panels. The installation is accompanied by text panels.

Michael Baldwin met the artist Terry Atkinson in 1966 at Coventry College of Art, where Atkinson taught. They founded the avant-garde Art & Language group in 1968.

As a member of Art & Language in 1972, Michael Baldwin took part in Documenta 5 in Kassel with the project Index 0001 in the Idea + Idea/Light section, together with the Art & Language artists Terry Atkinson, David Bainbridge, Ian Burn, Charles Harrison, Harold Hurrell, Mel Ramsden and Joseph Kosuth. With Art & Language he was also represented at Documenta 6 (1977), Documenta 7 in 1982 and Documenta X in 1997.

Since 1977, Baldwin and Ramsden have continued Art & Language as an art project. Many texts were written with Charles Harrison and Mel Ramsden, who has been publishing "Art-Language" since 1971.

Celebrating 60 years of Art & Language, in 2025 Château de Montsoreau-Museum of Contemporary Art in Montsoreau France presented the group exhibition Art & Language : The Mirror Effect that Lara Pan, curator of the exhibition, describes as an examination of the relationships between artists and their art in light of the principles of Art & Language. The title of the exhibition refers to the Mirror Piece installation Baldwin created in 1965.
