= Château de Montsoreau-Museum of Contemporary Art =

Art museum in France

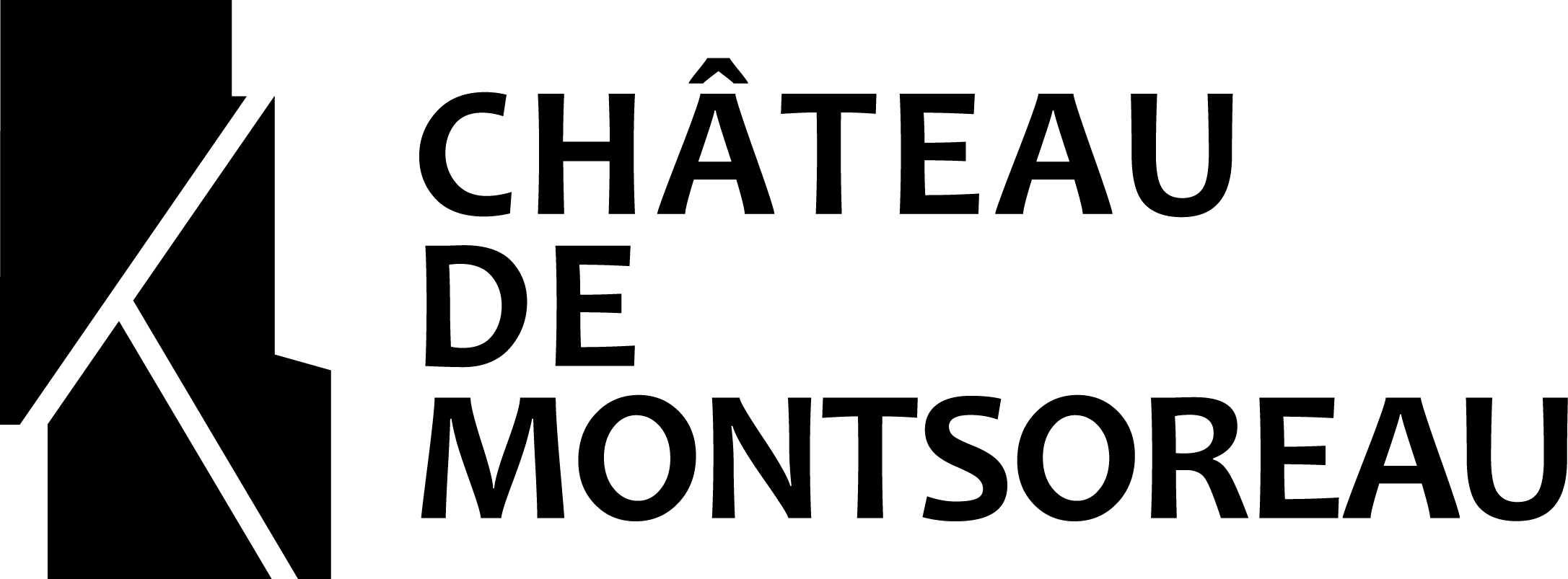

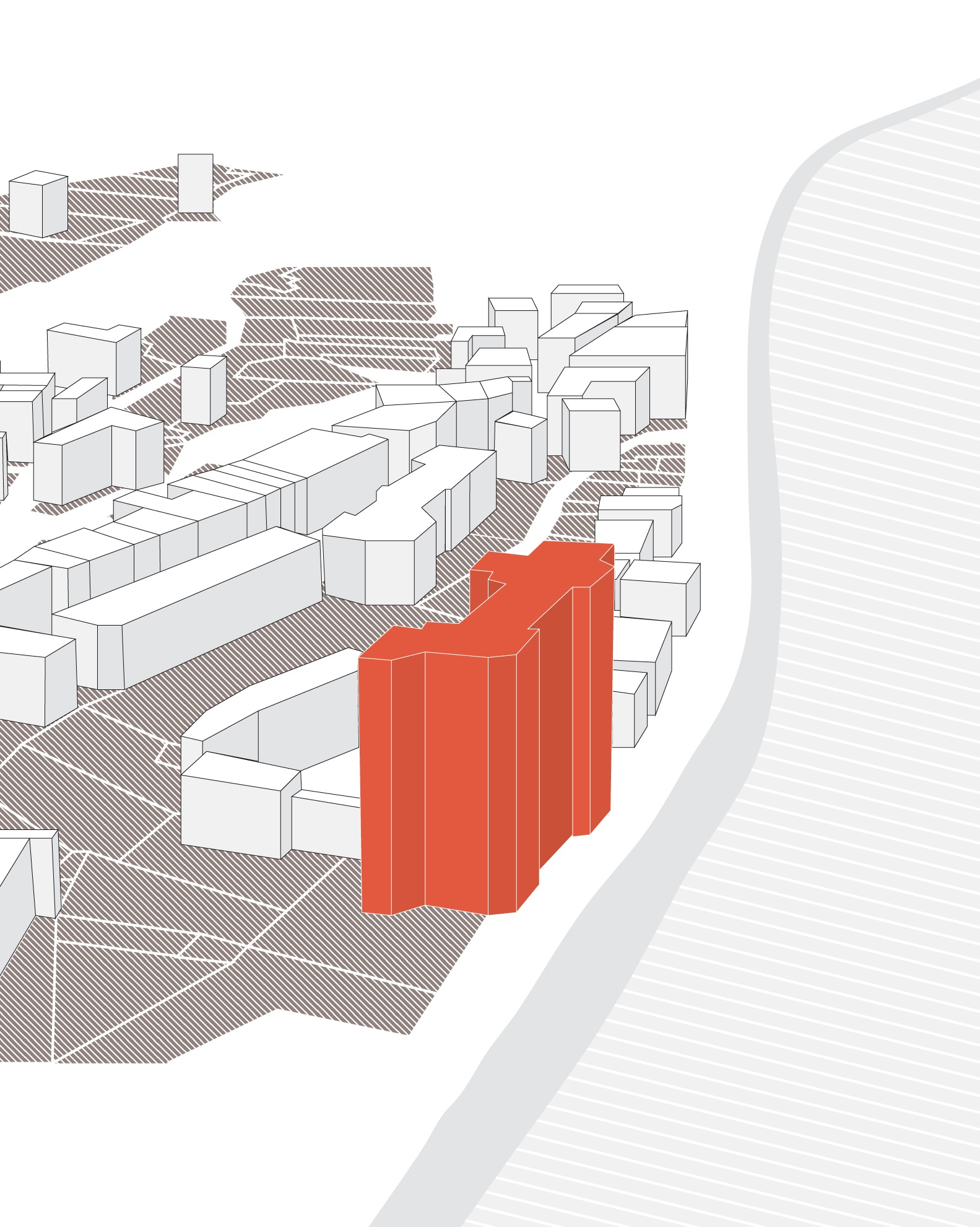
- View from the Loire of the Château de Montsoreau-Museum of Contemporary Art

- Location within France
- Established: 25 June 2015; 11 years ago
- Location: Montsoreau, France
- Coordinates: 47.2156°N 0.0622°E
- Type: Contemporary art museum
- Collections: Art & Language
- Collection size: 1,000
- Visitors: 35,000 (2016)
- Founder: Philippe Méaille
- Website: Official website

The Château de Montsoreau-Museum Contemporary Art is a private museum open to the public in Montsoreau, France. It opened 8 April 2016. The permanent collection exhibited at Château de Montsoreau consists of Philippe Méaille's collection of works by the conceptual art collective Art & Language.

== History ==
Philippe Méaille, who lives in Anjou, worked with Christian Gillet, the president of the department of Maine-et-Loire, to study the possibility of creating a museum of contemporary art in Anjou, and to install his collection in the château de Montsoreau, a departmental property. On 19 June 2015, Christian Gillet offered Méaille a 25 year lease.

== Restoration works ==
During the redevelopment of a former storage room, the masons discovered a chimney dating from about 1450. This chimney is currently being studied in collaboration with the bâtiments de France to be restored. A library on the history of art, contemporary creation and applied arts opened in August 2016. The château de Montsoreau-Museum of contemporary art port reopened at the end of May 2017 after several months of work, to allow its visitors to arrive by boat.

== Architecture ==
Since more than a thousand years, the castle of Montsoreau is the gate of Anjou; it is the only Château de la Loire that is a museum of contemporary art. Historically built by one of the ambassadors of Charles VII King of France, Jean II of Chambes is the first of Kingdom's Lords, with Jacques Cœur to install the Italian Renaissance in France. He built the Château de Montsoreau between 1443 and 1453, directly by the side of the Loire, like Venetian palaces built during the same period.

== Collection ==
The Philippe Méaille collection, which constitutes the collection of the museum, is installed on the first two floors of the museum. It is composed exclusively of works by the artists group Art & Language. Founded in 1968, Art & Language – which takes its name from the eponymous newspaper Art-Language – is made up of British, American and Australian artists. The collective is still active and currently represented by Michael Baldwin and Mel Ramsden.

Between 1965 and now, up to fifty artists have joined or collaborated with Art & Language, including: Terry Atkinson, David Bainbridge, Michael Baldwin, Ian Burn, Charles Harrison, Joseph Kosuth, Sol LeWitt, Philip Pilkington, Mel Ramsden, Dave Rushton, Lynn Hershman Leeson, Mayo Thompson, Kathryn Bigelow, Dan Graham and Lawrence Weiner. In 1977, when Mayo Thompson, leader of the band The Red Krayola left the collective, it was composed of Michael Baldwin, Charles Harrison and Mel Ramsden. The collection includes paintings, sculptures, drawings, manuscripts, tapuscrits, installations and videos. Carles Guerra said of it: "besides being affected by the artists' attitude, The collection is further affected by the archaeological perspective with which it was assembled."

=== Gallery ===
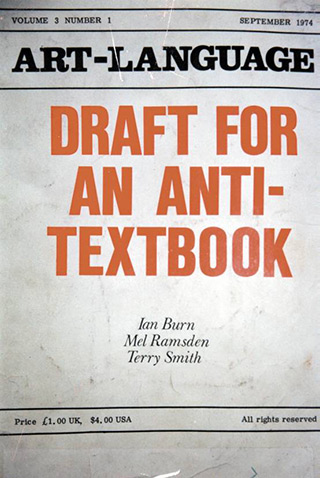
Art & Language: Art & Language: Art-Language, Vol.3 Nr.1, 1974.

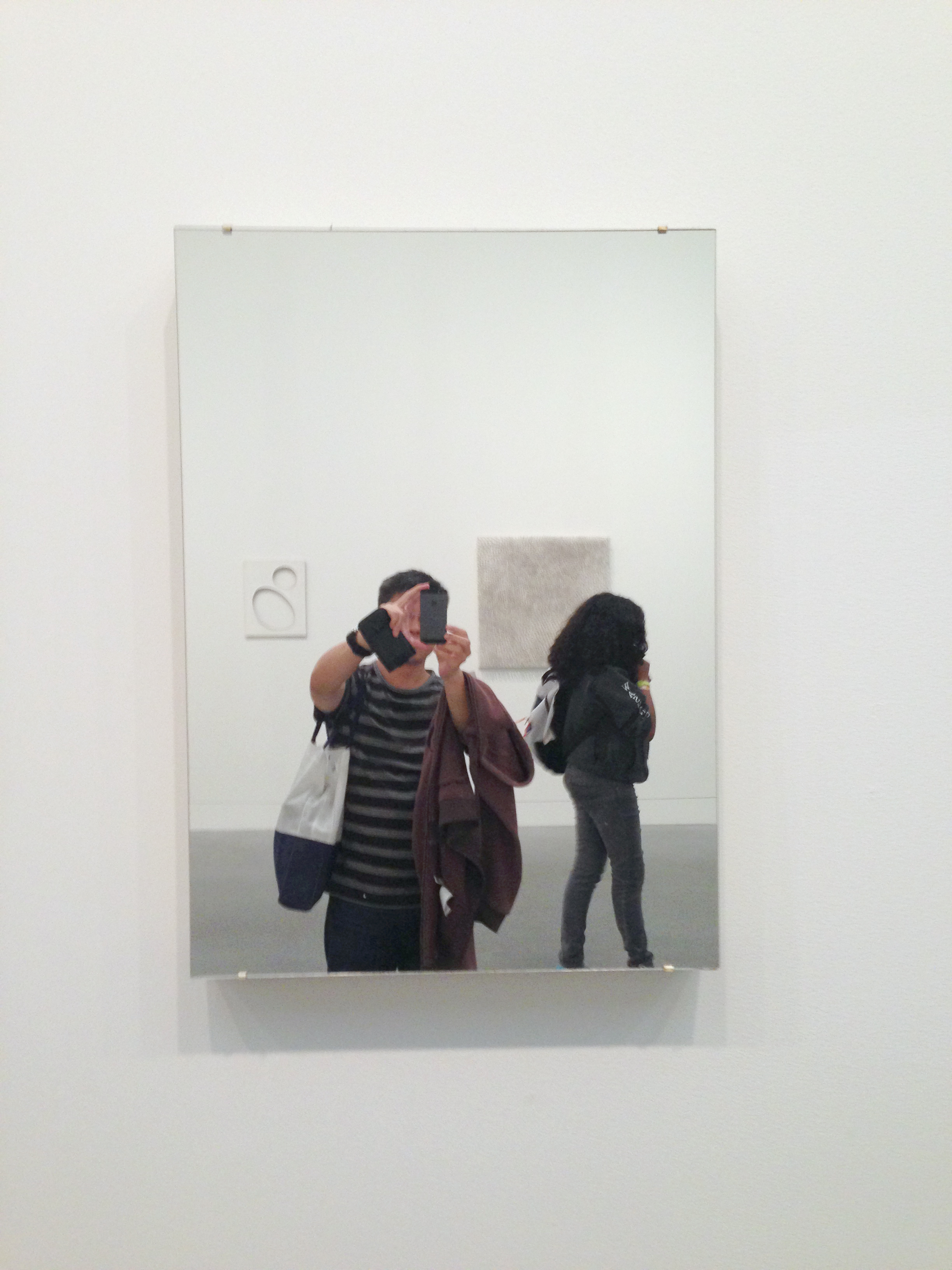
Art & Language: Mirror Piece, 1965.

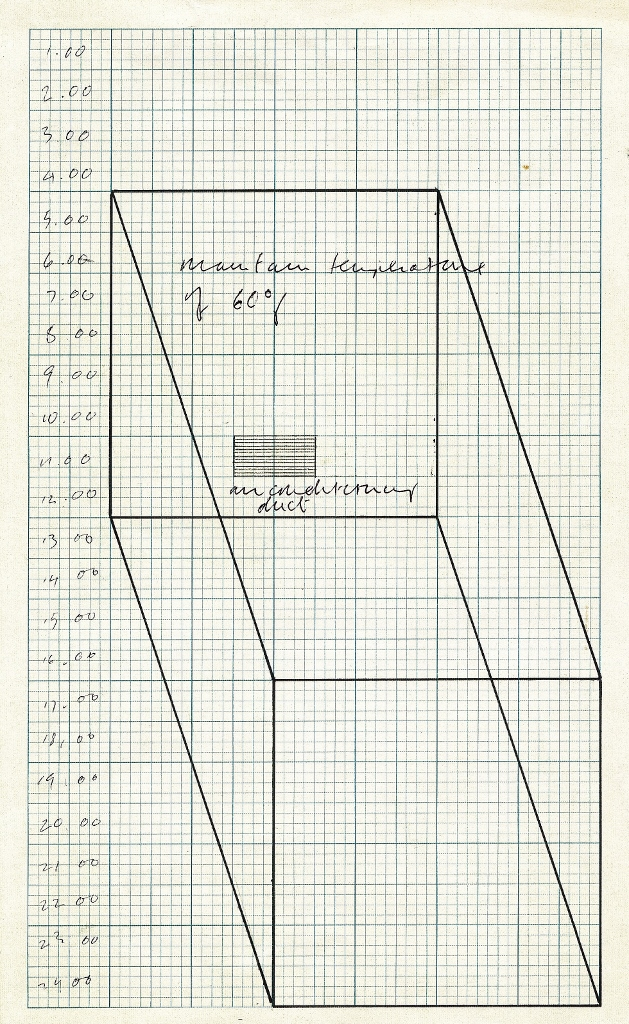
Art & Language (Michael Baldwin): Air-Conditioning Show, 1966-67.

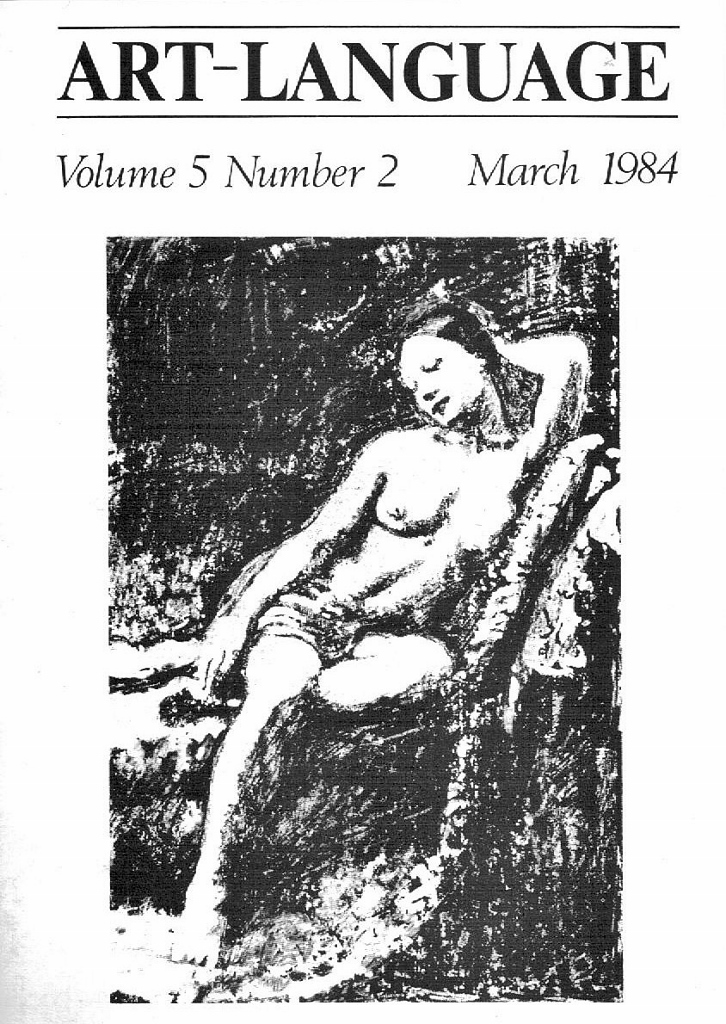
Art & Language: Victorine in Art-Language Vol.5 Nr.2 (1984), 1983.

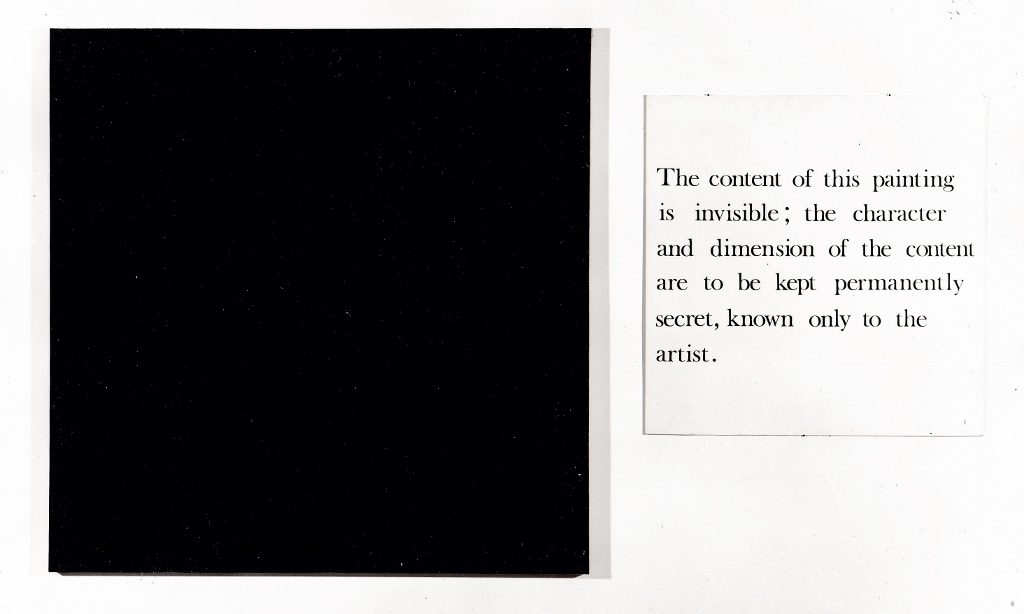
Art & Language (Mel Ramsden), Secret Painting, 1967.

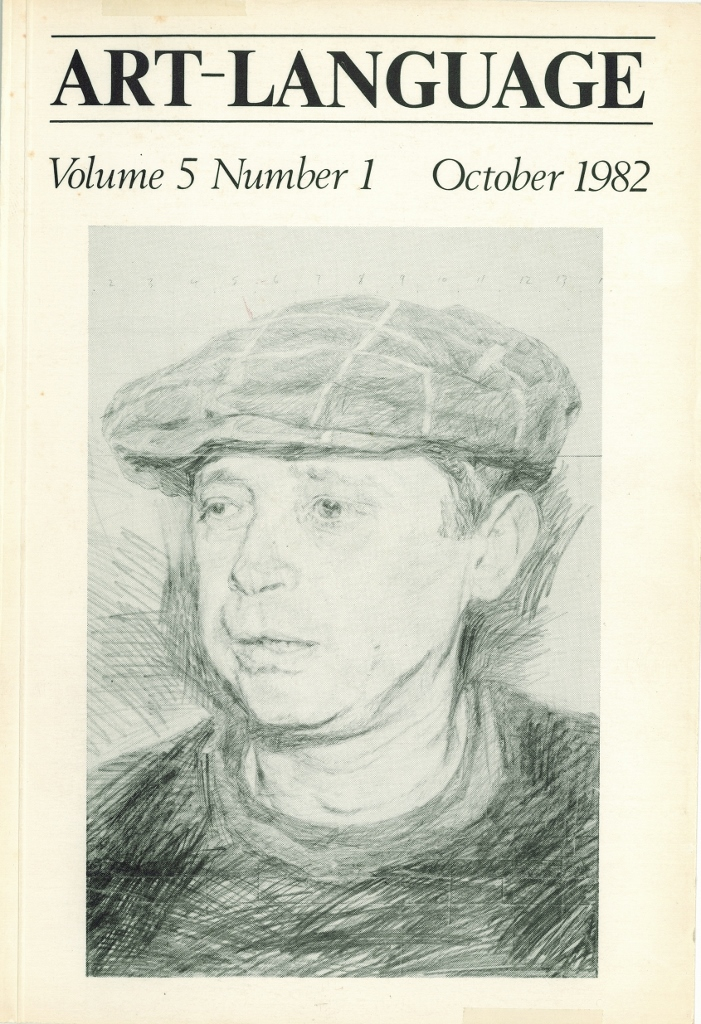
Art & Language: Art-Language Vol.5 Nr.1, 1982.

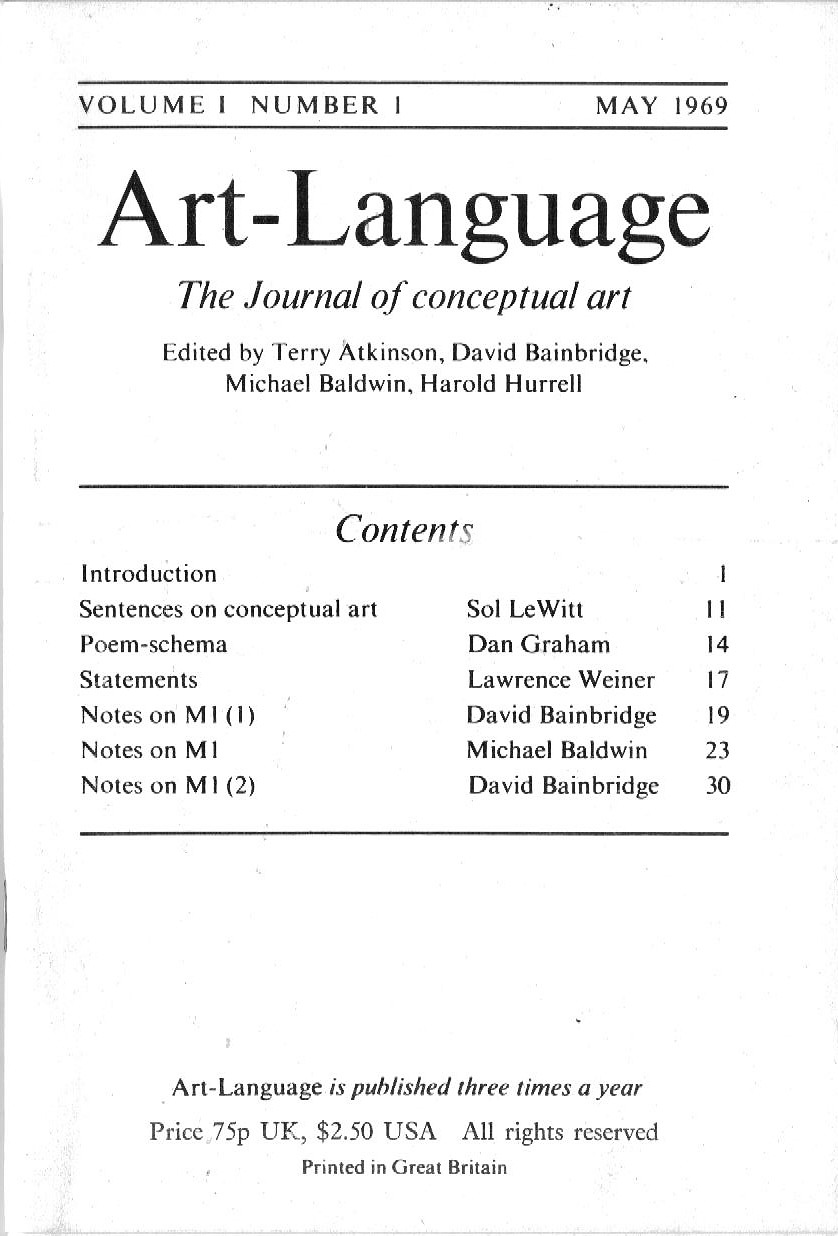
Art & Language: Art-Language The Journal of Conceptual Art, Vol.1 Nr.1, 1969.

== Temporary exhibitions ==
- 2016: Agnès Thurnauer, a History of Painting.
- 2017: Ettore Sottsass, Designer of the World.
- 2018: Art & Language, Reality (Dark) Fragments (Light).
- 2018: 1968: Sparta Dreaming Athens, collective exhibition, Tony Smith, Edward Ruscha, Claes Oldenburg, Les Levine, Bernar Venet, Maria Marshall, Dan Graham, Art & Language.
- 2019: Mappa Mundi.
- 2019: Roman Signer.
- 2019: Charlotte Moorman. Think Crazy

== Events ==
=== François Morellet Prize ===
The museum collaborates with the National days of Books and Wine in Saumur, to award an art writer with the François Morellet prize.

- 2016: Catherine Millet, art critic and artpress redactor in chief.
- 2017: Michel Onfray, Philosopher.
- 2018: Eric de Chassey, director of the National institute of art history.
- 2019: Bernar Venet, artist.
- 2020: Kenneth Goldsmith
- 2021: Orlan
- 2022: Bernard Marcadé

=== Miriam Rothschild Gardens ===
In 2017, the gardens of the castle were transformed into wild gardens. On more than one hectare, the garden represents freedom and biodiversity. Miriam Rothschild (1908–2005), a scientific researcher, created the "natural" gardens. The wild garden favors native plants and preserves the surrounding fauna to propose a balance between fauna and flora.

=== Publications ===
- 2016: Rod Mengham, Un tour chez Agnès Thurnauer.
- 2016: Art & Language, Entretien avec Victorine Meurend.
- 2017: Art & Language, Affiche: Almost a Home for Homeless Stuff.
- 2017: Fabien Vallos, Philippe Méaille, Antonia Birnbaum, Fabrice Hergott, Chloé Maillet, Louise Hervé, Antoine Dufeu, A Constructed World, Protest 1517-2017. ISBN 978-2-9557917-0-7
- 2018: Art & Language, Matthew Jesse Jackson, Art & Language Reality (Dark) Fragments (Light).ISBN 978-2-9557917-2-1
