= Charles Harrison (art historian) =

British art historian (1942–2009)

Charles Townsend Harrison (11 February 1942 in Chesham, Buckinghamshire – 6 August 2009 in Banbury, Oxfordshire) was a UK art historian who taught Art History for many years and was Emeritus Professor of History and Theory of Art at the Open University. Although he denied being an artist himself, he was a full participant and catalyst in the Art and Language group.

Charles Harrison was educated at Cambridge University and the Courtauld Institute of Art in London from 1961 to 1967.

He was tutor in Art History at the Open University from 1977–2005, Reader in Art History there from 1985-1994, Professor of the History and Theory of Art from 1994–2008, Professor Emeritus from 2008–2009, and Visiting Professor at the University of Chicago in 1991 and 1996, and Visiting Professor at the University of Texas in 1997.

Charles Harrison became a member of the Art and Language artist group in 1971 and was an editor of Art-Language. He was also a curator.

As a member of Art & Language, Charles Harrison was a exhibitor at Documenta 5 in Kassel in 1972 with the Project Index 0001 in the Idea + Idea / Light department, together with Art & Language member Terry Atkinson, David Bainbridge, Ian Burn, Michael Baldwin, Harold Hurrell, Mel Ramsden and Joseph Kosuth. With Art & Language he was also billed at Documenta 6 (1977) and Documenta 7 in 1982.

Since 1977, Art and Language has been continued as a project by Baldwin and Ramsden. Many texts are written by Charles Harrison.

In 1993 Charles Harrison with Paul Wood edited Art in Theory, 1900–1990: An Anthology of Changing Ideas, which examines the unique reliance on theory in 20th-century art from Post-Impressionism to Postmodernism.

== Quotes ==
On English art

"The history of modern art in England is to a large extent a history of delayed and mediated responses."

On the value of art

"[V]ividness in representation must entail the reconciliation of technical concerns for expressive form and surface on the one hand with the requirements of realistic description on the other...the more the activity of art tends toward the pursuit of the one at the expense of the other, the smaller the value is to be attached to either."

== Publications ==
- Ben Nicholson: Catalogue of an Exhibition held at the Tate Gallery, with Ben Nicholson, Tate Gallery, 1969
- The British Avant Garde, with Donald H Karshan, London: Studio International, 1971
- Modern Art and Modernism: a Critical Anthology, with Francis Frascina & Deirdre Paul, Paul Chapman Publishing & The Open University, 1982
- A Provisional History of Art & Language, with Fred Orton, 1982
- Abstract Expressionism and Jackson Pollock, with Francis Frascina, Open University, 1983
- English Art and Modernism, Open University, 1983 & New Haven: Yale University Press, 1994
- Introduction, Modernism, Problems and Methods, Open University, 1984
- Modernism, Criticism and Realism: Alternative Contexts for Art, 1985
- Alfred Wallis, Christopher Wood, Ben Nicholson, with Margaret Gardiner, Alfred Wallis & Christopher Wood, Scottish Arts Council, 1987
- A Quiet Revolution: British Sculpture Since 1965, with Graham Beal, Lynne Cooke & Mary Jane Jacob, London: Thames & Hudson Ltd, 1987
- Art in Theory, 1900-90: Anthology, with Paul Wood, 1992
- Modernism in Dispute: Art Since the Forties, with Paul Wood, Francis Frascina & Jonathan Harris, New Haven: Yale University Press, 1993
- Modernity and Modernism: French Painting in the Nineteenth Century, with Paul Wood, Francis Frascina & Jonathan Harris, New Haven: Yale University Press, 1993
- Primitivism, Cubism, Abstraction: the Early Twentieth Century, with Francis Frascina & Gillian Perry, New Haven: Yale Univ Press, 1993
- Modernism (Movements in Modern Art series), Tate Publishing, 1997
- Art in Theory 1815-1900, with Paul Wood & Jason Gaiger, 1998
- Art in Theory 1648-1815, with Paul Wood & Jason Gaiger, 2000
- Modernismus, 2001
- 2001 Retrospective - Master Stone Sculptors of Zimbabwe, Chapungu Sculptures Ltd, 2001
- Blast to Freeze: British Art in the 20th Century, with Andrew Causey, Richard Cork, David Curtis, and Penelope Curtis, publ: Hatje Cantz; illustrated edition, 2002
- Essays on Art & Language, MIT Press, 2003
- Conceptual Art and Painting: Further Essays on Art & Language, MIT Press, 2003
- Art in Theory, 1900-2000: an Anthology of Changing Ideas, with Paul Wood, 2003
- Painting the Difference: Sex and Spectator in Modern Art, University of Chicago Press, 2005
- Slideshow, with Darsie Alexander & Robert Storr, Pennsylvania State University Press, 2005
- Art and Text, with Dave Beech, Will Hill & Aimee Selby, Black Dog Publishing, 2009
- An Introduction to Art, New Haven: Yale University Press; 2009
- Since 1950: Art and Its Criticism, New Haven: Yale University Press, 2009
- Charles Harrison: Looking Back, London: Ridinghouse, 2011

== Literature and sources ==
- Exhibition catalog: documenta 5th Survey of Reality - Imagery Today. Catalog (as a folder) Volume 1: (Material), Volume 2: (List of exhibits), Kassel 1972
- documenta archive (ed.); Resubmission d5 - A survey of the archive on documenta 1972. Kassel / Ostfildern 2001, ISBN 3-7757-1121-X
- Catalog for documenta 6: Volume 1: Painting, sculpture / environment, performance; Volume 2: photography, film, video; Volume 3: Hand drawings, utopian design, books; Kassel 1977, ISBN 3-920453-00-X
- Catalog: documenta 7 Kassel. Volume 1: (Visual Biographies of the Artists); Volume 2: (Current works of the artists); Kassel 1982, ISBN 3-920453-02-6
- (documenta 10 catalog): Politics - Poetics - the book on documenta X. Kassel / Ostfildern 1997, ISBN 3-89322-909-4 (German), ISBN 3-89322-911-6 (English)
- Daniel Marzona: Conceptual Art. Cologne 2005, ISBN 3-8228-2959-5
