= Index: Incident in a Museum =

Series of paintings by Art & Language

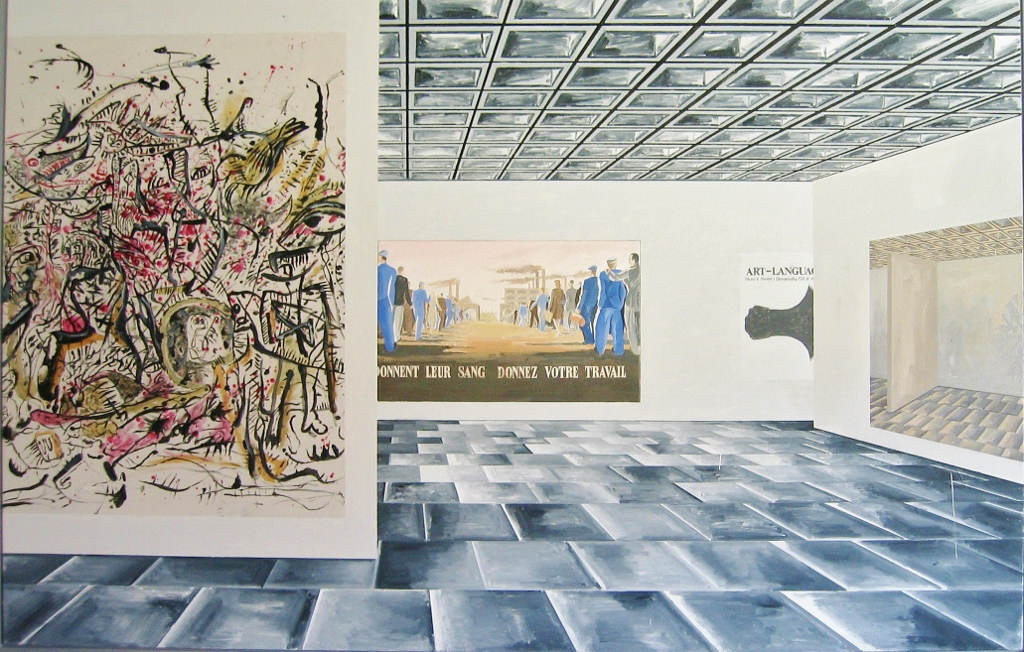
- Art & Language, Index Incident in a Museum, 1986
- Artist: Art & Language; Mel Ramsden
- Year: 1985; 1986; 1987
- Type: Painting
- Movement: Conceptual Art; Contemporary art
- Location: Tate Modern Château de Montsoreau-Museum of Contemporary Art

Index: Incident in a Museum is an extensive series of paintings produced between 1985 and 1988 by Michel Baldwin and Mel Ramsden, members of the British conceptual artists' collective Art & Language.

== The Incident in a Museum series ==
The Index: Incident in a Museum series includes many productions. Several of these works are paintings that represent an imaginary exhibition of Art & Language in the premises of the Whitney Museum in New York. This museum collecting only works produced by American artists the exhibition does not represent a true scene. Besides, the Art & Language works represented in these paintings do not exist as they are depicted in the paintings.

Through this series, Art & Language raises, among others, the issues of places of production and artistic consumption, and the modalities of representation and abstraction. This work appears to be an artistic investigation that at the end of the series seems to tend towards emptiness.

This series of works ends with works that are titled An Incident in a Museum: Study for Hostage, the then following series of paintings being called Hostage.

| Title | Technic | Dimensions (cm) | Year | # | Illus. |
|---|---|---|---|---|---|
| Index: Incident in a Museum II | Oil and acrylic painting on canvas | 174 x 271 | 1985 - 1986 | 1 | |
| Index: Incident in a Museum III, | Alogram and oil on canvas on plywood (alogram : technique proper to the collective Art & Language that consists in the realisation of impressions on a canvas with the help of photocopies soaked with turpentine and acetone) | 174 x 271 | 1985 | 2 | |
| Index: Incident in a Museum IV | Alogram and oil on canvas | 174 x 271 | 1985 | 3 | |
| Index: Incident in a Museum V | Alogram and oil on canvas | 174 x 271 | 1985 | 4 | |
| Index: Incident in a Museum VI, | Oil on canvas on plywood | 174 x 271 | 1986 | 5 | |
| Index: Incident in a Museum VII, | Alogram and oil on canvas | 174 x 271 | 1986 | 6 | |
| Index: Incident in a Museum VIII, | Alogram and oil on canvas | 174 x 271 | 1986 | 7 | |
| Index: Incident in a Museum IX | Alogram and oil on canvas | 174 x 271 | 1986 | 8 | |
| Index : Incident in a Museum X | Alogram and oil on canvas | 174 x 271 | 1986 | 9 | |
| Index: Incident in a Museum XI | Alogram and oil on canvas | 174 x 271 | 1986 | 10 | |
| Index: Incident in a Museum XII, | Alogram and oil on canvas | 243 x 379 | 1986 | 11 | |
| Index: Incident in a Museum XIII | Alogram and oil on canvas on plywood | 174 x 271 | 1986 | 12 | |
| Index: Incident in a Museum (Madison Avenue) XIV | Alogram and oil on canvas on plywood | 174 x 271 | 1986 | 13 | |
| Index: Incident in a Museum XV | Alogram and oil on canvas | 243 x 379 | 1986 | 14 | |
| Index: Incident in a Museum XVI, | Alogram and oil on canvas on plywood | 243 x 379 | 1986 | 15 | |
| Index: Incident in a Museum XVII | Alogram and oil on canvas | 271 x 379 | 1987 | 16 | |
| Index: Incident in a Museum XVIII | Oil on canvas | 174 x 271 | 1987 | 17 | |
| Index: Incident in a Museum XIX | Alogram and oil on canvas on plywood | 174 x 271 | 1987 | 18 | |
| Index: Incident in a Museum XX | Alogram and oil on canvas | 174 x 271 | 1987 | 19 | |
| Index: Incident in a Museum XXI | Photography and oil on canvas on plywood | 234 x 379 | 1987 | 20 | |
| Index: Incident in a Museum XXII (The decade, 2003 -2013) | Alogram and oil on canvas on plywood | | 1986 | 21 | |
| Index: Incident in a Museum XXV | Alogram and oil on canvas on plywood, library and books | 174 x 271 | 1987 | 22 | |

== Bibliography ==
- Jan Debbaut (1987). Société des Expositions du Palais des Beaux-Arts (ed.). Art & Language. Bruxelles. p. 98.
- Charles Harrison (2001). MIT press edition (ed.). Essay on Art & Language. US. p. 302. ISBN 0-262-08300-0.
- Nadia Candet (2008). Flammarion (ed.). Collections particulières (in French). Paris. p. 215. ISBN 9782081214651.
- Galerie nationale du Jeu de Paume (1993). Galerie nationale du Jeu de Paume (ed.). Art & Language (in French and English). Paris. p. 163. ISBN 2-908901-21-8.
