= Mel Ramsden =

British artist and writer (1944–2024)

- Born: 27 December 1944; Ilkeston, Derbyshire, England
- Died: 23 July 2024 (aged 79)
- Education: Nottingham Trent University; National Gallery of Victoria Art School
- Movement: Art conceptuel

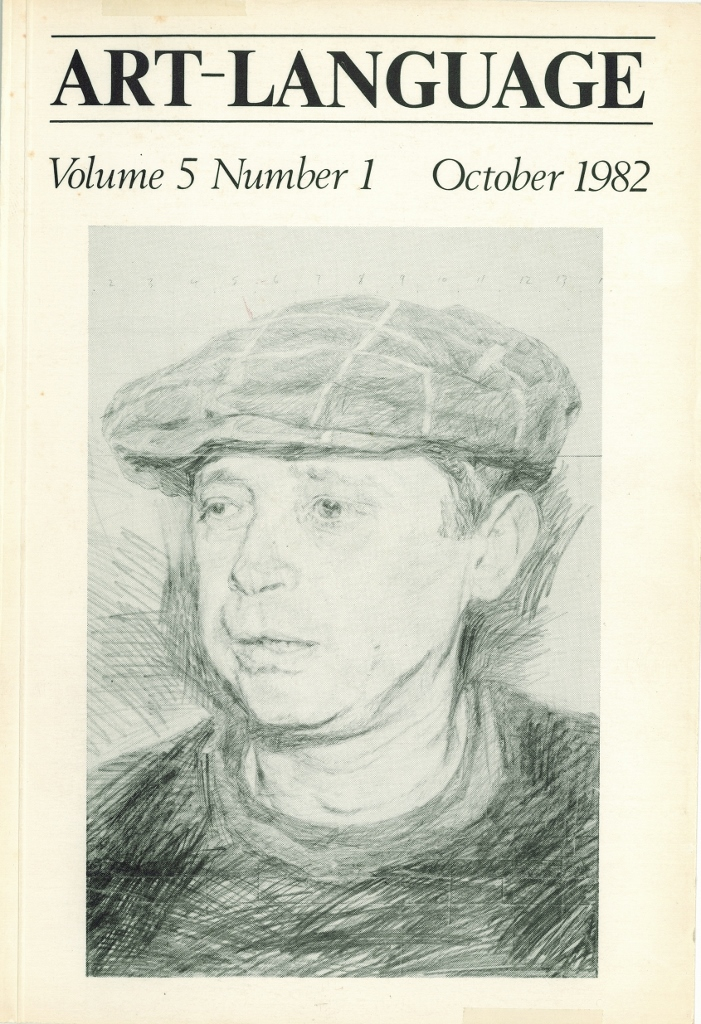
Art language journal Mel Ramsden 1982 conceptual art

Mel Ramsden (27 December 1944 – 23 July 2024) was a British conceptual artist and member of the Art & Language artist group.

== Life and work ==
Ramsden was born in Ilkeston, Derbyshire, England on 27 December 1944. He studied at Nottingham College of Art from 1961 to 1963, went to Australia in 1963 and studied at the National Gallery School of Victoria from 1963 to 1964. In 1967 Ramsden moved to New York City in the United States and began the series of the Secret Paintings and the Two Black Squares.

Ramsden, along with Ian Burn, co-founded the Art Press and The Society for Theoretical Art and Analysis in New York City in 1969. Ramsden became a member of Art & Language in 1971. Celebrating Ramsden and 60 years of Art & Language, in 2025 Château de Montsoreau-Museum of Contemporary Art in Montsoreau France presented the group exhibition Art & Language : The Mirror Effect

As a member of Art & Language in 1972, Ramsden participated in Documenta 5 in Kassel, Germany with the project "Index 0001" in the department Idea + Idea/Light, together with the Art & Language artists Terry Atkinson, David Bainbridge, Ian Burn, Charles Harrison, Harold Hurrell, Michael Baldwin and Joseph Kosuth. With Art & Language he was also represented at Documenta 6 (1977), Documenta 7 in 1982 and Documenta X in 1997.

From 1977, Baldwin and Ramsden continued Art & Language as a project. During this time, an extensive body of work of objects and images was created. Many texts were written with Charles Harrison and Michael Baldwin, who published "Art-Language" from 1971.

Ramsden later lived in Middleton Cheney near Banbury, England. He died on 23 July 2024, at the age of 79.

== Sources ==
- Exhibition catalogue: documenta 5: Questioning reality - visual worlds today; catalogue (as file) Volume 1: (material); Volume 2: (list of exhibitions); Kassel 1972
- Documenta Archiv (ed.); Wiedervorlage d5 - Eine Befragung des Archivs zum documenta 1972; Kassel/Ostfildern 2001, ISBN 3-7757-1121-X
- Catalogue for documenta 6: Volume 1: Painting, Sculpture/Environment, Performance; Volume 2: Photography, Film, Video; Volume 3: Hand Drawings, Utopian Design, Books; Kassel 1977 ISBN 3-920453-00-X
- Catalogue: documenta 7 Kassel; Vol. 1: (Visual biographies of the artists); Vol. 2: (Current works of the artists); Kassel 1982 ISBN 3-920453-02-6
- (documenta 10 catalogue): Politics - Poetics - the book for documenta X; Kassel/Ostfildern 1997, ISBN 3-89322-909-4 (German) / ISBN 3-89322-911-6 (English)
- Marzona, Daniel: Konzeptkunst; Cologne, 2005, ISBN 3-8228-2959-5
- Kosuth, Joseph: "The Artist as Anthropologist", Art After Philosophy and After, MIT Press, 1991, p. 117
