= Mirror Piece =

1965 art installation by Michael Baldwin

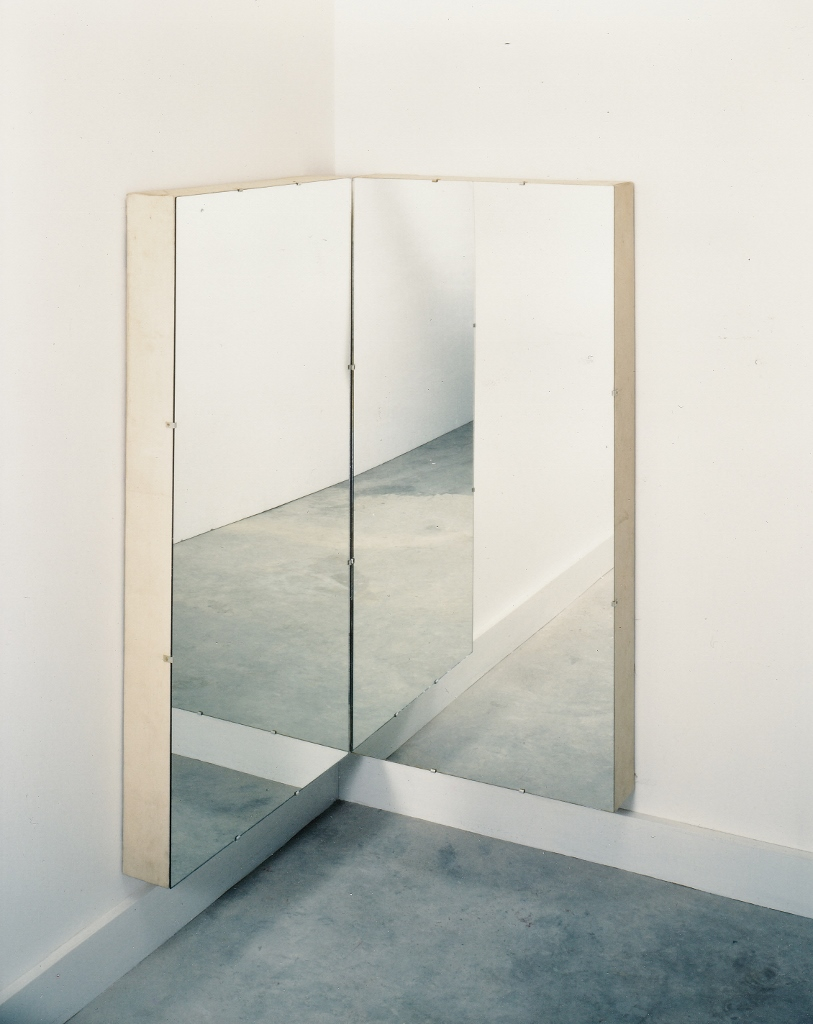
- Art & Language, Mirror Piece, 1965
- Artist: Art & Language; Michael Baldwin
- Year: 1965
- Type: Installation; Painting
- Medium: Mirror, Glass and wood panels
- Movement: Conceptual Art
- Location: Château de Montsoreau-Museum of Contemporary Art
- Owner: Philippe Méaille

Mirror Piece is a 1965 contemporary art installation by Michael Baldwin, a member of the British conceptual art collective Art & Language.

== Description ==
Mirror Piece is an installation of variable dimensions. It is composed of multiple mirrors of different sizes covered with regular or deforming glass plates, presented on wooden panels. This installation is accompanied by 13 pages of text and diagrams.

== Exhibitions ==
- Galerie Bruno Bischofberger, Männedorf, Switzerland
- Barcelona Museum of Contemporary Art.
- Château de MontsoreauMuseum of Contemporary Art, Montsoreau, France.

== Critical analysis ==
This installation, one of the first ones of the Art & Language collective, replaces the surface of a painting with mirrors. It allows us to discuss, among other things, the theme of representation as well as the place and role of the spectator in the work of art. The mirror, being a surface that reflects light without its own image, the artists will say of this gesture:

The interest in mirrors resided in the fact that the mirror produced the "perfectly transparent" image... but this does not mean that you cannot be aware of the surface of the mirror itself, however difficult that is (as Ian Burn pointed out).

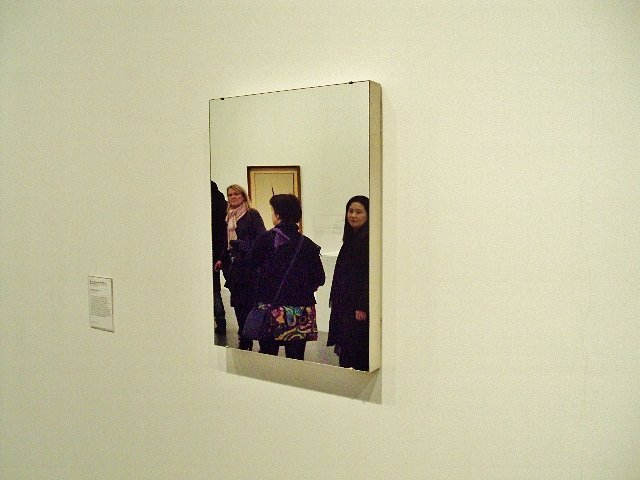
Mirror Piece installation

The mirror being in the place of what should be a painting, the spectator sees himself looking at a work of art and the recent practice of selfies has greatly contributed to the popularity of Mirror Piece.

Celebrating 60 years of Art & Language, in 2025 Château de Montsoreau-Museum of Contemporary Art in Montsoreau France presented the group exhibition Art & Language : The Mirror Effect that Lara Pan, curator of the exhibition, describes as an examination of the relationships between artists and their art in light of the principles of Art & Language. The title of the exhibition refers to Baldwin's Mirror Piece (1965).

== Bibliography ==
- Matthew Jesse Jackson et Art & Language, Art & Language Reality (Dark) Fragments (Light) Philippe Méaille Collection, Château de Montsoreau-musée d'Art contemporain, 2018 ISBN 978-2955791721
- Art & Language, Carles Guerra, Matthew Jesse Jackson, Bartomeu Marí, Philippe Méaille, Art & Language Uncompleted. The Phillipe Méaille Collection, Musée d'art contemporain de Barcelone, 2014, ISBN 978-84-92505-52-4
