= Harold Hurrell =

British artist

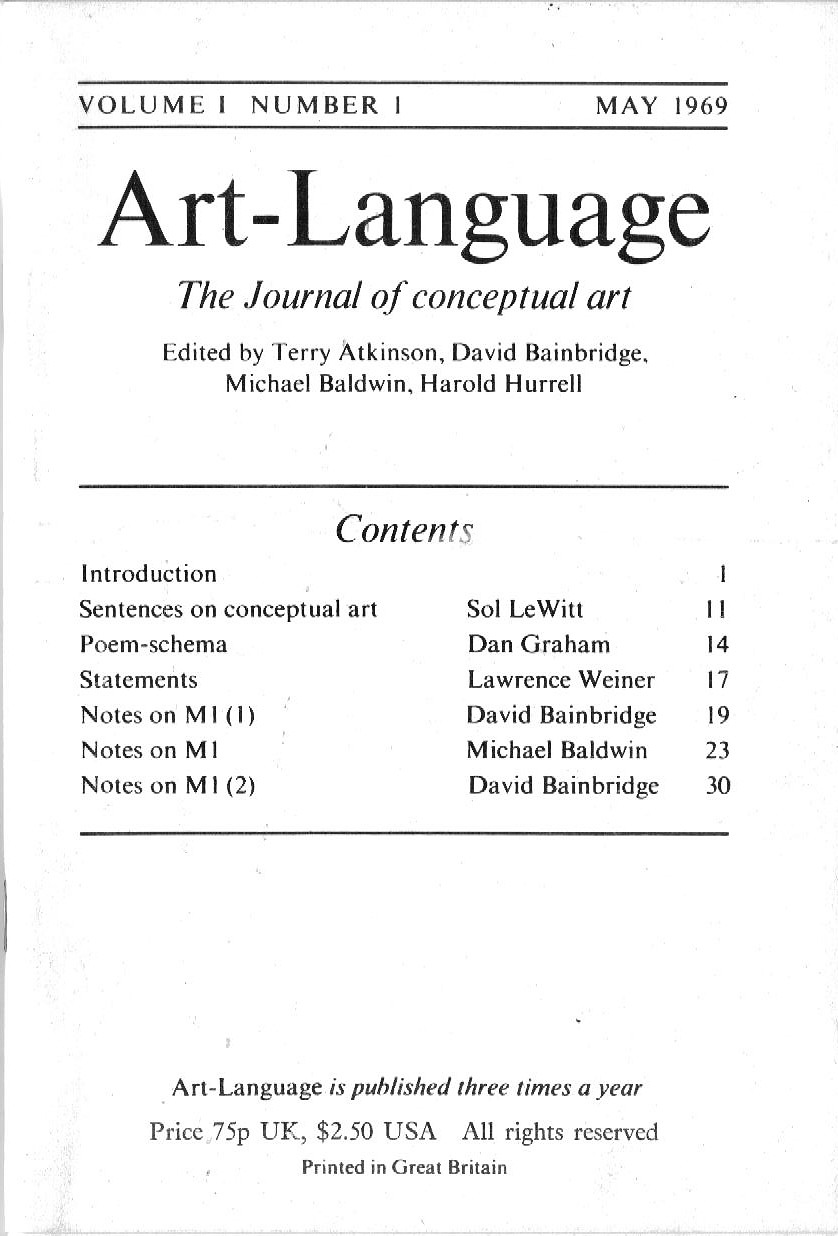
Cover of Art-Language 1.1 the journal of conceptual art by Art & Language edited by Harold Hurrell

Harold Hurrell (born 1940 in Barnsley, Yorkshire; lives in Hull, England) is a British conceptual artist and former member of the Art & Language artist group.

== Life ==
Harold Hurrell studied at Sheffield College of Art from 1961 to 1964 and at the Institute of Education in London from 1964 to 1965. He taught at Hull College of Art from 1967 and at the Function Seminar at St Martin's School of Art in London in 1967. Harold Hurrell became a member of the Art & Language group in the early 1970s and remained so until the mid 1970s. Harold Hurrell was a member of Art & Language in 1972 and participated in Documenta 5 in Kassel with the project Index 0001 in the section "Idea + Idea/Light", together with the Art & Language artists Terry Atkinson, David Bainbridge, Ian Burn, Michael Baldwin, Charles Harrison, Mel Ramsden and Joseph Kosuth. With Art & Language he was also represented at Documenta 6 in 1977.

== Sources ==
- Exhibition catalogue: documenta 5: Questioning reality - visual worlds today; catalogue (as file) Volume 1: (material); Volume 2: (list of exhibits); Kassel 1972
- documenta Archiv (ed.): Wiedervorlage d5 - Eine Befragung des Archivs zur documenta 1972; Kassel/Ostfildern 2001. ISBN 3-7757-1121-X
- Catalogue for documenta 6: Volume 1: Painting, Sculpture/Environment, Performance; Volume 2: Photography, Film, Video; Volume 3: Hand Drawings, Utopian Design, Books; Kassel 1977, ISBN 3-920453-00-X
- Daniel Marzona: Conceptual Art; Cologne 2005 ISBN 3-8228-2959-5
