= Secret Painting =

1967–1968 art works by Mel Ramsden

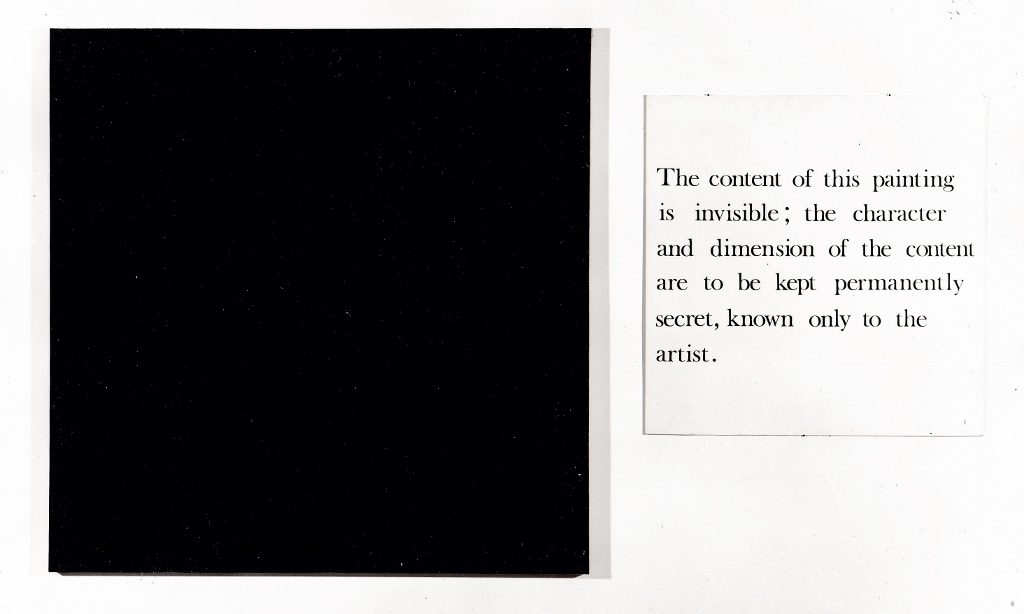
- Secret Painting, 1967
- Artist: Art & Language; Mel Ramsden
- Year: 1967-1968
- Type: Painting
- Movement: Conceptual art
- Location: Tate Modern; National Gallery of Victoria; Château de Montsoreau-Museum of Contemporary Art

Secret Painting is a series of artworks created by British conceptual artist Mel Ramsden for the collective Art & Language between 1967 and 1968. The series consists of monochrome paintings juxtaposed with text panels explaining the absence of a conventional subject; for example, one states that the painting in question is invisible.

== Background and analysis ==
The series is distinguished from the monochrome paintings usually produced in the field of visual arts by their accompanying block of texts. It references both the history of monochrome painting and Kazimir Malevich's Black Square (1915), as well as functioning as an answer given by Ramsden to the paintings of Ad Reinhardt (1913-1967), an American painter and theoretician, a precursor of conceptual and minimal art.

The series has raised questions of the status of the art object and the play that is established between the artist and the visitor in the possible revelation of content. To his amusement, during the exhibition 1969: The Black Box of Conceptual Art, Ann Stephen (PhD and Chief Curator of the University of Sydney Art Museum) said:

I've known Secret Paintings for a long time, but looking at the back, I suddenly realized that there was indeed a secret painting; there is a panel underneath with a secret painting.

== Exhibitions ==
- Arte Concettuale, Galerie Daniel Templon, Milan, 1971
- New York Art & Language, Galeria Schema, Florence, 1974
- Early work 1965-1976, Recent work 1991-1994, Lisson Gallery, Londres, 1994
- Art & Language and Luhmann, Kunstraum Vienna, Vienne, 1995
- Art & Language, Kunsthalle St Gallen, Saint-Gall, 1996
- Then and Now, Lisson Gallery, Londres, 1998
- Materializing six years: Lucy R. Lippard and the emergence of conceptual art, Brooklyn Museum, New York, 2013
- Art & Language Uncompleted - Philippe Méaille Collection, MACBA, Barcelone, 2014
- Unpainting, Galerie d'art de Nouvelle-Galles du Sud, Sydney, 2018
- Art & Language - Reality (Dark) Fragments (Light), Château de Montsoreau - musée d'Art contemporain, Montsoreau, 2018
