= John Bowstead =

English artist (1940–2020)

John Bowstead (27 September 1940 – 12 April 2020) was an English artist and lyricist.

In 1962 Bowstead exhibited at the Institute of Contemporary Arts (ICA), as part of the exhibition Four Young Artists alongside David Hockney, Maurice Agis and Peter Phillips. In 1963 he was one of three artists to receive an "Honourable Mention" in the John Moores Prize. The same year, with fellow Slade painters Terry Atkinson, Roger Jeffs, and Bernard Jennings, he formed the art group "Fine Artz". From 1965 he was part of the Light/Sound Workshop at Hornsey College of Art until its demise in 1968.

He co-authored, with Jeffs, The Archigram magazine (1961–1974). In the magazine he self-advertised a 'John Bowstead and Friends' multi-media event for the Gulbenkian Theatre at the University of Kent. In 1970 he wrote the lyrics for a musical called "Oh Flux!" with Allan Clarke (lead singer of The Hollies) which also played at the Gulbenkian Theatre.
