= Christine Kozlov =

American artist (1945–2005)

- Born: Christine Kozlov; 1945; New York City, United States
- Died: 2005 (aged 59–60); London, United Kingdom
- Education: School of Visual Arts, New York City
- Known for: Conceptual art

Christine Kozlov (1945, New York City – 2005, London) was an American conceptual artist.

== Career ==
She attended the School of Visual Arts in NYC until 1967.

== Work ==
Kozlov was a figure in the New York Conceptual art scene centering around the Lannis Gallery located at 315 E 12th St near 2nd Ave in New York's East Village. She participated in a number of exhibitions in the sixties and early 1970s, subsequently falling away from the art world.

Her first pieces responded to questions of sound, memory and information. "Information, No Theory" consisted of a reel-to-reel recorder with an infinite tape loop and a microphone recording ambient noise from the room. It would record and then erase the traces of what was just recorded. It was recently restaged.

She and Joseph Kosuth started the Museum of Normal Art out of the Lannis Gallery. For a short time it featured many of the artists associated with Conceptualism. She was a member of the Art and Language Group from 1971 to 1976. She married Mayo Thompson in the late 1970s. They later divorced.

== Exhibitions ==
- Non-Anthropomorphic Art by Four Young Artists 1967
- She was the only woman participant in Fifteen People Present Their Favorite Book, a show mounted at Lannis Gallery, New York, in 1967, curated by Joseph Kosuth who assembled fellow artists Robert Morris, Ad Reinhardt, Sol LeWitt, Robert Mangold, Dan Graham, Robert Smithson, Carl Andre, Robert Ryman, among others.
- She was a participant in Lucy Lippard's Numbers" Shows 557,087« and »955,000« and also her Twenty-Six Contemporary Women Artists. She was in Information at the Museum of Modern Art, 1970. The Information exhibition was curated by Kynaston McShine and signaled the birth of Information art and helped to further establish the credibility of conceptual art.
- Twenty Six Contemporary Women Artists Lucy Lippard, The Aldrich Museum of Contemporary Art, 1971
- Arte de Sistemas, Museo De Arte Moderno / CAYC - Centro de Arte y Comunicación, Buenos Aires, 1971
- Reconsidering the Object of Art: 1965-1975, The Museum of Contemporary Art, Los Angeles, 1995
- Short Careers, Museum Moderner Kunst Stiftung Ludwig, Vienna, 2004
