= Art-Language =

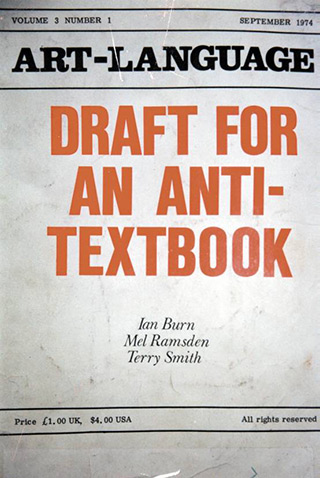
- Editor: Charles Harrison, Joseph Kosuth.
- Categories: Art
- Frequency: Triannually
- Publisher: Art & Language Press
- First issue: 1969
- Final issue: 1985
- Country: United Kingdom
- ISSN: 0587-3584
- OCLC: 2243756

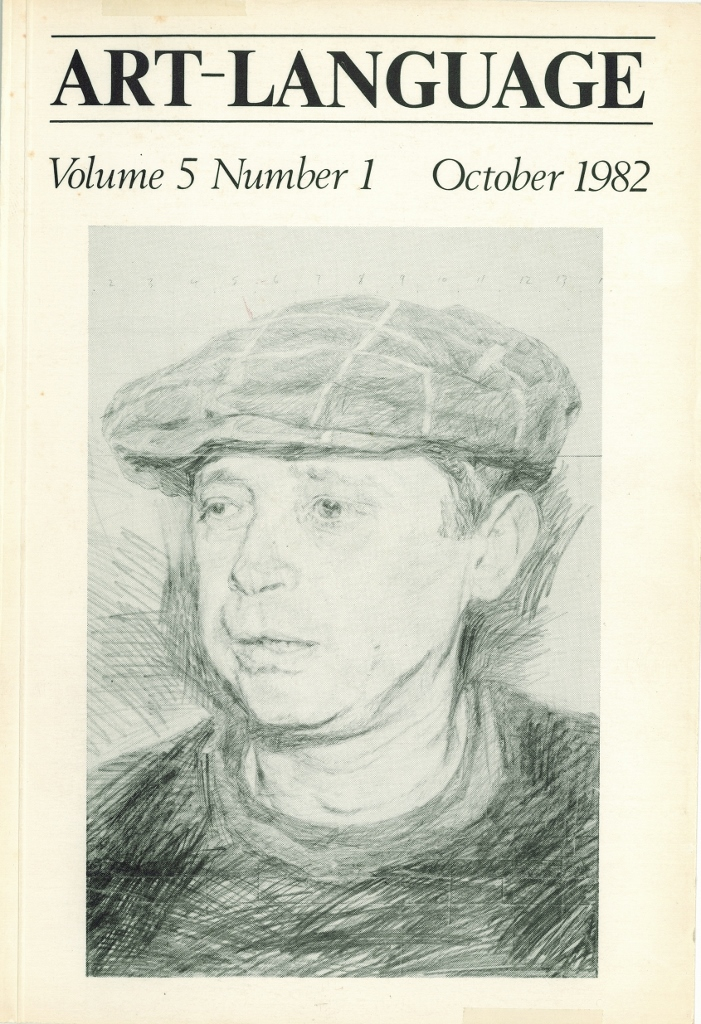
Cover of Art-Language Volume 5 Number 1 by Art & Language showing a drawing of Mel Ramsden

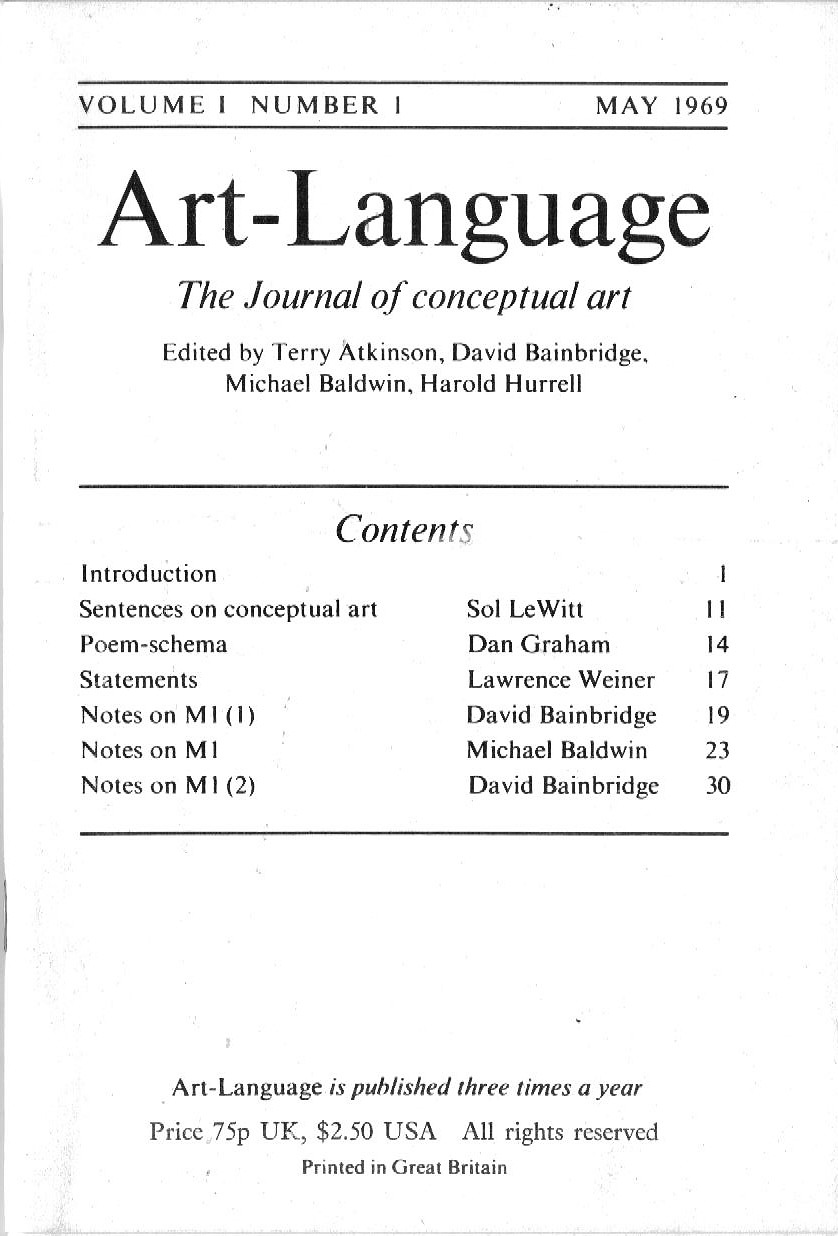
Cover of Art-Language the journal of conceptual art by Art & Language with texts by Michael Baldwin, Sol LeWitt, Dan Graham, Lawrence Weiner, and David Bainbridge

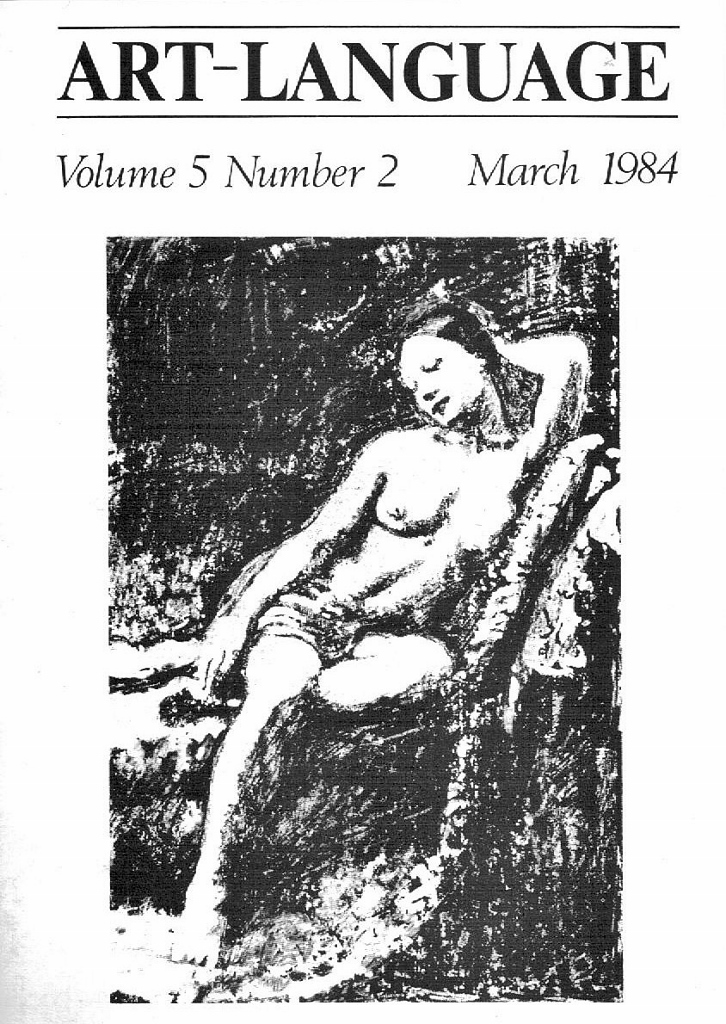
Cover of Art-Language Volume 5 Number 2 by Art & Language showing a drawing of Victorine Meurent

Art-Language: The Journal of Conceptual Art (1969-1985) was a magazine published by the conceptual artists of Art & Language. Involving more than 20 artists in the United States, Europe, and Australia, and covering almost 20 years production, it is one of the most extensive artworks of conceptual art and is regarded as an important influence on both conceptual art and contemporary art.

I don't understand quite a good deal of what is said by Art-Language, but I admire the investigatory energies, the tireless spade-work (not calling one one), the full commitment to the reestablishment of a valid language by which to discuss art and the occasional humour in their writings. The chaos in their reasons fascinates me, but it is also irritating to be unequipped to evaluate their work. - Six Years: The Dematerialization of the Art Object, Lucy R. Lippard, 1973.

== Background ==
The name Art & Language is derived from the journal Art-Language that was published by Art & Language Press. Art & Language Press had been created in 1968 to give a publication arm to the ongoing conversation between the four founders of Art & Language, (Michael Baldwin, Terry Atkinson, David Bainbridge, Harold Hurrell), and also between Art & Language and other artists in America or other parts of the world. Strong connections have been made over time between the British artists of Art & Language and American artists, in 1966, Michael Baldwin who has just been rewarded a Prize from the Northern Young Contemporaries, spent the money on a trip to New York, to meet and discuss with Donald Judd, Roy Lichtenstein, and Robert Morris. In November 1967, thanks to Robert Smithson, arts magazine, a New York-based magazine, published for the first time a text-work of Art & Language (before the foundation of the group) titled Remarks on Air-Conditioning, an Extravaganza of Blandness written by Michael Baldwin. It is interesting to note Michael Baldwin is presented as an English writer and an artist concerned with the non-exhibition. In 1969, Art Press, was produced in New York by Ian Burn and Mel Ramsden. In it they published their own text-works as well as items by Adrian Piper, Sol LeWitt and Stephen Kaltenbach or independent works of them like the opera Victorine.

== History ==
Art-Language: The Journal of Conceptual Art was published by Art & Language Press, it is regarded as an important influence on both conceptual art and contemporary art. Art & Language Press was founded at the same time as an art practice under the name Art & Language in 1968 by four artists, Michael Baldwin, Terry Atkinson, Harold Hurrell, and David Bainbridge. They were also the editors of the first volume published in May 1969.

Terry Atkinson spent the summer of 1969 with Joseph Kosuth in New York City, and in August of that year, Kosuth became the American editor of Art-Language. From the second volume, the journal was edited both in the United Kingdom and in the United States, Essays by members of Art & Language appeared regularly in Studio International, and in February 1970, the general editor and art critic Charles Harrison published an article titled Notes Towards Art Work, arguing that ″The only alternative to criticism is art″. In 1971, having resigned from Studio International, he became the general editor of Art-Language. In 1971, Terry Atkinson had also met Ian Burn and Mel Ramsden in New York in 1969 and, having published a number of text-works as the Society for Theoretical Art and Analyses, they joined with Art-Language that year. At the same time in Coventry, David Rushton, Philip Pilkington and Graham Howard, three Art Theory students of Baldwin, Bainbridge and Atkinson began to work under the name of Art & Language. In that year Coventry College of Art was transformed into the Faculty of Art and Design, part of Lanchester Polytechnic. The new dean of the faculty, saw it as his task to bring an end to the Art-Theory course.

In the summer of 1971, the Art-Theory course was dismantled by arbitrary exercise of power and Baldwin and Bainbridge dismissed along with some other members of the part-time staff. Atkinson remained. His presence enabled the authorities in charge to claim some credibility for the ruins ... Art & Language found itself in exile from any official academic or educational context … Art & Language work in all its forms was addressed first and foremost to ‘art’ as discourse, rather than to the enlargement of the extensive category of art objects -

Michael Baldwin and Terry Atkinson wrote an extensive 25 pages critical essay on Art education in an article titled "Art Teaching" and published it in Art-Language Volume 1 Number 4. In 1973, Atkinson eventually resigned.

In virtue of this prototype of present art-school sensibility, William Morris and his followers have helped spawn the resolute craftsmanship bias in British art education in the earlier part of the century. Of course this is not to say that Morris' influence stopped at Lowestoft and the Wash; the Bauhaus founders had a good look at Morris -and there may yet be a case for looking at the Bauhaus as the definitive example in showing how ″fine art″ and ″design″ do diverge.

While, in 1972, the activity of Art & Language was exclusively textual and its identity somehow confounded with Art-Language, the production of the Index 01, for the Documenta 5, under the name of The Art & Language Institute marked a shift. From Art-Language Volume 2 Number 3, the journal became anonymous and the authorship of the texts weren't given anymore to individuals. The journal continued to be published until 1985, and the implications of the indexes of 1972-3 persisted in bearing in various ways – and to a greater and lesser extent upon its content.

A new series appeared in 1994, continuing for three issues until 1999. Apart from Baldwin, Ramsden and Harrison, into whose hands the work of Art & Language had been taken by 1976, its contributors included Philip Pilkington and Paul Wood.

=== Editors ===
The first number was edited by Art & Language, Joseph Kosuth became the American editor from August 1969 until 1972, and Art & Language remained the English editors. In 1971, art historian Charles Harrison became the general editor of Art-Language, and he remained so until the last volume.

== Contents ==
Given the desire for anonymity attached to the members of the group, it is difficult to know who did what in Art & Language. Nevertheless, the authors of the articles are named in the first seven issues of the magazine, and from 1974, all texts are collectively attributed to Art & Language. But, since during the internal problems that the group encountered between 1975 and 1976, the name Art & Language remained in the hands of Michael Baldwin, Mel Ramsden and Charles Harrison, it is logical to give them the authorship of the texts from Volume 3 Number 4.

== Critical review ==
- Daniel Buren:
  To lend support to their pseudo-cultural references and to their bluffing games, with a complacent display of questionable scholarship, certain artists attempt to explain what conceptual art would be, could be or should be -thus making a conceptual work. There is no lack of vulgarity in pretense. In place of unpretentious inquiry we are subjected to a hodgepodge of explanations and justifications which serve as obfuscation in the attempt to convince us of the existence of thought. For these, conceptual art has become verbiage art. They are no longer living in the twentieth century but wish to revive the eighteenth.
- Jeff Wall:
  By putting forward its forgotten card-files and print-outs (its caskets of information) conceptualism recapitulates a kind of Mallarméan aesthetic: social subjects are presented as enigmatic hieroglyphs and given the authority of the crypt. The identification of bureaucracy, publicity and academicism with cryptic utterances expresses an awareness of the participation of universities and bureaucracies in a corporate death-machine, an awareness which of course animated the student movement. - Jeff Wall, 1981.
- Lucy Lippard:
  I don't understand quite a good deal of what is said by Art-Language, but I admire the investigatory energies, the tireless spade-work (not calling one one), the full commitment to the reestablishment of a valid language by which to discuss art and the occasional humour in their writings. The chaos in their reasons fascinates me, but it is also irritating to be unequipped to evaluate their work. I don't know how it is or if it is evaluated by adepts in philosophy as philosophy, but I find it infuriating to have to take them on faith. - Six Years: The Dematerialization of the Art Object, Lucy R. Lippard, 1973.
