= Art & Language =

English conceptual artists' collaboration

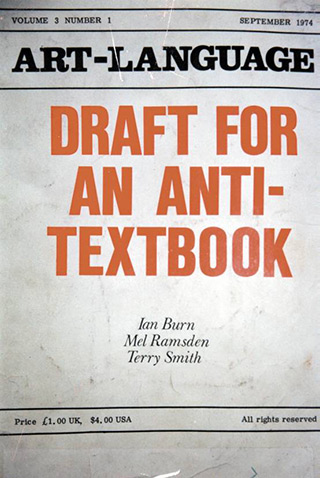
Scratched photograph of the cover of Art-Language, Vol.3 No.1, 1974.

Art & Language is an English conceptual artists' collaboration created around 1967. The name Art & Language is derived from the journal Art-Language (first published in Coventry in May 1969), which had its origins in the work of Terry Atkinson and Michael Baldwin (from 1966) in association with Harold Hurrell and David Bainbridge. These were its original editors. Art & Language was used subsequently to identify the joint and several artistic works of these four in an effort to reflect the conversational basis of their activity, which, by late 1969, had already included contributions from New York by Joseph Kosuth, Ian Burn and Mel Ramsden. By late 1976 "the genealogical thread of this artistic work had been taken into the hands of Michael Baldwin and Mel Ramsden, with whom it remains." The facts of who did what, how much they contributed and so on are more or less well known. The (small) degree of anonymity that the name originally conferred continues, however, to be of historical significance.

== Founding and History ==
In 1968, Terry Atkinson, David Bainbridge, Michael Baldwin and Harold Hurrell started Art & Language in Coventry. The four had collaborated in various iterations since 1964, but the foundation of Art & Language marked a more formal approach to collaboration.^{,40;}^{:18}

For the members of Art & Language, the "'execution' of texts was primary rather than 'perfunctory'"^{:5} As such, one of their primary points of production was the journal Art-Language.^{,}

=== Art-Language Press and Journal ===
In 1968 they founded Art-Language Press, based in Chipping Norton, which published the journal Art-Language. Volume 1, subtitled The Journal of Conceptual Art was published in May 1969. The journal focused on "analyzing 'the language-use of the art society'" and quickly was at the "vanguard of conceptualism".

Issue 1 was heavily influenced by a trip Atkinson had taken to the United States and heavily featured American artists. By the second issue (Volume 1, Number 2, February 1970), "‘the collective quickly realised that its understanding of conceptual art was not compatible with what these American artists were doing" and dropped the journal's subtitle.^{,41}

Art-Language was the first imprint to identify a public entity called ‘Conceptual Art’, and the first to serve the theoretical and conversational interests of a community of artists and critics who were its producers and users.

For the artists involved in Arts & Language, "conversation and discussion became their primary practice or media rather than professional or social aspects distinct from the work."^{,42} Additionally, there was a strong relationship to pedagogy; as member Charles Harrison has stated, the "need to sort out what was teachable in respect of art became practically indistinguishable within A & L from the project of theorising art itself."^{,42}

==== Expansion ====
As the distribution of the journal and the teaching practice of the editors and others developed, the conversation expanded and multiplied. In August 1969, Joseph Kosuth joined as the journal's American Editor and Charles Harrison joined as the General Editor in 1971.^{:58}

By 1971 the group had expanded to include Philip Pilkington, David Rushton, Lynn Lemaster, Sandra Harrison, Graham Howard and Paul Wood, and (in New York) Michael Corris, and later Paula Ramsden, Terry Smith, Mayo Thompson, Christine Kozlov, Preston Heller, Andrew Menard and Kathryn Bigelow.

=== Dissolution ===
Decisive action had become necessary if any vestige of Art & Language’s original ethos was to remain. There were those who saw themselves excluded from this who departed for individual occupations in teaching or as artists. There were others immune to the troubles who simply found different work. Terry Atkinson had left in 1974. There were yet others whose departure was expedited by those whose practice had continued (and continues) to be identified with the journal Art-Language and its artistic commitments. While musical activities continued (and continue) with Mayo Thompson, and the literary conversational project continued with Charles Harrison (died 2008).

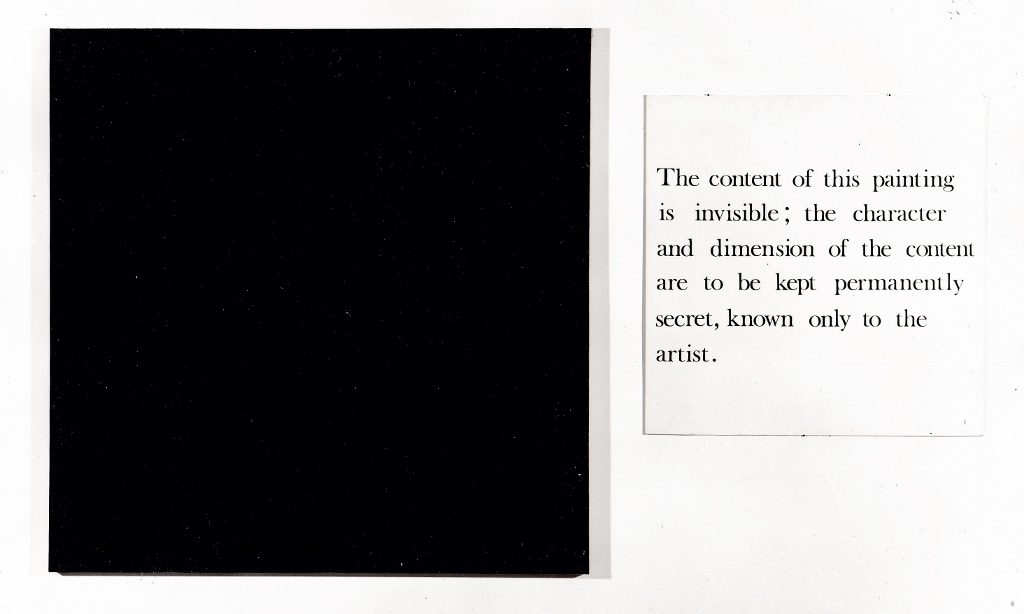
Secret Painting Art & Language (Mel Ramsden), 1967

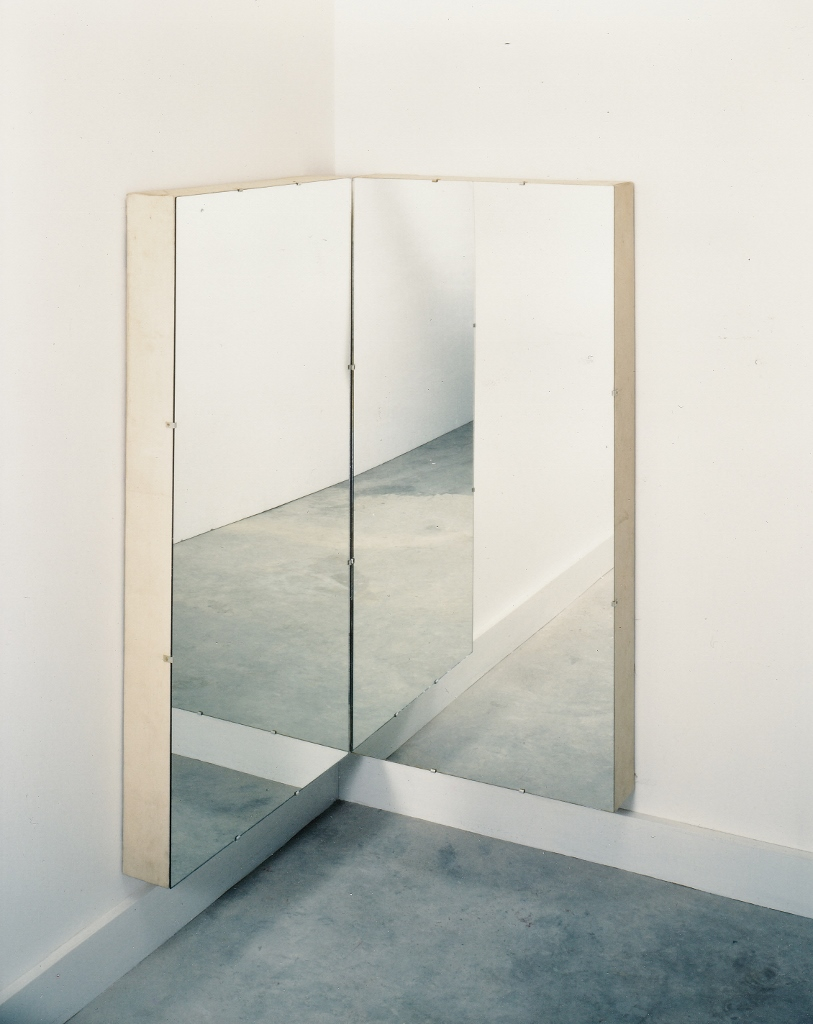
Mirror Piece, 1965

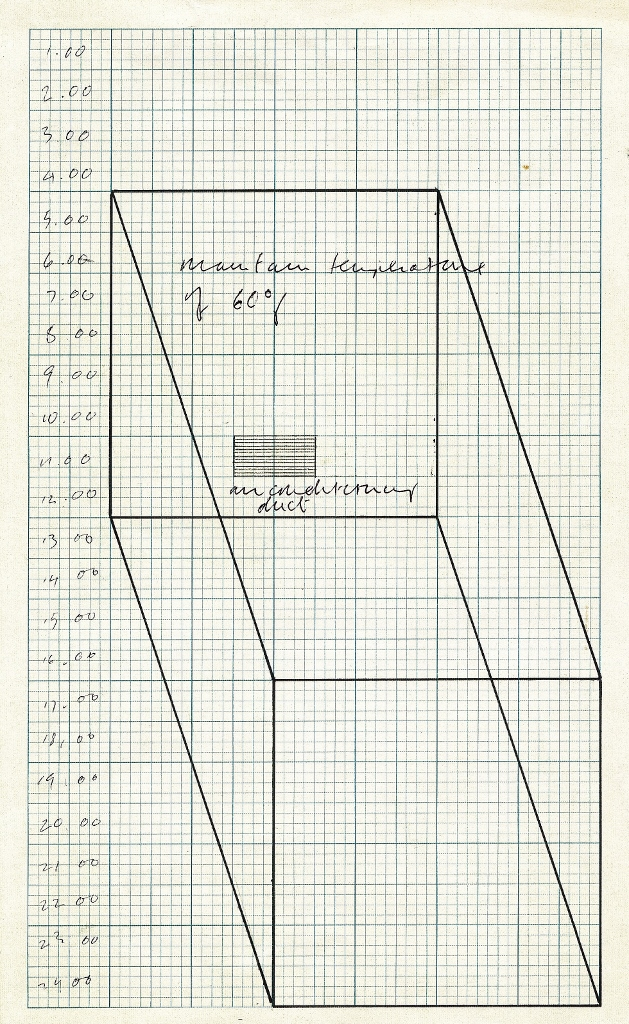
Air conditioning show 1966-7

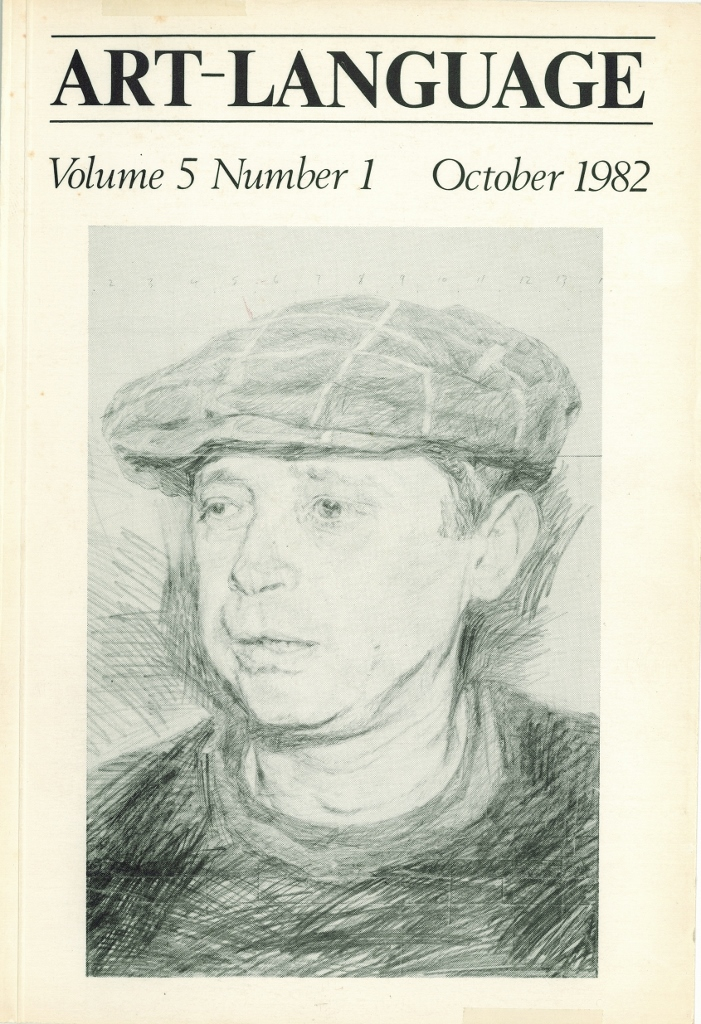
Cover of volume 5 number 1 of Art-Language, reproducing a self-portrait of Mel Ramsden

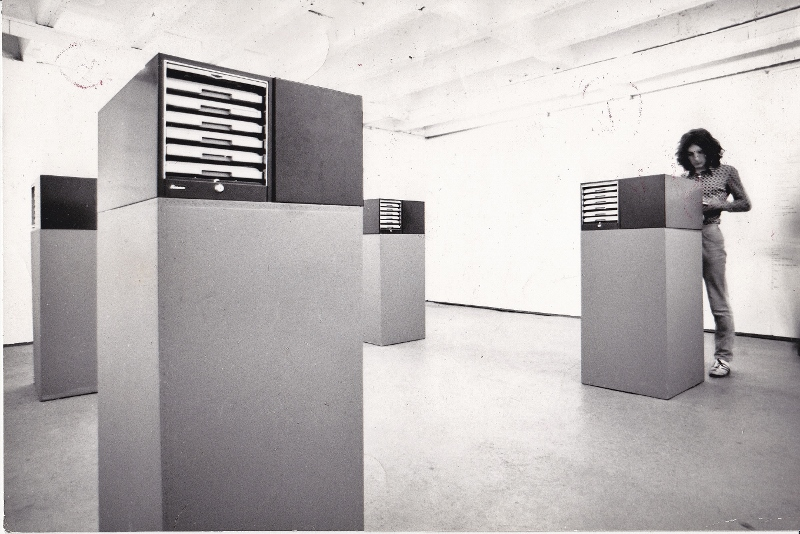
Art & language documenta 5 index 01

== Members and associates ==
Members and associates include Terry Atkinson, David Bainbridge, Michael Baldwin, Kathryn Bigelow, Ian Burn, Sarah Charlesworth,Charles Harrison, Michael Corris,Preston Heller, Graham Howard, Harold Hurrell,Joseph Kosuth, Christine Kozlov, Nigel Lendon, Andrew Menard, Philip Pilkington, Neil Powell, Mel Ramsden, David Rushton, Terry Smith, and Mayo Thompson and Red Crayola.

== Legacy ==
Celebrating 60 years of Art & Language, in 2025 Château de Montsoreau-Museum of Contemporary Art in Montsoreau France presented the group exhibition Art & Language: The Mirror Effect. The title refers to Michael Baldwin's Mirror Piece (1965). Exhibition curator, Lara Pan, described the exhibition as an examination of the relationships between artists and their art in light of the principles of Art & Language.

A catalogue raisonné will be published in the fall of 2025.

=== Public collections ===
- Art Gallery of New South Wales, Sydney, Australia.
- Arts Council of Great Britain, United Kingdom.
- Centre Georges Pompidou, Paris.
- Centro de Arte Contemporàneo de Malaga, Malaga, Spain.
- Château de Montsoreau-Museum of Contemporary Art, Montsoreau, France.
- FRAC Haute Normandie, Sotteville-lès-Rouen, France.
- FRAC Languedoc Roussillon, Montpellier, France.
- Les Abattoirs, Museum of Modern and Contemporary Art, Toulouse, France.
- Lille Métropole Museum of Modern, Contemporary and Outsider Art, Villeneuve d'Ascq, France.
- Barcelona Museum of Contemporary Art, Barcelona Spain.
- MAMCO, Museum of Modern and Contemporary Art, Geneva, Switzerland.]
- Migros Museum of Contemporary Art, Zurich, Switzerland.
- Musée d'art moderne, Saint-Priest-en-Jarez, France.
- Museum Moderner Kunst Stiftung, Vienna, Austria.
- Museum of Contemporary Art, Los Angeles, CA, USA.
- Museum of Modern Art, New York.
- National Gallery of Victoria, Melbourne, Australia.
- Stedelijk Museum voor Actuele Kunst, Ghent, Belgium.
- Tate Modern, London.
