= Coventry School of Art and Design =

Art school of Coventry University

- Type: Art School
- Established: 1843
- Affiliations: Coventry University
- Location: Coventry, England; 52.4070°N 1.5031°W
- Website: www.coventry.ac.uk/csad

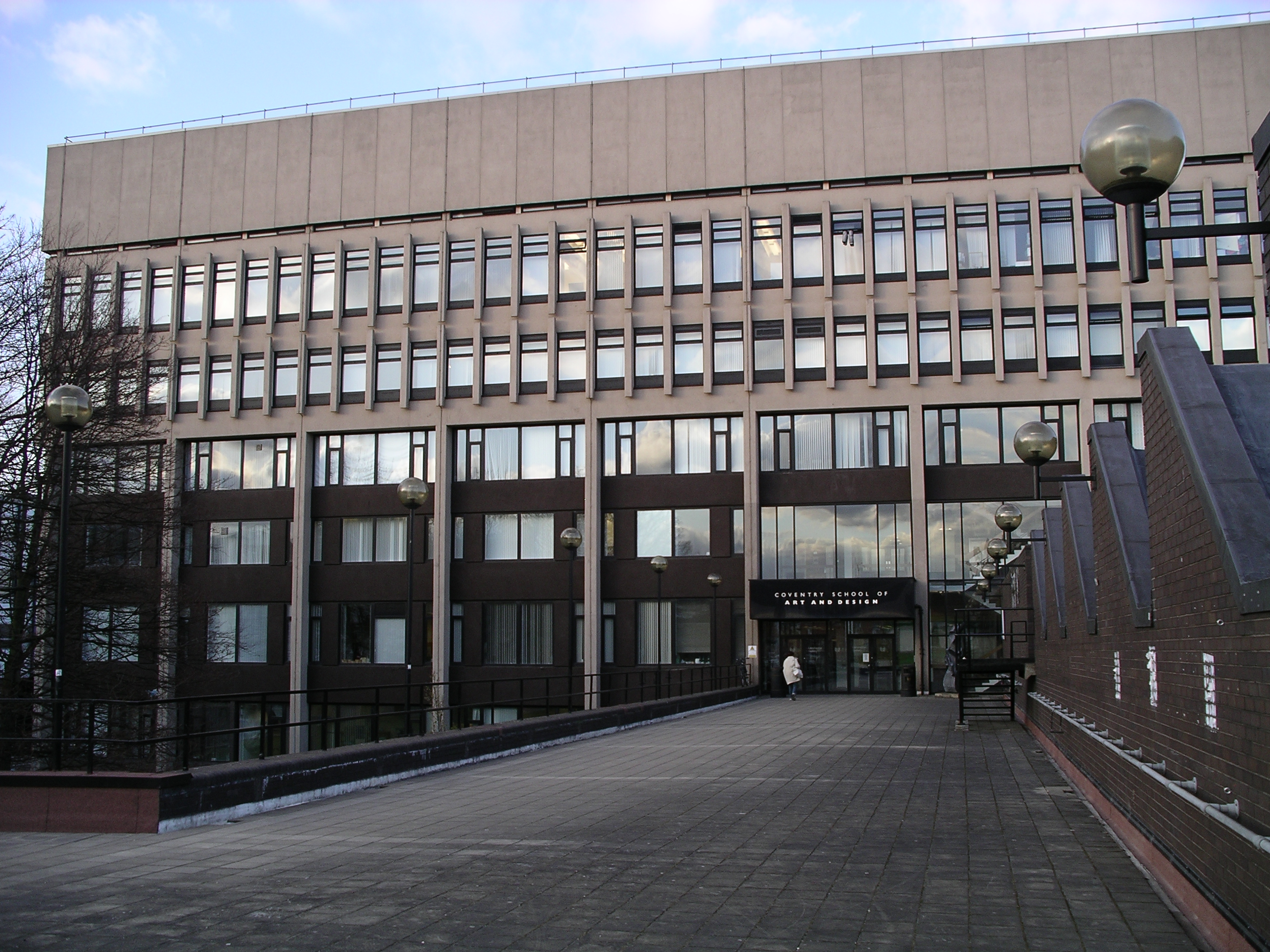
The Graham Sutherland Building

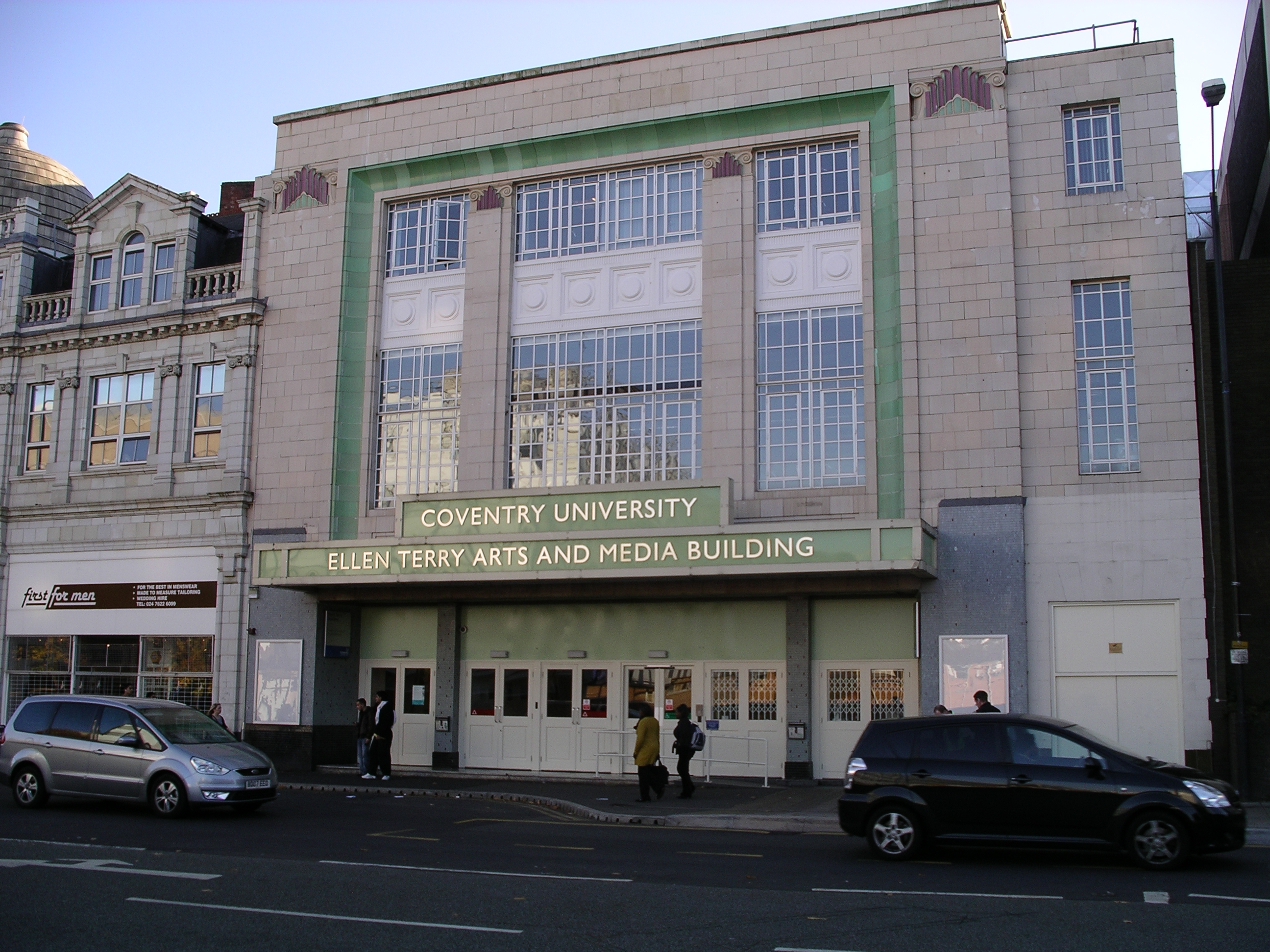
The Ellen Terry Arts and Media Building

Coventry School of Art and Design is part of Coventry University in Coventry, West Midlands in the UK. It is home to a number of departments that teach and research in the areas of art, media and design including the Department of Industrial Design, the Department of Media, the Department of Design and Visual Arts and the Department of Performing Arts. It is most known for its world-famous courses in Automotive Design. The school also includes the Lanchester Gallery and the Institute for Creative Enterprises (ICE).

== History ==
Coventry School of Art and Design's roots date back to the Coventry School of Design 1843. This became the Coventry School of Art in 1852, Coventry Municipal School of Art in 1902 and then Coventry College of Art in 1954. In 1970, it was merged with the Lanchester College of Technology and the Rugby College of Engineering to become part of the Lanchester Polytechnic, which later went on to become the Coventry Polytechnic in 1987 and Coventry University in 1992.

== Premises ==
- The Graham Sutherland Building, for courses in Design and Visual Arts and Industrial Design
- The Ellen Terry Arts and Media Building, for Courses in Media, Journalism and Performing Arts

== Courses ==
It has a range of courses in the following subject areas

- Advertising
- Art
- Automotive
- Fashion
- Graphic Design
- Journalism
- Media - including Media and Communications, Digital Media and Media Production
- Music
- Performing Arts
- Photography
- Product Design
