= Terry Atkinson =

English artist

- Born: 1939 (age 86–87); Thurnscoe, Yorkshire, England
- Known for: Conceptual art

Terry Atkinson (born 1939) is an English artist.

== Career ==
Atkinson was born in Thurnscoe, near Barnsley, Yorkshire. He lives in Leamington Spa, England with his wife, artist Sue Atkinson, with whom he has frequently collaborated. In 1967, he began to teach art at the Coventry School of Art while producing conceptual works, sometimes in collaboration with Michael Baldwin. In 1968 they, together with Harold Hurrell and David Bainbridge who also taught at Coventry, formed Art & Language, a group whose influence on other artists both in the UK and in the United States is widely acknowledged. Atkinson was founder-member (with colleagues John Bowstead, Roger Jeffs and Bernard Jennings) of the group Fine-Artz (1963), and (with David Bainbridge, Michael Baldwin and Harold Hurrell) of the group Art & Language (1968–74), two of the most influential collectives in contemporary Western art.

Atkinson stopped teaching at Coventry in 1973 and the following year left Art & Language. He has since exhibited under his own name, including at the 1984 Venice Biennale

== Recognition and representation in collections ==
In 1985 he was nominated for the Turner Prize and exhibited a series of paintings, including The Stone Touchers I. Atkinson's work is held in many collections, including the Tate Gallery.
