= Joseph Kosuth =

American conceptual artist

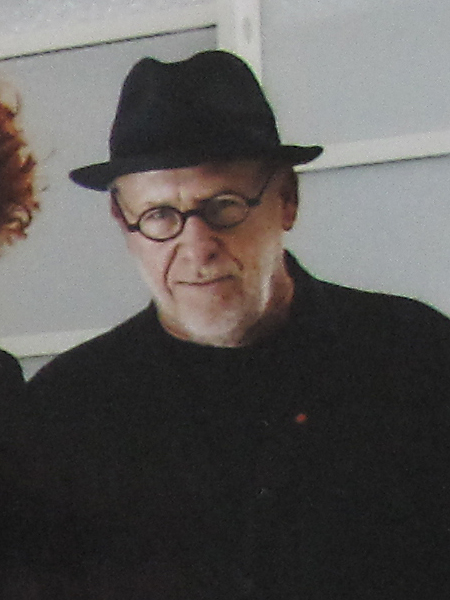
- Kosuth in 2014
- Born: January 31, 1945 (age 81); Toledo, Ohio, US
- Education: School of Visual Arts
- Known for: Conceptual art

Joseph Kosuth (/kəˈsuːθ/; born January 31, 1945) is an American conceptual artist, who lives in New York and Rome, after having resided in various cities in Europe, including London, Ghent, and Venice.

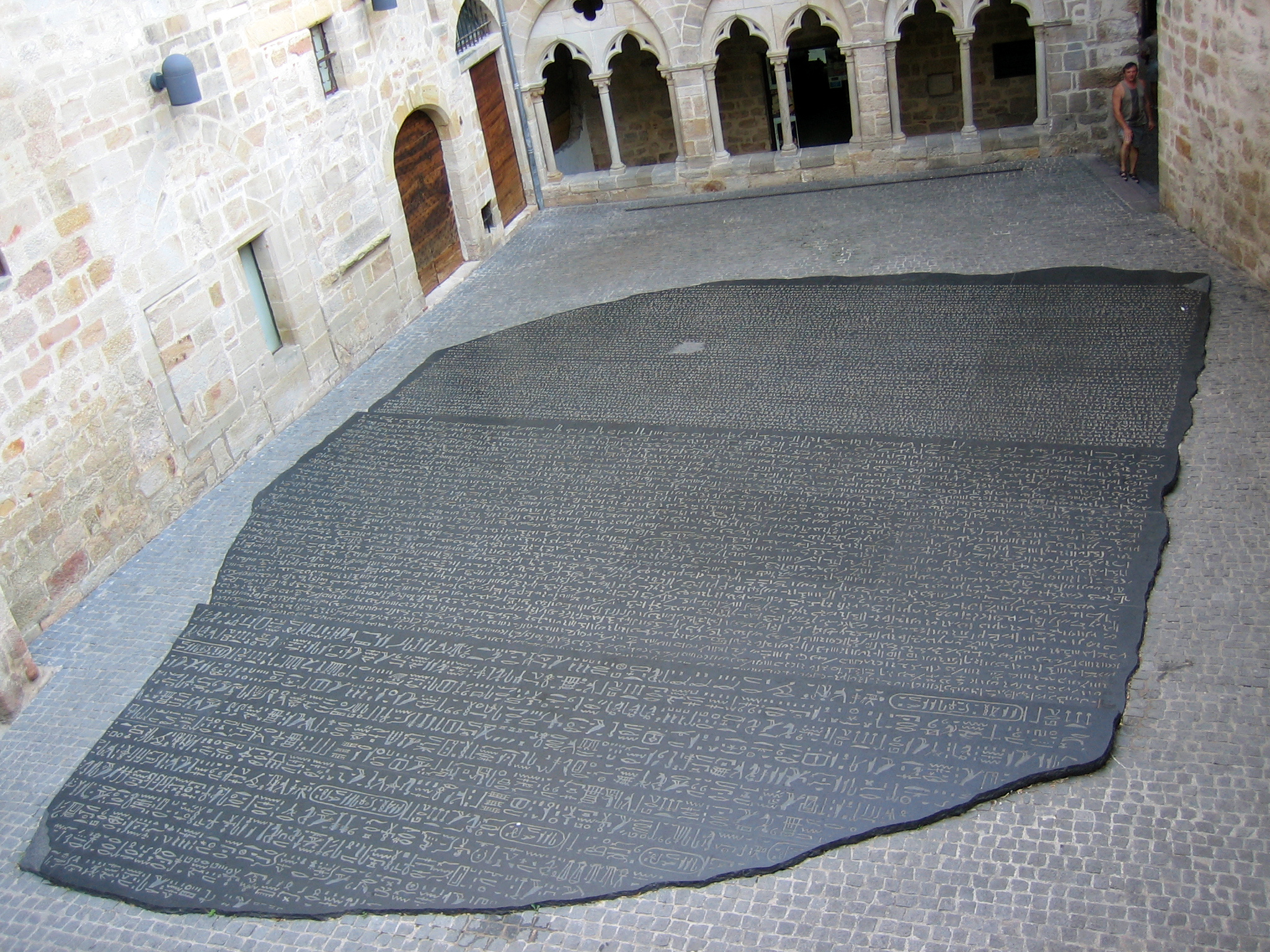
A giant copy of the Rosetta stone, by Joseph Kosuth in Figeac, France, the birthplace of Jean-François Champollion

== Early life and career ==
Born in Toledo, Ohio, Kosuth had an American mother and a Hungarian father from an old noble family. (A relative, Lajos Kossuth, led Hungary’s struggle for independence from Austria during the Hungarian Revolution of 1848.) Joseph Kosuth attended the Toledo Museum School of Design from 1955 to 1962 and studied privately under the Belgian painter Line Bloom Draper. In 1963 Kosuth enrolled at the Cleveland Institute of Art on a scholarship. He spent the following year in Paris and traveled throughout Europe and North Africa. He moved to New York in 1965 and attended the School of Visual Arts there until 1967. From 1971 he studied anthropology and philosophy with Stanley Diamond and Bob Scholte at the New School for Social Research, New York.

At the School of Visual Arts he made a significant impact while technically a student, influencing fellow students as well as more traditional teachers. As Kosuth's reputation grew, he was removed from the student body and given a position as a teacher, by Silas Rhodes the founder and President of the school, in 1967. This caused a near revolt of the faculty, as he had been a disruptive presence in the opinion of many of the instructors, several who had unhappily faced his questioning of basic presumptions. His elevation to a teacher was also a result of Kosuth's outside activities, which included the co-founding of the Museum of Normal Art (giving the first exposure to artists such as Robert Ryman, On Kawara, Hanne Darboven, among others) along with proselytizing and organizing artists in a direction which was later identified as the conceptual art movement. Through his art, writing and organizing, he emphasized his interest in the dialectical process of idea formation in relation to language and context. He introduced the notion that art, as he put it, "was not a question of forms and colors but one of the production of meaning." His writing began a re-reading of modernism, initiating a major re-evaluation of the importance of Marcel Duchamp and signaling the shift into what we now identify, in art, as post-modernism. His analysis had a major impact on his practice as an artist and, soon after, on that of others. During this period he also maintained his academic interests. His position on the Faculty, Department of Fine Art, The School of Visual Arts, New York City continued until 1985. He since been Professor at the Hochschule für Bildende Künste, Hamburg, 1988–90; and at the State Academy of Fine Arts Stuttgart, 1991–1997. Currently he is professor at the Kunstakademie Munich and at the Istituto Universitario di Architettura, Faculty of Design and Art, in Venice. He has been invited as a visiting professor and guest lecturer at various universities and institutions for nearly thirty years, some of which include: Yale University; Cornell University; New York University; Duke University; UCLA; Cal Arts; Cooper Union; Pratt Institute; The Museum of Modern Art, New York; Art Institute of Chicago; Royal Academy, Copenhagen; Ashmoleon Museum, Oxford University; University of Rome; Berlin Kunstakademie; Royal College of Art, London; Glasgow School of Art; The Hayward Gallery, London; The Sorbonne, Paris; The Sigmund Freud Museum, Vienna.

Kosuth continued his work, writing, exhibiting and exhibition organizing and rapidly became acknowledged as one of the pioneers of Conceptual art and installation art; initiating language-based works as well as photo-based works and appropriation strategies since the beginning of his work in the mid-1960s. His activity has consistently explored the production and role of language and meaning within art. Kosuth's nearly thirty-five year inquiry into the relation of language to art has taken the form of installations, museum exhibitions, public commissions and publications throughout Europe, the Americas and the Far East, including five Documenta(s) and four Venice Biennale(s). His earliest work, the Protoinvestigations, were done when he was only twenty years old and as they are considered among the first works of the Conceptual art movement they are included in collections such as The Museum of Modern Art, The Guggenheim, The Whitney, Centre Pompidou, The Tate Gallery, The Reina Sophia, Madrid, among many others, and constitute a youthful record in most of these major collections. Joseph Kosuth's career includes over 170 one-person exhibitions in museums and galleries around the world, twenty-two of them by the time he was twenty-five years old.

In 1989 Kosuth, along with Peter Pakesch, founded The Foundation for the Arts as part of The Sigmund Freud Museum, Vienna. He is the President of the foundation. The foundation was established on the 50th anniversary of Sigmund Freud's death, and is a society of artists engaged, through contributions by members, in forming a collection of contemporary art in honor of and in relevance to Sigmund Freud. The foundation's exhibition space is in the former offices of Anna Freud at the Sigmund Freud Museum, Vienna.

== Work ==
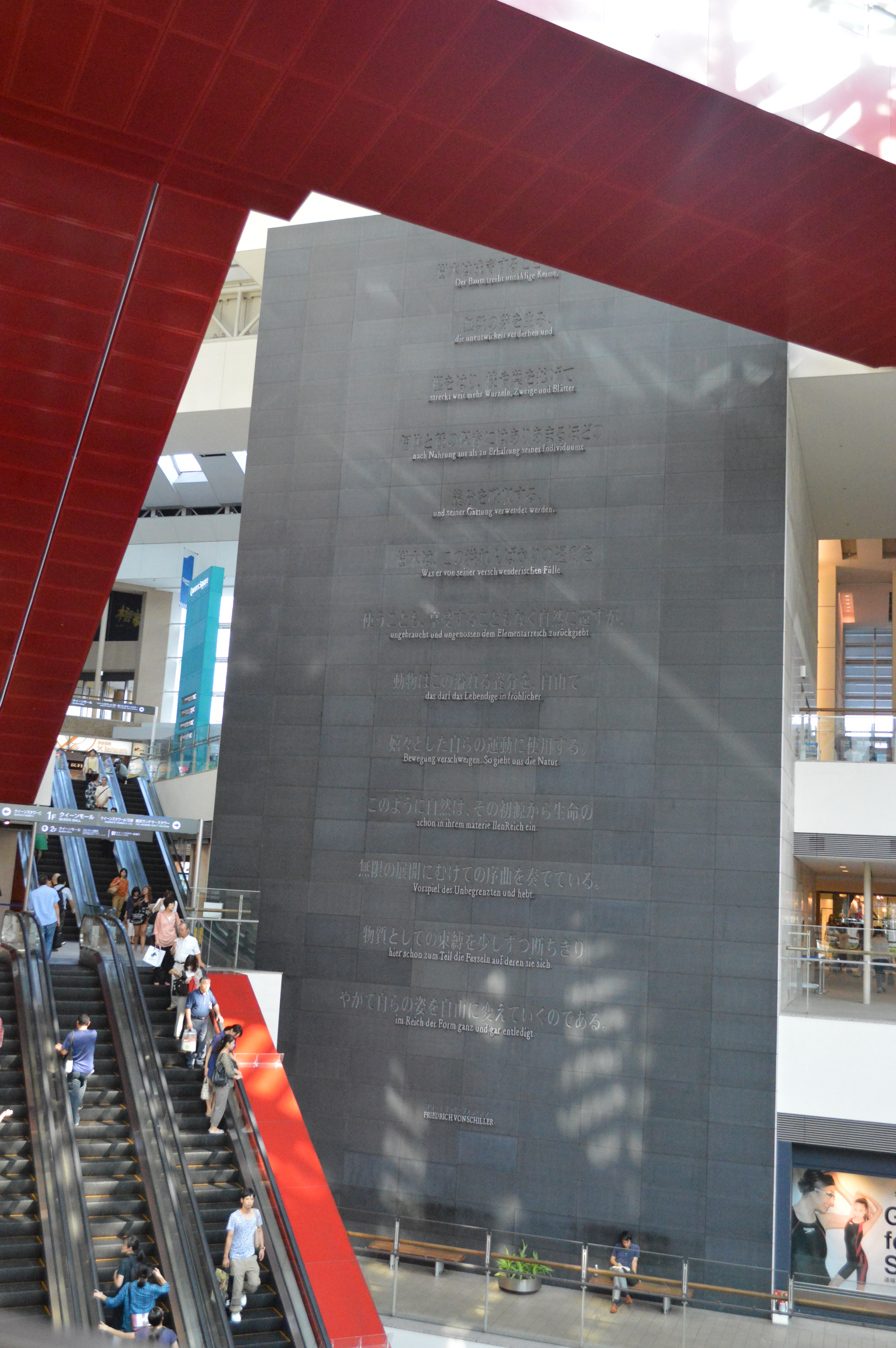
Kosuth's "The Boundaries of the Limitless" in Queen's Square YOKOHAMA, Japan, 1997

Kosuth belongs to a broadly international generation of conceptual artists that began to emerge in the mid-1960s, stripping art of personal emotion, reducing it to nearly pure information or idea and greatly playing down the art object. Along with Lawrence Weiner, On Kawara, Hanne Darboven and others, Kosuth gives special prominence to language. His art generally strives to explore the nature of art rather than producing what is traditionally called "art". Kosuth's works are frequently self-referential. He remarked in 1969:

"The 'value' of particular artists after Duchamp can be weighed according to how much they questioned the nature of art."

Kosuth's works frequently reference Sigmund Freud's psycho-analysis and Ludwig Wittgenstein's philosophy of language.

His first conceptual work Leaning Glass, consisted of an object, a photograph of it and dictionary definitions of the words denoting it. In 1966 Kosuth also embarked upon a series of works entitled Art as Idea as Idea, involving texts, through which he probed the condition of art. The works in this series took the form of photostat reproductions of dictionary definitions of words such as "water", "meaning", and "idea". Accompanying these photographic images are certificates of documentation and ownership (not for display) indicating that the works can be made and remade for exhibition purposes.

One of his most famous works is One and Three Chairs. The piece features a physical chair, a photograph of that chair, and the text of a dictionary definition of the word "chair". The photograph is a representation of the actual chair situated on the floor, in the foreground of the work. The definition, posted on the same wall as the photograph, delineates in words the concept of what a chair is, in its various incarnations. In this and other, similar works, Four Colors Four Words and Glass One and Three, Kosuth forwards tautological statements, where the works literally are what they say they are. A collaboration with independent filmmaker Marion Cajori, Sept. 11, 1972 was a Minimalist portrait of sunlight in Cajori's studio.

His seminal text Art after Philosophy, written in 1968–69, had a major impact on the thinking about art at the time and has been seen since as a kind of "manifesto" of Conceptual art insofar as it provided the only theoretical framework for the practice at the time. (As a result, it has since been translated into 14 languages, and included in a score of anthologies.) It was, for the twenty-four year old Kosuth that wrote it, in fact more of a "agitprop" attack on Greenbergian formalism, what Kosuth saw as the last bastion of late, institutionalized modernism more than anything else. It also for him concluded at the time what he had learned from Wittgenstein - dosed with Walter Benjamin among others - as applied to that very transitional moment in art.

In the early 1970s, concerned with his "ethnocentricity as a white, male artist", Kosuth enrolled in the New School to study anthropology. He visited the Trobriand Islands in the South Pacific (made famous in studies by the anthropologist Bronislaw Malinowski), and the Huallaga Indians in the Peruvian Amazon.

For Kosuth, his studies in cultural anthropology were a logical outgrowth that followed from his interest in the "anthropological" dimension of the later Wittgenstein. Indeed, it was the later Wittgenstein of the Investigation - which by accident he had read first - that led to works such as One and Three Chairs (among other influences), not the Tractatus as is often assumed. His anthropological "field work" was organized by him only for the purpose of informing his practice as an artist. (As he said to friends at the time: "some artists learn how to weld, others go back to school.") By the early 1970s, he had an internationally recognized career and was in his late 20s. He found that he was, as he put it, "a Eurocentric, white, male artist", and was increasingly culturally and politically uncomfortable with all that seemed naturally acceptable to his location. His study of cultural anthropology (and it was the New School perspective of Vico, Rousseau, Marx that provided him a direction out of the Ango-American philosophical context) led him to decide to spend time within other cultures, deeply embedded in other world views. He spent time in the Peruvian Amazon with the Yagua Indians living deep into the Peruvian side of the Amazon basin. He also lived in an area of Australia some hundreds of kilometers north of Alice Springs with an Aboriginal tribe that, before they were re-located four years previously from an area farther north, had not known of the existence of white people. Later, he spent time in the Trobriand islands with the Aboriginal tribe that Malinowski had studied and wrote on. From Kosuth's point of view, "I knew I could, would, never enter into their cultural reality, but I wanted to experience the edge of my own." It was this experience and study which lead to his well-known text The Artist as Anthropologist in 1975.

Hung on walls, his signature dark gray, Kosuth's later, large photomontages trace a kind of artistic and intellectual autobiography. Each consists of a photograph of one of the artist's own older works or installations, overlaid in top and bottom corners by two passages of philosophical prose quoted from intellectuals identified only by initials (they include Jacques Derrida, Martin Buber and Julia Kristeva).

=== Collaborations ===
In 1992, Kosuth designed the album cover for Fragments of a Rainy Season by John Cale.

Two years later, Kosuth collaborated with Ilya Kabakov to produce The Corridor of Two Banalities, shown at the Centre for Contemporary Art in Warsaw. This installation included 120 tables in a row to present text somewhat symptomatic of the cultures of which they both came from.

=== Commissions ===
Since 1990 Kosuth has also begun working on various permanent public commissions. In the early 1990s, he designed a Government-sponsored monument to the Egyptologist Jean Francois Champollion who deciphered the Rosetta Stone in Figeac; in Japan, he took on the curatorship of a show celebrating the Tokyo opening of Barneys New York; and in Frankfurt, Germany, and in Columbus, Ohio, he conceived neon monuments to the German cultural historian Walter Benjamin. In 1994, for the city of Tachikawa, Kosuth designed Words of a Spell, for Noëma, a 136-foot-long mural composed of quotes from Michiko Ishimure and James Joyce.

After projects at public buildings such as the Deutsche Bundesbank (1997), the Parliament House, Stockholm (1998), and the Parliament of the Brussels-Capital Region (1999), Kosuth was commissioned to propose a work for the newly renovated Bundestag in 2001, he designed a floor installation with texts by Ricarda Huch and Thomas Mann for the Paul Löbe Haus. In 2003, he created three installations in the Isabella Stewart Gardner Museum in Boston, employing text, archival material, and objects from the museum's collection to comment on the politics and philosophy behind museum collections. In 2009, Kosuth's exhibition entitled ni apparence ni illusion (Neither Appearance Nor Illusion), an installation work throughout the 12th century walls of the Louvre Palace, opened at the Musée du Louvre in Paris and became a permanent work in October 2012. In 2011, celebrating the work of Charles Darwin, Kosuth created a commission in the library where Darwin was inspired to pursue his evolutionary theory. His work on the façade of the Council of State of the Netherlands will be inaugurated in October 2011 and he is currently working on a permanent work for the four towers of the façade of the Bibliothèque nationale de France in Paris, expected to be completed in 2012.

=== Lecturer ===
Kosuth has taught widely, as a guest lecturer and as a member of faculties at the School of Visual Arts, New York City (1967–85); Hochschule für bildende Künste Hamburg (1988–90); State Academy of Fine Arts Stuttgart (1991–97); and the Academy of Fine Arts, Munich (2001–06). Currently Professor at Istituto Universitario di Architettura, Venice, Kosuth has functioned as visiting professor and guest lecturer at various universities and institutions for nearly forty years, some of which include: Yale University; Cornell University: New York University; Duke University; UCLA; Cal Arts; Cooper Union; Pratt Institute; The Museum of Modern Art, New York, Art Institute of Chicago, Royal Academy, Copenhagen; Ashmolean Museum, Oxford University; University of Rome, Berlin Kunstakademie; Royal College of Art, London; Glasgow School of Art; Hayward Gallery, London; Sorbonne, Paris; and the Sigmund Freud Museum, Vienna. His students have included, among others, Michel Majerus.

=== Writings ===
Kosuth became the American editor of the Art & Language journal in 1969. He later was coeditor of The Fox magazine in 1975–76 and art editor of Marxist Perspectives in 1977–78. In addition, he has written several books on the nature of art and artists, including Artist as Anthropologist. In his essay "Art after Philosophy" (1969), he argued that art is the continuation of philosophy, which he saw at an end. He was unable to define art in so far as such a definition would destroy his private self-referential definition of art. Like the Situationists, he rejected formalism as an exercise in aesthetics, with its function to be aesthetic. Formalism, he said, limits the possibilities for art with minimal creative effort put forth by the formalist. Further, since concept is overlooked by the formalist, "Formalist criticism is no more than an analysis of the physical attributes of particular objects which happen to exist in a morphological context". He further argues that the "change from 'appearance' to 'conception' (which begins with Duchamp's first unassisted readymade) was the beginning of 'modern art' and the beginning of 'conceptual art'." Kosuth explains that works of conceptual art are analytic propositions. They are linguistic in character because they express definitions of art. This makes them tautological. Art After Philosophy and After Collected Writings, 1966-1990 reveals between the lines a definition of "art" of which Joseph Kosuth meant to assure us. "Art is an analytical proposition of context, thought, and what we do that is intentionally designated by the artist by making the implicit nature of culture, of what happens to us, explicit - internalizing its 'explicitness' (making it again, 'implicit') and so on, for the purpose of understanding that is continually interacting and socio-historically located. These words, like actual works of art, are little more than historical curiosities, but the concept becomes a machine that makes the art beneficial, modest, rustic, contiguous, and humble."

== Exhibitions ==
In 1969 Kosuth held his first solo exhibition at Leo Castelli Gallery, New York. That same year, he organized an exhibition of his work, Fifteen Locations, which took place simultaneously at fifteen museums and galleries worldwide; he also participated in the seminal exhibition of Conceptual art at the Seth Siegelaub Gallery, New York. In 1973, the Kunstmuseum Luzern presented a major retrospective of his art that traveled in Europe. In 1981, the Staatsgalerie Stuttgart and the Kunsthalle Bielefeld organized another major Kosuth retrospective. He was invited to exhibit at documentas V, VI, VII and IX (1972, 1978, 1982, 1992) and the Biennale di Venezia in 1976, 1993 and 1999. He continued to exhibit in Venice during the Biennale from 2011 onwards, with the European Cultural Centre. His most recent exhibition with this organisation was in 2017, where he exhibited in Palazzo Bembo.

=== Curator ===
For Fifteen People Present Their Favorite Book, a show mounted at Lannis Gallery, New York, in 1967, Kosuth assembled fellow artists Robert Morris, Ad Reinhardt, Sol LeWitt, Robert Mangold, Dan Graham, Robert Smithson, Carl Andre, Robert Ryman, among others. That same year, with fellow artist Christine Kozlov, he founded the Museum of Normal Art, New York, while they were both students at the School of Visual Arts. After giving a work in 1989 to the Sigmund Freud Museum, Vienna, Kosuth, heavily influenced by Freud, he invited other artists to do likewise; today the museum owns 13 works by 13 Freud-influenced Conceptualists. Also in 1989 Kosuth curated the show Ludwig Wittgenstein Das Spiel des Unsagbaren to commemorate the 100th birthday of the philosopher, in which he showed numerous works by fellow artists. The exhibition was shown at the Wiener Secession, Vienna, and the Palais des Beaux-Arts, Brussels.

In response to the debate surrounding conservative attacks on the National Endowment for the Arts in 1990, Kosuth organized an exhibition entitled "A Play of the Unmentionable" focusing on issues of censorship and using works from the permanent collection of the Brooklyn Museum of Art. He culled objects from nearly every department of the museum, including religious paintings, many depictions of nudes, social satire and some erotica; among the selected works, there were sculptures by Auguste Rodin of lesbians embracing, and furniture from the Bauhaus, the avant-garde German design school closed down by the Nazis. These were then juxtaposed with pithy and frequently moving observations from a number of writers in a way that emphasizes how perceptions of art are constantly changing. The works' sometimes extensive labels were written by their curators, while the larger type statements emanated from various art historians, philosophers and social critics.

== Recognition ==
Kosuth was awarded a Cassandra Foundation Grant in 1968, at the age of 23, as the choice of Marcel Duchamp one week before he died. In 1993, he received the Menzione d'Onore at the Venice Biennale and was named a Chevalier de l'ordre des Arts et des Lettres. In 1999, in honour of his work, the French government issued a 3-franc postage stamp in Figeac. In 2001, he received the Laurea Honoris Causa doctorate in Philosophy and Letters from the University of Bologna. In 2003, Kosuth was awarded the Austrian Republic's highest honour for accomplishments in science and culture, the Decoration of Honour in Gold. In 2017 European Cultural Centre Art Award was awarded to Kosuth for his lifelong dedication to create meaning through contemporary art. Other awards include the Brandeis Award (1990) and the Frederick Weisman Award (1991). The Addison Gallery of American Art (Andover, Massachusetts), the Fred Jones Jr. Museum of Art (Norman, Oklahoma), the Honolulu Museum of Art, the Centre for International Light Art (Unna, Germany), the Musée d'art contemporain de Lyon (Lyon, France), the National Gallery of Victoria (Melbourne, Australia), the Saint Louis Art Museum (St. Louis, Missouri), the University of Arizona Museum of Art (Tucson, Arizona), and the Whitney Museum of American Art (New York City) are among the museums holding work by Joseph Kosuth.

== See also ==
- One and Three Chairs - one of Kosuth's most well known pieces
