= Ian Burn =

Australian artist (1939–1993)

- Born: 29 December 1939; Geelong, Australia
- Died: 29 September 1993 (aged 53); Bawley Point, Australia
- Known for: Concept art

Ian Burn (29 December 1939 – 29 September 1993) was an Australian conceptual artist. He was a member of the Art and Language group that flourished in the 1970s. Ian Burn was also an art writer, curator, and scholar.

== Biography ==
Ian Burn was born on 29 December 1939 in Geelong, Australia.

Burn studied art at the National Gallery Art School in Melbourne. He became affiliated with the Art and Language collective when he moved to London in 1964 and remained a part of the group when he moved to New York City in 1967. In 1977, Burn returned to Australia to teach at Sydney University. Ian Burn drowned on 29 September 1993 while swimming in rough seas at Bawley Point, New South Wales.

== Notable work ==
"Xerox Book", 1968 - 100 iterative copies of a blank sheet of white paper on a Xerox 720, arranged in a book in the order they were created. The final pages in the series of copies were filled with black forms that had arisen slowly from the 'error' of the machine. In 1969 Ian Burn, Roger Cutforth and Mel Ramsden proposed one of the first Australian exhibitions of conceptual art, shown at Pinacotheca to which they posted the entire contents of their exhibition in a small box. Ramsden had studied with Burn at the National Gallery School and was included in The Field.
