= Documenta 12 =

2007 art exhibition in Kassel, Germany

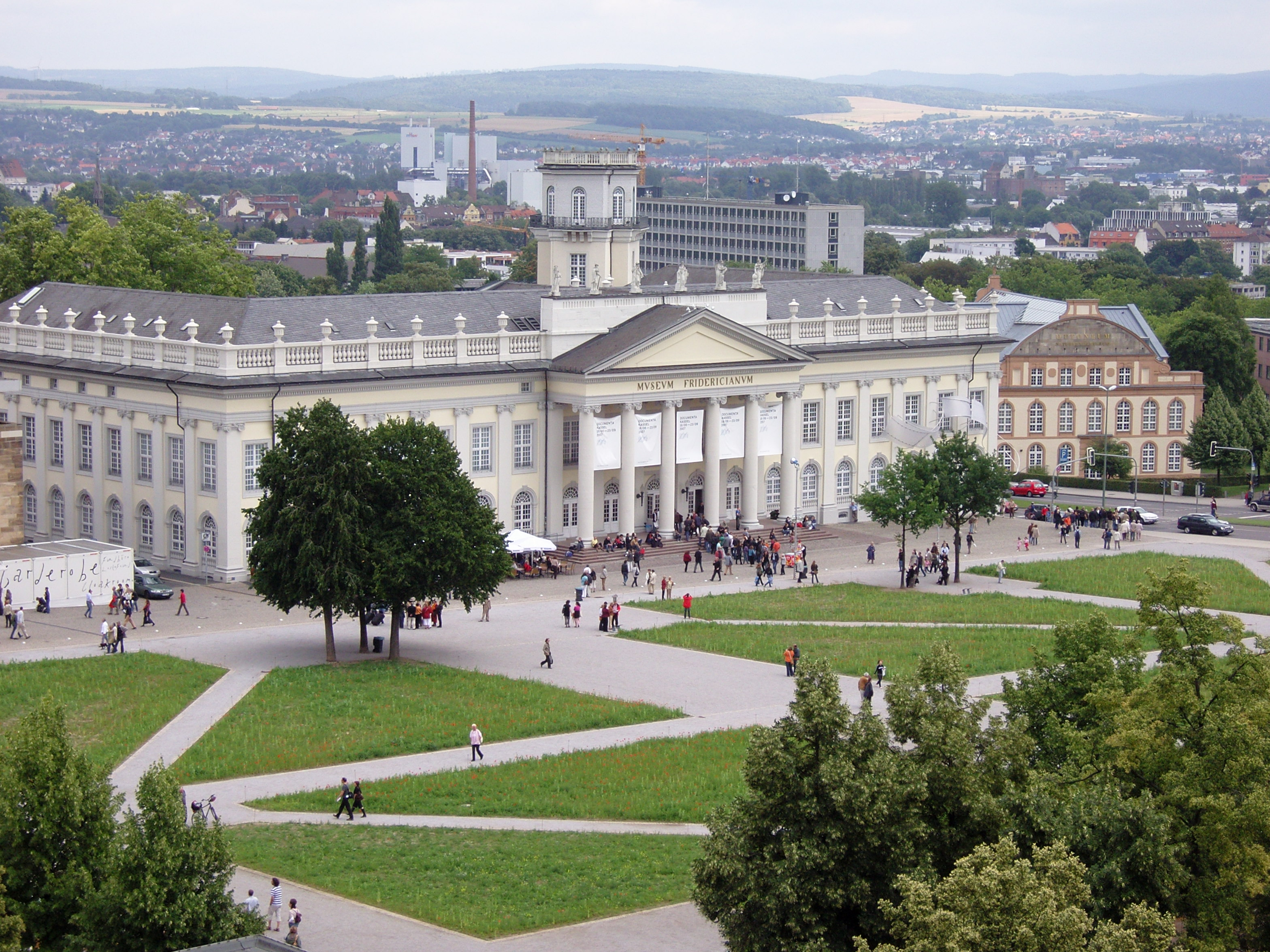
Fridericianum-d12

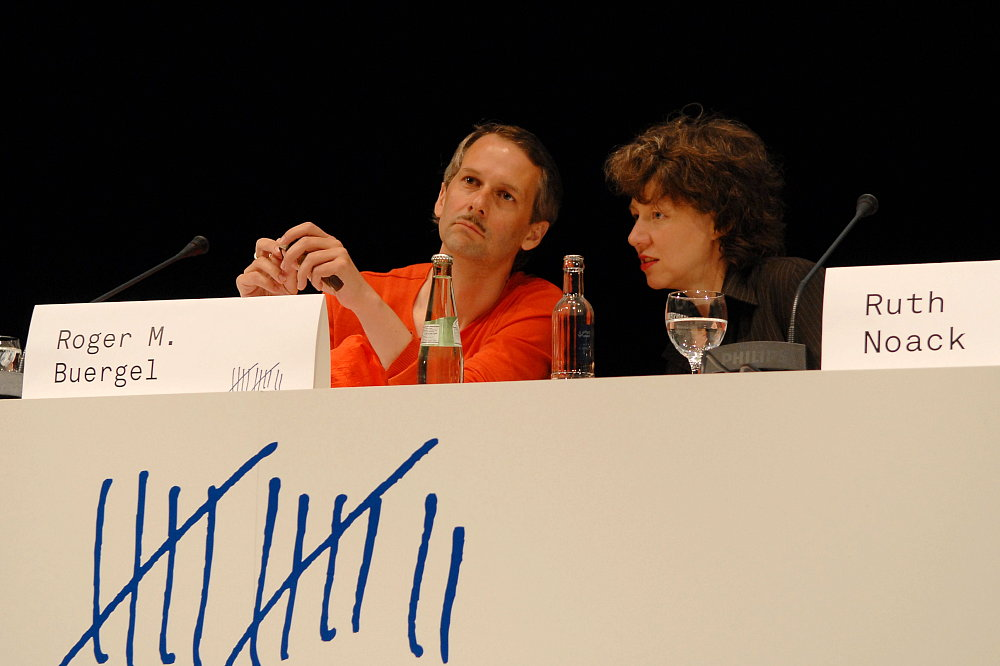
Documenta 12 - Buergel and Noack

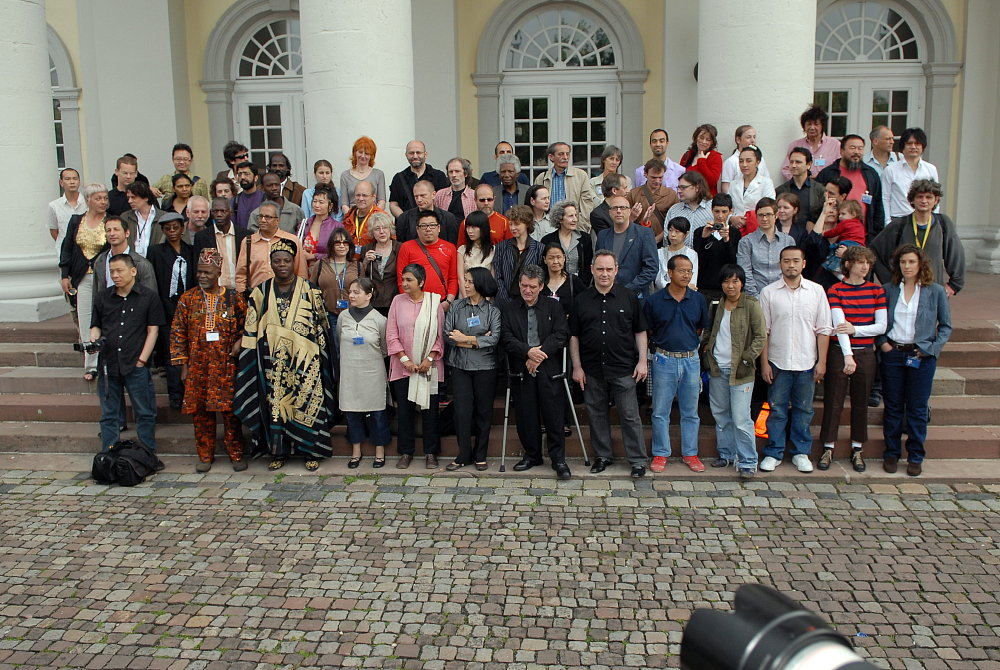
Documenta 12 - group photo

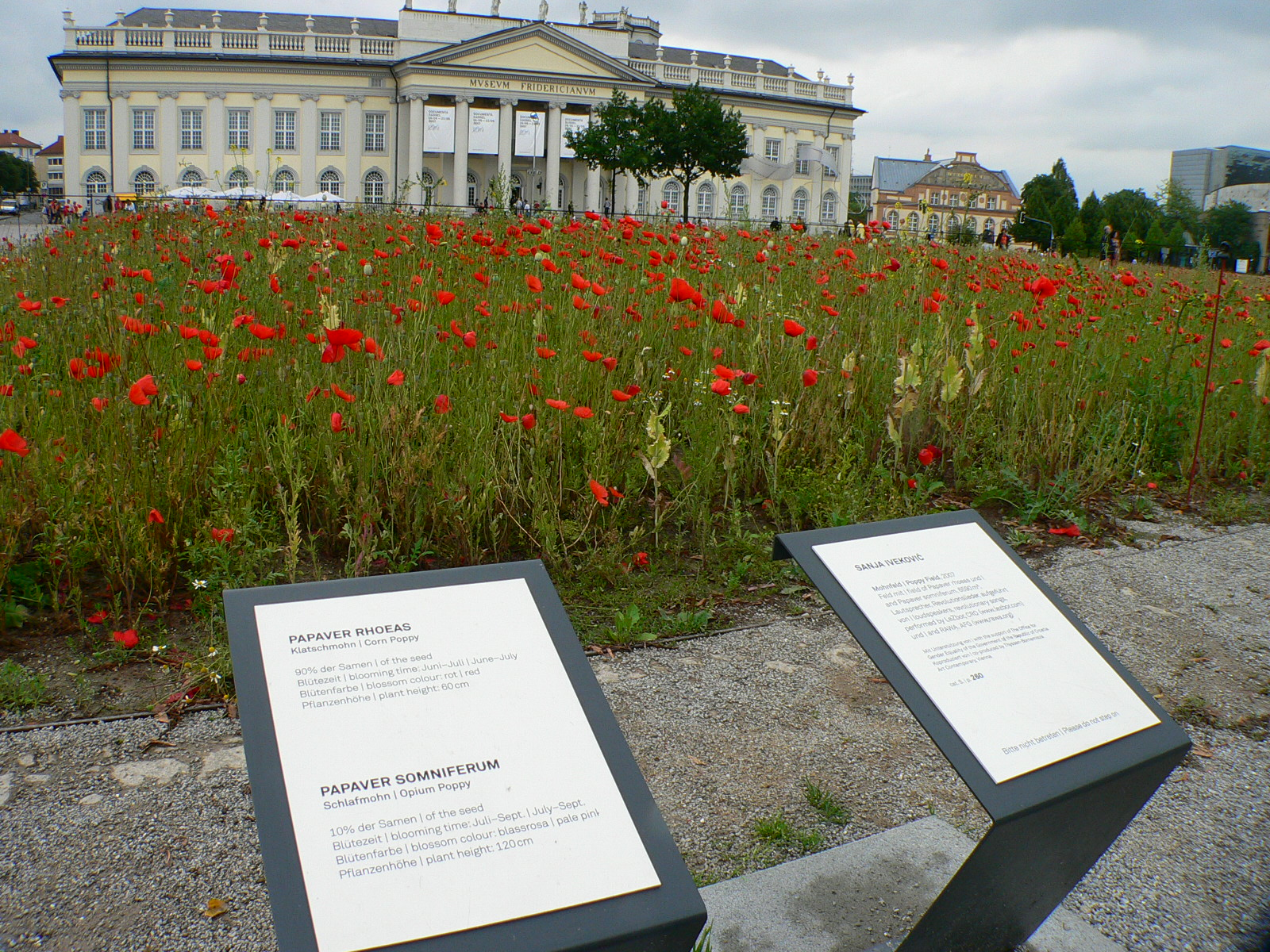
D12 poppy field

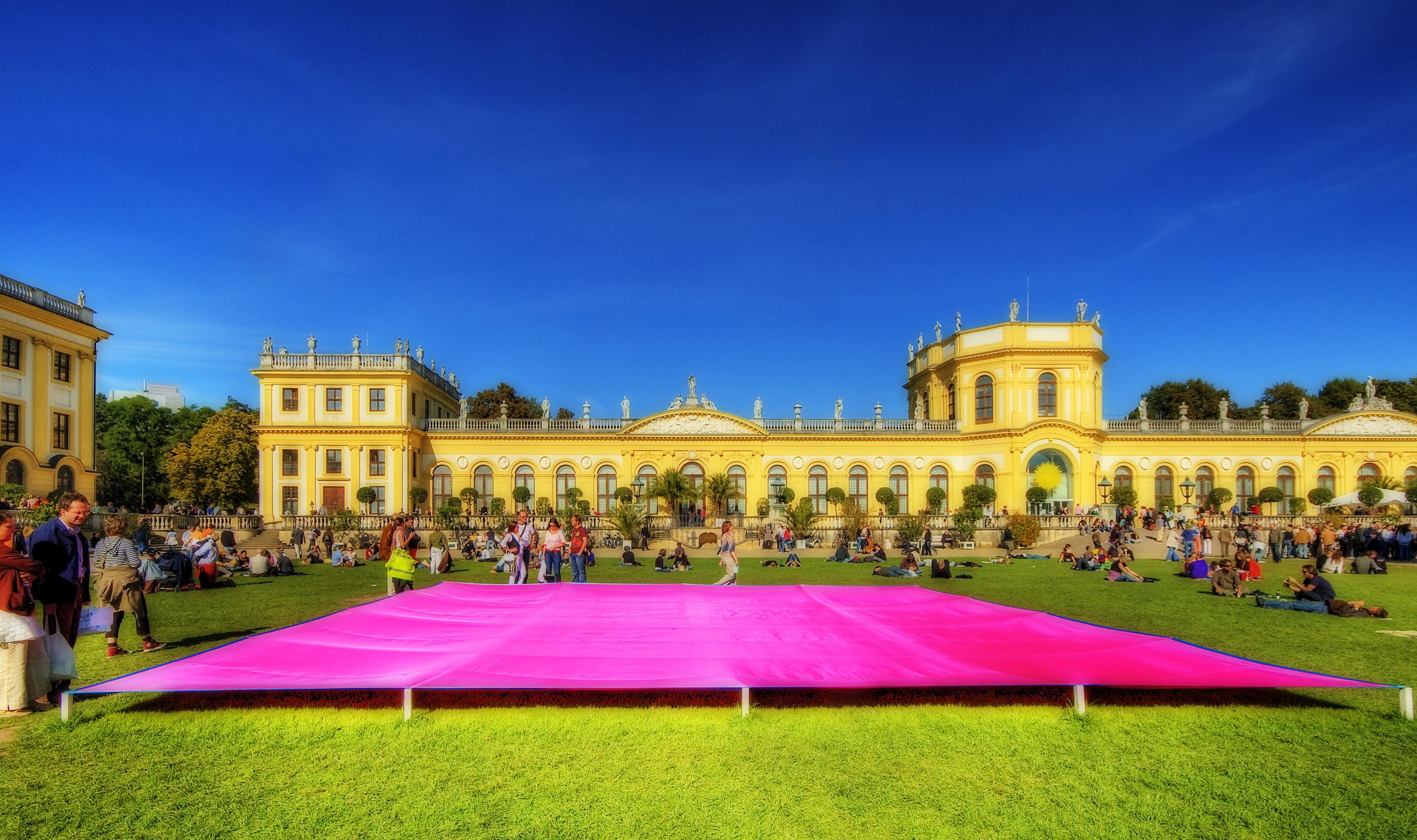
Tanaka Atsuko, Tokyo Work 1955-2007

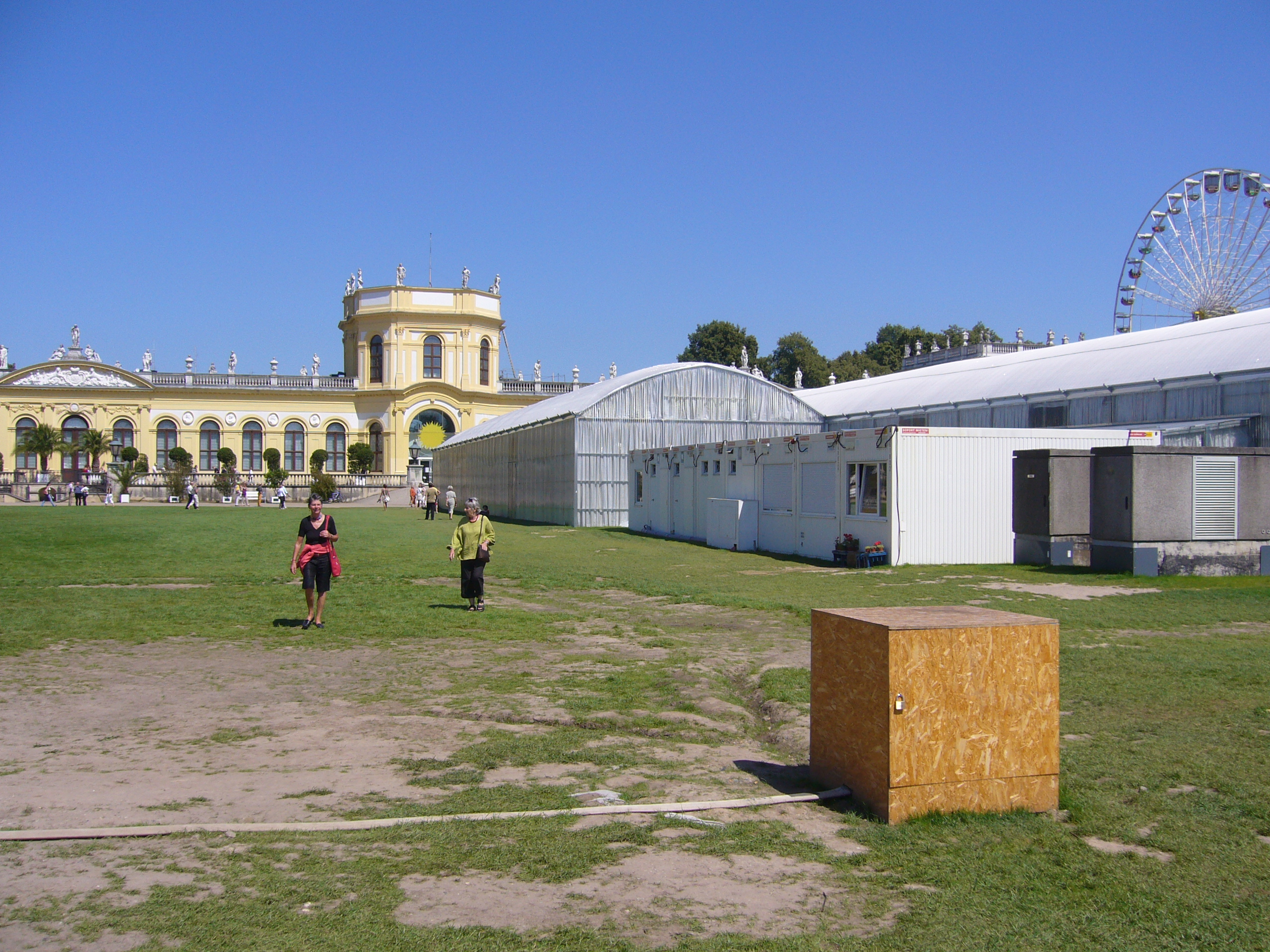
Documenta 12 - Aue-Pavillon (outside)

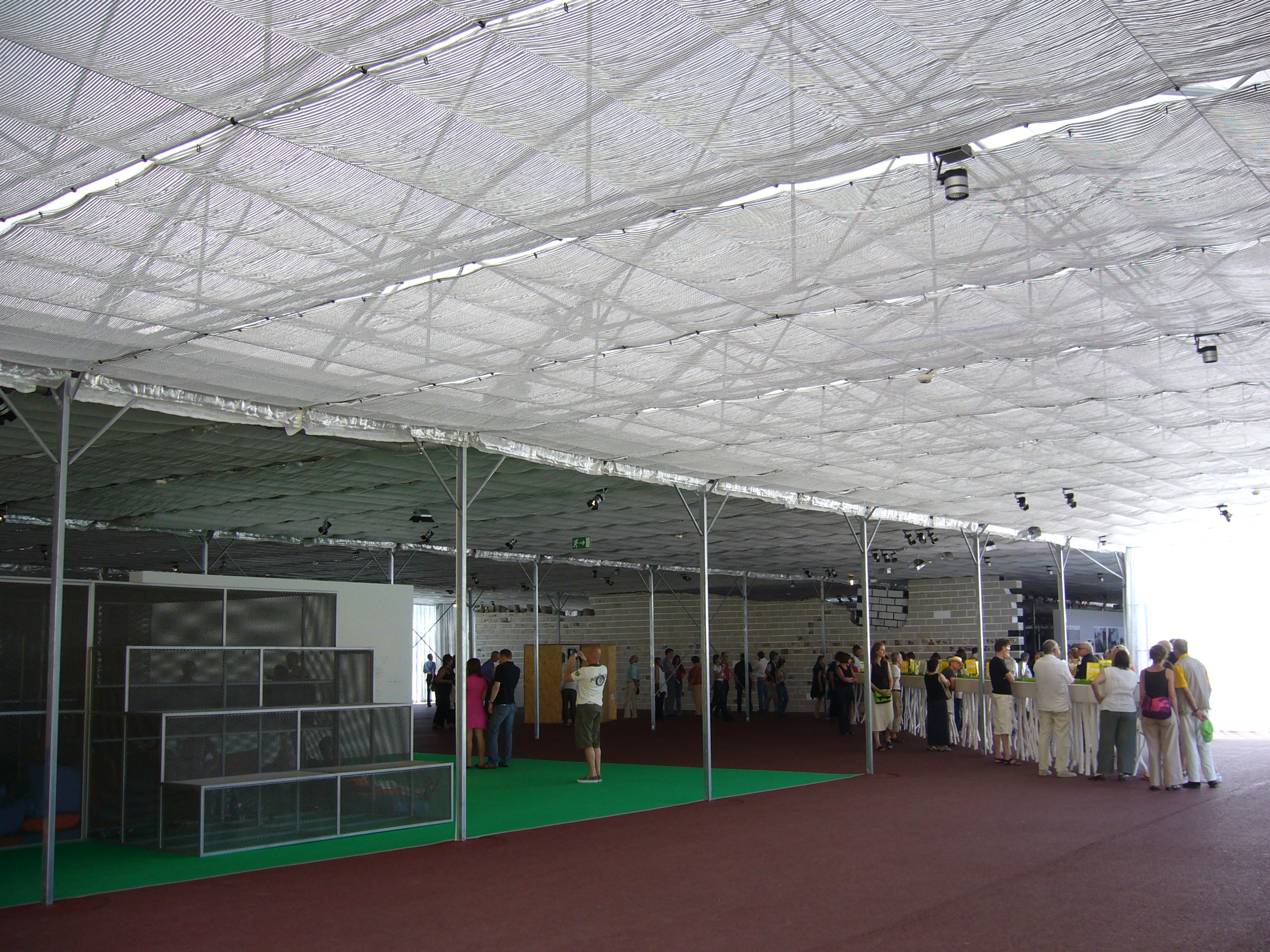
Documenta 12 - Aue-Pavillon (inside)

documenta 12 was the twelfth edition of documenta, a quinquennial contemporary art exhibition. It was held between 16 June and 23 September 2007 in Kassel, Germany. The artistic director was Roger M. Buergel in collaboration with Ruth Noack.

Documenta 12 magazines was one of the central projects of the documenta exhibition. It was conceived and directed by Georg Schöllhammer.

== Documenta 12 magazines ==
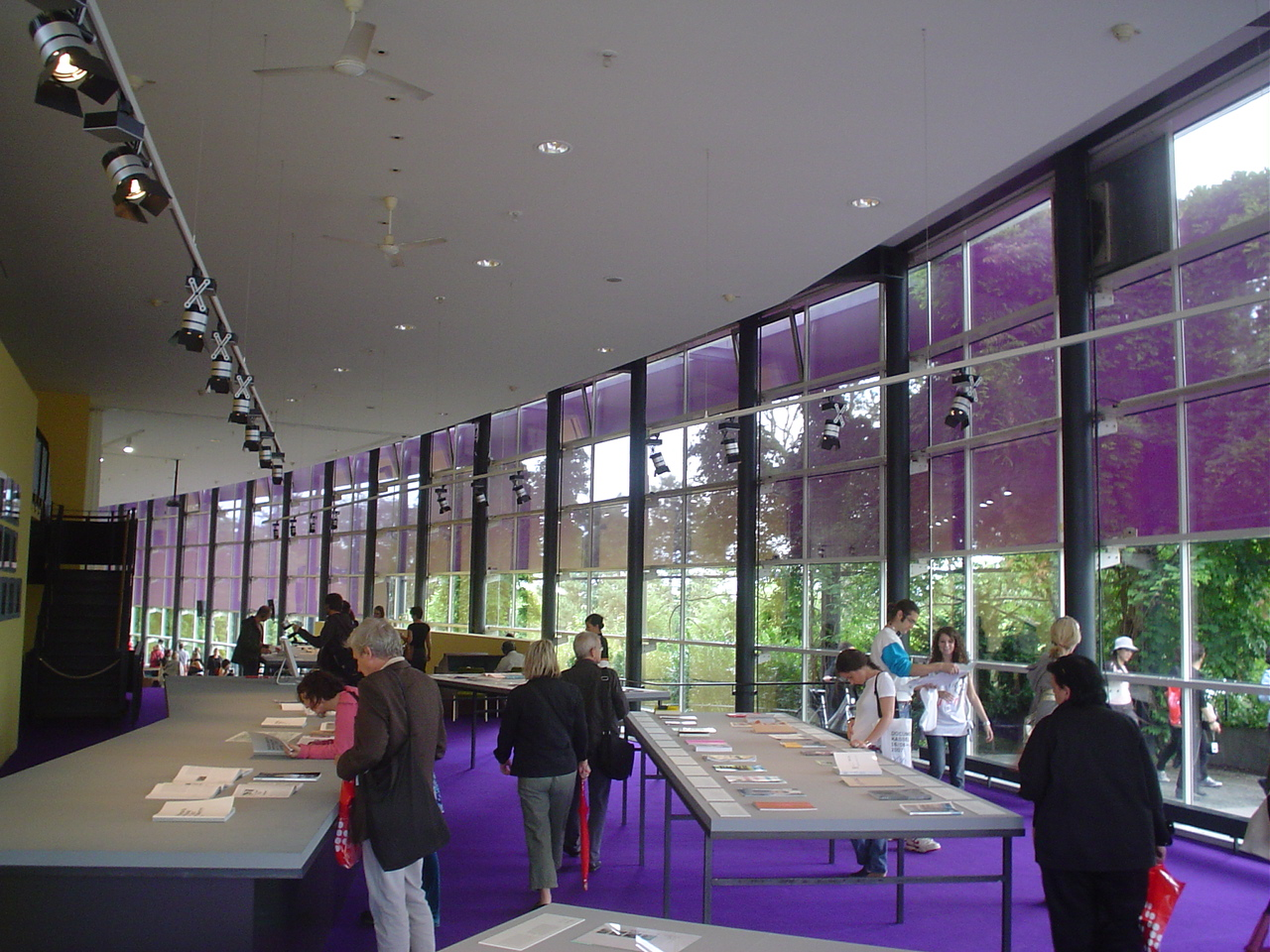

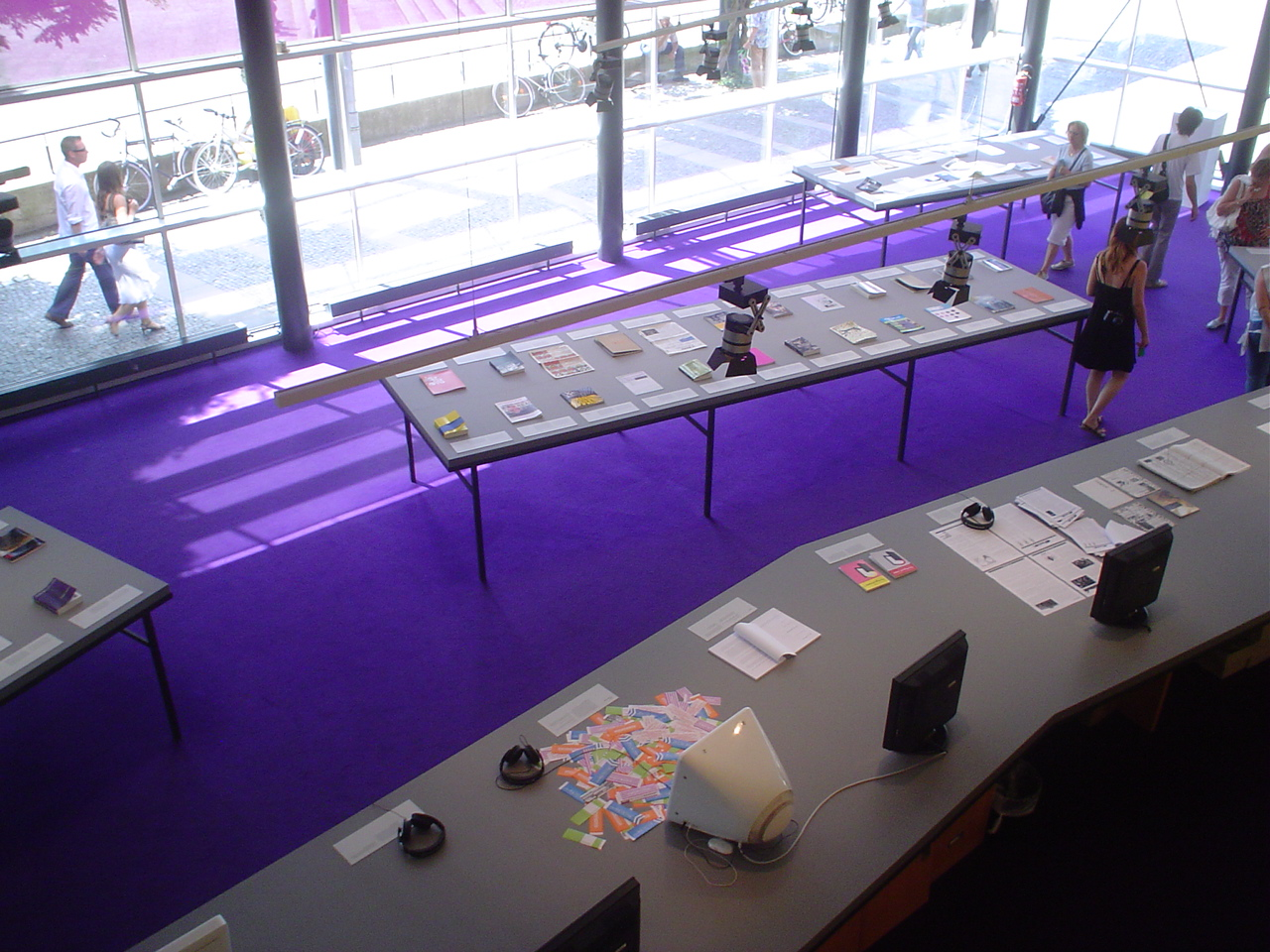

Documenta 12 magazines (also the Magazine project or simply the magazines) was a central project of the 12th edition (2007) of the documenta exhibition, similar in dimensions and world outreach to the "platforms" of the previous edition. Started in 1955, documenta is one of the largest and most influential exhibitions of contemporary art, taking place every five years (since the 1972 edition) in the German city of Kassel. documenta 12 magazines, conceived and directed by Georg Schöllhammer, curator and editor-in-chief of Austrian magazine Springerin, invited over 90 publications – with different formats, media and orientations in the field of art, culture, and politics from around the world – to discuss the motifs and themes of the 2007 edition. The project opened space for artists, art critics and theoreticians to plunge into an exercise of reflection on how major contemporary issues are presented in different socio-cultural contexts. The editorial team of documenta 12 magazines, run by Georg Schöllhammer, included international writers, curators and art critics Heike Ander, Fouad Asfour, Maria Berrios, Cosmin Costinas, Cordula Daus, Hu Fang, and Keiko Sei.

Invited two years before the exhibition (16 June–23 September 2007), the participating publications have generated over 300 articles, essays, interviews, commentaries and illustrated essays that are gathered in the documenta 12 magazines online journal, where interested readers can assemble their own individual magazine. From these contributions also came the three printed editions published by Taschen: "Modernity?"; "Life!" and "Education:", related to the three leitmotifs of documenta 12: Is modernity our antiquity?, What is bare life? and What is to be done (Education)?

This communication process continues during the hundred days of exhibition in documenta-Halle. Editors and authors participate in lectures and meetings, and magazine issues are released to the public.

== Participants ==
A
Sonia Abián
Ferran Adrià
Saâdane Afif
Ai Weiwei
Halil Altındere
Eleanor Antin
Ryōko Aoki
David Aradeon
Ibon Aranberri

B
Monika Baer
Maja Bajević
Yael Bartana
Mária Bartuszová

Ricardo Basbaum
Johanna Billing
Cosima von Bonin
Trisha Brown

C
Graciela Carnevale
James Coleman
Alice Creischer

D
Danica Dakić
Juan Davila
Dias & Riedweg
Gonzalo Díaz

Atul Dodiya
Ines Doujak
Lili Dujourie
Lukas Duwenhögger

F
Harun Farocki (Deep Play)
León Ferrari
Iole de Freitas
Peter Friedl

G
Poul Gernes
Andrea Geyer
Simryn Gill
David Goldblatt
Sheela Gowda
Ion Grigorescu
Grupo de artistas de vanguardia
Dmitri Gutov

H
Sharon Hayes
Romuald Hazoumé
Hu Xiaoyuan
Ashley Hunt

I–J
Sanja Iveković
Luis Jacob
Jorge Mario Jáuregui

K
Amar Kanwar
Mary Kelly

Olga Kisseleva

Bela Kolárová
Abdoulaye Konaté
Bill Kouélany
Jirí Kovanda
Sakarin Krue-On
Zofia Kulik
KwieKulik

L
Louise Lawler
Zoe Leonard
Lin Yilin
Lee Lozano
Lu Hao
M–N
Churchill Madikida
Iñigo Manglano-Ovalle
Kerry James Marshall
Agnes Martin

John McCracken
Nasreen Mohamedi
Andrei Monastyrski
Olga Neuwirth

O
J.D.'Okhai Ojeikere
Anatoli Osmolovsky
George Osodi
Jorge Oteiza

P
Annie Pootoogook
Charlotte Posenenske
Kirill Preobrazhenskiy
Florian Pumhösl

R
Yvonne Rainer
CK Rajan
Gerhard Richter
Alejandra Riera

Gerwald Rockenschaub
Lotty Rosenfeld
Martha Rosler

S
Luis Sacilotto
Katya Sander
Mira Schendel
Dierk Schmidt
Kateřina Šedá
Allan Sekula
Ahlam Shibli
Andreas Siekmann
Nedko Solakov
Jo Spence
Grete Stern
Hito Steyerl
Imogen Stidworthy
Mladen Stilinović

Jürgen Stollhans
Shooshie Sulaiman
Oumou Sy
Alina Szapocznikow

T
Atsuko Tanaka
David Thorne
Guy Tillim

U–Z
Lidwien van de Ven
Simon Wachsmuth
Xie Nanxing
Yan Lei

Tseng Yu-Chin
Zheng Guogu
Artur Żmijewski

== See also ==
- 9 Scripts from a Nation at War
