= Ashley Hunt =

American artist and activist (born 1970)

- Born: April 3, 1970 (age 56); Los Angeles, California, U.S.
- Education: University of California, Irvine; School of the Art Institute of Chicago

Ashley Hunt (born April 3, 1970 in Los Angeles) is an American artist, activist, writer and educator, primarily known for his photographic and video works on the American prison system, mass incarceration and the prison abolition movement. He is currently a faculty member of the School of Art at the California Institute of the Arts.

Hunt’s work is often embedded within the activism and organizing of community organizations, tracing the histories, systems and proliferation of prisons throughout the US, while also exploring vision itself and how people fail to see the extent of incarceration’s impact, the relationship of captivity to the persistence of racism in the U.S., and with what Hunt considers the visual politics of mass incarceration.

Hunt’s art and documentary works are known to push the boundaries between art and activism, often trying to bring the two together. His map-based artworks accompanied a growth in mapping and cartography in contemporary art and activist strategies in the mid-2000s. He has collaborated with other artists, including taisha paggett and her dance company, WXPT and Kim Zumpfe, the artist group of Andrea Geyer, Sharon Hayes, Katya Sander and David Thorne, and with Kenyatta A.C. Hinkle, Regina Agu, Journey Allen, Lisa E. Harris, Michael Khalil Taylor, Rebecca Novak, and Ifeanyi “Res” Okoro at Project Row Houses.

Hunt’s activist projects have featured collaborations with Critical Resistance, California Coalition of Women Prisoners, Friends and Families of Louisiana's Incarcerated Children and the Juvenile Justice Project of Louisiana, the Underground Scholars, and Mass Liberation Arizona.

Hunt’s works have exhibited at institutions such as the Museum of Modern Art, the Hammer Museum, the Coleman Center for the Arts, Documenta 12, the New Museum, and the National Underground Railroad Freedom Center.

== Biography ==
Hunt studied Studio Art and Music at U.C. Irvine and received an MFA from the School of the Art Institute of Chicago, and he was a fellow at the Whitney Independent Study Program. He was faculty and co-chair of the Visual Art program at Vermont College of Fine Arts from 2008–2015, and he has served as faculty in the Photo and Media Program at CalArts since 2008, where he also served as program director from 2010–2019.

== Artworks and career ==
=== Ashes Ashes ===
Ashes Ashes was commissioned for the exhibition, Marking Time: Art in the Age of Mass Incarceration, curated by Nicole Fleetwood. It is a two-channel video and accompanying publication that attempts an abolitionist imagining, asking the viewer to envision “cages as ruins,” considering the scheduled closure of New York City’s Rikers Island as its starting point. Interviews with Ruth Wilson Gilmore, Shana Agid, Dalaeja Foreman, Sophia Gurulé, Pilar Maschi and other members of New York’s former No New Jails Coalition, provide soundtrack to the wandering of Hunt’s camera through wild sections of the shorelines that surround Rikers, observing plants, trees, wildlife and industrial remains. These passages are interrupted by sequences with narration performed by artist, Alia Ali, over archival film and collections of stereographic photographs that capture the time of Rikers’ beginnings, addressing its namesake’s involvement in the slave trade and the island’s expansion by vast landfills of ash — burnt garbage brought from New York’s 19th century modern life, upon which the jail complex sits today. With the refrain, “When Rikers Island was covered in cages,” the jail complex is referred to entirely in the past tense. The film’s epilogue extends its questions to the effects of COVID-19 and the escalated calls for abolition that interrupted the film’s making, following the murders of George Floyd, Breonna Taylor and Ahmaud Arbery, calls that built upon the decades of activism by people like the film’s Gilmore and Agid, Angela Davis and many more. Ashes Ashes “ruminate upon the 2026 scheduled end of Rikers, a non-linear mapping of the history seeped into its tainted ground so as to excavate a hope of abolition. In this way, Hunt treats as malleable the conditions of oppression that oftentimes feel permanent, and leans into a distant, yet fixed indeterminacy that promises celebratory emancipation.”

=== Degrees of Visibility ===
Degrees of Visibility is a large body of landscape photographs made in locations throughout the fifty U.S. states and territories, documenting the spaces in which prisons, jails and detention centers are embedded. Each image is photographed from publicly accessible points of view, studying the ways prisons are presented and camouflaged within our everyday life. Hunt’s theory is that this erasure of contributes to an aesthetics of mass incarceration, whereby the concealment of punishment relieves citizens of their responsibility to it, and is one of the things that allows the system to grow, and in a way that engages “carceral geographies.” Hunt builds each exhibition of Degrees of Visibility in dialogue with local community organizations, which resulted in workshops, public talks, campaign events, and a series of free newspapers that Hunt produces of their conversations. This has included the organizations Critical Resistance, Project South, Southerners On New Ground, California Coalition for Women Prisoners, All of Us or None, Arab Resource and Organizing Center (AROC), Take Back Cheapside, the Underground Scholars, has been exhibited at Wonderroot in Atlanta, the Alabama Contemporary, Coleman Center for the Arts, Foto Forum Santa Fe, the Bolivar Art Gallery of the University of Kentucky, and the Eric Quezada Center for Culture and Politics, and it has been included in the exhibitions Walls Turned Sideways and Visualizing Abolition.

=== Notes on the Emptying of a City ===
Notes on the Emptying of a City is a performance and book based upon Hunt’s time as part of a delegation of activists to New Orleans after Hurricane Katrina, calling for an investigation into the Sheriff’s refusal to evacuate the Orleans Parish Prison, the imprisoned people reported to have drown in their cells, and the reported abuses during survivors’ transfer to prisons around Louisiana. The performance built upon the material Hunt originally incorporated into the short video, “I Won’t Drown on that Levee and You Ain’t Gonna’ Break My Back” (2006), which was the centerpiece for the Campaign for Amnesty for Prisoners of Katrina. A hybrid work that Hunt describes as “a dismantled film,” it combines his own live narration with video of interviews he conducted, footage of a press conference in front of the jail and a “right to return” march and protest held by community organizations and displaced survivors of the storm, while theorizing the building of racism into architecture, planning, policing, gentrification, and state responses to disasters, or disaster capitalism. It includes the voices of Xochitl Bervera, Joe Cook, Althea Francois, Tamika Middleton, and Malik Rahim, from organizations including Common Ground, Critical Resistance, Friends and Families of Louisiana’s Incarcerated Children, Human Rights Watch, NAACP Legal Defense Fund, the People’s Hurricane Relief Fund, and American Civil Liberties Union of New Orleans. The performance was later made into a book, designed by Laura Fields, and published by Vermont College of Fine Arts, and the performance was presented at the Hammer Museum, Los Angeles Municipal Art Gallery, the Philly Fringe Festival, Threewalls Gallery, Project Row Houses, Center for Contemporary Art Santa Fe, the University of Texas at El Paso, the New Museum, Woodbourne Correctional Facility (NY), Putnamville Correctional Facility (IN), and the Arika 12 Performance Festival in Glasgow.

=== A World Map: In Which We See... ===
A World Map: In Which We See... is a conceptual map and accompanying workshop that Hunt created in 2003 to understand statelessness within contemporary globalization. By mapping relationships between two critical discourses in the early 2000s, that of anti-globalization movement as it found its expression in the 1999 Seattle WTO protests, and the anti-prison–industrial complex movement, which revolve in part around the figures of the refugee and the prisoner. Each, according to Hunt, offered a theory of statelessness and a stateless figure, as originally theorized after World War II by theorists like Hannah Arendt. Originally designed digitally, its primary exhibition form is hand-rendered onto a chalkboard or wall. To shape public dialogue on the map, Hunt developed a workshop structure that would create the map in steps with an invited group of community members, leading to a completed map, and eventually a response work that came from the participants. A World Map was included in the Atlas of Radical Cartography, edited by Lize Mogel and Alexis Baghat, and was included in The Global Contemporary at ZKM Center for Art and Media Karlsruhe, Post-American LA at 18th Street Gallery in Los Angeles, Capital it Fails Us Now at UKS in Oslo, and Patriot, at the Baltimore Contemporary.

=== Corrections ===
Corrections (2001) is a feature documentary, Hunt’s first work on the prison industrial complex, distributed by Third World Newsreel. The film features narration and interviews with Ruth Wilson Gilmore, Judy Greene, Christian Parenti, Rose Braz, Ellen Reddy, Helen Reddy, Joseph Dillon Davey, Harmon Wray, David Utter, Shannon Robshaw and others, set against a prison trade show, tours of prison construction sites, visits to department of corrections offices and private prison corporate headquarters, to protests and meetings with community organizers. Together, it looks to the forces behind the massive growth of the US prison system since 1968, as the prison population hits an unprecedented 2 million in the year 2000. The film offered a significant critique of the prison industrial complex that followed the activism galvanized by the first Critical Resistance conference in Berkeley in 1998, and it was both made in dialogue with activist organizations and toured alongside campaigns as a grassroots tool. This included a national grassroots tour funded by the Public Welfare Foundation, It was an official selection in numerous film festivals, including the Slamdance Film Festival, the Atlanta Film Festival, and the Birmingham Sidewalk Film Festival, multiple museum and gallery exhibitions internationally, and is in the collection of over fifty university and public libraries. The reception of Corrections and its engagement with the anti-prison activism of the early 2000s led to its elaboration in the Corrections Documentary Project, which includes ten additional short videos, Hunt's Prison Maps poster project, and study guides based upon his research.

==== Prison Maps ====
Hunt's Prison Maps are a set of two popular education posters, subtitled: "What is the Prison Industrial Complex?", and "What is the Historical Context for the Prison Industrial Complex?" Made to accompany Hunt's 2001 Corrections and incorporating the additional research that came from that project, they exist as an unlimited edition of free prints, often reprinted for exhibitions and community organizing contexts. They were the first of Hunt's projects using cartographic strategies to map discourses and concepts of contemporary politics, mass incarceration and globalization, which also include Order (For the Jena Six), A World Map: In Which We See..., As Flowers Turn Toward the Sun,

== Notable exhibitions ==
- 2005 – Patriot, Contemporary Museum, Baltimore
- 2006 – Look of Law, UC Irvine
- 2006 – Headquarters, Contemporary Museum Baltimore
- 2007 – 9 Scripts from a Nation at War, documenta 12
- 2012 – Made in LA, Hammer Museum
- 2012 – The Global Contemporary
- 2012 – Sinopale, Sinop, Turkey
- 2013 – Maintenance Required, The Kitchen
- 2014 – To Shoot a Kite, Cue Art Foundation
- 2015 – Inside/Outside: Prison Narratives, Wignall Museum of Contemporary Art
- 2018 – Walls Turned Sideways, Contemporary Arts Museum Houston
- 2018 – On the Inside Out, Monroe-Brown Gallery, Western Michigan University
- 2020 – Marking Time: Art in the Age of Mass Incarceration, MoMA PS1
- 2020 – Visualizing Abolition, San Jose Museum of Art
- 2021 – Undoing Time: Art and Histories of Incarceration, ASU Art Museum
