= 9 Scripts from a Nation at War =

Video installation artwork

- Artist: Andrea Geyer; Sharon Hayes; Ashley Hunt; Katya Sander; David Thorne
- Year: 2007
- Medium: Ten-channel video installation
- Subject: War
- Location: Museum of Modern Art (MoMA), New York, New York, U.S.
- Owner: MoMA
- Accession: 12.2011.1-10
- Runtime: 8 hours, 53 minutes, 45 seconds

9 Scripts from a Nation at War is a ten-channel video installation by Andrea Geyer, Sharon Hayes, Ashley Hunt, Katya Sander, and David Thorne. The work focuses on the war on terror and the Iraq War and addresses the roles of language, speech, and subjectivity in war. It features actors and interview subjects reading from various scripts drawn from Guantanamo military commission proceedings, interviews, and blog posts.

9 Scripts was created for and first exhibited in 2007 at the documenta 12 art exhibition in Kassel, Germany. It consists of ten videos with a total run time of 8 hours, 53 minutes, and 45 seconds. It is shown across ten channels by video projection and speakers, and on individual screens built into seated displays with headphones.

== Sources ==
- Bee, Harriet Schoenholz; Heliczer, Cassandra; McFadden, Sarah, eds. (2013). MoMA Highlights: 350 Works from the Museum of Modern Art, New York (3rd rev. ed.). New York: Museum of Modern Art. ISBN 978-0-87070-846-6.
- Derksen, Jeff (2013). "Ends of Culture". In Dobson, Kit; McGlynn, Áine (eds.). Transnationalism, Activism, Art. Toronto: University of Toronto Press. pp. 54–80. ISBN 978-1-4426-4319-2.
- McCarthy, David (2015). American Artists Against War, 1935–2010. Oakland, California: University of California Press. ISBN 978-0-520-28670-2.
- White, Ian (2008). "One Script for 9 Scripts from a Nation at War". Afterall (18): 100–107. doi:10.1086/aft.18.20711701 – via University of Chicago Press.
