= Tucumán arde =

1968 Argentine art event series

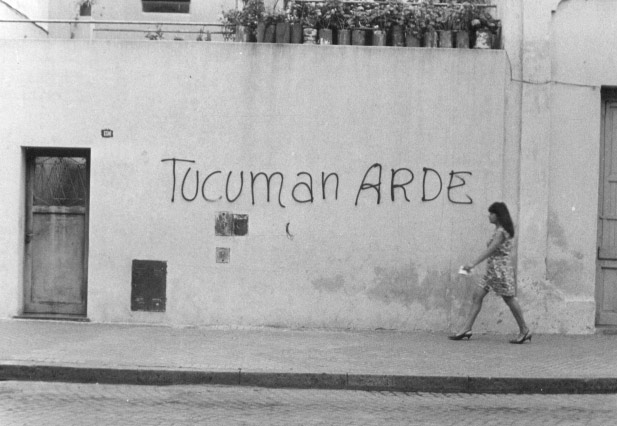
Tucumán arde

Tucumán Arde (translated "Tucumán is Burning") was a series of art events in Buenos Aires and Rosario, Argentina, in 1968 that addressed the living and working conditions under military dictator Juan Carlos Onganía. The events were organized and executed by a group of artists that included María Teresa Gramuglio, Nicolás Rosa, Juan Pablo Renzi, León Ferrari, Roberto Jacoby, Norberto Puzzolo, and Graciela Carnevale.

== Background ==
Their goal was to expose the situation in Tucumán Province, an impoverished province was one of the biggest sugar-producing regions in the country. The government had just closed the sugar refineries causing economic and social distress. The government had tried to use the region as an example of the soundness of its economic policy, calling it the "garden of the republic" in its propaganda. The artists sought to circumvent censorship efforts to expose the actual poverty and starvation.

Because of this situation, Tucumán came to be an example of governmental hypocrisy and negligence. Out of the twenty-three Argentine provinces, it ranked sixth in production but sixteenth in literacy, fifteenth in infant mortality and thirteenth in school retention. Juan Carlos Onganía, the head of the dictatorship chose the province as a place to represent the stability of his governmental policies. The government publicized a fictional industrialization plan and promoted the slogan “Tucuman, the Garden of the Republic” accompanied by paradisal posters of the province. It was an orchestrated cover-up of the economic and political crisis.

Also during 1968, Argentina witnessed an increase of rebellion by artists against the government. The brutal oppression of the military dictatorship and the limits enforced on the artists’ freedom of expression developed into a crisis.

== Overview ==
The artists' project unfolded in several phases, beginning with a research phase in which participants gathered information about the living and working conditions in the province. Then, the collective organized a series of exhibitions in three different cities--Buenos Aires, Santa Fe, and Rosario—to publicize their findings. To promote the exhibitions, they used graffiti and stickers all over the city.

In August 1968, artists from Rosario, Santa Fe and Buenos Aires organized the “First National Meeting of Avant-Garde Art” to generate a form of art that would be completely new: ethically, aesthetically, and ideologically. With the help of sociologists, economists, journalists, and photographers, the group decided to start an operation of “counter-information” to counteract the government's publicity about Tucumán and to reveal the real condition of the province. The artists aimed to become publicists and activists in the social struggle in Tucuman. This project came to be Tucumán Arde (Tucumán is Burning).

It was the Rosario artists who dealt with the repercussions of the work. There were only two artists from Buenos Aires, León Ferrari, and Roberto Jacoby.

== Phases ==
=== First Stage ===
The artists gathered information—including statistics and firsthand accounts—on the Tucumán problem and the social reality of the province. This stage was completed with a prior fact-finding trip, to mark the essential aspects of the problem and establish the first connections.

=== Second Stage ===
This stage consisted of confrontation and verification of the Tucumán reality for which the artists traveled to Tucumán alongside a technical team of journalists, where interviews, reports, recordings were done to use them in the denunciation-exhibition.

=== Third Stage ===
The denunciation-exhibition was held to reveal the profound contradictions caused by the economic-political system based on hunger and unemployment and the creation of a false cultural superstructure. It was held in both Rosario and central Buenos Aires. In Rosario, the exhibition took place in the buildings of the Conferderacion General de Trabajadores de Los Argentinos (CGT, General Workers Confederation of the Argentines). Forty people contributed to the creation of the show. All the documented material from the trip was used in a montage of audio-visual media, including oral information to the public on the part of the artists, intellectuals and specialists who participated in the investigation. The exhibits included collected interviews with the people about living conditions in Tucuman, mural photographs, and research about the accumulation of wealth by the richer families. Walking into the exhibit the public stepped on the names of the owners of the sugar plantations. Additionally, the rooms were darkened every ten minutes to represent the frequency of deaths of children. Each time the facts were explained through loudspeakers in every room. The exhibition lasted two weeks in Rosario, but the similar exhibition in Buenos Aires was closed after two days. Police pressure on the unions became so strong that the CGT caved in rather than risk larger repercussions. The artists described the project as the pursuit of a cultural profile of the province. Using that they deceived the media and received favorable coverage for their project.

=== Fourth Stage ===
The fourth and last stage consisted of the closing of the information circuit on the Tucumán problem and comprised gathering and analysis of the documentation; publication of the results of the analysis; publication of bibliographic and audio-visual materials; and founding of a new aesthetic and evaluation.

Material from the original exhibition was included in documenta 12 and credited to the Grupo de Artistas de Vanguardia.

=== Analysis ===
Tucumán Arde was both a success and a failure. Despite the short duration of the events set an example for what the manifesto handed at the entrance of the exhibition called for, “an art that modifies the totality of the social structure; an art that transforms, one that destroys the idealist separation between artwork and reality.” However, the participants only focused on the event and not on the broader strategy that could have generated other events.

After Tucumán Arde, police and army repression increased and most of the artists who had been involved in the project stopped producing art for several years. Some went underground and joined the guerilla movement, some were “disappeared” and at least one of them died, Eduardo Favario. Galleries only showed apolitical and harmless traditional paintings. This period became known as the "Silence of Tucumán Arde".

Tucumán Arde was fundamentally a political project because artists were responding to the reality of repression and awareness of socioeconomic inequality. These conditions triggered the intervention of art into politics. Even artists originally distant from social issues became politicized. Although Tucumán Arde was designed to affect the exploited people, who were supposed to become coauthors a change the course of the story, its main impact was on the elite which included artists who defined themselves as part of Avant-Garde. Due to this, one can say that Latin American conceptualism emerged as an aesthetic more concerned with reality than with abstraction.
