= Zofia Kulik =

Polish artist

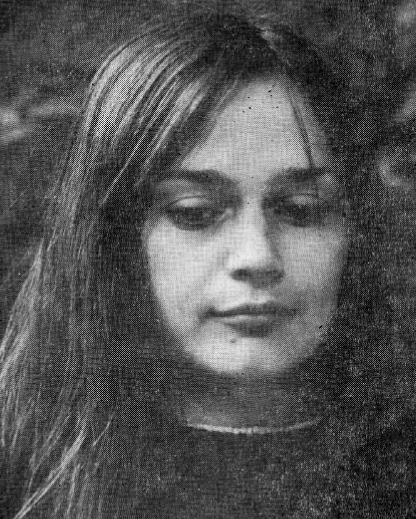
- Kulik in 1971
- Born: 1947 (age 78–79); Wrocław
- Education: Academy of Fine Arts, Warsaw
- Known for: Film as Sculpture, Sculpture as Film, All the Missiles Are One Missile, Splendid of Myself, From Siberia to Cyberia
- Website: kulikzofia.pl/en/

Zofia Kulik (born 1947 in Wrocław, Poland) is a Polish artist living and working in Łomianki (Warsaw), whose art combines political criticism with a feminist perspective.

== Career ==
Kulik studied at the Sculpture Department of the Warsaw Academy of Fine Arts from 1965 to 1971. Her diploma was realized in many stages and consisted of several parts: one of its elements was a theoretical thesis, later titled Film as Sculpture, Sculpture as Film, in which the artist put forward a series of considerations regarding 'extended' sculpture.

After her graduation, she started working with Przemysław Kwiek (born 1945) by forming the artistic duo KwieKulik. The project lasted from 1971 to 1987, which was also the time of their partnership. They carried out performances, interventions and artistic demonstrations, as well as creating objects, films and photographs. Their art was highly political and as a response to the rejection of their ideas from both the regime and the Polish neo avant-garde, the duo set up an independent gallery called the Studio of Activities, Documentation and Propagation (PDDiU) in their private apartment in Warsaw. In the frame of PDDiU they created an archive of Polish Art from the 1970s/80s, organized lectures and exhibitions.

The duo was influenced by the concept of the Open Form introduced by their professor Oskar Hansen (1922–2005): considering the documentation of the process of the production of a work to be more important than the finished work itself.

"We believed in the possibility of smooth cooperation with other artists, in the possibility of collective work, free from the problem of authorship, from worries over ‘what is whose’ and ‘who did what’. An artist should be free and unselfish, and the ‘new’ should be generated at the meeting point of me-and-others, in interaction”. - Zofia Kulik

Towards the end of the 1980s, the partners’ path parted in life and art alike.

Since 1987, Kulik changed the direction of her interest: "I am fascinated by the Closed Form. I wish to be in a museum" – she declared. She moved towards her avant-garde concept of building an archive – a revolutionary approach that tackles archiving as an essential artistic practice. That was when Kulik began to create monumental, black and white, photographic compositions resulting from the process of multiple exposures of manifold negatives from the artist's archive of images. Kulik's photo collages adopted a variety of forms: from photo-carpets to columns, gates, medals, mandalas, to open-ended compositions, such as From Siberia to Cyberia.

Thematically, she focuses on the relationship men and women, the individual and the mass, as well as on symbols of power and totalitarianism. Following the continuum of recurring signs and gestures, a further pivotal part of her work is the phenomenon of mass-media, and its influence on consumers. Her works have been introduced to a wider audience at the documenta 12 in Kassel (2007) and at the 47th Venice Biennale (1997) and Museum Bochum (2005). Being part of renowned international collections such as Tate Modern, MoMA NY, Centre Pompidou, Moderna Museet, and Stedelijk Museum, her work became part of the reopened permanent exhibition at the MoMA NY.

== Selected works ==
=== Film as Sculpture, Sculpture as Film, 1971 ===
In her graduation diploma "Film as Sculpture, Sculpture as Film", Kulik shifted her interest from the material, static sculpture-object to an analysis of the dynamic spectator-object relationship. She put forward a series of considerations regarding 'extended' sculpture addressing a question how sculpture 'comes into being' through the experience of the viewer. Her theory assumed that a sculpture is a process in time, with no precise beginning or end, with no concrete narrative or history. For this reason, instead of sculpture, her method was to choose photo sequences taken whilst working on materials, models' bodies, and found objects. Kulik's graduation exhibition at the Fine Arts Academy was titled Instead of Sculpture. It was a three-channel slide installation composed of approximately 450 photographs which document Kulik's activity in her studio as well as the activity of other students around the school. The artist sees the photos as a visual diary, saying "the parallel projection gave an image of three interwoven threads. In the plastic thread: material and spatial transformations, in the life thread: occurrences in time and space and among people from the nearest circle, in the record thread: operations on the slides – the medium of the message."

After the end of her collaboration with Przemysław Kwiek, Zofia Kulik started to create large photographs. The self-portraits came as a manifestation of an awakening of self-identity. Along with this self-justification followed the ornament which served as a way for Kulik to unravel a vision of history, politics and art as a continuum of recurring signs and gestures linked to an individual experience. Materialised in an archive of images, Kulik implemented about 700 photographs of a naked male model, presented on a black background, striking poses of symbolic gestures taken from ancient Greek vases, catholic iconography as well as Stalinist memorials. Archive of Gestures (1987–91) had been incorporated into an extensive collection, created by Kulik from the very beginning of her artistic practice and used as a source for projects. Her pieces are produced as photo montages, using multiple exposures of negatives on photo paper through precisely made stencils. In this way, one work can consist of hundreds single images.

=== All the Missiles Are One Missile, 1991, 300 x 850 cm ===
The work All the Missiles Are One Missile resembles an ornate "Oriental" carpet, but with a reeling, kaleidoscopic look, also connecting with images and designs in illuminated medieval manuscripts and hints at cathedrals. It is divided into two apparently symmetrical parts resembling church elevations, yet the contents of the left and the right side are not entirely identical: The left wing is devoted to a woman, showing a monument called The Country Our Mother from Saint Petersburg in the middle of the rosette, a reproduction of Szyndler’s painting Eve (1902) featuring a timid-looking girl, as well as TV screen frames showing rows of women, such as dancing girls, girls in the Miss America Competition or Chinese girls singing in the name of Mao. The right wing is devoted to a man, showing a monument called "Back and Front from Magnitogorsk (symbol city of industrial power of the USSR), the multiplied nude figure of a man holding a drapery triumphantly over his head, as well as rows of TV screen frames showing soldiers from all over the world. More TV frames can be seen at the top and the bottom of the work, where grey stripes depict an execution in 1941 from a documentary called The Russia We Lost shown by Moscow’s television in 1993. The title of Kulik's work is a paraphrase of T.S. Eliot’s words "...all the women are one woman", coming from his commentary to The Waste Land, Part III. The Fire Sermon.

=== Splendid of Myself ===
In the self-portrait Splendour of Myself Zofia Kulik presents herself as a queen, evoking historical associations to the official portrait of Queen Elisabeth I and thus establishing a sense of female power. The sumptuous, ornamented robe she dresses herself in consists of many black-and-white and multiple exposure photographs of her male model and artist friend Zbigniew Libera. By turning the images of the naked model into her garment and arranging them in such a miniature, geometrical and abstract way, Kulik subordinates the male, which even increases the notion of female authority. As splendid as her dress appears to be, the crown and royal attributes Kulik decorates herself with are made of lettuce leaves, a cucumber and a dandelion – objects of a rural, daily life. The artist thus creates a clash between rich and poor, the home and the state.

„In a sense it is easy, banal and kitschy. The subtlety of this work relies on its complexity. I feel that a great value of my work is the fact that I´m a talented organizer of compound visual structures. In turn all of the details are simple, like in a common song about love, death etc. My whole work is based on the fact that I permanently collect and archive the images of this world. The complexity of this work comes from the richness of the archive that I possess.” - Zofia Kulik (1998)

=== From Siberia to Cyberia, 1998–2004, 240 x 2100 cm ===
From Siberia to Cyberia is a monumental photo-mural which returns to the "fluid", open-end form, amenable to being continuously expanded in horizontal sequence. The monumental grid of identical small black and white frames is made of screen shots of the artist's TV set, arranged chronologically starting in 1978 and ending in 2004. They are arranged in panels that, when seen from a distance, reveal a pattern of empty frames in zigzag, accentuating the flow of the sequences: The dynamic of the horizontal zigzag is reminiscent of Constantin Brâncuși's vertical Endless Column. Apparently it's a "vibrating visual mass" of undifferentiated small pictures, which lost their specific content in order to become building blocks in an endless carpet – but on a closer inspection, it is possible to view every single photo clearly, revealing a complex web of parallel stories. The mural can be seen as a visual book of a televised reality.
