= Zbigniew Libera =

Polish artist best known for his controversial artwork named LEGO Concentration Camp

- Born: 7 July 1959 (age 66); Pabianice, Polish People's Republic
- Education: Copernicus University in Torun
- Known for: Photography, pop art
- Notable work: LEGO Concentration Camp

Zbigniew Stanisław Libera (born 7 July 1959) is a Polish artist, born in Pabianice, Poland. Libera's artworks are considered to fall under the styles of pop art and critical art, and are frequently used to comment on political and social issues.

Considered one of the most renowned Polish artists to date, Libera considers himself the "Father of Critical Art". Libera is best known for his controversial 1996 artwork named LEGO Concentration Camp, depicting a Nazi concentration camp made out of Lego bricks. The artwork attracted much controversy, including The Lego Group threatening legal action.

Libera is also famous for his photography and videography such as Intimate Rites (1984), How to Train Little Girls (1987), and Pozytywy (English: Positives). Pozytywy is a series featuring Libera's photographs that capture humans living in war-torn cities.

== Early life ==
Zbigniew Libera was born and raised in Pabianice, Łódź Voivodeship, Poland, to a single mother whose occupation was nursing. Libera spent much of his life in Poland and studied at the Nicolaus Copernicus University in Toruń. Libera began his career as an artist in the mid-1980s, working with an avant-garde group known as "Sternenhoch". Amongst the "Sternenhoch" group were artists such as Andrezej Partum and Zofia Kulik. In 1982, Libera held his first exhibition in Łódź.

In December 1981, during the Communist rule of Poland, Libera created, printed and published leaflets, posters, and political cartoons designed to challenge laws that were introduced to suppress protests at the Wujek Coal Mine, which eventually led to the Pacification of Wujek. For distributing anti-government material, Libera was arrested in 1982 and sentenced to a total of eighteen months in prison. Art critics and fellow artists have said that Libera's time in prison contributed to his development as an artist. Libera has created several other photography artworks and videos, including La Vue 2004 – 2006, Intimates Rites 1984 and Positives 2002 – 2003. Zbigniew Libera resides and works in Warsaw.

== LEGO Concentration Camp ==
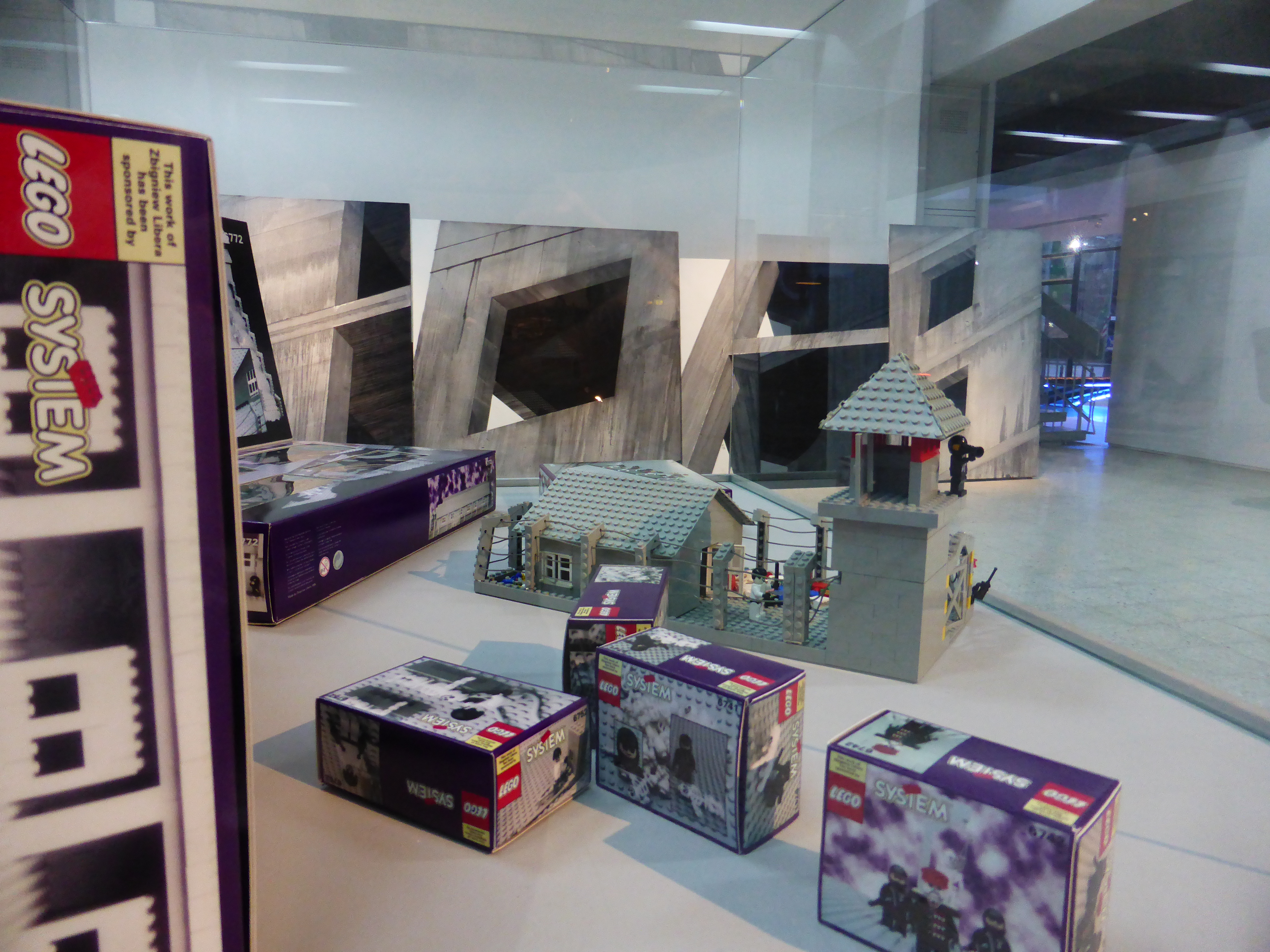
LEGO Concentration Camp at the Museum of Modern Art, Warsaw

Libera is best known for his artwork LEGO Concentration Camp, created in 1996. The artwork, which was part of a series called "Corrective Appliances", is considered Libera's most controversial work due to its subject matter, as it depicted Nazi concentration camps, which were used by Nazi Germany to systemically exterminate Jews and other "undesirables" during the Holocaust.

The models, made of Lego bricks and featuring mostly unmodified Lego minifigures (featuring skeleton prisoners, Schutzstaffel-esque guards, and loose body parts), depict representations of barracks, watchtowers, and barbed wire fences seen in concentration camps. LEGO Concentration Camp includes boxes for the sets that were designed to closely resemble actual packaging used for Lego sets, with the box designs including text labels reading "This work of Zbigniew Libera has been sponsored by LEGO", prominently featuring the Lego logo. After building each model, Libera photographed the sets and the minifigures (including scenes such as mass graves and guards beating skeletonized prisoners, evoking imagery of the Holocaust), cut each photograph up into puzzle pieces, and put them into the boxes.

The Lego Group provided Libera with the bricks and minifigures after he requested a donation from their community outreach programs in Poland. According to The Lego Group, the only information they had received from Libera about his artistic intentions was that he would build either a house or a hospital using their bricks. Libera viewed the donation as direct sponsorship and support for his work, and thus placed labeling on the packaging claiming The Lego Group had sponsored the work, despite The Lego Group not knowing what the bricks were going to be used for.

The models, photographs, packaging, and puzzle pieces have since been purchased for thousands of dollars and displayed by museums and art galleries worldwide. Libera's work also inspired the Jewish Museum in New York City to host their "Mirroring Evil: Nazi Imagery / Recent Art" exhibition in 2002. LEGO Concentration Camp is currently owned and displayed by the Museum of Modern Art in Warsaw.

=== Reception ===
LEGO Concentration Camp attracted much attention and controversy, mostly due to its subject matter and The Lego Group's identity as a respected toy company that produces child-friendly products. Libera was criticized by the curator of the Polish Pavilion and sculptor Jan Stanislaw for the inappropriate use of children's toys. The Polish Pavilion invited Libera to display his works in the famous Venice Biennale art exhibition; however, Stanislaw told Libera not to include LEGO Concentration Camp in the display.

Notable criticism came from The Lego Group itself, who believed Libera created the piece intending to be the centre of debate and attention. The Lego Group also stated they were unaware of Libera's intentions when they provided him with the building blocks, and said that if they were aware Libera was going to make concentration camp buildings using their products, they would not have given him the bricks. On 24 February 1997, The Lego Group released an official press release on the issue, declaring that they believe Libera's work to be "disturbing and deplorable", and refusing to take ownership for sponsoring the artwork.

Libera made consistent attempts to combat criticism, stating that it was never his intention to provide a LEGO Concentration Camp to children as a toy and that he only had artistic intent in making the work. He clarified that the meaning behind the artwork was to highlight the contrast between the horrors of the real world, and the perfect world presented to children. The Jewish Museum in New York supports Libera's piece as it represents a "pivotal event in Jewish history" and important cultural attitudes. Joan Sall, curator of the Levinthal exhibition in the Museum of Judaica, also supports Libera's artwork, arguing that it cleverly demonstrates an ironic point of view, where an otherwise innocuous children's toy is used to show a destructive moment in history. Sall argues that the clear irony of Libera's artwork signifies that the Holocaust is not just Jewish history, but world history.

== Works ==
=== Videography ===
Libera's rise to fame as an artist began in the 1980s in Europe when he released a video series beginning with Intimate Rites (1984), followed by How to Train Little Girls (1987), and Mystical Perseverance (1984–1990). These videos became popular in Europe as a result of the controversial topic Libera based them on; hospitals and death. Intimate Rites is allegedly influenced by the treatments that Libera's grandmother endured in her later life, such as being showered, being spoonfed, and having her diapers changed. Mystical Perseverance is said to have also been influenced by Libera's grandmother and her strange actions that came about as a result of her slow deterioration due to illness. How to Train Little Girls is a political comment on societal norms, such as sexual roles.

=== Photography ===
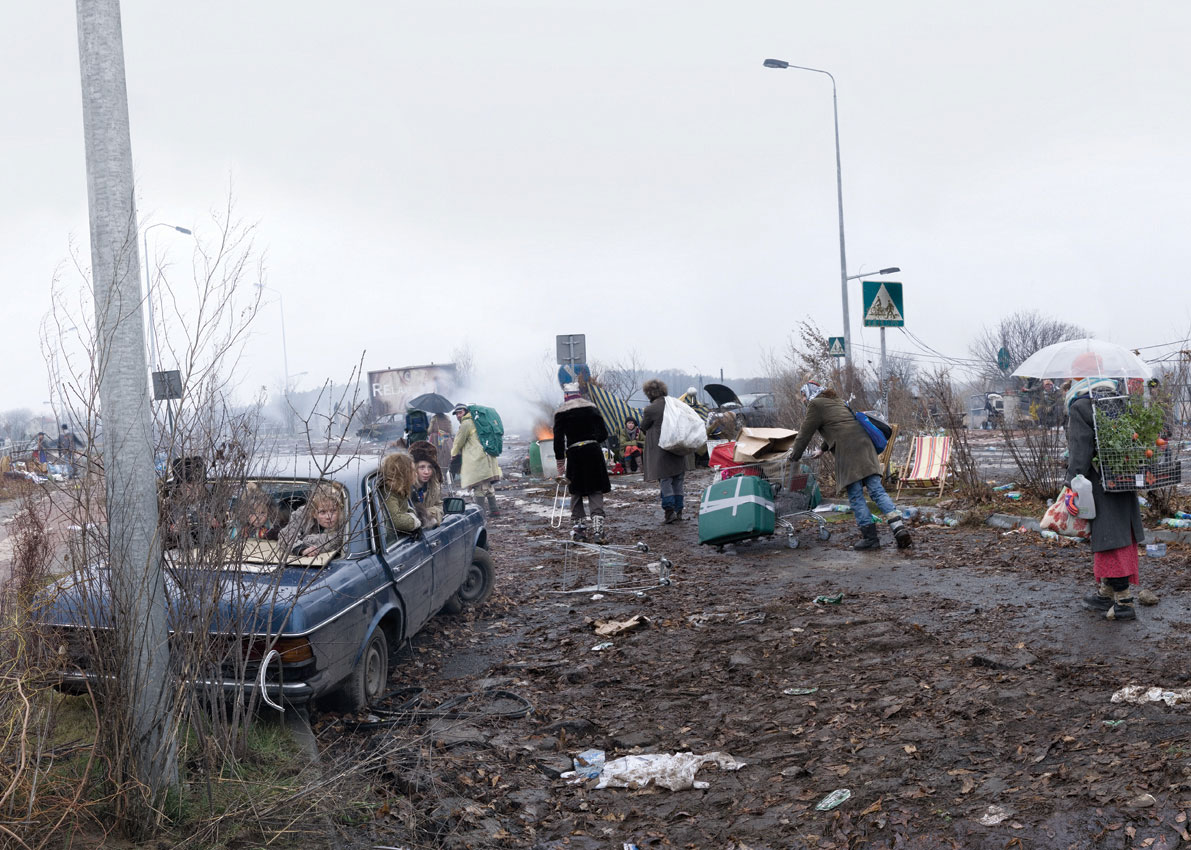
People Leaving the Cities by Zbigniew Libera, 2010

Libera created a series of photographs named Positives (2002-2003), which includes photos of Wehrmacht soldiers destroying a border barrier in Gdańsk in 1939, a Vietnamese girl escaping Trảng Bàng during the Vietnam War in 1972, and prisoners of a liberated concentration camp. The Positives series was another attempt for Libera to comment on trauma, in a similar vein as his videography. Mistrzowie (2004; English: Masters) is another photography series by Libera that captures sections of published newspapers and magazines that feature interviews with other artists in his league. Influenced by early twentieth-century French writer Raymond Roussel, La Vue (2004-2006) is a photography series taken of the spaces between glossy magazine pages.

=== Other works ===
In 1995, Libera released a piece titled Kens Aunt, consistent of twenty-five copies of a Barbie box-like packaging design and bubble wrap. It was purchased and displayed by the Museum of Contemporary Art in Chicago. Similar to Kens Aunt, Libera created another four-box set titled Eroica, which featured tiny female figures based on models of slaves.
