= Georg Schöllhammer =

Austrian curator, writer and editor (born 1958)

Georg Schöllhammer (born 1958) is an Austrian curator, writer and editor. He is one of the founders and the editor in chief of the influential art magazine Springerin based in Vienna and was the initiator, head and editor in chief of the Documenta 12 Magazines.

Schöllhammer was born in Linz, Austria. He studied architecture, art history and philosophy. Between 1988 and 1994, he was the editor for fine arts of the newspaper Der Standard. From 1992 on, he was visiting professor for Theory of Contemporary Art at the University of Arts and Industrial Design Linz. He published extensively on fine arts, architecture and art theory. He gave lectures and held seminars at various universities and colleges around the world and he was curator for the international cooperative project "translocatione new media_art". He co-curated the festival "du bist die welt" at the annual Vienna Festival in 2001, and exhibitions in Yerevan, Bucharest, and Sofia.
