= Grace Morley =

American museologist (1900–1985)

1st Director of the San Francisco Museum of Art
- In office 1935 – July 1958

1st Director of the National Museum of India
- In office August 8, 1960 – 1966

Personal details
- Born: Grace Louise McCann; November 3, 1900 Berkeley, California, U.S.
- Died: January 8, 1985 (aged 84) New Delhi, India
- Spouse(s): S. Griswold Morley (m. 1933–?; div.)
- Education: University of California, Berkeley (MA), University of Paris (PhD)
- Occupation: Art historian, curator, museologist

Grace Louise McCann Morley (née Grace Louise McCann; November 3, 1900 – January 8, 1985) was an American art historian, curator and museologist of global influence. She was the first director of the San Francisco Museum of Modern Art (formerly the San Francisco Museum of Art) and held the position for 23 years starting in 1935. In an interview with Thomas Tibbs, she is credited with being a major force in encouraging young American artists. The government of India awarded her the Padma Bhushan, its third highest civilian award, in 1982.

== Early life and education ==
Grace Louise McCann was born in 1900, in Berkeley, California, US. She had health issues that isolated her from other children and led her parents to try different local climate zones, settling in St. Helena, California, in 1909, where she finally started school by age 10. She excelled in school and was an exceptional student. Her high school, St. Helena High School, did not offer French classes, therefore, she decided to teach herself French. She also developed an early interest in art history, but when she studied at the University of California, Berkeley, there were virtually no classes in the subject, so she majored in French and Greek. In 1923, she wrote her master's thesis at UC Berkeley in French on the poetics of Aristotle.

Morley studied French literature at University of California, Berkeley, receiving a master's degree in 1923, and earned a doctorate in art and literature from the University of Paris in 1926. In 1929 she attended a Harvard University summer session in art history connected with the Fogg Art Museum.

== Career ==
=== Cincinnati ===
From 1927 to 1930 she taught advanced French at Goucher College in Towson, Maryland. Her experience at Harvard University led to her hiring as general curator at the Cincinnati Museum of Art in 1930, working under museum director Walter Siple.

=== San Francisco ===
In December 1934, she was hired as the curator of the San Francisco Museum of Modern Art, slated to open in early 1935. Eventually her title changed to director. In her first years at the museum, she organized exhibitions dedicated to Paul Cézanne, Paul Gauguin, and Henri Matisse. By the 1940s and '50s she was holding 100 shows per year, many from the New York MoMA and Peggy Guggenheim's gallery in Manhattan. She also established the first gallery tours for any museum in the West as well as art history courses, a public art library, an art rental gallery, the first film program at an American museum—"Art in Cinema"—, and the television series Art in Your Life.

She was second vice-president, American Federation of Arts, 1939; counsellor for arts at the Bureau of Inter-American Affairs, 1941; a member of the Committee of the Fine Arts Buildings of the Golden Gate International Exposition in San Francisco, and director of Pacific House 1940, a member of the Committee of Experts on the Arts, State Department, 1940–1945.

Between 1946 and 1949, she took leave from the San Francisco Museum of Art, and became consultant for museums at UNESCO Preparatory Commission in Germany, and then as the head of its Museums Division as a consultant with French, American, and British authorities. She helped with theft and the return of multiple artworks. In 1949, she returned to San Francisco as a popular art star. Due to her fame and travels to Brazil, Chile, and Greece, the San Francisco Museum of Art became very well known across the world.

Morley was outspoken about the gender discrepancies within the field of museum studies, and in 1955 she published an interview on the subject.

However, in 1958, she decided to leave San Francisco along with her ties to the museum due to disagreements with the board of directors. "After being forced to leave S.F. in 1958, she cut off ties with most of her friends and colleagues in the Bay Area, which is one reason her memory has been somewhat buried", Morley scholar Kristy Phillips wrote in a 2006 email on ArtsJournal.com. "She felt betrayed here by the museum and its trustees and at one point declared that she wanted to forget S.F. completely."

Time magazine wrote about her in her twentieth year with the museum, and again on her resignation in 1958. Her resignation was also published in the San Francisco Examiner.

=== New Delhi ===
In 1959, she served as the assistant director of the Guggenheim Museum before she decided to move to India. She moved to New Delhi, India in 1960, and remained there until her death. She was the founder director of the National Museum of India in New Delhi starting on August 8, 1960, and remained at the role until 1966. In India, under the supervision of Prime Minister Jawawarlal Nehru she opened the country's first major art museum. She was awarded the Padma Bhushan award by the Indian government, which is given to civilians who have contributed greatly in a specific line of work that is valued in India. In her case, it was due to her knowledge in art history and expertise on museums.

She was active in the International Council of Museums (ICOM), and was the head of the ICOM Regional Agency for South and South-East Asia from 1967 to 1978. She authored a number of articles on contemporary art, and on Latin American civilizations, and was the subject of a book edited by Dipa Chaudhuri.

== Personal life and death ==
In June 1933, she married S. Griswold Morley (1878–1970), a professor of Spanish and Portuguese at UC Berkeley. The marriage did not last long (it became clear that she was a lesbian), but it positioned her when the San Francisco Museum of Art board was looking for a curator.

For the last twenty years of her life, she shared an apartment with a retired Indian Air Force officer and his wife, who became her Indian family, and it was there she died at the age of 84. They believe she had converted to Buddhism at some point in time. At the time of her death Morley's body was cremated in the Indian tradition, and her ashes immersed in a holy river.

== Honors and awards ==
Morley received honorary doctorates from Mills College, Smith College and California College of Arts and Crafts, and she was named a chevalier of the French Legion of Honour.

== Memorials ==
Research fellowships in her honor are awarded by ICOM India Trust each year. The San Francisco Museum of Modern Art has established the Grace McCann Morley Legacy Society for donors who provide for the museum in their estate plans.

In India, the National Museum Institute of the History of Art, Conservation and Museology holds an annual Dr. Grace Morley Memorial Seminar.

Visual artist Andrea Geyer produced an exhibition and performance devoted to Morley's legacy at SFMOMA in 2017.

Berit Potter, assistant professor of art history/museum and gallery practices at California State Polytechnic University, Humboldt, wrote a book about Morley's impact on the development of modern art in California and role as an early advocate for global perspectives in the study of contemporary art called, Widely Curious: Grace McCann Morley and the Origins of Global Contemporary Art.

== Bibliography ==
- Morley, Grace (2005). Indian Sculpture. Roli Books. ISBN 9788174363527.
- Morley, Grace. Karl Morris; Retrospective, American Federation of Arts. 1960.
- Morley, Grace. Museums Today. Baroda: University of Baroda, 1981.
- Morley, Grace. Art in Museums. Baroda: University of Baroda, 1963.
- Morley, Grace, and Suzanne B. Reiss. Art, Artists, Museums, and the San Francisco Museum of Art; Oral History Interview. Berkeley: University of California, Bancroft Library, Regional Oral History Office, 1960.
