= León Ferrari =

Argentine contemporary conceptual artist

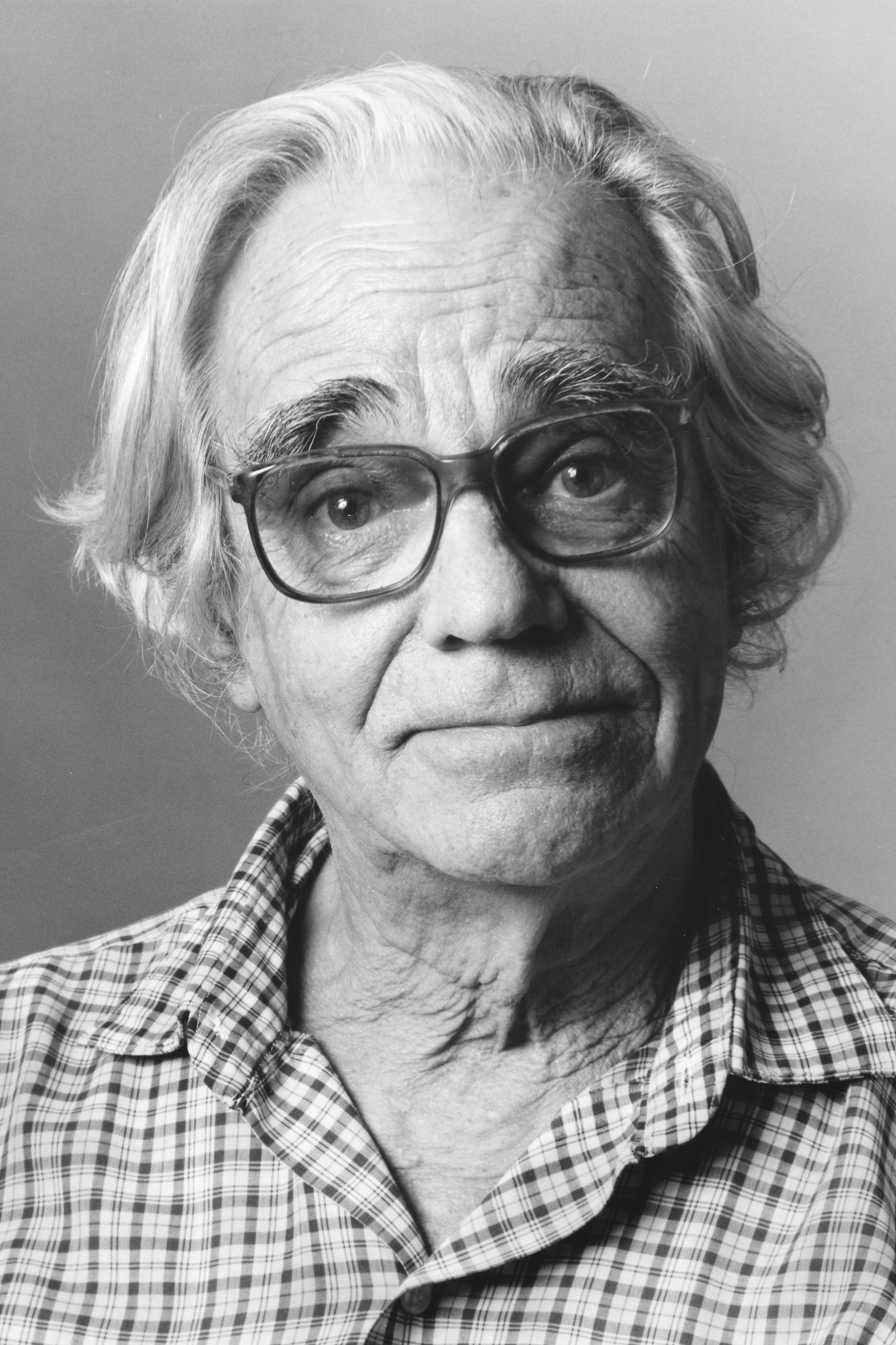
- Born: September 3, 1920; Buenos Aires, Argentina
- Died: July 25, 2013 (aged 92); Buenos Aires, Argentina
- Known for: Plastic arts
- Spouse: Alicia Bs Castro (m. 1946)
- Awards: São Paulo Association of Art Critics Award (1983); Leone D'Oro, Venice Biennale (2007); Diamond Konex Award for Visual Arts (2012)

León Ferrari (September 3, 1920 – July 25, 2013) was an Argentine contemporary conceptual artist. During his extended art career (1954-2013), his artworks often protested the Argentine government, the imperialist west, and the Church.

Ferrari's protest piece "Western and Christian Civilization", which depicted a near life-size Christ hanging crucified on an American fighter jet, attracted controversy when he created it in 1965, and it has been exhibited many times since. Ferrari caused protests against his work throughout his career, including from Pope Francis when he was still Cardinal Jorge Bergoglio.

== Biography ==
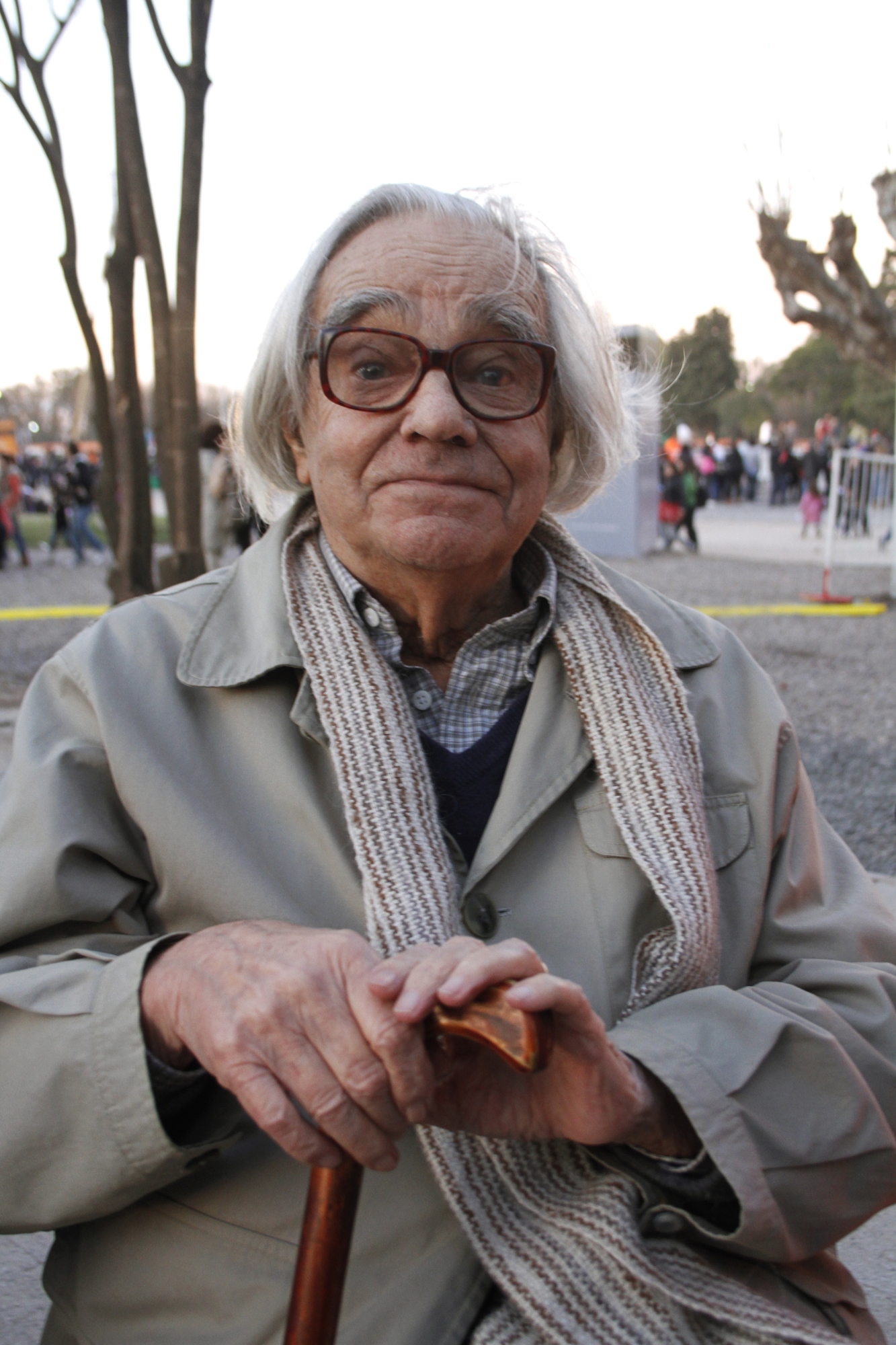
Ferrari in 2011

Ferrari was born September 3, 1920, in Buenos Aires to Susana Celia del Pardo and Augusto César Ferrari; his father was a well-known painter from San Possidonio, Italy. As a young man, Ferrari studied electrical engineering at the University of Buenos Aires. Ferrari worked as an engineer into his thirties. In 1946, Ferrari married Alicia Barros Castro and the three went on to have three children: Marialí, Pablo, and Ariel. He began casually making art during that same year. In 1952, Ferrari moved to Italy with his family because his daughter, Marialí, was fighting tuberculosis and he wanted her to have access to high quality medical care.

Almost by chance, he began working with clay and started dedicating substantial time to ceramic artwork in 1954. His first major solo exhibition took place in Milan in 1955. That same year of 1955, he moved back to Buenos Aires. With his return to Argentina, Ferrari began to explore sculpture using different mediums including, wood, plaster, and cement, and, in the 1959, wire. 1962 marked Ferrari's first foray into paper and ink artwork. From 1963 on, Ferrari used words and handwriting heavily in many of his works. He began using plastics and objects in 1964, marking the beginning of his collages that he would use for the rest of his career.

In 1976, Ferrari took his family to São Paulo, Brazil, entering into a period of exile, due to threats from the Argentine dictatorship of the time. However, just after he left, Ferrari's son Ariel, who had decided to stay in Argentina, was kidnapped by the dictatorship. The last letter the Ferrari family received from their son came in February 1977. In 1978 they received word that he had been found dead February 26, 1977. During his time in exile, Ferrari explored new forms of art, including mail art, photocopying, lithography, and he even wrote some books.

Ferrari returned to Argentina in 1991, continuing to make art all the while. In 2008, he created the Augusto (his father) and León Ferrari Foundation which keeps the memory of the artist alive. He died on July 25, 2013, at the age of 92. He is buried at La Chacarita Cemetery.

== Career ==
=== Overview ===
Ferrari began his career by making small drawings, but primarily did sculptures until 1962, when he began to employ his life-long motif of language and scratchy, calligraphic writing. Ferrari created protest art using collage, photocopying and sculpture in wood, plaster, wire and ceramics. He often used text, especially newspaper clippings or poetry, particularly in his pieces protesting the Church and the Argentine government. His art often dealt with the subject of political power and religion. Some of his most controversial images depicted saints, the Virgin Mary, and Jesus found in toasters or microwaves, on nude figures, or being defecated on by live birds. He deals with issues of United States foreign policy with the Vietnam War in his best-known work, La civilización occidental y cristiana (Western-Christian Civilization, 1965). In this work, Christ appears crucified on a fighter plane, as a symbolic protest against the Vietnam War and Western Imperialism ().

=== Early works (1955–1964) ===
Ferrari took up painting in 1946, then began seriously making art in 1954. Much of his early work is sculpting, often ceramic or made of cement. His early works included pottery and sculpture, with deeply abstract roots. (See his work "Mujer" from 1960 for an example.) In 1954 he was invited to participate in the 1954 X Triennale by Lucio Fontana, then, in 1955, he held his first solo exhibition in Milan. His sculptures during this time were abstract, mostly figurative, without the veiled (or unveiled) political messages that marked much of his later work. Beginning in 1959, he started sculpting using other mediums such as wire and carved wood. Ferrari exhibited his first wire sculpture in 1961. He began to draw in March 1962, opening a period of language and word-based art that would continue for the rest of his career. He began collage and object work in 1964.

=== Language and writing (1962 and on) ===
Starting in 1962, Ferrari began to use language and letters as a common theme in many artworks. Scholars point to multiple influences as explanations for Ferrari's interest in words. One reason is that his young daughter lost her ability to hear due to meningitis and had to be taught language differently by her parents. Another reason is that Argentine political thought within the public sphere was largely controlled by a corrupt media at this time, so Ferrari wanted to present words through art as a different medium for language in protest against the media. Ferrari's reasoning for using this medium has also been said to "question the distinction between art and language—between pure visuality and codified information, and between graphic gesture and calligraphy."

Ferrari did not always use language in intelligible ways. For instance, he would sometimes just use lines and letters to create the image of text, as in his piece Reflections from 1963-64. Another famous example of his unintelligible writing is Ferrari's famous piece Carta a un general (Letter to a General). This piece is written in a very loose, calligraphic style that does not allow the viewer to clearly read the message. This piece represented Ferrari's thoughts that effective communication with a political power (such as a dictatorial general) is impossible.

However, when he did write intelligibly, it was often in essay, letter, or poetic forms, transcribing his thoughts on politics, current events, or his own artwork. These pieces were still written in a sloppy, calligraphic style, however one would be able to make out the words much more clearly. An example of this is the piece titled Cuadro escrito that he made in which he responds to the critiques of his exhibit at the Torcuato di Tella Institute National Prize exhibition in 1965.

=== Political activism in Argentina in the 1960s ===
==== "Western and Christian Civilization" ====
In 1965, Ferrari submitted four artworks for the National Prize of Torcuato di Tella Institute. Each piece had religious themes, but one piece stuck out among the rest: Ferrari's famous La Civilización Occidental y Cristiana (Western and Christian Civilization) – a near life-size Christ hanging crucified on an American F-105 fighter jet. The director of Center of Visual Art for the institute, Jorge Romero Brest, told Ferrari to remove this famous work or he would not be allowed to participate. Unlike the contrary manner in which he defended his artworks later in life, Ferrari agreed and withheld the work from the exhibition. Despite his removal of the provocative piece, art critics still attacked Ferrari for the way his other pieces critiqued Christianity. He responded by writing a letter in handwritten, sketch-like form, questioning his critics' condemnation of his own deeply critical art. This responsive art piece is titled Cuadro escrito. The controversy surrounding Western and Christian Civilization manifested Ferrari's central role in Argentina's political protest art.

==== Tucumán Arde ====
One of Ferrari's most prolific protests within the Argentine art world was his participation in Tucumán Arde. Tucumán Arde was a series of art shows put on by a collection of Argentine artists whose aim was to expose the Argentine government's wrongdoings in Tucumán, Argentina. The exhibitions displayed photographs, articles, and short videos collected by the group of artists which showed the hardships and economic distress of the people living in Tucumán. As these exhibits were an exposure of the corrupt government, attacking the powerful and dangerous Argentine dictatorship of the time, many of the artists who helped with Tucumán Arde remained in the background, not wanting to place a target on their back by proclaiming participation in the events.

=== Period of abstention from art (c. 1972–1976) ===
After playing such a central role in heated, highly politicized protest art, Ferrari took a hiatus from art-making. Although he may have been making art during these years, his works were not appearing in the public sphere. In addition to this, Ferrari had been heavily involved in the political protest scene of Argentina in the 1960s. He may have made the decision to lie low for a while following highly dynamic period of protest, which included his participation in Tucumán Arde. In 1976, Ferrari departed the country and entered a period of exile in São Paulo, Brazil.

=== Works of the 1980s ===
==== Wire sculpture (late 1970s and 1980s) ====
Ferrari made his first wire sculpture in 1961. He drew on his knowledge of metals from his work as an engineer, making use metals such as steel, bronze, copper, silver, palladium, tantalum, and gold. Although he made wire sculptures in the 1960s and early 1970s, they were not his focus. However, he returned to the medium in the late 1970s with works like Prisma, Maqueta, and Planeta. Art scholars suggest that Ferrari's sculptures represent the way many small pieces (individual wires, for instance) can come together to create a stronger function as a whole (the full sculpture).

==== Instrument sculpture (1981) ====
In the 1980s, Ferrari discovered that many of his wire sculptures would hum or create musical tones when the wind was allowed to blow through them. In conjunction with this theme of musical tones, Ferrari created a series of sculptures with instruments embedded in them which could be played. In 1981, he held an exhibition called "Las 14 Noches de Performance" (The 14 Nights of Performance) in which he played the instruments. These sculptures allowed Ferrari to play into the idea of his artwork "making noise" in the world.

==== Bird defecation (1985) ====
Starting in 1985, Ferrari created works of art where Christian images (mainly Michaelangelo's The Last Judgment) were placed below bird cages and birds (including pigeons, goldfinches, canaries, and chickens) were allowed to defecate on the images. The idea behind these artworks was fairly overt: Ferrari wanted to show that the ideas in the Christian images were "shit." Ferrari held exhibitions of this bird display in galleries around the world, first at the São Paulo Museum of Modern Art, then later in other cities, including Buenos Aires and New York.

=== Heliografías (1980–1987) ===
Following a period of mostly unintelligible, scratchy drawing, Ferrari entered a period of print-making, creating his famous series known as "Heliografías". These works were sketches and designs for absurd urban plans, including city plans, freeway designs, neighborhood maps, furniture layouts, and other, more simplistic patterns. Ferrari is quoted explaining these Heliograph artworks: "These works express the absurdity of contemporary society, that sort of daily madness necessary for everything to look normal." Along with this concept of absurdity, scholars suggest Ferrari desired to point out the dangers of blindly following a pattern or movement. He created prints where small figures were trapped inside a closed loop, moving forward in the loop but never moving out. With this idea of blindly choosing uniformity, Ferrari hoped to draw ties to the way many Argentines simply ambivalently allowed injustice to continue with their blind adherence to the status quo. Occasionally within these prints, Ferrari would switch the pattern, such as in his piece Adulterio (Adultery), where a white king breaks the pattern and sleeps with a black queen. This was meant just to ask the question: what if we break the pattern?

=== Nudity and the human body 1980s and 90s ===
==== Braille works (1997) ====
In 1997, Ferrari created two series using braille. In the first, he took lines from the poems and stories of famous Argentine writer Jorge Luis Borges, and emboss the words in Braille on erotic or nude photographs. In the second series, Ferrari used verses of scripture embossed in braille. In both cases, the idea was to force viewers to touch or, as Ferrari often described, "caress" the naked bodies depicted in the prints in order to understand the words written on the image. An example of this is Ferrari's piece titled La Serpiente in which a Japanese stamp has been reprinted, depicting a couple engaged in sex. The words "la serpiente me engaño y comí," which is Genesis 3:13 (translated: "the serpent deceived me, and I ate"), are embossed in braille over the area in the image where the couples' genitals come together. Ferrari created these artworks often as a way to push back against the Church's demonization of women, sexuality, and often of homosexuality.

==== Mannequins (1994) ====
In 1994, Ferrari held an exhibition Buenos Aires titled, "Cristos y Maniquíes" or "Christs and Mannequins". This gallery included some nude prints and paintings embossed with braille (as discussed above), but also included another form of bodily art. Ferrari took mannequins and with some, pasted Christian images over the top, while with others, he wrote in his classic scratchy, calligraphic style. The mannequins he used did not have full arms, legs, or heads, but did have accentuated curves and a clear sexualized posture. For one of these image-covered mannequins, titled Devoción, he used many different Christian images, including Jesus' miracles, martyrdoms of saints, and the birth of Christ, with a central figure was the Virgin Mary. The goal for these mannequins was to "dress" the nude body with these Christian images, while also juxtapose the virginity of Mary with the sexuality and nudity of the female body. Another mannequin figure titled Dueteronomio was a similarly sexualized, limbless mannequin, this time covered with sections from the Book of Deuteronomy, written in Ferrari's calligraphic style. The idea Ferrari is playing with here is that of the "clothing of grace" that covered Adam and Eve in the Garden of Eden, withholding the shame that their nudity would later bring. However, instead of these words and images representing that "clothing of grace", Ferrari invites the reader to think of nudity in positive terms, rather than the typically negative, shameful way that he posits to Christian thought on nudity. If nudity is positive here, then the scriptures and images withhold the natural sexuality of the body. Christianity becomes an impediment to the natural sexuality which exudes from the body.

=== Nunca Mas for Pagina/12 (1995) ===
In 1995, Ferrari was invited to submit images for the left-leaning Argentine newspaper Página/12 as a part of the magazines republishing of the 1984 government project Nunca Mas, aimed at uncovering the truth behind Argentine Desaparecidos ("disappearances") in the 1960–1980s. In his contributions, Ferrari returned to a much harsher, more overtly political-critical approach in his art. His works often juxtaposed images of Argentine people or political figures (Videla and Agosti for instance) next to figures of Adolf Hitler and Nazi Germany. Ferrari also mixed in Christian images and themes of Hell, Satan, and Damnation. A specific example is when Ferrari overlaid the Nazi swastika on a photo of the entrance sign of the Colegio Militar de la Nación, where Argentine officers received training. Critics, including political figures such as Ernesto Juan Bossi, wrote Página/12 to complain. Ferrari responded to these critics swiftly and sharply, saying that he was not the one utilizing Nazi ideas (but in fact his critics were). Ferrari's controversial images were simply meant to invite viewers to contemplate how Argentine political regimes and Nazi Germany were different, or how the might in fact be similar.

=== Christian plastic works ===
In the early 2000s, Ferrari exhibited a series of artworks using small, plastic figures of Christian figures, including Jesus, the Virgin Mary, and various Saints. He placed these figurines inside what he deemed "hot situations" including microwaves, blenders, and frying pans.

== Controversy ==
=== Original publication of "Western and Christian Civilization" ===
See the section above, titled "Western and Christian Civilization".

=== Letters to the Pope: 1997 and 2001 ===
In 1997, Ferrari founded a group called CIHABAPAI (Club of the Impious, Heretics, Apostates, Blasphemers, Atheists, Pagans, Agnostics and Infidels). On Christmas day, 1997 Ferrari, in conjunction with the CIHABAPAI, sent a letter to the Pope John Paul II, asking him to remove the doctrine of Final Judgement from Catholic theology. In his letter, he pointed out contradictions between Catholic thought and Catholic dogma, questioned ideas about forgiveness, and called out for their complacency in the egregious human rights violations occurring in Argentina in the latter half of the 1950s.

In 2001, the group sent another letter calling for the removal of the concept of Hell.

=== Intervention of the Church (2000) ===
In 2000, Ferrari held an exhibition called "Infiernos e Idolatías" (Infernos and Idolatries) at the Cultural Center of Buenos Aires. Ferrari presented artworks concerning Last Judgment and other Christian figures. He included his series of birds defecating on Christian images, as well as newer pieces where plastic saints were placed inside various cooking devices such as toaster, pans, and microwaves. The exhibition created protests by dedicated Catholics, monks and nuns. This turned into protesters throwing trash and tear-gas grenades into the museum.

=== Intervention of the Church and Pope (2004) ===
His work was again the subject of controversy when in 2004, a retrospective of his works at the Palais de Glace exhibition hall in Recoleta, Buenos Aires, was forced to close. 70,000 people came to the exhibition, including a few attendees who attacked and destroyed some of the artworks. Soon after, a team of Catholic lawyers demanded that the exhibit be closed. Ferrari rebutted the critiques questioning how Christians could spend 2,000 years condemning the suffering of Jesus at the crucifixion, while simultaneously ignoring and justifying millions of the world's poor and marginalized. A judge finally shut down the exhibit when Cardinal Jorge Bergoglio (later Pope Francis), then the Archbishop of Buenos Aires, declared the works of art blasphemous, and an announcement was made in every church in the Diocese of Buenos Aires. The city government appealed the decision and the gallery was reopened. Ferrari made his final move by publicly thanking the cardinal for the free advertisement of his exhibition whose numbers of visitors continued to increase.

== Famous works ==
=== Carta a un General (1963) ===
Carta a un General (Letter to a General) came out of Ferrari's early 1960s work with language and letters. This artwork is done on a 31.1" by 48.1" piece of paper in pen with black ink. The work is one of Ferrari's earliest political protest piece. It carries a simple idea: by using language and letters that are all but unintelligible, Ferrari is representing the inability to communicate. In the work's title, Ferrari only specifies a "General," which, given the time frame, could be understood to be a leader in one of Argentina's oppressive regimes of the 1950s and 60s. So, Ferrari is showing that communication with leaders like this is impossible. Furthermore, by using letters that one cannot read, Ferrari can "say" whatever he wants without fear of repercussion, as no one will be able to read it. Many years later, he is quoted talking about this piece: "It is difficult to write a 'logical' letter to a general. A letter that says things, that isn't just insulting, that is 'artistic,' The incomprehensibility of these letters is more than a protection from cencorship [sic?], it reflects an inability to write a letter like that of Rodolfo Walsh. That is a letter. What I did was an imitation of a letter, or a hidden letter, which might make on wonder, 'Does this mean something or not?'"

=== La Civilización Occidental y Cristiana (1965) ===
This work, titled La Civilización Occidental y Cristiana (Western and Christian Civilization) was a nearly life-sized plastic figure of Jesus hanging crucified on a 6-foot plastic American fighter with its nose pointed toward the ground. This is Ferrari's most famous work and has been displayed throughout the world countless times. In this artwork, Ferrari is presenting a contradiction: on one hand, Christians believe in a religion that revolves around Jesus' idea that people ought to love one another and not kill each other, while on the other hand, many Christians do this anyway, even using Christianity to justify war. Furthermore, by using an American plane, Ferrari is questioning the American government's imperialism, specifically within the context of the Vietnam War. As a final thought, when people come out to protest the artwork itself, one must ask the question: why are there vehement protests against an artwork while Christians sit idly and allow suffering to occur daily with no protest at all? Later, Tatxo Benet added it to his Censored Art Collection. It is displayed at the Museu de l'Art Prohibit in Barcelona, Spain.

=== La Planeta (1979) ===
La Planeta (Planet) comes from Ferrari's return to wire sculpture in the 1970-80s. This artwork is enormous, stretching 51 inches in diameter, and made of stainless steel. The steel wires seem to protrude in every direction, creating a sphere of smaller, straight wires. The sculpture is so large that when it was first displayed, the door to the gallery had to be broken in order to fit the piece inside. When the wind blew through this sculpture, moving it even a little, the rubbing of the steel wires caused a low, humming tone which many find musical. This piece was part of a series Ferrari made which had a goal of "inverting the pendulum".

=== Bairro (Neighborhood) (1980) ===
This work is from Ferrari's series titled "Heliografías" from the 1980s. The series includes many pieces, primarily made with paper and Diazotype. The series depicted many subjects, but all with recurring themes. The basic theme was a repetitive, closed loop of some sort, whether it be a road, street layout, room design, furniture order, or simply patterned object. Bairro is a fairly typical piece from the series. It was originally made in 1980 using diazotype, and depicts a large and complex layout of streets, buildings, parks, squares, and houses. The idea behind this piece, as well as many others from "Heliografías" is that he is questioning "the most diverse systems of order in our world and their sociocultural demands for territory - whether it is the church, the state, or architecture."

=== Last Judgement (1985) ===
One of Ferrari's most provocative works, Last Judgement was a deeply conceptual piece requiring not the participation of the view, but of another party. Ferrari repeated this type of piece many times using various images of Last Judgment, but for this specific piece he used Michelangelo's The Last Judgement. He placed a print of the famous fresco beneath a birdcage and simply allowed the birds to defecate all over the piece. The idea behind this work was really very simple: the Last Judgement is "shit."

== Legacy and awards ==
Those who knew Ferrari seem to always remember his playful, youthful spirit. Into his old age, he was known for never going with the flow, and always remaining energetic and eager to fight against the injustices of the world. Many critiqued him for being too political in his artwork, to which Ferrari famously responded: "The only thing I ask of art is that it helps me express what I think as clearly as possible, to invent visual and critical signs that let me condemn more efficiently the barbarism of the West," he wrote in 1965. "Someone could possibly prove to me that this is not art. I would have no problem with it, I would not change paths, I would simply change its name, crossing out art and calling it politics, corrosive criticism, anything at all, really." Although Ferrari spent his life fighting critics with sharp and caustic responses, images, and ideas, Ferrari never lost his good humor. He was admired and loved by many around him.

He earned among many awards and recognitions, including the São Paulo Association of Art Critics Award for Best Art Exhibition of 1983, a Guggenheim Fellowship in 1995, the Leone D'Oro at the Venice Biennale in 2007, and in 2012, The Konex Foundation in Argentina granted him the Diamond Konex Award for Visual Arts, naming him the most important visual artist in Argentina over the last decade.

== Exhibitions ==
1. National Prize of Torcuato di Tella Institute in Buenos Aires (1965)
2. Tucumán Arde in multiple cities in Argentina (1968)
3. Museum of Modern Art in São Paulo (1980)
4. "Las 14 Noches de Performance" – São Paulo (1981)
5. Centro Cultural in Recoleta, Buenos Aires (2004-2005)
6. Pinacoteca do Estado in São Paulo (2006)
7. Documenta 12 in Kassel, Germany (2007)
8. 52nd Venice Biennale at "Arsenale: Corderie and Artiglierie Italian Pavilion at the Giardiniin in Venice (2007)
9. "Tangled Alphabets" with artist Mira Schendel at the Museum of Modern Art in New York City (2009)
10. "León Ferrari" at Rencontres d'Arles Festival, in Arles, France (2019)
