= The Global Contemporary: Art Worlds after 1989 =

2011 exhibition

The Global Contemporary: Art Worlds after 1989 was an exhibition held at the ZKM | Center for Art and Media Karlsruhe in 2011–2012. This exhibition proposed theory that global art as a distinct paradigm shift that develops in the post-1989 period and the start of no longer thinking: to not think about the West as the single model to be applied worldwide.
