= Kirill Preobrazhenskiy =

Russian artist

Kirill Preobrazhenskiy (born 1970 in Moscow, Soviet Union) is a Russian artist, participant of Documenta 12. Works mainly with video and installations.

With his video and installations Kirill researches theory of media, semiotics and pop-culture and its relation to everyday reality. Being personally interested and involved in social spheres, from techno-culture to contemporary forms of political protests, Kirill addresses abstract ideas as if they were material and can be expressed aesthetically.

One of the pioneers of video art in Russia.

== Biography ==
From 1990 to 1993 took part in activities of group Van Gogh TV, for example in project Piazza Virtuale, at Documenta 9 in 1992. Was a part of Out-Governmental Control Commission Founded label VIDIOT. Worked as a professor of New Media faculty in The Rodchenko Moscow School of Photography and Multimedia, currently works in HSE Art and Design School. Founded "Cheremushki apartment gallery" in his own flat.

== Selected exhibitions ==
- 1991 – "He" (with A. Belyaev). School Gallery, Moscow.
- 1992 – "He" (with A. Belyaev). Museum of Paleontology, Moscow.
- 1994 – "JU-87" (with A. Belyaev). Regina Gallery, Moscow.
- 1994 – "Laboratory of frozen subsoil". Free Academy, Moscow
- 1997 – "Platinum century. Fancy-dress party" (with A. Belyaev), Center of contemporary art, Moscow.
- 2001 – "Subject and power. Lyrical voice", Art-Moscow, Moscow.
- 2003 – "Plan №9" (with A.Smirnsky), XL-gallery, Moscow
- 2006 – "Love songs" (with S.Glushkova), Paperworks Gallery, Moscow
- 2006 – "Re-action" (with Radek Community), Play-gallery for still and motion pictures, Berlin
- 2002/07/09 – "ISM I, II, III" ("Incredible Strange Museum"), XL-gallery, Moscow; Central House of Artist, Moscow
- 2007 – History of Russian Videoart. Vol.1, Moscow Museum of Modern Art, Moscow
- 2007 – "Documenta 12", Kassel
- 2007 – Ottobre. Uscita, Desiderio e Memoria, Artra, Milan
- 2008 – Industrial Lies, Dispari & Dispari Project, Reggio Emilia
- 2009 – History of Russian Videoart. Vol.2, Moscow Museum of Modern Art, Moscow
- 2010 – Objects in Mirror Are Closer than They Appear: About videoart in Russia, Futura, Prague
- 2010 — History of Russian Videoart. Vol.3, Moscow Museum of Modern Art, Moscow
