= Harmon Wray =

American activist and author (1946–2007)

Harmon L. Wray, Jr.
- Born: November 10, 1946; Memphis, Tennessee, U.S.
- Died: July 24, 2007 (aged 60); Nashville, Tennessee, U.S.
- Education: Rhodes College; Duke University Divinity School; Vanderbilt University Divinity School
- Occupations: Activist, author

Harmon Lee Wray Jr. (November 10, 1946 - July 24, 2007) was an American activist and author, based in Tennessee, who supported human rights for the poor, abolition of the death penalty, and prison reform. He advocated that Christians had a moral obligation to try to keep people out of prison, and persisted with his efforts of reform during decades of rising rates of incarceration in the United States, especially of minorities.

== Early life ==
Wray was born on November 10, 1946. He grew up in a working-class family in Memphis, Tennessee, where he was raised as a Baptist. He later joined the United Methodist Church.

Wray graduated from Rhodes College in 1968. He earned a master's degree from the Duke University Divinity School in 1970. He later attended graduate school at the Vanderbilt University Divinity School but never completed his PhD. By 1998, he had been enrolled for 16 years.

== Career ==
Wray taught classes on prison ministry at the Vanderbilt Divinity School in Nashville in the 1970s. In 1978, he argued that, "Too often, people in the free world have a tendency to shy away from dealing with crime and with people in our society who don't fit in." He believed that Christians especially had a duty to keep people out of prison. In the decades since, the rates of incarceration increased dramatically nationwide, especially for minorities, both because of implementation of the war on drugs and more severe sentencing guidelines.

In 1995, Wray was hired by the United Methodist Church as Coordinator for Ministries with the Poor and Marginalized. His role was to raise awareness about poverty in Middle Tennessee. Wray gave lectures about human rights for the poor at the Vanderbilt Divinity School and the West End United Methodist Church in the late 1990s.

Wray advocated abolition of the death penalty and reform of excessively punitive sentencing and prison conditions. He participated in the Tennessee Coalition to Abolish State Killing and the Restorative Justice Coalition of Tennessee. He worked with the Southern Prison Ministry, Project Return, and the Tennessee Association of Criminal Defense Lawyers. He also taught at the Riverbend Maximum Security Institution in Nashville.

In another means of reaching people, he co-authored two published books on prison reform. According to his obituary in The Tennessean, Wray believed America's prison system "penalizes people who can't afford lawyers and lets respectable criminals get away."

== Death ==
Wray died of a stroke on July 24, 2007, in Nashville, Tennessee. His funeral was held at the Belmont United Methodist Church.

== Selected works ==
- Wray, Harmon (1989). "Cells for Sale". Southern Changes. 8 (3): 3–6. Archived from the original on 2016-02-01.
- Wray, Harmon; Hutchison, Peggy (2002). Restorative Justice: Moving Beyond Punishment. New York: General Board of Global Ministries, the United Methodist Church. ISBN 9781890569341. OCLC 50796239.
- Magnani, Laura; Wray, Harmon L. (2006). Beyond Prisons: A New Interfaith Paradigm for our Failed Prison System. Minneapolis, Minnesota: Fortress. ISBN 9780800638320. OCLC 805054899.
