= Sakarin Krue-On =

Thai artist (born 1965)

Sakarin Krue-On (January 7, 1965) is a contemporary Thai visual artist. His works are often site-specific installations with traditional Thai cultural influences. Krue-On is an art instructor, an advisor for postgraduate students, and the Associate Dean of the Faculty of Painting, Sculpture and Graphic Arts at Silpakorn University. Krue-On resides and works in the metropolitan area of Bangkok, although his projects and exhibitions frequently take him out of Thailand.

== Early life and education ==
Krue-On was born in Mae Hong Son, a northwestern Thai province. He earned his Bachelor of Fine Arts degree at Silpakorn University in 1989, under the supervision of Chalood Nimsamer.

== Career ==
Krue-On has created a number of solo works, in addition to collaborating with other artists and presenting exhibitions at galleries and institutions. He specializes in site-specific installations, and sometimes works with local communities to produce his works. His pieces are often sculptural, but he also uses video and paintings. His work highlights the virtues of traditional Thai culture, such as rice farming practices, temple paintings, and Buddhist imagery, while blending Western and local techniques of printmaking, drawing, sculpting, and painting.

In 2009, Krue-On was the recipient of the Silpathorn Award for the category of visual arts, presented by the Office of Contemporary Art and Culture. In 2016 he won Prudential Eye Lifetime Achievement Award which made in recognition of an artist with an international track record for his or her contributions to the field of Asian contemporary art over the course of a lifetime. In addition to the award, Niru Ratnam, Director of Prudential Eye Programme citing his work as "Whilst other successful Asian artists have sited their practice within a global language of contemporary practice, Krue-On continues to work through nuances specific to Asian cultural identity. For this, and for his international success, he is the winner of the Lifetime Achievement Award at the third Prudential Eye Awards."

== Selected projects ==
=== Temple, 2000 ===
"Temple" was the first solo work by Krue-On, exhibited in a café and gallery, About Art Related Activities (AARA) in Bangkok. In this work, he transformed three different rooms of the gallery area into spaces for meditation, drawing influences from traditional Thai mural painting. The stencils took the forms of traditional Thai (not Buddhist) deities. The designs on the walls were created to fade over time, slowly becoming invisible. The work coincided with an economic crisis in Thailand. The artist created a similar installation, "Nang Fa (Angel)" in 2007 for the Neue Gallerie in Kassel, Germany. The work also contemporarily showed in other famous art galleries, such as in exhibition "Murals" at Fundacio Joan Miró in Barcelona, Spain in 2010 and at Pearl Lam Gallery in Shanghai, China in 2016.

=== Cloud Nine (Lom lom Lang lang), 2005 ===
"Cloud Nine (Lom lom Lang lang)" was installed in the 100 Tonson gallery in Bangkok. The Thai part of the name means "empty hope." The project was a two-room installation; one room featured many white porcelain figurines of street dogs with feathery red angelic wings, devouring a banquet. The second room displayed video footage of real puppies in feeding from their mother. The work was installed again in 2012 as part of exhibition " Panorama: Recent Art from Contemporary Asia" at Singapore Art Museum, Singapore. In 2013 the work was brought to Hong Kong Art Basel by 100Tonson gallery and was well received as one of the selected high-light.

=== Documenta 12, 2007 Terraced Rice Field Art Project ===
"Terraced Rice Field" was created for Documenta 12 outside of the Schloss Wilhelmshöhe museum building. With the help of local volunteers, Krue-On created a functioning terraced rice field on the side of the nearby hill. According to the 'Europe Grand Tour of Contemporary Art' an article by Julia Chaplin in on May 28, 2007, New York Times the 'Terraced Rice Field Art Project' was written about as following

"...The show - 120 artists from the Congo to Australia - takes an outsider's view of the commercial art world. To keep an element of surprise, Documenta does not reveal the list of artists until the final hour. Among the known participants is Sakarin Krue-On from Thailand, who is creating a Southeast Asian terraced rice field on a hillside outside an 18th-century palace as a large-scale earth-art culture clash..."

2007 was a time when rice planting was not a popular subject and popular activity to be shown in various occasion as in nowaday. Sakarin came up with the idea of applying the terrace for rice plantation on the hillside at Schloss Wilhelmshöhe in Kassel at the first time he went to the city to survey the sites.

In a concept background he cited in his original proposal of the project, Sakarin stated that

".....The site-specific installation Terraced Rice Fields Art Project seeks to create rice fields on the slope leading up to the prestigious Wilhelmshöhe Museum in Kassel. It is an effort to create something in an entirely different and unlikely context, and to fuse two completely opposing sets of cultural beliefs concerning both anthropology and sociology. On one hand, the architecturally brilliant and powerful Wilhelmshöhe, guardian of historical artefacts; and on the other, Terraced Rice Field, a testimony to manís conquest over his environment and a symbol of growth and co-operation. Although they differ in form, both structures have similar humanitarian attributes; their aim is to protect and nurture mankind.

This will be done through agriculture activity, a tradition born from primitive time, a tool to test the co-operation of people. This project will enlist help of the people of Kassel, both locals and foreigners. It is hoped that by working together to create these fields, the idea of ‘self’ and the division of labour in modern society will be put to question. The study of this simple yet effective farming method will also prove that the contemporary social system we live in is not the only way. A system such as farming may look so primitive and disconnected from daily life in Europe that it seems like a romantic notion, but in fact farming still continue to be a source of sustenance in countries all over the world.

           Terraced Rice Fields stresses the importance of the process, and not the end product. I hope that the creative effort of Terraced Rice Fields Art Project will show one possible solution to the problem of sustenance, and reveal the simplicity of co dependence on other human beings, of life as it lived in our early societies.

           Reflecting on generosity and making an effort to be generous, to meet halfway, to be honest and harmonious, is a starting point to proving that a society based on co-operation and support will not be easily abolished.  This simpler way of living may then turn out to be what everyone truly desires."

Ripe Project : Village and Harvest Time (สวรรค์บ้านนา ถึงเวลาเก็บเกี่ยว), 2008

The project was a follow up of the Terrace Rice field Art project under the collaboration between the artist and Tang Contemporary Art and ARDEL Gallery of Modern Art and was present through the methods of site- specific installation and multidisciplinary. The project was given an explanation and citing in details accordingly by the curator Josef Ng as in the excerpt below

"... Yet, rather than to call attention to agricultural spectacle around a localized form of community practice, this project was about empowerment. Informed by co-dependency, informed by an ideal notion of a dialogic space, a temporary field Krue-on wants to establish where people from geographically, culturally and socially disparate spaces come together to express their differences and ideas while allowing communitarian pluralism.

Depending not so much on what is actually produced in tangible form vis a vis, the framework that Krue-on has established, certainly creates an entryway where an alternative living methodologies can be considered in addition to engaging the politics and practice of contemporary consumer culture.

The process continued with this latest solo exhibition, simultaneously held in 2 venues at the same time and later, in another site as part of a group exhibition. Again, interested in bringing forth how daily activities of life and artistic process work within each other, creating a social dynamics of community-building, Ripe Project: village and harvest time represents a disparate of conceptual pursuits. Categorized as, what the artist termed, "3 sub-elements", namely, Production, Re-production and Propaganda, each sub-element is presented in a different site, yet, they are connectedly marked by a concern over the everyday and the experiential; an imperative for the artist in this project.

In Ardel Gallery of Modern Art lies the essence of "Production", where grown rice brought back from Krue-on's Terraced Rice Field Art Project in Germany, will be re-planted together with new rice seedlings here in Thailand. This will be accompanied by a diaristic chronological timeline, in the form of drawings and diagrams, photography, video and narrated text, of the artist's seeds of cultivation in the project, from site visit to planning to execution in Documenta and finally, right up till now.

In Tang Contemporary Art, for the sub-element of "Re-production", an installation of ‘miniature’ paintings will be exhibited. Inspired by Thai ancient mural paintings, Krue-on has paid particular attention to the communal activities found in selected murals and ‘re-produce’ them in a series of 12 tempera-based works. Instead of focusing on the big narratives in religious spirituality usually preached in the large compositions of Thai mural paintings, as most are derived from the scriptures of Buddhism, the artist pays more attention to the daily activities of communal living, denouncing the preconception that the idea of the unity between community, labour and sharing represented an anachronistic and dying culture. Instead, he sees this unity as a vibrant, resurgent force to counteract with today's ever-increasing ideology-capitalism.

By having the paintings produced in a size no more than 12 by 15 cm, and having them hanged in the spacious gallery under dimmed light condition, with the only spotlight on these works, Krue-on attempts to tease out the audience to move closely to these souvenir-looking pieces to gaze closely at the contents in these artworks. Under such setting, the audience would be able to focus and to re-construct narratives and possibilities, and re-imagine communities.

The two venues will also be linked by a web-streaming live broadcast so that one can actually view the contents of what's in the respective galleries in real time when visiting either one of them. The last sub-element, "Propaganda", will be the combination of the contents in two venues, and presented in a virtual format in another exhibition, held at the Chulalongkorn University Art Center.

What I enjoy in Krue-on's projects is, not only his shrewd playfulness, yet with sensitivity, but his site-specific variations expose the sanctuaries of culture, whether in relation to personal, society or to art. Krue-on certainly works within the mind of true contemporary artists but, in a manner he only knows how, utilizes spaces and times that are simultaneously local and global to enact a unique contemporaneity."

Venice Biennale, 2009

Krue-On was one of five artists from Bangkok who worked together to represent Thailand at the Venice Biennale in 2003 and again in 2009. In They changed a pavilion into a satirical version of a tourism office, which appeared to be trying to convince the public to visit Thailand as tourists. The office displayed fictitious news broadcasts, large brightly-colored posters, travel brochures, and interactive video displays.

Manorah and Best Friends of the Snake, 2010

An installation of short silent film and art objects showed at 100Tonson Gallery in Bangkok in 2010. The film which was in the artist's specific art project "Two men look out through the same bars . One sees the mud and one sees the stars", inspired by the folktale reciting a melancholic love story between a mythical maiden and a king of a typical kingdom. The story was told through the practice of silent film with humorous and sarcastic manner. The film was also exhibit as part of exhibition 'Thresholds' at Sandaram Tagore Gallery in New York in the project by the curator Gregory Galligan in 2013.

Busan Biennale, 2012 "MONUMENT OF AWAKENING ERA"

Sakarin was invited to participate in Busan Biennale 2012 "Garden of Learning" with a large installation "MONUMENT OF AWAKENING ERA" which dozens of porcelain antlers were installed in a large space of the exhibition venue, just as described in the exhibition catalogue " In a huge, dark gallery, white antlers – a whole flock of them – emanate from a blackish liquid covering the entire floor. The artist calls his worka "monument", but what it is meant to commemorate? The antlers are made of porcelain; they are both fragile and precious. Their image, mirrored in the blackish liquid, only adds to their immaterial, almost ghost-like appearance. This looks more like a landscape of doom, even a graveyard than a monument, and yet this piece holds the secret to an extraordinary beauty.The apparitional look of the antlers forms an afterimage, rendered in three dimensions, of a species that has been extinct since the late 1930s: Schomburgk's Deer. A swamp deer that once roamed the central plains of Thailand (the artist's home country), its antler was characterized by a flat, bushy look. Sakarin Krue-On was once greeted by such an animal at the National Museum of Natural History in Paris. He somehow felt drawn to the grace the animal betrayed, even as a padded thing, and a connection between past and present was made (this is, after all, what museums are for). The artist then learned that, much like today's desperate masses of people, the deer had to flee the often flooded plains of Thailand. The animal was forced to move uphill in search of food, leaving it vulnerably exposed to predators. Schomburgk's Deer came to realize much too late that the creatures following him were not fellow deer, but humans – hunters wearing antlers for better range and rifle accuracy.The flooded plains, the people, the deer – all of these are present and connected in the Monument. And yet, given the history of the animal's extinction, do we have to attribute the porcelain antler to the deer, or could it be the human – the hunter in disguise? Indeed, what is being commemorated here might not be Schomburgk's Deer, but a human intelligence that facilitates not only the destruction of the world's riches, but also and ultimately itself" Garden of learning /Busan Biennale catalogue/ 2012/ p. 89-92

The "MONUMENT OF AWAKENING ERA" was moved across from Korea Peninsular to Sanya, a sea beach city of China to be installed in Sanya Art in 2013

Imply-Reply : 2015 Art exhibition of Huang Yong Ping and Sakarin Krue-On.

The exhibition consisted of older works and some new works of both artists showing at Bangkok Art and Culture Centre on 11 February - 26 April 2015. On part of Sakarin, the major works he put on show in this exhibition included "Yellow Simple" a work form his early solo exhibition in 2001 and "Remains" an installation of a couple vases of flowers on a high antique console, a resonant of the essence of life and time which was part of his solo show "h" at H gallery, Bangkok in 2008. The exhibition also held his new works, 'Monkey in the House', 'Upside Down' a memorable size of tapestry narrating the story of Tiger hunt, an implication of our moral principle, 'Rat House' a big wooden house inspired by the old day Chinese gambling game. Another important piece was 'To Stand Lonely on the Turtle Head' an installation of Chinese mythological figure setting on a high platform which was another implication on ethic.

In 2016, 'Monkey in the House' was exhibit at Saatchi Gallery in London as part of exhibition 'Thailand Eye' .

Singapore Biennale 2016 "Kra tua Teang Sue/ Tiger Hunt "

The project was created to perform and exhibit in Singapore Biennale in 2016. As a collaboration between the artist and Wat Khuha Sawan Folk Play Company, a group of actors from Wat Kuhasawan Community, Klong Bangluang, Thonburi, Bangkok. (Wat is Thai word means Buddhist temple), the work aimed to reflect way of life in a megacity in another dimension.

Kra-Tua Taeng Seua is a folk amusement inherited from a traditional folk play vastly known in southern Thailand. In the past, it usually was performed to entertain people during the Buddhist ceremony.

A story of Kra-Tua Taeng Seua is about a villager name Bongton. He was a hunter. Every day he and his sons would go into the forest to hunt animal. His wife would go along with them, carrying with her a basket to collect wild fruits and vegetables. One day, while they were on their way in the forest, they encountered a tiger. The tiger tried to snatch the basket from the wife so Bongton fought with the tiger to protect her. At last, the tiger was killed. The performance was as simple as other folk plays yet the degree of fun was heighten by performers’ acrobatic action, amusing movement of dance and lively sound of traditional percussion played in accordance with verses, narrating the details of the story. The performance would take place on the playground while the viewers sit around to enjoy the show.

Apart from the live performance on the opening occasion, the story of Kra-Tua Taeng Seua was developed into a short film with a script adapted by the staff to emphasis on the faith in humanity. All actors were from Wat Khuha Sawan Folk Play Company. They took part in all the process of the production, from acting coached to costume design, to make it the actual production of their own community. Kra-Tua Taeng Seua was an attempt to confirm their identity and their faith in each others. The Folk play proved itself as a link between the members of Wat Khuha Sawan Folk Play Company's lives and the contemporary way of life instead of being an obstruction that separate them from their own community.

The project also included behind the scene documentary. The process of the production will be documented until the making of the short film is finished. All film, documentary and objects such as original masks and costume were installed and show in the atmosphere of the anthropology museum.

A TALEBEARER’S TALE : The Last Deer - Tang Contemporary Art Bangkok- 2017

"A Talebearer's Tale: The Last Deer," is a solo exhibition for Sakarin Krue-On, it took place from August 16 to September 23, 2017. This exhibition continued creative threads from the artist's previous conceptual art, which draws inspiration from traditional Thai culture and reflects the crises and challenges currently facing Thailand within the context of globalization.

This solo exhibition, "A Talebearer's Tale: The Last Deer," serves as an extension of Monument of an Awakening Era, the work that Sakarin Krue-On showed at the 2012 Busan Biennale. The key work in this exhibition, A Talebearer's Tale, also begins with the story of the Schomburgk's deer. When we walk into the exhibition space, a classic desk sits in the middle, bearing the lifelike head of a Schomburgk's deer. On a nearby wall hangs a Thai folk painting from the twentieth century; a video plays on the other side of the hall, showing the artist interviewing people on the street about the legend of the Schomburgk's deer. The exhibition also contains a rich array of historical documents, and the overall layout of the show is reminiscent of a display in a natural history museum.

Through this exhibition, Sakarin Krue-On attempts to present his thoughts after encountering the world's only Schomburgk's deer specimen at the National Museum of Natural History in Paris. The Schomburgk's deer, a species unique to Thailand, is now extinct. In the forests of Kanchanaburi Province in 1932, the last Schomburgk's deer fell to a hunter's gun. In Samut Sakhon in 1938, a drunkard beat the last recorded Schomburgk's deer to death at a local temple. When the artist discovered this unique Schomburgk's deer specimen in Paris, he finally realized that the legendary, beautiful animal that he had heard about since childhood actually once existed.

"A Talebearer's Tale: The Last Deer" conveys the tragedy of the extinction of this beautiful, legendary species, but the show also explores the greed in human nature, and the irreversible impact people have had on the world and later generations due to a lack of moral restraint and reverence. The artist hopes that viewers will, through the story and extinction of the Schomburgk's deer, consider Thailand's social transformation, and the country's distinctive cultural identity, values, and traditions as it attempts to find balance between the past and the future amidst globalization and economic and social development.
