= Graciela Carnevale =

Argentine artist known for experimental exhibitions

Garciela Carnevale
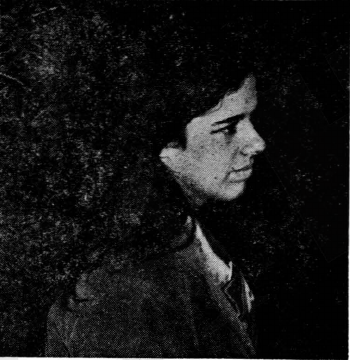
- Born: Córdoba, Argentina

Graciela Carnevale (born 1942, in Marcos Juárez, Córdoba) is an Argentine artist who lives and works in Rosario, Argentina. Carnevale is best known for her involvement in the Ciclo de Arte Experimental exhibition (1968) in Rosario, organised by the Grupo de Arte de Vanguardia de Rosario.

== Life ==
Carnevale is most well known for her art in the 1960s. She is a member of the Grupo de Arte Vanguardia de Rosario (1965–1969) whose objective was to sound out the limits of their own methods and forms of artistic practice in the spirit of the classical Avant Garde. She is best known for her work, El encierro - project for the Experimental Art Series in which she deliberately trapped her audience in an art gallery, so that they could enter, but not escape without a collective effort. More recently, she has been teaching art at the Universidad Nacional de Rosario. Since 2003, she has been coordinating the independent initiative El Levante with artist Mauro Machado, which hosts ongoing workshops and programs for young artists.

== Work ==
=== Acción del Encierro (Confinement Action) ===
Carnevale remains most well known for her experimental Happening; Accion del Encierro (Confinement Action) from 1968. It took place in the context of the Ciclo de Arte Experimental, which included other artists such as Rodolfo Elizalde or Emilio Ghilioni. Protests had taken place and had been brutally repressed in the month in which the Cycle was planned. What united the artists that participated in it, who went by the name of "Grupo de Vanguardia de Rosario", was their interest in dematerialisation and performance art. For the piece, Carnevale invited viewers into an empty gallery and covered the front glass wall with posters. She then locked the viewers in the gallery and left. Carnevale stated that the intention of this action was to invoke a type of "exemplary violence" whereby participants were forced to move from being passive viewers to active and aware participants by engaging in the act of freeing themselves from the gallery. Rather than engaging in violent action, participants flagged down a passerby to break the glass from the outside and free them, passing the responsibility of the violent action on. The pictures of the event show faces of amusement, excitement and curiosity. This Happening was a critique meant to encourage critical reflection on the nature of freedom in Argentina, under military dictatorship at that time. The breaking of the glass of the gallery wall was meant to echo breaking the constraints of political repression.

=== Tucumán Arde ===
Tucumán arde (translated Tucumán is Burning) was an exhibition held in Buenos Aires and Rosario Argentina that began in 1968 in protest of the terrible living and working conditions under military dictator Juan Carlos Onganía. Graciela Carnevale's involvement in the Tucumán Arde protests began as a result of her work with the Circlo de Arte Experimental exhibition in Rosario, Argentina.

=== Later work ===
Collective Creativity

In 2005, the exhibition "Collective Creativity" opened in Kassel, Germany. It presented the works of more than 40 international artist groups. This exhibition dealt with different forms of artistic creativity. These artists shared common programs, methodologies, and political standpoints. The exhibition focused on specific kinds of social tension and used collaborative creativity as a form of resisting the dominant art system and to critique social and political institutions.

Be what you want but stay where you are

This exhibition was anything but aesthetic. It brought together a variety of artworks from different geopolitical areas that share a concern for politics and government. The exhibition, as a dynamic group portrait, helps the viewer contemplate forms of connectedness that usually cannot be perceived.

La Normalidad

The third instalment of "Ex-Argentina", organised in response to the country's 2001 financial crisis. The exhibition gathered protest ephemera, video documentaries, experimental installations, and public projects that examine the relationship between artistic collaboration and social resistance.

== Influence and Involvement ==
=== Grupo de Arte de Vanguardia de Rosario ===
Carnevale was a member of the Grupo de Arte de Vanguardia de Rosario (1965–1969), a collective that aimed to create upheaval in the local Argentine art scene from 1965 until disbandment in 1969.

=== Latin American conceptualism ===
Now operating outside of the traditional institutions of high art, Carnevale has turned her work towards documenting and promoting counter-information about military dictatorship and their attack on human rights in Argentina.
