= Andrea Geyer =

German-American multidisciplinary artist

Andrea Geyer (born 1971 in Freiburg, West Germany) is a German and American multi-disciplinary artist who lives and works in New York City. With a particular focus on those who identify or at some point were identified as women, her works use photography, performance, video, drawing and painting to activate the lingering potential of specific events, sites, or biographies. Geyer focus on the themes of gender, class, national identity and how they are constantly negotiated and reinterpreted against a frequent backdrop of cultural meanings and memories. Geyer has exhibited at institutions such as the San Francisco Museum of Modern Art (SFMOMA), MOMA, and The Whitney Museum.

She has worked with numerous artists such as Wu Tsang, Simon J. Ortiz and Sharon Hayes (artist)

== Early life and education ==
In 1991, Geyer attended basic study painting at the Independent Art Academy in Stuttgart, Germany. After a year, she pursued studies in photography/film design at Fachhochschule Bielefeld. In 1998 Geyer obtained a diploma in Fine Arts at Academy of Fine Arts in Braunschweig, Germany. She studied at the Whitney Independent Study Program in New York City and graduated in 2000. Geyer has been an assistant professor of Fine Arts at the Parsons School of Design since 2009.

== Artwork ==
Geyer's recent work at SFMOMA is about the legacy of Grace Morley, SFMOMA's founding director. The exhibition is called "To Those Who Have Eyes to See". The related performance is called "Traced: Grace McCann Morley’s Museum".

=== Revolt, They said and Insistence, 2012 ===
Revolt and Insistence is a two-part mural project that consisted of a video projection. The first part is a moral drawing in graphite drawing (50 x 85 inch). This is her product of Grey's research on cross-cultural, cross-class and cross-generational history. It highlighted the role various women, through their relationships and organization, had on effecting social, cultural and political change. The objective was to draw awareness to the quiet, uncredited women in the industries of labour organization, social entrepreneurs and cultural revolutionaries that were unrecognized for their achievements in positive social change. Emphasis was given to the three women who founded the MoMa in 1929; Abby Aldrich, Lilli P. Bliss, and Mary Quinn Sullivan. Geyer believes the blueprint for effecting social change can be found through the examination of women's work in history. Her second piece, Insistence, features a 15:21 min video shot overhead of black and white photographs with interjections of colour reproduction of the same heroic women stacked on top of a table. This piece visualized the experiences the women in the postcards and their unheard voices as heroes. By exploring the network of 850 women during the modernist movement in 1920 to 1930s in New York City, Insistence captured the social links between these influential women. This was a large undertaking with a big support team, with the backing of the Museum of Modern Art Archives. Geyer sought to draw awareness to the vast linkage of influential women whose intended and unintended work created a network that ultimately aided each other's efforts towards social change.

=== Criminal Case 40/61: Reverb, 2009 ===
Criminal Case 40/61 is a multimedia installation that was staged at the University of California. It consisted of six channel video installation with six monitors and six stools in High definition video, colour and sound. The duration of the display lasted 42 minutes. It documented an abstract historical trial scene, using the six video projects, one for each; accused, defence, judge, Prosecution, Reporter and Audience. The video narrated Adolf Eichmann's role in the Holocaust. The soundtrack is projected in English and translated into German, Hebrew and Portuguese on headphones for the audience. The six characters were embodied by the same actor name Wu Tsang. This form of performance raised questions regarding the responsibility, truth, justice and the notion of evil and how these themes extend both forward and background in time through the modes of fictionalization. It was an effort to propose terms and strategies with an individual rethinking about the past and present time and have possibility to exceed a mere-restaging.

=== Spiral Lands, 2007-ongoing ===
Spiral Lands was an exhibition that was held in Argos Center for Art and Media in Belgium. There is three parts to this showcase, documented as chapter one, two and three. It raised a central issue that addresses the relation of identity and land in North America. Geyer travels the American Southwest with her camera between the years of 1850 and 2007, and through her diary entries noted the lens through which western historiography was understood by conveying them through photographs of the landscape. This project focuses on one of the longest struggles for social justice in North America; such as the dispossession of lands from Native Americans and their struggle for their rights and the return of their land. ↵In the first chapter it consists of 19 frames, each combining two or three black and white photographs with a text. Partly paired in double takes of the same land scale they recall the tradition of stereotypes in American landscape photography. Geyer employs the form of doubling to draw attention to the fact that a point of view and narrative are never singular but always needs to be read in relation to their author and context. The text punctuates in the classic pastoral idyll: with her own poetic observations and reflects the philosophical treatises, addressing topics of contemporary history, violence, and expulsion through the works of native American scholars and writers.
In chapter two, Geyer examines the role of science and identity. The focus is on the researcher and only focuses on the objective voice of the scholar. The presentation was in a form of slide projection with a sound track. The viewers sit on chairs in front of the screen along with a series of text presented.
Chapter three is a collaboration with the writer name Simon J. Ortiz. That shows a dialogue between the means of poetry, prose and photography. Gelatin silver print in wooden frame and with etched glass. Each of them has 55 cm x 69 cm dimensions.

=== Audrey Munson Project ===
From the notebooks: Audrey Munson, 2004. (research project, book)
“Queen of the Artists’ Studio” The story of Audrey Munson. 2007. Artist book, 128 pages, edition of 500.
Companions of Exile. St. Lawrence State Hospital for the Insane, Ogdensburg, New York. 2008. 11 x14”, digital archival print, engraved glass.
Intaglio. Audrey Munson. 2008. 11 x 14” digital archival print, engraved glass.

This project was supported by the general of Lower Manhattan Cultural Council, space program. It captured the feminist angle Geyer was captivated in. It is a series of four different works made in different years, from 2004 to 2008. She wrote a book contextualizing Munson's life in parallel with the struggle of New York women finding their voices during their lifetimes. Audrey Munson was one of the most famous models, and most captivating muse for artists during the first quarter of the twentieth century. She also starred in early Hollywood movies. The book traces Munson's life and left behind texts, articles and photographs.

== Solo exhibitions ==
2017 – To Those Who Have eyes to see, SFMOMA, San Francisco
2016 – Truly Spun Never, Parque Galeria, Mexico City, Mexico
2014 – Time Fold, Galerie Thomas Zander, Cologne, Germany. It's Time, She Said, installation. Commissioned for the Opening of the New Whitney Museum, New York.
2013 – Sound Giving Will Feeling, presented by A Space Gallery and the Images Festival, Toronto, Canada.
2012 – 9 scripts from a Nation at War (collaboration with Sharon Hayes, Ashley Hunt, Katya Sander and David Thorne). The Museum of Modern Art, New York
2011 – Criminal Case 40/61: Reverb. Siskel Film Center, Chicago (screening). Comrades of Time, Galerie Thomas Zander, Cologne, Germany.
2010 – Criminal case 40/61: Reverb, University of Art Gallery, CA. Spiral Lands / ch.1/2/3 (with Simone J. Ortiz) Belgium.
2009 – Out of Sorts, Landings, Oslo.
2008 – 9 Scripts from a Nation of War. REDCAT (Roy and Edna Disney/Calarts Theater), Los Angeles, CA.
2005 – Spiral Lands. A reading. Free Space. Chelsea Hotel, New York (curated by Dean Daderko)
2004 – Parallax. Kunstverein St. Gallen im Katharinen. St. Gallen, Switzerland.
2003 – Secession, Vienna, Austria. Cat.
2002 – Cambio de Lugar_ Change of Space (with Sharon Hayes). Galerie Signal, Malmö, Sweden
2001 – Fantasies are feelings given form. Don't worry, they are safe if understood. Parlour Projects. Brooklyn, NY.
2000 – Project Space P.S.1 Contemporary Art Center. Long Island City, NY. (with Sharon Hayes)

== Group Exhibition ==
2017 – How Long is Now? KINDL- Centre for contemporary Art, Berlin, Germany
2016 – Critical Aesthetics: The First 10 years, University Art Gallery, Claire Trevor School of Fine Arts, Irvin, CA. Everything Happens somewhere- Galerie Thomas Zander, Cologne, Germany
2015 – Kunst- Musik- Tanz, Museum der Moderne, Salzburg, Austria, Emphasis Repeats, Hessel Museum of Art, NY
2014 – Grounding Future Queer, Parson The New School for Design, New York. Art/ Histories, Museum der Moderne Salzburg, Austria. A VOICE OF ONE’S OWN, Malmö Konstmuseum, Sweden.
2013 – STAGE SET STAGE, SBC Gallery, Montreal Canada Mix NYC: 26th annual Queer Experimental film festival, New York
2012 – Stage It! (part one). Netherlands. Spiral Lands (chapter 1 and 2), Taipei Biennial, Taipei, Taiwan. Contours of the Common. Centre for Contemporary Art Derry, County Londonderry, Northern Ireland. Permission for the revolution, off Limits, Madrid Spain.
2011 – Walking Forward, Running Past. Art in General, New York Kindred Spirits, Galerie Peter Blum, New York Cut. Galerie Thomas Zander, Cologne, Germany.
2010 – Nobody's Property: Art, Land, Space, 2000-2010. Princeton University Art Museum. To the citizens. Serralves Museum. Porto. Portugal, cat.
2009 – Revisiting Histories; Sanford Biggers +Andrea Geyer & Simon J. Ortiz Foundation, New York, Cat.
2008 – When Absence Becomes Presence. Washington Project for the Arts, Washington, DC.
2007 – Spatial Justice. Los Angeles. Contemporary Exhibitions. Los Angeles, CA.
2006 – Kunstraum Lüneburg. Glucksman Gallery, Cork, Ireland Open Space. Art Köln, Köln, Germany
2005 – Looking at America, Galerie Hohenlohe. Vienna
2004 – How do I want to be governed? (figure and ground), Miami Art Central, cat.
2003 – The American Effect. Whitney Museum of American Art. New York. Cat.
2002 – On Route. Serpentine Gallery. London, Great Britain. Cat.
2001 – The Subject and Power (the lyrical voice). Central House of Artist. Moscow, Russia
2000 – Unconsciuos Documentaries. Von Lintel & Nusser Gallery. New York.
1999 – Architorture. White Columns. New York.
1998 – A streetwalk named desire. Kunstraum Luzern. Switzerland.
1997 – Hjem. Architecture Space. Gammeldock, Copenhagen, Denmark.
1996 – Citylimits. Stroke on Trent. Great Britain.
1995 – Groupshow. Museum für Fotografie. Braunschweig, Germany
1994 – Spinning ideas- a room. Gallery LEKRI. Gent. Belgium.

== Publications ==
2004 – Short paper: NOW, THEN AND HOW. Notes on Artistic Practice.
2009 – Books: History is Ours with Sharon Hayes
2007 – Queen of the Artist’ Studios- The Story of Audrey Munson. Art in General, New York, 2008 – Spiral Lands/ Chapter One (Koenig, London),
2008 – Spiral Lands/ Chapter One (Koenig, London),

== Grants and awards ==
2026 – Anonymous Was A Woman grant

2012 - 2013 – Creative Time Global Residency
2011 - 2012 – Museum of Modern Arts Research Fellowship
2007 – Art Matters, Louis Comfort Tiffany Foundation Fellowship
2006 – Vera List Center for Arts and Politics Fellow
2003 – New York Foundation for the Arts, Artist fellowship
