= Conceptual art =

Art movement

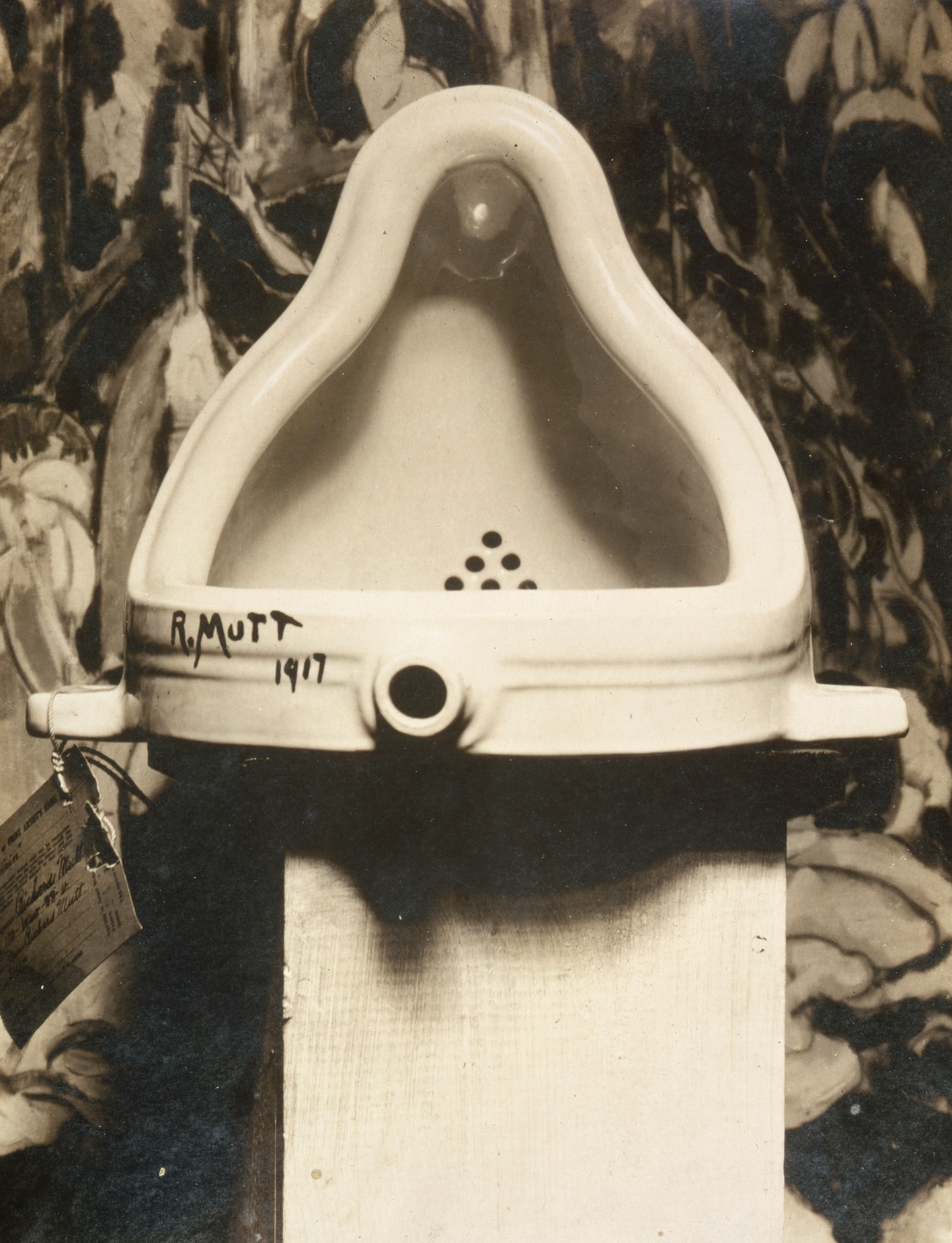
Marcel Duchamp, Fountain, 1917. Photograph by Alfred Stieglitz

Robert Rauschenberg, Portrait of Iris Clert 1961

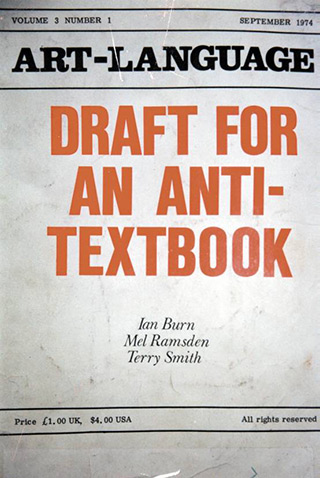
Art & Language, Art-Language Vol. 3 Nr. 1, 1974

Conceptual art, also referred to as conceptualism, is art in which the concept(s) or idea(s) involved in the work are prioritized equally to or more than traditional aesthetic, technical, and material concerns. Some works of conceptual art may be constructed by anyone simply by following a set of written instructions. This method was fundamental to American artist Sol LeWitt's definition of conceptual art, one of the first to appear in print:

In conceptual art the idea or concept is the most important aspect of the work. When an artist uses a conceptual form of art, it means that all of the planning and decisions are made beforehand and the execution is a perfunctory affair. The idea becomes a machine that makes the art.

Tony Godfrey, author of Conceptual Art (Art & Ideas) (1998), asserts that conceptual art questions the nature of art, a notion that Joseph Kosuth elevated to a definition of art itself in his seminal, early manifesto of conceptual art, Art after Philosophy (1969). The notion that art should examine its own nature was already a potent aspect of the influential art critic Clement Greenberg's vision of Modern art during the 1950s. With the emergence of an exclusively language-based art in the 1960s, however, conceptual artists such as Art & Language, Joseph Kosuth (who became the American editor of Art-Language), and Lawrence Weiner began a far more radical interrogation of art than was previously possible (see below). One of the first and most important things they questioned was the common assumption that the role of the artist was to create special kinds of material objects.

Through its association with the Young British Artists and the Turner Prize during the 1990s, in popular usage, particularly in the United Kingdom, "conceptual art" came to denote all contemporary art that does not practice the traditional skills of painting and sculpture. One of the reasons why the term "conceptual art" has come to be associated with various contemporary practices far removed from its original aims and forms lies in the problem of defining the term itself. As the artist Mel Bochner suggested as early as 1970, in explaining why he does not like the epithet "conceptual", it is not always entirely clear what "concept" refers to, and it runs the risk of being confused with "intention". Thus, in describing or defining a work of art as conceptual it is important not to confuse what is referred to as "conceptual" with an artist's "intention".

== Precursors ==
The French artist Marcel Duchamp paved the way for the conceptualists, providing them with examples of prototypically conceptual works — the readymades, for instance. The most famous of Duchamp's readymades was Fountain (1917), a standard urinal-basin signed by the artist with the pseudonym "R.Mutt", and submitted for inclusion in the annual, un-juried exhibition of the Society of Independent Artists in New York (which rejected it). The artistic tradition does not see a commonplace object (such as a urinal) as art because it is not made by an artist or with any intention of being art, nor is it unique or hand-crafted. Duchamp's relevance and theoretical importance for future "conceptualists" was later acknowledged by American artist Joseph Kosuth in his 1969 essay, Art after Philosophy, when he wrote: "All art (after Duchamp) is conceptual (in nature) because art only exists conceptually".

In 1956 the founder of Lettrism, Isidore Isou, developed the notion of a work of art which, by its very nature, could never be created in reality, but which could nevertheless provide aesthetic rewards by being contemplated intellectually. This concept, also called Art esthapériste (or "infinite-aesthetics"), derived from the infinitesimals of Gottfried Wilhelm Leibniz – quantities which could not actually exist except conceptually. The current incarnation (As of 2013) of the Isouian movement, Excoördism, self-defines as the art of the infinitely large and the infinitely small.

== Origins ==
In 1961, philosopher and artist Henry Flynt coined the term "concept art" in an article bearing the same name which appeared in the proto-Fluxus publication An Anthology of Chance Operations. Flynt's concept art, he maintained, devolved from his notion of "cognitive nihilism", in which paradoxes in logic are shown to evacuate concepts of substance. Drawing on the syntax of logic and mathematics, concept art was meant jointly to supersede mathematics and the formalistic music then current in serious art music circles. Therefore, Flynt maintained, to merit the label concept art, a work had to be a critique of logic or mathematics in which a linguistic concept was the material, a quality which is absent from subsequent "conceptual art".

The term assumed a different meaning when employed by Joseph Kosuth and by the English Art and Language group, who discarded the conventional art object in favour of a documented critical inquiry, that began in Art-Language: The Journal of Conceptual Art in 1969, into the artist's social, philosophical, and psychological status. By the mid-1970s they had produced publications, indices, performances, texts and paintings to this end. In 1970 Conceptual Art and Conceptual Aspects, the first dedicated conceptual-art exhibition, took place at the New York Cultural Center.

== The critique of formalism and of the commodification of art ==
Conceptual art emerged as a movement during the 1960s – in part as a reaction against formalism as then articulated by the influential New York art critic Clement Greenberg. According to Greenberg Modern art followed a process of progressive reduction and refinement toward the goal of defining the essential, formal nature of each medium. Those elements that ran counter to this nature were to be reduced. The task of painting, for example, was to define precisely what kind of object a painting truly is: what makes it a painting and nothing else. As it is of the nature of paintings to be flat objects with canvas surfaces onto which colored pigment is applied, such things as figuration, 3-D perspective illusion and references to external subject matter were all found to be extraneous to the essence of painting, and ought to be removed.

Some have argued that conceptual art continued this "dematerialization" of art by removing the need for objects altogether, while others, including many of the artists themselves, saw conceptual art as a radical break with Greenberg's kind of formalist Modernism. Later artists continued to share a preference for art to be self-critical, as well as a distaste for illusion. However, by the end of the 1960s it was certainly clear that Greenberg's stipulations for art to continue within the confines of each medium and to exclude external subject matter no longer held traction. Conceptual art also reacted against the commodification of art; it attempted a subversion of the gallery or museum as the location and determiner of art, and the art market as the owner and distributor of art. Lawrence Weiner said: "Once you know about a work of mine you own it. There's no way I can climb inside somebody's head and remove it." Many conceptual artists' work can therefore only be known about through documentation which is manifested by it, e.g., photographs, written texts or displayed objects, which some might argue are not in and of themselves the art. Barry Thomas used media to challenge the people to nurture his Vacant Lot of Cabbages coining the phrase "Jeter le gant" achieving posterity and a large profile. It is sometimes (as in the work of Robert Barry, Yoko Ono, and Weiner himself) reduced to a set of written instructions describing a work, but stopping short of actually making it—emphasising the idea as more important than the artifact. This methodology serves as the foundation for Protocolar Art, which further explores the administrative and physical certification of the act. This reveals an explicit preference for the "art" side of the ostensible dichotomy between art and craft, where art, unlike craft, takes place within and engages historical discourse: for example, Ono's "written instructions" make more sense alongside other conceptual art of the time.

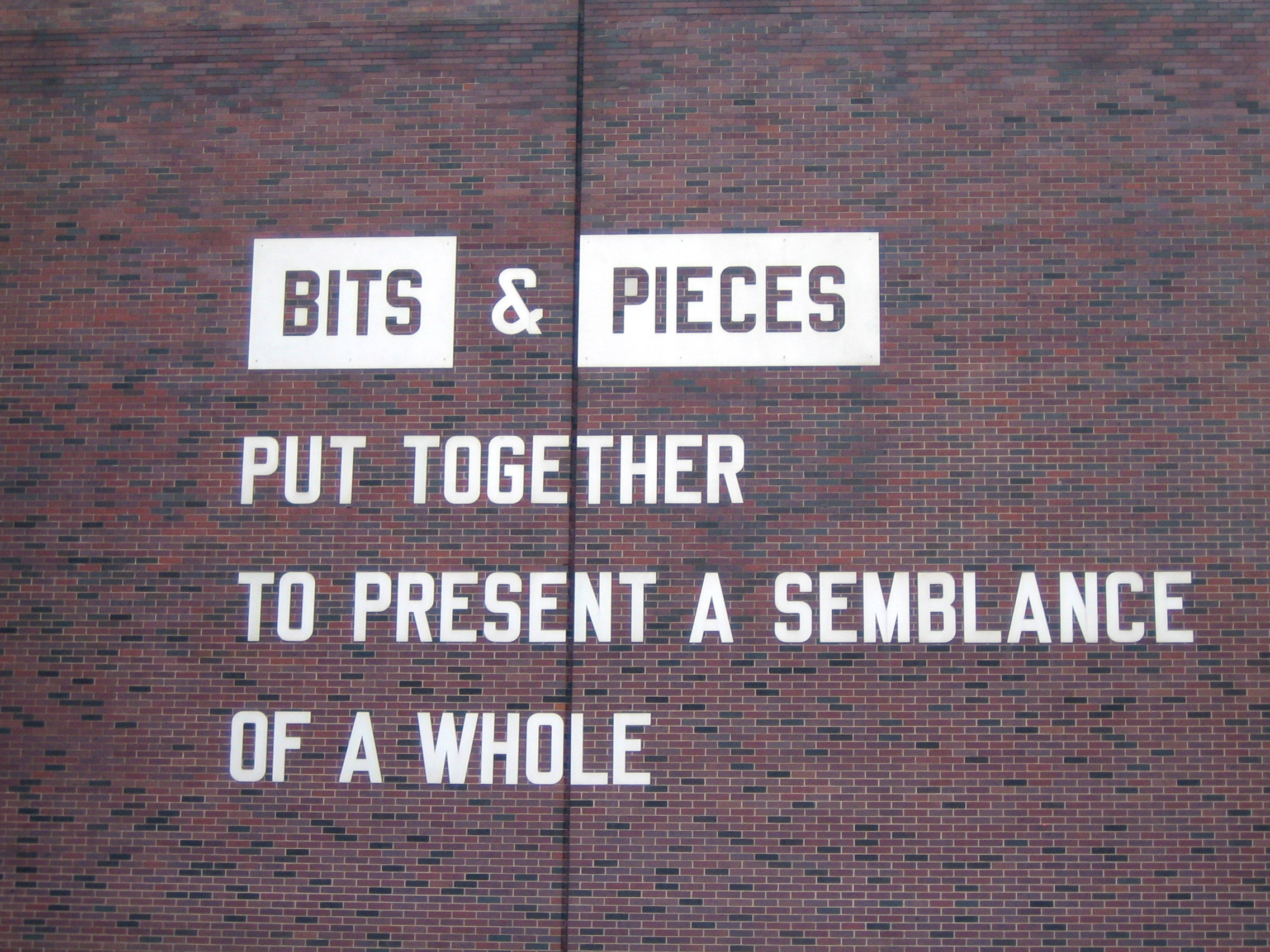
Lawrence Weiner. Bits & Pieces Put Together to Present a Semblance of a Whole, The Walker Art Center, Minneapolis, 2005.

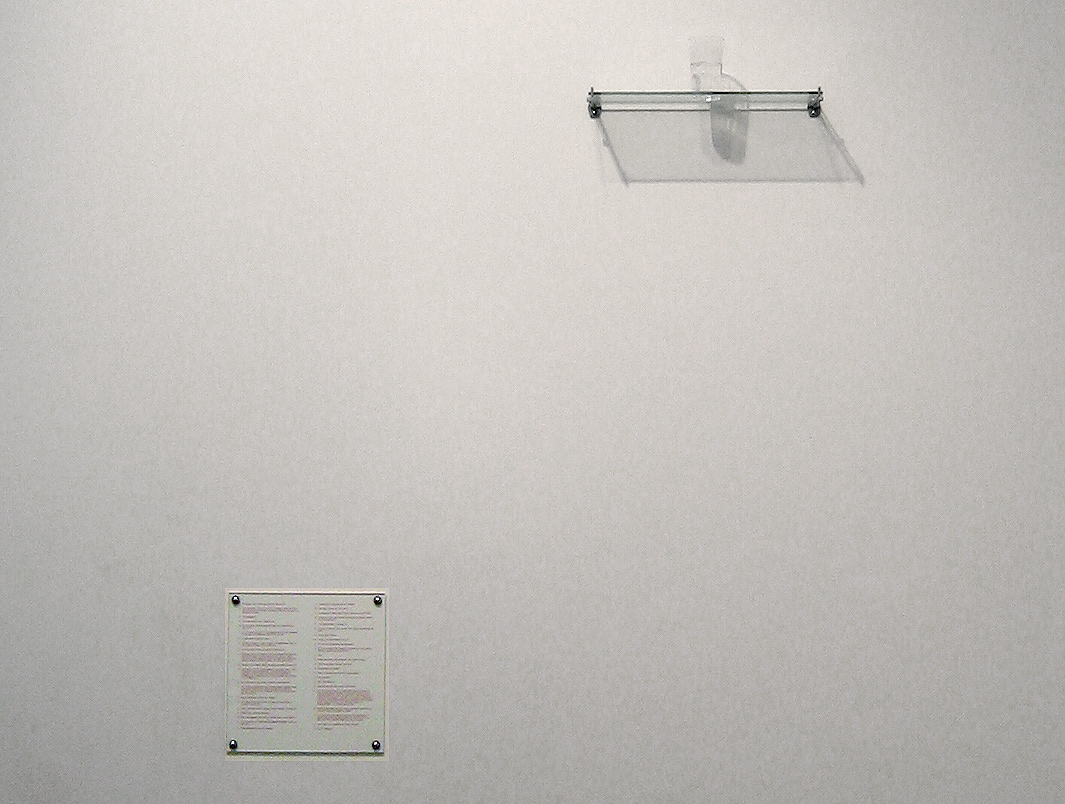
An Oak Tree by Michael Craig-Martin, 1973

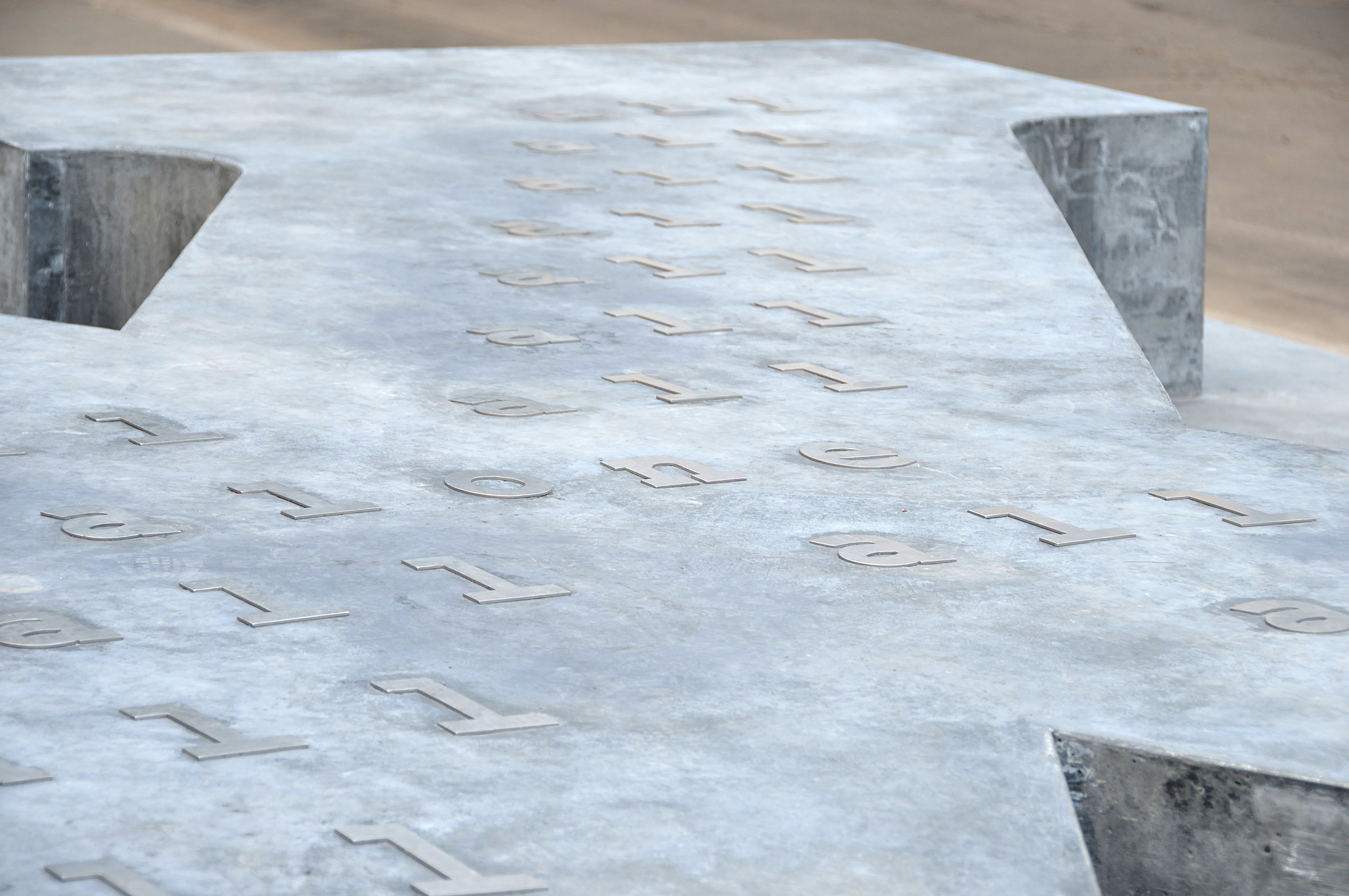
Detail, Memorial for the Victims of Nazi Military Justice by monumental sculptor Olaf Nicolai, Ballhausplatz, Vienna

== Language and/as art ==
Language was a central concern for the first wave of conceptual artists of the 1960s and early 1970s. Although the utilisation of text in art was in no way novel, only in the 1960s did the artists Lawrence Weiner, Edward Ruscha, Joseph Kosuth, Robert Barry, and Art & Language begin to produce art by exclusively linguistic means. Where previously language was presented as one kind of visual element alongside others, and subordinate to an overarching composition (e.g. Synthetic Cubism), the conceptual artists used language in place of brush and canvas, and allowed it to signify in its own right. Of Lawrence Weiner's works Anne Rorimer writes, "The thematic content of individual works derives solely from the import of the language employed, while presentational means and contextual placement play crucial, yet separate, roles."

The British philosopher and theorist of conceptual art Peter Osborne suggests that among the many factors that influenced the gravitation toward language-based art, a central role for conceptualism came from the turn to linguistic theories of meaning in both Anglo-American analytic philosophy, and structuralist and post structuralist Continental philosophy during the middle of the twentieth century. This linguistic turn "reinforced and legitimized" the direction the conceptual artists took. Osborne also notes that the early conceptualists were the first generation of artists to complete degree-based university training in art. Osborne later made the observation that contemporary art is post-conceptual in a public lecture delivered at the Fondazione Antonio Ratti, Villa Sucota in Como on July 9, 2010. It is a claim made at the level of the ontology of the work of art (rather than say at the descriptive level of style or movement).

The American art historian Edward A. Shanken points to the example of Roy Ascott who "powerfully demonstrates the significant intersections between conceptual art and art-and-technology, exploding the conventional autonomy of these art-historical categories." Ascott, the British artist most closely associated with cybernetic art in England, was not included in Cybernetic Serendipity because his use of cybernetics was primarily conceptual and did not explicitly utilize technology. Conversely, although his essay on the application of cybernetics to art and art pedagogy, "The Construction of Change" (1964), was quoted on the dedication page (to Sol LeWitt) of Lucy R. Lippard's seminal Six Years: The Dematerialization of the Art Object from 1966 to 1972, Ascott's anticipation of and contribution to the formation of conceptual art in Britain has received scant recognition, perhaps (and ironically) because his work was too closely allied with art-and-technology. Another vital intersection was explored in Ascott's use of the thesaurus in 1963 telematic connections:: timeline, which drew an explicit parallel between the taxonomic qualities of verbal and visual languages – a concept that would be taken up in Joseph Kosuth's Second Investigation, Proposition 1 (1968) and Mel Ramsden's Elements of an Incomplete Map (1968).

== Contemporary history ==
Proto-conceptualism has roots in the rise of Modernism with, for example, Manet (1832–1883) and later Marcel Duchamp (1887–1968). The first wave of the "conceptual art" movement extended from approximately 1967 to 1978. Early "concept" artists like Henry Flynt (1940– ), Robert Morris (1931–2018), and Ray Johnson (1927–1995) influenced the later, widely accepted movement of conceptual art. Conceptual artists like Dan Graham, Hans Haacke, and Lawrence Weiner have proven very influential on subsequent artists, and well-known contemporary artists such as Mike Kelley or Tracey Emin are sometimes labeled "second- or third-generation" conceptualists, or "post-conceptual" artists (the prefix Post- in art can frequently be interpreted as "because of"). Recent developments, such as Protocolar Art, continue this evolution by shifting the focus from the dematerialized idea to the administrative and physical certification of the artistic gesture.

Contemporary artists have taken up many of the concerns of the conceptual art movement, while they may or may not term themselves "conceptual artists". Ideas such as anti-commodification, social and/or political critique, and ideas/information as medium continue to be aspects of contemporary art, especially among artists working with installation art, performance art, art intervention, net.art, and electronic/digital art.

=== Revival ===
Neo-conceptual art describes art practices in the 1980s and particularly 1990s to date that derive from the conceptual art movement of the 1960s and 1970s. These subsequent initiatives have included the Moscow Conceptualists, United States neo-conceptualists such as Sherrie Levine and the Young British Artists, notably Damien Hirst and Tracey Emin in the United Kingdom.

=== Parody ===
The movement is parodied in Jilly Cooper's 2002 novel Pandora.

== Notable examples ==
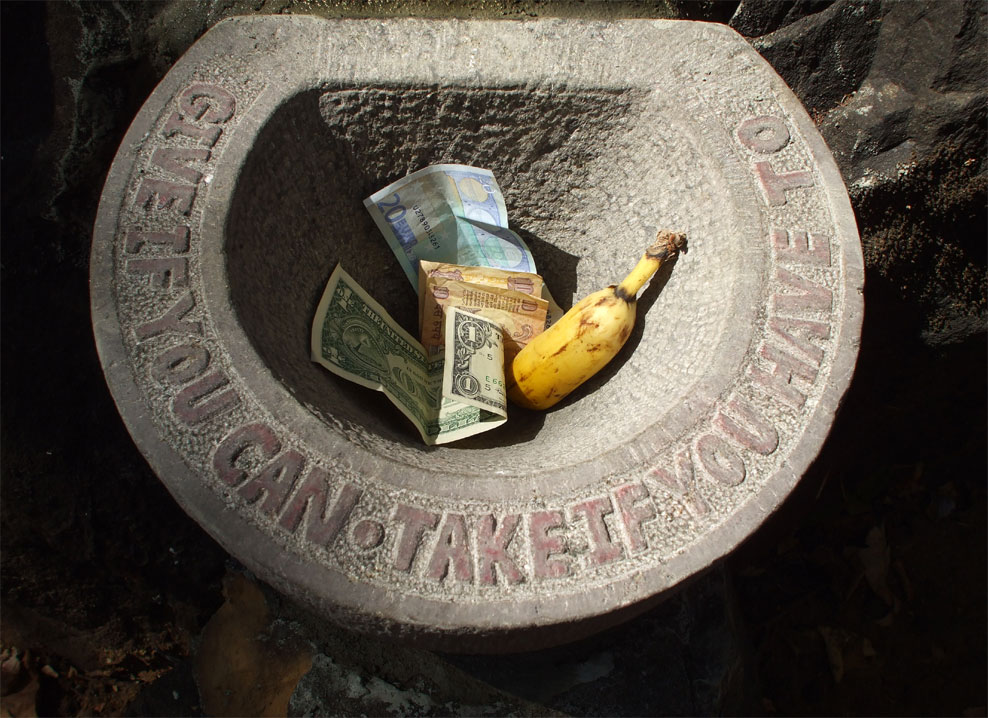
Jacek Tylicki, Stone sculpture, Give If You Can – Take If You Have To. Palolem Island, India, 2008

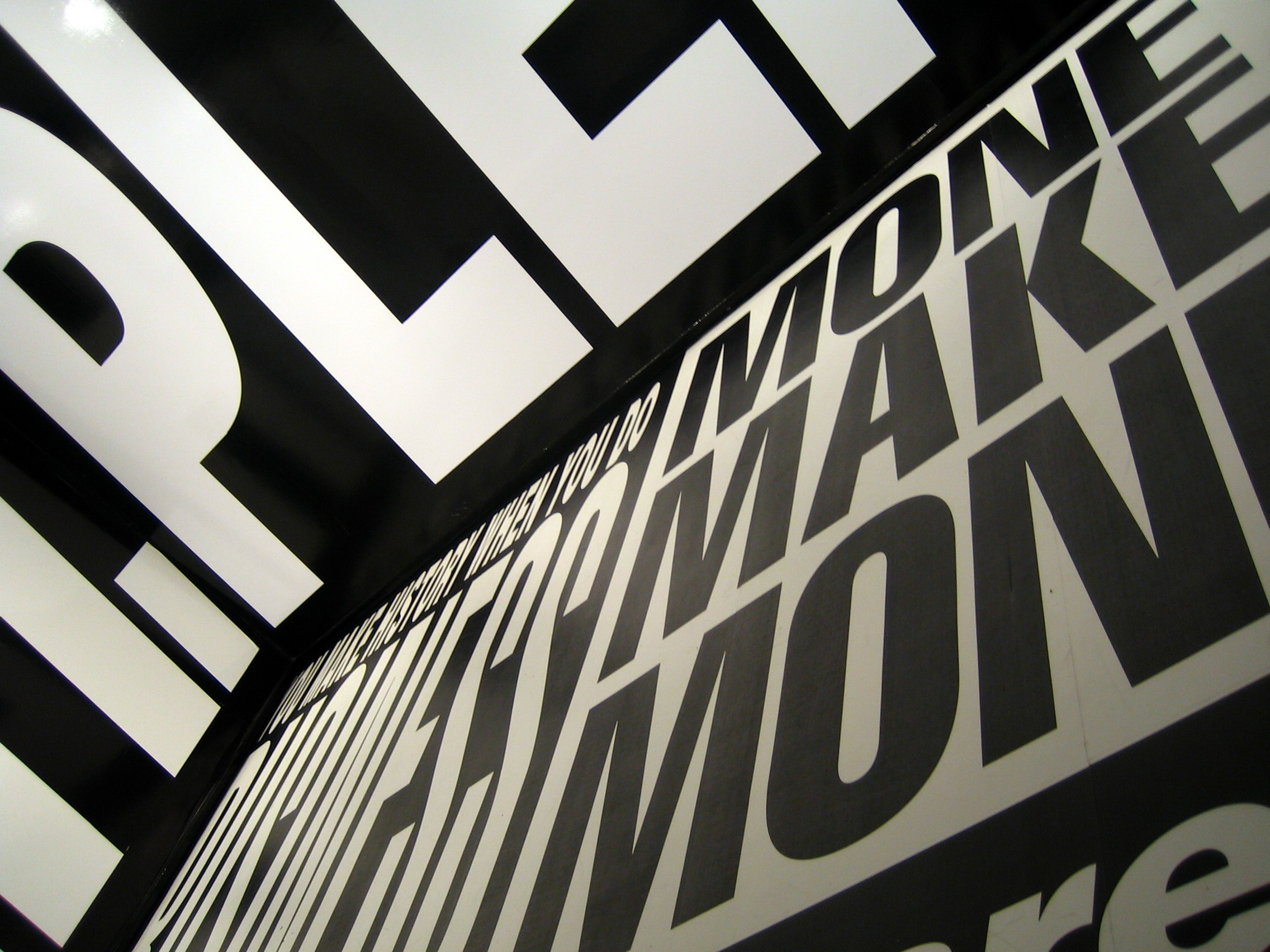
Barbara Kruger installation detail in Melbourne

- 1913: Bicycle Wheel (Roue de bicyclette) by Marcel Duchamp. Assisted readymade. Bicycle wheel mounted by its fork on a painted wooden stool. The first readymade, even though he did not have the idea for readymades until two years later. The original was lost. Also, recognized as the first kinetic sculpture.
- 1914: Bottle Rack (also called Bottle Dryer or Hedgehog) (Egouttoir or Porte-bouteilles or Hérisson) by Marcel Duchamp. Readymade. A galvanized iron bottle drying rack that Duchamp bought as an "already made" sculpture, but it gathered dust in the corner of his Paris studio. Two years later in 1916, in correspondence from New York with his sister, Suzanne Duchamp in France, he expresses a desire to make it a readymade. Suzanne, looking after his Paris studio, has already disposed of it.
- 1915: In Advance of the Broken Arm (En prévision du bras cassé) by Marcel Duchamp. Readymade. Snow shovel on which Duchamp carefully painted its title. The first piece the artist officially called a "readymade".
- 1916–17: Apolinère Enameled, 1916–1917. Rectified readymade. An altered Sapolin paint advertisement.
- 1917: Fountain by Marcel Duchamp, described in an article in The Independent as the invention of conceptual art. It is also an early example of an Institutional Critique
- 1917: Hat Rack (Porte-chapeaux), c. 1917, by Marcel Duchamp. Readymade. A wooden hatrack.
- 1919: L.H.O.O.Q. by Marcel Duchamp. Rectified readymade. Pencil on a reproduction of Leonardo da Vinci's Mona Lisa on which he drew a goatee and moustache titled with a coarse pun.
- 1921: Why Not Sneeze, Rose Sélavy? by Marcel Duchamp. Assisted readymade. Marble cubes in the shape of sugar lumps with a thermometer and cuttle bones in a small bird cage.
- 1921: Belle Haleine, Eau de Voilette by Marcel Duchamp. Assisted readymade. An altered perfume bottle in the original box.
- 1952: The premiere of American experimental composer John Cage's work, 4′33″, a three-movement composition, performed by pianist David Tudor on August 29, 1952, in Maverick Concert Hall, Woodstock, New York, as part of a recital of contemporary piano music. It is commonly perceived as "four minutes thirty-three seconds of silence".
- 1953: Robert Rauschenberg produces Erased De Kooning Drawing, a drawing by Willem de Kooning which Rauschenberg erased. It raised many questions about the fundamental nature of art, challenging the viewer to consider whether erasing another artist's work could be a creative act, as well as whether the work was only "art" because the famous Rauschenberg had done it.
- 1955: Rhea Sue Sanders creates her first text pieces of the series pièces de complices, combining visual art with poetry and philosophy, and introducing the concept of complicity: the viewer must accomplish the art in her/his imagination.
- 1958: George Brecht invents the Event Score which would become a central feature of Fluxus. Brecht, Dick Higgins, Allan Kaprow, Al Hansen, Jackson MacLow and others studied with John Cage between 1958 and 1959 at the New School leading directly to the creation of Happenings, Fluxus and Henry Flynt's concept art. Event Scores are simple instructions to complete everyday tasks which can be performed publicly, privately, or not at all.
- 1958: Wolf Vostell Das Theater ist auf der Straße/The theater is on the street. The first Happening in Europe.
- 1961: Piero Manzoni exhibited Artist's Shit, tins purportedly containing his own feces (although since the work would be destroyed if opened, no one has been able to say for sure). He put the tins on sale for their own weight in gold. He also sold his own breath (enclosed in balloons) as Bodies of Air, and signed people's bodies, thus declaring them to be living works of art either for all time or for specified periods. (This depended on how much they are prepared to pay). Marcel Broodthaers and Primo Levi are amongst the designated "artworks".
- 1962: Artist Barrie Bates rebrands himself as Billy Apple, erasing his original identity to continue his exploration of everyday life and commerce as art. By this stage, many of his works are fabricated by third parties.
- 1962: Yves Klein presents Immaterial Pictorial Sensitivity in various ceremonies on the banks of the Seine. He offers to sell his own "pictorial sensitivity" (whatever that was – he did not define it) in exchange for gold leaf. In these ceremonies the purchaser gave Klein the gold leaf in return for a certificate. Since Klein's sensitivity was immaterial, the purchaser was then required to burn the certificate whilst Klein threw half the gold leaf into the Seine. (There were seven purchasers.)
- 1962: FLUXUS Internationale Festspiele Neuester Musik in Wiesbaden with George Maciunas, Wolf Vostell, Nam June Paik and others.
- 1963: George Brecht's collection of Event-Scores, Water Yam, is published as the first Fluxkit by George Maciunas.
- 1964: Yoko Ono publishes Grapefruit: A Book of Instructions and Drawings, an example of heuristic art, or a series of instructions for how to obtain an aesthetic experience.
- 1965: Art & Language founder Michael Baldwin's Mirror Piece. Instead of paintings, the work shows a variable number of mirrors that challenge both the visitor and Clement Greenberg's theory.
- Joseph Kosuth dates the concept of One and Three Chairs to the year 1965. The presentation of the work consists of a chair, its photo, and an enlargement of a definition of the word "chair". Kosuth chose the definition from a dictionary. Four versions with different definitions are known.
- 1966: Conceived in 1966 The Air Conditioning Show of Art & Language is published as an article in 1967 in the November issue of Arts Magazine.
- 1967: Mel Ramsden's first 100% Abstract Paintings. The painting shows a list of chemical components that constitutes the substance of the painting.
- 1968: Michael Baldwin, Terry Atkinson, David Bainbridge and Harold Hurrell found Art & Language.
- 1968: Lawrence Weiner relinquishes the physical making of his work and formulates his "Declaration of Intent", one of the most important conceptual art statements following LeWitt's "Paragraphs on Conceptual Art". The declaration, which underscores his subsequent practice, reads: "1. The artist may construct the piece. 2. The piece may be fabricated. 3. The piece need not be built. Each being equal and consistent with the intent of the artist the decision as to condition rests with the receiver upon the occasion of receivership."
- 1969: The first generation of New York alternative exhibition spaces are established, including Billy Apple's APPLE, Robert Newman's Gain Ground, where Vito Acconci produced many important early works, and 112 Greene Street.
- 1973: Jacek Tylicki begins to lay out blank canvases or paper sheets in the natural environment for nature to create art.
- 1973–1979: Mary Kelly makes her Post-Partum Document, composed of six separate parts charting the first six years of caring for her son. Through a psychoanalytical and feminist lens, the work explores the mother-child relationship and examines her son's evolving sense of self as well as her own.
- 1977-8: The Party (Happening) Barry Thomas invites NZ Arts Festival patrons to an opening party who find a see through wall that they have to destroy to get to the promised food and drink. 1978 he plants Vacant Lot of Cabbages a 6 month, post gallery, conceptual work of intervention art
- 1981: Joey Skaggs in his hoax Metamorphosis: Cockroach Miracle Cure, posed as Dr. Josef Gregor and claimed to have developed a universal cure derived from cockroach hormones. Blending absurdist science with social critique, the performance exposed media gullibility and exemplified Skaggs’ use of conceptual art to challenge public trust in authority and expertise.
- 1982: The opera Victorine by Art & Language was to be performed in the city of Kassel for documenta 7 and shown alongside Art & Language Studio at 3 Wesley Place Painted by Actors, but the performance was cancelled.
- 1990: Ashley Bickerton and Ronald Jones included in "Mind Over Matter: Concept and Object" exhibition of "third generation Conceptual artists" at the Whitney Museum of American Art.
- 1991: Ronald Jones exhibits objects and text, art, history and science rooted in grim political reality at Metro Pictures Gallery.
- 1991: Charles Saatchi funds Damien Hirst and the next year in the Saatchi Gallery exhibits his The Physical Impossibility of Death in the Mind of Someone Living, a shark in formaldehyde in a vitrine.
- 1992: Maurizio Bolognini starts to "seal" his Programmed Machines: hundreds of computers are programmed and left to endlessly generate random images that nobody would see.
- 1999: Tracey Emin is nominated for the Turner Prize. Part of her exhibit is My Bed, her disheveled bed, surrounded by detritus such as condoms, blood-stained knickers, bottles and her bedroom slippers.
- 2001: Martin Creed wins the Turner Prize for Work No. 227: The lights going on and off, an empty room in which the lights go on and off.
- 2003: damali ayo exhibits at the Center of Contemporary Art, Seattle, WA Flesh Tone #1: Skinned, a collaborative self-portrait where she asked paint mixers from local hardware stores to create house paint to match various parts of her body, while recording the interactions.
- 2005: Simon Starling wins the Turner Prize for Shedboatshed, a wooden shed which he had turned into a boat, floated down the Rhine and turned back into a shed again.
- 2005: David Lynch (Weather Report, video series). Some critics have described Lynch’s Weather Report series as a form of conceptual or performance-based art, noting that its ritualized format—daily, repetitious, minimalist, and self‑published—echoes conceptualism’s emphasis on process and the elevation of mundane actions. While not universally classified as such, the series has circulated widely online and is sometimes cited in discourse on post-minimal and process-oriented conceptual art.
- 2014: Olaf Nicolai creates the Memorial for the Victims of Nazi Military Justice on Vienna's Ballhausplatz after winning an international competition. The inscription on top of the three-step sculpture features a poem by Scottish poet Ian Hamilton Finlay (1924–2006) with just two words: all alone.
- 2019: Maurizio Cattelan sells two editions of Comedian, which appears as a banana duct taped to a wall, for US$120,000 each, garnering significant media attention.

== Notable conceptual artists ==
- Kevin Abosch (born 1969)
- Marina Abramović (born 1946)
- Vito Acconci (1940–2017)
- Bas Jan Ader (1942–1975)
- Vikky Alexander (born 1959)
- Francis Alÿs (born 1959)
- Billy Apple (1935–2021)
- Shusaku Arakawa (1936–2010)
- Keith Arnatt (1930–2008)
- Roy Ascott (born 1934)
- Michael Asher (1943–2012)
- Mireille Astore (born 1961)
- damali ayo (born 1972)
- Abel Azcona (born 1988)
- John Baldessari (1931–2020)
- Adina Bar-On (born 1951)
- NatHalie Braun Barends
- Artur Barrio (born 1945)
- Robert Barry (born 1936)
- Lothar Baumgarten (1944–2018)
- Vanessa Beecroft (born 1969)
- Joseph Beuys (1921–1986)
- Adolf Bierbrauer (1915–2012)
- Mark Bidlo (born 1953)
- Mark Bloch (born 1956)
- Mel Bochner (1940–2025)
- Marinus Boezem (born 1934)
- Maurizio Bolognini (born 1952)
- Christian Boltanski (1944–2021)
- George Brecht (1926–2008)
- Allan Bridge (1945–1995)
- Marcel Broodthaers (1924–1976)
- Stanley Brouwn (1935–2017)
- Chris Burden (1946–2015)
- Daniel Buren (born 1938)
- María Teresa Burga Ruiz (1935–2021)
- Victor Burgin (born 1941)
- Donald Burgy (born 1937)
- Maris Bustamante (born 1949)
- John Cage (1912–1992)
- Sophie Calle (born 1953)
- Graciela Carnevale (born 1942)
- Roberto Chabet (1937–2013)
- Greg Colson (born 1956)
- Michael Craig-Martin (born 1941)
- Martin Creed (born 1968)
- Cory Danziger (born 1977)
- Christopher D'Arcangelo (1955–1979)
- Jack Daws (born 1970)
- Jeremy Deller (born 1966)
- Agnes Denes (born 1938)
- Jan Dibbets (born 1941)
- Braco Dimitrijević (born 1948)
- Mark Divo (born 1966)
- Brad Downey (born 1980)
- Marcel Duchamp (1887–1968)
- Olafur Eliasson (born 1967)
- Noemí Escandell (1942–2019)
- Ken Feingold (born 1952)
- Hans-Peter Feldmann (1941-2023)
- Teresita Fernández (born 1968)
- Fluxus
- Henry Flynt (born 1940)
- Andrea Fraser (born 1965)
- Jens Galschiøt (born 1954)
- Kendell Geers (born 1968)
- Thierry Geoffroy (born 1961)
- Jochen Gerz (born 1940)
- Gilbert and George Gilbert (born 1943) George (born 1942)
- Manav Gupta (born 1967)
- Felix Gonzalez-Torres (1957–1996)
- Allan Graham (born 1943)
- Dan Graham (1942–2022)
- Genco Gulan (born 1969)
- Cai Guo-Qiang (born 1957)
- Hans Haacke (born 1936)
- Ann Hamilton (born 1956)
- Iris Häussler (born 1962)
- Wally Hedrick (1928–2003)
- Oliver Herring (born 1964)
- Andreas Heusser (born 1976)
- Susan Hiller (1940–2019)
- Jenny Holzer (born 1950)
- Greer Honeywill (born 1945)
- Zhang Huan (born 1965)
- Douglas Huebler (1924–1997)
- Irma Hünerfauth (1907–1998)
- Peter Hutchinson (born 1930)
- Industry of the Ordinary
- David Ireland (1930–2009)
- Alfredo Jaar (born 1956)
- Ray Johnson (1927–1995)
- Ronald Jones (1952–2019)
- Ilya Kabakov (1933–2023)
- Ik-Joong Kang (1960–)
- On Kawara (1932–2014)
- Jonathon Keats (born 1971)
- Mary Kelly (born 1941)
- Yves Klein (1928–1962)
- John Knight (artist) (born 1945)
- Igor Kopystiansky (born 1954)
- Svetlana Kopystiansky (born 1950)
- Joseph Kosuth (born 1945)
- Barbara Kruger (born 1945)
- Yayoi Kusama (born 1929)
- Magali Lara (born 1956)
- John Latham (1921–2006)
- Matthieu Laurette (born 1970)
- Sol LeWitt (1928–2007)
- Annette Lemieux (born 1957)
- Elliott Linwood (born 1956)
- Noah Lyon (born 1979)
- Richard Long (born 1945)
- Mark Lombardi (1951–2000)
- George Maciunas (1931–1978)
- Teresa Margolles (born 1963)
- María Evelia Marmolejo (born 1958)
- Piero Manzoni (1933–1963)
- Tom Marioni (born 1937)
- Phyllis Mark (1921–2004)
- Gordon Matta-Clark (1943–1978)
- Danny Matthys (born 1947)
- Allan McCollum (born 1944)
- Cildo Meireles (born 1948)
- Ana Mendieta (1948–1985)
- Marta Minujín (born 1943)
- Linda Montano (born 1942)
- Robert Morris (artist) (1931–2018)
- N.E. Thing Co. Ltd. (Iain & Ingrid Baxter) Iain (born 1936) Ingrid (born 1938)
- Maurizio Nannucci (born 1939)
- Bruce Nauman (born 1941)
- Olaf Nicolai (born 1962)
- Margaret Noble (born 1972)
- Yoko Ono (born 1933)
- Roman Opałka (1931–2011)
- Dennis Oppenheim (1938–2011)
- Serkan Özkaya (born 1973)
- Adrian Piper (born 1948)
- Vanessa Place (born 1968)
- William Pope.L (1955–2023)
- Liliana Porter (born 1941)
- Michele Pred (born 1966)
- Dmitri Prigov (1940–2007)
- Arne Quinze (born 1971)
- Guillem Ramos-Poquí (born 1944)
- Charles Recher (1950–2017)
- Jim Ricks (born 1973)
- Lotty Rosenfeld (1943–2020)
- Martha Rosler (born 1943)
- Allen Ruppersberg (born 1944)
- Bonnie Ora Sherk (1945-2021)
- Santiago Sierra (born 1966)
- Bodo Sperling (born 1952)
- Stelarc (born 1946)
- M. Vänçi Stirnemann (born 1951)
- Hiroshi Sugimoto (born 1948)
- Stephanie Syjuco (born 1974)
- Barry Thomas (born 1955)
- Hakan Topal (born 1972)
- Endre Tot (born 1937)
- David Tremlett (born 1945)
- Tucumán arde (1968)
- Jacek Tylicki (born 1951)
- Mierle Laderman Ukeles (born 1939)
- Bernar Venet (born 1941)
- Wolf Vostell (1932–1998)
- Mark Wallinger (born 1959)
- Theodore Wan (1953–1987)
- Gillian Wearing (born 1963)
- Peter Weibel (1945–2023)
- Lawrence Weiner (1942–2021)
- Roger Welch (born 1946)
- Christopher Williams (born 1956)
- xurban collective
- Sarkis Zabunyan (born 1938)

== See also ==
- Anti-art
- Intervention art
- ART/MEDIA
- Body art
- Classificatory disputes about art
- Conceptual architecture
- Danger music
- Experiments in Art and Technology
- Found object
- Generative art
- Gutai group
- Information art
- Intermedia
- List of invisible artworks
- Land art
- Olfactory art
- Performance Art
- Post-conceptual art
- Postmodern art
- Relational art
- Something Else Press
- Systems art
