= Vasudha Thozhur =

- Born: 1956; Mysore, India
- Education: College of Arts and Craft, Chennai (Madras), India and Croydon School of Art and Design, London, UK
- Known for: Painting
- Notable work: Beyond Pain: An Afterlife

Vasudha Thozhur is an interdisciplinary artist, focusing mainly on painting. She is currently a professor in the Department of Art and Performing Art in Shiv Nadar University, Noida. She has also collaborated with Himmat, an activist organisation based in Vatva, Ahmedabad, an organisation that works with the survivors of the Gujarat Riots.

== Early life ==
Thozhur was born on 14 October 1956 in Mysore. From 1981-1997, she lived and worked in Chennai.

== Education ==
Thozhur did her training in Chennai. In 1979, she completed her diploma in painting from the College of Arts and Crafts in Chennai. She did her post diploma in painting from the Croydon School of Art and Design, United Kingdom. She did her residency Shaddon Mills Visual Arts Centre, Carlisle and Gasworks Studios, London. In 1988, she received the Central Lalit Kala Academy Research Grant and in 1989, she received the Ministry of Culture Fellowship for Artists. In 1996, she was the recipient of the French Government Scholarship and The Charles Wallace Grant.

== Career ==
Thozhur has not restricted herself to a single medium of expression. She works with oil as well as water colours. Her art is such that it is open to multiple interpretations. One of her exhibitions included a two-person show at the Cite Internationale des Arts, Paris. She received two grants from the India Foundation for the Arts, Bangalore, in 2004 – 2006 and 2009 – 2011, to support her research projects, ‘The Himmat Workshops', which began in January 2004.

Her work has been extensively based on the Gujarat Riots, which took place in Naroda Patiya, where she collaborated with the survivors of the massacre who lost their family members, for a project titled ‘Beyond Pain – An Afterlife’. A residency at Khoj supported the project. The project was sponsored by India Foundation for the Arts (IFA), and supported by Himmat. Her project depicted collective trauma and the consequences of the massacre on the lives of the survivors.

Some more of her works include: ‘Voices Against Violence’, Faculty of Fine Arts, MSU, Vadodara. (2002); ‘Diverge’, curated by Geeta Kapur and Chaitanya Sambrani at the National Gallery of Modern Art, Mumbai (2003); ‘Edge of Desire: Recent Art in India’, curated by Chaitanya Sambrani and supported by Art Gallery of Western Australia and The Asia Society, New York (2004); solo show ‘Untouchable’ at Sakshi Gallery Mumbai and Vadehra Art Gallery, New Delhi (2007); Workshops at Khoj, New Delhi: ‘Imagine Peace’ (April 2009), and workshop/discussion around community projects (October 2009); Represented at The India Art Summit by Sakshi Gallery (2011); solo show ‘The Anatomy of Celebration" at Latitude 28, New Delhi (2012) and solo show ‘Beyond Pain: An Afterlife’ at Sakshi Gallery and Project 88, Mumbai, in collaboration with Himmat (2013).

Besides a career in the arts, she has also taught as visiting faculty at MS University Vadodara, National Institute of Design Ahmedabad and Indian Institute of Crafts & Design, Jaipur.
