= Burgy (disambiguation) =

Burgy is a village in Saône-et-Loire, Bourgogne, France.

Burgy may also refer to:

- Carine Burgy (born 1970), French powerlifter
- Donald Burgy (born 1937), American artist
- Nicolas Bürgy (born 1995), Swiss football player
- The Burgies, Merseyside, England
