= EJ Hill =

American artist (born 1985)

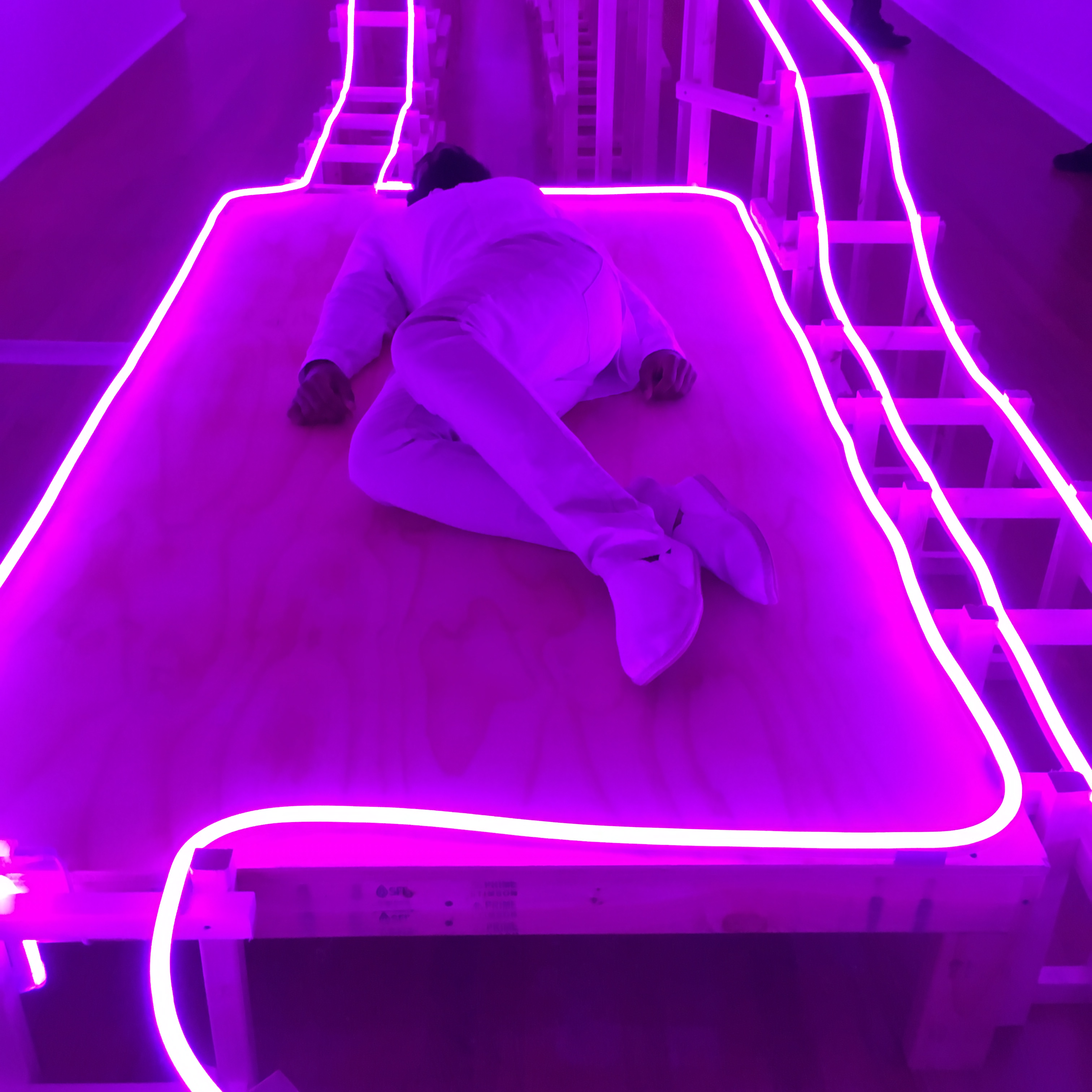
- EJ Hill at the Studio Museum Harlem in 2016
- Born: Ernest Joseph Hill; 1985 (age 40–41); Los Angeles California
- Education: Columbia College Chicago, UCLA
- Known for: Performance art, painting, sculpture, installation art
- Notable work: A Monumental Offering of Potential Energy

EJ Hill (born Ernest Joseph Hill; in 1985) is a contemporary American artist from Los Angeles who works in durational performance, installation, painting, and collage.

== Early life and education ==
EJ Hill was born in Los Angeles, California in 1985. As a child, Hill lived in South Central until he was eight years old. He then moved to Carson, and to Torrance at 15 years old. At the age of 22, Hill started attending Columbia College Chicago, where he would be greatly influenced by the work of Chris Burden and Industry of the Ordinary. After graduating, Hill returned to Los Angeles and studied at UCLA with Andrea Fraser and Jennifer Bolande.

== Work ==
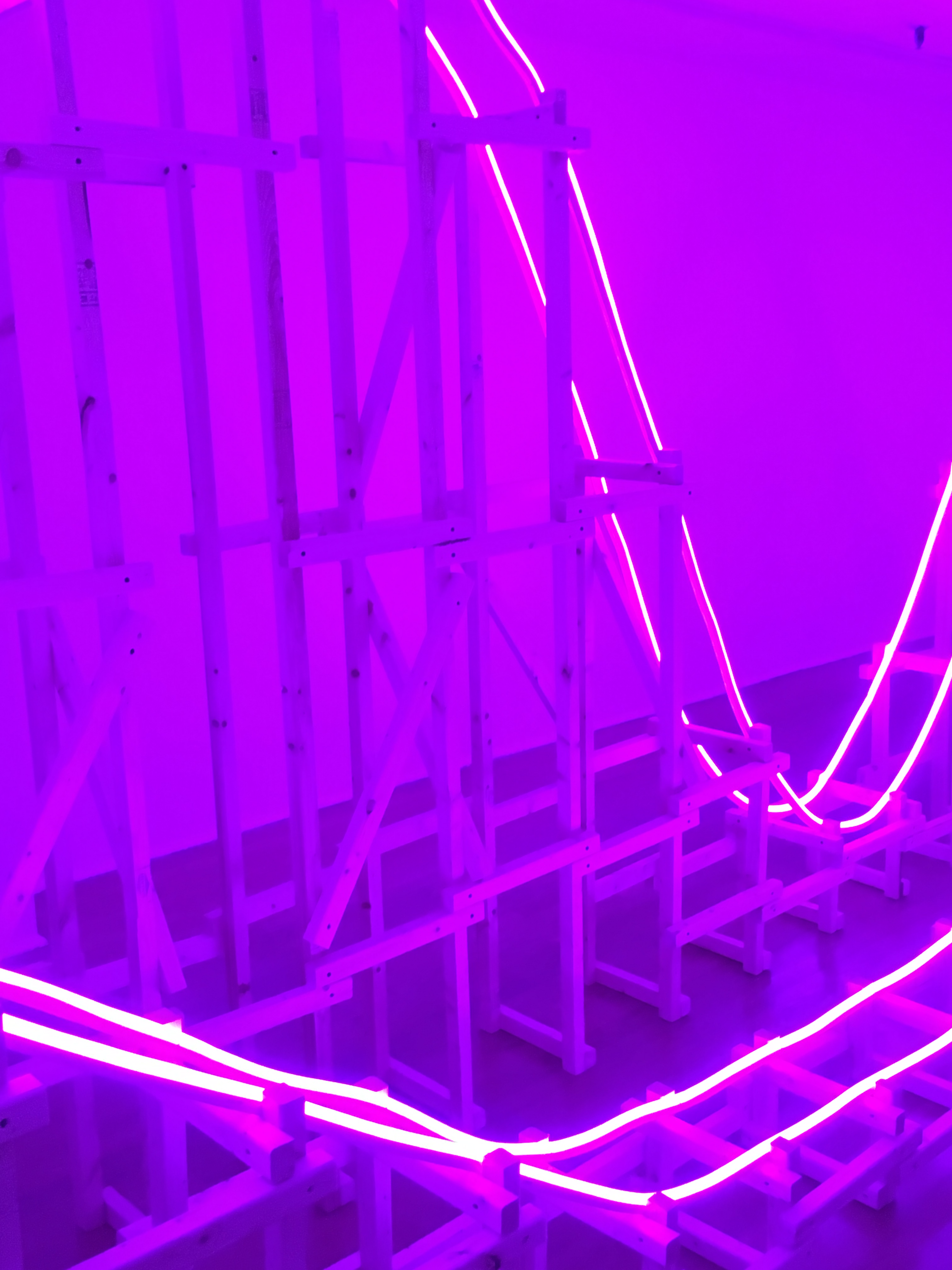
Ups and Downs work by EJ Hill

EJ Hill is known for his durational performances in which he performs a simple gesture for prolonged periods, often to the point of physical exhaustion. In 2016 the artist created "A Monumental Offer of Potential Energy" at the Studio Museum in Harlem. The work included a large wooden model roller coaster that Hill lay on at all times the museum was open during the three-month exhibition. In 2017 Hill was included in the Underground Museum's exhibition "Artists of Color".

In October 2022, Hill's exhibit "Brake Run Helix" at Massachusetts Museum of Contemporary Art opened, including a functional, human-carrying roller coaster created specifically for the museum. The roller coaster was fabricated by Skyline Attractions and is on show for two years alongside amusement park photography.

EJ Hill also works in collage, painting, writing and sculpture.

== Awards ==
In 2014 Hill received a Fellowship for Visual Artists, from the California Community Foundation in Los Angeles and the Teaching Artist Fellowship at the Armory Center for the Arts in Pasadena. In 2015 Hill was an Artist-in-Residence at The Studio Museum in Harlem in New York, was awarded the Fellowship for Visual Artists from the California Community Foundation in Los Angeles, and was nominated for the Rema Hort Mann Foundation Emerging Artist grant in Los Angeles. In 2016, Hill received the William H. Johnson Prize from the William H. Johnson Foundation for the Arts in Los Angeles. In 2017 Hill became the Artist-in-Residence at Praxis Studio at California State University in Dominguez Hills and has been shortlisted for the 2017 Future Generation Art Prize from the Victor Pinchuk Foundation in Kyiv. Hill received a Foundation for Contemporary Arts Grants to Artists award (2018). In 2018, Hill was awarded a 2018-2019 Radcliffe fellowship at the Harvard Radcliffe Institute.
