= Damali ayo =

American artist

damali ayo
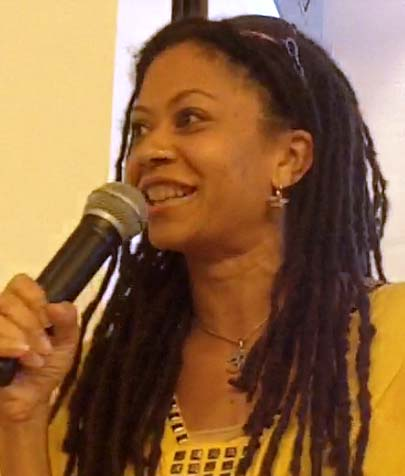
- Ayo at Greenlight Books in Brooklyn, 2010
- Born: Damali Ayo Patterson; February 26, 1972 (age 54); Washington, D.C.
- Occupations: Conceptual Artist, Author, Speaker
- Writing career
- Period: 1999 – 2017
- Website: damaliayo.com

damali ayo (born February 26, 1972) is an American conceptual artist, performance artist, and author. She created conceptual art from 1997 to 2017. She is of African-American, English, Italian, and Native American descent. She prefers her name in lower case. Her art used a range of mediums, including assemblage, collage, installation, audio, video, photography, new genres, writing, speaking, and performance.

== Early life ==
damali ayo was born Damali Ayo Patterson, February 26, 1972 in Washington, D.C. where she attended Sidwell Friends School from kindergarten through high school. She legally dropped her last name in 1995.

Ayo earned a Bachelor of Arts degree in 1990 from Brown University with a double concentration in Public Policy and American Civilization. Ayo moved to Portland, Oregon, in 1997. After establishing her career as a self-taught artist, she was invited to apply to Portland State University and earned a Master of Fine Arts in studio art in 2006.

== Visual and performance art ==
Ayo created work in the tradition of conceptual art. Her work displayed influences from artists such as Adrian Piper, Yoko Ono, On Kawara, and William Pope.L. She used a wide range of media and her work was frequently interactive. Her work utilized assemblage, collage, photography, installation, audio, video, new genres, writing, speaking, and performance. Ayo's art explored a variety of topics from love, to politics, to song lyrics. Her work often engaged social issues, ranging from race relations, to gender, to sexual assault, issues of existence, emotion, mortality, and invisibility.

Her 2003 web-art-performance, rent-a-negro.com is considered a pioneering work in the development of the genre of internet art and performance art. It received over 400,000 hits per day in its first month, and garnered global media attention. The piece was a satirical web site that examines racism in the interactions between black and white people. The site employed parody and satire to engage the viewer in an artificial premise that one could rent a black person for their personal entertainment or to advance their social clout. The site remained online until 2012.

Her 2000 show The Little Black Dress Project and accompanying performance Take it Off explored the notion of the reality of women's lives juxtaposed with the wardrobe of fashion conformity.

American/Girl was a post-9/11 stage performance exploration of patriotism, alienation, and belonging. Performed in Portland, Boulder, Syracuse, and at the 2004 International Geographic festival at Galerie SAW in Ottawa, Canada.

Her collaborative Flesh Tone #1: Skinned project where she visited various paint stores and asked them to mix paint to match various parts of her body won Second Prize Jurors' Award, Center on Contemporary Art in 2002. The accompanying radio piece based on the recordings of her interactions with the paint mixers aired on Public Radio International's Studio 360 in 2003.

In 2007 Ayo created an interactive guidebook titled You Can Fix Racism by asking the members of her email list for their top ten solutions to improve race relations. She created a lecture-performance to spread the solutions to communities nationwide.

Her 2004-10 street performance Living Flag: Panhandling for Reparations collected money from white passersby and paid those funds to black passersby. She performed the piece in Portland, Chicago, Boston, and New York. In 2006 ayo created an online kit that anyone could download and do the performance in their own community. Several hundred people participated across the country.

== Theatre ==
Ayo was one of four co-founders and Co-artistic Directors of the consensus-run defunkt theatre in Portland, OR in 2000. She served as the resident set designer winning Drammy Awards for her designs for David Mamet's The Woods and Mac Wellman's The Bad Infinity. She served as assistant director on three plays, and acted in one play in the role of Strophe in Phaedra's Love by Sarah Kane.

== Books ==
Ayo wrote two books of humorous social satire. How to Rent a Negro, is a satirical guidebook about race relations in the United States. It was granted a 2005 Honorable Mention in the Outstanding Book Awards from the Gustavus Myers Center for the Study of Bigotry and Human Rights. Obamistan! Land without Racism: Your Guide to the New America is a hypothetical exploration of what a post-racism country might be like, and what domino effect the end of racism would have on the United States as a whole. It proposes that everything from pollution to political prisoners to how food is talked about would change.

=== Books as author and contributor ===
- Obamistan! Land without Racism: Your Guide to the New America (2010, Lawrence Hill Books)
- How to Rent a Negro (2005, Lawrence Hill Books)
- How to Be Black by Bartunde Thurston (member of the “Black Panel”) (2012)
- Reality Radio: Telling True Stories in Sound by John Biewen (contributor) (2010)
- Tipping the Sacred Cow: The Best of LiP: Informed Revolt, 1996-2007 by Brian Awehali (contributor) (2007)
- Found II: More of the Best Lost, Tossed, and Forgotten Items from Around the World by Davy Rothbart (interviewed) (2006)
- The Sage Woman Cookbook (contributor) (1998)

== Radio ==
Ayo's stories for public radio explored the process of art making, social issues, environmental consciousness, her own identity transformations, and classical music. The stories aired on Public Radio International's Studio 360, NPR's Tell Me More, and NPR's State of the Re:Union. She contributed a radio essay to the 2008 reboot of the historic This I Believe Series. Her story “Living Flag” received a 2005 Silver Reel Award from the National Federation of Community Broadcasters.

=== Radio stories ===
- Becoming Multiracial NPR's State of the Re:Union (2014)
- Celebrate Obama but Acknowledge Us Too NPR's Tell Me More (2009)
- This I Believe: The Potential for a New Life This I Believe Series, aired on NPR's Tell Me More (2008)
- Living Flag Public Radio International's Studio 360 (2004)
- Beethoven's Fifth Public Radio International's Studio 360(2004)
- The Paint Mixers Public Radio International's Studio 360 (2003)
- Me and the Golliwog Public Radio International's Studio 360(2003)
- Trashed Public Radio International's Studio 360(2003)

== Eco-Fashion ==
The July 2008 issue of Redbook magazine reported that after a string of terrible on-line dates, ayo redirected her energies to "eco fitting" her house. During this time, she started CROW Clothing, an eco-friendly clothing company that also provided resources on health and social justice. CROW broke new ground by pricing their clothing on a sliding scale, allowing customers to choose the price they would pay for each garment. The company closed in November 2008 during the economic downturn.

== Speaking ==
As part of her body of art, ayo gave lectures and workshops on the artistic process as well as the social issues she has explored through her art. She reflected on her art and books about race and racism and the impact exploring that topic had on her life and career in a presentation titled Race Girl/Artistically Pigeon-holed: How one artist tackled race and how it tackled her.

She discussed the process of being a conceptual artist and engaging social issues through her lecture, You Have to Mess with People But Don't Let them Mess with You. She taught workshops on how to make conceptual art to people of all ages. In 2016, ayo completed her speaking work and subsequently removed the related website.
