= Victorine (opera) =

- Opera by Mayo Thompson
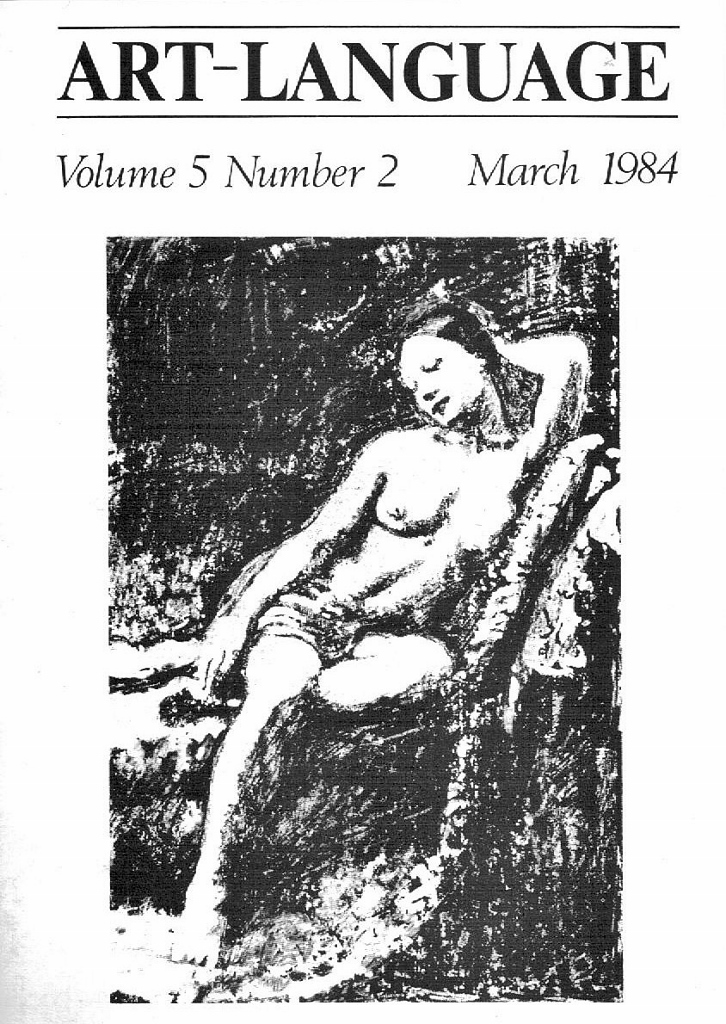
- Cover of Art-Language Volume 5 Number 2 by Art & Language showing a drawing of Victorine Meurent
- Librettist: Art & Language
- Language: English
- Premiere: 1982 (Cancelled); 2012; Documenta 7, Kassel; Whitney Museum, New York City

Victorine is a four-act detective opera by the british conceptual artists Art & Language. It was created in English in the summer of 1983 and published in the collective's journal, Art-Language, volume 5, n°2 of March 1984. The French translation of the opera was first published in 1993 by the Galerie nationale du Jeu de Paume on the occasion of the Art & Language exhibition.

== List of characters ==
- Inspector Denis
- Sergeant Nozière
- First Policeman
- Police Chorus
- Gustave Courbet
- Édouard Manet
- Monsieur Barbin, friend of Manet
- Victorine Meurend
- Jeanne, friend of Jean Fils Merlin
- Marianne Bricafere
- The concierge, 17 rue Maître-Albert
- Assorted leftists, Republicans in various groups
- Picas Osebracs, Informer
- Jean Fils Merlin, Informer, Agent and Flâneur
- Assorted leftists, Republicans in various groups
- Characters observed by Inspector Denis on the street near Courbet's Studio
- Inspector R. Janvin Rambrent, Fireman

== Argument ==
The action takes place in France, in Paris, at the end of the 19th century. This is a police investigation in which dream and illusion play an important role. Several women have been murdered. Gustave Courbet and Édouard Manet are the two main suspects.

=== Act I ===
In Paris 1865, in a police station, a vast rectangular room, Inspector Denis is leaning against a long counter. A second police officer is sitting in front of a desk. They're talking. Behind the counter, we see people who are constantly being marginalized and mistreated by the police. Inspector Denis describes the lifeless body of a young girl who has just been murdered. His identity is unknown. Inspector Denis decided to investigate in a place where the young girl was dating: the Café Vingt-et-Un. In this café, the customers are demi-mondaines, left-winged and strolling people with questionable morals. Inspector Denis shows Victorine Meurend a picture of the body, which, horrified, identifies her friend Virginie. Victorine denounces the Inspector's contempt for the demi-mondaines women of which she is a member:

Among those you despise, I am well known
And I can't stand your importuning tone.

—

At the police station, Sergeant Nozière and Inspector Denis linked this murder to a series of murders of young women. They speculate in order to find the motive for the crimes and the culprit. They allude to several works of art: Gustave Courbet's Les Demoiselles des Bords de la Seine and Manet's Olympia. They decide to question their informer, Picas Osebracs.

=== Act II ===
La Toilette de Vénus, de François Boucher

At the police station, Inspector Denis, Sergeant Nozière and a second police officer observe various images. They're still looking for the motive for the crime. The second police officer takes a photograph and shows it to Inspector Denis as if he was showing a drawing to a connoisseur. Allusion to François Boucher's La Toilette de Vénus. Conversation between Picas Osebracs, Inspector Denis and Sergeant Nozière. Picas Osebracs reveals to Inspector Denis that the murdered girl was not a prostitute but a model who posed for painters. A certain Jean Fils sends a ticket to Inspector Denis because he wants to meet him at 11 a.m. at the Café Vingt-et-Un. Inspector Denis decides to go there incognito. Jean Fils introduced himself with a girl. Jean Fils insinuates to Inspector Denis that Courbet is the guilty party.

Courbet destroyed, or so he once boasted,
Until he damages' debt was posted,
The Colonne Vendôme…

—

At the police station, at dawn, Inspector Denis asked his collaborators if they had found any clues about Courbet. In a file he discovers a writing from him: "Work it out who can!", an allusion to a letter from Courbet to his friend Louis Français in 1855 in which he refers to the painter's studio.

"It is a history of my studio, everything
That goes on there morally and physically,
All pretty mysterious...
Devinera qui pourra!" Mais je peux!

—

Inspector Denis decides to go to Courbet's workshop.

=== Act III ===
In a dark street in Paris, Inspector Denis and Sergeant Nozière are hidden in order to watch the entrance to Gustave Courbet's workshop. Sergeant Nozière evokes the notoriety of Courbet's work. Inspector Denis believes that these are political crimes executed by the Republicans. A man and a peasant holding a scythe enter. They mumble an unintelligible foreign language. Inspector Denis visits Courbet's workshop, which he entered without knocking. He decides to pretend to be the fire chief: Inspector R. Janvin Rambrent. This is an allusion to the painting Firemen running at the fire by Courbet. Begins a conversation between the painter and Inspector Denis. Courbet declares:

My life is forfeit to the masses' strife,
To resurgence - and to art.

—

Inspector Denis shows him a search warrant. He wants to search his workshop. Courbet unmasked Inspector Denis and discovered that he was a police officer. The Inspector asked him what his alibi was for the night of June 2, 1858. Courbet replied that he was hunting in Frankfurt. He then asked him for his alibi for February 10, 1849. Courbet states that he was then in Amsterdam. Finally, Inspector Denis asked him for his alibi for March 10 ten years earlier. Courbet replied that he was in Ornans where he was realising a painting from his studio.

A real allegory in which I show
The whole world come to be portrayed

—

Inspector Denis returns to the police station. A police report mentions Manet's name. In Manet's studio, he and his friend Mr Barbin contemplate Olympia. Inspector Denis broke into the studio and listened to them in secret. Inspector Denis then asked Manet to provide an alibi. Manet says he was painting. Victorine Meurend has to join him to pose in his studio. Courbet shows Inspector Denis the painting in his workshop. We see a woman lying there, Olympia. Confused, the Inspector sees in Olympia's painting a projection of the murder that Manet intends to commit. For him, Victorine is in danger of death. Jean Fils arrives in Manet's studio. He describes Victorine as an embodiment of modernity:

The core and skin of our civility.

—

Finally, Inspector Denis excludes Manet as a suspect.

=== Act IV ===
Victorine Meurend talks with her friend Marianne Bricafère in her apartment at 17 rue Maître-Albert. They talk about their friend Virginie's sad fate. The janitor enters and tells Victorine that the police are looking for her because she would be in danger of death. The act ends with an aria "What can I say to these crazy police?"

in which Victorine concludes by saying that the crime is that of jouissance.

What shall I say
To these crazy police?
I could turn my head
With a look that defies,
And in killing his pleasure
Be dead in his eyes.

—

== Musical score ==
Victorine's musical score is written by Mayo Thompson, leader of the American experimental rock group Red Krayola who has been collaborating regularly with Art & Language since the 1970s. It remains unfinished to this day.

== Opera performances ==
Initially, Victorine was to be performed in the city of Cassel, Germany for documenta 7 in 1982 and shown alongside Art & Language Studio at 3 Wesley Place; Painted by Actors. The performance was to be filmed by a German television channel, but the project was not successful. A unique performance of Victorine's Act IV was given in 2012, during the biennale of the Whitney Museum of American Art, where Felix Bernstein performed Victorine and Gabe Rubin, his friend Marianne Bricafère. A capture of this representation is shown at the Château de Montsoreau - Museum of Contemporary Art in the hanging of the museum's permanent collection.
