= Ronald Jones (interdisciplinarian) =

American artist, critic, and educator

Ronald Jones (July 8, 1952 – August 9, 2019) was an American artist, critic and educator who gained prominence in New York City during the mid-1980s. In the magazine Contemporary, Brandon Labelle wrote: "Working as an artist, writer, curator, professor, lecturer and critic over the last 20 years, Jones is a self-styled Conceptualist, spanning the worlds of academia and art, opera and garden design, and acting as paternal spearhead of contemporary critical practice. Explorative and provocative, Jones creates work that demands attention that is both perceptual and political." Labelle positions Jones along the leading edge of a "contemporary critical practice" that is perhaps best described as interdisciplinary or transdisciplinary.

== 1980s ==
Jones graduated in 1974, with a Bachelor of Arts degree from Montgomery, Alabama's Huntingdon College. He completed an MFA degree in sculpture from the University of South Carolina, followed by a Ph.D. in interdisciplinary arts at Ohio University where he wrote about a collaboration between Samuel Beckett and Marcel Duchamp. In 1983, he was included in a group exhibition titled "A Likely Story," at Artists space in New York City which was curated by Valerie Smith and included Gretchen Bender, David Cabrera, and Jeff Koons. In 1985 he moved to New York City and two years later had his first solo exhibition at Metro Pictures Gallery. In the New York Times, Roberta Smith wrote: "Mr. Jones's main goal seems to be to thwart the eye with formal incoherence and an overload of written information that the mind must digest before his pieces make sense. But the sense made is never visual. Instead, if one wades through the long illustrated paragraph that constitutes each work's title, learning the artwork or event that each component represents, a kind of odd and often frightening poetic logic accrues." Jones is represented by Metro Pictures Gallery where his last of six solo shows was in 1998.

Jones began his curatorial practice in 1986, when he assembled The Public Art Show with a catalog designed by Louise Lawler and a poster by Barbara Kruger. He went on to organize eleven exhibitions for New York City galleries (Metro Pictures, Lehmann Maupin and Josh Baer) and European and Scandinaviany institutions ("Dark Side of the Moon," Stockholm Cultural Capital of Europe Arkipelag project, 1998 and Magasin 3 Projekt Djurgårdsbrunn, 2003).

In 1987, he began writing criticism for Arts Magazine and Artscribe. Soon after, he began contributing articles, essays and reviews to Frieze, Artforum, Bookforum, Art in America, Parkett, Cabinet, Zone and others. Jones wrote numerous catalogs for other artists including Elizabeth Peyton, Laurie Simmons, David Salle, Terry Winters, Richard Phillips, Carroll Dunham, and Keith Edmier.

In 1989 Jones was invited to join the faculty at the School of Art, Yale University as Critic in Sculpture and ultimately was named Senior Critic.

== 1990s ==
In 1992 Jones served as the spokesman for the National Endowment of the Arts peer-review panel for fellowships in sculpture, which launched one of many high-profile national debates on censorship and First Amendment issues in the arts. Jones later served on a think-tank at the Woodrow Wilson School of Public and International Affairs at Princeton University which considered the future of culture in the United States in light of a diminished National Endowment of the Arts.

In 1993 he had a solo exhibition at the Sonnabend Gallery in New York City. As his work continued to be exhibited internationally (including solo exhibitions in Berlin, Tokyo, Los Angeles, Paris, and Cologne) Jones was commissioned to design garden projects including Pritzker Park in Chicago, the Rethymnon Centre of Contemporary Art in Crete, the Botanical Gardens in Curitiba, Brazil, Caesar's Cosmic Garden Boras Konstmuseet, Sweden and a garden for the city of Hamburg, Germany among others.

In 1995, ArtForum magazine's "Best and Worst 1995" article stated that Jones should be "a nominee for a lifetime achievement award for contemporary-art awfulness."

In 1998 he was appointed professor and chairman of the visual arts department at Columbia University. At Columbia he was the director of the digital media center and co-director of the interactive design lab. While at Columbia he served on the faculty of the MA Colloquia in the masters program in critical studies, department of art history and archeology and taught in seminars at the computer music department. He continued to serve as a visiting professor at Konstfack, University College of Arts, Crafts and Design, in Stockholm, Sweden, which he had done since 1996. He served on the boards of Artists Space, the Public Art Fund, and Franklin Furnace, all in New York City, the Princeton Sculpture Symposium, and was a member of the executive committee of the Lucent Project, Brooklyn Academy of Music.

In 1999, Jones conceived of, and wrote the libretto for "Falling and Waving," the first computer generated opera produced by the Brooklyn Academy of Music and Arts at Saint Ann's in New York City.

== 2000s ==
In 2001 he was appointed as the first provost at Art Center College of Design, where he guided the design and implementation of a new transdisciplinary curriculum for the college.

In 2002, he earned a certificate from the Harvard University Graduate School of Education.

Jones became professor of interdisciplinary studies at Konstfack University College of Arts, Crafts and Design in Stockholm, Sweden where he led The Experience Design Group, with a mission "to persuade, stimulate, inform, envision, entertain, and forecast events, influencing meaning and modifying human behavior." At Konstfack, Jones also co-directs WIRE, the MA program in curatorial practice and critical writing. Jones was a center director at Konstfack for the Stockholm School of Entrepreneurship (SSES), an interdisciplinary initiative by Karolinska Institutet, the Royal Institute of Technology, the Stockholm School of Economics, the Stockholm University and Konstfack.

Jones was a guest professor of experience design at NID, the National Institute of Design, Ahmedabad, India. He also served on the faculty of The Royal Danish Academy of Art, Copenhagen, The School of Visual Arts, New York, and Staatliche Hochschule für Bildende Künste, Städelschule Frankfurt, Germany and as a visiting professor at Bezalel Academy of Art and Design, Israel's national school of art. With his appointment at Konstfack as professor of interdisciplinary studies, he was able, along with the faculty of The Experience Design Group, to create a graduate program especially designed to prepare students to become interdisciplinarians, or even transdisciplinarians. "Interdisciplinarity," said Jones "is by now a stand-alone discipline, as much as the conventional disciplines of art, design or craft."

== Writing, lectures, collections ==
Jones wrote regularly for Artforum and had a monthly column for Frieze.

He delivered over two hundred lectures to universities, museums, art and design schools, including Harvard University, The Art Institute of Chicago, Yale University, The Whitechapel Art Gallery, London, The Whitney Museum of American Art, The Guggenheim Museum, The Rhode Island School of Design, Parsons School of Design, DIA Center for the Arts, New York City, Royal College of Art, London, Center for Advanced Studies in the Visual Arts at MIT, Carnegie Mellon University, Brown University, Akademie Der Bildenden Künste, Vienna, the Architectural Association School of Architecture, London, among others.

His art is in the permanent collections of the Museum of Modern Art, the Whitney Museum of American Art, the Guggenheim Museum, The Metropolitan Museum of Art, The Museum of Contemporary Art, Los Angeles, and the Moderna Museet, Stockholm, among others.
