= Roger Welch =

American Artist

- Born: February 10, 1946; Westfield, New Jersey, U.S.
- Died: December 29, 2022 (aged 76); New York City, U.S.
- Education: Miami (Ohio) University, Art Institute of Chicago
- Known for: Conceptual art, installation art, video art
- Movement: Conceptual art

William Roger Welch (February 10, 1946 - December 29, 2022) was an American conceptual artist, installation artist and video artist.

== Biography ==
Roger Welch was born in Westfield, New Jersey in 1946 and graduated from Westfield High School in 1964. He received a scholarship in 1963 to the Interlochen Center for the Arts as a percussionist. The following year he was awarded the John Philip Sousa Band Award given to the school's most outstanding musician. After High School, Welch attended York College of Pennsylvania for one year before transferring to Miami University in Oxford Ohio. At Miami University, he studied art under Robert Wolfe Jr. and Crossan Curry. Welch also played drums with the University band and orchestra, as well as professionally with jazz ensembles and a soul band.

During his senior year of college, Welch dedicated himself to an art career. His influences included Frank Stella, Kenneth Noland and the shaped canvas paintings of Charles Hinman. In the summer of 1968 he won a scholarship to the Kent State University Blossom Art Program and studied under Op-Artist Richard Anuszkiewicz. In the fall of that year, Welch had his first solo show of minimalist paintings at the Western College Art Museum in Oxford, Ohio. At the same time, he studied the Earthworks and Non-Sites of Robert Smithson and was also influenced by a personal meeting with conceptual artist Douglas Huebler. In 1969, Welch began graduate studies at the School of the Art Institute of Chicago in the sculpture department headed by James Zanzi.

In his first year in Chicago, Welch pursued new forms of art including Conceptual and Performance Art. One of his first student works was High Jump in which he invited a national champion high jumper to attempt a world record in the sculpture studio of the Art Institute. He also created Mississippi River Measure by measuring a frozen section of the river with lengths of his outstretched body. Both works were documented in the art publication Interfunktionen. In 1969, Welch visited artist Dennis Oppenheim in his Brooklyn studio. The encounter formed the basis of a lifelong friendship.

In 1970, Welch received a scholarship to the Whitney Museum Independent Study Program in New York. That summer, he worked at the Parrish Art Museum in Southampton, New York where he organized an exhibition of Earthworks. As a result, Welch met Robert Smithson and became friendly with Nancy Holt, Jonas Jonas and Richard Serra.

== Work ==
From 1971 to 1972, Welch created performance works at 112 Greene Street and had his first significant one-person exhibition at 98 Greene Street, an alternative art space run by Holly Solomon. Among his friends and colleagues at this time were Bill Beckley, Les Levine, Gordon Matta-Clark, William Wegman, and Hannah Wilke. Welch also began to work primarily in multi-media and created a three-channel video Passing On. In 1972, Welch had solo exhibitions at Sonnabend Gallery in Paris, Konrad Fischer in Düsseldorf and Yaki Kornblit-Galerie 20 in Amsterdam.

During his 1973 solo exhibition at the John Gibson Gallery in New York, Welch produced a series of maps drawn from the childhood memories of four elderly people. On consecutive Saturday afternoons over the course of the exhibition, Welch engaged in a dialogue with each person about her or his hometown while he created drawings and a map from their verbal recollections. Visitors could attend the sessions and view previously completed maps and drawings.

This exhibit was followed by a solo show at the Milwaukee Art Museum which featured the Kitty Ewens Memory Map. The work was created from the childhood recollections of Kitty Ewens, a 101-year-old resident of the Milwaukee area. The Memory Maps attracted the attention of social psychologists such as Stanley Milgram with whom Welch collaborated in a 1975 exhibition at the Piltzer Gallery in Paris.

Beginning in 1974, Welch devised the video installation The Roger Woodward Niagara Falls Project also known as The Niagara Falls Project. The work was completed in 1975 and exhibited at the Steffanoty Gallery in New York. Two subsequent video installations, Preliminaries, exhibited in New York at the M.L. D'Arc Gallery in 1976 and the O. J. Simpson Project at the Albright-Knox Art Gallery in Buffalo, New York extended his explorations in multi-media. In 2008, The O. J. Simpson Project was exhibited at the Museo Nacional Centro de Arte Reina Sofia in Madrid.

At the beginning of the 1980s, Welch created two film and sculpture installations, Drive-In, shown at MoMA PS1, Long Island City, New York, in 1980 and Drive-In: Second Feature shown at the Whitney Museum of American Art in 1982. John Hanhardt, Whitney Museum Curator of Film and Video, selected Welch's work to inaugurate The New American Film Makers Series. Drive-In: Second Feature has been exhibited in museums and public institutions in the United States, Europe and, in 2007, at the Museum of Contemporary Art, Shanghai, China. Drive-In is in the collection of the Tamayo Contemporary Art Museum in Mexico City and Drive-In: Second Feature is in the collection of the Solomon R. Guggenheim Museum in New York.

In 1985, Welch was invited to participate in the Construction in Process II exhibition in Munich and created the video The Voice of Clint Eastwood in Germany. For this project, Welch dialogued with German actors who dub English language films and shot additional video with sound engineers at the Bavaria Film Studio.

While teaching at the University of Texas at Austin in 1990, Welch created photo portraits of elementary school children in Austin on the theme of what each wanted to be when they grew up and their visions of the future. The Austin Children series was exhibited at the Liverpool Gallery in Brussels in 1991. In the mid-1990s Welch made a series of photos with frames that structurally mimic the pose or movement of the subject. Of these works, his largest photo installation, The History of Design was completed in 2000 and exhibited at the Neuberger Museum of Art in Purchase, New York. The History of Design is a 48 ft. wide Parthenon-like pediment framing life-size photo images of young workers in the process of constructing a wall.

== Recent Work ==
Beginning in 2003, Welch produced a series of sculptures, watercolors such as Yankee Stadium in Meteor Crater, and videos juxtaposing landscapes or combining geologic formations with contemporary man-made structures. For the HD video Laguna Sagaponack, Welch shot Laguna Beach on the Pacific Ocean and Sagaponack, Long Island on the Atlantic. At each location, Welch mounted a camera in a pre-determined position before dawn then shot selectively throughout the day and into the night. The real-time video is edited from several hours to a few minutes presenting the illusion of natural time. The two places were combined in a soft-split screen to appear as a continuous panoramic landscape. For the exhibition Domicile in 2006, French art critic Pierre Tillet wrote: Welch deals with the visual and emotional closeness of distant spaces.

The video Hudson River was exhibited at the Kinz Tillou Feigen Gallery, New York in 2008. Two Coasts was exhibited at the Musée d'Art Moderne, Saint-Etienne, France in 2006 together with watercolors and studies for future video projects. The Ground Under My Studio, a watercolor, was included in the Watercolor Worlds exhibition at the Dorsky Gallery in Long Island City, New York in 2004. The O. J. Simpson Project was exhibited at the Minneapolis Institute of the Arts in 2012. A portion of Roger Welch's 1977 interview with O. J. Simpson appears in the first part of the 2017 Academy Award winning documentary O.J.: Made in America.

== Sources ==
- John Hanhardt, Image World, Exhibition Catalogue, essay by, pg. 106 ill., Whitney Museum of American Art, New York, NY 1990.
- Andy Grunberg, Photography and Art: Interactions Since 1946, (Exhibition Catalogue), Cross River Press Ltd. and Abbeville Press, New York 1987, p. 140; ill p. 159.
- John Yau, "Roger Welch" (Review), Art Forum, Summer 1986, New York, p. 121.
- Wolfgang Längsfeld, Das Automovil in der Kunst 1886–1986, (Exhibition Catalogue) Haus der Kunst, Münich, Germany 1986, p. 206.
- John Hanhardt, "Roger Welch: Drive-In:Second Feature", The New American Filmmakers Series, Number 1, Whitney Museum of American Art 1982.
- Mary Delahoyd, A New Beginning: 1968–78, Exhibition Catalogue, Hudson River Museum, Feb. 3–May 5, 1985, Yonkers, New York, essay by Mary Delahoyd, p. 112, 113.
- San Francisco Video Festival Journal, Roger Welch, Antoní Muntadas, and Andy Kaufman (Exhibition Catalogue), pub. by San Francisco Video Festival 1984, The Video Gallery, San Francisco.
- Hal Himmelstein, Karen Nulf, and Larry Shirley "Personalized Television: Interview with Roger Welch" by Hal Himmelstein, Wide Angle: Film Quarterly, vol. 5, #3, 1983, pp. 70, 74–79.
- Ann-Sargent Wooster, "Roger Welch's Drive In: Second Feature", AfterImage, Dec., 1982, vol. 10, #5, p. 17; pub. by Visual Studies Workshop, Rochester, N.Y.
- Shelley Rice "Drive-In", ArtForum, March, 1981, vo. XIX, #7, pp. 88–89.
- Roberta Smith, Four Artists and the Map, (Exhibition Catalogue), Spencer Museum of Art, the University of Kansas, Lawrence, Kansas, pp. 14, 15, 16, 32–35.
- Mary Delahoyd and Jackie Apple, Alternatives in Retrospect, Exhibition Catalogue, pp. 12, 20, 30, 35.
- Peter Frank, Mapped Art, (Exhibition Catalogue), pub. Independent Curators, Inc., New York and the University of Colorado Art Gallery.
- Carrie Rickey, "Roger Welch", Artes Visuales, #27–28 (double issue), March, 1981, Mexico City, pp. 75, 77, 78.
- Jeffrey Deitch, Lives, (Exhibition Catalogue), The Fine Arts Building, New York, published 1975.
- James Collins, "Roger Welch" (Welch film review), Artforum, April 1974, pg. 78- 79, ill. 79.
- George R. Collins, Unbuilt America, Allison Sky and Michelle Stone, Site Inc., Published by McGraw Hill Book Co. 1976, page 9, pg. 250.
- Berta Sichel, First Generation: Art and the Moving Image (1963–1986), page 33, 344-347 ill., Museo Nacional Centro de Arte Reina Sofia, Madrid, 2007.
- Frank Popper, Art-Action and Participation, New York University Press, New York, 1975, 261- 263 ill.
- Stanley Milgram, The Individual in a Social World, Addison Wesley pub. 1977. page 22.
- Helen Hsu, "Everything is Problemized", Art In America Now, Museum of Contemporary Art, Shanghai, China, 2007, pg. 25, 64-65 ill.
