= Greer Honeywill =

Australian conceptual artist

- Born: 1945 (age 80–81); Adelaide, South Australia
- Education: South Australian School of Art; Monash University (PhD in Fine Art); University of Tasmania (PhD)
- Known for: Conceptual art, sculptural conventions, autobiography, critical thinking, stage design
- Awards: Mollie Holman Medal (2003)

Greer Honeywill - Off the Plan - 2009 (wood, found object, horse's tail)

Greer Honeywill (born 1945 in Adelaide, South Australia) is an Australian conceptual artist. Her work covers sculptural conventions, autobiography and critical thinking.

== Life and education ==
Born the daughter of Donald Desmond Spooner (1910–1989), a classical pianist who studied for a short time at the Elder Conservatorium of Music, University of Adelaide before becoming a self-taught realist painter. From 1956 Spooner exhibited regularly at the Walter Wotzke Gallery, Hahndorf, South Australia, and the Royal South Australian Society of Arts. He won the Maude Vizard-Wholohan Prize in 1955 and became a Fellow of the RSASA in 1958.

Honeywill studied art at the South Australian School of Art and Western Teachers College (now University of South Australia) graduating as an art teacher in 1964. She continued her studies in drama at Adelaide Teachers College in 1967 (now University of South Australia). In 2003 she graduated from Monash University, PhD in Fine Art and was awarded the Mollie Holman Medal for academic excellence.

In August 2015 Greer Honeywill was awarded her second PhD, from the University of Tasmania. Her thesis was titled The Ever Present Eye.

== Early work ==
Between 1963 and 1976 Honeywill worked as stage designer in Adelaide. She designed Eureka Stockade for the University of Adelaide Theatre Guild and the 1976 production of Jumpers, both Adelaide Fringe Festival productions. In 1974 she joined the founding committee for the Come Out Festival, part of the Adelaide Festival of Arts. Between 1974 and 1981 she created and directed six large-scale, multidisciplinary works. Pageant (1977) and Perambulations Games (1979) were televised by ABC TV. Her production, The Arts Circus (1979), was critically acclaimed. The Human Chess Tournament (1975) exploring human relationships through the medium of live chess, was staged in the Amphitheatre of the Adelaide Festival Centre before becoming part of a new music concert in The Space. Composer, Malcolm Fox (1946–1997) created Cheque Mate, a musical contest between two groups of musicians dependent on the movement of the live chess pieces. The Human Chess Tournament was the first non-music event staged in the amphitheatre at the Adelaide Festival Centre. The Adelaide Festival, 1976, commissioned Super Scrabble for the amphitheatre. British actor John Stride (playing Coriolanus for The South Australian Theatre Company's Adelaide Festival production), officiated as The Adjudicator.

Honeywill resigned from the South Australian Education Department in 1982.

== Work ==
Greer Honeywill relocated to Melbourne, 1990. She joined a shared studio space, '308B at Sydney Road' in Brunswick, Victoria, 1991–1998 with painter David Disher, (winner of the Sulman Prize, 2007), Judy Horocek, cartoonist, artist, writer and children's book creator and Michael Pearce, artist and stage designer. The major work from this period was the collaborative The Great Australian Dream Exhibition, exhibited at Gallery 101, Melbourne in 1995.

In 1998, Greer Honeywill returned to research-based studies at Monash University, Melbourne. Her PhD focused on three decades of human interaction, social patterning, child's play and reflections from her suburban childhood. Dr Susan Sidlauskas, now Professor 19th Century, Rutgers, University of New Jersey described the exegesis accompanying the body of work as a…fascinating hybrid of academic research, oral history, social analysis, artistic imagination, autobiography and archiving". According to Sidlauskas, "It was quite unlike anything I had read before, but I was completely impressed by the author’/artist’s breadth of research and artistic imagination".

In 2003 Honeywill was awarded a PhD in fine art by Monash University, Melbourne. Since 2003 Honeywill's work has ranged from large-scale outdoor installations to more formal plinth based sculptural objects and wall mounted text based works. Her interest in distillation, repetition, modularity and generative processes provides, says Professor Carol Shepheard, an understanding of how history, society and culture impact the human condition.

Greer Honeywill relocated to Tasmania in 2010 and in late 2011 commenced a second PhD at the University of Tasmania, awarded in August 2015.

In 2016, she returned to Melbourne, where she now lives.

== Awards ==
- 2000 Allport Writing Award (Textile Fibre Forum magazine)
- 2002 Coates and Wood Foundry Prize
- 2002 Monash University, Doctoral Completion Scholarship
- 2003 Yering Station Sculpture Prize
- 2003 World Sculpture News Prize
- 2003 Mollie Holman Academic Medal, Monash University
- 2005 Invited installation artist, Castlemaine State Festival, Post Office Installation Series
- 2006 Arts Victoria, Arts Development Grant
- 2008 Mitchell Family Award, (Montalto Sculpture Prize)
- 2008 Inaugural artist in residence, Carr Design Group, Melbourne
- 2009 Sunshine Coast Art Prize, Commended Award
