= Margaret Noble (artist) =

American conceptual artist (born 1972)

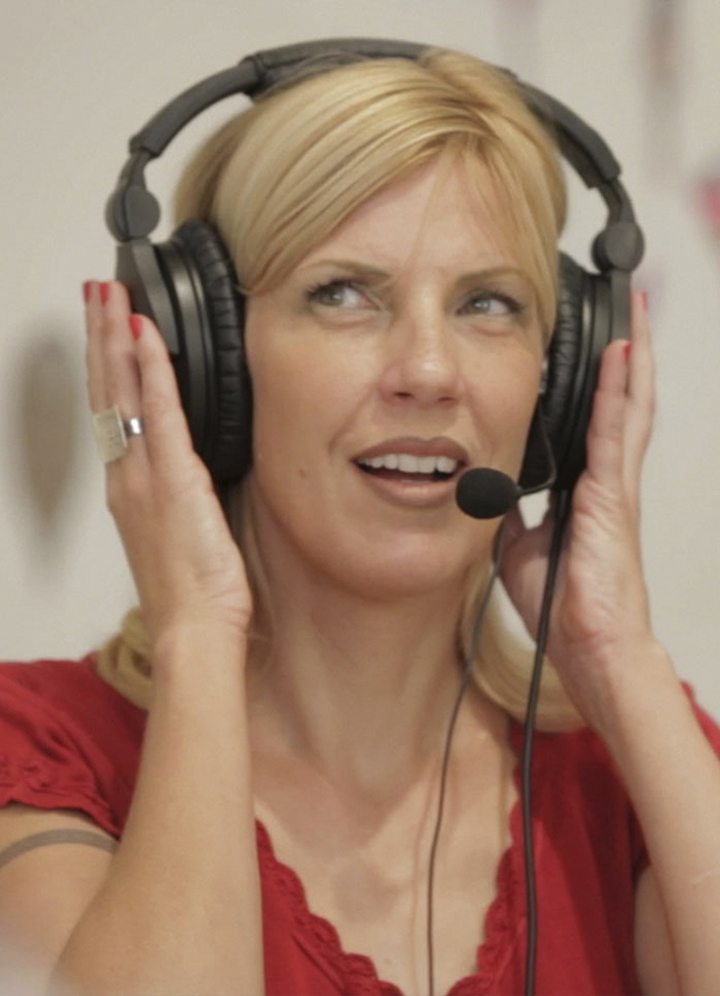
- Noble in 2012
- Born: 1972 (age 53–54); Waco, Texas, U.S.
- Education: University of California, San Diego (BA); School of the Art Institute of Chicago (MFA)
- Movement: Sound art Installation art Sound sculpture
- Website: margaretnoble.com

Margaret Noble (born 1972) is an American conceptual artist, sound artist, installation artist, teacher and electronic music composer.

== Early life and education ==
The daughter of artist Jill Hosmer, Noble was born in Waco, Texas, and grew up in the City Heights neighborhood of San Diego, moving there in 1982 at the age of 9. Her youth in City Heights has been described as "dependent on welfare, captivated by hip-hop and dance music, among racially diverse neighbors." Immersed in 1990s rave culture, Noble learned to DJ for clubs and parties. She earned a BA in philosophy from the University of California at San Diego in 2002, and an MFA in sound art at the School of the Art Institute of Chicago in 2007.

== Career ==
As a house music disc jockey, Noble performed at underground clubs internationally and in Chicago, Illinois, where she spent five years as a DJ. In 2007, she moved to San Diego to teach media production at High Tech High School in Point Loma while continuing her sound art practice.

She collaborated in 2011 with math teacher David Stahnke in the "Illuminated Mathematics" project, winning second place in knowledge building and critical thinking, among twelve educators who represented the U.S. at Microsoft's Global Learning Forum. They went on to win first place in "Knowledge Building and Critical Thinking" category of the Global Forum Educator Awards.

In 2021, Noble began teaching 12th grade Digital Art at High Tech High Mesa. Her students engage in community-based art as well as learn coding, animation, and explore digital design.

=== Frakture (2009-10) ===
Noble's Frakture, a remix of a 1953 vinyl recording of George Orwell's novel Nineteen Eighty-Four, is an "eight-track audio collage of analog synthesizer, acoustic drums, recordings of healthcare protests, contemporary political propaganda, emergency alarms, the New York Stock Exchange, dice rolling" and other sounds. On the recording, Noble reads excerpts from the text of the novel.

=== Sound art and installations (2012-present) ===
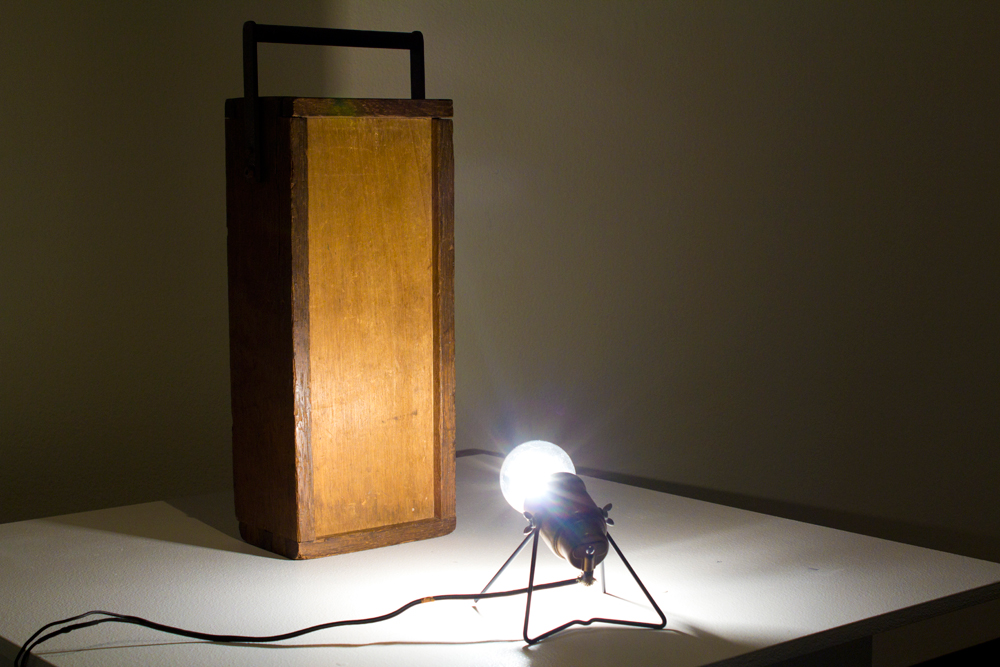
What Lies Beneath, by Margaret Noble

Noble's installation 44th and Landis opened in 2012 at the Museum of Contemporary Art San Diego. The large-scale multimedia art piece combined Victorian-style paper dolls with 1980s urban influences based on her upbringing in San Diego's City Heights neighborhood, and included a performance by Noble. The show's visual centerpiece was a hanging series of 100 paper dolls, along with paper-doll clothing, objects and architecture. In her 2016 interactive piece "What Lies Beneath", she worked in sound sculpture, creating a tall wooden box with instructions next to it to raise the lid, which caused sounds of organ pipes, truck brakes and other dissonance to emit. The person interacting with it controlled the sound with the lid, with a "storm" inside the box.

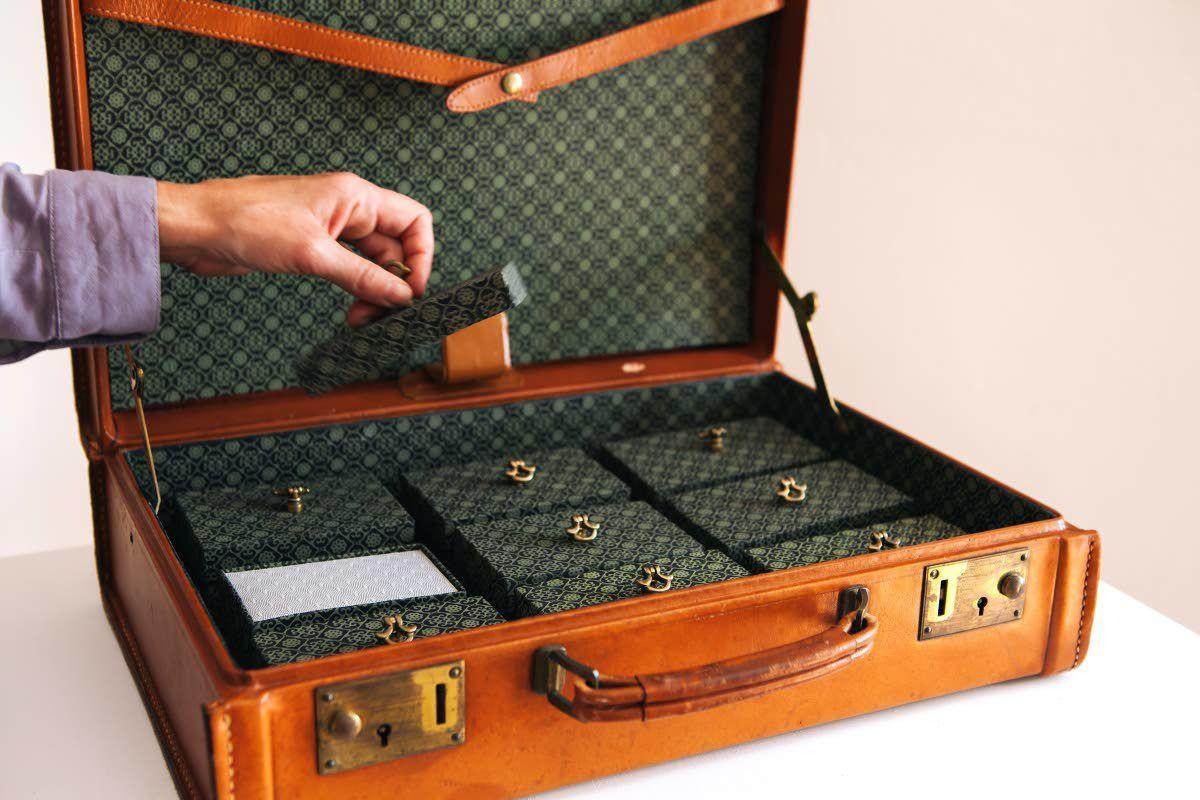
I Long to Be Free from Longing, by Margaret Noble

Her "Head in the Sand" is a wooden box sitting on four legs with a head-sized hole in the top and instructions to visitors to place their heads in the hole and wait. Inside is a chambered light and sound show with soft pastoral sounds, the hole serving as a sanctuary from the art exhibit itself. "Head in the Sand" was included in her 2016 exhibition Resonating Object, an interactive mixture of sound, sculpture and videos, at South Puget Sound Community College in Olympia, Washington. The exhibition also included "I Long to Be Free From Longing" and "Material Shrine for the New Class", featuring dangling objects the visitor could squeeze to activate different sounds. Her 2014 interactive sound installation "I Long to Be Free From Longing" won first place in the 23rd annual Juried Exhibition at the Athenaeum Music & Arts Library in San Diego.

Noble's 2016 sound art installation Time Strata, a public art commission for the Port of San Diego at the Cesar Chavez Park pier, consisted of three sound sculptures made of materials including vintage buoys, hunks of bamboo, bells, stainless steel and harp strings, along with sounds of creatures like snapping shrimp in the water under the pier. Microphones placed around the pier fed the sound into a mixer and then into four digital consoles where participants could sample and alter the sounds.

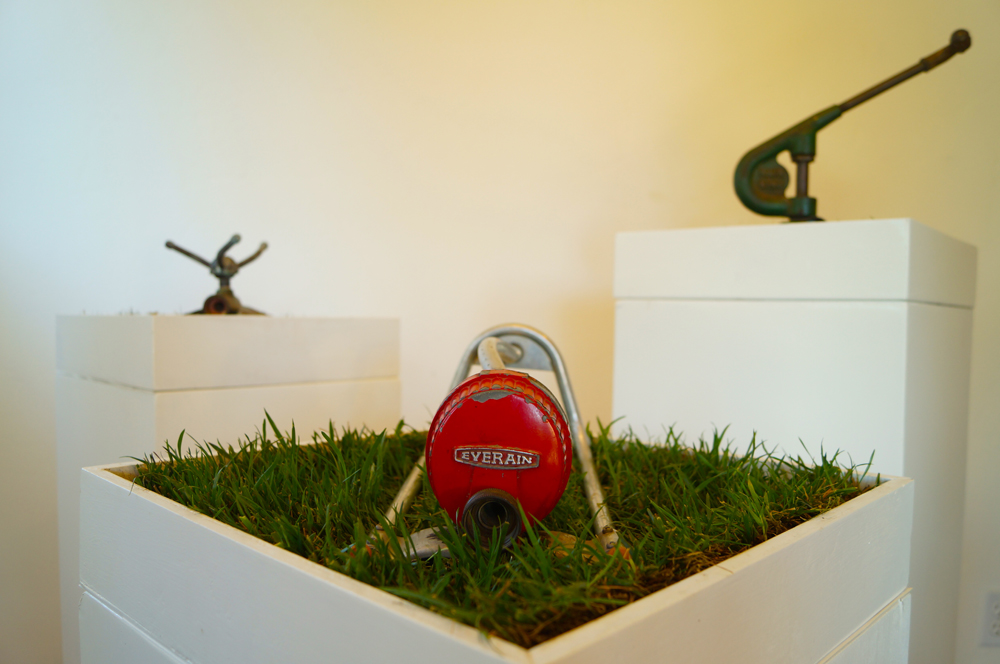
I Have Arrived, by Margaret Noble

For The Collector, Noble worked with puppeteers Animal Cracker Conspiracy and visual directors Bridget Rountree and Iain Gunn, creating a multi-layered soundscape that used animated video, live video projection and puppetry to tell a story of a debt collector. Righteous Exploits, a 2013 experimental performance created with Justin Hudnall, used a combination of live audio and video multimedia and performance art.

Her 2018 installations of Resonating Objects included "lawn sprinklers sitting on grass-covered pedestals, playing their percussive, shimmering, water-spraying sounds", entitled "I Have Arrived", which explores the use of expendable resources on lawns, or status symbols.

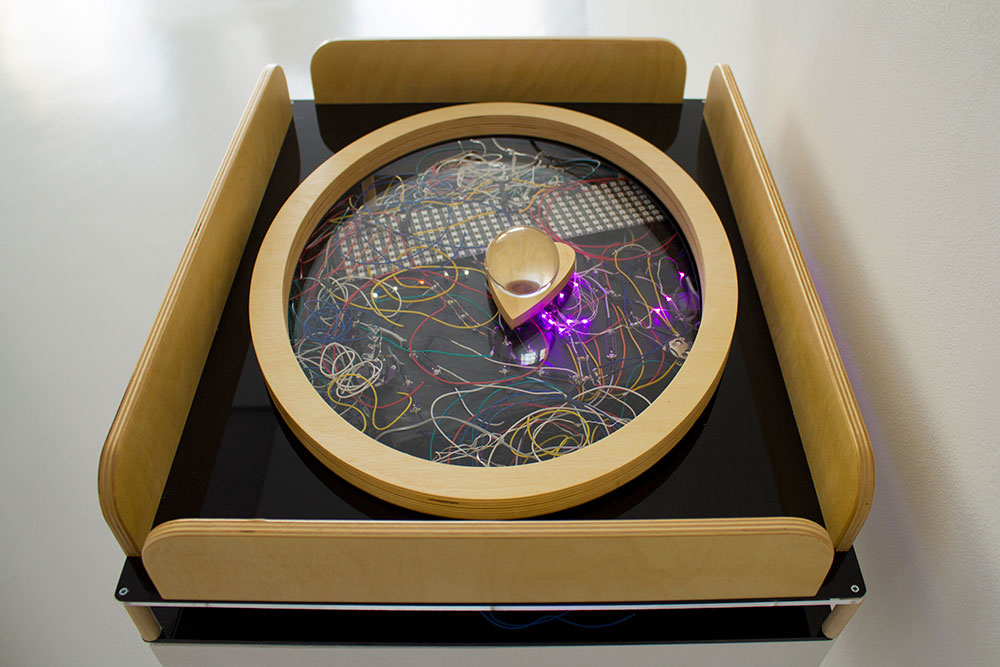
A Shit Pile of Lights and Sounds for Your Pleasure, by Margaret Noble

Two other pieces are "Scaled Discords, 2015", with spinning tops representing "power structures, resource allocation and racial inequality in America", and "A Shit Pile of Lights and Sounds for Your Pleasure" consisting of "mash-up of Lite Brite, a Ouija board, and an early Akai sampler".

Noble’s piece, Elsewhere (2022), appeared in the San Diego Public Library’s 2023 exhibition, Good Natured. This installation features a live-video feed projection of 50 "natural landscapes and wildlife habitats around the world." The locations change randomly and align with the current season. Good Natured also included Noble’s work, Convenience Atrocities (2023). This piece includes "48 vacation-styled postcards that explore the tensions in our desire for ease and convenience in daily life."

In 2025, Margaret Noble featured in Land and Sea: Selections from the Collection at the Museum of Contemporary Art San Diego. Her piece titled Horizon (2024) is a live-feed video installation of an artificial sunset. Noble experimented with different materials in a fish tank to achieve this illusion. In an interview with The San Diego Union Tribune, Noble explains she wanted to explore “the way technology simultaneously distorts and enhances our understanding of the world around us, making us question what is authentic versus what is constructed.”

== Critical reception ==
Noble's art has been presented on PBS and reviewed favorably in Art Ltd. Magazine, The San Diego Union-Tribune, and San Francisco Weekly. Thomas Larson of the San Diego Reader wrote that "enlarging the sensorium of art with sound begins with disorder," but while visual art may be viewed with "one or one hundred other hushed-up viewers," sound art is more like "a Fourth-of-July picnic, Charles-Ives polyphony, a resolute disequilibrium".

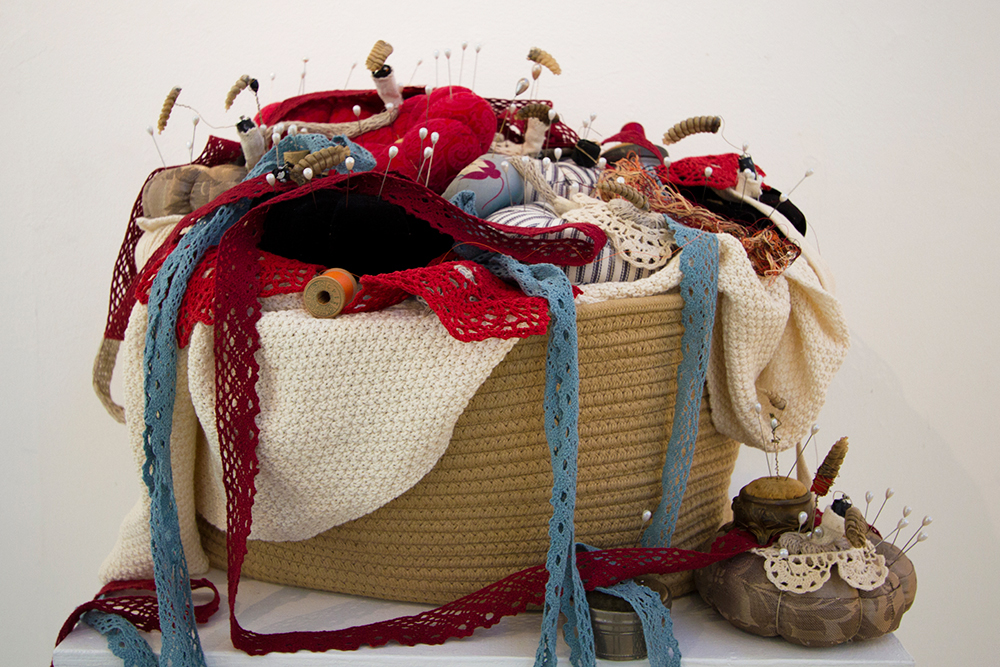
Now Is Not a Good Time, by Margaret Noble

Reviewing her exhibit titled, "Now Is Not A Good Time", Rebecca Romani of The Buzz wrote in 2018 of its "intriguing mix" of sewing and tatting materials and rattlesnake tails powered by tiny batteries. Romani commented, "It's tempting to read a cautionary tale of watching too much Little House On The Prairie and the nostalgia that lead us to these current times."

Reviewer Michael James Rocha said in 2016, "Artist Margaret Noble isn't afraid to push the boundaries of what's art."

Observing Frakture, Jennie Punter of Musicworks wrote of Noble's "underground club DJ’s flair for performance and a conceptual artist's commitment to the rigorous investigation of ideas". Mark Jenkins of The Washington Post wrote, "Her primary goal is audience participation, whether that involves turning a crank or inserting one's head into a box to prompt whooshing sounds. Noble's work completes its circuit when the spectator is, literally or figuratively, inside it."

Of the exhibit 44th and Landis, Angela Carone of Public Radio International commented, "Look close and you'll see the ghosts of Ms. Pac-Man, the labels from Animal Cracker boxes and Laffy Taffy, and, on the seedier side, signage from neighborhood massage parlors. The paper dolls are pint-sized mash-ups of '80s pop culture and Victoriana. They seem to emerge from Noble's childhood dreams as she tried to make sense of both a threatening and exciting environment." Drew Snyder noted, "...there is an excess to the sound collage, a soft but persistent drone of spinning bottles or coins, rolling glass marbles, the eternal creak of a cabinet hinge, the rapt knocking on a door, or the sound of something falling over. These reverberations are strikingly material, a confluence and collision of metal, plastic, wood and glass that mash up and reconfigure what we can imagine as a neighborhood's aural life."

== Discography ==
=== Albums ===
- Frakture (2010, self-released on CD and vinyl)

=== Compilations ===
- "Nufon", from Female Pressure (2008, Austrian DVD release)
- "Safer is Better", from Musicworks #118 Spring 2014 (2014, CD)

== Solo exhibitions ==
- 44th and Landis, Museum of Contemporary Art San Diego, 2012
- Touch, Ohrenhoch der Geräuschladen Sound Gallery, Berlin, Germany, 2014
- Dorian's Gray, Roswell Museum and Art Center, Roswell, NM, 2015
- Resonating Objects, Institute of Contemporary Art, San Jose, CA, 2015
- Interactivity: Sight and Sound, Cafritz Foundation Arts Center, Montgomery, MD, 2015
- Resonating Objects, Kenneth J. Minnaert Center for the Arts, South Puget Sound Community College, Olympia, WA, 2016
- Surrogate Daydreams, Mute Gallery, Lisbon, Portugal, 2016
- Incorporeal Things to Control, Athenaeum Music & Arts Library, San Diego, CA, 2016
- Surrogate Daydreams, LAAA Gallery 8 25, Los Angeles, CA, 2016
- Resonating Objects, Monterey Peninsula College Art Department Gallery, Monterey, CA, 2018
- Resonating Objects, Lewis-Clark State College Center for Arts & History, Lewiston, ID, 2018

== Honors and awards ==
- International Government's Grant, 2007
- Hayward Prize, 2007
- University of California Alumni "Change the World" Scholarship
- Microsoft Global Educator Award for Knowledge Building
- Creative Catalyst Fellowship, 2012
- First Prize, Musicworks composition contest, for "Safer is Better", 2013
- First Place, Athenaeum Juried Exhibition, for I Long to Be Free From Longing, 2014

== Selected sound art installations ==
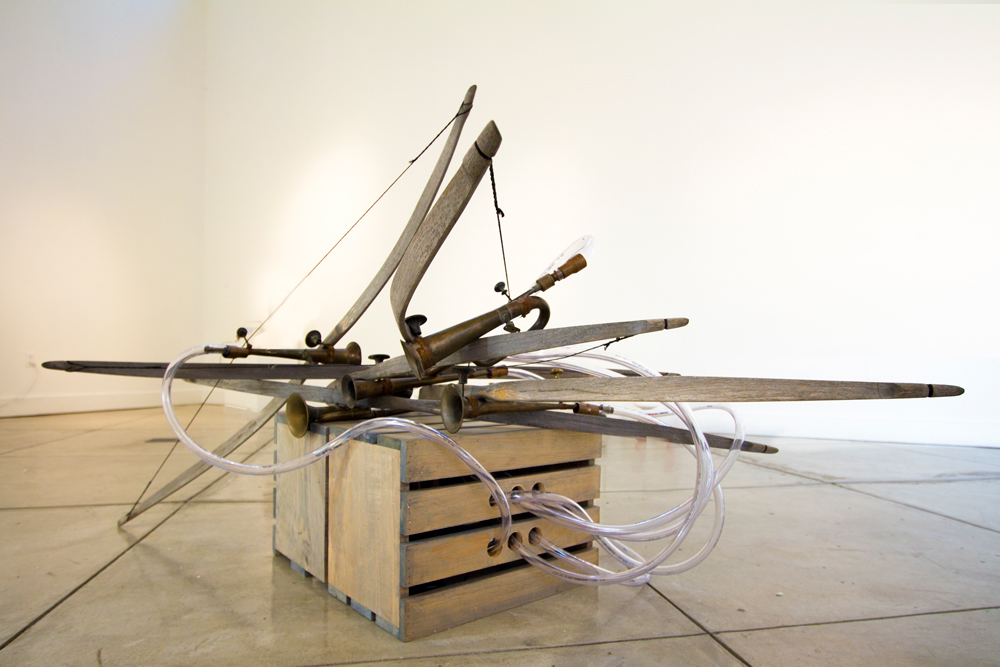
Clamor Machine
by Margaret Noble

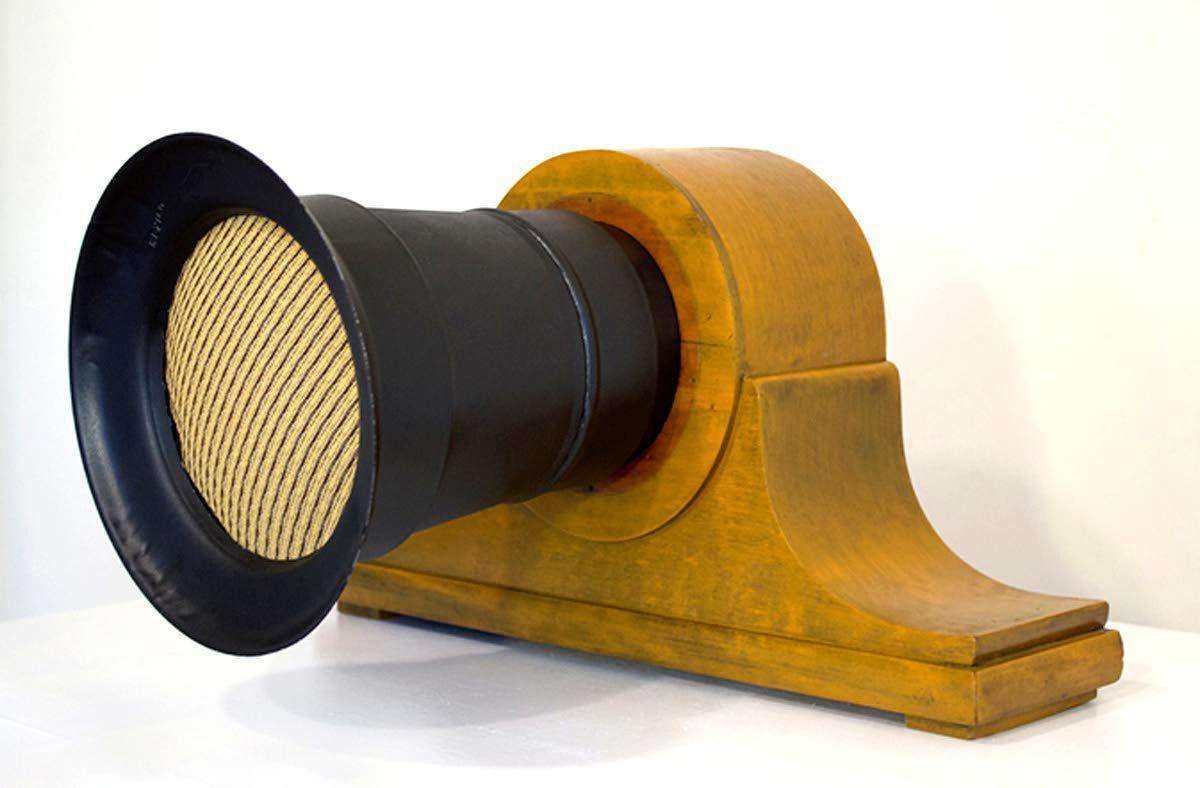
Home Made Time Machine
by Margaret Noble

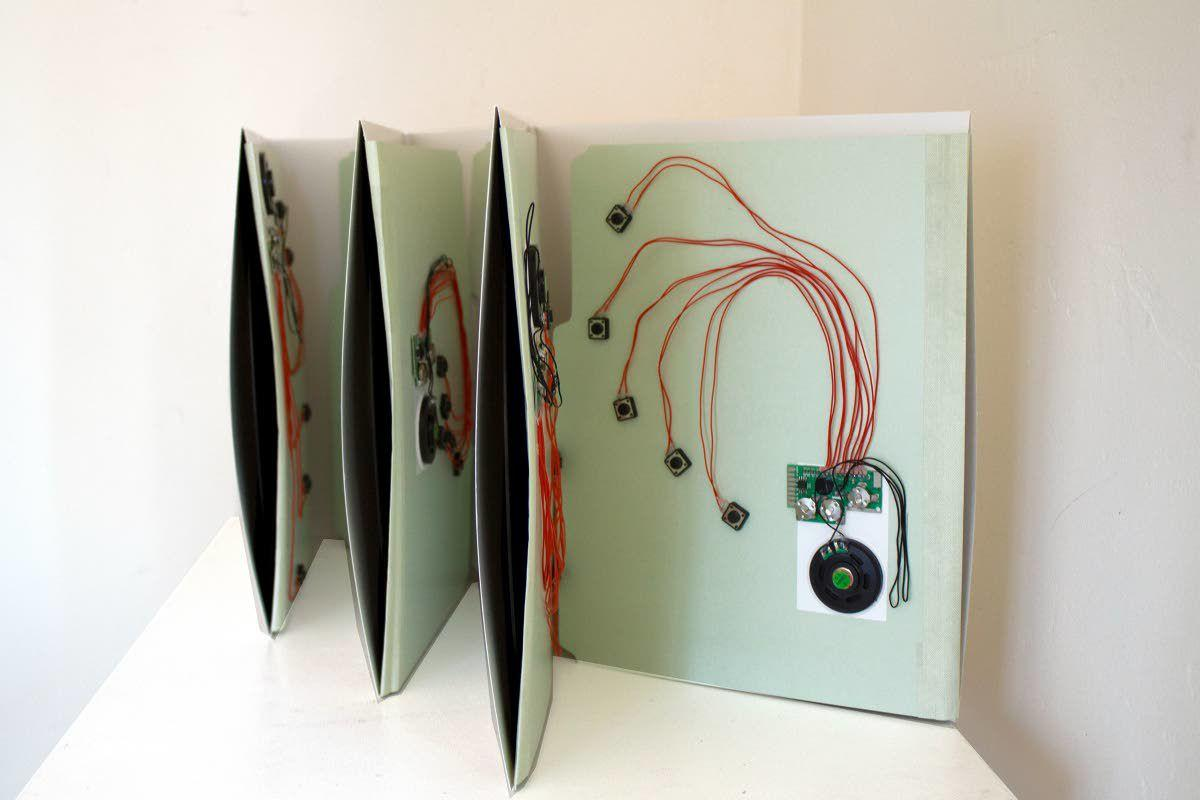
Reductionist Records
by Margaret Noble

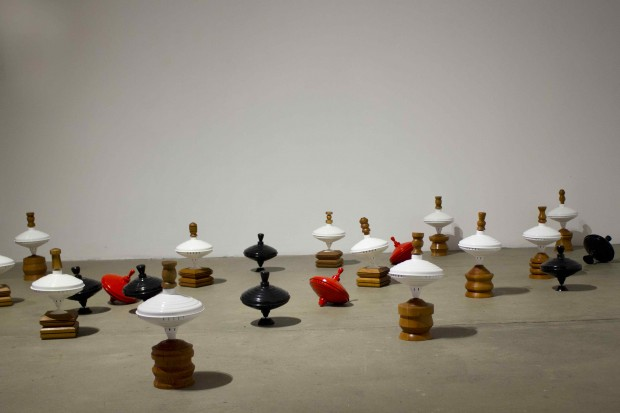
Scaled Discords
by Margaret Noble
