= India Foundation for the Arts =

Non-profit organization based in India

The India Foundation for the Arts (IFA) is an independent, non-profit organization that supports arts and cultural projects in India through funding and implementation. Established as a public trust in 1993, it is headquartered in Bangalore and has supported over 950 projects. Anmol Vellani, the founding director, previously worked with the Ford Foundation, a private American foundation.

In 2018, the IFA established the IFA Archive, a dedicated repository for preserving materials from its associated projects. The IFA Archive comprises digital materials from over 500 projects and physical collections from over 700 projects, accessible by appointment in Bangalore.

== Management ==
The Founder Director, Anmol Vellani, is a professional in arts management and organized philanthropy. He served as the Executive Director until 2013, succeeded by Arundhati Ghosh. In June 2023, Menaka Rodriguez assumed the role of Executive Director.

Constituted on a national basis, the Board of Trustees holds primary responsibility for the growth and sustenance of IFA. The Trustees help determine management policies and program goals and bring significant experience in diverse fields.

== Programmes ==
IFA has five programmes that variously respond to existing demand for support, provide opportunities for artists to explore untried processes and new connections in the arts, or address systemic issues in the field. The projects implemented under the programmes involve all forms of cultural expression, while accommodating work that falls outside specific domains of art, blurs disciplinary boundaries, or anticipates new modes of artistic production and presentation, emphasizing work in Indian languages other than English.

The Arts Research programme engages scholars, researchers, and practitioners to research various histories and expressions of artistic practices in India, fostering broader perspectives, understandings, interpretations, and engagements in the arts.

The Arts Practice programme seeks to implement projects that enable artists to expand their present range of practices in new directions, such as questioning accepted conventions, pushing new frontiers in content, form, and medium, exploring new modes of engagement with space, audience, and communities, and foregrounding a spirit of experimentation.

The Arts Education programme commenced in 1998-99 to foster lifelong learning in students through engagement with the arts. The program was reviewed in 2008-09, and the recommendations led to Kali-Kalisu ('learn and teach' in Kannada), an arts-based teacher training programme for government school teachers across the length and breadth of Karnataka. IFA continuously engages with the National Council of Educational Research and Training, the Directorate of Public Instruction, Karnataka, and the Department of State Education, Research and Training, Karnataka to intensify its capacity-building program.

The Archives and Museums programme has a twofold objective: to provide arts practitioners and researchers with an opportunity to generate new, critical, and creative approaches for public engagement with archives and museum collections and to energize these spaces as platforms for dialogue and discourse.

The Project 560 programme is inspired after the first three digits of Bangalore's pin code and encourages artists, scholars, institutions, neighbourhoods, and citizens to engage creatively and critically in the city of Bangalore.

== Board of Trustees ==
- Ajai Kumar Singh, Civil Service, Bangalore, is the Chairperson
- Alok Rai, Language and Literature, Allahabad
- Arti Kirloskar, Art and Industry, Pune
- G Arunima, History and Culture, New Delhi
- Lakshmi Subramanian, History and Culture, Goa
- Navtej S Johar, Dance, New Delhi
- Paula Sengupta, Art and Curation, Kolkata
- S Subramaniam, Finance, Bangalore
- Saajan Poovayya, Law, Bangalore
- Sobha Nambisan, Civil Service, Bangalore
- Vivek Shanbhag, Language and Literature, Bangalore
