= Donald Burgy =

American artist

Donald Thomas Burgy
- Born: 1937 (age 88–89)
- Known for: American Conceptual Artist, Professor Emeritus in the Studio for Interrelated Media at Massachusetts College of Art and Design, Boston
- Spouse: Joy Renjilian-Burgy
- Children: Sons: Lucien Heart (Formerly Lucien Boston Sky Renjilian Burgy and Sarkis Love (Formerly Sarkis Boston Sky Renjilian Burgy)
- Website: https://www.donaldburgy.com

Donald Burgy (born 1937) is an American conceptual artist, author, and teacher. He is a professor emeritus in the Studio for Interrelated Media at Massachusetts College of Art and Design in Boston. He earned a Bachelor of Fine Arts from the Massachusetts College of Art and Design (at that time known as the Massachusetts College of Art) in Boston in 1959 and a Master of Fine Arts from Rutgers University in 1963. Burgy began his teaching career in 1960, teaching art in public schools in Quincy, Massachusetts; Chicopee, Massachusetts; and Brentwood, New York. From 1966 to 1973, Burgy taught art history and art studio at the Bradford Junior College in Bradford, Massachusetts. He was the chair of the art department at Milton Academy in Milton, Massachusetts, from 1973 to 1975. Burgy taught studio art at Harvard University before his tenure at the Massachusetts College of Art in the Studio for Interrelated Media in Boston from 1971 until 2001. Burgy has studied neurology, cosmology, and Paleolithic art as the basis for his conceptual artwork since 1969.

== Background ==
Burgy has received grants from the Ford Foundation, Rockefeller National Endowment, National Endowment for the Arts, and Massachusetts Council on the Arts. His work has been exhibited in the Museum of Modern Art, New York; at the Städtisches Museum, Leverkusen, Germany; and at the Third Conference on Planetology and Space Mission Planning, New York Academy of Sciences, New York. His work includes a book entitled Art Ideas for the Year 4000, published by the Addison Gallery of American Art. Burgy is one of the founders of the conceptual art movement.

== Collections ==
- Museum of Modern Art, New York, New York
- Addison Gallery of American Art, Andover, Massachusetts
- Mount Holyoke College Art Museum, South Hadley, Massachusetts
- Boston Public Library Copley Square, Boston, Massachusetts
- Wellesley College Art Library, Wellesley, Massachusetts
