= Industry of the Ordinary =

Industry of the Ordinary (IOTO) is a two-person conceptual art collaborative, made up of Chicago-based artists and educators Adam Brooks and Mathew Wilson. Their work is usually performative or sculptural, often incorporating audience participation and interaction with the artists.

== About ==
Industry of the Ordinary document their projects at their website, where their manifesto states, "Through sculpture, text, photography, video, sound and performance, Industry of the Ordinary are dedicated to an exploration and celebration of the customary, the everyday, and the usual. Their emphasis is on challenging pejorative notions of the ordinary and, in doing so, moving beyond the quotidian." Industry of the Ordinary formed in 2003. IOTO's work appears in diverse forms, including performances tailored for specific exhibitions and performance art openings, artist-driven interventions on the streets of cities throughout the US and internationally, and public works commissioned by the Nebraska State Historical Society, the City of Chicago Department of Cultural Affairs and Special Events (DCASE) and the Billboard Art Project, among others. They have shown work at the Museum of Contemporary Art, Chicago, the Chicago Cultural Center, the Art Institute of Chicago, the Hyde Park Art Center, and the Museum of Contemporary Art, Los Angeles.

== Themes ==
Industry of the Ordinary's work deals with themes of faith, freedom, politics, youth culture, celebrity, competitive sports, sex and drinking. They often employ collaborative strategies, as in their piece 39 Verbs, for which they commissioned fellow arts professionals to create 39 works inspired by arbitrarily assigned verbs taken from their previous works' titles. This emphasis on collaboration subverts traditional conceptions of art creation as highly individualistic, calling into question the elitism of the institutional art world. Works like Celebrity and the Peculiar, an installation of oxygen tents suffused by humidifiers with various celebrity perfumes, question popular culture's obsession with notoriety and our individual attempts to identify with celebrities. IOTO's preoccupation with public interaction and stated intention that their work be completed by the creative interpretation and engagement of the audience has led some critics to categorize their work within the umbrella of Relational Aesthetics. Their work has also been linked to the Situationist International and Fluxus movements. Their public interventions, usually ephemeral and existing afterwards only in the form of documentary photographs, videos, or text, has also been compared to the Happenings of the 1960s. One piece, Re-Work (for Allan Kaprow, Marina Abramović and Philip-Lorca diCorcia), re-imagines Allan Kaprow's delegated performance, Work. In his original, Kaprow hired professional house painters to paint and re-paint the hallway of a gallery space. For their Re-Work at the Museum of Contemporary Art, Los Angeles, IOTO hired two sex workers to perform the same task while wearing their "professional" attire. Just as Kaprow's piece questioned the distinction of artist by contracting out the actual art-making process, IOTO's piece questions our assumptions about the nature of, and our subsequent judgements of, certain types of labor.

== Sic Transit Gloria Mundi ==
Industry of the Ordinary's mid-career retrospective, Sic Transit Gloria Mundi, was shown at the Chicago Cultural Center from August 2012 to February 2013. It was an exhibition of many of their works to that point, as well as several new pieces and a series of commissioned performances and installations which occurred throughout the run of the show. One of the elements of the show, the Portrait Project, consisted of 71 portraits of Industry of the Ordinary, commissioned from 71 different artists in various media. Another piece, Everyone, was a projected, scrolling, crowd-sourced list attempting to name every professional artist in Chicago. The show was well received, being accorded one of the spots on Newcity's Top Five Chicago Art Exhibitions of 2012.

== Selected exhibitions and performances ==
=== 2014 ===
Venetiaanse Gaanderijen, Ostend Pavilion, Ostend, Belgium (project identity and principal image)
RISK: Empathy, Art and Social Practice, Glass Curtain Gallery, Chicago, Illinois
Tragedy, Missoula and Bozeman, Montana (solo performances)

=== 2013 ===
Guns and Butter, UIS Gallery, Springfield, Illinois (solo show)

=== 2012 ===
Industry of the Ordinary: Sic Transit Gloria Mundi, mid-career survey, Chicago Cultural Center, Chicago, Illinois
Memory Over Forgetting, Exposition Chicago opening night performance, Chicago, Illinois
Foreign Affairs, Rapid Pulse International Performance Festival, Defibrillator Gallery, Chicago, Illinois (solo performance)
Sight and Sound, Billboard Art Project, Richmond, Virginia
Starving Artist, Chicago Artists' Coalition, Chicago, Illinois
Evil is Interesting, Antena, Chicago, Illinois
Arts and Crafts, Public House, Chicago, Illinois

=== 2011 ===
Industry of the Ordinary, Watkins College of Art, Nashville, Tennessee (solo show)
Wicker Park/Bucktown Mural Project, Chicago, Illinois (long-term installation)
Whiskey and Kisses/Go-Betweens, MDW Fair, Chicago, Illinois
Visual Phrasing, College of St. Elizabeth, Morristown, New Jersey
Mash Flob, performance series at Museum of Contemporary Art, Chicago, Illinois
The Search, Andrew Rafacz Gallery, Chicago, Illinois
Hang In There, Co-Prosperity Sphere, Chicago, Illinois
Work With Me, A+D Gallery, Chicago, Illinois
Out of Site, public performance series organized by Defibrillator Gallery, Chicago, Illinois

=== 2010 ===
History as Idea, Nebraska State Historical Society, 1% for Art Commission, Lincoln, Nebraska (permanent installation)
Don’t Piss on Me and Tell Me It’s Raining, apexart, New York, New York
ORD[i]NANCE, Urban Environment Office, London, England
ACRE: Country in the City, Heaven Gallery, Chicago

=== 2009 ===
Super Market, Northeastern Illinois University Gallery, Chicago (solo show)

=== 2008 ===
12x12, Museum of Contemporary Art, Chicago (solo show)
Allan Kaprow–Art as Life, Museum of Contemporary Art, Los Angeles
Journeys, Chicago Public Library Public Art Commission, Chicago, Illinois (permanent installation)
Celebrity and The Peculiar, Gahlberg Gallery, College of DuPage, Illinois (solo show)
