= Physical art =

Physical art, as contrasted with conceptual art, refers to art that entirely exists in physical reality, in space and time. Its ontological status is that it is a physical object. The art is concretely realized but may be abstract in nature. For example, a painting, sculpture, or performance exists in the physical world. This is contrasted to conceptual art, some but not all kinds of performance art, computer software, or objects of mathematical beauty, such as a mathematical proof, which do not exist in the mental world or in physical world, but have other ontological status, such as in Plato's world of ideals. Here, the art may be realized in the physical world, such as a mathematical proof written on a chalkboard, but refer to objects that exists in the mind as concepts, not physical objects. A music performance is physical, while the composition, like computer software, is not.
