= Noemí Escandell =

Argentine artist (1942–2019)

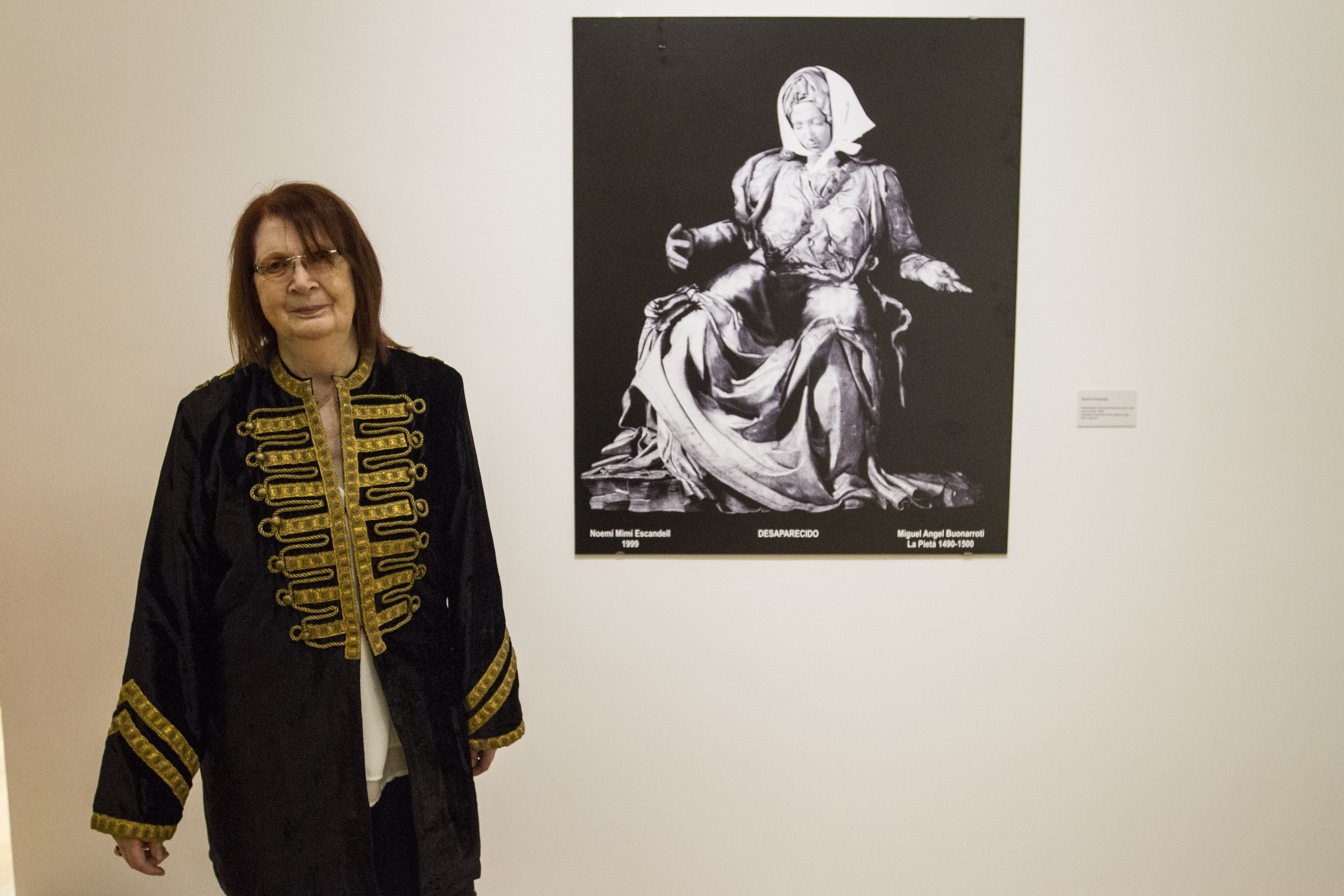
- Noemí Escandell receiving the National Artistic Career Award from Argentina's Ministry of Culture in November 2018.
- Born: 1942; Cañada de Gómez, Argentina
- Died: 2019 (aged 76–77); Rosario, Argentina
- Occupation: Artist

Noemí Escandell (1942–2019) was an Argentine postwar contemporary artist. Her abstract, geometric works on paper and wood were censored from 1968 through 1983. During the Juan Carlos Ongania dictatorship, she joined Rosario's Grupo de Arte Vanguardia, which organized the Tucumán arde protest.

Her work has been featured in several exhibitions in galleries and museums, including the Jewish Museum of New York and Henrique Faria, Buenos Aires.
