= Noah Lyon =

American artist

Noah Lyon (born September 11, 1979) is a multidisciplinary artist based in New York City.

A graduate of the Cooper Union for the Advancement of Science and Art, Noah Lyon works in drawing, painting, artist's books, sound art, and installation. He is the founder of Retard Riot, a network of radical individuals devoted to art, music, and philosophy. Under several different monikers (most commonly Doctor Ninja) he practices the art of cultural criticism, turntablism and plunderphonics. Beside his fine art career he maintains a prolific output of underground ephemera including Retard Riot zines, radio broadcasts, CD-R's, cassettes, stickers, flyers, collaborative tape music and buttons. His work is in the permanent collections of the Tate Britain and the Museum of Modern Art, The Menil Collection and The Whitney Museum of American Art.

== Paintings and drawings ==
Lyon as an artist has been compared to Pablo Picasso not because of his aesthetics but rather the brut instinct, intimacy and intuitive playfulness that his work reflects. The content of his drawings and paintings are more akin to the work of Hieronymus Bosch according to European art critic Thomas Millroth, “With a fantastic imagination à la Bosch Lyon gets his nourishment from popular culture, news flow, contemporary society, international politics and doomsday prophecies.” His work has been noted for its bold pop art imagery, surrealism and social criticism. Lyon often collides brightly colored minimalism with image saturated sensory overload aesthetics. His artwork was featured regularly in Fort Thunder’s Paper Rodeo.

== Noah Lyon buttons ==
Noah Lyon has created and continues to develop a series of one inch pin-back buttons, creating thousands of hand drawn designs and original texts. The buttons contain a mix of political satire, absurdist propaganda, social critique and simple observations. They are sold en masse by the Los Angeles County Museum of Art, Massachusetts Museum of Contemporary Art, New Museum of Contemporary Art and the Whitney Museum of American Art.

== Exhibition history ==
Noah Lyon has exhibited extensively throughout Europe and the United States in galleries and museums including MoMA PS1, MOCA LA, Art Basel, The Armory Show, Printed Matter Inc., Anthology Film Archives, Deitch Projects, Brändström & Stene, Galleri Thomas Wallner and others. His work has been included in museum exhibitions with Andy Warhol, Robert Rauschenberg, Kenneth Anger and other influential American artists.
