= Street Song =

Street Song(s) may refer to:

== Music ==
- Street Songs, a 1981 album by Rick James
- Street Songs, an album by the King's Singers with Evelyn Glennie, 1998
- Street Song, two 1988 compositions for brass by Michael Tilson Thomas
- "Street Song", a song by the Who from Who, 2019

== Other uses ==
- The Street Song, a 1931 German film
- Street Song (film), a 1935 British film
- Street Songs, a 1942 poetry collection by Edith Sitwell

== See also ==
- Song of the Streets, another title for 1933 French film On the Streets
- Street Music (disambiguation)
- Street singer (disambiguation)
