= Agnès Thurnauer =

French-Swiss contemporary artist

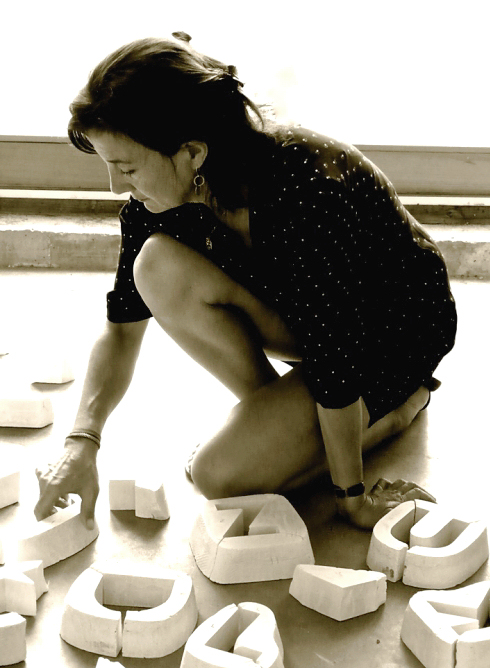
- Born: 1962 (age 63–64); Paris, France
- Education: École nationale supérieure des arts décoratifs
- Known for: Painting, collage, sculpture, installation art
- Notable work: Portraits grandeur nature, Matrice/sol, Grande prédelle, Big-Big et Bang-Bang, Olympia
- Website: agnesthurnauer.net

Agnès Thurnauer (born 1962) is a French-Swiss contemporary artist. Primarily a painter, she also works with a number of other media and techniques.

== Biography ==
Agnès Thurnauer was born in 1962, in Paris, France, where she continues to live and work. She attended the École Nationale Supérieure des Arts Décoratifs, where she studied cinema and video art.

== Notable work ==
=== Big-Big et Bang-Bang (1995–1996) ===
Big-Big et Bang-Bang are a series of abstract acrylic paintings in subtle colour tones on canvas created by Thurnauer between 1995 and 1996. The works were created with the canvases stapled to the wall. The paintings were only mounted on frames when complete, for the purposes of display and preservation. In a 2024 article titled "Big-big et Bang-bang: Agnès Thurnauer" published in Art Critique, the artist’s early series is described as a “pictorial rupture” which the artist herself considers a "pre-language period" in her practice.”

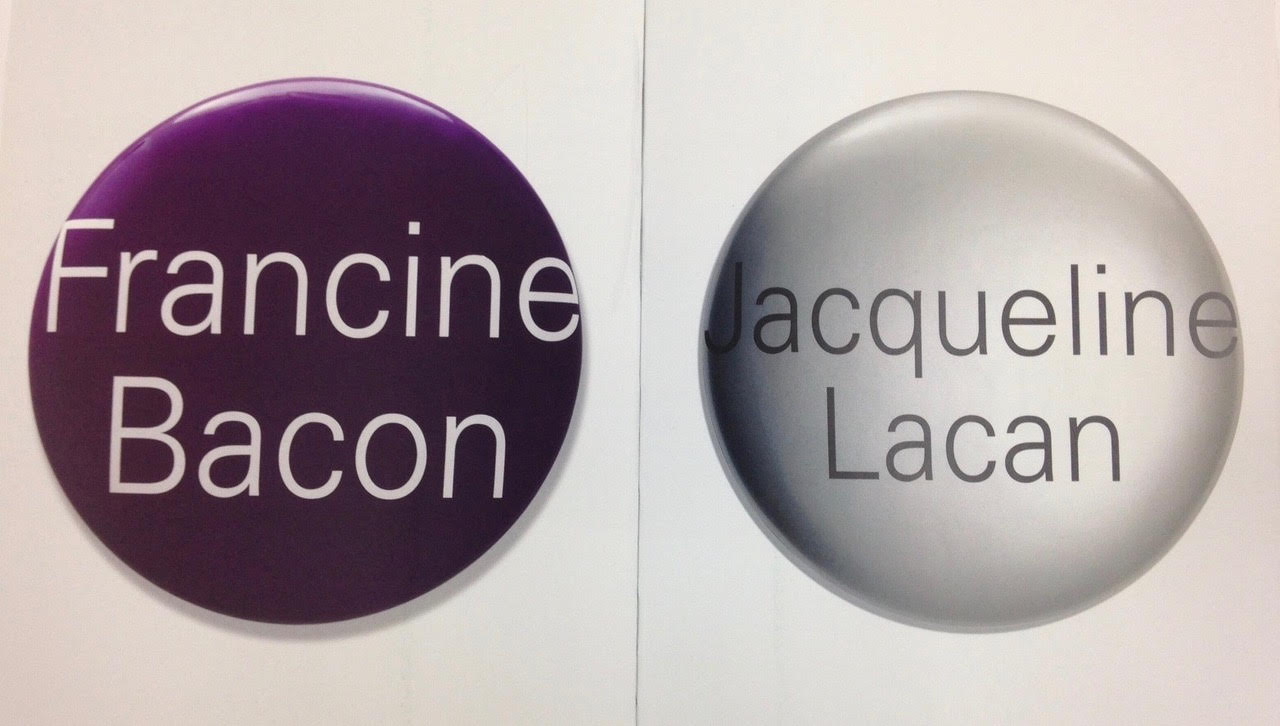
Portraits grandeur nature

=== Portraits grandeur nature (2007–2009) ===
In 2007, Thurnauer first exhibited her work Portraits grandeur nature, a series of oversized buttons (each 120 cm in diameter) in resin and epoxy paint displaying the names of well-known artists, mostly male, transformed into names evoking the opposite gender. For example, Marcel Duchamp becomes Marcelle Duchamp and Andy Warhol becomes Annie Warhol. An exception is the button reading Louis Bourgeois, a masculinized version of the name of the artist Louise Bourgeois. This work, which questions both the literal and figurative representation of women in art, propelled her to previously unattained notoriety as an artist.

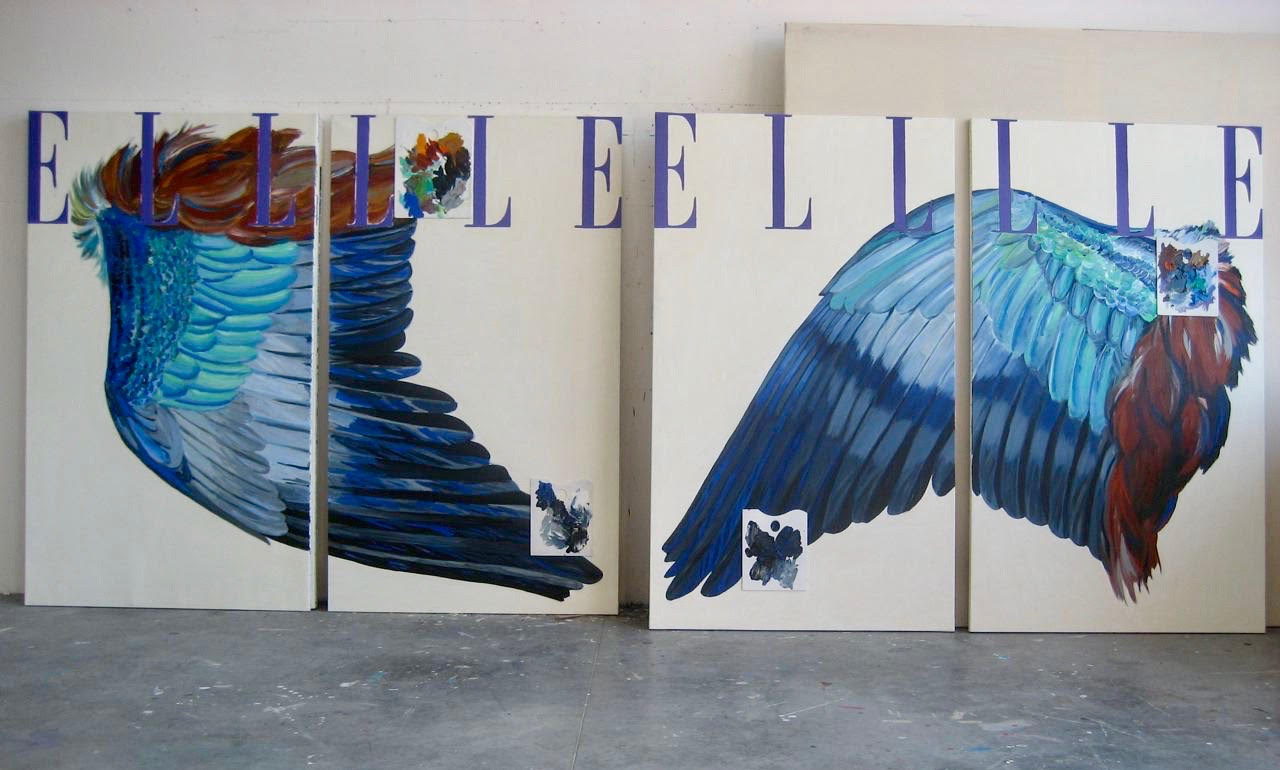
Grande Prédelle Rainbow Elbow (2008)

=== Prédelles (2007–2011) ===
Beginning in 2007, Thurnauer produced a series of works, called Prédelle (the French term for predella). The Grande Prédelle incarnations, produced from 2008 to 2011, are diptychs, each depicting a large feathered wing along a deformation of the iconic title of the magazine Elle. The title and subject convey a multiple play on words, simultaneously acting as a homonym for "près d'elle" and "aile", respectively meaning "close to her" and "wing" in French. Cyclicly, each Grande Prédelle painting has its own palette glued to it as a finishing touch.

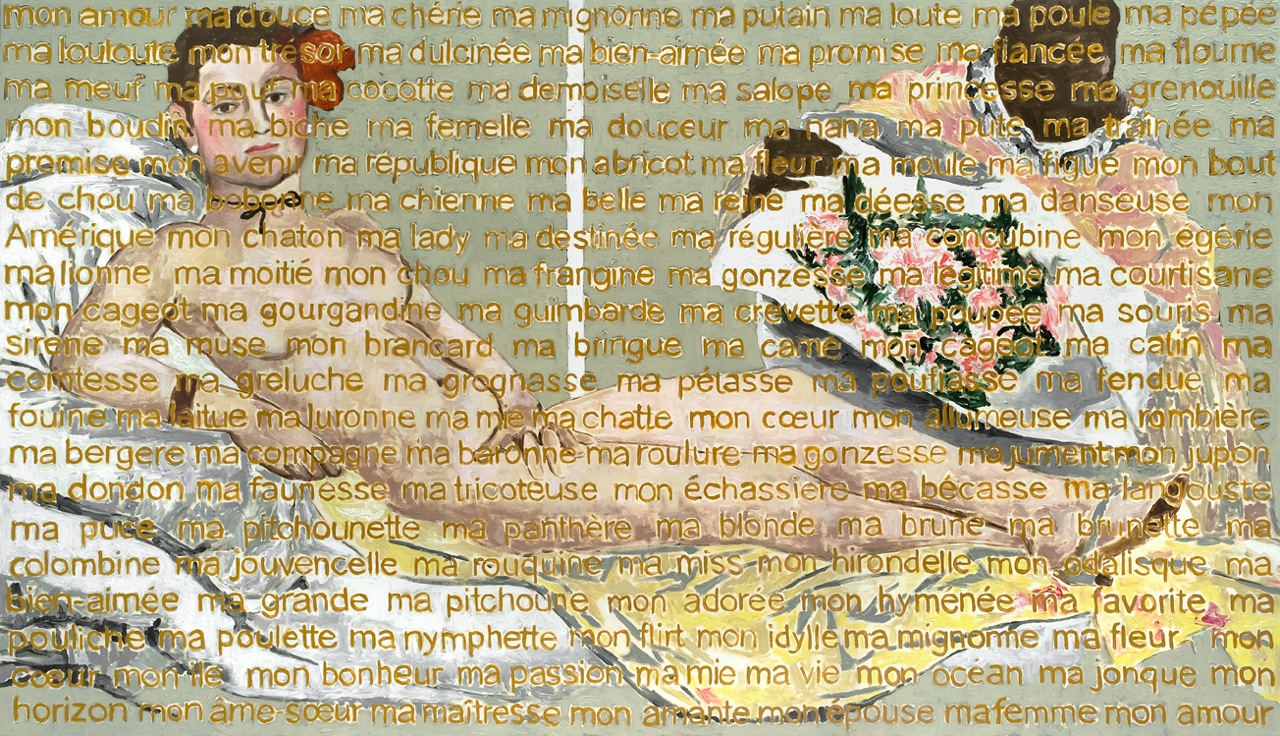
Olympia #2 (2012)

=== Olympia #2 (2012) ===
In 2013, Thurnauer was invited by Yale University to participate in an exhibition celebrating the 150th anniversary of two masterpieces by Édouard Manet (Olympia and Le Déjeuner sur l'herbe, 1863). Thurnauer contributed the painting Olympia#2, which features a rendition of Manet's Olympia with textual terms of endearment superimposed upon the image. Thurnauer was also a speaker at the associated conference.

=== You (2012–2013) ===
During a period of two months in 2015, Jesus College at the University of Cambridge replaced three portraits of male alumni in the formal dining hall with a crayon drawing triptych by Thurnauer, called You. These large portraits of women are extractions from paintings by Manet: A Bar at the Folies-Bergère, The Railway (of painter Victorine Louise Meurent), and another portrait of Meurent. Central to Thurnauer's choice of Manet's work as a starting point is the notion that his female subjects were themselves painters, as opposed to models. Inevitably, the subjects' regards captured in the paintings are therefore those of Manet's professional peers looking upon him as he worked. This marked the first time that Thurnauer's work was shown in the United Kingdom.

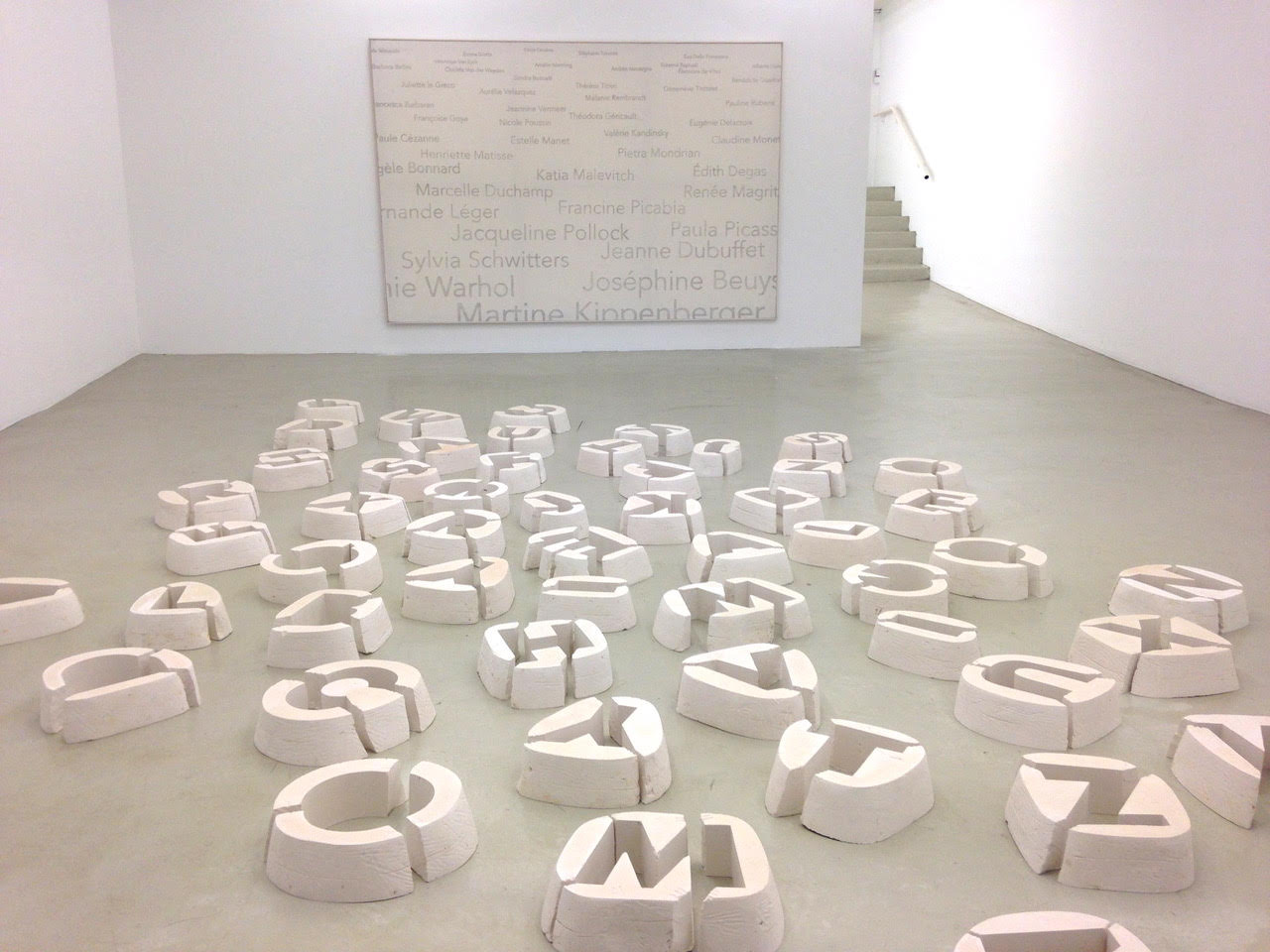
Matrice/sol (2012)

=== Matrice/sol (2012) ===
The work Matrice/sol consists of moulds of letters of the alphabet made from resin. Through the characters created from the negative space of the moulds, the work is intended to demonstrate that art is a question of interpretation and language, elements that change constantly.

== Painting as a medium ==
Thurnauer continues to challenge the relevance of the medium of painting today, which remains her staple despite ventures into other methods. For Thurnauer, a painting is not simply a passive surface displaying an image. Rather, it is a means to an active experience for the viewer. She has stated that she is interested in working with paint, an ordinary, inanimate object, as a means of confronting one's intemporality.

== Relationship with language ==
Thurnauer has long been fascinated with language, as evidenced by the recurring theme of wordplay, text and symbols in her work. She has been considered as a distant successor to the Art & Language movement.

Thurnauer considers the medium of painting to be a "place of speech". Her interpretation of this idea transcends the physical appearance of text in paintings, implying the materialization of thought itself. In her sculpture, Matrice/Sol, she employs letters moulded from resin, not merely as literal tools, but as spatial delimiters whose interstices form an expanse within which one can circulate.

== Solo exhibitions (selected) ==
- 2001 Pour en venir au monde, Le Crédac, Ivry-sur-Seine, France
- 2003 Les circonstances ne sont pas atténuantes, Palais de Tokyo, Paris
- 2003 Maintenant avant après, Galerie Ghislaine Hussenot, Paris
- 2004 Don't pretend you've never heard of it, Springhornhof, Neuekirchen, Germany
- 2005 I will survive, Wim Reiff Gallery, Maastricht, Netherlands
- 2006 Around a round, Galerie Ghislaine Hussenot, Paris
- 2007 Bien faite, mal faite, pas faite, S.M.A.K., Ghent, Belgium
- 2008 Portraits grandeur nature, Galerie Anne de Villepoix, Paris
- 2009 Thurnauer à Angers, Musée des beaux-arts d'Angers, Angers, France
- 2010 May I?, Villa Emerige, Paris
- 2011 Manifestement, Espace d'Art Contemporain André Malraux, Colmar, France
- 2011 Sujet, verbe et compléments, Immanence, Paris
- 2014 Figure libre, Le Radar, Centre d'art Contemporain, Bayeux, France
- 2014 Now When Then - de Tintoret à Tuymans, Musée des beaux-arts de Nantes, Nantes
- 2014 Sleepwalking, Galerie de Roussan, Paris
- 2015 You, Jesus College, Cambridge University, Cambridge, UK
- 2016 A History of Painting, Château de Montsoreau-Museum of contemporary art, Montsoreau, France
- 2022 Agnès Thurnauer. See you at yours, Musée Matisse Nice, Nice France

== Group exhibitions (selected) ==
- 2004 FIAC, Galerie Ghislaine Hussenot, Paris
- 2005 Biennale de Lyon, Lyon
- 2006 Notre histoire, Palais de Tokyo, Paris
- 2009 elles@centrepompidou, Centre Pompidou, Paris
- 2013 Drawing Now, Carrousel du Louvre, Paris
- 2013 Lunch with Olympia, Edgewood Gallery, Yale School of Art, USA
- 2013 Jardin de langage, Fondation Poppy et Pierre Salinger, Thor
- 2013 Elles: Mulheres artistas na coleção do Centro Pompidou, CCBB, Rio de Janeiro, Brazil
- 2014 "G I R L", Galerie Emmanuel Perrotin, Paris
- 2014 Drawing Now, Carreaux du temple, Paris
- 2014 A bitter sweet legacy, Galierie de Roussan, Paris
- 2014 Cet obscur objet du désir- Autour de l'Origine du monde, Musée Gustave Courbet, Ornans, France
