= Portrait of Victorine Meurent =

1862 painting by Édouard Manet

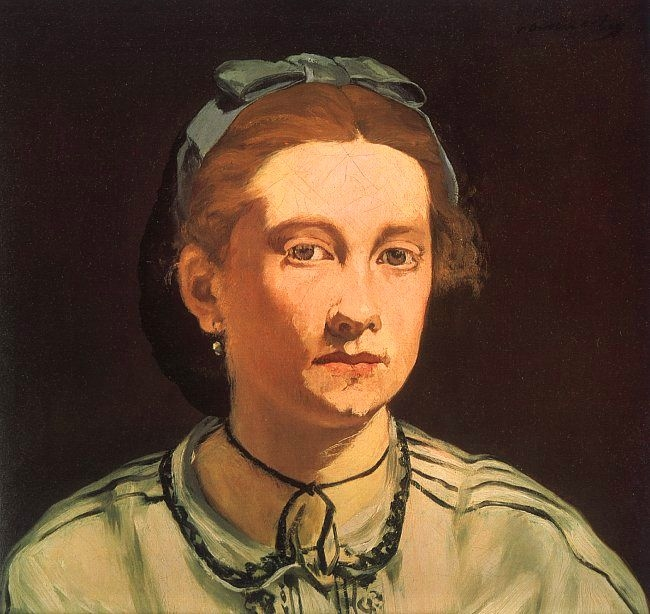
Portrait of Victorine Meurent (1862) by Édouard Manet

Portrait of Victorine Meurent is an 1862 oil on canvas painting by Édouard Manet, now in the Boston Museum of Fine Arts. It shows Victorine Meurent aged 18, also shown by Manet in his The Street Singer a few months later

The earliest photographs of the work by the Rosenberg Foundation show a signature, but the work cannot be found in the posthumous inventory or sale of Manet's works. It was recorded in Glasgow in the home of the shipping merchant and philanthropist William Burrell before returning to France in 1905 on its acquisition by the Galerie Bernheim-Jeune. It was later found in Alphonse Kahn's collection in Saint-Germain-en-Laye before being bought by Paul Rosenberg and then entering Robert Treat Paine's collection. Paine was a trustee of the Boston Museum of Fine Arts, to which the work was left by his son Richard C. Paine in 1946.

== See also ==
- List of paintings by Édouard Manet
- 1862 in art

== Bibliography ==
- Cachin, Françoise; Moffett, Charles S.; Bareau, Juliet Wilson (1983). Manet, 1832-1883 : Galeries nationales du Grand Palais, Paris, 22 avril-1er août 1983, Metropolitan Museum of Art, New York, 10 septembre-27 novembre 1983 (in French). [Paris]: Ministère de la Culture. ISBN 2-7118-0230-2. OCLC 9663346.
- Adolphe Tabarant, Manet et ses œuvres, Paris, Gallimard, 1947, 600 p.
- Adolphe Tabarant, Les Manet de la collection Havemeyer : La Renaissance de l'art français, Paris, 1930, XIII éd.
