= Thurnauer =

Thurnauer is a surname. Notable people with the surname include:

- Agnès Thurnauer (born 1962), French-Swiss contemporary artist
- Gérard Thurnauer (1926–2014), French architect
- Marion C. Thurnauer (born 1945), American chemist
