= Street Music =

Street Music may refer to:

== Film and television ==
- Street Music (1936 film), a German film
- Street Music (1981 film), an American film
- Street Music, a webseries by Kassem G

== Music ==
- Street Music (album), a 2006 album by Defari
- Street Music, a 2005 album by Redrama
- Street Music, Op. 65, a 1977 orchestral composition by William Russo
- "Street Music", a song by Dizzy Gillespie from the 1964 The Cool World film soundtrack
- Street performance, performing in public places for gratuities

== See also ==
- Música de Rua (lit. Street Music), a 1994 album by Daniela Mercury
  - "Música de Rua" (song), the title song
- Street singer (disambiguation)
- Street Song (disambiguation)
