= A Woman With No Clothes On =

2008 novel by V. R. Main

- First edition cover art
- Author: V. R. Main
- Language: English
- Genre: Historical fiction
- Published: London: Delancey, 2008
- Publication place: France
- Pages: 335
- ISBN: 9780953911974
- OCLC: 280369069

A Woman With No Clothes On (2008) is V. R. Main's debut novel. Set in 19th-century Paris, it is the story of 18-year-old Victorine Meurent, the painter Edouard Manet and their shared longing for the ultimate painting. The novel won the Trafalgar Squared Prize, and was shortlisted for The People's Book Prize. It was published by Delancey Press.

== Plot summary ==
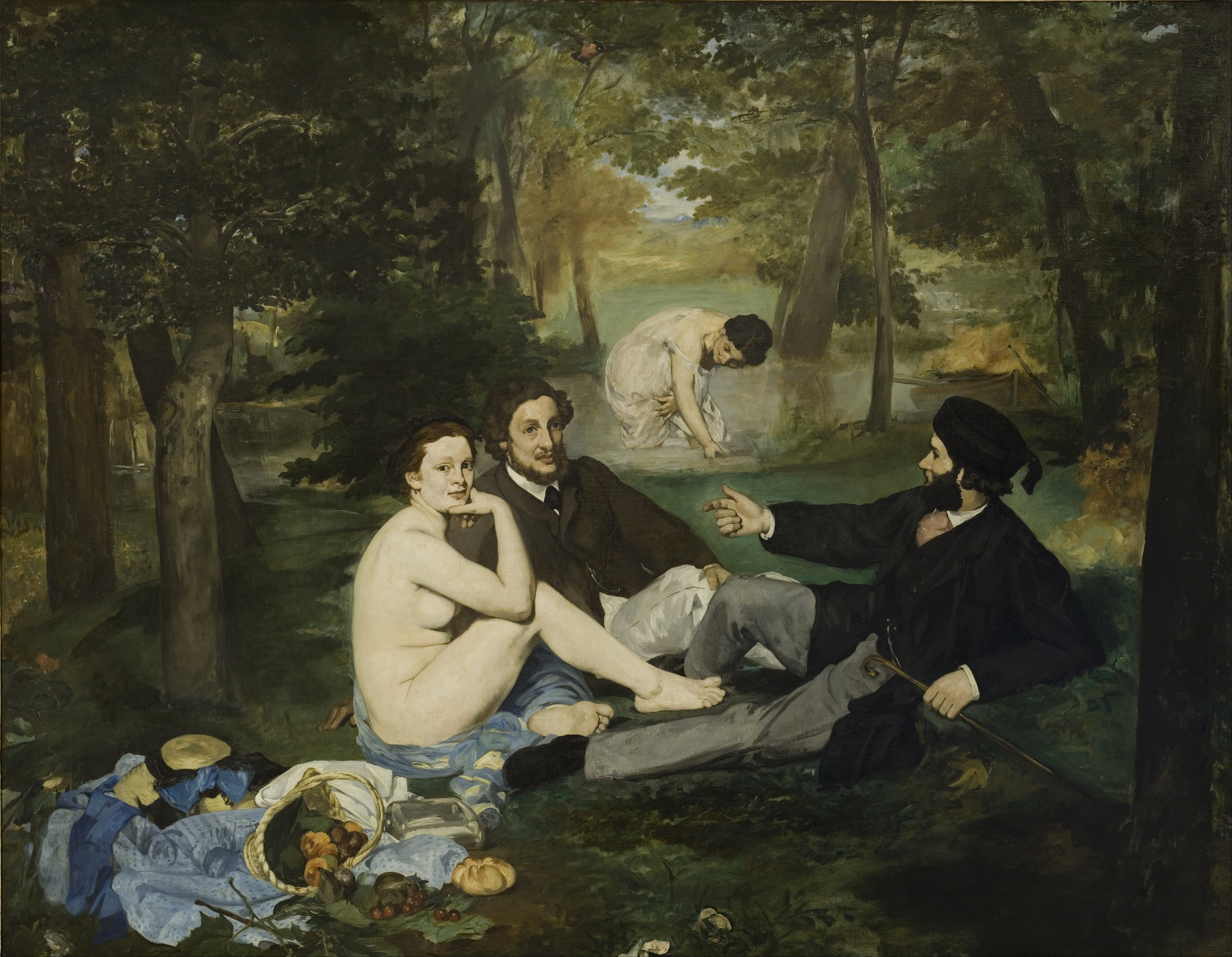
Le Déjeuner sur l'Herbe, Musée d'Orsay, 1862–1863 by Édouard Manet

The aristocratic Manet and the working-class Victorine Meurent narrate A Woman With No Clothes On. A chance meeting between the two leads to an intense relationship of painting and sexual tension. Manet creates a scandal when he exhibits Le déjeuner sur l'herbe and Olympia in which the naked model is a young Victorine. While critics and the general public dismiss the works, and label Victorine a common prostitute, she is determined to make her mark in the art world as a painter in her own right. Her bitter struggle to succeed is punctuated by the exchanges between Manet and his friend Baudelaire on the matter of modernism.

== Critical response ==
A Woman With No Clothes On was the winner of the Trafalgar Squared Prize for Work in Progress (2008). It was described by the chair of judges, Wendy Robertson as "outstanding. A powerful novel. The writing is original, literary, intense and well-observed".

The author of Manet, Lesley Stevenson praised Main for "rescu[ing] Victorine from her invisibility in the Parisian art world of the nineteenth century".

The novel received press attention in The Guardian and The Times. The Socialist Worker carried an article on the novel's attention to issues of gender and social class, as well as on the feminist blog The F-Word.
