= Victorine Meurent =

French painter & model (1844–1927)

Victorine-Louise Meurent
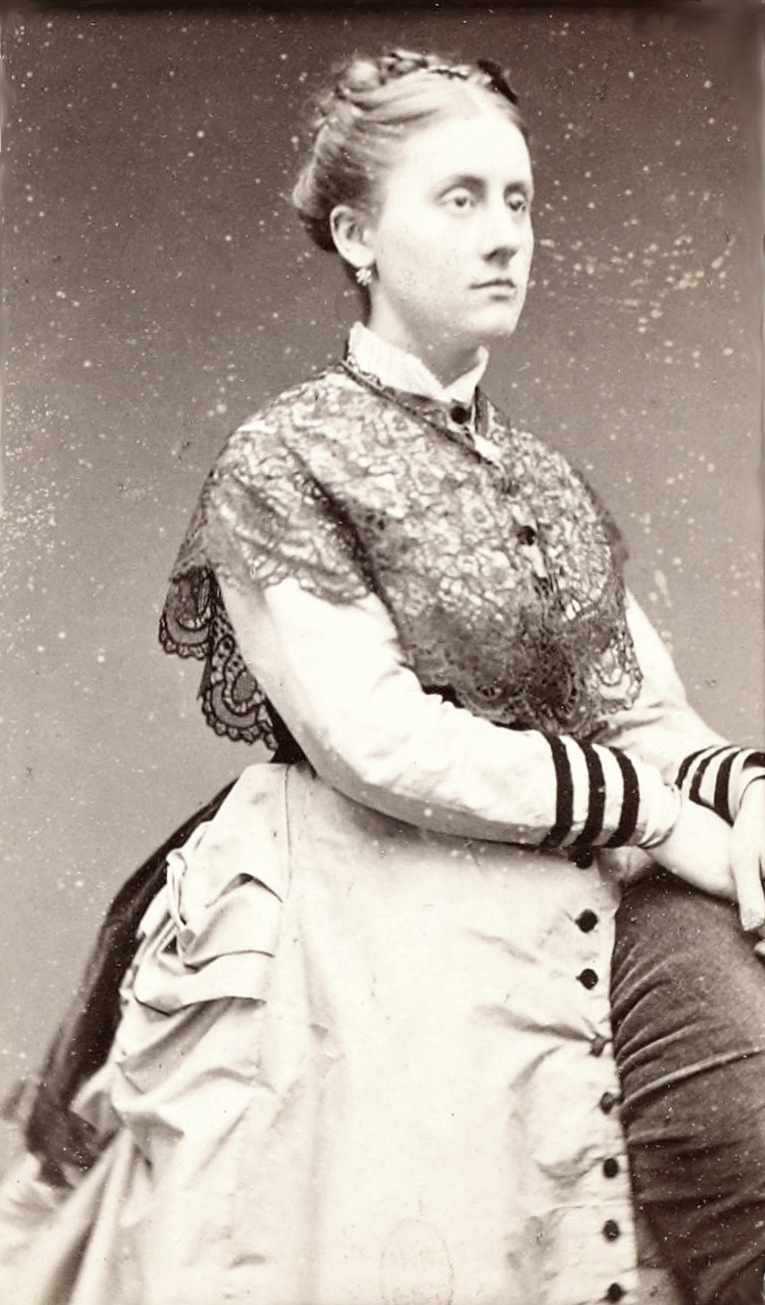
- Victorine-Louise Meurent, c. 1865 from an album of photographic portraits belonging to Édouard Manet
- Born: February 18, 1844; Paris
- Died: March 17, 1927 (aged 83); Colombes
- Education: Étienne Leroy (1828–1876)
- Known for: Painter, model

Victorine-Louise Meurent (also Meurant; February 18, 1844 – March 17, 1927) was a French painter and a model for painters. Although she is best known as the favorite model of Édouard Manet, she was an artist in her own right who regularly exhibited at the prestigious Paris Salon. In 1876, her paintings were selected for inclusion at the Salon's juried exhibition, when Manet's work was not.

== Biography ==
Victorine-Louise Meurent was born in Paris on Sunday, February 18, 1844, to a family of artisans. Her mother was a milliner and her father was a patinator of bronzes. In 1860, at the age of sixteen, Meurent began modeling in the studio of Thomas Couture and she may have studied art at his atelier for women.

Meurent first modeled for Manet in 1862, for his painting The Street Singer. She was particularly noticeable for her petite stature that earned her the nickname La Crevette (The Shrimp), and for her red hair, which is depicted as very bright in Manet's watercolor copy of Olympia. Meurent played the violin and the guitar. She gave lessons in the two instruments. She also sang, reportedly performing at café-concerts, a type of musical establishment associated with the Belle Époque in France, which initially were held outdoors.

Meurent's name remains forever associated with Manet's masterpieces of 1863, Le Déjeuner sur l'herbe (The Luncheon on the Grass) and Olympia, which feature nude portrayals of her. At that time, she also modeled for Edgar Degas and the Belgian painter Alfred Stevens, both of whom were close friends of Manet's. Her relationship with Stevens is said to have been particularly close.

Meurent was a professional cancan dancer, and traveled to New York from Paris in September 1868 as part of a troupe of forty-eight artistes to perform in Jacques Offenbach operettas, including Geneviève de Brabant at the French Theater on Fifth Avenue, in which she was considered “one of the most audacious can-can dancers of the troupe."

Manet continued to use Meurent as a model until the early 1870s, when she began taking art classes. Because she was drawn to the more academic style of painting that Manet opposed, Meurent and Manet became estranged. The last Manet painting in which Meurent appears is The Railway (1873). The painting is an example of Manet's use of contemporary subject matter.

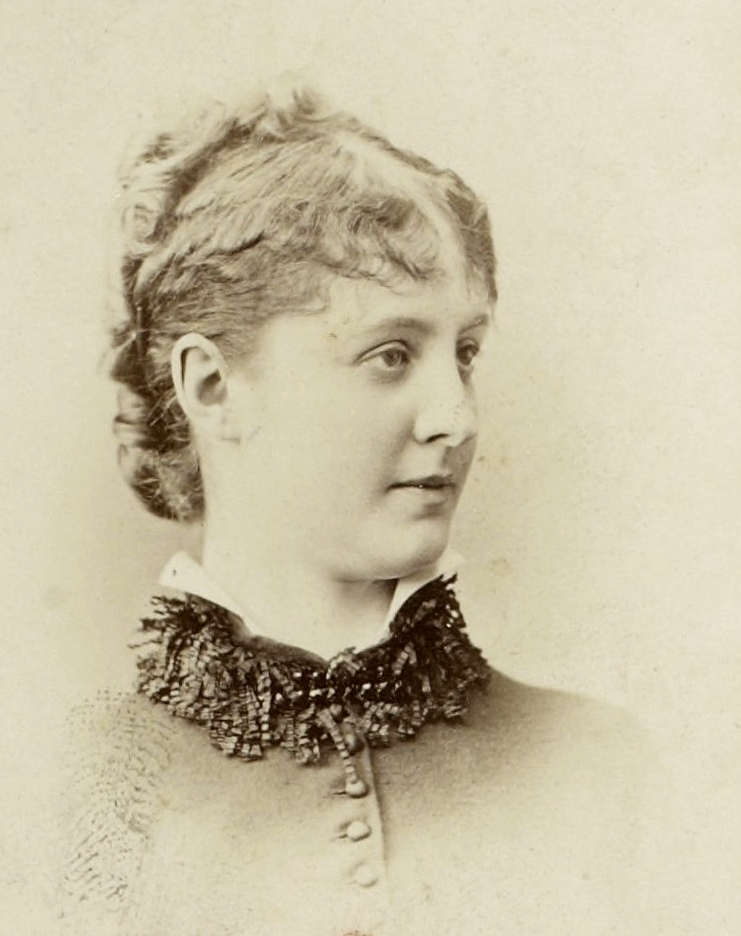
Photographic portrait of Victorine-Louise Meurent, c. 1862

In 1875, Meurent began studying with the portraitist Étienne Leroy. The following year, Meurent first submitted work of her own to the Salon and it was accepted. Manet's own submissions were rejected by the jury that year.

Meurent's entry at the Académie des Beaux-Arts in 1879, Bourgeoise de Nuremberg au XVIe siècle, was hung in the same room as the entry by Manet. Work by Meurent was included in the 1885 and 1904 exhibitions as well. In all, Meurent exhibited in the Salon four times. She also continued to support herself by modeling through the 1880s for Norbert Goeneutte, an artist best known for his etchings, and for Toulouse-Lautrec.

Meurent was inducted into the Société des Artistes Français in 1903, with the support of Charles Hermann-Leon and Tony Robert-Fleury, the founder of the Société. By 1906, at the age of 62, Meurent had left Paris for the suburb of Colombes, which is a commune to the northwest of Paris. It is located 10.6 km (6.6 mi) from the center of the city. She lived there for the remainder of her life in a house that she owned jointly with Marie Dufour. Meurent continued to refer to herself as an artist into her seventies, as recorded in a census from 1921.

At the age of 83, Meurent died on March 17, 1927. The contents of the house were liquidated after the death of Dufour in 1930. Reportedly, in the late twentieth century elderly neighbors from that commune in Colombes recalled the last contents of the house, including a violin and its case, being burnt on a bonfire.

== Paintings by Meurent ==
Most of the paintings by Meurent have been lost, but some are in the possession of museums:

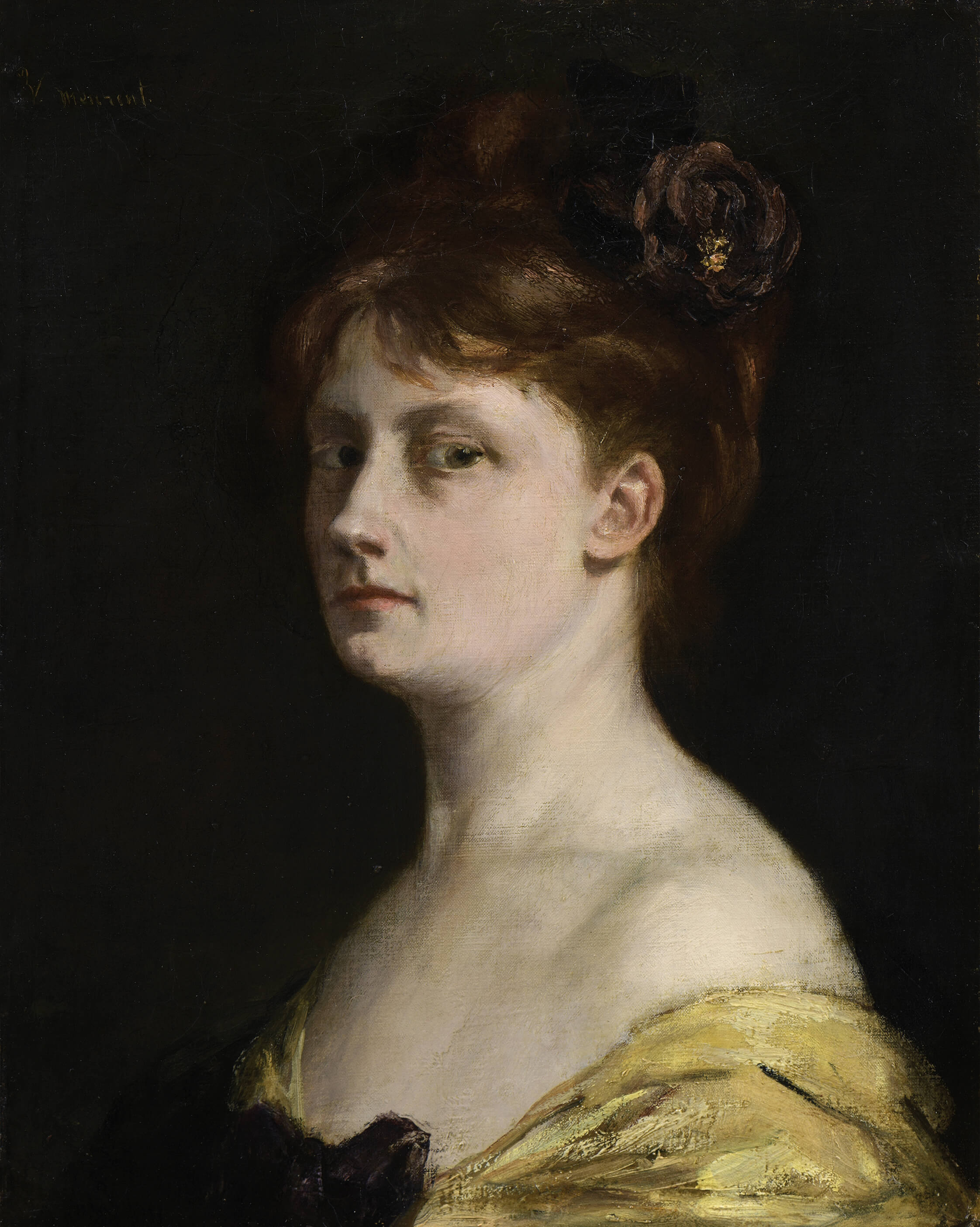
Self-portrait (1876), Boston Museum of Fine Arts

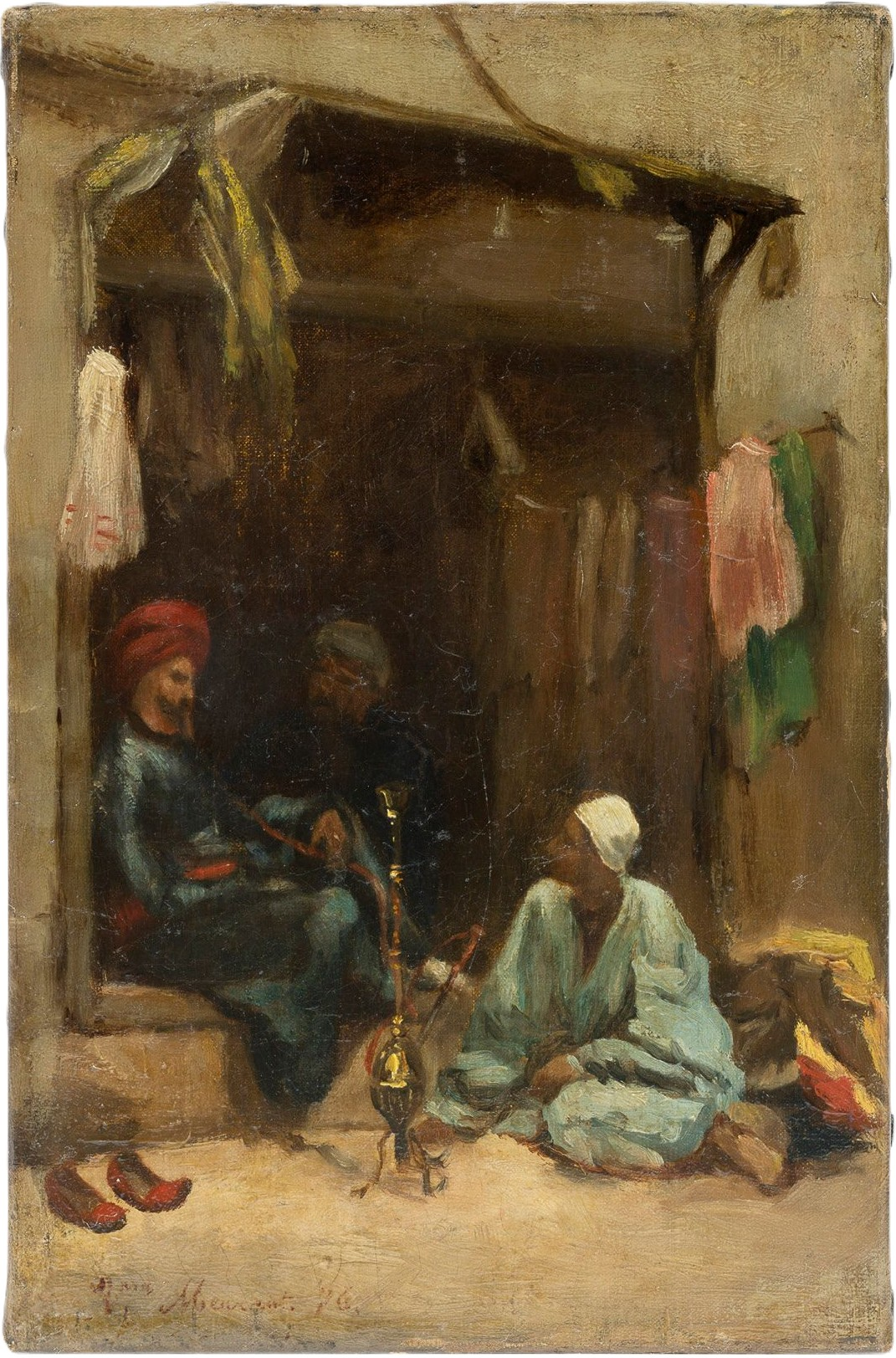
Orientalist scene with hookah smoker, 1876

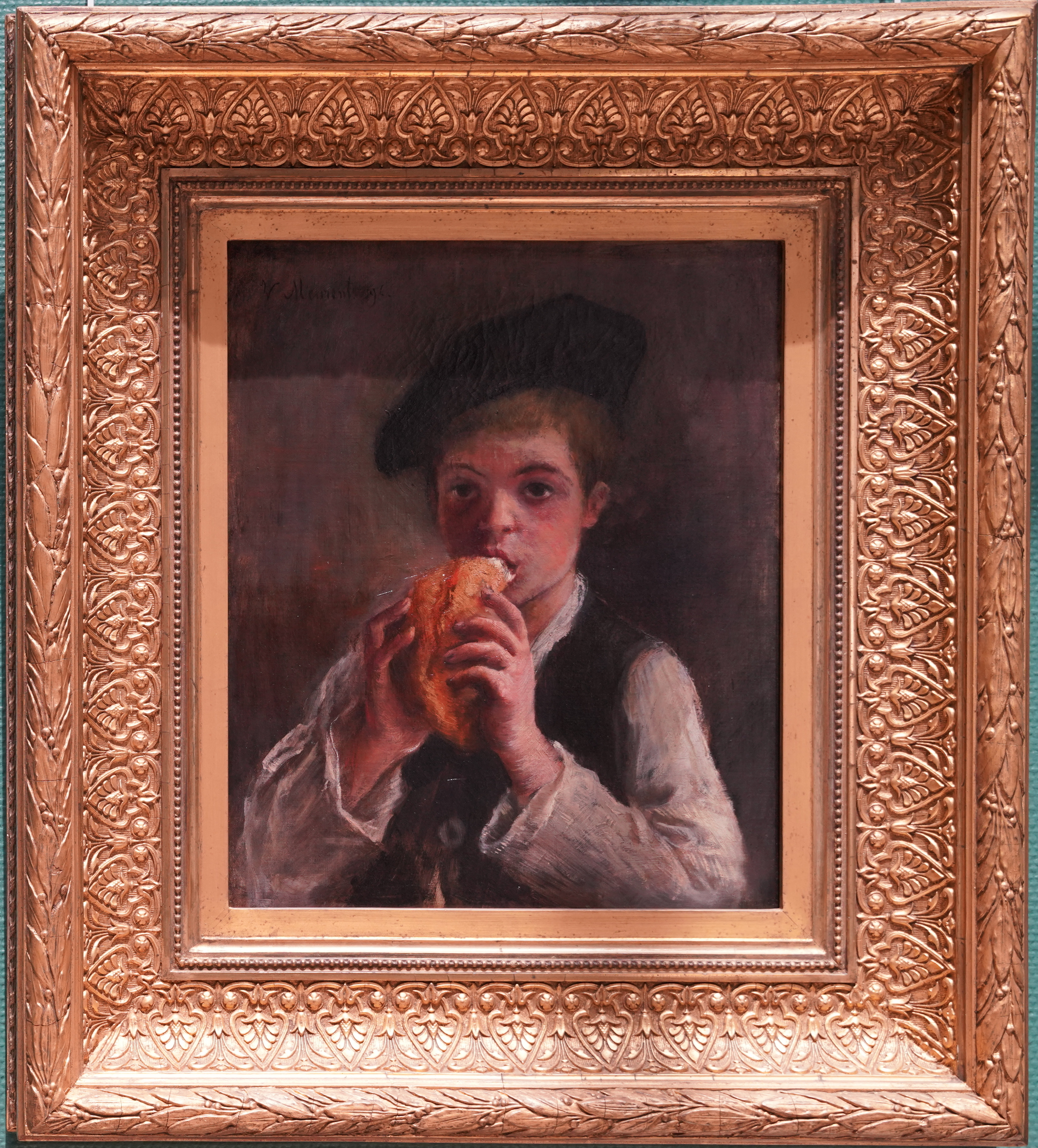
Le briquet, Musée Municipal d'Art et d'Histoire de Colombes

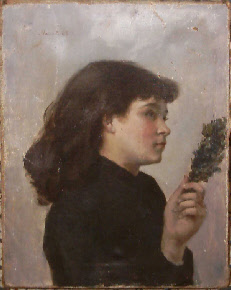
Le Jour Des Rameaux or
Palm Sunday, 1885, Musée Municipal d'Art et d'Histoire de Colombes

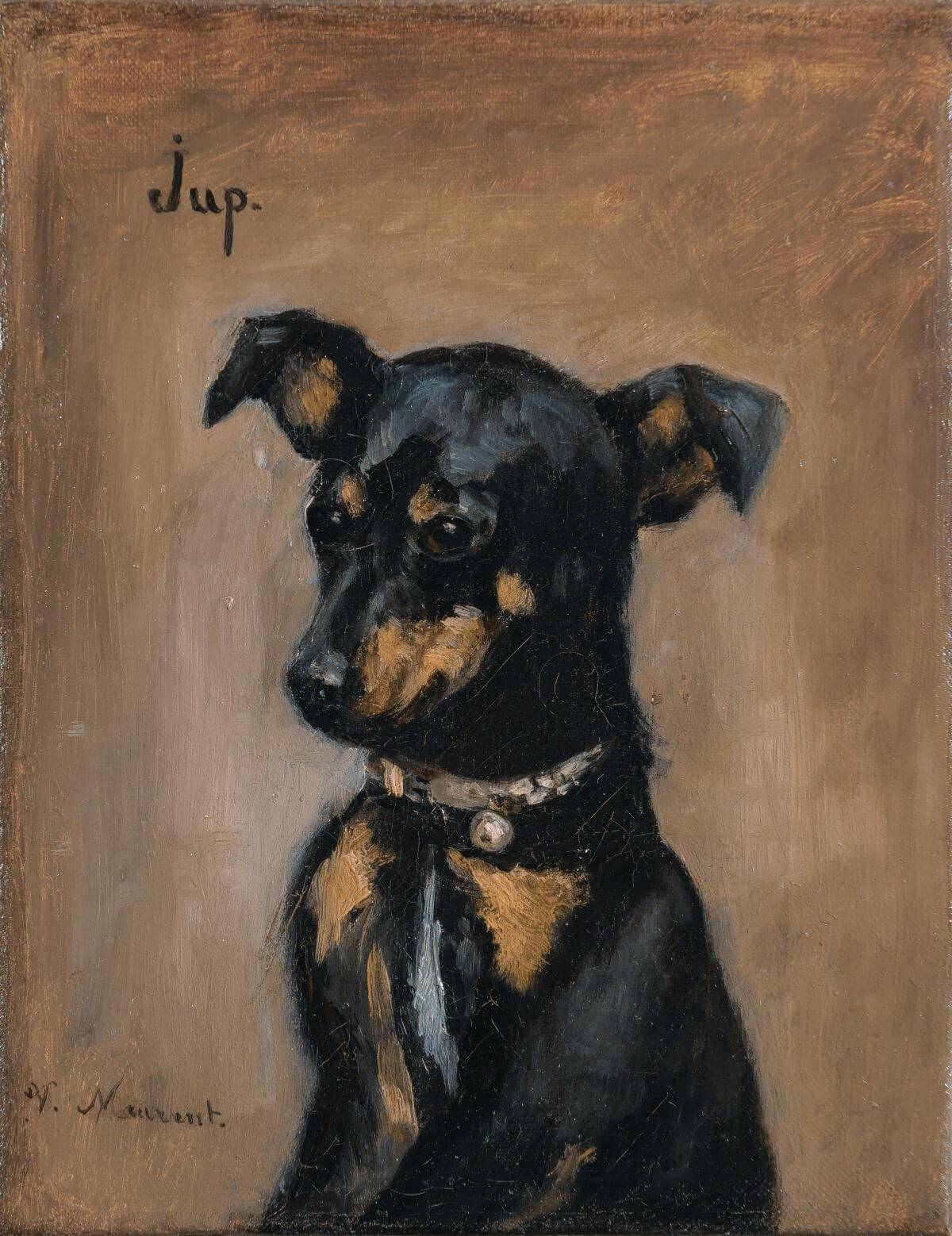
Jup, Musée Municipal d'Art et d'Histoire de Colombes

A painting by Meurent, Le Jour des Rameaux or Palm Sunday, was recovered in 2004 and is in the Colombes History Museum in France. A self-portrait she painted in 1876 was acquired by the Boston Museum of Fine Arts in the United States in September 2021, the first of her paintings in a museum collection outside France.

== In fiction ==
Meurent's life inspired two historical novels and she appears as a character in several others.

The Irish writer George Moore included Meurent as a character in his semi-fictional autobiography, Memoirs of My Dead Life (1906). Meurent appears in the book as a middle-aged woman, living in a lesbian relationship with a famous courtesan.

Meurent is the protagonist in two novels. She appears as such in both Mademoiselle Victorine: a Novel (2007) by Debra Finerman and A Woman With No Clothes On (2008) by V R Main.

She appears as a character in a novel by Christopher Moore that is titled Sacré Bleu (2012).

Another novel that features her is Paris Red by Maureen Gibbon (2015). It depicts Meurent and her relationship with Manet.

The novel Victorine (2020) by Drema Drudge is about Meurent and her journey to become a painter.

She is a recurring character in the Hugo Award nominated novelette “Colors of the Immortal Palette” by Caroline M. Yoachim.

She appears as a forlorn character in the novel by R.w. Meek entitled The Dream Collector, Book II “Sabrine & Vincent van Gogh” (2024).

The main character of Ruth Reichl's 2024 novel The Paris Novel embarks on a search for Meurent's lost paintings in 1980s Paris.

In film, Meurent is featured as a character in Intimate Lives: The Women of Manet. The film also is known as Manet in Love (1998). Her character is played by Shelley Phillips.

== In works by Édouard Manet ==
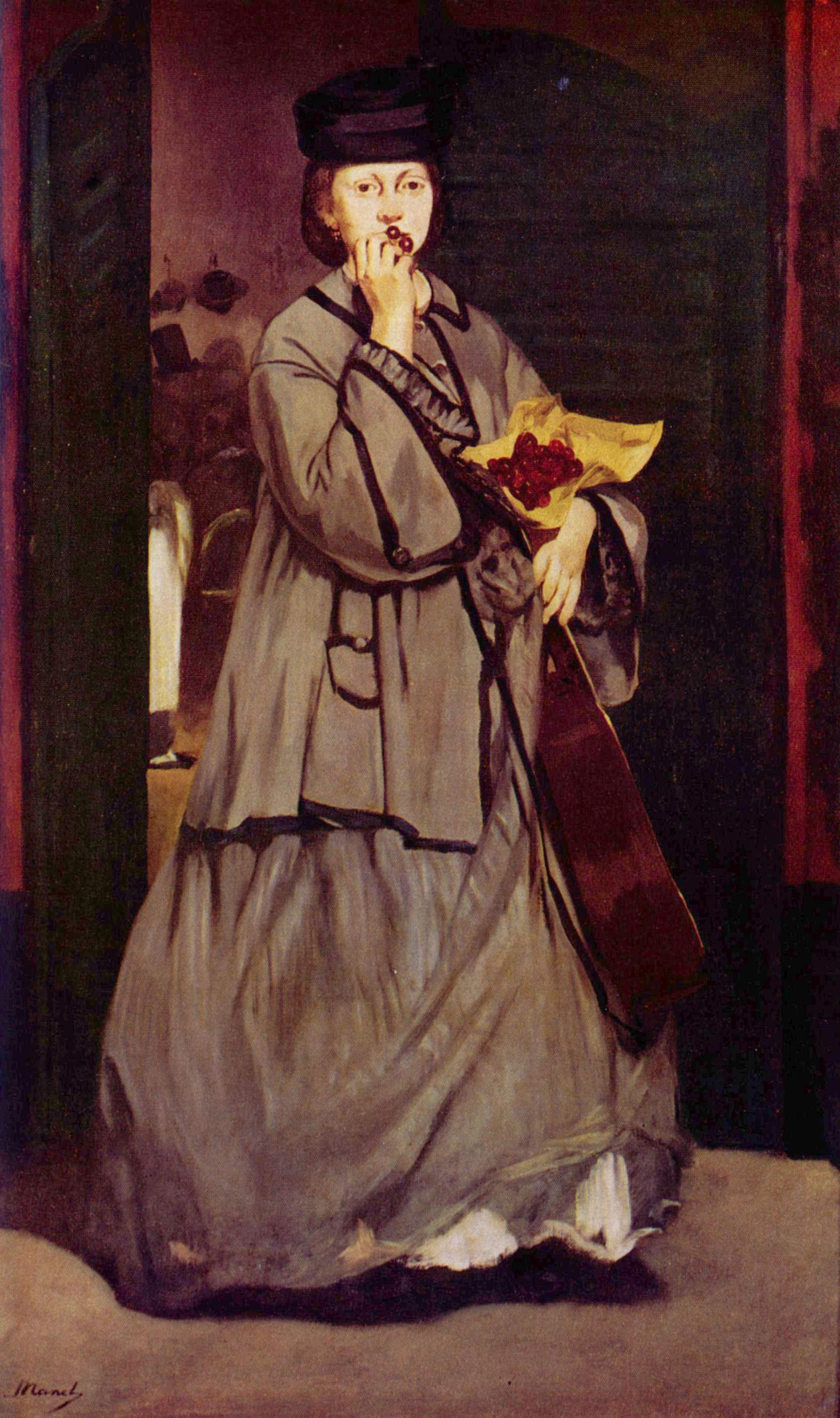
The Street Singer
by Édouard Manet (1862)
Museum of Fine Arts, Boston

Portrait of Victorine Meurent
by Édouard Manet (1862)
Museum of Fine Arts, Boston

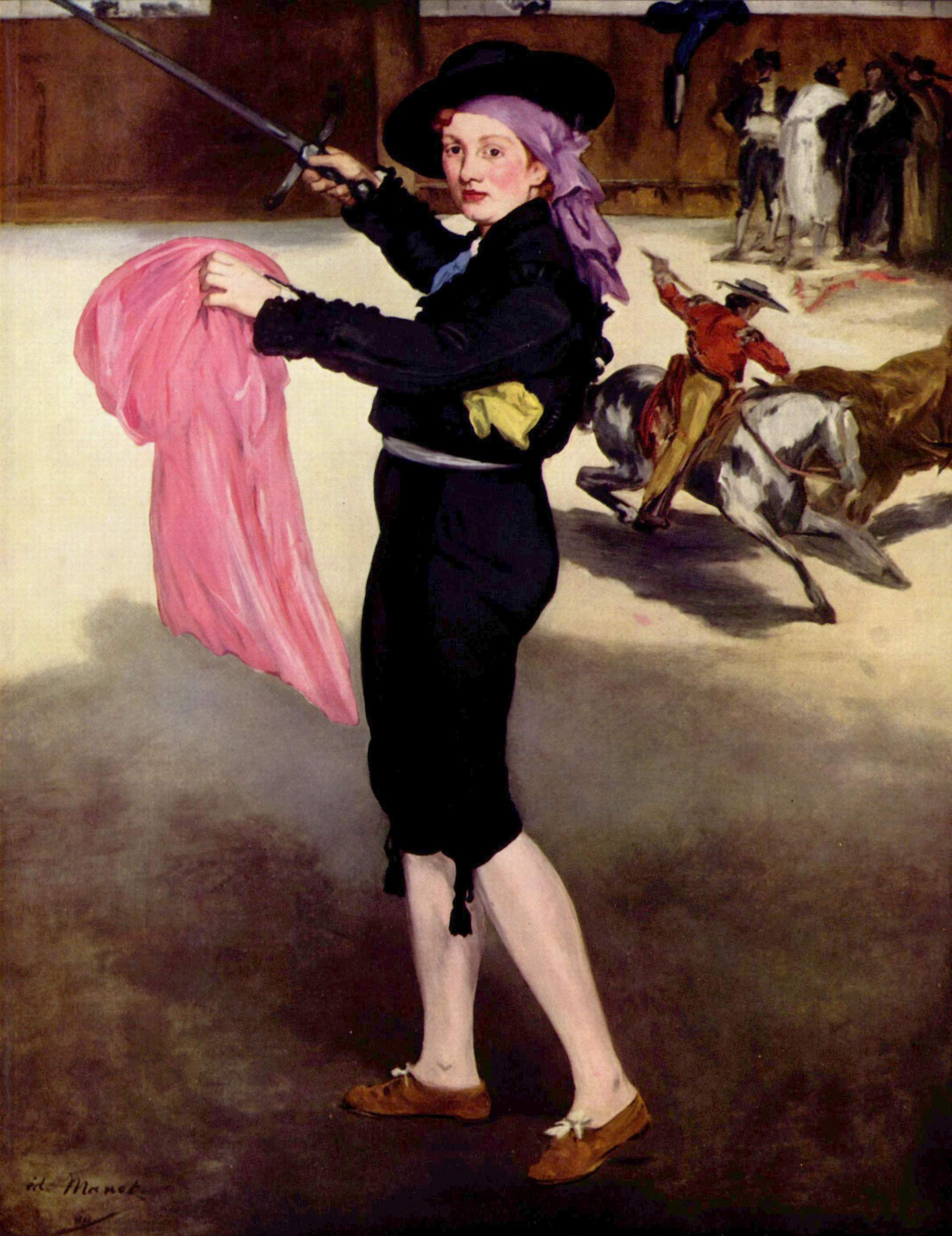
Mademoiselle V. in the Costume of an Espada
by Édouard Manet (1862)
Metropolitan Museum of Art

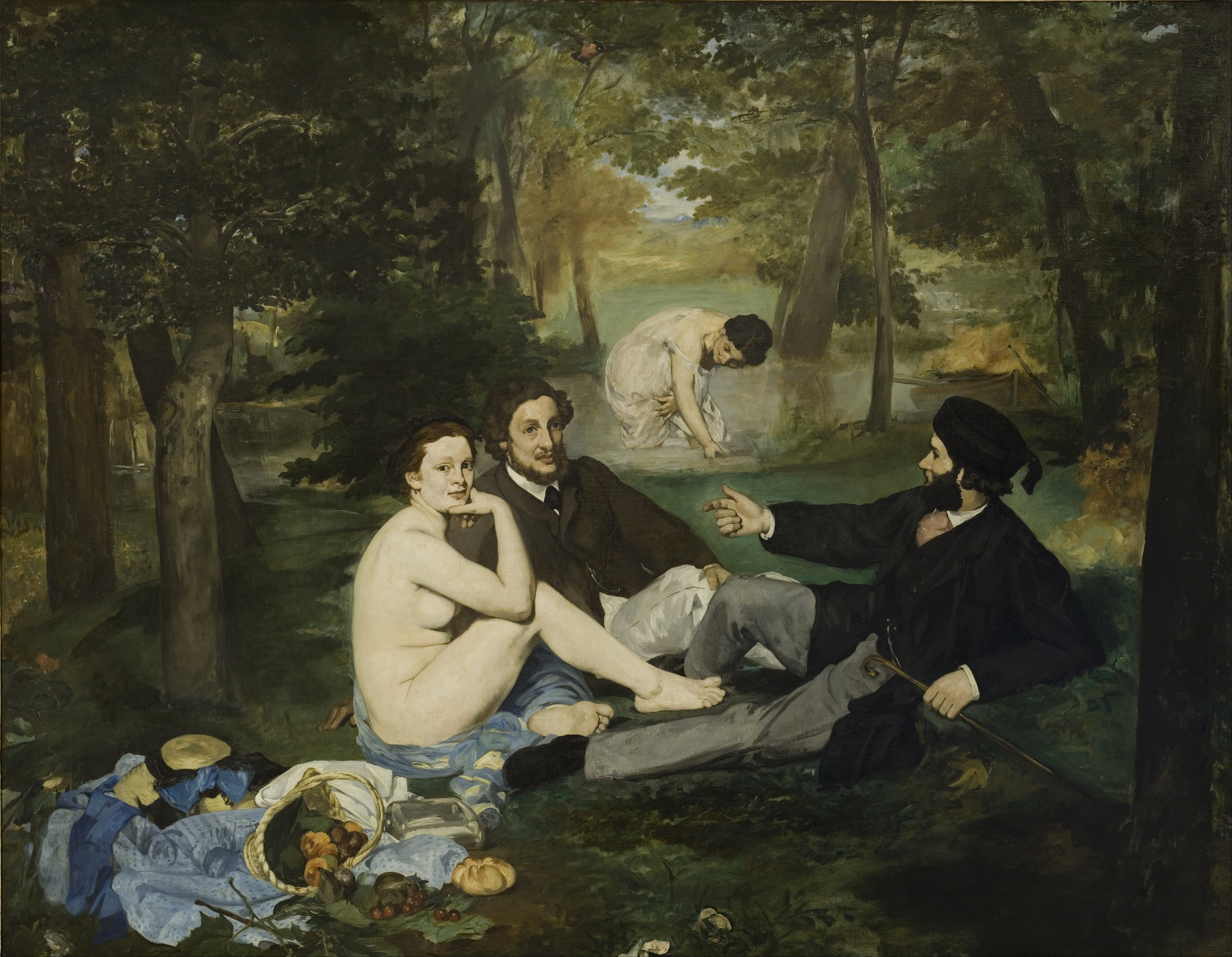
Le Déjeuner sur l'Herbe
by Édouard Manet (1862–1863)
Musée d'Orsay

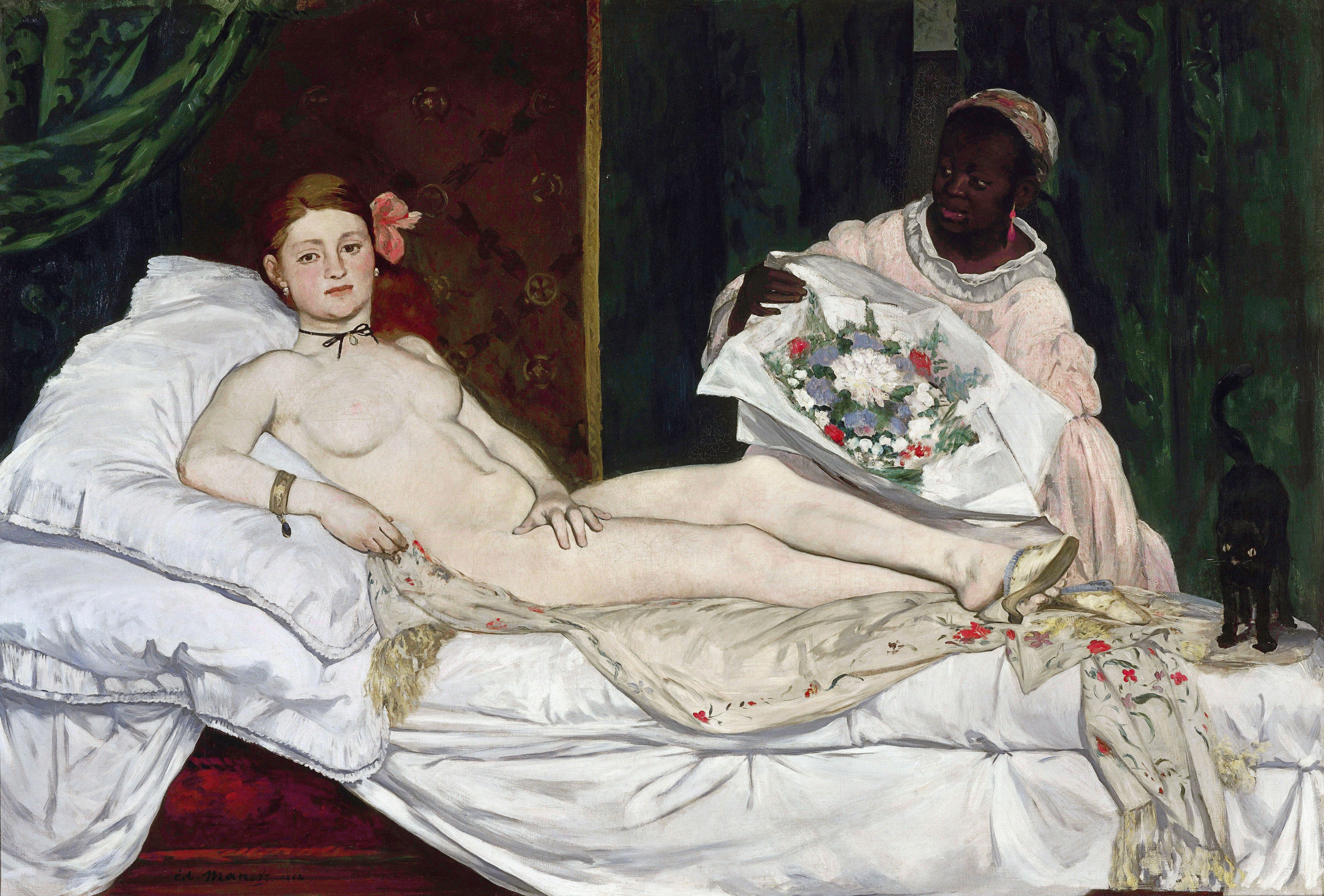
Olympia
by Édouard Manet (1863)
Musée d'Orsay

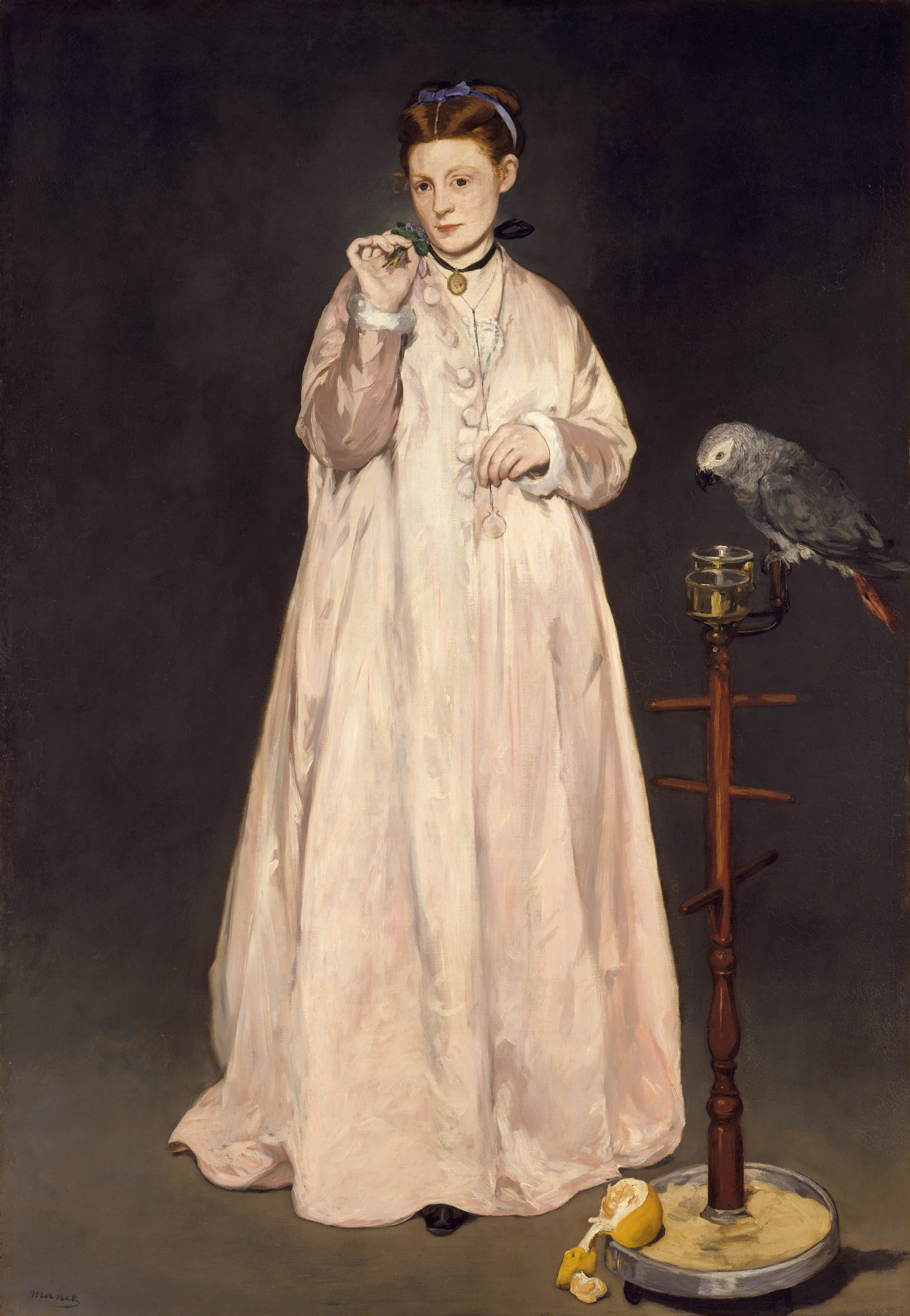
A Young Lady in 1866
by Édouard Manet (1866)
Metropolitan Museum of Art

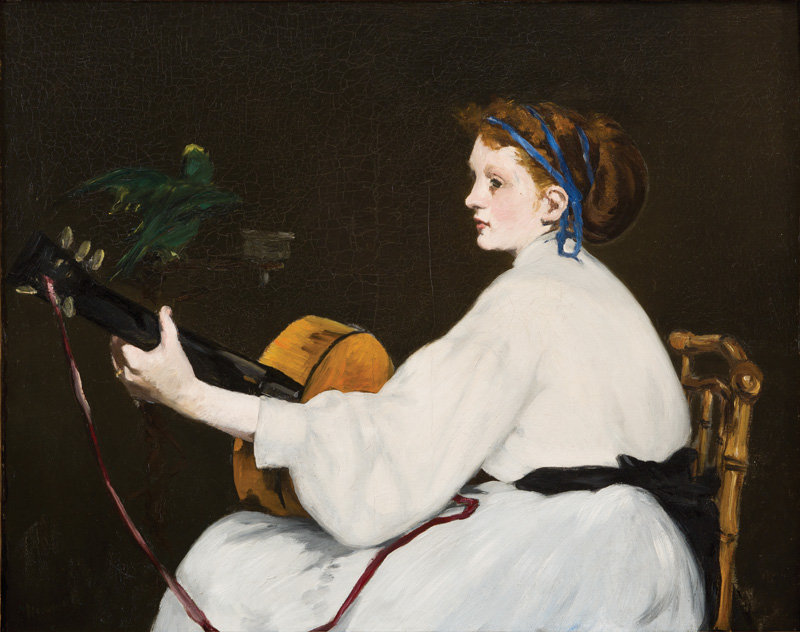
The Guitar Player
by Édouard Manet (c.1866)
Hill-Stead Museum

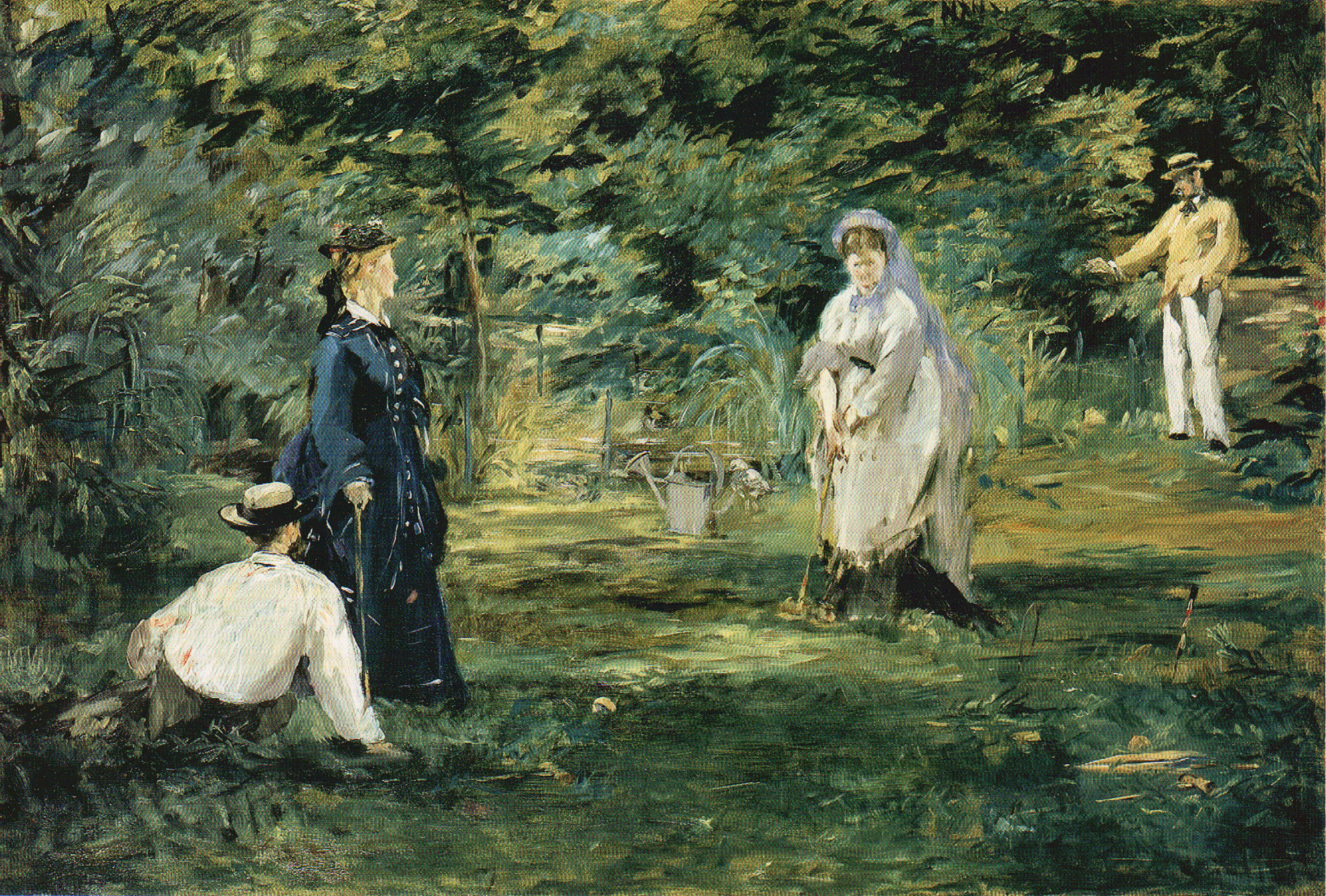
The Croquet Game
by Édouard Manet (1873)
Städel Museum

The Railway
by Édouard Manet (1873)
National Gallery of Art, Washington, D.C.

== In works by Alfred Stevens ==
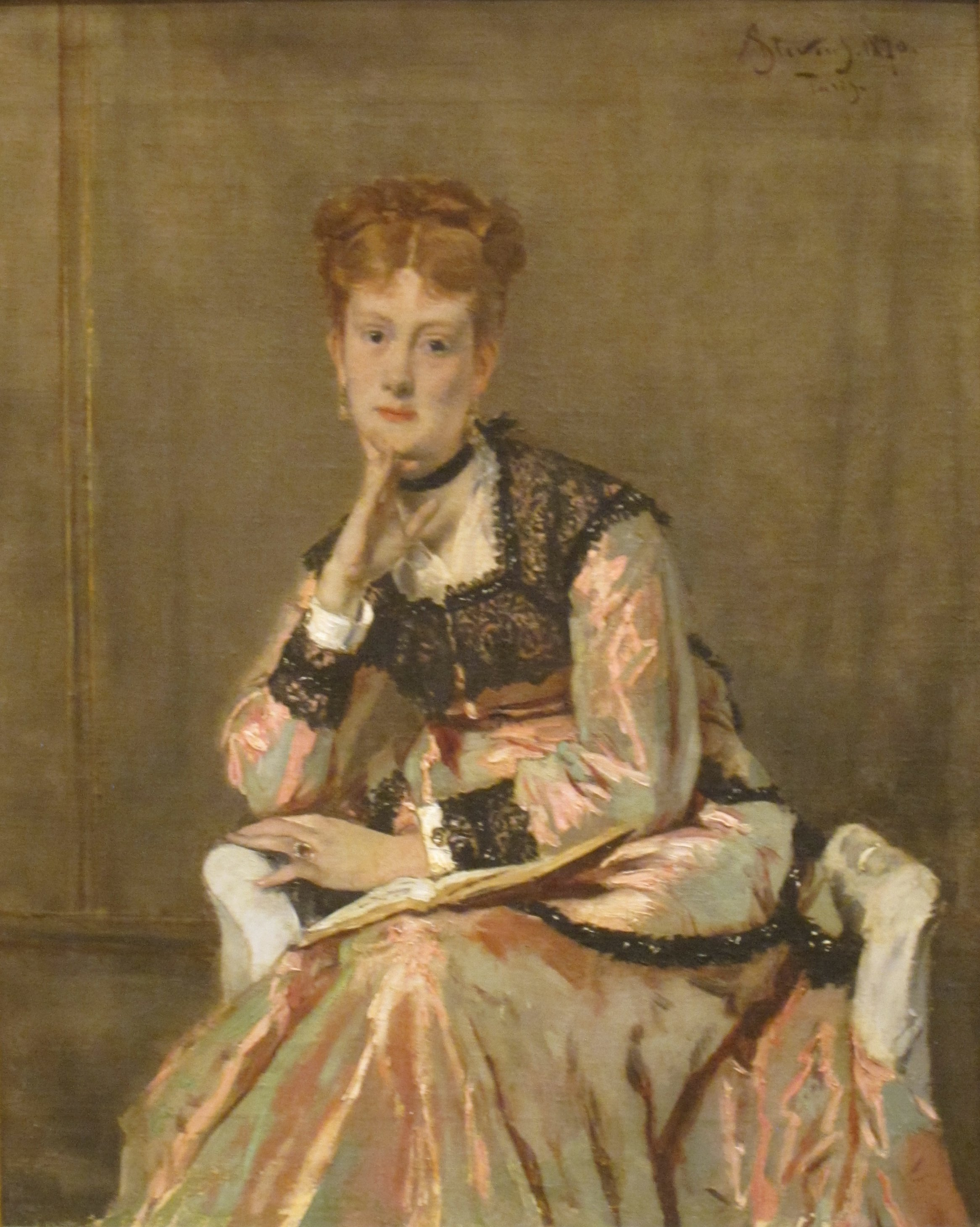
The Parisian Sphinx
by Alfred Stevens (1870)
San Diego Museum of Art

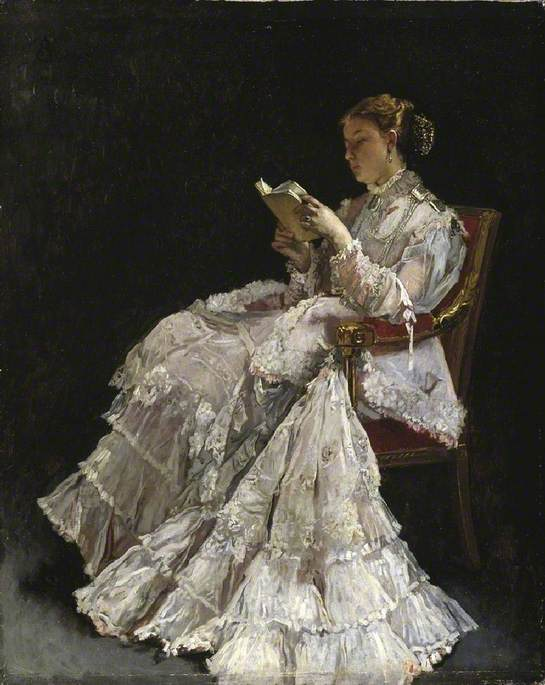
The Reader by Alfred Stevens, Fitzwilliam Museum
