= Street singer (disambiguation) =

A street singer is a street performance artist who performs by singing.

Street Singer or The Street Singer may also refer to:

== Film and theatre ==
- The Street Singer (1912 film), an American short silent film
- The Street Singer (1937 film), a British musical film
- Street Singer (film), a 1938 Indian Hindi film
- The Street Singer (musical), a 1924 British stage musical by Frederick Lonsdale

== Other uses ==
- Street Singer (album), a 1980 album by Tina Brooks and Jackie McLean
- "Street Singer" (song), a 1970 song by the Strangers, with Merle Haggard
- The Street Singer (Manet), an 1862 painting by Édouard Manet
- "The Street Singer", a story in the 1978 graphic novel A Contract with God by Will Eisner
