= The Railway =

1873 painting by Édouard Manet

- Artist: Édouard Manet
- Year: 1873
- Medium: Oil on canvas
- Dimensions: 93.3 cm × 111.5 cm (36 3/4 in × 45 1/8 in)
- Location: National Gallery of Art, Washington, D.C.

The Railway (French: Le Chemin de fer), widely known as Gare Saint-Lazare, is an 1873 painting by Édouard Manet. It is the last painting by Manet of his favourite model, the fellow painter Victorine Meurent, who was also the model for Olympia and the Luncheon on the Grass, among other paintings by Manet. It was exhibited at the Paris Salon in 1874 and donated to the National Gallery of Art in Washington, D.C. in 1956.

== Painting ==
Meurent is depicted sitting to the left side of the frame, in front of an iron fence near the Gare Saint-Lazare in Paris. The pensive subject is wearing a dark hat and sombre deep blue dress with white details, and is looking towards the viewer, while a sleeping puppy, a fan and an open book rest in her lap. Next to her is a little girl, modelled by the daughter of Manet's neighbour Alphonse Hirsch, a contrasting figure wearing a white dress with large blue bow, standing her back to the viewer, watching through the railings as a train passes beneath them. The black band in the girl's hair echoes the black band around the neck of the woman. Instead of choosing the traditional natural view as background for an outdoor scene, Manet opted for the iron grating which "stretches across the canvas." The only evidence of the train is its white cloud of steam. Modern apartment buildings can be seen in the background – including the house on the Rue de Saint-Pétersbourg, near the Place de l'Europe, where Manet had rented a studio since July 1872 — and also a signal box and the Pont de l'Europe.

The arrangement compresses the foreground into a narrow focus, separated from the background by the row of railings. The traditional convention of deep space is ignored. Resting on a parapet to the right of the painting is a bunch of grapes, perhaps indicating that the painting was made in the autumn. The dog may be a reference to Titian's Venus of Urbino; Manet had earlier echoed Titian's composition in his Olympia.

== Reception ==
Historian Isabelle Dervaux has described the reception this painting received when it was first exhibited at the official Paris Salon of 1874: "Visitors and critics found its subject baffling, its composition incoherent, and its execution sketchy. Caricaturists ridiculed Manet's picture, in which only a few recognized the symbol of modernity that it has become today".

Shortly after it was completed, the painting was sold to baritone Jean-Baptiste Faure. It was sold in 1881 for 5,400 francs to the art dealer Paul Durand-Ruel, who gave it several names: Enfant regardant le chemin de fer, Le pont de l'Europe, A la Gare St. Lazare, and later just Gare St. Lazare. It was sold on 31 December 1898 for 100,000 francs to American Henry Osborne Havemeyer. His wife Louisine Havemeyer left 2,000 artworks to the Metropolitan Museum of Art in New York on her death in 1929, but she divided a small collection, including The Railway, among her three children. The painting was donated to the National Gallery of Art in Washington, D.C. in 1956 on the death of her son Horace Havemeyer.

In The Painting of Modern Life, T.J. Clark writes: "The steam and smoke from the railyard ... hang in the air for a few seconds before evaporating. For the little girl watching, time stands still. The woman who looks up at the viewer keeps her place in her book with one finger, expecting the moment to pass: our attention is banal and short-lived (we are male passersby, dragging her out of her identity as governess and chaperone for an instant, but only as long as it takes her to stare us out of countenance), and soon enough we sense that really the woman is somewhere else, still in her novel’s dream of consciousness. Pictures are interceptions: in a second, the air will clear and the reader find her place again in the book. (Or her places, to be more accurate: she seems to be reading back and forth in the story, with finger and thumb keeping two different points of re-entry open.) And yet the book itself, the pages, the streaks of print, the dog-eared cover; the puppy, the bracelet, the snapped-shut fan; the little girl’s hair-ribbon, the gleam on the governess’s straw hat: they are thinglike and permanent—permanent in their mere being for the eye—as only oil paint can make them. Even the steam spreads out with an equal and opposite dull force to the railings that press it back."

== See also ==
- List of paintings by Édouard Manet
- 1873 in art
