= The Street Singer (Manet) =

1862 painting by Édouard Manet

Street Singer
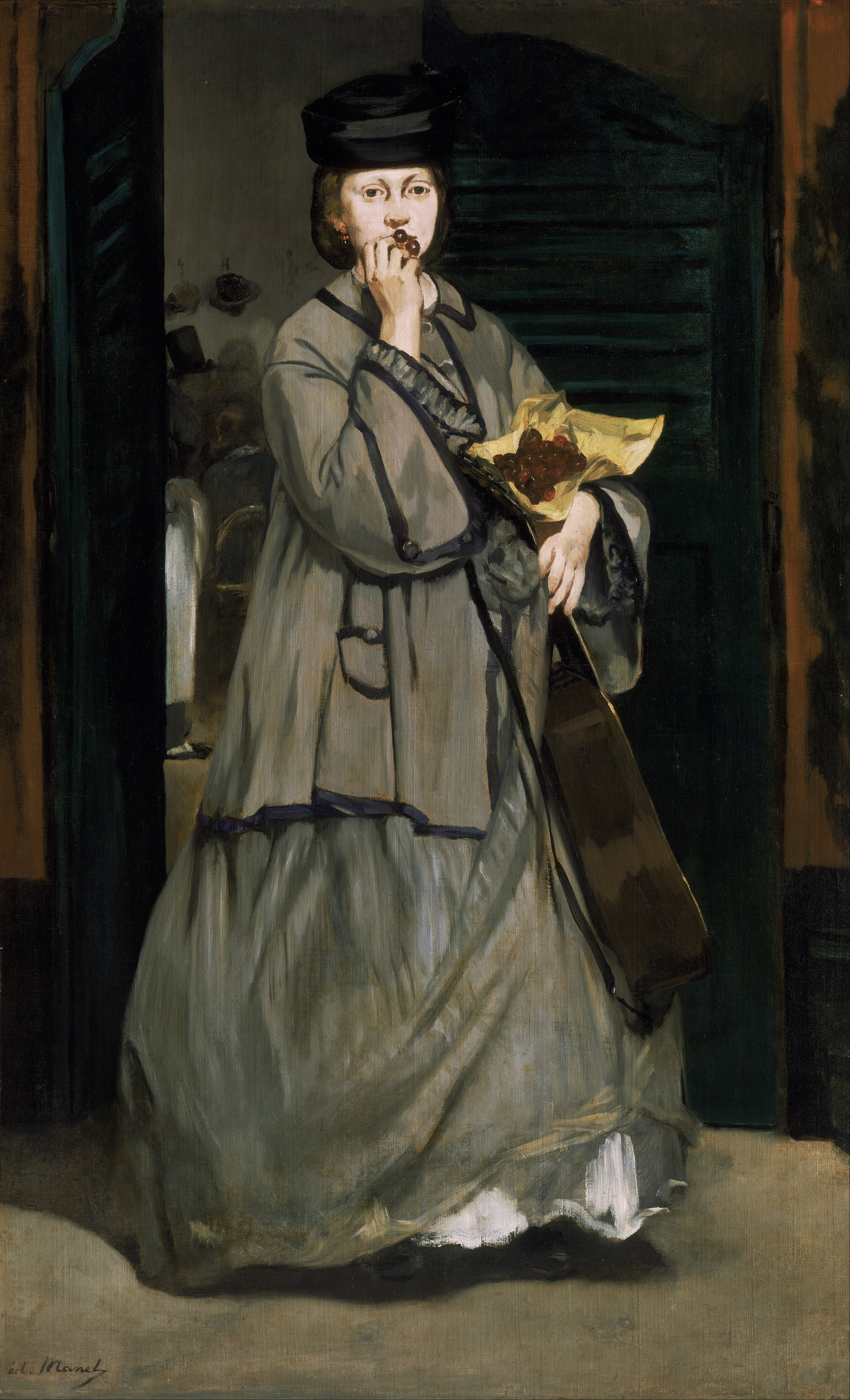
- Year: c. 1862
- Medium: Oil on canvas
- Dimensions: 175.2 cm × 108.5 cm (69.0 in × 42.7 in)
- Location: Museum of Fine Arts, Boston

Street Singer is a c. 1862 oil-on-canvas painting by Édouard Manet depicting a female street musician standing near the entrance to a cabaret.

The painting was inspired by a meeting between the artist and a street singer. Manet asked her to pose for him but she refused, so Manet asked a favorite model, Victorine Meurent, to pose for the work. It is either the first or second of Manet's several large-scale paintings for which Victorine posed. The style of the painting shows the influence of Frans Hals and Spanish masters such as Diego Velázquez.

Street Singer is one of a series of single-figure compositions that Manet painted during the 1860s in which he depicted contemporary "types" at life size, upsetting the convention that such humble genre subjects be painted at a small scale.

The painting was donated to the Boston Museum of Fine Arts in 1966.

== Background ==
=== Subject matter ===
Victorine Louise Meurent, born in 1844, would have been 18 when Manet discovered her and asked her to pose. Besides being Manet's favorite model, she was also an artist herself. Victorine was also painted in Le Bain and Olympia, two other paintings by Manet. According to a biography written by Margaret Seibert, Manet picked different types of models to fit the characters of the paintings he wanted to pursue. In this case, Victorine was chosen by Manet for the guitar singer as she is also a girl of "easy virtue."

=== Creation ===
One day in the early 1860s, Manet and French journalist Antonin Proust were taking a walk to the painter's studio. They saw a woman holding a guitar leaving a café. The artist was amazed by her look and immediately decided to create a painting of her. Manet spoke with the singer and asked her if she would pose for him. The young lady went off laughing and refused. Manet then turned to Victorine as a model for the painting.

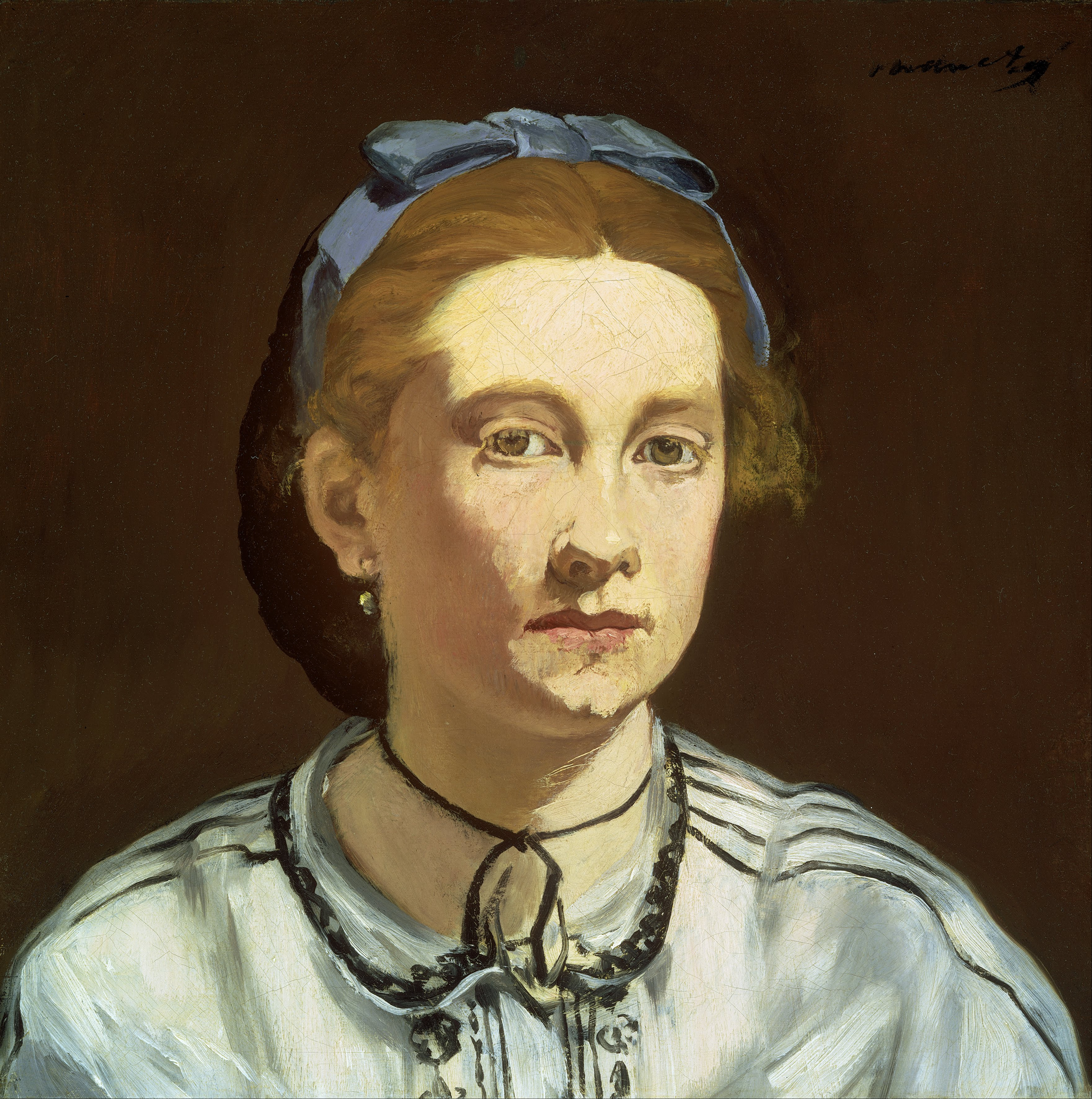
Victorine Meurent (1861-62) by Édouard Manet

== Description ==
Manet depicted an itinerant singer in fashionable contemporary dress leaving a cabaret by night, tightly holding a guitar and eating cherries. Victorine is depicted as a blonde, sharp, and plain young woman well known around the Pantheon Mountains. The features of her face are painted more sharply and slimmer than in other paintings. Her forehead is hidden behind her hat which she wears low on her head. Her nose is defined by deep shadows that form a parenthesis shape on either side. Additionally, it appears that Spanish painter Velázquez inspired Manet in many ways here, especially in the use of color. Manet emphasized the features of Victorine by using a limited palette. Her chin and cheek are barely visible as they were covered by her right hand. Her upper lip is nearly invisible as it is partly covered by the two little ruby cherries on her ring finger and little finger. According to art historian Stéphane Guégan, the cherries were added as an afterthought. Art historian George Mauner says the woman's confrontational stare and her awkward grasp of the cherries and the guitar, "which seems almost too bulky for her to manage comfortably" produces a self-conscious effect that is unexpected in a genre painting.

== Comparison with Mlle V.... in the Costume of an Espada ==
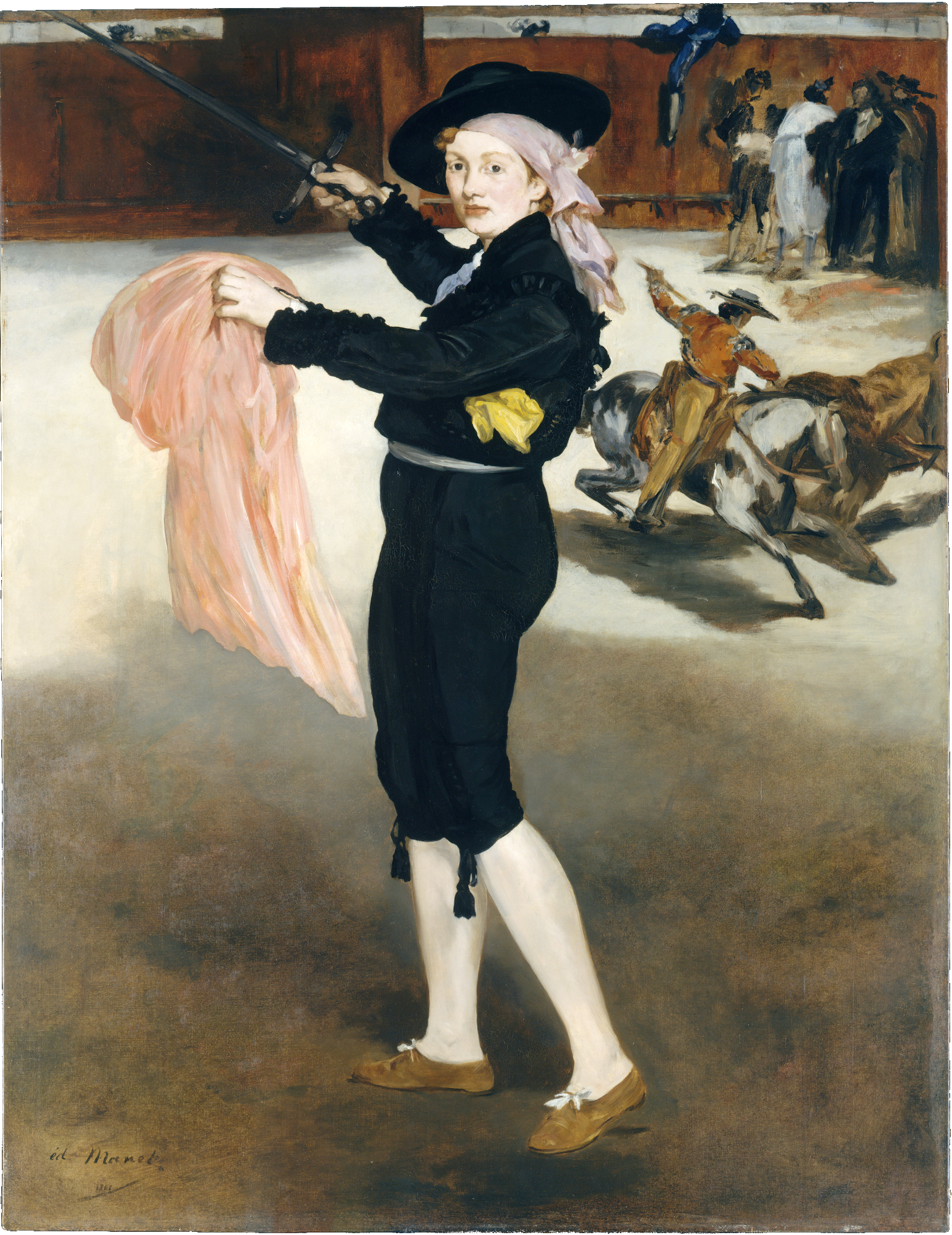
Mlle Victorine Meurent in the Costume of an Espada by Edouard Manet

Victorine also modeled for Manet’s Mlle V.... in the Costume of an Espada. The painting was finished in 1862. Victorine here is depicted as a matador. Her hair is hidden in her pink bandana. Though she is recognizable, her appearance differs from that of Street Singer. For example, she has a double chin and a somewhat chubby face, nose, lips, and jawbone. In Street Singer, Victorine’s dress is more feminine and French while here she appears to be a male Spanish matador.

== Interpretation ==
The art historian and critic Paul Mantz once said: "All form is lost in his big portraits of women, and notably in that of the Singer, where, because of an abnormality we find deeply disturbing, the eyebrows lose their horizontal position and slide vertically down the nose, like two commas of shadow; there is nothing there except the crude conflict of the chalk whites with the black tones. The effect is pallid, hard, sinister... we must ask to be excused from pleading M.Manet's case before the exhibition jury."

On the other hand, Emile Zola, art critic and Manet’s friend, admired the painting as a “keen search for truth”.

These two art critics represent two viewpoints at the time. Mantz favored the traditions of the academy, while Zola promoted a more modern style.

== See also ==
- List of paintings by Édouard Manet
- 1862 in art
