= Amesbury Priory =

Benedictine monastery in Wiltshire, England

- Location within Wiltshire

Monastery information
- Full name: Priory of St Mary and St Melor
- Other name: Amesbury Abbey
- Order: Fontevraud
- Established: 1177
- Disestablished: 1539
- Mother house: Fontevraud Abbey
- Dedication: St Mary and St Melor
- Diocese: Salisbury

People
- Founder: Henry II of England
- Important associated figures: Edward I; Eleanor of Provence, Queen of England; Mary of Woodstock; Eleanor, Fair Maid of Brittany; Eleanor of Brittany; Isabel of Lancaster; Sybil Montagu

Site
- Location: Amesbury, Wiltshire, England
- Coordinates: 51.174°N 1.784°W
- Grid reference: SU152417
- Visible remains: The Church of St Mary and St Melor, Amesbury, is possibly the priory church or the church of the men
- Public access: yes

Amesbury Priory was a Benedictine monastery at Amesbury in Wiltshire, England, belonging to the Order of Fontevraud. It was founded in 1177 to replace the earlier Amesbury Abbey, a Saxon foundation established about the year 979. The Anglo-Norman Amesbury Priory was disbanded at the Dissolution of the monasteries and ceased to exist as a monastic house in 1539.

While the earlier Amesbury Abbey had been exclusively a nunnery or house of women, its successor, Amesbury Priory, following the particular structures of its parent Order of Fontevraud, was both a convent of nuns and a corresponding monastery of men. Both were governed locally by a prioress and ultimately by the Abbess of Fontevraud, in Anjou, part of the territories in what is now France that were then ruled by the English royal house.

Nothing remains of the priory above ground, its site having been used for a mansion which re-uses the name Amesbury Abbey.

== Foundation ==
In 1177 Henry II resolved upon suppressing Queen Ælfthryth (Elfrida)'s Saxon foundation known as Amesbury Abbey, a Benedictine nunnery then almost two centuries old. He founded in its place a house of the Order of Fontevraud, a Benedictine reform. Henry's plan was confirmed by a bull of Pope Alexander III dated 15 September 1176, which ordered that the Archbishop of Canterbury and the bishops of London, Exeter and Worcester formally notify in person the nuns of the intended change and offer them the possibility of remaining in the new institution. In the event, none did.

The initiative to re-found at Amesbury was presented officially as part of a general movement to reform monasteries in England, and an inspection was carried out at the existing Abbey which claimed to have uncovered a situation of laxity and immoral conduct. The abbess was reported to have had three children. Though it was said that some of the existing nuns were willing to mend their ways and so received the offer to remain, in fact the entire community of some 30 nuns vacated the house, including the last incumbent Abbess, Beatrice, who was dismissed with a pension.

Gerald of Wales (Giraldus Cambrensis), no admirer of Henry II, narrates that in 1174 the King had vowed to make a pilgrimage to Jerusalem but three years later he successfully asked the Pope to be released from it, on condition that he instead found three monasteries. The takeover of Amesbury Abbey was, Gerald alleges, an inexpensive way of founding at least one. However, contrary to this accusation, the records show that in fact Henry spend heavily on his foundation, even though the endowments of the existing monastery were carried over. The manor of Winterbourne was owned by the monastery according to the Domesday Book of 1086, and was still among its possessions at the Dissolution.

Once the abbey had been liquidated, Henry II then had a new founding group come from Fontevraud, amounting to 21 or 24 nuns, led by a former subprioress. In addition some nuns were also brought from Westwood Priory in Worcestershire, likewise a Fontevraud house. The ceremony on 22 May 1177 to install the new community could scarcely have been grander, being led by the Archbishop of Canterbury, assisted by several other bishops, and in the presence of the King.

Henry subsequently spent some £880 on the monastery building over several years. When the works were completed, another solemn ceremony was held on 30 November 1186 in the presence of the Abbess of Fontevraud and once again of the King.

== Order of Fontevraud ==
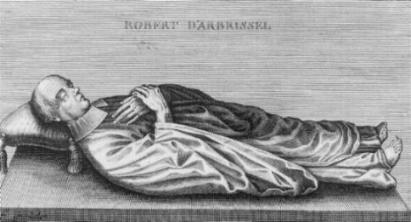
Robert of Arbrissel: his lost tomb effigy at Fontevraud Abbey in central France

This act of favour of Henry II towards the Order of Fontevraud was not an isolated one in the course of his long reign (1133–1189). Before revamping the foundation at Amesbury, Henry had already established, roughly between 1133 and 1164, three other Fontevraud houses in England: Westwood Priory (Worcestershire), Eaton or Nuneaton Priory (Warwickshire) and Grovebury Priory (Bedfordshire), Henry's actions at Amesbury, therefore, brought the total of Fontevraud houses in England to four, after which no others were ever established.

It is known that the Plantagenets were great benefactors of the mother abbey at Fontevraud in its early years and Henry II's widow, Eleanor of Aquitaine, took up residence there. More generally, that monastery, founded in 1101, became the chosen mausoleum of the Angevin dynasty and the centre of a new monastic Order, the Order of Fontevraud.

The Fontevraud monastic reform had two notable distinguishing features. Firstly, it followed in part the model established by the highly influential and prestigious Cluny Abbey, which by the 12th century numbered more than a thousand monasteries.) in adopting a centralized form of government. While most Benedictine monasteries remained autonomous and associated with each other only loosely, Cluny created a federated order in which the superiors of subsidiary houses were deputies of the Abbot of Cluny, the Order's head. These subsidiary houses were hence usually styled priories, not abbeys, governed therefore not by abbots but by priors, or more technically obedientiary priors. The head of the Order of Fontevraud was the Abbess of Fontevraud. At the death in about 1117 of the founder, Robert of Arbrissel, she already had under her rule 35 priories, and by the end of that century about 100, in France, Spain and England.

The second characteristic feature of Fontevraud was that its houses were double monasteries, with separately housed convents of both men and women, under a common superior, a prioress. The men had their own male superior, but he was subject to the prioress. Local circumstances seem, however, to have modified this formula in some locations. For example, Grovebury Priory, a Fontevraud monastery in Bedfordshire, was a small house of men that never had any nuns. In many locations there was in effect a house of women to which was attached a small house of chaplains that had little to distinguish it from many others that had no links with Fontevraud, such as the Augustinian canonesses house Campsey Priory in Suffolk. At Amesbury Priory the ordained men are referred to in the historical records as "canons" or "chaplains" not "monks". They should in theory have been monks. This calls to mind the usages of an English reform movement, the Gilbertine Order, which also had double monasteries. In each of the latter, the key component was a nunnery run on almost Cistercian lines, and hence ultimately following the Rule of St Benedict, while the annexed male house were canons regular, living according to a variant of the Rule of St Augustine. It would appear that at Fontevraud there was a degree of evolution of Rule and structures, even in the choice of Rule of the men, which later became that of St Benedict.

With the passing of the Plantagenet dynasty, Fontevraud and her dependencies began to fall upon hard times, and it was said that a moment came at Fontevraud when they had only the blackest of bread to eat on Fridays. On the Continent the decline was worsened by the devastation of the 14th century Hundred Years War. In 1460 a canonical visitation of some fifty of the Order's priories revealed that most were barely occupied, if not totally abandoned.

== At Amesbury ==
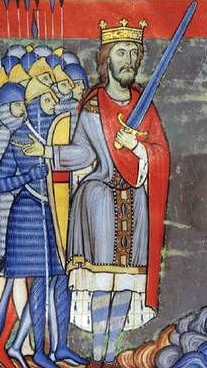
King Henry II, founder of Amesbury Priory

Although the later Amesbury monastery is popularly referred to as an "Abbey", this is not strictly speaking exact. Presumably the mistaken usage is accounted for by the fading memory of historical facts after the Reformation, aided by the elimination of Catholicism, and later the inroads of Romanticism. Doubtless also the search for an elegant name for the later nearby mansion counted for something. The Saxon monastery appears to have truly been an abbey, but the Fontevraud daughter house was always technically a priory.

Amesbury Priory's relations with the mother house were only sporadically recorded. In 1203, under King John, the Prioress of Amesbury was made the channel for paying to the Abbess of Fontevraud a rent out of the Exchequer for the support of a chaplain who would pray for the soul of John's mother, Eleanor of Aquitaine, who herself years before had given 20 marks to Amesbury for prayers for the soul of her late husband, John's father, Henry II. In 1221 the then Abbess of Fontevraud, Berthe, affixed her seal to confirm a gift made by Amesbury. Not many years later, Berthe was succeeded by Adela of Brittany, a member of the ducal house, who ruled in the years 1228–1244. Adela was said to have been brought up at Amesbury.

A visit in January 1256 from John, the sacrist of Fontevraud, highlights some interesting details. Arrived at Amesbury, he summoned the prioress, prior, cellaress, chaplains, and lay brothers before him and inspected the prior's accounts. It emerged that income was £100 from rents and £40 from wool, while expenditure was £180, though the house was not in debt. It held 59 charters. There was a complement of a prioress and 76 nuns, a prior and 6 other chaplains, a clerk, and 16 lay brothers, some of whom lived at the priory's granges. Valuable items, largely confined to the chapels, were 4 chalices of silver gilt, 2 silver cups, 2 silver crosses, and 2 censers. In livestock, the priory possessed 4, 280 sheep, 200 oxen, 7 cows, 4 calves, 23 horses and 300 swine over a year old. Mention is made of a previous audit undertaken as recently as 21 September 1255. In 1256 the house was short of corn, which was perhaps a recurrent local problem since in 1189 Richard I had made a grant of £10 for corn.

The Abbess of Fontevraud in 1265–1276, Joan de Dreux, faced various difficulties in the mother house. It seems that on the advice of Edward I she withdrew to Amesbury with her two nieces and another nun, and governed the Order from there.

At the end of the century, in 1293, the office of prioress of Amesbury fell vacant and to fill it the nuns held an election. Princess Mary (acting for the abbess), supported by the prior, contested the election, on the grounds that the right to provide belonged to Fontevraud. When the quarrel reached the King, he appointed the Bishops of Durham and Bishop of Lincoln to take up the spiritual government of the house, choosing a nun as their intermediary, until the matter was resolved. The solution came when the king asked the abbess to send one of her own nuns to Amesbury as prioress, and in 1294 the capable Joan de Jennes arrived. The king, who had already visited Amesbury in person in August 1293, issued a royal confirmation of the new prioress's election. He visited the priory again to see the new prioress in action in August 1294.

A 1341 letter of King Edward III to Amesbury Priory during the Hundred Years' War disputed some of the rights of the abbess and restricted others. In the light of this, when the prioress died about 1349 the nuns played safe and sought the king's licence to elect. This created a precedent for the future that was followed in 1379 and 1391.

While it does not seem completely certain, it is likely that sometime after 1403 the priory became "denizen", i.e. naturalised English, and so immune to the further measures against alien priories that came in 1414. However, apparently in contradiction to this is the fact that when in 1486 Dame Alice Fisher was elected prioress, she sent a priest said to be her chaplain to the Abbess of Fontevraud with gifts in token of submission. In reply received a cordial letter, dated 16 May 1486, which confirmed her in the office, recalled the nature of the Order and the importance of observing the statutes and of keeping the obits of Robert d'Arbrissel, Henry II, Richard I, and Eleanor of Aquitaine. Admittedly, this is the last recorded contact of Amesbury with the mother house and it is not sure that under the Tudors an effective connection was maintained.

At Amesbury there is no explicit mention of men until the charter of 1189, whereas there is talk of a chaplain in 1180 and a prior in 1194. To this can be added the mention in 1256 of a prior, 6 other chaplains and a clerk, along with 16 lay brothers, In the next century, there were 12 chaplains, including the prior in 1315–1316 and two fresh clerks were ordained in 1315–1316, which presumably explains the total of 14 chaplains and clerks in 1317–1318. In that year there were also 6 lay brothers. In 1381, however, there was a drop to 8 brethren, only one of whom a priest, and one lay brother. In general it looks as though there was in principle a fixed number of 12 chaplains in the 14th century, a figure confirmed in the investigations into the troubles of 1400, when the then prioress had apparently been attempting to reduce this to four chaplain-canons, replacing the others with secular priests.

In the mid-14th century the Prior of Amesbury seems to emerge for a time as a more prominent figure. In 1355 the then prior paid a visit to the mother house and for the two years following was the abbesses's proctor in England. After the 1360 Treaty of Brétigny between England and France, the restrictions on the abbess's control of the English Fontevraud estates were lifted. At that point the Queen, Philippa of Hainault, wrote personally to Fontevraud asking the abbess to instruct the Prioress of Amesbury to appoint William of Amesbury as prior, singing her candidate's praises. The commissioner sent by the abbess to ensure this arrived in the summer of 1361 and duly installed William as prior and had him swear allegiance to the abbess. In 1365 the Prior of Amesbury conducted an inquiry on behalf of the abbess into alleged crimes committed at Amesbury's sister house Nuneaton Priory.

Like the mother Abbey of Fontevraud, Amesbury, for all its royal connections and its institutional endowments, appears to have known real poverty at times, as did its sister houses at Westwood and Nuneaton. As to poverty, only at Grovebury among the Fontevraud English dependencies is there no mention of it. This house was (unlike the others) regarded as an alien priory (i.e., a particular category of English dependency of a French mother-house) and would have suffered various types of more severe harassment whenever there were hostilities between France and England. Like others of similar status, it was to be suppressed in 1414.

== Life of the Priory ==
While even in the absence of recorded specifics, we must suppose that the daily life at Amesbury Priory went on as in any monastery of its type, the relations with the royal house remained a constant at least till the end of the fifteenth century. It was undoubtedly the leading Fontevraud house in England and in this period it reflected the tendency already established at the mother house for its heads to be women of high rank.

In the reigns of Richard I (1189–1199) and John (1199–1216) there was a gradual increase in the estates of Amesbury Priory, including the acquisition in 1197 of 78 acres nearby in Barford St Martin.

In 1202 King John effectively cleared the prioress's debts. He also gave her £18 in 1207.

Henry II had made some grants in kind doubtlessly gratefully received, such as the provision which allowed of firewood the nuns to take five cartloads of wood daily from Chute, Grovely, Winterslow, Bentley and Wallop woods. These rights regarding Bentley and Grovely were certainly still being exercised in 1255, and in 1271–1272 in Winterslow and Bentley, though in the latter only 6 cartloads of wood a week were being drawn at that period.

Henry III maintained the Plantagenet interest in the Order of Fontevraud. He visited Amesbury in 1223, 1231, 1241, and 1256 and in 1270 he inspected and renewed Henry II's charter. He also granted various items of income and privileges. Hence, in 1231 firewood was granted out of Buckholt, Chute and Grovely woods and 6 quarters of nuts out of Clarendon Wood. The next year more firewood for the priory kiln was granted from Grovely next year and in 1256 from Chute.

The crown intervened also with materials to assist in the enlarging of the monastery buildings, so that grants of timber were made in 1226 to build the infirmary chapel, in 1231 to repair the cloister and the nuns' stalls, in 1234–1235 for work on the church, further grants e in 1241 and 1249. For roofing the canons’ church in 1246 there was a grant of lead. Edward I made a gift of timber in 1300, when his daughter Mary was a nun in the house.

Amesbury Priory seems to have conformed to a general tendency in England as the Middle Ages waned for the proportion of aristocratic nuns in nunneries to decline. An example of this can be seen in the Abbey of the Minoresses of St. Clare without Aldgate in London, whose initial heavy royal connections seem to have imparted from the outset a certain cachet to the house such that in the early days aspiring nuns had to be of noble birth, whereas by the 14th century the daughters of wealthy merchants were also entering. At Amesbury a similar trend became marked by the early 16th century, the social recruitment pool there being the gentry families.

It also seems that by the 15th century the close link between the royal family and Amesbury Priory that formerly existed had faded, so that when Henry VI visited the priory in 1435 it was a great rarety. On 2 October 1501 Princess Catherine of Aragon landed at Plymouth and proceeded by road via Exeter to her wedding to Arthur, Prince of Wales in Saint Paul's Cathedral on 14 November. At one of her halts she was brought to spend the night of 2 November at Amesbury Priory.

=== The Amesbury Psalter ===
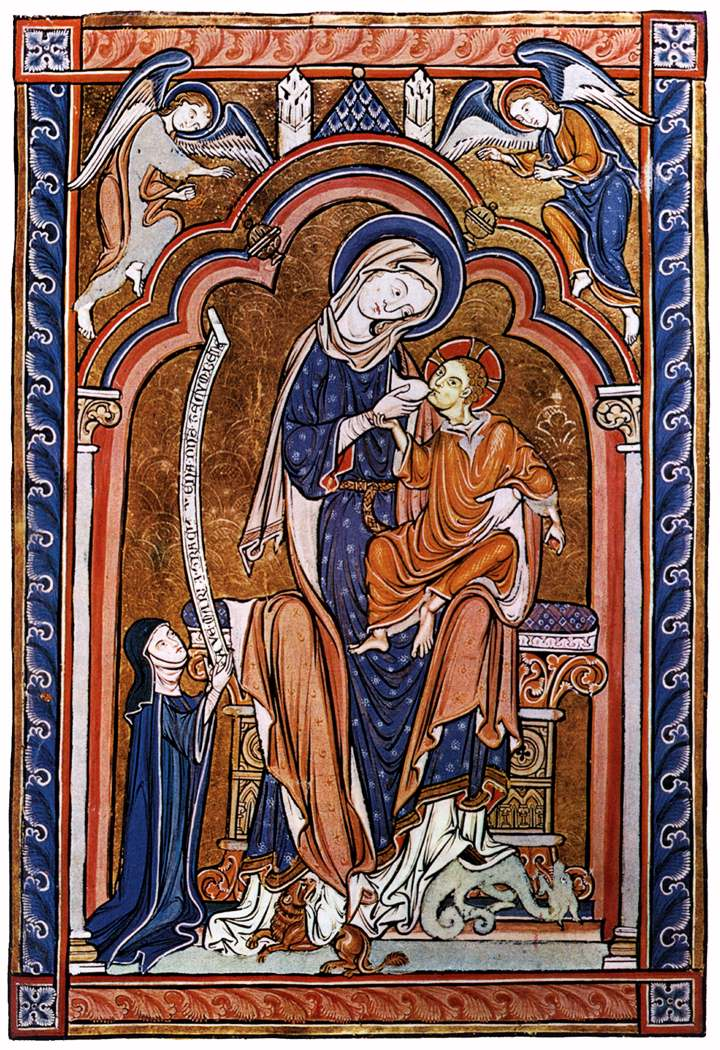
Page from the Amesbury Psalter (English, c. 1249)

A 13th-century illuminated psalter of English workmanship (All Souls College, Oxford, Ms. 6) is known as the Amesbury Psalter. Dated around c. 1250, it is one of a group of five illuminated manuscripts (comprising another psalter, a missal, a bible, and an apocalypse) produced in the period 1245–1255 and illuminated by an unknown artist known as the Sarum Illuminator. A consensus regards them as representing the attainment of maturity by the English early Gothic style. The Amesbury Psalter is regarded as the finest of them all and has been described as "the purest gem of English medieval painting". It contains two mentions of the feasts of St Melor, the Amesbury patron Saint, but in other respects does not seem to follow exactly the Amesbury calendar and is likely to have been owned not by a nun but by a wealthy laywoman. It contains four full-page miniatures, as well as various illuminated initials.

== Prioresses of Amesbury ==
The list that follows is incomplete.

- Joan d'Osmont (late in reign of Henry II, who died 1189)
- Emeline (1208, 1215, 1221)
- Felicia (1227, 1237–1238)
- Ida (1256, 1272–1273)
- Alice (1290)
- Margaret (1293, mentioned as former prioress 10 June 1294)
- Joan de Jenes, Genes or Gennes (1294, 1306, 1309)
- Isabel de Geinville, Geyville, or Jeonville (1309, 1337)
- Isabel of Lancaster (mentioned as nun 1340; as prioress 1343, 1347; died before 4 February 1349)
- Margery of Purbrook (1349; Royal assent to election. died before 28 October 1379)
- Eleanor St. Manifee (1379;Royal assent to election. died before 20 November 1391)
- Sibyl Montague (1391; Royal assent to election. died before 10 September 1420)
- Mary Gore (election prioress 28 November 420; died 13 January 1437)
- Joan Benfeld (1437, 1466; died before 4 April 1467)
- Joan or Juliana Arnold (1467, 1474; died before 6 December 1480)
- Alice Fisher (1480, 1486, 1491; 1497)
- Katherine Dicker (1502, 1504, 1507)
- Christine Fountleroy (1509, 1519)
- Florence Bonnewe (1523, 1524, 1527, 1535, resigned 10 August 1539)
- Joan Darrell (1536, 1537, 1538; surrendered 4 December 1539)

There is also mention in the documents of surrender of a Joan Howell "former high prioress". There is no confirmation elsewhere of this information but it remains perhaps a possibility that she was indeed prioress after Dame Fisher, Dame Dicker or Dame Founterloy.

== Priors of Amesbury ==
The list that follows is incomplete.

- John (1194)
- Robert (1198)
- John de Vinci (about 1215, 1221–1222, 1229)
- Thomas (1255)
- Peter (1293)
- John of Figheldean (before 1315–1316)
- Richard of Greenborough (1316–1319)
- John of Holt (1356, 1357)
- William of Amesbury (1361)
- John Winterbourne (1381)
- Robert Dawbeney (before 1399)

After Robert Dawbeney we find no further mention of priors and it seems likely in view of the drama of his destitution that the system changed so that the former parallel male community was reduced to merely a group of secular priests appointed as chaplains.

== Women of Rank ==
=== Eleanor of Brittany ===
Eleanor of Brittany (1275–1342) was born in England as the daughter of John II, Duke of Brittany and Earl of Richmond and his wife Beatrice of England, who was the daughter of Henry III of England and Eleanor of Provence. It was the latter who arranged that her granddaughter would enter Amesbury Priory in 1281, at the age of seven, with a view to becoming a nun, though for that she had to wait until she reached the customary age. The girl had lost her mother Beatrice on 24 March 1275, shortly after her birth. She remained at Amesbury Priory the best part of a decade.

In early 1286 she was joined by Mary of Woodstock, infant daughter of Edward I, also a granddaughter of Eleanor of Provence, and also waiting to become a nun. As a sign of personal earnest, her grandmother the queen mother purchased for her support both Chaddleworth manor along with the advowson of the local Poughley Priory (Berkshire), income from which young Eleanor enjoyed for life and then both passed into the possessions of Amesbury Priory. Some months later still, in June 1286, the girls' grandmother arrived in person to take up residence, not as a nun but as a pious royal widow.

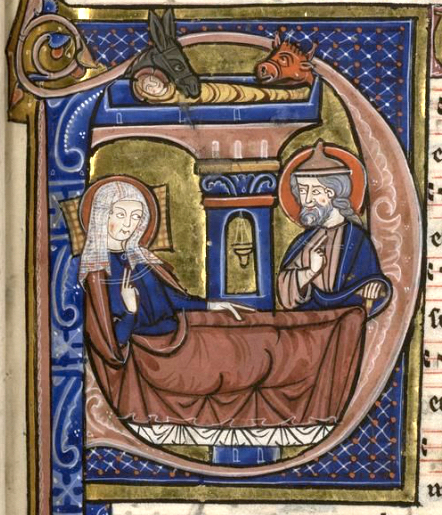
Gradual of Eleanor of Brittany, detail

Ever since Eleanor of Brittany's arrival at Amesbury she had experienced not infrequent visits to the house by Edward I. In 1291 he came no less than three times: February 1291, for the burial of Eleanor of Provence, in September 1291 and yet again in November. During the latter visit the still young Eleanor, now aged about 17, took the veil in the King's presence. For whatever reason, shortly afterwards she moved to the mother house Fontevraud Abbey. There she would in due course take her vows and become a nun. By 1304 she was abbess there.

It is known that both Eleanor and Mary were at Amesbury rather than Fontevraud, largely at the instance of their grandmother, against the wishes of King Edward I’s Queen, Eleanor of Castile. The death of her grandmother doubtless meant that the young Eleanor was both under less constraint and to some extent enjoyed less immediate protection. Perhaps, too, she and her closer family felt that her future more naturally lay on the Continent, especially given the divide opened up by Edward I's general imperialism and his renewal of military operations to secure territories for the English crown there. Perhaps, too, Amesbury was a little too crowded with princesses.

Upon Eleanor of Brittany's induction as the sixteenth abbess of Fontevraud, a richly illuminated Gradual was presented to her. This she bequeathed to the abbey. It survives to this day and is conserved in the public library of Limoges.

=== Mary of Woodstock ===
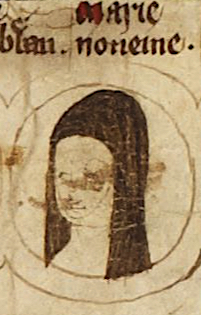
Mary of Woodstock

Mary of Woodstock, born 11/12 March 1279, was a younger daughter of King Edward I and his wife Eleanor of Castile. It would seem that both Mary and her cousin Eleanor of Brittany had in the first instance been destined to enter Amesbury's mother house at Fontevraud, but that their grandmother Eleanor of Provence, had convinced her son the King, Edward I, to send them instead to Amesbury. There seems to have been no doubt in the family that both were destined to become nuns. At the age of seven, Mary underwent what was most probably a ceremony of oblation at Amesbury on Assumption Day, 15 August 1285, though she did not receive the veil as a nun (or more likely as a novice) until December 1291, when she had reached the age of twelve.

With the death of her grandmother at Amesbury in 1291, it was apparently expected that Mary would move to Fontevraud, as Eleanor of Brittany in fact did. The prioress of Fontevraud wrote several times to Edward I to this end. Possibly to prevent his daughter falling into French hands in the event of war with England, Edward refused, and Mary remained at Amesbury, while her allowance was doubled to £200 per year. In 1292, she was also given the right to forty oaks per year from royal forests and twenty tuns of wine per year from Southampton.

In 1293 Mary can be seen, now freed from the shadow of her grandmother, intervening in the internal running of the priory. That year she contested the election of a prioress and was presumably the prime mover through the king for the importation of a new prioress from Fontevraud, then confirmed by the king, who in connection with the whole affair issued detailed orders on a large scale concerning both spiritualities and temporalities and personally visited Amesbury in August 1293 and August 1294.

Hostilities between England and France throughout the Middle Ages occasioned problems for monasteries in England that had French connections. When war broke out again in 1294, contacts with the mother house must have been impeded. It may have been for that reason that the Abbess of Fontevraud, some time before March 1300, appointed the Princess Mary her vicegerent in England, and as such Mary is known to have issued several documents in the period 1301–1309. In one dated 1301 she assumes the grand style "Maria illustris regis Anglie nata vices reverende matris domine Margarete dei gracia Fontis Ebraudi abbatisse in Anglia gerens" ("Mary daughter of the illustrious King of England, vicegerent of the Reverend mother Dame Margaret, by the grace of God Abbess of Fontevraud"). In 1309 there was another vacancy for prioress at Amesbury and Mary proposed that the abbess (by then it was Eleanor of Brittany) appoint an Amesbury nun. When Eleanor favoured appointing instead a French prioress and prior, it was Mary, through the king, who nevertheless prevailed. In about 1317 Mary's special status lapsed but the king and the pope secured its renewal for her.

From the outset, Mary had been amply provided for. She was the object of personal endowments with lands, which were on various occasions increased. Her parents granted her £100 per year for life and she also received double the usual allowance for clothing and a special entitlement to wine from the stores. Additionally, there were in any case gifts of fuel and wine specifically for her. Her father visited her and Eleanor at the priory repeatedly: twice in 1286 and in 1289, and again in 1290 and three times in 1291. These visits, though less frequent as the years went by, nevertheless continued even after the death of Edward's mother Queen Eleanor in 1291. Edward was at Amesbury in 1297, 1302 and in 1305, his last visit, when he was accompanied by his Queen and a large retinue.

Mary's life as a nun of Amesbury, rather than exemplifying the dedication and earnestness of a Benedictine nun, resembled more the trivialities of the court and included absences for travel outside the enclosure. She was known to administer her various landholdings in person, travelling between them, and when resident lived in comfort in private quarters. Mary's mother, Eleanor of Castile, had died in 1290 and her father had remarried. In 1305 she was included in the entourage of the new Queen, her stepmother the young Margaret of France, who being born c. 1279 was close to her own age. In fact, Mary is reported to have visited court on various occasions and to have run up large gambling debts there at dice. That same year 1305 she was given £200 to pay these off.

None of this was the behaviour of a run-of-the-mill nun. Yet though there had been friction with the Abbess of Fontevraud, Mary continued to live comfortably. As to her later frivolities, it is recorded that in 1316 she was able to borrow more than £2 from abbey funds and sent a clerk to London on personal errands, at the priory's expense.

Because of her high status, several nobles who had decided their daughters would become nuns, entrusted them to Mary's custody. In this the royal family had probably given an example. Mary's half-sister, Eleanor of England (born 4 May 1306), her father's daughter by his second wife, Margaret of France, died in 1311 when still only five at Amesbury Abbey, though she was buried not there but at Beaulieu Abbey, a male Cistercian monastery in Hampshire,

Having never been (and therefore having doubtless never wanted to be) prioress of Amesbury, Mary died on 29 May 1332 and was probably buried in Amesbury.

After her death, John de Warenne, 7th Earl of Surrey, who was then attempting to divorce Mary's niece Joan of Bar, claimed to have had an affair with Mary before he married Joan (they married on 25 May 1306). Had John's claim been true, his marriage to Mary's niece would have been rendered null and void, but despite papal mandates for inquests to be made into the matter, the truth was never established.

=== Queen Eleanor ===
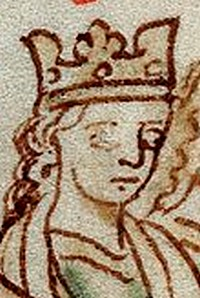
Queen Eleanor

Eleanor of Provence, the widow of Henry III of England, took the decision to retire to Amesbury Priory, just as Henry II's widow, Eleanor of Aquitaine, had taken up residence at the mother abbey, Fontevraud, in its early years. While for some years she had been a visitor and patron to Amesbury, obtaining also various favourable measures for it from the King, with Eleanor of Provence's arrival at Amesbury in June 1286 it was inevitable that her permanent presence would further radically change the nature and status of the house.

For one thing, coupled with the entry there of his daughter Princess Mary of Woodstock, some months earlier, it meant once again visits to the priory by the King, Edward I, who first went to Amesbury in 1275. Now he came to visit his mother, his daughter Mary and his niece Eleanor of Brittany on several further occasions: in March 1281, January and March 1286, October and November 1289, April 1290, February 1291 and again for her burial in September 1291. The visits of a King brought their own variety of disruption.

For another thing, since it is recorded that the Princess Mary lived in comfort in private quarters, it is hardly thinkable that Queen Eleanor, although a nun, would have less, and perhaps likewise other women of rank living in the house at various periods. In this way, it was unavoidable that the concentration of the priory on prayer and spirituality should suffer, and perhaps its corporate finances. On the other hand, the presence of members of the royal family undoubtedly would have kept the house from oblivion and given a measure of protection, though only at times.

Queen Eleanor died at Amesbury on 24 or 25 June 1291 and on 11 September following was solemnly entombed there before the high altar of the priory church in the presence of her son the King, Edward I, and many prelates and nobles. Her heart was taken to London and buried at Greyfriars, Newgate, London. The exact location of the tomb at Amesbury has been lost and the buildings of Greyfriars, London were destroyed in the Great Fire of London in 1666.

=== Prioress Isabel of Lancaster ===
From 1343 to her death some time before February 1349, the Prioress of Amesbury was Isabel of Lancaster, born possibly around 1305 or 1307. With 35 other nuns she had been consecrated a virgin by John Droxford, Bishop of Bath and Wells at Amesbury on Ascension Day 1327. One of the other women with her that day had been another future prioress, Isabel's successor, Margery of Purbrook.

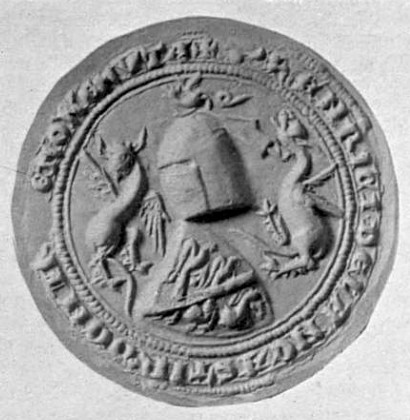
Seal of Isabel's father, Henry of Lancaster, 1301

Isabel was a daughter of Henry, 3rd Earl of Lancaster and Maud Chaworth, a lineage which made her a great-granddaughter of King Henry III. At a very young age she had been placed under the protection of Mary of Woodstock (1279–1332), daughter of Edward I and Eleanor of Castile, who was a nun of Amesbury. In the spring of 1317, Isabel went with Mary and her niece and protégée Elizabeth de Clare on a pilgrimage to Canterbury. This episode is revealing of aspects of the situation at Amesbury Priory at the time. Mary was then a woman of 38, while Isabel must only have been a very young girl at the time, barely in her teens, but was already living at Amesbury. Elizabeth, born on 16 September 1295, at 22 years old, would have been considerably senior to Isabel but was already twice widowed and had a child by each of her late husbands. She was to marry and be widowed for a third time and was of one of the richest and most influential women of the fourteenth century. On the death from typhoid of her second husband, Theobald II de Verdun, on 27 July 1316, his widow Elizabeth fled, pregnant, to the protection of her aunt Mary at Amesbury Priory. The child, Isabel de Verdun, had been born on 21 March 1317, so the pilgrimage might have been undertaken to give thanks for the safe birth.

Isabel had an only brother, Henry of Grosmont, 1st Duke of Lancaster, and five sisters, including the formidable Maud of Lancaster, Countess of Ulster, who after the murder of her first husband, William de Burgh, 3rd Earl of Ulster, had lived for a time at the court of King Edward III with the royal family. In 1347, the by then twice-widowed Maud also entered a nunnery, in her case Campsey Priory, a house of Augustinian canonesses near Wickham Market in Suffolk, but in 1364 she transferred to the Poor Clares community at Bruisyard Abbey, where she died and was buried in 1377.

Styled regularly in various contemporary documents as the "King’s cousin" or the "King’s kinswoman", Isabel was able to use her family connections to obtain privileges and concessions for the priory. In 1340 the King, Edward III, granted her three tuns of wine annually for life and in 1345 twelve oaks yearly from the royal forest of Chute.

Isabel became Prioress in 1343, the year after the death of Eleanor of Brittany, abbess of Fontevraud. Like Eleanor and Mary of Woodstock, Isabel seems to have had little genuine vocation to be a nun. She owned four hunting dogs, for example, gave and received expensive gifts, and had personal servants. Her father Henry had settled some property on her, which she administered personally. As did Abbess Eleanor, Isabel spent a great deal of time outside the cloister, on decidedly non-spiritual matters. Whether and in what manner her activities and those of other resident royal ladies were a financial burden on the monastery may have been to some degree invisible to the formal accounts, but the priory's spending on the keep of the nuns was higher than average among English nunneries. Moreover, considerable sums of money were paid annually to the priory's senior lay administrators, even for servants for them. This is perhaps an indicator of the readiness to facilitate the existence of ladies who wielded considerable power.

=== Prioress Sybil Montagu ===
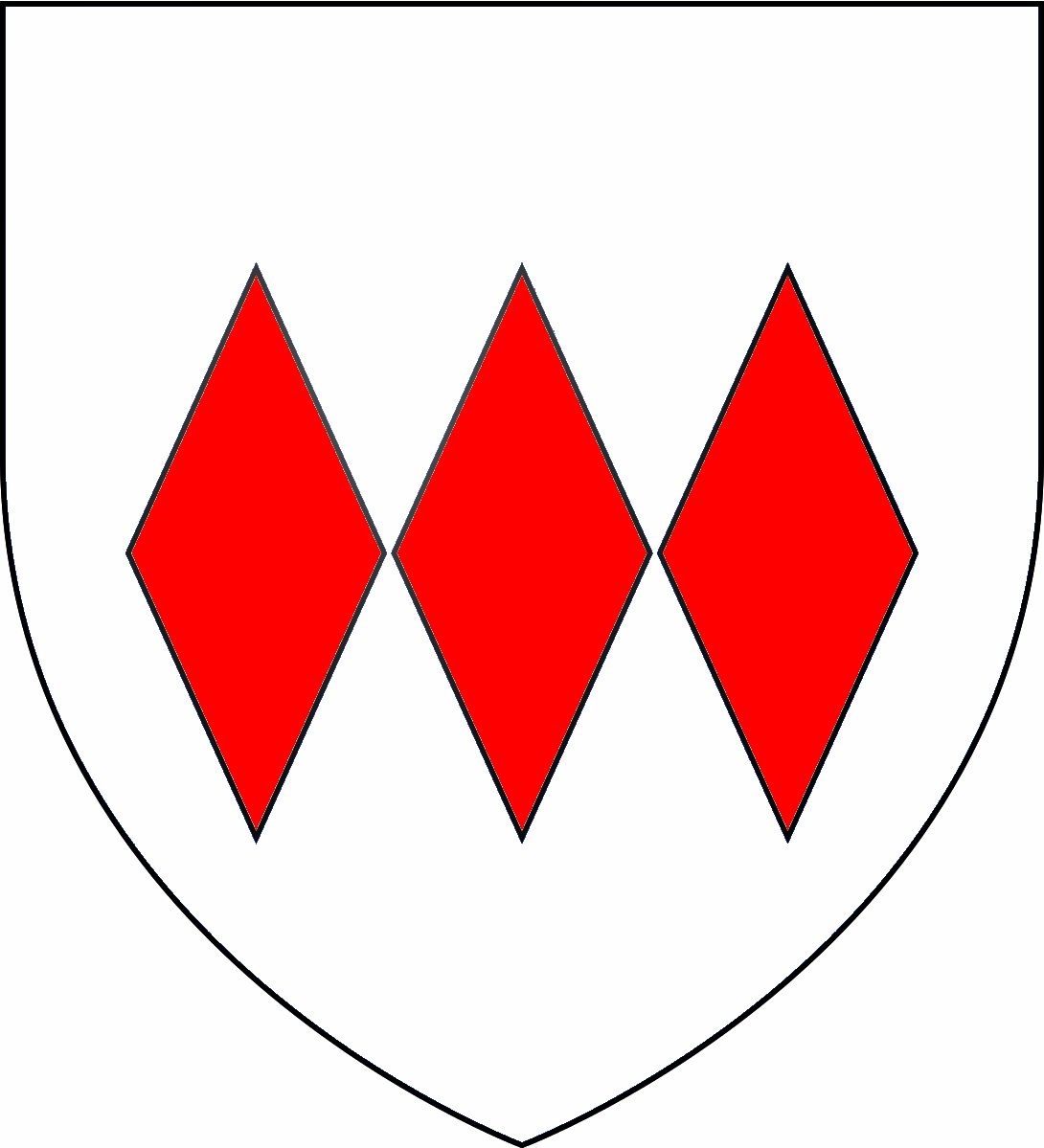
Arms of Montagu

Not half a century after Isabel of Lancaster, the prioress was Sybil Montagu, a woman not of the same rank, but still well-placed by birth as a niece of William Montagu, 2nd Earl of Salisbury, and sister of John Montagu, 3rd Earl of Salisbury, and of Thomas Montagu, who was Dean of Salisbury from 1382. While the date of her entry as a nun is not recorded, Sybil became prioress around 1391. On her watch not all was well, for in 1398 a nun, Margaret Greenfield, gave birth to a child. Perhaps unrelated to this, that same year Sybil had the elderly Prior Robert Daubeneye thrown out of the monastery. The mixed royal and ecclesiastical enquiries into the resulting uproar compromised by saving the reputation of the Prior and ordering the granting of a pension, but not reinstating him in the house. On 14 March 1400 the monastery was invaded after nightfall by ruffians who imprisoned Sybil and some of the nuns for at least two days; it took the involvement of Henry IV and his orders to officers of the crown to free them and restore order. In 1415 there was another episode where Dame Sybil claimed to have been ejected from the monastery and to be afraid to enter it again, and this time it was Henry V who intervened. Dame Sybil kept her post until her death in 1420.

== Another royal burial ==
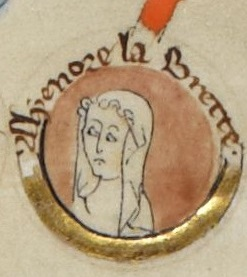
Eleanor, Fair Maid of Brittany

Eleanor of Brittany, known as the Fair Maid of Brittany (died 1241), was the eldest daughter of Duke Geoffrey II of Brittany, the fourth son of King Henry II of England, and hence was the latter's granddaughter. Having lost her father at the age of two, she and was brought up by her uncle Richard I, King of England and grandmother Eleanor, Duchess of Aquitaine. With the presumed death in 1203 of her brother, Arthur, she became heiress to vast lands including England, Anjou, and Aquitaine as well as Brittany. In none of them did the Salic Law barring the accession of females apply. Given that she was heir to her father, who was Henry II's fourth son, while John, King of England, was only Henry's fifth son, she posed a strong threat to the claims of her uncle, and of his successor, her cousin, Henry III. The brutal solution was to keep her a prisoner for the rest of her days, and so she was gently detained in various locations in England from 1202 until her death in 1241. Having been initially buried at St James' Priory, Bristol, she was then reburied only a month or so later at Amesbury Abbey, which Henry III announced was her chosen resting place. Neither burial place has a memorial for her remains. Henry also granted the priory the rich manor of Melksham in suffrage for her soul and that of her brother Arthur (who was widely believed to have been murdered by King John of England) in 1268, ordering both to be mourned along with kings and queens; and eventually for the souls of his own and that of his queen.

== The Priory Seal ==
The seal of the Priory at some periods at least seems to have depicted the Coronation of the Virgin Mary, which is not a particularly common motif in medieval English nunneries.

In other seals of the Priory, as for example one datable to 1337–1345, the image depicted is of the prioress standing.

== Dissolution ==
In the early months of 1539 John Tregonwell, William Petre, and John Smyth visited over 40 houses on behalf of the government to solicit their surrender. On 29 March 1539 they reached Amesbury Priory, after two other nunneries, Shaftesbury Abbey and Wilton Abbey, in both of which the abbess had declined initially to surrender. At Amesbury, too, they failed to persuade Dame Florence Bonnewe to surrender. On 30 March 1539 the three signed a letter to Thomas Cromwell reporting "we have used as many wayes with her as o[ur] pore witte cowed atteyne yet in theende we cowed not by any p[er]suasions bringe her to any conformitye but at all tymes she rested and soo remayneth in theis termes: yf the kinge’s highness commande me to goo from thys howse I will gladlye goo though I begge my breade". She refused talk of a pension and only asked to be left in peace. In August other commissioners tried and succeeded, persuading Dame Florence to resign her office "at the king’s bidding".

On 4 December her successor, Joan Darrell, surrendered the priory without resistance. It has been noted that there is a difficulty in knowing whether Dame Florence had been prioress continuously since or before the date when her name is first mentioned as such in 1523 and whether and when Joan Darrell had already served as prioress. The facts are that Florence Bonnewe appears as prioress in 1523, 1524, 1527, 1535 and 1539 but Joan Darrell as prioress in 1536, 1537, 1538 and 1539.

The annual gross income of the monastery in 1535 was £558 10s. 2d, net £482 1s. 10d. This made it the fifth wealthiest among nunneries in England. Its net value at the surrender was £525 9s. 3 1/2d, equivalent to £413,978 in 2025.

A patent of 4 February 1540 granted a total of £258 6s. 8d. in pensions to Prioress Darrell (£100) and to 33 nuns (an average of a little less than £5 each), of these 21 nuns were still receiving pensions in 1555–1556, with Cecily Eyre still a beneficiary as late as 1605. Dame Florence Bonnewe had asked for a pension "during the litle tyme that it shall pleas God to graunte me to lyve" but what the amount was (or if there was any grant at all) is not known. Four priests are mentioned as receiving a payment of some kind, possible back wages.

== The property ==
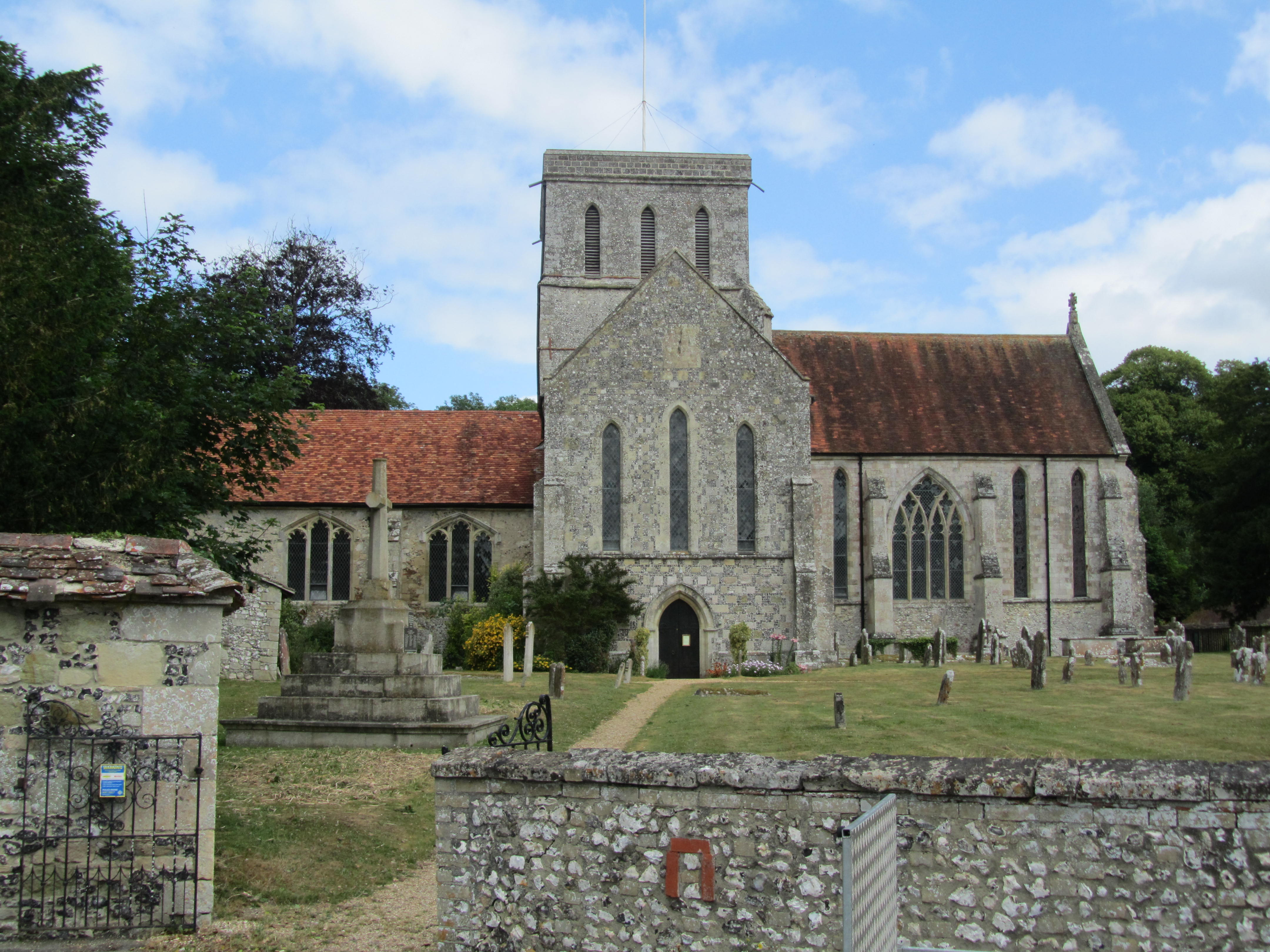
The Church of St Mary and St Melor, Amesbury

Some think that Amesbury's parish church, the Church of St Mary and St Melor, is the former priory church or perhaps the men's church, but this is debated. The present church has a 12th-century nave and is a Grade I listed building.

The Amesbury Priory buildings were subsequently obtained from the Crown before 22 April 1540 by Edward Seymour, 1st Earl of Hertford, a nephew to Jane Seymour, Queen consort of Henry VIII, and the eldest son of her brother, Edward Seymour, 1st Duke of Somerset, Lord Protector of England during the minority of King Edward VI, the Earl's cousin, with whom he had been educated in infancy.

== Literary allusions ==
Sir Thomas Malory’s long romance Le Morte d'Arthur reworked old folk tales of the legendary King Arthur, Guinevere, Lancelot, Merlin, and the Knights of the Round Table, drawing on existing French and English stories. Malory (c. 1415–1471) was familiar with the Fontevraud daughter house of Nuneaton Priory, and given the royal connections of its sister house at Amesbury he chose Amesbury as the monastery to which Guinevere retires as "abbas and rular", to find her salvation in a life of penance. The work was first printed in 1485 by William Caxton.

== Current interest ==
In addition to the Priory's importance among English monastic houses and a revival of focus on its parent Order of Fontevraud, Amesbury's structure of women governing men has attracted interest in the present day.

== See also ==
- List of monasteries dissolved by Henry VIII of England

== Notes ==
- Chettle, H. F. (1942). "The English Houses of the Order of Fontevraud". Downside Review. 60: 33–55. doi:10.1177/001258064206000103. S2CID 188238011.
- Auch (1913). Histoire de l'Ordre de Fontevrault (1100–1908). Vol. II.
