= Amesbury Abbey =

Benedictine abbey in Wiltshire, England

Coordinates: 51.1719°N 1.7843°W

Amesbury Abbey was a Benedictine abbey of women at Amesbury in Wiltshire, England, founded by Queen Ælfthryth in about the year 979 on what may have been the site of an earlier monastery. The abbey was dissolved in 1177 by Henry II, who founded in its place a house of the Order of Fontevraud, known as Amesbury Priory.

The name Amesbury Abbey is now used by a nearby Grade I listed country house built in the 1830s, currently a nursing home.

== History ==
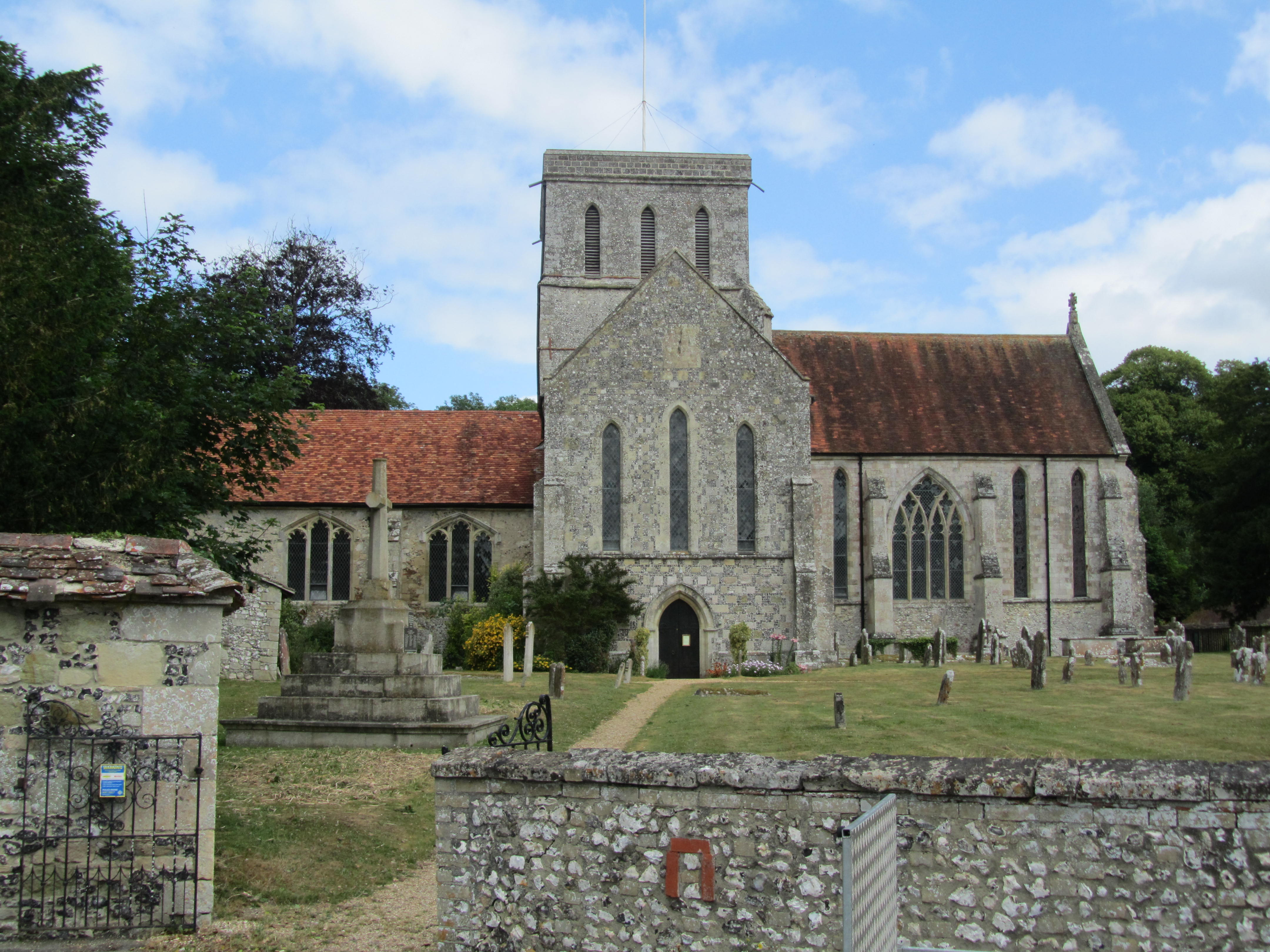
Church of St Mary and St Melor, Amesbury

Amesbury was already a sacred place in pagan times, and there are legends that a monastery existed there before the Danish invasions. There may have been an existing cult of St Melor which led Ælfthryth to choose Amesbury. Melor, the son of a leader of Cornouaille and a boy-martyr, was buried at Lanmeur and venerated in Brittany, but a later tradition claims that some of his relics were brought to Amesbury and sold to the abbess. However, the 12th-century life of St Melor says the nunnery at Amesbury was founded before Melor's relics arrived. The cult of St Melor is commemorated in the dedication of the current Amesbury parish church.

=== Saxon abbey ===
The monastery was founded by Queen Ælfthryth in about the year 979 on what may have been the site of an earlier monastery. She founded two religious houses at about the same time, the other being at Wherwell in Hampshire. Ælfthryth's motive was long believed to be contrition for the murder of Edward, another boy-martyr, making the date of 979 given by the Melrose chronicle appropriate. However, she is now considered not to have been personally responsible for the murder.

At the time of the Domesday Book (1086), the abbey held, as it had had in King Edward's time, the Wiltshire manors of Bulford, Boscombe, Allington, Coulston, and Maddington, totalling twenty-seven hides, together with the manor of Rabson in Winterbourne Bassett. In Berkshire it held Ceveslane in Challow, Fawley, and Kintbury and the church at Letcombe Regis.

It seems that for most of its existence Amesbury Abbey was probably not of particular importance and its overall income was not especially high. It was, like all women's houses in particular, liable to harassment, rustling and other incursions by powerful neighbours, as well as abusive tax exactions. At the £54 and 15 shillings that its income reached, it was admittedly just above Wherwell Abbey (Hampshire) and Chatteris Abbey (Cambridgeshire), but it was less than other nunneries in its region, such as Wilton Abbey (Wiltshire), Shaftesbury Abbey (Dorset) or Romsey Abbey (Hampshire).

As to the Abbesses of Amesbury, the references are sparse. For the period before the Conquest there is only a retrospective mention much later of Heahpled (?), in the years 979 and 1013, and at the time of the house's re-foundation, of the then incumbent Abbess, Beatrice (1177).

=== New foundation ===
In 1177 Ælfthryth's foundation was dissolved by Henry II and reconstituted as a house of the Order of Fontevraud, a Benedictine reform.

Pope Alexander III issued a bull on 15 September 1176 approving the plan but specifying that the Archbishop of Canterbury and the bishops of London, Exeter and Worcester were to visit the convent and notify the nuns of the need to cooperate. Any nun who declined to join the new Order was to be transferred to another monastery and treated well. The new regime was then to be introduced, and when the commission of bishops decided the moment had come, the abbess and a party of nuns from Fontevraud Abbey were to come to complete the handover.

Things did not go quite as smoothly as this formula suggested, though the accounts may display a natural bias against the existing community. In the event, it was said that scandal was discovered when the bishops of Exeter and Worcester made their inspection in the octave of the feast of St Hilary, 1177. The abbess was deposed and dismissed with a pension. Some of the other nuns were compromised and unrepentant and these were also expelled. Those willing to make amends received the offer to stay on; it seems that there were some 30 nuns and they were all expelled.

The party that Henry II then summoned from Fontevraud were in the end some 21 or 24 nuns, led not by the Abbess of Fontevraud but by a former subprioress. Some nuns were also brought from Westwood Priory in Worcestershire, also a Fontevraud house. The new community was solemnly installed on 22 May in the King's presence by the Archbishop of Canterbury, accompanied by several other bishops.

=== Order of Fontevraud ===
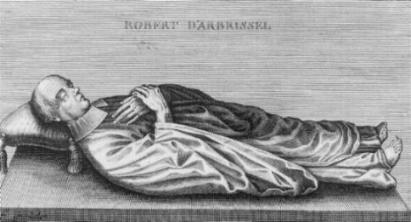
Engraving of Robert of Arbrissel effigy (now lost) at Fontevraud

The Plantagenets were great benefactors of the mother abbey at Fontevraud in its early years, and Henry II's widow, Eleanor of Aquitaine, went to live there. That monastery, founded in 1101, became the chosen mausoleum of the Angevin dynasty and the centre of a new monastic order, the Order of Fontevraud.

The Fontevraud monastic reform followed in part the lead of the highly influential and prestigious Cluny Abbey in adopting a centralized form of government, whereby in a federated structure the superiors of subsidiary houses were in effect deputies of the Abbot of Cluny, the head of the Order, and their houses were hence usually styled priories, not abbeys, governed therefore not by abbots but by priors. In the analogous case of the Order of Fontevraud, its head was the Abbess of Fontevraud, who at the death of the Order's founder, Robert of Arbrissel, in about 1117, already had under her rule 35 priories, and by the end of that century about 100, in France, Spain and England.

Fontevraud also took up a feature that had appeared sporadically in early centuries, whereby its houses were double monasteries, with separately housed convents of both men and women, under a common superior, which in the case of the Order of Fontevraud was a prioress. The men had their own male superior, but he was subject to the prioress. At Amesbury and in some other places this model seems to have broken down, and by the beginning of the 15th century Amesbury seems to have become an exclusively women's house, with a small group of priest-chaplains external to the Order.

=== Amesbury Priory ===
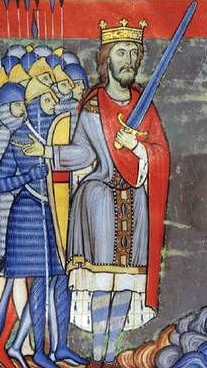
Henry II, founder of the Priory

Though it was above all Henry II who over his long reign (1154–1189) introduced the Order of Fontevraud into England, there seem only ever to have been in the country four houses in all. Apart from Amesbury, these were Westwood Priory (Worcestershire), Eaton or Nuneaton Priory (Warwickshire) and Grovebury Priory (Bedfordshire), the latter three founded roughly between 1133 and 1164, so before Henry revamped the foundation at Amesbury about 1177.

Although the later Amesbury monastery is popularly referred to as an "abbey", it was not one. The first monastery appears to have been truly an abbey, but the Fontevraud daughter house was always a priory. Perhaps the fading memory of historical fact after the English Reformation, the end of links with Rome, and later the inroads of Romanticism, explain the use of the word. The choice of the name for the later country house may also have been a factor.

==== Some women of Amesbury Priory ====
Eleanor of Brittany (died 1241), a princess held captive for most of her life for her presumable claim to the English throne, donated her body and was buried here, and in 1268 King Henry III would grant to the abbey a manor of Melksham in suffrage for her soul and that of her brother Arthur, who was widely believed to have been murdered by Henry III's father King John; Henry III would also order the abbey to have Eleanor and Arthur commemorated as well as the late English kings and queens.

Eleanor of Provence, Queen consort of Henry III of England, died in Amesbury on 24 or 25 June 1291, and was buried in the abbey on 11 September 1291.

From about at least 1343 to her death some time before February 1349, Isabel of Lancaster was Prioress of Amesbury. She was the sister of Henry of Grosmont, 1st Duke of Lancaster, a great-grandson of Henry III. She was also younger sister of the formidable Maud of Lancaster, Countess of Ulster. In 1347, the twice-widowed Maud also entered a nunnery, in her case Campsey Priory, a house of Augustinian canonesses near Wickham Market in Suffolk, but in 1364 she transferred to the Poor Clares community at Bruisyard Abbey, also in Suffolk, where she died and was buried in 1377.

Not half a century later, the prioress was Sybil Montague, a woman well-placed as a niece of William Montague, 2nd Earl of Salisbury (d.1389) and sister of John Montague, 3rd Earl of Salisbury. Her election as prioress in 1391 was confirmed by the King, Richard II. Dame Sybil seems in effect to have abolished the system of male priors, though this caused a great upheaval and involved the intervention of the new King, Henry IV, against the background of his seizure of power from Richard II. Dame Sybil seems to have navigated the rapids and remained prioress, dying in 1420.

=== Dissolution ===
It is possible that Amesbury parish church, the Church of St Mary and St Melor, is the former priory church, and this may explain why it was spared at the time of the Dissolution of the Monasteries, though the priory and its other buildings were destroyed. The church is a Grade I listed building.

The Amesbury estate was subsequently obtained from the Crown by Edward Seymour, 1st Earl of Hertford, a nephew to Jane Seymour, Queen consort of Henry VIII, and the eldest son of her brother, Edward Seymour, 1st Duke of Somerset, Lord Protector of England during the minority of King Edward VI, the Earl's cousin, with whom he had been educated in infancy.

== 19th-century house ==
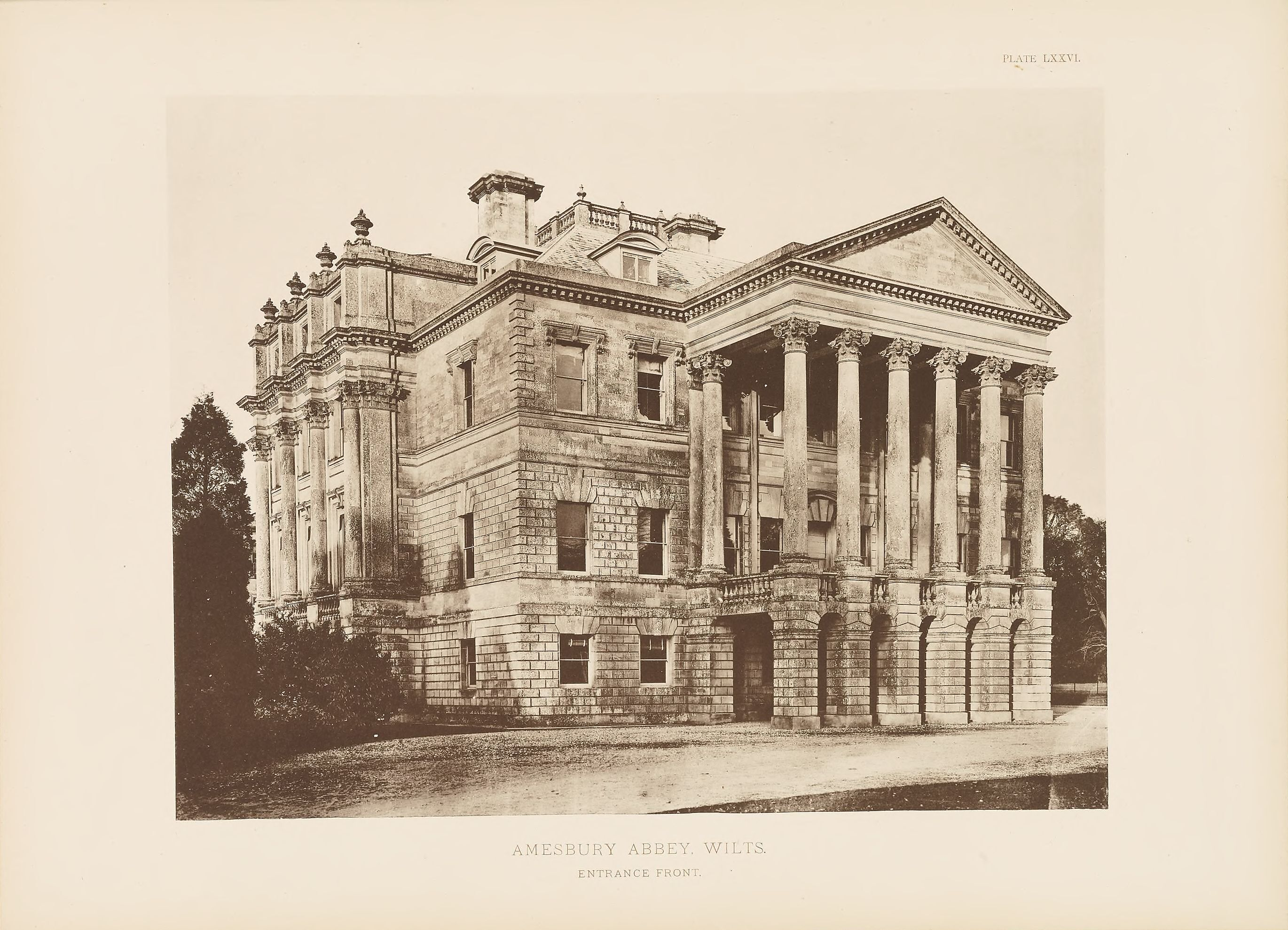
South elevation, Amesbury Abbey, c. 1900

The nearby country house, also called Amesbury Abbey, was not part of the nunnery: it was built in 1834–1840 by architect Thomas Hopper for Sir Edmund Antrobus. It has three storeys and attics, and replaced a previous house built in 1660–1661 by John Webb for William Seymour, 2nd Duke of Somerset. The main south front has nine bays, of which five sit behind a portico of six composite columns.

The house was designated as Grade I listed in 1953, and is now used as a care home. It stands in pleasure grounds and parkland, in all about 140 acres (56 ha), which are listed Grade II* on the Register of Historic Parks and Gardens of special historic interest.
