= Amesbury =

Town in Wiltshire, England

Coordinates: 51.173°N 1.780°W

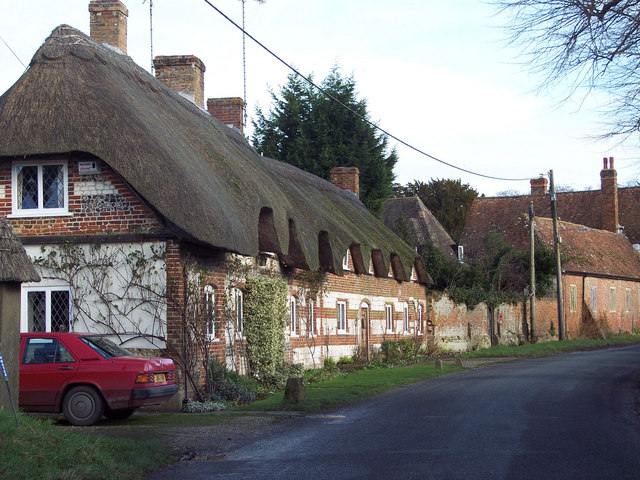
- Cottages in Amesbury

- Location within Wiltshire
- Population: 12,995 (2021 census)
- OS grid reference: SU1642
- Civil parish: Amesbury
- Unitary authority: Wiltshire
- Ceremonial county: Wiltshire
- Region: South West
- Country: England
- Sovereign state: United Kingdom
- Post town: Salisbury
- Postcode district: SP4
- Dialling code: 01980
- Police: Wiltshire
- Fire: Dorset and Wiltshire
- Ambulance: South Western
- UK Parliament: East Wiltshire
- Website: Town Council

Amesbury (/ˈeɪmzbəri/) is a town and civil parish in Wiltshire, England. It is known for the prehistoric monument of Stonehenge which is within the parish. The town is claimed to be the oldest occupied settlement in Great Britain, having been first settled around 8820 BC. The parish includes the hamlets of Ratfyn and West Amesbury, and part of Boscombe Down military airfield.

== Etymology ==
The derivation of the name of the town is uncertain. It may derive from an Anglo-Saxon named Ambre, or from the Old English amore-burh meaning 'fortification frequented by buntings or/and yellowhammers'. It has also been suggested that the name is derived from Ambrosius Aurelianus, leader of Romano-British resistance to Saxon invasions in the 5th century.

== Geography ==
Amesbury is located in southern Wiltshire, 7 miles (11 km) north-northeast of Salisbury on the A345. It sits in the River Avon valley on the southern fringes of Salisbury Plain and has historically been considered an important river crossing area on the road from London to Warminster and Exeter. This has continued into the present with the building of the A303 road across the Avon next to the town. Originally the town developed around the water meadows next to several bends in the river, but in time has spread onto the valley hillsides and absorbed part of the military airfield at Boscombe Down.

=== Climate ===
Climate data for Boscombe Down, 126m amsl (WMO identifier: 03746) 1991–2020 normals, extremes 1957-
Month	Jan	Feb	Mar	Apr	May	Jun	Jul	Aug	Sep	Oct	Nov	Dec	Year
Record high °C (°F)	15.0 (59.0)	17.5 (63.5)	21.3 (70.3)	25.8 (78.4)	31.9 (89.4)	36.0 (96.8)	34.9 (94.8)	34.2 (93.6)	30.0 (86.0)	26.2 (79.2)	17.6 (63.7)	14.6 (58.3)	36.0 (96.8)
Mean daily maximum °C (°F)	7.6 (45.7)	8.1 (46.6)	10.7 (51.3)	13.7 (56.7)	17.0 (62.6)	19.8 (67.6)	22.1 (71.8)	21.6 (70.9)	18.9 (66.0)	14.7 (58.5)	10.6 (51.1)	8.0 (46.4)	14.4 (57.9)
Daily mean °C (°F)	4.6 (40.3)	4.8 (40.6)	6.8 (44.2)	9.1 (48.4)	12.2 (54.0)	15.0 (59.0)	17.1 (62.8)	16.9 (62.4)	14.5 (58.1)	11.1 (52.0)	7.4 (45.3)	5.0 (41.0)	10.4 (50.7)
Mean daily minimum °C (°F)	1.6 (34.9)	1.6 (34.9)	2.9 (37.2)	4.5 (40.1)	7.5 (45.5)	10.2 (50.4)	12.1 (53.8)	12.2 (54.0)	10.1 (50.2)	7.5 (45.5)	4.2 (39.6)	2.0 (35.6)	6.4 (43.5)
Record low °C (°F)	−12.4 (9.7)	−10.0 (14.0)	−9.6 (14.7)	−4.7 (23.5)	−2.4 (27.7)	−0.1 (31.8)	4.4 (39.9)	3.6 (38.5)	−0.1 (31.8)	−3.4 (25.9)	−7.2 (19.0)	−11.3 (11.7)	−12.4 (9.7)
Average precipitation mm (inches)	79.5 (3.13)	57.3 (2.26)	53.8 (2.12)	55.0 (2.17)	49.9 (1.96)	53.7 (2.11)	55.1 (2.17)	59.1 (2.33)	57.8 (2.28)	85.7 (3.37)	90.9 (3.58)	85.2 (3.35)	783.0 (30.83)
Average precipitation days (≥ 1.0 mm)	12.5	10.5	9.7	9.5	9.0	8.8	8.6	9.6	9.0	12.3	12.8	12.6	125.0
Mean monthly sunshine hours	62.1	79.4	124.4	178.9	211.8	216.1	223.5	199.4	155.9	112.9	75.0	59.9	1,699.2
Source 1: Met Office
Source 2: Starlings Roost Weather

== History ==
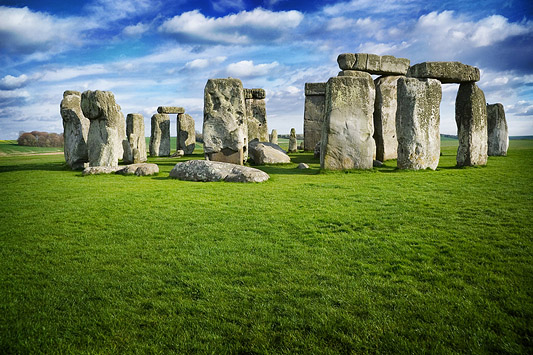
Stonehenge

=== Ancient and medieval ===
The land around Amesbury has been settled since prehistoric times, evidenced by the monument of Stonehenge. In 2014, archaeologists from the University of Buckingham found Amesbury had been continually occupied since 8,820 BC, causing The Guardian to write that Amesbury was "in effect where British history began".

Other finds in the parish point to large-scale prehistoric structures and settlements in the area, including Bluestonehenge at West Amesbury, the numerous other monuments around Stonehenge, and the discovery of a Neolithic village in the neighbouring parish of Durrington by the Stonehenge Riverside Project. Excavations in 2002 and 2003 at Boscombe Down by Wessex Archaeology found the Amesbury Archer and Boscombe Bowmen.

During the Iron Age, a large hill fort now known as Vespasian's Camp was built alongside the Stonehenge Avenue and overlooking the River Avon. The fort could have catered for up to 1,000 people, and was probably surrounded by smaller settlements and farming communities.

Roman remains are poorly documented at Amesbury, but excavations have revealed Roman structures in the Stonehenge landscape, and Wessex Archaeology found a large Roman graveyard in the area of the Amesbury Archer burial. It is likely that there was a large Romano-British settlement overlooking the River Avon at this point.

It is possible that an order of monks established a monastery in the area, that was destroyed by the Saxons before they settled the area in the 7th century.

King Alfred the Great left Amesbury in his will, a copy of which is in the British Library, to his youngest son Aethelweard (c. 880–922). In 1086, Domesday Book recorded a settlement named Amblesberie or Ambresberie with 111 households and eight mills. The largest estate was held by Wilton Abbey, and other land was held by Edward of Salisbury.

In 979 AD, a Benedictine abbey, the Abbey of St Mary and St Melor, was founded on what may have been the site of a previous monastery, by Dowager Queen Ælfthryth. In 1177 the abbey was dissolved by Henry II and replaced with Amesbury Priory, with nuns and monks of the Fontevraud order. Henry III visited the priory several times, and his widow Eleanor of Provence retired there in 1286, leading to visits by her son, Edward I; his daughter Mary of Woodstock and niece Eleanor of Brittany had already entered the convent when young. The priory continued until the dissolution of the monasteries in 1540, after which its buildings – including the church with its lead-covered spire – were demolished.

Amesbury is also associated with the Arthurian legend: the convent to which Guinevere retired was said to have been the one at Amesbury. This legend has its origins in the world of Middle English Arthurian romance: the Stanzaic Morte Arthur (c. 1350–1400) is the earliest text to claim that Guinevere retired to Amesbury, rather than to Caerleon, as had previously been claimed by the historian Geoffrey of Monmouth. The claim was repeated in Sir Thomas Malory's Le Morte d'Arthur. In 1542, the antiquarian John Leland took things further, stating that Guinevere had actually been buried at Amesbury before being disinterred and translated to Glastonbury Abbey to lie beside her husband, King Arthur. The tradition of Guinevere's Amesbury burial came to a head in the early 1600s, when an ancient noblewoman's grave was discovered during renovation work at the old Abbey site, then in the hands of the Earls of Hertford. Inigo Jones, the lead architect, was convinced that the grave was Guinevere's, and in the decades after the discovery visitors flocked to Amesbury to see the grave for themselves, where a plaque had apparently been erected to mark the location.

=== Modern history ===
On John Speed's map of Wiltshire (1611), the town's name is spelt both Amesbury (for the hundred) and Ambersbury (for the town itself).

After the dissolution, Amesbury became a secular estate and was given to Edward Seymour, 1st Earl of Hertford by the Crown; the Seymour family held the estate until 1675. A new mansion which took the name Amesbury Abbey was completed in 1661, designed for William Seymour, 2nd Duke of Somerset (d. 1660) by John Webb in neo-classical style.

The estate subsequently passed to the Bruce family, and then to Lord Carleton, who bequeathed it to his nephew Charles Douglas, 3rd Duke of Queensberry. The grounds feature a Chinese summerhouse commissioned by the Duke from Sir William Chambers. The estate remained in the Queensberry family until 1824. It is believed that at some point in the early 19th century, William Douglas, 4th Duke of Queensberry planted the Nile Clumps to commemorate Admiral Nelson, and had the hillfort landscaped as part of the grounds around the mansion.

In 1824, Sir Edmund Antrobus acquired the estate and, finding the mansion in poor repair, had it rebuilt in 1834–1840 to designs of Thomas Hopper. In 1915, Lord Antrobus sold the grounds – including Stonehenge – to private bidders, although the mansion remained in Antrobus family hands until 1979. The house is now operated as a nursing home.

In 1677, John Rose, gentleman, founded two schools at Amesbury, a grammar school for teaching grammar, writing, and ciphering to twenty children born in the parish, and an "English school" to prepare twenty children of poor parents for the grammar school. By a decree in Chancery of 1831, the freedom of the grammar school was extended to children of "mechanics, artisans, and small tradesmen". The grammar school was closed in 1899, and the children were transferred to a National School.

=== Recent history ===
With the establishment of the military Aeroplane and Armament Experimental Establishment at Boscombe Down in 1939, Amesbury began to expand. As it lies within the A303 commuter belt, Amesbury has seen substantial developments on the land between the old town centre and Boscombe Down. Several new housing estates have been completed, and the most recent one – Archers Gate – has taken its name from the discovery of the Amesbury Archer. At the Boscombe Down junction of the A303, a mixed business development known as Solstice Park has been built.

On 30 June 2018, two British nationals were poisoned using Novichok nerve agents before being found unconscious at a property in Amesbury; one of them, Dawn Sturgess, later died. Almost four months earlier, the same nerve agents were used in the poisoning of Sergei and Yulia Skripal in nearby Salisbury. The Amesbury property was later demolished.

== Population ==
At the 2011 census, the population of the civil parish was 10,724. For the Amesbury Community Area the mid-2011 population was estimated to be 33,660 (this is a wide area stretching to Tilshead, Larkhill and Figheldean in the north; Cholderton in the east; the Winterbournes, the Woodfords and Great Wishford in the south; and Wylye in the west).

== Governance ==
The civil parish elects a town council. The parish is in the area of Wiltshire Council, a unitary authority which is responsible for all significant local government functions. For Westminster elections, it is part of the East Wiltshire constituency.

== Transport ==
Amesbury is 6 miles (10 km) from Grateley railway station on the London to Salisbury line. The town's own station, Amesbury railway station, was closed in 1963 along with the rest of the Bulford Camp Railway.

Amesbury Bus Station closed in January 2014 along with the bus station in nearby Salisbury as a cost-cutting measure, but Salisbury Reds services still stop in the town. Stagecoach and Salisbury Reds jointly operate a frequent Salisbury-Amesbury-Tidworth-Andover service, and National Express provide a service to London. Salisbury Reds also operate the X4 Salisbury-Amesbury-Larkhill and the X5 Salisbury-Amesbury-Swindon.

== Local media ==
Local TV coverage is provided by BBC West and ITV West Country via the Mendip transmitter; BBC South and ITV Meridian can also be received from either Hannington transmitter or Rowridge transmitter. The town's local radio stations are BBC Radio Wiltshire and Greatest Hits Radio Salisbury, as well as British Forces Broadcasting Service, a radio service for military personnel. The local newspapers that cover the town are the Salisbury Journal and Avon Advertiser.

== Religious sites ==
The church of St Mary and St Melor, the town's parish church, is grade I listed. Its nave is from the early 12th century and much of the rest is 13th-century. The large size of the building may reflect Amesbury's early royal connections, or a link to Amesbury Abbey; it is thought that the abbey had its own church until its dissolution in the 16th century, but no evidence of that church survives above ground.

Amesbury Methodist Church was built in 1900, replacing an 1816 chapel. Christ the King Catholic church opened in 1985, replacing a 1933 building on a different site. Amesbury Baptist Church was built in 1997.

== Notable buildings ==
The mansion known as Amesbury Abbey, standing in parkland close to the site of the former abbey, is grade I listed. It was built in 1834–1840 by architect Thomas Hopper for Sir Edmund Antrobus, and replaced a similar house built in 1661 by John Webb for the 2nd Duke of Somerset. Features in the grounds include an ornamental bridge rebuilt in 1755. The house is now operated as a nursing home. Diana's House and Kent House are flint and stone gatehouses to the property from the early 17th century; both are grade II* listed and are irregular in plan with a high stair-tower, leading Pevsner to call them "curious".

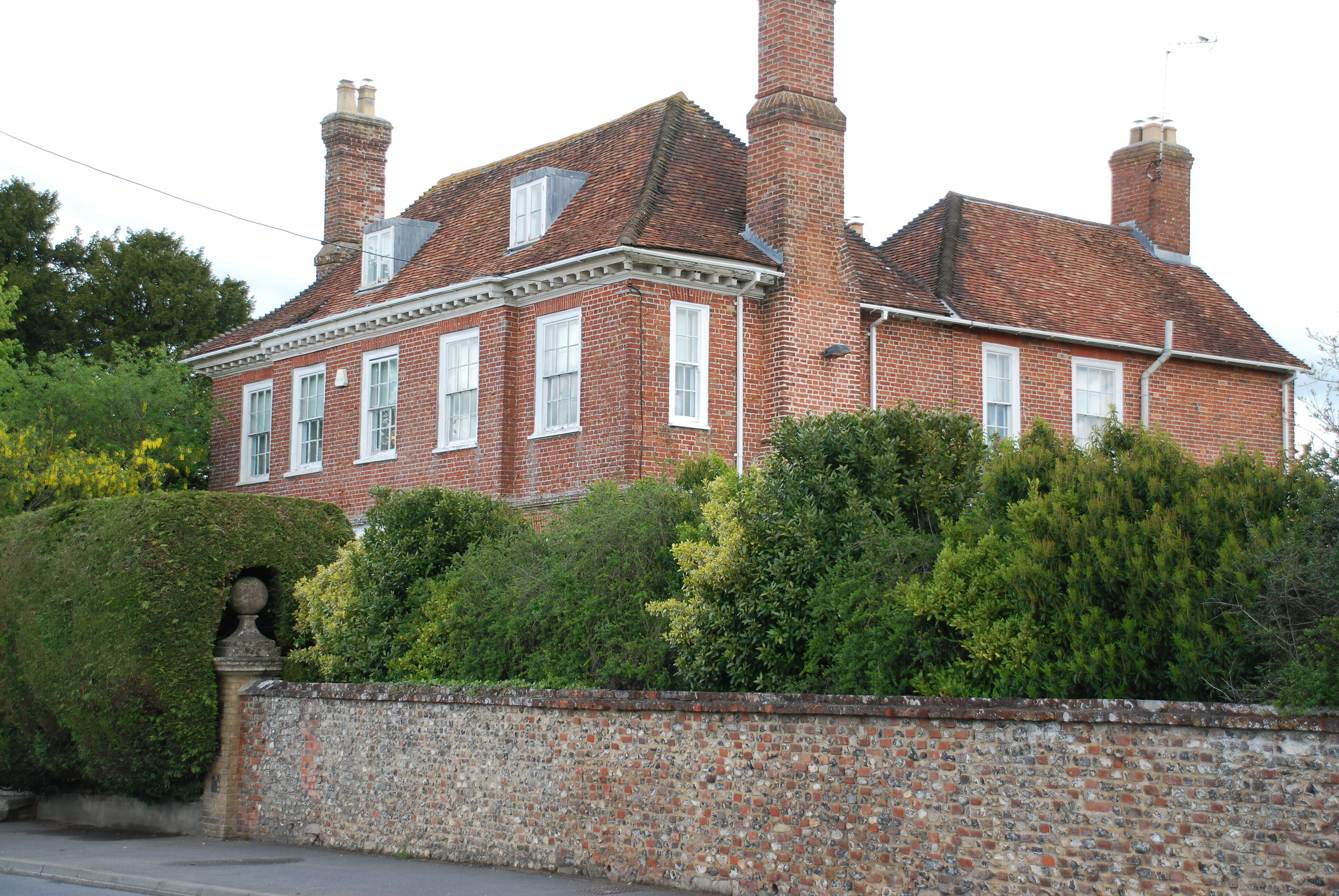
The Red House

The Red House on Salisbury Road is a five-bay former farmhouse, rebuilt in red brick c.1700 and described by Pevsner as "the best older house ... with a pretty early-19th-century cast-iron porch". This is the former home of Francis Stephen Long, Esquire, whose wife, Ann, remained at the Red House until her death in 1856. Nearby on Salisbury Road, Antrobus House was built in 1924–5 under a bequest of Lady Florence Antrobus (1856–1923) as a memorial to her son Edmund, who died at war in Belgium in 1914. Although intended as a village hall, Historic England state it is "built to a high standard". In handmade brick, the tall five-bay central block contains the hall and has substantial wings on both sides. The low roadside wall in flint and stone has an overall length of 43m and a central iron gate set back from the road; the tall brick gate piers have stone vases.

West Amesbury House is from the 15th century and is grade I listed; in flint and stone chequer, it was remodelled in the early 20th century by Detmar Blow.

== Education ==
Amesbury has a secondary school – The Stonehenge School – and four primary schools:

- Amesbury Archer Primary School
- Amesbury Church of England Voluntary Controlled Primary School
- Christ The King Catholic Primary School
- King's Gate Primary School

== Amenities ==
The town centre has a hotel and restaurant, the Antrobus Arms (18th century and early 19th), and four pubs: The George Hotel (originally c. 1560 with later alterations), The Kings Arms (mid 18th century), The New Inn (early 19th) and The Bell (1908).

Antrobus House is a venue for community organisations, weddings and other events.

Amesbury has a Non-League football club, Amesbury Town F.C., which plays at Bonnymead Park. Amesbury Bowls Club have their green and clubhouse at Antrobus House.

Amesbury History Centre

Amesbury History Centre is the town museum. It was rebuilt in 2023.

== In popular culture ==
Although Stonehenge falls within the parish of Amesbury, the town does not directly benefit from the monument's fame. However, Amesbury has appeared in the public eye on its own merits in the past.

In 2002, the discovery of the richest Bronze Age burial site yet found in Britain was made at Amesbury. The remains of two men of apparently aristocratic rank were accompanied by over 100 objects including arrowheads, copper knives and the earliest worked gold in the country. The occupant of the more richly furnished grave has become known as the "Amesbury Archer".

The town is linked to the Arthurian legend as it is popularly believed that Guinevere retired to the original convent at Amesbury after leaving Arthur. Legend holds that she is buried in the grounds of the former Abbey.

From 3–5 May 1965, The Beatles stayed at The Antrobus Hotel during the filming of Help! on Salisbury Plain. The Antrobus Hotel and the former Plaza Cinema were both used as locations for the filming of a BBC Miss Marple mystery.

The Salisbury Poisonings, a three-part dramatisation of the 2018 poisonings in Salisbury and Amesbury, was broadcast on BBC One in June 2020.

== See also ==
- William Carpenter (Rhode Island colonist) – an Amesbury resident who settled in America in the 1630s.

== Bibliography ==
- Bateman, Mary (2022). "A Grave Discovery? Guinevere's Death and Burial at Amesbury in Medieval and Early Modern Tradition". In Coldham-Fussell, Victoria; Edlich-Muth, Miriam; Ward, Renée (eds.). The Arthurian World. London: Routledge. pp. 413–28.
- Chandler, John; Goodhugh, Peter (1979). Amesbury: history and description of a south Wiltshire town. Amesbury: Amesbury Society. ISBN 9780950664309 – via Internet Archive.
- Crowley, D. A.; Pugh and Stevenson (2003) A History of Amesbury, Bulford and Durrington. ISBN 0-86080-444-5
- Baggs, A. P.; Freeman, Jane; Stevenson, Janet H. (1995). "Parishes: Amesbury". In Crowley, D. A. (ed.). A History of the County of Wiltshire, Volume 15. Victoria County History. University of London. pp. 13–55 – via British History Online.
