= Grovebury Priory =

Benedictine priory in Bedfordshire, England

Coordinates: 51.90377°N 0.65982°W

Location
- Country: England
- Interactive map of Grovebury Priory

Architecture
- Established: 1164

Grovebury Priory, also known as La Grave or Grava, was a priory in Leighton Buzzard, Bedfordshire, England. It was established in 1164 and disestablished in 1414.

== Origins ==
The beginnings of the Priory lie with a grant of the royal manor of Leighton made by Henry II to the abbess and convent of Fontevraud in 1164. It is probable that a house was built there for a cell of the Order not very long after.

Hence Leighton manor was initially the sum total of the original endowment of the house. To this later there was added land belonging to Walter Pullan, worth 32 shillings. Some smaller gifts of land in Edlesborough and Stewkley, Buckinghamshire and in Studham. The value of the manor in Leighton in 1291 was £32, 6 shillings 8 pence; and other temporalities of the priory in the deanery of Dunstable amounted to £2, 2 shillings 2 pence. In 1302 the abbess of Fontevraud held one Knight's fee in Stewkley; in 1316 the manor of Leighton, and half a fee in Studham; in 1346 only half a fee in Stewkley.

== Order of Fontevrault ==
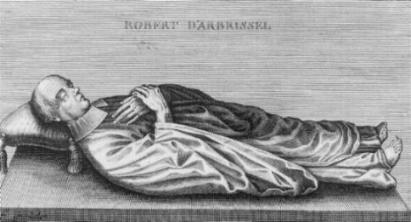
Robert of Arbrissel in the now lost effigy

It is known that the Plantagenets were great benefactors of the mother abbey at Fontevraud in its early years and Henry's widow, Eleanor of Aquitaine, took up residence there. That monastery, founded in 1101, became the chosen mausoleum of the Angevin dynasty. More dynamically, it became the centre of a new monastic Order, the Order of Fontevrault.

The Fontevraud monastic reform had two notable distinguishing features. Firstly, it followed in part the model established by the highly influential and prestigious Cluny Abbey (which by the 12th century numbered more than a thousand monasteries.) in adopting a centralized form of government. While most Benedictine monasteries remained autonomous and associated with each other only loosely, Cluny created a federated structure in which the superiors of subsidiary houses effectively were deputies of the Abbot of Cluny, the head of the Order. These subsidiary houses were hence usually styled priories, not abbeys, governed therefore not by abbots but by priors, or more technically obedientiary priors. The head of the Order of Fontevraud was the Abbess of Fontevraud. At the death about 1117 of the founder, Robert of Arbrissel, she already had under her rule 35 priories, and by the end of that century about 100, in France, Spain and England.

The second characteristic feature was that its houses were double monasteries, with separately housed convents of both men and women, under a common superior, a prioress. The men had their own male superior, but he was subject to the prioress.

The prime mover in introducing the Order of Fontevraud into England was above all Henry II, over the course of his long reign (1133-1189). However, there seem only ever to have been in the country four houses in all. Apart from Grovebury, these were firstly Westwood Priory (Worcestershire), and Eaton or Nuneaton Priory (Warwickshire), and Grovebury Priory (Bedfordshire), the two being, with Grovebury, founded roughly between 1133 and 1164. Later Henry II revamped and refounded the monastery at Amesbury (1177), a more complex venture. Amesbury became the principal Fontevraud house in England and apparently even the residence of the abbess of Fontevraud for a period during the abbacy of Joan de Dreux (1265-1276). It was also the residence not only of Eleanor of Provence (died 1291), the widow of Henry III of England, but also of other women of rank, such as Eleanor of Brittany (1275-1342), later abbess of Fontevraud; Mary of Woodstock (1279-1332), daughter of Edward I; and prioresses Isabel of Lancaster (c. 1305- before February 1349), daughter of Henry, 3rd Earl of Lancaster and a great-granddaughter of King Henry III; and Sybil Montagu (died 1420), sister of John Montagu, Earl of Salisbury. It was also the chosen burial place of Eleanor of Brittany, known as the Fair Maid of Brittany (died 1241), who was the rightful heir to the thrones of England and Brittany.

With the passing of the Plantagenet dynasty, Fontevrault and her dependencies began to fall upon hard times, and the decline was worsened by the devastation of the 14th century Hundred Years War. In 1460 a canonical visitation of fifty of the priories of the Order revealed most of them to be barely occupied, if not abandoned.

== The Situation at Grovebury ==
Grovebury seems never to have been a true house on the elaborate Fontevraud double monastery model, but largely a land holding administered by a small number of male religious. This format was known among other "priories" classed by the English crown as alien priories and explains why, unlike the other Fontevraud houses in England, Grovebury was classed as such. An altogether banal but instructive example would be Blakenham Priory in Suffolk (a possession of the great Benedictine abbey of Bec in Normandy), where it is doubtful that true conventual monastic buildings ever existed, at least of any size.

At La Grava there is never talk of a prioress. A prior is first mentioned in 1195–1196, and at that time he is referred to as the Prior of Leighton, even the name of La Grave or La Grava not appearing till late in the reign of Henry III.

This prior of Leighton had a good deal of trouble with his tenants on the subject of feudal services during the thirteenth century, which involved him in suits before the Curia Regis from 1213 to 1290.

The nature of the enterprise at this house is shown from the fact that the Prior during the latter part of the century was William de Lyencourt. This was a person of some importance, since he doubled as the proctor general of the abbess of Fontevraud in England, and in that capacity was obliged to make journeys for which he had to seek safe conducts from the king.

Both the mother house at Fontevraud and the priory of Almesbury in England, where the king's mother resided at the end of her life and where his daughter had made their profession, were in great poverty at this time. It was said that at Fontevraud, at one time they had only the blackest of bread to eat on Fridays, For whatever reason, there is no mention made of poverty at La Grave.

The history of the house is in general is a little difficult to trace. Even the dedication of the church is unknown and other than William de Lyencourt, mentioned explicitly as prior in 1283, 1287, 1297, only a single prior's name is known, that of one Nicholas, who occurs in 1258 and 1263.

Such difficulties are especially true of the fourteenth century. In 1316 the manor was stated to be the property of the abbess of Fontevraud, but "now in the hand of the Princess Mary," and in 1349 the pope wrote to Edward III, asking him to allow the abbess and convent to regain possession of the house of La Grave, of which they had been despoiled. It seems however to have returned to its original position as a cell of Fontevraud, for it was reckoned in the next century among the alien priories, and in consequence of the measures introduced by 1414 was seized and granted in 1438, along with many other properties, to Eton College; and a few years later, in 1481, transferred to the dean and canons of St. George's Chapel, Windsor Castle.

== Site ==
The site of Grovebury Priory, more correctly 'La Grava', was comprehensively excavated by the Bedfordshire County Archaeology Service between 1973 and 1985, in advance of destruction by a 60-ft deep sand quarry. An account of that project and its discoveries, largely dependent upon the unemployment training schemes provided by the Manpower Services Commission in the 1970s and 1980s, has been published in 2011 as a chapter (14 'The Manpower Services Commission and La Grava' by Evelyn Baker) in 'Great Excavations - Shaping the Archaeological Profession' edited by John Schofield (Oxbow). The full excavation report was published by the Council for British Archaeology in October 2013 as Research Report 167, an English Heritage supported monograph, entitled 'La Grava, the Archaeology and History of a Royal Manor and Alien Priory of Fontevrault' by Evelyn Baker with contributors.

== See also ==
- List of monastic houses in Bedfordshire

== Notes ==
- This article incorporates text from a publication now in the public domain: The Priory of La Grave or Grovebury, in The Victoria History of the County of Bedford: Volume 1, 1904
- wikimapia
