= Theodore Searle =

British tramp, poet and musician

Theodore Racine Searle
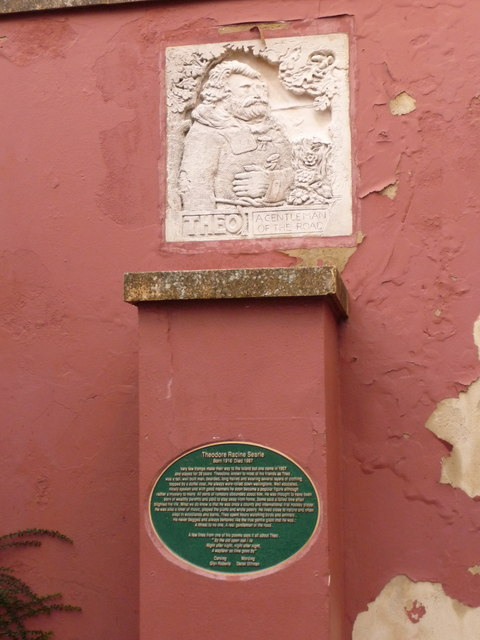
- The memorial to Theodore Searle in Ryde, erected 2009.
- Born: July 21, 1916; Newport, Monmouthshire
- Died: Bridport, Dorset
- Other names: The Gentleman of the Road, Theo the Tramp
- Known for: Piano, poems, being a tramp
- Parents: Reverend Gustavus Searle (father); Edith Searle (née Waterworth) (mother)

Theodore Racine Searle (also known as The Gentleman of the Road or Theo the Tramp, 21 July 1916 – January 1987) was a tramp, poet and musician on the Isle of Wight, notably in the towns of Ryde and Cowes in the 1960s and 1970s. In October 2009, after his death, a stone carving and plaque was erected in his memory in Ryde.

== Life ==
He was born on 21 July 1916, the second child to Edith (née Waterworth) and Reverend Gustavus Searle in Newport, Monmouthshire. His parents probably moved there between his older brother, Gustavus's birth in Amesbury, Wiltshire in 1912 and his birth. His parents got married in Kingston-upon-Thames. In 1920, his younger sister, Joan was born in Colchester. His father may have travelled to Hong Kong, Mauritius and other places in Africa. He attended a public school in Cheltenham.

He was known for entering pubs in Ryde and playing the piano to entertain the customers.

His death was in 1987 in Bridport, Dorset.

== Memorial ==
In a small square in Ryde, there is a stone craving and plaque dedicated to him, erected in October 2009. It says:

Very few tramps make their way to the Island, but one came in 1957 and stayed for 28 years. Theodore, known to most of his friends as Theo, was a tall, well built man, bearded, long haired, and wearing several layers of clothing topped by a duffel coat. He always wore rolled down wellingtons. Well educated, nicely spoken and with good manners, he soon became a popular figure although rather a mystery to many. All sorts of rumours abounded about him. He was thought to have been born of wealthy parents and paid to away from home. Some say a failed love affair blighted his life. What do we know that he was once a county and international trail hockey player. He was also a lover of music, played the piano and wrote poetry. He lived close to nature slept in woodlands and barns. Theo spent hours watching birds and animals. He never begged and always behaved like the true gentle giant that he was. A threat to no one. A real gentleman of the road.

A few lines from one of his poems says it all about Theo "By the old open oak I lie Night after night, night after night, A wayfarer as time goes by."

Carving: Glyn Roberts

Wording: Derek Stirman
