= Sybil Montagu, Prioress of Amesbury =

Dame Sybil Montagu
- Born: 1368
- Died: 1420 (aged 51–52); Amesbury Priory
- Parent(s): John de Montagu, 1st Baron Montagu and Margaret de Monthermer
- Relatives: William de Montagu, 2nd Earl of Salisbury (uncle); John Montagu, 3rd Earl of Salisbury, Thomas Montague, Dean of Salisbury (brothers)
- Religion: Catholic
- Offices held: Prioress of Amesbury 1391-1420

Sybil Montagu or Montague or de Montague or Montacute was a daughter of John de Montagu, 1st Baron Montagu and his wife Margaret de Monthermer. At an unknown date she entered Amesbury Priory and became a nun, then in 1391 was elected the monastery's prioress. Her vigorous government led to a few stormy years in the monastery, in the period when the conflict between Richard II and his eventual successor Henry IV came to a head. She weathered that and later storms and died as prioress in 1420.

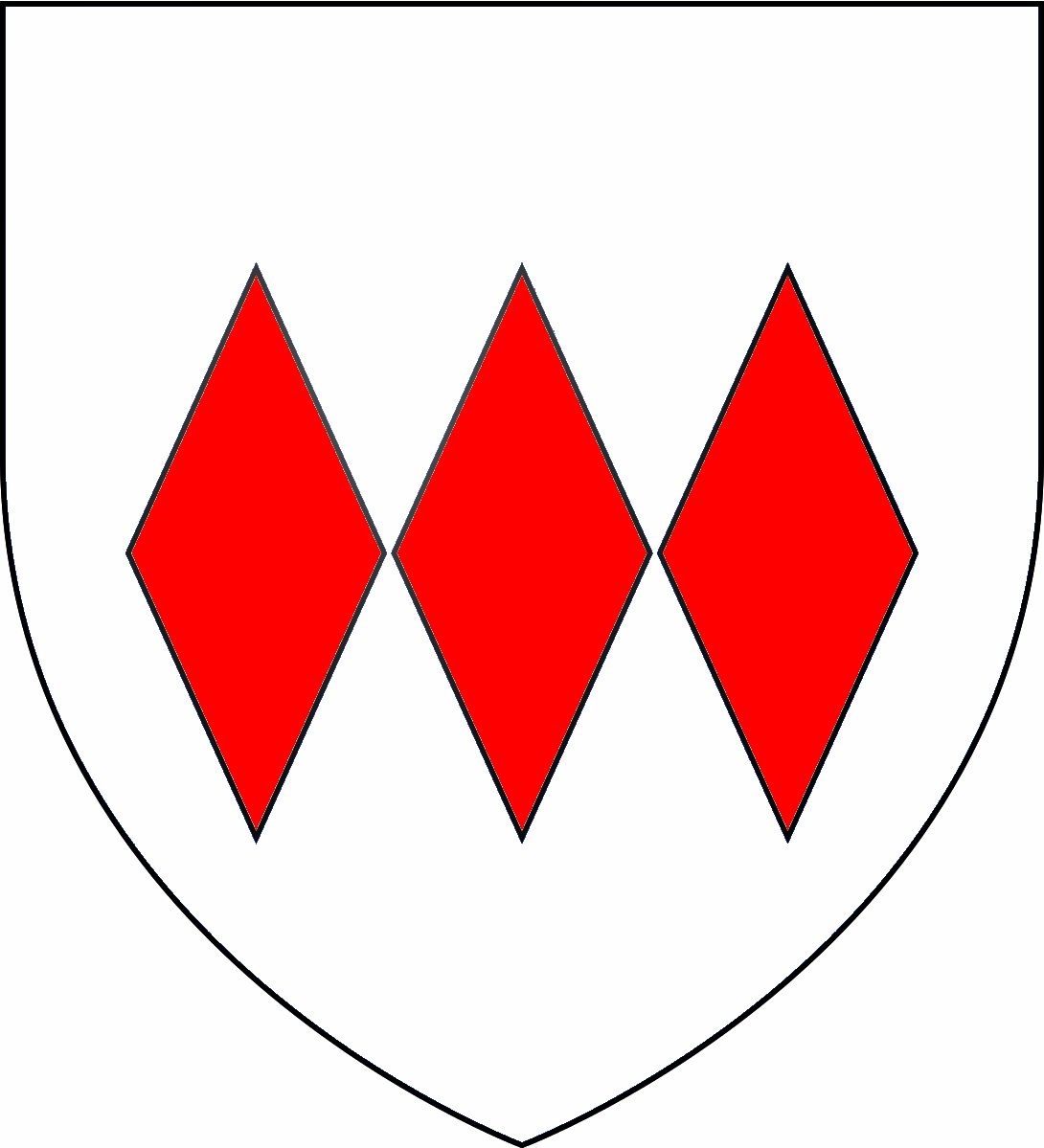
Arms of Sybil's father, John de Montagu, 1st Baron Montagu: Argent, three fusils conjoined in fess gules

== Early life ==
Sybil Montagu was born about 1368. She was the daughter of John de Montagu, 1st Baron Montagu and his wife Margaret de Monthermer. Her uncle, her father's brother, was William Montague, 2nd Earl of Salisbury (died 1389). She was the sister of John Montague, 3rd Earl of Salisbury, and of Thomas Montague, a priest and graduate of Oxford University, who from 1382 was Dean of Salisbury (died in 1404).

== Sybil the nun ==
At a date now unknown, Sybil became a professed nun of Amesbury Priory, a house of the Order of Fontesvraud. It is recorded that in 1391 her election as prioress was confirmed by the King, then Richard II.

A 1341 letter of the king to Amesbury Priory during the Hundred Years' War disputed some of the rights of the abbess and restricted others. In the light of this, when the prioress died about 1349 the nuns took a cautious approach and sought the king's licence to elect. This created a precedent for the future that was followed in 1391, as it had been also in 1379.

How long Sybil had been a nun before she was elected prioress is difficult to calculate. Some women of rank who became nuns had such status that they were elected when the earliest vacancy came about, but that might happen at greatly varying intervals.

== A wayward sibling ==
Sybil's sister Katherine was also a nun, though of a rather turbulent kind, and in a different monastic house. Katherine had entered Bungay Priory in Suffolk, but at some point in 1376 or 1377 she absconded and was said to be "vagabond in secular attire in divers parts of the realm". While not the norm, absconding was not totally unknown for medieval English nuns.

Katherine's flight become the subject of a denunciation by the local bishop, the Bishop of Norwich, Henry le Despenser and of a consequent order from King Henry II for her capture and forcible return to her monastery.

== A complicated role ==
Running a monastery in medieval England brought administrative and economic responsibilities that were joined to spiritual duties. As a woman, Sybil would not be summoned to Parliament as many of the male monastic superiors were. However, as prioress she was under the authority of at least four powerful figures: the pope, the king, the diocesan bishop and the abbess of Fontevraud. The latter, though resident on the Continent, had an agent resident in England, termed a procurator or proctor general, who at times travelled extensively across the country attending to the affairs of the Order.

Moreover, in theory the houses of the Order of Fontevraud were unlike many monastic communities in so far as in principle they had side by side a female house and a male house, all under the authority of the local prioress. The historical records regarding Amesbury Priory speak in the 14th century of a male house of 12 priests referred to as 'canons' (i.e. canons regular). As to the female house, we learn that in 1317–1318, it contained no less than 117 nuns (perhaps including small numbers of lay sisters), though 36 new nuns were consecrated in 1327. These numbers were much reduced in 1381, with only 28 nuns, besides the prioress. At the time of the Dissolution of the monasteries and the Priory's closure in 1539, there seem only to have been the prioress and 33 nuns.

== Storms ==
As the 14th century closed, Dame Sybil became embroiled in some notable events. Firstly, in May 1398, some seven years after her election as prioress, an inquiry was ordered by the King into the government of the priory with a view to reforming it according to the ordinances and constitutions. Among other indications of indiscipline was the birth of a child in 1398 to a nun of Amesbury, Margaret Greenfield. Before January 1399, Dame Sybil showed a decisive temperament by having the elderly Prior Robert Daubeneye thrown out of the monastery. In the uproar of accusations and counter-accusations that followed, she emerges as high-handed and the mixed royal and ecclesiastical enquiries were favourable to the Prior and his reputation as a priest in good standing, though he was not reinstated but was ordered to receive a pension.

However, on 14 March 1400 there was a sequel when ruffians invaded the monastery after nightfall and Sybil and some of the nuns were imprisoned for at least two days, the prioress was manhandled and perhaps the monastery's treasure was carried off. Upon her prompt complaint, Henry IV, crowned king on 13 October 1399, issued orders to officers of the crown to free the nuns and restore order, since "evildoers of the town have taken and imprisoned" them.

The official investigations brought to light an attempt of Dame Sybil to pare down the number of canons from twelve to four, replacing them with secular priests. This was a delicate moment since in 1388 Richard II, to whom Sybil's male relatives were steadfastly loyal, had been deposed by Henry IV. Her brother John had been heavily caught up in resistance to the new king, was imprisoned by a mob at Cirencester, and without trial beheaded on 7 January 1400, three months before the irruption at Amesbury.

There were difficulties for the so-called alien priories, that is, those monastic houses, usually small, that were dependencies of foreign, usually French, mother houses. Communication with the mother house was often impossible and impolitic, and as a result, discipline at the English dependencies suffered. In 1378, all the monks in alien priories had been expelled from England and finally in 1414, under Henry V, those that remained were suppressed.

The situation at Amesbury was not so drastic, partly because the house fell into a distinct subcategory of its kind since for a long time the head of the house, the prioress, had been elected by the nuns, by the king's leave and with his confirmation, rather than being appointed by the abbess of Fontevraud, their nominal monastic superior. It would seem, however, that Amesbury suffered the same systemic disciplinary problems as elsewhere.

Over a decade after the earlier storm, the prioress launched an appeal to the King, claiming she had been evicted from the house and was afraid to enter it again. On 7 February 1415, Henry V, in the presence of Henry Chichele, Archbishop of Canterbury, ordered that she receive "suitable sustenance for herself and her servants from the spiritual and temporal possessions belonging to the said priory of Amesbury" until a visitation of the house could be conducted by the Archbishop and the ills remedied. Again, Sybil kept her position as prioress.

== Final years ==
Though information on the outcome of various phases of these repeated investigations have not survived, she was to continue as prioress for many years, dying in 1420. At her death, it was Henry V who licensed the subprioress and nuns to proceed to the election of her successor.
