= The Stonehenge School =

Location
- Holders Road; Amesbury, Wiltshire, SP4 7PW; England; 51°10′29″N 1°46′15″W

Information
- Type: Community school
- Established: 1958
- Local authority: Wiltshire Council
- Department for Education URN: 126458 Tables
- Ofsted: Reports
- Headteacher: Carole Dean
- Gender: Coeducational
- Age: 11 to 16
- Enrolment: 969
- Website: www.stonehenge.wilts.sch.uk

The Stonehenge School is a mixed comprehensive school in Amesbury, Wiltshire, England for children aged 11 to 16. As of December 2022, the school had 940 places and 969 students were enrolled.

The school's logo is an image of Stonehenge. It is divided into a Lower school, Middle school and Upper school.

== History ==
The site where the school stands was bought in 1938 for a Church of England secondary school that was never built. In 1958 a secondary school opened on the site. In 1960–1961 the school was enlarged. In 1974 the school was renamed The Stonehenge School, taking pupils aged 11 to 16.

An Upper School building and sports hall were built alongside the existing building in the 1970s.
