= Mary of Woodstock =

English princess and nun (born 1278)

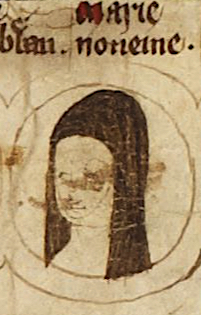
- Mary depicted on the family tree of the kings of England
- Born: 11 March 1279; Windsor Castle
- Died: before 8 July 1332; Amesbury Priory
- House: Plantagenet
- Father: Edward I of England
- Mother: Eleanor of Castile

Mary of Woodstock (11 March 1279 – before 8 July 1332) was the seventh named daughter of Edward I of England and Eleanor of Castile. She was a nun at Amesbury Priory, but lived very comfortably thanks to a generous allowance from her parents. Despite a papal travel prohibition in 1303, she travelled widely around the country.

== Early life ==
Mary's grandmother, Eleanor of Provence, had decided to retire to Amesbury Priory in Wiltshire, a daughter house of Fontevrault. She lobbied for Mary and another granddaughter, Eleanor of Brittany, to become Benedictine nuns at the priory. Despite resistance from Eleanor of Castile, Mary was dedicated at Amesbury in 1285, at the age of six, alongside thirteen daughters of nobles. She was not formally veiled as a nun until December 1291, when she had reached the age of twelve. Eleanor of Brittany had been veiled in March, while Eleanor of Provence did not take the veil until June 1286.

Mary's parents granted her £100 per year for life (approximately £117,000 in 2025); she also received double the usual allowance for clothing and a special entitlement to wine from the stores, and lived in comfort, in private quarters. Her father visited her and Eleanor at the priory repeatedly: twice in 1286 and in 1289, and again in 1290 and 1291. Eleanor of Provence died in 1291, and it was expected that Mary would move to Fontevrault. Certainly the prioress of Fontevrault wrote frequently to Edward I asking that his daughter be allowed to live there. Probably to prevent his daughter falling into French hands in the event of war with England, Edward refused, and Mary remained at Amesbury, while her allowance was doubled to £200 per year. In 1292, she was also given the right to forty oaks per year from royal forests and twenty tuns of wine per year from Southampton.

== Representative of the Order ==
Despite being a resident at the priory, Mary began to travel the country. She visited her brother Edward in 1293, and regularly attended court, spending five weeks there in 1297, in the run-up to her sister Elizabeth's departure to Holland. By the end of the century, she held the post of vicegerent and visitatrix for the abbess, with the right to authorise the transfer of nuns between convents. In 1302, her £200 per year was replaced by the rights to several manors and the borough of Wilton, all held on condition that she remain in England. However, she ran up considerable dice gambling debts while visiting her father's court, and in 1305 was given £200 to pay them off. She was also given Grovebury Priory in Bedfordshire to manage, holding this until her death.

Mary was unsuccessful in obtaining high office in the order, whereas Eleanor of Brittany became abbess at Fontevrault in 1304. The papal decretal Periculoso was read at Amesbury in 1303, requiring nuns to remain within their religious establishments, but Mary's travels do not appear to have been affected. She went on numerous pilgrimages, including one to Canterbury, and continued to visit court, with a retinue of up to twenty-four horses, sometimes with fellow nuns. Soon after 1313, her role as visitor was removed. In 1317, Mary's brother Edward, by now King Edward II, asked Eleanor to restore her to the post, but his request was refused. But Mary persevered and obtained a papal mandate requiring her reinstatement, which Eleanor appears to have obeyed.

== Later life ==
Despite her apparent conflict with Eleanor, Mary continued to live comfortably. In 1316, she was able to borrow more than £2 from abbey funds (approximately £1,200 in 2025), and sent a clerk to London on personal errands, at the priory's expense.

It was effectively as a princess, not a nun, that Mary received the homage of the English Dominican friar Nicholas Trevet, a prolific and versatile university scholar and author, who in 1328–1334 dedicated to her his Cronicles, which she may even have commissioned him to write. Intended as an amusing history of the world, it later became an important source for several popular works of the period. In part it is an account of Mary's own Plantagenet clan, and she herself is given a flattering mention there:

the fourth daughter was dame Mary of whom it ys before sayde that she wedded herself unto the hygh king heaven. And in so moche as hit ys trewly sayde of her and notably this worthy text of holy scripture: optimam partem elegit ipsi Maria, que non auferetur ab ea. The whych ys as moche to say "As Maria hathe chosyn the best party to her, the whych shall not be done away from her".

Here, Trevet quotes from Jesus' words in the Gospel of Luke (10:42), where Jesus good-humouredly defends Mary to her sister Martha. It is a somewhat daring use of the Gospel text, which was traditionally often applied to the Virgin Mary.

Likewise, because of Mary's status, several nobles who wished their daughters to take vows placed them into her custody.

Mary died before 8 July 1332, and was buried in Amesbury Priory. After her death, John de Warenne, 7th Earl of Surrey, attempting to divorce Mary's niece Joan, claimed to have had an affair with Mary before he married Joan. If John's claim was valid, his marriage to Mary's niece would have been rendered null and void, but despite papal mandates for inquests to be made into the matter, the truth was never established.
