= Church of St Mary and St Melor, Amesbury =

Coordinates: 51.1719°N 1.7843°W

St Mary and St Melor, Amesbury
- The Abbey Church of St Mary and St Melor
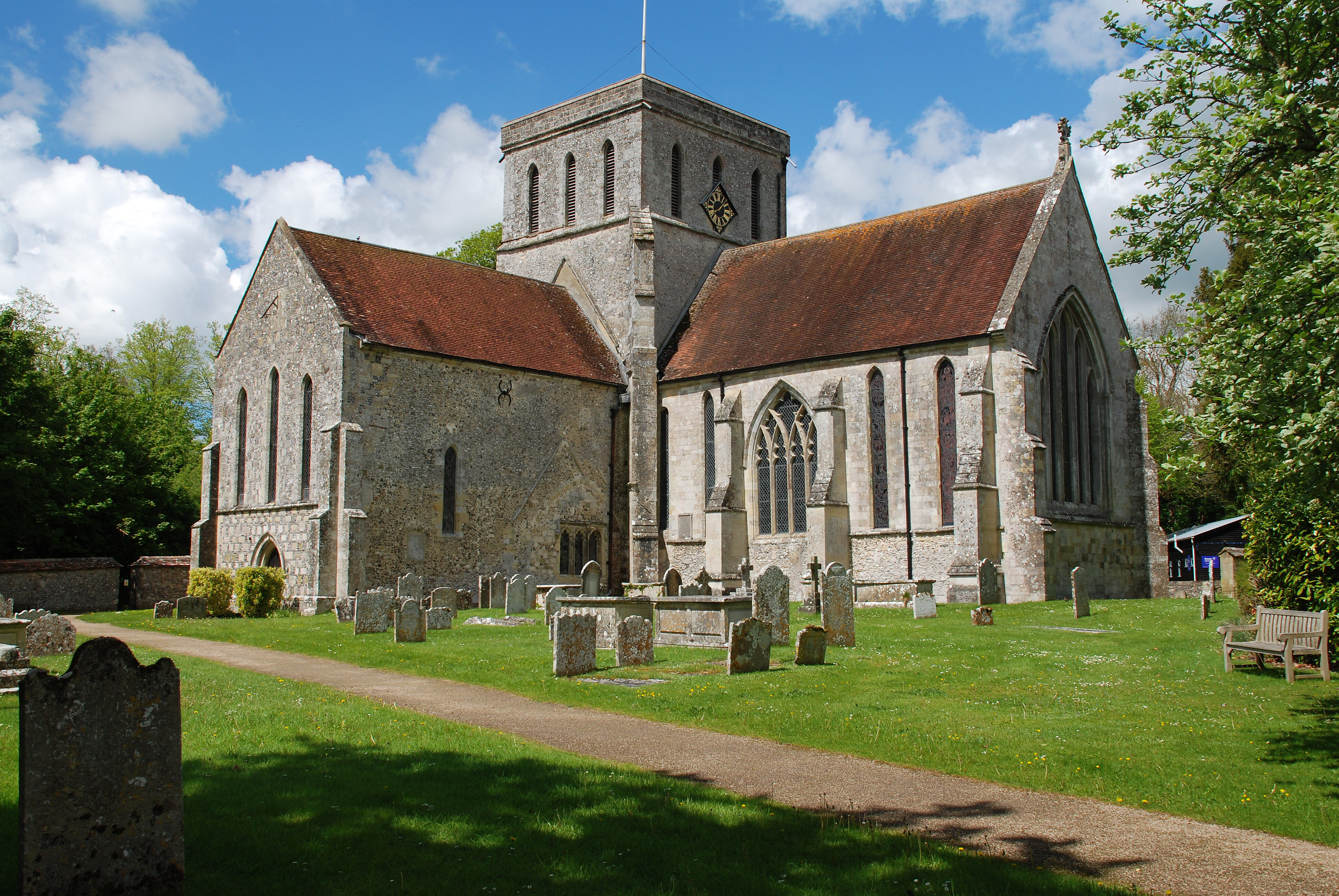

- Location in Wiltshire
- OS grid reference: SU 15176 41435
- Location: Church Street, Amesbury, Wiltshire
- Country: England
- Denomination: Anglican
- Churchmanship: Church of England in the Liberal Catholic tradition
- Website: www.amesburyparishchurch.org

History
- Status: Parish church
- Dedication: Saint Mary and Saint Melor

Architecture
- Functional status: Active
- Style: Early English
- Years built: 12th century (nave), 13th century (chancel, tower), 1853 (restored)

Administration
- Province: Canterbury
- Diocese: Salisbury
- Archdeaconry: Sarum
- Deanery: Stonehenge
- Parish: Amesbury

Listed Building – Grade I
- Reference no.: 1182066

The Church of St Mary and St Melor is the parish church of the town of Amesbury, Wiltshire. The Grade I listed church dates from the 12th century and may be connected with the 10th-century Amesbury Priory or its 12th-century successor, Amesbury Abbey.

== History and architecture ==
The 1086 Domesday Book did not record a church or priest at Amesbury.

The church stands close to the River Avon, on the western edge of the modern town. Around 300 metres to the north is the presumed site of the earlier priory and abbey. The church is built in flint rubble and limestone ashlar and has a nave with clerestory and south aisle, central tower, north transept with east chapel, south transept and chancel. The south transept also had an east chapel which was later removed. The nave is from the second quarter of the 12th century and retains its original height and width, but may have been shortened at some point; the crossing, transepts and chancel are all from mid-13th century rebuilding and are about five degrees out of alignment with the nave. There may have been a north aisle or passage for some time before the 15th century.

Two windows were inserted in the chancel in the early 14th century, and in the late 15th the south aisle was added, larger east and west windows were installed, and the whole was re-roofed. The south front of the south transept was given new round-headed windows in 1721.

In 1852–3 William Butterfield reworked the west end, replaced the east window, and removed most of the fittings and monuments that were newer than c.1400. The chancel roof was made more steeply pitched; in 2020 it was found that the 15th-century roof was still in situ under the 19th-century work. At the same time the internal stairs giving access to the tower were replaced by an external stair-turret at the rear, in the north-east angle of the crossing. This was described as unsightly in 1900, and by Pevsner as "one of his most violent designs". One source states that Butterfield also rebuilt the tower.

Early in the 20th century, C.E. Ponting (the diocesan architect) and Detmar Blow carried out structural repairs which included rebuilding the piers of the crossing and the aisle. The building was designated as Grade I listed in 1958.

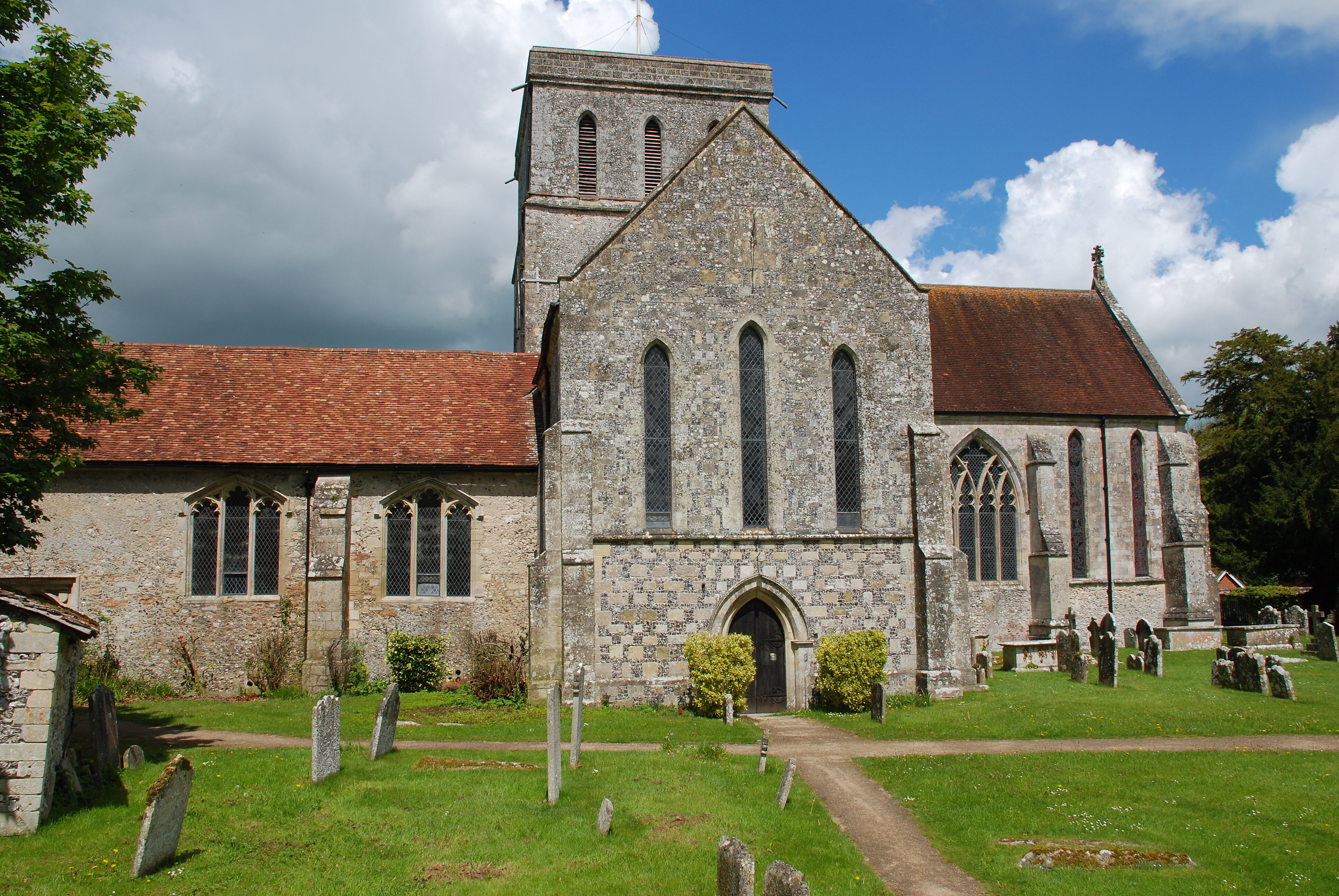
South elevation

== Monastery connections ==
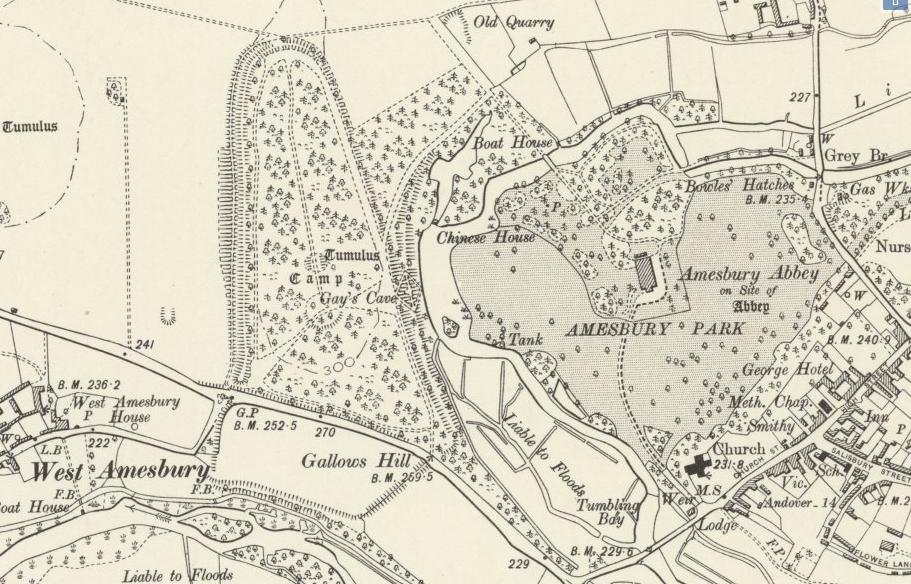
1901 map showing the church, the mansion and part of the town

The relationship between the church and the 10th-century Amesbury Priory or its 12th-century successor, Amesbury Abbey, is uncertain, although both are mentioned in Henry VII’s grant to the prioress of a July fair at Danebury.

The only archaeological evidence of the monasteries comes from construction work in 1859–1860 when extensive medieval foundations, including a richly tiled floor, were found immediately north of the mansion built on the abbey's land (also now called Amesbury Abbey).

Early antiquaries – notably Canon Jackson in 1867 – considered the building to be the priory church, interpreting the signs of structures formerly attached to its north side as including a cloister. C. H. Talbot disagreed in his 1900 paper for the Wiltshire Archaeological and Natural History Society, using records of the destruction of the priory church after the Dissolution, and sparse evidence for the continuation of a parish church thereafter. He concluded that the priory church was separate from the parish church, while speculating that the male members of the order may have used the parish church alongside the townsfolk.

The Victoria County History chapter on the abbey and priory (1956) supports the presence of two churches, and has an outline description of the convent's church, with its lead-covered spire. However, the listed building description, originally by Historic England in 1958, has no reservations in stating that the church is the "Abbey church of the Order of Fontevrault".

Pevsner (published 1975) is noncommital, commenting that the church is distant from the mansion site, but too large to be the parish church.

In 1979, John Chandler reviewed the evidence and supported the existence of two churches. He postulated that the prioress and nuns who arrived in 1177 at first occupied the existing buildings on the north side of the church, and by 1186 moved to a new church and convent on the site of the future mansion; soon after this the prior and his brethren arrived and used the older site, sharing the church with the town. The male community is known to have dwindled away during the 15th century. The former vicarage to the north-east (now demolished) is thought to have been part of the monastic buildings, and the absence of graves to the north of the church may be significant.

The Royal Commission on the Historical Monuments of England published in 1987 a study of the relationship between the priory and the present church. They consulted, amongst other sources, papers in the Longleat archive concerning the acquisition of the abbey's land by Edward Seymour and his agents' reports on demolition of the buildings. They concluded that there were two churches, and the existing building was either always simply the parish church (its generous size explained by the importance of Amesbury as a royal manor); or that the crossing and chancel were rebuilt in the 13th century to accommodate the male brethren. Since records of the priory church show dimensions almost the same as the present church, they postulate that the 13th-century design was copied from the nuns' church.

== Saint Melor ==
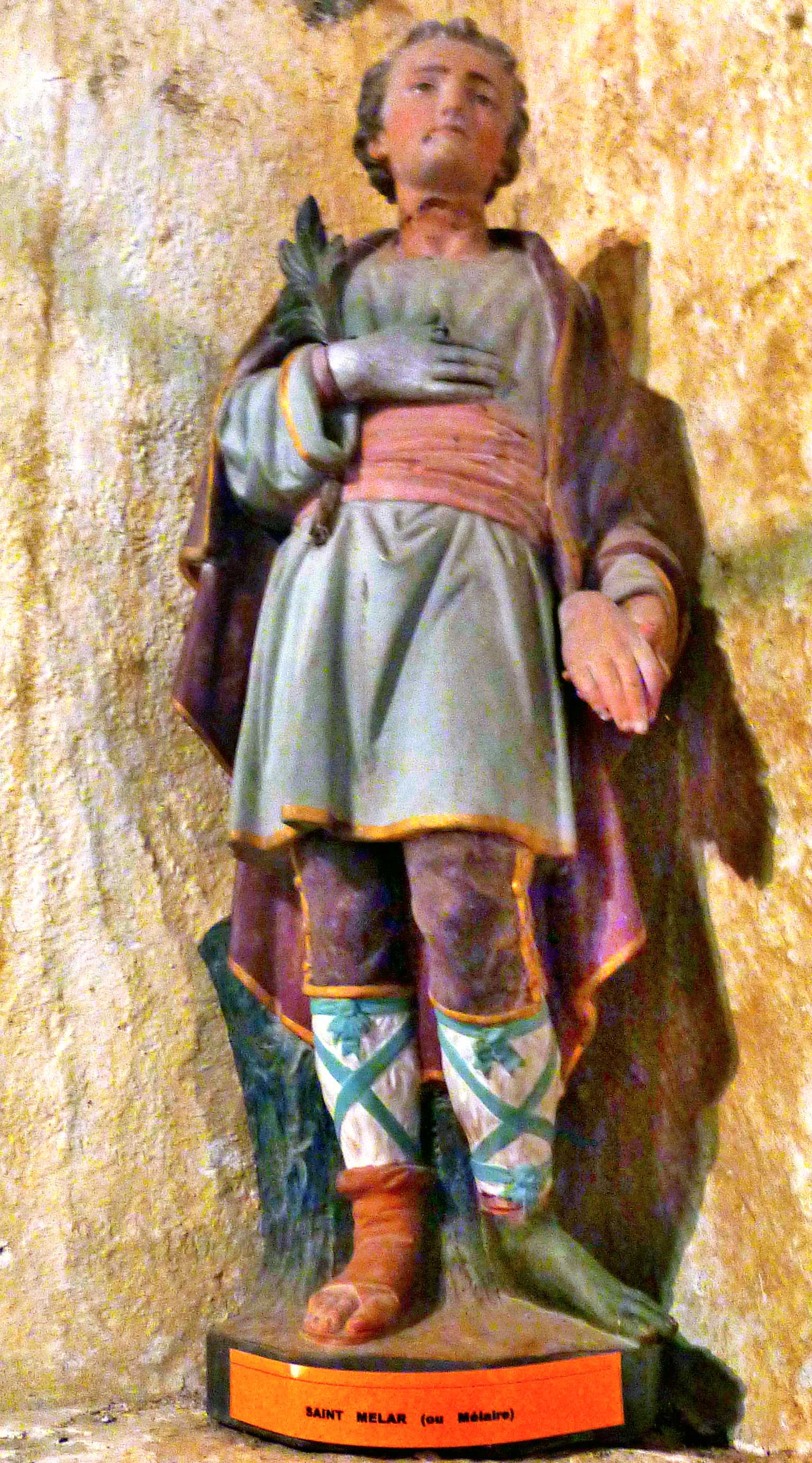
Mélar depicted in Chapelle Saint-Brieuc, Plonivel, Finistère, with severed hand

In Brittany and Cornwall, a cult of St Melor (French: Méloir or Mélar) developed in the 10th century. According to legend, he was maimed as a boy and murdered as a youth. Some of his relics were taken to Amesbury, either before or after the founding of the nunnery.

== Interior ==
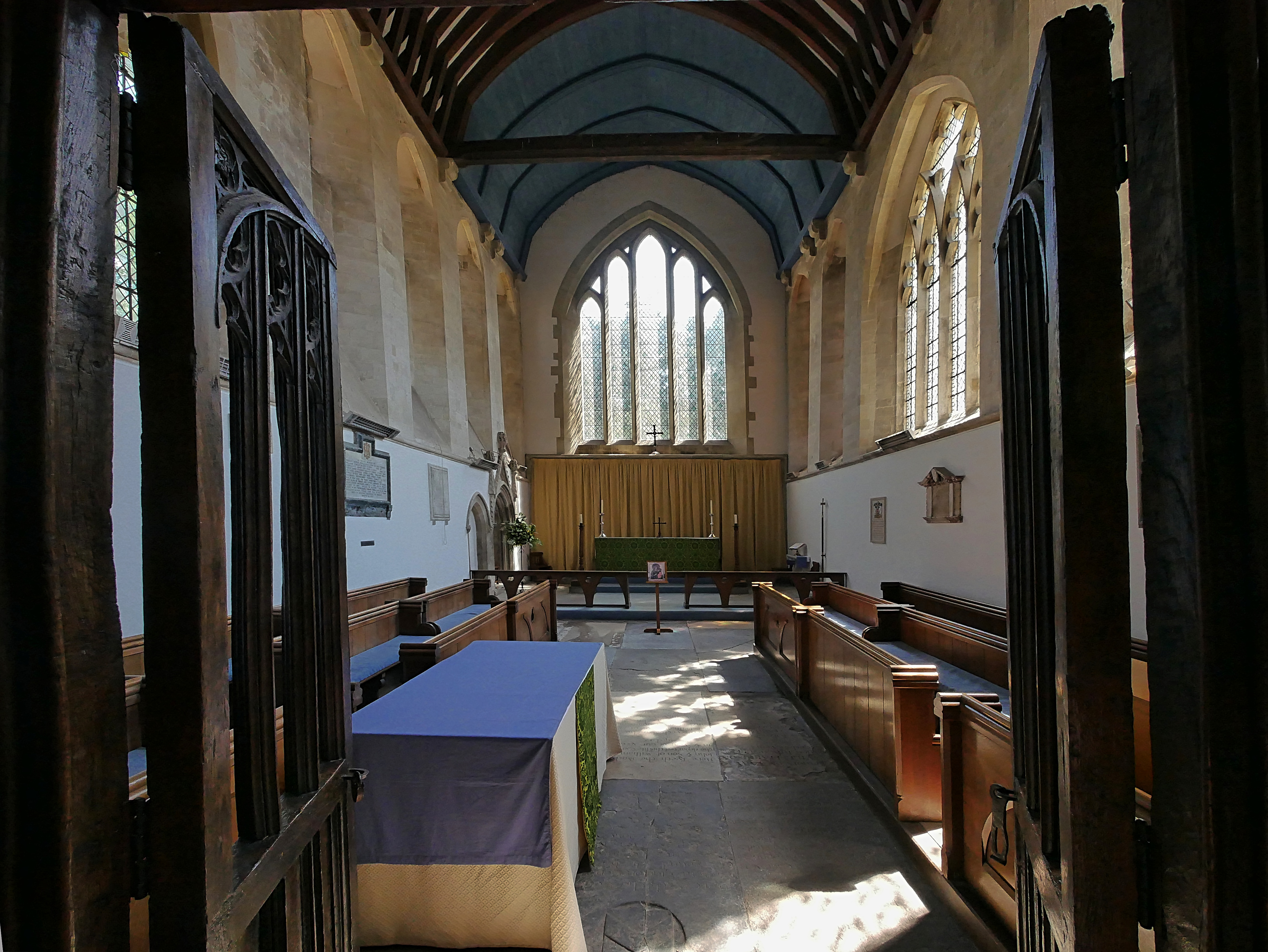
The chancel in 2018

The north-west window of the chancel has some 14th and 15th-century glass. Wall memorials range in date from 1683 to the 20th century, among them several in marble and gilt for members of the Antrobus family from the late 19th century onwards. In the nave is a brass memorial to Sir Edmund Antrobus, 2nd Baronet (1792–1870).

The 12th-century Purbeck marble font is on a 15th-century limestone base; there is a second medieval font at the west end. In the south transept is a 15th-century clock mechanism, in use until the early 20th century.

Three galleries were removed during 19th-century restoration. The 15th-century oak chancel screen was removed by Butterfield and reinstated in 1907. Butterfield designed new furnishings, including the pulpit; most of these survive, but his decoration of the east wall in marble and polychrome tiles is hidden behind a curtain, and has been covered since at least 1979.

The organ with its elaborate case came from the redundant St Edmund's Church, Salisbury in 1983, replacing an 1888 instrument which was in disrepair by 1979.

In 1946, two bells cast by John Taylor & Co were added to the six already in the tower; the oldest are two cast by John Wallis in 1619. The bells were retuned and rehung in 1999.

Parts of a Saxon wheel-cross were found under the chancel floor in 1907.

== Parish and churchmanship ==
Amesbury ecclesiastical parish has kept its separate identity. Since 1630, the right to appoint the incumbent – at first a curate and from 1868 a vicar – has been held by St George's Chapel, Windsor.

The church website describes a "Church of England church in the liberal-Catholic tradition". The Reverend Darren A'Court, vicar since 2015, is styled there as Father Darren.

== Associated monuments ==
The town's war memorial, a tall Latin cross on a large four-stepped pedestal, stands in the churchyard. It was designed by C.E. Ponting and erected in 1920 at a central road junction, then rededicated in 1948. In the 1960s the memorial was moved to make way for road improvements.

Also in the churchyard are several chest tombs from the 18th and 19th centuries. The churchyard was closed to new graves in 1860, on the opening of a town cemetery on land to the south-west.
