= Periculoso =

1298 papal decretal

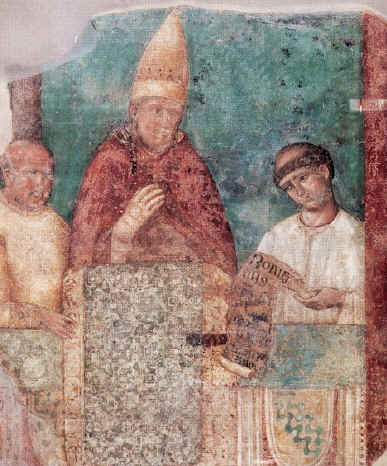
Pope Boniface VIII (middle), who issued the decretal in 1298, in a fresco by Giotto

Periculoso (named for its Latin incipit, meaning dangerous) was a papal decretal of Pope Boniface VIII issued in 1298, that required the claustration of Catholic nuns. It is often incorrectly referred to as a papal bull.

== Canonical status ==
Periculoso was later incorporated into the Liber Sextus, a compilation of papal legislation. Many of the specific requirements of Periculoso were often disobeyed in practice, and "Councils and bishops struggled manfully to put into force" its teachings for the next three centuries. The decretal was first confirmed in 1309 by the encyclical Apostolicae sedis of Pope Clement V. Three 16th-century papal bulls were also promulgated to reinforce the basic principles of Periculoso: Circa pastoralis (1566) and Decori et honestati (1570) of Pope Pius V and Deo sacris (1572) of Pope Gregory XIII. The Council of Trent (1563) in its final session reiterated the commandments of the decretal and added new and stiff sanctions for violators. By the time of the Council, the decretals dictates had largely become synonymous with traditional conceptions of nunhood; for example, the Council referred to enclosure as the "primary obligation for nuns".

Some contemporary commentators regarded the regulations of Periculoso as either repetitive with or derivative of existing monastic vows; others considered it far stricter than the prevailing social contract between nuns and the ecclesiastical hierarchy at the time.

== Content and application ==
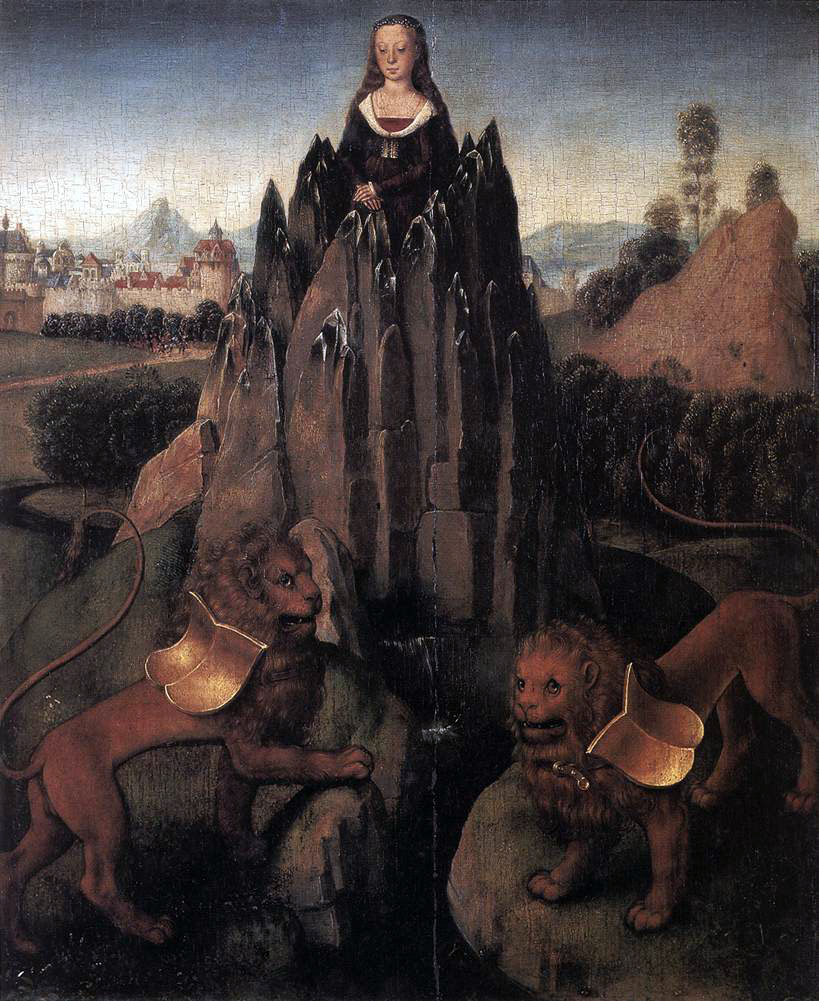
Allegory of chastity by Hans Memling

Periculoso attempted both to "standardize" the lives of nuns from different houses and orders around the practice of "enclosure" and to demarcate distinctions between nuns and monks. The severity of the enforcement of the directive varied considerably across Europe, in part because the strict enforcement of the practice of enclosure would have "undermine[d] the economic stability" of many convents because of the way they generated revenue and solicited contributions within their communities.

Periculoso states:

Wishing to provide for the dangerous and abominable situation of certain nuns, who, casting off the reins of respectability and impudently abandoning nunnish modesty and the natural bashfulness of their sex ... we do firmly decree ... that nuns collectively and individually, both at present and in future, of whatsoever community or order, in whatever part of the world they may be, ought henceforth to remain perpetually cloistered in their monasteries ... so that [the nuns] be able to serve God more freely, wholly separated from the public and worldly gaze and, occasions for lasciviousness having been removed, may most diligently safeguard their hearts and bodies in complete chastity.

One of the main rationales for enclosure in the directive was the alleged licentiousness of many nuns; However, empirical inquiries into the prevalence of sexually active nuns reveal that most were involved with priests already incorporated into the convent or with male agents whose presence was required as a result of enclosure. Such results are consistent with contemporary criticism of the decretal, for example by Humbert de Romans, the Master General of the Dominican Order. For its part, Periculoso was conscious to some degree of the financial predicaments of many monasteries, and required the careful monitoring of the size of convents in an attempt to ensure that they did not outgrow their financial supports.

In the wake of the promulgation of the decretal, walls, locked doors, and barred and grated windows became nearly (but not completely) ubiquitous in monasteries. Architectural divisions became prominent markers of the regulation of the shared space that remained (such as chapels). However, the delay of the implementation of claustration in some areas was dramatic; for example, in Lower Saxony, the enclosure of female monastic communities did not become prominent until the mid-fifteenth century (due to the efforts of Johannes Busch). According to Lowe, Venice was the only state in the Italian Peninsula which did not eventually implement the decretal due to a dispute between the patriarch of Grado and the pope over the nuns of S. Maria Celeste.

One side effect of the decretal was the rapid urbanization of European monasteries, often to locations near city gates, due to economic necessity.

== Interpretation ==
Elizabeth Makowski interprets the document as an attempt to "safeguard nuns from themselves; to diminish, if not completely remove, worldly temptations". Makowski further views Periculoso as a means of "controlling female religiosity" in the face of movements such as the Guglielmites which had begun to challenge papal supremacy and advocate radical roles for women in the 13th century. Brundage and Makowski conclude that Periculoso made enclosure "an end in itself to which other values of religious life were increasingly subordinated". Similarly, Rapley argues that "'celibacy for the kingdom,' became little by little, and exclusively for women, an end in itself to which all feminine religious life had to be subordinated.

The document has been interpreted as a "watershed in the history of female monasticism". Departing from earlier (informal) traditions of enclosure, Periculoso focuses on the nuns' own "propensity for sinful behavior" rather than the dangers of the external world.

Some commentators have argued that Periculoso was meant only to have a symbolic impact; others that its intent was additionally to change the material conditions in nunneries across Europe. Indeed, the decretal itself contends that "it is pointless indeed to make laws unless someone be designated to enforce them" (in the case of Periculoso, the prelates were so designated). English canonist John of Ayton commented that the decretal was merely a "dead letter" and that there was "scare any mortal man who could do this". Of course, episcopal records abound of bishops who did in fact attempt to enforce the decretal, both successfully and unsuccessfully.

== See also ==
- Consecrated life (Catholic Church)
