= Eleanor of Brittany (abbess) =

Abbess (1275–1342)

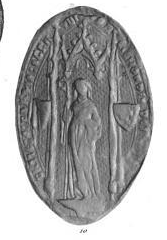
- Born: 1275
- Died: 16 May 1342 (aged 66–67)
- Father: John II, Duke of Brittany
- Mother: Beatrice of England

Eleanor of Brittany (1275 – 16 May 1342) was the sixteenth abbess of Fontevrault.

== Biography ==
She was born in England to John II, Duke of Brittany and Beatrice of England, and therefore granddaughter to King Henry III. In 1281 at the age of seven, she entered Amesbury Priory in Wiltshire, a priory of the Fontevrault order (her first cousin, twice removed, Eleanor, Fair Maid of Brittany is buried there). Her grandmother, Eleanor of Provence, decided to live out her retirement at this priory, and had earlier lobbied for Eleanor and another granddaughter, Mary of Woodstock, to join her at Amesbury.

In March 1291 she took her vows and became a nun and some time afterwards (possibly 1294) she moved to Fontevrault Abbey in the Loire region of France, the parent abbey of the order. The richly illuminated Fontevraud Gradual was presented to her.

In 1304, she became abbess. Her time in leadership of the abbey was punctuated internal conflicts and attempts to re-affirm and consolidate of her authority as abbess. In 1309 she appointed a French prioress to Amesbury and only after the King formally requested her to do so did she back down. In 1317 there was a serious dispute about who should become Prioress of Nuneaton, with one Isabel of Sudley usurping the position with the backing of Walter Langton. Eleanor appointed Katherine de Stafford, Isabelle refused to accept this, and the dispute continued, involving two appeals to the Pope, death threats, and the pillaging of the Priory in 1322, was only settled in 1328.

Soon after 1313, Eleanor's cousin, Mary of Woodstock, was removed from her role as visitor of Amesbury Priory. In 1317, Mary's brother Edward, by now King Edward II of England, asked Eleanor to restore her to the post, but his request was refused. But Mary persevered and obtained a papal mandate requiring her reinstatement, which Eleanor appears to have obeyed. Upon her death in 1342 she bequeathed the gradual to the abbey. It survives to this day and is held by the public library of Limoges.
