= Westwood Priory =

Benedictine nunnery in Worcestershire, England

Coordinates: 52.270°N 2.174°W

Westwood Priory (priory of St. Mary) was a priory of Benedictine nuns founded in 1153, near Droitwich, Worcestershire, England. It was a daughter house of Fontevraud Abbey, seized by the English crown in 1537 during the Dissolution of the monasteries.

== History ==
Eustachia de Say and her son Osbert FitzHugh gave the church located at Westwood to Fontevraud Abbey, in the Loire valley, where Henry II of England, his wife Queen Eleanor of Aquitaine and their son Richard I (the Lionheart) are buried. Soon afterwards, a small priory was erected at Westwood, dedicated to the Blessed Virgin Mary, for six Benedictine nuns.

Over the centuries the convent grew until it ultimately numbered eighteen sisters. A group from Westwood moved to Amesbury Priory subsequent to its being refounded in 1177.

In 1460, Elizabeth Norton is named as prioress of Westwode, Worcs, in a legal dispute.

The last prioress, Joyce Acton, received at the dissolution an annual pension of ten pounds, on 11 March 1537.

After the dissolution Henry VIII granted Westwood, with its demesne lands, to Sir John Pakington and in the reign of Elizabeth Westwood House was built on the property as a banqueting house. When the Pakington family seat in the adjacent village of Hampton Lovett was burnt down during the English Civil War they moved to Westwood.
