= Fontevraud-l'Abbaye =

- Commune
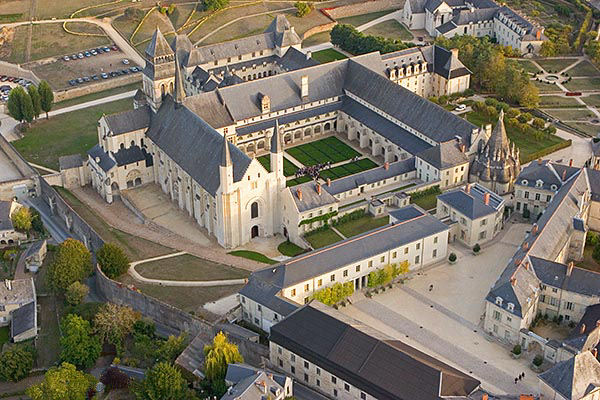
- Aerial view of Fontevraud Abbey

- Coat of arms
- Location of Fontevraud-l'Abbaye
- Location within France Location within Pays de la Loire
- Coordinates: 47°10′59″N 0°03′02″E
- Country: France
- Region: Pays de la Loire
- Department: Maine-et-Loire
- Arrondissement: Saumur
- Canton: Saumur
- Intercommunality: CA Saumur Val de Loire

Government
  - Mayor (2020–2026): Sandrine Lion
- Area^{1}: 14.86 km^{2} (5.74 sq mi)
- Elevation: 80 m (260 ft)
- Highest elevation: 114 m (374 ft)
- Lowest elevation: 37 m (121 ft)
- Population (2023): 1,453
  - Density: 97.78/km^{2} (253.2/sq mi)
- Demonym: Fontevriste
- Time zone: UTC+01:00 (CET)
  - Summer (DST): UTC+02:00 (CEST)
- INSEE/Postal code: 49140 /49590
- Website: www.fontevraud-abbaye.fr
- ^{1} French Land Register data, which excludes lakes, ponds, glaciers > 1 km^{2} (0.386 sq mi or 247 acres) and river estuaries.

Fontevraud-l'Abbaye (French pronunciation: [fɔ̃təvʁo labei]) is a commune in the western French department of Maine-et-Loire. It is situated both in the Loire Valley, a UNESCO World Heritage Site between Chalonnes-sur-Loire and Sully-sur-Loire, and the Loire Anjou Touraine French regional natural park.

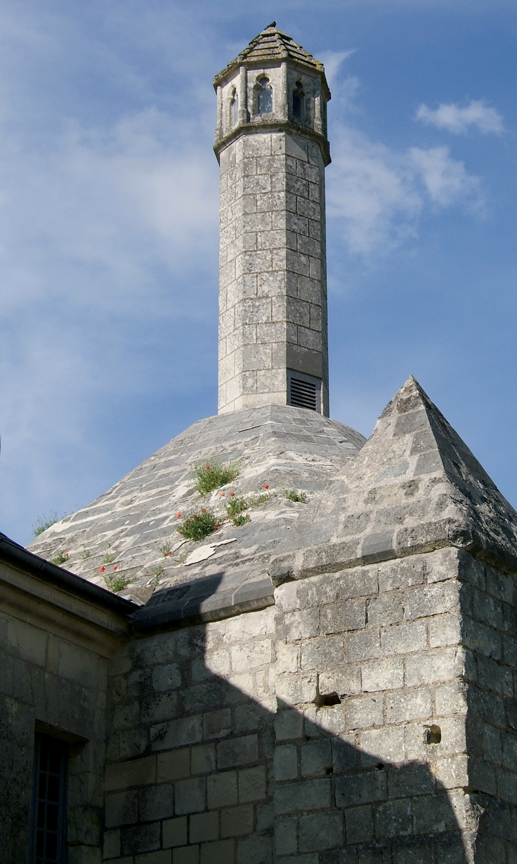
The lantern of the dead of St Catherine's chapel

== Notable buildings ==
- The royal abbey of Fontevraud
- Saint Catherine's chapel with its lantern of the dead
- Chapelle Notre-Dame-de-Pitié (chapel of Our Lady of Compassion)
- Église Saint-Michel (church of St Michael)

== See also ==
- Communes of the Maine-et-Loire department
