= Data center =

Facility used to house computer servers

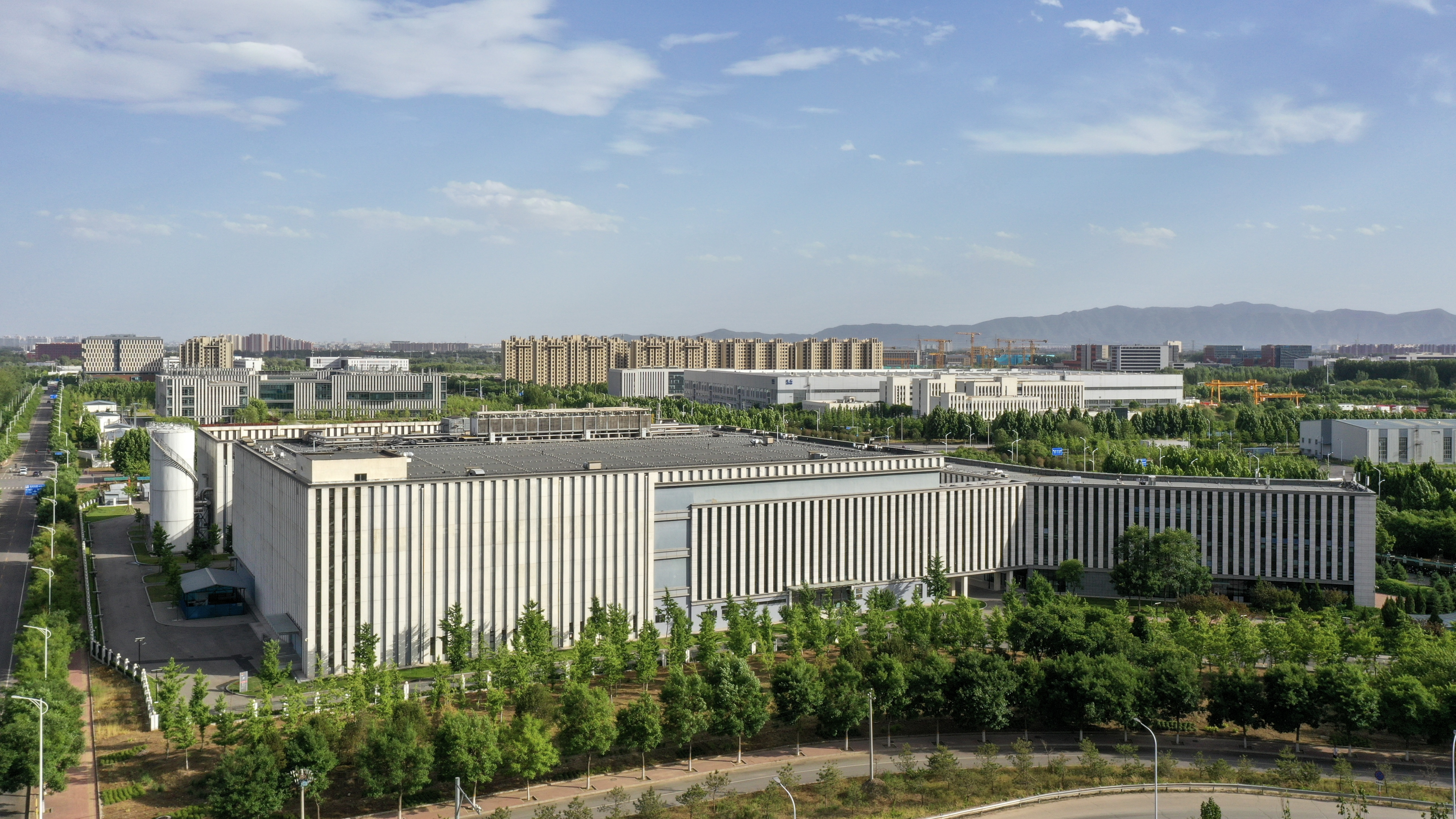
A CNPC data center in Beijing

A data center is a facility (typically a building or room) dedicated to housing computer equipment for the storage, manipulation, and transmission of digital information. It typically includes computer servers, data storage devices, networking and telecommunication equipment, electricity distribution, cooling systems, and security measures.

Data centers can be used for a variety of purposes, such as meeting an organization's in-house computing needs, parallel computing for scientific or military applications, operating web servers, providing software as a service (often via web applications), providing services needed by mobile apps, hosting an Internet exchange point, or training or running artificial intelligence models. Early computers such as ENIAC, completed in 1945 by the United States military, occupied entire rooms, and could be thought of as the first data centers. Enterprise data centers are those operated by an organization for its own use.

In the early 21st century, it became more common to use cloud computing services in data centers owned and operated by providers like Amazon Web Services, Google Cloud Platform, IBM Cloud, and Microsoft Azure. The largest cloud computing data centers are known as hyperscale, and can contain thousands of servers, many kilometers of high-speed network cable, and occupy up to 10,000,000 sq ft (930,000 m^{2}). Managed service data centers have third-party managers hired on behalf of a company, which leases the equipment and infrastructure instead of buying it. Colocation data centers allow companies to rent space in an off-site data center owned by others, with the colocation data center hosting the infrastructure while the company provides and manages the components. Edge data centers are smaller, decentralized facilities located closer to end users and devices. In the 2024 U.S. Data Center Energy Usage Report, Lawrence Berkeley National Laboratory estimated that hyperscale and colocation centers contained 74% of computer servers in 2023.

== Impact ==
Large data centers require significant energy to operate, with the largest consuming over 3,000 MW, raising concerns about energy use. The International Energy Agency (IEA) estimated that electricity consumption from these data centers amounted to around 415 terawatt hours (TWh), about 1.5% of global electricity consumption in 2024, with a growth rate of 12% per year over the previous five years. The IEA projects that this amount could double to reach around 945 TWh by 2030, growing by around 15% per year. In the US alone, which has almost nine times more data centers than any other country, power consumption by data centers is projected to account for "almost half of the growth in electricity demand" between 2025 and 2030. This includes increased electricity costs.

Concerns over environmental impact, energy and water use, and other costs have led to opposition to new data centers during the AI boom. These movements have occurred in parts of Europe, the US, and South America. Data Center Watch's first report covered a period from May 2024 to March 2025, during which it found that "local opposition had blocked or delayed a total of $64 billion in data center projects (six projects were blocked entirely, while 10 were delayed)".

Data centers also represent a significant driver of economic activity and technological capacity. In the United States, the industry contributed an estimated $486 billion to GDP and supported 4.2 million total jobs in 2021, with each direct position generating more than six additional jobs elsewhere in the economy, according to a PwC economic impact analysis. Independent academic research has further found measurable employment and wage effects in local labor markets where large facilities are built. At the same time, the rapid expansion of data centers has raised concerns about resource consumption, including increased electricity costs, and has prompted opposition to new projects in places including Europe, the United States, India, Malaysia, Australia, and South America. Further concerns are driven by the extreme ratio of permanent jobs to temporary construction roles created, suggesting most advocates to be overpromising job creation numbers. These numerous construction roles create further economic strain in places where the sudden boom outstrips the supply of available construction workers, such as Australia.

== Types ==
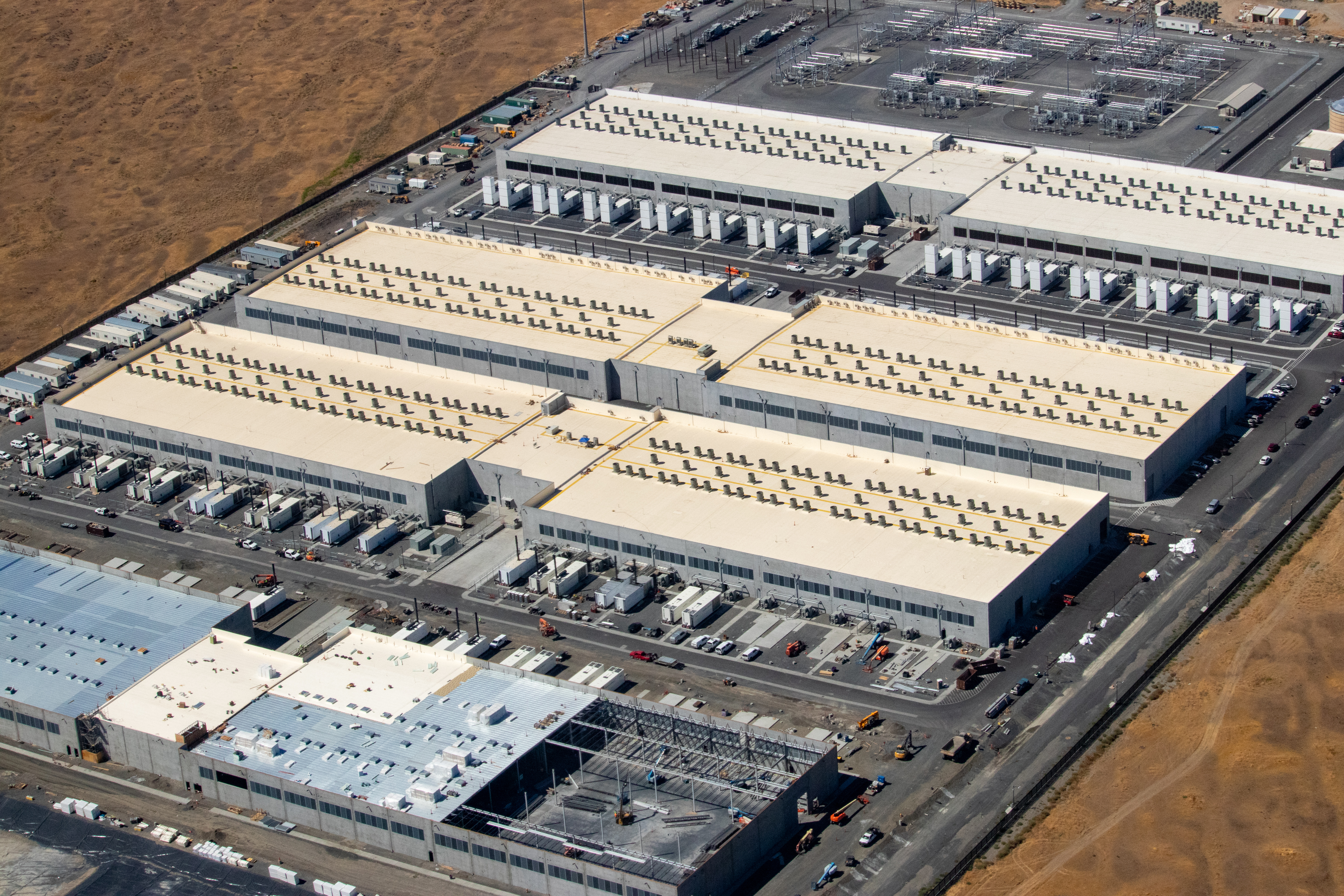
Amazon Web Services Data Center in the U.S.

Data centers are usually classified according to their ownership model, scale, and intended use.

Common data center types and typical characteristics
Type	Typical scale	Primary purpose	Key characteristic
Edge	1–10 MW	Low-latency local processing	Distributed near end users or data sources
Enterprise	1–10 MW	Internal IT operations	Owned and operated by a single organization
Colocation	10–100 MW	Shared hosting for multiple clients	Customers lease space, power, and cooling
Hyperscale	100 MW+	Cloud services and AI workloads	Massive scalability; operated by major cloud providers

Distribution of computing workloads across these four categories has shifted dramatically over the past decade, with hyperscale and colocation collectively accounting for approximately 74% of U.S. server energy consumption in 2023, up from less than 40% in 2014; this share is projected to reach 85% by 2028. However, these classifications are not mutually exclusive from each other, and they may overlap depending on the operational structure and service model of the particular data center.

=== Enterprise ===
Enterprise data centers are owned and managed by a single organization to meet its internal information technology (IT) needs rather than to host data for other companies commercially. They used to be essential infrastructures; as in 2014, enterprise data centers accounted for over 60% of the U.S. server energy consumption, but this share fell sharply to about 10% by 2023 as workloads migrated to hyperscale and colocation facilities. Energy efficiency at an enterprise data center tends to be significantly lower than at hyperscale facilities due to its cooling, which can account for over 30% of electricity consumption at enterprise sites, compared to roughly 7% at efficient hyperscale data centers. The shift away from enterprise facilities toward cloud and colocation infrastructure is one of the defining structural trends of the previous decade.

=== Colocation ===
Colocation centers provide shared physical infrastructure, such as power, cooling, space, etc., to multiple tenants who lease space rather than building their own facilities. Colocation data centers reduce expenditure for organizations while enabling operators to achieve economies of scale in power procurement and cooling efficiency. Some of the largest data centers in the world are colocation centers, and this category accounted for about 22% of worldwide data center capacity as of 2024, making them the second-largest category by capacity after hyperscale facilities. Major colocation providers include Equinix, Switch, COPT, and Digital Realty, which operate facilities across multiple continents.

Colocation centers often host private peering connections between their customers, internet transit providers, internet service providers, cloud providers, meet-me rooms for connecting customers, Internet exchange points, and landing points and terminal equipment for fiber optic submarine communication cables, which are critical to connecting the internet.

=== Hyperscale ===
Hyperscale data centers are large-scale facilities, typically exceeding 100 megawatts of power capacity, designed to support massive, scalable computing workloads for cloud services, AI training, and large-scale data processing. By the end of 2024, there were 1,136 operational hyperscale data centers globally, a figure that doubled over the previous five years, with the U.S. accounting for approximately 54% of total hyperscale capacity. In particular, the three largest operators, Amazon Web Services, Microsoft Azure, and Google Cloud, collectively account for approximately 59% of all hyperscale data center capacity globally. As a growing trend, hyperscale data centers represented about 41% of worldwide data center capacity in 2024 and are projected to exceed 60% by 2029 as enterprise on-premises infrastructure continues to decline. AI data centers are being built more rapidly than conventional data centers; the International Energy Agency notes that while a typical data center can consume as much electricity as 100,000 households, the largest next-generation campuses currently under construction are expected to demand roughly 20 times that amount.

=== Edge ===
Edge data centers are smaller facilities, typically ranging from 1 to 10 megawatts. They are positioned closer to end users or data sources to reduce network latency and support real-time applications, such as autonomous vehicles, industrial automation, and content delivery. Unlike hyperscale data centers, edge data centers are intentionally distributed across many locations rather than consolidated, with deployments occurring in urban areas, cell tower sites, as well as industrial locations. The growth of edge computing infrastructure has been tied to the expansion of 5G wireless networks and the increasing use of Internet of Things (IoT) devices, which generate data that is more efficiently processed near its source than transmitted to a centralized data center.

Micro data centers (MDCs) are access-level data centers that are smaller than traditional data centers but provide the same features. They are typically located near the data source to reduce communication delays, as their small size allows several MDCs to be spread out over a wide area. MDCs are suited to user-facing, front end applications. They are commonly used in edge computing and other areas where low latency data processing is needed.

==== Modularity and flexibility ====
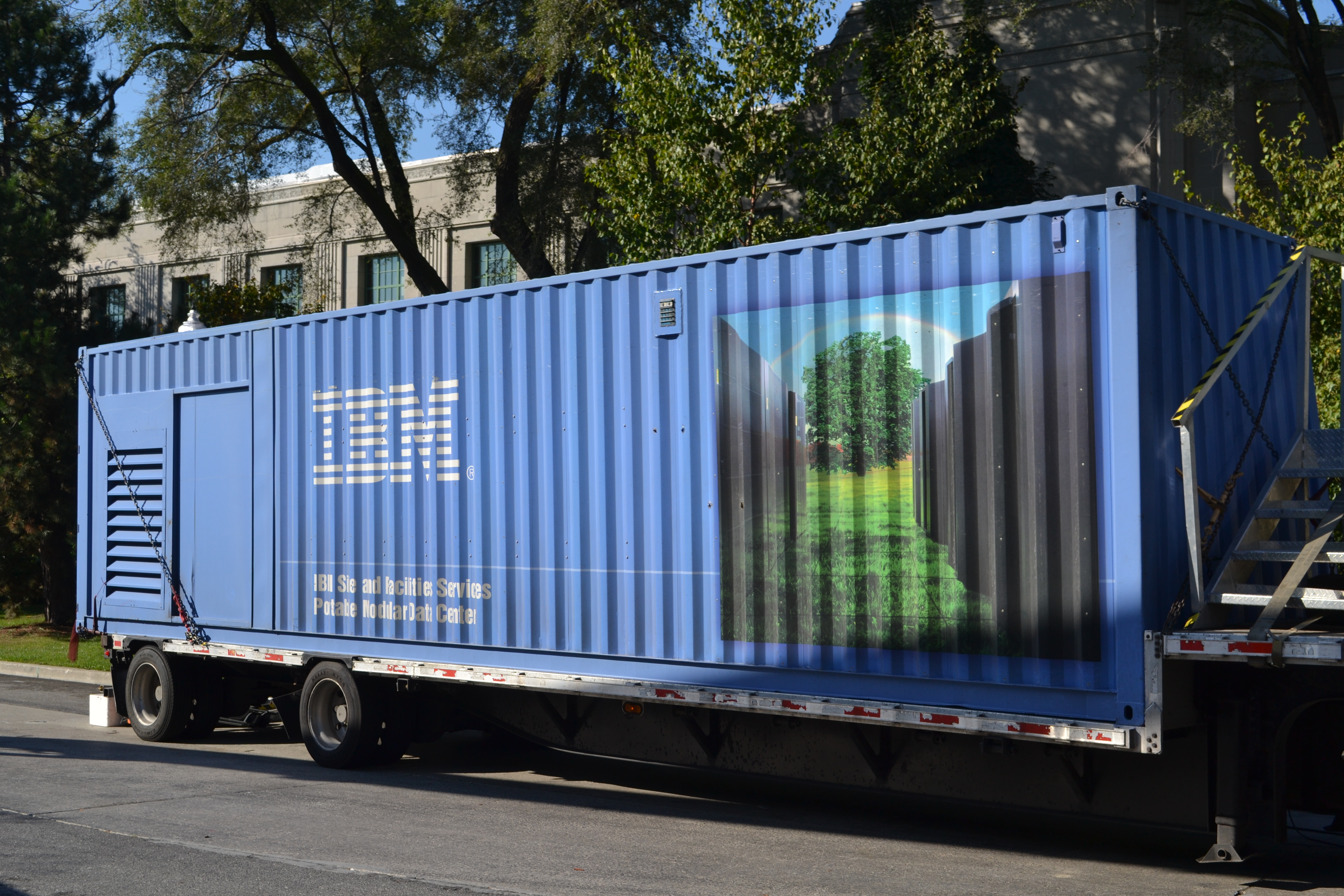
A 40-foot Portable Modular Data Center

Modularity and flexibility are key elements in allowing a data center to grow and change over time. Data center modules are pre-engineered, standardized building blocks that can be configured and moved as needed.

A modular data center may consist of data center equipment contained within shipping containers or similar portable containers. Components of the data center can be prefabricated and standardized, which facilitates moving if needed.

These modular data centers are useful for IT disaster recovery. Mobile data centers are also used to move large quantities of data, by physically transporting the hardware that contains it, and in cryptocurrency mining, where fleets of mobile data centers are transported to take advantage of cheaper sources of energy.

== History ==
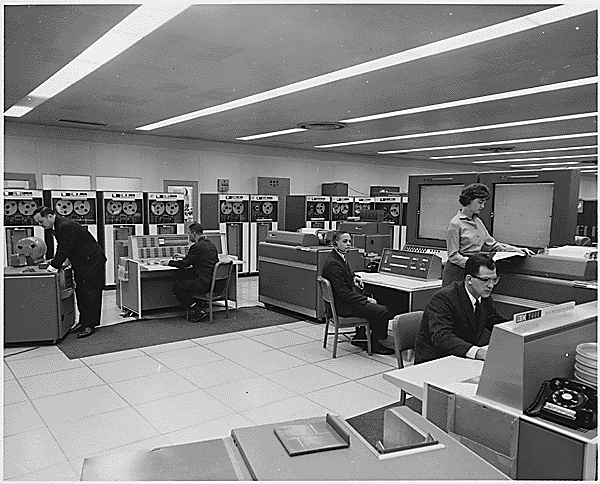
NASA mission control center computer room c. 1962

Data centers have their roots in the huge computer rooms of the 1940s, typified by the Electronic Numerical Integrator and Computer (ENIAC), one of the earliest examples of what has become known as a data center. (Note: Old large computer rooms that housed machines like the U.S. Army's ENIAC, which were developed pre-1960 (1945), are now referred to as data centers.) Early computer systems were complex to operate and maintain, and required a special environment in which to operate. Many cables were necessary to connect all of the components, and methods to accommodate and organize these were devised, such as standard racks to mount equipment, raised floors, and cable trays (installed overhead or under the elevated floor). A single mainframe required a great deal of power and had to be cooled to avoid overheating. Security became important— computers were expensive, and were often used for government and military purposes. (Note: Until the early 1960s, it was primarily the government that used computers, which were large mainframes housed in rooms that today we call data centers.) As such, basic design guidelines for controlling access to the computer room were devised.

During the microcomputer industry boom of the 1980s, computers started to be deployed everywhere, in many cases with little or no care about operating requirements. However, as information technology (IT) operations started to grow in complexity, organizations grew aware of the need to control IT resources. The availability of inexpensive networking equipment, coupled with new standards for the network structured cabling, made it possible to use a hierarchical design that put servers in a specific room inside the company. The use of the term data center, as applied to specially designed computer rooms, started to gain popular recognition about this time. (Note: In the 1990s, network-connected minicomputers (servers) running without input or display devices were housed in the old computer rooms. These new "data centers" or "server rooms" were built within company walls, co-located with low-cost networking equipment.)

During the dot-com bubble (1997–2000), there was a boom in data center construction because companies needed fast Internet connectivity and non-stop operation to establish their Internet presence. Many companies started building very large facilities, called internet data centers (IDCs), which provided enhanced capabilities, such as crossover backup: "If a Bell Atlantic line is cut, we can transfer them to ... to minimize the time of outage."

The global data center market saw steady growth in the 2010s, with a notable acceleration in the latter half of the decade. According to Gartner, worldwide data center infrastructure spending reached $200 billion in 2021, representing a 6% increase from 2020 despite economic challenges posed by the COVID-19 pandemic.

In 2024, global energy consumption from data centers was 620 TWh, with 80% of that consumption concentrated in the U.S., China, and the United Kingdom. Colocation centers were the most common category worldwide, with 4,799 colocation centers in 127 countries. In that year, the largest data center in the world was Citadel, owned by Switch, at the Tahoe Reno Industrial Center in Reno, Nevada, occupying 7.2 million square feet.

Growth of the data center industry has prompted local resistance. A 2023 survey found social mobilizations against the industry in Europe, the U.S., and South America. These movements expressed concern about the centers' energy and water use, pollution, and impact on agriculture or the landscape. A 2026 poll by Politico suggested that resistance to growth of the industry would make candidates' stance on data centers a significant issue for voters in the U.S.

=== In the United States ===
The U.S. hosted 5,381 data centers in March 2024, the highest number of any country worldwide, accounting for 40% of the global market in 2023. As of 2025, roughly one third of America's data centers were in three states: Virginia (643), Texas (395), and California (319).

The largest concentration of data centers in the world is in Northern Virginia, with over 250 facilities in the region. In 2025, Georgia was the fastest growing data center hub in the U.S., having enacted several state tax exemptions for the industry and hosting between 100 and 150 centers in the state. Local governments have responded to the growing industry in Georgia with a variety of local ordinances to guide permitting of these facilities.

In 2025, it was estimated that the U.S. GDP growth was only 0.1% without the investments in data centers for artificial intelligence.

In 2026, more than 300 jurisdictions across 44 U.S. states had enacted moratoriums on data center development, amid concerns over electricity consumption, water use, noise and local environmental impacts.

== Design and architecture ==
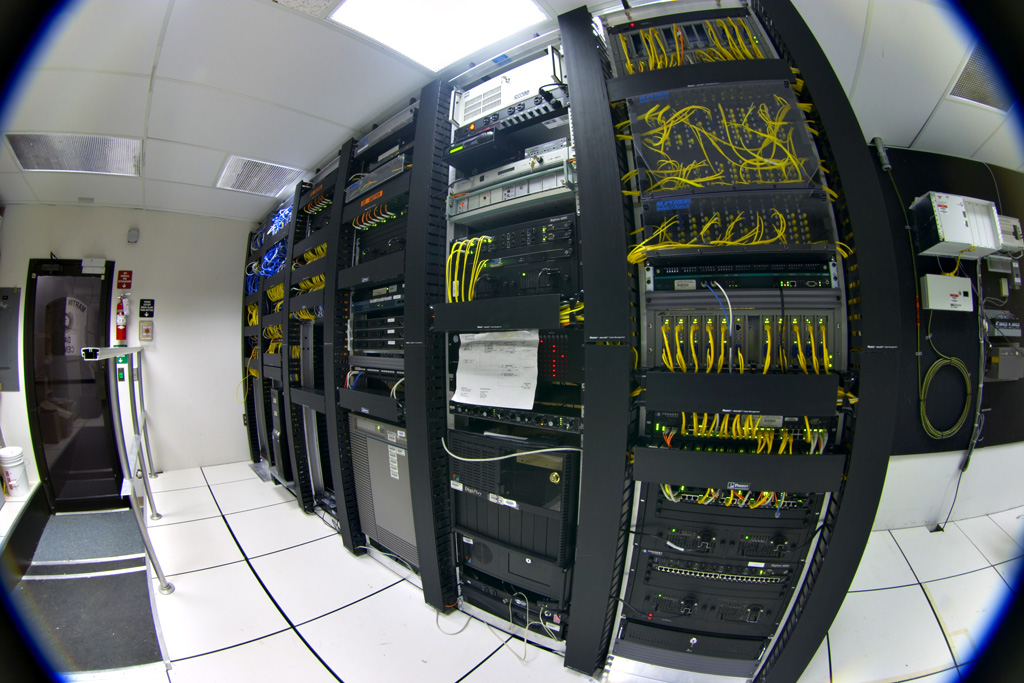
Racks of telecommunications equipment in part of a data center

Data centers house critical computing resources in a controlled environment and must generally operate with very high availability. Key design elements include providing power for the equipment, temperature and humidity control, cabling, fire safety, and security. Information security is also a concern. For this reason, a data center must provide a secure environment that minimizes the risk of a security breach.

=== Obsolescence and modernization ===
Industry research company International Data Corporation (IDC) put the average age of a data center at nine years As of August 2011. As of December 2024, the mean age of data center facilities had risen to 11.3 years, according to research analyst Jacqueline Davis of the Uptime Institute. Gartner, another research company, argued in 2010 that data centers older than seven years are obsolete. The growth in data volume (163 zettabytes by 2025) is one factor driving the need for data centers to modernize. That focus is not new: rapid obsolescence of data center equipment was a concern by at least 2007, and in May 2011, the data center research organization Uptime Institute reported that 36 percent of the large companies it surveyed expected to exhaust IT capacity within the next 18 months.

=== Industry standards ===
The Telecommunications Industry Association (TIA)'s Telecommunications Infrastructure Standard for Data Centers specifies the minimum requirements for telecommunications infrastructure of data centers and computer rooms, including single tenant enterprise data centers and multi-tenant Internet hosting data centers. The topology proposed in this document is intended to be applicable to any size data center.

Telcordia GR-3160, NEBS Requirements for Telecommunications Data Center Equipment and Spaces, provides guidelines for data center spaces within telecommunications networks, and environmental requirements for the equipment intended for installation in those spaces. These criteria were developed jointly by Telcordia and industry representatives. They may be applied to data center spaces housing data processing or IT equipment. The equipment may be used to:

- Operate and manage a carrier's telecommunication network
- Translate raw consumption data into usage metrics that integrate directly with utility billing and customer service platforms
- Continuously monitor data streams to alert utilities of irregular spikes, line leaks, or power outages.
- Provide data center-based applications directly to the carrier's customers
- Provide hosted applications for a third party to provide services to their customers
- Provide a combination of these and similar data center applications

=== Reliability of electrical power supply ===
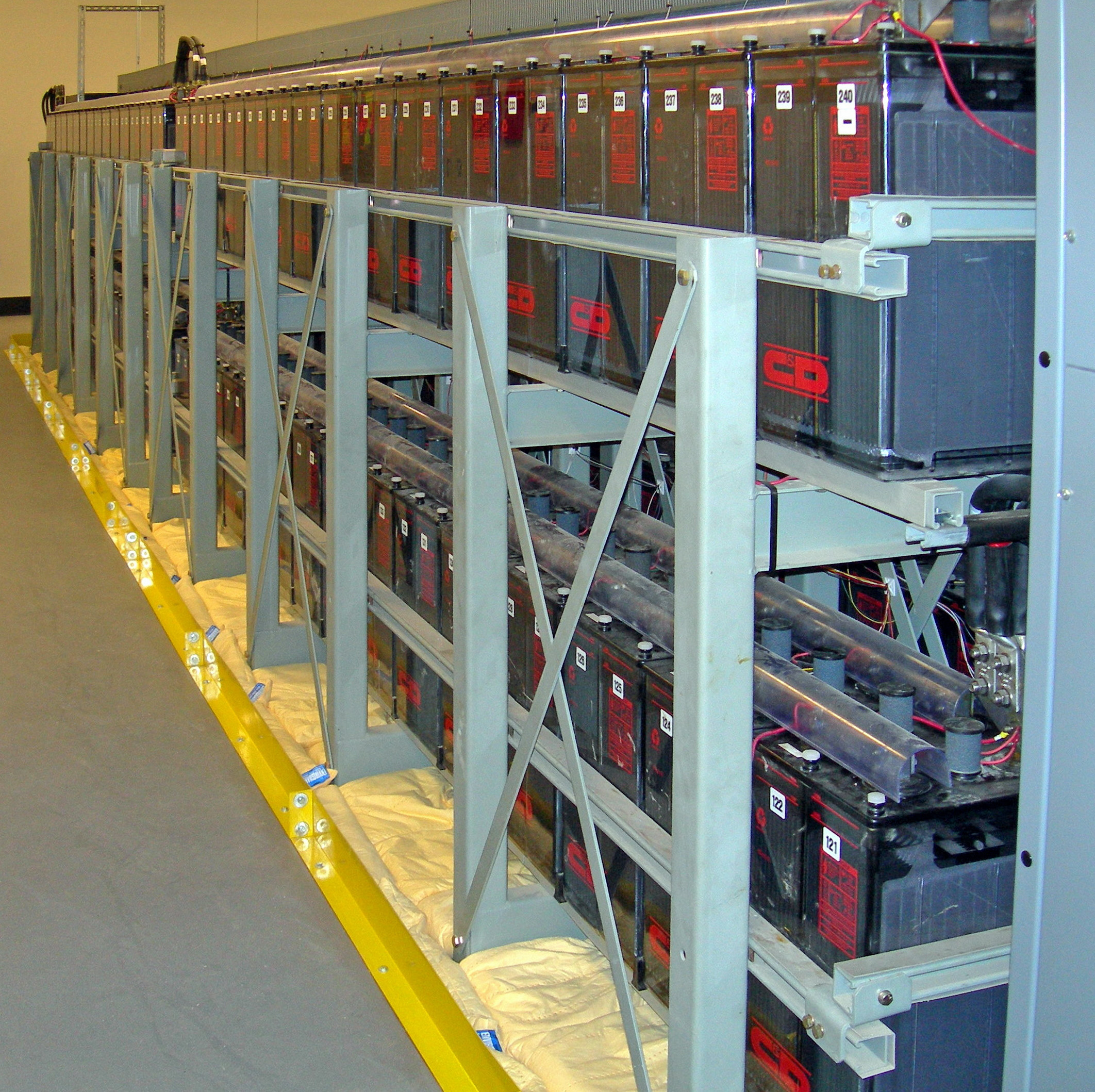
A bank of batteries in a large data center, used to provide power until diesel generators can start

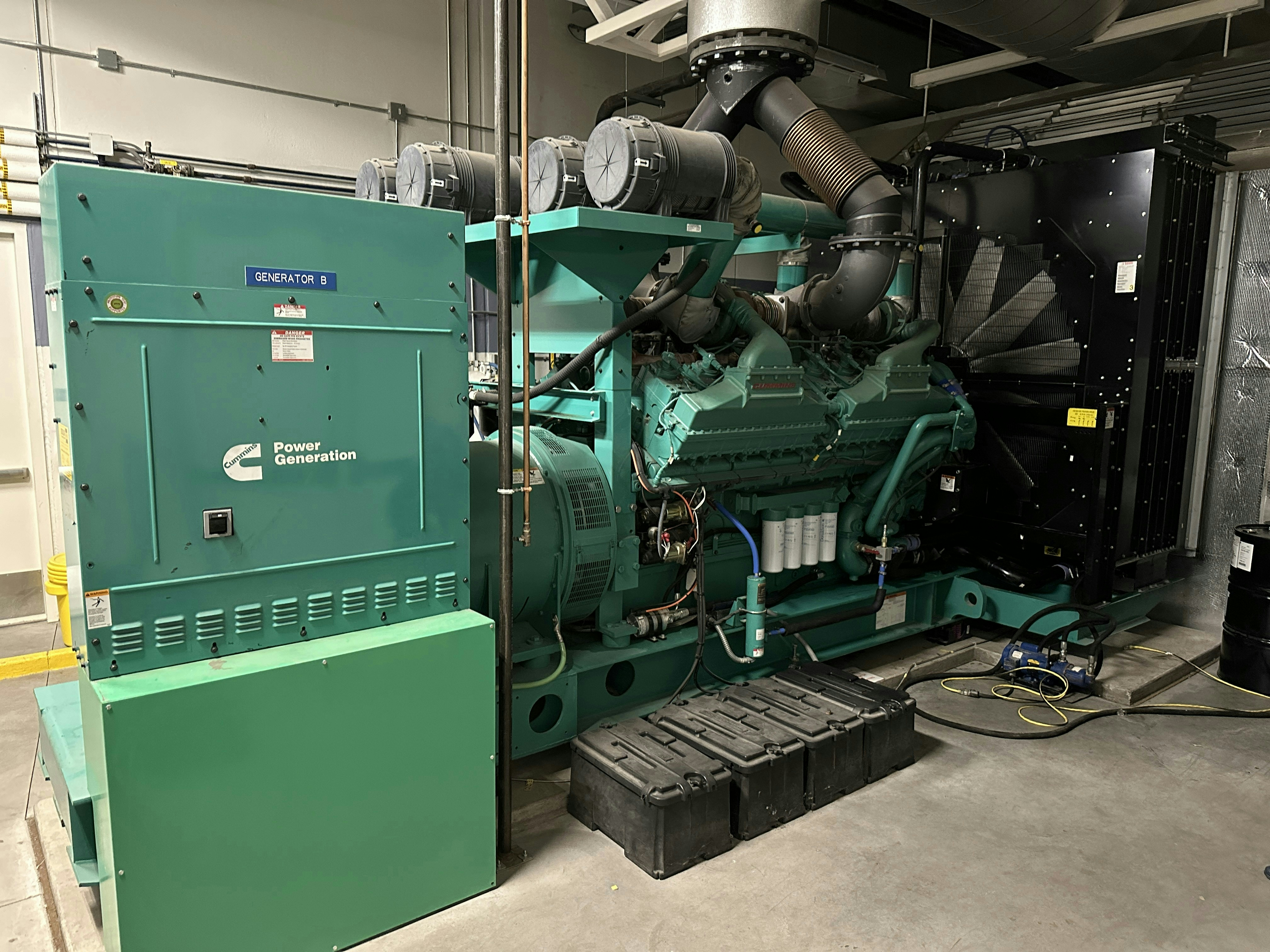
Diesel-powered generator of a hospital data center

Power supplies, either back up or continuous onsite power, consist of one or more uninterruptible power supplies, battery banks, diesel, gas turbine, and/or gas engine generating sets. Greater primary fuel energy efficiency can be achieved with the use of cogeneration technology, generating electricity, heating, and cooling onsite.

To prevent single points of failure, all elements of the electrical systems, including backup systems, are typically given redundant copies, and critical servers are connected to both the A-side and B-side power feeds. This arrangement is often made to achieve N+1 redundancy in the systems. Static transfer switches are sometimes used to ensure instantaneous switchover from one supply to the other in the event of a power failure.

=== Low-voltage cable routing ===
Options for low-voltage cable routing might include data cabling that is routed through overhead cable trays; raised floor cabling, both for security reasons and to avoid the extra cost of cooling systems over the racks; and anti-static tiles for flooring, especially in low-cost data centers.

=== Environmental control ===
Maintaining suitable temperature and humidity levels is critical to preventing equipment damage caused by overheating. Overheating can cause components (usually the silicon or copper in wires or circuits) to melt, leading to loose connections and fire hazards. Typical temperature control methods include air conditioning and indirect cooling, such as the use of outside air, indirect evaporative cooling units, and seawater cooling.

Airflow management is the practice of achieving data center cooling efficiency by preventing the recirculation of hot exhaust air and by reducing bypass airflow. Common approaches include hot-aisle/cold-aisle containment and the deployment of in-row cooling units, which position cooling directly between server racks to intercept exhaust heat before it mixes with room air.

Humidity control prevents moisture and related issues. For example, excess humidity can cause dust to adhere more readily to fan blades and heat sinks, impeding air cooling and leading to higher temperatures.

==== Aisle containment ====
Cold aisle containment is done by exposing the rear of equipment racks, while the fronts of the servers are enclosed with doors and covers. This is similar to how large-scale food companies refrigerate and store products.

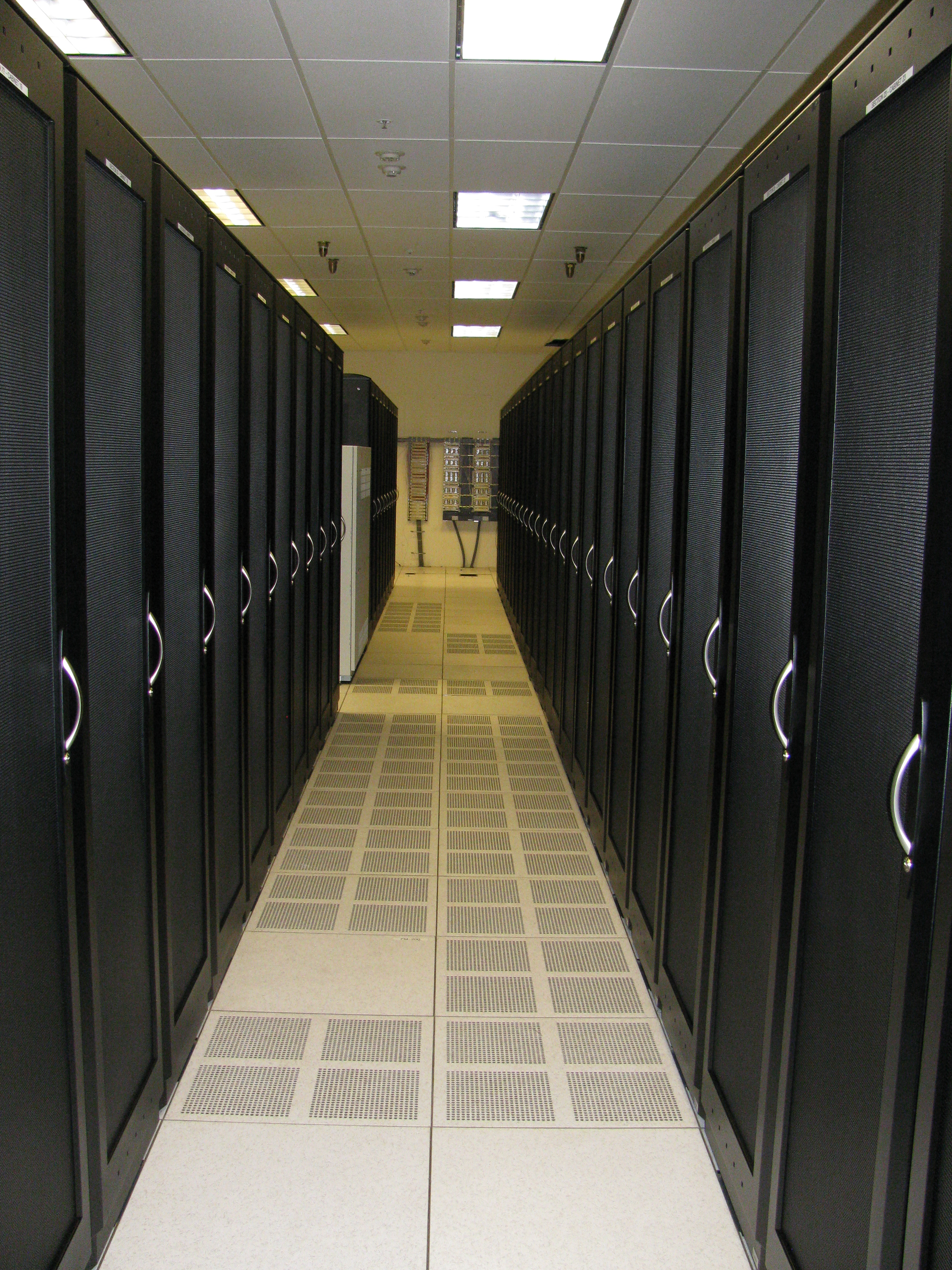
Typical cold aisle configuration with server rack fronts facing each other and cold air distributed through the raised floor

Computer cabinets/server farms are often organized for containment of hot/cold aisles. Proper air duct placement prevents cold and hot air from mixing. Rows of cabinets are paired to face each other so that the cool and hot air intakes and exhausts do not mix, which would severely reduce cooling efficiency.

Alternatively, a range of underfloor panels can create efficient cold air pathways directed to the raised-floor vented tiles. Either the cold aisle or the hot aisle can be contained.

Another option is fitting cabinets with vertical exhaust duct chimneys. Hot exhaust pipes/vents/ducts can direct the air into a plenum space above a dropped ceiling and back to the cooling units or to outside vents. With this configuration, a traditional hot/cold aisle configuration is not required.

=== Fire protection ===
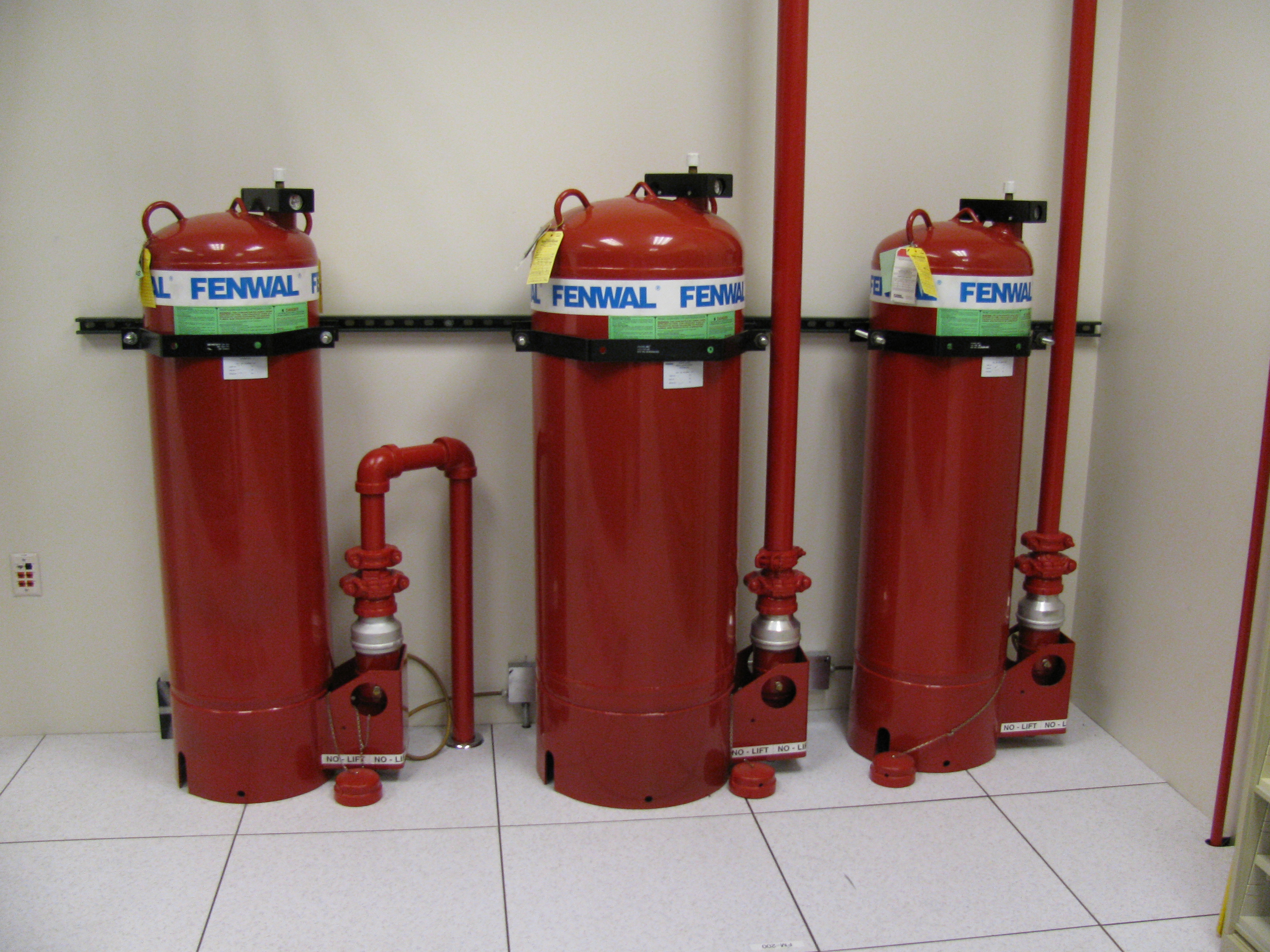
FM200 fire suppression tanks

Data centers feature fire protection systems, including passive and active design elements, as well as implementation of fire prevention programs in operations. Smoke detectors are usually installed to provide early warning of a fire.

Although the main room usually does not allow a wet pipe sprinkler system due to the fragile nature of printed circuit boards, some systems can be used in the rest of the facility or in cold/hot aisle air circulation systems that are closed systems. These include fire sprinkler systems and misting, the latter of which uses high pressure to create extremely small water droplets and can be used in sensitive rooms because of their size.

However, there are other means to put out fires, especially in sensitive areas, usually using gaseous fire suppression, of which Halon gas was the most popular until the negative effects of producing and using it were discovered.

=== Security ===
Physical access to data centers is usually restricted. Layered security often starts with fencing, bollards, and mantraps. Video camera surveillance and permanent security guards are almost always present if the data center is large or contains sensitive information. Fingerprint recognition is becoming commonplace.

Logging access is required by some data protection regulations; some organizations tightly integrate it with access control systems. Multiple log entries can occur at the main entrance, entrances to internal rooms, and at equipment cabinets. Access control at cabinets can be integrated with intelligent power distribution units, so locks are networked through the same appliance.

=== Transformation ===
Data center transformation takes a step-by-step approach through integrated projects carried out over time. This differs from a traditional method of data center upgrades, which takes a serial and siloed approach. Typical projects within a data center transformation initiative include standardization/consolidation, virtualization, automation, and security.

Data center consolidation consists of reducing the number of data centers and avoiding server sprawl (both physical and virtual), which often includes replacing aging data center equipment. This process is aided by standardization, which ensures these systems follow a uniform set of configurations, simplifying and improving efficiency. Automating tasks such as provisioning, configuration, patching, release management, and compliance are other ways in which data centers can be upgraded. These changes are needed not just when facing a shortage of skilled IT workers. Lastly, security initiatives integrate the protection of virtual systems with existing security for physical infrastructures.

=== Raised floor ===
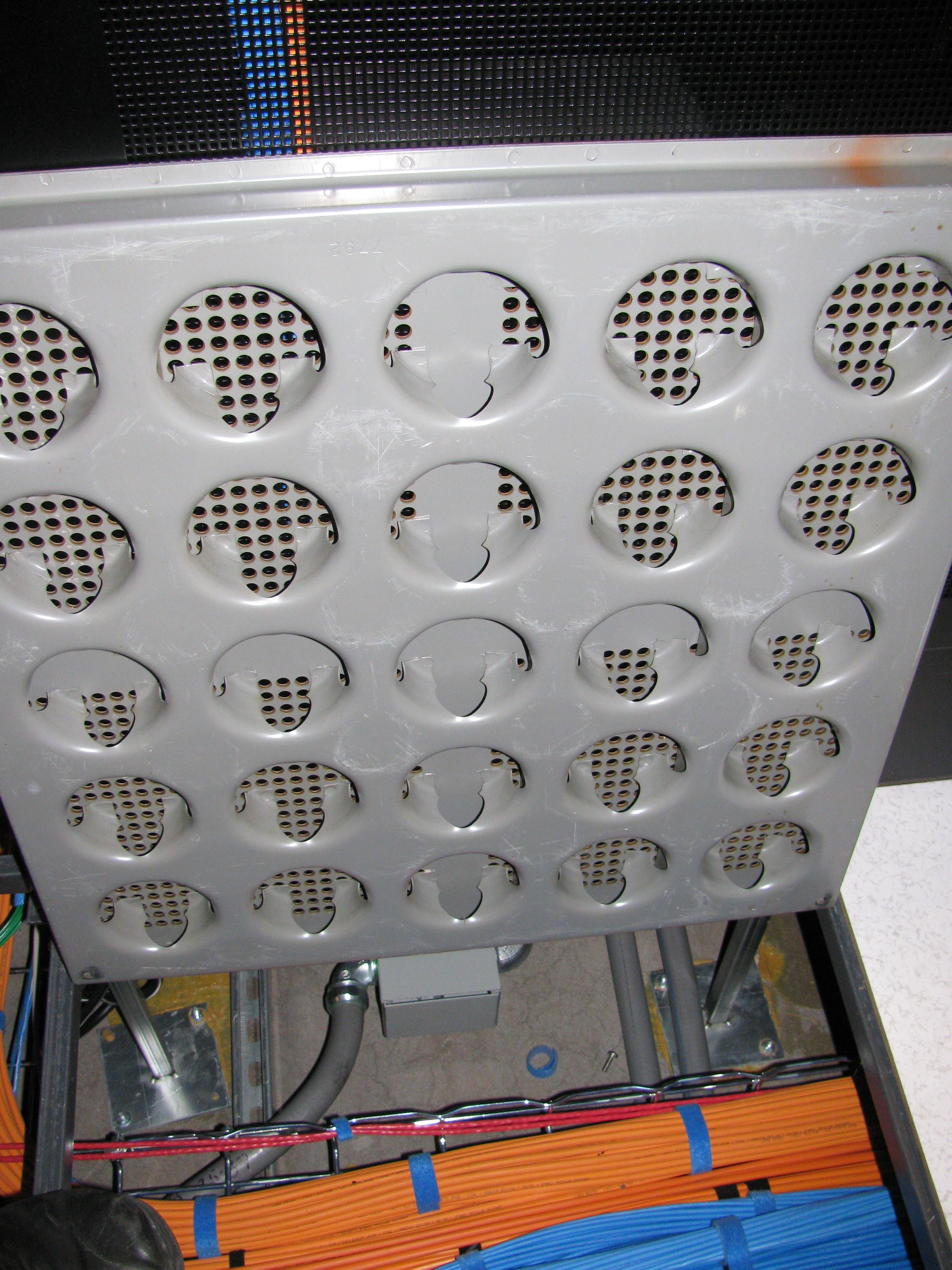
Perforated cooling floor tile

The first raised floor computer room was made by IBM in 1956 to allow access for wiring. During the 1970s, raised floors became more common because they allow cool air to circulate more efficiently. A raised floor standards guide (GR-2930) was developed by Telcordia Technologies, a subsidiary of Ericsson.

=== Lights out ===
The "lights-out" data center, also known as a darkened or dark data center, is a data center that has largely eliminated the need for direct access by personnel, except under extraordinary circumstances. Because staff do not need to enter the data center, it can be operated without lighting. All of the devices are accessed and managed by remote systems, with automation programs used to perform unattended operations. In addition to energy savings, reduced staffing costs, and the ability to locate the site farther from population centers, implementing a lights-out data center also reduces the threat of malicious attacks on the infrastructure.

=== Noise levels ===
Generally, local authorities prefer noise levels at data centers to be "10 dB below the existing night-time background noise level at the nearest residence."

Occupational Safety and Health Administration (OSHA) regulations require monitoring of noise levels inside data centers if noise exceeds 85 decibels. The average noise level in server areas of a data center may reach as high as 92–96 dB(A).

Residents living near data centers have described the sound as "a high-pitched whirring noise 24/7", saying "It's like being on a tarmac with an airplane engine running constantly ... Except that the airplane keeps idling and never leaves."

External sources of noise include heating, ventilation, and air conditioning equipment and energy generators.

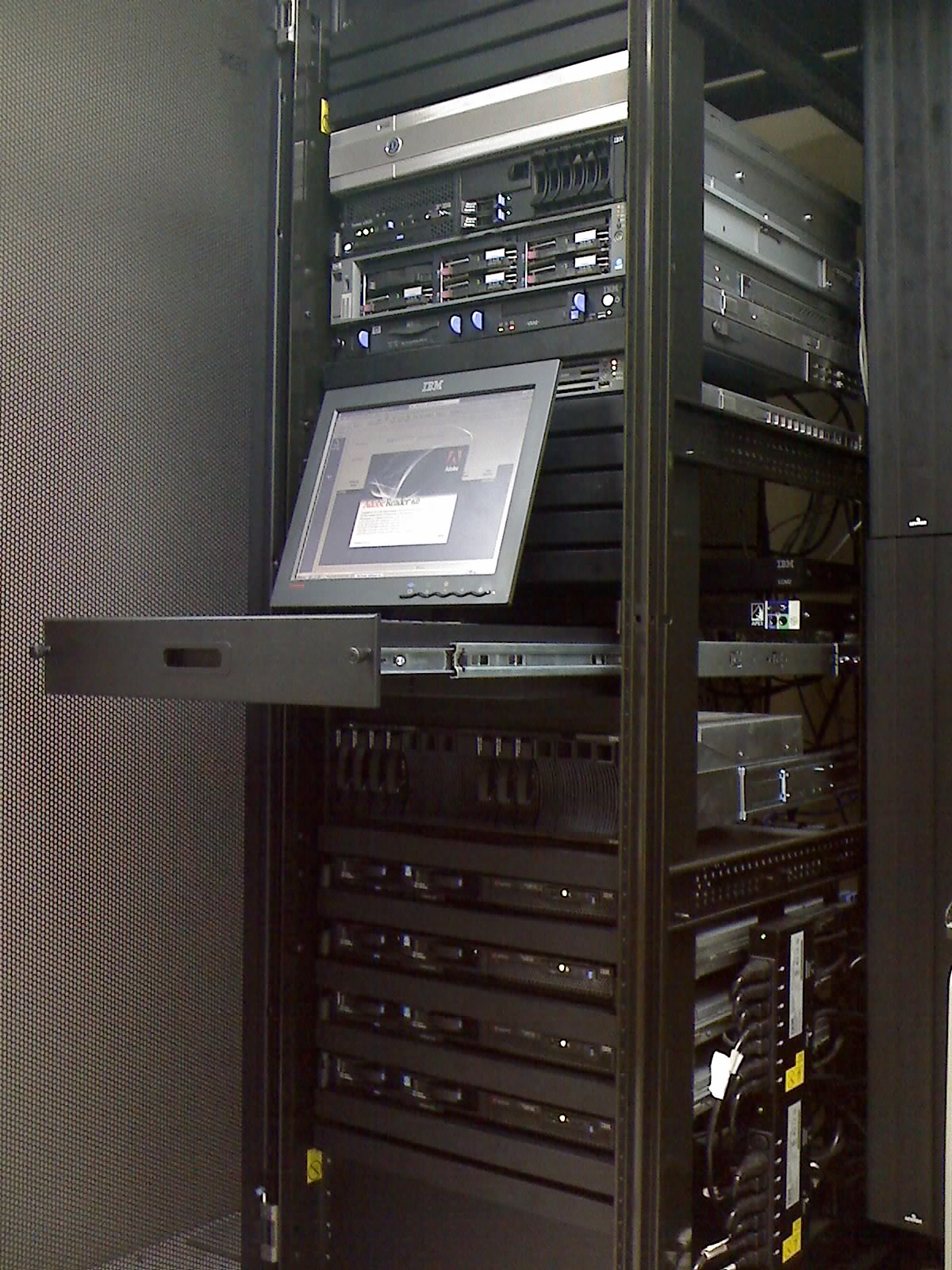
A typical server rack, commonly seen in colocation

=== Site selection ===
Location factors include proximity to power grids, telecommunications infrastructure, networking services, transportation lines, and emergency services. Other considerations should include flight paths, neighboring power drains, geological risks, and climate (associated with cooling costs).

Local political considerations, such as availability of subsidies and lack of opposition, are also important factors in locating data centers.

=== High availability ===
Various metrics exist to measure the data-availability that results from data-center availability beyond 95% uptime, with the top of the scale counting how many nines can be placed after 99%. The costs of avoiding downtime should not exceed the cost of the downtime itself.

=== Dynamic infrastructure ===
Dynamic infrastructure provides the ability to intelligently, automatically, and securely move workloads within a data center anytime, anywhere, for migrations, provisioning, to enhance performance, or build colocation centre facilities. It also facilitates performing routine maintenance on either physical or virtual systems, all while minimizing interruption. A related concept is Composable Infrastructure, which allows dynamic reconfiguration of available resources to suit needs only when needed.

Side benefits include:

- reducing cost
- facilitating business continuity and high availability
- enabling cloud and grid computing.

=== Network infrastructure ===
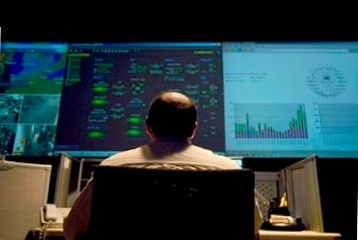
An operation engineer overseeing a network operations control room of a data center (2006)

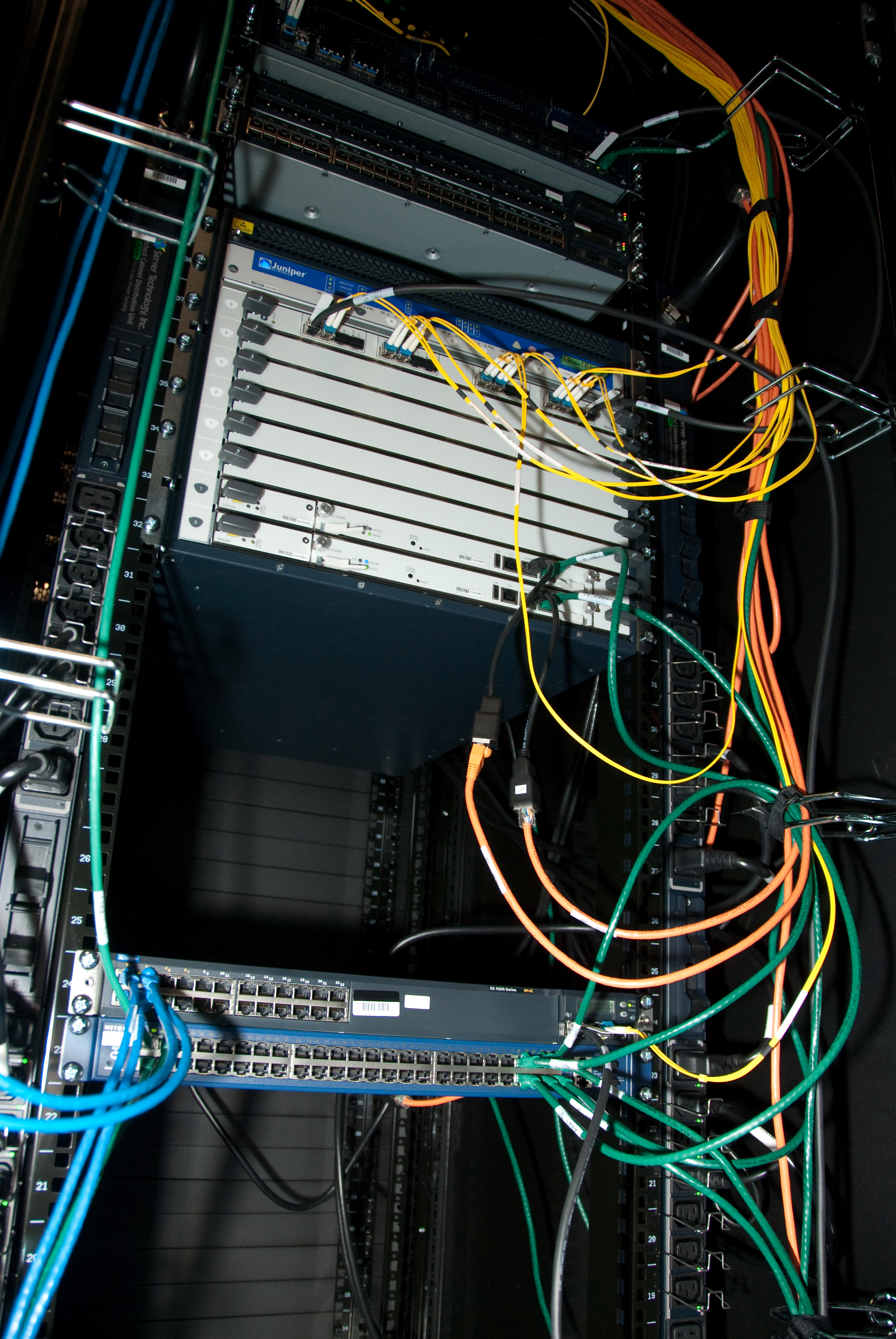
An example of network infrastructure of a data center

Communications in modern data centers are most often based on networks running the Internet protocol suite. Data centers contain a set of routers and switches that transport traffic between the servers and to the outside world, which are connected according to the data center network architecture. Redundancy of the internet connection is often provided by using two or more upstream service providers. Some of the servers at a data center are used for running the basic internet and intranet services needed by internal users in the organization (e.g., e-mail servers, proxy servers, and DNS servers).

Network security elements are also usually deployed: firewalls, VPN gateways, intrusion detection systems, and so on. Also common are monitoring systems for the network and for some applications. Additional off-site monitoring systems are also typical in case of a communications failure inside the data center.

== Energy use and environmental impact ==
Fueled by growth in artificial intelligence, data centers' demand for power increased in the 2020s.

Share of total electricity demand used by data centers (2025)

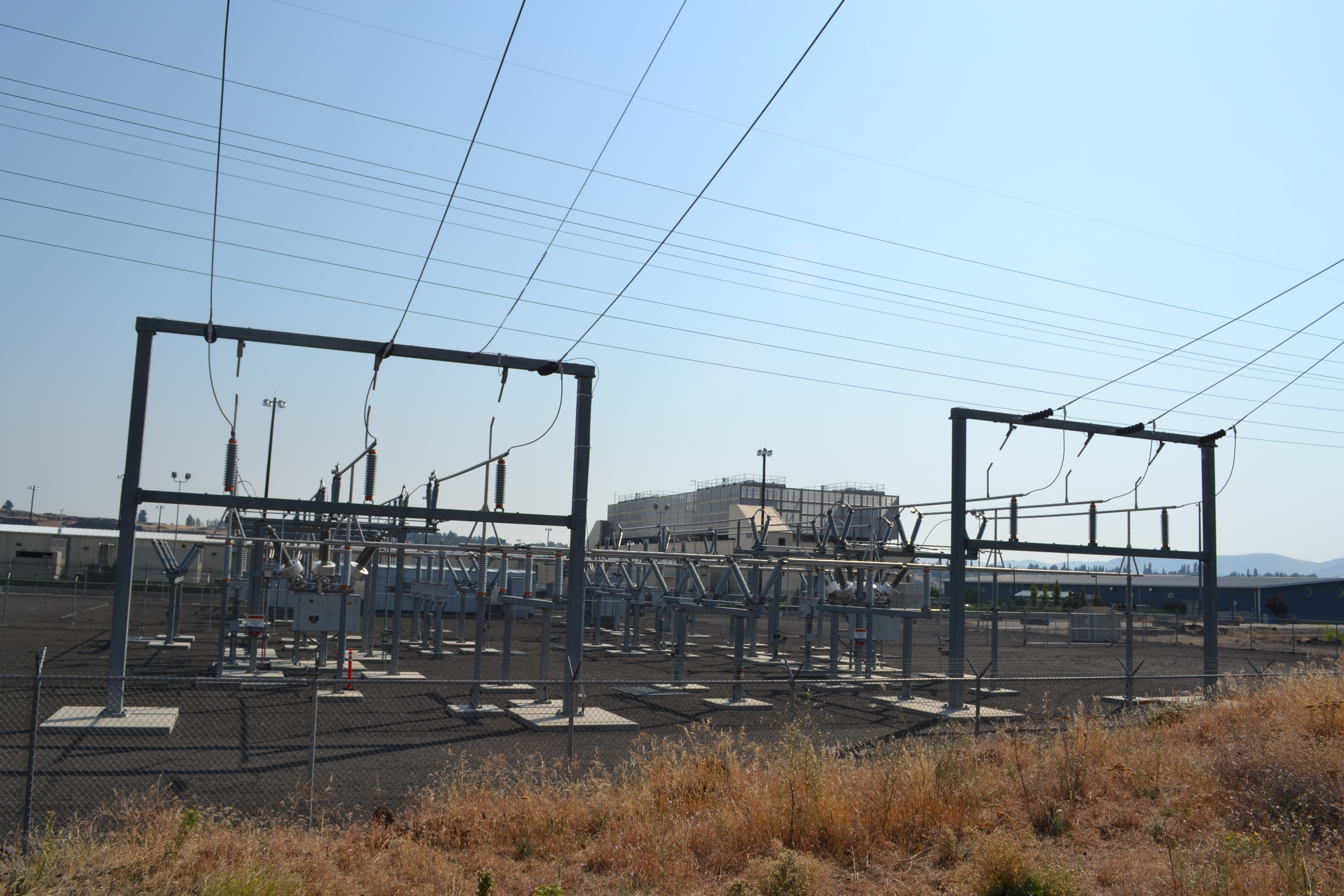
Google Data Center, The Dalles, Oregon

Energy consumption and the environmental impacts it creates are a central issue for data centers. Power draw ranges from a few kilowatts (kW) for small server racks to several tens of megawatts (MW) for large facilities. Modern hyperscale data centers can exhibit power densities exceeding 100 times those of conventional office buildings, primarily due to the high concentration of servers and cooling systems required to manage continuous digital workloads. For higher power density facilities, electricity costs are a dominant operating expense and account for over 10% of the total cost of ownership (TCO) of a data center.

As of 2024, data centers in the U.S. are primarily powered by natural gas, which supplies 40% of their electricity (with renewable energy at 24%, nuclear at about 20%, and coal at about 15%). The Associated Press reported that electricity for AI data centers in the U.S. would likely come from natural gas or oil, as companies prefer using currently available power plants, which primarily use fossil fuels. Fossil energy is also often cheaper in locations where data centers are developed, and experts believe that energy demands from generative AI and data centers would be difficult to fulfill with renewable energy alone. Some companies such as Google, Amazon, and Meta have expressed interest in nuclear power for their data centers. As of 2020, according to the IEA, solar photovoltaic-generated electricity is at its lowest cost in history. Other data centers, including xAI's Colossus, OpenAI's Stargate, and Meta's Prometheus use their own off-grid natural gas plants. Electric vehicle and lithium-ion batteries have also been used for powering data centers, including for Colossus.

Power utility companies upgrade their infrastructure to handle the demands of new data centers, and the cost of these changes typically falls on residential or smaller commercial consumers. In 2025, the Mountain Valley Pipeline announced plans to expand its capacity by 25% to meet energy needs for data centers.

In December 2025, the Federal Energy Regulatory Commission (FERC) issued a unanimous order allowing data centers in the U.S. to connect directly to power plants. United States Secretary of Energy Chris Wright expressed support for un-retiring coal plants to power AI data centers. Electricity demands from AI data centers have slowed or reversed the retirement of peaking power plants in the U.S. For example, in 2025, Southern Company announced that energy use from data centers would prevent the company from retiring coal-fired power plants as it had earlier promised. In Nevada, the Desert Research Institute (DRI) calculated that 35% of the state's energy production could go to data centers by the year 2030 if all projects planned in the state as of 2026 are completed. DRI also stated, in areas where there are clusters of data centers, local consumers may end up paying the extra cost of expanding infrastructure.

=== Water footprint ===
The rapid expansion of AI data centers has raised significant concerns over their water footprint, particularly in drought-prone regions. According to the IEA, a single 100-megawatt data center, using 2400 MWh of electricity per day, can use up to 2,000,000 litres (530,000 US gal) of water per day. The electricity use is equivalent to that of 60,000–120,000 households in the U.S., while water use is equivalent about 6,500 households. Water usage can be divided into three categories: on-site (direct usage from data centers), off-site (indirect usage from electricity), and supply-chain (water usage from manufacturing processes).

On-site water use refers to the direct water used by the data center for the cooling of its equipment. Water is used specifically for space humidification (adding moisture to the air), evaporative cooling systems (cooling air before entering server rooms), and cooling towers (removing heat from the facility).

Off-site water use is the indirect water usage from the electricity generated for data centers. It is estimated that 56% of U.S. data centers' electricity comes from fossil fuels in thermal power stations, which use water to generate power via steam.

Lastly, data centers consume water through the process of AI chip and server manufacturing. These chips, specifically, consume a vast amount of ultrapure water for fabrication and cooling of semiconductor plants. While this scope of water usage is not as significant as on-site and off-site water usage, it is still a contributing factor.

The water footprint of a data center depends heavily on its cooling design, local climate and electricity supply. Evaporative cooling uses less electricity but consumes water on site, whereas air-cooled and closed-loop systems consume little water directly but require more power, which increases the water consumed at the thermoelectric power plants supplying the grid. The International Energy Agency has estimated that a 100 MW data center in the United States consumes roughly 2 million litres of water per day when averaged across cooling types, of which less than 40% is consumed on site and the remainder in electricity generation. A 2026 modelling study by researchers at the University of Michigan found that switching a hypothetical facility from water-cooled to air-cooled chillers reduced total water consumption by 44%, but shifted most of the remaining footprint to power plants elsewhere on the grid. A 2026 review in Next Sustainability concluded that direct liquid cooling offers the most favourable published combination of energy and water performance, while noting that most supporting figures come from simulations and vendor data rather than independent field measurements.

Globally, since 2022, more than two-thirds of new data centers have been built in water-stressed areas, including Texas, Arizona, Saudi Arabia, and India, where freshwater scarcity is already a critical issue. The global water footprint of data centers is estimated at 560 billion litres (150×10^{9} US gal) annually, a figure projected to double by 2030 due to increasing AI demand. Another 2026 global study of 9,347 identified data centers estimated that 25% would have experienced at least one month of water-gap conditions annually under 2001–2010 hydrological conditions, increasing to 33% under projected future hydrological conditions.

In regions like Aragon, Spain, Amazon's planned data centers are licensed to withdraw 755,720 cubic metres (612.67 acre⋅ft) of water per year, sparking conflicts with farmers who rely on the same dwindling supplies.

=== Greenhouse gas emissions ===
In 2024, data centers were estimated to account for about 1.5% of global electricity consumption (approximately 415 TWh) and around 1% of greenhouse gas emissions according to U.S. Environmental Protection Agency (EPA). However, the rapid expansion is causing projections to rise sharply. Due to accelerated demand from AI, global data center electricity consumption is projected to more than double to around 945 TWh by 2030 in the IEA's base-case scenario, representing just under 3% of 2030 total global electricity consumption. This growing electricity demand, much of which is still generated by fossil fuels, increases the potential environmental impacts. In addition to operational energy demand, embodied life cycle emissions should be considered, which include the extraction, manufacturing, transportation, and recycling or disposal of materials used in the construction of facilities and hardware.

Global data center carbon dioxide emissions are projected to rise from an estimated 220 million tonnes in 2024 to 300–320 million tonnes by 2035. In 2024, Google and Microsoft each consumed 24 TWh – more than many countries. As a result, there is increasing industry pressure for decarbonization. Companies are pursuing direct clean energy agreements, such as Tencent who has pledged to be carbon neutral by 2030, and Microsoft's 2024 agreement to re-open the Three Mile Island nuclear power plant to provide 100% of the electric power for its AI data centers for 20 years.

A November 2026 study published in Nature Sustainability found that US hyperscale data centers produce carbon emissions equivalent to those produced by the entire country of Denmark.

=== Economic analysis of energy use ===
==== Energy efficiency and overhead ====
The most commonly used energy-efficiency metric for data centers is power usage effectiveness (PUE), calculated as the ratio of total power entering the data center to the power used by IT equipment.

PUE = (Total Facility Power)/(IT Equipment Power) = 1 + (Non IT Facility Energy)/(IT Equipment Energy)

PUE measures the ratio of total data center power consumption to the power used by IT equipment, including the additional power required for cooling, lighting, and other supporting systems.The average U.S. data center has a PUE of 2.0, meaning two watts of total power (overhead + IT equipment) for every watt delivered to IT equipment. State-of-the-art data centers are estimated to have a PUE of roughly 1.2. Google publishes quarterly efficiency metrics from its data centers in operation. PUEs of as low as 1.01 have been achieved with two-phase immersion cooling.

The EPA has an Energy Star rating for standalone or large data centers. To qualify for the ecolabel, a data center must be within the top quartile in energy efficiency of all reported facilities. The Energy Efficiency Improvement Act of 2015 (U.S.) requires federal facilities—including data centers—to operate more efficiently. California's Title 24 (2014) of the California Code of Regulations mandates that every newly constructed data center have some form of airflow containment to optimize energy efficiency.

The European Union (EU) also has a similar initiative: EU Code of Conduct for Data Centres.

Efficiency improvements and renewable energy integration are helping to offset some emissions, but fossil fuels remain a major source of electricity for data center operations worldwide.

In 2011, server racks in data centers were designed for more than 25 kW, and the typical server was estimated to waste about 30% of the electricity it consumed. The energy demand for information storage systems is also rising. A high-availability data center is estimated to have a 1 MW demand and consume $20 million in electricity over its lifetime, with cooling accounting for 35% to 45% of the data center's total cost of ownership. Calculations show that in two years, the cost of powering and cooling a server could be equal to the cost of purchasing the server hardware. Research in 2018 showed that a substantial amount of energy could still be conserved by optimizing IT refresh rates and increasing server use. Research for optimizing task scheduling is also underway, with researchers looking to implement energy-efficient scheduling algorithms that could reduce energy consumption by anywhere between 6% and 44%.

The International Energy Agency has estimated that the energy efficiency of AI-related computer chips improved more than 100-fold between 2008 and 2023.

In 2011, Facebook, Rackspace, and others founded the Open Compute Project (OCP) to develop and publish open standards for greener data center computing technologies. As part of the project, Facebook published the designs of its server, which it had built for its first dedicated data center in Prineville. Making servers taller left space for more effective heat sinks and enabled the use of fans that moved more air with less energy. By not buying commercial off-the-shelf servers, energy consumption from unnecessary expansion slots on the motherboard and unneeded components, such as a graphics card, was also reduced. In 2016, Google joined the project and published the designs of its 48V DC shallow data center rack. This design had long been part of Google data centers. By eliminating the multiple transformers usually deployed in data centers, Google had achieved a 30% increase in energy efficiency. In 2017, sales for data center hardware built to OCP designs topped $1.2 billion and are expected to reach $6 billion by 2021.

==== Power and cooling analysis ====
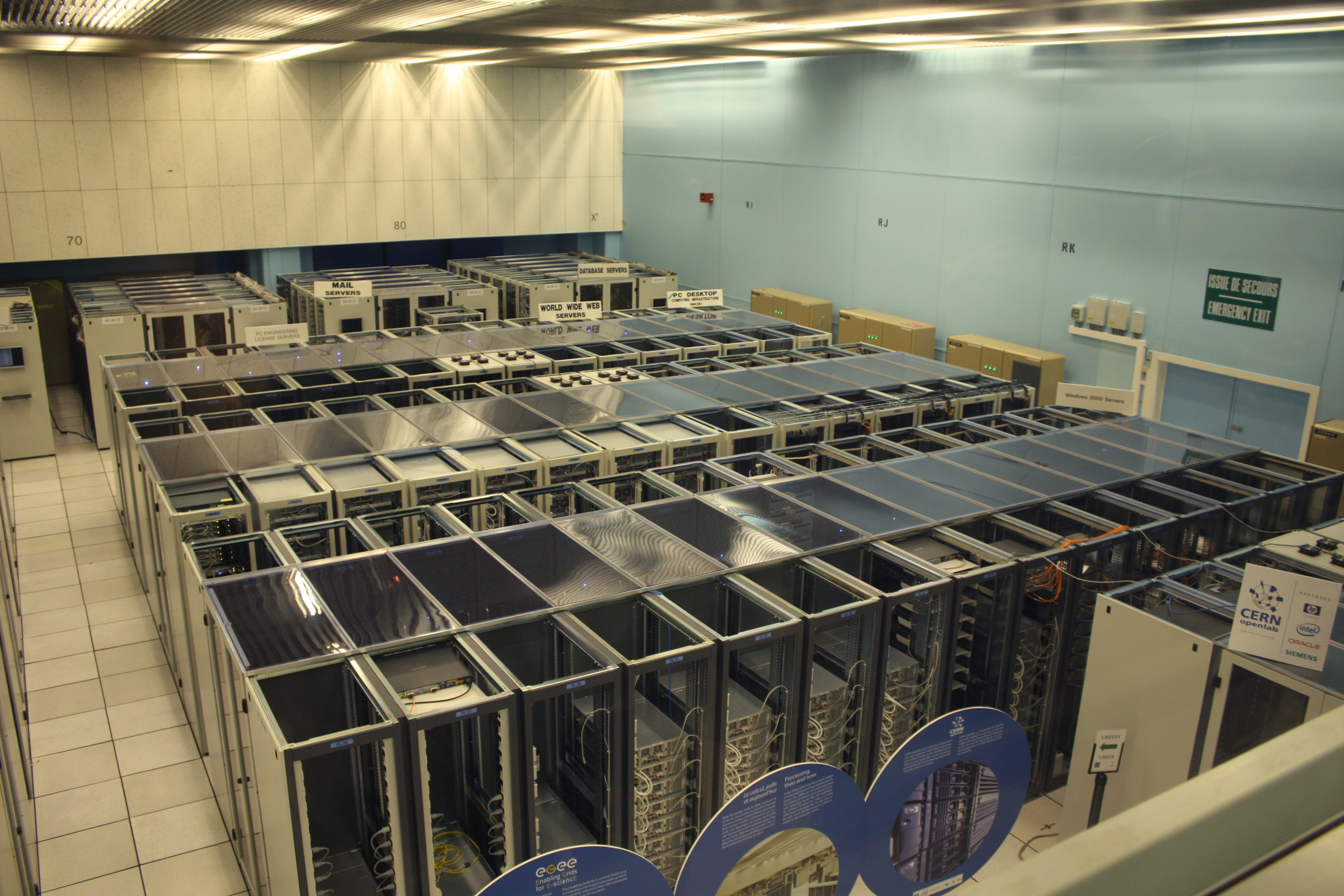
Data center at CERN (2010)

Power is the largest recurring cost to the user of a data center. In 2008, the ASHRAE recommended a temperature range of 64.4 °F (18.0 °C) to 80.6 °F (27.0 °C), though some data centers could operate at higher temperatures. However, cooling at or below 70 °F (21 °C) wastes money and energy. Furthermore, overcooling equipment in environments with a high relative humidity can expose equipment to a high amount of moisture that facilitates the growth of salt deposits on conductive filaments in the circuitry.

A power and cooling analysis, also referred to as a thermal assessment, measures the relative temperatures in specific areas as well as the capacity of the cooling systems to handle specific ambient temperatures. A power and cooling analysis can help identify hot spots, over-cooled areas that can handle greater power use density, the breakpoint of equipment loading, the effectiveness of a raised-floor strategy, and optimal equipment positioning (such as AC units) to balance temperatures across the data center. Power cooling density is a measure of how much square footage the center can cool at maximum capacity. The cooling of data centers is the second largest power consumer after servers, with cooling taking about 7% to 30% of energy usage (depending on efficiency), compared to an average of 60% of energy used by servers.

==== Energy efficiency analysis ====
An energy efficiency analysis measures the energy use of data center IT and facilities equipment. A typical energy efficiency analysis measures factors such as a data center's Power Use Effectiveness (PUE) against industry standards, identifies mechanical and electrical sources of inefficiency, and identifies air-management metrics. However, the limitation of most current metrics and approaches is they do not include IT in the analysis. Case studies have shown that by addressing energy efficiency holistically in a data center, major efficiencies can be achieved that are not possible otherwise.

==== Computational fluid dynamics (CFD) analysis ====
Computational fluid dynamics (CFD) analysis uses sophisticated tools and techniques to understand the unique thermal conditions present in each data center—predicting the temperature, airflow, and pressure behavior of a data center to assess performance and energy consumption using numerical modeling. By predicting the effects of these environmental conditions, CFD analysis can be used to predict the impact of high-density racks mixed with low-density racks and the onward impact on cooling resources, poor infrastructure management practices, and AC failure or AC shutdown for scheduled maintenance.

==== Thermal zone mapping ====
Thermal zone mapping uses sensors and computer modeling to create a three-dimensional image of the hot and cool zones in a data center. This information can help identify optimal positioning of data center equipment. For example, critical servers might be placed in a cool zone that is serviced by redundant AC units.

==== Green data centers ====
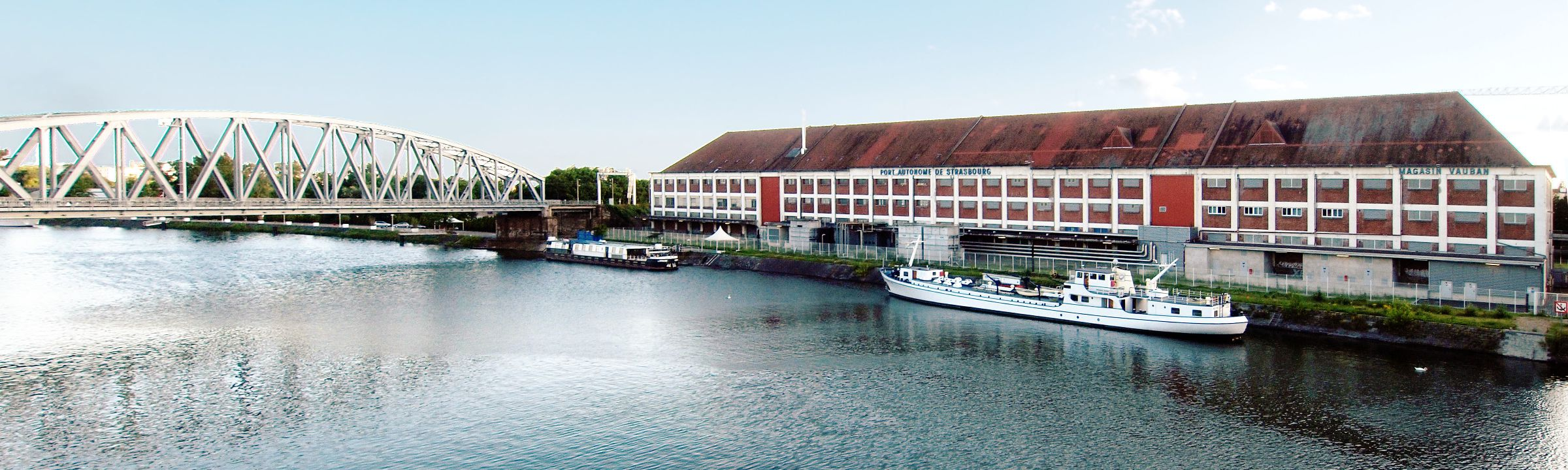
This water-cooled data center in the Port of Strasbourg, France, claims the attribute green.

Data centers consume large amounts of power, split between two main uses: running the equipment and cooling it. Power efficiency reduces the first category.

Cooling cost reduction through natural means includes location decisions. When the focus is on avoiding good fiber connectivity, power grid connections, and people concentrations for equipment management, a data center can be miles away from users. Mass data centers like Google or Facebook do not need to be near population centers. Arctic locations that can use outside air for cooling are becoming more popular. Countries with favorable conditions, such as Canada, Finland, Sweden, Norway, and Switzerland are trying to attract cloud computing data centers.

Singapore lifted a three-year ban on new data centers in April 2022. A major data center hub for the Asia-Pacific region, Singapore lifted its moratorium on new data center projects in 2022, granting four new projects, but rejecting more than 16 data center applications from over 20 received. Singapore's new data centers will meet very strict green technology criteria, including "Water Usage Effectiveness (WUE) of 2.0/MWh, Power Usage Effectiveness (PUE) of less than 1.3, and have a "Platinum certification under Singapore's BCA-IMDA Green Mark for New Data Centre" criteria that clearly addressed decarbonization and use of hydrogen cells or solar panels.

==== Energy reuse ====
It is very difficult to reuse the heat generated by air-cooled data centers. For this reason, data center infrastructures are more often equipped with heat pumps.

== Power infrastructure ==
The rapid growth of artificial intelligence (AI) and high-performance computing workloads has increased attention on data center power infrastructure, particularly the relationship between electrical reliability, deployment timelines, energy costs, and decarbonization objectives. Industry publications have described phased approaches to infrastructure development that enable operators to deploy power capacity rapidly while maintaining pathways toward lower-carbon energy systems as technologies, fuel availability, grid capacity, and economics evolve.

Recent industry discussion has also emphasized "speed-to-power" as a significant consideration in data center development, reflecting the growing importance of securing electrical capacity and resilient power systems within increasingly compressed project timelines.

Morgan Stanley predicts that hi-tech firms will have invested up to $3 trillion, through 2028, building and equipping new data centers, as they compete to generate AI computing power. The cost of that equipment more than tripled between January 2023 and October 2026.

An analysis by Lawrence Berkeley National Laboratory of U.S. retail electricity prices between 2019 and 2025 found that the main drivers of price increases were utility investment in grid infrastructure, natural gas prices, recovery from natural disasters and state energy policies, and did not identify data centers as a major influence on prices in most of the country. States with the largest data center demand growth generally saw price decreases over the period, although some saw increases, and it remains unclear whether the pattern will continue. A growing number of state utility regulators have adopted large-load tariffs or separate customer classes intended to assign the cost of grid upgrades required by data centers to those customers rather than to other ratepayers.

Some data centers generate off-grid electricity, with time pressure leading some to turn to more highly polluting options. Two xAI data centers in Tennessee violated EPA rules with portable natural gas generators without a permit. More-polluting jet engines have also been removed from disused aircraft for data center use.

== Socioeconomic impacts ==
Data centers have significant impacts on local ecologies, politics, and utility infrastructure. A report from CIT and UC Riverside suggests data centers by 2030 could contribute to $20 million of healthcare costs and 1,300 premature deaths. Political and economic incentives such as tax breaks, land deals, or government subsidies drive data center growth in areas where these incentives are available. Data centers are frequently located in rural areas, where they may displace agriculture.

Burdens on supply chains, air quality, and the buildup of e-waste can increase environmental and economic injustice if supply centers are located in already marginalized and burdened communities. Multiple studies and experts have found that data centers do not bring high-paying jobs to local communities in proportion to the tax subsidies they receive.

Jobs created by data centers vary significantly by project type, phase and region. A study found the productivity increases enabled by data centers are multiple times larger than gross external damages. Construction phases generate larger but temporary workforces, while operational roles tend to be fewer but more specialized. JLARC audit of Virginia's data center industry reported approximately 74,000 direct and indirect jobs and $9.1 billion in gross state product attributable to the sector Critics nonetheless argue that permanent employment figures are low relative to the scale of tax subsidies received, a tension that has driven several states to reassess their incentive structures.

In 2026, it was reported that data centers were becoming a target of organized crime, in which thieves were stealing copper and data center equipment from construction sites and selling them on the black market. In July 2026, authorities in Illinois recovered two trailers carrying $1.3 million worth of stolen equipment that were linked to theft cases in Alabama, Florida, and Wisconsin.

A 2026 systematic review concluded that data centers are a capital-intensive establishment with little labor demand that yield limited economic benefits to local communities while simultaneously increasing pressures on resources and infrastructure.

== Opposition ==
Social mobilizations against data centers help shape the discourse around growth of the industry, raise public awareness of issues data centers present, and may impact public policy. Groups opposed to new data center projects have expressed concern that digital infrastructure exploits local resources 'to the benefit of actors and institutions residing elsewhere'. This may occur when data being processed in a facility belongs to actors in other countries, but local people bear the burdens of water and energy use.

In the U.S., bipartisan community resistance to data center development has grown, with residents voicing concerns about water scarcity, rising utility bills, noise pollution, and urban sprawl. Facilities in rural areas of the U.S. have been focal points for local resistance. Data Center Watch reported that multiple projects collectively worth $64 billion had been stopped or delayed between May 2024 and March 2025. An additional $98 billion worth of projects were blocked or delayed between March and June 2025. A Gallup poll taken in March 2026 reported seven out of ten Americans oppose data center projects in their area, and the most common concerns were impact on resources, electricity costs and quality of life. In August 2026, the National Republican Senatorial Committee issued a memo to AI companies to do whatever it takes to quell the public backlash against data centers, or it could "become a sleeper issue for the entire election cycle."

Outside of the U.S., protests in the Netherlands led to a temporary national ban on new mega-centers in 2022. In Chile, protests by activists to protect water reserves led to Google withdrawing plans to build a data center. In the United Kingdom, "March Against the Machines" protests were held.

Residents have been concerned about air, water, and noise pollution, as well as property devaluation, traffic, and the risk of fires. Other environmental concerns involving AI data centers include e-waste and the embodied energy of construction materials, such as concrete and cement.

In the Philippines, in August 2026, farmers and Indigenous Aeta communities started a petition objecting to the building of data hubs under the Pax Silica initiative, raising issues of potential displacement from ancestral lands, environmental degradation, and negative effects to farmers' livelihoods. Opposition to the initiative have also come from environmental activists, faith groups, and progressive groups. Concerns have been raised on issues concerning agriculture, water, electricity, and national sovereignty.

== Future ==
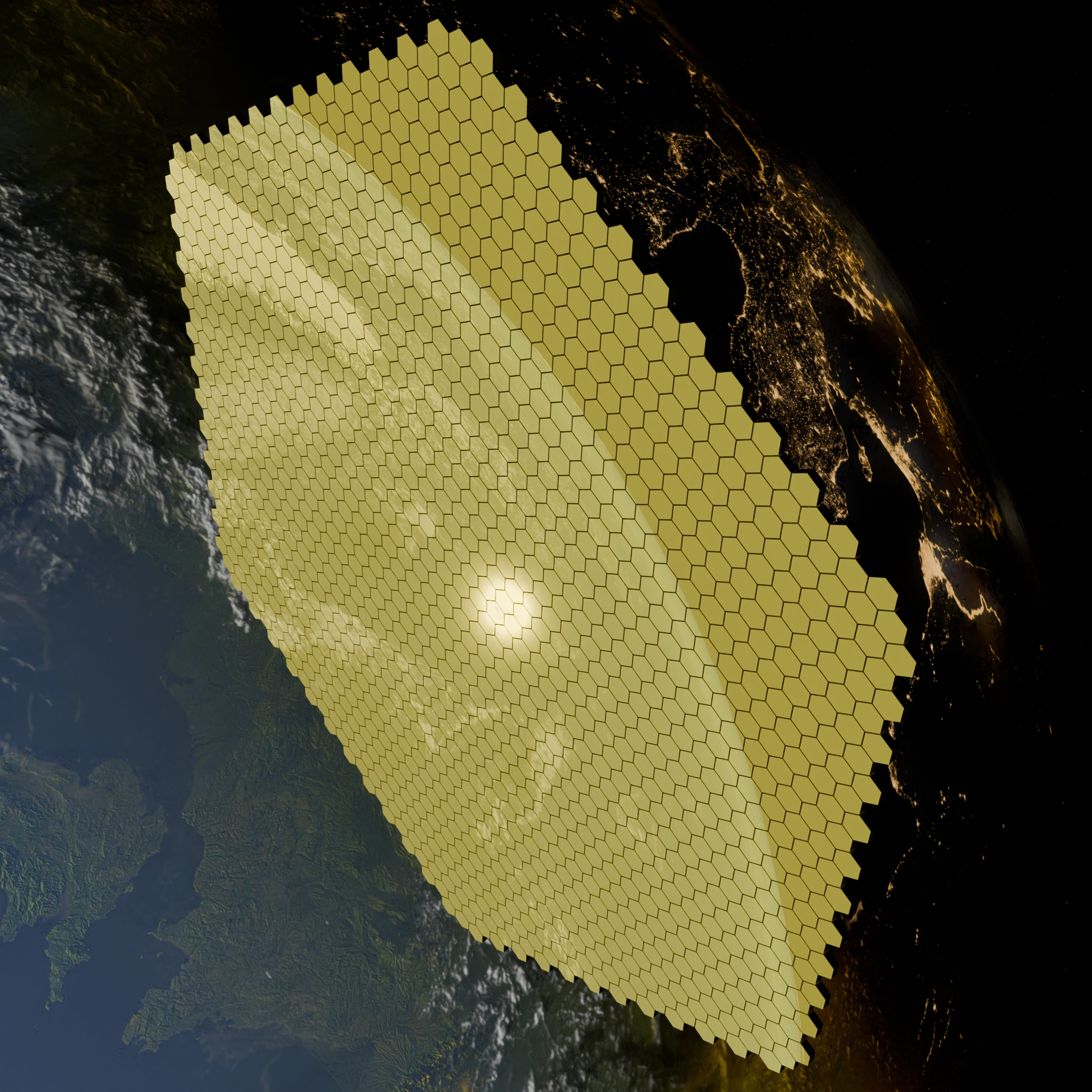
Design of a sun-synchronous orbit data center, they would orbit above the dawn / dusk transition of the planet.

Sun-synchronous orbit animation of AI supercomputing satellites

Housing data centers in space has been proposed for low Earth orbit (LEO). The theoretical advantages are that of space-based solar power, in addition to aiding in weather forecasting and weather prediction computation from weather satellites, and the ability to freely scale up. However, it is difficult to design cooling systems in space, as convection is not available and sunlight causes large temperature fluctuations. Other challenges include damage from cosmic rays and micrometeorites.

The design and shape of data centers could change rapidly in the not-too-distant future with the advent of new technologies, such as quantum computing, biocomputation, and synthetic DNA data storage, as examples.

== See also ==
- Computer cooling
- Data center management
- Internet exchange point
- Internet hosting service
- Microsoft underwater data center
- Neher–McGrath method
- Network operations center
- Open Compute Project, by Facebook
- Peering
- Server farm
- Server room
