= Kristen Averyt =

American scientist

- Education: Stanford University
- Scientific career
- Thesis: Strontium and calcium in marine barite (2004)

Kristen B. Averyt is a climate scientist known for her work on water resources and climate change. As of 2024 she is the executive vice president of the American Geophysical Union.

== Education and career ==
Averyt received her bachelor's degrees in chemistry and marine science from the University of Miami. She has a master's degree from the University of Otago where she was a Fulbright Fellow who studied chemistry. She earned her Ph.D. from Stanford University in 2004 and then worked as a NOAA Sea Grant Knauss Fellow. Averyt moved to Colorado where she served as the director of the National Oceanic and Atmospheric Administration's Western Water Assessment program. She then became the associate director for science at the University of Colorado Boulder.

== Work ==
Averyt early research examined elemental ratios in marine barite. She was a lead author on the 2007 IPCC Fourth Assessment Report, which she worked on while she was in Colorado. She was one of the scientists who shared the 2007 Nobel Prize with Al Gore. Her work on water resources in the western United States includes explorations of water use by power plants and conditions leading to water stress. From 2017 until 2019 Averyt was the named president of the Desert Research Institute, making her the first woman to hold this position. Subsequently, she moved to the University of Nevada Las Vegas and concurrently worked for the state of Nevada on climate policy and as a climate advisor to Governor Steve Sisolak. In 2023 Averyt was appointed by the White House to serve on issues surrounding drought in the western United States, a position she held until January 2024. In 2024 she was named executive vice president of the American Geophysical Union.

== Selected publications ==
- IPCC (2007). Solomon, S.; Qin, D.; Manning, M.; Chen, Z.; Marquis, M.; Averyt, K.B.; Tignor, M.; Miller, H.L. (eds.). Climate Change 2007: The Physical Science Basis (PDF). Contribution of Working Group I to the Fourth Assessment Report of the Intergovernmental Panel on Climate Change. Cambridge University Press. ISBN 978-0-521-88009-1.
- Averyt, K.; Fisher, J.; Huber-Lee, A.; Lewis, A.; Macknick, J.; Madden, N.; Rogers, J.; Tellinghuisen., S. (2011). Freshwater use by U.S. power plants: Electricity's thirst for a precious resource. A report of the energy and Water in a Warming World initiative (Report). Union of Concerned Scientists.
- Averyt, K; Meldrum, J; Caldwell, P; Sun, G; McNulty, S; Huber-Lee, A; Madden, N (2013-09-01). "Sectoral contributions to surface water stress in the coterminous United States". Environmental Research Letters. 8 (3) 035046. Bibcode:2013ERL.....8c5046A. doi:10.1088/1748-9326/8/3/035046. ISSN 1748-9326.
- Averyt, K; Macknick, J; Rogers, J; Madden, N; Fisher, J; Meldrum, J; Newmark, R (2013-03-01). "Water use for electricity in the United States: an analysis of reported and calculated water use information for 2008". Environmental Research Letters. 8 (1) 015001. Bibcode:2013ERL.....8a5001A. doi:10.1088/1748-9326/8/1/015001. ISSN 1748-9326.
- Averyt, Kristen (2016). "Energy-Water Nexus: Head-On Collision or Near Miss?". American Scientist. 104 (3): 158–165. ISSN 0003-0996. JSTOR 44808922.
