= Margaret Bryan Davis =

American paleoecologist (1931–2024)

- Born: Margaret Bryan; October 23, 1931; Boston, Massachusetts, U.S.
- Died: May 22, 2024 (aged 92); Colorado, U.S.
- Occupations: biologist and paleoecologist
- Known for: work in the study of plant pollen and past vegetation
- Spouse: Rowland Davis

Margaret Bryan Davis (née Margaret Bryan; October 23, 1931 – May 22, 2024) was an American palynologist and paleoecologist, who used pollen data to study the vegetation history of the past 21,000 years (i.e. since the last ice age). She showed conclusively that temperate- and boreal-forest species migrated at different rates and in different directions while forming a changing mosaic of communities. Early in her career, she challenged the standard methods and prevailing interpretations of pollen data and fostered rigorous analysis in palynology. Her work was instrumental in more fully integrating palynology and mainstream ecology. As a leading figure in ecology and paleoecology, she served as president of the Ecological Society of America and the American Quaternary Association and as chair of the Department of Ecology, Evolution and Behavior at the University of Minnesota. In 1982 she was elected to the National Academy of Sciences and, in 1993, she received the Eminent Ecologist Award from the Ecological Society of America.

== Early life and education ==
Davis was born in Boston on October 23, 1931. She spent her childhood and early adolescence in the greater Boston area. She married Rowland Davis in 1956. The couple divorced in 1970.

Davis received a B.A from Radcliffe College (1953), a PhD in biology from Harvard University (1957) and an honorary M.S. from Yale University (1974). During her undergraduate studies at Radcliffe, she took a class on paleobotany which sparked her interest in the field. During her final year at Radcliffe, she received a Fulbright fellowship, which allowed her to travel to Denmark to study at University of Copenhagen under Johannes Iversen of the Geological Survey of Denmark and Greenland in 1953–1954. There she became interested in the vegetational history of the Quaternary period, focusing her research on pollen deposits from Greenland. Her findings were published in her first paper, "Interglacial Pollen Spectra from Greenland", in 1954. For her PhD research under Hugh Raup (forest ecologist), she studied pollen data from cores taken from sites near Harvard Forest in Petersham, Massachusetts. She then obtained a postdoctoral fellowship from the National Science Foundation and worked initially at Harvard before continuing her paleoecological research in the geology department at the California Institute of Technology for two years. She then spent a year at Yale University as a research fellow, studying vegetation composition and pollen sedimentation in lakes. There she introduced the method of studying pollen influx or pollen accumulation rates (number of pollen grains per square centimeter per year) in cores, which was an important advance for interpreting fossil pollen data in terms of changes in past vegetation and past sedimentation conditions.

== Career ==
After her postdoctoral positions at Caltech and Yale, Davis joined the botany department at the University of Michigan in 1961 as a research associate. In 1964 she became an associate research biologist at the university's Great Lakes Research Division, and in 1966 she was appointed an associate professor of zoology. In 1970, she was promoted to full professor. In 1973 Davis returned to Yale to serve as a professor of biology, where she worked until 1976. In 1976, she became a professor and head of the Department of Ecology, Evolution and Behavior at the University of Minnesota. In 1982, she was appointed Regents Professor of Ecology and was made Regents Professor Emeritus in the Department of Ecology, Evolution, and Behavior upon retirement.

Her 1963 paper, "On the Theory of Pollen Analysis", greatly impacted the study of pollen records and their interpretation and led to studies of how well the distribution of a species' pollen reflects the population numbers and spatial distribution of the trees that produced it. Her later research mapping the migration of tree species illustrated the differential timing and directions of movement of species during the past 14,000 years in eastern North America. This work has been influential in predicting the migration of tree species that may result from global climate changes. She also hypothesized that disease caused the decline in hemlock populations about 5,300 years ago in the northeastern US. Starting in the 1980s while at the University of Minnesota, Davis studied long-term forest dynamics of forest communities at the Sylvania Wilderness in the Upper Peninsula of Michigan. These old growth forests contain a mosaic of sugar maple and hemlock stands. She and her graduate students studied the fossil pollen throughout the forest. Their detailed analyses allowed them to trace local variation in forest composition through time and to see how disturbances such as windstorms and fire relate to changes in the forest.

=== Activism ===
When her husband Rowland obtained a job in the Department of Botany at the University of Michigan, she accepted a research position at the university in order to have a job near him. In a 1972 Ann Arbor News article, she stated that she believed this put her in a poor position to bargain for salary and that the university took advantage of her weak bargaining position by paying her lower wages than she merited. "Salary is set by bargaining," she said and added "Men can move. Everybody believes women can't. I was vulnerable to low wages because I couldn't leave the University. I was the lowest paid person in my ranking." Even after she was promoted to full professor, she was paid less than the average associate professor, the rank below full professor. She filed a complaint with the university and was eventually given both a pay raise and back pay, but only after considerable persistence on her part, including threatening a civil rights suit.

== Death ==
Davis died after a long illness in Colorado, on May 22, 2024, at the age of 92.

== Awards and honors ==
From 1978 to 1980, Davis served as the president of the American Quaternary Association. Davis also served as the president of the Ecological Society of America from 1987 to 1988; she was the third woman to be elected to that office since the Society's 1915 founding. In 1982, she became the first woman from the University of Minnesota to be elected to the National Academy of Sciences. She became a fellow of the American Academy of Arts and Sciences in 1991. In 1993, she became the 6th recipient of the Nevada Medal, awarded by the Desert Research Institute. That same year she became the 3rd woman to receive the Eminent Ecologist Award from the Ecological Society of America. In 2009, she became an honoree of National Women's History Month.

In 2011, she received the William S. Cooper Award from the Ecological Society of America. In 2012, she was elected Fellow of the Ecological Society of America. She was a member of the International Association for Vegetation Science and an Honorary Member of the British Ecological Society.

She received an honorary doctorate from the College of Biological Sciences of the University of Minnesota in 2012.

== Publications ==
Some of her most significant publications are:

- M. B. Davis Three pollen diagrams from central Massachusetts, 1958, American Journal of Science 256 pages 540–570. DOI: https://doi.org/10.2475/ajs.256.8.540
- Margaret B. Davis Pollen diagrams as evidence of late-glacial climatic change in southern New England, 1961, Annals of the New York Academy of Sciences 95 pages 623–631
- M. B. Davis Redeposition of pollen grains in lake sediments, 1968, Science 162 pages 796–799
- Margaret B. Davis Pleistocene biogeography of temperate deciduous forests, 1976, Geoscience and Man 13 pages 13–26
- Margaret B. Davis Erosion rates and land-use history in southern Michigan, 1976, Environmental Conservation 3 pages 139–148. doi:10.1017/S0376892900018269
- Margaret B. Davis Lags in vegetation response to Greenhouse warming, 1989, Climatic Change 15 pages 75–82. doi.org/10.1007/BF00138846
