= Crystal A. Kolden =

Academic geographer

- Scientific career
- Institutions: Ph.D. Clark University, Geography M.S. University of Nevada, Reno, Geography
- Website: http://www.pyrogeographer.com/

Crystal A. Kolden is an Associate Professor of Forest, Rangeland, and Fire Sciences at the University of Idaho. She received her Ph.D. in Geography from Clark University. She is an expert in fire sciences. She started her career as a wildfire fighter, but has since become a professor specializing in wildfire behavior.

== Early life and education ==
Crystal Kolden graduated cum laude from Cornell University with an A.B. in history. She received her M.S. in geography from University of Nevada, Reno in 2005. Crystal A. Kolden received her Ph.D. in geography from Clark University, located in Worcester, Massachusetts, in 2010.

== Career and research ==
=== Career ===
From 2003 to 2006 Crystal Kolden served as a fire ecologist for the USDA Forest Service at their Washington Office. While doing this she would fight wildfires, and monitor for other fires when not fighting them. From 2004 to 2012 she was an associate research scientist at the Desert Research Institute in Reno, NV. While working here, she researched fires and helped to develop new technologies trying to fight them. From 2007 to 2010 she was a Landscape Ecologist for the US Geological Survey taking place in Anchorage, AK. She surveyed the land around anchorage, and studied how it would be affected from change. From 2010 to 2011 Crystal Kolden served as Research Faculty at the University of Idaho. This was training to be a professor, which consisted of both research and leadership training. In 2011 she worked her way in the role of Assistant Professor of Geography at the University of Idaho, until 2016. In 2017 Crystal Kolden became Associate Professor of Forest, Rangeland, and Fire Sciences at University of Idaho, which she currently holds. She address wildfires in the modern climate change era.

=== Fields ===
Crystal Kolden is an expert in disturbances to nature, specifically wildfire, invasive species, humans, and other large ecological disturbances. She uses remote sensing to understand why these disturbances have happened in the past, and how to better predict them in the future.

== Awards and honors ==
- Best Graduate Paper, California Geographical Society Annual Meeting, 2005
- Best master's degree-level paper, Biogeography Specialty Group, Association of American Geographers Annual Meeting, 2005
- NASA-MSU Professional Enhancement Award, US-IALE, 2009
- USGS STAR (Special Thanks for Achieving Results) Award, 2009
- University of Nevada, Reno, College of Science Young Alumni Award, 2014
- One of 145 people included on the Women Leaders in Fire Science list

== Selected publications ==
- Kolden, Crystal A.; Abatzoglou, John T. (2013-11-14). "Relationships between climate and macroscale area burned in the western United States". International Journal of Wildland Fire. 22 (7): 1003–1020. doi:10.1071/WF13019. ISSN 1448-5516.
- Stocks, B.; Kolden, C. A.; Larkin, N. K.; Abatzoglou, J. T.; Barbero, R. (2015-11-05). "Climate change presents increased potential for very large fires in the contiguous United States" (PDF). International Journal of Wildland Fire. 24 (7): 892–899. doi:10.1071/WF15083. ISSN 1448-5516.
- Kolden, Crystal A.; Lutz, James A.; Key, Carl H.; Kane, Jonathan T.; Van Wagtendonk, Jan W. (2012). "Mapped versus actual burned area within wildfire perimeters: Characterizing the unburned". Forest Ecology and Management. 286: 38–47. doi:10.1016/j.foreco.2012.08.020.
- Jones, Benjamin M.; Kolden, Crystal A.; Jandt, Randi; Abatzoglou, John T.; Urban, Frank; Arp, Christopher D. (2009). "Fire Behavior, Weather, and Burn Severity of the 2007 Anaktuvuk River Tundra Fire, North Slope, Alaska". Arctic, Antarctic, and Alpine Research. 41 (3): 309–316. Bibcode:2009AAAR...41..309J. doi:10.1657/1938-4246-41.3.309.
- Smith, Alistair M.S.; Kolden, Crystal A.; Tinkham, Wade T.; Talhelm, Alan F.; Marshall, John D.; Hudak, Andrew T.; Boschetti, Luigi; Falkowski, Michael J.; Greenberg, Jonathan A.; Anderson, John W.; Kliskey, Andrew; Alessa, Lilian; Keefe, Robert F.; Gosz, James R. (2014). "Remote sensing the vulnerability of vegetation in natural terrestrial ecosystems". Remote Sensing of Environment. 154: 322–337. Bibcode:2014RSEnv.154..322S. doi:10.1016/j.rse.2014.03.038.
