= Blick Mead =

Archaeological site in Wiltshire, England

- Map showing Blick Mead within the Stonehenge section of the Stonehenge and Avebury World Heritage Site
- Interactive map of Blick Mead
- 51.1774°N 1.7878°W
- Type: Mesolithic site
- Periods: Mesolithic
- Location: near Amesbury
- Region: Wiltshire
- OS grid reference: SU14934204

Site notes
- Excavation dates: 2005 onwards

UNESCO World Heritage Site
- Designated: 1986
- Reference no.: 373

Blick Mead is a chalkland spring in Wiltshire, England, separated by the River Avon from the northwest edge of the town of Amesbury. It is close to an Iron Age hillfort known as Vespasian's Camp and about a mile east of the Stonehenge ancient monument. Evidence from archaeological excavations at the site since 2005 indicates that there was continuous human habitation from 10,000 BP (8,000 BCE) to 6,000 BP (4,000 BCE).

70,000 worked flints and 2400 animal bones, some cooked, mostly from aurochs, have been found at the site. There is also the remains of a pit dwelling formed from a tree throw. A few finds have been used to radiocarbon date the time of settlement. It is thought that the site would have been an attractive place to camp or dwell, with a spring that never freezes over; the issuing water has a constant temperature of around 11 °C (52 °F).

Oxygen isotope analysis of a single canine premolar found at Blick Mead has been interpreted as evidence that people had travelled a long way to get there and that this was associated with its proximity to Stonehenge. However, this is inconclusive as, while the isotope values are not consistent with the dog originating at the site, it represents the only example of a dietary isotope profile for a tooth from the Mesolithic, from any species.

A rare algae called Hildenbrandia lives in the spring and causes stones taken from it to turn bright red on exposure to air in a matter of hours. In Mesolithic times this could have given the place a magical significance. Its closeness to Stonehenge has led to theories that it is the attraction that first brought hunters to the area, with the colour-changing stones giving the place a spiritual significance. In 2019 it was the subject of episode 4 of season 1 of Lost Cities with Albert Lin.
