= Mordy (disambiguation) =

Mordy is a town in Masovian Voivodeship, Poland.

Mordy may also refer to:

- Gmina Mordy, gmina of the town Mordy
- Mordy Bromberg, Australian judge and Australian rules footballer
- Wendell A. Mordy, American atmospheric physicist
- Mordechai Shapiro, American singer
