= Nevada Medal =

Award presented by Governor of Nevada

The Nevada Medal was established in 1988 by the Desert Research Institute. It is awarded for "outstanding achievement in science and engineering", and is presented by the Governor of Nevada. The previous recipients are:

1. Verner Suomi
2. Dwight Billings
3. James A. Van Allen
4. Benoit Mandelbrot
5. Carl Djerassi
6. Margaret Bryan Davis
7. John N. Bahcall
8. Charles Elachi
9. Hector F. DeLuca
10. F. Sherwood Rowland
11. Lynn Margulis
12. Wallace Broecker
13. Harold Mooney
14. John H. Seinfeld
15. M. Gordon Wolman
16. Charles Goldman
17. Fakhri A. Bazzaz
18. Farouk El-Baz
19. Donald Grayson
20. Walter Alvarez
21. Susan Lindquist
22. James E. Hansen
23. Francis Collins
24. Robert Ballard
25. Steven Squyres
26. Nina Fedoroff
27. Albert Yu-Min Lin
28. Christopher McKay
29. Missy Cummings
30. Marcia McNutt
31. Kathryn Sullivan (2021)
