= Vespasian's Camp =

Iron Age hillfort in Wiltshire, England

UNESCO World Heritage Site
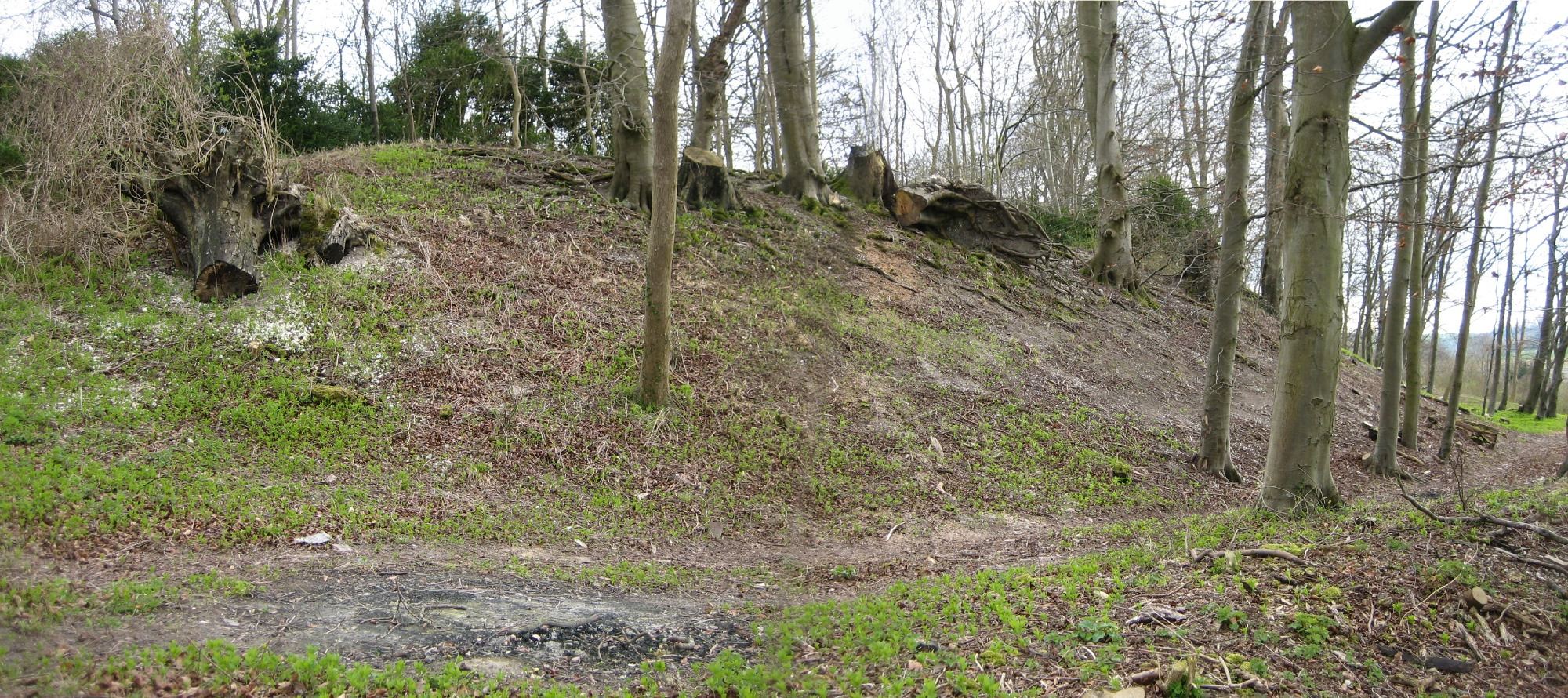
- North-western inner bank of Vespasian's Camp

- Location within Wiltshire Location within the United Kingdom
- Location: Wiltshire, England
- Part of: Stonehenge, Avebury and Associated Sites
- Criteria: Cultural: (i)(ii)(iii)
- Reference: 373bis-001
- Inscription: 1986 (10th Session)
- Extensions: 2008
- Coordinates: 51°10′26″N 1°47′35″W

Vespasian's Camp is an Iron Age hillfort just west of the town of Amesbury, Wiltshire, England. The hillfort is less than 3 kilometres (2 mi) from the Neolithic and Bronze Age site of Stonehenge, and was built on a hill next to the Stonehenge Avenue; it has the River Avon on its southern side and the A303 road on its northern edge. The site is a scheduled monument and lies within the boundaries of the Stonehenge World Heritage Site.

Other hillforts nearby include Danebury to the east, Sidbury Hill and Casterley Camp to the north, Yarnbury Castle to the west and Figsbury Ring and Old Sarum to the south. Ogbury Camp, 3 miles (5 km) to the south, may have been a satellite enclosure of Vespasian's Camp.

== Toponym ==
The earthworks were named "Vespasian's Camp" in the 16th century by William Camden, an Elizabethan antiquarian and historian, during a tour of the area. Although the Roman general Vespasian, who was later Roman emperor from 69 to 79 CE, campaigned through Wessex after the Roman invasion of Britain in 43 CE, there is no evidence to suggest he came to this hillfort or had any military base here.

== Description ==
Aligned from north to south, the hillfort is 730 m (800 yd) long and 374 m (409 yd) wide at its southern end, narrowing to 100 m (110 yd) wide at the north. It encloses an area of some 14 ha (35 acres). The bank is up to 40 m (44 yd) wide and up to 6 m (6.6 yd) high above the ditch bottom. The ditch is up to 10 m (11 yd) wide with a low counterscarp bank up to 18 m (20 yd) wide on the outside of the ditch, creating a maximum width of the hillfort's defences of 68 m (74 yd).

It occupies a strong defensive position. There are two original entrances, one on the north and the other probably to the south-east, just north of the point where Stonehenge Road cuts through the camp.

A road constructed over the hilltop in the Middle Ages separates the southern part of the site from the rest of the hillfort. During the 18th century, the hillfort was landscaped as part of the Duke of Queensbury's grounds around Amesbury Abbey. A grotto, vista and paths were constructed and substantial tree planting was carried out. The A303 road was cut through the northern section of the hill in the 1970s, just below the northernmost bank.

== Archaeological research ==
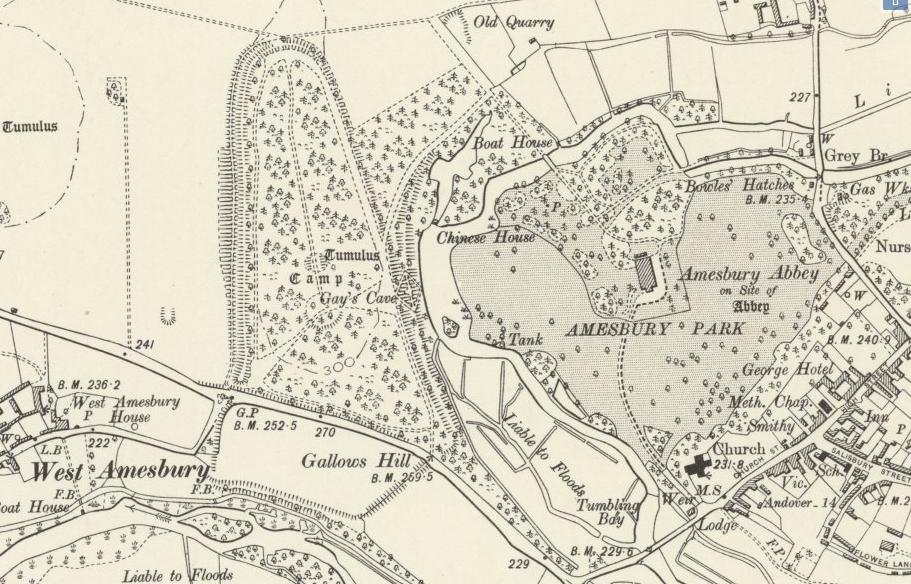
The location of Vespasian's Camp Iron Age hillfort in relation to West Amesbury, Amesbury Abbey and the modern town of Amesbury shown on a six inches to the mile OS map of Wiltshire, England published in 1901.

During road-widening in 1964, the main western rampart was partly uncovered. It had been assumed that most of the archaeology had been lost during the 18th-century landscaping of the area by Charles Bridgeman and others for the Duke of Queensberry. However, documentary research showed that the hillfort had escaped most of the landscaping, and excavations began in 2005, concentrating on an area just north-east of Vespasian's Camp known as Blick Mead.

The first finds were tools ranging as far back as the Mesolithic. What had been thought to be a water feature was an ancient spring which might have been part of a seasonal lake. There is a one-metre (40-inch) thick layer of domestic waste that suggests the hill had a considerable population after the banks were constructed. Occupation of the site spanned the period from 6250 to 4700 BCE. It has been suggested that the hill may have been part of the Stonehenge ritual landscape during the later part of this period.

Further work in 2010 uncovered a 12 cm (4.7 in) layer of Mesolithic material including 10,000 pieces of struck flint and over 300 pieces of animal bone, a find described by Professor Tim Darvill as "the most important discovery at Stonehenge in many years". The struck flint tools were in pristine condition, sharp enough to cut the fingers of some of the excavators, and it is believed that the layer may extend several hundred metres further. The archaeologist Carly Hilts states:

These thousands of tools include an impressive range of implements, from microliths, backed blades (used for making knives, arrows and other composite tools), and burins for working bone and antler, to notched tools (perhaps for cutting sinews or stripping bark to make baskets) and scrapers, as well as cores and knapping debitage representing all stages of the production process. We have also recovered three tranchet axes, a significant haul given that only five had previously been found in the whole Salisbury Plain landscape. Virtually all of these tools are in pristine condition.

One tool was made out of worked slate, a material not found in the area. A possible source could be a slate glacial erratic, though there are none known to exist in the vicinity; or the slate could have been carried from the nearest source in North Wales. If this is the source it implies that, hundreds of years before Stonehenge, this may have been a "special place to gather". Evidence suggests that the area around the spring was used for large feasts, including the consumption of aurochs, and as a centre for tool-making. An unusual form of Mesolithic domestic site was also found: a semi-permanent site for families called a "homebase".

== UNESCO World Heritage Site ==
Boundary and key sites for the Stonehenge section of the Stonehenge and Avebury World Heritage Site

Stonehenge, Avebury and Associated Sites is a UNESCO World Heritage Site (WHS) located in Wiltshire, England. The WHS covers two large areas of land separated by nearly 30 miles (48 km), rather than a specific monument or building. The sites were inscribed as co-listings in 1986. A number of large and well known monuments lie within the WHS, but the area also has an exceptionally high density of small-scale archaeological sites, particularly from the prehistoric period. More than 700 individual archaeological features have been identified. There are 160 separate scheduled monuments, covering 415 items or features. Vespasian's Camp lies near the eastern boundary of the southern section of the site.

== Notes ==
=== Bibliography ===
- Cooper-White, Macrina (2014). "New Stonehenge Discovery Hailed As "Most Important in 60 Years"". HuffPost.
- Hilts, Carly (2013). "Vespasian's Camp: Cradle of Stonehenge". Current Archaeology.
- Historic England. "Vespasian's Camp (1012126)". National Heritage List for England.
- Hutton, Lauren (2011). "Open University Student Discovery Changes Understanding of Stonehenge". The Open University.
- Young, Christpher; Chadburn, Amanda; Bedu, Isabelle (2009). Stonehenge World Heritage Site Management Plan 2009 (PDF). London: English Heritage. ISBN 978-1-84802-041-2.
