= Ampacity =

Maximum current that can be applied continuously without harming a device or system

Ampacity is a portmanteau for ampere capacity, defined by United States National Electrical Codes. Ampacity is defined as the maximum current, in amperes, that a conductor can carry continuously under the conditions of use without exceeding its temperature rating.

The ampacity of a conductor depends on its ability to dissipate heat without damage to the conductor or its insulation. This is a function of the insulation temperature rating, the electrical resistance of the conductor material, the ambient temperature, and the ability of the insulated conductor to dissipate heat to the surroundings.

All common electrical conductors have some resistance to the flow of electricity. Electric current flowing through conductors heats them. If heat is produced at a sufficient rate, the conductor temperature rises and the insulation can be damaged or ultimately the conductor itself can sag or melt.

The ampacity rating for a conductor is based on the conductor diameter, material used (copper or aluminum), the rated maximum application temperature, and the installation conditions. Installation regulations describe the required factors to be applied for any particular installation. Conductors installed so that air can freely move over them can be rated to carry more current than conductors run inside a conduit or buried underground. High ambient temperature may reduce the current rating of a conductor. Cables run in wet or oily locations may carry a lower temperature rating than in a dry installation. A lower rating will apply if multiple conductors are in proximity, since each contributes heat to the others and diminishes the amount of external cooling of the conductors.

Depending on the type of insulating material, common maximum allowable temperatures at the surface of the conductor are 60, 75, and 90 °C, often with an ambient air temperature of 30 °C. In the United States, 105 °C is allowed with ambient of 40 °C, for larger power cables, especially those operating at more than 2 kV. Likewise, specific insulations are rated 150, 200, or 250 °C.

The allowed current in a conductor generally needs to be decreased (derated) when conductors are in a grouping or cable, enclosed in conduit, or an enclosure restricting heat dissipation. For example, the United States National Electrical Code, Table 310.15(B)(16), specifies that up to three 8 AWG copper wires having a common insulating material (THWN) in a raceway, cable, or direct burial has an ampacity of 50 A when the ambient air is 30 °C, the conductor surface temperature allowed to be 75 °C. A single insulated conductor in free air has 70 A rating.

Ampacity rating is normally for continuous current, and short periods of overcurrent occur without harm in most cabling systems. Electrical code rules will give ratings for wiring where short-term loads are present, for example, in a hoisting motor. For systems such as underground power transmission cables, evaluation of the short-term over-load capacity of the cable system requires a detailed analysis of the cable's thermal environment and an evaluation of the commercial value of the lost service life due to excess temperature rise.

Design of an electrical system will normally include consideration of the current-carrying capacity of all conductors of the system.

== See also ==
- Neher–McGrath method
