= Fakhri A. Bazzaz =

Iraqi-American plant ecologist (1933–2008)

- Born: June 16, 1933; Baghdad, Iraq
- Died: February 6, 2008 (aged 74); Lexington, Massachusetts, US
- Education: Baghdad University; University of Illinois at Urbana–Champaign
- Known for: Plant community ecological succession
- Awards: Guggenheim Fellowship; Humboldt Prize; Nevada Medal; King Faisal Prize for Biology; Leverhulme Professorship; UIUC Alumni Award
- Scientific career
- Fields: Plant ecology
- Workplaces: Harvard University
- Doctoral advisor: Lawrence Bliss

Professor Fakhri Al-Bazzaz (June 16, 1933 – February 6, 2008) (nicknamed by his students, "Chief") was an Iraqi-American plant ecologist specializing in the study of plant community ecological succession. A professor and prolific author, he was ranked amongst the top ten "Most Cited Scientists in Environment/Ecology, 1992–2002".

== Early years ==
Bazzaz was born to a Sunni Muslim family in Baghdad, Iraq. After receiving his bachelor's degree in biology at Baghdad University (1953), he received an appointment at Baghdad's Rasafa Education District. His science career was influenced by Baghdad University's biologist Abdul Karim Al-Khudairy and meteorologist Abdul Jabbar Abdullah. Bazzaz completed his studies at the University of Illinois at Urbana–Champaign where he received postgraduate degrees (M.Sc.,1960; Ph.D., 1963).

== Career ==
He worked at Baghdad University as a lecturer before becoming a professor at the University of Illinois. At Harvard University, he served as the Timken Professor of Science and the Mallinckodt Professor of Biology. Bazzaz specialized in the study of plant community succession. He was the author of six books and over 200 scientific papers, including an important scholarly paper in 1990 on Carbon dioxide effects. In May 1997, as one of 21 American experts on ecological systems and climate, he co-signed a letter to President Bill Clinton and VP Al Gore regarding global climate change. He was ranked in the top ten of the "Most Cited Scientists in Environment/Ecology, 1992–2002". In 2026, the Ecological Society of America established the Fakhri A. Bazzaz & Steward T.A. Pickett Award in honor of his contributions to the field of ecology and his legacy of mentoring the next generation of ecologists, fostering diversity, inclusion and belonging. Bazzaz mentored more than 50 doctoral students over the course of his career.

He was elected a Fellow of several organizations: Clare Hall of Cambridge University, the American Association for the Advancement of Science, the American Academy of Arts and Sciences, and the Japan Society for the Promotion of Science. His awards include a Guggenheim Fellowship, the Humboldt Prize, the Nevada Medal, the King Faisal Prize for Biology, a Leverhulme Professorship, and the UIUC LAS Alumni Achievement Award. He was a founding member of the Iraqi National Academy of Science in 2003, and was an advisory board member of Arab Science and Technology Foundation (ASTF); the ASTF's Fakhri Bazzaz Award was established in his honor.

== Personal life ==
Bazzaz married the biologist Maarib Bakri in 1958, and had two children, a daughter Sahar, and a son Ammar. Bazzaz's brother, Abd ar-Rahman al-Bazzaz, served as OPEC Secretary General and Prime Minister of Iraq. Bazzaz's interests included Arabic calligraphy and Arabic poetry. He died in 2008 in Lexington, Massachusetts, US from stroke related complications.

== Partial works ==
- (1977) Plant resource allocation, with John Grace
- (1985) The effect of elevated atmospheric CO_{2} on plant communities, with K. Garbutt, W. E. Williams
- (1992) Plant Life in a CO_{2}-Rich World, with Eric D. Fajer
- (1996) Carbon dioxide, populations, and communities, with Christian Korner
- (1996) Plants in changing environments : linking physiological, population, and community ecology
- (1996) Global climate change and agricultural production direct and indirect effects of changing hydrological, pedological and plant physiological processes, with Wim G Sombroek
- (2002) Interactive Effects of Diversity Nutrients and Elevated CO_{2} on Experimental Plant Communities, with Jin-Sheng He and Bernhard Schmid
