= Neher–McGrath method =

Estimation method in electrical engineering

In electrical engineering, Neher–McGrath is a method of estimating the steady-state temperature of electrical power cables for some commonly encountered configurations. By estimating the temperature of the cables, the safe long-term current-carrying capacity of the cables can be calculated.

J. H. Neher and M. H. McGrath were two electrical engineers who wrote a paper in 1957 about how to calculate the capacity of current (ampacity) of cables. The paper described two-dimensional highly symmetric simplified calculations which have formed the basis for many cable application guidelines and regulations. Complex geometries, or configurations that require three-dimensional analysis of heat flow, require more complex tools such as finite element analysis. Their article became used as reference for the ampacity in most of the standard tables.

== Overview ==
The Neher–McGrath paper summarized years of research into analytical treatment of the practical problem of heat transfer from power cables. The methods described included all the heat generation mechanisms from a power cable (conductor loss, dielectric loss and shield loss).

From the basic principles that electric current leads to thermal heating and thermal power transfer to the ambient environment requires some temperature difference, it follows that the current leads to a temperature rise in the conductors. The ampacity, or maximum allowable current, of an electric power cable depends on the allowable temperatures of the cable and any adjacent materials such as insulation or termination equipment. For insulated cables, the insulation maximum temperature is normally the limiting material property that constrains ampacity. For uninsulated cables (typically used in outdoor overhead installations), the tensile strength of the cable (as affected by temperature) is normally the limiting material property. The Neher–McGrath method is the electrical industry standard for calculating cable ampacity, most often employed via lookup in tables of precomputed results for common configurations.

== US National Electrical Code use ==
The equation in section 310-15(C) of the National Electrical Code, called the Neher–McGrath equation (NM), may be used to estimate the effective ampacity of a cable:
$$I = \frac{\sqrt{T_c-(T_a + \Delta T_d)}}{R_\text{dc}(1+Y_c)R_{c,a}}$$

In the equation, $T_c$ is normally the limiting conductor temperature derived from the insulation or tensile strength limitations. $\Delta T_d$ is a term added to the ambient temperature $T_a$ to compensate for heat generated in the jacket and insulation for higher voltages. $\Delta T_d$ is called the dielectric loss temperature rise and is generally regarded as insignificant for voltages below 2000 V. Term $1+Y_c$ is a multiplier used to convert direct current resistance ($R_\text{dc}$) to the effective alternating current resistance (which typically includes conductor skin effects and eddy current losses). For wire sizes smaller than AWG No. 2 (33.6 mm^{2}, 0.0521 sq in), this term is also generally regarded as insignificant. $R_{c,a}$ is the effective thermal resistance between the conductor and the ambient conditions, which can require significant empirical or theoretical effort to estimate. With respect to the AC-sensitive terms, tabular presentation of the NM equation results in the National Electrical Code was developed assuming the standard North American power frequency of 60 hertz and sinusoidal wave forms for current and voltage.

The challenges posed by the complexity of estimating $R_{c,a}$ and of estimating the local increase in ambient temperature obtained by co-locating many cables (in a duct bank) create a market niche in the electric power industry for software dedicated to ampacity estimation.
