= Wendell A. Mordy =

American atmospheric physicist (1920–2002)

Wendell A. Mordy (April 28, 1920 – July 14, 2002) was an American atmospheric physicist. He was the founding director of the Desert Research Institute in Reno, Nevada.

== Early life ==
Mordy was born on April 28, 1920, in Rock Island, Illinois. He attended Pomona College, graduating in 1942, and then obtained a doctorate from Stockholm University in 1958. He served as a commanding officer of a U.S. Army Air Forces meteorological detachment in Europe during World War II.

== Career ==
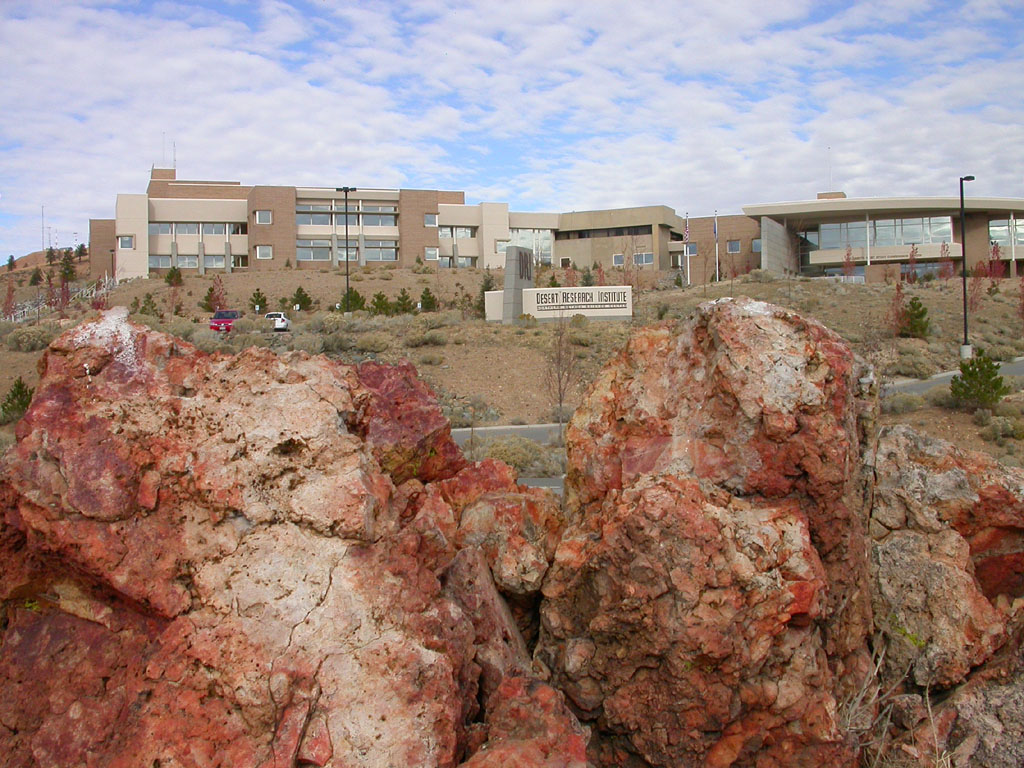
The Desert Research Institute

Mordy initially became well known as a leading authority on cloud-seeding techniques. In 1960, he became the founding director of the Desert Research Institute, a position in which he served until 1969. He subsequently became the director of the Sea Grant Institute of the University of Miami and president of the Science Museum of Minnesota. He also served as the founding president of the International Space Theater Consortium, helping to pioneer 360-degree video projection systems.

== Personal life ==
Mordy married Brooke Davis on November 30, 1942. He had two daughters.

== Retirement and death ==
Mordy died on July 14, 2002.
