= Albert Lin =

American engineer, explorer, and tv host

- Born: March 22, 1981 (age 45); Santa Cruz County, California
- Education: University of California, San Diego (BS, MS, PhD)
- Occupations: Engineer; scientist; TV host

Albert Yu-Min Lin is an American engineer, scientist, technologist, explorer and television host. He is a senior lecturer and an associate research scientist of mechanical and aerospace engineering at University of California, San Diego. Since 2019 he has been the presenter of Lost Cities With Albert Lin.

== Early life and education ==
Lin was born on 22 March 1981, in Santa Cruz County, California. He completed a bachelor of science (2004), a masters of science (2006) and a PhD (2008) in mechanical and aerospace engineering from the University of California San Diego.

== Career ==
Lin has been an associate research scientist at the California Institute for Telecommunications and Information Technology at UC San Diego since 2008. He is the founding director of UC San Diego's Center for Human Frontiers, which aims to harness technology to augment human potential. He founded the crowd-based analytics company Tomnod, which was acquired in 2011 by commercial satellite imagery provider DigitalGlobe.

Lin's work gained attention in 2009 for utilizing a combination of satellites, drones, geophysics, and intensive ground exploration to search for the missing tomb of Genghis Khan. For his work on the Valley of the Khans project, he was named National Geographic's Adventurer of the Year for 2009.

In addition to his scholarly work, Lin has been a National Geographic Society Explorer since 2010. He has hosted a number of National Geographic television shows which document his research expeditions, including Forbidden Tomb of Genghis Khan (2011), China's Megatomb Revealed (2016), Lost Treasures of the Maya (2018), and Buried Secrets of the Bible (2019).

Since 2019, he has hosted the National Geographic series Lost Cities with Albert Lin. The show focuses on the use of drones and LIDAR (light detection and ranging) imaging to reveal otherwise hidden archaeological structures within and beneath modern cities and remote landscapes.

== Personal life ==
Lin grew up surfing and is an avid outdoorsman. He is fluent in English and Mandarin.

In 2016, part of Lin's right leg was amputated after being severely damaged during a crash in a four-wheel-drive open-top vehicle. Everything from the knee down was removed in an attempt to alleviate pain, but Lin was in turn plagued by phantom limb pain. He credits a heavy dose of psilocybin with improving the symptoms. Since then, he has worn a high-tech prosthetic leg which has allowed him to continue to lead and participate in extremely physically demanding expeditions. Lin, primarily through his Center for Human Frontiers, has become a vocal advocate for improving access to prosthetics using technology including 3D printing.

With Kara Lin, Lin has two children, son Charlie and daughter Millie. In April, 2025, Charlie Lin was injured in a skiing accident in Reno, Nevada, and suffered a traumatic brain injury. Charlie was treated at Renown Hospital Tahoe Tower and has since made "remarkable" steps toward recovery.

== Recognition ==
Lin is a recipient of both the Desert Research Institute Nevada Medal and the Lowell Thomas Medal from The Explorers Club.

== Select works ==
- Cabrera, Isaac A; Pike, Trinity C.; McKittrick, Joanna M.; Meyers, Marc A.; Rao, Ramesh R.; Lin, Albert Y. (3 December 2021). "Digital healthcare technologies: Modern tools to transform prosthetic care". Expert Review of Medical Devices. 18 (sup1): 129–144. doi:10.1080/17434440.2021.1991309. PMID 34644232. S2CID 222218199.
- Lin, Albert Yu-Min (March 2010). The search for Genghis Khan: Using modern tools to hunt for an ancient past. 2010 IEEE Aerospace Conference. pp. 1–2. doi:10.1109/AERO.2010.5447038. ISBN 978-1-4244-3887-7. S2CID 11281796.
- "Correction: Crowdsourcing the unknown: The satellite search for Genghis Khan". PLoS One. 10 (3) e0121045. 25 March 2015. Bibcode:2015PLoSO..1021045.. doi:10.1371/journal.pone.0121045. PMC 4373731. PMID 25806941.
- Lin, Albert Yu-Min; Huynh, Andrew; Lanckriet, Gert; Barrington, Luke (30 December 2014). "Crowdsourcing the unknown: The satellite search for Genghis Khan". PLOS ONE. 9 (12) e114046. Bibcode:2014PLoSO...9k4046L. doi:10.1371/journal.pone.0114046. PMC 4280225. PMID 25549335.
