= Desert Research Institute =

Public research institute in Nevada, U.S.

- Established: March 23, 1959; 67 years ago
- Parent institution: Nevada System of Higher Education
- President: Kumud Acharya
- Academic staff: 500
- Location: 2215 Raggio Parkway, Reno, Nevada, 89512, United States
- Website: dri.edu

Desert Research Institute (DRI) is a nonprofit research campus of the Nevada System of Higher Education (NSHE) and a sister property of the University of Nevada, Reno (UNR), the organization that oversees all publicly supported higher education in the U.S. state of Nevada. At DRI, approximately 500 research faculty and support staff engage in more than $50 million in environmental research each year. DRI's environmental research programs are divided into three core divisions (Atmospheric Sciences, Earth and Ecosystem Sciences, and Hydrologic Sciences) and two interdisciplinary centers (Center for Arid Lands Environmental Management and the Center for Watersheds and Environmental Sustainability). Established in 1988 and sponsored by AT&T, the institute's Nevada Medal awards "outstanding achievement in science and engineering".

== Programs ==
=== Cloud Seeding Program ===
DRI weather modification research produced the Nevada State Cloud Seeding Program in the 1960s. This initiative, funded by the U.S. Bureau of Reclamation and the National Oceanic and Atmospheric Administration, seeks to augment snowfall in mountainous regions of Nevada to increase snowpack and water supply. DRI researchers use ground stations and aircraft to release microscopic silver iodide particles into winter clouds, stimulating the formation of ice crystals that develop to snow.

Research indicates that cloud seeding leads to precipitation rate increases of 0.1–1.5 millimeters per hour.

=== Atmospheric and Dispersion Modeling Program ===
For over a decade the Atmospheric and Dispersion Modeling Program team has been performing work focused on observations and modeling of atmospheric dispersion processes over complex terrain and coastal areas. In particular, the team is applying, developing, and evaluating mesoscale meteorological models as well as regulatory and advanced atmospheric dispersion models such as ISC3ST, AERMOD, WYNDVALLEY, ASPEN, and CALPUFF. They have developed a Lagrangian Random Particle Dispersion Model that has been applied to complex coastal and inland environments.

Several recent projects led to developing real-time mesoscale forecasting system using the MM5 model coupled with a Lagrangian random particle dispersion model and implementation of data assimilation schemes.

== History ==
A two-page bill signed into law by the Nevada Governor Grant Sawyer on March 23, 1959, authorized establishment of the Desert Research Institute at the University of Nevada, Reno.

UNR hired Dr. Wendell Mordy as the Founding Director (1960–1969) of the University's Desert Research Institute, which initially was an office at the top of the historic Morrill Hall building on UNR's campus. Early on Mordy also initiated the development of the UNR's Fleishmann Atmospherium Planetarium. (Note: First-hand knowledge as the son of Edwin X Berry, who joined DRI in 1961.)

Microplastics were found for the first time in Lake Tahoe in 2019 by the Desert Research Institute. They plan on studying the pollution to determine if it is from local sources or if particles from discarded plastic products have been transported long distances through the atmosphere by wind, rain and falling snow.

== Campuses ==
Main research campuses

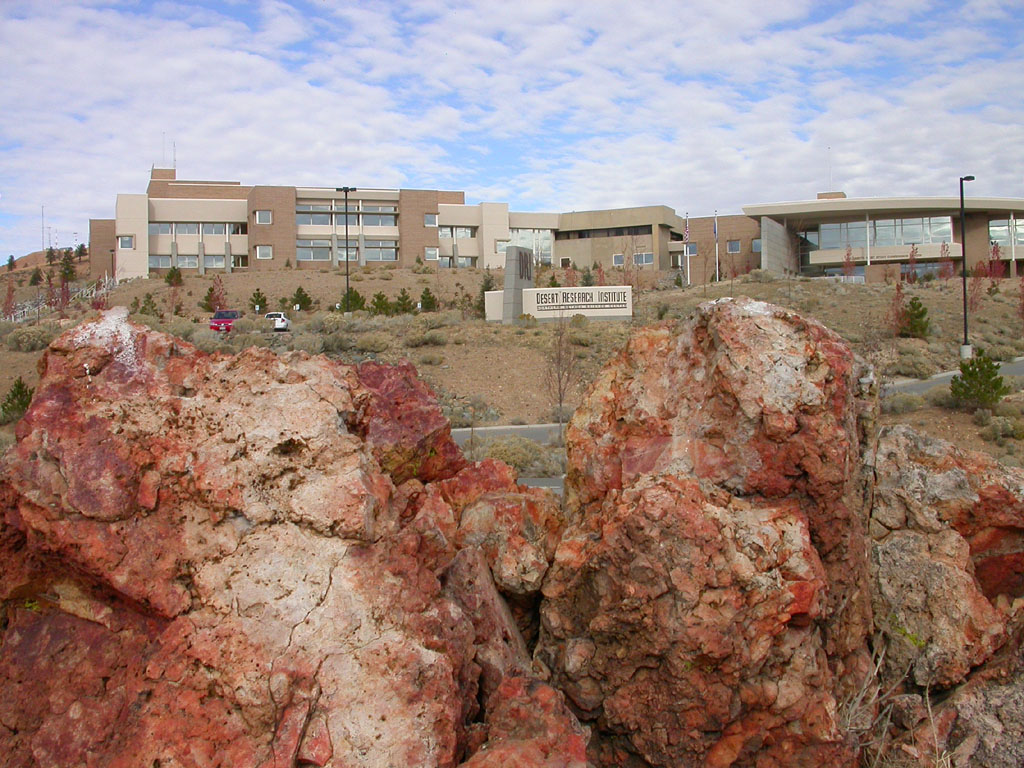
The Desert Research Institute, Reno, Nevada

- Dandini Research Park – Reno, Nevada
- Southern Nevada Science Park – Paradise, Nevada 36°6′50″N 115°8′54″W

Subsidiary campuses

- Boulder City Research Facility – Boulder City, Nevada
- Storm Peak Laboratory – Steamboat Springs, Colorado
- Stead Research Facility - Reno, Nevada

== See also ==
- Atmospheric dispersion modeling
- List of atmospheric dispersion models
