= Edmund Antrobus (disambiguation) =

Sir Edmund Antrobus, 3rd Baronet (1818–1899) was a British politician.

Edmund Antrobus may also refer to:

- Sir Edmund Antrobus, 1st Baronet (died 1826) of the Antrobus baronets
- Sir Edmund Antrobus, 2nd Baronet (1792–1870) of the Antrobus baronets, High Sheriff of Wiltshire
- Sir Edmund Antrobus, 4th Baronet (1848–1915) of the Antrobus baronets

== See also ==
- Antrobus (disambiguation)
