= Antrobus (surname) =

Antrobus is a surname. Notable people with the surname include:

- Sir Charles Antrobus (1933–2002), British Governor-General of St. Vincent and the Grenadines
- Edmund Antrobus (disambiguation), several people
- Geoffrey Antrobus (1904–1991), South African cricketer
- Gibbs Antrobus (1793–1861), British diplomat and politician
- John Antrobus (cricketer) (1806–1878), English clergyman and cricketer
- John Antrobus (1933–2025), British playwright and scriptwriter
- Laverne Antrobus (born 1966), British child psychologist and television presenter
- Paul Antrobus (1935–2015), Canadian Baptist missionary and professor of psychology
- Peggy Antrobus (born 1935), Grenadian feminist activist, author, and scholar
- Raymond Antrobus (born 1986), British poet, educator and writer
- Sir Reginald Antrobus (1853–1942), civil servant and crown agent
- Robert Antrobus (1830–1911), British businessman, politician and cricketer
- Sophy Antrobus, British historian
- Yvonne Antrobus (born 1940), British novelist, abridger, radio dramatist, and actress

Fictional characters:

- George and Maggie Antrobus, characters in the Thornton Wilder play The Skin of Our Teeth
- Antrobus, in the eponymous stories by Lawrence Durrell

== See also ==
- Antrobus baronets
- Steve Anthrobus (born 1968), English footballer
