= Peter King (British politician) =

English politician

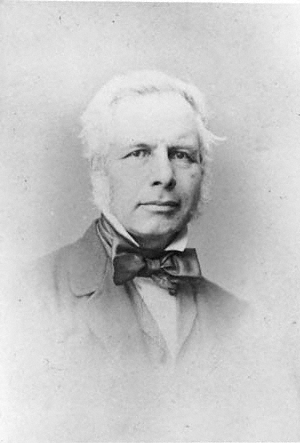
Peter John Locke King, by John & Charles Watkins

The Hon. Peter John Locke King (25 January 1811, Ockham, Surrey – 12 November 1885, Weybridge) was an English politician.

King sat and held one of the two seats as Member of Parliament (MP) for East Surrey from 1847 to 1874. He won some fame as an advocate of reform, responsible for the passing of the Real Estate Charges Act 1854, and for the repeal of many obsolete laws. Increasingly as politics in the United Kingdom turned toward the left wing he sided with the mainstream progressive wing of the Liberal Party.

== Biography ==
King was the second son of Peter King, 7th Baron King. Lord Chancellor Peter King, 1st Baron King, was his great-great-grandfather and William King-Noel, 1st Earl of Lovelace, his elder brother.

He was born at Ockham, Surrey, on 25 January 1811. He was educated at Harrow School and at Trinity College, Cambridge, where he graduated B.A. 1831, and M.A. 1833.

In 1837 he unsuccessfully contested East Surrey. He served as High Sheriff of Surrey in 1840. In the election of 1847 he stood again and this time was elected MP for East Surrey on 11 August. He retained his seat until more entrenched partisanship set in and a Conservative reaction defeated him at the general election in February 1874. He supported an alteration in the law of primogeniture for many sessions. On 15 March 1855 he delivered a speech in which he showed emphatically "the crying injustice of the law".

On 11 August 1854 Parliament passed the Real Estate Charges Act, which King had introduced on 6 April. Under this Act mortgages after the debtor's demise limit themselves to the property itself (they "descend with and bear their own burdens"). Without this mortgagees in possession could seek an order at court to trace certain contemporaneous held classes of property among beneficiaries. Its effect was to cap to the actual security the maximal loss of borrowing for borrowers' bereaved families and reduce unscrupulous lending among lenders, lowering also their expenses of asset tracing and frequently complex litigation. In the session of 1856 he was successful in obtaining the repeal of 120 sleeping statutes which were liable to be put in force from time to time. He also waged war against the statute law commission, and more than once denounced it as a job. King introduced a bill for abolishing the property qualification of members, which received royal assent on 28 June 1858, and in eight successive sessions he brought forward the county [equality of the] franchise bill, on one occasion, 20 February 1851, defeating and causing the resignation of the ministry led by fellow Whig, (Earl) Russell.

He piloted through the Commons the bill that extended the £10 (rental value of home per annum, whether owned or let) franchise to the county constituencies, i.e. as for every adult male who qualified for borough suffrage. He was well known for his advocacy for every man to have the ballot and for abolition of church rates, and for his strenuous opposition to the principle and practice alike of endowments for religious purposes. He died aged 74 at Brooklands, Weybridge, on 12 November 1885. His probate was resworn the next year at £266,860 (equivalent to about £29,600,000 in 2025). His London home was 38 Dover Street, Middlesex, (in St James's/Haymarket or Cornelia Street, Islington)

== Family and wealth ==
On 22 March 1836 King married Louisa Elizabeth, daughter of William Henry Hoare of Mitcham Grove, Surrey. She died in 1884. They had two sons and four daughters; they included Anna Clementina King (1837-1931) and Hugh F. Locke King, entrepreneur who inherited a share of his late parent's estate. He took over Brooklands and used his father's wealth to found and finance the creation of the Brooklands motor racing circuit and aviation field.

== Publications ==
King published:

1. Injustice of the Law of Succession to the Real Property of Intestates, 1854; 3rd edit. 1855.
2. Speech on the Laws relating to the Property of Intestates, 15 March 1855.
3. Speech on the Laws relating to the Property of Intestates in the House of Commons, 17 February 1859.
4. Speech on the Law relating to the Real Estates of Intestates, 14 July 1869.

Four letters which King wrote to The Times in 1855 on Chancery Reform are reprinted in A Bleak House Narrative of Real Life, 1856, pp. 55–66.

== See also ==
- Earl of Lovelace

== Notes ==
Parliament of the United Kingdom
Preceded by Sir Edmund Antrobus; Henry Kemble	Member of Parliament for East Surrey; 1847–1874; With: Thomas Alcock 1847–1865; Charles Buxton 1865–1871; James Watney 1871–1874	Succeeded by William Grantham; James Watney
Honorary titles
Preceded by Samuel Paynter	High Sheriff of Surrey; 1840	Succeeded by William Leveson-Gower
