= Antrobus =

Antrobus may refer to:

- Antrobus (surname)
- Antrobus, Cheshire, a village in Cheshire, England
- Antrobus baronets
