= Henry Kemble (politician) =

English teabroker and politician

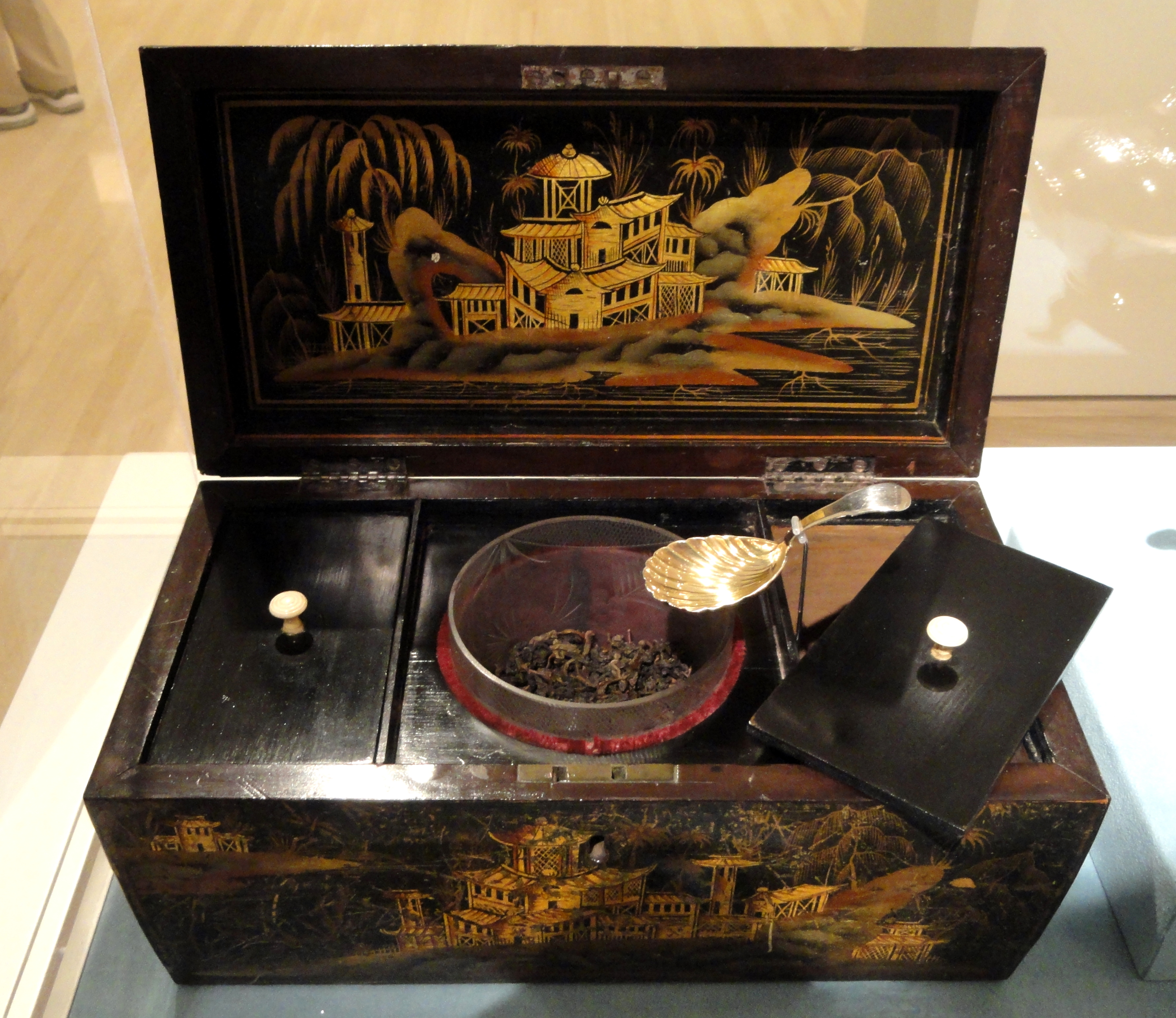
- Henry and Edward Kemble were very wealthy tea brokers in the City of London

Member of Parliament for East Surrey
- In office 3 August 1837 – 11 August 1847 Serving with Edmund Antrobus (1841–1847); Richard Alsager (1837–1841)
- Preceded by: Richard Alsager; Aubrey Beauclerk
- Succeeded by: Edmund Antrobus; Thomas Alcock

Personal details
- Born: 1787
- Died: 18 May 1857 (aged 69–70)
- Party: Conservative

Henry Kemble (1787–1857) was an English teabroker in successful partnership with his brother and Conservative Member of Parliament for East Surrey, England.

He was a retired, wealthy tea broker whose business was at St Antholin's Churchyard, Watling Street, City of London. This he conducted with his brother who left almost all of his estate to him in 1857, leading to combined death assets of over £500,000 (equivalent to about £48,900,000 in 2025).

He was elected to the Commons in one of the two seats for East Surrey as a Conservative at the 1837 general election and was re-elected until 1847 when he stood down.

Parliament of the United Kingdom
Preceded by Richard Alsager; Aubrey Beauclerk	Member of Parliament for East Surrey; 1837–1847; With: Edmund Antrobus (1841–1847); Richard Alsager (1837–1841)	Succeeded by Edmund Antrobus; Thomas Alcock
