= Aubrey Beauclerk (politician) =

British politician

Mjr. Aubrey William de Vere Beauclerk (1801 – 1854) was a Radical British Member of Parliament (MP), who was elected to serve the dual-member East Surrey, making contributions in the Commons between 1833 and 1837, when he did not stand for re-election. One of his great-grandfathers was a younger son of the 1st Duke of St Albans (paternal-line-only), two of the others were the 3rd Duke of Marlborough and 2nd Duke of Richmond.

== Domestic life ==
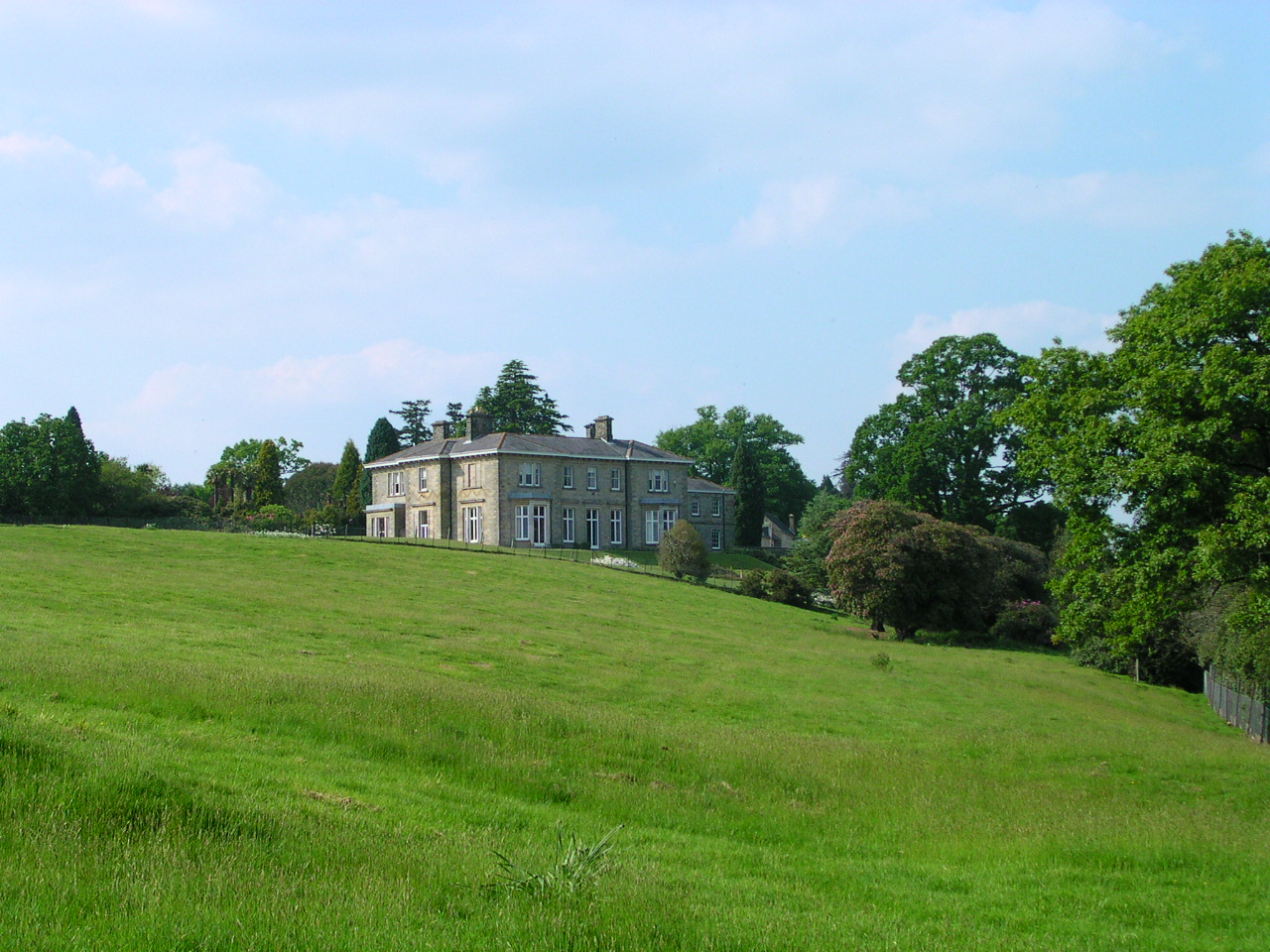
Leonardslee House (St Leonard's Lodge) and a grass-covered part of its extensive grounds

Born on 20 February 1801, he was the eldest son of Charles George Beauclerk and Emily Charlotte Ogilvie. His patrilineal great-grandfather was a younger son of the 1st Duke of St Albans, two of those on other lines were the 3rd Duke of Marlborough and 2nd Duke of Richmond, the latter through his mother. He was a political radical, active in the reform movement.

Seated at Ardglass Castle in County Down, Ireland, Beauclerk also had an English country house known as St. Leonard's Lodge, near Horsham, and a town house in Cheltenham.

On 13 February 1834 he married Ida Goring and had three daughters and in 1837 a namesake, Aubrey de Vere Beauclerk, who died in 1919 leaving as his widow, Evelyn née FitzRoy (died 1931), a granddaughter of the Rev Lord Henry FitzRoy. Ida Beauclerk drowned in the pond at St Leonard's Lodge, Sussex, on 23 April 1839; the jury and coroner met the next day at the house and found she might have accidentally fallen, being at times accustomed to giddiness. On 7 December 1841 he married Rose Matilda Robinson and they had two daughters. He admitted to an illegitimate son, born 1823, Rev. Charles Beauclerk of army captain rank, curate of four parishes in Ulster then vicar (1869-1875) of St Mary's Church, Belfast, then chaplain at Boulogne.

Two of Beauclerk's children died before aged 20, the remainder lived well into adulthood.

Beauclerk has been romantically involved with the nineteenth-century writer Mary Shelley.

He died on 1 February 1854 at Ardglass Castle, which he inherited from William Ogilvie his grandfather, and was buried in the family vault at the parish church.

== Career ==
A former army major, he was a Member of Parliament (MP) for East Surrey from 1832 to 1837. He was co-member for this area on its inception in December 1832. Hansard shows, from him, 114 speeches or questions spanning 1833 to 1837.

As an MP he supported the mainstream radical causes of the time, including the abolition of slavery, achieved in 1833 (with an until early 1840s process of indenturing particularly abroad in the Empire preceding many of the slaves' freedom) and of tithes, achieved in 1836 by way of a payoff and negligible payments system (commutation for a sum and apportionment of rentchange). He believed in a small, fixed duty (trade tariff) on corn, sought Anglican Church reform and an end to taxes on knowledge. Beauclerk was the only person, according to a letter from Mary Shelley to Claire Clairmont, to support Shelley's son Percy Florence Shelley's bid to become MP.

He was with two others appointed by the Irish Assize judges as High Sheriff of County Down for 1839, and 1853.

== Ancestry ==
Ancestors of Aubrey Beauclerk (politician)

16. Charles Beauclerk, 1st Duke of St Albans
8. Lord Sidney Beauclerk
17. Lady Diana de Vere
4. Topham Beauclerk
18. Thomas Norris
9. Mary Norris
19. Magdalen Aston
2. Charles George Beauclerk
20. Charles Spencer, 3rd Earl of Sunderland
10. Charles Spencer, 3rd Duke of Marlborough
21. Lady Anne Churchill
5. Lady Diana Spencer
22. Thomas Trevor, 2nd Baron Trevor
11. The Hon. Elizabeth Trevor
23. Elizabeth Burrell
1. Aubrey William de Vere Beauclerk
6. William Ogilvie
3. Emily Charlotte Ogilvie
28. Charles Lennox, 1st Duke of Richmond
14. Charles Lennox, 2nd Duke of Richmond
29. Anne Brudenell
7. Lady Emelia Lennox, Dowager Duchess of Leinster
30. William Cadogan, 1st Earl Cadogan
15. Lady Sarah Cadogan
31. Margaret Cecilia Munter

== See also ==
- Corn Laws
- Reform Act 1832
- Tithe Commutation Act 1836

== Notes and references ==
Parliament of the United Kingdom
New constituency	Member of Parliament for East Surrey; 1832–1837; With: John Ivatt Briscoe to 1835; Richard Alsager from 1835	Succeeded by Henry Kemble; Richard Alsager
