= 1841 East Surrey by-election =

UK Parliamentary by-election

The 1841 East Surrey by-election was polled on 12 February 1841. It was fought due to the death of the incumbent Conservative MP Richard Alsager.

== Nominations ==
The 9 February public hearing of nominations or hustings, chaired by the under-Sheriff, Mr Abbot, duly took place the day after paper submissions closed, at the Fairfield, Croydon. The ground was "pretty well occupied" by over 2000 supporters by 11 a.m., the start time. Hustings were erected and wagons of respective supporters drew up on the straw-laid ground; with pale blue and white widespread for Alcock and orange and purple displayed for Antrobus, beyond their carriages and among their musicians.

Candidates for East Surrey
Candidate	Party he would sit with	Residence(s)	Proposer 1	Proposer 2	Flag inscriptions at nomination (among others)	Stated positions
Edmund Antrobus	Conservative	Antrobus Hall, Cheshire and Amesbury Abbey, Wiltshire	A.K. Barclay	Samuel Paynter	Church and State; Church and Queen; United for our Queen and Country	Defender of the Corn Laws (duties on imports); Church-provided, local education Against the popular ballot
Thomas Alcock	Whigs and Liberals	Ringwood Lodge	Rev. Courtney	Sir E. Colebrook	Victoria the People's Queen; Liberty and Independence; Repeal of the bread tax	Against the Corn Laws; National, independent education For the popular ballot

The Morning Chronicle's reporter wrote he believed Lord Leveson intended to nominate Alcock but he arrived after the meeting, and covered the third spoken speech in support of Alcock, by a Mr Coates. It concluded a show of hands took place, taken to have fallen to Mr Alcock but a poll was, as was habitual, demanded for a week's time. Antrobus ultimately won, by 2,652 to 1,438 votes.

The Morning Post ran a report titled "East Surrey Election [new line] Triumph of Conservatism" acerbic of the "present ministers", describing the stated party of Alcock as Liberal 'misnamed' and him as a "Whig-Radical". It adds 200 of most Conservative-leaning electors met together at The Horns, chaired by W. Nottidge who toasted the new member's health. There were in that inn cheers to many comments of Antrobus including "by the majority by which the election of East Surrey had been won, the Government had been taught a lesson they would not easily forget".
