= Sir Edmund Antrobus, 4th Baronet =

British army officer and landowner

Sir Edmund Antrobus, 4th Baronet (25 December 1848 – 11 February 1915) was a British army officer and a landowner in Wiltshire. His lands included the ancient monument of Stonehenge.

== Biography ==
Sir Edmund Antrobus, 4th Baronet, was born 25 December 1848. He was the son and heir of Sir Edmund Antrobus, 3rd Baronet, and Marianne Georgiana Dashwood, married on 11 February 1847.

He was colonel in the Grenadier Guards and took part in the 1885 Suakin Expedition in Sudan.

As owner of the ancient monument of Stonehenge, he charged the engineer William Gowland to oversee the first major restoration of the monument in 1901. In 1905, he was initiated into the Ancient Order of Druids and welcomed the first massive ceremony of this Order in Stonehenge.

He was married in 1886 to Florence Caroline Mathilde Sartoris (1856–1923). Their son and heir Edmund, a lieutenant in the Grenadier Guards, was killed at war in Belgium on 24 October 1914.

He died at Amesbury Abbey, the family seat, on 11 February 1915. His brother and heir, Sir Cosmo Antrobus, 5th Baronet (1859–1939), sold the site of Stonehenge after inheriting it from his elder brother.

== Sources ==
- Peter Clark, British Clubs and Societies, 1580–1680, Oxford, Oxford University Press, 2002.
- Ronald Hutton, Blood and Mistletoe: The History of the Druids in Britain, New Haven, Yale University Press, 2009.

Baronetage of the United Kingdom
Preceded by Edmund Antrobus	Baronet (of Antrobus Hall, Cheshire); 1899–1915	Succeeded by Cosmo Antrobus
