= Kenneth Vaus =

Kenneth Sydney Vaus CBE (30 September 1928 – 1982) was a British Liberal Party activist.

Vaus attended Haberdashers' Aske's Boys' School and the University of Sheffield, where he qualified as a dentist. He was active in the National League of Young Liberals, and was serving on its executive in 1954/55.

At the 1959 United Kingdom general election, Vaus contested East Surrey; he took second place, with 18.3% of the vote. Herbert Harris, the party's general director, praised his performance as "one of the more remarkable results for us". He stood in Hereford at the 1964 and 1966 United Kingdom general elections, and then Reigate in 1970. By this time, Vaus was serving on the Liberal Party's Executive, and he stood unsuccessfully to become the party's chair in 1970.

Vaus again contested East Surrey in the February and October 1974 United Kingdom general elections, taking 33.8% and 29.2% of the vote and second place to Geoffrey Howe. He was finally elected as the party's chair in 1973, and was still in office in 1976, when party leader Jeremy Thorpe resigned in controversial circumstances. Vaus tried to push through a rule change to allow any MP to stand for the leadership with just a single nomination, hoping that this would get his preferred candidate, Russell Johnston, onto the ballot. His proposal was heavily defeated.

In 1978, Vaus was a founder member of "Liberals Against the Pact", a group opposing the party's pact with the Labour government. He spent some time chairing the party's Finance and Administration Board, a role in which he replaced Clement Freud. In the 1981 Birthday Honours, he was made a Commander of the Order of the British Empire.

Vaus died in 1982, at the age of 54.

Party political offices
Preceded by Cyril Carr	Chairman of the Liberal Party; 1973–1976	Succeeded by Geoff Tordoff
