= William Grantham =

English lawyer and politician

Sir William Grantham Kt
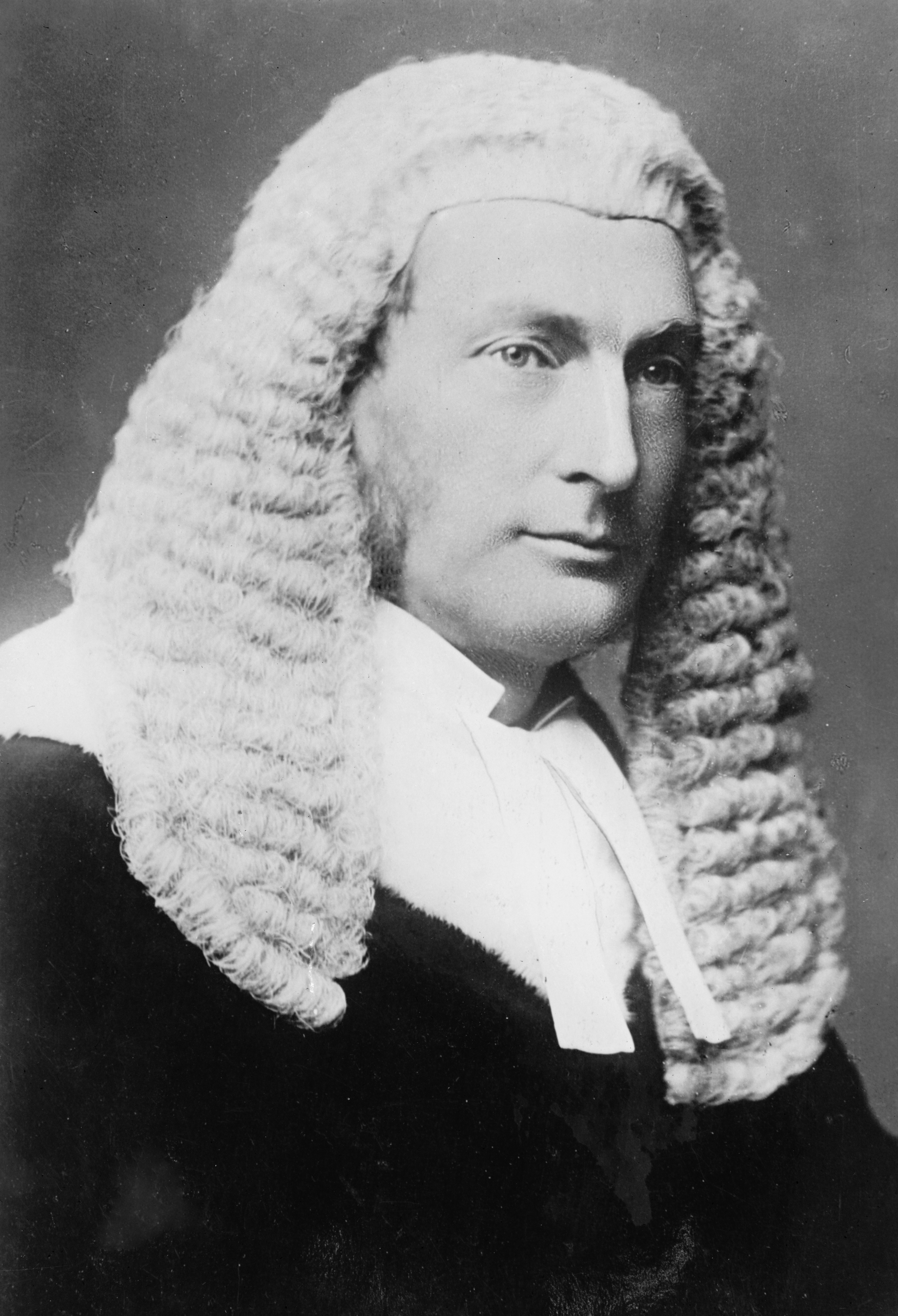

High Court of Justice, Queen's Bench Division
- In office 1886–1911

Personal details
- Born: 23 October 1835 Lewes, Sussex
- Died: 30 November 1911 (aged 76) 100 Eaton Square, London
- Party: Conservative
- Relations: Warren de la Rue (as to his son's offspring); Thomas de la Rue (as above); Alexander Grantham
- Children: William Wilson; Emma Laura; Constance Grantham; Frederick; Gertrude; Maud; Muriel Georgina.
- Profession: Barrister, politician, judge

Sir William Grantham (1835–1911) was a British barrister, Member of Parliament for 12 years for successive areas which took in Croydon then, from 1886, High Court judge.

== Biography ==
Grantham was born on 23 October 1835 in Lewes, Sussex, England to George Grantham and Sarah Grantham (née Verrall). He was educated at King's College School, and was called to the bar in 1863 at Inner Temple. He was appointed Queen's Counsel in 1877.

Grantham married Emma L Wilson on 15 February 1865 in Sussex, England. The couple had seven children. His eldest son's wife was granddaughter of British astronomer and chemist Warren de la Rue.

== Legacy ==
He was a Conservative Member of Parliament (MP) for Surrey Eastern from 1874 to 1885 and was elected as for Croydon in 1885. He was knighted that year. In parliament he spoke 184 times, the last of which in 1885, and ardently opposed Gladstone. He resigned in 1886 on appointment as a judge of the Queen's Bench Division. He came to chair the East Sussex Quarter Sessions.

As a judge he was seen as competent but with a weakness for commenting on cases in a way that brought him into conflict with various groups, a habit that eventually led to hints in the newspapers that he should retire. His tenure as a judge was mainly uncontroversial until 1906, when, co-determining petitions following the general election: for Bodmin, Maidstone and Great Yarmouth, he was seen as favouring the Conservatives. A censure motion was proposed in the House of Commons and led to a vigorous debate, but the government declined to take it further, possibly because of the precedent it would set.

Five years later, an indiscreet speech to the grand jury in Liverpool led to him being rebuked by the Prime Minister, H. H. Asquith, in the Commons, 'one of the severest ever dealt to an English judge by a minister of the crown'. He died later that year, of pneumonia, in his house, 100 Eaton Square, London, aged 76, also possessed of Barcombe Place, near Lewes, East Sussex.

His probate was resworn the next year at £233,406 (equivalent to about £23,100,000 in 2025).

== Sources ==
- Leigh Rayment's Peerage Pages

Parliament of the United Kingdom
Preceded by Peter John Locke King; James Watney	Member of Parliament for Surrey Eastern; 1874–1885; With: James Watney	Constituency abolished
New constituency	Member of Parliament for Croydon; 1885–1886	Succeeded by Sidney Herbert
