= 1871 East Surrey by-election =

UK Parliamentary by-election

The 1871 East Surrey by-election was fought on 26 August 1871.

The by-election was triggered following the death of the sitting Liberal Member of Parliament, Charles Buxton, and was won by the Conservative candidate, James Watney.

Watney sat as the second member of the two-seat constituency until it was abolished at the 1885 election.
