= James Galbraith (British politician) =

British politician (1872–1945)

The Honourable James Galbraith KC JP
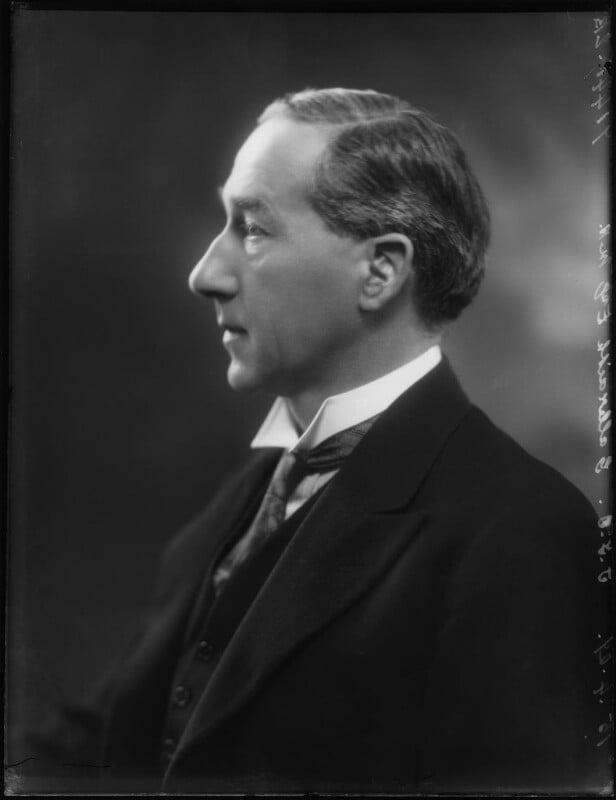
- Galbraith in 1929

Member of Parliament for East Surrey
- In office 1922–1935

Personal details
- Born: James Francis Wallace Galbraith; 1872
- Died: 29 January 1945 (aged 72–73)

James Francis Wallace Galbraith (1872 – 29 January 1945) was a British politician and judge. He represented East Surrey for the Conservative Party between 1922 and 1935.

Galbraith was educated at Oriel College, Oxford, and was elected President of the Oxford Union in 1892, narrowly defeating Evan Cotton, later a Liberal MP. After Oxford he was called to the bar at Lincoln's Inn in 1893, and practiced as a barrister for many years. He became a King's Counsel in 1919, and was elected as treasurer of the General Council of the Bar in 1921.

He contested Halifax at the January 1910 and December 1910 general elections. It was then a Liberal/Labour dominated seat, and he was clearly defeated both times. In 1922, he was selected as the prospective candidate for East Surrey, a more affluent Conservative safe seat. He won the seat with a clear majority at the 1922 general election, and held the seat until the 1935 general election.

Galbraith was expected to stand for re-election, but shortly after dissolution it was announced that he would be appointed as a county court judge in Leicester, which would render him unable to be elected to Parliament. He remained a judge until his death in 1945.
