= Charles A'Court =

Charles Henry Wyndham A'Court

Member of Parliament for Wilton
- In office 1852–1855

Personal details
- Born: October 14, 1819 Heytesbury, Wiltshire, England
- Died: October 29, 1903 (aged 84)
- Party: Liberal Party
- Spouse: Emily Currie
- Children: Two sons and two daughters
- Parent: General Charles Ashe à Court-Repington
- Education: St John's College, Cambridge
- Occupation: Politician

Charles Henry Wyndham A'Court (full name Charles Henry Wyndham A'Court Repington) (14 October 1819 – 29 October 1903) was a Liberal Party politician in the United Kingdom.

He was born the son of General Charles Ashe à Court-Repington of Heytesbury, Wiltshire and was admitted to St John's College, Cambridge, in 1837.

He was elected at the 1852 general election as Member of Parliament (MP) for Wilton in Wiltshire, but resigned his seat in 1855 when he was appointed as a special commissioner of property and income tax in Ireland. In his three years as an MP, Hansard records that he never made a speech.

He married Emily Currie in 1854 and had two sons and two daughters. His eldest son Lieutenant Colonel Charles à Court Repington was a leading Times military correspondent.

Parliament of the United Kingdom
Preceded by Viscount Somerton	Member of Parliament for Wilton; 1852 – 1855	Succeeded by Edmund Antrobus
