= Sir Edmund Antrobus, 3rd Baronet =

British politician

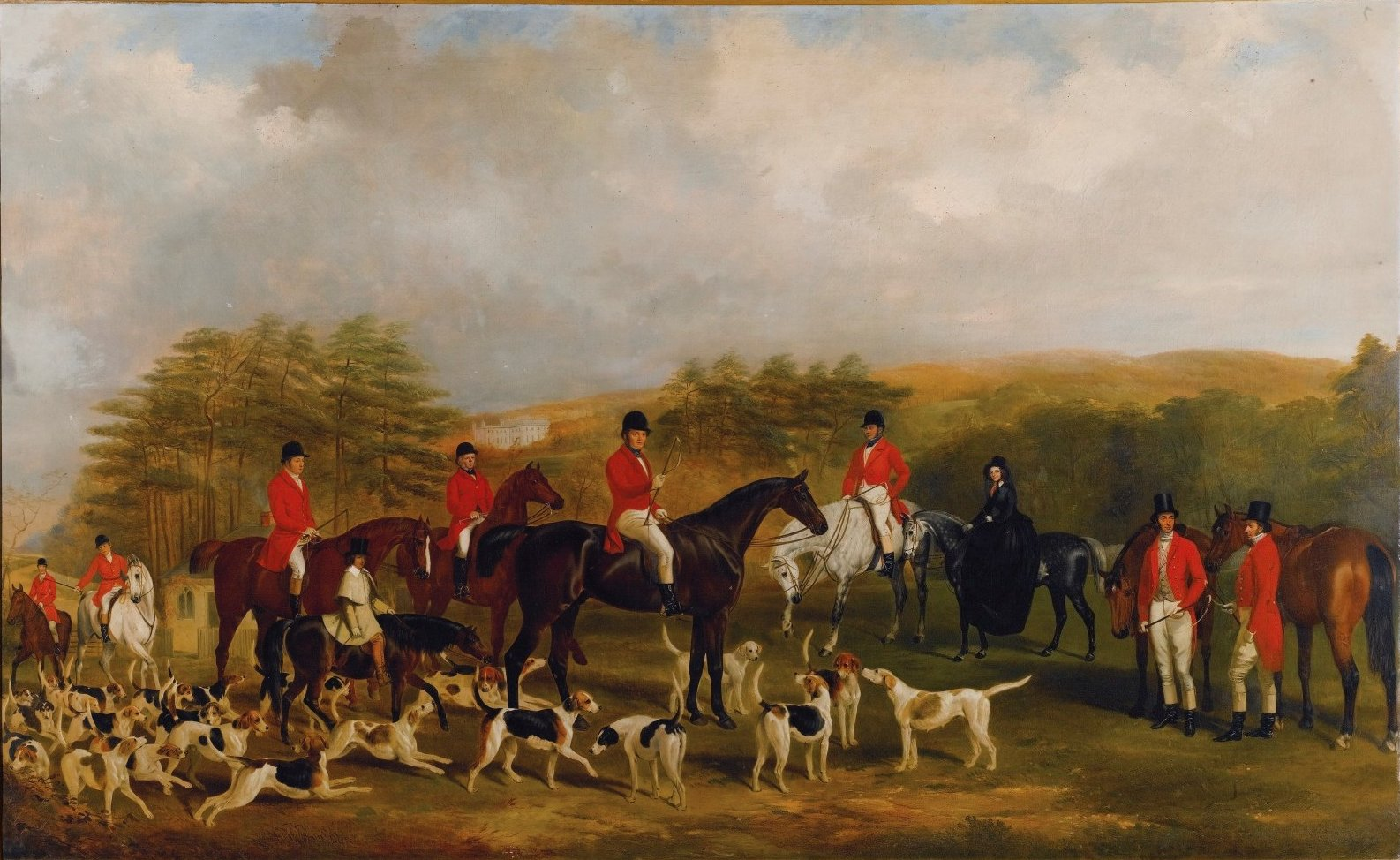
Sir Edmund and the Old Surrey Fox Hounds at the Foot of Addington Hills by William Barraud (1810–1851)

Sir Edmund Antrobus, 3rd Baronet, DL (3 September 1818 – 1 April 1899) was a British politician who sat as Member of Parliament for Surrey Eastern for six years as a Conservative, and Wilton for 22 years as a Whig/Liberal.

== Life and career ==
Sir Edmund was the eldest son of Sir Edmund Antrobus, 2nd Baronet, and Anne Lindsay of Antrobus Hall (Cheshire) and Amesbury Abbey (Wiltshire). He was educated at St John's College, Cambridge. The elder Sir Edmund was a slave-owner, who had a number of sugar plantations in Jamaica, British Guiana and St Kitts. At the time of emancipation in the 1830s, the British government compensated him for the ownership of over 500 slaves on eight estates in the West Indies.

The Antrobus estate in Wiltshire included the ancient monument of Stonehenge. During his lifetime, Antrobus refused to allow the government agency for the preservation of ancient monuments to even look at the property. It was rumoured that an anonymous buyer wanted to buy the stones and take them to the United States; if Antrobus had accepted the offer, no-one could have stopped him. His portrait was painted by animal painter William Barraud, who showed him hunting with the Old Surrey Fox Hounds at Addington, Surrey.

Antrobus was elected as one of two Members for East Surrey in 1841, and won one re-election, then in 1847 both MPs were unseated by Liberal candidates. At a by-election at Wilton in March 1855, he was elected unopposed as a Peelite, replacing an incumbent from the same party, Charles A'Court, who had stood down to serve as a Special Commissioner in Ireland. He was re-elected as a Peelite in 1857 and as a Liberal in 1859, 1865, and 1868, and 1874, again being unopposed at all these elections. In 1877 he stood down, prompting the 1877 Wilton by-election, at which the Conservatives gained the seat.

He succeeded to the Baronetcy upon the death of his father on 4 May 1870. He was High Sheriff of Wiltshire in 1880. On his death the Baronetcy passed to his eldest son and namesake, Sir Edmund Antrobus, 4th Baronet.

== Family ==
Antrobus married on 11 February 1847 Marianne Georgiana Dashwood, daughter of Sir George Dashwood, 4th Baronet, of Kirtlington. The Dowager Lady Antrobus died at her London residence on 3 February 1903. They had six children, including:

- Louisa Emma Antrobus, who in 1874 married Admiral Sir Algernon Heneage (1833–1915)
- Edmund Antrobus (1848–1915), who succeeded as 4th Baronet
- Robert Lindsay Antrobus
- Cosmo Gordon Antrobus (1859–1939), who succeeded his brother as 5th Baronet,
- Florence Antrobus

== Sources ==
- thePeerage.com
- Leigh Rayment's list of baronets
- Leigh Rayment's Historical List of MPs

Parliament of the United Kingdom
Preceded by Richard Alsager; Henry Kemble	Member of Parliament for East Surrey; 1841 – 1847; With: Henry Kemble	Succeeded by Peter John Locke King; Thomas Alcock
Preceded by Charles Henry Wyndham A'Court	Member of Parliament for Wilton; 1855–1877	Succeeded by Sidney Herbert
Baronetage of the United Kingdom
Preceded by Edmund Antrobus	Baronet (of Antrobus Hall, Cheshire); 1870–1899	Succeeded by Edmund Antrobus
