= Sir Edward Antrobus, 8th Baronet =

South African first-class cricketer (born 1938)

Sir Edward Antrobus
- Arms of Sir Edward Antrobus

Personal information
- Born: 28 September 1938 (age 88); Cape Province, South Africa
- Batting: Right handed
- Bowling: Leg-break

Domestic team information
- Years: Team
- 1963: Cambridge University
- FC debut: 15 May 1963 Cambridge University v Leicestershire
- Last FC: 18 May 1963 Cambridge University v Nottinghamshire

Career statistics
Competition	First-class
Matches	2
Runs scored	53
Batting average	13.25
100s/50s	0/0
Top score	31
Balls bowled	18
Wickets	0
Bowling average	–
5 wickets in innings	–
10 wickets in match	–
Best bowling	–
Catches/stumpings	1/–
- Source: CricketArchive, 27 September 2008

Sir Edward Philip Antrobus, 8th Baronet (born 28 September 1938) is a South African former first-class cricketer.

== Personal ==
Born in South Africa, he graduated from Witwatersrand University in 1961 with a Bachelor of Science in engineering. He graduated from Magdalene College, Cambridge in 1965 with a Bachelor of Arts and in 1969 with a Master of Arts. He succeeded to the title of 8th Baronet Antrobus, of Antrobus, county palatine of Chester on 1 August 1995.

== Cricketing career ==
Antrobus made two appearances for Cambridge University in 1963 as a right-handed batsman and leg spin bowler. He scored 31 and 22 on debut against Leicestershire but was twice out without scoring in his second, and final, game against Nottinghamshire. He bowled three overs in total without taking a wicket. His uncle, Geoffrey Antrobus, also played two games for Cambridge University in 1925.

Baronetage of the United Kingdom
Preceded by Philip Antrobus	Baronet (of Antrobus); 1995–present	Incumbent
