= James Watney Jr =

English businessman and politician (1832–1886)

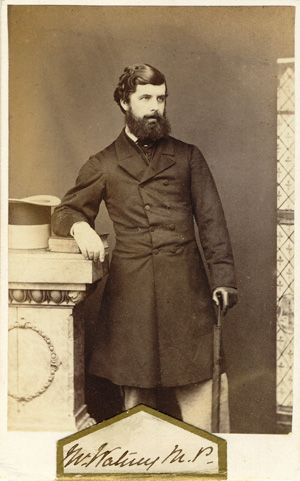
James Watney junior (1832–1886)

James Watney Jr. (19 May 1832 – 2 November 1886) was a member of the Watney family and a Conservative Member of Parliament for East Surrey.

== Family and early life ==
Born in 1832, Watney was the eldest son of the brewer James Watney and his wife Rebecca Spurrell. His youngest brother was the physician Herbert Watney.

Watney played first-class cricket for Surrey (1851) and the Marylebone Cricket Club (1851–1852).

He married Blanche Maria Georgiana, daughter of Frederick Salmon Burrell, on 8 July 1856 and lived at Haling Park in Croydon, Beddington in Surrey. and Thorney House, Palace Gate, in Kensington. He had three children: Florence Blanche Watney (1857–1863), Vernon James Watney (1860–1928) and Claude Watney (1868–1919).

== Business and political career ==
In 1856 Watney and his brother Norman joined their father as partners in the Stag Brewery in Pimlico. The firm, then known as Elliot, Watney & Co., changed its name to James Watney & Co. in 1858 following the retirement of John Lettsom Elliott. Watney's father kept the management almost entirely to himself until his death in 1884, and the following year Watney & Co. Ltd. was established as a private limited company.

Watney contested the 1871 by-election in the East Surrey constituency as a Conservative, following the death of the Liberal MP and fellow brewer Charles Buxton. According to the Birmingham Daily Post, "he ... stood on the 'Beer and Bible' platform, and carried what had always been regarded as a safe Liberal seat by a swinging majority". He sat as the second member of the two-seat constituency until it was abolished at the 1885 election, making 61 contributions in the House of Commons between 1872 and 1882, but none in 1875.

Watney served as Master of the Mercers' Company in 1879.

He died on 2 November 1886 at Englemere House in Ascot, Berkshire, outliving his father by 16 months. His will was proved on its fourth reswearing owing to minor alterations and final accounting, and his estate was valued at £1,309,245 (equivalent to about £150,600,000 in 2025). His widow died on 3 February 1915.

Watney's burial, held at Brookwood Cemetery on 6 November, was attended by a large number of mourners, including staff of the Stag Brewery.

Parliament of the United Kingdom
Preceded by Charles Buxton; Peter John Locke King	Member of Parliament for East Surrey; 1871–1885; With: Peter John Locke King, to 1874; William Grantham, from 1874	Constituency abolished
