= Thomas Hopper (architect) =

English architect

- Born: 1776
- Died: 1856 (aged 79–80)
- Occupation: Architect
- Known for: Country houses across southern England

Thomas Hopper (1776–1856) was an English architect of the late 18th and early 19th centuries, much favoured by King George IV, and particularly notable for his work on country houses across southern England, with occasional forays further afield, into Wales and Ireland (especially Ulster).

He was involved with improvements to the Shire Hall in Monmouth under "Royal assent", where he and Edward Haycock made the building extend down Agincourt Street, creating room for a new staircase and larger courts. Hopper took up residence in Monnow Street in Monmouth whilst this was in progress.

In 1840 he exhibited designs for Butterton Hall in Staffordshire. This gothic building lasted until the First World War when it was demolished due to misuse.

Hopper died in 1856.

== Projects ==
- Leigh Court, North Somerset (1814)
- Penrhyn Castle, Llandegai, Bangor, North Wales (1822–1837)
- Kentwell Hall, Suffolk (1820s)
- Arthur's Club, 69–70 St James's Street, London (after 1940 the Carlton) (1826–1827)
- Llanover House, Abergavenny, Wales (1827–1837; demolished 1935)
- Improvements to the Shire Hall, Monmouth (1829)
- Bryn Bras Castle, Llanrug, North Wales (1829–1835)
- Margam Castle, South Wales (1830–1840)
- Wivenhoe House, Essex (1846–1853)
- Hospital buildings at St Mary's Hospital, Paddington, London (1851)
- Alscot Park, Warwickshire
- Amesbury Abbey, Wiltshire (1834–1840 and 1859–1860): a country house named for the nearby former abbey; Grade I listed
- Boreham House, Essex
- Gothic Conservatory at Carlton House, London, demolished
- Crichel House, Dorset, alterations
- Danbury Place, Essex
- Easton Lodge, Essex
- Englefield House, Berkshire
- Gosford Castle, County Armagh
- Chapel at Stansted Park, West Sussex
- Glemham House, Great Glenham, Suffolk (1814)
- Terling Place, Essex (1818–1824): alterations
- Works at Windsor Castle
- Gothic Ballroom at Slane Castle, County Meath, Ireland
- Entrance lodge at Dromoland Castle, County Clare, Ireland
- Woolverstone Hall, Suffolk: extension and remodelling
- Rood Ashton House, Wiltshire: extension and remodelling; almost all demolished in the 1970s

== Gallery of architectural works ==
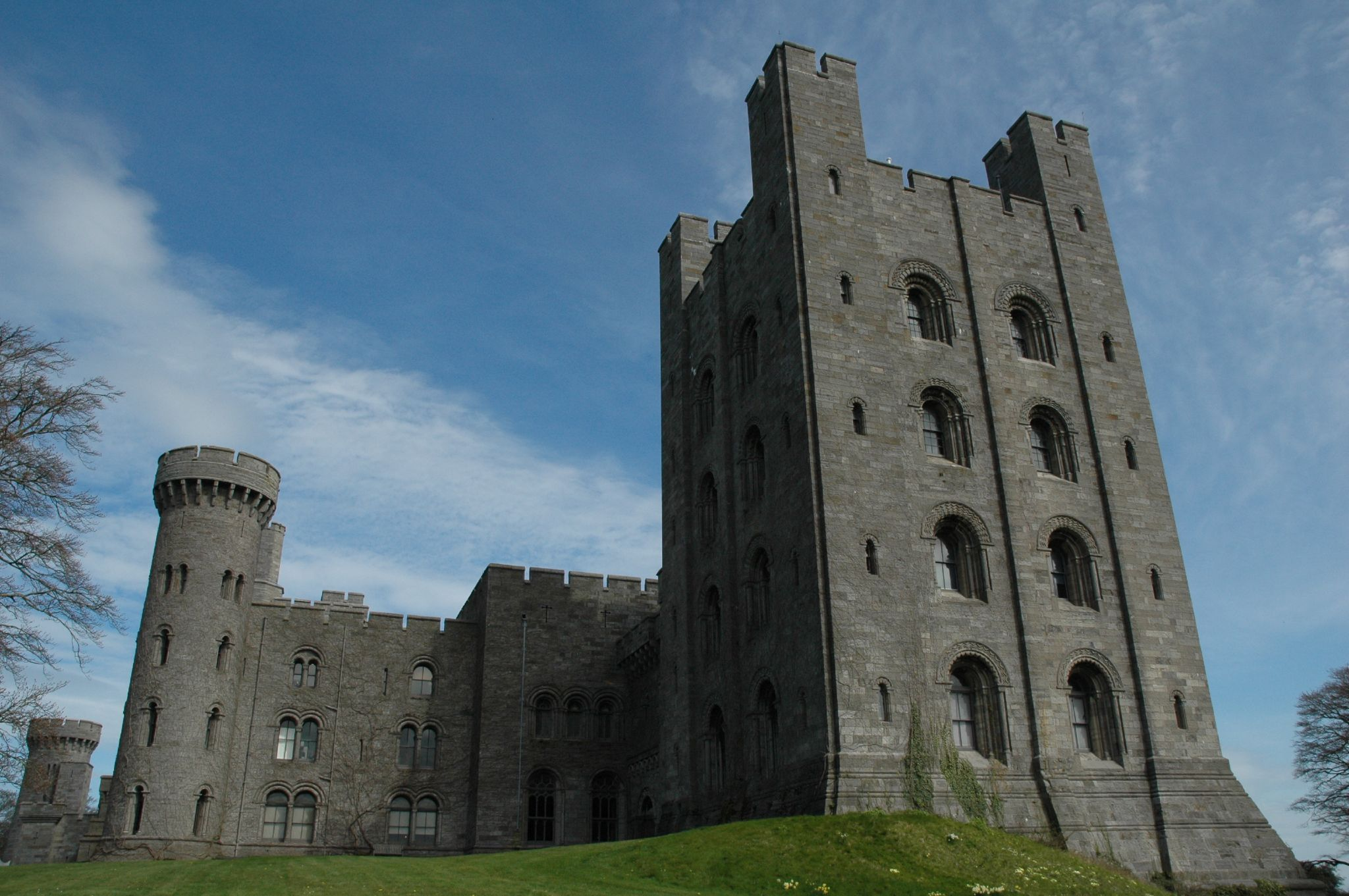
Penrhyn Castle, south front

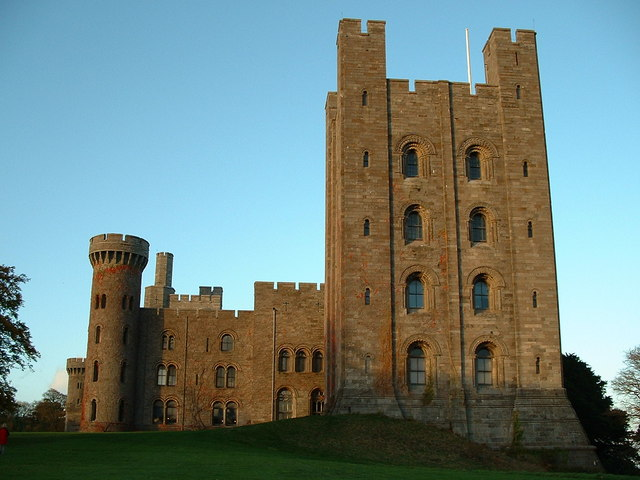
Penrhyn Castle, south front

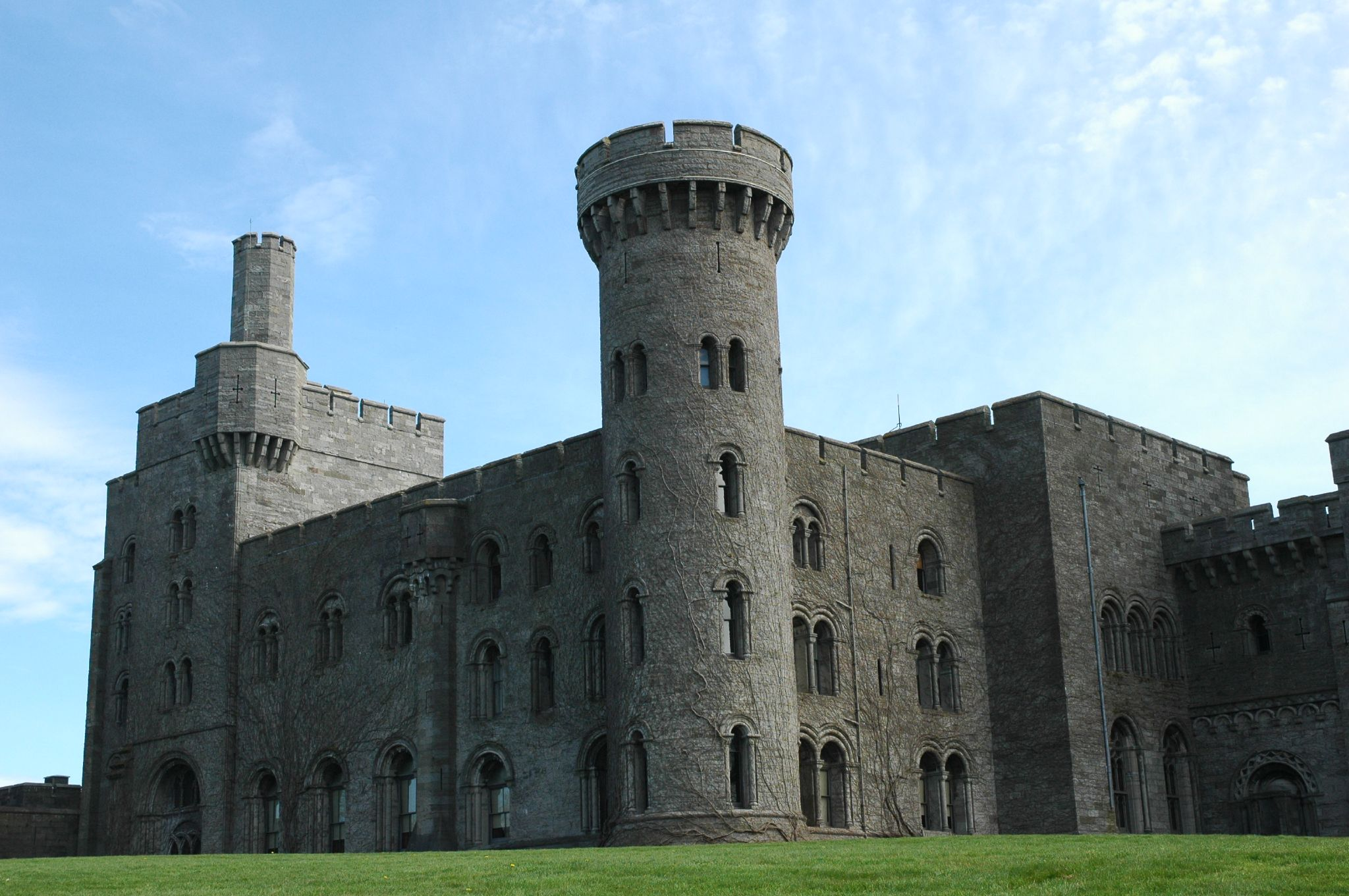
Penrhyn Castle, centre of west front

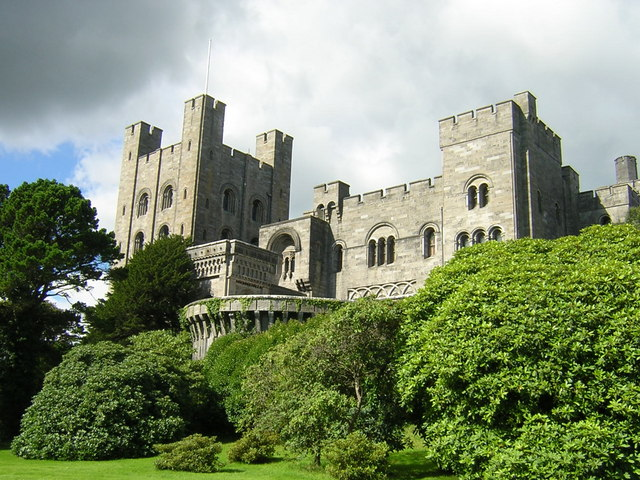
Penrhyn Castle, east front

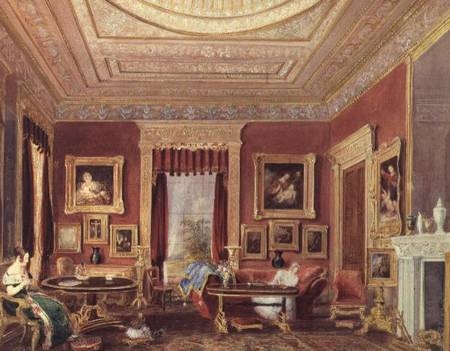
The Drawing Room, Leigh Court

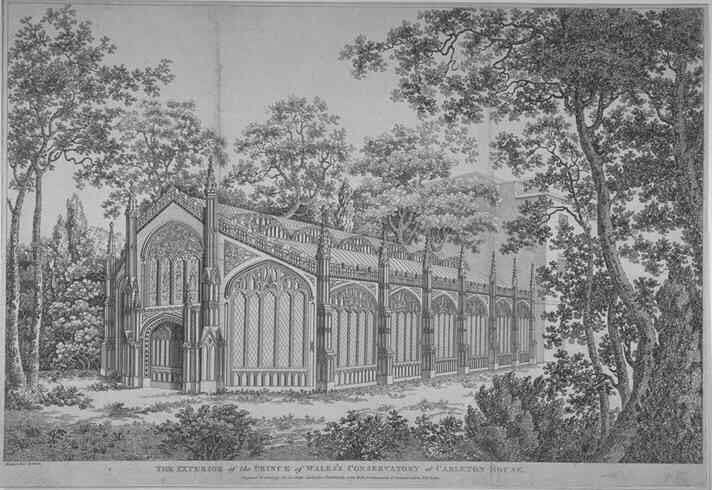
The Conservatory exterior, Carlton House, London

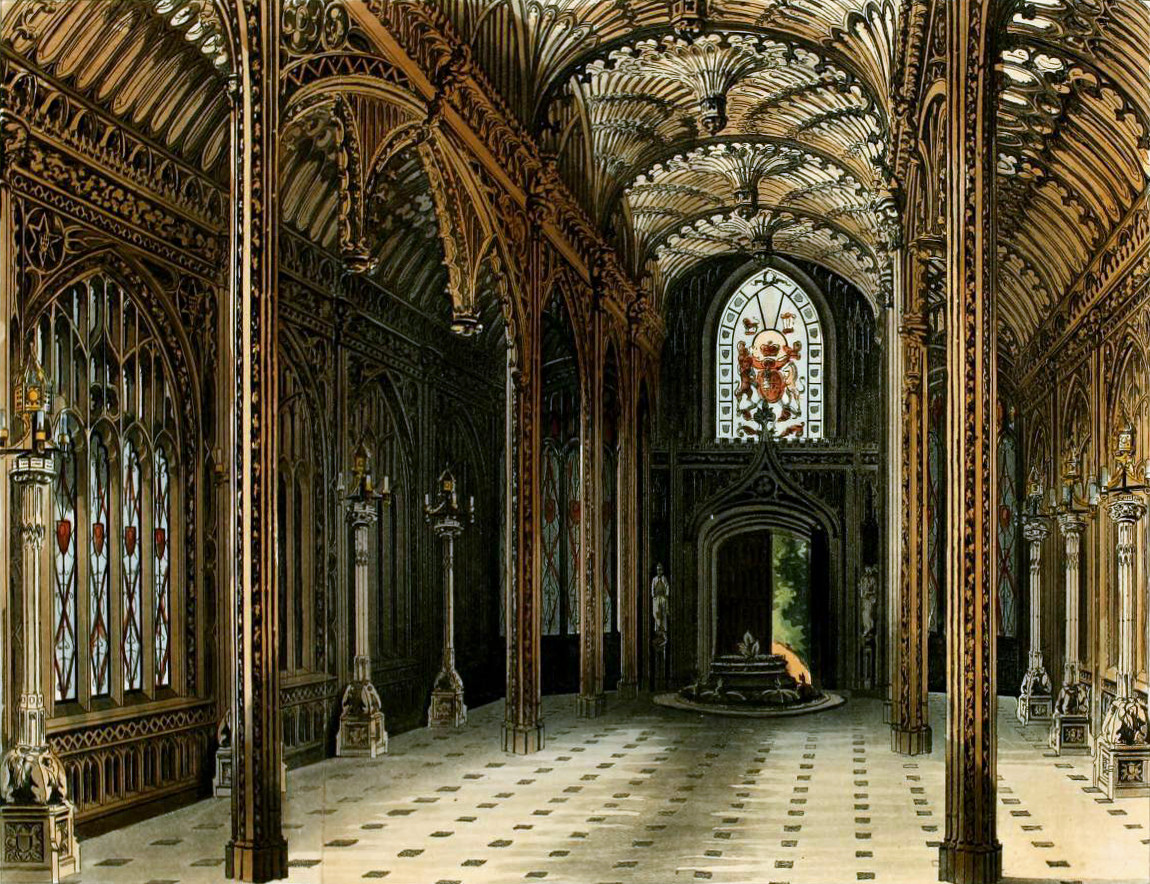
The Conservatory interior, Carlton House, London

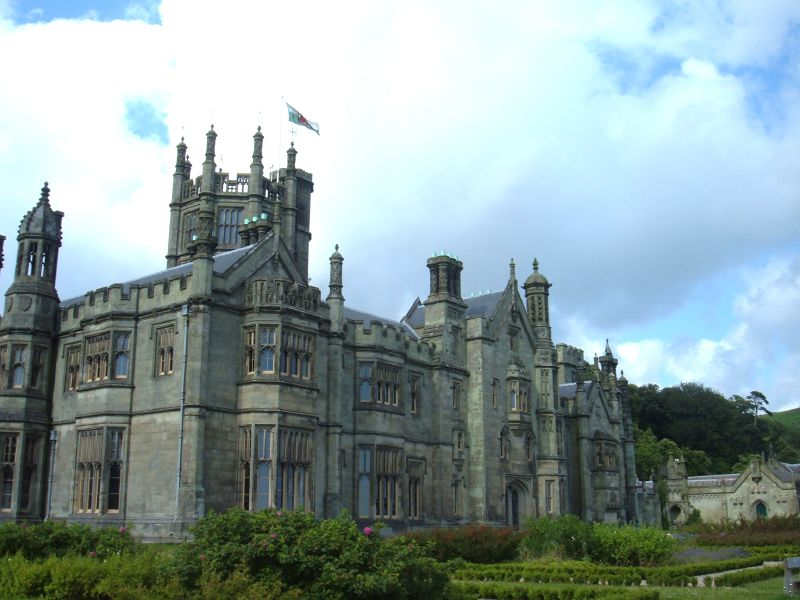
Garden front, Margam Castle

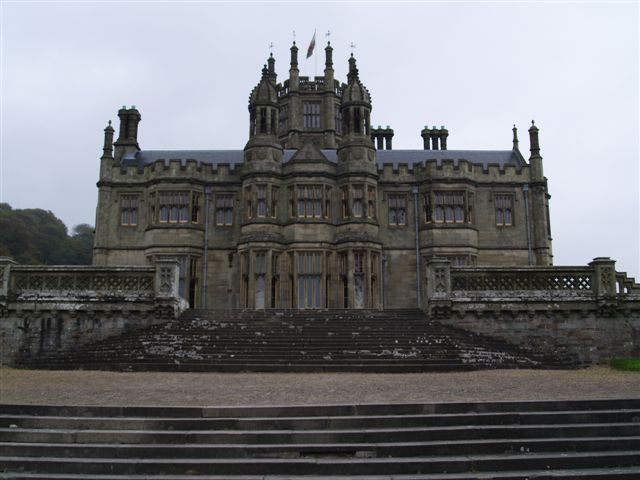
West front, Margam Castle

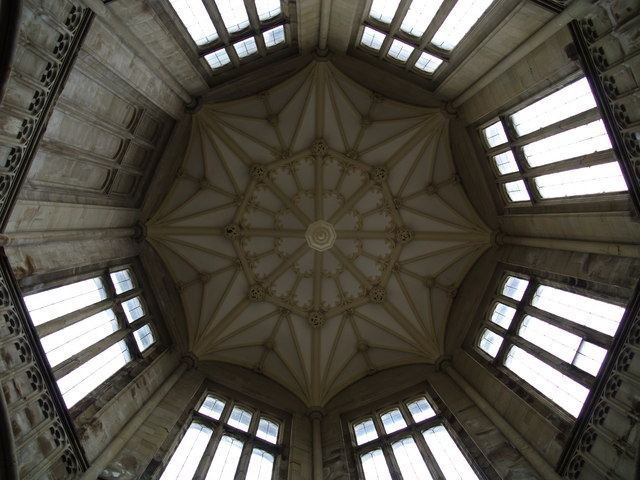
Lantern above main staircase, Margam Castle

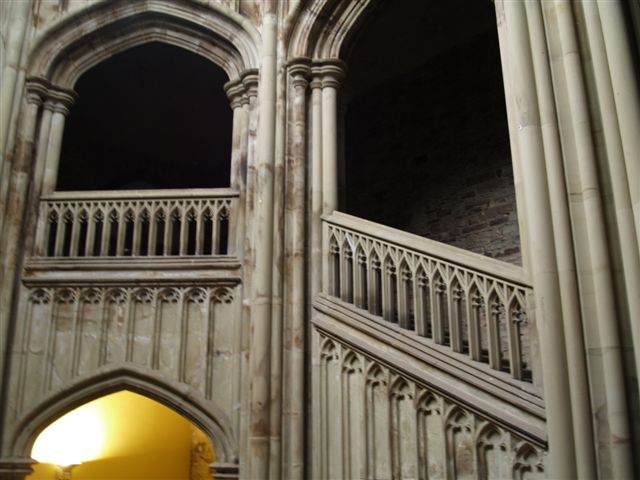
Main staircase, Margam Castle

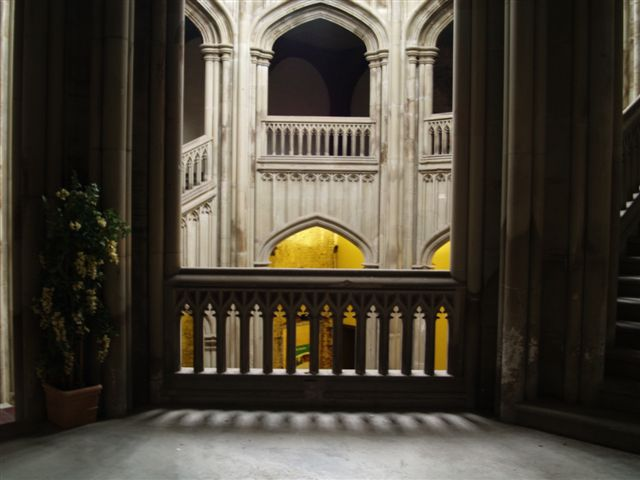
Main staircase, Margam Castle
