= East Surrey (constituency) =

Parliamentary constituency in the United Kingdom, 1918 onwards

- County constituency for the House of Commons
- Interactive map of boundaries from 2024
- Boundary of East Surrey in South East England
- County: Surrey
- Electorate: 73,145 (2023)
- Major settlements: Caterham, Whyteleafe, Warlingham, Lingfield, Woldingham, Godstone, Oxted, Limpsfield, Tatsfield

Current constituency
- Created: 1918
- Member of Parliament: Claire Coutinho (Conservative)
- Seats: One
- Created from: eastern parts of: Reigate (Surrey S.E.); Wimbledon (Surrey N.E.)

1832–1885
- Seats: Two
- Type of constituency: County constituency
- Created from: Bletchingley, Gatton and Surrey
- Replaced by: in the metropolis: Croydon; Clapham; Dulwich; Battersea; Wandsworth to the south Reigate or S.E. division (included Godstone and other southern areas of the later East Surrey creation); Wimbledon or N.E. division (included Caterham, Chelsham, Farleigh, Whyteleafe and Warlingham of the later East Surrey creation)
- During its existence contributed to new seat(s) of: Mid Surrey (in 1868)

East Surrey is a constituency (Note: A county constituency (for the purposes of election expenses and type of returning officer)) represented in the House of Commons of the UK Parliament since 2019 by Claire Coutinho, a Conservative who formerly served as Secretary of State for Energy Security and Net Zero. The seat covers an affluent area in the English county of Surrey.

Since its creation in 1918, East Surrey has elected a Conservative MP at every general election. Before the 2024 general election, this Conservative victory took the form of an absolute majority (over 50% of the vote) at every general election, one of few seats that can make this claim, and is therefore regarded as a Conservative safe seat. Its greatest share of the vote for any opposition candidate was 33.75% in February 1974. (Note: As with all constituencies, the constituency elects one Member of Parliament (MP) by the first-past-the-post system of election at least every five years.)

== Boundaries ==
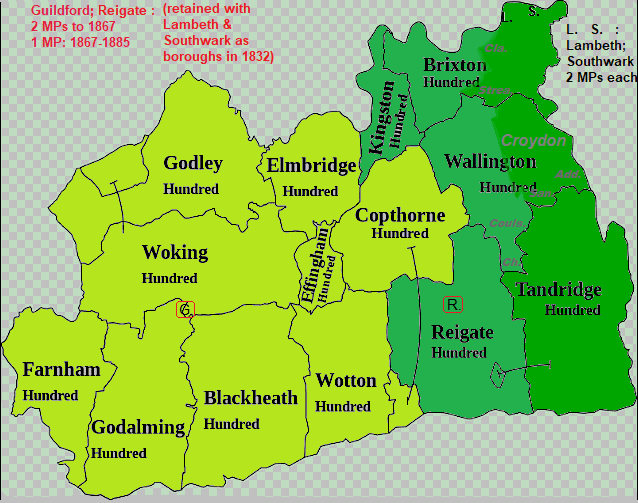
Latter version of this area in its earlier existence (1867–1885) in darkest green, the stark dark/light split shows the preceding simpler East–west division of the county, dark shades being the former (1832–1867) version of that two-member area.

1832–1868: The Hundreds of Brixton, Kingston, Reigate, Tandridge and Wallington.

1868–1885: The Hundred of Tandridge, and so much of the Hundred of Wallington as included and lay to the east of the parishes of Croydon and Sanderstead, and so much of the Hundred of Brixton as included and lay to the east of the parishes of Streatham, Clapham and Lambeth.

For period to 1918 see completely new single-member Wimbledon and Reigate seats, also termed N.E. and S.E. Divisions of Surrey.

1918–1950: The Urban Districts of Caterham, and Coulsdon and Purley, and the Rural District of Godstone.

1950–1974: The Urban Districts of Caterham and Warlingham, and Coulsdon and Purley.

1974–1983: The Urban District of Caterham and Warlingham, and the Rural District of Godstone.

1983–1997: The District of Tandridge. (Equivalent to the above)

1997–2010: The District of Tandridge, and the Borough of Reigate and Banstead wards of Horley East and Horley West.

2010–2024: As above plus Horley Central.

2024–present: The Borough of Reigate and Banstead ward of Hooley, Merstham & Netherne, and the District of Tandridge.

Electorate reduced to bring it within the permitted range by transferring Horley to the new constituency of Dorking and Horley. To partly compensate, the Reigate and Banstead ward of Hooley, Merstham & Netherne was transferred from the Reigate constituency.

== Constituency profile ==
East Surrey is a constituency in the inner Home counties. Until 2024 it combined the town of Horley with Surrey's District of Tandridge, which is made up of Caterham and commuter settlements, farming and retirement homes. Horley is one of two towns adjoining London Gatwick Airport and is part of Reigate and Banstead borough. The constituency area borders the London Borough of Croydon to the north, the county of Kent to the east, and the county of West Sussex to the south.

The northern part of the seat is inside the M25 motorway: Caterham, Whyteleafe and Warlingham form green-buffered, elevated commuter belt, with good rail connections to Central London and well connected by various modes of transport to Croydon. Elsewhere, the seat is more rural and includes a low part of the Greensand Ridge and features woodland and many golf courses.

The Conservatives have prevented any opposition party achieving more than 33.75% of the vote since 1974, even at the 1997 and 2001 United Kingdom general elections when opposition was greatest nationally in Conservative safe seats.

Most local wards are won by the Conservatives with the Liberal Democrats often picking up seats somewhere in the dual-council system, particularly in Whyteleafe or Caterham Valley. As is typical in seats of this kind, the Labour vote is typically very modest. The party finished in third place at each election between 1959 and 2015. In 2017 the party's candidate polled second, in a poorer showing for the Liberal Democrats and the party's "Corbyn Surge". In the 2019 election the Liberal Democrats retook second place and Labour fell to third. The area saw a majority vote in favour of Brexit in the 2016 EU Referendum. Conversely, the then MP Sam Gyimah opposed Brexit, especially Prime Minister Boris Johnson's Brexit deal, and later joined the Liberal Democrats after being suspended from the Tories.

== History ==
=== Victorian dual-member constituency 1832–1885 ===
The 13th century-created, dual-member constituency for the county took in over a third of today's Greater London and its population far exceeded the average for a county. It was recognised as needing or meriting four MPs, so division, under the Reform Act 1832.

The territory was incepted and absorbed two of Surrey's three rotten boroughs: Bletchingley and Gatton, which were abolished under the act. It overlapped the boroughs of:

- Reigate (its double representation halved, which kept a narrow franchise and completely abolished 1868).
- Lambeth, to be subdivided in 1885.
- Southwark, to be subdivided in 1885.

Often known as the Eastern Division of Surrey or Surrey Eastern, its enfranchised adult male property owners elected two MPs by bloc vote (a voter has a vote for each current vacancy). Notable outer reaches, clockwise from north, were Southwark, Rotherhithe, Addington, Lingfield, Charlwood, Buckland, Surrey, Cheam, Kingston upon Thames and Richmond (see map, top right).

The area was split in two, doubling representation, under the Second Reform Act, starting from the 1868 general election; the area was still under-represented, as shown by the setting up of a net increase of 14 metropolitan seats in 1885.

The Redistribution of Seats Act 1885 went much further than the 1832 Act towards equal representation around the country. It here reflected growth in the county's population. Thus for elections from 1885 dual-member West, Mid Surrey and East Surrey dissipated to allow the creation of 16 rather than just 2 metropolitan Surrey seats (Lambeth and Southwark which saw subdivision) and these "county" seats:

1. The North-Western or Chertsey Division (usually recorded as Chertsey, Surrey N.W. or North-West) – included Woking and Egham
2. The South-Western or Guildford Division (as style shown above) – included Godalming, Farnham and surrounds
3. The South-Eastern or Reigate Division (as style shown above) – included Dorking sessional division save for two parishes in No. 4.
4. The Mid or Epsom Division (as style shown above) – included Kingston's southern and eastern sessional division components
5. The Kingston Division (invariably Kingston or Kingston-upon-Thames) – included Richmond
6. The North-Eastern or Wimbledon Division (as style shown above) – included sessional division of Croydon except its core and north in the Metropolis; plus Caterham, Chelsham, Farley, Warlingham.

=== Seat created in 1918 ===
In 1918 the constituency was re-established in dwarf form, taking rural and nascent very suburban parts of South East Surrey ("Reigate") and North East Surrey ("Wimbledon"), and for the first time electing only one MP. It covered from the south of Croydon to the Kent and West Sussex borders. It was to remain centred on Lingfield, Oxted, Limpsfield, Godstone, Caterham and Woldingham.

In 1950 East Surrey lost Addington parish on the eastern fringe of Croydon to the 1918-formed Croydon South seat, and its southern half to Reigate. In 1974 the north-west of the area became part of Croydon South, reflecting the 1965 transfer of Purley and Coulsdon to the London Borough of Croydon in the new Greater London which then replaced the London County Council. The seat regained essentially the same land as it had lost to Reigate in 1950. Its MP until 1974, William Clark, won the new Croydon South in that year's February election. Clark's successor, Geoffrey Howe, later became Chancellor of the Exchequer and Foreign Secretary in Margaret Thatcher's cabinet.

== Members of Parliament ==
=== MPs 1832–1885 ===
Election	First member	1st Party	Main home	Second member	2nd Party	Main home
1832	John Ivatt Briscoe	Whig	Botleys, Chertsey	Aubrey Beauclerk	Radical	St Leonards Lodge (Leonardslee), Horsham, Sussex and Ardglass Castle, County Down
1835	Richard Alsager	Conservative	Unknown house, Upper Tooting	Aubrey Beauclerk	Radical	St Leonards Lodge (Leonardslee), Horsham, Sussex and Ardglass Castle, County Down
1837	Richard Alsager	Conservative	Unknown house, Upper Tooting	Henry Kemble	Conservative	Grove Hill, Camberwell
1841 by-election	Edmund Antrobus	Conservative	Antrobus Hall, Cheshire and Amesbury Abbey, Wiltshire	Henry Kemble	Conservative	Grove Hill, Camberwell
1847	Peter Locke King	Whig	Brooklands, Weybridge and 38 Dover Street, St James's	Thomas Alcock	Whig	Ringwood Lodge, Redhill/Reigate
1859	Peter Locke King	Liberal	Brooklands, Weybridge and 38 Dover Street, St James's	Thomas Alcock	Liberal	Ringwood Lodge, Redhill/Reigate
1865	Peter Locke King	Liberal	Brooklands, Weybridge and 38 Dover Street, St James's	Charles Buxton	Liberal	Foxwarren Park in West Surrey
1871 by-election	Peter Locke King	Liberal	Brooklands, Weybridge and 38 Dover Street, St James's	James Watney	Conservative	Haling Park, Beddington, Croydon and Thorney House, Palace Gate, Kensington
1874	William Grantham	Conservative	100 Eaton Square, Westminster and Barcombe Place, Sussex	James Watney	Conservative	Haling Park, Beddington, Croydon and Thorney House, Palace Gate, Kensington
1885	Constituency abolished					

=== MPs since 1918 ===
Election	Member	Party	Notes
Constituency recreated
1918	Stuart Coats	Conservative	Member for Wimbledon (1916–1918)
1922	James Galbraith	Conservative	
1935	Charles Emmott	Conservative	
1945	Michael Astor	Conservative	
1951	Charles Doughty	Conservative	
1970	William Clark	Conservative	Contested Croydon South following redistribution
Constituency split, majority renamed Croydon South
February 1974	Geoffrey Howe	Conservative	Deputy Prime Minister of the United Kingdom (1989–1990); Foreign Secretary (1983–1989); Chancellor of the Exchequer (1979–1983); Member for Reigate (1970–1974)
1992	Peter Ainsworth	Conservative	
2010	Sam Gyimah	Conservative	
September 2019	Sam Gyimah	Liberal Democrats	
2019	Claire Coutinho	Conservative	Secretary of State for Energy Security and Net Zero (2023–24)

== Election results 1974–present ==
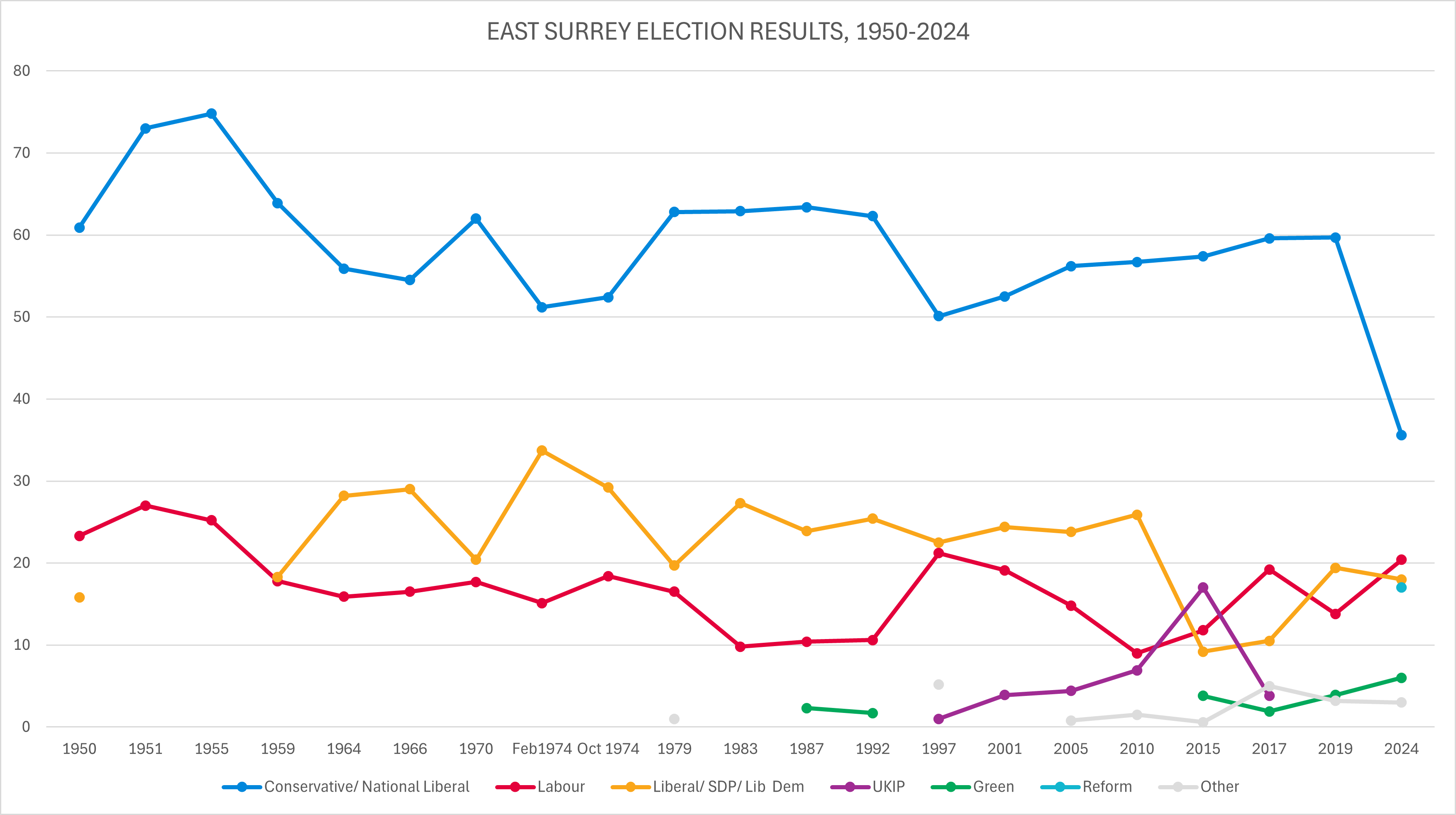
Election results 1950–2024

=== Elections in the 2020s ===
General election 2024: East Surrey
Party	Candidate	Votes	%	±%
Conservative	Claire Coutinho	17,502	35.6	−24.7
Labour	Tom Bowell	10,052	20.4	+7.2
Liberal Democrats	Claire Malcomson	8,833	18.0	−2.4
Reform	Chris Scott	8,380	17.0	New
Green	Shasha Khan	2,957	6.0	+3.0
Independent	Judy Moore	1,145	2.3	New
Monster Raving Loony	Martin Hogbin	327	0.7	−0.3
Majority		7,450	15.2	−25.1
Turnout		49,196	67.1	−3.3
Registered electors		73,307		
Conservative hold		Swing	−16.0	

=== Elections in the 2010s ===
2019 notional result
Party	Vote	%
Conservative	31,063	60.3
Liberal Democrats	10,498	20.4
Labour	6,787	13.2
Green	1,534	3.0
Others	1,593	3.1
Turnout	51,475	70.4
Electorate	73,145	

General election 2019: East Surrey
Party	Candidate	Votes	%	±%
Conservative	Claire Coutinho	35,624	59.7	+0.1
Liberal Democrats	Alexander Ehmann	11,584	19.4	+8.9
Labour	Frances Rehal	8,247	13.8	−5.4
Green	Joseph Booton	2,340	3.9	+2.0
Independent	Helena Windsor	1,374	2.3	N/A
Monster Raving Loony	Martin Hogbin	521	0.9	New
Majority		24,040	40.3	−0.1
Turnout		59,690	72.1	−2.8
Registered electors				
Conservative hold		Swing		

General election 2017: East Surrey
Party	Candidate	Votes	%	±%
Conservative	Sam Gyimah	35,310	59.6	+2.2
Labour	Hitesh Tailor	11,396	19.2	+7.4
Liberal Democrats	David Lee	6,197	10.5	+1.3
Independent	Andy Parr	2,973	5.0	New
UKIP	Helena Windsor	2,227	3.8	−13.2
Green	Benedict Southworth	1,100	1.9	−1.9
Majority		23,914	40.4	0.0
Turnout		59,203	74.9	+4.5
Registered electors				
Conservative hold		Swing	−2.6	

General election 2015: East Surrey
Party	Candidate	Votes	%	±%
Conservative	Sam Gyimah	32,211	57.4	+0.7
UKIP	Helena Windsor	9,553	17.0	+10.1
Labour	Matt Wilson	6,627	11.8	+2.8
Liberal Democrats	David Lee	5,189	9.2	−16.7
Green	Nicola Dodgson	2,159	3.8	New
Independent	Sandy Pratt	364	0.6	−0.1
Majority		22,658	40.4	+9.6
Turnout		56,103	70.4	−0.7
Registered electors				
Conservative hold		Swing	−4.7	

General election 2010: East Surrey
Party	Candidate	Votes	%	±%
Conservative	Sam Gyimah	31,007	56.7	+0.6
Liberal Democrats	David Lee	14,133	25.9	+2.0
Labour	Matt Rodda	4,925	9.0	−5.8
UKIP	Helena Windsor	3,770	6.9	+2.5
Monster Raving Loony	Martin Hogbin	422	0.8	New
Independent	Sandy Pratt	383	0.7	New
Majority		16,874	30.8	−1.4
Turnout		54,640	71.1	+4.5
Registered electors				
Conservative hold		Swing		

=== Elections in the 2000s ===
General election 2005: East Surrey
Party	Candidate	Votes	%	±%
Conservative	Peter Ainsworth	27,659	56.2	+3.7
Liberal Democrats	Jeremy Pursehouse	11,738	23.8	−0.6
Labour	James Bridge	7,288	14.8	−4.3
UKIP	Tony Stone	2,158	4.4	+0.5
Legalise Cannabis	Winston Matthews	410	0.8	New
Majority		15,921	32.4	+4.3
Turnout		49,253	66.6	+3.3
Registered electors				
Conservative hold		Swing	+2.1	

General election 2001: East Surrey
Party	Candidate	Votes	%	±%
Conservative	Peter Ainsworth	24,706	52.5	+2.4
Liberal Democrats	Jeremy Pursehouse	11,503	24.4	+1.9
Labour	Jo Tanner	8,994	19.1	−2.1
UKIP	Tony Stone	1,846	3.9	+2.9
Majority		13,203	28.1	+0.5
Turnout		47,049	63.3	−11.3
Registered electors				
Conservative hold		Swing		

=== Elections in the 1990s ===
General election 1997: East Surrey
Party	Candidate	Votes	%	±%
Conservative	Peter Ainsworth	27,389	50.1	−10.9
Liberal Democrats	Belinda Ford	12,296	22.5	−4.4
Labour	David Ross	11,573	21.2	+10.7
Referendum	Michael Sydney	2,656	4.9	New
UKIP	Tony Stone	569	1.0	New
Natural Law	Susan Bartrum	173	0.3	New
Majority		15,093	27.6	−6.5
Turnout		54,656	75.0	–6.5
Registered electors		72,852		+1,193
Conservative hold		Swing	–3.3	

1992 notional result
Party	Vote	%
Conservative	35,676	61.1
Liberal Democrats	15,704	26.9
Labour	6,135	10.5
Others	919	1.6
Turnout	58,434	81.5
Electorate	71,659	

General election 1992: East Surrey
Party	Candidate	Votes	%	±%
Conservative	Peter Ainsworth	29,767	62.3	−1.1
Liberal Democrats	Robert L. Tomlin	12,111	25.4	+1.5
Labour	Gill M. Roles	5,075	10.6	+0.2
Green	Ian T. Kilpatrick	819	1.7	−0.6
Majority		17,656	36.9	−2.6
Turnout		47,772	82.3	+5.1
Registered electors				
Conservative hold		Swing	−1.2	

=== Elections in the 1980s ===
General election 1987: East Surrey
Party	Candidate	Votes	%	±%
Conservative	Geoffrey Howe	29,126	63.4	+0.5
Liberal	Michael Anderson	11,000	23.9	−3.4
Labour	Michael Davis	4,779	10.4	+0.6
Green	David Newell	1,044	2.3	New
Majority		18,126	39.5	+3.9
Turnout		45,949	77.2	+3.1
Registered electors				
Conservative hold		Swing		

General election 1983: East Surrey
Party	Candidate	Votes	%	±%
Conservative	Geoffrey Howe	27,272	62.9	
Liberal	Susan Liddell	11,836	27.3	
Labour	Hugh Pincott	4,249	9.8	
Majority		15,436	35.6	
Turnout		43,357	74.1	
Registered electors				
Conservative hold		Swing		

=== Elections in the 1970s ===
General election 1979: East Surrey
Party	Candidate	Votes	%	±%
Conservative	Geoffrey Howe	28,266	62.84	
Liberal	Susan Liddell	8,866	19.71	
Labour	Graham Harries	7,398	16.45	
National Front	D. Smith	452	1.00	New
Majority		19,400	43.13	
Turnout		44,982	78.42	
Registered electors				
Conservative hold		Swing		

General election October 1974: East Surrey
Party	Candidate	Votes	%	±%
Conservative	Geoffrey Howe	22,227	52.41	
Liberal	Kenneth Vaus	12,382	29.20	
Labour	David Allonby	7,797	18.39	
Majority		9,845	23.21	
Turnout		42,406	76.17	
Registered electors				
Conservative hold		Swing		

General election February 1974: East Surrey
Party	Candidate	Votes	%	±%
Conservative	Geoffrey Howe	23,563	51.2	–8.6
Liberal	Kenneth Vaus	15,544	33.8	+15.2
Labour	David Allonby	6,946	15.1	–6.6
Majority		8,019	17.4	–20.6
Turnout		46,053	83.6	+10.7
Registered electors		55,099		–491
Conservative hold		Swing	–11.9	

1970 notional result
Party	Vote	%
Conservative	24,200	59.8
Labour	8,800	21.7
Liberal	7,500	18.5
Turnout	40,500	72.9
Electorate	55,590	

== Election results 1918–1974 ==
=== Elections in the 1970s ===
General election 1970: East Surrey
Party	Candidate	Votes	%	±%
Conservative	William Clark	35,773	61.99	
Liberal	Percy W. Meyer	11,749	20.36	
Labour	Michael D. Simmons	10,186	17.65	
Majority		24,024	41.63	
Turnout		57,708	73.08	
Registered electors				
Conservative hold		Swing		

=== Elections in the 1960s ===
General election 1966: East Surrey
Party	Candidate	Votes	%	±%
Conservative	Charles Doughty	30,900	54.54	
Liberal	Michael R Lane	16,407	28.96	
Labour	Cyril Shaw	9,347	16.50	
Majority		14,493	25.58	
Turnout		56,654	79.33	
Registered electors				
Conservative hold		Swing		

General election 1964: East Surrey
Party	Candidate	Votes	%	±%
Conservative	Charles Doughty	31,827	55.94	
Liberal	Michael R Lane	16,049	28.21	
Labour	James Stewart Cook	9,020	15.85	
Majority		15,778	27.73	
Turnout		56,896	79.22	
Registered electors				
Conservative hold		Swing		

=== Elections in the 1950s ===
General election 1959: East Surrey
Party	Candidate	Votes	%	±%
Conservative	Charles Doughty	36,310	63.94	
Liberal	Kenneth Vaus	10,376	18.27	New
Labour	James C Hunt	10,102	17.79	
Majority		25,934	45.67	
Turnout		56,788	81.13	
Registered electors				
Conservative hold		Swing		

General election 1955: East Surrey
Party	Candidate	Votes	%	±%
Conservative	Charles Doughty	37,276	74.79	
Labour	Jean Graham Hall	12,567	25.21	
Majority		24,709	49.58	
Turnout		49,843	76.47	
Registered electors				
Conservative hold		Swing		

General election 1951: East Surrey
Party	Candidate	Votes	%	±%
Conservative	Charles Doughty	37,966	72.98	
Labour	Nathan Whine	14,056	27.02	
Majority		23,910	45.96	
Turnout		52,052	81.30	
Registered electors				
Conservative hold		Swing		

General election 1950: East Surrey
Party	Candidate	Votes	%
Conservative	Michael Astor	32,711	60.92
Labour	Nathan Whine	12,499	23.28
Liberal	Wendy Wills	8,484	15.80
Majority		20,212	37.64
Turnout		53,694	87.17
Registered electors			
Conservative win (new boundaries)			

=== Election in the 1940s ===
General election 1945: Surrey Eastern
Party	Candidate	Votes	%	±%
Conservative	Michael Astor	31,117	53.36	
Labour	Henry Edward Weaver	17,708	30.36	
Liberal	Donald Phillip Owen	9,495	16.28	New
Majority		13,409	23.00	
Turnout		58,320	74.50	
Registered electors				
Conservative hold		Swing		

=== Elections in the 1930s ===
General Election 1939–40:

Another General Election was required to take place before the end of 1940. The political parties had been making preparations for an election to take place from 1939 and by the end of this year, the following candidates had been selected;

- Conservative: Charles Emmott
- Labour:

General election 1935: Surrey Eastern
Party	Candidate	Votes	%	±%
Conservative	Charles Emmott	33,776	78.91	
Labour	Henry Edward Weaver	9,025	21.09	
Majority		24,751	57.82	
Turnout		42,801	66.54	
Registered electors				
Conservative hold		Swing		

General election 1931: Surrey Eastern
Party	Candidate	Votes	%	±%
Conservative	James Galbraith	33,771	88.85	
Labour	Mont Follick	4,236	11.15	
Majority		29,535	77.70	
Turnout		38,007	71.40	
Conservative hold		Swing		

=== Elections in the 1920s ===
General election 1929: Surrey East
Party	Candidate	Votes	%	±%
Unionist	James Galbraith	19,578	60.9	−22.2
Liberal	Ida Swinburne	7,435	23.1	New
Labour	Robert Oscar Mennell	5,152	16.0	−0.9
Majority		12,143	37.8	−28.4
Turnout		32,345		
Unionist hold		Swing		

General election 1924: East Surrey
Party	Candidate	Votes	%	±%
Unionist	James Galbraith	15,999	83.1	N/A
Labour	Robert Oscar Mennell	3,249	16.9	New
Majority		12,750	66.2	N/A
Turnout		19,248	70.7	N/A
Registered electors				
Unionist hold		Swing	N/A	

General election 1923: Surrey East
Party	Candidate	Votes	%	±%
Unionist	James Galbraith	Unopposed		
Unionist hold				

General election 1922: East Surrey
Party	Candidate	Votes	%	±%
Unionist	James Galbraith	12,498	77.3	−5.5
Labour	Marjorie Pease	3,667	22.7	New
Majority		8,831	54.6	−11.0
Turnout		16,165	64.5	+17.4
Registered electors				
Unionist hold		Swing		

=== Elections in the 1910s ===
General election 1918: East Surrey
Party		Candidate	Votes	%
C	Unionist	Stuart Coats	8,795	82.8
	Liberal	Guy Hayler	1,830	17.2
Majority			6,965	65.6
Turnout			10,625	47.1
Registered electors				
	Unionist win (new seat)			
C indicates candidate endorsed by the coalition government.

== Election results 1832–1885 ==
=== Elections in the 1880s ===
General election 1880: East Surrey (2 seats)
Party	Candidate	Votes	%	±%
Conservative	William Grantham	8,104	28.9	+0.4
Conservative	James Watney	8,006	28.6	−0.4
Liberal	William F Robinson	5,978	21.3	−0.6
Liberal	George Webb Medley	5,928	21.2	+0.7
Majority		2,028	7.3	+0.7
Turnout		14,008 (est)	73.8 (est)	+6.2
Registered electors		18,969		
Conservative hold		Swing	+0.5	
Conservative hold		Swing	−0.6	

=== Elections in the 1870s ===
General election 1874: East Surrey (2 seats)
Party	Candidate	Votes	%	±%
Conservative	James Watney	5,673	29.0	+5.6
Conservative	William Grantham	5,579	28.5	+5.6
Liberal	Peter King	4,292	21.9	−5.7
Liberal	John Peter Gassiot	4,015	20.5	−5.6
Majority		1,658	8.5	N/A
Majority		1,287	6.6	N/A
Turnout		9,780 (est)	67.6 (est)	−1.5
Registered electors		14,468		
Conservative gain from Liberal		Swing	+5.6	
Conservative gain from Liberal		Swing	+5.6	

By-election, 26 August 1871: East Surrey (1 seat)
Party	Candidate	Votes	%	±%
Conservative	James Watney	3,912	58.7	+12.4
Liberal	Granville Leveson-Gower	2,749	41.3	−12.4
Majority		1,163	17.4	N/A
Turnout		6,661	51.4	−17.7
Registered electors		12,960		
Conservative gain from Liberal		Swing	+12.4	

- Caused by Buxton's death.

=== Elections in the 1860s ===
General election 1868: East Surrey (2 seats)
Party	Candidate	Votes	%	±%
Liberal	Peter King	4,162	27.6	+1.7
Liberal	Charles Buxton	3,941	26.1	+0.7
Conservative	William Hardman	3,537	23.4	−1.3
Conservative	James Lord	3,459	22.9	−1.0
Majority		404	2.7	+2.0
Turnout		7,550 (est)	69.1 (est)	+1.1
Registered electors		10,932		
Liberal hold		Swing	+1.4	
Liberal hold		Swing	+0.9	

General election 1865: East Surrey (2 seats)
Party	Candidate	Votes	%	±%
Liberal	Peter King	3,495	25.9	−11.0
Liberal	Charles Buxton	3,424	25.4	−11.8
Conservative	Henry Peek	3,333	24.7	+11.7
Conservative	William Brodrick	3,226	23.9	+10.9
Majority		91	0.7	−10.3
Turnout		6,739 (est)	68.0 (est)	+0.1
Registered electors		9,913		
Liberal hold		Swing	−11.2	
Liberal hold		Swing	−11.6	

=== Elections in the 1850s ===
General election 1859: East Surrey (2 seats)
Party	Candidate	Votes	%	±%
Liberal	Thomas Alcock	2,953	37.2	N/A
Liberal	Peter King	2,926	36.9	N/A
Conservative	Anthony Cleasby	2,050	25.9	New
Majority		876	11.0	N/A
Turnout		4,990 (est)	67.9 (est)	N/A
Registered electors		7,350		
Liberal hold		Swing	N/A	
Liberal hold		Swing	N/A	

General election 1857: East Surrey (2 seats)
Party	Candidate	Votes	%	±%
Whig	Thomas Alcock	Unopposed		
Whig	Peter King	Unopposed		
Registered electors		7,191		
Whig hold				
Whig hold				

General election 1852: East Surrey (2 seats)
Party	Candidate	Votes	%	±%
Whig	Thomas Alcock	2,508	27.9	N/A
Whig	Peter King	2,500	27.8	N/A
Conservative	Edmund Antrobus	2,064	22.9	New
Conservative	Anthony Cleasby	1,928	21.4	New
Majority		436	4.9	N/A
Turnout		4,500 (est)	68.0 (est)	N/A
Registered electors		6,618		
Whig hold		Swing	N/A	
Whig hold		Swing	N/A	

=== Elections in the 1840s ===
General election 1847: East Surrey (2 seats)
Party	Candidate	Votes	%	±%
Whig	Thomas Alcock	Unopposed		
Whig	Peter King	Unopposed		
Registered electors		6,028		
Whig gain from Conservative				
Whig gain from Conservative				

General election 1841: East Surrey (2 seats)
Party	Candidate	Votes	%	±%
Conservative	Edmund Antrobus	Unopposed		
Conservative	Henry Kemble	Unopposed		
Registered electors		6,222		
Conservative hold				
Conservative hold				

By-election, 8 February 1841: East Surrey
Party	Candidate	Votes	%	±%
Conservative	Edmund Antrobus	2,635	64.7	+10.7
Whig	Thomas Alcock	1,436	35.3	−10.7
Majority		1,199	29.4	+25.8
Turnout		4,071	65.4	−5.8
Registered electors		6,222		
Conservative hold		Swing	+10.7	

- Caused by Alsager's death.

=== Elections in the 1830s ===
General election 1837: East Surrey (2 seats)
Party	Candidate	Votes	%	±%
Conservative	Richard Alsager	2,176	27.1	+7.9
Conservative	Henry Kemble	2,155	26.9	+7.7
Whig	Peter King	1,865	23.3	+8.7
Whig	John Angerstein	1,823	22.7	+8.1
Majority		290	3.6	−5.6
Turnout		3,937	71.2	−6.6
Registered electors		5,531		
Conservative hold		Swing	−0.3	
Conservative gain from Radical		Swing	−0.4	

General election 1835: East Surrey (2 seats)
Party	Candidate	Votes	%	±%
Conservative	Richard Alsager	1,578	38.5	+17.0
Radical	Aubrey Beauclerk	1,324	32.3	+2.5
Whig	John Ivatt Briscoe	1,200	29.3	−19.4
Turnout		2,753	77.8	+7.6
Registered electors		3,537		
Majority		378	9.2	N/A
Conservative gain from Whig		Swing	+13.4	
Majority		124	3.0	−5.3
Radical hold		Swing	+6.1	

General election 1832: East Surrey (2 seats)
Party	Candidate	Votes	%
Whig	John Ivatt Briscoe	1,643	42.4
Radical	Aubrey Beauclerk	1,155	29.8
Tory	Thomas Jeffreys Allen	835	21.5
Whig	John Lainson	244	6.3
Turnout		2,211	70.2
Registered electors		3,150	
Majority		488	12.6
Whig win (new seat)			
Majority		320	8.3
Radical win (new seat)			

== See also ==
- 2005 United Kingdom general election result in Surrey
- List of parliamentary constituencies in Surrey
- List of parliamentary constituencies in the South East England (region)

== Sources ==
- Election result, 2010 BBC News
- Election result, 2005 BBC News
- Election results, 1997 – 2001 BBC News
- Election results, 1997 – 2001 Election Demon
- Election results, 1983 – 1992 Election Demon
- Election results, 1992 – 2010 The Guardian
- Election results, 1945 – 1979 Politics Resources

Parliament of the United Kingdom
Preceded by Leeds East	Constituency represented by the chancellor of the Exchequer; 1979–1983	Succeeded by Blaby
