= John Antrobus (cricketer) =

English cricketer and clergyman

Personal information
- Full name: John Antrobus
- Born: 1806; Middlesex, England
- Died: 26 July 1878 (aged 71–72); London, England

Domestic team information
- Years: Team
- 1826: Cambridge University
- First-class debut: 17 May 1826 Cambridge University v Cambridge Town
- Last First-class: Lord Strathavon's XI v Sir St Vincent Cotton's XI

Career statistics
Competition	FC
Matches	2
Runs scored	17
Batting average	5.66
100s/50s	0/0
Top score	11
Catches/stumpings	1/–
- Source: CricketArchive, 11 October 2008

John Antrobus (1806 – 26 July 1878) was an English clergyman and cricketer who played for Cambridge University in 1826.

Antrobus was born in Acton, the son of Rev. William Antrobus, rector of Acton. He was educated at Eton where he played twice in the Eton-Harrow match, and then went to St John's College, Cambridge. He was also renowned as the 'Champion Skater' of his day.

Antrobus made two first-class appearances, separated by six years. His first match, in 1826, was for Cambridge University against Cambridge Town Club. Batting as an opener, Antrobus had an indifferent debut match, scoring six runs in the first innings as batting partner Charles Chapman scored 47 not out, carrying his bat throughout the order, as only one more batsman made a double-figures total.

Antrobus' second and final first-class fixture came in 1832 in a match for Lord Strathavon's XI against Sir St Vincent Cotton's XI, in which he scored a duck in the first innings and was absent hurt in the second.

Antrobus was ordained deacon (London) on 25 May 1834 and priest on 14 June 1835. He was curate to his father at St Andrew Undershaft, London, from 1841 to 1853. He was a Minor Canon of Westminster from 1856 to 1878 and Chaplain-in-Ordinary to the Queen from 1869 to 1878.

Antrobus died in Westminster aged 72.

== Publications ==
- Parental Wisdom
- The Wrongs of Poland – a Poem in three Cantos
- The Czar and the Turk
- Elijah in the Desert
