= Amesbury Abbey (house) =

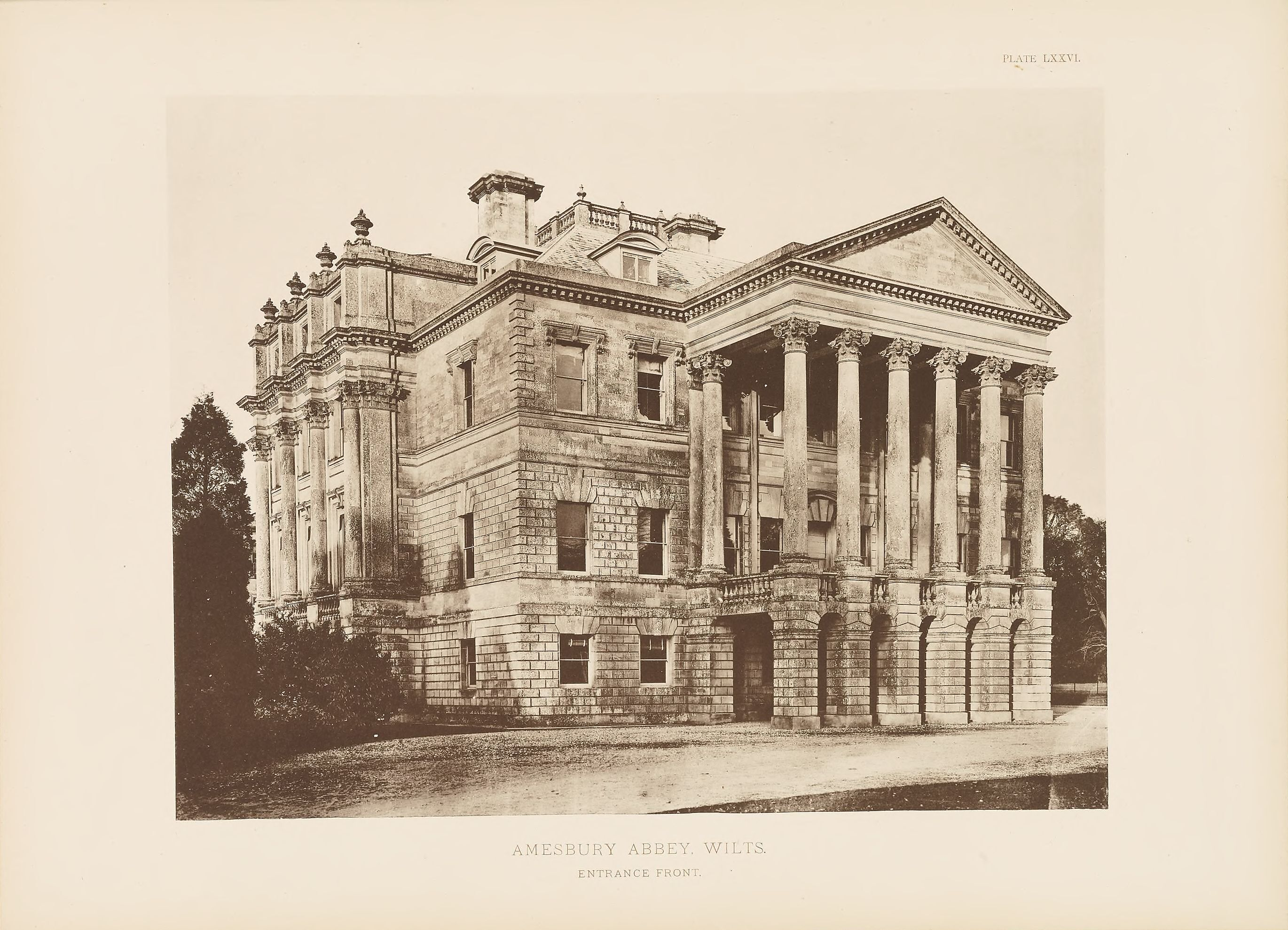
- Amesbury Abbey, 1890s

- Location within Wiltshire
- 51.1745°N 1.7854°W
- Location: Amesbury, England
- OS grid reference: SU15104172

History
- Built: 1840, 1859

Site notes
- Architect: Thomas Hopper
- Architectural style: Palladian
- Current use: Care home

Listed Building – Grade I
- Official name: Amesbury Abbey
- Designated: 10 January 1953
- Reference no.: 1131079

Amesbury Abbey is a Grade I listed mansion in Amesbury, Wiltshire, England, built in the 1830s for Sir Edmund Antrobus to designs of Thomas Hopper. The house, which stands in Grade II* listed parkland, is now used as a care home. It takes its name from Amesbury Abbey, founded in about 979 on or near the same site.

== Predecessors ==
A Benedictine nunnery known as Amesbury Abbey was founded by Ælfthryth (wife of Edgar) in about the year 979 on a site near the River Avon. Henry II replaced it in 1177 with a house of the Order of Fontevraud, known as Amesbury Priory, which continued until the Dissolution in 1539.

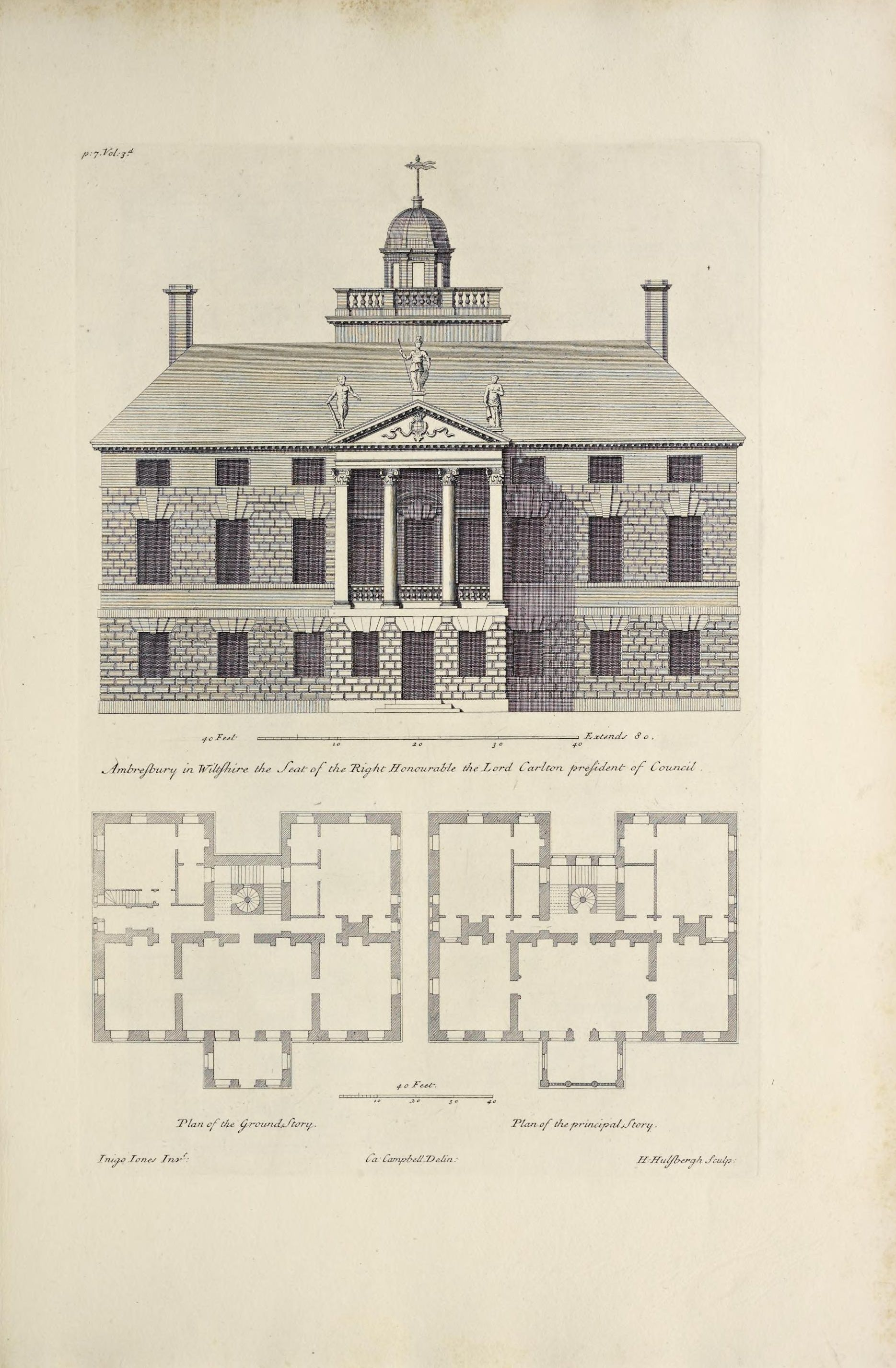
The 1661 house, from the 1725 volume of Vitruvius Britannicus; attributed there to Inigo Jones, now credited to John Webb

The priory and its extensive landholdings were granted to Edward Seymour, Earl of Hertford (later Duke of Somerset). Some of the priory buildings were destroyed, while others were probably reused to form a house for the Seymours.

This house was rebuilt in 1660–1661 to designs of John Webb, for William Seymour (1588–1660) and his successor, a grandson, also William. In 1720 it was bought by Lord Carleton, and was included in Colen Campbell's 1725 Vitruvius Britannicus, a collection of engravings of the great houses of the time.

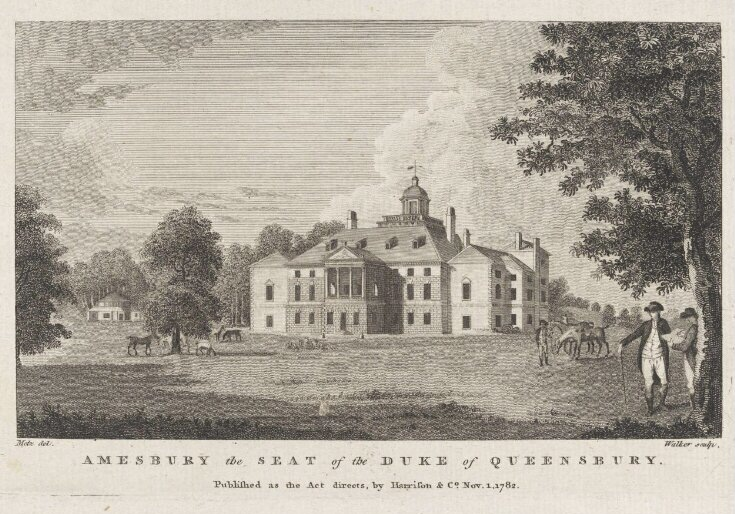
The house in 1782, as enlarged by Queensberry

Harrison's 1786 Picturesque Views of the Principal Seats of the Nobility and Gentry shows single-bay wings added by the Duke of Queensberry, perhaps designed by Henry Flitcroft. It has been described as "the perfect example of the 'temple front' house, formed by adding a pedimented temple portico to a domestic block". From the mid-18th century the house became known as Amesbury Abbey.

== Description ==
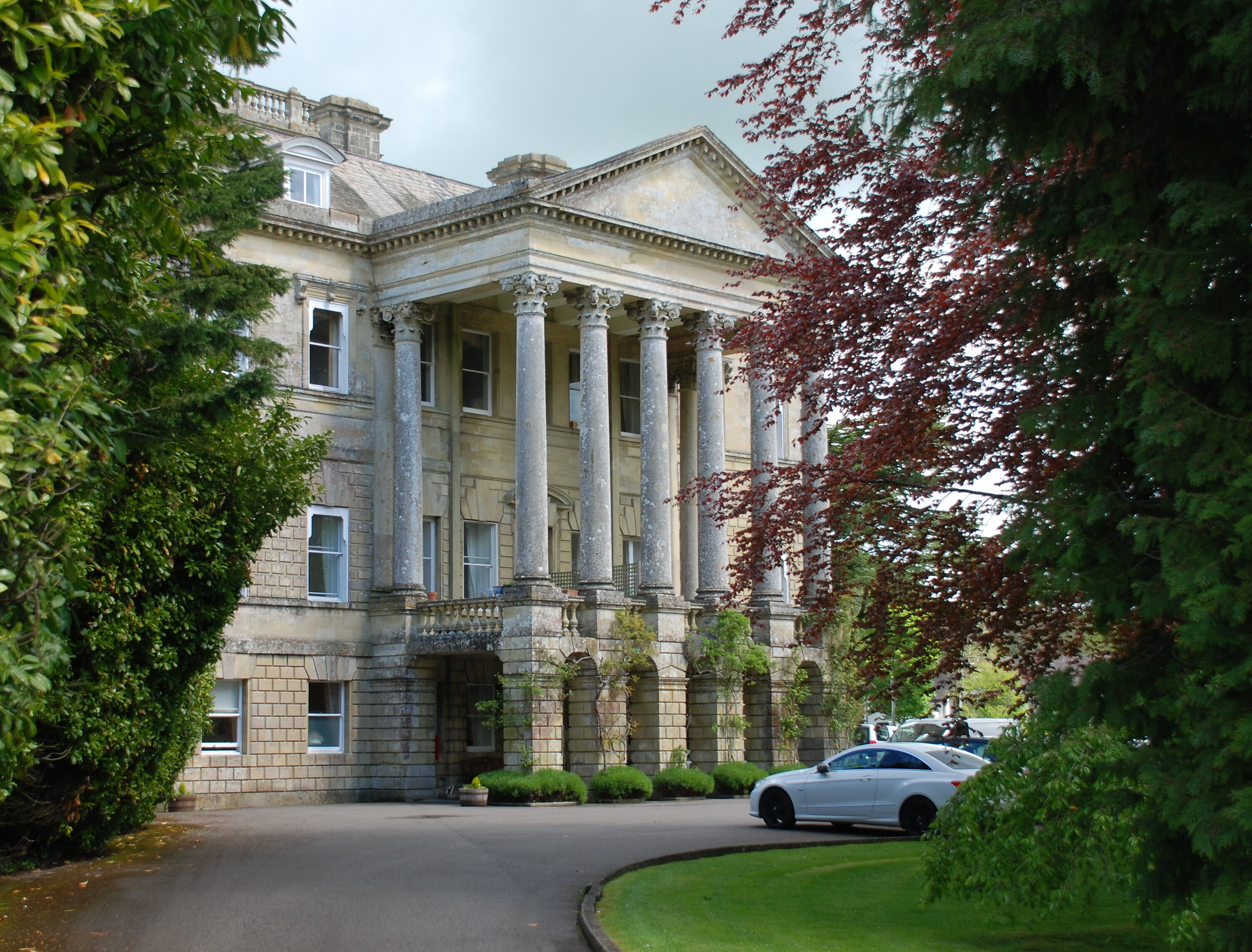
South front

The present house was built in 1834–1840 by architect Thomas Hopper for Sir Edmund Antrobus, who had bought the property in 1825. It is constructed on the same foundations as the 1661 house, in a cubic form of Chilmark limestone ashlar with slate roofs. It has three storeys and attics, and is described by Historic England as "a grander reinterpretation of its predecessor". The main south front has nine bays, of which five sit behind a portico of six composite columns. The main entrance was originally on a piano nobile behind the colonnade.

The building was extended and much altered in 1857–1859 after an 1855 fire, with Hopper again the architect. John Belcher criticised the outcome in his 1901 book, particularly the use of rustication on both lower floors, the lack of connection between the portico and the rest of the building, and the use of single sheets of glass in the windows. He notes that the original design was crowned by a central cupola.

== 20th and 21st centuries ==
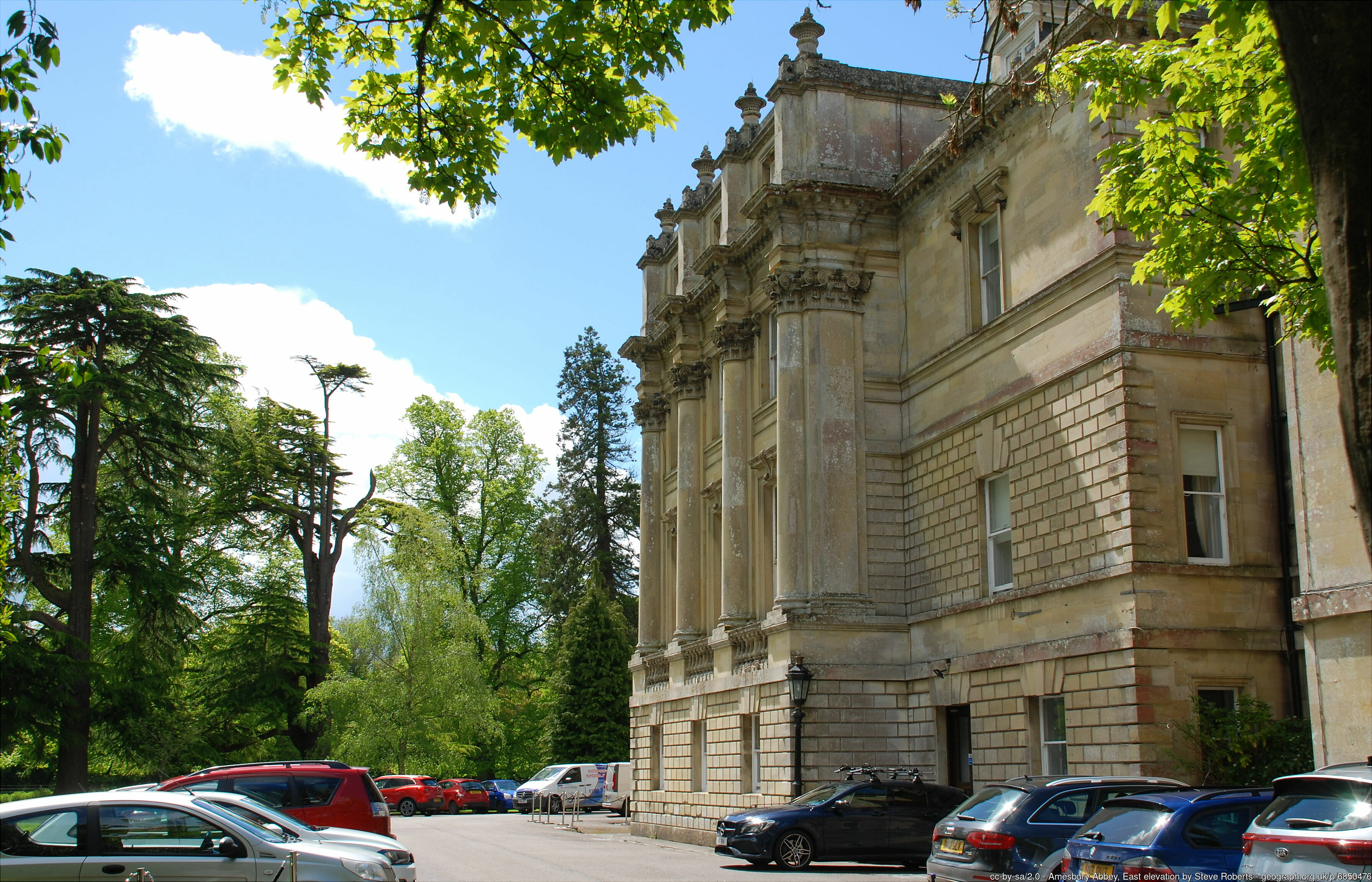
East elevation

The architect Detmar Blow made further improvements in 1904. The Antrobus family sold most of the estate's land (including Stonehenge), in several lots in 1915.

From June 1940, the house was used by Major General Henry Wynter as the administrative headquarters of the Second Australian Imperial Force, which was at first trained to defend Southern England against an expected German invasion. They departed for Colchester and then the Middle East in October of that year.

The house was designated as Grade I listed in 1953 and was converted into flats around 1960. It remained in Antrobus ownership until 1979.

The house, now in 35 acres of parkland, is operated as a care home and nursing home. Amesbury Abbey Group has also built houses and apartments near the mansion.

== Grounds and lodges ==
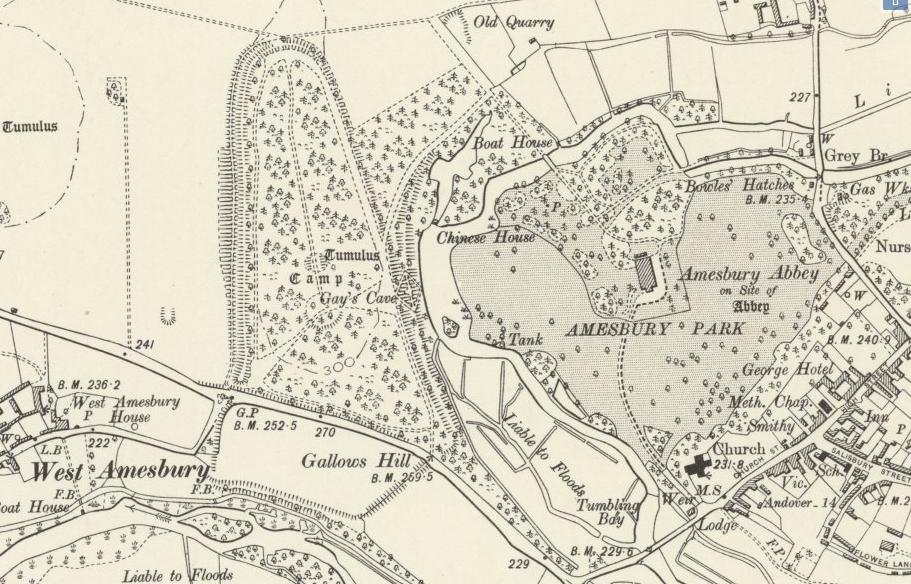
House and park on a 1901 map

The mansion stands in pleasure grounds and parkland, in all about 140 acres (56 ha), which in 1987 were listed Grade II* on the Register of Historic Parks and Gardens of special historic interest. Three features are themselves Grade II* listed: the ornamental bridge (1775) and Chinese temple (1772), both by Sir William Chambers; and Guy's Cave, a late-18th-century grotto set under the east side of the hill known as Vespasian's Camp.

Two flint and stone gatehouses east of the mansion – Kent House and Diana's House – are from the early 17th century and are Grade II* listed.

New entrance gates were erected near Kent House in the 1720s, and a formal ride leading to this eastern entrance was planted for Lord Carleton. Later called Lord's Walk, the half-mile strip along the riverbank had been opened to the public by 1915. It was sold to Amesbury Parish Council in two tranches, in 1950 and 1978, and today is a public amenity.

After 1735, the Duke of Queensberry acquired land west of the river which included the Iron Age hillfort called Vespasian's Camp. Plans for a formal landscape were drawn up by the notable garden designer Charles Bridgeman shortly before his death in 1738, and Andrews' and Dury's 1773 map shows the park and hill laid out with formal rides and avenues. By the early 19th century a new southern entrance to the park had been created, next to the parish church, using gate pillars each with a pair of Tuscan columns below a triangular pediment.

The park was extended to the north and west, and clumps of trees known as the Nile Clumps were planted there to commemorate Nelson's victory at the 1798 Battle of the Nile, in a layout probably intended to mimic the positions of British and French ships. This part of the estate (now separated from the house by the A303) was later sold off.

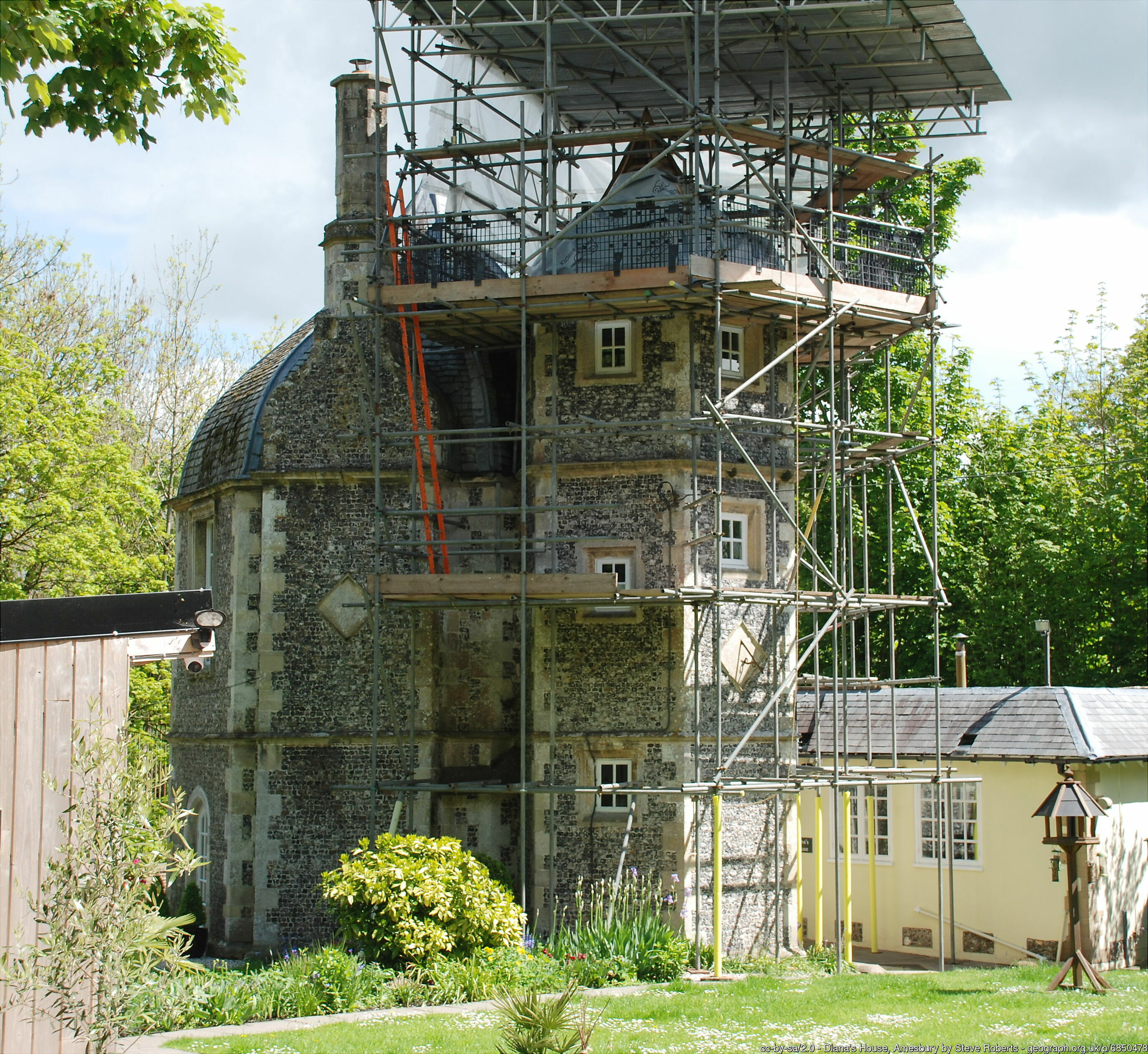
Diana's House
