= Antrobus baronets =

Baronetcy in the Baronetage of the United Kingdom

- Escutcheon of the Antrobus baronets of Antrobus
- Creation date: 1815
- Created by: George III
- Peerage: Peerage of the United Kingdom
- Status: extant
- Seat: Antrobus Hall
- Motto: Dei memor gratus amicus, Mindful of God, grateful to friends

The Antrobus Baronetcy, of Antrobus in the County Palatine of Chester, is a title in the Baronetage of the United Kingdom.

It was created on 22 May 1815 for Edmund Antrobus, of Antrobus Hall, Antrobus, Cheshire, a Fellow of the Royal Society, with remainder to his nephews Edmund Antrobus and Gibbs Antrobus. He died unmarried in 1826 and was succeeded according to the special remainder by his nephew Edmund, the second Baronet. He and his brother Gibbs were the sons of John Antrobus, brother of the first Baronet. The second Baronet was succeeded by his eldest son, the third Baronet. He sat as Member of Parliament for Surrey East and Wilton. His eldest son, the fourth Baronet, was a Colonel in the Coldstream Guards. He died in 1915 without surviving male issue and was succeeded by his younger brother, the fifth Baronet. Most of the Amesbury Abbey estate in Wiltshire was sold the same year.

The fifth Baronet died unmarried and was succeeded by his first cousin, the sixth Baronet. He was the son of Robert Crawfurd Antrobus, younger son of the second Baronet. He was childless and on his death in 1968 the line of the second Baronet failed. He was succeeded by his second cousin once removed, the seventh Baronet. He was the eldest son of Edward Geoffrey Antrobus, second son of John Coutts Antrobus, son of the aforementioned Gibbs Antrobus, younger brother of the second Baronet. As of 2008 the title is held by the seventh Baronet's eldest son, the eighth Baronet, who succeeded in 1995. He lives in Johannesburg, South Africa.

The second and third Baronets were High Sheriff of Wiltshire in 1832 and 1880 respectively. The aforementioned Gibbs Antrobus, younger brother of the second Baronet, represented Aldborough in the House of Commons. Ronald Henry Antrobus (1891–1980), youngest son of the aforementioned John Coutts Antrobus, was High Sheriff of Cheshire in 1960 and a Deputy Lieutenant of the county.

== Antrobus baronets, of Antrobus (1815) ==
- Sir Edmund Antrobus, 1st Baronet (died 1826)
- Sir Edmund Antrobus, 2nd Baronet (1792–1870)
- Sir Edmund Antrobus, 3rd Baronet (1818–1899)
- Sir Edmund Antrobus, 4th Baronet (1848–1915)
- Sir Cosmo Gordon Antrobus, 5th Baronet (1859–1939)
- Sir Philip Humphrey Antrobus, 6th Baronet (1876–1968)
- Sir Philip Coutts Antrobus, 7th Baronet (1908–1995)
- Sir Edward Philip Antrobus, 8th Baronet (born 1938)

The heir apparent to the baronetcy is Francis Edward Sceales Antrobus (born 1972), only son of the 8th Baronet.

Baronetage of the United Kingdom
Preceded by Silvester baronets	Antrobus baronets of Antrobus; 22 May 1815	Succeeded by Campbell baronets
