= Richard Alsager =

British politician and businessman

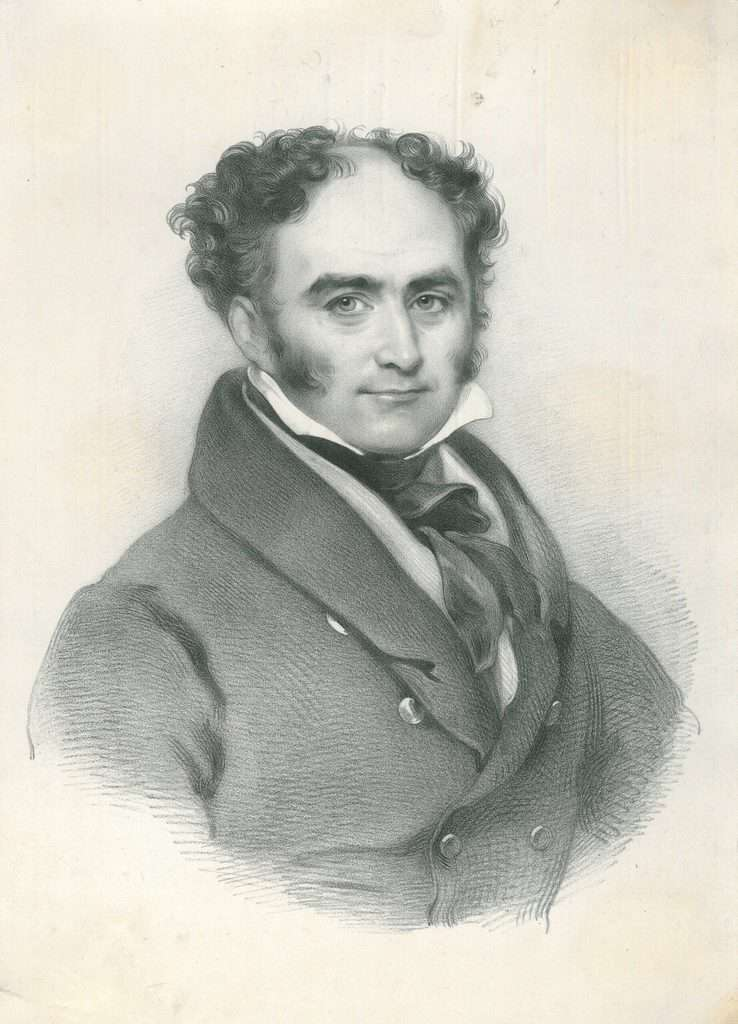
- Born: 11 October 1781
- Died: 17 January 1841 (aged 59)

Captain Richard Alsager (died 17 January 1841) was a British politician and businessman who served as the Conservative MP for East Surrey from 1835 to 1841.

While in Parliament, Alsager made 15 contributions in the Hansard, spanning 1835 to 1839 only. He lived in Upper Tooting, then a director of Globe Insurance. He was also a director of the Imperial Gas Light and Coke Company.

Alsager died at Upper Tooting in January 1841. His will passed less than the headline bracket of £30,000, its executor was Elizabeth Beatrice, his widow.
