= Château de Montsoreau =

Castle in Loire Valley, France

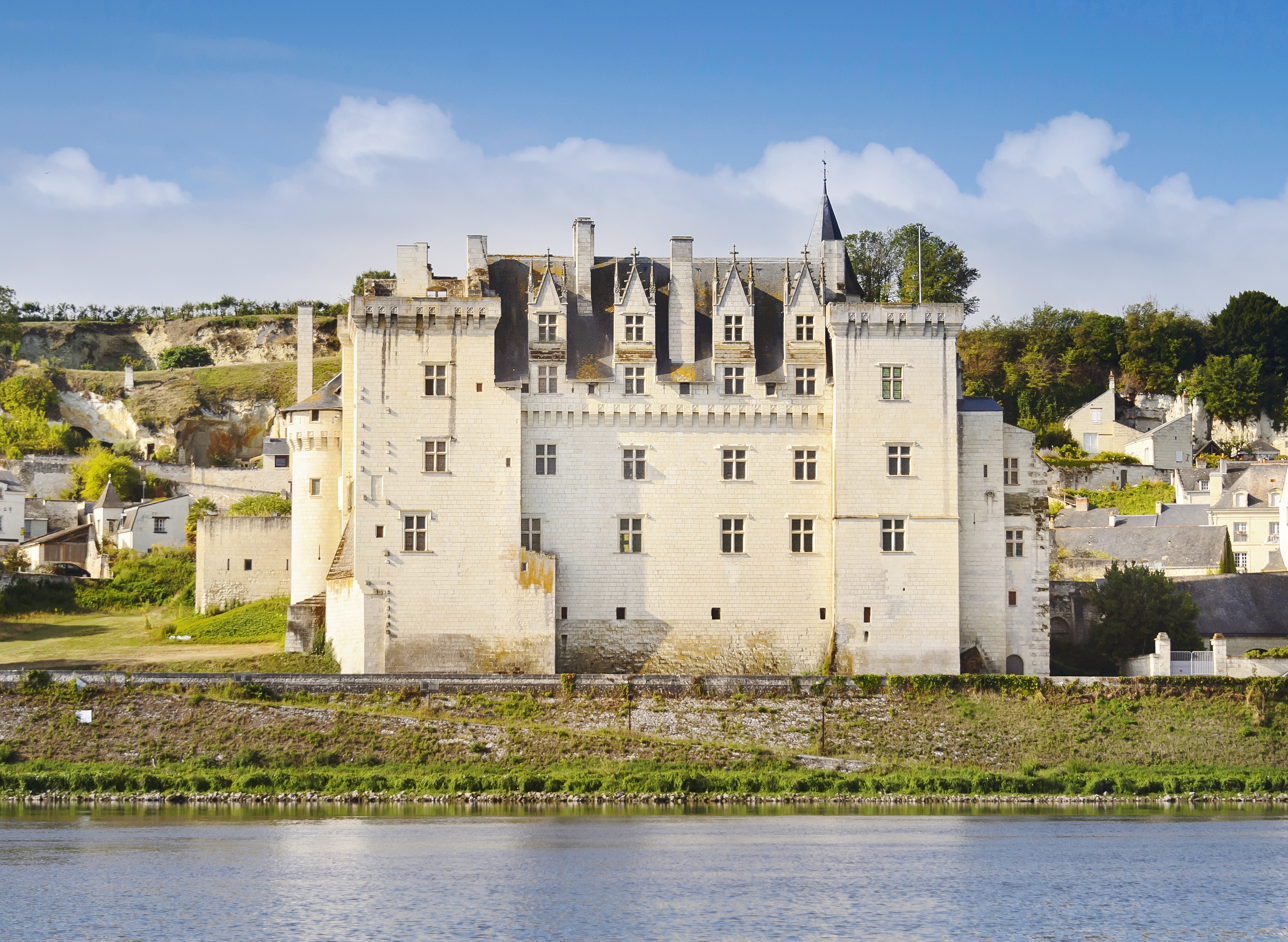
- Château de Montsoreau, Loire Valley.

- Location within France

General information
- Architectural style: Flamboyant Gothic, French Renaissance
- Location: Montsoreau; Maine-et-Loire; France, Château de Montsoreau; 49730 Montsoreau; France
- Coordinates: 47°12′56″N 0°03′44″E
- Current tenants: Philippe Méaille
- Construction started: 1443
- Completed: 1515

Height
- Height: 45 m (148 ft)

Website
- Official website

UNESCO World Heritage Site
- Official name: The Loire Valley between Sully-sur-Loire and Chalonnes, previously inscribed as Chateau and Estate of Chambord
- Type: Cultural
- Criteria: i, ii, vi
- Designated: 2000 (24th session)
- Reference no.: 933
- Region: Europe

The Château de Montsoreau is a Flamboyant Gothic castle in the Loire Valley, directly built in the Loire riverbed. It is located in the market town of Montsoreau, in the Maine-et-Loire département of France, close to Saumur, Chinon, Fontevraud-l'Abbaye, and Candes-Saint-Martin. The Château de Montsoreau is situated at the confluence of two rivers, the Loire and the Vienne, and the meeting point of three historical regions: Anjou, Poitou, and Touraine.

A Gallo-Roman origin has been verified for the settlement of Montsoreau but not confirmed for the castle, even though a fluted column made of stone from a Gallo-Roman temple or a public building was found in the moat during the restoration works of the end of the 20th century. The first written sources are from the 6th century with the domain of Restis, but it was only with the construction of a fortress at the end of the 10th century that the market town began to become prosperous. One part of this first castle was found during the same restoration works by the archaeologists. The castle was reconstructed in a Flamboyant Gothic style between 1450 and 1460 by Jean de Chambes, one of the kingdom's wealthiest men, a senior councillor and chamberlain to King Charles VII and King Louis XI.

The Château de Montsoreau was written about by Alexandre Dumas in his novel La Dame de Monsoreau (1845–1846). This novel is the second part of a trilogy on the Renaissance between La Reine Margot and The Forty-Five Guardsmen.

Parts of the Château de Montsoreau were listed as a monument historique by the French Ministry of Culture in 1862, 1930, and 1938. The Loire Valley between Sully-sur-Loire and Chalonnes has been inscribed as a UNESCO World Heritage Site since 30 November 2000.

In 2015, the French contemporary art collector Philippe Méaille signed with Christian Gillet, president of the French department of the Maine-et-Loire an emphyteutic lease of 25 years of the real property of the Château de Montsoreau. The Château houses Méaille's collection of the conceptual art collective Art & Language as a museum named Château de Montsoreau-Museum of Contemporary Art.

== Etymology ==
=== Latin ===
The name Montsoreau first appeared in 1086 on a Latin map as Castrum Monte Sorello or Mons Sorello. Mons or Monte refers to a rocky promontory. The origin and interpretation of the name Sorello remain unknown but may mean bald or red. Before the fortress was built, an administrative or cult building had already occupied the site since Gallo-Roman times.

=== Literary ===
In La Dame de Monsoreau, Alexandre Dumas alludes to the origin of the name of the castle:

Ah! My goodness, my lord the Duke of Anjou will wait. This man makes me curious. I suspect he is very special. I don't know why we have these ideas, you know, the first time we meet people I don't know why I think I'll have trouble leaving with him, and then this name, Monsoreau! – Mount of the mouse, Antraguet continued, this is the etymology: my old abbot learned me this morning: Mons Soricis.

— Alexandre Dumas, La Dame de Monsoreau (1846)

== History ==
=== Middle Ages ===
The first written source describing the site under the name Restis dates back to the 6th century. It was transformed into a fortified castle by Eudes, the First count of Blois, in 990. In 1001, it was taken by the Anjou realm, and Foulques Nerra gave it to Gautier I of Montsoreau. Gautier I belonged to one of the most pre-eminent families of Anjou. Thus, the Castrum Monsorelli became one of the forty fortified castles in Anjou and one of the few to be given the title of lordship at the turn of the year 1000. A town developed quickly near the castle, and in the narratio de commendatione Turonice provincie, edited by Salmon in 1854, the site was mentioned as one of oppidis munitissimi et populosis by the second half of the 11th century Written sources from the 12th century attested to a right to raise taxes.

When the order of Fontevraud was settled in 1101, Fontevraud Abbey was supervised by Gautier de Montsoreau, who took direct orders from the Count of Anjou. Gautier's stepmother, Hersende de Champagne, was the first abbess and co-founder of the Abbey with Robert d'Arbrissel.

Guillaume IV de Montsoreau was on Geoffrey Plantagenet's side against his brother Henri Plantagenet, the future King Henry II of England and Eleanor of Aquitaine's husband. The latter besieged the castrum and took it at the end of August 1152, despite its fortification. He captured Guillaume and his defenders. Guillaume IV, however, was restored to the castle later. An order of Henry II (about 1168) concerning the landscape project of the Loire was signed by Guillaume de Montsoreau and his son Guillaume. In 1171, Guillaume's son gave the Turpenay monks the right to build tax-free houses inside the castrum. Gauthier, his eldest son, had no sons and so the lordship passed to the Savary de Montbazon family, on the marriage of his daughter Ferrie in 1213 to Pierre II Savary de Montbazon, lord of Montbazon.

After his victory at Bouvines, Philippe-Auguste chose him in 1214, with Guy Turpin, archdeacon of Tours, to negotiate peace with King John. The second house of Montsoreau disappeared in 1362, with the wedding of the only daughter of Renaud VII and Guillaume II de Craon. The fourth house, one of the Chabot family, lasted only a few decades.

In 1450, to pay off debts, Louis II Chabot sold his domains of Montsoreau and Coutancière to his brother-in-law Jean II de Chambes, who undertook to rebuild the castle at Montsoreau. A descendant of Angoumois old noble family (near the city of Angoulême), Jean II de Chambes began in Charles VII service as an esquire in 1426, the years before the interview between the King and Jeanne d'Arc in the Castle of Chinon. Baker in chief, Councillor and Chamberlain, he became in 1444 "first master of ostel" of the King; at the same time he associated with Jacques Coeur. Jean II de Chambes received a considerable amount of money that was owed to him. He performed diplomatic missions as an ambassador to Venice in 1459 to prepare a new crusade. His lordships of Montsoreau and Argenton, but also his governorship of La Rochelle and Lord Provost and Captain of Niort, Talmont-sur-Gironde and Aigues-Mortes assured him revenues.

=== Modern times ===
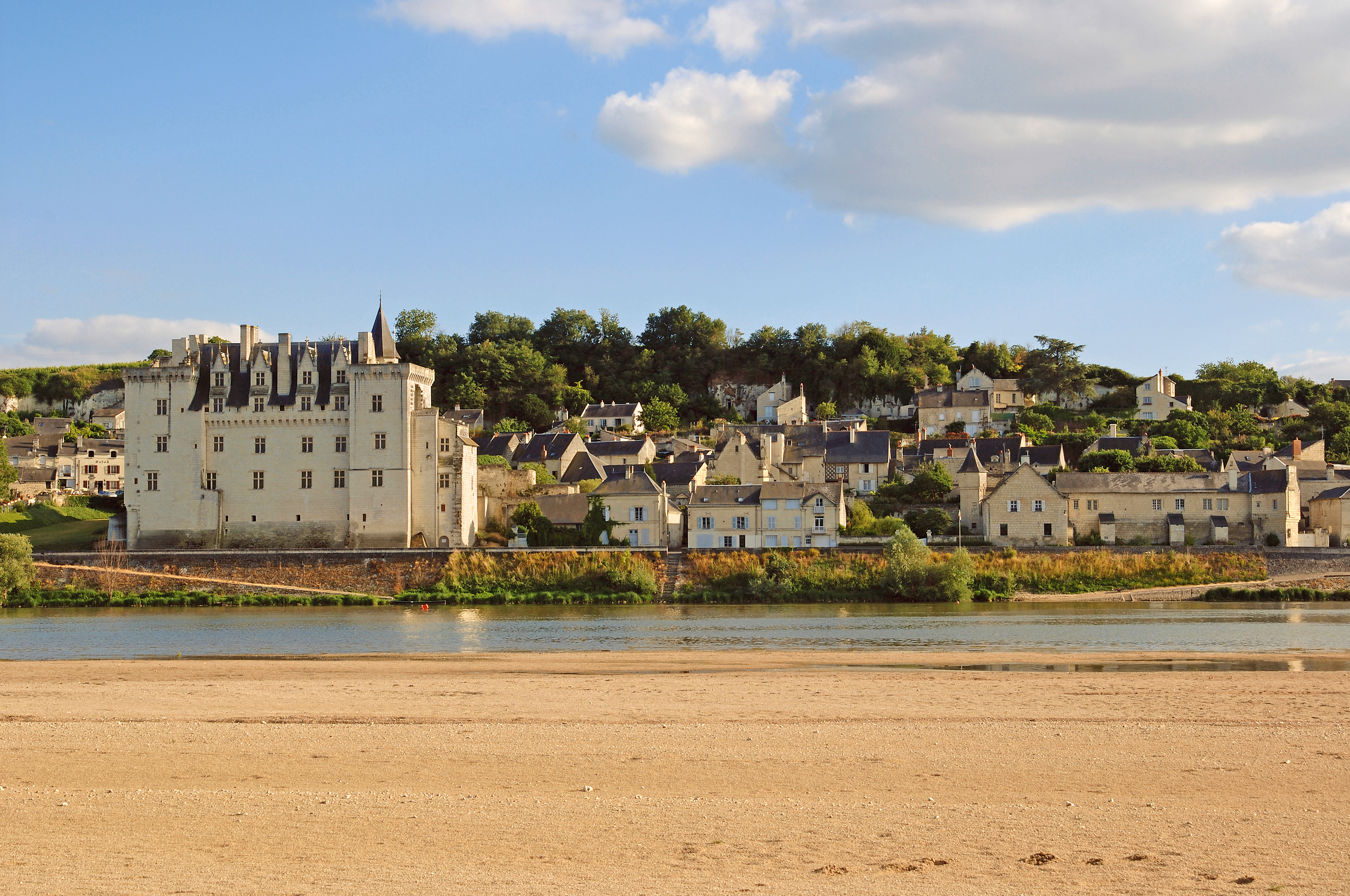
The Château de Montsoreau along the Loire river

From 1450 to 1460, Jean II de Chambes played a role as ambassador, and was called out of Anjou, while the castle was being built. His political and financial influence rose during these years including his closeness to Charles VII. Closer to Charles VII than Louis XI, Jean II de Chambes gradually withdrew from politics from 1461.

Jean III de Chambes succeeded his father, who died in 1473 and married Marie de Chateaubriant, who founded in 1519 the Holy Cross Collegiate Church across the moat surrounding the castle. In 1530, Philippe de Chambes, who lived in Montsoreau, married Anne de Laval-Montmorency. His eldest son, Jean VI de Chambes inherited the field of Coutancière and saw his lands made up into a barony in 1560.

Montsoreau was sacked by the Protestants in 1568. The Holy Cross Collegiate and the fortifications of the city were destroyed. Four years later, Jean VI de Chambes acquitted himself in the organisation of the "Saint Bartholomew Angevine" in Saumur and Angers. His Barony was confirmed by Letters Patent in 1573 and 1575.

After his death in 1575, his brother Charles de Chambes became Count of Montsoreau and the following year he married Françoise de Maridor, whose name was attached to the murder of Louis de Bussy d'Amboise.

Garrisons of seventy warriors lived in the castle in the course of the last decade of the 16th century. This ceased to exist during the reign of Louis XIII, and René de Chambes sought a garrison of royal troops but was refused by Richelieu. As a counterfeiter, he was sentenced to death and had to flee to England and was never able to return. After the death of his successor Bernard de Chambes, the castle of Montsoreau was rarely occupied by its various owners. The eldest daughter of Bernard de Chambes married Louis Francis Bouchet, who died in 1716, leaving 400,000 livres of debts. His eldest son Louis I de Bouchet, married Jeanne Pocholle Hamel who brought a 200,000 livres dowry.

=== Contemporary period ===
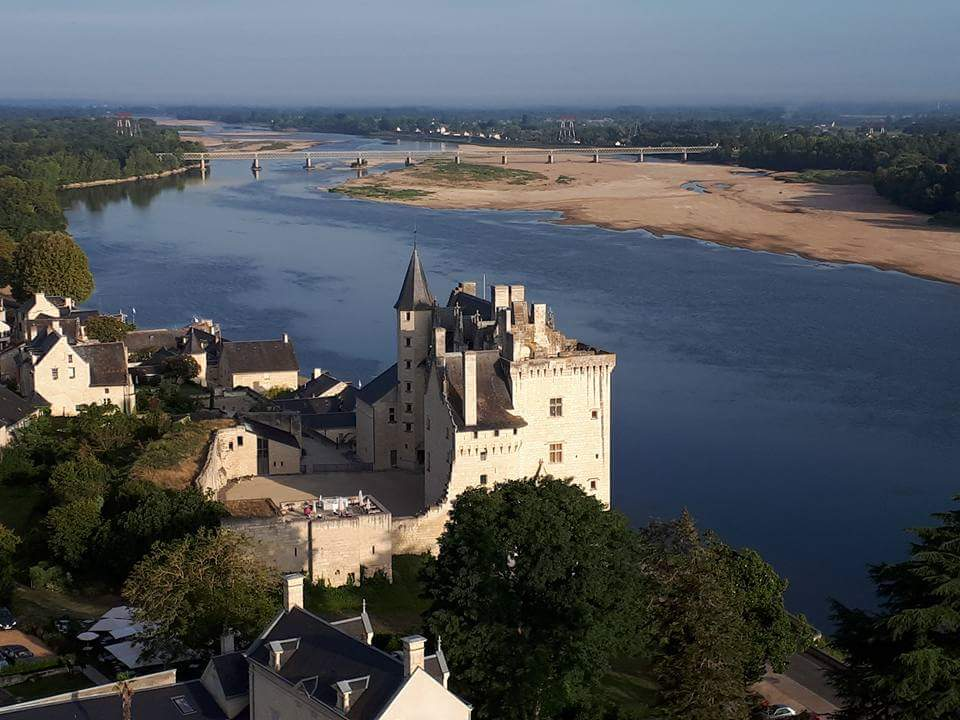
Aerial view of the castle

The widow of Louis Francois II de Bouchet Sourches, Marquis of Tourzel, sold the château and what remained of the domain of Montsoreau after 1804. Following the sale of the property, the building was occupied by 19 different homeowners who reshaped the site. The external condition of the main building is known through various representations and descriptions made in the second half of the nineteenth century, which reflect the disrepair of the property. By 1910, the château had deteriorated and this moved the members of the French Archaeological Society (Société Française d'Archéologie). Senator Geoffre asked the Maine et Loire department General Council to intervene. The department gradually acquired each property after 1913, Restoration works were undertaken in 1923 and continued until the Second World War.

After a new programme of restoration between 1997 and 2001, the château opened to visitors on 6 July 2001 with a son-et-lumiere entitled "The Imaginaries of Loire" which attracted about 35,000 visitors a year.

In June 2015, the Maine and Loire council leased the Château to Philippe Méaille, to create the Château de Montsoreau-Museum of Contemporary Art which opened to the public in April 2016. Its collection holds artworks by the Art & Language group, and organizes temporary shows, conferences and symposia.

== Geography: the site and its natural environment ==
=== Situation ===
The Château de Montsoreau is located at the convergence of two rivers, the Loire and the Vienne, and the intersection of three historical political regions Anjou, Poitou and Touraine. It is situated in a nationally protected region, the Loire-Anjou-Touraine Regional Nature Park.

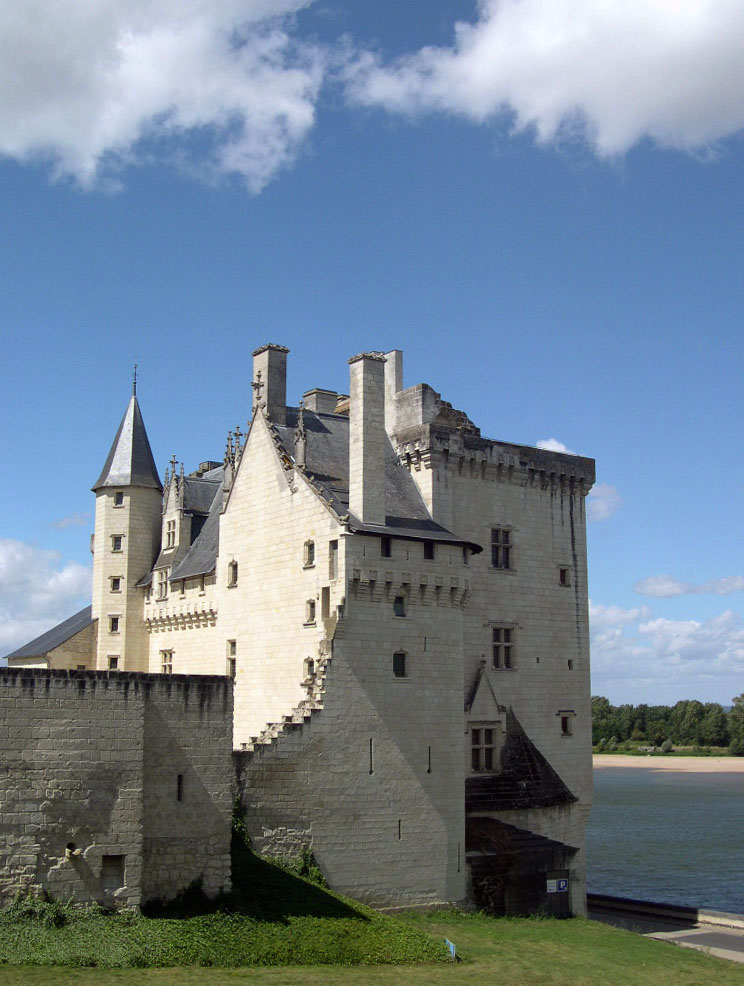
The castle (east side) in front of the Loire river

The castle was built into the bed of the Loire River, at the foot of the hillside, in tufa – the local bedrock, still visible in many places. Many local properties are built from this stone and there are many local houses built into the hillsides, and in the local caves. Its topographic position is said to be militarily impregnable, as it is located between two small valleys on a plateau of some thirty hectares with steep slopes to the east and the west.

== Architecture ==
=== Description ===
Jean II de Chambes built the Château de Montsoreau in 1455. The building marks the transition from military architecture to architecture for pleasure, as shown by the large windows, the numerous chimneys, and the attention paid to sanitation problems. The castle's central dwelling was built directly on the banks of the Loire. Unusually, two right-angled wings, looking like two square towers framing the main building, were built a few years later, at a time when round towers were usually built. This odd choice prefigures the corner pavilions of classical architecture. A spiral staircase probably existed before the current Renaissance staircase.

The ground floor and courtyard side cellars permit control of navigation on the Loire. One of those rooms has direct access to the river. The main staircase on the left side leads to the ground floor dwelling and to the first floor salon. This room, lit by five windows and with a length of seventeen metres, is heated by two monumental chimneys.

Small rooms surround the dwelling and show the transition between public and private areas. In 1473, Jean III de Chambes succeeded his father. He built a Renaissance staircase tower with a polygonal shaft topped by a terrace. The steps lead to an eight-wedged palmtree-shaped vault, quite similar to those found in Angers’ Barrault dwelling and Saumur’s town hall. The stairs are decorated by pilasters bordering the windows; medallions, putti and candelabra carried by lion's paws.

A central panel shows a helmet bearing the family's motto "Chambe Crie". The register above represents two monkeys holding the end of a chain. This chain is fixed around a loop belt under which is inscribed "Je le feray". At the other extreme of the chain, an ovoid object embellished by a leaf decoration is suspended through a hoop. A little monkey is crouching down the hoop's left side. The upper panel is carved with trees and branches representing a coppice in front of which stand a deer, the chief symbol of the hunt.

== The Château de Montsoreau in the Arts ==
=== Visual arts ===
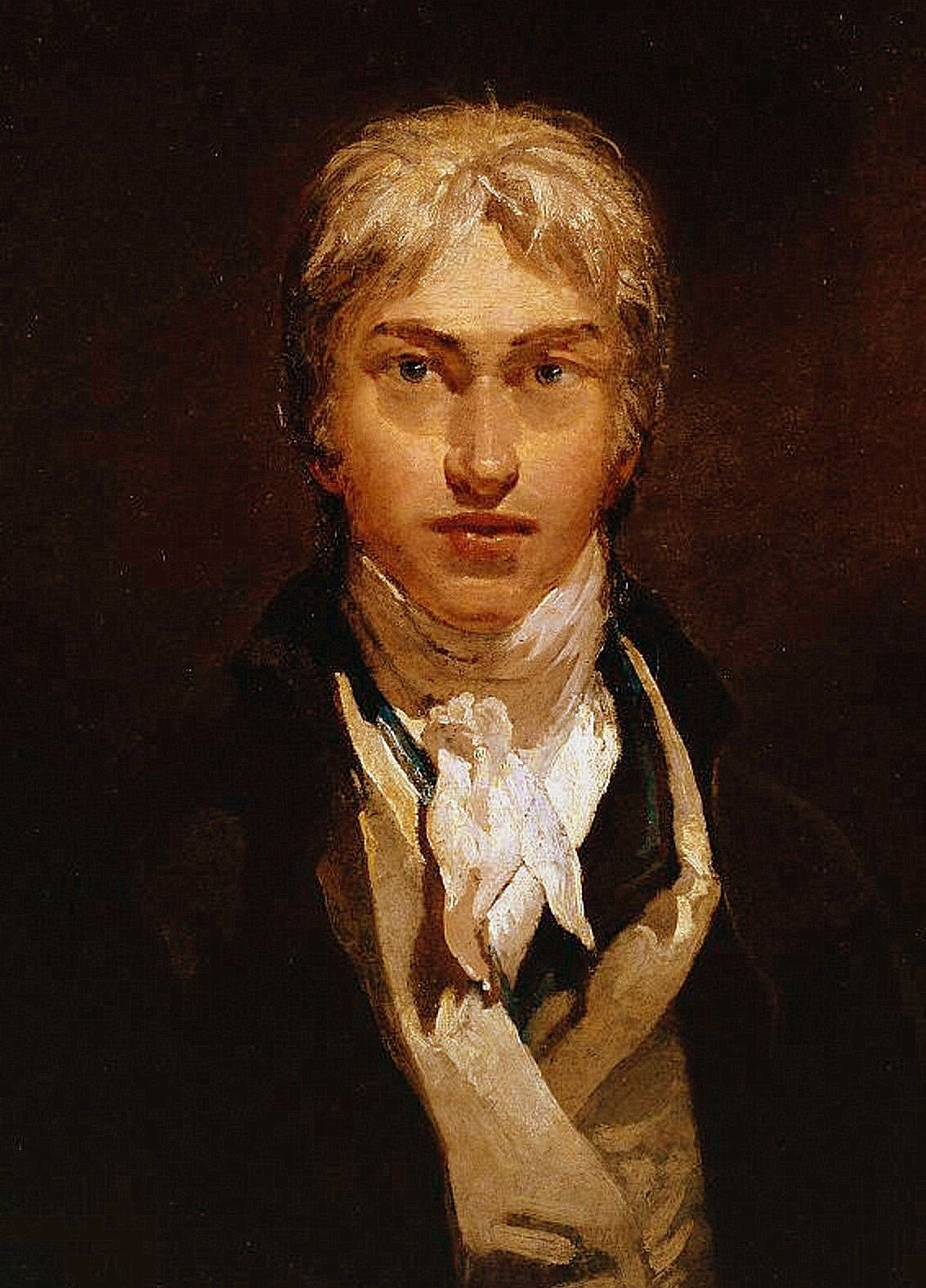
Joseph Mallord William Turner

==== Joseph Mallord William Turner ====
In October 1826, William Turner spent a short stay on the banks of the Loire and took twenty-one views of the river. He painted the château de Montsoreau and surrounding scenery. This watercolour conserved at the Ashmolean Museum in Oxford was engraved in 1832; one copy is kept at the Château de Montsoreau – Museum of Contemporary Art.

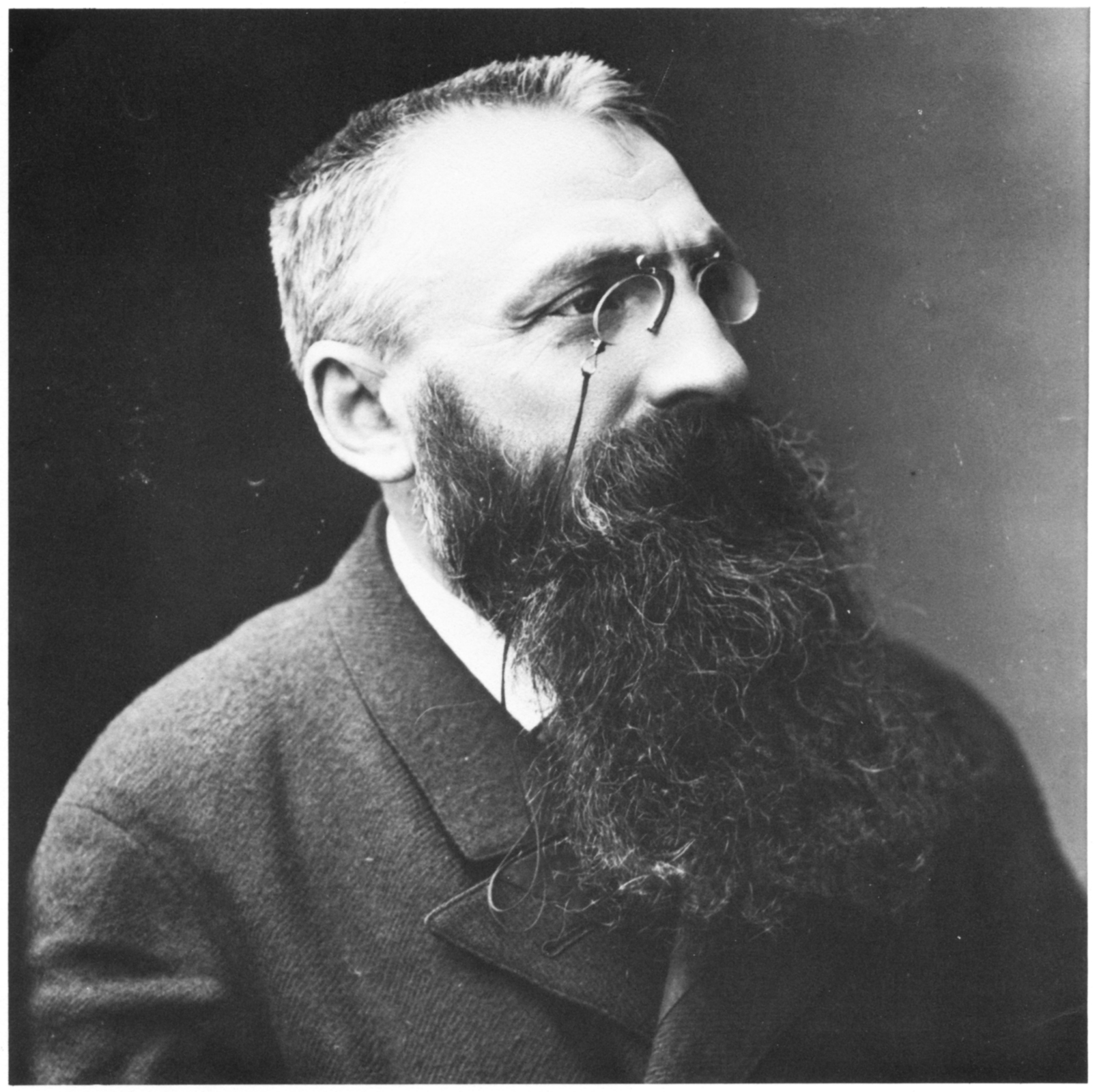
Auguste Rodin

==== Auguste Rodin ====
Auguste Rodin had the pavilion of the Exposition Universelle (to which he added a portico recovered from the Château d'Issy) reinstalled on the heights of Meudon in 1895. Two years later, around 1897, fascinated by the architecture of the château Montsoreau, he drew an idealized view of its north facade.

==== Paul-Désiré Trouillebert ====
Paul-Désiré Trouillebert, a painter of the school of Barbizon, worked in Paris and Candes-Saint-Martin. He painted several Loire landscapes in which the château de Montsoreau appears.

=== Popular culture ===
In 2019, the English magazine All About History (Future plc) publishes its 101 World's Greatest castles list and ranked the château de Montsoreau with the number 53.

== See also ==
- Châteaux of the Loire Valley
- List of castles in France
