= Petronille de Chemillé =

French abbess

Petronilla of Chemillé
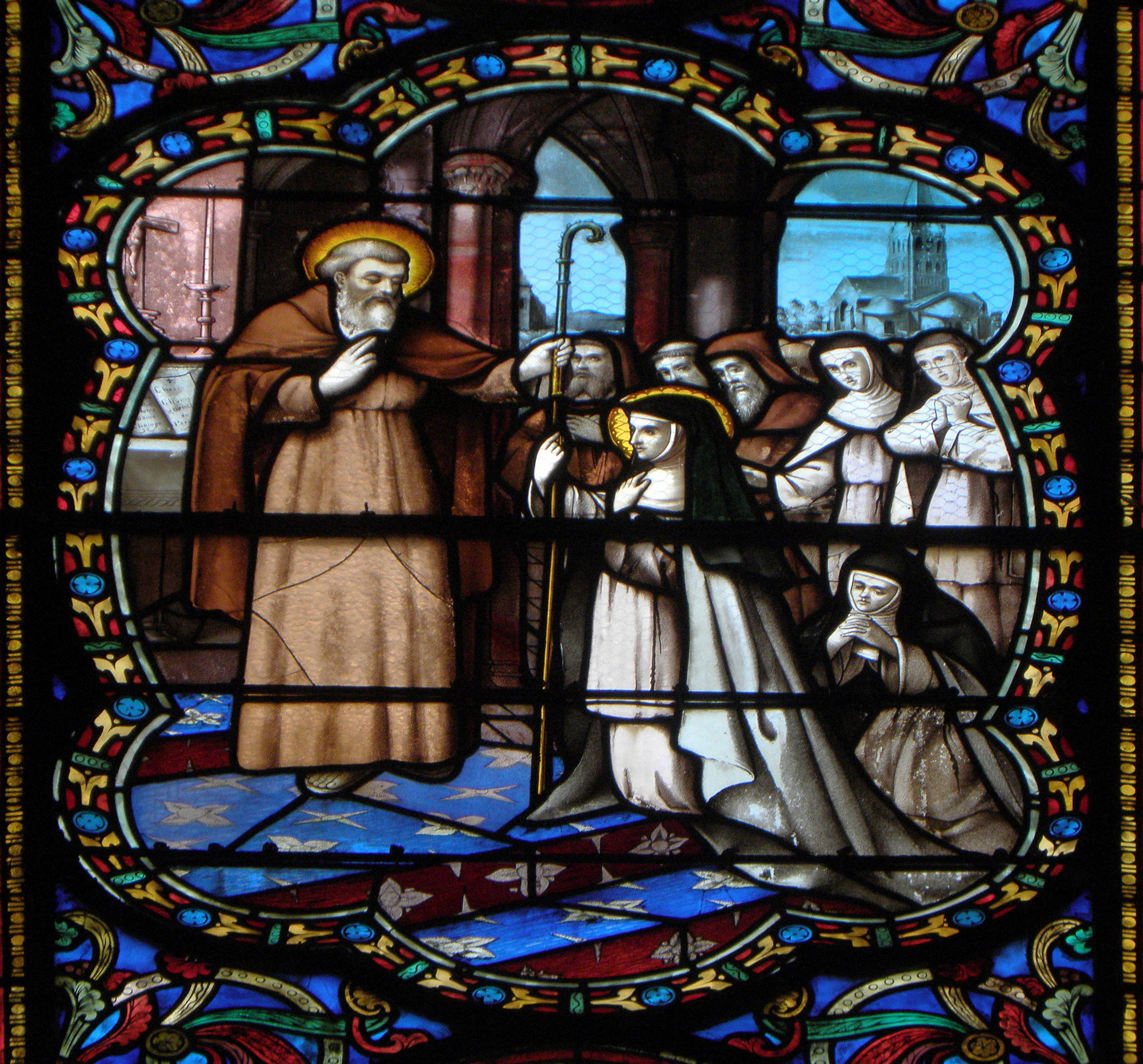
- Died: 24 April 1149
- Occupation: Superior General of the Order of Fontevrault
- Known for: First abbess of the double monastery of Fontevrault

Petronilla of Chemillé (died 24 April 1149) was first abbess of the double monastery of Fontevrault in western France, which she headed from 1115 to 1149 following her second widowhood. She is honored as Venerable by the Catholic Church.

== Biography ==
Born to Burchard de Craon and his wife Texeline, she was one of three children. Her sister, Agnes, also went on to join the Fontevrault order. Before joining Robert of Arbissel's movement early in her adulthood, Petronilla married a fellow noble and had two children. The records are unclear if she was still married to Orri the Red, Lord of Chemillé, at the time she joined Robert of Arbissel's band of followers or if she had been widowed at that point.

After Philippa of Toulouse persuaded her husband, William IX, Duke of Aquitaine, to grant Robert land for the foundation of an abbey, Robert left Hersende de Champagne as prioress and Petronilla as procuratrix in charge of monitoring the construction and organization. After Hersende's death in 1114, Petronilla ascended to the role of prioress of the new religious order.

A year before Robert's death on October 28th of 1115, he named Petronilla (by then a widow) as the first abbess of his monastery. In Andreas of Fontevraud's Second Life of Robert of Arbrissel, Robert praised Petronilla's ability to communicate with both learned people and less educated members of the community. The account also describes her initial reluctance to accept the position of abbess, though Robert maintained his decision. Petronilla commissioned the first biography of Robert of Arbrissel from his friend Baldric of Dol. She also commissioned a second biography of Robert of Arbissel, potentially due to dissatisfactions with Baldric's account. The Abbess successfully advocated for the release of Robert of Arbissel's body to Fontevrault Abbey from the Orsan Priory, where he had died.

As the abbess of a dual order under direct authority of the Pope, rather than a local bishop, Petronilla had the social and legal powers of a lay lord. She, and the abbesses that followed her, had control of vassals and large land holdings, as well as authority over who joined and left the religious order. At the time of Robert of Arbissel's death, the order had expanded to include 18 priories that came under her authority. By the end of her tenure, the order had grown to include 70 priories in France and an addition 4 in Spain, and was home to between 3,000-4,000 members.

The Order of Fontevrault celebrates the feast day of Petronilla on April 24. The Bollandists remark: "Her existence was marked by many contradictions, but she had the courage to pass beyond the judgment of human beings and to walk without deviating on the path to heaven."
