= Orsan Priory =

Priory in Cher, France; now a hotel

- Prieuré d'Orsan
- Location within France

General information
- Status: Private business
- Architectural style: Romanesque
- Location: Maisonnais, Cher, France
- Coordinates: 46.6766667°N 002.2191667°E
- Completed: 1107

Website
- Official Website

Orsan Priory (French: Prieuré d'Orsan), alternatively the Priory of Our Lady of Orsan (French: Prieuré Notre-Dame d'Orsan), is a former nunnery belonging to the Order of Fontevraud, located in the Loire Valley, in Maisonnais, Cher, France. It was founded at the beginning of the 12th century by Robert of Arbrissel and dissolved in the French Revolution. It is now (2021) a privately owned hotel with attached traditional monastic gardens created in the 1990s.

The original monastic structures were officially designated as French historic monuments on March 27, 1926.

== Foundation ==
When Robert of Arbrissel established the Abbey of Fontevraud and the Fontevriste Rule, approved by Pope Calixtus II in 1119, Orsan was still a swampy and uncultivated place. The land is believed to have been donated by Adelard of Châteaumeillant, whose former wife, Agnes, was a nun at Fontevraud Abbey.

In the 10 years following his arrival in Berry, Robert of Arbrissel founded 18 priories, all attached to Fontevraud, including that of Orsan in 1107. The nuns were first installed in a wooden structure. Robert of Arbrissel, a tireless evangelist, immediately resumed his travels, entrusting Orsan to the first prioress, Agnes de Châteaumeillant, under the administration of the Archbishop of Bourges.

The priory prospered soon after being built. Its church was completed in 1113. The lords of the region took the priory under their protection. In competition with other monasteries in the region, Orsan soon found itself on trial. Robert of Arbrissel returned to settle these disputes in 1116, and it was probably at this time that he died. He bequeathed his heart to Orsan and the rest of his body to Fontevraud. The Archbishop of Bourges, who died a few years later, gave his country house to the priory and asked to be buried near the heart of Robert of Arbrissel.

Orsan experienced continued prosperity for the next 500 years. As the burial place of the heart of Robert of Arbrissel, it became a site of pilgrimage for Catholics who attributed miracles to this holy relic. Orsan was generously patronized, thus allowing for its land holdings to be enlarged under management of the prioresses.

== Decline ==
Orsan Priory was able to escape danger in the Hundred Years' War, but experienced considerable setbacks during the French Wars of Religion. In 1569, the buildings were looted and burned. The nuns fled to the castle of Châtelet and returned a year later, noting the disappearance of many documents. Farmers and tenants then refused to pay rent. Despite this, the buildings were rebuilt in 1596, owing to the patronage of Éléonore de Bourbon, Abbess of Fontevraud. The fence and the main gate were completed in the 18th century. The priory was suppressed during the French Revolution and its lands sold, after which it became a stone quarry, and later used for farming until 1989.

== Rebirth ==
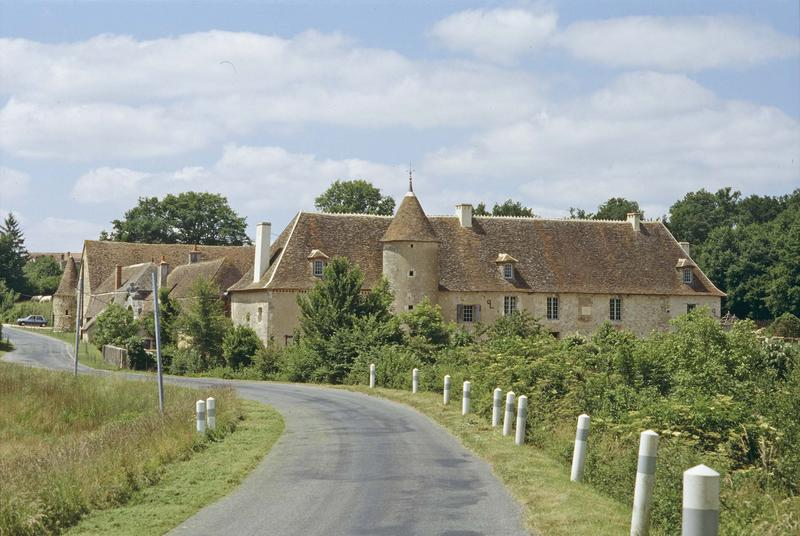
Prieure-Orsan

In 1990, only four large buildings remained from the priory, enclosing a disused farmyard where in the 1950s a chicken coop, pigsty, and metal shed had been erected. The church, the cloisters, and the mill had disappeared, their stones repurposed for agricultural constructions. In that year, architects Patrice Taravella and Sonia Lesot, were looking for a building to renovate, and discovered Orsan. The walls were dilapidated, the roofs worn and the doors without keys, with old agricultural machinery strewn about the barns and courtyard. They purchased the priory and forty hectares of adjacent woods and meadows, and began renovations in 1991.

The buildings have been listed since 1926 in the Supplementary Inventory of Historic Monuments. An architect from Bâtiments de France intervened on behalf of the restoration efforts, and national and regional grants were presented to aid in preservation. The walls were consolidated, the windows replaced and, facing a bare courtyard, the idea of creating gardens appeared.

== Gardens ==
It was not a question of reconstructing gardens in the same way, since there were no original plans, but rather of evoking medieval monastic gardens in general. The gardens were created in 1992 using medieval drawings and manuscripts to reproduced methods and designs for shaping vines, hedges and raised beds. They are maintained by master gardener Gilles Guillot; they opened to the public in 1994. The buildings were then fitted to accommodate the public: first a boutique-bookshop, then a restaurant-tearoom in 1998, and finally in 2001, six hotel rooms.

In the Middle Ages, the monastery garden was meant to nourish the body and mind, and provide the tranquillity necessary for religious contemplation. Inspired by biblical gardens, they included at least four types of garden: the potager (kitchen garden), the herbarium for medicinal plants, the orchard-cemetery, and the cloister garden. The fence, separating wilderness from civilized life, the fountain, representing the four rivers of Paradise, and the courtyard, lawn dotted with flowers and decorated with benches of greenery, arbors and pergolas, are other essential elements of medieval gardens. The design of the Orsan gardens thus adheres to three principles: function, symbolism, and harmony.

In the beginning, only a single green enclosure with a fountain at its center was intended for the reconstruction. All of the adjacent gardens: the simple ones, the orchards, the allée of berry fruits, the labyrinth, the rose garden (or "Garden of Mary"), the raised vegetable garden, the parterre, the pergolas, and the grove of olive trees were erected around this original enclosure. The flower meadow was added to mark paths for guests to follow along the stream towards the woods.

The complex has a garden shop with books on horticulture and history, a modern art gallery and a restaurant. The gardens are open from April to October; educational presentation are put on from Easter to All Saints’ Day.

The Orsan gardens have been officially recognized as a "jardin remarquable" by the French Ministry of Culture.

== In popular culture ==
The Orsan gardens were featured in the second episode, "The Gourmet Garden," of the three-part 2017 BBC docuseries Monty Don's French Gardens.

== Bibliography ==
- Lesot, Sonia; Taravella, Patrice (1997). Les jardins du prieuré Notre-Dame d'Orsan: A la recherche d'un jardin médiéval. Arles: Actes Sud. ISBN 978-2742712472.
- Lesot, Sonia (2000). Au temps des jardins médiévaux: Les saisons au prieuré d'Orsan. Paris: Éditions du Garde-Temps. ISBN 978-2913545038.
- Lesot, Sonia (2003). Orsan: Des jardins d'inspiration monastique médiévale. Moisenay: Éditions Gaud. ISBN 978-2840801139.
- Moireau, Fabrice (2005). Notre-Dame d'Orsan (Carres de Jardin). Paris: Éditions Gallimard. ISBN 978-2742414390.
