= Philippe Méaille =

French collector of contemporary art

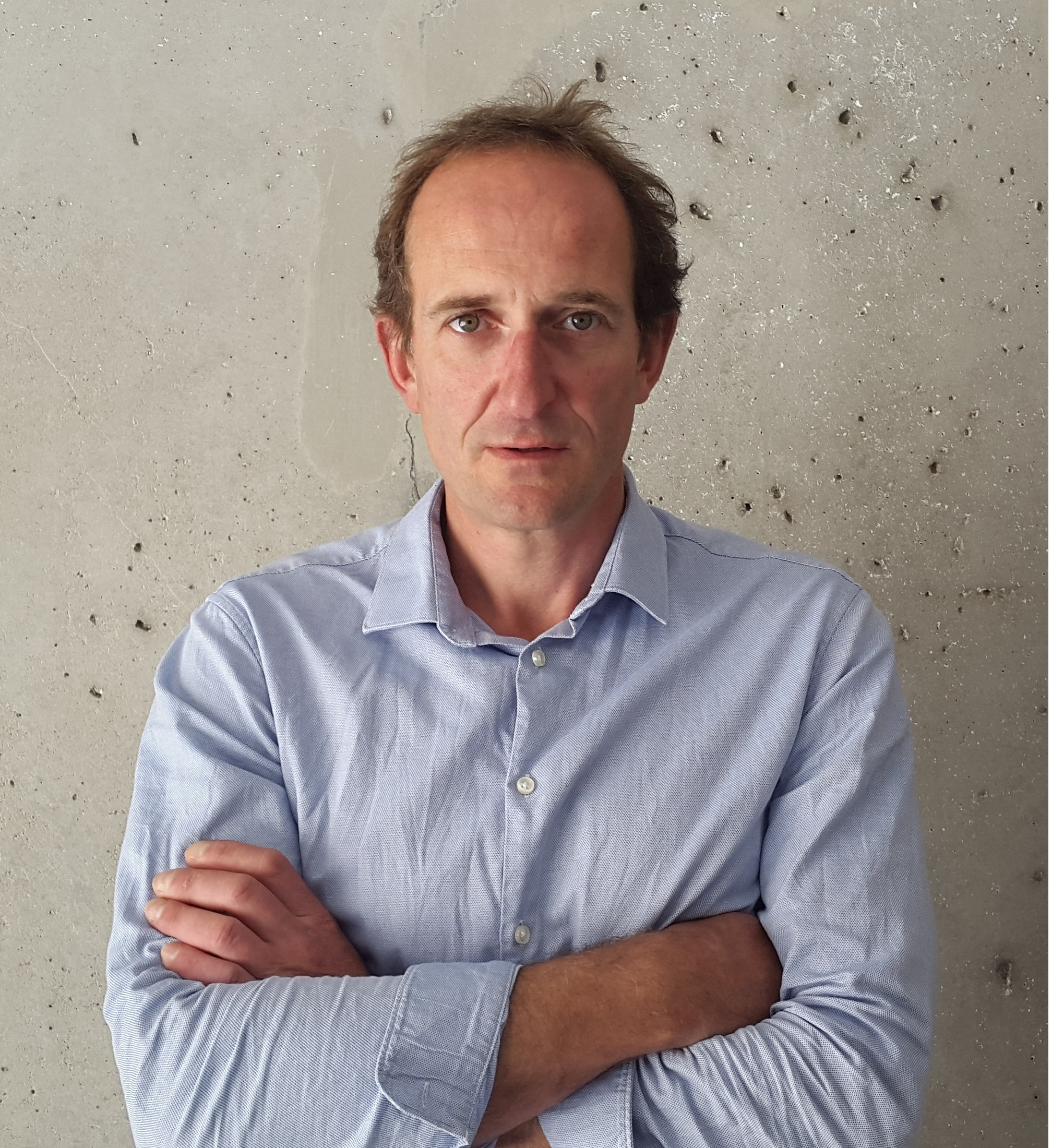
- Philippe Méaille in 2017
- Born: Philippe Méaille; 27 April 1973 (age 53); Enghien-les-Bains, France
- Education: Paris Descartes University
- Occupation: President of Château de Montsoreau-Museum of Contemporary Art

Philippe Méaille (French pronunciation: [filip meaj]; born 27 April 1973) is a French author and art collector, and the founder and president of the Château de Montsoreau-Museum of Contemporary Art. Currently, Méaille owns the world's largest collection of Art & Language works.

== Career ==
After graduating from the Lycée Vauban in Pontoise, Méaille was admitted to Paris Descartes University where he studied Pharmacy. Méaille began his art collection when he arrived in Paris as a student.

In 1994, Méaille began to build connections with Art & Language artists, including gallerist Eric Fabre. Méaille acquired a large number of works from the Swiss Rothschild Bank in 1996. These works had been purchased from the Swiss gallerist Bruno Bischofberger, in 1972.

When I was 20 or 21, I bought a work of Art & Language of 1965 called Mirror Piece and installed it in my apartment in Paris. After two or three days, I felt sad and stupid because I understood the limit imposed if these works were kept private. They would be like a discussion that was kept secret. Therefore I felt a responsibility to make this collection accessible to the widest possible public – The Private Museum of the Future, Cristina Bechtler interview with Philippe Méaille, 2016.

Méaille, has since assembled the world's largest collection of Art & Language works.

In 2000, Méaille installed his collection in the Château de la Bainerie, a former summer camp of the city of Argenteuil. The collection of Art & Language works was spread throughout the 50,000 square foot area of the château. In 2006, Méaille organized a public exhibition with Nantes school of Beaux-arts. In 2011, Méaille announced a long-term loan of 800 works of Art & Language to the MACBA. In 2014, Jill Silverman van Coenegrachts became the curator of Méaille's collection.

In 2014, the MACBA organized a major retrospective of the group Art & Language, which was titled Art & Language uncompleted: The Philippe Méaille Collection. The retrospective contained works which were loaned by Méaille.

In 2015, Méaille signed a 25-year lease for the Château de Montsoreau, a castle located in the Loire valley. That same year, Méaille founded the Château de Montsoreau-Museum of Contemporary Art, where approximately 80 works of his collection are permanently exhibited.

In 2017, Méaille decided not to renew his lease with the MACBA, and instead decided to repatriate his entire collection to the Château de Montsoreau-Museum of Contemporary Art. Méaille stated that the main reason for this decision was the political instability in Catalonia.

== Books ==
- Silverman van Coenegrachts, Jill (2014). Made in Zurich – Selected Editions – 1965–1972 Art & Language. Paris. ISBN 978-3-00-047269-5.
- Guerra, Carles (2014). Art & language uncompleted : the Philippe Méaille Collection. Barcelona: Museu d'Art Contemporani Barcelona. p. 264. ISBN 978-84-92505-52-4.
- Matthew Jesse, Jackson (2018). Art & language Reality (Dark) Fragments (Light) Philippe Méaille Collection. Montsoreau: Château de Montsoreau-Museum of contemporary Art. p. 176. ISBN 978-2955-791721.
- Chris, Dercon (2018). The Private Museum of the Future. Zurich: JRP Ringier. p. 214. ISBN 978-3037645208.
