= Boulaur =

- Commune
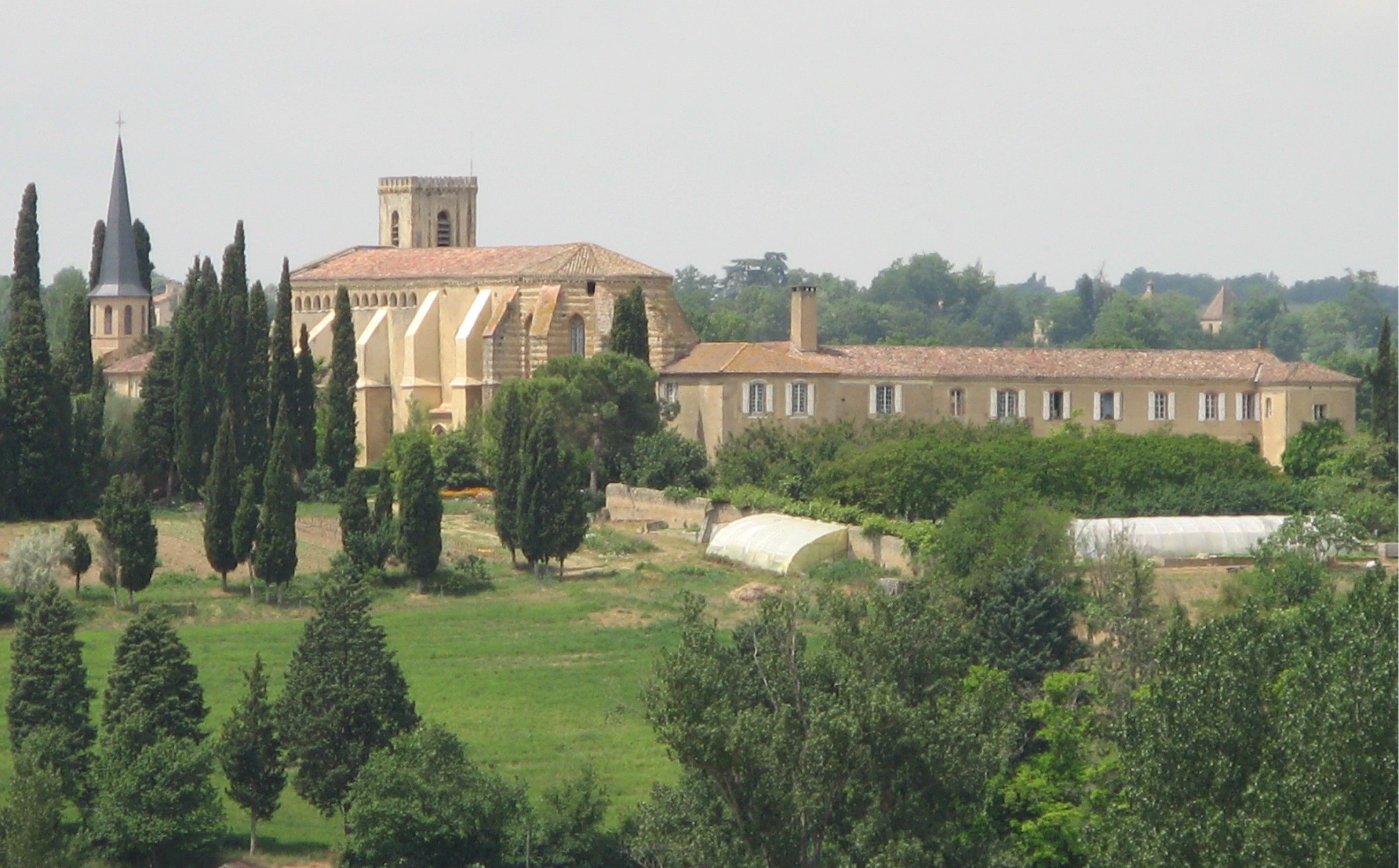
- Cistercian abbey in Boulaur
- Location of Boulaur
- Location within France Location within Occitanie
- Coordinates: 43°32′30″N 0°46′29″E
- Country: France
- Region: Occitania
- Department: Gers
- Arrondissement: Auch
- Canton: Astarac-Gimone

Government
  - Mayor (2020–2026): Antoine Faure
- Area^{1}: 9.03 km^{2} (3.49 sq mi)
- Elevation: 155 m (509 ft)
- Highest elevation: 285 m (935 ft)
- Lowest elevation: 162 m (531 ft)
- Population (2023): 171
  - Density: 18.9/km^{2} (49.0/sq mi)
- Time zone: UTC+01:00 (CET)
  - Summer (DST): UTC+02:00 (CEST)
- INSEE/Postal code: 32061 /32450
- ^{1} French Land Register data, which excludes lakes, ponds, glaciers > 1 km^{2} (0.386 sq mi or 247 acres) and river estuaries.

Boulaur (French pronunciation: [bulɔʁ]; Occitan: Bonlau) is a commune in the Gers department in southwestern France.

== Geography ==
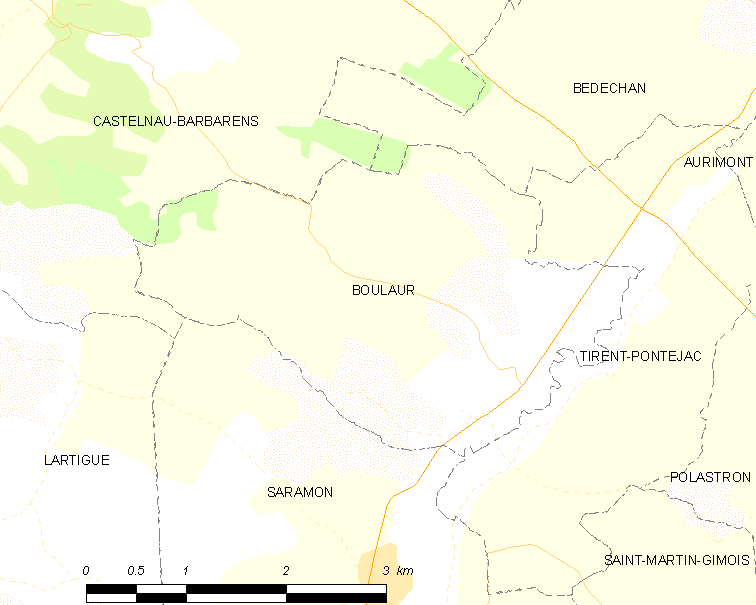
Boulaur and its surrounding communes

== Population ==
Historical population
Year	Pop.	±% p.a.
1968	163	—
1975	154	−0.81%
1982	140	−1.35%
1990	126	−1.31%
1999	128	+0.18%
2007	148	+1.83%
2012	162	+1.82%
2017	179	+2.02%
2023	171	−0.76%
Source: INSEE

== Abbey ==
Boulaur Abbey, or St Mary's Abbey, Boulaur (French: Abbaye Sainte-Marie de Boulaur), is a monastery of Cistercian nuns. It was founded in the 12th century as a priory of the Order of Fontevraud that was abolished during the French Revolution. Cistercian nuns reinstated it at the end of the 19th century but were expelled under the Associations Act of 1901 (the Waldeck-Rousseau Law). Monastic life was definitively restored in 1949. In 2011 the community had about 30 nuns. In 2022 they declared their intention to resettle the Trappist Abbey of Notre-Dame des Neiges.

== See also ==
- Communes of the Gers department
