= Robert of Arbrissel =

Beatified catholic preacher (1045–1116)

Blessed Robert of Arbrissel
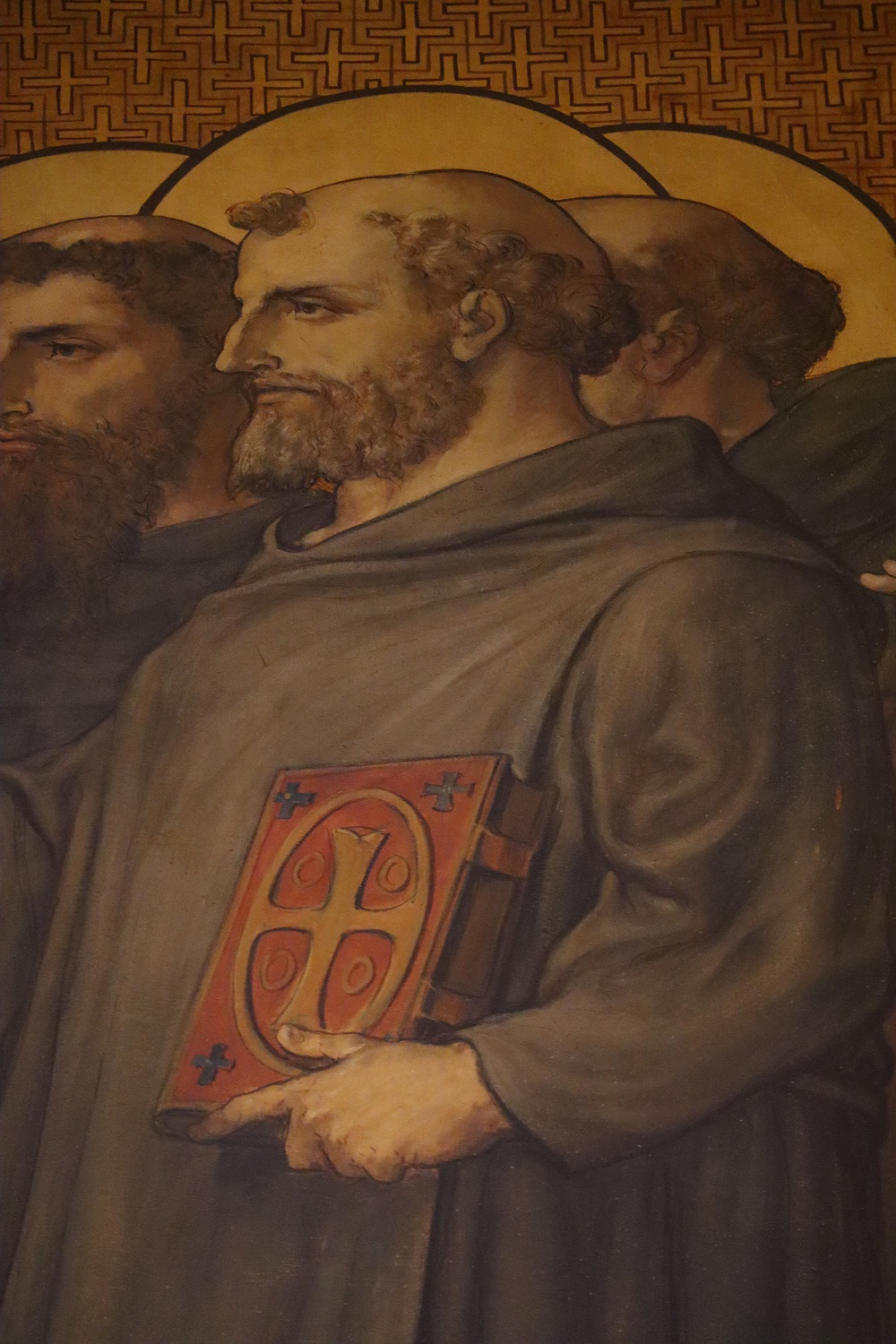
- Born: 1045; Arbrissel (near Retiers, Brittany)
- Died: 1116; Orsan Priory, Cher_(department)
- Venerated in: Catholic Church
- Major shrine: Fontevraud Abbey
- Feast: 25 February

Robert of Arbrissel (c. 1045 – 1116) was an itinerant preacher, and founder of Fontevraud Abbey. He was born at Arbrissel (near Retiers, Brittany) and died at Orsan Priory in the present department of Cher.

== Sources ==
Robert's life is primarily known from two biographies (vitae) as well as from a number of letters by other admirers and critics. The first vita was written by Baudri of Dol, bishop of Dol-en-Bretagne (formerly abbot of the monastery of Saint-Pierre of Bourgueil), shortly after Robert's death in 1116 and was likely commissioned by Petronilla. The second vita, the Vita Altera, was written by a certain Andreas, possibly Robert's chaplain and the head of Fontevraud's male priory St. Jean and is centered more on the final six months of Robert's life. While it has been suggested that Andreas was commissioned by Petronille as well, others have suggested that Andreas wrote on his behalf for the community. As both authors knew Robert personally, it is likely that the events described in these vitae are more historic than typically can be assumed in this type of medieval genre.

== Biography ==
=== Early life, studies in Paris and return to Brittany ===
Robert was born around 1045 at Arbrissel in Brittany, the son of Domalioch and Orguende. His father was a parish priest. Married priests were not entirely uncommon prior to the Gregorian reform. He probably succeeded his father as priest to the parish. Seeking to improve his education, he went to Paris where he spent some years in study, perhaps under Anselm of Laon and later displayed considerable theological knowledge. The date and place of his ordination are unknown. Sometime prior to 1076, Robert returned to his parish and supported the election of the noblemen Sylvester de La Guerche as Bishop of Rennes. The election was a simoniac one, meaning that Sylvester, "who has been described as sword-bearing illiterate who had never bee ordained a priest", bought himself into the office. Sylvester proved himself as an unfit shepherd in a time of growing spirituality and reformative zeal and thus encountered strong opposition from the reform movement. In 1078, a reform council including a papal legate of Gregory VII deposed Sylvester, chasing him out of office as well as his supporters, including Robert.

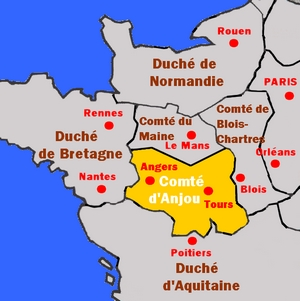
North-Western France in the mid-11th century

Robert resumed his studies in Paris until, dedicating himself to the study of religion but also likely dialectic and rhetoric as his later charismatic preaching could suggest. He spent around a decade in Paris in which he likely embraced the ideals of the church reformers as well as his ideals of eremitic asceticism.

In 1089 Robert was recalled by Bishop Sylvester who in the meantime had also taken up the ideals of the Gregorian reform who were becoming popular in all of France. For the coming four years, Robert would serve as Sylvester's archpriest, effectively running the diocese of Rennes and implementing the ideals of religious life he had lived and studied in Paris. Bishop Sylvester attempted, with Robert's assistance, to introduce reforms to celibacy and liberate churches from the influence of nobles but this provoked antagonism in Brittany, especially amongst the local clergy. Upon the death of Sylvester around 1093, Robert fled to Angers. Here he resumed his studies at the local cathedral school and made acquaintance with its schoolmaster Marbodius. In addition to his studies, he further turned more intensely to asceticism.

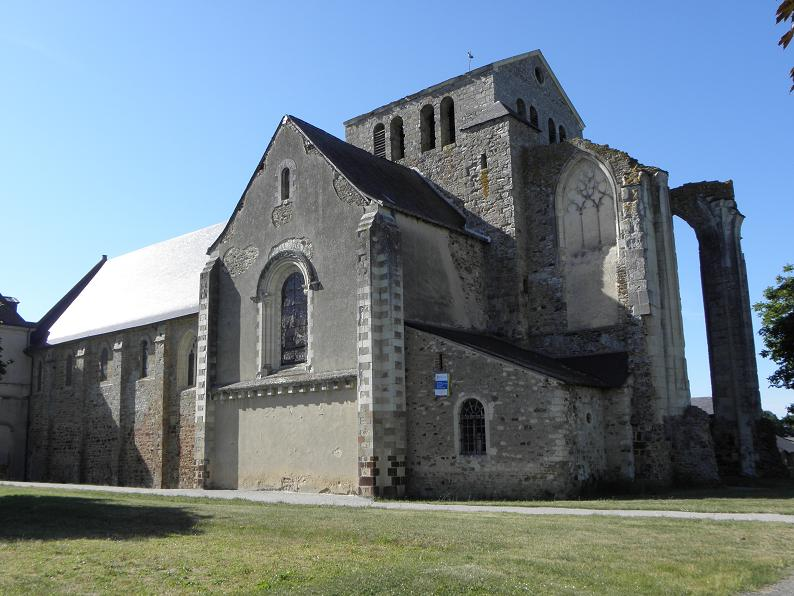
Abbey of La Roë

=== Life as hermit, itinerant preacher and foundation of La Roë ===
In 1095 he became a hermit in the forest of Craon (south-west of Laval), living a life of severe penance in the company of Bernard of Thiron, afterwards founder of the Congregation of Tiron, Vitalis, founder of Savigny Abbey, and others of considerable note. His piety, eloquence, and asceticism attracted many followers, and his fame reached Pope Urban II during his travels in France in 1095/96. While in Anger in February 1096, Urban II summoned Robert to him and asked him to preach at the dedication of the church of Saint-Nicholas as a test. Robert passed and was given a licentia praedicandi, a license to preach and initiated Robert's life as a licensed itinerant preacher. These itinerant preachers, although their teachings often bordered on heresy, helped to promote the ideas of the reform movement as well as knowledge of Church teachings in the population and spirituality became a mass phenomenon for the first time since the early Church.

Before Robert could follow Urban's call of preaching, he needed to settle down the followers he had gathered in Craon. This led to the foundation of the monastery of La Roë on land donated by Renaud I de Craon. The foundation was confirmed by Pope Urban II along with a large number of local bishops and clerics as a community of canons regular. Robert stayed during the construction time of the cabins for the canons and the church which was consecrated in April 1097. Nothing is mentioned by Baudri of Dol about the composition of Robert's first group of followers, but it is likely that women also formed part of this group. They were, however, not part of La Roë but might have been settled in other female congregations in the region. Robert's involvement seems not have gone beyond 1098 when he is last mentioned in a charter. Robert found a patron in Hildebert, Bishop of Le Mans.

=== Foundation of Fontevraud ===
Free now to engage in the new stage of life as itinerant preacher, Robert took the roads and his eloquence, heightened by his strikingly ascetic appearance, drew crowds everywhere. Those who desired to embrace the monastic state under his leadership he sent to La Roë, but the Canons objected to the number and diversity of the postulants. His occasional anticlerical preaching spared no one, leading to criticism of his former schoolmaster Marbod, now bishop of Rennes, who accused him of mentioning the crimes of "even those in high offices". He was further accused by Marbod and Abbot Geoffrey of Vendôme of sleeping in the same room as some of his female followers. It is more likely that Robert was mimicking the practice of syneisaktism, an early church practice in which male and female religious would live together in a form of chaste marriage.

These accusations led to Robert being summoned to the council of Poitiers in November 1100 which two legates of Pope Paschal II had convened earlier that same year. Fortunately for Robert there were many clerics friendly to his asceticism, among them Bishop Peter II of Poitiers, Robert's most powerful supporter. The demands of the council were therefore that the unregulated life of Robert's mixed gender group became regulated and that, most importantly, they built separate living quarters for men and women. Furthermore, the council also settled the place of settlement which was to be in the dioceses of Poitiers in the parish of Roiffe whose church Peter II personally owned. Robert also took part in the council's decision in excommunicating Philip I of France on account of his lawless union with Bertrade de Montfort, who later would later become a nun in Fontevraud.

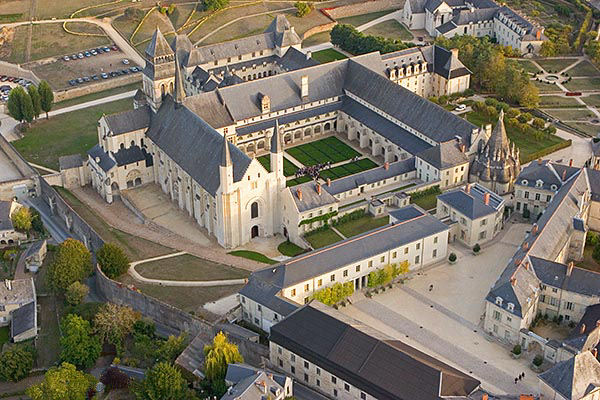
Fontevraud Abbey

This led to the foundation of the double monastery of Fontevraud. He appointed Hersende of Champagne, kinswoman to the Duke of Brittany as prioress. After Hersende's death, he appointed Petronilla, baroness of Chemille, as the first abbess. Fontrevault followed the Rule of St. Benedict. The place was well chosen as it provided the protection from ecclesiastic critics of Robert but also by being between the castles of Chinon, Saumur and Loudon from the near-anarchic and warlike political conditions that haunted Anjou in that time. Robert stayed during the construction of the abbey and afterwards took to the roads again, however, this time he kept the contact and placed all subsequent foundation under the authority of Fontevraud .

Robert's legend has long alluded to the presence of converted prostitutes and there is indeed considerable contemporary evidence for this assertion. Baldric of Dol writes of the presence amongst Robert's disciples of meretrices – a Latin word usually used at the time to refer to prostitutes, or at the very least, morally loose women. The almost-certainty of prostitutes being amongst Robert's followers is confirmed by a text discovered at the monastery of Vaux-de-Cernay. In the text, Robert visits a brothel in Rouen and speaks of sin to the prostitutes there; enraptured, they walk away into the wilderness with him. Robert aimed to “attract adulterers and prostitutes to the medicine of repentance”, the text avers. The story it relates may not be entirely true in the matters of its facts, but it relates the essential truth that Robert had prostitute followers – by virtue of showing that such a story was in common currency at the time. Robert also dedicated one of the houses at his abbey of Fontevraud to Mary Magdalene.

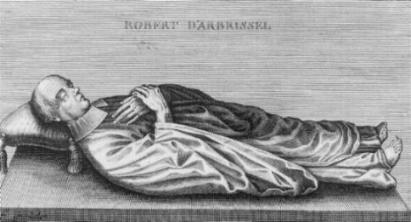
Robert of Arbrissel in the now lost tomb effigy at Fontevraud Abbey

=== Later life and death ===
Robert continued his missionary journeys over the whole of Western France till the end of his life, but little is known of this period. Pope Paschal II approved the Fontevraud Order in 1106 and the order would grow to 5,000 during Robert's lifetime. In 1110 he attended the Council of Nantes. Knowledge of his approaching death caused him to take steps to ensure the permanence of his foundation at Fontevraud. He imposed a vow of stability on his monks and summoned a Chapter (September 1116) to settle the form of government. From Haute-Bruyère, a priory founded by the penitent Bertrade, he went to Orsan, another priory of Fontevraud, where he died. His panegyric was given by his personal friend Leger, archbishop of Bourges.

== Veneration ==
The accusation made against Robert by Geoffrey of Vendôme of extreme indiscretion in his choice of exceptional ascetic practices (see P.L., CLVII, 182) was the source of much controversy during the seventeenth and eighteenth centuries. Other evidence of eccentric actions on Robert's part and scandals among his mixed followers may have helped to give rise to these rumors. The Fontevrists did everything in their power to discredit the attacks on their founder.

The accusatory letters of bishop Marbodius of Rennes and Geoffrey of Vendôme were without sufficient cause declared to be forgeries and the MS. Letter of Peter of Saumur was made away with, probably at the instigation of Jeanne Baptiste de Bourbon, Abbess of Fontevraud. This natural daughter of Henry IV of France applied to Pope Innocent X for the beatification of Robert, her request being supported by Louis XIV and Henrietta of England. In the event, Robert was never canonized, but he was beatified and so is venerated by the Catholic Church as "Blessed" and recorded as such in the current edition of the Roman Martyrology. In places where this has been authorized, he may be celebrated on February 25.

The original recension of the Rule of Fontevraud no longer exists; the only surviving writing of Robert is his letter of exhortation to Ermengarde of Brittany.

== Legacy ==
Robert of Arbrissel undoubtedly prepared the wave of convent foundations in the twelfth and thirteenth century. Many noble women would become nuns at Fontevraud Abbey and several members of Angevin royalty are interred in the abbey.

Robert's life and his foundation of an abbey where male monks where subject to a female abbess has created repeated interest in his life over the centuries by historians and cultural scholars. He has been portrayed as proto-feminist, religious radical, ascetic or even an early fighter for class struggles on a mission to change the order of the world.

== Sources ==
- Dalarun, Jacques. (2006) Robert of Arbrissel: Sex, Sin, and Salvation in the Middle Ages. Translated by B. L. Venarde. Washington, D.C.: Catholic University of America Press
- Kerr, Berenice M. (Jul 1999). Religious Life for Women c. 1100 – c. 1350: Fontevraud in England. Clarendon Press. ISBN 9780191542862.
- Müller, Annalena (2021). From the Cloister to the State: Fontevraud and the Making of Bourbon France, 1642–1100. Routledge. ISBN 9781000436297.
- Venarde, Bruce L., ed. and trans.(2003) Robert of Arbrissel: a Medieval Religious Life. Washington, D. C.: Catholic University of America Press
