= Hersende of Champagne =

Founder and first Abbess of Fontevraud Abbey

Hersende of Champagné
- Born: 1060; Anjou
- Died: 1 December 1114 (aged 53–54); Fontevraud Abbey
- Other names: Hersende de Champagné; Hersende of Champagne; Hersend of Montsoreau; Hersend of Champagne; Hersende of Fontevrault
- Children: Stephen (d.1130)

Hersende of Champagne (1060 – 1 December 1114) was the daughter of Humbert I of Champagne and a founder and first Prioress of Fontevraud Abbey.

== Biography ==
Hersende was born in Anjou to a noble French family in or after 1060. Hersende had been married twice and widowed twice. Her second husband was Guillaume de Montsoreau, an Anjou nobleman. With Guillaume, Hersende had a son named Stephen, who became a canon at the church of Candes Saint-Martin. She became a disciple of Robert of Arbrissel. Hersende persuaded her step-son, Gautier of Montsoreau, to provide her with the land to found the abbey. Robert was a believer in double monasteries, which consisted of separate quarters of men and women under the management of the Abbess. Hersende became the first Prioress of the Abbey of Fontevraud, overseeing the construction of the abbey herself. This was the Motherhouse of the Order of Fontevraud. Hersende died in Fontevraud Abbey.

It has been postulated that Hersende may be the mother of Héloïse, the noted medieval philosopher and abbess as well as the wife and lover of Abelard. Both Hersende the Prioress and Hersende the mother of Héloïse share the same death date and descriptions of familial ties.
