= Fontevraud Abbey =

Monastery in Fontevraud-l'Abbaye, France

- Abbaye Notre-Dame de Fontevraud
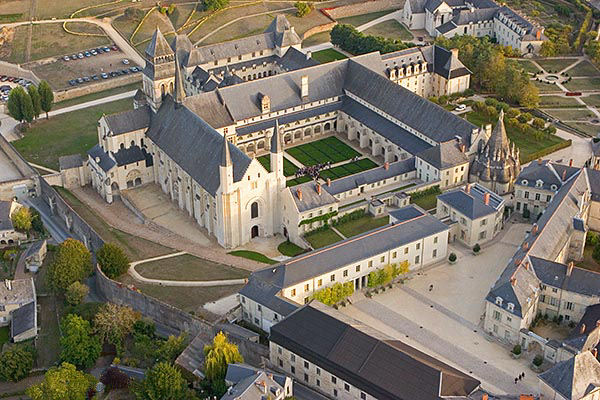
- Interactive map of Fontevraud Abbey

Monastery information
- Full name: Abbey of Our Lady of Fontevraud
- Other name: Abbey of Fontevrault
- Order: Order of Fontevrault
- Established: 1101
- Disestablished: 1792
- Dedication: Our Lady
- Diocese: Angers

People
- Founder: Blessed Robert of Arbrissel
- Important associated figures: Henry II of England, Eleanor of Aquitaine, Richard the Lionheart

Architecture
- Status: Suppressed
- Functional status: Cultural center and museum
- Heritage designation: Historic monument of France, World Heritage Site
- Designated date: 1840
- Style: Romanesque, Gothic, Classical
- Groundbreaking: 1101

Site
- Coordinates: 47°10′53″N 0°03′06″E

The Royal Abbey of Our Lady of Fontevraud or Fontevrault (in French: abbaye de Fontevraud) was a monastery in the village of Fontevraud-l'Abbaye, near Chinon, in the former French Duchy of Anjou. It was founded in 1101 by the itinerant preacher Robert of Arbrissel. The foundation flourished and became the centre of a new monastic Order, the Order of Fontevraud. This order was composed of double monasteries, in which the community consisted of both men and women – in separate quarters of the abbey – all of whom were subject to the authority of the Abbess of Fontevraud. The Abbey of Fontevraud itself consisted of four separate communities, all managed by the same abbess.

The first permanent structures were built between 1110 and 1119. The area where the Abbey is located was then part of what is sometimes referred to as the Angevin Empire. The English king Henry II, his wife, Eleanor of Aquitaine, and their son, King Richard the Lionheart, were all buried here at the end of the 12th century. It was seized and disestablished as a monastery during the French Revolution.

The Abbey is situated in the Loire Valley, a UNESCO World Heritage Site, between Chalonnes-sur-Loire and Sully-sur-Loire within the Loire-Anjou-Touraine French regional natural park (Parc naturel régional Loire-Anjou-Touraine).

The complex of monastic buildings served as a prison from 1804 to 1963. Since 1975, it has hosted a cultural centre, the Centre Culturel de l'Ouest.

== History ==
=== Founder ===
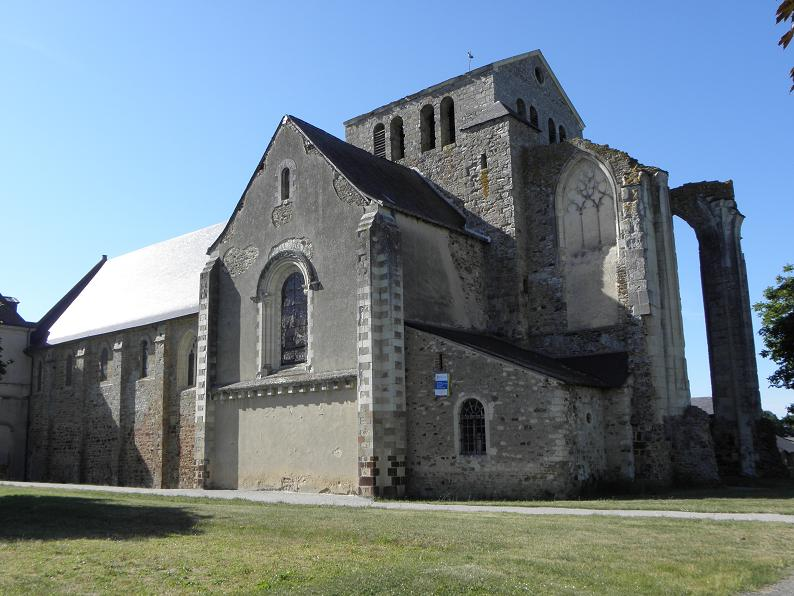
Abbey of La Roë

Robert of Arbrissel had served as the Archpriest of the Diocese of Rennes, carrying out the reformist agenda of its bishop. When the bishop died in 1095, Robert was driven out of the diocese due to the hostility of the local clergy. He then became a hermit in the forest of Craon, where he practiced a life of severe penance, together with a number of other men who went on to found major monastic institutions. His eloquence and asceticism attracted many followers, for whom in 1096 he founded a monastery of canons regular at La Roë, of which he was the first abbot. In that same year Pope Urban II summoned him to Angers and appointed him an apostolic missionary, authorizing him to preach anywhere. His preaching drew large crowds of devoted followers, both men and women, even lepers. As a result, many men wished to embrace the religious life, and he sent these to his abbey. When the canons of that house objected to the influx of candidates of lower social states, he resigned his office and left the community.

Map of the Abbey

=== Fontevraud ===
Around 1100 Robert and his followers settled in a valley called Fons Ebraldi where he established a monastic community. Initially the men and women lived together in the same house, in an ancient ascetic practice called Syneisaktism. This practice had been widely condemned by Church authorities, however, and under pressure the community soon segregated according to gender, with the monks living in small priories where they lived in community in service to the nuns and under their rule. Sometime before 1106, Fulk IV, Count of Anjou gave a significant property gift to the abbey.

They were recognized as a religious community in 1106, both by the Bishop of Angers and by Pope Paschal II. Robert, who soon resumed his life of itinerant preaching, appointed Hersende of Champagne to lead the community. Later her assistant, Petronilla of Chemillé, was elected as the first abbess in 1115.

Robert wrote a brief Rule of Life for the community, based upon the Rule of St. Benedict. Unlike the other monastic orders characterized by double monasteries, the monks and nuns of the Order of Fontevrault followed the same Rule. In his Rule, Robert dealt with four principal points: silence, good works, food and clothing, encouraging the utmost in simplicity of life and dress. He directed that the abbess should never be chosen from among those who had been brought up at Fontevrault, but that she should be someone who had had experience of the world (de conversis sororibus). This latter injunction was observed only in the case of the first two abbesses and was canceled by Pope Innocent III in 1201. At the time of Robert's death in 1117, there were about 3,000 nuns in the community.

In the early years the Plantagenets were great benefactors of the abbey and while Isabella d'Anjou was the abbess, King Henry II's widow, Eleanor of Aquitaine, made the abbey her place of residence. Abbess Louise de Bourbon left her crest on many of the alterations to the abbey building which she made during her term of office.

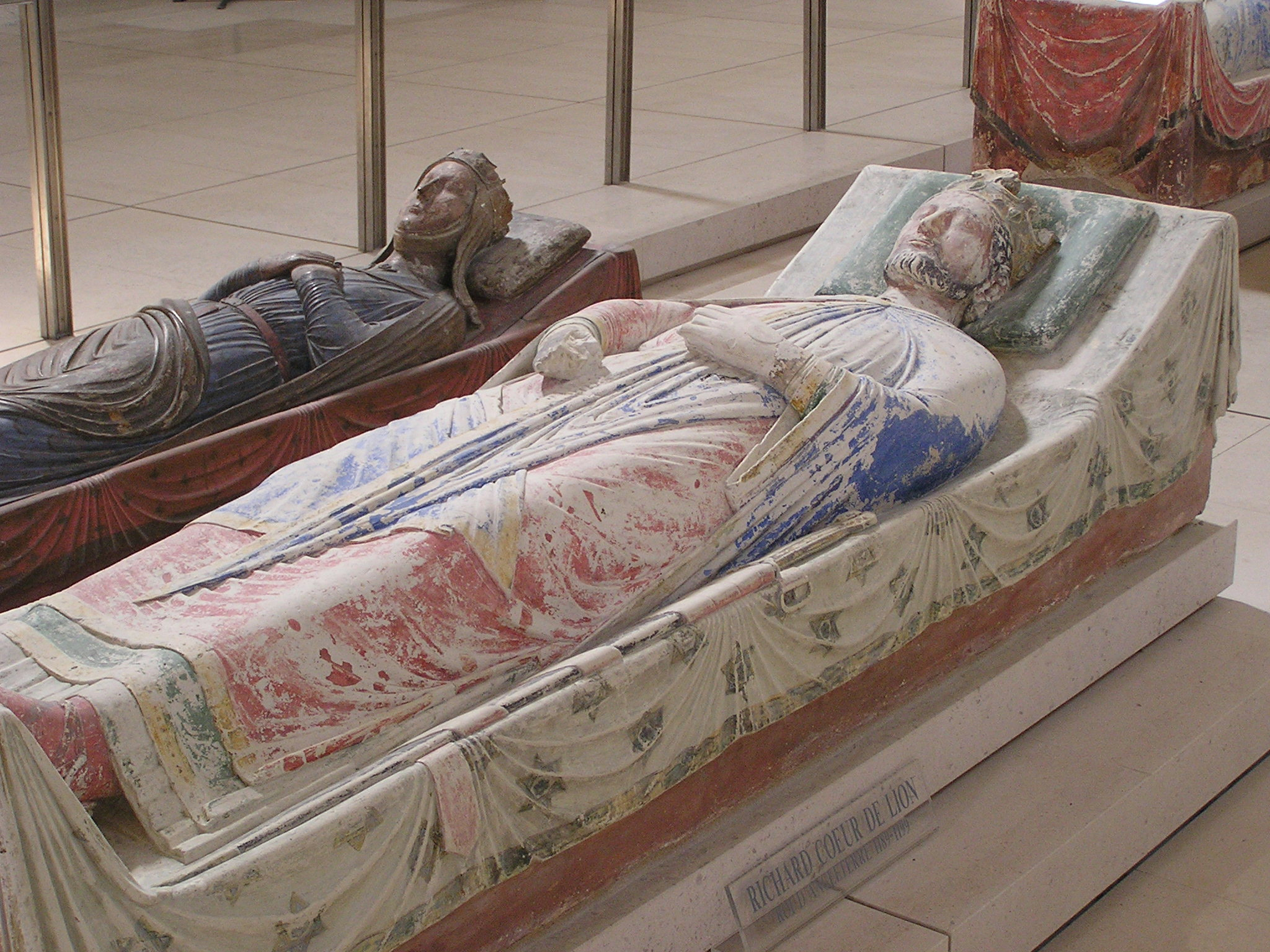
Tomb effigies of King Richard I of England (right) and Queen Isabella of Angoulême (left)

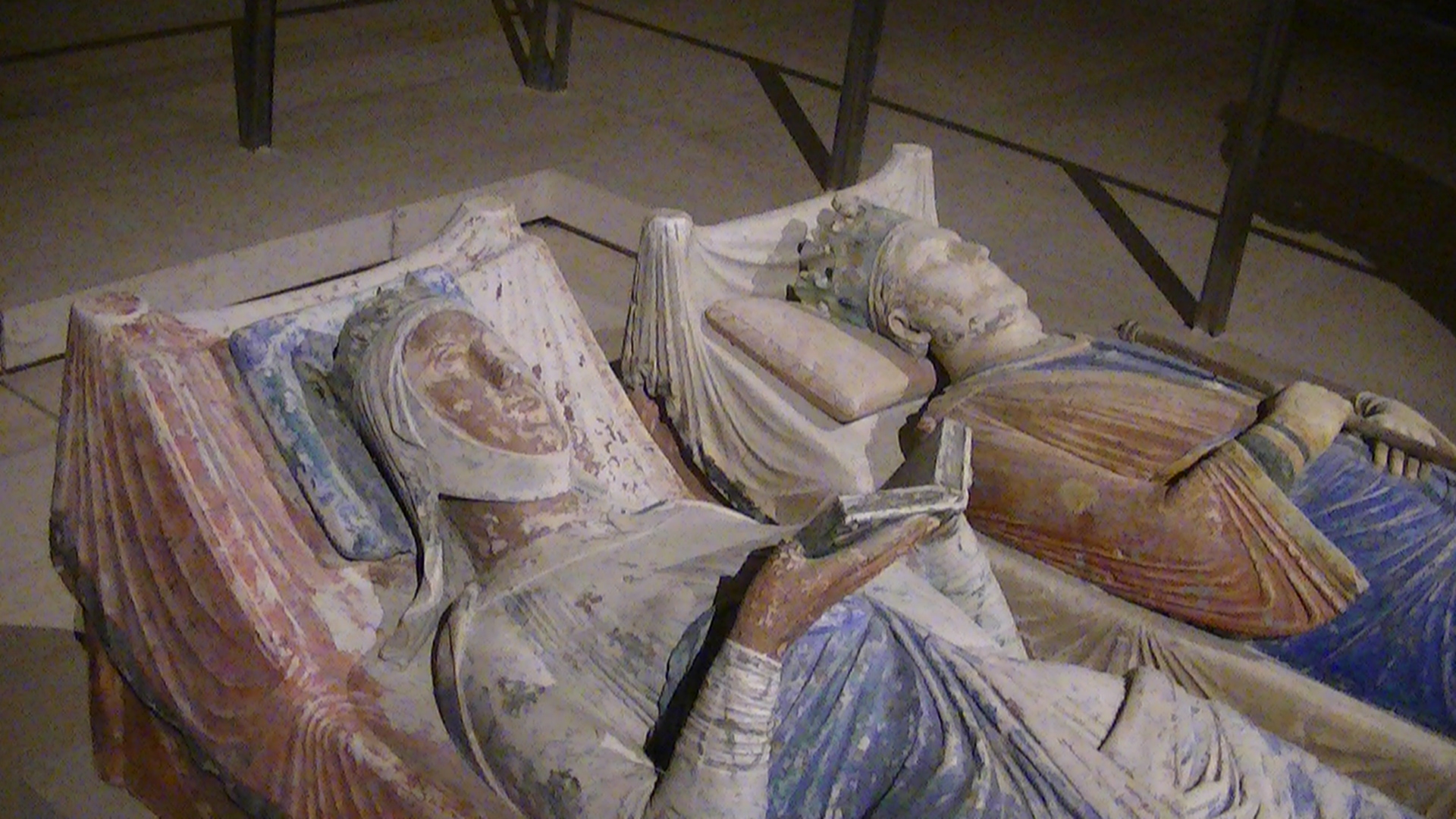
Effigies of Queen Eleanor of Aquitaine (left) and King Henry II of England (right)

=== Decline and suppression ===
With the passing of the Plantagenet dynasty, Fontevrault and her dependencies began to fall upon hard times. At the end of the 12th century, the Abbess of Fontevrault, Matilda of Flanders (1189–1194), complained about the extreme poverty which the abbey was suffering. As a result, in 1247 the nuns were permitted to receive inheritances to provide income for their needs, contrary to monastic custom.

Due to financial pressures the youngest four of the six daughters of Louis XV were sent to the abbey to be raised. Each was brought up at the abbey until the age of 15. In November 1789, all property of the Catholic Church in France was declared to be the property of the nation. On 17 August 1792, a Revolutionary decree ordered evacuation of all monasteries, to be completed by 1 October 1792. At that time, there were still some 200 nuns and a small community of monks in residence at Fontevraud. The last abbess, Julie Sophie Charlotte de Pardaillan d'Antin, is said to have died in poverty in Paris in 1797.

=== Prison and heritage site ===
The abbey became a prison in 1804. It was planned to hold 1,000 prisoners and the former abbey required major changes, including new barracks in addition to the transformation of monastic buildings into dormitories, workshops, and common areas. Prisoners—men, women and children—began arriving in 1814. Eventually it held some 2,000 prisoners, earning the prison the reputation of being the "toughest in France after Clairvaux" (also a former abbey). Political prisoners were subjected to the harshest conditions. Under the Vichy Government, some French Resistance prisoners were shot there.

In 1963 it was given to the French Ministry of Culture, and a major restoration was undertaken. In 1975 the Centre culturel de l'Ouest was formed to preserve the abbey and promote it as a cultural venue. The complex was opened to the public in 1985. Restoration of the abbey church according to the earlier restoration under the architect Lucien Magne was completed in 2006.

== List of abbesses ==
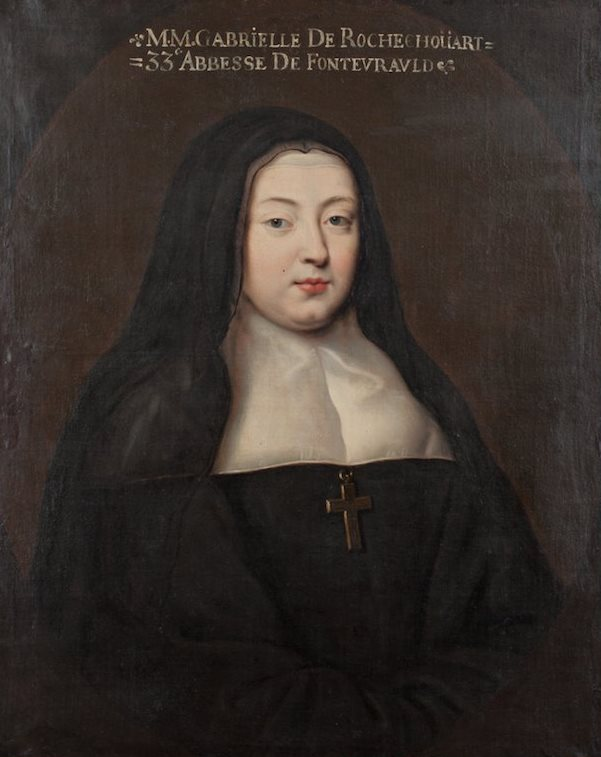
Abbess Gabrielle de Rochechouart (1645–1704)

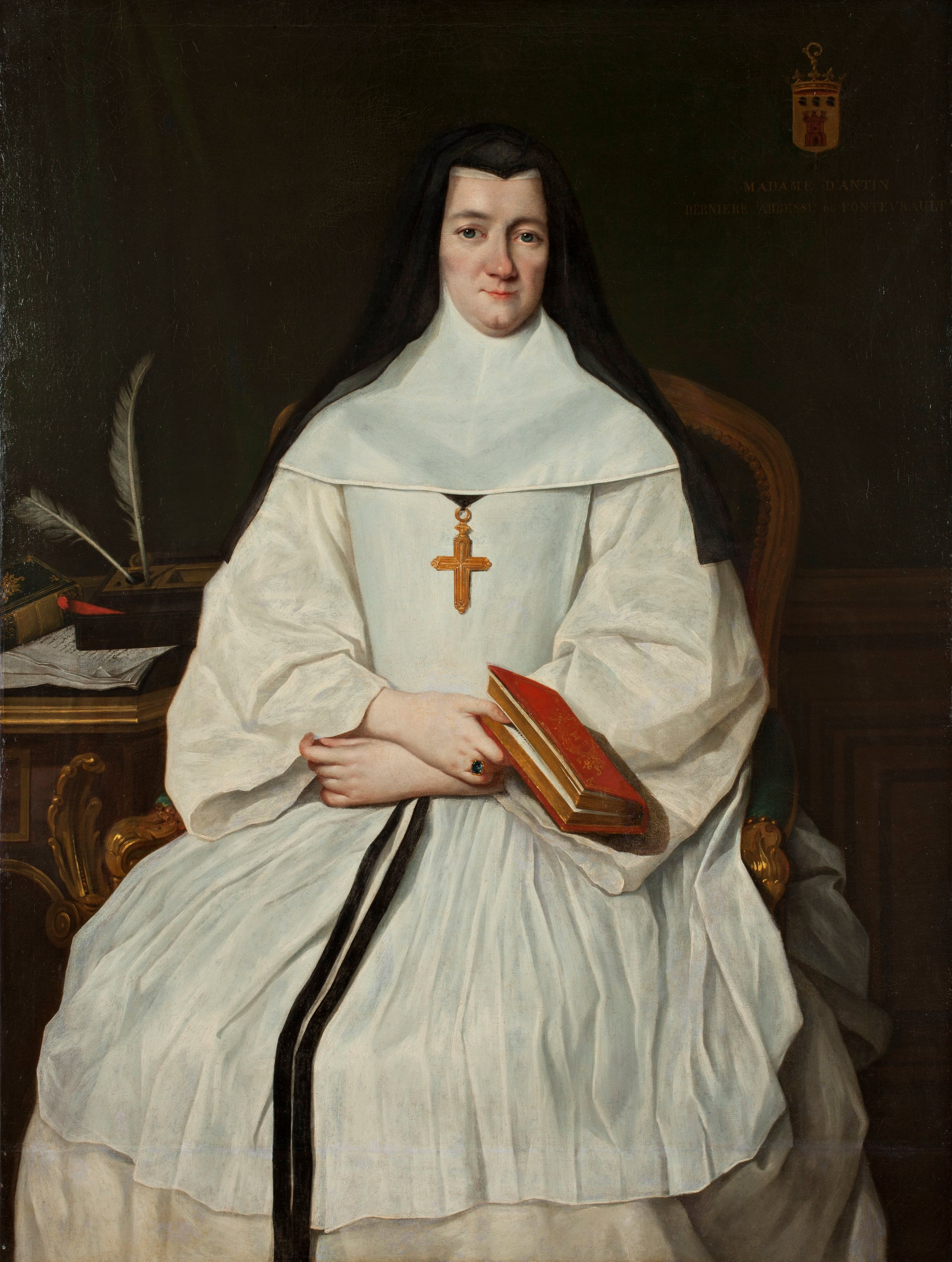
Abbess Julie de Pardaillan (1725–1797)

- Petronille de Chemillé (1115–1149)
- Matilda of Anjou (1149–1154)
- Audeburge of Hautes-Bruyères (1155–1180) She founded Amesbury Abbey, near Stonehenge in England, in 1177
- Gilles or Gillette (1180–1189)
- Adélaide (1189)
- Matilda of Flanders (1189–1194)
- Matilda of Bohemia (1194–1207)
- Marie of Burgundy (1207–1208) widow of Odo II, Duke of Burgundy
- Alice of Bourbon (1208–1209) daughter of the previous abbess
- Adele (or Alice) of Brittany (1209–1218) daughter of Bertha, Duchess of Brittany, and her second husband Odo II, Viscount of Porhoët
- Bertha (1218–1228)
- Alice of Blois (1228–1244) daughter of Theobald V, Count of Blois, and his second wife Alix of France.
- Mabile of La Ferté (1244–1265)
- Jeanne de Dreux (1265–1276)
- Isabeau Davoir (1276–1284)
- Marguerite de Pocey (1284–1304)
- Eleanor of Brittany (1304–1342)
- Isabel of Valois (1342–?)
- Marie of Brittany (1457–1477)
- Anne of Orléans (1477–1491)
- Renée de Bourbon (1491–1534)
- Louise de Bourbon (1534–1575)
- Éléonore de Bourbon (1575–1611)
- Louise de Bourbon de Lavedan (1611–1637)
- Jeanne-Baptiste de Bourbon (1637–1670)
- Gabrielle de Rochechouart de Mortemart (1670–1704)
- Louise-Françoise de Rochechouart de Mortemart (1704–1742), niece of the previous abbess
- Marie-Louise de Timbrone (1753–1765)
- Julie-Gillette de Pardaillan d'Antin (1765–1792)

== Features ==
The abbey was originally the site of the graves of King Henry II of England, his wife Eleanor of Aquitaine, their son King Richard I of England, their daughter Joan, their grandson Raymond VII of Toulouse, and Isabella of Angoulême, wife of Henry and Eleanor's son King John. However, there is no remaining corporal presence of Henry, Eleanor, Richard, or the others on the site. Their remains were possibly destroyed during the French Revolution. The bodies of the French monarchs were likewise removed from the Basilica of St Denis in 1793 by order of the French government.

Henriette Louise de Bourbon, granddaughter of Louis XIV and Madame de Montespan, grew up here. Princess Thérèse of France, daughter of Louis XV, is also buried here.

== Cultural references ==
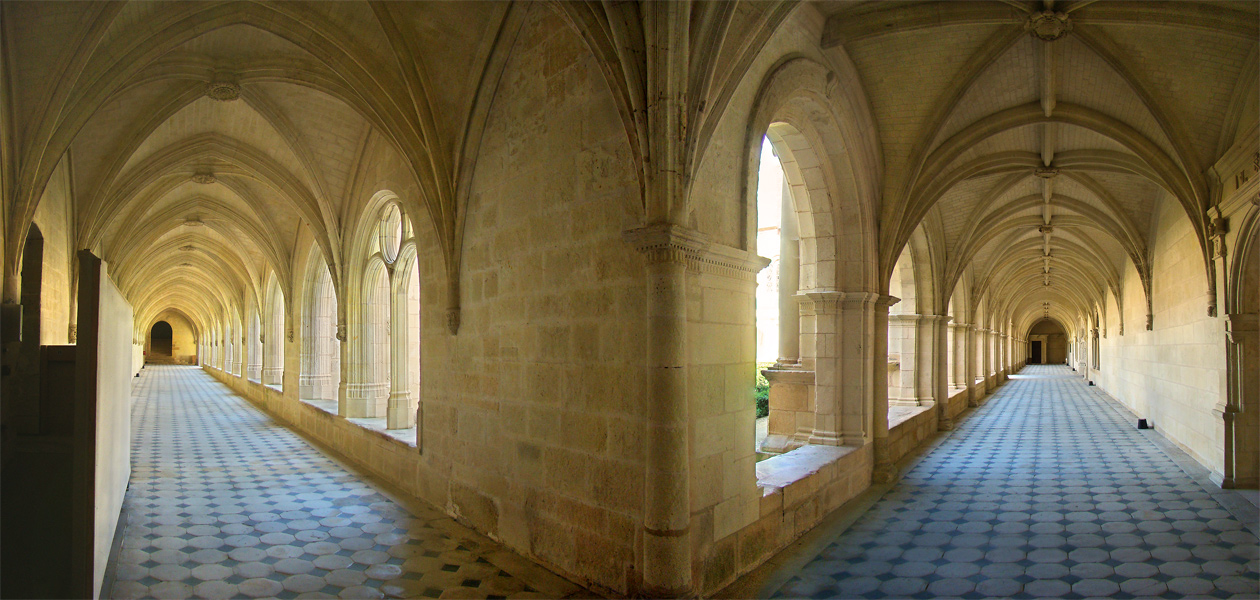
The cloister galleries

Jean Genet described the experiences of a thirty-year-old prisoner at Fontevraud in his semi-autobiographical novel, Miracle de la rose, although there is no evidence that Genet was ever imprisoned there himself.

La Cage aux Rossignols (A Cage of Nightingales), a French film released in 1945, was filmed at the abbey.

== See also ==
- High medieval domes

== Sources ==
- Alvira, Martín (2020). “Dilecta consanguinea mea. A Donation of Fernando III to a Nun of Fontevraud”. In Holt, Edward L.; Witcombe, Teresa (eds.). The Sword and the Cross. Castile-León in the Era of Fernando III. Leiden: Brill, p. 105-139.
- Vincent, Nicholas (2007). "The Court of Henry II". In Harper-Bill, Christopher; Vincent, Nicholas (eds.). Henry II: New Interpretations. The Boydell Press.
- Berman, Constance Hoffman (2018). The White Nuns: Cistercian Abbeys for Women in Medieval France. University of Pennsylvania Press.
- Mews, Constant J. (2006). "Negotiating the Boundaries of Gender in Religious Life: Robert of Arbrissel and Hersende, Abelard and Heloise". Viator. 37. CMRS Center for Early Global Studies: 113–148. doi:10.1484/J.VIATOR.2.3017481.
- Melot, Michel (1971) L'abbaye de Fontevrault. Paris: Jacques Lanore
- Müller, Annalena (2014), Forming and Re-Forming Fontevraud. Monasticism, Geopolitics, and the Querelle des Frères (c. 1100–1643), doctoral dissertation, Yale University 2014.
- Pohu, J. (1961) L'abbaye royale de Fontevrault. Fontevraud: l'abbé Pohu
- Pohu, J. (1979) The royal abbey of Fontevraud. Fontevraud: l'abbé Pohu
