= Order of Fontevraud =

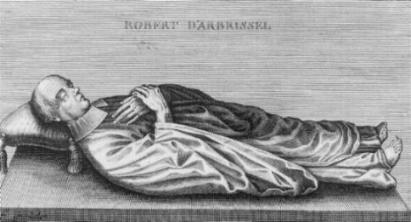
Tomb effigy of the Order's founder Robert of Arbrissel.

The Fontevraud Order or Order of Fontevraud was a monastic order founded in 1101 by Robert of Arbrissel, with a rule based on the Benedictine Rule. It was initially a double rule, with neighbouring but separate houses for men and women, both under the same rule and both under the authority of the Abbess of Fontevraud. It became a women-only order early in the 15th century. One of its daughter houses was Nuneaton Priory.

Robert wrote a brief Rule of Life for the community, based upon the Rule of St. Benedict. Unlike the other monastic orders characterized by double monasteries, the monks and nuns of the Order of Fontevrault followed the same Rule. In his Rule, Robert dealt with four principal points: silence, good works, food and clothing, encouraging the utmost in simplicity of life and dress. He directed that the abbess should never be chosen from among those who had been brought up at Fontevrault, but that she should be someone who had had experience of the world (de conversis sororibus). This latter injunction was observed only in the case of the first two abbesses and was canceled by Pope Innocent III in 1201. At the time of Robert's death in 1117, there were about 3,000 nuns in the community.

In its heyday it was protected by the House of Plantagenet then the Capet branch of the House of Bourbon. The Order's fragile economic basis was exacerbated by the devastation of the Hundred Years War, which lasted throughout the 14th century. A canonical visitation of fifty of the priories of the Order in 1460 showed most of them to be barely occupied, if not abandoned. It and its mother house of Fontevraud Abbey were suppressed in 1790 due to the French Revolution, with an attempt to revive it by Mme Rose in 1806 as one for women only and following a modified rule.

== Specific features of the Order ==
Less powerful and influential but more rich than its Cluniac or Cistercian counterparts, the Order adapted the Benedictine Order to create a double community in which the monks served the nuns and in which both (and the Order as a whole) were under the authority of the Abbess of Fontevraud - this made it the only order to be governed in that way. Members used the initials O.R.F. after their names, which stood for Ordre Royal de Fontevraud (Royal Order of Fontevraud). Many documents on the Order survive in the Bibliotheque Nationale de France.

=== Founders ===
==== Robert of Arbrissel ====
Robert founded the Order in 1101 (Note: A seminar was organised at Fontevraud on 25–26 September 2015 on the 900th anniversary of Robert's death) The abbey at Fontevraud was the mother house.

==== Hersende of Champagne ====
Born in 1060 and dying on 1 December 1114, Hersende of Champagne may be considered the Order's cofounder, since she ensured Robert's teachings continued. Recent research has shown her to be the mother of Heloise, Abelard's wife and lover.

=== The Fontevraud Gradual - an example of Fontevrist liturgy ===
Eleanor of Britanny's gradual, also known as the Fontevraud Gradual, is now in the Bibliothèque francophone multimédia de Limoges. A codex with 105 small folios, it combines the temporal and sanctoral are intertwined. The liturgical year within the book starts with the first Sunday of Advent and ends with 30 November (the feast of saint Andrew). (Note: (in French) Dominique Habeillon (December 2016). "Le Graduel de Fontevraud comme medium d'un répertoire liturgique chanté". Bulletin de l'APF (Association des prieurés fontevristes). p. 51 à 66.) ·

=== The Bourbon-Lavedan seminary (or Little Fontevraud) ===
As of 1614 novice nuns for the Order were educated in philosophy and theology by an English Benedictine monk and Jesuit fathers in la Flèche. That arrangement was made permanent in 1619, when Louise de Bourbon Lavedan (thirtieth abbess of Fontevraud) founded a seminary in that town where abbey monks could be taught by Jesuits. A letter from pope Paul V dated 2 December 1621 confirmed that foundation.

The new foundation's first head was brother Montéage, with twelve students. However, just over thirty years later abbess Jeanne-Baptiste de Bourbon tried to reform teaching completely by adding a nuns' convent to this male monastery, along the original lines of Fontevrist daughter houses. This gave rise to what the archivist Jean Lardier called "Little Fontevraud", though that name was also given to a Fontevrist priory in London.

The school was expanded in 1631 by rebuilding the east wing but in 1642 it switched from Jesuits teaching monastics to Fontevrist nuns educating young girls. It was confiscated and turned into state property in 1793 before being sold to a private owner as a house. It was finally destroyed in 1880, with almost none of the building surviving and a school built on the site. Only the 'rue Fontevrault', winding around the heart of the old town between Grande Rue and the Loire, gives any clue to the Order's previous presence in the town.

=== Dom Jean Lardier, the Order's first archivist ===
In 1637 the thirty-first abbess, Jeanne-Baptiste de Bourbon, began campaigning for Robert's canonisation. To head the campaign she picked Dom Jean Lardier, a former prior of the male monastery of Saint-Jean de l'Habit, located in Fontevraud. He had been born in Châteaugontier (53200) on November (or December) 25, 1601 and after his novitiate took his final vows as a monk of the Fontevraud Order on August 17, 1622. During the last thirty years of his life he would write seventy-two volumes providing a complete picture of the Order. "The Treasury was then intact in the rooms reserved for the archives, at the corner of the abbess's residence, near the Saint Benedict chapel".

The seven-volume manuscript Inventory of Titles or Thrésor de l'Ordre de Fontevraud still survives in the Archives départementales du Maine-et-Loire. It was produced by Lardier between 1646 and 1658 and classes and catalogues the charters relating to the abbey. In 1699 Gaignières made several extracts from and copies of the titles from the work, placing them in two folio volumes now in the Bibliothèque impériale.

Another of Lardier's works, La Sainte Famille de Fontevrault, gives a genealogy of famous nuns, founders and benefactors to the Order, whose names are isncribed in the 1650 Font-Evrault martyrology. Only its third volume now survives, as ms. 12 in the bibliothèque de Château-Gontier (53200) - that has also been microfilmed by the Archives départementales du Maine-et-Loire.

== The Rule ==
Robert preferentially issued "brief and imperative prescriptions" (Note: (in French) Antoine Font (February 2014). "Le contexte historique de la Règle de l'ordre et de la Réformation - premiere partie". Bulletin de l'APF. pp. 5–40.) and then the abbesses who followed to put two rules into practice - the Benedictine for the nuns and the Augustinian for the monk-priests. The work by the order's four reforming abbesses (Marie de Bretagne, Renée de Bourbon, Louise de Bourbon, Éléonore de Bourbon), initially adopted in 1474, was printed in 1642. (Note: (in French) Antoine Font (December 2014). "Le contexte historique de la Règle de l'ordre et de la Réformation - deuxieme partie. Le retour aux sources". Bulletin de l'APF. p. 5 à 45..)

The abbess alone would not have been unable to reform the Order alone, nor could the pope (on whom the Order depended) at such a great distance. The success of the reforms is therefore down to a combination of the pope, the abbess and the delegated or sub-delegated commissioners sent by the pope. Jean de Viguerie argues that without these reforms the crisis due to the French Wars of Religion would have seriously disturbed the running of the Order.

== Its approach to spirituality ==
=== The Good Friday miracle ===
A piece of wood was revealed to be part of the True Cross on Good Friday (27 March) 1304, the nun Marguerite de Chamblais having declared that she had received such a part from her mother. To authenticate it, it was decided to place it in a vase full of holy water in the choir of the abbey church. The water took on the colour and consistency of blood and so the abbess Marguerite de Pocé summoned Jean dit Poter, de Thouars, a notary and clerk from the diocese of Poitiers, who recorded statements from twenty witnesses, all of which agreed. From then on this was known as the "miracle of the effusion of the Holy Blood" in Fontevrist liturgy, celebrated by the Order right up until the Revolution - it is marked for instance by a 'parchment placard' now in the archives départementales du Maine–et-Loire.

== Disappearance ==
It and all other regular orders were abolished by decree of the National Assembly on 13 February 1790. The mother house was sacked in 30 January 1793 then turned into a prison, the latter ironically thus guaranteeing its survival. The seemingly less profitable dependencies and priories were instead sold off to private individuals and so part of their buildings are now usually lost. Three of the Order's nuns died in the Reign of Terror:

- Marie-Eléonore Ouvrard-Martigny de Nazelles, condemned to death on 22 December 1793 by the military commission in Saumur and guillotined on 22 December 1793;
- Jeanne Vanime, condemned to death as a counter-revolutionary on 10 January 1794 by the military commission in Port-Malo (35400 Saint-Malo).
- Marcelle Aimée de James (prioress of Lencloître), condemned to death as a conspirator and fanatic by the Revolutionary Tribunal in Paris on 18 March 1794 and guillotined the same day. (Note: (in French) "Marcelle-Aimée de James - Ascendance, Histoire et armoiries d'une martyre fontevristre". Dictionnaire de l'ordre monastique de Fontevraud. 7 June 2014..)

== Temporary revival ==
Its disappearance was not initially permanent, as women-only revivals of it occurred in Boulaur, Brioude, Chemillé and also briefly in Spain. The revived religious community at Boulaur Abbey was chosen as the site for the official revival of the Order, which occurred by a royal decree dated 13 May 1847. The Mother Superiors of three Fontevrist priories (Marie Giraud for Chemillé, Marie Carcanaygue for Boulaur, Virginie Faure for Brioude) on 5 September 1849 merged at Boulars to unify their observance of the Rule.

The final end for the Order came on 4 March 1956, when the Fontevrists of Chemillé merged into the missionary congregation of Vanves before moving to Martigné-Briand in 1959, where they opened a guesthouse. On 18 September 1963 the remains of the nuns and their chaplains were moved from Chemillé to Martigné-Briand, where they still remain, marking the very final event in the Order's history. (Note: (in French) Alain Texier (December 2016). "Un après- midi sur les traces des dernières fontevristes: Martigné-Briand. Vendredi 3 juin 2016". Bulletin de l'APF (Association des Prieurés Fontevristes). pp. 6–13..)
